= Sun Belt Conference softball tournament =

- Conference softball championship
- Official Logo of the Sun Belt Conference
- Sport: Softball
- Conference: Sun Belt Conference
- Number of teams: 8
- Format: Single-elimination tournament
- Current stadium: Troy Softball Complex
- Current location: Troy, Alabama
- Played: 2000-present
- Last contest: 2026
- Current champion: South Alabama
- Most championships: Louisiana/Louisiana–Lafayette (18)

Host stadiums
- Yvette Girouard Field at Lamson Park (2000, 2004, 2011, 2014, 2018, 2023, 2026); Bobcat Softball Stadium (2015, 2016, 2019); Troy Softball Complex (2008, 2013, 2017, 2021); FIU Softball Stadium (2002, 2006); WKU Softball Complex (2003, 2005); FAU Softball Complex (2012); Jaguar Field (2010, 2022); Lovelace Softball Stadium (2009); MT Softball Complex (2007); NM State Softball Complex (2001)

Host locations
- Lafayette, LA; San Marcos, TX; Troy, AL; Miami, FL; Bowling Green, KY; Boca Raton, FL; Mobile, AL; Denton, TX; Murfreesboro, TN; Las Cruces, NM

The Sun Belt Conference softball tournament is the conference championship tournament in softball for the Sun Belt Conference. The winner of the tournament receives the conference's automatic bid to the NCAA Division I softball tournament. The 2026 host of the tournament is the University of Louisiana at Lafayette at Yvette Girouard Field at Lamson Park, the largest softball facility in the conference.

== Tournament ==
The Sun Belt Conference softball tournament is an eight team double-elimination tournament held annually at various sites in the Sun Belt Conference region. The bottom four seeds play a one-round single elimination play in game. The four teams with the best conference record at the end of the regular season earn automatic berths in the tournament. After the play-in round, the remaining six teams will play 2 four team double-elimination brackets with a single elimination championship game between the bracket winners. The team with the best conference record will be seeded #1 and will play one of the winners of the first-round game. The team with the second-best conference record will receive the #2 seed and will also play one of the winners of the first-round game. The champion of the competition receives an automatic bid to the NCAA Division I softball tournament.

== History ==
The tournament started in 2000 as a four team double-elimination tournament.

In 2001, the tournament expanded to include six teams but still remained double-elimination.

For the 2002 and 2003 edition, the tournament included five teams and remained double-elimination.

From 2004, the tournament went back to a six-team double-elimination format and stayed that way until 2007 when it expanded to eight-teams double-elimination and has stayed that way since.

The Ragin' Cajuns of Louisiana have considerably successful in the tournament, winning all but five times in the entirety of the tournament. Most winners of the tournament finished the season in the national Top-25 polls or received votes, except the 2007 Florida Atlantic team and the 2012 South Alabama team. The highest ranked of those teams was the 2008 Louisiana–Lafayette team to finish No. 6 in the NFCA poll. The lowest of those ranked teams was the 2002 Louisiana–Lafayette team who finished receiving votes.

== Champions ==
=== By Year ===
Year	School	Site	Most Outstanding Player(s)
2000	Louisiana–Lafayette	Lafayette, LA	Kim Dunlap, Louisiana–Lafayette
2001	Louisiana–Lafayette	Las Cruces, NM	Missy Martin, Louisiana–Lafayette
2002	Louisiana–Lafayette	Miami, FL	Melissa Coronado, Louisiana–Lafayette
2003	Louisiana–Lafayette	Bowling Green, KY	Brooke Mitchell, Louisiana–Lafayette
2004	Louisiana–Lafayette	Lafayette, LA	Brooke Mitchell, Louisiana–Lafayette
2005	Louisiana–Lafayette	Bowling Green, KY	Heather Bobbitt, Louisiana–Lafayette
2006	Louisiana–Lafayette	Miami, FL	Jessica Lemoine, Louisiana–Lafayette
2007	Florida Atlantic	Murfreesboro, TN	Jen Musillo, Florida Atlantic
2008	Louisiana–Lafayette	Troy, AL	Ashley Brignac, Louisiana–Lafayette
2009	Louisiana–Lafayette	Denton, TX	Christi Orgeron, Louisiana–Lafayette
2010	Louisiana–Lafayette	Mobile, AL	Donna Bourgeois & Gabrielle Bridges, Louisiana–Lafayette
2011	Louisiana–Lafayette	Lafayette, LA	Christi Orgeron, Louisiana–Lafayette
2012	South Alabama	Boca Raton, FL	Hannah Campbell, South Alabama
2013	South Alabama	Troy, AL	Hannah Campbell, South Alabama
2014	Louisiana–Lafayette	Lafayette, LA	Lexie Elkins, Louisiana–Lafayette
2015	South Alabama	San Marcos, TX	Kaitlyn Griffith, South Alabama
2016	Louisiana–Lafayette	San Marcos, TX	Aleah Craighton, Louisiana–Lafayette
2017	Louisiana–Lafayette	Troy, AL	Alex Stewart, Louisiana–Lafayette
2018	Texas State	Lafayette, LA	Haleigh Davis, Texas State
2019	Louisiana	San Marcos, TX	Summer Ellyson, Louisiana
2020	Cancelled due to the coronavirus pandemic		
2021	Louisiana	Troy, AL	Summer Ellyson, Louisiana
2022	Louisiana	Mobile, AL	Raina O'Neal, Louisiana
2023	Louisiana	Lafayette, LA	Sam Landry, Louisiana
2024	Texas State	San Marcos, TX	Sara Vanderford, Texas State
2025	Coastal Carolina	Troy, AL	Nicolette Picone, Coastal Carolina
2026	South Alabama	Lafayette, LA	Ryley Harrison, South Alabama

=== By school ===
As of July 1, 2022, there are 12 schools in the conference that competes in softball, however, only three of the twelve schools have softball championships.

==== Current members ====
School	Tourney Titles	Title Years
Louisiana/Louisiana–Lafayette	18	2000, 2001, 2002, 2003, 2004, 2005, 2006, 2008, 2009, 2010, 2011, 2014, 2016, 2017, 2019, 2021, 2022, 2023
South Alabama	4	2012, 2013, 2015, 2026
Coastal Carolina	1	2025

==== Former members ====
School	Tourney Titles	Title Years
Texas State	2	2018, 2024
Florida Atlantic	1	2007
