= List of Sun Belt Conference champions =

The Sun Belt Conference sponsors nine men's sports and 10 women's sports. This is a list of conference champions for each sport.

== Members ==
All dates of membership reflect the calendar years of entry and departure. Since all past Sun Belt associate members participated only in fall sports, the year of departure is the calendar year after the final (planned) season of competition.

=== Full members ===
- Appalachian State
- Arkansas State
- Coastal Carolina
- Georgia Southern
- Georgia State
- James Madison
- Louisiana
- Louisiana–Monroe
- Marshall
- Old Dominion
- South Alabama
- Southern Miss
- Texas State
- Troy

=== Affiliate members ===
- Charleston – beach volleyball
- Kentucky – men's soccer
- Mercer – beach volleyball
- South Carolina – men's soccer
- UCF – men's soccer
- UNCW – beach volleyball
- West Virginia – men's soccer

=== Former full members ===
- UAB, 1976–1991
- Central Florida, 1991–1992
- Denver, 1999–2012
- FIU, 1998–2013
- Florida Atlantic, 2005–2013
- Jacksonville, 1978–1998
- Lamar, 1991–1998
- Little Rock, 1991–2022
- Louisiana Tech, 1991–2001
- Middle Tennessee, 2000–2013
- New Mexico State, 2000–2005
- UNO, 1976–1980; 1991–2010
- UNC-Charlotte, 1976–1991
- North Texas, 2000–2013
- South Florida, 1976–1991
- UT Arlington, 2013–2022
- UT Pan American, 1991–1998
- VCU, 1979–1991
- Western Kentucky, 1982–2014

=== Former affiliate members ===
- Central Arkansas – men's soccer, 2019–2021
- Hartwick – men's soccer, 2014–2018
- Howard – men's soccer, 2014–2020
- Idaho – football, 2001–2005, 2014–2018
- New Mexico State – football, 2014–2018
- NJIT – men's soccer, 2014–2016
- Stephen F. Austin – beach volleyball, 2022–2024
- Utah State – football, 2003–2005

== Vic Bubas Cup ==
The Vic Bubas Cup (formerly the Sun Belt Cup) is the Sun Belt's all-sports championship trophy, named after the Sun Belt's first commissioner Vic Bubas. The reigning champion is South Alabama, who won their record 17th Bubas Cup in the 2025–26 season.

=== Scoring ===
As of 2026–27, the scoring system is as follows:

- For sports with regular season conference competition (baseball, basketball, football, soccer, softball, and volleyball), cup points are awarded based on each teams' regular season finish.
  - Standings are determined by winning percentage in conference games for all sports besides men's and women's soccer, in which standings are determined by points, with three points given for a win, one point for a draw, and no points for a loss.
- For sports without regular season competition (cross country, golf, track and field, and tennis), points are awarded based on Sun Belt Tournament finish.
- The number of points for each sport is based on the number of schools in the conference which sponsor that sport. For example, the men's basketball regular season champion receives 14 points but the men's cross country champion only receives 9.
  - While affiliate members are ineligible for the award and cannot receive points, sports with affiliate members count the affiliate members in the formula for awarding points. For example, as of 2026, the men's soccer regular season champion receives 10 points, as long as they are a full member of the conference, because men's soccer is sponsored by six full members and four affiliate members.
- If two or more teams are tied for the same position in a sport's standings, they split the points for that position. For example, if two teams are tied for first in a sport that awards 14 points, each receives 13.5 points.
- For sports with both a regular season conference competition and a conference tournament, the conference tournament winner receives one additional point.
- For sports with divisions (baseball, basketball, football, and volleyball), points are awarded based on overall conference record regardless of divisional finish.
- If necessary, the tiebreaker is the number of conference titles each school won that season. If this is also tied then the teams involved are declared co-champions.

=== History ===
The early years of the competition were largely dominated by the South Florida Bulls, who won 8 of the first 10 Vic Bubas Cups. After South Florida left the conference following their 9th Cup win after the 1990 season, South Alabama took over as the dominant force in the conference, winning 8 of the next 10 competitions. Between 2001 and 2014, the only teams to win the Cup were Middle Tennessee (with 9) and Western Kentucky (with 5). Middle Tennessee left the conference after 2013 and Western Kentucky did the same the following year, which paved the way for South Alabama to retake control of the Cup for each of the next four seasons. After that, South Alabama and Texas State combined to win seven of the next eight Cups, South Alabama winning three and Texas State winning four, (Note: Texas State was deemed ineligible for the 2025–26 Vic Bubas Cup after they announced their intention to leave the conference effective July 1, 2026 prior to the start of the 2025–26 season. Based on the season's standings, if eligible, Texas State would have finished the competition with 146 points to South Alabama's 130.5. South Alabama is recognized by the Sun Belt Conference as the official 2025–26 Vic Bubas Cup winner.) with Texas State leaving the conference for the Pac-12 following the 2025–26 season.

=== Trophy ===
The trophy itself has gone through four different designs. The first was a blue and white porcelain vase and all others have been a Waterford Crystal vase (each version becoming more elaborate than the version prior). The current design was introduced during the 2022–23 season.

=== Winners ===
Year	Winner
1976–77	Jacksonville*
1977–78	South Florida*
1978–79	South Florida*
1979–80	South Florida*
1980–81	South Florida*
1981–82	South Florida*
1982–83	Old Dominion
1983–84	South Florida*
1984–85	South Florida*
1985–86	South Florida*
1986–87	Western Kentucky*
1987–88	South Alabama
1988–89	South Alabama
1989–90	South Florida*
1990–91	South Alabama
1991–92	South Alabama
1992–93	South Alabama
1993–94	South Alabama
1994–95	Arkansas State
1995–96	South Alabama
1996–97	South Alabama
1997–98	Arkansas State
1998–99	South Alabama
1999–2000	South Alabama
2000–01	Middle Tennessee*
2001–02	Western Kentucky*
2002–03	Western Kentucky*
2003–04	Middle Tennessee*
2004–05	Middle Tennessee*
2005–06	Western Kentucky*
2006–07	Middle Tennessee*
2007–08	Western Kentucky*
2008–09	Middle Tennessee*
2009–10	Middle Tennessee*
2010–11	Middle Tennessee*
2011–12	Middle Tennessee*
2012–13	Middle Tennessee*
2013–14	Western Kentucky*
2014–15	South Alabama
2015–16	South Alabama
2016–17	South Alabama
2017–18	South Alabama
2018–19	Texas State*
2019–20	Arkansas State
2020–21	South Alabama
2021–22	Texas State*
2022–23	South Alabama
2023–24	Texas State*
2024–25	Texas State*
2025–26	South Alabama

Team	Number of Bubas Cups
South Alabama	17
South Florida*	9
Middle Tennessee*	9
Western Kentucky*	6
Texas State*	4
Arkansas State	3
Jacksonville*	1
Old Dominion	1

*– No longer members of the Sun Belt Conference. Old Dominion left the SBC in 1991 and returned in 2022.

== Current champions ==
Sport	Regular Season Champion (Note: For football, this is the winner of the championship game.)	Postseason Champion
Baseball	Southern Miss (2026)	Southern Miss (2026)
Football	James Madison (2025)	James Madison (2025)
Men's Basketball	Troy (2025–26)	Troy (2025–26)
Men's Cross Country	–	Appalachian State (2026)
Men's Golf	–	Arkansas State (2026)
Men's Soccer	Kentucky (2025)	UCF (2025)
Men's Indoor Track and Field	–	Texas State (2025–26)
Men's Outdoor Track and Field	–	Texas State (2026)
Men's Tennis	–	Old Dominion (2026)
Women's Basketball	Georgia Southern (2025–26)	James Madison (2025–26)
Beach Volleyball	–	Georgia State (2026)
Women's Cross Country	–	Appalachian State (2025)
Women's Golf	–	ULM (2026)
Women's Soccer	ULM (2025)	Texas State (2025)
Softball	ULM (2026)	South Alabama (2026)
Women's Tennis	–	Old Dominion (2026)
Women's Indoor Track and Field	–	Texas State (2025–26)
Women's Outdoor Track and Field	–	Texas State (2026)
Volleyball	James Madison (2025)	Arkansas State (2025)

== Baseball ==
The Sun Belt Conference has sponsored an annual baseball tournament to determine the conference winner and automatic NCAA Division I Tournament host since 1978. South Alabama has won the most championships, at 13. The Sun Belt also has imposed several seasons under divisional structure (1981-1994; 2016-2021). In 2022, the structure reverted back to standard structure (1978-1980; 1995-2015; 2022-present).

Season	Tournament Champion	Regular Season Champion
1978	New Orleans	South Alabama
1979	New Orleans	
1980	South Alabama	
1981	South Alabama (T & South Division)	Alabama–Birmingham (North Division)
1982	South Florida (T & South Division)	Alabama–Birmingham (North Division)
1983	South Alabama (T & West Division)	Old Dominion (East Division
1984	South Alabama (T & West Division)	UNC Charlotte (East Division)
1985	Old Dominion (T & East Division)	Western Kentucky (West Division)
1986	South Florida (T & West Division)	Jacksonville (East Division)
1987	South Alabama (T & West Division)	Old Dominion (East Division)
1988	Virginia Commonwealth (T & East Division)	Western Kentucky (West Division)
1989	Jacksonville (T & East Division)	South Florida (West Division)
1990	South Florida	Jacksonville (East Division); South Alabama (West Division)
1991	Alabama–Birmingham	Jacksonville (East Division); South Alabama (West Division)
1992	South Alabama (T & East Division)	Louisiana Tech (West Division)
1993	Lamar (T & West Division)	South Alabama (East Division)
1994	Arkansas State	South Alabama (East Division); Lamar (West Division)
1995	Lamar	Jacksonville
1996	South Alabama	
1997	South Alabama	Southwestern Louisiana
1998	Southwestern Louisiana	South Alabama
1999	Florida International	South Alabama
2000	South Alabama	New Orleans
2001	South Alabama (T & Co-RS)	Middle Tennessee (Co-RS)
2002	New Mexico State	South Alabama
2003	Middle Tennessee	South Alabama
2004	Western Kentucky	Middle Tennessee
2005	South Alabama	Louisiana–Lafayette
2006	Troy	
2007	New Orleans	Louisiana–Lafayette
2008	Western Kentucky	Louisiana–Monroe
2009	Middle Tennessee State	
2010	Florida International	Louisiana–Lafayette; Florida Atlantic
2011	Arkansas–Little Rock	Troy
2012	Louisiana–Monroe	Florida Atlantic
2013	Florida Atlantic	Troy; South Alabama
2014	Louisiana–Lafayette	
2015	Louisiana–Lafayette	South Alabama
2016	Louisiana–Lafayette (T & Co-RS)	South Alabama (Co-RS)
2017	South Alabama	Coastal Carolina (East Division); UT Arlington (West Division)
2018	Coastal Carolina (T & East Division)	Louisiana (West Division)
2019	Coastal Carolina	Georgia Southern (East Division); Texas State (West Division)
2020	None	
2021	South Alabama (T & East Division)	Louisiana (West Division)
2022	Louisiana	Texas State
2023	Southern Miss	Coastal Carolina
2024	Southern Miss	Louisiana
2025	Coastal Carolina	Coastal Carolina
2026	Southern Miss	Southern Miss

== Softball ==
The Sun Belt Conference has sponsored an annual softball tournament to determine the conference winner and automatic bid to the NCAA Division I softball tournament since 2000. Louisiana has won the most championships, at 18.

Season	Tournament Champion	Regular Season Champion
2000	Louisiana–Lafayette	
2001	Louisiana–Lafayette	
2002	Louisiana–Lafayette	
2003	Louisiana–Lafayette	
2004	Louisiana–Lafayette	
2005	Louisiana–Lafayette	
2006	Louisiana–Lafayette	
2007	Florida Atlantic	
2008	Louisiana–Lafayette	
2009	Louisiana–Lafayette	
2010	Louisiana–Lafayette	
2011	Louisiana–Lafayette	
2012	South Alabama	Louisiana–Lafayette
2013	South Alabama	Western Kentucky
2014	Louisiana–Lafayette	
2015	South Alabama	Louisiana–Lafayette
2016	Louisiana–Lafayette	
2017	Louisiana–Lafayette	
2018	Texas State	
2019	Louisiana	
2020	None	
2021	Louisiana	
2022	Louisiana	
2023	Louisiana	
2024	Texas State	Louisiana
2025	Coastal Carolina	Texas State
2026	South Alabama	Louisiana–Monroe

== Basketball ==
Since 2020–21, the Sun Belt Conference men's and women's basketball tournaments, held in early March, has involved all conference members and is played entirely in Pensacola, Florida. First- and second-round games are played at Hartsell Arena on the campus of Pensacola State College and the Pensacola Bay Center, with semifinals and finals at the Bay Center. Winners of the tournaments earn automatic bids to their respective NCAA Division I Basketball Tournament.

Season	Men's Regular Season Champion	Men's Tournament Champion	Women's Regular Season Champion	Women's Tournament Champion
1977	North Carolina–Charlotte		No Regular Season	No Tournament
1978	North Carolina–Charlotte	New Orleans	No Regular Season	No Tournament
1979	South Alabama	Jacksonville	No Regular Season	No Tournament
1980	South Alabama	Virginia Commonwealth	No Regular Season	No Tournament
1981	Alabama-Birmingham; South Alabama; Virginia Commonwealth	Virginia Commonwealth	No Regular Season	No Tournament
1982	Alabama–Birmingham		No Regular Season	No Tournament
1983	Old Dominion; Virginia Commonwealth	Alabama–Birmingham	Old Dominion	
1984	Virginia Commonwealth	Alabama–Birmingham	Old Dominion	
1985	Virginia Commonwealth		Old Dominion	
1986	Old Dominion	Jacksonville	Western Kentucky	
1987	Western Kentucky	Alabama–Birmingham	Old Dominion	
1988	North Carolina–Charlotte		Old Dominion	Western Kentucky
1989	South Alabama		Old Dominion	Western Kentucky
1990	Alabama–Birmingham	South Florida	Alabama–Birmingham	Old Dominion
1991	South Alabama		Alabama–Birmingham	Western Kentucky
1992	Louisiana Tech; Southwestern Louisiana	Southwestern Louisiana	Western Kentucky	
1993	New Orleans	Western Kentucky	Western Kentucky	
1994	Western Kentucky	Southwestern Louisiana	Louisiana Tech	
1995	Western Kentucky		Louisiana Tech	Western Kentucky
1996	Arkansas–Little Rock; New Orleans	New Orleans	Louisiana Tech	
1997	New Orleans; South Alabama	South Alabama	Louisiana Tech	
1998	Arkansas State; South Alabama	South Alabama	Louisiana Tech	
1999	Louisiana Tech	Arkansas State	Louisiana Tech	
2000	Louisiana–Lafayette; South Alabama	Louisiana-Lafayette	Louisiana Tech	
2001	Western Kentucky		Louisiana Tech	
2002	Western Kentucky		Florida International	
2003	Western Kentucky		Western Kentucky	
2004	Louisiana–Lafayette (vacated)		South Alabama	Middle Tennessee State
2005	Denver	Louisiana–Lafayette (vacated)	Western Kentucky	Middle Tennessee State
2006	Western Kentucky	South Alabama	Western Kentucky	Middle Tennessee
2007	South Alabama	North Texas	Middle Tennessee	
2008	South Alabama; Western Kentucky	Western Kentucky	Western Kentucky	
2009	Arkansas–Little Rock; Western Kentucky	Western Kentucky	Middle Tennessee	
2010	Middle Tennessee; North Texas; Troy	North Texas	Arkansas–Little Rock	Middle Tennessee
2011	Florida Atlantic	Arkansas–Little Rock	Middle Tennessee; Arkansas–Little Rock	Arkansas–Little Rock
2012	Middle Tennessee	Western Kentucky	Middle Tennessee	Arkansas–Little Rock
2013	Middle Tennessee	Western Kentucky	Middle Tennessee	Arkansas–Little Rock
2014	Georgia State	Louisiana–Lafayette	Arkansas State	Western Kentucky
2015	Georgia State		Arkansas–Little Rock	
2016	Little Rock		Arkansas State	Troy
2017	UT Arlington	Troy	Little Rock	Troy
2018	Louisiana	Georgia State	Little Rock	
2019	Georgia State		Little Rock; UT Arlington	Little Rock
2020	Little Rock	Tournament canceled	Troy	Tournament canceled
2021	Texas State	Appalachian State	Louisiana	Troy
2022	Texas State	Georgia State	Troy	UT Arlington
2023	Southern Miss	Louisiana	James Madison; Southern Miss; Texas State	James Madison
2024	Appalachian State	James Madison	Marshall	
2025	Arkansas State; James Madison; South Alabama; Troy	Troy	James Madison	Arkansas State
2026	Troy	Troy	Georgia Southern	James Madison

== Football ==
All 14 full Sun Belt members play football in the conference. Idaho and New Mexico State competed as single-sport members before being dropped from Sun Belt football after the 2017 season.

=== Champions ===
Football Summary
Current Members
School	Last Sun Belt Title	Number of Sun Belt Titles
Troy	2023	8
Arkansas State	2016	6
Appalachian State	2019	4
Louisiana	2021	3 (Note: Does not include one title in 2013 vacated due to NCAA sanctions.)
Coastal Carolina	2020	1
Georgia Southern	2014	1
James Madison	2025	1
Marshall	2024	1
ULM	2005	1
Georgia State	Never	0
Old Dominion	Never	0
South Alabama	Never	0
Southern Miss	Never	0
Texas State	Never	0
Former Members
North Texas	2004	4
Middle Tennessee	2006	2
Florida Atlantic	2007	1
FIU	2010	1
Idaho	Never	0
New Mexico State	Never	0
Utah State	Never	0
Western Kentucky	Never	0

Year	Champion(s)
2001	North Texas, Middle Tennessee
2002	North Texas
2003	North Texas
2004	North Texas
2005	Arkansas State, UL Monroe, UL Lafayette
2006	Troy, Middle Tennessee
2007	FAU, Troy
2008	Troy
2009	Troy
2010	Troy, FIU
2011	Arkansas State
2012	Arkansas State
2013	Arkansas State, UL Lafayette (Note: Louisiana's title was vacated due to NCAA sanctions.)
2014	Georgia Southern
2015	Arkansas State
2016	Appalachian State, Arkansas State
2017	Appalachian State, Troy
2018	Appalachian State
2019	Appalachian State
2020	Coastal Carolina & Louisiana (Note: Divisional champions Coastal Carolina and Louisiana were declared conference co-champions after the scheduled Sun Belt championship game was canceled due to COVID-19.)
2021	Louisiana
2022	Troy
2023	Troy
2024	Marshall
2025	James Madison

== Golf ==
=== Champions ===
Year	Men's Champion	Women's Champion
1977	Jacksonville	
1978	Jacksonville	
1979	South Florida	
1980	South Florida	
1981	South Florida	
1982	South Florida	
1983	South Florida	
1984	South Florida	
1985	South Florida	
1986	South Florida	
1987	South Florida	
1988	South Florida	
1989	South Florida	
1990	Virginia Commonwealth	South Florida
1991	South Alabama	
1992	South Alabama	UCF
1993	Louisiana-Lafayette	Lamar
1994	South Alabama	Lamar
1995	South Alabama	Lamar
1996	South Alabama	Lamar
1997	Louisiana-Lafayette	South Alabama
1998	South Alabama	UALR
1999	South Alabama	UALR
2000	UALR	Arkansas State
2001	UALR	New Mexico State
2002	South Alabama	New Mexico State
2003	North Texas	New Mexico State
2004	New Mexico State	Denver
2005	South Alabama	Denver
2006	Western Kentucky	Denver
2007	Louisiana-Lafayette	Denver
2008	Denver	Denver
2009	Middle Tennessee	Denver
2010	South Alabama	Denver
2011	Denver	Denver
2012	North Texas	Denver
2013	North Texas	FIU
2014	Georgia State	Troy
2015	Georgia Southern	Troy
2016	Troy	Texas State
2017	Georgia State	Troy
2018	Coastal Carolina	Coastal Carolina
2019	Arkansas State	South Alabama
2021	Georgia Southern	Coastal Carolina
2022	Little Rock	Georgia Southern
2023	Louisiana	ULM
2024	Arkansas State	Texas State
2025	Coastal Carolina	Southern Miss
2026	Arkansas State	ULM
