= 2020 Louisiana Ragin' Cajuns softball team =

American college softball season

2020 Louisiana Ragin' Cajuns softball

NCAA RPI National Champions
- Conference: Sun Belt Conference

Ranking
- Coaches: No. 8
- Record: 18–6 (2–1 SBC)
- Head coach: Gerry Glasco (3rd season)
- Assistant coaches: Mike Roberts; Lacy Prejean
- Home stadium: Yvette Girouard Field at Lamson Park

2020 Sun Belt Conference softball standings
	Conf.				Overall
Team	W		L	PCT	W		L	PCT
No. 8 Louisiana ‍‍‍	2	–	1	.667	18	–	6	.750
Texas State ‍‍‍	2	–	1	.667	15	–	9	.625
Georgia Southern ‍‍‍	2	–	1	.667	14	–	10	.583
UT Arlington ‍‍‍	2	–	1	.667	12	–	13	.480
South Alabama ‍‍‍	2	–	1	.667	8	–	17	.320
Troy ‍‍‍	1	–	2	.333	16	–	6	.727
Coastal Carolina ‍‍‍	1	–	2	.333	13	–	8	.619
Appalachian State ‍‍‍	1	–	2	.333	13	–	9	.591
Louisiana–Monroe ‍‍‍	1	–	2	.333	10	–	14	.417
Georgia State ‍‍‍	1	–	2	.333	7	–	16	.304
† – Conference champion ‡ – Tournament champion y – Invited to the NCAA tournament As of March 13, 2020; Rankings from NFCA

The 2020 Louisiana Ragin' Cajuns softball team represented the University of Louisiana at Lafayette in the 2020 NCAA Division I softball season. The Ragin' Cajuns played their home games at Yvette Girouard Field at Lamson Park. The Cajuns were led by third year head coach Gerry Glasco.

On March 12, the Sun Belt Conference announced the indefinite suspension of all spring athletics, including softball, due to the increasing risk of the COVID-19 pandemic. On March 13, Louisiana governor John Bel Edwards signed an executive order banning gatherings of over 250 people until as early as April 18, thus ending all possible future 2020 home or in-state games until that time if the season were to restart. On March 16, the Sun Belt formally announced the cancelation of all spring sports, thus ending their season definitely.

The Cajuns finished the abbreviated season 1st in the only-released RPI in the NCAA, thus making them the claimed "RPI National Champions".

== Preseason ==
=== Sun Belt Conference Coaches Poll ===
The Sun Belt Conference Coaches Poll was released on January 29, 2020. Louisiana was picked to finish first in the Sun Belt Conference with 100 votes and 10 first place votes, all first place votes available.

Coaches poll
Predicted finish	Team	Votes (1st place)
1	Louisiana	100 (10)
2	Troy	85
3	UT Arlington	77
4	Texas State	74
5	Coastal Carolina	56
6	Appalachian State	47
7	Georgia Southern	36
8	South Alabama	31
9	Louisiana-Monroe	26
10	Georgia State	18

=== Preseason All-Sun Belt team ===
- Summer Ellyson (LA, SR, Pitcher)
- Megan Kleist (LA, SR, Pitcher)
- Julie Rawls (LA, SR, Catcher)
- Reagan Wright (UTA, SR, Catcher)
- Katie Webb (TROY, SR, 1st Base)
- Kaitlyn Alderink (LA, SR, 2nd Base)
- Hailey Mackay (TXST, SR, 3rd Base)
- Alissa Dalton (LA, SR, Shortstop)
- Jayden Mount (ULM, SR, Shortstop)
- Whitney Walton (UTA, SR, Shortstop)
- Tara Oltmann (TXST, JR, Shortstop)
- Courtney Dean (CCU, JR, Outfield)
- Mekhia Freeman (GASO, SR, Outfield)
- Sarah Hudek (LA, SR, Outfield)
- Raina O'Neal (LA, JR, Outfield)
- Bailey Curry (LA, JR, Designated Player/1st Base)

Sun Belt Conference Preseason Player of the Year

- Alissa Dalton (LA, SR, Shortstop)

Sun Belt Conference Preseason Pitcher of the Year

- Summer Ellyson (LA, SR, Pitcher)

=== National Softball Signing Day ===
Player	Position	Hometown	Previous Team
Mia Cantu	Infielder	Spring, Texas	Klein Collins HS
Delaney Enlow	Infielder	Versailles, Kentucky	Woodford County HS
Addie Lightner	Infielder	Blue Springs, Missouri	Blue Springs South HS
Hannah Nalley	Outfielder	Marion, Illinois	Marion HS
Sophie Piskos	Catcher	Paris, Tennessee	The Baylor School
Kyleigh Sand	Shortstop	Chino, California	Norco HS
Taylor Snow	Pitcher	Columbia, Louisiana	LaSalle HS

== Roster ==
2020 Louisiana Ragin' Cajuns roster
Pitchers: 5 Madison Garay - Freshman; 9 Summer Ellyson - Senior; 11 Megan Kleist - Senior; 18 Casey Dixon - Junior; 28 Carrie Boswell - Junior; 53 Kandra Lamb - Sophomore; Taylor Snow - Freshman; Outfielders: 2 Raina O'Neal - Junior; 6 Morgan Gray - Senior; 16 Kendall Talley - Sophomore; 19 Brittni Rufus - Freshman; 24 Callie Martin - Junior; 31 Taylor Fawcett - Freshman; 35 Sarah Hudek - Senior; 42 Kylie Neel - Freshman; Hannah Nalley - Freshman	Catchers: 13 Geana Torres - Sophomore; 23 Julie Rawls - Senior; Sophie Piskos - Freshman; Infielders: 7 Alaina Guarino - Senior; 8 Taylor Roman - Freshman; 12 Brittany Holland - Sophomore; 17 Bailey Curry - Junior; 21 Melissa Mayeux - Junior; 22 Alissa Dalton - Senior; 27 Mia Camuso - Junior; 44 Kourtney Gremillion - Junior; 99 Sydnee Hebert - Freshman; Mia Cantu - Freshman; Delaney Enlow - Freshman; Addie Lightner - Freshman; Kyleigh Sand - Freshman; Utility: 3 Jolie Readeaux - Junior

=== Coaching staff ===
2020 Louisiana Ragin' Cajuns coaching staff
- Gerry Glasco – Head Coach – 3rd year
- Mike Roberts – Associate head coach – 2nd year
- Lacy Prejean – Assistant Head Coach – 2nd year
- Taran Alvelo – Volunteer Assistant Coach – 1st year
- Ashley Pauly – Chief of Staff – 2nd year
- Collin Hopkins – Manager
- Zeph Delatte – Manager
- Tambria Bradford – Academic Counselor
- Connor Stanton – Assistant Strength and Conditioning
- Brittany Roberts – Assistant Director of Athletic Training
- Matthew Frakes – Associate Director of Sports Nutrition
- Denee Simon – Office Manager

== Schedule and results ==
Legend
	Louisiana win
	Louisiana loss
	Postponement/Cancellation/Suspensions
**Bold**	Louisiana team member

2020 Louisiana Ragin' Cajuns softball game log
Regular season (18-6)

February (13-5)
Date	Opponent	Rank	Site/stadium	Score	Win	Loss	Save	TV	Attendance	Overall record	SBC record
Louisiana Classics
Feb. 7	Ball State	No. 10	Yvette Girouard Field at Lamson Park • Lafayette, LA	**W** 3-2	**Ellyson** (1-0)	Rothwell (0-1)	**Kleist** (1)	Ragin' Cajuns Digital Network		1-0	
Feb. 7	UTSA	No. 10	Yvette Girouard Field at Lamson Park • Lafayette, LA	**W** 8-0 (5 inn)	**Kleist** (1-0)	Carpenter (0-1)	None	Ragin' Cajuns Digital Network	2,173	2-0	
Feb. 8	North Texas	No. 10	Yvette Girouard Field at Lamson Park • Lafayette, LA	**L** 1-2	Trautwein (1-1)	**Kleist** (1-1)	None	Ragin' Cajuns Digital Network		2-1	
Feb. 8	UTSA	No. 10	Yvette Girouard Field at Lamson Park • Lafayette, LA	**W** 11-1 (5 inn)	**Ellyson** (2-0)	Cortez (1-1)	None	Ragin' Cajuns Digital Network	2,033	3-1	
Feb. 11	Lamar	No. 13	Yvette Girouard Field at Lamson Park • Lafayette, LA	**W** 8-0 (6 inn)	**Ellyson** (3-0)	Kyle (0-2)	None	Ragin' Cajuns Digital Network	1,875	4-1	
Feb. 14	North Dakota	No. 13	Yvette Girouard Field at Lamson Park • Lafayette, LA	**W** 9-1 (5 inn)	**Kleist** (2-1)	Pica (1-1)	None	Ragin' Cajuns Digital Network	1,904	5-1	
Feb. 15	Samford	No. 13	Yvette Girouard Field at Lamson Park • Lafayette, LA	**W** 7-0	**Ellyson** (4-0)	DeCelles (1-2)	None		3,107	6-1	
Feb. 15	No. 7 LSU	No. 13	Yvette Girouard Field at Lamson Park • Lafayette, LA	**W** 2-1	**Kleist** (3-1)	Gorsuch (1-1)	None	CST/ESPN+	3,107	7-1	
Feb. 16	at No. 7 LSU	No. 13	Tiger Park • Baton Rouge, LA	**L** 3-4	Kilponen (2-0)	**Kleist** (3-2)	None	SECN+/ESPN+	2,246	7-2	
UAB Blazer Classics
Feb. 21	vs. No. 14 Oklahoma State	No. 11	Mary Bowers Field • Birmingham, AL	**L** 0-1	Eberle (4-1)	**Kleist** (3-3)	None		174	7-3	
Feb. 22	vs. No. 14 Oklahoma State	No. 11	Mary Bowers Field • Birmingham, AL	**W** 3-2	**Ellyson** (5-0)	Maxwell (2-3)	None		176	8-3	
Feb. 22	vs. Ole Miss	No. 11	Mary Bowers Field • Birmingham, AL	**W** 5-3	**Kleist** (4-3)	Jacobsen (2-3)	**Ellyson** (1)		194	9-3	
Feb. 23	vs. Ole Miss	No. 11	Mary Bowers Field • Birmingham, AL	**W** 8-1	**Ellyson** (6-0)	Borgen (2-1)	None		308	10-3	
Feb. 23	at UAB	No. 11	Mary Bowers Field • Birmingham, AL	**W** 7-4	**Ellyson** (7-0)	Woodham (3-3)	None	C-USA.TV	268	11-3	
Feb. 25	at No. 3 Texas	No. 10	Red and Charline McCombs Field • Austin, TX	**W** 3-2	**Kleist** (5-3)	Elish (7-2)	None	Longhorn Network	1,036	12-3	
Feb. 25	at No. 3 Texas	No. 10	Red and Charline McCombs Field • Austin, TX	**L** 1-2	O'Leary (4-0)	**Ellyson** (7-1)	Elish (1)		1,036	12-4	
Feb. 28	at No. 7 Florida	No. 10	Katie Seashole Pressly Softball Stadium • Gainesville, FL	**L** 0-6	Chronister (1-0)	**Kleist** (5-4)	None	SECN+/ESPN+	1,186	12-5	
Feb. 29	at No. 7 Florida	No. 10	Katie Seashole Pressly Softball Stadium • Gainesville, FL	**W** 7-5	**Ellyson** (8-1)	Trlicek (7-2)	**Kleist** (2)	SECN+/ESPN+	1,484	13-5	

March (5-1)
Date	Opponent	Rank	Site/stadium	Score	Win	Loss	Save	TV	Attendance	Overall record	SBC record
Mar. 1	at No. 7 Florida	No. 10	Katie Seashole Pressly Softball Stadium • Gainesville, FL	**W** 7-6	**Ellyson** (9-1)	Lugo (6-2)	None	SECN+/ESPN+	1,509	14-5	
Mar. 4	Campbell	No. 8	Yvette Girouard Field at Lamson Park • Lafayette, LA	Game cancelled due to heavy, continued rains in Lafayette							
Mar. 6	at Coastal Carolina	No. 8	St. John Stadium–Charles Wade-John Lott Field • Conway, SC	**L** 1-7	Marcano (3-0)	**Kleist** (5-5)	None		243	14-6	0-1
Mar. 7	at Coastal Carolina	No. 8	St. John Stadium–Charles Wade-John Lott Field • Conway, SC	**W** 5-0	**Ellyson** (10-1)	BeasleyPolko (4-4)	None		356	15-6	1-1
Mar. 8	at Coastal Carolina	No. 8	St. John Stadium–Charles Wade-John Lott Field • Conway, SC	**W** 10-2 (5 inn)	**Kleist** (6-5)	BeasleyPolko (4-5)	None		342	16-6	2-1
Mar. 11	Sam Houston State	No. 8	Yvette Girouard Field at Lamson Park • Lafayette, LA	**W** 19-0 (5 inn)	**Ellyson** (11-1)	Bailey (1-4)	None	Ragin' Cajuns Digital Network	17-6	,031	
Mar. 11	Sam Houston State	No. 8	Yvette Girouard Field at Lamson Park • Lafayette, LA	**W** 15-0 (5 inn)	**Kleist** (7-5)	Sanchez (2-5)	None	Ragin' Cajuns Digital Network	18-6	2,031	
Mar. 13	Appalachian State		Yvette Girouard Field at Lamson Park • Lafayette, LA	Season suspended due to COVID-19 pandemic							
Mar. 14	Appalachian State		Yvette Girouard Field at Lamson Park • Lafayette, LA	Season suspended due to COVID-19 pandemic							
Mar. 15	Appalachian State		Yvette Girouard Field at Lamson Park • Lafayette, LA	Season suspended due to COVID-19 pandemic							
Mar. 18	at McNeese State		Joe Miller Field at Cowgirl Diamond • Lake Charles, LA	Season suspended due to COVID-19 pandemic							
Mar. 20	at Georgia State		Robert E. Heck Softball Complex • Atlanta, GA	Season suspended due to COVID-19 pandemic							
Mar. 21	at Georgia State		Robert E. Heck Softball Complex • Atlanta, GA	Season suspended due to COVID-19 pandemic							
Mar. 22	at Georgia State		Robert E. Heck Softball Complex • Atlanta, GA	Season suspended due to COVID-19 pandemic							
Mar. 27	Texas State		Yvette Girouard Field at Lamson Park • Lafayette, LA	Season suspended due to COVID-19 pandemic							
Mar. 28	Texas State		Yvette Girouard Field at Lamson Park • Lafayette, LA	Season suspended due to COVID-19 pandemic							
Mar. 29	Texas State		Yvette Girouard Field at Lamson Park • Lafayette, LA	Season suspended due to COVID-19 pandemic							

April (0–0)
Date	Opponent	Rank	Site/stadium	Score	Win	Loss	Save	TV	Attendance	Overall record	SBC record
Apr. 1	McNeese State		Yvette Girouard Field at Lamson Park • Lafayette, LA	Season suspended due to COVID-19 pandemic							
Apr. 3	South Alabama		Yvette Girouard Field at Lamson Park • Lafayette, LA	Season suspended due to COVID-19 pandemic							
Apr. 4	South Alabama		Yvette Girouard Field at Lamson Park • Lafayette, LA	Season suspended due to COVID-19 pandemic							
Apr. 5	South Alabama		Yvette Girouard Field at Lamson Park • Lafayette, LA	Season suspended due to COVID-19 pandemic							
Apr. 7	at Southeastern Louisiana		North Oak Park • Hammond, LA	Season suspended due to COVID-19 pandemic							
Apr. 9	at Troy		Troy Softball Complex • Troy, AL	Season suspended due to COVID-19 pandemic							
Apr. 10	at Troy		Troy Softball Complex • Troy, AL	Season suspended due to COVID-19 pandemic							
Apr. 11	at Troy		Troy Softball Complex • Troy, AL	Season suspended due to COVID-19 pandemic							
Apr. 13	at Florida State		JoAnne Graf Field at the Seminoles Softball Complex • Tallahassee, FL	Season suspended due to COVID-19 pandemic							
Apr. 14	at Florida State		JoAnne Graf Field at the Seminole Softball Complex • Tallahassee, FL	Season suspended due to COVID-19 pandemic							
Apr. 15	at Alabama		Rhoads Stadium • Tuscaloosa, AL	Season suspended due to COVID-19 pandemic							
Apr. 17	Georgia Southern		Yvette Girouard Field at Lamson Park • Lafayette, LA	Season suspended due to COVID-19 pandemic							
Apr. 18	Georgia Southern		Yvette Girouard Field at Lamson Park • Lafayette, LA	Season suspended due to COVID-19 pandemic							
Apr. 19	Georgia Southern		Yvette Girouard Field at Lamson Park • Lafayette, LA	Season suspended due to COVID-19 pandemic							
Apr. 24	at UT Arlington		Allan Saxe Field • Arlington, TX	Season suspended due to COVID-19 pandemic							
Apr. 25	at UT Arlington		Allan Saxe Field • Arlington, TX	Season suspended due to COVID-19 pandemic							
Apr. 26	at UT Arlington		Allan Saxe Field • Arlington, TX	Season suspended due to COVID-19 pandemic							
Apr. 29	Louisiana Tech		Yvette Girouard Field at Lamson Park • Lafayette, LA	Season suspended due to COVID-19 pandemic							
Apr. 30	Louisiana–Monroe		Yvette Girouard Field at Lamson Park • Lafayette, LA	Season suspended due to COVID-19 pandemic							

May (0-0)
Date	Opponent	Rank	Site/stadium	Score	Win	Loss	Save	TV	Attendance	Overall record	SBC record
May 1	Louisiana–Monroe		Yvette Girouard Field at Lamson Park • Lafayette, LA	Season suspended due to COVID-19 pandemic							
May 2	Louisiana–Monroe		Yvette Girouard Field at Lamson Park • Lafayette, LA	Season suspended due to COVID-19 pandemic							

Post-Season (0-0)

SBC tournament (0-0)
Date	Opponent	(Seed)/Rank	Site/stadium	Score	Win	Loss	Save	TV	Attendance	Overall record	SBC record
May 6	TBD		Robert E. Heck Softball Complex • Atlanta, GA	Championship Series canceled to COVID-19 pandemic							

Schedule source:

*Rankings are based on the team's current ranking in the NFCA/USA Softball poll.

== Rankings ==
Ranking movements Legend: ██ Increase in ranking ██ Decrease in ranking
	Week					
Poll	Pre	1	2	3	4	Final
NFCA / USA Today	10	13	11	10	8	8
Softball America	8	18	9	8	5	9
ESPN.com/USA Softball	10	14	10	9	7	8
D1Softball	8	12	10	7	6	7
