= 2026 Louisiana Ragin' Cajuns softball team =

American college softball season

2026 Louisiana Ragin' Cajuns softball
- Conference: Sun Belt Conference
- Record: 29-27 (11–13 SBC)
- Head coach: Alyson Habetz (2nd season)
- Assistant coaches: Lacy Prejean; Bill Shipman; Kyle Brady
- Home stadium: Yvette Girouard Field at Lamson Park

2026 Sun Belt Conference softball standings
	Conf.				Overall
Team	W		L	PCT	W		L	PCT
Louisiana–Monroe ‍†‍‍	19	–	5	.792	38	–	20	.655
Marshall ‍‍‍^{y}	17	–	7	.708	38	–	19	.667
Texas State ‍‍‍^{y}	16	–	8	.667	39	–	22	.639
Southern Miss ‍‍‍	14	–	10	.583	33	–	24	.579
South Alabama ‍‍‡‍^{y}	13	–	11	.542	32	–	27	.542
James Madison ‍‍‍	13	–	11	.542	27	–	24	.529
Louisiana ‍‍‍	11	–	13	.458	29	–	27	.518
Georgia Southern ‍‍‍	11	–	13	.458	24	–	29	.453
Troy ‍‍‍	10	–	14	.417	32	–	22	.593
Appalachian State ‍‍‍	8	–	16	.333	29	–	21	.580
Coastal Carolina ‍‍‍	8	–	16	.333	26	–	31	.456
Georgia State ‍‍‍	4	–	20	.167	25	–	31	.446
† – Conference champion ‡ – Tournament champion y – Invited to the NCAA tournament As of May 17, 2026; Rankings from NFCA/USA Today

The 2026 Louisiana Ragin' Cajuns softball team represented the University of Louisiana at Lafayette during the 2026 NCAA Division I softball season. The Ragin' Cajuns played their home games at Yvette Girouard Field at Lamson Park and were led by second-year head coach Alyson Habetz. They were members of the Sun Belt Conference.

== Personnel ==
2026 Louisiana Ragin' Cajuns softball team
Players
Coaches

#	Pos.	Name	Bats/throws	Height	Year	Home town
0	INF	Mia Liscano	L/R	5 ft 6 in (1.68 m)	Jr	Austin, Texas
1	INF	Kennedy Marceaux	R/R	5 ft 5 in (1.65 m)	So	Kaplan, Louisiana
2	INF	Brooke Otto	R/R	5 ft 5 in (1.65 m)	Jr	Smithville, Texas
3	INF	Madyson Manning	R/R	5 ft 9 in (1.75 m)	Jr	West Monroe, Louisiana
4	OF	Erin Ardoin	L/R	5 ft 5 in (1.65 m)		Moss Bluff, Louisiana
5	P	Bailey Mackles	R/R	5 ft 8 in (1.73 m)	Fr	Slidell, Louisiana
7	OF	Dayzja Williams	L/L	5 ft 5 in (1.65 m)	Jr	Alexandria, Louisiana
8	INF	Haley Hart	R/R	5 ft 5 in (1.65 m)	Fr	Spanish Fort, Alabama
9	INF	Cecilia Vasquez	R/R	5 ft 6 in (1.68 m)	Sr	New Waverly, Texas
11	C	Mia Norwood	R/R	5 ft 2 in (1.57 m)	So	Stonewall, Louisiana
12	INF	Gabbie Stutes	L/R	5 ft 3 in (1.6 m)	So	Lafayette, Louisiana
13	C	Miki Watts	L/R	5 ft 5 in (1.65 m)	Fr	Loranger, Louisiana
15	P	Julianne Tipton	R/R	5 ft 7 in (1.7 m)	So	Mount Carmel, Tennessee
16	P	Lexie Delbrey	R/R	5 ft 6 in (1.68 m)	Sr	Bainbridge, Georgia
17	P	Sage Hoover	R/R	5 ft 7 in (1.7 m)	Jr	Edgewood, Texas
20	OF	Lily Knox (redshirt)	R/R	5 ft 11 in (1.8 m)	Fr	Simi Valley, California
21	INF	Lillian Soto	R/R	5 ft 9 in (1.75 m)	So	Ruston, Louisiana
22	INF	Kennedy Stutes	R/R	5 ft 6 in (1.68 m)	Fr	Lafayette, Louisiana
23	INF	Emily Smith	R/R	5 ft 8 in (1.73 m)	So	Kountze, Texas
24	C	McKayla Ferguson	R/R	5 ft 5 in (1.65 m)	Sr	Plaquemine, Louisiana
33	C	Natalie Johnson	R/R	5 ft 10 in (1.78 m)	Fr	Mint Hill, North Carolina
77	P	Bethany Noble	R/R	6 ft 1 in (1.85 m)	Sr	Amarillo, Texas

Head coach

Alyson Habetz (Louisiana)

Assistant coach(es)

Lacy Prejean (Alabama)
Bill Shipman (Southern New Hampshire)
Kyle Brady (Dayton)

Legend

- (C) Team captain
- (S) Suspended
- (I) Ineligible
- Injured
- Current redshirt

Roster
Last update: 27 December 2025

== Schedule and results ==
Legend
	Louisiana win
	Louisiana loss
	Postponement/Cancellation
**Bold**	Louisiana team member

2026 Louisiana Ragin' Cajuns softball game log
Regular season (28–26)

February (14–7)
Date	Opponent	Rank	Site/stadium	Score	Win	Loss	Save	TV	Attendance	Overall record	SBC record
Louisiana Classic
Feb. 6	Tulsa		Yvette Girouard Field at Lamson Park • Lafayette, LA	**W** 6–3	**Tipton** (1-0)	Maples (0-1)	None	ESPN+	1,714	1–0	
Feb. 6	Jacksonville State		Yvette Girouard Field at Lamson Park • Lafayette, LA	**W** 8–7	**Tipton** (2-0)	Holmes (1-1)	None	ESPN+	1,714	2–0	
Feb. 7	North Texas		Yvette Girouard Field at Lamson Park • Lafayette, LA	**W** 10–5	**Hoover** (1-0)	Harman (0-2)	None		1,757	3–0	
Feb. 7	Jacksonville State		Yvette Girouard Field at Lamson Park • Lafayette, LA	**L** 7–9	Moore (1-0)	**Mackles** (0-1)	None		1,757	3–1	
Ragin' Cajun Invitational
Feb. 13	No. 21 Ole Miss		Yvette Girouard Field at Lamson Park • Lafayette, LA	**L** 2–5	Aycock (3-1)	**Hoover** (1-1)	None		1,699	3–2	
Feb. 13	Texas A&M–Corpus Christi		Yvette Girouard Field at Lamson Park • Lafayette, LA	**W** 5–1	**Delbrey** (1-0)	Whitehead (0-3)	None		1,699	4–2	
Feb. 14	No. 21 Ole Miss		Yvette Girouard Field at Lamson Park • Lafayette, LA	**W** 8–5	**Hoover** (2-1)	Kennedy (0-1)	None	ESPN+	1,799	5–2	
Feb. 14	Prairie View A&M		Yvette Girouard Field at Lamson Park • Lafayette, LA	**L** 5–6	Stewart (1-1)	**Mackles** (0-2)	None	ESPN+	1,799	5–3	
Feb. 15	Texas A&M–Corpus Christi		Yvette Girouard Field at Lamson Park • Lafayette, LA	**W** 23–0^{5}	Aycock (3-1)	**Hoover** (1-1)	None		1,699	6–3	
Feb. 17	at No. 6 Florida State		JoAnne Graf Field at the Seminole Softball Complex • Tallahassee, FL	**L** 0–8^{5}	Dimitrijevic (1-0)	**Delbrey** (1-1)	None	ACCNX	696	6–4	
Purple and Gold Challenge
Feb. 20	vs. Howard		Tiger Park • Baton Rouge, LA	**W** 4–0	**Noble** (2-0)	Conaway (3-3)	None			7–4	
Feb. 20	vs. Michigan State		Tiger Park • Baton Rouge, LA	**W** 6–1	**Tipton** (3-0)	Cassady (1-3)	None			8–4	
Feb. 21	vs. Howard		Tiger Park • Baton Rouge, LA	**W** 6–3	**Delbrey** (2-1)	Conaway (1-5)	**Noble** (1)			9–4	
Feb. 21	at No. 19 LSU		Tiger Park • Baton Rouge, LA	**L** 1–2^{10}	Heavener (4-2)	**Hoover** (2-2)	None	SECN+	1,780	9–5	
Cajun AC Louisiana Clash
Feb. 22	vs. Missouri		Joe Miller Field at Cowgirl Diamond • Lake Charles, LA	**W** 9–1^{6}	**Noble** (3-0)	Carr (2-2)	None		135	10–5	
Feb. 22	vs. Houston		Joe Miller Field at Cowgirl Diamond • Lake Charles, LA	**L** 0–10^{6}	Brown (6-0)	**Tipton** (3-1)	None		135	10–6	
Feb. 24	Northern Iowa		Yvette Girouard Field at Lamson Park • Lafayette, LA	**W** 10–2^{6}	**Mackles** (1-2)	McDermott (1-2)	None	ESPN+	1,462	11–6	
Texas A&M Invite
Feb. 27	vs. Saint Mary's		Davis Diamond • College Station, TX	**W** 6–1	**Noble** (4-0)	Nishikawa (3-1)	None			12–6	
Feb. 27	at No. 13 Texas A&M		Davis Diamond • College Station, TX	**W** 10–8	**Hoover** (3-2)	Peters (4-2)	**Noble** (2)	SECN+	2,622	13–6	
Feb. 28	vs. Kennesaw State		Davis Diamond • College Station, TX	**W** 14–4	**Delbrey** (3-1)	Limberger (0-5)	None			14–6	
Feb. 28	vs. Saint Mary's		David Diamond • College Station, TX	**L** 2–5	Vasquez (3-2)	**Hoover** (3-3)	None			14–7	

March (6–9)
Date	Opponent	Rank	Site/stadium	Score	Win	Loss	Save	TV	Attendance	Overall record	SBC record
Texas A&M Invite
Mar. 1	at No. 13 Texas A&M		Davis Diamond • College Station, TX	**L** 1–5	Lessentine (6-1)	**Noble** (4-1)	None	SECN+	2,427	14–8	
Okana Invitational
Mar. 7	vs. Abilene Christian	**W** 10–3	Love's Field • Norman, OK	**Noble** (5-1)	Beeman (0-8)	None			475	15–8	
Mar. 7	at No. 6 Oklahoma		Love's Field • Norman, OK	**L** 0–10^{5}	Lowry (11-1)	**Hoover** (3-4)	None	SECN+	3,909	15–9	
Mar. 8	vs. Abilene Christian		Love's Field • Norman, OK	**W** 11–1	**Hoover** (4-4)	Snipes (0-4)	None			16–9	
Mar. 8	at No. 6 Oklahoma		Love's Field • Norman, OK	**L** 1–2	Guachino (7-0)	**Noble** (5-2)	Lowry (1)	SECN+		16–10	
Mar. 13	at Southern Miss		Southern Miss Softball Complex • Hattiesburg, MS	**L** 1–6	Giardina (9-2)	**Hoover** (4-5)	None	ESPN+	668	16–11	0–1
Mar. 14	at Southern Miss		Southern Miss Softball Complex • Hattiesburg, MS	**W** 9–1^{5}	**Noble** (6-2)	Graham (5-3)	None	ESPN+	681	17–11	1–1
Mar. 15	at Southern Miss		Southern Miss Softball Complex • Hattiesburg, MS	**L** 1–9^{5}	Giardina (10-2)	**Noble** (6-3)	None	ESPN+	621	17–12	1–2
Mar. 20	Texas State		Yvette Girouard Field at Lamson Park • Lafayette, LA	**W** 2–1	**Hoover** (5-5)	Azua (13-7)	None	ESPN+	1,669	18–12	2–2
Mar. 21	Texas State		Yvette Girouard Field at Lamson Park • Lafayette, LA	**L** 2–4	Witherell (2-0)	**Noble** (6-4)	Azua (3)	ESPN+	1,803	18–13	2–3
Mar. 22	Texas State		Yvette Girouard Field at Lamson Park • Lafayette, LA	**W** 6–1	**Hoover** (6-5)	Azua (13-8)	None	ESPN+	1,592	19–13	3–3
Mar. 24	McNeese		Yvette Girouard Field at Lamson Park • Lafayette, LA	**W** 5–2	**Noble** (7-4)	Taylor (6-3)	**Hoover** (1)	ESPN+	1,554	20–13	
Mar. 27	at Louisiana–Monroe		Geo-Surfaces Field at the ULM Softball Complex • Monroe, LA	**L** 1–4	McDade (8-8)	**Hoover** (6-6)	None	ESPN+	867	20–14	3–4
Mar. 28	at Louisiana–Monroe		Geo-Surfaces Field at the ULM Softball Complex • Monroe, LA	**L** 4–5	McDade (9-8)	**Delbrey** (3-2)	None	ESPN+	1,003	20–15	3–5
Mar. 29	at Louisiana–Monroe		Geo-Surfaces Field at the ULM Softball Complex • Monroe, LA	**L** 5–7	Waggoner (6-3)	**Hoover** (6-7)	McDade (2)	ESPN+	1,097	20–16	3–6

April (7–9)
Date	Opponent	Rank	Site/stadium	Score	Win	Loss	Save	TV	Attendance	Overall record	SBC record
Apr. 2	Troy		Yvette Girouard Field at Lamson Park • Lafayette, LA	**L** 4–5	Lovell (7-4)	**Hoover** (6-8)	Cunningham (2)	ESPN+	1,520	20–17	3–7
Apr. 3	Troy		Yvette Girouard Field at Lamson Park • Lafayette, LA	**W** 11–7	**Tipton** (4-1)	Cunningham (6-3)	None	ESPN+	1,625	21–17	4–7
Apr. 4	Troy		Yvette Girouard Field at Lamson Park • Lafayette, LA	**W** 5–4^{8}	**Hoover** (7-8)	Money (2-2)	None	ESPN+	1,622	22–17	5–7
Apr. 8	at No. 17 Virginia		Palmer Park • Charlottesville, VA	**L** 4–5	Bigham (11-1)	**Tipton** (4-2)	None	ACCNX	232	22–18	
Apr. 10	at James Madison		Bank of the James Field at Veterans Memorial Park • Harrisonburg, VA	**L** 2–6	Johnson (5-7)	**Hoover** (7-9)	Fleet (11)	ESPN+	478	22–19	5–8
Apr. 11	at James Madison		Bank of the James Field at Veterans Memorial Park • Harrisonburg, VA	**L** 2–10^{5}	Johnson (6-7)	**Tipton** (4-3)	None	ESPN+	436	22–20	5–9
Apr. 12	at James Madison		Bank of the James Field at Veterans Memorial Park • Harrisonburg, VA	**L** 9–15	List (6-10)	**Tipton** (4-4)	None	ESPN+	380	22–21	5–10
Apr. 14	No. 22 LSU		Yvette Girouard Field at Lamson Park • Lafayette, LA	**L** 0–8^{5}	Heavener (11-6)	**Tipton** (4-5)	None	ESPN+	2,607	22–22	
Apr. 17	Coastal Carolina		Yvette Girouard Field at Lamson Park • Lafayette, LA	**W** 12–4^{5}	**Hoover** (8-9)	Metzger (4-3)	None	ESPN+	1,576	23–22	6–10
Apr. 18	Coastal Carolina		Yvette Girouard Field at Lamson Park • Lafayette, LA	**W** 8–6	**Hoover** (9-9)	Jones (2-2)	None	ESPN+	1,620	24–22	7–10
Apr. 19	Coastal Carolina		Yvette Girouard Field at Lamson Park • Lafayette, LA	**W** 8–2	**Noble** (8-4)	Childers (2-7)	None	ESPN+	1,531	25–22	8–10
Apr. 21	at McNeese		Joe Miller Field at Cowgirl Diamond • Lake Charles, LA	**L** 3–4	Taylor (11-6)	**Mackles** (1-3)	Taylor (2)	ESPN+	807	25–23	
Apr. 24	Marshall		Yvette Girouard Field at Lamson Park • Lafayette, LA	**W** 3–2	**Hoover** (10-9)	King (14-6)	None	ESPN+	1,490	26–23	9–10
Apr. 25	Marshall		Yvette Girouard Field at Lamson Park • Lafayette, LA	**W** 5–3	**Noble** (9-4)	Veal (10-3)	None	ESPN+	1,534	27–23	10–10
Apr. 26	Marshall		Yvette Girouard Field at Lamson Park • Lafayette, LA	**L** 2–3	King (15-6)	**Hoover** (10-10)	None	ESPN+	1,495	27–24	10–11
Apr. 30	at South Alabama		Jaguar Field • Mobile, AL	**L** 0–4	Harrison (14-11)	**Hoover**(10-11)	None	ESPN+	421	27–25	10–12

May (2–2)
Date	Opponent	Rank	Site/stadium	Score	Win	Loss	Save	TV	Attendance	Overall record	SBC record
May 2	at South Alabama		Jaguar Field • Mobile, AL	**W** 2–1	**Tipton** (5-5)	Harrison (14-12)	None	ESPN+	667	28–25	11–12
May 2	at South Alabama		Jaguar Field • Mobile, AL	**L** 3–4	Harrison (15-12)	**Hoover** (10-12)	None	ESPN+	667	28–26	11–13

Postseason (1–1)

SBC Tournament (1–1)
Date	Opponent	(Seed)/Rank	Site/stadium	Score	Win	Loss	Save	TV	Attendance	Overall record	Tournament record
May 6	vs. (9) Troy	(8)	Yvette Girouard Field at Lamson Park • Lafayette, LA	**W** 5–0	**Hoover** (11-12)	Lovell (8-6)	None	ESPN+	826	29–26	1–0
May 7	vs. (1) Louisiana–Monroe	(8)	Yvette Girouard Field at Lamson Park • Lafayette, LA	**L** 0–3	McDade (18-8)	**Noble** (9-5)	None	ESPN+	784	29–27	1–1

Schedule source:

*Rankings are based on the team's current ranking in the NFCA/USA Softball poll.
