= 2026 Sun Belt Conference softball tournament =

- Teams: 10
- Format: Single-elimination tournament
- Finals site: Yvette Girouard Field at Lamson Park; Lafayette, Louisiana
- Champions: South Alabama (4th title)
- Winning coach: Becky Clark (4th title)
- MVP: Ryley Harrison (South Alabama)
- Television: ESPN+, ESPN2

2026 Sun Belt Conference softball standings
	Conf.				Overall
Team	W		L	PCT	W		L	PCT
Louisiana–Monroe ‍†‍‍	19	–	5	.792	38	–	20	.655
Marshall ‍‍‍^{y}	17	–	7	.708	37	–	17	.685
Texas State ‍‍‍^{y}	16	–	8	.667	38	–	20	.655
Southern Miss ‍‍‍	14	–	10	.583	33	–	24	.579
South Alabama ‍‍‡‍^{y}	13	–	11	.542	32	–	25	.561
James Madison ‍‍‍	13	–	11	.542	27	–	24	.529
Louisiana ‍‍‍	11	–	13	.458	29	–	27	.518
Georgia Southern ‍‍‍	11	–	13	.458	24	–	29	.453
Troy ‍‍‍	10	–	14	.417	32	–	22	.593
Appalachian State ‍‍‍	8	–	16	.333	29	–	21	.580
Coastal Carolina ‍‍‍	8	–	16	.333	26	–	31	.456
Georgia State ‍‍‍	4	–	20	.167	25	–	31	.446
† – Conference champion ‡ – Tournament champion y – Invited to the NCAA tournament As of May 9, 2026; Rankings from NFCA/USA Today

The 2026 Sun Belt Conference softball tournament was held at Yvette Girouard Field at Lamson Park on the campus of University of Louisiana at Lafayette in Lafayette, Louisiana from May 6 through May 9, 2026. The tournament was won by the South Alabama Jaguars, who earned the Sun Belt Conference's automatic bid to the 2026 NCAA Division I softball tournament.

== Format and seeding ==
The top ten finishers of the league's twelve teams from the regular season qualified for the tournament. The top six seeds received a single bye to the quarterfinals, with the remaining teams playing opening round games.

== Tournament ==
First round
7	Georgia Southern	2
10	Coastal Carolina	6
8	Louisiana	5
9	Troy	0

Quarterfinals
2	Marshall	0
10	Coastal Carolina	6
3	Texas State	5
6	James Madison	2
1	Louisiana–Monroe	3
8	Louisiana	0
4	Southern Miss	0
5	South Alabama	13^{(5)}

Semifinals
10	Coastal Carolina	2
3	Texas State	10^{(6)}
1	Louisiana–Monroe	1
5	South Alabama	3

Finals
3	Texas State	2
5	South Alabama	3

== All Tournament Team ==
Player	Team
**Ryley Harrison**	South Alabama
Olivia Branstetter	South Alabama
Kara Wine	South Alabama
Lillie Stagner	South Alabama
Kate Bubela	Texas State
Kat Zarate	Texas State
Harley Vestal	Texas State
Georgia Hood	Coastal Carolina
Libby Pippin	Coastal Carolina
Meagan Brown	Louisiana–Monroe

MVP in bold
