= 2014 Georgia State Panthers softball team =

American college softball season

2014 Georgia State Panthers softball
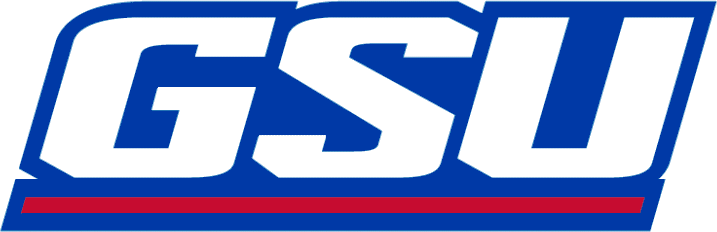
- Conference: Sun Belt Conference
- Record: 30–26 (12–9 SBC)
- Head coach: Roger Kincaid
- Home stadium: Robert E. Heck Baseball Complex

2014 Sun Belt Conference softball standings
	Conf.						Overall
Team	W		L		T	PCT	W		L		T	PCT
No. 8 Louisiana–Lafayette ‍†‍‡‍^{y}	19	–	1	–	0	.950	49	–	10	–	1	.825
No. 23 South Alabama ‍‍‍^{y}	15	–	6	–	0	.714	42	–	14	–	0	.750
Georgia State ‍‍‍	12	–	9	–	0	.571	30	–	26	–	0	.536
Western Kentucky ‍‍‍	11	–	10	–	0	.524	33	–	24	–	1	.578
Texas State ‍‍‍	9	–	12	–	0	.429	26	–	30	–	0	.464
Louisiana–Monroe ‍‍‍	6	–	14	–	0	.300	25	–	27	–	0	.481
Troy ‍‍‍	5	–	13	–	0	.278	22	–	30	–	2	.426
UT Arlington ‍‍‍	4	–	16	–	0	.200	21	–	33	–	0	.389
† – Conference champion ‡ – Tournament champion y – Invited to the NCAA tournament As of March 4, 2019; Rankings from NFCA

The 2014 Georgia State Panthers softball team represented Georgia State University in the 2014 NCAA Division I softball season. The Panthers competed in the Sun Belt Conference and were led by four-year head coach Roger Kincaid. Georgia State played its home games at the Robert E. Heck Softball Complex in Panthersville, Georgia. This represented the first season of softball competition in the Sun Belt Conference.

== Roster ==
2012 Georgia State roster
Pitchers: 45 Emily Clay – Senior; 24 Kaitlyn Medlam – Junior; 15 Katie Worley - Sophomore; 27 Eron Milton - Junior	Catchers: 12 Taylor Scarpantonio – Junior; 14 Mandy Blackwell - Freshman; Infielders: 1 Taylor Anderson - "Sophomore"; 7 Shannyn Palazzo - Junior; 8 Callie Alford – Sophomore; 11 Kensey Caldwell - Freshman; 18 Lauren Coleman – Junior; 28 MeQuilla Franklin - Senior; 43 Taylor Thorpe - Freshman; 77 Mallory Koepke - Freshman	Outfielders: 2 Ashley Christy – Junior; 3 Bethany Horne - Junior; 5 Megan Litumbe - Freshman; 9 Morgan Brown - Freshman; 23 Jessica Clifton - Senior

== Schedule ==
2014 Georgia State Panthers Softball Game Log
Regular season
February

#	Date	Opponent	Site/stadium	Score	Overall record	SBC record
1	February 14	Indiana	Bob Heck Field	14-6	1-0	-
2	February 15	Bowling Green	Bob Heck Field	11-1	2-0	-
3	February 15	UT Martin	Bob Heck Field	3-5	2-1	-
4	February 16	Indiana	Bob Heck Field	4-3	3-1	-
5	February 16	ETSU	Bob Heck Field	11-5	4-1	-
6	February 21	Stony Brook	Atlanta, GA	3-2	5-1	-
7	February 22	Stony Brook	Kennesaw, GA	7-5	6-1	-
8	February 22	Kennesaw State	Kennesaw, GA	6-7	6-2	-
9	February 23	#21 Tulsa	Atlanta, GA	2-8	6-3	-
10	February 23	Georgia Tech	Atlanta, GA	1-5	6-4	-
11	February 26	Mercer	Bob Heck Field	17-3	7-4	-
12	February 26	Mercer	Bob Heck Field	5-11	7-5	-
13	February 28	St. Bonaventure	Clearwater, FL	8-1	8-5	-
14	February 28	Central Connecticut	Clearwater, FL	4-2	9-5	-

March

#	Date	Opponent	Site/stadium	Score	Overall record	SBC record
15	March 1	Quinnipiac	Clearwater, FL	10-2	10-5	-
16	March 1	Stanford	Clearwater, FL	1-7	10-6	-
17	March 2	Western Michigan	Clearwater, FL	6-1	11-6	-
18	March 9	Presbyterian	Clinton, SC	0-6	10-7	-
19	March 9	Presbyterian	Clinton, SC	3-4	10-8	-
20	March 12	Mississippi State	Bob Heck Field	9-16	10-9	-
21	March 14	Minnesota	Myrtle Beach, SC	0-7	10-10	-
22	March 14	Coastal Carolina	Myrtle Beach, SC	0-2	10-11	-
23	March 15	Fordham	Myrtle Beach, SC	1-5	10-12	-
24	March 15	Coastal Carolina	Myrtle Beach, SC	3-1	11-12	-
25	March 16	College of Charleston	Myrtle Beach, SC	Cancelled	-	-
26	March 18	Kennesaw State	Bob Heck Field	7-5	12-12	-
27	March 19	#7 Alabama	Tuscaloosa, AL	1-3	12-13	-
28	March 22	#20 Louisiana	Bob Heck Field	3-8	12-14	0–1
29	March 22	#20 Louisiana	Bob Heck Field	2-4	12-15	0–2
30	March 23	#20 Louisiana	Bob Heck Field	0-13	12-16	0–3
31	March 25	Kennesaw State	Kennesaw, GA	8-0	13-16	-
32	March 26	Auburn	Bob Heck Field	1-16	13-17	0–3
33	March 29	Troy	Troy, AL	6-4	14-17	1–3
34	March 29	Troy	Troy, AL	6-9	14-18	1–4
35	March 30	Troy	Troy, AL	6-1	15-18	2–4

April

#	Date	Opponent	Site/stadium	Score	Overall record	SBC record
36	April 2	Furman	Greenville, SC	9-1	16-18	2–4
37	April 2	Furman	Greenville, SC	6-7	16-19	2–4
38	April 5	UT-Arlington	Bob Heck Field	1-3	16-20	2–5
39	April 5	UT-Arlington	Bob Heck Field	6-4	17-20	3–5
40	April 6	UT-Arlington	Bob Heck Field	4-1	18-20	4–5
41	April 8	Georgia Tech	Atlanta, GA	10-5	19-20	4–5
42	April 9	Troy	Statesboro, GA	2-5	19-21	4–5
43	April 12	Texas State	Bob Heck Field	8-1	20-21	5-5
44	April 12	Texas State	Bob Heck Field	10-2	21-21	6–5
45	April 13	Texas State	Bob Heck Field	3-2	22-21	7–5
46	April 15	Jacksonville State	Jacksonville, AL	10-6	23-21	7–5
47	April 18	#19 South Alabama	Mobile, AL	0-8	23-22	7–6
48	April 18	#19 South Alabama	Mobile, AL	2-1	24-22	8–6
49	April 19	#19 South Alabama	Mobile, AL	1-2	24-23	8–7
50	April 23	#13 Georgia	Athens, GA	4-2	25-23	8–7
51	April 26	ULM	Monroe, LA	3-1	26-23	9–7
52	April 26	ULM	Monroe, LA	14-4	27-23	10–7
53	April 27	ULM	Monroe, LA	0-1	27-24	10–8

May

#	Date	Opponent	Site/stadium	Score	Overall record	SBC record
54	May 2	Western Kentucky	Bob Heck Field	3-2	28-24	11–8
55	May 3	Western Kentucky	Bob Heck Field	6-5	29-24	12–8
56	May 3	Western Kentucky	Bob Heck Field	7-9	29-25	12–9

Sun Belt Tournament

#	Date	Opponent	Site/stadium	Score	Overall record	Tournament record
57	May 7	ULM	Lafayette, LA	1-2	29-26	12–9
