= 2014 Louisiana–Lafayette Ragin' Cajuns softball team =

American college softball season

2014 Louisiana–Lafayette Ragin' Cajuns softball

Women's College World Series Appearance Lafayette Super Regionals champions Lafayette Regionals champions Sun Belt Conference tournament champions Sun Belt Conference regular-season champions

Ragin' Cajun Invitational Champions NFCA Leadoff Classic Champions Gulfport College Classic Champions
- Conference: Sun Belt Conference

Ranking
- Coaches: No. 8
- Record: 49-10-1 (19-1 SBC)
- Head coach: Michael Lotief (14th season)
- Assistant coaches: T. J. Hubbard; Lisa Norris
- Home stadium: Lamson Park

2014 Sun Belt Conference softball standings
	Conf.						Overall
Team	W		L		T	PCT	W		L		T	PCT
No. 8 Louisiana–Lafayette ‍†‍‡‍^{y}	19	–	1	–	0	.950	49	–	10	–	1	.825
No. 23 South Alabama ‍‍‍^{y}	15	–	6	–	0	.714	42	–	14	–	0	.750
Georgia State ‍‍‍	12	–	9	–	0	.571	30	–	26	–	0	.536
Western Kentucky ‍‍‍	11	–	10	–	0	.524	33	–	24	–	1	.578
Texas State ‍‍‍	9	–	12	–	0	.429	26	–	30	–	0	.464
Louisiana–Monroe ‍‍‍	6	–	14	–	0	.300	25	–	27	–	0	.481
Troy ‍‍‍	5	–	13	–	0	.278	22	–	30	–	2	.426
UT Arlington ‍‍‍	4	–	16	–	0	.200	21	–	33	–	0	.389
† – Conference champion ‡ – Tournament champion y – Invited to the NCAA tournament As of March 4, 2019; Rankings from NFCA

The 2014 Louisiana–Lafayette Ragin' Cajuns softball team represented the University of Louisiana at Lafayette in the 2014 NCAA Division I softball season. The Ragin' Cajuns played their home games at Lamson Park and were led by fourteenth year head coach Michael Lotief.

== Preseason ==
=== Sun Belt Conference Coaches Poll ===
The Sun Belt Conference Coaches Poll was released on February 3, 2014. Louisiana-Lafayette was picked to finish first in the Sun Belt Conference with 62 votes and 6 first place votes.

Coaches poll
Predicted finish	Team	Votes (1st place)
1	Louisiana-Lafayette	62 (6)
2	South Alabama	57 (2)
3	Western Kentucky	47
4	Texas State	33
5	Georgia State	30
6	Troy	27
7	UT Arlington	21
8	Louisiana-Monroe	11

=== Preseason All-Sun Belt team ===
- Jordan Wallace (ULL, JR, Pitcher)
- Hannah Campbell (USA, SR, Pitcher)
- Callie Alford (GSU, JR, Catcher)
- Kacie McAllister (TROY, SR, 1st Base)
- Olivia Watkins (WKU, SR, 2nd Base)
- Preslie Cruce (WKU, JR, 3rd Base)
- Kaitlyn Griffin (USA, JR, Shortstop)
- Shellie Landry (ULL, SO, Outfield)
- Blair Johnson (USA, JR, Outfield)
- Jessica Clifton (GSU, SR, Outfield)
- Sara Corbello (ULL, SO, Designated Player)
- Emily Rousseau (WKU, SR, Pitcher At-Large)
- Nina Villanueva (UTA, JR, Shortstop At-Large)
- Callie Alford (GSU, JR, 3rd Base At-Large)
- Britnea Barilli (UTA, SO, Outfield At-Large)

==== Sun Belt Preseason Pitcher of the Year ====
- Jordan Wallace (ULL, JR, Pitcher)

== Roster ==
2014 Louisiana-Lafayette Ragin' Cajuns roster
Pitchers: 7 Jordan Wallace - Junior; 16 Christina Hamilton - Junior; 18 Alex Stewart - Freshman; 24 Macey Smith - Freshman; 29 Lexi Rouse - Freshman; 32 Victoria Brown - Sophomore; Catchers: 9 Linzey Cifreo - Sophomore; 33 Lexie Elkins - Sophomore; Utility Players: 3 Natalie Fernandez - Senior; 4 Kassidy Zeringue - Freshman; 5 Meagan Thomas - Sophomore; 13 Marie Hoag - Sophomore; 21 Samantha Walsh - Sophomore; 22 Shellie Landry - Sophomore; 25 Sara Corbello - Sophomore	Infielders: 6 Taylor Meaux - Sophomore; 12 Gabby Felps - Sophomore; 23 Ciarra Cherry - Freshman; 27 Sarah Arceneaux - Freshman; 28 Kelsey Vincent - Sophomore; 31 Corin Voinché - Freshman; 35 Haley Hayden - Freshman; Outfielders: 8 Aleah Craighton - Redshirt Freshman; 14 Cassidy White - Sophomore; 17 Leandra Maly - Junior; 19 Shelbi Redfearn - Senior; 20 Kendall Smith - Freshman

=== Coaching staff ===
2014 Louisiana-Lafayette Ragin' Cajuns coaching staff
- Michael Lotief – Head coach – 14th year
- T. J. Hubbard – Associate head coach – 2nd year
- Lisa Norris – Assistant head coach - 1st year
- Sarah Draheim – Manager

== Schedule and results ==
Legend
	Louisiana-Lafayette win
	Louisiana-Lafayette loss
	Postponement/Cancellation
**Bold**	Louisiana team member

2014 Louisiana-Lafayette Ragin' Cajuns Softball Game Log
Regular season (41-7-1)

February (11-5-1)
Date	Opponent	Rank	Site/stadium	Score	Win	Loss	Save	TV	Attendance	Overall record	SBC record
Louisiana Classics
Feb. 7	Northern Iowa	No. 13	Lamson Park • Lafayette, LA	**W** 10-8	**Wallace** (1-0)	Fisher (0-1)	None	None	667	1-0	
Feb. 7	Texas	No. 13	Lamson Park • Lafayette, LA	**L** 7-10	Davis (1-0)	**Wallace** (1-1)	None	None	815	1-1	
Feb. 8	North Carolina	No. 13	Lamson Park • Lafayette, LA	**W** 6-5 (10 inn)	**Hamilton** (1-0)	Spingola (1-2)	None	None	681	2-1	
Feb. 8	Texas	No. 13	Lamson Park • Lafayette, LA	**L** 3-7	Smith (2-0)	**Stewart** (0-1)	None	None	1,015	2-2	
Feb. 9	Purdue	No. 13	Lamson Park • Lafayette, LA	**T** 7-7				None	1,109	2-2-1	
Ragin' Cajuns Invitational
Feb. 14	No. 4 Michigan	No. 20	Lamson Park • Lafayette, LA	**W** 8-6	**Wallace** (2-1)	Driesenga (0-2)	None	None	873	3-2-1	
Feb. 14	Valparaiso	No. 20	Lamson Park • Lafayette, LA	**W** 3-2	**Hamilton** (2-0)	Lindeman (1-1)	None	None	852	4-2-1	
Feb. 15	Memphis	No. 20	Lamson Park • Lafayette, LA	**W** 13-2 (6 inn)	**Hamilton** (3-0)	Novak (2-1)	None	None	1,170	5-2-1	
Feb. 15	No. 4 Michigan	No. 20	Lamson Park • Lafayette, LA	**L** 1-15	Wagner (3-0)	**Stewart** (0-2)	None	None	753	5-3-1	
Feb. 16	Central Arkansas	No. 20	Lamson Park • Lafayette, LA	**W** 5-0	**Wallace** (3-1)	Clampitt (1-3)	None	None	1,084	6-3-1	
NFCA Leadoff Classic
Feb. 21	Illinois State	No. 20	Eddie C. Moore Complex • Clearwater, FL	**W** 10-4	**Wallace** (4-1)	Baxter (1-4)	None	None	123	7-3-1	
Feb. 22	Hofstra	No. 20	Eddie C. Moore Complex • Clearwater, FL	**W** 7-4	**Brown** (1-0)	Pirone (0-1)	None	None	211	8-3-1	
Feb. 22	James Madison	No. 20	Eddie C. Moore Complex • Clearwater, FL	**L** 0-3	Ford (4-2)	**Brown** (1-1)	None	None	103	8-4-1	
Feb. 22	South Florida	No. 20	Eddie C. Moore Complex • Clearwater, FL	**L** 5-8	Greiner (1-0)	**Hamilton** (3-1)	Nunn (2)	None	256	8-5-1	
Feb. 23	Rutgers	No. 20	Eddie C. Moore Complex • Clearwater, FL	**W** 4-3	**Wallace** (5-1)	Landrith (3-3)	None	None	129	9-5-1	
Gulfport College Classic
Feb. 28	No. 12 Baylor	No. 24	Gulfport Sportsplex • Gulfport, MS	**W** 11-10	**Brown** (2-1)	Canion (7-3)	**Wallace** (1)	None		10-5-1	
Feb. 28	UTSA	No. 24	Gulfport Sportsplex • Gulfport, MS	**W** 6-2	**Hamilton** (4-1)	Freeze (4-5)	None	None		11-5-1	

March (14-1)
Date	Opponent	Rank	Site/stadium	Score	Win	Loss	Save	TV	Attendance	Overall record	SBC record
Gulfport College Classic
Mar. 1	Chattanooga	No. 24	Gulfport Sportsplex • Gulfport, MS	**W** 6-2	**Hamilton** (5-1)	Henderson (4-3)	None	None		12-5-1	
Mar. 1	Ohio	No. 24	Gulfport Sportsplex • Gulfport, MS	**W** 3-1	**Wallace** (6-1)	Dorsey (9-4)	None	None		13-5-1	
Mar. 2	Memphis	No. 24	Gulfport Sportsplex • Gulfport, MS	**W** 3-2	**Wallace** (7-1)	Roberts (5-4)	**Hamilton** (1)	None		14-5-1	
Mar. 6	Lamar	No. 23	Lamson Park • Lafayette, LA	**W** 14-3	**Hamilton** (6-1)	Schultz (2-4)	None	None	596	15-5-1	
Mar. 14	No. 13 Oklahoma	No. 23	Lamson Park • Lafayette, LA	**L** 5-13	Stevens (12-3)	**Wallace** (7-2)	None	None	1,759	15-6-1	
Mar. 15	No. 13 Oklahoma	No. 23	Lamson Park • Lafayette, LA	**W** 7-0	**Hamilton** (7-1)	Stevens (12-4)	None	None		16-6-1	
Mar. 15	No. 13 Oklahoma	No. 23	Lamson Park • Lafayette, LA	**W** 3-1	**Hamilton** (8-1)	Stevens (12-5)	None	None	1,789	17-6-1	
Mar. 19	Sam Houston State	No. 20	Lamson Park • Lafayette, LA	**W** 6-0	**Hamilton** (9-1)	Lancaster (2-5)	None	None		18-6-1	
Mar. 19	Sam Houston State	No. 20	Lamson Park • Lafayette, LA	**W** 4-2	**Wallace** (8-2)	Baros (5-7)	None	None	1,154	19-6-1	
Mar. 22	at Georgia State	No. 20	Robert E. Heck Softball Complex • Atlanta, GA	**W** 8-3	**Hamilton** (10-1)	Milton (3-3)	None	None		20-6-1	1-0
Mar. 22	at Georgia State	No. 20	Robert E. Heck Softball Complex • Atlanta, GA	**W** 4-2	**Wallace** (9-2)	Worley (0-2)	**Hamilton** (2)	None	231	21-6-1	2-0
Mar. 23	at Georgia State	No. 20	Robert E. Heck Softball Complex • Atlanta, GA	**W** 13-0 (5 inn)	**Hamilton** (11-1)	Worley (0-3)	None	None	226	22-6-1	3-0
Mar. 29	Texas State	No. 20	Lamson Park • Lafayette, LA	**W** 5-2	**Hamilton** (12-1)	House (16-11)	None	None		23-6-1	4-0
Mar. 29	Texas State	No. 20	Lamson Park • Lafayette, LA	**W** 5-2	**Wallace** (10-2)	Wright (2-2)	None	None	1,161	24-6-1	5-0
Mar. 30	Texas State	No. 20	Lamson Park • Lafayette, LA	**W** 8-3	**Wallace** (11-2)	Garner (1-5)	None	None	758	25-6-1	6-0

April (13-1)
Date	Opponent	Rank	Site/stadium	Score	Win	Loss	Save	TV	Attendance	Overall record	SBC record
Apr. 5	at Western Kentucky	No. 21	WKU Softball Complex • Bowling Green, KY	**W** 8-4	**Hamilton** (13-1)	Rousseau (13-8)	None	None		26-6-1	7-0
Apr. 5	at Western Kentucky	No. 21	WKU Softball Complex • Bowling Green, KY	**W** 11-5	**Wallace** (12-2)	Miniard (11-4)	None	None	330	27-6-1	8-0
Apr. 6	at Western Kentucky	No. 21	WKU Softball Complex • Bowling Green, KY	**W** 6-4	**Wallace** (13-2)	Rousseau (13-9)	**Hamilton** (3)	None	126	28-6-1	9-0
Apr. 12	No. 15 South Alabama	No. 18	Lamson Park • Lafayette, LA	**W** 6-2	**Hamilton** (14-1)	Beard (17-4)	None	None		29-6-1	10-0
Apr. 12	No. 15 South Alabama	No. 18	Lamson Park • Lafayette, LA	**L** 4-8	Campbell (13-3)	**Wallace** (13-3)	None	None	2,167	29-7-1	10-1
Apr. 13	No. 15 South Alabama	No. 18	Lamson Park • Lafayette, LA	**W** 5-1	**Hamilton** (15-1)	Campbell (13-4)	None	None	1,145	30-7-1	11-1
Apr. 16	McNeese State	No. 17	Lamson Park • Lafayette, LA	**W** 5-4	**Hamilton** (16-1)	Allred (19-6)	None	None	1,026	31-7-1	
Apr. 19	at Troy	No. 17	Troy Softball Complex • Troy, AL	**W** 5-0	**Hamilton** (17-1)	Affeldt (7-17)	None	None		32-7-1	12-1
Apr. 19	at Troy	No. 17	Troy Softball Complex • Troy, AL	**W** 9-0	**Hamilton** (18-1)	Rainey (6-5)	None	None	217	33-7-1	13-1
Apr. 22	at No. 14 Baylor	No. 16	Getterman Stadium • Waco, TX	**W** 5-2	**Hamilton** (19-1)	Canion (18-9)	None	FSSW		34-7-1	
Apr. 22	at No. 14 Baylor	No. 16	Getterman Stadium • Waco, TX	**W** 7-4	**Brown** (3-1)	Stearns (11-3)	None	FSSW	836	35-7-1	
Apr. 26	at UT Arlington	No. 16	Allan Saxe Field • Arlington, TX	**W** 7-0	**Hamilton** (20-1)	Collins (12-11)	None	None		36-7-1	14-1
Apr. 26	at UT Arlington	No. 16	Allan Saxe Field • Arlington, TX	**W** 13-0 (5 inn)	**Brown** (4-1)	May (1-5)	None	None		37-7-1	15-1
Apr. 27	at UT Arlington	No. 16	Allan Saxe Field • Arlington, TX	**W** 8-0	**Hamilton** (21-1)	Collins (12-12)	None	None		38-7-1	16-1

May (3-0)
Date	Opponent	Rank	Site/stadium	Score	Win	Loss	Save	TV	Attendance	Overall record	SBC record
May 3	Louisiana-Monroe	No. 13	Lamson Park • Lafayette, LA	**W** 8-6	**Hamilton** (22-1)	Hamby (4-10)	None	None		39-7-1	17-1
May 3	Louisiana-Monroe	No. 13	Lamson Park • Lafayette, LA	**W** 7-0	**Brown** (5-1)	Hamby (4-11)	None	None	1,987	40-7-1	18-1
May 4	Louisiana-Monroe	No. 13	Lamson Park • Lafayette, LA	**W** 9-3	**Wallace** (14-3)	Coyne (4-3)	**Brown** (1)	None	1,120	41-7-1	19-1

Post-Season (8-3)

SBC tournament (3-1)
Date	Opponent	Seed/rank	Site/stadium	Score	Win	Loss	Save	TV	Attendance	Overall record	SBC record
May 8	vs. Western Kentucky (Quarterfinals)	No. 12	Lamson Park • Lafayette, LA	**W** 5-3	**Hamilton** (23-1)	Rousseau (18-17)	None	ESPN3		42-7-1	
May 9	vs. No. 22 South Alabama (Semifinals)	No. 12	Lamson Park • Lafayette, LA	**L** 2-4 (8 inn)	Campbell (17-5)	**Hamilton** (23-2)	None	ESPN3		42-8-1	
May 9	vs. Louisiana-Monroe (Loser's Bracket Championship)	No. 12	Lamson Park • Lafayette, LA	**W** 14-6	**Brown** (6-1)	Coyne (4-4)	None	ESPN3		43-8-1	
May 10	vs. No. 22 South Alabama (Championship)	No. 12	Lamson Park • Lafayette, LA	**W** 4-1	**Hamilton** (24-2)	Beard (21-6)	None	ESPN3		44-8-1	

NCAA tournament (5-2)
Date	Opponent	Seed/rank	Site/stadium	Score	Win	Loss	Save	TV	Attendance	Overall record	SBC record
Lafayette Regionals
May 16	vs. Texas Southern	No. 12	Lamson Park • Lafayette, LA	**W** 7-4	**Hamilton** (25-2)	Staton (11-7)	None	ESPN3	1,945	45-8-1	
May 17	vs. Texas	No. 12	Lamson Park • Lafayette, LA	**W** 3-2	**Hamilton** (26-2)	Davis (19-13)	None	ESPN3		46-8-1	
May 18	vs. Texas	No. 12	Lamson Park • Lafayette, LA	**W** 10-1	**Hamilton** (27-2)	Davis (19-14)	None	ESPN3	2,138	47-8-1	
Lafayette Super Regionals
May 23	vs. No. 10 Arizona	No. 11	Lamson Park • Lafayette, LA	**W** 5-3	**Hamilton** (28-2)	Pinon (19-9)	None	ESPNU	2,691	48-8-1	
May 24	vs. No. 10 Arizona	No. 11	Lamson Park • Lafayette, LA	**W** 7-1	**Hamilton** (29-2)	Babcock (6-1)	None	ESPNU	2,693	49-8-1	
Women's College World Series
May 29	vs. No. 7 Kentucky	No. 11	ASA Hall of Fame Stadium • Oklahoma City, OK	**L** 1-4	Nunley (30-9)	**Hamilton** (29-3)	None	ESPN2		49-9-1	
May 31	vs. No. 4 Oklahoma	No. 11	ASA Hall of Fame Stadium • Oklahoma City, OK	**L** 1-3	Stevens (38-9)	**Hamilton** (29-4)	None	ESPN2	9,192	49-10-1	

Schedule source:

== Lafayette Regional ==
Lafayette Regional Teams
(1) Louisiana–Lafayette Ragin' Cajuns	(2) Texas Longhorns	(3) Mississippi State Bulldogs	(4) Texas Southern Tigers

First Round
6	Louisiana–Lafayette	7
Texas Southern	4
Mississippi State	0
Texas	1
Lower round 1
Texas Southern	3
Mississippi State	5

Semi-Finals
6	Louisiana–Lafayette	3
Texas	2
Lower final
Mississippi State	3
Texas	4

Finals
6	Louisiana–Lafayette	10	–
Texas	2	–

== Lafayette Super Regional ==
Lafayette Super Regional Teams
(1) Louisiana–Lafayette Ragin' Cajuns	(2) Arizona Wildcats

Game 1
Rank	Team	Score
11	Arizona	3
4	Louisiana–Lafayette	5

Game 2
Rank	Team	Score
11	Arizona	1
6	Louisiana–Lafayette	7

== Women's College World Series ==
WCWS Teams
(1) Oregon Ducks	(2) Alabama Crimson Tide	(5) Florida Gators	(6) Louisiana–Lafayette Ragin' Cajuns	(7) Oklahoma Sooners	(8) Florida State Seminoles	(13) Baylor Lady Bears	(14) Kentucky Wildcats

First round
1	Oregon	3
8	Florida State	0
5	Florida	11
13	Baylor	0 ^{5}
8	Florida State	2
13	Baylor	7
14	Kentucky	4
6	Louisiana–Lafayette	1
7	Oklahoma	2
2	Alabama	6
6	Louisiana–Lafayette	1
7	Oklahoma	3

Second round
1	Oregon	0
5	Florida	4
14	Kentucky	7 ^{8}
13	Baylor	8
14	Kentucky	0
2	Alabama	2
1	Oregon	4
7	Oklahoma	2

Semifinals
5	Florida	6	X
13	Baylor	3	X
2	Alabama	2	X
1	Oregon	0	X

Finals
5	Florida	5	6	X
2	Alabama	0	3	X
