= 2009 Louisiana–Lafayette Ragin' Cajuns softball team =

American college softball season

2009 Louisiana–Lafayette Ragin' Cajuns softball

Waco Regionals Appearance

Sun Belt Conference tournament champions Sun Belt Conference regular-season champions
- Conference: Sun Belt Conference

Ranking
- Coaches: No. 25
- Record: 45–13 (18–5 SBC)
- Head coach: Michael Lotief (9th season); Stefni Lotief (10th season)
- Assistant coach: Chris Malveaux
- Home stadium: Alfred and Helen Lamson Ragin' Cajuns Softball Park

2009 Sun Belt Conference softball standings
	Conf.				Overall
Team	W		L	PCT	W		L	PCT
No. 25 Louisiana–Lafayette ‍†‍‡‍^{y}	18	–	5	.783	45	–	13	.776
Troy ‍‍‍	15	–	8	.652	38	–	19	.667
Western Kentucky ‍‍‍	14	–	9	.609	35	–	19	.648
FIU ‍‍‍	13	–	11	.542	31	–	29	.517
North Texas ‍‍‍	11	–	12	.478	26	–	28	.481
South Alabama ‍‍‍	10	–	12	.455	27	–	28	.491
Florida Atlantic ‍‍‍	10	–	13	.435	30	–	30	.500
Louisiana–Monroe ‍‍‍	7	–	15	.318	17	–	35	.327
Middle Tennessee ‍‍‍	5	–	18	.217	14	–	34	.292
† – Conference champion ‡ – Tournament champion y – Invited to the NCAA tournament As of June 2009; Rankings from

The 2009 Louisiana–Lafayette Ragin' Cajuns softball team represented the University of Louisiana at Lafayette in the 2009 NCAA Division I softball season. The Ragin' Cajuns played their home games at Lamson Park and were led by ninth and tenth year husband and wife head coaching duo Michael and Stefni Lotief, respectively.

== Roster ==
2009 Louisiana–Lafayette Ragin' Cajuns roster
Pitchers: 00 Ashley Brignac – Sophomore; 5 Shari Sigur – Junior; 10 Brittany Cuevas – Junior; 18 Amanda Hill – Junior; 21 Donna Bourgeois – Sophomore; Utility Players: 3 Ashley Ray – Redshirt Freshman; 7 Natalie Travasos – Junior; 8 Monique Prejean – Sophomore; 12 Christi Orgeron – Redshirt Freshman; 17 Callie Philen – Redshirt Freshman; 23 Kalyn Harris – Redshirt Freshman; Catchers: 6 Lana Bowers – Junior	Infielders: 4 Kelly Cormier – Sophomore; 8 Heidi Pizer – Redshirt Freshman; 15 Nikki Goff – Redshirt Freshman; 16 Melissa Verde – Junior; 19 Courtney Trahan – Junior; 22 Laura Anne Hagle – Redshirt Freshman; 24 Codi Runyan – Senior; 25 Gabriele Bridges – Sophomore; 27 Jessica Dupont – Sophomore; 29 Megan Granger – Sophomore; 31 Paige Cormier – Redshirt Freshman; Outfielders: 9 Karli Hubbard – Senior; 13 Erikka Murphy – Redshirt Freshman; 14 Vallie Gaspard – Junior; 17 Montana Patin – Senior; 20 Katie Smith – Sophomore; 30 Katey Stanford – Redshirt Freshman

=== Coaching staff ===
2009 Louisiana–Lafayette Ragin' Cajuns coaching staff
- Michael Lotief – Co-Head Coach – 9th year
- Stefni Lotief – Co-Head Coach – 10th year
- Chris Malveaux - Assistant coach - 1st year

== Schedule and results ==
Legend
	Louisiana–Lafayette win
	Louisiana–Lafayette loss
	Postponement
**Bold**	Louisiana–Lafayette team member

2009 Louisiana–Lafayette Ragin' Cajuns Softball Game Log
Regular season (38–10)

February (10–2)
Date	Opponent	Ranking	Site/stadium	Score	TV	Overall record	SBC record
Feb. 6	Ole Miss		Alfred and Helen Lamson Ragin' Cajuns Softball Park • Lafayette, LA	**W** 7–0		1–0	
Feb. 7	Ole Miss		Alfred and Helen Lamson Ragin' Cajuns Softball Park • Lafayette, LA	**L** 2–4		1–1	
Feb. 8	Ole Miss		Alfred and Helen Lamson Ragin' Cajuns Softball Park • Lafayette, LA	**L** 0–4		1–2	
Louisiana Classics
Feb. 13	vs. Lispcomb		Alfred and Helen Lamson Ragin' Cajuns Softball Park • Lafayette, LA	**W** 4–2		2–2	
Feb. 14	vs. Louisiana Tech		Alfred and Helen Lamson Ragin' Cajuns Softball Park • Lafayette, LA	**W** 11–0		3–2	
Feb. 14	vs. Providence		Alfred and Helen Lamson Ragin' Cajuns Softball Park • Lafayette, LA	**W** 13–2		4–2	
Feb. 15	vs. Nicholls State		Alfred and Helen Lamson Ragin' Cajuns Softball Park • Lafayette, LA	**W** 5–1		5–2	
Feb. 15	vs. McNeese State		Alfred and Helen Lamson Ragin' Cajuns Softball Park • Lafayette, LA	**W** 11–0		6–2	
Mardi Gras Invitational
Feb. 20	vs. UConn	No. 20	Alfred and Helen Lamson Ragin' Cajuns Softball Park • Lafayette, LA	**W** 9–4		7–2	
Feb. 20	vs. Kentucky	No. 20	Alfred and Helen Lamson Ragin' Cajuns Softball Park • Lafayette, LA	**W** 5–2		8–2	
Feb. 21	vs. San Diego State	No. 20	Alfred and Helen Lamson Ragin' Cajuns Softball Park • Lafayette, LA	**W** 1–0		9–2	
Feb. 21	vs. Kentucky	No. 20	Alfred and Helen Lamson Ragin' Cajuns Softball Park • Lafayette, LA	Game canceled			
Feb. 22	vs. San Diego State	No. 20	Alfred and Helen Lamson Ragin' Cajuns Softball Park • Lafayette, LA	**W** 5–0		10–2	
NFCA Leadoff Classic
Feb. 27	vs. Georgia Tech		South Commons Softball Complex • Columbus, GA	Game canceled			
Feb. 27	vs. Northwestern		South Commons Softball Complex • Columbus, GA	Game canceled			
Feb. 28	vs. DePaul		South Commons Softball Complex • Columbus, GA	Game canceled			
Feb. 28	vs. Michigan		South Commons Softball Complex • Columbus, GA	Game canceled			

March (10–5)
Date	Opponent	Ranking	Site/stadium	Score	TV	Overall record	SBC record
NFCA Leadoff Classic
Mar. 1	vs. Florida State		South Commons Softball Complex • Columbus, GA	Game canceled			
Mar. 4	Southern Miss		Alfred and Helen Lamson Ragin' Cajuns Softball Park • Lafayette, LA	**W** 5–0		11–2	
Mar. 10	Louisiana Tech		Alfred and Helen Lamson Ragin' Cajuns Softball Park • Lafayette, LA	**W** 8–0		12–2	
Mar. 10	Louisiana Tech		Alfred and Helen Lamson Ragin' Cajuns Softball Park • Lafayette, LA	**W** 3–2		13–2	
Judi Garman Classic
Mar. 12	vs. Nebraska	No. 16	Anderson Family Field • Fullerton, CA	**L** 0–2		13–3	
Mar. 13	vs. No. 10 Michigan	No. 16	Anderson Family Field • Fullerton, CA	**L** 1–9		13–4	
Mar. 13	vs. No. 24 Fresno State	No. 16	Anderson Family Field • Fullerton, CA	**W** 7–0		14–4	
Mar. 14	vs. No. 9 Oklahoma	No. 16	Anderson Family Field • Fullerton, CA	**L** 5–8		14–5	
Mar. 15	vs. New Mexico	No. 16	Anderson Family Field • Fullerton, CA	**W** 9–0		15–5	
Mar. 17	Tulsa		Alfred and Helen Lamson Ragin' Cajuns Softball Park • Lafayette, LA	**W** 6–0		16–5	
Mar. 21	Western Kentucky		Alfred and Helen Lamson Ragin' Cajuns Softball Park • Lafayette, LA	**L** 0–1		16–6	0–1
Mar. 21	Western Kentucky		Alfred and Helen Lamson Ragin' Cajuns Softball Park • Lafayette, LA	**W** 6–3		17–6	1–1
Mar. 22	Western Kentucky		Alfred and Helen Lamson Ragin' Cajuns Softball Park • Lafayette, LA	**L** 0–1		17–7	1–2
Mar. 28	at McNeese State	No. 21	Joe Miller Field at Cowgirl Diamond • Lake Charles, LA	**W** 10–0		18–7	
Mar. 31	Middle Tennessee	No. 20	Alfred and Helen Lamson Ragin' Cajuns Softball Park • Lafayette, LA	**W** 7–0		19–7	2–2
Mar. 28	Middle Tennessee	No. 20	Alfred and Helen Lamson Ragin' Cajuns Softball Park • Lafayette, LA	**W** 11–3		20–7	3–2

April (16–3)
Date	Opponent	Ranking	Site/stadium	Score	TV	Overall record	SBC record
Apr. 1	Middle Tennessee	No. 20	Alfred and Helen Lamson Ragin' Cajuns Softball Park • Lafayette, LA	**W** 12–0		21–7	4–2
Apr. 4	FIU	No. 20	Alfred and Helen Lamson Ragin' Cajuns Softball Park • Lafayette, LA	**W** 9–0	CST	22–7	5–2
Apr. 4	FIU	No. 20	Alfred and Helen Lamson Ragin' Cajuns Softball Park • Lafayette, LA	**W** 8–0		23–7	6–2
Apr. 5	FIU		Alfred and Helen Lamson Ragin' Cajuns Softball Park • Lafayette, LA	**L** 2–3		23–8	6–3
Apr. 7	McNeese State	No. 19	Alfred and Helen Lamson Ragin' Cajuns Softball Park • Lafayette, LA	**W** 8–0		24–8	
Apr. 10	at South Alabama	No. 19	Jaguar Field • Mobile, AL	**L** 1–3		24–9	6–4
Apr. 10	at South Alabama	No. 19	Jaguar Field • Mobile, AL	**L** 1–3		24–10	6–5
Apr. 11	at South Alabama	No. 19	Jaguar Field • Mobile, AL	**W** 3–0		25–10	7–5
Apr. 14	at Florida Atlantic		FAU Softball Stadium • Boca Raton, FL	**W** 8–0		26–10	8–5
Apr. 14	at Florida Atlantic		FAU Softball Stadium • Boca Raton, FL	**W** 1–0		27–10	9–5
Apr. 15	at Florida Atlantic		FAU Softball Stadium • Boca Raton, FL	**W** 2–0		28–10	10–5
Apr. 18	Troy		Alfred and Helen Lamson Ragin' Cajuns Softball Park • Lafayette, LA	**W** 4–2		29–10	11–5
Apr. 18	Troy		Alfred and Helen Lamson Ragin' Cajuns Softball Park • Lafayette, LA	**W** 9–1		30–10	12–5
Apr. 19	Troy		Alfred and Helen Lamson Ragin' Cajuns Softball Park • Lafayette, LA	**W** 4–3		31–10	13–5
Apr. 21	Grambling State	No. 23	Alfred and Helen Lamson Ragin' Cajuns Softball Park • Lafayette, LA	**W** 7–0		32–10	14–5
Apr. 25	at North Texas	No. 23	Lovelace Softball Stadium • Denton, TX	**W** 10–0		33–10	15–5
Apr. 25	at North Texas	No. 23	Lovelace Softball Stadium • Denton, TX	**W** 11–2		34–10	16–5
Apr. 26	at North Texas	No. 23	Lovelace Softball Stadium • Denton, TX	**W** 12–3		35–10	17–5
Apr. 28	Houston		Alfred and Helen Lamson Ragin' Cajuns Softball Park • Lafayette, LA	**W** 4–3		36–10	18–5

May (2–0)
Date	Opponent	Ranking	Site/stadium	Score	TV	Overall record	SBC record
May 2	at Louisiana–Monroe		Warhawk Field • Monroe, LA	**W** 9–1		37–10	15–4
May 2	at Louisiana–Monroe		Warhawk Field • Monroe, LA	**W** 8–0		38–10	16–4
May 3	at Louisiana–Monroe		Warhawk Field • Monroe, LA	Game canceled			

Post-Season (7–3)

SBC tournament (5–1)
Date	Opponent	Ranking	Site/stadium	Score	TV	Overall record	SBC record
May 6	vs. Louisiana–Monroe		Lovelace Softball Stadium • Denton, TX	**L** 0–1		38–11	
May 7	vs. North Texas		Lovelace Softball Stadium • Denton, TX	**W** 8–3		39–11	
May 8	vs. Louisiana–Monroe		Lovelace Softball Stadium • Denton, TX	**W** 9–1		40–11	
May 8	vs. FIU		Lovelace Softball Stadium • Denton, TX	**W** 3–0		41–11	
May 9	vs. FIU		Lovelace Softball Stadium • Denton, TX	**W** 8–0		42–11	
May 8	vs. Florida Atlantic		Lovelace Softball Stadium • Denton, TX	**W** 8–3		43–11	

NCAA Division I Softball Championship (2–2)
Date	Opponent	Ranking	Site/stadium	Score	TV	Overall record	SBC record
Waco Regionals
May 15	vs. Baylor		Getterman Stadium • Waco, TX	**L** 1–2		43–12	
May 16	vs. Northwestern		Getterman Stadium • Waco, TX	**W** 3–2		44–12	
May 17	vs. Texas State		Getterman Stadium • Waco, TX	**W** 5–0		45–12	
May 17	vs. Baylor		Getterman Stadium • Waco, TX	**L** 1–6		45–13	

Schedule source:

== Waco Regional ==
Waco Regional Teams
(1) Northwestern Wildcats	(2) Baylor Lady Bears	(3) Louisiana–Lafayette Ragin' Cajuns	(4) Texas State Bobcats

First Round
12	Northwestern State	0
Texas State	8
Louisiana–Lafayette	1
Baylor	2
Lower round 1
12	Northwestern	2
Louisiana–Lafayette	3

Semi-Finals
Texas State	4
Baylor	7
Lower final
Texas State	0
Louisiana–Lafayette	5

Finals
Baylor	6	–
Louisiana–Lafayette	1	–
