= Molly Fichtner =

American softball coach and player

Current position
- Title: Head coach
- Team: Louisiana–Monroe
- Conference: Sun Belt
- Record: 93–146 (.389)

Biographical details
- Born: 1992 (age 33–34); Houston, Texas, U.S.

Playing career
- 2011–2012: UTSA
- 2013–2014: Alabama
- Position: Catcher

Coaching career (HC unless noted)
- 2015: Alabama (GA)
- 2016–2017: Dartmouth (asst.)
- 2018: East Carolina (asst.)
- 2019–present: Louisiana–Monroe

Head coaching record
- Overall: 93–146 (.389)

Molly Fichtner (born 1992) is an American softball coach and former player. She is currently the head coach at Louisiana–Monroe.

== Career ==
She attended Clear Brook High School in Houston, Texas. She later attended the University of Texas at San Antonio for two years, before transferring to the University of Alabama, where she played catcher for the Alabama Crimson Tide softball team. Fichtner was diagnosed with type 1 diabetes at age 12, and played four years of NCAA Division I college softball with the condition. During her senior season in 2014, Fichtner led the Crimson Tide to the 2014 Women's College World Series finals, where they fell to Florida, 2–0.

== Coaching career ==
After graduating from Alabama, Fichtner later went on to serve as an assistant softball coach at the University of Alabama, Dartmouth College, and East Carolina University.

On September 21, 2018, Fichtner was named head softball coach at Louisiana–Monroe.

== Head coaching record ==
Record table
Season	Team	Overall	Conference	Standing	Postseason
Louisiana–Monroe Warhawks (Sun Belt Conference) (2019–present)
2019	Louisiana–Monroe	14–41	7–17	8th	
2020	Louisiana–Monroe	10–14	1–2	9th	Season canceled due to COVID-19
2021	Louisiana–Monroe	17–32	6–15	9th	
2022	Louisiana–Monroe	27–27	10–17	8th	
2023	Louisiana–Monroe	25–32	7–17	8th	
2024	Louisiana–Monroe	31–24	12–12	6th	
2025	Louisiana–Monroe	35–22	14–10	4th	
Louisiana–Monroe:		93–146 (.389)	31–68 (.313)		
Total:		93–146 (.389)			
National champion Postseason invitational champion Conference regular season champion Conference regular season and conference tournament champion Division regular season champion Division regular season and conference tournament champion Conference tournament champion
