= Louisiana Ragin' Cajuns softball =

- 2026 Louisiana Ragin' Cajuns softball team
- Founded: 1981 (44 years ago )
- University: University of Louisiana at Lafayette
- Head coach: Alyson Habetz (2nd season)
- Conference: Sun Belt
- Location: Lafayette, Louisiana, US
- Home stadium: Yvette Girouard Field at Lamson Park (capacity: 2,790)
- Nickname: Ragin' Cajuns
- Colors: Vermilion and white

NCAA WCWS appearances
- 1993, 1995, 1996, 2003, 2008, 2014

NCAA super regional appearances
- 2008, 2010, 2012, 2013, 2014, 2015, 2016, 2023

NCAA Tournament appearances
- 1990, 1991, 1992, 1993, 1994, 1995, 1996, 1997, 1999, 2000, 2001, 2002, 2003, 2004, 2005, 2006, 2007, 2008, 2009, 2010, 2011, 2012, 2013, 2014, 2015, 2016, 2017, 2018, 2019, 2021, 2022, 2023, 2024

Conference tournament championships
- Southland; 1984, 1987 Sun Belt; 2000, 2001, 2002, 2003, 2004, 2005, 2006, 2008, 2009, 2010, 2011, 2014, 2016, 2017, 2019, 2021, 2022, 2023

Regular-season conference championships
- Louisiana AIAW; 1982 Southland; 1984, 1987 Sun Belt; 2000, 2001, 2002, 2003, 2004, 2005, 2006, 2008, 2009, 2010, 2011, 2012, 2014, 2015, 2016, 2017, 2018, 2019, 2021, 2022, 2023, 2024

The Louisiana Ragin' Cajuns softball team represents the University of Louisiana at Lafayette in NCAA Division I college softball. The team participates in the Sun Belt Conference. The Ragin' Cajuns were most recently led by head coach Gerry Glasco. Yvette Girouard was head coach from 1981 to 2000 leading the Ragin' Cajuns to 10 NCAA tournaments and three Women's College World Series appearances. The team plays its home games at Yvette Girouard Field at Lamson Park located on the university's athletic campus.

== NCAA Regional appearances ==
NCAA Regional Results
1990 Regional No. 8 at Lafayette, LA

Defeated Texas A&M, 1–0
Lost to Florida State, 3–4
Lost to Florida State, 1–2
First time in NCAA Tournament and hosting one of the eight regionals

1991 Regional No. 1 at Lafayette, LA

Lost to Florida State, 0–1
Lost to Oklahoma State, 2–3

1992 Regional No. 8 at Lafayette, LA

Lost to Florida State, 0–1
Defeated UNLV, 1–0
Lost to Florida State, 0–1

1993 Regional No. 8 at Ann Arbor, MI

Defeated Bowling Green, 7–3
Defeated Michigan, 6–5
Defeated Michigan, 2–1

1994 Regional No. 4 at Lafayette, LA

Defeated McNeese State, 3–0
Defeated Utah, 1–0
Lost to Utah, 3–2
Lost to Utah, 0–2

1995 Regional No. 5 at Lafayette, LA

Defeated Nicholls State, 5–1
Defeated Washington, 7–6
Defeated Washington, 3–1

1996 Regional No. 4 at Lafayette, LA

Defeated Nicholls State, 1–0
Defeated Nebraska, 9–4
Defeated Nicholls State, 2–1

1997 Regional No. 5 at Lafayette, LA

Defeated Northeast Louisiana, 2–1
Defeated UCLA, 4–1
Lost to UCLA, 0–9
Lost to UCLA, 0–3

1999 Regional No. 7 at Amherst, MA

Defeated Manhattan, 15–0
Defeated Hofstra, 5–1
Defeated California, 2–1
Lost to California, 0–3
Lost to California, 3–8

2000 Regional No. 7 at Baton Rouge, LA

Lost to Hofstra, 1–2
Defeated LSU, 4–1
Lost to Oregon, 3–4

2001 Regional No. 3 at Baton Rouge, LA

Defeated Southern Miss, 5–1
Lost to Arizona State, 1–2
Defeated Arizona State, 5–0
Lost to LSU, 1–2

2002 Regional No. 3 at Lafayette, LA

Lost to UMass, 3–5
Defeated Mississippi State, 10–3
Lost to LSU, 2–5

2003 Regional No. 6 at Fullerton, CA

Defeated San Diego State, 6–0
Defeated Cal State Fullerton, 1–0
Defeated Oklahoma State, 1–0
Lost to Oregon, 2–9
Defeated Oregon, 6–4

2004 Regional No. 1 at Tucson, AZ

Defeated South Carolina, 1–0
Lost to Arizona, 0–4
Defeated Temple, 8–1
Defeated Northwestern, 3–0
Defeated Arizona, 5–0
Defeated Oklahoma, 12–4
Lost to Oklahoma, 0–15

2005 Norman, OK Regional

Defeated Oregon, 7–5
Lost to Oklahoma, 3–6
Lost to Oregon, 1–3

2006 Baton Rouge, LA Regional

Defeated North Carolina State, 2–0
Lost to LSU, 6–7
Defeated North Carolina State, 4–3
Lost to LSU, 4–5

2007 College Station, TX Regional

Lost to Houston, 3–4
Lost to Sam Houston State, 1–2

2008 Baton Rouge, LA Regional

Defeated East Carolina, 2–1
Defeated LSU, 9–4
Defeated LSU, 6–3

2009 Waco, TX Regional

Lost to Baylor, 1–2
Defeated Northwestern, 3–2
Defeated Texas State, 5–0
Lost to Baylor, 1–6

2010 Baton Rouge, LA Regional

Defeated Texas A&M, 5–0
Defeated LSU, 1–0
Defeated Texas A&M, 6–1

2011 Austin, TX Regional

Lost to Houston, 2–7
Defeated Texas State, 11–2
Defeated Texas, 5–3
Lost to Houston, 1–4

2012 Lafayette, LA Regional

Defeated Mississippi Valley State, 8–0
Defeated Stanford, 9–3
Defeated Stanford, 6–2

2013 Baton Rouge, LA Regional

Defeated Northwestern State, 3–0
Defeated LSU, 3–0
Defeated LSU, 1–0

2014 Lafayette, LA Regional

Defeated Texas Southern, 7–4
Defeated Texas, 3–2
Defeated Texas, 10–2

2015 Lafayette, LA Regional

Defeated Weber State, 11–0
Defeated Baylor, 3–1
Lost to Baylor, 2–6
Defeated Baylor, 9–1

2016 Lafayette, LA Regional

Defeated Boston University, 9–5
Defeated Texas, 9–1
Defeated Texas A&M, 9–8

2017 Baton Rouge, LA Regional

Defeated McNeese State, 6–0
Defeated LSU, 4–2
Lost to LSU, 1–6
Lost to LSU, 1–5

2018 Baton Rouge, LA Regional

Lost to Houston, 0–1
Defeated Fordham, 15–3
Defeated Houston, 7–2
Defeated LSU, 5–4
Lost to LSU, 1–3

2019 Oxford, MS Regional

Defeated Southeast Missouri State, 3–2
Defeated Ole Miss, 2–0
Lost to Ole Miss, 1–5
Lost to Ole Miss, 4–5

2021 Baton Rouge, LA Regional

Defeated George Washington, 1–0
Lost to LSU, 3–10
Defeated McNeese State, 4–0
Defeated LSU, 2–0
Lost to LSU, 5–8

2022 Clemson, SC Regional

Lost to Auburn, 3–4
Defeated UNC Wilmington, 3–1
Defeated Auburn, 4–3
Lost to Clemson, 0–8

2023 Baton Rouge, LA Regional

Defeated Omaha, 5–0
Lost to LSU, 0–4
Defeated Omaha, 9–0
Defeated LSU, 7–4
Defeated LSU, 9–8

2024 Lafayette, LA Regional

Defeated Princeton, 8–0
Lost to Baylor, 0–8
Defeated Princeton, 2–1
Defeated Baylor, 13–0
Lost to Baylor, 3–4

== NCAA Super Regional appearances ==
NCAA Super Regional Results
2008 Houston, TX Super Regional

Defeated Houston, 6–4
Lost to Houston, 3–6
Defeated Houston, 4–0

2010 Los Angeles, CA Super Regional

Lost to UCLA, 2–10
Lost to UCLA, 1–10

2012 Tempe, AZ Super Regional

Defeated Arizona State, 6–0
Lost to Arizona State, 2–9
Lost to Arizona State, 0–8

2013 Ann Arbor, MI Super Regional

Lost to Michigan, 3–4
Defeated Michigan, 5–0
Lost to Michigan, 1–2

2014 Lafayette, LA Super Regional

Defeated Arizona, 5–3
Defeated Arizona, 7–1

2015 Auburn, AL Super Regional

Lost to Auburn, 11–12
Lost to Auburn, 3–6

2016 Norman, OK Super Regional

Lost to Oklahoma, 2–8
Lost to Oklahoma, 6–7

2023 Seattle, WA Super Regional

Lost to Washington, 0–8
Lost to Washington, 0–2

== NCAA College World Series appearances ==
NCAA College World Series Results
1993 Women's College World Series at ASA Hall of Fame Stadium in Oklahoma City, OK

Defeated Cal State Northridge, 4–2
Lost to Arizona, 1–2
Defeated Connecticut, 1–0
Defeated Arizona, 1–0
Lost to UCLA, 0–1

1995 Women's College World Series at ASA Hall of Fame Stadium in Oklahoma City, OK

Defeated Michigan, 5–0
Lost to UCLA, 0–3
Lost to UNLV, 1–5

1995 Women's College World Series at Golden Park in Columbus, GA

Defeated Michigan, 5–0
Lost to UCLA, 0–3
Lost to UNLV, 1–5

2003 Women's College World Series at ASA Hall of Fame Stadium in Oklahoma City, OK

Lost to Texas, 2–3
Lost to UCLA, 1–5

2008 Women's College World Series at ASA Hall of Fame Stadium in Oklahoma City, OK

Defeated Florida, 3–2
Lost to Texas A&M, 1–2
Lost to Alabama, 1–3

2014 Women's College World Series at ASA Hall of Fame Stadium in Oklahoma City, OK

Lost to Kentucky, 1–4
Lost to Oklahoma, 1–3

== Year-by-year results ==
Record table
Season	Coach	Overall	Conference	Standing	Postseason
Southwestern Louisiana Lady Cajuns (AIAW) (1981–1982)
1981	Yvette Girouard	6–14			
1982	Yvette Girouard	15–13			
AIAW:		21–27			
Southwestern Louisiana Lady Cajuns (Southland Conference) (1983–1987)
1983	Yvette Girouard	22–13	6–2	1st (South)	
1984	Yvette Girouard	28–9	6–2	1st (South)	
1985	Yvette Girouard	39–13	12–0	1st	
1986	Yvette Girouard	32–19	10–2	1st	
1987	Yvette Girouard	31–18	10–2	1st	
Southland:		152–72	44–8		
Southwestern Louisiana Lady Cajuns (Independents) (1988–1999)
1988	Yvette Girouard	29–16			
1989	Yvette Girouard	48–16			
1990	Yvette Girouard	44–8			NCAA Regionals
1991	Yvette Girouard	33–10			NCAA Regionals
1992	Yvette Girouard	41–12			NCAA Regionals
1993	Yvette Girouard	57–7			NCAA WCWS
1994	Yvette Girouard	57–5			NCAA Regionals
1995	Yvette Girouard	49–9			NCAA WCWS
1996	Yvette Girouard	46–10			NCAA WCWS
1997	Yvette Girouard	46–18			NCAA Regionals
1998	Yvette Girouard	36–15			
1999	Yvette Girouard	54–11			NCAA Regionals
Independent:		540–137			
Louisiana–Lafayette Lady Cajuns (Sun Belt Conference) (2000–2002)
2000	Yvette Girouard	45–15	0–0	1st	NCAA Regionals
2001	Stefni Lotief	51–10	19–1	1st	NCAA Regionals
2002	Stefni & Michael Lotief	50–13	15–1	1st	NCAA Regionals
Louisiana–Lafayette Ragin' Cajuns (Sun Belt Conference) (2003–2017)
2003	Stefni & Michael Lotief	47–11	13–3	1st	NCAA WCWS
2004	Stefni & Michael Lotief	60–8	18–0	1st	NCAA Regionals
2005	Stefni & Michael Lotief	51–10	19–1	1st	NCAA Regionals
2006	Stefni & Michael Lotief	50–12	12–3	1st	NCAA Regionals
2007	Stefni & Michael Lotief	46–18	15–8	2nd	NCAA Regionals
2008	Stefni & Michael Lotief	52–15	19–3	1st	NCAA WCWS
2009	Stefni & Michael Lotief	45–13	18–5	1st	NCAA Regionals
2010	Stefni & Michael Lotief	45–18	19–5	1st	NCAA Super Regionals
2011	Stefni & Michael Lotief	51–11	19–5	1st	NCAA Regionals
2012	Stefni & Michael Lotief	53–6	21–3	1st	NCAA Super Regionals
2013	Michael Lotief; Megan Grainer (Feb. interim)	47–15	19–4	3rd	NCAA Super Regionals
2014	Michael Lotief	49–10	19–1	1st	NCAA WCWS
2015	Michael Lotief	42–12	20–3	1st	NCAA Super Regionals
2016	Michael Lotief	46–9	21–2	1st	NCAA Super Regionals
2017	Michael Lotief	47–8	23–1	1st	NCAA Regional
2018	Gerry Glasco	41–16	21–6	1st	NCAA Regionals
2019	Gerry Glasco	52–6	25–0	1st	NCAA Regionals
2020	Gerry Glasco	18–6	2–1	No conference season	Season canceled due to the COVID-19 pandemic
2021	Gerry Glasco	47–12	21–3	1st	NCAA Regionals
2022	Gerry Glasco	47–13	23–4	1st	NCAA Regionals
2023	Gerry Glasco	45–19	22–2	1st	NCAA Regionals
2024	Gerry Glasco	50–16	22–2	1st	NCAA Regionals
2025	Alyson Habetz	23–23	9–9		
Sun Belt:		1,205–322	454–76		
Total:		1,918–558			
National champion Postseason invitational champion Conference regular season champion Conference regular season and conference tournament champion Division regular season champion Division regular season and conference tournament champion Conference tournament champion

== Head coaches ==
Head coaches
Years Coached	Name	Wins	Losses	Ties
1981–2000	Yvette Girouard	759	200	0
2001–2012	Stefni Lotief	601	145	0
2002–2017	Michael Lotief	834	195	1
2018–2024	Gerry Glasco	300	88	0
2025–present	Alyson Habetz	23	23	0

== Awards and honors ==
=== National awards ===
NFCA Catcher of the Year

- Lexie Elkins (2015, 2016)

NFCA Golden Shoe Award

- Mihyia Davis (2023)

== Record against Sun Belt ==
Opponent	Won	Lost	Tied	Pct.	Last Played
Appalachian State	19	2	0	.905	2025
Arkansas State	6	0	0	1.000	1987
Coastal Carolina	26	5	0	.839	2025
Georgia Southern	20	3	0	.870	2022
Georgia State	33	4	0	.892	2022
James Madison	9	3	0	.750	2025
Louisiana–Monroe	124	29	0	.810	2025
Marshall	2	2	0	.500	2025
South Alabama	51	11	0	.823	2025
Southern Miss	54	5	0	.915	2025
Texas State	53	11	0	.828	2025
Troy	52	10	0	.839	2025

- Last updated at the conclusion of the 2025 conference tournament.
- Includes records prior to SBC play
- Old Dominion does not field a softball team in the NCAA

== See also ==
- List of NCAA Division I softball programs
