= Yvette Girouard Field at Lamson Park =

Softball park in Lafayette, Louisiana, US

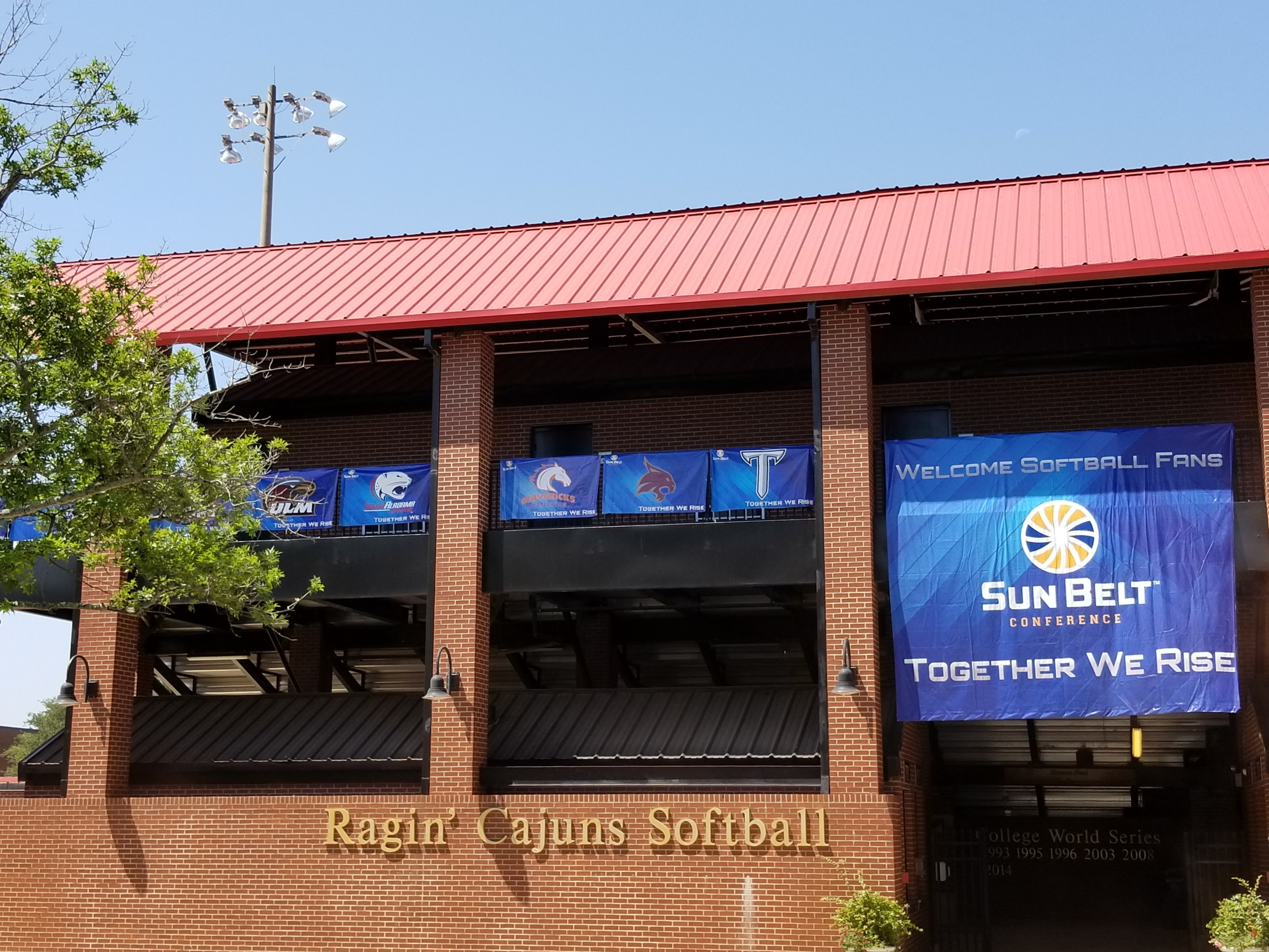
- Lamson Park
- Interactive map of Yvette Girouard Field at Lamson Park
- Former names: Lady Cajuns Park (1985-2003); Ragin Cajuns Park (2003-2006); Lamson Park (2006-2019)
- Location: 235 Cajundome Blvd; Lafayette, Louisiana 70506 United States
- Coordinates: 30.213474°N 92.036964°W
- Owner: University of Louisiana at Lafayette
- Operator: UL Athletics Department
- Capacity: 2,790
- Surface: Artificial turf
- Record attendance: 3,107
- Field size: L - 200, C - 220, R - 200
- Acreage: 2.97

Construction
- Groundbreaking: 1984
- Opened: 1985
- Renovated: 1992, 1994, 1995, 2002, 2006, 2009-11, 2016, 2019, 2020

Tenant
- Louisiana Ragin' Cajuns softball (NCAA)

Yvette Girouard Field at Lamson Park is a ballpark located on the South Campus of the University of Louisiana at Lafayette in Lafayette, Louisiana. Originally built in 1985, Lamson Park is the home of the University of Louisiana at Lafayette's Ragin' Cajuns softball program. When Lady Cajun's Park was built, the Softball program had no budget, no money, and no stable foundation. Now, Cajuns softball is known as a national powerhouse, year after year, and Lamson Park continues to grow.

The stadium went through a $2.1 million renovation from 2009 to 2011, which included a mostly-covered grandstand between dugouts, three private luxury suites, and a 50-seat Stadium Club. Additional seating was also added beyond the outfield fence, bringing it to its current capacity of 2,790.

The 2011 renovations also included a new and larger press box with three broadcast booths, a larger and more functional locker room, a technology-driven meeting room and a new scoreboard in right field that debuted in 2010. The video board from 2010 was replaced in February 2020, with a new 30-ft screen.

Finally, a state-of-the-art indoor hitting facility was completed in 2016. The structure is located in the left field corner and includes a total of 12 cages, which are mounted on zip lines so that they can be retracted to open up the facility for infield drills and/or pitching instruction.

In 2019, a new artificial field turf was installed by GeoSurfaces at the commencement of the season.

Lamson Park routinely ranks in the top-ten nationally both in attendance, as well as atmosphere. A new attendance record was established on February 15, 2020, with 3,107 in attendance to watch UL defeat LSU by a score of 2–1. The game also marked the 100th win for Coach Glasco.

In terms of official seating capacity, Lamson Park is the largest softball stadium in the Sun Belt Conference and in Louisiana. In terms of overall stadium size and area it is smaller than others in Louisiana.

== Names ==
- First known as Lady Cajun Park, it was changed in 2002 to Ragin' Cajuns Softball Park.
- In 2006, the name was changed to Lamson Park, in honor of long-time UL supporters Alfred and Helen Lamson.
- In March 2019, the name was modified to honor the legacy of its first coach, Yvette Girouard, becoming "Yvette Girouard Field at Lamson Park."

Ms. Girouard founded the program in 1981, going on to secure a 759–250 record during her tenure as head coach, which lasted from 1982 to 2000. She also had 19 consecutive winning seasons.

== Events hosted ==
Since its inception, Lamson Park has hosted numerous major postseason events, including:

- 1990 NCAA Regionals
- 1991 NCAA Regionals
- 1992 NCAA Regionals
- 1994 NCAA Regionals
- 1995 NCAA Regionals
- 1996 NCAA Regionals
- 1997 NCAA Regionals
- 2000 Sun Belt Conference Tournament
- 2002 NCAA Regionals
- 2004 NCAA Sun Belt Conference Tournament
- 2011 Sun Belt Conference Tournament
- 2012 NCAA Regionals
- 2014 Sun Belt Conference Tournament, NCAA Regionals, and NCAA Super Regionals
- 2015 NCAA Regionals
- 2016 NCAA Regionals
- 2018 Sun Belt Conference Tournament
- 2024 NCAA Regionals

== Gallery ==
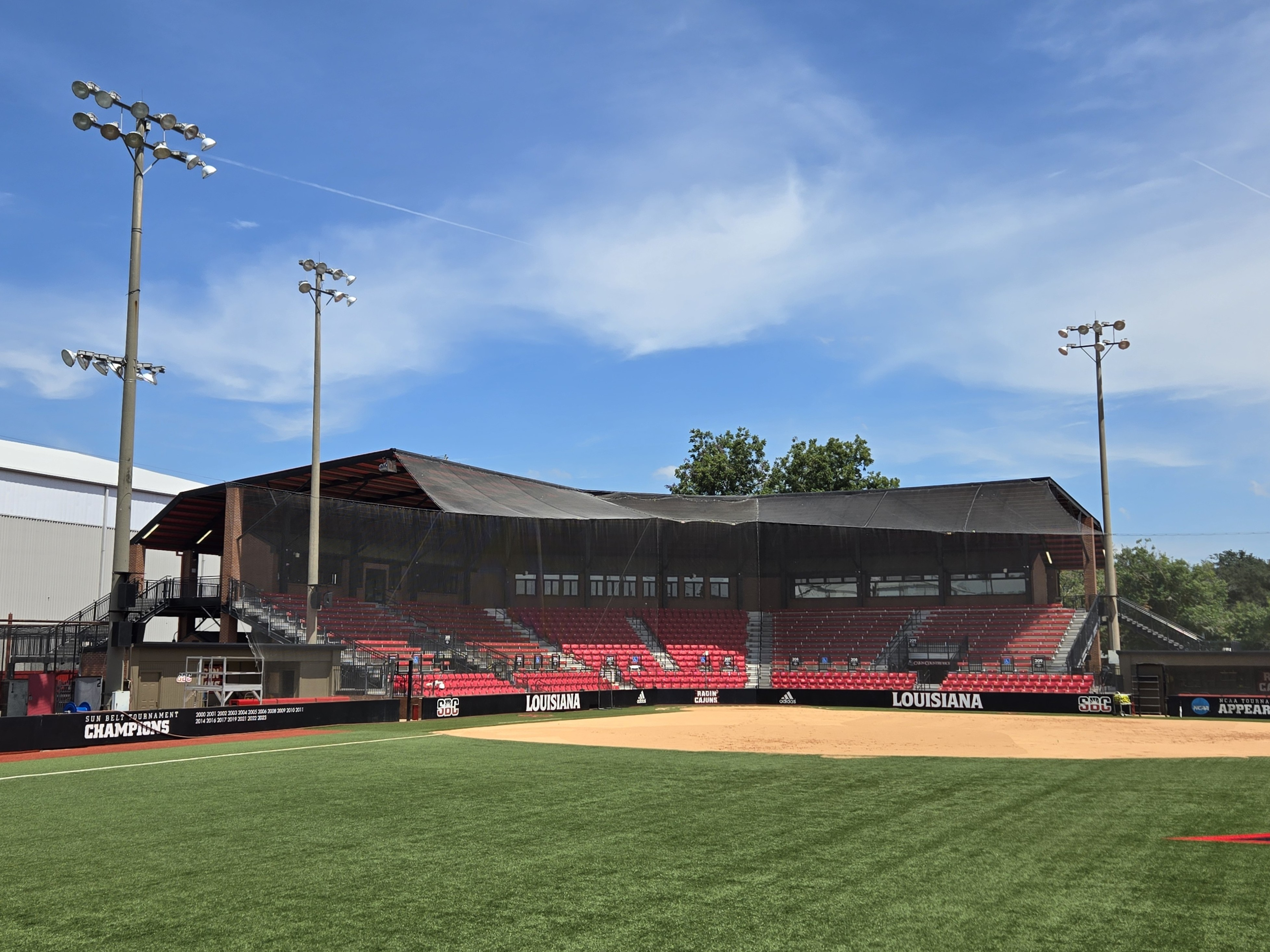
Yvette Girouard Field at Lamson Park Grandstand

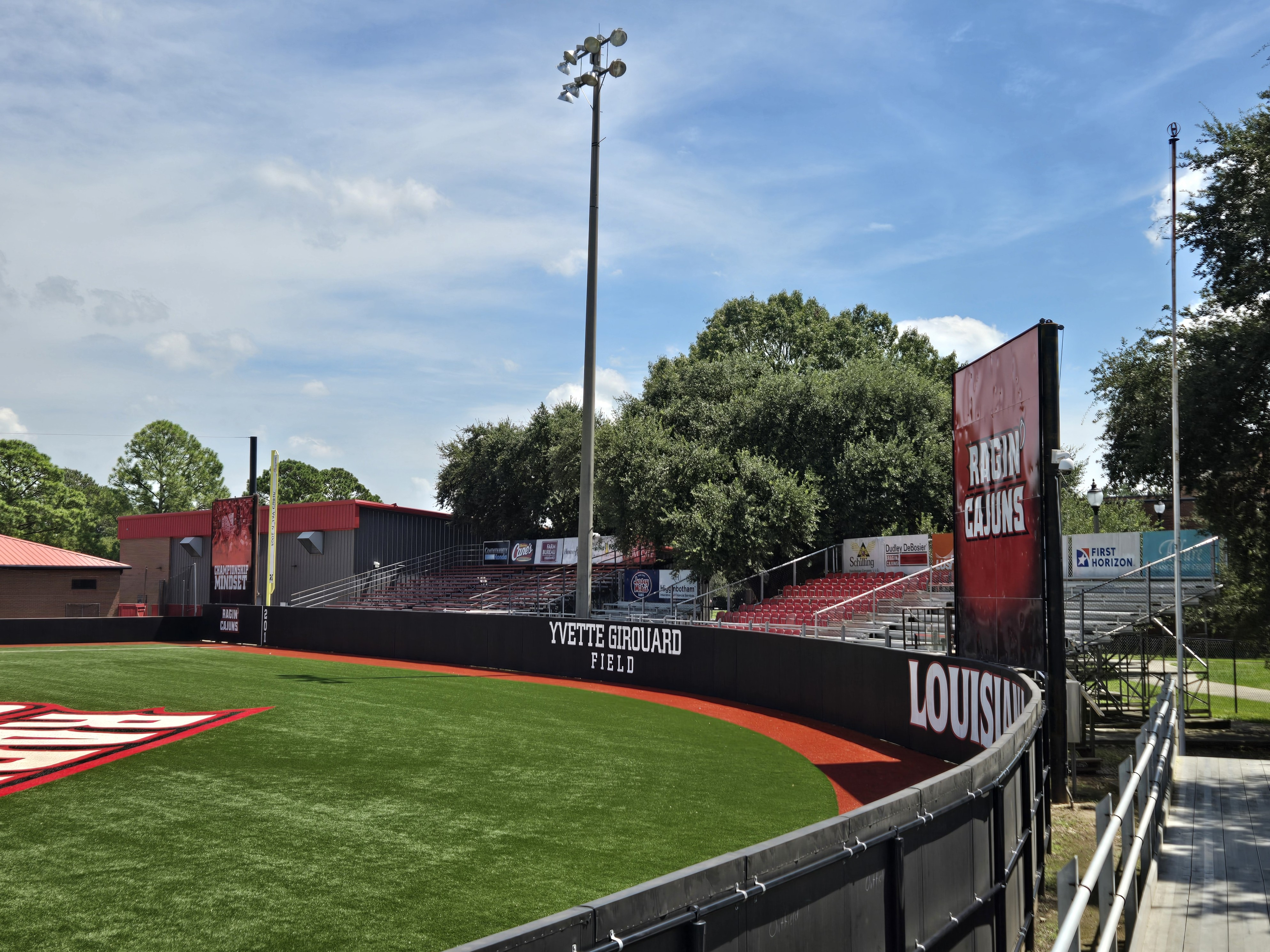
Yvette Girouard Field at Lamson Park Outfield
