= Coastal Carolina Chanticleers softball =

- 2025 Coastal Carolina Chanticleers softball team
- Founded: 1981
- University: Coastal Carolina University
- Head coach: Kelley Green (13th season)
- Conference: Sun Belt
- Location: Conway, South Carolina, US
- Home stadium: St. John Stadium – Charles Wade-John Lott Field (capacity: 500)
- Nickname: Chanticleers
- Colors: Teal, bronze, and black

NCAA Tournament appearances
- 1998, 2000, 2001, 2006, 2012, 2025

Conference tournament championships
- Big South: 1992, 1998, 2000, 2001, 2006, 2012; Sun Belt: 2025

Regular-season conference championships
- Big South: 1990, 1992, 2001, 2002, 2003, 2006, 2013, 2014

The Coastal Carolina Chanticleers softball team represents Coastal Carolina University in NCAA Division I college softball. The team participates in the Sun Belt Conference. The Chanticleers are currently led by thirteenth-year head coach Kelley Green. The team plays its home games at St. John Stadium – Charles Wade-John Lott Field located on the university's campus.
