= Louisiana–Monroe Warhawks softball =

University Softball team

ULM Warhawks
- 2025 Louisiana–Monroe Warhawks softball team
- Founded: 1980 (45 years ago)
- University: University of Louisiana at Monroe
- Head coach: Molly Fichtner (8th season)
- Conference: Sun Belt
- Location: Monroe, Louisiana, US
- Home stadium: Geo-Surfaces Field at the ULM Softball Complex (capacity: 500)
- Nickname: Warhawks
- Colors: Maroon and gold

NCAA Tournament appearances
- 1997

Conference tournament championships
- Southland: 1985, 1986, 1997

Regular-season conference championships
- Southland: 1997; Sun Belt: 2026

The ULM Warhawks softball is the team that represents the University of Louisiana at Monroe in NCAA Division I college softball. The team currently participates in the Sun Belt Conference. The Warhawks are currently led by their head coach Molly Fichtner, who was hired in September 2018. The team plays its home games at the Geo-Surfaces Field at the ULM Softball Complex which is located on the university's campus.

== Perfect games ==
The following perfect games have been thrown by Louisiana–Monroe pitchers over the program's history.

- February 12, 2016. Paige Porter vs Grambling State (won 23–0, 5 innings)

== Coaches ==
	Coach	Seasons	Wins	Losses	Ties	Win %
7	Molly Fichtner	2019–present	24	56	0	.300
6	Corey Lyon	2015–2018	111	115	0	.491
5	Rosemary Holloway-Hill	1985–2014	749	956	3	.439
4	Mary Jo Murray	1984	41	24	2	.627
3	Thomas Avera	1983	9	18	0	.333
2	Cherri Walker	1981–1982	23	40	0	.365
1	Lynette Caldwell	1980	7	7	0	.500

== Year-by-year results ==
Season	Conference	Coach	Overall				Conference				Notes
Season	Conference	Coach	Games	Win	Loss	Tie	Games	Win	Loss	Tie	Notes
1980	N/A	Lynette Caldwell	14	7	7	0	0	0	0	0	
1981	N/A	Cherri Walker	31	14	17	0	0	0	0	0	
1982	N/A	Cherri Walker	32	9	23	0	0	0	0	0	
1983	Southland	Thomas Avera	27	9	18	0	5	3	2	0	
1984	Southland	Mary Jo Murray	67	41	24	2	8	5	3	0	
1985	Southland	Rosemary Holloway-Hill	67	34	32	1	12	7	5	0	Southland Tournament Champions
1986	Southland	Rosemary Holloway-Hill	53	17	36	0	12	3	9	0	Southland Tournament Champions
1987	Southland	Rosemary Holloway-Hill	45	19	26	0	12	8	4	0	
1988	Southland	Rosemary Holloway-Hill	59	24	35	0	13	5	8	0	
1989	Southland	Rosemary Holloway-Hill	63	27	36	0	12	5	7	0	
1990	Southland	Rosemary Holloway-Hill	66	18	48	0	12	5	7	0	
1991	Southland	Rosemary Holloway-Hill	59	22	37	0	22	4	18	0	
1992	Southland	Rosemary Holloway-Hill	74	39	35	0	28	18	10	0	National Invitation Tournament Champions
1993	Southland	Rosemary Holloway-Hill	45	14	30	1	21	9	12	0	
1994	Southland	Rosemary Holloway-Hill	60	31	29	0	30	20	10	0	
1995	Southland	Rosemary Holloway-Hill	58	34	23	1	30	21	9	0	
1996	Southland	Rosemary Holloway-Hill	56	34	22	0	24	15	9	0	
1997	Southland	Rosemary Holloway-Hill	59	47	12	0	23	20	3	0	Southland Tournament Champions
1998	Southland	Rosemary Holloway-Hill	60	23	37	0	27	11	16	0	
1999	Southland	Rosemary Holloway-Hill	64	30	34	0	27	16	11	0	
2000	Southland	Rosemary Holloway-Hill	55	28	27	0	26	17	9	0	
2001	Southland	Rosemary Holloway-Hill	53	31	22	0	27	17	10	0	
2002	Southland	Rosemary Holloway-Hill	52	20	32	0	27	12	15	0	
2003	Southland	Rosemary Holloway-Hill	48	19	29	0	26	9	17	0	
2004	Southland	Rosemary Holloway-Hill	61	13	48	0	26	3	23	0	
2005	Southland	Rosemary Holloway-Hill	59	15	44	0	27	5	22	0	
2006	Southland	Rosemary Holloway-Hill	57	27	30	0	26	10	16	0	
2007	Sun Belt	Rosemary Holloway-Hill	62	24	38	0	24	4	20	0	
2008	Sun Belt	Rosemary Holloway-Hill	59	22	37	0	24	9	15	0	
2009	Sun Belt	Rosemary Holloway-Hill	52	17	35	0	22	7	15	0	
2010	Sun Belt	Rosemary Holloway-Hill	50	24	26	0	23	9	14	0	
2011	Sun Belt	Rosemary Holloway-Hill	55	27	28	0	24	10	14	0	
2012	Sun Belt	Rosemary Holloway-Hill	51	25	26	0	24	9	15	0	
2013	Sun Belt	Rosemary Holloway-Hill	54	19	35	0	23	3	20	0	
2014	Sun Belt	Rosemary Holloway-Hill	52	25	27	0	20	6	14	0	
2015	Sun Belt	Corey Lyon	52	30	22	0	22	10	12	0	
2016	Sun Belt	Corey Lyon	58	24	34	0	24	7	17	0	
2017	Sun Belt	Corey Lyon	63	33	30	0	27	11	16	0	NISC Regional Finalists
2018	Sun Belt	Corey Lyon	53	24	29	0	27	10	17	0	
2019	Sun Belt	Molly Fichtner	56	14	42	0	24	7	17	0	
2020	Sun Belt	Molly Fichtner	24	10	14	0	3	1	2	0	(season shortened due to COVID-19 pandemic)

== See also ==
- List of NCAA Division I softball programs
