= South Alabama Jaguars softball =

- 2026 South Alabama Jaguars softball team
- University: University of South Alabama
- Head coach: Becky Clark (19th season)
- Conference: Sun Belt
- Location: Mobile, Alabama, US
- Home stadium: Jaguar Field (capacity: 1,050)
- Nickname: Jaguars
- Colors: Blue, white, and red

NCAA Tournament appearances
- 2012, 2013, 2014, 2015, 2021, 2024, 2026

Conference tournament championships
- 2012, 2013, 2015, 2026

The South Alabama Jaguars softball team represents the University of South Alabama in NCAA Division I college softball. The team participates in the Sun Belt Conference. The Jaguars are currently led by eighteenth-year head coach Becky Clark, a position she's held since the program started in 2007. The team plays its home games at Jaguar Field located on the outskirts of the university's campus.

== NCAA Regional appearances ==
NCAA Regional Results
2012 Tuscaloosa Regional

Defeated Georgia Tech, 4–3
Lost to Alabama, 2–5
Defeated Georgia Tech, 10–1
Lost to Alabama, 0–6

2013 Mobile Regional

Defeated Mississippi Valley State, 10–0
Lost to Florida State, 1–2
Defeated Mississippi State, 3–0
Defeated Florida State, 3–0
Lost to Florida State, 6–7

2014 Tuscaloosa Regional

Lost to USC Upstate, 3–5
Defeated SIU Edwardsville, 5–1
Defeated USC Upstate, 5–0
Lost to Alabama, 0–3

2015 Auburn Regional

Defeated Chattanooga, 11–1
Lost to Auburn, 0–1
Defeated Tennessee Tech, 9–3
Lost to Auburn, 4–7

2021 Gainesville Regional

Defeated Baylor, 2–0
Lost to Florida, 0–10
Lost to South Florida, 0–1

2024 Gainesville Regional

Defeated Florida Atlantic, 1–0
Lost to Florida, 1–9
Defeated Florida Gulf Coast, 5–1
Lost to Florida, 1–9

2026 Baton Rouge Regional

Lost to Virginia Tech, 0–6
Lost to Akron, 0–1

== Year-by-year results ==
Season	Conference	Coach	Overall				Conference				Notes
Season	Conference	Coach	Games	Win	Loss	Tie	Games	Win	Loss	Tie	Notes
2007	Sun Belt	Becky Clark	59	36	23	0	23	12	11	0	5th Sun Belt Conference
2008	Sun Belt	Becky Clark	53	22	31	0	24	6	18	0	9th Sun Belt Conference
2009	Sun Belt	Becky Clark	56	27	28	1	21	9	12	0	6th Sun Belt Conference
2010	Sun Belt	Becky Clark	45	21	24	0	18	8	10	0	5th Sun Belt Conference
2011	Sun Belt	Becky Clark	54	37	17	0	24	14	10	0	3rd Sun Belt Conference
2012	Sun Belt	Becky Clark	58	41	17	0	24	17	7	0	2nd Sun Belt Conference; Sun Belt Conference Tournament Champions; NCAA Regionals
2013	Sun Belt	Becky Clark	57	48	9	0	20	17	3	0	2nd Sun Belt Conference; Sun Belt Conference Tournament Champions; NCAA Regionals Host
2014	Sun Belt	Becky Clark	54	42	14	0	21	15	6	0	2nd Sun Belt Conference; NCAA Regionals
2015	Sun Belt	Becky Clark	53	40	13	0	20	16	4	0	2nd Sun Belt Conference; Sun Belt Conference Tournament Champions; NCAA Regionals
2016	Sun Belt	Becky Clark	51	33	18	0	23	17	6	0	2nd Sun Belt Conference
2017	Sun Belt	Becky Clark	55	35	20	0	27	15	12	0	4th Sun Belt Conference
2018	Sun Belt	Becky Clark	56	29	27	0	26	13	13	0	6th Sun Belt Conference
2019	Sun Belt	Becky Clark	49	18	31	0	27	7	20	0	9th Sun Belt Conference
2020	Sun Belt	Becky Clark	25	8	17	0	3	2	1	0	(Season cut short by COVID-19 pandemic)
2021	Sun Belt	Becky Clark	52	31	21	0	22	13	9	0	4th Sun Belt Conference; NCAA Regionals
2022	Sun Belt	Becky Clark	46	25	21	0	22	16	6	0	2nd Sun Belt Conference
2023	Sun Belt	Becky Clark	53	39	14	0	24	20	4	0	2nd Sun Belt Conference
2024	Sun Belt	Becky Clark	55	34	20	1	24	16	8	0	3rd Sun Belt Conference; NCAA Regionals
2025	Sun Belt	Becky Clark	51	20	31	0	23	9	14	0	11th Sun Belt Conference
2026	Sun Belt	Becky Clark	59	33	24	0	24	13	11	0	T–5th Sun Belt Conference; Sun Belt Conference Tournament Champions; NCAA Regionals

== Head coaches ==
Head coaches
Years Coached	Name	Wins	Losses	Ties
2007–	Becky Clark	619	420	2

== See also ==
- List of NCAA Division I softball programs
