= Patriot League softball tournament =

American college softball tournament

- Conference softball championship
- Sport: Softball
- Conference: Patriot League
- Number of teams: 4
- Format: Double-elimination tournament
- Played: 1991–present
- Last contest: 2026
- Current champion: Boston University (10)
- Most championships: Lehigh (15)

The Patriot League softball tournament (also referred to as the Patriot League Tournament) is the conference championship tournament in college softball for the Patriot League. It is a double-elimination tournament and seeding is based on regular season records. The winner receives the conference's automatic bid to the NCAA Division I softball tournament. The first year of the event was in 1991. Lehigh has won the most championships, with 15. Boston University won the 2026 tournament, their fourth title in a row and tenth overall.

== Champions ==
=== Year-by-year ===
Year	Champion	Location	MVP
1991	Army	Patriots Park • Allentown, PA	Colleen McCabe, Army
1992	Army	Patriots Park • Allentown, PA	Sheri Schweiker, Army
1993	Lehigh	Patriots Park • Allentown, PA	Kim Miller, Lehigh; Meri Wall, Lehigh
1994	Lehigh	Patriots Park • Allentown, PA	Meri Wall, Lehigh
1995	Lehigh	Patriots Park • Allentown, PA	Nina Rems, Lehigh
1996	Lehigh	Patriots Park • Allentown, PA	Donna Milia, Lehigh
1997	Bucknell	Patriots Park • Allentown, PA	Melanie Kulis, Bucknell; Tara McGoff, Colgate
1998	Holy Cross	Patriots Park • Allentown, PA	Genoa Grosch, Holy Cross
1999	Colgate	Patriots Park • Allentown, PA	Amanda Paolucci, Colgate
2000	Army	Patriots Park • Allentown, PA	Jen Knowlden, Army
2001	Lehigh	Patriots Park • Allentown, PA	Jenny Bender, Lehigh
2002	Army	Kaufman Field • Bethlehem, PA	Nicki Robbins, Army
2003	Colgate	Kaufman Field • Bethlehem, PA	Elena Isaac, Colgate
2004	Lehigh	Kaufman Field • Bethlehem, PA	Mary Wieder, Lehigh
2005	Lehigh	Kaufman Field • Bethlehem, PA	Emily Ling, Lehigh
2006	Lehigh	Kaufman Field • Bethlehem, PA	Lisa Sweeney, Lehigh
2007	Colgate	Kaufman Field • Bethlehem, PA	Kelsey Nordstrom, Colgate
2008	Lehigh	Kaufman Field • Bethlehem, PA	Lisa Sweeney, Lehigh
2009	Lehigh	Kaufman Field • Bethlehem, PA	Lisa Sweeney, Lehigh
2010	Bucknell	Army Softball Complex • West Point, NY	Alex MacLean, Bucknell
2011	Lehigh	Eaton Street Field • Hamilton, NY	Rebecca Bliss, Lehigh
2012	Lehigh	Kaufman Field • Bethlehem, PA	Rebecca Bliss, Lehigh
2013	Army	Kaufman Field • Bethlehem, PA	Morgan Lashley, Army
2014	Boston University	Kaufman Field • Bethlehem, PA	Chelsea Kehr, Boston University
2015	Lehigh	Leadership Park • Bethlehem, PA	Emily Bausher, Lehigh
2016	Boston University	Leadership Park • Bethlehem, PA	Melanie Russell, Boston University
2017	Lehigh	Leadership Park • Bethlehem, PA	Christine Campbell, Lehigh
2018	Boston University	BU Softball Field • Boston, MA	Madi Killebrew, Boston University
2019	Boston University	BU Softball Field • Boston, MA	Alex Heinen, Boston University
2020	Canceled due to the COVID-19 pandemic.		
2021	Boston University	BU Softball Field • Boston, MA	Lauren Nett, Boston University
2022	Lehigh	BU Softball Field • Boston, MA	Gabriella Nori, Lehigh
2023	Boston University	BU Softball Field • Boston, MA	Lauren Nett, Boston University
2024	Boston University	Boston College Softball Field and BU Softball Field • Boston, MA	Kasey Ricard, Boston University
2025	Boston University	Army Softball Complex • West Point, NY	Brooke Deppiesse, Boston University
2026	Boston University	BU Softball Field • Boston, MA	Kasey Ricard, Boston University

=== By school ===
School	Appearances	W	L	Pct.	Championships	Years
Lehigh	34	77	41	.653	15	1993, 1994, 1995, 1996, 2001, 2004, 2005, 2006, 2008, 2009, 2011, 2012, 2015, 2017, 2022
Army	31	51	54	.490	5	1991, 1992, 2000, 2002, 2013
Colgate	27	35	47	.423	3	1999, 2003, 2003, 2007
Bucknell	24	32	44	.421	2	1997, 2010
Holy Cross	15	18	29	.383	1	1998
Lafayette	14	12	28	.316	0	
Boston University	11	30	4	.871	10	2014, 2016, 2018, 2019, 2018, 2021, 2023, 2024, 2025, 2026
Fordham	5	5	10	.333	0	

Italics indicates the school currently does not sponsor softball in the Patriot League.
