= 2020 NCAA Division I softball season =

College softball in the United States

- Duration: February 6 – March 12, 2020 (cancellation)
- Number of teams: 286
- Preseason No. 1: Alabama (USA Softball/ESPN, D1S); Washington (NFCA, SA); UCLA (FloSoftball)
- Defending Champions: UCLA
- TV partner/s: ESPN & ESPN+

NCAA Tournament
- Duration: not held

Women's College World Series
- Duration: not held

Seasons
- ← 2019 2021 →

The 2020 NCAA Division I Softball season, play of college softball in the United States organized by the National Collegiate Athletic Association (NCAA) at the Division I level, began February 6, 2020. The season ended on March 12, 2020, when the NCAA cancelled all winter championships and spring sports seasons due to the coronavirus pandemic. The 2020 NCAA Division I softball tournament and 2020 Women's College World Series, which were to be held in Oklahoma City, Oklahoma at ASA Hall of Fame Stadium, did not occur.

== Coronavirus impact and cancellation ==
As of March 12, 2020, the NCAA cancelled both the remainder of the season and the tournament due to the coronavirus pandemic.

As of 2021, all Division I softball players were given another year of eligibility due to the restraints and cancellations from the coronavirus pandemic. Each player is given the option to use their extra year of eligibility or not.

== Ballpark changes ==
- The 2020 season was the first for Virginia at Palmer Park, replacing The Park. The team played its first game there on March 3 against James Madison.
- The 2020 season was the first for Clemson at Clemson Softball Stadium, and its first season altogether.

== Season outlook ==
USA Today / NFCA DI Coaches Poll
Ranking	Team
1	Washington
2	Alabama
3	Oklahoma
4	UCLA
5	Arizona
6	Texas
7	Florida
8	Minnesota
9	Florida State
10	Louisiana
11	LSU
12	Tennessee
13	Oklahoma State
14	Northwestern
15	Kentucky
16	Georgia
17	Michigan
18	Texas Tech
19	South Carolina
20	James Madison
21	Ole Miss
22	Arizona State
23	Auburn
24	Arkansas
25	Wisconsin

ESPN.com/USA Softball Collegiate Poll
Ranking	Team
1	Alabama
2	Washington
3	Oklahoma
4	UCLA
5	Arizona
6	Texas
7	Minnesota
8	Florida State
9	Florida
10	Louisiana
T11	LSU
T11	Tennessee
13	Oklahoma State
14	Michigan
15	Northwestern
16	Kentucky
17	Georgia
18	James Madison
19	Texas Tech
20	Arkansas
21	South Carolina
22	Arizona State
23	Wisconsin
24	Oregon
25	Ole Miss

D1Softball
Ranking	Team
1	Alabama
2	Washington
3	Arizona
4	UCLA
5	Oklahoma
6	Texas
7	Minnesota
8	Louisiana
9	Florida
10	Florida State
11	LSU
12	Oklahoma State
13	Northwestern
14	Tennessee
15	Georgia
16	Texas Tech
17	Kentucky
18	Michigan
19	Oregon
20	South Carolina
21	Arkansas
22	Auburn
23	Arizona State
24	Wisconsin
25	Missouri

Softball America
Ranking	Team
1	Washington
2	Alabama
3	UCLA
4	Oklahoma
5	Arizona
6	Minnesota
7	Florida State
8	Louisiana
9	Oklahoma State
10	Texas
11	Florida
12	Northwestern
13	LSU
14	Tennessee
15	Michigan
16	Georgia
17	Arkansas
18	Texas Tech
19	James Madison
20	Kentucky
21	Wisconsin
22	South Carolina
23	Auburn
24	Arizona State
25	Oregon

FloSoftball
Ranking	Team
1	UCLA
2	Oklahoma
3	Washington
4	Alabama
5	Arizona
6	Minnesota
7	Texas
8	Louisiana
9	Oklahoma State
10	Florida State
11	Michigan
12	Tennessee
13	Northwestern
14	James Madison
15	LSU
16	Florida
17	Arkansas
18	Ole Miss
19	Wisconsin
20	Arizona State
21	South Carolina
22	Virginia Tech
23	Georgia
24	Kentucky
25	Notre Dame

== Conference standings ==
- Note: Records as of cancellation of season on March 12, 2020.

2020 America East Conference softball standings
	Conf.				Overall
Team	W		L	PCT	W		L	PCT
Stony Brook ‍‍‍	0	–	0	–	10	–	4	.714
Hartford ‍‍‍	0	–	0	–	5	–	4	.556
Albany ‍‍‍	0	–	0	–	6	–	5	.545
UMass Lowell ‍‍‍	0	–	0	–	7	–	9	.438
UMBC ‍‍‍	0	–	0	–	5	–	9	.357
Maine ‍‍‍	0	–	0	–	2	–	7	.222
Binghamton ‍‍‍	0	–	0	–	3	–	12	.200
† – Conference champion ‡ – Tournament champion y – Invited to the NCAA tournament As of March 13, 2020; Rankings from NFCA

2020 American Athletic Conference softball standings
	Conf.						Overall
Team	W		L		T	PCT	W		L		T	PCT
No. 22 UCF ‍‍‍	0	–	0	–	0	–	21	–	5	–	1	.796
UConn ‍‍‍	0	–	0	–	0	–	16	–	5	–	0	.762
Houston ‍‍‍	0	–	0	–	0	–	16	–	6	–	0	.727
Memphis ‍‍‍	0	–	0	–	0	–	16	–	9	–	0	.640
South Florida ‍‍‍	0	–	0	–	0	–	16	–	9	–	0	.640
East Carolina ‍‍‍	0	–	0	–	0	–	14	–	9	–	0	.609
Tulsa ‍‍‍	0	–	0	–	0	–	13	–	11	–	0	.542
Wichita State ‍‍‍	0	–	0	–	0	–	11	–	16	–	0	.407
† – Conference champion ‡ – Tournament champion y – Invited to the NCAA tournament As of March 13, 2020; Rankings from NFCA

2020 Atlantic 10 Conference softball standings
	Conf.				Overall
Team	W		L	PCT	W		L	PCT
George Washington ‍‍‍	0	–	0	–	10	–	14	.417
St. Bonaventure ‍‍‍	0	–	0	–	2	–	3	.400
Dayton ‍‍‍	0	–	0	–	8	–	12	.400
Saint Louis ‍‍‍	0	–	0	–	8	–	13	.381
George Mason ‍‍‍	0	–	0	–	7	–	12	.368
UMass ‍‍‍	0	–	0	–	4	–	7	.364
Fordham ‍‍‍	0	–	0	–	7	–	13	.350
Saint Joseph's ‍‍‍	0	–	0	–	4	–	11	.267
Rhode Island ‍‍‍	0	–	0	–	4	–	14	.222
La Salle ‍‍‍	0	–	0	–	0	–	10	.000
† – Conference champion ‡ – Tournament champion y – Invited to the NCAA tournament As of March 13, 2020; Rankings from NFCA

2020 Atlantic Coast Conference softball standings
	Conf.				Overall
Team	W		L	PCT	W		L	PCT
No. 17 Virginia Tech ‍‍‍	3	–	0	1.000	21	–	4	.840
NC State ‍‍‍	3	–	0	1.000	19	–	6	.760
Clemson ‍‍‍	5	–	1	.833	19	–	8	.704
Georgia Tech ‍‍‍	2	–	1	.667	12	–	11	.522
Syracuse ‍‍‍	2	–	1	.667	10	–	10	.500
North Carolina ‍‍‍	3	–	3	.500	10	–	14	.417
Notre Dame ‍‍‍	2	–	4	.333	13	–	9	.591
Pittsburgh ‍‍‍	2	–	4	.333	8	–	12	.400
Duke ‍‍‍	1	–	2	.333	23	–	4	.852
Boston College ‍‍‍	1	–	2	.333	9	–	12	.429
No. 12 Florida State ‍‍‍	0	–	0	–	17	–	7	.708
Louisville ‍‍‍	0	–	0	–	10	–	13	.435
Virginia ‍‍‍	0	–	6	.000	10	–	12	.455
† – Conference champion ‡ – Tournament champion y – Invited to the NCAA tournament As of March 13, 2020; Rankings from NFCA

2020 ASUN Conference softball standings
	Conf.				Overall
Team	W		L	PCT	W		L	PCT
Kennesaw State ‍‍‍	0	–	0	–	21	–	4	.840
Florida Gulf Coast ‍‍‍	0	–	0	–	19	–	8	.704
North Alabama ‍‍‍	0	–	0	–	16	–	7	.696
North Florida ‍‍‍	0	–	0	–	12	–	6	.667
Jacksonville ‍‍‍	0	–	0	–	15	–	11	.577
Lipscomb ‍‍‍	0	–	0	–	12	–	10	.545
Stetson ‍‍‍	0	–	0	–	12	–	15	.444
Liberty ‍‍‍	0	–	0	–	10	–	13	.435
† – Conference champion ‡ – Tournament champion y – Invited to the NCAA tournament As of March 13, 2020; Rankings from NFCA

2020 Big 12 Conference softball standings
	Conf.				Overall
Team	W		L	PCT	W		L	PCT
No. 3 Texas ‍‍‍	0	–	0	–	24	–	3	.889
No. 6 Oklahoma ‍‍‍	0	–	0	–	20	–	4	.833
No. 24 Baylor ‍‍‍	0	–	0	–	19	–	5	.792
No. 13 Oklahoma State ‍‍‍	0	–	0	–	19	–	5	.792
Texas Tech ‍‍‍	0	–	0	–	17	–	9	.654
Kansas ‍‍‍	0	–	0	–	13	–	13	.500
Iowa State ‍‍‍	0	–	0	–	11	–	13	.458
† – Conference champion ‡ – Tournament champion y – Invited to the NCAA tournament As of March 13, 2020; Rankings from NFCA

2020 Big East Conference softball standings
	Conf.				Overall
Team	W		L	PCT	W		L	PCT
Butler ‍‍‍	0	–	0	–	15	–	8	.652
Creighton ‍‍‍	0	–	0	–	13	–	12	.520
Villanova ‍‍‍	0	–	0	–	14	–	13	.519
Seton Hall ‍‍‍	0	–	0	–	10	–	14	.417
DePaul ‍‍‍	0	–	0	–	8	–	12	.400
Providence ‍‍‍	0	–	0	–	6	–	11	.353
Georgetown ‍‍‍	0	–	0	–	8	–	15	.348
St. John's ‍‍‍	0	–	0	–	8	–	15	.348
† – Conference champion ‡ – Tournament champion y – Invited to the NCAA tournament As of March 13, 2020; Rankings from NFCA

2020 Big Sky Conference softball standings
	Conf.				Overall
Team	W		L	PCT	W		L	PCT
Sacramento State ‍‍‍	0	–	0	–	14	–	11	.560
Montana ‍‍‍	0	–	0	–	12	–	12	.500
Weber State ‍‍‍	0	–	0	–	10	–	14	.417
Northern Colorado ‍‍‍	0	–	0	–	10	–	15	.400
Idaho State ‍‍‍	0	–	0	–	7	–	14	.333
Southern Utah ‍‍‍	0	–	0	–	5	–	14	.263
Portland State ‍‍‍	0	–	0	–	6	–	18	.250
† – Conference champion ‡ – Tournament champion y – Invited to the NCAA tournament As of March 13, 2020; Rankings from NFCA

2020 Big South Conference softball standings
	Conf.				Overall
Team	W		L	PCT	W		L	PCT
Gardner–Webb ‍‍‍	1	–	0	1.000	24	–	5	.828
Radford ‍‍‍	0	–	0	–	13	–	3	.813
Hampton ‍‍‍	0	–	0	–	14	–	4	.778
USC Upstate ‍‍‍	0	–	0	–	17	–	7	.708
Presbyterian ‍‍‍	0	–	0	–	16	–	8	.667
Winthrop ‍‍‍	0	–	0	–	13	–	10	.565
Charleston Southern ‍‍‍	0	–	0	–	10	–	9	.526
Longwood ‍‍‍	0	–	0	–	10	–	11	.476
Campbell ‍‍‍	0	–	1	.000	10	–	15	.400
† – Conference champion ‡ – Tournament champion y – Invited to the NCAA tournament As of March 13, 2020; Rankings from NFCA

2020 Big Ten Conference softball standings
	Conf.						Overall
Team	W		L		T	PCT	W		L		T	PCT
Iowa ‍‍‍	0	–	0	–	0	–	17	–	5	–	0	.773
No. 18 Michigan ‍‍‍	0	–	0	–	0	–	15	–	8	–	0	.652
No. 19 Minnesota ‍‍‍	0	–	0	–	0	–	15	–	9	–	1	.620
Purdue ‍‍‍	0	–	0	–	0	–	15	–	10	–	0	.600
Wisconsin ‍‍‍	0	–	0	–	0	–	14	–	10	–	0	.583
Indiana ‍‍‍	0	–	0	–	0	–	12	–	9	–	0	.571
Maryland ‍‍‍	0	–	0	–	0	–	12	–	11	–	0	.522
Illinois ‍‍‍	0	–	0	–	0	–	11	–	11	–	0	.500
Ohio State ‍‍‍	0	–	0	–	0	–	9	–	9	–	0	.500
Northwestern ‍‍‍	0	–	0	–	0	–	11	–	12	–	0	.478
Penn State ‍‍‍	0	–	0	–	0	–	11	–	15	–	0	.423
Rutgers ‍‍‍	0	–	0	–	0	–	10	–	14	–	0	.417
Nebraska ‍‍‍	0	–	0	–	0	–	9	–	14	–	0	.391
Michigan State ‍‍‍	0	–	0	–	0	–	6	–	16	–	0	.273
† – Conference champion ‡ – Tournament champion y – Invited to the NCAA tournament As of March 13, 2020; Rankings from NFCA

2020 Big West Conference softball standings
	Conf.				Overall
Team	W		L	PCT	W		L	PCT
Cal State Northridge ‍‍‍	0	–	0	–	16	–	8	.667
Cal State Fullerton ‍‍‍	0	–	0	–	14	–	10	.583
UC Davis ‍‍‍	0	–	0	–	16	–	12	.571
Long Beach State ‍‍‍	0	–	0	–	13	–	12	.520
UC Riverside ‍‍‍	0	–	0	–	13	–	12	.520
Cal Poly ‍‍‍	0	–	0	–	10	–	13	.435
UC Santa Barbara ‍‍‍	0	–	0	–	12	–	16	.429
Hawaii ‍‍‍	0	–	0	–	9	–	15	.375
† – Conference champion y – Invited to the NCAA tournament As of March 13, 2020; Rankings from NFCA

2020 Colonial Athletic Association softball standings
	Conf.				Overall
Team	W		L	PCT	W		L	PCT
Delaware ‍‍‍	0	–	0	–	19	–	4	.826
James Madison ‍‍‍	0	–	0	–	12	–	6	.667
Towson ‍‍‍	0	–	0	–	8	–	7	.533
Charleston ‍‍‍	0	–	0	–	10	–	10	.500
Elon ‍‍‍	0	–	0	–	11	–	11	.500
Drexel ‍‍‍	0	–	0	–	4	–	5	.444
UNC Wilmington ‍‍‍	0	–	0	–	7	–	16	.304
Hofstra ‍‍‍	0	–	0	–	3	–	15	.167
† – Conference champion ‡ – Tournament champion y – Invited to the NCAA tournament As of March 13, 2020; Rankings from NFCA

2020 Conference USA softball standings
	Conf.				Overall
Team	W		L	PCT	W		L	PCT
East
Western Kentucky ‍‍‍	3	–	0	1.000	20	–	5	.800
Charlotte ‍‍‍	2	–	1	.667	14	–	13	.519
Florida Atlantic ‍‍‍	1	–	2	.333	8	–	14	.364
Marshall ‍‍‍	0	–	0	–	18	–	7	.720
FIU ‍‍‍	0	–	0	–	8	–	9	.471
Middle Tennessee ‍‍‍	0	–	3	.000	15	–	13	.536
West
North Texas ‍‍‍	2	–	1	.667	19	–	5	.792
Louisiana Tech ‍‍‍	2	–	1	.667	8	–	16	.333
UTSA ‍‍‍	1	–	2	.333	14	–	11	.560
UTEP ‍‍‍	1	–	2	.333	5	–	17	.227
Southern Miss ‍‍‍	0	–	0	–	14	–	8	.636
UAB ‍‍‍	0	–	0	–	15	–	11	.577
x – Division champion † – Conference champion ‡ – Tournament champion y – Invited to the NCAA tournament As of March 13, 2020; Rankings from NFCA

2020 Horizon League softball standings
	Conf.				Overall
Team	W		L	PCT	W		L	PCT
Youngstown State ‍‍‍	0	–	0	–	8	–	7	.533
Northern Kentucky ‍‍‍	0	–	0	–	9	–	10	.474
UIC ‍‍‍	0	–	0	–	9	–	11	.450
Cleveland State ‍‍‍	0	–	0	–	8	–	11	.421
Oakland ‍‍‍	0	–	0	–	7	–	11	.389
Wright State ‍‍‍	0	–	0	–	7	–	11	.389
IUPUI ‍‍‍	0	–	0	–	5	–	15	.250
Green Bay ‍‍‍	0	–	0	–	4	–	15	.211
Detroit Mercy ‍‍‍	0	–	0	–	2	–	21	.087
† – Conference champion ‡ – Tournament champion y – Invited to the NCAA tournament As of March 13, 2020; Rankings from NFCA

2020 Ivy League softball standings
	Conf.				Overall
Team	W		L	PCT	W		L	PCT
Columbia ‍‍‍	0	–	0	–	5	–	4	.556
Penn ‍‍‍	0	–	0	–	7	–	6	.538
Princeton ‍‍‍	0	–	0	–	4	–	4	.500
Cornell ‍‍‍	0	–	0	–	4	–	5	.444
Dartmouth ‍‍‍	0	–	0	–	4	–	5	.444
Yale ‍‍‍	0	–	0	–	5	–	10	.333
Harvard ‍‍‍	0	–	0	–	2	–	8	.200
Brown ‍‍‍	0	–	0	–	1	–	9	.100
† – Conference champion ‡ – Tournament champion y – Invited to the NCAA tournament As of March 13, 2020; Rankings from NFCA

2020 Metro Atlantic Athletic Conference softball standings
	Conf.				Overall
Team	W		L	PCT	W		L	PCT
Monmouth ‍‍‍	0	–	0	–	11	–	9	.550
Marist ‍‍‍	0	–	0	–	10	–	9	.526
Manhattan ‍‍‍	0	–	0	–	6	–	6	.500
Canisius ‍‍‍	0	–	0	–	8	–	9	.471
Niagara ‍‍‍	0	–	0	–	3	–	5	.375
Saint Peter's ‍‍‍	0	–	0	–	4	–	10	.286
Fairfield ‍‍‍	0	–	0	–	4	–	11	.267
Iona ‍‍‍	0	–	0	–	2	–	6	.250
Siena ‍‍‍	0	–	0	–	3	–	10	.231
Quinnipiac ‍‍‍	0	–	0	–	2	–	9	.182
Rider ‍‍‍	0	–	0	–	1	–	10	.091
† – Conference champion ‡ – Tournament champion y – Invited to the NCAA tournament As of March 13, 2020; Rankings from NFCA

2020 Mid-American Conference softball standings
	Conf.				Overall
Team	W		L	PCT	W		L	PCT
Ball State ‍‍‍	0	–	0	–	18	–	9	.667
Bowling Green ‍‍‍	0	–	0	–	11	–	6	.647
Miami (OH) ‍‍‍	0	–	0	–	12	–	8	.600
Toledo ‍‍‍	0	–	0	–	11	–	12	.478
Kent State ‍‍‍	0	–	0	–	9	–	10	.474
Ohio ‍‍‍	0	–	0	–	11	–	15	.423
Northern Illinois ‍‍‍	0	–	0	–	7	–	15	.318
Central Michigan ‍‍‍	0	–	0	–	6	–	13	.316
Akron ‍‍‍	0	–	0	–	6	–	19	.240
Western Michigan ‍‍‍	0	–	0	–	5	–	16	.238
Buffalo ‍‍‍	0	–	0	–	2	–	11	.154
† – Conference champion ‡ – Tournament champion y – Invited to the NCAA tournament As of March 13, 2020; Rankings from NFCA

2020 Mid-Eastern Athletic Conference softball standings
	Conf.				Overall
Team	W		L	PCT	W		L	PCT
Norfolk State ‍‍‍	0	–	0	–	7	–	14	.333
Morgan State ‍‍‍	0	–	0	–	5	–	11	.313
North Carolina A&T ‍‍‍	0	–	0	–	4	–	19	.174
Bethune–Cookman ‍‍‍	0	–	0	–	5	–	28	.152
Florida A&M ‍‍‍	0	–	0	–	3	–	17	.150
Maryland Eastern Shore ‍‍‍	0	–	0	–	3	–	18	.143
Howard ‍‍‍	0	–	0	–	3	–	21	.125
Coppin State ‍‍‍	0	–	0	–	1	–	8	.111
North Carolina Central ‍‍‍	0	–	0	–	1	–	15	.063
Delaware State ‍‍‍	0	–	0	–	1	–	20	.048
South Carolina State ‍‍‍	0	–	0	–	0	–	10	.000
† – Conference champion ‡ – Tournament champion y – Invited to the NCAA tournament As of March 13, 2020; Rankings from NFCA

2020 Missouri Valley Conference softball standings
	Conf.				Overall
Team	W		L	PCT	W		L	PCT
Southern Illinois ‍‍‍	0	–	0	–	15	–	6	.714
Bradley ‍‍‍	0	–	0	–	14	–	9	.609
Loyola Chicago ‍‍‍	0	–	0	–	12	–	9	.571
Evansville ‍‍‍	0	–	0	–	12	–	11	.522
Illinois State ‍‍‍	0	–	0	–	12	–	11	.522
Indiana State ‍‍‍	0	–	0	–	11	–	12	.478
Valparaiso ‍‍‍	0	–	0	–	9	–	10	.474
Missouri State ‍‍‍	0	–	0	–	7	–	12	.368
Drake ‍‍‍	0	–	0	–	8	–	16	.333
Northern Iowa ‍‍‍	0	–	0	–	7	–	14	.333
† – Conference champion ‡ – Tournament champion y – Invited to the NCAA tournament As of March 13, 2020; Rankings from NFCA

2020 Mountain West Conference softball standings
	Conf.				Overall
Team	W		L	PCT	W		L	PCT
No. 25 Fresno State ‍‍‍	0	–	0	–	21	–	4	.840
San Jose State ‍‍‍	0	–	0	–	21	–	5	.808
UNLV ‍‍‍	0	–	0	–	21	–	5	.808
San Diego State ‍‍‍	0	–	0	–	17	–	11	.607
Boise State ‍‍‍	0	–	0	–	14	–	11	.560
Utah State ‍‍‍	0	–	0	–	13	–	11	.542
Colorado State ‍‍‍	0	–	0	–	11	–	12	.478
New Mexico ‍‍‍	0	–	0	–	11	–	15	.423
Nevada ‍‍‍	0	–	0	–	10	–	14	.417
† – Conference champion y – Invited to the NCAA tournament As of March 13, 2020; Rankings from NFCA

2020 Northeast Conference softball standings
	Conf.				Overall
Team	W		L	PCT	W		L	PCT
Sacred Heart ‍‍‍	0	–	0	–	8	–	7	.533
LIU Brooklyn ‍‍‍	0	–	0	–	12	–	12	.500
Robert Morris ‍‍‍	0	–	0	–	8	–	11	.421
Wagner ‍‍‍	0	–	0	–	3	–	6	.333
Bryant ‍‍‍	0	–	0	–	4	–	11	.267
Central Connecticut ‍‍‍	0	–	0	–	1	–	3	.250
Fairleigh Dickinson ‍‍‍	0	–	0	–	4	–	12	.250
Saint Francis (PA) ‍‍‍	0	–	0	–	5	–	18	.217
Merrimack ‍‍‍	0	–	0	–	2	–	10	.167
Mount St. Mary's ‍‍‍	0	–	0	–	2	–	17	.105
† – Conference champion ‡ – Tournament champion y – Invited to the NCAA tournament As of March 13, 2020; Rankings from NFCA

2020 Ohio Valley Conference softball standings
	Conf.				Overall
Team	W		L	PCT	W		L	PCT
Eastern Kentucky ‍‍‍	0	–	0	–	22	–	2	.917
SIU Edwardsville ‍‍‍	0	–	0	–	13	–	5	.722
Southeast Missouri State ‍‍‍	0	–	0	–	12	–	5	.706
Jacksonville State ‍‍‍	0	–	0	–	12	–	9	.571
Murray State ‍‍‍	0	–	0	–	12	–	10	.545
UT Martin ‍‍‍	0	–	0	–	12	–	10	.545
Tennessee Tech ‍‍‍	0	–	0	–	10	–	9	.526
Eastern Illinois ‍‍‍	0	–	0	–	11	–	10	.524
Austin Peay ‍‍‍	0	–	0	–	11	–	12	.478
Tennessee State ‍‍‍	0	–	0	–	7	–	11	.389
Morehead State ‍‍‍	0	–	0	–	6	–	10	.375
Belmont ‍‍‍	0	–	0	–	4	–	14	.222
† – Conference champion ‡ – Tournament champion y – Invited to the NCAA tournament As of March 13, 2020; Rankings from NFCA

2020 Pac-12 Conference softball standings
	Conf.				Overall
Team	W		L	PCT	W		L	PCT
No. 1 UCLA ‍‍‍	0	–	0	–	25	–	1	.962
No. 2 Washington ‍‍‍	0	–	0	–	23	–	2	.920
No. 9 Oregon ‍‍‍	0	–	0	–	22	–	2	.917
No. 4 Arizona ‍‍‍	0	–	0	–	22	–	3	.880
Stanford ‍‍‍	0	–	0	–	22	–	4	.846
Utah ‍‍‍	0	–	0	–	14	–	4	.778
No. 15 Arizona State ‍‍‍	0	–	0	–	22	–	7	.759
Oregon State ‍‍‍	0	–	0	–	18	–	8	.692
California ‍‍‍	0	–	0	–	13	–	11	.542
† – Conference champion y – Invited to the NCAA tournament As of March 13, 2020; Rankings from NFCA

2020 Patriot League softball standings
	Conf.				Overall
Team	W		L	PCT	W		L	PCT
Boston University ‍‍‍	0	–	0	–	14	–	8	.636
Army ‍‍‍	0	–	0	–	14	–	9	.609
Colgate ‍‍‍	0	–	0	–	11	–	9	.550
Lehigh ‍‍‍	0	–	0	–	8	–	9	.471
Bucknell ‍‍‍	0	–	0	–	8	–	14	.364
Holy Cross ‍‍‍	0	–	0	–	2	–	9	.182
Lafayette ‍‍‍	0	–	0	–	1	–	11	.083
† – Conference champion ‡ – Tournament champion y – Invited to the NCAA tournament As of March 13, 2020; Rankings from NFCA

2020 Southeastern Conference softball standings
	Conf.				Overall
Team	W		L	PCT	W		L	PCT
No. 7 Florida ‍‍‍	3	–	0	1.000	23	–	4	.852
No. 23 Missouri ‍‍‍	3	–	0	1.000	19	–	7	.731
No. 11 Kentucky ‍‍‍	2	–	1	.667	20	–	4	.833
No. 14 Georgia ‍‍‍	2	–	1	.667	23	–	5	.821
No. 10 Alabama ‍‍‍	2	–	1	.667	14	–	8	.636
No. 20 Arkansas ‍‍‍	1	–	2	.333	19	–	6	.760
No. 16 South Carolina ‍‍‍	1	–	2	.333	17	–	6	.739
Texas A&M ‍‍‍	1	–	2	.333	17	–	9	.654
No. 21 Mississippi State ‍‍‍	0	–	0	–	25	–	3	.893
No. 5 LSU ‍‍‍	0	–	0	–	21	–	3	.875
Tennessee ‍‍‍	0	–	0	–	14	–	9	.609
Auburn ‍‍‍	0	–	3	.000	16	–	11	.593
Ole Miss ‍‍‍	0	–	3	.000	12	–	13	.480
† – Conference champion ‡ – Tournament champion y – Invited to the NCAA tournament As of March 13, 2020; Rankings from NFCA

2020 Southern Conference softball standings
	Conf.				Overall
Team	W		L	PCT	W		L	PCT
UNC Greensboro ‍‍‍	0	–	0	–	15	–	7	.682
East Tennessee State ‍‍‍	0	–	0	–	9	–	13	.409
Samford ‍‍‍	0	–	0	–	10	–	16	.385
Mercer ‍‍‍	0	–	0	–	10	–	17	.370
Chattanooga ‍‍‍	0	–	0	–	7	–	14	.333
Furman ‍‍‍	0	–	0	–	7	–	19	.269
Western Carolina ‍‍‍	0	–	0	–	3	–	13	.188
† – Conference champion ‡ – Tournament champion y – Invited to the NCAA tournament As of March 13, 2020; Rankings from NFCA

2020 Southland Conference softball standings
	Conf.				Overall
Team	W		L	PCT	W		L	PCT
Stephen F. Austin ‍‍‍	3	–	0	1.000	19	–	4	.826
McNeese State ‍‍‍	3	–	0	1.000	19	–	7	.731
Northwestern State ‍‍‍	3	–	0	1.000	15	–	7	.682
Central Arkansas ‍‍‍	3	–	0	1.000	17	–	9	.654
Southeastern Louisiana ‍‍‍	2	–	1	.667	15	–	8	.652
Nicholls ‍‍‍	2	–	1	.667	12	–	14	.462
Houston Baptist ‍‍‍	1	–	2	.333	12	–	10	.545
Texas A&M–Corpus Christi ‍‍‍	1	–	2	.333	6	–	16	.273
Lamar ‍‍‍	0	–	3	.000	9	–	12	.429
Sam Houston State ‍‍‍	0	–	3	.000	9	–	17	.346
Incarnate Word ‍‍‍	0	–	3	.000	8	–	16	.333
Abilene Christian ‍‍‍	0	–	3	.000	7	–	17	.292
† – Conference champion ‡ – Tournament champion y – Invited to the NCAA tournament As of March 13, 2020; Rankings from NFCA

2020 Southwestern Athletic Conference softball standings
	Conf.				Overall
Team	W		L	PCT	W		L	PCT
East
Alabama State ‍‍‍	0	–	0	–	10	–	15	.400
Jackson State ‍‍‍	0	–	0	–	9	–	14	.391
Mississippi Valley State ‍‍‍	0	–	0	–	5	–	15	.250
Alcorn State ‍‍‍	0	–	0	–	5	–	21	.192
Alabama A&M ‍‍‍	0	–	0	–	2	–	11	.154
West
Texas Southern ‍‍‍	0	–	0	–	8	–	14	.364
Southern ‍‍‍	0	–	0	–	4	–	11	.267
Prairie View A&M ‍‍‍	0	–	0	–	3	–	9	.250
Grambling State ‍‍‍	0	–	0	–	3	–	13	.188
Arkansas–Pine Bluff ‍‍‍	0	–	0	–	1	–	15	.063
x – Division champion † – Conference champion ‡ – Tournament champion y – Invited to the NCAA tournament As of March 13, 2020; Rankings from NFCA

2020 Summit League softball standings
	Conf.				Overall
Team	W		L	PCT	W		L	PCT
South Dakota State ‍‍‍	0	–	0	–	15	–	8	.652
Omaha ‍‍‍	0	–	0	–	12	–	12	.500
South Dakota ‍‍‍	0	–	0	–	11	–	18	.379
Western Illinois ‍‍‍	0	–	0	–	6	–	13	.316
North Dakota State ‍‍‍	0	–	0	–	7	–	16	.304
North Dakota ‍‍‍	0	–	0	–	7	–	17	.292
Purdue Fort Wayne ‍‍‍	0	–	0	–	3	–	21	.125
† – Conference champion ‡ – Tournament champion y – Invited to the NCAA tournament As of March 13, 2020; Rankings from NFCA

2020 Sun Belt Conference softball standings
	Conf.				Overall
Team	W		L	PCT	W		L	PCT
No. 8 Louisiana ‍‍‍	2	–	1	.667	18	–	6	.750
Texas State ‍‍‍	2	–	1	.667	15	–	9	.625
Georgia Southern ‍‍‍	2	–	1	.667	14	–	10	.583
UT Arlington ‍‍‍	2	–	1	.667	12	–	13	.480
South Alabama ‍‍‍	2	–	1	.667	8	–	17	.320
Troy ‍‍‍	1	–	2	.333	16	–	6	.727
Coastal Carolina ‍‍‍	1	–	2	.333	13	–	8	.619
Appalachian State ‍‍‍	1	–	2	.333	13	–	9	.591
Louisiana–Monroe ‍‍‍	1	–	2	.333	10	–	14	.417
Georgia State ‍‍‍	1	–	2	.333	7	–	16	.304
† – Conference champion ‡ – Tournament champion y – Invited to the NCAA tournament As of March 13, 2020; Rankings from NFCA

2020 West Coast Conference softball standings
	Conf.						Overall
Team	W		L		T	PCT	W		L		T	PCT
BYU ‍‍‍	0	–	0	–	0	–	14	–	8	–	0	.636
Pacific ‍‍‍	0	–	0	–	0	–	15	–	10	–	0	.600
San Diego ‍‍‍	0	–	0	–	0	–	15	–	12	–	0	.556
Loyola Marymount ‍‍‍	0	–	0	–	0	–	12	–	10	–	0	.545
Santa Clara ‍‍‍	0	–	0	–	0	–	8	–	14	–	0	.364
Saint Mary's ‍‍‍	0	–	0	–	0	–	7	–	18	–	1	.288
† – Conference champion y – Invited to the NCAA tournament As of March 13, 2020; Rankings from NFCA

2020 Western Athletic Conference softball standings
	Conf.				Overall
Team	W		L	PCT	W		L	PCT
New Mexico State ‍‍‍	0	–	0	–	15	–	8	.652
Utah Valley ‍‍‍	0	–	0	–	12	–	7	.632
California Baptist ‍‍‍	0	–	0	–	10	–	14	.417
Seattle ‍‍‍	0	–	0	–	9	–	15	.375
Kansas City ‍‍‍	0	–	0	–	6	–	13	.316
Grand Canyon ‍‍‍	0	–	0	–	7	–	20	.259
Cal State Bakersfield ‍‍‍	0	–	0	–	1	–	13	.071
† – Conference champion ‡ – Tournament champion y – Invited to the NCAA tournament As of March 13, 2020; Rankings from NFCA

== Awards ==
- Softball America Player of the Year: Miranda Elish, Texas
- Softball America Pitcher of the Year: Megan Faraimo, UCLA
- Softball America Freshman of the Year: Maya Brady, UCLA
- Softball America Defensive Player of the Year: Sis Bates, Washington

== Coaching changes ==
This table lists programs that changed head coaches at any point from the first day of the 2020 season until the day before the first day of the 2021 season.

Team	Former coach	Interim coach	New coach	Reason
California	Diane Ninemire	Tammy Lohmann		On March 4, 2020, Longtime Cal head coach Diane Ninemire steps down after 32 years for health reasons. Associate head coach Tammy Lohmann will serve as interim head coach for the remainder of the season.
Minnesota	Jamie Trachsel		Piper Ritter	On April 23, 2020, Ole Miss hired Jamie Trachsel as their head coach. On May 3, 2020, Minnesota announced the hiring of pitching coach Piper Ritter as their new head coach.
Ole Miss	Ruben Felix		Jamie Trachsel	On April 23, 2020, Ole Miss hired Minnesota head coach Jamie Trachsel as their head coach replacing interim coach Ruben Felix.

== See also ==
- 2020 NCAA Division I baseball season
