= 2026 Patriot League softball tournament =

College softball tournament in Massachusetts

- Teams: 4
- Format: Double-elimination tournament
- Finals site: BU Softball Field; Boston, Massachusetts
- Champions: Boston University (9th title)
- Winning coach: Ashley Waters (8th title)
- MVP: Kasey Ricard (Boston University)
- Television: ESPN+

2026 Patriot League softball standings
	Conf.						Overall
Team	W		L		T	PCT	W		L		T	PCT
Boston University ‍†‍‡‍^{y}	16	–	2	–	0	.889	47	–	15	–	0	.758
Colgate ‍‍‍	13	–	5	–	0	.722	29	–	26	–	0	.527
Army ‍‍‍	12	–	6	–	0	.667	33	–	25	–	0	.569
Lafayette ‍‍‍	7	–	11	–	0	.389	16	–	36	–	0	.308
Bucknell ‍‍‍	6	–	12	–	0	.333	9	–	35	–	1	.211
Lehigh ‍‍‍	5	–	13	–	0	.278	26	–	28	–	0	.481
Holy Cross ‍‍‍	4	–	14	–	0	.222	10	–	34	–	0	.227
† – Conference champion ‡ – Tournament champion y – Invited to the NCAA tournament As of May 17, 2026; Rankings from NFCA/USA Today

The 2026 Patriot League softball tournament was held at BU Softball Field in Boston, Massachusetts from May 7 through May 9, 2026. The tournament was won by the Boston University Terriers, who earned the Patriot League's automatic bid to the 2026 NCAA Division I softball tournament.

== Format and seeding ==
The top four teams from the conference's round-robin regular season will qualify for the tournament, and will be seeded one through four. They will play a double-elimination tournament.

== Tournament ==
Upper round 1
1	Boston University	7
4	Lafayette	3
2	Colgate	3
3	Army	6
Lower round 1
4	Lafayette	5
2	Colgate	10

Upper final
1	Boston University	3
3	Army	1
Lower final
3	Army	2
2	Colgate	4

Final
1	Boston University	12^{(5)}	—
2	Colgate	1	—

== All Tournament Team ==
Player	Team
Ashton White	Army
Breanna Izzo	Army
Kylie Doherty	Boston University
**Kasey Ricard**	Boston University
Kyomi Apalit	Boston University
Sophie Naviar	Boston University
Nora Megenity	Colgate
Analia Raffaelli	Colgate
Kelcie McGraw	Colgate
Kylee Sweet	Lafayette
Marisa Powell	Lafayette

MVP in bold
