= 2015 Patriot League softball tournament =

The 2015 Patriot League softball tournament was held at Leadership Park on the campus of Lehigh University in Bethlehem, Pennsylvania from May 7 through May 9, 2015. It was won by the Lehigh Mountain Hawks, who advanced to the 2015 NCAA Division I softball tournament.

== Tournament ==
1st Round
1	Lehigh	4
4	Army West Point	0
2	Bucknell	3
3	Colgate	1
Lower round 1
4	Army West Point	2
3	Colgate	4

Semifinals
1	Lehigh	5
2	Bucknell	4
Lower final
2	Bucknell	4
3	Colgate	1

Championship
1	Lehigh	8	–
2	Bucknell	0^{(6)}	–

- All times listed are Eastern Daylight Time.
