= Jen McIntyre =

American softball coach

Biographical details
- Born: October 31, 1976 (age 49); Richmond, Virginia, U.S.

Playing career
- 1995–1998: Penn State
- Position: Third baseman

Coaching career (HC unless noted)
- 2000–2001: Indiana (asst.)
- 2002–2013: Penn State (asst.)
- 2014: Boston University (asst.)
- 2015–2019: Connecticut
- 2020-2023: Ohio State (AHC)

Head coaching record
- Overall: 74–133 (.357)

Accomplishments and honors

Awards
- As an Assistant: NFCA Assistant Coach of the Year (2014)

Jennifer Ann McIntyre (born October 31, 1976) is an American college softball coach, and is the former head coach of the Connecticut Huskies softball team.

== Playing career ==
Born in Richmond, Virginia, McIntyre graduated from Midlothian High School in Midlothian, Virginia. McIntyre played at Penn State from 1995 to 1998, where she was the starting third baseman for all four years. She was team MVP as a junior, and a captain in her senior year. She was named a 1997 Academic All-American, and was a three time Academic All-Big Ten selection. McIntyre is sixth all-time in stolen bases.

== Coaching career ==
In 2000, McIntyre became an assistant at Indiana, where she remained for two seasons. She then returned to her alma mater, Penn State for 12 seasons, rising to the position of associate head coach, and helping the Nittany Lions to 6 NCAA Division I softball championship appearances. Next, McIntyre served as associate head coach at Boston University for only one season. In that season, the Terriers won the Patriot League softball tournament and recorded a win in the NCAA tournament against Louisville. On July 7, 2014, she was named head coach at Connecticut, succeeding legendary coach Karen Mullins. In her first season, the Huskies finished 18–35.

== Head coaching record ==
Record table
Season	Team	Overall	Conference	Standing	Postseason
Connecticut (American Athletic Conference) (2015–present)
2015	Connecticut	18–35	4–13	7th	
2016	Connecticut	19–33	4–12	7th	
2017	Connecticut	17–30	3–14	7th	
2018	Connecticut	20–35	5–16	8th	
2019	Connecticut	16-27	4-11	6th	
Connecticut:		74–133 (.357)	16–55 (.225)		
Total:		74–133 (.357)			
