= La Salle Explorers softball =

College softball team

La Salle Explorers
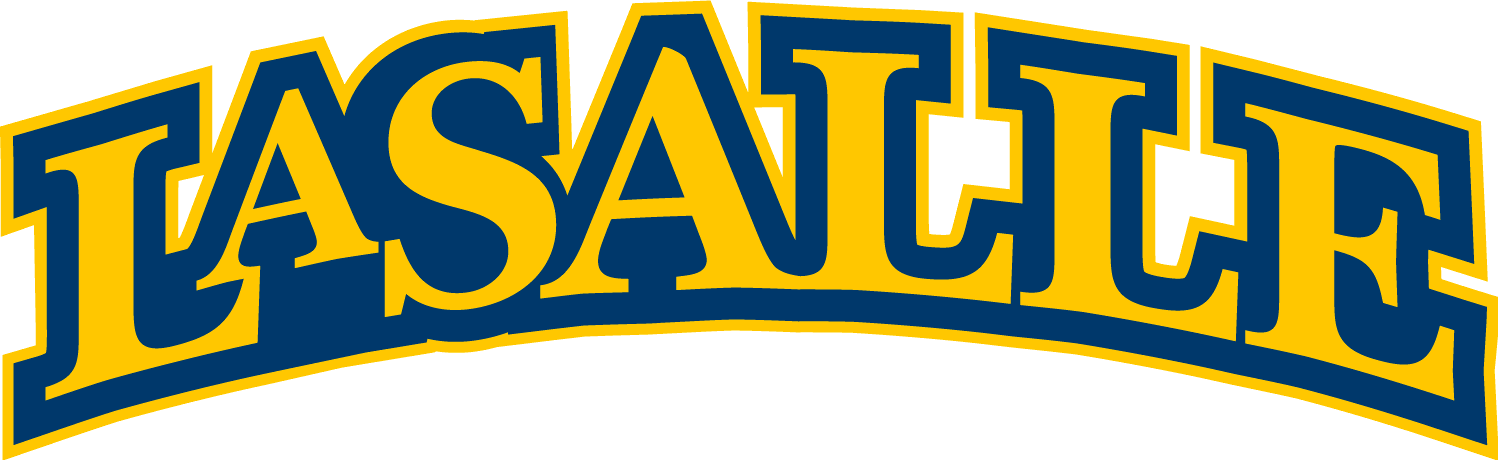
- University: La Salle University
- Head coach: Sarah Prezioso (1st season)
- Conference: Atlantic 10
- Location: Philadelphia, Pennsylvania, US
- Home stadium: West Campus Field
- Nickname: Explorers
- Colors: Blue and gold

Conference tournament championships
- 1987, 1989, 1990, 1992

Regular-season conference championships
- 1989, 1990, 1992

For information on all La Salle University sports, see La Salle Explorers

The La Salle Explorers softball team represented La Salle University in NCAA Division I college softball from 1973 until 2021. From 1986 until 1992, the team was a member of the Metro Atlantic Athletic Conference (MAAC). From 1993 until 1995, the team was a member of the Midwestern Collegiate Conference (MCC). From 1995 until the school's final season in 2021, they were a member of the Atlantic 10 Conference (A-10). The Explorers were most recently led by interim head coach Sarah Prezioso. The team formerly played its home games at West Campus Field, which is located on the college's campus.

On September 29, 2020, it was announced that the school would be cutting seven athletic programs, including the softball team, citing enrollment and financial issues that were accelerated by the COVID-19 pandemic. The team played its final season in 2021.

== History ==
After joining the Metro Atlantic Athletic Conference in 1987, La Salle found significant success throughout their tenure, winning three regular season championships and four MAAC tournament championships. The Explorers defeated Fairfield to win the tournament in 1989, Army to win in 1990, and Canisius to win in 1992. In 1990, head coach Rick Pohlig was named MAAC Coach of the Year. In 1990 and 1992, pitcher Andrea Huck was named MAAC Player of the Year. For her career accomplishments, Huck was named to the MAAC's 40th Anniversary softball team, along with former teammates Kelli McGahey, Kerri McGahey, and Mary McGrath.

In 1991, it was announced that La Salle would be leaving the MAAC to join the Midwestern Collegiate Conference in an attempt to shift the conference from a regional one to a national one. In 1995, it was announced that La Salle would again be switching conferences, this time to the Atlantic 10 Conference. In 1997, pitcher Debbie Klawiter was named A-10 Rookie of the Year. In the same year, head coach Ray Perri was named A-10 Coach of the Year, the team's only coaching award during their tenure in the Atlantic 10 Conference. In 2001, infielder Amanda Clark was named A-10 Rookie of the Year.

On September 29, 2020, it was announced that the school would be cutting seven athletic programs, including the softball team, citing enrollment and financial issues that were accelerated by the COVID-19 pandemic. The program cuts drew criticism from student-athletes in addition to threats of a Title IX lawsuit.

Prior to the start of the program's final season in 2021, Brooke Darreff was replaced as head coach by interim Sarah Prezioso. The Explorers finished their final season in 2021 with a 0–30 record, ending the softball program's 48 year history with three regular season championships, four conference tournament championships, and no appearances in the NCAA tournament.

=== Coaching history ===
Years	Coach	Record	%
1973–1975	Elanor Snell	2–17	.105
1976–1991	Rick Pohlig	284–214–2	.570
1992–1998	Ray Perri	182–171	.516
1999–2002	Carla Camino	29–116	.200
2003–2008	Joe DiPietro	87–171–1	.337
2009–2012	Brianne Brown	36–127	.221
2013–2017	Ron Shoemaker	85–132	.392
2018–2020	Brooke Darreff	24–77	.238
2021	Sarah Prezioso	0–30	.000

== Roster ==
2021 La Salle Explorers final roster
Pitchers: 8 – Sarah Dowalo – Junior; 2 – Morgan Orlowski – Senior; 77 – Regan Ware – Sophomore; Catchers: 10 – Mia Recenello – Sophomore; 7 – Casey Walker – Sophomore; 11 – Victoria Zatko – Sophomore; Outfielders: 16 – Lauren Begg – Sophomore; 12 – Maddy Little – Sophomore	Infielders: 45 – Tessa Dodson – Freshman; 1 – Alyssa Fagans – Freshman; 14 – Ashley Mendenhall – Senior; 27 – Natalie Rios – Junior; Utility: 13 – Makie Paxson – Freshman; 9 – Kaylee Piven – Junior

== Season-by-season results ==
Record table
Season	Coach	Overall	Conference	Standing	Postseason
La Salle Explorers (Independent) (1973–1985)
1973	Elanor Snell	0–5			
1974	Elanor Snell	0–7			
1975	Elanor Snell	2–5			
1976	Rick Pohlig	5–1			
1977	Rick Pohlig	5–3			
1978	Rick Pohlig	7–5			
1979	Rick Pohlig	13–1			
1980	Rick Pohlig	9–2			
1981	Rick Pohlig	23–13			
1982	Rick Pohlig	19–11			
1983	Rick Pohlig	18–11			
1984	Rick Pohlig	23–19			
1985	Rick Pohlig	29–22			
La Salle Explorers (Metro Atlantic Athletic Conference) (1986–1992)
1986	Rick Pohlig	16–22–1	(Note: Conference records are unavailable as MAAC records are incomplete and La Salle records do not include conference win/loss or standings.)	(Note: Conference records are unavailable as MAAC records are incomplete and La Salle records do not include conference win/loss or standings.)	
1987	Rick Pohlig	22–20		3rd	
1988	Rick Pohlig	14–27		2nd	
1989	Rick Pohlig	23–24		1st	
1990	Rick Pohlig	29–15–1		1st	
1991	Rick Pohlig	29–18		3rd	
1992	Ray Perri	33–16		1st	
La Salle Explorers (Midwestern Collegiate Conference) (1993–1995)
1993	Ray Perri	25–25	6–6	T–4th	
1994	Ray Perri	25–23	2–8	T–5th	
1995	Ray Perri	26–35	6–12	6th	
La Salle Explorers (Atlantic 10 Conference) (1996–2021)
1996	Ray Perri	23–26	9–7	4th	
1997	Ray Perri	31–18	11–5	3rd	
1998	Ray Perri	19–28	5–11	8th	
1999	Carla Camino	11–32	5–11	7th	
2000	Carla Camino	9–46	1–15	9th	
2001	Carla Camino	9–38	5–16	T–7th	
2002	Carla Camino	12–36	3–18	T–7th	
2003	Joe DiPietro	15–28	5–9	7th	
2004	Joe DiPietro	10–31	2–10	8th	
2005	Joe DiPietro	12–32–1	2–10	9th	
2006	Joe DiPietro	12–33	2–18	11th	
2007	Joe DiPietro	16–23	8–11	7th	
2008	Joe DiPietro	22–24	8–12	8th	
2009	Brianne Brown	9–29	6–13	9th	
2010	Brianne Brown	13–30	2–18	11th	
2011	Brianne Brown	5–38	2–16	10th	
2012	Brianne Brown	9–40	3–17	11th	
2013	Ron Shoemaker	16–31	3–19	12th	
2014	Ron Shoemaker	18–24	9–9	T–5th	
2015	Ron Shoemaker	15–22	9–11	5th	
2016	Ron Shoemaker	16–28	7–14	9th	
2017	Ron Shoemaker	20–27	7–16	9th	
2018	Brooke Darreff	12–34	3–19	10th	
2019	Brooke Darreff	12–33	5–17	T–9th	
2020	Brooke Darreff	0–10	0–0		Season cut short due to COVID-19 pandemic
2021	Sarah Prezioso	0–31	0–20	10th	
Total:		729–1,055–3 (.409)			
National champion Postseason invitational champion Conference regular season champion Conference regular season and conference tournament champion Division regular season champion Division regular season and conference tournament champion Conference tournament champion

== See also ==
- List of NCAA Division I softball programs
