= 2021 Patriot League softball tournament =

- Teams: 4
- Format: Double-elimination tournament
- Finals site: BU Softball Field; Boston, Massachusetts
- Champions: Boston University (5th title)
- Winning coach: Ashley Waters (4th title)
- Television: ESPN+

The 2021 Patriot League softball tournament was held at the BU Softball Field on the campus of Boston University in Boston, Massachusetts from May 13 through May 15, 2021. The tournament was won by the Boston University Terriers, who earned the Patriot League's automatic bid to the 2021 NCAA Division I softball tournament

== Tournament ==
=== Bracket ===
Thursday, May 13
1	Boston University	5
4	Army	4
Winner's bracket
2	Lehigh	7
3	Colgate	0
3	Colgate	4
4	Army	3
Loser's bracket

Friday, May 14
1	Boston University	9
2	Lehigh	1
3	Colgate	3
2	Lehigh	4

Saturday, May 15
1	Boston University	9	–
2	Lehigh	2	–
