= 2019 Patriot League softball tournament =

- Teams: 4
- Format: Double-elimination tournament
- Finals site: BU Softball Field; Boston, Massachusetts
- Champions: Boston University (4th title)
- Winning coach: Ashley Waters (3rd title)

The 2019 Patriot League softball tournament was held at the BU Softball Field on the campus of Boston University in Boston, Massachusetts from May 9 through May 11, 2019. The tournament was won by the Boston University Terriers, who earned the Patriot League's automatic bid to the 2019 NCAA Division I softball tournament

== Tournament ==
=== Bracket ===
Thursday, May 9
1	Boston University	3
4	Colgate	0
Winner's bracket
2	Bucknell	2
3	Lehigh	7
2	Bucknell	5
4	Colgate	2
Loser's bracket

Friday, May 10
1	Boston University	2
3	Lehigh	1
2	Bucknell	2
3	Lehigh	3

Saturday, May 11
1	Boston University	14	–
3	Lehigh	7	–
