= List of NCAA Division I softball programs =

The following is a list of schools that participate in NCAA Division I softball, according to NCAA.com. These teams compete to go to Oklahoma City, Oklahoma, and Devon Park for the Women's College World Series. (For schools whose athletic branding does not directly correspond with the school name, the athletic branding is in parentheses.)

Conference affiliations reflect those in the next NCAA softball season in 2027. Years of conference changes, indicated in footnotes, reflect softball seasons, which take place in the calendar year after a conference change takes effect.

School	Nickname	State	Home field	Head coach(es)	Conference	WCWS appearances (Note: Both Division I tournaments in 1982—AIAW and NCAA—were named "Women's College World Series".)	National titles (Note: The only national titles not listed here are those won by Texas Woman's University in 1979 and John F. Kennedy College in 1969–1971. TWU now competes at the Division II level. JFK College is defunct.)
University at Albany, The State University of New York (Albany)	Great Danes	New York	Albany Field	Chris Cannata	America East	None	None
State University of New York at Binghamton (Binghamton)	Bearcats	New York	Varsity Field	Jess Bump	America East	None	None
Bryant University	Bulldogs	Rhode Island	Bryant Softball Complex at Conaty Park	Bianka Bell	America East	None	None
University of Maine	Black Bears	Maine	Mike Kessock Field	Kim Stiles	America East	None	None
University of Massachusetts Lowell (UMass Lowell)	River Hawks	Massachusetts	River View Field	Jen Starek	America East	None	None
University of Maryland, Baltimore County (UMBC)	Retrievers	Maryland	UMBC Softball Stadium	Angie Nicholson	America East	None	None
University of North Carolina at Charlotte (Charlotte)	49ers	North Carolina	D. L. Phillips Complex	Courtney Breault	American	None	None
East Carolina University	Pirates	North Carolina	ECU Softball Stadium	Shane Winkler	American	None	None
Florida Atlantic University	Owls	Florida	FAU Softball Stadium	Jordan Clark	American	None	None
University of Memphis	Tigers	Tennessee	Tiger Softball Complex	Trena Prater	American	None	None
University of North Texas	Mean Green	Texas	Lovelace Stadium	Cody White	American	None	None
University of South Florida	Bulls	Florida	USF Softball Stadium	Ken Eriksen	American	2012	None
University of Tulsa	Golden Hurricane	Oklahoma	Collins Family Softball Complex	DJ Gasso	American	None	None
University of Alabama at Birmingham (UAB)	Blazers	Alabama	UAB Softball Field	Taylor Smartt	American	None	None
University of Texas at San Antonio (UTSA)	Roadrunners	Texas	Roadrunner Field	Vann Stuedeman	American	None	None
Wichita State University	Shockers	Kansas	Wilkins Stadium	Kristi Bredbenner	American	None	None
Boston College (BC)	Eagles	Massachusetts	Brighton Field	Beth Krysiak	ACC	None	None
University of California, Berkeley (California or Cal)	Golden Bears	California	Levine-Fricke Field	Steve Singleton	ACC	1980, 1981, 1982 (AIAW), 1986, 1992, 1996, 1999, 2000, 2001, 2002, 2003, 2004, 2005, 2011, 2012	2002
Clemson University	Tigers	South Carolina	McWhorter Stadium	John Rittman	ACC	None	None
Duke University	Blue Devils	North Carolina	Duke Softball Stadium	Marissa Young	ACC	2024	None
Florida State University	Seminoles	Florida	JoAnne Graf Field at the Seminole Softball Complex	Lonni Alameda	ACC	1987, 1990, 1991, 1992, 1993, 2002, 2004, 2014, 2016, 2018, 2021, 2023	2018
Georgia Institute of Technology (Georgia Tech)	Yellow Jackets	Georgia	Shirley Clements Mewborn Field	Aileen Morales	ACC	None	None
University of Louisville	Cardinals	Kentucky	Ulmer Stadium	Holly Aprile	ACC	None	None
University of North Carolina at Chapel Hill (North Carolina)	Tar Heels	North Carolina	Anderson Softball Stadium	Megan Smith	ACC	None	None
North Carolina State University (NC State)	Wolfpack	North Carolina	Dail Softball Stadium	Lindsay Leftwich	ACC	None	None
University of Notre Dame	Fighting Irish	Indiana	Melissa Cook Stadium	Kris Ganeff	ACC	None	None
University of Pittsburgh (Pitt)	Panthers	Pennsylvania	Vartabedian Field	Jenny Allard	ACC	None	None
Stanford University	Cardinal	California	Boyd & Jill Smith Family Stadium	Jessica Allister	ACC	2001, 2004, 2023, 2024	None
Syracuse University	Orange	New York	Skytop Softball Stadium	Shannon Doepking	ACC	None	None
University of Virginia	Cavaliers	Virginia	Palmer Park	Joanna Hardin	ACC	None	None
Virginia Polytechnic Institute and State University (Virginia Tech)	Hokies	Virginia	Tech Softball Park	Pete D'Amour	ACC	2008	None
Bellarmine University	Knights	Kentucky	Knights Softball Field	Whitney Arion	ASUN	None	None
Florida Gulf Coast University (FGCU)	Eagles	Florida	FGCU Softball Complex	Lindsay Fico	ASUN	None	None
Jacksonville University	Dolphins	Florida	Pruitt Softball Complex	Erica Ayers	ASUN	None	None
Lipscomb University	Lady Bisons	Tennessee	Draper Diamond	Kristin Ryman	ASUN	None	None
University of North Florida	Ospreys	Florida	UNF Softball Complex	Jeff Conrad	ASUN	None	None
Queens University of Charlotte	Royals	North Carolina	Park Road Park	Kella Goins	ASUN	None	None
Stetson University	Hatters	Florida	Patricia Wilson Field	Shellie Robinson	ASUN	None	None
University of West Florida	Argonauts	Florida	UWF Softball Complex	Ashliegh McLean	ASUN	None	None
University of Dayton	Flyers	Ohio	UD Softball Stadium	Cara LaPlaca	Atlantic 10	None	None
Fordham University	Rams	New York	Bahoshy Softball Complex/Murphy Field	Melissa Inouye	Atlantic 10	None	None
George Mason University	Patriots	Virginia	George Mason Softball Complex	Justin Walker	Atlantic 10	None	None
George Washington University	Revolutionaries	Washington, D.C.	Mount Vernon Athletic Complex	Matt Klampert	Atlantic 10	None	None
Loyola University Chicago (Loyola Chicago)	Ramblers	Illinois	Loyola Softball Park	Alicia Abbott	Atlantic 10	None	None
University of Rhode Island	Rams	Rhode Island	URI Softball Complex	Mike Coutts	Atlantic 10	1982 (AIAW)	None
St. Bonaventure University	Bonnies	New York	St. Bonaventure Softball Diamond	Camden Decker	Atlantic 10	None	None
Saint Joseph's University	Hawks	Pennsylvania	SJU Softball Field	Gina McCool	Atlantic 10	None	None
Saint Louis University	Billikens	Missouri	Billiken Sports Center	Christy Connoyer	Atlantic 10	None	None
Butler University	Bulldogs	Indiana	Butler Softball Field	Scott Hall	Big East	None	None
University of Connecticut (UConn)	Huskies	Connecticut	Burrill Family Field at the Connecticut Softball Complex	Laura Valentino	Big East	1993	None
Creighton University	Bluejays	Nebraska	Creighton Sports Complex	Krista Wood	Big East	1969, 1980, 1981, 1982 (NCAA), 1986	None
DePaul University	Blue Demons	Illinois	Cacciatore Stadium	Liz Bouck-Jagielski	Big East	1999, 2000, 2005, 2007	None
Georgetown University	Hoyas	Washington, D.C.	Guy Mason Field	Karla Ross	Big East	None	None
Providence College	Friars	Rhode Island	Glay Field	Jill Karwoski	Big East	None	None
St. John's University	Red Storm	New York	Red Storm Field	Bob Guerrero	Big East	None	None
Seton Hall University	Pirates	New Jersey	Mike Sheppard, Sr. Field	Angie Churchill	Big East	None	None
Villanova University	Wildcats	Pennsylvania	Villanova Softball Complex	Bridget Orchard	Big East	None	None
Idaho State University	Bengals	Idaho	Miller Ranch Stadium	Vacant	Big Sky	None	None
University of Montana	Grizzlies	Montana	Grizzly Softball Field	Stef Ewing	Big Sky	None	None
University of Northern Colorado	Bears	Colorado	Gloria Rodriguez Field	Dedeann Pendleton-Helm	Big Sky	1969, 1970, 1971, 1972, 1973, 1974, 1975, 1976, 1977, 1978, 1979	None
Portland State University	Vikings	Oregon	Erv Lind Stadium	Meadow McWhorter	Big Sky	1978	None
Southern Utah University	Thunderbirds	Utah	Kathryn Berg Field	Don Don Williams	Big Sky	None	None
Utah Tech University	Trailblazers	Utah	Karl Brooks Field	Randy Simkins	Big Sky	None	None
Weber State University	Wildcats	Utah	Wildcat Softball Field	Kristin Delahoussaye	Big Sky	1973, 1974, 1975	None
Charleston Southern University	Buccaneers	South Carolina	CSU Softball Field	Christi Musser	Big South	None	None
Gardner-Webb University	Runnin' Bulldogs	North Carolina	Brinkley Softball Stadium	Bailey Wigness	Big South	None	None
Longwood University	Lancers	Virginia	Lancer Field	Megan Brown	Big South	None	None
Presbyterian College	Blue Hose	South Carolina	Presbyterian College Softball Complex	David Williams	Big South	None	None
Radford University	Highlanders	Virginia	Radford University Softball Field	Kevin Fagan	Big South	None	None
University of South Carolina Upstate (USC Upstate)	Spartans	South Carolina	Cyrill Softball Stadium	Chris Hawkins	Big South	None	None
Winthrop University	Eagles	South Carolina	Terry Field	Kendall Fuller	Big South	None	None
University of Illinois Urbana–Champaign (Illinois)	Fighting Illini	Illinois	Eichelberger Field	Jenna Hall	Big Ten	None	None
Indiana University Bloomington (Indiana)	Hoosiers	Indiana	Andy Mohr Field	Shonda Stanton	Big Ten	1979, 1980, 1983, 1986	None
University of Iowa	Hawkeyes	Iowa	Bob Pearl Softball Field	Stacy May-Johnson	Big Ten	1995, 1996, 1997, 2001	None
University of Maryland, College Park (Maryland)	Terrapins	Maryland	Robert E. Taylor Stadium	Lauren Karn	Big Ten	None	None
University of Michigan	Wolverines	Michigan	Carol Hutchins Stadium	Bonnie Tholl	Big Ten	1982 (AIAW), 1995, 1996, 1997, 1998, 2001, 2002, 2004, 2005, 2009, 2013, 2015, 2016	2005
Michigan State University	Spartans	Michigan	Secchia Stadium	Sharonda McDonald-Kelley	Big Ten	1973, 1974, 1975, 1976, 1977, 1981	1976
University of Minnesota	Golden Gophers	Minnesota	Jane Sage Cowles Stadium	Gretta Melsted	Big Ten	1976, 1978, 2019	None
University of Nebraska–Lincoln (Nebraska)	Cornhuskers	Nebraska	Bowlin Stadium	Rhonda Revelle	Big Ten	1970, 1971, 1982 (NCAA), 1984, 1985, 1987, 1988, 1998, 2002, 2013	None
Northwestern University	Wildcats	Illinois	Sharon J. Drysdale Field	Kate Drohan	Big Ten	1984, 1985, 1986, 2006, 2007, 2022	None
Ohio State University	Buckeyes	Ohio	Buckeye Field	Kirin Kumar	Big Ten	1982 (AIAW)	None
University of Oregon	Ducks	Oregon	Jane Sanders Stadium	Melyssa Lombardi	Big Ten	1976, 1980, 1989, 2012, 2014, 2015, 2017, 2018, 2025	None
Pennsylvania State University (Penn State)	Nittany Lions	Pennsylvania	Beard Field	Clarisa Crowell	Big Ten	None	None
Purdue University	Boilermakers	Indiana	Bittinger Stadium	Magali Frezzotti	Big Ten	1972	None
Rutgers University–New Brunswick (Rutgers)	Scarlet Knights	New Jersey	Rutgers Softball Complex	Kristen Butler	Big Ten	1979, 1981	None
University of California, Los Angeles (UCLA)	Bruins	California	Easton Stadium	Kelly Inouye-Perez	Big Ten	1978, 1979, 1981, 1982 (NCAA), 1983, 1984, 1985, 1987, 1988, 1989, 1990, 1991, 1992, 1993, 1994, 1995, 1996, 1997, 1999, 2000, 2001, 2002, 2003, 2004, 2005, 2006, 2008, 2010, 2015, 2016, 2017, 2018, 2019, 2021, 2022, 2024, 2025	1978, 1982 (NCAA), 1984, 1985, 1988, 1989, 1990, 1992, 1995, (Note: The 1995 title by UCLA and any related records have been vacated by the NCAA due to scholarship violations. Criticism also centered on UCLA player Tanya Harding who was recruited from Queensland, Australia, midway through the 1995 season. After UCLA captured the NCAA National Championship, Harding, the MVP of the tournament, returned to her homeland without taking final exams or earning a single college credit. Despite not violating any formal rules in recruiting Harding, the incident generated heated criticism that some foreign athletes were little more than hired guns.) 1999, 2003, 2004, 2010, 2019
University of Washington	Huskies	Washington	Husky Softball Stadium	Heather Tarr	Big Ten	1996, 1997, 1998, 1999, 2000, 2003, 2004, 2007, 2009, 2010, 2013, 2017, 2018, 2019, 2023	2009
University of Wisconsin–Madison (Wisconsin)	Badgers	Wisconsin	Goodman Softball Complex	Yvette Healy	Big Ten	None	None
University of Arizona	Wildcats	Arizona	Rita Hillenbrand Memorial Stadium	Caitlin Lowe	Big 12	1974, 1975, 1977, 1979, 1988, 1989, 1990, 1991, 1992, 1993, 1994, 1995, 1996, 1997, 1998, 1999, 2000, 2001, 2002, 2003, 2005, 2006, 2007, 2008, 2009, 2010, 2019, 2021, 2022	1991, 1993, 1994, 1996, 1997, 2001, 2006, 2007
Arizona State University	Sun Devils	Arizona	Alberta B. Farrington Softball Stadium	Megan Bartlett	Big 12	1971, 1972, 1973, 1976, 1977, 1978, 1979, 1982 (NCAA), 1987, 1999, 2002, 2006, 2007, 2008, 2009, 2011, 2012, 2013, 2018	1972, 1973, 2008, 2011
Baylor University	Bears	Texas	Getterman Stadium	Glenn Moore	Big 12	2007, 2011, 2014, 2017	None
Brigham Young University (BYU)	Cougars	Utah	Gail Miller Field at Miller Park	Gordon Eakin	Big 12	None	None
University of Houston	Cougars	Texas	Cougar Softball Stadium	Chrissy Schoonmaker	Big 12	None	None
Iowa State University	Cyclones	Iowa	Cyclone Sports Complex	Jamie Pinkerton	Big 12	1971, 1973	None
University of Kansas	Jayhawks	Kansas	Arrocha Ballpark	Jennifer McFalls	Big 12	1973, 1974, 1975, 1976, 1977, 1979, 1992	None
Oklahoma State University–Stillwater (Oklahoma State)	Cowgirls	Oklahoma	Cowgirl Stadium	Kenny Gajewski	Big 12	1977, 1980, 1981, 1982 (AIAW), 1982 (NCAA), 1989, 1990, 1993, 1994, 1998, 2011, 2019, 2021, 2022, 2023, 2024	None
Texas Tech University	Red Raiders	Texas	Rocky Johnson Field	Gerry Glasco	Big 12	2025	None
University of Central Florida (UCF)	Knights	Florida	UCF Softball Complex	Cindy Ball-Malone	Big 12	None	None
University of Utah	Utes	Utah	Dumke Family Softball Stadium	Amy Hogue	Big 12	1976, 1982 (AIAW), 1985, 1991, 1994, 2023	None
California Polytechnic State University (Cal Poly)	Mustangs	California	Bob Janssen Field	Jenny Condon	Big West	None	None
California State University, Fullerton (Cal State Fullerton)	Titans	California	Anderson Family Field	Gina Oaks Garcia	Big West	1980, 1981, 1982 (NCAA), 1983, 1985, 1986, 1987, 1995	1986
California State University, Northridge (Cal State Northridge or CSUN)	Matadors	California	Matador Diamond	Jodie Cox (interim)	Big West	1993, 1994	None
California Baptist University	Lancers	California	John C. Funk Stadium	Brandon Telesco	Big West	None	None
California State University, Bakersfield (Bakersfield or CSU Bakersfield)	Roadrunners	California	Roadrunner Softball Complex	Letty Olivarez	Big West	None	None
California State University, Long Beach (Long Beach State)	The Beach	California	LBSU Softball Complex	Kendall Fearn	Big West	1986, 1990, 1991, 1992, 1993	None
California State University, Sacramento (Sacramento State)	Hornets	California	Shea Stadium	Lori Perez	Big West	1976, 1977	None
University of California, Riverside (UC Riverside)	Highlanders	California	Amy S. Harrison Field	Brittany Matta	Big West	None	None
University of California, San Diego (UC San Diego)	Tritons	California	Triton Softball Field	Nikki Palmer	Big West (Note: UC San Diego joins, and UC Santa Barbara rejoins, the West Coast Conference in 2027 (2028 season).)	None	2003 (D-II)
University of California, Santa Barbara (UC Santa Barbara)	Gauchos	California	UCSB Campus Diamond	Jo Evans	Big West	None	None
Utah Valley University	Wolverines	Utah	Wolverine Field	Cody Thomson	Big West	None	None
Campbell University	Fighting Camels	North Carolina	Amanda Littlejohn Stadium	Emily Carosone	CAA	None	None
College of Charleston (Charleston)	Cougars	South Carolina	Patriots Point Athletics Complex	Maggie Mirowka	CAA	None	None
Drexel University	Dragons	Pennsylvania	Drexel Softball Field	Brooke Kalman	CAA	None	None
Elon University	Phoenix	North Carolina	Hunt Softball Park	Kathy Bocock	CAA	None	None
Hampton University	Lady Pirates	Virginia	Lady Pirates Softball Stadium	Cat Tarvin	CAA	None	None
Hofstra University	Pride	New York	Bill Edwards Stadium	Adrienne Clark	CAA	None	None
Monmouth University	Hawks	New Jersey	Monmouth University Softball Park	Morgan Royer	CAA	None	None
North Carolina Agricultural & Technical State University (North Carolina A&T)	Aggies	North Carolina	Aggie Softball Complex	Jose Gonzalez Jr.	CAA	None	None
Stony Brook University	Seawolves	New York	University Field	Megan Bryant	CAA	None	None
Towson University	Tigers	Maryland	Tiger Softball Complex	Daniel Stockdale	CAA	None	None
University of North Carolina Wilmington (UNC Wilmington or UNCW)	Seahawks	North Carolina	Boseman Field	Ashley Wade	CAA	None	None
University of Delaware	Fightin' Blue Hens	Delaware	Delaware Softball Stadium	Jennifer Steele	Conference USA	None	None
Florida International University (FIU)	Panthers	Florida	Felsberg Field at FIU Softball Complex	Olivia Watkins	Conference USA	None	None
Jacksonville State University	Gamecocks	Alabama	University Field	Julie Boland	Conference USA	None	None
Kennesaw State University	Owls	Georgia	Bailey Park	Selena Collins-Patterson	Conference USA	None	None
Liberty University	Lady Flames	Virginia	Kamphuis Field at Liberty Softball Stadium	Dot Richardson	Conference USA	None	None
Middle Tennessee State University (Middle Tennessee or MTSU)	Blue Raiders	Tennessee	Blue Raider Softball Field	Jeff Breeden	Conference USA	None	None
Missouri State University	Lady Bears	Missouri	Killian Stadium	Kasey Griffith	Conference USA	1969, 1970, 1971, 1972, 1973, 1974, 1977, 1978, 1980, 1982 (AIAW)	1974
New Mexico State University	Aggies	New Mexico	NMSU Softball Complex	Benet Higgs (interim)	Conference USA	1981	None
Sam Houston State University (Sam Houston)	Bearkats	Texas	Bearkat Softball Complex	Garrett Valis	Conference USA	None	None
Western Kentucky University	Lady Toppers	Kentucky	WKU Softball Complex	Amy Tudor	Conference USA	None	None
University of Detroit Mercy	Titans	Michigan	Buysse Ballpark	Dan Vitale	Horizon League	None	None
University of Wisconsin–Green Bay (Green Bay)	Phoenix	Wisconsin	King Park	Sara Kubuske	Horizon League	None	None
Indiana University Indianapolis (IU Indy)	Jaguars	Indiana	IU Indy Softball Complex	Elisabeth Beirne	Horizon League	None	None
Northern Illinois University (NIU)	Huskies	Illinois	Mary M. Bell Field	Kathryn Gleason	Horizon League	None	
Northern Kentucky University	Norse	Kentucky	Frank Ignatius Grein Softball Field	Morgan Gerak	Horizon League	None	None
Oakland University	Golden Grizzlies	Michigan	Oakland University Softball Field	Chris Stelma	Horizon League	None	None
Robert Morris University	Colonials	Pennsylvania	North Athletic Complex	Jexx Varner	Horizon League	None	None
Youngstown State University	Penguins	Ohio	YSU Softball Complex	Erin Pond	Horizon League	None	None
Brown University	Bears	Rhode Island	Brown Softball Field	Mary Holt-Kelsch	Ivy League	None	None
Columbia University	Lions	New York	Columbia Softball Field	Jen Teague	Ivy League	None	None
Cornell University	Big Red	New York	Niemand–Robison Softball Field	Tara Smith	Ivy League	None	None
Dartmouth College	Big Green	New Hampshire	Dartmouth Softball Park	Jennifer Williams	Ivy League	None	None
Harvard University	Crimson	Massachusetts	Soldiers Softball Field	Jenny Rohn	Ivy League	None	None
University of Pennsylvania (Penn)	Quakers	Pennsylvania	Penn Park	Christie Novatin	Ivy League	None	None
Princeton University	Tigers	New Jersey	Cynthia Lynn Paul '94 Field	Lisa Van Ackeren	Ivy League	1995, 1996	None
Yale University	Bulldogs	Connecticut	DeWitt Family Field	Laura Ricciardone	Ivy League	None	None
Canisius University	Golden Griffins	New York	Demske Sports Complex	Joe Gierlak	Metro	None	None
Fairfield University	Stags	Connecticut	Alumni Softball Field	Julie Brzezinski	Metro (Note: Fairfield joins the Coastal Athletic Association in 2027 (2028 season).)	None	None
Iona University	Gaels	New York	Rice Oval Field	Carla Campagna	Metro	None	None
Manhattan University	Lady Jaspers	New York	Gaelic Park	Bridget Hurlman	Metro	None	None
Marist University	Red Foxes	New York	Softball Park at Gartland Athletic Field	Joe Ausanio	Metro	None	None
Merrimack College	Warriors	Massachusetts	Martone–Mejail Field	Jill Gagnon	Metro	None	None
Mount St. Mary's University	Mountaineers	Maryland	Our Lady of the Meadows Field	Anna Nagro	Metro	None	None
Niagara University	Purple Eagles	New York	Niagara Softball Field	Craig Leone	Metro	None	None
Quinnipiac University	Bobcats	Connecticut	Quinnipiac Softball Field	Hillary Smith	Metro	None	None
Rider University	Broncs	New Jersey	Herb and Joan Young Field	Davon Ortega	Metro	None	None
Sacred Heart University	Pioneers	Connecticut	Pioneer Park	Pam London	Metro	None	None
Saint Peter's University	Peacocks	New Jersey	Joseph J. Jaroschak Field	Alyssa Ruiz	Metro	None	None
Siena University	Saints	New York	Siena Softball Field	Casey Bump	Metro	None	None
University of Akron	Zips	Ohio	Lee R. Jackson Softball Field	Craig Nicholson	Mid-American	None	None
Ball State University	Cardinals	Indiana	BSU Softball Complex	Helen Peña	Mid-American	1973, 1975	None
Bowling Green State University (Bowling Green)	Falcons	Ohio	Meserve Field	Michelle Gardner	Mid-American	None	None
University at Buffalo	Bulls	New York	Nan Harvey Field	Chelsea Plimpton	Mid-American	None	None
Central Michigan University	Chippewas	Michigan	Margo Jonker Stadium	McCall Salmon	Mid-American	1982 (AIAW), 1987	None
Kent State University	Golden Flashes	Ohio	Devine Diamond	Jessica O'Donnell	Mid-American	1990	None
Miami University (Miami (Ohio))	RedHawks	Ohio	Miami Softball Stadium	Mandy Gardner-Colegate	Mid-American	None	None
Ohio University	Bobcats	Ohio	Ohio Softball Field	Paige McMenemy	Mid-American	1975	None
University of Toledo	Rockets	Ohio	Scott Park Softball Complex	Jessica Bracamonte	Mid-American	1989	None
University of Massachusetts Amherst (UMass)	Minutewomen	Massachusetts	UMass Softball Complex	Danielle Henderson	Mid-American	1974, 1978, 1980, 1992, 1997, 1998	None
Western Michigan University	Broncos	Michigan	Ebert Field	Marlee Wilson	Mid-American	1980, 1981, 1982 (NCAA)	None
Coppin State University	Eagles	Maryland	Coppin State Softball Complex	Mercedes Hargett	MEAC	None	None
Delaware State University	Hornets	Delaware	The Hornets Nest	Vacant	MEAC	None	None
Howard University	Lady Bison	Washington, D.C.	Banneker Field	Tori Tyson	MEAC	None	None
University of Maryland Eastern Shore (UMES)	Hawks	Maryland	Hawk Field	Aaron Robinson	MEAC	None	None
Morgan State University	Lady Bears	Maryland	Lois T. Murray Field	Melisa Shock	MEAC	None	None
Norfolk State University	Spartans	Virginia	NSU Softball Field	Tatjana Matthews	MEAC	None	None
North Carolina Central University	Eagles	North Carolina	Parkwood Athletic Field	Now–Allah James	MEAC	None	None
South Carolina State University	Lady Bulldogs	South Carolina	Lady Bulldog Softball Field	Nakeya Hall	MEAC	None	None
Belmont University	Bruins	Tennessee	E. S. Rose Park	Laura Matthews	Missouri Valley	None	None
Bradley University	Braves	Illinois	Laura Bradley Park	Lynn Anderson	Missouri Valley	None	None
Drake University	Bulldogs	Iowa	Ron Buel Field	Lindsay Diehl	Missouri Valley	None	None
University of Evansville	Purple Aces	Indiana	James and Dorothy Cooper Stadium	Bailey Dillender	Missouri Valley	None	None
Illinois State University	Redbirds	Illinois	Marian Kneer Softball Stadium	Tina Kramos	Missouri Valley	1969, 1970, 1971, 1972, 1973, 1976, 1978, 1981	None
Indiana State University	Sycamores	Indiana	Eleanor Forsythe St. John Softball Complex	Windy Thees	Missouri Valley	1974, 1976	None
Murray State University	Racers	Kentucky	Racer Field	Kara Amundson	Missouri Valley	None	None
University of Northern Iowa	Panthers	Iowa	Robinson-Dresser Sports Complex, UNI-Dome	Ryan Jacobs	Missouri Valley	1973, 1975, 1976, 1977	1977
Southern Illinois University Carbondale (Southern Illinois)	Salukis	Illinois	Charlotte West Stadium	Jen Sewell	Missouri Valley	1970, 1971, 1977, 1978	None
University of Illinois Chicago (UIC)	Flames	Illinois	Flames Field (Note: Not to be confused with UIC's soccer venue, also called Flames Field. The two venues have different street addresses on Chicago's Roosevelt Road, with the softball park at 839 West and the soccer stadium at 901 West.)	Megan Coronado	Missouri Valley	1994	None
Valparaiso University	Beacons	Indiana	Valparaiso University Softball Field	Mike Armitage	Missouri Valley	None	None
Grand Canyon University	Antelopes	Arizona	GCU Softball Stadium	Shanon Hays	Mountain West	None	None
University of Hawaiʻi at Mānoa (Hawaii)	Rainbow Wahine	Hawaii	Rainbow Wahine Softball Stadium	Panita Thanatharn	Mountain West	2010	None
University of Nevada, Reno (Nevada)	Wolf Pack	Nevada	Christina M. Hixson Softball Park	Victoria Hayward	Mountain West	None	None
University of New Mexico	Lobos	New Mexico	Lobo Softball Field	Nicole Dickson	Mountain West	1980, 1981	None
San Jose State University	Spartans	California	Mission College Sports Complex	Tammy Lohmann	Mountain West	None	None
University of California, Davis (UC Davis)	Aggies	California	La Rue Field	Vacant	Mountain West	None	None
University of Nevada, Las Vegas (UNLV)	Rebels	Nevada	Eller Media Stadium	Kristie Fox	Mountain West	1990, 1991, 1995	None
University of Texas at El Paso (UTEP)	Miners	Texas	Helen of Troy Softball Complex	T. J. Hubbard	Mountain West	None	None
Central Connecticut State University	Blue Devils	Connecticut	CCSU Softball Field	Breanne Gleason	Northeast	None	None
Fairleigh Dickinson University	Knights	New Jersey	FDU Softball Field	Chris Foye	Northeast	None	None
Le Moyne College	Dolphins	New York	Softball Complex	Tracey Roman	Northeast	None	None
Long Island University (LIU) (Note: After the 2018–19 school year, Long Island University merged the Division I athletic program of its Brooklyn campus with the Division II athletic program of its Post campus, creating a single Division I program that now competes as the LIU Sharks.)	Sharks	New York	LIU Softball Complex (Note: LIU bases its unified softball program at the Brooklyn campus.)	Rich Calvert	Northeast (Note: The unified LIU athletic program inherited the Northeast Conference membership of the Brooklyn campus.)	None	None
Mercyhurst University	Lakers	Pennsylvania	Mercyhurst Softball Field	Leanne Baker	Northeast	None	None
University of New Haven	Chargers	Connecticut	New Haven Softball Field	Kelly Paterson	Northeast	None	None
Stonehill College	Skyhawks	Massachusetts	Father Garland Field	Ali Maloof	Northeast	None	None
Wagner College	Seahawks	New York	Wagner College Softball Field	Glenn Moore	Northeast	None	None
Eastern Illinois University	Panthers	Illinois	Williams Field	Kristi Paulson	Ohio Valley	1971, 1974	None
Lindenwood University	Lions	Missouri	Lou Brock Sports Complex	Erin Brown	Ohio Valley	None	None
Morehead State University	Eagles	Kentucky	University Field	Megan Griffith	Ohio Valley	None	None
Southeast Missouri State University (Southeast Missouri or SEMO)	Redhawks	Missouri	Southeast Softball Complex	Mark Redburn	Ohio Valley	None	None
Southern Illinois University Edwardsville (SIU Edwardsville or SIUE)	Cougars	Illinois	Cougar Field	Ben Sorden	Ohio Valley	None	None
University of Southern Indiana	Screaming Eagles	Indiana	USI Softball Field	Sue Kunkle	Ohio Valley	None	2018 (D-II)
University of Tennessee at Martin (Tennessee–Martin or UT Martin)	Skyhawks	Tennessee	Bettye Giles Field	Chelsea Farmer	Ohio Valley	None	None
Tennessee State University	Lady Tigers	Tennessee	Tiger Field	Genee McRath	Ohio Valley	None	None
Western Illinois University	Leathernecks	Illinois	Mary Ellen McKee Softball Stadium	Vacant	Ohio Valley	1970, 1972, 1973, 1975, 1977, 1979, 1980, 1982 (AIAW)	None
Colorado State University	Rams	Colorado	Ram Field	Michelle Gascoigne	Pac-12	None	None
California State University, Fresno (Fresno State)	Bulldogs	California	Margie Wright Diamond	Charlotte Morgan	Pac-12	1982 (NCAA), 1984, 1987, 1988, 1989, 1990, 1991, 1992, 1994, 1997, 1998, 1999	1998
Boise State University	Broncos	Idaho	Dona Larsen Park	Andrew Rich	Pac-12	None	None
Oregon State University	Beavers	Oregon	OSU Softball Complex	Laura Berg	Pac-12	1977, 1978, 1979, 2006, 2022	None
San Diego State University	Aztecs	California	SDSU Softball Stadium	Stacey Nuveman Deniz	Pac-12	None	None
Texas State University	Bobcats	Texas	Bobcat Softball Stadium	Ricci Woodard	Pac-12	None	None
Utah State University	Aggies	Utah	LaRee and LeGrand Johnson Field	Kristen Zeleski	Pac-12	1978, 1980, 1981, 1984	1980, 1981
United States Military Academy (Army or Army West Point)	Black Knights	New York	Army Softball Complex	Jen Consaul	Patriot League	None	None
Boston University (BU)	Terriers	Massachusetts	BU Softball Field	Ashley Waters	Patriot League	None	None
Bucknell University	Bison	Pennsylvania	Becker Field	Angie Stackhouse	Patriot League	None	None
Colgate University	Raiders	New York	Eaton Street Softball Complex	Marissa Lamison-Myers	Patriot League	None	None
College of the Holy Cross	Crusaders	Massachusetts	Freshman Field	Joe Ladino	Patriot League	None	None
Lafayette College	Leopards	Pennsylvania	Lafayette Softball Field	Kelliner Croushore	Patriot League	None	None
Lehigh University	Mountain Hawks	Pennsylvania	Leadership Park	Fran Troyan	Patriot League	None	None
University of Alabama	Crimson Tide	Alabama	Rhoads Stadium	Patrick Murphy	SEC	2000, 2003, 2005, 2006, 2008, 2009, 2011, 2012, 2014, 2015, 2016, 2019, 2021, 2023, 2024	2012
University of Arkansas	Razorbacks	Arkansas	Bogle Park	Courtney Deifel	SEC	None	None
Auburn University	Tigers	Alabama	Jane B. Moore Field	Chris Malveaux & Kate Malveaux	SEC	2015, 2016	None
University of Florida	Gators	Florida	Katie Seashole Pressly Softball Stadium	Tim Walton	SEC	2008, 2009, 2010, 2011, 2013, 2014, 2015, 2017, 2018, 2019, 2022, 2024, 2025	2014, 2015
University of Georgia	Bulldogs	Georgia	Jack Turner Stadium	Tony Baldwin	SEC	2009, 2010, 2016, 2018, 2021	None
University of Kentucky	Wildcats	Kentucky	John Cropp Stadium	Rachel Lawson	SEC	2014	None
Louisiana State University (LSU)	Tigers	Louisiana	Tiger Park	Beth Torina	SEC	2001, 2004, 2012, 2015, 2016, 2017	None
Mississippi State University	Bulldogs	Mississippi	Nusz Park	Samantha Ricketts	SEC	None	None
University of Missouri (alternately Mizzou)	Tigers	Missouri	Mizzou Softball Stadium	Larissa Anderson	SEC	1981, 1983, 1991, 1994, 2009, 2010, 2011	None
University of Oklahoma	Sooners	Oklahoma	Love's Field	Patty Gasso	SEC	1975, 1980, 1981, 1982 (AIAW), 2000, 2001, 2002, 2003, 2004, 2011, 2012, 2013, 2014, 2016, 2017, 2018, 2019, 2021, 2022, 2023, 2024	2000, 2013, 2016, 2017, 2021, 2022, 2023, 2024
University of Mississippi (Ole Miss)	Rebels	Mississippi	Ole Miss Softball Complex	Jamie Trachsel	SEC	2025	None
University of South Carolina	Gamecocks	South Carolina	Carolina Softball Stadium	Ashley Chastain	SEC	1972, 1973, 1974, 1976, 1978, 1979, 1980, 1981, 1983, 1989, 1997	None
University of Tennessee	Lady Volunteers	Tennessee	Sherri Parker Lee Stadium	Karen Weekly	SEC	2005, 2006, 2007, 2010, 2012, 2013, 2015, 2023, 2025	None
University of Texas at Austin (Texas)	Longhorns	Texas	Red and Charline McCombs Field	Mike White	SEC	1998, 2003, 2005, 2006, 2013, 2022, 2024, 2025	2025
Texas A&M University	Aggies	Texas	Davis Diamond	Trisha Ford	SEC	1979, 1980, 1981, 1982 (AIAW), 1983, 1984, 1986, 1987, 1988, 2007, 2008, 2017	1982 (AIAW), 1983, 1987
University of Tennessee at Chattanooga (Chattanooga)	Mocs	Tennessee	Jim Frost Stadium	Frank Reed	Southern	None	None
East Tennessee State University (East Tennessee or ETSU)	Buccaneers	Tennessee	Betty Basler Field	Cheryl Milligan	Southern	None	None
Furman University	Paladins	South Carolina	Pepsi Softball Stadium	Mary Beth Dennison	Southern	None	None
Mercer University	Bears	Georgia	Sikes Field	Chris Kuhlmeyer	Southern	None	None
University of North Carolina at Greensboro (UNC Greensboro or UNCG)	Spartans	North Carolina	UNCG Softball Stadium	Janelle Breneman	Southern	None	None
Samford University	Bulldogs	Alabama	Bulldog Softball Field	Megan Curry	Southern	None	None
Tennessee Tech University	Golden Eagles	Tennessee	Tennessee Tech Softball Field	Danielle Penner	Southern	None	None
Western Carolina University	Catamounts	North Carolina	Catamount Softball Complex	Jim Clift	Southern	None	None
Wofford College	Terriers	South Carolina	Hope Field	Chelsea Butler	Southern	None	None
East Texas A&M University	Lions	Texas	John Cain Family Softball Complex	Rodney DeLong	Southland	None	None
Houston Christian University	Huskies	Texas	Husky Field	Bert Emanuel	Southland	None	None
University of the Incarnate Word (alternately UIW)	Cardinals	Texas	H-E-B Field	Kim Dean	Southland	None	None
Lamar University	Lady Cardinals	Texas	Lamar Softball Complex	Amy Hooks	Southland	None	None
McNeese State University (McNeese)	Cowgirls	Louisiana	Joe Miller Field at Cowgirl Diamond	James Landreneau	Southland	None	None
Nicholls State University (Nicholls)	Colonels	Louisiana	Swanner Field at Geo Surfaces Park	Ron Frost	Southland	None	None
Northwestern State University	Lady Demons	Louisiana	Lady Demon Diamond	Jason Anderson	Southland	None	None
Southeastern Louisiana University	Lions	Louisiana	North Oak Park	Rick Fremin	Southland	None	None
Stephen F. Austin State University	Ladyjacks	Texas	SFA Softball Field	Jeff Jackson	Southland	1978	None
Texas A&M University-Corpus Christi	Islanders	Texas	Chapman Field	Mark Montgomery	Southland	None	None
Alabama Agricultural and Mechanical University (Alabama A&M)	Lady Bulldogs	Alabama	Bulldog Field	Brian Daley	SWAC	None	None
Alabama State University	Lady Hornets	Alabama	Barbara Williams Softball Complex	Camise Patterson	SWAC	None	None
Alcorn State University	Lady Braves	Mississippi	ASU Softball Park	Brianna Billie	SWAC	None	None
University of Arkansas at Pine Bluff	Golden Lions	Arkansas	Torii Hunter Baseball/Softball Complex	Michael Bumpers	SWAC	None	None
Bethune–Cookman University	Wildcats	Florida	Sunnyland Park	Laura Watten	SWAC	None	None
Florida Agricultural and Mechanical University (Florida A&M)	Lady Rattlers	Florida	Veronica Wiggins Field at University Softball Complex	Brittany Beall	SWAC	None	None
Grambling State University	Lady Tigers	Louisiana	GSU Softball Complex	Jessica Hurtado	SWAC	None	None
Jackson State University	Lady Tigers	Mississippi	Jackson State University Softball Stadium	Kevin Montgomery	SWAC	None	None
Mississippi Valley State University	Devilettes	Mississippi	MVSU Softball Field	Jimmy Buckner	SWAC	None	None
Prairie View A&M University	Lady Panthers	Texas	Lady Panther Softball Complex	Vernon Bland	SWAC	None	None
Southern University	Lady Jaguars	Louisiana	Lady Jaguar Field	Brittney Williams	SWAC	None	None
Texas Southern University	Tigers	Texas	Memorial Park	Raven Rodriguez	SWAC	None	None
University of Missouri–Kansas City (Kansas City)	Roos	Missouri	Missouri 3&2 Complex	Kiki Stokes O'Connor	The Summit	None	None
University of North Dakota	Fighting Hawks	North Dakota	Apollo Sports Complex	Jordan Stevens	The Summit	None	None
North Dakota State University	Bison	North Dakota	Ellig Sports Complex	Darren Mueller	The Summit	1973, 1974, 1975	None
University of Nebraska Omaha (Omaha)	Mavericks	Nebraska	Westside Field at Westbrook	Mike Heard	The Summit	1969, 1970, 1971, 1972, 1973, 1975, 1976, 1977, 1978, 1979	1975
University of St. Thomas	Tommies	Minnesota	South Field Softball Complex	Jennifer Bagley Trotter	The Summit	None	2004, 2005 (D-III)
University of South Dakota	Coyotes	South Dakota	Nygaard Field	Shannon Pivovar	The Summit	1971	None
South Dakota State University	Jackrabbits	South Dakota	Jackrabbit Softball Stadium	Kristina McSweeney	The Summit	1971, 1972, 1973, 1974	None
Appalachian State University	Mountaineers	North Carolina	Sywassink/Lloyd Family Stadium	Whitney Jones	Sun Belt	None	None
Coastal Carolina University	Chanticleers	South Carolina	St. John Stadium	Kelley Green	Sun Belt	None	None
Georgia Southern University	Eagles	Georgia	Eagle Field at the GSU Softball Complex	Sharon Perkins	Sun Belt	None	None
Georgia State University	Panthers	Georgia	Robert E. Heck Softball Complex	Becca Mueller	Sun Belt	None	None
James Madison University	Dukes	Virginia	Bank of the James Field at Veterans Memorial Park	Loren LaPorte	Sun Belt	2021	None
University of Louisiana at Lafayette (Louisiana)	Ragin' Cajuns	Louisiana	Yvette Girouard Field at Lamson Park	Alyson Habetz	Sun Belt	1993, 1995, 1996, 2003, 2008, 2014	None
University of Louisiana at Monroe (Louisiana–Monroe or ULM)	Warhawks	Louisiana	Geo-Surfaces Field at the ULM Softball Complex	Molly Fichtner	Sun Belt	None	None
Louisiana Tech University	Lady Techsters	Louisiana	Dr. Billy Bundrick Field	Josh Taylor	Sun Belt	1983, 1985, 1986	None
Marshall University	Thundering Herd	West Virginia	Dot Hicks Field	Morgan Zerkle	Sun Belt	None	None
University of South Alabama	Jaguars	Alabama	Jaguar Field	Becky Clark	Sun Belt	None	None
University of Southern Mississippi (Southern Miss)	Golden Eagles	Mississippi	Southern Miss Softball Complex	Natalie Poole	Sun Belt	1999, 2000	None
Troy University	Trojans	Alabama	Troy Softball Complex	Eric Newell	Sun Belt	None	None
Abilene Christian University	Wildcats	Texas	Poly Wells Field	Jo Koons	United Athletic	None	None
Austin Peay State University (Austin Peay)	Governors	Tennessee	Cathi Maynard Park	Kassie Stanfill	United Athletic	None	None
University of Central Arkansas	Sugar Bears	Arkansas	Farris Field	Kayla Lucas	United Athletic	None	None
Eastern Kentucky University	Colonels	Kentucky	Gertrude Hood Field	Jane Worthington	United Athletic	None	None
University of North Alabama	Lions	Alabama	UNA Softball Complex	Ashley Cozart	United Athletic	None	None
Tarleton State University	Texans	Texas	Tarleton Softball Complex	Mark Cumpian	United Athletic	None	None
University of Texas at Arlington (UT Arlington)	Mavericks	Texas	Allan Saxe Field	Kara Dill	United Athletic	1976, 1977	None
University of West Georgia	Wolves	Georgia	University Softball Field	Kristy Burton	United Athletic	None	1974 (D-II)
Loyola Marymount University	Lions	California	Smith Field	Tairia Flowers	West Coast	None	None
University of the Pacific	Tigers	California	Bill Simoni Field	Samantha Duran-Kukuk	West Coast	1983	None
Saint Mary's College of California	Gaels	California	Cottrell Field	Sonja Garnett	West Coast	None	None
University of San Diego	Toreros	California	USD Softball Complex	MJ Knighten	West Coast	None	None
Santa Clara University	Broncos	California	SCU Softball Field	Gina Carbonatto	West Coast	None	None
Seattle University	Redhawks	Washington	Logan Field	Geoff Hirai	West Coast	None	None

== See also ==
- List of NCAA Division II softball programs
- List of NCAA Division III softball programs
- List of junior college softball programs
- List of NCAA Division I baseball programs
