= 2020 Big 12 Conference softball tournament =

- Finals site: ASA Hall of Fame Stadium; Oklahoma City, OK

2020 Big 12 Conference softball standings
	Conf.				Overall
Team	W		L	PCT	W		L	PCT
No. 3 Texas ‍‍‍	0	–	0	–	24	–	3	.889
No. 6 Oklahoma ‍‍‍	0	–	0	–	20	–	4	.833
No. 24 Baylor ‍‍‍	0	–	0	–	19	–	5	.792
No. 13 Oklahoma State ‍‍‍	0	–	0	–	19	–	5	.792
Texas Tech ‍‍‍	0	–	0	–	17	–	9	.654
Kansas ‍‍‍	0	–	0	–	13	–	13	.500
Iowa State ‍‍‍	0	–	0	–	11	–	13	.458
† – Conference champion ‡ – Tournament champion y – Invited to the NCAA tournament As of March 13, 2020; Rankings from NFCA

The 2020 Big 12 Conference softball tournament was scheduled to be held May 8 through May 9, 2020 at ASA Hall of Fame Stadium in Oklahoma City, Oklahoma. The tournament winner would have earned the Big 12 Conference's automatic bid to the 2020 NCAA Division I softball tournament.

On March 12, 2020, the NCAA cancelled all winter and spring sports championships due to the coronavirus pandemic, thus cancelling the tournament.
