= Holy Cross Crusaders softball =

College softball team

- University: College of the Holy Cross
- Head coach: Jon Ladino (2nd season)
- Conference: Patriot League
- Location: Worcester, Massachusetts, US
- Home stadium: Freshman Field (capacity: 500)
- Nickname: Crusaders
- Colors: Royal purple

Conference tournament championships
- 1998

Regular-season conference championships
- 1998, 1999

The Holy Cross Crusaders softball team represents the College of the Holy Cross in NCAA Division I college softball. The team participates in the Patriot League (PL). From 1985 until 1990, the team was a member of the Metro Atlantic Athletic Conference (MAAC). The Crusaders are led by head coach Jon Ladino. The team plays its home games at Freshman Field located on the university's campus.

== History ==
The Crusaders have found minimal success since becoming a Division I program. The program has won the Patriot League regular season title twice, winning the title outright in 1998 and sharing it in a four way tie in 1999. The team won the conference tournament in 1998 after defeating Lehigh by a score of 4-3, their only championship in program history. Because 1998 was the final year before the expansion of the NCAA tournament, the Crusaders did not automatically qualify for the NCAA tournament.

Holy Cross has won several individual awards during their time in the Patriot League. Pitcher Genoa Grosch was named Patriot League Pitcher of the Year in 1996, 1998, and 1999. Grosch, as well as catcher Michelle Fagnant, were named to the Patriot League 1990s All-Decade team. Former coaches Fran Dyson, Bob Neville, and Brian Claypool have each been named Patriot League Coach of the Year during their time with the Crusaders, with Dyson winning in 1995, Neville in 1998 and 2001, and Claypool in 2011.

=== Coaching history ===
Years	Coach	Record	%
1985	Sandy Gentile	6–21	.222
1986	Kathy Feen	5–18	.217
1987–1990	Laura McLain	46–77	.374
1991–1992	Pete Royce	12–61–1	.169
1993–1997	Fran Dyson	62–131–2	.323
1998–2005	Bob Neville	129–219–2	.371
2006–2007	Peter Maneggia	14–74	.159
2008–2016	Brian Claypool	108–305	.262
2017–2021	Jen Lapicki	49–127	.278
2022–2024	Kimberly Stiles	50–100–1	.334
2025–present	Jon Ladino	18–71	.202

== Roster ==
2024 Holy Cross Crusaders roster
Pitchers: 11 – Maya Gallagher – Freshman; 27 – Zoey McDonough – Freshman; 19 – Sophia Roncone – Sophomore; 10 – Avery Toddings – Freshman; 9 – Jena Whipple – Junior; 30 – Megan Yurchick – Senior; Catchers: 6 – Emma Fong – Junior; 4 – Morgan Jensen – Senior	Outfielders: 5 – Jenna Alesandrelli – Sophomore; 23 – Morgan Kane – Sophomore; 24 – Ali Sniegocki – Sophomore; Infielders: 2 – Bailey Bates – Senior; 18 – Anna Brait – Sophomore; 2 – Ava Gambichler – Freshman; 1 – Abbie Gold – Sophomore; 20 – Caroline Higgins – Freshman; 3 – Emma Pietrzak – Freshman; Utility: 13 – Jessica Mott – Senior; 12 – Callie Thibault – Junior

== Season-by-season results ==
Record table
Season	Coach	Overall	Conference	Standing	Postseason
Holy Cross Crusaders (Metro Atlantic Athletic Conference) (1985–1990)
1985	Sandy Gentile	6–21			
1986	Kathy Feen	5–18			
1987	Laura McLain	10–17			
1988	Laura McLain	7–27			
1989	Laura McLain	16–18			
1990	Laura McLain	13–15			
Holy Cross Crusaders (Patriot League) (1991–present)
1991	Pete Royce	10–29–1	4–8	5th	
1992	Pete Royce	2–32	1–11	7th	
1993	Fran Dyson	3–29	3–9	7th	
1994	Fran Dyson	4–32	1–11	7th	
1995	Fran Dyson	17–27	7–5	2nd	
1996	Fran Dyson	21–22–1	4–6	3rd	
1997	Fran Dyson	15–21–1	6–4	3rd	
1998	Bob Neville	31–19–1	15–5	1st	
1999	Bob Neville	24–25	12–8	T–1st	
2000	Bob Neville	9–27–1	4–6	4th	
2001	Bob Neville	16–27	11–9	2nd	
2002	Bob Neville	14–35	8–12	4th	
2003	Bob Neville	15–28	10–10	3rd	
2004	Bob Neville	12–28	5–15	5th	
2005	Bob Neville	8–30	3–16	6th	
2006	Peter Maneggia	9–35	4–16	6th	
2007	Peter Maneggia	5–39	2–18	6th	
2008	Brian Claypool	10–31	5–15	6th	
2009	Brian Claypool	13–34	6–14	6th	
2010	Brian Claypool	14–31	8–12	5th	
2011	Brian Claypool	18–31	10–10	3rd	
2012	Brian Claypool	9–36	4–16	6th	
2013	Brian Claypool	13–31	7–13	5th	
2014	Brian Claypool	12–26	7–11	5th	
2015	Brian Claypool	11–17	9–9	T–4th	
2016	Brian Claypool	8–36	4–14	6th	
2017	Jen Lapicki	13–30	8–10	4th	
2018	Jen Lapicki	12–33	5–13	6th	
2019	Jen Lapicki	14–35	5–13	6th	
2020	Jen Lapicki	2–9	0–0	N/A	Season cut short due to COVID-19 pandemic
2021	Jen Lapicki	8–20	4–16	6th	
2022	Kimberly Stiles	21–29	8–10	2nd	
2023	Kimberly Stiles	15–36–1	2–16	7th	
2024	Kimberly Stiles	14–35	4–14	6th	
2025	Jon Ladino	8–37	1–17	7th	
2026	Jon Ladino	10–34	4–14	7th	
Total:		499–1,204–6 (.294)			
National champion Postseason invitational champion Conference regular season champion Conference regular season and conference tournament champion Division regular season champion Division regular season and conference tournament champion Conference tournament champion

== See also ==
- List of NCAA Division I softball programs
