= Bucknell Bison softball =

College softball team

Bucknell Bison
- University: Bucknell University
- Head coach: Angie Stackhouse (1st season)
- Conference: Patriot League
- Location: Lewisburg, Pennsylvania
- Home stadium: Becker Field (capacity: 800)
- Nickname: Bison
- Colors: Blue and orange

NCAA Tournament appearances
- 2010

Conference tournament championships
- 1997, 2010

Regular-season conference championships
- 1994, 1999

The Bucknell Bison softball team represents Bucknell University in NCAA Division I college softball. The team participates in the Patriot League, having joined in 1991. From 1979 until 1990, the team was a member of the East Coast Conference (ECC). The Bison are currently led by head coach Angie Stackhouse. The team plays its home games at Becker Field located on the university's campus.

== History ==
The Bison have found moderate success since becoming a Division I program. The team has won two Patriot League regular season championships, although both championships, first in 1994 and again in 1999, were as a result of a tie. The program has also won two Patriot League Tournament championships, doing so in 1997 and in 2010, with the latter earing them a berth in the NCAA Division I softball tournament.

After finishing in third place in the Patriot League, the Bison qualified for the Patriot League Tournament as the #3 seed. The team defeated Colgate in the championship game by a score of 6-4, winning the tournament for the first time since 1997 and clinching their first appearance in the NCAA tournament. In the 2010 tournament, the Bison were eliminated after losing to California and Ohio State.

The Bison have won several awards during their time in the Patriot League. The team has won five Patriot League Player of the Year awards, doing so in 1993 with Lisa Fink, 1999 with Jenny Snyder, 2005 with Lauren Wible, 2011 with Alison Ford, and in 2015 with Kristen Zahn. The team has also won the Patriot League Coach of the Year award seven times, doing so in 1994, 1996, and 1999 with Terrie Grieb, 2004 with Janelle Breneman, 2008 with Heather Rakosik, 2015 with Bonnie Skrenta, and 2019 with Joey Lye.

Sarah Caffrey was hired as the program's head coach in 2020.

=== Coaching history ===
Years	Coach	Record	%
1979–1990, 1992–2000	Terrie Grieb	307–324–2	.487
1991	Dale Franquet	28–12–1	.695
2001–2004	Janelle Breneman	56–117–1	.325
2005–2012	Heather Rakosik	141–243–2	.368
2013–2015	Bonnie Skrenta	79–76	.510
2016–2017	Courtnay Foster	50–43	.538
2018–2020	Joey Lye	63–60–1	.512
2021–2025	Sarah Caffrey	72–137–1	.345
2026–present	Angie Stackhouse	9–35–1	.211

== Roster ==
2024 Bucknell Bison roster
Pitchers: 16 – Mea Consentino – Sophomore; 17 – Savannah Jones – Junior; 7 – Madison Roukey – Junior; 12 – Hunter Vestal – Senior; 5 – Sarah Zimmerman – Freshman; Catchers: 8 – Nicole Lioumis – Sophomore; 13 – Angelina Seropian – Sophomore; 11 – Zoie Smith – Senior; Outfielders: 21 – Ava Aguilar – Junior; 4 – Elena Horn – Junior; 9 – Shea Malone – Freshman; 2 – Marissa Rapino – Sophomore; 1 – Haley Speicher – Sophomore	Infielders: 25 – Juliette Basso – Junior; 18 – Noelle Gardon – Senior; 19 – Brooke Popella – Freshman; Utility: 24 – Bridget Haller – Freshman; 3 – Annabella Hawkins – Senior; 14 – MaKenzie Hilling – Junior; 22 – Molly Lawson – Freshman; 6 – Bella Radican – Junior

== Season-by-season results ==
Record table
Season	Coach	Overall	Conference	Standing	Postseason
Bucknell Bison (East Coast Conference) (1979–1990)
1979	Terrie Grieb	8–4			
1980	Terrie Grieb	7–8			
1981	Terrie Grieb	7–10			
1982	Terrie Grieb	6–11			
1983	Terrie Grieb	7–14			
1984	Terrie Grieb	9–9–1	4–2		
1985	Terrie Grieb	10–12	6–6		
1986	Terrie Grieb	12–12	5–7		
1987	Terrie Grieb	10–16–1	4–8		
1988	Terrie Grieb	24–9	7–5		
1989	Terrie Grieb	18–17	6–8		
1990	Terrie Grieb	20–14	9–5		
Bucknell Bison (Patriot League) (1991–present)
1991	Dale Franquet	28–12–1	9–3	2nd	
1992	Terrie Grieb	20–17	7–5	T–3rd	
1993	Terrie Grieb	27–8	8–4	2nd	
1994	Terrie Grieb	17–21	10–2	T–1st	
1995	Terrie Grieb	19–23	7–5	T–2nd	
1996	Terrie Grieb	20–15	7–3	T–2nd	
1997	Terrie Grieb	18–30	6–4	T–2nd	
1998	Terrie Grieb	18–20	12–6	2nd	
1999	Terrie Grieb	19–28	12–8	T–1st	
2000	Terrie Grieb	11–26	2–8	6th	
2001	Janelle Breneman	19–26–2	8–12	5th	
2002	Janelle Breneman	12–32	5–15	5th	
2003	Janelle Breneman	11–33	6–14	5th	
2004	Janelle Breneman	14–26	8–12	4th	
2005	Heather Rakosik	16–22	8–10	4th	
2006	Heather Rakosik	15–37	8–12	5th	
2007	Heather Rakosik	15–33–1	7–12	5th	
2008	Heather Rakosik	23–29	13–7	T–2nd	
2009	Heather Rakosik	19–32	9–11	3rd	
2010	Heather Rakosik	28–20–1	11–9	3rd	NCAA Regionals
2011	Heather Rakosik	14–36	5–15	T–5th	
2012	Heather Rakosik	11–34	5–15	5th	
2013	Bonnie Skrenta	21–30	11–9	3rd	
2014	Bonnie Skrenta	23–26	10–8	3rd	
2015	Bonnie Skrenta	35–20	12–6	2nd	
2016	Courtnay Foster	27–23	11–7	4th	
2017	Courtnay Foster	23–20	6–11	5th	
2018	Joey Lye	27–23–1	13–5	2nd	
2019	Joey Lye	28–24	14–3	2nd	
2020	Joey Lye	8–14	0–0	N/A	Season cut short due to COVID-19 pandemic
2021	Sarah Caffrey	12–18–1	9–14–1	5th	
2022	Sarah Caffrey	7–38	3–15	6th	
2023	Sarah Caffrey	16–30	8–10	4th	
2024	Sarah Caffrey	19–27	9–9	T–3rd	
2025	Sarah Caffrey	18–30	8–10	4th	
2026	Angie Stackhouse	9–35–1	6–12	5th	
Total:		805–1,047–9 (.435)			
National champion Postseason invitational champion Conference regular season champion Conference regular season and conference tournament champion Division regular season champion Division regular season and conference tournament champion Conference tournament champion

== See also ==
- List of NCAA Division I softball programs
