= Lafayette Leopards softball =

College softball team

- 2026
- University: Lafayette College
- Head coach: Kelliner Croushere (2nd season)
- Conference: Patriot League
- Location: Easton, Pennsylvania, US
- Home stadium: Lafayette Softball Field
- Nickname: Leopards
- Colors: Maroon and white

The Lafayette Leopards softball team is what represents Lafayette College in NCAA Division I college softball. The team currently participates in the Patriot League (PL). The team was formerly a member of the East Coast Conference (ECC). The Leopards are currently led by their head coach Kelliner Croushere. The team plays its home games at Lafayette Softball Field which is located on the university's campus.

== History ==
The Leopards have struggled as a program since joining the Patriot League. The team has only one season with a winning record in 34 years, doing so in 2008 after achieving a 27–24 record. Since the team has failed to win games, they have in turn failed a regular season championship as well as failing to win the Patriot League Tournament. Failing to win the latter also means the team has failed to qualify for the NCAA Division I softball tournament.

Lafayette has won several awards during their time in the Patriot League. The team has won three PL Player of the Year awards, winning in 1996 and 1997 with Jen Rothrock, and in 2009 with Christina Giambrone. The team has also won two PL Coach of the Year awards, doing so in 2000 with John Wong and in 2006 with Jeanine Gunther.

Karavin Dew was hired as the Leopards' head coach in August 2022.

=== Coaching history ===
| Years | Coach | Record | % |
|---|---|---|---|
| 1990 | Holly Hughes | N/A | N/A |
| 1991–1992 | Janet Malouf | 9–57–2 | .147 |
| 1993–1994 | Dale Franquet | 9–61–1 | .134 |
| 1995–1999 | Stacey Cagenello | 48–149 | .244 |
| 2000–2005 | John Wong | 46–181 | .203 |
| 2006–2009 | Jeanine Gunther | 85–106 | .445 |
| 2010 | Jaime Wallin | 15–33 | .313 |
| 2011–2012 | Meaghan Asselta | 22–79 | .218 |
| 2013–2017 | Jexx Varner | 51–172 | .229 |
| 2018–2022 | Caitlyn de la Haba | 27–151–1 | .154 |
| 2023–2024 | Karavin Dew | 13–73–1 | .155 |
| 2025–present | Kelliner Croushere | 23–67 | .256 |

== Roster ==
2024 Lafayette Leopards roster
| Pitchers: 24 – Jacqueline Cal – Senior; 11 – Morrigan Gardiner – Junior; 18 – Parker Rowden – Freshman; 34 – Kailee Sawai – Senior; Catchers: 17 – Kaya Ciccone-Cozart – Junior; 26 – Maggie Klug – Junior; 15 – Regan Dillon – Freshman; 12 – Bella Lowdermilk – Senior; Outfielders: 4 – Olivia Catalina – Sophomore; 2 – Grace Hausamann – Sophomore; 23 – Bailey Langford – Senior; 10 – Mary Grace O'Neill – Junior; 14 – Marisa Powell – Sophomore; 8 – Paige Sandidge – Senior | Infielders: 13 – Kristen Brown – Senior; 6 – Megan Coyle – Sophomore; 3 – Kylene Gooch – Sophomore; 1 – Katie Harrington – Freshman; 5 – Sabina Lehnert – Freshman; 16 – Natalia LoCurto – Freshman; 22 – Kylee Sweet – Sophomore |

== Season-by-season results ==
Record table
| Season | Coach | Overall | Conference | Standing | Postseason |
|---|---|---|---|---|---|
Lafayette Leopards (East Coast Conference) (1990–1990)
| 1990 | Holly Hughes | N/A (Note: Results are unavailable for 1990, although newspaper articles indicate a team was fielded in that year with Holly Hughes as head coach.) | N/A | N/A | |
Lafayette Leopards (Patriot League) (1991–present)
| 1991 | Janet Malouf | 5–26–2 | 4–6 | 4th | |
| 1992 | Janet Malouf | 4–31 | 3–9 | 6th | |
| 1993 | Dale Franquet | 4–32 | 3–9 | T–6th | |
| 1994 | Dale Franquet | 5–29–1 | 3–9 | T–5th | |
| 1995 | Stacey Cagenello | 10–33 | 3–8 | T–6th | |
| 1996 | Stacey Cagenello | 14–23 | 3–7 | T–5th | |
| 1997 | Stacey Cagenello | 11–24 | 3–7 | 6th | |
| 1998 | Stacey Cagenello | 7–35 | 2–18 | 6th | |
| 1999 | Stacey Cagenello | 6–34 | 4–16 | 6th | |
| 2000 | John Wong | 6–20 | 4–6 | T–3rd | |
| 2001 | John Wong | 8–33 | 4–16 | 6th | |
| 2002 | John Wong | 6–31 | 2–18 | 6th | |
| 2003 | John Wong | 5–31 | 1–19 | 6th | |
| 2004 | John Wong | 10–32 | 3–17 | 6th | |
| 2005 | John Wong | 11–34 | 3–15 | 5th | |
| 2006 | Jeanine Gunther | 20–28 | 10–10 | T–2nd | |
| 2007 | Jeanine Gunther | 21–25 | 10–10 | 3rd | |
| 2008 | Jeanine Gunther | 27–24 | 13–7 | T–2nd | |
| 2009 | Jeanine Gunther | 17–29 | 8–12 | T–4th | |
| 2010 | Jaime Wallin | 15–33 | 4–16 | 6th | |
| 2011 | Meaghan Asselta | 8–39 | 5–15 | T–5th | |
| 2012 | Meaghan Asselta | 14–40 | 7–13 | 4th | |
| 2013 | Jexx Varner | 11–43 | 4–16 | 6th | |
| 2014 | Jexx Varner | 10–32 | 4–14 | 7th | |
| 2015 | Jexx Varner | 4–37 | 1–17 | 7th | |
| 2016 | Jexx Varner | 13–32 | 3–15 | 7th | |
| 2017 | Jexx Varner | 13–28 | 5–13 | 6th | |
| 2018 | Caitlyn de la Haba | 7–42 | 3–15 | 7th | |
| 2019 | Caitlyn de la Haba | 8–40–1 | 1–17 | 7th | |
| 2020 | Caitlyn de la Haba | 1–11 | 0–0 | N/A | Season cut short due to COVID-19 pandemic |
| 2021 | Caitlyn de la Haba | 1–21 | 1–17 | 7th | |
| 2022 | Caitlyn de la Haba | 10–37 | 2–16 | 7th | |
| 2023 | Karavin Dew | 8–36–1 | 4–14 | 6th | |
| 2024 | Karavin Dew | 5–37 | 1–17 | 7th | |
| 2025 | Kelliner Croushere | 7–31 | 5–13 | 6th | |
| 2026 | Kelliner Croushere | 16–36 | 7–11 | 4th | |
| Total: | | 348–1,129–5 (.237) | | | |
National champion Postseason invitational champion Conference regular season champion Conference regular season and conference tournament champion Division regular season champion Division regular season and conference tournament champion Conference tournament champion

== See also ==
- List of NCAA Division I softball programs
