= Boston University Terriers softball =

College softball team

Boston University Terriers
- University: Boston University
- Head coach: Ashley Waters (11th season)
- Conference: Patriot League
- Location: Boston, Massachusetts, US
- Home stadium: BU Softball Field (capacity: 500)
- Nickname: Terriers
- Colors: Scarlet and white

NCAA Tournament appearances
- 1996, 2002, 2003, 2009, 2010, 2012, 2014, 2016, 2018, 2019, 2021, 2023, 2024, 2025, 2026

Conference tournament championships
- NAC: 1992, 1993, 1996; AEC: 1997, 2002, 2003, 2009, 2010, 2012; PL: 2014, 2016, 2018, 2019, 2021, 2023, 2024, 2025, 2026

Regular-season conference championships
- NAC: 1993; AEC: 2002, 2003, 2007, 2010, 2011, 2012; PL: 2018, 2019, 2021, 2022, 2023, 2024, 2026

The Boston University Terriers softball team represents Boston University in NCAA Division I college softball. The team participates in the Patriot League (PL), having joined in 2014. From 1988 until 2013, the team was a member of the North Atlantic Conference (NAC), later known as the America East Conference (AEC). The Terriers are currently led by head coach Ashley Waters. The team plays its home games at BU Softball Field located on the university's campus.

== History ==
The Terriers have had consistent success since 1988, having won 12 regular season championships and 15 conference tournament championships. In addition to the conference tournament wins, the team has qualified for the NCAA Division I softball tournament 12 times.

In Boston University's first appearance in the NCAA tournament in 1996, the Terriers advanced as far as the regional finals after defeating Connecticut and UMass before losing to Princeton by a score of 3–1. The Terriers appearances in the 2002 and 2003 tournaments were not as successful, going winless in both. The 2009 tournament saw the team return to winning form, with the program advancing to the regional finals for the second time ever after defeating Iowa and Auburn. They were eliminated from the tournament by Georgia Tech. In the 2010, 2012, 2014, and 2023 tournaments, Boston University advanced to the second round of the tournament before being eliminated.

During their tenure in the America East Conference, the Terriers won 10 Player of the Year awards, winning in 1993 and 1995 with Michelle White, 1997 with Beth Iwamoto, 1999 with Laruen Mark, 2002, 2003, and 2005 with Jamie Haas, 2007 with Christy Leath, and 2010 and 2011 with April Setterlund. Coaches Deb Solfaro and Shawn Rychcik won Coach of the Year awards, with Solfaro winning in 2000 and Rychcik in 2007 and 2010–2012. Since joining the Patriot League in 2014, the team has won numerous individual awards. The Terriers have won the PL Player of the Year award five times, doing so in 2017 with Jilee Schanda, 2018 and 2019 with Alex Heinen, 2021 with Caitlin Coker, and 2022 and 2023 with Kayla Roncin. Head coach Ashley Waters has won PL Coach of the Year four times, doing so in 2018 and each year from 2021–2023.

In the 2023 season, the Terriers set a Patriot League record by winning 28 consecutive games in a row. The team also set a record for most wins in a season in program history, having won 52 games.

=== Coaching history ===
Years	Coach	Record	%
1988–1989	Lisa Cropper	20–31	.392
1990–1995	Laurie LeGoff	134–76–1	.637
1996–2000	Deb Solfaro	186–96	.660
2001–2004	Amy Hayes	121–95	.560
2005–2012	Shawn Rychcik	271–159–1	.630
2013–2015	Kathryn Gleason	74–72–1	.507
2016–present	Ashley Waters	410–170–1	.707

== Roster ==
2024 Boston University Terriers roster
Pitchers: 27 – Lizzy Avery – Graduate Student; 8 – Allison Boaz – Graduate Student; 1 – Kelly Colleran – Freshman; 12 – Olivia DeLong – Sophomore; 5 – Haley Ganino – Sophomore; 77 – Kasey Ricard – Sophomore; Catchers: 9 – Livia Christopher – Freshman; 13 – Audrey Sellers – Graduate Student; Outfielders: 51 – Kylie Doherty – Freshman; 26 – Lauren Keleher – Senior; 34 – Aimee Metz – Sophomore; 11 – Sophie Naivar – Freshman; 23 – Tyesha Williams – Junior	Infielders: 10 – Kyomi Apalit – Freshman; 22 – Caitlin Coker – Graduate Student; 4 – Brooke Deppiesse – Sophomore; 24 – Lauren Nett – Senior; 3 – Kate Pryor – Senior; 21 – Kayla Roncin – Senior; Utility: 19 – Raegan Kelly – Senior; 17 – Sydney Pecoraro – Junior

== Season-by-season results ==
Record table
Season	Coach	Overall	Conference	Standing	Postseason
Boston University Terriers (North Atlantic Conference) (1988–1996)
1988	Lisa Cropper	5–12			
1989	Lisa Cropper	15–19			
1990	Laurie LeGoff	8–34–1			
1991	Laurie LeGoff	26–14	2–4		
1992	Laurie LeGoff	29–12	6–4	3rd	
1993	Laurie LeGoff	35–7	8–0	1st	
1994	Laurie LeGoff	36–9	8–2	2nd	
1995	Laurie LeGoff	33–11	9–1	2nd	
1996	Deb Solfaro	36–10	11–3	2nd	NCAA Regionals
Boston University Terriers (America East Conference) (1997–2013)
1997	Deb Solfaro	28–17	8–5	3rd	
1998	Deb Solfaro	25–24	8–6	T–3rd	
1999	Deb Solfaro	28–15	7–7	5th	
2000	Deb Solfaro	36–19	19–7	3rd	
2001	Amy Hayes	34–17	21–5	1st	
2002	Amy Hayes	28–23	19–3	1st	NCAA Regionals
2003	Amy Hayes	33–23	17–3	1st	NCAA Regionals
2004	Amy Hayes	26–32	11–7	3rd	
2005	Shawn Rychcik	26–19–1	14–4	2nd	
2006	Shawn Rychcik	29–29	11–10	T–3rd	
2007	Shawn Rychcik	34–14	17–3	1st	
2008	Shawn Rychcik	29–23	15–6	2nd	
2009	Shawn Rychcik	43–18	14–6	2nd	NCAA Regionals
2010	Shawn Rychcik	35–22	14–3	1st	NCAA Regionals
2011	Shawn Rychcik	34–18	14–4	T–1st	
2012	Shawn Rychcik	41–16	15–3	1st	NCAA Regionals
2013	Kathryn Gleason	21–26–1	8–9	5th	
Boston University Terriers (Patriot League) (2014–present)
2014	Kathryn Gleason	36–19	13–5	2nd	NCAA Regionals
2015	Kathryn Gleason	17–27	7–11	6th	
2016	Ashley Waters	28–24	11–6	3rd	NCAA Regionals
2017	Ashley Waters	25–27	14–3	2nd	
2018	Ashley Waters	39–20	15–3	1st	NCAA Regionals
2019	Ashley Waters	37–20	15–2	1st	NCAA Regionals
2020	Ashley Waters	14–8	0–0	N/A	Season cut short due to COVID-19 pandemic
2021	Ashley Waters	36–4	21–1	1st	NCAA Regionals
2022	Ashley Waters	40–17	16–2	1st	
2023	Ashley Waters	52–10	17–1	1st	NCAA Regionals
2024	Ashley Waters	53–6–1	18–0	1st	NCAA Regionals
2025	Ashley Waters	39–19	14–4	2nd	NCAA Regionals
2026	Ashley Waters	47–15	16–2	1st	NCAA Regionals
Total:		1,216–699–4 (.635)			
National champion Postseason invitational champion Conference regular season champion Conference regular season and conference tournament champion Division regular season champion Division regular season and conference tournament champion Conference tournament champion

== See also ==
- List of NCAA Division I softball programs
