= Lehigh Mountain Hawks softball =

College softball team

- University: Lehigh University
- Head coach: Fran Troyan (31st season)
- Conference: Patriot League
- Location: Bethlehem, Pennsylvania, US
- Home stadium: Leadership Park
- Nickname: Mountain Hawks
- Colors: Brown and white

NCAA Tournament appearances
- 2001, 2004, 2005, 2006, 2008, 2009, 2011, 2012, 2015, 2017, 2022

Conference tournament championships
- 1993, 1994, 1995, 1996, 2001, 2004, 2005, 2006, 2008, 2009, 2011, 2012, 2015, 2017, 2022

Regular-season conference championships
- 1993, 1994, 1995, 1996, 1997, 1999, 2000, 2001, 2002, 2003, 2004, 2005, 2006, 2007, 2008, 2009, 2012, 2013, 2014, 2015, 2016, 2017

The Lehigh Mountain Hawks softball team represents Lehigh University in NCAA Division I college softball. The team participates in the Patriot League (PL), having joined as a founding member in 1991. From 1977 until 1990, the team was a member of the East Coast Conference. The Mountain Hawks are currently led by head coach Fran Troyan. The team plays its home games at Leadership Park located on the university's campus.

== History ==
Since joining the Patriot League in 1991, the Mountain Hawks have had significant success as a program. The team has won 22 regular season titles, 15 PL Conference Tournaments, and has qualified for the NCAA Division I softball tournament 11 times.

The program has managed a win in five of their eleven appearances in the NCAA Tournament. In the 2006 tournament, Lehigh won a program record two games in the tournament, defeating Texas A&M twice, first in the opening round of the tournament and finally in the loser's bracket, eliminating the Aggies. Lehigh was eliminated from the tournament by UMass.

Lehigh has won several awards during their tenure in the Patriot League. The team has won eight PL Player of the Year awards, doing so in 1995 and 1996 with Kim Miller, 2007 with Kate Marvel, 2008 with Lisa Sweeney, 2010 with Julie Fernandez, 2012 with Jen Colquhoun, and 2013 and 2014 with Morgan Decker. The team has also won eight PL Coach of the Year awards, winning in 1993 with Sue Troyan, and in 1997, 2005, 2007, each year from 2012 to 2014, and 2017 with Fran Troyan.

=== Coaching history ===
| Years | Coach | Record | % |
|---|---|---|---|
| 1977–1978 | J.G. Thompson | 14–7 | .667 |
| 1979 | Annette Lynch | 6–8 | .429 |
| 1980 | Patricia Zajac | 7–6 | .538 |
| 1981–1982 | Maureen Frederick | 15–16 | .484 |
| 1983–1985 | Muffet McGraw | 17–45 | .274 |
| 1986 | Hope Donnell | 3–24 | .111 |
| 1987–1990 | Tammy Danner | 51–102 | .333 |
| 1991–1995 | Sue Troyan | 126–90–1 | .583 |
| 1996–present | Fran Troyan | 951–564–8 | .627 |

== Roster ==
2024 Lehigh Mountain Hawks roster
| Pitchers: 3 – Maddy Clark – Freshman; 18 – Ansley Dambach – Senior; 2 – Chloe Hess – Sophomore; 21 – Maria Urban – Junior; 11 – Katelyn Young – Senior; Catchers: 10 – Rory Dudley – Junior; 24 – Amanda Greaney – Senior; Outfielders: 1 – Brooke Cannon – Senior; 6 – Emily Cimino – Graduate Student; 7 – Lindsey Martin – Junior; 28 – Gracie Smith – Freshman | Infielders: 5 – Josie Charles – Graduate Student; 15 – Crysta Duenas – Sophomore; 77 – Holly Lovett – Freshman; 13 – Julia Mrochko – Junior; 20 – Maddy Schmeiser – Junior; Utility: 4 – Sydney Parlett – Sophomore; 17 – Abbey Tabaka – Sophomore |

== Season-by-season results ==
Record table
| Season | Coach | Overall | Conference | Standing | Postseason |
|---|---|---|---|---|---|
Lehigh Engineers (East Coast Conference) (1977–1990)
| 1977 | J.G. Thompson | N/A (Note: Records are unavailable for 1977, 1978, 1981–1985, and 1987–1990. Coach names and win totals are available via Lehigh records. Coaches who only coached one year have their season win totals available, but not conference record or conference finish position.) | N/A | N/A | |
| 1978 | J.G. Thompson | N/A | N/A | N/A | |
| 1979 | Annette Lynch | 6–8 | N/A | N/A | |
| 1980 | Patricia Zajac | 7–6 | N/A | N/A | |
| 1981 | Maureen Frederick | N/A | N/A | N/A | |
| 1982 | Maureen Frederick | N/A | N/A | N/A | |
| 1983 | Muffet McGraw | N/A | N/A | N/A | |
| 1984 | Muffet McGraw | N/A | N/A | N/A | |
| 1985 | Muffet McGraw | N/A | N/A | N/A | |
| 1986 | Hope Donnell | 3–24 | N/A | N/A | |
| 1987 | Tammy Danner | N/A | N/A | N/A | |
| 1988 | Tammy Danner | N/A | N/A | N/A | |
| 1989 | Tammy Danner | N/A | N/A | N/A | |
| 1990 | Tammy Danner | N/A | N/A | N/A | |
Lehigh Engineers/Mountain Hawks (Patriot League) (1991–present)
| 1991 | Sue Troyan | 10–25–1 | 1–11 | 7th | |
| 1992 | Sue Troyan | 21–21 | 8–4 | 2nd | |
| 1993 | Sue Troyan | 29–15 | 10–2 | 1st | |
| 1994 | Sue Troyan | 28–17 | 10–2 | T–1st | |
| 1995 | Sue Troyan | 38–12 | 11–1 | 1st | |
| 1996 | Fran Troyan | 33–14 | 9–1 | 1st | |
| 1997 | Fran Troyan | 21–20 | 7–3 | 1st | |
| 1998 | Fran Troyan | 23–29 | 12–8 | 3rd | |
| 1999 | Fran Troyan | 21–30 | 12–8 | T–1st | |
| 2000 | Fran Troyan | 26–23 | 9–1 | 1st | |
| 2001 | Fran Troyan | 39–15 | 18–2 | 1st | NCAA Regionals |
| 2002 | Fran Troyan | 36–16 | 17–3 | 1st | |
| 2003 | Fran Troyan | 39–10 | 19–1 | 1st | |
| 2004 | Fran Troyan | 40–17–2 | 16–2 | 1st | NCAA Regionals |
| 2005 | Fran Troyan | 41–10 | 18–0 | 1st | NCAA Regionals |
| 2006 | Fran Troyan | 43–14 | 19–1 | 1st | NCAA Regionals |
| 2007 | Fran Troyan | 35–18–1 | 17–1 | 1st | |
| 2008 | Fran Troyan | 39–17–1 | 14–6 | 1st | NCAA Regionals |
| 2009 | Fran Troyan | 38–18–1 | 17–3 | 1st | NCAA Regionals |
| 2010 | Fran Troyan | 31–19 | 14–6 | 2nd | |
| 2011 | Fran Troyan | 33–23 | 14–5 | 2nd | NCAA Regionals |
| 2012 | Fran Troyan | 40–19 | 18–2 | 1st | NCAA Regionals |
| 2013 | Fran Troyan | 37–16–1 | 17–3 | 1st | |
| 2014 | Fran Troyan | 30–20 | 15–3 | 1st | |
| 2015 | Fran Troyan | 40–9 | 16–2 | 1st | NCAA Regionals |
| 2016 | Fran Troyan | 36–16 | 13–4 | 1st | |
| 2017 | Fran Troyan | 36–20 | 16–2 | 1st | NCAA Regionals |
| 2018 | Fran Troyan | 24–26–1 | 11–7 | 3rd | |
| 2019 | Fran Troyan | 27–28 | 11–7 | 3rd | |
| 2020 | Fran Troyan | 8–9 | 0–0 | N/A | Season cut short due to COVID-19 pandemic |
| 2021 | Fran Troyan | 18–16 | 14–8 | 2nd | |
| 2022 | Fran Troyan | 31–20–1 | 15–3 | 2nd | NCAA Regionals |
| 2023 | Fran Troyan | 40–14 | 16–2 | 2nd | |
| 2024 | Fran Troyan | 32–20 | 14–4 | 2nd | |
| 2025 | Fran Troyan | 28–24 | 13–5 | 3rd | |
| 2026 | Fran Troyan | 26–28 | 5–13 | 6th | |
| Total: | | 1,190–862–9 (.580) | | | |
National champion Postseason invitational champion Conference regular season champion Conference regular season and conference tournament champion Division regular season champion Division regular season and conference tournament champion Conference tournament champion

== See also ==
- List of NCAA Division I softball programs
