= Colgate Raiders softball =

College softball team

- University: Colgate University
- Head coach: Marissa Lamison-Myers (9th season)
- Conference: Patriot League
- Location: Hamilton, New York, US
- Home stadium: Eaton Street Softball Complex
- Nickname: Raiders
- Colors: Maroon and white

NCAA Tournament appearances
- 1999, 2003, 2007

Conference tournament championships
- 1999, 2003, 2007

Regular-season conference championships
- 1999, 2011

The Colgate Raiders softball team represents Colgate University in NCAA Division I. The team participates in the Patriot League (PL), having joined in 1991. From 1979 until 1990, the team was independent. The Raiders are currently led by head coach Marissa Lamison-Myers. The team plays its home games at Eaton Street Softball Complex located on the university's campus.

== History ==
Since joining the Patriot League in 1991 as a founding program, the Raiders have had some moderate success. The team has won two regular season championships, doing so in 1999 in a three way tie, and also in 2011 outright. The program has won the Patriot League Tournament three times, doing so in 1999, 2003, and 2007. By winning the tournament, the team advanced to the NCAA Division I softball tournament.

Despite qualifying for the 1999, 2003, and 2007 tournaments, Colgate failed to win a single game in each of them.

Colgate has won several awards during their time in the Patriot League. The program has won four PL Player of the Year awards, winning in 1998 with Melissa Mack, 2003 with Melissa Rawson, 2004 with Dorothy Donaldson, and 2006 with LaPorscha Albert. The team has also won three PL Coach of the Year awards, winning them in 2003, 2007, and 2009 with Vickie Sax.

Marissa Lamison-Myers was hired as the program's head coach in July 2017.

=== Coaching history ===
Years	Coach	Record	%
1979–1983, 1985	Janet Little	66–59–1	.528
1984	Matt Leone	8–8	.500
1986–1987	Cydney Archer	28–32	.467
1988–1991	Ron Case	76–63	.547
1992–1993	Heidi Hazen	79–76	.510
1994–1997	Katie Flynn	60–87	.408
1998–2010	Vickie Sax	313–285–1	.523
2011	Ashley Obrest	27–20	.574
2012	Jaime Grillo	19–28	.404
2013–2017	Melissa Finley	71–142–1	.334
2018–present	Marissa Lamison-Myers	170–228–1	.427

== Roster ==
2024 Colgate Raiders roster
Pitchers: 27 – Alexa Acker – Sophomore; 1 – Mia Edwards – Junior; 25 – Bailey Misken – Graduate Student; 20 – Maya Servedio – Sophomore; Catchers: 19 – Quinn Livesay – Junior; 9 – Rowan Mulholland – Sophomore; Outfielders: 5 – Niamh Dougherty – Freshman; 3 – Nora Megenity – Freshman; 24 – Cate Murray – Sophomore; 8 – Kiley Shelton – Freshman; 7 – Claire Whalen – Junior	Infielders: 21 – Rachel Carney – Graduate Student; 22 – Amanda DeSantis – Junior; 2 – Kara Fusco – Senior; 4 – Elizabeth Nitka – Senior; 15 – Alexis Romero – Junior; 10 – Jenna Soe – Freshman; Utility: 11 – Jillian Herbst – Junior; 12 – Adrienne Nardone – Graduate Student; 23 – Dani Rosner – Sophomore

== Season-by-season results ==
Record table
Season	Coach	Overall	Conference	Standing	Postseason
Colgate Raiders (Independent) (1979–1990)
1979	Janet Little	8–8			
1980	Janet Little	10–5			
1981	Janet Little	12–6			
1982	Janet Little	13–10			
1983	Janet Little	13–9			
1984	Matt Leone	8–8			
1985	Janet Little	10–21–1			
1986	Cydney Archer	12–18			
1987	Cydney Archer	16–14			
1988	Ron Case	17–12			
1989	Ron Case	16–15			
1990	Ron Case	24–15			
Colgate Raiders (Patriot League) (1991–present)
1991	Ron Case	19–21	6–3	3rd	
1992	Heidi Hazen	24–12	7–5	T–3rd	
1993	Heidi Hazen	15–16	7–5	T–3rd	
1994	Katie Flynn	14–23	3–9	T–5th	
1995	Katie Flynn	13–26	6–6	4th	
1996	Katie Flynn	11–20	4–6	T–3rd	
1997	Katie Flynn	22–18	4–6	T–4th	
1998	Vickie Sax	25–23–1	11–9	4th	
1999	Vickie Sax	23–25	12–8	T–1st	NCAA Regionals
2000	Vickie Sax	21–27	3–7	5th	
2001	Vickie Sax	30–26	10–10	3rd	
2002	Vickie Sax	28–20	12–6	3rd	
2003	Vickie Sax	29–15	15–5	2nd	NCAA Regionals
2004	Vickie Sax	34–17	11–7	3rd	
2005	Vickie Sax	19–19	11–8	3rd	
2006	Vickie Sax	17–25	10–10	T–2nd	
2007	Vickie Sax	25–24	12–5	2nd	NCAA Regionals
2008	Vickie Sax	10–23	7–13	5th	
2009	Vickie Sax	25–18	12–8	2nd	
2010	Vickie Sax	27–23	8–12	T–4th	
2011	Ashley Obrest	27–21	16–3	1st	
2012	Jaime Grillo	19–28	12–8	3rd	
2013	Melissa Finley	16–32	9–11	4th	
2014	Melissa Finley	13–30	5–13	6th	
2015	Melissa Finley	17–21	9–9	T–3rd	
2016	Melissa Finley	12–29	7–11	5th	
2017	Melissa Finley	13–30–1	3–15	7th	
2018	Marissa Lamison-Myers	11–32	6–12	5th	
2019	Marissa Lamison-Myers	25–27	8–10	T–4th	
2020	Marissa Lamison-Myers	11–9	0–0	N/A	Season cut short due to COVID-19 pandemic
2021	Marissa Lamison-Myers	17–15–1	14–9–1	3rd	
2022	Marissa Lamison-Myers	20–28	9–9	4th	
2023	Marissa Lamison-Myers	17–31	6–12	5th	
2024	Marissa Lamison-Myers	22–28	8–10	5th	
2025	Marissa Lamison-Myers	18–33	6–12	5th	
2026	Marissa Lamison-Myers	29–26	13–5	2nd	
Total:		917–1,028–4 (.472)			
National champion Postseason invitational champion Conference regular season champion Conference regular season and conference tournament champion Division regular season champion Division regular season and conference tournament champion Conference tournament champion

== See also ==
- List of NCAA Division I softball programs
