= Army Black Knights softball =

- University: United States Military Academy
- Head coach: Jen Consaul (4th season)
- Conference: Patriot League
- Location: West Point, New York, US
- Home stadium: Army Softball Complex
- Nickname: Black Knights
- Colors: Black, gold, and gray

NCAA Tournament appearances
- 2000, 2002, 2013

Conference tournament championships
- MAAC: 1986, 1988; PL: 1991, 1992, 2000, 2002, 2013

Regular-season conference championships
- MAAC: 1986, 1988; PL: 1991, 1992, 2010, 2025

The Army Black Knights softball team represents the United States Military Academy in NCAA Division I. The team participates in the Patriot League. From 1982 until 1990, the team was a member of the Metro Atlantic Athletic Conference (MAAC). The Black Knights are currently led by head coach Jen Consaul. The team plays its home games at Army Softball Complex located on the university's campus.

== History ==
During their time in the Metro Atlantic Athletic Conference, the Black Knights won the conference regular season title twice as well as two MAAC tournament championships, achieving both during the 1986 and 1988 seasons. The team has had two players named MAAC tournament MVP, with third baseman Andee Hidalgo winning the award in 1986 and pitcher Colleen McCabe winning in 1988.

After switching to the Patriot League in 1991, the team found immediate success by winning the regular season and conference championship in 1991 and 1992. The team also won the PL conference tournament in 2000, 2002, and 2013, qualifying for the NCAA Division I softball tournament in each season. Army has won PL Coach of the Year five times, doing so in 1991, 1992, and 2002 with Jim Flowers, and 2010 and 2016 with Michelle DePolo. The program has also won seven PL Player of the Year awards, doing so in 1991 with McCabe, 1992 with Paula Bostwick, 1994 with Sheri Schweiker, 2000, 2001, and 2002 with Nicki Robbins, and in 2016 with Kasey McCravey.

The Black Knights qualified for their first NCAA tournament in 2000, facing off in the first round of regionals against Washington. They were defeated by a score of 5-0 and were sent to the losers bracket where they faced off against Chattanooga. Army was officially eliminated from the tournament after losing a close 6-4 contest that went to extra innings. The program qualified for the tournament for the second time in three years in 2002. In the team's first game of the tournament, the Black Knights were defeated by Texas by a score of 4-0. After being sent to the losers bracket, the program won its first NCAA tournament game after defeating Utah 2-0. Army's run was ended after losing to Arkansas by a score of 2-0. After an 11-year absence, the Black Knights qualified for the 2013 NCAA Division I softball tournament and faced off against Texas, where they were defeated by a score of 5-0. They were eliminated from the tournament by Houston by a score of 7-5.

=== Coaching history ===
Years	Coach	Record	%
1979–1980	Dennis Helsel	24–16	.600
1981, 1983	Lorraine Quinn	15–27	.357
1982	Suzi Horne	5–14	.263
1984–1985	Harold Johnson	28–36	.438
1986–1989	Al Arceo	107–47	.695
1990	Gary Winton	29–10	.744
1991–2009	Jim Flowers	394–492–2	.445
2010–2018	Michelle DePolo	280–216–1	.564
2019	Bob Beretta	26–30	.464
2020–2022	Cheryl Milligan	50–60	.455
2023–present	Jen Consaul	104–123	.458

== Roster ==
2024 Army Black Knights roster
Pitchers: 19 – Amanda Eaglin – Sophomore; 24 – Olivia Farris – Junior; 7 – Katelyn Flanders – Freshman; 11 – Breanna Izzo – Sophomore; 27 – Lauren Levendoski – Freshman; 16 – Parker Llantero – Senior; Catchers: 25 – Mia Bonsignore – Sophomore; 23 – Ellie Caldwell – Senior; 12 – Jordyn Detz – Freshman; 2 – Mikayla Klepfer – Senior; 29 – Emma Murchison – Freshman; 20 – Caitlyn Newburn – Sophomore; 13 – Sophie Smith – Junior	Infielders: 10 – Sam Bocis – Freshman; 6 – Taylor Brown – Sophomore; 1 – Maaika Dones – Junior; 30 – Julia Farris – Junior; 22 – Lauren Little – Senior; 9 – Samantha Sims – Freshman; 15 – Ashton White – Sophomore; Outfielders: 3 – Kayla Edwards – Junior; 4 – Nessa Andersen – Sophomore

== Season-by-season results ==
Record table
Season	Coach	Overall	Conference	Standing	Postseason
Army Black Knights (AIAW) (1979–1981)
1979	Dennis Helsel	14–9			
1980	Dennis Helsel	10–7			
1981	Lorraine Quinn	9–11			
Army Black Knights (Metro Atlantic Athletic Conference) (1982–1990)
1982	Suzi Horne	5–14			
1983	Lorraine Quinn	6–16			
1984	Harold Johnson	18–14			
1985	Harold Johnson	10–22			
1986	Al Arceo	27–7		1st	
1987	Al Arceo	23–18		2nd	
1988	Al Arceo	33–11		1st	
1989	Al Arceo	24–11		3rd	
1990	Gary Winton	29–10		2nd	
Army Black Knights (Patriot League) (1991–present)
1991	Jim Flowers	28–13	12–0	1st	
1992	Jim Flowers	28–15	11–1	1st	
1993	Jim Flowers	15–26–1	7–5	4th	
1994	Jim Flowers	23–20	8–4	3rd	
1995	Jim Flowers	13–33	4–8	5th	
1996	Jim Flowers	11–31	3–7	5th	
1997	Jim Flowers	12–31	4–6	5th	
1998	Jim Flowers	16–24	6–12	5th	
1999	Jim Flowers	25–19	8–12	5th	
2000	Jim Flowers	29–18	8–2	2nd	NCAA Regionals
2001	Jim Flowers	20–27	9–11	4th	
2002	Jim Flowers	31–19–1	14–4	2nd	NCAA Regionals
2003	Jim Flowers	20–27	9–11	4th	
2004	Jim Flowers	27–22	15–5	2nd	
2005	Jim Flowers	29–21	12–6	2nd	
2006	Jim Flowers	18–37	9–11	4th	
2007	Jim Flowers	15–36	9–11	4th	
2008	Jim Flowers	13–39	8–12	4th	
2009	Jim Flowers	21–34	8–12	T–4th	
2010	Michelle DePolo	33–20	15–5	1st	
2011	Michelle DePolo	28–25	9–11	4th	
2012	Michelle DePolo	37–21	14–6	2nd	
2013	Michelle DePolo	35–26	12–8	2nd	NCAA Regionals
2014	Michelle DePolo	23–28	9–9	4th	
2015	Michelle DePolo	23–27	9–9	T–3rd	
2016	Michelle DePolo	39–20	13–5	2nd	
2017	Michelle DePolo	36–21	10–8	3rd	
2018	Michelle DePolo	26–28	10–8	4th	
2019	Bob Beretta	26–30	8–10	T–4th	
2020	Cheryl Milligan	14–9	0–0	N/A	Season cut short due to COVID-19 pandemic
2021	Cheryl Milligan	16–17	12–10	4th	
2022	Cheryl Milligan	20–34	10–8	3rd	
2023	Jen Consaul	22–37	8–10	4th	
2024	Jen Consaul	14–39	9–9	T–3rd	
2025	Jen Consaul	35–22	16–2	1st	
2026	Jen Consaul	33–25	12–6	3rd	
Total:		1,062–1,071–3 (.498)			
National champion Postseason invitational champion Conference regular season champion Conference regular season and conference tournament champion Division regular season champion Division regular season and conference tournament champion Conference tournament champion

== See also ==
- List of NCAA Division I softball programs
