= Big South Conference softball tournament =

American college softball tournament

- Conference softball championship
- Sport: Softball
- Conference: Big South Conference
- Number of teams: 6
- Format: Double-elimination tournament
- Current stadium: Cyrill Softball Stadium
- Current location: Spartanburg, South Carolina
- Played: 1987–present
- Last contest: 2025
- Current champion: USC Upstate (3)
- Most championships: Winthrop (6)

The Big South Conference softball tournament (also referred to as the Big South Tournament) is the conference championship tournament in college softball for the Big South Conference. It is a double-elimination tournament and seeding is based on regular season records. The winner receives the conference's automatic bid to the NCAA Division I softball tournament.

== Format ==
The top six teams from the regular season compete in the double-elimination tournament.

== Champions ==
=== Year-by-year ===
| Year | Champion | Location | MVP |
|---|---|---|---|
| 1987 | Winthrop | | N/A |
| 1988 | Charleston Southern | Winthrop Softball Complex • Rock Hill, SC | Dori Beach, Charleston Southern |
| 1989 | Winthrop | Coastal Carolina Softball Complex • Conway, SC | Lisa Kemme, Winthrop |
| 1990 | Winthrop | Coastal Carolina Softball Complex • Conway, SC | Lisa Kemme, P, Winthrop |
| 1991 | Winthrop | Winthrop Softball Complex • Rock Hill, SC | Lisa Kemme, P, Winthrop |
| 1992 | Coastal Carolina | CSU Softball Complex • North Charleston, SC | Michelle Hall, P, Coastal Carolina |
| 1993 | Campbell | Campbell Softball Field • Buies Creek, NC | Andrea Nardolillo, P, Campbell |
| 1994 | UNC Greensboro | Winthrop Softball Complex • Rock Hill, SC | Winn Hazelgrove, P, UNC Greensboro |
| 1995 | UNC Greensboro | Winthrop Softball Complex • Rock Hill, SC | Christine Yon, 2B, Winthrop |
| 1996 | UNC Greensboro | UNCG Softball Field • Greensboro, NC | Erin Chandler, P, UNC Greensboro |
| 1997 | UNC Greensboro | Winthrop Softball Complex • Rock Hill, SC | Christine Hornak, P, UNC Greensboro |
| 1998 | Coastal Carolina | Winthrop Softball Complex • Rock Hill, SC | Kacee Crumpacker, SS, Coastal Carolina; Katie Phillips, P, Liberty |
| 1999 | East Carolina | Winthrop Softball Complex • Rock Hill, SC | Denise Reagan, P, East Carolina |
| 2000 | Coastal Carolina | Coastal Carolina Softball Complex • Conway, SC | Lauren Yates, P, Coastal Carolina |
| 2001 | Coastal Carolina | James I. Moyer Sports Complex • Salem, VA | Sarah Lockett, 3B, Coastal Carolina |
| 2002 | Liberty | Terry Field • Rock Hill, SC | Ali Thompson, P, Liberty |
| 2003 | Texas A&M–Corpus Christi | Terry Field • Rock Hill, SC | Sarah Pauly, P, Texas A&M–Corpus Christi |
| 2004 | Texas A&M–Corpus Christi | BSC Softball Park • Birmingham, SC | Sarah Pauly, P, Texas A&M–Corpus Christi |
| 2005 | Texas A&M–Corpus Christi | Terry Field • Rock Hill, SC | Sarah Pauly, P, Texas A&M–Corpus Christi |
| 2006 | Coastal Carolina | Radford Softball Stadium • Radford, VA | Christine Doyle, P, Coastal Carolina |
| 2007 | Winthrop | Coastal Carolina Softball Complex • Conway, SC | Cari Wooldridge, P, Winthrop |
| 2008 | Winthrop | Terry Field • Rock Hill, SC | Cari Wooldridge, P, Winthrop |
| 2009 | Radford | Radford Softball Stadium • Radford, VA | Kristen Shifflett, SS, Radford |
| 2010 | Radford | Coastal Carolina Softball Complex • Conway, SC | Kristen Shifflett, SS, Radford |
| 2011 | Liberty | Terry Field • Rock Hill, SC | Tiffani Smith, P, Liberty |
| 2012 | Coastal Carolina | Radford Softball Stadium • Radford, VA | Sarah Maples, UTIL, Coastal Carolina |
| 2013 | Longwood | Terry Field • Rock Hill, SC | Libby Morris, P, Longwood |
| 2014 | Charleston Southern | Coastal Carolina Softball Complex • Conway, SC | Cheyenne Gandara, P, Charleston Southern |
| 2015 | Longwood | Amanda Littlejohn Stadium • Buies Creek, NC | Libby Morris, P, Longwood |
| 2016 | Longwood | Terry Field • Rock Hill, SC | Sydney Gay, P, Longwood |
| 2017 | Longwood | Lancer Field • Farmville, VA | Elizabeth McCarthy, P, Longwood |
| 2018 | Liberty | Radford Softball Stadium • Radford, VA | Autumn Bishop, 1B, Liberty |
| 2019 | Longwood | Amanda Littlejohn Stadium • Buies Creek, NC | Karleigh Donovan, 1B, Longwood |
| 2020 | Canceled due to the COVID-19 pandemic. | | |
| 2021 | Campbell | Brinkley Softball Stadium • Boiling Springs, NC | Claire Blount, UTIL, Campbell |
| 2022 | Campbell | Lancer Field • Farmville, VA | Georgeanna Barefoot, P, Campbell |
| 2023 | Campbell | Radford Softball Stadium • Radford, VA | Claudia Ware, OF, Campbell |
| 2024 | USC Upstate | Terry Field • Rock Hill, SC | Alyssa Kelly, P, USC Upstate |
| 2025 | USC Upstate | PC Softball Complex • Clinton, SC | Maddie Drerup, P, USC Upstate |
| 2026 | USC Upstate | Cyrill Softball Stadium • Spartanburg, SC | Maddie Drerup, P, USC Upstate |

=== By school ===
| School | Championships | Years |
|---|---|---|
| Winthrop | 6 | 1987, 1989, 1990, 1991, 2007, 2008 |
| Coastal Carolina | 5 | 1992, 1998, 2000, 2001, 2006 |
| Longwood | 5 | 2013, 2015, 2016, 2017, 2019 |
| Campbell | 4 | 1993, 2021, 2022, 2023 |
| UNC Greensboro | 4 | 1994, 1995, 1996, 1997 |
| Liberty | 3 | 2002, 2011, 2018 |
| USC Upstate | 3 | 2024, 2025, 2026 |
| Texas A&M–Corpus Christi | 3 | 2003, 2004, 2005 |
| Charleston Southern | 2 | 1988, 2014 |
| Radford | 2 | 2009, 2010 |
| East Carolina | 1 | 1999 |

Italics indicates the school currently does not sponsor softball in the Big South.
