= 2019 National Invitational Softball Championship =

College softball tournament

- Season: 2019
- Teams: 19
- Format: Double Elimination
- Finals site: TC Colorado Field, Fort Collins, Colorado
- Champions: UT Arlington (1st title)
- Runner-up: Iowa State (1st title game)
- Winning coach: Peejay Brun (1st title)
- MVP: Aileen Garcia (UT Arlington)

The 2019 National Invitational Softball Championship (NISC) began on May 16, 2019 and concluded on May 26.

== Tournament play and team selection ==
The NISC tournament is designed to feature forty-eight teams in eight six-team regional tournaments with the regional champions advancing to a National Finals tournament. The regionals and the Finals are double-elimination competitions.

For the inaugural tournament, only fifteen of the thirty-two NCAA conferences sent an automatic qualifier (AQ). Seven schools having non-losing records and RPIs in the top 100 entered the tournament with "National RPI" bids. Four other teams with non-losing records against challenging schedules were added as "At-large" teams. The twenty-six teams were placed in six regional tournaments of four or five teams. The six regional champions advanced to the national finals at Liberty University, a site that was determined after the regional competitions.

== Participants ==
Conference	School	Best finish	Reference
Sun Belt	Appalachian State	1st Appearance	
OVC	Eastern Kentucky	Championship Round (2018)	
Mountain West	Fresno State	1st Appearance	
A-10	George Washington	1st Appearance	
Big 12	Iowa State	1st Appearance	
MAC	Kent State	1st Appearance	
ASUN	Liberty	Champions (2017)	
WCC	Loyola Marymount	Champions (2018)	
Conference USA	Marshall	1st Appearance	
Southland	McNeese State	1st Appearance	
Conference USA	Middle Tennessee	1st Appearance	
Mountain West	Nevada	Regionals (2017, 2018)	
Big Ten	Purdue	1st Appearance	
Big Ten	Rutgers	1st Appearance	
Summit League	South Dakota	1st Appearance	
Summit League	South Dakota State	Regionals (2018)	
Southland	Stephen F. Austin	Regionals (2018)	
Big West	UC Riverside	Championship Round (2018)	
Sun Belt	UT Arlington	Championship Round (2018)	

== Regionals ==
=== Nevada Regional ===
First round
Fresno State	18
UC Riverside	10
Nevada	4
Loyola Marymount	3
Lower round 1
UC Riverside	0
Loyola Marymount	10

Regional Semi-Finals
Fresno State	3
Nevada	8
Lower final
Fresno State	5
Loyola Marymount	8

Regional finals
Nevada
Loyola Marymount

=== Stephan F. Austin Regional ===
First round
Stephen F. Austin	0
UT Arlington	7
Middle Tennessee	3
McNeese State	7
Lower round 1
Stephen F. Austin	4
Middle Tennessee	0

Regional Semi-Finals
UT Arlington	5
McNeese State	3
Lower final
McNeese State	3
Stephen F. Austin	1

Regional finals
UT Arlington
McNeese State

=== Iowa State Regional ===
First round
4	South Dakota	3
5	Purdue	4
Lower round 1
South Dakota	2
Eastern Kentucky	7

Second Round
1	Iowa State	6
Purdue	1
2	South Dakota State	8
3	Eastern Kentucky	6
Lower round 2
Eastern Kentucky	1
Purdue	3

Regional semifinals
Iowa State	7
South Dakota State	2
Lower final
South Dakota State	1
Purdue	4

Regional finals
Iowa State	5
Purdue	3

=== Liberty Regional ===
First round
Appalachian State	1
Rutgers	2
George Washington	4
Marshall	1
Lower round 1
Appalachian State	1
George Washington	2
Marshall	4
Rutgers	0

Second Round
Liberty	1
Rutgers	0
George Washington	2
Kent State	7
Lower round 2
George Washington	1
Marshall	3

Regional semifinals
Liberty	4
Kent State	0
Lower final
Kent State	2
Marshall	4

Regional finals
Liberty	7
Marshall	0

== Regional Standings ==
The six regional tournaments were played May 16–18, 2019.

The regional and finals competitions were double-elimination tournaments.

NISC	Region († = host)			
Place	1 Reno, NV	2 Nacogdoches, TX	3 Ames, IA	4 Lynchburg, VA
1st	Loyola Marymount Lions	Texas–Arlington Mavericks	Iowa State Cyclones †	Liberty Lady Flames †
2nd	Nevada Wolf Pack †	McNeese State Cowgirls	Purdue Boilermakers	Marshall Thundering Herd
3rdt	Fresno State Bulldogs	Stephen F. Austin Ladyjacks †	South Dakota State Jackrabbits	Kent State Golden Flashes
4th	UC Riverside Highlanders	Middle Tennessee Blue Raiders	Eastern Kentucky Colonels	George Washington Colonials
5th			South Dakota Coyotes	Rutgers Scarlet Knights
6th				Appalachian State Mountaineers

== Championship Bracket ==
=== Participants ===
School	Conference	Record (Conference)	Head coach	Championship Round Appearances† (including 2019)	Championship Round Best finish†*	Championship Round W-L Record† (excluding 2019)
Iowa State	Big 12 Conference	35-23 (7-11)	Jamie Pinkerton	1 (last: 2019)		0-0
Liberty	Atlantic Sun Conference	40-20 (16-5)	Dot Richardson	2nd (last: 2017)	1st (2017)	5-1
Loyola Marymount	West Coast Conference	39-19 (11-4)	Sami Strinz-Ward	2nd (last: 2018)	1st (2018)	5-1
UT Arlington	Sun Belt Conference	33-27 (17-10)	Peejay Brun	2nd (last: 2018)	4th (2018)	0-2

=== Bracket ===
The third annual National Invitational Softball Championship finals were played May 24–26, 2018 at TC Colorado Field in Fort Collins, Colorado. Teams were seeded by their RPIs.

First round
Iowa State	5
Loyola Marymount	6
Liberty	8
UT Arlington	9
Lower round 1
Iowa State	7
Liberty	2

Semi-Finals
Loyola Marymount	3
UT Arlington	6
Lower final
Loyola Marymount	2
Iowa State	5

Championship
UT Arlington
Iowa State

=== Championship Game ===
School	Top Batter	Stats.
UTA Mavericks	Aileen Garcia (1B)	2-4 2RBIs
Iowa State Cyclones	Taylor Nearad (CF)	1-2 RBI

School	Pitcher	IP	H	R	ER	BB	SO	AB	BF
UTA Mavericks	Randi Phillips	4.1	3	3	2	3	1	15	19
UTA Mavericks	Allie Gardiner (W)	2.2	1	0	0	0	2	8	9
Iowa State Cyclones	Savannah Sanders	3.1	4	2	1	2	0	14	18
Iowa State Cyclones	Emma Hylen (L)	2.2	4	2	0	2	1	11	13
