= 2016 Big South Conference softball tournament =

- Teams: 9
- Format: Double-elimination tournament
- Finals site: Terry Field; Rock Hill, South Carolina
- Champions: Longwood (3rd title)
- Winning coach: Kathy Riley (3rd title)
- MVP: Sydney Gay (Longwood)
- Television: Big South Network, ESPN3

The 2016 Big South Conference softball tournament were held at Winthrop University's Terry Field from May 11 through May 14, 2016. Longwood won their second straight tournament championship, and the third of their four years in the conference, earning the conference's automatic bid to the 2016 NCAA Division I softball tournament. The first and second rounds were streamed online through the Big South Network, while the semifinals and championship were streamed on ESPN3.

== Seeds ==
The nine conference teams which sponsor college softball all received bids. The bottom two seeds have a play-in game to determine who will advance to face the top seeded team. Teams will be seeded by record within the conference, with a tiebreaker system to seed teams with identical conference records.

Seed	School	Conference	Overall	Tiebreaker
1	Longwood‡	19–5	33–17	
2	Coastal Carolina	18–6	35–20	
3	Liberty	16–8	30–26	
4	Radford	13–11	32–24	
5	Campbell	11–13	25–29	
6	Presbyterian	10–14	24–26	2–1 vs. Charleston Southern
7	Charleston Southern	10–14	22–32	1–2 vs. Presbyterian
8	Gardner-Webb	7–17	21–32	
9	Winthrop	4–20	14–41	
‡ – Big South regular season champions. Overall records are as of the end of the regular season.

== Tournament ==
=== 8/9 Elimination game ===
Elimination Game; May 11th Big South Network
8	Gardner–Webb	5
9	Winthrop	9

=== Double-elimination tournament ===
1st Round; May 11th and 12th Big South Network
1	Longwood	13
9	Winthrop	5 ^{(6)}
4	Radford	2
5	Campbell	11
4	Radford	4
9	Winthrop	3
2	Coastal Carolina	14
7	Charleston Southern	10
3	Liberty	3
6	Presbyterian	0
6	Presbyterian	8
7	Charleston Southern	5

2nd Round; May 12th and 13th Big South Network
1	Longwood	2
5	Campbell	5
3	Liberty	1
4	Radford	2
2	Coastal Carolina	8
3	Liberty	0 ^{(5)}
1	Longwood	4
6	Presbyterian	0

Semifinals; May 13th and 14th ESPN3
4	Radford	8	3
5	Campbell	4	6
1	Longwood	5	10
2	Coastal Carolina	0	2 ^{(5)}

Championship; May 14th ESPN3
1	Longwood	10
5	Campbell	0 ^{(5)}

- All times listed are Eastern Daylight Time.
