= 2015 Big South Conference softball tournament =

- Teams: 9
- Format: Double-elimination tournament
- Finals site: Amanda Littlejohn Stadium; Buies Creek, North Carolina
- Champions: Longwood (2nd title)
- Winning coach: Kathy Riley (2nd title)
- MVP: Libby Morris (Longwood)
- Television: Big South Network, ESPN3

The 2015 Big South Conference softball tournament was held at Amanda Littlejohn Stadium in Buies Creek, North Carolina, from May 7 through May 10, 2015. The tournament winner, Longwood, earned the Big South Conference's automatic bid to the 2015 NCAA Division I softball tournament, where they defeated Virginia Tech but were eliminated by Tennessee and Utah.

== Format ==
The Big South has two single elimination games. An 8 vs. 9 play-in game is held as single elimination. The championship is also single elimination. All other games are double elimination.

== Tournament ==
=== 8/9 Elimination Game ===
Elimination Game; May 7th Big South Network
8	Radford	6
9	Gardner-Webb	8^{(9)}

=== Double Elimination Tournament ===
1st Round; May 7 & 8th Big South Network
1	Longwood	15
9	Gardner-Webb	2^{(5)}
4	Liberty	3
5	Charleston Southern	4
4	Liberty	9
9	Gardner-Webb	4
2	Coastal Carolina	4
7	Campbell	3
3	Winthrop	1
6	Presbyterian	6
3	Winthrop	3
7	Campbell	2

2nd Round; May 8th Big South Network
1	Longwood	3
5	Charleston Southern	2^{(8)}
2	Coastal Carolina	7
4	Liberty	5
2	Coastal Carolina	3
6	Presbyterian	5
5	Charleston Southern	9
3	Winthrop	1^{(5)}

Semifinals; May 9th ESPN3
1	Longwood	5	–
2	Coastal Carolina	2	–
6	Presbyterian	5	–
5	Charleston Southern	1	–

Championship; May 10th ESPN3
1	Longwood	4
6	Presbyterian	0

- All times listed are Eastern Daylight Time.
