= 2017 Big South Conference softball tournament =

- The semifinal between Longwood and Liberty.
- Teams: 6
- Format: Double-elimination tournament
- Finals site: Lancer Field; Farmville, Virginia
- Champions: Longwood (4th title)
- Winning coach: Kathy Riley (4th title)
- MVP: Elizabeth McCarthy (Longwood)
- Television: Big South Network, ESPN3

The 2017 Big South Conference softball tournament was held at Longwood University's Lancer Field from May 10 through May 14, 2017. Following the departure of Coastal Carolina for the Sun Belt Conference, the Big South reconfigured the tournament to a six-team event. Longwood won their third straight tournament, and fourth of their five seasons in the conference, becoming the first tournament host to win since Radford in 2008.

== Seeds ==
The top two seeds had byes to the second round. Teams were seeded by record within the conference, with a tiebreaker system to seed teams with identical conference records.

Seed	School	Conference	Overall	Tiebreaker
1	Liberty‡	16–5	35–20	
2	Campbell	13–8	29–25	2–1 vs. Longwood
3	Longwood	13–8	24–26	1–2 vs. Campbell
4	Charleston Southern	10–11	25–34	
5	Winthrop	9–12	24–29	
6	Radford	8–13	27–26	
‡ – Big South regular season champions. Overall records are as of the end of the regular season.

== Tournament ==
First Round; May 10th Big South Network	Second Round; May 11th Big South Network	Semifinals; May 13th ESPN3	Championship; May 13th and 14th ESPN3
1	Liberty	11
4	Charleston Southern	5	4	Charleston Southern	3 ^{(5)}
5	Winthrop	4	1	Liberty	4
3	Longwood	7
2	Campbell	4
3	Longwood	6	3	Longwood	8
6	Radford	1
1	Liberty	9	2
3	Longwood	3	4
Lower round 1	Lower round 2	Lower round 3	Lower final
1	Liberty	9
2	Campbell	5	5	Winthrop	3
4	Charleston Southern	0	5	Winthrop	13
5	Winthrop	5	5	Winthrop	8
6	Radford	0

- All times listed are Eastern Daylight Time.
