= National Invitational Softball Championship =

- Sport: College Softball
- Founded: 2016
- Founder: National Fastpitch Coaches Association
- First season: 2017
- No. of teams: 8 possible bids
- Country: USA
- Most recent champion: Iowa (2023)
- Most titles: 5 way tie (1)
- Related competitions: NCAA Division I Softball Championship
- Website: http://www.womensnisc.com

The National Invitational Softball Championship (NISC) is a postseason women's college softball tournament sponsored by the National Fastpitch Coaches Association (NFCA) and operated by Triple Crown Sports, Inc., a company that produces events for college and youth athletics. The tournament is for NCAA Division I teams that did not qualify for the NCAA Division I Softball Championship. Announced in December 2016, there are to be thirty-two automatic qualifiers from the thirty-two NCAA-sanctioned conferences and sixteen at-large teams selected on the basis of their RPI ranking and/or their season's performance (i.e. won-lost record, record versus top-50 teams).

== History ==
In September 2016, the National Fastpitch Coaches Association (NFCA) and Triple Crown Sports joined together to bring about the National Invitational Softball Championships, a 48-team postseason Division-I event designed to highlight the growth of women's softball and the depth of talent on college rosters from coast to coast.

Although the tournament is designed to feature forty-eight teams in eight six-team regional tournaments, in the inaugural season of 2017, most teams had already allocated their resources for the season before the tournament was announced and opted out of consideration for invitations. As a result, that first tournament had only 26 teams in six regional competitions.

The tournament was canceled in 2024 due to a lack of "sufficient team demand", and a decision on its future will be made later in the year.

== Tournament play and team selection ==
Source =

New in 2022, the tournament is designed to feature eight-twelve teams in a Super Regional and Championship Round. The regional and Finals competitions are double-elimination tournaments will be held in Fort Collins, Colorado at the Triple Crown Sports Facility on TC Colorado Field.

Thirty-two (32) automatic qualifier (AQ) spots in the NISC are offered to best teams available in each of the NCAA's 32 conferences after the NCAA Tournament committee makes its picks for the NCAA Division I Softball Championship. These AQs are the highest-finishing teams in their conference's regular-season standings that are not selected for the NCAA Tournament without regard for the team's overall record. If an AQ team declines the NISC invitation, then the conference forfeits its AQ spot, and that berth goes into the NISC at-large pool.

The at-large spots in the NISC will be filled by the top teams available. All teams from Division I shall be considered, although any team considered for an at-large berth must have an overall record of .500 or better or a top 50 final NET. Overall record shall include conference tournament games.

First-round regional pairings are determined by NET.

Teams from the same conference will not meet in the first round.

Site selection for all tournament games is the sole responsibility of the NISC.

== Champions ==
National Invitational Softball Championship
Year	Host City (University)	Host Stadium	Final			Semifinalists
Year	Host City (University)	Host Stadium	Winner	Scores	Runner-up	Semifinalists
2017	Lynchburg, VA (Liberty University)	Kamphuis Field at Liberty Softball Stadium	Liberty Lady Flames	8–5; 3–1^{(5)#}	Lamar Cardinals	Lamar Cardinals & Kennesaw State Owls
2018	Los Angeles, CA (Loyola Marymount University)	Smith Field	Loyola Marymount Lions	2–0; 5–0	UC Riverside Highlanders	Eastern Kentucky Colonels & UT Arlington Mavericks
2019	Fort Collins, CO	TC Colorado Field	UT Arlington Mavericks	4-3	Iowa State Cyclones	Liberty Lady Flames & Loyola Marymount Lions
2020	No tournament due to the COVID-19 Pandemic.					
2021	No tournament due to the COVID-19 Pandemic.					
2022	Fort Collins, CO	TC Colorado Field	Baylor Bears	4-0	UNLV	Kansas Lady Jayhawks & Central Arkansas Sugar Bears
2023	Fort Collins, CO	TC Colorado Field	Iowa Hawkeyes	9-7	BYU Cougars	South Dakota State Jackrabbits & Maryland Terrapins

^{#} Game 2 called after 5 innings for inclement weather.
