= TYQ =

TYQ may refer to:

- Indianapolis Executive Airport (FAA LID: TYQ), a public airport in Boone County, Indiana, United States
- Tianyuan District (Division code: TYQ), Zhuzhou City, Hunan, China
