= 2017 National Invitational Softball Championship =

College softball tournament

- Season: 2017
- Teams: 26
- Format: Double Elimination
- Finals site: Kamphuis Field at Liberty Softball Stadium, Lynchburg, VA
- Champions: Liberty (1st title)
- Runner-up: Lamar (1st title game)
- Winning coach: Dot Richardson (1st title)
- MVP: Tori Zavodny (Liberty)

The 2017 National Invitational Softball Championship (NISC) began on May 16, 2017 and concluded on May 24. The Liberty University Lady Flames defeated the Lamar University Lady Cardinals in a controversial rain-shortened two-game final on Liberty's home.field in Lynchburg, Virginia.

== Tournament play and team selection ==
The NISC tournament is designed to feature forty-eight teams in eight six-team regional tournaments with the regional champions advancing to a National Finals tournament. The regionals and the Finals are double-elimination competitions.

For the inaugural tournament, only fifteen of the thirty-two NCAA conferences sent an automatic qualifier (AQ). Seven schools having non-losing records and RPIs in the top 100 entered the tournament with "National RPI" bids. Four other teams with non-losing records against challenging schedules were added as "At-large" teams. The twenty-six teams were placed in six regional tournaments of four or five teams. The six regional champions advanced to the National Finals at Liberty University, a site that was determined after the regional competitions.

== Brackets ==
The six regional tournaments were played May 16–18, 2017.

The regional and finals competitions were double-elimination tournaments.

NISC	Region († = host)					
Place	1 Stockton, CA	2 Ogden, UT	3 Normal, IL	4 Beaumont, TX	5 Atlanta, GA	6 Lynchburg, VA
1st	Cal Poly Mustangs	Weber State Wildcats †	Illinois State Redbirds †	Lamar Lady Cardinals †	Kennesaw State Owls	Liberty Lady Flames †
2nd	Nevada Wolf Pack	Boise State Broncos	Michigan State Spartans	Louisiana–Monroe Warhawks	Georgia State Panthers †	Ohio Bobcats
3rdt	Pacific Tigers †	Utah State Aggies	Murray State Racers	Abilene Christian Wildcats	Western Kentucky Lady Toppers	UNC Wilmington Seahawks
4th	UC Santa Barbara Gauchos	San Diego Toreros	IUPUI Jaguars	Texas–Arlington Mavericks	Alabama State Lady Hornets	Iona Gaels
5th	—	—	—	—	UT Martin Skyhawks	Campbell Lady Camels

The inaugural National Invitational Softball Championship finals were played May 21–24, 2017 at Liberty University in Lynchburg, Virginia. Teams were seeded by their RPIs.

Upper round 1
5	Weber State	3
4	Liberty	2
3	Cal Poly	6
6	Lamar	8
Lower round 1
2	Illinois State	0
4	Liberty	3
5	Weber State	0
3	Cal Poly	9^{(6)}

Upper round 2
1	Kennesaw State	4
5	Weber State	0
6	Lamar	2
2	Illinois State	1
Lower round 2
4	Liberty	3
3	Cal Poly	0

Upper final
1	Kennesaw State	4
6	Lamar	5
Lower final
1	Kennesaw State	5
4	Liberty	13

Final
6	Lamar	5
4	Liberty	8

- # = Game called after 5 innings for inclement weather.

=== Championship Game ===
School	Top Batter	Stats.
Liberty Flames	Deidra See (DP)	1-3 2RBIs 2B
Lamar Cardinals	Kelly Meeuwsen (2B)	1-3 RBI

School	Pitcher	IP	H	R	ER	BB	SO	AB	BF
Liberty Flames	Julie DiMartino (W)	5.0	3	1	1	4	4	20	24
Lamar Cardinals	Laura Napoli (L)	3.1	5	3	3	2	1	15	18
Lamar Cardinals	Anissa Rodriguez	1.2	0	0	0	0	2	5	5

== Finals controversy ==
The tournament had been plagued all week by intermittent heavy rains, In the first Liberty–Lamar Finals game, Lamar had a 5–4 lead after six innings, but Liberty scored four seventh inning runs on their home field to win 8–5. Lamar coach Holly Bruder did not want to start the decisive game because of the threatening weather, but tournament director Dave King opted to have the game played, since it was the last day that had been scheduled for the tournament. In the second Finals game, Lamar scored four runs in the top half of the sixth inning to take a 5–3 lead. With two outs in the bottom of the inning, the rains resumed, soaking the field and making it unplayable. Under NCAA rules, in such a situation, the score reverts to the end of the last completed inning. Lamar's four runs were negated, and Liberty was declared the winner of the deciding game, 3–1, giving the Flames the inaugural NISC tournament. The decision to call the game was made only nineteen minutes after the rains hit, despite the fact that a games on the previous day had been delayed for an hour in one case and four and a half hours in another. As soon as the decision was announced, softball fans around the country and officials of Lamar's Southland Conference were irate. "Nobody foresaw this situation would happen," King said. "You can blame me for this."

== 2017 NISC All-Tournament Team ==
Source =

Cal Poly
- Sierra Hyland
- Crimson Kaiser
- Chelsea Convissar

Illinois State

- Allison Spence
- Sarah Finck
- Riley Strandgard

Kennesaw State

- Alley Cutting
- Courtney Sutter
- Noelle Winkles

Lamar

- Ciara Luna
- Ashley McDowell
- Brynn Baca

Liberty

- Kenzie Friesen
- Amber Bishop
- Tori Zavodny - Tournament MVP

Weber State

- Kirtlyn Bohling
- Takesha Saltern
- KyRae Kogianes

== See also ==
- National Invitational Softball Championship
- NCAA Division I Softball Championship
