= 2018 Big South Conference softball tournament =

- Teams: 6
- Format: Double-elimination tournament
- Finals site: Radford Softball Stadium; Radford, Virginia
- Champions: Liberty (3rd title)
- Winning coach: Dot Richardson (1st title)
- MVP: Autumn Bishop (Liberty)
- Television: Big South Network, ESPN+, ESPN3

The 2018 Big South Conference softball tournament was held at Radford University's Radford Softball Stadium from May 9 through May 12, 2018. As in the previous year, the tournament was a six-team field. Liberty won their third ever title, and received an automatic bid to the 2018 NCAA Division I softball tournament.

== Seeds ==
The top two seeds, Liberty and Longwood, had byes to the second round. Teams were seeded by record within the conference, with a tiebreaker system to seed teams with identical conference records.

Seed	School	Conference	Overall	Tiebreaker
1	Liberty‡	18–3	44–12	
2	Longwood	17–4	37–14	
3	Radford	13–8	33–17	
4	Campbell	12–9	26–25	
5	Gardner–Webb	8–13	28–27	
6	Winthrop	7–14	17–30	2–1 vs Charleston Southern
‡ – Big South regular season champions. Overall records are as of the end of the regular season.

== Tournament ==
First Round; May 9th Big South Network	Second Round; May 10th ESPN+	Semifinals; May 11th ESPN3	Championship; May 12th ESPN3
1	Liberty	8
4	Campbell	5	5	Gardner–Webb	2
5	Gardner–Webb	11	1	Liberty	2:30 pm
3	Radford	ESPN3
2	Longwood	1
3	Radford	3	3	Radford	4
6	Winthrop	2
1	Liberty	5	—
3	Radford	1	—
Lower round 1	Lower round 2	Lower round 3	Lower final
2	Longwood	2
2	Longwood	6	3	Radford	3^{(12)}
4	Campbell	12^{(6)}	4	Campbell	5
4	Campbell	12^{(5)}	5	Gardner–Webb	4
6	Winthrop	2

- All times listed are Eastern Daylight Time.
