= Holly Bruder =

American college softball coach

Biographical details
- Born: 1977 (age 48–49); Rogers City, Michigan, U.S.

Playing career
- 1996–1999: Alma
- Position: Third base

Coaching career (HC unless noted)
- 2000: Albion (asst.)
- 2001: Bluffton (asst.)
- 2002–2007: Denison
- 2008–2011: Morehead State
- 2013–2018: Lamar

Head coaching record
- Overall: 427–375 (.532)
- Tournaments: 2–4 (NCAA D-III); 3–2 (NISC)

Accomplishments and honors

Championships
- 4× NCAC regular season (2002, 2003, 2006, 2007); 2× NCAC Tournament (2002, 2006)

Holly Jean Bruder (born 1977) is an American college softball coach. She most recently served as head coach at Lamar from 2013 to 2018. From 2008 to 2011, she served as head coach at NCAA Division I Morehead State. Prior to the seasons at Morehead State, she served as head coach at NCAA Division III Denison University for six years (2002–2007). Before her head coaching assignments, Bruder was assistant coach at Bluffton College in 2001 after beginning her college coaching career as an assistant coach at Albion College (1999–2000).

== Playing career ==
Bruder played softball for Rogers City High School in Rogers City, Michigan. She played softball and soccer at Alma College, specifically at third base in softball. In 1999, her team advanced to the NCAA Division III College World Series finishing in third place.

== Coaching career ==
=== Assistant coach ===
Bruder served as Assistant Coach for 1 year (2000) on the Albion College staff serving as assistant softball coach. In 2001, she moved to Bluffton College where she served as Head Coach for the tennis team and Assistant Coach for the softball team.

=== Denison ===
Bruder served as Head Coach for the Denison University Big Red softball team from 2002 to 2007. She compiled a record of 145–105 at Denison leading the Big Red to four conference regular season titles and two appearances in the NCAA Division III tournament.

=== Morehead State ===
In 2008, Bruder took over head coaching duties for the Morehead State Eagles softball team. Her first Eagles team finished in 2nd place in the Ohio Valley Conference, the Eagles's highest finish in the history of the program. Her first two teams at Morehead State set school overall winning records of 34 in 2008 and 35 in 2009. Bruder's overall record at Morehead State from 2008 to 2011 was 115–96.

=== Lamar ===
On April 22, 2011, Athletic Director Larry Tidwell announced plans to reinstate college softball as an NCAA Division I sport at Lamar University. On August 1, 2011, former Morehead State head coach Holly Bruder was announced as the finalist to fill the head coaching position at Lamar after over 20 years without a program. The Lady Cardinals finished fifth in the Southland Conference in their first season of competition (2012–13) following the restart of the program. The team also earned a berth in the Southland Conference softball tournament.

On May 11, 2018, Lamar fired Bruder after a player's complaint that a member of the coaching staff forced her to eat meat during Lent, a claim disputed by multiple other players. Lamar placed Bruder on administrative leave around two weeks earlier. In an email to the player, Lamar athletic director Marco Born stated that Lamar "could and should have done a better job of respecting [her] expression of [her] faith." The following week, Bruder filed a formal appeal with Lamar.

== Head coaching record ==
Combined source:

Source for Denison:

Source for Morehead State:

Record table
Season	Team	Overall	Conference	Standing	Postseason
Denison Big Red (North Coast Athletic Conference) (2002–2007)
2002	Denison	27–14	12–3	1st	NCAA D-III Regional
2003	Denison	24–18	12–2	1st	
2004	Denison	10–26	4–10	7th	
2005	Denison	21–19	8–8	4th	
2006	Denison	33–13	11–3	1st	NCAA D-III Regional
2007	Denison	30–15	13–1	1st	
Denison:		145–105 (.580)	60–27 (.690)		
Morehead State Eagles (Ohio Valley Conference) (2008–2011)
2008	Morehead State	34–16	16–9	2nd	
2009	Morehead State	35–20	15–8	3rd	
2010	Morehead State	27–24	14–9	3rd	
2011	Morehead State	19–36	10–19	9th	
Morehead State:		(115–96 (.545)	55–45 (.550)		
Lamar Lady Cardinals (Southland Conference) (2013–2018)
2013	Lamar	24–35	14–13	5th	
2014	Lamar	20–30	12–14	8th	
2015	Lamar	26–28	14–10	5th	
2016	Lamar	35–22	18–9	4th	
2017	Lamar	34–31	17–10	4th	NISC Runner-Up
2018	Lamar	28–28	11–16	9th	
Lamar:		167–174 (.490)	86–72 (.544)		
Total:		427–375 (.532)			
National champion Postseason invitational champion Conference regular season champion Conference regular season and conference tournament champion Division regular season champion Division regular season and conference tournament champion Conference tournament champion

== Personal life ==
Born in Rogers City, Michigan, Bruder is formerly married to Allison Honkofsky, who played under Bruder at Morehead State in 2008 and later became an assistant coach on Bruder's staffs at Morehead State and Lamar.
