= 2026 Big South Conference softball tournament =

- Teams: 5
- Format: Double-elimination tournament
- Finals site: Cyrill Softball Stadium; Spartanburg, South Carolina
- Champions: USC Upstate (3rd title)
- Winning coach: Chris Hawkins (3rd title)
- MVP: Maddie Drerup (USC Upstate)
- Television: Big South Network, ESPN+, ESPN3

2026 Big South Conference softball standings
	Conf.				Overall
Team	W		L	PCT	W		L	PCT
Winthrop ‍†‍‍	13	–	4	.765	30	–	23	.566
USC Upstate ‍‍‡‍^{y}	12	–	6	.667	36	–	21	.632
Radford ‍‍‍	10	–	8	.556	24	–	27	.471
Presbyterian ‍‍‍	8	–	10	.444	20	–	32	.385
Gardner-Webb ‍‍‍	8	–	10	.444	32	–	25	.561
Longwood ‍‍‍	7	–	10	.412	21	–	32	.396
Charleston Southern ‍‍‍	4	–	14	.222	10	–	41	.196
† – Conference champion ‡ – Tournament champion y – Invited to the NCAA tournament As of May 9, 2026; Rankings from NFCA/USA Today

The 2026 Big South Conference softball tournament was held at Cyrill Softball Stadium on the campus of University of South Carolina Upstate in Spartanburg, South Carolina from May 6 through May 9, 2026. The tournament was won by the USC Upstate Spartans, who earned the Big South Conference's automatic bid to the 2026 NCAA Division I softball tournament.

== Format and seeding ==
The top five finishers of the league's seven teams from the round-robin regular season qualified for the tournament. The regular season winner earned a single bye, while the remaining teams played opening round games.

== Tournament ==
Upper round 1
4	Presbyterian	4
5	Gardner-Webb	6
Lower round 1
4	Presbyterian	0
3	Radford	10^{(5)}

Upper round 2
1	Winthrop	7
5	Gardner-Webb	6
2	USC Upstate	1
3	Radford	0
Lower round 2
5	Gardner-Webb	4
3	Radford	1

Upper final
1	Winthrop	1
2	USC Upstate	5
Lower final
1	Winthrop	9
5	Gardner-Webb	2

Final
2	USC Upstate	12^{(5)}	—
1	Winthrop	2	—

== All Tournament Team ==
Player	Team
**Maddie Drerup**	USC Upstate
Taliyah Thomas	USC Upstate
Carson Shaw	USC Upstate
Abby Polk	USC Upstate
Peyton Bryden	Winthrop
Grayson Buckner	Winthrop
Annelisa Winebarger	Winthrop
Alli Stidham	Gardner-Webb
Reese Collier	Gardner-Webb
Dakota Redmon	Radford
Morgan Cooper	Radford

MVP in bold
