= Lamar Softball Complex =

Stadium in Beaumont, Texas

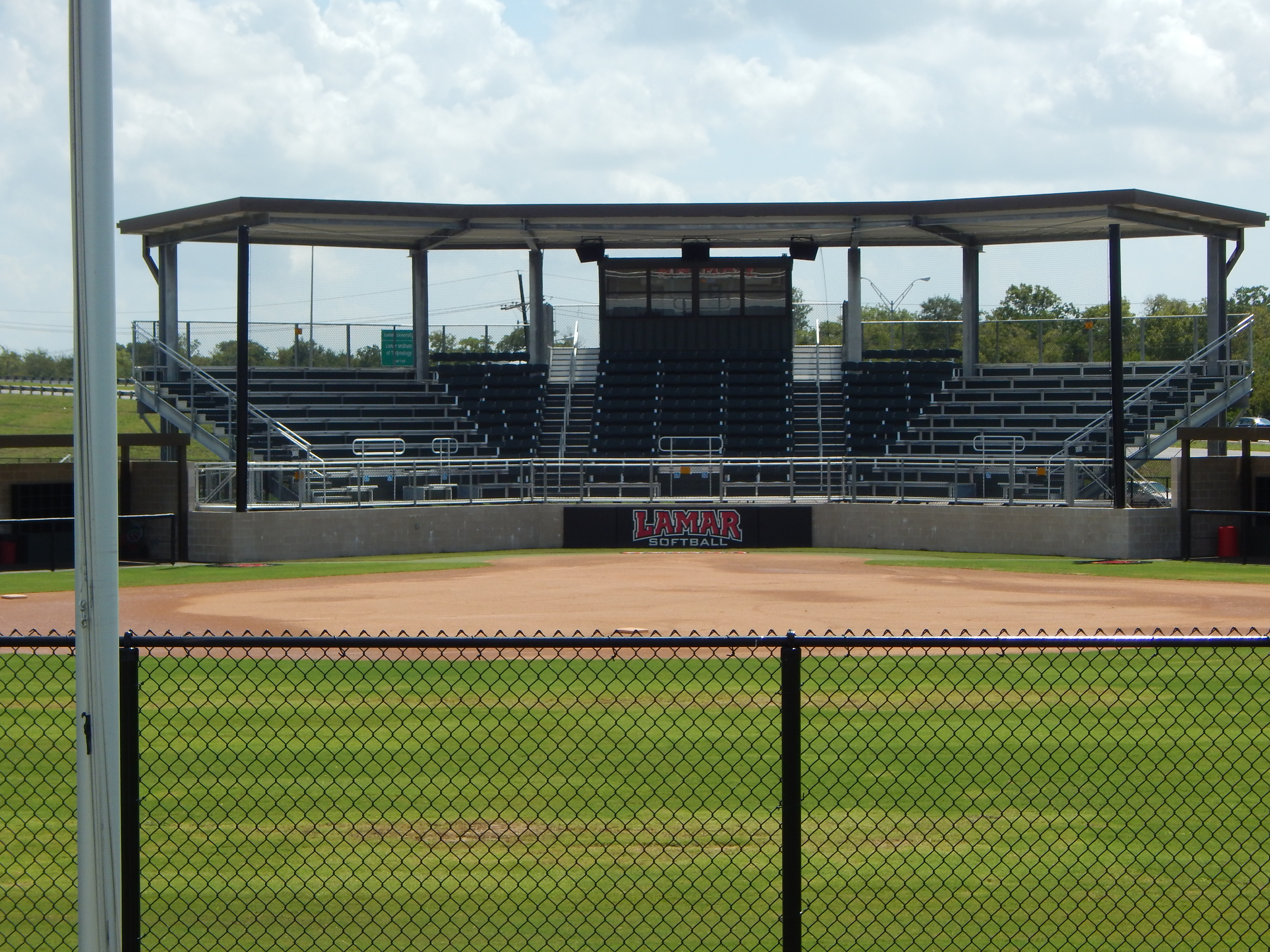
- Interactive map of Lamar Softball Complex
- Location: On Rolfe Christopher Dr north of US 69, 96, 287 Freeway (Cardinal Drive); Beaumont, Texas
- Coordinates: 30°01′59.9″N 94°04′23.4″W
- Owner: Lamar University
- Operator: Lamar University
- Seating type: 150 chairback seats 350 bleacher seats
- Capacity: 500 (not including berm seating)
- Surface: Grass
- Scoreboard: Electronic
- Record attendance: 1,273; February 8, 2025 vs Texas
- Field size: Left Field: 215 ft Center Field: 230 ft Right Field: 215 ft

Construction
- Groundbreaking: October 17, 2014
- Built: 2014–15
- Opened: March 6, 2015
- Cost: Estimated Cost: $1.5–$2.5 million
- Architects: Brown Reynolds Watford Architects, Inc.
- Main contractors: Allco, LLC

Tenant
- Lamar Lady Cardinals softball (NCAA) (2015–Present)

The Lamar Softball Complex, built in 2014–15 on the campus of Lamar University, is the home stadium for the Division I (NCAA) Lamar Lady Cardinals softball team. The stadium is located next to the Lamar Soccer Complex. The initial home game was played in the partially completed stadium with temporary spectator seating on March 6, 2015 against the Houston Baptist Huskies softball team. The current grandstands were built following the 2014–15 season's conclusion.

== Features ==
The stadium features permanent seating for 500 fans. Included in the 500 seat capacity are 150 chair back seats. To accommodate additional fans, the stadium also features a grass berm located behind the outfield fence. The berm extends from the left field line to mid right center field. The stadium also features covered seating, field lighting, bullpens, dugouts, a press box, a covered hitting area, and an electronic scoreboard. The playing field features a programmable fertilization and irrigation system.

Adjacent to the stadium site is the Lamar Soccer and Softball Complex building which houses separate areas for each sport. The building features coaches offices; home, visitors, and referees locker rooms; team meeting rooms; and training rooms. Also included is a ticket office, concession and souvenir stands, and restrooms for spectators.

Estimated cost of the softball stadium was between $1.5 million and $2.5 million. Estimated cost of the Lamar Soccer and Softball Complex building was $3.5 million according to the Texas Higher Education Coordinating Board's Capital Expenditure Plans FY 2009 to 2013 report.

== Post season tournaments ==
The Lamar Softball Complex was the Region 4 site of the 2017 NISC championship tournament.

== Yearly attendance ==
Below is the Lady Cardinals' yearly home attendance at the Lamar Softball Complex.

Season	Average	High
Yearly Home Attendance
2024-25	526	1,273
2023-24	418	750
2022-23	425	542
2021-22	249	550
2020–21	108	119*
2019–20	280**	386**
2018–19	215	467
2017–18	371	505
2016–17	301	466
2015–16	375	588
2014–15	292***	440***

*Note: Attendance restricted to 119 fans due to COVID19 precautions.
**Note: Games after March 10, 2020 cancelled due to COVID19 precautions.
***Note: Temporary seating

== Gallery ==
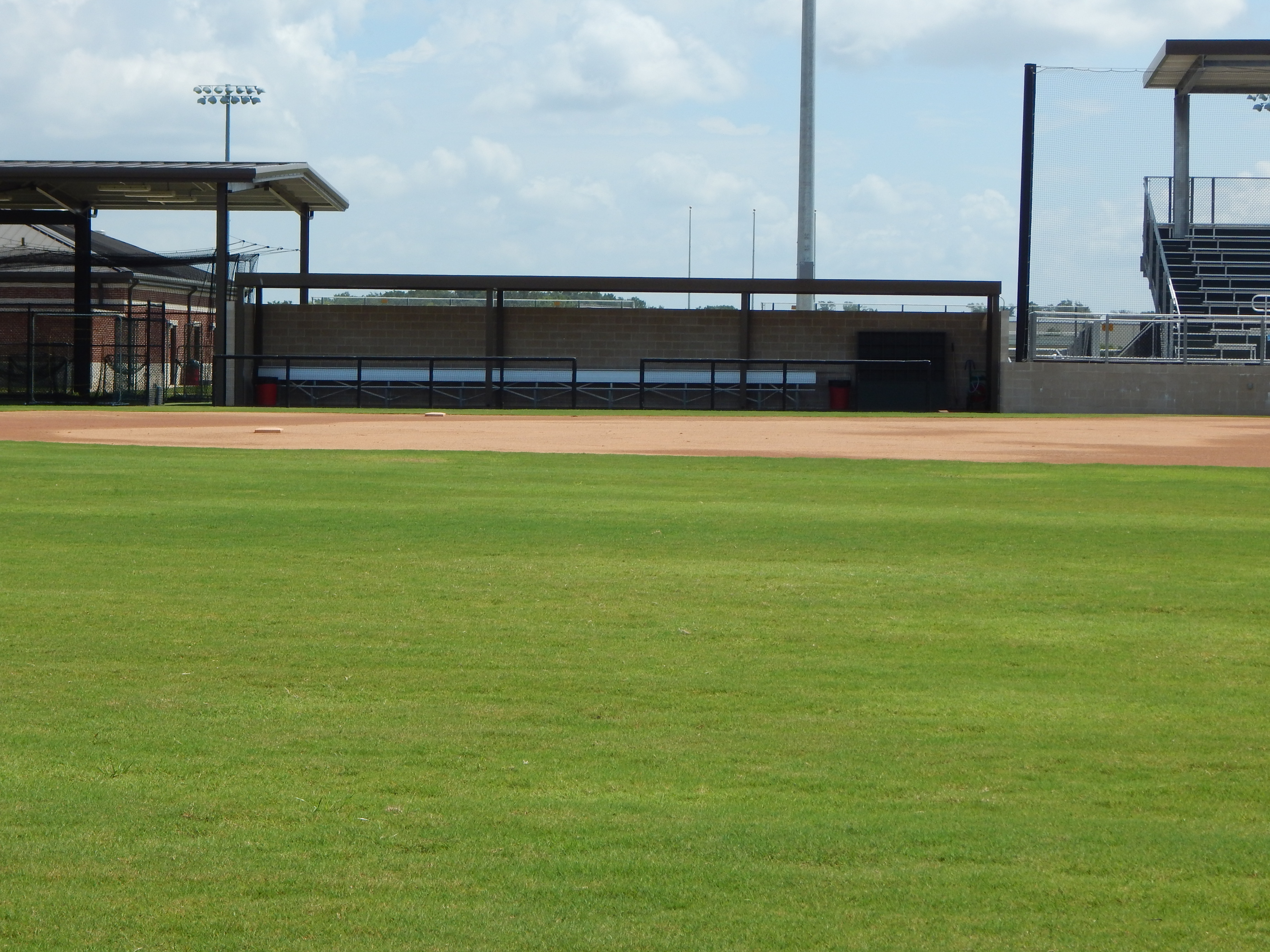
Lady Cardinals dugout

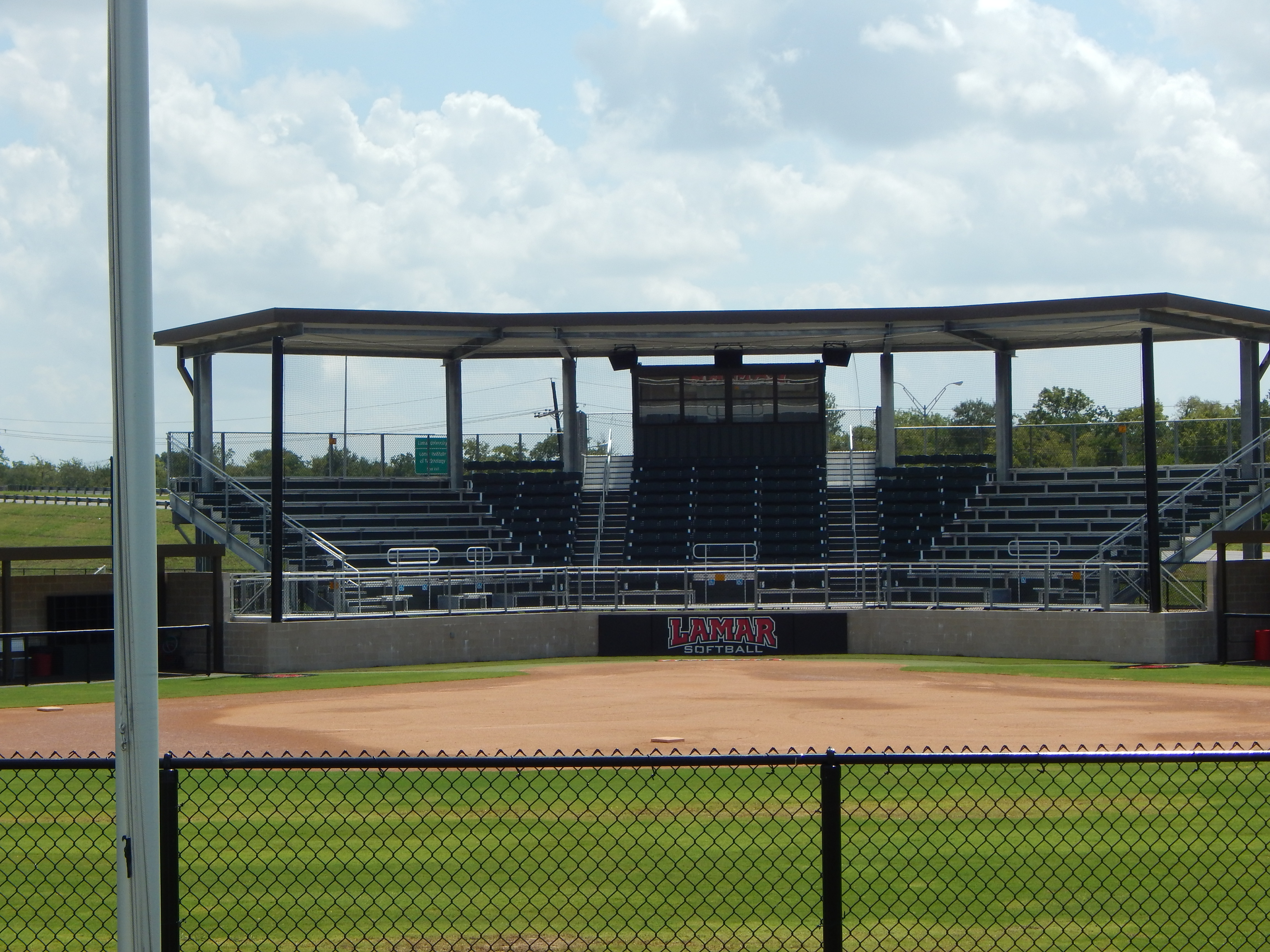
Grandstands

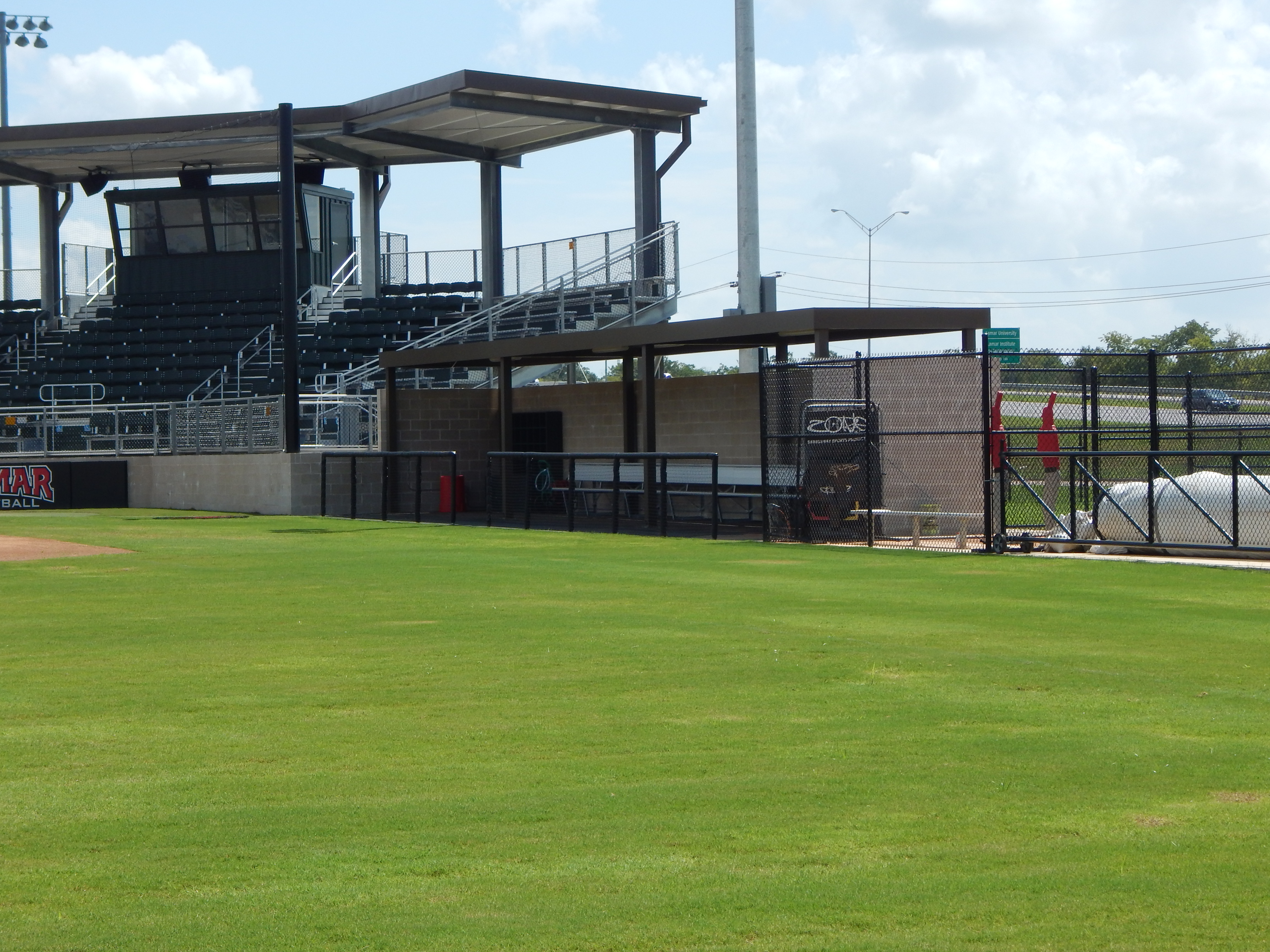
Visitor's dugout

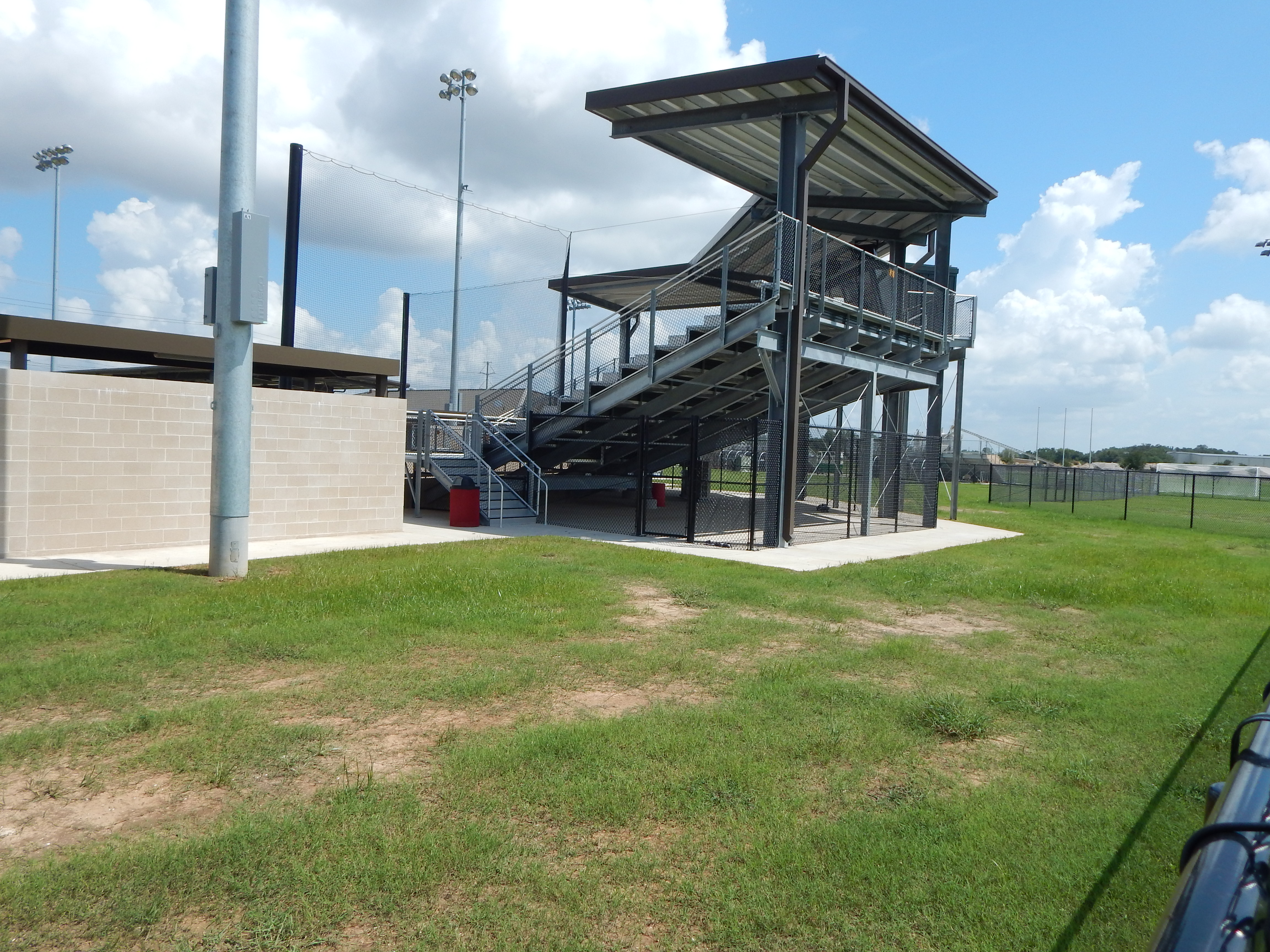
Rear view of grandstands

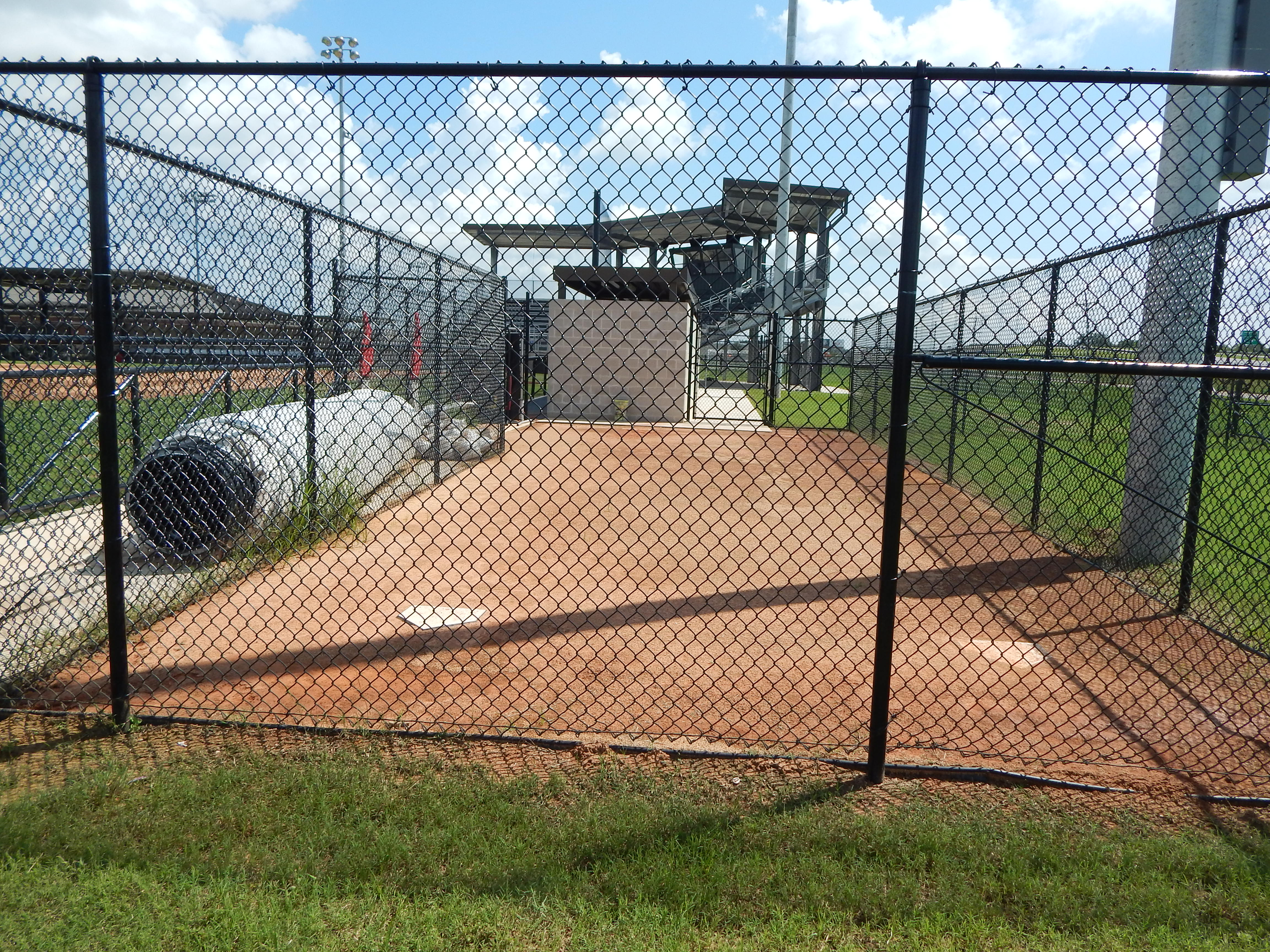
Visitor's bullpen

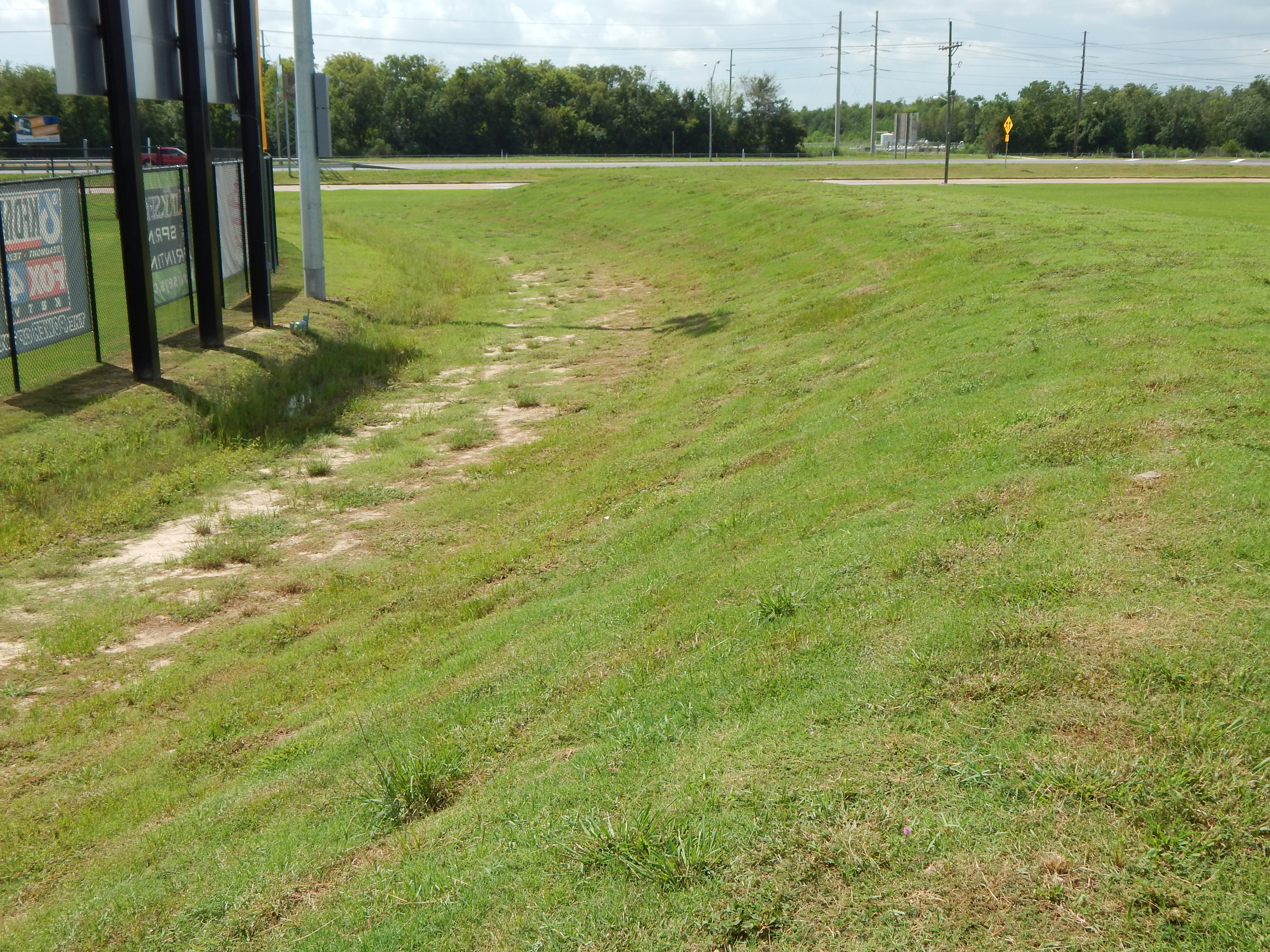
Berm toward left field line

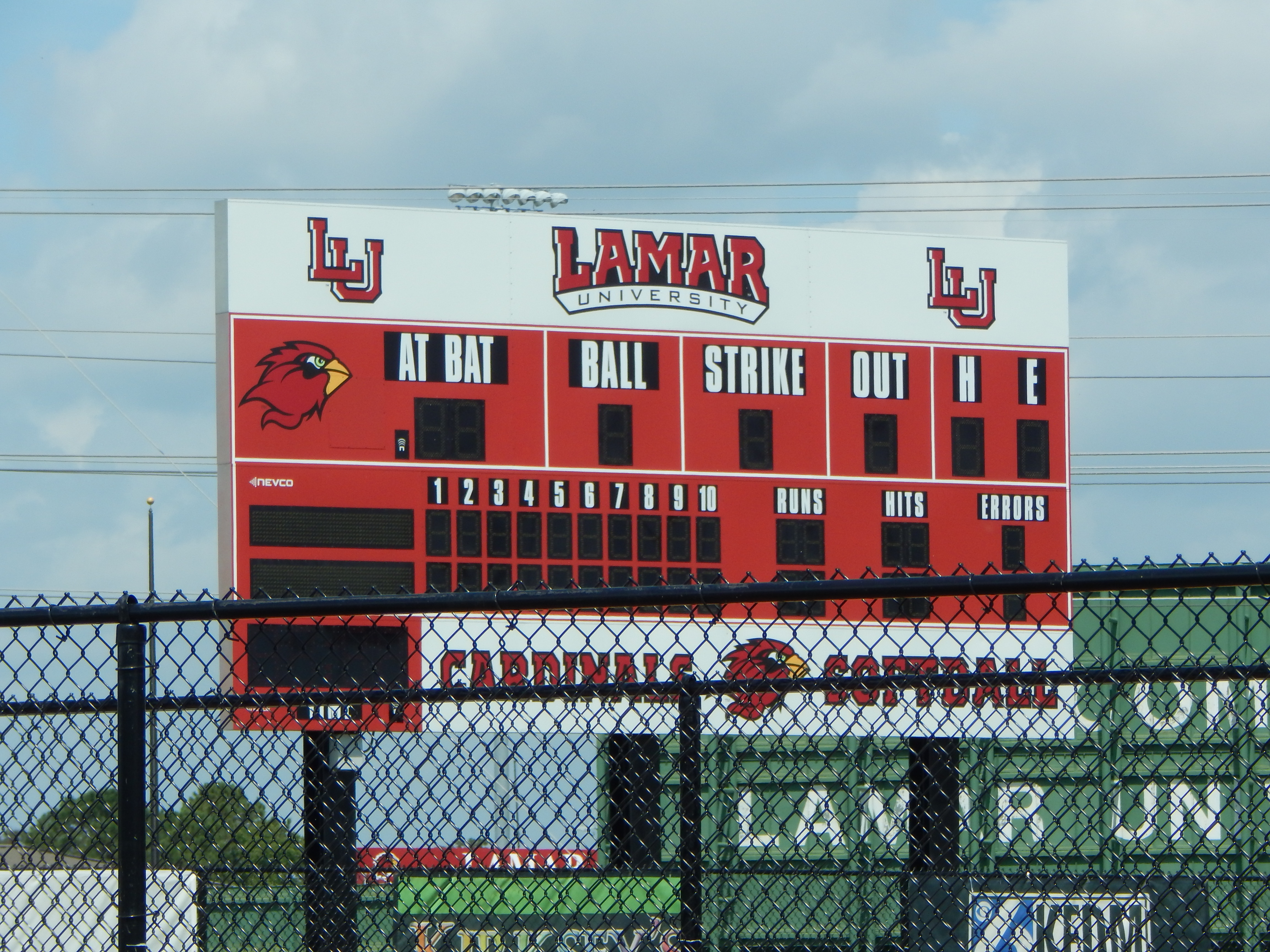
Scoreboard

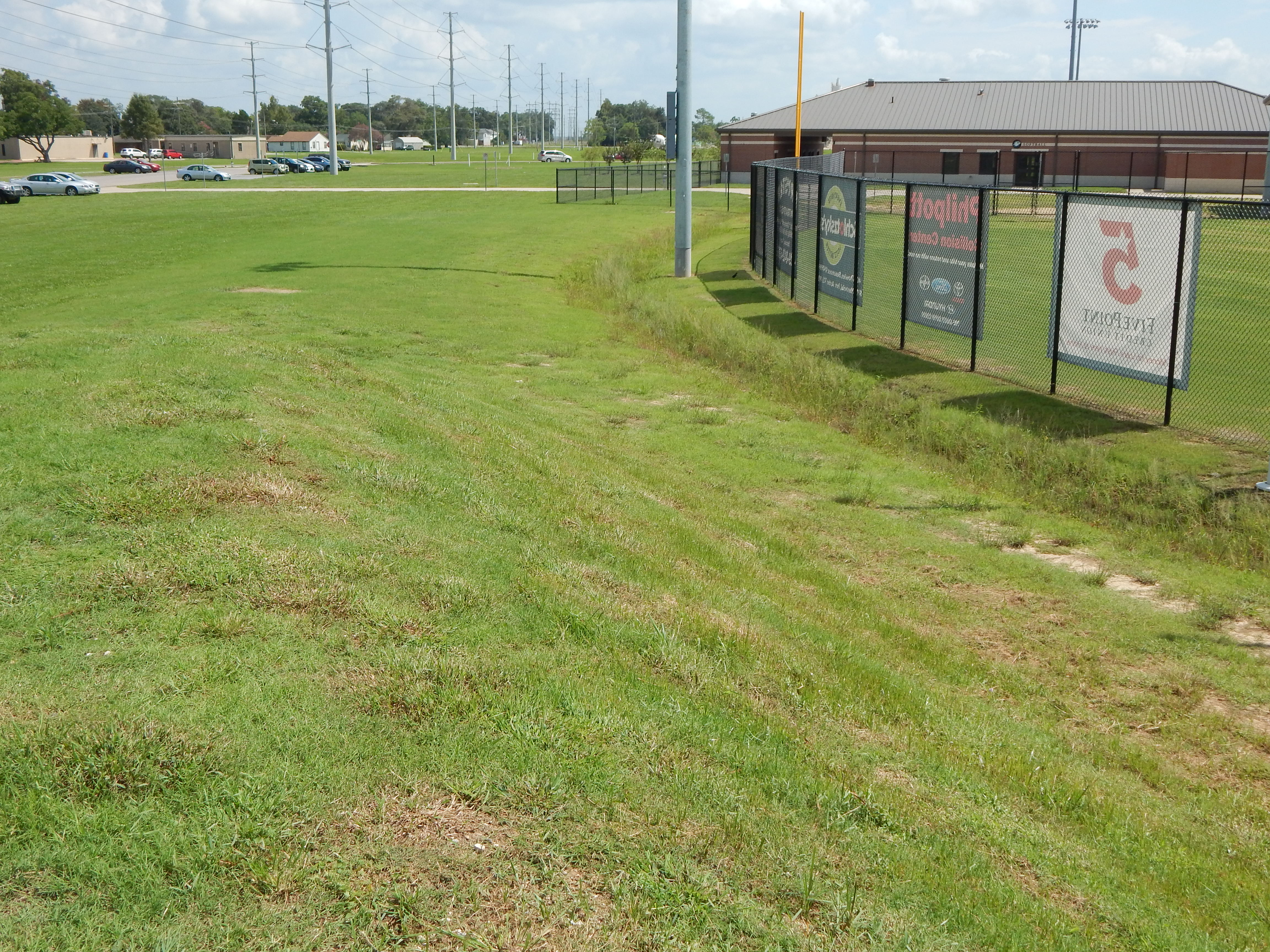
Berm toward mid right field

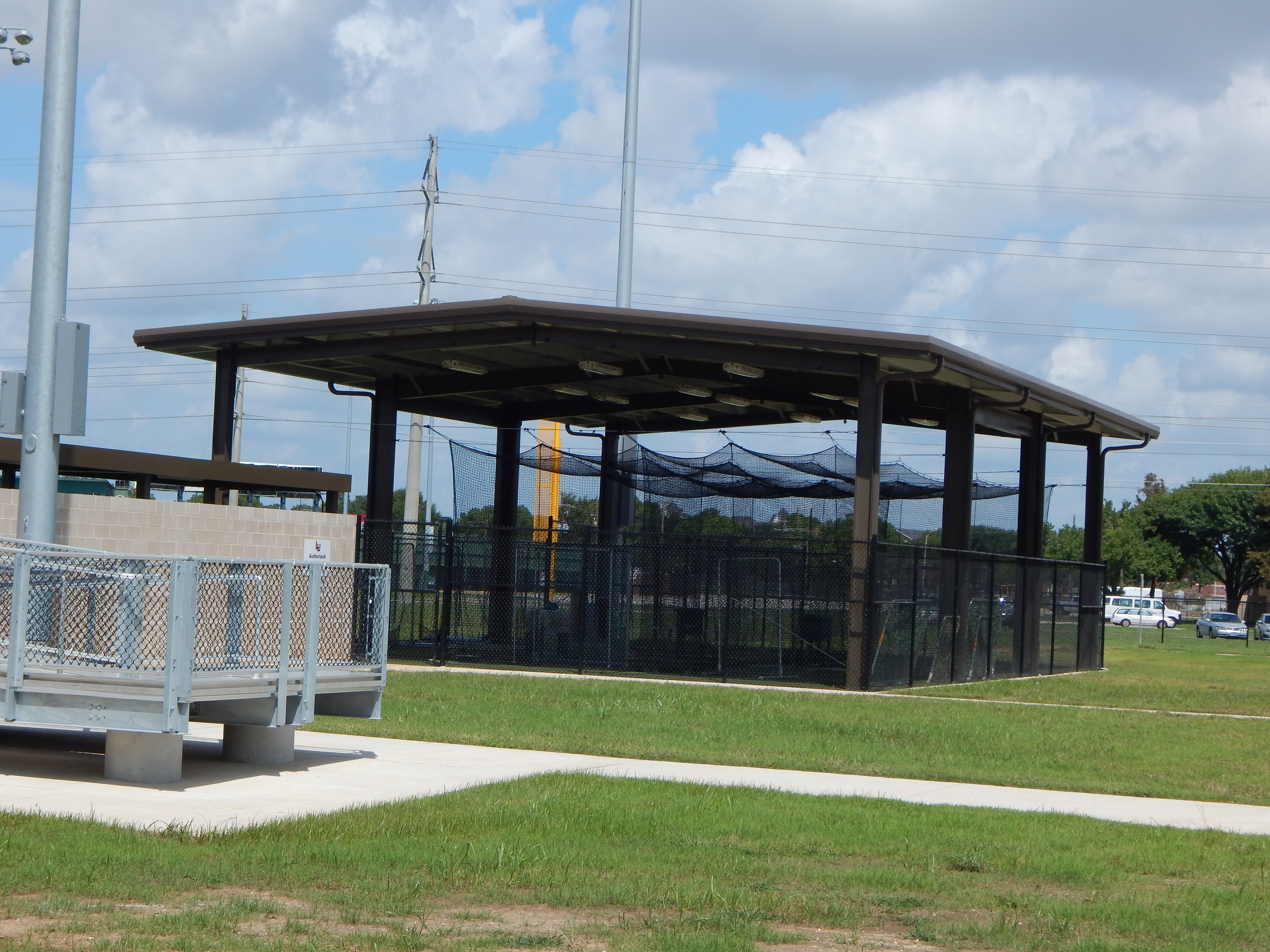
Covered hitting area

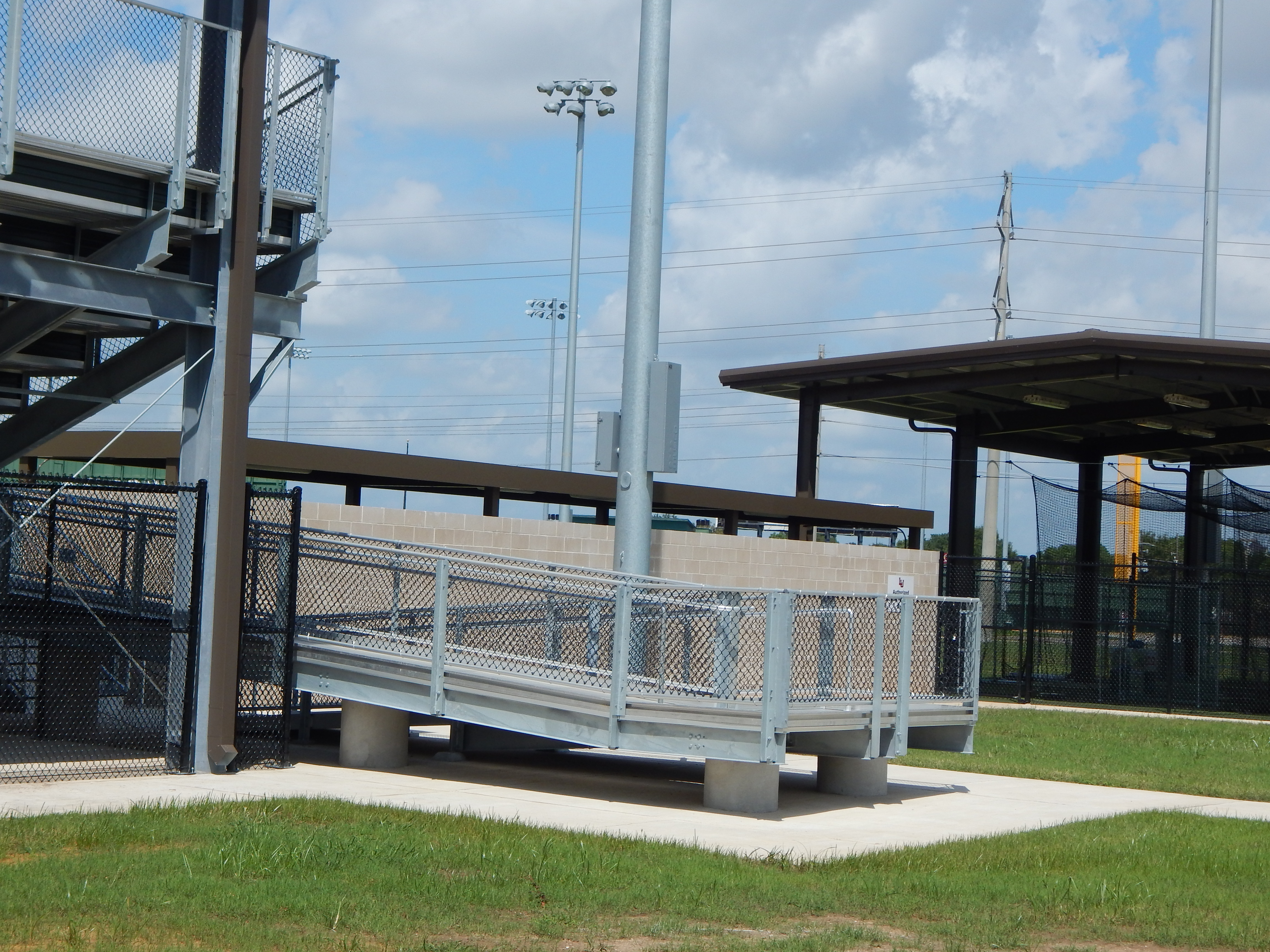
Ramp to grandstands

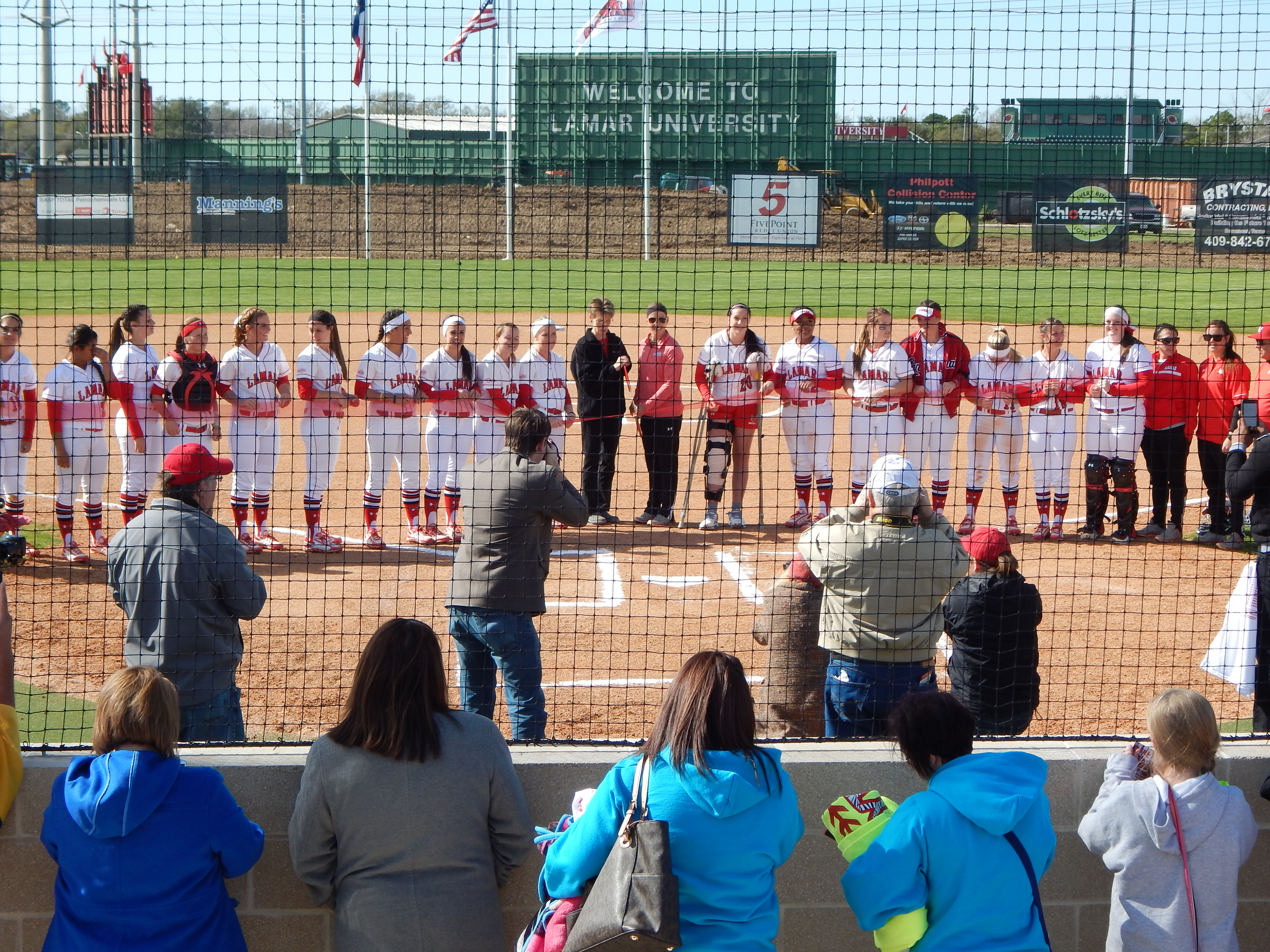
Ribbon Cutting Ceremony, March 6, 2015

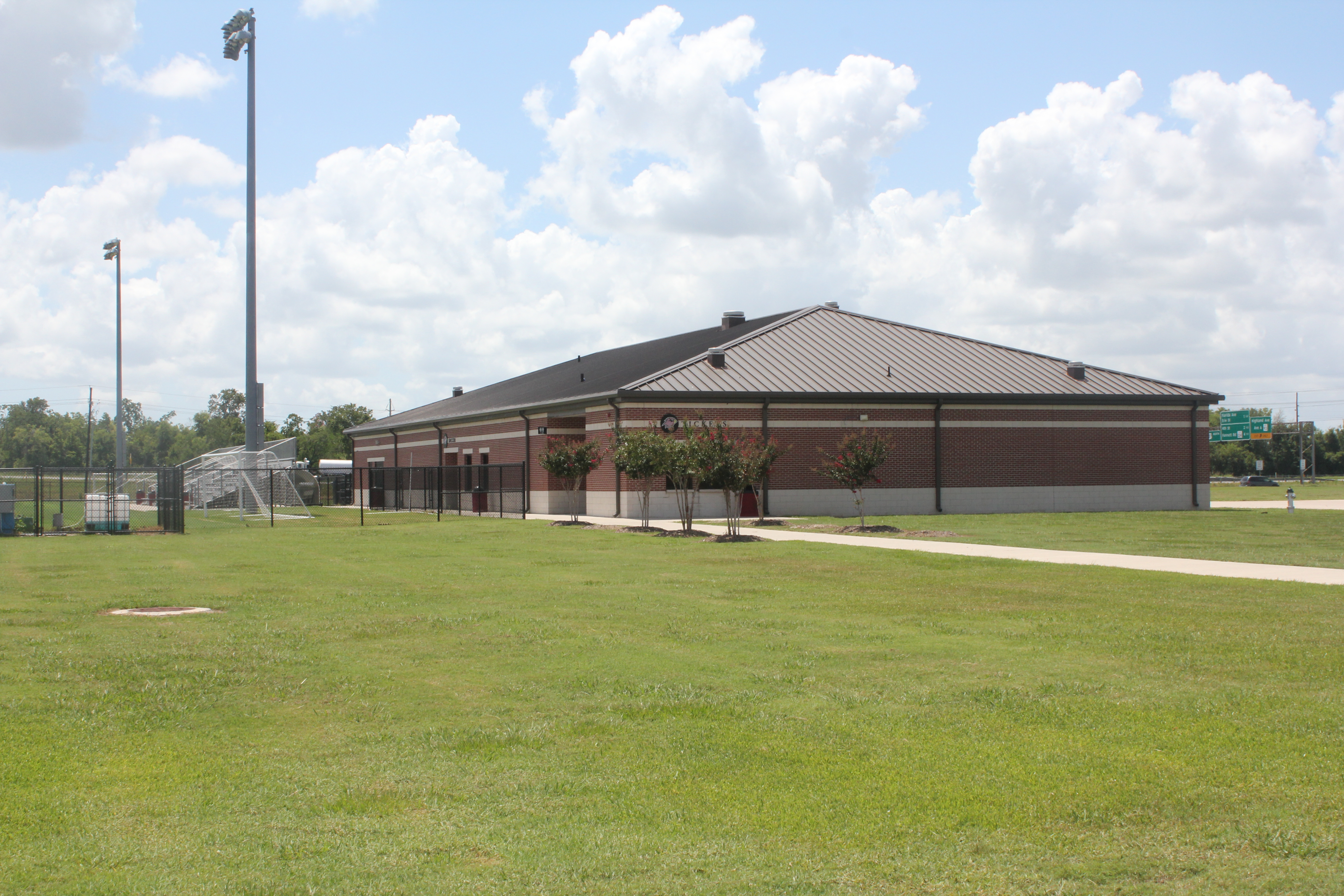
Lamar Soccer and Softball Complex Building
