= Carter Memorial Stadium =

College baseball stadium in Virginia, U.S.

Williams Field at Carter Memorial Stadium
- Interactive map of Williams Field at Carter Memorial Stadium
- Former names: Radford Baseball Field (1986-2011); Radford Baseball Stadium (2011-2017)
- Location: University Drive, Radford, Virginia, United States
- Coordinates: 37.136911°N 80.539165°W
- Owner: Radford University
- Operator: Radford University
- Capacity: 800 (seated), plus grass berm down left field line
- Surface: Tuckahoe bluegrass
- Scoreboard: Daktronics Videoboard with attached Electronic Scoreboard
- Record attendance: 1,373 (April 19, 2011)
- Field size: Left field: 330 ft Left center field: 370 ft Center field: 400 ft Right center field: 370 ft Right field: 330 ft

Construction
- Opened: 1986
- Renovated: 2009, 2011
- Cost: USD$800,000 (2011 renovations)
- Project manager: Carolina Green Corp. Athletic Field Construction (2009 field facelift)
- General contractors: Branch & Associates (2011 renovations)

Tenant
- Radford Highlanders baseball (1986-present)

Williams Field at Carter Memorial Stadium is a baseball venue on the campus of Radford University in Radford, Virginia, United States. It is home to the Radford Highlanders of the NCAA Division I Big South Conference. The field opened in 1986 and underwent extensive renovations in 2011. Its capacity is 800 spectators, with a grass area down the left field line allowing for overflow crowds.

Other uses of the stadium include baseball camps and high school baseball tournaments.

== History ==
The facility opened in 1986. In July 2007, Joe Raccuia assumed control of the program with plans for facility upgrades.

Renovations beginning in 2008 led to reconstruction of the field. In 2008, a new backstop was installed. Dugouts were enlarged and the playing surface improved in 2009.

In 2011, the venue's name was changed from Radford Baseball Field to Radford Baseball Stadium, due to major renovations. Branch and Associates, Inc. led a project to rebuild the stadium. A seating structure with 800 chair-backed seats was added, in addition to a new concourse, press box, and PA system. New stadium lighting allowed night games to be played. The construction project, which cost $800,000, was the first in Radford athletics history to use only private funding.

Construction was completed during the 2011 season. The new stadium was officially opened for the program's first-ever home night game, a sold-out crowd on April 8, 2011 against VMI. Radford set its attendance record just days later when an over-capacity crowd of 1,373 witnessed the top ranked Virginia Cavaliers play the Highlanders.

The venue changed names to Williams Field at Carter Memorial Stadium in 2017.

The naming ceremony was held on April 29, 2017. The stadium was named in memory of Sherman Carter, a longtime supporter of Radford University Athletics, while the field itself was named in honor of George Abie Williams, a financial advisor and board member who served as a significant donor to the athletics program. In 2021, the natural grass playing surface was replaced with artificial turf, funded by an anonymous donor, with construction breaking ground in November 2020 and completing in February 2021.

== See also ==
- List of NCAA Division I baseball venues
