= Lisa Seacat DeLuca =

American inventor and technology strategist at IBM

- Born: Helena, Montana
- Education: Carnegie Mellon University, University of Texas
- Scientific career
- Fields: Computer programming
- Workplaces: IBM

Lisa Seacat DeLuca is an American inventor, engineer, and children's book author.

== Early life and education ==
Lisa Seacat DeLuca grew up in Helena, Montana. She showed interest in inventing in her childhood, prototyping an umbrella that extended to the ground. Growing up, DeLuca's role model was her aunt Dot Richardson, a two-time gold medal winner for softball at the Olympics.

DeLuca received a Bachelor of Science degree in computer science from Carnegie Mellon University, and furthered her education with a Master of Science in Technology Commercialization from the University of Texas McCombs School of Business.

== Career ==
DeLuca has directed the Watson Internet of Things division at IBM since 2017, primarily focusing on digitizing assets for the digital twin. She joined the company in 2005 and filed her first patent in 2006, aiming to improve the output console for Java code. DeLuca now holds more than 500 patents in the field of software programming, making her the most prolific female inventor at IBM.

As recognition for her efforts, DeLuca was named one of the Most Influential Women in IoT in 2016, one of MIT Technology Review's 2015 list of 35 Innovators under 35, and one of Fast Company’s 2015 list of 100 Most Creative People in Business. DeLuca has also spoken at a conference about the barriers women and minorities face when entering STEM fields, stressing the importance of removing bias in STEM education and extracurriculars, as well as supporting equal pay, maternity leave, and childcare in the workplace.

Additionally, DeLuca has written two children's books, supported by a $14,000 Kickstarter campaign for their production. She attributes her inspiration to her twin children and her younger self, having wished for greater exposure to STEM concepts at a younger age.
