= Jamie Pinkerton =

American softball coach

Current position
- Title: Head coach
- Team: Iowa State
- Conference: Big 12
- Record: 241–228 (.514)

Biographical details
- Born: May 25, 1964 (age 62); Fort Smith, Arkansas, U.S.
- Education: Tulsa

Coaching career (HC unless noted)
- 1994–1997: Tulsa (asst.)
- 1998: Louisiana-Monroe (asst.)
- 1999–2000: Virginia (asst.)
- 2001–2004: Tulsa
- 2005–2009: Arkansas
- 2010–2013: Iowa State (asst.)
- 2014–2017: Montana
- 2018–Present: Iowa State

Head coaching record
- Overall: 591–597 (.497)
- Tournaments: NCAA: 3–8 (.273)

Accomplishments and honors

Championships
- Big Sky Tournament Champions (2017)

Awards
- 2× WAC Coach of the Year (2002, 2004); 2× Big Sky Coach of the Year (2016, 2017)

Jamie Pinkerton (born May 25, 1964) is an American softball coach who is the current head coach at Iowa State.

== Coaching career ==
=== Iowa State ===
On August 2, 2017, Jamie Pinkerton was announced as the new head coach of the Iowa State softball program, replacing Jamie Trachsel who left for Minnesota.

On July 30, 2021 Iowa State and softball coach Jamie Pinkerton agreed to a contract extension through June 30, 2025.

Pinkerton completed his fourth season at the helm of the Cyclones in 2021, leading Iowa State to the NCAA Tournament for the first time since 1988. After a 34–23 season in 2021, Pinkerton has a record of 105–94 at Iowa State, including a COVID-19 shortened season in 2020. The Cyclones won a pair of games at the 2021 NCAA Regional, advancing to the regional championship for the first time in program history.

Iowa State also earned its first-ever ranking in the NFCA Top-25 Coaches poll on Feb. 23, 2021, debuting at No. 25 in the country. ISU's unprecedented success has been sparked by Pinkerton engineering the greatest offense ever seen in Ames. For the third time in his four seasons at Iowa State, the Cyclones set a new school record for home runs – hitting 64 in just 57 games.

== Head coaching record ==
=== College ===
Record table
Season	Team	Overall	Conference	Standing	Postseason
Tulsa Golden Hurricane (Western Athletic Conference) (2001–2004)
2001	Tulsa	13–42	3–13	6th	
2002	Tulsa	48–16	15–9	2nd	
2003	Tulsa	34–29	8–12	4th	
2004	Tulsa	45–18	16–5	2nd	
Tulsa:		140–105 (.571)	42–39 (.519)		
Arkansas Razorbacks (Southeastern Conference) (2005–2009)
2005	Arkansas	19–43	4–25	6th (West)	
2006	Arkansas	26–35	10–19	4th (West)	
2007	Arkansas	21–43	6–22	6th (West)	
2008	Arkansas	37–29	8–20	6th (West)	NCAA Regional
2009	Arkansas	27–29	10–16	3rd (West)	NCAA Regional
Arkansas:		130–179 (.421)	38–102 (.271)		
Montana Griz (Big Sky Conference) (2015–2017)
2015	Montana	16–34	8–13	6th	
2016	Montana	29–27	14–7	3rd	
2017	Montana	35–24	15–6	2nd	NCAA Regional
Montana:		80–85 (.485)	37–26 (.587)		
Iowa State Cyclones (Big 12 Conference) (2018–Present)
2018	Iowa State	23–33	4–14	6th	
2019	Iowa State	37–25	7–11	5th	NISC Championship Runners-up
2020	Iowa State	11–13	0–0		Season canceled due to COVID-19
2021	Iowa State	34–23	6–12	5th	NCAA Regional
2022	Iowa State	28–27	6–12	4th	
2023	Iowa State	25–30	6–12	5th	
2024	Iowa State	20–31	6–18	9th	
2025	Iowa State	31–23	15–9	3rd	
2026	Iowa State	32–23	9–15	9th	
Iowa State:		241–228 (.514)	59–103 (.364)		
Total:		591–597 (.497)			
National champion Postseason invitational champion Conference regular season champion Conference regular season and conference tournament champion Division regular season champion Division regular season and conference tournament champion Conference tournament champion
