= Dot Richardson =

American softball player and coach

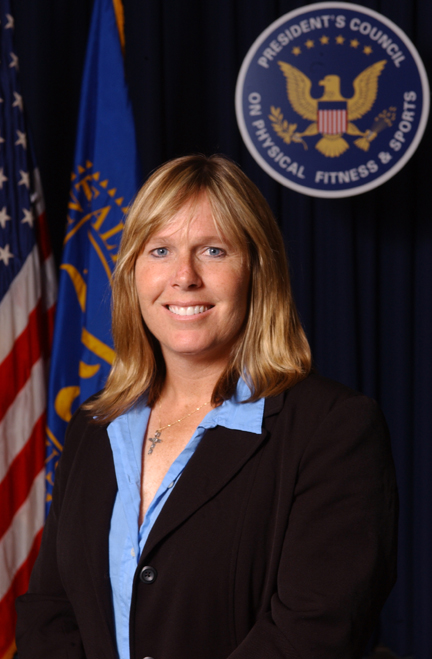

Current position
- Title: Head coach
- Team: Liberty
- Conference: Conference USA
- Record: 434–269 (.617)

Biographical details
- Born: September 22, 1961 (age 65); Orlando, Florida, U.S.
- Education: UCLA; Adelphi University; University of Louisville; USC

Playing career
- 1980: Western Illinois
- 1981–1983: UCLA
- Position: Shortstop

Coaching career (HC unless noted)
- 2014–present: Liberty

Head coaching record
- Overall: 434–269 (.617)
Medal record
Women's softball
Representing the United States
Olympic Games
Gold medal – first place	1996 Atlanta	Team competition
Gold medal – first place	2000 Sydney	Team competition

Dorothy Gay Richardson (born September 22, 1961) is an American physician and former two-time gold medal-winning Olympian softball player at shortstop. Richardson is currently the head coach at Liberty. Richardson played college softball at UCLA and won the inaugural NCAA Division I softball tournament in 1982. She is a USA Softball Hall of Fame honoree.

== Education ==
Richardson attended Western Illinois University for one year and the University of California Los Angeles for four years. Richardson has a master's degree in exercise physiology and health from Adelphi University in Garden City, New York. She attended the University of Louisville School of Medicine and received an M.D. degree in 1993. She then entered her five-year orthopedic residency program at the University of Southern California. She took a one-year leave of absence to participate in the 1996 Olympic Games, where she and her teammates captured the first ever Olympic gold medal in softball. Between 1999 and 2000, she did a fellowship in sports medicine at the Kerlan-Jobe Orthopedic Sports Medicine Clinic in Los Angeles. She is the aunt of entrepreneur and inventor, Lisa Seacat DeLuca.

== Softball career ==
Dot began her softball career in 1972 playing for the Union Park Jets in Orlando. In early 1975, at the age of 13, Dot was a member of the Orlando Rebels in the ASA (Amateur Softball Association of America), She became the youngest player ever to play in the ASA Women's Major Fast-Pitch National Championships. After graduating from Colonial High School in Orlando, Richardson played for Western Illinois, before transferring to UCLA, where she played for the UCLA Bruins from 1980 to 1984. While there she helped the Bruins win their first NCAA championship in 1982.

After college Dot played professionally, starting her career in Orlando with the Florida Rebels. She then joined the Raybestos Brakettes of Stratford, Connecticut in 1984, where she remained until 1994. She ended her professional career with the California Commotion of Woodland Hills, California.

Richardson was a key part of the United States national team that won the gold medal during the sport's Olympic debut in 1996 hitting the home run that won the game. She was also part of the 2000 gold medal-winning team in Sydney. After her win at the Olympics, she continued with her career as an orthopedic surgeon. Dot Richardson was Executive Director and Medical Director of the National Training Center until 2012. She is the head softball coach at Liberty University, in Lynchburg, Virginia. Richardson now serves as a board chair for the Fellowship of Christian Athletes Softball Ministry, where her husband Bob Pinto is the national director.

== Coaching career ==
Richardson was named as the head softball coach at Liberty University on July 17, 2013. The Flames have shown improvement in each of Richardson's first five seasons. After an 11–46 record her first season in 2014, Liberty won 29 games in 2015. Richardson then posted her first winning record in 2016 and followed that year with two straight regular season Big South titles in 2017 and 2018 with 45+ wins in both seasons, winning the Big South conference tournament in 2018 and receiving a regional automatic qualifying spot to play at South Carolina. Richardson also coached the Flames to the NISC postseason tournament title in 2017.

== Awards ==
Richardson is the recipient of the 1998 Sports Legends Award, the 1997 Babe Zaharias Award (Female Athlete of the Year), the 1996 Amateur Athletic Foundation Athlete of the Year, inducted into the UCLA Hall of Fame in 1996, Nuprin Comeback of the Year Award in 1990, four-time Sullivan Award nominee and inducted into the Florida State Hall of Fame in 1999. Her college honors include NCAA Player of the Decade (1980s), three-time NCAA All-American, two-time AIAW All-American, three-time UCLA MVP and 1983 All University Award at UCLA. She was named MVP in the Women's Major Fast Pitch National Championship four times. She is an inductee of the National Softball Hall of Fame.

== Statistics ==
=== UCLA Bruins ===
YEAR	G	AB	R	H	BA	RBI	HR	3B	2B	TB	SLG	BB	SO	SB	SBA
1982	40	137	17	45	.328	8	0	4	8	61	.445%	22	4	4	4
1983	47	156	25	52	.333	17	0	4	8	68	.436%	19	6	8	8
TOTALS	87	293	42	97	.331	25	0	8	16	129	.440%	41	10	12	12

=== Team USA ===
YEAR	G	AB	R	H	BA	RBI	HR	3B	2B	TB	SLG	BB	SO
1996 OLYMPICS	9	33	4	9	.272	9	3	0	2	20	.606%	2	6

== Head coaching record ==
Record table
Season	Team	Overall	Conference	Standing	Postseason
Liberty Lady Flames (Big South Conference) (2014–2018)
2014	Liberty	11–46	4–20	9th	
2015	Liberty	29–30	12–12	4th	
2016	Liberty	31–28	16–8	3rd	
2017	Liberty	46–24	16–5	1st	NISC Champions
2018	Liberty	47–12	18–3	1st	NCAA Regional
Liberty Lady Flames (ASUN Conference) (2019–2023)
2019	Liberty	40–22	16–5	3rd	NISC (3rd)
2020	Liberty	10–13			Season canceled due to COVID-19 pandemic
2021	Liberty	44–15	16–2	1st	NCAA Regional
2022	Liberty	44–18	23–1	1st	NCAA Regional
2023	Liberty	44–22	19–5	2nd	NCAA Regional
Liberty Lady Flames (Conference USA) (2024–present)
2024	Liberty	38–25	19–5	1st	NCAA Regional
2025	Liberty	50–14	23–3	1st	NCAA Super Regional
2026	Liberty	29–28	18–9	3rd	
Liberty:		463–297 (.609)	200–78 (.719)		
Total:		463–297 (.609)			
National champion Postseason invitational champion Conference regular season champion Conference regular season and conference tournament champion Division regular season champion Division regular season and conference tournament champion Conference tournament champion

Preceded by Lisa Leslie	Flo Hyman Memorial Award; 2002	Succeeded by Nawal El Moutawakel
