= Indianapolis Executive Airport =

Airport in Boone County, Indiana, US

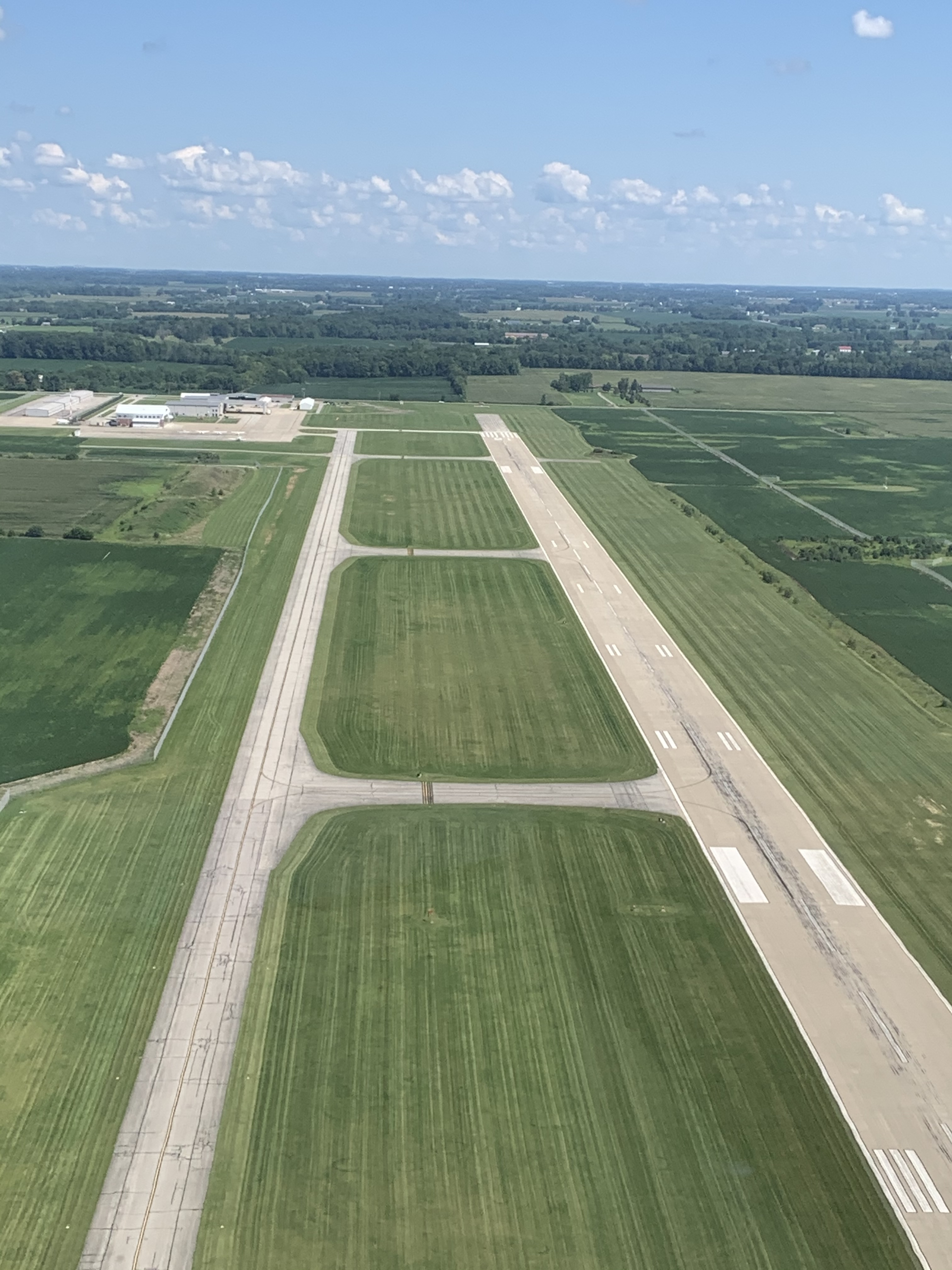
- TYQ Aerial 2020
- IATA: none; ICAO: KTYQ; FAA LID: TYQ

Summary
- Airport type: Public
- Owner: Hamilton County Airport Authority
- Serves: Indianapolis, Indiana
- Location: Zionsville, Indiana
- Elevation AMSL: 922 ft (281 m)
- Coordinates: 40°01′50″N 086°15′05″W

Map
- Location of airport in Indiana TYQ (the United States)

Runways
Direction	Length		Surface
Direction	ft	m	Surface
18/36	7,000	2,134	Concrete

Statistics
- Aircraft operations (2019): 41,810
- Based aircraft (2023): 99
- Source: FAA and airport web site

Indianapolis Executive Airport (ICAO: KTYQ, FAA LID: TYQ) is a public airport at 11329 E. State Road 32, five miles north of Zionsville, in Boone County, Indiana, United States. The airport is owned by the Hamilton County Airport Authority. It is 14 miles (23 km) northwest of downtown Indianapolis and is a reliever airport for Indianapolis International Airport. In 2020, the airport was categorized as a "National" airport in the National Plan of Integrated Airport Systems.

Most U.S. airports use the same three-letter location identifier for the FAA and for IATA, but Indianapolis Executive Airport is TYQ to the FAA and has no IATA code. It was formerly Terry Airport (FAA LID: I52).

== History ==
Campbell Aviation began developing Indianapolis Executive Airport (TYQ) as Terry Airport in 1957 with a 3,340-by-60-foot (1,018 by 18 m) bituminous runway configured in a north–south direction and a 3,000-by-200-foot (914 by 61 m) turf runway configured in a northeast–southwest direction. It was certified by the State of Indiana in 1958. The airport included 10 T-hangars and an administration building. A few years later, 26 more T-hangars were added.

In 1965, the Campbells sold the airport to the Van Sickles. In 1978, the north–south runway (Runway 18–36) was lengthened to 5,160 feet (1,570 m), widened to 75 feet (23 m), and three aircraft turnarounds were constructed. Other improvements included installing High Intensity Runway Lights (HIRL), Visual Approach Slope Indicators (VASI-2) for both runways, and an Instrument Landing System, including a Non-Directional Beacon (NDB). Three large hangars were also added.

The airport was classified as a reliever to Indianapolis International Airport in the 1980s, which opened the door for the facility to get government funding from the FAA and the state of Indiana. In 1986, TYQ received its first federal grant for construction to install underdrains for Runway 18-36 and acquire 40 acres (16 ha) of land for approach protection. In 1987 and 1988, other grants were received to reconstruct, widen, and groove the primary runway, which resulted in a 60,000-pound (27,000 kg) DWL (dual wheel loading) strength for the runway. Under this grant, 33 acres (13 ha) of land were acquired, an aircraft apron was constructed, and a partial parallel taxiway was added. In the early 1990s, TYQ received three more grants for extending the runway to its current length of 5,500 feet (1,700 m) and acquiring an additional 322 acres (130 ha) of land. The airport did not receive further grants until 2001 when it mitigated wetland impacts and graded the runway safety area. In 2003, the airport was purchased by Hamilton County and the Hamilton County Airport Authority began receiving a series of grants for reimbursement for that purchase.

== Facilities and aircraft ==
Indianapolis Executive Airport covers 567 acres (229 ha); it has one runway, 18/36, which is 7,000 by 100 feet (2,134 by 30 m) concrete. For the 12-month period ending December 31, 2019, the airport had 41,810 aircraft operations, an average of 115 per day: 95% general aviation and 5% air taxi. In November 2023, there were 99 aircraft based at this airport: 68 single-engine, 7 multi-engine, 20 jet and 4 helicopter.

Jet Access Zionsville is the airport's full service fixed-base operator. Taft Aviation manages the airport's T-hangars. The airport is also host to Beck's Hybrids corporate aviation department. The Civil Air Patrol maintains a squadron at the airport.

== Eagle Composite Squadron ==
Indianapolis Executive Airport formerly hosted a squadron for the Civil Air Patrol. Eagle Composite Squadron conducted its weekly meeting at TYQ until April 2024 but now meets at the recently completed Republic Airlines training facility in Carmel, Indiana. Members of the squadron meet starting at 18:00 and ending at 20:30 every Tuesday. The meetings are categorized topically: Leadership, Aerospace Education, Emergency Services, and Physical Training. Eagle has been awarded numerous wing level awards, including Squadron of Merit (SOM) for the years 2022 and 2021. Eagle has an active cadet-led program. Cadets conduct meetings, host weekend and volunteer events, and teach other cadets during their weekly meetings. Eagle Composite Squadron has over 80 registered CAP members.

== See also ==
- List of airports in Indiana
