= UT Arlington Mavericks softball =

Texas–Arlington Mavericks
- 2025 UT Arlington Mavericks softball team
- Founded: 1973 (52 years ago)
- University: University of Texas at Arlington
- Head coach: Kara Dill
- Conference: UAC
- Location: Arlington, Texas, US
- Home stadium: Allan Saxe Field (capacity: 622)
- Nickname: Mavericks
- Colors: Royal blue, white, and orange

NCAA Tournament appearances
- 2003

Conference tournament championships
- Southland: 2003

Regular-season conference championships
- Southland: 1983, 1986, 1989, 2003, 2007

The UT Arlington Mavericks softball team is a varsity intercollegiate athletic team of the University of Texas at Arlington in Arlington, Texas, United States. The team rejoined the United Athletic Conference in 2023, which is part of the National Collegiate Athletic Association's Division I. The team plays its home games at Allan Saxe Field in Arlington, Texas.

== History ==
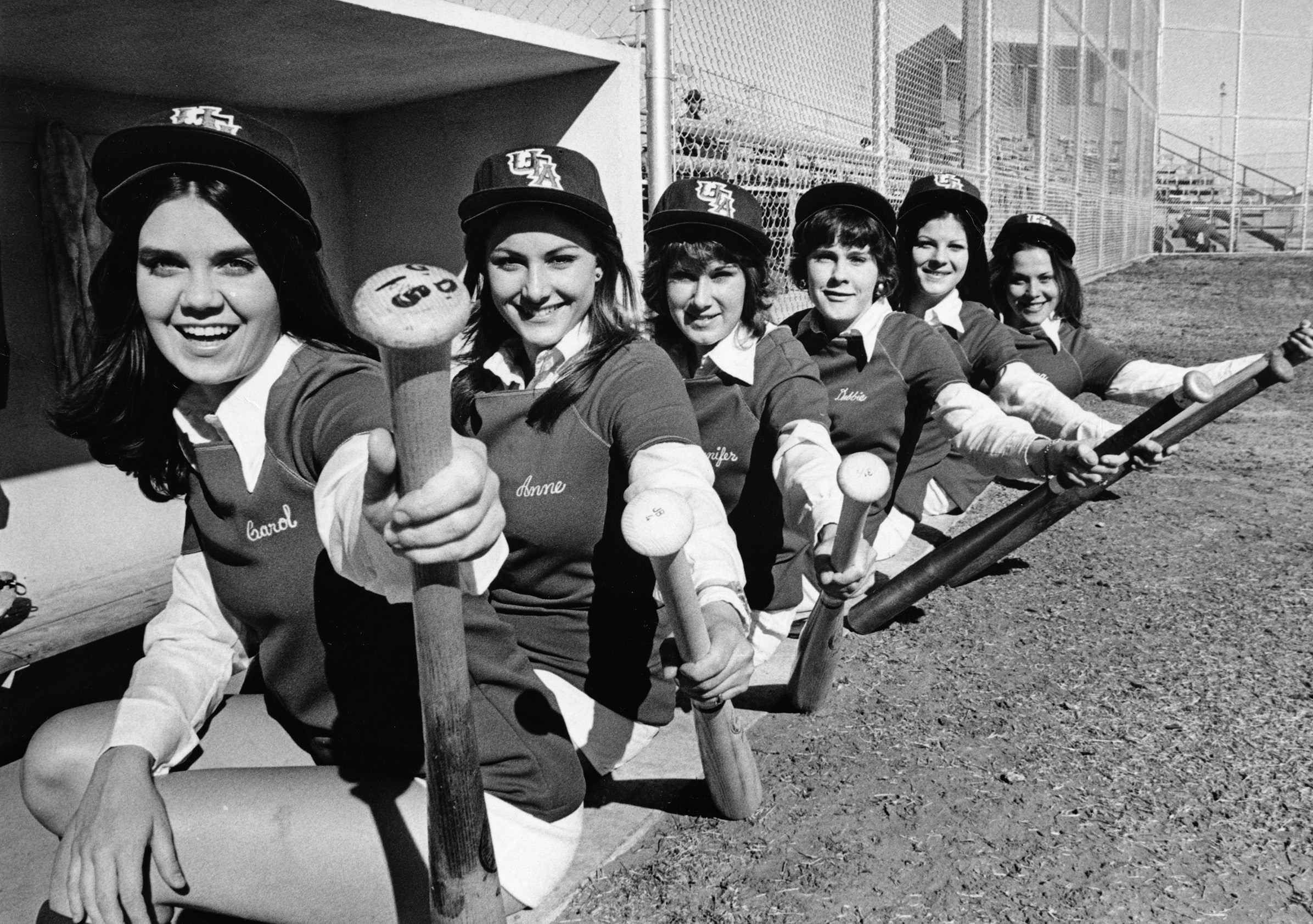
UTA softball team, circa 1980

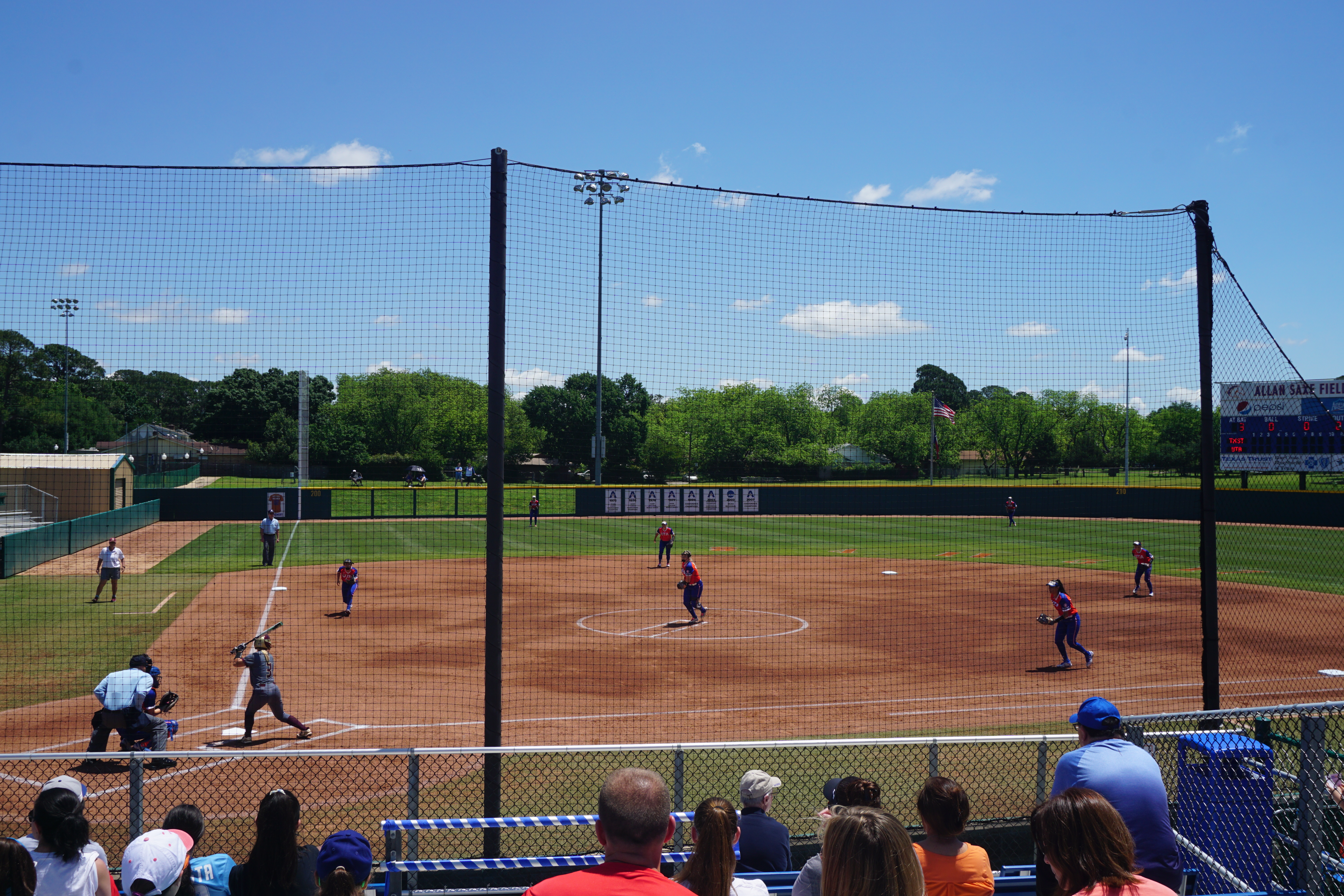
UTA in action against Texas State in 2019

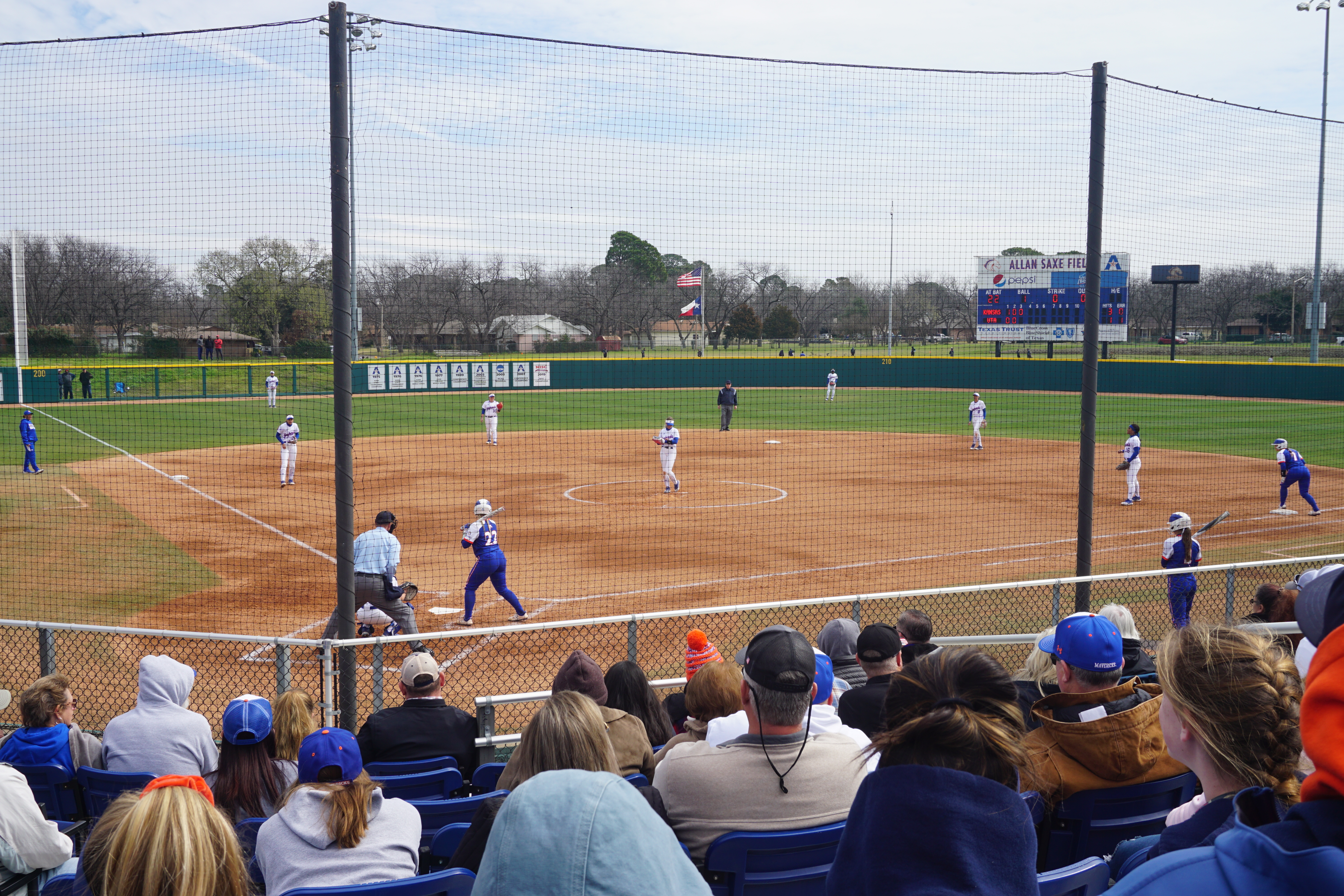
UTA in action against Kansas in 2020

UTA began playing intercollegiate softball in time for the fall 1973 season, under Coach Jody Conradt, who was also the volleyball and basketball coach. In their first season as members of the AIAW, UTA went 11–6 and finished 5th in the AIAW State Tournament. The Mavericks would play in the AIAW until joining the NCAA for the 1981–82 athletic season. During that time, UTA won two AIAW State titles and advanced to the AIAW Women's College World Series each time (1976 and 1977). The highest finish was an eighth-place finish in the Spring of 1976, when they went 2–2.

Shortly after UTA joined the NCAA, they began play in the Southland Conference and won regular season conference championships in 1983, 1986, 1989, 2003 and 2007, while finishing as runners-up in 1985, 1987, 1988, 1990, 1993, 2008 and 2011. UTA has not had the same success in the conference tournament, where they have compiled a record of 27–39. Their only tournament championship came in 2003, while they have finished as the tournament runners-up in 1983, 1987 and 2006.

The watershed moment for the Mavericks program came in the 2003 NCAA Tournament. UTA was the 7th seed in the 8-team Gainesville Regional. UTA went 2–2, with a 1–0 win over Florida State, followed by a 2–0 win over host Florida. UTA's first loss occurred to eventual Regional champion Oklahoma, 6–2. In the following game, they were eliminated by Oregon State 2–0.

For the 2013 season, UTA played in the Western Athletic Conference. In the 2014 season, UTA began participation as members of the Sun Belt Conference, a stint that last nine years until UTA went to their new conference home.

== Season-by-season results ==
Record table
Season	Coach	Overall	Conference	Standing	Postseason
Jody Conradt (Independent) (1973–1976)
Fall 1973	Conradt	11–6			5th AIAW State Tournament
Fall 1974	Conradt	15–4			AIAW State Tournament
Fall 1975	Conradt	19–8			1st AIAW State Tournament
Spring 1976	Conradt	8–4			8th AIAW College World Series
Jody Conradt:		53–22 (.707)			
Butch McBroom (Independent) (1976–1977)
Fall 1976	McBroom	25–3			1st AIAW State Tournament
Spring 1977	McBroom	8–5			AIAW College World Series
Butch McBroom:		33–8 (.805)			
Karen Owen (Independent) (1977–1979)
Fall 1977	Owen	23–6			AIAW State Tournament
Spring 1978	Owen	24–16			5th AIAW Regional Tournament
Fall 1978	Owen	8–22			AIAW State Tournament
Spring 1979	Owen	17–14–1			AIAW Regional Tournament
Karen Owen:		72–58–1 (.553)			
Randy Porter (Independent) (1979–1983)
Fall 1979	Porter	17–14			4th AIAW State Tournament
Spring 1980	Porter	34–15			7th AIAW Regional Tournament
Fall 1980	Porter	27–10			3rd AIAW State Tournament
Spring 1981	Porter	29–14			2nd AIAW Regional Tournament
Fall 1981	Porter	27–15			3rd AIAW State Tournament
Spring 1982	Porter	29–21			4th AIAW Regional Tournament
Fall 1982	Porter	16–8			
Randy Porter:		179–97 (.649)			
Randy Porter (Southland) (1983–1984)
Spring 1983	Porter	39–19	5–1	1st	
Fall 1983	Porter	6–12			
Spring 1984	Porter	26–25–2	3–1	T-1st	
Randy Porter:		71–56–2 (.558)	8–2 (.800)		
Rayla Allison (Southland) (1984–1989)
Fall 1984	Allison	9–4			
Spring 1985	Allison	27–22	8–4	2nd	
Fall 1985	Allison	5–9			
Spring 1986	Allison	25–25	10–2	T-1st	
Fall 1986	Allison	9–5			
Spring 1987	Allison	36–27	9–3	2nd	
Fall 1987	Allison	9–12–2			
Spring 1988	Allison	34–27	10–3	2nd	
Fall 1988	Allison	4–3			
Spring 1989	Allison	34–19	10–2	1st	
Rayla Allison:		192–153–2 (.556)	47–14 (.770)		
Anne Campbell (Southland) (1989–1996)
Fall 1989	Campbell	3–5			
1990	Campbell	27–24	7–3	2nd	
1991	Campbell	21–38	9–15	5th	
1992	Campbell	32–30	16–12	5th	
1993	Campbell	36–23	18–6	2nd	
1994	Campbell	17–37	11–19	7th	
1995	Campbell	22–34	9–23	7th	
1996	Campbell	28–30	10–14	6th	
Anne Campbell:		186–221 (.457)	80–92 (.465)		
Debbie Hedrick (Southland) (1997–2012)
1997	Hedrick	18–30	10–11	4th	
1998	Hedrick	16–29	11–15	5th	
1999	Hedrick	31–25	17–10	3rd	
2000	Hedrick	22–33	13–14	6th	
2001	Hedrick	25–22–1	15–10	3rd	
2002	Hedrick	16–30–1	9–17	7th	
2003	Hedrick	41–17	23–4	1st	NCAA Regional
2004	Hedrick	24–24–1	15–10	4th	
2005	Hedrick	17–26–1	13–13	5th	
2006	Hedrick	32–22	16–9	3rd	
2007	Hedrick	36–16	19–5	1st	
2008	Hedrick	27–22	20–10	T-2nd	
2009	Hedrick	23–24	17–13	5th	
2010	Hedrick	29–25	16–12	3rd	
2011	Hedrick	33–25	20–10	T-2nd	
2012	Hedrick	15–27	5–15	T-10th	
Debbie Hedrick:		405–397–4 (.505)	239–178 (.573)		
Kristie Fox (Western Athletic Conference) (2013–2013)
2013	Fox	25–28	8–13	T-6th	
Kristie Fox (Sun Belt Conference) (2014–2017)
2014	Fox	21–33	4–16	8th	
2015	Fox	27–28	8–14	7th	
2016	Fox	29–20	8–16	7th	
2017	Fox	32–28	14–13	5th	NISC Regional
Kristie Fox:		134–137 (.494)	34–56 (.378)		
Peejay Brun (Sun Belt Conference) (2018–present)
2018	Brun	30–28	14–12	3rd	NISC Runner-Up
2019	Brun	36–27	17–10	3rd	NISC Champions
2020	Brun	12–13	2–1	4th	
2021	Brun	17–34	9–14	7th	
2022	Brun	22–27	12–15	5th	
Peejay Brun:		117–129(.476)	54–52 (.509)		
Kara Dill (Western Athletic Conference) (2023–present)
2023	Dill	22–30	11–13	7th	
Kara Dill:		22–30(.423)	11–13 (.458)		
Total:		1,464–1,308–9 (.528)			
National champion Postseason invitational champion Conference regular season champion Conference regular season and conference tournament champion Division regular season champion Division regular season and conference tournament champion Conference tournament champion

== See also ==
- List of NCAA Division I softball programs
