= Radford Highlanders =

- University: Radford University
- Conference: Big South Conference
- NCAA: Division I
- Athletic director: Robert Lineburg
- Location: Radford, Virginia
- Varsity teams: 15
- Basketball arena: Dedmon Center
- Baseball stadium: Carter Memorial Stadium
- Softball stadium: Radford Softball Stadium
- Soccer stadium: Patrick D. Cupp Stadium
- Volleyball arena: Dedmon Center
- Nickname: Highlanders
- Colors: Red, gray, and white
- Website: radfordathletics.com
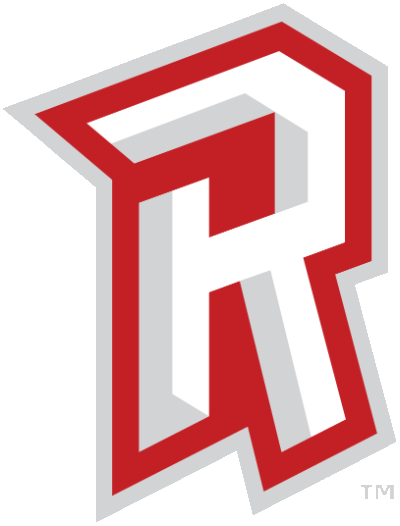

The Radford Highlanders are composed of 15 teams representing Radford University in intercollegiate athletics, including men and women's basketball, cross country, golf, soccer, and tennis. Men's sports include baseball. Women's sports include volleyball, lacrosse, track and field, and softball. The Highlanders compete in the NCAA Division I and are members of the Big South Conference.

== Sponsored sports ==
Men's sports	Women's sports
Baseball	Basketball
Basketball	Cross Country
Cross Country	Golf
Golf	Soccer
Soccer	Softball
Track and Field	Track and Field
	Volleyball

== Radford in the NCAA Tournament ==
=== Men's Basketball ===
Year	Seed	Round	Opponent	Result
1998	#16	First Round	#1 Duke	L 63–99
2009	#16	First Round	#1 North Carolina	L 58–101
2018	#16	First Four; First Round	#16 LIU Brooklyn #1 Villanova	W 71–61; L 61–87

=== Women's Basketball ===
Radford is a member of the Big South Conference

Year	Seed	Round	Opponent	Result
1994	#16	First Round	#1 Purdue	L 56−103
1995	#11	First Round	#6 Florida	L 49−89
1996	#16	First Round	#1 Tennessee	L 56−97
2019	#14	First Round	#3 Maryland	L 51−73

=== Baseball ===
Year	Record	Pct	Regional
2015	2–2	.500	Nashville Regional
Totals	2-2	.500	

=== Softball ===
Year	Record	Pct	Regional
2009	1–2	.333	Chapel Hill Regional
2010	2–2	.500	Athens Regional
Totals	3–4	.429	

=== Men's Soccer ===
Year	Round	Opponent	Result
1999	Play-in	Furman	L 0-1
2000	Play-in	Furman	L 0-2
2015	First Round	Charlotte	L 1-2
2016	First Round	Coastal Carolina	L 1-2

=== Women's Soccer ===
Year	Round	Opponent	Result
1985	First Round	NC State	L 0-1
1998	First Round	James Madison	L 0-4
2002	First Round	#2 North Carolina	L 1-6
2008	First Round	#3 Duke	L 1-5
2011	First Round	#1 Duke	L 0-5
2012	First Round	#2 North Carolina	L 0-2
2018	First Round	#2 West Virginia	L 0-6
2019	First Round	#1 Virginia	L 0-3

== Notable alumni ==
- Spencer Horwitz (born 1997), Major League Baseball first baseman for the Toronto Blue Jays
