= Longwood Lancers softball =

Longwood Lancers
- University: Longwood University
- Head coach: Dr. Megan Brown (4th season)
- Conference: Big South
- Location: Farmville, VA
- Home stadium: Lancer Field (Capacity: 300)
- Nickname: Lancers
- Colors: Blue and white

NCAA Tournament appearances
- Division I: 2013, 2015, 2016, 2017, 2019; Division II: 2002, 2003

Conference tournament championships
- Big South: 2013, 2015, 2016, 2017, 2019; CVAC: 2002, 2003

Regular-season conference championships
- Big South: 2015, 2016, 2019, 2022, 2023; CVAC: 2003

The Longwood Lancers softball team is the college softball team which represents Longwood University in Farmville, Virginia. The school's team currently competes in the Big South Conference, having done so since the 2013 season. They have been led since 2020 by Megan Brown.

== History ==
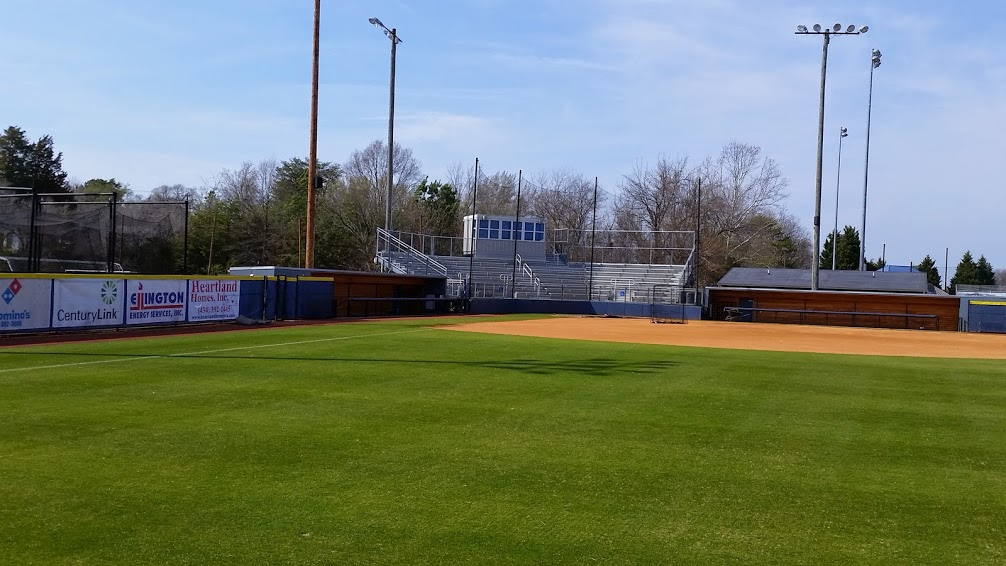
Lancer Field

The softball team was first fielded in 1981. They were members of Division II through the 2004 season, when they (along with other Longwood Lancers teams) began a transition to Division I. They previously competed in the Division II Carolinas–Virginia Athletic Conference from 1996 through 2003; in their final two seasons in CVAC, they won the tournament championship, as well as the 2003 regular season championship, and competed in the NCAA Division II Softball Championship each year.

In their first season of membership in the Big South Conference, Longwood won the tournament championship. Two years later, they repeated the feat, in addition winning their first Big South regular season championship, and their first NCAA Division I Softball Championship victory, beating Virginia Tech. The following year, they again repeated as regular season and tournament champions; in the 2016 NCAA Tournament, the Lancers advanced to the regional finals, where they fell to James Madison.

== Postseason ==
Longwood competing against North Carolina in the 2016 NCAA tournament.

=== NCAA Division I tournament results ===
The Lancers have appeared in the NCAA Division I softball tournament four times. Their record is 5–10.

Year	Round	Opponent	Result
2013	Regional First Round; Regional Consolation	Tennessee; James Madison	L 0–9; L 0–5
2015	Regional First Round; Regional Consolation; Regional Second Round	Tennessee; Virginia Tech; Utah	L 0–2; W 6–4 ^{(8)} L 0–2
2016	Regional First Round; Regional Consolation; Regional Second Round; Regional Finals	North Carolina; Princeton; North Carolina; James Madison	L 4–6; W 2–1; W 5–4 ^{(9)} L 1–5
2017	Regional First Round; Regional Consolation; Regional Second Round; Regional Finals	Tennessee; Ohio State; USC Upstate; Tennessee	L 0–5; W 3–1; W 4–2; L 0–3
2019	Regional First Round; Regional Consolation	Tennessee; North Carolina	L 0–8; L 1-3

=== NCAA Division II tournament results ===
The Lancers appeared in the NCAA Division II Softball Championship twice, in 2002 and 2003. Their record is 2–4.

Year	Round	Opponent	Result
2002	Regional First Round; Regional Consolation; Regional Second Round	North Florida; Lenoir–Rhyne; Coker	L 0–8; W 3–1; L 0–4
2003	Regional First Round; Regional Second Round; Regional Consolation	Armstrong Atlantic State; North Florida; Columbus State	W 1–0; L 0–9^{(5)} L 1–4

== Coaches ==
Head coach	Years	Win–loss	Pct.
Nanette Fisher	1981–85	57–43	.570
Loretta Coughlin	1986–95	133–125–2	.515
Glenda Grubbs	1996–97	26–34	.433
Kathy Riley	1998–2020	812–488–1	.625
Megan Brown	2020–present	26-28	.481

== Year-by-year results ==
Statistics overview
Season	Coach	Overall	Conference	Standing	Postseason
Nanette Fisher (Division II independent) (1981–1985)
1981	Nanette Fisher	11–6			
1982	Nanette Fisher	10–8			
1983	Nanette Fisher	9–13			
1984	Nanette Fisher	11–5			
1985	Nanette Fisher	16–11			
Nanette Fisher:		57–43 (.570)			
Loretta Coughlin (Division II independent) (1986–1995)
1986	Loretta Coughlin	8–17			
1987	Loretta Coughlin	10–8–1			
1988	Loretta Coughlin	21–5			
1989	Loretta Coughlin	12–15			
1990	Loretta Coughlin	11–13			
1991	Loretta Coughlin	11–13			
1992	Loretta Coughlin	13–11			
1993	Loretta Coughlin	14–15			
1994	Loretta Coughlin	23–10–1			
1995	Loretta Coughlin	10–18			
Loretta Coughlin:		133–125–2 (.515)			
Glenda Grubbs (CVAC) (1996–1997)
1996	Glenda Grubbs	13–19			
1997	Glenda Grubbs	13–15			
Glenda Grubbs:		26–34 (.433)			
Kathy Riley (CVAC) (1998–2003)
1998	Kathy Riley	22–18			
1999	Kathy Riley	38–15			
2000	Kathy Riley	34–23			
2001	Kathy Riley	26–14–1			
2002	Kathy Riley	37–14		2nd	South Atlantic Regional
2003	Kathy Riley	37–6		1st	South Atlantic Regional
Kathy Riley (Division II independent) (2004)
2004	Kathy Riley	37–13			
Kathy Riley (Division I independent) (2005–2012)
2005	Kathy Riley	32–20			
2006	Kathy Riley	27–19			
2007	Kathy Riley	21–18			
2008	Kathy Riley	27–18			
2009	Kathy Riley	23–23			
2010	Kathy Riley	36–16			
2011	Kathy Riley	37–13			
2012	Kathy Riley	29–26			
Kathy Riley (Big South Conference) (2013–present)
2013	Kathy Riley	41–20	16–8	3rd	0–2 Knoxville Regional
2014	Kathy Riley	40–16	17–6	2nd	
2015	Kathy Riley	34–25	20–4	1st	1–2 Knoxville Regional
2016	Kathy Riley	40–20	19–5	1st	2–2 Harrisonburg Regional
2017	Kathy Riley	30–29	13–8	T–2nd	2–2 Knoxville Regional
2018	Kathy Riley	37–14	17–4	2nd	
2019	Kathy Riley	37–20	20–4	1st	NCAA Tournament
Kathy Riley:		722–400–1 (.643)	122–39 (.758)		
Total:		938–602–3 (.609)			
National champion Postseason invitational champion Conference regular season champion Conference regular season and conference tournament champion Division regular season champion Division regular season and conference tournament champion Conference tournament champion
