= Liberty Lady Flames softball =

- University: Liberty University
- Head coach: Dot Richardson (13th season)
- Conference: ASUN
- Location: Lynchburg, Virginia, US
- Home stadium: Kamphuis Field at Liberty Softball Stadium (capacity: 1,000)
- Nickname: Lady Flames
- Colors: Red, white, and blue

NCAA super regional appearances
- 2025

NCAA Tournament appearances
- 2002, 2011, 2018, 2021, 2022, 2023, 2024, 2025

Conference tournament championships
- Big South: 2011, 2018; ASUN: 2021, 2022; Conference USA: 2024, 2025

The Liberty Lady Flames softball is the team that represents Liberty University in NCAA Division I college softball. The team currently participates in the ASUN Conference. The Lady Flames are led by their head coach Dot Richardson. The team plays its home games at Liberty Softball Field located on the university's campus.

== History ==
During the 2025 NCAA Division I softball tournament, Liberty eliminated Texas A&M in the College Station regional, to advance to their first Super Regional in program history This marked the first time a No. 1 seed in the NCAA tournament failed to advance to the Super Regionals since the NCAA tournament began seeding in 2005.

== Liberty in the NCAA Tournament ==
Year	Record	Pct	Notes
2002	0–2	.000	Regional No. 1
2011	0–2	.000	Knoxville Regional
2018	2–2	.500	Columbia Regional
2021	2–2	.500	Knoxville Regional
2022	1–2	.333	Durham Regional
2023	2–2	.500	Los Angeles Regional
2024	2–2	.500	Athens Regional
2025	3–3	.500	Eugene Super Regional
TOTALS	12–17	.414	

== Year-by-year results ==
Season	Conference	Coach	Overall				Conference				Notes
Season	Conference	Coach	Games	Win	Loss	Tie	Games	Win	Loss	Tie	Notes
1979	n/a	Duke Barnes	18	8	10	0	--	--	--	--	First year
1980	n/a	Barbara Dearing	27	11	16	0	--	--	--	--	
1981	n/a	Barbara Dearing	34	18	16	0	--	--	--	--	
1982	n/a	Barbara Dearing	40	28	12	0	--	--	--	--	
1983	n/a	Barbara Dearing	35	21	14	0	--	--	--	--	
1984	n/a	Barbara Dearing	49	24	25	0	--	--	--	--	
1985	n/a	Barbara Dearing	54	12	42	0	--	--	--	--	
1986	n/a	Mike Goad	43	30	13	0	--	--	--	--	Program Hiatus until 1994
1994	Big South	Paul Wetmore	41	8	33	0	14	1	13	0	Program resumes / Joins Big South Conference (9th Place)
1995	Big South	Paul Wetmore	53	24	29	0	14	1	13	0	8th Place - Big South
1996	Big South	Paul Wetmore	54	36	18	0	16	9	7	0	5th Place - Big South
1997	Big South	Paul Wetmore	60	36	24	0	16	12	4	0	3rd Place - Big South
1998	Big South	Paul Wetmore	56	33	23	0	16	8	8	0	5th Place - Big South
1999	Big South	Paul Wetmore	66	41	25	0	14	11	3	0	Tied 1st Place - Big South; Tournament Runner-Up
2000	Big South	Paul Wetmore	63	34	29	0	10	9	1	0	1st Place - Big South
2001	Big South	Paul Wetmore	64	18	46	0	10	6	4	0	6th Place - Big South
2002	Big South	Paul Wetmore	63	28	35	0	10	4	6	0	5th Place - Big South; 2002 Big South Conference Champions
2003	Big South	Paul Wetmore	51	17	34	0	11	5	6	0	Tied 4th Place - Big South
2004	Big South	Paul Wetmore	63	19	44	0	12	4	8	0	6th Place - Big South
2005	Big South	Paul Wetmore	54	22	32	0	12	5	7	0	
2006	Big South	Paul Wetmore	64	41	23	0	12	7	5	0	
2007	Big South	Paul Wetmore	62	36	26	0	15	11	4	0	
2008	Big South	Paul Wetmore	61	20	40	1	15	5	10	0	
2009	Big South	Paul Wetmore	61	26	35	0	18	10	8	0	
2010	Big South	Paul Wetmore	57	39	18	0	18	13	5	0	
2011	Big South	Paul Wetmore	60	30	30	0	18	11	7	0	2011 Big South Conference Champions; NCAA Regionals
2012	Big South	Paul Wetmore	55	19	36	0	21	9	12	0	
2013	Big South	Paul Wetmore	57	20	37	0	24	8	16	0	Tied 6th Place - Big South
2014	Big South	Dot Richardson	57	11	46	0	24	4	20	0	9th Place - Big South
2015	Big South	Dot Richardson	59	29	30	0	24	12	12	0	4th Place - Big South
2016	Big South	Dot Richardson	59	31	28	0	24	16	8	0	3rd Place - Big South
2017	Big South	Dot Richardson	70	46	24	0	21	16	5	0	1st Place - Big South; Conference Tournament Runner up 2017 NISC Tournament Champions
2018	Big South	Dot Richardson	63	49	14	0	21	18	3	0	NCAA Regionals
2019	Big South	Dot Richardson	62	40	22	0	21	16	5	0	
2020	Big South	Dot Richardson	23	10	0	0	0	0	0	0	
2021	ASUN	Dot Richardson	59	44	15	0	18	16	2	0	2021 ASUN Tournament Champions; NCAA Regionals

== See also ==
- List of NCAA Division I softball programs
