= 2020 Georgia State Panthers softball team =

American college softball season

2020 Georgia State Panthers softball
- Conference: Sun Belt Conference
- Record: 7–16 (1–2 SBC)
- Head coach: Roger Kincaid (10th season)
- Assistant coaches: Todd Downes; Erin Dixson
- Home stadium: Robert E. Heck Softball Complex

2020 Sun Belt Conference softball standings
	Conf.				Overall
Team	W		L	PCT	W		L	PCT
No. 8 Louisiana ‍‍‍	2	–	1	.667	18	–	6	.750
Texas State ‍‍‍	2	–	1	.667	15	–	9	.625
Georgia Southern ‍‍‍	2	–	1	.667	14	–	10	.583
UT Arlington ‍‍‍	2	–	1	.667	12	–	13	.480
South Alabama ‍‍‍	2	–	1	.667	8	–	17	.320
Troy ‍‍‍	1	–	2	.333	16	–	6	.727
Coastal Carolina ‍‍‍	1	–	2	.333	13	–	8	.619
Appalachian State ‍‍‍	1	–	2	.333	13	–	9	.591
Louisiana–Monroe ‍‍‍	1	–	2	.333	10	–	14	.417
Georgia State ‍‍‍	1	–	2	.333	7	–	16	.304
† – Conference champion ‡ – Tournament champion y – Invited to the NCAA tournament As of March 13, 2020; Rankings from NFCA

The 2020 Georgia State Panthers softball team represented Georgia State Panthers in the 2020 NCAA Division I softball season. The Panthers played their home games at Robert E. Heck Softball Complex. The Panthers were led by tenth year head coach Roger Kincaid and were members of the Sun Belt Conference.

On March 12, the Sun Belt Conference announced the indefinite suspension of all spring athletics, including softball, due to the increasing risk of the COVID-19 pandemic. On March 16, the Sun Belt formally announced the cancelation of all spring sports, thus ending their season definitely.

== Preseason ==
=== Sun Belt Conference Coaches Poll ===
The Sun Belt Conference Coaches Poll was released on January 29, 2020. Georgia State was picked to finish dead-last at tenth in the Sun Belt Conference with 18 votes.

Coaches poll
Predicted finish	Team	Votes (1st place)
1	Louisiana	100 (10)
2	Troy	85
3	UT Arlington	77
4	Texas State	74
5	Coastal Carolina	56
6	Appalachian State	47
7	Georgia Southern	36
8	South Alabama	31
9	Louisiana-Monroe	26
10	Georgia State	18

=== Preseason All-Sun Belt team ===
- Summer Ellyson (LA, SR, Pitcher)
- Megan Kleist (LA, SR, Pitcher)
- Julie Rawls (LA, SR, Catcher)
- Reagan Wright (UTA, SR, Catcher)
- Katie Webb (TROY, SR, 1st Base)
- Kaitlyn Alderink (LA, SR, 2nd Base)
- Hailey Mackay (TXST, SR, 3rd Base)
- Alissa Dalton (LA, SR, Shortstop)
- Jayden Mount (ULM, SR, Shortstop)
- Whitney Walton (UTA, SR, Shortstop)
- Tara Oltmann (TXST, JR, Shortstop)
- Courtney Dean (CCU, JR, Outfield)
- Mekhia Freeman (GASO, SR, Outfield)
- Sarah Hudek (LA, SR, Outfield)
- Raina O'Neal (LA, JR, Outfield)
- Bailey Curry (LA, JR, Designated Player/1st Base)

=== National Softball Signing Day ===
Player	Position	Hometown	Previous Team
Carolyn Deady	Catcher	Marietta, Georgia	Pope HS
Caroline Brownlee	Outfielder	Hoschton, Georgia	Jefferson HS
Aniston Wright	Pitcher	Senoia, Georgia	East Coweta HS
Macy Banks	Pitcher	Homer, Georgia	East Hall HS
Aslinn Spradlin	Infielder	Villa Rica, Georgia	Alexander HS
Elle Doolittle	Pitcher	Macon, Georgia	Howard HS
Alyssa Giles	Outfielder	Brunswick, Georgia	Brunswick HS

== Roster ==
2020 Georgia State Panthers roster
Pitchers: 10 Sophie Mooney - Freshman; 13 Emily Buck - Freshman; 18 Mallory Parson - Senior; 24 Emily Soles - Redshirt Junior; 33 Julia Allen - Freshman; 55 Savannah Freeman - Redshirt Sophomore; 99 Holly Phillips - Sophomore; Outfielders: 1 Sydney Stavro - Senior; 4 Gabby Benson - Sophomore; 19 Emily Brown - Freshman	Catchers: 7 Sofia Tunon - Freshman; 8 Alyssa Brumelow - Junior; 21 Kalynn Hicks - Sophomore; Infielders: 2 Baylee Sexton - Senior; 6 Bailee Richardson - Freshman; 9 Olivia Davis - Sophomore; 12 Caitlin Ray - Redshirt Junior; 17 Paige Taylor - Sophomore; 22 Daisy Hess - Freshman; 25 Skylar Mosel - Junior; 44 Gracie Kittrell - Freshman

=== Coaching staff ===
2020 Georgia State Panthers coaching staff
- Roger Kincaid – Head Coach – 10th year
- Todd Downes – Assistant Head Coach – 9th year
- Erin Dixson – Pitching Coach – 1st year

== Schedule and results ==
Legend
	Georgia State win
	Georgia State loss
	Postponement/Cancellation/Suspensions
**Bold**	Georgia State team member

2020 Georgia State Panthers softball game log
Regular season (7–16)

February (5–13)
Date	Opponent	Rank	Site/stadium	Score	Win	Loss	Save	TV	Attendance	Overall record	SBC record
USF-Rawlings Invitational
Feb. 7	vs. RV Fresno State		USF Softball Stadium • Tampa, FL	**L** 0-5	Lung (1–0)	**Mooney** (0–1)	None			0-1	
Feb. 7	vs. No. 17 Michigan		USF Softball Stadium • Tampa, FL	**L** 1-6	Storako (1–0)	**Buck** (0–1)	None			0-2	
Feb. 8	vs. Illinois State		USF Softball Stadium • Tampa, FL	**W** 10-2 (6 inn)	**Mooney** (1-1)	Leonard (0–2)	None		362	1-2	
Feb. 8	at South Florida		USF Softball Stadium • Tampa, FL	Game Cancelled							
Feb. 9	vs. No. 7 Florida		USF Softball Stadium • Tampa, FL	**L** 0-10 (5 inn)	Trlicek (1-1)	**Buck** (0–2)	None			1-3	
Feb. 11	No. 15 Georgia		Robert E. Heck Softball Complex • Panthersville, GA	**L** 1-10 (6 inn)	Avant (3–0)	**Mooney** (1–2)	None		307	1-4	
The Spring Games
Feb. 14	vs. Presbyterian		R. O. C. Park • Madiera Beach, FL	**L** 0-4	Greene (3–0)	**Mooney** (1–3)	None	FloSoftball	200	1-5	
Feb. 14	vs. South Dakota		R. O. C. Park • Madiera Beach, FL	**L** 1-3	Lisko (2–0)	**Buck** (0–3)	None	FloSoftball	200	1-6	
Feb. 15	vs. Butler		R. O. C. Park • Madiera Beach, FL	**L** 0-1	Griman (1–0)	**Freeman** (0–1)	None	FloSoftball		1-7	
Feb. 15	vs. Akron		R. O. C. Park • Madiera Beach, FL	**L** 6-8	Smith (1–0)	**Parson** (0–1)	None	FloSoftball		1-8	
Feb. 16	vs. Monmouth		R. O. C. Park • Madiera Beach, FL	**W** 8-4	**Buck** (1–3)	Gletow (1-1)	None	FloSoftball		2-8	
Feb. 19	Georgia Tech		Robert E. Heck Softball Complex • Panthersville, GA	Game Postponed							
Mercer Tournament
Feb. 21	vs. Bryant		Sikes Field • Macon, GA	**W** 11-4	**Buck** (2–3)	McKeveny (0–3)	None		75	3-8	
Feb. 22	vs. Akron		Sikes Field • Macon, GA	**L** 0-1	Smith (3–5)	**Freeman** (0–2)	None		69	3-9	
Feb. 22	at Mercer		Sikes Field • Macon, GA	**L** 0-8	Pattison (5–1)	**Buck** (2–4)	None		212	3-10	
Feb. 23	vs. Presbyterian		Sikes Field • Macon, GA	**L** 2-8	Greene (8–0)	**Buck** (2–4)	None		108	3-11	
I-75 Challenge
Feb. 28	Penn State		Robert E. Heck Softball Complex • Panthersville, GA	**L** 1-3	Parshall (3-3)	**Freeman** (0–3)	None		97	3-12	
Feb. 28	Penn State		Robert E. Heck Softball Complex • Panthersville, GA	**L** 0-3	Oatley (2–4)	**Buck** (2–6)	None		97	3-13	
Feb. 29	Rider		Robert E. Heck Softball Complex • Panthersville, GA	**W** 9-0 (5 inn)	**Mooney** (2–3)	Trujillo-Quintana (0–3)	None		141	4-13	
Feb. 29	Rider		Robert E. Heck Softball Complex • Panthersville, GA	**W** 7-3	**Buck** (3–6)	Cal (0–1)	None		132	5-13	

March (1–4)
Date	Opponent	Rank	Site/stadium	Score	Win	Loss	Save	TV	Attendance	Overall record	SBC record
Mar. 1	Iowa State		Robert E. Heck Softball Complex • Panthersville, GA	**W** 1-0	**Freeman** (1–3)	Jasso (4–2)	None		137	6-13	
Mar. 4	Kennesaw State		Robert E. Heck Softball Complex • Panthersville, GA	Game Postponed							
Mar. 6	Texas State		Robert E. Heck Softball Complex • Panthersville, GA	**L** 0-16 (6 inn)	Barrera (5–2)	**Freeman** (1–4)	None		215	6-14	0–1
Mar. 7	Texas State		Robert E. Heck Softball Complex • Panthersville, GA	**W** 3-1	**Mooney** (3-3)	McCann (5–4)	None		132	7-14	1-1
Mar. 8	Texas State		Robert E. Heck Softball Complex • Panthersville, GA	**L** 0-7	King (5–2)	**Buck** (3–7)	None		143	7-15	1–2
Mar. 11	at Auburn		Robert E. Heck Softball Complex • Panthersville, GA	**L** 1-2	Handley (4–6)	**Mooney** (3–4)	None		1,356	7-16	
Mar. 13	at South Alabama		Jaguar Field • Mobile, AL	Season suspended due to COVID-19 pandemic							
Mar. 14	at South Alabama		Jaguar Field • Mobile, AL	Season suspended due to COVID-19 pandemic							
Mar. 15	at South Alabama		Jaguar Field • Mobile, AL	Season suspended due to COVID-19 pandemic							
Mar. 18	at Clemson		Clemson Softball Stadium • Clemson, SC	Season suspended due to COVID-19 pandemic							
Mar. 20	No. 8 Louisiana		Robert E. Heck Softball Complex • Panthersville, GA	Season suspended due to COVID-19 pandemic							
Mar. 21	No. 8 Louisiana		Robert E. Heck Softball Complex • Panthersville, GA	Season suspended due to COVID-19 pandemic							
Mar. 22	No. 8 Louisiana		Robert E. Heck Softball Complex • Panthersville, GA	Season suspended due to COVID-19 pandemic							
Mar. 25	at Chattanooga		Jim Frost Stadium • Chattanooga, TN	Season suspended due to COVID-19 pandemic							
Mar. 27	at Appalachian State		Sywassink/Lloyd Family Stadium • Boone, NC	Season suspended due to COVID-19 pandemic							
Mar. 28	at Appalachian State		Sywassink/Lloyd Family Stadium • Boone, NC	Season suspended due to COVID-19 pandemic							
Mar. 29	at Appalachian State		Sywassink/Lloyd Family Stadium • Boone, NC	Season suspended due to COVID-19 pandemic							

April (0–0)
Date	Opponent	Rank	Site/stadium	Score	Win	Loss	Save	TV	Attendance	Overall record	SBC record
Apr. 1	at Georgia Tech		Shirley Clements Mewborn Stadium • Atlanta, GA	Season suspended due to COVID-19 pandemic							
Apr. 3	Troy		Robert E. Heck Softball Complex • Panthersville, GA	Season suspended due to COVID-19 pandemic							
Apr. 4	Troy		Robert E. Heck Softball Complex • Panthersville, GA	Season suspended due to COVID-19 pandemic							
Apr. 5	Troy		Robert E. Heck Softball Complex • Panthersville, GA	Season suspended due to COVID-19 pandemic							
Apr. 9	at UT Arlington		Allan Saxe Field • Arlington, TX	Season suspended due to COVID-19 pandemic							
Apr. 10	at UT Arlington		Allan Saxe Field • Arlington, TX	Season suspended due to COVID-19 pandemic							
Apr. 11	at UT Arlington		Allan Saxe Field • Arlington, TX	Season suspended due to COVID-19 pandemic							
Apr. 15	at No. 14 Georgia		Jack Turner Stadium • Athens, GA	Season suspended due to COVID-19 pandemic							
Apr. 17	Coastal Carolina		Robert E. Heck Softball Complex • Atlanta, GA	Season suspended due to COVID-19 pandemic							
Apr. 18	Coastal Carolina		Robert E. Heck Softball Complex • Panthersville, GA	Season suspended due to COVID-19 pandemic							
Apr. 19	Coastal Carolina		Robert E. Heck Softball Complex • Panthersville, GA	Season suspended due to COVID-19 pandemic							
Apr. 22	at Kennesaw State		Bailey Softball Complex • Kennesaw GA	Season suspended due to COVID-19 pandemic							
Apr. 24	at Louisiana–Monroe		Geo-Surfaces Field at the ULM Softball Complex • Monroe, LA	Season suspended due to COVID-19 pandemic							
Apr. 25	at Louisiana–Monroe		Geo-Surfaces Field at the ULM Softball Complex • Monroe, LA	Season suspended due to COVID-19 pandemic							
Apr. 26	at Louisiana–Monroe		Geo-Surfaces Field at the ULM Softball Complex • Monroe, LA	Season suspended due to COVID-19 pandemic							
Apr. 30	Georgia Southern		Robert E. Heck Softball Complex • Panthersville, GA	Season suspended due to COVID-19 pandemic							

May (0-0)
Date	Opponent	Rank	Site/stadium	Score	Win	Loss	Save	TV	Attendance	Overall record	SBC record
May 1	Georgia Southern		Robert E. Heck Softball Complex • Panthersville, GA	Season suspended due to COVID-19 pandemic							
May 2	Georgia Southern		Robert E. Heck Softball Complex • Panthersville, GA	Season suspended due to COVID-19 pandemic							

Post-Season (0-0)

SBC tournament (0-0)
Date	Opponent	(Seed)/Rank	Site/stadium	Score	Win	Loss	Save	TV	Attendance	Overall record	SBC record
May 6	TBD		Robert E. Heck Softball Complex • Panthersville, GA	Championship Series canceled to COVID-19 pandemic							

Schedule source:

*Rankings are based on the team's current ranking in the NFCA/USA Softball poll.
