= 2020 Appalachian State Mountaineers softball team =

American college softball season

2020 Appalachian State Mountaineers softball
- Conference: Sun Belt Conference
- Record: 13–9 (1–2 SBC)
- Head coach: Shelly Hoerner (3rd season)
- Assistant coaches: Shane Showalter; Amanda Fefel
- Home stadium: Sywassink/Lloyd Family Stadium

2020 Sun Belt Conference softball standings
	Conf.				Overall
Team	W		L	PCT	W		L	PCT
No. 8 Louisiana ‍‍‍	2	–	1	.667	18	–	6	.750
Texas State ‍‍‍	2	–	1	.667	15	–	9	.625
Georgia Southern ‍‍‍	2	–	1	.667	14	–	10	.583
UT Arlington ‍‍‍	2	–	1	.667	12	–	13	.480
South Alabama ‍‍‍	2	–	1	.667	8	–	17	.320
Troy ‍‍‍	1	–	2	.333	16	–	6	.727
Coastal Carolina ‍‍‍	1	–	2	.333	13	–	8	.619
Appalachian State ‍‍‍	1	–	2	.333	13	–	9	.591
Louisiana–Monroe ‍‍‍	1	–	2	.333	10	–	14	.417
Georgia State ‍‍‍	1	–	2	.333	7	–	16	.304
† – Conference champion ‡ – Tournament champion y – Invited to the NCAA tournament As of March 13, 2020; Rankings from NFCA

The 2020 Appalachian State Mountaineers softball team represented Appalachian State University in the 2020 NCAA Division I softball season. The Mountaineers played their home games at Sywassink/Lloyd Family Stadium. The Mountaineers were led by third year head coach Shelly Hoerner and were members of the Sun Belt Conference.

On March 12, the Sun Belt Conference announced the indefinite suspension of all spring athletics, including softball, due to the increasing risk of the COVID-19 pandemic. On March 16, the Sun Belt formally announced the cancelation of all spring sports, thus ending their season definitely.

== Preseason ==
=== Sun Belt Conference Coaches Poll ===
The Sun Belt Conference Coaches Poll was released on January 29, 2020. Appalachain State was picked to finish sixth in the Sun Belt Conference with 47 votes.

Coaches poll
Predicted finish	Team	Votes (1st place)
1	Louisiana	100 (10)
2	Troy	85
3	UT Arlington	77
4	Texas State	74
5	Coastal Carolina	56
6	Appalachian State	47
7	Georgia Southern	36
8	South Alabama	31
9	Louisiana-Monroe	26
10	Georgia State	18

=== Preseason All-Sun Belt team ===
- Summer Ellyson (LA, SR, Pitcher)
- Megan Kleist (LA, SR, Pitcher)
- Julie Rawls (LA, SR, Catcher)
- Reagan Wright (UTA, SR, Catcher)
- Katie Webb (TROY, SR, 1st Base)
- Kaitlyn Alderink (LA, SR, 2nd Base)
- Hailey Mackay (TXST, SR, 3rd Base)
- Alissa Dalton (LA, SR, Shortstop)
- Jayden Mount (ULM, SR, Shortstop)
- Whitney Walton (UTA, SR, Shortstop)
- Tara Oltmann (TXST, JR, Shortstop)
- Courtney Dean (CCU, JR, Outfield)
- Mekhia Freeman (GASO, SR, Outfield)
- Sarah Hudek (LA, SR, Outfield)
- Raina O'Neal (LA, JR, Outfield)
- Bailey Curry (LA, JR, Designated Player/1st Base)

=== National Softball Signing Day ===
Player	Position	Hometown	Previous Team
Delani Buckner	Pitcher	Elkview, West Virginia	Herbert Hoover HS
Claire Carson	Outfielder	Sharpsburg, Georgia	Trinity Christian
Shelby Cornett	Outfielder	Raleigh, North Carolina	Middle Creek HS
Abby Cunningham	Outfielder	Greenfield, Wisconsin	Whitehall HS
Kayt Houston	Outfielder	Rock Hill, South Carolina	South Pointe HS
Emma Jones	Pitcher	Anniston, Alabama	White Plains HS
Allie Sewell	Infielder	Cumming, Georgia	Lambert HS
Shelbi Tucker	Catcher	Chino Hills, California	Ruben S. Ayala HS

== Roster ==
2020 Appalachian State Mountaineers roster
Pitchers: 1 Kenzie Longanecker - Senior; 2 Taylor Nichols - Sophomore; 7 Camryn Brazile - Freshman; 11 Maddie Siemer - Senior; 13 Sydney Holland - Senior; Outfielders: 4 Emily Parrott - Freshman; 10 Gabby Buruato - Senior; 16 Mary Pierce Barnes - Sophomore; 22 Kati Waalk - Redshirt Freshman	Catchers: 18 Taylor Thorp - Redshirt Freshman; 27 Baylee Morton - Junior; 41 Camryn Jones - Freshman; Infielders: 3 Keri White - Senior; 5 Caylie Kifer - Senior; 21 Maegan Calandra - Freshman; 29 Sydney Russell - Senior; Utility: 14 Addison Jones - Freshman; 25 Alison Durrence - Sophomore

=== Coaching staff ===
2020 Appalachian State Mountaineers coaching staff
- Shelly Hoerner – Head Coach – 3rd year
- Shane Showalter – Assistant Head Coach – 3rd year
- Amanda Fefel – Assistant Head Coach – 1st year
- Tyler O'Dell – Volunteer Assistant Coach

== Schedule and results ==
Legend
	Appalachian State win
	Appalachian State loss
	Postponement/Cancellation/Suspensions
**Bold**	Appalachian State team member

2020 Appalachian State Mountaineers softball game log
Regular season (13-9)

February (10-7)
Date	Opponent	Rank	Site/stadium	Score	Win	Loss	Save	TV	Attendance	Overall record	SBC record
Charlotte Invitational
Feb. 8	vs. Virginia		Sue M. Daughtridge Stadium • Charlotte, NC	**W** 1-0	**Holland** (1-0)	Grube (0-1)	None		188	1-0	
Feb. 9	at Charlotte		Sue M. Daughtridge Stadium • Charlotte, NC	**L** 5-9	Green (1-0)	**Longanecker** (0-1)	Pace (1)		225	1-1	
Feb. 9	vs. Virginia		Sue M. Daughtridge Stadium • Charlotte, NC	**L** 7-9	Rayle (2-0)	**Longanecker** (0-2)	None		280	1-2	
Feb. 9	at Charlotte		Sue M. Daughtridge Stadium • Charlotte, NC	**W** 4-1	**Holland** (2-0)	Pace (0-2)	None	CUSA.TV	300	2-2	
D9 Citrus Blossom Tournament
Feb. 14	vs. Bethune-Cookman		ESPN Wide World of Sports Complex • Orlando, FL	**W** 1-0	**Holland** (3-0)	Enriquez (0-4)	None			3-2	
Feb. 14	vs. Charleston Southern		ESPN Wide World of Sports Complex • Orlando, FL	**W** 4-0	**Longanecker** (1-2)	Heinrich (0-1)	None			4-2	
Feb. 15	vs. Lehigh		ESPN Wide World of Sports Complex • Orlando, FL	**W** 2-1 (8 inn)	**Nichols** (1-0)	Boyd (1-1)	None			5-2	
Feb. 15	vs. Saint Joseph's		ESPN Wide World of Sports Complex • Orlando, FL	**W** 10-3	**Holland** (4-0)	Herr (1-2)	None			6-2	
Feb. 16	vs. Bethune-Cookman		ESPN Wide World of Sports Complex • Orlando, FL	**W** 2-0	**Longanecker** (2-2)	Guzman (1-2)	None			7-2	
Charleston Invitational
Feb. 21	vs. Bradley		CSU Softball Complex • Charleston, SC	**L** 0-2	French (3-0)	**Longanecker** (2-3)	None		77	7-3	
Feb. 21	at Charleston Southern		CSU Softball Complex • Charleston, SC	**W** 2-0	**Holland** (5-0)	Heinrich (0-4)	None			8-3	
Feb. 22	vs. North Carolina A&T		Patriots Point Athletics Complex • Mount Pleasant, SC	**L** 5-7	Douglas (1-2)	**Holland** (5-1)	None		427	8-4	
Feb. 22	at College of Charleston		Patriots Point Athletics Complex • Mount Pleasant, SC	**L** 0-1	Jenkins (2-1)	**Longanecker** (2-4)	None		427	8-5	
Feb. 23	vs. Ohio		Patriots Point Athletics Complex • Mount Pleasant, SC	**W** 9-1 (6 inn)	**Holland** (6-1)	Thornhill (1-4)	None		200	9-5	
Spartan Classic
Feb. 28	vs. Oakland		UNCG Softball Stadium • Greensboro, NC	**W** 4-3	**Longanecker** (3-4)	Wiggins (1-2)	None		114	10-5	
Feb. 29	vs. Oakland		UNCG Softball Stadium • Greensboro, NC	**L** 1-8	Campbell (5-1)	**Holland** (6-2)	None		122	10-6	
Feb. 29	vs. Dayton		UNCG Softball Stadium • Greensboro, NC	**L** 0-2	Weaver (3-2)	**Longanecker** (3-5)	None		113	10-7	

March (3-2)
Date	Opponent	Rank	Site/stadium	Score	Win	Loss	Save	TV	Attendance	Overall record	SBC record
Mar. 1	at UNC Greensboro		UNCG Softball Stadium • Greensboro, NC	**W** 2-1	**Holland** (7-2)	Scott (6-4)	None		427	11-7	
Mar. 4	Virginia Tech		Sywassink/Lloyd Family Stadium • Boone, NC	Game Cancelled							
Mar. 6	at South Alabama		Jaguar Field • Mobile, AL	**L** 6-10	Hutchins (4-4)	**Nichols** (1-1)	None	JagNation TV	340	11-8	0-1
Mar. 7	at South Alabama		Jaguar Field • Mobile, AL	**L** 9-13	Hutchins (5-4)	**Siemer** (0-1)	None	JagNation TV	409	11-9	0-2
Mar. 8	at South Alabama		Jaguar Field • Mobile, AL	**W** 5-2	**Longanecker** (4-5)	Hardy (2-6)	None	JagNation TV	440	12-9	1-2
Mar. 11	at Southeastern Louisiana		North Oak Park • Hammond, LA	**W** 4-3	**Holland** (8-2)	McDonald (3-1)	**Longanecker** (1)	Southeastern Sports Network	231	13-9	
Mar. 13	at No. 8 Louisiana		Yvette Girouard Field at Lamson Park • Lafayette, LA	Season suspended due to COVID-19 pandemic							
Mar. 14	at No. 8 Louisiana		Yvette Girouard Field at Lamson Park • Lafayette, LA	Season suspended due to COVID-19 pandemic							
Mar. 15	at No. 8 Louisiana		Yvette Girouard Field at Lamson Park • Lafayette, LA	Season suspended due to COVID-19 pandemic							
Mar. 18	Western Carolina		Sywassink/Lloyd Family Stadium • Boone, NC	Season suspended due to COVID-19 pandemic							
Mar. 18	Western Carolina		Sywassink/Lloyd Family Stadium • Boone, NC	Season suspended due to COVID-19 pandemic							
Mar. 20	at UT Arlington		Allan Saxe Field • Arlington, TX	Season suspended due to COVID-19 pandemic							
Mar. 21	at UT Arlington		Allan Saxe Field • Arlington, TX	Season suspended due to COVID-19 pandemic							
Mar. 22	at UT Arlington		Allan Saxe Field • Arlington, TX	Season suspended due to COVID-19 pandemic							
Mar. 25	at North Carolina Central		Thomas Brooke Stadium • Durham, NC	Season suspended due to COVID-19 pandemic							
Mar. 25	at North Carolina Central		Thomas Brooke Stadium • Durham, NC	Season suspended due to COVID-19 pandemic							
Mar. 27	Georgia State		Sywassink/Lloyd Family Stadium • Boone, NC	Season suspended due to COVID-19 pandemic							
Mar. 28	Georgia State		Sywassink/Lloyd Family Stadium • Boone, NC	Season suspended due to COVID-19 pandemic							
Mar. 29	Georgia State		Sywassink/Lloyd Family Stadium • Boone, NC	Season suspended due to COVID-19 pandemic							

April (0–0)
Date	Opponent	Rank	Site/stadium	Score	Win	Loss	Save	TV	Attendance	Overall record	SBC record
Apr. 1	at North Carolina A&T		Aggie Softball Complex • Greensboro, NC	Season suspended due to COVID-19 pandemic							
Apr. 1	at North Carolina A&T		Aggie Softball Complex • Greensboro, NC	Season suspended due to COVID-19 pandemic							
Apr. 3	Louisiana–Monroe		Sywassink/Lloyd Family Stadium • Boone, NC	Season suspended due to COVID-19 pandemic							
Apr. 4	Louisiana–Monroe		Sywassink/Lloyd Family Stadium • Boone, NC	Season suspended due to COVID-19 pandemic							
Apr. 5	Louisiana–Monroe		Sywassink/Lloyd Family Stadium • Boone, NC	Season suspended due to COVID-19 pandemic							
Apr. 7	East Tennessee State		Sywassink/Lloyd Family Stadium • Boone, NC	Season suspended due to COVID-19 pandemic							
Apr. 9	Texas State		Sywassink/Lloyd Family Stadium • Boone, NC	Season suspended due to COVID-19 pandemic							
Apr. 10	Texas State		Sywassink/Lloyd Family Stadium • Boone, NC	Season suspended due to COVID-19 pandemic							
Apr. 11	Texas State		Sywassink/Lloyd Family Stadium • Boone, NC	Season suspended due to COVID-19 pandemic							
Apr. 14	at East Tennessee State		Betty Basler Field • Johnson City, TN	Season suspended due to COVID-19 pandemic							
Apr. 17	Troy		Sywassink/Lloyd Family Stadium • Boone, NC	Season suspended due to COVID-19 pandemic							
Apr. 18	Troy		Sywassink/Lloyd Family Stadium • Boone, NC	Season suspended due to COVID-19 pandemic							
Apr. 19	Troy		Sywassink/Lloyd Family Stadium • Boone, NC	Season suspended due to COVID-19 pandemic							
Apr. 22	at UNC Greensboro		UNCG Softball Stadium • Greensboro, NC	Season suspended due to COVID-19 pandemic							
Apr. 24	Georgia Southern		Sywassink/Lloyd Family Stadium • Boone, NC	Season suspended due to COVID-19 pandemic							
Apr. 25	Georgia Southern		Sywassink/Lloyd Family Stadium • Boone, NC	Season suspended due to COVID-19 pandemic							
Apr. 26	Georgia Southern		Sywassink/Lloyd Family Stadium • Boone, NC	Season suspended due to COVID-19 pandemic							
Apr. 30	Coastal Carolina		Sywassink/Lloyd Family Stadium • Boone, NC	Season suspended due to COVID-19 pandemic							

May (0-0)
Date	Opponent	Rank	Site/stadium	Score	Win	Loss	Save	TV	Attendance	Overall record	SBC record
May 1	Coastal Carolina		Sywassink/Lloyd Family Stadium • Boone, NC	Season suspended due to COVID-19 pandemic							
May 2	Coastal Carolina		Sywassink/Lloyd Family Stadium • Boone, NC	Season suspended due to COVID-19 pandemic							

Post-Season (0-0)

SBC tournament (0-0)
Date	Opponent	(Seed)/Rank	Site/stadium	Score	Win	Loss	Save	TV	Attendance	Overall record	SBC record
May 6	TBD		Robert E. Heck Softball Complex • Atlanta, GA	Championship Series canceled to COVID-19 pandemic							

Schedule source:

*Rankings are based on the team's current ranking in the NFCA/USA Softball poll.
