= 2020 Coastal Carolina Chanticleers softball team =

American college softball season

2020 Coastal Carolina Chanticleers softball
- Conference: Sun Belt Conference
- Record: 13–8 (1–2 SBC)
- Head coach: Kelley Green (11th season)
- Assistant coaches: Danielle Penner; Kristin Erb
- Home stadium: St. John Stadium – Charles Wade-John Lott Field

2020 Sun Belt Conference softball standings
	Conf.				Overall
Team	W		L	PCT	W		L	PCT
No. 8 Louisiana ‍‍‍	2	–	1	.667	18	–	6	.750
Texas State ‍‍‍	2	–	1	.667	15	–	9	.625
Georgia Southern ‍‍‍	2	–	1	.667	14	–	10	.583
UT Arlington ‍‍‍	2	–	1	.667	12	–	13	.480
South Alabama ‍‍‍	2	–	1	.667	8	–	17	.320
Troy ‍‍‍	1	–	2	.333	16	–	6	.727
Coastal Carolina ‍‍‍	1	–	2	.333	13	–	8	.619
Appalachian State ‍‍‍	1	–	2	.333	13	–	9	.591
Louisiana–Monroe ‍‍‍	1	–	2	.333	10	–	14	.417
Georgia State ‍‍‍	1	–	2	.333	7	–	16	.304
† – Conference champion ‡ – Tournament champion y – Invited to the NCAA tournament As of March 13, 2020; Rankings from NFCA

The 2020 Coastal Carolina Chanticleers softball team represented Coastal Carolina University in the 2020 NCAA Division I softball season. The Chanticleers played their home games at St. John Stadium – Charles Wade-John Lott Field. The Chanticleers were led by eleventh year head coach Kelley Green and were members of the Sun Belt Conference.

On March 12, the Sun Belt Conference announced the indefinite suspension of all spring athletics, including softball, due to the increasing risk of the COVID-19 pandemic. On March 16, the Sun Belt formally announced the cancelation of all spring sports, thus ending their season definitely.

== Preseason ==
=== Sun Belt Conference Coaches Poll ===
The Sun Belt Conference Coaches Poll was released on January 29, 2020. Coastal Carolina was picked to finish fifth in the Sun Belt Conference with 56 votes.

Coaches poll
Predicted finish	Team	Votes (1st place)
1	Louisiana	100 (10)
2	Troy	85
3	UT Arlington	77
4	Texas State	74
5	Coastal Carolina	56
6	Appalachian State	47
7	Georgia Southern	36
8	South Alabama	31
9	Louisiana-Monroe	26
10	Georgia State	18

=== Preseason All-Sun Belt team ===
- Summer Ellyson (LA, SR, Pitcher)
- Megan Kleist (LA, SR, Pitcher)
- Julie Rawls (LA, SR, Catcher)
- Reagan Wright (UTA, SR, Catcher)
- Katie Webb (TROY, SR, 1st Base)
- Kaitlyn Alderink (LA, SR, 2nd Base)
- Hailey Mackay (TXST, SR, 3rd Base)
- Alissa Dalton (LA, SR, Shortstop)
- Jayden Mount (ULM, SR, Shortstop)
- Whitney Walton (UTA, SR, Shortstop)
- Tara Oltmann (TXST, JR, Shortstop)
- Courtney Dean (CCU, JR, Outfield)
- Mekhia Freeman (GASO, SR, Outfield)
- Sarah Hudek (LA, SR, Outfield)
- Raina O'Neal (LA, JR, Outfield)
- Bailey Curry (LA, JR, Designated Player/1st Base)

=== National Softball Signing Day ===
Player	Position	Hometown	Previous Team
Ally Clegg	Infielder	Leesburg, Georgia	Chipola College
Jade Soto	Utility	Fort Myers, Florida	Bishop Verot HS
Kiya Thomas	Infielder	Tacoma, Washington	Central Arizona College
Payton Ebersole	Outfielder	Dillsburg, Pennsylvania	Northern HS
Madison Hudson	Outfielder	Lithia, Florida	Bryon Nelson HS
Jordan Thompson	Catcher	Asburn, Virginia	Stonebridge HS
Riley Zana	Infielder	Elyria, Ohio	Elyria HS

== Roster ==
2020 Coastal Carolina Chanticleers roster
Pitchers: 4 Gabby Baylog - Freshman; 10 Ally Marcano - Senior; 17 Raelee Brabham - Freshman; 34 Iyanla de Jesus - Freshman; 99 Kaitlin Beasley-Polko - Junior; Outfielders: 2 Stavi Augur - Junior; 6 Courtney Dean - Junior; 8 Sydney Guess - Sophomore; 9 Paige Rivas - Freshman; 11 Peyton Rivas - Freshman; 16 Adrienne Visintine - Sophomore; 22 Jade Soto - Freshman	Catchers: 14 Kassidy Smith - Senior; 33 Mackenzie Beyer - Sophomore; Infielders: 00 Kendall Coyle - Sophomore; 1 Ally Clegg - Junior; 3 Mary Sobataka - Freshman; 5 Makiya Thomas - Junior; 7 Allison Kreyer - Sophomore; 24 Abbey Montoya - Sophomore; 45 Taylor Sweigart - Junior; 61 Shelbie Summerlin - Freshman; Utility: 26 Michaela McAuley - Senior

=== Coaching staff ===
2020 Coastal Carolina Chanticleers coaching staff
- Kelley Green – Head Coach – 11th year
- Danielle Penner – Associate head coach – 3rd year
- Kristin Erb – Assistant Head Coach – 8th year
- Amandad Daneker – Volunteer Assistant Coach – 2nd year
- Blake Schultz – Director of Operations – 2nd year

== Schedule and results ==
Legend
	Coastal Carolina win
	Coastal Carolina loss
	Postponement/Cancellation/Suspensions
**Bold**	Coastal Carolina team member

2020 Coastal Carolina Chanticleers softball game log
Regular season (13-8)

February (12-4)
Date	Opponent	Rank	Site/stadium	Score	Win	Loss	Save	TV	Attendance	Overall record	SBC record
Kickin' Chicken Classic
Feb. 7	Virginia Tech		St. John Stadium – Charles Wade-John Lott Field • Conway, SC	**L** 2-11	Rochard (1-0)	Beasley-Polko (0-1)	None		217	0-1	
Feb. 8	Iowa		St. John Stadium – Charles Wade-John Lott Field • Conway, SC	**L** 1-2 (8 inn)	Doocy (1-0)	**Beasley-Polko** (0-2)	None		256	0-2	
Feb. 8	East Carolina		St. John Stadium – Charles Wade-John Lott Field • Conway, SC	**W** 8-1	**Brabham** (1-0)	Woodall (0-1)	None		256	1-2	
Feb. 9	Campbell		St. John Stadium – Charles Wade-John Lott Field • Conway, SC	**L** 3-4	Barefoot (1-2)	**Beasley-Polko** (0-3)	None		312	1-3	
Battle at the Beach
Feb. 14	Jacksonville State		St. John Stadium – Charles Wade-John Lott Field • Conway, SC	**W** 8-6	**Marcano** (1-0)	Bearden (0-2)	None		256	2-3	
Feb. 15	Northern Illinois		St. John Stadium – Charles Wade-John Lott Field • Conway, SC	**W** 15-2 (5 inn)	**Brabham** (2-0)	Ostrowski (2-3)	None		338	3-3	
Feb. 15	Delaware State		St. John Stadium – Charles Wade-John Lott Field • Conway, SC	**W** 10-0 (5 inn)	**Brabham** (3-0)	Diao (0-1)	None		338	4-3	
Feb. 16	Delaware State		St. John Stadium – Charles Wade-John Lott Field • Conway, SC	**W** 13-0 (5 inn)	**Beasley-Polko** (1-3)	Diao (0-2)	None		298	5-3	
Feb. 16	College of Charleston		St. John Stadium – Charles Wade-John Lott Field • Conway, SC	Game Cancelled							
Chanticleer Showdown
Feb. 21	Seton Hall		St. John Stadium – Charles Wade-John Lott Field • Conway, SC	**W** 6-4	**Beasley-Polko** (2-3)	Gumm (1-3)	**Marcano** (1)		223	6-3	
Feb. 22	Seton Hall		St. John Stadium – Charles Wade-John Lott Field • Conway, SC	**W** 7-0	**Brabham** (3-0)	Camp (0-4)	None		212	7-3	
Feb. 22	Iona		St. John Stadium – Charles Wade-John Lott Field • Conway, SC	**W** 2-0	**Beasley-Polko** (3-3)	Evans (0-1)	None		212	8-3	
Feb. 23	UMBC		St. John Stadium – Charles Wade-John Lott Field • Conway, SC	**W** 4-0	**Brabham** (4-0)	Leach (1-1)	None		256	9-3	
Feb. 25	at Presbyterian		PC Softball Complex • Clinton, SC	Game Cancelled							
Barefoot Landing Invitational
Feb. 28	Monmouth		St. John Stadium – Charles Wade-John Lott Field • Conway, SC	**W** 5-4	**Brabham** (6-0)	Irons (4-3)	**Marcano** (2)		214	10-3	
Feb. 28	Ohio		St. John Stadium – Charles Wade-John Lott Field • Conway, SC	**W** 8-3	**Beasley-Polko** (4-3)	Thornhill (1-5)	None		214	11-3	
Feb. 29	Ohio		St. John Stadium – Charles Wade-John Lott Field • Conway, SC	**L** 5-13	McCrady (5-3)	**Brabham** (6-1)	None		236	11-4	
Feb. 29	Maryland Eastern Shore		St. John Stadium – Charles Wade-John Lott Field • Conway, SC	**W** 8-0	**Marcano** (2-0)	Gingrich (0-6)	None		236	12-4	

March (1-4)
Date	Opponent	Rank	Site/stadium	Score	Win	Loss	Save	TV	Attendance	Overall record	SBC record
Mar. 1	USC Upstate		St. John Stadium – Charles Wade-John Lott Field • Conway, SC	**L** 5-9	Hill (5-2)	**Brabham** (6-2)	None		310	12-5	
Mar. 4	at Winthrop		Terry Field • Rock Hill, SC	Game Postponed							
Mar. 6	No. 8 Louisiana		St. John Stadium – Charles Wade-John Lott Field • Conway, SC	**W** 7-1	**Marcano** (9-2)	Kleist (5-5)	None		243	13-5	1-0
Mar. 7	No. 8 Louisiana		St. John Stadium – Charles Wade-John Lott Field • Conway, SC	**L** 0-5	Ellyson (10-1)	**Beasley-Polko** (4-4)	None		356	13-6	1-1
Mar. 8	No. 8 Louisiana		St. John Stadium – Charles Wade-John Lott Field • Conway, SC	**L** 2-10 (5 inn)	Kleist (6-5)	**Beasley-Polko** (4-5)	None		342	13-7	1-2
Mar. 10	No. 16 South Carolina		St. John Stadium – Charles Wade-John Lott Field • Conway, SC	**L** 2-10 (5 inn)	Ochs (5-3)	**Brabham** (6-3)	None		538	13-8	
Mar. 13	at Texas State		Bobcat Softball Stadium • San Marcos, TX	Season suspended due to COVID-19 pandemic							
Mar. 14	at Texas State		Bobcat Softball Stadium • San Marcos, TX	Season suspended due to COVID-19 pandemic							
Mar. 15	at Texas State		Bobcat Softball Stadium • San Marcos, TX	Season suspended due to COVID-19 pandemic							
Mar. 17	Florida State		St. John Stadium – Charles Wade-John Lott Field • Conway, SC	Season suspended due to COVID-19 pandemic							
Mar. 20	Georgia Southern		St. John Stadium – Charles Wade-John Lott Field • Conway, SC	Season suspended due to COVID-19 pandemic							
Mar. 21	Georgia Southern		St. John Stadium – Charles Wade-John Lott Field • Conway, SC	Season suspended due to COVID-19 pandemic							
Mar. 22	Georgia Southern		St. John Stadium – Charles Wade-John Lott Field • Conway, SC	Season suspended due to COVID-19 pandemic							
Mar. 25	College of Charleston		St. John Stadium – Charles Wade-John Lott Field • Conway, SC	Season suspended due to COVID-19 pandemic							
Mar. 27	at Troy		Troy Softball Complex • Troy, AL	Season suspended due to COVID-19 pandemic							
Mar. 28	at Troy		Troy Softball Complex • Troy, AL	Season suspended due to COVID-19 pandemic							
Mar. 29	at Troy		Troy Softball Complex • Troy, AL	Season suspended due to COVID-19 pandemic							
Mar. 31	Charleston Southern		St. John Stadium – Charles Wade-John Lott Field • Conway, SC	Season suspended due to COVID-19 pandemic							
Mar. 31	Charleston Southern		St. John Stadium – Charles Wade-John Lott Field • Conway, SC	Season suspended due to COVID-19 pandemic							

April (0–0)
Date	Opponent	Rank	Site/stadium	Score	Win	Loss	Save	TV	Attendance	Overall record	SBC record
Apr. 3	UT Arlington		St. John Stadium – Charles Wade-John Lott Field • Conway, SC	Season suspended due to COVID-19 pandemic							
Apr. 4	UT Arlington		St. John Stadium – Charles Wade-John Lott Field • Conway, SC	Season suspended due to COVID-19 pandemic							
Apr. 5	UT Arlington		St. John Stadium – Charles Wade-John Lott Field • Conway, SC	Season suspended due to COVID-19 pandemic							
Apr. 7	at Winthrop		Terry Field • Rock Hill, SC	Season suspended due to COVID-19 pandemic							
Apr. 9	at Louisiana–Monroe		Geo-Surfaces Field at the ULM Softball Complex • Monroe, LA	Season suspended due to COVID-19 pandemic							
Apr. 10	at Louisiana–Monroe		Geo-Surfaces Field at the ULM Softball Complex • Monroe, LA	Season suspended due to COVID-19 pandemic							
Apr. 11	at Louisiana–Monroe		Geo-Surfaces Field at the ULM Softball Complex • Monroe, LA	Season suspended due to COVID-19 pandemic							
Apr. 14	at UNC Wilmington		Boseman Field • Wilmington, NC	Season suspended due to COVID-19 pandemic							
Apr. 17	at Georgia State		Robert E. Heck Softball Complex • Atlanta, GA	Season suspended due to COVID-19 pandemic							
Apr. 18	at Georgia State		Robert E. Heck Softball Complex • Atlanta, GA	Season suspended due to COVID-19 pandemic							
Apr. 19	at Georgia State		Robert E. Heck Softball Complex • Atlanta, GA	Season suspended due to COVID-19 pandemic							
Apr. 24	South Alabama		St. John Stadium – Charles Wade-John Lott Field • Conway, SC	Season suspended due to COVID-19 pandemic							
Apr. 25	South Alabama		St. John Stadium – Charles Wade-John Lott Field • Conway, SC	Season suspended due to COVID-19 pandemic							
Apr. 26	South Alabama		St. John Stadium – Charles Wade-John Lott Field • Conway, SC	Season suspended due to COVID-19 pandemic							
Apr. 30	at Appalachian State		Sywassink/Lloyd Family Stadium • Boone, NC	Season suspended due to COVID-19 pandemic							

May (0-0)
Date	Opponent	Rank	Site/stadium	Score	Win	Loss	Save	TV	Attendance	Overall record	SBC record
May 1	at Appalachian State		Sywassink/Lloyd Family Stadium • Boone, NC	Season suspended due to COVID-19 pandemic							
May 2	at Appalachian State		Sywassink/Lloyd Family Stadium • Boone, NC	Season suspended due to COVID-19 pandemic							

Post-Season (0-0)

SBC tournament (0-0)
Date	Opponent	(Seed)/Rank	Site/stadium	Score	Win	Loss	Save	TV	Attendance	Overall record	SBC record
May 6	TBD		Robert E. Heck Softball Complex • Atlanta, GA	Championship Series canceled to COVID-19 pandemic							

Schedule source:

*Rankings are based on the team's current ranking in the NFCA/USA Softball poll.
