= 2020 UT Arlington Mavericks softball team =

American college softball season

2020 UT Arlington Mavericks softball
- Conference: Sun Belt Conference
- Record: 12–13 (2–1 SBC)
- Head coach: Peejay Brun (3rd season)
- Assistant coach: Miranda Kramer
- Home stadium: Allan Saxe Field

2020 Sun Belt Conference softball standings
	Conf.				Overall
Team	W		L	PCT	W		L	PCT
No. 8 Louisiana ‍‍‍	2	–	1	.667	18	–	6	.750
Texas State ‍‍‍	2	–	1	.667	15	–	9	.625
Georgia Southern ‍‍‍	2	–	1	.667	14	–	10	.583
UT Arlington ‍‍‍	2	–	1	.667	12	–	13	.480
South Alabama ‍‍‍	2	–	1	.667	8	–	17	.320
Troy ‍‍‍	1	–	2	.333	16	–	6	.727
Coastal Carolina ‍‍‍	1	–	2	.333	13	–	8	.619
Appalachian State ‍‍‍	1	–	2	.333	13	–	9	.591
Louisiana–Monroe ‍‍‍	1	–	2	.333	10	–	14	.417
Georgia State ‍‍‍	1	–	2	.333	7	–	16	.304
† – Conference champion ‡ – Tournament champion y – Invited to the NCAA tournament As of March 13, 2020; Rankings from NFCA

The 2020 UT Arlington Mavericks softball team represented the University of Texas at Arlington in the 2020 NCAA Division I softball season. The Mavericks played their home games at Allan Saxe Field. The Cajuns were led by third year head coach Peejay Brun.

On March 12, the Sun Belt Conference announced the indefinite suspension of all spring athletics, including softball, due to the increasing risk of the COVID-19 pandemic. On March 16, the Sun Belt formally announced the cancelation of all spring sports, thus ending their season definitely.

== Preseason ==
=== Sun Belt Conference Coaches Poll ===
The Sun Belt Conference Coaches Poll was released on January 29, 2020. UT Arlington was picked to finish third in the Sun Belt Conference with 77 votes.

Coaches poll
Predicted finish	Team	Votes (1st place)
1	Louisiana	100 (10)
2	Troy	85
3	UT Arlington	77
4	Texas State	74
5	Coastal Carolina	56
6	Appalachian State	47
7	Georgia Southern	36
8	South Alabama	31
9	Louisiana-Monroe	26
10	Georgia State	18

=== Preseason All-Sun Belt team ===
- Summer Ellyson (LA, SR, Pitcher)
- Megan Kleist (LA, SR, Pitcher)
- Julie Rawls (LA, SR, Catcher)
- Reagan Wright (UTA, SR, Catcher)
- Katie Webb (TROY, SR, 1st Base)
- Kaitlyn Alderink (LA, SR, 2nd Base)
- Hailey Mackay (TXST, SR, 3rd Base)
- Alissa Dalton (LA, SR, Shortstop)
- Jayden Mount (ULM, SR, Shortstop)
- Whitney Walton (UTA, SR, Shortstop)
- Tara Oltmann (TXST, JR, Shortstop)
- Courtney Dean (CCU, JR, Outfield)
- Mekhia Freeman (GASO, SR, Outfield)
- Sarah Hudek (LA, SR, Outfield)
- Raina O'Neal (LA, JR, Outfield)
- Bailey Curry (LA, JR, Designated Player/1st Base)

=== National Softball Signing Day ===
Player	Position	Hometown	Previous Team
Gracie Bumpers	Pitcher	Splendora, Texas	Splendora HS
Jessi Carreon	Infielder	College Station, Texas	College Station HS
Dariane Cram	Outfielder	Dickinson, Texas	Dickinson HS
Reese Scott	Outfielder	Sugar Land, Texas	George Ranch HS
Morgan Westbrook	Outfielder/Infielder	Houston, Texas	Stephen F. Austin HS
Sophie Wideman	Catcher	Woodway, Texas	Midway HS
Raegan Edwards	Pitcher/Infielder	Broken Arrow, Oklahoma	Broken Arrow HS

== Roster ==
2020 UT Arlington Mavericks roster
Pitchers: 00 Allie Gardiner - Sophomore; 3 JoJo Valencia - Senior; 15 RC Phillips - Junior; 19 Kenedy Hines - Freshman; 21 Laura Henriksen - Sophomore; Outfielders: 1 Melanie Mendoza - Senior; 4 Reagan Hukill - Freshman; 8 Jadyn Erickson - Freshman; 17 Amber Langston - Junior	Catchers: 10 Courtney Ogle - Junior; 20 Cielo Morin - Freshman; 23 Jaden Hoelker - Sophomore; Infielders: 6 Whitney Walton - Senior; 7 Madison Miller - Junior; 9 kJ Murphy - Junior; 11 Anjelica Gonzalez - Freshman; 14 Julissa Moreno - Freshman; 16 Aileen Garcia - Senior; 18 Kimber Cortemelia - Sophomore; 26 Emily Evans - Redshirt Sophomore; 27 Lindsey Franklin - Freshman; 34 Brittany Wyllie - Senior

=== Coaching staff ===
2020 UT Arlington Mavericks coaching staff
- Peejay Brun – Head Coach – 3rd year
- Miranda Kramer – Associate head coach – 1st year
- Megan Low – Volunteer Assistant Coach – 1st year
- Alix Ezell – Graduate Assistant
- Alex Dreher – Associate Athletic Trainer – 4th year

== Schedule and results ==
Legend
	UT Arlington win
	UT Arlington loss
	Postponement/Cancellation/Suspensions
**Bold**	UT Arlington team member

2020 UT Arlington Mavericks softball game log
Regular season (12-13)

February (8-11)
Date	Opponent	Rank	Site/stadium	Score	Win	Loss	Save	TV	Attendance	Overall record	SBC record
Aggie Classic
Feb. 7	at Texas A&M		Davis Diamond • College Station, TX	**L** 0-2	Herzog (1-0)	**Valencia** (0-1)	None		1,062	0-1	
Feb. 7	at Texas A&M		Davis Diamond • College Station, TX	**W** 7-2	**Gardiner** (1-0)	Potts (0-1)	None		1,062	1-1	
Feb. 8	at Texas A&M		Davis Diamond • College Station, TX	**W** 5-4	**Gardiner** (2-0)	McBride (0-1)	None		1,535	2-1	
Feb. 8	vs. Abilene Christian		Davis Diamond • College Station, TX	**L** 2-4	Sinnott (1-0)	**Phillips'** (0-1)	None			2-2	
Feb. 9	vs. Abilene Christian		Davis Diamond • College Station, TX	**W** 2-0	**Gardiner'** (3-0)	Bradley (0-1)	None			3-2	
Maverick Classic
Feb. 14	Texas Southern		Allan Saxe Field • Arlington, TX	**W** 8-0	**Phillips** (1-1)	Reyes (0-3)	None		480	4-2	
Feb. 15	Stephen F. Austin		Allan Saxe Field • Arlington, TX	**W** 11-3 (5 inn)	**Hines** (1-0)	Wilbur (1-2)	None		682	5-2	
Feb. 15	Kansas City		Allan Saxe Field • Arlington, TX	**W** 12-3 (5 inn)	**Valencia** (1-1)	Hoveland (0-1)	None		682	6-2	
Feb. 16	Kent State		Allan Saxe Field • Arlington, TX	**L** 0-1	Scali (2-1)	**Phillips** (1-2)	None		509	6-3	
Boerner Invitational
Feb. 21	UTSA		Allan Saxe Field • Arlington, TX	**L** 5-8	Cortez (3-2)	**Valencia** (1-2)	None		524	6-4	
Feb. 21	Rutgers		Allan Saxe Field • Arlington, TX	**W** 5-4	**Valencia** (2-2)	Hitchcock (3-2)	None		524	7-4	
Feb. 22	Kansas		Allan Saxe Field • Arlington, TX	**L** 3-8	Reed (2-3)	**Phillips** (1-3)	None		550	7-5	
Feb. 22	Kansas		Allan Saxe Field • Arlington, TX	**L** 1-4	Goff (3-3)	**Valencia** (2-3)	None		550	7-6	
Feb. 23	UTSA		Allan Saxe Field • Arlington, TX	**L** 7-8	Estell (1-0)	**Phillips** (1-4)	Cortez (1)			7-7	
Feb. 25	at RV North Texas		Lovelace Stadium • Denton, TX	**L** 1-10	Trautwein (7-1)	**Valencia** (2-4)	None		133	7-8	
Easton Crimson Classic
Feb. 28	vs. McNeese State		Rhoads Stadium • Tuscaloosa, AL	**L** 5-9	Settle (4-0)	**Hines** (1-1)	None		308	7-9	
Feb. 28	at No. 8 Alabama		Rhoads Stadium • Tuscaloosa, AL	**L** 3-11	Fouts (3-2)	**Valencia** (2-5)	None		193	7-10	
Feb. 29	vs. McNeese State		Rhoads Stadium • Tuscaloosa, AL	**W** 5-4	**Valencia** (3-5)	Flores (5-2)	**Gardiner** (1)		193	8-10	
Feb. 29	at No. 8 Alabama		Rhoads Stadium • Tuscaloosa, AL	**L** 2-3	Cornell (2-1)	**Hines** (1-2)	Goodman (1)			8-11	

March (4-2)
Date	Opponent	Rank	Site/stadium	Score	Win	Loss	Save	TV	Attendance	Overall record	SBC record
Mar. 1	vs. No. 7 Arizona		Rhoads Stadium • Tuscaloosa, AL	**L** 1-9	Denham (7-1)	**Valencia** (3-6)	None		398	8-12	
Mar. 3	at No. 21 Baylor		Getterman Stadium • Waco, TX	**W** 1-0	**Hines** (2-2)	Rodoni (7-3)	None		650	9-12	
Mar. 6	Troy		Allan Saxe Field • Arlington, TX	**L** 2-11	Johnson (9-2)	**Hines** (2-3)	None		344	9-13	0-1
Mar. 7	Troy		Allan Saxe Field • Arlington, TX	**W** 2-1	**Phillips** (2-4)	Blasingame (3-2)	None		386	10-13	1-1
Mar. 8	Troy		Allan Saxe Field • Arlington, TX	**W** 7-3	**Valencia** (4-6)	Johnson (9-3)	**Gardiner** (2)		378	11-13	2-1
Mar. 10	Western Kentucky		Allan Saxe Field • Arlington, TX	**W** 5-4	**Gardiner** (4-0)	Aikey (10-3)	**Hines** (1)			12-13	
Mar. 13	at Louisiana–Monroe		Geo-Surfaces Field at the ULM Softball Complex • Monroe, LA	Season suspended due to COVID-19 pandemic							
Mar. 14	at Louisiana–Monroe		Geo-Surfaces Field at the ULM Softball Complex • Monroe, LA	Season suspended due to COVID-19 pandemic							
Mar. 15	at Louisiana–Monroe		Geo-Surfaces Field at the ULM Softball Complex • Monroe, LA	Season suspended due to COVID-19 pandemic							
Mar. 17	Columbia		Allan Saxe Field • Arlington, TX	Season suspended due to COVID-19 pandemic							
Mar. 20	Appalachian State		Allan Saxe Field • Arlington, TX	Season suspended due to COVID-19 pandemic							
Mar. 21	Appalachian State		Allan Saxe Field • Arlington, TX	Season suspended due to COVID-19 pandemic							
Mar. 22	Appalachian State		Allan Saxe Field • Arlington, TX	Season suspended due to COVID-19 pandemic							
Mar. 25	at No. 2 Texas		Red and Charline McCombs Field • Austin, TX	Season suspended due to COVID-19 pandemic							
Mar. 27	at Georgia Southern		Eagle Field at GS Softball Complex • Statesboro, GA	Season suspended due to COVID-19 pandemic							
Mar. 28	at Georgia Southern		Eagle Field at GS Softball Complex • Statesboro, GA	Season suspended due to COVID-19 pandemic							
Mar. 29	at Georgia Southern		Eagle Field at GS Softball Complex • Statesboro, GA	Season suspended due to COVID-19 pandemic							

April (0–0)
Date	Opponent	Rank	Site/stadium	Score	Win	Loss	Save	TV	Attendance	Overall record	SBC record
Apr. 1	Sam Houston State		Allan Saxe Field • Arlington, TX	Season suspended due to COVID-19 pandemic							
Apr. 3	Coastal Carolina		Allan Saxe Field • Arlington, TX	Season suspended due to COVID-19 pandemic							
Apr. 4	Coastal Carolina		Allan Saxe Field • Arlington, TX	Season suspended due to COVID-19 pandemic							
Apr. 5	Coastal Carolina		Allan Saxe Field • Arlington, TX	Season suspended due to COVID-19 pandemic							
Apr. 7	Baylor		Allan Saxe Field • Arlington, TX	Season suspended due to COVID-19 pandemic							
Apr. 9	Georgia State		Allan Saxe Field • Arlington, TX	Season suspended due to COVID-19 pandemic							
Apr. 10	Georgia State		Allan Saxe Field • Arlington, TX	Season suspended due to COVID-19 pandemic							
Apr. 11	Georgia State		Allan Saxe Field • Arlington, TX	Season suspended due to COVID-19 pandemic							
Apr. 14	at Abilene Christian		Poly Wells Field • Abilene, TX	Season suspended due to COVID-19 pandemic							
Apr. 17	at South Alabama		Jaguar Field • Mobile, AL	Season suspended due to COVID-19 pandemic							
Apr. 18	at South Alabama		Jaguar Field • Mobile, AL	Season suspended due to COVID-19 pandemic							
Apr. 19	at South Alabama		Jaguar Field • Mobile, AL	Season suspended due to COVID-19 pandemic							
Apr. 22	Oklahoma		Allan Saxe Field • Arlington, TX	Season suspended due to COVID-19 pandemic							
Apr. 24	No. 8 Louisiana		Allan Saxe Field • Arlington, TX	Season suspended due to COVID-19 pandemic							
Apr. 25	No. 8 Louisiana		Allan Saxe Field • Arlington, TX	Season suspended due to COVID-19 pandemic							
Apr. 26	No. 8 Louisiana		Allan Saxe Field • Arlington, TX	Season suspended due to COVID-19 pandemic							
Apr. 30	at Texas State		Bobcat Softball Stadium • San Marcos, TX	Season suspended due to COVID-19 pandemic							

May (0-0)
Date	Opponent	Rank	Site/stadium	Score	Win	Loss	Save	TV	Attendance	Overall record	SBC record
May 1	at Texas State		Bobcat Softball Stadium • San Marcos, TX	Season suspended due to COVID-19 pandemic							
May 2	at Texas State		Bobcat Softball Stadium • San Marcos, TX	Season suspended due to COVID-19 pandemic							

Post-Season (0-0)

SBC tournament (0-0)
Date	Opponent	(Seed)/Rank	Site/stadium	Score	Win	Loss	Save	TV	Attendance	Overall record	SBC record
May 6	TBD		Robert E. Heck Softball Complex • Atlanta, GA	Championship Series canceled to COVID-19 pandemic							

Schedule source:

*Rankings are based on the team's current ranking in the NFCA/USA Softball poll.
