= 2020 Troy Trojans softball team =

American college softball season

2020 Troy Trojans softball
- Conference: Sun Belt Conference
- Record: 17–6 (1–2 SBC)
- Head coach: Beth Mullins (6th season)
- Assistant coaches: Taylor Smartt; Holly Ward
- Home stadium: Troy Softball Complex

2020 Sun Belt Conference softball standings
	Conf.				Overall
Team	W		L	PCT	W		L	PCT
No. 8 Louisiana ‍‍‍	2	–	1	.667	18	–	6	.750
Texas State ‍‍‍	2	–	1	.667	15	–	9	.625
Georgia Southern ‍‍‍	2	–	1	.667	14	–	10	.583
UT Arlington ‍‍‍	2	–	1	.667	12	–	13	.480
South Alabama ‍‍‍	2	–	1	.667	8	–	17	.320
Troy ‍‍‍	1	–	2	.333	16	–	6	.727
Coastal Carolina ‍‍‍	1	–	2	.333	13	–	8	.619
Appalachian State ‍‍‍	1	–	2	.333	13	–	9	.591
Louisiana–Monroe ‍‍‍	1	–	2	.333	10	–	14	.417
Georgia State ‍‍‍	1	–	2	.333	7	–	16	.304
† – Conference champion ‡ – Tournament champion y – Invited to the NCAA tournament As of March 13, 2020; Rankings from NFCA

The 2020 Troy Trojans softball team represented Troy University in the 2020 NCAA Division I softball season. The Trojans played their home games at Troy Softball Complex. The Trojans were led by sixth year head coach Beth Mullins and were members of the Sun Belt Conference.

On March 12, the Sun Belt Conference announced the indefinite suspension of all spring athletics, including softball, due to the increasing risk of the COVID-19 pandemic. On March 16, the Sun Belt formally announced the cancelation of all spring sports, thus ending their season definitely.

== Preseason ==
=== Sun Belt Conference Coaches Poll ===
The Sun Belt Conference Coaches Poll was released on January 29, 2020. Troy was picked to finish second in the Sun Belt Conference with 85 votes.

Coaches poll
Predicted finish	Team	Votes (1st place)
1	Louisiana	100 (10)
2	Troy	85
3	UT Arlington	77
4	Texas State	74
5	Coastal Carolina	56
6	Appalachian State	47
7	Georgia Southern	36
8	South Alabama	31
9	Louisiana-Monroe	26
10	Georgia State	18

=== Preseason All-Sun Belt team ===
- Summer Ellyson (LA, SR, Pitcher)
- Megan Kleist (LA, SR, Pitcher)
- Julie Rawls (LA, SR, Catcher)
- Reagan Wright (UTA, SR, Catcher)
- Katie Webb (TROY, SR, 1st Base)
- Kaitlyn Alderink (LA, SR, 2nd Base)
- Hailey Mackay (TXST, SR, 3rd Base)
- Alissa Dalton (LA, SR, Shortstop)
- Jayden Mount (ULM, SR, Shortstop)
- Whitney Walton (UTA, SR, Shortstop)
- Tara Oltmann (TXST, JR, Shortstop)
- Courtney Dean (CCU, JR, Outfield)
- Mekhia Freeman (GASO, SR, Outfield)
- Sarah Hudek (LA, SR, Outfield)
- Raina O'Neal (LA, JR, Outfield)
- Bailey Curry (LA, JR, Designated Player/1st Base)

=== National Softball Signing Day ===
Player	Position	Hometown	Previous Team
Tate Moseley	Outfielder	Trussville, Alabama	Auburn
Libby Baker	Pitcher	Skipperville, Alabama	G. W. Long HS
Candela Figeroa	Catcher/Outfielder	Entre Rios, Argentina	Chipola College
Ashlan Ard	Infielder	Franklinton, Louisiana	Franklinton HS
Kennedi Gaton	Infielder	Winter Springs, Florida	Winter Springs HS
Jill Robinson	Catcher	Mobile, Alabama	Baker HS
Audra Thompson	Infielder	Kissimmee, Florida	Osceola HS
Brianna Bailey	Pitcher	Wewahitchka, Florida	Chipola College

== Roster ==
2020 Troy Trojans roster
Pitchers: 3 Libby Baker - Freshman; 10 Leanna Johnson - Sophomore; 23 Kynsley Rae Blasingame - Junior; 26 Haley Postell - Redshirt Freshman; Outfielders: 1 Tate Moseley - Redshirt Freshman; 2 Anslee Finch - Freshman; 4 Grace Mirly - Senior; 9 Jade Sinness - Freshman; 25 Katie Lively - Sophomore; 44 Brooke Echols - Senior; 77 Katie Emmal - Junior	Catchers: 14 Candela Figueroa - Junior; 17 Katelynn De Leon - Freshman; 21 Hannah Williamson - Senior; Infielders: 5 Meagan Patterson - Freshman; 6 Kaylee Chapman - Sophomore; 18 Adia Polk - Sophomore; 22 Logan Calhoun - Redshirt Junior; 24 Katie Webb - Senior; 27 Mia Jenkins - Freshman; 31 Kelly Horne - Sophomore

=== Coaching staff ===
2020 Troy Trojans coaching staff
- Beth Mullins – Head Coach – 6th year
- Taylor Smartt – Assistant Head Coach – 5th year
- Holly Ward – Assistant Head Coach – 1st year
- Madeline Porter – Volunteer Assistant Coach – 1st year
- Kristy Lawrence – Director of Operations – 9th year

== Schedule and results ==
Legend
	Troy win
	Troy loss
	Postponement/Cancellation/Suspensions
**Bold**	Troy team member

2020 Troy Trojans softball game log
Regular season (17-6)

February (13-3)
Date	Opponent	Rank	Site/stadium	Score	Win	Loss	Save	TV	Attendance	Overall record	SBC record
Trojan Classic
Feb. 7	Lipscomb		Troy Softball Complex • Troy, AL	**W** 2-0	**Johnson** (1-0)	Yakubowski (0-1)	None		297	1-0	
Feb. 7	College of Charleston		Troy Softball Complex • Troy, AL	**W** 8-3	**Baker** (1-0)	Jenkins (0-1)	None		337	2-0	
Feb. 8	Western Kentucky		Troy Softball Complex • Troy, AL	**L** 2-3 (8 inn)	Aikey (1-1)	**Johnson** (1-1)	None		393	2-1	
Feb. 9	North Florida		Troy Softball Complex • Troy, AL	**W** 3-0	**Johnson** (2-1)	Clausen (1-1)	None		287	3-1	
Troy Invitational
Feb. 14	Kennesaw State		Troy Softball Complex • Troy, AL	**W** 9-2	**Johnson** (3-1)	Bennett (2-1)	None		143	4-1	
Feb. 14	Purdue Fort Wayne		Troy Softball Complex • Troy, AL	**W** 6-3	**Baker** (2-0)	Eyre (0-1)	**Johnson** (1)		87	5-1	
Feb. 15	Southeast Missouri State		Troy Softball Complex • Troy, AL	**L** 3-13	Anderson (2-0)	**Baker** (2-1)	None		97	5-2	
Feb. 15	Eastern Illinois		Troy Softball Complex • Troy, AL	**W** 3-0	**Johnson** (4-1)	Montgomery (1-1)	None		101	6-2	
Citrus Classic
Feb. 21	vs. Oakland		ESPN Wide World of Sports Complex • Orlando, FL	**W** 5-4	**Baker** (3-1)	Wiggins (1-1)	**Johnson** (2)		127	7-2	
Feb. 21	vs. Clemson		ESPN Wide World of Sports Complex • Orlando, FL	**L** 1-10	Cagle (3-5)	**Johnson** (4-2)	None		200	7-3	
Feb. 22	vs. Stetson		ESPN Wide World of Sports Complex • Orlando, FL	**W** 3-0	**Johnson** (5-2)	Temples (5-2)	None		147	8-3	
Feb. 22	vs. Morgan State		ESPN Wide World of Sports Complex • Orlando, FL	**W** 12-0	**Blasingame** (1-0)	Barnard (1-2)	None		174	9-3	
Feb. 23	vs. Villanova		ESPN Wide World of Sports Complex • Orlando, FL	**W** 5-1	**Johnson** (6-2)	Rauch (7-2)	None		300	10-3	
Feb. 26	McNeese State		Troy Softball Complex • Troy, AL	**W** 5-0	**Johnson** (7-2)	Flores (3-2)	None		127	11-3	
Black & Garnett Challenge
Feb. 29	vs. Charlotte		Beckham Field • Columbia, SC	**W** 10-0	**Johnson** (8-2)	Pace (3-4)	None		100	12-3	
Feb. 29	at No. 16 South Carolina		Beckham Field • Columbia, SC	**W** 2-1	**Blasingame** (2-0)	Ochs (3-1)	**Johnson** (1)		1,191	13-3	

March (4-3)
Date	Opponent	Rank	Site/stadium	Score	Win	Loss	Save	TV	Attendance	Overall record	SBC record
Mar. 1	vs. Charlotte		Beckham Field • Columbia, SC	**W** 8-0	**Blasingame** (3-0)	Wright (3-2)	None		100	14-3	
Mar. 1	at No. 16 South Carolina		Beckham Field • Columbia, SC	**L** 2-5	Betenbaugh (2-0)	**Blasingame** (3-1)	None		1,573	14-4	
Mar. 6	at UT Arlington		Allan Saxe Field • Arlington, TX	**W** 11-2	**Johnson** (9-2)	Hines (2-3)	None		344	15-4	1-0
Mar. 7	at UT Arlington		Allan Saxe Field • Arlington, TX	**L** 1-2	Phillips (2-4)	**Blasingame** (3-2)	None		386	15-5	1-1
Mar. 8	at UT Arlington		Allan Saxe Field • Arlington, TX	**L** 3-7	Valencia (4-6)	**Johnson** (9-3)	Gardiner (2)		378	15-6	1-2
Mar. 10	Florida A&M		Troy Softball Complex • Troy, AL	**W** 8-3	**Johnson** (10-3)	Zenteno (1-6)	None		117	16-6	
Mar. 11	at Samford		Samford Softball Field • Homewood, AL	**W** 1-0	**Johnson** (11-3)	Barnett (2-2)	None		113	17-6	
Mar. 13	Georgia Southern		Troy Softball Complex • Troy, AL	Season suspended due to COVID-19 pandemic							
Mar. 14	Georgia Southern		Troy Softball Complex • Troy, AL	Season suspended due to COVID-19 pandemic							
Mar. 15	Georgia Southern		Troy Softball Complex • Troy, AL	Season suspended due to COVID-19 pandemic							
Mar. 18	at No. 10 Alabama		Rhoads Stadium • Tuscaloosa, AL	Season suspended due to COVID-19 pandemic							
Mar. 20	at Louisiana–Monroe		Geo Surfaces Field at ULM Softball Complex • Monroe, LA	Season suspended due to COVID-19 pandemic							
Mar. 21	at Louisiana–Monroe		Geo Surfaces Field at the ULM Softball Complex • Monroe, LA	Season suspended due to COVID-19 pandemic							
Mar. 22	at Louisiana–Monroe		Geo Surfaces Field at the ULM Softball Complex • Monroe, LA	Season suspended due to COVID-19 pandemic							
Mar. 25	at Georgia Tech		Shirley Clements Mewborn Field • Atlanta, GA	Season suspended due to COVID-19 pandemic							
Mar. 27	Coastal Carolina		Troy Softball Complex • Troy, AL	Season suspended due to COVID-19 pandemic							
Mar. 28	Coastal Carolina		Troy Softball Complex • Troy, AL	Season suspended due to COVID-19 pandemic							
Mar. 29	Coastal Carolina		Troy Softball Complex • Troy, AL	Season suspended due to COVID-19 pandemic							

April (0–0)
Date	Opponent	Rank	Site/stadium	Score	Win	Loss	Save	TV	Attendance	Overall record	SBC record
Apr. 3	at Georgia State		Robert E. Heck Softball Complex • Atlanta, GA	Season suspended due to COVID-19 pandemic							
Apr. 4	at Georgia State		Robert E. Heck Softball Complex • Atlanta, GA	Season suspended due to COVID-19 pandemic							
Apr. 5	at Georgia State		Robert E. Heck Softball Complex • Atlanta, GA	Season suspended due to COVID-19 pandemic							
Apr. 9	No. 8 Louisiana		Troy Softball Complex • Troy, AL	Season suspended due to COVID-19 pandemic							
Apr. 10	No. 8 Louisiana		Troy Softball Complex • Troy, AL	Season suspended due to COVID-19 pandemic							
Apr. 11	No. 8 Louisiana		Troy Softball Complex • Troy, AL	Season suspended due to COVID-19 pandemic							
Apr. 14	South Alabama		Troy Softball Complex • Troy, AL	Season suspended due to COVID-19 pandemic							
Apr. 17	at Appalachian State		Sywassink/Lloyd Family Stadium • Boone, NC	Season suspended due to COVID-19 pandemic							
Apr. 18	at Appalachian State		Sywassink/Lloyd Family Stadium • Boone, NC	Season suspended due to COVID-19 pandemic							
Apr. 19	at Appalachian State		Sywassink/Lloyd Family Stadium • Boone, NC	Season suspended due to COVID-19 pandemic							
Apr. 22	Auburn		Troy Softball Complex • Troy, AL	Season suspended due to COVID-19 pandemic							
Apr. 24	Texas State		Troy Softball Complex • Troy, AL	Season suspended due to COVID-19 pandemic							
Apr. 25	Texas State		Troy Softball Complex • Troy, AL	Season suspended due to COVID-19 pandemic							
Apr. 26	Texas State		Troy Softball Complex • Troy, AL	Season suspended due to COVID-19 pandemic							

May (0-0)
Date	Opponent	Rank	Site/stadium	Score	Win	Loss	Save	TV	Attendance	Overall record	SBC record
May 1	at South Alabama		Jaguar Field • Mobile, AL	Season suspended due to COVID-19 pandemic							
May 2	at South Alabama		Jaguar Field • Mobile, AL	Season suspended due to COVID-19 pandemic							

Post-Season (0-0)

SBC tournament (0-0)
Date	Opponent	(Seed)/Rank	Site/stadium	Score	Win	Loss	Save	TV	Attendance	Overall record	SBC record
May 6	TBD		Robert E. Heck Softball Complex • Atlanta, GA	Championship Series canceled to COVID-19 pandemic							

Schedule source:

*Rankings are based on the team's current ranking in the NFCA/USA Softball poll.
