= 2020 Louisiana–Monroe Warhawks softball team =

American college softball season

2020 Louisiana–Monroe Warhawks softball
- Conference: Sun Belt Conference
- Record: 10–14 (1–2 SBC)
- Head coach: Molly Fichtner (2nd season)
- Assistant coaches: Jessica Thornton; Lea Wodach
- Home stadium: Geo-Surfaces Field at the ULM Softball Complex

2020 Sun Belt Conference softball standings
	Conf.				Overall
Team	W		L	PCT	W		L	PCT
No. 8 Louisiana ‍‍‍	2	–	1	.667	18	–	6	.750
Texas State ‍‍‍	2	–	1	.667	15	–	9	.625
Georgia Southern ‍‍‍	2	–	1	.667	14	–	10	.583
UT Arlington ‍‍‍	2	–	1	.667	12	–	13	.480
South Alabama ‍‍‍	2	–	1	.667	8	–	17	.320
Troy ‍‍‍	1	–	2	.333	16	–	6	.727
Coastal Carolina ‍‍‍	1	–	2	.333	13	–	8	.619
Appalachian State ‍‍‍	1	–	2	.333	13	–	9	.591
Louisiana–Monroe ‍‍‍	1	–	2	.333	10	–	14	.417
Georgia State ‍‍‍	1	–	2	.333	7	–	16	.304
† – Conference champion ‡ – Tournament champion y – Invited to the NCAA tournament As of March 13, 2020; Rankings from NFCA

The 2020 Louisiana–Monroe Warhawks softball team represented the University of Louisiana at Monroe in the 2020 NCAA Division I softball season. The Warhawks played their home games at Geo-Surfaces Field at the ULM Softball Complex. The Warhawks were led by second year head coach Molly Fichtner and were members of the Sun Belt Conference.

On March 12, the Sun Belt Conference announced the indefinite suspension of all spring athletics, including softball, due to the increasing risk of the COVID-19 pandemic. On March 16, the Sun Belt formally announced the cancelation of all spring sports, thus ending their season definitely.

== Preseason ==
=== Sun Belt Conference Coaches Poll ===
The Sun Belt Conference Coaches Poll was released on January 29, 2020. Louisiana–Monroe was picked to finish ninth in the Sun Belt Conference with 26 votes.

Coaches poll
Predicted finish	Team	Votes (1st place)
1	Louisiana	100 (10)
2	Troy	85
3	UT Arlington	77
4	Texas State	74
5	Coastal Carolina	56
6	Appalachian State	47
7	Georgia Southern	36
8	South Alabama	31
9	Louisiana-Monroe	26
10	Georgia State	18

=== Preseason All-Sun Belt team ===
- Summer Ellyson (LA, SR, Pitcher)
- Megan Kleist (LA, SR, Pitcher)
- Julie Rawls (LA, SR, Catcher)
- Reagan Wright (UTA, SR, Catcher)
- Katie Webb (TROY, SR, 1st Base)
- Kaitlyn Alderink (LA, SR, 2nd Base)
- Hailey Mackay (TXST, SR, 3rd Base)
- Alissa Dalton (LA, SR, Shortstop)
- Jayden Mount (ULM, SR, Shortstop)
- Whitney Walton (UTA, SR, Shortstop)
- Tara Oltmann (TXST, JR, Shortstop)
- Courtney Dean (CCU, JR, Outfield)
- Mekhia Freeman (GASO, SR, Outfield)
- Sarah Hudek (LA, SR, Outfield)
- Raina O'Neal (LA, JR, Outfield)
- Bailey Curry (LA, JR, Designated Player/1st Base)

=== National Softball Signing Day ===
Player	Position	Hometown	Previous Team
Gianni Hulett	Pitcher	Bryant, Arkansas	Bryant HS
Caley McGuff	Outfielder	Spring, Texas	Klein Collins HS
Lauren Blankenship	Outfielder	Ardmore, Oklahoma	Ardmore HS
Madelyn Fletcher	Infielder	Monroe, Louisiana	Ouachita Parish HS
Andie Edwards	Infielder	Lake Charles, Louisiana	Sam Houston HS
Madison Blount	Catcher/Utility	La Vernia, Texas	La Vernia HS

== Roster ==
2020 Louisiana–Monroe Warhawks roster
Pitchers: 1 Kassidy Giddens - Freshman; 13 Karly Taranto - Sophomore; 14 Amber Coons - Junior; 24 Murphy Williams - Sophomore; 25 Adrianna Chavarria - Sophomore; Outfielders: 9 Charlie Names - Junior; 20 Alysia Anderson - Junior; 26 Korie Kreps - Sophomore	Catchers: 10 Kelsey Giddens - Freshman; 21 Jessica Williams - Sophomore; 23 Kendall Morton - Freshman; Infielders: 5 Jayden Mount - Senior; 19 Jacelyn Buck - Freshman; 22 Ana Hogan - Senior; 44 Jessie Watts - Senior; Utility: 2 Kennedy Page - Sophomore; 12 Rylee Lara - Junior; 15 Kennedy Johnson - Sophomore

=== Coaching staff ===
2020 Louisiana–Monroe Warhawks coaching staff
- Molly Fichtner – Head Coach – 2nd year
- Jessica Thornton – Assistant Head Coach – 5th year
- Lea Wodach – Assistant Head Coach – 1st year

== Schedule and results ==
Legend
	Louisiana–Monroe win
	Louisiana–Monroe loss
	Postponement/Cancellation/Suspensions
**Bold**	Louisiana–Monroe team member

2020 Louisiana–Monroe Warhawks softball game log
Regular season (10-14)

February (9-10)
Date	Opponent	Rank	Site/stadium	Score	Win	Loss	Save	TV	Attendance	Overall record	SBC record
ULM Tournament
Feb. 7	Stephen F. Austin		Geo-Surfaces Field at the ULM Softball Complex • Monroe, LA	**L** 2-8	Wilbur (1-0)	**Giddens** (0-1)	None		401	0-1	
Feb. 7	Southern		Geo-Surfaces Field at the ULM Softball Complex • Monroe, LA	**W** 9-1	**Coons** (1-0)	Donaldson (0-1)	None		401	1-1	
Feb. 8	Southern		Geo-Surfaces Field at the ULM Softball Complex • Monroe, LA	**W** 5-0	**Williams** (1-0)	Donaldson (0-2)	None		362	2-1	
Feb. 8	Stephen F. Austin		Geo-Surfaces Field at the ULM Softball Complex • Monroe, LA	**L** 0-12	Kriesel (2-0)	**Taranto** (0-1)	None			2-2	
Feb. 11	at Louisiana Tech		Lady Techsters Softball Complex • Ruston, LA	Game Cancelled							
Feb. 11	Grambling State		Geo-Surfaces Field at the ULM Softball Complex • Monroe, LA	Game Cancelled							
ScrapYard Tournament
Feb. 14	vs. South Dakota State		Scrapyard Softball Complex • Conroe, TX	**L** 5-8	Conard (1-2)	**Watts** (0-1)	None			2-3	
Feb. 14	vs. Texas A&M-Corpus Christi		Scrapyard Softball Complex • Conroe, TX	**W** 6-4	**Coons** (0-2)	Hoyt (0-2)	None			3-3	
Feb. 15	vs. Texas A&M-Corpus Christi		Scrapyard Softball Complex • Conroe, TX	**L** 1-5	Lombrana (2-2)	**Williams** (1-1)	None		100	3-4	
Feb. 15	vs. UAB		Scrapyard Softball Complex • Conroe, TX	**L** 0-7	Cook (2-0)	**Giddens** (0-2)	None		150	3-5	
Feb. 16	vs. South Dakota State		Scrapyard Softball Complex • Conroe, TX	**L** 1-6	Glanzer (3-2)	**Coons** (1-2)	None		100	3-6	
Feb. 19	at McNeese State		Joe Miller Field at Cowgirl Diamond • Lake Charles, LA	**L** 1-3	Tate (2-0)	**Giddens** (0-3)	None		327	3-7	
Mardi Gras Mambo
Feb. 21	vs. Houston Baptist		Youngsville Sports Complex • Youngsville, LA	**W** 10-4	**Giddens** (1-3)	Patak (2-1)	None			4-7	
Feb. 22	vs. Abilene Christian		Youngsville Sports Complex • Youngsville, LA	**W** 8-0	**Williams** (2-1)	Sinnott (2-4)	None			5-7	
Feb. 22	vs. Incarnate Word		Youngsville Sports Complex • Youngsville, LA	**W** 8-0	**Coons** (3-1)	Gunther (1-4)	None			6-7	
Feb. 23	vs. Nicholls		Youngsville Sports Complex • Youngsville, LA	**W** 6-1	**Williams** (3-1)	Danehower (4-4)	None		106	7-7	
Feb. 23	vs. Southeastern Louisiana		Youngsville Sports Complex • Youngsville, LA	**L** 1-3	Zumo (2-1)	**Giddens** (1-4)	Comeaux (1)			7-8	
Feb. 26	Louisiana Tech		Geo-Surfaces Field at the ULM Softball Complex • Monroe, LA	**W** 12-4	**Coons** (4-1)	Pickett (1-6)	None		395	8-8	
Adam Brown Memorial Shamrock Classic
Feb. 28	vs. Belmont		Farris Field • Conway, AR	**L** 5-6	Kennett (2-3)	**Watts** (0-2)	None		101	8-9	
Feb. 28	vs. Stephen F. Austin		Farris Field • Conway, AR	**L** 2-11	Wilbur (4-2)	**Williams** (3-2)	None		114	8-10	
Feb. 29	at Central Arkansas		Farris Field • Conway, AR	**W** 8-5	**Williams** (4-1)	Sanchez (1-4)	None		286	9-10	

March (1-4)
Date	Opponent	Rank	Site/stadium	Score	Win	Loss	Save	TV	Attendance	Overall record	SBC record
Mar. 1	vs. Northern Iowa		Farris Field • Conway, AR	**L** 4-8	Heyer (3-5)	**Giddens** (1-6)	None		86	9-11	
Mar. 6	at Georgia Southern		Eagle Field at GS Softball Complex • Statesboro, GA	**L** 6-9	Richardson (3-0)	**Coons** (4-2)	None		127	9-12	0-1
Mar. 7	at Georgia Southern		Eagle Field at GS Softball Complex • Statesboro, GA	**L** 3-4	Waldrep (5-4)	**Chavarria** (0-1)	None		182	9-13	0-2
Mar. 8	at Georgia Southern		Eagle Field at GS Softball Complex • Statesboro, GA	**W** 6-3	**Williams** (5-2)	Barfield (0-1)	**Watts** (1)		217	10-13	1-2
Mar. 11	McNeese State		Geo-Surfaces Field at the ULM Softball Complex • Monroe, LA	**L** 3-6	Tate (3-2)	**Chavarria** (0-2)	None		271	10-14	
Mar. 13	UT Arlington		Geo-Surfaces Field at the ULM Softball Complex • Monroe, LA	Season suspended due to COVID-19 pandemic							
Mar. 14	UT Arlington		Geo-Surfaces Field at the ULM Softball Complex • Monroe, LA	Season suspended due to COVID-19 pandemic							
Mar. 15	UT Arlington		Geo-Surfaces Field at the ULM Softball Complex • Monroe, LA	Season suspended due to COVID-19 pandemic							
Mar. 17	at Ole Miss		Ole Miss Softball Complex • Oxford, MS	Season suspended due to COVID-19 pandemic							
Mar. 18	Southern Miss		Geo-Surfaces Field at the ULM Softball Complex • Monroe, LA	Season suspended due to COVID-19 pandemic							
Mar. 20	Troy		Geo-Surfaces Field at the ULM Softball Complex • Monroe, LA	Season suspended due to COVID-19 pandemic							
Mar. 21	Troy		Geo-Surfaces Field at the ULM Softball Complex • Monroe, LA	Season suspended due to COVID-19 pandemic							
Mar. 22	Troy		Geo-Surfaces Field at the ULM Softball Complex • Monroe, LA	Season suspended due to COVID-19 pandemic							
Mar. 24	at Grambling State		GSU Softball Complex • Grambling, LA	Season suspended due to COVID-19 pandemic							
Mar. 27	at South Alabama		Jaguar Field • Mobile, AL	Season suspended due to COVID-19 pandemic							
Mar. 28	at South Alabama		Jaguar Field • Mobile, AL	Season suspended due to COVID-19 pandemic							
Mar. 29	at South Alabama		Jaguar Field • Mobile, AL	Season suspended due to COVID-19 pandemic							
Mar. 31	Southeastern Louisiana		Geo-Surfaces Field at the ULM Softball Complex • Monroe, LA	Season suspended due to COVID-19 pandemic							

April (0–0)
Date	Opponent	Rank	Site/stadium	Score	Win	Loss	Save	TV	Attendance	Overall record	SBC record
Apr. 1	at No. 5 LSU		Tiger Park • Baton Rouge, LA	Season suspended due to COVID-19 pandemic							
Apr. 3	at Appalachian State		Sywassink/Lloyd Family Stadium • Boone, NC	Season suspended due to COVID-19 pandemic							
Apr. 4	at Appalachian State		Sywassink/Lloyd Family Stadium • Boone, NC	Season suspended due to COVID-19 pandemic							
Apr. 5	at Appalachian State		Sywassink/Lloyd Family Stadium • Boone, NC	Season suspended due to COVID-19 pandemic							
Apr. 7	at Central Arkansas		Farris Field • Conway, AR	Season suspended due to COVID-19 pandemic							
Apr. 9	Coastal Carolina		Geo-Surfaces Field at the ULM Softball Complex • Monroe, LA	Season suspended due to COVID-19 pandemic							
Apr. 10	Coastal Carolina		Geo-Surfaces Field at the ULM Softball Complex • Monroe, LA	Season suspended due to COVID-19 pandemic							
Apr. 11	Coastal Carolina		Geo-Surfaces Field at the ULM Softball Complex • Monroe, LA	Season suspended due to COVID-19 pandemic							
Apr. 17	at Texas		Bobcat Softball Stadium • San Marcos, TX	Season suspended due to COVID-19 pandemic							
Apr. 18	at Texas State		Bobcat Softball Stadium • San Marcos, TX	Season suspended due to COVID-19 pandemic							
Apr. 19	at Texas State		Bobcat Softball Stadium • San Marcos, TX	Season suspended due to COVID-19 pandemic							
Apr. 24	Georgia State		Geo-Surfaces Field at the ULM Softball Complex • Monroe, LA	Season suspended due to COVID-19 pandemic							
Apr. 25	Georgia State		Geo-Surfaces Field at the ULM Softball Complex • Monroe, LA	Season suspended due to COVID-19 pandemic							
Apr. 26	Georgia State		Geo-Surfaces Field at the ULM Softball Complex • Monroe, LA	Season suspended due to COVID-19 pandemic							
Apr. 30	at No. 8 Louisiana		Yvette Girouard Field at Lamson Park • Lafayette, LA	Season suspended due to COVID-19 pandemic							

May (0-0)
Date	Opponent	Rank	Site/stadium	Score	Win	Loss	Save	TV	Attendance	Overall record	SBC record
May 1	at No. 8 Louisiana		Yvette Girouard Field at Lamson Park • Lafayette, LA	Season suspended due to COVID-19 pandemic							
May 2	at No. 8 Louisiana		Yvette Girouard Field at Lamson Park • Lafayette, LA	Season suspended due to COVID-19 pandemic							

Post-Season (0-0)

SBC tournament (0-0)
Date	Opponent	(Seed)/Rank	Site/stadium	Score	Win	Loss	Save	TV	Attendance	Overall record	SBC record
May 6	TBD		Robert E. Heck Softball Complex • Atlanta, GA	Championship Series canceled to COVID-19 pandemic							

Schedule source:

*Rankings are based on the team's current ranking in the NFCA/USA Softball poll.
