= 2020 South Alabama Jaguars softball team =

American college softball season

2020 South Alabama Jaguars softball
- Conference: Sun Belt Conference
- Record: 8–17 (2–1 SBC)
- Head coach: Becky Clark (14th season)
- Assistant coaches: Kristina McCain; Hannah Campbell
- Home stadium: Jaguar Field

2020 Sun Belt Conference softball standings
	Conf.				Overall
Team	W		L	PCT	W		L	PCT
No. 8 Louisiana ‍‍‍	2	–	1	.667	18	–	6	.750
Texas State ‍‍‍	2	–	1	.667	15	–	9	.625
Georgia Southern ‍‍‍	2	–	1	.667	14	–	10	.583
UT Arlington ‍‍‍	2	–	1	.667	12	–	13	.480
South Alabama ‍‍‍	2	–	1	.667	8	–	17	.320
Troy ‍‍‍	1	–	2	.333	16	–	6	.727
Coastal Carolina ‍‍‍	1	–	2	.333	13	–	8	.619
Appalachian State ‍‍‍	1	–	2	.333	13	–	9	.591
Louisiana–Monroe ‍‍‍	1	–	2	.333	10	–	14	.417
Georgia State ‍‍‍	1	–	2	.333	7	–	16	.304
† – Conference champion ‡ – Tournament champion y – Invited to the NCAA tournament As of March 13, 2020; Rankings from NFCA

The 2020 South Alabama Jaguars softball team represented the University of South Alabama in the 2020 NCAA Division I softball season. The Jaguars played their home games at Jaguar Field. The Jaguars were led by fourteenth year head coach Becky Clark and were members of the Sun Belt Conference.

On March 12, the Sun Belt Conference announced the indefinite suspension of all spring athletics, including softball, due to the increasing risk of the COVID-19 pandemic. On March 16, the Sun Belt formally announced the cancelation of all spring sports, thus ending their season definitely.

== Preseason ==
=== Sun Belt Conference Coaches Poll ===
The Sun Belt Conference Coaches Poll was released on January 29, 2020. South Alabama was picked to finish eighth in the Sun Belt Conference with 31 votes.

Coaches poll
Predicted finish	Team	Votes (1st place)
1	Louisiana	100 (10)
2	Troy	85
3	UT Arlington	77
4	Texas State	74
5	Coastal Carolina	56
6	Appalachian State	47
7	Georgia Southern	36
8	South Alabama	31
9	Louisiana-Monroe	26
10	Georgia State	18

=== Preseason All-Sun Belt team ===
- Summer Ellyson (LA, SR, Pitcher)
- Megan Kleist (LA, SR, Pitcher)
- Julie Rawls (LA, SR, Catcher)
- Reagan Wright (UTA, SR, Catcher)
- Katie Webb (TROY, SR, 1st Base)
- Kaitlyn Alderink (LA, SR, 2nd Base)
- Hailey Mackay (TXST, SR, 3rd Base)
- Alissa Dalton (LA, SR, Shortstop)
- Jayden Mount (ULM, SR, Shortstop)
- Whitney Walton (UTA, SR, Shortstop)
- Tara Oltmann (TXST, JR, Shortstop)
- Courtney Dean (CCU, JR, Outfield)
- Mekhia Freeman (GASO, SR, Outfield)
- Sarah Hudek (LA, SR, Outfield)
- Raina O'Neal (LA, JR, Outfield)
- Bailey Curry (LA, JR, Designated Player/1st Base)

=== National Softball Signing Day ===
Player	Position	Hometown	Previous Team
Mackenzie Brasher	Outfielder	Orange Beach, Alabama	Gulf Shores HS
Olivia Lackie	Pitcher	Walker, Louisiana	Holden HS
Abby Allen	Catcher/Utility	Monroe, Louisiana	Ouachita Parish HS
Bailey Welch	Outfielder	Hueytown, Alabama	Bessemer Academy
Anah "Kaitlyn" Hughes	Pitcher	Trussville, Alabama	Hewitt-Trussville HS
Bella Farmer	Infielder	Wetumpka, Alabama	Holtville HS
Allie Hughen	Pitcher/Infielder	Vista, California	Palomar College
Kelsie Rivers	Pitcher	Tallahassee, Florida	College of Central Florida

== Roster ==
2020 South Alabama Jaguars roster
Pitchers: 1 Kelsie Rivers - Sophomore'; 4 Allie Hughen - Junior; 16 Lexi Hutchins - Freshman; 33 Jamie Finnical - Junior; 35 Jenna Hardy - Freshman; Outfielders: 2 MC Nichols - Senior; 12 Shelby Sloan - Freshman; 18 Mackenzie Brasher - Freshman; 24 Amanda Flynn - Junior; 34 Victoria Ortiz - Sophomore	Catchers: 3 Emma Kropp - Freshman; 10 Kassidy Wilcox - Freshman; 11 Kamdyn Kvistad - Junior; Infielders: 5 Camryn McLemore - Freshman; 7 Caroline Nichols - Sophomore; 9 Jordyn Calderon - Sophomore; 17 Abby Krzywiecki - Senior; 19 Kennedy Cronan - Sophomore; 20 Holly Stewart - Sophomore; 22 Breanna Barlow - Freshman; 30 Katelyn Gruich - Senior

=== Coaching staff ===
2020 South Alabama Jaguars coaching staff
- Becky Clark – Head Coach – 14th year
- Kristina McCain – Assistant Head Coach – 10th year
- Hannah Campbell – Assistant Head Coach – 5th year
- Taryn Gray – Volunteer Assistant Coach – 5th year
- Meredith Tanner – Director of Softball Operations – 9th year

== Schedule and results ==
Legend
	South Alabama win
	South Alabama loss
	Postponement/Cancellation/Suspensions
**Bold**	South Alabama team member

2020 South Alabama Jaguars softball game log
Regular season (8-17)

February (5-15)
Date	Opponent	Rank	Site/stadium	Score	Win	Loss	Save	TV	Attendance	Overall record	SBC record
NFCA Leadoff Classic
Feb. 7	vs. Texas State		Eddie C. Moore Complex • Clearwater, FL	**L** 2-5	King (1-0)	**Rivers** (0-1)	None		1,463	0-1	
Feb. 7	vs. Missouri		Eddie C. Moore Complex • Clearwater, FL	**L** 5-7	Dandola (1-0)	**Hughen** (0-1)	Daniel (1)		1,463	0-2	
Feb. 8	vs. Minnesota		Eddie C. Moore Complex • Clearwater, FL	**L** 0-10	Fiser (2-1)	**Hardy** (0-1)	None		2,114	0-3	
Feb. 8	vs. Illinois		Eddie C. Moore Complex • Clearwater, FL	**L** 4-5	Murray (1-0)	**Hughen'** (0-2)	Sickels (2)		2,114	0-4	
Feb. 9	vs. Notre Dame		Eddie C. Moore Complex • Clearwater, FL	**L** 1-3	Ryan (1-0)	**Hardy** (0-2)	Holloway (1)		1,370	0-5	
Feb. 11	Southern		Jaguar Field • Mobile, AL	**W** 6-2	**Hardy** (1-2)	May (0-1)	None		383	1-5	
Jaguar Challenge
Feb. 14	Austin Peay		Jaguar Field • Mobile, AL	**W** 8-2	**Hardy** (2-2)	Harpe (1-1)	None		351	2-5	
Feb. 15	Austin Peay		Jaguar Field • Mobile, AL	**W** 9-8	**Hutchins** (1-0)	Harpe (2-2)	None		383	3-5	
Feb. 15	Evansville		Jaguar Field • Mobile, AL	**W** 7-6	**Hutchins** (2-0)	Lockhart (3-1)	None		383	4-5	
Feb. 16	Evansville		Jaguar Field • Mobile, AL	**W** 7-6	Game Cancelled						
Feb. 18	at McNeese State		Joe Miller Field at Cowgirl Diamond • Lake Charles, LA	**L** 2-6	Flores (3-1)	**Hutchins** (2-1)	None		347	4-6	
Mardi Gras Classic
Feb. 21	Jacksonville		Jaguar Field • Mobile, AL	**L** 1-6	Bilodeau (5-2)	**Hardy** (2-3)	None		325	4-7	
Feb. 21	Memphis		Jaguar Field • Mobile, AL	**L** 3-6	Nichols (1-3)	**Hughen** (0-3)	Ellett (1)		325	4-8	
Feb. 22	Stephen F. Austin		Jaguar Field • Mobile, AL	**L** 4-7	Wilbur (3-2)	**Hardy** (2-4)	None		447	4-9	
Feb. 22	Memphis		Jaguar Field • Mobile, AL	**L** 4-7	Perque (1-2)	**Hutchins** (2-1)	Nichols (3)		447	4-10	
Feb. 23	Stephen F. Austin		Jaguar Field • Mobile, AL	**L** 0-9	Kriesel (6-1)	**Hutchins** (2-3)	None		348	4-11	
Feb. 25	at Nicholls		Swanner Field at Geo Surfaces Park • Thibodaux, LA	**L** 3-4 (16 inn)	Moon (2-2)	**Hardy** (2-5)	None		202	4-12	
The Spring Games
Feb. 28	vs. Seton Hall		R. O. C. Park • Madiera Beach, FL	**L** 7-9	Gumm (2-2)	**Hutchins** (2-4)	Smith (1)		89	4-13	
Feb. 28	vs. Middle Tennessee		R. O. C. Park • Madiera Beach, FL	**L** 0-3	Baldwin (4-2)	**Hughen** (0-4)	None		69	4-14	
Feb. 29	vs. Iowa		R. O. C. Park • Madiera Beach, FL	**W** 3-2	**Hutchins** (3-4)	Doocy (6-2)	None		89	5-14	
Feb. 29	vs. Miami (OH)		R. O. C. Park • Madiera Beach, FL	**L** 2-3	Rathe (1-1)	**Hughen** (0-5)	Vierstra (2)		114	5-15	

March (3-2)
Date	Opponent	Rank	Site/stadium	Score	Win	Loss	Save	TV	Attendance	Overall record	SBC record
Mar. 1	vs. Florida Atlantic		R. O. C. Park • Madiera Beach, FL	**W** 3-2	**Hughen** (1-5)	Gardner (2-4)	None		75	6-15	
Mar. 6	Appalachian State		Jaguar Field • Mobile, AL	**W** 10-6	**Hutchins** (4-4)	Nichols (1-1)	None		340	7-15	1-0
Mar. 7	Appalachian State		Jaguar Field • Mobile, AL	**W** 13-9	**Hutchins** (5-4)	Siemer (0-1)	None		409	8-15	2-0
Mar. 8	Appalachian State		Jaguar Field • Mobile, AL	**L** 2-5	Longanecker (4-5)	**Hardy** (2-6)	None		440	8-16	2-1
Mar. 10	at No. 7 LSU		Tiger Park • Baton Rouge, LA	**L** 1-11 (5 inn)	Kilponen (6-1)	**Hardy** (2-7)	None		1,362	8-17	
Mar. 13	Georgia State		Jaguar Field • Mobile, AL	Season suspended due to COVID-19 pandemic							
Mar. 14	Georgia State		Jaguar Field • Mobile, AL	Season suspended due to COVID-19 pandemic							
Mar. 15	Georgia State		Jaguar Field • Mobile, AL	Season suspended due to COVID-19 pandemic							
Mar. 17	Nicholls		Jaguar Field • Mobile, AL	Season suspended due to COVID-19 pandemic							
Mar. 20	at Texas State		Bobcat Softball Stadium • San Marcos, TX	Season suspended due to COVID-19 pandemic							
Mar. 21	at Texas State		Bobcat Softball Stadium • San Marcos, TX	Season suspended due to COVID-19 pandemic							
Mar. 22	at Texas State		Bobcat Softball Stadium • San Marcos, TX	Season suspended due to COVID-19 pandemic							
Mar. 24	at Southern Miss		Southern Miss Softball Complex • Hattiesburg, MS	Season suspended due to COVID-19 pandemic							
Mar. 27	Louisiana–Monroe		Jaguar Field • Mobile, AL	Season suspended due to COVID-19 pandemic							
Mar. 28	Louisiana–Monroe		Jaguar Field • Mobile, AL	Season suspended due to COVID-19 pandemic							
Mar. 29	Louisiana–Monroe		Jaguar Field • Mobile, AL	Season suspended due to COVID-19 pandemic							

April (0–0)
Date	Opponent	Rank	Site/stadium	Score	Win	Loss	Save	TV	Attendance	Overall record	SBC record
Apr. 3	at No. 8 Louisiana		Yvette Girouard Field at Lamson Park • Lafayette, LA	Season suspended due to COVID-19 pandemic							
Apr. 4	at No. 8 Louisiana		Yvette Girouard Field at Lamson Park • Lafayette, LA	Season suspended due to COVID-19 pandemic							
Apr. 5	at No. 8 Louisiana		Yvette Girouard Field at Lamson Park • Lafayette, LA	Season suspended due to COVID-19 pandemic							
Apr. 9	at Georgia Southern		Eagle Field at GS Softball Complex • Statesboro, GA	Season suspended due to COVID-19 pandemic							
Apr. 10	at Georgia Southern		Eagle Field at GS Softball Complex • Statesboro, GA	Season suspended due to COVID-19 pandemic							
Apr. 11	at Georgia Southern		Eagle Field at GS Softball Complex • Statesboro, GA	Season suspended due to COVID-19 pandemic							
Apr. 14	at Troy		Troy Softball Complex • Troy, AL	Season suspended due to COVID-19 pandemic							
Apr. 17	UT Arlington		Jaguar Field • Mobile, AL	Season suspended due to COVID-19 pandemic							
Apr. 18	UT Arlington		Jaguar Field • Mobile, AL	Season suspended due to COVID-19 pandemic							
Apr. 19	UT Arlington		Jaguar Field • Mobile, AL	Season suspended due to COVID-19 pandemic							
Apr. 22	Southern Miss		Jaguar Field • Mobile, AL	Season suspended due to COVID-19 pandemic							
Apr. 24	at Coastal Carolina		St. John Stadium–Charles Wade-John Lott Field • Conway, AR	Season suspended due to COVID-19 pandemic							
Apr. 25	at Coastal Carolina		St. John Stadium–Charles Wade-John Lott Field • Conway, SC	Season suspended due to COVID-19 pandemic							
Apr. 26	at Coastal Carolina		St. John Stadium–Charles Wade-John Lott Field • Conway, SC	Season suspended due to COVID-19 pandemic							

May (0-0)
Date	Opponent	Rank	Site/stadium	Score	Win	Loss	Save	TV	Attendance	Overall record	SBC record
May 1	Troy		Jaguar Field • Mobile, AL	Season suspended due to COVID-19 pandemic							
May 2	Troy		Jaguar Field • Mobile, AL	Season suspended due to COVID-19 pandemic							

Post-Season (0-0)

SBC tournament (0-0)
Date	Opponent	(Seed)/Rank	Site/stadium	Score	Win	Loss	Save	TV	Attendance	Overall record	SBC record
May 6	TBD		Robert E. Heck Softball Complex • Atlanta, GA	Championship Series canceled to COVID-19 pandemic							

Schedule source:

*Rankings are based on the team's current ranking in the NFCA/USA Softball poll.
