= 2020 Georgia Southern Eagles softball team =

American college softball season

2020 Georgia Southern Eagles softball
- Conference: Sun Belt Conference
- Record: 14–10 (2–1 SBC)
- Head coach: Kim Dean (3rd season)
- Assistant coaches: Brock Van Faussien; Dani Price
- Home stadium: Eagle Field at GS Softball Complex

2020 Sun Belt Conference softball standings
	Conf.				Overall
Team	W		L	PCT	W		L	PCT
No. 8 Louisiana ‍‍‍	2	–	1	.667	18	–	6	.750
Texas State ‍‍‍	2	–	1	.667	15	–	9	.625
Georgia Southern ‍‍‍	2	–	1	.667	14	–	10	.583
UT Arlington ‍‍‍	2	–	1	.667	12	–	13	.480
South Alabama ‍‍‍	2	–	1	.667	8	–	17	.320
Troy ‍‍‍	1	–	2	.333	16	–	6	.727
Coastal Carolina ‍‍‍	1	–	2	.333	13	–	8	.619
Appalachian State ‍‍‍	1	–	2	.333	13	–	9	.591
Louisiana–Monroe ‍‍‍	1	–	2	.333	10	–	14	.417
Georgia State ‍‍‍	1	–	2	.333	7	–	16	.304
† – Conference champion ‡ – Tournament champion y – Invited to the NCAA tournament As of March 13, 2020; Rankings from NFCA

The 2020 Georgia Southern Eagles softball team represented Georgia Southern University during the 2020 NCAA Division I softball season. The Eagles played their home games at Eagle Field at GS Softball Complex. The Eagles were led by third year head coach Kim Dean.

On March 12, the Sun Belt Conference announced the indefinite suspension of all spring athletics, including softball, due to the increasing risk of the COVID-19 pandemic. On March 16, the Sun Belt formally announced the cancelation of all spring sports, thus ending their season definitely.

== Preseason ==
=== Sun Belt Conference Coaches Poll ===
The Sun Belt Conference Coaches Poll was released on January 29, 2020. Georgia Southern was picked to finish seventh in the Sun Belt Conference with 36 votes.

Coaches poll
Predicted finish	Team	Votes (1st place)
1	Louisiana	100 (10)
2	Troy	85
3	UT Arlington	77
4	Texas State	74
5	Coastal Carolina	56
6	Appalachian State	47
7	Georgia Southern	36
8	South Alabama	31
9	Louisiana-Monroe	26
10	Georgia State	18

=== Preseason All-Sun Belt team ===
- Summer Ellyson (LA, SR, Pitcher)
- Megan Kleist (LA, SR, Pitcher)
- Julie Rawls (LA, SR, Catcher)
- Reagan Wright (UTA, SR, Catcher)
- Katie Webb (TROY, SR, 1st Base)
- Kaitlyn Alderink (LA, SR, 2nd Base)
- Hailey Mackay (TXST, SR, 3rd Base)
- Alissa Dalton (LA, SR, Shortstop)
- Jayden Mount (ULM, SR, Shortstop)
- Whitney Walton (UTA, SR, Shortstop)
- Tara Oltmann (TXST, JR, Shortstop)
- Courtney Dean (CCU, JR, Outfield)
- Mekhia Freeman (GASO, SR, Outfield)
- Sarah Hudek (LA, SR, Outfield)
- Raina O'Neal (LA, JR, Outfield)
- Bailey Curry (LA, JR, Designated Player/1st Base)

=== National Softball Signing Day ===
Player	Position	Hometown	Previous Team
Madi Campbell	Outfielder/Infielder	Warner Robins, Georgia	Houston County HS
JJ Darley	Infielder	Byron, Georgia	Tattnall Square Academy
Anna Feil	Pitcher	Pickerington, Ohio	Pickerington Central HS
Sydney Harris	Outfielder	Dacula, Georgia	Hebron Christian Academy
Aniston Johnson	Infielder	Alma, Georgia	Bacon County HS
Dejah Mills	Outfielder	Powder Springs, Georgia	Hillgrove HS

== Roster ==
2020 Georgia Southern Eagles roster
Pitchers: 4 Jess Mazur - Sophomore; 12 Rylee Waldrep - Junior; 19 Harlee Rewis - Junior; 23 Ashleigh Morton - Sophomore; 31 Kyleigh Richardson - Freshman; 77 Aaliyah Garcia - Freshman; Outfielders: 3 Ellington Day - Senior; 6 Mekhia Freeman - Senior; 10 Alisha House - Freshman; 15 Ashleigh Duty - Freshman; 25 Mary Grace Howard - Sophomore	Catchers: 14 Linzie Lafavor - Freshman; 16 Sydney Horton - Senior; 20 Janai Conklin - Freshman; 91 Allyssah Mullis - Junior; Infielders: 1 Shayla Smith - Senior; 2 Shelby Barfield - Sophomore; 5 Olivia Creamer - Freshman; 7 Bailee Wilson - Freshman; 22 Ashlynn Gunter - Sophomore; 24 Alia Booth - Senior; 43 Faith Shirley - Sophomore

=== Coaching staff ===
2020 Georgia Southern Eagles coaching staff
- Kim Dean – Head Coach – 3rd year
- Dani Price – Assistant Head Coach – 2nd year
- Brock Van Faussien – Assistant Head Coach – 2nd year
- Kelsea Cichocki – Graduate Assistant Coach – 2nd year
- Olivia Clark-Kittleson – Graduate Assistant Coach – 2nd year

== Schedule and results ==
Legend
	Georgia Southern win
	Georgia Southern loss
	Postponement/Cancellation/Suspensions
**Bold**	Georgia Southern team member

2020 Georgia Southern Eagles softball game log
Regular season (14-10)

February (11-8)
Date	Opponent	Rank	Site/stadium	Score	Win	Loss	Save	TV	Attendance	Overall record	SBC record
Bash in the Boro
Feb. 7	East Tennessee State		Eagle Field at GS Softball Complex • Statesboro, GA	Game cancelled							
Feb. 7	Hartford		Eagle Field at GS Softball Complex • Statesboro, GA	**W** 10-2 (6 inn)	**Waldrep** (1-0)	Card (0-1)	None	True Blue Live	219	1-0	
Feb. 8	East Tennessee State		Eagle Field at GS Softball Complex • Statesboro, GA	**W** 9-3	**Morton** (1-0)	Boling (0-1)	None	True Blue Live	232	2-0	
Feb. 8	Rutgers		Eagle Field at GS Softball Complex • Statesboro, GA	**W** 9-1 (5 inn)	**Garcia** (1-0)	Vickers (1-1)	None	True Blue Live	208	3-0	
Feb. 9	Army		Eagle Field at GS Softball Complex • Statesboro, GA	**L** 5-7	Grete (1-1)	**Morton** (1-1)	Duong (1)	ESPN+	176	3-1	
Feb. 12	Mercer		Eagle Field at GS Softball Complex • Statesboro, GA	**W** 5-3	**Garcia** (2-0)	Byrd (0-2)	None	True Blue Live	192	4-1	
Citrus Classic at ESPN Wide World of Sports Complex
Feb. 14	vs. Saint Joseph's		ESPN Wide World of Sports Complex • Orlando, FL	**W** 5-1	**Garcia** (3-0)	Herr (0-1)	None		50	5-1	
Feb. 14	vs. Lehigh		ESPN Wide World of Sports Complex • Orlando, FL	**L** 0-1	Boyd (1-0)	**Waldrep** (1-1)	None		75	5-2	
Feb. 15	vs. Bethune–Cookman		ESPN Wide World of Sports Complex • Orlando, FL	**W** 5-1	**Garcia** (4-0)	Enriquez (0-1)	None		50	6-2	
Feb. 15	vs. Charleston Southern		ESPN Wide World of Sports Complex • Orlando, FL	**W** 4-0	**Waldrep** (2-1)	Heinrich (0-1)	None		50	7-2	
Feb. 16	vs. Charleston Southern		ESPN Wide World of Sports Complex • Orlando, FL	**W** 9-4	**Richardson** (1-0)	Junge (1-1)	None		50	8-2	
Eagle Round Robin
Feb. 21	Evansville		Eagle Field at GS Softball Complex • Statesboro, GA	**L** 8-14	Vetter (2-4)	**Garcia** (4-1)	None	True Blue Live	104	8-3	
Feb. 22	Monmouth		Eagle Field at GS Softball Complex • Statesboro, GA	**W** 13-2 (5 inn)	**Waldrep** (3-1)	Gletow (1-2)	None	True Blue Live	107	9-3	
Feb. 23	Maryland		Eagle Field at GS Softball Complex • Statesboro, GA	**L** 2-4	Wyche (2-3)	**Garcia** (4-2)	None	ESPN+	235	9-4	
Feb. 23	Furman		Eagle Field at GS Softball Complex • Statesboro, GA	**W** 5-1	**Richardson** (2-0)	Smith (1-7)	None	ESPN+	187	10-4	
Feb. 26	at No. 16 South Carolina		Carolina Softball Stadium • Columbia, SC	**L** 3-5	Heath (2-0)	**Waldrep** (3-2)	Betenbaugh (1)	SECN+	1,244	10-5	
Auburn Tigers Invitational
Feb. 28	vs. Binghamton		Jane B. Moore Field • Auburn, AL	**W** 8-2	**Waldrep** (4-2)	Bienkowski (0-3)	None			11-5	
Feb. 28	at Auburn		Jane B. Moore Field • Auburn, AL	**L** 4-5 (9 inn)	Yarbrough (3-0)	**Garcia** (4-3)	None	SECN+		11-6	
Feb. 29	at No. 18 Minnesota		Jane B. Moore Field • Auburn, AL	**L** 3-14 (6 inn)	Fiser (7-5)	**Waldrep** (4-3)	None			11-7	
Feb. 29	vs. Binghamton		Jane B. Moore Field • Auburn, AL	**L** 1-2 (8 inn)	Gibson (1-3)	**Garcia** (4-4)	None			11-8	

March (3-2)
Date	Opponent	Rank	Site/stadium	Score	Win	Loss	Save	TV	Attendance	Overall record	SBC record
Mar. 1	at Auburn		Jane B. Moore Field • Auburn, AL	**L** 0-6	Yarbrough (5-0)	**Waldrep** (4-4)	Swindle (1)		1,615	11-9	
Mar. 4	Boston College		Eagle Field at GS Softball Complex • Statesboro, GA	Game Cancelled							
Mar. 6	Louisiana–Monroe		Eagle Field at GS Softball Complex • Statesboro, GA	**W** 9-6	**Richardson** (3-0)	Coons (4-2)	None	ESPN+	127	12-9	1-0
Mar. 7	Louisiana–Monroe		Eagle Field at GS Softball Complex • Statesboro, GA	**W** 4-3	**Waldrep** (5-4)	Chavarria (0-1)	None	ESPN+	182	13-9	2-0
Mar. 8	Louisiana–Monroe		Eagle Field at GS Softball Complex • Statesboro, GA	**L** 3-6	Williams (5-2)	**Barfield** (0-1)	Watts (1)	ESPN+	217	13-10	2-1
Mar. 8	at College of Charleston		Patriots Point Athletic Complex • Charleston, SC	**W** 6-1	**Garcia** (5-4)	Sparkman (2-4)	None		155	14-10	
Mar. 13	at Troy		Troy Softball Complex • Troy, AL	Season suspended due to COVID-19 pandemic							
Mar. 14	at Troy		Troy Softball Complex • Troy, AL	Season suspended due to COVID-19 pandemic							
Mar. 15	at Troy		Troy Softball Complex • Troy, AL	Season suspended due to COVID-19 pandemic							
Mar. 17	at Furman		Pepsi Stadium • Greenville, SC	Season suspended due to COVID-19 pandemic							
Mar. 20	at Coastal Carolina		St. John Stadium–Charles Wade-John Lott Field • Conway, SC	Season suspended due to COVID-19 pandemic							
Mar. 21	at Coastal Carolina		St. John Stadium–Charles Wade-John Lott Field • Conway, SC	Season suspended due to COVID-19 pandemic							
Mar. 22	at Coastal Carolina		St. John Stadium–Charles Wade-John Lott Field • Conway, SC	Season suspended due to COVID-19 pandemic							
Mar. 25	at Kennesaw State		Bailey Park • Kennesaw, GA	Season suspended due to COVID-19 pandemic							
Mar. 27	UT Arlington		Eagle Field at GS Softball Complex • Statesboro, GA	Season suspended due to COVID-19 pandemic							
Mar. 28	UT Arlington		Eagle Field at GS Softball Complex • Statesboro, GA	Season suspended due to COVID-19 pandemic							
Mar. 29	UT Arlington		Eagle Field at GS Softball Complex • Statesboro, GA	Season suspended due to COVID-19 pandemic							

April (0–0)
Date	Opponent	Rank	Site/stadium	Score	Win	Loss	Save	TV	Attendance	Overall record	SBC record
Apr. 3	at Texas State		Bobcat Softball Stadium • San Marcos, TX	Season suspended due to COVID-19 pandemic							
Apr. 4	at Texas State		Bobcat Softball Stadium • San Marcos, TX	Season suspended due to COVID-19 pandemic							
Apr. 5	at Texas State		Bobcat Softball Stadium • San Marcos, TX	Season suspended due to COVID-19 pandemic							
Apr. 9	South Alabama		Eagle Field at GS Softball Complex • Statesboro, GA	Season suspended due to COVID-19 pandemic							
Apr. 10	South Alabama		Eagle Field at GS Softball Complex • Statesboro, GA	Season suspended due to COVID-19 pandemic							
Apr. 11	South Alabama		Eagle Field at GS Softball Complex • Statesboro, GA	Season suspended due to COVID-19 pandemic							
Apr. 17	at No. 8 Louisiana		Yvette Girouard Field at Lamson Park • Lafayette, LA	Season suspended due to COVID-19 pandemic							
Apr. 18	at No. 8 Louisiana		Yvette Girouard Field at Lamson Park • Lafayette, LA	Season suspended due to COVID-19 pandemic							
Apr. 19	at No. 8 Louisiana		Yvette Girouard Field at Lamson Park • Lafayette, LA	Season suspended due to COVID-19 pandemic							
Apr. 24	at Appalachian State		Sywassink/Lloyd Family Stadium • Boone, NC	Season suspended due to COVID-19 pandemic							
Apr. 25	at Appalachian State		Sywassink/Lloyd Family Stadium • Boone, NC	Season suspended due to COVID-19 pandemic							
Apr. 26	at Appalachian State		Sywassink/Lloyd Family Stadium • Boone, NC	Season suspended due to COVID-19 pandemic							
Apr. 30	at Georgia State		Robert E. Heck Softball Complex • Atlanta, GA	Season suspended due to COVID-19 pandemic							

May (0-0)
Date	Opponent	Rank	Site/stadium	Score	Win	Loss	Save	TV	Attendance	Overall record	SBC record
May 1	at Georgia State		Robert E. Heck Softball Complex • Atlanta, GA	Season suspended due to COVID-19 pandemic							
May 2	at Georgia State		Robert E. Heck Softball Complex • Atlanta, GA	Season suspended due to COVID-19 pandemic							

Post-Season (0-0)

SBC tournament (0-0)
Date	Opponent	(Seed)/Rank	Site/stadium	Score	Win	Loss	Save	TV	Attendance	Overall record	SBC record
May 6	TBD		Robert E. Heck Softball Complex • Atlanta, GA	Championship Series canceled to COVID-19 pandemic							

Schedule source:

*Rankings are based on the team's current ranking in the NFCA/USA Softball poll.
