= 2020 Texas State Bobcats softball team =

American college softball season

2020 Texas State Bobcats softball
- Conference: Sun Belt Conference
- Record: 15–9 (2–1 SBC)
- Head coach: Ricci Woodard (20th season)
- Assistant coaches: Haley Long; Paige McDuffee
- Home stadium: Bobcat Softball Stadium

2020 Sun Belt Conference softball standings
	Conf.				Overall
Team	W		L	PCT	W		L	PCT
No. 8 Louisiana ‍‍‍	2	–	1	.667	18	–	6	.750
Texas State ‍‍‍	2	–	1	.667	15	–	9	.625
Georgia Southern ‍‍‍	2	–	1	.667	14	–	10	.583
UT Arlington ‍‍‍	2	–	1	.667	12	–	13	.480
South Alabama ‍‍‍	2	–	1	.667	8	–	17	.320
Troy ‍‍‍	1	–	2	.333	16	–	6	.727
Coastal Carolina ‍‍‍	1	–	2	.333	13	–	8	.619
Appalachian State ‍‍‍	1	–	2	.333	13	–	9	.591
Louisiana–Monroe ‍‍‍	1	–	2	.333	10	–	14	.417
Georgia State ‍‍‍	1	–	2	.333	7	–	16	.304
† – Conference champion ‡ – Tournament champion y – Invited to the NCAA tournament As of March 13, 2020; Rankings from NFCA

The 2020 Texas State Bobcats softball team represented the Texas State University in the 2020 NCAA Division I softball season. The Bobcats played their home games at Bobcat Softball Stadium. The Bobcats were led by twentieth year head coach Ricci Woodard.

On March 12, the Sun Belt Conference announced the indefinite suspension of all spring athletics, including softball, due to the increasing risk of the COVID-19 pandemic. On March 16, the Sun Belt formally announced the cancelation of all spring sports, thus ending their season definitely.

== Preseason ==
=== Sun Belt Conference Coaches Poll ===
The Sun Belt Conference Coaches Poll was released on January 29, 2020. Texas State was picked to finish fourth in the Sun Belt Conference with 74 votes.

Coaches poll
Predicted finish	Team	Votes (1st place)
1	Louisiana	100 (10)
2	Troy	85
3	UT Arlington	77
4	Texas State	74
5	Coastal Carolina	56
6	Appalachian State	47
7	Georgia Southern	36
8	South Alabama	31
9	Louisiana-Monroe	26
10	Georgia State	18

=== Preseason All-Sun Belt team ===
- Summer Ellyson (LA, SR, Pitcher)
- Megan Kleist (LA, SR, Pitcher)
- Julie Rawls (LA, SR, Catcher)
- Reagan Wright (UTA, SR, Catcher)
- Katie Webb (TROY, SR, 1st Base)
- Kaitlyn Alderink (LA, SR, 2nd Base)
- Hailey Mackay (TXST, SR, 3rd Base)
- Alissa Dalton (LA, SR, Shortstop)
- Jayden Mount (ULM, SR, Shortstop)
- Whitney Walton (UTA, SR, Shortstop)
- Tara Oltmann (TXST, JR, Shortstop)
- Courtney Dean (CCU, JR, Outfield)
- Mekhia Freeman (GASO, SR, Outfield)
- Sarah Hudek (LA, SR, Outfield)
- Raina O'Neal (LA, JR, Outfield)
- Bailey Curry (LA, JR, Designated Player/1st Base)

=== National Softball Signing Day ===
Player	Position	Hometown	Previous Team
Caitlyn Bonjonia	Catcher	Katy, Texas	Cinco Ranch HS
Hannah Earls	Infielder	Willis, Texas	Willis HS
Ronni Grofman	Pitcher	Kingwood, Texas	Kingwood Park HS
Raina Lange	Infielder	Cypress, Texas	Bridgeland HS
Baylee Lemons	Infielder	Magnolia, Texas	Magnolia HS
Jessica Mullens	Pitcher	Tarkington, Texas	Barbers Hill HS
Piper Randolph	Outfielder	Salado, Texas	Salado HS

== Roster ==
2020 Texas State Bobcats roster
Pitchers: 1 Natalia Reeves - Redshirt Freshman; 8 Meagan King - Junior; 15 Tori McCann - Freshman; 18 Dalilah Barrera - Senior; 23 Brooke Blackwell - Sophomore; 16 Cassie Valdez - Sophomore; Outfielders: 2 Molly Damiani - Sophomore; 6 Marisa Cruz - Junior; 10 Kylie George - Junior; 21 Christiana McDowell - Senior	Catchers: 00 Cat Crenek - Sophomore; 13 Caitlyn Rogers - Sophomore; Infielders: 3 Bailee Carter - Senior; 5 Eliza Eberhard - Junior; 9 Maya Zavala - Freshman; 14 Kennedy Picou - Freshman; 19 Arieann Bell - Junior; 20 Sara Vanderford - Freshman; 22 Tara Oltmann - Junior; 25 Hailey Mackay - Senior; 27 Samara Lagway - Sophomore; Utility: 11 Kaylee Lind - Redshirt Freshman

=== Coaching staff ===
2020 Texas State Bobcats coaching staff
- Ricci Woodard – Head Coach – 20th year
- Haley Long – Assistant Head Coach – 3rd year
- Paige McDuffee – Assistant Head Coach – 1st year
- Josh Trevino – Volunteer Assistant Coach – 1st year

== Schedule and results ==
Legend
	Texas State win
	Texas State loss
	Postponement/Cancellation/Suspensions
**Bold**	Texas State team member

2020 Texas State Bobcats softball game log
Regular season (15-9)

February (11-6)
Date	Opponent	Rank	Site/stadium	Score	Win	Loss	Save	TV	Attendance	Overall record	SBC record
NFCA Leadoff Classic
Feb. 7	vs. South Alabama		Eddie C. Moore Complex • Clearwater, FL	**W** 5-2	**King** (1-0)	Rivers (0-1)	None	YouTube.Live	105	1-0	
Feb. 7	vs. No. 15 Kentucky		Eddie C. Moore Complex • Clearwater, FL	**L** 1-2	Baalman (1-0)	**McCann** (0-1)	None	YouTube.Live	321	1-1	
Feb. 8	vs. Louisville		Eddie C. Moore Complex • Clearwater, FL	**W** 7-3	**Barrera** (1-0)	Harris (0-2)	None	YouTube.Live	127	2-1	
Feb. 8	vs. No. 23 Auburn		Eddie C. Moore Complex • Clearwater, FL	**L** 1-3	Yarbrough (1-0)	**King** (1-1)	None	YouTube.Live	547	2-2	
Bobcat Classic
Feb. 13	UTSA		Bobcat Softball Stadium • San Marcos, TX	**W** 4-3	**McCann** (1-1)	Cortez (1-2)	None		457	3-2	
Feb. 14	St. Louis		Bobcat Softball Stadium • San Marcos, TX	**W** 4-1	**McCann** (2-1)	Wendling (1-1)	None		617	4-2	
Feb. 15	St. Louis		Bobcat Softball Stadium • San Marcos, TX	**W** 12-0 (5 inn)	**King** (2-1)	Hacke (1-2)	None		617	5-2	
Feb. 15	Wichita State		Bobcat Softball Stadium • San Marcos, TX	**W** 5-3	**McCann** (3-1)	Lange (2-3)	None		617	6-2	
Feb. 16	Wichita State		Bobcat Softball Stadium • San Marcos, TX	**W** 9-1 (6 inn)	**Barrera** (2-0)	Lange (2-5)	None		521	7-2	
Baylor Invitational
Feb. 21	vs. No. 17 Minnesota		Getterman Stadium • Waco, TX	**W** 3-2	**King** (3-1)	Pease (2-1)	**McCann** (1)			8-2	
Feb. 21	vs. Illinois		Getterman Stadium • Waco, TX	**L** 0-1	Jarvis (4-1)	**Barrera** (2-1)	Sickels (4)			8-3	
Feb. 22	vs. No. 17 Minnesota		Getterman Stadium • Waco, TX	**L** 0-4	Fiser (5-4)	**McCann** (3-2)	None			8-4	
Feb. 22	at Baylor		Getterman Stadium • Waco, TX	**L** 1-2	Pritchett (3-0)	**McCann** (3-2)	None	ESPN+		8-5	
Feb. 23	vs. Tulsa		Getterman Stadium • Waco, TX	**W** 2-0	**Barrera** (3-1)	Delce (3-2)	**McCann** (2)			9-5	
Capital Classic
Feb. 28	at Sacramento State		Shea Stadium • Sacramento, CA	**W** 2-0	**McCann** (4-3)	Sperry (2-2)	None		173	10-5	
Feb. 29	vs. Utah State		La Rue Field • Davis, CA	**L** 2-4	Toone (3-1)	**King** (3-2)	None		93	10-6	
Feb. 29	at UC Davis		La Rue Field • Davis, CA	**W** 6-2	**Barrera** (4-1)	Miles (1-1)	**McCann** (3)		93	11-6	

March (4-3)
Date	Opponent	Rank	Site/stadium	Score	Win	Loss	Save	TV	Attendance	Overall record	SBC record
Mar. 1	vs. St. Mary's		La Rue Field • Davis, CA	**W** 5-2	**King** (4-2)	Earle (2-1)	**McCann** (4)			12-6	
Mar. 1	at UC Davis		La Rue Field • Davis, CA	**L** 2-4	Brown (4-3)	**Barrera** (4-2)	None			12-7	
Mar. 4	Texas A&M–Corpus Christi		Bobcat Softball Stadium • San Marcos, TX	**W** 4-1	**McCann** (5-3)	Lombrana (4-5)	None	ESPN+	405	13-7	
Mar. 6	at Georgia State		Robert E. Heck Softball Complex • Atlanta, GA	**W** 16-0 (6 inn)	**Barrera** (5-2)	Freeman (1-4)	None		215	14-7	1-0
Mar. 7	at Georgia State		Robert E. Heck Softball Complex • Atlanta, GA	**L** 1-3	Mooney (3-3)	**McCann** (5-4)	None		132	14-8	1-1
Mar. 8	at Georgia State		Robert E. Heck Softball Complex • Atlanta, GA	**W** 7-0	**King** (5-2)	Buck (3-7)	None		143	15-8	2-1
Mar. 11	at Texas A&M		Davis Diamond • College Station, TX	**L** 1-2	Poynter (6-2)	**Barrera** (5-3)	Mayo (2)		1,207	15-9	
Mar. 13	Coastal Carolina		Bobcat Softball Stadium • San Marcos, TX	Season suspended due to COVID-19 pandemic							
Mar. 14	Coastal Carolina		Bobcat Softball Stadium • San Marcos, TX	Season suspended due to COVID-19 pandemic							
Mar. 15	Coastal Carolina		Bobcat Softball Stadium • San Marcos, TX	Season suspended due to COVID-19 pandemic							
Mar. 17	at Sam Houston State		Bearkat Softball Complex • Huntsville, TX	Season suspended due to COVID-19 pandemic							
Mar. 20	South Alabama		Bobcat Softball Stadium • San Marcos, TX	Season suspended due to COVID-19 pandemic							
Mar. 21	South Alabama		Bobcat Softball Stadium • San Marcos, TX	Season suspended due to COVID-19 pandemic							
Mar. 22	South Alabama		Bobcat Softball Stadium • San Marcos, TX	Season suspended due to COVID-19 pandemic							
Mar. 26	at Lamar		Lamar Softball Complex • Beaumont, TX	Season suspended due to COVID-19 pandemic							
Mar. 27	at No. 8 Louisiana		Yvette Girouard Field at Lamson Park • Lafayette, LA	Season suspended due to COVID-19 pandemic							
Mar. 28	at No. 8 Louisiana		Yvette Girouard Field at Lamson Park • Lafayette, LA	Season suspended due to COVID-19 pandemic							
Mar. 29	at No. 8 Louisiana		Yvette Girouard Field at Lamson Park • Lafayette, LA	Season suspended due to COVID-19 pandemic							

April (0–0)
Date	Opponent	Rank	Site/stadium	Score	Win	Loss	Save	TV	Attendance	Overall record	SBC record
Apr. 1	Baylor		Bobcat Softball Stadium • San Marcos, TX	Season suspended due to COVID-19 pandemic							
Apr. 3	Georgia Southern		Bobcat Softball Stadium • San Marcos, TX	Season suspended due to COVID-19 pandemic							
Apr. 4	Georgia Southern		Bobcat Softball Stadium • San Marcos, TX	Season suspended due to COVID-19 pandemic							
Apr. 5	Georgia Southern		Bobcat Softball Stadium • San Marcos, TX	Season suspended due to COVID-19 pandemic							
Apr. 7	at UTSA		Roadrunner Field • San Antonio, TX	Season suspended due to COVID-19 pandemic							
Apr. 9	at Appalachian State		Sywassink/Lloyd Family Stadium • Boone, NC	Season suspended due to COVID-19 pandemic							
Apr. 10	at Appalachian State		Sywassink/Lloyd Family Stadium • Boone, NC	Season suspended due to COVID-19 pandemic							
Apr. 11	at Appalachian State		Sywassink/Lloyd Family Stadium • Boone, NC	Season suspended due to COVID-19 pandemic							
Apr. 15	No. 3 Texas		Bobcat Softball Stadium • San Marcos, TX	Season suspended due to COVID-19 pandemic							
Apr. 17	Louisiana–Monroe		Bobcat Softball Stadium • San Marcos, TX	Season suspended due to COVID-19 pandemic							
Apr. 18	Louisiana–Monroe		Bobcat Softball Stadium • San Marcos, TX	Season suspended due to COVID-19 pandemic							
Apr. 19	Louisiana–Monroe		Bobcat Softball Stadium • San Marcos, TX	Season suspended due to COVID-19 pandemic							
Apr. 22	Houston Baptist		Bobcat Softball Stadium • San Marcos, TX	Season suspended due to COVID-19 pandemic							
Apr. 24	at Troy		Troy Softball Complex • Troy, AL	Season suspended due to COVID-19 pandemic							
Apr. 25	at Troy		Troy Softball Complex • Troy, AL	Season suspended due to COVID-19 pandemic							
Apr. 26	at Troy		Troy Softball Complex • Troy, AL	Season suspended due to COVID-19 pandemic							
Apr. 30	UT Arlington		Bobcat Softball Stadium • San Marcos, TX	Season suspended due to COVID-19 pandemic							

May (0-0)
Date	Opponent	Rank	Site/stadium	Score	Win	Loss	Save	TV	Attendance	Overall record	SBC record
May 1	UT Arlington		Bobcat Softball Stadium • San Marcos, TX	Season suspended due to COVID-19 pandemic							
May 2	UT Arlington		Bobcat Softball Stadium • San Marcos, TX	Season suspended due to COVID-19 pandemic							

Post-Season (0-0)

SBC tournament (0-0)
Date	Opponent	(Seed)/Rank	Site/stadium	Score	Win	Loss	Save	TV	Attendance	Overall record	SBC record
May 6	TBD		Robert E. Heck Softball Complex • Atlanta, GA	Championship Series canceled to COVID-19 pandemic							

Schedule source:

*Rankings are based on the team's current ranking in the NFCA/USA Softball poll.
