= Patriots Point Athletics Complex =

Sporting complex in Mt. Pleasant, South Carolina

- Interactive map of Patriots Point Athletics Complex
- Location: Mount Pleasant, SC, USA
- Coordinates: 32.795308°N 79.902159°W
- Owner: College of Charleston
- Operator: Charleston Athletics

Construction
- Built: 2001
- Opened: 2001
- Renovated: 2007

Patriots Point Athletics Complex is a sporting complex in Mt. Pleasant, South Carolina, across the Cooper River (following the Arthur Ravenel Jr. Bridge) from Charleston, South Carolina and adjacent to the maritime museum at Patriots Point. It is operated by the College of Charleston Cougars. Ground was broken in 2001. The facility is one of 90 college athletics programs to serve alcohol. It contains the following venues:

- CofC Baseball Stadium at Patriots Point
- Ralph Lundy Field at Patriots Point
