= Monmouth Hawks softball =

College softball team

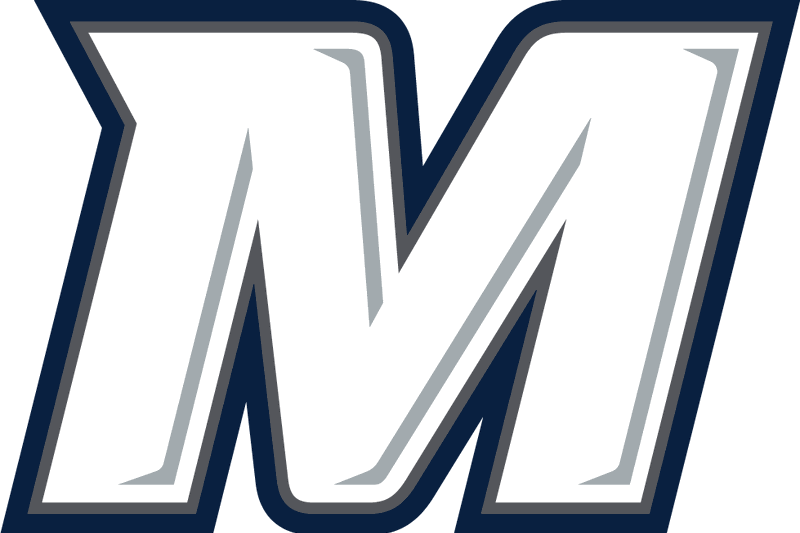
- University: Monmouth University
- Head coach: Shannon Salsburg (9th season)
- Conference: CAA
- Location: West Long Branch, New Jersey, US
- Home stadium: Monmouth University Softball Park
- Nickname: Hawks
- Colors: Midnight blue and white

NCAA Tournament appearances
- 2018, 2019

Conference tournament championships
- 2018, 2019

Regular-season conference championships
- NEC: 1999; MAAC: 2018, 2019, 2021

For information on all Monmouth University sports, see Monmouth Hawks

The Monmouth Hawks softball team represents Monmouth University in NCAA Division I college softball. The team participates in the Coastal Athletic Association (CAA). From 1984 until 2013, the team was a member of the Northeast Conference (NEC). From 2014 until 2022, the team was a member of the Metro Atlantic Athletic Conference (MAAC). The Hawks are currently led by head coach Shannon Salsburg. The team plays its home games at Monmouth University Softball Park which is located on the college's campus.

== History ==
Despite finishing in the top three of the Northeast Conference standings 10 times, the Hawks only managed to win the NEC regular season title once and failed win the conference tournament. After moving to the Metro Atlantic Athletic Conference in 2014, Monmouth found significantly more success by winning the MAAC regular season title three times, doing so in 2018, 2019, and 2021, and winning the conference tournament twice in 2018 and 2019.

The Hawks qualified for the 2018 NCAA Division I softball tournament, the Hawks first ever appearance in the tournament. In their first game of the tournament, they were defeated by Tennessee by a score of 9–0, losing via mercy rule in five innings. They were eliminated from the tournament by Ohio by a score of 4–0, failing to score a run in either game of their first NCAA tournament. Monmouth qualified for their second consecutive NCAA tournament in 2019. They again failed to score a single run in the tournament, losing initially to LSU 2–0 and were eliminated from the tournament by Louisiana Tech by a score of 1–0. The Hawks won their final regular season title in the MAAC in the 2021 season.

Monmouth officially joined the Coastal Athletic Association on July 1, 2022, after spending the last nine seasons in the MAAC.

=== Coaching history ===
Years	Coach	Record	%
1984	Rich DeFonce	8–11–1	.425
1985–1987	Virginia Sulovski	32–46	.410
1988	Lisa Leopold	13–16	.448
1989–1994	Patti Adorna	86–150–2	.366
1995–2001	Chris Wajda	205–133–3	.606
2002–2009	Carol Sullivan	179–176–2	.504
2010–2015	Louie Berndt	147–121	.549
2016–present	Shannon Salsburg	179–176	.504

== Roster ==
2024 Monmouth Hawks roster
Pitchers: 31 – Billie Kerwood – Junior; 74 – Olivia Lewis – Freshman; 22 – Kait Mulcahey – Senior; 21 – Ana Rodriguez – Senior; Catchers: 27 – Devin Coia – Senior; 10 – Savannah Simons – Sophomore; 35 – Abby Warner – Senior	Outfielders: 20 – Lexi Castaneda – Junior; 13 – Dani Dabroski – Graduate Student; 30 – Kiley O'Rourke – Senior; 33 – Tessa Thompson – Sophomore; Infielders: 28 – Mackenzie Bloss – Sophomore; 12 – Emily Churchill – Senior; 15 – Bri Lawson – Sophomore; 8 – Giana Scotti – Freshman; 4 – Isabella Slape – Junior; Utility: 14 – Kaitlynn Place – Sophomore

== Season-by-season results ==
Record table
Season	Coach	Overall	Conference	Standing	Postseason
Monmouth Hawks (Northeast Conference) (1984–2013)
1984	Rich DeFonce	8–11–1			
1985	Virginia Sulovski	14–7			
1986	Virginia Sulovski	7–16			
1987	Virginia Sulovski	11–23			
1988	Lisa Leopold	13–16			
1989	Patti Adorna	16–23			
1990	Patti Adorna	11–27–1			
1991	Patti Adorna	14–29			
1992	Patti Adorna	11–24–1			
1993	Patti Adorna	12–25			
1994	Patti Adorna	22–22	10–8	2nd	
1995	Chris Wajda	37–19–1	11–5	4th	
1996	Chris Wajda	23–25	12–4	2nd	
1997	Chris Wajda	24–27	8–8	6th	
1998	Chris Wajda	26–15–1	8–4	4th	
1999	Chris Wajda	35–13	14–4	1st	
2000	Chris Wajda	32–13–1	16–4	2nd	
2001	Chris Wajda	28–21	18–4	2nd	
2002	Carol Sullivan	18–23	12–10	5th	
2003	Carol Sullivan	17–27	13–9	4th	
2004	Carol Sullivan	19–23	12–6	3rd	
2005	Carol Sullivan	29–20	10–10	6th	
2006	Carol Sullivan	20–25	8–10	6th	
2007	Carol Sullivan	31–18	13–5	T–2nd	
2008	Carol Sullivan	19–22–1	9–8	5th	
2009	Carol Sullivan	26–18–1	11–7	3rd	
2010	Louie Berndt	30–18	15–4	2nd	
2011	Louie Berndt	21–21	10–10	6th	
2012	Louie Berndt	24–20	12–8	4th	
2013	Louie Berndt	31–16	15–5	3rd	
Monmouth Hawks (Metro Atlantic Athletic Conference) (2014–2022)
2014	Louie Berndt	22–21	12–8	5th	
2015	Louie Berndt	19–25	12–8	T–5th	
2016	Shannon Salsburg	29–21	13–7	T–3rd	
2017	Shannon Salsburg	25–31	11–9	5th	
2018	Shannon Salsburg	32–16	19–1	1st	NCAA Regionals
2019	Shannon Salsburg	36–18	16–4	T–1st	NCAA Regionals
2020	Shannon Salsburg	11–9	0–0	N/A	Season cut short due to COVID-19 pandemic
2021	Shannon Salsburg	25–9	25–7	1st	
2022	Shannon Salsburg	11–38	6–14	10th	
Monmouth Hawks (Coastal Athletic Association) (2023–present)
2023	Shannon Salsburg	10–34	8–16	9th	
2024	Shannon Salsburg	0–0	0–0		
Total:		849–829–8 (.506)			
National champion Postseason invitational champion Conference regular season champion Conference regular season and conference tournament champion Division regular season champion Division regular season and conference tournament champion Conference tournament champion

== See also ==
- List of NCAA Division I softball programs
