= Jaguar Field =

Softball park in Mobile, Alabama, United States

- Interactive map of Jaguar Field
- Location: Mitchell Center Drive and Old Shell Road; Mobile, Alabama (United States)
- Coordinates: 30°41′27.38″N 88°10′54.38″W
- Owner: University of South Alabama
- Operator: University of South Alabama
- Capacity: 1,050
- Field size: Left Field: 200 ft. Center Field: 220 ft. Right Field: 200 ft.

Construction
- Built: 2006
- Opened: 2007
- Renovated: 2014

Tenant
- University of South Alabama Jaguars softball team (SBC) (2007-present)

Jaguar Field is a softball field located on the University of South Alabama campus in Mobile, Alabama. The facility is the home field of the University of South Alabama Jaguars softball team and host of the 2010 Sun Belt Conference softball tournament. The complex was built in 2006 for the University of South Alabama Jaguars softball team's inaugural season in 2007.
