= Southland Conference softball tournament =

- Conference softball championship
- Sport: Softball
- Conference: Southland Conference
- Number of teams: 8
- Format: Double-elimination tournament
- Played: 1983-1990;1996-Present
- Last contest: 2026
- Current champion: McNeese
- Most championships: McNeese (10)
- TV partner: ESPN+
- Official website: Southland.org Softball

The Southland Conference softball tournament is the conference championship tournament in college softball for the Southland Conference (SLC). It is a double-elimination tournament and seeding is based on regular season records. The winner receives the conference's automatic bid to the NCAA Division I softball tournament.

== Tournament ==
The Southland Conference softball tournament is a double-elimination tournament held each year at various SLC campus stadiums. The number of tournament teams has varied over the years. After three years with a 7 team format, the 2025 tournament is moving back to an 8 team format. Of the twelve current conference members, University of New Orleans and UT Rio Grande Valley do not sponsor softball.

== History ==
The tournament was first held in 1983 when the conference began sponsoring softball. The tournament was not held from 1991 to 1995 and was canceled due to the COVID-19 pandemic in 2020.

== Champions ==
=== Year-by-year ===
Year	School	Venue	City	MVP **
1983	McNeese State (Note: Now branded athletically as McNeese, without "State".)	Beaumont Athletic Complex	Beaumont, Texas	No MVP
1984	Southwestern Louisiana (Note: Now branded athletically as Louisiana, with no city identifier.)	Unknown	Lafayette, Louisiana	No MVP
1985	Northeast Louisiana (Note: Now branded athletically as Louisiana–Monroe.)	ULM Softball Complex	Monroe, Louisiana	No MVP
1986	Northeast Louisiana	Allan Saxe Field	Arlington, Texas	No MVP
1987	Southwestern Louisiana	Unknown	Denton, Texas	No MVP
1988	Sam Houston State (Note: Now branded athletically as Sam Houston, without "State".)	Lady Demon Diamond	Natchitoches, Louisiana	Joanne Graham
1989	Southwest Texas State (Note: Now branded athletically as Texas State.)	Bearkat Softball Field	Huntsville, Texas	Debra Jones
1990	Stephen F. Austin	Bobcat Softball Stadium	San Marcos, Texas	Sandi Green
1991-1995	No conference tournament			
1996	Nicholls State (Note: Now branded athletically as Nicholls, without "State".)	Colonels Softball Complex	Thibodaux, Louisiana	Leslie Efferson
1997	Nicholls State	ULM Softball Complex	Monroe, Louisiana	Courtney Blades
1998	Northwestern State	Lady Demon Diamond	Natchitoches, Louisiana	Becca Allen
1999	Southwest Texas State	Lady Demon Diamond	Natchitoches, Louisiana	Amber Mosher
2000	Northwestern State	Lady Demon Diamond	Natchitoches, Louisiana	Erin Mancuso
2001	Southwest Texas State	Bobcat Softball Stadium	San Marcos, Texas	Jessica Chase
2002	Northwestern State	Lady Demon Diamond	Natchitoches, Louisiana	Amanda Ortego
2003	Texas–Arlington (Note: Now branded both athletically and academically as UT Arlington.)	Lady Demon Diamond	Natchitoches, Louisiana	Katy Cox
2004	Texas-San Antonio (Note: Now branded both athletically and academically as UTSA.)	Bobcat Softball Stadium	San Marcos, Texas	Ursula Mares
2005	McNeese State	North Oak Park	Hammond, Louisiana	Jessica Denham
2006	Texas-San Antonio	Lady Demon Diamond	Natchitoches, Louisiana	Jessica Els
2007	Sam Houston State	Bearkat Softball Complex	Huntsville, Texas	Brandi Crnkovic
2008	Stephen F. Austin	Bobcat Softball Stadium	San Marcos, Texas	Monika Covington
2009	Southwest Texas State	Cowgirl Diamond	Lake Charles, Louisiana	Chandler Hall
2010	McNeese State	Bobcat Softball Complex	San Marcos, Texas	Meagan Bond
2011	Southwest Texas State	Bearkat Softball Complex	Huntsville, Texas	Chandler Hall
2012	Southwest Texas State	Roadrunner Field	San Antonio, Texas	Chandler Hall
2013	Northwestern State	Lady Demon Diamond	Natchitoches, Louisiana	Kylie Roos
2014	Northwestern State	North Oak Park	Hammond, Louisiana	Kaylee Guidry
2015	Central Arkansas	Lady Demon Diamond	Natchitoches, Louisiana	Kylee Studioso
2016	McNeese State	Cowgirl Diamond	Lake Charles, Louisiana	Erika Piancastelli
2017	McNeese State	Farris Field	Conway, Arkansas	Erika Piancastelli
2018	McNeese State	Joe Miller Field	Lake Charles, Louisiana	Morgan Catron
2019	Sam Houston	Lady Demon Diamond	Natchitoches, Louisiana	Lindsey McLeod
2020	Canceled due to the COVID-19 pandemic			
2021	McNeese	North Oak Park	Hammond, Louisiana	Whitney Tate, McNeese
2022	McNeese	North Oak Park	Hammond, Louisiana	Crislyne Moreno, McNeese
2023	McNeese	Joe Miller Field	Lake Charles, Louisiana	Reese Reyna, McNeese
2024	Southeastern Louisiana	North Oak Park	Hammond, Louisiana	Lexi Johnson, Southeastern Louisiana
2025	Southeastern Louisiana	Joe Miller Field	Lake Charles, Louisiana	Chloe Magee, Southeastern Louisiana
2026	McNeese	Joe Miller Field	Lake Charles, Louisiana	Kassidy Chance, McNeese

Notes

- Former Southland members in italics.
- MVP from tournament champion team unless otherwise noted.

=== By school ===
Current Southland members, as of the next NCAA softball season in 2026, in bold.

School	Championships	Years
**McNeese** **(McNeese State)**	10	1983, 2005, 2010, 2016, 2017, 2018, 2021, 2022, 2023, 2026
Texas State (Southwest Texas State)	6	1989, 1999, 2001, 2009, 2011, 2012
**Northwestern State**	5	1998, 2000, 2002, 2013, 2014
Sam Houston (Sam Houston State)	3	1988, 2007, 2019
Louisiana–Monroe (Northeast Louisiana)	2	1985, 1986
Louisiana (Southwestern Louisiana)	2	1984, 1987
**Nicholls** (Nicholls State)	2	1996, 1997
**Southeastern Louisiana**	2	2024, 2025
**Stephen F. Austin**	2	1990, 2008
UTSA (Texas–San Antonio)	2	2004, 2006
Central Arkansas	1	2015
UT Arlington (Texas–Arlington)	1	2003

== See also ==
Southland Conference baseball tournament
