= 2018 Southland Conference softball tournament =

- Teams: 8
- Format: Single-elimination tournament (Gm 1-2), Double-elimination tournament (Gm 3-13)
- Finals site: Joe Miller Field; Lake Charles, Louisiana
- Champions: McNeese (6 title)
- Winning coach: James Landreneau (2nd title)
- MVP: Morgan Catron (McNeese)
- Television: ESPNU

2018 Southland Conference softball standings
	Conf.						Overall
Team	W		L		PCT		W	L		PCT
Nicholls ‍†‍‍	21	–	6	–	0	.778		40	–	15	–	0	.727
McNeese State** ‍‍‡‍^{y}	18	–	9	–	0	.667		41	–	21	–	0	.661
Southeastern Louisiana ‍‍‍	18	–	9	–	0	.667		38	–	21	–	0	.644
Stephen F. Austin ‍‍‍	18	–	9	–	0	.667		31	–	24	–	0	.564
Central Arkansas ‍‍‍	16	–	11	–	0	.593		29	–	27	–	0	.518
Abilene Christian ‍‍‍	15	–	12	–	0	.556		23	–	26	–	0	.469
Northwestern State ‍‍‍	14	–	13	–	0	.519		28	–	25	–	0	.528
Sam Houston State ‍‍‍	13	–	14	–	0	.481		24	–	33	–	0	.421
Lamar ‍‍‍	11	–	16	–	0	.407		27	–	28	–	0	.491
Incarnate Word ‍‍‍	7	–	20	–	0	.259		15	–	34	–	0	.306
Houston Baptist ‍‍‍	6	–	21	–	0	.222		9	–	34	–	0	.209
Texas A&M–Corpus Christi ‍‍‍	5	–	22	–	0	.185		14	–	37	–	1	.279
† – Conference champion ‡ – Tournament champion y – Invited to the NCAA tournament As of May 19, 2018; Rankings from NFCA

The 2018 Southland Conference tournament was held at Joe Miller Field on the campus of McNeese State University in Lake Charles, Louisiana, from May 8 through 11, 2018. The tournament winner earned the Southland Conference's automatic bid to the 2018 NCAA Division I softball tournament. The Championship game was broadcast on ESPNU. The remainder of the tournament aired on the Southland Digital Network.

== Format ==
With Abilene Christian and Incarnate Word both being eligible for the tournament, the Southland Conference expanded from 6 teams to the top 8 teams. The first two games were single elimination while the rest of the tournament was a double elimination format.

== Tournament ==
Elimination Game
5	Central Arkansas	1
8	Sam Houston State	9

Elimination Game
6	Abilene Christian	3
7	Northwestern State	4

Upper round 1
4	Southeastern Louisiana	7
8	Sam Houston State	0
3	McNeese	12
7	Northwestern State	5
Lower round 1
4	Southeastern Louisiana	6
7	Northwestern State	0
2	Stephen F. Austin	0
8	Sam Houston State	6

Upper round 2
1	Nicholls	7
4	Southeastern Louisiana	4
2	Stephen F. Austin	2
3	McNeese	8
Lower round 2
4	Southeastern Louisiana	7
8	Sam Houston State	6 _{(9)}

Upper final
1	Nicholls	2
3	McNeese	3 _{(8)}
Lower final
1	Nicholls	4
4	Southeastern Louisiana	1

Final
3	McNeese	4
1	Nicholls	1

- New Orleans does not sponsor a softball team.

== Line Scores ==
- All times listed are Central Daylight Time.

=== Day One ===
==== No. 5 Central Arkansas vs. No. 8 Sam Houston State ====
May 8, 2018 11:00 am CDT at Joe Miller Field; Lake Charles, LA Broadcaster: Bruce Merchant (Southland DN)
Team	1	2	3	4	5	6	7	R	H	E
No. 8 Sam Houston State	0	1	0	1	1	1	5	9	11	0
No. 5 Central Arkansas	0	0	0	0	0	0	1	1	5	2
WP: Lindsey McLeod (14–12) LP: Rachel Haberman (10–4) Sv: None; Home runs: SHSU: None; UCA: Codi Carpenter (5); Notes: 774; Boxscore

==== No. 6 Abilene Christian vs. No. 7 Northwestern State ====
May 8, 2018 1:30 pm CDT at Joe Miller Field; Lake Charles, LA Broadcaster: Bruce Merchant (Southland DN)
Team	1	2	3	4	5	6	7	R	H	E
No. 7 Northwestern State	0	0	0	0	0	4	0	4	5	2
No. 6 Abilene Christian	0	0	0	1	0	0	2	3	4	1
WP: Mic Bouvier (14–10) LP: Hannah Null (18–14) Sv: Mikay Brown (2); Home runs: NSU: Ha Barbazon (2); ACU: Kayla Keeling (3); Attendance: 774; Boxscore

==== No. 4 Southeastern Louisiana vs. No. 8 Sam Houston State ====
May 8, 2018 4:00 pm CDT at Joe Miller Field; Lake Charles, LA Broadcaster: Tony Taglavore (Southland DN)
Team	1	2	3	4	5	6	7	R	H	E
No. 8 Sam Houston State	0	0	0	0	0	0	0	0	5	0
No. 4 Southeastern Louisiana	0	0	0	5	1	1	X	7	10	0
WP: Rachel Hayes (16–8) LP: Kaitlynnn Dawson (2–5) Sv: None; Home runs: SHSU: None; SELA: None; Attendance: 774; Boxscore

==== No. 3 McNeese vs. No. 7 Northwestern State ====
May 8, 2018 6:30 pm CDT at Joe Miller Field; Lake Charles, LA Broadcaster: Tony Taglavore (Southland DN)
Team	1	2	3	4	5	6	7	R	H	E
No. 7 Northwestern State	3	0	0	2	0	0	0	5	7	1
No. 3 McNeese	4	2	0	5	0	1	X	12	12	1
WP: Alexandra Flores (17–9) LP: Mikay Brown (10–9) Sv: None; Home runs: NSU: Cayla Kones (2), Julie Rawls (10); MCN: Morgan Xateon (13); Attendance: 774; Boxscore

=== Day Two ===
==== No. 1 Nicholls vs. No. 4 Southeastern Louisiana ====
May 9, 2018 11:00 am CDT at Joe Miller Field; Lake Charles, LA Broadcaster: Richard Dow (Southland DN)
Team	1	2	3	4	5	6	7	R	H	E
No. 4 Southeastern Louisiana	0	0	0	2	1	0	1	4	9	1
No. 1 Nicholls State	0	2	1	1	2	1	X	7	11	1
WP: Megan Landry (22–7) LP: Rachel Hayes (16–9) Sv: None; Home runs: SELA: None; NICH: Moriah Strother (8); Attendance: 638; Boxscore

==== No. 2 Stephen F. Austin vs. No. 3 McNeese ====
May 9, 2018 1:30 pm CDT at Joe Miller Field; Lake Charles, LA Broadcaster: Richard Dow (Southland DN)
Team	1	2	3	4	5	6	7	R	H	E
No. 3 McNeese	0	1	2	1	0	0	4	8	8	1
No. 2 Stephen F. Austin	0	1	1	0	0	0	0	2	4	1
WP: Caroline Settle (9–6) LP: Makayla Sikes (18–9) Sv: None; Home runs: MCN: Morgan Catron (14), Aubree Turbeville (2); SFA: Margarita Corona (9); Attendance: 638; Boxscore

==== No. 7 Northwestern State vs. No. 4 Southeastern Louisiana ====
May 8, 2018 4:00 pm CDT at Joe Miller Field; Lake Charles, LA Broadcaster: Tony Taglavore (Southland DN)
Team	1	2	3	4	5	6	7	R	H	E
No. 4 Southeastern Louisiana	1	3	2	0	0	0	0	6	8	0
No. 7 Northwestern State	0	0	0	0	0	0	0	0	2	3
WP: Lacey Hill (12–6) LP: Mic Bouvier (14–11) Sv: None; Home runs: SELA: Ella Manzer (1); NSU: None; Attendance: 638; Boxscore

==== No. 8 Sam Houston State vs. No. 2 Stephen F. Austin ====
May 8, 2018 6:30 pm CDT at Joe Miller Field; Lake Charles, LA Broadcaster: Tony Taglavore (Southland DN)
Team	1	2	3	4	5	6	7	R	H	E
No. 2 Stephen F. Austin	0	0	0	0	0	0	0	0	3	3
No. 8 Sam Houston State	0	0	1	0	3	2	X	6	9	1
WP: Lindsey McLeod (15–12) LP: Makayla Sikes (18–10) Sv: None; Home runs: SFA: None; SHSU: Brooke Malia (5); Attendance: 638; Boxscore

=== Day Three ===
==== No. 1 Nicholls vs. No. 3 McNeese ====
May 10, 2018 11:00 am CDT at Joe Miller Field; Lake Charles, LA Broadcaster: Tony Taglavore (Southland DN)
Team	1	2	3	4	5	6	7	8	R	H	E
No. 1 Nicholls State	1	0	0	1	0	0	0	0	2	6	1
No. 3 McNeese	0	0	0	0	2	0	0	1	3	8	1
WP: Alexsandra Flores (18–9) LP: Alexis LaBure (13–5) Sv: None; Home runs: NSU: Kasey Frederick (7); MCN: Morgan Catron (15); Attendance: 374; Boxscore

==== No. 4 Southeastern Louisiana vs. No. 8 Sam Houston State ====
May 10, 2018 1:30 pm CDT at Joe Miller Field; Lake Charles, LA Broadcaster: Bruce Merchant (Southland DN)
Team	1	2	3	4	5	6	7	8	9	R	H	E
No. 8 Sam Houston State	0	0	0	1	1	2	1	1	0	6	9	1
No. 4 Southeastern Louisiana	0	0	0	0	0	3	2	1	1	7	9	2
WP: Tanner Wright (5–1) LP: Darby Fitzpatrick (0–9) Sv: None; Home runs: SHSU: Tiffany Thompson (8), Mahalia Gibson (12), Ella Manzer (2); SELA: None; Attendance: 374; Boxscore

==== No. 1 Nicholls vs. No. 4 Southeastern Louisiana ====
May 10, 2018 4:00 pm CDT at Joe Miller Field; Lake Charles, LA Broadcaster: Tony Taglavore, Lincoln Rose (Southland DN)
Team	1	2	3	4	5	6	7	R	H	E
No. 4 Southeastern Louisiana	1	0	0	0	0	0	0	1	4	2
No. 1 Nicholls	4	0	0	0	0	0	X	5	7	1
WP: Alexis LaBure (14–5) LP: Lacey Hill (12–7) Sv: Amanda Holliday (4); Home runs: SELA: None; NSU: Moriah Strother (9), Kali Clement (7); Attendance: 374; Boxscore

=== Day Four ===
==== Championship Game: No. 3 McNeese vs. No. 1 Nicholls ====
May 11, 2018 12:00 pm CDT at Joe Miller Field; Lake Charles, LA Broadcaster: Lincoln Rose, Kati Norse (ESPNU)
Team	1	2	3	4	5	6	7	R	H	E
No. 3 McNeese	1	0	0	0	0	0	3	4	4	0
No. 1 Nicholls	0	0	1	0	1	0	0	2	6	1
WP: Caroline Settle (10–6) LP: Alexis LaBure (14–6) Sv: Alexsandra Flores (2); Home runs: MCN: Justyce McClain (22); NSU: Kali Clement (8), Samantha Dares (2); Attendance: 498; Boxscore

== Awards and honors ==
Tournament MVP: Morgan Catron, McNeese

All-Tournament Teams:

- Morgan Catron, McNeese
- Moriah Strother, Nicholls
- Kasey Frederick, Nicholls
- Mahalia Gibson. Southeastern Louisiana
- Codi Carpenter, Sam Houston State
- Erika Piancastelli, McNeese
- Alexandria Saldivar, McNeese
- Maddie Edmonston, Southeastern Louisiana
- Amanda Gianelloni, Nicholls
- Megan Landry, Nicholls
- Lindsey McLeod, Sam Houston State
- Alexandria Flores, McNeese

== See also ==
2018 Southland Conference baseball tournament
