= 2013 Southland Conference softball tournament =

- Teams: 6
- Format: Double-elimination tournament
- Finals site: Lady Demon Diamond; Natchitoches, Louisiana
- Champions: Northwestern State (4 title)
- Winning coach: Donald Pickett (1 title)
- MVP: Kylie Roos (Northwestern State)
- Television: ESPN3

The 2013 Southland Conference tournament was held at Lady Demon Diamond on the campus of Northwestern State University in Natchitoches, Louisiana, from May 9 through 11, 2013. The tournament winner, Northwestern State earned the Southland Conference's automatic bid to the 2013 NCAA Division I softball tournament. Early rounds of the tournament were broadcast on the Southland Conference Digital Network. Both games of the championship round were carried on ESPN3, with Chris Mycoskie and Tony Taglavore on the call.

== Format ==
The top 6 teams qualified for the Southland softball tournament. The tournament was played using a double elimination format and included the maximum number of games in the format since a second game on championship day was required.

2013 Southland Conference softball standings
	Conf.						Overall
Team	W		L		PCT		W	L		PCT
McNeese State ** ‍‍‍	19	–	5	–	0	.792		38	–	15	–	0	.717
Northwestern State ‡ ‍‍‍	18	–	7	–	0	.720		40	–	15	–	0	.727
Sam Houston ‍‍‍	17	–	10	–	0	.630		37	–	24	–	0	.607
Central Arkansas ‍‍‍	15	–	10	–	0	.600		38	–	20	–	0	.655
Lamar ‍‍‍	14	–	13	–	0	.519		24	–	35	–	0	.407
Southeastern Louisiana ‍‍‍	13	–	13	–	0	.500		32	–	22	–	0	.593
Nicholls ‍‍‍	12	–	13	–	0	.480		22	–	26	–	0	.458
Stephen F. Austin ‍‍‍	9	–	17	–	0	.346		16	–	32	–	0	.333
Houston Baptist ‍‍‍	6	–	20	–	0	.231		15	–	27	–	0	.357
Texas A&M–Corpus Christi ‍‍‍	6	–	21	–	0	.222		11	–	39	–	0	.220
‡ – SLC Tournament Champion; **Southland Tournament #1 seed champion As of May 18, 2013; Rankings from USA Today/NFCA Coaches

== Tournament ==
Upper round 1
4	Central Arkansas	3
5	Lamar	0
3	Sam Houston State	6
6	Southeastern Louisiana	9
Lower round 1
1	McNeese State	0
4	Central Arkansas	1
2	Northwestern State	1
3	Sam Houston State	0

Upper round 2
1	McNeese State	1
6	Southeastern Louisiana	3
3	Sam Houston State	8
5	Lamar	4
Lower round 2
2	Northwestern State	5
4	Central Arkansas	2

Upper final
3	Sam Houston State	5
6	Southeastern Louisiana	1
Lower final
3	Sam Houston State	12
4	Central Arkansas	4

Final
2	Northwestern State	0
3	Sam Houston State	5

- All times listed are Central Daylight Time.

== Line Scores ==
=== Day One ===
==== Game 1 (Central Arkansas vs Lamar) ====
May 9, 2013 11:00 am CDT at Lady Demon Diamond, Natchitoches, LA
Team	1	2	3	4	5	6	7	R	H	E
Lamar	0	0	0	0	0	0	0	0	7	1
Central Arkansas	3	0	0	0	0	0	0	3	4	1
WP: Armstrong, K. (29–12) LP: Millman, S. (17–14) Sv: None

==== Game 2 (Southeastern Louisiana vs Sam Houston State) ====
May 9, 2013 1:30 pm CDT at Lady Demon Diamond, Natchitoches, LA
Team	1	2	3	4	5	6	7	R	H	E
Southeastern Louisiana	0	0	0	0	6	0	0	6	6	2
Sam Houston State	2	1	0	5	0	1	0	9	11	1
WP: Lancaster, S. (13–7) LP: Bishop, T. (7–9) Sv: Quinn, M. (2)

==== Game 3 (Central Arkansas vs McNeese State) ====
May 9, 2013 3:59 pm CDT at Lady Demon Diamond, Natchitoches, LA
Team	1	2	3	4	5	6	7	R	H	E
Central Arkansas	0	0	0	0	0	0	1	1	5	0
McNeese State	0	0	0	0	0	0	0	0	3	0
WP: Armstong, K. (30–13) LP: Bond, M. (18–6) Sv: None

==== Game 4 (Northwestern State vs Sam Houston State) ====
May 9, 2013 6:15 pm CDT at Lady Demon Diamond, Natchitoches, LA
Team	1	2	3	4	5	6	7	R	H	E
Sam Houston State	0	0	0	0	0	0	0	0	5	1
Northwestern State	1	0	0	0	0	0	0	1	4	0
WP: Roos, K. (15–3) LP: Quinn, M. (11–8) Sv: None

=== Day Two ===
==== Game 5 (McNeese State vs Southeastern Louisiana) ====
May 10, 2013 11:52 am CDT at Lady Demon Diamond, Natchitoches, LA
Team	1	2	3	4	5	6	7	R	H	E
McNeese State	0	1	0	0	0	0	0	1	4	1
Southeastern Louisiana	2	0	0	1	0	0	0	3	9	0
WP: Bishop, T. (8–9) LP: Allred, J. (18–6) Sv: None

==== Game 6 (Sam Houston State vs Lamar) ====
May 10, 2013 2:30 pm CDT at Lady Demon Diamond, Natchitoches, LA
Team	1	2	3	4	5	6	7	R	H	E
Sam Houston State	2	0	2	0	4	0	0	8	9	4
Lamar	0	1	0	0	0	0	3	4	6	2
WP: Lancaster, S. (14–7) LP: Millman, S. (17–16) Sv: None

==== Game 7 (Northwestern State vs Central Arkansas) ====
May 10, 2013 5:15 pm CDT at Lady Demon Diamond, Natchitoches, LA
Team	1	2	3	4	5	6	7	R	H	E
Northwestern State	0	2	0	0	0	0	3	5	9	1
Central Arkansas	0	0	0	0	2	0	0	2	11	2
WP: Roos, K. (16–3) LP: Armstrong, K. (30–13) Sv: None

==== Semi-final Game One (Southeastern Louisiana vs Sam Houston State) ====
May 10, 2013 2:00 pm CDT at Lady Demon Diamond, Natchitoches, LA
Team	1	2	3	4	5	6	7	R	H	E
Southeastern Louisiana	0	0	0	0	1	0	0	1	9	0
Sam Houston State	2	2	0	1	0	0	0	5	6	2
WP: Baros, H. (10–8) LP: Browne, J. (1–2) Sv: None

==== Semi-final Game Two (Sam Houston State vs Central Arkansas) ====
May 10, 2013 10:30 pm CDT at Lady Demon Diamond, Natchitoches, LA
Team	1	2	3	4	5	6	7	R	H	E
Sam Houston State	0	0	1	0	4	3	4	12	18	3
Central Arkansas	0	0	2	0	0	2	0	4	6	2
WP: Lancaster, S. (15–7) LP: Armstrong, K. (30–14) Sv: None

=== Day Three ===
==== Championship Game One (Sam Houston State vs Northwestern State) ====
May 11, 2013 2:05 pm CDT at Lady Demon Diamond, Natchitoches, LA
Team	1	2	3	4	5	6	7	R	H	E
Sam Houston State	0	1	1	1	0	1	1	5	12	1
Northwestern State	0	0	0	0	0	0	0	0	5	1
WP: Baros, H (11–8) LP: Roos, K. (16–4) Sv: None

==== Championship Game Two (Northwestern State vs Sam Houston State) ====
May 11, 2013 4:40 pm CDT at Lady Demon Diamond, Natchitoches, LA
Team	1	2	3	4	5	6	7	R	H	E
Northwestern State	0	1	0	2	0	0	2	5	8	0
Sam Houston State	1	0	0	0	0	3	0	4	9	0
WP: Roos, K. (17–4) LP: Lancaster, S. (15–8) Sv: None; Attendance: 713

== Awards and honors ==
Tournament MVP: Kylie Roos - Northwestern State

All-Tournament Teams:

- Kim Damian - Sam Houston State
- Alyssa Coggins - Sam Houston State
- Shelbi Tucker - Sam Houston State
- Tara McKenney - Northwestern State
- Ashley Isbell - Sam Houston State
- Cassandra Barefield - Northwestern State
- Kelsey Nichols - Southeastern Louisiana
- Tori Benavidez - Sam Houston State
- Sam Forrest - Central Arkansas
- Kelsie Armstrong - Central Arkansas
- Shelby Lancaster - Sam Houston State

== See also ==
2013 Southland Conference baseball tournament
