= 2017 Southland Conference softball tournament =

- Teams: 6
- Format: Double-elimination tournament
- Finals site: Farris Field; Conway, Arkansas
- Champions: McNeese State (5 title)
- Winning coach: Joanna Hardin (2 title)
- Television: ESPN3

2017 Southland Conference softball standings
	Conf.						Overall
Team	W		L		PCT		W	L		PCT
McNeese State ** ‍‍‡‍^{y}	24	–	3	–	0	.889		43	–	18	–	0	.705
Abilene Christian * ‍‍‍	20	–	7	–	0	.741		33	–	22	–	0	.600
Nicholls ‍‍‍	19	–	8	–	0	.704		37	–	20	–	0	.649
Lamar ‍‍‍	17	–	10	–	0	.630		34	–	31	–	0	.523
Sam Houston ‍‍‍	14	–	13	–	0	.519		24	–	27	–	0	.471
Central Arkansas ‍‍‍	14	–	13	–	0	.519		25	–	34	–	0	.424
Southeastern Louisiana ‍‍‍	12	–	15	–	0	.444		26	–	29	–	0	.473
Northwestern State ‍‍‍	12	–	15	–	0	.444		23	–	33	–	1	.412
Stephen F. Austin ‍‍‍	9	–	15	–	0	.375		17	–	33	–	0	.340
Houston Baptist ‍‍‍	8	–	19	–	0	.296		17	–	26	–	0	.395
Incarnate Word * ‍‍‍	6	–	21	–	0	.222		13	–	40	–	0	.245
Texas A&M–Corpus Christi ‍‍‍	4	–	20	–	0	.167		10	–	36	–	0	.217
† – Conference champion ‡ – SLC Tournament Champion *ineligible for postseason play due to Div. I transition **Southland Tournament #1 seed and regular season champion y – Invited to the NCAA Division I Baseball Championship; As of May 30, 2017; Rankings from USA Today/NFCA Coaches

The 2017 Southland Conference tournament was held at Farris Field on the campus of the University of Central Arkansas in Conway, Arkansas from May 10 through 12, 2017. The tournament winner, the McNeese State Cowgirls, earned the Southland Conference's automatic bid to the 2017 NCAA Division I softball tournament. The Championship game was broadcast on ESPN3 with the remainder of the tournament airing on the Southland Digital Network.

== Format ==
The top 6 teams qualified for the Southland softball tournament. Abilene Christian and Incarnate Word were ineligible due to their transition from D2 to D1. Abilene Christian finished the regular season in second place. Since Abilene Christian was ineligible for tournament play, the third through sixth-place finishers moved up in seeding. In addition, the Northwestern State Lady Demons, finishing the regular season in seventh place, qualified for the tournament.

== Tournament ==
Upper round 1
3	Lamar	4
6	Northwestern State	2
4	Sam Houston State	3
5	Central Arkansas	2
Lower round 1
2	Nicholls	2
3	Lamar	1
1	McNeese State	9
4	Sam Houston State	1

Upper round 2
5	Central Arkansas	2
3	Lamar	1
6	Northwestern State	4
4	Sam Houston State	2
Lower round 2
1	McNeese State	11
2	Nicholls	2

Upper final
5	Central Arkansas	7
6	Northwestern State	4
Lower final
2	Nicholls	4
5	Central Arkansas	2

Final
1	McNeese State	8
2	Nicholls	0

- New Orleans does not sponsor a softball team.
- All times listed are Central Daylight Time.

== See also ==
2017 Southland Conference baseball tournament
