= 2019 Southland Conference softball tournament =

- Teams: 8
- Format: Single-elimination tournament (Gm 1-2), Double-elimination tournament (Gm 3-13)
- Finals site: Lady Demon Diamond; Natchitoches, Louisiana
- Champions: Sam Houston State (3 title)
- MVP: Lindsey McCleod (Sam Houston State)
- Television: ESPNU

2019 Southland Conference softball standings
	Conf.				Overall
Team	W		L	PCT	W		L	PCT
Sam Houston State ‍†‍‡‍^{y}	22	–	5	.815	35	–	23	.603
Nicholls ‍‍‍	21	–	6	.778	34	–	22	.607
McNeese State ‍‍‍	19	–	8	.704	33	–	32	.508
Stephen F. Austin ‍‍‍	18	–	9	.667	36	–	23	.610
Southeastern Louisiana ‍‍‍	17	–	10	.630	34	–	23	.596
Northwestern State ‍‍‍	15	–	12	.556	30	–	27	.526
Lamar ‍‍‍	14	–	13	.519	23	–	34	.404
Central Arkansas ‍‍‍	12	–	15	.444	26	–	28	.481
Houston Baptist ‍‍‍	10	–	17	.370	23	–	23	.500
Abilene Christian ‍‍‍	6	–	21	.222	13	–	31	.295
Incarnate Word ‍‍‍	4	–	22	.154	8	–	40	.167
Texas A&M–Corpus Christi ‍‍‍	3	–	23	.115	8	–	43	.157
† – Conference champion ‡ – Tournament champion y – Invited to the NCAA tournament As of May 19, 2019; Rankings from NFCA

The 2019 Southland Conference tournament was held at Lady Demon Diamond on the campus of Northwestern State University in Natchitoches, Louisiana, from May 7 through 10, 2019. The tournament winner, Sam Houston State, earned the Southland Conference's automatic bid to the 2019 NCAA Division I softball tournament. The Championship game was broadcast on ESPNU. The remainder of the tournament aired on the Southland Digital Network.

== Format ==
The 2019 tournament marked the second year with expanded format including the top 8 teams following Abilene Christian and Incarnate Word's eligibility for the tournament. The first two games were single elimination while the rest of the tournament was a double elimination format.

== Tournament ==
Elimination Game
8	Central Arkansas	6
5	Southeastern Louisiana	7

Elimination Game
7	Lamar	0
7	Northwestern State	4

Upper round 1
4	Stephen F. Austin	0
5	Southeastern Louisiana	2
3	McNeese State	3
6	Northwestern State	4
Lower round 1
4	Stephen F. Austin	6
6	Northwestern State	1
1	Sam Houston State	2
2	Nicholls	0

Upper round 2
1	Sam Houston State	7
5	Southeastern Louisiana	0
1	Nicholls	9
6	Northwestern State	0
Lower round 2
3	McNeese State	3
4	Stephen F. Austin	0

Upper final
3	McNeese State	1
5	Southeastern Louisiana	0
Lower final
3	McNeese State	4
2	Nicholls	10

Final
1	Sam Houston State	2
2	Nicholls	1

- New Orleans does not sponsor a softball team.

== Awards and honors ==
Tournament MVP: Lindsey McCleod, Sam Houston State

All-Tournament Teams:

- Cayla Jones, Northwestern State
- Justyce McClain, McNeese State
- Margarita Corona, Stephen F. Austin
- Kassidy Wilbur, Stephen F. Austin
- Kali Clement, Nicholls
- Kasey Frederick, Nicholls
- Caitlin Garcia, Nicholls
- Meegan Landry, Nicholls
- Tiffany Thompson, Sam Houston State
- Brooke Malia, Sam Houston State
- Bailey White, Sam Houston State
- Lindsey McCleod, Sam Houston State (MVP)

== See also ==
2019 Southland Conference baseball tournament
