= 2016 Southland Conference softball tournament =

Sports tournament

- Teams: 6
- Format: Double-elimination tournament
- Finals site: Cowgirl Diamond; Lake Charles, Louisiana
- Champions: McNeese State (4 title)
- Winning coach: Joanna Hardin (1 title)
- MVP: Erika Piancastelli (McNeese State)
- Television: ESPN3

2016 Southland Conference softball standings
	Conf.				Overall
Team	W		L	PCT	W		L	PCT
East Division
McNeese State ** ^{x}‍‍‡‍^{y}	23	–	4	.852	42	–	12	.778
Nicholls ‍‍‍	21	–	5	.808	39	–	17	.696
Lamar ‍‍‍	18	–	9	.667	35	–	22	.614
Central Arkansas ‍‍‍	16	–	11	.593	35	–	22	.614
Northwestern State ‍‍‍	10	–	17	.370	27	–	25	.519
Southeastern Louisiana ‍‍‍	6	–	21	.222	23	–	32	.418
West Division
Abilene Christian * ^{x}‍‍‍	19	–	8	.704	26	–	21	.553
Stephen F. Austin ‍‍‍	13	–	13	.500	28	–	29	.491
Sam Houston ‍‍‍	13	–	14	.481	21	–	33	.389
Texas A&M–Corpus Christi ‍‍‍	7	–	19	.269	18	–	30	.375
Houston Baptist ‍‍‍	7	–	19	.269	15	–	29	.341
Incarnate Word * ‍‍‍	7	–	20	.259	18	–	34	.346
‡ – SLC Tournament Champion *ineligible for postseason play due to Div. I transition **Southland Tournament #1 seed champion As of May 13, 2016; Rankings from USA Today/NFCA Coaches

The 2016 Southland Conference tournament was held at Cowgirl Diamond on the campus of McNeese State University in Lake Charles, Louisiana, from May 11 through 13, 2016. The tournament winner, the McNeese State Cowgirls, earned the Southland Conference's automatic bid to the 2016 NCAA Division I softball tournament. The Championship game was broadcast on ESPN3 with the remainder of the tournament airing on the Southland Digital Network.

== Format ==
The top 6 teams qualified for the Southland softball tournament. Abilene Christian and Incarnate Word were ineligible due to their transition from D2 to D1. Abilene Christian finished the regular season in third place. Since Abilene Christian was ineligible for tournament play, the fourth through seventh place finishers moved up in seeding. In addition, the Sam Houston Bearkats, finishing the regular season in seventh place, qualified for the tournament.

== Tournament ==
Upper round 1
3	Lamar	6
6	Sam Houston State	2
4	Central Arkansas	3
5	Stephen F. Austin	4
Lower round 1
2	Nicholls	2
3	Lamar	7
1	McNeese State	8
4	Stephen F. Austin	2

Upper round 2
5	Stephen F. Austin	14
6	Sam Houston State	11
2	Nicholls	3
4	Central Arkansas	1
Lower round 2
1	McNeese State	8
3	Lamar	4

Upper final
2	Nicholls	0
5	Stephen F. Austin	1
Lower final
3	Lamar	5
5	Stephen F. Austin	3

Final
1	McNeese State	5
3	Lamar	2

- New Orleans does not sponsor a softball team.
- All times listed are Central Daylight Time.

== Line Scores ==
=== Day One ===
==== Game 1 (Sam Houston State vs Lamar) ====
May 11, 2016 11:00 am CDT at Cowgirl Diamond, Lake Charles, LA
Team	1	2	3	4	5	6	7	R	H	E
Sam Houston State	0	0	0	0	2	0	0	2	4	2
Lamar	0	2	0	1	1	2	0	6	11	2
WP: Luna, C. (16–7) LP: McLeod, L. (10–11) Sv: None

==== Game 2 (Stephen F. Austin vs Central Arkansas) ====
May 11, 2016 1:50 pm CDT at Cowgirl Diamond, Lake Charles, LA
Team	1	2	3	4	5	6	7	R	H	E
Stephen F. Austin	2	0	0	0	0	0	2	4	5	0
Central Arkansas	0	1	0	0	0	0	2	3	7	2
WP: Guffey, C. (11–5) LP: Landeros, S. (21–13) Sv: None

==== Game 3 (Lamar vs Nicholls) ====
May 11, 2016 4 pm CDT at Cowgirl Diamond, Lake Charles, LA
Team	1	2	3	4	5	6	7	R	H	E
Lamar	5	0	0	0	2	0	0	7	6	1
Nicholls	0	0	0	0	0	2	0	2	10	3
WP: Napoli, L. (9–7) LP: Haydel, H (22–8) Sv: None

==== Game 4 (Stephen F. Austin vs McNeese State) ====
May 11, 2016 6:30 pm CDT at Cowgirl Diamond, Lake Charles, LA
Team	1	2	3	4	5	6	7	R	H	E
Stephen F. Austin	0	0	0	2	0	0	0	2	4	4
McNeese State	0	0	3	0	5	0	0	8	5	3
WP: Vincent, E. (15–3) LP: Sikes, M. (7–12) Sv: None; Attendance: 1,023

=== Day Two ===
==== Game 5 (Stephen F. Austin vs Sam Houston State) ====
May 12, 2016 11:00 am CDT at Cowgirl Diamond, Lake Charles, LA
Team	1	2	3	4	5	6	7	R	H	E
Stephen F. Austin	0	1	0	0	2	0	11	14	11	4
Sam Houston State	2	0	4	0	0	4	1	11	10	0
WP: Sikes, M. (8–12) LP: McLeod, L. (11–11) Sv: None

==== Game 6 (Central Arkansas vs Nicholls State) ====
May 12, 2016 1:30 pm CDT at Cowgirl Diamond, Lake Charles, LA
Team	1	2	3	4	5	6	7	R	H	E
Central Arkansas	0	0	0	0	1	0	0	1	2	0
Nicholls	0	0	0	1	0	2	0	3	5	1
WP: Haydel, H. (23–8) LP: Landeros, S. (21–15) Sv: None

==== Game 7 (Lamar vs McNeese State) ====
May 12, 2016 4:00 pm CDT at Cowgirl Diamond, Lake Charles, LA
Team	1	2	3	4	5	6	7	R	H	E
Lamar	0	0	3	1	0	1	0	4	7	1
McNeese State	4	0	0	3	1	0	0	8	9	3
WP: Allred, J. (17–3) LP: Luna, C. (16–8) Sv: None

==== Semi-final Game One (Nicholls vs Stephen F. Austin) ====
May 12, 2016 6:30 CDT at Cowgirl Diamond, Lake Charles, LA
Team	1	2	3	4	5	6	7	R	H	E
Nicholls	0	0	0	0	0	0	0	0	5	0
Stephen F. Austin	0	0	0	1	0	0	0	1	2	0
WP: Guffey, C. (13–5) LP: Landry, M. (15–8) Sv: None; Attendance: 892

=== Day Three ===
==== Semi-final Game Two (Lamar vs Stephen F. Austin) ====
May 13, 2016 10:30 am CDT at Cowgirl Diamond, Lake Charles, LA
Team	1	2	3	4	5	6	7	R	H	E
Stephen F. Austin	0	0	0	0	0	1	2	3	5	1
Lamar	2	2	0	0	0	1	0	5	6	4
WP: Luna, C. (17–7) LP: Sikes, M. (8–13) Sv: None

==== Championship Game (Lamar vs McNeese State) ====
May 13, 2016 2:00 pm CDT at Cowgirl Diamond, Lake Charles, LA
Team	1	2	3	4	5	6	7	R	H	E
McNeese State	0	0	3	0	1	1	0	5	8	3
Lamar	1	0	0	0	0	1	0	2	2	4
WP: Vincent, E. (16–3) LP: Napoli, L. (9–8) Sv: None; Attendance: 965

== Awards and honors ==
Tournament MVP: Erika Piancastelli, McNeese State

All-Tournament Teams:

- Morgan Catron, McNeese State
- Tori Yanator, McNeese State
- Emily Vincent, McNeese State
- Brittany Rodriguez, Lamar
- Jenna Holland, Lamar
- Ciara Luna, Lamar
- Kelly Meeuwsen, Lamar
- Stephanie Meeuwsen, Lamar
- Taylor Fraccastoro, Stephen F. Austin
- Annie Mehringer, Stephen F. Austin
- Callee Guffey, Stephen F. Austin

== See also ==
2016 Southland Conference baseball tournament
