= 2010 Southland Conference softball tournament =

- Teams: 6
- Format: Double-elimination tournament
- Finals site: Bobcat Softball Complex; San Marcos, Texas
- Champions: McNeese State (3 title)
- Winning coach: Natalie Poole (1 title)
- MVP: Meagan Boyd (McNeese State)
- Television: Southland Conference Television Network

The 2010 Southland Conference tournament was held at Bobcat Softball Complex on the campus of Texas State University in San Marcos, Texas, from May 13 through 15, 2010. The tournament winner, McNeese State earned the Southland Conference's automatic bid to the 2010 NCAA Division I softball tournament. The Championship game was broadcast over the regionally syndicated Southland Conference Television Network for the first time with the remainder of the tournament airing on the Southland Digital Network. Doug Anderson and LaDarrin McClane called the games.

== Format ==
The top 6 teams qualified for the Southland softball tournament. The tournament was played in a double-elimination format with a maximum of eleven games.

2010 Southland Conference softball standings
	Conf.				Overall
Team	W		L	PCT	W		L	PCT
Stephen F. Austin ** ‍‍‍	20	–	10	.667	29	–	20	.592
Texas State ‍‍‍	20	–	10	.667	27	–	26	.509
Texas–Arlington ‍‍‍	16	–	12	.571	29	–	25	.537
McNeese State ‡ ‍‍‍	17	–	13	.567	38	–	27	.585
Texas A&M–Corpus Christi ‍‍‍	16	–	14	.533	35	–	22	.614
Nicholls ‍‍‍	16	–	14	.533	25	–	22	.532
Texas–San Antonio ‍‍‍	15	–	15	.500	23	–	29	.442
Central Arkansas ‍‍‍	13	–	16	.448	25	–	31	.446
Sam Houston ‍‍‍	13	–	16	.448	21	–	28	.429
Northwestern State ‍‍‍	13	–	17	.433	27	–	27	.500
Southeastern Louisiana ‍‍‍	3	–	25	.107	11	–	37	.229
‡ – SLC Tournament Champion; **Southland Tournament #1 seed champion As of May 22, 2011; Rankings from USA Today/NFCA Coaches

== Tournament ==
Upper round 1
4	McNeese State	6
5	Texas A&M-Corpus Christi	0
3	Texas-Arlington	3
6	Nicholls State	2
Lower round 1
1	Stephen F. Austin	1
4	McNeese State	4
2	Texas State	10
3	Texas-Arlington	1

Upper round 2
1	Stephen F. Austin	8
6	Nicholls State	4
3	Texas-Arlington	3
5	Texas A&M-Corpus Christi	2
Lower round 2
2	Texas State	1
4	McNeese State	0

Upper final
1	Stephen F. Austin	0
3	Texas-Arlington	2
Lower final
2	Texas State	4
3	Texas-Arlington	1

Final
2	Texas State	2
4	McNeese State	3

- All times listed are Central Daylight Time.

== Line Scores ==
=== Day One ===
==== Game 1 (Texas A&M-Corpus Christi vs McNeese State) ====
May 13, 2010 11:02 am CDT at Bobcat Softball Complex, San Marcos, Texas
Team	1	2	3	4	5	6	7	R	H	E
Texas A&M-Corpus Christi	0	0	0	0	0	0	0	0	0	0
McNeese State	0	1	2	0	1	2	0	6	10	2
WP: Bond, M. (21–10) LP: Tallman, A. (12–8) Sv: None

==== Game 2 (Nicholls State vs Texas-Arlington) ====
May 13, 2010 1:29 pm CDT at Bobcat Softball Complex, San Marcos, Texas
Team	1	2	3	4	5	6	7	R	H	E
Nicholls State	1	1	0	0	0	0	0	2	5	0
Texas-Arlington	0	0	2	0	0	0	1	3	10	2
WP: Lyles, T. (14–13) LP: Gros, L. (13–8) Sv: None

==== Game 3 (McNeese State vs Stephen F. Austin) ====
May 13, 2010 4:16 pm CDT at Bobcat Softball Complex, San Marcos, Texas
Team	1	2	3	4	5	6	7	R	H	E
McNeese State	2	0	0	1	1	0	0	4	0	0
Stephen F. Austin	0	0	0	0	1	0	0	1	5	1
WP: Shepherd, K. (9–8) LP: Covington, M. (14–11) Sv: None

==== Game 4 (Texas-Arlington vs Texas State) ====
May 13, 2010 6:45 pm CDT at Bobcat Softball Complex, San Marcos, Texas
Team	1	2	3	4	5	6	7	R	H	E
Texas-Arlington	0	0	0	0	1	0	0	1	4	1
Texas State	7	3	0	0	0	0	0	10	12	1
WP: Hall, C. (18–13) LP: Lyles, T. (14–14) Sv: None; Attendance: 505

=== Day Two ===
==== Game 5 (Stephen F. Austin vs Nicholls State) ====
May 14, 2010 6:30 pm CDT at Bobcat Softball Complex, San Marcos, Texas
Team	1	2	3	4	5	6	7	R	H	E
Stephen F. Austin	2	0	0	3	0	1	2	8	8	2
Nicholls State	1	0	2	1	0	0	0	4	9	3
WP: White, A. (14–8) LP: Wood, A. (6–7) Sv: Covington, M. (2)

==== Game 6 (Texas-Arlington vs Texas A&M-Corpus Christi) ====
May 14, 2010 9:23 pm CDT at Bobcat Softball Complex, San Marcos, Texas
Team	1	2	3	4	5	6	7	R	H	E
Texas-Arlington	0	3	0	0	0	0	0	3	6	2
Texas A&M-Corpus Christi	0	0	0	1	0	0	1	2	8	0
WP: Hulme, C. (14–10) LP: Tallman, A. (12–9) Sv: Lyles, T. (3); Attendance: 412

=== Day Three ===
==== Game 7 (Texas State vs McNeese State) ====
May 15, 2010 9:55 am CDT at Bobcat Softball Complex, San Marcos, Texas
Team	1	2	3	4	5	6	7	R	H	E
Texas State	0	0	0	0	0	0	0	0	3	2
McNeese State	0	0	0	0	0	0	1	1	4	0
WP: Bond, M. (22–10) LP: Hall, C. (18–14) Sv: None

==== Semi-final Game One (Stephen F. Austin vs Texas-Arlington) ====
May 15, 2010 12:35 pm CDT at Bobcat Softball Complex, San Marcos, Texas
Team	1	2	3	4	5	6	7	R	H	E
Stephen F. Austin	0	0	0	0	0	0	0	0	6	0
Texas-Arlington	0	0	0	2	0	0	0	2	6	0
WP: Lyles, T. (15–14) LP: Covington, M. (14–11) Sv: None

==== Semi-final Game Two (Texas-Arlington vs Texas State) ====
May 15, 2010 2:51 pm CDT at Bobcat Softball Complex, San Marcos, Texas
Team	1	2	3	4	5	6	7	R	H	E
Texas-Arlington	0	0	1	0	0	0	0	1	5	0
Texas State	0	1	0	1	2	0	0	4	6	0
WP: Dennis, L. (3–5) LP: Hulme, C. (14–11) Sv: Hall, C. (2)

==== Championship Game (McNeese State vs Texas State) ====
May 15, 2010 6:05 pm CDT at Bobcat Softball Complex, San Marcos, Texas
Team	1	2	3	4	5	6	7	R	H	E
McNeese State	0	0	0	2	1	0	0	3	8	0
Texas State	2	0	0	0	0	0	0	2	5	2
WP: Shepherd, K. (10–8) LP: Dennis, L. (3–6) Sv: None; Attendance: 506

== Awards and honors ==
Tournament MVP: Meagan Bond - McNeese State

All-Tournament Teams:

- Kendal Harper - Stephen F. Austin
- Teri Lyles - Texas-Arlington
- McKenzie Baak - Texas State
- Jenna Emery - Texas State
- Chandler Hall - Texas State
- Anna Hernandez - Texas State
- Molly Guidry - McNeese State
- Marissa Koetting - McNeese State
- Heather Mosser - McNeese State
- Claire Terracina - McNeese State
- Meagan Bond - McNeese State

== See also ==
2010 Southland Conference baseball tournament
