= 2011 Southland Conference softball tournament =

- Teams: 6
- Format: Double-elimination tournament
- Finals site: Bearkat Softball Complex; Huntsville, Texas
- Champions: Texas State (5th title)
- Winning coach: Ricci Woodard (3rd title)
- MVP: Chandler Hall (Texas State)
- Television: Southland Conference Television Network

The 2011 Southland Conference tournament was held at Bearkat Softball Complex on the campus of Sam Houston State University in Huntsville, Texas, from May 12 through 14, 2011. The tournament winner earned the Southland Conference's automatic bid to the 2011 NCAA Division I softball tournament. The championship was syndicated regionally via the Southland Conference Television Network, called by Doug Anderson and Chris Mycoskie. The remainder of the tournament was streamed live on SLC NOW.

== Format ==
The top 6 teams qualified for the Southland softball tournament. The tournament was played in a double-elimination format including a maximum of 11 games.

2011 Southland Conference softball standings
	Conf.				Overall
Team	W		L	PCT	W		L	PCT
Texas A&M–Corpus Christi ** ‍‍‍	21	–	9	.700	41	–	19	.683
Texas–Arlington ‍‍‍	20	–	10	.667	33	–	25	.569
Texas State ‡ ‍‍‍	20	–	10	.667	33	–	25	.569
McNeese State ‍‍‍	18	–	12	.600	31	–	29	.517
Texas–San Antonio ‍‍‍	17	–	13	.567	28	–	27	.509
Northwestern State ‍‍‍	15	–	15	.500	32	–	25	.561
Sam Houston ‍‍‍	14	–	15	.483	22	–	32	.407
Central Arkansas ‍‍‍	12	–	18	.400	26	–	30	.464
Southeastern Louisiana ‍‍‍	11	–	19	.367	22	–	30	.423
Stephen F. Austin ‍‍‍	9	–	21	.300	14	–	36	.280
Nicholls ‍‍‍	7	–	22	.241	15	–	37	.288
‡ – SLC Tournament Champion; **Southland Tournament #1 seed champion As of May 22, 2011; Rankings from USA Today/NFCA Coaches

== Tournament ==
Upper round 1
4	McNeese State	7
5	UTSA	1
3	Texas State	8
6	Northwestern State	0
Lower round 1
1	Texas A&M-Corpus Christi	0
4	McNeese State	1
2	Texas-Arlington	1
3	Texas State	6

Upper round 2
1	Texas A&M-Corpus Christi	5
6	Northwestern State	1
2	Texas-Arlington	3
5	UTSA	4
Lower round 2
3	Texas State	2
4	McNeese State	1

Upper final
1	Texas A&M-Corpus Christi	6
5	UTSA	5
Lower final
1	Texas A&M-Corpus Christi	8
4	McNeese State	6

Final
1	Texas A&M-Corpus Christi	5
3	Texas State	8

- All times listed are Central Daylight Time.

== Line Scores ==
=== Day One ===
==== Game 1 (UTSA vs McNeese State) ====
May 12, 2011 11:00 am CDT at Bearkat Softball Complex, Huntsville, TX
Team	1	2	3	4	5	6	7	R	H	E
UTSA	0	0	1	0	0	0	0	1	6	3
McNeese State	0	0	0	0	4	3	0	7	9	0
WP: Shepard, K. (19–16) LP: Humpal, E. (10–5) Sv: None

==== Game 2 (Northwestern State vs Texas State) ====
May 12, 2011 5:22 pm CDT at Bearkat Softball Complex, Huntsville, TX
Team	1	2	3	4	5	6	7	R	H	E
Northwestern State	0	0	0	0	0	0	0	0	3	5
Texas State	1	1	1	1	0	4	0	8	12	0
WP: Hall, C. (14–15) LP: Grimes, K. (11–8) Sv: None

==== Game 3 (McNeese State vs Texas A&M-Corpus Christi) ====
May 12, 2011 7:37 pm CDT at Bearkat Softball Complex, Huntsville, TX
Team	1	2	3	4	5	6	7	R	H	E
McNeese State	0	0	0	0	0	0	1	1	4	1
Texas A&M-Corpus Christi	0	0	0	0	0	0	0	0	5	0
WP: Bond, M. (11–9) LP: Cecchetti, G. (8–5) Sv: None

==== Game 4 (Texas State vs Texas-Arlington) ====
May 12, 2011 10:03 pm CDT at Bearkat Softball Complex, Huntsville, TX
Team	1	2	3	4	5	6	7	R	H	E
Texas State	0	0	3	0	0	0	3	6	10	0
Texas-Arlington	0	0	0	0	0	0	1	1	3	1
WP: Taylor, A. (16–5) LP: Collins, C. (-) Sv: None; Attendance: 421

=== Day Two ===
==== Game 5 (Texas A&M-Corpus Christi vs Northwestern State) ====
May 13, 2011 11:55 am CDT at Bearkat Softball Complex, Huntsville, TX
Team	1	2	3	4	5	6	7	R	H	E
Texas A&M-Corpus Christi	0	0	0	0	1	3	1	5	6	1
Northwestern State	0	1	0	0	0	0	0	1	3	2
WP: Trujillo, J. (15–7) LP: Roos, K. (12–7) Sv: None

==== Game 6 (Texas-Arlington vs UTSA) ====
May 13, 2011 2:22 pm CDT at Bearkat Softball Complex, Huntsville, TX
Team	1	2	3	4	5	6	7	R	H	E
Texas-Arlington	1	0	0	0	0	2	0	3	10	5
UTSA	0	0	1	0	2	0	1	4	11	4
WP: Humpal, E. (11–5) LP: Lyles, T. (16–15) Sv: None

==== Game 7 (McNeese State vs Texas State) ====
May 13, 2011 5:47 pm CDT at Bearkat Softball Complex, Huntsville, TX
Team	1	2	3	4	5	6	7	R	H	E
McNeese State	0	0	1	0	0	0	0	1	4	0
Texas State	0	1	0	0	0	1	0	2	9	1
WP: Taylor, A. (17–5) LP: Shepherd, K. (19–17) Sv: None

==== Semi-final Game One (UTSA vs Texas A&M-Corpus Christi) ====
May 13, 2011 8:45 pm CDT at Bearkat Softball Complex, Huntsville, TX
Team	1	2	3	4	5	6	7	R	H	E
UTSA	0	0	0	3	0	2	0	5	8	1
Texas A&M-Corpus Christi	1	0	0	4	0	0	1	6	11	0
WP: Trujillo, J. (15–7) LP: Staton, H. (6–8) Sv: None; Attendance: 518

=== Day Three ===
==== Semi-final Game Two (Texas A&M-Corpus Christi vs McNeese State) ====
May 14, 2011 10:30 am CDT at Bearkat Softball Complex, Huntsville, TX
Team	1	2	3	4	5	6	7	R	H	E
Texas A&M-Corpus Christi	1	0	3	0	0	0	4	8	9	0
McNeese State	0	0	0	1	2	2	1	6	8	3
WP: Trujillo, J. (17–7) LP: Bond, M. (11–10) Sv: None

==== Championship Game (Texas State vs Texas A&M-Corpus Christi) ====
May 14, 2011 2:00 pm CDT at Bearkat Softball Complex, Huntsville, TX
Team	1	2	3	4	5	6	7	R	H	E
Texas State	0	0	0	0	5	3	0	8	10	1
Texas A&M-Corpus Christi	1	0	2	0	0	2	0	5	8	3
WP: Hall, C. (14–15) LP: Cecchetti, G. (8–6) Sv: None; Attendance: 488

== Awards and honors ==
Tournament MVP: Chandler Hall - Texas State

All-Tournament Teams:

- Jenna Emery - Texas State
- McKensie Baak - Texas State
- Haley Lemons - Texas State
- Anne Marie Taylor - Texas State
- Caley Jeter - Texas A&M-Corpus Christi
- Brittany Tucker - Texas A&M-Corpus Christi
- Jordan Trujillo - Texas A&M-Corpus Christi
- Molly Guidry - McNeese State
- Stacey Conley - McNeese State
- Kristin Kappler - UTSA

== See also ==
2011 Southland Conference baseball tournament
