= 2014 Southland Conference softball tournament =

- Teams: 6
- Format: Double-elimination tournament
- Finals site: North Oak Park; Hammond, Louisiana
- Champions: Northwestern State (5 title)
- Winning coach: Donald Pickett (2 title)
- MVP: Kaylee Guidry (Northwestern State)

The 2014 Southland Conference tournament was held at North Oak Park on the campus of Southeastern Louisiana University in Hammond, Louisiana, from May 8 through 11, 2014. The tournament winner, Northwestern State earned the Southland Conference's automatic bid to the 2014 NCAA Division I softball tournament. Due to weather delays, the championship broadcast on ESPN3 was canceled, leaving the entire tournament to air on the Southland Digital Network. Southland Conference assistant commissioner Chris Mycoskie and former Southeastern Louisiana pitcher Kati Morse called the action.

== Format ==
The top 6 teams qualified for the Southland softball tournament. Abilene Christian and Incarnate Word were currently ineligible due to their transition from D2 to D1. Had either of the two teams been in the top 6 spots, the seventh and if necessary eighth teams would have qualified for the tournament and would have taken their respective spots.

2014 Southland Conference softball standings
	Conf.						Overall
Team	W		L		PCT		W	L		PCT
McNeese State ** ‍‍‍	20	–	6	–	0	.769		40	–	17	–	0	.702
Northwestern State ‡ ‍‍‍	15	–	10	–	0	.600		30	–	22	–	0	.577
Sam Houston ‍‍‍	15	–	11	–	0	.577		27	–	27	–	0	.500
Stephen F. Austin ‍‍‍	14	–	11	–	0	.560		26	–	27	–	0	.491
Houston Baptist ‍‍‍	14	–	13	–	0	.519		22	–	28	–	0	.440
Central Arkansas ‍‍‍	13	–	13	–	0	.500		25	–	34	–	0	.424
Abilene Christian* ‍‍‍	10	–	10	–	0	.500		21	–	28	–	0	.429
Lamar ‍‍‍	12	–	14	–	0	.462		20	–	30	–	0	.400
Texas A&M–Corpus Christi ‍‍‍	11	–	15	–	0	.423		16	–	36	–	0	.308
Southeastern Louisiana ‍‍‍	10	–	17	–	0	.370		19	–	29	–	0	.396
Nicholls ‍‍‍	9	–	16	–	0	.360		19	–	34	–	0	.358
Incarnate Word* ‍‍‍	7	–	14	–	0	.333		21	–	31	–	0	.404
‡ – SLC Tournament Champion *ineligible for postseason play due to Div. I transition **Southland Tournament #1 seed champion As of May 4, 2014; Rankings from USA Today/NFCA Coaches

== Tournament ==
Upper round 1
4	Stephen F. Austin	7
5	Houston Baptist	8
3	Sam Houston State	0
6	Central Arkansas	1
Lower round 1
3	Sam Houston State	6
5	Houston Baptist	1
4	Stephen F. Austin	5
6	Central Arkansas	0

Upper round 2
1	McNeese State	5
5	Houston Baptist	0
2	Northwestern State	5
3	Central Arkansas	3
Lower round 2
3	Sam Houston State	6
4	Stephen F. Austin	8

Upper final
1	McNeese State	2
2	Northwestern State	3
Lower final
1	McNeese State	9
4	Stephen F. Austin	0

Final
2	Northwestern State	11
1	McNeese State	0

- All times listed are Central Daylight Time.

== Line Scores ==
=== Day One ===
==== Game 1 (Houston Baptist vs Stephen F. Austin) ====
May 8, 2014 11:00 am CDT at North Oak Park, Hammond, LA
Team	1	2	3	4	5	6	7	R	H	E
Houston Baptist	0	0	3	0	5	0	0	8	10	3
Stephen F. Austin	2	2	0	0	1	0	2	7	9	3
WP: Stiefel, K. (6–10) LP: Thomas, C. (16–10) Sv: None

==== Game 2 (Central Arkansas vs Sam Houston State) ====
May 8, 2014 2:10 pm CDT at North Oak Park, Hammond, LA
Team	1	2	3	4	5	6	7	R	H	E
Central Arkansas	0	0	0	0	1	0	0	1	6	0
Sam Houston State	1	0	0	0	0	0	0	0	4	1
WP: Studioso, K. (17–11) LP: Lancaster, S. (10–10) Sv: None

==== Game 3 (Houston Baptist vs McNeese State) ====
May 8, 2014 4:25 pm CDT at North Oak Park, Hammond, LA
Team	1	2	3	4	5	6	7	R	H	E
Houston Baptist	0	0	0	0	0	0	0	0	5	2
McNeese State	0	1	0	0	3	1	0	5	8	0
WP: Allred (26–7) LP: O'Conner, S. (8–7) Sv: None

==== Game 4 (Central Arkansas vs Northwestern State) ====
May 8, 2014 6:45 pm CDT at North Oak Park, Hammond, LA
Team	1	2	3	4	5	6	7	R	H	E
Central Arkansas	1	0	0	0	0	2	0	3	5	1
Northwestern State	0	0	0	2	1	2	0	5	6	1
WP: Gray, B. (7–5) LP: Studioso, K. (17–12) Sv: None; Attendance: 550

=== Day Two ===
==== Game 5 (Sam Houston State vs Houston Baptist) ====
May 10, 2014 11:00 am CDT at North Oak Park, Hammond, LA
Team	1	2	3	4	5	6	7	R	H	E
Sam Houston State	3	0	0	1	1	1	0	6	11	1
Houston Baptist	1	0	0	0	0	0	0	1	4	1
WP: Lancaster, S. (11–10) LP: O'Conner, S. (8–8) Sv: None

==== Game 6 (Stephen F. Austin vs Central Arkansas) ====
May 10, 2014 1:15 pm CDT at North Oak Park, Hammond, LA
Team	1	2	3	4	5	6	7	R	H	E
Stephen F. Austin	0	0	2	1	0	0	2	5	10	1
Central Arkansas	0	0	0	0	0	0	0	0	2	3
WP: Thomas, C. (17–14) LP: Studioso, K. (17–13) Sv: None

==== Game 7 (McNeese State vs Northwestern State) ====
May 10, 2014 3:35 pm CDT at North Oak Park, Hammond, LA
Team	1	2	3	4	5	6	7	R	H	E
McNeese State	0	0	0	2	0	0	0	2	3	3
Northwestern State	0	0	2	0	0	0	1	3	5	1
WP: Guidry, K. (11–3) LP: Smith (8–5) Sv: None

==== Semi-final Game One (Stephen F. Austin vs Sam Houston State) ====
May 10, 2014 6:00 pm CDT at North Oak Park, Hammond, LA
Team	1	2	3	4	5	6	7	R	H	E
Stephen F. Austin	1	0	3	0	0	1	3	8	10	3
Sam Houston State	0	0	2	1	2	0	1	6	8	2
WP: Thomas, C. (17–14) LP: Lancaster, S. (11–11) Sv: Nonve; Attendance: 539

==== Semi-final Game Two (McNeese State vs Stephen F. Austin) ====
May 10, 2014 9:40 pm CDT at North Oak Park, Hammond, LA
Team	1	2	3	4	5	6	7	R	H	E
McNeese State	1	4	0	4	0	0	0	9	9	0
Stephen F. Austin	0	0	0	0	0	0	0	0	2	3
WP: Allred (27–7) LP: Lewis, B. (7–10) Sv: None; Attendance: 539

=== Day Three ===
==== Championship Game (Northwestern State vs McNeese State) ====
May 11, 2014 8:00 am CDT at North Oak Park, Hammond, LA
Team	1	2	3	4	5	R	H	E
Northwestern State	2	1	5	0	3	11	14	0
McNeese State	0	0	0	0	0	0	2	1
WP: Guidry, K. (12–3) LP: Allred (27–8) Sv: None; Attendance: 318

== Awards and honors ==
Tournament MVP: Kaylee Guidry – Northwestern State All-Tournament Teams:

- Tiffany Castillo – Sam Houston State
- Shalie Day – Stephen F. Austin
- Carlie Thomas – Stephen F. Austin
- Alanna DiVittorio – McNeese State
- Marissa Taunton – McNeese State
- Ashley Modzelewski – McNeese State
- Lauren Wagner – McNeese State
- Jamie Allred – McNeese State
- Shenequia Abby – Northwestern State
- Cali Burke – Northwestern State
- Tara McKenney – Northwestern State
- Kaylee Guidry – Northwestern State

== See also ==
- 2014 Southland Conference baseball tournament
