= Amy Hooks =

American college softball coach & former catcher (born 1988)

Current position
- Title: Head coach
- Team: Lamar
- Conference: Southland
- Record: 128–213 (.375)

Biographical details
- Born: November 19, 1988 (age 36); Dallas, Texas, U.S.

Playing career

Softball
- 2008–2011: Texas
- 2012: Carolina Diamonds
- 2013: NY/NJ Comets
- Position(s): Catcher

Coaching career (HC unless noted)

Softball
- 2013–2018: Northwestern State (asst.)
- 2018–present: Lamar

Head coaching record
- Overall: 128–213 (.375)

Accomplishments and honors

Awards
- Big 12 Player of the Year (2011); Easton second-team All-American (2011); Second-team All-Big 12 (2010)

Amy Deanne Hooks (born November 19, 1988) is an American college softball coach and former catcher who is the current head coach at Lamar. Prior to her position at Lamar, she served as assistant softball coach for six seasons at Northwestern State.

== Playing career ==
=== High school ===
Born in Dallas and raised in Mesquite, Texas, Hooks played varsity softball and volleyball at North Mesquite High School. In softball, she earned several awards including being named as an All-District first team player in District 12-5A three times. She was named District 12-5A Offensive player of the year twice (2004 and 2006) and District 12-5A Defensive player of the year once (2003). In volleyball, she was named to the All-District 12-5A first team and was named to the State All-Academic team in 2006.

=== College ===
Hooks played softball for the Texas Longhorns softball team from 2008-2011. At the conclusion of the 2011 season, Hooks was named Big 12 Conference Player of the Year and was named to the Big 12 All-Conference first-team. She was also named to the Big 12 All-Conference second team in 2010 and to the Big 12 Academic All-Conference second team in 2009. She was twice named as Big 12 Player of the week (February 24, 2009 and April 12, 2011). She was named to the Easton All-America second team and NFCA All Central Region second team in 2011. She held the team record for season home runs at 36 until the 2011 season.

=== Professional ===
Hooks played in the National Pro Fastpitch league with the Carolina Diamonds in 2012 and the NY/NJ Comets in 2013.

== Coaching career ==
=== Assistant coach ===
Hooks served as assistant coach for 6 years (2013–2018) for the Northwestern State Lady Demons softball team. While at Northwestern State, the Lady Demons won the 2015 regular season Southland Conference championship. The Lady Demons also won the 2013 and 2014 Southland Conference softball tournament and appeared in the NCAA Division I softball tournament both years.

=== Lamar ===
Hooks was named head coach for the Lamar Lady Cardinals softball team on June 20, 2018.

== Head coaching record ==
Statistics overview
Season	Team	Overall	Conference	Standing	Postseason
Lamar Lady Cardinals (Southland Conference) (2019–2021)
2019	Lamar	23–34	14–13	7th	
2020	Lamar	9–12	0–3	Season cancelled after 3 conference games due to COVID19	
2021	Lamar	8–43	4–23	12th	
Lamar Lady Cardinals (Western Athletic Conference) (2022–2022)
2022	Lamar	11–38	5–19	5th (Southwest Division)	
Lamar Lady Cardinals (Southland Conference) (2023–present)
2023	Lamar	22–34	12–12	4th	
2024	Lamar	26–25	12–12	5th	
2025	Lamar	29–27	15–12	5th	
Lamar:		128–213 (.375)	62–94 (.397)		
Total:		128–213 (.375)			
National champion Postseason invitational champion Conference regular season champion Conference regular season and conference tournament champion Division regular season champion Division regular season and conference tournament champion Conference tournament champion

== See also ==
- Lamar Cardinals and Lady Cardinals
- Lamar Lady Cardinals softball
