= Joanna Hardin =

American softball coach

Current position
- Title: Head coach
- Team: Virginia
- Conference: ACC
- Record: 173–217 (.444)

Biographical details
- Born: Fullerton, California, U.S.
- Education: Biola University; Liberty University

Playing career
- 2002–2005: Biola

Coaching career (HC unless noted)
- 2005–2007: Whittier Christian HS
- 2007–2009: Liberty (asst.)
- 2010–2012: Jefferson Forest HS
- 2013–2014: McNeese State (asst.)
- 2015–2016: McNeese State
- 2017–present: Virginia

Head coaching record
- Overall: 252–251 (.501)
- Tournaments: NCAA: 3–4 (.429)

Accomplishments and honors

Championships
- Southland Regular Season Champions (2016); Southland Tournament Champions (2016); Southland East Division Champions (2016)

Joanna Hardin is an American softball coach who is the current head coach of the Virginia Cavaliers softball team.

== Coaching career ==
=== McNeese State ===
On June 5, 2014, Joanna Hardin was named the head coach of the McNeese State softball program, replacing Mike Smith who left to be the head coach at Ole Miss.

=== Virginia ===
On June 10, 2016, Joanna Hardin was announced as the new head coach of the Virginia softball program.

2024 proved Hardin's most successful season at Virginia. The Cavaliers finished the season 34-20 overall and 15-9 in the ACC, tying the Cavaliers for 4th in the conference. In-season highlights included a first ever series win against #11 Clemson and a series win at 3rd-ranked and eventual ACC champion and WCWS participant Duke. The Cavaliers qualified for the NCAA Tournament for the first time since 2010, receiving the regional 2 seed in Knoxville, going 2-2 with wins over Miami (Ohio) and losses to #3 National seed Tennessee.

== Head coaching record ==
=== College ===
Record table
Season	Team	Overall	Conference	Standing	Postseason
McNeese State Cowgirls (Southland Conference) (2015–2016)
2015	McNeese State	36–20	21–5	2nd (East)	
2016	McNeese State	43–14	23–4	1st (East)	NCAA Regional
McNeese State:		79–34 (.699)	44–9 (.830)		
Virginia Cavaliers (Atlantic Coast Conference) (2017–Present)
2017	Virginia	22–32	9–15	8th	
2018	Virginia	12–41	3–21	6th (Coastal)	
2019	Virginia	22–31	8–16	5th (Coastal)	
2020	Virginia	10–12	0–6	14th	Season canceled due to COVID-19
2021	Virginia	15–33	10–27	12th	
2022	Virginia	28–26	13–11	6th	NISC Tournament
2023	Virginia	30–22	8–16	8th	
2024	Virginia	34–20	15–9	4th	NCAA Regional
2025	Virginia	37–17	14–10	7th	NCAA Regional
2026	Virginia	38–12	13–10	6th	
Virginia:		248–246 (.502)	93–141 (.397)		
Total:		327–280 (.539)			
National champion Postseason invitational champion Conference regular season champion Conference regular season and conference tournament champion Division regular season champion Division regular season and conference tournament champion Conference tournament champion
