= Virginia Cavaliers softball =

- 2025 Virginia Cavaliers softball team
- Founded: 1980
- University: University of Virginia
- Athletic director: Carla Williams
- Head coach: Joanna Hardin (10th season)
- Conference: ACC
- Location: Charlottesville, Virginia
- Home stadium: Palmer Park
- Nickname: Cavaliers
- Colors: Orange and blue

NCAA Tournament appearances
- 2010, 2024, 2025, 2026

Conference tournament championships
- 1994

The Virginia Cavaliers softball team represents University of Virginia in NCAA Division I college softball. The team participates in the Atlantic Coast Conference. The Cavaliers are currently led by head coach Joanna Hardin. The team plays its home games at Palmer Park on the university's Charlottesville campus.

== History ==
Virginia has played softball continuously since 1980, beginning NCAA play in 1982 when the organization began sponsoring the sport. The Cavaliers currently play their home games at Palmer Park, an on-campus stadium that opened in 2020.

The Cavaliers have been members of the Atlantic Coast Conference through their softball history, winning the 1994 ACC Tournament. They have qualified for the NCAA tournament three in program history, most recently in 2025.

Virginia has been led by head coach Joanna Hardin since 2017.

== NCAA Tournament Appearances ==
The Cavaliers have qualified for the NCAA tournament three times, most recently in 2025.

Year	Record	Pct	Notes
2010	1–2	.333	Knoxville Regional
2024	2–2	.500	Knoxville Regional
2025	1–2	.333	Columbia Regional
2026	2–2	.500	Knoxville Regional
TOTALS	6–8	.429	

== Championships ==
=== Conference Tournament Championships ===
Year	Conference	Tournament Location	Head coach
1994	Atlantic Coast Conference	Tallahassee, FL	Peggy Kellers

== Coaching history ==
=== 2026 coaching staff ===
Name	Position coached	Consecutive season at Virginia in current position
Joanna Hardin	Head coach	10th
Jeff Tylka	Associate Head Coach	3rd
Jamie Allred-Stoker	Assistant coach	3rd
Dee Dee Hernandez	Assistant coach	1st
Caty Reeves	Director of Operations	1st

=== Previous head coaches ===
Years	Coach	Record	%
1980–1981	Mika Long	47–33	.588
1982–1983	C.L. Ermini	41–30	.577
1984–1986	Sue Ross	81–80	.503
1987–1992	Terry DeTuro	184–102–1	.643
1993–1997	Peggy Kellers	124–96	.564
1998–2005	Cheryl Sprangel	303–215	.585
2006–2007	Karen Johns	46–65	.414
2008–2013	Eileen Schmidt	145–168	.463
2014–2016	Blake Miller	42–116	.266
Since 2017	Joanna Hardin	210–234	.473

== Awards and honors ==
=== Retired numbers ===
No.	Player	Position	Career	Year retired
21	Kristen Dennis	P	1999-2002	2005
22	Lisa Palmer	P	1986–1989	1990

=== Conference awards and honors ===
==== ACC Player of the Year ====
- Eileen Schmidt, 1993
- Kristen Dennis, 2002
- Sara Larquier, 2005

==== ACC Freshman of the Year ====
- Kristen Dennis, 1999
- Ruby Rojas, 2000
