= 1983 Southland Conference softball tournament =

- Teams: 6
- Format: Double-elimination tournament
- Finals site: Beaumont Athletic Complex; Beaumont, Texas
- Champions: McNeese State (1st title)
- Winning coach: Vicky Chapman (1 title)

1983 Southland Conference softball standings
	Conf.						Overall
Team	W		L		T	PCT	W		L		T	PCT
North Zone
Texas–Arlington ^{x}‍‍‍	5	–	1	–	0	.833	39	–	19	–	0	.672
Northeast Louisiana ‍‍‍	3	–	1	–	0	.750	9	–	18	–	0	.333
Arkansas State ‍‍‍	0	–	6	–	0	.000	5	–	9	–	0	.357
South Zone
Southwestern Louisiana ^{x}‍‍‍	6	–	2	–	0	.750	22	–	13	–	0	.629
McNeese State ‍‍‡‍	5	–	3	–	0	.625	19	–	18	–	0	.514
Lamar ‍‍‍	1	–	7	–	0	.125	5	–	40	–	0	.111
x – Division champion ‡ – Tournament champion As of May 20, 1983; Rankings from Coaches' Poll

The 1983 Southland Conference tournament was held at the Beaumont Athletic Complex in Beaumont, Texas The tournament was the conference's first. McNeese State won the six team tournament. McNeese State's season ended with the tournament championship as the Cowgirls were not one of the eight teams selected to the compete in the 1983 NCAA Division I softball tournament.

== Format ==
The tournament was a 6 team double elimination format. All teams which competed in conference play were members of the tournament field. North and South Zone division winners, Texas-Arlington and Southwestern Louisiana respectively, received byes in first round competition.

== Tournament ==
Round	Game	Matchup	Score	Notes
First round
1	1	McNeese State vs. Arkansas State	13–6	McNeese State wins
1	2	Lamar vs. Northeast Louisiana	4–2	Lamar wins
Winner's Bracket
2	3	McNeese State vs. Texas-Arlington	4–1	McNeese State wins
2	4	Southwestern Louisiana vs. Lamar	3–2	Southwestern Louisiana wins
Consolation Bracket
2	5	Lamar vs. Arkansas State	8–4	Arkansas State eliminated
2	6	Texas-Arlington vs. Northeast Louisiana	3–0	Northeast Louisiana eliminated
2	7	Texas-Arlington vs. Lamar	1–0	Lamar eliminated
Semifinals
3	8	McNeese State vs. Southwestern Louisiana	2–0	McNeese State wins
3	9	Texas-Arlington vs. Southwestern Louisiana	6–3	Southwestern Louisiana eliminated
Championship
4	10	McNeese State vs. Texas-Arlington	4–3	McNeese State wins championship
