= 2011 Southland Conference baseball tournament =

- Teams: 8
- Format: Double-elimination
- Finals site: Bobcat Ballpark; San Marcos, Texas
- Champions: Texas State (4th title)
- Winning coach: Ty Harrington (3rd title)
- MVP: Casey Kalenkosky (Texas State)

2011 Southland Conference baseball standings
| | Conf. | | | | | | Overall |
| Team | W | | L | | T | PCT | W | | L | | T | PCT |
|---|---|---|---|---|---|---|---|---|---|---|---|---|
| Texas State ‍†‍‡‍^{y} | 24 | – | 9 | – | 0 | .727 | 41 | – | 23 | – | 0 | .641 |
| Stephen F. Austin ‍‍‍ | 20 | – | 13 | – | 0 | .606 | 37 | – | 23 | – | 0 | .617 |
| Texas A&M–Corpus Christi ‍‍‍ | 19 | – | 14 | – | 0 | .576 | 37 | – | 24 | – | 0 | .607 |
| Southeastern Louisiana ‍‍‍ | 18 | – | 14 | – | 0 | .563 | 35 | – | 22 | – | 0 | .614 |
| Sam Houston State ‍‍‍ | 17 | – | 16 | – | 0 | .515 | 35 | – | 24 | – | 0 | .593 |
| Texas–San Antonio ‍‍‍ | 16 | – | 17 | – | 0 | .485 | 27 | – | 32 | – | 0 | .458 |
| Lamar ‍‍‍ | 15 | – | 18 | – | 0 | .455 | 29 | – | 27 | – | 0 | .518 |
| Nicholls State ‍‍‍ | 15 | – | 18 | – | 0 | .455 | 28 | – | 29 | – | 0 | .491 |
| Texas–Arlington ‍‍‍ | 15 | – | 18 | – | 0 | .455 | 27 | – | 29 | – | 0 | .482 |
| McNeese State ‍‍‍ | 14 | – | 19 | – | 0 | .424 | 26 | – | 30 | – | 0 | .464 |
| Central Arkansas ‍‍‍ | 13 | – | 20 | – | 0 | .394 | 24 | – | 29 | – | 0 | .453 |
| Northwestern State ‍‍‍ | 11 | – | 21 | – | 0 | .344 | 22 | – | 32 | – | 0 | .407 |
† – Conference champion ‡ – Tournament champion y – Invited to the NCAA tournament As of May 29, 2011; Rankings from Collegiate Baseball

The 2011 Southland Conference baseball tournament was held from May 25 through 28. The top eight regular-season finishers of the league's twelve teams met in the double-elimination tournament held at Bobcat Ballpark in San Marcos, Texas. The winner of the tournament, Texas State, earned the conference's automatic bid to the 2011 NCAA Division I baseball tournament.

== Seeding and format ==
The top eight finishers from the regular season were seeded one through eight. They played a two bracket, double-elimination tournament, with the winner of each bracket meeting in a single championship final.

| Team | W | L | T | Pct | Seed |
|---|---|---|---|---|---|
| Texas State | 24 | 9 | 0 | .727 | 1 |
| Stephen F. Austin | 20 | 13 | 0 | .606 | 2 |
| Texas A&M–Corpus Christi | 19 | 14 | 0 | .576 | 3 |
| Southeastern Louisiana | 18 | 14 | 0 | .563 | 4 |
| Sam Houston State | 17 | 16 | 0 | .515 | 5 |
| Texas–San Antonio | 16 | 17 | 0 | .485 | 6 |
| Lamar | 15 | 18 | 0 | .455 | 7 |
| Nicholls State | 15 | 18 | 0 | .455 | 8 |
| Texas–Arlington | 15 | 18 | 0 | .455 | – |
| McNeese State | 14 | 19 | 0 | .424 | – |
| Central Arkansas | 13 | 20 | 0 | .394 | – |
| Northwestern State | 11 | 21 | 0 | .344 | – |

== Results ==
First round
1 | Texas State | 0
8 | Nicholls State | 6
4 | Southeastern Louisiana | 0^{7}
5 | Sam Houston State | 12
1 | Texas State | 5
4 | Southeastern Louisiana | 2
3 | Texas A&M–Corpus Christi | 2^{10}
6 | Texas–San Antonio | 3
2 | Stephen F. Austin | 3
7 | Lamar | 2
3 | Texas A&M–Corpus Christi | 4
7 | Lamar | 1

Second round
8 | Nicholls State | 4
5 | Sam Houston State | 1
1 | Texas State | 13
5 | Sam Houston State | 2^{7}
2 | Stephen F. Austin | 7
6 | Texas–San Antonio | 1
6 | Texas–San Antonio | 1
3 | Texas A&M–Corpus Christi | 2

Semifinals
8 | Nicholls | 2 | 7
1 | Texas State | 14 | 10
3 | Texas A&M–Corpus Christi | 11 | 5
2 | Stephen F. Austin | 5 | 6

Final
1 | Texas State | 9
2 | Stephen F. Austin | 0

== All-Tournament Team ==
The following players were named to the All-Tournament Team.

| Pos | Name | Team |
|---|---|---|
| C | Jarid Scarafiotti | Stephen F. Austin |
| 1B | Casey Kalenkosky | Texas State (MVP) |
| 2B | Tyler Sibley | Texas State |
| 3B | Bobby Buckner | Texas A&M–Corpus Christi |
| SS | Christian Gallegos | Texas State |
| OF | Bryson Myles | Stephen F. Austin |
| OF | Luke Plucheck | Sam Houston State |
| OF | Bret Atwood | Texas State |
| DH | Chris Andreas | Sam Houston State |
| P | Todd Simko | Texas A&M–Corpus Christi |
| P | Joseph Dvorsky | Texas State |

== See also ==
2011 Southland Conference softball tournament
