= Mike Smith (softball) =

American softball coach

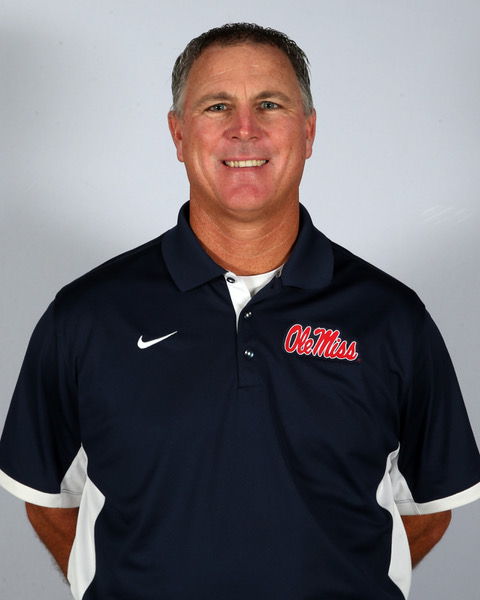

Current position
- Title: Assistant coach
- Team: Union University
- Conference: Gulf South Conference

Biographical details
- Born: San Diego, California, U.S.
- Education: The Master's University

Coaching career (HC unless noted)
- 1999–2002: Biola
- 2003: UC Riverside
- 2004–2011: California Baptist
- 2012–2014: McNeese State
- 2015–2019: Ole Miss
- 2022–2025: California Baptist
- 2025–: Union University (Assistant)

Head coaching record
- Overall: 1012–411 (.711)

Accomplishments and honors

Championships
- NAIA National (2009); 8× Pacific West (2004, 2005, 2006, 2007, 2008, 2009, 2010, 2011); 2× Southland (2013, 2014); SEC Tournament (2017)

Records
- CBU All-Time Winningest Coach

Mike Smith is an American softball coach who is the assistant coach at Union University.

He was the head coach at California Baptist before resigning in April 2025, after a month hiatus from the program. In five years as head coach at Ole Miss, Smith led the team to four NCAA tournament appearances, including two super regional appearances.

Smith was a Western Baseball League Pitcher of the Year with the Mission Viejo (Calif.) team in both 1997 and 1998, and in 2000 was the MVP of the WBL championship series with the St. George team.

== Coaching career ==
=== Ole Miss ===
On May 29, 2014, Mike Smith was announced as head coach at Ole Miss.

On December 8, 2019, Smith resigned as head coach of the Ole Miss softball program after being suspended for not meeting university expectations.

=== Union University ===
Smith was announced as the assistant coach at Union University on August 11, 2025.

== Head coaching record ==
Record table
Season	Team	Overall	Conference	Standing	Postseason
Biola Eagles (Western League) (1999–2002)
1999	Biola	22–23		5th	
2000	Biola	38–19		3rd	
2001	Biola	50–13		1st	
2002	Biola	46–17		2nd	NAIA 10th place
Biola:		156–72 (.684)			
UC Riverside Highlanders (Big West Conference) (2003)
2003	UC Riverside	13–45		7th	
UC Riverside:		13–45 (.224)			
California Baptist Lancers (Pacific West Conference) (2004–2011)
2004	California Baptist	45–15		1st	NAIA 6th place
2005	California Baptist	55–7		1st	NAIA 2nd place
2006	California Baptist	57–7		1st	NAIA 2nd place
2007	California Baptist	59–5	20–1	1st	NAIA 3rd place
2008	California Baptist	60–8	23–1	1st	NAIA 4th place
2009	California Baptist	61–5	20–2	1st	NAIA Champions
2010	California Baptist	64–4	26–1	1st	NAIA 3rd place
2011	California Baptist	66–5	18–2	1st	NAIA 2nd place
California Baptist:		467–56 (.893)	107–7 (.939)		
McNeese State Cowgirls (Southland Conference) (2012–2014)
2012	McNeese State	34–21	12–8	3rd	
2013	McNeese State	38–15	19–5	1st	
2014	McNeese State	40–17	20–6	1st	NCAA Regional
McNeese State:		112–53 (.679)	51–19 (.729)		
Ole Miss Rebels (Southeastern Conference) (2015–2019)
2015	Ole Miss	30–25	6–18	12th	
2016	Ole Miss	41–22	11–13	10th	NCAA Regional
2017	Ole Miss	43–20	10–14	9th	NCAA Super Regional
2018	Ole Miss	32–25	7–17	12th	NCAA Regional
2019	Ole Miss	41–20	13–10	5th	NCAA Super Regional
Ole Miss:		187–112 (.625)	47–72 (.395)		
California Baptist Lancers (Western Athletic Conference) (2022–present)
2022	California Baptist	30–26	12–12	3rd	
2023	California Baptist	28–29	10–14	8th	
2024	California Baptist	30-23	17-7	2nd	
California Baptist:		576–149 (.794)	44–37 (.543)		
Total:		1023–416 (.711)			
National champion Postseason invitational champion Conference regular season champion Conference regular season and conference tournament champion Division regular season champion Division regular season and conference tournament champion Conference tournament champion
