= Farris Field =

Stadium in Conway, Arkansas, U.S.

- Interactive map of Farris Field
- Location: On S Donaghey Avenue north of Dave Ward Drive; Conway, Arkansas
- Coordinates: 35°04′22.3″N 92°27′22.8″W
- Owner: University of Central Arkansas
- Operator: University of Central Arkansas
- Seating type: Bleacher seating: 500; Berm seating: 500
- Capacity: 1,000
- Surface: Infield: Artificial turf Outfield: Grass
- Scoreboard: Electronic
- Record attendance: 507; April 28, 2012 vs Oklahoma
- Field size: Left Field: 200 ft Center Field: 200 ft Right Field: 200 ft (Estimated)

Construction
- Built: 1995-96
- Opened: 1996

Tenant
- Central Arkansas Sugar Bears softball (NCAA) (1996-Present)

Farris Field is the home stadium for the Division I (NCAA) Central Arkansas Sugar Bears softball team. Located next to the Bill Stephens Track/Soccer Complex on the campus of the University of Central Arkansas, the stadium features seating for 1,000 fans. Included in the 1,000 seat capacity is bleacher seating for 500. An outfield grass berm can accommodate an additional 500 fans. The stadium has field lighting, bullpens, dugouts, a press box, and an electronic scoreboard. Beyond the left field fence are locker rooms and batting cages.

== Attendance ==
Below is a list of Farris Field's 10 best-attended games.

Top 10 attendance marks

| Rank | Date | Opponent | Attendance |
|---|---|---|---|
| 1 | April 28, 2012 | Oklahoma | 507 |
| 2 | March 13, 2012 | Texas A&M-Corpus Christi | 489 |
| 3 | March 6, 2012 | Mississippi | 438 |
| 4 | March 10, 2011 | Mississippi | 426 |
| 5 | April 29, 2010 | Mississippi | 394 |
| 6 | March 10, 2006 | Ouachita Baptist | 283 |
| 7 | April 28, 2013 | Lamar | 276 |
| 8 | February 12, 2012 | Louisiana Tech | 272 |
| 9 | April 20, 2013 | Southeastern Louisiana | 269 |
| 10 | March 24, 2012 | Sam Houston State | 252 |

As of the 2013 season.

== Tournaments ==
- AHSCA All-Star Week Softball All-Star games - On June 6, 2012, the Arkansas Activities Association voted to hold all-star events on the campus of Central Arkansas from 2013 to 2017. Farris Field is the home of the softball all-star game.
- UCA Invitational Tournament - Farris Field has been the home of several early season softball tournaments.
