= Lady Demon Diamond =

Sports venue in Natchitoches, Louisiana

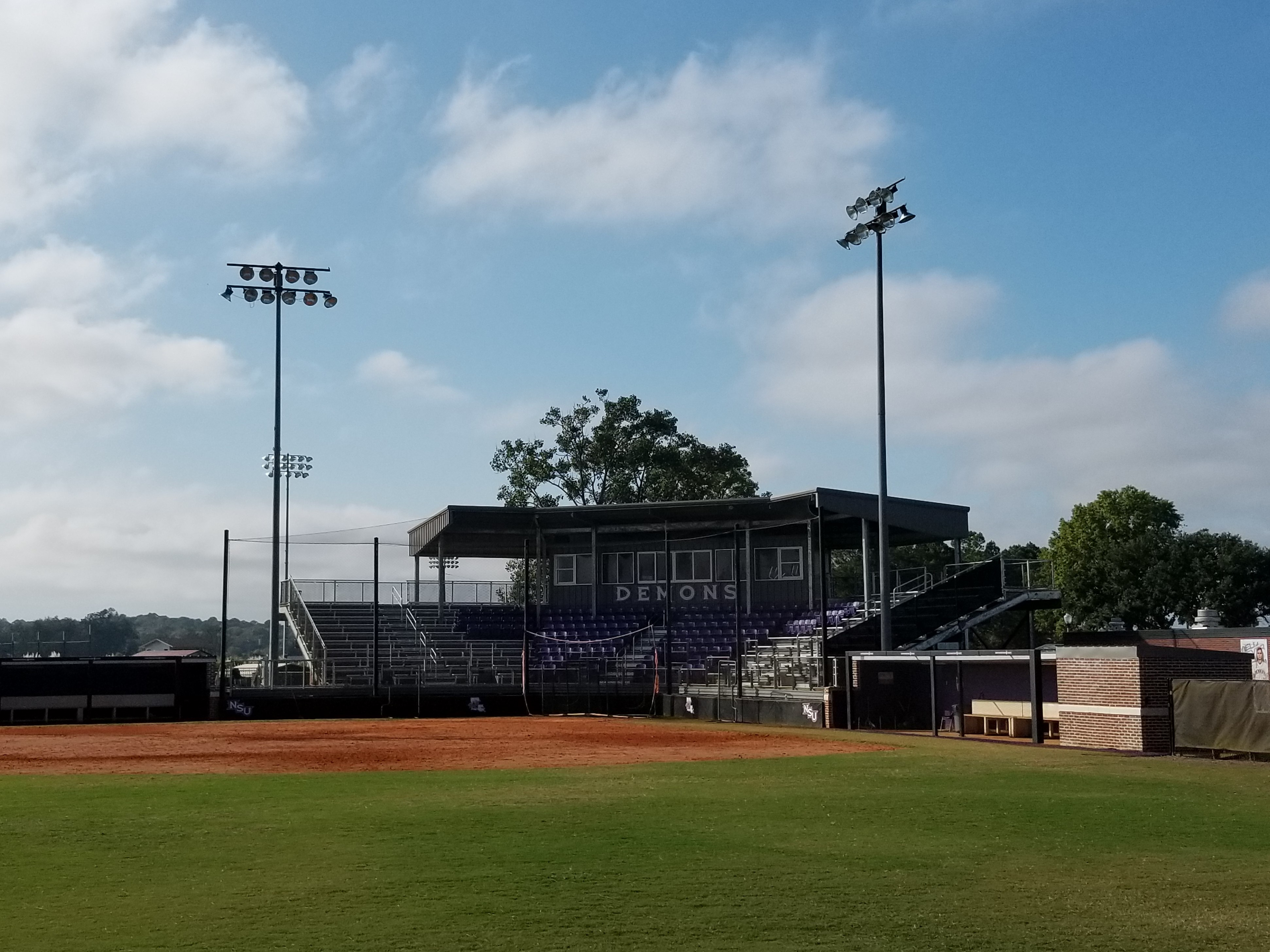
- Interactive map of Lady Demon Diamond
- Location: On Caspari Street; Natchitoches, Louisiana
- Coordinates: 31°44′40″N 93°05′50″W
- Owner: Northwestern State University
- Operator: Northwestern State University
- Seating type: Combination of chairback and bleacher seats
- Capacity: 1,000
- Surface: Grass
- Record attendance: 498; March 4, 2014 vs LSU
- Field size: Left Field: 196 ft Center Field: 218 ft Right Field: 196 ft

Construction
- Renovated: 2007 to 2012

Tenant
- Northwestern State Lady Demons softball (NCAA)

Lady Demon Diamond is the home stadium for the Northwestern State Lady Demons softball team. Located across the street from Prather Coliseum on the campus of Northwestern State University in Natchitoches, Louisiana, the stadium features seating for 1,000 fans. Included in the 1,000 seat capacity is a combination of partially covered chairback and bleacher seats. The Outfield Club, located outside of the left field fence, provides additional bleacher seating. The stadium has field lighting, bullpens, dugouts, and a press box.

== Improvements and expansions ==
The stadium has benefited from numerous renovations over its life. The period from 2007 to 2012 saw a series of improvements including the addition of Outfield Club seating (noted above); a refurbished locker room; new fencing, backstop, and netting; and a new ticket booth. In 2012, a new partially covered grandstand with new chair back seating was part of a $466,000 renovation. New concession stands and press box were also part of the 2012 improvements.

== Post-season tournaments ==
The stadium has been the home of the Southland Conference softball tournament 10 times (1988, 1998, 1999, 2000, 2002, 2003, 2006, 2013, 2015, and 2019).

== Other tournaments ==
The stadium has been the home field for the Natchitoches Historic District Development Commission Lady Demon Classic for several years. The 2021 tournament was set to feature Arkansas–Pine Bluff, Evansville, UT Martin, and Northwestern State prior to its cancellation because of winter storms.
