= Joe Miller Field at Cowgirl Diamond =

Stadium in Lake Charles, Louisiana

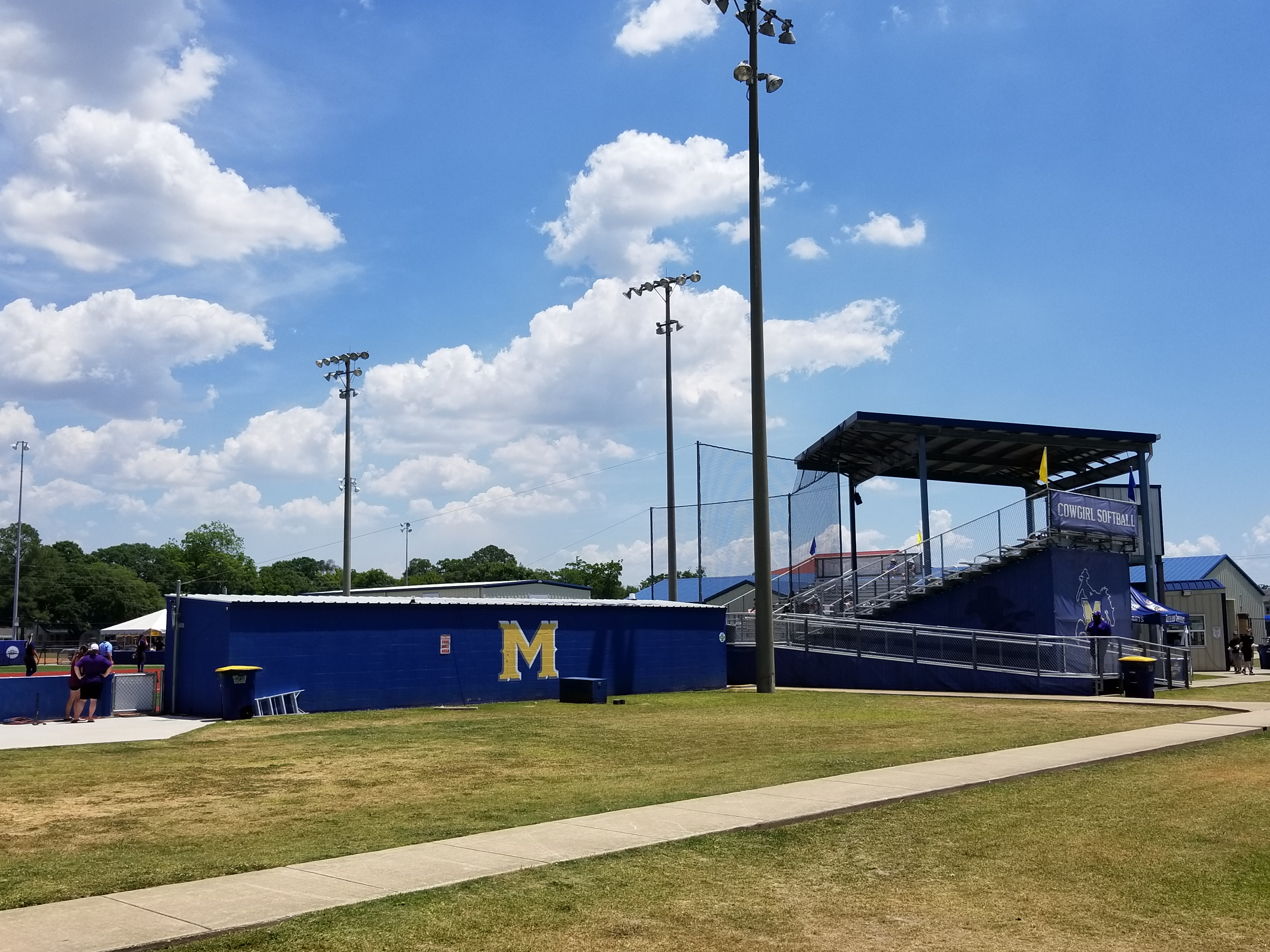
- Interactive map of Joe Miller Field at Cowgirl Diamond
- Location: On Hodges Street north of E Sale Road; Lake Charles, Louisiana
- Coordinates: 30°11′4.7″N 93°12′56.7″W
- Owner: McNeese State University
- Operator: McNeese State University
- Seating type: Bleacher seats
- Capacity: 1,200
- Surface: Turf
- Scoreboard: Daktronics Electronic
- Record attendance: 1,228; April 3, 2018 vs LSU
- Field size: Left Field: 205 ft Center Field: 215 ft Right Field: 205 ft

Construction
- Built: 2002–2003; 23 years ago
- Opened: March 14, 2003

Tenant
- McNeese State Cowgirls softball (NCAA) (2003–Present)

Joe Miller Field at Cowgirl Diamond is the home stadium for the Division I (NCAA) McNeese State Cowgirls softball team. Located on the campus of McNeese State University in Lake Charles, Louisiana, the stadium has a 1,200 seating capacity. Seating consists of partially covered bleacher seating. The stadium has field lighting, bullpens, dugouts, and a press box. An indoor training facility, the "H.I.T" or House of Indoor Training, located outside the right field fence, allows hitting practice in all weather conditions. A Daktronics electronic scoreboard includes a message board. The initial home game was played on March 14, 2003, against the Southern Miss Golden Eagles softball team.

Adjacent to the stadium is the Hodges Street Fieldhouse, a 5,400 sq ft building opened on June 18, 2008, which services both the softball and soccer programs. The building houses coaches offices; separate locker rooms for soccer and softball; a shared training room; and a conference room.

The 2009, 2016, and 2018 Southland Conference softball tournaments were played at Cowgirl Diamond. In 2016 and 2018 the host McNeese Cowgirls won the tournament.

== Attendance ==
Below is a list of Cowgirl Diamond's 10 best-attended games.

Rank	Date	Opponent	Attendance
1	April 15, 2015	LSU	1,054
2	April 17, 2013	LSU	1,035
3	April 21, 2010	LSU	972
4	April 22, 2009	LSU	852
5	March 28, 2007	LSU	847
6	March 15, 2006	LSU	833
7	March 28, 2012	LSU	794
8	May 7, 2009	UTSA	636
9	March 27, 1994	Nicholls	550
10	April 13, 2011	LSU	506

As of the 2018 season.

== Gallery ==
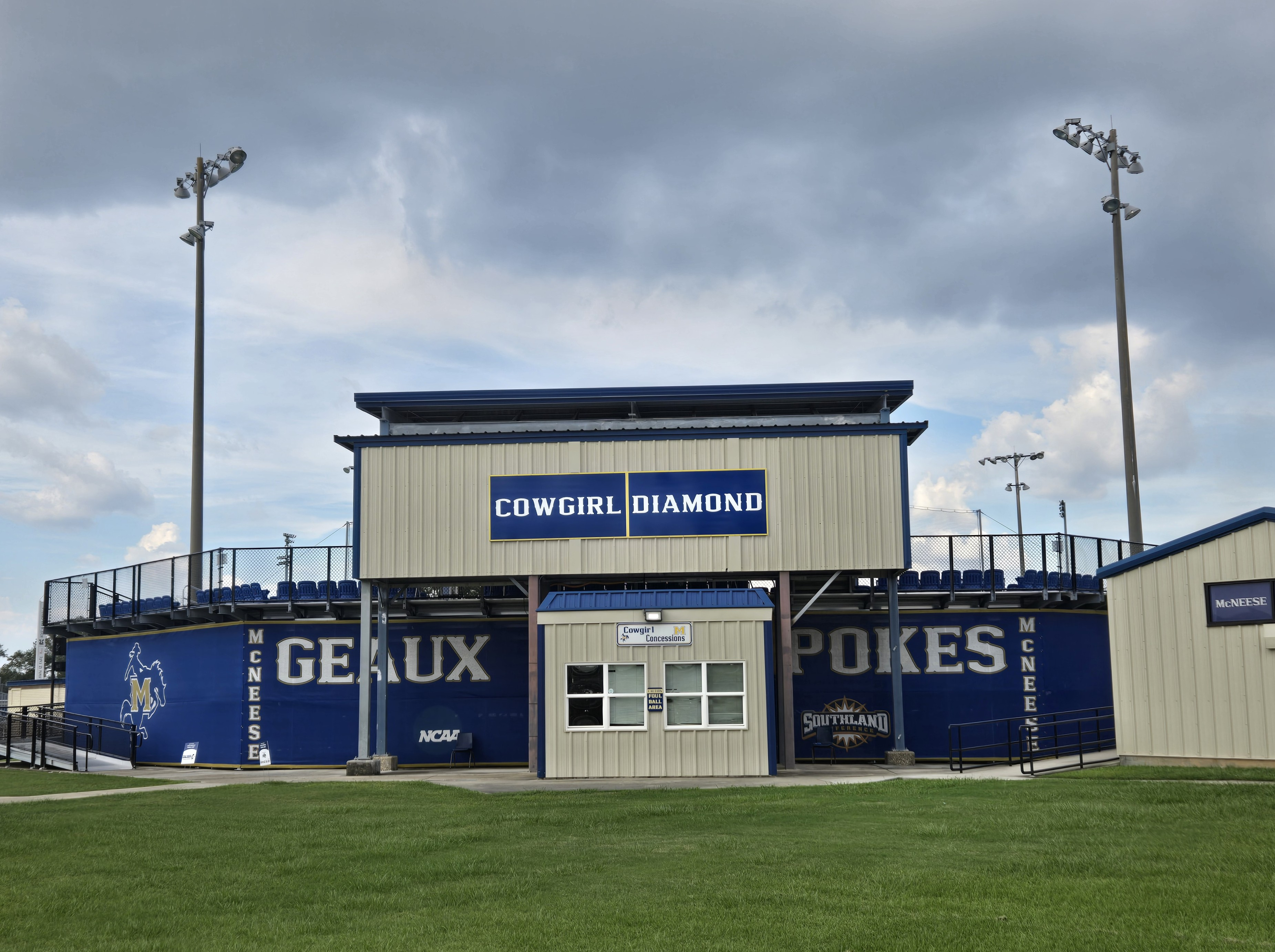
Joe Miller Field at Cowgirl Diamond exterior

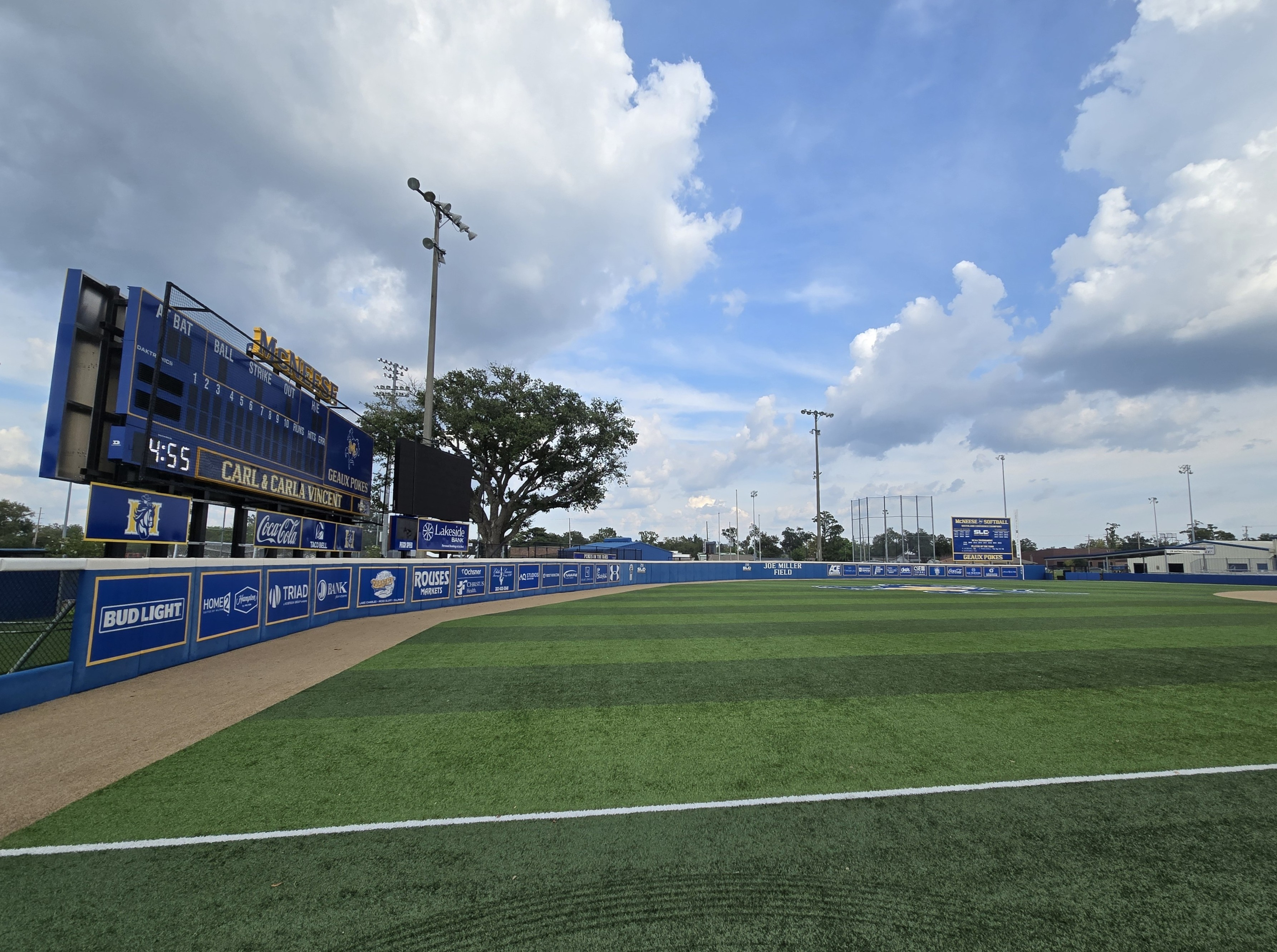
Joe Miller Field at Cowgirl Diamond outfield
