= McNeese Cowgirls softball =

Sports team

McNeese Cowgirls
- 2024 McNeese Cowgirls softball team
- University: McNeese State University
- All-time Record: 1,093–1,087–4
- Head coach: James Landreneau (10th season)
- Conference: Southland
- Location: Lake Charles, Louisiana, US
- Home stadium: Joe Miller Field at Cowgirl Diamond (capacity: 1,200)
- Nickname: Cowgirls
- Colors: Royal blue and gold

NCAA Tournament appearances
- 1994, 2005, 2010, 2016, 2017, 2018, 2021, 2022, 2023, 2026

Conference tournament championships
- 1983, 2005, 2010, 2016, 2017, 2018, 2021, 2022, 2023, 2026

Regular-season conference championships
- 1983, 1994(T), 2013, 2014, 2016, 2017, 2022, 2023, 2024, 2025

The McNeese Cowgirls softball is the team that represents McNeese State University, as they are located in Lake Charles, Louisiana. The Cowgirls are a member of the Southland Conference and participate in NCAA Division I college softball. The team is currently led by their head coach James Landreneau and play home games at Joe Miller Field at Cowgirl Diamond.

== History ==
The first season for McNeese State Cowgirl softball was 1979. The Cowgirls competed as an independent for the first four seasons. The team won the Louisiana championship two of those seasons (1979, 1981). After softball became an NCAA and Southland Conference sponsored sport, the Cowgirls have competed in the conference and at the Division I (NCAA) level. The Cowgirls have won six Southland Conference regular season championships (1983, 1994 (T), 2013, 2014, 2016, 2017) and eight Southland Conference tournament championships (1983, 2005, 2014, 2016, 2017, 2018, 2021, 2026) earning the conference's autobid to the NCAA Division I softball tournament in 2005 2014, 2016, 2017, 2018, 2021 and 2026. The team also competed in the 1994 NCAA tournament as an at-large selection. As of the conclusion of the 2018 season, the Cowgirls have compiled a 1041–1048–4 overall record with an overall conference record of 406–346–3. Erika Piancastelli is McNeese State's first and only All-American. She was named an NFCA All-American in 2016.

== Career coaching records ==
| Coach | Number of seasons | Overall record | Winning percentage |
Coaching records
| Cathy Cunningham | 2 | 28–22 | .560 |
| Jim Draudt | 2 | 59–28 | .678 |
| Vicki Chapman | 1 | 19–18 | .514 |
| Cheryl Manuel | 2 | 43–58 | .426 |
| Cherilyn Lantrip | 2 | 42–38 | .525 |
| Rose Ruffino | 5 | 56–186 | .231 |
| Scott Eastman | 12 | 311–355–4 | .467 |
| Chris Malveaux | 4 | 108–133 | .448 |
| Natalie Poole | 3 | 100–84 | .543 |
| Mike Smith | 3 | 112–53 | .679 |
| Joanna Hardin | 2 | 79–34 | .699 |
| James Landreneau | 4 | 172–100 | .645 |
| Overall | 41 | 1,089–1,095–4 | .496 |

(Records reflect game results through 2021 season.)

== Year-by-year results ==
| Season | Conference | Coach | Overall | | | | Conference | | | | Notes |
| Season | Conference | Coach | Games | Win | Loss | Tie | Games | Win | Loss | Tie | Notes |
NCAA Year-by-Year Results
| 1979 | Independent | Cathy Cunningham | 24 | 16 | 8 | 0 | 0 | 0 | 0 | 0 | Louisiana Champions |
| 1980 | Independent | Cathy Cunningham | 26 | 12 | 14 | 0 | 0 | 0 | 0 | 0 | |
| 1981 | Independent | Jim Draudt | 45 | 33 | 12 | 0 | 0 | 0 | 0 | 0 | Louisiana Champions |
| 1982 | Independent | Jim Draudt | 42 | 26 | 16 | 0 | 0 | 0 | 0 | 0 | |
| 1983 | Southland | Vicky Chapman | 37 | 19 | 18 | 0 | 8 | 5 | 3 | 0 | SLC Regular Season and Tournament champions |
| 1984 | Southland | Cheryl Manuel | 51 | 24 | 27 | 0 | 8 | 5 | 3 | 0 | 2nd |
| 1985 | Southland | Cheryl Manuel | 50 | 19 | 31 | 0 | 12 | 7 | 5 | 0 | 4th |
| 1986 | Southland | Cherilyn Lantrip | 43 | 19 | 24 | 0 | 12 | 6 | 6 | 0 | 3rd |
| 1987 | Southland | Cherilyn Lantrip | 37 | 23 | 14 | 0 | 12 | 8 | 4 | 0 | 3rd |
| 1988 | Southland | Rose Ruffino | 42 | 8 | 34 | 0 | 14 | 3 | 11 | 0 | 6th |
| 1989 | Southland | Rose Ruffino | 54 | 9 | 45 | 0 | 14 | 0 | 14 | 0 | 8th |
| 1990 | Southland | Rose Ruffino | 48 | 10 | 38 | 0 | 15 | 2 | 13 | 0 | 8th |
| 1991 | Southland | Rose Ruffino | 44 | 11 | 33 | 0 | 22 | 5 | 17 | 0 | 6th |
| 1992 | Southland | Rose Ruffino | 54 | 18 | 36 | 0 | 28 | 6 | 22 | 0 | 9th |
| 1993 | Southland | Scott Eastman | 52 | 23 | 28 | 1 | 25 | 12 | 12 | 1 | 4th |
| 1994 | Southland | Scott Eastman | 61 | 35 | 24 | 2 | 30 | 22 | 7 | 1 | SLC Champions; NCAA tournament – 1st round |
| 1995 | Southland | Scott Eastman | 62 | 37 | 25 | 0 | 32 | 22 | 10 | 0 | 3rd |
| 1996 | Southland | Scott Eastman | 53 | 31 | 22 | 0 | 24 | 17 | 7 | 0 | 2nd |
| 1997 | Southland | Scott Eastman | 59 | 32 | 27 | 0 | 23 | 13 | 10 | 0 | 3rd |
| 1998 | Southland | Scott Eastman | 47 | 13 | 34 | 0 | 24 | 7 | 17 | 0 | 9th |
| 1999 | Southland | Scott Eastman | 60 | 26 | 34 | 0 | 25 | 14 | 11 | 0 | 5th |
| 2000 | Southland | Scott Eastman | 60 | 27 | 33 | 0 | 27 | 16 | 11 | 0 | 4(T) |
| 2001 | Southland | Scott Eastman | 53 | 21 | 32 | 0 | 26 | 13 | 13 | 0 | 6th |
| 2002 | Southland | Scott Eastman | 51 | 23 | 28 | 0 | 27 | 17 | 10 | 0 | 4th |
| 2003 | Southland | Scott Eastman | 52 | 24 | 27 | 1 | 27 | 15 | 11 | 1 | 3rd |
| 2004 | Southland | Scott Eastman | 60 | 19 | 41 | 0 | 25 | 8 | 17 | 0 | 9th |
| 2005 | Southland | Chris Malveaux | 69 | 34 | 35 | 0 | 27 | 12 | 15 | 0 | 6th, SLC tournament champions; NCAA regionals |
| 2006 | Southland | Chris Malveaux | 51 | 21 | 30 | 0 | 26 | 13 | 13 | 0 | 4th |
| 2007 | Southland | Chris Malveaux | 62 | 30 | 32 | 0 | 27 | 16 | 11 | 0 | 5th |
| 2008 | Southland | Chris Malveaux | 59 | 23 | 36 | 0 | 29 | 15 | 14 | 0 | 5th |
| 2009 | Southland | Natalie Poole | 59 | 31 | 28 | 0 | 30 | 20 | 10 | 0 | 2nd |
| 2010 | Southland | Natalie Poole | 65 | 38 | 27 | 0 | 30 | 17 | 13 | 0 | 4th, SLC tournament champions; NCAA regionals |
| 2011 | Southland | Natalie Poole | 60 | 31 | 29 | 0 | 30 | 18 | 12 | 0 | 4th |
| 2012 | Southland | Mike Smith | 55 | 34 | 21 | 0 | 20 | 12 | 8 | 0 | 3rd |
| 2013 | Southland | Mike Smith | 53 | 38 | 15 | 0 | 24 | 19 | 5 | 0 | 1st, SLC regular-season champions |
| 2014 | Southland | Mike Smith | 57 | 40 | 17 | 0 | 26 | 20 | 6 | 0 | 1st, SLC regular-season champions |
| 2015 | Southland | Joanna Hardin | 56 | 36 | 20 | 0 | 26 | 21 | 5 | 0 | 2nd |
| 2016 | Southland | Joanna Hardin | 57 | 43 | 14 | 0 | 27 | 23 | 4 | 0 | 1st, SLC regular-season champions; SLC tournament champions; NCAA regionals |
| 2017 | Southland | James Landreneau | 61 | 43 | 18 | 0 | 27 | 24 | 3 | 0 | 1st, SLC regular-season champions; SLC tournament champions; NCAA regionals |
| 2018 | Southland | James Landreneau | 62 | 41 | 21 | 0 | 27 | 18 | 9 | 0 | 2nd; SLC tournament champions; NCAA regionals |
| 2019 | Southland | James Landreneau | 65 | 33 | 32 | 0 | 27 | 19 | 8 | 0 | 3rd; NISC Regionals |
| 2020 | Southland | James Landreneau | 26 | 19 | 7 | 0 | 3 | 3 | 0 | 0 | 2nd (season cancelled due to COVID-19 pandemic) |
| 2021 | Southland | James Landreneau | 58 | 34 | 24 | 0 | 27 | 18 | 9 | 0 | 3rd; NCAA regionals |

== Post-season appearances ==
=== Conference Tournaments ===
| Year | Conference | Record | % | Notes |
Conference softball tournament Results
| 1983 | Southland | 4–0 | 1.000 | Tournament Champion |
| 1984 | Southland | 2–2 | .500 | |
| 1985 | Southland | 0–2 | .000 | |
| 1986 | Southland | 3–2 | .600 | |
| 1987 | Southland | 2–2 | .500 | |
| 1988 | Southland | 0–2 | .000 | |
| 1989 | Southland | 0–2 | .000 | |
| 1990 | Southland | 2–2 | .333 | |
| 1991–1995 | | No Tournament | | |
| 1996 | Southland | 0–2 | .000 | |
| 1997 | Southland | 0–2 | .000 | |
| 1999 | Southland | 3–2 | .600 | |
| 2000 | Southland | 2–2 | .500 | |
| 2001 | Southland | 0–2 | .500 | |
| 2002 | Southland | 0–2 | .500 | |
| 2003 | Southland | 1–2 | .333 | |
| 2005 | Southland | 5–1 | .833 | Tournament Champion |
| 2006 | Southland | 0–2 | .000 | |
| 2007 | Southland | 0–2 | .000 | |
| 2008 | Southland | 1–1 | .500 | |
| 2009 | Southland | 2–2 | .500 | |
| 2010 | Southland | 4–0 | 1.000 | Tournament Champion |
| 2011 | Southland | 2–2 | .500 | |
| 2012 | Southland | 2–2 | .500 | |
| 2013 | Southland | 0–2 | .000 | |
| 2014 | Southland | 2–2 | .500 | |
| 2015 | Southland | 0–2 | .000 | |
| 2016 | Southland | 3–0 | 1.000 | Tournament Champion |
| 2017 | Southland | 3–0 | 1.000 | Tournament Champion |
| 2018 | Southland | 4–0 | 1.000 | Tournament Champion |
| 2019 | Southland | 1–2 | .333 | |
| 2020 | | No Tournament (COVID-19 pandemic) | | |
| 2021 | Southland | 4–0 | 1.000 | Tournament Champion |
| Total | | 52–48 | .520 | 31 appearances |

=== NCAA Division I tournament results ===
The Cowgirls have appeared in six NCAA Division I tournaments. Their record is 5–14.

| Year | Part | Round | Opponent | Result/score |
NCAA Division I tournament results
| 1994 | Regionals No. 4 | First game Second game | Louisiana–Lafayette; Princeton | L 0–3; L 0–2 |
| 2005 | College Station Regionals | First game Second game Third game | Texas A&M; Centenary; Penn State | L 3–6; W 5–2; L 1–2 |
| 2010 | Baton Rouge Regionals | First game Second game | LSU; Texas A&M | L 0–6; L 0–2 |
| 2016 | Baton Rouge Regionals | First game Second game Third game | Arizona State; LSU; Arizona State | W 5–2; L 1–4; L 2–3 (14 inn) |
| 2017 | Baton Rouge Regionals | First game Second game Third game | Louisiana–Lafayette; Fairfield; LSU | L 0–6; W 6–2; L 1–10 (6 inn) |
| 2018 | College Station Regionals | First game Second game Third game | Baylor; Texas A&M; Baylor | W 11–10; L 1–10 (6 inn); L 0–6 |
| 2021 | Baton Rouge Regionals | First game Second game Third game | LSU; George Washington; Louisiana | L 2–10 (6 inn); W 12–0 (5 inn); L 0–4 |

=== NISC Tournament results ===
The Cowgirls have appeared in one NISC tournament. Their record is 3–2.

| Year | Part | Round | Opponent | Result/score |
NISC Tournament Results
| 2019 | Stephen F. Austin Regionals | First game Second game Third game Fourth game Regional championship | Middle Tennessee; UT Arlington; Stephen F. Austin; UT Arlington; UT Arlington | W 7–3; L 3–5; W 3–1; W 6–1; L 3–4 (10 inn) |

== Awards and honors ==
=== Conference awards ===
Southland Conference Player of the Year

- Heather Moreaux 2000
- Alanna DiVittorio 2014
- Erika Piancastelli 2015, 2016, 2017, 2018

Southland Conference Hitter of the Year

- Kerry Riggs 1994
- Heather Moreaux 2000
- Alanna DiVittorio 2014
- Erika Piancastelli 2015, 2016, 2017, 2018

Southland Conference Newcomer of the Year

- Rikki Fontenot 2002
- Christina Allen 2006
- Erika Piancastelli 2015

Southland Conference Pitcher of the Year

- Angella Harrison 1994
- Jamie Allred 2014
- Rachel Smith 2017

Southland Conference Utility Player of the Year

- Jenny Clay 2007, 08

Southland Conference Coach of the Year

- Scott Eastman 1994
- Natalie Poole 2009
- Mike Smith 2013, 2014
- James Landreneau 2017

All Conference First Team

- Tammy Guidry 1983
- Joni Talbot 1987
- Angela Harrison 1994
- Keri Riggs 1994, 1995
- Shyla Sicks 1994
- Kerri Chiasson 1995
- Natalie Poole 1995, 1996, 1997
- Kathy Sturgeon 1995
- Sarah Everingham 1997, 1998
- Heather Moreaux 2000
- Tania Zanet 2000
- Beth Jordan 2002, 2005
- Stephanie Denham 2003
- Brooke Broadhead 2007
- Jenny Clay 2008
- Claire Terracina 2011, 2012
- Ashley Modzelewski 2012, 2013, 2014
- Meagan Bond 2013
- Alanna DiVittorio 2013, 2014
- Jamie Allred 2014
- Erika Piancastelli 2015, 2016, 2017, 2018
- Bryanna Castro 2015
- Lauren Langner 2015
- Hailey Drew 2016
- Morgan Catron 2016, 2018
- Emily Vincent 2016
- Alexandria Saldivar 2017, 2018
- Justyce McClain 2017, 2018, 2019
- Rachel Smith 2017

== See also ==
- List of NCAA Division I softball programs
