= Houston Christian Huskies softball =

Houston Christian Huskies
- 2024 Houston Christian Huskies softball team
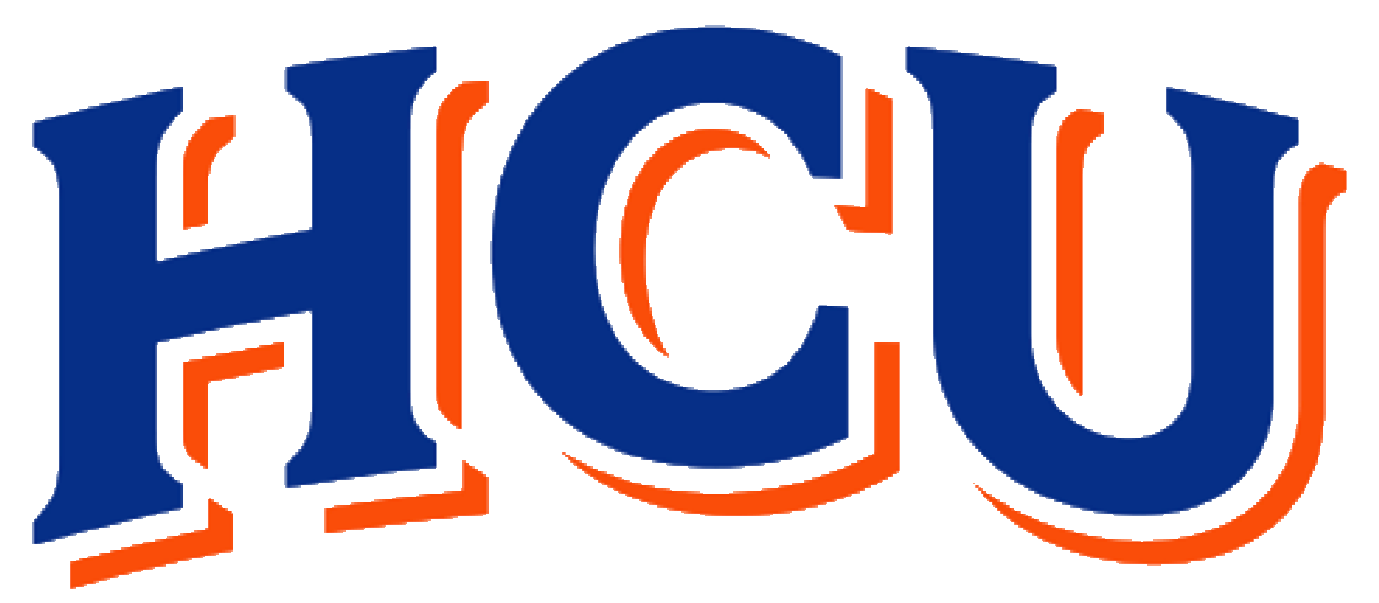
- University: Houston Christian University
- Head coach: Mary–Ellen Hall (24th season)
- Conference: Southland
- Location: Houston, Texas, US
- Home stadium: Husky Field (capacity: 300)
- Nickname: Huskies
- Colors: Royal blue and orange

Conference tournament championships
- Red River Athletic: 1999, 2003, 2004, 2005, 2006, 2007; Great West: 2011

The Houston Christian Huskies softball team, known as the Houston Baptist Huskies until 2022, represents the Houston Christian University, located in Houston, Texas. The Huskies are a member of the Southland Conference and participate in NCAA Division I college softball. The team is currently led by head coach Mary–Ellen Hall and plays home games at Husky Field.

== History ==
The first year of the softball team was 1989 under Dr. Les Sanders who led the Huskies for three seasons finishing with an overall record of 47–75. The current head coach, Mary–Ellen Hall, started in 1992. The 2015 season was her 24th as head coach of the team. As of the conclusion of the 2015 season, the Huskies's record under Hall is 741–440. Overall, the team has an all-time record of 788–513 (.606).

The Huskies competed in NCAA Division I play their initial season, 1989. From 1990 through 2007, the team competed in NAIA Division I play. While an NAIA member, the team was nationally ranked every season from 1996 through the final NAIA season, 2007. Highest final ranking was in 2nd in 2005 when the Huskies finished the season with a 51–5 record.

In 2008, the Huskes moved back to NCAA Division I play competing initially as an independent. Joining the Great West Conference in 2010, the Huskies won the conference championship in 2011. The Huskies started Southland Conference play in 2013.

== Year-by-year results ==
Season	Conference	Coach	Overall				Conference				Notes
Season	Conference	Coach	Games	Win	Loss	Tie	Games	Win	Loss	Tie	Notes
NCAA Independent											
1989	NCAA Independent	Dr. Les Saunders	28	4	24	0	0	0	0	0	
NAIA District IV											
1990	NAIA District IV	Dr. Les Saunders	53	31	22	0	24	20	4	0	2nd in District
1991	NAIA District IV	Dr. Les Saunders	39	12	27	0	18	3	15	0	
1992	NAIA District IV	Mary–Ellen Hall	45	17	26	0	23	9	14	0	
1993	NAIA District IV	Mary–Ellen Hall	40	16	24	0	24	11	13	0	
1994	NAIA District IV	Mary–Ellen Hall	35	19	16	0	24	11	13	0	
NAIA Independent											
1995	NAIA Independent	Mary–Ellen Hall	44	29	15	0	0	0	0	0	SW Region S. Sectional Tournament Champions; SW Regional Tournament Runner-Up
1996	NAIA Independent	Mary–Ellen Hall	49	36	13	0	0	0	0	0	SW Regional Tournament Champions; NAIA National Championship
1997	NAIA Independent	Mary–Ellen Hall	50	35	15	0	0	0	0	0	SW Regional Tournament; NAIA National Championship
1998	NAIA Independent	Mary–Ellen Hall	51	35	16	0	0	0	0	0	SW Sectional Tournament Champions; NAIA National Championship
Red River Athletic											
1999	Red River Athletic	Mary–Ellen Hall	56	41	15	0	6	6	0	0	RRAC Tournament Champions; SW Sectionals Tournament Champions; SW Regional Tournament
2000	Red River Athletic	Mary–Ellen Hall	54	41	13	0	12	12	0	0	NAIA Texas Sectional Tournament Champions; NAIA Region VI Tournament Runner-Up
2001	Red River Athletic	Mary–Ellen Hall	47	34	13	0	16	15	1	0	NAIA Independent Sectionals Tournament; NAIA Region VI Tournament
2002	Red River Athletic	Mary–Ellen Hall	57	43	14	0	14	14	0	0	NAIA Independent Sectionals Tournament Champions; NAIA Region VI Tournament; NAIA National Championship
2003	Red River Athletic	Mary–Ellen Hall	54	43	11	0	17	17	0	0	RRAC Tournament Champions; NAIA Region VI Tournament; NAIA National Championship
2004	Red River Athletic	Mary–Ellen Hall	57	48	9	0	19	18	1	0	RRAC Tournament Champions; NAIA Regional VI Tournament; NAIA National Championship
2005	Red River Athletic	Mary–Ellen Hall	56	51	5	0	6	6	0	0	RRAC Tournament Champions; NAIA Region VI Tournament Champions; NAIA National Championship
2006	Red River Athletic	Mary–Ellen Hall	54	41	13	0	24	22	2	0	RRAC Tournament Champions; NCAA Region VI Tournament; NAIA National Championship
2007	Red River Athletic	Mary–Ellen Hall	61	48	13	0	24	19	5	0	RRAC Tournament Champions; NCAA Region VI Tournament; NAIA National Championship
NCAA Independent											
2008	NCAA Independent	Mary–Ellen Hall	41	28	13	0	0	0	0	0	
2009	NCAA Independent	Mary–Ellen Hall	41	18	23	0	0	0	0	0	
Great West											
2010	Great West	Mary–Ellen Hall	46	16	30	0	6	2	4	0	3rd in GWC; Great West Tournament
2011	Great West	Mary–Ellen Hall	59	36	23	0	6	5	1	0	Great West Regular Season Champions; Great West Tournament Champions
2012	Great West	Mary–Ellen Hall	49	16	33	0	6	2	4	0	3rd in GWC; Great West Tournament
Southland Conference											
2013	Southland	Mary–Ellen Hall	42	15	27	0	26	6	20	0	9th in SLC
2014	Southland	Mary–Ellen Hall	50	22	28	0	27	14	13	0	5th in SLC; Southland Tournament
2015	Southland	Mary–Ellen Hall	45	13	32	0	25	5	20	0	11th in SLC
2016	Southland	Mary–Ellen Hall	44	15	29	0	26	7	19	0	10th in SLC
2017	Southland	Mary–Ellen Hall	43	17	26	0	27	8	19	0	10th in SLC
2018	Southland	Mary–Ellen Hall	43	9	34	0	27	8	19	0	10th in SLC
2019	Southland	Mary–Ellen Hall	46	23	23	0	26	10	16	0	9th in SLC
2020	Southland	Mary–Ellen Hall	22	12	10	0	3	1	2	0	Season cut short by COVID-19 pandemic
2021	Southland	Mary–Ellen Hall	39	22	17	0	27	15	12	0	6th in SLC, Southland tournament
2022	Southland	Mary–Ellen Hall	48	19	29	0	17	4	13	0	6th in SLC, Southland tournament
2023	Southland	Mary–Ellen Hall	53	20	33	0	24	9	15	0	7th in SLC Southland tournament
2024	Southland	Mary–Ellen Hall	50	23	27	0	24	9	15	0	T-6th in SLC, Southland tournament

== Head coaches ==
Head coaches
Years Coached	Name	Wins	Losses	Ties
1989–1991	Dr. Les Saunders	47	75	0
1992–Present	Mary–Ellen Hall	817	562	0
