= Texas A&M–Corpus Christi Islanders softball =

Texas A&M–Corpus Christi Islanders
- 2024 Texas A&M–Corpus Christi Islanders softball team
- University: Texas A&M University–Corpus Christi
- Head coach: Kristen Zaleski (3rd season)
- Conference: Southland
- Location: Corpus Christi, Texas, US
- Home stadium: Chapman Field (capacity: 200)
- Nickname: Islanders
- Colors: Royal blue, white, and green

Regular-season conference championships
- 2011

The Texas A&M–Corpus Christi Islanders softball team represents the Texas A&M University–Corpus Christi, located in Corpus Christi, Texas. The Islanders are a member of the Southland Conference and participate in NCAA Division I college softball. The team is currently led by head coach Kristen Zaleski and plays home games at Chapman Field.

== Year-by-year results ==
Statistics overview
| Season | Coach | Overall | Conference | Standing | Postseason |
|---|---|---|---|---|---|
NCAA Division III Independent (2000–2006)
| 2000 | Natasha Dumoski | 20–35–1 | | | |
| 2001 | Natasha Dumoski | 19–42 | | | |
| 2002 | Natasha Dumoski | 35–30 | | | |
| 2003 | Missy Phillips-Dickerson | 31–24 | | | |
| 2004 | Missy Phillips-Dickerson | 40–19 | | | |
| 2005 | Missy Phillips-Dickerson | 42–11 | | | |
| 2006 | Dawn Wuthrich | 10–34 | | | |
| Independents: | | 197–195–1 | | | |
Southland Conference (2007–present)
| 2007 | Dawn Wuthrich | 12–38 | 5–25 | 11th | |
| 2008 | Jake Schumann | 21–32 | 11–19 | 9th | |
| 2009 | Jake Schumann | 23–31 | 12–16 | 9th | |
| 2010 | Jake Schumann | 35–22 | 16–14 | 5th | |
| 2011 | Jake Schumann | 41–19 | 21–9 | 1st | |
| 2012 | Stephanie Hughes | 18–23 | 11–9 | 6th | |
| 2013 | Stephanie Hughes | 11–39 | 6–21 | 10th | |
| 2014 | Stephanie Hughes | 16–36 | 11–15 | 9th | |
| 2015 | Stephanie Hughes | 20–28–1 | 15–11 | 1st (West) | |
| 2016 | Stephanie Hughes | 18–30 | 7–19 | 4th (West) | |
| 2017 | Blake Miller | 12–36 | 4–20 | 6th (West) | |
| 2018 | Blake Miller | 14–37–1 | 5–22 | 5th (West) | |
| 2019 | Blake Miller | 8–43 | 3–23 | 12th | |
| 2020 | Kristen Zaleski | 6–16 | 1–2 | No conference season | Season canceled due to the COVID-19 pandemic |
| 2021 | Kristen Zaleski | 18–30 | 8–16 | 9th | |
| Southland: | | 273–460–2 | 136–241 | | |
| Total: | | 470–655–3 | | | |
National champion Postseason invitational champion Conference regular season champion Conference regular season and conference tournament champion Division regular season champion Division regular season and conference tournament champion Conference tournament champion
