= Stephen F. Austin Ladyjacks softball =

- 2025 Stephen F. Austin Ladyjacks softball team
- University: Stephen F. Austin State University
- Head coach: Jeff Jackson (3rd season)
- Conference: Southland
- Location: Nacogdoches, Texas, US
- Home stadium: SFA Softball Field (capacity: 750)
- Nickname: Ladyjacks
- Colors: Purple and white

NCAA Tournament champions
- Division II: 1986

NCAA WCWS appearances
- Division II: 1983, 1985, 1986

NCAA Tournament appearances
- Division II: 1983, 1984, 1985, 1986

Conference tournament championships
- Southland: 1990, 2008

The Stephen F. Austin Jacks softball team represents the Stephen F. Austin State University, located in Nacogdoches, Texas. The Jacks (short for the more common women's team nickname of Ladyjacks), which participate in NCAA Division I college softball, were members of the Western Athletic Conference through the 2024 season, after which they will return to the Southland Conference after a three-season absence. The team is currently led by head coach Jeff Jackson and plays home games at SFA Softball Field.

== Postseason appearances ==
Division II Level

Women's College World Series:

- 1978
- 1983
- 1985
- 1986 Champions

Division I Level

NISC Tournament:

- 2018
- 2019
