= Central Arkansas Sugar Bears softball =

- 2026 Central Arkansas Sugar Bears softball team
- University: University of Central Arkansas
- Head coach: Kayla Lucas (1st season)
- Conference: UAC
- Location: Conway, Arkansas, US
- Home stadium: Farris Field (capacity: 500)
- Nickname: Sugar Bears
- Colors: Purple and gray

NCAA Tournament appearances
- 2015, 2023

Conference tournament championships
- Southland; 2015 ASUN; 2023

The Central Arkansas Sugar Bears softball team represents the University of Central Arkansas, located in Conway, Arkansas. The Sugar Bears are a member of the United Athletic Conference and participate in NCAA Division I college softball. The team is currently led by head coach Kayla Lucas and plays home games at Farris Field.

== History ==
The Central Arkansas Sugar Bears inaugural softball season was in 1996. From 1996 to 2006, the Sugar Bears competed in the Gulf South Conference at the NCAA Division II level. In 2007, the university moved to NCAA Division I play with the university's move to the Southland Conference. Three coaches have led the Sugar Bears. Natalie Shock coached the team in all but the final year of the Division II period as well as the second year at the Division I level. The team compiled and overall record of 207–296 and a conference record of 109–127 during Shock's eleven-year tenure. Steve Kissel coached the Sugar Bears for their last year in the Gulf South Conference and their first year as a Southland Conference member. His teams compiled an overall record of 28–76 and 15–48 record in conference play. David Kuhn, the Sugar Bears current head coach, has led the team for seven seasons. As of the conclusion of the 2015 season, the team has compiled a 209–189 overall record and a 95–88 record in conference play.

In 2015, the Sugar Bears won their first conference tournament championship and received the Southland Conference auto-bid to the 2015 NCAA Division I softball tournament. The team competed in their first NCAA tournament at the Norman Regional.

== Year-by-year results ==
Season	Conference	Coach	Overall				Conference				Notes
Season	Conference	Coach	Games	Win	Loss	Tie	Games	Win	Loss	Tie	Notes
NCAA Year-by-Year Results
1996	Gulf South	Natalie Shock	28	14	14	0	14	7	7	0	3rd (West)
1997	Gulf South	Natalie Shock	39	12	27	0	16	6	10	0	4th (West)
1998	Gulf South	Natalie Shock	48	20	28	0	16	8	8	0	3rd (West)
1999	Gulf South	Natalie Shock	45	26	19	0	22	14	8	0	3rd (West)
2000	Gulf South	Natalie Shock	50	29	21	0	24	17	7	0	3rd (West)
2001	Gulf South	Natalie Shock	52	21	31	0	20	10	10	0	4th (West)
2002	Gulf South	Natalie Shock	57	26	31	0	20	11	9	0	4th (West)
2003	Gulf South	Natalie Shock	44	17	27	0	26	12	14	0	4th (West)
2004	Gulf South	Natalie Shock	44	17	27	0	21	9	12	0	5th (West)
2005	Gulf South	Natalie Shock	47	19	28	0	28	11	17	0	5th (West)
2006	Gulf South	Steve Kissel	56	12	34	0	33	9	24	0	7th (West)
Team; Overall – Division II			500	213	287	0	240	114	126	0	
2007	Southland	Steve Kissel	58	16	42	0	30	6	24	0	10th
2008	Southland	Natalie Shock	49	6	43	0	29	4	25	0	11th
2009	Southland	David Kuhn	55	24	31	0	29	14	15	0	7th
2010	Southland	David Kuhn	56	25	31	0	29	13	16	0	8th
2011	Southland	David Kuhn	56	26	30	0	30	12	18	0	8th
2012	Southland	David Kuhn	58	36	32	0	20	8	12	0	3rd
2013	Southland	David Kuhn	58	38	38	0	25	15	10	0	4th
2014	Southland	David Kuhn	59	25	34	0	26	13	13	0	6th
2015	Southland	David Kuhn	56	35	21	0	24	16	8	0	3rd (East); SLC Tournament Champion; NCAA Tournament, 1st Round
2016	Southland	David Kuhn	57	35	22	0	27	16	11	0	4th (East)
2017	Southland	David Kuhn	59	25	34	0	27	14	13	0	4th (East)
2018	Southland	David Kuhn	56	29	27	0	27	16	11	0	4th (East)
2019	Southland	David Kuhn	54	26	28	0	27	12	15	0	8th
2020	Southland	David Kuhn	27	18	9	0	3	3	0	0	Season cut short due to the COVID-19 pandemic
2021	Southland	David Kuhn	56	37	19	0	27	21	6	0	2nd
2022	ASUN	Jenny Parsons	58	37	21	0	24	17	7	0	1st (West)
2023	ASUN	Jenny Parsons	57	45	12	0	24	22	2	0	1st ASUN Tournament Champs; NCAA Tournament Regional
2024	ASUN	Jenny Parsons	54	26	27	1	23	15	7	1	3rd
2025	ASUN	Jenny Parsons									
Team; Overall – Division I			810	366	444	0	380	183	197	0	
Team; Overall – Program History			1,310	579	731	0	620	297	323	0	

== Post season appearances ==
=== Conference Tournaments ===
Year	Conference	Record	%	Notes
Conference softball tournament Results
2012	Southland	0–2	.000	
2013	Southland	2–2	.500	
2014	Southland	1–2	.333	
2015	Southland	4–0	1.000	Tournament Champion
2016	Southland	0-2	.000	
2017	Southland	2-2	.500	
2018	Southland	0-1	.000	
2019	Southland	0-1	.000	
2020	Southland			No Tournament - COVID
2021	Southland	3-2	.600	
2022	ASUN	2-2	.500	
2023	ASUN	5-1	.833	Tournament Champion
2024	ASUN	2-2	.500	
Total		21–19	.525	12 Appearances

=== NCAA Division I Tournament results ===
The Sugar Bears have appeared in two NCAA Division I Tournaments. Their record is 1-4.

Year	Round	Opponent	Result/Score
NCAA Division I Tournament Results
2015	First Game; Second Game	Oklahoma; Lehigh	L 0–8; L 0–3
2023	First Game; Second Game; Third Game	Middle Tennessee; LIU; Middle Tennessee	L 0-8 [5] W 15-0 [5] L 0-3

== Awards ==
NFCA Golden Shoe Award

- Jenna Wildeman (2021)
