= Northwestern State Lady Demons softball =

Northwestern State Lady Demons
- 2027 Northwestern State Lady Demons softball team
- University: Northwestern State University
- Head coach: Vacant
- Conference: Southland
- Location: Natchitoches, Louisiana, US
- Home stadium: Lady Demon Diamond (capacity: 1,000)
- Nickname: Lady Demons
- Colors: Purple, white, and orange trim

NCAA Tournament appearances
- 1998, 2000, 2002, 2013, 2014

Conference tournament championships
- Southland: 1998, 2000, 2002, 2013, 2014

Regular-season conference championships
- Southland: 1991, 1998, 1999, 2000, 2015

The Northwestern State Lady Demons softball team represents Northwestern State University in NCAA Division I college softball. The team participates in the Southland Conference. The Lady Demons were most recently led by head coach Lacy Prejean. The team plays its home games at Lady Demon Diamond located on the university's campus.

In 2013, the Lady Demons' home field, Lady Demon Diamond, received a $466,000 renovation including a partially covered grandstand with chairback seating, a new press box, and concession stand.

== History ==
Softball began at Northwestern State in 1979. The Lady Demons have competed in every season since that time. The program has won four Southland Conference regular season titles (1991, 1998, 1999, 2000), five Southland Conference tournament titles (1998, 2000, 2002, 2013, 2014). As conference tournament champions, the Lady Demons won the conference's automatic bid to the NCAA Division I Softball Championship tournament. As of the start of the 2015 season the Lady Demons have an all-time record of 924–912–3 and a Southland Conference record of 344–335.

The Lady Demons tie for second most regular season conference championships. The team has also performed well in the Southland conference tournament. At five, the Lady Demons are second in the number of conference tournament championships. In addition to winning five tournament titles, the team has the best tournament winning percentage (.651) with an overall record of 43–23 and has the second most conference tournament appearances of current conference membership at 16. Five Lady Demons have been named the conference tournament Most Valuable Player. Twenty-nine Lady Demons have been named to the conference All Tournament team with ten of those players named to the team multiple times.

== Year-by-year results ==
Season	Conference	Coach	Overall				Conference				Notes
Season	Conference	Coach	Games	Win	Loss	Tie	Games	Win	Loss	Tie	Notes
Independent
1979	Independent	Pam Carey	24	10	14	0	0	0	0	0	
1980	Independent	Debra Pheil	26	11	15	0	0	0	0	0	
1981	Independent	James Smith	24	14	10	0	0	0	7	0	
1982	Independent	James Smith	27	17	10	0	0	0	0	0	
1983	Independent	James Smith	29	19	10	0	0	0	0	0	
1984	Independent	James Smith	35	12	23	0	0	0	0	0	
Gulf States Conference
1985	Gulf States Conference	Linda Jones	47	20	26	1	16	4	12	0	
1986	Gulf States Conference	Linda Jones	43	23	20	0	20	10	10	0	
1987	Gulf States Conference	Rickey McCalister	42	22	20	0	20	11	9	0	
Southland Conference
1988	Southland	Rickey McCalister	49	25	24	0	13	6	7	0	
1989	Southland	Rickey McCalister	61	32	29	0	12	5	7	0	
1990	Southland	Rickey McCalister	61	43	17	0	12	8	4	0	
1991	Southland	Rickey McCalister	63	44	18	1	23	18	5	0	Conference Champions
1992	Southland	Rickey McCalister	59	37	21	1	27	16	11	0	
1993	Southland	Rickey McCalister	53	25	28	0	26	7	19	0	
1994	Southland	Rickey McCalister	59	17	42	0	32	9	23	0	
1995	Southland	Gay McNutt	70	45	25	0	27	22	5	0	
1996	Southland	Gay McNutt	51	10	41	0	24	7	17	0	
1997	Southland	Gay McNutt	55	26	29	0	22	12	10	0	
1998	Southland	Gay McNutt	58	40	18	0	26	23	3	0	SLC regular season champions SLC tournament champs NCAA tournament – 1st round
1999	Southland	Gay McNutt	57	31	26	0	26	19	7	0	SLC regular season champions
2000	Southland	Gay McNutt	60	41	19	0	26	22	4	0	SLC regular season champs SLC tournament champs NCAA tournament – 1st round
2001	Southland	Ty Singleton	50	30	20	0	26	15	11	0	
2002	Southland	Ty Singleton	70	45	25	0	27	22	5	0	SLC tournament champs NCAA tournament – 1st round
2003	Southland	Eileen Schmidt	60	27	33	0	27	14	13	0	
2004	Southland	Eileen Schmidt	63	35	28	0	26	14	12	0	
2005	Southland	Mike Perniciaro	63	35	28	0	27	15	12	0	
2006	Southland	Becky McMurty	60	28	32	0	25	12	13	0	
2007	Southland	Becky McMurty	58	29	29	0	30	17	13	0	
2008	Southland	Becky McMurty	55	10	45	0	29	5	24	0	
2009	Southland	Donald Pickett	50	5	45	0	29	3	26	0	
2010	Southland	Donald Pickett	54	27	27	0	30	13	17	0	
2011	Southland	Donald Pickett	57	32	25	0	32	15	17	0	
2012	Southland	Donald Pickett	50	19	31	0	21	7	14	0	
2013	Southland	Donald Pickett	55	40	15	0	25	18	7	0	SLC tournament champs NCAA tournament – 1st round
2014	Southland	Donald Pickett	50	30	20	0	25	15	10	0	SLC tournament champs NCAA tournament – 1st round
2015	Southland	Donald Pickett	54	36	18	0	25	22	3	0	SLC regular season champs SLC tournament finalist
2016	Southland	Donald Pickett	52	27	25	0	27	10	17	0	
2017	Southland	Donald Pickett	57	23	33	1	27	12	15	0	
2018	Southland	Donald Pickett	53	28	25	0	27	14	13	0	
2019	Southland	Donald Pickett	57	30	27	0	27	15	12	0	
2020	Southland	Donald Pickett	22	15	7	0	3	3	0	0	Series cut short by COVID-19 pandemic
2021	Southland	Donald Pickett	46	24	22	0	27	16	11	0	

== Post Season Play ==
=== NCAA Division I Tournament results ===
The Lady Demons have appeared in five NCAA Division I Tournaments. Their combined record is 0–10.

Year	Round	Opponent	Result/Score
NCAA Division I Tournament Results
1998	First Game; Second Game	Washington; Long Beach State	L 0–2; L 1–9
2000	First Game; Second Game	LSU; Oregon	L 1–7; L 1–4
2002	First Game; Second Game	LSU; Mississippi State	L 2–3 (10); L 6–9
2013	First Game; Second Game	Louisiana–Lafayette; Central Connecticut State	L 0–3; L 1–9
2014	First Game; Second Game	Baylor; Houston	L 1–6; L 6–7

== Honors and awards ==
=== Southland Conference ===
Sources: Player of the Year

- Rhonda Rube, 1989, 91,
- Annie Johnston, 2002

Hitter of the Year

- Brandy Kenney, 1998 (Shared)
- Annie Johnston, 2002
- Anne LaHaye, 1990

Pitcher of the Year

- Cindy Leggett, 1999

Newcomer of the Year

- Rhonda Rube, 1989
- Nancy Percle, 1990
- Annie Johnston, 2001

Freshman of the Year

- Jessica Holaway, 2000

Coach of the Year

- Rickey McCalister, 1989, 90, 91
- Gay McNutt, 1998, 99, 00

All-Conference 1st Team

- Misty Carraway, 1997
- Ginger Craig, 1988
- Lindsey Danzy, 2003, 04
- Amy Grisham, 1991, 92
- Annie Johnston, 2001, 02
- Shante Jones, 1998
- Brandy Kenney, 1998, 99
- Anne LaHaye, 1990
- Cindy Leggett, 1999
- Erin Mancuso, 2001
- Nicole Martin, 2003, 05
- Crista Miller, 2002
- Sarina Noack, 2006
- Sonja Olsen, 1988, 89, 90, 91
- Jennifer Owens, 1998
- Erin Palomarez, 2001
- Missy Pereira, 1990
- Claudia Percle, 1990
- Nancy Percle, 1990
- Brianna Rodriguez, 2013
- Rhonda Rube, 1989, 90, 91
- Rustie Stevens, 1992
- Shannon Straty, 1999
- Linette Stuart, 1999
- Brittany Virgoe, 2014
- Amber Welker, 2000

== See also ==
- List of NCAA Division I softball programs
