= Lamar Lady Cardinals softball =

Lamar Lady Cardinals
- 2025 Lamar Lady Cardinals softball team
- Founded: 1983 (Restart: 2013)
- University: Lamar University
- Athletic director: Jeff O'Malley
- Head coach: Amy Hooks (7th season)
- Conference: Southland
- Location: Beaumont, Texas, US
- Home stadium: Lamar Softball Complex (capacity: 500; 767 including berm seating)
- Nickname: Lady Cardinals
- Colors: Red and white

The Lamar Lady Cardinals softball team represents Lamar University in NCAA Division I college softball. The team competes in the Southland Conference. The Lady Cardinals are currently led by head coach Amy Hooks. The team played its home games at the off–campus Ford Park for the first two seasons following the program restart in 2013. The Lady Cardinals began playing home games at the Lamar Softball Complex located on the university's campus starting with the 2015 season.

== History ==
=== AIAW era ===
LU first sponsored softball from 1971 through 1977 competing in the AIAW. Lamar finished second in the 1972 AIAW Texas state tournament. In addition to other head coaching duties, Pat Park was the Lady Cardinals head coach for the initial seasons. Coach Park also served as women's head coach for basketball, tennis, and golf while she was at Lamar.

The off-campus Beaumont Athletic Complex served as the Lady Cardinals home during the 1971 to 1977 period.

=== NCAA Division I era ===
In 1983 Lamar added softball as an NCAA Division I sport and competed in the Southland conference. Tryouts for the team were held on October 16, 1982. The sport was dropped in 1987 when Lamar left the Southland Conference. Patty Calvert was head coach during the 1982–1987 period.

On April 22, 2011, Athletic Director Larry Tidwell announced plans to reinstate college softball as an NCAA Division I sport at Lamar University. On August 1, 2011, former Morehead State head coach Holly Bruder was announced as the finalist to fill the head coaching position at Lamar after over 20 years with no program at the university. The Lady Cardinals finished fifth in the Southland Conference in their first season of competition (2012–13) following the restart of the program. The team also earned a berth in the Southland Conference softball tournament. Holly Bruder was removed as head coach on May 11, 2018. On June 20, 2018, Amy Hooks was named as head coach for the team.

Off–campus Ford Park was the home field for the first two seasons after the program was restarted. A new on–campus stadium was constructed in 2014–15. On October 17, 2014, a ground breaking ceremony for the new Lamar Softball Complex was held. The first game at the partially completed on–campus stadium was played on March 6, 2015, against the Houston Baptist Huskies. The stadium was completed following the 2015 season.

=== NCAA Year–by–year results ===
Season	Conference	Coach	Overall				Conference				Notes
Season	Conference	Coach	Games	Win	Loss	Tie	Games	Win	Loss	Tie	Notes
NCAA Year–by–Year Results
1983	Southland	Patty Calvert	45	5	40	0	8	1	7	0	5th (3rd South Zone)
1984	Southland	Patty Calvert	56	13	43	0	8	1	7	0	5th (3rd South Zone)
1985	Southland	Patty Calvert	42	14	28	0	12	6	6	0	5th
1986	Southland	Patty Calvert	33	14	19	0	12	8	4	0	3rd
1987	Southland	Patty Calvert	35	9	26	0	12	3	9	0	T–3rd
		Patty Calvert	211	55	156	0	52	19	33	0	
2013	Southland	Holly Bruder	59	24	35	0	27	14	13	0	5th
2014	Southland	Holly Bruder	50	20	30	0	26	12	14	0	8th
2015	Southland	Holly Bruder	54	26	28	0	23	14	10	0	5th
2016	Southland	Holly Bruder	57	35	22	0	27	18	9	0	4th, SLC tournament championship game appearance
2017	Southland	Holly Bruder	65	34	31	0	27	17	10	0	4th, SLC tournament appearance, finalist – NISC
2018	Southland	Holly Bruder	56	28	28	0	27	11	16	0	9th
		Holly Bruder	341	167	174	0	158	86	72	0	
2019	Southland	Amy Hooks	57	23	34	0	27	14	13	0	7th
2020	Southland	Amy Hooks	21	9	12	0	3	0	3	0	Season cut short by COVID-19 pandemic
2021	Southland	Amy Hooks	51	8	43	0	27	4	23	0	
2022	WAC	Amy Hooks	49	11	38	0	24	5	19	0	
2023	Southland	Amy Hooks	56	22	34	0	24	12	12	0	4th, 2023 SLC tournament appearance (2–2)
2024	Southland	Amy Hooks	51	26	25	0	24	12	12	0	5th, 2024 SLC tournament appearance (0–2)
2025	Southland	Amy Hooks	56	29	27	0	27	15	12	0	5th, 2025 SLC tournament appearance (1–2)
		Amy Hooks	341	128	213	0	156	62	94	0	
Team; Overall			872	341	541	0	363	167	206	0	

(Results reflect games through May 3, 2025.)

=== Yearly attendance ===
Below is the Lady Cardinals' home attendance since the 2012–13 restart of the program.

Season	Average	High
Yearly Home Attendance
Lamar Softball Complex
2024	526	1,273
2024	418	750
2023	425	542
2022	249	550
2021–	108*	119*
2020	280**	386**
2019	215	467
2018	371	505
2017	316	466
2016	375	588
2015	292***	440***
Ford Park
2014	290	359
2013	338	618

*Note: Attendance restricted to 119 fans due to COVID19 precautions.
**Note: Games after March 10, 2020, cancelled due to COVID19 precautions.
*** Note: Temporary seating.
As of the 2023–24 season.

== Post season appearances ==
=== National Invitational Softball Championship ===
The Lady Cardinals have participated in one national tournament, the inaugural National Invitational Softball Championship which started in 2017. The team compiled a 6–3 record in that tournament losing to Liberty in the championship game.

Year	Record	Pct	Notes
2017	6–3	.667	Beaumont, TX Regional; Beat Louisiana–Monroe (7–5), Beat Abilene Christian (6–1), Lost to Louisiana–Monroe (1–2), Beat Louisiana–Monroe (3–2); Lynchburg, VA Championship; Beat Cal Poly (8–6), Beat Illinois State (2–1), Beat Kennesaw State (5–4), Lost to Liberty (5–8), Lost to Liberty (1–3) in the championship game.
TOTALS	6–3	.667	1 National Invitational Softball Championship appearance

=== Conference Tournaments ===
Year	Conference	Record	%	Notes
Southland Conference Tournament Results
1983	Southland	2–2	.500	Consolation bracket finals
1984	Southland	0–2	.000	Consolation bracket 1st round
1985	Southland	1–2	.333	Consolation bracket 2nd round
1986	Southland	1–2	.333	Consolation bracket 2nd round
1987	Southland	0–2	.000	Consolation bracket 2nd round
did not field team from 1987–88 to 2011–12
2013	Southland	0–2	.000	
2015	Southland	2–2	.500	3rd place
2016	Southland	3–2	.600	Runner up
2017	Southland	1–2	.333	2nd round
2019	Southland	0–1	.000	Single elimination opening round
2023	Southland	2–2	.500	3rd place
2024	Southland	0–2	.000	
Total		13–23	.361	12 Appearances

== Awards and honors ==
=== Southland Conference ===
==== All Conference First Team ====
- Donna Dugas 1985, 87
- Teresa Fuxa 1986
- Tina Schulz 2014
- Bryn Baca 2016, '17
- Brittany Rodriguez 2016, '17
- Kendall Talley 2018
- Jade Lewis 2019

==== Hitter of the Year ====
- Donna Dugas 1986

==== Newcomer of the Year ====
- Laura Hall 1985
- Ciara Luna 2016
- Jade Lewis 2019
- Shenita Tucker 2024

== Seasons ==
=== 2025 Lamar Lady Cardinals softball team ===
2025 Lamar Lady Cardinals softball
- Conference: Southland Conference
- Record: 29–27 (15–12 Southland)
- Head coach: Amy Hooks (7th season)
- Assistant coaches: Tara McKenney; Kaitlin McFarland; Presley Bell
- Home stadium: Lamar Softball Complex

2025 Southland Conference softball standings
	Conf.				Overall
Team	W		L	PCT	W		L	PCT
McNeese State ‍†‍‍	23	–	4	.852	41	–	20	.672
Southeastern Louisiana ‍‍‡‍^{y}	21	–	6	.778	50	–	16	.758
Nicholls ‍‍‍	19	–	8	.704	31	–	24	.564
Incarnate Word ‍‍‍	17	–	10	.630	29	–	21	.580
Lamar ‍‍‍	15	–	12	.556	29	–	27	.518
Stephen F. Austin ‍‍‍	14	–	13	.519	27	–	29	.482
Houston Christian ‍‍‍	10	–	17	.370	17	–	33	.340
Texas A&M–Corpus Christi ‍‍‍	6	–	21	.222	12	–	36	.250
East Texas A&M ‍‍‍	6	–	21	.222	10	–	42	.192
Northwestern State ‍‍‍	4	–	23	.148	7	–	43	.140
† – Conference champion ‡ – Tournament champion y – Invited to the NCAA tournament As of May 18, 2025; Rankings from NFCA/USA Today

The 2025 Lamar Lady Cardinals softball team represented Lamar University during the 2025 NCAA Division I softball season. The Lady Cardinals played their home games at Lamar Softball Complex as a member of the Southland Conference led by head coach Amy Hooks in her seventh-year at Lamar. The team compiled a 29–27 overall record and a 15–12 record in conference play for a fifth-place finish. Qualifying as the fifth seeded team in the SLC conference tournament, the Lady Cardinals were 1–2 in tournament play defeating East Texas A&M and losing twice to Incarnate Word.

==== Southland Conference Coaches Poll ====
The Southland Conference Coaches Poll was released on January 30, 2025. Lamar was picked to finish fifth in the Southland Conference with 95 votes.

**Coaches poll**
Predicted finish	Team	Votes (1st place)
1	Southeastern Louisiana	152 (9)
2	McNeese	151 (9)
3	Incarnate Word	130 (2)
4	Nicholls	106
**5**	**Lamar**	**95**
6	Texas A&M–Corpus Christi	70
7	Houston Christian	68
8	Stephen F. Austin	62
9	Northwestern State	48
9	East Texas A&M	20

==== Preseason All-Southland team ====
Aubrey Brown and Emma Wardlaw were named to the conference preseason first team. Jane Sepulveda and Makenzie Wright were named as conference preseason second team members.

===== First Team =====
- Monee Montilla (TAMUCC, SR, 1st Base)
- Ryleigh Mata* (UIW, SR, 2nd Base)
- Chloe Magee (SELU, SO, Shortstop)
- Rylie Bouvier* (MCNS, SR, 3rd Base)
- Riley Rutherford (NICH, SR, Catcher)
- Victoria Altamirano* (UIW, JR, Utility)
- **Aubrey Brown (LU, SO, Designated Player)**
- Reagan Heflin* (NICH, JR, Outfielder)
- Alexis Dibbley* (MCNS, SO, Outfielder)
- Jillian Gutierrez* (UIW, JR, Outfielder)
- Ryann Schexnayder (MCNS, JR, Pitcher)
- **Emma Wardlaw (LU, SO, Pitcher)**

*-2024 Southland All-Conference Selection

===== Second Team =====
- Maddie Watson (SELU, SR, 1st Base)
- **Jayne Sepulveda (LU, SR, 2nd Base)**
- Baylee Lemons* (UIW, SR, Shortstop)
- Maria Detillier (SELU, JR, 3rd Base)
- **Makenzie Wright (LU, SO, Catcher)**
- Haylie Savage* (HCU, SR, Utility)
- Karlie Barba (HCU, JR, Designated Player)
- Samantha Mundine (MCNS, SO, Outfielder)
- AB Garcia (HCU, JR, Outfielder)
- Shenita Tucker (SELU, SR, Outfielder)
- Averi Paden (NICH, JR, Pitcher)
- Molly Yoo (NICH, JR, Pitcher)

*-2024 Southland All-Conference Selection

==== Roster ====
2025 Lamar Lady Cardinals softball team
Players
Coaches

#	Pos.	Name	Bats/throws	Height	Year	Home town
00	OF	Neveah Hallmark	R/R	5 ft 7 in (1.7 m)	Fr	Pasadena, Texas
1	C	Cimara-lei Wessling	R/R	—	Fr	Converse, Texas
2	RHP	Cala Wilson	R/R	5 ft 9 in (1.75 m)	Fr	Ruston, Louisiana
3	INF	Kalie Amos	R/R	5 ft 7 in (1.7 m)	Jr	Oklahoma City, Oklahoma
4	RHP	Mallory Pitre	R/R	5 ft 6 in (1.68 m)	Sr	Opelousas, Louisiana
7	INF	Aubrey Brown	L/R	5 ft 2 in (1.57 m)	So	Wylie, Texas
8	RHP	Makayla Valle	R/R	5 ft 1 in (1.55 m)	So	Aurora, Colorado
9	LHP	Madison Guidry	L/L	5 ft 6 in (1.68 m)	Fr	La Porte, Texas
10	INF	Rose Gonzales	R/R	5 ft 7 in (1.7 m)	Sr	Grand Prairie, Texas
11	U	Kalyn Xayaseng	R/R	5 ft 11 in (1.8 m)	Sr	Call, Texas
15	OF	Roxy Thompson	R/R	5 ft 6 in (1.68 m)	So	Rockwall, Texas
16	INF	Jane Supulveda	R/R	5 ft 7 in (1.7 m)	Sr	Monterey Park, California
17	INF	Ava Blakely	R/R	5 ft 4 in (1.63 m)	Fr	Wesley Chapel, Florida
20	INF	Sam Flores	R/R	5 ft 3 in (1.6 m)	So	Humble, Texas
21	C	Emilee LaRue	R/R	5 ft 9 in (1.75 m)	Jr	Blanco, Texas
24	U	Trinity Brandon	L/R	5 ft 6 in (1.68 m)	Jr	Las Vegas, Nevada
25	INF	Veronica Harrison	R/R	5 ft 4 in (1.63 m)	So	Alvin, Texas
28	RHP	Sabrina Jolin	R/R	5 ft 6 in (1.68 m)	So	Anchorage, Alaska
29	RHP	Kaylee Cuevas	R/R	5 ft 7 in (1.7 m)	Fr	League City, Texas
32	INF	Gracee Hess	R/R	5 ft 1 in (1.55 m)	Jr	Belle Chasse, Louisiana
33	INF	Sicily Windham	R/R	5 ft 7 in (1.7 m)	Fr	Huntington Beach, California
34	RHP	Emma Wardlaw	R/R	5 ft 10 in (1.78 m)	So	Comfort, Texas
44	C	Raigan Brannon	R/R	5 ft 8 in (1.73 m)	So	Mansfield, Texas
50	RHP	Reagan Smith	R/R	5 ft 11 in (1.8 m)	Jr	Santa Fe, Texas
99	C	Makenzie Wright	R/R	5 ft 8 in (1.73 m)	So	Pearland, Texas

Head coach

Amy Hooks (University of Texas at Austin) – 7th year

Assistant coach(es)

Tara McKenney (Northwestern State University) – 7th year
Kaitlin McFarland (Liberty University) – 2nd year
Presley Bell (University of Houston) – 1st year

Legend

- **(C)** Team captain
- **(S)** Suspended
- **(I)** Ineligible
- Injured
- Current redshirt

Roster
Last update: February 3, 2025

==== Schedule and results ====
Legend
	Lamar win
	Lamar loss
	Postponement/cancellation
**Bold**	Lamar team member
*	Non-conference game
†	Make-up game

2025 Lamar Lady Cardinals Softball game log (29–27)
Regular season (29–27)

February (10–7)
Date	Opponent	Rank	Site/stadium	Score	Win	Loss	Save	TV	Attendance	Overall record	SLC Record
UH/LU tournament
Feb 7	vs. Louisiana–Monroe*		Lamar Softball Complex • Beaumont, TX	3–0	**Reagan Smith (1–0)**	Victoria Abrams (0–1)	None	ESPN+	200	1–0	
Feb 7	vs. Louisiana–Monroe*		Lamar Softball Complex • Beaumont, TX	3–2	**Mallory Pitry (1–0)**	Mimi Blackledge (0–1)	None	ESPN+	345	2–0	
Feb 8	vs. St. Johns*		Lamar Softball Complex • Beaumont, TX	4–3^{8}	**Reagan Smith (2–0)**	Loreley Francia (1–2)	None		506	3–0	
Feb 8	vs. #1 Texas*		Lamar Softball Complex • Beaumont, TX	7–13	Gutierrez, Citlaly Gutierrez (1–0)	**Madison Guidry (0–1)**	None		1,273	3–1	
I-10 Border Classic
Feb 13	vs. Nicholls*		Lamar Softball Complex • Beaumont, TX	12–1; 5 inn	**Jolin, Sabrina (1–0)**	Paden, Averi (1–2)	None	ESPN+	367	4–1	
Feb 14	vs. Missouri State*		Lamar Softball Complex • Beaumont, TX	3–2	**Wardlaw, Emma (2–0)**	Mackenzie Chacon (0–1)	None	ESPN+	561	5–1	
Feb 15	vs. Tulsa*		Lamar Softball Complex • Beaumont, TX	2–6	MOORE, Maura (4–1)	**Wardlaw, Emma (1–1)**	None	ESPN+	598	5–2	
Feb 15	vs. #6 Tennessee*		Lamar Softball Complex • Beaumont, TX	0–13^{5}	Peyton Tanner (2–0)	**Jolin, Sabrina (1–1)**	None	ESPN+	874	5–3	
Feb 16	vs. Missouri State*		Lamar Softball Complex • Beaumont, TX	3–2	**Guidry, Madison (1–1)**	Makenzi Swick (0–1)	None	ESPN+	506	6–3	
Feb 19	at Houston*		Cougar Softball Stadium • Houston, TX				**Postponed to March 18 due to forecast inclement weather.**				
Frost Classic
Feb 21	vs. Indiana State*		Frost Stadium • Chattanooga, TN				**Cancelled due to frigid temperatures.**				
Feb 21	vs. Southeast Missouri State*		Frost Stadium • Chattanooga, TN				**Cancelled due to frigid temperatures.**				
Feb 22	vs. Chattanooga*		Frost Stadium • Chattanooga, TN	4–5	Peja Goold (2–3)	**Smith, Reagan (2–1)**	None		146	6–4	
Feb 22	vs. UIndy*		Frost Stadium • Chattanooga, TN	2–3	Dickerson, Callie (1–0)	**Guidry, Madison (1–2)**	None		100	6–5	
Feb 23	vs. Indiana State*		Frost Stadium • Chattanooga, TN	7–5	**Guidry, Madison (2–2)**	Griffin, Hailey (0–2)	**Pitre, Mallory (1)**		55	7–5	
Feb 23	vs. Illinois State*		Frost Stadium • Chattanooga, TN	1–6	Meshnick, Hannah (3–3)	**Smith, Reagan (2–2)**	None		100	7–6	
Feb 25	at Sam Houston*		Bearkat Softball Complex • Huntsville, TX	4–3	**Guidry, Madison (4–3)**	Abigail Young (3–2)	None	ESPN+	416	8–6	
Black and Gold Challenge
Feb 28	vs. Jacksonville State*		Southern Miss Softball Complex • Hattiesburg, MS	1–3	Jordan Eslinger (2–2)	**Jolin, Sabrina (1–2)**	Kat Carter (1)		500	8–7	
Feb 28	vs. Louisiana Tech*		Southern Miss Softball Complex • Hattiesburg, MS	5–3	**Guidry, Madison (4–2)**	Floyd, Allie (6–4)	None		788	9–7	

March (8–9)
Date	Opponent	Rank	Site/stadium	Score	Win	Loss	Save	TV	Attendance	Overall record	SLC Record
Black and Gold Challenge (continued)
Mar 1	vs. Jacksonville State*		Southern Miss Softball Complex • Hattiesburg, MS	1–13^{5}	MacKinley Portillo (3–1)	**Smith, Reagan (2–3)**	None		500	9–8	
Mar 1	at Southern Miss*		Southern Miss Softball Complex • Hattiesburg, MS	4–5	Kayla Giardina (2–2)	**Guidry, Madison (4–3)**	None	ESPN+	831	9–9	
Mar 2	vs. Louisiana Tech*		Southern Miss Softball Complex • Hattiesburg, MS	5–4	**Guidry, Madison (5–3)**	Buster, Mattison (1–2)	None		738	10–9	
Mar 4	Texas Southern*		Lamar Softball Complex • Beaumont, TX	11–0^{5}	**Pitre, Mallory (2–0)**	Marisa Perla (0–1)	None	ESPN+	111	11–9	
Battle of the Border (Rivalry)
Mar 7	vs. McNeese		Lamar Softball Complex • Beaumont, TX	5–6	Schexnayder, Ryann (3–1)	**Guidry, Madison (5–4)**	Williams, Kadence (2)	ESPN+	400	11–10	0–1
Mar 7	vs. McNeese		Lamar Softball Complex • Beaumont, TX	7–0	**Wardlaw, Emma (2–1)**	Dibbley, Alexis (2–2)	**Pitre, Mallory (2)**		690	12–10	1–1
Mar 8	vs. McNeese		Lamar Softball Complex • Beaumont, TX	4–0	**Smith, Reagan (3–3)**	Williams, Kadence (1–4)	None	ESPN+	671	13–10	2–1
Mar 12	Baylor*		Lamar Softball Complex • Beaumont, TX	8–6	**Smith, Reagan (4–3)**	Lexie Warncke (4–4)	None	ESPN+	975	14–10	
Mar 14	at Stephen F. Austin		SFA Softball Field • Nacogdoches, TX	4–1	**Smith, Reagan (5–3)**	A. Telford (3–1)	None		77	15–10	3–1
Mar 15	at Stephen F. Austin		SFA Softball Field • Nacogdoches, TX	4–5	B. Gainous (2–5)	**Wardlaw, Emma (2–2)**	None		103	15–11	3–2
Mar 15	at Stephen F. Austin		SFA Softball Field • Nacogdoches, TX	4–8	Telford, Alexis (4–1)	**M. Guidry (5–5)**	None		168	15–12	3–3
Mar 18	at Houston*		Cougar Softball Stadium • Houston, TX	6–10	Michalak, Rylee (4–1)	**Jolin, Sabrina (1–3)**	None	ESPN+	295	15–13	
Mar 21	vs. East Texas A&M		Lamar Softball Complex • Beaumont, TX	8–7^{9}	**Smith, Reagan (6–4)**	Houser, Kate (2–2)	None	ESPN+	305	16–13	4–3
Mar 21	vs. East Texas A&M		Lamar Softball Complex • Beaumont, TX	6–4	**Pitre, Mallory (3–0)**	Muller, Maddie (2–11)	None	ESPN+	415	17–13	5–3
Mar 22	vs. East Texas A&M		Lamar Softball Complex • Beaumont, TX	5–4	**Pitre, Mallory (4–0)**	Sanchez, Julia (3–10)	()	ESPN+	307	18–13	6–3
Mar 28	at Nicholls		Swanner Field at Geo Surfaces Park • Thibodaux, LA	1–5	Yoo, Molly (6–7)	**Pitre, Mallory (4–1)**	None		155	18–14	6–4
Mar 28	at Nicholls		Swanner Field at Geo Surfaces Park • Thibodaux, LA	4–10	Paden, Averi (3–6)	**Smith, Reagan (6–5)**	None		111	18–15	6–5
Mar 29	at Nicholls		Swanner Field at Geo Surfaces Park • Thibodaux, LA	3–11	Paden, Averi (4–6)	**Cuevas, Kaylee (0–1)**	None		201	18–16	6–6

April (10–9)
Date	Opponent	Rank	Site/stadium	Score	Win	Loss	Save	TV	Attendance	Overall record	SLC Record
Apr 1	vs. Houston		Lamar Softball Complex • Beaumont, TX	3–4	Bodeux, Nicole (3–2)	**Smith, Reagan (6–6)**	None	ESPN+	645	18–17	
Apr 4	at Texas A&M–Corpus Christi		Chapman Field • Corpus Christi, TX	7–1	**Pitre, Mallory (5–1)**	Williams, Malia (4–8)	None	ESPN+	338	19–17	7–6
Apr 4	at Texas A&M–Corpus Christi		Chapman Field • Corpus Christi, TX	3–1	**Pitre, Mallory (6–1)**	Winfrey, Kendra (4–7)	None	ESPN+	356	20–17	8–6
Apr 5	at Texas A&M–Corpus Christi		Chapman Field • Corpus Christi, TX	12–0^{6}	**Cuevas, Kaylee (1–1)**	Hardy, Zoe (0–4)	None	ESPN+	244	21–17	9–6
Apr 8	vs. Southeastern Louisiana		Lamar Softball Complex • Beaumont, TX	5–3	**Smith, Reagan (7–6)**	Brunson, Allison (0–1)	**Pitre, Mallory (3)**		302	22–17	10–6
Apr 8	vs. Southeastern Louisiana		Lamar Softball Complex • Beaumont, TX	1–2	Burns, Hallie (11–4)	**Pitre, Mallory (6–2)**	None		450	22–18	10–7
Apr 9	vs. Southeastern Louisiana		Lamar Softball Complex • Beaumont, TX	2–3	LaRue, Macie (14–1)	**Pitre, Mallory (6–3)**	None		437	22–19	10–8
Apr 11	at Northwestern State		Lady Demon Diamond • Natchitoches, LA	6–2	**Smith, Reagan (8–6)**	Chandler, Kaymie (1–9)	None	ESPN+	179	23–19	11–8
Apr 11	at Northwestern State		Lady Demon Diamond • Natchitoches, LA	4–1	**Pitre, Mallory (7–3)**	Stohler, Brooklynn (3–22)	Jolin, Sabrina (1)	ESPN+	248	24–19	12–8
Apr 12	at Northwestern State		Lady Demon Diamond • Natchitoches, LA	5–3	**Jolin, Sabrina (2–3)**	Stohler, Brooklynn (3–23)	None	ESPN+	238	25–19	13–8
Apr 15	vs. Tarleton State*		Lamar Softball Complex • Beaumont, TX	0–1	Schultz, Shelby (12–3)	**Guidry, Madison (5–5)**	None	ESPN+	205	25–20	
Apr 15	vs. Tarleton State*		Lamar Softball Complex • Beaumont, TX	2–0	**Wardlaw, Emma (3–2)**	Marquez, Kynlee (3–2)	None	ESPN+	208	26–20	
Apr 17	vs. Houston Christian		Lamar Softball Complex • Beaumont, TX	7–1	**Smith, Reagan (9–6)**	Pitman, Cara (6–9)	None		576	27–20	14–8
Apr 17	vs. Houston Christian		Lamar Softball Complex • Beaumont, TX	10–11	Pitman, Cara (7–9)	**Cuevas, Kaylee (1–2)**	None		703	27–21	14–9
Apr 18	vs. Houston Christian		Lamar Softball Complex • Beaumont, TX	4–9^{9}	Pitman, Cara (8–9)	**Smith, Reagan (9–7)**	None		785	27–22	14–10
Apr 22	vs. Sam Houston*		Lamar Softball Complex • Beaumont, TX	2–3	Daniel, Kendall (7–6)	**Jolin, Sabrina (2–4)**	Young, Abigail (2)	ESPN+	616	27–23	
Apr 26	at Incarnate Word		H-E-B Field • San Antonio, TX	4–3	**Guidry, Madison (6–5)**	Jacquez, Larissa (7–9)	None	ESPN+	215	28–23	15–10
Apr 26	at Incarnate Word		H-E-B Field • San Antonio, TX	6–7	Portillo, Samantha (8–5)	**Pitre, Mallory (7–4)**	None	ESPN+	187	28–24	15–11
Apr 27	at Incarnate Word		H-E-B Field • San Antonio, TX	1–8	Jacquez, Larissa (8–9)	**Cuevas, Kaylee (1–3)**	None	ESPN+	247	28–25	15–12

Postseason (1–2)

Southland Tournament (1–2)
Date	Opponent	(Seed)/Rank	Site/stadium	Score	Win	Loss	Save	TV	Attendance	Overall record	Tournament record
May 1	vs. (4) Incarnate Word	(5)	Joe Miller Field at Cowgirl Diamond • Lake Charles, LA	0–4	Jacquez (9–8)	**Smith, Reagan (9–8)**	None	ESPN+	517	28–26	0–1
May 2	vs. (8) East Texas A&M	(5)	Joe Miller Field at Cowgirl Diamond • Lake Charles, LA	6–5	**Guidry, Madison (7–5)**	Sanchez, Julia (4–18)	**Pitre, Mallory (4)**	ESPN+		29–26	1–1
May 3	vs. (4) Incarnate Word	(5)	Joe Miller Field at Cowgirl Diamond • Lake Charles, LA	2–10^{5}	Mitchell (8–3)	**Pitre, Mallory (7–5)**	None	ESPN+	985	29–27	1–2

–

Schedule source:

*Rankings are based on the team's current ranking in the NFCA/USA Softball poll.

===== Conference awards and honors =====
====== Post-season All-Southland Conference Teams ======
Player of the Year: Victoria Altamirano, Incarnate Word

Hitter of the Year: Victoria Altamirano, Incarnate Word

Pitcher of the Year: Maddie Taylor, McNeese

Freshman of the Year: Kassidy Chance, McNeese

Newcomer of the Year: Macie LaRue, Southeastern Louisiana

Coach of the Year: James Landreneau, McNeese

====== First Team ======
- Victoria Altamirano (UIW, JR, 1st Base)
- Claire Sisco (NICH, JR, 2nd Base)
- Chloe Magee (SLU, SO, Shortstop)
- Maria Detillier (SLU, JR, 3rd Base)
- Sarah Allen (McN, FR, Catcher)
- Kassidy Chance (McN, FR, Utility)
- **Veronica Harrison (LU, SO, Designated Player)**
- Shenita Tucker (SLU, SR, Outfielder)
- Samantha Mundine (McN, SO, Outfielder)
- AB Garcia (HCU, JR, Outfielder)
- Macie LaRue (SLU, JR, Pitcher)
- Maddie Taylor (McN, FR, Pitcher)

====== Second Team ======
- Tatum Wright (ETAM, JR, 1st Base)
- Ellie Vance (SFA, SR, 2nd Base)
- Reese Reyna (McN, SR, Shortstop)
- Haylie Savage (HCU, SR, 3rd Base)
- Adelynn Bacerra (SFA, JR, Catcher)
- Molly VandenBout (NICH, SR, Utility)
- Kyi'Marri Ester (SFA, SO, Designated Player)
- Reagan Heflin (NICH, JR, Outfield)
- Maddie Cason (ETAM, GR, Outfield)
- Nyjah Fontenot (McN, SO-R, Outfield)
- Larissa Jacquez (UIW, SO, Pitcher)
- Britney Lewinski (SLU, SR, Pitcher)

====== All Defensive ======
- **Cala Wilson (LU, FR, 1st Base)**
- Claire Sisco (NICH, JR, 2nd Base)
- Reese Reyna (McN, SR, Shortstop)
- **Trinity Brandon (LU, JR, 3rd Base)**
- Jaisy Caceres (UIW, SO, Catcher)
- Reagan Heflin (NICH, JR, Right Field)
- Sophia Livers (NWST, SO, Center Field)
- Maddy Bailey (HCU, SR, Left Field)
- Maddie Taylor (McN, FR, Pitcher)

===== Weekly awards =====
Weekly honors
Honors	Player	Position	Date Awarded	Ref.
SLC Hitter of the Week	Veronica Harrison	INF	February 10, 2025	
SLC Pitcher of the Week	Madison Guidry	LHP	March 3, 2025	
SLC Pitcher of the Week	Mallory Pitre	RHP	April 7, 2025	

=== 2024 Lamar Lady Cardinals softball team ===
2024 Lamar Lady Cardinals softball
- Conference: Southland Conference
- Record: 26–25 (12–12 Southland)
- Head coach: Amy Hooks (6th season)
- Assistant coaches: Tara McKenney; Anthony Aresco; Kaitlin McFarland
- Home stadium: Lamar Softball Complex

2024 Southland Conference softball standings
	Conf.				Overall
Team	W		L	PCT	W		L	PCT
McNeese ‍†‍‍	22	–	2	.917	40	–	20	.667
Southeastern Louisiana ‍‍‡‍^{y}	17	–	7	.708	47	–	15	.758
Nicholls ‍‍‍	16	–	8	.667	31	–	26	.544
Incarnate Word ‍‍‍	14	–	9	.609	34	–	17	.667
Lamar ‍‍‍	12	–	12	.500	26	–	25	.510
Texas A&M–Corpus Christi ‍‍‍	9	–	15	.375	21	–	22	.488
Houston Christian ‍‍‍	9	–	15	.375	23	–	27	.460
Northwestern State ‍‍‍	5	–	18	.217	19	–	31	.380
Texas A&M–Commerce* ‍‍‍	2	–	22	.083	9	–	45	.167
† – Conference champion ‡ – Tournament champion y – Invited to the NCAA tournament * Ineligible for the 2024 NCAA tournament due to transition from Division II; As of May 19, 2024; Rankings from NFCA/USA Today

The 2024 Lamar Lady Cardinals softball team represented Lamar University during the 2024 NCAA Division I softball season. The Lady Cardinals played their home games at Lamar Softball Complex as a member of the Southland Conference and were led by head coach Amy Hooks in her sixth-year at Lamar. The team compiled a 26–25 overall record and a 12–12 record in conference play for a fifth place finish. As the fifth seeded team in the SLC tournament, the Lady Cardinals were defeated in extra innings by fourth seeded Incarnate Word 4–5^{8}. Their season ended with another extra inning defeat versus third seeded Nicholls 4–5^{8}.

==== Preseason ====
===== Early signing =====
On August 2, 2023, Lamar announced that five new players would join the team for the 2024 season.

Player	Position	Hometown	Previous Team
Trinity Brandon	Utility	Las Vegas, Nevada	Arbor View HS / San Diego State
Rose Gonzalez	Infielder	Dallas, Texas	South Grand Prairie HS / McLennan Community College
Sabrina Jolinhttps://duckduckgo.com/	Pitcher (RHP)	Anchorage, Alaska	South Anchorage HS / UNLV
Jane Sepuvelda	Infielder	Monterey Park, California	St. Paul High School / Southern Utah
Shenita Tucker	Outfield	Richmond, Texas	Lamar Consolidated HS / Florida SouthWestern

===== National signing day =====
On November 10, 2023, national signing day, Lamar announced that seven additional new players would join the team for the 2024 season.

Player	Position	Hometown	Previous Team
Ava Blakely	Outfielder/Infielder	Wesley Chapel, Florida	Wesley Chapel HS
Kaylee Cuevas	Pitcher/Utility	Teague, Texas	Teague HS
Neveah Hallmark	Outfielder/Utility	Pasadena, Texas	Pasadena HS
Cimara-lei Wessling	Catcher/Utility	Converse, Texas	Veterans Memorial HS
Ava Sanchez	Catcher/Outfielder	San Antonio, Texas	Brennan HS0
Cala Wilson	Pitcher/Infielder	Ruston, Louisiana	Ruston HS
Roxy Thompson	Infielder/Outfielder	[[Dallas, Te==== Roster ==== 2024 Lamar Lady Cardinals softball team Players Coaches: # / Pos. / Name / Bats/throws / Height / Year / Home town; 1 / OF / Mikaila Kenney / R/R / 5 ft 6 in (1.68 m) / Sr / Highland Village, Texas; 3 / INF / Kalie Amos / R/R / 5 ft 7 in (1.7 m) / So / Oklahoma City, Oklahoma; 5 / INF / Brooke Davis / R/R / 5 ft 5 in (1.65 m) / Sr / Keller, Texas; 7 / INF / Aubrey Brown / L/R / 5 ft 2 in (1.57 m) / Fr / Wylie, Texas; 8 / RHP / Makayla Valle / R/R / 5 ft 1 in (1.55 m) / Fr / Aurora, Colorado; 9 / LHP / Madison Guidry / L/L / 5 ft 6 in (1.68 m) / Fr / La Porte, Texas; 10 / INF / Rose Gonzales / R/R / 5 ft 7 in (1.7 m) / Jr / Grand Prairie, Texas; 11 / U / Kalyn Xayaseng / R/R / 5 ft 2 in (1.57 m) / Jr / Call, Texas; 13 / RHP / Cameron Niedenthal / R/R / 5 ft 11 in (1.8 m) / Sr / Port Neches, Texas; 15 / OF / Roxy Thompson / R/R / 5 ft 6 in (1.68 m) / Fr / Rockwall, Texas; 16 / INF / Jane Supulveda / R/R / 5 ft 7 in (1.7 m) / Jr / Monterey Park, California; 18 / RHP / Fadwa Ben Karim / R/R / 5 ft 8 in (1.73 m) / Sr / Milan Italy; 20 / INF / Sam Flores / R/R / 5 ft 3 in (1.6 m) / Fr / Humble, Texas; 21 / C / Emilee LaRue / R/R / 5 ft 9 in (1.75 m) / So / Blanco, Texas; 24 / U / Trinity Brandon / L/R / 5 ft 6 in (1.68 m) / So / Las Vegas, Nevada; 25 / INF / Veronica Harrison / R/R / 5 ft 4 in (1.63 m) / Fr / Alvin, Texas; 27 / RHP / Karyana Mitchell / R/R / 5 ft 8 in (1.73 m) / Sr / Palm Bay, Florida; 28 / RHP / Sabrina Jolin / R/R / 5 ft 6 in (1.68 m) / So / Anchorage, Alaska; 34 / RHP / Emma Wardlaw / R/R / 5 ft 10 in (1.78 m) / Fr / Comfort, Texas; 42 / OF / Shenita Tucker / L/R / 5 ft 0 in (1.52 m) / So / Richmond, Texas; 44 / C / Raigan Brannon / R/R / 5 ft 8 in (1.73 m) / Fr / Mansfield, Texas; 99 / C / Makenzie Wright / R/R / 5 ft 8 in (1.73 m) / Fr / Pearland, Texas; Head coach Amy Hooks (University of Texas at Austin) – 6th year Assistant coach(es) Tara McKenney (Northwestern State University) – 6th year Anthony Aresco (University of Mississippi) – 1st year Kaitlin McFarland (Liberty University) – 1st year Emily Rawlings – Graduate Asst. Legend: **(C)** Team captain; **(S)** Suspended; **(I)** Ineligible; Injured; Current redshirt; Roster; Last update: February 14, 2024 xas]]	Rockwall HS
Sicily Windham	Short-stop	Huntington Beach, California	Crean Lutheran HS

===== Southland Conference Coaches Poll =====
The Southland Conference Coaches Poll was released on February 2, 2024. Lamar was picked to finish fourth in the Southland Conference with 78 votes.

**Coaches poll**
Predicted finish	Team	Votes (1st place)
1	McNeese State	128 (16)
2	Southeastern Louisiana	114 (2)
3	Nicholls	97
**4**	**Lamar**	**78**
5	Texas A&M–Corpus Christi	72
6	Northwestern State	63
7	Houston Christian	49
8	Incarnate Word	30
9	Texas A&M–Commerce	17

===== Preseason All-Southland team =====
Brooke Davis and Cameron Niedenthal were named to the conference preseason second team.

====== First Team ======
- Lexi Johnson (SELA, SR, 1st Base)
- Erin Kraus (NICH, SO, 2nd Base)https://duckduckgo.com/
- Haylie Savage HCU, JR, 3rd Base)
- Reese Reyna (MCNS, JR, Shortstop)
- Bailey Krolczyk (SELA, SR, Catcher)
- Chloe Gomez (MCNS, SR, Utility)
- Audrey Greely (SELA, SR, Designated Player)
- Alexa Poche (NICH, SR, Outfielder)
- AB Garcia (HCU, SO, Outfielder)
- Erin Ardoin (MCNS, JR, Outfielder)
- Ashley Vallejo (MCNS, JR, Pitcher)
- Primrose Aholelei (TAMUCC, JR, Pitcher)

====== Second Team ======
- Crislyne Mareno (MCNS, JR, 1st Base)
- Mariana Torres (MCNS, JR, 2nd Base)
- Rylie Bouvier (MCNS, JR, 3rd Base)
- **Brooke Davis (LU, SR, Shortstop)**
- Ashlyn Walker (NWST, SR, Catcher)
- Sydney Hoyt (TAMUCC, SR, Utility)
- **Cameron Niedenthal (LU, SR, Designated Player)**
- Cam Goodman (SELU, SR, Outfielder)
- Ka'Lyn Watson (SELU, SR, Outfielder)
- Laney Roos (NWST, SR, Outfielder)
- Maggie Darr (NWST, SR, Pitcher)
- Shaelyn Sanders (MCNS, SR, Pitcher)

==== Roster ====
2024 Lamar Lady Cardinals softball team
Players
Coaches

#	Pos.	Name	Bats/throws	Height	Year	Home town
1	OF	Mikaila Kenney	R/R	5 ft 6 in (1.68 m)	Sr	Highland Village, Texas
3	INF	Kalie Amos	R/R	5 ft 7 in (1.7 m)	So	Oklahoma City, Oklahoma
5	INF	Brooke Davis	R/R	5 ft 5 in (1.65 m)	Sr	Keller, Texas
7	INF	Aubrey Brown	L/R	5 ft 2 in (1.57 m)	Fr	Wylie, Texas
8	RHP	Makayla Valle	R/R	5 ft 1 in (1.55 m)	Fr	Aurora, Colorado
9	LHP	Madison Guidry	L/L	5 ft 6 in (1.68 m)	Fr	La Porte, Texas
10	INF	Rose Gonzales	R/R	5 ft 7 in (1.7 m)	Jr	Grand Prairie, Texas
11	U	Kalyn Xayaseng	R/R	5 ft 2 in (1.57 m)	Jr	Call, Texas
13	RHP	Cameron Niedenthal	R/R	5 ft 11 in (1.8 m)	Sr	Port Neches, Texas
15	OF	Roxy Thompson	R/R	5 ft 6 in (1.68 m)	Fr	Rockwall, Texas
16	INF	Jane Supulveda	R/R	5 ft 7 in (1.7 m)	Jr	Monterey Park, California
18	RHP	Fadwa Ben Karim	R/R	5 ft 8 in (1.73 m)	Sr	Milan Italy
20	INF	Sam Flores	R/R	5 ft 3 in (1.6 m)	Fr	Humble, Texas
21	C	Emilee LaRue	R/R	5 ft 9 in (1.75 m)	So	Blanco, Texas
24	U	Trinity Brandon	L/R	5 ft 6 in (1.68 m)	So	Las Vegas, Nevada
25	INF	Veronica Harrison	R/R	5 ft 4 in (1.63 m)	Fr	Alvin, Texas
27	RHP	Karyana Mitchell	R/R	5 ft 8 in (1.73 m)	Sr	Palm Bay, Florida
28	RHP	Sabrina Jolin	R/R	5 ft 6 in (1.68 m)	So	Anchorage, Alaska
34	RHP	Emma Wardlaw	R/R	5 ft 10 in (1.78 m)	Fr	Comfort, Texas
42	OF	Shenita Tucker	L/R	5 ft 0 in (1.52 m)	So	Richmond, Texas
44	C	Raigan Brannon	R/R	5 ft 8 in (1.73 m)	Fr	Mansfield, Texas
99	C	Makenzie Wright	R/R	5 ft 8 in (1.73 m)	Fr	Pearland, Texas

Head coach

Amy Hooks (University of Texas at Austin) – 6th year

Assistant coach(es)

Tara McKenney (Northwestern State University) – 6th year
Anthony Aresco (University of Mississippi) – 1st year
Kaitlin McFarland (Liberty University) – 1st year
Emily Rawlings – Graduate Asst.

Legend

- **(C)** Team captain
- **(S)** Suspended
- **(I)** Ineligible
- Injured
- Current redshirt

Roster
Last update: February 14, 2024

=== Schedule and results ===
Legend
	Lamar win
	Lamar loss
	Postponement/cancellation
**Bold**	Lamar team member
*	Non-conference game
†	Make-up game

2024 Lamar Lady Cardinals Softball game log
Regular season (26–25)

February (9–6)
Date	Opponent	Rank	Site/stadium	Score	Win	Loss	Save	TV	Attendance	Overall record	SLC Record
Cowgirl Classic
Feb 9	vs. Tarleton State*		Joe Miller Field at Cowgirl Diamond • Lake Charles, LA	2–7	Rehmeier, Alexa (1–0)	**Jolin, Sabrina (0–1)**	Dunbar, Makenzie (1)			0–1	
Feb 10	vs. Tarleton State*		Joe Miller Field at Cowgirl Diamond • Lake Charles, LA	3–1	**Wardlaw, Emma (1–0)**	Daniel, Kendall (0–1)	None			1–1	
Feb 10	vs. Tennessee State*		Joe Miller Field at Cowgirl Diamond • Lake Charles, LA	5–9	Castillo, Reina (0–0)	**Ben Karim, Fadwa (0–1)**	None			1–2	
Feb 11	vs. Tennessee State*		Joe Miller Field at Cowgirl Diamond • Lake Charles, LA	7–1	**Makayla Valle (1–0)**	Ayala, Holly (0–0)	None			2–2	
Cowgirl Challenge
Feb 16	vs. Central Arkansas*		Joe Miller Field at Cowgirl Diamond • Lake Charles, LA	4–5	Bailie Runner (2–2)	**Wardlaw, Emma (1–1)**	None			2–3	
Feb 17	vs. Central Arkansas*		Joe Miller Field at Cowgirl Diamond • Lake Charles, LA	11–2	**Jolin, Sabrina (1–1)**	Paityn Engemann (0–1)	None			3–3	
Feb 17	vs. Oklahoma*	1	Joe Miller Field at Cowgirl Diamond • Lake Charles, LA	0–8	Deal, Kierston (1–0)	**Guidry, Madison (0–1)**	None			3–4	
Feb 18	at McNeese*		Joe Miller Field at Cowgirl Diamond • Lake Charles, LA	2–4	Schexnayder, Ryann (2–0)	**Wardlaw, Emma (1–2)**	Davis, Lindsay (1)		1,116	3–5	
Feb 20	at Texas Southern*		Memorial Park • Houston, TX	3–4	Maren Berger (2–0)	**Jolin, Sabrina (1–2)**			82	3–6	
Feb 20	at Texas Southern*		Memorial Park • Houston, TX	2–1	**Mitchell, Karyana (1–0)**	Lailah Bell (0–1)	**Valle, Makayla (1)**		65	4–6	
Lamar/McNeese Tournament
Feb 23	vs. Niagara*		Joe Miller Field at Cowgirl Diamond • Lake Charles, LA	6–1	**Mitchell, Karyana (2–0)**	Thompson, Julia (0–1)	None			5–6	
Feb 23	vs. North Dakota*		Joe Miller Field at Cowgirl Diamond • Lake Charles, LA	2–0	**Wardlaw, Emma (2–2)**	Albrecht, Jackie (0–5)	None			6–6	
Feb 25	Niagara*		Lamar Softball Complex • Beaumont, TX	3–2	**Wardlaw, Emma (3–2)**	Hickingbottom, Maddi (1–2)	**Mitchell, Karyana**	ESPN+	300	7–6	
Feb 25	Niagara*		Lamar Softball Complex • Beaumont, TX	0–11 (5 inn)	**Mitchell, Karyana (3–0)**	Leone, Cara (0–1)	None	ESPN+	300	8–6	
Feb 28	Southern*		Lamar Softball Complex • Beaumont, TX	6–2	**Jolin, Sabrina (2–2)**	J. Jennings (0–1)	None	ESPN+	200	9–6	

March (14–6)
Date	Opponent	Rank	Site/stadium	Score	Win	Loss	Save	TV	Attendance	Overall record	SLC Record
Mar 2	Penn*		Lamar Softball Complex • Beaumont, TX	1–0	**Wardlaw, Emma (4–2)**	Bean, Payton (0–1)	None	ESPN+	350	10–6	
Mar 2	Penn*		Lamar Softball Complex • Beaumont, TX	7–4	**Mitchell, Karyana (4–0)**	Riley, Rachel (0–3)	None	ESPN+	350	11–6	
Mar 3	Penn*		Lamar Softball Complex • Beaumont, TX	5–7	Utschig, Ella (2–1)	**Guidry, Madison (0–2)**	None	ESPN+	363	11–7	
Mar 5	Stephen F. Austin*		Lamar Softball Complex • Beaumont, TX	4–3	**Mitchell, Karyana (5–0)**	Aydenne Brown (1–4)	**Wardlaw, Emma (1)**	ESPN+	353	12–7	
Mar 9	at Houston Christian		Husky Field • Houston, TX	2–1	**Emma Wardlaw (5–2)**	R. Grofman (3–3)	None		250	13–7	1–0
Mar 9	at Houston Christian		Husky Field • Houston, TX	9–3	**Mitchell, Karyana (6–0)**	Swanson, L. (4–2)	None		250	14–7	2–0
Mar 10	at Houston Christian		Husky Field • Houston, TX	4–3	**Mitchell, Karyana (7–0)**	Grofman, R. (3–4)	None	ESPN+	250	15–7	3–0
Mar 12	at Baylor*	13	Getterman Stadium • Waco, TX	1–5	Kaci West (2–1)	**Jolin, Sabrina (2–3)**	None	ESPN+	917	15–8	
Mar 12	at Baylor*	13	Getterman Stadium • Waco, TX	1–6	Lexie Warncke (2–0)	**Guidry, Madison (0–3)**	None	ESPN+	998	15–9	
Mar 15	Northwestern State		Lamar Softball Complex • Beaumont, TX	6–5	**Mitchell, Karyana (8–0)**	Seely, Kenzie (5–9)	None	ESPN+	500	16–9	4–0
Mar 15	Northwestern State		Lamar Softball Complex • Beaumont, TX	1–6	Darr, Maggie (5–6)	**Mitchell, Karyana (8–1)**	None	ESPN+	400	16–10	4–1
Mar 16	Northwestern State		Lamar Softball Complex • Beaumont, TX	6–2	**Emma Wardlaw (6–2)**	Darr, Maggie (5–7))	None	ESPN+	500	17–10	5–1
Mar 19	Sam Houston*		Lamar Softball Complex • Beaumont, TX	3–2	**Wardlaw, Emma (6–2)**	Mika Vento (2–6)	None	ESPN+	291	18–10	
Mar 22	at Texas A&M–Commerce		John Cain Family Softball Complex • Commerce, TX	8–2	**Wardlaw, Emma (8–2)**	Sanchez, Julia (3–8)	None	ESPN+		19–10	6–1
Mar 22	at Texas A&M–Commerce		John Cain Family Softball Complex • Commerce, TX	10–0 (5 inn)	**Mitchell, Karyana (9–1)**	Muller, Maddie (2–12)	None	ESPN+	145	20–10	7–1
Mar 23	at Texas A&M–Commerce		John Cain Family Softball Complex • Commerce, TX	5–0	**Wardlaw, Emma (8–2)**	Martinez, Destiny (1–4)	**Mitchell, Karyana (2)**	ESPN+	219	21–10	8–1
Mar 26	at UTSA*		Roadrunner Field • San Antonio, TX	4–2	**Mitchell, Karyana (4–0)**	Iliana Saucedo (3–5)	None	ESPN+	194	22–10	8–1
Mar 28	Nicholls		Lamar Softball Complex • Beaumont, TX	1–4 (13 inn)	Paden, Averi (3–2)	**Mitchell, Karyana (10–2)**	None	ESPN+	400	22–11	8 –2
Mar 29	Nicholls		Lamar Softball Complex • Beaumont, TX	2–3	Paden, Averi (5–2)	**Mitchell, Karyana (10–3)**	None	ESPN+	400	22–12	8–3
Mar 29	Nicholls		Lamar Softball Complex • Beaumont, TX	2–0	**Jolin, Sabrina (3–3)**	McNeill, Audrey (8–10)	None	ESPN+	400	23–12	9–3

April (3–10)
Date	Opponent	Rank	Site/stadium	Score	Win	Loss	Save	TV	Attendance	Overall record	SLC Record
Apr 2	UTSA*		Lamar Softball Complex • Beaumont, TX	0–3	Reagan Smith (2–1)	**Jolin, Sabrina (3–4)**	None	ESPN+	200	23–13	
Apr 5	at McNeese		Joe Miller Field at Cowgirl Diamond • Lake Charles, LA	0–7	Sanders, Shaelyn (12–7)	**Wardlaw, Emma (9–3)**	None	ESPN+	758	23–14	9–4
Apr 6	at McNeese		Joe Miller Field at Cowgirl Diamond • Lake Charles, LA	2–6	Dibbley, Alexis (3–1)	**Mitchell, Karyana (10–4)**	None	ESPN+		23–15	9–5
Apr 6	at McNeese		Joe Miller Field at Cowgirl Diamond • Lake Charles, LA	3–6	Davis, Lindsay (5–5)	**Mitchell, Karyana (10–5)**	None	ESPN+	742	23–16	9–6
Apr 12	Texas A&M–Corpus Christi		Lamar Softball Complex • Beaumont, TX	2–4	Aholelei, Primrose (14–7)	**Wardlaw, Emma (9–4)**	None	ESPN+	300	23–17	9–7
Apr 12	Texas A&M–Corpus Christi		Lamar Softball Complex • Beaumont, TX	5–1	**Mitchell, Karyana (11–5)**	Saenz, Ariella (2–4)	None	ESPN+	587	24–17	10–7
Apr 13	Texas A&M–Corpus Christi		Lamar Softball Complex • Beaumont, TX	2–1	**Mitchell, Karyana (12–5)**	Aholelei, Primrose (14–8)	None	ESPN+	620	25–17	11–7
Apr 16	at Houston*		Cougar Softball Stadium • Houston, TX	7–15 (5 inn)	Edwards, Taylor (3–1)	**Jolin, Sabrina (3–5)**	Waiters, Tamya (1)	ESPN+	299	25–18	
Apr 19	Incarnate Word		Lamar Softball Complex • Beaumont, TX	2–4 (9 inn)	Larissa Jacquez (9–4)	**Wardlaw, Emma (9–5)**	None	ESPN+	500	25–19	11–8
Apr 19	Incarnate Word		Lamar Softball Complex • Beaumont, TX	0–8 (6 inn)	Samantha Portillo (7–3)	**Mitchell, Karyana (12–6)**	None	ESPN+	590	25–20	11–9
Apr 20	Incarnate Word		Lamar Softball Complex • Beaumont, TX	5–4	**Mitchell, Karyana (13–6)**	Samantha Portillo (7–4)	None	ESPN+	750	26–20	12–9
Apr 26	at Southeastern Louisiana		North Oak Park • Hammond, LA	1–9 (5 inn)	Blanchard, Cera (17–2)	**Wardlaw, Emma (9–6)**	None	ESPN+	205	26–21	12–10
Apr 26	at Southeastern Louisiana		North Oak Park • Hammond, LA	0–8 (5 inn)	DuBois, Ellie (13–4)	**Mitchell, Karyana (13–7)**	None	ESPN+	205	26–22	12–11
Apr 27	at Southeastern Louisiana		North Oak Park • Hammond, LA	0–10 (5 inn)	Comeaux, MC (5–3)	**Wardlaw, Emma (9–7)**	None	ESPN+	186	26–23	12–12

May (0–0)
Date	Opponent	Rank	Site/stadium	Score	Win	Loss	Save	TV	Attendance	Overall record	SLC Record
May 1	Tarleton State*		Lamar Softball Complex • Beaumont, TX			**Cancelled**					

Postseason (0–2)

Southland Tournament (0–2)
Date	Opponent	(Seed)/Rank	Site/stadium	Score	Win	Loss	Save	TV	Attendance	Overall record	Tournament record
May 7	vs. (4) Incarnate Word	(5)	North Oak Park • Hammond, LA	4–5 (8 inn)	Samantha Portillo (9–6)	**Mitchell, Karyana (13–8)**	None	ESPN+	322	26–24	0–1
May 8	vs. (3) Nicholls	(5)	North Oak Park • Hammond, LA	4–5 (8 inn)	Yoo, Molly(8–9)	**Mitchell, Karyana (13–9)**	None	ESPN+	322	26–25	0–2

–

Schedule source:

*Rankings are based on the team's current ranking in the NFCA/USA Softball poll.

==== Conference awards and honors ====
===== Post-season All-Southland Conference Teams =====
Shenita Tucker was named Newcomer of the Year. No Lady Cardinals were named to either the first or second teams.

Player of the Year: Victoria Altamirano, UIW

Hitter of the Year: Ka'Lyn Watson, Southeastern

Pitcher of the Year: Shaelyn Sanders, McNeese

Freshman of the Year: Alexis Dibbley, McNeese

Newcomer of the Year: Shenita Tucker, Lamar

Coach of the Year: James Landreneau, McNeese

====== First Team ======
- Corine Poncho (MCNS, SO, 1st Base)
- Mariana Torres (MCNS, SR, 2nd Base)
- Chloe Magee (SELA, FR, Shortstop)
- Maddison Guillen (UIW, SR, 3rd Base)
- Bailey Krolczyk (SELA, SR, Catcher)
- Victoria Altamirano (UIW, SO, Utility)
- Audrey Greely (SELA, SR, Designated Player)
- Reagan Heflin (NICH, SO, Outfielder)
- Ka'Lyn Watson (SELA, SR, Outfielder)
- Alexis Dibbley (MCNS, FR, Outfielder)
- Cera Blanchard (SELA, SR, Pitcher)
- Shaelyn Sanders (MCNS, SR, Pitcher)

====== Second Team ======
- Lexi Johnson (SELA, SR, 1st Base)
- Ryleigh Mata (UIW, JR, 2nd Base)
- Baylee Lemons (UIW, JR, Shortstop)
- Rylie Bouvier (MCNS, JR, 3rd Base)
- Bella Perez (MCNS, FR, Catcher)
- Haylie Savage (HCU, JR, Utility)
- Crislyne Moreno (MCNS, JR, Designated Player)
- Jillian Guiterrez (UIW, SO, Outfield)
- Abby Andersen (NICH, SR, Outfield)
- Cam Goodman (SELA, SR, Outfield)
- Primrose Aholelei (TAMUCC, SR, Pitcher)
- Ellie DuBois (SELA, SR, Pitcher)

==== Weekly awards ====
Weekly honors
Honors	Player	Position	Date Awarded	Ref.
SLC Pitcher of the Week	Karyana Mitchell	RHP	February 26, 2024	

=== 2023 Lamar Lady Cardinals softball team ===
2023 Lamar Lady Cardinals softball
- Conference: Southland Conference
- Record: 22–34 (12–12 Southland)
- Head coach: Amy Hooks (5th season)
- Assistant coach: Tara McKenney
- Home stadium: Lamar Softball Complex; Beaumont, Texas

2023 Southland Conference softball standings
	Conf.						Overall
Team	W		L		T	PCT	W		L		T	PCT
McNeese ‍†‍‡‍^{y}	21	–	3	–	0	.875	47	–	16	–	0	.746
Southeastern Louisiana ‍‍‍	19	–	5	–	0	.792	47	–	14	–	0	.770
Nicholls ‍‍‍	13	–	11	–	0	.542	29	–	24	–	0	.547
Lamar ‍‍‍	12	–	12	–	0	.500	22	–	34	–	0	.393
Texas A&M–Corpus Christi ‍‍‍	11	–	13	–	0	.458	24	–	24	–	0	.500
Northwestern State ‍‍‍	10	–	14	–	0	.417	25	–	27	–	0	.481
Houston Christian ‍‍‍	9	–	15	–	0	.375	20	–	33	–	0	.377
Incarnate Word ‍‍‍	8	–	16	–	0	.333	16	–	30	–	1	.351
Texas A&M–Commerce* ‍‍‍	5	–	19	–	0	.208	9	–	39	–	0	.188
† – Conference champion ‡ – Tournament champion y – Invited to the NCAA tournament * Ineligible for the 2023 NCAA tournament due to transition from Division II; As of May 21, 2023; Rankings from NFCA/USA Today

The 2023 Lamar Lady Cardinals softball team represented Lamar University in Beaumont, Texas, during the 2023 NCAA Division I softball season. The Lady Cardinals played their home games at Lamar Softball Complex and were led by fifth-year head coach Amy Hooks. The 2023 season marked Lamar's return to the Southland Conference following one season as a member of the Western Athletic Conference.

==== Preseason ====
===== Early signing =====
On September 2, 2022, Lamar announced that seven new players would join the team for the 2023 season.

Player	Position	Hometown	Previous Team
Mikaila (Kay Kay) Kenney	Outfielder	Highland Village, Texas	Marcus HS / Marshall
Julia Kramer	Infielder	Prairieville, Louisiana	St. Amant HS / Nicholls
Emilee LaRue	Catcher	San Antonio, Texas	Blanco HS
Rien Milliken	Infielder	Victoria, British Columbia Canada	Lambrick Park Secondary School / Utah Valley
Karyana Mitchell	Pitcher	Palm Bay, Florida	Viera HS / UNC Charlotte
Cameron Niedenthal	Infielder/Pitcher	Port Neches, Texas	Port Neches–Groves HS /Lamar State College–Port Arthur

===== National signing day =====
On November 10, 2022, National signing day, Lamar announced that ten additional new players would join the team for the 2023 season.

Player	Position	Hometown	Previous Team
Raigan Alexis Brannon	Catcher/Infielder	Mansfield, Texas	Lake Ridge HS
Aubrey Brown	Infielder/Utility	Wylie, Texas	Wylie HS
Sam Flores	Infielder	Humble, Texas	Summer Creek HS
Madison Guidry	Pitcher	La Porte, Texas	La Porte HS
Veronica "Roni" Harrison	Infielder	Alvin, Texas	Alvin HS
Lainie Schaefer	Infielder/Outfielder	Houston, Texas	Friendswood HS
Roxy Thompson	Infielder/Outfielder	Dallas, Texas	Rockwall HS
Makayla Valle	Pitcher/Utility	Aurora, Colorado	Grandview HS
Emma Wardlaw	Pitcher	Comfort, Texas	Comfort HS
Makenzie Wright	Pitcher	Pearland, Texas	Pearland HS

===== Southland Conference Coaches Poll =====
The Southland Conference Coaches Poll was released on January 26, 2023. Lamar was picked to finish sixth in the Southland Conference with 49 votes.

**Coaches poll**
Predicted finish	Team	Votes (1st place)
1	McNeese State	128 (16)
2	Southeastern Louisiana	113 (2)
3	Northwestern State	91
4	Texas A&M–Corpus Christi	85
5	Houston Christian	58
**6**	**Lamar**	**49**
7	Texas A&M–Commerce	47
8	Incarnate Word	45
9	Nicholls	32

===== Preseason All-Southland team =====
No Lady Cardinals were named to conference preseason teams.

====== First Team ======
- Crislyne Moreno (MCNS, SO, 1st Base)
- Caleigh Cross (MCNS, SR, 2nd Base)
- Jil Poullard (MCNS, JR, 3rd Base)
- Maddie Watson (SELA, SO, Shortstop)
- Bailey Krolczyk (SELA, JR, Catcher)
- Kaylee Lopez (MCNS, SR, Utility)
- Audrey Greely (SELA, JR, Designated Player)
- Laney Roos (NSU, JR, Outfielder)
- Alayis Seneca (MCNS, SR, Outfielder)
- Cam Goodman (SELA, JR, Outfielder)
- Ashley Vallejo (MCNS, JR, Pitcher)
- Bronte Rhoden (NSU, SR, Pitcher)

====== Second Team ======
- Sydney Hoyt (TAMUCC, JR, 1st Base)
- Madison Rayner (SELA, SR, 2nd Base)
- Haylie Savage (HCU, SO, 3rd Base)
- Ryleigh Mata (UIW, SO, Shortstop)
- Tristin Court (NSU, JR, Catcher)
- Melise Gossen (NICH, SR, Utility)
- Chloe Gomez (MCNS, JR, Designated Player)
- Alexa Poche (NICH, JR, Outfielder)
- Makenzie Chaffin (NSU, JR, Outfielder)
- Bailie Ragsdale (NSU, SO, Outfielder)
- Lyndie Swanson (HCU, JR, Pitcher)
- Siarah Galvan (TAMUCC, SO, Pitcher)

==== Roster ====
2023 Lamar Lady Cardinals softball team
Players
Coaches

#	Pos.	Name	Bats/throws	Height	Year	Home town
00	U	Olivia Taylor	R/R	5 ft 3 in (1.6 m)	Sr	College Station, Texas
1	OF	Mikaila Kenney	R/R	5 ft 6 in (1.68 m)	Jr	Highland Village, Texas
2	INF	Nicolette Ramirez	R/R	5 ft 4 in (1.63 m)	Jr	San Antonio, Texas
3	INF	Kalie Amos	R/R	5 ft 7 in (1.7 m)	Fr	Oklahoma City, Oklahoma
5	INF	Brooke Davis	R/R	5 ft 5 in (1.65 m)	Jr	Keller, Texas
6	OF	Audrey Fleming	R/R	5 ft 5 in (1.65 m)	Jr	Haslet, Texas
8	OF	Aleka Xayaseng	L/R	5 ft 2 in (1.57 m)	Sr	Call, Texas
10	U	Hayley Freudenberg	R/R	5 ft 2 in (1.57 m)	Jr	Baytown, Texas
11	U	Kalyn Xayaseng	R/R	5 ft 2 in (1.57 m)	So	Call, Texas
13	RHP	Cameron Niedenthal	R/R	5 ft 11 in (1.8 m)	Jr	Port Neches, Texas
15	RHP	Kelsey Pizarro	R/R	5 ft 4 in (1.63 m)	Fr	Rio Hondo, Texas
17	INF	Sydnee Adams	L/R	5 ft 5 in (1.65 m)	Jr	Port Neches, Texas
18	RHP	Fadwa Ben Karim	R/R	5 ft 8 in (1.73 m)	Jr	Milan Italy
19	C	Estela Garza	R/R	5 ft 3 in (1.6 m)	Fr	Baytown, Texas
21	C	Emilee LaRue	R/R	5 ft 9 in (1.75 m)	Fr	Blanco, Texas
22	INF	Kaylee Ancelot	R/R	5 ft 7 in (1.7 m)	GS	Orangefield, Texas
24	C	Sam Bean	R/R	5 ft 6 in (1.68 m)	Sr	Rockwall, Texas
27	RHP	Karyana Mitchell	R/R	5 ft 8 in (1.73 m)	Jr	Palm Bay, Florida
30	INF	Rien Milliken	R/R	5 ft 6 in (1.68 m)	GS	Victoria, BC Canada
49	C	Felixia Hinojosa	R/R	5 ft 5 in (1.65 m)	Jr	Beeville, Texas
50	RHP	Aaliyah Ruiz	R/R	5 ft 5 in (1.65 m)	GS	Beeville, Texas
59	INF	Sydney Norton	R/R	5 ft 4 in (1.63 m)	So	Schertz, Texas

Head coach

Amy Hooks – 5th year

Assistant coach(es)

Tara McKenney – 5th year
Anthony Aresco – 1st year

Legend

- **(C)** Team captain
- **(S)** Suspended
- **(I)** Ineligible
- Injured
- Current redshirt

Roster
Last update: January 31, 2023

==== Schedule and results ====
Legend
	Lamar win
	Lamar loss
	Postponement/Cancellation
**Bold**	Lamar team member
*	Non-Conference game
†	Make-Up Game

2023 Lamar Lady Cardinals Softball Game Log
Regular season (22–34)

February (3–15)
Date	Opponent	Rank	Site/stadium	Score	Win	Loss	Save	TV	Attendance	Overall record	SLC Record
Houston Invitational
Feb 9	vs. Virginia*		Cougar Softball Complex • Houston, TX	0–5	E. Bigham (1–0)	**Ruiz, Aaliyah (0–1)**		MaxxSportsTV		0–1	
Feb 10	vs. Nebraska*		Cougar Softball Complex • Houston, TX	0–8	Wallace (1–0)	**Mitchell, Karyana (0–1)**		MaxxSportsTV		0–2	
Feb 10	at Houston*		Cougar Softball Complex • Houston, TX	1–9	EDWARDS, Taylor (1–0)	**Ruiz, Aaliyah (0–2)**		ESPN+	463	0–3	
Feb 11	vs Virginia*		Cougar Softball Complex • Houston, TX	1–4	J. Bressler (1–0)	**Mitchell, Karyana (0–2)**	E. Bigham (2)	MaxxSportsTV		0–4	
Feb 11	vs Nebraska*		Cougar Softball Complex • Houston, TX	0–7	Harness (1–0)	**Ruiz, Aaliyah (0–3)**		MaxxSportsTV		0–5	
Feb 15	at Texas*		Red and Charline McCombs Field • Austin, TX	2–8	Gutierrez, Citlaly (1–0)	**Ruiz, Aaliyah (0–4)**		LHN	1,297	0–6	
I-35 Tournament
Feb 16	at Texas State*		Bobcat Softball Stadium • San Marcos, TX	0–9	McCann, Tori (1–1)	**Mitchell, Karyana (0–3)**			361	0–7	
Feb 17	vs. Abilene Christian*		Roadrunner Field • San Antonio, TX	6–4	**Mitchell, Karyana (1–3)**	Rote, E. (0–2)				1–7	
Feb 17	at UTSA*		Roadrunner Field •San Antonio, TX	12–13	GILBERT, Jamie (1–1)	**Mitchell, Karyana (1–4)**				1–8	
Feb 18	vs. Abilene Christian*		Bobcat Softball Stadium • San Marcos, TX	5–11	White, R. (1–1)	**Mitchell, Karyana (0–4)**				1–9	
Feb 19	at UTSA*		Roadrunner Field • San Antonio, TX	11–7	**Niedenthal, Cameron (1–0)**	ESTELL, Marena (1–1)			265	2–9	
Feb 21	at Stephen F. Austin*		SFA Softball Field • Nacogdoches, TX	3–2	**Mitchell, Karyana (2–5)**	A. Telford (3–4)		ESPN+		3–9	
Feb 21	at Stephen F. Austin*		SFA Softball Field • Nacogdoches, TX	4–6	S. Hannabas (2–2)	**Ben Karim, Fadwa (0–1)**	B. Gainous (1)	ESPN+		3–10	
Unconquered Invitational
Feb 24	vs. Troy*		JoAnne Graf Field at the Seminole Softball Complex • Tallahassee, FL	0–8 (5 inn)	Cato, Olivia (2–1)	**Ruiz, Aaliyah (0–5)**				3–11	
Feb 24	at Florida State*	6	JoAnne Graf Field at the Seminole Softball Complex • Tallahassee, FL	0–4	Ali DuBois (2–1)	**Ben Karim, Fadwa (0–2)**		ACCNX		3–12	
Feb 25	vs. FGCU*		JoAnne Graf Field at the Seminole Softball Complex • Tallahassee, FL	0–7	HULME, Ally (4–4)	**Mitchell, Karyana (2–6)**				3–13	
Feb 25	at Florida State*	6	JoAnne Graf Field at the Seminole Softball Complex • Tallahassee, FL	3–11	Royalty (5–0)	**Ruiz, Aaliyah (0–6)**	Wilson (1)		1,351	3–14	
Feb 26	vs. Troy*		JoAnne Graf Field at the Seminole Softball Complex • Tallahassee, FL	0–2	Johnson, Leanna (7–1)	**Mitchell, Karyana (2–7)**				3–15	

March (7–9)
Date	Opponent	Rank	Site/stadium	Score	Win	Loss	Save	TV	Attendance	Overall record	SLC Record
Mar 1	at Tarleton State Texans*		Tarleton Softball Complex • Stephenville, TX	4–8	Garcia, Grace (6–1)	**Mitchell, Karyana (2–8)**		ESPN+	316	3–16	
Boerner Invitational
Mar 3	vs Rider*		Allan Saxe Field • Arlington, TX	9–1	**Ruiz, Aaliyah (1–6)**	Stoeckel, F. (2–1)				4–16	
Mar 3	vs. UMKC*		Allan Saxe Field • Arlington, TX	5–4	**Mitchell, Karyana(3–8)**	Camryn Stickel(1–4)				5–16	
Mar 4	vs. UMKC*		Allan Saxe Field • Arlington, TX	3–2	**Ruiz, Aaliyah (2–6)**	Katie Noble (1–3)			372	6–16	
Mar 4	vs. Rider*		Allan Saxe Field • Arlington, TX	0–1	Schmierer, Kathryn(1–1)	**Mitchell, Karyana(3–9)**			315	6–17	
Mar 5	at UT Arlington*		Allan Saxe Field • Arlington, TX	2–0	**Niedenthal, Cameron (2–0)**	Bumpurs, Gracie (3–4)			388	7–17	
Mar 8	at Sam Houston*		Bearkat Softball Complex • Huntsville, TX	1–3	GUIDON, E. (2–2)	**Niedenthal, Cameron (2–1)**			302	7–18	
Mar 11	at Northwestern State		Lady Demon Diamond • Natchitoches, LA	8–2	**Mitchell, Karyana (4–9)**	Darr, Maggie (6–4)		ESPN+	248	8–18	1–0
Mar 11	at Northwestern State		Lady Demon Diamond • Natchitoches, LA	4–5	Seely, Kenzie (3–1)	**Niedenthal, Cameron (2–2)**		ESPN+	246	8–19	1–1
Mar 12	at Northwestern State		Lady Demon Diamond • Natchitoches, LA	6–1	**Ruiz, Aaliyah (3–6)**	Denton, Ryleigh (2–3)		ESPN+	187	9–19	2–1
Mar 17	Southeastern Louisiana		Lamar Softball Complex • Beaumont, TX	2–6	Ladner, KK (1–0)	**Niedenthal, Cameron (2–3)**		ESPN+	422	9–20	2–2
Mar 17	Southeastern Louisiana		Lamar Softball Complex • Beaumont, TX	7–14	Blanchard, Cera (10–3)	**Ruiz, Aaliyah (3–7)**		ESPN+	422	9–21	2–3
Mar 18	Southeastern Louisiana		Lamar Softball Complex • Beaumont, TX	6–2	**Ruiz, Aaliyah (4–7)**	Comeaux, MC (3–2)		ESPN+	402	10–21	3–3
Mar 21	Texas Southern*		Lamar Softball Complex • Beaumont, TX	Cancelled							
Mar 28	at Texas A&M*	21	Davis Diamond • College Station, TX	2–3	Leavitt, Emily (7–4)	**Niedenthal, Cameron (2–4)**		SECN+	1,073	10–22	
Mar 31	McNeese		Lamar Softball Complex • Beaumont, TX	4–7	Vallejo, Ashley (7–7)	**Mitchell, Karyana (4–10)**	Tate, Whitney (1)	ESPN+	410	10–23	3–4
Mar 31	McNeese		Lamar Softball Complex • Beaumont, TX	2–4	Sanders, Shaelyn (4–0)	**Ruiz, Aaliyah (4–8)**	Davis, Lindsay (3)	ESPN+	394	10–24	3–5

April (7–8)
Date	Opponent	Rank	Site/stadium	Score	Win	Loss	Save	TV	Attendance	Overall record	SLC Record
Apr 1	McNeese		Lamar Softball Complex • Beaumont, TX	0–12 (5 inn)	Tate, Whitney (12–2)	**Niedenthal, Cameron (2–5)**		ESPN+	455	10–25	3–6
Apr 5	at Southern*		Lady Jaguar Field • Baton Rouge, LA	1–2	Raquel Latta (3–4)	**Ruiz, Aaliyah (4–9)**	Kairah Williams (1)		43	10–26	
Apr 6	at Nicholls		Swanner Field at Geo Surfaces Park • Thibodaux, LA	4–5	McNeill, Audrey (8–6)	**Niedenthal, Cameron (2–6)**		ESPN+	87	10–27	3–7
Apr 6	at Nicholls		Swanner Field at Geo Surfaces Park • Thibodaux, LA	10–0 (5 inn)	**Ruiz, Aaliyah (5–9)**	Yoo, Molly (10–6)		ESPN+	87	11–27	4–7
Apr 7	at Nicholls		Swanner Field at Geo Surfaces Park • Thibodaux, LA	0–1	McNeill, Audrey (9–6)	**Ruiz, Aaliyah (5–10)**		ESPN+	66	11–28	4–8
Apr 14	at Texas A&M–Corpus Christi		Chapman Field • Corpus Christi, TX	0–1	Aholelei, Primrose (14–9)	**Ruiz, Aaliyah (5–11)**		ESPN+		11–29	4–9
Apr 14	at Texas A&M–Corpus Christi		Chapman Field • Corpus Christi, TX	3–2	**Mitchell, Karyana (5–10)**	Hoyt, Sydney (2–4)		ESPN+		12–29	5–9
Apr 15	at Texas A&M–Corpus Christi		Chapman Field • Corpus Christi, TX	1–5	Aholelei, Primrose (15–9)	**Niedenthal, Cameron (2–7)**		ESPN+	279	12–30	5–10
Apr 21	Houston Christian		Lamar Softball Complex • Beaumont, TX	3–2	**Ruiz, Aaliyah (6–11)**	Janes, Katy (6–10)		ESPN+	445	13–30	6–10
Apr 21	Houston Christian		Lamar Softball Complex • Beaumont, TX	2–6 (9 inn)	Swanson, Lyndie (9–6)	**Niedenthal, Cameron (2–8)**		ESPN+	463	12–31	6–11
Apr 22	Houston Christian		Lamar Softball Complex • Beaumont, TX	4–3	**Ruiz, Aaliyah (6–10)**	Grofman, Ronni (5–3)		ESPN+	500	13–31	7–11
Apr. 25	Texas Southern*		Lamar Softball Complex • Beaumont, TX	3–1	**Ruiz, Aaliyah (8–11)**	Melonie Guardiola (2–5)		ESPN+	542	14–31	
Apr 28	at Incarnate Word		H-E-B Field • San Antonio, TX	9–0 (5 inn)	**Ruiz, Aaliyah (9–11)**	GUNTHER, A (0–0)		ESPN+	52	15–31	8–11
Apr 28	at Incarnate Word		H-E-B Field • San Antonio, TX	8–1	**Ruiz, Aaliyah (10–11)**	GARCIA, A (0–0)		ESPN+	72	16–31	9–11
Apr 29	at Incarnate Word		H-E-B Field • San Antonio, TX	0–9 (5 inn)	FLOYD, M (3–6)	**Mitchell, Karyana (5–11)**		ESPN+	145	17–32	9–12

May (3–0)
Date	Opponent	Rank	Site/stadium	Score	Win	Loss	Save	TV	Attendance	Overall record	SLC Record
May 5	Texas A&M–Commerce		Lamar Softball Complex • Beaumont, TX	7–0	**Ruiz, Aaliyah (11–11)**	Sanchez, J. (7–14)		ESPN+	300	18–32	10–12
May 5	Texas A&M–Commerce		Lamar Softball Complex • Beaumont, TX	6–4	**Ruiz, Aaliyah (12–11)**	Sanchez, J. (7–15)		ESPN+	397	19–32	11–12
May 6	Texas A&M–Commerce		Lamar Softball Complex • Beaumont, TX	2–1	**Ruiz, Aaliyah (13–11)**	Sanchez, J. (7–16)		ESPN+	397	20–32	12–12

Postseason (2–2)

Southland Tournament (2–2)
Date	Opponent	(Seed)/Rank	Site/stadium	Score	Win	Loss	Save	TV	Attendance	Overall record	Tournament record
May 9	vs. (5) Texas A&M–Corpus Christi	(4)	Joe Miller Field at Cowgirl Diamond • Lake Charles, LA	2–3	Aholelei, Primrose (19–12)	Ruiz, Aaliyah (13–12)		ESPN+		20–31	0–1
May 11	vs. (6) Northwestern State	(4)	Joe Miller Field at Cowgirl Diamond • Lake Charles, LA	5–4	**Ruiz, Aaliyah (13–11)**	Darr, Maggie (12–10)	**Ben Karim, Fadwa (1)**	ESPN+		21–33	1–1
May 12	vs. (3) Nicholls	(4)	Joe Miller Field at Cowgirl Diamond • Lake Charles, LA	5–4	**Ruiz, A (15–12)**	Yoo, Molly (13–12)		ESPN+		23–33	2–1
May 12	vs. (2) Southeastern Louisiana	(4)	Joe Miller Field at Cowgirl Diamond • Lake Charles, LA	0–8 (5 inn)	DuBois, Ellie (3–0)	**Ruiz, Aaliyah (15–13)**		ESPN+	363	22–34	2–2

–

Schedule source:

*Rankings are based on the team's current ranking in the NFCA/USA Softball poll.

=== 2022 Lamar Lady Cardinals softball team ===
2022 Lamar Lady Cardinals softball
- Conference: Western Athletic Conference
- Record: 11–38 (5–19 WAC)
- Head coach: Amy Hooks (4th season)
- Assistant coaches: Tara McKenney; Anthony Aresco
- Home stadium: Lamar Softball Complex

2022 Western Athletic Conference softball standings
	Conf.				Overall
Team	W		L	PCT	W		L	PCT
Southwest Division
Stephen F. Austin ^{x}‍‍‍	18	–	6	.750	31	–	27	.534
Abilene Christian ‍‍‍	15	–	9	.625	25	–	26	.490
Tarleton State ‍‍‍	14	–	10	.583	30	–	25	.545
Sam Houston State ‍‍‍	8	–	16	.333	15	–	39	.278
Lamar ‍‍‍	5	–	19	.208	11	–	38	.224
West Division
Grand Canyon ^{x}‍‍‡‍^{y}	19	–	5	.792	39	–	16	.709
Seattle ‍‍‍	15	–	9	.625	32	–	24	.571
California Baptist ‍‍‍	12	–	12	.500	30	–	26	.536
Utah Valley ‍‍‍	12	–	12	.500	24	–	27	.471
Dixie State ‍‍‍	8	–	16	.333	19	–	32	.373
New Mexico State ‍‍‍	6	–	18	.250	13	–	38	.255
x – Division champion ‡ – Tournament champion y – Invited to the NCAA tournament As of June 5, 2022; Rankings from NFCA/USA Today

The 2022 Lamar Lady Cardinals softball team represented Lamar University during the 2022 NCAA Division I softball season. The Lady Cardinals played their home games at Lamar Softball Complex and were led by fourth-year head coach Amy Hooks. The 2022 season marked Lamar's move from the Southland Conference to the Western Athletic Conference. Lamar returned to the Southland conference after one season in the WAC.

==== Preseason ====
===== Western Athletic Conference Coaches Poll =====
The Western Athletic Conference Coaches Poll was released on February 3, 2022. Lamar was picked to finish sixth in the Western Athletic Conference Southwest Division with 4 votes.

2022 WAC Softball Preseason Coaches Poll

West Division
Seattle U (5) – 25
NM State (1) – 20
Grand Canyon – 16
Dixie State – 13
California Baptist – 9
Utah Valley – 7

Southwest Division
Stephen F. Austin (4) – 16
Sam Houston (1) – 13
Abilene Christian – 9
Tarleton – 8
Lamar – 4

() – First place votes in parentheses

===== Preseason All-WAC team =====
No Lady Cardinals were named to conference preseason teams.

==== Roster ====
2022 Lamar Lady Cardinals softball team
Players
Coaches

#	Pos.	Name	Bats/throws	Height	Year	Home town
00	U	Olivia Taylor	R/R	5 ft 3 in (1.6 m)	Jr	College Station, Texas
1	OF	Piper Hankins	L/R	5 ft 3 in (1.6 m)	Fr	Euless, Texas
2	INF	Nicolette Ramirez	R/R	5 ft 4 in (1.63 m)	Jr	San Antonio, Texas
3	C	Maya Mongelli	R/R	5 ft 7 in (1.7 m)	Fr	Lubbock, Texas
4	INF	Hannah Kinkade	R/R	5 ft 6 in (1.68 m)	Jr	Schertz, Texas
5	INF	Brooke Davis	R/R	5 ft 5 in (1.65 m)	So	Keller, Texas
6	OF	Audrey Fleming	R/R	5 ft 5 in (1.65 m)	So	Haslet, Texas
7	U	Reagan Jones	R/R	5 ft 2 in (1.57 m)	So	Pearland, Texas
8	OF	Aleka Xayaseng	L/R	5 ft 2 in (1.57 m)	Sr	Call, Texas
10	U	Hayley Freudenberg	R/R	5 ft 2 in (1.57 m)	So	Baytown, Texas
11	U	Kalyn Xayaseng	R/R	5 ft 2 in (1.57 m)	Fr	Call, Texas
15	RHP	Kelsey Pizarro	R/R	5 ft 4 in (1.63 m)	Fr	Rio Hondo, Texas
17	INF	Sydnee Adams	L/R	5 ft 5 in (1.65 m)	So	Port Neches, Texas
19	RHP	Janelle Marwitz	R/R	5 ft 7 in (1.7 m)	So	Oklahoma City, Oklahoma
20	RHP	Haila Linton	R/R	6 ft 0 in (1.83 m)	Fr	Rio Vista, Texas
22	INF	Kaylee Ancelot	R/R	5 ft 7 in (1.7 m)	Sr	Orangefield, Texas
24	C	Sam Bean	R/R	5 ft 6 in (1.68 m)	So	Rockwall, Texas
25	RHP	Shelby Mixon	R/R	5 ft 9 in (1.75 m)	Sr	Woodville, Texas
33	LHP	Hannah Williams	L/L	5 ft 3 in (1.6 m)	So	Whitewright, Texas
49	C	Felixia Hinojosa	R/R	5 ft 5 in (1.65 m)	Jr	Beeville, Texas
50	RHP	Aaliyah Ruiz	R/R	5 ft 5 in (1.65 m)	Sr	Beeville, Texas
59	INF	Sydney Norton	R/R	5 ft 4 in (1.63 m)	Fr	Schertz, Texas
76	INF	Cassie Blevins	R/R	5 ft 3 in (1.6 m)	Fr	Bulverde, Texas
88	RHP	Breanna Reyna	R/R	5 ft 6 in (1.68 m)	So	Corpus Christi, Texas

Head coach

Amy Hooks – 4th year

Assistant coach(es)

Tara McKenney – 4th year
Anthony Aresco – 1st year

Legend

- **(C)** Team captain
- **(S)** Suspended
- **(I)** Ineligible
- Injured
- Current redshirt

Roster
Last update: February 5, 2024

WAC Digital Network

==== Schedule and results ====
Legend		−0	Lamar win
	Lamar loss		
	Postponement/Cancellation		
**Bold**	Lamar team member		
*	Non-Conference game		
†	Make-Up Game		

2022 Lamar Lady Cardinals Softball Game Log
Regular season (11–37)

February (4–11)
Date	Opponent	Rank	Site/Stadium	Score	Win	Loss	Save	TV	Attendance	Overall Record	WAC Record
Puerto Vallarta Challenge
Feb 10	vs Memphis*		Nancy Almaraz Field • Puerto Vallarta, Mexico	3–1	**Ruiz, Aaliyah (1–0)**	Hallie_Siems (0–1)	**Mixon, Shelby (1)**		412	1–0	
Feb 10	vs Washington*	#7	Nancy Almaraz Field • Puerto Vallarta, Mexico	2–12	Nelson, Broo (1–0)	**Mixon, Shelby (0–1)**	None		706	1–1	
Feb 11	vs Rutgers*		Nancy Almaraz Field • Puerto Vallarta, Mexico	1–2	Vickers, Jaden (1–0)	**Ruiz, Aaliyah (1–1)**	Hitchcock, Ashley (1)			1–2	
Feb 12	vs Rutgers*		Nancy Almaraz Field • Puerto Vallarta, Mexico	2–6	Vickers, J (2–0)	**Linton, Haila (0–1)**	None			1–3	
Feb 11	vs Long Beach State*		Nancy Almaraz Field • Puerto Vallarta, Mexico	2–5	Fowler (1–1)	**Ruiz, Aaliyah (1–2)**	Frutoz (1)			1–4	
Cardinal Classic
Feb 18	Creighton*		Lamar Softball Complex • Beaumont, TX	7–8	Jena Lawrence (1–1)	**Mixon, Shelby (0–2)**	Alexis Wiggins (1)		150	1–5	
Feb 18	New Mexico*		Lamar Softball Complex • Beaumont, TX	1–2	LINTON, Amber (2–1)	**Linton, Haila (0–2)**	None		120	1–6	
Feb 19	Ohio*		Lamar Softball Complex • Beaumont, TX	2–7	Kohl, Mackensie (1–1)	**Linton, Haila (0–3)**	None		240	1–7	
Feb 19	New Mexico*		Lamar Softball Complex • Beaumont, TX	4–6	LINTON, Amber (3–1)	**Ruiz, Aaliyah (1–3)**	None		200	1–8	
Feb 20	Creighton*		Lamar Softball Complex • Beaumont, TX	7–5 (6 inn)	**Ruiz, Aaliyah (2–3)**	Mikayla Santa Cruz (2–1)	None		150	2–8	
Houston Tournament
Feb 25	vs Texas A&M–Corpus Christi*		Cougar Softball Stadium • Houston, TX	5–3	**Linton, Haila (1–3)**	Gilbert, Grace (1–3)	**Ruiz, Aaliyah (1)**			3–8	
Feb 25	at Houston*		Cougar Softball Stadium • Houston, TX	6–5	**Ruiz, Aaliyah (3–4)**	LEE, Megan (3–1)	None	ESPN+		4–8	
Feb 26	vs Houston Baptist*		Cougar Softball Stadium • Houston, TX	8–11	Janes, Katy (2–2)	**Mixon, Shelby (0–3)**	None			4–9	
Feb 27	vs Northern Colorado*		Cougar Softball Stadium • Houston, TX	5–8 (8 inn)	DiNAPOLI, Isabelle (1–3)	**Ruiz, Aaliyah (3–5)**	None			4–10	
Feb 27	vs Houston Baptist*		Cougar Softbal Stadium • Houston, TX	9–11	Janes, Katy (3–2)	**Ruiz, Aaliyah (3–6)**	None			4–11	

March (2–9)
Date	Opponent	Rank	Site/Stadium	Score	Win	Loss	Save	TV	Attendance	Overall Record	WAC Record
Mar 4	at Sam Houston		Bearkat Softball Complex • Huntsville, TX	0–10	Dunn, Regan (2–2)	**Ruiz, Aaliyah (3–6)**	None		150	4–12	0–1
Mar 4	at Sam Houston		Bearkat Softball Complex • Huntsville, TX	2–7	Vento, Mika (2–5)	**Linton, Haila (1–4)**	None		150	4–13	0–2
Mar 5	at Sam Houston		Bearkat Softball Complex • Huntsville, TX	6–7	Vento, Mika (3–5)	**Ruiz, Aaliyah (3–7**)	None			4–14	0–3
Mar 11	Abilene Christian		Lamar Softball Complex • Beaumont, TX	2–3	Holman, Sidney (5–7	**Ruiz, Aaliyah (3–8)**	None		200	4–15	0–4
Mar 11	Abilene Christian		Lamar Softball Complex • Beaumont, TX	3–4	White, Riley (6–5)	**Mixon, Shelby (0–4)**	Schiek, Lauren (1)		550	4–16	0–5
Mar 12	Abilene Christian		Lamar Softball Complex • Beaumont, TX	6–9	Holman, Sidney (5–7)	**Linton, Haila (1–5**	Schiek, Lauren (1)		530	4–17	0–6
Mar 18	at Stephen F. Austin		SFA Softball Field • Nacogdoches, TX	3–6	Kassidy Wilbur (8–8)	Pizarro, Kelsey (0–1)	None		237	4–18	0–7
Mar 18	at Stephen F. Austin		SFA Softball Field • Nacogdoches, TX	4–3	**Ruiz, Aaliyah (4–8)**	Kassidy Wilbur (8–9)	None		117	5–18	1–7
Mar 19	at Stephen F. Austin		SFA Softball Field • Nacogdoches, TX	0–4	Kassidy Wilbur (9–9)	**Ruiz, Aaliyah (4–9)**	None		120	5–19	1–8
Mar 22	at Texas*	#24	Red and Charline McCombs Field • Austin, TX	0–8	Dolcini, Hailey (8–3)	**Ruiz, Aaliyah (4–10)**	None		766	5–20	
Mar 29	Houston Baptist*		Lamar Softball Complex • Beaumont, TX	9–1	**Ruiz, Aaliyah (5–10)**	Venker, S (1–6)		WAC Digital Network		6–20	

April (4–13)
Date	Opponent	Rank	Site/Stadium	Score	Win	Loss	Save	TV	Attendance	Overall Record	WAC Record
Apr 1	Tarleton State		Lamar Softball Complex • Beaumont, TX	1–8	Bridges, Tristan (38–0)	**Linton, Haila (1–6)**	None	WAC Digital Network		6–21	1–9
Apr 1	Tarleton State		Lamar Softball Complex • Beaumont, TX	3–2 (8 inn)	**Ruiz, Aaliyah (6–10)**	Chism, Reagan (3–3)	None	WAC Digital Network	400	7–21	2–9
Apr 1	Tarleton State		Lamar Softball Complex • Beaumont, TX	5–3	**Ruiz, Aaliyah (7–10)**	Bridges, Tristan (8–7)	None		200	8–21	3–9
Apr 6	at Baylor*		Getterman Stadium • Waco, TX	1–8	Dariana Orme (7–10)	**Linton, Haila (0–0)**	None	ESPN+		8–22	
Apr 8	at Abilene Christian		Poly Wells Field • Abilene, TX	3–6	Holman, Sidney (11–10)	**Ruiz, Aaliyah (7–11)**	None		104	8–23	3–10
Apr 8	at Abilene Christian		Poly Wells Field • Abilene, TX	4–16	White, Riley (7–7)	**Ruiz, Aaliyah (7–12)**	None	ESPN+	95	8–24	3–11
Apr 9	at Abilene Christian		Poly Wells Field • Abilene, TX	6–3	**Linton, Haila (2–7)**	Holman, Sidney (11–11)	None	ESPN+	95	9–24	4–11
Apr 15	Stephen F. Austin		Lamar Softball Complex • Beaumont, TX	0–11	K. Wilbur (16–10)	**Mixon, Shelby (0–5)**	None	WAC Digital Network		9–25	4–12
Apr 15	Stephen F. Austin		Lamar Softball Complex • Beaumont, TX	0–5	K. Wilbur (17–10)	**Pizarro, Kelsey (0–2)**	None	WAC Digital Network	375	9–26	4–13
Apr 16	Stephen F. Austin		Lamar Softball Complex • Beaumont, TX	1–10	S. Hannabas (4–3)	**Pizarro, Kelsey (0–3)**	None	WAC Digital Network	475	9–27	4–14
Apr 22	McNeese State*		Lamar Softball Complex • Beaumont, TX	2–6	Tate, Whitney (9–7)	**Ruiz, Aaliyah (7–13)**	Sanders, Shaelyn (2)	WAC Digital Network	504	9–28	
Apr 23	McNeese State*		Joe Miller Field at Cowgirl Diamond • Lake Charles, LA	1–8	Vallejo, Ashley (11–7)	**Ruiz, Aaliyah (7–14)**	None	ESPN+		9–29	
Apr 23	McNeese State*		Joe Miller Field at Cowgirl Diamond • Lake Charles, LA	3–7	Tate, Whitney (10–7)	**Ruiz, Aaliyah (7–15)**	None			9–30	
Apr. 27	at Texas A&M*		Davis Diamond • College Station, TX	2–3	KENNEDY (9–7)	**Ruiz, Aaliyah (7–16)**	HERZOG (2)	SECN	1,076	9–31	
Apr. 29	at Tarleton State		Tarleton Softball Complex • Stephenville, TX	11–9	**Ruiz, Aaliyah (8–16)**	Chism, Reagan (7–4)	None	WAC Digital Network	341	11–31	5–14
Apr. 29	at Tarleton State		Tarleton Softball Complex • Stephenville, TX	3–4	Wernet, Julia (4–2)	**Pizarro, Kelsey (0–4)**	None	WAC Digital Network	321	11–32	5–15
Apr. 30	at Tarleton State		Tarleton Softball Complex • Stephenville, TX	1–8	Bridges, T (11–10)	**Ruiz, Aaliyah (8–17)**	None	WAC Digital Network	484	11–33	5–16

May (1–4)
Date	Opponent	Rank	Site/Stadium	Score	Win	Loss	Save	TV	Attendance	Overall Record	WAC Record
May 3	Texas Southern*		Lamar Softball Complex • Beaumont, TX	1–0	**Linton, Haila (3–7)**	GENDORF, Jaz (11–8)	None	WAC Digital Network		11–33	
May 3	Texas Southern*		Lamar Softball Complex • Beaumont, TX	1–2	GENDORF, Jaz (12–8)	**Ruiz, Aaliyah (8–18)**	BELL, Lailah (1)	WAC Digital Network	228	11–34	
May 6	Sam Houston		Lamar Softball Complex • Beaumont, TX	1–2	Dunn, R. (4–10)	**Linton, Haila (3–8)**	Vento, M. (3)	WAC Digital Network	228	11–35	5–17
May 6	Sam Houston		Lamar Softball Complex • Beaumont, TX	0–8	Vento, M. (5–18	**Ruiz, Aaliyah (8–19)**		WAC Digital Network	416	11–36	5–18
May 7	Sam Houston		Lamar Softball Complex • Beaumont, TX	4–6	Vento, M. (6–17)	**Linton, Haila (3–9)**	None	WAC Digital Network	482	11–37	5–19

WAC Tournament (0–1)
Date	Opponent	(Seed)/Rank	Site/stadium	Score	Win	Loss	Save	TV	Attendance	Overall record	Tournament record
May 11	vs. Utah Valley	(5)	Bearkat Softball Complex • Huntsville, TX	5–9	Zuniga, Katie (11–10)	**Ruiz, Aaliyah (8–20)**	None	ESPN+		11–38	0–1

Schedule source:

*Rankings are based on the team's current ranking in the NFCA/USA Softball poll.

=== 2021 Lamar Lady Cardinals softball team ===
2021 Lamar Lady Cardinals softball
- Conference: Southland Conference
- Record: 8–43 (4–23 Southland)
- Head coach: Amy Hooks (3rd season)
- Assistant coach: Tara McKenney
- Home stadium: Lamar Softball Complex

2021 Southland Conference softball standings
	Conf.				Overall
Team	W		L	PCT	W		L	PCT
Stephen F. Austin ‍†‍‍	25	–	2	.926	35	–	12	.745
Central Arkansas ‍‍‍	21	–	6	.778	37	–	19	.661
McNeese State ‍‍‡‍^{y}	18	–	9	.667	35	–	26	.574
Northwestern State ‍‍‍	16	–	11	.593	24	–	22	.522
Southeastern Louisiana ‍‍‍	14	–	10	.583	28	–	23	.549
Houston Baptist ‍‍‍	15	–	12	.556	22	–	17	.564
Sam Houston State ‍‍‍	14	–	13	.519	19	–	31	.380
Abilene Christian ‍‍‍	10	–	17	.370	14	–	33	.298
Incarnate Word ‍‍‍	9	–	18	.333	16	–	27	.372
Texas A&M–Corpus Christi ‍‍‍	8	–	16	.333	18	–	30	.375
Nicholls ‍‍‍	5	–	22	.185	12	–	28	.300
Lamar ‍‍‍	4	–	23	.148	8	–	43	.157
† – Conference champion ‡ – Tournament champion y – Invited to the NCAA tournament As of May 22, 2021; Rankings from NFCA

The 2021 Lamar Lady Cardinals softball team represented Lamar University during the 2021 NCAA Division I softball season. The Lady Cardinals played their home games at Lamar Softball Complex and were led by third-year head coach Amy Hooks. They were members of the Southland Conference. Home game attendance for the 2021 season was limited to 119 per game due to COVID19 precautions.

==== Preseason ====
===== Southland Conference Coaches Poll =====
The Southland Conference Coaches Poll was released on February 5, 2021. Lamar was picked to finish eighth in the Southland Conference with 86 votes.

**Coaches poll**
Predicted finish	Team	Votes (1st place)
1	Stephen F. Austin	235 (17)
2	McNeese State	217 (4)
3	Southeastern Louisiana	183
4	Sam Houston State	172 (1)
5	Central Arkansas	162 (1)
6	Northwestern State	156 (1)
7	Nicholls	131
**8**	**Lamar**	**86**
9	Abilene Christian	82
10	Houston Baptist	81
11	Texas A&M–Corpus Christi	47
12	Incarnate Word	32

===== Preseason All-Southland team =====
No player from Lamar was chosen to the All-Southland Team

===== National Softball Signing Day =====
Player	Position	Hometown	Previous Team
Cassie Blevins	Infielder	Spring Branch, Texas	Smithson Valley HS
Haila Linton	Pitcher	Rio Vista, Texas	Rio Vista HS
Piper Hankins	Outfielder	Euless, Texas	Trinity HS
Sydney Norton	Infielder	Schertz, Texas	Samuel Clemens HS
Kalyn Xayaseng	Infielder	Kirbyville, Texas	Kirbyville HS
Maya Mongelli	Infielder	Wolfforth, Texas	Frenship HS

==== Roster ====
2021 Lamar Lady Cardinals roster
**Pitchers**: 19 Janelle Marwitz – Freshman; 25 Shelby Mixon – Senior; 33 Hannah Williams – Freshman; 50 Aaliyah Ruiz – Junior; 88 Breanna Reyna – Freshman; **Outfielders**: 1 Savana Mata – Junior; 5 Brooke Smith – Junior; 6 Audry Fleming – Freshman; 8 Aleka Xayaseng – Junior; **Catchers**: 3 Hannah Carpenter – Senior; 23 Alicia Lopez – Sophomore; 49 Felixia Hinojosa – Sophomore	**Infielders**: 4 Hannah Kinkade – Sophomore; 10 Hayley Freudenberg – Freshman; 17 Sydnee Adams – Freshman; 20 Victoria Garivey – Redshirt Junior; 21 Taylor Murphy – Junior; 22 Jaylyn Davis – Freshman; 27 Kaylee Ancelot – Junior; **Utility**: 00 Olivia Taylor – Sophomore; 2 Nicolette Ramirez – Sophomore; 7 Reagan Jones – Freshman; 15 Alaina Cortez – Freshman

==== Coaching staff ====
2021 Lamar Lady Cardinals coaching staff
- Amy Hooks – Head Coach – 3rd year
- Tara McKenney – Assistant Head Coach – 3rd year
- Robert Armentrout – Volunteer Assistant Coach
- Elise LeBeouf – Graduate Assistant Coach – 2nd year

==== Schedule and results ====
Legend
	Lamar win
	Lamar loss
	Postponement/Cancellation
**Bold**	Lamar team member

2021 Lamar Lady Cardinals Softball Game Log
Regular season (5–37)

February (2–13)
Date	Opponent	Rank	Site/stadium	Score	Win	Loss	Save	TV	Attendance	Overall record	SLC Record
Feb 12	at Houston		Cougar Softball Complex • Houston, TX	**L** 1–14 (5 inns)	Hertenberger (1–0)	**Reyna** (0–1)	None		39	0–1	
Feb 12	at Houston		Cougar Softball Complex • Houston, TX	**W** 6–4	**Ruiz** (1–0)	Hulon (0–1)	**Mixon** (1)		39	1–1	
Feb 13	UTSA		Lamar Softball Complex • Beaumont, TX	**L** 1–7	Hernandez (1–0)	**Reyna** (0–2)	None		86	1–2	
Feb 13	UTSA		Lamar Softball Complex • Beaumont, TX	**L** 2–11 (5 inns)	Estell (1–0)	**Ruiz** (0–2)	None		56	1–3	
Feb 14	Texas Southern		Lamar Softball Complex • Beaumont, TX	Game Cancelled due to threat of freezing rain/sleet/snow in Beaumont							
Feb 14	Texas Southern		Lamar Softball Complex • Beamont, TX	Game Cancelled due to threat of freezing rain/sleet/snow in Beaumont							
Feb 16	No. 9 Louisiana		Lamar Softball Complex • Beamont, TX	Game Cancelled due to threat of freezing rain/sleet/snow in Beaumont							
Feb 16	No. 9 Louisiana		Lamar Softball Complex • Beaumont, TX	Game Cancelled due to threat of freezing rain/sleet/snow in Beaumont							
Scrap Yard Blizzard Challenge
Feb 20	vs. Wichita State		Scrap Yard Sports Complex • Conroe, TX	**L** 0–19 (5 inns)	McDonald (1–0)	**Mixon** (0–1)	None			1–4	
Feb 20	vs. North Texas		Scrap Yard Sports Complex • Conroe, TX	**L** 1–9 (5 inns)	Trautwein (2–0)	**Williams** (0–1)	None			1–5	
Feb 21	vs. North Texas		Scrap Yard Sports Complex • Conroe, TX	**L** 0–8 (5 inns)	Wall (1–2)	**Reyna** (0–3)	None			1–6	
Feb 21	vs. Tarleton State		Scrap Yard Sports Complex • Conroe, TX	**W** 4–1	**Mixon** (1–1)	Bridges (0–2)	**Williams** (1)			2–6	
Feb 22	No. 11 Oklahoma State		Lamar Softball Complex • Beaumont, TX	**L** 0–8	Boyd (1–0)	**Reyna** (0–4)	Simunek (1)		119	2–7	
Feb 22	No. 11 Oklahoma State		Lamar Softball Complex • Beaumont, TX	**L** 0–11 (5 inns)	Sprang (1–0)	**Mixon** (1–2)	None		119	2–8	
Lone Star State Invitational
Feb 26	at No. 7 Texas		Red and Charline McCombs Field • Austin, TX	**L** 0–10 (5 inns)	Adams (1–0)	**Reyna** (0–5)	None	LHN		2–9	
Feb 26	vs. Sam Houston State		Red and Charline McCombs Field • Austin, TX	**L** 6–12	Dunn (1–0)	**Mixon** (1–3)	None	LHN		2–10	
Feb 27	vs. UConn		Getterman Stadium • Waco, TX	**L** 0–7	Dunn (1–0)	**Mixon** (1–3)	None	FloSoftball	100	2–11	
Feb 27	at No. 23 Baylor		Getterman Stadium • Waco, TX	**L** 0–10 (5 inns)	Judisch (1–0)	**Williams** (0–2)	None		150	2–12	
Feb 28	at Texas State		Bobcat Softball Stadium • San Marcos, TX	**L** 1–8	King (2–0)	**Marwitz** (0–1)	None		234	2–13	

March (2–14)
Date	Opponent	Rank	Site/stadium	Score	Win	Loss	Save	TV	Attendance	Overall record	SLC Record
Reveille Classic
Mar 5	vs. No. 25 Tennessee		Davis Diamond • College Station, TX	**L** 0–8 (5 inns)	McCachren (4–0)	**Ruiz** (1–3)	None		45	2–14	
Mar 5	at Texas A&M		Davis Diamond • College Station, TX	**L** 0–8 (5 inns)	Uribe (3–0)	**Marwitz** (0–2)	None		390	2–15	
Mar 6	vs. Campbell		Davis Diamond • College Station, TX	**L** 1–9	Barefoot (2–0)	**Ruiz** (1–4)	None		41	2–16	
Mar 6	vs. No. 25 Tennessee		Davis Diamond • College Station, TX	**L** 0–8 (5 inns)	Turner (4–0)	**Williams** (0–3)	None		49	2–17	
Mar 7	at Texas A&M		Davis Diamond • College Station, TX	**L** 3–13 (5 inns)	Poynter (3–0)	**Ruiz** (1–5)	None		511	2–18	
Mar 12	at Southeastern Louisiana		North Oak Park • Hammond, LA	**L** 2–6	Zumo (7–2)	**Ruiz** (1–6)	DuBois (2)		243	2–19	0–1
Mar 12	at Southeastern Louisiana		North Oak Park • Hammond, LA	**L** 1–8	Comeaux (4–4)	**Mixon** (1–4)	None		243	2–20	0–2
Mar 13	at Southeastern Louisiana		North Oak Park • Hammond, LA	**L** 3–7	Comeaux (4–5)	**Williams** (0–4)	None		245	2–21	0–3
Mar 16	Texas Southern		Lamar Softball Complex • Beaumont, TX	Game Postponed							
Mar 16	Texas Southern		Lamar Softball Complex • Beaumont, TX	Game Postponed							
Mar 19	Texas A&M–Corpus Christi		Lamar Softball Complex • Beaumont, TX	**L** 0–6	Lara (7–2)	**Mixon** (1–5)	None		119	2–22	0–4
Mar 19	Texas A&M–Corpus Christi		Lamar Softball Complex • Beaumont, TX	**L** 0–11 (5 inns)	Lombrana (3–6)	**Reyna** (0–6)	None		119	2–23	0–5
Mar 20	Texas A&M–Corpus Christi		Lamar Softball Complex • Beaumont, TX	**L** 0–6	Lara (8–2)	**Reyna** (0–7)	None		119	2–24	0–6
Mar 26	at Stephen F. Austin		SFA Softball Field • Nacogdoches, TX	**L** 1–10 (5 inns)	Wilbur (12–3)	**Mixon** (1–6)	None		150	2–25	0–7
Mar 26	at Stephen F. Austin		SFA Softball Field • Nacogdoches, TX	**L** 2–14 (5 inns)	Chism (3–0)	**Reyna** (0–8)	None		113	2–26	0–8
Mar 27	at Stephen F. Austin		SFA Softball Field • Nacogdoches, TX	**L** 1–9 (5 inns)	Wilbur (13–3)	**Mixon** (1–7)	None		85	2–27	0–9
Mar 30	Texas Southern		Lamar Softball Complex • Beaumont, TX	**W** 7–6	**Williams** (1–4)	Hernandez (0–1)	None		56	3–27	
Mar 30	Texas Southern		Lamar Softball Complex • Beaumont, TX	**W** 7–1	**Reyna** (1–8)	Bell (1–1)	None		65	4–27	

April (3–13)
Date	Opponent	Rank	Site/stadium	Score	Win	Loss	Save	TV	Attendance	Overall record	SLC Record
Apr 2	at McNeese State		Joe Miller Field at Cowgirl Diamond • Lake Charles, LA	**L** 2–7	Edwards (5–1)	**Mixon** (1–8)	None		257	4–28	0–10
Apr 3	at McNeese State		Joe Miller Field at Cowgirl Diamond • Lake Charles, LA	**L** 0–8 (5 inns)	Tate (6–7)	**Reyna** (1–9)	None			4–29	0–11
Apr 3	at McNeese State		Joe Miller Field at Cowgirl Diamond • Lake Charles, LA	**L** 1–2	Vallejo (2–5)	**Mixon** (1–9)	Flores (2)		257	4–30	0–12
Apr 5	No. 16 Louisiana		Lamar Softball Complex • Beaumont, TX	**L** 0–18 (5 inns)	Lamb (13–2)	**Reyna** (1–10)	None		119	4–31	
Apr 5	No. 16 Louisiana		Lamar Softball Complex • Beaumont, TX	**L** 0–10 (5 inns)	Dixon (4–0)	**Mixon** (1–10)	None		119	4–32	
Apr 9	Northwestern State		Lamar Softball Complex • Beaumont, TX	**W** 3–1	**Mixon** (2–10)	Howell (5–5)	None		119	5–32	1–12
Apr 9	Northwestern State		Lamar Softball Complex • Beaumont, TX	**L** 2–15	Delafield (6–2)	**Reyna** (1–11)	None		119	5–33	1–13
Apr 10	Northwestern State		Lamar Softball Complex • Beaumont, TX	**L** 4–5	Delafield (7–2)	**Mixon** (2–11)	Rhoden (2)		119	5–34	1–14
Apr 17	Incarnate Word		Lamar Softball Complex • Beaumont, TX	**L** 1–9 (6 inns)	Gunther (5–7)	**Mixon** (2–12)	None		119	5–35	1–15
Apr 18	Incarnate Word		Lamar Softball Complex • Beaumont, TX	**L** 5–7	Trapp (4–5)	**Ruiz** (1–7)	Floyd (1)		119	5–36	1–16
Apr 18	Incarnate Word		Lamar Softball Complex • Beaumont, TX	**L** 1–5	Gunther (6–7)	**Mixon** (2–13)	None		119	5–37	1–17
Apr 24	at Houston Baptist		Husky Field • Houston, TX	**L** 2–9	Patak (6–8)	**Mixon** (2–14)	None		57	5–38	1–18
Apr 24	at Houston Baptist		Husky Field • Houston, TX	**L** 1–2 (8 inns)	Swanson (8–0)	**Ruiz** (0–3)	None		150	5–39	1–19
Apr 25	at Houston Baptist		Husky Field • Houston, TX	**L** 0–7	Venker (3–1)	**Mixon** (2–15)	None		115	5–40	1–20
Apr 30	Nicholls		Lamar Softball Complex • Beaumont, TX	**W** 4–3	**Ruiz** (2–8)	LaBure (3–5)	None		119	6–40	2–20
Apr 30	Nicholls		Lamar Softball Complex • Beaumont, TX	**W** 3–1	**Mixon** (3–15)	Westbrook (3–9)	None		119	7–40	3–20

May (1–3)
Date	Opponent	Rank	Site/stadium	Score	Win	Loss	Save	TV	Attendance	Overall record	SLC Record
May 1	Nicholls		Lamar Softball Complex • Beaumont, TX	**W** 9–4	**Ruiz** (3–8)	Turner (0–2)	None		119	8–40	4–20
May 7	at Central Arkansas		Farris Field • Conway, AR	**L** 0–7	Johnson (11–7)	**Ruiz** (3–9)	None		219	8–41	4–21
May 7	at Central Arkansas		Farris Field • Conway, AR	**L** 1–12 (5 inns)	Beaver (18–6)	**Mixon** (3–16)	None		218	8–42	4–22
May 8	at Central Arkansas		Farris Field • Conway, AR	**L** 2–11 (6 inns)	Engelkes (1–0)	**Ruiz** (3–10)	None		218	8–43	4–23

Schedule source:

*Rankings are based on the team's current ranking in the NFCA/USA Softball poll.

=== 2020 Lamar Lady Cardinals softball team ===
2020 Lamar Lady Cardinals softball
- Conference: Southland Conference
- Record: 8–12 (0–3 SLC)
- Head coach: Amy Hooks (2nd season)
- Assistant coach: Tara McKenney (2nd season)
- Home stadium: Lamar Softball Complex

2020 Southland Conference softball standings
	Conf.				Overall
Team	W		L	PCT	W		L	PCT
Stephen F. Austin ‍‍‍	3	–	0	1.000	19	–	4	.826
McNeese State ‍‍‍	3	–	0	1.000	19	–	7	.731
Northwestern State ‍‍‍	3	–	0	1.000	15	–	7	.682
Central Arkansas ‍‍‍	3	–	0	1.000	17	–	9	.654
Southeastern Louisiana ‍‍‍	2	–	1	.667	15	–	8	.652
Nicholls ‍‍‍	2	–	1	.667	12	–	14	.462
Houston Baptist ‍‍‍	1	–	2	.333	12	–	10	.545
Texas A&M–Corpus Christi ‍‍‍	1	–	2	.333	6	–	16	.273
Lamar ‍‍‍	0	–	3	.000	9	–	12	.429
Sam Houston State ‍‍‍	0	–	3	.000	9	–	17	.346
Incarnate Word ‍‍‍	0	–	3	.000	8	–	16	.333
Abilene Christian ‍‍‍	0	–	3	.000	7	–	17	.292
† – Conference champion ‡ – Tournament champion y – Invited to the NCAA tournament As of March 13, 2020; Rankings from NFCA

The 2020 Lamar Lady Cardinals softball team represented Lamar University in the 2020 NCAA Division I softball season. The Lady Cardinals played their home games at Lamar Softball Complex and are members of the Southland Conference. The team was coached by Amy Hooks in her second season at Lamar. On March 12, the Southland Conference announced a suspension of Spring sports through March 30 due to the COVID-19 pandemic. The conference announced that all remaining Spring 2020 sports contests were cancelled on March 14. The Lady Cardinals played 20 games in the shortened season with an overall record of 8–12, and a 0–3 record in conference play.

==== Previous season ====
In 2019, the Lady Cardinals finished the season 7th in the Southland with a record of 23–34, 14–13 in conference play. They lost to Northwestern State in the first round of the 2019 Southland Conference softball tournament.

==== Preseason ====
===== Southland Conference Coaches and Sports Information Directors Poll =====
The Southland Conference Coaches and Sports Information Directors Poll was released on January 30, 2020. Lamar was picked to finish eighth in the Southland Conference with 110 votes.

**Coaches and Sports Information Directors poll**
Predicted finish	Team	Votes (1st place)
**1**	Stephen F. Austin	217 (11)
2	Sam Houston State	210 (10)
3	McNeese	202 (1)
4	Nicholls	186 (2)
5	Southeastern Louisiana	177
6	Northwestern State	152
7	Central Arkansas	122
8	**Lamar**	**110**
9	Abilene Christian	61
10	Houston Baptist	56
11	Texas A&M–Corpus Christi	52
12	Incarnate Word	39

===== Preseason All-Southland Conference team =====
The preseason all-conference team is based on votes by the conference head coaches. Players who were named to the previous season's first and second teams are automatically named to the preseason team for their respective positions.

- Kaylyn Shepherd* (UCA, SR, 1st Base)
- Cayla Jones* (NWSU, JR, 2nd Base)
- Cylla Hill* (UCA, SR, 3rd Base)
- Tiffany Thompson* (SHSU, SR, Shortstop)
- Ella Manzer* (SLU, JR, Catcher)
- **Jade Lewis* (LU, SR, Designated Player/Pitcher)**
- Megan McDonald* (SHSU, SR, Outfield)
- Madisen Blackford* (SLU, JR, Outfield)
- Kayla Crutchmer* (UCA, SR, Outfield)
- Kassidy Wilbur* (SFA, SO, Pitcher)
- Alley McDonald* (SLU, SR, Pitcher)
- Alexsandra Flores* (MSU, SR, Pitcher)
- E.C. Delafield* (NWSU, JR, Utility)
- 2019 All-Conference Designation

==== Roster ====
**2020 Lamar Lady Cardinals roster**
**Pitchers**: 15 Erin Kyle – Senior; 25 Shelby Mixon – Junior; 30 Mackenzie Savage – Sophomore; 50 Aaliyah Ruiz – Sophomore; 81 Jade Lewis – Senior; **Catchers**: 3 Hannah Carpenter – Junior; 23 Alicia Lopez – Freshman; 49 Felixia Hinojosa – Freshman; **Utilities**: 00 Olivia Taylor – Freshman; 2 Nicolette Ramirez – Freshman	**Infielders**: 4 Hannah KinKade – Freshman; 6 Elizabeth Castillo – Senior; 12 Kristin Meyer – Sophomore; 13 Mackenzie Brown – Sophomore; 20 Victoria Garivey – Sophomore; 21 Taylor Murphy – Sophomore; **Outfielders**: 1 Savana Mata – Sophomore; 5 Shaina Amir – Sophomore; 9 Mackenzie Futrell – Senior; 19 Shannon Klaus – Senior

==== Coaches ====
**2020 Lamar Cardinals softball coaching staff**
- Amy Hooks – Head Coach – 2nd year
- Tara McKenney – Assistant Coach – 2nd year
- Elise Lebeouf – Graduate Assistant Coach
- Savana Guidry – Student assistant coach

==== Schedule and results ====
2020 Lamar Lady Cardinals baseball game log
Legend: = Win = Loss = Cancelled Bold = Lamar team member
Regular Season (8–12)

February (8–8)
Date	Opponent	Site/stadium	Score	Win	Loss	Save	Attendance	Overall record	SLC Record
Texas Classic
Feb 7	vs. Wichita State*	Red and Charline McCombs Field • Austin, TX	**L** 2–19 (5 inn.)	Caitlan Bingham (1–0)	**Erin Kyle (0–1)**	None		0–1	
Feb 7	at #6 Texas*	Red and Charline McCombs Field • Austin, TX	**L** 0–12 (5 inn.)	Ariana Williams (1–0)	**Aaliyah Ruiz (0–1)**	None	895	0–2	
Feb 8	vs Colorado State*	Red and Charline McCombs Field • Austin, TX	**L** 1–4	Julia Cabral (1–0)	**Jade Lewis (0–1)**	None		0–3	
Feb 8	vs Maryland*	Red and Charline McCombs Field • Austin, TX	**W** 7–6	**Shelby Mixon (1–0)**	T. Schlotterbeck (0–2)	None		1–3	
Feb 8	at #13 Louisiana*	Yvette Girouard Field at Lamson Park • Lafayette, LA	**L** 0–8 (6 inn.)	Summer Ellyson (3–0)	**Erin Kyle (0–2)**	None	1,875	1–4	
Texas A&M Invitational
Feb 14	vs Binghamton*	Davis Diamond • College Station, TX	**W** 1–0	**Aaliyah Ruiz (1–1)**	Rayn Gibson (0–1)	none	108	2–4	
Feb 14	at Texas A&M*	Davis Diamond • College Station, TX	**L** 0–8 (6 inn.)	Makinzy Hertzog (3–0)	**Shelby Mixon (1–1)**	None	1,068	2–5	
Feb 15	vs St. Johns*	Davis Diamond • College Station, TX	**W** 10–2 (5 inn.)	**Aaliyah Ruiz (2–1)**	Faeita (0–2)	None	230	3–5	
Feb 15	at Texas A&M*	Davis Diamond • College Station, TX	**L** 4–7	Hertzog (3–0)	**Erin Kyle (0–3)**	None	1,275	3–6	
Feb 16	vs Binghamton*	Davis Diamond • College Station, TX	**W** 4–1	**Aaliyah Ruiz (3–1)**	Bienkowski (0–2)	None	209	4–6	
Cardinal Classic
Feb 21	Northern Colorado*	Lamar Softball Complex • Beaumont, TX	**W** 5–2	**Aaliyah Ruiz (4–1)**	M. Thurston (1–5)	None	158	5–6	
Feb 21	St. Johns*	Lamar Softball Complex • Beaumont, TX	**W** 5–4	**Erin Kyle (1–3)**	Kayla Kmett (0–3)	None	228	6–6	
Feb 22	Northern Colorado*	Lamar Softball Complex • Beaumont, TX	**W** 4–1	**Shelby Mixon (2–1)**	E. Caviness (0–1)	None	128	7–6	
Feb 22	St. Johns*	Lamar Softball Complex • Beaumont, TX	**W** 6–1	**Aaliyah Ruiz (5–1)**	Mia Faieta (0–3)	None	325	8–6	
Feb 29 (DH)	Texas Southern*	Lamar Softball Complex • Beaumont, TX	**L** 1–6	Jazmine Gendorf (2–2)	**Aaliyah Ruiz (5–2)**	None	320	8–7	
Feb 29	Texas Southern*	Lamar Softball Complex • Beaumont, TX	**L** 3–5	Chelsea Baxter (2–2)	**Shelby Mixon (2–2)**	None	386	8–8	

March (0–4)
Date	Opponent	Site/stadium	Score	Win	Loss	Save	Attendance	Overall record	SLC Record
Mar 4	Louisiana Tech*	Lamar Softball Complex • Beaumont, TX	**L** 4–5	Audrey Pickett (2–6)	**Erin Kyle (1–4)**	None	226	8–9	
Mar 6 (DH)	Stephen F. Austin	Lamar Softball Complex • Beaumont, TX	**L** 0–4	Ashley Kriesel (10–1)	**Aaliyah Ruiz (6–3)**	None	328	8–10	0–1
Mar 6 (DH)	Stephen F. Austin	Lamar Softball Complex • Beaumont, TX	**L** 1–10	Kassidy Wilbur (6–2)	**Mackenzie Savage (0–1)**	None	358	8–11	0–2
Mar 7	Stephen F. Austin	Lamar Softball Complex • Beaumont, TX	**L** 0–10 (6 inn.)	Ashley Kriesel (11–1)	**Aaliyah Ruiz (6–4)**	None	328	8–12	0–3
Mar 10	UTSA*	Lamar Softball Complex • Beaumont, TX	–					–	
Mar 13 (DH)	at Northwestern State	Lady Demon Diamond • Natchitoches, LA	–					–	–
Mar 13	at Northwestern State	Lady Demon Diamond • Natchitoches, LA	–					–	–
Mar 14	at Northwestern State	Lady Demon Diamond • Natchitoches, LA	–					–	–
Mar 20 (DH)	at Texas A&M–Corpus Christi	Chapman Field • Corpus Christi, TX	–					–	–
Mar 20 (DH)	at Texas A&M–Corpus Christi	Chapman Field • Corpus Christi, TX	–					–	–
Mar 21	at Texas A&M–Corpus Christi	Chapman Field • Corpus Christi, TX	–					–	–
Mar 26	Texas State*	Lamar Softball Complex • Beaumont, TX	–					–	
Mar 27 (DH)	Sam Houston State	Lamar Softball Complex • Beaumont, TX	–					–	–
Mar 27 (DH)	Sam Houston State	Lamar Softball Complex • Beaumont, TX	–					–	–
Mar 28	Sam Houston State	Lamar Softball Complex • Beaumont, TX	–					–	–

April (0–0)
Date	Opponent	Site/stadium	Score	Win	Loss	Save	Attendance	Overall record	SLC Record
Apr 3 (DH)	at Abilene Christian	Poly Wells Field • Abilene, TX	–					–	–
Apr 3 (DH)	at Abilene Christian	Poly Wells Field • Abilene, TX	–					–	–
Apr 4	at Abilene Christian	Poly Wells Field • Abilene, TX	–					–	–
Apr 7	at LSU*	Tiger Park • Baton Rouge, LA	–					–	
Apr 10 (DH)	Southeastern Louisiana	Lamar Softball Complex • Beaumont, TX	–					–	–
Apr 10 (DH)	Southeastern Louisiana	Lamar Softball Complex • Beaumont, TX	–					–	–
Apr 11	Southeastern Louisiana	Lamar Softball Complex • Beaumont, TX	–					–	–
Apr 15	at Houston Baptist*	Husky Field • Houston, TX	–					–	
Apr 17 (DH)	McNeese State	Lamar Softball Complex • Beaumont, TX	–					–	–
Apr 17 (DH)	McNeese State	Lamar Softball Complex • Beaumont, TX	–					–	–
Apr 18	McNeese State	Lamar Softball Complex • Beaumont, TX	–					–	–
Apr 24 (DH)	at Central Arkansas	Farris Field • Conway, AR	–					–	–
Apr 24 (DH)	at Central Arkansas	Farris Field • Conway, AR	–					–	–
Apr 25	at Central Arkansas	Farris Field • Conway, AR	–					–	–
Apr 29	Houston*	Lamar Softball Complex • Beaumont, TX	–					–	

May (0–0)
Date	Opponent	Site/stadium	Score	Win	Loss	Save	Attendance	Overall record	SLC Record
May 1	at Nicholls	Swanner Field at Geo Surfaces Park • Thibodaux, LA	–					–	–
May 2 (DH)	at Nicholls	Swanner Field at Geo Surfaces Park • Thibodaux, LA	–					–	–
May 2 (DH)	at Nicholls	Swanner Field at Geo Surfaces Park • Thibodaux, LA	–					–	–

=== 2019 Lamar Lady Cardinals softball team ===
2019 Lamar Lady Cardinals softball
- Conference: Southland Conference
- Record: 23–34 (14–13 SLC)
- Head coach: Amy Hooks (1st season)
- Assistant coaches: Erin Dickson; Rudi Cantu–Torres; Tara McKinney – Vol. Asst
- Home stadium: Lamar Softball Complex

2019 Southland Conference softball standings
	Conf.				Overall
Team	W		L	PCT	W		L	PCT
Sam Houston State ‍†‍‡‍^{y}	22	–	5	.815	35	–	23	.603
Nicholls ‍‍‍	21	–	6	.778	34	–	22	.607
McNeese State ‍‍‍	19	–	8	.704	33	–	32	.508
Stephen F. Austin ‍‍‍	18	–	9	.667	36	–	23	.610
Southeastern Louisiana ‍‍‍	17	–	10	.630	34	–	23	.596
Northwestern State ‍‍‍	15	–	12	.556	30	–	27	.526
Lamar ‍‍‍	14	–	13	.519	23	–	34	.404
Central Arkansas ‍‍‍	12	–	15	.444	26	–	28	.481
Houston Baptist ‍‍‍	10	–	17	.370	23	–	23	.500
Abilene Christian ‍‍‍	6	–	21	.222	13	–	31	.295
Incarnate Word ‍‍‍	4	–	22	.154	8	–	40	.167
Texas A&M–Corpus Christi ‍‍‍	3	–	23	.115	8	–	43	.157
† – Conference champion ‡ – Tournament champion y – Invited to the NCAA tournament As of May 19, 2019; Rankings from NFCA

The 2019 Lamar Lady Cardinals softball team represented Lamar University in the 2019 NCAA Division I softball season. The Lady Cardinals played their home games at Lamar Softball Complex and are members of the Southland Conference. The team was coached by Amy Hooks in her first season at Lamar. The Lady Cardinals finished the season 7th in the Southland with a record of 23–34, 14–13 in conference play. They lost to Northwestern State in the single elimination opening round of the 2019 Southland Conference softball tournament.

==== Preseason ====
===== Southland Conference Coaches and Sports Information Directors Poll =====
The Southland Conference Coaches and Sports Information Directors Poll was released on January 30, 2019. Lamar was picked to finish ninth in the Southland Conference with 80 votes.

**Coaches and Sports Information Directors poll**
Predicted finish	Team	Votes (1st place)
1	Nicholls	238 (18)
2	McNeese	224 (6)
3	Central Arkansas	164
4	Southeastern Louisiana	163
5	Stephen F. Austin	158
6	Northwestern State	156
7	Sam Houston State	145
8	Abilene Christian	119
**9**	**Lamar**	**80**
10	Incarnate Word	61
11	Texas A&M–Corpus Christi	40
12	Houston Baptist	36

===== Preseason All-Southland Conference team =====
The preseason all-conference team is based on votes by the conference head coaches. Players who were named to the previous season's first and second teams are automatically named to the preseason team for their respective positions.

First team

- Kaylyn Shepherd* (UCA, JR, 1st Base)
- Cayla Jones* (NWSU, SO, 2nd Base)
- Jewel Lara* (Nicholls SO, 3rd Base)
- Amanda Gianelloni (Nicholls, SR, Shortstop)
- Bailey White* (SHSU, RSO, Catcher)
- Alexandria Saldivar* (MSU, JR, Designated Player/Pitcher)
- Justyce McClain* (MSU, SR, Outfield)
- Kasey Frederick* (Nicholls, SR, Outfield)
- Kelsey Miller* (Nicholls, SO, Outfield)
- Megan Landry* (Nicholls, SR, Pitcher)
- Lindsey McLeod*(SLU, SR, Pitcher)
- Alexsandra Flores* (SHSU, SR, Pitcher)
- Kali Clement* (Nicholls, SR, Utility)
- 2018 All-Conference Designation

Second team

- Sam Dares (Nicholls, JR, 1st Base)
- **Kelly Meeuwsen* (Lamar, SR, 2nd Base)**
- Madison Watson (SLU SO, 3rd Base)
- Tiffany Thompson* (SHSU, JR, Shortstop)
- Heidi Jaquez (HBU, JR, Catcher)
- **Taylor Davis* (Lamar, SR, Designated Player/Pitcher)**
- Donelle Johnson* (ACU, RJR, Outfield)
- Ali McCoy* (SLU, JR, Outfield)
- Morgan Felts* (UCA, SR, Pitcher)
- Alexsandra Flores (MSU, JR, Pitcher)
- Alexis LaBure* (Nicholls, SO, Pitcher)
- Kaitlyn St. Clair* (NWST, JR, Utility)
- 2018 All-Conference Designation

==== Roster ====
**2019 Lamar Lady Cardinals roster**
**Pitchers**: 15 Erin Kyle – Junior; 17 Julia Voluntad – Senior; 30 Mackenzie Savage – Freshman; 50 Aaliyah Ruiz – Freshman; 81 Jade Lewis – Junior; **Catchers**: 10 Lauryn McMahon – Freshman; 25 Bethany Edwards – Freshman; **Utilities**: 13 Kimberly Mattox – Sophomore; 14 Melissa Hernandez – Junior; 16 Maddy Meyers – Senior; 27 Alicia DeLeon – Freshman	**Infielders**: 4 Savanah Guidry – Senior; 5 Shaina Amir – Freshman; 20 Victoria Garivey – Freshman; 21 Taylor Murphy – Freshman; **Outfielders**: 1 Savana Mata – Freshman; 6 Elizabeth Castillo – Junior; 9 Mackenzie Futrell – Junior; 19 Shannon Klaus – Junior

==== Schedule and results ====
Legend
	Lamar win
	Lamar loss
	Postponement/Cancellation
**Bold**	Lamar team member
*	Non-Conference game
†	Make-Up Game

2019 Lamar Lady Cardinals Softball Game Log
Regular season (23–33)

February (8–9)
Date	Opponent	Rank	Site/stadium	Score	Win	Loss	Save	Attendance	Overall record	SLC Record
Scrap Yard Tournament
Feb 8	vs. Wisconsin*		Scrap Yard Sports Complex • Conroe, TX	0–8	Maddie Schwartz (1–0)	**Voluntad, Julia (0–1)**	None		0–1	
Feb 8	vs. Nebraska*		Scrap Yard Sports Complex • Conroe, TX	2–14	Lindsey Walljasper (1–0)	**Lewis, Jade (0–1)**	None		0–2	
Feb 9	vs. Omaha*		Scrap Yard Sports Complex • Conroe, TX	7–5	**Lewis, Jade (1–1)**	Millington, Ryanne (0–2)	None	123	1–2	
Feb 9	vs. Nebraska*		Scrap Yard Sports Complex • Conroe, TX	4–6	Olivia Ferrell (1–1)	**Voluntad, Julia (0–2)**	Regan Mergele (1)		1–3	
Feb 8	vs. Wisconsin*		Scrap Yard Sports Complex • Conroe, TX	0–8	Haley Hestekin (2–1)	**Lewis, Jade (1–2)**	None		1–4	
Feb. 10	vs. Texas Tech*		Scrap Yard Sports Complex • Conroe, TX	1–3	Edmoundson, Erin (4–0)	**Voluntad, Julia (0–3)**	None	165	1–5	
FGCU Invitational
Feb. 15	vs. FIU*		Swanson Stadium • Fort Meyers, FL	0–7	KUGELMANN, M (3–0)	**Voluntad, Julia (0–4)**	None		1–6	
Feb. 15	at Florida Gulf Coast*		Swanson Stadium • Fort Meyers, FL	2–1	**Lewis, Jade (2–2)**	RANDOLPH, R. (2–2)	None	706	2–6	
Feb. 16	vs. FIU*		Swanson Stadium • Fort Meyers, FL	5–8	MURASKIN, A. (2–2)	**Lewis, Jade (2–3)**	None		2–7	
Feb. 16	vs. Memphis*		Swanson Stadium • Fort Meyers, FL	0–3	ALEXANDER, M (1–0)	**Lewis, Jade (2–4)**	NICHOLS, M (1)		2–8	
Feb. 17	at Florida Gulf Coast*		Swanson Stadium • Fort Meyers, FL	4–1	**Kyle, Erin (1–0)**	MESIEMORE, M (2–2)	Voluntad, Julia (1)		3–8	
Cardinal Classic
Feb. 22	Rhode Island*		Lamar Softball Complex • Beaumont, TX	2–1	**Kyle, Erin (2–0)**	GUNDERSON, Sarah (0–2)	**Lewis, Jade (1)**		4–8	
Feb. 22	Maine*		Lamar Softball Complex • Beaumont, TX	4–2	**Voluntad, Julia (1–4)**	Volk, Lilly (0–1)	**Ruiz, Aaliyah (1)**		5–8	
Feb. 23	Rhode Island*		Lamar Softball Complex • Beaumont, TX	4–1	**Voluntad, Julia (2–4)**	ROGERS, Becca (1–2)	None		6–8	
Feb. 23	Maine*		Lamar Softball Complex • Beaumont, TX	7–2	**Kyle, Erin (3–0)**	Reid, Emily (0–1)	None		7–8	
Feb. 24	UTSA*		Lamar Softball Complex • Beaumont, TX	0–9	NELSON, Madison (5–3)	Voluntad, Julia (2–5)	None		7–9	
Feb. 24	Austin Peay*		Lamar Softball Complex • Beaumont, TX	3–0	**Ruiz, Aaliyah (1–0)**	MARDONES, Kelly (2–2)	**Kyle, Erin (1)**	413	8–9	

March (9–11)
Date	Opponent	Rank	Site/stadium	Score	Win	Loss	Save	Attendance	Overall record	SLC Record
Texas A&M Invite
Mar 1	vs. Longwood*		Davis Diamond • College Station, TX	3–6	BACKSTROM, S (5–1)	**Voluntad, Julia (2–6)**	GAY, S. (1)	163	8–10	
Mar 1	at Texas A&M*		Davis Diamond • College Station, TX	1–9	McBRIDE (7–0)	**Ruiz, Aaliyah (1–1)**	None	1,109	8–11	
Mar 2	vs. Texas A&M–Corpus Christi*		Davis Diamond • College Station, TX	4–1	**Savage, Mackenzie (1–0)**	SMITH, ASHLEY (0–7)	**Lewis, Jade (2)**	141	9–11	
Mar 2	at Texas A&M*		Davis Diamond • College Station, TX	7–10	POTTS (3–4)	**Kyle, Erin (3–1)**	None	1,109	9–12	
Mar 3	vs. Longwood*		Davis Diamond • College Station, TX	1–9	GAY, S. (6–3)	**Lewis, Jade (2–5)**	BACKSTROM, S (1)	191	9–13	
Mar 8	Abilene Christian		Lamar Softball Complex • Beaumont, TX	4–1	**Ruiz, Aaliyah (2–1)**	Bradley, Samantha (2–8)	None		10–13	1–0
Mar 8	Abilene Christian		Lamar Softball Complex • Beaumont, TX	3–5	Burris, Calie (3–1)	**Kyle, Erin (3–2)**	Bradley, Samantha (1)	305	10–14	1–1
Mar 9	Abilene Christian		Lamar Softball Complex • Beaumont, TX	5–4	**Voluntad, Julia (3–6)**	Bradley, Samantha (2–9)	None	292	11–14	2–1
Mar 12	at Louisiana Tech*		Lady Techster Softball Complex • Ruston, LA	0–3	GALLAWAY, Pr (7–5)	**Lewis, Jade (2–6)**	DE LA CRUZ, (1)		11–15	
Mar 15	Texas A&M–Corpus Christi		Lamar Softball Complex • Lamar	5–4	**Voluntad, Julia (4–6)**	Smith, Ashley (0–8)	None		12–15	3–1
Mar 15	Texas A&M–Corpus Christi		Lamar Softball Complex • Lamar	5–4	**Kyle, Erin (4–2)**	Tovar, Alexis (0–1)	None	372	13–15	4–1
Mar 16	Texas A&M–Corpus Christi		Lamar Softball Complex • Lamar	9–5	**Kyle, Erin (5–2)**	Tovar, Alexis (0–2)	None	355	14–15	5–1
Mar 15	at LSU*		Tiger Park • Baton Rouge, LA	1–4	Kilponen (4–1)	**Ruiz, Aaliyah (2–2)**	None	1,153	14–16	
Mar 22	at Sam Houston State		Bearkat Softball Complex • Huntsville, TX	2–5	McLeod, Lindsey (7–7)	**Kyle, Erin (5–3)**	None	290	14–17	5–2
Mar 22	at Sam Houston State		Bearkat Softball Complex • Huntsville, TX	2–3	McLeod, Lindsey (8–7)	**Voluntad, Julia (4–7))**	None	290	14–18	5–3
Mar 23	at Sam Houston State		Bearkat Softball Complex • Huntsville, TX	5–3	**Kyle, Erin (6–3)**	Bailey, Annie (2–1)	Voluntad, Julia (2)	200	15–18	6–3
Mar 22	at Texas State*		Bobcat Softball Stadium • San Marcos, TX	1–4	King, M. (9–8)	**Lewis, Jade (2–7)**	None	481	15–19	
Mar 29	Central Arkansas		Lamar Softball Complex • Beaumont, TX	5–8	Coleman, Kamryn (3–5)	**Kyle, Erin (6–4)**	None		15–20	6–4
Mar 29	Central Arkansas		Lamar Softball Complex • Beaumont, TX	2–1	**Voluntad, Julia (5–7)**	Sanchez, Rio (5–6)	None	418	16–20	7–4
Mar 30	Central Arkansas		Lamar Softball Complex • Beaumont, TX	1–0	**Voluntad, Julia (6–7)**	Reaves, Ellie (1–2)	None	399	17–20	8–4

April (6–10)
Date	Opponent	Rank	Site/stadium	Score	Win	Loss	Save	Attendance	Overall record	SLC Record
Apr 3	at Houston*		Cougar Softball Stadium • Houston, TX	0–6	HERTENBERGER (4–1)	**Lewis, Jade (2–8)**	None	433	17–21	
Apr 3	at Stephen F. Austin		SFA Softball Field • Nacogdoches, TX	3–2	**Kyle, Erin (7–4)**	Wilbur, Kassidy (12–11)	None	251	18–21	9–4
Apr 3	at Stephen F. Austin		SFA Softball Field • Nacogdoches, TX	4–1	**Ruiz, Aaliyah (3–2)**	Kriesel, Ashley (8–5)	None	251	19–21	10–4
Apr 3	at Stephen F. Austin		SFA Softball Field • Nacogdoches, TX	2–3	Wilbur, Kassidy (13–11)	**Voluntad, Julia (6–8)**	None	306	19–22	10–5
Apr 12	at Southeastern Louisiana		North Oak Park • Hammond, LA	2–10	McDonald, Alley (9–5)	**Ruiz, Aaliyah (3–3)**	None	218	20–23	10–6
Apr 12	at Southeastern Louisiana		North Oak Park • Hammond, LA	6–5	**Kyle, Erin (8–4)**	Wright, Tanner (5–5)	None	228	20–23	11–6
Apr 13	at Southeastern Louisiana		North Oak Park • Hammond, LA	0–1	McDonald, Alley (10–5)	**Ruiz, Aaliyah (3–4)**	None	249	20–24	11–7
Apr 16	at Baylor*		Getterman Stadium • Waco, TX	0–6	McGlaun (1–1)	**Voluntad, Julia (6–9)**	None		20–25	
Apr 16	at Baylor*		Getterman Stadium • Waco, TX	0–2	Krupit (1–0)	**Kyle, Erin (8–5)**	Holman (2)	590	20–26	
Apr 19	Northwestern State		Lamar Softball Complex • Beaumont, TX	4–3	**Ruiz, Aaliyah (4–4)**	Guile, Samantha (8–9)	None		21–26	12–7
Apr 19	Northwestern State		Lamar Softball Complex • Beaumont, TX	5–6	Delafield, E.C. (7–2)	**Kyle, Erin (8–6)**	Rhoden, Bronte (1)	458	21–27	12–8
Apr 20	Northwestern State		Lamar Softball Complex • Beaumont, TX	5–0	**Ruiz, Aaliyah (5–4)**	Brown, Mikayla (3–6)	None	428	22–27	13–8
Apr 23	Houston Baptist*		Lamar Softball Complex • Beaumont, TX	2–3	Guindon, Emma (10–6)	**Voluntad, Julia (6–10)**	None		22–28	
Apr 26	Nicholls		Lamar Softball Complex • Beaumont, TX	5–4	**Ruiz, Aaliyah (6–4)**	Landry, Megan (22–10)	None	467	23–28	14–8
Apr 27	Nicholls		Lamar Softball Complex • Beaumont, TX	0–3	Landry, Megan (23–10)	**Kyle, Erin (8–7)**	None		23–29	14–9
Apr 27	Nicholls		Lamar Softball Complex • Beaumont, TX	1–3	Danehower, Emily (5–1)	**Ruiz, Aaliyah (6–5)**	None	453	23–30	14–10

May (0–3)
Battle of the Border – Rivalry
May 3	at McNeese	Joe Miller Field at Cowgirl Diamond • Lake Charles, LA	2–8	Flores, Alexsandra (11–9)	**Ruiz, Aaliyah (6–6)**	None		23–31	14–11
May 3	at McNeese	Joe Miller Field at Cowgirl Diamond • Lake Charles, LA	2–3	Settle, Caroline (7–8)	**Kyle, Erin (8–8)**	None	380	23–32	14–12
May 4	at McNeese	Joe Miller Field at Cowgirl Diamond • Lake Charles, LA	3–4	Flores, Alexsandra (12–9)	**Voluntad, Julia (6–11)**	None	408	23–33	14–13

Postseason (0–1)

Southland Tournament (0–1)
Date	Opponent	Rank	Site/stadium	Score	Win	Loss	Save	TV	Attendance	Overall record	Tournament Record
May 7	at Northwestern State (6)	(7)	Lady Demon Diamond • Natchitoches, LA	0–4	Delafield, E.C. (10–3)	**Ruiz, Aaliyah (6–7)**	None	Southland Digital		23–34	0–1

Schedule source:

*Rankings are based on the team's current ranking in the NFCA/USA Softball poll.

=== 1984 Lamar Lady Cardinals softball team ===
1984 Lamar Lady Cardinals softball
- Conference: Southland Conference
- Record: 13–43 (1–7 Southland)
- Head coach: Patty Calvert (2nd season)
- Home stadium: Beaumont Athletic Complex

1984 Southland Conference softball standings
	Conf.						Overall
Team	W		L		T	PCT	W		L		T	PCT
North Zone
Texas–Arlington ^{x}‍‍‍	3	–	1	–	0	.750	26	–	25	–	0	.510
Northeast Louisiana ‍‍‍	5	–	3	–	0	.625	40	–	25	–	0	.615
Arkansas State ‍‍‍	0	–	4	–	0	.000	3	–	14	–	0	.176
South Zone
Southwestern Louisiana ^{x}‍‍‡‍	6	–	2	–	0	.750	28	–	9	–	0	.757
McNeese State ‍‍‍	5	–	3	–	0	.625	24	–	27	–	0	.471
Lamar ‍‍‍	1	–	7	–	0	.125	13	–	43	–	0	.232
x – Division champion ‡ – Tournament champion y – Invited to the NCAA tournament

The 1984 Lamar Lady Cardinals softball team represented Lamar University during the 1984 NCAA Division I softball season. The Lady Cardinals played their home games at the off–campus Beaumont Athletic Complex in Beaumont, Texas as a member of the Southland Conference. The Cardinals were led by head coach Patty Calvert in her second-year at Lamar. The Lady Cardinals finished the season, their second after reinstating the sport in 1983, with an overall record of 13–43 and a 1–7 record in conference play.

==== Roster ====
1984 Lamar Lady Cardinals softball team
Players
Coaches

#	Pos.	Name	Bats/throws	Height	Year	Home town
	INF	Teresa Fuxa	R/	—	Jr
	OF	Belinda Money	R/	—	Sr
	INF	Susan Pence	R/	—	Fr
	INF	Karen Walker	R/	—	Sr
	OF	Tonetta Clark	L/	—	Jr
	OF	Jenifer Ingram	R/	—	Fr
	INF	Michele Gonzalez	S/	—	So
	C	Donna Dugas	L/	—	Fr
	RHP	Karen Castilaw	R/R	—	So
	RHP	Lydia Green	R/R	—	So

Head coach

Patty Calvert – 2nd year

Assistant coach(es)

Legend

- **(C)** Team captain
- **(S)** Suspended
- **(I)** Ineligible
- Injured
- Current redshirt

Roster
Last update: February 14, 2024

==== Schedule and results ====
1984 Lamar Lady Cardinals Softball Game Log
Regular season (13–43)

Date	Opponent	Score	Site/stadium	Overall record	SLC Record
February 28	vs. Evansville*	5–4	Beaumont Athletic Complex • Beaumont, TX	1–0	
February 29	vs. Evansville*	0–8	Beaumont Athletic Complex • Beaumont, TX	1–1	
February 29	vs.Evansville*	3–6	Beaumont Athletic Complex • Beaumont, TX	1–2	
Mardi Gras Invitational
March 2	vs. Northwestern*	0–1	Lady Demon Diamond • Natchitoches, LA	1–3	
March 3	vs. Baylor*	2–8	Lady Demon Diamond • Natchitoches, LA	1–4	
March 4	vs. Northeast Louisiana*	1–2 (8 inn)	Lady Demon Diamond • Natchitoches, LA	1–5	
March 4	vs. Northeast Louisiana*	0–2		1–6	
March 2	vs. Northeast Louisiana*	3–4 (8 inn)		1–7	
	Sam Houston State*	1–4		1–8	
	Sam Houston State*	0–2		1–9	
	vs. Northeast Louisiana*	0–10		1–10	
	vs. Northeast Louisiana*	3–1		2–10	
	Northwestern Louisiana*	3–1		3–10	
	Northwestern Louisiana*	4–3 (9 inn)		4–10	
	Sam Houston State*	0–1		4–11	
	Sam Houston State*	4–5		4–12	
	Quincy College*	2–3		4–13	
	Quincy College*	7–4		5–13	
	Southwest Louisiana	0–5		5–14	0–1
	Southwest Louisiana	0–4		5–15	0–2
	Southwest Louisiana	0–3		5–16	0–3
	Southwest Louisiana	0–7		5–17	0–4
	Northeast Louisiana*	0–2		5–18	
	Northeast Louisiana*	4–6		5–19	
	Incarnate Word*	20–1		6–19	
	Incarnate Word*	18–3		7–19	
	St. Mary's U*	0–1		7–20	
	St. Mary's U*	0–4		7–21	
	Trinity U*	13–0		8–21	
	Trinity U*	11–5		9–21	
Tournament
	Michigan*	0–6		9–22	
	Sam Houston State*	5–6 (10 inn)		9–23	
	Baylor*	2–3 (9 inn)		9–24	
	UT Arlington*	2–8		9–25	
	Northwestern Louisiana*	0–6		9–26	
	Northwestern Louisiana*	4–9		9–27	
	Stephen F. Austin*	0–1		9–28	
	Stephen F. Austin*	1–4		9–29	
	McNeese State	1–3		9–30	0–5
	McNeese State	2–3		9–31	0–6
	McNeese State	2–0		10–31	1–6
	McNeese State	2–7		10–32	1–7
University of Texas–Arlington Invitational
	Baylor*	0–7	Allan Saxe Field • Arlington, TX	10–33	
	Texas Wesleyan*	4–7	Allan Saxe Field • Arlington, TX	10–34	
	Texas Tech	1–0	Allan Saxe Field • Arlington, TX	11–34	
	Sam Houston State*	2–7	Allan Saxe Field • Arlington, TX	11–35	
	Central State*	6–1	Allan Saxe Field • Arlington, TX	12–35	
	Texas Wesleyan*	4–5 (9 inn)	Allan Saxe Field • Arlington, TX	12–36	
	Stephen F Austin*	0–2	Beaumont Athletic Complex • Beaumont, TX	12–37	
	Stephen F Austin*	2–1	Beaumont Athletic Complex • Beaumont, TX	13–37	
	St. Mary's U*	1–2	Beaumont Athletic Complex • Beaumont, TX	13–38	
	St. Mary's U*	1–4	Beaumont Athletic Complex • Beaumont, TX	12–39	
	St. Mary's U*	3–5	Beaumont Athletic Complex • Beaumont, TX	13–40	
	St. Mary's U*	1–9	Beaumont Athletic Complex • Beaumont, TX	13–41	

Postseason (0–2)

Southland Tournament (0–2)
Date	Opponent	Score	Site/stadium	Overall record	Tournament record
	Northeast Louisiana	0–1	Lafayette, LA	13–42	0–1
	UT Arlington	4–18	Lafayette, LA	13–43	0–2

Schedule source:
