= 1984 Southland Conference softball tournament =

- Teams: 6
- Format: Double-elimination tournament
- Finals site: Lafayette, Louisiana
- Champions: Southwestern Louisiana (1st title)
- Winning coach: Yvette Girouard (1 title)

1984 Southland Conference softball standings
| | Conf. | | | | | | Overall |
| Team | W | | L | | T | PCT | W | | L | | T | PCT |
|---|---|---|---|---|---|---|---|---|---|---|---|---|
North Zone
| Texas–Arlington ^{x}‍‍‍ | 3 | – | 1 | – | 0 | .750 | 26 | – | 25 | – | 0 | .510 |
| Northeast Louisiana ‍‍‍ | 5 | – | 3 | – | 0 | .625 | 40 | – | 25 | – | 0 | .615 |
| Arkansas State ‍‍‍ | 0 | – | 4 | – | 0 | .000 | 3 | – | 14 | – | 0 | .176 |
South Zone
| Southwestern Louisiana ^{x}‍‍‡‍ | 6 | – | 2 | – | 0 | .750 | 28 | – | 9 | – | 0 | .757 |
| McNeese State ‍‍‍ | 5 | – | 3 | – | 0 | .625 | 24 | – | 27 | – | 0 | .471 |
| Lamar ‍‍‍ | 1 | – | 7 | – | 0 | .125 | 13 | – | 43 | – | 0 | .232 |
x – Division champion ‡ – Tournament champion y – Invited to the NCAA tournament As of May 20, 1984; Rankings from Coaches' Poll

The 1984 Southland Conference tournament was held in Lafayette, LouisianaSouthwestern Louisiana won the six team tournament. Their season ended with the tournament championship as the Lady Cajuns were not selected to the compete in the 1984 NCAA Division I softball tournament.

== Format ==
The tournament was a 6 team double elimination format. All teams which competed in conference play were members of the tournament field. North and South Zone division winners, Texas-Arlington and Southwestern Louisiana respectively, received byes in first round competition.

== Tournament ==
| Round | Game | Matchup | Score | Notes |
First round
| 1 | 1 | McNeese State vs. Arkansas State | 2–1 | McNeese State wins |
| 1 | 2 | Northeast Louisiana vs. Lamar | 1–0 | Northeast Louisiana wins |
Winner's Bracket
| 2 | 3 | McNeese State vs. Texas-Arlington | 2–1 | McNeese State wins |
| 2 | 4 | Southwestern Louisiana vs. Northeast Louisiana | 2–1 | Southwestern Louisiana wins |
Consolation Bracket
| 3 | 5 | Texas-Arlington vs. Lamar | 18–4 | Lamar eliminated |
| 3 | 6 | Northeast Louisiana vs. Arkansas State | 11–3 | Arkansas State eliminated |
| 3 | 7 | Northeast Louisiana vs. Texas-Arlington | 1–0 | Texas-Arlington eliminated |
Semifinals
| 4 | 8 | Southwestern Louisiana vs. McNeese State | 1–0 | Southwestern Louisiana wins |
| 4 | 9 | Northeast Louisiana vs. McNeese State | 2–0 | McNeese State eliminated |
Championship
| 5 | 10 | Southwestern Louisiana vs. Northeast Louisiana | 2–0 | Southwestern Louisiana wins championship |
