= 1983 UCLA Bruins softball team =

American college softball season

1983 UCLA Bruins softball

NCAA Northeast Regional champion WCAA co-champion

Women's College World Series
- Conference: Western Collegiate Athletic Association
- Record: 40–7 (17–3 WCAA)
- Head coach: Sharron Backus (9th season)
- Home stadium: Sunset Field

1983 Western Collegiate Athletic Association softball standings
	Conf.						Overall
Team	W		L		T	PCT	W		L		T	PCT
Cal State Fullerton ‍†‍‍^{y}	17	–	3	–	0	.850	56	–	15	–	0	.789
UCLA ‍†‍‍^{y}	17	–	3	–	0	.850	40	–	7	–	0	.851
Arizona State ‍‍‍	9	–	12	–	1	.432	22	–	19	–	1	.536
Arizona ‍‍‍	7	–	12	–	0	.368	20	–	24	–	0	.455
San Diego State ‍‍‍	5	–	15	–	0	.250	18	–	21	–	1	.463
Long Beach State ‍‍‍	4	–	14	–	1	.237	15	–	32	–	2	.327
† – Conference champion y – Invited to the NCAA tournament

The 1983 UCLA Bruins softball team represented the University of California, Los Angeles in the 1983 NCAA Division I softball season. The Bruins were coached by Sharron Backus, who led her ninth season. The Bruins played their home games at Sunset Field and finished with a record of 40–7. They competed in the Western Collegiate Athletic Association, where they finished tied for first with a 17–3 record.

The Bruins were invited to the 1983 NCAA Division I softball tournament, where they swept the Northeast Regional to advance to the Women's College World Series for the second consecutive year. They finished third after defeating Missouri, Louisiana Tech, and South Carolina and losing to eventual runner-up Cal State Fullerton and eventual champion Texas A&M.

== Personnel ==
=== Roster ===
1983 UCLA Bruins roster
Pitchers: 3 - Tracy Compton - Sophomore; 17 - Debbie Doom - Sophomore; Catchers: 7 - Janet Pinneau - - Freshman; 14 - Michele Aguilar - Senior	Infielders: 1 - Dot Richardson - Senior; 12 - Sue Eskierski - Senior; 13 - Stacy Winsberg - Sophomore; 14 - Diane Batham - - Freshman; 16 - Sheila Cornell - Junior	Outfielders: 2 - Leslie Rover - Sophomore; 8 - Barbara Young - Junior; 10 - Mary Ricks - - Freshman; 19 - Barbara Booth - Senior; Utility: 5 - Priscilla Rouse - Freshman

=== Coaches ===
1983 UCLA Bruins softball coaching staff
- Sharron Backus - 9th season
- Sue Enquist - 4th season

== Schedule ==
Legend
	UCLA win
	UCLA loss
	Tie
*	Non-Conference game

1983 UCLA Bruins softball game log
Regular season

February
Date	Opponent	Site/stadium	Score	Overall record	WCAA Record
Feb 16	Cal State Dominguez Hills*	Sunset Field • Los Angeles, CA	W 6–0	1–0	
Feb 16	Cal State Domiguez Hills*	Sunset Field • Los Angeles, CA	W 1–0	2–0	
Feb 23	at Cal State Northridge*	Matador Diamond • Northridge, CA	W 4–0	3–0	
Feb 23	at Cal State Northridge*	Matador Diamond • Northridge, CA	W 3–0^{8}	4–0	

March
Date	Opponent	Site/stadium	Score	Overall record	WCAA Record
Mar 7	Creighton*	Sunset Field • Los Angeles, CA	W 7–0	5–0	
Mar 7	Creighton*	Sunset Field • Los Angeles, CA	W 1–0^{11}	6–0	
Mar 9	UC Santa Barbara*	Sunset Field • Los Angeles, CA	W 1–0	7–0	
Mar 9	UC Santa Barbara*	Sunset Field • Los Angeles, CA	W 4–0	8–0	
Mar 12	at Cal Poly Pomona*	Pomona, CA	W 2–0^{9}	9–0	
Mar 12	at Cal Poly Pomona*	Pomona, CA	L 2–3	9–1	

April
Date	Opponent	Site/stadium	Score	Overall record	WCAA Record
Apr 1	at Arizona State	Tempe, AZ	L 1–2^{8}	9–2	0–1
Apr 1	at Arizona State	Tempe, AZ	W 2–0	10–2	1–1
Apr 2	at Arizona	UA Softball Field • Tucson, AZ	W 4–0	11–2	2–1
Apr 2	at Arizona	UA Softball Field • Tucson, AZ	W 5–0	12–2	3–1
Apr 5	Cal State Fullerton	Sunset Field • Los Angeles, CA	W 4–1	13–2	4–1
Apr 5	Cal State Fullerton	Sunset Field • Los Angeles, CA	L 0–5	13–3	4–2
Apr 8	vs Idaho State*	Las Cruces, NM (New Mexico Invitational)	W 1–0^{8}	14–3	
Apr 8	vs San Francisco*	Las Cruces, NM (New Mexico Invitational)	W 4–0	15–3	
Apr 9	vs Oregon State*	Las Cruces, NM (New Mexico Invitational)	W 1–0	16–3	
Apr 10	vs US International*	Las Cruces, NM (New Mexico Invitational)	L 0–2	16–4	
Apr 12	Long Beach State	Sunset Field • Los Angeles, CA	W 8–0	17–4	5–2
Apr 12	Long Beach State	Sunset Field • Los Angeles, CA	W 2–1	18–4	6–2
Apr 15	at San Diego State	San Diego, CA	W 1–0	19–4	7–2
Apr 15	at San Diego State	San Diego, CA	W 2–0	20–4	8–2
Apr 16	at US International*	San Diego, CA	W 4–0	21–4	
Apr 16	at US International*	San Diego, CA	W 5–0	22–4	
Apr 19	Cal Poly Pomona*	Sunset Field • Los Angeles, CA	W 2–0	23–4	
Apr 19	Cal Poly Pomona*	Sunset Field • Los Angeles, CA	W 2–0	24–4	
Apr 26	at UC Santa Barbara*	Santa Barbara, CA	W 4–0	25–4	
Apr 26	at UC Santa Barbara*	Santa Barbara, CA	W 3–1	26–4	
Apr 30	Arizona State	Sunset Field • Los Angeles, CA	W 3–0	27–4	9–2
Apr 30	Arizona State	Sunset Field • Los Angeles, CA	W 1–0	28–4	10–2

May
Date	Opponent	Site/stadium	Score	Overall record	WCAA Record
May 1	Arizona	Sunset Field • Los Angeles, CA	W 1–0	29–4	11–2
May 1	Arizona	Sunset Field • Los Angeles, CA	W 1–0^{8}	30–4	12–2
May 3	at Cal State Fullerton	Lions Field • Fullerton, CA	L 0–1	30–5	12–3
May 3	at Cal State Fullerton	Lions Field • Fullerton, CA	W 1–0	31–5	13–3
May 5	at Long Beach State	Long Beach, CA	W 5–1	32–5	14–3
May 5	at Long Beach State	Long Beach, CA	W 3–0	33–5	15–3
May 6	San Diego State	Sunset Field • Los Angeles, CA	W 1–0^{12}	34–5	16–3
May 6	San Diego State	Sunset Field • Los Angeles, CA	W 1–0	35–5	17–3

Postseason

NCAA Northeast Regional
Date	Opponent	Site/stadium	Score	Overall record	NCAAT record
May 13	at Rhode Island	Kingston, RI	W 1–0^{9}	36–5	1–0
May 14	at Rhode Island	Kingston, RI	W 1–0^{12}	37–5	2–0

NCAA Women's College World Series
Date	Opponent	Site/stadium	Score	Overall record	WCWS Record
May 26	Missouri	Seymour Smith Park • Omaha, NE	W 1–0	38–5	1–0
May 26	Louisiana Tech	Seymour Smith Park • Omaha, NE	W 8–0	39–5	2–0
May 28	Cal State Fullerton	Seymour Smith Park • Omaha, NE	L 1–6	39–6	2–1
May 28	South Carolina	Seymour Smith Park • Omaha, NE	W 2–1^{17}	40–6	3–1
May 29	Texas A&M	Seymour Smith Park • Omaha, NE	L 0–1^{14}	40–7	3–2
