= 1985 NCAA Division I softball season =

American college softball season

- Defending Champions: UCLA

Tournament

Women's College World Series
- Duration: May 22–26, 1985
- Champions: UCLA (3rd NCAA (4th overall) WCWS title)
- Runners-up: Nebraska (3rd WCWS Appearance)
- Winning Coach: Sharron Backus (3rd NCAA (4th overall) WCWS title)

Seasons
- ← 1984 1986 →

The 1985 NCAA Division I softball season, play of college softball in the United States organized by the National Collegiate Athletic Association (NCAA) at the Division I level, began in February 1985. The season progressed through a regular season, various conference tournaments and championship series, and concluded with the 1985 NCAA Division I Softball Tournament and the 1985 Women's College World Series. The Women's College World Series, consisting of the eight remaining teams in the NCAA Tournament and held in Omaha, Nebraska at Seymour Smith Park, ended on May 26, 1985.

== Conference standings ==
1985 Big Eight Conference softball standings
	Conf.				Overall
Team	W		L	PCT	W		L	PCT
Nebraska ‍†‍‡‍^{y}	38	–	11	.776	11	–	1	.917
Kansas ‍‍‍^{y}	38	–	17	.691	7	–	5	.583
Missouri ‍‍‍	29	–	23	.558	6	–	6	.500
Iowa State ‍‍‍	35	–	19	.648	6	–	6	.500
Oklahoma State ‍‍‍	30	–	15	.667	6	–	6	.500
Oklahoma ‍‍‍	24	–	18	.571	5	–	7	.417
Kansas State ‍‍‍		–		–	1	–	11	.083
† – Conference champion ‡ – Tournament champion y – Invited to the NCAA tournament

1985 Big Ten Conference softball standings
	Conf.						Overall
Team	W		L		T	PCT	W		L		T	PCT
Northwestern ‍†‍‍^{y}	20	–	4	–	0	.833	40	–	12	–	1	.764
Indiana ‍‍‍	16	–	8	–	0	.667	49	–	18	–	1	.728
Michigan ‍‍‍	16	–	8	–	0	.667	28	–	20	–	0	.583
Iowa ‍‍‍	11	–	13	–	0	.458	22	–	26	–	0	.458
Minnesota ‍‍‍	8	–	12	–	0	.400	25	–	24	–	0	.510
Michigan State ‍‍‍	8	–	12	–	0	.400	18	–	29	–	0	.383
Ohio State ‍‍‍	3	–	21	–	0	.125	10	–	35	–	0	.222
† – Conference champion y – Invited to the NCAA tournament

1985 Southland Conference softball standings
	Conf.				Overall
Team	W		L	PCT	W		L	PCT
Southwestern Louisiana ‍†‍‍	12	–	0	1.000	39	–	13	.750
Texas–Arlington ‍‍‍	8	–	4	.667	27	–	22	.551
Northeast Louisiana ‍‍‡‍	7	–	5	.583	34	–	32	.515
McNeese State ‍‍‍	7	–	5	.583	19	–	31	.380
Lamar ‍‍‍	6	–	6	.500	14	–	28	.333
North Texas ‍‍‍	2	–	10	.167	9	–	28	.243
Arkansas State ‍‍‍	0	–	12	.000	2	–	27	.069
† – Conference champion ‡ – Tournament champion y – Invited to the NCAA tournament

1985 Western Collegiate Athletic Association softball standings
	Conf.				Overall
Team	W		L	PCT	W		L	PCT
Cal State Fullerton ‍†‍‍^{y}	12	–	0	1.000	54	–	10	.844
UCLA ‍‍‍^{y}	9	–	3	.750	41	–	9	.820
Arizona State ‍‍‍^{y}	6	–	6	.500	38	–	17	.691
Long Beach State ‍‍‍	6	–	6	.500	25	–	19	.568
Arizona ‍‍‍	5	–	7	.417	17	–	16	.515
San Diego State ‍‍‍	4	–	8	.333	37	–	38	.493
Stanford ‍‍‍	0	–	12	.000	10	–	51	.164
† – Conference champion y – Invited to the NCAA tournament

== Women's College World Series ==
The 1985 NCAA Women's College World Series took place from May 22 to May 26, 1985 in Omaha, Nebraska.

Upper round 1
Cal State Fullerton	1^{8}
Adelphi	0
Utah	0
UCLA	1
Northwestern	3
Cal Poly Pomona	6
Louisiana Tech	0
Nebraska	6

Upper round 2
Cal State Fullerton	2
UCLA	0
Cal Poly Pomona	0
Nebraska	2
Lower round 1
Adelphi	1
Utah	0
Northwestern	1^{8}
Louisiana Tech	0

Upper final
Cal State Fullerton	1
Nebraska	5
Lower round 2
Cal Poly Pomona	1^{8}
Adelphi	0
UCLA	1
Northwestern	0

Semifinals
Nebraska	0
UCLA	3
Cal State Fullerton	2^{8}
Cal Poly Pomona	1

Preliminary final
UCLA	1
Cal State Fullerton	0

Final
Nebraska	1
UCLA	2^{9}

== Season leaders ==
Batting

- Batting average: .488 – Mary Baldauf, Harvard Crimson
- RBIs: 50 – Karen Allen, Nicholls Colonels
- Home runs: 18 – Liz Mizera, Texas A&M Aggies

Pitching

- WINS: 48-16 – Rhonda Wheatley, Cal Poly Pomona Broncos
- ERA: 0.08 (2 ER/167.1 IP) – Tracy Compton, UCLA Bruins
- Strikeouts: 337 – Julie Buldoc, Adelphi Panthers

== Records ==
NCAA Division I season innings pitched: 434.1 – Rhonda Wheatley, Cal Poly Pomona Broncos

Sophomore class scoreless innings streak: 90.0 – Lisa Ishikawa, Northwestern Wildcats; 1985

Sophomore class WHIP: 0.39 (66 H+50 BB/298.0 IP) – Shawn Andaya, Texas A&M Aggies

Senior class ERA: 0.08 (2 ER/167.1 IP) – Tracy Compton, UCLA Bruins

Team double plays: 82 – UC Santa Barbara Gauchos

Team single game hits: 41 – Canisius Golden Griffins, May 1, 1985

Team single game runs: 48 – Canisius Golden Griffins, May 1, 1985

Team single game RBIs: 39 – Canisius Golden Griffins, May 1, 1985

Team largest victory margin: 43 – Canisius Golden Griffins, May 1, 1985

== Awards ==
- Honda Sports Award Softball:

Denise Eckert, Nebraska Cornhuskers

YEAR	G	AB	R	H	BA	RBI	HR	3B	2B	TB	SLG	BB	SO	SB	SBA
1985	49	145	29	52	.358	37	11	5	5	100	.689%	10	15	3	5
