= 1984 NCAA Division I softball season =

Intercollegiate softball season

- Defending Champions: Texas A&M

Tournament

Women's College World Series
- Champions: UCLA (2nd NCAA (3rd overall) WCWS title)
- Runners-up: Texas A&M (2nd WCWS Appearance)
- Winning Coach: Sharron Backus (2nd NCAA (3rd overall) WCWS title)

Seasons
- ← 1983 1985 →

The 1984 NCAA Division I softball season, play of college softball in the United States organized by the National Collegiate Athletic Association (NCAA) at the Division I level, began in February 1984. The season progressed through the regular season, many conference tournaments and championship series, and concluded with the 1984 NCAA Division I softball tournament and 1984 Women's College World Series. The Women's College World Series, consisting of the eight remaining teams in the NCAA Tournament and held in Omaha, Nebraska at Seymour Smith Park, ended on May 29, 1984.

== Conference standings ==
1984 Big Ten Conference softball standings
	Conf.						Overall
Team	W		L		T	PCT	W		L		T	PCT
Northwestern ‍†‍‍^{y}	14	–	4	–	0	.778	41	–	17	–	0	.707
Minnesota ‍‍‍	14	–	8	–	0	.636	30	–	19	–	0	.612
Indiana ‍‍‍	14	–	10	–	0	.583	38	–	22	–	0	.633
Michigan ‍‍‍	12	–	12	–	0	.500	32	–	24	–	0	.571
Iowa ‍‍‍	10	–	14	–	0	.417	24	–	28	–	0	.462
Michigan State ‍‍‍	8	–	15	–	0	.348	22	–	26	–	1	.459
Ohio State ‍‍‍	6	–	18	–	0	.250	20	–	25	–	0	.444
† – Conference champion y – Invited to the NCAA tournament

1984 Southland Conference softball standings
	Conf.						Overall
Team	W		L		T	PCT	W		L		T	PCT
North Zone
Texas–Arlington ^{x}‍‍‍	3	–	1	–	0	.750	26	–	25	–	0	.510
Northeast Louisiana ‍‍‍	5	–	3	–	0	.625	40	–	25	–	0	.615
Arkansas State ‍‍‍	0	–	4	–	0	.000	3	–	14	–	0	.176
South Zone
Southwestern Louisiana ^{x}‍‍‡‍	6	–	2	–	0	.750	28	–	9	–	0	.757
McNeese State ‍‍‍	5	–	3	–	0	.625	24	–	27	–	0	.471
Lamar ‍‍‍	1	–	7	–	0	.125	13	–	43	–	0	.232
x – Division champion ‡ – Tournament champion y – Invited to the NCAA tournament

1984 Western Collegiate Athletic Association softball standings
	Conf.						Overall
Team	W		L		T	PCT	W		L		T	PCT
Cal State Fullerton ‍‍‍	7	–	3	–	0	.700	54	–	12	–	0	.818
UCLA ‍†‍‍^{y}	7	–	3	–	0	.700	45	–	6	–	0	.882
Arizona State ‍‍‍^{y}	6	–	4	–	0	.600	33	–	15	–	0	.688
Arizona ‍‍‍	5	–	5	–	0	.500	28	–	16	–	0	.636
Long Beach State ‍‍‍	4	–	6	–	0	.400	22	–	19	–	0	.537
San Diego State ‍‍‍	1	–	9	–	0	.100	21	–	31	–	0	.404
† – Conference champion y – Invited to the NCAA tournament

== Women's College World Series ==
The 1984 NCAA Women's College World Series took place from May 23 to May 29, 1984 in Omaha, Nebraska.

Upper round 1
UCLA	6
Utah State	0
Northwestern	1
Adelphi	0
Texas A&M	1^{25}
Cal Poly Pomona	0
Nebraska	2
Fresno State	0

Upper round 2
UCLA	1^{9}
Northwestern	0
Texas A&M	5
Nebraska	2
Lower round 1
Utah State	0
Adelphi	1
Cal Poly Pomona	0
Fresno State	1

Upper final
UCLA	0
Texas A&M	2^{8}
Lower round 2
Nebraska	2
Adelphi	1
Northwestern	3
Fresno State	0

Semifinals
Texas A&M	1^{14}
Northwestern	0
UCLA	1^{8}
Nebraska	0

Final
Texas A&M	0	0
UCLA	1	1^{13}

== Season leaders ==
Batting

- Batting average: .428 – Mary Wallace, Adelphi Panthers
- RBIs: 43 – Michelle Turk, Penn State Nittany Lions
- Home runs: 11 – Karen Nichols, Nicholls Colonels

Pitching

- Wins: 33-7 – Lisa Ishikawa, Northwestern Wildcats
- ERA: 0.09 (2 ER/147.0 IP) – Terri Higgins, Adelphi Panthers
- Strikeouts: 469 – Lisa Ishikawa, Northwestern Wildcats

== Records ==
NCAA Division I single game putouts: 35 – Laura Meyers, Cal Poly Pomona Broncos; May 24, 1984 (25 innings)

Junior class single game runs: 6 – Terri Tucker, Adelphi Panthers; April 9, 1984

Freshman class single game innings pitched: 25.0 – Shawn Andaya, Texas A&M Aggies; May 24, 1984

Junior class scoreless innings streak: 102.0 – Debbie Doom, UCLA Bruins; February 24-April 6, 1984

Freshman class no-hitters: 5 – Lisa Ishikawa, Northwestern Wildcats

Freshman class WHIP: 0.39 (30 H+15 BB/115.0 IP) – Shelley Berube, Florida State Seminoles

Junior class ERA: 0.10 (3 ER/215.1 IP) – Debbie Doom, UCLA Bruins

Team ERA: 0.10 (10 ER/397.0 IP) – UCLA Bruins

== Awards ==
- Honda Sports Award Softball:

Debbie Doom, UCLA Bruins

YEAR	W	L	GP	GS	CG	SHO	SV	IP	H	R	ER	BB	SO	ERA	WHIP
1984	24	3	28	27	27	24	0	215.1	77	5	3	29	282	0.10	0.49
