= 1984 UCLA Bruins softball team =

American college softball season

1984 UCLA Bruins softball

National Champion NCAA West Regional champion
- Conference: Western Collegiate Athletic Association
- Record: 45–6–1 (7–3 WCAA)
- Head coach: Sharron Backus (10th season)
- Home stadium: Sunset Field

1984 Western Collegiate Athletic Association softball standings
	Conf.						Overall
Team	W		L		T	PCT	W		L		T	PCT
Cal State Fullerton ‍‍‍	7	–	3	–	0	.700	54	–	12	–	0	.818
UCLA ‍†‍‍^{y}	7	–	3	–	0	.700	45	–	6	–	0	.882
Arizona State ‍‍‍^{y}	6	–	4	–	0	.600	33	–	15	–	0	.688
Arizona ‍‍‍	5	–	5	–	0	.500	28	–	16	–	0	.636
Long Beach State ‍‍‍	4	–	6	–	0	.400	22	–	19	–	0	.537
San Diego State ‍‍‍	1	–	9	–	0	.100	21	–	31	–	0	.404
† – Conference champion y – Invited to the NCAA tournament

The 1984 UCLA Bruins softball team represented the University of California, Los Angeles in the 1984 NCAA Division I softball season. The Bruins were coached by Sharron Backus, who led her tenth season. The Bruins played their home games at Sunset Field and finished with a record of 45–6–1. They competed in the Western Collegiate Athletic Association, where they finished first with a 7–3 record.

The Bruins were invited to the 1984 NCAA Division I softball tournament, where they swept the West Regional and then completed a run through the Women's College World Series to claim their second NCAA Women's College World Series Championship. The Bruins had earlier claimed an AIAW title in 1978 and the first NCAA event in 1982.

== Personnel ==
=== Roster ===
1984 UCLA Bruins roster
Pitchers: 3 – Tracy Compton – junior; 6 – Tricia Mang – freshman; 17 - Debbie Doom – junior; Catchers: 5 – Kaelyn Silva – freshman; 19 – Janet Pinneau – sophomore	Infielders: 1 – Gina Holmstrom – freshman; 4 – Shauna Wattenberg – freshman; 5 – Jennifer Simm – junior; 7 – Cheryl Dazalla – freshman; 12 – Leslie Rover – junior; 16 - Sheila Cornell – senior	Outfielders: 2 – Stacey Shire – freshman; 8 – Barbara Young – senior; 10 – Mary Ricks – sophomore; 11 – Debbie Ruelas – freshman; 13 – Stacy Winsberg – junior

=== Coaches ===
1984 UCLA Bruins softball coaching staff
- Sharron Backus - 10th season
- Sue Enquist - 5th season
- Kirk Walker - 1st season

== Schedule ==
Legend
	UCLA win
	UCLA loss
	Tie
*	Non-Conference game

1984 UCLA Bruins softball game log
Regular season

February
Date	Opponent	Site/stadium	Score	Overall record	WCAA Record
Feb 21	Cal State Northridge*	Sunset Field • Los Angeles, CA	L 0–1	0–1	
Feb 21	Cal State Northridge*	Sunset Field • Los Angeles, CA	W 5–2	1–1	
Feb 24	Michigan*	Sunset Field • Los Angeles, CA	W 2–0	2–1	
Feb 24	Michigan*	Sunset Field • Los Angeles, CA	W 7–1	3–1	
Feb 28	at UC Santa Barbara*	Santa Barbara, CA	W 4–1	4–1	
Feb 28	at UC Santa Barbara*	Santa Barbara, CA	W 9–0	5–1	
Feb 29	US International*	Sunset Field • Los Angeles, CA	W 3–0	6–1	
Feb 29	US International*	Sunset Field • Los Angeles, CA	W 3–0	7–1	

March
Date	Opponent	Site/stadium	Score	Overall record	WCAA Record
Mar 6	at Cal State Dominguez Hills*	Carson, CA	W 2–0	8–1	
Mar 6	at Cal State Dominguez Hills*	Carson, CA	W 2–0	9–1	
Mar 8	Pacific*	Sunset Field • Los Angeles, CA	W 2–0	10–1	
Mar 8	Pacific*	Sunset Field • Los Angeles, CA	W 3–0	11–1	
Mar 10	San Diego State*	Sunset Field • Los Angeles, CA	W 3–0	12–1	
Mar 10	San Diego State*	Sunset Field • Los Angeles, CA	W 2–0^{8}	13–1	
Mar 13	Long Beach State*	Sunset Field • Los Angeles, CA	W 1–0^{8}	14–1	
Mar 13	Long Beach State*	Sunset Field • Los Angeles, CA	W 1–0	15–1	
Mar 16	Creighton*	Sunset Field • Los Angeles, CA	W 1–0^{14}	16–1	
Mar 16	Creighton*	Sunset Field • Los Angeles, CA	W 2–0	17–1	
Mar 26	California*	Sunset Field • Los Angeles, CA	W 1–0	18–1	
Mar 26	California*	Sunset Field • Los Angeles, CA	W 4–0	19–1	
Mar 30	Arizona	Sunset Field • Los Angeles, CA	W 1–0^{10}	20–1	1–0
Mar 30	Arizona	Sunset Field • Los Angeles, CA	W 1–0	21–1	2–0
Mar 31	Arizona State	Sunset Field • Los Angeles, CA	L 1–2	21–2	2–1
Mar 31	Arizona State	Sunset Field • Los Angeles, CA	W 1–0	22–2	3–1

April
Date	Opponent	Site/stadium	Score	Overall record	WCAA Record
Apr 3	Cal Poly Pomona*	Sunset Field • Los Angeles, CA	W 1–0^{10}	23–2	
Apr 3	Cal Poly Pomona*	Sunset Field • Los Angeles, CA	W 1–0	24–2	
Apr 6	at Chapman*	Orange, CA	W 1–0	25–2	
Apr 6	at Chapman*	Orange, CA	W 6–1	26–2	
Apr 10	at Long Beach State	Long Beach, CA	L 0–1^{11}	26–3	3–2
Apr 10	at Long Beach State	Long Beach, CA	W 2–1	27–3	4–2
Apr 13	vs Northern Colorado*	Albuquerque, NM	W 6–0	28–3	
Apr 13	vs Northern Colorado*	Albuquerque, NM	W 5–0	29–3	
Apr 14	vs Utah State*	Albuquerque, NM	W 3–0	30–3	
Apr 14	vs Utah State*	Albuquerque, NM	L 0–2	30–4	
Apr 15	at New Mexico*	Albuquerque, NM	W 3–1	31–4	
Apr 15	at New Mexico*	Albuquerque, NM	W 3–0	32–4	
Apr 19	UC Santa Barbara*	Sunset Field • Los Angeles, CA	W 2–0	33–4	
Apr 19	UC Santa Barbara*	Sunset Field • Los Angeles, CA	W 3–0	34–4	
Apr 21	at Cal Poly Pomona*	Pomona, CA	W 1–0^{13}	35–4	
Apr 21	at Cal Poly Pomona*	Pomona, CA	T 0–0^{8}	35–4–1	
Apr 24	at San Diego State	San Diego, CA	W 2–0	36–4–1	5–2
Apr 24	at San Diego State	San Diego, CA	W 2–0	37–4–1	6–2

May
Date	Opponent	Site/stadium	Score	Overall record	WCAA Record
May 7	Cal State Fullerton	Sunset Field • Los Angeles, CA	L 4–5	37–5–1	6–3
May 7	Cal State Fullerton	Sunset Field • Los Angeles, CA	W 2–0^{8}	38–5–1	7–3

Postseason

NCAA West Regional
Date	Opponent	Site/stadium	Score	Overall record	NCAAT record
May 17	Arizona State	Mayfair Park • Lakewood, CA	W 1–0	39–5–1	1–0
May 18	Arizona State	Mayfair Park • Lakewood, CA	W 3–0	40–5–1	2–0

NCAA Women's College World Series
Date	Opponent	Site/stadium	Score	Overall record	WCWS Record
May 23	Utah State	Seymour Smith Park • Omaha, NE	W 6–0	41–5–1	1–0
May 26	Northwestern	Seymour Smith Park • Omaha, NE	W 1–0^{9}	42–5–1	2–0
May 28	Texas A&M	Seymour Smith Park • Omaha, NE	L 0–2	42–6–1	2–1
May 28	Nebraska	Seymour Smith Park • Omaha, NE	W 1–0	43–6–1	3–1
May 29	Texas A&M	Seymour Smith Park • Omaha, NE	W 1–0	44–6–1	4–1
May 29	Texas A&M	Seymour Smith Park • Omaha, NE	W 1–0^{13}	45–6–1	5–1
