= 1984 Texas A&M Aggies softball team =

American college softball season

1984 Texas A&M Aggies softball

NCAA At-large Regional champion

Women's College World Series, runner-up
- Conference: Independent
- Record: 51–18
- Head coach: Bob Brock (3rd season)

The 1984 Texas A&M Aggies softball team represented Texas A&M University in the 1984 NCAA Division I softball season. The Aggies were coached by Bob Brock, who led his third season. The Bulldogs finished with a record of 51–18.

The Aggies were invited to the 1984 NCAA Division I Softball Tournament, where they swept the NCAA Regional and then completed a run to the title game of the Women's College World Series where they fell to champion UCLA.

== Roster ==
1984 Texas A&M Aggies roster
Pitchers: - Shawn Andaya - Freshman; Catchers: - Guy McNutt - Junior; Outfielders: - Josie Carter - Junior; - Cindy Foster - Sophomore; - Iva Jackson - Junior	Infielders: - Cindy Cooper - Sophomore; - Pattie Holthaus - Senior; - Mary Schwind - Sophomore; - Judy Trussell - Freshman	Unknown: - Ann Hadley; - Linda Lancaster; - Yvette Lopez; - Tiffany Ohnstad; - Paige Peterson; - Debbie Rollman; - Rose Ruffino

== Schedule ==
Legend
	Texas A&M win
	Texas A&M loss
*	Non-Conference game

1984 Texas A&M Aggies softball game log
Regular season

February/March
Date	Opponent	Site/stadium	Score	Overall record
Feb 27	vs Evansville	College Station, TX	W 8–0	1–0
Mar 1	Ball State	Colonels Softball Diamond • Thibodaux, LA	W 1–0	2–0
Mar 1	vs Florida A&M	Colonels Softball Diamond • Thibodaux, LA	W 14–0	3–0
Mar 1	at Nicholls State	Colonels Softball Diamond • Thibodaux, LA	W 6–0	4–0
Mar 2	vs Florida State	Colonels Softball Diamond • Thibodaux, LA	W 6–2	5–0
Mar 2	vs Louisiana Tech	Colonels Softball Diamond • Thibodaux, LA	W 1–0	6–0
Mar 2	vs Northwestern	Colonels Softball Diamond • Thibodaux, LA	W 2–0	7–0
Mar 6	at Texas–Arlington	Arlington Athletic Center • Arlington, TX	W 5–0	8–0
Mar 6	at Texas–Arlington	Arlington Athletic Center • Arlington, TX	W 12–0	9–0
Mar 8	Baylor	College Station, TX	L 0–3	9–1
Mar 8	Baylor	College Station, TX	W 2–1	10–1
Mar 11	Missouri	College Station, TX	W 2–0	11–1
Mar 11	Missouri	College Station, TX	L 0–1	11–2
Mar 16	vs New Mexico	Norman, OK (Oklahoma Invitational)	W 2–0	12–2
Mar 16	vs Southern Illinois	Norman, OK (Oklahoma Invitational)	W 1–0	13–2
Mar 16	vs Iowa State	Norman, OK (Oklahoma Invitational)	W 4–0	14–2
Mar 17	vs Baylor	Norman, OK (Oklahoma Invitational)	W 8–0	15–2
Mar 17	at Oklahoma	Norman, OK (Oklahoma Invitational)	W 1–0	16–2
Mar 17	vs Oklahoma State	Norman, OK (Oklahoma Invitational)	W 1–0^{13}	17–2
Mar 20	Texas–Arlington	College Station, TX	W 3–2	18–2
Mar 20	Texas–Arlington	College Station, TX	W 4–1	19–2
Mar 23	vs Minnesota	Lions Field • Fullerton, CA (PONY Invitational)	W 1–0	20–2
Mar 23	vs Cal Poly Pomona	Lions Field • Fullerton, CA (PONY Invitational)	L 0–4	20–3
Mar 24	vs Utah	Lions Field • Fullerton, CA (PONY Invitational)	L 1–2^{8}	20–4
Mar 28	Michigan	College Station, TX	W 2–0	21–4
Mar 28	Michigan	College Station, TX	L 4–5	21–5
Mar 29	Nebraska	College Station, TX	W 5–0	22–5
Mar 29	Nebraska	College Station, TX	W 1–0	23–5
Mar 30	vs Nebraska	Waco, TX (Baylor Invitational)	W 3–2	24–5
Mar 30	vs Stephen F. Austin	Waco, TX (Baylor Invitational)	L 1–3^{13}	24–6
Mar 30	vs Sam Houston State	Waco, TX (Baylor Invitational)	W 7–2	25–6
Mar 31	vs Stephen F. Austin	Waco, TX (Baylor Invitational)	W 1–0^{8}	26–6
Mar 31	vs Nebraska	Waco, TX (Baylor Invitational)	W 8–3	27–6
Mar 31	at Baylor	Waco, TX (Baylor Invitational)	W 4–2	28–6

April
Date	Opponent	Site/stadium	Score	Overall record
Apr 5	Cal State Fullerton	College Station, TX	L 1–3	28–7
Apr 6	Baylor	College Station, TX (Aggie Invitational)	W 4–2	29–7
Apr 6	Sam Houston State	College Station, TX (Aggie Invitational)	L 0–3	29–8
Apr 7	McNeese State	College Station, TX (Aggie Invitational)	W 5–0	30–8
Apr 7	Texas Tech	College Station, TX (Aggie Invitational)	L 0–1	30–9
Apr 8	Louisiana Tech	College Station, TX (Aggie Invitational)	W 3–1^{8}	31–9
Apr 8	Cal State Fullerton	College Station, TX (Aggie Invitational)	W 4–0	32–9
Apr 10	at Baylor	Waco, TX	W 6–1	33–9
Apr 10	at Baylor	Waco, TX	L 1–4	33–10
Apr 13	vs Utah	Lady Techster Softball Complex • Ruston, LA (Louisiana Tech Invitational)	W 1–0	34–10
Apr 13	vs South Carolina	Lady Techster Softball Complex • Ruston, LA (Louisiana Tech Invitational)	W 9–0	35–10
Apr 14	vs Nicholls State	Lady Techster Softball Complex • Ruston, LA (Louisiana Tech Invitational)	L 0–1	35–11
Apr 14	at Louisiana Tech	Lady Techster Softball Complex • Ruston, LA (Louisiana Tech Invitational)	L 0–1^{12}	35–12
Apr 16	McNeese State	College Station, TX	W 9–0	36–12
Apr 16	McNeese State	College Station, TX	W 2–0	37–12
Apr 19	at McNeese State	Lake Charles, LA	L 0–1^{9}	37–13
Apr 19	at McNeese State	Lake Charles, LA	W 5–2	38–13
Apr 27	vs US International	Salt Lake City, UT (Utah Tournament)	W 3–1	39–13
Apr 27	vs Nevada	Salt Lake City, UT (Utah Tournament)	W 10–2	40–13
Apr 27	vs BYU	Salt Lake City, UT (Utah Tournament)	W 5–4	41–13
Apr 28	at Utah	Salt Lake City, UT (Utah Tournament)	L 2–4	41–14
Apr 28	vs Utah State	Salt Lake City, UT (Utah Tournament)	W 8–1	42–14

May
Date	Opponent	Site/stadium	Score	Overall record
May 2	at Sam Houston State	Huntsville, TX	W 5–0	43–14
May 2	at Sam Houston State	Huntsville, TX	L 2–3	43–15
May 12	at Louisiana Tech	Lady Techster Softball Complex • Ruston, LA	W 1–0	44–15
May 12	at Louisiana Tech	Lady Techster Softball Complex • Ruston, LA	W 1–0	45–15

Postseason

NCAA At-large Regional
Date	Opponent	Site/stadium	Score	Overall record	NCAAT record
May 17	at Cal State Fullerton	Lions Field • Fullerton, CA	L 0–5	45–16	0–1
May 18	at Cal State Fullerton	Lions Field • Fullerton, CA	W 2–1^{15}	46–16	1–1
May 18	at Cal State Fullerton	Lions Field • Fullerton, CA	W 5–2	47–16	2–1

NCAA Women's College World Series
Date	Opponent	Site/stadium	Score	Overall record	WCWS Record
May 24	Cal Poly Pomona	Seymour Smith Park • Omaha, NE	W 1–0^{25}	48–16	1–0
May 26	Nebraska	Seymour Smith Park • Omaha, NE	W 5–2	49–16	2–0
May 28	UCLA	Seymour Smith Park • Omaha, NE	W 2–0	50–16	3–0
May 28	Northwestern	Seymour Smith Park • Omaha, NE	W 1–0^{14}	51–16	4–0
May 29	UCLA	Seymour Smith Park • Omaha, NE	L 0–1	51–17	4–1
May 29	UCLA	Seymour Smith Park • Omaha, NE	L 0–1	51–18	4–2
