= 1985 UCLA Bruins softball team =

American college softball season

1985 UCLA Bruins softball

National Champion NCAA At-large Regional champion
- Conference: Western Collegiate Athletic Association
- Record: 41–9 (9–3 WCAA)
- Head coach: Sharron Backus (11th season)
- Home stadium: Sunset Field

1985 Western Collegiate Athletic Association softball standings
	Conf.				Overall
Team	W		L	PCT	W		L	PCT
Cal State Fullerton ‍†‍‍^{y}	12	–	0	1.000	54	–	10	.844
UCLA ‍‍‍^{y}	9	–	3	.750	41	–	9	.820
Arizona State ‍‍‍^{y}	6	–	6	.500	38	–	17	.691
Long Beach State ‍‍‍	6	–	6	.500	25	–	19	.568
Arizona ‍‍‍	5	–	7	.417	17	–	16	.515
San Diego State ‍‍‍	4	–	8	.333	37	–	38	.493
Stanford ‍‍‍	0	–	12	.000	10	–	51	.164
† – Conference champion y – Invited to the NCAA tournament

The 1985 UCLA Bruins softball team represented the University of California, Los Angeles in the 1985 NCAA Division I softball season. The Bruins were coached by Sharron Backus, who led her eleventh season. The Bruins played their home games at Sunset Field and finished with a record of 41–9. They competed in the Western Collegiate Athletic Association, where they finished second with a 9–3 record.

The Bruins were invited to the 1985 NCAA Division I softball tournament, where they won the At-large Regional and then completed a run through the Women's College World Series to claim their third NCAA Women's College World Series Championship. The Bruins had earlier claimed an AIAW title in 1978, the first NCAA event in 1982 and the 1984 NCAA title.

== Personnel ==
=== Roster ===
1985 UCLA Bruins roster
Pitchers: 3 – Tracy Compton – senior; 7 – Tricia Mang – sophomore; 17 - Debbie Doom – senior; Catchers: 5 – Kaelyn Silva – sophomore; 18 – Shauna Wattenberg – sophomore; 19 – Janet Pinneau – junior	Infielders: 1 – Gina Holmstrom – sophomore; 4 – Jennifer Simm – senior; 12 – Leslie Rover – senior; 21 – Chris Olivie – junior; 24 – Lisa Hankerd – freshman	Outfielders: 10 – Mary Ricks – junior; 11 – Debbie Ruelas – sophomore; 13 – Stacy Winsberg – senior; 32 – Julie Henderson – freshman

=== Coaches ===
1985 UCLA Bruins softball coaching staff
- Sharron Backus - 11th season
- Sue Enquist - 6th season
- Kirk Walker - 2nd season

== Schedule ==
Legend
	UCLA win
	UCLA loss
	Tie
*	Non-Conference game

1985 UCLA Bruins softball game log
Regular season

February
Date	Opponent	Site/stadium	Score	Overall record	WCAA Record
Feb 12	Chapman*	Sunset Field • Los Angeles, CA	W 3–0	1–0	
Feb 12	Chapman*	Sunset Field • Los Angeles, CA	W 2–0	2–0	
Feb 15	Cal Poly*	Sunset Field • Los Angeles, CA	W 2–0	3–0	
Feb 15	Cal Poly*	Sunset Field • Los Angeles, CA	W 4–0	4–0	
Feb 19	Cal State Dominguez Hills*	Sunset Field • Los Angeles, CA	W 1–0	5–0	
Feb 19	CS Dominguez Hills*	Sunset Field • Los Angeles, CA	W 1–0	6–0	
Feb 23	at Cal State Northridge*	Northridge, CA	W 1–0^{8}	7–0	
Feb 23	at Cal State Northridge*	Northridge, CA	W 7–1	8–0	

March
Date	Opponent	Site/stadium	Score	Overall record	WCAA Record
Mar 10	UNLV*	Sunset Field • Los Angeles, CA	W 2–0	9–0	
Mar 24	Oregon State*	Sunset Field • Los Angeles, CA	W 3–0	10–0	
Mar 24	Oregon State*	Sunset Field • Los Angeles, CA	W 3–0	11–0	
Mar 29	at Hawaii*	Wahine Softball Stadium • Honolulu, HI (Hawaii Tournament)	L 0–1	11–1	
Mar 30	vs Oregon*	Wahine Softball Stadium • Honolulu, HI (Hawaii Tournament)	W 1–0^{9}	12–1	
Mar 31	vs Pacific*	Wahine Softball Stadium • Honolulu, HI (Hawaii Tournament)	W 7–2	13–1	
Mar 31	vs UC Barbara*	Wahine Softball Stadium • Honolulu, HI (Hawaii Tournament)	W 4–0^{6}	14–1	

April
Date	Opponent	Site/stadium	Score	Overall record	WCAA Record
Apr 3	at Stanford	Stanford, CA	W 6–0	15–1	1–0
Apr 3	at Stanford	Stanford, CA	W 6–0	16–1	2–0
Apr 5	vs Oregon State*	Hearst Field • Berkeley, CA (Cal Invitational)	W 1–0	17–1	
Apr 6	vs San Francisco*	Hearst Field • Berkeley, CA (Cal Invitational)	W 3–1	18–1	
Apr 7	at California*	Hearst Field • Berkeley, CA (Cal Invitational)	W 2–1^{8}	19–1	
Apr 7	vs Oregon State*	Hearst Field • Berkeley, CA (Cal Invitational)	W 2–0	20–1	
Apr 9	Long Beach State	Sunset Field • Los Angeles, CA	W 1–0	21–1	3–0
Apr 9	Long Beach State	Sunset Field • Los Angeles, CA	W 2–0	22–1	4–0
Apr 13	at Cal Poly Pomona*	Pomona, CA	L 0–1^{8}	22–2	
Apr 13	at Cal Poly Pomona*	Pomona, CA	L 0–1	22–3	
Apr 23	San Diego State	Sunset Field • Los Angeles, CA	W 1–0	23–3	5–0
Apr 23	San Diego State	Sunset Field • Los Angeles, CA	W 3–0	24–3	6–0
Apr 26	vs UC Santa Barbara*	Santa Maria, CA	W 2–0	25–3	
Apr 26	vs UC Santa Barbara*	Santa Maria, CA	W 6–0	26–3	
Apr 27	at UC Santa Barbara*	Santa Barbara, CA	W 6–0	27–3	
Apr 27	at UC Santa Barbara*	Santa Barbara, CA	W 3–0	28–3	
Apr 29	at US International*	San Diego, CA	W 1–0^{8}	29–3	
Apr 29	at US International*	San Diego, CA	W 3–0	30–3	

May
Date	Opponent	Site/stadium	Score	Overall record	WCAA Record
May 3	at Arizona State	Tempe, AZ	L 1–3	30–4	6–1
May 3	at Arizona State	Tempe, AZ	W 1–0	31–4	7–1
May 4	at Arizona	Tucson, AZ	W 3–0	32–4	8–1
May 4	at Arizona	Tucson, AZ	W 1–0	33–4	9–1
May 7	Cal Poly Pomona*	Sunset Field • Los Angeles, CA	W 1–0	34–4	
May 7	Cal Poly Pomona*	Sunset Field • Los Angeles, CA	L 0–1^{8}	34–5	
May 11	at Cal State Fullerton	Lions Field • Fullerton, CA	L 1–2	34–6	9–2
May 11	at Cal State Fullerton	Lions Field • Fullerton, CA	L 0–1	34–7	9–3

Postseason

NCAA West Regional
Date	Opponent	Site/stadium	Score	Overall record	NCAAT record
May 16	Pacific	Santa Maria, CA	L 1–3	34–8	0–1
May 17	Pacific	Santa Maria, CA	W 3–0	35–8	1–1
May 17	Pacific	Santa Maria, CA	W 2–0	36–8	2–1

NCAA Women's College World Series
Date	Opponent	Site/stadium	Score	Overall record	WCWS Record
May 22	Utah	Seymour Smith Park • Omaha, NE	W 1–0	37–8	1–0
May 24	Cal State Fullerton	Seymour Smith Park • Omaha, NE	L 0–2	37–9	1–1
May 25	Northwestern	Seymour Smith Park • Omaha, NE	W 1–0	38–9	2–1
May 25	Nebraska	Seymour Smith Park • Omaha, NE	W 3–0	39–9	3–1
May 26	Cal State Fullerton	Seymour Smith Park • Omaha, NE	W 1–0	40–9	4–1
May 26	Nebraska	Seymour Smith Park • Omaha, NE	W 2–1^{9}	41–9	5–1
