= 1984 NCAA Division I softball tournament =

- Teams: 16
- Finals site: Seymour Smith Park; Omaha, NE
- Champions: UCLA (2nd NCAA (3rd overall) WCWS title)
- Runner-up: Texas A&M (2nd WCWS Appearance)
- Winning coach: Sharron Backus (2nd NCAA (3rd overall) WCWS title)

The 1984 NCAA Division I softball tournament was the third annual tournament to determine the national champion of NCAA women's collegiate softball for the 1984 NCAA Division I softball season. Held during May 1984, sixteen Division I college softball teams contested the NCAA tournament's first round. Featuring eight regionals with two teams each, the winner of each region, a total of eight teams, advanced to the 1984 Women's College World Series in Omaha, Nebraska. The 1984 Women's College World Series was the third NCAA-sponsored championship in the sport of college softball at the Division I level. The event was held in Omaha, Nebraska from May 23 through May 29 and marked the conclusion of the 1984 NCAA Division I softball season. UCLA won the championship by defeating Texas A&M 1–0 in the final game.

== Regionals ==
West Regional
–	UCLA	1	3	—
–	Arizona	0	0	—

- UCLA qualifies for WCWS, 2–0

Mideast Regional
–	Northwestern	1	1	3
–	Western Michigan	0	2	1

- Northwestern qualifies for WCWS, 2–1

South Regional
–	Cal Poly Pomona	1^{9}	12	—
–	Louisiana Tech	0	0	—

- Cal Poly Pomona qualifies for WCWS, 2–0

Central Regional
–	Utah State	6	4^{8}	—
–	Utah	2	3	—

- Utah State qualifies for WCWS, 2–0

Midwest Regional
–	Nebraska	3^{18}	2^{14}	—
–	Oklahoma State	2	1	—

- Nebraska qualifies for WCWS, 2–0

Northeast Regional
–	Adelphi	2	1^{14}	—
–	Rutgers	0	0	—

- Adelphi qualifies for WCWS, 2–0

Northwest Regional
–	Fresno State	1	3	—
–	Pacific	0	1	—

- Fresno State qualifies for WCWS, 2–0

At-large Regional
–	Cal State Fullerton	5	1	2
–	Texas A&M	0	2^{15}	5

- Texas A&M qualifies for WCWS, 2–1

== Women's College World Series ==
=== Participants ===
- Adelphi
- Cal Poly Pomona
- Fresno State
- Nebraska
- Northwestern
- Texas A&M
- UCLA
- Utah State

=== Game results ===
==== Bracket ====
Upper round 1
UCLA	6
Utah State	0
Northwestern	1
Adelphi	0
Texas A&M	1^{25}
Cal Poly Pomona	0
Nebraska	2
Fresno State	0

Upper round 2
UCLA	1^{9}
Northwestern	0
Texas A&M	5
Nebraska	2
Lower round 1
Utah State	0
Adelphi	1
Cal Poly Pomona	0
Fresno State	1

Upper final
UCLA	0
Texas A&M	2^{8}
Lower round 2
Nebraska	2
Adelphi	1
Northwestern	3
Fresno State	0

Semifinals
Texas A&M	1^{14}
Northwestern	0
UCLA	1^{8}
Nebraska	0

Final
Texas A&M	0	0
UCLA	1	1^{13}

==== Game log ====
Date	Game	Winning team	Score	Losing team	Notes
May 23	Game 1	UCLA	6–0	Utah State	
May 23	Game 2	Northwestern	1–0	Adelphi	
May 24	Game 3	Texas A&M	1–0^{25}	Cal Poly Pomona	
May 25	Game 4	Nebraska	2–0	Fresno State	
May 25	Game 5	Adelphi	1–0	Utah State	Utah State eliminated
May 26	Game 6	Fresno State	1–0^{12}	Cal Poly Pomona	Cal Poly Pomona eliminated
May 26	Game 7	UCLA	1–0^{9}	Northwestern	
May 26	Game 8	Nebraska	5–2	Texas A&M	
May 27	Game 9	Northwestern	3–0^{8}	Fresno State	Fresno State eliminated
May 27	Game 10	Nebraska	2–1	Adelphi	Adelphi eliminated
May 28	Game 11	Texas A&M	2–0^{8}	UCLA	
May 28	Game 12	UCLA	1–0^{8}	Nebraska	Nebraska eliminated
May 28	Game 13	Texas A&M	1–0^{13}	Northwestern	Northwestern eliminated
May 29	Game 14	UCLA	1–0	Texas A&M	
May 29	Game 15	UCLA	1–0^{14}	Texas A&M	UCLA wins WCWS

=== Championship Game ===
School	Top Batter	Stats.
UCLA Bruins	Tricia Ming (DP)	2-6 RBI HR
Texas A&M Aggies	Pattie Holthaus (2B)	1-4

School	Pitcher	IP	H	R	ER	BB	SO	AB	BF
UCLA Bruins	Debbie Doom (W)	13.0	5	0	0	1	15	44	47
Texas A&M Aggies	Yvette Lopez	2.0	2	0	0	0	1	8	9
Texas A&M Aggies	Shawn Andaya (L)	10.1	5	1	1	1	3	36	39

=== All-Tournament Team ===
The following players were named to the All-Tournament Team

Pos	Name	School
P	Shawn Andaya	Texas A&M
P	Debbie Doom	UCLA
P	Lisa Ishikawa	Northwestern
1B	Denice Feldhaus	Nebraska
2B	Jennifer Simm	UCLA
3B	Anne Schroeder	Nebraska
SS	Leslie Rover	UCLA
OF	Peg Richardson	Nebraska
OF	Regina Dooley	Adelphi
OF	Josie Carter	Texas A&M
C	Gay McNutt	Texas A&M
DH	Tricia Mang	UCLA

== See also ==
- 1984 NCAA Division II softball tournament
- 1984 NCAA Division III softball tournament
- 1984 NAIA softball tournament
- 1984 NCAA Division I baseball tournament
