= 1983 Cal State Fullerton Titans softball team =

American college softball season

1983 Cal State Fullerton Titans softball

NCAA West Regional champion WCAA champion

Women's College World Series, runner-up
- Conference: Western Collegiate Athletic Association
- Record: 56–15 (17–3 WCAA)
- Head coach: Judi Garman (4th season)

1983 Western Collegiate Athletic Association softball standings
	Conf.						Overall
Team	W		L		T	PCT	W		L		T	PCT
Cal State Fullerton ‍†‍‍^{y}	17	–	3	–	0	.850	56	–	15	–	0	.789
UCLA ‍†‍‍^{y}	17	–	3	–	0	.850	40	–	7	–	0	.851
Arizona State ‍‍‍	9	–	12	–	1	.432	22	–	19	–	1	.536
Arizona ‍‍‍	7	–	12	–	0	.368	20	–	24	–	0	.455
San Diego State ‍‍‍	5	–	15	–	0	.250	18	–	21	–	1	.463
Long Beach State ‍‍‍	4	–	14	–	1	.237	15	–	32	–	2	.327
† – Conference champion y – Invited to the NCAA tournament

The 1983 Cal State Fullerton Titans softball team represented California State University, Fullerton in the 1983 NCAA Division I softball season. The Titans were coached by Judi Garman, who led her fourth season. The Titans finished with a record of 56–15.

The Titans were invited to the 1983 NCAA Division I softball tournament, where they swept the NCAA West Regional and then completed a run to the title game of the Women's College World Series where they fell to champion Texas A&M.

== Roster ==
1983 Cal State Fullerton Titans roster
Pitchers: 4 - Lisa Baker; 32 - Susan LeFebvre; Catchers: 13 - Leslie King; 25 - Maridee Richards	Infielders: 7 - Sue Lewis; 15 - Robin Goodin; 21 - Joanne Ferrieri; Outfielders: 2 - Vera Bahr; 20 - Elise King	3 - Kim Kirk; 6 - Stephanie Tanaka; 8 - Pam Newton; 10 - Lori Neff; 11 - Tobi Perkins; 19 - Jan Pierini

== Schedule ==
Legend
	Cal State Fullerton win
	Cal State Fullerton loss
*	Non-Conference game

1983 Cal State Fullerton Titans softball game log
Regular season

February
Date	Opponent	Site/stadium	Score	Overall record	WCAA record
Feb 12	at Cal State Dominguez Hills*	Carson, CA	W 1–0	1–0	
Feb 12	at Cal State Dominguez Hills*	Carson, CA	W 2–0	2–0	
Feb 17	at UC Santa Barbara*	Santa Barbara, CA	W 2–0	3–0	
Feb 17	at UC Santa Barbara*	Santa Barbara, CA	L 1–2	3–1	
Feb 22	Michigan*	Lions Field • Fullerton, CA	W 2–0	4–1	
Feb 22	Michigan*	Lions Field • Fullerton, CA	W 9–0	5–1	
Feb 24	Chapman*	Lions Field • Fullerton, CA	W 2–0	6–1	
Feb 24	Chapman*	Lions Field • Fullerton, CA	W 5–0	7–1	
Feb 25	US International*	Lions Field • Fullerton, CA	L 0–1	7–2	
Feb 25	US International*	Lions Field • Fullerton, CA	W 2–0	8–2	

March
Date	Opponent	Site/stadium	Score	Overall record	WCAA record
Mar 8	Creighton*	Lions Field • Fullerton, CA	W 2–1	9–2	
Mar 8	Creighton*	Lions Field • Fullerton, CA	W 2–0	10–2	
Mar 9	Cal State Northridge*	Lions Field • Fullerton, CA	W 1–0^{18}	11–2	
Mar 9	Cal State Northridge*	Lions Field • Fullerton, CA	L 0–1	11–3	
Mar 11	Arizona State	Lions Field • Fullerton, CA	W 1–0	12–3	1–0
Mar 11	Arizona State	Lions Field • Fullerton, CA	W 2–0	13–3	2–0
Mar 12	Arizona	Lions Field • Fullerton, CA	W 3–2	14–3	3–0
Mar 12	Arizona	Lions Field • Fullerton, CA	W 6–2	15–3	4–0
Mar 16	at US International*	San Diego, CA	W 1–0^{9}	16–3	
Mar 16	at US International*	San Diego, CA	W 13–0	17–3	
Mar 19	Northern Colorado*	Lions Field • Fullerton, CA	W 10–0	18–3	
Mar 19	Northern Colorado*	Lions Field • Fullerton, CA	W 3–0	19–3	
Mar 20	Texas A&M*	Lions Field • Fullerton, CA	W 1–0	20–3	
Mar 20	Texas A&M*	Lions Field • Fullerton, CA	W 3–0	21–3	
Mar 23	Minnesota*	Lions Field • Fullerton, CA	W 8–0	22–3	
Mar 23	Minnesota*	Lions Field • Fullerton, CA	W 1–0^{10}	23–3	
Mar 25	New Mexico State*	Lions Field • Fullerton, CA (PONY Tournament)	W 1–0	24–3	
Mar 25	Utah State*	Lions Field • Fullerton, CA (PONY Tournament)	W 4–0	25–3	
Mar 26	Fresno State*	Lions Field • Fullerton, CA (PONY Tournament)	W 7–0	26–3	
Mar 26	Texas A&M*	Lions Field • Fullerton, CA (PONY Tournament)	L 0–2	26–4	
Mar 27	Cal Poly Pomona*	Lions Field • Fullerton, CA (PONY Tournament)	L 2–4	26–5	
Mar 30	at California*	Berkeley, CA	W 3–2	27–5	
Mar 30	at California*	Berkeley, CA	W 3–2	28–5	
Mar 31	at San Francisco*	San Francisco, CA	W 2–0	29–5	
Mar 31	at San Francisco*	San Francisco, CA	W 2–0	30–5	

April
Date	Opponent	Site/stadium	Score	Overall record	WCAA record
Apr 1	at Pacific*	Stockton, CA	L 0–1	30–6	
Apr 1	at Pacific*	Stockton, CA	W 7–0 (Note: Forfeit)	31–6	
Apr 5	at UCLA	Sunset Field • Los Angeles, CA	L 1–4	31–7	4–1
Apr 5	at UCLA	Sunset Field • Los Angeles, CA	W 5–0	32–7	5–1
Apr 8	Long Beach State	Lions Field • Fullerton, CA	W 5–0	33–7	6–1
Apr 8	Long Beach State	Lions Field • Fullerton, CA	W 4–0	34–7	7–1
Apr 9	at Cal Poly Pomona*	Pomona, CA	W 1–0	35–7	
Apr 9	at Cal Poly Pomona*	Pomona, CA	L 1–2	35–8	
Apr 13	San Diego State*	Lions Field • Fullerton, CA	W 2–1	36–8	8–1
Apr 13	San Diego State	Lions Field • Fullerton, CA	W 7–0 (Note: Forfeit)	37–8	9–1
Apr 15	vs Texas A&M*	Albuquerque, NM (UNM Diamond Invitational)	L 0–1	37–9	
Apr 15	vs Texas A&M*	Albuquerque, NM (UNM Diamond Invitational)	W 2–^{19}	38–9	
Apr 16	vs Oklahoma State*	Albuquerque, NM (UNM Diamond Invitational)	L 0–2	38–10	
Apr 16	vs Oklahoma State*	Albuquerque, NM (UNM Diamond Invitational)	W 5–3	39–10	
Apr 17	at New Mexico*	Albuquerque, NM (UNM Diamond Invitational)	W 5–1	40–10	
Apr 17	at New Mexico*	Albuquerque, NM (UNM Diamond Invitational)	W 4–3	41–10	
Apr 22	at Arizona	UA Softball Field • Tucson, AZ	W 1–0	42–10	10–1
Apr 22	at Arizona	UA Softball Field • Tucson, AZ	W 6–1	43–10	11–1
Apr 23	at Arizona State	Tempe, AZ	W 1–0^{9}	44–10	12–1
Apr 23	at Arizona State	Tempe, AZ	L 2–4	44–11	12–2
Apr 27	at San Diego State*	San Diego, CA	W 1–0^{10}	45–11	13–2
Apr 27	at San Diego State*	San Diego, CA	W 2–0	46–11	14–2

May
Date	Opponent	Site/stadium	Score	Overall record	WCAA record
May 3	UCLA	Lions Field • Fullerton, CA	W 1–0	47–11	15–2
May 3	UCLA	Lions Field • Fullerton, CA	L 0–1	47–12	15–3
May 6	at Long Beach State	Long Beach, CA	W 3–1	48–12	16–3
May 6	at Long Beach State	Long Beach, CA	W 5–0	49–12	17–3
May 8	Cal Poly Pomona*	Lions Field • Fullerton, CA	W 5–0	50–12	
May 8	Cal Poly Pomona*	Lions Field • Fullerton, CA	W 2–1^{20}	51–12	

Post-season

NCAA West Regional
Date	Opponent	Site/stadium	Score	Overall record	Reg record
May 13	New Mexico	Lions Field • Fullerton, CA	W 6–0	52–12	1–0
May 14	New Mexico	Lions Field • Fullerton, CA	L 0–4	52–13	1–1
May 14	New Mexico	Lions Field • Fullerton, CA	W 6–0	53–13	2–1

NCAA Women's College World Series
Date	Opponent	Site/stadium	Score	Overall record	WCWS Record
May 25	Indiana	Seymour Smith Park • Omaha, NE	W 3–2	54–13	1–0
May 27	South Carolina	Seymour Smith Park • Omaha, NE	W 2–0	55–13	2–0
May 28	UCLA	Seymour Smith Park • Omaha, NE	W 6–1	56–13	3–0
May 28	Texas A&M	Seymour Smith Park • Omaha, NE	L 0–1	56–14	3–1
May 29	Texas A&M	Seymour Smith Park • Omaha, NE	L 0–2^{12}	56–15	3–2
