= 1983 Texas A&M Aggies softball team =

American college softball season

1983 Texas A&M Aggies softball

National Champion NCAA Central Regional champion
- Conference: Independent
- Record: 41–11
- Head coach: Bob Brock (2nd season)

The 1983 Texas A&M Aggies softball team represented Texas A&M University in the 1983 NCAA Division I softball season. The Aggies were coached by Bob Brock, who led his second season at Texas A&M. The Aggies finished with a record of 41–11.

The Aggies were invited to the 1983 NCAA Division I softball tournament, where they swept the Central Regional and then completed a run through the Women's College World Series to claim the NCAA Women's College World Series Championship for the first time. Texas A&M had won the 1982 AIAW Women's College World Series the previous year, and did not participate in the 1982 NCAA Women's College World Series.

== Roster ==
1983 Texas A&M Aggies roster
Pitchers: Shan McDonald – senior; Lori Stoll – senior; Catchers: Gay McNutt – sophomore	Infielders: Carrie Austgen – senior; Cindy Cooper – freshman; Patti Holthaus – junior; Mary Schwind – freshman	Outfielders: Josie Carter – sophomore; Cindy Foster – freshman; Iva Jackson – sophomore

== Schedule ==
Legend
	Texas A&M win
	Texas A&M loss
*	Non-Conference game

1983 Texas A&M Aggies softball game log
Regular Season

March
Date	Opponent	Site/stadium	Score	Overall record
Mar 1	Evansville	College Station, TX	W 11–0	1–0
Mar 1	Evansville	College Station, TX	W 5–0	2–0
Mar 8	at Texas–Arlington	Arlington Athletic Center • Arlington, TX	L 0–1	2–1
Mar 8	at Texas–Arlington	Arlington Athletic Center • Arlington, TX	W 5–0	3–1
Mar 9	Louisiana Tech	College Station, TX	W 2–1^{10}	4–1
Mar 9	Louisiana Tech	College Station, TX	W 4–0	5–1
Mar 17	vs Ohio State	Norman, OK (Sooner Invitational)	W 5–0	6–1
Mar 18	vs Illinois State	Norman, OK (Sooner Invitational)	W 2–0	7–1
Mar 18	vs Missouri	Norman, OK (Sooner Invitational)	W 4–0	8–1
Mar 18	vs Oklahoma State	Norman, OK (Sooner Invitational)	L 0–2	8–2
Mar 20	at Cal State Fullerton	Lions Field • Fullerton, CA	L 0–1	8–3
Mar 20	at Cal State Fullerton	Lions Field • Fullerton, CA	L 0–3	8–4
Mar 23	at Cal Poly Pomona	Pomona, CA	W 1–0	9–4
Mar 23	at Cal Poly Pomona	Pomona, CA	W 1–0^{9}	10–4
Mar 25	vs Utah	Lions Field • Fullerton, CA (Pony Invitational)	W 2–0	11–4
Mar 25	vs Arizona	Lions Field • Fullerton, CA (Pony Invitational)	W 1–0^{12}	12–4
Mar 26	vs Cal Poly Pomona	Lions Field • Fullerton, CA (Pony Invitational)	W 1–0	13–4
Mar 26	vs Cal State Fullerton	Lions Field • Fullerton, CA (Pony Invitational)	W 2–0	14–4
Mar 27	vs Cal Poly Pomona	Lions Field • Fullerton, CA (Pony Invitational)	L 2–3^{10}	14–5
Mar 27	vs Cal Poly Pomona	Lions Field • Fullerton, CA (Pony Invitational)	L 0–3	14–6
Mar 29	Texas–Arlington	College Station, TX	W 1–0	15–6
Mar 29	Texas–Arlington	College Station, TX	W 7–4	16–6

April
Date	Opponent	Site/stadium	Score	Overall record
Apr 8	Baylor	College Station, TX (Aggie Invitational)	W 2–0	17–6
Apr 8	Weber State	College Station, TX (Aggie Invitational)	W 6–0	18–6
Apr 8	New Mexico	College Station, TX (Aggie Invitational)	W 3–0	19–6
Apr 9	McNeese State	College Station, TX (Aggie Invitational)	W 7–0	20–6
Apr 9	Sam Houston State	College Station, TX (Aggie Invitational)	W 3–1	21–6
Apr 10	Utah State	College Station, TX (Aggie Invitational)	W 2–0	22–6
Apr 13	at Sam Houston State	Huntsville, TX	W 2–0	23–6
Apr 13	at Sam Houston State	Huntsville, TX	W 2–0	24–6
Apr 14	at West Texas State	Canyon, TX	W 6–3	25–6
Apr 14	at West Texas State	Canyon, TX	W 7–6	26–6
Apr 15	vs Cal State Fullerton	Albuquerque, NM (Diamond Invitational)	W 1–0	27–6
Apr 15	vs Cal State Fullerton	Albuquerque, NM (Diamond Invitational)	L 1–2^{19}	27–7
Apr 16	at New Mexico	Albuquerque, NM (Diamond Invitational)	W 4–0	28–7
Apr 16	at New Mexico	Albuquerque, NM (Diamond Invitational)	L 0–2	28–8
Apr 17	vs Oklahoma State	Albuquerque, NM (Diamond Invitational)	W 3–1	29–8
Apr 17	vs Oklahoma State	Albuquerque, NM (Diamond Invitational)	W 2–0	30–8
Apr 22	vs Creighton	Lincoln, NE (Nebraska Invitational)	L 0–1	30–9
Apr 23	vs California	Lincoln, NE (Nebraska Invitational)	W 5–0	31–9
Apr 23	vs Nebraska	Lincoln, NE (Nebraska Invitational)	W 5–0	32–9
Apr 24	vs Creighton	Lincoln, NE (Nebraska Invitational)	W 1–0	33–9
Apr 29	at Louisiana Tech	Ruston, LA	L 0–1	33–10
Apr 29	at Louisiana Tech	Ruston, LA	W 2–1	34–10

Post-Season

NCAA Central Regional
Date	Opponent	Site/stadium	Score	Overall record	Reg. Record
May 13	Kansas	College Station, TX	W 5–0	35–10	1–0
May 14	Kansas	College Station, TX	W 1–0	36–10	2–0

NCAA Women's College World Series
Date	Opponent	Site/stadium	Score	Overall record	WCWS record
May 25	South Carolina	Seymour Smith Park • Omaha, NE	L 0–2	36–11	0–1
May 27	Indiana	Seymour Smith Park • Omaha, NE	W 1–0	37–11	1–1
May 28	Louisiana Tech	Seymour Smith Park • Omaha, NE	W 2–0	38–11	2–1
May 29	Cal State Fullerton	Seymour Smith Park • Omaha, NE	W 1–0	39–11	3–1
May 30	UCLA	Seymour Smith Park • Omaha, NE	W 1–0^{14}	40–11	4–1
May 30	Cal State Fullerton	Seymour Smith Park • Omaha, NE	W 2–0^{12}	41–11	5–1
