= 1983 NCAA Division I softball season =

American college softball season

- Defending Champions: UCLA

Tournament

Women's College World Series
- Champions: Texas A&M (1st NCAA WCWS title)
- Runners-up: Cal State Fullerton (2nd WCWS Appearance)
- Winning Coach: Bob Brock (1st NCAA WCWS title)

Seasons
- ← 1982 1984 →

The 1983 NCAA Division I softball season, play of college softball in the United States organized by the National Collegiate Athletic Association (NCAA) at the Division I level, began in February 1983. The season progressed through the regular season, many conference tournaments and championship series, and concluded with the 1983 NCAA Division I softball tournament and 1983 Women's College World Series. The Women's College World Series, consisting of the eight remaining teams in the NCAA Tournament and held in Omaha, Nebraska at Seymour Smith Park, ended on May 29, 1983.

== Conference standings ==
1983 Big Ten Conference softball standings
	Conf.						Overall
Team	W		L		T	PCT	W		L		T	PCT
Indiana ‍†‍‍^{y}	14	–	5	–	1	.725	45	–	20	–	1	.689
Northwestern ‍‍‍	13	–	7	–	0	.650	34	–	16	–	0	.680
Minnesota ‍‍‍	13	–	9	–	0	.591	32	–	18	–	0	.640
Iowa ‍‍‍	8	–	7	–	0	.533	20	–	18	–	0	.526
Michigan State ‍‍‍	9	–	11	–	0	.450	16	–	22	–	1	.423
Michigan ‍‍‍	9	–	15	–	0	.375	32	–	27	–	0	.542
Ohio State ‍‍‍	4	–	14	–	1	.237	19	–	28	–	1	.406
† – Conference champion y – Invited to the NCAA tournament

1983 Southland Conference softball standings
	Conf.						Overall
Team	W		L		T	PCT	W		L		T	PCT
North Zone
Texas–Arlington ^{x}‍‍‍	5	–	1	–	0	.833	39	–	19	–	0	.672
Northeast Louisiana ‍‍‍	3	–	1	–	0	.750	9	–	18	–	0	.333
Arkansas State ‍‍‍	0	–	6	–	0	.000	5	–	9	–	0	.357
South Zone
Southwestern Louisiana ^{x}‍‍‍	6	–	2	–	0	.750	22	–	13	–	0	.629
McNeese State ‍‍‡‍	5	–	3	–	0	.625	19	–	18	–	0	.514
Lamar ‍‍‍	1	–	7	–	0	.125	5	–	40	–	0	.111
x – Division champion ‡ – Tournament champion

1983 Western Collegiate Athletic Association softball standings
	Conf.						Overall
Team	W		L		T	PCT	W		L		T	PCT
Cal State Fullerton ‍†‍‍^{y}	17	–	3	–	0	.850	56	–	15	–	0	.789
UCLA ‍†‍‍^{y}	17	–	3	–	0	.850	40	–	7	–	0	.851
Arizona State ‍‍‍	9	–	12	–	1	.432	22	–	19	–	1	.536
Arizona ‍‍‍	7	–	12	–	0	.368	20	–	24	–	0	.455
San Diego State ‍‍‍	5	–	15	–	0	.250	18	–	21	–	1	.463
Long Beach State ‍‍‍	4	–	14	–	1	.237	15	–	32	–	2	.327
† – Conference champion y – Invited to the NCAA tournament

== Women's College World Series ==
The 1983 NCAA Women's College World Series took place from May 25 to May 29, 1983 in Omaha, Nebraska.

Upper round 1
Cal State Fullerton	3
Indiana	2
South Carolina	2
Texas A&M	0
UCLA	1
Missouri	0
Louisiana Tech	7
Pacific	0

Upper round 2
Cal State Fullerton	2
South Carolina	0
UCLA	8
Louisiana Tech	0
Lower round 1
Indiana	0
Texas A&M	1
Missouri	0
Pacific	1^{12}

Upper final
Cal State Fullerton	6
UCLA	1
Lower round 2
Louisiana Tech	0
Texas A&M	2
South Carolina	2
Pacific	1

Semifinals
Cal State Fullerton	0
Texas A&M	1
UCLA	2^{17}
South Carolina	1

Preliminary final
Texas A&M	1^{14}
UCLA	0

Final
Cal State Fullerton	0
Texas A&M	2^{12}

== Season leaders ==
Batting

- Batting average: .516 – Mitzi Davis, East Carolina Pirates
- RBIs: 46 – Mitzi Davis, East Carolina Pirates
- Home runs: 9 – Cindy Mosteller, Baylor Lady Bears

Pitching

- Wins: 30-7 – Lori Stoll, Texas A&M Aggies
- ERA: 0.04 (1 ER/168.0 IP) – Tracy Compton, UCLA Bruins
- Strikeouts: 340 – Lori Stoll, Texas A&M Aggies

== Records ==
NCAA Division I season ERA: 0.04 (1 ER/168.0 IP) – Tracy Compton, UCLA Bruins

NCAA Division I single game assists: 12 – Wende Ward, Fresno State Bulldogs; February 23, 1983

Freshman class ERA: 0.09 (3 ER/219.0 IP) – Darlene Lowery, South Carolina Gamecocks

== Awards ==
- Honda Sports Award Softball:

Lori Stoll, Texas A&M Aggies

YEAR	W	L	GP	GS	CG	SHO	SV	IP	H	R	ER	BB	SO	ERA	WHIP
1983	30	7	45	35	34	24	3	297.1	99	26	14	60	340	0.33	0.53
