= 1985 Nebraska Cornhuskers softball team =

American college softball season

1985 Nebraska Cornhuskers softball

NCAA Midwest Regional champion Big 8 tournament champion Big 8 champion

Women's College World Series, runner-up
- Conference: Big Eight Conference
- Record: 38–11 (11–1 Big 8)
- Head coach: Wayne Daigle (2nd season)
- Home stadium: NU Softball Complex

1985 Big Eight Conference softball standings
	Conf.				Overall
Team	W		L	PCT	W		L	PCT
Nebraska ‍†‍‡‍^{y}	38	–	11	.776	11	–	1	.917
Kansas ‍‍‍^{y}	38	–	17	.691	7	–	5	.583
Missouri ‍‍‍	29	–	23	.558	6	–	6	.500
Iowa State ‍‍‍	35	–	19	.648	6	–	6	.500
Oklahoma State ‍‍‍	30	–	15	.667	6	–	6	.500
Oklahoma ‍‍‍	24	–	18	.571	5	–	7	.417
Kansas State ‍‍‍		–		–	1	–	11	.083
† – Conference champion ‡ – Tournament champion y – Invited to the NCAA tournament

The 1985 Nebraska Cornhuskers softball team represented the University of Nebraska–Lincoln in the 1985 NCAA Division I softball season. The Cornhuskers were coached by Wayne Daigle, who led his second season. The Huskers finished with a record of 38–11. They competed in the Big Eight Conference, where they finished first with an 11–1 record. They also won the 1985 Big Eight Conference softball tournament.

The Cornhuskers were invited to the 1985 NCAA Division I softball tournament, where they swept the NCAA Midwest Regional and then completed a run to the title game of the Women's College World Series where they fell to champion UCLA.

The Huskers WCWS finish was vacated due to NCAA sanctions over player ineligibility. Nebraska was also ineligible for postseason play in 1986. Coach Daigle resigned after the 1986 season.

== Roster ==
1985 Nebraska Cornhuskers roster
Pitchers: 15 - Mori Emmons - Senior; 16 - Lori Sippel - Freshman; 17 - Donna Deardorff - Freshman; Catchers: 13 - Lisa Busby - Senior	Infielders: 2 - Shelby Mertins - Junior; 3 - Amy Love - Sophomore; 5 - Lori Richins - Sophomore; 10 - Denise Day - Senior; 12 - Ann Schroeder - Senior; Utility: 7 - Barbara Sterns - Freshman	Outfielders: 1 - Leeanna Miles - Freshman; 4 - Stacy Sunny - Sophomore; 6 - Wendy Turner - Senior; 8 - Paula Brown - Freshman; 9 - Peg Richardson - Senior; 11 - Heidi Schlabach - Junior; 14 - Debbie Ellison - Senior; 18 - Ginger Cannon - Sophomore

== Schedule ==
Legend
	Nebraska win
	Nebraska loss
*	Non-Conference game

1985 Nebraska Cornhuskers softball game log
Regular season

Date	Opponent	Site/stadium	Score	Overall record	Big 8 Record
	Wichita State*	NU Softball Complex • Lincoln, NE	W 8–0^{6}	1–0	
	Illinois State*	NU Softball Complex • Lincoln, NE	W 7–0	2–0	
	Texas Tech*	NU Softball Complex • Lincoln, NE	W 4–0	3–0	
	Arizona State*	NU Softball Complex • Lincoln, NE	W 2–1	4–0	
	Missouri*		L 1–3	4–1	
	at Cal State Fullerton*	Anderson Family Field • Fullerton, CA	L 0–2	4–2	
	Utah*		L 0–3	4–3	
	at Cal State Northridge*	Northridge, CA	W 3–0	5–3	
	at Cal State Northridge*	Northridge, CA	L 0–1^{8}	5–4	
	San Diego State*		W 1–0	6–4	
	Fresno State*		W 2–0^{9}	7–4	
	at Cal State Fullerton*	Anderson Family Field • Fullerton, CA	L 0–6	7–5	
	Pacific*		L 0–1	7–6	
	at Chapman*	Orange, CA	W 6–1	8–6	
	at Chapman*	Orange, CA	W 5–0	9–6	
	UNLV*		W 4–3	10–6	
	UC Riverside*		W 12–0	11–6	
	UNLV		W 6–1	12–6	
	Creighton*	NU Softball Complex • Lincoln, NE	W 3–0	13–6	
	Creighton*	NU Softball Complex • Lincoln, NE	W 6–1	14–6	
Apr 6	at Kansas	Lawrence, KS	L 0–1	14–7	0–1
Apr 6	vs Kansas State	Lawrence, KS	W 8–0^{5}	15–7	1–1
Apr 7	vs Kansas	Manhattan, KS	W 4–2^{9}	16–7	2–1
Apr 7	at Kansas State	Manhattan, KS	W 1–0	17–7	3–1
	Colorado State*	NU Softball Complex • Lincoln, NE	W 10–0	18–7	
	Colorado State*	NU Softball Complex • Lincoln, NE	W 3–0	19–7	
	Oklahoma State	NU Softball Complex • Lincoln, NE	W 3–0	20–7	4–1
	Missouri	NU Softball Complex • Lincoln, NE	W 5–2	21–7	5–1
	Oklahoma State	NU Softball Complex • Lincoln, NE	W 1–0^{8}	22–7	6–1
	Missouri	NU Softball Complex • Lincoln, NE	W 5–2	23–7	7–1
	at Creighton	Omaha, NE	W 7–0	24–7	
	at Creighton	Omaha, NE	L 3–5	24–8	
Apr 20	vs Oklahoma	Ames, IA	W 2–1^{9}	25–8	8–1
Apr 20	at Iowa State	Ames, IA	W 4–3	26–8	9–1
Apr 21	vs Oklahoma	Ames, IA	W 8–4	27–8	10–1
Apr 21	at Iowa State	Ames, IA	W 4–0	28–8	11–1
	Kearney State*	NU Softball Complex • Lincoln, NE	W 1–0	29–8	
	Kearney State*	NU Softball Complex • Lincoln, NE	W 8–0	30–8	

Postseason

Big Eight Tournament
Date	Opponent	Site/stadium	Score	Overall record	Big 8 T record
May 4	Missouri	Reaves Park • Norman, OK	W 6–1	31–8	1–0
May 5	Kansas	Reaves Park • Norman, OK	W 3–0	32–8	2–0
May 6	Kansas	Reaves Park • Norman, OK	W 4–2	33–8	3–0

NCAA Midwest Regional
Date	Opponent	Site/stadium	Score	Overall record	NCAAT record
May 16	Kansas	NU Softball Complex • Lincoln, NE	L 1–4	33–9	0–1
May 17	Kansas	NU Softball Complex • Lincoln, NE	W 6–1	34–9	1–1
May 17	Kansas	NU Softball Complex • Lincoln, NE	W 2–0	35–9	2–1

NCAA Women's College World Series
Date	Opponent	Site/stadium	Score	Overall record	WCWS Record
May 23	Louisiana Tech	Seymour Smith Park • Omaha, NE	W 6–0	36–9	1–0
May 24	Cal Poly Pomona	Seymour Smith Park • Omaha, NE	W 2–0	37–9	2–0
May 25	Cal State Fullerton	Seymour Smith Park • Omaha, NE	W 5–1	38–9	3–0
May 26	UCLA	Seymour Smith Park • Omaha, NE	L 0–3	38–10	3–1
May 26	UCLA	Seymour Smith Park • Omaha, NE	L 1–2^{9}	38–11	3–2
