= 1983 NCAA Division I softball tournament =

- Teams: 16
- Finals site: Seymour Smith Park; Omaha, NE
- Champions: Texas A&M (1st NCAA (2nd overall) WCWS title)
- Runner-up: Cal State Fullerton (2nd WCWS Appearance)
- Winning coach: Bob Brock (1st NCAA (2nd overall) WCWS title)
- Attendance: 16174

The 1983 NCAA Division I softball tournament were held in May at the end of the 1983 NCAA Division I softball season. Sixteen Division I college softball teams competed in the NCAA tournament's first round, which consisted of eight regionals with two teams each. The winner of each region, a total of eight teams, advanced to the 1983 Women's College World Series in Omaha, Nebraska. The 1983 Women's College World Series was the second NCAA-sponsored championship in the sport of college softball at the Division I level. The event was held in Omaha, Nebraska from May 25 through May 29 and marked the conclusion of the 1983 NCAA Division I softball season. Texas A&M, following up its 1982 AIAW WCWS title, won the championship by defeating Cal State Fullerton 2–1 in the final game.

== Regionals ==
West Regional
–	Cal State Fullerton	6	0	6
–	New Mexico	0	4	0

- Cal State Fullerton qualifies for WCWS, 2–1

Mideast Regional
–	Indiana	3	0	6
–	Cal Poly Pomona	2	1	1

- Indiana qualifies for WCWS, 2–1

South Regional
–	South Carolina	1^{10}	3	3
–	Central Michigan	0	4^{8}	0

- South Carolina qualifies for WCWS, 2–1

Central Regional
–	Texas A&M	5	1	—
–	Kansas	0	0	—

- Texas A&M qualifies for WCWS, 2–0

Midwest Regional
–	Missouri	1	3	1
–	Southwest Missouri State	3	0	0

- Missouri qualifies for WCWS, 2–1

Northeast Regional
–	UCLA	1^{9}	1^{11}	—
–	Rhode Island	0	0	—

- UCLA qualifies for WCWS, 2–0

Northwest Regional
–	Pacific	3	0	3^{12}
–	Fresno State	1	2	0

- Pacific qualifies for WCWS, 2–1

Atlantic Regional
–	Louisiana Tech	2	9	—
–	Penn State	0	1	—

- Louisiana Tech qualifies for WCWS, 2–0

== Women's College World Series ==
=== Participants ===
- Cal State Fullerton
- Indiana
- South Carolina
- Texas A&M
- UCLA
- Missouri
- Louisiana Tech
- Pacific

=== Game results ===
==== Bracket ====
Upper round 1
Cal State Fullerton	3
Indiana	2
South Carolina	2
Texas A&M	0
UCLA	1
Missouri	0
Louisiana Tech	7
Pacific	0

Upper round 2
Cal State Fullerton	2
South Carolina	0
UCLA	8
Louisiana Tech	0
Lower round 1
Indiana	0
Texas A&M	1
Missouri	0
Pacific	1^{12}

Upper final
Cal State Fullerton	6
UCLA	1
Lower round 2
Louisiana Tech	0
Texas A&M	2
South Carolina	2
Pacific	1

Semifinals
Cal State Fullerton	0
Texas A&M	1
UCLA	2^{17}
South Carolina	1

Preliminary final
Texas A&M	1^{14}
UCLA	0

Final
Cal State Fullerton	0
Texas A&M	2^{12}

==== Game log ====
Date	Game	Winning team	Score	Losing team	Notes
May 25	Game 1	Cal State Fullerton	3–2	Indiana	
May 25	Game 2	South Carolina	2–0	Texas A&M	
May 26	Game 3	UCLA	1–0	Missouri	
May 26	Game 4	Louisiana Tech	7–0	Pacific	
May 27	Game 5	Texas A&M	1–0	Indiana	Indiana eliminated
May 27	Game 6	Pacific	1–0^{12}	Missouri	Missouri eliminated
May 27	Game 7	Cal State Fullerton	2–0	South Carolina	
May 27	Game 8	UCLA	8–0	Louisiana Tech	
May 28	Game 9	South Carolina	2–1	Pacific	Pacific eliminated
May 28	Game 10	Texas A&M	2–0	Louisiana Tech	Louisiana Tech eliminated
May 28	Game 11	Cal State Fullerton	6–1	UCLA	
May 28	Game 12	UCLA	2–1^{17}	South Carolina	South Carolina eliminated
May 28	Game 13	Texas A&M	1–0	Cal State Fullerton	
May 29	Game 14	Texas A&M	1–0^{17}	UCLA	
May 29	Game 15	Texas A&M	^{12}	Cal State Fullerton	Texas A&M wins WCWS

=== Championship Game ===
School	Top Batter	Stats.
Texas A&M Aggies	Pattie Holthaus (2B)	1-4 BB K
Cal State Fullerton Titans	JoAnn Ferrieri (DH)	2–5

School	Pitcher	IP	H	R	ER	BB	SO	AB	BF
Texas A&M Aggies	Lori Stoll (W)	12.0	5	0	0	1	14	40	42
Cal State Fullerton Titans	Susan LeFebvre (L)	12.0	3	2	0	5	4	40	45

=== All-Tournament Team ===
The following players were named to the All-Tournament Team

Pos	Name	School
1B	Sheila Cornell	UCLA
2B	Patti Holthaus	Texas A&M
3B	Cindy Cooper	Texas A&M
SS	Dot Richardson	UCLA
OF	Iva Jackson	Texas A&M
OF	Elise King	Cal St. Fullerton
OF	Mary Ricks	UCLA
OF	Vera Bahr	Cal St. Fullerton
P	Susan LeFebvre	Cal St. Fullerton
P	Lori Stoll	Texas A&M
C	Gay McNutt	Texas A&M
DH	Cindy Long	South Carolina

== See also ==
- 1983 NCAA Division II softball tournament
- 1983 NCAA Division III softball tournament
- 1983 NAIA softball tournament
- 1983 NCAA Division I baseball tournament
