= List of Texas A&M Aggies head softball coaches =

The Texas A&M Aggies softball program is a college softball team that represents Texas A&M University in the Southeastern Conference in the National Collegiate Athletic Association. The team has had 10 head coaches since it started playing organized softball in the 1972–73 season. The current coach is Jo Evans, who took over the head coaching position in 1997.

== Key ==
General
#	Number of coaches (Note: A running total of the number of head coaches.)
GC	Games coached

Overall
OW	Wins
OL	Losses
OT	Ties
O%	Winning percentage

Conference (Note: Texas A&M was a member of the Big 12 Conference from 1996 until joining the Southeastern Conference in 2013. The Aggies played as an independent for most of the period from 1972–73 to 1995, with limited records available on any conference affiliations during that time.)
CW	Wins
CL	Losses
CT	Ties
C%	Winning percentage

Postseason (Note: Postseason play involving the NCAA Division I Softball Championship or AIAW Women's College World Series.)
PA	Total Appearances (Note: Postseason appearances include seasons with NCAA Division I Softball Championship bids since the tournament began in 1982.)
PW	Total Wins
PL	Total Losses
WA	Women's College World Series appearances (Note: College World Series appearances include seasons with WCWS bids since the tournament began in 1969.)
WW	Women's College World Series wins
WL	Women's College World Series losses

Championships
CC	Conference regular season
CT	Conference tournament
NC	National championships (Note: Women's College World Series sponsored by either the AIAW or NCAA.)

== Coaches ==
List of head softball coaches showing season(s) coached, overall records, conference records, postseason records, championships and selected awards (Note: Statistics correct as of the end of the 2020 NCAA Division I softball season.)
#	Name	Term	GC	OW	OL	OT	O%	CW	CL	CT	C%	CCs	CTs	PA	WA	NCs
1	Mildred Little	1973	No records										—	—	—	—
2	Toby Crown	1974	No records										—	—	—	—
3	Kay Don	1974–1976 (Note: No records are available for Don's first two seasons.)	29	15	14	0	.517	N/A						—	—	—
4	Diane Quitta	1977	40	31	9	0	.775	N/A						—	—	—
5	Diane Justice/Don Smith	1978	53	33	20	0	.623	N/A						—	—	—
6	Bill Galloway	1979–1981	256	208	48	0	.813	N/A						—	3	0
7	Bob Brock	1982–96	943	688	255	0	.730	11	11	0	.500	—	—	10	6	3
8	Jo Evans	1997–2022	1,490	987	501	2	.663	257	243	1	.514	2	1	21	1	0
9	Trisha Ford	2023-present	174	127	47	0	.730	43	28	0	.652	0	1	3	0	0
