= 1985 NCAA Division I softball tournament =

- Teams: 16
- Finals site: Seymour Smith Park; Omaha, NE
- Champions: UCLA (3rd NCAA (4th overall) WCWS title)
- Runner-up: Nebraska (3rd WCWS Appearance)
- Winning coach: Sharron Backus (3rd NCAA (4th overall) WCWS title)

The 1985 NCAA Division I softball tournament was the fourth annual tournament to determine the national champion of NCAA women's collegiate softball. Held during May 1985, sixteen Division I college softball teams contested the championship. The tournament featured eight regionals of two teams with the winner of each region (a total of 8 teams) advancing to the 1985 Women's College World Series at Seymour Smith Park in Omaha, Nebraska. The event held from May 22 through May 26 marked the conclusion of the 1985 NCAA Division I softball season. UCLA won the championship by defeating Nebraska 2–1 in the final game. Nebraska's appearance was later vacated due to NCAA infractions.

== Regionals ==
West Regional
–	Cal State Fullerton	5	5	—
–	Central Michigan	0	0	—

- Cal State Fullerton qualifies for WCWS, 2–0

Mideast Regional
–	Northwestern	3	6	—
–	Indiana	2	0	—

- Northwestern qualifies for WCWS, 2–0

South Regional
–	Louisiana Tech	0	5	1
–	Texas A&M	3	0	0

- Louisiana Tech qualifies for WCWS, 2–1

Central Regional
–	Utah	1	3^{8}	2^{8}
–	Arizona State	2^{8}	2	1

- Utah qualifies for WCWS, 2–1

Midwest Regional
–	Nebraska†	1	6	2
–	Kansas	4^{9}	1	0

- Nebraska qualifies for WCWS, 2–1
- † Nebraska's wins vacated

Northeast Regional
–	Adelphi	2	2	—
–	Penn State	0	0	—

- Adelphi qualifies for WCWS, 2–0

Northwest Regional
–	Cal Poly Pomona	4	1	—
–	Fresno State	0	0	—

- Cal Poly Pomona qualifies for WCWS, 2–0

At-large Regional
–	UCLA	1	3	2
–	Pacific	3	0	0

- UCLA qualifies for WCWS, 2–1

== Women's College World Series ==
=== Participants ===
- Adelphi
- Cal Poly Pomona
- Cal State Fullerton
- Louisiana Tech
- Nebraska
- Northwestern
- UCLA
- Utah

=== Game results ===
==== Bracket ====
Upper round 1
Cal State Fullerton	1^{8}
Adelphi	0
Utah	0
UCLA	1
Northwestern	3
Cal Poly Pomona	6
Louisiana Tech	0
Nebraska	6

Upper round 2
Cal State Fullerton	2
UCLA	0
Cal Poly Pomona	0
Nebraska	2
Lower round 1
Adelphi	1
Utah	0
Northwestern	1^{8}
Louisiana Tech	0

Upper final
Cal State Fullerton	1
Nebraska	5
Lower round 2
Cal Poly Pomona	1^{8}
Adelphi	0
UCLA	1
Northwestern	0

Semifinals
Nebraska	0
UCLA	3
Cal State Fullerton	2^{8}
Cal Poly Pomona	1

Preliminary final
UCLA	1
Cal State Fullerton	0

Final
Nebraska	1
UCLA	2^{9}

==== Game log ====
Date	Game	Winning team	Score	Losing team	Notes
May 22	Game 1	Cal State Fullerton	1–0^{8}	Adelphi	
May 22	Game 2	UCLA	1–0	Utah	
May 23	Game 3	Cal Poly Pomona	6–3	Northwestern	
May 23	Game 4	Nebraska	6–0	Louisiana Tech	
May 24	Game 5	Adelphi	1–0	Utah	Utah eliminated
May 24	Game 6	Northwestern	1–0^{8}	Louisiana Tech	Louisiana Tech eliminated
May 24	Game 7	Cal State Fullerton	2–0	UCLA	
May 24	Game 8	Nebraska	2–0	Cal Poly Pomona	
May 25	Game 9	UCLA	1–0	Northwestern	Northwestern eliminated
May 25	Game 10	Cal Poly Pomona	1–0^{8}	Adelphi	Adelphi eliminated
May 25	Game 11	Nebraska	5–1	Cal State Fullerton	
May 25	Game 12	Cal State Fullerton	2–1^{8}	Cal Poly Pomona	Cal Poly Pomona eliminated
May 25	Game 13	UCLA	3–0	Nebraska	
May 26	Game 14	UCLA	1–0	Cal State Fullerton	Cal State Fullerton eliminated
May 26	Game 15	UCLA	2–1^{9}	Nebraska	UCLA wins WCWS

=== Championship Game ===
School	Top Batter	Stats.
UCLA Bruins	Chris Olivie (RF)	2-3 RBI BB
Nebraska Cornhuskers	Ginger Cannon (2B)	0-3 RBI BB

School	Pitcher	IP	H	R	ER	BB	SO	AB	BF
UCLA Bruins	Debbie Doom (W)	9.0	6	1	0	4	10	32	38
Nebraska Cornhuskers	Lori Sippel (L)	8.1	7	2	1	4	8	28	35

=== All-Tournament Team ===
The following players were named to the All-Tournament Team

Pos	Name	School
P	Debbie Doom	UCLA
P	Tracy Compton	UCLA
P	Lori Sippel	Nebraska
C	Lisa Busby	Nebraska
1B	Ginger Cannon	Nebraska
2B	Lori Richins	Nebraska
3B	Jo Ann Ferrieri	Cal State Fullerton
SS	Leslie Rover	UCLA
OF	Stacy Sunny	Nebraska
OF	Regina Dooley	Adelphi
OF	Alison Stowell	Cal Poly Pomona
U	Chris Olivie	UCLA

== See also ==
- 1985 NCAA Division II softball tournament
- 1985 NCAA Division III softball tournament
- 1985 NAIA softball tournament
- 1985 NCAA Division I baseball tournament
