= Michelle Gardner =

American softball coach and former player

Michelle (Bolster) Gardner
Current position
- Title: Head coach
- Team: Bowling Green
- Conference: MAC

Biographical details
- Born: c. 1966 (age 59–60); Petersburg, Michigan, U.S.

Playing career
- 1985–1988: Michigan
- 1994–1995: Raybestos Brakettes
- Position: Pitcher

Coaching career (HC unless noted)
- 1992–1994: Bowling Green (asst.)
- 1995–1998: Florida State (Asst.)
- 1999–2001: Arizona State (Asst.)
- 2003–2008: Nevada
- 2009–2017: Indiana
- 2023–2024: Coastal Carolina (asst.)
- 2025–Present: Bowling Green

Head coaching record
- Overall: 295–329 (.473)

Accomplishments and honors

Awards
- WAC Coach of the Year (2008)

Michelle "Mikey" Gardner, formerly Michelle Bolster, is an American softball coach and former player. Gardner is currently the head coach at Bowling Green. She was the head coach of the Indiana Hoosiers softball team from 2009 until 2017. She previously served as the head coach at the University of Nevada from 2003 to 2008. She also served as an assistant softball coach at Arizona State (1999–2001) and Florida State (1995–1998).

Gardner was a right-handed pitcher for the Michigan Wolverines softball team from 1985 to 1988 and for the Raybestos Brakettes from 1994 to 1995. She was named the Big Ten Conference Player of the Year in 1988.

== Early years ==
A native of Petersburg, Michigan, Gardner grew up in Monroe County, Michigan. She was an all-state softball player at Summerfield High School. She led Summerfield to a 26–1 record and a state championship in 1984.

== University of Michigan ==
Bolster played college softball for the Michigan Wolverines softball team from 1985 to 1988. She had two no-hitters during her Michigan career, one on May 3, 1985, and the other on May 4, 1988. During the 1988 season, she was Michigan's co-captain. That year, she compiled a 0.94 earned run average against Big Ten Conference opponents and was named the Big Ten Player of the Year and Michigan's Most Valuable Player; she was also named to the NFCA All-Mideast Region team in 1988.

== Professional softball ==
Bolster later played professional softball for the Raybestos Brakettes from 1994 to 1995. The Brakettes dominated the sport, winning 34 national championship games from 1958 to 1993 in the Women's World softball tournaments. In a 2000 profile on the Brakettes, The New York Times wrote that pitchers Joan Joyce, Bolster and others "made the team virtually unbeatable."

== Coaching career ==
Gardner was the head coach of the Indiana Hoosiers softball from 2009 to 2017. In her first five seasons as the head coach at Indiana, she compiled a record of 108–153 (.414).

Gardner previously served as the head coach at the University of Nevada from 2003 to 2008. She compiled a 187–176 record (.515)at Nevada. After leading Nevada to a 44–18 record in 2008, she was named the Western Athletic Conference Coach of the Year.

She also served as an assistant softball coach at Arizona State (1999–2001) and Florida State (1995–1998).

On September 22, 2022, Gardner joined the Coastal Carolina softball staff as an assistant.

On June 24, 2024, Gardner was announced as the new head coach of the Bowling Green softball program, returning to where she started her coaching career.

== Honors and personal life ==
Garner is married to William Gardner. They have one son and two daughters.

On August 3, 2023, Gardner was announced as part of the five-member Class of 2023, to be inducted into the Nevada Athletics Hall of Fame.
