= Josh Taylor (softball) =

American softball coach

Current position
- Title: Head coach
- Team: Louisiana Tech
- Conference: Sun Belt
- Record: 71–44 (.617)

Biographical details
- Education: Nevada

Playing career
- 1993–1994: Nevada

Coaching career (HC unless noted)

Baseball
- 2004–2007: Feather River College (asst.)

Softball
- 2007–2008: San Joaquin (AHC/RC)
- 2008–2011: Marysville Gold Sox (AHC)
- 2009–2012: Feather River College
- 2013–2016: Nevada (asst.)
- 2017–2021: Nevada
- 2022–Present: Louisiana Tech

Head coaching record
- Overall: 304–212 (.589)

Accomplishments and honors

Championships
- Golden Valley Champions (2010); CUSA Regular Season Champions (2022)

Awards
- Golden Valley Coach of the Year (2010); CUSA Coach of the Year (2022)

Josh Taylor is an American softball coach who is the current head coach at Louisiana Tech. He is the previous head coach at his alma mater, Nevada.

== Coaching career ==
=== Nevada ===
On August 17, 2016, Taylor was announced as the new head coach of the Nevada softball program.

=== Louisiana Tech ===
On June 7, 2021, Taylor was announced as the new head coach of the Louisiana Tech softball program. On June 8, 2022, Taylor signed a one-year extension with Louisiana Tech to keep him through 2027.

== Head coaching record ==
=== Community College ===
Record table
Season	Team	Overall	Conference	Standing	Postseason
Feather River Golden Eagles (Golden Valley Conference) (2009–2012)
2009	Feather River	21–22	9–11	3rd	
2010	Feather River	30–11	15–5	1st	
2011	Feather River	32–12	15–5	3rd	
2011	Feather River	30–14	14–6	2nd	
Feather River:		113–59 (.657)	53–27 (.663)		
Total:		113–59 (.657)			
National champion Postseason invitational champion Conference regular season champion Conference regular season and conference tournament champion Division regular season champion Division regular season and conference tournament champion Conference tournament champion

=== NCAA ===
Record table
Season	Team	Overall	Conference	Standing	Postseason
Nevada Wolf Pack (Mountain West Conference) (2017–2021)
2017	Nevada	30–25	13–11	5th	
2018	Nevada	27–27	12–12	5th	
2019	Nevada	29–27	11–13	7th	
2020	Nevada	10–14	0–0		
2021	Nevada	24–16	16–8	3rd	
Nevada:		120–109 (.524)	52–44 (.542)		
Louisiana Tech Lady Techsters (Conference USA) (2022–2026)
2022	Louisiana Tech	39–20	18–6	1st (West)	
2023	Louisiana Tech	32–24	13–11	7th	
2024	Louisiana Tech	0–0	0–0		
Louisiana Tech:		71–44 (.617)	31–17 (.646)		
Total:		191–153 (.555)			
National champion Postseason invitational champion Conference regular season champion Conference regular season and conference tournament champion Division regular season champion Division regular season and conference tournament champion Conference tournament champion
