= Atlantic Sun =

Local Newspaper of South Africa

The Atlantic Sun is a local newspaper for the West Coast region of Cape Town, Western Cape, South Africa. An affiliate of Cape Community Newspapers, the newspaper does not have its own website, but the news is distributed via IOL.
