= Maria Winn-Ratliff =

American softball coach

Current position
- Title: Head coach
- Team: Trinity Valley Community College

Biographical details
- Education: Columbia College

Playing career
- 1993–1995: Missouri Valley College
- 1995–1997: Columbia College

Coaching career (HC unless noted)
- 1999–2000: Bemidji State (asst.)
- 2000–2002: Armstrong State (asst.)
- 2003–2004: Central Methodist (asst.)
- 2005–2016: Western Nebraska CC
- 2017–2019: Tyler Junior College
- 2020: Louisiana Tech
- 2022–present: Trinity Valley CC

Head coaching record
- Overall: NJCAA: 699–260–1 (.729); NCAA: 8–16 (.333)
- Tournaments: NJCAA: 0–0 (–); NCAA: 0–0 (–)

Maria Winn-Ratliff is an American softball coach who is the current head coach at Trinity Valley CC.

== Coaching career ==
=== Tyler Junior College ===
On July 27, 2016, Winn-Ratliff was announced as the new head coach of the Tyler Junior College softball program.

=== Louisiana Tech ===
On September 23, 2019, Winn-Ratliff was announced as the new head coach of the Louisiana Tech softball program.

== Head coaching record ==
=== Junior college ===
Record table
| Season | Team | Overall | Conference | Standing | Postseason |
|---|---|---|---|---|---|
Western Nebraska Cougars (Region 9) (2005–2016)
| 2005 | Western Nebraska | 23–30 | | | |
| 2006 | Western Nebraska | 27–25–1 | | | |
| 2007 | Western Nebraska | 36–21 | | | |
| 2008 | Western Nebraska | 54–10 | | | |
| 2009 | Western Nebraska | 42–18 | | | |
| 2010 | Western Nebraska | 43–21 | | | |
| 2011 | Western Nebraska | 51–15 | | | |
| 2012 | Western Nebraska | 45–26 | | | |
| 2013 | Western Nebraska | 55–10 | 21–3 | | |
| 2014 | Western Nebraska | 50–15 | 16–6 | | |
| 2015 | Western Nebraska | 56–14 | 26–4 | 1st | NJCAA National Tournament |
| 2016 | Western Nebraska | 53–13 | 25–4 | 1st | District Championship Series |
| Western Nebraska: | | 535–218–1 (.710) | 88–17 (.838) | | |
Tyler Apaches (NJCAA Region XIV) (2017–2019)
| 2017 | Tyler | 51–19 | 24–4 | 1st (East Zone) | NJCAA National Tournament |
| 2018 | Tyler | 55–14 | 21–5 | 1st (East Zone) | NJCAA National Tournament |
| 2019 | Tyler | 58–9 | 26–2 | 1st (East Zone) | NJCAA National Tournament |
| Tyler: | | 164–42 (.796) | 71–11 (.866) | | |
| Total: | | 699–260–1 (.729) | | | |
National champion Postseason invitational champion Conference regular season champion Conference regular season and conference tournament champion Division regular season champion Division regular season and conference tournament champion Conference tournament champion

=== College ===
Record table
| Season | Team | Overall | Conference | Standing | Postseason |
|---|---|---|---|---|---|
Louisiana Tech Lady Techsters (Conference USA) (2020)
| 2020 | Louisiana Tech | 8–16 | 2–1 | 2nd (West) | |
| Louisiana Tech: | | 8–16 (.333) | 2–1 (.667) | | |
| Total: | | 8–16 (.333) | | | |
