= 1985 Southland Conference softball tournament =

- Teams: 7
- Format: Double-elimination tournament
- Finals site: ULM Softball Complex (Current name); Monroe, Louisiana
- Champions: Northeast Louisiana (1st title)
- Winning coach: Rosemary Holloway–Hill (1 title)

1985 Southland Conference softball standings
	Conf.				Overall
Team	W		L	PCT	W		L	PCT
Southwestern Louisiana ‍†‍‍	12	–	0	1.000	39	–	13	.750
Texas–Arlington ‍‍‍	8	–	4	.667	27	–	22	.551
Northeast Louisiana ‍‍‡‍	7	–	5	.583	34	–	32	.515
McNeese State ‍‍‍	7	–	5	.583	19	–	31	.380
Lamar ‍‍‍	6	–	6	.500	14	–	28	.333
North Texas ‍‍‍	2	–	10	.167	9	–	28	.243
Arkansas State ‍‍‍	0	–	12	.000	2	–	27	.069
† – Conference champion ‡ – Tournament champion y – Invited to the NCAA tournament As of May 20, 1985; Rankings from Coaches' Poll

The 1985 Southland Conference tournament was held in Monroe, Louisiana. Northeast Louisiana won the seven team tournament. The Indians season ended with the tournament championship as they were not selected to the compete in the 1985 NCAA Division I softball tournament.

== Format ==
The tournament was a 7 team double elimination format. All teams which competed in conference play were members of the tournament field. Regular season champion, Southwestern Louisiana, received a first round bye.

== Tournament ==
Round	Game	Matchup	Score	Notes
First round
1	1	Lamar vs. McNeese State	3–0	Lamar wins
1	2	Northeast Louisiana vs. North Texas State	2–1	Northeast Louisiana wins
1	3	Texas-Arlington vs. Arkansas State	1–0	Texas-Arlington wins
Winner's Bracket
2	4	Southwestern Louisiana vs. Lamar	5–1	Southwestern Louisiana wins
2	5	Northeast Louisiana vs. Texas-Arlington	2–1	Northeast Louisiana wins
Consolation Bracket
3	6	North Texas State vs. Arkansas State	5–3	Arkansas State eliminated
3	7	Texas-Arlington vs. McNeese State	3–1	McNeese State eliminated
3	8	North Texas State vs. Lamar	2–1	Lamar eliminated
3	9	North Texas State vs. Texas-Arlington	4–0	Texas-Arlington eliminated
Semifinals
4	10	Southwestern Louisiana vs. Northeast Louisiana	2–0	Southwestern Louisiana wins
4	11	Northeast Louisiana vs. North Texas State	10–4	North Texas State eliminated
Championship
5	12	Northeast Louisiana vs. Southwestern Louisiana	2–0	Northeast Louisiana wins game one.
5	13	Northeast Louisiana vs. Southwestern Louisiana	2–0	Northeast Louisiana wins championship.
