= List of NCAA Division I softball career ERA leaders =

There are currently 74 pitchers and 47 records in the sub-1.00 ERA club:

- Note every player on the list played four seasons (except those currently with one year eligibility remaining) totaling at least 600 innings pitched.

Earned Run Average	Pitcher	School(s)	Years
0.15	Tracy Compton	UCLA Bruins	1982–1985
0.29	Debbie Doom	UCLA Bruins	1982–1985
0.33	Susan LeFebvre	Cal State Fullerton Titans	1983–1986
0.37	Stacey Johnson	Louisiana Tech Lady Techsters	1983–1986
0.38	Karen Snelgrove	Missouri Tigers	1989–1992
0.39	Lisa Longaker	UCLA Bruins	1987–1990
0.40	Rhonda Wheatley	Cal Poly Pomona Broncos	1984–1987
0.42	Terry Carpenter	Fresno State Bulldogs	1989–1992
0.43	Shawn Andaya	Texas A&M Aggies	1984–1987
0.44	Leslie Partch	California Golden Bears	1979–1982
0.45	Julie Buldoc	Adelphi Panthers	1984–1987
0.46	Michele Granger	California Golden Bears	1989–1993
0.47	Lisa Ishikawa	Northwestern Wildcats	1984–1987
0.48	Virginia Augusta	North Carolina Tar Heels	1984–1987
0.50	Kyla Hall	ULL Ragin' Cajuns	1991–1994
0.50	Cat Osterman	Texas Longhorns	2002–2006
0.51	Jamie Southern	Fresno State Bulldogs	2001–2005
0.53	Amy Unterbrink	Indiana Hoosiers	1983–1986
0.54	Amanda Scott	Fresno State Bulldogs	1997–2000
0.54	Terri Whitmarsh	Missouri State Bears	1983–1986
0.55	Carie Dever	Fresno State Bulldogs	1987–1990
0.56	Melanie Parrent	Fresno State Bulldogs	1985–1988
0.57	Tami Johnston	Toledo Rockets	1984–1987
0.63	Debby Day	UTA Mavericks & Arizona Wildcats	1988–1992
0.63	Susie Parra	Arizona Wildcats	1991–1994
0.65	Stefni Whitton	ULL Ragin' Cajuns	1987–1990
0.66	Debbie DeJohn	FSU Seminoles	1987–1990
0.66	Marcie Green	Fresno State Bulldogs	1990–1993
0.67	Shelley Mahoney	Pacific Tigers	1982–1985
0.68	Julie Larsen	FSU Seminoles	1985–1988
0.68	Stephani Williams	Kansas Jayhawks	1991–1994
0.69	Tiffany Boyd	UCLA Bruins & Cal State Fullerton Titans	1989–1993
0.69	Tracy Bunge	Kansas Jayhawks	1983–1986
0.69	Laura Davis	Nicholls State Colonels	1982–1985
0.69	Sarah Pauly	Corpus Christi Islanders	2003–2005
0.70	Karen Jackson	Iowa Hawkeyes	1991–1994
0.71	Danielle Henderson	UMass Minutewomen	1996–1999
0.74	Margaret Sutter	California Golden Bears	1981–1984
0.74	Alexandra Mogill	Eastern Illinois Panthers	1985–1988
0.75	Michele Smith	Oklahoma State Cowgirls	1986–1989
0.77	Kathy Blake	CSUN Matadors	1992–1995
0.77	Lori Harrigan	UNLV Rebels	1989–1992
0.78	Sarah Dawson	ULM Warhawks	1994–1997
0.78	Angela Tincher	Virginia Tech Hokies	2005–2008
0.79	Monica Abbott	Tennessee Lady Vols	2004–2007
0.79	Debbie Nichols	Louisiana Tech Lady Techsters	1987–1990
0.80	Keira Goerl	UCLA Bruins	2001–2004
0.80	Sandy Green	Stephen F. Austin Ladyjacks	1987–1990
0.81	Terri McFarland	Iowa Hawkeyes	1989–1992
0.84	Christy Larsen	FSU Seminoles	1988–1991
0.86	NiJaree Canady	Stanford Cardinal & Texas Tech Red Raiders	2023–2025
0.86	Lindsay Chouinard	DePaul Blue Demons	2000–2003
0.87	Alicia Hollowell	Arizona Wildcats	2003–2006
0.87	Mary Letourneau	Long Beach State 49ers	1990–1993
0.88	Cheryl Longeway	Cal State Fullerton Titans & ULL Ragin' Cajuns	1992–1996
0.89	DeAnna Earsley	Utah State Aggies	1990–1993
0.89	Britni Sneed	LSU Tigers	1999–2002
0.91	Teresa Cherry	Arizona Wildcats	1985–1988
0.91	Leigh Podlesny	UIC Flames	1989–1992
0.92	Trinity Johnson	Cal State Fullerton Titans & South Carolina Gamecocks	1994–1997
0.94	Amanda Freed	UCLA Bruins	1999–2002
0.94	Vicki Morrow	Michigan Wolverines	1984–1987
0.94	Lisa Palmer	Virginia Cavaliers	1986–1989
0.95	Bernie Coffman	Ball State Cardinals	1986–1989
0.95	Monica Triner	USF Bulls	1996–1999
0.96	Bonnie Ebenkamp	Cal Poly Pomona Broncos	1990–1993
0.97	Courtney Blades	Nicholls State Colonels & Southern Miss Golden Eagles	1997–2000
0.98	Maureen Brady	Fresno State Bulldogs	1992–1995
0.98	Jennie Ritter	Michigan Wolverines	2003–2006
0.98	Nicole Terpstra	DePaul Blue Demons	1996–1999
0.99	Brandice Balschmiter	UMass Minutewomen	2006–2009
0.99	Kristy Burch	Miami RedHawks	1987–1990
0.99	Nicole Myers	FAU Owls	1999–2002
0.99	Stacey Nelson	Florida Gators	2006–2009

== Progression ==
Debbie Doom ended her career pitching a 9-inning win in the 1985 Women's College World Series final vs. the Nebraska Cornhuskers. She only allowed an unearned run to solidify her career ERA in 725.2 innings. She was one of the first NCAA Division I pitchers to accomplish a sub-1.00 ERA for a four-year career Debby Day and Christy Larsen were the first to pitch their entire careers from 43 ft., whereas all others prior to the 1988 season pitched from 40 ft. distance to the mound.

== Shutouts ==
In addition, there are currently 24 pitchers in the sub-1.00 ERAs club that amassed at least 60 career shutouts:

Monica Abbott – 112; Michele Granger – 94; Cat Osterman – 85; Debbie Nichols – 84; Rhonda Wheatly – 83; Alicia Hollowell – 81; Jamie Southern – 79; Courtney Blades – 77; Sarah Dawson 74; Shawn Andaya – 73; Terry Carpenter – 73; Danielle Henderson – 71; Debby Day – 70; Brandice Balschmiter – 68; Amanda Scott – 68; Debbie Doom – 66; Keira Goerl – 64; Stephani Williams – 64; Leslie Partch - 63; Stacey Johnson – 62; Lisa Longaker – 61; Susie Parra – 61; Amy Unterbrink – 61; Stacey Nelson – 60.

== Records & Milestones ==
Courtney Blades won the most games with an NCAA record 52 and 0.89 ERA in 2000 and also has the most earned runs in a career for the list at 176. As a sophomore in 1988, Debbie Nichols tossed another NCAA all-time and Sophomore Class record 36 shutouts, producing an 0.53 ERA. Rhonda Wheatly pitched the all-time and Sophomore Class record 434.1 innings and had an 0.27 ERA. Maureen Brady threw just 41.1 innings as a freshman in a non-injury season and had an 0.85 ERA. Debbie Doom set the all-time Junior Class ERA record in 1984 by giving up a list best 3 earned runs for a 0.10 ERA; Melanie Parrent matched that earned run total as a freshman and had an 0.25 ERA. Doom also surrendered the fewest earned runs on the list for a career at 30. The most earned runs allowed by a pitcher on the list is 66 by Nicole Myers in her freshman campaign for a 2.05 ERA. Stacey Nelson had the highest ERA on the list in her freshman year of 2006 at 2.10. The most career innings thrown by a pitcher on the list is Monica Abbott's NCAA record 1448.0; Vicki Morrow pitched 700.2 for her career, the minimal innings of any pitcher on the list.

Along with Doom's 1984 ERA, Karen Snelgrove (0.18 ERAs in 1991–1992) and Tami Johnston (0.21 ERA in 1985) rank in the top-10 for an NCAA season in ERA. Additionally, Lisa Longaker (0.29 ERA in 1988), Tiffany Boyd (0.24 ERA in 1989), Snelgrove in 1991, Trinity Johnson (0.37 ERA in 1997), Amanda Scott (0.24 and 0.40 ERAs in 1999–2000), Amanda Freed (0.46 ERA in 2001), Jamie Southern (0.44 and 0.54 ERAs in 2002, 2004), Cat Osterman (0.37, 0.36 and 0.41 ERAs in 2003, 2005–2006), Angela Tincher (0.56 and 0.63 ERAs in 2007–2008) and Stacey Nelson (0.61 ERA in 2009) were tops for those NCAA seasons.

Finally, Doom (0.31, 0.10 and 0.27 ERAs in 1982 and 1984–1985), Susan LeFebvre (0.27 ERA in 1986), Shawn Andaya (0.44 ERA in 1987), Boyd (0.29 ERA in 1989), Debby Day (0.49 ERA in 1991), Susie Parra (0.43, 0.63 and 1.04 ERAs in 1991, 1993–1994), Scott (0.79 ERA in 1998), Freed (0.96 ERA in 1999), Keira Goerl (0.63 and 1.02 ERAs in 2003–2004), Jennie Ritter (0.92 ERA in 2005) and Alicia Hollowell (0.89 ERA in 2006) all won NCAA National Championships those years; Marcie Green and Parra each matched the Women's College World Series record with a zero ERA in 1990 and 1992 respectively, each throwing the second-most innings pitched without allowing an earned run at a series. For their careers, Lisa Ishikawa (Big 10), Scott (WAC), Terri Whitmarsh (MVC), Johnston (MAC), Sarah Pauly (Big South), Danielle Henderson (A-10), Abbott (SEC), Lindsay Chouinard (USA), Nicole Terpstra (Summit) and Nicole Myers (A-Sun) all hold their conference crowns for earned run average.

== See also ==
- List of NCAA Division I softball career strikeout leaders
- List of NCAA Division I softball career win leaders
