= Rhode Island Rams softball =

College softball team

Rhode Island Rams
- University: University of Rhode Island
- Head coach: Whitney Goldstein (5th season)
- Conference: Atlantic 10
- Location: Kingston, Rhode Island, US
- Home stadium: URI Softball Complex
- Nickname: Rams
- Colors: Keaney blue, navy blue, and white

NCAA Tournament appearances
- 1983

The Rhode Island Rams softball is the team that represents the University of Rhode Island in NCAA Division I college softball. The team currently participates in the Atlantic 10 Conference (A-10). The Rams are led by their head coach Whitney Goldstein. The team plays its home games at URI Softball Complex which is located on the university's campus.

== History ==
Despite making the NCAA Division I softball tournament in their first season in the Atlantic 10 Conference in 1983, the Rams have failed to return to win either a regular season or a conference tournament championship. By failing to win the latter, they have also failed to return to the NCAA tournament.

In the 1983 tournament, Rhode Island was placed in the Northeast Regional, where they were eliminated by UCLA in two games, both 1–0 extra inning losses.

The Rams have won several awards during their stint in the Atlantic 10. In 1994, Melissa Jarrell was named A–10 Coach of the Year. The program has won three A–10 Player of the Year awards, doing so in 1994 with Anne Kelsen and in 1997 and 1998 with Kellie Cookus.

In April 2014, six former players, two then-active players, and one assistant coach came out with accusations of alleged bullying by former head coach Erin Layton. The accusers claim abuse was overlooked by University of Rhode Island administration for years, with only a brief administrative leave as punishment. Several players and assistants reported mental and physical abuse dealt out by Layton. Despite the allegations, Layton received both a contract extension in July 2014 as well as the full support of the school, who stated that complaints were taken seriously and no wrongdoing was found to have occurred. Layton left the program after the 2015 season.

=== Rhode Island in the NCAA Tournament ===
Year	Record	Pct	Notes
1983	0–2	.000	Northeast Regional
TOTALS	0-2	.000	

=== Coaching history ===
Years	Coach	Record	%
1978–1984	Nancy Langham	164–70–1	.700
1985–1992	Sue Tougas	131–201–3	.396
1993–1999	Melissa Jarrell	156–189–2	.452
2000–2002	Kim Staehle	70–89–1	.441
2003–2005	Christina Sutcliffe	44–88	.333
2006–2008	Deb Smith	44–100	.306
2009–2015	Erin Layton	87–260–2	.252
2016–2021	Bridget Hurlman	61–167	.268
2022–present	Whitney Goldstein	34–66–1	.342

== Roster ==
2024 Rhode Island Rams roster
Pitchers: 28 – Ashley Arnold – Freshman; 20 – Ashley Hibbard – Sophomore; 12 – Anna Jardin – Freshman; 11 – Liz Lynchard – Graduate Student; 72 – Noelle Sterner – Junior; 18 – Avery Vale-Cruz – Freshman; 29 – Lauren Wasikowski – Sophomore; 16 – Cameron Whiteford – Junior; 22 – Katie Zaun – Junior; Catchers: 2 – Kylie Bulinski – Sophomore; 8 – Natalie Maleitzke – Freshman; 25 – Vicki Viaclovsky – Senior	Outfielders: 10 – Leilyn Alvarez – Junior; 31 – Mandi Hanewich – Sophomore; 34 – Hannah Hernandez – Sophomore; 7 – Skyler Rapuano – Graduate Student; 5 – Sydney Yoder – Graduate Student; Infielders: 17 – Riley Frickleton – Freshman; 9 – Elena Gonzalez – Graduate Student; 23 – Maddie Melice – Senior; 30 – Emily Power – Junior; 27 – Zoe Rensel – Freshman; 3 – Cassie Swenson – Graduate Student; 13 – Becca Zawistowski – Sophomore; Utility: 4 – Casey Miller – Sophomore

== Season-by-season results ==
Record table
Season	Coach	Overall	Conference	Standing	Postseason
Rhode Island Rams (AIAW) (1978–1982)
1978	Nancy Langham	15–7			
1979	Nancy Langham	24–6			
1980	Nancy Langham	23–7			
1981	Nancy Langham	26–12			
1982	Nancy Langham	27–14–1			
Rhode Island Rams (Atlantic 10 Conference) (1983–present)
1983	Nancy Langham	28–10		2nd	NCAA Regionals
1984	Nancy Langham	21–11			
1985	Sue Tougas	22–19–1	3–7	5th	
1986	Sue Tougas	27–23–1	6–4	5th	
1987	Sue Tougas	11–27	5–5	4th	
1988	Sue Tougas	16–31	5–7	5th	
1989	Sue Tougas	16–28	6–6	T–4th	
1990	Sue Tougas	16–21	5–7	5th	
1991	Sue Tougas	12–28–1	1–9	6th	
1992	Sue Tougas	11–24	7–3	2nd	
1993	Melissa Jarrell	15–29	2–8	5th	
1994	Melissa Jarrell	27–28	7–3	2nd	
1995	Melissa Jarrell	23–26	5–5	4th	
1996	Melissa Jarrell	25–22	10–6	3rd	
1997	Melissa Jarrell	25–20–1	7–8–1	6th	
1998	Melissa Jarrell	21–29	7–8	5th	
1999	Melissa Jarrell	20–35–1	6–10	6th	
2000	Kim Staehle	20–30–1	6–9	7th	
2001	Kim Staehle	30–30	9–11	5th	
2002	Kim Staehle	20–29	13–9	T–2nd	
2003	Christina Sutcliffe	21–22	8–8	6th	
2004	Christina Sutcliffe	15–31	2–8	7th	
2005	Christina Sutcliffe	8–35	3–11	8th	
2006	Deb Smith	20–27	8–12	T–6th	
2007	Deb Smith	10–35	3–14	11th	
2008	Deb Smith	14–38	4–16	11th	
2009	Erin Layton	14–37	3–17	11th	
2010	Erin Layton	19–35	8–12	T–6th	
2011	Erin Layton	7–46	2–18	1th	
2012	Erin Layton	21–32–1	5–14–1	10th	
2013	Erin Layton	10–37	3–18	11th	
2014	Erin Layton	13–32–1	6–11–1	8th	
2015	Erin Layton	3–41	1–21	10th	
2016	Bridget Hurlman	12–32	3–18	10th	
2017	Bridget Hurlman	11–31	8–13	8th	
2018	Bridget Hurlman	12–35	3–17	8th	
2019	Bridget Hurlman	17–29	6–14	8th	
2020	Bridget Hurlman	4–16	0–0	N/A	Season cut short due to COVID-19 pandemic
2021	Bridget Hurlman	5–22	2–12	8th	
2022	Whitney Goldstein	11–35	4–19	9th	
2023	Whitney Goldstein	23–31–1	12–13	6th	
2024	Whitney Goldstein	0–0	0–0		
Total:		791–1,230–10 (.392)			
National champion Postseason invitational champion Conference regular season champion Conference regular season and conference tournament champion Division regular season champion Division regular season and conference tournament champion Conference tournament champion

== See also ==
- List of NCAA Division I softball programs
