= Bill Galloway =

American college softball coach

Current position
- Title: Associate head coach
- Team: East Texas Baptist
- Conference: ASC

Biographical details
- Education: Indiana

Coaching career (HC unless noted)
- 1979–1981: Texas A&M
- 1982–2002: Louisiana Tech
- 2003–2007: East Texas Baptist (assistant)
- 2008–present: East Texas Baptist (associate HC)

Head coaching record
- Overall: 912–383–2

Bill Galloway is an American college softball coach. He is most notable for his time as head coach of Texas A&M, during which his teams appeared in the Women's College World Series all three of his seasons and won at least 58 games each season, and his time as head coach at Louisiana Tech, where his teams recorded 705 wins and made 3 appearances in the Women's College World Series. Galloway won his 900th game in 2002, and was inducted into the National Fastpitch Coaches Association Hall of Fame in 2001. After retiring as head coach, he became a part-time pitching coach for East Texas Baptist and later joined the staff as a full-time assistant.
