= Nevada Wolf Pack softball =

NCAA Division I college softball team

- Founded: 1973
- University: University of Nevada, Reno
- Head coach: Victoria Hayward (2nd season)
- Conference: Mountain West
- Location: Reno, Nevada, US
- Home stadium: Christina M. Hixson Softball Park (capacity: 1,000)
- Nickname: Wolf Pack
- Colors: Navy blue and silver

NCAA Tournament appearances
- 2006, 2008, 2009

Conference tournament championships
- WAC; 2006 MWC

Regular-season conference championships
- WAC; 2008, 2009 MWC; 2025

The Nevada Wolf Pack softball is the team represents University of Nevada, Reno in NCAA Division I college softball. As of the current 2026 season, the team participates in the Mountain West Conference. The Wolf Pack are currently led by their head coach Victoria Hayward. The team plays its home games at Christina M. Hixson Softball Park located on the university's campus.

== Coaching history ==
Years	Coach	Record	%
1973–1979	Olena Plummer	68–35–2	.657
1980–1989	Pat Hixson	174–212–1	.451
2003–2008	Michelle Gardner	187–176	.515
2009–2016	Matt Meuchel	196–217	.475
2017–2021	Josh Taylor	71–44	.617
2022–2023	Linda Garza	48–54	.471
2024	Marina Demore	40–17	.702
2025–present	Victoria Hayward	41–14	.745

== Postseason - NCAA ==
Year	Tournament Record	Opponent	Result
2006	0–2	Oregon State; Portland State	L 1-2; L 1-2
2008	2–2	Purdue; UCLA; Purdue; UCLA	W 4-1; L 4-6; W 2-1; L 3-4
2009	1–2	Cal Poly; Stanford; Cal Poly	W 4-1; L 1-9; L 1-6

== Championships ==
=== Conference Championships ===
Season	Conference	Record	Head Coach
2008	Western Athletic Conference	16–2	Michelle Gardner
2009	Western Athletic Conference	15–5	Matt Meuchel

=== Conference Tournament Championships ===
Season	Conference	Location	Head Coach
2006	WAC	Fresno, CA	Michelle Gardner

=== Coaching staff ===
Name	Position	First year	Alma mater
Victoria Hayward	Head coach	2025	Washington
Delanie Wisz	Assistant coach	2025	UCLA
Carli Cutler	Assistant coach, pitching	2025	UConn
Jillian Celis	Assistant coach	2025	San Diego State
