= Debbie Doom =

American softball player (born 1963)

Debra "Debbie" Ann Doom (born January 1, 1963) is an American retired professional softball pitcher. She played college softball for the UCLA from 1982 to 1985, where she was a three-time National Champion. She was also a member of the United States women's national softball team just prior to the major boom in the sport's popularity both in America and worldwide. She was the singularly most dominant pitcher in softball during her career and was remarkable for her exceptional fastball and her height (6' 1/4"). She ranks currently in numerous softball records for the Bruins and in the NCAA Division I. Doom was named the Women's Professional Softball League's inaugural World Series MVP in 1997.

== University of California, Los Angeles ==
UCLA recruited Doom out of Tempe, Arizona, where she played high school softball. She opened her career by breaking and setting school season records for strikeouts and strikeout ratio, the latter of which led the NCAA.

On April 20, 1982, Doom set the single-game strikeout record-now fourth best-in NCAA history when she fanned 25 batters against the Cal State Fullerton Titans. The total remains the Freshman Class single game record for the NCAA. She would match it twice in her career before Michele Granger surpassed her in 1993. On May 15, Doom threw her first perfect game vs. the Wyoming Cowgirls.

The Bruins made the inaugural NCAA Women's College World Series softball tournament and Doom opened her series with a 13-inning victory over the Oklahoma State Cowgirls on May 27. Doom set the tournament record for single-game strikeouts with 20. On May 29, she won back-to-back games vs. the Western Michigan Broncos (in relief and combining for a perfect game) and the Arizona State Sun Devils (striking out 11 in 7 innings, a WCWS record). Doom marched forward with a 10-inning shutout over the Cal State Fullerton Titans in the semifinals to reach the championship game as a freshman. She allowed only two hits in 8 innings as her Bruins downed the Fresno State Bulldogs 2–0 on May 31, thanks to a throwing error and sacrifice fly in the eighth inning. Doom was named to the All-Tournament Team for her 5 wins, 62 strikeouts, 41.2 innings pitched efforts.

For her sophomore campaign, Doom was named a National Fastpitch Coaches Association First Team All-American and won honors from the now defunct WCAA. She broke her own strikeouts record and again led the NCAA in strikeout ratio. Doom pitched an 11-inning no-hitter on March 7 vs. the Creighton Bluejays.

The UCLA Bruins made it back to the WCWS to defend their title and Doom started off by breaking her own record with 15 strikeouts in regulation over the Louisiana Tech Lady Techsters on May 26. The next game, she suffered her first loss to the Cal State Fullerton Titans, who tagged her for 6 earned runs. She responded by besting the South Carolina Gamecocks in 17 innings on May 28. Doom and the Bruins were eliminated by the eventual champions, the Texas A&M Aggies, after 14 innings on May 29.

Doom had a banner year in 1984, being named First Team All-American and winning the Honda Sports Award for softball. She broke her own season records with career bests in strikeouts, WHIP, ERA (NCAA Junior Class record) and shutouts totals, the two latter categories being second best for an NCAA season and still remaining top-10 all-time; along with her wins, she also earned a conference pitching Triple Crown for the WCAA. Doom also had a no-hitter and a perfect game to her credit.

From February 25 to April 6, Doom achieved a 102-scoreless-inning streak, which remained tops until Danielle Henderson posted a new record in 1999.

Making their third consecutive bid for a national title, Doom gave her team a shutout performance to open that year's WCWS vs. the Utah State Aggies. They suffered an extra-inning loss to the Texas A&M Aggies in their next game. Doom won in relief against the Nebraska Cornhuskers on May 28 and the next day returned the shutout against the Aggies in the semifinals. Doom faced the Aggies for a third time in the finale that lasted 13 innings with the Bruins celebrating a second national championship on May 29. Doom again made the All-Tournament Team.

Doom received final Second Team All-American and All-WCAA accolades. She posted a top-10 shutout total to accompany three perfect games for the Bruins. The perfect game total was a new NCAA season record and remains top-5; Doom, along with Beth Hawkins of the Bradley Braves, were the first pitchers to reach the total in a season.

For a final time with Doom on the mound, the Bruins made the 1985 World Series, though Doom lost her first match with the Cal State Fullerton Titans on May 24. The game was notable as Doom surrendered her only career home run to Robin Goodin. Doom rebounded with a shutout over the Nebraska Cornhuskers the next day. With help from Tracy Compton, Doom was able to pitch her third national championship game, a 9-inning win over the Cornhuskers on May 26. She was named to the All-Tournament Team for final time.

At the end of her World Series career, Doom remains the only pitcher to win three NCAA Division I WCWS softball championships and one of the rare to have appeared every year of her career. The 1984 championship saw Doom set the ultimate strikeout record for a title game at 15; UCLA Bruin Anjelica Selden would set the record for the three-game format in 2005 with 13; no one has beaten Doom's finale game tally. Overall, she went 13–4 with 178 strikeouts, 7 shutouts and allowing 12 earned runs, 77 hits and 25 walks in 146.1 innings for an 0.57 ERA and 0.70 WHIP.

Doom left UCLA atop the lists for career wins, strikeouts, shutouts and innings pitched. She was second in ERA. Currently, she ranks top-10 in all the same categories. In the NCAA Division I, Doom set and is now tied third in perfect games (5), ERA (which was second) is now third best and her shutouts were the record and now sit inside the top-15 all-time for a career.

== After UCLA ==
Recognizing her dominance, the NCAA placed Doom on its All-Decade Team in 1991 and its 25th Anniversary NCAA Division I Women's Softball All-Star Team in 2006.

UCLA inducted Doom into its Athletic Hall of Fame in 1995.

In 1997 at age 34, Doom pitched for the Orlando Wahoos (now the Akron Racers) in Women's Pro Fastpitch (now National Pro Fastpitch). She led the league in ERA (0.42) and opponents' batting average (.153), while also placing in the league's top-5 in four other pitching categories. She went 3–0 in the championship series against the Virginia Roadsters and was named series MVP.

Doom was a consistent member of Team USA and among her highlights was pitching two consecutive perfect games at the 1991 Pan American Games, an unmatched feat.

On February 15, 2014, UCLA retired her jersey (#17). She was also included in the Arizona Softball Hall of Fame in 2014.

== Career statistics ==
=== UCLA Bruins ===
| YEAR | W | L | GP | GS | CG | SHO | SV | IP | H | R | ER | BB | SO | ERA | WHIP |
| 1982 | 11 | 2 | 15 | 13 | 12 | 9 | 0 | 134.1 | 63 | 6 | 6 | 25 | 193 | 0.31 | 0.65 |
| 1983 | 18 | 6 | 25 | 25 | 24 | 16 | 0 | 196.0 | 82 | 20 | 14 | 33 | 245 | 0.50 | 0.58 |
| 1984 | 24 | 3 | 28 | 27 | 27 | 24 | 0 | 215.1 | 77 | 5 | 3 | 29 | 282 | 0.10 | 0.49 |
| 1985 | 20 | 5 | 25 | 25 | 25 | 17 | 0 | 180.0 | 81 | 14 | 7 | 20 | 232 | 0.27 | 0.56 |
| TOTALS | 73 | 16 | 93 | 90 | 88 | 66 | 0 | 725.2 | 303 | 45 | 30 | 107 | 952 | 0.29 | 0.56 |

== See also ==
- NCAA Division I softball career -1.00 ERAs list
