= Louisiana Tech Lady Techsters softball =

- University: Louisiana Tech
- Head coach: Josh Taylor (5th season)
- Conference: Sun Belt
- Location: Ruston, Louisiana, US
- Home stadium: Dr. Billy Bundrick Field (capacity: 1,000)
- Nickname: Lady Techsters
- Colors: Blue and red

NCAA WCWS appearances
- 1983, 1985, 1986

NCAA Tournament appearances
- 1983, 1984, 1985, 1986, 1987, 1988, 1989, 1995, 2008, 2017, 2019

Conference tournament championships
- 2008, 2017, 2019

Regular-season conference championships
- 2019, 2022

The Louisiana Tech Lady Techsters softball is the team represents Louisiana Tech University in NCAA Division I college softball. The team currently participates in the Sun Belt Conference. They are currently coached by their head coach Josh Taylor. They play their home games at Dr. Billy Bundrick Field. The Lady Techsters have made eleven NCAA Tournament appearances in program history and have advanced to the Women's College World Series a total of three times.

On April 25, 2019, a tornado struck the Louisiana Tech campus, completely destroying the team's home stadium that was then known as the Lady Techster Softball Complex. In March 2020, construction began on a new stadium which was completed and unveiled as the Lady Techsters' new home ahead of the 2021 spring season.

== History ==
In Bill Galloway’s first season as head coach of the Lady Techsters in 1981, he led Tech to a record of 52-18 and the first of three trips to the College World Series, and the tradition of winning and dominance throughout the 1980s began. Louisiana Tech reached the NCAA tournament the next six seasons, including two additional College World Series appearances in 1985 and 1986.

Overall, the Lady Techsters boast three Louisiana Tech College World Series teams (1983, 1985, 1986), 11 NCAA Regional squads (1982, 1983, 1984, 1985, 1986, 1987, 1988, 1995, 2008, 2017, 2019) and five NFCA All-Americans.

== Facilities ==
=== Lady Techster Softball Complex (1982–2019) ===
The Lady Techster Softball Complex was home to Louisiana Tech Softball from 1982 until April 25, 2019 when an EF3 tornado destroyed the facility along with a number of other athletic complexes. During the course of the Lady Techsters’ 38-year history of playing at the facility, Tech posted an overall mark of 466–234, including 26 winning seasons. Initially built at a cost of $200,000 in the early 1980s under the supervision of former head coach Bill Galloway and former Tech president F. Jay Taylor, the 550-seat facility boasts brick-walled dugouts, wooden lockers, lights, batting cage and electronic scoreboard. At the time of its completion in the early ’80s, it was considered one of the finest softball facilities in the country as the nationally-ranked Louisiana Tech squads drew large crowds.

=== Dr. Billy Bundrick Field (since 2021) ===
On March 5, 2021, Dr. Billy Bundrick field was christened as the new facility for LA Tech. The field was named in honor of an orthopedic surgeon who has given 40 years of service to the University.

=== Attendance Record ===
Louisiana Tech saw a program record 1,927 fans attend the Lady Techsters home game versus LSU on March 15, 2016.

== Players ==
=== All-Americans ===
Player	Pos.	Year(s)	Team	Notes
Lea Ann Jarvis	C	1984, 1985	1st Team, 1st Team	LA Tech Athletic Hall of Fame; Number retired (#20)
Stacey Johnson	P	1986	1st Team	LA Tech Athletic Hall of Fame; Number retired (#6)
Debbie Nichols-Hedrick	P	1988, 1989, 1990	1st Team, 2nd team, 2nd Team	LA Tech Athletic Hall of Fame; Number retired (#13)

=== Academic All-Americans ===
- Faith Holman (1986)
- Stacey Johnson (1986)
- Paige England (1997, 1998, 1999)
- Erica St. Romain (1999)

=== All-Region ===
==== First Team ====
- Amberly Waits, shortstop (2009) (Inducted into LA Tech Athletic Hall of Fame, Oct 2019)

=== National & Conference Awards ===
- C-USA Player of the Year

Morgan Turkoly (OF) - 2018
Jazlyn Crowder (OF) - 2019

- C-USA Freshman of the Year

Lindsay Edwards (3B) - 2019

- C-USA Pitcher of the Year

Preslee Gallaway (P) - 2018

- Senior Class Award

Morgan Turkoly - 2019

- WAC Player of the Year

Amberly Waits (SS) - 2009

- WAC Freshman of the Year

Anna Cross (SS/P) - 2013

=== National Pro Fastpitch Draft ===
Year	Player	Position	Team
2010	Amberly Waits	Shortstop	Chicago Bandits (No. 8 overall selection)

== Coaches ==
Years	Name	Seasons	Games	Win	Loss	Tie	Pct.
1980	Barry Canterbury	1	29	7	22	0	.241
1981	Gary Blair	1	35	18	17	0	.514
1981–2002	Bill Galloway	21	1059	705	352	2	.667
2003–2012	Sarah Dawson	8	464	198	266	0	.427
2013–2019	Mark Montgomery	7	389	226	163	0	.581
2020	Maria Winn-Ratliff	1	24	8	16	0	.333
2021	Bianca Duran (Interim)	1	52	22	30	0	.423
2022–present	Josh Taylor	1 (active; as of 2022)					

=== Hall of Fame ===
- Bill Galloway, head coach (2001)

=== Regional Coach of the Year ===
- Bill Galloway, head coach (1988)

== Results ==
=== Women's College World Series Results ===
Year	Rival	Round	W/L	Score
1983	Pacific; UCLA; Texas A&M	First Round; Second Round; First Round	W L L	7–0; 0–8; 0–2
1985	Nebraska; Northwestern	First Round; First Round	L L	0–6; 0–5; 0–1
1986	Indiana; Creighton	First Round; First Round	L L	0–1; 3–4

=== Year-by-Year Results ===
Season	Coach	Overall				Conference				Notes
Season	Coach	Games	Win	Loss	Tie	Games	Win	Loss	Tie	Notes
Sun Belt Conference
2001	Bill Galloway	51	20	31	0	20	4	16	0	
Western Athletic Conference
2002	Sarah Dawson	48	21	27	0	24	3	21	0	
2003	Sarah Dawson	58	16	42	0	20	6	14	0	
2004	Sarah Dawson	60	27	33	0	21	10	11	0	
2005	Sarah Dawson	67	18	49	0	18	2	16	0	
2006	Sarah Dawson	49	18	31	0	17	6	11	0	
2007	Sarah Dawson	60	22	38	0	18	3	15	0	
2008	Sarah Dawson	66	37	29	0	17	7	10	0	WAC Tournament Champions; NCAA Regional Finals
2009	Sarah Dawson	57	34	23	0	20	12	8	0	
2010	Sarah Dawson	47	26	21	0	21	11	10	0	
2011	Sarah Dawson	56	17	39	0	21	6	15	0	
2012	Sarah Dawson	58	25	33	0	20	8	12	0	
2013	Mark Montgomery	53	27	26	0	21	11	10	0	
Conference USA
2014	Mark Montgomery	52	19	33	0	23	7	16	0	
2015	Mark Montgomery	50	31	19	0	21	12	9	0	
2016	Mark Montgomery	54	32	22	0	21	12	9	0	
2017	Mark Montgomery	62	38	24	0	24	16	8	0	C-USA Tournament Champions; NCAA Tuscaloosa Regionals Round 2
2018	Mark Montgomery	57	34	23	0	24	15	9	0	
2019	Mark Montgomery	61	45	16	0	24	19	5	0	C-USA Regular Season Champions; C-USA Tournament Champions; NCAA Baton Rouge Regionals

== See also ==
- List of NCAA Division I softball programs
