= Western Collegiate Athletic Association =

Women's athletic conference in the U.S.

The Western Collegiate Athletic Association (WCAA) was a women's-only athletic conference on the West Coast of the United States.

Members competed in the Association for Intercollegiate Athletics for Women (AIAW) until the 1981–82 academic year, then the National Collegiate Athletic Association (NCAA). For its final year in 1985–86, the league was renamed Pacific West Conference; the Pac-10 Conference added women's sports in 1986 and the WCAA was retired.

== Membership ==
- Arizona Wildcats
- Arizona State Sun Devils
- Cal State Fullerton Titans
- Long Beach State 49ers
- San Diego State Aztecs
- Stanford Cardinal
- UCLA Bruins
- USC Trojans

== History ==
The WCAA was founded in 1976 with seven charter members: UCLA, USC, Arizona, Arizona State, Cal State-Fullerton, Long Beach State, and San Diego State. These seven were among the premier programs in many women's sports and were previously independent. The men's teams at these schools competed in three leagues: Pacific-8, WAC, and PCAA. The seven WCAA schools represented the entirety of Division I football schools in southern California and Arizona. The NCAA began sponsoring women's championships in the summer of 1981, and the WCAA moved from the AIAW to the NCAA.

Stanford joined in 1982, and the WCAA had eight members for three years; the PCAA added women's sports in 1985, so Long Beach State and Cal State-Fullerton moved. San Diego State also joined the PCAA for women's sports only (the WAC did not sponsor women's sports until 1990; its parallel league was the "High Country Athletic Conference").

The remaining five members of the WCAA, all Pac-10 schools, competed in the renamed "PacWest Conference" for a final academic year (1985–86); the Pac-10 added women's sports in the summer of 1986. Its other five schools (Washington, Washington State, Oregon, Oregon State, and California) had been members of the Northern Pacific Conference, which was also retired.

Similarly in the west, the Mountain West Athletic Conference (MWAC) was the women's league for the Big Sky Conference until 1988.

== AIAW and DGWS National Champions ==
=== Badminton ===
- Long Beach State: 1970, 74
- Arizona State: 1971, 75, 76, 78, 79, 80, 81
- UCLA: 1977

=== Basketball ===
- Cal State-Fullerton: 1970
- UCLA: 1978

=== Bowling ===
- Arizona State: 1981

=== Fencing ===
- Cal State-Fullerton: 1974

=== Field Hockey ===
- Long Beach State: 1978

=== Golf ===
- Cal State-Fullerton: 1967 (Individual)
- Arizona State: 1969 (Individual), 70 (Individual), 75 (Team)
- San Diego State: 1975 (Individual)

=== Gymnastics ===
- Cal State-Fullerton: 1979

=== Softball ===
- Arizona State: 1972, 73
- UCLA: 1978

=== Swimming & Diving ===
- Arizona State: 1968, 69, 70, 71, 73, 74, 77, 78

=== Synchronized Swimming ===
- Arizona: 1980, 81

=== Tennis ===
- Arizona State: 1971, 72, 74
- USC: 1977, 79, 80
- UCLA: 1981

=== Outdoor Track & Field ===
- UCLA: 1975, 77

=== Volleyball ===
- UCLA: 1971, 74, 75
- Long Beach State: 1972, 73
- USC: 1976, 77, 80

== NCAA National Champions ==
- USC Basketball: 1983, 84
- UCLA Outdoor Track & Field: 1982, 83
- UCLA Softball: 1982, 84, 85
- Cal State-Fullerton softball: 1986
- Stanford Swimming & Diving: 1983
- Stanford tennis: 1982, 84, 86, 87
- USC tennis: 1983, 85
- USC volleyball: 1981
- UCLA volleyball: 1984
