= Seymour Smith Park =

Urban park in Omaha, Nebraska

- Interactive map of Seymour Smith Park
- Type: Public park
- Location: Omaha, Nebraska
- Coordinates: 41°11′43″N 96°1′9″W
- Area: 197 acres (0.80 km^{2})
- Operator: City of Omaha Parks and Recreation Department
- Status: Open all year

Seymour Smith Park is an urban park located at 68th and Harrison Streets in Omaha, Nebraska.

== Facilities ==
The park has recreational athletic facilities including a baseball field, football pitches, disc golf, tennis courts, soccer fields and a recreational skate park. The baseball field hosts American Legion Baseball and the UNO Mavericks. It also features a soap box derby track and a skeet shooting range.

The park is located on the Big Papio Trail.

== History ==
The park was dedicated in January 1971 to honor veteran Omaha lawyer, speaker, and historian Seymour L. Smith. The disc golf course was built in 1994. Seymour Smith Park hosted the first six NCAA Women's College World Series championships from 1982-1987.
