= 2023 Southeastern Louisiana Lady Lions softball team =

American college softball season

2023 Southeastern Louisiana Lady Lions softball
- Conference: Southland Conference
- Record: 47–14 (19–5 Southland)
- Head coach: Rick Fremin (8th season)
- Assistant coaches: Katie Godwin; Alana Fremin
- Home stadium: North Oak Park

2023 Southland Conference softball standings
	Conf.						Overall
Team	W		L		T	PCT	W		L		T	PCT
McNeese ‍†‍‡‍^{y}	21	–	3	–	0	.875	47	–	16	–	0	.746
Southeastern Louisiana ‍‍‍	19	–	5	–	0	.792	47	–	14	–	0	.770
Nicholls ‍‍‍	13	–	11	–	0	.542	29	–	24	–	0	.547
Lamar ‍‍‍	12	–	12	–	0	.500	22	–	34	–	0	.393
Texas A&M–Corpus Christi ‍‍‍	11	–	13	–	0	.458	24	–	24	–	0	.500
Northwestern State ‍‍‍	10	–	14	–	0	.417	25	–	27	–	0	.481
Houston Christian ‍‍‍	9	–	15	–	0	.375	20	–	33	–	0	.377
Incarnate Word ‍‍‍	8	–	16	–	0	.333	16	–	30	–	1	.351
Texas A&M–Commerce* ‍‍‍	5	–	19	–	0	.208	9	–	39	–	0	.188
† – Conference champion ‡ – Tournament champion y – Invited to the NCAA tournament * Ineligible for the 2023 NCAA tournament due to transition from Division II; As of May 21, 2023; Rankings from NFCA/USA Today

The 2023 Southeastern Louisiana Lady Lions softball team represented Southeastern Louisiana University during the 2023 NCAA Division I softball season. The Lady Lions played their home games at North Oak Park in Hammond, LA and were led by eighth-year head coach Rick Fremin. They are members of the Southland Conference.

== Preseason ==
=== Southland Conference Coaches Poll ===
The Southland Conference Coaches Poll was released on January 26, 2023. Southeastern Louisiana was picked to finish second in the Southland Conference with 113 overall votes and 2 first place votes.

Coaches poll
Predicted finish	Team	Votes (1st place)
1	McNeese State	128 (16)
2	Southeastern Louisiana	113 (2)
3	Northwestern State	91
4	Texas A&M–Corpus Christi	85
5	Houston Christian	58
6	Lamar	49
7	Texas A&M–Commerce	47
8	Incarnate Word	45
9	Nicholls	32

=== Preseason All-Southland team ===
Four Lady Lions were named to the conference preseason first team, and one player was named as a second team member.

==== First Team ====
- Crislyne Moreno (MCNS, SO, 1st Base)
- Caleigh Cross (MCNS, SR, 2nd Base)
- Jil Poullard (MCNS, JR, 3rd Base)
- Maddie Watson (SELA, SO, Shortstop)
- Bailey Krolczyk (SELA, JR, Catcher)
- Kaylee Lopez (MCNS, SR, Utility)
- Audrey Greely (SELA, JR, Designated Player)
- Laney Roos (NSU, JR, Outfielder)
- Alayis Seneca (MCNS, SR, Outfielder)
- Cam Goodman (SELA, JR, Outfielder)
- Ashley Vallejo (MCNS, JR, Pitcher)
- Bronte Rhoden (NSU, SR, Pitcher)

==== Second Team ====
- Sydney Hoyt (TAMUCC, JR, 1st Base)
- Madison Rayner (SELA, SR, 2nd Base)
- Haylie Savage (HCU, SO, 3rd Base)
- Ryleigh Mata (UIW, SO, Shortstop)
- Tristin Court (NSU, JR, Catcher)
- Melise Gossen (NICH, SR, Utility)
- Chloe Gomez (MCNS, JR, Designated Player)
- Alexa Poche (NICH, JR, Outfielder)
- Makenzie Chaffin (NSU, JR, Outfielder)
- Bailie Ragsdale (NSU, SO, Outfielder)
- Lyndie Swanson (HCU, JR, Pitcher)
- Siarah Galvan (TAMUCC, SO, Pitcher)

=== National Softball Signing Day ===
Player	Position	Hometown	Previous Team
Chloe Bennett	Pitcher	Rosepine, Louisiana	Rosepine HS; LSU Eunice
Addison Contorno	Outfielder	Livingston, Louisiana	Doyle HS; Copiah–Lincoln CC
Breanna Fontenot	Outfielder	Moss Bluff, Louisiana	Sam Houston HS
Faith Kivett	Utility	Tallulah, Louisiana	Tallulah Academy; Copiah–Lincoln CC
Mykail Lusco	Infielder	Harahan, Louisiana	Dominican HS
Chloe Magee	Infielder	Watson, Louisiana	Live Oak HS
Gabby Mitchell	Utility	Eunice, Louisiana	Eunice HS

== Personnel ==
2023 Southeastern Louisiana Lady Lions softball team
Players
Coaches

#	Pos.	Name	Bats/throws	Height	Year	Home town
0	OF	Cam Goodman	/	5 ft 1 in (1.55 m)	Jr	Marrero, Louisiana
2	U	Madison Rayner	/	5 ft 3 in (1.6 m)	Sr	Stringer, Mississippi
4	INF	Lexi Johnson	/	5 ft 6 in (1.68 m)	Jr	Reserve, Louisiana
6	INF	Madison Hebert	/	5 ft 10 in (1.78 m)	Fr	Luling, Louisiana
7	INF	Maddie Watson	/	5 ft 6 in (1.68 m)	So	Baton Rouge, Louisiana
8	OF	Maddie Leal	/	5 ft 9 in (1.75 m)	Jr	Houston, Texas
9	C	Blaire Bizette	/	5 ft 7 in (1.7 m)	So	New Roads, Louisiana
10	P	Mary-Cathryn Comeaux	/	5 ft 5 in (1.65 m)	Jr	Port Allen, Louisiana
11	INF	Ellie DuBois	/	6 ft 0 in (1.83 m)	Jr	Shreveport, Louisiana
12	OF	Audrey Greely	/	5 ft 9 in (1.75 m)	Jr	Geismar, Louisiana
13	INF	Maria Detillier	/	5 ft 5 in (1.65 m)	Fr	Gramercy, Louisiana
14	P	Cera Blanchard	/	5 ft 7 in (1.7 m)	Jr	Metairie, Louisiana
15	C	Bailey Krolczyk	/	6 ft 0 in (1.83 m)	Jr	Corpus Christi, Texas
17	OF	Jillian Gutierrez	/	5 ft 6 in (1.68 m)	Fr	Pearland, Texas
19	INF	Sadie Hewitt	/	5 ft 5 in (1.65 m)	Jr	Forney, Texas
20	P	Alyssa Romano	/	5 ft 7 in (1.7 m)	Jr	Gonzales, Louisiana
21	P	KK Ladner	/	5 ft 8 in (1.73 m)	Sr	Kiln, Mississippi
23	P	Chyanne Ellett	/	5 ft 7 in (1.7 m)	Jr	Brownwood, Texas
24	P	Leah Marshall	/	5 ft 11 in (1.8 m)	So	Mississauga, Canada
25	U	Britt Bourgoyne	/	5 ft 5 in (1.65 m)	Fr	Port Allen, Louisiana
26	OF	Colleen Kulivan	/	5 ft 7 in (1.7 m)	Fr	Covington, Louisiana
27	P	Lainee Bailey	/	5 ft 8 in (1.73 m)	Fr	Walker, Louisiana
28	C	McKayla Ferguson	/	5 ft 5 in (1.65 m)	Fr	Plaquemine, Louisiana
30	OF	Ka'Lyn Watson	/	5 ft 8 in (1.73 m)	Jr	Missouri City, Texas

Head coach

Rick Fremin (Jackson State)

Assistant coach(es)

Katie Godwin (Southeastern Louisiana)
Alana Fremin (Belhaven)

Legend

- (C) Team captain
- (S) Suspended
- (I) Ineligible
- Injured
- Current redshirt

Roster
Last update: 24 February 2023

== Schedule and results ==
Legend
	Southeastern Louisiana win
	Southeastern Louisiana loss
	Postponement/Cancellation
**Bold**	Southeastern Louisiana team member
*	Non-Conference game
†	Make-Up Game

2023 Southeastern Louisiana Lady Lions softball game log
Regular season (47–14)

February (12–2)
Date	Opponent	Rank	Site/stadium	Score	Win	Loss	Save	TV	Attendance	Overall record	SLC record
2023 Lion Classic
Feb. 10	Missouri State*		North Oak Park • Hammond, LA	**W** 2–1	**Blanchard, Cera (1-0)**	McKenzie Vaughan (0-1)	None	ESPN+	210	1–0	
Feb. 12	Missouri State*		North Oak Park • Hammond, LA	**W** 7–1	**Ellett, Chyanne (1-0)**	Mackenzie Chacon (0-1)	None	ESPN+	182	2–0	
Feb. 12	Missouri State*		North Oak Park • Hammond, LA	**W** 8–0	**Blanchard, Cera (2-0)**	Shelby Houchlei (0-1)	None	ESPN+	225	3–0	
Feb. 15	Louisiana Tech*		North Oak Park • Hammond, LA	**W** 5–4	**Ladner, KK (1-0)**	MELNYCHUK, Brook (1-1)	None	ESPN+	304	4–0	
2023 Mardi Gras Mambo
Feb. 17	vs. Manhattan*		Youngsville Sports Complex • Youngsville, LA	**W** 10–0	**Comeaux, Mary-Cathryn (MC) (1-0)**	DEEMER, Marika (0-1)	None		100	5–0	
Feb. 17	vs. Toledo*		Youngsville Sports Complex • Youngsville, LA	**W** 10–0	**Blanchard, Cera (3-0)**	KNIGHT, Sophia (1-2)	None		100	6–0	
Feb. 18	vs. Gardner–Webb*		Youngsville Sports Complex • Youngsville, LA	**W** 3–2	**Blanchard, Cera (4-0)**	KNIGHT, Sophia (1-2)	None		100	7–0	
Feb. 18	vs. St. Thomas*		Youngsville Sports Complex • Youngsville, LA	**W** 10–2	**Comeaux, Mary-Cathryn (MC) (2-0)**	Keira Murphy (0-0)	**Blanchard, Cera (1)**		100	8–0	
Feb. 19	vs. Florida A&M*		Youngsville Sports Complex • Youngsville, LA	**W** 9–0	**Marshall, Leah (1-0)**	Nadia Zenteno (1-3)	None		118	9–0	
Easton Bama Bash
Feb. 24	vs. Indiana State*		Rhoads Stadium • Tuscaloosa, AL	**W** 1–0	**Blanchard, Cera (5-0)**	Newbanks, Cassi (0-3)	None			10–0	
Feb. 24	at Alabama*	7	Rhoads Stadium • Tuscaloosa, AL	**L** 2–6	Montana Fouts (5-1)	**Ladner, KK (1-1)**	None	SECN+	3,940	10–1	
Feb. 25	at Alabama*		Rhoads Stadium • Tuscaloosa, AL	**L** 0–11	Montana Fourts (6-1)	**Ellett, Chyanne (1-1)**	None	SECN+		10–2	
Feb. 25	vs. Kennesaw State*		Rhoads Stadium • Tuscaloosa, AL	**W** 7–1	**Blanchard, Cera (6-0)**	KYTE (1-4)	None			11–2	
Feb. 26	vs. Indiana State*		Rhoads Stadium • Tuscaloosa, AL	**W** 6–2	**Ladner, KK (2-0)**	Sackett, Lauren (2-2)	None			12–2	

March (17–6)
Date	Opponent	Rank	Site/stadium	Score	Win	Loss	Save	TV	Attendance	Overall record	SLC record
Mar. 1	at Florida A&M*		Lady Rattler Softball Complex • Tallahassee, FL	**W** 10–4	**Comeaux, Mary-Cathryn (MC) (3–0)**	Lauryn Peppers (1–5)	**Bailey, Lainee (1)**		126	13–2	
The Spring Games
Mar. 3	vs. Albany*		R.O.C. Park • Madeira Beach, FL	**W** 8–0	**Ladner, KK (3–1)**	Freitas, Amelia (0–2)	None	FloSports		14–2	
Mar. 3	vs. Georgetown*		R.O.C. Park • Madeira Beach, FL	**W** 10–8	**Cera Blanchard (7–0)**	Julia Parker (0–0)	None	FloSports		15–2	
Mar. 4	vs. Central Michigan*		R.O.C. Park • Madeira Beach, FL	**W** 3–1	**Ladner, KK (8–1)**	Lehto (3–5)	None		150	16–2	
Mar. 4	vs. Yale*		R.O.C. Park • Madeira Beach, FL	**W** 6–4	**Blanchard, Cera (3–1)**	Nicole Conway (1–1)	**Comeaux, Mary-Cathryn (MC) (1)**		98	17–2	
Mar. 5	vs. LIU*		R.O.C. Park • Madeira Beach, FL	**W** 7–3	**Ladner, KK (5–1)**	COWANS, Lindsey (3–5)	None		75	18–2	
Mar. 8	at Southern Miss*		Southern Miss Softball Complex • Hattiesburg, MS	**W** 7–1	**Blanchard, Cera (9–0)**	Morgan Leinstock (8–4)	None	ESPN+	723	19–2	
Bulldog Invitational
Mar. 9	at Mississippi State*		MSU Softball Field • Starkville, MS	**L** 5–6	Kenley Hawk (2–3)	**Blanchard, Cera (9–1)**	None	SECN+	354	19–3	
Mar. 10	vs. Omaha*		MSU Softball Field • Starkville, MS	**L** 2–3	Meyer (4–3)	**Blanchard, Cera (9–2)**	None		215	19–4	
Mar. 10	vs. Oklahoma*	1	MSU Softball Field • Starkville, MS	**L** 0–13 (5 inn)	Bahl, J. (6–1)	**Comeaux, Mary-Cathryn (MC) (3–1)**	None		278	19–5	
Mar. 11	vs. East Tennessee State*		MSU Softball Field • Starkville, MS	**W** 7–2	**Romano, Alyssa (1–0)**	T. Suchy (0–2)	None		228	20–5	
Mar. 15	LSU*	12	North Oak Park • Hammond, LA	**L** 1–11 (6 inn)	Alea Johnson (5–0)	**Blanchard, Cera (9–3)**	None	ESPN+	1,137	20–6	
Mar. 17	at Lamar		Lamar Softball Complex • Beaumont, TX	**W** 6–2	**Ladner, KK (1–0)**	Niedenthal, Cameron (2–3)	None	ESPN+	422	21–6	1–0
Mar. 17	at Lamar		Lamar Softball Complex • Beaumont, TX	**W** 14–7	**Blanchard, Cera (10–3)**	Ruiz, Aaliyah (3–7)	None	ESPN+	422	22–6	2–0
Mar. 18	at Lamar		Lamar Softball Complex • Beaumont, TX	**L** 2–6	Ruiz, Aaliyah (4–7)	**Comeaux, Mary-Cathryn (MC) (3–2)**	None	ESPN+	402	22–7	2–1
Mar. 22	Louisiana–Monroe*		North Oak Park • Hammond, LA	**W** 4–2	**Ladner, KK (7–1)**	Hulett, Gianni (7–3)	None	ESPN+	245	23–7	
Mar. 24	Texas A&M–Corpus Christi		North Oak Park • Hammond, LA	**W** 5–2	**Ladner, KK (8–1)**	Aholelei, Primrose (9–8)	**DuBois, Ellie (1)**	ESPN+	215	24–7	3–1
Mar. 24	Texas A&M–Corpus Christi		North Oak Park • Hammond, LA	**W** 7–3	**Comeaux, Mary-Cathryn (MC) (4–2)**	Saenz, Ariella (0–1)	None	ESPN+	215	25–7	4–1
Mar. 25	Texas A&M–Corpus Christi		North Oak Park • Hammond, LA	**L** 1–4	Aholelei, Primrose (10-8)	**Blanchard, Cera (10-4)**	None	ESPN+	145	25–8	4–2
Mar. 28	at Alcorn State*		ASU Softball Park • Alcorn State, MS	5–3	**Comeaux, Mary-Cathryn (MC) (5-2)**	Veamoi, Alexa (2-7)	**Blanchard, Cera (2)**		87	26–8	
Mar. 28	at Alcorn State*		ASU Softball Park • Alcorn State, MS	13–4 (5 inn)	**Ellett, Chyanne (2-1)**	Parker, Kiri (3-7)			87	27–8	
Mar. 31	Texas A&M-Commerce		North Oak Park • Hammond, LA	3–0	**Blanchard, Cera (11-4)**	Sanchez, Julia (3-8)	**DuBois, Ellie (2)**	ESPN+	146	28–8	5–2
Mar. 31	Texas A&M-Commerce		North Oak Park • Hammond, LA	8–0	**Comeaux, Mary-Cathryn (MC)** (6-2)	Meadors, McKenna (0-6)		ESPN+	146	29–8	6–2

April (12–4)
Date	Opponent	Rank	Site/stadium	Score	Win	Loss	Save	TV	Attendance	Overall record	SLC record
Apr. 1	Texas A&M-Commerce		North Oak Park • Hammond, LA	2–10 (6 inn)	**Ladner, KK (9-1)**	Arredondo, Anissa (2-10)		ESPN+	146	30–8	7–2
Apr. 4	at Jackson State*		Jackson State University Softball Stadium • Jackson, MS	4–0	**Comeaux, Mary-Cathryn (MC) (7-2)**	Brooklyn Morris (0-2)			100	31–8	
Apr. 4	at Jackson State*		Jackson State University Softball Stadium • Jackson, MS	12–0 (5 inn)	**Blanchard, Cera (12-4)**	Macie Kuppenbender (3-4)			100	32–8	
Apr. 7	at Incarnate Word		H-E-B Field • San Antonio, TX	12–8	**Ladner, KK (0-0)**	GUNTHER, A (0-0)		ESPN+	57	33–8	8–2
Apr. 7	at Incarnate Word		H-E-B Field • San Antonio, TX	10–7	**Blanchard, Cera (0-0)**	GARCIA, A (0-0)	**Comeaux, Mary-Cathryn (MC) (0)**	ESPN+	120	34–8	9–2
Apr. 8	at Incarnate Word		H-E-B Field • San Antonio, TX	3–2	**Comeaux, Mary-Cathryn (MC) (8-2)**	GUNTHER, A (1-3)		ESPN+	156	35–8	10–2
Apr. 14	at Houston Christian		Husky Field • Houston, TX	6–3	**Ladner, KK (11-1)**	Janes, Katy (6-9)	**Comeaux, Mary-Cathryn (MC) (2)**	ESPN+	250	36–8	11–2
Apr. 14	at Houston Christian		Husky Field • Houston, TX	8–0 (5 inn)	**Blanchard, Cera (14-4)**	Swanson, Lyndie (8-6)		ESPN+	250	37–8	12–2
Apr. 15	at Houston Christian		Husky Field • Houston, TX	3–4	Grofman, Ronni (5-2)	**Blanchard, Cera (14-5)**			250	37–9	12–3
Apr. 18	at Louisiana*		Yvette Girouard Field at Lamson Park • Lafayette, LA	0–7	Lamb, Kandra (6-1)	**Comeaux, Mary-Cathryn (MC) (8-3)**		ESPN+	1,388	37–10	
Apr. 21	Nicholls		North Oak Park • Hammond, LA	2–8	McNeill, Audrey (10-8)	**Blanchard, Cera (14-6)**	VandenBout, Molly (1)	ESPN+	219	37–11	12–4
Apr. 21	Nicholls		North Oak Park • Hammond, LA	5–4	**Ladner, KK (12-1)**	Yoo, Molly (10-9)		ESPN+	276	38–11	13–4
Apr. 22	Nicholls		North Oak Park • Hammond, LA	8–4	**Ladner, KK (13-1)**	Yoo, Molly (10-10)		ESPN+	302	39–11	14–4
Apr. 25	McNeese		North Oak Park • Hammond, LA	4–1	**Blanchard, Cera (15-6)**	Vallejo, Ashley (13-8)		ESPN+	262	40–11	15–4
Apr. 25	McNeese		North Oak Park • Hammond, LA	4–3	**Ladner, KK (14-1)**	Tate, Whitney (13-4)		ESPN+	262	41–11	16–4
Apr. 26	McNeese		North Oak Park • Hammond, LA	1–2	Vallejo, Ashley (14-8)	**Comeaux, Mary-Cathryn (MC) (8-4)**	Sanders, Shaelyn (1)	ESPN+	263	41–12	16–5

May (3–0)
Date	Opponent	Rank	Site/stadium	Score	Win	Loss	Save	TV	Attendance	Overall record	SLC record
May. 5	at Northwestern State		Lady Demon Diamond • Natchitoches, LA	7–5	**DuBois, Ellie (1-0)**	Denton, Ryleigh (4-5)		ESPN+	206	42–12	17–5
May. 5	at Northwestern State		Lady Demon Diamond • Natchitoches, LA	3–0	**Blanchard, Cera (16-6)**	Seely, Kenzie (6-7)		ESPN+	208	43–12	18–5
May. 6	at Northwestern State		Lady Demon Diamond • Natchitoches, LA	7–1	**DuBois, Ellie (2-0)**	Rhoden, Bronte (2-4)	**Comeaux, Mary-Cathryn (MC) (4)**	ESPN+	185	44–12	19–5

Post-Season (3–2)

Southland Tournament (3–2)
Date	Opponent	(Seed)/Rank	Site/stadium	Score	Win	Loss	Save	TV	Attendance	Overall record	Tournament record
May 9	vs. (7) Houston Christian	(2)	Joe Miller Field at Cowgirl Diamond • Lake Charles, LA	7–1	**Blanchard, Cera (17-6)**	Swanson, Lyndie (9-10)		ESPN+		45–12	1–0
May 10	vs. (6) Northwestern State	(2)	Joe Miller Field at Cowgirl Diamond • Lake Charles, LA	13–1 (5 inn)	**Ladner, KK (15-1)**	Seely, Kenzie (7-8)		ESPN+	394	46–12	2–0
May 11	vs. (1) McNeese	(2)	Joe Miller Field at Cowgirl Diamond • Lake Charles, LA	2–6	Vallejo, Ashley (17-8)	**Blanchard, Cera (17-7)**		ESPN+	528	46–13	2–1
May 12	vs. (4) Lamar	(2)	Joe Miller Field at Cowgirl Diamond • Lake Charles, LA	8–0 (5 inn)	**DuBois, Ellie (3-0)**	Ruiz, Aaliyah (15-13)		ESPN+	363	47–13	3–1
May 13	vs. (1) McNeese	(2)	Joe Miller Field at Cowgirl Diamond • Lake Charles, LA	0–1	Vallejo, Ashley (18-8)	**Ladner, KK (15-2)**		ESPN+	607	47–14	3–2

Schedule source:*Rankings are based on the team's current ranking in the NFCA/USA Softball poll.
