= 2023 McNeese Cowgirls softball team =

American college softball season

2023 McNeese Cowgirls softball

Southland Tournament champion

NCAA Tournament, Runner-up, Seattle Regional
- Conference: Southland Conference
- Record: 47–16 (21–3 Southland)
- Head coach: James Landreneau (7th season)
- Assistant coaches: Shellie Landry; Shelby Sunseri
- Home stadium: Joe Miller Field at Cowgirl Diamond

2023 Southland Conference softball standings
	Conf.						Overall
Team	W		L		T	PCT	W		L		T	PCT
McNeese ‍†‍‡‍^{y}	21	–	3	–	0	.875	47	–	16	–	0	.746
Southeastern Louisiana ‍‍‍	19	–	5	–	0	.792	47	–	14	–	0	.770
Nicholls ‍‍‍	13	–	11	–	0	.542	29	–	24	–	0	.547
Lamar ‍‍‍	12	–	12	–	0	.500	22	–	34	–	0	.393
Texas A&M–Corpus Christi ‍‍‍	11	–	13	–	0	.458	24	–	24	–	0	.500
Northwestern State ‍‍‍	10	–	14	–	0	.417	25	–	27	–	0	.481
Houston Christian ‍‍‍	9	–	15	–	0	.375	20	–	33	–	0	.377
Incarnate Word ‍‍‍	8	–	16	–	0	.333	16	–	30	–	1	.351
Texas A&M–Commerce* ‍‍‍	5	–	19	–	0	.208	9	–	39	–	0	.188
† – Conference champion ‡ – Tournament champion y – Invited to the NCAA tournament * Ineligible for the 2023 NCAA tournament due to transition from Division II; As of May 21, 2023; Rankings from NFCA/USA Today

The 2023 McNeese Cowgirls softball team represented McNeese State University during the 2023 NCAA Division I softball season. The Cowgirls played their home games at Joe Miller Field at Cowgirl Diamond and were led by seventh-year head coach James Landreneau. They are members of the Southland Conference. McNeese had a regular season record of 41–14 and a conference record of 21–3 winning the Southland Conference regular season championship. They also won the 2023 Southland Conference softball tournament as the first seeded team.

The Cowgirls won the SLC autobid to the 2023 NCAA Division I softball tournament. They were runner-up to the Seattle Regional championship compiling a tournament record of 3–2. Leading the regional championship game 6–0 through the sixth inning, the Cowgirls' season ended ultimately losing to the tournament hosts, # 7 ranked Washington Huskies 7-6. The Cowgirls' final overall record was 47–16.

== Preseason ==
=== Southland Conference Coaches Poll ===
The Southland Conference Coaches Poll was released on January 26, 2023. McNeese was picked to finish first in the Southland Conference with 128 votes and 16 first place votes.

Coaches poll
Predicted finish	Team	Votes (1st place)
1	McNeese	128 (16)
2	Southeastern Louisiana	113 (2)
3	Northwestern State	91
4	Texas A&M–Corpus Christi	85
5	Houston Christian	58
6	Lamar	49
7	Texas A&M–Commerce	47
8	Incarnate Word	45
9	Nicholls	32

=== Preseason All-Southland team ===
McNeese had six players named to the Southland Conference preseason first team and one player was named to the preseason second team.

==== First Team ====
- Crislyne Moreno (MCNS, SO, 1st Base)
- Caleigh Cross (MCNS, SR, 2nd Base)
- Jil Poullard (MCNS, JR, 3rd Base)
- Maddie Watson (SELA, SO, Shortstop)
- Bailey Krolczyk (SELA, JR, Catcher)
- Kaylee Lopez (MCNS, SR, Utility)
- Audrey Greely (SELA, JR, Designated Player)
- Laney Roos (NSU, JR, Outfielder)
- Alayis Seneca (MCNS, SR, Outfielder)
- Cam Goodman (SELA, JR, Outfielder)
- Ashley Vallejo (MCNS, JR, Pitcher)
- Bronte Rhoden (NSU, SR, Pitcher)

==== Second Team ====
- Sydney Hoyt (TAMUCC, JR, 1st Base)
- Madison Rayner (SELA, SR, 2nd Base)
- Haylie Savage (HCU, SO, 3rd Base)
- Ryleigh Mata (UIW, SO, Shortstop)
- Tristin Court (NSU, JR, Catcher)
- Melise Gossen (NICH, SR, Utility)
- Chloe Gomez (MCNS, JR, Designated Player)
- Alexa Poche (NICH, JR, Outfielder)
- Makenzie Chaffin (NSU, JR, Outfielder)
- Bailie Ragsdale (NSU, SO, Outfielder)
- Lyndie Swanson (HCU, JR, Pitcher)
- Siarah Galvan (TAMUCC, SO, Pitcher)

== Roster ==
2023 McNeese Cowgirls softball team
Players
Coaches

#	Pos.	Name	Bats/throws	Height	Year	Home town
1	INF	Jada Munoz	R/R	5 ft 6 in (1.68 m)	Fr	San Antonio, Texas
2	INF	Brook Otto	R/R	5 ft 6 in (1.68 m)	Fr	Smithville, Texas
3	RHP	Ashley Vallejo	R/R	5 ft 7 in (1.7 m)	Jr	New Waverly, Texas
4	OF	Kaylee Lopez	L/L	5 ft 5 in (1.65 m)	Sr	Indian Bayou, Louisiana
5	RHP	Whitney Tate	L/R	5 ft 7 in (1.7 m)	Jr	Columbia, Louisiana
6	OF	Erin Ardoin	L/R	5 ft 6 in (1.68 m)	So	Moss Bluff, Louisiana
7	OF	Rylee Eyster	L/R	5 ft 3 in (1.6 m)	Fr	Southaven, Mississippi
8	U	Grace Janik	R/R	5 ft 9 in (1.75 m)	Fr	Missouri City, Texas
9	RHP	Lindsey Davis	R/R	5 ft 8 in (1.73 m)	Fr	Troup, Texas
11	LHP	Ryann Schexnayder	L/L	5 ft 8 in (1.73 m)	Fr	Walker, Louisiana
12	INF	Mariana Torres	R/R	5 ft 8 in (1.73 m)	So	Pflugerville, Texas
14	INF	Crislyne Moreno	R/R	5 ft 8 in (1.73 m)	So	Converse, Texas
15	U	Makynlie Jones	R/R	5 ft 9 in (1.75 m)	Fr	Vardaman, Mississippi
17	OF	Delaney Dunham	L/L	5 ft 6 in (1.68 m)	Fr	Mont Belvieu, Texas
18	OF	Kiley Dehart	L/R	5 ft 9 in (1.75 m)	So	Lake Charles, Louisiana
19	U	Corine Poncho	R/R	5 ft 8 in (1.73 m)	Fr	Basile, Louisiana
21	U	Jil Poullard	L/R	5 ft 5 in (1.65 m)	Jr	Moss Bluff, Louisiana
22	INF	Reese Reyna	R/R	5 ft 3 in (1.6 m)	So	Santa Fe, Texas
23		Caleigh Cross	L/R	5 ft 8 in (1.73 m)	Sr	Forney, Texas
24	LHP	Shaelyn Sanders	R/L	5 ft 6 in (1.68 m)	Jr	Splendora, Texas
25	C	Chloe Gomez	R/R	5 ft 2 in (1.57 m)	Jr	Spring, Texas
26	C	Kelsey Gaspard (redshirt)	R/R	5 ft 5 in (1.65 m)	Fr	Roanoke, Louisiana
28	OF	Alayis Seneca	L/R	5 ft 8 in (1.73 m)	Sr	The Woodlands, Texas
32	INF	Rylie Bouvier	L/R	5 ft 7 in (1.7 m)	So	Santa Fe, Texas
34	C	Emily Phillips	R/R	5 ft 9 in (1.75 m)	Jr	Chesapeake, Virginia

Head coach

James Landreneau (McNeese State)

Assistant coach(es)

Shellie Landry (Louisiana)
Alyssa Denham (Arizona)
Shelbi Sunseri (LSU)

Legend

- (C) Team captain
- (S) Suspended
- (I) Ineligible
- Injured
- Current redshirt

Roster
Last update: December 23, 2022

== Schedule and results ==
Legend
	McNeese win
	McNeese loss
	Postponement/Cancellation
**Bold**	McNeese team member
*	Non-Conference game
†	Make-Up Game

2023 McNeese Cowgirls softball game log
Regular season (47–16)

February (10–5)
Date	Opponent	Rank	Site/stadium	Score	Win	Loss	Save	TV	Attendance	Overall record	SLC record
Cowgirl Classic I
Feb. 10	Idaho State*		Joe Miller Field at Cowgirl Diamond • Lake Charles, LA	7–2	**Tate** (1-0)	McMurray (0-1)				1–0	
Feb. 10	Texas Southern*		Joe Miller Field at Cowgirl Diamond • Lake Charles, LA	6–1	**Sanders** (1-0)	Gonzales (0-1)			689	2–0	
Feb. 11	Texas Southern*		Joe Miller Field at Cowgirl Diamond • Lake Charles, LA	8–0 (5 inn)	**Davis** (1-0)	Gendorf (0-0)				3–0	
Feb. 11	Central Arkansas*		Joe Miller Field at Cowgirl Diamond • Lake Charles, LA	1–2	Johnson (0-0)	**Vallejo** (0-1)	Beaver (0)		639	3–1	
Feb. 12	UAB*		Joe Miller Field at Cowgirl Diamond • Lake Charles, LA	4–2	**Tate** (0-0)	Cespedes (0-0)	**Vallejo** (0)		584	4–1	
Tracy Beard College Classic
Feb. 17	vs. Kentucky*	15	Old Celina Park • Celina, TX	0–4	Schoonover (2-0)	**Vallejo** (0-2)				4–2	
Feb. 18	vs. South Dakota*		Old Celina Park • Celina, TX	4–1	**Sanders** (2-0)	Edwards (0-2)	**Davis** (1)			5–2	
Feb. 18	vs. UT Arlington*		Old Celina Park • Celina, TX	8–0 (5 inn)	**Tate** (3-0)	Waiters (1-1)				6–2	
Feb. 19	vs. North Texas*	22	Old Celina Park • Celina, TX	4–2	**Vallejo** (1-2)	Peters (3-2)				7–2	
Feb. 20	Washington*	12	Joe Miller Field at Cowgirl Diamond • Lake Charles, LA	4–2	**Tate** (4-0)	Lynch (0-1)			707	8–2	
Feb. 21	South Alabama*		Joe Miller Field at Cowgirl Diamond • Lake Charles, LA	0–3	Lackie (1-2)	**Vallejo** (1-3)			621	8–3	
Cowgirl Classic II
Feb. 24	Stephen F. Austin*		Joe Miller Field at Cowgirl Diamond • Lake Charles, LA	4–3	**Davis** (2-0)	Gainous (1-2)			757	9–3	
Feb. 25	Stephen F. Austin*		Joe Miller Field at Cowgirl Diamond • Lake Charles, LA	5–4	**Vallejo** (2-3)	Gainous (1-3)				10–3	
Feb. 25	Ole Miss*		Joe Miller Field at Cowgirl Diamond • Lake Charles, LA	2–8	Furbush (4-1)	**Vallejo** (2-4)	Kliethermes (1)		945	10–4	
Feb. 26	Ole Miss*		Joe Miller Field at Cowgirl Diamond • Lake Charles, LA	2–7	Kliethermes (3-2)	**Davis** (2-1)			807	10–5	

March (15–5)
Date	Opponent	Rank	Site/stadium	Score	Win	Loss	Save	TV	Attendance	Overall record	SLC record
Mar. 1	at Grambling*		Joe Miller Field at Cowgirl Diamond • Lake Charles, LA	8–0 (5 inn)	**Vallejo** (3-4)	Richard (2-2)				11–5	
Longhorn Invitational
Mar. 3	vs. Princeton*		Red and Charline McCombs Field • Austin, TX	1–0	**Vallejo** (4-4)	Laudenslager (1-2)				12–5	
Mar. 3	vs. Louisiana*		Red and Charline McCombs Field • Austin, TX	1–7	Landry (5-4)	**Tate** (4-1)				12–6	
Mar. 4	vs. Tennessee Tech*		Red and Charline McCombs Field • Austin, TX	8–0	**Tate** (5-1)	Manus (7-5)				13–6	
Mar. 4	at Texas*	9	Red and Charline McCombs Field • Austin, TX	0–4				LHN	1,673	13–7	
Mar. 8	at Louisiana*		Yvette Girouard Field at Lamson Park • Lafayette, LA	2–6	Riassetto (1-1)	**Vallejo** (4-6)			1,522	13–8	
Mar. 10	at Louisiana–Monroe*		Geo-Surfaces Field at the ULM Softball Complex • Monroe, LA	6–0	**Tate** (6-1)	Abrams (2-3)			750	14–8	
Mar. 11	at Louisiana–Monroe*		Geo-Surfaces Field at the ULM Softball Complex • Monroe, LA	1–8	Hulett, Gianni (7-1)	**Vallejo** (4-7)				14–9	
Mar. 11	at Louisiana–Monroe*		Geo-Surfaces Field at the ULM Softball Complex • Monroe, LA	2–1	**Tate** (7-1)	Hulett (7-2)	**Davis** (2)		568	15–9	
Mar. 15	Houston*		Joe Miller Field at Cowgirl Diamond • Lake Charles, LA	9–1 (5 inn)	**Davis** (3-1)	Boyd (0-3)			683	16–9	
Mar. 17	at Incarnate Word		H-E-B Field • San Antonio, TX	9–0 (5 inn)	**Tate** (8-1)	Garcia (3-5)		ESPN+	78	17–9	1–0
Mar. 17	at Incarnate Word		H-E-B Field • San Antonio, TX	5–1	**Vallejo** (5-7)	Gunther (4-3)		ESPN+	167	18–9	2–0
Mar. 18	at Incarnate Word		H-E-B Field • San Antonio, TX	10–0	**Tate** (9-1)	Floyd (1-5)		ESPN+	142	19–9	3–0
Mar. 21	at LSU*	10	Tiger Park • Baton Rouge, LA	2–6	Chaffin (3-1)	**Tate** (9-2)		SECN+	1,802	19–10	
Mar. 24	Texas A&M–Commerce		Joe Miller Field at Cowgirl Diamond • Lake Charles, LA	9–0 (5 inn)	**Tate** (10-2)	Sanchez (3-7)			708	20–10	4–0
Mar. 25	Texas A&M–Commerce		Joe Miller Field at Cowgirl Diamond • Lake Charles, LA	8–0 (5 inn)	**Vallejo** (6-7)	Meadors (0-5)		ESPN+		21–10	5–0
Mar. 25	Texas A&M–Commerce		Joe Miller Field at Cowgirl Diamond • Lake Charles, LA	1–0	**Sanders** (3-0)	Arredondo (2-9)		ESPN+	787	22–10	6–0
Mar. 29	at Sam Houston*		Bearkat Softball Complex • Huntsville, TX	2–0	**Tate** (11-2)	Guindon (4-5)			485	23–10	
Mar. 31	at Lamar		Lamar Softball Complex • Beaumont, TX	7–4	**Vallejo** (7-7)	Mitchell (4-10)	**Tate** (1)	ESPN+	410	23–10	7–0
Mar. 31	at Lamar		Lamar Softball Complex • Beaumont, TX	4–2	**Sanders** (4-0)	Ruiz (4-8)	**Davis, Lindsay** (3)	ESPN+	394	24–10	8–0

April (13–4)
Date	Opponent	Rank	Site/stadium	Score	Win	Loss	Save	TV	Attendance	Overall record	SLC record
Apr. 1	at Lamar		Lamar Softball Complex • Beaumont, TX	12–0 (5 inn)	**Tate** (12-2)	Niedenthal (2-5)		ESPN+	455	26–10	9–0
Apr. 4	Louisiana*		Joe Miller Field at Cowgirl Diamond • Lake Charles, LA	0–7	Landry, S (9-4)	**Tate** (12-3)		ESPN+	837	26–11	
Apr. 7	Northwestern State		Joe Miller Field at Cowgirl Diamond • Lake Charles, LA	6–7	Darr (10-5)	**Davis** (3-2)				26–12	9–1
Apr. 7	Northwestern State		Joe Miller Field at Cowgirl Diamond • Lake Charles, LA	4–0	**Vallejo** (8-7)	Seely (4-5)		ESPN+	687	27–12	10–1
Apr. 8	Northwestern State		Joe Miller Field at Cowgirl Diamond • Lake Charles, LA	2–0	**Vallejo** (9-7)	Darr (10-6)	**Davis** (4)	ESPN+	707	28–12	11–1
Apr. 11	at Houston*		Cougar Softball Stadium • Houston, TX	4–2 (10 inn)	**Vallejo** (10-7)	Wilkey (13-8)		ESPN+	376	29–12	
Apr. 14	Nicholls		Joe Miller Field at Cowgirl Diamond • Lake Charles, LA	6–0	**Vallejo** (11-7)	McNeill (9-8)		ESPN+		30–12	12–1
Apr. 15	Nicholls		Joe Miller Field at Cowgirl Diamond • Lake Charles, LA	8–0 (6 inn)	**Tate** (13-3)	Yoo (10-7)		ESPN+	807	31–12	13–1
Apr. 15	Nicholls		Joe Miller Field at Cowgirl Diamond • Lake Charles, LA	5–4	**Vallejo** (12-7)	Yoo (10-8)		ESPN+	787	32–12	14–1
Apr. 18	LSU*	15	Joe Miller Field at Cowgirl Diamond • Lake Charles, LA	4–3	'Vallejo (13-7)	Berzon (12-5)		ESPN+	1,488	33–12	
Apr. 19	UT Arlington*		Joe Miller Field at Cowgirl Diamond • Lake Charles, LA	6–2	**Sanders** (5-0)	Bumpurs (6-8)		ESPN+	697	34–12	
Apr. 25	at Southeastern		North Oak Park • Hammond, LA	1–4	Blanchard (15-6)	**Vallejo** (13-8)		ESPN+	262	34–13	14–2
Apr. 25	at Southeastern		North Oak Park • Hammond, LA	3–4	Ladner, KK (14-1)	**Tate** (13-4)		ESPN+	262	34–14	14–3
Apr. 26	at Southeastern		North Oak Park • Hammond, LA	2–1	**Vallejo** (14-8)	Comeaux (8-4)	**Sanders** (1)	ESPN+	263	35–14	15–3
Apr. 28	Texas A&M–Corpus Christi		Joe Miller Field at Cowgirl Diamond • Lake Charles, LA	4–3	**Sanders** (6-0)	Aholelei (16-11)		ESPN+	827	36–14	16–3
Apr. 28	Texas A&M–Corpus Christi		Joe Miller Field at Cowgirl Diamond • Lake Charles, LA	7–2	**Vallejo** (15-8)	Hoyt (2-5)		ESPN+		37–14	17–3
Apr. 29	Texas A&M–Corpus Christi		Joe Miller Field at Cowgirl Diamond • Lake Charles, LA	5–2	**Tate** (14-4)	Aholelei (16-12)		ESPN+	802	38–14	18–3

May (3–0)
Date	Opponent	Rank	Site/stadium	Score	Win	Loss	Save	TV	Attendance	Overall record	SLC record
May. 5	at Houston Christian		Husky Field • Houston, TX	4–0	**Vallejo** (16-8)	Janes (6-12)		ESPN+	225	39–14	19–3
May. 5	at Houston Christian		Husky Field • Houston, TX	5–0	**Tate** (15-4)	Swanson (9-9)		ESPN+	225	40–14	20–3
May. 6	at Houston Christian		Husky Field • Houston, TX	1–0	**Sanders** (7-0)	Grofman (5-5)		ESPN+	225	41–14	21–3

Post-Season (6–2)

Southland Tournament (3–0)
Date	Opponent	(Seed)/Rank	Site/stadium	Score	Win	Loss	Save	TV	Attendance	Overall record	Tournament record
May 10	vs. (5) Texas A&M–Corpus Christi	(1)	Joe Miller Field at Cowgirl Diamond • Lake Charles, LA	2–1	**Tate** (16-4)	Aholelei (16-4)		ESPN+		42–14	1–0
May 11	vs. (2) Southeastern Louisiana	(1)	Joe Miller Field at Cowgirl Diamond • Lake Charles, LA	6–2	**Vallejo** (17-8)	Blanchard (17-7)			ESPN+	43–14	2–0
May 13	vs. (2) Southeastern Louisiana	(1)	Joe Miller Field at Cowgirl Diamond • Lake Charles, LA	1–0 ^{(8)}	**Vallejo** (18-8)	Ladner (15-2)		ESPN+	607	44–14	3–0

NCAA Tournament (3–2)
Date	Opponent	(Seed)/Rank	Site/stadium	Score	Win	Loss	Save	TV	Attendance	Overall record	Tournament record
May 19	vs. Minnesota		Husky Softball Stadium • Seattle, WA	5–4 (13 inn)	**Tate, Whitney (17-4)**	Sydney Schwartz (2-2)		ESPN+		45–14	1–0
May 20	at Washington	7	Husky Softball Stadium • Seattle, WA	1–3	Ruby Meylan (17-5)	Sanders, Shaelyn (7-1)		ESPNU		45–15	1–1
May 20	vs. Minnesota		Husky Softball Stadium • Seattle, WA	1–0	**Vallejo, Ashley (19-8)**	Jacie Hambrick (7-7)		ESPN+		46–15	2–1
May 21	at Washington	7	Husky Softball Stadium • Seattle, WA	1–0	**Tate, Whitney (18-4)**	Kelley Lynch (9-3)		ESPN+		47–15	3–1
May 21	at Washington	7	Husky Softball Stadium • Seattle, WA	6–7	Brooke Nelson (3-2)	**Vallejo, Ashley (19-9)**		ESPNU		47–16	3–2

Schedule source:*Rankings are based on the team's current ranking in the NFCA/USA Softball poll.
