= 2023 Texas A&M–Commerce Lions softball team =

Texas A&M–Commerce Lions softball team

2023 Texas A&M–Commerce Lions softball
- Conference: Southland Conference
- Record: 9–39 (5–19 Southland)
- Head coach: Brittany Miller (1st season)
- Assistant coach: Crystl Bustos
- Home stadium: John Cain Family Softball Complex

2023 Southland Conference softball standings
	Conf.						Overall
Team	W		L		T	PCT	W		L		T	PCT
McNeese ‍†‍‡‍^{y}	21	–	3	–	0	.875	47	–	16	–	0	.746
Southeastern Louisiana ‍‍‍	19	–	5	–	0	.792	47	–	14	–	0	.770
Nicholls ‍‍‍	13	–	11	–	0	.542	29	–	24	–	0	.547
Lamar ‍‍‍	12	–	12	–	0	.500	22	–	34	–	0	.393
Texas A&M–Corpus Christi ‍‍‍	11	–	13	–	0	.458	24	–	24	–	0	.500
Northwestern State ‍‍‍	10	–	14	–	0	.417	25	–	27	–	0	.481
Houston Christian ‍‍‍	9	–	15	–	0	.375	20	–	33	–	0	.377
Incarnate Word ‍‍‍	8	–	16	–	0	.333	16	–	30	–	1	.351
Texas A&M–Commerce* ‍‍‍	5	–	19	–	0	.208	9	–	39	–	0	.188
† – Conference champion ‡ – Tournament champion y – Invited to the NCAA tournament * Ineligible for the 2023 NCAA tournament due to transition from Division II; As of May 21, 2023; Rankings from NFCA/USA Today

The 2023 Texas A&M–Commerce Lions softball team represented Texas A&M University–Commerce during the 2023 NCAA Division I softball season as members of the Southland Conference. The Lions played their home games at John Cain Family Softball Complex and were led by first year head coach Brittany Miller.

This was the program's inaugural season in the Southland Conference. The 2023 Lions team compiled a 9-39 overall and 5-19 conference record. They failed to qualify for the conference tournament.

== Preseason ==
=== Southland Conference Coaches Poll ===
The Southland Conference Coaches Poll was released on January 26, 2023. Texas A&M–Commerce was picked to finish seventh in the Southland Conference with 47 votes.

Coaches poll
Predicted finish	Team	Votes (1st place)
1	McNeese State	128 (16)
2	Southeastern Louisiana	113 (2)
3	Northwestern State	91
4	Texas A&M–Corpus Christi	85
5	Houston Christian	58
6	Lamar	49
7	Texas A&M–Commerce	47
8	Incarnate Word	45
9	Nicholls	32

=== Preseason All-Southland team ===
No Texas A&M–Commerce players were named to conference preseason teams.

==== First Team ====
- Crislyne Moreno (MCNS, SO, 1st Base)
- Caleigh Cross (MCNS, SR, 2nd Base)
- Jil Poullard (MCNS, JR, 3rd Base)
- Maddie Watson (SELA, SO, Shortstop)
- Bailey Krolczyk (SELA, JR, Catcher)
- Kaylee Lopez (MCNS, SR, Utility)
- Audrey Greely (SELA, JR, Designated Player)
- Laney Roos (NSU, JR, Outfielder)
- Alayis Seneca (MCNS, SR, Outfielder)
- Cam Goodman (SELA, JR, Outfielder)
- Ashley Vallejo (MCNS, JR, Pitcher)
- Bronte Rhoden (NSU, SR, Pitcher)

==== Second Team ====
- Sydney Hoyt (TAMUCC, JR, 1st Base)
- Madison Rayner (SELA, SR, 2nd Base)
- Haylie Savage (HCU, SO, 3rd Base)
- Ryleigh Mata (UIW, SO, Shortstop)
- Tristin Court (NSU, JR, Catcher)
- Melise Gossen (NICH, SR, Utility)
- Chloe Gomez (MCNS, JR, Designated Player)
- Alexa Poche (NICH, JR, Outfielder)
- Makenzie Chaffin (NSU, JR, Outfielder)
- Bailie Ragsdale (NSU, SO, Outfielder)
- Lyndie Swanson (HCU, JR, Pitcher)
- Siarah Galvan (TAMUCC, SO, Pitcher)

== Roster ==
2023 Texas A&M–Commerce Lions softball team
Players
Coaches

#	Pos.	Name	Bats/throws	Height	Year	Home town
00	INF	Camile Nunez	R/R	5 ft 5 in (1.65 m)	Jr	Madera, California
1	OF	America Rubio	R/R	5 ft 8 in (1.73 m)	Jr	El Paso, Texas
2	P	Emma Olsen	R/R	5 ft 4 in (1.63 m)	Fr	Elk Grove, California
3	C	Elizabeth Guerro	R/R	5 ft 5 in (1.65 m)	So	San Antonio, Texas
6	INF	Emilia Miehe	R/R	5 ft 5 in (1.65 m)	Fr	Cameron Park, California
7	RHP	Anissa Arredondo	R/R	5 ft 4 in (1.63 m)	Jr	San Antonio, Texas
8	U	Diamond Sefe	R/R	5 ft 8 in (1.73 m)	Fr	Carson, California
10	INF	Jodi De Hart	R/R	5 ft 8 in (1.73 m)	Jr	Pittsburg, Texas
11	U	Kasey Kurykendall	R/R	5 ft 6 in (1.68 m)	Fr	Royse City, Texas
12	RHP	McKenna Meadors	R/R	5 ft 11 in (1.8 m)	So	Montgomery, Texas
13	U	KK Cosek	L/L	5 ft 9 in (1.75 m)	Fr	Helendale, California
16	INF	Tatum Wright	R/R	5 ft 6 in (1.68 m)	Fr	Frisco, Texas
17	OF	Ashlynn Griffith	L/R	5 ft 6 in (1.68 m)	So	Cedar Hill, Texas
20	RHP	Destiny Martinez	R/R	5 ft 5 in (1.65 m)	Fr	Denver, Colorado
21	U	Avery Zeigler	R/R	5 ft 5 in (1.65 m)	Sr	Sour Lake, Texas
22	C	Shelby Hodge	L/R	5 ft 5 in (1.65 m)	Fr	Katy, Texas
24	RHP	Madeline Janssen	R/R	5 ft 6 in (1.68 m)	Fr	Earlham, Iowa
29	U	Kaydee Bennett	L/R	5 ft 6 in (1.68 m)	Fr	Caddo Mills, Texas
44	RHP	Avanna Williams	R/R	5 ft 7 in (1.7 m)	Sr	Round Rock, Texas
85	RHP	Julia Sanchez	R/R	5 ft 8 in (1.73 m)	So	Houston, Texas

Head coach

Britanny Miller (University of Iowa)

Assistant coach(es)

Crystl Bustos (Palm Beach Community College)
Christine Core

Legend

- (C) Team captain
- (S) Suspended
- (I) Ineligible
- Injured
- Current redshirt

Roster
Last update: March 10, 2023

== Schedule and results ==
Legend
	Texas A&M–Commerce win
	Texas A&M–Commerce loss
	Postponement/Cancellation
**Bold**	Texas A&M–Commerce team member

2023 Texas A&M–Commerce Lions softball game log
Regular season (9–39)

February (2–14)
Date	Opponent	Rank	Site/stadium	Score	Win	Loss	Save	TV	Attendance	Overall record	SLC record
Aggie Classic
Feb. 10	vs. Michigan State		Davis Diamond • College Station, TX	0–11	Miller, Ashley (1-0)	**Meadors, McKenna (0-1)**				0–1	
Feb. 10	vs. Northern Kentucky		Davis Diamond • College Station, TX	4–10	Madisyn Eads (1-0)	**Arredondo, Anissa (0-1)**				0–2	
Feb. 11	at Texas A&M		Davis Diamond • College Station, TX	0–11	ACKERMAN (2-0)	**Arredondo, Anissa (0-2)**		SECN+	2,015	0–3	
Feb. 12	vs. Tarleton		Davis Diamond • College Station, TX	2–6	Ferguson, Kennedy (1-0)	**Arredondo, Anissa (0-1)**				0–4	
Feb. 12	at Texas A&M		Davis Diamond • College Station, TX	0–25	Kennedy, Emiley (1-0)	**Meadors, McKenna (0-2)**		SECN+	1,494	0–5	
Whataburger Invitational
Feb. 17	vs. Akron		Tarleton Softball Complex • Stephenville, TX	7–3	**Arredondo, Anissa (1-3)**	OTANI, Olivia (0-1)			185	1–5	
Feb. 17	vs. Northern Colorado		Tarleton Softball Complex • Stephenville, TX	0–4	Erin Caviness (2-1)	**Meadors, McKenna (0-3)**			181	1–6	
Feb. 18	vs. Northern Colorado		Tarleton Softball Complex • Stephenville, TX	6–7	Erin Caviness (3-1)	**Sanchez, Julia (0-1)**			121	1–7	
Feb. 18	at Tarleton		Tarleton Softball Complex • Stephenville, TX	0–8 (5 inn)	Bridges, Tristan (3-2)	**Sanchez, Julia (0-2)**			416	1–8	
Feb. 19	vs. Creighton		Tarleton Softball Complex • Stephenville, TX	5–4 (8 inn)	**Arredondo, Anissa (2-3)**	Natalia Puchino (1-2)			132	2–8	
Feb. 19	at Tarleton		Tarleton Softball Complex • Stephenville, TX	0–8 (6 inn)	Garcia, Grace (4-0)	**Olsen, Emma (0-1)**			414	2–9	
Baylor Tournament
Feb. 24	vs. Maryland	21	Getterman Stadium • Waco, TX	0–10 (5 inn)	Schlotterbeck, Trin (5-0)	**Janssen, Madeline (0-1)**				2–10	
Feb. 24	vs. Minnesota		Getterman Stadium • Waco, TX	0–17 (5 inn)	Jacie Hambrick (3-0)	**Arredondo, Anissa (2-4)**				2–11	
Feb. 25	at Baylor	23	Getterman Stadium • Waco, TX	3–7	RyLee Crandall (4-0)	**Arredondo, Anissa (2-5)**	Kaci West (1)			2–12	
Feb. 25	at Baylor	23	Getterman Stadium • Waco, TX	2–9	Kaci West (3-0)	**Sanchez, Julia (0-3)**	Dariana Orme (1)			2–13	
Feb. 26	vs. Maryland	21	Getterman Stadium • Waco, TX	1–3	Wyche, Courtney (5-3)	**Arredondo, Anissa (2-6)**				2–14	

March (3–12)
Date	Opponent	Rank	Site/stadium	Score	Win	Loss	Save	TV	Attendance	Overall record	SLC record
Hillenbrand Classic
Mar. 3	vs. Nebraska		Mike Candrea Field at Rita Hillenbrand Memorial Stadium • Tucson, AZ	0–3	Harness, Sarah(4-2)	**Sanchez, Julia(0-4)**	Wallace, Courtney (1)	FloSoftball		2–15	
Mar. 3	at Arizona	18	Mike Candrea Field at Rita Hillenbrand Memorial Stadium • Tucson, AZ	0–14 (5 inn)	Silva, Aissa (1-0)	**Arredondo, Anissa (2-7)**			2,473	2–16	
Mar. 4	at Arizona	18	Mike Candrea Field at Rita Hillenbrand Memorial Stadium • Tucson, AZ	8–17 (5 inn)	Blanchard, Ali (4-0)	**Olsen, Emma (0-2)**			2,889	2–17	
Mar. 4	vs. Cal State Northridge		Mike Candrea Field at Rita Hillenbrand Memorial Stadium • Tucson, AZ	17–12	**Sanchez, Julia (1-4)**	Carranco, Lauryn (0-4)		FloSoftball		3–17	
Mar. 5	vs. Weber State		Mike Candrea Field at Rita Hillenbrand Memorial Stadium • Tucson, AZ	8–7	**Sanchez, Julia (2-4)**	JOHNSON, Mandy (5-7)		FloSoftball		4–17	
Nevada Tournament
Mar. 10	vs. Southern Utah		Christina M. Hixson Softball Park • Reno, NV	Cancelled							
Mar. 10	at Nevada		Christina M. Hixson Softball Park • Reno, NV	Cancelled							
Mar. 11	vs. Southern Utah		Christina M. Hixson Softball Park • Reno, NV	Cancelled							
Mar. 11	at Nevada		Christina M. Hixson Softball Park • Reno, NV	Cancelled							
Mar. 14	at North Texas		Lovelace Stadium • Denton, TX	3–4	Ashley Peters (5-4)	**Sanchez, Julia (2-5)**		ESPN+		4–18	
Mar. 14	at North Texas		Lovelace Stadium • Denton, TX	0–8 (5 inn)	Skylar Savage (4-2)	**Meadors, McKenna (0-4)**		ESPN+	277	4–19	
Mar. 17	Nicholls		John Cain Family Softball Complex • Commerce, TX	5–4 (8 inn)	**Sanchez, Julia (3-5)**	Turner, Brittney (2-1)		ESPN+	326	5–19	1–0
Mar. 17	Nicholls		John Cain Family Softball Complex • Commerce, TX	6–15 (6 inn)	Yoo, Molly (7-3)	**Arredondo, Anissa (2-8)**		ESPN+		5–10	1–1
Mar. 18	Nicholls		John Cain Family Softball Complex • Commerce, TX	2–6	McNeill, Audrey (7-3)	**Sanchez, Julia (3-6)**		ESPN+	203	5–21	1–2
Mar. 24	at McNeese		Joe Miller Field at Cowgirl Diamond • Lake Charles, LA	0–9 (5 inn)	Tate, Whitney (10-2)	**Sanchez, Julia (3-7)**		ESPN+	708	5–22	1–3
Mar. 25	at McNeese		Joe Miller Field at Cowgirl Diamond • Lake Charles, LA	0–8 (5 inn)	Vallejo, Ashley (6-7)	**Meadors, McKenna (0-5)**		ESPN+		5–23	1–4
Mar. 25	at McNeese		Joe Miller Field at Cowgirl Diamond • Lake Charles, LA	0–1	Sanders, Shaelyn (3-0)	**Arredondo, Anissa (2-9)**		ESPN+	787	5–24	1–5
Mar. 31	at Southeastern		North Oak Park • Hammond, LA	0–3	Blanchard, Cera (11-4)	**Sanchez, Julia (3-8)**	DuBois, Ellie (2)	ESPN+	146	5–25	1–6
Mar. 31	at Southeastern		North Oak Park • Hammond, LA	0–8 (6 inn)	Comeaux, MC (6-2)	Meadors, McKenna (0-6)		ESPN+	146	5–26	1–7

April (4–10)
Date	Opponent	Rank	Site/stadium	Score	Win	Loss	Save	TV	Attendance	Overall record	SLC record
Apr. 1	at Southeastern		North Oak Park • Hammond, LA	2–10 (6 inn)	Ladner, KK (9-1)	**Arredondo, Anissa (2-10)**		ESPN+	146	5–27	1–8
Apr. 7	Texas A&M–Corpus Christi		John Cain Family Softball Complex • Commerce, TX	0–9 (5 inn)	Aholelei, Primrose (12-9)	**Sanchez, Julia (3-9)**		ESPN+	237	5–28	1–9
Apr. 7	Texas A&M–Corpus Christi		John Cain Family Softball Complex • Commerce, TX	1–4	Galvan, Siarah (3-2)	**Arredondo, Anissa (2-11)**		ESPN+		5–29	1–10
Apr. 8	Texas A&M–Corpus Christi		John Cain Family Softball Complex • Commerce, TX	2–0	Aholelei, Primrose (13-9)	**Sanchez, Julia (3-10)**		ESPN+	263	5–30	1–11
Apr. 11	at Houston Christian		Husky Field • Houston, TX	3–17 (5 inn)	Janes, Katy (6-8)	**Arredondo, Anissa (2-12)**		ESPN+	125	5–31	1–12
Apr. 11	at Houston Christian		Husky Field • Houston, TX	1–2	Swanson, Lyndie (8-5)	**Sanchez, Julia (3-11)**		ESPN+	125	5–32	1–13
Apr. 12	at Houston Christian		Husky Field • Houston, TX	6–8	Grofman, Ronni (4-2)	**Olsen, Emma (0-3)**		ESPN+	100	5–33	1–14
Apr. 18	at Arkansas	12	Bogle Park • Fayetteville, AR	1–8	Robyn Herron (7-4)	**Sanchez, Julia (3-12)**	Chenise Delce (1)	SECN+	2,341	5–34	
Apr. 21	Incarnate Word		John Cain Family Softball Complex • Commerce, TX	1–0	**Sanchez, Julia (4-12)**	Annie Gunther (6-7)		ESPN+	205	6–34	2–14
Apr. 21	Incarnate Word		John Cain Family Softball Complex • Commerce, TX	0–5	Madison Floyd (2-6)	**Arredondo, Anissa (2-13)**		ESPN+		6–35	2–15
Apr. 22	Incarnate Word		John Cain Family Softball Complex • Commerce, TX	1–0	**Sanchez, Julia (5-12)**	Annie Gunther (6-8)		ESPN+	184	7–35	3–15
Apr. 28	Northwestern State		John Cain Family Softball Complex • Commerce, TX	2–0	**Sanchez, Julia (6-12)**	Darr, Maggie (12-9)		ESPN+	173	8–35	4–15
Apr. 28	Northwestern State		John Cain Family Softball Complex • Commerce, TX	Suspended after 3 innings with Lions ahead 3–1							
Apr. 29	Northwestern State		John Cain Family Softball Complex • Commerce, TX	4–5	Seely, Kenzie (6-6)	**Sanchez, Julia (6-13)**	Denton, Ryleigh (2)	ESPN+		8–36	4–16
Apr. 29	Northwestern State		John Cain Family Softball Complex • Commerce, TX	4–3	**Sanchez, Julia (7-13)**	Rhoden, Bronte (2-3)	**Arredondo, Anissa (1)**	ESPN+	236	9–36	5–16

May (0–3)
Date	Opponent	Rank	Site/stadium	Score	Win	Loss	Save	TV	Attendance	Overall record	SLC record
May. 5	at Lamar		Lamar Softball Complex • Beaumont, TX	0–7	Ruiz, Aaliyah (11-11)	**Sanchez, Julia (7-14)**		ESPN+	300	9–37	5–17
May. 5	at Lamar		Lamar Softball Complex • Beaumont, TX	4–6	Ruiz, Aaliyah (12-11)	**Sanchez, Julia (7-15)**		ESPN+	397	9–38	5–18
May. 6	at Lamar		Lamar Softball Complex • Beaumont, TX	1–2	Ruiz, Aaliyah (13-11)	**Sanchez, Julia (7-16)**		ESPN+	371	9–39	5–19

Schedule source:*Rankings are based on the team's current ranking in the NFCA/USA Softball poll.
