= 2023 Northwestern State Lady Demons softball team =

American college softball season

2023 Northwestern State Lady Demons softball
- Conference: Southland Conference
- Record: 25–27 (10–14 Southland)
- Head coach: Donald Pickett (15th season)
- Assistant coach: Lexi Smith
- Home stadium: Lady Demon Diamond

2023 Southland Conference softball standings
	Conf.						Overall
Team	W		L		T	PCT	W		L		T	PCT
McNeese ‍†‍‡‍^{y}	21	–	3	–	0	.875	47	–	16	–	0	.746
Southeastern Louisiana ‍‍‍	19	–	5	–	0	.792	47	–	14	–	0	.770
Nicholls ‍‍‍	13	–	11	–	0	.542	29	–	24	–	0	.547
Lamar ‍‍‍	12	–	12	–	0	.500	22	–	34	–	0	.393
Texas A&M–Corpus Christi ‍‍‍	11	–	13	–	0	.458	24	–	24	–	0	.500
Northwestern State ‍‍‍	10	–	14	–	0	.417	25	–	27	–	0	.481
Houston Christian ‍‍‍	9	–	15	–	0	.375	20	–	33	–	0	.377
Incarnate Word ‍‍‍	8	–	16	–	0	.333	16	–	30	–	1	.351
Texas A&M–Commerce* ‍‍‍	5	–	19	–	0	.208	9	–	39	–	0	.188
† – Conference champion ‡ – Tournament champion y – Invited to the NCAA tournament * Ineligible for the 2023 NCAA tournament due to transition from Division II; As of May 21, 2023; Rankings from NFCA/USA Today

The 2023 Northwestern State Lady Demons softball team represented Northwestern State University during the 2023 NCAA Division I softball season. The Lady Demons played their home games at Lady Demon Diamond and were led by fifteenth year head coach Donald Pickett. They are members of the Southland Conference.

== Preseason ==
=== Southland Conference Coaches Poll ===
The Southland Conference Coaches Poll was released on January 26, 2023. Northwestern State was picked to finish third in the Southland Conference with 91 votes.

Coaches poll
Predicted finish	Team	Votes (1st place)
1	McNeese State	128 (16)
2	Southeastern Louisiana	113 (2)
3	Northwestern State	91
4	Texas A&M–Corpus Christi	85
5	Houston Christian	58
6	Lamar	49
7	Texas A&M–Commerce	47
8	Incarnate Word	45
9	Nicholls	32

=== Preseason All-Southland team ===
Two Lady Demons were named to the conference preseason first team, and three Lady Demons were named as second team members.

==== First Team ====
- Crislyne Moreno (MCNS, SO, 1st Base)
- Caleigh Cross (MCNS, SR, 2nd Base)
- Jil Poullard (MCNS, JR, 3rd Base)
- Maddie Watson (SELA, SO, Shortstop)
- Bailey Krolczyk (SELA, JR, Catcher)
- Kaylee Lopez (MCNS, SR, Utility)
- Audrey Greely (SELA, JR, Designated Player)
- Laney Roos (NSU, JR, Outfielder)
- Alayis Seneca (MCNS, SR, Outfielder)
- Cam Goodman (SELA, JR, Outfielder)
- Ashley Vallejo (MCNS, JR, Pitcher)
- Bronte Rhoden (NSU, SR, Pitcher)

==== Second Team ====
- Sydney Hoyt (TAMUCC, JR, 1st Base)
- Madison Rayner (SELA, SR, 2nd Base)
- Haylie Savage (HCU, SO, 3rd Base)
- Ryleigh Mata (UIW, SO, Shortstop)
- Tristin Court (NSU, JR, Catcher)
- Melise Gossen (NICH, SR, Utility)
- Chloe Gomez (MCNS, JR, Designated Player)
- Alexa Poche (NICH, JR, Outfielder)
- Makenzie Chaffin (NSU, JR, Outfielder)
- Bailie Ragsdale (NSU, SO, Outfielder)
- Lyndie Swanson (HCU, JR, Pitcher)
- Siarah Galvan (TAMUCC, SO, Pitcher)

== Roster ==
2023 Northwestern State Lady Demons softball team
Players
Coaches

#	Pos.	Name	Bats/throws	Height	Year	Home town
0	OF	Vivica Hernandez	L/L	5 ft 5 in (1.65 m)	So	Fort Worth, Texas
2	OF	Camryn Ford	L/L	5 ft 4 in (1.63 m)	Fr	Marthaville, Louisiana
4	C	Ashlyn Walker	R/R	5 ft 10 in (1.78 m)	Jr	Saginaw, Texas
6	OF	Makenzie Chaffin	L/R	5 ft 8 in (1.73 m)	Jr	Bossier City, Louisiana
7	RHP	Bronte Rhoden	R/R	5 ft 7 in (1.7 m)	Sr	Plano, Texas
9	OF	Laney Roos	L/L	5 ft 7 in (1.7 m)	Jr	Aubrey, Texas
10	INF	Megan Risher	L/L	5 ft 5 in (1.65 m)	Fr	Benton, Louisiana
11	RHP	Kenzie Seely	R/R	5 ft 5 in (1.65 m)	Jr	Whitney, Texas
12	INF	Taylor Williams	L/R	5 ft 3 in (1.6 m)	Jr	Tom Bean, Texas
13	C	Tristin Court	R/R	6 ft 0 in (1.83 m)	Jr	Rockwall, Texas
14	INF	Keely DuBois	R/R	5 ft 9 in (1.75 m)	Jr	Robeline, Louisiana
15	RHP	Nana Vences (redshirt)	R/R	5 ft 10 in (1.78 m)	RS Fr	Marshall, Texas
17	INF	Kat Marshall	R/R	5 ft 9 in (1.75 m)	Jr	Brenham, Texas
18	RHP	Rylie Denton	L/R	5 ft 7 in (1.7 m)	Jr	Rotan, Texas
22	OF	Bailie Ragsdale	L/R	5 ft 5 in (1.65 m)	So	Lone Oak, Texas
23	OF	Nani Winger (redshirt)	R/R	5 ft 8 in (1.73 m)	RS So	Friendswood, Texas
24	RHP	Haley Parker (redshirt)	R/R	5 ft 11 in (1.8 m)	RS Fr	Fort Worth, Texas
27	C	Derika Castillo	R/R	5 ft 5 in (1.65 m)	So	Houston, Texas
28	RHP	Maggie Darr (redshirt)	R/R	6 ft 3 in (1.91 m)	RS So	Missouri City, Texas
33	C	Lexie Roos	R/R	5 ft 8 in (1.73 m)	Jr	Aubrey, Texas

Head coach

Donald Pickett (UT Chattanooga)

Assistant coach(es)

Lexi Smith (Texas A&M)

Legend

- (C) Team captain
- (S) Suspended
- (I) Ineligible
- Injured
- Current redshirt

Roster
Last update: January 5, 2023

== Schedule and results ==
Legend
	Northwestern State win
	Northwestern State loss
	Postponement/Cancellation
**Bold**	Northwestern State team member
*	Non-Conference game
†	Make-Up Game

2023 Northwestern State Lady Demons softball game log
Regular season (25–27)

February (7–7)
Date	Opponent	Rank	Site/stadium	Score	Win	Loss	Save	TV	Attendance	Overall record	SLC record
Bearkat Classic
Feb. 10	vs. UTSA*		Bearkat Softball Complex • Huntsville, TX	3–1	**Darr, Maggie (1-0)**	GILBERT (0-1)	**Rhoden, Bronte (1)**		105	1–0	
Feb. 11	vs. Delaware*		Bearkat Softball Complex • Huntsville, TX	4–7	Shank (1-0)	**Darr, Maggie (0-1)**	Winburn (1)		155	1–1	
Feb. 12	vs. South Dakota State*		Bearkat Softball Complex • Huntsville, TX	0–2	Lasey (2-0)	**Denton, Ryleigh (0-1)**			150	1–2	
Feb. 12	at Sam Houston State*		Bearkat Softball Complex • Huntsville, TX	1–2	GUIDON, EMMA (2-0)	**Darr, Maggie (1-2)**			305	1–3	
2023 Mardi Gras Mambo
Feb. 17	vs. St. Thomas*		Youngsville Sports Complex • Youngsville, LA	5–3	**Seely, Kenzie (1-0)**	Keira Murphy (0-2)			102	2–3	
Feb. 17	vs. Florida A&M*		Youngsville Sports Complex • Youngsville, LA	9–0 (5 inn)	**Darr, Maggie (2-2)**	Lauryn Peppers (0-2)			96	3–3	
Feb. 18	vs. Manhattan*		Youngsville Sports Complex • Youngsville, LA	5–0	**Denton, Ryleigh (1-1)**	VENEZIALE, Makayla (0-1)			68	4–3	
Feb. 18	vs. Gardner–Webb*		Youngsville Sports Complex • Youngsville, LA	8–2	**Rhoden, Bronte (1-0)**	KYLE, KALYN (1-1)			75	5–3	
Feb. 19	vs. Toledo*		Youngsville Sports Complex • Youngsville, LA	6–0	**Darr, Maggie (3-2)**	HUNT, Erin (1-4)			89	6–3	
Feb. 22	Grambling*		Lady Demon Diamond • Natchitoches, LA	2–1	**Darr, Maggie (3-2)**	Hodge, Jordan (0-1)	**Rhoden, Bronte (2)**		437	7–3	
North Texas Invitational
Feb. 25	vs. Wichita State*		Lovelace Stadium • Denton, TX	1–7	HOWELL, L. (4-1)	**Denton, Ryleigh (1-2)**			128	7–4	
Feb. 25	at North Texas*		Lovelace Stadium • Denton, TX	3–5	Savage, S. (3-0)	**Darr, Maggie (4-3)**	Peters, A. (1)		354	7–5	
Feb. 26	vs. Wichita State*		Lovelace Stadium • Denton, TX	2–5	AGUILAR, A. (3-1)	**Seely, Kenzie (1-1)**			108	7–6	
Feb. 26	at North Texas*		Lovelace Stadium • Denton, TX	1–10 (6 inn)	Peters, A. (4-3)	**Rhoden, Bronte (1-1)**			400	7–7	

March (10–8)
Date	Opponent	Rank	Site/stadium	Score	Win	Loss	Save	TV	Attendance	Overall record	SLC record
Natchitoches Historic District Development Commission Lady Demon Classic
Mar. 3	Arkansas–Pine Bluff*		Lady Demon Diamond • Natchitoches, LA	9–1 (5 inn)	**Seely, Kenzie (2-1)**	LeeAnn Raney (0-3)		ESPN+	689	8–7	
Mar. 4	Jackson State*		Lady Demon Diamond • Natchitoches, LA	8–0 (5 inn)	**Darr, Maggie (5-3)**	Victoria Salazar (2-3)		ESPN+	368	9–7	
Mar. 5	Arkansas–Pine Bluff*		Lady Demon Diamond • Natchitoches, LA	1–0	**Darr, Maggie (5-3)**	Sydney Green (2-4)		ESPN+	169	10–7	
Mar. 5	Jackson State*		Lady Demon Diamond • Natchitoches, LA	6–1	**Denton, Ryleigh (2-2)**	Marissa Medina (2-1)	**Seely, Kenzie (1)**	ESPN+	148	11–7	
Mar. 11	Lamar		Lady Demon Diamond • Natchitoches, LA	2–8	Mitchell, Karyana (4-9)	**Darr, Maggie (6-4)**		ESPN+	248	11–8	0–1
Mar. 11	Lamar		Lady Demon Diamond • Natchitoches, LA	5–4	**Seely, Kenzie (3-1)**	Niedenthal, Cameron (2-2)		ESPN+	246	12–8	1–1
Mar. 12	Lamar		Lady Demon Diamond • Natchitoches, LA	1–6	Ruiz, Aaliyah (3-6)	**Denton, Ryleigh (2-3)**		ESPN+	187	12–9	1–2
Mar. 14	at Louisiana Tech*		Lady Techster Softball Complex • Ruston, LA	0–5	MELNYCHUK, B (4-2)	**Darr, Maggie (6-5)**		CUSAtv	677	12–10	
Memphis Tiger Classic
Mar. 17	vs. Indiana*		Tiger Softball Complex • Memphis, TN	2–4	Copeland (8-0)	**Denton, Ryleigh (2-4)**			155	12–11	
Mar. 17	at Memphis*		Tiger Softball Complex • Memphis, TN	6–3	**Rhoden, Bronte (2-1)**	Siems, Halli (3-11)	**Darr, Maggie (1)**		207	13–11	
Mar. 18	vs. Indiana*		Tiger Softball Complex • Memphis, TN	6–11	Copeland (9-0)	**Seely, Kenzie (3-2)**			150	13–12	
Mar. 19	vs. Memphis*		Tiger Softball Complex • Memphis, TN	15–5 (5 inn)	**Denton, Ryleigh (3-4)**	Hoschak, Mik (0-5)			250	14–12	
Mar. 24	at Nicholls		Swanner Field at Geo Surfaces Park • Thibodaux, LA	6–5	**Darr, Maggie (7-5)**	McNeill, Audrey (7-5)		ESPN+	131	15–12	2–2
Mar. 24	at Nicholls		Swanner Field at Geo Sources Park • Thibodaux, LA	3–1	**Seely, Kenzie (4-2)**	Yoo, Molly (7-4)		ESPN+	102	16–12	3–2
Mar. 25	at Nicholls		Swanner Field at Geo Sources Park • Thibodaux, LA	3–4 (8 inn)	Yoo, Molly (8-4)	**Rhoden, Bronte (2-2)**		ESPN+	127	16–13	3–3
Mar. 28	Louisiana Tech*		Lady Demon Diamond • Natchitoches, LA	1–5	FLOYD, Allie (3-4)	**Seely, Kenzie (4-3)**		ESPN+	248	16–14	
Mar. 31	Houston Christian		Lady Demon Diamond • Natchtoches, LA	8–0 (5 inn)	**Darr, Maggie (8-5)**	Janes, Katy (5-7)		ESPN+	178	17–14	4–3
Mar. 31	Houston Christian		Lady Demon Diamond • Natchtoches, LA	1–2	Swanson, Lyndie (7-5)	**Seely, Kenzie (4-4)**		ESPN+	163	17–15	4–4

April (7–7)
Date	Opponent	Rank	Site/stadium	Score	Win	Loss	Save	TV	Attendance	Overall record	SLC record
Apr. 1	Houston Christian		Lady Demon Diamond • Natchtoches, LA	6–1	**Darr, Maggie (9-5)**	Janes, Katy (5-8)		ESPN+	205	19–15	5–4
Apr. 7	at McNeese		Joe Miller Field at Cowgirl Diamond • Lake Charles, LA	7–6	**Darr, Maggie (10-5)**	Davis, Lindsay (3-2)		ESPN+		20–15	6–4
Apr. 7	at McNeese		Joe Miller Field at Cowgirl Diamond • Lake Charles, LA	0–4	Vallejo, Ashley (8-7)	**Seely, Kenzie (4-5)**		ESPN+	687	20–16	6–5
Apr. 8	at McNeese		Joe Miller Field at Cowgirl Diamond • Lake Charles, LA	0–2	Vallejo, Ashley (9-7)	**Darr, Maggie (10-6)**	Davis, Lindsay (4)	ESPN+	707	20–17	6–6
Apr. 11	at Grambling*		GSU Softball Complex • Grambling, LA	9–1	**Darr, Maggie (11-6)**	Lauren Ervin (1-1)			89	21–17	
Apr. 14	at Incarnate Word		H-E-B Field • San Antonio, TX	2–3 (10 inn)	Portillo, S (0-0)	**Darr, Maggie (0-0)**		ESPN+	67	21–18	7–8
Apr. 14	at Incarnate Word		H-E-B Field • San Antonio, TX	9–5	**Denton, Ryleigh (4-4)**	MYERS, N (0-0)	**Rhoden, Bronte (3)**	ESPN+	120	21–19	8–8
Apr. 15	at Incarnate Word		H-E-B Field • San Antonio, TX	3–11 (5 inn)	GUNTHER, A (0-0)	**Seely, Kenzie (0-0)**		ESPN+	83	21–19	8–9
Apr. 21	Texas A&M–Corpus Christi		Lady Demon Diamond • Natchitoches, LA	2–1	**Darr, Maggie (12-7)**	Aholelei, Primrose (15-10)		ESPN+	189	21–19	8–9
Apr. 21	Texas A&M–Corpus Christi		Lady Demon Diamond • Natchitoches, LA	6–3	**Seely, Kenzie (5-6)**	Galvan, Siarah (3-3)	**Denton, Ryleigh (1)**	ESPN+	138	22–19	9–9
Apr. 22	Texas A&M–Corpus Christi		Lady Demon Diamond • Natchitoches, LA	1–5	Aholelei, Primrose (16-10)	**Darr, Maggie (12-8)**		ESPN+	208	23–20	9–9
Apr. 28	at Texas A&M–Commerce		John Cain Family Softball Complex • Commerce, TX	0–2	Sanchez, J. (6-12)	**Darr, Maggie (12-9)**		ESPN+	173	23–21	9–10
Apr. 28	at Texas A&M–Commerce		John Cain Family Softball Complex • Commerce, TX	5–4	**Seely, Kenzie (6-6)**	Sanchez, J. (6-13)	**Denton, Ryleigh (2)**	ESPN+		24–21	10–10
Apr. 29	at Texas A&M–Commerce		John Cain Family Softball Complex • Commerce, TX	3–4	Sanchez, J. (7-13)	**Rhoden, Bronte (2-3)**	Arredondo, A (1)	ESPN+	236	24–22	10–11

May (0–3)
Date	Opponent	Rank	Site/stadium	Score	Win	Loss	Save	TV	Attendance	Overall record	SLC record
May. 5	Southeastern Louisiana		Lady Demon Diamond • Natchitoches, LA	5–7	DuBois, Ellie (1-0)	Denton, Ryleigh (4-5)		ESPN+	206	24–23	10–12
May. 5	Southeastern Louisiana		Lady Demon Diamond • Natchitoches, LA	0–3	Blanchard, Cera (16-6)	**Seely, Kenzie (6-7)**		ESPN+	208	24–24	10–13
May. 6	Southeastern Louisiana		Lady Demon Diamond • Natchitoches, LA	1–7	DuBois, Ellie (2-0)	**Rhoden, Bronte (2-4)**	Comeaux, MC (4)	ESPN+	185	24–25	10–14

Post-Season (1–2)

Southland Tournament (1–2)
Date	Opponent	(Seed)/Rank	Site/stadium	Score	Win	Loss	Save	TV	Attendance	Overall record	Tournament record
May 9	vs. (3) Nicholls	(6)	Joe Miller Field at Cowgirl Diamond • Lake Charles, LA	8–2 (8 inn)	**Seely, Kenzie (7-7)**	Yoo, M. (12-11)		ESPN+	457	25–25	1–0
May 10	vs. (2) Southeastern Louisiana	(6)	Joe Miller Field at Cowgirl Diamond • Lake Charles, LA	1–13 (5 inn)	Ladner, KK (15-1)	**Seely, Kenzie (7-8)**		ESPN+	394	25–26	1–1
May 11	vs. (4) Lamar	(6)	Joe Miller Field at Cowgirl Diamond • Lake Charles, LA	4–5	Ruiz, Aaliyah (13-11)	**Darr, Maggie (12-10)**	Ben Karim, Fadwa (1)	ESPN+		25–27	1–2

Schedule source:*Rankings are based on the team's current ranking in the NFCA/USA Softball poll.
