= 2023 Nicholls Colonels softball team =

American college softball season

2023 Nicholls Colonels softball
- Conference: Southland Conference
- Record: 29–24 (13–11 Southland)
- Head coach: Justin Lewis (2nd season)
- Assistant coaches: Ron Frost; Kat Frakes
- Home stadium: Swanner Field at Geo Surfaces Park

2023 Southland Conference softball standings
	Conf.						Overall
Team	W		L		T	PCT	W		L		T	PCT
McNeese ‍†‍‡‍^{y}	21	–	3	–	0	.875	47	–	16	–	0	.746
Southeastern Louisiana ‍‍‍	19	–	5	–	0	.792	47	–	14	–	0	.770
Nicholls ‍‍‍	13	–	11	–	0	.542	29	–	24	–	0	.547
Lamar ‍‍‍	12	–	12	–	0	.500	22	–	34	–	0	.393
Texas A&M–Corpus Christi ‍‍‍	11	–	13	–	0	.458	24	–	24	–	0	.500
Northwestern State ‍‍‍	10	–	14	–	0	.417	25	–	27	–	0	.481
Houston Christian ‍‍‍	9	–	15	–	0	.375	20	–	33	–	0	.377
Incarnate Word ‍‍‍	8	–	16	–	0	.333	16	–	30	–	1	.351
Texas A&M–Commerce* ‍‍‍	5	–	19	–	0	.208	9	–	39	–	0	.188
† – Conference champion ‡ – Tournament champion y – Invited to the NCAA tournament * Ineligible for the 2023 NCAA tournament due to transition from Division II; As of May 21, 2023; Rankings from NFCA/USA Today

The 2023 Nicholls Colonels softball team represented Nicholls State University during the 2023 NCAA Division I softball season. The Colonels played their home games at Swanner Field at Geo Surfaces Park and were led by second-year head coach Justin Lewis. They are members of the Southland Conference.

== Preseason ==
=== Southland Conference Coaches Poll ===
The Southland Conference Coaches Poll was released on January 26, 2023. Nicholls was picked to finish ninth in the Southland Conference with 32 votes.

Coaches poll
Predicted finish	Team	Votes (1st place)
1	McNeese State	128 (16)
2	Southeastern Louisiana	113 (2)
3	Northwestern State	91
4	Texas A&M–Corpus Christi	85
5	Houston Christian	58
6	Lamar	49
7	Texas A&M–Commerce	47
8	Incarnate Word	45
9	Nicholls	32

=== Preseason All-Southland team ===
Two Nicholls players were named to the conference preseason second team.

==== First Team ====
- Crislyne Moreno (MCNS, SO, 1st Base)
- Caleigh Cross (MCNS, SR, 2nd Base)
- Jil Poullard (MCNS, JR, 3rd Base)
- Maddie Watson (SELA, SO, Shortstop)
- Bailey Krolczyk (SELA, JR, Catcher)
- Kaylee Lopez (MCNS, SR, Utility)
- Audrey Greely (SELA, JR, Designated Player)
- Laney Roos (NSU, JR, Outfielder)
- Alayis Seneca (MCNS, SR, Outfielder)
- Cam Goodman (SELA, JR, Outfielder)
- Ashley Vallejo (MCNS, JR, Pitcher)
- Bronte Rhoden (NSU, SR, Pitcher)

==== Second Team ====
- Sydney Hoyt (TAMUCC, JR, 1st Base)
- Madison Rayner (SELA, SR, 2nd Base)
- Haylie Savage (HCU, SO, 3rd Base)
- Ryleigh Mata (UIW, SO, Shortstop)
- Tristin Court (NSU, JR, Catcher)
- Melise Gossen (NICH, SR, Utility)
- Chloe Gomez (MCNS, JR, Designated Player)
- Alexa Poche (NICH, JR, Outfielder)
- Makenzie Chaffin (NSU, JR, Outfielder)
- Bailie Ragsdale (NSU, SO, Outfielder)
- Lyndie Swanson (HCU, JR, Pitcher)
- Siarah Galvan (TAMUCC, SO, Pitcher)

== Roster ==
2023 Nicholls Colonels softball team
Players
Coaches

#	Pos.	Name	Bats/throws	Height	Year	Home town
1	OF	Brianna McFaddin	L/R	5 ft 4 in (1.63 m)	Fr	Keller, Texas
2	OF	McKenzie Champagne	L/R	5 ft 4 in (1.63 m)	So	Lockport, Louisiana
3	U	Claire Cisco	L/R	5 ft 4 in (1.63 m)	Fr	College Station, Texas
4	INF	Makynli Miller	R/R	5 ft 6 in (1.68 m)	Fr	Many, Louisiana
5	INF	Erin Krause	L/R	5 ft 7 in (1.7 m)	Fr	Cypress, Texas
6	RHP	Paris Lehman	R/R	6 ft 0 in (1.83 m)	So	Tupelo, Mississippi
7	RHP	Molly VandenBout	R/R	5 ft 10 in (1.78 m)	So	Temple, Texas
9	INF	Alexa Poche'	L/L	5 ft 8 in (1.73 m)	Jr	New Orleans, Louisiana
10	RHP	Kalyn DeHart	R/R	5 ft 4 in (1.63 m)	Fr	Houma, Louisiana
13	LHP	Averi Padin	R/L	5 ft 5 in (1.65 m)	Fr	Summit, Mississippi
14	RHP	Audrey McNeil	R/R	5 ft 7 in (1.7 m)	Jr	Plano, Texas
15	INF	Lilianna Robledo	R/R	5 ft 5 in (1.65 m)	Fr	Converse, Texas
16	OF	Reagan Heflin	L/R	5 ft 8 in (1.73 m)	Fr	Richmond, Texas
17	C	Tal Evans	R/R	5 ft 6 in (1.68 m)	Fr	Victoria, Texas
18	INF	Sydni Stevens	R/R	5 ft 9 in (1.75 m)	Fr	Seguin, Texas
19	OF	Samantha Gwiazda	R/R	5 ft 9 in (1.75 m)	Jr	Frankfort, Illinois
20	U	Melise Gossen	R/R	5 ft 8 in (1.73 m)	Sr	Rayne, Louisiana
21	INF	Sydnee Shelton	R/R	5 ft 9 in (1.75 m)	Jr	Fort Worth, Texas
22	LHP	Molly Yoo	L/L	5 ft 8 in (1.73 m)	Fr	Cypress, Texas
23	RHP	Brittney Turner	R/R	5 ft 9 in (1.75 m)	Jr	Albany, Louisiana
24	RHP	Jensen Gremillion	R/R	5 ft 5 in (1.65 m)	Jr	Plaucheville, Louisiana
25	OF	Carmella Muccilli	R/R	5 ft 8 in (1.73 m)	Fr	Santa Cruz, California
26	C	Brynne Songy	R/R	5 ft 4 in (1.63 m)	Fr	Prairieville, Louisiana
28	C	Adie Brake (redshirt)	R/R	5 ft 11 in (1.8 m)	So	Denver, Colorado
42	P	Abigail Anderson	R/R	5 ft 10 in (1.78 m)	Jr	Mesa, Arizona

Head coach

Justin Lewis (Louisiana–Monroe)

Assistant coach(es)

Ron Frost (Alabama State)
Kat Frakes (UIS)

Legend

- (C) Team captain
- (S) Suspended
- (I) Ineligible
- Injured
- Current redshirt

Roster
Last update: March 10, 2023

== Schedule and results ==
Legend
	Nicholls win
	Nicholls loss
	Postponement/Cancellation
**Bold**	Nicholls team member

2023 Nicholls State Colonels softball game log
Regular season (29–24)

February (10–6)
Date	Opponent	Rank	Site/stadium	Score	Win	Loss	Save	TV	Attendance	Overall record	SLC record
Feb. 9	New Mexico		Swanner Field at Geo Surfaces Park • Thibodaux, LA	3–12 (5 inn)	LINTON, Amber (1-0)	**Yoo, Molly (0-1)**		ESPN+		0–1	
Lion Classic
Feb. 10	vs. Missouri State		North Oak Park • Hammond, LA	8–3	**McNeill, Audrey (1-0)**	Gracie Johnston (0-1)			100	1–1	
Feb. 11	vs. Missouri State		Game cancelled due to weather								
LSU Invitational
Feb. 12	vs. Oregon State	19	Tiger Park • Baton Rouge, LA	3–6	Ellie Garcia (1-1)	**Yoo, Molly (0-2)**	Tarni Stepto (1)		247	1–2	
Feb. 12	at LSU	20	Tiger Park • Baton Rouge, LA	3–4	Alea Johnson (1-0)	**VandenBout, Molly (0-1)**	Sydney Berzon (2)	SECN+	1,959	1–3	
Mardi Gras Mambo
Feb. 17	vs. Gardner–Web		Youngsville Sports Complex • Youngsville, LA	11–4	**Yoo, Molly (1-2)**	LYON ANDREA (1-1)			200	2–3	
Feb. 17	vs. St. Thomas		Youngsville Sports Complex • Youngsville, LA	3–4 (8 inn)	Isabelle True (0-0)	**Paden, Averi (0-0)**			29	2–4	
Feb. 18	vs. Florida A&M		Youngsville Sports Complex • Youngsville, LA	12–2 (5 inn)	**Turner, Brittney (1-0)**	Cris'Deona Beasley (1-2)			88	3–4	
Feb. 18	vs. Toledo		Youngsville Sports Complex • Youngsville, LA	5–2	**McNeill, Audrey (2-0)**	KNIGHT, Sophia (1-3)			75	4–4	
Feb. 19	vs. Manhattan		Youngsville Sports Complex • Youngsville, LA	4–1	**Yoo, Molly (1-2)**	CHAREST, Mollie (0-1)				5–4	
Feb. 22	Alcorn State		Swanner Field at Geo Sources Park • Thibodaux, LA	9–0 (5 inn)	**McNeill, Audrey (3-0)**	Parker, Kiri (0-1)		ESPN+	203	6–4	
Feb. 22	Alcorn State		Swanner Field at Geo Sources Park • Thibodaux, LA	12–1 (5 inn)	**Yoo, Molly (3-2)**	Fletcher, Ta'Niyah (0-1)		ESPN+	203	7–4	
Black and Gold Invitational
Feb. 24	vs. Yale		Southern Miss Softball Complex • Hattiesburg, MS	4–1	**McNeill, Audrey (4-0)**	Emma Taylor (0-1)	**Turner, Brittney (1)**			8–4	
Feb. 24	vs. Arkansas–Pine Bluff		Southern Miss Softball Complex • Hattiesburg, MS	11–0 (5 inn)	**Yoo, Molly (4-2)**	Danika Bryant (0-4)			743	9–4	
Feb. 25	vs. Yale		Southern Miss Softball Complex • Hattiesburg, MS	3–5	Maddie Latta (1-1)	**Paden, Averi (0-2)**	Nicole Conway (1)			9–5	
Feb. 25	vs. Arkansas–Pine Bluff		Southern Miss Softball Complex • Hattiesburg, MS	13–2 (5 inn)	**Turner, Brittney (2-0)**	Traelen Humphrey (0-2)				10–5	
Feb. 26	at Southern Miss		Southern Miss Softball Complex • Hattiesburg, MS	1–3	Morgan Leinstock (5-1)	**McNeill, Audrey (4-1)**			744	10–6	

March (10–7)
Date	Opponent	Rank	Site/stadium	Score	Win	Loss	Save	TV	Attendance	Overall record	SLC record
Mar. 1	at Jackson State		Jackson State University Softball Stadium • Jackson, MS	13–0 (5 inn)	**Yoo, Molly (5-2)**	Macie Kuppenbender (1-2)				11–6	
Mar. 1	at Jackson State		Jackson State University Softball Stadium • Jackson, MS	8–0	**Gremillion, Jensen (1-0)**	Takiya Hill (1-4)				12–6	
Mar. 3	Louisiana–Monroe		Swanner Field at Geo Sources Park • Thibodaux, LA	3–4	Hulett, Gianni (5-1)	**McNeill, Audrey (4-2)**		ESPN+	201	12–7	
Mar. 4	Louisiana–Monroe		Swanner Field at Geo Sources Park • Thibodaux, LA	1–0	**Yoo, Molly (6-2)**	Giddens, Kassidy (1-3)		ESPN+	132	13–7	
Mar. 4	Louisiana–Monroe		Swanner Field at Geo Sources Park • Thibodaux, LA	2–3	Chavarria, Adrianna (4-1)	**McNeill, Audrey (4-3)**	Hulett, Gianni (4)	ESPN+	201	13–8	
Mar. 7	Mississippi Valley State		Game cancelled								
Mar. 7	Mississippi Valley State		Game cancelled								
Mar. 10	Incarnate Word		Swanner Field at Geo Sources Park • Thibodaux, LA	2–4 (8 inn)	Aaliyah Garcia (3-2)	**Yoo, Molly (6-3)**		ESPN+	102	13–9	0–1
Mar. 10	Incarnate Word		Swanner Field at Geo Sources Park • Thibodaux, LA	10–2 (5 inn)	**McNeill, Audrey (5-3)**	Madison Floyd (1-4)		ESPN+	112	14–9	1–1
Mar. 11	Incarnate Word		Swanner Field at Geo Sources Park • Thibodaux, LA	3–0	**McNeill, Audrey (6-3)**	Aaliyah Garcia (3-3)		ESPN+	151	15–9	2–1
Mar. 15	at Southern		Lady Jaguar Field • Baton Rouge, LA	Cancelled							
Mar. 17	at Texas A&M–Commerce		John Cain Family Softball Complex • Commerce, TX	4–5 (8 inn)	Sanchez, Julia (3-5)	**Turner, Brittney (2-1)**		ESPN+	326	15–10	2–2
Mar. 17	at Texas A&M–Commerce		John Cain Family Softball Complex • Commerce, TX	15–6 (6 inn)	**Yoo, Molly (7-3)**	Arredondo, Anissa (2-8)		ESPN+		16–10	3–2
Mar. 18	at Texas A&M–Commerce		John Cain Family Softball Complex • Commerce, TX	6–2	**McNeill, Audrey (7-3)**	Sanchez, Julia (3-6)		ESPN+	203	17–10	4–2
Mar. 21	South Alabama		Swanner Field at Geo Sources Park • Thibodaux, LA	2–5	Lagle, Madison (1-0)	**McNeill, Audrey (7-4)**	Hardy, Jenna (2)	ESPN+	102	17–11	
Mar. 24	Northwestern State		Swanner Field at Geo Sources Park • Thibodaux, LA	5–6	Darr, Maggie (7-5)	**McNeill, Audrey (7-5)**		ESPN+	131	17–12	4–3
Mar. 24	Northwestern State		Swanner Field at Geo Sources Park • Thibodaux, LA	1–3	Seely, Kenzie (4-2)	**Yoo, Molly (7-4)**		ESPN+	102	17–13	4–4
Mar. 25	Northwestern State		Swanner Field at Geo Sources Park • Thibodaux, LA	4–3 (8 inn)	**Yoo, Molly (7-4)**	Rhoden, Bronte (2-2)			127	18–13	5–4
Mar. 31	at Texas A&M-Corpus Christi		Chapman Field • Corpus Christi, TX	3–2 (8 inn)	**Yoo, Molly (9-4)**	Aholelei, Primrose (10-9)		ESPN+		19–13	6–4
Mar. 31	at Texas A&M-Corpus Christi		Chapman Field • Corpus Christi, TX	6–1	**Yoo, Molly (10-4)**	Hoyt, Sydney (2-3)		ESPN+	237	20–13	7–4

April (7–9)
Date	Opponent	Rank	Site/stadium	Score	Win	Loss	Save	TV	Attendance	Overall record	SLC record
Apr. 1	at Texas A&M-Corpus Christi		Chapman Field • Corpus Christi, TX	4–9	Aholelei, Primrose (11-9)	McNeill, Audrey (7-6)		ESPN+	249	20–14	7–5
Apr. 4	at Southern Miss		Southern Miss Softball Complex • Hattiesburg, MS	1–8	Morgan Leinstock (9-10)	**Yoo, Molly (10-5)**			590	20–15	
Apr. 6	Lamar		Swanner Field at Geo Sources Park • Thibodaux, LA	5–4 (8 inn)	**McNeill, Audrey (8-6)**	Niedenthal, C (2-6)		ESPN+	87	21–15	8–5
Apr. 6	Lamar		Swanner Field at Geo Sources Park • Thibodaux, LA	0–10 (5 inn)	Ruiz, A (5-9)	**Yoo, Molly (10-6)**		ESPN+		21–16	8–6
Apr. 7	Lamar		Swanner Field at Geo Sources Park • Thibodaux, LA	1–0	**McNeill, Audrey (9-6)**	Ruiz, Aaliyah (5-10)		ESPN+	66	22–16	9–6
Apr. 11	at South Alabama		Jaguar Field • Mobile, AL	2–3	Lackie, Olivia (14-6)	**McNeill, Audrey (9-7)**		ESPN+	331	22–17	
Apr. 14	at McNeese		Joe Miller Field at Cowgirl Diamond • Lake Charles, LA	0–6	Vallejo, Ashley (11-7)	**McNeill, Audrey (9-8)**		ESPN+		22–18	9–7
Apr. 15	at McNeese		Joe Miller Field at Cowgirl Diamond • Lake Charles, LA	0–8 (6 inn)	Tate, Whitney (13-3)	**Yoo, Molly (10-7)**		ESPN+	807	22–19	9–8
Apr. 15	at McNeese		Joe Miller Field at Cowgirl Diamond • Lake Charles, LA	4–5	Vallejo, Ashley (12-7)	**Yoo, Molly (10-8)**		ESPN+	787	22–20	9–9
Apr. 21	at Southeastern		North Oak Park • Hammond, LA	8–2	**McNeill, Audrey (10-8)**	Blanchard, Cera (14-6)	**VandenBout, Molly (1)**	ESPN+	219	23–20	10–9
Apr. 21	at Southeastern		North Oak Park • Hammond, LA	4–5	Ladner, KK (12-1)	**Yoo, Molly (10-9)**		ESPN+	276	23–21	10–10
Apr. 22	at Southeastern		North Oak Park • Hammond, LA	4–8	Ladner, KK (13-1)	**Yoo, Molly (10-10)**		ESPN+	302	23–22	10–11
Apr. 26	Southern		Swanner Field at Geo Sources Park • Thibodaux, LA	6–3	**Yoo, Molly (11-10)**	Chakirrious Parker (2-2)		ESPN+	203	24–22	
Apr. 28	Houston Christian		Swanner Field at Geo Sources Park • Thibodaux, LA	6–0	**McNeill, Audrey (11-8)**	Janes, Katy (6-11)		ESPN+	231	25–22	11–11
Apr. 28	Houston Christian		Swanner Field at Geo Sources Park • Thibodaux, LA	3–2 (8 inn)	**Yoo, Molly (12-10)**	Swanson, Lyndie (9-7)		ESPN+	231	26–22	12–11
Apr. 29	Houston Christian		Swanner Field at Geo Sources Park • Thibodaux, LA	2–1 (8 inn)	**McNeill, Audrey (12-8)**	Swanson, Lyndie (9-8)		ESPN+	201	27–22	13–11

Post-Season (2–2)

Southland Tournament (2–2)
Date	Opponent	(Seed)/Rank	Site/stadium	Score	Win	Loss	Save	TV	Attendance	Overall record	Tournament record
May 9	vs. (6) Northwestern State	(3)	Joe Miller Field at Cowgirl Diamond • Lake Charles, LA	2–8 (8 inn)	Seely, Kenzie (7-7)	**Yoo, Molly (12-11)**		ESPN+	457	27–23	0–1
May 10	vs. (7) Houston Christian	(3)	Joe Miller Field at Cowgirl Diamond • Lake Charles, LA	2–1	**McNeill, Audrey(13-8)**	Grofman, Ronni(5-6)		ESPN+		28–23	1–1
May 11	vs. (5) Texas A&M–Corpus Christi	(3)	Joe Miller Field at Cowgirl Diamond • Lake Charles, LA	1–0	**Yoo, Molly (13-11)**	Aholelei, Primrose (18-14)		ESPN+		29–23	2–1
May 12	vs. (4) Lamar	(3)	Joe Miller Field at Cowgirl Diamond • Lake Charles, LA	4–5	Ruiz, A (15-12)	**Yoo, Molly (13-12)**		ESPN+		29–24	2–2

Schedule source:*Rankings are based on the team's current ranking in the NFCA/USA Softball poll.
