= 2023 Southland Conference softball tournament =

- Teams: 7
- Format: Double-elimination tournament
- Finals site: Joe Miller Field; Lake Charles, Louisiana
- Champions: McNeese (9th title)
- Winning coach: James Landreneau (5th title)
- MVP: Reese Reyna (McNeese)
- Television: ESPN+

2023 Southland Conference softball standings
	Conf.						Overall
Team	W		L		T	PCT	W		L		T	PCT
McNeese ‍†‍‡‍^{y}	21	–	3	–	0	.875	47	–	16	–	0	.746
Southeastern Louisiana ‍‍‍	19	–	5	–	0	.792	47	–	14	–	0	.770
Nicholls ‍‍‍	13	–	11	–	0	.542	29	–	24	–	0	.547
Lamar ‍‍‍	12	–	12	–	0	.500	22	–	34	–	0	.393
Texas A&M–Corpus Christi ‍‍‍	11	–	13	–	0	.458	24	–	24	–	0	.500
Northwestern State ‍‍‍	10	–	14	–	0	.417	25	–	27	–	0	.481
Houston Christian ‍‍‍	9	–	15	–	0	.375	20	–	33	–	0	.377
Incarnate Word ‍‍‍	8	–	16	–	0	.333	16	–	30	–	1	.351
Texas A&M–Commerce* ‍‍‍	5	–	19	–	0	.208	9	–	39	–	0	.188
* Ineligible for the 2023 NCAA tournament due to transition from Division II
† – Conference champion ‡ – Tournament champion y – Invited to the NCAA tournament As of May 21, 2023; Rankings from NFCA/USA Today

The 2023 Southland Conference tournament was held at Joe Miller Field on the campus of McNeese State University in Lake Charles, Louisiana, from May 9 through 13, 2023. The tournament winner, McNeese, earned the Southland Conference's automatic bid to the 2023 NCAA Division I softball tournament. All games were broadcast on ESPN+.

== Format ==
The tournament was a 7 team double elimination format. The top seeded team, McNeese, received a bye in first round competition.

== Seeds ==
Teams were seeded by record within the conference, with a tie–breaker system to seed teams with identical conference records. The top seven teams in the conference qualify for the tournament. Tiebreakers were not needed in 2023.

Seed	School	Conference
1	McNeese	21–3
2	Southeastern Louisiana	19–5
3	Nicholls	13–11
4	Lamar	12–12
5	Texas A&M–Corpus Christi	11–13
6	Northwestern State	10–14
7	Houston Christian	9–15

- Incarnate Word and Texas A&M–Commerce did not qualify for the tournament. New Orleans does not sponsor a softball team.

== Tournament ==
Round	Game	Time*	Matchup	Score	Attendance	Notes	Television
First day – Tuesday, May 9, 2023
1	1	1:30 pm	No. 4 Lamar vs. No. 5 Texas A&M–Corpus Christi	2–3	Not recorded		ESPN+
1	2	4:25 pm	No. 2 Southeastern Louisiana vs. No. 7 Houston Christian	7–1	Not recorded	Rain delay; Game resumed at 7:35 pm	ESPN+
1	3	8:40 pm	No. 3 Nicholls vs. No. 6 Northwestern State	2–8	457	Start delayed due to rain	ESPN+
Second day – Wednesday, May 10, 2023
2	4	1:30 pm	No. 5 Texas A&M–Corpus Christi vs. No. 1 McNeese	1–2	Not recorded	Delayed; rain	ESPN+
2	5	5:32 pm	No. 2 Southeastern Louisiana vs. No. 6 Northwestern State	13–1^{(5)}	394	Game started 30 minutes after game 4 conclusion	ESPN+
Third day– Thursday, May 11, 2023
2	6	11:00 am	No. 7 Houston Christian vs. No. 3 Nicholls	1–2	Not recorded	Elimination game	ESPN+
2	7	1:30 pm	No. 4 Lamar vs. No. 6 Northwestern State	5–4	Not recorded	Elimination game	ESPN+
2	8	4:00 pm	No. 5 Texas A&M–Corpus Christi vs. No. 3 Nicholls	0–1	Not recorded	Elimination game	ESPN+
2	9	6:30 pm	No. 1 McNeese vs. No. 2 Southeastern Louisiana	6–2	528		ESPN+
Fourth day – Friday, May 12, 2023
3	10	11:00 pm	No. 3 Nicholls vs. No. 4 Lamar	4–5	Not recorded	Elimination Game	ESPN+
3	11	1:30 pm	No. 2 Southeastern Louisiana vs. No. 4 Lamar	8–0^{(5)}	363	Elimination Game	ESPN+
Championship – Saturday, May 13, 2023
4	12	12:00 pm	No. 1 McNeese vs. No. 2 Southeastern Louisiana	1– 0^{(8)}	607		ESPN+
4	13	2:30 pm	Rematch (if necessary)	–	Not necessary		ESPN+
*Game times in CDT. #-Rankings denote tournament seeding.

== Awards and honors ==
Tournament MVP: Reese Reyna, McNeese

All-Tournament Teams: Source:

Reese Reyna, McNeese - MVP
Mariana Torres, McNeese
Alayis Seneca, McNeese
Whitney Tate, McNeese
Ashley Vallejo, McNeese
Madison Rayner, Southeastern
Lexi Johnson, Southeastern
Audrey Greely, Southeastern
Ka’Lyn Watson, Southeastern
KK Ladner, Southeastern
Cameron Niedenthal, Lamar
Alexa Poche’, Nicholls

== See also ==
2023 Southland Conference baseball tournament
