= Manhattan Jaspers softball =

College softball team

- University: Manhattan University
- Head coach: Bridget Hurlman (3rd season)
- Conference: MAAC
- Location: Bronx, New York, US
- Home stadium: Gaelic Park
- Nickname: Jaspers
- Colors: Green and white

NCAA Tournament appearances
- 1999, 2021

Conference tournament championships
- 1999, 2021

Regular-season conference championships
- 1994, 2009

For information on all Manhattan University sports, see Manhattan Jaspers

The Manhattan Jaspers softball team represents Manhattan University for college softball in NCAA Division I. The team participates in the Metro Atlantic Athletic Conference (MAAC). The Jaspers are currently led by head coach Bridget Hurlman. The team plays its home games at Gaelic Park which is located on the college's campus.

== History ==
Manhattan has been a member of the Metro Atlantic Athletic Conference since its inception in 1980 and has fielded a softball team each year since 1987. Despite this, the Jaspers have managed to win the conference regular season championship only twice in that timespan, sharing titles in both 1994 and 2009 with Canisius and Fairfield respectively. Manhattan has won the conference tournament twice, doing so in 1999 and 2021. In doing so, they advanced to the NCAA Division I softball tournament both years.

In the 1999 NCAA Division I softball tournament, the Jaspers were defeated in their first game by Louisiana by a score of 15–0 in a game that ended via mercy rule after five innings. Manhattan was eliminated from the tournament after losing their second and final game of the tournament, this time in a 4–3 loss to LIU Brooklyn that went to extra innings.

The Jaspers returned to the tournament for the first time in 22 years in 2021 where they faced off against sixth ranked Arkansas and were defeated 8–0 innings via the mercy rule. The team was sent to the losers bracket where they were officially eliminated from the tournament by Stanford, losing an 11–2 contest.

Former head coach Cat Clifford departed from the program after the 2023 season. On June 6, 2023, it was announced by the NCAA that the Manhattan athletic program improperly certified 26 student athletes across six sports, including softball. The Jaspers' softball program was handed additional penalties after it was found that a former assistant coach improperly recruited players without completing a mandatory recruiting exam. The assistant also failed to cooperate with the investigation. The college was hit with several penalties, which included being placed on two years of probation, a $5,000 fine, a suspension for the softball head coach for the first two non-conference games of the 2024 season, a 16-day prohibition against all softball recruiting activities during the June/July 2023 contact period, a five year show cause penalty for the former assistant coach, and a vacation of all records in which the student athletes competed while ineligible. The MAAC released a statement in support of the NCAA's findings, while also maintaining they will continue to work with Manhattan to ensure the penalties are enforced.

Former Rhode Island head coach Bridget Hurlman was named as Manhattan's next head coach following the departure of Clifford.

=== Coaching history ===
Years	Coach	Record	%
1989–1995	Paul Mazzei	N/A	N/A
1996–2001	Susan Hannon	107–160–1	.401
2002	Lois J. Kahl	15–27	.357
2003–2004	Jennifer Fisher	24–66	.267
2005–2009	Meaghan Asselta	83–153	.352
2010–2021	Tom Pardalis	275–274–1	.501
2022–2023	Cat Clifford	26–67	.280
2024–present	Bridget Hurlman	38–109	.259

== Roster ==
2024 Manhattan Jaspers roster
Pitchers: 13 – Mollie Charest – Senior; 31 – Alexandra Hess – Freshman; 9 – Ava Metzger – Junior; 14 – Gabi Mills – Junior; 29 – Karissa Spring – Freshman; 16 – Makayla Veneziale – Junior; Catchers: 2 – Kaitlyn Flood – Graduate Student; 18 – Megan Hedlund – Senior; 3 – Gabriella Mazzotta – Graduate Student; 12 – Paige McLaughlin – Freshman; 21 – Anissa Villalobos – Junior; 22 – Maddy Weir – Sophomore	Infielders: 4 – Bella Cahueque – Sophomore; 11 – Jamie Falotico – Sophomore; 25 – Lily Fish – Senior; 30 – Kylie Flaherty – Freshman; 17 – Camryn O'Connor – Freshman; 99 – Lauren Rende – Graduate Student; 43 – Kristyn Smith – Senior; 24 – Grace Ware – Senior; Outfielders: 5 – Lindsey Hoag – Junior; 00 – Kaitlyn Holly – Senior; 15 – Kalyn Markel – Freshman; Utility: 8 – Sophia Kiseloski– Sophomore

== Season-by-season results ==
Record table
Season	Coach	Overall	Conference	Standing	Postseason
Manhattan Jaspers (Metro Atlantic Athletic Conference) (1987–present)
1987	N/A (Note: Coach names are unavailable for 1987 and 1988, although MAAC records indicate a team was fielded in those years.)	N/A	N/A	7th	
1988	N/A	N/A	N/A	8th	
1989	Paul Mazzei	N/A	N/A	6th	
1990	Paul Mazzei	N/A	N/A	9th	
1991	Paul Mazzei	N/A	N/A	4th	
1992	Paul Mazzei	N/A	N/A	N/A	
1993	Paul Mazzei	34–17	N/A	3rd	
1994	Paul Mazzei	N/A	N/A	T–1st	
1995	Paul Mazzei	N/A	N/A	2nd	
1996	Susan Hannon	N/A	N/A	4th	
1997	Susan Hannon	N/A	N/A	N/A	
1998	Susan Hannon	N/A	N/A	N/A	
1999	Susan Hannon	23–25	8–8	4th	NCAA Regionals
2000	Susan Hannon	21–31	7–9	T–6th	
2001	Susan Hannon	17–26	7–9	T–5th	
2002	Lois J. Kahl	15–27	6–19	6th	
2003	Jennifer Fisher	8–33	3–13	9th	
2004	Jennifer Fisher	16–33	9–7	T–3rd	
2005	Meaghan Asselta	22–25	9–7	T–4th	
2006	Meaghan Asselta	26–24	6–10	T–6th	
2007	Meaghan Asselta	4–42	3–13	9th	
2008	Meaghan Asselta	11–35	6–10	6th	
2009	Meaghan Asselta	20–27	11–5	T–1st	
2010	Tom Pardalis	25–23–1	9–7	4th	
2011	Tom Pardalis	25–23	12–4	T–2nd	
2012	Tom Pardalis	11–36	6–10	8th	
2013	Tom Pardalis	21–25	9–7	T–4th	
2014	Tom Pardalis	26–29	10–10	6th	
2015	Tom Pardalis	26–20	13–7	T–3rd	
2016	Tom Pardalis	30–21	14–6	2nd	
2017	Tom Pardalis	34–21	13–7	T–3rd	
2018	Tom Pardalis	28–25	10–10	5th	
2019	Tom Pardalis	20–30 (Note: Records vacated due to ineligible player.)	7–13	7th	
2020	Tom Pardalis	6–6	0–0	N/A	Season cut short due to COVID-19 pandemic
2021	Tom Pardalis	22–16	17–13	6th	NCAA Regionals
2022	Cat Clifford	13–30	7–11	8th	
2023	Cat Clifford	13–35	8–12	9th	
2024	Bridget Hurlman	13–37	10–14	8th	
2025	Bridget Hurlman	10–35	7–19	11th	
2026	Bridget Hurlman	15–37	10–18	11th	
Total:		555–794–2 (.412) (Note: Overall records are unavailable from 1987 to 1992, and from 1994 to 1998. Conference records are unavailable from 1987 to 1998. Conference finishing position in 1992, 1997, and 1998 is unavailable. All other finishing positions are available via MAAC record book.)			
National champion Postseason invitational champion Conference regular season champion Conference regular season and conference tournament champion Division regular season champion Division regular season and conference tournament champion Conference tournament champion

== See also ==
- List of NCAA Division I softball programs
