= Husky Field (softball) =

Softball stadium in Houston, Texas, US

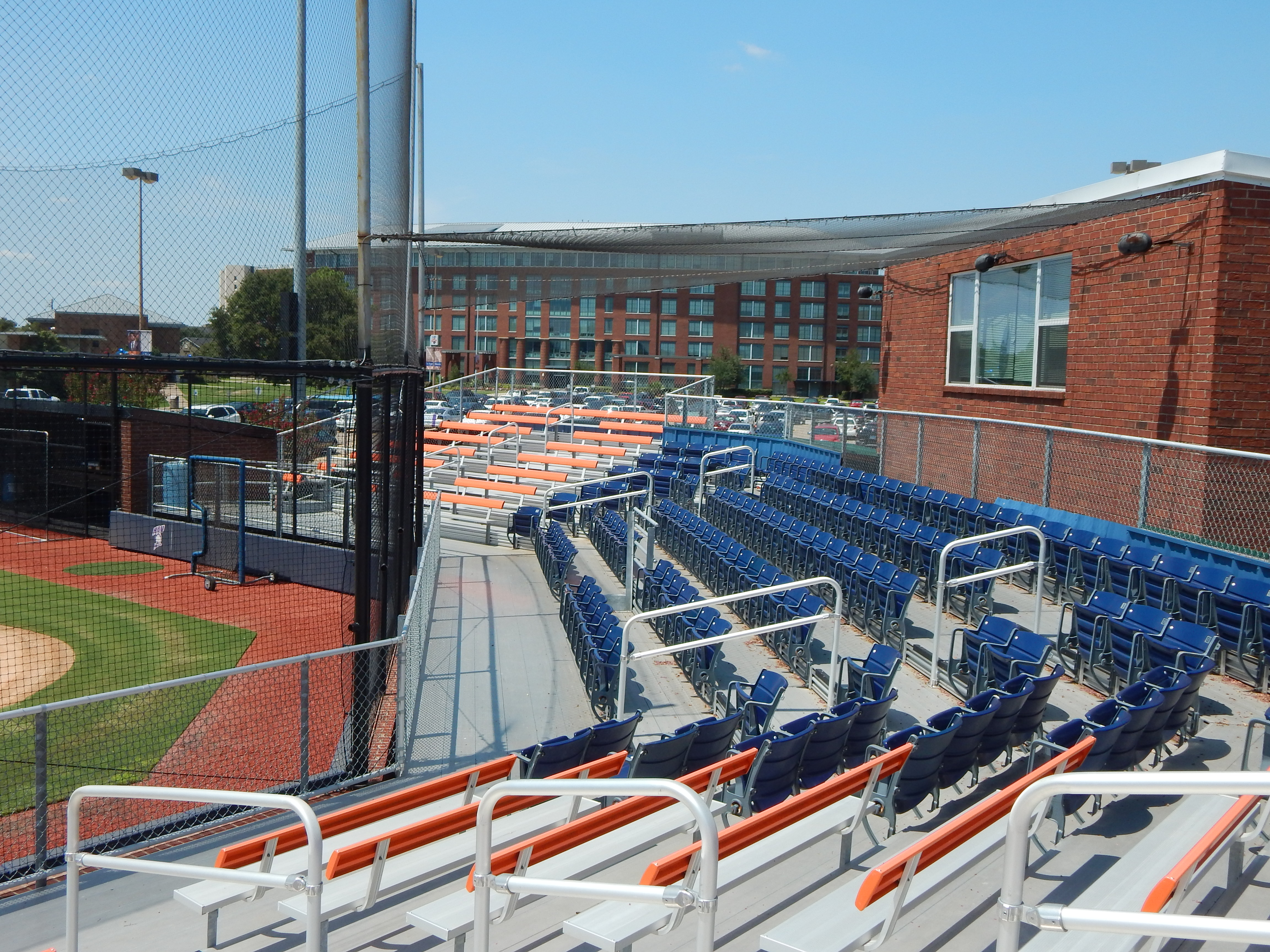
- Grandstands at Husky Field (Softball)
- Interactive map of Husky Field
- Location: Beechnut Street and Bonhomme Road (across from Husky Field baseball stadium), Houston, Texas
- Coordinates: 29°41′31.7″N 95°30′52.4″W
- Owner: Houston Christian University
- Operator: Houston Christian University
- Seating type: Chairback and bleacher back seats
- Capacity: 300
- Surface: Grass
- Scoreboard: Electronic
- Record attendance: 548; April 30, 2011 vs. UH-Victoria (both games of DH); April 21, 2012 vs. Texas A&M-Corpus Christi
- Field size: Left Field: 200 ft Center Field: 218 ft Right Field: 200 ft

Construction
- Built: 1993
- Opened: April 1, 1993

Tenant
- Houston Christian Huskies softball (NCAA) (1993-Present)

Husky Field is the home stadium for the NCAA Division I Houston Christian Huskies softball team. Located at the corner of Beechnut Street and Bonhomme Road at Campus Gate 3 and across from the similarly named Husky Field baseball stadium on the campus of Houston Christian University, the stadium features chairback and bleacher back seating for 300 fans. The stadium has bullpens, dugouts, a press box, enclosed hitting area, and an electronic scoreboard.

Admission to Houston Baptist Husky softball games is free.

The initial home game was played in 1993.

Husky Field (softball) Pictures
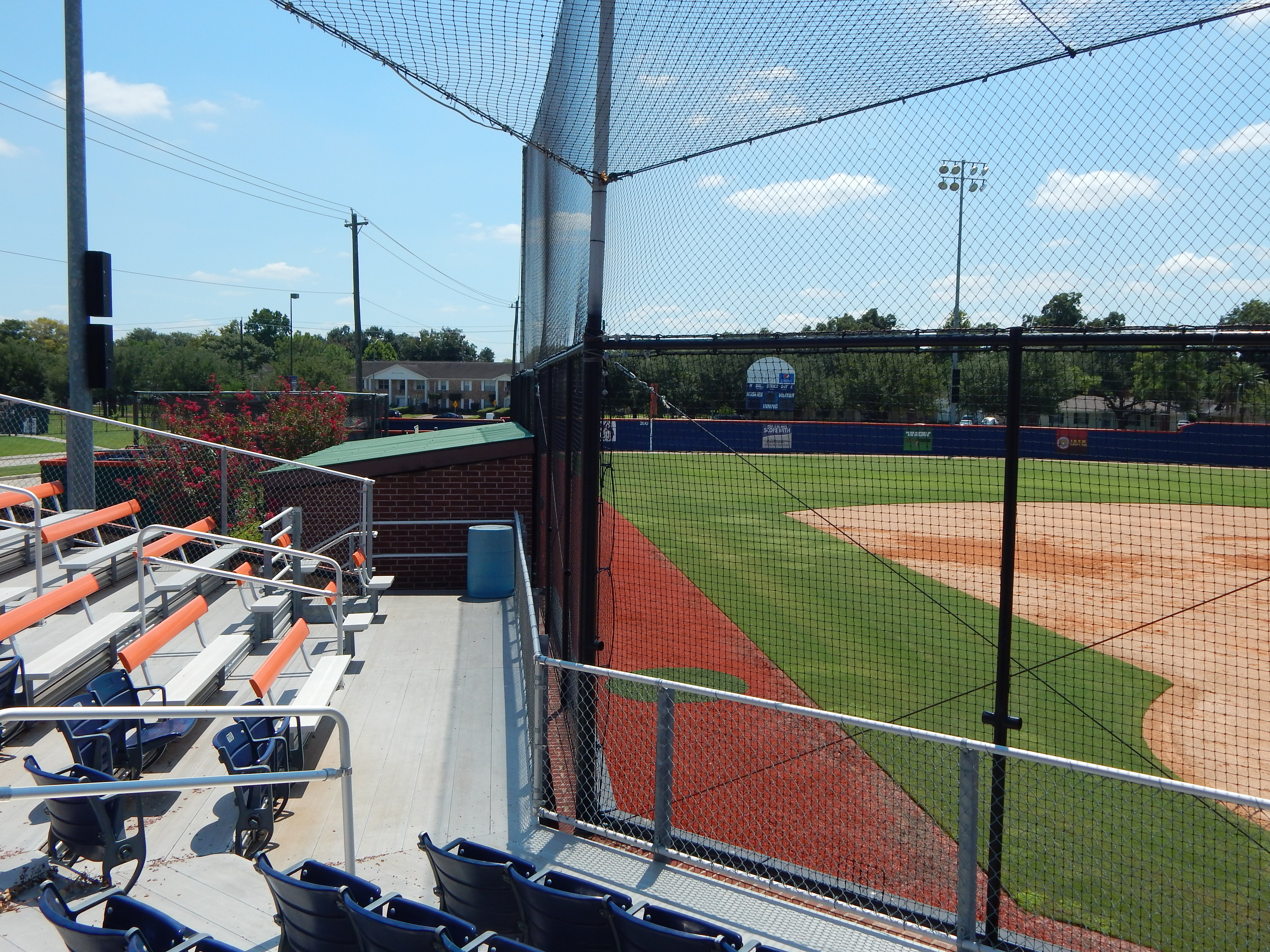
Left field from the grandstands at Husky Field - Softball

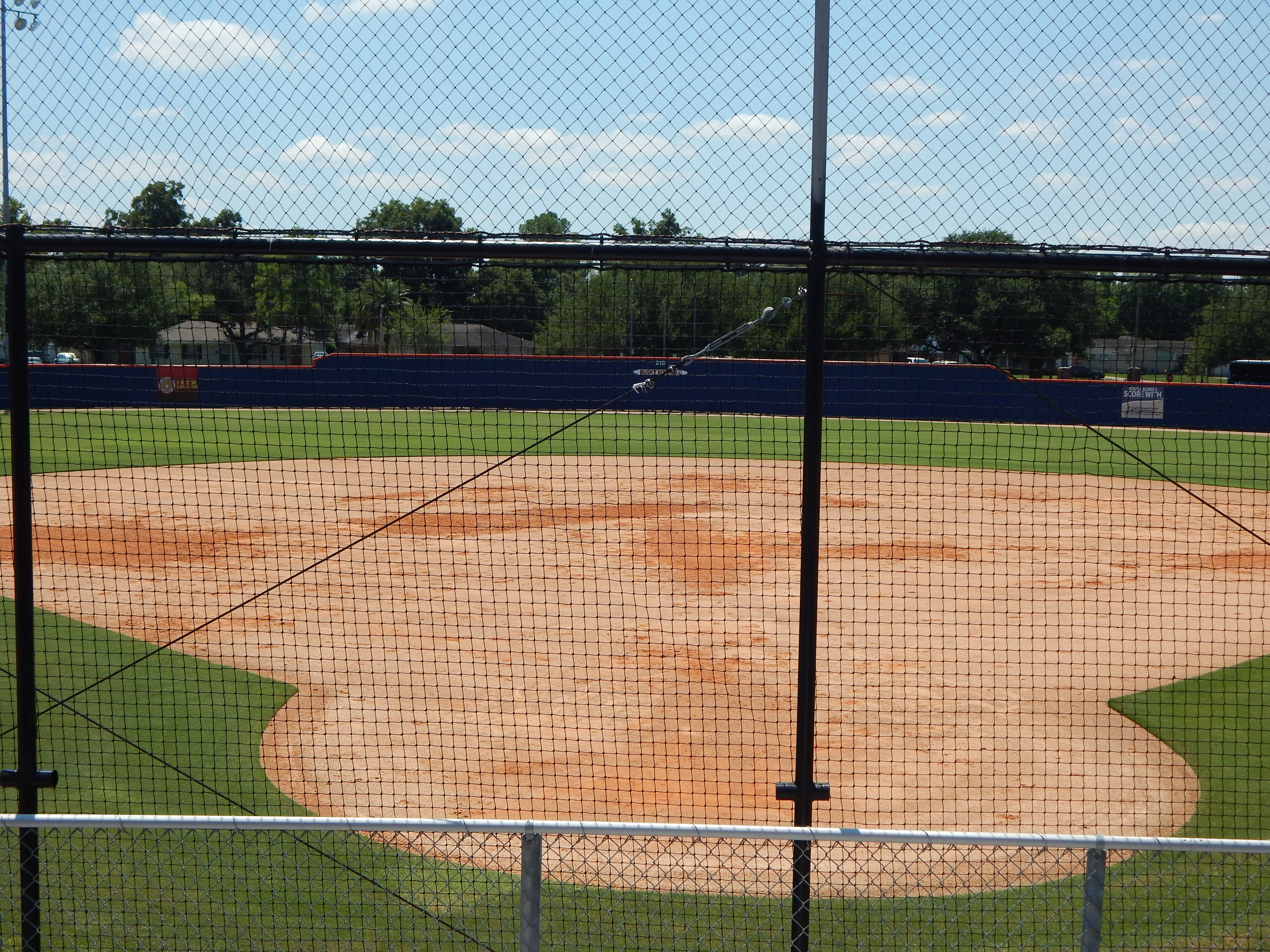
Center field from grandstands at Husky Field - Softball

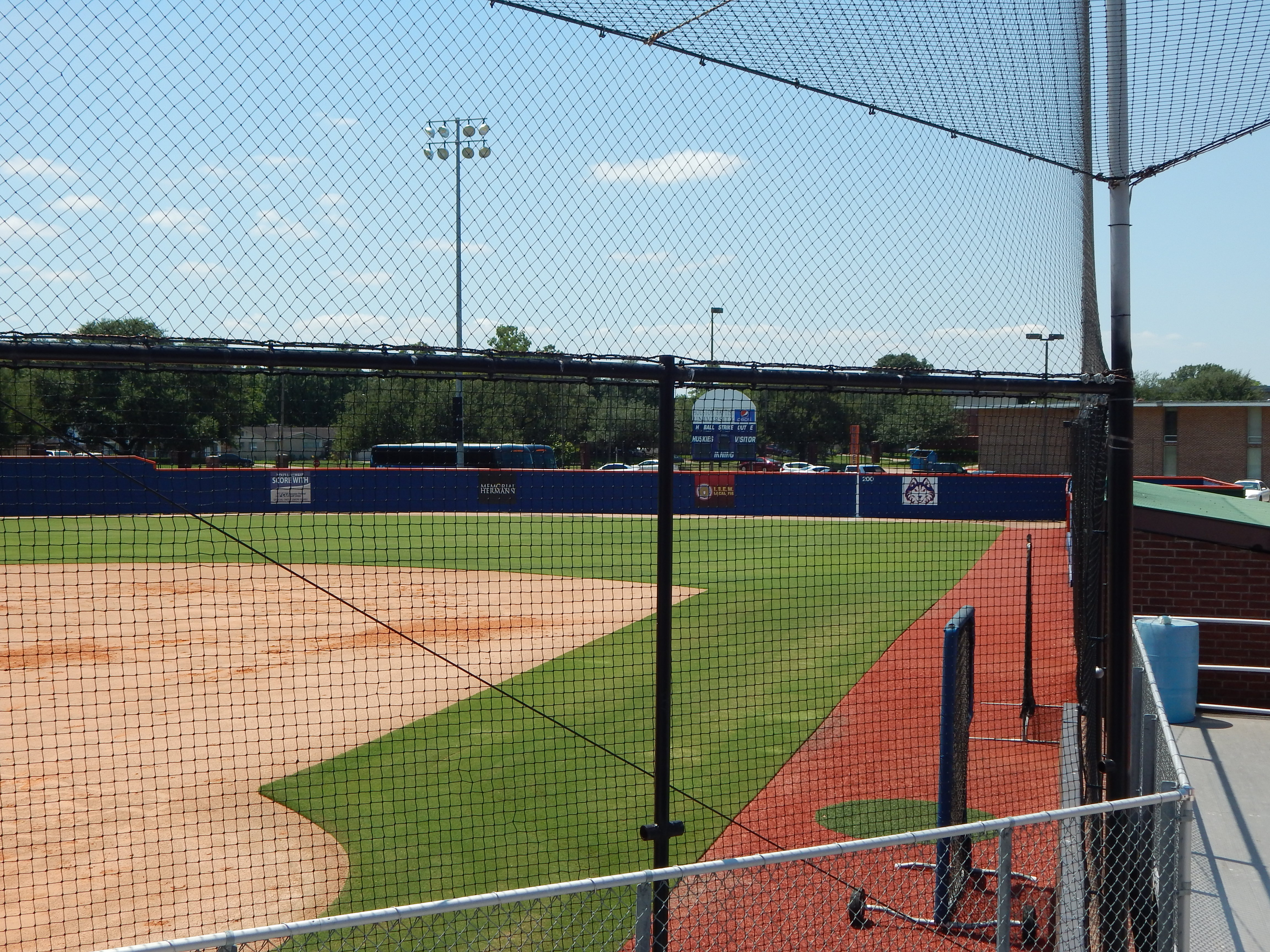
Right field from grandstands at Husky Field - Softball

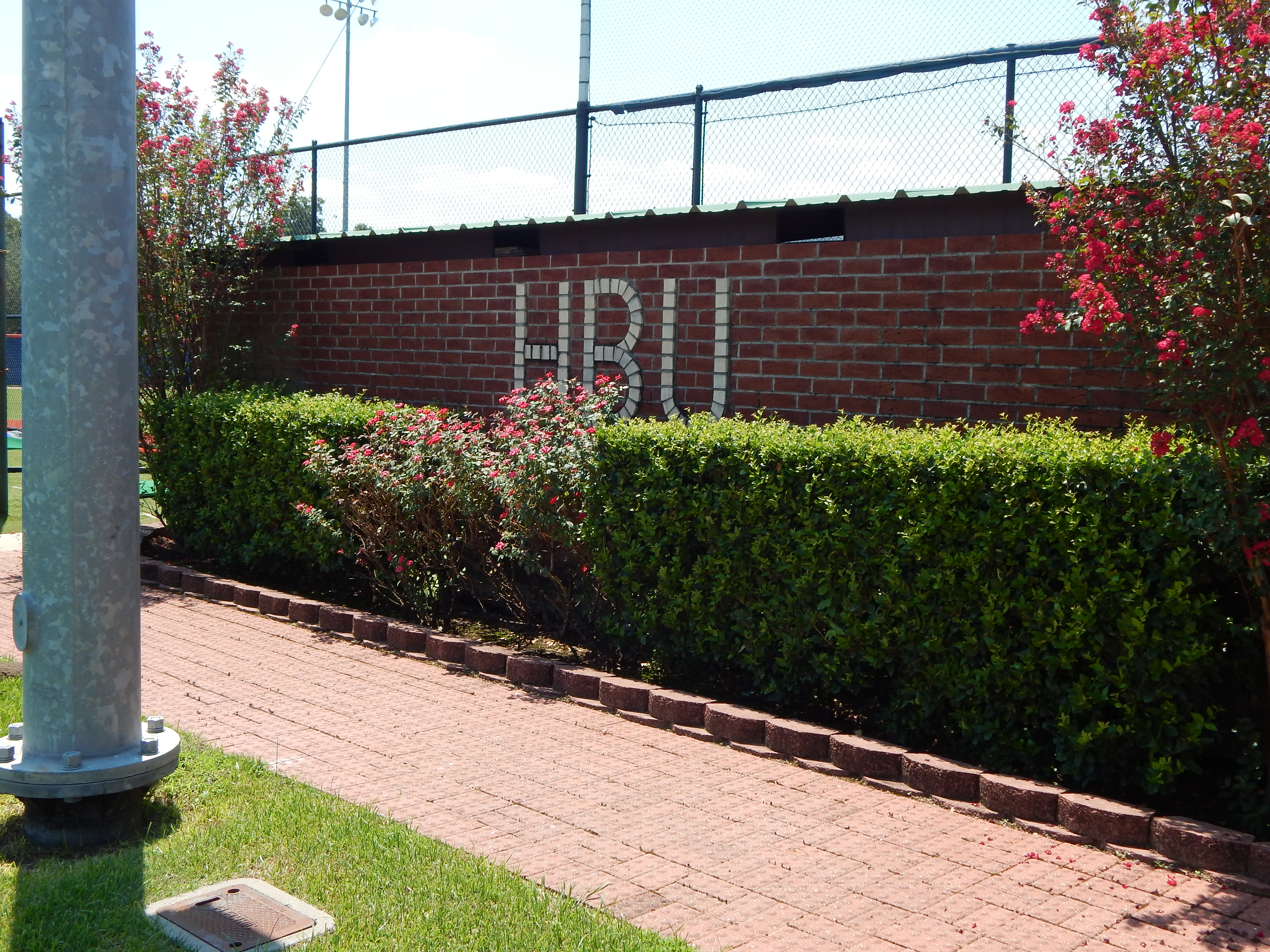
Exterior view at left field entrance of Husky Field - Softball

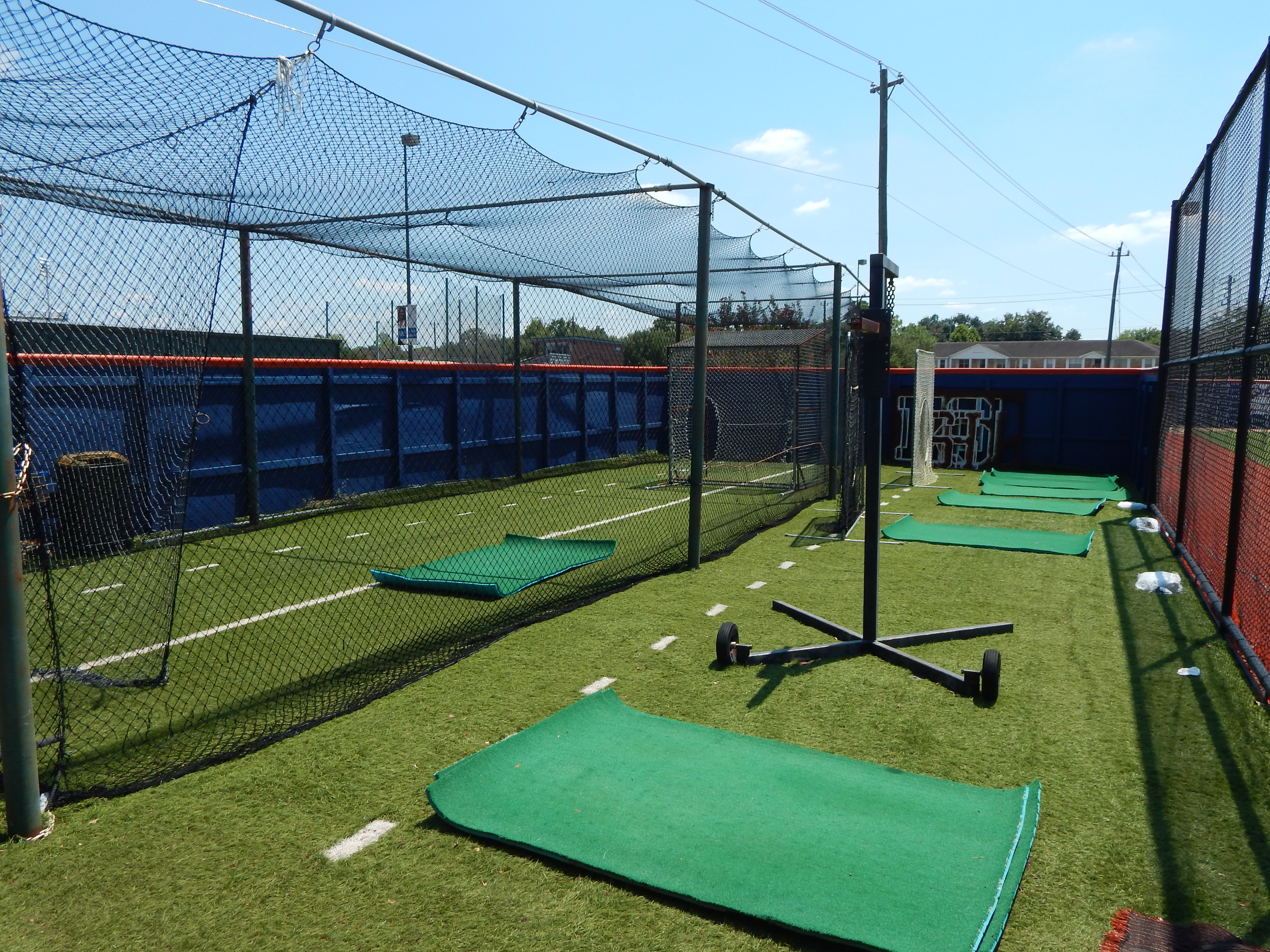
Practice facility at Husky Field - Softball
