= 2021 Central Arkansas Sugar Bears softball team =

American college softball season

2021 Central Arkansas Sugar Bears softball
- Conference: Southland Conference
- Record: 37–19 (21–6 Southland)
- Head coach: David Kuhn (13th season)
- Assistant coaches: Jenny Parsons; Chris Watford
- Home stadium: Farris Field

2021 Southland Conference softball standings
	Conf.				Overall
Team	W		L	PCT	W		L	PCT
Stephen F. Austin ‍†‍‍	25	–	2	.926	35	–	12	.745
Central Arkansas ‍‍‍	21	–	6	.778	37	–	19	.661
McNeese State ‍‍‡‍^{y}	18	–	9	.667	35	–	26	.574
Northwestern State ‍‍‍	16	–	11	.593	24	–	22	.522
Southeastern Louisiana ‍‍‍	14	–	10	.583	28	–	23	.549
Houston Baptist ‍‍‍	15	–	12	.556	22	–	17	.564
Sam Houston State ‍‍‍	14	–	13	.519	19	–	31	.380
Abilene Christian ‍‍‍	10	–	17	.370	14	–	33	.298
Incarnate Word ‍‍‍	9	–	18	.333	16	–	27	.372
Texas A&M–Corpus Christi ‍‍‍	8	–	16	.333	18	–	30	.375
Nicholls ‍‍‍	5	–	22	.185	12	–	28	.300
Lamar ‍‍‍	4	–	23	.148	8	–	43	.157
† – Conference champion ‡ – Tournament champion y – Invited to the NCAA tournament As of May 22, 2021; Rankings from NFCA

The 2021 Central Arkansas Sugar Bears softball team represented University of Central Arkansas during the 2021 NCAA Division I softball season. The Sugar Bears played their home games at Farris Field and were led by thirteenth year head coach David Kuhn. They were members of the Southland Conference.

== Preseason ==
=== Southland Conference Coaches Poll ===
The Southland Conference Coaches Poll was released on February 5, 2021. Central Arkansas was picked to finish fifth in the Southland Conference with 162 votes and one first place vote.

Coaches poll
Predicted finish	Team	Votes (1st place)
1	Stephen F. Austin	235 (17)
2	McNeese State	217 (4)
3	Southeastern Louisiana	183
4	Sam Houston State	172 (1)
5	Central Arkansas	162 (1)
6	Northwestern State	156 (1)
7	Nicholls	131
8	Lamar	86
9	Abilene Christian	82
10	Houston Baptist	81
11	Texas A&M–Corpus Christi	47
12	Incarnate Word	32

=== Preseason All-Southland team ===
==== First Team ====
- Kaylyn Shephard (UCA, R-SR, 1st Base)
- Cayla Joens (NSU, JR, 2nd Base)
- Cylla Hall (UCA, R-SR, 3rd Base)
- Cori McCrary (MCNS, SR, Shortstop)
- Ella Manzer (SELA, SR, Catcher)
- Samantha Bradley (ACU, R-SR, Designated Player)
- Linsey Tomlinson (ACU, R-SR, Outfielder)
- Kaylee Lopez (MCNS, SO, Outfielder)
- Elise Vincent (NSU, SR, Outfielder)
- Madisen Blackford (SELA, SR, Outfielder)
- Megan McDonald (SHSU, SR, Outfielder)
- Kayla Beaver (UCA, R-FR, Pitcher)
- Kassidy Wilbur (SFA, JR, Pitcher)
- E. C. Delafield (NSU, JR, Utility)

==== Second Team ====
- Shaylon Govan (SFA, SO, 1st Base)
- Brooke Malia (SHSU, SR, 2nd Base)
- Bryana Novegil (SFA, SR, 2nd Base)
- Caitlin Garcia (NICH, JR, 3rd Base)
- Alex Hudspeth (SFA, JR, Shortstop)
- Alexis Perry (NSU, SO, Catcher)
- Bailey Richards (SFA, SR, Catcher)
- Caitlyn Brockway (HBU, SO, Designated Player)
- Reagan Sperling (UCA, R-JR, Outfielder)
- Alayis Seneca (MCNS, SO, Outfielder)
- Hayley Barbazon (NSU, SR, Outfielder)
- Saleen Flores (MCNS, SO, Pitcher)
- MC Comeaux (SELA, FR, Pitcher)
- Sammi Thomas (TAMUCC, SO, Utility)

=== National Softball Signing Day ===
Player	Position	Hometown	Previous Team
Bella Barnes	Infielder	Baton Rouge, Louisiana	Central HS
Jorde Chartland	Pitcher/Utility	Weyburn, Saskatchewan, Canada	Weyburn Comprehensive
Reese Curry	Infielder/Utility	Oskaloosa, Kansas	Oskaloosa HS
Regan Curry	Infielder/Utility	Oskaloosa, Kansas	Oskaloosa HS
Kylie Griffin	Infielder	Greenbrier, Arkansas	Greenbrier HS
Emily Perry	Infielder	Bentonville, Arkansas	Bentonville HS
Graci Thomas	Infielder	Morrilton, Arkansas	Morrilton HS

== Roster ==
2021 Central Arkansas Sugar Bears roster
Pitchers: 19 Kayla Beaver - Redshirt Freshman; 20 Katelyn McMahan - Freshman; 30 Rio Sanchez - Senior; Outfielders: 1 Tremere Harris - Freshman; 3 Jenna Wildeman - Redshirt Freshman; 4 Gabbi Scott - Freshman; 5 Megan Corwnover - Redshirt Freshman; 7 Reagan Sperling - Redshirt Junior; 23 Callie Eary - Redshirt Sophomore; Utilities: 15 Kristen Whitehouse - Freshman; 26 Lindsey Williams - Redshirt Junior	Catchers: 6 Tylar Vernon - Redshirt Sophomore; 27 Emily Sampson - Redshirt Freshman; Infielders: 2 Mary Kate Brown - Redshirt Freshman; 9 Morgan Nelson - Redshirt Freshman; 11 Erin Acors - Senior; 13 Kaylyn Shepherd - Redshirt Senior; 14 Jordan Johnson - Redshirt Sophomore; 17 Erin Blackburn - Redshirt Sophomore; 18 Lexi McClellan - Redshirt Junior; 22 Jaylee Engelkes - Redshirt Sophomore; 24 Cylla Hill - Redshirt Senior

=== Coaching staff ===
2021 Central Arkansas Sugar Bears coaching staff
- David Kuhn – Head coach – 13th year
- Jenny Parsons – Associate head coach – 9th year
- Chris Watford – Assistant head coach – 1st year
- Kayla Lucas – Volunteer assistant coach

== Schedule and results ==
Legend
	Central Arkansas win
	Central Arkansas loss
	Postponement/Cancellation
**Bold**	Central Arkansas team member

2021 Central Arkansas Sugar Bears softball game log
Regular season (34-17)

February (6-7)
Date	Opponent	Rank	Site/stadium	Score	Win	Loss	Save	TV	Attendance	Overall record	SLC Record
Tiger Classic
Feb. 12	vs. No. 25 Duke		Tiger Field • Baton Rouge, LA	**L** 2-6	Butler (1-0)	**Johnson** (0-1)	Walters (1)		76	0-1	
Feb. 13	vs. No. 25 Duke		Tiger Field • Baton Rouge, LA	**L** 5-7	Davidson (1-0)	**Sanchez** (0-1)	Butler (1)		72	0-2	
Feb. 13	vs. Kansas		Tiger Field • Baton Rouge, LA	**L** 2-4	Goff (1-0)	**Beaver** (0-1)	None		86	0-3	
Texas A&M Invitational
Feb. 20	vs. Texas Tech		Davis Diamond • College Station, TX	**W** 6-1	**Beaver** (1-1)	Zoch (1-1)	None		306	1-3	
Feb. 20	at Texas A&M		Davis Diamond • College Station, TX	**L** 0-9 (5 inns)	Herzog (1-0)	**Johnson** (0-2)	None	SECN+	306	1-4	
Feb. 21	vs. Colorado		Davis Diamond • College Station, TX	**W** 4-0	**Sanchez** (1-1)	Cabral (0-1)	None		95	2-4	
Feb. 21	vs. Texas Tech		Davis Diamond • College Station, TX	**W** 5-0	**Johnson** (1-5)	Zoch (1-2)	None		100	3-4	
Feb. 22	at Texas A&M		Davis Diamond • College Station, TX	**L** 0-22	Poynter (1-0)	**Beaver** (1-2)	Broadus (1)	SECN+	159	3-5	
Feb. 23	at No. 11 LSU		Tiger Field • Baton Rouge, LA	**L** 0-3	Wickersham (2-1)	**Sanchez** (1-2)	None	SECN+	156	3-6	
Feb. 23	at No. 11 LSU		Tiger Field • Baton Rouge, LA	**L** 0-2	Kilponen (1-1)	**Johnson** (1-3)	None	SECN+	327	3-7	
Michelle Short Memorial Classic
Feb. 25	Omaha		Farris Field • Conway, AR	**W** 9-1	**Sanchez** (2-2)	Hampton (0-3)	None		84	4-7	
Feb. 25	Missouri State		Farris Field • Conway, AR	**W** 5-0	**Beaver** (2-2)	Hunsaker (2-1)	None		88	5-7	
Feb. 27	Western Illinois		Farris Field • Conway, AR	**W** 9-1	**Sanchez** (3-2)	Carlin (1-2)	None		102	6-7	

March (13-3)
Date	Opponent	Rank	Site/stadium	Score	Win	Loss	Save	TV	Attendance	Overall record	SLC Record
Mar. 3	Arkansas–Monticello		Farris Field • Conway, AR	**W** 8-0 (5 inns)	**Beaver** (3-2)	Franks (0-2)	None		113	7-7	
Adam Brown Memorial Shamrock Classic
Mar. 5	Mississippi Valley State		Farris Field • Conway, AR	**W** 10-0 (5 inns)	**Johnson** (2-3)	Page (0-3)	None		92	8-7	
Mar. 5	Arkansas–Pine Bluff		Farris Field • Conway, AR	**W** 10-1 (5 inns)	**Beaver** (4-2)	Hubbard (0-2)	None		104	9-7	
Mar. 6	Arkansas–Pine Bluff		Farris Field • Conway, AR	**W** 8-0 (5 inns)	**Sanchez** (4-2)	Smith (0-2)	None		109	10-7	
Mar. 6	Western Michigan		Farris Field • Conway, AR	**W** 11-0 (5 inns)	**Johnson** (3-3)	Galloway (1-3)	None		187	11-7	
Mar. 8	Lyon		Farris Field • Conway, AR	**W** 3-1	**Beaver** (5-2)	Platt (2-5)	None		86	12-7	
Mar. 9	No. 19 Arkansas		Farris Field • Conway, AR	**L** 1-4	Haff (10-1)	**Johnson** (3-4)	None	ESPN+	755	12-8	
Mar. 12	at McNeese State		Joe Miller Field at Cowgirl Diamond • Lake Charles, LA	**L** 0-1	Tate (2-5)	**Beaver** (5-3)	None	ESPN+	257	12-9	0-1
Mar. 13	at McNeese State		Joe Miller Field at Cowgirl Diamond • Lake Charles, LA	**W** 5-4	**Beaver** (6-3)	Vallejo (1-4)	None		207	13-9	1-1
Mar. 13	at McNeese State		Joe Miller Field at Cowgirl Diamond • Lake Charles, LA	**L** 3-5	Tate (3-5)	**Sanchez** (4-3)	None		207	13-10	1-2
Mar. 19	at Abilene Christian		Poly Wells Field • Abilene, TX	**W** 7-0	**Beaver** (7-3)	Bradley (3-8)	None		250	14-10	2-2
Mar. 19	at Abilene Christian		Poly Wells Field • Abilene, TX	**W** 8-0 (6 inns)	**Johnson** (4-4)	White (3-7)	None		250	15-10	3-2
Mar. 20	at Abilene Christian		Poly Wells Field • Abilene, TX	**W** 15-2 (5 inns)	**Beaver** (8-3)	Bradley (3-9)	None		250	16-10	4-2
Mar. 26	Sam Houston State		Farris Field • Conway, AR	**W** 11-1 (5 inns)	**Beaver** (9-3)	Dunn (4-4)	None		218	17-10	5-2
Mar. 26	Sam Houston State		Farris Field • Conway, AR	**W** 1-0	**Johnson** (5-4)	Vento (3-3)	None		250	18-10	6-2
Mar. 27	Sam Houston State		Farris Field • Conway, AR	**W** 5-1	**Johnson** (6-4)	Vento (3-4)	None		202	19-10	7-2
Mar. 30	Memphis		Farris Field • Conway, AR	Game postponed to April 27							

April (11–7)
Date	Opponent	Rank	Site/stadium	Score	Win	Loss	Save	TV	Attendance	Overall record	SLC Record
Apr. 2	at Northwestern State		Lady Demon Diamond • Natchitoches, LA	**W** 3-1	**Johnson** (7-4)	Howell (5-4)	None		250	20-10	8-2
Apr. 2	at Northwestern State		Lady Demon Diamond • Natchitoches, LA	**W** 4-0	**Beaver** (10-3)	Delafield (5-2)	None		250	21-10	9-2
Apr. 3	at Northwestern State		Lady Demon Diamond • Natchitoches, LA	**W** 4-3	**Beaver** (11-3)	Rhoden (4-3)	**Johnson** (1)		203	22-10	10-2
Apr. 6	at RV Ole Miss		Ole Miss Softball Complex • Oxford, MS	**L** 1-4	Borgen (8-4)	**Beaver** (11-4)	Diederich (1)	SECN+	201	22-11	
Apr. 7	at Mississippi State		Nusz Park • Mississippi State, MS	**L** 3-4	Willis (11-4)	**Beaver** (11-5)	None	SECN+	66	22-12	
Apr. 9	Nicholls		Farris Field • Conway, AR	**W** 14-2	**Johnson** (8-4)	Danehower (3-5)	None		125	23-12	11-2
Apr. 9	Nicholls		Farris Field • Conway, AR	**W** 2-0	**Beaver** (12-5)	Moon (1-5)	None		152	24-12	12-2
Apr. 10	Nicholls		Farris Field • Conway, AR	**W** 7-1	**Beaver** (13-5)	Westbrook (2-6)	**Johnson** (2)		132	25-12	13-2
Apr. 17	at Houston Baptist		Husky Field • Houston, TX	**W** 5-2	**Johnson** (9-4)	Patak (5-8)	None		50	26-12	14-2
Apr. 17	at Houston Baptist		Husky Field • Houston, TX	**L** 0-1	Swanson (6-0)	**Beaver** (13-6)	None		50	26-13	14-3
Apr. 18	at Houston Baptist		Husky Field • Houston, TX	**L** 1-2	Patak (5-8)	**Johnson** (9-4)	None			26-14	14-4
Apr. 21	at No. 8 Arkansas		Bogle Field • Fayetteville, AR	**L** 6-7 (8 inns)	Haff (20-3)	**Johnson** (9-6)	None	SECN+	873	26-15	
Apr. 24	Stephen F. Austin		Farris Field • Conway, AR	**L** 0-3	Wilbur (24-3)	**Johnson** (9-7)	None		119	26-16	14-5
Apr. 24	Stephen F. Austin		Farris Field • Conway, AR	**W** 7-2	**Beaver** (14-6)	Chism (3-1)	None		206	27-16	15-5
Apr. 25	Stephen F. Austin		Farris Field • Conway, AR	**L** 0-6	Wilbur (25-3)	**Sanchez** (4-4)	None		136	27-17	15-6
Apr. 27	Memphis		Farris Field • Conway, AR	**W** 4-3 (9 inns)	**Beaver** (15-6)	Ellett (2-9)	None		107	28-17	
Apr. 30	at Southeastern Louisiana		North Oak Park • Hammond, LA	**W** 6-0	**Johnson** (10-7)	Zumo (15-4)	None	ESPN+	224	29-17	16-6
Apr. 30	at Southeastern Louisiana		North Oak Park • Hammond, LA	**W** 5-0	**Beaver** (16-6)	Hannabas (2-5)	None	ESPN+	224	30-17	17-6

May (4-0)
Date	Opponent	Rank	Site/stadium	Score	Win	Loss	Save	TV	Attendance	Overall record	SLC Record
May 1	at Southeastern Louisiana		North Oak Park • Hammond, LA	**W** 7-6 (10 inns)	**Beaver** (17-6)	Zumo (15-5)	None	ESPN+	245	31-17	18-6
May 7	Lamar		Farris Field • Conway, AR	**W** 7-0	**Johnson** (11-7)	Ruiz (3-9)	None		219	32-17	19-6
May 8	Lamar		Farris Field • Conway, AR	**W** 12-1 (5 inns)	**Beaver** (18-6)	Mixon (3-16)	None		218	33-17	20-6
May 8	Lamar		Farris Field • Conway, AR	**W** 11-2 (6 inns)	**Engelkes** (1-0)	Ruiz (3-10)	None		218	34-17	21-6

Post-Season (3-2)

Southland Tournament (0-0)
Date	Opponent	(Seed)/Rank	Site/stadium	Score	Win	Loss	Save	TV	Attendance	Overall record	Tournament record
May 13	vs. (3) McNeese State	(2)	North Oak Park • Hammond, LA	**L** 5-6	Tate (12-7)	**Johnson** (11-8)	Flores (3)	ESPN+	335	34-18	
May 14	vs. (5) Southeastern Louisiana	(2)	North Oak Park • Hammond, LA	**W** 2-1	**Beaver** (19-6)	Zumo (16-7)	None	ESPN+	275	35-18	
May 14	vs. (4) Northwestern State	(2)	North Oak Park • Hammond, LA	**W** 5-2	**Beaver** (20-6)	Delafield (12-5)	None	ESPN+	339	36-18	
May 15	vs. (1) Stephen F. Austin	(2)	North Oak Park • Hammond, LA	**W** 5-4	**Beaver** (21-6)	Wilbur (30-6)	None	ESPN+	307	37-18	
May 15	vs. (3) McNeese State	(2)	North Oak Park • Hammond, LA	**L** 0-1	Edwards (9-2)	**Johnson** (11-9)	Tate (3)	ESPN+	345	37-19	

Schedule source:

*Rankings are based on the team's current ranking in the NFCA/USA Softball poll.

== Postseason ==
=== Conference accolades ===
- Player of the Year: Kassidy Wilbur – SFA
- Hitter of the Year: Shaylon Govan – SFA
- Pitcher of the Year: Kassidy Wilbur – SFA
- Freshman of the Year: Jenna Wildeman – UCA
- Newcomer of the Year: Jenna Edwards – MCNS
- Coach of the Year: Nicole Dickson – SFA

All Conference First Team

- Shaylon Govan (SFA)
- Bryana Novegil (SFA)
- Haylee Brinlee (MCNS)
- Cori McCrary (MCNS)
- Heidi Jaquez (HBU)
- E. C. Delafield (NSU)
- Mackenzie Bennett (SFA)
- Jenna Wildeman (UCA)
- Megan McDonald (SHSU)
- Aeriyl Mass (SELA)
- Kayla Beaver (UCA)
- Kassidy Wilbur (SFA)

All Conference Second Team

- Kaylyn Shephard (UCA)
- Mary Kate Brown (UCA)
- Lindsey Rizzo (SELA)
- Camryn Middlebrook (SFA)
- Hannah Scheaffer (SHSU)
- Gaby Garcia (SFA)
- Kaylee Lopez (MCNS)
- Donelle Johnson (ACU)
- Jil Poullard (MCNS)
- Audrey Greely (SELA)
- Jordan Johnson (UCA)
- Whitney Tate (MCNS)

All Conference Third Team

- Caitlyn Brockway (HBU)
- Cayla Jones (NSU)
- Alex Hedspeth (SFA)
- Ashlyn Reavis (NICH)
- Chloe Gomez (MCNS)
- Jasie Roberts (HBU)
- Anna Rodenberg (SELA)
- Kaitlyn St. Clair (NSU)
- Sheridan Fisher (SHSU)
- Pal Egan (TAMUCC)
- Lyndie Swanson (HBU)
- Heather Zumo (SELA)
