= Oskaloosa High School =

Oskaloosa High School may refer to:

== United States ==
- Oskaloosa High School (Iowa) in Oskaloosa, Iowa
- Oskaloosa High School (Kansas) in Oskaloosa, Kansas
