= 2021 Nicholls Colonels softball team =

American college softball season

2021 Nicholls Colonels softball
- Conference: Southland Conference
- Record: 12–28 (5–22 Southland)
- Head coach: Angel Santiago (10th season)
- Assistant coach: Jessica Seamon
- Home stadium: Swanner Field at Geo Surfaces Park

2021 Southland Conference softball standings
	Conf.				Overall
Team	W		L	PCT	W		L	PCT
Stephen F. Austin ‍†‍‍	25	–	2	.926	35	–	12	.745
Central Arkansas ‍‍‍	21	–	6	.778	37	–	19	.661
McNeese State ‍‍‡‍^{y}	18	–	9	.667	35	–	26	.574
Northwestern State ‍‍‍	16	–	11	.593	24	–	22	.522
Southeastern Louisiana ‍‍‍	14	–	10	.583	28	–	23	.549
Houston Baptist ‍‍‍	15	–	12	.556	22	–	17	.564
Sam Houston State ‍‍‍	14	–	13	.519	19	–	31	.380
Abilene Christian ‍‍‍	10	–	17	.370	14	–	33	.298
Incarnate Word ‍‍‍	9	–	18	.333	16	–	27	.372
Texas A&M–Corpus Christi ‍‍‍	8	–	16	.333	18	–	30	.375
Nicholls ‍‍‍	5	–	22	.185	12	–	28	.300
Lamar ‍‍‍	4	–	23	.148	8	–	43	.157
† – Conference champion ‡ – Tournament champion y – Invited to the NCAA tournament As of May 22, 2021; Rankings from NFCA

The 2021 Nicholls Colonels softball team represented Nicholls State University during the 2021 NCAA Division I softball season. The Colonels played their home games at Swanner Field in Geo Surfaces Park and were led by tenth-year head coach Angel Santiago. They were members of the Southland Conference.

== Preseason ==
=== Southland Conference Coaches Poll ===
The Southland Conference Coaches Poll was released on February 5, 2021. Nicholls was picked to finish seventh in the Southland Conference with 131 votes.

Coaches poll
Predicted finish	Team	Votes (1st place)
1	Stephen F. Austin	235 (17)
2	McNeese State	217 (4)
3	Southeastern Louisiana	183
4	Sam Houston State	172 (1)
5	Central Arkansas	162 (1)
6	Northwestern State	156 (1)
7	Nicholls	131
8	Lamar	86
9	Abilene Christian	82
10	Houston Baptist	81
11	Texas A&M–Corpus Christi	47
12	Incarnate Word	32

=== Preseason All-Southland team ===
==== First Team ====
- Kaylyn Shephard (UCA, R-SR, 1st Base)
- Cayla Joens (NSU, JR, 2nd Base)
- Cylla Hall (UCA, R-SR, 3rd Base)
- Cori McCrary (MCNS, SR, Shortstop)
- Ella Manzer (SELA, SR, Catcher)
- Samantha Bradley (ACU, R-SR, Designated Player)
- Linsey Tomlinson (ACU, R-SR, Outfielder)
- Kaylee Lopez (MCNS, SO, Outfielder)
- Elise Vincent (NSU, SR, Outfielder)
- Madisen Blackford (SELA, SR, Outfielder)
- Megan McDonald (SHSU, SR, Outfielder)
- Kayla Beaver (UCA, R-FR, Pitcher)
- Kassidy Wilbur (SFA, JR, Pitcher)
- E. C. Delafield (NSU, JR, Utility)

==== Second Team ====
- Shaylon Govan (SFA, SO, 1st Base)
- Brooke Malia (SHSU, SR, 2nd Base)
- Bryana Novegil (SFA, SR, 2nd Base)
- Caitlin Garcia (NICH, JR, 3rd Base)
- Alex Hudspeth (SFA, JR, Shortstop)
- Alexis Perry (NSU, SO, Catcher)
- Bailey Richards (SFA, SR, Catcher)
- Caitlyn Brockway (HBU, SO, Designated Player)
- Reagan Sperling (UCA, R-JR, Outfielder)
- Alayis Seneca (MCNS, SO, Outfielder)
- Hayley Barbazon (NSU, SR, Outfielder)
- Saleen Flores (MCNS, SO, Pitcher)
- MC Comeaux (SELA, FR, Pitcher)
- Sammi Thomas (TAMUCC, SO, Utility)

== Roster ==
2021 Nicholls Colonels roster
Pitchers: 4 Alexis LaBure - Junior; 16 Taryn Westbrook - Freshman; 28 Emily Danehower - Sophomore; 33 Brittney Turner - Freshman; 37 Jordan Moon - Sophomore; Outfielders: 13 Corynn Major - Junior; 15 Shelby Devine - Freshman; 23 Kelsey Miller - Junior; 27 Bree Aguillard - Redshirt Freshman; 32 Kennedy Hebert - Sophomore; 42 Jaida Choice - Freshman	Catchers: 2 Catrin Hoffman - Freshman; 14 Lulu Vasquez - Freshman; 25 Yasmeen Williams - Junior; 36 Caitlin Garcia - Junior; Infielders: 5 Samantha Gwiazda - Freshman; 6 Emma Holland - Junior; 9 Alexa Poche' - Freshman; 12 Skylar Hamilton - Junior; 21 Sydnee Shelton - Freshman; 22 Ashlyn Reavis - Freshman; 34 Nikki Whitehead - Junior; Utility: 1 Danielle Duplay - Sophomore; 7 Kelsey Johnson - Freshman; 19 Scout Blades - Freshman; 20 Melise Gossen - Sophomore

=== Coaching staff ===
2021 Nicholls Colonels coaching staff
- Angel Santiago – Head Coach – 10th year
- Jessica Seamon – Assistant Head Coach – 5th year

== Schedule and results ==
Legend
	Nicholls win
	Nicholls loss
	Postponement/Cancellation
**Bold**	Nicholls team member

2021 Nicholls Colonels Softball Game Log
Regular season (12–28)

February (6–5)
Date	Opponent	Rank	Site/stadium	Score	Win	Loss	Save	TV	Attendance	Overall record	SLC Record
Lion Classic
Feb. 13	vs. SIU Edwardsville		North Oak Park • Hammond, LA	Game Canceled due to unsafe traveling conditions							
Feb. 13	vs. North Texas		North Oak Park • Hammond, LA	**W** 9-7	**Danehower** (1–0)	Wall (0–1)	None		119	1-0	
Feb. 13	vs. South Dakota		North Oak Park • Hammond, LA	**W** 17-1 (5 inns)	**Moon** (1–0)	Fletcher (0–3)	None		119	2-0	
Feb. 14	vs. SIU Edwardsville		North Oak Park • Hammond, LA	Game Canceled due to unsafe traveling conditions							
Feb. 14	vs. South Dakota		North Oak Park • Hammond, LA	**W** 6-4	**LaBure** (1–0)	Lisko (1–2)	None		65	3-0	
Feb. 14	vs. North Texas		North Oak Park • Hammond, LA	Game Canceled due to threat of freezing rain/sleet/snow in Hammond							
Feb. 19	Southern Miss		Swanner Field at Geo Surfaces Park • Thibodaux, LA	**W** 6-2	**LaBure** (2–0)	Pierce (1-1)	None		87	4-0	
Feb. 19	Southern Miss		Swanner Field at Geo Surfaces Park • Thibodaux, LA	**L** 0-3	Ladner (2–0)	**Danehower** (1-1)	None		87	4-1	
Feb. 20	Houston Baptist		Swanner Field at Geo Surfaces Park • Thibodaux, LA	**L** 4-9	Patak (1–0)	**Moon** (1-1)	None		101	4-2	
Feb. 20	Houston Baptist		Swanner Field at Geo Surfaces Park • Thibodaux, LA	**L** 3-5	Cotton (1–0)	**LaBure** (2–1)	None		96	4-3	
Feb. 25	at Alcorn State		Alcorn Softball Complex • Lorman, MS	Game Canceled							
UAB Softball Invitational
Feb. 26	vs. Alabama State		Mary Bowers Field • Birmingham, AL	**L** 1-8	Sullivan (2–3)	**LaBure** (2-2)	None		122	4-4	
Feb. 26	at UAB		Mary Bowers Field • Birmingham, AL	Game Canceled							
Feb. 27	vs. Alabama State		Mary Bowers Field • Birmingham, AL	**W** 8-0 (5 inns)	**Danehower** (2–1)	Myers (0–3)	None		130	5-4	
Feb. 27	at UAB		Mary Bowers Field • Birmingham, AL	**L** 1-7	Conrad (2–0)	**Moon** (1–2)	None		235	5-5	
Feb. 28	vs. Eastern Illinois		Mary Bowers Field • Birmingham, AL	**W** 4-0	**Danehower** (3–1)	Montgomery (3-3)	None		78	6-5	

March (2–8)
Date	Opponent	Rank	Site/stadium	Score	Win	Loss	Save	TV	Attendance	Overall record	SLC Record
Mar. 9	Southern		Swanner Field at Geo Surfaces Park • Thibodaux, LA	Game Postponed							
Mar. 12	Northwestern State		Swanner Field at Geo Surfaces Park • Thibodaux, LA	**L** 3-8	Rhoden (2-2)	**Danehower** (3–2)	None		123	6-6	0–1
Mar. 12	Northwestern State		Swanner Field at Geo Surfaces Park • Thibodaux, LA	**L** 1-10 (5 inns)	Howell (4–3)	**Moon** (1–3)	None		123	6-7	0–2
Mar. 13	Northwestern State		Swanner Field at Geo Surfaces Park • Thibodaux, LA	**L** 0-4	Delafield (2–1)	**LaBure** (2–3)	None		101	6-8	0–3
Mar. 19	at Stephen F. Austin		SFA Softball Field • Nacogdoches, TX	**L** 0-6	Wilbur (10–3)	**Danehower** (3-3)	None		236	6-9	0–4
Mar. 19	at Stephen F. Austin		SFA Softball Field • Nacogdoches, TX	**L** 2-12 (5 inns)	Chism (1–0)	**Turner** (0–1)	None		217	6-10	0–5
Mar. 20	at Stephen F. Austin		SFA Softball Field • Nacogdoches, TX	**L** 4-9	Wilbur (12–3)	**Moon** (1–4)	None		229	6-11	0–6
Mar. 26	Incarnate Word		Swanner Field at Geo Surfaces Park • Thibodaux, LA	**L** 2-3	Gunther (3–5)	**Danehower** (3–4)	None		101	6-12	0–7
Mar. 26	Incarnate Word		Swanner Field at Geo Surfaces Park • Thibodaux, LA	**L** 0-3	Trapp (2–3)	**Westbrook** (0–1)	None		101	6-13	0–8
Mar. 27	Incarnate Word		Swanner Field at Geo Surfaces Park • Thibodaux, LA	**W** 5-3	**Westbrook** (1-1)	Gunther (3–6)	None		88	7-13	1–8
Mar. 30	Southern		Swanner Field at Geo Surfaces Park • Thibodaux, LA	**W** 6-3	**Westbrook** (2–1)	Corona (0–2)	**Turner** (1)		101	8-13	

April (3–12)
Date	Opponent	Rank	Site/stadium	Score	Win	Loss	Save	TV	Attendance	Overall record	SLC Record
Apr. 2	Southeastern Louisiana		Swanner Field at Geo Surfaces Park • Thibodaux, LA	**L** 1-6	Zumo (11–2)	**Westbrook** (2-2)	None		244	8-14	1–9
Apr. 3	Southeastern Louisiana		Swanner Field at Geo Surfaces Park • Thibodaux, LA	**L** 3-5 (8 inns)	Comeaux (7–5)	**Westbrook** (2–3)	None		205	8-15	1–10
Apr. 3	Southeastern Louisiana		Swanner Field at Geo Surfaces Park • Thibodaux, LA	**L** 4-7	Zumo (12–2)	**Westbrook** (2–4)	None		200	8-16	1–11
Apr. 6	at South Alabama		Jaguar Field • Mobile, AL	**L** 2-10 (6 inns)	Hughen (5–4)	**Westbrook** (2–5)	None		200	8-17	
Apr. 10	at Central Arkansas		Farris Field • Conway, AR	**L** 2-14 (5 inns)	Johnson (8–4)	**Danehower** (3–5)	None		125	8-18	1–12
Apr. 10	at Central Arkansas		Farris Field • Conway, AR	**L** 0-2	Beaver (12–5)	**Moon** (1–5)	None		152	8-19	1–13
Apr. 11	at Central Arkansas		Farris Field • Conway, AR	**L** 1-7	Beaver (13–5)	**Westbrook** (2–6)	Johnson (2)		132	8-20	1–14
Apr. 16	at Texas A&M–Corpus Christi		Chapman Field • Corpus Christi, TX	**W** 4-2	**Moon** (2–5)	Lara (11–8)	**Danehower** (1)		178	9-20	2–14
Apr. 16	at Texas A&M–Corpus Christi		Chapman Field • Corpus Christi, TX	**L** 2-3	Lara (12–8)	**Westbrook** (2–7)	None		172	9-21	2–15
Apr. 17	at Texas A&M–Corpus Christi		Chapman Field • Corpus Christi, TX	**W** 8-2	**LaBure** (3-3)	Lara (12–9)	None		172	10-21	3–15
Apr. 23	Abilene Christian		Swanner Field at Geo Surfaces Park • Thibodaux, LA	**L** 2-3 (8 inns)	Bradley (4–13)	**LaBure** (3–4)	None		105	10-22	3–16
Apr. 23	Abilene Christian		Swanner Field at Geo Surfaces Park • Thibodaux, LA	**W** 3-1	**Westbrook** (3–7)	White (4–13)	None		137	11-22	4–16
Apr. 24	Abilene Christian		Swanner Field at Geo Surfaces Park • Thibodaux, LA	**L** 1-9 (5 inns)	Bradley (5–13)	**Westbrook** (3–8)	None		201	11-23	4–17
Apr. 30	at Lamar		Lamar Softball Complex • Beaumont, TX	**L** 3-4	Ruiz (2–8)	**LaBure** (3–5)	None		119	11-24	4–18
Apr. 30	at Lamar		Lamar Softball Complex • Beaumont, TX	**L** 1-3	Mixon (3–15)	**Westbrook** (3–9)	None		119	11-25	4–19

May (1–3)
Date	Opponent	Rank	Site/stadium	Score	Win	Loss	Save	TV	Attendance	Overall record	SLC Record
May 2	at Lamar		Lamar Softball Complex • Beaumont, TX	**L** 4-9	Ruiz (3–8)	**Turner** (0–2)	None		119	11-26	4-20
May 7	McNeese State		Swanner Field at Geo Surfaces Park • Thibodaux, LA	**L** 2-6	Tate (11–7)	**Westbrook** (3–10)	None		330	11-27	4-21
May 7	McNeese State		Swanner Field at Geo Surfaces Park • Thibodaux, LA	**W** 1-0	**LaBure** (4–5)	Edwards (7–2)	None		276	12-27	5-21
May 8	McNeese State		Swanner Field at Geo Surfaces Park • Thibodaux, LA	**L** 2-10 (6 inns)	Vallejo (7-7)	**Turner** (0–3)	None		202	12-28	5-22

Schedule source:

*Rankings are based on the team's current ranking in the NFCA/USA Softball poll.

== Postseason ==
=== Conference accolades ===
- Player of the Year: Kassidy Wilbur – SFA
- Hitter of the Year: Shaylon Govan – SFA
- Pitcher of the Year: Kassidy Wilbur – SFA
- Freshman of the Year: Jenna Wildeman – UCA
- Newcomer of the Year: Jenna Edwards – MCNS
- Coach of the Year: Nicole Dickson – SFA

All Conference First Team

- Shaylon Govan (SFA)
- Bryana Novegil (SFA)
- Haylee Brinlee (MCNS)
- Cori McCrary (MCNS)
- Heidi Jaquez (HBU)
- E. C. Delafield (NSU)
- Mackenzie Bennett (SFA)
- Jenna Wildeman (UCA)
- Megan McDonald (SHSU)
- Aeriyl Mass (SELA)
- Kayla Beaver (UCA)
- Kassidy Wilbur (SFA)

All Conference Second Team

- Kaylyn Shephard (UCA)
- Mary Kate Brown (UCA)
- Lindsey Rizzo (SELA)
- Camryn Middlebrook (SFA)
- Hannah Scheaffer (SHSU)
- Gaby Garcia (SFA)
- Kaylee Lopez (MCNS)
- Donelle Johnson (ACU)
- Jil Poullard (MCNS)
- Audrey Greely (SELA)
- Jordan Johnson (UCA)
- Whitney Tate (MCNS)

All Conference Third Team

- Caitlyn Brockway (HBU)
- Cayla Jones (NSU)
- Alex Hedspeth (SFA)
- Ashlyn Reavis (NICH)
- Chloe Gomez (MCNS)
- Jasie Roberts (HBU)
- Anna Rodenberg (SELA)
- Kaitlyn St. Clair (NSU)
- Sheridan Fisher (SHSU)
- Pal Egan (TAMUCC)
- Lyndie Swanson (HBU)
- Heather Zumo (SELA)
