= 2021 Abilene Christian Wildcats softball team =

Softball team

2021 Abilene Christian Wildcats softball
- Conference: Southland Conference
- Record: 14–33 (10–17 Southland)
- Head coach: Abigail Farler (2nd season)
- Assistant coaches: Jessica Twaddle; Caty Reeves
- Home stadium: Poly Wells Field

2021 Southland Conference softball standings
	Conf.				Overall
Team	W		L	PCT	W		L	PCT
Stephen F. Austin ‍†‍‍	25	–	2	.926	35	–	12	.745
Central Arkansas ‍‍‍	21	–	6	.778	37	–	19	.661
McNeese State ‍‍‡‍^{y}	18	–	9	.667	35	–	26	.574
Northwestern State ‍‍‍	16	–	11	.593	24	–	22	.522
Southeastern Louisiana ‍‍‍	14	–	10	.583	28	–	23	.549
Houston Baptist ‍‍‍	15	–	12	.556	22	–	17	.564
Sam Houston State ‍‍‍	14	–	13	.519	19	–	31	.380
Abilene Christian ‍‍‍	10	–	17	.370	14	–	33	.298
Incarnate Word ‍‍‍	9	–	18	.333	16	–	27	.372
Texas A&M–Corpus Christi ‍‍‍	8	–	16	.333	18	–	30	.375
Nicholls ‍‍‍	5	–	22	.185	12	–	28	.300
Lamar ‍‍‍	4	–	23	.148	8	–	43	.157
† – Conference champion ‡ – Tournament champion y – Invited to the NCAA tournament As of May 22, 2021; Rankings from NFCA

The 2021 Abilene Christian Wildcats softball team represented Abilene Christian University during the 2021 NCAA Division I softball season. The Wildcats played their home games at Poly Wells Field and were led by second-year head coach Abigail Farler. They were members of the Southland Conference.

== Preseason ==
=== Southland Conference Coaches Poll ===
The Southland Conference Coaches Poll was released on February 5, 2021. Abilene Christian was picked to finish ninth in the Southland Conference with 82 votes.

Coaches poll
Predicted finish	Team	Votes (1st place)
1	Stephen F. Austin	235 (17)
2	McNeese State	217 (4)
3	Southeastern Louisiana	183
4	Sam Houston State	172 (1)
5	Central Arkansas	162 (1)
6	Northwestern State	156 (1)
7	Nicholls	131
8	Lamar	86
9	Abilene Christian	82
10	Houston Baptist	81
11	Texas A&M–Corpus Christi	47
12	Incarnate Word	32

=== Preseason All-Southland team ===
==== First Team ====
- Kaylyn Shephard (UCA, R-SR, 1st Base)
- Cayla Joens (NSU, JR, 2nd Base)
- Cylla Hall (UCA, R-SR, 3rd Base)
- Cori McCrary (MCNS, SR, Shortstop)
- Ella Manzer (SELA, SR, Catcher)
- Samantha Bradley (ACU, R-SR, Designated Player)
- Linsey Tomlinson (ACU, R-SR, Outfielder)
- Kaylee Lopez (MCNS, SO, Outfielder)
- Elise Vincent (NSU, SR, Outfielder)
- Madisen Blackford (SELA, SR, Outfielder)
- Megan McDonald (SHSU, SR, Outfielder)
- Kayla Beaver (UCA, R-FR, Pitcher)
- Kassidy Wilbur (SFA, JR, Pitcher)
- E. C. Delafield (NSU, JR, Utility)

==== Second Team ====
- Shaylon Govan (SFA, SO, 1st Base)
- Brooke Malia (SHSU, SR, 2nd Base)
- Bryana Novegil (SFA, SR, 2nd Base)
- Caitlin Garcia (NICH, JR, 3rd Base)
- Alex Hudspeth (SFA, JR, Shortstop)
- Alexis Perry (NSU, SO, Catcher)
- Bailey Richards (SFA, SR, Catcher)
- Caitlyn Brockway (HBU, SO, Designated Player)
- Reagan Sperling (UCA, R-JR, Outfielder)
- Alayis Seneca (MCNS, SO, Outfielder)
- Hayley Barbazon (NSU, SR, Outfielder)
- Saleen Flores (MCNS, SO, Pitcher)
- MC Comeaux (SELA, FR, Pitcher)
- Sammi Thomas (TAMUCC, SO, Utility)

=== National Softball Signing Day ===
Player	Position	Hometown	Previous Team
Hannah Benavides	Pitcher	Deer Park, Texas	Deer Park HS
Alivia Benavidez	Outfielder	Salem, Oregon	South Salem HS
Mckenley Clark	Outfielder	Waco, Texas	Midway HS
Logan Gaspar	Shortstop	Kapolei, Hawaii	Maryknoll HS
Rose Gonzales	Shortstop	Grand Prairie, Texas	South Grand Prairie HS
Miranda Lista	Catcher/Utility	Chino Hills, California	Santa Margarita Catholic HS
Isabel Martinez	Outfielder	Dale, Texas	Cedar Creek HS
Mikhia Volley	Infielder	McDonough, Georgia	Ola HS

== Roster ==
2021 Abilene Christian Wildcats roster
Pitchers: 15 Riley White - Freshman; 28 Alivia Sinnott - Junior; 33 Samantha Bradley - Redshirt Senior; Outfielders: 1 Blakeli Brookreson - Senior; 4 Linsey Tomlinson - Redshirt Senior; 10 Caroline Adair - Redshirt Senior; 22 Maya Saneishi - Sophomore; Utility: 9 Donelle Johnson - Redshirt Senior; 77 Val Rudd - Sophomore	Catchers: 20 Kayla Keeling - Senior; 11 Sydney Kaiser - Freshman; 13 Avery Miloch - Freshman; 24 Braeland Booth - Junior; Infielders: 5 Shaylee Alani - Sophomore; 6 Moriah Ortiz - Redshirt Sophomore; 7 Briana Tijerina - Senior; 8 Katelyn Belch - Senior; 19 Calie Burris - Senior; 25 Miranda Davila - Freshman; 29 Paige Harris - Freshman

=== Coaching staff ===
2021 Abilene Christian Wildcats coaching staff
- Abigail Farler – Head Coach – 2nd year
- Jessica Twaddle – Assistant Head Coach – 3rd year
- Caty Reeves – Assistant Head Coach – 2nd year
- Sam Woodley – Graduate Assistant Coach – 1st year

== Schedule and results ==
Legend
	Abilene Christian win
	Abilene Christian loss
	Postponement/Cancellation
**Bold**	Abilene Christian team member

2021 Abilene Christian Wildcats softball game log
Regular season (14-32)

February (3-9)
Date	Opponent	Rank	Site/stadium	Score	Win	Loss	Save	TV	Attendance	Overall record	SLC Record
Miner Invitational
Feb. 11	at UTEP		Helen of Troy Softball Complex • El Paso, TX	**W** 13-6	**Bradley** (1-0)	Calderon (0-1)	None			1-0	
Feb. 11	vs. No. 4 Oklahoma		Helen of Troy Softball Complex • El Paso, TX	**L** 0-9 (5 inns)	May (1-0)	**White** (0-1)	None			1-1	
Feb. 12	vs. No. 4 Oklahoma		Helen of Troy Softball Complex • El Paso, TX	**L** 0-11 (6 inns)	Juarez (2-0)	**Sinnott** (0-1)	None			1-2	
Feb. 12	at UTEP		Helen of Troy Softball Complex • El Paso, TX	**W** 6-0	**White** (1-1)	Kelly (0-1)	None		65	2-2	
Maverick Classic
Feb. 21	vs. Texas State		Allan Saxe Field • Arlington, TX	Game Cancelled due to threat of freezing rain/sleet/snow in Arlington							
Feb. 21	at UT Arlington		Allan Saxe Field • Arlington, TX	Game Cancelled due to threat of freezing rain/sleet/snow in Arlington							
Feb. 22	vs. Texas State		Allan Saxe Field • Arlington, TX	Game Cancelled due to threat of freezing rain/sleet/snow in Arlington							
Feb. 22	vs. No. 20 Arkansas		Allan Saxe Field • Arlington, TX	Game Cancelled due to threat of freezing rain/sleet/snow in Arlington							
Feb. 22	at Texas State		Bobcat Softball Stadium • San Marcos, TX	**L** 0-6	Mullins (1-0)	**White** (1-2)	None	ESPN+	201	2-3	
Feb. 22	at Texas State		Bobcat Softball Stadium • San Marcos, TX	**L** 2-6	King (1-0)	**Bradley** (1-1)	None	ESPN+	201	2-4	
Feb. 23	at North Texas		Lovelace Stadium • Denton, TX	**L** 2-10 (5 inns)	Worthington (1-0)	**Bradley** (1-2)	None	CUSA.TV	91	2-5	
Feb. 26	at Houston		Cougar Softball Stadium • Houston, TX	**L** 5-6	Hertenberger (2-1)	**White** (1-3)	None	ESPN+	64	2-6	
Feb. 27	at Texas Southern		Memorial Park • Houston, TX	**L** 5-6	Reyes (1-2)	**Bradley** (1-3)	None		83	2-7	
Feb. 27	at Texas Southern		Memorial Park • Houston, TX	**W** 8-3	**White** (2-3)	Gendorf (0-2)	None		90	3-7	
Feb. 28	at Houston		Cougar Softball Stadium • Houston, TX	**L** 8-10	Lee (2-1)	**Bradley** (1-3)	None			3-8	
Feb. 28	at Houston		Cougar Softball Stadium • Houston, TX	**L** 5-13 (5 inns)	Hudson (3-1)	**White** (2-4)	None			3-9	

March (4-12)
Date	Opponent	Rank	Site/stadium	Score	Win	Loss	Save	TV	Attendance	Overall record	SLC Record
Mar. 3	Tarleton State		Poly Wells Field • Abilene, TX	**W** 6-4	**White** (3-4)	Erwin (0-3)	None		246	4-9	
Texas Tech Invitational
Mar. 6	vs. Kansas City		Rocky Johnson Field • Lubbock, TX	**L** 3-6	Hoveland (5-1)	**Bradley** (1-5)	None		250	4-10	
Mar. 6	at Texas Tech		Rocky Johnson Field • Lubbock, TX	**L** 0-1	Zoch (4-2)	**White** (3-5)	None	ESPN+	250	4-11	
Mar. 7	vs. Kansas City		Rocky Johnson Field • Lubbock, TX	**L** 3-4	Stickel (5-0)	**White** (3-6)	None		250	4-12	
Mar. 7	at Texas Tech		Rocky Johnson Field • Lubbock, TX	**L** 2-7	Edmoundson (4-4)	**Bradley** (1-6)	None	ESPN+	250	4-13	
Mar. 12	at Houston Baptist		Husky Field • Houston, TX	**W** 4-2	**Bradley** (2-6)	Patak (3-2)	None		80	5-13	1-0
Mar. 12	at Houston Baptist		Husky Field • Houston, TX	**L** 6-10	Swanson (1-0)	**Harris** (0-1)	None		60	5-14	1-1
Mar. 13	at Houston Baptist		Husky Field • Houston, TX	**W** 4-0	**Bradley** (3-6)	Patak (3-3)	None		45	6-14	2-1
Mar. 17	at Tarleton State		Tarleton Softball Complex • Stephenville, TX	**L** 0-1	Bridges (3-7)	**Bradley** (3-7)	None		352	6-15	
Mar. 19	Central Arkansas		Poly Wells Field • Abilene, TX	**L** 0-7	Beaver (7-3)	**Bradley** (3-8)	None		250	6-16	2-2
Mar. 19	Central Arkansas		Poly Wells Field • Abilene, TX	**L** 0-8 (6 inns)	Johnson (4-4)	**White** (3-7)	None		250	6-17	2-3
Mar. 20	Central Arkansas		Poly Wells Field • Abilene, TX	**L** 2-15 (5 inns)	Beaver (8-3)	**Bradley** (3-9)	None		250	6-18	2-4
Mar. 26	at Southeastern Louisiana		North Oak Park • Hammond, LA	**L** 2-6	Hannabas (1-3)	**Bradley** (3-10)	None	ESPN+	245	6-19	2-5
Mar. 26	at Southeastern Louisiana		North Oak Park • Hammond, LA	**W** 5-4	**White** (4-7)	DuBois (0-2)	None	ESPN+	245	7-19	3-5
Mar. 27	at Southeastern Louisiana		North Oak Park • Hammond, LA	**L** 0-5	Zumo (10-2)	**Bradley** (3-11)	None	ESPN+	233	7-20	3-6
Mar. 30	North Texas		Poly Wells Field • Abilene, TX	**L** 2-11	Wall (7-4)	**White** (4-8)	None		212	7-21	

April (3–11)
Date	Opponent	Rank	Site/stadium	Score	Win	Loss	Save	TV	Attendance	Overall record	SLC Record
Apr. 2	Stephen F. Austin		Poly Wells Field • Abilene, TX	**L** 1-9 (6 inns)	Wilbur (15-3)	**Bradley** (3-12)	None		142	7-22	3-7
Apr. 2	Stephen F. Austin		Poly Wells Field • Abilene, TX	**L** 5-10	Wilbur (16-3)	**White** (4-9)	None		142	7-23	3-8
Apr. 3	Stephen F. Austin		Poly Wells Field • Abilene, TX	**L** 0-8 (5 inns)	Wilbur (17-3)	**Sinnott** (0-2)	None		163	7-24	3-9
Apr. 6	at Baylor		Getterman Stadium • Waco, TX	Game Postponed							
Apr. 6	at Baylor		Getterman Stadium • Waco, TX	Game Postponed							
Apr. 9	Sam Houston State		Poly Wells Field • Abilene, TX	**L** 10-13	Vento (4-4)	**Bradley** (3-13)	None		117	7-25	3-10
Apr. 9	Sam Houston State		Poly Wells Field • Abilene, TX	**L** 3-9	Bachmeyer (2-5)	**White** (4-10)	None		117	7-26	3-11
Apr. 10	Sam Houston State		Poly Wells Field • Abilene, TX	**L** 5-9	Vento (5-5)	**Harris** (0-2)	None		94	7-27	3-12
Apr. 16	at McNeese State		Joe Miller Field at Cowgirl Diamond • Lake Charles, LA	**L** 0-7	Tate (7-7)	**White** (4-11)	None		256	7-28	3-13
Apr. 16	at McNeese State		Joe Miller Field at Cowgirl Diamond • Lake Charles, LA	**L** 1-7	Edwards (6-1)	**White**(4-12)	None		256	7-29	3-14
Apr. 17	at McNeese State		Joe Miller Field at Cowgirl Diamond • Lake Charles, LA	**L** 0-8 (6 inns)	Vallejo (3-5)	**Harris** (0-3)	None		297	7-30	3-15
Apr. 23	at Nicholls		Swanner Field at Geo Surfaces Park • Thibodaux, LA	**W** 3-2	**Bradley** (4-13)	LaBure (3-4)	None		105	8-30	4-15
Apr. 23	at Nicholls		Swanner Field at Geo Surfaces Park • Thibodaux, LA	**L** 1-3	Westbrook (3-7)	**White** (4-13)	None		137	8-31	4-16
Apr. 24	at Nicholls		Swanner Field at Geo Surfaces Park • Thibodaux, LA	**W** 9-1	**Bradley** (5-13)	Westbrook (3-8)	None		201	9-31	5-16
Apr. 30	Incarnate Word		Poly Wells Field • Abilene, TX	**W** 3-0	**Bradley** (6-13)	Gunther (7-9)	None		136	10-31	6-16
Apr. 30	Incarnate Word		Poly Wells Field • Abilene, TX	**L** 2-4	Trapp (6-6)	**White** (4-14)	None		202	10-32	6-16

May (4-0)
Date	Opponent	Rank	Site/stadium	Score	Win	Loss	Save	TV	Attendance	Overall record	SLC Record
May 1	Incarnate Word		Poly Wells Field • Abilene, TX	**W** 9-0 (5 inns)	**Bradley** (7-13)	Trapp (6-7)	None		174	11-32	7-16
May 7	Texas A&M–Corpus Christi		Poly Wells Field • Abilene, TX	**W** 7-5	**Bradley** (8-13)	Lara (13-11)	None		248	12-32	8-16
May 7	Texas A&M–Corpus Christi		Poly Wells Field • Abilene, TX	**W** 5-3	**Bradley** (9-13)	McNeill (1-8)	None		248	13-32	9-16
May 8	Texas A&M–Corpus Christi		Poly Wells Field • Abilene, TX	**W** 10-9	**Bradley** (10-13)	Johnson (0-1)	None		361	14-32	10-16

Post-Season (0-1)

Southland Tournament (0-1)
Date	Opponent	(Seed)/Rank	Site/stadium	Score	Win	Loss	Save	TV	Attendance	Overall record	Tournament record
May 12	vs. (5) Southeastern Louisiana	(8)	North Oak Park • Hammond, LA	**L** 3-4	Zumo (16-6)	**Bradley** (10-14)	None	ESPN+	222	14-33	0-1

Schedule source:

*Rankings are based on the team's current ranking in the NFCA/USA Softball poll.

== Postseason ==
=== Conference accolades ===
- Player of the Year: Kassidy Wilbur – SFA
- Hitter of the Year: Shaylon Govan – SFA
- Pitcher of the Year: Kassidy Wilbur – SFA
- Freshman of the Year: Jenna Wildeman – UCA
- Newcomer of the Year: Jenna Edwards – MCNS
- Coach of the Year: Nicole Dickson – SFA

All Conference First Team

- Shaylon Govan (SFA)
- Bryana Novegil (SFA)
- Haylee Brinlee (MCNS)
- Cori McCrary (MCNS)
- Heidi Jaquez (HBU)
- E. C. Delafield (NSU)
- Mackenzie Bennett (SFA)
- Jenna Wildeman (UCA)
- Megan McDonald (SHSU)
- Aeriyl Mass (SELA)
- Kayla Beaver (UCA)
- Kassidy Wilbur (SFA)

All Conference Second Team

- Kaylyn Shephard (UCA)
- Mary Kate Brown (UCA)
- Lindsey Rizzo (SELA)
- Camryn Middlebrook (SFA)
- Hannah Scheaffer (SHSU)
- Gaby Garcia (SFA)
- Kaylee Lopez (MCNS)
- Donelle Johnson (ACU)
- Jil Poullard (MCNS)
- Audrey Greely (SELA)
- Jordan Johnson (UCA)
- Whitney Tate (MCNS)

All Conference Third Team

- Caitlyn Brockway (HBU)
- Cayla Jones (NSU)
- Alex Hedspeth (SFA)
- Ashlyn Reavis (NICH)
- Chloe Gomez (MCNS)
- Jasie Roberts (HBU)
- Anna Rodenberg (SELA)
- Kaitlyn St. Clair (NSU)
- Sheridan Fisher (SHSU)
- Pal Egan (TAMUCC)
- Lyndie Swanson (HBU)
- Heather Zumo (SELA)
