= Mary D. Lowman =

American politician

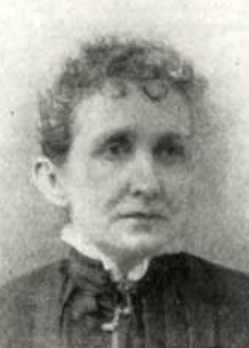
- Mary D. Lowman, ca. 1893

Mayor of Oskaloosa, Kansas
- In office 1888–1890

Personal details
- Born: Mary D. McGaha; January 27, 1842 Indiana County, Pennsylvania
- Died: June 2, 1912 (aged 70) Oskaloosa, Kansas
- Spouse: George W. Lowman
- Occupation: Schoolteacher

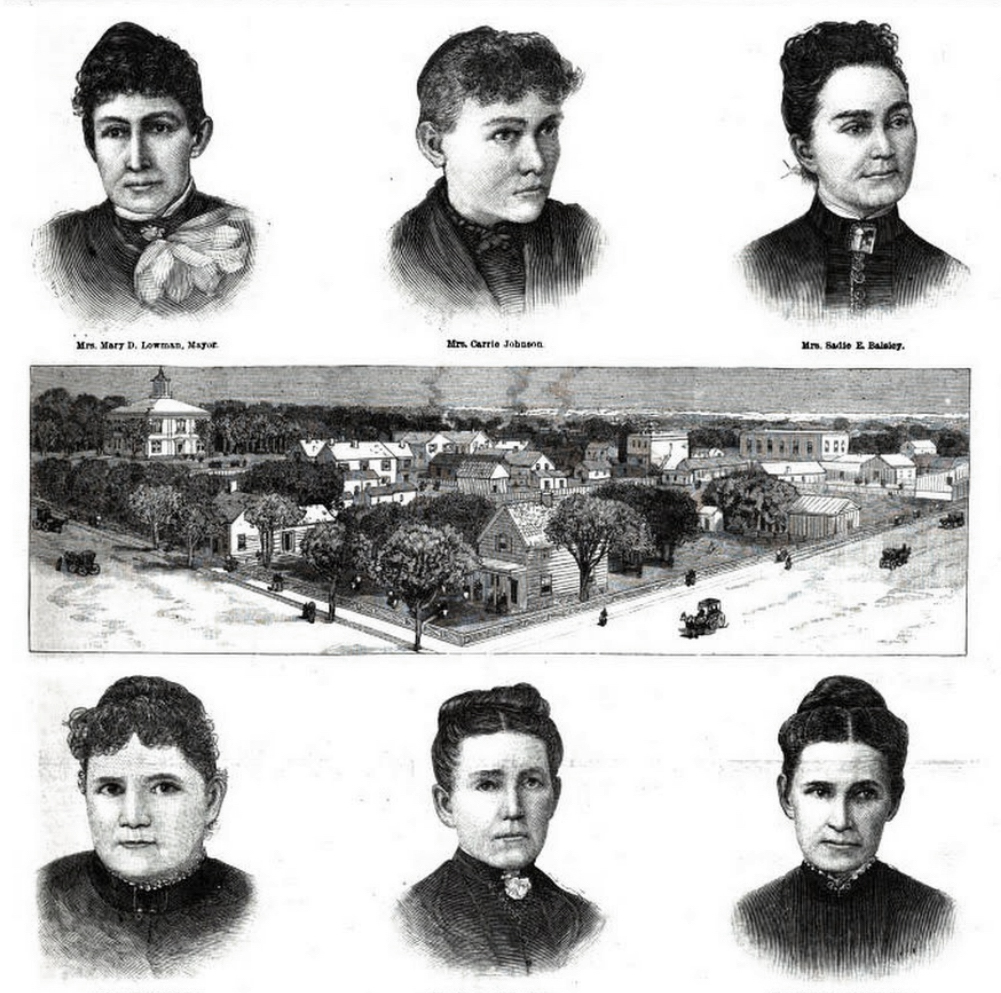
Engraving of the all-women city administration of Oskaloosa, Kansas, 1888, with a view of the city. Clockwise from upper left: Mayor Mary D. Lawson and Councilwomen Carrie Johnson, Sadie E. Balsley, Mittie Josephine Golden, Emma K. Hamilton, and Hanna P. Morse.

Mary D. (McGaha) Lowman (January 27, 1842 – June 12, 1912) was a schoolteacher and the mayor of Oskaloosa, Kansas, in the late 1880s. She was the first woman in Kansas to be elected mayor with a city council composed entirely of women.

== Biography ==
Mary D. McGaha was born on a farm in Indiana County, Pennsylvania. She became a schoolteacher and in 1866 married a man named George W. Lowman, with whom she had two children. They moved to Kansas and settle in the small town of Oskaloosa, where she became a teacher of recently emancipated black students.

In 1885, she became the city's deputy county clerk and deputy register of deeds. In 1888, the women of Oskaloosa, dissatisfied with poor city management, decided to run an entire slate of women for municipal office. (Although American women did not yet have a national right to vote, Kansas women had been given the right to vote in some municipal elections one year earlier.) The "Oskaloosa Improvement Ticket" won by a two-to-one margin, making Lowman the first woman in Kansas to serve as mayor with a city council composed entirely of women. Newspapers across the country covered the unusual election of an all-women municipal administration. Lowman was elected only a year after Susanna M. Salter of Argonia, Kansas became the nation's first woman mayor.

When Lowman and her council took office, the city treasury was empty and the city in debt. Lowman and her 5-member council were re-elected after their first year in office, with two members of the council being replaced by other women. After two years in office, Lowman and her council left the city with a replenished treasury.

Lowman died in 1912 of burns received when her clothing caught fire at a cookstove.
