= 2021 Incarnate Word Cardinals softball team =

American college softball season

2021 Incarnate Word Cardinals softball
- Conference: Southland Conference
- Record: 16–27 (9–18 Southland)
- Head coach: Joe DiPietro (4th season)
- Assistant coaches: Tammie Davis; Angel Villanueva
- Home stadium: H-E-B Field

2021 Southland Conference softball standings
	Conf.				Overall
Team	W		L	PCT	W		L	PCT
Stephen F. Austin ‍†‍‍	25	–	2	.926	35	–	12	.745
Central Arkansas ‍‍‍	21	–	6	.778	37	–	19	.661
McNeese State ‍‍‡‍^{y}	18	–	9	.667	35	–	26	.574
Northwestern State ‍‍‍	16	–	11	.593	24	–	22	.522
Southeastern Louisiana ‍‍‍	14	–	10	.583	28	–	23	.549
Houston Baptist ‍‍‍	15	–	12	.556	22	–	17	.564
Sam Houston State ‍‍‍	14	–	13	.519	19	–	31	.380
Abilene Christian ‍‍‍	10	–	17	.370	14	–	33	.298
Incarnate Word ‍‍‍	9	–	18	.333	16	–	27	.372
Texas A&M–Corpus Christi ‍‍‍	8	–	16	.333	18	–	30	.375
Nicholls ‍‍‍	5	–	22	.185	12	–	28	.300
Lamar ‍‍‍	4	–	23	.148	8	–	43	.157
† – Conference champion ‡ – Tournament champion y – Invited to the NCAA tournament As of May 22, 2021; Rankings from NFCA

The 2021 Incarnate Word Cardinals softball team represented the University of the Incarnate Word during the 2021 NCAA Division I softball season. The Cardinals played their home games at H-E-B Field and were led by fourth-year head coach Joe DiPietro. They were members of the Southland Conference.

== Preseason ==
=== Southland Conference Coaches Poll ===
The Southland Conference Coaches Poll was released on February 5, 2021. Incarnate Word was picked to finish dead last in the Southland Conference at twelfth with 32 votes.

Coaches poll
Predicted finish	Team	Votes (1st place)
1	Stephen F. Austin	235 (17)
2	McNeese State	217 (4)
3	Southeastern Louisiana	183
4	Sam Houston State	172 (1)
5	Central Arkansas	162 (1)
6	Northwestern State	156 (1)
7	Nicholls	131
8	Lamar	86
9	Abilene Christian	82
10	Houston Baptist	81
11	Texas A&M–Corpus Christi	47
12	Incarnate Word	32

=== Preseason All-Southland team ===
No players from Incarnate Word were chosen to the All-Southland team

=== National Softball Signing Day ===
Player	Position	Hometown	Previous Team
Chase Cotter	Outfielder/3rd Base	Austin, Texas	Akins HS
Madi Mitchell	Outfielder/2nd Base	Waller, Texas	Waller HS
Lauren Olivarri	Infielder	San Antonio, Texas	Business Careers HS

== Roster ==
2021 Incarnate Word Cardinals roster
Pitchers: 10 Madison Floyd - Sophomore; 12 Ashley Trapp - Junior; 13 Annie Gunther - Sophomore; 14 Brett Coleman - Senior; 28 Maddy Blake - Freshman; 31 Natalie Myers - Sophomore; 48 Renee Hoffman - Junior; 76 Catarina Esteves - Freshman; 99 Hannah Chapa - Freshman; Outfielders: 1 Jordan Goins - Senior; 8 Julia Cordon - Sophomore; 24 Teanna Lucio - Senior; 25 Savannah BeHabetz - Sophomore; 34 Kendall McGary - Sophomore; 44 Maddie Boldt - Sophomore	Catchers: 5 Bela Sanchez - Sophomore; 26 Avalon Sanchez - Freshman; 45 Hailey Jackson - Redshirt Sophomore; Infielders: 2 Maddison Guillen - Freshman; 4 Hailey Goins - Senior; 11 Tori Alvarez-Lopez - Senior; 15 Jazmine Torres - Sophomore; 16 Hannah Zajdel - Redshirt Sophomore; 27 Leah Hayes - Freshman; Utility: 22 Abby Frank - Sophomore; 32 Delaney Guzman - Senior

=== Coaching staff ===
2021 Incarnate Word Cardinals coaching staff
- Joe DiPietro – Head Coach – 4th year
- Tammie Davis – Assistant Head Coach – 2nd year
- Angel Villanueva – Assistant Head Coach – 2nd year
- Corina Thornton – Graduate Manager

== Schedule and results ==
Legend
	Incarnate Word win
	Incarnate Word loss
	Postponement/Cancellation
**Bold**	Incarnate Word team member

2021 Incarnate Word Cardinals Softball Game Log
Regular season (16-27)

February (0-4)
Date	Opponent	Rank	Site/stadium	Score	Win	Loss	Save	TV	Attendance	Overall record	SLC Record
Feb. 12	Prairie View A&M		H-E-B Field • San Antonio, TX	Game Cancelled due to threat of freezing rain/sleet/snow in San Antonio							
Feb. 12	Prairie View A&M		H-E-B Field • San Antonio, TX	Game Cancelled due to threat of freezing rain/sleet/snow in San Antonio							
Feb. 13	Prairie View A&M		H-E-B Field • San Antonio, TX	Game Cancelled due to threat of freezing rain/sleet/snow in San Antonio							
Feb. 13	Prairie View A&M		H-E-B Field • San Antonio, TX	Game Cancelled due to threat of freezing rain/sleet/snow in San Antonio							
Feb. 19	Texas Southern		H-E-B Field • San Antonio, TX	Game Cancelled due to threat of freezing rain/sleet/snow in San Antonio							
Feb. 20	Texas Southern		H-E-B Field • San Antonio, TX	Game Cancelled due to threat of freezing rain/sleet/snow in San Antonio							
Feb. 20	Texas Southern		H-E-B Field • San Antonio, TX	Game Cancelled due to threat of freezing rain/sleet/snow in San Antonio							
North Texas Invitational
Feb. 26	vs. Tarleton State		Lovelace Stadium • Denton, TX	**L** 1-5	Wernet (2-2)	**Gunther** (0-1)	None		50	0-1	
Feb. 26	at North Texas		Lovelace Stadium • Denton, TX	**L** 0-9 (5 inns)	Wall (2-2)	**Trapp** (0-1)	None		75	0-2	
Feb. 27	at North Texas		Lovelace Stadium • Denton, TX	**L** 0-5	Worthington (2-0)	**Myers** (0-1)	None		75	0-3	
Feb. 27	vs. Tarelton State		Lovelace Stadium • Denton, TX	**L** 2-9	Wernet (4-2)	**Floyd** (0-1)	None		50	0-4	

March (6-11)
Date	Opponent	Rank	Site/stadium	Score	Win	Loss	Save	TV	Attendance	Overall record	SLC Record
Mar. 2	UHV		H-E-B Field • San Antonio, TX	**W** 8-0 (6 inns)	**Gunther** (1-1)	Kristoff (0-1)	None		75	1-4	
Mar. 2	UHV		H-E-B Field • San Antonio, TX	**W** 6-5	**Floyd** (1-1)	Kristoff (0-5)	None		75	2-4	
Orange and Blue Classic
Mar. 5	vs. No. 11 Arizona State		Helen of Troy Softball Complex • El Paso, TX	**L** 0-14 (6 inns)	Royalty (4-1)	**Myers** (0-2)	None		40	2-5	
Mar. 5	at UTEP		Helen of Troy Softball Complex • El Paso, TX	**L** 2-4	Kelly (1-1)	**Gunther** (1-2)	Collins (1)		78	2-6	
Mar. 6	vs. Montana		Helen of Troy Softball Complex • El Paso, TX	**L** 4-5	Achenbach (4-4)	**Gunther** (1-3)	None		29	2-7	
Mar. 6	vs. No. 11 Arizona State		Helen of Troy Softball Complex • El Paso, TX	**L** 0-8 (5 inns)	Lopez (5-0)	**Floyd** (1-2)	None		90	2-8	
Mar. 12	Stephen F. Austin		H-E-B Field • San Antonio, TX	**L** 1-11 (5 inns)	Wilbur (8-3)	**Floyd** (1-3)	None		75	2-9	0-1
Mar. 12	Stephen F. Austin		H-E-B Field • San Antonio, TX	**L** 0-8	Wilbur (9-3)	**Myers** (0-3)	None		75	2-10	0-2
Mar. 13	Stephen F. Austin		H-E-B Field • San Antonio, TX	**L** 2-8	Wilbur (10-3)	**Trapp** (0-2)	None		75	2-11	0-3
Mar. 19	Northwestern State		H-E-B Field • San Antonio, TX	**L** 2-5	Rhoden (3-2)	'**Gunther** (1-4)	None		75	2-12	0-4
Mar. 19	Northwestern State		H-E-B Field • San Antonio, TX	**L** 0-17 (5 inns)	Delafield (3-1)	**Trapp** (0-3)	None		75	2-13	0-5
Mar. 20	Northwestern State		H-E-B Field • San Antonio, TX	**L** 0-5	Delafield (4-1)	**Gunther** (1-5)	None		75	2-14	0-6
Mar. 23	Tarleton State		H-E-B Field • San Antonio, TX	**W** 1-0	**Gunther** (2-5)	Wernet (6-7)	None		20	3-14	
Mar. 23	Tarleton State		H-E-B Field • San Antonio, TX	**W** 6-0	**Trapp** (1-3)	Bridges (5-9)	None		20	4-14	
Mar. 26	at Nicholls		Swanner Field at Geo Surfaces Park • Thibodaux, LA	**W** 3-2	**Gunther** (3-5)	Danehower (3-4)	None		101	5-14	1-6
Mar. 26	at Nicholls		Swanner Field at Geo Surfaces Park • Thibodaux, LA	**W** 3-0	**Trapp** (2-3)	Westbrook (0-1)	None		101	6-14	2-6
Mar. 27	at Nicholls		Swanner Field at Geo Surfaces Park • Thibodaux, LA	**L** 3-5	Westbrook (1-1)	**Gunther** (3-6)	None		88	6-15	2-7

April (10-8)
Date	Opponent	Rank	Site/stadium	Score	Win	Loss	Save	TV	Attendance	Overall record	SLC Record
Apr. 1	Texas A&M–Corpus Christi		H-E-B Field • San Antonio, TX	**W** 5-4	**Trapp** (3-3)	McNeill (1-3)	None		75	7-15	3-7
Apr. 1	Texas A&M–Corpus Christi		H-E-B Field • San Antonio, TX	**W** 6-3	**Gunther** (4-6)	Depew (0-2)	None		75	8-15	4-7
Apr. 2	Texas A&M–Corpus Christi		H-E-B Field • San Antonio, TX	**L** 0-1	Lara (10-5)	**Trapp** (3-4)	None		75	8-16	4-8
Apr. 7	Texas A&M–San Antonio		H-E-B Field • San Antonio, TX	**W** 7-0	**Floyd** (2-3)	Rodriguez (3-5)	None		75	9-16	
Apr. 7	Texas A&M–San Antonio		H-E-B Field • San Antonio, TX	**W** 7-3	**Myers** (1-3)	Lizama (1-3)	None		75	10-16	
Apr. 9	at Houston Baptist		Husky Field • Houston, TX	**L** 4-6	Patak (5-7)	**Trap** (3-5)	None		40	10-17	4-9
Apr. 9	at Houston Baptist		Husky Field • Houston, TX	**L** 1-5	Swanson (4-0)	**Gunther** (4-7)	None		30	10-18	4-10
Apr. 10	at Houston Baptist		Husky Field • Houston, TX	**L** 2-7	Swanson (5-0)	**Floyd** (2-4)	None		45	10-19	4-11
Apr. 13	at Texas Southern		Memorial Park • Houston, TX	Game Cancelled							
Apr. 13	at Texas Southern		Memorial Park • Houston, TX	Game Cancelled							
Apr. 17	at Lamar		Lamar Softball Complex • Beaumont, TX	**W** 9-1 (6 inns)	**Gunther** (5-7)	Mixon (2-12)	None		119	11-19	5-11
Apr. 18	at Lamar		Lamar Softball Complex • Beaumont, TX	**W** 7-5	**Trapp** (4-5)	Ruiz (1-7)	**Floyd** (1)		119	12-19	6-11
Apr. 18	at Lamar		Lamar Softball Complex • Beaumont, TX	**W** 5-1	**Gunther** (6-7)	Mixon (2-13)	None		119	13-19	7-11
Apr. 20	at Prairie View A&M		Lady Panther Softball Stadium • Prairie View, TX	**W** 6-0	**Trapp** (5-5)	Hall (4-5)	None		42	14-19	
Apr. 20	at Prairie View A&M		Lady Panther Softball Stadium • Prairie View, TX	**L** 2-3	Johnson (2-0)	**Myers** (1-4)	None		42	14-20	
Apr. 23	McNeese State		H-E-B Field • San Antonio, TX	**L** 6-14	Vallejo (6-6)	**Gunther** (6-8)	None		75	14-21	7-12
Apr. 24	McNeese State		H-E-B Field • San Antonio, TX	**L** 1-3	Tate (8-7)	**Trapp** (5-6)	None		75	14-22	7-13
Apr. 24	McNeese State		H-E-B Field • San Antonio, TX	**W** 3-2	**Gunther** (7-8)	Vallejo (6-7)	None		75	15-22	8-13
Apr. 30	at Abilene Christian		Poly Wells Field • Abilene, TX	**L** 0-3	Bradley (6-13)	**Gunther** (7-9)	None		136	15-23	8-14
Apr. 30	at Abilene Christian		Poly Wells Field • Abilene, TX	**W** 4-2	**Trapp** (6-6)	White (4-14)	None		202	16-23	9-14

May (0-4)
Date	Opponent	Rank	Site/stadium	Score	Win	Loss	Save	TV	Attendance	Overall record	SLC Record
May 1	at Abilene Christian		Poly Wells Field • Abilene, TX	**L** 0-9 (5 inns)	Bradley (7-13)	**Trapp** (6-7)	None		174	16-24	9-15
May 7	at Sam Houston State		Bearkat Softball Complex • Huntsville, TX	**L** 0-4	Dunn (7-11)	**Trapp** (6-8)	None		116	16-25	9-16
May 7	at Sam Houston State		Bearkat Softball Complex • Huntsville, TX	**L** 0-4	Bachmeyer (2-5)	**Gunther** (7-10)	None		116	16-26	9-17
May 8	at Sam Houston State		Bearkat Softball Complex • Huntsville, TX	**L** 1-9	Vento (8-7)	**Trapp** (6-9)	None		135	16-27	9-18

Schedule source:

*Rankings are based on the team's current ranking in the NFCA/USA Softball poll.
