= 2021 Texas A&M–Corpus Christi Islanders softball team =

American college softball season

2021 Texas A&M–Corpus Christi Islanders softball
- Conference: Southland Conference
- Record: 18–30 (8–16 Southland)
- Head coach: Kristen Zaleski (2nd season)
- Assistant coaches: Paige Williams; Andrew Zeger
- Home stadium: Chapman Field

2021 Southland Conference softball standings
	Conf.				Overall
Team	W		L	PCT	W		L	PCT
Stephen F. Austin ‍†‍‍	25	–	2	.926	35	–	12	.745
Central Arkansas ‍‍‍	21	–	6	.778	37	–	19	.661
McNeese State ‍‍‡‍^{y}	18	–	9	.667	35	–	26	.574
Northwestern State ‍‍‍	16	–	11	.593	24	–	22	.522
Southeastern Louisiana ‍‍‍	14	–	10	.583	28	–	23	.549
Houston Baptist ‍‍‍	15	–	12	.556	22	–	17	.564
Sam Houston State ‍‍‍	14	–	13	.519	19	–	31	.380
Abilene Christian ‍‍‍	10	–	17	.370	14	–	33	.298
Incarnate Word ‍‍‍	9	–	18	.333	16	–	27	.372
Texas A&M–Corpus Christi ‍‍‍	8	–	16	.333	18	–	30	.375
Nicholls ‍‍‍	5	–	22	.185	12	–	28	.300
Lamar ‍‍‍	4	–	23	.148	8	–	43	.157
† – Conference champion ‡ – Tournament champion y – Invited to the NCAA tournament As of May 22, 2021; Rankings from NFCA

The 2021 Texas A&M–Corpus Christi Islanders softball team represented Texas A&M University–Corpus Christi during the 2021 NCAA Division I softball season. The Islanders played their home games at the softball facility at Chapman Field and were led by second-year head coach Kristen Zaleski. They were members of the Southland Conference.

== Preseason ==
=== Southland Conference Coaches Poll ===
The Southland Conference Coaches Poll was released on February 5, 2021. Texas A&M–Corpus Christi was picked to finish eleventh in the Southland Conference with 47 votes.

Coaches poll
Predicted finish	Team	Votes (1st place)
1	Stephen F. Austin	235 (17)
2	McNeese State	217 (4)
3	Southeastern Louisiana	183
4	Sam Houston State	172 (1)
5	Central Arkansas	162 (1)
6	Northwestern State	156 (1)
7	Nicholls	131
8	Lamar	86
9	Abilene Christian	82
10	Houston Baptist	81
11	Texas A&M–Corpus Christi	47
12	Incarnate Word	32

=== Preseason All-Southland team ===
==== First Team ====
- Kaylyn Shephard (UCA, R-SR, 1st Base)
- Cayla Joens (NSU, JR, 2nd Base)
- Cylla Hall (UCA, R-SR, 3rd Base)
- Cori McCrary (MCNS, SR, Shortstop)
- Ella Manzer (SELA, SR, Catcher)
- Samantha Bradley (ACU, R-SR, Designated Player)
- Linsey Tomlinson (ACU, R-SR, Outfielder)
- Kaylee Lopez (MCNS, SO, Outfielder)
- Elise Vincent (NSU, SR, Outfielder)
- Madisen Blackford (SELA, SR, Outfielder)
- Megan McDonald (SHSU, SR, Outfielder)
- Kayla Beaver (UCA, R-FR, Pitcher)
- Kassidy Wilbur (SFA, JR, Pitcher)
- E. C. Delafield (NSU, JR, Utility)

==== Second Team ====
- Shaylon Govan (SFA, SO, 1st Base)
- Brooke Malia (SHSU, SR, 2nd Base)
- Bryana Novegil (SFA, SR, 2nd Base)
- Caitlin Garcia (NICH, JR, 3rd Base)
- Alex Hudspeth (SFA, JR, Shortstop)
- Alexis Perry (NSU, SO, Catcher)
- Bailey Richards (SFA, SR, Catcher)
- Caitlyn Brockway (HBU, SO, Designated Player)
- Reagan Sperling (UCA, R-JR, Outfielder)
- Alayis Seneca (MCNS, SO, Outfielder)
- Hayley Barbazon (NSU, SR, Outfielder)
- Saleen Flores (MCNS, SO, Pitcher)
- MC Comeaux (SELA, FR, Pitcher)
- Sammi Thomas (TAMUCC, SO, Utility)

== Roster ==
2021 Texas A&M Corpus Christi Islanders roster
Pitchers: 9 Sydney Hoyt - Freshman; 13 Audrey McNeill - Freshman; 20 Beatriz Lara - Sophomore'; 21 Megan Depew - Freshman; 73 Jenika Lombrana - Sophomore; Outfielders: 3 Kennedy Jimenez - Junior; 4 Madison Johnson - Freshman; 11 Alexandria Torres - Freshman; 24 Katrina Jackson - Redshirt Sophomore; 26 Tiler Noyola - Junior; 49 Alie Alcantar - Freshman; Utilities: 6 Daisy Gonzalez - Junior; 22 Skye Koehl - Senior; 33 Sammi Thomas - Sophomore	Catchers: 15 Haley Morse - Freshman; 17 Kayla Keith - Freshman; 19 Kaylee Hoppens - Redshirt Sophomore; Infielders: 1 Gabriella Torres - Freshman; 2 Tiare Lee - Junior; 5 Alyssa Escamilla - Sophomore; 7 Mackenzie Purcell - Sophomore; 10 Ashleigh Sgambelluri - Sophomore; 12 Bailey Payne - Freshman; 16 Narianna Hernandez - Freshman; 18 Kayla Gonzalez - Freshman; 27 Quinn de Avila - Sophomore; 55 Pal Egan - Sophomore

=== Coaching staff ===
2021 Texas A&M–Corpus Christi Islanders coaching staff
- Kristen Zaleski – Head Coach – 2nd year
- Paige Williams – Assistant Head Coach – 2nd year
- Andrew Zeger – Assistant Head Coach – 1st year

== Schedule and results ==
Legend
	Texas A&M–Corpus Christi win
	Texas A&M–Corpus Christi loss
	Postponement/Cancellation
**Bold**	Texas A&M–Corpus Christi team member

2021 Texas A&M–Corpus Christi Islanders Softball Game Log
Regular season (18-30)

February (6-4)
Date	Opponent	Rank	Site/stadium	Score	Win	Loss	Save	TV	Attendance	Overall record	SLC Record
Aggie Classic
Feb. 12	at Texas A&M		Davis Diamond • College Station, TX	Game cancelled due to threat of freezing rain/sleet/snow in College Station							
Feb. 13	at Texas A&M		Davis Diamond • College Station, TX	Game cancelled due to threat of freezing rain/sleet/snow in College Station							
Feb. 13	vs. Utah Valley		Davis Diamond • College Station, TX	Game cancelled due to threat of freezing rain/sleet/snow in College Station							
Feb. 14	at Texas A&M		Davis Diamond • College Station, TX	Game cancelled due to threat of freezing rain/sleet/snow in College Station							
Scrap Yard Blizzard Challenge
Feb. 20	vs. No. 11 Oklahoma State		Scrap Yard Sports Complex • Conroe, TX	**L** 1-11 (5 inns)	Simunek (1-0)	**Lombrana** (0-1)	None		67	0-1	
Feb. 20	vs. Tarleton State		Scrap Yard Softball Complex • Conroe, TX	**W** 13-3 (5 inns)	**Lara** (1-0)	Bridges (0-1)	None		67	1-1	
Feb. 21	vs. Wichita State		Scrap Yard Softball Complex • Conroe, TX	**W** 5-1	**Lombrana** (1-1)	Martinez (0-1)	None		702	2-1	
Feb. 21	vs. No. 11 Oklahoma State		Scrap Yard Softball Complex • Conroe, TX	**L** 0-11 (6 inns)	Maxwell (3-0)	**Lara** (1-1)	None		702	2-2	
Feb. 24	Texas Southern		Chapman Field • Corpus Christi, TX	**W** 5-3	**Lombrana** (2-1)	Reyes (0-2)	**McNeill** (1)		87	3-2	
Feb. 24	Texas Southern		Chapman Field • Corpus Christi, TX	**W** 7-1	**Lara** (2-1)	Gendorf (0-1)	None		114	4-2	
UTSA Classic
Feb. 26	vs. UT Arlington		Roadrunner Field • San Antonio, TX	**L** 7-9	Bumpurs (1-2)	**Lombrana** (2-2)	Hines (1)		50	4-3	
Feb. 27	vs. UT Arlington		Roadrunner Field • San Antonio, TX	**W** 12-8	**McNeill** (1-0)	Hines (0-3)	None		50	5-3	
Feb. 27	vs. Kansas		Roadrunner Field • San Antonio, TX	**L** 5-9	Hamilton (1-1)	**Lombrana** (0-2)	Todd (1)		50	5-4	
Feb. 28	at UTSA		Roadrunner Field • San Antonio, TX	**W** 2-1	**Lara** (3-1)	Williams (0-1)	None			6-4	

March (8-12)
Date	Opponent	Rank	Site/stadium	Score	Win	Loss	Save	TV	Attendance	Overall record	SLC Record
Boerner Invitational
Mar. 4	vs. North Texas		Allan Saxe Field • Arlington, TX	**L** 0-5	Wall (0-1)	**Lombrana** (2-4)	None		156	6-5	
Mar. 4	at UT Arlington		Allan Saxe Field • Arlington, TX	**W** 5-4	**Lara** (4-1)	Valencia (1-4)	**Lombrana** (1)		156	7-5	
Mar. 5	vs. Wichita State		Allan Saxe Field • Arlington, TX	**L** 4-5	Bingham (1-0)	**Hoyt** (0-1)	Lange (1)		156	7-6	
Mar. 5	vs. Missouri State		Allan Saxe Field • Arlington, TX	**L** 0-11 (5 inns)	Johnston (2-0)	**Lombrana** (2-5)	None		156	7-7	
Mar. 6	vs. No. 23 Iowa State		Allan Saxe Field • Arlington, TX	**L** 3-6	Mortimer (3-0)	**McNeill** (1-1)	None		156	7-8	
Mar. 10	at No. 10 Texas		Red and Charline McCombs Field • Austin, TX	**L** 6-10	Day (1-0)	**McNeill** (1-2)	Adams (1)	LHN	310	7-9	
Mar. 12	Sam Houston State		Chapman Field • Corpus Christi, TX	**W** 4-2	**Lara** (5-1)	Vento (2-2)	None		134	8-9	1-0
Mar. 12	Sam Houston State		Chapman Field • Corpus Christi, TX	**L** 0-6	Dunn (2-3)	**Lombrana** (2-6)	None		224	8-10	1-1
Mar. 13	Sam Houston State		Chapman Field • Corpus Christi, TX	**W** 5-0	**Lara** (6-1)	Billmeier (0-3)	None		204	9-10	2-1
Mar. 16	at Texas State		Bobcat Softball Complex • San Marcos, TX	**L** 0-2	Mullins (7-2)	**Lara** (6-2)	None		174	9-11	
Mar. 19	at Lamar		Lamar Softball Complex • Beaumont, TX	**W** 6-0	**Lara** (7-2)	Mixon (1-5)	None		119	10-11	3-1
Mar. 19	at Lamar		Lamar Softball Complex • Beaumont, TX	**W** 11-0 (5 inns)	**Lombrana** (3-6)	Reyna (0-6)	None		119	11-11	4-1
Mar. 20	at Lamar		Lamar Softball Complex • Beaumont, TX	**W** 6-0	**Lara** (8-2)	Reyna (0-7)	None		119	12-11	5-1
Mar. 24	Tarleton State		Chapman Field • Corpus Christi, TX	**W** 4-0	**Lara** (9-2)	Wernet (6-8)	None		137	13-11	
Mar. 24	Tarleton State		Chapman Field • Corpus Christi, TX	**W** 5-0	**Lombranma** (4-6)	Bridges (5-10)	None		137	14-11	
Mar. 26	McNeese State		Chapman Field • Corpus Christi, TX	**L** 2-3 (9 inns)	Edwards (3-1)	**Lara** (9-3)	None		141	14-12	5-2
Mar. 26	McNeese State		Chapman Field • Corpus Christi, TX	**L** 1-6	Tate (5-7)	**Lombrana** (4-7)	None		141	14-13	5-3
Mar. 27	McNeese State		Chapman Field • Corpus Christi, TX	**L** 0-9	Edwards (4-1)	**Lara** (9-4)	None		151	14-14	5-4
Mar. 30	at RV Texas A&M		Davis Diamond • College Station, TX	**L** 0-7	Poynter (7-1)	**Lara** (9-5)	None	SECN+	156	14-15	
Mar. 30	at RV Texas A&M		Davis Diamond • College Station, TX	**L** 2-9	Uribe (6-1)	**Depew** (0-1)	None	SECN+	227	14-16	

April (4–8)
Date	Opponent	Rank	Site/stadium	Score	Win	Loss	Save	TV	Attendance	Overall record	SLC Record
Apr. 1	at Incarnate Word		H-E-B Field • San Antonio, TX	**L** 4-5	Trapp (3-3)	**McNeill** (1-3)	None		75	14-17	5-5
Apr. 1	at Incarnate Word		H-E-B Field • San Antonio, TX	**L** 3-6	Gunther (4-6)	**Hoyt** (0-2)	None		75	14-18	5-6
Apr. 2	at Incarnate Word		H-E-B Field • San Antonio, TX	**W** 1-0	**Lara** (10-5)	Trapp (3-4)	None		75	15-18	6-6
Apr. 6	at Prairie View A&M		Lady Panthers Softball Field • Prairie View, TX	**L** 3-5	Tapia (1-0)	**McNeill** (1-4)	None		87	15-19	
Apr. 9	Stephen F. Austin		Chapman Field • Corpus Christi, TX	**L** 0-2	Wilbur (18-3)	**Lara** (10-6)	None		137	15-20	6-7
Apr. 9	Stephen F. Austin		Chapman Field • Corpus Christi, TX	**L** 1-6	Wilbur (19-3)	**McNeill** (1-5)	None		137	15-21	6-8
Apr. 10	Stephen F. Austin		Chapman Field • Corpus Christi, TX	**L** 2-7	Wilbur (20-3)	**Lara** (10-7)	None		153	15-22	6-9
Apr. 14	UTSA		Chapman Field • Corpus Christi, TX	**W** 8-0 (5 inns)	**Lara** (11-7)	Carpenter (0-3)	None		106	16-22	
Apr. 16	Nicholls		Chapman Field • Corpus Christi, TX	**L** 2-4	Moon (2-5)	**Lara** (11-8)	Danehower (1)		178	16-23	6-10
Apr. 16	Nicholls		Chapman Field • Corpus Christi, TX	**W** 3-2	**Lara** (12-8)	Westbrook (2-7)	None		172	17-23	7-10
Apr. 17	Nicholls		Chapman Field • Corpus Christi, TX	**L** 2-8	LaBure (3-3)	**Lara** (12-9)	None		172	17-24	7-11
Apr. 24	at Southeastern Louisiana		North Oak Park • Hammond, LA	Game cancelled							
Apr. 24	at Southeastern Louisiana		North Oak Park • Hammond, LA	Game cancelled							
Apr. 25	at Southeastern Louisiana		North Oak Park • Hammond, LA	Game cancelled							
Apr. 28	at Texas Southern		Memorial Park • Houston, TX	**L** 5-6 (9 inns)	Youngblood (1-0)	**McNeill** (1-6)	None		50	17-25	
Apr. 30	Houston Baptist		Chapman Field • Corpus Christi, TX	**W** 4-3 (8 inns)	**Lara** (13-9)	Swanson (8-1)	None		109	18-25	8-11

May (0-5)
Date	Opponent	Rank	Site/stadium	Score	Win	Loss	Save	TV	Attendance	Overall record	SLC Record
May 2	Houston Baptist		Chapman Field • Corpus Christi, TX	**L** 1-2	Swanson (9-1)	**Lara** (13-10)	None		155	18-26	8-12
May 2	Houston Baptist		Chapman Field • Corpus Christi, TX	**L** 0-2	Patak (7-9)	**McNeill** (1-7)	None		155	18-27	8-13
May 7	at Abilene Christian		Poly Wells Field • Abilene, TX	**L** 5-7	Bradley (8-13)	**Lara** (13-11)	None		248	18-28	8-14
May 7	at Abilene Christian		Poly Wells Field • Abilene, TX	**L** 3-5	Bradley (9-13)	**McNeill** (1-8)	None		248	18-29	8-15
May 8	at Abilene Christian		Poly Wells Field • Abilene, TX	**L** 9-10	Bradley (10-13)	**Johnson** (0-1)	None		361	18-30	8-16

Schedule source:*Rankings are based on the team's current ranking in the NFCA/USA Softball poll.

== Postseason ==
=== Conference accolades ===
- Player of the Year: Kassidy Wilbur – SFA
- Hitter of the Year: Shaylon Govan – SFA
- Pitcher of the Year: Kassidy Wilbur – SFA
- Freshman of the Year: Jenna Wildeman – UCA
- Newcomer of the Year: Jenna Edwards – MCNS
- Coach of the Year: Nicole Dickson – SFA

All Conference First Team

- Shaylon Govan (SFA)
- Bryana Novegil (SFA)
- Haylee Brinlee (MCNS)
- Cori McCrary (MCNS)
- Heidi Jaquez (HBU)
- E. C. Delafield (NSU)
- Mackenzie Bennett (SFA)
- Jenna Wildeman (UCA)
- Megan McDonald (SHSU)
- Aeriyl Mass (SELA)
- Kayla Beaver (UCA)
- Kassidy Wilbur (SFA)

All Conference Second Team

- Kaylyn Shephard (UCA)
- Mary Kate Brown (UCA)
- Lindsey Rizzo (SELA)
- Camryn Middlebrook (SFA)
- Hannah Scheaffer (SHSU)
- Gaby Garcia (SFA)
- Kaylee Lopez (MCNS)
- Donelle Johnson (ACU)
- Jil Poullard (MCNS)
- Audrey Greely (SELA)
- Jordan Johnson (UCA)
- Whitney Tate (MCNS)

All Conference Third Team

- Caitlyn Brockway (HBU)
- Cayla Jones (NSU)
- Alex Hedspeth (SFA)
- Ashlyn Reavis (NICH)
- Chloe Gomez (MCNS)
- Jasie Roberts (HBU)
- Anna Rodenberg (SELA)
- Kaitlyn St. Clair (NSU)
- Sheridan Fisher (SHSU)
- Pal Egan (TAMUCC)
- Lyndie Swanson (HBU)
- Heather Zumo (SELA)
