= 2021 Houston Baptist Huskies softball team =

American college softball season

2021 Houston Baptist Huskies softball
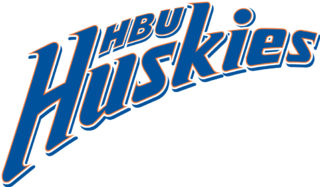
- Conference: Southland Conference
- Record: 22–17 (15–12 Southland)
- Head coach: Mary-Ellen Hall (30th season)
- Assistant coaches: Roger Willhite; Natali Duron
- Home stadium: Husky Field

2021 Southland Conference softball standings
	Conf.				Overall
Team	W		L	PCT	W		L	PCT
Stephen F. Austin ‍†‍‍	25	–	2	.926	35	–	12	.745
Central Arkansas ‍‍‍	21	–	6	.778	37	–	19	.661
McNeese State ‍‍‡‍^{y}	18	–	9	.667	35	–	26	.574
Northwestern State ‍‍‍	16	–	11	.593	24	–	22	.522
Southeastern Louisiana ‍‍‍	14	–	10	.583	28	–	23	.549
Houston Baptist ‍‍‍	15	–	12	.556	22	–	17	.564
Sam Houston State ‍‍‍	14	–	13	.519	19	–	31	.380
Abilene Christian ‍‍‍	10	–	17	.370	14	–	33	.298
Incarnate Word ‍‍‍	9	–	18	.333	16	–	27	.372
Texas A&M–Corpus Christi ‍‍‍	8	–	16	.333	18	–	30	.375
Nicholls ‍‍‍	5	–	22	.185	12	–	28	.300
Lamar ‍‍‍	4	–	23	.148	8	–	43	.157
† – Conference champion ‡ – Tournament champion y – Invited to the NCAA tournament As of May 22, 2021; Rankings from NFCA

The 2021 Houston Baptist Huskies softball team represented Houston Baptist University during the 2021 NCAA Division I softball season. The Huskies played their home games at Husky Field and were led by thirtieth year head coach Mary-Ellen Hall. They were members of the Southland Conference.

== Preseason ==
=== Southland Conference Coaches Poll ===
The Southland Conference Coaches Poll was released on February 5, 2021. Houston Baptist was picked to finish tenth in the Southland Conference with 81 votes.

Coaches poll
Predicted finish	Team	Votes (1st place)
1	Stephen F. Austin	235 (17)
2	McNeese State	217 (4)
3	Southeastern Louisiana	183
4	Sam Houston State	172 (1)
5	Central Arkansas	162 (1)
6	Northwestern State	156 (1)
7	Nicholls	131
8	Lamar	86
9	Abilene Christian	82
10	Houston Baptist	81
11	Texas A&M–Corpus Christi	47
12	Incarnate Word	32

=== Preseason All-Southland team ===
==== First Team ====
- Kaylyn Shephard (UCA, R-SR, 1st Base)
- Cayla Joens (NSU, JR, 2nd Base)
- Cylla Hall (UCA, R-SR, 3rd Base)
- Cori McCrary (MCNS, SR, Shortstop)
- Ella Manzer (SELA, SR, Catcher)
- Samantha Bradley (ACU, R-SR, Designated Player)
- Linsey Tomlinson (ACU, R-SR, Outfielder)
- Kaylee Lopez (MCNS, SO, Outfielder)
- Elise Vincent (NSU, SR, Outfielder)
- Madisen Blackford (SELA, SR, Outfielder)
- Megan McDonald (SHSU, SR, Outfielder)
- Kayla Beaver (UCA, R-FR, Pitcher)
- Kassidy Wilbur (SFA, JR, Pitcher)
- E. C. Delafield (NSU, JR, Utility)

==== Second Team ====
- Shaylon Govan (SFA, SO, 1st Base)
- Brooke Malia (SHSU, SR, 2nd Base)
- Bryana Novegil (SFA, SR, 2nd Base)
- Caitlin Garcia (NICH, JR, 3rd Base)
- Alex Hudspeth (SFA, JR, Shortstop)
- Alexis Perry (NSU, SO, Catcher)
- Bailey Richards (SFA, SR, Catcher)
- Caitlyn Brockway (HBU, SO, Designated Player)
- Reagan Sperling (UCA, R-JR, Outfielder)
- Alayis Seneca (MCNS, SO, Outfielder)
- Hayley Barbazon (NSU, SR, Outfielder)
- Saleen Flores (MCNS, SO, Pitcher)
- MC Comeaux (SELA, FR, Pitcher)
- Sammi Thomas (TAMUCC, SO, Utility)

=== National Softball Signing Day ===
Player	Position	Hometown	Previous Team
Abriana Garcia	Utility	Houston, Texas	Cypress Lake HS
Breana Herrera	Infielder	Corpus Christi, Texas	Mary Carroll HS
Haylie Savage	Utility	Angleton, Texas	Angleton HS

== Roster ==
2021 Houston Baptist Huskies roster
Pitchers: 7 Madison Cotton - Redshirt Freshman; 9 Elliott Estes - Junior; 21 Sarah Venker - Sophomore; 22 Jessica Patak - Junior; 33 Lyndie Swanson - Redshirt Freshman; Outfielders: 5 Riley Bullen - Senior; 26 Riley Martin - Freshman; 32 Sierra Humphrey - Junior	Catchers: 1 Jasie Roberts - Redshirt Freshman; 15 Heidi Jaquez - Senior; 23 Caitlyn Brockway - Sophomore; Infielders: 2 Baylee Chandler - Freshman; 3 Kaicey Hagler - Freshman; 8 Shelby Echols - Redshirt Freshman; 11 Autumn Sydlik - Sophomore; Utility: 4 Avery Drake - Redshirt Freshman; 14 Kamryn Parker - Senior; 20 Katy Janes - Freshman; 27 Jackie Jessup - Freshman

=== Coaching staff ===
2021 Houston Baptist Huskies coaching staff
- Mary-Ellen Hall – Head Coach – 29th year
- Roger Willhite – Assistant Head Coach – 21st year
- Natali Duron – Assistant Head Coach – 2nd year
- Shae Bibby – Volunteer Assistant Coach

== Schedule and results ==
Legend
	Houston Baptist win
	Houston Baptist loss
	Postponement/Cancellation
**Bold**	Houston Baptist team member

2021 Houston Baptist Huskies softball game log
Regular season (22-16)

February (5-1)
Date	Opponent	Rank	Site/stadium	Score	Win	Loss	Save	TV	Attendance	Overall record	SLC Record
Black & Gold Invitational
Feb. 12	vs. North Dakota		Southern Miss Softball Complex • Hattiesburg, MS	Game Cancelled due to threat of freezing rain/sleet/snow in Hattiesburg							
Feb. 13	at Southern Miss		Southern Miss Softball Complex • Hattiesburg, MS	Game Cancelled due to threat of freezing rain/sleet/snow in Hattiesburg							
Feb. 13	vs. SIU Edwardsville		Southern Miss Softball Complex • Hattiesburg, MS	Game Cancelled due to threat of freezing rain/sleet/snow in Hattiesburg							
Feb. 13	vs. SIU Edwardsville		Southern Miss Softball Complex • Hattiesburg, MS	Game Cancelled due to threat of freezing rain/sleet/snow in Hattiesburg							
Feb. 20	at Nicholls		Swanner Field at Geo Surfaces Park • Thibodaux, LA	**W** 9-4	**Patak** (1-0)	Moon (1-1)	None		101	1-0	
Feb. 20	at Nicholls		Swanner Field at Geo Surfaces Park• Thibodaux, LA	**W** 5-3	**Cotton** (1-0)	LaBure (2-1)	None		96	2-0	
Feb. 26	UHV		Husky Field • Houston, TX	**W** 5-0	**Cotton** (2-0)	Kristoff (0-1)	None		103	3-0	
Feb. 26	UHV		Husky Field • Houston, TX	**W** 5-0	**Patak** (2-0)	Cowan (0-1)	None		98	4-0	
Feb. 28	at Southern Miss		Southern Miss Softball Complex • Hattiesburg, MS	**W** 2-0	**Venker** (1-0)	Leinstock (3-1)	None			5-0	
Feb. 28	at Southern Miss		Southern Miss Softball Complex • Hattiesburg, MS	**L** 2-3	Pierce (2-1)	**Patak** (1-1)	None			5-1	

March (4-8)
Date	Opponent	Rank	Site/stadium	Score	Win	Loss	Save	TV	Attendance	Overall record	SLC Record
Mar. 6	Prairie View A&M		Husky Field • Houston, TX	**W** 12-1 (5 inns)	**Patak** (3-1)	Hall (0-1)	None		120	6-1	
Mar. 6	Prairie View A&M		Husky Field • Houston, TX	**W** 11-0 (5 inns)	**Venker** (2-0)	Fucci (0-1)	None		110	7-1	
Mar. 12	Abilene Christian		Husky Field • Houston, TX	**L** 2-4	Bradley (2-6)	**Patak** (2-3)	None		80	7-2	0-1
Mar. 12	Abilene Christian		Husky Field • Houston, TX	**W** 10-6	**Swanson** (1-0)	Harris (0-1)	None		60	8-2	1-1
Mar. 13	Abilene Christian		Husky Field • Houston, TX	**L** 0-4	Bradley (3-6)	**Patak** (3-3)	None		45	8-3	1-2
Mar. 16	at Texas A&M		Davis Diamond • College Station, TX	**L** 0-6	Poynter (5-0)	**Patak** (3-4)	None		315	8-4	
Mar. 19	Southeastern Louisiana		Husky Field • Houston, TX	**L** 1-2	Zumo (8-2)	**Patak** (3-5)	DuBois (2)		95	8-5	1-3
Mar. 19	Southeastern Louisiana		Husky Field • Houston, TX	**W** 6-5	**Swanson** (2-0)	Hannabas (0-3)	None		90	9-5	2-3
Mar. 20	Southeastern Louisiana		Husky Field • Houston, TX	**L** 4-9	Zumo (9-2)	**Janes** (0-1)	None		55	9-6	2-4
Mar. 26	at Northwestern State		Lady Demon Diamond • Natchitoches, LA	**L** 1-2	Howell (5-3)	**Patak** (3-6)	None		300	9-7	2-5
Mar. 26	at Northwestern State		Lady Demon Diamond • Natchitoches, LA	**L** 1-5	Delafield (5-1)	**Venker** (2-1)	None		300	9-8	2-6
Mar. 27	at Northwestern State		Lady Demon Diamond • Natchitoches, LA	**L** 2-7	Rhoden (4-2)	**Patak** (3-7)	None		200	9-9	2-7

April (10-5)
Date	Opponent	Rank	Site/stadium	Score	Win	Loss	Save	TV	Attendance	Overall record	SLC Record
Apr. 2	at Sam Houston State		Bearkat Softball Complex • Huntsville, TX	**W** 8-0 (6 inns)	**Patak** (4-7)	Dunn (4-5)	None		109	10-9	3-7
Apr. 2	at Sam Houston State		Bearkat Softball Complex • Huntsville, TX	**W** 2-0	**Swanson** (3-0)	Vento (3-5)	None		109	11-9	4-7
Apr. 3	at Sam Houston State		Bearkat Softball Complex • Huntsville, TX	**L** 1-4	Bachmeyer (1-1)	**Janes** (0-2)	Vento (1)		111	11-10	4-8
Apr. 9	Incarnate Word		Husky Field • Houston, TX	**W** 6-4	**Patak** (5-7)	Trapp (3-5)	None		40	12-10	5-8
Apr. 9	Incarnate Word		Husky Field • Houston, TX	**W** 5-1	**Swanson** (4-0)	Gunther (4-7)	None		30	13-10	6-8
Apr. 10	Incarnate Word		Husky Field • Houston, TX	**W** 7-2	**Swanson** (5-0)	Floyd (2-4)	None		45	14-10	7-8
Apr. 13	at Prairie View A&M		Lady Panther Softball Field • Prairie View, TX	**L** 4-7	Fucci (1-0)	**Estes** (0-1)	Hall (2)		28	14-11	
Apr. 17	Central Arkansas		Husky Field • Houston, TX	**L** 2-5	Johnson (9-4)	**Patak** (5-8)	None		50	14-12	7-9
Apr. 17	Central Arkansas		Husky Field • Houston, TX	**W** 1-0	**Swanson** (6-0)	Beaver (13-6)	None		50	15-12	8-9
Apr. 18	Central Arkansas		Husky Field • Houston, TX	**W** 2-1	**Patak** (5-8)	Johnson (9-4)	None			16-12	9-9
Apr. 24	Lamar		Husky Field • Houston, TX	**W** 9-2	**Patak** (6-8)	Mixon (1-10)	None		57	17-12	10-9
Apr. 24	Lamar		Husky Field • Houston, TX	**W** 2-1	**Swanson** (8-0)	Ruiz (0-3)	None		150	18-12	11-9
Apr. 25	Lamar		Husky Field • Houston, TX	**W** 7-0	**Venker** (3-1)	Mixon (2-14)	None		115	19-12	12-9
Apr. 28	at RV Texas State		Bobcat Softball Stadium • San Marcos, TX	**L** 2-4	Mullins (16-6)	**Patak** (6-9)	None		234	19-13	
Apr. 30	at Texas A&M–Corpus Christi		Chapman Field • Corpus Christi, TX	**L** 3-4	Lara (13-9)	**Swanson** (8-1)	None		109	19-14	12-10

May (3-2)
Date	Opponent	Rank	Site/stadium	Score	Win	Loss	Save	TV	Attendance	Overall record	SLC Record
May 2	at Texas A&M–Corpus Christi		Chapman Field • Corpus Christi, TX	**W** 2-1	**Swanson** (9-1)	Lara (13-10)	None		155	20-14	13-10
May 2	at Texas A&M–Corpus Christi		Chapman Field • Corpus Christi, TX	**W** 2-0	**Patak** (7-9)	McNeill (1-7)	None		155	21-14	14-10
May 7	at Stephen F. Austin		SFA Softball Field • Nacogdoches, TX	**W** 3-1	**Patak** (8-9)	Wilbur (28-4)	None		143	22-14	15-10
May 7	at Stephen F. Austin		SFA Softball Field • Nacogdoches, TX	**L** 4-5	Chism (3-1)	**Swanson** (9-2)	Wilbur (3)		116	22-15	15-11
May 8	at Stephen F. Austin		SFA Softball Field • Nacogdoches, TX	**L** 0-1	Wilbur (29-4)	**Patak** (8-10)	None		135	22-16	15-12

Post-Season (0-1)

Southland Tournament (0-1)
Date	Opponent	(Seed)/Rank	Site/stadium	Score	Win	Loss	Save	TV	Attendance	Overall record	Tournament record
May 12	(7) Sam Houston State	(6)	North Oak Park • Hammond, LA	**L** 3-4	Dunn (8-11)	**Swanson** (9-3)	None	ESPN+	172	22-17	0-1

Schedule source:*Rankings are based on the team's current ranking in the NFCA/USA Softball poll.

== Postseason ==
=== Conference accolades ===
- Player of the Year: Kassidy Wilbur – SFA
- Hitter of the Year: Shaylon Govan – SFA
- Pitcher of the Year: Kassidy Wilbur – SFA
- Freshman of the Year: Jenna Wildeman – UCA
- Newcomer of the Year: Jenna Edwards – MCNS
- Coach of the Year: Nicole Dickson – SFA

All Conference First Team

- Shaylon Govan (SFA)
- Bryana Novegil (SFA)
- Haylee Brinlee (MCNS)
- Cori McCrary (MCNS)
- Heidi Jaquez (HBU)
- E. C. Delafield (NSU)
- Mackenzie Bennett (SFA)
- Jenna Wildeman (UCA)
- Megan McDonald (SHSU)
- Aeriyl Mass (SELA)
- Kayla Beaver (UCA)
- Kassidy Wilbur (SFA)

All Conference Second Team

- Kaylyn Shephard (UCA)
- Mary Kate Brown (UCA)
- Lindsey Rizzo (SELA)
- Camryn Middlebrook (SFA)
- Hannah Scheaffer (SHSU)
- Gaby Garcia (SFA)
- Kaylee Lopez (MCNS)
- Donelle Johnson (ACU)
- Jil Poullard (MCNS)
- Audrey Greely (SELA)
- Jordan Johnson (UCA)
- Whitney Tate (MCNS)

All Conference Third Team

- Caitlyn Brockway (HBU)
- Cayla Jones (NSU)
- Alex Hedspeth (SFA)
- Ashlyn Reavis (NICH)
- Chloe Gomez (MCNS)
- Jasie Roberts (HBU)
- Anna Rodenberg (SELA)
- Kaitlyn St. Clair (NSU)
- Sheridan Fisher (SHSU)
- Pal Egan (TAMUCC)
- Lyndie Swanson (HBU)
- Heather Zumo (SELA)
