= 2021 Southland Conference softball tournament =

2021 Southland Conference: Hammond, USA

- Teams: 7
- Format: Double-elimination tournament
- Finals site: North Oak Park; Hammond, Louisiana
- Champions: McNeese (7th title)
- Winning coach: James Landreneau (3rd title)
- MVP: Whitney Tate (McNeese)
- Television: ESPN+

2021 Southland Conference softball standings
	Conf.				Overall
Team	W		L	PCT	W		L	PCT
Stephen F. Austin ‍†‍‍	25	–	2	.926	35	–	12	.745
Central Arkansas ‍‍‍	21	–	6	.778	37	–	19	.661
McNeese State ‍‍‡‍^{y}	18	–	9	.667	35	–	26	.574
Northwestern State ‍‍‍	16	–	11	.593	24	–	22	.522
Southeastern Louisiana ‍‍‍	14	–	10	.583	28	–	23	.549
Houston Baptist ‍‍‍	15	–	12	.556	22	–	17	.564
Sam Houston State ‍‍‍	14	–	13	.519	19	–	31	.380
Abilene Christian ‍‍‍	10	–	17	.370	14	–	33	.298
Incarnate Word ‍‍‍	9	–	18	.333	16	–	27	.372
Texas A&M–Corpus Christi ‍‍‍	8	–	16	.333	18	–	30	.375
Nicholls ‍‍‍	5	–	22	.185	12	–	28	.300
Lamar ‍‍‍	4	–	23	.148	8	–	43	.157
† – Conference champion ‡ – Tournament champion y – Invited to the NCAA tournament As of May 22, 2021; Rankings from NFCA

The 2021 Southland Conference tournament was held at North Oak Park in Hammond, Louisiana, from May 11 through 14, 2021. The tournament winner, McNeese, earned the Southland Conference's automatic bid to the 2021 NCAA Division I softball tournament. All games were broadcast on ESPN+.

== Format ==
The tournament was a 7 team double elimination format. The top seeded team, McNeese, received a bye in first round competition.

== Seeds ==
Teams were seeded by record within the conference, with a tie–breaker system to seed teams with identical conference records. All seven teams in the conference qualified for the tournament. Tie–breaker procedures were not required.

Seed	School	Conference
1	Stephen F. Austin	25–2
2	Central Arkansas	21–6
3	McNeese	18–9
4	Northwestern State	16–11
5	Southeastern Louisiana	14–10
6	Houston Baptist	15–12
7	Sam Houston	14–13
8	Abilene Christian	10–17

- Incarnate Word, Nicholls, Lamar, and Texas A&M–Corpus Christi failed to qualify as members in the tournament field. New Orleans does not sponsor a softball team.

== Tournament ==
Round	Game	Time*	Matchup	Score	Attendance	Notes	Television
First day – Tuesday, May 12, 2021
1	1	5:00 pm	No. 6 Houston Baptist vs. No. 7 Sam Houston State	3–4	172		ESPN+
1	2	7:30 pm	No. 2 Southeastern Louisiana vs. No. 8 Abilene Christian	4–3	222		ESPN+
Second day – Thursday, May 13, 2021
2
2	3	11:00 am	No. 3 McNeese State vs. No. 7 Sam Houston State	3–1	277		ESPN+
2	4	1:30 pm	No. 4 Northwestern State vs No. 5 Southeastern Louisiana	7–4	343		ESPN+
2	5	4:00 pm	No. 2 Central Arkansas vs. No. 3 McNeese State	5–6	335		ESPN+
6	7:20 pm	No. 1 Stephen F. Austin vs. No. 4 Northwestern State	4–1	335			ESPN+
Third day – Friday, May 14, 2021
3
3	7	11:00 am	No. 5 Southeastern Louisiana vs. No. 2 Central Arkansas	1–2	275	Elimination game (Southeastern Louisiana)	ESPN+
3	8	1:30 pm	No. 7 Sam Houston State vs. No. 4 Northwestern State	0–8^{5}	242	Elimination game (Sam Houston State)	ESPN+
3	9	4:00 pm	No. 3 McNeese vs. No. 1 Stephen F. Austin	4–1	304		ESPN+
10	6:30 pm	No. 2 Central Arkansas vs. No. 4 Northwestern State	5–2	339	Elimination Game (Northwestern State)		ESPN+
Championship – Saturday, May 15, 2021
4
4	11	11:00 pm	No. 1 Stephen F. Austin vs. No. 2 Central Arkansas	4–5	307	Elimination Game (Stephen F. Austin)	ESPN+
4	12	1:50 pm	No. 2 Central Arkansas vs. No. 1 McNeese	0–1	345	McNeese tournament champion	ESPN+
*Game times in CDT. #-Rankings denote tournament seeding.

== Awards and honors ==
Tournament MVP: Whitney Tate, McNeese

All-Tournament Teams: Source:

Whitney Tate, McNeese - MVP
Haylee Brinlee, McNeese
Jenna Edwards, McNeese
Kaylee Lopez, McNeese
Cori McCrary, McNeese
Toni Perrin, McNeese
Kayla Beaver, Central Arkansas
Mary Kate Brown, Central Arkansas
Cylla Hill, Central Arkansas
Kaylyn Shepherd, Central Arkansas
Kristen Whitehouse, Central Arkansas
Mackenzie Bennett, Stephen F. Austin

== See also ==
2021 Southland Conference baseball tournament
