= 2021 Southeastern Louisiana Lady Lions softball team =

American college softball season

2021 Southeastern Louisiana Lady Lions softball
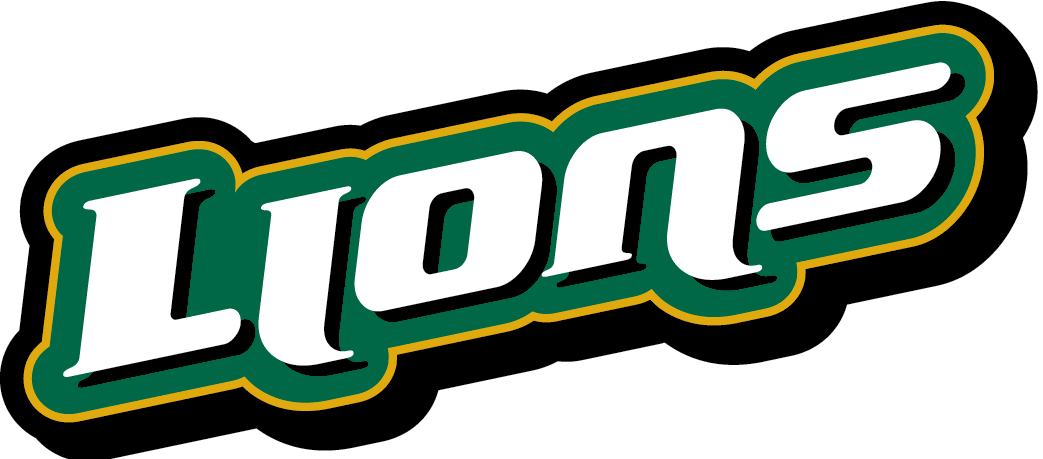
- Conference: Southland Conference
- Record: 28–23 (14–10 Southland)
- Head coach: Rick Fremin (6th season)
- Assistant coaches: Jack Byerley; Katie Godwin
- Home stadium: North Oak Park

2021 Southland Conference softball standings
	Conf.				Overall
Team	W		L	PCT	W		L	PCT
Stephen F. Austin ‍†‍‍	25	–	2	.926	35	–	12	.745
Central Arkansas ‍‍‍	21	–	6	.778	37	–	19	.661
McNeese State ‍‍‡‍^{y}	18	–	9	.667	35	–	26	.574
Northwestern State ‍‍‍	16	–	11	.593	24	–	22	.522
Southeastern Louisiana ‍‍‍	14	–	10	.583	28	–	23	.549
Houston Baptist ‍‍‍	15	–	12	.556	22	–	17	.564
Sam Houston State ‍‍‍	14	–	13	.519	19	–	31	.380
Abilene Christian ‍‍‍	10	–	17	.370	14	–	33	.298
Incarnate Word ‍‍‍	9	–	18	.333	16	–	27	.372
Texas A&M–Corpus Christi ‍‍‍	8	–	16	.333	18	–	30	.375
Nicholls ‍‍‍	5	–	22	.185	12	–	28	.300
Lamar ‍‍‍	4	–	23	.148	8	–	43	.157
† – Conference champion ‡ – Tournament champion y – Invited to the NCAA tournament As of May 22, 2021; Rankings from NFCA

The 2021 Southeastern Louisiana Lady Lions softball team represented Southeastern Louisiana University during the 2021 NCAA Division I softball season. The Lady Lions played their home games at North Oak Park and were led by sixth-year head coach Rick Fremin. They were members of the Southland Conference.

== Preseason ==
=== Southland Conference Coaches Poll ===
The Southland Conference Coaches Poll was released on February 5, 2021. Southeastern Louisiana was picked to finish third in the Southland Conference with 183 votes.

Coaches poll
Predicted finish	Team	Votes (1st place)
1	Stephen F. Austin	235 (17)
2	McNeese State	217 (4)
3	Southeastern Louisiana	183
4	Sam Houston State	172 (1)
5	Central Arkansas	162 (1)
6	Northwestern State	156 (1)
7	Nicholls	131
8	Lamar	86
9	Abilene Christian	82
10	Houston Baptist	81
11	Texas A&M–Corpus Christi	47
12	Incarnate Word	32

=== Preseason All-Southland team ===
==== First Team ====
- Kaylyn Shephard (UCA, R-SR, 1st Base)
- Cayla Joens (NSU, JR, 2nd Base)
- Cylla Hall (UCA, R-SR, 3rd Base)
- Cori McCrary (MCNS, SR, Shortstop)
- Ella Manzer (SELA, SR, Catcher)
- Samantha Bradley (ACU, R-SR, Designated Player)
- Linsey Tomlinson (ACU, R-SR, Outfielder)
- Kaylee Lopez (MCNS, SO, Outfielder)
- Elise Vincent (NSU, SR, Outfielder)
- Madisen Blackford (SELA, SR, Outfielder)
- Megan McDonald (SHSU, SR, Outfielder)
- Kayla Beaver (UCA, R-FR, Pitcher)
- Kassidy Wilbur (SFA, JR, Pitcher)
- E. C. Delafield (NSU, JR, Utility)

==== Second Team ====
- Shaylon Govan (SFA, SO, 1st Base)
- Brooke Malia (SHSU, SR, 2nd Base)
- Bryana Novegil (SFA, SR, 2nd Base)
- Caitlin Garcia (NICH, JR, 3rd Base)
- Alex Hudspeth (SFA, JR, Shortstop)
- Alexis Perry (NSU, SO, Catcher)
- Bailey Richards (SFA, SR, Catcher)
- Caitlyn Brockway (HBU, SO, Designated Player)
- Reagan Sperling (UCA, R-JR, Outfielder)
- Alayis Seneca (MCNS, SO, Outfielder)
- Hayley Barbazon (NSU, SR, Outfielder)
- Saleen Flores (MCNS, SO, Pitcher)
- MC Comeaux (SELA, FR, Pitcher)
- Sammi Thomas (TAMUCC, SO, Utility)

=== National Softball Signing Day ===
Player	Position	Hometown	Previous Team
Blaire Bizette	Utility	New Roads, Louisiana	Catholic-Pointe Coupee HS
Sarah Diaz	Infielder	Lafayette, Louisiana	Lafayette Christian
Taylor Duncan	Utility	Lake, Mississippi	Lake HS
Alexis Findley	Pitcher	Jefferson City, Missouri	Blair Oaks HS
Elise Jones	Utility	Livingston, Louisiana	Doyle HS
Leah Marshall	Pitcher	Mississauga, Ontario, Canada	Mount Dora Christian
Madison Watson	Utility	Baton Rouge, Louisiana	Parkview Baptist

== Roster ==
2021 Southeastern Louisiana Lady Lions roster
Pitchers: 6 Karlee Kraft - Sophomore; 9 Kassie Salling - Freshman; 10 MC Comeaux - Freshman; 18 Sophie Hannabas - Sophomore; 20 Alyssa Romano - Freshman; 22 Heather Zumo - Senior; 28 Shelby Sitzman - Senior; Outfielders: 1 Anna Rodenberg - Senior; 12 Audrey Greely - Freshman; 17 Aeriyl Mass - Junior; 24 Kylie Chauvin - Freshman; 31 Cameron Goodman - Freshman	Catchers: Ella Manzer - Senior; 25 Madisen Blackford - Senior; Infielders: 2 Cameron Beal - Senior; 3 Lindsey Rizzo - Junior; 4 Lexi Johnson - Freshman; 5 Kelci Bodin - Senior; 11 Ellie Dubois - Freshman; 13 Madison Watson - Senior; 19 Sadie Hewitt - Freshman; 23 Briahna Bennett - Junior

=== Coaching staff ===
2021 Southeastern Louisiana Lady Lions coaching staff
- Rick Fremin – Head Coach – 6th year
- Jack Byerley – Assistant Head Coach – 2nd year
- Katie Godwin – Assistant Head Coach – 3rd year
- Alana Fremin – Volunteer Assistant Coach – 6th year

== Schedule and results ==
Legend
	Southeastern Louisiana win
	Southeastern Louisiana loss
	Postponement/Cancellation
**Bold**	Southeastern Louisiana team member

2021 Southeastern Louisiana Lady Lions softball game log
Regular season (27–21)

February (7–6)
Date	Opponent	Rank	Site/stadium	Score	Win	Loss	Save	TV	Attendance	Overall record	SLC record
Lion Classic
Feb. 11	South Dakota		STA Softball Field • Hammond, LA	**W** 11-0	**Zumo** (1–0)	Fletcher (0–1)	None		116	1-0	
Feb. 12	South Dakota		STA Softball Field • Hammond, LA	**W** 14-9	**Comeaux** (1–0)	Fletcher (0–2)	None		128	2-0	
Feb. 12	South Dakota		STA Softball Field • Hammond, LA	**W** 17-15	**Zumo** (2–0)	Lisko (0–1)	None		128	3-0	
Feb. 13	South Dakota		STA Softball Field • Hammond, LA	**L** 3-9	Lisko (1-1)	**DuBois** (0–1)	None		128	3-1	
Feb. 13	North Texas		STA Softball Field • Hammond, LA	**L** 2-6	Trautwein (1–0)	**Comeaux** (1-1)	None		128	3-2	
Feb. 17	at No. 22 Mississippi State		Nusz Park • Starkville, MS	Game postponed due to threat of freezing rain/sleet/snow in Starkville							
UAB Green and Gold Classic
Feb. 20	vs. Jacksonville State		Mary Bowers Field • Birmingham, AL	**W** 2-1	**Zumo** (3–0)	Brown (0–1)	None		73	4-2	
Feb. 20	at UAB		Mary Bowers Field • Birmingham, AL	**L** 6-14 (6 inns)	Golliver (1–0)	**Comeaux** (1–2)	None		75	4-3	
Feb. 21	vs. No. 9 Louisiana		Mary Bowers Field • Birmingham, AL	**L** 1-9 (6 inns)	Lamb (2–0)	**Hannabas** (0–1)	None		55	4-4	
Feb. 21	at UAB		Mary Bowers Field • Birmingham, AL	**L** 1-6	Valbak (1–0)	**Zumo** (3–1)	None		112	4-5	
FSU Unconquered Invitational
Feb. 26	vs. Florida A&M		JoAnne Graf Field at the Seminole Softball Complex • Tallahassee, FL	**W** 11-1 (5 inns)	**Zumo** (4–1)	Williams (0–1)	None			5-5	
Feb. 26	vs. Florida A&M		JoAnne Graf Field at the Seminole Softball Complex • Tallahassee, FL	**W** 12-3	**Comeaux** (2-2)	Boatwright (0–1)	None			6-5	
Feb. 27	at No. 15 Florida State		JoAnne Graf Field at the Seminole Softball Complex • Tallahassee, FL	**L** 0-3	Arnold (3–1)	**Hannabas** (0–2)	None	ACCN+	199	6-6	
Feb. 28	vs. Florida Gulf Coast		JoAnne Graf Field at the Seminole Softball Complex • Tallahassee, FL	**W** 1-0	**Zumo** (5–1)	Bauman (2–3)	None		26	7-6	

March (10–7)
Date	Opponent	Rank	Site/stadium	Score	Win	Loss	Save	TV	Attendance	Overall record	SLC record
Mar. 3	Louisiana Tech		North Oak Park • Hammond, LA	**W** 4-3	**Zumo** (6–1)	Pickett (0–2)	None		205	8-6	
Mar. 3	Louisiana Tech		North Oak Park • Hammond, LA	Cancelled							
Auburn Invitational
Mar. 5	vs. Troy		Jane B. Moore Field • Auburn, AL	**L** 6-9	Johnson (8–2)	**Comeaux** (1–3)	None		370	8-7	
Mar. 5	vs. Troy		Jane B. Moore Field • Auburn, AL	**L** 6-9	Blasingame (2–0)	**Zumo** (6–2)	None		370	8-8	
Mar. 6	at No. 24 Auburn		Jane B. Moore Field • Auburn, AL	**W** 2-9	Lowe (5–0)	**Comeaux** (1–4)	None		370	8-9	
Mar. 6	at No. 24 Auburn		Jane B. Moore Field • Auburn, AL	**W** 1-9 (6 inns)	Dismukes (2–0)	**Sitzman** (0–1)	None		370	8-10	
Mar. 10	Southern Miss		North Oak Park • Hammond, LA	**W** 1-0	**Comeaux** (3–4)	Pierce (1–4)	**DuBois** (1)		232	9-10	
Mar. 12	Lamar		North Oak Park • Hammond, LA	**W** 6-2	**Zumo** (7–2)	Ruiz (1–6)	**DuBois** (2)	ESPN+	243	10-10	1–0
Mar. 12	Lamar		North Oak Park • Hammond, LA	**W** 8-1	**Comeaux** (4-4)	Mixon (1–4)	None	ESPN+	243	11-10	2–0
Mar. 13	Lamar		North Oak Park • Hammond, LA	**W** 7-3	**Comeaux** (5–4)	Williams (0–4)	None		245	12-10	3–0
Mar. 16	No. 12 LSU		North Oak Park • Hammond, LA	**L** 1-12	Kilponen (4–3)	**Comeaux** (5-5)	None	ESPN+	250	12-11	
Mar. 19	at Houston Baptist		Husky Field • Houston, TX	**W** 2-1	**Zumo** (8–2)	Patak (3–5)	**DuBois** (3)		95	13-11	4–0
Mar. 19	at Houston Baptist		Husky Field • Houston, TX	**L** 5-6	Swanson (2–0)	**Hannabas** (0–3)	None		90	13-12	4–1
Mar. 20	at Houston Baptist		Husky Field • Houston, TX	**W** 9-4	**Zumo** (8–2)	Janes (0–1)	None		55	14-12	5–1
Mar. 24	at Louisiana–Monroe		Geo-Surfaces Field at the ULM Softball Complex • Monroe, LA	**W** 2-1	**Comeaux** (6–5)	Chavarria (1–3)	**DuBois** (4)		296	15-12	
Mar. 26	Abilene Christian		North Oak Park • Hammond, LA	**W** 6-2	**Hannabas** (1–3)	Bradley (3–10)	None	ESPN+	245	16-12	6–1
Mar. 26	Abilene Christian		North Oak Park • Hammond, LA	**L** 4-5	White (4–7)	**DuBois** (0–2)	None	ESPN+	245	16-13	6–2
Mar. 27	Abilene Christian		North Oak Park • Hammond, LA	**W** 5-0	**Zumo** (10–2)	Bradley (3–11)	None	ESPN+	233	17-13	7–2

April (9–5)
Date	Opponent	Rank	Site/stadium	Score	Win	Loss	Save	TV	Attendance	Overall record	SLC record
Apr. 2	at Nicholls		Swanner Field at Geo Surfaces Park • Thibodaux, LA	**W** 6-1	**Zumo** (11–2)	Westbrook (2-2)	None		244	18-13	8–2
Apr. 2	at Nicholls		Swanner Field at the Geo Surfaces Park • Thibodaux, LA	**W** 5-3	**Comeaux** (7–5)	Westbrook (2–3)	None		205	19-13	9–2
Apr. 3	at Nicholls		Swanner Field at Geo Surfaces Park • Thibodaux, LA	**W** 7-4	**Zumo** (12–2)	Westbrook (2–4)	None		200	20-13	10–2
Apr. 5	Mississippi State		North Oak Park • Hammond, LA	**W** 6-4	**Comeaux** (8–5)	Williams (3-3)	**DuBois** (5)	ESPN+	250	21-13	
Apr. 9	McNeese State		North Oak Park • Hammond, LA	**W** 3-2	**Zumo** (13–2)	Vallejo (2–6)	None		245	22-13	11–2
Apr. 10	McNeese State		North Oak Park • Hammond, LA	**W** 3-2	**Hannabas** (2–3)	Flores (5–7)	**DuBois** (6)		243	23-13	12–2
Apr. 11	McNeese State		North Oak Park • Hammond, LA	**L** 1-3	Vallejo (3–6)	**Sitzman** (0–2)	None		245	23-14	12–3
Apr. 13	at No. 14 Louisiana		Yvette Girouard Field at Lamson Park • Lafayette, LA	Game Cancelled due to threat of inclement weather in Lafayette							
Apr. 17	at Sam Houston State		Bearkat Softball Complex • Huntsville, TX	**W** 13-0 (5 inns)	**Zumo** (14–2)	Dunn (5–7)	None	ESPN+	115	24-14	13–3
Apr. 17	at Sam Houston State		Bearkat Softball Complex • Huntsville, TX	**L** 0-8 (6 inns)	Vento (6–5)	**Hannabas** (2–4)	None	ESPN+	115	24-15	13–4
Apr. 18	at Sam Houston State		Bearkat Softball Complex • Huntsville, TX	**L** 2-4	Vento (7–5)	**Zumo** (14–3)	None		115	24-16	13–5
Apr. 21	Louisiana–Monroe		North Oak Park • Hammond, LA	**W** 7-1	**Zumo** (15–3)	Chavarria (1–8)	None	ESPN+	245	25-16	
Apr. 23	Texas A&M–Corpus Christi		North Oak Park • Hammond, LA	Game cancelled							
Apr. 23	Texas A&M–Corpus Christi		North Oak Park • Hammond, LA	Game cancelled							
Apr. 24	Texas A&M–Corpus Christi		North Oak Park • Hammond, LA	Game cancelled							
Apr. 27	Southern		North Oak Park • Hammond, LA	**W** 8-0 (5 inns)	**Romano** (1–0)	Donaldson (4–10)	None	ESPN+	204	26-16	
Apr. 30	Central Arkansas		North Oak Park • Hammond, LA	**L** 0-6	Johnson (10–7)	**Zumo** (15–4)	None	ESPN+	224	26-17	13–6
Apr. 30	Central Arkansas		North Oak Park • Hammond, LA	**L** 0-5	Beaver (16–6)	**Hannabas** (2–5)	None	ESPN+	224	26-18	13–7

May (1–3)
Date	Opponent	Rank	Site/stadium	Score	Win	Loss	Save	TV	Attendance	Overall record	SLC record
May 1	Central Arkansas		North Oak Park • Hammond, LA	**L** 6-7	Beaver (17–6)	**Zumo** (15–5)	None	ESPN+	245	26-19	13–8
May 4	Jackson State		North Oak Park • Hammond, LA	Game cancelled							
May 4	Jackson State		North Oak Park • Hammond, LA	Game cancelled							
May 7	at Northwestern State		Lady Demon Diamond • Natchitoches, LA	**L** 4-9	Delafield (10–4)	**Zumo** (15–6)	None		200	26-20	13–9
May 7	at Northwestern State		Lady Demon Diamond • Natchitoches, LA	**L** 5-13 (5 inns)	Seely (1–2)	**Hannabas** (2–6)	None		200	26-21	13–10
May 8	at Northwestern State		Lady Demon Diamond • Natchitoches, LA	**W** 7-2	**Comeaux** (8–6)	Rhoden (4–5)	None		150	27-21	14–10

Post-Season (1–2)

Southland Tournament (1–2)
Date	Opponent	(Seed)/Rank	Site/stadium	Score	Win	Loss	Save	TV	Attendance	Overall record	SLC record
May 12	vs. (8) Abilene Christian	(5)	North Oak Park • Hammond, LA	**W** 4-3	**Zumo** (16–6)	Bradley (10–14)	None	ESPN+	222	28-21	
May 13	vs. (4) Northwestern State	(5)	North Oak Park • Hammond, LA	**L** 4-7	Delafield (11–4)	**Kraft** (0–1)	None	ESPN+	343	28-22	
May 14	vs. (2) Central Arkansas	(5)	North Oak Park • Hammond, LA	**L** 1-2	Beaver (19–6)	**Zumo** (16–7)	None	ESPN+	275	28-23	

Schedule source:*Rankings are based on the team's current ranking in the NFCA/USA Softball poll.

== Postseason ==
=== Conference Accolades ===
- Player of the Year: Kassidy Wilbur – SFA
- Hitter of the Year: Shaylon Govan – SFA
- Pitcher of the Year: Kassidy Wilbur – SFA
- Freshman of the Year: Jenna Wildeman – UCA
- Newcomer of the Year: Jenna Edwards – MCNS
- Coach of the Year: Nicole Dickson – SFA

All Conference First Team

- Shaylon Govan (SFA)
- Bryana Novegil (SFA)
- Haylee Brinlee (MCNS)
- Cori McCrary (MCNS)
- Heidi Jaquez (HBU)
- E. C. Delafield (NSU)
- Mackenzie Bennett (SFA)
- Jenna Wildeman (UCA)
- Megan McDonald (SHSU)
- Aeriyl Mass (SELA)
- Kayla Beaver (UCA)
- Kassidy Wilbur (SFA)

All Conference Second Team

- Kaylyn Shephard (UCA)
- Mary Kate Brown (UCA)
- Lindsey Rizzo (SELA)
- Camryn Middlebrook (SFA)
- Hannah Scheaffer (SHSU)
- Gaby Garcia (SFA)
- Kaylee Lopez (MCNS)
- Donelle Johnson (ACU)
- Jil Poullard (MCNS)
- Audrey Greely (SELA)
- Jordan Johnson (UCA)
- Whitney Tate (MCNS)

All Conference Third Team

- Caitlyn Brockway (HBU)
- Cayla Jones (NSU)
- Alex Hedspeth (SFA)
- Ashlyn Reavis (NICH)
- Chloe Gomez (MCNS)
- Jasie Roberts (HBU)
- Anna Rodenberg (SELA)
- Kaitlyn St. Clair (NSU)
- Sheridan Fisher (SHSU)
- Pal Egan (TAMUCC)
- Lyndie Swanson (HBU)
- Heather Zumo (SELA)
