= Oskaloosa, Kansas =

- City and County seat
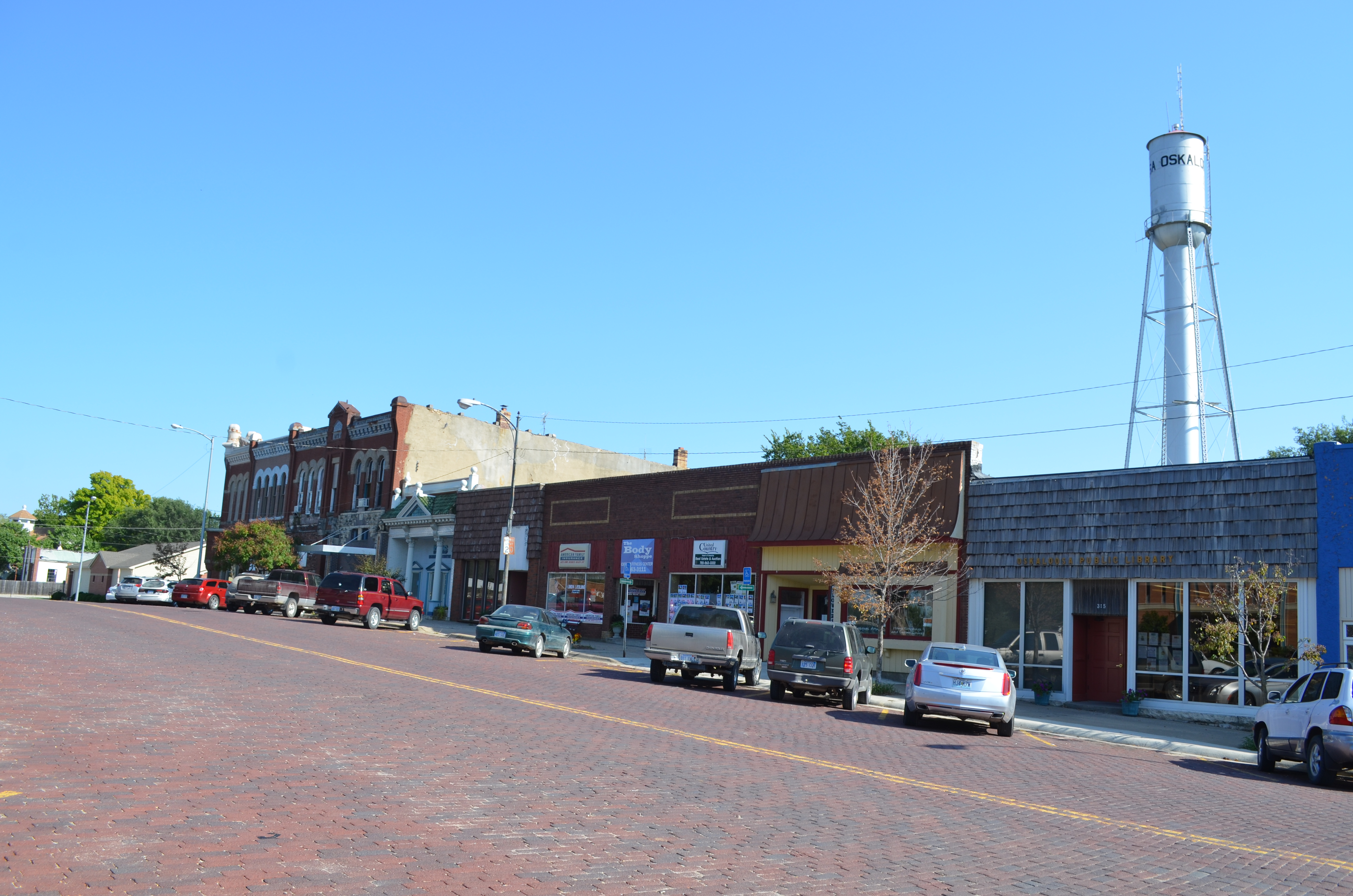
- Business district of Oskaloosa (2014)

- Location within Jefferson County and Kansas

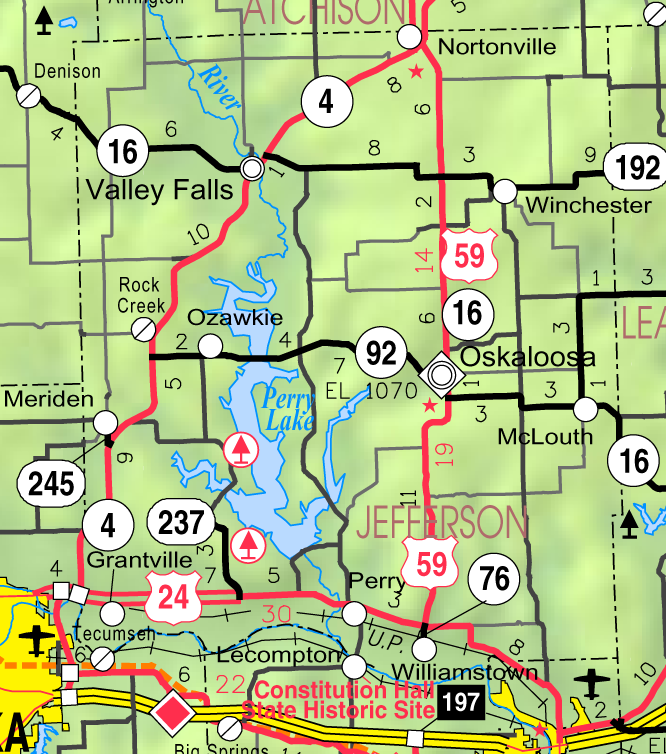
- KDOT map of Jefferson County (legend)
- Coordinates: 39°12′57″N 95°18′50″W
- Country: United States
- State: Kansas
- County: Jefferson
- Founded: 1856
- Incorporated: 1869
- Named for: Oskaloosa, Iowa

Area
  - Total: 1.00 sq mi (2.59 km^{2})
  - Land: 0.99 sq mi (2.57 km^{2})
  - Water: 0.0039 sq mi (0.01 km^{2})
- Elevation: 1,116 ft (340 m)

Population (2020)
  - Total: 1,110
  - Density: 1,120/sq mi (432/km^{2})
- Time zone: UTC-6 (CST)
  - Summer (DST): UTC-5 (CDT)
- ZIP Code: 66066
- Area code: 785
- FIPS code: 20-53375
- GNIS ID: 478510
- Website: cityofoskaloosaks.org

Oskaloosa is a city in and the county seat of Jefferson County, Kansas, United States. As of the 2020 census, the population of the city was 1,110.

== History ==
Oskaloosa was founded in 1856. It was named after the city of Oskaloosa, Iowa. The first post office in Oskaloosa was established in November 1856.

In 1888, Oskaloosa citizens elected Mary D. Lowman mayor with a city council composed entirely of women, making the city the first in the state to elect an all-women city administration.

== Geography ==
Oskaloosa is located at 39°12′57″N 95°18′50″W (39.215849, -95.313800). It is at the intersection of U.S. Route 59 and K-92, approximately 15 miles north of Lawrence. According to the United States Census Bureau, the city has a total area of 1.03 square miles (2.67 km^{2}), of which 1.02 square miles (2.64 km^{2}) is land and 0.01 square miles (0.03 km^{2}) is water.

=== Climate ===
The climate in this area is characterized by hot, humid summers and generally cold winters. According to the Köppen Climate Classification system, Oskaloosa has a humid subtropical climate, abbreviated "Cfa" on climate maps.

Climate data for Oskaloosa, Kansas, 1991–2020 normals, extremes 1958–2011
Month	Jan	Feb	Mar	Apr	May	Jun	Jul	Aug	Sep	Oct	Nov	Dec	Year
Record high °F (°C)	73 (23)	82 (28)	87 (31)	92 (33)	94 (34)	109 (43)	110 (43)	108 (42)	108 (42)	97 (36)	84 (29)	70 (21)	110 (43)
Mean maximum °F (°C)	60.9 (16.1)	66.9 (19.4)	76.7 (24.8)	83.5 (28.6)	87.8 (31.0)	92.8 (33.8)	97.9 (36.6)	99.2 (37.3)	92.1 (33.4)	83.9 (28.8)	71.8 (22.1)	61.3 (16.3)	100.6 (38.1)
Mean daily maximum °F (°C)	38.1 (3.4)	44.5 (6.9)	55.7 (13.2)	65.9 (18.8)	75.8 (24.3)	85.3 (29.6)	89.9 (32.2)	88.1 (31.2)	80.0 (26.7)	68.3 (20.2)	53.5 (11.9)	41.6 (5.3)	65.6 (18.6)
Daily mean °F (°C)	28.0 (−2.2)	33.4 (0.8)	43.5 (6.4)	54.0 (12.2)	65.1 (18.4)	74.4 (23.6)	79.0 (26.1)	77.0 (25.0)	68.4 (20.2)	56.3 (13.5)	42.8 (6.0)	32.0 (0.0)	54.5 (12.5)
Mean daily minimum °F (°C)	17.9 (−7.8)	22.2 (−5.4)	31.3 (−0.4)	42.1 (5.6)	54.4 (12.4)	63.6 (17.6)	68.1 (20.1)	65.8 (18.8)	56.7 (13.7)	44.3 (6.8)	32.0 (0.0)	22.4 (−5.3)	43.4 (6.3)
Mean minimum °F (°C)	−0.6 (−18.1)	2.5 (−16.4)	12.6 (−10.8)	25.9 (−3.4)	39.6 (4.2)	49.7 (9.8)	57.0 (13.9)	54.0 (12.2)	39.3 (4.1)	27.4 (−2.6)	15.3 (−9.3)	1.1 (−17.2)	−7.0 (−21.7)
Record low °F (°C)	−20 (−29)	−15 (−26)	−11 (−24)	10 (−12)	28 (−2)	43 (6)	48 (9)	42 (6)	29 (−2)	16 (−9)	−1 (−18)	−24 (−31)	−24 (−31)
Average precipitation inches (mm)	0.98 (25)	1.32 (34)	2.52 (64)	3.51 (89)	5.31 (135)	5.36 (136)	4.53 (115)	4.76 (121)	3.36 (85)	2.92 (74)	1.96 (50)	1.81 (46)	38.34 (974)
Average snowfall inches (cm)	4.7 (12)	4.5 (11)	1.6 (4.1)	0.1 (0.25)	0.0 (0.0)	0.0 (0.0)	0.0 (0.0)	0.0 (0.0)	0.0 (0.0)	0.5 (1.3)	1.1 (2.8)	3.9 (9.9)	16.4 (41.35)
Average precipitation days (≥ 0.01 in)	4.0	4.0	6.4	8.4	9.3	9.4	8.0	7.1	7.3	6.2	4.8	3.9	78.8
Average snowy days (≥ 0.1 in)	2.3	1.6	0.6	0.1	0.0	0.0	0.0	0.0	0.0	0.0	0.6	2.0	7.2
Source: NOAA (mean maxima/minima 1981–2010)

== Demographics ==
Historical population
Census	Pop.	Note	%±
1860	631		—
1870	640		1.4%
1880	725		13.3%
1890	773		6.6%
1900	978		26.5%
1910	851		−13.0%
1920	700		−17.7%
1930	733		4.7%
1940	800		9.1%
1950	721		−9.9%
1960	807		11.9%
1970	955		18.3%
1980	1,092		14.3%
1990	1,074		−1.6%
2000	1,165		8.5%
2010	1,113		−4.5%
2020	1,110		−0.3%
U.S. Decennial Census

Oskaloosa is part of the Topeka metropolitan area.

=== 2020 census ===
The 2020 United States census counted 1,110 people, 411 households, and 255 families in Oskaloosa. The population density was 1,116.7 per square mile (431.2/km^{2}). There were 459 housing units at an average density of 461.8 per square mile (178.3/km^{2}). The racial makeup was 91.8% (1,019) white or European American (89.82% non-Hispanic white), 0.27% (3) black or African-American, 0.54% (6) Native American or Alaska Native, 0.36% (4) Asian, 0.09% (1) Pacific Islander or Native Hawaiian, 0.9% (10) from other races, and 6.04% (67) from two or more races. Hispanic or Latino of any race was 3.6% (40) of the population.

Of the 411 households, 31.4% had children under the age of 18; 45.0% were married couples living together; 27.3% had a female householder with no spouse or partner present. 30.2% of households consisted of individuals and 15.6% had someone living alone who was 65 years of age or older. The average household size was 2.2 and the average family size was 2.9. The percent of those with a bachelor's degree or higher was estimated to be 19.1% of the population.

26.3% of the population was under the age of 18, 6.4% from 18 to 24, 25.5% from 25 to 44, 24.5% from 45 to 64, and 17.3% who were 65 years of age or older. The median age was 38.7 years. For every 100 females, there were 93.7 males. For every 100 females ages 18 and older, there were 95.2 males.

The 2016–2020 5-year American Community Survey estimates show that the median household income was $54,783 (with a margin of error of +/- $6,925) and the median family income was $86,806 (+/- $11,777). Males had a median income of $41,833 (+/- $15,554) versus $28,500 (+/- $20,563) for females. The median income for those above 16 years old was $36,389 (+/- $10,056). Approximately, 6.5% of families and 9.1% of the population were below the poverty line, including 17.0% of those under the age of 18 and 3.3% of those ages 65 or over.

=== 2010 census ===
As of the census of 2010, there were 1,113 people, 435 households, and 281 families living in the city. The population density was 1,091.2 inhabitants per square mile (421.3/km^{2}). There were 480 housing units at an average density of 470.6 per square mile (181.7/km^{2}). The racial makeup of the city was 97.0% White, 0.2% African American, 0.8% Native American, 0.3% Asian, 0.1% from other races, and 1.6% from two or more races. Hispanic or Latino of any race were 0.9% of the population.

There were 435 households, of which 33.1% had children under the age of 18 living with them, 43.2% were married couples living together, 16.8% had a female householder with no husband present, 4.6% had a male householder with no wife present, and 35.4% were non-families. 29.2% of all households were made up of individuals, and 14.5% had someone living alone who was 65 years of age or older. The average household size was 2.43 and the average family size was 3.03.

The median age in the city was 39.3 years. 24.5% of residents were under the age of 18; 9% were between the ages of 18 and 24; 23.1% were from 25 to 44; 24.8% were from 45 to 64; and 18.4% were 65 years of age or older. The gender makeup of the city was 50.3% male and 49.7% female.

== Education ==
The community is served by Oskaloosa USD 341 public school district, which has a high school, middle school, and elementary school.

== Media ==
Oskaloosa is the host of The Oskaloosa Independent, the official newspaper of Jefferson County, which publishes weekly on Thursdays. The Independent was founded by J.W. Roberts, the great-grandfather of Sen. Pat Roberts. The masthead says The Independent was established in 1860 and is six months older than the state of Kansas. The Independent is currently owned by Davis Publications, which also owns The Valley Falls Vindicator. Holly Allen is the managing editor and Wesley Cudney is the main reporter covering the East side of Jefferson County.

== Notable people ==
- Roger Barker, sociologist who studied everyday life in Oskaloosa.
- McKinley Burnett, leading figure in Brown v. Board of Education.
- James Reynolds, actor on Days of Our Lives for over 30 years.
- C. Wesley Roberts, chairman of the Republican Party, father of U.S. Senator Pat Roberts.
- Dummy Taylor, deaf Major League Baseball pitcher.
