= Oskaloosa High School (Kansas) =

Location
- 404 Park Street; Oskaloosa, Kansas 66066; United States; 39°13′17″N 95°18′52″W

Information
- School type: Public, High School
- School district: USD 341
- CEEB code: 172270
- Staff: 11.94 (FTE)
- Grades: 7-12
- Enrollment: 258 (2023–2024)
- Student to teacher ratio: 21.60
- Color
- Team name: Bears
- Website: School website

Oskaloosa High School is the public high school in Oskaloosa, Kansas, United States. The school serves about 250 students. Bears are the school mascot and the school colors are blue and red. Oskaloosa High School is located at 404 Park Street.

== History ==
Oskaloosa was one of the high schools involved in court battles over segregated schools and the integration of African Americans in the late 19th century and very early 20th century.

The principal tried to censor an article in the student newspaper in 2003, but an appeal to the school board, recording of the principal making demands on the student, and a state law protecting student publications (Kansas Student Publications Act of 1992) from administrative censorship triumphed. The student went on to major in journalism at the University of Missouri, worked as a television new reporter, and secured a communications job at Johns Hopkins radiology department.

== Notable alumni ==
- James Reynolds, actor on Days of Our Lives (TV soap opera) for over 30 years.
- Long serving Oskaloosa doctor Marlin S. McCreight graduated with the first graduating class from the school in 1889.

== See also ==
- List of high schools in Kansas
- List of unified school districts in Kansas

== School website ==
- Oskaloosa Junior/Senior High School website
- USD 341 School District Boundary Map - KDOT
- Oskaloosa City Map - KDOT
