= 2021 Stephen F. Austin Ladyjacks softball team =

American college softball season

2021 Stephen F. Austin Ladyjacks softball

Southland Conference Regular Season champions
- Conference: Southland Conference
- Record: 35–12 (25–2 Southland)
- Head coach: Nicole Dickson (5th season)
- Assistant coaches: Brynn Baca; Morgan Spearman
- Home stadium: SFA Softball Field

2021 Southland Conference softball standings
| | Conf. | | | | Overall |
| Team | W | | L | PCT | W | | L | PCT |
|---|---|---|---|---|---|---|---|---|
| Stephen F. Austin ‍†‍‍ | 25 | – | 2 | .926 | 35 | – | 12 | .745 |
| Central Arkansas ‍‍‍ | 21 | – | 6 | .778 | 37 | – | 19 | .661 |
| McNeese State ‍‍‡‍^{y} | 18 | – | 9 | .667 | 35 | – | 26 | .574 |
| Northwestern State ‍‍‍ | 16 | – | 11 | .593 | 24 | – | 22 | .522 |
| Southeastern Louisiana ‍‍‍ | 14 | – | 10 | .583 | 28 | – | 23 | .549 |
| Houston Baptist ‍‍‍ | 15 | – | 12 | .556 | 22 | – | 17 | .564 |
| Sam Houston State ‍‍‍ | 14 | – | 13 | .519 | 19 | – | 31 | .380 |
| Abilene Christian ‍‍‍ | 10 | – | 17 | .370 | 14 | – | 33 | .298 |
| Incarnate Word ‍‍‍ | 9 | – | 18 | .333 | 16 | – | 27 | .372 |
| Texas A&M–Corpus Christi ‍‍‍ | 8 | – | 16 | .333 | 18 | – | 30 | .375 |
| Nicholls ‍‍‍ | 5 | – | 22 | .185 | 12 | – | 28 | .300 |
| Lamar ‍‍‍ | 4 | – | 23 | .148 | 8 | – | 43 | .157 |
† – Conference champion ‡ – Tournament champion y – Invited to the NCAA tournament As of May 22, 2021; Rankings from NFCA

The 2021 Stephen F. Austin Ladyjacks softball team represented Stephen F. Austin State University in the 2021 NCAA Division I softball season. The Ladyjacks played their home games at SFA Softball Field and were led by fifth year head coach Nicole Dickson. They were members of the Southland Conference.

== Preseason ==
=== Southland Conference Coaches Poll ===
The Southland Conference Coaches Poll was released on February 5, 2021. Stephen F. Austin was picked to finish first in the Southland Conference with 235 votes and 17 first place votes.

Coaches poll
| Predicted finish | Team | Votes (1st place) |
| 1 | Stephen F. Austin | 235 (17) |
| 2 | McNeese State | 217 (4) |
| 3 | Southeastern Louisiana | 183 |
| 4 | Sam Houston State | 172 (1) |
| 5 | Central Arkansas | 162 (1) |
| 6 | Northwestern State | 156 (1) |
| 7 | Nicholls | 131 |
| 8 | Lamar | 86 |
| 9 | Abilene Christian | 82 |
| 10 | Houston Baptist | 81 |
| 11 | Texas A&M–Corpus Christi | 47 |
| 12 | Incarnate Word | 32 |

=== Preseason All-Southland team ===
==== First Team ====
- Kaylyn Shephard (UCA, R-SR, 1st Base)
- Cayla Joens (NSU, JR, 2nd Base)
- Cylla Hall (UCA, R-SR, 3rd Base)
- Cori McCrary (MCNS, SR, Shortstop)
- Ella Manzer (SELA, SR, Catcher)
- Samantha Bradley (ACU, R-SR, Designated Player)
- Linsey Tomlinson (ACU, R-SR, Outfielder)
- Kaylee Lopez (MCNS, SO, Outfielder)
- Elise Vincent (NSU, SR, Outfielder)
- Madisen Blackford (SELA, SR, Outfielder)
- Megan McDonald (SHSU, SR, Outfielder)
- Kayla Beaver (UCA, R-FR, Pitcher)
- Kassidy Wilbur (SFA, JR, Pitcher)
- E. C. Delafield (NSU, JR, Utility)

==== Second Team ====
- Shaylon Govan (SFA, SO, 1st Base)
- Brooke Malia (SHSU, SR, 2nd Base)
- Bryana Novegil (SFA, SR, 2nd Base)
- Caitlin Garcia (NICH, JR, 3rd Base)
- Alex Hudspeth (SFA, JR, Shortstop)
- Alexis Perry (NSU, SO, Catcher)
- Bailey Richards (SFA, SR, Catcher)
- Caitlyn Brockway (HBU, SO, Designated Player)
- Reagan Sperling (UCA, R-JR, Outfielder)
- Alayis Seneca (MCNS, SO, Outfielder)
- Hayley Barbazon (NSU, SR, Outfielder)"
- Saleen Flores (MCNS, SO, Pitcher)
- MC Comeaux (SELA, FR, Pitcher)
- Sammi Thomas (TAMUCC, SO, Utility)

=== National Softball Signing Day ===
| Player | Position | Hometown | Previous Team |
|---|---|---|---|
| Mikaelah Burkland | Liberty, Texas | Liberty HS | |
| Ryleigh Mata | Utility | Santa Fe, Texas | Santa Fe HS |
| Emily Berryhill | Outfielder | Leander, Texas | Glenn HS |
| Dahkotah Pool | Shortstop | Cuypress, Texas | Cy-Fair HS |
| Sydney Carithers | Catcher/Utility | Fort Worth, Texas | Brewer HS |
| Alexis Telford | Pitcher | Allen, Texas | Allen HS |
| Kelby Robbins | Infielder | Mansfield, Texas | Legacy HS |
| Kassie Rhodes | Pitcher | Quitman, Arkansas | Quitman HS |
| Brooke Gainous | Pitcher | Kingwood, Texas | Kingwood Park HS |
| Kaleigh Vega | Pitcher | Lovington, Texas | Lovington HS |

== Roster ==
2021 Stephen F. Austin Ladyjacks roster
| Pitchers: 10 Kassidy Wilbur - Junior; 29 Reagan Chism - Sophomore; 30 Raigan Mock - Freshman; Outfielders: 1 Simone Medeiros - Freshman; 7 Madison Nguyen - Freshman; 14 Kayla Wallace - Freshman; 18 Lexi Benson - Freshman; 20 Taylor Trosclair - Junior; 21 Marisa Arriaga - Senior | Catchers: 2 Gaby Garcia - Sophomore; 8 Emily Land - Freshman; 23 Alex Dubose - Freshman; 27 Savanna Parker - Junior; Infielders: 3 Alex Hedspeth - Junior; 5 Cassidy Tucker - Junior; 6 Amzee Gerard - Sophomore; 9 Mackenzie Bennett - Junior; 11 Amanda Carden - Freshman; 12 Shaylon Govan - Sophomore; 15 Camryn Middlebrook - Sophomore; 28 Bryana Novegil - Senior; 32 Sydnee Hebert - Sophomore; 33 Bailey Richards - Senior |

=== Coaching staff ===
2021 Stephen F. Austin Ladyjacks coaching staff
- Nicole Dickson – Head Coach – 5th year
- Brynn Baca – Assistant Head Coach – 2nd year
- Morgan Spearman – Assistant Head Coach – 4th year
- Margarita Corona – Volunteer Assistant Coach

== Schedule and results ==
Legend
| | Stephen F. Austin win |
| | Stephen F. Austin loss |
| | Postponement/Cancellation |
| **Bold** | Stephen F. Austin team member |

2021 Stephen F. Austin Ladyjacks softball game log
Regular season (34-10)

February (1-7)
| Date | Opponent | Rank | Site/stadium | Score | Win | Loss | Save | TV | Attendance | Overall record | SLC record |
Aggie Classic
| Feb. 12 | vs. Utah Valley | | Davis Diamond • College Station, TX | Game cancelled due to threat of freezing rain/sleet/snow in College Station | | | | | | | |
| Feb. 12 | vs. Utah Valley | | Davis Diamond • College Station, TX | Game cancelled due to threat of freezing rain/sleet/snow in College Station | | | | | | | |
| Feb. 13 | at Texas A&M | | Davis Diamond • College Station, TX | Game cancelled due to threat of freezing rain/sleet/snow in College Station | | | | | | | |
| Feb. 13 | at Texas A&M | | Davis Diamond • College Station, TX | Game cancelled due to threat of freezing rain/sleet/snow in College Station | | | | | | | |
| Feb. 16 | Texas Southern | | SFA Softball Stadium • Nacogdoches, TX | Game postponed due to threat of freezing rain/sleet/snow in Beaumont | | | | | | | |
Alex Wilcox Memorial Tournament
| Feb. 21 | vs. Missouri State | | Nusz Park • Starkville, MS | **L** 0-7 | Dickerson (1-0) | **Wilbur** (0-1) | None | | 58 | 0-1 | |
| Feb. 21 | at No. 22 Mississippi State | | Nusz Park • Starkville, MS | **L** 2-4 | Willis (2-0) | **Govan** (0-1) | None | SECN+ | 250 | 0-2 | |
| Feb. 22 | vs. Missouri State | | Nusz Park • Starkville, MS | **L** 0-4 | Hunsaker (2-0) | **Wilbur** (0-2) | None | | 32 | 0-3 | |
| Feb. 22 | vs. Southern Illinois | | Nusz Park • Starkville, MS | **L** 4-5 | Clark (2-0) | **Govan** (0-2) | None | | 42 | 0-4 | |
| Feb. 24 | Texas Southern | | SFA Softball Field • Nacogdoches, TX | Game cancelled | | | | | | | |
| Feb. 24 | Texas Southern | | SFA Softball Field • Nacogdoches, TX | Game cancelled | | | | | | | |
North Texas Invitational
| Feb. 26 | at North Texas | | Lovelace Stadium • Denton, TX | **L** 1-9 | Trautwein (3-1) | **Govan** (0-3) | None | | 65 | 0-5 | |
| Feb. 26 | vs. Tarleton State | | Lovelace Stadium • Denton, TX | **W** 6-0 | **Wilbur** (1-2) | Erwin (0-2) | None | | 45 | 1-5 | |
| Feb. 27 | vs. Tarleton State | | Lovelace Stadium • Denton, TX | **L** 1-2 | Wernet (3-2) | **Wilbur** (1-3) | None | | 52 | 1-6 | |
| Feb. 27 | at North Texas | | Lovelace Stadium • Denton, TX | **L** 1-2 | Wall (3-2) | **Mock** (0-1) | Trautwein (1) | | 91 | 1-7 | |

March (17-1)
| Date | Opponent | Rank | Site/stadium | Score | Win | Loss | Save | TV | Attendance | Overall record | SLC record |
Adam Brown Memorial Shamrock Classic
| Mar. 5 | vs. Arkansas–Pine Bluff | | Farris Field • Conway, AR | **W** 10-0 (5 inns) | **Wilbur** (2-3) | Green (0-2) | None | | 37 | 2-7 | |
| Mar. 5 | vs. Western Michigan | | Farris Field • Conway, AR | **W** 2-1 | **Wilbur** (3-3) | Galloway (1-2) | None | | 42 | 3-7 | |
| Mar. 6 | vs. Mississippi Valley State | | Farris Field • Conway, AR | **W** 6-0 | **Wilbur** (4-3) | Matthews (0-4) | None | | 64 | 4-7 | |
| Mar. 6 | vs. Western Michigan | | Farris Field • Conway, AR | **W** 8-7 | **Wilbur** (4-3) | Stefanick (0-2) | None | | 56 | 5-7 | |
| Mar. 7 | vs. Western Michigan | | Farris Field • Conway, AR | **W** 6-2 | **Wilbur** (5-3) | Galloway (1-4) | None | | 45 | 6-7 | |
| Mar. 9 | Louisiana Tech | | SFA Softball Field • Nacogdoches, TX | **W** 4-0 | **Wilbur** (7-3) | Hutchinson (2-1) | None | | 153 | 7-7 | |
| Mar. 12 | at Incarnate Word | | H-E-B Field • San Antonio, TX | **W** 11-1 (5 inns) | **Wilbur** (8-3) | Floyd (0-1) | None | | 75 | 8-7 | 1-0 |
| Mar. 12 | at Incarnate Word | | H-E-B Field • San Antonio, TX | **W** 8-0 | **Wilbur** (9-3) | Myers (0-3) | None | | | 9-7 | 2-0 |
| Mar. 13 | at Incarnate Word | | H-E-B Field • San Antonio, TX | **W** 8-2 | **Wilbur** (10-3) | Trapp (0-2) | None | | 75 | 10-7 | 3-0 |
| Mar. 16 | at Baylor | | Getterman Stadium • Waco, TX | **L** 2-3 | Mansell (5-0) | **Mock** (0-2) | None | ESPN+ | 280 | 10-8 | |
| Mar. 19 | Nicholls | | SFA Softball Field • Nacogdoches, TX | **W** 6-0 | **Wilbur** (10-3) | Danehower (3-3) | None | | 236 | 11-8 | 4-0 |
| Mar. 19 | Nicholls | | SFA Softball Field • Nacogdoches, TX | **W** 12-2 (5 inns) | **Chism** (1-0) | Turner (0-1) | None | | 217 | 12-8 | 5-0 |
| Mar. 20 | Nicholls | | SFA Softball Field • Nacogdoches, TX | **W** 9-4 | **Wibur** (11-3) | Moon (1-4) | None | | 299 | 13-8 | 6-0 |
| Mar. 24 | UT Arlington | | SFA Softball Field • Nacogdoches, TX | **W** 2-0 | **Chism** (2-0) | Hines (1-8) | **Wilbur** (2) | | 132 | 14-8 | |
| Mar. 26 | Lamar | | SFA Softball Field • Nacogdoches, TX | **W** 10-1 (5 inns) | **Wilbur** (12-3) | Mixon (1-6) | None | | 150 | 15-8 | 7-0 |
| Mar. 26 | Lamar | | SFA Softball Field • Nacogdoches, TX | **W** 14-2 (5 inns) | **Chism** (3-0) | Reyna (0-8) | None | | 113 | 16-8 | 8-0 |
| Mar. 27 | Lamar | | SFA Softball Field • Nacogdoches, TX | **W** 9-1 (5 inns) | **Wilbur** (13-3) | Mixon (1-7) | None | | 85 | 17-8 | 9-0 |
| Mar. 30 | at Prairie View A&M | | Lady Panther Softball Field • Prairie View, TX | **W** 10-1 (5 inns) | **Wilbur** (14-3) | Salinas (1-1) | None | | 76 | 18-8 | |

April (13–1)
| Date | Opponent | Rank | Site/stadium | Score | Win | Loss | Save | TV | Attendance | Overall record | SLC record |
|---|---|---|---|---|---|---|---|---|---|---|---|
| Apr. 2 | at Abilene Christian | | Poly Wells Field • Abilene, TX | **W** 9-1 (6 inns) | **Wilbur** (15-3) | Bradley (3-12) | None | | 142 | 19-8 | 10-0 |
| Apr. 2 | at Abilene Christian | | Poly Wells Field • Abilene, TX | **W** 10-5 | **Wilbur** (16-3) | White (4-9) | None | | 142 | 20-8 | 11-0 |
| Apr. 3 | at Abilene Christian | | Poly Wells Field • Abilene, TX | **W** 8-0 (5 inns) | **Wilbur** (17-3) | Sinnott (0-2) | None | | 163 | 21-8 | 12-0 |
| Apr. 9 | at Texas A&M–Corpus Christi | | Chapman Field • Corpus Christi, TX | **W** 2-0 | **Wilbur** (18-3) | Lara (10-6) | None | | 137 | 22-8 | 13-0 |
| Apr. 9 | at Texas A&M–Corpus Christi | | Chapman Field • Corpus Christi, TX | **W** 6-1 | **Wilbur** (19-3) | McNeill (1-5) | None | | 137 | 23-8 | 14-0 |
| Apr. 10 | at Texas A&M–Corpus Christi | | Chapman Field • Corpus Christi, TX | **W** 7-2 | **Wilbur** (20-3) | Lara (10-7) | None | | 153 | 24-8 | 15-0 |
| Apr. 17 | Northwestern State | | SFA Softball Field • Nacogdoches, TX | **W** 2-0 | **Wilbur** (21-3) | Howell (5-6) | None | | 500 | 25-8 | 16-0 |
| Apr. 17 | Northwestern State | | SFA Softball Field • Nacogdoches, TX | **W** 9-5 | **Wilbur** (22-3) | Rhoden (4-4) | None | | 150 | 26-8 | 17-0 |
| Apr. 18 | Northwestern State | | SFA Softball Field • Nacogdoches, TX | **W** 6-0 | **Wilbur** (23-3) | Howell (5-7) | None | | 217 | 27-8 | 18-0 |
| Apr. 24 | at Central Arkansas | | Farris Field • Conway, AR | **W** 3-0 | **Wilbur** (24-3) | Johnson (9-7) | None | | 119 | 28-8 | 19-0 |
| Apr. 24 | at Central Arkansas | | Farris Field • Conway, AR | **L** 2-7 | Beaver (14-6) | **Chism** (3-1) | None | | 206 | 28-9 | 19-1 |
| Apr. 25 | at Central Arkansas | | Farris Field • Conway, AR | **W** 6-0 | **Wilbur** (25-3) | Sanchez (4-4) | None | | 136 | 29-9 | 20-1 |
| Apr. 30 | at Sam Houston State | | Bearkat Softball Complex • Huntsville, TX | **W** 3-0 | **Wilbur** (26-3) | Vento (7-7) | None | | 115 | 30-9 | 21-1 |
| Apr. 30 | at Sam Houston State | | Bearkat Softball Complex • Huntsville, TX | **W** 1-0 | **Wilbur** (27-3) | Dunn (6-10) | None | | 115 | 31-9 | 22-1 |

May (3-1)
| Date | Opponent | Rank | Site/stadium | Score | Win | Loss | Save | TV | Attendance | Overall record | SLC record |
|---|---|---|---|---|---|---|---|---|---|---|---|
| May 1 | at Sam Houston State | | Bearkat Softball Complex • Huntsville, TX | **W** 11-8 | **Wilbur** (28-3) | Dunn (6-11) | None | | 112 | 32-9 | 23-1 |
| May 7 | Houston Baptist | | SFA Softball Field • Nacogdoches, TX | **L** 1-3 | Patak (8-9) | **Wilbur** (28-4) | None | | 143 | 32-10 | 23-2 |
| May 7 | Houston Baptist | | SFA Softball Field • Nacogdoches, TX | **W** 5-4 | **Chism** (3-1) | Swanson (9-2) | **Wilbur** (3) | | 116 | 33-10 | 24-2 |
| May 8 | Houston Baptist | | SFA Softball Field • Nacogdoches, TX | **W** 1-0 | **Wilbur** (29-4) | Patak (8-10) | None | | 135 | 34-10 | 25-2 |

Post-Season (1-2)

Southland Tournament (1-2)
| Date | Opponent | (Seed)/Rank | Site/stadium | Score | Win | Loss | Save | TV | Attendance | Overall record | SLC record |
|---|---|---|---|---|---|---|---|---|---|---|---|
| May 13 | vs. (4) Northwestern State | (1) | North Oak Park • Hammond, LA | **W** 4-1 | **Wilbur** (30-4) | Howell (6-10) | None | ESPN+ | 335 | 35-10 | |
| May 14 | vs. (3) McNeese State | (1) | North Oak Park • Hammond, LA | **L** 1-4 | Tate (13-7) | **Wilbur** (30-5) | None | ESPN+ | 304 | 35-11 | |
| May 15 | vs. (2) Central Arkansas | (1) | North Oak Park • Hammond, LA | **L** 4-5 | Beaver (21-6) | **Wilbur** (30-6) | None | ESPN+ | 307 | 35-12 | |

Schedule source:

*Rankings are based on the team's current ranking in the NFCA/USA Softball poll.

== Postseason ==
=== Conference accolades ===
- Player of the Year: Kassidy Wilbur – SFA
- Hitter of the Year: Shaylon Govan – SFA
- Pitcher of the Year: Kassidy Wilbur – SFA
- Freshman of the Year: Jenna Wildeman – UCA
- Newcomer of the Year: Jenna Edwards – MCNS
- Coach of the Year: Nicole Dickson – SFA

All Conference First Team

- Shaylon Govan (SFA)
- Bryana Novegil (SFA)
- Haylee Brinlee (MCNS)
- Cori McCrary (MCNS)
- Heidi Jaquez (HBU)
- E. C. Delafield (NSU)
- Mackenzie Bennett (SFA)
- Jenna Wildeman (UCA)
- Megan McDonald (SHSU)
- Aeriyl Mass (SELA)
- Kayla Beaver (UCA)
- Kassidy Wilbur (SFA)

All Conference Second Team

- Kaylyn Shephard (UCA)
- Mary Kate Brown (UCA)
- Lindsey Rizzo (SELA)
- Camryn Middlebrook (SFA)
- Hannah Scheaffer (SHSU)
- Gaby Garcia (SFA)
- Kaylee Lopez (MCNS)
- Donelle Johnson (ACU)
- Jil Poullard (MCNS)
- Audrey Greely (SELA)
- Jordan Johnson (UCA)
- Whitney Tate (MCNS)

All Conference Third Team

- Caitlyn Brockway (HBU)
- Cayla Jones (NSU)
- Alex Hedspeth (SFA)
- Ashlyn Reavis (NICH)
- Chloe Gomez (MCNS)
- Jasie Roberts (HBU)
- Anna Rodenberg (SELA)
- Kaitlyn St. Clair (NSU)
- Sheridan Fisher (SHSU)
- Pal Egan (TAMUCC)
- Lyndie Swanson (HBU)
- Heather Zumo (SELA)
