= 2021 Sam Houston State Bearkats softball team =

American college softball season

2021 Sam Houston State Bearkats softball
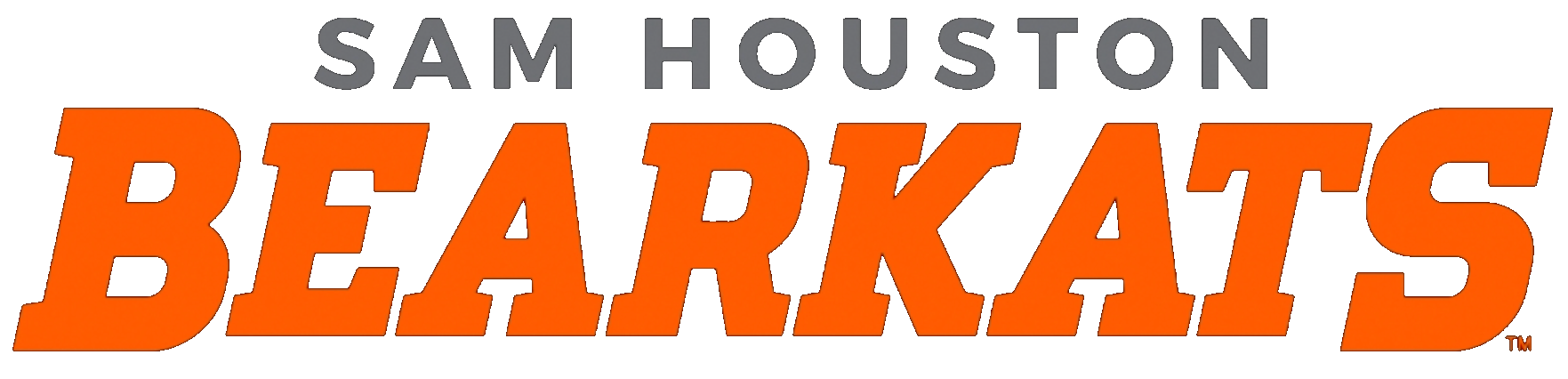
- Conference: Southland Conference
- Record: 19–31 (14–13 Southland)
- Head coach: Garrett Valis (3rd season)
- Assistant coaches: Tori Rivera; Tess Soefje
- Home stadium: Bearkat Softball Complex

2021 Southland Conference softball standings
	Conf.				Overall
Team	W		L	PCT	W		L	PCT
Stephen F. Austin ‍†‍‍	25	–	2	.926	35	–	12	.745
Central Arkansas ‍‍‍	21	–	6	.778	37	–	19	.661
McNeese State ‍‍‡‍^{y}	18	–	9	.667	35	–	26	.574
Northwestern State ‍‍‍	16	–	11	.593	24	–	22	.522
Southeastern Louisiana ‍‍‍	14	–	10	.583	28	–	23	.549
Houston Baptist ‍‍‍	15	–	12	.556	22	–	17	.564
Sam Houston State ‍‍‍	14	–	13	.519	19	–	31	.380
Abilene Christian ‍‍‍	10	–	17	.370	14	–	33	.298
Incarnate Word ‍‍‍	9	–	18	.333	16	–	27	.372
Texas A&M–Corpus Christi ‍‍‍	8	–	16	.333	18	–	30	.375
Nicholls ‍‍‍	5	–	22	.185	12	–	28	.300
Lamar ‍‍‍	4	–	23	.148	8	–	43	.157
† – Conference champion ‡ – Tournament champion y – Invited to the NCAA tournament As of May 22, 2021; Rankings from NFCA

The 2021 Sam Houston State Bearkats softball team represented Sam Houston State University during the 2021 NCAA Division I softball season. The Bearkats played their home games at Bearkat Softball Complex and were led by third-year head coach Garrett Valis. They were members of the Southland Conference.

== Preseason ==
=== Southland Conference Coaches Poll ===
The Southland Conference Coaches Poll was released on February 5, 2021. Sam Houston State was picked to finish fourth in the Southland Conference with 172 votes and one first place vote.

Coaches poll
Predicted finish	Team	Votes (1st place)
1	Stephen F. Austin	235 (17)
2	McNeese State	217 (4)
3	Southeastern Louisiana	183
4	Sam Houston State	172 (1)
5	Central Arkansas	162 (1)
6	Northwestern State	156 (1)
7	Nicholls	131
8	Lamar	86
9	Abilene Christian	82
10	Houston Baptist	81
11	Texas A&M–Corpus Christi	47
12	Incarnate Word	32

=== Preseason All-Southland team ===
==== First team ====
- Kaylyn Shephard (UCA, R-SR, 1st Base)
- Cayla Joens (NSU, JR, 2nd Base)
- Cylla Hall (UCA, R-SR, 3rd Base)
- Cori McCrary (MCNS, SR, Shortstop)
- Ella Manzer (SELA, SR, Catcher)
- Samantha Bradley (ACU, R-SR, Designated Player)
- Linsey Tomlinson (ACU, R-SR, Outfielder)
- Kaylee Lopez (MCNS, SO, Outfielder)
- Elise Vincent (NSU, SR, Outfielder)
- Madisen Blackford (SELA, SR, Outfielder)
- Megan McDonald (SHSU, SR, Outfielder)
- Kayla Beaver (UCA, R-FR, Pitcher)
- Kassidy Wilbur (SFA, JR, Pitcher)
- E. C. Delafield (NSU, JR, Utility)

==== Second team ====
- Shaylon Govan (SFA, SO, 1st Base)
- Brooke Malia (SHSU, SR, 2nd Base)
- Bryana Novegil (SFA, SR, 2nd Base)
- Caitlin Garcia (NICH, JR, 3rd Base)
- Alex Hudspeth (SFA, JR, Shortstop)
- Alexis Perry (NSU, SO, Catcher)
- Bailey Richards (SFA, SR, Catcher)
- Caitlyn Brockway (HBU, SO, Designated Player)
- Reagan Sperling (UCA, R-JR, Outfielder)
- Alayis Seneca (MCNS, SO, Outfielder)
- Hayley Barbazon (NSU, SR, Outfielder)
- Saleen Flores (MCNS, SO, Pitcher)
- MC Comeaux (SELA, FR, Pitcher)
- Sammi Thomas (TAMUCC, SO, Utility)

=== National Softball Signing Day ===
Player	Position	Hometown	Previous Team
Allison Saville	Infielder	Spring, Texas	Klein Oak HS
Brailey Wasik	Pitcher/Infielder	Burleson, Texas	Burleson HS
Jordan Peno	Outfielder/Catcher	Cypress, Texas	Cypress Creek HS
Brodie Quinlan	Infielder/Outfielder	Cypress, Texas	Bridgeland HS
Haleigh Carter	Infielder/Outfielder	Manvel, Texas	Shadow Creek HS
Kelsey Bunch	Catcher	League City, Texas	Clear Creek HS
Tricia Yarotsky	Infielder	Friendswood, Texas	Friendswood HS

== Roster ==
2021 Sam Houston State Bearkats roster
Pitchers: 1 Regan Dunn – Sophomore; 2 Taylor Bachmeyer – Freshman; 10 Mika Vento – Freshman; 24 Darby Fitzpatrick – Senior; 25 Christine Billmeier – Freshman; Outfielders: 8 Brooklyn Devine – Redshirt Senior; 13 Kayte Martinez – Senior; 16 Megan McDonald – Senior; 22 Sheridan Fisher – Junior	Catchers: 7 Lauren Whitney – Freshman; 15 Hannah Scheaffer – Freshman; Infielders: 4 Ellie Grill – Freshman; 5 Kyndal Kutac – Sophomore; 9 Kylie Hobbs – Freshman; 11 Emily Telg – Freshman; 14 Brooke Malia – Senior; 21 Kenzi Lange – Freshman; Utilities: 3 Madison Dillon – Freshman; 12 Courtney White – Freshman; 18 Caitlyn Goodeaux – Freshman; 42 Avery Tumey – Freshman

=== Coaching staff ===
2021 Sam Houston State Bearkats coaching staff
- Garrett Valis – Head Coach – 3rd year
- Tori Rivera – Assistant Head Coach – 3rd year
- Tess Soefje – Assistant Head Coach – 2nd year
- Bob Biles – Director of Softball Operations

== Schedule and results ==
Legend
	Sam Houston State win
	Sam Houston State loss
	Postponement/Cancellation
**Bold**	Sam Houston State team member

2021 Sam Houston State Bearkats softball game log
Regular season (18-29)

February (2-4)
Date	Opponent	Rank	Site/stadium	Score	Win	Loss	Save	TV	Attendance	Overall record	SLC record
Texas Classic
Feb. 12	vs. Colorado State		Red and Charline McCombs Field • Austin, TX	Game Cancelled due to threat of freezing rain/sleet/snow in Austin							
Feb. 12	vs. No. 3 Arizona		Red and Charline McCombs Field • Austin, TX	Game Cancelled due to threat of freezing rain/sleet/snow in Austin							
Feb. 13	vs. Colorado State		Red and Charline McCombs Field • Austin, TX	Game Cancelled due to threat of freezing rain/sleet/snow in Austin							
Feb. 13	vs. No. 3 Arizona		Red and Charline McCombs Field • Austin, TX	Game Cancelled due to threat of freezing rain/sleet/snow in Austin							
Feb. 14	vs. No. 6 Texas		Red and Charline McCombs Field • Austin, TX	Game Cancelled due to threat of freezing rain/sleet/snow in Austin							
Bearkat Classic
Feb. 20	No. 3 Oklahoma		Bearkat Softball Complex • Huntsville, TX	Game Cancelled due to threat of freezing rain/sleet/snow in Huntsville							
Feb. 20	Louisiana–Monroe		Bearkat Softball Complex • Huntsville, TX	Game Cancelled due to threat of freezing rain/sleet/snow in Huntsville							
Feb. 21	UTSA		Bearkat Softball Complex • Huntsville, TX	Game Cancelled due to threat of freezing rain/sleet/snow in Huntsville							
Feb. 21	Louisiana–Monroe		Bearkat Softball Complex • Huntsville, TX	Game Cancelled due to threat of freezing rain/sleet/snow in Huntsville							
Feb. 24	Houston		Bearkat Softball Complex • Huntsville, TX	**W** 2-1	**Vento** (1-0)	Hertenberger (1-2)	None	ESPN+	104	1-0	
Feb. 24	Houston		Bearkat Softball Complex • Huntsville, TX	**L** 3-16	Hudson (2-0)	**Bachmeyer** (0-1)	None	ESPN+	105	1-1	
Lone Star State Invitational
Feb. 26	at No. 7 Texas		Red and Charline McCombs Field • Austin, TX	**L** 3-9	White (1-0)	**Bachmeyer** (0-2)	Day (1)	LHN		1-2	
Feb. 26	vs. Lamar		Red and Charline McCombs Field • Austin, TX	**W** 12-6	**Dunn** (1-0)	Mixon (1-3)	None	LHN		2-2	
Feb. 27	vs. Ole Miss		Red and Charline McCombs Field • Austin, TX	**L** 0-12 (5 inns)	Tillmann (2-1)	**Vento** (2-0)	None			2-3	
Feb. 27	vs. Texas State		Red and Charline McCombs Field • Austin, TX	**L** 3-10	McCann (2-0)	**Bachmeyer** (0-3)	None		313	2-4	

March (5-14)
Date	Opponent	Rank	Site/stadium	Score	Win	Loss	Save	TV	Attendance	Overall record	SLC record
Mar. 3	Texas A&M		Bearkat Softball Complex • Huntsville, TX	**L** 5-11	Poynter (2-0)	**Dunn** (1-1)	None		106	2-5	
Courtyard Marriott Tournament
Mar. 5	at No. 1 Oklahoma		OU Softball Complex • Norman, OK	**L** 0-7	May (5-0)	**Billmeier** (0-1)	None	SoonerSports.TV	184	2-6	
Mar. 6	vs. No. 18 Missouri		OU Softball Complex • Norman, OK	**L** 0-10 (5 inns)	Dandola (1-0)	**Bachmeyer** (1-2)	None		100	2-7	
Mar. 6	vs. Louisiana–Monroe		OU Softball Complex • Norman, OK	**W** 5-3	**Vento** (2-1)	Williams (0-1)	None		50	3-7	
Mar. 7	vs. Louisiana–Monroe		OU Softball Complex • Norman, OK	**L** 6-8	Hulett (2-2)	**Dunn** (1-2)	None		100	3-8	
Mar. 7	at No. 1 Oklahoma		OU Softball Complex • Norman, OK	**L** 0-17 (5 inns)	Thiede (1-0)	**Fitzpatrick** (0-2)	None		200	3-9	
Mar. 10	vs. BYU		Bobcat Softball Stadium • San Marcos, TX	**L** 2-12	Paulson (3-2)	**Dunn** (2-2)	None		272	3-10	
Mar. 10	at RV Texas State		Bobcat Softball Stadium • San Marcos, TX	**L** 0-6	Mullins (4-2)	**Billmeier** (0-2)	None		272	3-11	
Mar. 12	at Texas A&M–Corpus Christi		Chapman Field • Corpus Christ, TX	**L** 2-4	Lara (5-1)	**Vento** (2-2)	None		134	3-12	0-1
Mar. 12	at Texas A&M–Corpus Christi		Chapman Field • Corpus Christi, TX	**W** 6-0	**Dunn** (2-3)	Lombrana (2-6)	None		224	4-12	1-1
Mar. 13	at Texas A&M–Corpus Christi		Chapman Field • Corpus Christ, TX	**L** 0-5	Lara (6-1)	**Billmeier** (0-3)	None		204	4-13	1-2
Mar. 19	McNeese State		Bearkat Softball Complex • Huntsville, TX	**W** 6-1	**Dunn** (3-3)	Vallejo (1-5)	None		109	5-13	2-2
Mar. 20	McNeese State		Bearkat Softball Complex • Huntsville, TX	**W** 6-0	**Vento** (3-2)	Tate (3-7)	None		107	6-13	3-2
Mar. 20	McNeese State		Bearkat Softball Complex • Huntsville, TX	**W** 4-0	**Dunn** (4-3)	Flores (4-5)	None		115	7-13	4-2
Mar. 23	RV Baylor		Bearkat Softball Complex • Huntsville, TX	**L** 3-7	Rodoni (5-4)	**Bachmeyer** (0-5)	None	ESPN+	115	7-14	
Mar. 26	at Central Arkansas		Farris Field • Conway, AR	**L** 1-11 (5 inns)	Beaver (9-3)	**Dunn** (4-4)	None		218	7-15	4-3
Mar. 26	at Central Arkansas		Farris Field • Conway, AR	**L** 0-1	Johnson (5-4)	**Vento** (3-3)	None		250	7-16	4-4
Mar. 27	at Central Arkansas		Farris Field • Conway, AR	**L** 1-5	Johnson (6-4)	**Vento** (3-4)	None		202	7-17	4-5
Mar. 31	UT Arlington		Bearkat Softball Complex • Huntsville, TX	**L** 1-8	Henriksen (1-2)	**Billmeier** (1-3)	None	ESPN+	109	7-18	

April (8–10)
Date	Opponent	Rank	Site/stadium	Score	Win	Loss	Save	TV	Attendance	Overall record	SLC record
Apr. 2	Houston Baptist		Bearkat Softball Complex • Huntsville, TX	**L** 8-0 (6 inns)	Patak (4-7)	**Dunn** (4-5)	None		109	7-19	4-6
Apr. 2	Houston Baptist		Bearkat Softball Complex • Huntsville, TX	**L** 2-0	Swanson (3-0)	**Vento** (3-5)	None		109	7-20	4-7
Apr. 3	Houston Baptist		Bearkat Softball Complex • Huntsville, TX	**W** 4-1	**Bachmeyer** (1-1)	Janes (0-2)	**Vento** (1)		111	8-20	5-7
Apr. 6	No. 14 Louisiana		Bearkat Softball Complex • Huntsville, TX	**L** 3-8	Ellyson (10-4)	**Dunn** (4-6)	None		107	8-21	
Apr. 9	at Abilene Christian		Poly Wells Field • Abilene, TX	**W** 13-10	**Vento** (4-4)	Bradley (3-13)	None		117	9-21	6-7
Apr. 9	at Abilene Christian		Poly Wells Field • Abilene, TX	**W** 9-3	**Dunn** (5-6)	White (4-10)	None		117	10-21	7-7
Apr. 10	at Abilene Christian		Poly Wells Field • Abilene, TX	**W** 9-5	**Vento** (5-5)	Harris (0-2)	None		94	11-21	8-7
Apr. 14	at RV Texas A&M		Davis Diamond • College Station, TX	**L** 0-8 (6 inns)	Herzog (10-2)	**Billmeier** (0-5)	None	SECN+	329	11-22	
Apr. 17	Southeastern Louisiana		Bearkat Softball Complex • Huntsville, TX	**L** 0-13	Zumo (14-2)	**Dunn** (5-7)	None	ESPN+	115	11-23	8-8
Apr. 17	Southeastern Louisiana		Bearkat Softball Complex • Huntsville, TX	**W** 8-0	**Vento** (6-5)	Hannabas (2-4)	None	ESPN+	115	12-23	9-8
Apr. 18	Southeastern Louisiana		Bearkat Softball Complex • Huntsville, TX	**W** 4-2	**Vento** (7-5)	Zumo (14-3)	None		115	13-23	10-8
Apr. 21	at Baylor		Getterman Stadium • Waco, TX	**L** 0-8 (5 inns)	Mansell (7-3)	**Dunn** (5-8)	None	ESPN+	308	13-24	
Apr. 24	at Northwestern State		Lady Demon Diamond • Natchitoches, LA	**L** 3-4 (9 inns)	Howell (6-7)	**Vento** (7-5)	None		150	13-25	10-9
Apr. 24	at Northwestern State		Lady Demon Diamond • Natchitoches, LA	**L** 4-6	Delafield (8-2)	**Dunn** (5-9)	None		200	13-26	10-10
Apr. 25	at Northwestern State		Lady Demon Diamond • Natchitoches, LA	**W** 6-1	**Billmeier** (1-5)	Howell (6-8)	**Vento** (2)		175	14-26	11-10
Apr. 28	Tarleton State		Bearkat Softball Complex • Huntsville, TX	**W** 3-1	**Dunn** (6-9)	Bridges (10-18)	None		72	15-26	
Apr. 30	Stephen F. Austin		Bearkat Softball Complex • Huntsville, TX	**L** 0-3	Wilbur (26-3)	**Vento** (7-7)	None		115	15-27	11-11
Apr. 30	Stephen F. Austin		Bearkat Softball Complex • Huntsville, TX	**L** 0-1 (9 inns)	Wilbur (27-3)	**Dunn** (6-10)	None	ESPN+	115	15-28	11-12

May (3-1)
Date	Opponent	Rank	Site/stadium	Score	Win	Loss	Save	TV	Attendance	Overall record	SLC record
May 1	Stephen F. Austin		Bearkat Softball Complex • Huntsville, TX	**L** 8-11 (8 inns)	Wilbur (28-3)	**Dunn** (6-11)	None	ESPN+	112	15-29	11-13
May 7	Incarnate Word		Bearkat Softball Complex • Huntsville, TX	**W** 4-0	**Dunn** (7-11)	Trapp (6-8)	None		116	16-29	12-13
May 7	Incarnate Word		Bearkat Softball Complex • Huntsville, TX	**W** 4-0	**Bachmeyer** (2-5)	Gunther (7-10)	None		116	17-29	13-13
May 8	Incarnate Word		Bearkat Softball Complex • Huntsville, TX	**W** 9-1 (6 inns)	**Vento** (8-7)	Trapp (6-9)	None		135	18-29	14-13

Post-Season (1-3)

Southland Tournament (1-3)
Date	Opponent	(Seed)/Rank	Site/stadium	Score	Win	Loss	Save	TV	Attendance	Overall record	Tournament record
May 12	vs. (6) Houston Baptist	(7)	North Oak Park • Hammond, LA	**W** 4-3	**Dunn** (8-11)	Swanson (9-3)	None	ESPN+	172	19-29	1-0
May 13	vs. (3) McNeese State	(7)	North Oak Park • Hammond, LA	**L** 1-3	Edwards (8-2)	**Vento** (8-8)	None	ESPN+	277	19-30	1-1
May 14	vs. (4) Northwestern State	(7)	North Oak Park • Hammond, LA	**L** 0-8 (5 inns)	Delafield (12-4)	**Dunn** (8-12)	None	ESPN+	319	19-31	1-2

Schedule source:

*Rankings are based on the team's current ranking in the NFCA/USA Softball poll.

== Postseason ==
=== Conference Accolades ===
- Player of the Year: Kassidy Wilbur – SFA
- Hitter of the Year: Shaylon Govan – SFA
- Pitcher of the Year: Kassidy Wilbur – SFA
- Freshman of the Year: Jenna Wildeman – UCA
- Newcomer of the Year: Jenna Edwards – MCNS
- Coach of the Year: Nicole Dickson – SFA

All Conference First Team

- Shaylon Govan (SFA)
- Bryana Novegil (SFA)
- Haylee Brinlee (MCNS)
- Cori McCrary (MCNS)
- Heidi Jaquez (HBU)
- E. C. Delafield (NSU)
- Mackenzie Bennett (SFA)
- Jenna Wildeman (UCA)
- Megan McDonald (SHSU)
- Aeriyl Mass (SELA)
- Kayla Beaver (UCA)
- Kassidy Wilbur (SFA)

All Conference Second Team

- Kaylyn Shephard (UCA)
- Mary Kate Brown (UCA)
- Lindsey Rizzo (SELA)
- Camryn Middlebrook (SFA)
- Hannah Scheaffer (SHSU)
- Gaby Garcia (SFA)
- Kaylee Lopez (MCNS)
- Donelle Johnson (ACU)
- Jil Poullard (MCNS)
- Audrey Greely (SELA)
- Jordan Johnson (UCA)
- Whitney Tate (MCNS)

All Conference Third Team

- Caitlyn Brockway (HBU)
- Cayla Jones (NSU)
- Alex Hedspeth (SFA)
- Ashlyn Reavis (NICH)
- Chloe Gomez (MCNS)
- Jasie Roberts (HBU)
- Anna Rodenberg (SELA)
- Kaitlyn St. Clair (NSU)
- Sheridan Fisher (SHSU)
- Pal Egan (TAMUCC)
- Lyndie Swanson (HBU)
- Heather Zumo (SELA)
