= 2021 Northwestern State Lady Demons softball team =

American college softball season

2021 Northwestern State Lady Demons softball
- Conference: Southland Conference
- Record: 24–22 (16–11 Southland)
- Head coach: Donald Pickett (13th season)
- Assistant coaches: Amanda Locke; Brooke Boening
- Home stadium: Lady Demon Diamond

2021 Southland Conference softball standings
	Conf.				Overall
Team	W		L	PCT	W		L	PCT
Stephen F. Austin ‍†‍‍	25	–	2	.926	35	–	12	.745
Central Arkansas ‍‍‍	21	–	6	.778	37	–	19	.661
McNeese State ‍‍‡‍^{y}	18	–	9	.667	35	–	26	.574
Northwestern State ‍‍‍	16	–	11	.593	24	–	22	.522
Southeastern Louisiana ‍‍‍	14	–	10	.583	28	–	23	.549
Houston Baptist ‍‍‍	15	–	12	.556	22	–	17	.564
Sam Houston State ‍‍‍	14	–	13	.519	19	–	31	.380
Abilene Christian ‍‍‍	10	–	17	.370	14	–	33	.298
Incarnate Word ‍‍‍	9	–	18	.333	16	–	27	.372
Texas A&M–Corpus Christi ‍‍‍	8	–	16	.333	18	–	30	.375
Nicholls ‍‍‍	5	–	22	.185	12	–	28	.300
Lamar ‍‍‍	4	–	23	.148	8	–	43	.157
† – Conference champion ‡ – Tournament champion y – Invited to the NCAA tournament As of May 22, 2021; Rankings from NFCA

The 2021 Northwestern State Lady Demons softball team represented Northwestern State University during the 2021 NCAA Division I softball season. The Lady Demons played their home games at Lady Demon Diamond and were led by thirteenth year head coach Donald Pickett. They were members of the Southland Conference.

== Preseason ==
=== Southland Conference Coaches Poll ===
The Southland Conference Coaches Poll was released on February 5, 2021. Northwestern State was picked to finish sixth in the Southland Conference with 156 votes and 1 first place vote.

Coaches poll
Predicted finish	Team	Votes (1st place)
1	Stephen F. Austin	235 (17)
2	McNeese State	217 (4)
3	Southeastern Louisiana	183
4	Sam Houston State	172 (1)
5	Central Arkansas	162 (1)
6	Northwestern State	156 (1)
7	Nicholls	131
8	Lamar	86
9	Abilene Christian	82
10	Houston Baptist	81
11	Texas A&M–Corpus Christi	47
12	Incarnate Word	32

=== Preseason All-Southland team ===
==== First Team ====
- Kaylyn Shephard (UCA, R-SR, 1st Base)
- Cayla Joens (NSU, JR, 2nd Base)
- Cylla Hall (UCA, R-SR, 3rd Base)
- Cori McCrary (MCNS, SR, Shortstop)
- Ella Manzer (SELA, SR, Catcher)
- Samantha Bradley (ACU, R-SR, Designated Player)
- Linsey Tomlinson (ACU, R-SR, Outfielder)
- Kaylee Lopez (MCNS, SO, Outfielder)
- Elise Vincent (NSU, SR, Outfielder)
- Madisen Blackford (SELA, SR, Outfielder)
- Megan McDonald (SHSU, SR, Outfielder)
- Kayla Beaver (UCA, R-FR, Pitcher)
- Kassidy Wilbur (SFA, JR, Pitcher)
- E. C. Delafield (NSU, JR, Utility)

==== Second Team ====
- Shaylon Govan (SFA, SO, 1st Base)
- Brooke Malia (SHSU, SR, 2nd Base)
- Bryana Novegil (SFA, SR, 2nd Base)
- Caitlin Garcia (NICH, JR, 3rd Base)
- Alex Hudspeth (SFA, JR, Shortstop)
- Alexis Perry (NSU, SO, Catcher)
- Bailey Richards (SFA, SR, Catcher)
- Caitlyn Brockway (HBU, SO, Designated Player)
- Reagan Sperling (UCA, R-JR, Outfielder)
- Alayis Seneca (MCNS, SO, Outfielder)
- Hayley Barbazon (NSU, SR, Outfielder)
- Saleen Flores (MCNS, SO, Pitcher)
- MC Comeaux (SELA, FR, Pitcher)
- Sammi Thomas (TAMUCC, SO, Utility)

=== National Softball Signing Day ===
Player	Position	Hometown	Previous Team
Sage Hoover	Pitcher	Edgewood, Texas	Rains HS
Adriana Vences	Pitcher	Marshall, Texas	Marshall HS
Haley Parker	Pitcher	Fort Worth, Texas	Bosewell HS
Derika Castillo	Utility	Houston, Texas	Summer Creek HS
Bailie Ragsdale	Utility	Lone Oak, Texas	Lone Oak HS
Vivica Hernandez	Outfielder	Fort Worth, Texas	V. R. Eaton HS
Carson Zachry	Infielder	Mount Pleasant, Texas	Mount Pleasant HS

== Roster ==
2021 Northwestern State Lady Demons roster
Pitchers: 5 Jensen Howell - Junior; 7 Bronte Rhoden - Sophomore; 11 Kenzie Seely - Freshman; 15 Emma Callie Delafield - Junior; 18 Heather Zook - Freshman; 28 Maggie Darr - Freshman; Outfielders: 1 Hayley Barbazon - Senior; 6 Makenzie Chaffin - Freshman; 9 Kaitlyn St. Clair - Senior; 21 Elise Vincent - Senior; 23 Laney Roos - Freshman; 32 Nani Winger - Freshman; 44 Casey Irvin - Sophomore	Catchers: 17 Kat Marshall - Freshman; 33 Lexie Roos - Freshman; 42 Alexis Perry - Sophomore; Infielders: 2 Cayla Jones - Junior; 4 Maggie Black - Sophomore; 8 Emma Hawthorne - Senior; 22 Chelsea Spain - Freshman; 40 Alexis Szafran - Freshman; Utilities: 12 Taylor Williams - Freshman; 14 Keely DuBois - Freshman; 24 Kacee Mertens - Freshman; 47 Marissa Reed - Sophomore

=== Coaching staff ===
2021 Northwestern State Lady Demons coaching staff
- Donald Pickett – Head Coach – 12th year
- Amanda Locke – Assistant Head Coach – 5th year
- Brooke Boening – Assistant Head Coach – 3rd year

== Schedule and results ==
Legend
	Northwestern State win
	Northwestern State loss
	Postponement/Cancellation
**Bold**	Northwestern State team member

2021 Northwestern State Lady Demons softball game log
Regular season (22-20)

February (5-2)
Date	Opponent	Rank	Site/stadium	Score	Win	Loss	Save	TV	Attendance	Overall record	SLC Record
Natchitoches Historic District Development Commission Lady Demon Classic
Feb. 12	Arkansas–Pine Bluff		Parc Natchitoches • Natchitoches, LA	Game cancelled due to threat of freezing rain/sleet/snow in Natchitoches							
Feb. 12	UT Martin		Parc Natchitoches • Natchitoches, LA	Game cancelled due to threat of freezing rain/sleet/snow in Natchitoches							
Feb. 13	Evansville		Lady Demon Diamond • Natchitoches, LA	Game cancelled due to threat of freezing rain/sleet/snow in Natchitoches							
Feb. 13	Arkansas–Pine Bluff		Lady Demon Diamond • Natchitoches, LA	Game cancelled due to threat of freezing rain/sleet/snow in Natchitoches							
Feb. 14	Evansville		Lady Demon Diamond • Natchitoches, LA	Game cancelled due to threat of freezing rain/sleet/snow in Natchitoches							
Feb. 14	Arkansas–Pine Bluff		Lady Demon Diamond • Natchitoches, LA	Game cancelled due to threat of freezing rain/sleet/snow in Natchitoches							
Getterman Classic
Feb. 19	vs. Prairie View A&M		Getterman Stadium • Waco, TX	Game cancelled due to threat of freezing rain/sleet/snow in Waco							
Feb. 19	at No. 23 Baylor		Getterman Stadium • Waco, TX	Game cancelled due to threat of freezing rain/sleet/snow in Waco							
Feb. 20	vs. No. 21 Missouri		Getterman Stadium • Waco, TX	Game cancelled due to threat of freezing rain/sleet/snow in Waco							
Feb. 21	at Louisiana–Monroe		Geo-Surfaces Field at the ULM Softball Complex • Monroe, LA	Game postponed due to threat of ice on field in Monroe.							
Feb. 24	at Louisiana–Monroe		Geo-Surfaces Field at the ULM Softball Complex • Monroe, LA	Game postponed due to threat of ice on field in Monroe							
Feb. 23	Grambling State		Lady Demon Diamond • Natchitoches, LA	**W** 10-0 (5 inns)	**Rhoden** (1-0)	Bonner (0-1)	None		101	1-0	
Feb. 23	Grambling State		Lady Demon Diamond • Natchitoches, LA	**W** 9-1 (5 inns)	**Howell** (1-0)	Shells (0-1)	None		135	2-0	
South Alabama Invitational
Feb. 26	vs. SIU Edwardsville		Jaguar Field • Mobile, AL	**W** 3-0 (8 inns)	**Howell** (2-0)	Ingles (0-1)	None		200	3-0	
Feb. 27	vs. Middle Tennessee		Jaguar Field • Mobile, AL	**W** 2-0	**Delafield** (1-0)	Mead (0-1)	**Rhoden** (1)		200	4-0	
Feb. 27	vs. No. 20 Missouri		Jaguar Field • Mobile, AL	**L** 0-8 (5 inns)	Weber (4-0)	**Howell** (2-1)	None		200	4-1	
Feb. 28	vs. SIU Edwardsville		Jaguar Field • Mobile, AL	**W** 6-5 (8 inns)	**Guile** (1-0)	Ingles (0-3)	None		200	5-1	
Feb. 28	at South Alabama		Jaguar Field • Mobile, AL	**L** 1-6	Lackie (5-2)	**Seely** (0-1)	None	ESPN+	200	5-2	

March (10-6)
Date	Opponent	Rank	Site/stadium	Score	Win	Loss	Save	TV	Attendance	Overall record	SLC Record
Mar. 3	Louisiana–Monroe		Lady Demon Diamond • Natchitoches, LA	**W** 3-1	**Howell** (2-1)	Hulett (1-2)	None		282	6-2	
Wooo Pig Classic
Mar. 5	vs. Drake		Bogle Park • Fayetteville, AR	**L** 2-12 (5 inns)	Hupke (1-0)	**Howell** (3-2)	None		448	6-3	
Mar. 5	at No. 20 Arkansas		Bogle Park • Fayetteville, AR	**L** 5-13 (6 inns)	Howell (2-0)	**Rhoden** (1-1)	None	SECN+	578	6-4	
Mar. 6	vs. Kansas		Bogle Park • Fayetteville, AR	**L** 0-5	Reed (4-2)	**Dealfield** (1-1)	None		480	6-5	
Mar. 6	at No. 20 Arkansas		Bogle Park • Fayetteville, AR	**L** 2-13 (5 inns)	Haff (9-1)	**Howell** (3-3)	None		590	6-6	
Mar. 7	vs. Kansas		Bogle Park • Fayetteville, AR	**L** 2-6	Mills (1-0)	**Rhoden** (1-2)	None		269	6-7	
Mar. 12	at Nicholls		Swanner Field at Geo Surfaces Park • Thibodaux, LA	**W** 8-3	**Rhoden** (2-2)	Danehower (3-2)	None		123	7-7	1-0
Mar. 12	at Nicholls		Swanner Field at Geo Surfaces Park • Thibodaux, LA	**W** 10-1 (5 inns)	**Howell** (4-3)	Moon (1-3)	None		123	8-7	2-0
Mar. 13	at Nicholls		Swanner Field at Geo Surfaces Park • Thibodaux, LA	**W** 4-0	**Delafield** (2-1)	LaBure (2-3)	None		101	9-7	3-0
Mar. 19	at Incarnate Word		H-E-B Field • San Antonio, TX	**W** 5-2	**Rhoden** (3-2)	Gunther (1-4)	None		75	10-7	4-0
Mar. 19	at Incarnate Word		H-E-B Field • San Antonio, TX	**W** 17-0 (5 inns)	**Delafield** (3-1)	Trapp (0-3)	None		75	11-7	5-0
Mar. 20	at Incarnate Word		H-E-B Field • San Antonio, TX	**W** 5-0	**Delafield** (4-1)	Gunther (1-5)	None		75	12-7	6-0
Mar. 26	Houston Baptist		Lady Demon Diamond • Natchitoches, LA	**W** 2-1	**Howell** (5-3)	Patak (3-6)	None		300	13-7	7-0
Mar. 26	Houston Baptist		Lady Demon Diamond • Natchitoches, LA	**W** 5-1	**Delafield** (5-1)	Venker (2-1)	None		300	14-7	8-0
Mar. 27	Houston Baptist		Lady Demon Diamond • Natchitoches, LA	**W** 7-2	**Rhoden** (4-2)	Patak (3-7)	None		200	15-7	9-0
Mar. 30	at Louisiana Tech		Lady Techster Softball Complex • Ruston, LA	**L** 0-3	Pickett (3-5)	**Seely** (0-2)	Hernandez (1)		250	15-8	

April (5–10)
Date	Opponent	Rank	Site/stadium	Score	Win	Loss	Save	TV	Attendance	Overall record	SLC Record
Apr. 2	Central Arkansas		Lady Demon Diamond • Natchitoches, LA	**L** 1-3	Johnson (7-4)	**Howell** (5-4)	None		250	15-9	9-1
Apr. 2	Central Arkansas		Lady Demon Diamond • Natchitoches, LA	**L** 0-4	Beaver (10-3)	**Delafield** (5-2)	None		250	15-10	9-2
Apr. 3	Central Arkansas		Lady Demon Diamond • Natchitoches, LA	**L** 3-4	Beaver (11-3)	**Rhoden** (4-3)	Johnson (1)		203	15-11	9-3
Apr. 9	at Lamar		Lamar Softball Complex • Beaumont, TX	**L** 1-3	Mixon (2-10)	**Howell** (5-5)	None		119	15-12	9-4
Apr. 9	at Lamar		Lamar Softball Complex • Beaumont, TX	**W** 15-2	**Delafield** (6-2)	Reyna (1-11)	None		119	16-12	10-4
Apr. 10	at Lamar		Lamar Softball Complex • Beaumont, TX	**W** 5-4	**Delafield** (7-2)	Mixon (2-11)	**Rhoden** (2)		119	17-12	11-4
Apr. 13	at Grambling State		GSU Softball Complex • Grambling, LA	Game Postponed							
Apr. 17	at Stephen F. Austin		SFA Softball Field • Nacogdoches, TX	**L** 0-2	Wilbur (21-3)	**Howell** (5-6)	None		500	17-13	11-5
Apr. 17	at Stephen F. Austin		SFA Softball Field • Nacogdoches, TX	**L** 5-9	Wilbur (22-3)	**Rhoden** (4-4)	None		150	17-14	11-6
Apr. 18	at Stephen F. Austin		SFA Softball Field • Nacogdoches, TX	**L** 0-6	Wilbur (23-3)	**Howell** (5-7)	None		217	17-15	11-7
Apr. 21	at Southern		Lady Jaguar Field • Baton Rouge, LA	Game postponed							
Apr. 21	at Southern		Lady Jaguar Field • Baton Rouge, LA	Game postponed							
Apr. 24	Sam Houston State		Lady Demon Diamond • Natchitoches, LA	**W** 4-3 (9 inns)	**Howell** (6-7)	Vento (7-5)	None		150	18-15	12-7
Apr. 24	Sam Houston State		Lady Demon Diamond • Natchitoches, LA	**W** 6-4	**Delafield** (8-2)	Dunn (5-9)	None		200	19-15	13-7
Apr. 25	Sam Houston State		Lady Demon Diamond • Natchitoches, LA	**L** 1-6	Billmeier (1-5)	**Howell** (6-8)	None		175	19-16	13-8
Apr. 27	Louisiana Tech		Lady Demon Diamond • Natchitoches, LA	**L** 2-3 (15 inns)	Koenig (1-3)	**Delafield** (9-3)	None		204	19-17	
Apr. 30	at McNeese State		Joe Miller Field at Cowgirl Diamond • Lake Charles, LA	**L** 0-3	Tate (9-7)	**Howell** (6-9)	None		401	19-18	13-9
Apr. 30	at McNeese State		Joe Miller Field at Cowgirl Diamond • Lake Charles, LA	**W** 3-2	**Delafield** (9-3)	Flores (5-8)	None		401	20-18	14-9

May (2-2)
Date	Opponent	Rank	Site/stadium	Score	Win	Loss	Save	TV	Attendance	Overall record	SLC Record
May 1	at McNeese State		Joe Miller Field at Cowgirl Diamond • Lake Charles, LA	**L** 3-5 (8 inns)	Tate (10-7)	**Delafield** (0-4)	None		478	20-19	14-10
May 7	Southeastern Louisiana		Lady Demon Diamond • Natchitoches, LA	**W** 9-4	**Delafield** (10-4)	Zumo (15-6)	None		200	21-19	15-10
May 7	Southeastern Louisiana		Lady Demon Diamond • Natchitoches, LA	**W** 13-5 (5 inns)	**Seely** (1-2)	Hannabas (2-6)	None		200	22-19	16-10
May 8	Southeastern Louisiana		Lady Demon Diamond • Natchitoches, LA	**L** 2-7	Comeaux (8-6)	**Rhoden** (4-5)	None		150	22-20	16-11

Post-Season (2-2)

Southland Tournament (2-2)
Date	Opponent	(Seed)/Rank	Site/stadium	Score	Win	Loss	Save	TV	Attendance	Overall record	Tournament record
May 13	vs. (5) Southeastern Louisiana	(4)	North Oak Park • Hammond, LA	**W** 7-4	**Delafield** (11-4)	Kraft (0-1)	None	ESPN+	343	23-20	1-0
May 13	vs. (1) Stephen F. Austin	(4)	North Oak Park • Hammond, LA	**L** 1-4	Wilbur (30-4)	**Howell** (6-10)	None	ESPN+	335	24-20	1-1
May 14	vs. (7) Sam Houston State	(4)	North Oak Park • Hammond, LA	**W** 8-0 (5 inns)	**Delafield** (12-4)	Dunn (8-12)	None	ESPN+	319	24-21	2-1
May 14	vs. (2) Central Arkansas	(4)	North Oak Park • Hammond, LA	**L** 2-5	Beaver (20-6)	**Delafield** (12-5)	None	ESPN+	339	24-22	2-2

Schedule source:*Rankings are based on the team's current ranking in the NFCA/USA Softball poll.

== Postseason ==
=== Conference accolades ===
- Player of the Year: Kassidy Wilbur – SFA
- Hitter of the Year: Shaylon Govan – SFA
- Pitcher of the Year: Kassidy Wilbur – SFA
- Freshman of the Year: Jenna Wildeman – UCA
- Newcomer of the Year: Jenna Edwards – MCNS
- Coach of the Year: Nicole Dickson – SFA

All Conference First Team

- Shaylon Govan (SFA)
- Bryana Novegil (SFA)
- Haylee Brinlee (MCNS)
- Cori McCrary (MCNS)
- Heidi Jaquez (HBU)
- E. C. Delafield (NSU)
- Mackenzie Bennett (SFA)
- Jenna Wildeman (UCA)
- Megan McDonald (SHSU)
- Aeriyl Mass (SELA)
- Kayla Beaver (UCA)
- Kassidy Wilbur (SFA)

All Conference Second Team

- Kaylyn Shephard (UCA)
- Mary Kate Brown (UCA)
- Lindsey Rizzo (SELA)
- Camryn Middlebrook (SFA)
- Hannah Scheaffer (SHSU)
- Gaby Garcia (SFA)
- Kaylee Lopez (MCNS)
- Donelle Johnson (ACU)
- Jil Poullard (MCNS)
- Audrey Greely (SELA)
- Jordan Johnson (UCA)
- Whitney Tate (MCNS)

All Conference Third Team

- Caitlyn Brockway (HBU)
- Cayla Jones (NSU)
- Alex Hedspeth (SFA)
- Ashlyn Reavis (NICH)
- Chloe Gomez (MCNS)
- Jasie Roberts (HBU)
- Anna Rodenberg (SELA)
- Kaitlyn St. Clair (NSU)
- Sheridan Fisher (SHSU)
- Pal Egan (TAMUCC)
- Lyndie Swanson (HBU)
- Heather Zumo (SELA)
