= 2021 Louisiana Ragin' Cajuns softball team =

American college softball season

2021 Louisiana Ragin' Cajuns softball

Baton Rouge Regionals appearance Sun Belt Conference Tournament champions Sun Belt Conference Regular season Champions
- Conference: Sun Belt Conference

Ranking
- Coaches: No. 15
- Record: 47–12 (21–3 SBC)
- Head coach: Gerry Glasco (4th season)
- Assistant coaches: Mike Roberts; Lacy Prejean
- Home stadium: Yvette Girouard Field at Lamson Park

2021 Sun Belt Conference softball standings
	Conf.				Overall
Team	W		L	PCT	W		L	PCT
No. 15 Louisiana ‍†‍‡‍^{y}	21	–	3	.875	47	–	12	.797
Texas State ‍‍‍^{y}	17	–	6	.739	39	–	14	.736
Troy ‍‍‍^{y}	17	–	6	.739	37	–	17	.685
South Alabama ‍‍‍^{y}	13	–	9	.591	31	–	21	.596
Appalachian State ‍‍‍	8	–	12	.400	27	–	19	.587
Georgia Southern ‍‍‍	9	–	14	.391	17	–	26	.395
UT Arlington ‍‍‍	9	–	14	.391	17	–	34	.333
Coastal Carolina ‍‍‍	9	–	15	.375	21	–	24	.467
Louisiana–Monroe ‍‍‍	6	–	15	.286	17	–	32	.347
Georgia State ‍‍‍	3	–	18	.143	16	–	30	.348
† – Conference champion ‡ – Tournament champion y – Invited to the NCAA tournament As of May 23, 2021; Rankings from NFCA

The 2021 Louisiana Ragin' Cajuns softball team represented the University of Louisiana at Lafayette during the 2021 NCAA Division I softball season. The Ragin' Cajuns played their home games at Yvette Girouard Field at Lamson Park and were led by fourth-year head coach Gerry Glasco. They were members of the Sun Belt Conference.

== Previous season ==
On March 12, 2020, the Sun Belt Conference announced the indefinite suspension of all spring athletics, including softball, due to the increasing risk of the COVID-19 pandemic. On March 16, the Sun Belt formally announced the cancelation of all spring sports, thus ending their season definitely.

The Cajuns finished the abbreviated season 1st in the only-released RPI in the NCAA, thus making them the claimed "RPI National Champions".

== Preseason ==
=== Sun Belt Conference Coaches Poll ===
The Sun Belt Conference Coaches Poll was released on February 8, 2021. Louisiana was picked to finish first in the Sun Belt Conference with 100 votes and 10 first place votes, all first place votes available, for the second year in a row.

Coaches poll
Predicted finish	Team	Votes (1st place)
1	Louisiana	100 (10)
2	Troy	87
3	Texas State	72
4	Coastal Carolina	68
4	UT Arlington	68
6	Appalachian State	43
7	Georgia Southern	38
8	South Alabama	36
9	Louisiana-Monroe	22
10	Georgia State	16

=== Preseason All-Sun Belt team ===
- Summer Ellyson (LA, SR, Pitcher)
- Leanna Johnson (TROY, SO, Pitcher)
- Alissa Dalton (LA, SR, Shortstop/3rd Base)
- Katie Webb (TROY, SR, Infielder/1st Base)
- Raina O'Neal (LA, JR, Outfielder)
- Julie Raws (LA, SR, Catcher)
- Courney Dean (CCU, SR, Outfielder)
- Mekhia Freeman (GASO, SR, Outfielder)
- Korie Kreps (ULM, JR, Outfielder)'
- Kaitlyn Alderink (LA, SR, 2nd Base)
- Jade Gortarez (LA, SR, Shortstop/3rd Base)
- Ciara Bryan (LA, SR, Outfielder)
- Kelly Horne (TROY, SO, Infielder/2nd Base)
- Makiya Thomas (CCU, SR, Outfielder/Infielder)
- Tara Oltmann (TXST, SR, Infielder/Shortstop)
- Jayden Mount (ULM, SR, Infielder)
- Katie Lively (TROY, SO, Outfielder)

Sun Belt Conference Preseason Player of the Year

- Alissa Dalton (LA, SR, Shortstop/3rd Base)

Sun Belt Conference Preseason Pitcher of the Year

- Summer Ellyson (LA, SR, Pitcher)

=== National Softball Signing Day ===
Player	Position	Hometown	Previous Team
Jacquelyn Adams	Infielder	Bryan, Texas	Bryan HS
Jessica Adams	Pitcher	Bryan, Texas	Bryan HS
Laney Credeur	Infielder	Old Mines, Missouri	Kingston
Kramer Eschete	Outfielder	Brenham, Texas	Brenham HS
Kayla Falterman	Outfielder	The Woodlands, Texas	The Woodlands HS
Samantha Graeter	Outfielder/Utility	Spring, Texas	Oak Ridge HS
Maddie Hayden	Outfielder/Utility	West Monroe, Louisiana	West Monroe HS
Elia Hebel	Infielder	Albany, Texas	Albany HS
Samantha Landry	Pitcher	Mont Belvieu, Texas	Barbers Hill HS
Alexa Langeliers	Infielder	Keller, Texas	Keller HS
Tyler Oubre	Pitcher	Destrehan, Louisiana	Destrehan HS
McKenzie Wittenberg	Outfielder	Fort Myers, Florida	Riverdale HS

== Roster ==
2021 Louisiana Ragin' Cajuns roster
Pitchers: 7 Karly Heath – sophomore; 9 Summer Ellyson – senior; 18 Casey Dixon – junior; 26 Taylor Snow – freshman; 27 Vanessa Foreman – sophomore; 53 Kandra Lamb – sophomore; 71 Brinson Rogers – freshman; Outfielders: 2 Raina O'Neal – junior; 4 Ciara Bryan – senior; 5 Frankie Izard – sophomore; 6 Morgan Gray – senior; 8 Taylor Roman – freshman; 16 Kendall Talley – sophomore; 44 Jenna Kean – junior	Catchers: 19 Sophie Piskos – freshman; 23 Julie Rawls – senior; Infielders: 3 Kyleigh Sand – freshman; 10 Justice Milz – senior; 15 Kaitlyn Alderink – senior; 21 Melissa Mayeux – junior; 22 Alissa Dalton – senior; 24 Jade Gortarez – senior; 28 Carrie Boswell – junior; 99 Delaney Enlow – freshman; Designated Player: 17 Bailey Curry – junior

=== Coaching staff ===
2021 Louisiana Ragin' Cajuns coaching staff
- Gerry Glasco – Head coach – 4th year
- Mike Roberts – Associate Head coach – 3rd year
- Lacy Prejean – Assistant Head coach – 3rd year
- Kevin Meyers – Volunteer Assistant Coach – 1st year
- Ashley Pauly – Chief of Staff – 3rd year

== Schedule and results ==
Legend
	Louisiana win
	Louisiana loss
	Postponement/Cancellation
**Bold**	Louisiana team member

2021 Louisiana Ragin' Cajuns Softball Game Log
Regular season (40–10)

February (9–3)
Date	Opponent	Rank	Site/stadium	Score	Win	Loss	Save	TV	Attendance	Overall record	SBC record
Louisiana Classics
Feb. 13	Missouri State	No. 9	Yvette Girouard Field at Lamson Park • Lafayette, LA	Game cancelled due to threat of freezing rain/sleet/snow in Lafayette							
Feb. 13	No. 22 Baylor	No. 9	Yvette Girouard Field at Lamson Park • Lafayette, LA	Game cancelled due to threat of freezing rain/sleet/snow in Lafayette							
Feb. 14	Missouri State	No. 9	Yvette Girouard Field at Lamson Park • Lafayette, LA	Game cancelled due to threat of freezing rain/sleet/snow in Lafayette							
Feb. 14	No. 22 Baylor	No. 9	Yvette Girouard Field at Lamson Park • Lafayette, LA	Game cancelled due to threat of freezing rain/sleet/snow in Lafayette							
Feb. 16	at Lamar	No. 9	Lamar Softball Complex • Beaumont, TX	Game postponed due to threat of freezing rain/sleet/snow in Beaumont							
Feb. 16	at Lamar	No. 9	Lamar Softball Complex • Beaumont, TX	Game postponed due to threat of freezing rain/sleet/snow in Beaumont							
UAB Green & Gold Classic
Feb. 20	vs. Jacksonville State	No. 9	Mary Bowers Field • Birmingham, AL	**W** 8-2	**Lamb** (1–0)	Watkins (0–1)	None		97	1-0	
Feb. 20	at UAB	No. 9	Mary Bowers Field • Birmingham, AL	**W** 1-0	**Ellyson** (1–0)	Woodham (0–2)	None	CUSA.TV	261	2-0	
Feb. 21	vs. Southeastern Louisiana	No. 9	Mary Bowers Field • Birmingham, AL	**W** 9-1 (6 inn)	**Lamb** (2–0)	Hannabas (0–1)	None		55	3-0	
Feb. 21	at UAB	No. 9	Mary Bowers Field • Birmingham, AL	**W** 8-2	**Ellyson** (2–0)	Woodham (0–3)	None	CUSA.TV	226	4-0	
Feb. 23	Eastern Illinois	No. 9	Yvette Girouard Field at Lamson Park • Lafayette, LA	**W** 9-0 (5 inn)	**Dixon** (1–0)	Montgomery (2–1)	None		309	5-0	
Feb. 24	McNeese State	No. 9	Yvette Girouard Field at Lamson Park • Lafayette, LA	**W** 8-7 (8 inn)	**Ellyson** (3–0)	Tate (0–3)	None		244	6-0	
Louisiana-LSU Crossover
Feb. 25	No. 11 LSU	No. 9	Yvette Girouard Field at Lamson Park • Lafayette, LA	**L** 0-4	Gorsuch (1–0)	**Ellyson** (3–1)	None	ESPN+	318	6-1	
Feb. 26	Buffalo	No. 9	Yvette Girouard Field at Lamson Park • Lafayette, LA	**W** 7-0	**Lamb** (3–0)	Marcano (0–3)	None		243	7-1	
Feb. 26	Buffalo	No. 9	Yvette Girouard Field at Lamson Park • Lafayette, LA	**W** 16-0 (5 inn)	**Dixon** (2–0)	Hickingbottom (0–1)	None		243	8-1	
Feb. 27	vs. No. 10 Oklahoma State	No. 9	Tiger Park • Baton Rouge, LA	**W** 7-1	**Ellyson** (4–1)	Simunek (1-1)	None		245	9-1	
Feb. 27	at No. 11 LSU	No. 9	Tiger Park • Baton Rouge, LA	**L** 2-3	Gorsuch (2–0)	**Ellyson** (4–2)	Kiponen (1)	SECN+	456	9-2	
Feb. 28	No. 10 Oklahoma State	No. 9	Yvette Girouard Field at Lamson Park • Lafayette, LA	**L** 3-5 (9 inn)	Eberle (5–0)	**Lamb** (3–1)	None		266	9-3	

March (13–3)
Date	Opponent	Rank	Site/stadium	Score	Win	Loss	Save	TV	Attendance	Overall record	SBC record
Mar. 3	at McNeese State	No. 12	Joe Miller Field at Cowgirl Diamond • Lake Charles, LA	**W** 5-4	**Dixon** (3–0)	Tate (0–5)	**Ellyson** (1)		219	10-3	
Mar. 4	Baylor	No. 12	Yvette Girouard Field at Lamson Park • Lafayette, LA	**L** 1-8	Rodoni (2-2)	**Ellyson** (4–3)	None	ESPN+	262	10-4	
Mar. 6	at Memphis	No. 12	Tigers Softball Complex • Memphis, TN	**W** 7-2	**Lamb** (4–1)	Johnson (0–1)	None			11-4	
Mar. 6	at Memphis	No. 12	Tigers Softball Complex • Memphis, TN	**W** 9-0 (5 inns)	**Heath** (1–0)	Ellett (0–5)	None		326	12-4	
Mar. 7	at Memphis	No. 12	Tigers Softball Complex • Memphis, TN	**W** 11-7	**Lamb** (5–1)	Nichols (1–3)	None		147	13-4	
Mar. 13	Georgia Southern	No. 14	Yvette Girouard Field at Lamson Park • Lafayette, LA	Game postponed due to threat of severe weather in Lafayette							
Mar. 13	Georgia Southern	No. 14	Yvette Girouard Field at Lamson Park • Lafayette, LA	Game postponed due to threat of severe weather in Lafayette							
Mar. 14	Georgia Southern	No. 14	Yvette Girouard Field at Lamson Park • Lafayette, LA	Game postponed due to threat of severe weather in Lafayette							
Mar. 18	at No. 10 Texas	No. 15	Red and Charline McCombs Field • Austin, TX	**L** 0-4	O'Leary (3–0)	**Lamb** (5–2)	None	LHN	434	13-5	
Mar. 18	at No. 10 Texas	No. 15	Red and Charline McCombs Field • Austin, TX	**W** 10-9	**Ellyson** (5–3)	Jacobsen (6–2)	None	LHN	434	14-5	
Mar. 19	at UT Arlington	No. 15	Allan Saxe Field • Arlington, TX	**W** 9-6	**Lamb** (6–2)	Henriksen (0–2)	None		156	15-5	1–0
Mar. 20	at UT Arlington	No. 15	Allan Saxe Field • Arlington, TX	**L** 3-8	Gardiner (2–1)	**Ellyson** (5–4)	None		156	15-6	1-1
Mar. 21	at UT Arlington	No. 15	Allan Saxe Field • Arlington, TX	**W** 4-2	**Lamb** (7–2)	Gardiner (2-2)	None		156	16-6	2–1
Mar. 24	Louisiana Tech	No. 16	Yvette Girouard Field at Lamson Park • Lafayette, LA	Game postponed to April 20 due to threat of inclement weather in Lafayette							
Mar. 26	RV South Alabama	No. 16	Yvette Girouard Field at Lamson Park • Lafayette, LA	**W** 1-0	**Ellyson** (6–4)	Lackie (11–4)	None		282	17-6	3–1
Mar. 27	RV South Alabama	No. 16	Yvette Girouard Field at Lamson Park • Lafayette, LA	**W** 1-0	**Lamb** (8–2)	Hughen (3–4)	None		291	18-6	4–1
Mar. 28	RV South Alabama	No. 16	Yvette Girouard Field at Lamson Park • Lafayette, LA	**W** 6-0	**Lamb** (9–2)	Lackie (11–5)	None		304	19-6	5–1
Mar. 28	Georgia Southern	No. 16	Yvette Girouard Field at Lamson Park • Lafayette, LA	**W** 9-2	**Lamb** (10–2)	Waldrep (2–3)	None		228	20-6	6–1
Mar. 29	Georgia Southern	No. 16	Yvette Girouard Field at Lamson Park • Lafayette, LA	**W** 6-0	**Ellyson** (7–4)	Richardson (2–3)	None	ESPN+	219	21-6	7–1
Mar. 29	Georgia Southern	No. 16	Yvette Girouard Field at Lamson Park • Lafayette, LA	**W** 7-3	**Lamb** (11–2)	Feil (0–4)	None	ESPN+	267	22-6	8–1

April (13–3)
Date	Opponent	Rank	Site/stadium	Score	Win	Loss	Save	TV	Attendance	Overall record	SBC record
Apr. 2	at Georgia State	No. 16	Robert E. Heck Softball Complex • Decatur, GA	**W** 10-2 (5 inns)	**Ellyson** (8–4)	Doolittle (0–2)	None		125	23-6	9–1
Apr. 2	at Georgia State	No. 16	Robert E. Heck Softball Complex • Decatur, GA	**W** 4-0	**Lamb** (12–2)	Mooney (4–6)	None		125	24-6	10–1
Apr. 3	at Georgia State	No. 16	Robert E. Heck Softball Complex • Decatur, GA	**W** 13-1 (5 inns)	**Ellyson** (9–4)	Mooney (4–7)	None		127	25-6	11–1
Apr. 5	at Lamar	No. 16	Lamar Softball Complex • Beaumont, TX	**W** 18-0 (5 inns)	**Lamb** (13–2)	Reyna (1–10)	None		119	26-6	
Apr. 5	at Lamar	No. 16	Lamar Softball Complex • Beaumont, TX	**W** 10-0 (5 inns)	**Dixon** (4–0)	Mixon (1–10)	None		119	27-6	
Apr. 6	at Sam Houston State	No. 14	Bearkat Softball Complex • Huntsville, TX	**W** 8-3	**Ellyson** (10–4)	Dunn (4–6)	None		107	28-6	
Apr. 7	at Houston	No. 14	Cougar Softball Stadium • Houston, TX	**W** 12-5	**Ellyson** (11–4)	Hertenberger (5–6)	None		243	29-6	
Apr. 9	at RV Troy	No. 14	Troy Softball Complex • Troy, AL	**W** 5-2	**Ellyson** (12–4)	Johnson (15–4)	None	ESPN+	192	30-6	12–1
Apr. 10	at RV Troy	No. 14	Troy Softball Complex • Troy, AL	**W** 8-7	**Lamb** (14–2)	Bailey (3–2)	**Ellyson** (2)	ESPN+	135	31-6	13–1
Apr. 11	at RV Troy	No. 14	Troy Softball Complex • Troy, AL	**W** 10-2 (6 inns)	**Ellyson** (13–4)	Baker (4–3)	None	ESPN+	81	32-6	14–1
Apr. 13	Southeastern Louisiana	No. 14	Yvette Girouard Field at Lamson Park • Lafayette, LA	Game cancelled due to threat of inclement weather in Lafayette							
Apr. 17	Texas State	No. 14	Yvette Girouard Field at Lamson Park • Lafayette, LA	**L** 1-5	Mullins (14–3)	**Lamb** (14–3)	None	ESPN+	289	32-7	14–2
Apr. 17	Texas State	No. 14	Yvette Girouard Field at Lamson Park • Lafayette, LA	**W** 7-3	**Ellyson** (14–4)	Mullins (14–4)	None	ESPN+	289	33-7	15–2
Apr. 18	Texas State	No. 14	Yvette Girouard Field at Lamson Park • Lafayette, LA	**W** 8-0 (6 inns)	**Ellyson** (15–4)	Mullins (14–5)	None	ESPN+	283	34-7	16–2
Apr. 20	Louisiana Tech	No. 13	Yvette Girouard Field at Lamson Park • Lafayette, LA	**W** 7-0	**Ellyson** (16–4)	Pickett (4–10)	None	ESPN+	262	35-7	
Apr. 24	at No. 5 Alabama	No. 13	Rhoads Stadium • Tuscaloosa, AL	**L** 3-5	Fouts (15–3)	**Ellyson** (16–5)	None	SECN+	1,413	35-8	
Apr. 25	at No. 5 Alabama	No. 13	Rhoads Stadium • Tuscaloosa, AL	**L** 1-5	Goodman (6–1)	**Lamb** (14–4)	Fouts (3)	SECN+	1,596	35-9	

May (5–1)
Date	Opponent	Rank	Site/stadium	Score	Win	Loss	Save	TV	Attendance	Overall record	SBC record
May 1	at Coastal Carolina	No. 13	St. Johns Stadium – Charles Wade-John Lott Field • Conway, SC	**W** 7-2	**Lamb** (15–4)	De Jesus (5–7)	None	ESPN+	125	36-9	17–2
May 1	at Coastal Carolina	No. 13	St. Johns Stadium – Charles Wade-John Lott Field • Conway, SC	**W** 7-0	**Ellyson** (17–5)	Beasley-Polko (9-9)	None	ESPN+	125	37-9	18–2
May 2	at Coastal Carolina	No. 13	St. Johns Stadium – Charles Wade-John Lott Field • Conway, SC	**W** 10-2 (5 inns)	**Ellyson** (18–5)	Brabham (5–6)	None	ESPN+	125	38-9	19–2
May 6	Louisiana–Monroe	No. 14	Yvette Girouard Field at Lamson Park • Lafayette, LA	**W** 10-1 (5 inns)	**Ellyson** (19–5)	Chavarria (1–10)	None		543	39-9	20–2
May 7	Louisiana–Monroe	No. 14	Yvette Girouard Field at Lamson Park • Lafayette, LA	**W** 8-6	**Ellyson** (20–5)	Hulett (5–8)	None	ESPN+	894	40-9	21–2
May 8	Louisiana–Monroe	No. 14	Yvette Girouard Field at Lamson Park • Lafayette, LA	**L** 1-2	Coons (5–4)	**Ellyson** (20–6)	None	ESPN+	961	40-10	21–3

Postseason (7–2)

SBC Tournament (4–0)
Date	Opponent	(Seed)/Rank	Site/stadium	Score	Win	Loss	Save	TV	Attendance	Overall record	Tournament record
May 12	vs. (9) Louisiana–Monroe	(1)/No. 14	Troy Softball Complex • Troy, AL	**W** 7-0	**Lamb** (16–4)	Hulett (6–10)	None	ESPN+	173	41-10	1–0
May 13	vs. (4) South Alabama	(1)/No. 14	Troy Softball Complex • Troy, AL	**W** 10-3	**Ellyson** (21–6)	Lackie (17–10)	None	ESPN+	167	42-10	2–0
May 14	vs. (2) Texas State	(1)/No. 14	Troy Softball Complex • Troy, AL	**W** 4-3	**Ellyson** (22–6)	King (11–4)	None	ESPN+	188	43-10	3–0
May 15	vs. (4) South Alabama	(1)/No. 14	Troy Softball Complex • Troy, AL	**W** 15-3 (5 inns)	**Ellyson** (23–6)	Hardy (4–3)	None	ESPN+	279	44-10	4–0

NCAA Division I softball tournament (3–2)
Date	Opponent	(Seed)/Rank	Site/stadium	Score	Win	Loss	Save	TV	Attendance	Overall record	Tournament record
Baton Rouge Regionals
May 21	vs. (3) George Washington	(2)/No. 15	Tiger Park • Baton Rouge, LA	**W** 1-0 (11 inns)	**Ellyson** (24–6)	Lange (21–9)	None	ESPN3	1,894	45-10	1–0
May 22	vs. (1)/No. 16 LSU	(2)/No. 15	Tiger Park • Baton Rouge, LA	**L** 3-10	Sunseri (11–6)	**Ellyson** (24–7)	None	SECN	2,475	45-11	1-1
May 22	vs. (4) McNeese State	(2)/No. 15	Tiger Park • Baton Rouge, LA	**W** 4-0	**Ellyson** (25–7)	Edwards (9–3)	**Lamb** (1)	ESPN3	1,920	46-11	2–1
May 23	vs. (1)/No. 16 LSU	(2)/No. 15	Tiger Park • Baton Rouge, LA	**W** 2-0	**Lamb** (17–4)	Kilponen (14–8)	None	SECN		47-11	3–1
May 23	vs. (1)/No. 16 LSU	(2)/No. 15	Tiger Park • Baton Rouge, LA	**L** 5-8	Kilponen (15–8)	**Lamb** (17–5)	None	ESPNU	2,285	47-12	3–2

Schedule source:

*Rankings are based on the team's current ranking in the NFCA/USA Softball poll.

== Baton Rouge Regional ==
Baton Rouge Regional Teams
(1) LSU Lady Tigers	(2) Louisiana Ragin' Cajuns	(3) George Washington Colonials	(4) McNeese State Cowgirls

First Round
7	LSU	10
McNeese State	2
George Washington	0
Louisiana	1
Lower round 1
McNeese State	12
George Washington	0

Semi-Finals
7	LSU	10
Louisiana	3
Lower final
McNeese State	0
Louisiana	4

Finals
7	LSU	0	8
Louisiana	2	5

== Postseason ==
=== Conference accolades ===
- Player of the Year: Ciara Bryan – LA
- Pitcher of the Year: Summer Ellyson – LA
- Freshman of the Year: Sara Vanderford – TXST
- Newcomer of the Year: Ciara Bryan – LA
- Coach of the Year: Gerry Glasco – LA

All Conference First Team

- Ciara Bryan (LA)
- Summer Ellyson (LA)
- Sara Vanderford (TXST)
- Leanna Johnson (TROY)
- Jessica Mullins (TXST)
- Olivia Lackie (USA)
- Kj Murphy (UTA)
- Katie Webb (TROY)
- Jayden Mount (ULM)
- Kandra Lamb (LA)
- Kendall Talley (LA)
- Meredith Keel (USA)
- Tara Oltmann (TXST)
- Jade Sinness (TROY)
- Katie Lively (TROY)

All Conference Second Team

- Kelly Horne (TROY)
- Meagan King (TXST)
- Mackenzie Brasher (USA)
- Bailee Wilson (GASO)
- Makiya Thomas (CCU)
- Kaitlyn Alderink (LA)
- Abby Krzywiecki (USA)
- Kenzie Longanecker (APP)
- Alissa Dalton (LA)
- Julie Rawls (LA)
- Korie Kreps (ULM)
- Kayla Rosado (CCU)
- Justice Milz (LA)
- Gabby Buruato (APP)
- Arieann Bell (TXST)

== Rankings ==
Ranking movements Legend: ██ Increase in ranking ██ Decrease in ranking
	Week															
Poll	Pre	1	2	3	4	5	6	7	8	9	10	11	12	13	14	Final
NFCA / USA Today	9	9	9	12	14	15	16	16	14	14	13	13	14	14	15	
Softball America	8	9	8	12	16	16	20	17	16	15	14	15	15	17	17	
ESPN.com/USA Softball	9	10	7	13	14	15	17	17	17	17	18	18	18	18	18	
D1Softball	7	8	9	12	16	16	18	16	16	15	15	16	13	14	14	
