= Northampton Township, Pennsylvania =

Northampton Township is the name of two places in the U.S. state of Pennsylvania:

- Northampton Township, Bucks County, Pennsylvania
- Northampton Township, Somerset County, Pennsylvania

== See also ==
- Northampton, Pennsylvania, a borough in Northampton County
- Northampton (disambiguation)
