= Northampton (disambiguation) =

Northampton is the county town of Northamptonshire in England.

Northampton may also refer to:

== Australia ==
- Northampton, Western Australia
- Shire of Northampton, Western Australia

== Canada ==
- Northampton Parish, New Brunswick
  - Northampton, New Brunswick, an unincorporated community

== England ==
- Northampton (civil parish)
- Northampton (constituency), former constituency
- John Northampton was mayor of London from 1381 to 1383
- Northamptonshire

== United States ==
Towns and cities:

- Northampton, Massachusetts, college town and county seat of Hampshire County, Massachusetts
  - Union Station (Northampton, Massachusetts)
- North Hampton, New Hampshire
- Northampton, Fulton County, New York
- Northampton, Suffolk County, New York
- Northampton, Pennsylvania
- Northampton, Texas
- Northampton (Hampton, Virginia), a neighborhood

See also:

- North Hampton (disambiguation)

Township:

- Northampton Township, Bucks County, Pennsylvania
- Northampton Township, Somerset County, Pennsylvania

Counties:

- Northampton County, North Carolina
- Northampton County, Pennsylvania
- Northampton County, Virginia

== Ships ==
- Northampton (East Indiaman), two ships
- USS Northampton (CLC-1)
- USS Northampton, an index of ships by this name

== Other ==
- Marquess of Northampton, a title in the British peerage
- Northampton (album), a 2006 album by Enter the Haggis
- Alternative name for the hymn tune "Cranbrook"
