= 2021 Texas State Bobcats softball team =

2021 Texas State Bobcats softball

Austin Regionals appearance
- Conference: Sun Belt Conference
- Record: 39–14 (17–6 SBC)
- Head coach: Ricci Woodard (21st season)
- Assistant coaches: Haley Long; Paige McDuffee
- Home stadium: Bobcat Softball Stadium

2021 Sun Belt Conference softball standings
	Conf.				Overall
Team	W		L	PCT	W		L	PCT
No. 15 Louisiana ‍†‍‡‍^{y}	21	–	3	.875	47	–	12	.797
Texas State ‍‍‍^{y}	17	–	6	.739	39	–	14	.736
Troy ‍‍‍^{y}	17	–	6	.739	37	–	17	.685
South Alabama ‍‍‍^{y}	13	–	9	.591	31	–	21	.596
Appalachian State ‍‍‍	8	–	12	.400	27	–	19	.587
Georgia Southern ‍‍‍	9	–	14	.391	17	–	26	.395
UT Arlington ‍‍‍	9	–	14	.391	17	–	34	.333
Coastal Carolina ‍‍‍	9	–	15	.375	21	–	24	.467
Louisiana–Monroe ‍‍‍	6	–	15	.286	17	–	32	.347
Georgia State ‍‍‍	3	–	18	.143	16	–	30	.348
† – Conference champion ‡ – Tournament champion y – Invited to the NCAA tournament As of May 23, 2021; Rankings from NFCA

The 2021 Texas State Bobcats softball team represented Texas State University during the 2020 NCAA Division I softball season. The Bobcats played their home games at Bobcat Softball Stadium. The Bobcats were led by twenty-first year head coach Ricci Woodard and were members of the Sun Belt Conference.

== Preseason ==
=== Sun Belt Conference Coaches Poll ===
The Sun Belt Conference Coaches Poll was released on February 8, 2021. Texas State was picked to finish third in the Sun Belt Conference with 72 votes.

Coaches poll
Predicted finish	Team	Votes (1st place)
1	Louisiana	100 (10)
2	Troy	87
3	Texas State	72
4	Coastal Carolina	68
4	UT Arlington	68
6	Appalachian State	43
7	Georgia Southern	38
8	South Alabama	36
9	Louisiana-Monroe	22
10	Georgia State	16

=== Preseason All-Sun Belt team ===
- Summer Ellyson (LA, SR, Pitcher)
- Leanna Johnson (TROY, SO, Pitcher)
- Allisa Dalton (LA, SR, Shortstop/3rd Base)
- Katie Webb (TROY, SR, Infielder/1st Base)
- Raina O'Neal (LA, JR, Outfielder)
- Julie Raws (LA, SR, Catcher)
- Courtney Dean (CCU, SR, Outfielder)
- Mekhia Freeman (GASO, SR, Outfielder)
- Korie Kreps (ULM, JR, Outfielder)
- Kaitlyn Alderink (LA, SR, 2nd Base)
- Jade Gortarez (LA, SR, Shortstop/3rd Base)
- Ciara Bryan (LA, SR, Outfielder)
- Kelly Horne (TROY, SO, Infielder/2nd Base)
- Makiya Thomas (CCU, SR, Outfielder/Infielder)
- Tara Oltmann (TXST, SR, Infielder/Shortstop)
- Jayden Mount (ULM, SR, Infielder)
- Katie Lively (TROY, SO, Outfielder)

=== National Softball Signing Day ===
Player	Position	Hometown	Previous Team
Presley Glende	Pitcher	Kirbyville, Texas	Buna HS
Missy Muras	Infielder/Catcher	La Grange, Texas	LaGrange HS
Kaitlyn Dutton	Pitcher/Utility	Mont Belvieu, Texas	Barbers Hill HS
Ciara Trahan	Outfielder	Santa Fe, Texas	Santa Fe HS
Makayla Hall	Catcher	Spring, Texas	Klein Oak HS
Bailee Welsh	Pitcher	Fairhope, Alabama	McGill-Toolen Catholic HS

== Roster ==
2021 Texas State Bobcats roster
Pitchers: 4 Jessica Mullins – freshman; 8 Meagan King – senior; 15 Tori McCann – sophomore; 16 Cassie Valdez – junior; 18 Dalilah Barrera – senior; 23 Brooke Blackwell – junior; Outfielders: 2 Molly Damiani – junior; 6 Marisa Cruz – senior; 10 Kylie George – senior; 11 Piper Randolph – freshman; 19 Arieann Bell – senior	Catchers: 00 Cat Crenek – junior; 13 Caitlyn Rogers – junior; Infielders: 3 Hannah Earls – freshman; 5 Sydney Belvin - Redshirt Freshman; 9 Maya Zavala – sophomore; 12 Raina Lange – freshman; 22 Tara Oltmann – senior; 24 Baylee Lemons – freshman; 25 Hailey MacKay – senior; 26 Sara Vanderford – sophomore; 27 Samara Lagway – junior; Utility: 28 Mia Cantu – freshman

=== Coaching staff ===
2021 Texas State Bobcats coaching staff
- Ricci Woodard – Head coach – 21st year
- Haley Long – Assistant Head coach – 4th year
- Paige McDuffee – Assistant Head coach – 2nd year
- Julia Hollingsworth – Graduate Assistant – 1st year
- Jessie Farmiloe – Volunteer Assistant Coach – 1st year

== Schedule and results ==
Legend
	Texas State win
	Texas State loss
	Postponement/Cancellation/Suspensions
**Bold**	Texas State team member

2021 Texas State Bobcats Softball Game Log
Regular season (36-10)

February (6-2)
Date	Opponent	Rank	Site/stadium	Score	Win	Loss	Save	TV	Attendance	Overall record	SBC record
Feb. 13	RV Texas Tech	RV	Bobcat Softball Stadium • San Marcos, TX	Game postponed due to threat of freezing rain/sleet/snow in San Marcos							
Feb. 14	RV Texas Tech	RV	Bobcat Softball Stadium • San Marcos, TX	Game cancelled due to threat of freezing rain/sleet/snow in San Marcos							
Maverick Classic
Feb. 20	vs. Abilene Christian		Allan Saxe Field • Arlington, TX	Game cancelled due to threat of freezing rain/sleet/snow in Arlington							
Feb. 20	vs. Wichita State		Allan Saxe Field • Arlington, TX	Game cancelled due to threat of freezing rain/sleet/snow in Arlington							
Feb. 21	vs. Wichita State		Allan Saxe Field • Arlington, TX	Game cancelled due to threat of freezing rain/sleet/snow in Arlington							
Feb. 21	vs. Abilene Christian		Allan Saxe Field • Arlington, TX	Game cancelled due to threat of freezing rain/sleet/snow in Arlington							
Feb. 22	Abilene Christian		Bobcat Softball Stadium • San Marcos, TX	**W** 6-0	**Mullins** (1-0)	White (1-2)	None	ESPN+	201	1-0	
Feb. 22	Abilene Christian		Bobcat Softball Stadium • San Marcos, TX	**W** 6-2	**King** (1-0)	Bradley (1-1)	None	ESPN+	201	2-0	
Feb. 24	at No. 7 Texas		Red and Charline McCombs Field • Austin, TX	**L** 0-1	Jacobsen (2-0)	**Mullins** (1-1)	None	Longhorn Network	282	2-1	
Lone Star State Invitational
Feb. 26	Mississippi State		Bobcat Softball Stadium • San Marcos, TX	**W** 4-3	**McCann** (1-0)	Wesley (1-1)	**Mullins** (1)		256	3-1	
Feb. 26	Mississippi State		Bobcat Softball Stadium • San Marcos, TX	**L** 2-6	Fagan (1-0)	**Mullins** (1-2)	None		256	3-2	
Feb. 27	Ole Miss		Bobcat Softball Stadium • San Marcos, TX	**W** 2-1	**Mullins** (2-2)	Diederich (3-4)	None		313	4-2	
Feb. 27	Sam Houston State		Bobcat Softball Stadium • San Marcos, TX	**W** 10-3	**McCann** (2-0)	Bachmeyer (0-3)	None		313	5-2	
Feb. 28	Lamar		Bobcat Softball Stadium • San Marcos, TX	**W** 8-1	**King** (2-0)	Marwitz (0-1)	None	ESPN+	234	6-2	

March (15-1)
Date	Opponent	Rank	Site/stadium	Score	Win	Loss	Save	TV	Attendance	Overall record	SBC record
Mar. 3	at Texas Tech		Rocky Johnson Stadium • Lubbock, TX	**W** 6-5	**Blackwell** (1-0)	Edmoundson (3-3)	**King** (1)			7-2	
Mar. 3	at Texas Tech		Rocky Johnson Field • Lubbock, TX	**L** 2-7	Zoch (3-2)	**King** (2-1)	None			7-3	
Mar. 5	Houston		Bobcat Softball Stadium • San Marcos, TX	**W** 6-1	**Mullins** (3-2)	Hertenberger (2-3)	None	ESPN+	235	8-3	
Mar. 6	Houston		Bobcat Softball Stadium • San Marcos, TX	**W** 8-0 (5 inns)	**McCann** (3-0)	Hudson (3-3)	None	ESPN+	254	9-3	
Mar. 7	Houston		Bobcat Softball Stadium • San Marcos, TX	**W** 5-2	**McCann** (3-0)	Lee (2-2)	None	ESPN+	260	10-3	
Mar. 10	Sam Houston State	RV	Bobcat Softball Stadium • San Marcos, TX	**W** 6-0	**Mullins** (4-2)	Billmeier (0-2)	None		272	11-3	
Mar. 11	BYU	RV	Bobcat Softball Stadium • San Marcos, TX	**W** 2-1	**Mullins** (5-2)	Moffat-Korth (5-6)	None		237	12-3	
Mar. 12	UTSA	RV	Bobcat Softball Stadium • San Marcos, TX	**W** 5-0	**Mullins** (6-2)	Gilbert (1-2)	None		330	13-3	
Mar. 13	UTSA	RV	Bobcat Softball Stadium • San Marcos, TX	**W** 8-1	**King** (3-1)	Nelson (1-1)	None		50	14-3	
Mar. 16	Texas A&M–Corpus Christi	RV	Bobcat Softball Complex • San Marcos, TX	**W** 2-0	**Mullins** (7-2)	Beatriz (6-2)	None		174	15-3	
Mar. 21	at Appalachian State	RV	Sywassink/Lloyd Family Stadium • Boone, NC	**W** 4-3	**King** (4-1)	Longanecker (6-3)	**McCann** (1)		50	16-3	1-0
Mar. 21	at Appalachian State	RV	Sywassink/Lloyd Family Stadium • Boone, NC	**W** 8-3	**Barrera** (1-0)	Holland (3-4)	**Mullins** (2)		50	17-3	2-0
Mar. 23	at Georgia State	RV	Robert E. Heck Softball Complex • Decatur, GA	**W** 6-2	**King** (5-1)	Banks (2-3)	None		137	18-3	3-0
Mar. 23	at Georgia State	RV	Robert E. Heck Softball Complex • Decatur, GA	**W** 9-0	**Mullins** (8-2)	Buck (3-3)	None		131	19-3	4-0
Mar. 24	at Georgia State	RV	Robert E. Heck Softball Complex • Decatur, GA	**W** 10-5	**Mullins** (9-2)	Mooney (4-5)	None		153	20-3	5-0
Mar. 24	at No. 8 Texas	RV	Red and Charline McCombs Field • Austin, TX	Game postponed							
Mar. 30	Tarleton State	RV	Bobcat Softball Stadium • San Marcos, TX	**W** 8-0 (6 inns)	**Mullins** (10-2)	Bridges (5-1)	None	ESPN+	238	21-3	

April (11–6)
Date	Opponent	Rank	Site/stadium	Score	Win	Loss	Save	TV	Attendance	Overall record	SBC record
Apr. 1	Coastal Carolina	RV	Bobcat Softball Stadium • San Marcos, TX	**W** 6-5	**Mullins** (11-2)	Beasley-Polko (5-7)	**King** (2)	ESPN+	263	22-3	6-0
Apr. 1	Coastal Carolina	RV	Bobcat Softball Stadium • San Marcos, TX	**W** 5-1	**King** (6-1)	De Jesus (2-5)	None	ESPN+	263	23-3	7-0
Apr. 2	Coastal Carolina	RV	Bobcat Softball Stadium • San Marcos, TX	**W** 3-2	**King** (7-1)	Brabham (1-4)	None		244	24-3	8-0
Apr. 6	RV Texas A&M	No. 25	Bobcat Softball Stadium • San Marcos, TX	**W** 7-6	**Mullins** (12-2)	Poynter (7-2)	None	ESPN+	330	25-3	
Apr. 9	South Alabama	No. 25	Bobcat Softball Stadium • San Marcos, TX	**L** 1-3	Hughen (6-4)	**Mullins** (12-3)	None	ESPN+	243	25-4	8-1
Apr. 10	South Alabama	No. 25	Bobcat Softball Stadium • San Marcos, TX	**L** 0-1	Lackie (12-6)	**King** (7-2)	None	ESPN+	307	25-5	8-2
Apr. 11	South Alabama	No. 25	Bobcat Softball Stadium • San Marcos, TX	**L** 4-7	Hughes (2-1)	**McCann** (4-1)	Lackie (3)	ESPN+	307	25-6	8-3
Apr. 14	at Baylor		Getterman Stadium • Waco, TX	**W** 7-5	**Mullins** (13-3)	Mansell (6-2)	None	ESPN+	340	26-6	
Apr. 17	at No. 14 Louisiana		Yvette Girouard Field at Lamson Park • Lafayette, LA	**W** 5-1	**Mullins** (14-3)	Lamb (14-3)	None	ESPN+	289	27-6	9-3
Apr. 17	at No. 14 Louisiana		Yvette Girouard Field at Lamson Park • Lafayette, LA	**L** 3-7	Ellyson (14-4)	**Mullins** (14-4)	None	ESPN+	289	27-7	9-4
Apr. 18	at No. 14 Louisiana		Yvette Girouard Field at Lamson Park • Lafayette, LA	**L** 0-8 (6 inns)	Ellyson (15-4)	**Mullins** (14-5)	None	ESPN+	283	27-8	9-5
Apr. 21	at No. 9 Texas	RV	Red and Charline McCombs Field • Austin, TX	**L** 4-5	Day (3-0)	**Mullins** (14-6)	O'Leary (3)	LHN	375	27-9	
Apr. 24	Georgia Southern	RV	Bobcat Softball Stadium • San Marcos, TX	**W** 7-0	**Mullins** (15-6)	Garcia (4-5)	None	ESPN+	325	28-9	10-5
Apr. 24	Georgia Southern	RV	Bobcat Softball Stadium • San Marcos, TX	**W** 3-0	**Barrera** (2-0)	Waldrep (3-6)	**King** (3)	ESPN+	325	29-9	11-5
Apr. 25	Georgia Southern	RV	Bobcat Softball Stadium • San Marcos, TX	**W** 1-0	**King** (8-2)	Garcia (4-6)	None	ESPN+	145	30-9	12-5
Apr. 28	Houston Baptist	RV	Bobcat Softball Stadium • San Marcos, TX	**W** 4-2	**Mullins** (16-6)	Patak (6-9)	**King** (4)	ESPN+	234	31-9	
Apr. 30	at Troy	RV	Troy Softball Complex • Troy, AL	**W** 4-3	**Mullins** (17-6)	Johnson (18-6)	None	ESPN+	134	32-9	13-5

May (4-1)
Date	Opponent	Rank	Site/stadium	Score	Win	Loss	Save	TV	Attendance	Overall record	SBC record
May 1	at Troy	RV	Troy Softball Complex • Troy, AL	**W** 3-0	**King** (9-2)	Baker (6-4)	None	ESPN+	132	33-9	14-5
May 2	at Troy	RV	Troy Softball Complex • Troy, AL	**L** 4-6	Baker (7-4)	**King** (9-3)	None	ESPN+	121	33-10	14-6
May 6	UT Arlington	RV	Bobcat Softball Stadium • San Marcos, TX	**W** 8-0	**Mullins** (18-6)	Valencia (5-6)	None	ESPN+	265	34-10	15-6
May 7	UT Arlington	RV	Bobcat Softball Stadium • San Marcos, TX	**W** 2-1	**King** (10-3)	Bumpurs (2-6)	**Mullins** (3)	ESPN+	271	35-10	16-6
May 8	UT Arlington	RV	Bobcat Softball Stadium • San Marcos, TX	**W** 4-2	**Mullins** (19-6)	Gardiner (3-3)	None	ESPN+	306	36-10	17-6

Postseason (3-4)

SBC Tournament (2-2)
Date	Opponent	(Seed)/Rank	Site/stadium	Score	Win	Loss	Save	TV	Attendance	Overall record	SBC record
May 12	vs. (10) Georgia State	(2)	Troy Softball Complex • Troy, AL	**W** 2-0	**Mullins** (20-6)	Allen (1-2)	None	ESPN+	121	37-10	
May 13	vs. (6) UT Arlington	(2)	Troy Softball Complex • Troy, AL	**W** 4-0	**King** (11-3)	Bumpurs (2-7)	None	ESPN+	138	38-10	
May 14	vs. (1)/No. 14 Louisiana	(2)	Troy Softball Complex • Troy, AL	**L** 3-4	Ellyson (22-6)	**King** (11-4)	None	ESPN+	188	38-11	
May 15	vs. (4) South Alabama	(2)	Troy Softball Complex • Troy, AL	**L** 3-4 (8 inns)	Lackie (18-10)	**McCann** (4-2)	None	ESPN+	321	38-12	

NCAA Division I softball tournament (1-2)
Date	Opponent	(Seed)/Rank	Site/stadium	Score	Win	Loss	Save	TV	Attendance	Overall record	Tournament record
Austin Regionals
May 21	vs. (2)/No. 10 Oregon	(3)	Red and Charline McCombs Field • Austin, TX	**W** 5-1	**King** (12-4)	Yanez (20-6)	None	ESPN3	824	39-12	1-0
May 22	vs. (1)/No. 11 Texas	(3)	Red and Charline McCombs Field • Austin, TX	**L** 0-6	O'Leary (15-4)	**King** (12-5)	None	ESPN2	973	39-13	1-1
May 22	vs. (2)/No. 10 Oregon	(3)	Red and Charline McCombs Field • Austin, TX	**L** 0-2	Yanez (21-6)	**King** (12-6)	None	ESPN3	795	39-14	1-2

Schedule source:

*Rankings are based on the team's current ranking in the NFCA/USA Softball poll.

== Austin Regional ==
Austin Regional Teams
(1) Texas Longhorns	(2) Oregon Ducks	(3) Texas State Bobcats	(4) Saint Francis Red Flash

First Round
Oregon	1
Texas State	5
12	Texas	12
Saint Francis	0
Lower round 1
Oregon	7
Saint Francis	0

Semi-Finals
Texas State	0
12	Texas	6
Lower final
Texas State	0
Oregon	2

Finals
12	Texas
Oregon

== Postseason ==
=== Conference accolades ===
- Player of the Year: Ciara Bryan – LA
- Pitcher of the Year: Summer Ellyson – LA
- Freshman of the Year: Sara Vanderford – TXST
- Newcomer of the Year: Ciara Bryan – LA
- Coach of the Year: Gerry Glasco – LA

All Conference First Team

- Ciara Bryan (LA)
- Summer Ellyson (LA)
- Sara Vanderford (TXST)
- Leanna Johnson (TROY)
- Jessica Mullins (TXST)
- Olivia Lackie (USA)
- Kj Murphy (UTA)
- Katie Webb (TROY)
- Jayden Mount (ULM)
- Kandra Lamb (LA)
- Kendall Talley (LA)
- Meredith Keel (USA)
- Tara Oltmann (TXST)
- Jade Sinness (TROY)
- Katie Lively (TROY)

All Conference Second Team

- Kelly Horne (TROY)
- Meagan King (TXST)
- Mackenzie Brasher (USA)
- Bailee Wilson (GASO)
- Makiya Thomas (CCU)
- Kaitlyn Alderink (LA)
- Abby Krzywiecki (USA)
- Kenzie Longanecker (APP)
- Alissa Dalton (LA)
- Julie Rawls (LA)
- Korie Kreps (ULM)
- Kayla Rosado (CCU)
- Justice Milz (LA)
- Gabby Buruato (APP)
- Arieann Bell (TXST)

== Rankings ==
Ranking movements Legend: ██ Increase in ranking ██ Decrease in ranking — = Not ranked RV = Received votes
	Week																
Poll	Pre	1	2	3	4	5	6	7	8	9	10	11	12	13	14	15	Final
NFCA / USA Today	RV	—	—	—	RV	RV	RV	RV	25	—	RV	RV	RV	—	—		
Softball America	—	—	—	—	—	24	22	22	21	23	—	—	—	—	—		
ESPN.com/USA Softball	—	—	—	RV	RV	RV	RV	RV	23	RV	—	—	—	—	—		
D1Softball	—	—	—	22	24	21	20	22	18	25	—	—	—	—	—		
