= 2021 McNeese State Cowgirls softball team =

American college softball season

2021 McNeese State Cowgirls softball

Baton Rouge Regionals appearance Southland Conference Tournament champions
- Conference: Southland Conference
- Record: 35–26 (18–9 Southland)
- Head coach: James Landreneau (5th season)
- Assistant coaches: Robbie Tate; Shellie Landry
- Home stadium: Joe Miller Field at Cowgirl Diamond

2021 Southland Conference softball standings
	Conf.				Overall
Team	W		L	PCT	W		L	PCT
Stephen F. Austin ‍†‍‍	25	–	2	.926	35	–	12	.745
Central Arkansas ‍‍‍	21	–	6	.778	37	–	19	.661
McNeese State ‍‍‡‍^{y}	18	–	9	.667	35	–	26	.574
Northwestern State ‍‍‍	16	–	11	.593	24	–	22	.522
Southeastern Louisiana ‍‍‍	14	–	10	.583	28	–	23	.549
Houston Baptist ‍‍‍	15	–	12	.556	22	–	17	.564
Sam Houston State ‍‍‍	14	–	13	.519	19	–	31	.380
Abilene Christian ‍‍‍	10	–	17	.370	14	–	33	.298
Incarnate Word ‍‍‍	9	–	18	.333	16	–	27	.372
Texas A&M–Corpus Christi ‍‍‍	8	–	16	.333	18	–	30	.375
Nicholls ‍‍‍	5	–	22	.185	12	–	28	.300
Lamar ‍‍‍	4	–	23	.148	8	–	43	.157
† – Conference champion ‡ – Tournament champion y – Invited to the NCAA tournament As of May 22, 2021; Rankings from NFCA

The 2021 McNeese State Cowgirls softball team represented McNeese State University during the 2021 NCAA Division I softball season. The Cowgirls played their home games at Joe Miller Field at Cowgirl Diamond and were led by fifth year head coach James Landreneau. They were members of the Southland Conference.

== Preseason ==
=== Southland Conference Coaches Poll ===
The Southland Conference Coaches Poll was released on February 5, 2021. McNeese State was picked to finish second in the Southland Conference with 217 votes and four first place votes.

Coaches poll
Predicted finish	Team	Votes (1st place)
1	Stephen F. Austin	235 (17)
2	McNeese State	217 (4)
3	Southeastern Louisiana	183
4	Sam Houston State	172 (1)
5	Central Arkansas	162 (1)
6	Northwestern State	156 (1)
7	Nicholls	131
8	Lamar	86
9	Abilene Christian	82
10	Houston Baptist	81
11	Texas A&M–Corpus Christi	47
12	Incarnate Word	32

=== Preseason All-Southland team ===
==== First Team ====
- Kaylyn Shephard (UCA, R-SR, 1st Base)
- Cayla Joens (NSU, JR, 2nd Base)
- Cylla Hall (UCA, R-SR, 3rd Base)
- Cori McCrary (MCNS, SR, Shortstop)
- Ella Manzer (SELA, SR, Catcher)
- Samantha Bradley (ACU, R-SR, Designated Player)
- Linsey Tomlinson (ACU, R-SR, Outfielder)
- Kaylee Lopez (MCNS, SO, Outfielder)
- Elise Vincent (NSU, SR, Outfielder)
- Madisen Blackford (SELA, SR, Outfielder)
- Megan McDonald (SHSU, SR, Outfielder)
- Kayla Beaver (UCA, R-FR, Pitcher)
- Kassidy Wilbur (SFA, JR, Pitcher)
- E. C. Delafield (NSU, JR, Utility)

==== Second Team ====
- Shaylon Govan (SFA, SO, 1st Base)
- Brooke Malia (SHSU, SR, 2nd Base)
- Bryana Novegil (SFA, SR, 2nd Base)
- Caitlin Garcia (NICH, JR, 3rd Base)
- Alex Hudspeth (SFA, JR, Shortstop)
- Alexis Perry (NSU, SO, Catcher)
- Bailey Richards (SFA, SR, Catcher)
- Caitlyn Brockway (HBU, SO, Designated Player)
- Reagan Sperling (UCA, R-JR, Outfielder)
- Alayis Seneca (MCNS, SO, Outfielder)
- Hayley Barbazon (NSU, SR, Outfielder)
- Saleen Flores (MCNS, SO, Pitcher)
- MC Comeaux (SELA, FR, Pitcher)
- Sammi Thomas (TAMUCC, SO, Utility)

=== National Softball Signing Day ===
Player	Position	Hometown	Previous Team
Amanda Allen	Pitcher	Richmond, Texas	Foster HS
Lindsay Henson	Pitcher	Lawrenceburg, Indiana	East Central HS
Grace Cantu	Outfielder	Celina, Texas	Celina HS
Kelsey Gaspard	Catcher	Roanoke, Louisiana	Northside Christian HS
Reese Reyna	Infielder	Santa Fe, Texas	Santa Fe HS
Katie VanDermark	Infielder	Walker, Louisiana	Live Oak HS
Cristlyne Moreno	Infielder	Converse, Texas	Samuel Clemens HS

== Roster ==
2021 McNeese State Cowgirls roster
Pitchers: 1 Jenna Edwards – senior; 5 Whitney Tate – freshman; 20 Saleen Flores – sophomore; 22 Ashely Vallejo – freshman; Outfielders: 11 Toni Perrin – junior; 14 Kennedy Reynolds – freshman; 15 Taniece Tyson - Redshirt Freshman; 26 Teagan Whitley – freshman; 28 Alayis Seneca – sophomore; Utilities: 3 Sara Geier – sophomore; 4 Kaylee Lopez – sophomore; 10 Padyn Williams – sophomore; 21 Jil Poullard – freshman	Catchers: 6 Rebekah Dilavore – junior; 7 Adriana Ramirez – junior; 12 Gracie Devall – sophomore; 25 Chloe Gomez – freshman; 32 Macy McRight – freshman; Infielders: 9 Caleigh Cross – freshman; 18 Tayler Strother – junior; 19 Amy Reed – sophomore; 23 Haylee Brinlee – sophomore; 24 Cori McCrary – senior; 27 Caylon Brabham – freshman; 29 Aaliyah Ortiz – freshman; 34 Tiffany Steczo – junior

=== Coaching staff ===
2021 McNeese State Cowgirls coaching staff
- James Landreneau – Head coach – 5th year
- Robbie Tate – Assistant Head coach – 2nd year
- Chris Watford – Assistant Head coach – 2nd year

== Schedule and results ==
Legend
	McNeese State win
	McNeese State loss
	Postponement/Cancellation
**Bold**	McNeese State team member

2021 McNeese State Cowgirls Softball Game Log
Regular season (30-24)

February (3-11)
Date	Opponent	Rank	Site/stadium	Score	Win	Loss	Save	TV	Attendance	Overall record	SLC Record
Tiger Classic
Feb. 11	at No. 5 LSU		Tiger Field • Baton Rouge, LA	**L** 0-8 (6 inns)	Sunseri (1-0)	**Vallejo** (0-1)	None	SECN+	261	0-1	
Feb. 12	vs. Kansas		Tiger Field • Baton Rouge, LA	**W** 9-8	**Flores** (1-0)	Reed (0-1)	**Edwards** (1)		75	1-1	
Feb. 12	vs. Kansas		Tiger Field • Baton Rouge, LA	**W** 6-5	**Edwards** (1-0)	Hamilton (0-1)	None		102	2-1	
Feb. 13	vs. No. 25 Duke		Tiger Field • Baton Rouge, LA	**L** 1-9	Walters (1-0)	**Tate** (0-1)	None		65	2-2	
Feb. 16	at South Alabama		Jaguar Field • Mobile, AL	Game Postponed due to threat of inclement travel conditions							
Feb. 17	Louisiana–Monroe		Joe Miller Field at Cowgirl Diamond • Lake Charles, LA	Game Postponed due to threat of freezing rain/snow/sleet in Lake Charles							
Cowgirl Classic
Feb. 20	No. 20 Arkansas		Joe Miller Field at Cowgirl Diamond • Lake Charles, LA	**L** 4-6 (14 inns)	Haff (1-1)	**Vallejo** (0-2)	None		489	2-3	
Feb. 20	No. 20 Arkansas		Joe Miller at Cowgirl Diamond • Lake Charles, LA	**W** 7-4	**Flores** (2-0)	Bloom (0-1)	**Edwards** (2)		489	3-3	
Feb. 21	No. 20 Arkansas		Joe Miller at Cowgirl Diamond • Lake Charles, LA	**L** 1-3	Haff (2-1)	**Flores** (2-1)	None		376	3-4	
Feb. 21	No. 23 Baylor		Joe Miller at Cowgirl Diamond • Lake Charles, LA	**L** 2-3 (9 inns)	Binford (1-0)	**Tate** (0-2)	Rodoni (1)		376	3-5	
Feb. 23	No. 10 Oklahoma State		Joe Miller at Cowgirl Diamond • Lake Charles, LA	**L** 0-5	Eberle (3-0)	**Flores** (2-2)	None		398	3-6	
Feb. 24	at No. 9 Louisiana		Yvette Girouard Field at Lamson Park • Lafayette, LA	**L** 7-8 (8 inns)	Ellyson (3-0)	**Tate** (0-3)	None		244	3-7	
Feb. 26	at No. 22 UCF		UCF Softball Stadium • Orlando, FL	**L** 0-3	White (5-0)	**Vallejo** (0-3)	None	ESPN+	101	3-8	
Feb. 26	at No. 22 UCF		UCF Softball Complex • Orlando, FL	**L** 1-4	Mancha (3-1)	**Tate** (0-4)	None	ESPN+	98	3-9	
Feb. 27	at No. 22 UCF		UCF Softball Complex • Orlando, FL	**L** 3-11 (5 inns)	Jewell (1-0)	**Flores** (2-3)	None		88	3-10	
Feb. 28	at No. 6 Florida		Katie Seashole Pressly Softball Stadium • Gainesville, FL	**L** 0-1 (8 inns)	Hightower (5-0)	**Edwards** (1-1)	None		428	3-11	

March (11-8)
Date	Opponent	Rank	Site/stadium	Score	Win	Loss	Save	TV	Attendance	Overall record	SLC Record
Mar. 3	No. 12 Louisiana		Joe Miller at Cowgirl Diamond • Lake Charles, LA	**L** 4-5	Dixon (3-0)	**Tate** (0-5)	Ellyson (1)		366	3-12	
Cowgirl Classic II
Mar. 5	Texas Southern		Joe Miller at Cowgirl Diamond • Lake Charles, LA	**W** 6-0	**Flores** (3-3)	Gendorf (0-3)	None		265	4-12	
Mar. 5	UTSA		Joe Miller at Cowgirl Diamond • Lake Charles, LA	**W** 6-5	**Vallejo** (1-3)	Hernandez (1-1)	**Edwards** (3)		265	5-12	
Mar. 6	UTSA		Joe Miller at Cowgirl Diamond • Lake Charles, LA	**W** 3-2	**Tate** (1-5)	Williams (1-1)	**Edwards** (4)		307	6-12	
Mar. 6	Texas Southern		Joe Miller at Cowgirl Diamond • Lake Charles, LA	**W** 3-1	**Edwards** (2-1)	Reyes (0-1)	**Flores** (1)		307	7-12	
Mar. 10	at Houston		Cougar Softball Stadium • Houston, TX	**W** 4-3	**Flores** (4-3)	Lee (2-3)	**Tate** (1)	ESPN+	86	8-12	
Mar. 12	Central Arkansas		Joe Miller at Cowgirl Diamond • Lake Charles, LA	**W** 1-0	**Tate** (2-5)	Beavers (5-3)	None		257	9-12	1-0
Mar. 13	Central Arkansas		Joe Miller at Cowgirl Diamond • Lake Charles, LA	**L** 4-5	Beaver (6-3)	**Vallejo** (1-4)	None		207	9-13	1-1
Mar. 13	Central Arkansas		Joe Miller at Cowgirl Diamond • Lake Charles, LA	**W** 5-3	**Tate** (3-5)	Sanchez (4-3)	None		207	10-13	2-1
Mar. 16	No. 10 Texas		Red and Charline McCombs Field • Austin, TX	**L** 2-5	Jacobsen (6-1)	**Tate** (3-6)	None		379	10-14	
Mar. 18	Texas A&M		Joe Miller at Cowgirl Diamond • Lake Charles, LA	**L** 1-5	Herzog (7-1)	**Flores** (4-4)	None		387	10-15	
Mar. 19	at Sam Houston State		Bearkat Softball Complex • Huntsville, TX	**L** 1-6	Dunn (3-3)	**Vallejo** (1-5)	None		109	10-16	2-2
Mar. 20	at Sam Houston State		Bearkat Softball Complex • Huntsville, TX	**L** 0-6	Vento (3-2)	**Tate** (3-7)	None		107	10-17	2-3
Mar. 20	at Sam Houston State		Bearkat Softball Complex • Huntsville, TX	**L** 0-4	Dunn (4-3)	**Flores** (4-5)	None		115	10-18	2-4
Mar. 24	Houston		Joe Miller at Cowgirl Diamond • Lake Charles, LA	**W** 9-3	**Tate** (6-7)	Hulon (0-3)	None		177	11-18	
Mar. 26	at Texas A&M–Corpus Christi		Chapman Field • Corpus Christi, TX	**W** 3-2 (9 inns)	**Edwards** (3-1)	Lara (9-3)	None		141	12-18	3-4
Mar. 26	at Texas A&M–Corpus Christi		Chapman Field • Corpus Christi, TX	**W** 6-1	**Tate** (5-7)	Lombrana (4-7)	None		141	13-18	4-4
Mar. 27	at Texas A&M–Corpus Christi		Chapman Field • Corpus Christi, TX	**W** 9-0	**Edwards** (4-1)	Lara (9-4)	None		151	14-18	5-4
Mar. 31	at South Alabama		Jaguar Field • Mobile, AL	**L** 0-1	Hughen (4-4)	**Flores** (4-6)	Lackie (2)	ESPN+	200	14-19	

April (13–4)
Date	Opponent	Rank	Site/stadium	Score	Win	Loss	Save	TV	Attendance	Overall record	SLC Record
Apr. 2	Lamar		Joe Miller at Cowgirl Diamond • Lake Charles, LA	**W** 7-2	**Edwards** (5-1)	Mixon (1-8)	None		257	15-19	6-4
Apr. 3	Lamar		Joe Miller at Cowgirl Diamond • Lake Charles, LA	**W** 8-0 (5 inns)	**Tate** (6-7)	Reyna (1-9)	None			16-19	7-4
Apr. 3	Lamar		Joe Miller at Cowgirl Diamond • Lake Charles, LA	**W** 2-1	**Vallejo** (2-5)	Mixon (1-9)	**Flores** (2)		257	17-19	8-4
Apr. 7	Louisiana Tech		Joe Miller at Cowgirl Diamond • Lake Charles, LA	**W** 7-1	**Flores** (5-6)	Hernandez (6-5)	None		279	18-19	
Apr. 9	at Southeastern Louisiana		North Oak Park • Hammond, LA	**L** 2-3	Zumo (13-2)	**Vallejo** (2-6)	None		245	18-20	8-5
Apr. 10	at Southeastern Louisiana		North Oak Park • Hammond, LA	**L** 2-3	Hannabas (2-3)	**Flores** (5-7)	DuBois (6)		243	18-21	8-6
Apr. 10	at Southeastern Louisiana		North Oak Park • Hammond, LA	**W** 3-1	**Vallejo** (3-6)	Sitzman (0-2)	None		245	19-21	9-6
Apr. 13	No. 16 LSU		Joe Miller at Cowgirl Diamond • Lake Charles, LA	Game Postponed							
Apr. 16	Abilene Christian		Joe Miller at Cowgirl Diamond • Lake Charles, LA	**W** 7-0	**Tate** (7-7)	White (4-11)	None		256	20-21	10-6
Apr. 17	Abilene Christian		Joe Miller at Cowgirl Diamond • Lake Charles, LA	**W** 7-1	**Edwards** (6-1)	White (4-12)	None			21-21	11-6
Apr. 17	Abilene Christian		Joe Miller at Cowgirl Diamond • Lake Charles, LA	**W** 8-0 (6 inns)	**Vallejo** (3-5)	Harris (0-3)	None		297	22-21	12-6
Apr. 21	at UTSA		Roadrunner Field • San Antonio, TX	**W** 6-3	**Vallejo** (5-6)	Seith (3-3)	None		40	23-21	
Apr. 23	at Incarnate Word		H-E-B Field • San Antonio, TX	**W** 14-6	**Vallejo** (6-6)	Gunther (6-8)	None		75	24-21	13-6
Apr. 24	at Incarnate Word		H-E-B Field • San Antonio, TX	**W** 3-1 (8 inns)	**Tate** (8-7)	Trapp (5-6)	None		75	25-21	14-6
Apr. 24	at Incarnate Word		H-E-B Field • San Antonio, TX	**L** 2-3 (9 inns)	Gunther (7-8)	**Vallejo** (6-7)	None		75	25-22	14-7
Apr. 28	Louisiana–Monroe		Joe Miller at Cowgirl Diamond • Lake Charles, LA	**W** 6-1	**Edwards** (7-1)	Hulett (4-7)	**Tate** (2)		249	26-22	
Apr. 30	Northwestern State		Joe Miller at Cowgirl Diamond • Lake Charles, LA	**W** 3-0	**Tate** (9-7)	Howell (6-9)	None		401	27-22	15-7
Apr. 30	Northwestern State		Joe Miller at Cowgirl Diamond • Lake Charles, LA	**L** 2-3	Delafield (9-3)	**Flores** (5-8)	None		401	27-23	15-8

May (3-1)
Date	Opponent	Rank	Site/stadium	Score	Win	Loss	Save	TV	Attendance	Overall record	SLC Record
May 1	Northwestern State		Joe Miller at Cowgirl Diamond • Lake Charles, LA	**W** 5-3 (8 inns)	**Tate** (10-7)	Delafield (0-4)	None		478	28-23	16-8
May 7	at Nicholls		Swanner Field at Geo Surfaces Park • Thibodaux, LA	**W** 6-2	**Tate** (11-7)	Westbrook (3-10)	None		330	29-23	17-8
May 7	at Nicholls		Swanner Field at Geo Surfaces Park • Thibodaux, LA	**L** 0-1	LaBure (4-5)	**Edwards** (7-2)	None		276	29-24	17-9
May 8	at Nicholls		Swanner Field at Geo Surfaces Park • Thibodaux, LA	**W** 10-2 (6 inns)	**Vallejo** (7-7)	Turner (0-3)	None		202	30-24	18-9

Postseason (5-2)

Southland Tournament (4-0)
Date	Opponent	(Seed)/Rank	Site/stadium	Score	Win	Loss	Save	TV	Attendance	Overall record	Tournament record
May 13	vs. (7) Sam Houston State	(3)	North Oak Park • Hammond, LA	**W** 3-1	**Edwards** (8-2)	Vento (8-8)	None	ESPN+	277	31-24	1-0
May 13	vs. (2) Central Arkansas	(3)	North Oak Park • Hammond, LA	**W** 6-5	**Tate** (12-7)	Johnson (11-8)	**Flores** (3)	ESPN+	335	32-24	2-0
May 14	vs. (1) Stephen F. Austin	(3)	North Oak Park • Hammond, LA	**W** 4-1	**Tate** (13-7)	Wilbur (30-5)	None	ESPN+	304	33-24	3-0
May 15	vs. (2) Central Arkansas	(3)	North Oak Park • Hammond, LA	**W** 1-0	**Edwards** (9-2)	Johnson (11-9)	**Tate** (3)	ESPN+	345	34-24	4-0

NCAA Division I softball tournament (1-2)
Date	Opponent	(Seed)/Rank	Site/stadium	Score	Win	Loss	Save	TV	Attendance	Overall record	Tournament record
Baton Rouge Regionals
May 21	vs. (1)/No. 16 LSU	(4)	Tiger Park • Baton Rouge, LA	**L** 2-10 (6 inns)	Sunseri (10-6)	**Tate** (13-8)	None	ESPNU		34-25	0-1
May 22	vs. (3) George Washington	(4)	Tiger Park • Baton Rouge, LA	**W** 12-0 (5 inns)	**Tate** (14-8)	Lange (21-10)	None	ESPN3	1,991	35-25	1-1
May 22	vs. (2)/No. 15 Louisiana	(4)	Tiger Park • Baton Rouge, LA	**L** 0-4	Ellyson (25-7)	**Edwards** (9-3)	Lamb (1)	ESPN3	1,920	35-26	1-2

Schedule source:

*Rankings are based on the team's current ranking in the NFCA/USA Softball poll.

== Baton Rouge Regional ==
Baton Rouge Regional Teams
(1) LSU Lady Tigers	(2) Louisiana Ragin' Cajuns	(3) George Washington Colonials	(4) McNeese State Cowgirls

First Round
7	LSU	10
McNeese State	2
George Washington	0
Louisiana	1
Lower round 1
McNeese State	12
George Washington	0

Semi-Finals
7	LSU	10
Louisiana	3
Lower final
McNeese State	0
Louisiana	4

Finals
7	LSU
Louisiana

== Postseason ==
=== Conference accolades ===
- Player of the Year: Kassidy Wilbur – SFA
- Hitter of the Year: Shaylon Govan – SFA
- Pitcher of the Year: Kassidy Wilbur – SFA
- Freshman of the Year: Jenna Wildeman – UCA
- Newcomer of the Year: Jenna Edwards – MCNS
- Coach of the Year: Nicole Dickson – SFA

All Conference First Team

- Shaylon Govan (SFA)
- Bryana Novegil (SFA)
- Haylee Brinlee (MCNS)
- Cori McCrary (MCNS)
- Heidi Jaquez (HBU)
- E. C. Delafield (NSU)
- Mackenzie Bennett (SFA)
- Jenna Wildeman (UCA)
- Megan McDonald (SHSU)
- Aeriyl Mass (SELA)
- Kayla Beaver (UCA)
- Kassidy Wilbur (SFA)

All Conference Second Team

- Kaylyn Shephard (UCA)
- Mary Kate Brown (UCA)
- Lindsey Rizzo (SELA)
- Camryn Middlebrook (SFA)
- Hannah Scheaffer (SHSU)
- Gaby Garcia (SFA)
- Kaylee Lopez (MCNS)
- Donelle Johnson (ACU)
- Jil Poullard (MCNS)
- Audrey Greely (SELA)
- Jordan Johnson (UCA)
- Whitney Tate (MCNS)

All Conference Third Team

- Caitlyn Brockway (HBU)
- Cayla Jones (NSU)
- Alex Hedspeth (SFA)
- Ashlyn Reavis (NICH)
- Chloe Gomez (MCNS)
- Jasie Roberts (HBU)
- Anna Rodenberg (SELA)
- Kaitlyn St. Clair (NSU)
- Sheridan Fisher (SHSU)
- Pal Egan (TAMUCC)
- Lyndie Swanson (HBU)
- Heather Zumo (SELA)
