= North Hampton =

North Hampton is the name of several places in the United States, including:

- North Hampton, St. Louis, Missouri, a neighborhood
- North Hampton, New Hampshire, a town
- North Hampton, Ohio, a village

== See also ==
- Northampton (disambiguation)
