= Kevin Ware (American football) =

American football player (born 1980)

No. 48, 47
- Position: Tight end

Personal information
- Born: September 30, 1980 (age 46); San Diego, California, U.S.
- Listed height: 6 ft 3 in (1.91 m)
- Listed weight: 259 lb (117 kg)

Career information
- High school: Klein Oak (Klein, Texas)
- College: Washington
- NFL draft: 2003: undrafted

Career history
- Washington Redskins (2003); San Francisco 49ers (2004); Oakland Raiders (2005)*
- * Offseason or practice squad member only

Career NFL statistics
- Receptions: 4
- Receiving yards: 26
- Stats at Pro Football Reference

Kevin Ware Jr. (born September 30, 1980) is an American former professional football player who was a tight end in the National Football League (NFL) for the Washington Redskins and San Francisco 49ers. He played college football for the Washington Huskies. Ware was sentenced to prison and pleading guilty to the 2021 murder of his girlfriend.

== Early life and college ==
Born in San Diego, Ware played high school football at Klein Oak High School in Harris County, Texas, and college football at the University of Washington.

== Professional career ==
Pre-draft measurables
| Height | Weight | Arm length | Hand span | 40-yard dash | 10-yard split | 20-yard split | 20-yard shuttle | Three-cone drill | Vertical jump | Broad jump | Bench press |
|---|---|---|---|---|---|---|---|---|---|---|---|
| 6 ft 2 7/8 in (1.90 m) | 256 lb (116 kg) | 33 1/4 in (0.84 m) | 9 1/2 in (0.24 m) | 4.80 s | 1.66 s | 2.77 s | 4.47 s | 7.51 s | 34.0 in (0.86 m) | 9 ft 2 in (2.79 m) | 22 reps |
All values from NFL Combine

=== Washington Redskins ===
Ware signed with the Washington Redskins on May 2, 2003, after going undrafted in the 2003 NFL draft. He was waived on August 31, signed to the practice squad on September 2, promoted to the active roster on September 12, waived on September 15, signed to the practice squad on September 17, promoted to the active roster again on September 19, waived on September 22, signed to the practice squad on September 24, and promoted to the active roster for the third time on October 31. Overall, he played in 11 games, starting two, for the Redskins in 2003, catching three passes for 17 yards. Ware was waived on June 29, 2004.

=== San Francisco 49ers ===
Ware was signed by the San Francisco 49ers on August 4, 2004. He was waived on September 11, re-signed by the team on September 14, waived on September 15, and re-signed on October 25. Overall, he appeared in five games for the 49ers during the 2004 season, recording one reception for nine yards. Ware was waived on November 30.

=== Oakland Raiders ===
Ware signed with the Oakland Raiders on May 3, 2005. He was waived by Oakland on June 15.

== Legal history ==
In 2002, while at the University of Washington, Ware pleaded guilty to misdemeanor assault and received a suspended sentence. In 2010, in Houston, he was charged in two separate incidents with theft and with evading arrest after an assault.

In December 2018, Ware was sentenced to two years in prison for intent to manufacture or deliver a controlled substance, a first-degree felony.

On April 19, 2021, Ware was stopped for speeding in Magnolia, Texas. When his car was searched, drugs including cocaine, methamphetamine, marijuana, and a Xanax pill were found, and also a loaded AK-47 and a loaded 9mm pistol. Ware was arrested and charged with two counts of possession with intent to deliver a controlled substance, and with unlawful possession of a firearm as a felon, a third-degree felony in Texas; he was released from jail the following day after posting a $23,000 bond.

Ware was arrested on June 11, 2021, in Spring, Texas, for violating his bail conditions. At the time, his 29-year-old girlfriend Taylor Pomaski was missing and last seen following a party at the couple's shared Spring residence on April 25, at which neighbors reported the couple had quarreled violently. Her beaten, burned, cut up, and strangled remains were found in northern Harris County, Texas on December 10, 2021 and confirmed as Pomaski on May 1, 2022. Ware was indicted for murder and tampering with a corpse on July 28. On May 7, 2025, Ware pleaded guilty and was sentenced to 30 years in prison.
