= Northampton, Texas =

Unincorporated area in Texas, US

Northampton is an unincorporated area in Harris County, Texas, United States. The Northampton Municipal Utility District manages park, electricity, water, and sewage services for the community. As of 2007 the MUD had 1,625 households. The names "Spring, Texas", or "Klein, Texas" may be used in postal correspondence.

As of 2007 the MUD president was E.C. Thomas.

== History ==
The community was established circa 1967.

In 2012 the MUD proposed a bond so it could expand.

== Education ==
Northampton is located in the Klein Independent School District. As of 2007, the zoned schools, all adjacent, were Northampton Elementary School, Hildebrandt Intermediate School, and Klein Oak High School. As of 2007, most residents traveled by foot or on bicycle to school, although school bus services were available.

Northampton Elementary's capacity is 809. It was to be relieved by the opening of French Elementary School in 2015.
