= Northampton (East Indiaman) =

Two and possibly three vessels with the name Northampton have served the British East India Company (EIC).

- Northampton (1740 EIC ship), launched in November 1740, made one voyage in 1741 for the EIC and was on a second voyage in 1744 when she foundered.
- Northampton (1801 ship) was launched in 1801. She made eight voyages to India as an extra (chartered) ship for the EIC between 1801 and 1819. During the same period she made one separate trip transporting convicts from Britain to New South Wales.
- Lloyd's List reported that Northampton, Bagwell, master, had arrived at Gravesend on 26 February 1740 from the East Indies. Lloyd's List further reported that Bagwell and Northampton sailed for China on 14 March 1740 from Portsmouth.
