= Klein Oak High School =

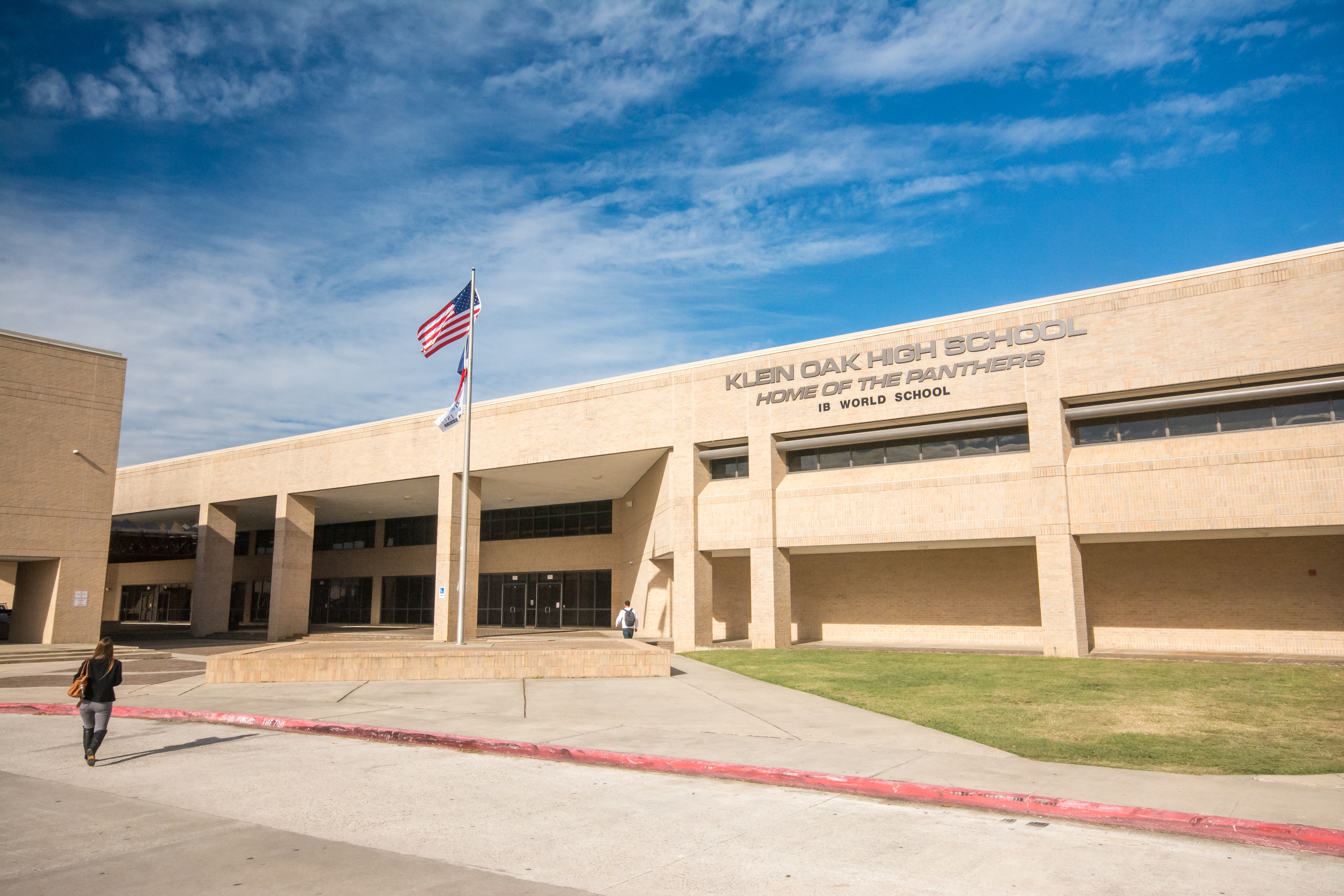
- Klein Oak High School main front entrance

Location
- 22603 Northcrest Dr. Klein, Texas 77389; United States; 30°05′48.6″N 95°31′04.7″W

Information
- School type: Public, High school
- Motto: Promise 2 Purpose
- Established: 1982
- School district: Klein ISD
- Educational authority: Texas Education Agency
- Superintendent: Jenny McGown
- CEEB code: 446691
- Principal: Thomas Hensley
- Faculty: 225.04 FTEs
- Grades: 9–12
- Enrollment: 3,664 (2023-2024)
- Student to teacher ratio: 16.28
- Language: English (primary instruction); ESL instruction available
- Schedule: 7:15a.m.–2:35 p.m.
- Colors: Black and Gold
- Song: Klein Oak Alma Mater
- Fight song: The Victors, Klein Oak Fight Song
- Athletics conference: UIL Class 6A
- Mascot: Panthers
- IB Diploma Exam average: 5.24
- Newspaper: Panther Press
- Graduates (2015): 885
- Website: Klein Oak Homepage

Klein Oak High School is a public high school serving students grades 9–12 in unincorporated Harris County, Texas. The school's principal is Thomas Hensley. It was established August 1982.

Klein Oak was the third high school established in Klein Independent School District to serve grades 9 through 12. It is administered by the school district and serves several areas of unincorporated Harris County, including WindRose, Augusta Pines, and Northampton which are zoned to Klein Oak. Since 2004, the school has been home to the only International Baccalaureate Diploma Program in the district.

In 1996, Klein Oak was named a National Blue Ribbon school by the United States Department of Education.

== History ==
Klein Oak High School was founded in 1982 by the Klein Independent School District under former district superintendent Dr. Donald Collins.

The school received two grants from the state of Texas totaling over $816,000. Beginning in 2009, Klein Oak became the first school in Klein ISD to participate in the one-to-one Tablet PC program, in which each student is issued a personal tablet laptop with which they use to both participate in class and do schoolwork.

In 2012, the school was the seventh largest high school campus in the state of Texas, which prompted the expansion of the school for that school year. Using district bonds, an extra wing was added to the school to be used for freshman classes.

In 2017, portions of the Klein Oak zone that were north of Texas State Highway 99 (Grand Parkway) were rezoned to the newly opened Klein Cain High School.

In 2022, a teacher with the school settled with a student for $90,000 after reportedly forcing the student to write out the Pledge of Allegiance when she refused to say it; a right protected by the 1943 US Supreme Court case West Virginia State Board of Education v. Barnette. The case began in 2017 and the settlement paid by the Texas Association of School Boards.

== Academics ==
For the 1994–1996 school years, Klein Oak High School was recognized with the Blue Ribbon School Award of Excellence by the United States Department of Education, the highest award an American school can receive.

The IB Diploma Programme has been offered at the school since February 2004. It is the only school in Klein ISD which offers the program. The Klein Oak graduating IB class of 2014 all received IB diplomas, becoming the first Klein Oak IB class to achieve a 100% pass rate.

Klein Oak offers the Dual Credit and Advanced Placement programs, for those students wishing to go on to further education. Dual Credit is offered in Economics, English III, English IV, Government, World History, US History, and Business Information Management 2 (BIM2).

For the 2020–21 school year, the school received a B grade from the Texas Education Agency, with an overall score of 88 out of 100. The school received a B grade in two domains, School Progress (score of 83) and Closing the Gaps (score of 84), and an A grade in Student Achievement (score of 90). The school received one of the seven possible distinction designations, Academic Achievement in Social Studies.

== Feeder schools ==
Elementary schools which send their students on to Klein Oak include the Metzler, Northampton, Mueller, Benignus, Schultz, French, and Hassler elementary schools. Intermediate schools sending their students to the school include the Hildebrandt, Hofius, and Krimmel intermediate schools.

== Notable alumni ==
- Phil Anselmo, music icon, vocalist of heavy metal band Pantera and several other bands (only attended for 9 weeks in 1984).
- Courtland Guillory (born 2006, class of 2025), college football cornerback for the Oklahoma Sooners
- Joey Harris (born 1980, class of 2000), former National Football League running back
- Dwight McGlothern (born 2002, class of 2020), NFL cornerback for the Minnesota Vikings
- Jim Parsons (born 1973, class of 1991), actor best known for his role as Sheldon Cooper on The Big Bang Theory
- Raufeon Stots (born 1988, class of 2008), two-time NCAA Division II Wrestling Champion, current Bellator mixed martial artist
- Eddie Steeples (born 1973, class of 1992), actor
- Justin Thompson (born 1973, class of 1991), former Major League Baseball All-Star
- Kevin Ware (born 1980, class of 1999), former football tight end
