= SFA Softball Field =

Softball stadium in Nacogdoches, Texas

- Interactive map of SFA Softball Field
- Location: Adjacent to Jaycees Field baseball stadium on 3715 Old Tyler Road in the Pete Smith Athletic Complex, Nacogdoches, Texas
- Coordinates: 31°38′0″N 94°40′55.6″W
- Owner: City of Nacogdoches, Texas
- Operator: Stephen F. Austin State University
- Seating type: Bleacher seats
- Capacity: 750
- Surface: Grass
- Scoreboard: Daktronics Electronic
- Field size: Left Field: 202 ft Center Field: 220 ft Right Field: 204 ft (Estimated)

Construction
- Opened: February 17, 2010
- Renovated: 2010

Tenant
- Stephen F. Austin Ladyjacks softball (NCAA) (2010-Present)

SFA Softball Field is the home stadium for the Division I (NCAA) Stephen F. Austin Ladyjacks softball team. The stadium is located next to Jaycees Field, home of the Stephen F. Austin Lumberjacks baseball team, in Nacogdoches, Texas. The stadium has seating for 750 fans. Stephen F. Austin State University has a nineteen (19) year exclusive use lease on the stadium with the City of Nacogdoches, Texas starting in 2010. The university made several improvements to the preexisting city softball field including a new playing surface, a warning track, a Daktronics electronic scoreboard, new dugouts, windscreens, a new grandstand, an expanded press box, and bullpens.

The initial home game as the Ladyjacks's official home field was played on February 17, 2010, against the North Texas Mean Green softball team.

The stadium was the home of 2013 Southland Conference softball tournament.

== Yearly Attendance ==
Below is a yearly summary of the SFA Softball Field attendance.

Season	Average	High	High Opponent
Yearly Home Attendance
2014-15			
2013-14	108	204	Nicholls
2012-13	127	153	Lamar, Northwestern State
2011-12	132	201	Louisiana Tech
2010-11	140	354	Texas A&M
2009-10	207	387	Texas State

As of the 2013–14 season.
