= Bearkat Softball Complex =

Texan stadium

- Interactive map of Bearkat Softball Complex
- Location: 1818 Sycamore, Huntsville, Texas
- Coordinates: 30°42′51.1″N 95°32′26.4″W
- Owner: Sam Houston State University
- Operator: Sam Houston State University
- Seating type: Chairback seats Bleacher seats
- Capacity: 400
- Surface: Turf
- Scoreboard: Electronic
- Record attendance: 759; May 11, 2013; Northwestern State
- Field size: Left Field: 190 ft Center Field: 220 ft Right Field: 190 ft

Construction
- Built: 2005-06
- Opened: February 11, 2006
- Cost: $5.5 million

Tenant
- Sam Houston State Bearkats softball (NCAA) (2006-Present)

The Bearkat Softball Complex is the home stadium for the Division I (NCAA) Sam Houston State Bearkats softball team. Located next to the Bowers Stadium on the campus of Sam Houston State University, the stadium features seating for 400 fans. Included in the 400 seat capacity is a combination of partially covered chair back and bleacher seats. The stadium has field lighting, bullpens, dugouts, a press box, an enclosed hitting area, and an electronic scoreboard. Also included is coaches offices, locker rooms' training rooms' concessions, a conference room, and restrooms.

The initial home game was played in February, 2006.

The 2007 and 2011 Southland Conference softball tournaments were held at the Bearkat Softball Complex. The Bearkats won the 2007 Southland Conference softball tournament and the conference NCAA tournament auto-bid, resulting in the first national tournament trip in school history. During their first decade at the facility, the Bearkats had a record of 134-79.

== Rentals ==
The stadium can be rented for $1,500 for day games, $1,700 for night games and $2,000 for double-headers.

== Yearly attendance ==
Below is a yearly summary of the Bearkat Softball Complex attendance.

Season	Average	High	High Opponent
Yearly Home Attendance
2022-23	324	575	Stephen F. Austin
2021-22	245	775	Wichita St.
2020-21	111	135	Incarnate Word
2019-20	470	685	Loyola Chicago
2018-19	278	408	Stephen F. Austin
2017-18	270		
2016-17	310		
2015-16	315		
2014-15			
2013-14	296	681	Texas A&M
2012-13	338	713	Northwestern State
2011-12	278	462	Texas State
2010-11	260	413	Texas A&M
2009-10	201	561	Texas A&M
2008-09	231	423	Texas A&M
2007-08	140	232	McNeese State
2006-07	175	709	Texas A&M
2005-06	334	381	Louisiana Tech

As of the 2013–14 season.
