= 2021 Georgia Southern Eagles softball team =

College sports team

2021 Georgia Southern Eagles softball
- Conference: Sun Belt Conference
- Record: 17–26 (9–14 SBC)
- Head coach: Kim Dean (4th season)
- Assistant coaches: Brock Van Faussien; Dani Price
- Home stadium: Eagle Field at GS Softball Complex

2021 Sun Belt Conference softball standings
	Conf.				Overall
Team	W		L	PCT	W		L	PCT
No. 15 Louisiana ‍†‍‡‍^{y}	21	–	3	.875	47	–	12	.797
Texas State ‍‍‍^{y}	17	–	6	.739	39	–	14	.736
Troy ‍‍‍^{y}	17	–	6	.739	37	–	17	.685
South Alabama ‍‍‍^{y}	13	–	9	.591	31	–	21	.596
Appalachian State ‍‍‍	8	–	12	.400	27	–	19	.587
Georgia Southern ‍‍‍	9	–	14	.391	17	–	26	.395
UT Arlington ‍‍‍	9	–	14	.391	17	–	34	.333
Coastal Carolina ‍‍‍	9	–	15	.375	21	–	24	.467
Louisiana–Monroe ‍‍‍	6	–	15	.286	17	–	32	.347
Georgia State ‍‍‍	3	–	18	.143	16	–	30	.348
† – Conference champion ‡ – Tournament champion y – Invited to the NCAA tournament As of May 23, 2021; Rankings from NFCA

The 2021 Georgia Southern Eagles softball team represented Georgia Southern University during the 2021 NCAA Division I softball season. The Eagles played their home games at Eagle Field at GS Softball Complex. The Eagles were led by third-year head coach Kim Dean and were members of the Sun Belt Conference.

== Preseason ==
=== Sun Belt Conference Coaches Poll ===
The Sun Belt Conference Coaches Poll was released on February 8, 2021. Georgia Southern was picked to finish seventh in the Sun Belt Conference with 38 votes.

Coaches poll
Predicted finish	Team	Votes (1st place)
1	Louisiana	100 (10)
2	Troy	87
3	Texas State	72
4	Coastal Carolina	68
4	UT Arlington	68
6	Appalachian State	43
7	Georgia Southern	38
8	South Alabama	36
9	Louisiana-Monroe	22
10	Georgia State	16

=== Preseason All-Sun Belt team ===
- Summer Ellyson (LA, SR, Pitcher)
- Leanna Johnson (TROY, SO, Pitcher)
- Allisa Dalton (LA, SR, Shortstop/3rd Base)
- Katie Webb (TROY, SR, Infielder/1st Base)
- Raina O'Neal (LA, JR, Outfielder)
- Julie Raws (LA, SR, Catcher)
- Courtney Dean (CCU, SR, Outfielder)
- Mekhia Freeman (GASO, SR, Outfielder)
- Korie Kreps (ULM, JR, Outfielder)
- Kaitlyn Alderink (LA, SR, 2nd Base)
- Jade Gortarez (LA, SR, Shortstop/3rd Base)
- Ciara Bryan (LA, SR, Outfielder)
- Kelly Horne (TROY, SO, Infielder/2nd Base)
- Makiya Thomas (CCU, SR, Outfielder/Infielder)
- Tara Oltmann (TXST, SR, Infielder/Shortstop)
- Jayden Mount (ULM, SR, Infielder)
- Katie Lively (TROY, SO, Outfielder)

=== National Softball Signing Day ===
Player	Position	Hometown	Previous Team
Sydney Stewart	Infielder/Outfielder	Fortson, Georgia	Harris County HS
Emma Strickland	1st Base/Utility	Colbert, Georgia	Madison County HS
Reign Williams	Catcher/3rd Base	Buckhead, Georgia	George Walton Academy

== Roster ==
2021 Georgia Southern Eagles roster
Pitchers: 4 Jess Mazur - Junior; 12 Rylee Waldrep - Senior; 17 Anna Feil - Freshman; 19 Harlee Rewis - Senior; 31 Kyleigh Richardson - Sophomore; 77 Aaliyah Garcia - Sophomore; Outfielders: 6 Mekhia Freeman - Senior; 10 Alisha House - Sophomore; 15 Ashleigh Duty - Sophomore; 25 Mary Grace Howard - Junior; 42 Dejah Mills - Freshman; 44 Sydney Harris - Freshman; 99 Madi Banks - Freshman	Catchers: 14 Linzie Lafavor - Sophomore; 20 Janai Conklin - Sophomore; 91 Allyssah Mullis - Senior; Infielders: 1 Shayla Smith - Senior; 7 Bailee Wilson - Sophomore; 22 Ashlynn Gunter - Junior; 24 Alia Booth - Senior; 26 Jaelyn Darley - Freshman; 33 Aniston Johnson - Freshman

=== Coaching staff ===
2021 Georgia Southern Eagles coaching staff
- Kim Dean – Head Coach – 4th year
- Dani Price – Assistant Head Coach – 3rd year
- Brock Van Faussien – Assistant Head Coach – 3rd year
- Olivia Clark-Kittleson – Graduate Assistant Coach – 3rd year

== Schedule and results ==
Legend
	Georgia Southern win
	Georgia Southern loss
	Postponement/Cancellation/Suspensions
**Bold**	Georgia Southern team member

2021 Georgia Southern Eagles softball game log
Regular season (17-25)

February (1-7)
Date	Opponent	Rank	Site/stadium	Score	Win	Loss	Save	TV	Attendance	Overall record	SBC record
Bash in the Boro
Feb. 12	Western Kentucky		Eagle Field at GS Softball Complex • Statesboro, GA	Game cancelled due to threat of freezing rain/sleet/snow in Statesboro							
Feb. 13	Western Kentucky		Eagle Field at GS Softball Complex • Statesboro, GA	Game cancelled due to threat of freezing rain/sleet/snow in Statesboro							
Feb. 13	UNC Wilmington		Eagle Field at GS Softball Complex • Statesboro, GA	Game cancelled due to threat of freezing rain/sleet/snow in Statesboro							
Feb. 14	UNC Wilmington		Eagle Field at GS Softball Complex • Statesboro, GA	Game cancelled due to threat of freezing rain/sleet/snow in Statesboro							
UF Bubly Invitational
Feb. 19	at No. 6 Florida		Katie Seashole Pressly Softball Stadium • Gainesville, FL	**L** 3-8	Lugo (1-0)	**Garcia** (0-1)	None		378	0-1	
Feb. 20	vs. Charlotte		Katie Seashole Pressly Softball Stadium • Gainesville, FL	**L** 4-5 (8 inn)						0-2	
Feb. 20	at No. 6 Florida		Katie Seashole Pressly Softball Stadium • Gainesville, FL	**L** 1-2	Chronister (3-0)	**Richardson** (0-1)	None			0-3	
Feb. 21	vs. Charlotte		Katie Seashole Pressly Softball Stadium • Gainesville, FL	**W** 13-5 (6 inn)	**Garcia** (1-1)	Wright (1-1)	None			1-3	
Feb. 21	at No. 6 Florida		Katie Seashole Pressly Softball Stadium • Gainesville, FL	**L** 0-11 (5 inn)	Hightower (3-0)	**Waldrep** (0-1)	None		451	1-4	
Feb. 26	at North Florida		UNF Softball Complex • Jacksonville, FL	**L** 4-5 (9 inn)	Arends (2-1)	**Harlee** (0-1)	None		42	1-5	
Feb. 27	at North Florida		UNF Softball Complex • Jacksonville, FL	**L** 5-6	Clausen (1-2)	**Waldrep** (0-2)	Arends (1)		60	1-6	
Feb. 27	at North Florida		UNF Softball Complex • Jacksonville, FL	**L** 2-3	Arends (3-1)	**Garcia** (1-2)	None			1-7	

March (6-7)
Date	Opponent	Rank	Site/stadium	Score	Win	Loss	Save	TV	Attendance	Overall record	SBC record
Eagle Round Robin
Mar. 5	Winthrop		Eagle Field at GS Softball Complex • Statesboro, GA	**W** 8-2	**Waldrep** (1-2)	Watson (3-6)	None		150	2-7	
Mar. 5	Winthrop		Eagle Field at GS Softball Complex • Statesboro, GA	**W** 3-2	**Rewis** (1-1)	Weixlmann (4-3)	None		150	3-7	
Mar. 6	Winthrop		Eagle Field at GS Softball Complex • Statesboro, GA	**L** 3-14	Cyzick (1-2)	**Feil** (0-2)	None		123	3-8	
Mar. 6	College of Charleston		Eagle Field at GS Softball Complex • Statesboro, GA	**W** 2-1	**Richardson** (1-1)	Burke (0-2)	None		145	4-8	
Mar. 7	College of Charleston		Eagle Field at GS Softball Complex • Statesboro, GA	**W** 2-1	**Garcia** (2-2)	Lemire (1-2)	None	ESPN+	145	5-8	
Mar. 10	at No. 20 South Carolina		Carolina Softball Stadium • Columbia, SC	**L** 1-9 (6 inns)	Drotar (1-0)	**Richardson** (1-2)	None	ESPN+	400	5-9	
Mar. 13	at No. 14 Louisiana		Yvette Girouard Field at Lamson Park • Lafayette, LA	Game postponed due to COVID measures							
Mar. 13	at No. 14 Louisiana		Yvette Girouard Field at Lamson Park • Lafayette, LA	Game postponed due to COVID measures							
Mar. 14	at No. 14 Louisiana		Yvette Girouard Field at Lamson Park • Lafayette, LA	Game postponed due to COVID measures							
Mar. 17	at Mercer		Sikes Field • Macon, GA	Game postponed due to COVID measures							
Mar. 17	at Mercer		Sikes Field • Macon, GA	Game postponed due to COVID measures							
Mar. 20	Louisiana–Monroe		Eagle Field at GS Softball Complex • Statesboro, GA	**L** 3-5	Williams (1-4)	**Garcia** (2-3)	Hulett (2)	ESPN+	165	5-10	0-1
Mar. 20	Louisiana–Monroe		Eagle Field at GS Softball Complex • Statesboro, GA	**L** 9-11 (8 inns)	Williams (2-4)	**Feil** (0-3)	None	ESPN+	165	5-11	0-2
Mar. 21	Louisiana–Monroe		Eagle Field at GS Softball Complex • Statesboro, GA	Game cancelled							
Mar. 24	at No. 17 Georgia		Jack Turner Stadium • Athens, GA	Game postponed							
Mar. 26	FIU		Eagle Field at GS Softball Complex • Statesboro, GA	**W** 5-0	**Waldrep** (2-2)	Linneman (2-2)	**Feil** (1)	ESPN+	135	6-11	
Mar. 26	FIU		Eagle Field at GS Softball Complex • Statesboro, GA	**W** 9-7	**Richardson** (2-2)	Dunford (4-8)	None	ESPN+	135	7-11	
Mar. 28	at No. 16 Louisiana		Yvette Girouard Field at Lamson Park • Lafayette, LA	**L** 2-9	Lamb (10-2)	**Waldrep** (2-3)	None		228	7-12	0-3
Mar. 29	at No. 16 Louisiana		Yvette Girouard Field at Lamson Park • Lafayette, LA	**L** 0-6	Ellyson (7-4)	**Richardson** (2-3)	None	ESPN+	219	7-13	0-4
Mar. 29	at No. 16 Louisiana		Yvette Girouard Field at Lamson Park • Lafayette, LA	**L** 3-7	Lamb (11-4)	**Feil** (0-4)	None	ESPN+	267	7-14	0-5

April (5–12)
Date	Opponent	Rank	Site/stadium	Score	Win	Loss	Save	TV	Attendance	Overall record	SBC record
Apr. 2	at Troy		Troy Softball Complex • Troy, AL	**L** 0-5	Johnson (13-3)	**Richardson** (2-4)	None	ESPN+	150	7-15	0-6
Apr. 2	at Troy		Troy Softball Complex • Troy, AL	**L** 0-4	Brianna (3-1)	**Waldrep** (2-4)	None	ESPN+	114	7-16	0-7
Apr. 3	at Troy		Troy Softball Complex • Troy, AL	**L** 0-9 (5 inns)	Johnson (13-3)	**Feil** (0-5)	None	ESPN+	134	7-17	0-8
Apr. 9	at Coastal Carolina		St. Johns Stadium – Charles Webb-John Lott Field • Conway, SC	**L** 3-5	Brabham (2-5)	**Rewis** (1-2)	None	ESPN+	125	7-18	0-9
Apr. 10	at Coastal Carolina		St. Johns Stadium – Charles Webb-John Lott Field • Conway, SC	**W** 9-1 (6 inns)	**Richardson** (3-4)	De Jesus (2-6)	None	ESPN+	125	8-18	1-9
Apr. 10	at Coastal Carolina		St. Johns Stadium – Charles Webb-John Lott Field • Conway, SC	**W** 7-6	**Waldrep** (3-4)	Brabham (2-5)	**Rewis** (1)	ESPN+	124	9-18	2-9
Apr. 13	Charleston Southern		Eagle Field at GS Softball Complex • Statesboro, GA	**L** 7-8	Clark (3-3)	**Garcia** (2-4)	None	ESPN+	101	9-19	
Apr. 13	Charleston Southern		Eagle Field at GS Softball Complex • Statesboro, GA	**L** 1-4	Heinrich (3-5)	**Richardson** (3-5)	None	ESPN+		9-20	
Apr. 16	Appalachian State		Eagle Field at GS Softball Complex • Statesboro, GA	**W** 11-3 (6 inns)	**Garcia** (3-4)	Longanecker (11-4)	**Richardson** (1)	ESPN+	135	10-20	3-9
Apr. 16	Appalachian State		Eagle Field at GS Softball Complex • Statesboro, GA	**L** 3-6	Holland (6-4)	**Waldrep** (3-5)	Buckner (1)	ESPN+		10-21	3-10
Apr. 17	Appalachian State		Eagle Field at GS Softball Complex • Statesboro, GA	**L** 2-5	Holland (7-4)	**Feil** (0-6)	None	ESPN+	150	10-22	3-11
Apr. 21	Jacksonville		Eagle Field at GS Softball Complex • Statesboro, GA	**W** 6-0	**Garcia** (4-4)	Seana (6-1)	None	ESPN+	124	11-22	
Apr. 24	at Texas State		Bobcat Softball Stadium • San Marcos, TX	**L** 0-7	Mullins (15-6)	**Garcia** (4-5)	None	ESPN+		11-23	3-12
Apr. 24	at Texas State		Bobcat Softball Stadium • San Marcos, TX	**L** 0-3	Barrera (2-0)	**Waldrep** (3-6)	King (3)	ESPN+	325	11-24	3-13
Apr. 25	at Texas State		Bobcat Softball Stadium • San Marcos, TX	**L** 0-1	King (8-2)	**Garcia** (4-6)	None	ESPN+	145	11-25	3-14
Apr. 30	South Alabama		Eagle Field at GS Softball Complex • Statesboro, GA	**W** 9-1 (5 inns)	**Garcia** (5-6)	Lackie (15-7)	None	ESPN+	126	12-25	4-14

May (5-0)
Date	Opponent	Rank	Site/stadium	Score	Win	Loss	Save	TV	Attendance	Overall record	SBC record
May 1	South Alabama		Eagle Field at GS Softball Complex • Statesboro, GA	**W** 4-3 (8 inns)	**Rewis** (2-2)	Hardy (2-2)	None	ESPN+	165	13-25	5-14
May 2	South Alabama		Eagle Field at GS Softball Complex • Statesboro, GA	**W** 2-0	**Garcia** (6-6)	Lackie (15-8)	None	ESPN+	145	14-25	6-14
May 6	at Georgia State		Robert E. Heck Softball Complex • Decatur, GA	**W** 5-4	**Richardson** (4-5)	Mooney (6-11)	None		283	15-25	7-14
May 7	at Georgia State		Robert E. Heck Softball Complex • Decatur, GA	**W** 11-7 (8 inns)	**Rewis** (3-2)	Banks (2-4)	None		285	16-25	8-14
May 7	at Georgia State		Robert E. Heck Softball Complex • Decatur, GA	**W** 9-4	**Garcia** (7-6)	Doolittle (0-5)	None		285	17-25	9-14

Post-Season (0-1)

SBC tournament (0-1)
Date	Opponent	(Seed)/Rank	Site/stadium	Score	Win	Loss	Save	TV	Attendance	Overall record	SBC record
May 11	vs. (10) Georgia State	(7)	Troy Softball Complex • Troy, AL	**L** 1-4	Mooney (7-11)	**Garcia** (7-7)	None	ESPN+	97	17-26	

Schedule source:

*Rankings are based on the team's current ranking in the NFCA/USA Softball poll.

== Postseason ==
=== Conference accolades ===
- Player of the Year: Ciara Bryan – LA
- Pitcher of the Year: Summer Ellyson – LA
- Freshman of the Year: Sara Vanderford – TXST
- Newcomer of the Year: Ciara Bryan – LA
- Coach of the Year: Gerry Glasco – LA

All Conference First Team

- Ciara Bryan (LA)
- Summer Ellyson (LA)
- Sara Vanderford (TXST)
- Leanna Johnson (TROY)
- Jessica Mullins (TXST)
- Olivia Lackie (USA)
- Kj Murphy (UTA)
- Katie Webb (TROY)
- Jayden Mount (ULM)
- Kandra Lamb (LA)
- Kendall Talley (LA)
- Meredith Keel (USA)
- Tara Oltmann (TXST)
- Jade Sinness (TROY)
- Katie Lively (TROY)

All Conference Second Team

- Kelly Horne (TROY)
- Meagan King (TXST)
- Mackenzie Brasher (USA)
- Bailee Wilson (GASO)
- Makiya Thomas (CCU)
- Kaitlyn Alderink (LA)
- Abby Krzywiecki (USA)
- Kenzie Longanecker (APP)
- Alissa Dalton (LA)
- Julie Rawls (LA)
- Korie Kreps (ULM)
- Kayla Rosado (CCU)
- Justice Milz (LA)
- Gabby Buruato (APP)
- Arieann Bell (TXST)
