= 2021 Coastal Carolina Chanticleers softball team =

American college softball season

2021 Coastal Carolina Chanticleers softball
- Conference: Sun Belt Conference
- Record: 21–24 (9–15 SBC)
- Head coach: Kelley Green (12th season)
- Assistant coaches: Danielle Penner; Kristin Erb
- Home stadium: St. John Stadium – Charles Wade-John Lott Field

2021 Sun Belt Conference softball standings
	Conf.				Overall
Team	W		L	PCT	W		L	PCT
No. 15 Louisiana ‍†‍‡‍^{y}	21	–	3	.875	47	–	12	.797
Texas State ‍‍‍^{y}	17	–	6	.739	39	–	14	.736
Troy ‍‍‍^{y}	17	–	6	.739	37	–	17	.685
South Alabama ‍‍‍^{y}	13	–	9	.591	31	–	21	.596
Appalachian State ‍‍‍	8	–	12	.400	27	–	19	.587
Georgia Southern ‍‍‍	9	–	14	.391	17	–	26	.395
UT Arlington ‍‍‍	9	–	14	.391	17	–	34	.333
Coastal Carolina ‍‍‍	9	–	15	.375	21	–	24	.467
Louisiana–Monroe ‍‍‍	6	–	15	.286	17	–	32	.347
Georgia State ‍‍‍	3	–	18	.143	16	–	30	.348
† – Conference champion ‡ – Tournament champion y – Invited to the NCAA tournament As of May 23, 2021; Rankings from NFCA

The 2021 Coastal Carolina Chanticleers softball team represented Coastal Carolina University during the 2020 NCAA Division I softball season. The Chanticleers played their home games at St. John Stadium – Charles Wade-John Lott Field. The Chanticleers were led by twelfth-year head coach Kelley Green and were members of the Sun Belt Conference.

== Preseason ==
=== Sun Belt Conference Coaches Poll ===
The Sun Belt Conference Coaches Poll was released on February 8, 2021. Coastal Carolina was picked to finish fourth in the Sun Belt Conference with 68 votes.

Coaches poll
Predicted finish	Team	Votes (1st place)
1	Louisiana	100 (10)
2	Troy	87
3	Texas State	72
4	Coastal Carolina	68
4	UT Arlington	68
6	Appalachian State	43
7	Georgia Southern	38
8	South Alabama	36
9	Louisiana-Monroe	22
10	Georgia State	16

=== Preseason All-Sun Belt team ===
- Summer Ellyson (LA, SR, Pitcher)
- Leanna Johnson (TROY, SO, Pitcher)
- Allisa Dalton (LA, SR, Shortstop/3rd Base)
- Katie Webb (TROY, SR, Infielder/1st Base)
- Raina O'Neal (LA, JR, Outfielder)
- Julie Raws (LA, SR, Catcher)
- Courtney Dean (CCU, SR, Outfielder)
- Mekhia Freeman (GASO, SR, Outfielder)
- Korie Kreps (ULM, JR, Outfielder)
- Kaitlyn Alderink (LA, SR, 2nd Base)
- Jade Gortarez (LA, SR, Shortstop/3rd Base)
- Ciara Bryan (LA, SR, Outfielder)
- Kelly Horne (TROY, SO, Infielder/2nd Base)
- Makiya Thomas (CCU, SR, Outfielder/Infielder)
- Tara Oltmann (TXST, SR, Infielder/Shortstop)
- Jayden Mount (ULM, SR, Infielder)
- Katie Lively (TROY, SO, Outfielder)

=== National Softball Signing Day ===
Player	Position	Hometown	Previous Team
Kennedy Ellis	Pitcher	Aynor, South Carolina	Anyor HS
Abigail Jankay	Infielder/Utility	Coeur D'Alene, Idaho	Lake City HS
Madyson Jennings	Catcher	Belton, South Carolina	Belton-Honea Path HS
Nicolette Picone	Pitcher	Uniondale, New York	Kellenberg Memorial HS
Keirstin Roose	3rd Base	Wolcottville, Indiana	Lakeland HS
Madelyn Volpe	Pitcher	Harleysville, Pennsylvania	North Penn HS

== Roster ==
2021 Coastal Carolina Chanticleers roster
Pitchers: 17 Raelee Brabham - Sophomore; 34 Iyanla de Jesus - Sophomore; 99 Kaitlin Beasley-Polko - Senior; Outfielders: 2 Stavi Augur - Senior; 6 Courtney Dean - Senior; 8 Sydney Guess - Junior; 9 Paige Rivas - Sophomore; 11 Peyton Rivas - Sophomore; 14 Madison Hudson - Freshman; 15 Payton Ebersole - Freshman	Catchers: 25 Jordan Thompson - Freshman; 33 Mackenzie Beyer - Junior; Infielders: 00 Kendall Coyle - Junior; 1 Ally Clegg - Senior; 3 Mary Sobataka - Sophomore; 5 Makiya Thomas - Senior; 7 Allison Kreyer - Junior; 24 Abbey Montoya - Junior; 42 Kayla Rosado - Senior; 45 Taylor Sweigart - Senior; 61 Shelbie Summerlin - Sophomore; 68 Riley Zana - Freshman; Utility: 23 Da'Vidria Robinson - Sophomore; 26 Michaela McAuley - Senior

=== Coaching staff ===
2021 Coastal Carolina Chanticleers coaching staff
- Kelley Green – Head coach – 12th year
- Danielle Penner – Associate head coach – 4th year
- Kristin Erb – Assistant head coach – 9th year
- Amandad Daneker – Volunteer assistant coach – 3rd year
- Blake Schultz – Director of operations – 3rd year

== Schedule and results ==
Legend
	Coastal Carolina win
	Coastal Carolina loss
	Postponement/Cancellation/Suspensions
**Bold**	Coastal Carolina team member

2021 Coastal Carolina Chanticleers softball game log
Regular season (21-23)

February (5-5)
Date	Opponent	Rank	Site/stadium	Score	Win	Loss	Save	TV	Attendance	Overall record	SBC record
Kickin' Chicken Classic
Feb. 12	Tennessee		St. John Stadium – Charles Wade-John Lott Field • Conway, SC	Game cancelled due to threat of freezing rain/sleet/snow in Conway							
Feb. 12	Ohio		St. John Stadium – Charles Wade-John Lott Field • Conway, SC	Game cancelled due to threat of freezing rain/sleet/snow in Conway							
Feb. 13	Ohio		St. John Stadium – Charles Wade-John Lott Field • Conway, SC	Game cancelled due to threat of freezing rain/sleet/snow in Conway							
Feb. 13	UConn		St. John Stadium – Charles Wade-John Lott Field • Conway, SC	Game cancelled due to threat of freezing rain/sleet/snow in Conway							
Feb. 14	Ohio		St. John Stadium – Charles Wade-John Lott Field • Conway, SC	Game cancelled due to threat of freezing rain/sleet/snow in Conway							
Battle at the Beach
Feb. 19	East Carolina		St. John Stadium – Charles Wade-John Lott Field • Conway, SC	Game cancelled due to threat of freezing rain/sleet/snow in Conway							
Feb. 19	Saint Francis		St. John Stadium – Charles Wade-John Lott Field • Conway, SC	Game cancelled due to threat of freezing rain/sleet/snow in Conway							
Feb. 20	Buffalo		St. John Stadium – Charles Wade-John Lott Field • Conway, SC	**W** 6-0	**Beasley-Polko** (1-0)	Ally (0-1)	None		70	1-0	
Feb. 20	Saint Francis		St. John Stadium – Charles Wade-John Lott Field • Conway, SC	**L** 3-9	Vesco (1-1)	**DeJesus** (0-1)	None		70	1-1	
Feb. 21	East Carolina		St. John Stadium – Charles Wade-John Lott Field • Conway, SC	**W** 11-3 (5 inn)	**Beasley-Polko** (2-0)	Estes (0-1)	None		70	2-1	
Feb. 21	East Carolina		St. John Stadium – Charles Wade-John Lott Field • Conway, SC	**L** 1-9 (6 inn)	Woodall (3-0)	**Brabham** (0-1)	None		70	2-2	
Feb. 24	at No. 18 South Carolina		Carolina Softball Stadium • Columbia, SC	**L** 0-8 (6 inn)	Powell (1-0)	**Beasley-Polko** (2-1)	None	SECN	200	2-3	
Feb. 24	at No. 18 South Carolina		Carolina Softball Stadium • Columbia, SC	**L** 0-10 (5 inn)	Vaughan (1-0)	**DeJesus** (0-2)	None	SECN	200	2-4	
Chanticleer Showdown
Feb. 26	Lipscomb		St. John Stadium – Charles Wade-John Lott Field • Conway, SC	**L** 3-4	Burke (3-1)	**Beasley-Polko** (2-2)	None		70	2-5	
Feb. 27	Lipscomb		St. John Stadium – Charles Wade-John Lott Field • Conway, SC	**W** 10-9	**Brabham** (1-1)	Barefoot (1-2)	**Zana** (1)		70	3-5	
Feb. 27	Lipscomb		St. John Stadium – Charles Wade-John Lott Field • Conway, SC	**W** 7-2	**DeJesus** (1-1)	Yakubowski (0-2)	None		70	4-5	
Feb. 28	Lipscomb		St. John Stadium – Charles Wade-John Lott Field • Conway, SC	**W** 7-2	**Beasley-Polko** (3-2)	Burke (1-1)	None		70	5-5	

March (3-8)
Date	Opponent	Rank	Site/stadium	Score	Win	Loss	Save	TV	Attendance	Overall record	SBC record
Florida Atlantic Tournament
Mar. 5	at Florida Atlantic		FAU Softball Stadium • Boca Raton, FL	**W** 4-2	**Beasley-Polko** (4-2)	Gobourne (1-4)	**DeJesus** (1)		115	6-5	
Mar. 6	vs. FIU		FAU Softball Stadium • Boca Raton, FL	Cancelled due to inclement weather in Boca Raton							
Mar. 6	vs. No. 10 Kentucky		FAU Softball Stadium • Boca Raton, FL	Cancelled due to inclement weather in Boca Raton							
Mar. 7	vs. Illinois State		FAU Softball Stadium • Boca Raton, FL	**L** 5-12	Ross (1-0)	**Brabham** (1-2)	None			6-6	
Mar. 7	vs. No. 10 Kentucky		FAU Softball Stadium • Boca Raton, FL	**L** 3-12	Stoddard (3-0)	**Beasley-Polko** (4-3)	None			6-7	
Mar. 13	at Louisiana–Monroe		Geo-Surfaces Field at the ULM Softball Complex • Monroe, LA	**L** 3-6	Hulett (3-2)	**Beasley-Polko** (4-4)	None		305	6-8	0-1
Mar. 13	at Louisiana–Monroe		Geo-Surfaces Field at the ULM Softball Complex • Monroe, LA	**L** 4-8	Hulett (4-2)	**De Jesus** (1-3)	None		305	6-9	0-2
Mar. 14	at Louisiana–Monroe		Geo-Surfaces Field at the ULM Softball Complex • Monroe, LA	**W** 2-0	**Beasley-Polko** (5-3)	Giddens (1-2)	None		257	7-9	1-2
Mar. 16	at College of Charleston		Patriots Point Athletic Complex • Charleston, SC	Game postponed due to threat of inclement weather in Charleston							
Mar. 16	at College of Charleston		Patriots Point Athletic Complex • Charleston, SC	Game postponed due to threat of inclement weather in Charleston							
Mar. 19	South Alabama		St. John Stadium – Charles Wade-John Lott Field • Conway, SC	**L** 3-5	Lackie (10-3)	**Beasley-Polko** (5-5)	None		120	7-10	1-3
Mar. 20	South Alabama		St. John Stadium – Charles Wade-John Lott Field • Conway, SC	**L** 4-8	Hughes (1-1)	**De Jesus** (1-4)	None		120	7-11	1-4
Mar. 21	South Alabama		St. John Stadium – Charles Wade-John Lott Field • Conway, SC	**L** 1-11 (5 inns)	Lackie (11-3)	**Beasley-Polko** (5-6)	None		120	7-12	1-5
Mar. 24	at Charleston Southern		CSU Softball Complex • Charleston, SC	**L** 7-8	Heinrich (2-3)	**Brabham** (1-3)	None		60	7-13	
Mar. 24	at Charleston Southern		CSU Softball Complex • Charleston, SC	**W** 7-6	**De Jesus** (2-4)	Eaton (0-4)	None		60	8-13	

April (11–6)
Date	Opponent	Rank	Site/stadium	Score	Win	Loss	Save	TV	Attendance	Overall record	SBC record
Apr. 1	at RV Texas State		Bobcat Softball Complex • San Marcos, TX	**L** 5-6	Mullins (11-2)	**Beasley-Polko** (5-7)	King (2)		263	8-14	1-6
Apr. 2	at RV Texas State		Bobcat Softball Complex • San Marcos, TX	**L** 1-5	King (6-1)	**De Jesus** (2-5)	None		263	8-15	1-7
Apr. 2	at RV Texas State		Bobcat Softball Complex • San Marcos, TX	**L** 2-3	King (7-1)	**Brabham** (1-4)	None		244	8-16	1-8
Apr. 9	Georgia Southern		St. John Stadium – Charles Wade-John Lott Field • Conway, SC	**W** 5-3	**Brabham** (2-5)	Rewis (1-2)	None	ESPN+	125	9-16	2-8
Apr. 10	Georgia Southern		St. John Stadium – Charles Wade-John Lott Field • Conway, SC	'L 1-9 (6 inns)	Richardson (3-4)	**De Jesus** (2-6)	None	ESPN+	125	9-17	2-9
Apr. 10	Georgia Southern		St. John Stadium – Charles Wade-John Lott Field • Conway, SC	**L** 6-7	Waldrep (3-4)	**Brabham** (2-5)	Rewis (1)	ESPN+	124	9-18	2-10
Apr. 13	at College of Charleston		Patriots Point Athletics Complex • Charleston, SC	**W** 14-3 (5 inns)	**Beasley-Polko** (6-7)	Lemire (1-9)	None		64	10-18	
Apr. 13	at College of Charleston		Patriots Point Athletics Complex • Charleston, SC	**W** 14-2 (5 inns)	**Brabham** (3-5)	Burke (1-7)	None		64	11-18	
Apr. 17	at Georgia State		Robert E. Heck Softball Complex • Decatur, GA	**L** 2-3 (9 inns)	Mooney (6-8)	**Beasley-Polko** (6-8)	None		213	11-19	2-11
Apr. 17	at Georgia State		Robert E. Heck Softball Complex • Decatur, GA	**W** 6-3	**Brabham** (4-5)	Doolittle (0-4)	None		213	12-19	3-11
Apr. 18	at Georgia State		Robert E. Heck Softball Complex • Decatur, GA	**W** 8-7	**Beasley-Polko** (7-8)	Freeman (2-3)	None		217	13-19	4-11
Apr. 21	Campbell		St. Johns Stadium – Charles Wade-John Lott Field • Conway, SC	**W** 7-6 (8 inns)	**Beasley-Polko** (8-8)	Barefoot (10-5)	None		125	14-19	
Apr. 21	Campbell		St. Johns Stadium – Charles Wade-John Lott Field • Conway, SC	**W** 6-4	**De Jesus** (3-6)	Richards (5-3)	**Beasley-Polko** (1)		125	15-19	
Apr. 24	UT Arlington		St. John Stadium – Charles Wade-John Lott Field • Conway, SC	**W** 8-5	**Beasley-Polko** (9-8)	Valencia (3-5)	**Brabham** (1)	ESPN+	125	16-19	5-11
Apr. 24	UT Arlington		St. John Stadium – Charles Wade-John Lott Field • Conway, SC	**W** 6-1	**De Jesus** (4-6)	Hines (4-11)	None	ESPN+	125	17-19	6-11
Apr. 25	UT Arlington		St. John Stadium – Charles Wade-John Lott Field • Conway, SC	**W** 5-2	**Brabham** (5-6)	Valencia (3-6)	None	ESPN+	125	18-19	7-11
Apr. 27	at Winthrop		Terry Field • Rock Hill, SC	Game canceled							
Apr. 27	at Winthrop		Terry Field • Rock Hill, SC	Game canceled							
Apr. 28	at UNC Wilmington		Boseman Field • Wilmington, NC	**W** 12-5	**De Jesus** (5-6)	Gamache (2-6)	**Brabham** (2)		73	19-19	

May (2-4)
Date	Opponent	Rank	Site/stadium	Score	Win	Loss	Save	TV	Attendance	Overall record	SBC record
May 1	No. 13 Louisiana		St. John Stadium – Charles Wade-John Lott Field • Conway, SC	**L** 2-7	Lamb (15-4)	**De Jesus** (5-7)	None	ESPN+	125	19-20	7-12
May 1	No. 13 Louisiana		St. John Stadium – Charles Wade-John Lott Field • Conway, SC	**L** 0-7	Ellyson (17-5)	**Beasley-Polko** (9-9)	None	ESPN+	125	19-21	7-13
May 2	No. 13 Louisiana		St. John Stadium – Charles Wade-John Lott Field • Conway, SC	**L** 2-10 (5 inns)	Ellyson (18-5)	**Brabham** (5-6)	None	ESPN+	125	19-22	7-14
May 6	at Appalachian State		Sywassink/Lloyd Family Stadium • Boone, NC	**L** 5-7	Longanecker (14-6)	**De Jesus** (5-8)	Buckner (2)		50	19-23	7-15
May 6	at Appalachian State		Sywassink/Lloyd Family Stadium • Boone, NC	**W** 8-0	**Beasley-Polko** (10-9)	Holland (7-6)	None		50	20-23	8-15
May 7	at Appalachian State		Sywassink/Lloyd Family Stadium • Boone, NC	**W** 12-3 (6 inns)	**Brabham** (6-6)	Buckner (4-4)	None		50	21-23	9-15

Post-Season (0-1)

SBC tournament (0-1)
Date	Opponent	(Seed)/Rank	Site/stadium	Score	Win	Loss	Save	TV	Attendance	Overall record	SBC record
May 11	vs. (9) Louisiana–Monroe	(8)	Troy Softball Complex • Troy, AL	**L** 6-8	Coons (6-4)	**Brabham** (5-9)	Hulett (3)	ESPN+	169	21-24	

Schedule source:

*Rankings are based on the team's current ranking in the NFCA/USA Softball poll.

== Postseason ==
=== Conference accolades ===
- Player of the Year: Ciara Bryan – LA
- Pitcher of the Year: Summer Ellyson – LA
- Freshman of the Year: Sara Vanderford – TXST
- Newcomer of the Year: Ciara Bryan – LA
- Coach of the Year: Gerry Glasco – LA

All Conference First Team

- Ciara Bryan (LA)
- Summer Ellyson (LA)
- Sara Vanderford (TXST)
- Leanna Johnson (TROY)
- Jessica Mullins (TXST)
- Olivia Lackie (USA)
- Kj Murphy (UTA)
- Katie Webb (TROY)
- Jayden Mount (ULM)
- Kandra Lamb (LA)
- Kendall Talley (LA)
- Meredith Keel (USA)
- Tara Oltmann (TXST)
- Jade Sinness (TROY)
- Katie Lively (TROY)

All Conference Second Team

- Kelly Horne (TROY)
- Meagan King (TXST)
- Mackenzie Brasher (USA)
- Bailee Wilson (GASO)
- Makiya Thomas (CCU)
- Kaitlyn Alderink (LA)
- Abby Krzywiecki (USA)
- Kenzie Longanecker (APP)
- Alissa Dalton (LA)
- Julie Rawls (LA)
- Korie Kreps (ULM)
- Kayla Rosado (CCU)
- Justice Milz (LA)
- Gabby Buruato (APP)
- Arieann Bell (TXST)
