= 2021 Appalachian State Mountaineers softball team =

American college softball season

2021 Appalachian State Mountaineers softball
- Conference: Sun Belt Conference
- Record: 27–19 (8–12 SBC)
- Head coach: Shelly Hoerner (4th season)
- Assistant coaches: Shane Showalter; Amanda Fefel
- Home stadium: Sywassink/Lloyd Family Stadium

2021 Sun Belt Conference softball standings
	Conf.				Overall
Team	W		L	PCT	W		L	PCT
No. 15 Louisiana ‍†‍‡‍^{y}	21	–	3	.875	47	–	12	.797
Texas State ‍‍‍^{y}	17	–	6	.739	39	–	14	.736
Troy ‍‍‍^{y}	17	–	6	.739	37	–	17	.685
South Alabama ‍‍‍^{y}	13	–	9	.591	31	–	21	.596
Appalachian State ‍‍‍	8	–	12	.400	27	–	19	.587
Georgia Southern ‍‍‍	9	–	14	.391	17	–	26	.395
UT Arlington ‍‍‍	9	–	14	.391	17	–	34	.333
Coastal Carolina ‍‍‍	9	–	15	.375	21	–	24	.467
Louisiana–Monroe ‍‍‍	6	–	15	.286	17	–	32	.347
Georgia State ‍‍‍	3	–	18	.143	16	–	30	.348
† – Conference champion ‡ – Tournament champion y – Invited to the NCAA tournament As of May 23, 2021; Rankings from NFCA

The 2021 Appalachian State Mountaineers softball team represented Appalachian State University during the 2020 NCAA Division I softball season. The Mountaineers played their home games at Sywassink/Lloyd Family Stadium. The Mountaineers were led by fourth-year head coach Shelly Hoerner and were members of the Sun Belt Conference.

== Preseason ==
=== Sun Belt Conference Coaches Poll ===
The Sun Belt Conference Coaches Poll was released on February 8, 2021. Appalachian State was picked to finish sixth in the Sun Belt Conference with 43 votes.

Coaches poll
Predicted finish	Team	Votes (1st place)
1	Louisiana	100 (10)
2	Troy	87
3	Texas State	72
4	Coastal Carolina	68
4	UT Arlington	68
6	Appalachian State	43
7	Georgia Southern	38
8	South Alabama	36
9	Louisiana-Monroe	22
10	Georgia State	16

=== National Softball Signing Day ===
Player	Position	Hometown	Previous Team
Kathleen Barton	Catcher	Helotes, Texas	Sandra Day O'Connor HS
Kam Caldwell	Shortstop	Bogart, Georgia	Prince Avenue Christian
Katelynn Crowe	Utility	Denver, North Carolina	East Lincoln HS
Kylie LaRousa	Catcher	Harrisburg, North Carolina	Hickory Ridge HS
Kenzi Lyall	Pitcher	Sparta, North Carolina	Alleghany HS
Sejal Neas	Pitcher	Johnson City, Tennessee	Science Hill HS
Kennedy Upshire	Infielder	Rancho Murieta, California	Sheldon HS
Hailey Webb	Infielder/Utility	Antioch, Illinois	Antioch Community HS
Addie Wray	Shortstop	Claremont, North Carolina	Bunker Hill HS

== Roster ==
2021 Appalachian State Mountaineers roster
Pitchers: 1 Kenzie Longanecker - Senior; 2 Taylor Nichols - Junior; 7 Camryn Brazile - Sophomore; 9 Amala Clawson - Freshman; 11 Delani Buckner - Freshman; 13 Sydney Holland - Senior; 24 Lindsey Manhart - Freshman; Outfielders: 4 Emily Parrott - Sophomore; 6 Shelby Cornett - Freshman; 10 Gabby Buruato - Senior; 12 Kayt Houston - Freshman; 15 Claire Carson - Freshman; 16 Mary Pierce Barnes - Junior; 20 Abby Cunningham - Freshman; 22 Kati Waalk - Redshirt Sophomore	Catchers: 18 Taylor Thorp - Redshirt Sophomore; 27 Baylee Morton - Senior; 41 Camryn Jones - Sophomore; Infielders: 3 Keri White - Senior; 5 Caylie Kifer - Senior; 8 Shelbi Tucker - Freshman; 21 Maegan Calandra - Sophomore; 23 Emma Jones - Freshman; 29 Sidney Russell - Senior; Utility: 14 Addison Jones - Sophomore; 19 Allie Sewell - Freshman; 31 Sidney Martin - Freshman

=== Coaching staff ===
2021 Appalachian State Mountaineers coaching staff
- Shelly Hoerner – Head Coach – 4th year
- Shane Showalter – Assistant Head Coach – 4th year
- Amanda Fefel – Assistant Head Coach – 2nd year
- Shanna Smith – Volunteer Assistant Coach – 1st year

== Schedule and results ==
Legend
	Appalachian State win
	Appalachian State loss
	Postponement/Cancellation/Suspensions
**Bold**	Appalachian State team member

2021 Appalachian State Mountaineers softball game log
Regular season (26-17)

February (6-4)
Date	Opponent	Rank	Site/stadium	Score	Win	Loss	Save	TV	Attendance	Overall record	SBC record
Feb. 12	at Charlotte		Sue M. Daughtridge Stadium • Charlotte, NC	**L** 3-4 (8 inn)	Walljasper (1-0)	**Holland** (0-1)	None			0-1	
Feb. 16	at Charlotte		Sue M. Daughtridge Stadium • Charlotte, NC	**W** 12-7	**Holland** (1-1)	Mitchell (0-1)	None			1-1	
Feb. 16	at Charlotte		Sue M. Daughtridge Stadium • Charlotte, NC	**L** 3-5	Walljasper (2-0)	**Buckner** (0-1)	None			1-2	
Feb. 20	at UNC Greensboro		UNCG Softball Stadium • Greensboro, NC	**W** 9-5	**Longanecker** (1-0)	Stiltner (0-2)	None			2-2	
Feb. 21	at UNC Greensboro		UNCG Softball Stadium • Greensboro, NC	**W** 7-5	**Holland** (2-1)	Scott (0-2)	None			3-2	
Feb. 21	at UNC Greensboro		UNCG Softball Stadium • Greensboro, NC	**L** 5-9	Varga (1-0)	**Brazile** (0-1)	None			3-3	
Feb. 27	at UNC Wilmington		Boseman Field • Wilmington, NC	**W** 3-2	**Longanecker** (2-0)	Pate (0-2)	None		115	4-3	
Feb. 27	at UNC Wilmington		Boseman Field • Wilmington, NC	**W** 5-4	**Nicholas** (1-0)	Gamache (0-1)	None		115	5-3	
Feb. 28	at UNC Wilmington		Boseman Field • Wilmington, NC	**L** 2-5	Bjorson (1-0)	**Buckner** (0-1)	None		32	5-4	
Feb. 28	at UNC Wilmington		Boseman Field • Wilmington, NC	**W** 7-1	**Longanecker**	Pearce (0-1)	None		125	6-4	

March (8-6)
Date	Opponent	Rank	Site/stadium	Score	Win	Loss	Save	TV	Attendance	Overall record	SBC record
Mar. 5	at North Carolina A&T		Lady Aggie Softball Complex • Greensboro, NC	**W** 15-1 (5 inns)	**Longanecker** (4-0)	Kirby (0-4)	None		12	7-4	
Mar. 5	at North Carolina A&T		Lady Aggie Softball Complex • Greensboro, NC	**W** 8-4	**Holland** (3-1)	Richards (0-3)	None		17	8-4	
Mar. 7	at North Carolina Central		Thomas Brooks Park • Cary, NC	**W** 8-0 (6 inns)	**Longanecker** (5-0)	Hurley (0-8)	None		75	9-4	
Mar. 7	at North Carolina Central		Thomas Brooks Park • Cary, NC	**W** 17-0 (5 inns)	**Buckner** (1-2)	Barr (0-3)	None			10-4	
Mar. 9	at East Tennessee State		Betty Basler Field • Johnson City, TN	**L** 0-2	Schmidt (3-1)	**Holland** (3-2)	None		160	10-5	
Mar. 9	at East Tennessee State		Betty Basler Field • Johnson City, TN	**W** 7-1	**Longanecker** (6-0)	Boling (1-2)	None		175	11-5	
Mar. 13	at South Alabama		Jaguar Field • Mobile, AL	**L** 0-1	Lackie (8-3)	**Longanecker** (6-1)	None	ESPN+	200	11-6	0-1
Mar. 13	at South Alabama		Jaguar Field • Mobile, AL	**L** 4-7	Hughen (3-3)	**Holland** (3-3)	None	ESPN+	200	11-7	0-2
Mar. 14	at South Alabama		Jaguar Field • Mobile, AL	**L** 0-4	Lackie (9-3)	**Longanecker** (6-2)	None	ESPN+	200	11-8	0-3
Mar. 21	Texas State		Sywassink/Lloyd Family Stadium • Boone, NC	**L** 3-4	King (4-1)	**Longanecker** (6-3)	McCann (1)		50	11-9	0-4
Mar. 21	Texas State		Sywassink/Lloyd Family Stadium • Boone, NC	**L** 3-8	Barrera (1-0)	**Holland** (3-4)	Mullins (2)		50	11-10	0-5
Mar. 23	at Western Carolina		Catamount Softball Complex • Cullowhee, NC	**W** 5-1	**Longanecker** (7-3)	Eilers (3-8)	None	ESPN+	36	12-10	
Mar. 23	at Western Carolina		Catamount Softball Complex • Cullowhee, NC	**W** 4-3 (10 inns)	**Buckner** (2-2)	Rice (2-7)	None	ESPN+	36	13-10	
Mar. 26	Georgia State		Sywassink/Lloyd Family Stadium • Boone, NC	**W** 6-5 (8 inns)	**Longanecker** (8-3)	Doolittle (0-1)	None	ESPN+	50	14-10	1-5
Mar. 28	Georgia State		Sywassink/Lloyd Family Stadium • Boone, NC	Game Cancelled due to threat of inclement weather in Boone							
Mar. 28	Georgia State		Sywassink/Lloyd Family Stadium • Boone, NC	Game Cancelled due to threat of inclement weather in Boone							

April (10–3)
Date	Opponent	Rank	Site/stadium	Score	Win	Loss	Save	TV	Attendance	Overall record	SBC record
Apr. 3	Radford		Sywassink/Lloyd Family Stadium • Boone, NC	**W** 5-2	**Longanecker** (9-3)	Marvin (4-10)	None	ESPN+	50	15-10	
Apr. 3	Radford		Sywassink/Lloyd Family Stadium • Boone, NC	**W** 3-1	**Holland** (4-4)	Dehart (3-2)	None	ESPN+	50	16-10	
Apr. 7	UNC Greensboro		Sywassink/Lloyd Family Stadium • Boone, NC	**W** 4-3	**Longanecker** (10-3)	Scott (8-5)	None	ESPN+	50	17-10	
Apr. 10	Louisiana–Monroe		Sywassink/Lloyd Family Stadium • Boone, NC	**W** 8-2 (6 inns)	**Longanecker** (11-3)	Williams (2-5)	None	ESPN+	50	18-10	2-5
Apr. 10	Louisiana–Monroe		Sywassink/Lloyd Family Stadium • Boone, NC	**W** 1-0	**Holland** (5-4)	Hulett (4-3)	None	ESPN+	50	19-10	3-5
Apr. 11	Louisiana–Monroe		Sywassink/Lloyd Family Stadium • Boone, NC	**W** 1-0 (8 inns)	**Buckner** (3-2)	Hulett (4-4)	None	ESPN+	50	20-10	4-5
Apr. 16	at Georgia Southern		Eagle Field at GS Softball Complex • Statesboro, GA	**L** 3-11 (6 inns)	Garcia (3-4)	**Longanecker** (11-4)	Richardson (1)	ESPN+	135	20-11	4-6
Apr. 16	at Georgia Southern		Eagle Field at GS Softball Complex • Statesboro, GA	**W** 6-3	**Holland** (6-4)	Waldrep (3-5)	**Buckner** (1)	ESPN+	135	21-11	5-6
Apr. 17	at Georgia Southern		Eagle Field at GS Softball Complex • Statesboro, GA	**W** 5-2	**Holland** (7-4)	Feil (0-6)	None	ESPN+	150	22-11	6-6
Apr. 21	East Tennessee State		Sywassink/Lloyd Family Stadium • Boone, NC	**W** 4-3	**Buckner** (4-2)	Schmidt (7-8)	None		50	23-11	
Apr. 21	East Tennessee State		Sywassink/Lloyd Family Stadium • Boone, NC	**W** 8-0 (6 inns)	**Longanecker** (12-4)	Boling (2-3)	None		50	24-11	
Apr. 24	Troy		Sywassink/Lloyd Family Stadium • Boone, NC	Game cancelled							
Apr. 24	Troy		Sywassink/Lloyd Family Stadium • Boone, NC	**L** 2-3	Johnson (18-5)	**Longanecker** (12-5)	None	ESPN+	50	24-12	6-7
Apr. 25	Troy		Sywassink/Lloyd Family Stadium • Boone, NC	**L** 6-8	Baker (6-3)	**Buckner** (4-3)	Johnson (2)	ESPN+	50	24-13	6-8

May (2-4)
Date	Opponent	Rank	Site/stadium	Score	Win	Loss	Save	TV	Attendance	Overall record	SBC record
May 1	at UT Arlington		Allan Saxe Field • Arlington, TX	**L** 0-2	Valencia (4-6)	**Longanecker** (12-6)	Gardiner (4)		156	24-14	6-9
May 1	at UT Arlington		Allan Saxe Field • Arlington, TX	**L** 0-6	Hines (5-11)	**Holland** (7-5)	None		156	24-15	6-10
May 2	at UT Arlington		Allan Saxe Field • Arlington, TX	**W** 2-0	**Longanecker** (13-6)	Henriksen (2-5)	None		156	25-15	7-10
May 6	Coastal Carolina		Sywassink/Lloyd Family Stadium • Boone, NC	**W** 7-5	**Longanecker** (14-6)	De Jesus (5-8)	**Buckner** (2)	ESPN+	50	26-15	8-10
May 6	Coastal Carolina		Sywassink/Lloyd Family Stadium • Boone, NC	**L** 0-8	Beasley-Polko (10-9)	**Holland** (7-6)	None	ESPN+	50	26-16	8-11
May 7	Coastal Carolina		Sywassink/Lloyd Family Stadium • Boone, NC	**L** 3-12 (6 inns)	Brabham (6-6)	**Buckner** (4-4)	None	ESPN+	50	26-17	8-12

Post-Season (1-2)

SBC tournament (1-2)
Date	Opponent	(Seed)/Rank	Site/stadium	Score	Win	Loss	Save	TV	Attendance	Overall record	SBC record
May 12	vs. (4) South Alabama	(5)	Troy Softball Complex • Troy, AL	**L** 0-11 (5 inns)	Lackie (17-9)	**Longanecker** (14-7)	None	ESPN+	218	26-18	
May 13	vs. (10) Georgia State	(5)	Troy Softball Complex • Troy, AL	**W** 2-1	**Holland** (8-6)	Mooney (7-12)	None	ESPN+	104	27-18	
May 14	vs. (4) South Alabama	(5)	Troy Softball Complex • Troy, AL	**L** 1-2	Hardy (3-2)	**Longanecker** (14-8)	Lackie (4)	ESPN+	147	27-19	

Schedule source:

*Rankings are based on the team's current ranking in the NFCA/USA Softball poll.

== Postseason ==
=== Conference accolades ===
- Player of the Year: Ciara Bryan – LA
- Pitcher of the Year: Summer Ellyson – LA
- Freshman of the Year: Sara Vanderford – TXST
- Newcomer of the Year: Ciara Bryan – LA
- Coach of the Year: Gerry Glasco – LA

All Conference First Team

- Ciara Bryan (LA)
- Summer Ellyson (LA)
- Sara Vanderford (TXST)
- Leanna Johnson (TROY)
- Jessica Mullins (TXST)
- Olivia Lackie (USA)
- Kj Murphy (UTA)
- Katie Webb (TROY)
- Jayden Mount (ULM)
- Kandra Lamb (LA)
- Kendall Talley (LA)
- Meredith Keel (USA)
- Tara Oltmann (TXST)
- Jade Sinness (TROY)
- Katie Lively (TROY)

All Conference Second Team

- Kelly Horne (TROY)
- Meagan King (TXST)
- Mackenzie Brasher (USA)
- Bailee Wilson (GASO)
- Makiya Thomas (CCU)
- Kaitlyn Alderink (LA)
- Abby Krzywiecki (USA)
- Kenzie Longanecker (APP)
- Alissa Dalton (LA)
- Julie Rawls (LA)
- Korie Kreps (ULM)
- Kayla Rosado (CCU)
- Justice Milz (LA)
- Gabby Buruato (APP)
- Arieann Bell (TXST)
