= 2021 South Alabama Jaguars softball team =

American college softball season

2021 South Alabama Jaguars softball

Gainesville Regional appearance
- Conference: Sun Belt Conference
- Record: 31–21 (13–9 SBC)
- Head coach: Becky Clark (15th season)
- Assistant coaches: Kristina McCain; Hannah Campbell
- Home stadium: Jaguar Field

2021 Sun Belt Conference softball standings
	Conf.				Overall
Team	W		L	PCT	W		L	PCT
No. 15 Louisiana ‍†‍‡‍^{y}	21	–	3	.875	47	–	12	.797
Texas State ‍‍‍^{y}	17	–	6	.739	39	–	14	.736
Troy ‍‍‍^{y}	17	–	6	.739	37	–	17	.685
South Alabama ‍‍‍^{y}	13	–	9	.591	31	–	21	.596
Appalachian State ‍‍‍	8	–	12	.400	27	–	19	.587
Georgia Southern ‍‍‍	9	–	14	.391	17	–	26	.395
UT Arlington ‍‍‍	9	–	14	.391	17	–	34	.333
Coastal Carolina ‍‍‍	9	–	15	.375	21	–	24	.467
Louisiana–Monroe ‍‍‍	6	–	15	.286	17	–	32	.347
Georgia State ‍‍‍	3	–	18	.143	16	–	30	.348
† – Conference champion ‡ – Tournament champion y – Invited to the NCAA tournament As of May 23, 2021; Rankings from NFCA

The 2021 South Alabama Jaguars softball team represented the University of South Alabama during the 2021 NCAA Division I softball season. The Jaguars played their home games at Jaguar Field. The Jaguars were led by fifteenth-year head coach Becky Clark and were members of the Sun Belt Conference.

== Preseason ==
=== Sun Belt Conference Coaches Poll ===
The Sun Belt Conference Coaches Poll was released on February 8, 2021. South Alabama was picked to finish eighth in the Sun Belt Conference with 36 votes.

Coaches poll
Predicted finish	Team	Votes (1st place)
1	Louisiana	100 (10)
2	Troy	87
3	Texas State	72
4	Coastal Carolina	68
4	UT Arlington	68
6	Appalachian State	43
7	Georgia Southern	38
8	South Alabama	36
9	Louisiana-Monroe	22
10	Georgia State	16

=== National Softball Signing Day ===
Player	Position	Hometown	Previous Team
Erin McGlothlin	Outfielder	Homestead, Florida	Keys Gate Charter
Rachel Everett	Pitcher	Hartland, Michigan	Hartland HS
Stephanie Gonzalez	Utility	Miramar, Florida	Pembroke Pines Charter HS
Gabby Stringer	Infielder	Mobile, Alabama	Faith Academy
Shelby Garrett	Infielder	Frostproof, Florida	Frostproof Middle-Senior HS

== Roster ==
2021 South Alabama Jaguars roster
Pitchers: 1 Kelsie Rivers – junior; 4 Allie Hughen – senior; 16 Lexi Hutchins – sophomore; 28 Kaitlyn Hughes – freshman; 35 Jenna Hardy – sophomore; 99 Olivia Lackie – freshman; Outfielders: 7 Caroline Nichols – junior; 12 Shelby Sloan – sophomore; 14 Bailey Welch – freshman; 18 Mackenzie Brasher – sophomore; 24 Amanda Flynn – senior; 34 Victoria Ortiz - Redshirt Sophomore	Catchers: 10 Kassidy Wilcox – sophomore; Infielders: 0 Meredith Keel – junior; 5 Camryn McLemore – sophomore; 9 Jordyn Calderon – junior; 17 Abby Krzywiecki – senior; 19 Kennedy Cronan – junior; 20 Holly Stewart – junior; 23 Belle Wolfenden – junior; 30 Katelyn Gruich – senior; Utilitys: 3 Emma Kropp – sophomore; 6 Abby Allen – freshman; 11 Kamdyn Kvistad – senior; 21 Hannah Ogea – freshman; 22 Breanna Barlow – sophomore; 25 Janeah Finney – junior

=== Coaching staff ===
2021 South Alabama Jaguars coaching staff
- Becky Clark – Head coach – 15th year
- Kristina McCain – Assistant Head coach – 11th year
- Hannah Campbell – Assistant Head coach – 6th year
- Meredith Tanner – Director of Softball Operations – 10th year

== Schedule and results ==
Legend
	South Alabama win
	South Alabama loss
	Postponement/Cancellation/Suspensions
**Bold**	South Alabama team member

2021 South Alabama Jaguars Softball Game Log
Regular season (26-17)

February (7-5)
Date	Opponent	Rank	Site/stadium	Score	Win	Loss	Save	TV	Attendance	Overall record	SBC record
Red & Black Showcase
Feb. 12	at No. 14 Georgia	RV	Jack Turner Stadium • Athens, GA	**L** 3-8	Avant (1-0)	**Lackie** (0-1)	None			0-1	
Feb. 12	at No. 14 Georgia	RV	Jack Turner Stadium • Athens, GA	**W** 9-8	**Hardy** (1-0)	Cutting (0-1)	**Lackie** (1)		107	1-1	
Feb. 13	vs. Virginia	RV	Jack Turner Stadium • Athens, GA	**L** 4-9	Harris (1-1)	**Lackie** (0-2)	None		84	1-2	
Feb. 14	vs. Virginia	RV	Jack Turner Stadium • Athens, GA	Game cancelled due to threat of freezing rain/sleet/snow in Athens							
Jaguar Classic
Feb. 19	Murray State		Jaguar Field • Mobile, AL	**W** 4-2	**Lackie** (1-2)	Veber (0-3)	None		200	2-2	
Feb. 19	Lipscomb		Jaguar Field • Mobile, AL	**W** 6-0	**Hughen** (1-0)	Yakubowski (0-1)	None		200	3-2	
Feb. 20	Murray State		Jaguar Field • Mobile, AL	**L** 0-1	James (2-2)	**Hughen** (1-1)	None		200	3-3	
Feb. 20	Butler		Jaguar Field • Mobile, AL	**W** 7-5	**Lackie** (2-2)	Ricketts (2-2)	None	ESPN+	200	4-3	
Feb. 21	Lipscomb		Jaguar Field • Mobile, AL	**L** 1-2	Burke (1-1)	**Hughen** (1-2)	None	ESPN+	200	4-4	
South Alabama Invitational
Feb. 26	No. 20 Missouri		Jaguar Field • Mobile, AL	**L** 3-8	Nichols (2-1)	**Hardy** (1-1)	None	ESPN+	200	4-5	
Feb. 27	Middle Tennessee		Jaguar Field • Mobile, AL	**W** 2-0	**Lackie** (3-2)	Baldwin (1-2)	None	ESPN+	200	5-5	
Feb. 27	Southern Illinois–Edwardsville		Jaguar Field • Mobile, AL	**W** 6-5	**Lackie** (4-2)	Baalman (0-2)	None	ESPN+	200	6-5	
Feb. 28	Northwestern State		Jaguar Field • Mobile, AL	**W** 6-1	**Lackie** (5-2)	Seely (0-1)	None	ESPN+	200	7-5	

March (10-6)
Date	Opponent	Rank	Site/stadium	Score	Win	Loss	Save	TV	Attendance	Overall record	SBC record
Easton T-Town Showdown
Mar. 5	vs. Northern Iowa		Rhoads Stadium • Tuscaloosa, AL	**W** 9-2	**Lackie** (6-2)	Sanders (0-1)	None		183	8-5	
Mar. 5	vs. Northern Iowa		Rhoads Stadium • Tuscaloosa, AL	**L** 1-5	Packard (4-1)	**Hughen** (1-3)	None		218	8-6	
Mar. 6	vs. Kent State		Rhoads Stadium • Tuscaloosa, AL	**L** 0-2	Lebeau (2-2)	**Lackie** (6-3)	None		103	8-7	
Mar. 6	vs. Kent State		Rhoads Stadium • Tuscaloosa, AL	**W** 10-3	**Hughen** (2-3)	Sherman (0-2)	**Hughes** (1)		203	9-7	
Mar. 7	at No. 3 Alabama		Rhoads Stadium • Tuscaloosa, AL	**W** 1-0	**Lackie** (7-3)	Fouts (7-1)	None		1,121	10-7	
Mar. 10	at Ole Miss	RV	Ole Miss Softball Complex • Oxford, MS	**L** 5-6	Borgen (5-0)	**Hughes** (0-1)	None		178	10-8	
Mar. 13	Appalachian State	RV	Jaguar Field • Mobile, AL	**W** 1-0	**Lackie** (8-3)	Longanecker (6-1)	None	ESPN+	200	11-8	1-0
Mar. 13	Appalachian State	RV	Jaguar Field • Mobile, AL	**W** 7-4	**Hughen** (3-3)	Holland (3-3)	None	ESPN+	200	12-8	2-0
Mar. 14	Appalachian State	RV	Jaguar Field • Mobile, AL	**W** 4-0	**Lackie** (9-3)	Longanecker (6-2)	None	ESPN+	200	13-8	3-0
Mar. 17	Southern Miss	RV	Jaguar Field • Mobile, AL	Game cancelled due to threat of inclement weather in Mobile							
Mar. 20	at Coastal Carolina	RV	St. Johns Stadium – Charles Wade-John Lott Field • Conway, SC	**W** 5-3	**Lackie** (10-3)	Beasley-Polko (5-5)	None		120	14-8	4-0
Mar. 20	at Coastal Carolina	RV	St. Johns Stadium – Charles Wade-John Lott Field • Conway, SC	**W** 8-4	**Hughes** (1-1)	De Jesus (1-4)	None		120	15-8	5-0
Mar. 21	at Coastal Carolina	RV	St. Johns Stadium – Charles Wade-John Lott Field • Conway, SC	**W** 11-1 (5 inns)	**Lackie** (11-3)	Beasley-Polko (5-6)	None		120	16-8	6-0
Mar. 24	No. 13 LSU	RV	Jaguar Field • Mobile, AL	Game cancelled							
Mar. 26	at No. 16 Louisiana	RV	Yvette Girouard Field at Lamson Park • Lafayette, LA	**L** 0-1	Ellyson (6-4)	**Lackie** (11-4)	None		282	16-9	6-1
Mar. 27	at No. 16 Louisiana	RV	Yvette Girouard Field at Lamson Park • Lafayette, LA	**L** 0-1	Lamb (8-2)	**Hughen** (3-4)	None		291	16-10	6-2
Mar. 28	at No. 16 Louisiana	RV	Yvette Girouard Field at Lamson Park • Lafayette, LA	**L** 0-6	Lamb (9-2)	**Lackie** (11-5)	None		304	16-11	6-3
Mar. 31	McNeese State	RV	Jaguar Field • Mobile, AL	**W** 1-0	**Hughen** (4-4)	Flores (4-6)	**Lackie** (2)	ESPN+	200	17-11	

April (8–3)
Date	Opponent	Rank	Site/stadium	Score	Win	Loss	Save	TV	Attendance	Overall record	SBC record
Apr. 6	Nicholls		Jaguar Field • Mobile, AL	**W** 10-2 (6 inns)	**Hughen** (5-4)	Westbrook (2-5)	None	ESPN+	200	18-11	
Apr. 7	at RV Troy		Troy Softball Complex • Troy, AL	**L** 0-3	Johnson (15-3)	**Lackie** (11-6)	None		212	18-12	6-4
Apr. 10	at No. 25 Texas State		Bobcat Softball Stadium • San Marcos, TX	**W** 3-1	**Hughen** (6-4)	Mullins (12-3)	None		243	19-12	7-4
Apr. 10	at No. 25 Texas State		Bobcat Softball Stadium • San Marcos, TX	**W** 1-0	**Lackie** (12-6)	King (7-2)	None		307	20-12	8-4
Apr. 11	at No. 25 Texas State		Bobcat Softball Stadium • San Marcos, TX	**W** 7-4	**Hughes** (2-1)	McCann (4-1)	**Lackie** (3)		307	21-12	9-4
Apr. 18	UT Arlington	RV	Jaguar Field • Mobile, AL	**W** 3-1	**Lackie** (13-6)	Valencia (3-4)	None	ESPN+	200	22-12	10-4
Apr. 18	UT Arlington	RV	Jaguar Field • Mobile, AL	**L** 4-7	Hines (4-9)	**Hughes** (2-2)	Valencia (1)	ESPN+	200	22-13	10-5
Apr. 20	at Southern Miss		Jaguar Field • Mobile, AL	**W** 4-2	**Lackie** (14-6)	Pierce (2-8)	None			23-13	
Apr. 24	Louisiana–Monroe		Jaguar Field • Mobile, AL	Game cancelled							
Apr. 24	Louisiana–Monroe		Jaguar Field • Mobile, AL	**W** 4-2	**Lackie** (15-6)	Hulett (4-6)	None	ESPN+	200	24-13	11-5
Apr. 25	Louisiana–Monroe		Jaguar Field • Mobile, AL	**W** 5-2	**Hardy** (2-1)	Chavarria (1-9)	None	ESPN+	200	25-13	12-5
Apr. 30	at Georgia Southern		Eagle Field at GS Softball Complex • Statesboro, GA	**L** 1-9	Garcia (5-6)	**Lackie** (15-7)	None		126	25-14	12-6

May (1-3)
Date	Opponent	Rank	Site/stadium	Score	Win	Loss	Save	TV	Attendance	Overall record	SBC record
May 1	at Georgia Southern		Eagle Field at GS Softball Complex • Statesboro, GA	**L** 3-4	Rewis (2-2)	**Hardy** (2-2)	None		165	25-15	12-7
May 2	at Georgia Southern		Eagle Field at GS Softball Complex • Statesboro, GA	**L** 0-2	Garcia (6-6)	**Lackie** (15-8)	None		145	25-16	12-8
May 7	Troy		Jaguar Field • Mobile, AL	**L** 0-1	Johnson (19-6)	**Lackie** (15-9)	None	ESPN+	200	25-17	12-9
May 8	Troy		Jaguar Field • Mobile, AL	**W** 7-6	**Lackie** (16-9)	Johnson (19-7)	None	ESPN+	200	26-17	13-9

Postseason (5-4)

SBC Tournament (4-2)
Date	Opponent	(Seed)/Rank	Site/stadium	Score	Win	Loss	Save	TV	Attendance	Overall record	SBC record
May 12	vs. (5) Appalachian State	(4)	Troy Softball Complex • Troy, AL	**W** 11-0 (5 inns)	**Lackie** (17-9)	Longanecker (14-7)	None	ESPN+	218	27-17	
May 13	vs. (1)/No. 14 Louisiana	(4)	Troy Softball Complex • Troy, AL	**L** 3-10	Ellyson (21-6)	**Lackie** (17-10)	None	ESPN+	167	27-18	
May 14	vs. (5) Appalachian State	(4)	Troy Softball Complex • Troy, AL	**W** 2-1	**Hardy** (3-2)	Longanecker (14-8)	**Lackie** (4)	ESPN+	147	28-18	
May 14	vs. (3) Troy	(4)	Troy Softball Complex • Troy, AL	**W** 10-6	**Hardy** (4-2)	Blasingame (6-1)	None	ESPN+	432	29-18	
May 15	vs. (2) Texas State	(4)	Troy Softball Complex • Troy, AL	**W** 4-3 (8 inns)	**Lackie** (18-10)	McCann (4-2)	None	ESPN+	321	30-18	
May 15	vs. (1)/No. 14 Louisiana	(4)	Troy Softball Complex • Troy, AL	**L** 3-15 (5 inns)	Ellyson (23-6)	**Hardy** (4-3)	None	ESPN+	279	30-19	

NCAA Division I softball tournament (1-2)
Date	Opponent	(Seed)/Rank	Site/stadium	Score	Win	Loss	Save	TV	Attendance	Overall record	Tournament record
Gainesville Regionals
May 21	vs. (2) Baylor	(3)	Katie Seashole Pressly Softball Stadium • Gainesville, FL	**W** 2-0	**Lackie** (19-10)	Rodoni (11-12)	None	ESPN3	1,569	31-19	1-0
May 22	vs. (1)/No. 4 Florida	(3)	Katie Seashole Pressly Softball Stadium • Gainesville, FL	**L** 0-10	Lugo (17-2)	**Lackie** (19-11)	None	ESPN3	1,886	31-20	1-1
May 22	vs. (4) South Florida	(3)	Katie Seashole Pressly Softball Stadium • Gainesville, FL	**L** 0-1	Corrick (24-8)	**Lackie** (19-12)	None	ESPN3	1,886	31-21	1-2

Schedule source:

*Rankings are based on the team's current ranking in the NFCA/USA Softball poll.

== Gainesville Regional ==
Gainesville Regional Teams
(1) Florida Gators	(2) Baylor Lady Bears	(3) South Alabama Jaguars	(4) South Florida Bulls

First Round
Baylor	0
South Alabama	2
South Florida	0
4	Florida	1
Lower round 1
Baylor	0
South Florida	5

Semi-Finals
South Alabama	0
4	Florida	10
Lower final
South Alabama	0
South Florida	1

Finals
4	Florida	8	–
South Alabama	0	–

== Postseason ==
=== Conference accolades ===
- Player of the Year: Ciara Bryan – LA
- Pitcher of the Year: Summer Ellyson – LA
- Freshman of the Year: Sara Vanderford – TXST
- Newcomer of the Year: Ciara Bryan – LA
- Coach of the Year: Gerry Glasco – LA

All Conference First Team

- Ciara Bryan (LA)
- Summer Ellyson (LA)
- Sara Vanderford (TXST)
- Leanna Johnson (TROY)
- Jessica Mullins (TXST)
- Olivia Lackie (USA)
- Kj Murphy (UTA)
- Katie Webb (TROY)
- Jayden Mount (ULM)
- Kandra Lamb (LA)
- Kendall Talley (LA)
- Meredith Keel (USA)
- Tara Oltmann (TXST)
- Jade Sinness (TROY)
- Katie Lively (TROY)

All Conference Second Team

- Kelly Horne (TROY)
- Meagan King (TXST)
- Mackenzie Brasher (USA)
- Bailee Wilson (GASO)
- Makiya Thomas (CCU)
- Kaitlyn Alderink (LA)
- Abby Krzywiecki (USA)
- Kenzie Longanecker (APP)
- Alissa Dalton (LA)
- Julie Rawls (LA)
- Korie Kreps (ULM)
- Kayla Rosado (CCU)
- Justice Milz (LA)
- Gabby Buruato (APP)
- Arieann Bell (TXST)

== Rankings ==
Ranking movements Legend: ██ Increase in ranking ██ Decrease in ranking — = Not ranked RV = Received votes
	Week																
Poll	Pre	1	2	3	4	5	6	7	8	9	10	11	12	13	14	15	Final
NFCA / USA Today	RV	—	—	—	RV	RV	RV	—	—	RV	—	—					
Softball America	—	—	—	—	—	—	—	—	—	—	—	—					
ESPN.com/USA Softball	—	—	—	—	—	—	—	—	—	—	—	—					
D1Softball	—	—	—	—	—	—	—	—	—	—	—	—					
