= 2021 Troy Trojans softball team =

American college softball season

2021 Troy Trojans softball

Tuscaloosa Regionals appearance
- Conference: Sun Belt Conference
- Record: 37–17 (17–6 SBC)
- Head coach: Beth Mullins (7th season)
- Assistant coaches: Taylor Smartt; Holly Ward
- Home stadium: Troy Softball Complex

2021 Sun Belt Conference softball standings
	Conf.				Overall
Team	W		L	PCT	W		L	PCT
No. 15 Louisiana ‍†‍‡‍^{y}	21	–	3	.875	47	–	12	.797
Texas State ‍‍‍^{y}	17	–	6	.739	39	–	14	.736
Troy ‍‍‍^{y}	17	–	6	.739	37	–	17	.685
South Alabama ‍‍‍^{y}	13	–	9	.591	31	–	21	.596
Appalachian State ‍‍‍	8	–	12	.400	27	–	19	.587
Georgia Southern ‍‍‍	9	–	14	.391	17	–	26	.395
UT Arlington ‍‍‍	9	–	14	.391	17	–	34	.333
Coastal Carolina ‍‍‍	9	–	15	.375	21	–	24	.467
Louisiana–Monroe ‍‍‍	6	–	15	.286	17	–	32	.347
Georgia State ‍‍‍	3	–	18	.143	16	–	30	.348
† – Conference champion ‡ – Tournament champion y – Invited to the NCAA tournament As of May 23, 2021; Rankings from NFCA

The 2021 Troy Trojans softball team represented Troy University during the 2021 NCAA Division I softball season. The Trojans played their home games at Troy Softball Complex. The Trojans were led by seventh-year head coach Beth Mullins and were members of the Sun Belt Conference.

== Preseason ==
=== Sun Belt Conference Coaches Poll ===
The Sun Belt Conference Coaches Poll was released on February 8, 2021. Troy was picked to finish second in the Sun Belt Conference with 87 votes.

Coaches poll
Predicted finish	Team	Votes (1st place)
1	Louisiana	100 (10)
2	Troy	87
3	Texas State	72
4	Coastal Carolina	68
4	UT Arlington	68
6	Appalachian State	43
7	Georgia Southern	38
8	South Alabama	36
9	Louisiana-Monroe	22
10	Georgia State	16

=== Preseason All-Sun Belt team ===
- Summer Ellyson (LA, SR, Pitcher)
- Leanna Johnson (TROY, SO, Pitcher)
- Allisa Dalton (LA, SR, Shortstop/3rd Base)
- Katie Webb (TROY, SR, Infielder/1st Base)
- Raina O'Neal (LA, JR, Outfielder)
- Julie Raws (LA, SR, Catcher)
- Courney Dean (CCU, SR, Outfielder)
- Mekhia Freeman (GASO, SR, Outfielder)
- Korie Kreps (ULM, JR, Outfielder)
- Kaitlyn Alderink (LA, SR, 2nd Base)
- Jade Gortarez (LA, SR, Shortstop/3rd Base)
- Ciara Bryan (LA, SR, Outfielder)
- Kelly Horne (TROY, SO, Infielder/2nd Base)
- Makiya Thomas (CCU, SR, Outfielder/Infielder)
- Tara Oltmann (TXST, SR, Infielder/Shortstop)
- Jayden Mount (ULM, SR, Infielder)
- Katie Lively (TROY, SO, Outfielder)

=== National Softball Signing Day ===
Player	Position	Hometown	Previous Team
Brookelyn Cannon	Pitcher	Hoover, Alabama	Hoover HS
Aayanah Hughes	Infielder	McDonough, Georgia	Union Grove HS
Crystal Maze	Infielder	Trussville, Alabama	Hewitt Trussville HS
Taylor McKinney	Outfielder	Montgomery, Alabama	Macon East Academy
Emma Grace Walker	Outfielder	Kennesaw, Georgia	Harrison HS

== Roster ==
2021 Troy Trojans roster
Pitchers: 3 Libby Baker – freshman; 10 Leanna Johnson – sophomore; 21 Brianna Bailey – sophomore; 23 Kynsley Rae Blasingame – senior; 26 Haley Postell - Redshirt Freshman; Outfielders: 1 Tate Moseley - Redshirt Freshman; 2 Anslee Finch – freshman; 9 Jade Sinness – freshman; 25 Katie Lively – sophomore	Catchers: 12 Jill Robinson – freshman; 17 Katelynn de Leon – freshman; 14 Candela Figueroa – junior; Infielders: 5 Meagan Patterson – freshman; 6 Kaylee Chapman – sophomore; 8 Ashlan Ard – freshman; 11 Audra Thompson – freshman; 18 Adia Polk – sophomore; 22 Logan Calhoun - Redshirt Junior\; 24 Katie Webb – senior; 27 Mia Jenkins – freshman; 31 Kelly Horne – sophomore; 34 Kennedi Gaton – freshman

=== Coaching staff ===
2021 Troy Trojans coaching staff
- Beth Mullins – Head coach – 7th year
- Taylor Smartt – Assistant Head coach – 6th year
- Holly Ward – Assistant Head coach – 2nd year
- Kristy Lawrence – Director of Operations – 10th year

== Schedule and results ==
Legend
	Troy win
	Troy loss
	Postponement/Cancellation/Suspensions
**Bold**	Troy team member

2021 Troy Trojans softball game log
Regular season (34-13)

February (12-3)
Date	Opponent	Rank	Site/stadium	Score	Win	Loss	Save	TV	Attendance	Overall record	SBC record
Trojan Classic
Feb. 12	Ole Miss		Troy Softball Complex • Troy, AL	**W** 5-2	**Johnson** (1-0)	Tillman (0-1)	None		180	1-0	
Feb. 12	UAB		Troy Softball Complex • Troy, AL	**W** 8-0	**Baker** (1-0)	Kachel (0-1)	None		122	2-0	
Feb. 13	Belmont		Troy Softball Complex • Troy, AL	**W** 3-1	**Johnson** (2-0)	Clesi (0-1)	None		143	3-0	
Feb. 14	Belmont		Troy Softball Complex • Troy, AL	**W** 8-0	**Bailey** (1-0)	Clesi (0-2)	None		129	4-0	
Feb. 17	RV Liberty		Troy Softball Complex • Troy, AL	**L** 1-3	Keeney (3-0)	**Johnson** (2-1)	None		65	4-1	
Troy Invitational
Feb. 19	Western Carolina		Troy Softball Complex • Troy, AL	**W** 9-1	**Blasingame** (0-1)	Eilers (1-2)	None		57	5-1	
Feb. 19	Mercer		Troy Softball Complex • Troy, AL	**W** 12-4	**Bailey** (2-0)	Byrd (0-1)	**Johnson** (1)		108	6-1	
Feb. 20	Western Carolina		Troy Softball Complex • Troy, AL	**W** 4-0	**Baker** (2-0)	Eilers (1-2)	None		132	7-1	
Feb. 21	Mercer		Troy Softball Complex • Troy, AL	**W** 9-1	**Johnson** (3-1)	Donner (1-2)	None		167	8-1	
Feb. 24	Samford		Troy Softball Complex • Troy, AL	**W** 3-2	**Johnson** (4-1)	Barnett (1-1)	None	ESPN+	87	9-1	
Feb. 24	Samford		Troy Softball Complex • Troy, AL	**W** 7-1	**Johnson** (5-1)	Robertson (0-1)	None	ESPN+	47	10-1	
Crimson Tide Classic
Feb. 26	vs. North Carolina		Rhoads Stadium • Tuscaloosa, AL	**W** 2-0	Johnson' (6-1)	George (1-2)	None		158	11-1	
Feb. 26	vs. North Carolina		Rhoads Stadium • Tuscaloosa, AL	**L** 2-8	Pickett (4-0)	**Baker** (2-1)	None		123	11-2	
Feb. 27	vs. Memphis		Rhoads Stadium • Tuscaloosa, AL	**W** 6-2	**Johnson** (7-1)	Siems (0-2)	None		211	12-2	
Feb. 27	vs. Memphis		Rhoads Stadium • Tuscaloosa, AL	**W** 6-1	**Baker** (3-1)	Ellett (0-4)	None		103	13-2	
Feb. 28	at No. 4 Alabama		Rhoads Stadium • Tuscaloosa, AL	**L** 0-2	Kilfoyl (6-0)	**Johnson** (7-2)	None		1,121	13-3	

March (9-3)
Date	Opponent	Rank	Site/stadium	Score	Win	Loss	Save	TV	Attendance	Overall record	SBC record
Tiger Invitational
Mar. 4	at No. 24 Auburn	RV	Jane B. Moore Field • Auburn, AL	**L** 1-8	Lowe (3-0)	**Bailey** (2-1)	None		370	13-4	
Mar. 5	vs. Southeastern Louisiana	RV	Jane B. Moore Field • Auburn, AL	**W** 9-6	**Johnson** (8-2)	Comeaux (1-3)	None		370	14-4	
Mar. 5	vs. Southeastern Louisiana	RV	Jane B. Moore Field • Auburn, AL	**W** 9-6	**Blasingame** (2-0)	Zumo (6-2)	None		370	15-4	
Mar. 6	vs. Southern Miss	RV	Jane B. Moore Field • Auburn, AL	**W** 5-4	**Blasingame** (3-0)	Pierce (2-3)	None		370	16-4	
Mar. 6	vs. Southern Miss	RV	Jane B. Moore Field • Auburn, AL	**L** 3-4	Pierce (3-2)	**Baker** (3-2)	None		370	16-5	
Mar. 10	No. 21 Auburn		Troy Softball Complex • Troy, AL	**L** 0-3	Lowe (6-0)	**Johnson** (8-3)	None	ESPN+	250	116-6	
Mar. 13	at UT Arlington		Allan Saxe Field • Arlington, TX	**W** 5-0	**Johnson** (9-3)	Bumpurs (1-5)	None		156	17-6	1-0
Mar. 13	at UT Arlington		Allan Saxe Field • Arlington, TX	**W** 4-1	**Baker** (4-1)	Hines (1-6)	None		156	18-6	2-0
Mar. 14	at UT Arlington		Allan Saxe Field • Arlington, TX	**W** 10-2 (6 inns)	**Johnson** (10-3)	Valencia (0-1)	None		156	19-6	3-0
Mar. 19	at Georgia State		Robert E. Heck Softball Complex • Decatur, GA	**W** 12-0 (5 inns)	**Johnson** (11-3)	Mooney (4-4)	None		253	20-6	4-0
Mar. 20	at Georgia State		Robert E. Heck Softball Complex • Decatur, GA	**W** 11-6	**Blasingame** (4-0)	Banks (2-2)	None		255	21-6	5-0
Mar. 21	at Georgia State		Robert E. Heck Softball Complex • Decatur, GA	**W** 7-1	**Johnson** (12-3)	Buck (3-2)	None		243	22-6	6-0
Lady Vol Challenge
Mar. 27	vs. Furman		Sherri Parker Lee Stadium • Knoxville, TN	Cancelled due to inclement weather in Knoxville							
Mar. 27	at No. 21 Tennessee		Sherri Parker Lee Stadium • Knoxville, TN	Cancelled due to inclement weather in Knoxville							
Mar. 28	vs. Furman		Sherri Parker Lee Stadium • Knoxville, TN	Cancelled due to inclement weather in Knoxville							
Mar. 28	at No. 21 Tennessee		Sherri Parker Lee Stadium • Knoxville, TN	Cancelled due to inclement weather in Knoxville							
Mar. 31	at UAB		Mary Bowers Field • Birmingham, AL	Game Postponed							

April (10–5)
Date	Opponent	Rank	Site/stadium	Score	Win	Loss	Save	TV	Attendance	Overall record	SBC record
Apr. 2	Georgia Southern		Troy Softball Complex • Troy, AL	**W** 5-0	**Johnson** (13-3)	Richardson (2-4)	None	ESPN+	150	23-6	7-0
Apr. 2	Georgia Southern		Troy Softball Complex • Troy, AL	**W** 4-0	**Brianna** (3-1)	Waldrep (2-4)	None	ESPN+	114	24-6	8-0
Apr. 3	Georgia Southern		Troy Softball Complex • Troy, AL	**W** 9-0	**Johnson** (13-3)	Feil (0-5)	None	ESPN+	134	25-6	9-0
Apr. 6	Alabama State	RV	Troy Softball Complex • Troy, AL	Game Postponed							
Apr. 7	South Alabama	RV	Troy Softball Complex • Troy, AL	**W** 3-0	**Johnson** (15-3)	Lackie (11-6)	None	ESPN+	212	26-6	10-0
Apr. 9	No. 14 Louisiana	RV	Troy Softball Complex • Troy, AL	**L** 2-5	Ellyson (12-4)	**Johnson** (15-4)	None	ESPN+	192	26-7	10-1
Apr. 10	No. 14 Louisiana	RV	Troy Softball Complex • Troy, AL	**L** 7-8	Lamb (14-2)	**Bailey** (3-2)	Ellyson (2)	ESPN+	135	26-8	10-2
Apr. 11	No. 14 Louisiana	RV	Troy Softball Complex • Troy, AL	**L** 2-10 (6 inns)	Ellyson (13-4)	**Baker** (4-3)	None	ESPN+	81	26-9	10-3
Apr. 14	at UAB	RV	Mary Bowers Field • Birmingham, AL	Game postponed due to threat of inclement weather in Birmingham							
Apr. 17	at Louisiana–Monroe	RV	Geo-Surfaces Field at the ULM Softball Complex • Monroe, LA	**W** 13-2 (5 inns)	**Johnson** (16-4)	Coons (3-4)	None		98	27-9	11-3
Apr. 17	at Louisiana–Monroe	RV	Geo-Surfaces Field at the ULM Softball Complex • Monroe, LA	**W** 10-6	**Johnson** (16-4)	Hulett (4-5)	None		98	28-9	12-3
Apr. 18	at Louisiana–Monroe	RV	Geo-Surfaces Field at the ULM Softball Complex • Monroe, LA	**W** 5-2	**Baker** (5-3)	Chavarria (1-7)	None		73	29-9	13-3
Apr. 21	Georgia Tech		Troy Softball Complex • Troy, AL	**L** 2-4	Neleman (8-6)	**Johnson** (17-5)	None	ESPN+	113	29-10	
Apr. 21	Georgia Tech		Troy Softball Complex • Troy, AL	**W** 9-5	**Blasingame** (5-0)	Bruce (1-6)	**Baker** (1)	ESPN+	104	30-10	
Apr. 25	at Appalachian State		Sywassink/Lloyd Family Stadium • Boone, NC	**W** 3-2	**Johnson** (18-5)	Longanecker (12-5)	None		50	31-10	14-3
Apr. 25	at Appalachian State		Sywassink/Lloyd Family Stadium • Boone, NC	**W** 8-6	**Baker** (6-3)	Buckner (4-3)	**Johnson** (2)		50	32-10	15-3
Apr. 30	RV Texas State		Troy Softball Complex • Troy, AL	**L** 3-4	Mullins (17-6)	**Johnson** (18-6)	None	ESPN+	134	32-11	15-4

May (2-2)
Date	Opponent	Rank	Site/stadium	Score	Win	Loss	Save	TV	Attendance	Overall record	SBC record
May 1	RV Texas State		Troy Softball Complex • Troy, AL	**L** 0-3	King (9-2)	**Baker** (6-4)	None	ESPN+	132	32-12	15-5
May 2	RV Texas State		Troy Softball Complex • Troy, AL	**W** 6-4	**Baker** (7-4)	King (9-3)	None	ESPN+	121	33-12	16-5
May 7	at South Alabama		Jaguar Field • Mobile, AL	**W** 1-0	**Johnson** (19-6)	Lackie (15-9)	None		200	34-12	17-5
May 8	at South Alabama		Jaguar Field • Mobile, AL	**L** 6-7	Lackie (16-9)	**Johnson** (19-7)	None		200	34-13	17-6

Postseason (3-4)

SBC Tournament (2-2)
Date	Opponent	(Seed)/Rank	Site/stadium	Score	Win	Loss	Save	TV	Attendance	Overall record	SBC record
May 12	vs. (6) UT Arlington	(3)	Troy Softball Complex • Troy, AL	**L** 1-2	Hines (6-11)	**Baker** (7-5)	Gardiner (5)	ESPN+	516	34-14	
May 13	vs. (9) Louisiana–Monroe	(3)	Troy Softball Complex • Troy, AL	**W** 5-1	**Johnson** (20-7)	Hulett (6-11)	None	ESPN+	603	35-14	
May 14	vs. (6) UT Arlington	(3)	Troy Softball Complex • Troy, AL	**W** 3-1	**Blasingame** (6-0)	Valencia (4-8)	None	ESPN+	621	36-14	
May 14	vs. (4) South Alabama	(3)	Troy Softball Complex • Troy, AL	**L** 6-10	Hardy (4-2)	**Blasingame** (6-1)	None	ESPN+	432	36-15	

NCAA Division I softball tournament (1-2)
Date	Opponent	(Seed)/Rank	Site/stadium	Score	Win	Loss	Save	TV	Attendance	Overall record	Tournament record
Tuscaloosa Regionals
May 21	vs. (2)/No. 13 Clemson	(3)	Rhoads Stadium • Tuscaloosa, AL	**L** 0-8 (5 inns)	Cagle (27-5)	**Johnson** (20-8)	None	ESPN3		36-16	0-1
May 22	vs. (4) Alabama State	(3)	Rhoads Stadium • Tuscaloosa, AL	**W** 8-0	**Johnson** (21-8)	Sullivan (18-11)	None	ESPN3		37-16	1-1
May 22	vs. (2)/No. 13 Clemson	(3)	Rhoads Stadium • Tuscaloosa, AL	**L** 2-4	Cagle (28-6)	**Baker** (7-6)	None	ESPN3	2,987	37-17	1-2

Schedule source:

*Rankings are based on the team's current ranking in the NFCA/USA Softball poll.

== Tuscaloosa Regional ==
Tuscaloosa Regional Teams
(1) Alabama Crimson Tide	(2) Clemson Tigers	(3) Troy Trojans	(4) Alabama State Lady Hornets

First Round
3	Alabama	9
Alabama State	0
Troy	0
Clemson	8
Lower round 1
Alabama State	0
Troy	8

Semi-Finals
3	Alabama	6
Clemson	0
Lower final
Troy	2
Clemson	4

Finals
3	Alabama
Clemson

== Postseason ==
=== Conference accolades ===
- Player of the Year: Ciara Bryan – LA
- Pitcher of the Year: Summer Ellyson – LA
- Freshman of the Year: Sara Vanderford – TXST
- Newcomer of the Year: Ciara Bryan – LA
- Coach of the Year: Gerry Glasco – LA

All Conference First Team

- Ciara Bryan (LA)
- Summer Ellyson (LA)
- Sara Vanderford (TXST)
- Leanna Johnson (TROY)
- Jessica Mullins (TXST)
- Olivia Lackie (USA)
- Kj Murphy (UTA)
- Katie Webb (TROY)
- Jayden Mount (ULM)
- Kandra Lamb (LA)
- Kendall Talley (LA)
- Meredith Keel (USA)
- Tara Oltmann (TXST)
- Jade Sinness (TROY)
- Katie Lively (TROY)

All Conference Second Team

- Kelly Horne (TROY)
- Meagan King (TXST)
- Mackenzie Brasher (USA)
- Bailee Wilson (GASO)
- Makiya Thomas (CCU)
- Kaitlyn Alderink (LA)
- Abby Krzywiecki (USA)
- Kenzie Longanecker (APP)
- Alissa Dalton (LA)
- Julie Rawls (LA)
- Korie Kreps (ULM)
- Kayla Rosado (CCU)
- Justice Milz (LA)
- Gabby Buruato (APP)
- Arieann Bell (TXST)

== Rankings ==
Ranking movements Legend: ██ Increase in ranking ██ Decrease in ranking — = Not ranked RV = Received votes
	Week																
Poll	Pre	1	2	3	4	5	6	7	8	9	10	11	12	13	14	15	Final
NFCA / USA Today	—	—	—	RV	—	—	—	—	RV	RV	—	—	—	—			
Softball America		—	—	—	—	—	—	—	—	—	—	—	—	—			
ESPN.com/USA Softball	—	—	—	RV	—	—	—	—	—	—	—	—	—	—			
D1Softball	—	—	—	—	—	—	—	—	—	—	—	—	—	—			
