= 2021 UT Arlington Mavericks softball team =

American college softball season

2021 UT Arlington Mavericks softball
- Conference: Sun Belt Conference
- Record: 17–34 (9–14 SBC)
- Head coach: Peejay Brun (4th season)
- Assistant coaches: Miranda Kramer; Matthew Alberghini
- Home stadium: Allan Saxe Field

2021 Sun Belt Conference softball standings
	Conf.				Overall
Team	W		L	PCT	W		L	PCT
No. 15 Louisiana ‍†‍‡‍^{y}	21	–	3	.875	47	–	12	.797
Texas State ‍‍‍^{y}	17	–	6	.739	39	–	14	.736
Troy ‍‍‍^{y}	17	–	6	.739	37	–	17	.685
South Alabama ‍‍‍^{y}	13	–	9	.591	31	–	21	.596
Appalachian State ‍‍‍	8	–	12	.400	27	–	19	.587
Georgia Southern ‍‍‍	9	–	14	.391	17	–	26	.395
UT Arlington ‍‍‍	9	–	14	.391	17	–	34	.333
Coastal Carolina ‍‍‍	9	–	15	.375	21	–	24	.467
Louisiana–Monroe ‍‍‍	6	–	15	.286	17	–	32	.347
Georgia State ‍‍‍	3	–	18	.143	16	–	30	.348
† – Conference champion ‡ – Tournament champion y – Invited to the NCAA tournament As of May 23, 2021; Rankings from NFCA

The 2021 UT Arlington Mavericks softball team represented the University of Texas at Arlington during the 2020 NCAA Division I softball season. The Mavericks played their home games at Allan Saxe Field. The Mavericks were led by fourth-year head coach Peejay Brun and were members of the Sun Belt Conference.

== Preseason ==
=== Sun Belt Conference Coaches Poll ===
The Sun Belt Conference Coaches Poll was released on February 8, 2021. UT Arlington was picked to finish fourth in the Sun Belt Conference with 68 votes.

Coaches poll
Predicted finish	Team	Votes (1st place)
1	Louisiana	100 (10)
2	Troy	87
3	Texas State	72
4	Coastal Carolina	68
4	UT Arlington	68
6	Appalachian State	43
7	Georgia Southern	38
8	South Alabama	36
9	Louisiana-Monroe	22
10	Georgia State	16

=== National Softball Signing Day ===
Player	Position	Hometown	Previous Team
Kaylee Cavazos	Infielder	San Marcos, Texas	San Marcos HS
Aaliyah White	Outfielder	Angleton, Texas	Angleton HS
Morgan Max	Pitcher	Moore, Oklahoma	Moore HS
Haley Mountain	Outfielder/Infielder	The Woodlands, Texas	The Woodlands HS
Jaycie Hall	Pitcher	Paris, Indiana	North Lamar HS

== Roster ==
2021 UT Arlington Mavericks roster
Pitchers: 00 Allie Gardiner - Junior; 3 JoJo Valencia - Senior; 15 RC Phillips - Senior; 19 Kenedy Hines - Sophomore; 21 Laura Henriksen - Junior; 22 Gracie Bumpurs - Freshman; Outfielders: 4 Reagan Hukill - Sophomore; 5 Dariane Cram - Freshman; 13 Reese Scott - Freshman; Catchers: 6 Sophie Wideman - Junior; 10 Courtney Ogle - Senior; 20 Cielo Morin - Sophomore; 23 Jaden Hoelker - Junior	Infielders: 1 Jessica Carreon - Freshman; 7 Madison Miller - Senior; 8 Jadyn Erickson - Sophomore; 9 KJ Murphy - Senior; 11 Anjelica Gonzalez - Sophomore; 16 Aileen Garcia - Senior; 17 Amber Langston - Senior; 18 Kimber Cortemelia - Junior; 24 Morgan Westbrook - Freshman; 26 Emily Evans - Redshirt Junior; 27 Lindsey Franklin - Sophomore; 33 Raegan Edwards - Freshman

=== Coaching staff ===
2021 UT Arlington Mavericks coaching staff
- Peejay Brun – Head Coach – 4th year
- Miranda Kramer – Assistant Head Coach – 2nd year
- Matthew Alberghini – Assistant Head Coach – 1st year
- Christiana Sides – Graduate Assistant – 1st year

== Schedule and results ==
Legend
	UT Arlington win
	UT Arlington loss
	Postponement/Cancellation
**Bold**	UT Arlington team member

2021 UT Arlington softball game log
Regular season (16-32)

February (1-7)
Date	Opponent	Rank	Site/stadium	Score	Win	Loss	Save	TV	Attendance	Overall record	SBC record
Maverick Classic
Feb. 19	Abilene Christian		Allan Saxe Field • Arlington, TX	Game cancelled due to threat of freezing rain/sleet/snow in Arlington							
Feb. 19	No. 20 Arkansas		Allan Saxe Field • Arlington, TX	Game cancelled due to threat of freezing rain/sleet/snow in Arlington							
Feb. 20	No. 20 Arkansas		Allan Saxe Field • Arlington, TX	Game cancelled due to threat of freezing rain/sleet/snow in Arlington							
Feb. 20	Wichita State		Allan Saxe Field • Arlington, TX	Game cancelled due to threat of freezing rain/sleet/snow in Arlington							
Feb. 21	Abilene Christian		Allan Saxe Field • Arlington, TX	Game cancelled due to threat of freezing rain/sleet/snow in Arlington							
Feb. 22	No. 20 Arkansas		Allan Saxe Field • Arlington, TX	**L** 6-10	Howell (1-0)	**Hines** (0-1)	None			0-1	
Feb. 22	No. 20 Arkansas		Allan Saxe Field • Arlington, TX	**L** 3-4	Bloom (1-1)	**Bumpurs** (0-1)	Haff (1)			0-2	
Feb. 24	at No. 23 Baylor		Getterman Field • Waco, TX	**L** 1-6	Rodoni (1-1)	**Bumpurs** (0-2)	None		263	0-3	
UTSA Classic
Feb. 26	vs. Texas A&M–Corpus Christi		Roadrunner Field • San Antonio, TX	**W** 9-7	**Bumpurs** (1-2)	Lombrana (2-2)	**Hines** (1)		50	1-3	
Feb. 26	vs. Kansas		Roadrunner Field • San Antonio, TX	**L** 4-11	Reed (1-2)	**Hines** (0-2)	None		50	1-4	
Feb. 27	vs. Texas A&M–Corpus Christi		Roadrunner Field • San Antonio, TX	**L** 8-12	McNeill (1-0)	**Hines** (0-3)	None		50	1-5	
Feb. 27	at UTSA		Roadrunner Field • San Antonio, TX	**L** 1-9 (5 inns)	Gilbert (1-0)	**Bumpurs** (1-3)	None		50	1-6	
Feb. 28	vs. Kansas		Roadrunner Field • San Antonio, TX	**L** 8-10	Reed (1-2)	**Henriksen** (0-1)	None			1-7	

March (7-13)
Date	Opponent	Rank	Site/stadium	Score	Win	Loss	Save	TV	Attendance	Overall record	SBC record
Boerner Invitational
Mar. 4	Texas A&M–Corpus Christi		Allan Saxe Field • Arlington, TX	**L** 4-5	Lara (4-1)	**Bumpurs** (1-4)	Lombrana (1)		156	1-8	
Mar. 5	No. 23 Iowa State		Allan Saxe Field • Arlington, TX	**L** 2-8	Spelhaug (5-0)	**Hines** (0-4)	None		156	1-9	
Mar. 6	Missouri State		Allan Saxe Field • Arlington, TX	**W** 3-2	**Gardiner** (1-0)	Johnston (2-1)	None		156	2-9	
Mar. 6	Wichita State		Allan Saxe Field • Arlington, TX	**L** 3-6	McDonald (4-1)	**Hines** (0-5)	Bingham (1)		156	2-10	
Mar. 7	North Texas		Allan Saxe Field • Arlington, TX	**W** 2-0	**Hines** (1-5)	Trautwein (3-3)	**Gardiner** (1)		156	3-10	
Mar. 10	at No. 1 Oklahoma		OU Softball Complex • Norman, OK	**L** 0-14	May (6-0)	**Gardiner** (1-1)	None		405	3-11	
Mar. 13	Troy		Allan Saxe Field • Arlington, TX	**L** 0-5	Johnson (9-3)	**Bumpurs** (1-5)	None		156	3-12	0-1
Mar. 13	Troy		Allan Saxe Field • Arlington, TX	**L** 1-4	Baker (4-1)	**Hines** (1-6)	None		156	3-13	0-2
Mar. 14	Troy		Allan Saxe Field • Arlington, TX	**L** 2-10	Johnson (10-3)	**Valencia** (0-1)	None		156	3-14	0-3
Mar. 17	at North Texas		Lovelace Stadium • Denton, TX	**L** 4-5	Worthington (3-0)	**Hines** (1-7)	Trautwein (3)		104	3-15	
Mar. 19	No. 15 Louisiana		Allan Saxe Field • Arlington, TX	**L** 6-9	Lamb (6-2)	**Henriksen** (0-2)	None		156	3-16	0-4
Mar. 20	No. 15 Louisiana		Allan Saxe Field • Arlington, TX	**W** 8-3	**Gardiner** (2-1)	Ellyson (5-4)	None		156	4-16	1-4
Mar. 21	No. 15 Louisiana		Allan Saxe Field • Arlington, TX	**L** 2-4	Lamb (7-2)	**Gardiner** (2-2)	None		156	4-17	1-5
Mar. 24	at Stephan F. Austin		SFA Softball Field • Nacogdoches, TX	**L** 0-2	Chism (2-0)	**Hines** (1-8)	Wilbur (2)		132	4-18	
Bevo Classic
Mar. 26	vs. UTSA		Red and Charline McCombs Field • Austin, TX	**W** 12-1 (5 inns)	**Hines** (2-8)	Estell (1-2)	None	LHN	335	5-18	
Mar. 27	at No. 8 Texas		Red and Charline McCombs Field • Austin, TX	**L** 1-2	O'Leary (5-0)	**Valencia** (0-2)	None	LHN	413	5-19	
Mar. 27	vs. South Dakota		Red and Charline McCombs Field • Austin, TX	**W** 5-0	**Bumpurs** (2-5)	Lisko (2-9)	**Gardiner** (2)	LHN	413	6-19	
Mar. 28	vs. South Dakota		Red and Charline McCombs Field • Austin, TX	**W** 6-1	**Valencia** (1-2)	Lisko (3-10)	None	LHN	321	7-19	
Mar. 28	at No. 8 Texas		Red and Charline McCombs Field • Austin, TX	**L** 1-9	Jacobsen (9-2)	**Hines** (2-9)	None	LHN	434	7-20	
Mar. 31	at Sam Houston State		Bearkat Softball Complex • Huntsville, TX	**W** 8-1	**Henriksen** (1-2)	Billmeier (1-3)	None		109	8-20	

April (6–8)
Date	Opponent	Rank	Site/stadium	Score	Win	Loss	Save	TV	Attendance	Overall record	SBC record
Apr. 2	at Louisiana–Monroe		Geo-Surfaces Field at the ULM Softball Complex • Monroe, LA	**W** 7-0	**Valencia** (2-2)	Chavarria (1-5)	None		263	9-20	2-5
Apr. 3	at Louisiana–Monroe		Geo-Surfaces Field at the ULM Softball Complex • Monroe, LA	**W** 11-1 (5 inns)	**Hines** (3-9)	Coons (1-3)	None		261	10-20	3-5
Apr. 3	at Louisiana–Monroe		Geo-Surfaces Field at the ULM Softball Complex • Monroe, LA	**W** 10-6	**Gardiner** (3-2)	Chavarria (1-6)	None		209	11-20	4-5
Apr. 7	No. 7 Texas		Allan Saxe Field • Arlington, TX	**L** 0-12 (5 inns)	Jacobsen (11-2)	**Henriksen** (1-3)	None		156	11-21	
Apr. 10	Georgia State		Allan Saxe Field • Arlington, TX	**L** 0-2	Mooney (5-7)	**Valencia** (2-3)	None		156	11-22	4-6
Apr. 10	Georgia State		Allan Saxe Field • Arlington, TX	**W** 7-2	**Henriksen** (2-3)	Doolittle (0-3)	None		156	12-22	5-6
Apr. 11	Georgia State		Allan Saxe Field • Arlington, TX	**W** 3-1	**Valencia** (3-3)	Buck (3-4)	**Gardiner** (3)		156	13-22	6-6
Apr. 14	North Texas		Allan Saxe Field • Arlington, TX	**L** 0-1	Wall (9-6)	**Henriksen** (2-4)	Trautwein (5)		156	13-23	
Apr. 18	at South Alabama		Jaguar Field • Mobile, AL	**L** 1-3	Lackie (13-6)	**Valencia** (3-4)	None		200	13-24	6-7
Apr. 18	at South Alabama		Jaguar Field • Mobile, AL	**W** 7-4	**Hines** (4-9)	Hughes (2-2)	**Valencia** (1)		200	14-24	7-7
Apr. 21	at No. 11 Oklahoma State		Cowgirl Stadium • Stillwater, OK	**L** 3-9	Simunek (4-3)	**Hines** (4-10)	None		325	14-25	
Apr. 24	at Coastal Carolina		St. Johns Stadium – Charles Webb-John Lott Field • Conway, SC	**L** 5-8	Beasley-Polko (9-8)	**Valencia** (3-5)	Brabham (1)		125	14-26	7-8
Apr. 24	at Coastal Carolina		St. Johns Stadium – Charles Webb-John Lott Field • Conway, SC	**L** 1-6	De Jesus (4-6)	**Hines** (4-11)	None		125	14-27	7-9
Apr. 25	at Coastal Carolina		St. Johns Stadium – Charles Webb-John Lott Field • Conway, SC	**L** 2-5	Brabham (5-6)	**Valencia** (3-6)	None		125	14-28	7-10
Apr. 28	Baylor		Allan Saxe Field • Arlington, TX	Game cancelled							

May (2-4)
Date	Opponent	Rank	Site/stadium	Score	Win	Loss	Save	TV	Attendance	Overall record	SBC record
May 1	Appalachian State		Allan Saxe Field • Arlington, TX	**W** 2-0	**Valencia** (4-6)	Longanecker (12-6)	**Gardiner** (4)		156	15-28	8-10
May 1	Appalachian State		Allan Saxe Field • Arlington, TX	**W** 6-0	**Hines** (5-11)	Holland (7-5)	None		156	16-28	9-10
May 2	Appalachian State		Allan Saxe Field • Arlington, TX	**L** 0-2	Longnecker (13-6)	**Henriksen** (2-5)	None		156	16-29	9-11
May 6	at Texas State		Bobcat Softball Stadium • San Marcos, TX	**L** 0-8	Mullins (18-6)	**Valencia** (5-6)	None		265	16-30	9-12
May 7	at Texas State		Bobcat Softball Stadium • San Marcos, TX	**L** 1-2	King (10-3)	**Bumpurs** (2-6)	Mullins (3)		271	16-31	9-13
May 8	at Texas State		Bobcat Softball Stadium • San Marcos, TX	**L** 2-4	Mullins (19-6)	**Gardiner** (3-3)	None		306	16-32	9-14

Post-Season (1-2)

SBC tournament (1-2)
Date	Opponent	(Seed)/Rank	Site/stadium	Score	Win	Loss	Save	TV	Attendance	Overall record	SBC record
May 12	vs. (3) Troy	(6)	Troy Softball Complex • Troy, AL	**W** 2-1 (8 inns)	**Hines** (6-11)	Baker (7-5)	**Gardiner** (5)	ESPN+	516	17-32	
May 13	vs. (2) Texas State	(6)	Troy Softball Complex • Troy, AL	**L** 0-4	King (11-3)	**Bumpurs** (2-7)	None	ESPN+	138	17-33	
May 14	vs. (3) Troy	(6)	Troy Softball Complex • Troy, AL	**L** 1-3	Blasingame (6-0)	**Valencia** (4-8)	None	ESPN+	621	17-34	

Schedule source:

*Rankings are based on the team's current ranking in the NFCA/USA Softball poll.

== Postseason ==
=== Conference accolades ===
- Player of the Year: Ciara Bryan – LA
- Pitcher of the Year: Summer Ellyson – LA
- Freshman of the Year: Sara Vanderford – TXST
- Newcomer of the Year: Ciara Bryan – LA
- Coach of the Year: Gerry Glasco – LA

All Conference First Team

- Ciara Bryan (LA)
- Summer Ellyson (LA)
- Sara Vanderford (TXST)
- Leanna Johnson (TROY)
- Jessica Mullins (TXST)
- Olivia Lackie (USA)
- Kj Murphy (UTA)
- Katie Webb (TROY)
- Jayden Mount (ULM)
- Kandra Lamb (LA)
- Kendall Talley (LA)
- Meredith Keel (USA)
- Tara Oltmann (TXST)
- Jade Sinness (TROY)
- Katie Lively (TROY)

All Conference Second Team

- Kelly Horne (TROY)
- Meagan King (TXST)
- Mackenzie Brasher (USA)
- Bailee Wilson (GASO)
- Makiya Thomas (CCU)
- Kaitlyn Alderink (LA)
- Abby Krzywiecki (USA)
- Kenzie Longanecker (APP)
- Alissa Dalton (LA)
- Julie Rawls (LA)
- Korie Kreps (ULM)
- Kayla Rosado (CCU)
- Justice Milz (LA)
- Gabby Buruato (APP)
- Arieann Bell (TXST)
