= 2021 Louisiana–Monroe Warhawks softball team =

American college softball season

2021 Louisiana–Monroe Warhawks softball
- Conference: Sun Belt Conference
- Record: 17–32 (6–15 SBC)
- Head coach: Molly Fichtner (3rd season)
- Assistant coaches: Jessica Thornton; Lea Wodach
- Home stadium: Geo-Surfaces Field at the ULM Softball Complex

2021 Sun Belt Conference softball standings
	Conf.				Overall
Team	W		L	PCT	W		L	PCT
No. 15 Louisiana ‍†‍‡‍^{y}	21	–	3	.875	47	–	12	.797
Texas State ‍‍‍^{y}	17	–	6	.739	39	–	14	.736
Troy ‍‍‍^{y}	17	–	6	.739	37	–	17	.685
South Alabama ‍‍‍^{y}	13	–	9	.591	31	–	21	.596
Appalachian State ‍‍‍	8	–	12	.400	27	–	19	.587
Georgia Southern ‍‍‍	9	–	14	.391	17	–	26	.395
UT Arlington ‍‍‍	9	–	14	.391	17	–	34	.333
Coastal Carolina ‍‍‍	9	–	15	.375	21	–	24	.467
Louisiana–Monroe ‍‍‍	6	–	15	.286	17	–	32	.347
Georgia State ‍‍‍	3	–	18	.143	16	–	30	.348
† – Conference champion ‡ – Tournament champion y – Invited to the NCAA tournament As of May 23, 2021; Rankings from NFCA

The 2021 Louisiana–Monroe Warhawks softball team represented the University of Louisiana at Monroe during the 2021 NCAA Division I softball season. The Warhawks played their home games at Geo-Surfaces Field at the ULM Softball Complex. The Warhawks were led by second-year head coach Molly Fichtner and were members of the Sun Belt Conference.

== Preseason ==
=== Sun Belt Conference Coaches Poll ===
The Sun Belt Conference Coaches Poll was released on February 8, 2021. Louisiana–Monroe was picked to finish ninth in the Sun Belt Conference with 22 votes.

Coaches poll
Predicted finish	Team	Votes (1st place)
1	Louisiana	100 (10)
2	Troy	87
3	Texas State	72
4	Coastal Carolina	68
4	UT Arlington	68
6	Appalachian State	43
7	Georgia Southern	38
8	South Alabama	36
9	Louisiana-Monroe	22
10	Georgia State	16

=== Preseason All-Sun Belt team ===
- Summer Ellyson (LA, SR, Pitcher)
- Leanna Johnson (TROY, SO, Pitcher)
- Allisa Dalton *(LA, SR, Shortstop/3rd Base)
- Katie Webb (TROY, SR, Infielder/1st Base)
- Raina O'Neal (LA, JR, Outfielder)
- Julie Raws (LA, SR, Catcher)
- Courney Dean (CCU, SR, Outfielder)
- Mekhia Freeman (GASO, SR, Outfielder)
- Korie Kreps (ULM, JR, Outfielder)
- Kaitlyn Alderink (LA, SR, 2nd Base)
- Jade Gortarez (LA, SR, Shortstop/3rd Base)
- Ciara Bryan (LA, SR, Outfielder)
- Kelly Horne (TROY, SO, Infielder/2nd Base)
- Makiya Thomas (CCU, SR, Outfielder/Infielder)
- Tara Oltmann (TXST, SR, Infielder/Shortstop)
- Jayden Mount (ULM, SR, Infielder)
- Katie Lively (TROY, SO, Outfielder)

=== National Softball Signing Day ===
Player	Position	Hometown	Previous Team
Lex Chavez	Infielder	Riverside, California	Martin Luther King HS
Gabby Davila	Outfielder	Pearland, Texas	Pearland HS
Kiley DeHart	Outfielder	Lake Charles, Louisiana	Barbe HS
Kinsey Kackley	Pitcher	McKinney, Texas	McKinney Boyd HS

== Roster ==
2021 Louisiana–Monroe Warhawks roster
Pitchers: 1 Kassidy Giddens - Sophomore; 3 Gianni Hulett - Freshman; 14 Amber Coons - Senior; 24 Murphy Williams - Junior; 25 Adrianna Chavarria - Junior; Outfielders: 6 Caley McGuff - Freshman; 9 Charlie Names - Senior; 20 Alysia Anderson - Senior; 26 Korie Kreps - Junior	Catchers: 10 Kelsey Giddens - Sophomore; 21 Jessica Williams - Junior; 23 Kendall Morton - Sophomore; 28 Madison Blount - Freshman; Infielders: 5 Jayden Mount - Senior; 7 Andie Edwards - Freshman; 17 Madelyn Fletcher - Freshman; 19 Jacelyn Buck - Sophomore; Utility: 2 Kennedy Page - Junior; 12 Rylee Lara - Senior; 15 Kennedy Johnson - Junior

=== Coaching staff ===
2021 Louisiana–Monroe Warhawks coaching staff
- Molly Fichtner – Head Coach – 3rd year
- Jessica Thornton – Assistant Head Coach – 6th year
- Lea Wodach – Assistant Head Coach – 2nd year
- Rhianna Rich – Graduate Assistant – 1st year

== Schedule and results ==
Legend
	Louisiana–Monroe win
	Louisiana–Monroe loss
	Postponement/Cancellation/Suspensions
**Bold**	Louisiana–Monroe team member

2021 Louisiana–Monroe Warhawks softball game log
Regular season (16-30)

February (3-6)
Date	Opponent	Rank	Site/stadium	Score	Win	Loss	Save	TV	Attendance	Overall record	SBC record
Best on the Bayou Classic
Feb. 11	vs. Louisiana Tech		Ouachita Sportsplex • Monroe, LA	**L** 2-3	Hutchinson (1-0)	**Chavarria** (0-1)	None			0-1	
Feb. 12	vs. Jacksonville State		Ouachita Sportsplex • Monroe, LA	**W** 7-6	**Chavarria** (1-1)	Watkins (0-1)	None			1-1	
Feb. 13	vs. Lipscomb		Ouachita Sportsplex • Monroe, LA	Game cancelled due to threat of freezing rain/sleet/snow in Monroe							
Feb. 13	vs. No. 18 Arkansas		Ouachita Sportsplex • Monroe, LA	Game cancelled due to the threat of freezing rain/snow/sleet in Monroe							
Feb. 17	at McNeese State		Joe Miller Field at Cowgirl Diamond • Lake Charles, LA	Game postponed due to the threat of freezing rain/snow/sleet in Lake Charles							
Bearkat Classic
Feb. 19	vs. UTSA		Bearkat Softball Complex • Huntsville, TX	Game cancelled due to the threat of freezing rain/snow/sleet in Huntsville							
Feb. 19	at Sam Houston State		Bearkat Softball Complex • Huntsville, TX	Game cancelled due to the threat of freezing rain/snow/sleet in Huntsville							
Feb. 20	vs. UTSA		Bearkat Softball Complex • Huntsville, TX	Game cancelled due to the threat of freezing rain/snow/sleet in Huntsville							
Feb. 20	at Sam Houston State		Bearkat Softball Complex • Huntsville, TX	Game cancelled due to the threat of freezing rain/snow/sleet in Huntsville							
Feb. 21	at Sam Houston State		Bearkat Softball Complex • Huntsville, TX	Game cancelled due to the threat of freezing rain/snow/sleet in Huntsville							
Feb. 21	vs. Northwestern State		Ouachita Sportsplex • Monroe, LA	Game cancelled due to the inclement field conditions							
Feb. 21	vs. Northwestern State		Ouachita Sportsplex • Monroe, LA	Game cancelled due to the inclement field conditions							
Feb. 23	Louisiana Tech		Geo-Surfaces Field at the ULM Softball Complex • Monroe, LA	**W** 8-5	**Hulett** (1-0)	Keonig (0-2)	**Chavarria** (1)		185	2-1	
Feb. 24	vs. Eastern Illinois		Lady Jaguar Field • Baton Rouge, LA	**L** 4-5	Montgomery (1-0)	**Coons** (0-1)	None			2-2	
Feb. 24	at Southern		Lady Jaguar Field • Baton Rouge, LA	**W** 3-2	**Giddens** (1-0)	Donaldson (0-1)	**Hulett** (1)			3-2	
Samford Tournament
Feb. 27	vs. Northern Iowa		Bulldog Softball Field • Homewood, AL	**L** 6-9	Packard (2-1)	**Hulett** (1-1)	None	ESPN+	30	3-3	
Feb. 27	at Samford		Bulldog Softball Field • Homewood, AL	**L** 1-2	Swaney (2-1)	**Williams** (0-1)	Barnett (1)	ESPN+	100	3-4	
Feb. 28	vs Northern Iowa		Bulldog Softball Field • Homewood, AL	**L** 3-11	Packard (3-1)	**Williams** (0-2)	None	ESPN+	60	3-5	
Feb. 28	at Samford		Bulldog Softball Field • Homewood, AL	**L** 2-5	Barnett (4-1)	**Giddens** (1-1)	None	ESPN+	125	3-6	

March (7-8)
Date	Opponent	Rank	Site/stadium	Score	Win	Loss	Save	TV	Attendance	Overall record	SBC record
Mar. 5	at Northwestern State		Lady Demon Diamond • Natchitoches, LA	**L** 1-3	Howell (2-1)	**Hulett** (1-2)	None			3-7	
Oklahoma Tournament
Mar. 5	vs. No. 18 Missouri		OU Softball Complex • Norman, OK	**L** 0-6	Weber (5-0)	**Coons** (0-2)	None	SoonerSports.TV	100	3-8	
Mar. 6	vs. Sam Houston State		OU Softball Complex • Norman, OK	**L** 3-5	Vento (2-1)	**Williams** (0-1)	None	SoonerSports.TV	50	3-9	
Mar. 6	at No. 1 Oklahoma		OU Softball Complex • Norman, OK	**L** 0-9 (5 inns)	Saile (4-0)	**Chavarria** (1-2)	None	FSOK	216	3-10	
Mar. 7	vs. No. 18 Missouri		OU Softball Complex • Norman, OK	**L** 0-20 (5 inns)	Schumacher (4-1)	**Williams** (0-4)	None	SoonerSports.TV	100	3-11	
Mar. 7	vs. Sam Houston State		OU Softball Complex • Norman, OK	**W** 8-6	**Hulett** (2-2)	Dunn (1-2)	None	SoonerSports.TV	100	4-11	
Mar. 10	Grambling State		Geo-Surfaces Field at the ULM Softball Complex • Monroe, LA	**W** 4-2	**Giddens** (2-1)	Shells (0-2)	None			5-11	
Mar. 10	Grambling State		Geo-Surfaces Field at the ULM Softball Complex • Monroe, LA	**W** 8-0 (5 inns)	**Coons** (1-2)	Bonner (1-3)	None		287	6-11	
Mar. 13	Coastal Carolina		Geo-Surfaces Field at the ULM Softball Complex • Monroe, LA	**W** 6-3	**Hulett** (3-2)	Beasley-Polko (4-4)	None	ESPN+		7-11	1-0
Mar. 13	Coastal Carolina		Geo-Surfaces Field at the ULM Softball Complex • Monroe, LA	**W** 8-4	**Hulett** (4-2)	De Jesus (1-3)	None	ESPN+	305	8-11	2-0
Mar. 14	Coastal Carolina		Geo-Surfaces Field at the ULM Softball Complex • Monroe, LA	**L** 0-2	Beasley-Polko (5-3)	**Giddens** (1-2)	None		257	8-12	2-1
Mar. 20	at Georgia Southern		Eagle Field at GS Softball Complex • Statesboro, GA	**W** 5-3	**Williams** (1-4)	Garcia (2-3)	**Hulett** (2)	ESPN+	165	9-12	3-1
Mar. 20	at Georgia Southern		Eagle Field at GS Softball Complex • Statesboro, GA	**W** 11-9	**Williams** (2-4)	Feil (0-3)	None	ESPN+		10-12	4-1
Mar. 21	at Georgia Southern		Eagle Field at GS Softball Complex • Statesboro, GA	Game cancelled due to threat of inclement weather and poor field conditions in Statesboro							
Mar. 24	Southeastern Louisiana		Geo-Surfaces Field at the ULM Softball Complex • Monroe, LA	**L** 1-2	Comeaux (6-5)	**Chavarria** (1-3)	DuBois (4)		296	10-13	
Mar. 30	at No. 15 LSU		Tiger Park • Baton Rouge, LA	**L** 5-7	Kilponen (6-4)	**Chavarria** (1-4)	None		585	10-14	

April (4–13)
Date	Opponent	Rank	Site/stadium	Score	Win	Loss	Save	TV	Attendance	Overall record	SBC record
Apr. 2	UT Arlington		Geo-Surfaces Field at the ULM Softball Complex • Monroe, LA	**L** 0-7	Valencia (2-2)	**Chavarria** (1-5)	None		261	10-15	4-2
Apr. 2	UT Arlington		Geo-Surfaces Field at the ULM Softball Complex • Monroe, LA	**L** 1-11	Hines (3-9)	**Coons** (1-3)	None		261	10-16	4-3
Apr. 3	UT Arlington		Geo-Surfaces Field at the ULM Softball Complex • Monroe, LA	**L** 6-10	Gardiner (3-2)	**Chavarria** (1-6)	None		209	10-17	4-4
Apr. 6	at Grambling State		GSU Softball Complex • Grambling, LA	Game Cancelled							
Apr. 6	at Grambling State		GSU Softball Complex • Grambling, LA	Game Cancelled							
Apr. 10	at Appalachian State		Sywassink/Lloyd Family Stadium • Boone, NC	**L** 2-8 (6 inns)	Longanecker (11-3)	**Williams** (2-5)	None	ESPN+	50	10-18	4-5
Apr. 11	at Appalachian State		Sywassink/Lloyd Family Stadium • Boone, NC	**L** 0-1	Holland (5-4)	**Hulett** (4-3)	None	ESPN+	50	10-19	4-6
Apr. 11	at Appalachian State		Sywassink/Lloyd Family Stadium • Boone, NC	**L** 0-1 (8 inns)	Buckner (3-2)	**Hulett** (4-4)	None	ESPN+	10-20	4-7	
Apr. 13	at Louisiana Tech		Lady Techster Softball Complex • Ruston, LA	**W** 5-4	**Coons** (2-3)	Goff (0-1)	None		355	11-20	
Apr. 15	at Jackson State		JSU Softball Field • Jackson, MS	**W** 10-0 (5 inns)	**Giddens** (3-2)	Kippenbender (0-1)	None		55	12-20	
Apr. 15	at Jackson State		JSU Softball Field • Jackson, MS	**W** 10-5 (8 inns)	**Coons** (3-3)	Owens (5-7)	None		75	13-20	
Apr. 17	RV Troy		Geo-Surfaces Field at the ULM Softball Complex • Monroe, LA	**L** 2-13 (5 inns)	Johnson (16-4)	**Coons** (3-4)	None		98	13-21	4-8
Apr. 17	RV Troy		Geo-Surfaces Field at the ULM Softball Complex • Monroe, LA	**L** 6-10	Johnson (16-4)	**Hulett** (4-5)	None		98	13-22	4-9
Apr. 18	RV Troy		Geo-Surfaces Field at the ULM Softball Complex • Monroe, LA	**L** 2-5	Baker (5-3)	**Chavarria** (1-7)	None		73	13-23	4-10
Apr. 21	at Southeastern Louisiana		North Oak Park • Hammond, LA	**L** 1-7	Zumo (15-3)	**Chavarria** (1-8)	None	ESPN+	245	13-24	
Apr. 24	at South Alabama		Jaguar Field • Mobile, AL	Game cancelled							
Apr. 24	at South Alabama		Jaguar Field • Mobile, AL	**L** 2-4	Lackie (15-6)	**Hulett** (4-6)	None	ESPN+	200	13-25	4-11
Apr. 25	at South Alabama		Jaguar Field • Mobile, AL	**L** 2-5	Hardy (2-1)	**Chavarria** (1-9)	None	ESPN+	200	13-26	4-12
Apr. 27	at Grambling State		GSU Softball Complex • Grambling, LA	**W** 5-2	**Coons** (2-2)	Polk (0-1)	None		75	14-26	
Apr. 28	at McNeese State		Joe Miller Field at Cowgirl Diamond • Lake Charles, LA	**L** 1-6	Edwards (7-1)	**Hulett** (4-7)	None		249	14-27	

May (2-3)
Date	Opponent	Rank	Site/stadium	Score	Win	Loss	Save	TV	Attendance	Overall record	SBC record
May 1	Georgia State		Geo-Surfaces Field at the ULM Softball Complex • Monroe, LA	**W** 2-1	**Hulett** (5-7)	Mooney (2-4)	None	ESPN+	271	15-27	5-12
May 1	Georgia State		Geo-Surfaces Field at the ULM Softball Complex • Monroe, LA	**L** 1-2	Freeman (3-3)	**Hulett** (5-7)	Buck (2)	ESPN+	271	15-28	5-13
May 2	Georgia State		Geo-Surfaces Field at the ULM Softball Complex • Monroe, LA	Game cancelled due to threat of inclement weather							
May 6	at No. 14 Louisiana		Yvette Girouard Field at Lamson Park • Lafayette, LA	**L** 1-10	Ellyson (19-5)	**Chavarria** (1-10)	None		543	15-29	5-14
May 7	at No. 14 Louisiana		Yvette Girouard Field at Lamson Park • Lafayette, LA	**L** 6-8	Ellyson (20-5)	**Hulett** (5-8)	None	ESPN+	894	15-30	5-15
May 8	at No. 14 Louisiana		Yvette Girouard Field at Lamson Park • Lafayette, LA	**W** 2-1	**Coons** (5-4)	Ellyson (20-6)	None	ESPN+	961	16-30	6-15

Post-Season (1-2)

SBC tournament (1-2)
Date	Opponent	(Seed)/Rank	Site/stadium	Score	Win	Loss	Save	TV	Attendance	Overall record	SBC record
May 11	vs. (8) Coastal Carolina	(9)	Troy Softball Complex • Troy, AL	**W** 8-6	**Coons** (6-4)	Brabham (5-9)	**Hulett** (3)	ESPN+	169	17-30	
May 12	vs. (1)/No. 14 Louisiana	(9)	Troy Softball Complex • Troy, AL	**L** 0-7	Lamb (16-4)	**Hulett** (6-10)	None	ESPN+	173	17-31	
May 13	vs. (3) Troy	(9)	Troy Softball Complex • Troy, AL	**L** 1-5	Johnson (20-7)	**Hulett** (6-11)	None	ESPN+	603	17-32	

Schedule source:

*Rankings are based on the team's current ranking in the NFCA/USA Softball poll.

== Postseason ==
=== Conference accolades ===
- Player of the Year: Ciara Bryan – LA
- Pitcher of the Year: Summer Ellyson – LA
- Freshman of the Year: Sara Vanderford – TXST
- Newcomer of the Year: Ciara Bryan – LA
- Coach of the Year: Gerry Glasco – LA

All Conference First Team

- Ciara Bryan (LA)
- Summer Ellyson (LA)
- Sara Vanderford (TXST)
- Leanna Johnson (TROY)
- Jessica Mullins (TXST)
- Olivia Lackie (USA)
- Kj Murphy (UTA)
- Katie Webb (TROY)
- Jayden Mount (ULM)
- Kandra Lamb (LA)
- Kendall Talley (LA)
- Meredith Keel (USA)
- Tara Oltmann (TXST)
- Jade Sinness (TROY)
- Katie Lively (TROY)

All Conference Second Team

- Kelly Horne (TROY)
- Meagan King (TXST)
- Mackenzie Brasher (USA)
- Bailee Wilson (GASO)
- Makiya Thomas (CCU)
- Kaitlyn Alderink (LA)
- Abby Krzywiecki (USA)
- Kenzie Longanecker (APP)
- Alissa Dalton (LA)
- Julie Rawls (LA)
- Korie Kreps (ULM)
- Kayla Rosado (CCU)
- Justice Milz (LA)
- Gabby Buruato (APP)
- Arieann Bell (TXST)
