= 2021 Georgia State Panthers softball team =

American college softball season

2021 Georgia State Panthers softball
- Conference: Sun Belt Conference
- Record: 16–30 (3–18 SBC)
- Head coach: Roger Kincaid (11th season)
- Assistant coaches: Todd Downes; Erin Dixson
- Home stadium: Robert E. Heck Softball Complex

2021 Sun Belt Conference softball standings
	Conf.				Overall
Team	W		L	PCT	W		L	PCT
No. 15 Louisiana ‍†‍‡‍^{y}	21	–	3	.875	47	–	12	.797
Texas State ‍‍‍^{y}	17	–	6	.739	39	–	14	.736
Troy ‍‍‍^{y}	17	–	6	.739	37	–	17	.685
South Alabama ‍‍‍^{y}	13	–	9	.591	31	–	21	.596
Appalachian State ‍‍‍	8	–	12	.400	27	–	19	.587
Georgia Southern ‍‍‍	9	–	14	.391	17	–	26	.395
UT Arlington ‍‍‍	9	–	14	.391	17	–	34	.333
Coastal Carolina ‍‍‍	9	–	15	.375	21	–	24	.467
Louisiana–Monroe ‍‍‍	6	–	15	.286	17	–	32	.347
Georgia State ‍‍‍	3	–	18	.143	16	–	30	.348
† – Conference champion ‡ – Tournament champion y – Invited to the NCAA tournament As of May 23, 2021; Rankings from NFCA

The 2021 Georgia State Panthers softball team represented Georgia State Panthers during the 2021 NCAA Division I softball season. The Panthers played their home games at Robert E. Heck Softball Complex. The Panthers were led by eleventh-year head coach Roger Kincaid and were members of the Sun Belt Conference.

== Preseason ==
=== Sun Belt Conference Coaches Poll ===
The Sun Belt Conference Coaches Poll was released on February 8, 2021. Georgia State was picked to finish last in the Sun Belt Conference with 16 votes.

Coaches poll
Predicted finish	Team	Votes (1st place)
1	Louisiana	100 (10)
2	Troy	87
3	Texas State	72
4	Coastal Carolina	68
4	UT Arlington	68
6	Appalachian State	43
7	Georgia Southern	38
8	South Alabama	36
9	Louisiana-Monroe	22
10	Georgia State	16

=== National Softball Signing Day ===
Player	Position	Hometown	Previous Team
Hallie Adams	Pitcher	Marietta, Georgia	Pope HS
Abby Brown	Infielder	Tallapoosa, Georgia	Haralson County HS
Mallory Fletcher	Outfielder/Infielder	Coolidge, Georgia	Thomasville HS
Jaycee Goodwin	Catcher	Paris, Kentucky	Bourbon County HS
Emily Hodnett	Pitcher	Auburn, Georgia	Apalachee HS
Chloe Middlebrooks	Outfielder	Bishop, Georgia	Oconee County HS
Alice Thomas	Outfielder	Warner Robins, Georgia	Houston County HS
Emma Yanes	Infielder	Woodstock, Georgia	Etowah HS

== Roster ==
2021 Georgia State Panthers roster
Pitchers: 10 Sophie Mooney - Sophomore; 11 Elle Doolittle - Freshman; 13 Emily Buck - Redshirt Sophomore; 26 Macy Banks - Freshman; 32 Aniston Wright - Freshman; 33 Julia Allen - Sophomore; 55 Savannah Freeman - Redshirt Junior; Outfielders: 1 Sydney Stavro - Senior; 4 Gabby Benson - Junior; 18 Caroline Brownlee - Freshman; 19 Emily Brown - Sophomore; 23 Alyssa Giles - Freshman	Catchers: 7 Sofia Tunon - Sophomore; 8 Alyssa Brumelow - Senior; 14 Carolyn Deady - Freshman; 21 Kalynn Hicks - Junior; Infielders: 2 Baylee Sexton - Senior; 6 Bailee Richardson - Sophomore; 9 Olivia Davis - Junior; 17 Paige Taylor - Junior; 22 Daisy Hess - Sophomore; 24 Aslinn Spradlin - Freshman; 25 Skylar Mosel - Senior; 44 Gracie Kittrell - Sophomore

=== Coaching staff ===
2021 Georgia State Panthers coaching staff
- Roger Kincaid – Head Coach – 11th year
- Todd Downes – Assistant Head Coach – 10th year
- Erin Dixson – Pitching Coach – 2nd year

== Schedule and results ==
Legend
	Georgia State win
	Georgia State loss
	Postponement/Cancellation/Suspensions
**Bold**	Georgia State team member

2021 Georgia State Panthers softball game log
Regular season (15-28)

February (6-5)
Date	Opponent	Rank	Site/stadium	Score	Win	Loss	Save	TV	Attendance	Overall record	SBC record
Feb. 12	Radford		Robert E. Heck Softball Complex • Decatur, GA	**W** 3-1	**Mooney** (1-0)	Marvin (0-1)	None		113	1-0	
Feb. 12	Radford		Robert E. Heck Softball Complex • Decatur, GA	**W** 6-0	**Buck** (1-0)	Dehart (0-1)	None		197	2-0	
Feb. 13	Boise State		Robert E. Heck Softball Complex • Decatur, GA	**W** 4-3	**Freeman** (1-0)	Johnson (0-2)	None		197	3-0	
Feb. 13	Boise State		Robert E. Heck Softball Complex • Decatur, GA	**L** 0-7	Miller (0-1)	**Allen** (0-1)	None		197	3-1	
Feb. 14	at Georgia Tech		Shirley Clements Mewborn Field • Atlanta, GA	**L** 0-8 (5 inn)	Neleman (3-0)	**Mooney** (1-1)	None	ACCN+	88	3-2	
Feb. 20	at North Carolina A&T		Aggie Softball Complex • Greensboro, GA	**W** 11-2 (5 inn)	**Mooney** (2-1)	Kirby (0-1)	None			4-2	
Feb. 20	at North Carolina A&T		Aggie Softball Complex • Greensboro, NC	**W** 12-4 (6 inn)	**Banks** (1-0)	Stinson (0-1)	None			5-2	
Feb. 21	at UNC Wilmington		Boseman Field • Wilmington, NC	**W** 8-2	**Buck** (2-0)	Pate (0-1)	None		25	6-2	
Feb. 21	at UNC Wilmington		Boseman Field • Wilmington, NC	**L** 4-5	Pearce (1-0)	**Freeman** (1-1)	Gamache (1)		27	6-3	
Feb. 27	No. 19 Georgia		Robert E. Heck Softball Complex • Decatur, GA	**L** 0-7	Mathis (1-1)	**Mooney** (2-2)	Cutting (1)		397	6-4	
Feb. 27	Miami (OH)		Robert E. Heck Softball Complex • Decatur, GA	**L** 4-6	Pratt (1-3)	**Freeman** (1-2)	None		343	6-5	

March (6-10)
Date	Opponent	Rank	Site/stadium	Score	Win	Loss	Save	TV	Attendance	Overall record	SBC record
Mar. 3	Kennesaw State		Robert E. Heck Softball Complex • Decatur, GA	**W** 7-3	**Allen** (1-1)	Kyte (1-2)	**Doolittle** (1)		265	7-5	
JU/UNF Spring Break Challenge
Mar. 5	vs. Buffalo		Debbie & Fred Pruitt Softball Complex • Jacksonville, FL	**W** 10-2	**Banks** (2-0)	Lucyshyn (0-1)	None		27	8-5	
Mar. 5	at Jacksonville		Debbie & Fred Pruitt Softball Complex • Jacksonville, FL	**L** 0-5	Bilodeau (4-4)	**Mooney** (2-3)	None		43	8-6	
Mar. 6	vs. USC Upstate		Debbie & Fred Pruitt Softball Complex • Jacksonville, FL	**L** 4-10	Yoder (2-0)	**Banks** (1-1)	Brown (1)		34	8-7	
Mar. 6	vs. Florida A&M		Debbie & Fred Pruitt Softball Complex • Jacksonville, FL	**W** 13-0 (5 inns)	**Buck** (3-0)	Boatwright (0-3)	None		49	9-7	
Mar. 7	at North Florida		UNF Softball Complex • Jacksonville, FL	**W** 13-7	**Mooney** (3-3)	Clausen (2-3)	**Doolittle** (2)		87	10-7	
Mar. 10	at No. 18 Georgia		Jack Turner Stadium • Athens, GA	**L** 0-1	Mathis (3-1)	**Buck** (3-1)	None	SECN+	87	10-8	
Mar. 13	Chattanooga		Robert E. Heck Softball Complex • Decatur, GA	**W** 6-2	**Mooney** (4-3)	Thompson (1-3)	**Buck** (1)		237	11-8	
Mar. 13	Chattanooga		Robert E. Heck Softball Complex • Decatur, GA	**W** 8-2	**Freeman** (2-2)	Wood (2-4)	None		237	12-8	
Mar. 19	Troy		Robert E. Heck Softball Complex • Decatur, GA	**L** 0-12 (5 inns)	Johnson (11-3)	**Mooney** (4-4)	None		253	12-9	0-1
Mar. 20	Troy		Robert E. Heck Softball Complex • Decatur, GA	**L** 6-11	Blasingame (4-0)	**Banks** (2-2)	None		255	12-10	0-2
Mar. 21	Troy		Robert E. Heck Softball Complex • Decatur, GA	**L** 1-7	Johnson (12-3)	**Buck** (3-2)	None		243	12-11	0-3
Mar. 23	Texas State		Robert E. Heck Softball Complex • Decatur, GA	**L** 2-6	King (5-1)	**Banks** (2-3)	None		137	12-12	0-4
Mar. 23	Texas State		Robert E. Heck Softball Complex • Decatur, GA	**L** 0-9	Mullins (8-2)	**Buck** (3-3)	None		131	12-13	0-5
Mar. 24	Texas State		Robert E. Heck Softball Complex • Decatur, GA	**L** 5-10	Mullins (9-2)	**Mooney** (4-5)	None		153	12-14	0-6
Mar. 26	at Appalachian State		Sywassink/Lloyd Family Stadium • Boone, NC	**L** 5-6	Longanecker (8-3)	**Doolittle** (0-1)	None	ESPN+	50	12-15	0-7
Mar. 28	at Appalachian State		Sywassink/Lloyd Family Stadium • Boone, NC	Game Cancelled due to threat of inclement weather in Boone							
Mar. 28	at Appalachian State		Sywassink/Lloyd Family Stadium • Boone, NC	Game Cancelled due to threat of inclement weather in Boone							

April (2–9)
Date	Opponent	Rank	Site/stadium	Score	Win	Loss	Save	TV	Attendance	Overall record	SBC record
Apr. 2	No. 16 Louisiana		Robert E. Heck Softball Complex • Decatur, GA	**L** 2-10 (5 inns)	Ellyson (8-4)	**Doolittle** (0-2)	None		125	12-16	0-8
Apr. 2	No. 16 Louisiana		Robert E. Heck Softball Complex • Decatur, GA	**L** 0-4	Lamb (12-2)	**Mooney** (4-6)	None		125	12-17	0-9
Apr. 3	No. 16 Louisiana		Robert E. Heck Softball Complex • Decatur, GA	**L** 1-13 (5 inns)	Ellyson (9-4)	**Mooney** (4-7)	None		127	12-18	0-10
Apr. 7	Mercer		Robert E. Heck Softball Complex • Decatur, GA	Game Postponed							
Apr. 7	Mercer		Robert E. Heck Softball Complex • Decatur, GA	Game Postponed							
Apr. 10	at UT Arlington		Allan Saxe Field • Arlington, TX	**W** 2-0	**Mooney** (5-7)	Valencia (2-3)	None		156	13-18	1-10
Apr. 10	at UT Arlington		Allan Saxe Field • Arlington, TX	**L** 2-7	Henriksen (2-3)	**Doolittle** (0-3)	None		156	13-19	1-11
Apr. 11	at UT Arlington		Allan Saxe Field • Arlington, TX	**L** 1-3	Valencia (3-3)	**Buck** (3-4)	Gardiner (3)		156	13-20	1-12
Apr. 14	RV Auburn		Robert E. Heck Softball Complex • Decatur, GA	**L** 1-4	Lowe (11-3)	**Mooney** (5-8)	Dismukes (4)		237	13-21	
Apr. 17	Coastal Carolina		Robert E. Heck Softball Complex • Decatur, GA	**W** 3-2 (9 inns)	**Mooney** (6-8)	Beasley-Polko (6-8)	None		213	14-21	2-12
Apr. 17	Coastal Carolina		Robert E. Heck Softball Complex • Decatur, GA	**L** 3-6	Brabham (4-5)	**Doolittle** (0-4)	None		213	14-22	2-13
Apr. 18	Coastal Carolina		Robert E. Heck Softball Complex • Decatur, GA	**L** 7-8	Beasley-Polko (7-8)	**Freeman** (2-3)	None		217	14-23	2-14
Apr. 21	at Kennesaw State		Bailey Softball Complex • Kennesaw, GA	**L** 0-8 (5 inns)	Bennett (15-9)	**Mooney** (6-9)	None	ESPN+	100	14-24	

May (1-4)
Date	Opponent	Rank	Site/stadium	Score	Win	Loss	Save	TV	Attendance	Overall record	SBC record
May 1	at Louisiana–Monroe		Geo-Surfaces Field at the ULM Softball Complex • Monroe, LA	**L** 1-2	Hulett (5-6)	**Mooney** (2-4)	None	ESPN+		14-25	2-15
May 1	at Louisiana–Monroe		Geo-Surfaces Field at the ULM Softball Complex • Monroe, LA	**W** 2-1	**Freeman** (3-3)	Hulett (5-7)	**Buck** (2)		271	15-25	3-15
May 2	at Louisiana–Monroe		Geo-Surfaces Field at the ULM Softball Complex • Monroe, LA	Game cancelled due to threat of inclement weather							
May 6	Georgia Southern		Robert E. Heck Softball Complex • Decatur, GA	**L** 4-5	Richardson (4-5)	**Mooney** (6-11)	None		283	15-26	3-16
May 7	Georgia Southern		Robert E. Heck Softball Complex • Decatur, GA	**L** 7-11 (8 inns)	Rewis (3-2)	**Banks** (2-4)	None		285	15-27	3-17
May 7	Georgia Southern		Robert E. Heck Softball Complex • Decatur, GA	**L** 4-9	Garcia (7-6)	**Doolittle** (0-5)	None		285	15-28	3-18

Post-Season (1-2)

SBC tournament (1-2)
Date	Opponent	(Seed)/Rank	Site/stadium	Score	Win	Loss	Save	TV	Attendance	Overall record	SBC record
May 11	vs. (7) Georgia Southern	(10)	Troy Softball Complex • Troy, AL	**W** 4-1	**Mooney** (7-11)	Garcia (7-7)	None	ESPN+	97	16-28	
May 12	vs. (2) Texas State	(10)	Troy Softball Complex • Troy, AL	**L** 0-2	Mullins (20-6)	**Allen** (1-2)	None	ESPN+	121	16-29	
May 13	vs. (5) Appalachian State	(10)	Troy Softball Complex • Troy, AL	**L** 1-2	Holland (8-6)	**Mooney** (7-12)	None	ESPN+	104	16-30	

Schedule source:

*Rankings are based on the team's current ranking in the NFCA/USA Softball poll.
