= Gerry Glasco =

American college softball coach

Current position
- Title: Head coach
- Team: Texas Tech
- Conference: Big 12
- Record: 115–24 (.827)

Biographical details
- Born: October 29, 1958 (age 68); Macomb, Illinois, U.S.
- Education: University of Illinois at Urbana–Champaign

Coaching career (HC unless noted)
- 2000–2004, 2007–2008: Johnston City HS (varsity asst.)
- 2002–2008: ASA 18U Southern Force Gold
- 2008: Johnston City HS (JV)
- 2009–2011: Georgia (asst.)
- 2012–2014: Georgia (assoc. HC)
- 2014, 2019: USSSA Pride
- 2015–2017: Texas A&M (assoc. HC)
- 2018–2024: Louisiana
- 2022–2023: Smash It Sports Vipers
- 2025–present: Texas Tech

Head coaching record
- Overall: College: 354–102 (.776); Professional: 96–46 (.676)
- Tournaments: NPF Championship Tournament: 11–1 (.917); NCAA Division I: 18–8 (.692)

Accomplishments and honors

Championships
- 3× Cowles Cup (2014, 2017, 2019); 7× Sun Belt Conference Regular Season Champions (2018, 2019, 2020, 2021, 2022, 2023, 2024); 4× Sun Belt Conference Tournament Champions (2019, 2021, 2022, 2023); 2x Big 12 Conference Regular Season Champions (2025, 2026); Big 12 Conference Tournament Champions (2025); WCWS Runner-Up (2025, 2026)

Awards
- As a Head Coach: 2× Sun Belt Coach of the Year (2019, 2021); 2x Big 12 Coach of the Year (2025, 2026); As an Assistant: NFCA South Region Coaching Staff of the Year (2017)

Gerald Dean Glasco Jr. (born October 29, 1958) is an American college softball coach who is currently head coach at Texas Tech and the Smash It Sports Vipers of the Women's Professional Fastpitch (WPF). Previously, Glasco was a high school softball coach, an assistant at Georgia and Texas A&M, and head coach for the USSSA Pride and Scrap Yard Dawgs of the National Pro Fastpitch (NPF).

== Early life and education ==
Glasco was born in 1958 in Macomb, Illinois. He attended high school at Crab Orchard High School where he lettered in baseball and basketball. He attended college at the University of Illinois Urbana-Champaign and earned a bachelor's degree in Agricultural Economics.

== Coaching career ==
=== High school and travel ball (2000–2008) ===
From 2000 to 2004 and 2007 to 2008 at Johnston City High School in Johnston City, Illinois, Glasco was varsity assistant softball coach; he was also junior varsity head coach in 2008. During his time there, Glasco created the Illinois Southern Force 18U ASA team, for which he served as the head coach from 2002 to 2008. His team finished in the Top 20 four times at the ASA Gold Nationals and won the championship in 2004. That year, Glasco and his coaching staff were named the National Coaching Staff of the Year for travel softball teams by the NFCA.

=== College assistant (2009–2017) ===
Glasco started his collegiate career in softball at Georgia as assistant head coach and recruiting coordinator from 2009 to 2011. During his time at Georgia, he brought his team to a 282–92 cumulative record, topping NCAA and SEC rankings in almost all offensive categories and setting over 20 team records. In 2012, Glasco was promoted to associate head coach, a position that he held until 2014.

In 2014, Glasco joined Texas A&M as associate head coach. In the 2016 and 2017 seasons, the Aggies led the SEC in home run in regular season conference play. In 2017, the Aggies had their best SEC Conference finish ever with a 16–7 conference record and advanced to the Women's College World Series.

=== Louisiana (2018–2024) ===
After firing former head coach Michael Lotief for alleged abusive conduct, the University of Louisiana at Lafayette hired Glasco as head coach for the Louisiana Ragin' Cajuns softball team on November 20, 2017. At the time of his hire, Glasco had been associate head coach at Auburn. In his first season as head coach, Glasco led Louisiana to a 41–16 record, including a 3–2 record in the NCAA Tournament that had both a 5–4 upset win and loss in the regional final to host LSU. The 2019 season ended in similar heartbreak after Louisiana defeated Southeast Missouri State and Ole Miss in the Oxford Regional to lose to Ole Miss 1–5 and force a game 7. In the game 7, the Cajuns would rally back from a 0–3 deficit to be 4–3, then eventually lose when Ole Miss would score 2 in the 7th inning. Following a shortened 2020 COVID-19 season, the Cajuns would repeat back-to-back as both conference regular season and tournament champions with appearances in the 2021 Baton Rouge Regionals and the 2022 Clemson Regionals.

Glasco finished his tenure with the Louisiana Ragin' Cajuns, where he compiled a 300–88 record in seven years, securing five Sun Belt Conference regular-season titles and advanced to the NCAA Tournament each year.

=== Texas Tech (2025–present) ===
On June 20, 2024, Glasco was named the head coach at Texas Tech. During the 2025 NCAA Division I softball season, the Red Raiders advanced to the 2025 Women's College World Series for the first time in program history.

=== Professional ===
Glasco has been a head coach with National Pro Fastpitch (NPF) three times, first for USSSA Pride in 2014 then the Scrap Yard Dawgs in 2017, and again for USSSA Pride in 2019. All three teams won the NPF's Cowles Cup championship. Glasco also currently serves as the head coach for the Smash It Sports Vipers of the WPF an offspring of the NPF.

== Head coaching record ==
The following table shows Glasco's record as a college head coach.

Record table
Season	Team	Overall	Conference	Standing	Postseason
Louisiana Ragin' Cajuns (Sun Belt Conference) (2018–2024)
2018	Louisiana	41–16	21–6	1st	NCAA Regional
2019	Louisiana	52–6	25–0	1st	NCAA Regional
2020	Louisiana	18–6	2–1		Season canceled due to the COVID-19 pandemic
2021	Louisiana	47–12	21–3	1st	NCAA Regional
2022	Louisiana	47–13	23–4	1st	NCAA Regional
2023	Louisiana	50–16	22–2	1st	NCAA Super Regionals
2024	Louisiana	45–19	22–2	1st	NCAA Regional
Louisiana:		300–88 (.773)	136–18 (.883)		
Texas Tech Red Raiders (Big 12 Conference) (2025–present)
2025	Texas Tech	54–14	20–4	1st	WCWS Runner-Up
2026	Texas Tech	61–10	21–3	1st	WCWS Runner-Up
Texas Tech:		115–24 (.827)	41–7 (.854)		
Total:		415–112 (.787)			
National champion Postseason invitational champion Conference regular season champion Conference regular season and conference tournament champion Division regular season champion Division regular season and conference tournament champion Conference tournament champion

== Personal life ==
Glasco is married to Vickie Glasco and has three daughters, all of whom have been involved in softball, including Tara Glasco Archibald who is Associate Head Coach for the Texas Tech Red Raiders. She previously served as the Head Coach at Eastern Illinois University in Charleston, Illinois and was formerly the assistant coach at Illinois State 2017-2019. His daughter Erin Glasco Simons played softball at Texas A&M University.

In 2019, Glasco's daughter Geri Ann Glasco, who had just been hired as a Volunteer Assistant Coach at Louisiana, was killed in a car accident in Lafayette, Louisiana.
