= Pre-game ceremony =

Sporting Tradition

A pre-game ceremony or pre-match ceremony is an on-field ceremony occurring before a sporting event. Such ceremonies may celebrate a past event, honour a retiring athlete, commemorate a deceased athlete, or promote a cause.

== Celebrating past events ==
Ceremonies preceding a game may celebrate a past event, such as a team championship. Such ceremonies may include appearances from members from the championship team. For example, in the last weekend of May 2016, the New York Mets of Major League Baseball hosted a 30th anniversary celebration of the 1986 World Series winning team. Among the invited participants were Davey Johnson, the team's manager in 1986, and all players of that team.

== Celebrating athletes ==
A sport franchise may schedule a pre-game ceremony to celebrate the retirement of a popular long-successful athlete, to retire an athlete's uniform number, to honour a deceased athlete, or to celebrate an athlete's accomplishments.

=== Accomplishments ===
A pre-game ceremony may be held to celebrate the accomplishments of an athlete. On 30 September 2017, the Kansas City Royals hosted a pre-game ceremony preceding their game against the Arizona Diamondbacks to celebrate Mike Moustakas setting a team record for home runs in one season.

Preceding the 11 December 2019 game in which the Toronto Raptors hosted the Los Angeles Clippers, former Raptors player Kawhi Leonard was presented with a ring to celebrate the Raptors championship in the preceding NBA season.

=== Death ===
After the death of Miami Marlins pitcher José Fernández in a boating accident in September 2016, a Major League Baseball executive announced that all games scheduled for that day would be preceded by a pre-game moment of silence to commemorate Fernández.

Similarly, in the Australian Football League (AFL), after Adelaide Football Club coach Phil Walsh was murdered mid-season by his son in 2015, Adelaide's next scheduled game was called off, and all other games for the round forgoed a banner and club songs; additionally, a minute's silence was observed, and all players wore a black armband.

=== Retirement ===
In September 2014, the New York Yankees hosted a ceremony preceding a game against the Kansas City Royals for Derek Jeter, who retired from baseball at the end of the 2014 Major League Baseball season. The Yankees invited Jeter's extended family, numerous members of Jeter's charity Turn 2 Foundation, former teammates, Jeter's childhood idol Dave Winfield, and other athletes including Reggie Jackson, Cal Ripken Jr., and Michael Jordan. The team even had astronauts on the International Space Station performing the "RE2PECT" cap tip. The latter part of the ceremony was used to present Jeter with gifts and a donation to his charity.

The Boston Red Sox held a 40-minute ceremony for David Ortiz preceding the final game of the team's 2016 season against the Toronto Blue Jays. Announced during the ceremony was that his uniform number 34 would be retired by the Red Sox during the 2017 season. Invited guests included the President of the Dominican Republic Danilo Medina, the Governor of Massachusetts Charlie Baker, Boston mayor Marty Walsh, and 24 teammates from the Boston Red Sox 2004, 2007, and 2013 World Series championship teams of which he was a member. He also received gifts, and the Red Sox Foundation and team owners donated $1 million to the David Ortiz Children's Fund.

=== Uniform number retirement ===
On 27 November 2008, the Oshawa Generals of the Ontario Hockey League had a pre-game ceremony that lasted fifty minutes to retire the uniform number of Bobby Orr, a player who "left an indelible imprint on the franchise". Among attendees and speakers were Don Cherry, former Generals teammate Ian Young, and Wren Blair, the scout who signed him for the Boston Bruins of the National Hockey League.

== Opening ceremonies ==
In 1889, the original Polo Grounds in New York City was demolished, and for part of the 1889 season, the New York Giants were a vagabond team playing in various stadiums (including Oakland Park and the St. George Cricket Grounds), until the New Polo Grounds was completed. On 8 July, the new stadium was opened with a pre-game opening ceremony featuring a military band and a number of politicians.

== Advocacy ==
Advocacy or promotion of charitable and non-profit programs may also be presented during pre-game ceremonies. For example, in November 2016 the Ottawa Senators held a ceremony to promote cancer research and patient care fundraising for The Ottawa Hospital.

== Politics ==
Before the first game of the 1972 ice hockey Summit Series between Canada and the Soviet Union in Montreal, a pre-game ceremony was held in which there was an exchange of gifts. Before the eighth and final game of the series in Moscow, by which time there was a tense relationship between the Canadians and Soviets, the Canadian delegation had intended on presenting the Soviet team with a totem pole in a pre-game ceremony; the presentation was cancelled by the Soviets, but later restored.

After the 2001 September 11 attacks, the New York Mets hosted their first game in New York City on 21 September, in which a pre-game ceremony included members of the New York Police Department and New York City Fire Department, and featured Diana Ross singing "God Bless America" and a salute to the victims of the attacks and their families. Members of the New York Police Department and New York City Fire Department were also present at the first game of the New York Giants of the National Football League following the attacks, on 23 September in Kansas City.

== Law ==
Some pre-game ceremonies have been subject to legal challenges. Up to 1995, the Santa Fe Independent School District in Santa Fe, Texas had the student council chaplain, an elective student office position, recite a prayer over the stadium public address system preceding each football game. School representatives stated that because the same student recited the prayer throughout the year, it was protected as private speech by the Free Exercise Clause of the First Amendment to the United States Constitution. In Santa Fe Independent School District v. Doe, the Court of Appeal decision stated that the school policy was invalid because it violated the Establishment Clause of the First Amendment to the United States Constitution. Specifically, the school had not created a limited private forum for the prayer recital, and a majoritarian student body election to determine which activities are granted approval is "constitutionally problematic" since "minority candidates will never prevail".

== See also ==
- Ceremonial first pitch
- Ceremonial first puck

== Notes ==
[[#ref_a|^At the time, the Oshawa Generals were in the Metro Junior A League.]]
