= List of mass shootings in the United States in 2018 =

Mass shootings in the United States in 2018

This is a list of mass shootings in the United States that have occurred in 2018. Mass shootings are incidents involving multiple victims of firearm-related violence. The precise inclusion criteria are disputed, and there is no broadly accepted definition.

Gun Violence Archive, a nonprofit research group that tracks shootings and their characteristics in the United States, defines a mass shooting as an incident in which four or more people, excluding the perpetrator(s), are shot in one location at roughly the same time. The Congressional Research Service narrows that definition, limiting it to "public mass shootings", defined by four or more victims killed, excluding any victims who survive. The Washington Post and Mother Jones use similar definitions, with the latter acknowledging that their definition "is a conservative measure of the problem", as many shootings with fewer fatalities occur. The crowdsourced Mass Shooting Tracker project has the most expansive definition of four or more shot in any incident, including the perpetrator in the victim inclusion criteria.

There were 323 mass shootings in 2018 that fit the inclusion criteria of this article, resulting in 387 deaths and 1,283 injuries, for a total of 1,670 victims.

== Definitions ==
There are many definitions of a mass shooting. Listed roughly from most broad to most restrictive:

Mass Shooting Tracker: 4+ shot in one incident, at one location, at roughly the same time.
Gun Violence Archive/Vox: 4+ shot in one incident, excluding the perpetrator(s), at one location, at roughly the same time.
Mother Jones: 3+ shot and killed in one incident, excluding the perpetrator(s), at a public place, excluding gang-related killings.
The Washington Post: 4+ shot and killed in one incident, excluding the perpetrator(s), at a public place, excluding gang-related killings.
Congressional Research Service: 4+ shot and killed in one incident, excluding the perpetrator(s), at a public place, excluding gang-related killings, acts carried out that were inspired by criminal profit, and terrorism.

Only incidents considered mass shootings by at least two of the above sources are listed.

== List ==
A number n in brackets indicates that it was the nth mass shooting in that community in the year.

Date	Community	Dead	Injured	Total	Description
December 31, 2018	Cleveland, Ohio (5)	3	2	5	A dispute began at a rented Airbnb during a New Year's Eve party. Three men were killed and another man and woman were wounded.
December 29, 2018	Lima, Ohio (2)	1	3	4	One person was killed and three people were wounded in a shooting at an afterhours club.
December 28, 2018	St. Charles, Missouri	4	1 (Note: Including the perpetrator or suspect)	5	A gunman shot and killed his girlfriend, her two children, and her mother. He was arrested after exchanging fire with police and attempting to carjack a vehicle. The shooter was given the death penalty in 2022.
December 24, 2018	Lutcher, Louisiana	2	2	4	Three people were killed and two others were wounded in a shooting outside of a bar.
December 23, 2018	Springfield, Missouri (2)	0	7	7	Seven people were wounded during a shooting at a holiday party.
December 22, 2018	Las Vegas, Nevada (2)	0	4	4	Four people were wounded during a shooting at a holiday party.
December 18, 2018	Baltimore, Maryland (4)	0	5	5	Five people were injured in a shooting outside a deli.
December 15, 2018	Miami, Florida (5)	0	5	5	Five people were wounded in a shooting.
December 14, 2018	Colorado Springs, Colorado (2)	1	3	4	One person was killed and three others were injured in a shooting near the Colorado Springs Airport.
December 13, 2018	Philadelphia, Pennsylvania (10)	0	4	4	Four men were injured in a shooting that occurred inside a barbershop. The suspect evaded police but the weapon was recovered.
December 11, 2018	Natachitoches, Louisiana	1	3	4	One person was killed and three others were wounded in a shooting just before midnight.
December 9, 2018	Madison, Wisconsin	0	4	4	Four people were injured by gunfire inside a strip club following a fight. The perpetrator was also stabbed.
December 9, 2018	Laurinburg, North Carolina	1	3	4	One person was killed and three others were wounded in a shooting.
December 8, 2018	New York City, New York (6)	0	5	5	Five people were wounded outside of a nightclub in Queens after a dispute inside the club.
December 1, 2018	Miami, Florida (4)	0	5	5	Five people were wounded in a shooting in the Overtown neighborhood of Miami.
November 26, 2018	Powell, Tennessee	0	4	4	Four people were wounded in a shooting. Two suspects were taken into custody by police.
November 25, 2018	Houston, Texas (4)	1	6	7	A thirteen-year-old boy was killed and six other people were injured in a shooting at a block party. At least two shooters were involved, and police believe it may have been gang-related.
November 25, 2018	Demopolis, Alabama	2	2	4	Two people were killed and two others were wounded in a shooting at an intersection.
November 25, 2018	Oakland, California (4)	0	4	4	Four people were wounded in a drive-by shooting while attending a vigil for a resident of their area who had died of natural causes.
November 24, 2018	Orlando, Florida (4)	2	2	4	Two people were killed and two others were wounded in a shooting outside a pizza shop. A suspect was taken into custody by police.
November 23, 2018	Miami, Florida (3)	2	2	4	Two people were killed and five others were wounded in a shooting outside of a convenience store. Two of the injured were hit with bullets, the other three were injured in other ways.
November 22, 2018	Fort Wayne, Indiana	3	2	5	Three people were killed and two others were injured in a home invasion shooting. One person was arrested the next day, and police suspect another person was involved.
November 21, 2018	St. Louis, Missouri (9)	0	4	4	Four people were injured in a shooting in the Penrose neighborhood of St. Louis.
November 19, 2018	Denver, Colorado (2)	1	3	4	One person was killed and three others were injured in a shooting in the LoDo neighborhood.
November 19, 2018	Philadelphia, Pennsylvania (9)	4	0	4	Four people were discovered shot execution style in the head in a basement of a home. 2 men was sentenced in 2020 for the crime.
November 18, 2018	Los Angeles, California (6)	1	3	4	A man killed his girlfriend and wounded his uncle and grandmother in a shooting in Watts, Los Angeles. The shooter was also injured, either during a confrontation with police or by a self-inflicted gunshot.
November 16, 2018	Little Rock, Arkansas	3	1	4	Police found a boy suffering from gunshot injuries, then discovered a car that had crashed into a ditch. Inside the car were three people who had all been shot and killed.
November 16, 2018	Wheatland, Wisconsin	1	3	4	Two people were shot inside a home, and two others were shot at a gas station. One of the victims later died of their injuries.
November 14, 2018	Baton Rouge, Louisiana	3	1	4	Three people were killed and one person was injured in a shooting.
November 13, 2018	Indianapolis, Indiana (3)	2	2	4	A man killed one person and wounded two others after shooting them during what police believe to be a drug robbery. the perpetrator was shot and killed by an armed person.
November 13, 2018	Tsayatoh, New Mexico	4	1	5	A person killed three people and injured a fourth before killing themself in a residence in an apparent murder–suicide.
November 12, 2018	Dunn, North Carolina	3	1	4	A man killed three people and injured one in a shooting after a fight at a home. The shooter was arrested after crashing a vehicle he stole from the scene. The shooter was given three life sentences in 2019.
November 11, 2018	Globe, Arizona	3	1	4	Globe, Arizona shooting: Three people were killed and one injured when a man began firing at 5 individuals at a bar following a pool game. The suspect was arrested.
November 11, 2018	Robbins, Illinois	1	4	5	Shooting of Jemel Roberson: A man re-entered a bar after being ejected and began to fire, wounding three people and becoming injured himself. Armed security guards apprehended the suspect. Responding officers saw one of the security guards with a gun, and shot and killed him.
November 10, 2018	Memphis, Tennessee (8)	2	4	6	Two people were killed and four people were wounded when they were shot after an argument over gambling.
November 7, 2018	Thousand Oaks, California	13	16 (Note: 1 injured by gunfire)	29	Thousand Oaks shooting: A man entered a bar hosting a student line-dancing event and killed twelve people, including a police officer. Sixteen other people were injured, one of them by gunfire. The gunman then killed himself.
November 3, 2018	Watertown, New York	0	5	5	Five people were wounded in a shooting outside of a nightclub. The suspect was taken into custody by police.
November 2, 2018	Long Beach, California	0	4	4	Four people were injured in a shooting in North Long Beach. Police suspect the incident was gang-related.
November 2, 2018	Tallahassee, Florida	3	5 (Note: Four injured by gunfire)	8	2018 Tallahassee shooting: A gunman killed two women and injured five others; four by gunfire, one by being pistol-whipped, at a yoga studio before killing himself in a murder–suicide.
November 1, 2018	Minneapolis, Minnesota (2)	0	5	5	An argument evolved into a shooting that left five people wounded.
November 1, 2018	Springfield, Missouri (1)	2	2	4	Two men were killed and two other people were wounded in a shooting at a home.
October 31, 2018	Detroit, Michigan (5)	1	3	4	A fifteen-year-old boy was killed and three other people were wounded in a shooting at a home after a robbery.
October 30, 2018	Vallejo, California (2)	2	3	5	Two people were killed and three others were wounded in a shooting.
October 30, 2018	Los Angeles, California (5)	0	5	5	Five people were injured in a drive-by shooting in South Los Angeles.
October 29, 2018	Riverside, California	0	7	7	Seven people were wounded in a shooting following a fight at a nightclub.
October 28, 2018	El Dorado, Arkansas	2	2	4	Two people were killed and two were injured in a shooting at a home.
October 27, 2018	Pittsburgh, Pennsylvania (2)	11	6	17	Pittsburgh synagogue shooting: A man opened fire in the Tree of Life synagogue in an antisemitic attack, killing eleven people and injuring six others (including four police officers). The suspect was taken into custody by police.
October 27, 2018	Memphis, Tennessee (7)	0	5	5	Five people were wounded by several shooters at a high school Halloween party.
October 26, 2018	Jersey City, New Jersey (2)	1	3	4	A seventeen-year-old was killed and three other people were wounded in a shooting.
October 24, 2018	Chicago, Illinois (25)	0	5	5	Several gunmen wounded five people who were standing on a sidewalk.
October 22, 2018	Chicago, Illinois (24)	0	6	6	Six people were injured at a funeral service for Vantrease Criss, a rapper who was killed a week before.
October 21, 2018	Jacksonville, Florida (4)	0	6	6	Six people were injured in a drive-by shooting before an NFL game between the Houston Texans and the Jacksonville Jaguars. Those injured were between the ages of 20 and 70.
October 21, 2018	Lakewood, Washington	1	3	4	One person was killed and three were wounded after three gunmen began shooting at a nightclub following an argument.
October 16, 2018	Atlanta, Georgia (2)	0	4	4	Four people were injured in a drive-by shooting.
October 15, 2018	Columbia, Tennessee	5	0	5	A mother and four teenage children were found by an older brother in an apparent murder–suicide in which the mother is the reported perpetrator.
October 14, 2018	Fort Worth, Texas	0	4	4	Two children and two adults were injured in a drive-by shooting.
October 14, 2018	East Palo Alto, California	2	2	4	Two people were killed and two were injured in a shooting outside of a Halloween party.
October 14, 2018	North Las Vegas, Nevada (2)	3	1	4	Three people were killed and one was wounded after someone arguing with them outside a shopping center shot them and fled.
October 13, 2018	St. Louis, Missouri (8)	0	4	4	Four people were wounded near Glasgow Village when one or more people shot into a home.
October 13, 2018	Taft, Texas	4	1	5	A dispute at a one-year-old's birthday party, resulted in four men killed and one wounded. A suspect was indicted in 2019.
October 12, 2018	Spartanburg, South Carolina	0	6	6	Six people were injured in a shooting at a fast food restaurant. One suspect was arrested and another turned himself in to police. A third person is also suspected of being involved.
October 12, 2018	Las Vegas, Nevada (1)	0	4	4	Four people were wounded after being shot in central Las Vegas.
October 8, 2018	Birmingham, Alabama	0	4	4	Four people were injured when a person in a vehicle fired shots at them at an apartment complex.
October 6, 2018	Tulsa, Oklahoma	0	4	4	A man fired into a crowd outside a bar during a fight, injuring four people. Another person fired a gun into the air to try to stop the fight, but did not injure anyone.
October 6, 2018	Houston, Texas (3)	1	3	4	People began firing from a vehicle at people in a gas station parking lot, killing one person in a vehicle and wounding three others. The shooting is suspected to be gang-related.
October 6, 2018	Oakland, California (3)	0	6 (Note: Including at least one of the perpetrators)	6	Two men began shooting during a dispute, injuring six people in total including each other. Both men were arrested.
October 4, 2018	Española, New Mexico	1	3	4	Several people began firing at teenagers in a car, killing one and wounding three. Police believe they were targeting people with whom they had been in a dispute on social media, and that the teenagers were mistakenly targeted. Seven suspects were arrested on various charges related to the shooting, including three people charged with first-degree murder.
October 4, 2018	Swainsboro, Georgia	0	4	4	Four people were wounded when they were injured in a gang-related shooting.
October 3, 2018	Florence, South Carolina	2	6	8	Florence, South Carolina shooting: Officers were shot at during a two-hour standoff while attempting to execute a search warrant in which the perpetrator held children hostage, killing two and wounding six before being arrested.
October 3, 2018	Philadelphia, Pennsylvania (8)	1	4	5	One person was killed and four others were injured in a drive-by shooting outside of a store.
October 1, 2018	Chicago, Illinois (23)	2	2	4	A man began firing a gun inside a vehicle, killing two passengers and wounding another passenger and the driver. He was arrested.
September 24, 2018	Memphis, Tennessee (6)	3	2	5	A fight at an apartment complex, reportedly got out of control and three people were killed and two women wounded.
September 21, 2018	Aberdeen, Maryland	4	3	7	Aberdeen, Maryland Shooting: An employee of the Rite Aid Distribution facility killed three victims before wounding herself. The shooter died later in the hospital.
September 20, 2018	Masontown, Pennsylvania	1	4	5	A gunman opened fire in a municipal building and wounded four people before being shot by officer who responded to the incident.
September 17, 2018	Silver Spring, Maryland	4	1	5	A father shot and killed his wife and two children, and injured his adult stepdaughter, before he committed suicide.
September 12, 2018	Bakersfield, California	6	0	6	A gunman opened fire at three locations after following a witness to another store and then to a private home. He killed two women and three men before carjacking a woman and child, and committing suicide when police approached.
September 6, 2018	Cincinnati, Ohio (2)	4	2	6	Fifth Third Center Shooting: A gunman entered a loading dock at the Fifth Third Center skyscraper and opened fire before entering the lobby of a building. Four people, including the shooter, were killed and two were injured.
September 9, 2018	Auburn, Alabama	1	4	5	A teen opened fire at a McDonald's and left 1 dead and 4 injured.
September 2, 2018	San Bernardino, California (2)	0	8	8	Eight people were wounded during a shooting at a dice game at an apartment complex.
September 1, 2018	Cleveland, Ohio (4)	1	7	8	Eight people were shot at a nightclub. Police arrived and found a woman with a gunshot wound to the head at the back of the bar. She later died at a hospital.
August 27, 2018	Pine Bluff, Arkansas (2)	1	3	4	An unidentified individual fired from a vehicle on a group of people standing outside a home, killing one and injuring three.
August 26, 2018	Jacksonville, Florida (3)	3	11 (Note: 9 injured by gunfire)	14	Jacksonville Landing Shooting: A gunman killed two people and wounded eleven more at a Madden NFL 19 competition before killing himself. The shooter was identified as David Katz, an individual who had reportedly been eliminated from the competition before the shooting.
August 26, 2018	Wichita Falls, Texas	1	3	4	One person was killed and three others were wounded inside a residence. Authorities took a man into custody in connection with the shooting. According to reports, the deceased victim was shot in the chest.
August 25, 2018	Nashville, Tennessee (3)	1	4	5	Two gunmen reportedly shot five people outside a residence. One victim was shot in the chest and later died at Vanderbilt University Medical Center.
August 25, 2018	Richmond, Virginia (2)	0	6 (Note: 5 injured by gunfire)	6	Five people were shot and wounded during an armed robbery of Liquid Café. One other individual had an unspecified injury "by other means" than gunfire.
August 23, 2018	Philadelphia, Pennsylvania (7)	0	4	4	Four people were injured during a shooting in the Oxford Circle neighborhood of Philadelphia.
August 22, 2018	St. Louis, Missouri (7)	0	4	4	Rapper YK Osiris's tour van "came under fire" on I-64 after a concert at around 11:05 PM. Four people were injured. YK Osiris himself was not shot.
August 21, 2018	Memphis, Tennessee (5)	0	6	6	Six people were wounded by gunfire in a shooting outside of an apartment complex, following a large fight in the same location the previous day. One of the wounded men was arrested, but charges against him were later dropped.
August 20, 2018	Jackson, Tennessee	1	4	5	Five people were injured in a shooting at a bar. One of the victims later died of his injuries.
August 20, 2018	Cleveland, Ohio (3)	1	3	4	A fight over drugs resulted in one person being killed and three others being wounded.
August 19, 2018	Chicago, Illinois (22)	0	5	5	Five were wounded in a shooting after a softball game in the Grand Crossing neighborhood of Chicago.
August 19, 2018	Detroit, Michigan (4)	1	3	4	One person was killed and three others were wounded in a drive-by shooting at a family gathering.
August 18, 2018	Trenton, New Jersey (2)	0	5 (Note: 4 injured by gunfire)	5	Four people were wounded by gunfire following an event where school supplies were distributed to children. A fifth person, a child, received minor injuries after being struck by a dirt bike operated by one of the attackers.
August 18, 2018	New York City, New York (5)	0	4	4	Four people were injured during gunfire during a drive-by shooting following a fight in a Bronx lounge.
August 17, 2018	Chicago, Illinois (21)	0	7	7	Seven people were wounded in a shooting in the Englewood neighborhood of Chicago.
August 15, 2018	Greenwood, South Carolina	0	5	5	Five people were injured when they were shot during a backyard gathering to mourn the death of a family member who had died in a car accident earlier that month.
August 14, 2018	Wyncote, Pennsylvania	0	5	5	After a dispute at a grocery store checkout line, a man pulled a handgun from his sister's waistband and wounded five people. The suspect was arrested.
August 12, 2018	Clearlake, California	4	1	5	A father killed three of his children and wounded the fourth before killing himself.
August 12, 2018	Pittsburgh, Pennsylvania (1)	0	4	4	A woman shot and injured four people in a street fight in the East Liberty neighborhood of Pittsburgh. She later turned herself in to police.
August 11, 2018	Columbus, Ohio	0	4	4	Two adults and two children were wounded in a shooting at a party at a park in north Columbus.
August 11, 2018	San Francisco, California (3)	1	4	5	One person was killed and four others were shot in an early-morning shooting in the Crocker-Amazon neighborhood of San Francisco.
August 11, 2018	Thornton, Colorado	1	3	4	After being kicked out of a sports bar following several fights, a man returned with a gun and killed a bartender. Three others were wounded by gunfire. The shooter was taken into custody.
August 10, 2018	St. Louis, Missouri (6)	0	4	4	A man wounded four people at a gas station after shooting at them from his truck. He was arrested by police.
August 10, 2018	Detroit, Michigan (3)	0	4	4	Four people were wounded by a gunman who was later taken into custody.
August 8, 2018	Paterson, New Jersey	0	4	4	Four people were wounded by a gunman.
August 8, 2018	Philadelphia, Pennsylvania (6)	2	4	6	Two people were killed and four were injured in a drive-by shooting in North Philadelphia.
August 5, 2018	Chicago, Illinois (20)	1	4	5	One person was killed and four were injured in the Austin neighborhood of Chicago.
August 5, 2018	Chicago, Illinois (19)	0	4	4	Four people were wounded at Humboldt Park when they were shot at by two people in a car.
August 5, 2018	Chicago, Illinois (18)	0	4	4	Four people were wounded by gunfire at a house party.
August 5, 2018	Chicago, Illinois (17)	0	8	8	Eight people were wounded when a group of men approached them in a courtyard and began shooting.
August 5, 2018	Chicago, Illinois (16)	1	5	6	Two shooters killed one person and wounded five others when they began shooting at a group standing on a sidewalk.
August 4, 2018	Kansas City, Missouri	0	6	6	Six people were shot when a man pulled a handgun from his waistband during a fight. The suspect was taken into custody.
August 4, 2018	North Las Vegas, Nevada (1)	0	6	6	Six people were injured during a shooting at a house party.
August 4, 2018	Chicago, Illinois (15)	1	3	4	One person was killed and three were injured in the Austin neighborhood of Chicago.
August 4, 2018	Milwaukee, Wisconsin	0	4	4	Four people were injured when a gunman began shooting from a car at a group of people who were grilling and playing basketball in a park.
July 31, 2018	Gardena, California	3	2	5	After becoming upset at a party, a man fatally shot two people and wounded two others, including his girlfriend. He was driven from the scene by his friend and his friend's wife. He later shot and killed his friend, but his attempt to kill his friend's wife failed when his gun malfunctioned. The shooter was sentenced to life imprisonment.
July 30, 2018	Savannah, Georgia	0	4	4	Four people were injured when shots were fired during a dispute in a parking lot.
July 30, 2018	Chicago, Illinois (14)	0	4	4	Four people were injured in a drive-by shooting.
July 29, 2018	York, Pennsylvania	0	4	4	Four people were injured in a shooting.
July 29, 2018	Phoenix, Arizona	1	4	5	One person was killed and four were injured in a shooting following a verbal altercation at an inn.
July 29, 2018	Lansing, Michigan	0	4	4	Four people were injured when they were shot after a fight broke out.
July 28, 2018	New Orleans, Louisiana (6)	3	7	10	Two gunmen killed three people and injured seven others in a shooting at a daiquiri shop.
July 28, 2018	Los Angeles, California (4)	2	4	6	Two people were killed and six were injured in a drive-by shooting by a liquor store.
July 27, 2018	Chicago, Illinois (13)	0	4	4	Three children and an adult were injured in a shooting.
July 27, 2018	Robstown, Texas	5	0	5	A man killed his father and stepmother, as well as their adopted son and his stepmother's son, before killing himself in a murder–suicide at a nursing home.
July 26, 2018	Cleveland, Ohio (2)	1	6	7	One person was killed and six were injured in a shootout involving multiple gunmen at a bar after the filming of a rap music video.
July 26, 2018	Oakland, California (2)	2	2	4	A gunman shot at a moving car, killing two occupants and injuring the other two.
July 26, 2018	Dallas, Texas (2)	0	6	6	Six people were injured in a drive-by shooting.
July 25, 2018	New Orleans, Louisiana (5)	0	4	4	Four people were injured when a truck pulled up beside a car and one or more of its occupants began shooting. A suspect was arrested.
July 23, 2018	Chicago, Illinois (12)	0	5	5	Five people were wounded when someone began firing at them while they stood on a sidewalk.
July 21, 2018	Baltimore, Maryland (3)	0	4	4	Four people were wounded in a shooting.
July 21, 2018	Chicago, Illinois (11)	2	5	7	Two people were killed and five injured when they were shot by four gunmen in a park.
July 20, 2018	Sunnyside, Washington	1	4	5	One person was killed and four were injured after a shooter opened fire into a backyard party.
July 20, 2018	Elizabeth, New Jersey	0	4	4	Four people were wounded when three gunmen began shooting at them at a restaurant.
July 18, 2018	Oklahoma City, Oklahoma (2)	0	4	4	Four people were wounded when shots were fired during a large fight in an apartment complex. Four people were arrested on other charges, but the shooter or shooters were not identified.
July 16, 2018	Palm Beach Gardens, Florida (3)	2	4	6	Two people were killed and four others were injured when a gunman began shooting at them while they were standing in a yard.
July 16, 2018	Philadelphia, Pennsylvania (5)	1	4	5	Two gunmen killed one person and injured four others.
July 16, 2018	Washington, District of Columbia (5)	1	4	5	Masked men drove up in a car and began shooting into a crowd, killing a ten-year-old girl and injuring three others. Three people were arrested in relation to the shooting.
July 15, 2018	Denver, Colorado (1)	0	4	4	Four people were wounded during a shooting following a fight at a party.
July 15, 2018	Chattanooga, Tennessee	0	5	5	Five people were injured when a shooter fired into a group of people gathered in a parking lot outside a club.
July 14, 2018	Fort Washington, Maryland	0	4	4	Four people were injured in a shooting.
July 13, 2018	Richmond, Virginia (1)	1	3	4	One person was killed and three people were wounded in a shooting outside a nightclub in Scott's Addition.
July 12, 2018	Memphis, Tennessee (4)	0	5	5	Five people were wounded in a shooting near a community center. Police believe the shooting was spurred by an earlier fight over a dice game.
July 11, 2018	Houston, Texas (2)	0	4	4	Four people were injured in a drive-by shooting while they were inside their car at restaurant.
July 11, 2018	Reddick, Florida	0	4	4	Gunmen injured four people—two inside a mobile home, and two in separate vehicles outside of the home.
July 9, 2018	Prices Corner, Delaware	5	0	5	A man killed his wife and three children in their home before killing himself in a murder–suicide.
July 9, 2018	Orlando, Florida (3)	1	4	5	Following a fight, a man was killed and four other people were injured by gunshots. Two people were arrested.
July 8, 2018	Lowndes County, Alabama	0	6	6	Six people, including a suspect, were wounded during a shooting at a bar.
July 8, 2018	Memphis, Tennessee (3)	0	4	4	Four people were injured in a shooting.
July 7, 2018	Wetumpka, Alabama	3	2	5	A man killed his wife and one of his children and wounded his other two children before setting the house on fire and killing himself in a murder–suicide.
July 5, 2018	New York City, New York (4)	0	4	4	Four people were injured in Brooklyn when they were shot at while standing outside.
July 5, 2018	Albany, New York	0	4	4	Four people were injured in a shooting.
July 5, 2018	Los Angeles, California (3)	3	3	6	Three people were killed and three others were wounded during a Fourth of July party. Police believe the shooting was gang-related.
July 5, 2018	Virginia Beach, Virginia (2)	0	6	6	Six people were injured while walking down the street. A suspect was taken into custody.
July 5, 2018	Lima, Ohio (1)	1	5	6	One person was killed and five were injured in a shooting at a Fourth of July party.
July 4, 2018	Gary, Indiana (2)	1	3	4	One person was killed and three were wounded.
July 4, 2018	Atlanta, Georgia (1)	1	3	4	After a bar fight spilled into a parking lot, shots were fired, killing one person and wounding three others.
July 3, 2018	St. Louis, Missouri (5)	1	5	6	One person was killed and five others were wounded in a drive-by shooting.
July 3, 2018	Washington, District of Columbia (4)	0	4	4	Four people were injured in a shooting.
July 2, 2018	Buffalo, New York (3)	2	2	4	A woman and a 17-month-old child were killed in a shooting that injured two others. One person was taken into custody, although police suspect others were involved. Police believe the shooting was gang-related.
July 1, 2018	Chicago, Illinois (10)	0	6	6	Six people were injured when a gunman opened fire on three people on a sidewalk. In addition to the three people on the sidewalk, three children in a car were wounded.
June 30, 2018	Ashburn, Georgia	1	6	7	Several shooters fired into a crowd that was fleeing a nightclub, killing one person and injuring six. Police arrested one suspect, and believe the shooting was gang-related.
June 30, 2018	Baltimore, Maryland (2)	0	6	6	Six people were injured at a barbecue when an unknown person walked into the yard and began firing.
June 30, 2018	Jersey City, New Jersey (1)	0	5	5	Five people were injured when several people began exchanging gunfire. One suspect was arrested.
June 28, 2018	Annapolis, Maryland	5	2	7	Capital Gazette shooting: A gunman entered the offices of The Capital Gazette and killed five employees and wounded two others.
June 27, 2018	Oakland, California (1)	1	3	4	One person was killed and three were injured when at least one person began shooting at them outside a mini-mart.
June 27, 2018	San Antonio, Texas (2)	0	4	4	During an argument between neighbors, two people drew weapons and wounded four people. One suspect was arrested.
June 27, 2018	Hartford, Connecticut	0	4	4	Four victims were injured in a drive-by shooting outside a bodega.
June 25, 2018	Chicago, Illinois (9)	0	6	6	Six people were injured when a gunman began firing upon them as they stood near a park.
June 24, 2018	Sanford, North Carolina	1	6	7	One person was killed and six were injured during a fight at a birthday party. One of the wounded was arrested.
June 24, 2018	Punta Gorda, Florida	0	4	4	Four people were wounded when an uninvited guest at a birthday party at an event center began shooting.
June 24, 2018	Indiantown, Florida	0	4	4	Four people were injured in a shooting at a block party.
June 24, 2018	Palm Beach Gardens, Florida (2)	1	3	4	One person was killed and three were injured in a shooting. Six teenage suspects were arrested in relation to the shooting after leading police on a car chase.
June 24, 2018	Gary, Indiana (1)	1	3	4	One person was killed and three were wounded in a shooting.
June 24, 2018	Sandusky, Ohio	0	5	5	After several fights inside a bar led the bar owner to close for the night, the fights continued outside before escalating to a shooting in which five people were wounded.
June 23, 2018	Wichita, Kansas	0	4	4	Four people were injured in a gang-related shooting.
June 23, 2018	Chicago, Illinois (8)	1	4	5	One person was killed and four others were injured after being shot at from a vehicle.
June 23, 2018	Covington, Tennessee	0	4	4	Four people were injured in a shooting.
June 22, 2018	Homestead, Pennsylvania	1	3	4	One person was killed and three were injured when their car was shot at from another car.
June 21, 2018	San Bernardino, California (1)	1	3	4	One person was killed and three were wounded in a fight that progressed to a shooting outside of a liquor store.
June 21, 2018	Morganza, Louisiana	0	4	4	Four people were wounded in a shooting.
June 21, 2018	Chicago, Illinois (7)	0	4	4	Four people were wounded in a shooting.
June 20, 2018	Modesto, California (2)	0	5	5	Five people were injured when someone drew a gun and began shooting during a fight.
June 19, 2018	Huntsville, Alabama (2)	0	4	4	A man returned after an argument and wounded four people. He was later taken into custody.
June 18, 2018	Chicago, Illinois (6)	2	3	5	Two people were killed and three people were injured in a shooting after a fight at a party.
June 18, 2018	Bloomington, Illinois (2)	3	1	4	Three people were killed and a four-year-old child was wounded in a shooting.
June 17, 2018	Charlotte, North Carolina	0	4	4	Four people were injured in a shooting at a gas station.
June 17, 2018	Trenton, New Jersey (1)	1	22 (Note: 17 injured by gunfire)	23	Art All Night shooting: Multiple gunmen wounded 17 people at the Art All Night festival. Five others were wounded when they were trampled by people around them. One of the suspected gunmen was shot and killed by police. Police suspect the shooting was gang-related.
June 17, 2018	Macon, Georgia	1	3	4	A teenager was killed and three other people were injured in a drive-by shooting during a cookout. A 15-year-old was later charged with the killing.
June 17, 2018	Chicago, Illinois (5)	0	4	4	A gunman walked up to and wounded four people standing on the street.
June 14, 2018	Philadelphia, Pennsylvania (4)	0	4	4	Four people were injured in a shooting.
June 14, 2018	Union City, California	0	5	5	Five people were injured in a shooting that took place in a cemetery.
June 14, 2018	Tracy, California	1	4	5	A fight turned into a shooting that resulted in a 15-year-old being killed and four other people being injured.
June 14, 2018	Buffalo, New York (2)	1	4	5	One person was killed and four were wounded in a drive-by shooting.
June 14, 2018	Westminster, Colorado	1	3	4	A 13-year-old boy was killed, and his mother, 8-year-old brother, and a bystander were wounded in a road rage incident after the shooter followed them to the parking lot of a dentist's office. The shooter was arrested.
June 12, 2018	New York City, New York (3)	0	4	4	Four people were injured in a shooting in the Bronx.
June 11, 2018	Montgomery, Alabama	0	4	4	Four people were injured in a shooting after a verbal altercation. Three suspects were arrested.
June 11, 2018	Orlando, Florida (2)	5	1	6	After barricading himself and his four children in a home for nearly 24 hours, a man shot and wounded a police officer before killing the four children and himself.
June 10, 2018	Bradenton, Florida	1	5	6	One person was killed and five others were injured after a fight in a bar moved outside and a member of one of the groups began shooting.
June 10, 2018	Valley Village, California	0	6	6	Six people were injured by gunfire at a birthday party.
June 10, 2018	Indianapolis, Indiana (2)	1	4	5	A 14-year-old boy was killed and four other people were wounded at a party. A 14-year-old boy was arrested in connection to the shooting.
June 10, 2018	Aurora, Illinois	0	7	7	Seven people were injured after gunfire broke out at a party. Several men arrived at the home and began to shoot, and an attendee at the party shot back. The police believe the incident was gang-related.
June 10, 2018	Bloomington, Illinois (1)	2	2	4	Two people were killed and two others were wounded after a shooting at a birthday party. The suspect was later taken into custody.
June 10, 2018	Chicago, Illinois (4)	1	5	6	One person was killed and five others were injured in a drive-by shooting.
June 9, 2018	Boston, Massachusetts	0	4	4	Four people were injured in a shooting at a house party.
June 9, 2018	Kannapolis, North Carolina	0	4	4	Four people were wounded after a gunman began shooting outside a high school graduation party.
June 9, 2018	Philadelphia, Pennsylvania (3)	1	4	5	Four or five gunmen killed one person and injured four others.
June 5, 2018	Jacksonville, Florida (2)	3	1	4	Three men were killed and a fourth was injured after a car pulled up alongside theirs and the occupant began shooting.
June 3, 2018	Dallas, Texas (1)	0	5	5	After an argument at a football game, a man drove a moped into the middle of the field and began to fire a gun. Multiple people then began firing at the shooter. Five people were injured in the exchange of gunshots.
June 3, 2018	Chicago, Illinois (3)	1	3	4	One person was killed and three others were wounded by two gunmen in a drive-by shooting.
June 2, 2018	Omaha, Nebraska (3)	1	6	7	One person was killed and six others were injured in a shooting. A suspect was taken into custody.
June 2, 2018	Buffalo, New York (1)	0	5	5	Five people were injured in a shooting at an outdoor gathering.
May 31, 2018	Timmonsville, South Carolina	3	2	5	A man killed a woman and two of her daughters, and injured her husband and her third daughter, when he shot them at their home. He has been arrested.
May 27, 2018	Shreveport, Louisiana (2)	0	4	4	Four people were injured in a shooting on the bank of the Red River.
May 27, 2018	Aurora, Colorado	1	3	4	A fight in a nightclub spilled into the parking lot and resulted in a shooting that killed one person and injured three others.
May 25, 2018	Cincinnati, Ohio (1)	0	4	4	A shooting broke out after a man tried to rob a group of people playing dice. Four people were injured by gunshots. Two men were arrested.
May 20, 2018	Anderson, Indiana	0	4	4	Four people were wounded in a shooting at a block party.
May 20, 2018	Hazlehurst, Mississippi	1	7	8	Two suspects fired shots into a nightclub, killing one person and wounding seven others.
May 18, 2018	Santa Fe, Texas	10	14	24	Santa Fe High School shooting: A student at Santa Fe High School shot and killed ten people and wounded fourteen others. Explosive devices were also found, but they were not detonated. The suspect was taken into custody by police.
May 16, 2018	Ponder, Texas	5	1	6	A man wounded his ex-wife and killed their three children and his ex-wife's boyfriend before killing himself in a murder–suicide.
May 14, 2018	Baltimore, Maryland (1)	0	4	4	Four men were wounded in a shooting near a playground.
May 13, 2018	Stockton, California	3	2	5	A shooter fired into a home, killing a five-year-old girl and her parents, and wounding two other family members.
May 13, 2018	Byhalia, Mississippi	0	4	4	A man opened fire at a block party, possibly after a fight over a dice game, wounding four people. The suspect was arrested.
May 13, 2018	Los Angeles, California (2)	2	2	4	A man killed one teenage boy and wounded three others. One of the wounded boys died in the hospital several days later.
May 12, 2018	Omaha, Nebraska (2)	0	7	7	Seven people were wounded in a shooting.
May 12, 2018	Paulsboro, New Jersey	0	4	4	Four people were injured by gunfire in a shooting following a fight at a birthday party.
May 11, 2018	St. Louis, Missouri (4)	0	4	4	Two children and two adults were injured when shooters fired at them from two cars.
May 11, 2018	Talihina, Oklahoma	1	4	5	Four police officers were injured in a shootout while trying to execute a search warrant, either by gunfire or from shrapnel from explosives in the home. The suspect was killed.
May 9, 2018	Omaha, Nebraska (1)	0	4	4	Four people were injured in a suspected drive-by shooting outside an apartment complex.
May 9, 2018	St. Louis, Missouri (3)	0	4	4	Four people were wounded in a shooting.
May 7, 2018	San Diego, California	0	5	5	Two men approached a group of people and wounded four people. A fifth victim was shot and wounded several blocks away. Police believe the first attack was gang-related.
May 6, 2018	Stillwater, Oklahoma	0	4	4	After a fight and theft from the bar and a tip jar, private security shut down a party. As the guests left, several weapons were fired and four people were injured.
May 6, 2018	Memphis, Tennessee (2)	2	4	6	Two people were killed and four were injured after they were shot while traveling in a car by a gunman in another car.
May 5, 2018	Columbus, Georgia	0	5	5	Five people were injured in a shooting. A suspect was arrested.
May 4, 2018	Henderson, North Carolina	0	4	4	Four people were injured in a shooting.
May 4, 2018	Chicago Heights, Illinois	0	4	4	A shooting at a house party wounded four people.
May 2, 2018	Chicago, Illinois (2)	1	4	5	A man shot at a group of people from a car, killing one and wounding four. He and the driver of the car were later arrested.
May 2, 2018	Minneapolis, Minnesota (1)	0	6	6	Six people were wounded after guns were fired following an argument at a housing complex. Three people were arrested.
May 2, 2018	New York City, New York (2)	1	4	5	One person was killed and four were wounded following a shooting outside of a Brooklyn apartment complex.
May 1, 2018	New Orleans, Louisiana (4)	0	5	5	Five people were injured in a shooting.
April 30, 2018	Pompano Beach, Florida	0	4	4	A man pulled out a gun after being punched during an after-party at a club and wounded four people.
April 30, 2018	Washington, District of Columbia (3)	0	4	4	Four people were injured in a drive-by shooting.
April 29, 2018	Wartburg, Tennessee	0	4	4	A man shot and wounded two people at an apartment complex. Two more people were wounded by gunfire while trying to disarm the shooter. The shooter was arrested.
April 29, 2018	Bryn Mawr-Skyway, Washington	2	2	4	Two people were killed and two others were injured in a shooting in a parking lot outside a motorcycle club.
April 29, 2018	Monroe, North Carolina	1	3	4	A man killed one person and wounded three others in a shooting. He was later arrested by police.
April 29, 2018	West Palm Beach, Florida	1	3	4	A man killed one person and injured three others in a shooting at a nightclub. He was later arrested by police.
April 28, 2018	Maxton, North Carolina	0	5	5	Five were injured in a shooting following an argument at a party.
April 25, 2018	Pine Bluff, Arkansas (1)	0	4	4	Four people were injured after men stepped out of a truck and began shooting at them.
April 25, 2018	St. Louis, Missouri (2)	3	1	4	Three people were killed and one was wounded after being shot in a home. A suspect was later taken into custody by police.
April 24, 2018	Flint, Michigan	0	4	4	Four people were injured in a shooting.
April 22, 2018	New Orleans, Louisiana (3)	1	5	6	After a domestic issue, a man went on a shooting spree that resulted in one death and five people being injured by gunfire. The man was arrested.
April 22, 2018	Nashville, Tennessee (2)	4	2	6	Nashville Waffle House shooting: A gunman entered a Waffle House, where he killed four people and injured two others. He was later taken into custody.
April 21, 2018	Philadelphia, Pennsylvania (2)	2	2	4	A man killed two people and wounded two others after being kicked out of a party.
April 20, 2018	San Francisco, California (2)	1	5	6	A gunman shot six men standing near each, killing one and injuring five.
April 18, 2018	Asheville, North Carolina	4	3	7	A man killed a mother and two of her children, wounded her other three children, and then killed himself.
April 15, 2018	Shreveport, Louisiana (1)	0	6	6	Six people in a tattoo parlor were injured when they were shot at by a person in a pickup truck outside the business.
April 9, 2018	Vallejo, California (1)	0	4	4	Four people were injured in a shooting outside an apartment complex.
April 8, 2018	Hickory, North Carolina	1	3	4	Several people fired hundreds of rounds outside of a bar, killing one person and injuring three others. Three men were arrested.
April 8, 2018	Miami, Florida (2)	2	2	4	Two people were killed and two were wounded in a shooting in the Liberty City neighborhood of Miami.
April 6, 2018	Jacksonville, Florida (1)	0	4	4	Four people were wounded in a shooting.
April 6, 2018	Virginia Beach, Virginia (1)	1	3	4	One person was killed and three others were injured in a shooting.
April 4, 2018	New Orleans, Louisiana (2)	2	2	4	Two people were killed and two others were injured in a shooting.
April 3, 2018	San Bruno, California	1	4 (Note: Three injured by gunfire)	5	YouTube headquarters shooting: A woman approached an outdoor patio at YouTube Headquarters and wounded three people before committing suicide, a fourth person was injured in the evacuation.
April 2, 2018	Houston, Texas (1)	1	3	4	One person was killed and three others were wounded in a drive-by shooting outside of a home.
April 1, 2018	Mobile, Alabama	1	4	5	A fifteen-year-old was killed and four other people were wounded in a shooting at a spring break party.
April 1, 2018	Saginaw, Michigan (2)	0	5	5	Five people were injured in a shooting at a house party.
March 31, 2018	Asbury Park, New Jersey	0	5	5	Five people were wounded in a drive-by shooting.
March 29, 2018	Plano, Texas	1	3	4	One person was killed and three others were injured in a shooting at an apartment complex. One person was arrested.
March 29, 2018	Camden, New Jersey	0	4	4	Four people were wounded in a shooting inside a business.
March 24, 2018	West Valley City, Utah	0	4	4	Four people were injured in a drive-by shooting directed at a traveling rap group. The shooting may have been gang-related.
March 21, 2018	San Francisco, California (1)	1	5	6	A police officer, the suspect, and four others were all wounded by gunfire. One of the wounded victims later died of his injuries.
March 17, 2018	Louisville, Kentucky	0	7	7	Seven people were injured in a shooting in a nightclub.
March 17, 2018	Harvey, Illinois	0	4	4	Four men were wounded in a shooting in a strip club, which seemed to stem from an earlier incident at a different nightclub.
March 13, 2018	Macclenny, Florida	0	4	4	Four people were injured in a drive-by shooting. Two people were later arrested.
March 12, 2018	Modesto, California (1)	0	4	4	Four people were injured when shots were fired through the garage door of the garage they were in.
March 11, 2018	Champaign, Illinois	1	3	4	Three people were wounded and one other was fatally injured in a nightclub shooting following a verbal argument.
March 11, 2018	South Bend, Indiana	0	6	6	Six people were wounded when a man began shooting at a house party. He was arrested.
March 11, 2018	Saginaw, Michigan (1)	0	5	5	Five people were injured in a shooting following an argument at a party.
March 9, 2018	Yountville, California	5 (Note: Including an unborn child)	0	5	Yountville Shooting: A man entered the Veterans Home of California and held three staff members hostage. He killed the three staff members (and the unborn child of one of the staff members, who was pregnant) before killing himself in a murder–suicide.
March 9, 2018	Wadesboro, North Carolina	3	1	4	A man killed three people and injured one other in a shooting at a restaurant and bar. He was arrested two days later.
March 7, 2018	Hurtsboro, Alabama	2	2	4	A man entered a restaurant and killed the restaurant's owner and wounded three others. He was later taken into custody by police.
March 4, 2018	Rockford, Illinois	1	4	5	One man was killed and four other people were injured in a shooting at a party.
March 3, 2018	Miami, Florida (1)	0	4	4	Four people were injured in a shooting.
March 3, 2018	New York City, New York (1)	1	3	4	One person was killed and three were injured in a shooting or series of shootings in a close vicinity in Brooklyn.
February 27, 2018	Bridgeport, Connecticut	0	4	4	Four people were wounded after being shot by at least three shooters.
February 26, 2018	Detroit, Michigan (2)	5	0	5	A man shot and killed the mother of his child and another woman who was sitting with her in a car at a gas station. He then killed another man at the gas station before returning home and killing his cousin. After being urged by his mother to turn himself in to police, the suspect killed himself.
February 23, 2018	Palm Beach Gardens, Florida (1)	1	3	4	One person was killed and three were injured after a drug deal.
February 18, 2018	San Antonio, Texas (1)	0	5	5	Five people were injured in a shooting outside a Texas Roadhouse.
February 17, 2018	Kansas City, Kansas	1	7	8	One person was killed and seven others were injured at a party in what police suspect to be a gang-related shooting.
February 17, 2018	Memphis, Tennessee (1)	0	5	5	Five people were wounded in a shooting outside a nightclub.
February 16, 2018	Oklahoma City, Oklahoma (1)	1	3	4	One person was killed and three were injured inside a home. The man who died had been receiving threats after falling out with a gang. Two people were arrested.
February 14, 2018	Parkland, Florida	17	17	34	Parkland high school shooting: A former student of Marjory Stoneman Douglas High School entered the school, killed seventeen people, and wounded eighteen others. He was taken into custody by police.
February 13, 2018	New Orleans, Louisiana (1)	3	5	8	A series of shootings left three people dead and five others wounded during the Mardi Gras celebration in New Orleans.
February 11, 2018	Detroit, Michigan (1)	4	3	7	Three women were killed and three police officers were wounded before a gunman killed himself in a murder–suicide in a home.
February 10, 2018	Paintsville, Kentucky	5	0	5	A gunman killed two people in a home and two other people in an apartment building before killing himself in a murder–suicide.
February 7, 2018	Lake Worth, Florida	3	3	6	A man killed two people and injured three others in a series of shootings before being shot and killed by a police officer.
February 5, 2018	Colorado Springs, Colorado (1)	2	4	6	A sheriff's deputy was killed and three detectives and a passerby were wounded in a shooting. The suspect was killed by police.
February 3, 2018	Cleveland, Ohio (1)	1	5	6	One person was killed and five others were injured in a shooting at a sports bar.
January 31, 2018	St. Louis, Missouri (1)	0	4	4	Three people in a car and a man standing at a bus stop were injured when they were shot at by someone in another vehicle.
January 28, 2018	Melcroft, Pennsylvania	5	0	5	A man shot his ex-girlfriend and three other people at a car wash. The suspect also sustained a gunshot injury, suspected to be self-inflicted, and later died of his injuries.
January 28, 2018	Reading, Pennsylvania	4	0	4	Four men were killed in a shooting in an apartment.
January 28, 2018	Indianapolis, Indiana (1)	2	3	5	Two were killed and three people were injured in a shooting at a bar.
January 27, 2018	Los Angeles, California (1)	0	5	5	Five people were injured in a gang-related drive-by shooting.
January 27, 2018	Bowling Green, Kentucky	0	4	4	Four people were wounded in a fight in and outside a club.
January 25, 2018	Washington, District of Columbia (2)	0	4	4	Four people were injured in a shooting.
January 23, 2018	Philadelphia, Pennsylvania (1)	0	4	4	Four people were injured in a drive-by shooting.
January 23, 2018	Benton, Kentucky	2	16	18	Marshall County High School Shooting: A fifteen-year-old student killed two other students and injured sixteen others before discarding his weapon and attempting to hide among other students. He was apprehended by police.
January 21, 2018	Orlando, Florida (1)	0	4	4	Four children were injured in a shooting. Two teenage suspects were arrested by police.
January 21, 2018	Chicago, Illinois (1)	0	4	4	Four people were injured after being shot near the entrance to a party.
January 17, 2018	Washington, District of Columbia (1)	1	3	4	A man killed one person and injured three others after determining them to be acquaintances of a person who stole his favorite pistol. The man was later taken into custody.
January 15, 2018	Alachua, Florida	0	5	5	Five people were injured in a gang-related drive-by shooting believed to be related to a murder that had happened the previous day. Two suspects were arrested.
January 14, 2018	Eutaw, Alabama	1	4	5	One person was killed and four were injured in a shooting following a fight at a biker club party.
January 14, 2018	Madison, Alabama	0	4	4	Four people were injured in a shooting at a hotel. A suspect was arrested.
January 12, 2018	Nashville, Tennessee (1)	3	2	5	A man wounded his stepmother and killed her two daughters before highjacking a car, killing the driver and wounding the passenger. A suspect was arrested after abandoning the car.
January 11, 2018	St. Robert, Missouri	2	2	4	Four people were discovered in a vehicle, two deceased and two wounded, after police responded to calls of an abandoned car.
January 7, 2018	Union Springs, Alabama	1	5	6	A shooting on US Highway 29 led to the shooting of another person at a local hospital. One person was killed and five others were wounded. Three suspects were arrested.
January 7, 2018	Plantation, Florida	0	4	4	Four people were wounded while leaving a private party.
January 5, 2018	Hattiesburg, Mississippi	0	6	6	Six people were wounded in a drive-by shooting behind a bar.
January 4, 2018	Brinkley, Arkansas	1	3	4	A 33-year-old was killed and three others wounded in a common area of an apartment complex.
January 1, 2018	Huntsville, Alabama (1)	1	3	4	A 21-year-old was killed and three others were wounded shortly after midnight at a New Year's Eve party.

== Mass shootings by death toll ==
The deadliest mass shootings and mass killings in the United States in 2018, ranked by the number of people killed (excluding the perpetrator(s), where applicable):

Date	Community	Dead	Injured	Total	Description
February 14, 2018	Parkland, Florida	17	17	34	Parkland high school shooting: A former student of Marjory Stoneman Douglas High School entered the school, killed seventeen people, and wounded eighteen others. He was taken into custody by police.
November 7, 2018	Thousand Oaks, California	13	16 (Note: 1 injured by gunfire)	29	Thousand Oaks shooting: A man entered a bar hosting a student line-dancing event and killed twelve people, including a police officer. Sixteen other people were injured, one of them by gunfire. The gunman then killed himself.
October 27, 2018	Pittsburgh, Pennsylvania (2)	11	6	17	Pittsburgh synagogue shooting: A man opened fire in the Tree of Life synagogue in an antisemitic attack, killing eleven people and injuring six others (including four police officers). The suspect was taken into custody by police.
May 18, 2018	Santa Fe, Texas	10	14	24	Santa Fe High School shooting: A student at Santa Fe High School shot and killed ten people and wounded fourteen others. Explosive devices were also found, but they were not detonated. The suspect was taken into custody by police.
June 28, 2018	Annapolis, Maryland	5	2	7	Capital Gazette shooting: A gunman entered the offices of The Capital Gazette and killed five employees and wounded two others.
September 12, 2018	Bakersfield, California	6	0	6	A gunman opened fire at three locations after following a witness to another store and then to a private home. He killed two women and three men before carjacking a woman and child, and committing suicide when police approached.

== Monthly Statistics ==
Month	Mass Shootings	Killed	Injured	Occurring at School
January	21	23	89	1
February	14	43	64	1
March	18	15	68	0
April	25	27	87	0
May	29	34	123	1
June	52	47	218	0
July	46	42	184	0
August	35	20	154	0
September	10	25	34	0
October	31	40	117	0
November	27	59	84	0
December	15	13	56	0
Total	323	388	1,278	3

== See also ==
- List of school shootings in the United States (before 2000)
- List of school shootings in the United States (2000–present)
- List of school shootings in the United States by death toll
