= Creasy =

Creasy is a surname. Notable people with the surname include:

- Edward Shepherd Creasy (1812–1878), English historian
- George Creasy (1895–1972), Royal Navy officer
- Gerald Creasy (1897–1983), British colonial administrator
- Kenneth Creasy (1932–1992), American politician
- Robert Creasy (1939–2005), American computer scientist
- Rosalind Creasy (born 1939), American landscape designer and author
- Sara Creasy (born 1968), Australian author
- Stella Creasy (born 1977), British Labour Co-operative politician

== Fictional characters ==
- Marcus Creasy in the Man on Fire novel and sequels
- Christian Creasy in the 1987 Man on Fire film
- John Creasy in the 2004 Man on Fire film

== See also ==
- Creasey (surname)
- Creasy Airport, in unincorporated Galveston County, Texas, United States
