= Algoa, Texas =

- Unincorporated community
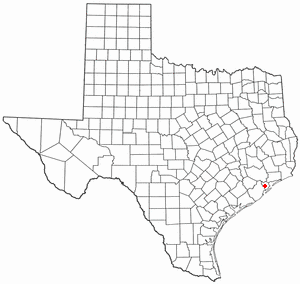
- Location of Algoa, Texas
- Coordinates: 29°24′09″N 95°10′10″W
- Country: United States
- State: Texas
- County: Galveston
- Settled: 1880
- Elevation: 33 ft (10 m)

Population (2000)
  - Total: 125
- Time zone: UTC-6 (Central (CST))
  - Summer (DST): UTC-5 (CDT)
- ZIP code: 77511
- Area codes: 281, 409
- GNIS feature ID: 1329358

Algoa is an unincorporated community in Galveston County, Texas, United States. The population was 125 according to the 2000 census. The 2010 census did not record the population of Algoa.

== History ==
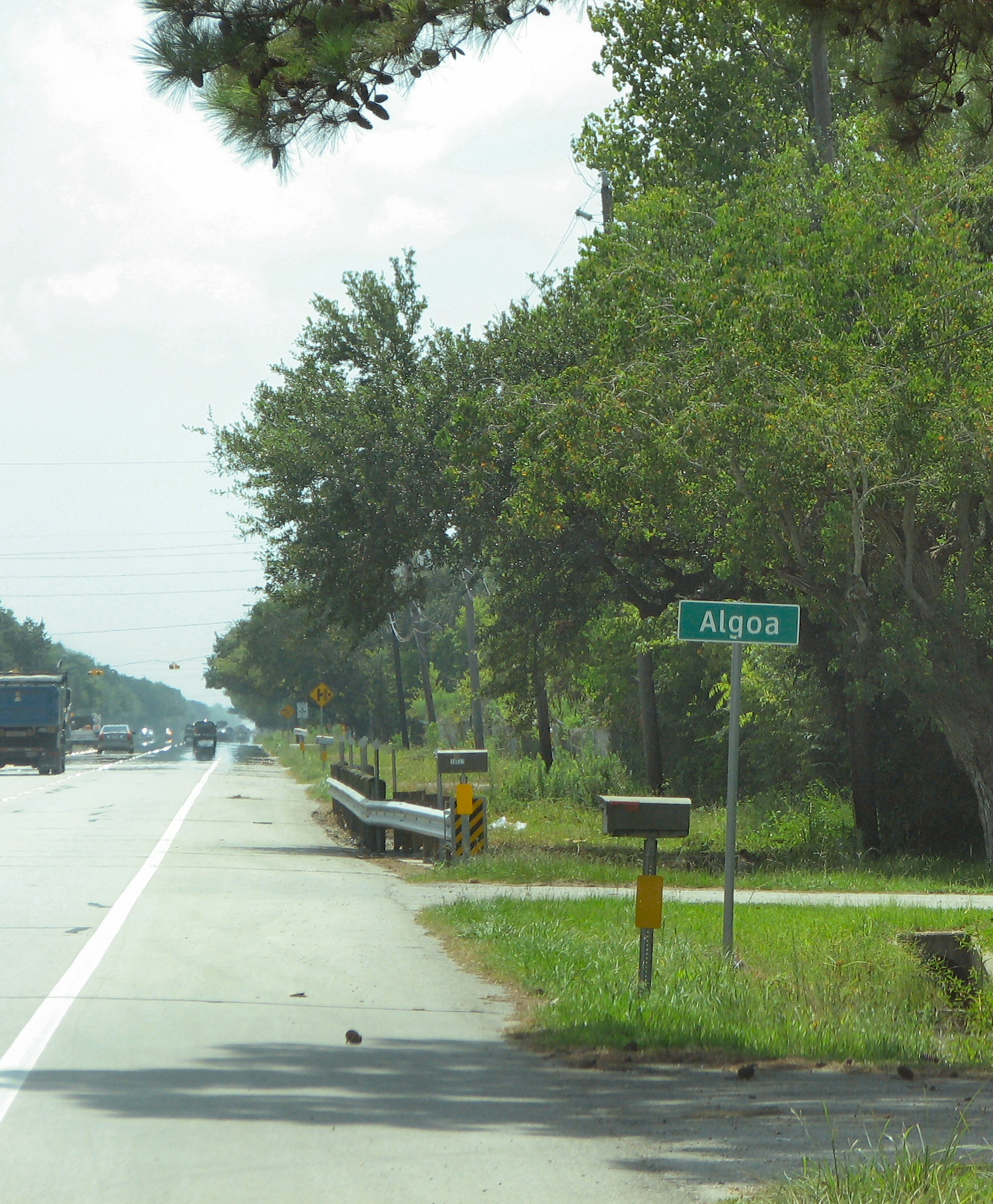
Algoa townsite marker

The town was founded in 1880 on the Gulf, Colorado and Santa Fe Railway and originally named Hughes. In 1893 telephone service was installed in the area, and in 1897 a post office was opened under the name Algoa.

Primarily an agricultural community, early crops consisted of mainly pears, satsumas, strawberries, and figs that were then sold in nearby Galveston. Later, in the early 1900s, many farmers switched over to rice and dairy farming.

== Education ==
Algoa students are zoned to schools in the Santa Fe Independent School District.

== Postal services ==
The Algoa post office closed in 1972. Mail service is handled by the nearby Alvin and Santa Fe post offices. Algoa uses Alvin, Texas zip code, 77511.
