= Arcadia, Santa Fe, Texas =

Unincorporated area in Galveston County, Texas, U.S.

Coordinates: 29°23′00″N 95°07′13″W

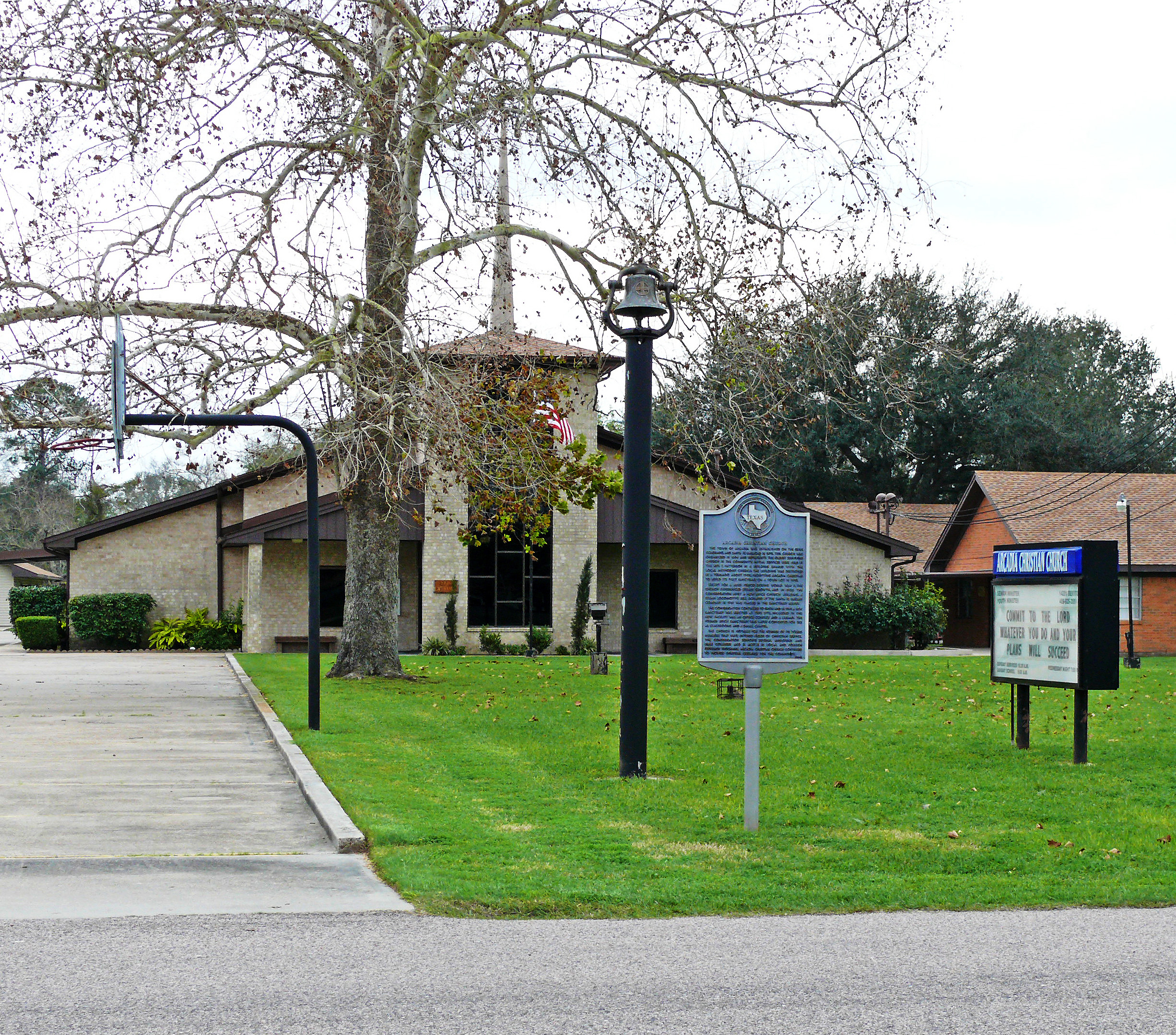
Arcadia Christian Church

Arcadia was an unincorporated area in Galveston County, Texas, United States, which is now a neighborhood of the city of Santa Fe. It sits at an elevation of 30 feet (9 m).

== History ==
Arcadia was established around 1889 near Hall's Bayou on the Gulf, Colorado and Santa Fe Railway. It was named after Arcadia, Louisiana. Henry Runge plated the town in 1890 as Hall's Station on Stephen F. Austin's fourth land grant. The Coaque people were native to the area, which was later explored by Álvar Núñez Cabeza de Vaca. The town became a part of Santa Fe, Texas, in the 1980s.
