= Creasey =

Creasey is a surname. Notable people with the surname include:

- Henry Creasey (1864–1923), British sport shooter
- Joel Creasey (born 1990), Australian actor and comedian
- John Creasey (1908–1973), English crime and science fiction writer
- Ray Creasey (1921–1976), British aerodynamicist
- Timothy Creasey (1923–1986), British Army officer

== See also ==
- Creasy, surname
- Creasey v Breachwood Motors Ltd, UK company law case concerning piercing the corporate veil
