= Alta Loma, Texas =

Unincorporated area annexed into Santa Fe in 1978

Coordinates: 29.370657°N 95.078562°W

Alta Loma, Texas (Spanish: alta—high, loma—ground), located in southwestern Galveston County, was an unincorporated area which became a part of the city of Santa Fe in 1978.

== Notable people ==
- Johnny Lee - country singer, known for the hit song Lookin' for Love from the Urban Cowboy (1980) soundtrack
