= 2018 Santa Fe High School shooting =

Mass shooting in Texas, U.S.

- Location: 29°23′31″N 95°08′28″W; Santa Fe High School; 16000 Hwy 6 Santa Fe, Texas, U.S.
- Date: May 18, 2018; 8 years ago 7:32 – 8:02 a.m. (CDT, UTC−6)
- Target: Students and staff at Santa Fe High School
- Attack type: School shooting; mass shooting; shootout; mass murder
- Weapons: 12-gauge Remington 870 shotgun; Rossi .38-caliber snub-nosed revolver; Explosives (unused); Molotov cocktail (unused)
- Deaths: 10
- Injuries: 13
- Motive: Unknown
- Accused: Dimitrios Pagourtzis (found incompetent to stand trial; found liable in civil court)
- Charges: 11 federal charges (Note: Pagourtzis's federal charges are not publicly known, as he was a minor at the time of the crimes.); Capital murder of multiple people; Aggravated assault against a public servant
- Litigation: Lawsuit against weapons manufacturer by parents of victims settled out-of-court; Civil jury found parents of Dimitrios Pagourtzis not liable, Pagourtzis and weapons manufacturer liable (Note: In lawsuit by families of Chris Stone and Aaron McLeod.)

On May 18, 2018, a school shooting occurred at Santa Fe High School in Santa Fe, Texas, United States, in the Houston metropolitan area. Eight students and two teachers were killed, and thirteen others were wounded. Dimitrios Pagourtzis, a 17-year-old student, was taken into custody.

Pagourtzis was charged with murder and assault, and with eleven federal crimes that cannot be disclosed as he was a minor at the time of the shooting. He was declared incompetent to stand trial shortly after being charged, and as of March 2026 is still considered incompetent.

Pagourtzis, his parents, and the manufacturer of the weapons that were used in the shooting were named in a civil lawsuit by some of the victims' families. A jury found Pagourtzis and the weapons manufacturer responsible for the killings, but his parents not responsible.

== Background ==
The Santa Fe Independent School District has an active shooter plan, and two armed police officers that interacted with students in the school. In the year prior to the shooting, the school district leadership made plans to arm teachers and staff through the Texas School Marshal Program.

The shooting occurred three months after the Parkland high school shooting. One month before the shooting, students at Santa Fe High School participated in the March for Our Lives protests.

== Preparation ==
On March 2, 2018, Dimitrios Pagourtzis logged on to LuckyGunner.com and purchased 50 rounds of .38 Special ammunition and 105 rounds of 12-gauge shotgun ammunition. Two weeks later, on March 13, 2018, Pagourtzis ordered an additional 35 rounds of 12-gauge shotgun ammunition. In both cases, Pagourtzis was not required to provide any proof of age, he paid using an American Express gift card, used his real name and address for shipment, and declined the adult signature requirement, with both his orders being automatically approved, and shipped through FedEx.

== Shooting ==
Video of the shooting location on May 18, 2018. Video from Voice of America (1:06)

The gunman began firing a weapon into an art class at the school at 7:32 a.m. CDT. The incident occurred in the school's art complex, which consists of four interconnected rooms with interior hallways, and four other rooms. Witnesses said the two targeted classrooms are connected by a ceramics room that the shooter accessed by damaging a door window. During the shooting a staff member pulled a fire alarm, causing most of the school to evacuate.

One wounded victim told reporters the shooter walked into the classroom and pointed his firearm at another person, singing "Another One Bites the Dust" in between shots. According to a witness, students barricaded themselves in the art classroom storage closet, but the shooter shot through the door with a shotgun. He left the art room briefly, causing students to leave the closet and attempt to barricade the art room door, but he pushed the door open. Upon spotting a student he knew, he said "Surprise!" and shot the student in the chest. Students are credited with giving victims first aid.

Santa Fe ISD Police officers stationed at the school exchanged fire with the shooter, with one officer being wounded and admitted in critical condition to a local hospital. After the gunman shot into the ceramics room, he was engaged by another school officer and a Texas Highway Patrol trooper who attempted to have him surrender peacefully. He reportedly threatened to shoot the officers and repeatedly fired rounds while arguing with the police. He surrendered to the officers after being injured. The Galveston County Sheriff said officers confronted him within four minutes and allowed for the safe evacuation of other students and faculty.

Parents were kept off school grounds during the response to the shooting, with parents being directed to the Alamo gym by 8 AM. Students were then evacuated to the gym and reunited with their parents.

== Victims ==
Ten people were killed and thirteen people were injured. The eight students and two teachers killed were:

- Cynthia Tisdale, 63 (teacher)
- Glenda Ann Perkins, 64 (teacher)
- Jared Conard Black, 17
- Shana Fisher, 16
- Christian Riley Garcia, 15
- Aaron Kyle McLeod, 15
- Angelique Ramirez, 15
- Sabika Sheikh, 17 (an exchange student from Pakistan)
- Christopher Stone, 17
- Kimberly Vaughan, 14

== Investigation ==
The shooter told police he meant to kill the classmates he shot and wanted to spare the students he liked, so he could "have his story told". The shooting lasted about 25 minutes until he was arrested.

According to the probable cause affidavit and complaint filed by law enforcement, the shooter used a short-barreled 12-gauge Remington Model 870 pump-action shotgun and a Rossi .38-caliber snub-nosed revolver. Both firearms appear to have been legally owned by his father. Various types of explosive devices were found at the school and off campus, as well as a Molotov cocktail, and residents in the surrounding area were warned to be aware of all suspicious objects.

Two other people were detained by police as persons of interest. One was detained at the scene due to "suspicious reactions" after the shooting, and another was described as being interviewed.

== Suspect ==
The suspected shooter was identified by police as Dimitrios Pagourtzis (born October 12, 2000), a 17-year-old junior at the school. He is charged with capital murder of multiple people and aggravated assault against a public servant, and has been held in custody without bail. If convicted, he faces a maximum sentence of 40 years to life. His father came to the United States in his mid-twenties from Magoulista, Karditsa, Greece. He ran a business in the Santa Fe area selling agricultural machinery.

According to at least one witness, Pagourtzis was bullied by multiple students and coaches. The school denied the allegations of bullying by coaches. One of his former teachers described him as "quiet, but he wasn't quiet in a creepy way", and said that he had never seen him draw or write anything in his class journal that she found suspicious or unusual. Pagourtzis was on the honor roll, and he played on the school football team.

Pagourtzis's journals on his computer and cell phone, found by police after the shooting, suggested to Governor Greg Abbott "not only did he want to commit the shooting, but he wanted to commit suicide after the shooting, planned on doing this for some time. He advertised his intentions but somehow slipped through the cracks." Classmates recounted how at a water park the day before the shooting Pagourtzis did not show any signs of his plans, and seemed friendly and funny.

The New York Times and Los Angeles Times highlighted Pagourtzis's social media presence. On April 30, Pagourtzis posted a photo of a shirt with the words "Born to Kill" on his Facebook page. The Facebook page also included photos of his black duster coat with several buttons on it, with an accompanying caption: "Hammer and Sickle=Rebellion. Rising Sun=Kamikaze Tactics. Iron Cross=Bravery. Baphomet=Evil. Cthulu=Power." The Facebook page has since been taken down.

According to Pagourtzis’ parents, they were unaware of their son's spiraling mental health. On the days leading up to the shooting, Pagourtzis's hygiene was deteriorating, and he began failing classes, and started skipping school. The mother Rose Marie Kosmetatos, reportedly expressed concern for her son's abnormal behavior in a 2017 email.

== Legal proceedings ==
Pagourtzis was booked into the Galveston County Jail on two felony charges — capital murder of multiple people and aggravated assault against a police officer. He was ordered held without bail. Pagourtzis was represented by attorneys hired by his parents. Due to his age at the time of the shooting, Pagourtzis was ineligible for the death penalty or life without parole. If convicted of capital murder, he would face a life sentence with parole eligibility after 40 years. Aggravated assault on a public servant carries a 5-99 year or 30 years to life sentence.

The defense team for Pagourtzis filed a change of venue request to move the trial out of Galveston County due to the publicity of the case. On February 27, 2019, a judge granted the request without specifying the new venue. In April 2019, it was announced that Pagourtzis would be facing 11 federal charges, despite a previous statement that federal charges would not be pursued. In June 2019, it was announced that the state trial would take place in Richmond in January 2020.

However, on November 4, 2019, Pagourtzis was found by three experts to be unfit to stand trial. He has been in custody at North Texas State Hospital since that month; on March 11, 2020, after hospital experts submitted a report declaring that he was not competent, nor likely to become so in the next 90 days, Judge John Ellisor signed an order requiring him to remain in mental health treatment for at least 12 months.

On February 11, 2022, Pagourtzis was again found incompetent to stand trial and was ordered to stay in the mental hospital for another 12 months. Since then, Pagourtzis has been found not competent to stand trial and recommitted on February 1, 2023, January 26, 2024, January 24, 2025, and January 14, 2026.

=== Separate filings ===
The parents of victim Chris Stone filed a lawsuit against Pagourtzis's parents, claiming that his father did not properly secure his son's weapons and that the parents were negligent in entrusting their son with the firearms. Under Texas law, firearms cannot be made accessible to minors outside hunting purposes or parental supervision, and the penalty can be up to a year in jail and a $4,000 fine if the weapon causes serious injury or death. The parents of a second victim, Aaron McLeod, joined the lawsuit with additional allegations. Both families are also alleging that Pagourtzis's parents failed to obtain mental health counseling and support and to warn the public of his "dangerous propensities". The trial was set for July 2024.

On August 19, 2024, the civil jury found Pagourtzis's parents not liable for the deaths, while they found Pagourtzis and the company that sold him ammunition, Lucky Gunner, liable. The families will not see further compensation from either of the two liable parties, since Pagourtzis is incompetent to stand trial and the families settled with the manufacturer out-of-court.

== Aftermath ==
Students organized a candlelight vigil on May 18. Ten white crosses were placed in front of the school to memorialize the deceased. The white crosses were removed prior to the start of the 2018–19 school year, and families of the victims were permitted to take home anything that was left for their family member at the makeshift memorial. President Trump ordered all U.S. flags flown at half-staff from May 18 until sunset on May 22. Blood drives were set up to support the local hospitals. Houston Texans football player J. J. Watt offered to pay the funeral expenses of all the deceased. Local funeral homes, florists, and pastors offered heavily discounted or free rates for families of the deceased.

On May 26, 2018, multiple fundraisers were held. One local business sponsored a fundraiser that brought in $257,000 for the victims. In 2019, the Santa Fe 10 Memorial Foundation was organized to raise funds for a permanent memorial; as of May 2022 it had a $1.6 million goal. In 2019, partly in response to the Santa Fe High School shooting, the Texas Legislature allocated nearly $100 million to establish the Texas Child Mental Health Care Consortium.

The following Monday of the shooting, there were five arrests in the Greater Houston area for bringing weapons to school or making threats in the Friendswood, Huffman, Cleveland, Clear Creek, and Texas City Independent School Districts.

In July 2019 it emerged that David Briscoe, who had told reporters that he was a substitute at the school the day of the shooting, had lied about his actions. After the shooting, many sources including Time, CNN, and The Wall Street Journal ran stories about how Briscoe protected his students until first responders came. In April 2019, he did a follow-up interview with The Texas Tribune in which his claims included him moving to Florida, as he was haunted by the shooting. Upon further investigation by the reporter, it was discovered that Briscoe had never worked for the Santa Fe Independent School District, and upon the discovery that he had lied, Briscoe had since deleted several Twitter posts about his survival and the media outlets who published his account have removed them.

== Reactions ==
Statements from Walter Braun, the Santa Fe Independent School District police chief (0:58)

The residents of Santa Fe largely declined media attention and also did not support political gun control actions. After the shooting, the president of the school district's Board of Trustees said the district's policies and procedures worked, and that it was not the failure of the procedures that accounted for the incident, adding someone intent on entering the school to create havoc would be able to do so in any event.As a result of the shooting, the district planned to renovate the northwest area of the campus, including sealing off the art rooms in which the shooting occurred, as well as the adjacent hallway. A new hallway and counselor's office was to be installed. A new protection plan was unveiled for the 2018–2019 school year, with metal detectors at each entrance and police officers patrolling the campus with donated AR-15s equipped with rifle optics.

The organizers of March for Our Lives tweeted "Though this is the 22nd school shooting this year, we urge those reading this not to sweep it under the rug and forget."

=== Pagourtzis's family ===
In a published statement, Pagourtzis's family extended their prayers and condolences to the victims and thanked first responders for their assistance. According to the statement, they were as shocked by the event as everyone else. The family stated they were cooperating with authorities and requested the media and others to respect their privacy and that of the victims. While speaking to reporters, Pagourtzis's father, an immigrant from Greece, claimed that his son's history of being bullied was the reason for the shooting.

=== Political ===
U.S. President Donald Trump expressed his condolences in a press conference shortly following the shootings, and said his "administration is determined to do everything in [its] power to protect our students". On May 31, Trump met with victims, families, and others affected, to discuss the event and try to find prevention methods.

Secretary of Education Betsy DeVos said, "Our schools must be safe and nurturing environments for learning. No student should have to experience the trauma suffered by so many today and in similar events prior. We simply cannot allow this trend to continue."

Texas Governor Greg Abbott said in a press briefing that the attack was "one of the most heinous attacks that we've ever seen in the history of Texas schools." He also said that the shooter wanted to commit suicide later in the incident and called for all Texans to hold a moment of silence on May 21 at 10:00 AM CDT in honor of the victims, their families and first responders. Texas Lieutenant Governor Dan Patrick said the design of Texas schools with "too many entrances and too many exits" may have to be reconsidered. He said the issue is "not about the guns, it's about us."

== See also ==
- List of school shootings in the United States
- List of school shootings in the United States by death toll
