= Creasy Airport =

- IATA: none; ICAO: none; FAA LID: 5TA5

Summary
- Airport type: Private
- Serves: Santa Fe
- Location: Texas, United States
- Coordinates: 29°20′10″N 95°06′55″W
- Interactive map of Creasy Airport

Creasy Airport (FAA LID: 5TA5) is an airport located in unincorporated Galveston County, Texas, United States. The airport is located southwest of Santa Fe and west of Hitchcock.

The airport is privately owned by William K. Creasy. The airport is for private use.
