= Santa Fe, Texas =

Santa Fe
- City
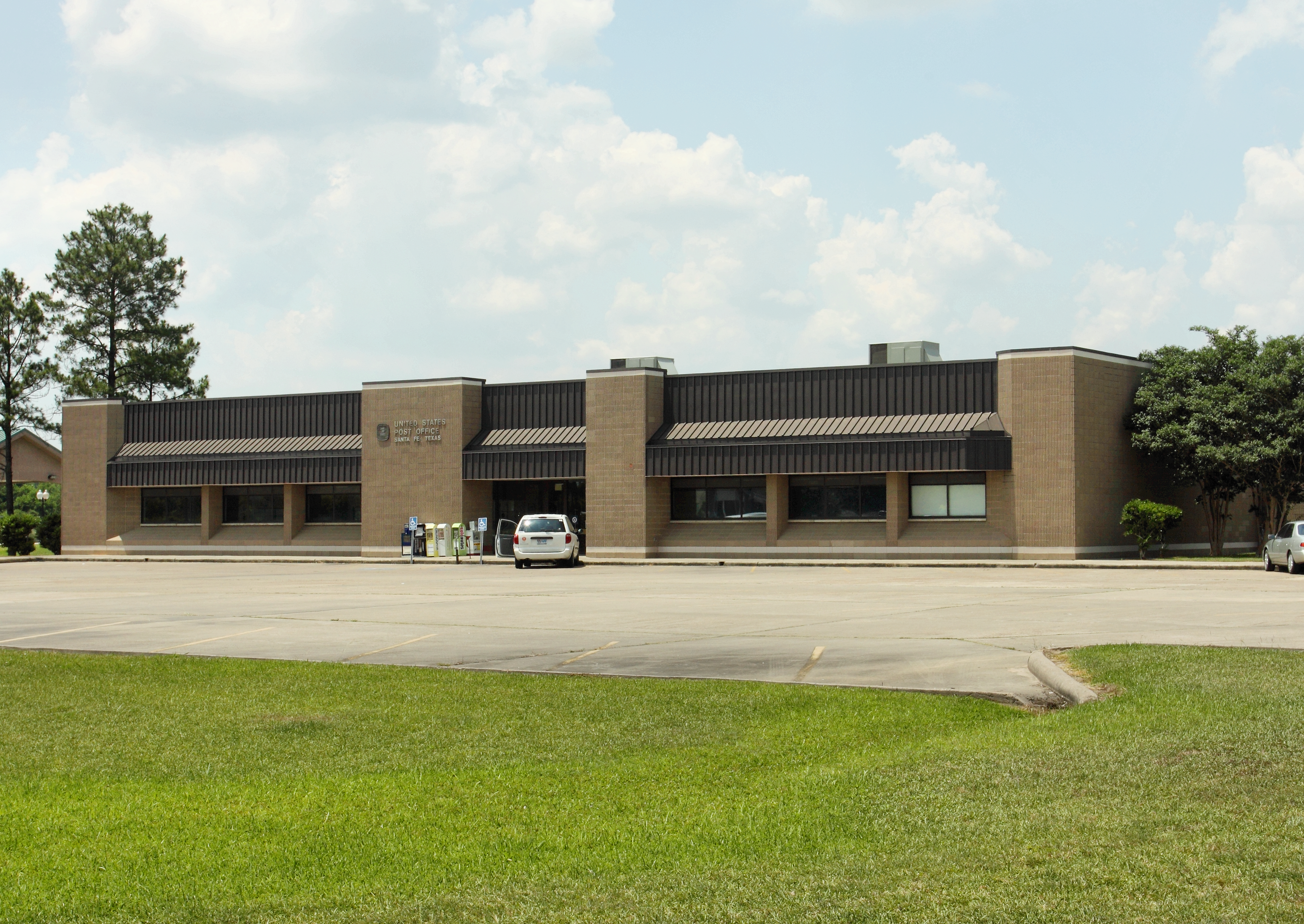
- Santa Fe, Texas, Post Office

- Location of Santa Fe, Texas

- Location of Santa Fe, Texas Santa Fe (the United States)
- Coordinates: 29°22′50″N 95°6′15″W
- Country: United States
- State: Texas
- County: Galveston

Area
  - Total: 17.09 sq mi (44.25 km^{2})
  - Land: 16.90 sq mi (43.76 km^{2})
  - Water: 0.19 sq mi (0.49 km^{2})
- Elevation: 30 ft (9 m)

Population (2020)
  - Total: 12,735
  - Density: 753.7/sq mi (291.0/km^{2})
- Time zone: UTC-6 (Central (CST))
  - Summer (DST): UTC-5 (CDT)
- ZIP Codes: 77510, 77517
- Area code: 409
- FIPS code: 48-65726
- GNIS feature ID: 1351043
- Website: www.santafetx.gov

Santa Fe is a city in Galveston County, Texas, United States. It is named for the Santa Fe Railroad (now part of BNSF Railway), which runs through the town alongside State Highway 6. The population of Santa Fe at the 2020 census was 12,735.

== History ==
In 1877, the Gulf, Colorado and Santa Fe Railway was built through the western part of Galveston county. By the turn of the century, three small, unincorporated towns had formed along the railway: Alta Loma, Arcadia, and Algoa. The Santa Fe Independent School District, which was named after the railway, was established shortly afterward to serve the area.

In the mid-1970s, the neighboring city of Hitchcock attempted to annex an area in eastern Alta Loma known as the Morningview neighborhood. Amid intense opposition to becoming part of Hitchcock, residents began a petitioning effort to incorporate the area into a new city. On January 21, 1978, a ballot proposal to incorporate Alta Loma and parts of Arcadia passed by a wide margin and the city of Santa Fe was established. Santa Fe has since grown to include all of Arcadia and parts of Algoa, and ironically is now twice the size of Hitchcock.

On February 14, 1981, the Ku Klux Klan hosted a fish fry on a private farm in Santa Fe to protest the growing presence of Vietnamese shrimpers in the Gulf. During the event, a Vietnamese fishing boat was ceremonially burned. The controversy and similar conflicts in nearby port towns such as Rockport, led to a decision of the United States District Court, S.D. Texas, Houston Division Vietnamese Fishermen's Association v. Knights of the Ku Klux Klan, and also was the basis of the story for the 1985 Ed Harris film Alamo Bay.

On June 19, 2000, the Supreme Court ruled that the Santa Fe Independent School District's policy of permitting "student-led, student-initiated" prayer at football games and other school events violated the Constitution's prohibitions against the establishment of state religion.

On the morning of May 18, 2018, a school shooting occurred at Santa Fe High School when 17-year-old student Dimitrios Pagourtzis opened fire in an art classroom, killing 10 students including Sabika Sheikh, 17 (an exchange student from Pakistan) and faculty and injuring 13 others. Students and faculty evacuated the building when a fire alarm was activated. Pagourtzis surrendered after being injured in an exchange of gunfire with school officers. Originally scheduled to stand trial in January 2020 for 10 counts of capital murder, Pagourtzis has been in custody at a state mental hospital since being found unfit to stand trial in November 2019.

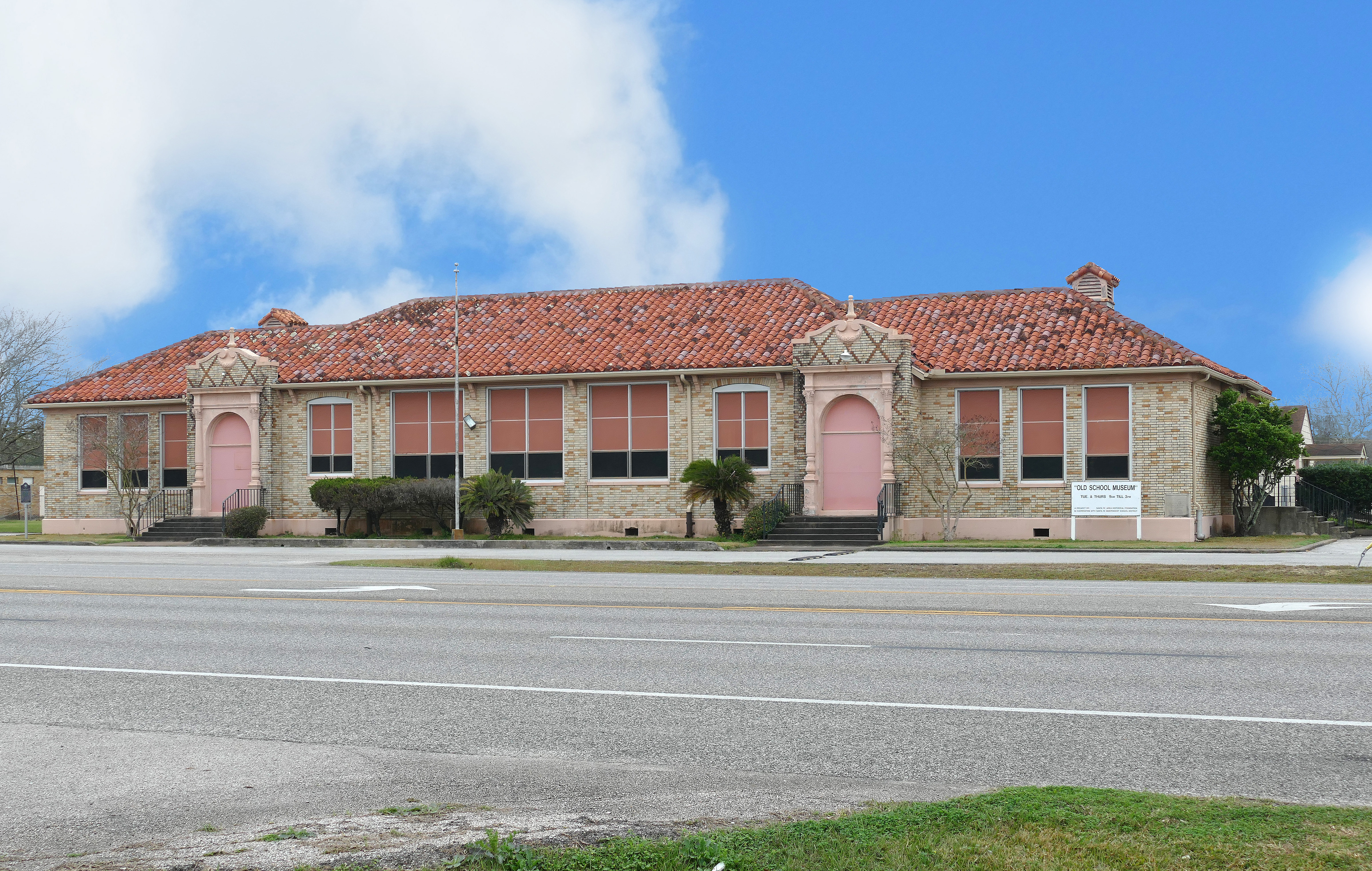
Old High School Now on the National Register of Historical Places

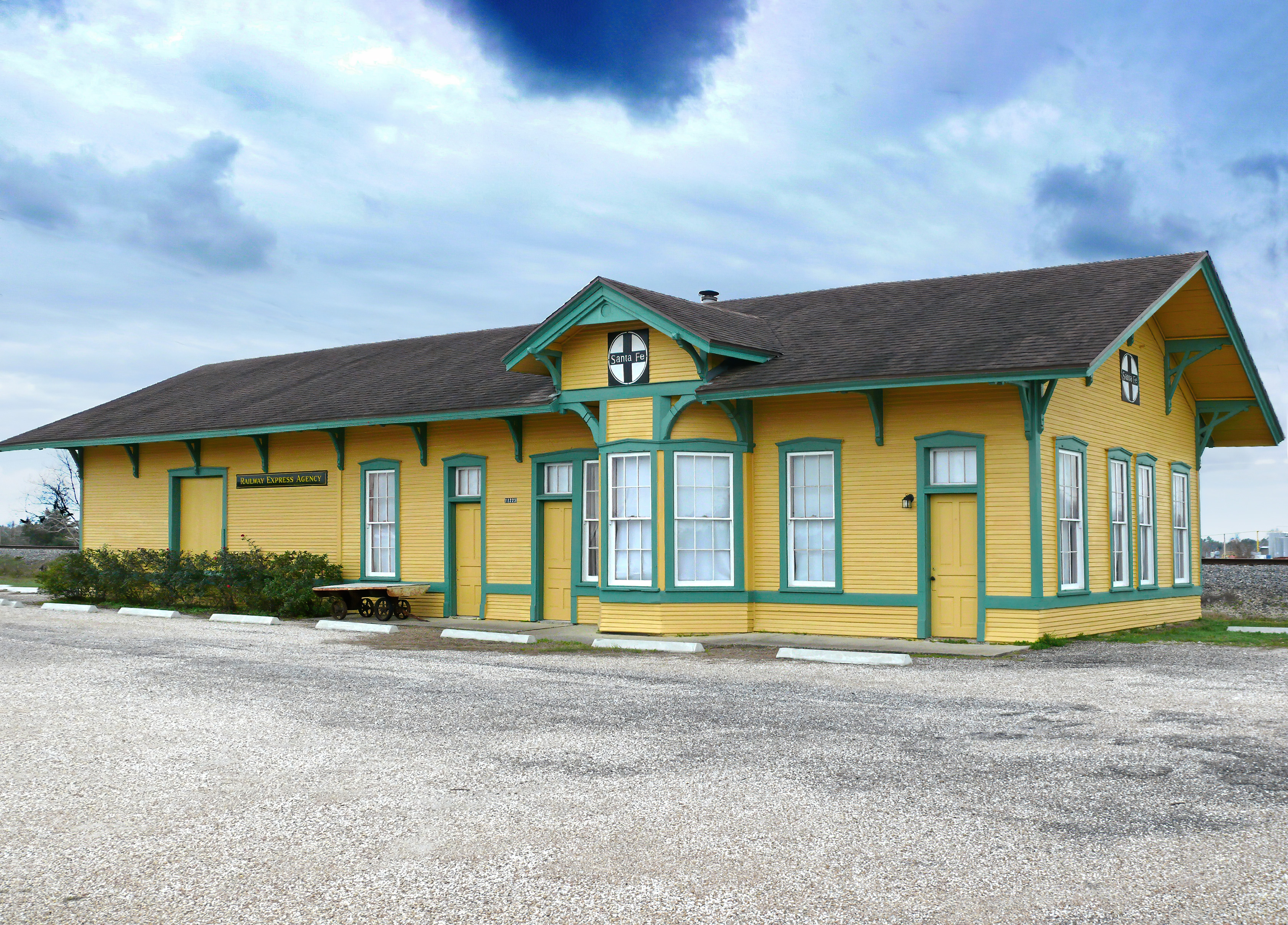
Hitchcock Depot–Santa Fe (Alta Loma)–a recorded Texas landmark

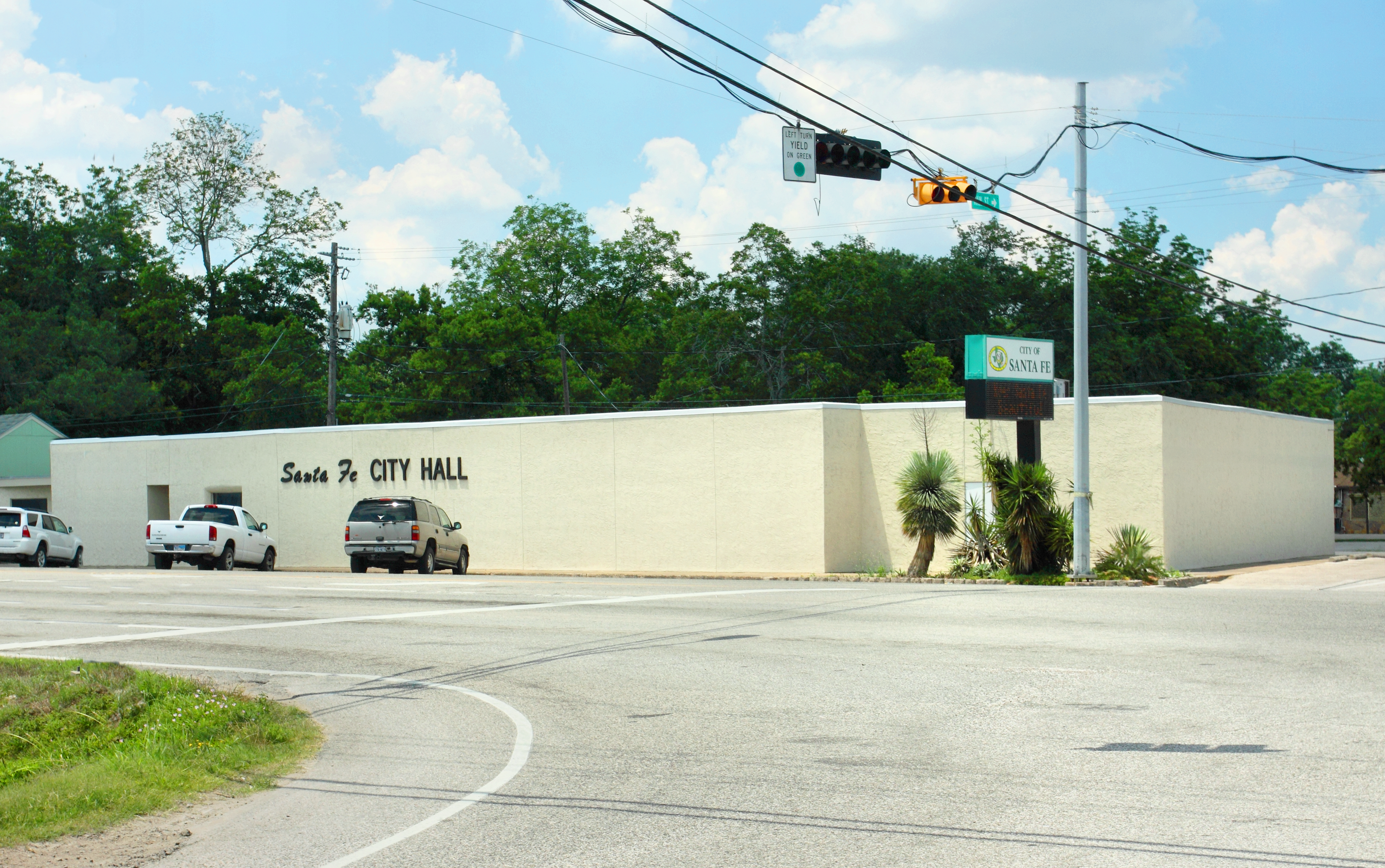
Santa Fe City Hall

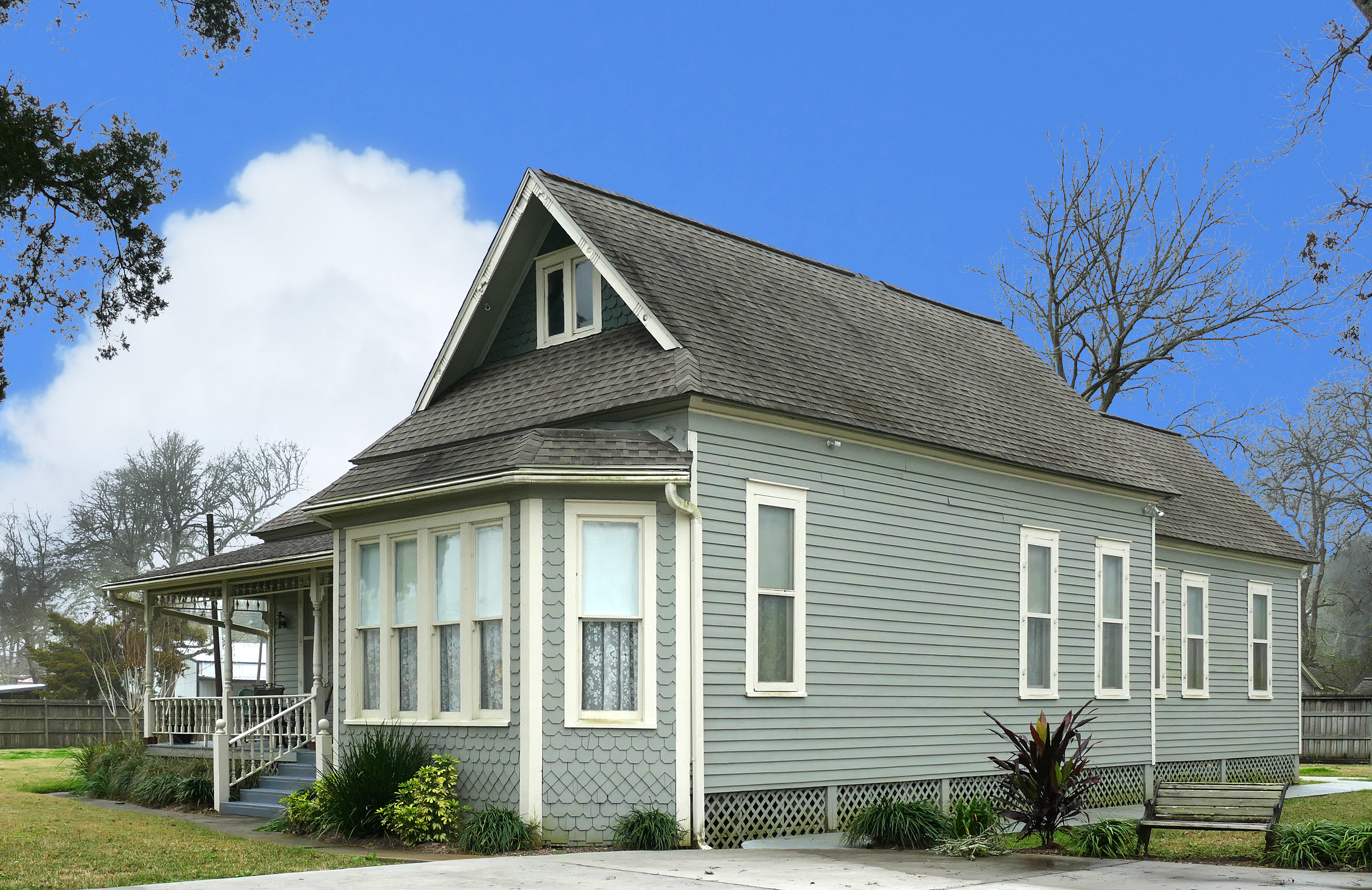
Miller-Brautigam Home–a Recorded Texas Landmark

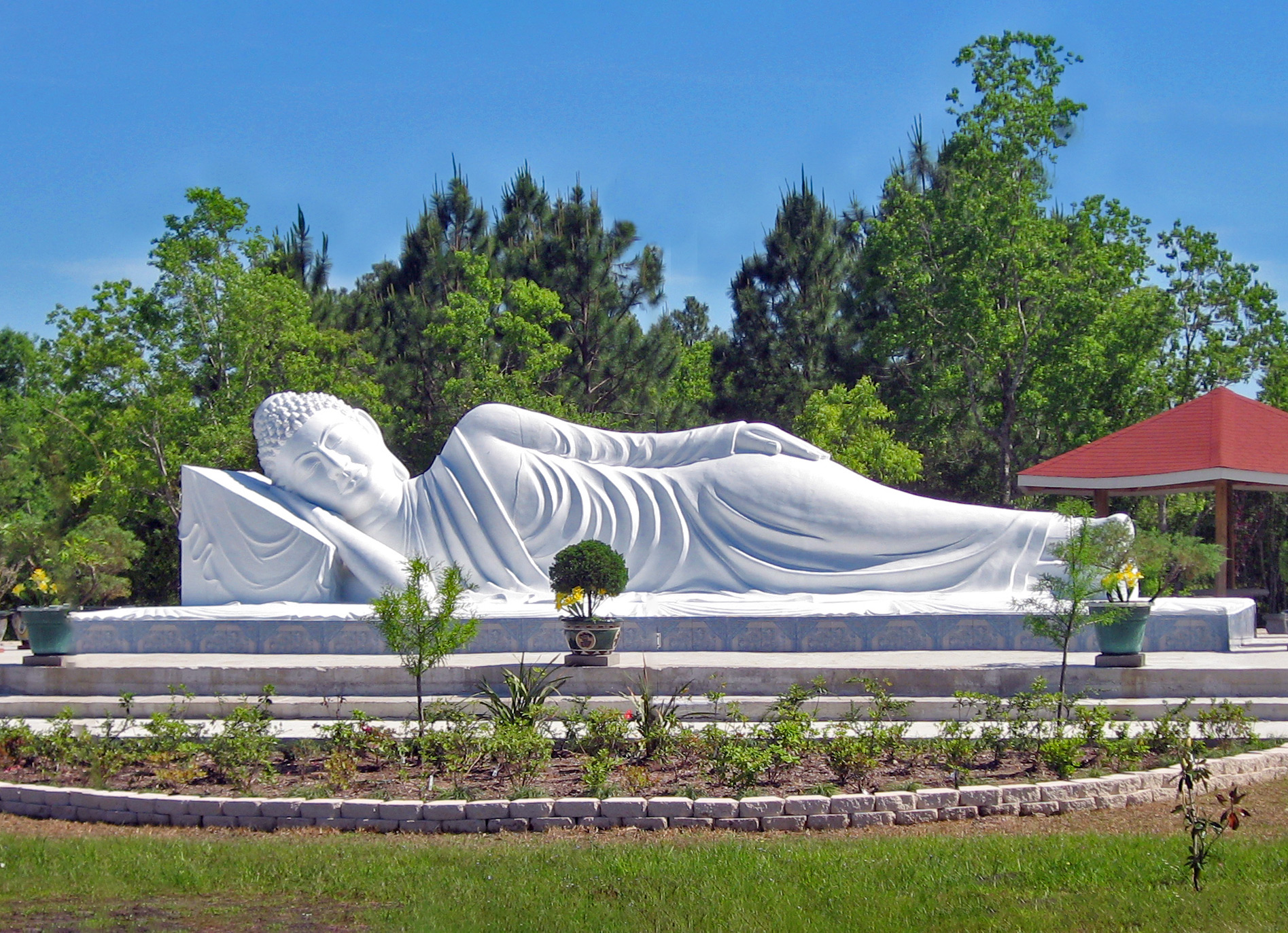
Reclining Buddha at Linh Son Buddhist Temple, Santa Fe, Texas

== Geography and climate ==
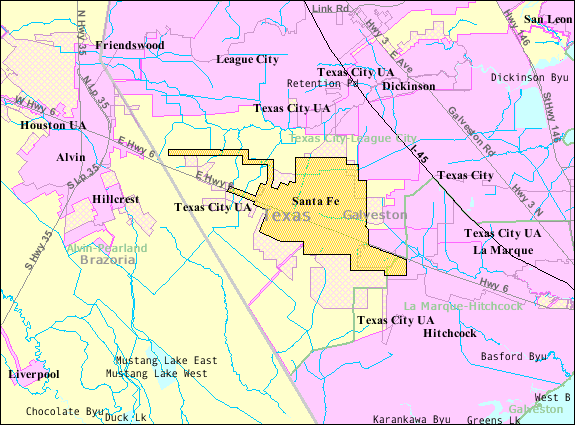
Map of Santa Fe

Santa Fe is located at 29°22′50″N 95°6′15″W (29.380651, –95.104163) on a low coastal plain that averages between 19 and 27 ft (5.8 and 8.2 m) above sea level. The primary waterways are Highland Bayou and Halls Bayou, which both flow southeastward and empty into West Bay. Being prone to flash flooding, the area is lined with numerous drainage ditches, culverts, diversionary canals, and reservoirs.

According to the United States Census Bureau, the city has a total area of 17.3 square miles (44.9 km^{2}), of which 0.19 sq mi (0.5 km^{2}), or 1.10%, is covered by water.

It is 35 mi (56 km) south of downtown Houston and 20 mi (32 km) northwest of Galveston. In 2019, Skip Hollandworth of Texas Monthly wrote that Santa Fe "still feels very much like a small town" despite that distance.

Santa Fe has a climate of hot, humid summers and cool, mild winters. Average annual temperature is 68.6°F with 56.5 in of annual rainfall. Santa Fe averages 71.7 days above 90°F. In the Köppen climate classification, Santa Fe has a humid subtropical climate, Cfa.

== Demographics ==
=== 2020 census ===
As of the 2020 census, 12,735 people, 4,903 households, and 3,449 families were residing in the city. The median age was 41.8 years. 22.6% of residents were under the age of 18 and 18.3% of residents were 65 years of age or older. For every 100 females there were 94.6 males, and for every 100 females age 18 and over there were 92.8 males age 18 and over.

94.7% of residents lived in urban areas, while 5.3% lived in rural areas.

There were 4,903 households in Santa Fe, of which 32.5% had children under the age of 18 living in them. Of all households, 54.0% were married-couple households, 15.8% were households with a male householder and no spouse or partner present, and 23.8% were households with a female householder and no spouse or partner present. About 22.0% of all households were made up of individuals and 11.2% had someone living alone who was 65 years of age or older.

There were 5,267 housing units, of which 6.9% were vacant. The homeowner vacancy rate was 1.8% and the rental vacancy rate was 8.2%.

Racial composition as of the 2020 census
Race	Number	Percent
White	10,659	83.7%
Black or African American	48	0.4%
American Indian and Alaska Native	85	0.7%
Asian	54	0.4%
Native Hawaiian and Other Pacific Islander	9	0.1%
Some other race	644	5.1%
Two or more races	1,236	9.7%
Hispanic or Latino (of any race)	2,172	17.1%

=== 2010 census ===
Historical population
Census	Pop.	Note	%±
1980	6,172		—
1990	8,429		36.6%
2000	9,548		13.3%
2010	12,222		28.0%
2020	12,735		4.2%
U.S. Decennial Census

As of the census of 2010, 12,222 people and 4,564 households were residing in the city. The population density was 682.5 inhabitants per square mile (263.5/km^{2}). The 4,957 housing units had an average density of 289.2 per square mile (111.7/km^{2}). The racial makeup of the city was 93.8% White, 0.4% African American, 0.5% Native American, 0.5% Asian, 0.1% Pacific Islander, 3.3% from other races, and 1.5% from two or more races. Hispanics or Latinos of any race were 11.6% of the population.

Of the 4,583 households, 36.8% had children under 18 living with them, 57.7% were married couples, 12.2% had a female householder with no husband present, and 23.7% were not families. Among all households, 27.0% were made up of individuals, and 19.3% had someone living alone who was 65 or older. The average household size was 2.67 and the average family size was 3.03.

In the city, the age distribution was 27.2% under 18, 5.2% from 18 to 24, 23.9% from 25 to 44, 29.6% from 45 to 64, and 14.3% who were 65 or older. The median age was 40.5 years. For every 100 females, there were 99.6 males. For every 100 females 18 and over, there were 97.2 males.

The median income for a household in the city was $60,797, and for a family was $69,841. Males had a median income of $57,619 versus $36,445 for females. The per capita income for the city was $27,863. About 7.3% of families and 9.5% of the population were below the poverty line, including 12.3% of those under 18 and 5.7% of those 65 or over.

== Government and infrastructure ==
Santa Fe City Hall is located at 12002 Highway 6. The city council consists of a mayor and five councilmembers. The Santa Fe Post Office is located at 13002 Highway 6. The Santa Fe Justice Center is located at 3650 FM 646 N.

As per a governmental agreement, Santa Fe receives animal services from the Galveston County Animal Resource Center, an animal shelter operated by the Galveston County Health District in Texas City. This became the case on October 1, 2022. Previously Bayou Animal Services, based in Dickinson, was the animal control service for Santa Fe. Santa Fe had switched from the health district's animal services to Bayou in 2015.

== Education ==
=== Tertiary education ===
As per the Texas Legislature, Santa Fe ISD (which includes the City of Santa Fe) is part of the service district for College of the Mainland, a public community college 8 miles (13 km) away in Texas City.

Also, Alvin Community College is 10 miles (16 km) away in Alvin.

=== Public K-12 schools ===
All of the city is served by the Santa Fe Independent School District.

The schools in the city include:

- R.J. Wollam Elementary School (prekindergarten to grade 5)
- Dan J. Kubacak Elementary (prekindergarten to grade 5, formerly Santa Fe Elementary North)
- Barnett Elementary (prekindergarten to grade 5, newest school in the city)
- Santa Fe Junior High School (grades 6–8)
- Santa Fe High School (grades 9–12)

=== Public libraries ===
The Mae S. Bruce Library at 13302 6th Street was given to the city by Mae S. Bruce. The Santa Fe Community Library opened inside a former World War II army barracks in 1975. By 2011, the barracks became overwhelmed by the library's increasing size. A group of residents established a building committee; with Moody Foundation and Kempner Fund grants and donations from the community, they purchased a 1,920-square-foot (178 m^{2}) metal portable building on land leased from the Santa Fe ISD. The portable library was across from the barracks and by Highway 6. After the library continued to grow, Mae S. Bruce presented a 6,400-square-foot (590 m^{2}) brick structure to the city in 1987. The library moved to the structure, and it was renamed after Bruce.

== Transportation ==
Airports in unincorporated areas near Santa Fe include:

- Creasy Airport
- Varnell Heliport

Airports with scheduled commercial airline service for the area, located in Houston, are William P. Hobby Airport and George Bush Intercontinental Airport. Scholes International Airport in nearby Galveston is available for general aviation and unscheduled commercial service.

== Culture ==
Citing Santa Fe Independent School District v. Doe, in 2019, Skip Hollandworth described Santa Fe as "a deeply conservative community".

== Notable people ==
- D. L. Lang is an American poet who lived in Santa Fe as a child.
- Johnny Lee, a country music star, best known for his 1980 hit single "Lookin' for Love", was raised on a dairy farm in Santa Fe (then part of Alta Loma) and graduated from Santa Fe High School in 1964.
