= Santa Fe Independent School District =

School district in Texas, United States

Address
- 4133 Warpath Avenue Santa Fe, Texas, 77510; United States

District information
- Motto: Prepare. Achieve. Succeed.
- Grades: PK–12
- Superintendent: Dr. Kevin Bott
- Schools: 7
- NCES District ID: 4839270

Students and staff
- Enrollment: 4,397 (2023–2024)
- Teachers: 270.54 (on an FTE basis) (2023–2024)
- Staff: 395.70 (on an FTE basis) (2023–2024)
- Student–teacher ratio: 16.25 (2023–2024)
- District mascot: Indians
- Colors: Green and Gold

Other information
- Website: www.sfisd.org

Santa Fe Independent School District (SFISD) is a public school district based in Santa Fe, Texas, United States, in the Houston metropolitan area. In addition to Santa Fe, the district serves parts of League City, La Marque, Hitchcock, and Dickinson.

In 2009, the school district was rated "academically acceptable" by the Texas Education Agency.

== History ==
The district was a petitioner of the United States Supreme Court case Santa Fe Independent School Dist. v. Doe, which held that student-led, student-initiated prayer at football games violates the Establishment Clause of the United States Constitution.

In 2018, 10 people were killed in the Santa Fe High School shooting.

From the 2017-2018 to the 2018-2019 school years, the enrollment declined by 200 students, with about 100 fewer students at the high school. The shooting and Hurricane Harvey were both factors in the decline.

== Schools ==
=== Primary schools ===
- R.J. Wollam Elementary School, 3400 Avenue S,(Pre-K through 2nd grade)
- Dan J. Kubacak Elementary, 4131 Warpath, (grades 3-5; formerly Santa Fe Elementary North)

=== Secondary schools ===
- Santa Fe Junior High School, 4132 Warpath, (grades 6-8)
- Santa Fe High School, 16000 State Highway 6, (grades 9-12)

=== Former schools ===
- Elizabeth Cowan Elementary, 4133 Warpath, (grades 2-4; formerly Santa Fe Elementary South, closed in 2011 for renovation into the new administration building, students moved to Wollam (2nd graders) and Kubacak (3rd and 4th graders) Elementary campuses)
- Fritz Barnett Intermediate School, 4135 Warpath, (grades 5-6; formerly Santa Fe Intermediate School, closed in 2011, students split between Kubacak Elementary and Santa Fe Junior High)

== School hours ==
Kindergarten through fifth grade runs from 8:15 am to 3:45 pm. Grades six through twelve start school at 7:30 am and get out at 3:05 pm. During the 2010-2011 school year, every Thursday the high school would begin classes at 9:10 and get out at the same time, 2:30, with an adjusted schedule on that day.

== Dress code ==
At the beginning of the 2008 school year, SFISD lifted the dress code for all schools, yet there are still strict guidelines on what the students can wear.

== Effects of Hurricane Ike ==
During Hurricane Ike RJW's roof collapsed, displacing students. Kindergarten students held classes at ECE, and 1st graders at the Junior High. The kindergarten and first graders rode home with the second, third, and fourth graders.

== Police Department ==
Santa Fe Independent School District Police Department is the principal law enforcement agency for the Santa Fe Independent School District. The current chief of police is Ruben Espinoza.
