= Santa Fe Independent School District v. Doe =

Santa Fe Independent School Dist. v. Doe
- Supreme Court of the United States

Argued March 29, 2000 Decided June 19, 2000
- Full case name: Santa Fe Independent School District, Petitioner v. Jane Doe, individually and as next friend for her minor children, Jane and John Doe, et al.
- Citations: 530 U.S. 290 (more) 120 S. Ct. 2266; 147 L. Ed. 2d 295; 2099 U.S. LEXIS 4154

Case history
- Prior: 933 F. Supp. 647 (S.D. Tex. 1996); affirmed in part, reversed in part, 168 F.3d 806 (5th Cir. 1999); rehearing en banc denied, 171 F.3d 1013 (5th Cir. 1999); cert. granted, 529 U.S. 1002 (2000).

Holding
- The policy of the school district "permitting student-led, student-initiated prayer at [public high school] football games violates the Establishment Clause."

Court membership
- Chief Justice William Rehnquist Associate Justices John P. Stevens · Sandra Day O'Connor; Antonin Scalia · Anthony Kennedy; David Souter · Clarence Thomas; Ruth Bader Ginsburg · Stephen Breyer

Case opinions
- Majority: Stevens, joined by O'Connor, Kennedy, Souter, Ginsburg, Breyer
- Dissent: Rehnquist, joined by Scalia, Thomas

Laws applied
- U.S. Const. amend. I

Santa Fe Independent School Dist. v. Doe, 530 U.S. 290 (2000), was a case heard before the United States Supreme Court. It ruled that a policy permitting student-led, student-initiated school prayer at high school football games violates the Establishment Clause of the First Amendment. Oral arguments were heard March 29, 2000. The court announced its decision on June 19, holding the policy unconstitutional in a 6–3 decision.

== Background of the case ==
Santa Fe Independent School District (SFISD) is a rural school district in Texas between the cities of Houston and Galveston. Two sets of students and their mothers — one a member of the Church of Jesus Christ of Latter-day Saints, the other Catholic —filed suit against the school district. The lawsuit alleged various violations of the Establishment Clause and asked for an injunction to prevent prayers from being offered at the graduation ceremony. In his decision, Judge Samuel B. Kent of the United States District Court for the Southern District of Texas ordered the school to eliminate all denominational activity in the classroom. Religion may only be discussed in a "non-denominational and non-judgmental" manner. He also permitted students to offer a non-denominational prayer at graduation ceremonies and football games. In allowing prayer at certain school functions, Judge Kent relied on Jones v. Clear Creek ISD, another school prayer case in a Houston area school district.

The school then adopted a policy in which the students would first vote by secret ballot whether to have a benediction at the graduation. If they voted yes, then they would elect students to deliver "nonsectarian, nonproselytizing invocations and benedictions." The students voted in favor of school prayer, and two students delivered nonsectarian benedictions at the graduation ceremony. Following the ceremony, the school removed the requirement that the prayer be nonsectarian and non-proselytizing. A similar policy was adopted for football games.

=== Fifth Circuit decision ===
Both the SFISD and Doe appealed to the United States Court of Appeals for the Fifth Circuit. The SFISD appealed because it claimed the words "nonsectarian and non-proselytizing" should not be necessary. The Does wanted prayer at school events to be found unconstitutional altogether.

In a 2–1 decision, Jacques L. Wiener, Jr., and Carl E. Stewart agreed with the District Court that "the words 'nonsectarian, non proselytizing' are constitutionally necessary components" of a policy governing prayer at graduations. However, the Appeals Court struck down the part of the decision that permitted prayer at football games. Graduation was a once-in-a-lifetime event that deserved to be solemnized with prayer, while football games were "far less solemn and extraordinary." E. Grady Jolly dissented, objecting that now "the majority expressly exerts control over the content of its citizens' prayers."

The Supreme Court granted certiorari, limited to the following question: "Whether petitioner's policy permitting student-led, student-initiated prayer at football games violates the Establishment Clause."

== Opinion of the Court ==
It held that these pre-game prayers delivered "over the school’s public address system, by a speaker representing the student body, under the supervision of school faculty, and pursuant to a school policy that explicitly and implicitly encourages public prayer" are not private, but public speech. "Regardless of the listener's support for, or objection to, the message, an objective Santa Fe High School student will unquestionably perceive the inevitable pregame prayer as stamped with her school's seal of approval."

A dissenting opinion was written by Chief Justice Rehnquist, joined by Justices Scalia and Thomas. His dissent asserted that the majority opinion "bristles with hostility to all things religious in public life". His material objections were, first that the policy on which the Court has now ruled had not yet been put into practice. "[T]he question is not whether the district's policy may be applied in violation of the Establishment Clause, but whether it inevitably will be." Second, Rehnquist also stated that the speech in question would be private, chosen and delivered by the speaker, rather than public, school-sponsored speech.

== See also ==
- List of United States Supreme Court cases, volume 530
- List of United States Supreme Court cases
- Lists of United States Supreme Court cases by volume
