= Santa Fe High School (Texas) =

Public school in Texas, United States

Location
- 16000 Highway 6 Santa Fe, Texas; United States; 29°23′31″N 95°08′28″W

Information
- Type: Public High School
- Principal: Rachel Blundell
- Teaching staff: 83.64 (FTE)
- Grades: 9-12
- Enrollment: 1,374 (2023–2024)
- Student to teacher ratio: 16.43
- Colors: Green & Gold
- Nickname: Indians
- Website: sfhs.sfisd.org

Santa Fe High School is a high school in Santa Fe, Texas in the Houston metropolitan area. It is part of the Santa Fe Independent School District. In addition to Santa Fe, its district serves parts of League City, La Marque, Hitchcock, and Dickinson.

In 2018, the school became the scene of the third deadliest high school shooting in United States history when a 17 year old junior of the school killed 10 people - 8 students and 2 teachers- before being taken into custody.

== History ==
=== Santa Fe Independent School District v. Doe ===
The high school football team's practice of praying during school-sanctioned sporting events was involved in the court case Santa Fe Independent School District v. Doe, which involved students praying before a football game.

=== Mass shooting and aftermath ===
On May 18, 2018, seventeen-year-old student Dimitrios Pagourtzis opened fire on faculty and staff, killing eight students and two teachers, as well as injuring thirteen others.

As a result of the mass shooting, the district plans to renovate the northwest area of the campus, including sealing off the art rooms in which the shooting occurred as well as the adjacent hallway. A new hallway and counselor's office will be installed. The art classrooms and art teacher offices were to be relocated.

In July 2018, the district decided to install a bulletproof security area at the main entrance, which included adding metal detectors, as well as adding panic buttons, locks, and alarm systems in classrooms. The district chose not to install a security fence.

From the 2017–2018 to the 2018–2019 school years, the enrollment of the high school declined by 100, which was attributed to both the shooting and Hurricane Harvey.

== Demographics ==
As of 2022, the school has 1345 students, with the majority being non-Hispanic white and with 24% being classified as low income.
