= 2022 Louisiana–Monroe Warhawks softball team =

American college softball season

2022 Louisiana–Monroe Warhawks softball
- Conference: Sun Belt Conference
- Record: 27–27 (10–17 SBC)
- Head coach: Molly Fichtner (4th season)
- Assistant coaches: Lea Wodach; Laina Holmgren
- Home stadium: Geo-Surfaces Field at the ULM Softball Complex

2022 Sun Belt Conference softball standings
	Conf.				Overall
Team	W		L	PCT	W		L	PCT
Louisiana ‍†‍‡‍^{y}	23	–	4	.852	47	–	13	.783
South Alabama ‍‍‍	16	–	6	.727	26	–	21	.553
Texas State ‍‍‍	19	–	8	.704	39	–	19	.672
Troy ‍‍‍	15	–	12	.556	32	–	20	.615
UT Arlington ‍‍‍	12	–	15	.444	22	–	28	.440
Appalachian State ‍‍‍	10	–	15	.400	29	–	26	.527
Georgia State ‍‍‍	9	–	15	.375	21	–	34	.382
Louisiana–Monroe ‍‍‍	10	–	17	.370	27	–	27	.500
Coastal Carolina ‍‍‍	7	–	17	.292	25	–	29	.463
Georgia Southern ‍‍‍	6	–	18	.250	13	–	34	.277
† – Conference champion ‡ – Tournament champion y – Invited to the NCAA tournament As of June 5, 2022; Rankings from NFCA/USA Today

The 2022 Louisiana–Monroe Warhawks softball team represented the University of Louisiana at Monroe during the 2022 NCAA Division I softball season. The Warhawks played their home games at Geo-Surfaces Field at the ULM Softball Complex. The Warhawks were led by fourth-year head coach Molly Fichtner and were members of the Sun Belt Conference.

== Preseason ==
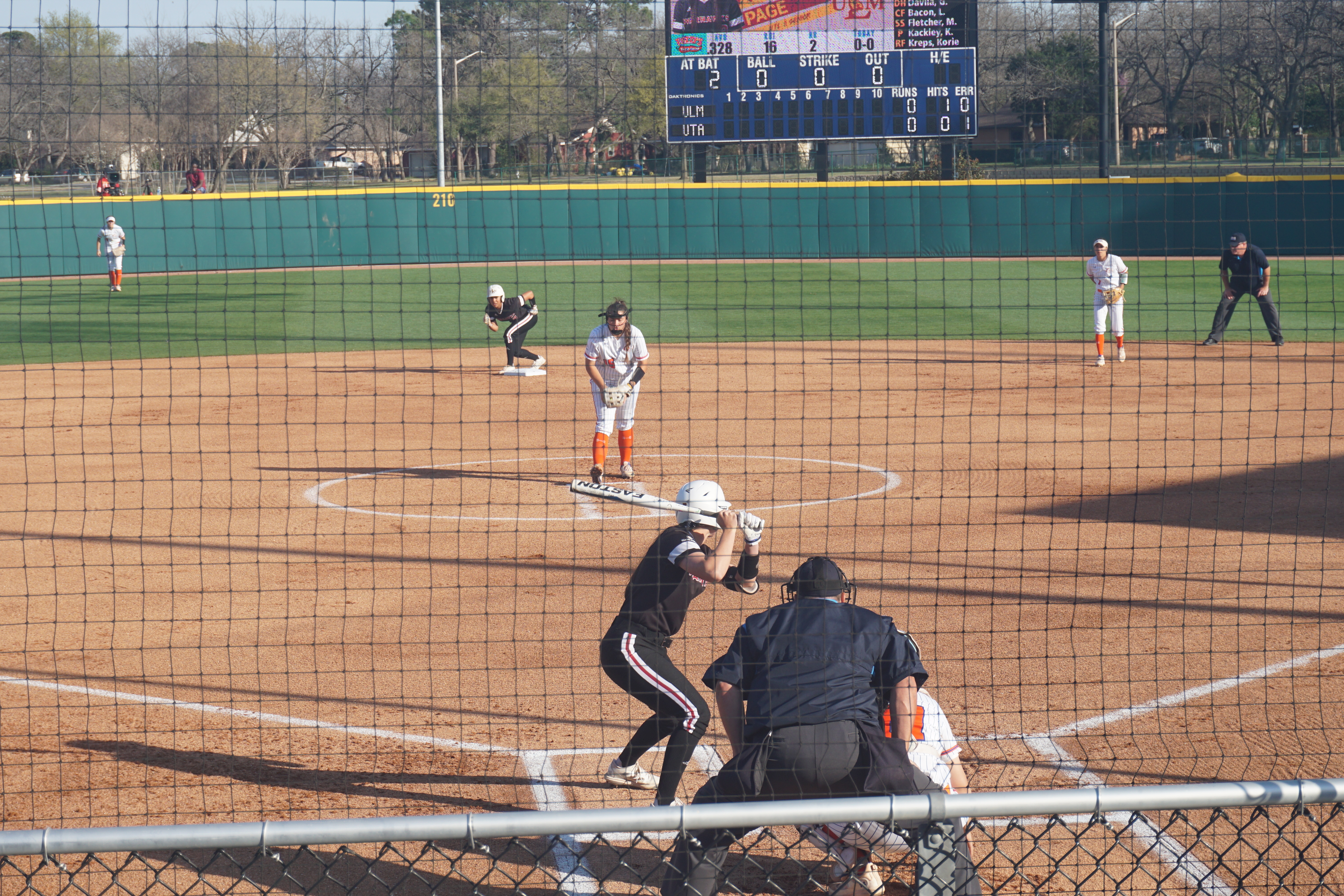
Louisiana–Monroe in action at UT Arlington

=== Sun Belt Conference Coaches Poll ===
The Sun Belt Conference Coaches Poll was released on January 31, 2022. Louisiana–Monroe was picked to finish ninth in the conference with 27 votes.

Coaches poll
Predicted finish	Team	Votes (1st place)
1	Louisiana	97 (7)
2	Texas State	87 (2)
3	Troy	82 (1)
4	South Alabama	74
5	UT Arlington	49
6	Appalachian State	46
7	Coastal Carolina	37
8	Georgia Southern	32
9	Louisiana–Monroe	27
10	Georgia State	19

=== Preseason All-Sun Belt team ===
No players from the Warhawks were chosen to the team.

=== National Softball Signing Day ===
Player	Position	Hometown	Previous Team
Madelyn England	Utility	Lake Charles, Louisiana	Sam Houston HS
Maddie Nichols	Pitcher	West Monroe, Louisiana	West Monroe HS
Emelie Price	Infielder	Longville, Louisiana	South Beauregard HS
Jenna Williams	Catcher/Outfielder	Alabaster, Alabama	Thompson HS

== Personnel ==
2022 Louisiana–Monroe Warhawks softball team
Players
Coaches

#	Pos.	Name	Bats/throws	Height	Year	Home town
1	P	Kassidy Giddens	/	5 ft 3 in (1.6 m)	So	Castor, Louisiana
2	U	Kennedy Page	/	5 ft 7 in (1.7 m)	Sr	Prairieville, Louisiana
3	P	Gianni Hulett	/	5 ft 4 in (1.63 m)	So	Bryant, Arkansas
4	P	Victoria Abrams (redshirt)	/	5 ft 11 in (1.8 m)	Fr	Columbia, Louisiana
5	INF	Andie Edwards	/	5 ft 6 in (1.68 m)	So	Moss Bluff, Louisiana
6	OF	Caley McGuff	/	5 ft 3 in (1.6 m)	So	Spring, Texas
7	INF	Alexis Chavez	/	5 ft 8 in (1.73 m)	Fr	Riverside, California
9	OF	Gabby Davila	/	5 ft 6 in (1.68 m)	Fr	Pearland, Texas
10	C	Kelsey Giddens	/	5 ft 5 in (1.65 m)	So	Castor, Louisiana
11	OF	Lourdes Bacon	/	5 ft 5 in (1.65 m)	So	San Antonio, Texas
13	INF	Jacelyn Buck (redshirt)	/	5 ft 8 in (1.73 m)	Fr	Wellington, Kansas
15	U	Kennedy Johnson	/	5 ft 6 in (1.68 m)	Jr	Houston, Texas
17	INF	Madelyn Fletcher	/	5 ft 4 in (1.63 m)	So	Monroe, Louisiana
18	INF	Ashlan Ard	/	5 ft 10 in (1.78 m)	So	Franklinton, Louisiana
20	INF	Taylor Broddick	/	5 ft 4 in (1.63 m)	So	Madisonville, Louisiana
21	P	Kinsey Kackley	/	5 ft 11 in (1.8 m)	Fr	McKinney, Texas
23	C	Kendall Morton	/	5 ft 6 in (1.68 m)	Jr	Dublin, Georgia
24	P	Adrianna Chavarria	/	5 ft 6 in (1.68 m)	Sr	Pearland, Texas
26	OF	Korie Kreps	/	5 ft 9 in (1.75 m)	Sr	Anacoco, Louisiana
28	C	Madison Blount	/	5 ft 6 in (1.68 m)	So	La Vernia, Texas

Head coach

Molly Fichtner (Alabama)

Assistant coach(es)

Lea Wodach (Oklahoma)
Laina Holmgren (Charleston Southern)

Legend

- (C) Team captain
- (S) Suspended
- (I) Ineligible
- Injured
- Current redshirt

Roster
Last update: 17 June 2022

== Schedule and results ==
Legend
	Louisiana–Monroe win
	Louisiana–Monroe loss
	Postponement/Cancellation/Suspensions
**Bold**	Louisiana–Monroe team member

2022 Louisiana–Monroe Warhawks softball game log
Regular season (27–26)

February (12–4)
Date	Opponent	Rank	Site/stadium	Score	Win	Loss	Save	TV	Attendance	Overall record	SBC record
Best on the Bayou Classic
Feb. 11	Mississippi Valley State		Ouachita Sportsplex • Monroe, LA	**W** 13–1^{5}	**Abrams** (1-0)	Wren (0-1)	None			1–0	
Feb. 12	SIU Edwardsville		Ouachita Sportsplex • Monroe, LA	**W** 9–4	**Chavarria** (1-0)	Baalman (0-1)	None			2–0	
Feb. 12	Morehead State		Ouachita Sportsplex • Monroe, LA	**W** 8–0^{5}	**Giddens** (1-0)	Spicer (0-1)	None			3–0	
Feb. 13	Stephen F. Austin		Ouachita Sportsplex • Monroe, LA	**W** 3–1	**Kackley** (1-0)	Wilbur (0-1)	**Hulett** (1)			4–0	
Feb. 13	Southern		Ouachita Sportsplex • Monroe, LA	**W** 9–1^{6}	**Abrams** (2-0)	Latta (0-1)	None			5–0	
Feb. 16	Jackson State		Geo-Surfaces Field at the ULM Softball Complex • Monroe, LA	**W** 12–0^{5}	**Hulett** (1-0)	Kuppenbender (0-1)	None		327	6–0	
Golden Eagle Invitational
Feb. 18	vs. Houston Baptist		Southern Miss Softball Complex • Hattiesburg, MS	**W** 11–7	**Abrams** (3-0)	Janes (0-2)	None		272	7–0	
Feb. 19	vs. Jacksonville State		Southern Miss Softball Complex • Hattiesburg, MS	**L** 2–3	Carter (3-1)	**Hulett** (2-1)	None		207	7–1	
Feb. 19	vs. Jacksonville State		Southern Miss Softball Complex • Hattiesburg, MS	**W** 5–2	**Abrams** (4-0)	Currie (1-1)	None		317	8–1	
Feb. 20	vs. Mississippi Valley State		Southern Miss Softball Complex • Hattiesburg, MS	**W** 8–3	**Giddens** (2-0)	Page (0-3)	**Hulett** (2)		257	9–1	
Feb. 20	at Southern Miss		Southern Miss Softball Complex • Hattiesburg, MS	**L** 1–8	Leinstock (4-1)	**Kackley** (1-2)	None		674	9–2	
Feb. 22	at Grambling State		GSU Softball Complex • Grambling, LA	**W** 11–4	**Giddens** (3-0)	Richard (2-2)	None		215	10–2	
Auburn Invitational
Feb. 25	vs. Delaware State		Jane B. Moore Stadium • Auburn, AL	**W** 3–1	**Giddens** (4-0)	Hoffman (0-1)	None			11–2	
Feb. 25	at No. 21 Auburn		Jane B. Moore Stadium • Auburn, AL	**L** 0–3	Lowe (6-1)	**Chavarria** (1-1)	None		1,382	11–3	
Feb. 26	vs. Bradley		Jane B. Moore Stadium • Auburn, AL	**W** 3–2	**Kackley** (2-2)	Schaller (1-2)	None			12–3	
Feb. 27	at No. 21 Auburn		Jane B. Moore Stadium • Auburn, AL	**L** 3–7	Penta (7-0)	**Chavarria** (1-2)	Lowe (3)	SECN+	1,484	12–4	

March (6–7)
Date	Opponent	Rank	Site/stadium	Score	Win	Loss	Save	TV	Attendance	Overall record	SBC record
Mar. 1	at Alabama State		Barbara Williams Softball Complex • Montgomery, AL	**W** 4–1^{8}	**Kackley** (3-2)	Greenlee (4-6)	None		137	13–4	
Mar. 2	at Jacksonville State		University Field • Jacksonville, AL	**L** 0–7	Carter (4-3)	**Chavarria** (1-3)	None	ESPN+	149	13–5	
Mar. 11	Georgia Southern		Geo-Surfaces Field at the ULM Softball Complex • Monroe, LA	**L** 4–6^{8}	Belogorska (2–5)	**Hulett** (1-2)	None	ESPN+	403	13–6	0–1
Mar. 12	Georgia Southern		Geo-Surfaces Field at the ULM Softball Complex • Monroe, LA	**W** 10–9	**Chavarria** (2-3)	Belogorska (3-10)	None	ESPN+	526	14–6	1–1
Mar. 13	Georgia Southern		Geo-Surfaces Field at the ULM Softball Complex • Monroe, LA	**W** 10–2^{5}	**Kackley** (8-3)	Richardson (2-7)	None	ESPN+	449	15–6	2–1
Mar. 15	at Alcorn State		Alcorn Softball Complex • Lorman, MS	Game cancelled due to weather issues							
Mar. 15	at Alcorn State		Alcorn Softball Complex • Lorman, MS	Game cancelled due to weather issues							
Mar. 18	at Troy		Troy Softball Complex • Troy, AL	**W** 1–0	**Abrams** **(5-0)**	Johnson (10-3)	None	ESPN+	127	16–6	3–1
Mar. 19	at Troy		Troy Softball Complex • Troy, AL	**L** 1–9^{6}	Johnson (11-3)	**Kackley** (4-2)	None	ESPN+	312	16–7	3–2
Mar. 20	at Troy		Troy Softball Complex • Troy, AL	**L** 4–6	Baker (5-2)	**Abrams** (5-0)	Johnson (2)	ESPN+	307	16–8	3–3
Mar. 23	Southeastern Louisiana		Geo-Surfaces Field at the ULM Softball Complex • Monroe, LA	**W** 4–0	**Kackley** (5-2)	Romano (0-2)	None		382	17–8	
Mar. 25	Appalachian State		Geo-Surfaces Field at the ULM Softball Complex • Monroe, LA	**L** 3–6	Buckner (7-3)	**Chavarria** (2-4)	None		405	17–9	3–4
Mar. 26	Appalachian State		Geo-Surfaces Field at the ULM Softball Complex • Monroe, LA	**L** 6–7	Neas (3-1)	**Kackley** (5-3)	None		410	17–10	3–5
Mar. 27	Appalachian State		Geo-Surfaces Field at the ULM Softball Complex • Monroe, LA	**W** 2–1	**Chavarria** (3-4)	Northrop (3-5)	None		398	18–10	4–5
Mar. 29	at McNeese State		Joe Miller Field at Cowgirl Diamond • Lake Charles, LA	**L** 5–7	Tate (4-7)	**Abrams** (5-2)	Sanders (1)		436	18–11	

April (7–12)
Date	Opponent	Rank	Site/stadium	Score	Win	Loss	Save	TV	Attendance	Overall record	SBC record
Apr. 1	at UT Arlington		Allan Saxe Field • Arlington, TX	**L** 2–3	Adams (8-9)	**Chavarria** (3-5)	None	ESPN+	294	18–12	4–6
Apr. 2	at UT Arlington		Allan Saxe Field • Arlington, TX	**L** 4–5	Bumpurs (6-4)	**Chavarria** (3-6)	None	ESPN+	345	18–13	4–7
Apr. 3	at UT Arlington		Allan Saxe Field • Arlington, TX	**L** 1–2	Adams (9-9)	**Kackley** (5-4)	None	ESPN+	320	18–14	4–8
Apr. 5	Louisiana Tech		Geo-Surfaces Field at the ULM Softball Complex • Monroe, LA	**L** 0–9^{5}	Pickett (16-4)	**Kackley** (5-5)	None			18–15	
Apr. 8	Texas State		Geo-Surfaces Field at the ULM Softball Complex • Monroe, LA	**W** 5–4	**Kackley** (6-5)	Mullins (13-11)	None	ESPN+	436	19–15	5–8
Apr. 9	Texas State		Geo-Surfaces Field at the ULM Softball Complex • Monroe, LA	**W** 10–2^{6}	**Abrams** (6-2)	Pierce (4-4)	None		465	20–15	6–8
Apr. 10	Texas State		Geo-Surfaces Field at the ULM Softball Complex • Monroe, LA	**L** 1–4	Mullins (13-12)	**Abrams** (6-3)	None		448	20–16	6–9
Apr. 14	at Coastal Carolina		St. John Stadium – Charles Wade-John Lott Field • Conway, SC	**W** 11–3^{6}	**Kackley** (7-5)	Volpe (1-3)	None	ESPN+	369	21–16	7–9
Apr. 15	at Coastal Carolina		St. John Stadium – Charles Wade-John Lott Field • Conway, SC	**W** 2–0	**Abrams** (7-3)	Beasley-Polko (8-7)	None	ESPN+	207	22–16	8–9
Apr. 15	at Coastal Carolina		St. John Stadium – Charles Wade-John Lott Field • Conway, SC	**W** 6–3	**Kackley** (8-5)	Volpe (1-4)	None	ESPN+	201	23–16	9–9
Apr. 19	at Mississippi State		Nusz Park • Starkville, MS	**L** 1–2	Fagan (3-1)	**Abrams** (7-4)	None	SECN+	196	23–17	
Apr. 22	South Alabama		Geo-Surfaces Field at the ULM Softball Complex • Monroe, LA	**L** 1–4	Lackie (10-6)	**Kackley** (8-6)	None		426	23–18	9–10
Apr. 23	South Alabama		Geo-Surfaces Field at the ULM Softball Complex • Monroe, LA	**L** 4–5	Hardy (7-8)	**Abrams** (7-5)	Lackie (3)		435	23–19	9–11
Apr. 24	South Alabama		Geo-Surfaces Field at the ULM Softball Complex • Monroe, LA	**L** 0–2	Lackie (11-6)	**Kackley** (8-7)	None		425	23–20	9–12
Apr. 26	Grambling State		Geo-Surfaces Field at the ULM Softball Complex • Monroe, LA	**W** 9–1^{5}	**Kackley** (9-7)	Bonner (1-3)	None		150	24–20	
Apr. 26	Grambling State		Geo-Surfaces Field at the ULM Softball Complex • Monroe, LA	**W** 4–3	**Chavarria** (5-6)	Richard (3-7)	None		235	25–20	
Apr. 27	McNeese State		Geo-Surfaces Field at the ULM Softball Complex • Monroe, LA	**L** 0–3	Vallejo (12-7)	**Abrams** (7-6)	None	ESPN+	325	25–21	
Apr. 29	at Georgia State		Robert E. Heck Softball Complex • Panthersville, GA	**L** 0–3	Buck (7-5)	**Kackley** (8-8)	None		101	25–22	9–13
Apr. 30	at Georgia State		Robert E. Heck Softball Complex • Panthersville, GA	**L** 2–3	Hodnett (4-4)	**Abrams** (7-7)	Mooney (2)		124	25–23	9–14

May (2–3)
Date	Opponent	Rank	Site/stadium	Score	Win	Loss	Save	TV	Attendance	Overall record	SBC record
May 1	at Georgia State		Robert E. Heck Softball Complex • Panthersville, GA	**W** 7–0	**Kackley** (9-8)	Buck (7-6)	None		69	26–23	10–14
May 3	Louisiana Tech		Geo-Surfaces Field at the ULM Softball Complex • Monroe, LA	**W** 3–2^{8}	**Chavarria** (6-6)	Hutchinson (6-7)	None	ESPN+	411	27–23	
May 6	Louisiana		Geo-Surfaces Field at the ULM Softball Complex • Monroe, LA	**L** 1–14^{5}	Landry (17-3)	**Kackley** (9-9)	None		455	27–24	10–15
May 7	Louisiana		Geo-Surfaces Field at the ULM Softball Complex • Monroe, LA	**L** 3–10	Schorman (13-4)	**Abrams** (7-8)	None		585	27–25	10–16
May 7	Louisiana		Geo-Surfaces Field at the ULM Softball Complex • Monroe, LA	**L** 3–10	Landry (18-3)	**Abrams** (7-9)	None		585	27–26	10–17

Post-Season (0–1)

SBC tournament (0–1)
Date	Opponent	(Seed)/Rank	Site/stadium	Score	Win	Loss	Save	TV	Attendance	Overall record	Tournament record
May 10	vs. (9) Coastal Carolina	(8)	Jaguar Field • Mobile, AL	**L** 0–5	Beasley-Polko (13-9)	**Abrams** (7-10)	None	ESPN+	55	27–27	0–1

Schedule source:

*Rankings are based on the team's current ranking in the NFCA/USA Softball poll.
