= University Field =

University Field may refer to:

- University Field (Albany), a multi-purpose stadium at the University of Albany, in Albany, New York
- University Field (Fairfield), a field hockey venue at Fairfield University, in Fairfield, Connecticut
- University Field (Hofstra), a baseball venue at Hofstra University, in Hempstead, New York
- University Field (Jacksonville State), a softball field at Jackson State University, in Jacksonville, Alabama
- University Field (Kutztown), a multi-purpose stadium at Kutztown University, in Kutztown, Pennsylvania
- University Field (Missouri), a softball venue at University of Missouri, in Columbia, Missouri
- University Field (Princeton), a former stadium at Princeton University, in Princeton, New Jersey
- University Field (Stony Brook), a baseball venue at Stony Brook University, in Stony Brook, New York
- University Field (UTEP), a soccer venue at the University of Texas at El Paso
- Denny Field (Alabama), an American football venue at the University of Alabama, in Tuscaloosa, Alabama, originally named University Field
