= 2022 Georgia State Panthers softball team =

American college softball season

2022 Georgia State Panthers softball
- Conference: Sun Belt Conference
- Record: 21–33 (9–15 SBC)
- Head coach: Angie Nicholson (1st season)
- Assistant coaches: Rick Nicholson; Lauren Whitten
- Home stadium: Robert E. Heck Softball Complex

2022 Sun Belt Conference softball standings
	Conf.				Overall
Team	W		L	PCT	W		L	PCT
Louisiana ‍†‍‡‍^{y}	23	–	4	.852	47	–	13	.783
South Alabama ‍‍‍	16	–	6	.727	26	–	21	.553
Texas State ‍‍‍	19	–	8	.704	39	–	19	.672
Troy ‍‍‍	15	–	12	.556	32	–	20	.615
UT Arlington ‍‍‍	12	–	15	.444	22	–	28	.440
Appalachian State ‍‍‍	10	–	15	.400	29	–	26	.527
Georgia State ‍‍‍	9	–	15	.375	21	–	34	.382
Louisiana–Monroe ‍‍‍	10	–	17	.370	27	–	27	.500
Coastal Carolina ‍‍‍	7	–	17	.292	25	–	29	.463
Georgia Southern ‍‍‍	6	–	18	.250	13	–	34	.277
† – Conference champion ‡ – Tournament champion y – Invited to the NCAA tournament As of June 5, 2022; Rankings from NFCA/USA Today

The 2022 Georgia State Panthers softball team represented Georgia State Panthers during the 2022 NCAA Division I softball season. The Panthers played their home games at Robert E. Heck Softball Complex. The Panthers were led by first-year head coach Angie Nicholson and were members of the Sun Belt Conference.

== Preseason ==
=== Sun Belt Conference Coaches Poll ===
The Sun Belt Conference Coaches Poll was released on January 31, 2022. Georgia State was picked to finish tenth in the conference with 19 votes.

Coaches poll
Predicted finish	Team	Votes (1st place)
1	Louisiana	97 (7)
2	Texas State	87 (2)
3	Troy	82 (1)
4	South Alabama	74
5	UT Arlington	49
6	Appalachian State	46
7	Coastal Carolina	37
8	Georgia Southern	32
9	Louisiana–Monroe	27
10	Georgia State	19

=== Preseason All-Sun Belt team ===
- Olivia Lackie (USA, Pitcher)
- Leanna Johnson (TROY, Pitcher)
- Kandra Lamb (LA, Pitcher)
- Jessica Mullins (TXST, Pitcher)
- Kamdyn Kvistad (USA, Catcher)
- Sophie Piskos (LA, Catcher)
- Faith Shirley (GASO, 1st Base)
- Kelly Horne (TROY, 2nd Base)
- Daisy Hess (GSU, Shortstop)
- Sara Vanderford (TXST, 3rd Base)
- Iyanla De Jesus (CCU, Designated Player)
- Raina O'Neal (LA, Outfielder)
- Mackenzie Brasher (USA, Outfielder)
- Emily Brown (GSU, Outfielder)
- Jade Sinness (TROY, Outfielder)

=== National Softball Signing Day ===
Player	Position	Hometown	Previous Team
Samara Ortega	Infielder	Fountain Valley, California	Fountain Valley HS
Skylar Chavez	Outfielder	Orange, California	Villa Park HS
Jackie Gonzalez	Infielder	Orange County, California	Mater Dei HS

== Personnel ==
2022 Georgia State Panthers softball team
Players
Coaches

#	Pos.	Name	Bats/throws	Height	Year	Home town
0	OF	Havalynn Abernathy	L/R	5 ft 7 in (1.7 m)	Fr	Kennesaw, Georgia
1	OF	Chloe Middlebrooks	R/R	5 ft 3 in (1.6 m)	Fr	Bishop, Georgia
2	INF	Emma Yanes	R/R	5 ft 8 in (1.73 m)	Fr	Woodstock, Georgia
3	C	Jaycee Goodwin	R/R	5 ft 4 in (1.63 m)	Fr	Paris, Kentucky
4	OF	Gabby Benson	L/L	5 ft 6 in (1.68 m)	Sr	Buford, Georgia
5	OF	Skylar Chavez	R/R	5 ft 10 in (1.78 m)	Fr	Orange, California
6	INF	Bailee Richardson	R/R	5 ft 7 in (1.7 m)	Jr	Locust Grove, Georgia
7	C	Sofia Tunon	R/R	5 ft 8 in (1.73 m)	Jr	Woodstock, Georgia
10	RHP	Sophie Mooney	R/R	5 ft 11 in (1.8 m)	Jr	Lawrenceville, Georgia
11	RHP	Elle Doolittle	R/R	5 ft 10 in (1.78 m)	So	Macon, Georgia
12	INF	Abby Brown	R/R	5 ft 6 in (1.68 m)	Fr	Tallapoosa, Georgia
13	RHP	Emily Buck (redshirt)	R/R	5 ft 7 in (1.7 m)	Jr	Woodstock, Georgia
14	C	Carolyn Deady	R/R	6 ft 1 in (1.85 m)	So	Marietta, Georgia
15	OF	Alice Thomas	L/R	5 ft 2 in (1.57 m)	Fr	Warner Robins, Georgia
16	INF	Jackie Gonzalez	R/R	5 ft 4 in (1.63 m)	Fr	Orange County, California
18	OF	Caroline Brownlee	R/R	5 ft 6 in (1.68 m)	So	Hoschton, Georgia
19	OF	Emily Brown	L/R	5 ft 6 in (1.68 m)	Jr	Suwanee, Georgia
21	C	Kalynn Hicks	R/R	5 ft 7 in (1.7 m)	Sr	Marietta, Georgia
22	INF	Daisy Hess	R/R	5 ft 11 in (1.8 m)	Jr	Acworth, Georgia
23	OF	Alyssa Giles	L/L	5 ft 7 in (1.7 m)	So	Brunswick, Georgia
25	RHP	Hallie Adams	R/R	5 ft 6 in (1.68 m)	Fr	Marietta, Georgia
27	RHP	Emily Hodnett	R/R	5 ft 11 in (1.8 m)	Fr	Auburn, Georgia
33	RHP	Julia Allen	R/R	5 ft 11 in (1.8 m)	Jr	Fayetteville, Georgia
44	INF	Gracie Kittrell	R/R	5 ft 2 in (1.57 m)	Jr	Marietta, Georgia
55	RHP	Savannah Freeman (redshirt)	R/R	5 ft 4 in (1.63 m)	Sr	Powder Springs, Georgia
88	INF	Samara Ortega	R/R	5 ft 6 in (1.68 m)	Fr	Orange, California
99	OF	Mallory Fletcher	R/R	5 ft 8 in (1.73 m)	Fr	Coolidge, Georgia

Head coach

Angie Nicholson (Cleveland State)

Assistant coach(es)

Rick Nicholson (Cleveland State)
Lauren Whitten (Michigan State)

Legend

- (C) Team captain
- (S) Suspended
- (I) Ineligible
- Injured
- Current redshirt

Roster
Last update: 11 June 2022

== Schedule and results ==
Legend
	Georgia State win
	Georgia State loss
	Postponement/Cancellation/Suspensions
**Bold**	Georgia State team member

2022 Georgia State Panthers softball game log
Regular season (19–31)

February (5–7)
Date	Opponent	Rank	Site/stadium	Score	Win	Loss	Save	TV	Attendance	Overall record	SBC record
Stetson Lead-Off Classic
Feb. 11	vs. Indiana State		Patricia Wilson Field • DeLand, FL	**W** 12–3	**Hodnett** (1-0)	Newbanks (0-1)	None		140	1–0	
Feb. 11	at Stetson		Patricia Wilson Field • DeLand, FL	**L** 2–8	Tino (1-0)	**Mooney** (0-1)	None	ESPN+	350	1–1	
Feb. 12	vs. Indiana State		Patricia Wilson Field • DeLand, FL	**L** 0–2	**Benko** (1-1)	Buck (0-1)	None		122	1–2	
Feb. 12	vs. Delaware		Patricia Wilson Field • DeLand, FL	**L** 1–4	Christian (1-0)	**Hodnett** (1-1)	Frost (1)		160	1–3	
Feb. 13	at Stetson		Patricia Wilson Field • DeLand, FL	**L** 6–7	Tino (2-0)	**Buck** (0-2)	None	ESPN+	125	1–4	
Feb. 16	at Western Carolina		Catamount Softball Complex • Cullowhee, NC	**L** 1–5	Rice (2-0)	**Hodnett** (1-2)	None		75	1–5	
Feb. 16	at Western Carolina		Catamount Softball Complex • Cullowhee, NC	**W** 2–1	**Allen** (1-0)	Eilers (3-1)	None		75	2–5	
Feb. 23	at Georgia Tech		Shirley Clements Mewborn Stadium • Atlanta, GA	**L** 1–9	Neleman (6-1)	**Buck** (0-3)	None	ACCN	277	2–6	
I-75 Challenge
Feb. 25	at Kennesaw State		Bailey Park • Kennesaw, GA	**L** 6–8	Perrin (1-0)	**Mooney** (0-2)	None	YouTube	575	2–7	
Feb. 25	vs. East Tennessee State		Bailey Park • Kennesaw, GA	**W** 6–2	**Buck** (1-2)	Tucker (1-2)	None	YouTube	400	3–7	
Feb. 26	Jacksonville State		Robert E. Heck Softball Complex • Decatur, GA	**W** 5–3	**Buck** (2-3)	Carter (3-3)	None		173	4–7	
Feb. 26	Jacksonville State		Robert E. Heck Softball Complex • Decatur, GA	**W** 8–3	**Adams** (1-0)	Androlevich (2-2)	None		195	5–7	
Feb. 27	Penn State		Robert E. Heck Softball Complex • Decatur, GA	Game cancelled							

March (7–10)
Date	Opponent	Rank	Site/stadium	Score	Win	Loss	Save	TV	Attendance	Overall record	SBC record
Mar. 2	No. 20 Auburn		Robert E. Heck Softball Complex • Decatur, GA	**L** 1–9	Penta (8-0)	**Mooney** (0-3)	None		245	5–8	
Bubly Invitational
Mar. 4	vs. Tennessee State		Katie Seashole Pressly Softball Stadium • Gainesville, FL	**W** 3–0	**Buck** (3-3)	King (1-3)	None			6–8	
Mar. 4	at No. 3 Florida		Katie Seashole Pressly Softball Stadium • Gainesville, FL	**L** 1–3	Mesiemore (2-0)	**Adams** (1-1)	None			6–9	
Mar. 5	vs. Coastal Carolina		Katie Seashole Pressly Softball Stadium • Gainesville, FL	**W** 3–2	**Buck** (4-3)	Beasley-Polko (4-3)	None		1,301	7–9	
Mar. 6	vs. Tennessee State		Katie Seashole Pressly Softball Stadium • Gainesville, FL	**L** 4–5	Loveless (3-6)	**Buck** (4-4)	None			7–10	
Mar. 6	at No. 3 Florida		Katie Seashole Pressly Softball Stadium • Gainesville, FL	**L** 0–8^{5}	Delbrey (7-1)	**Adams** (1-3)	None		1,508	7–11	
Mar. 9	at No. 15 Georgia		Jack Turner Stadium • Athens, GA	**L** 2–6	Kerpics (7-1)	**Adams** (1-2)	None	SECN+	439	7–12	
Mar. 11	at No. 22 Louisiana		Yvette Girouard Field at Lamson Park • Lafayette, LA	**W** 4–1	**Adams** (2-2)	Lamb (4-3)	None		1,439	8–12	1–0
Mar. 12	at No. 22 Louisiana		Yvette Girouard Field at Lamson Park • Lafayette, LA	**L** 6–10	Schorman (4-1)	**Mooney** (0-4)	Foreman (1)		1,733	8–13	1–1
Mar. 13	at No. 22 Louisiana		Yvette Girouard Field at Lamson Park • Lafayette, LA	**L** 0–9^{5}	Lamb (5-3)	**Adams** (2-3)	None		1,817	8–14	1–2
Mar. 15	at Chattanooga		Jim Frost Stadium • Chattanooga, TN	**L** 3–5	Wood (2-5)	**Hodnett** (1-2)	None	ESPN+	237	8–15	
Mar. 15	at Chattanooga		Jim Frost Stadium • Chattanooga, TN	**L** 1–5	Alley (3-6)	**Adams** (2-4)	None	ESPN+	318	8–16	
Mar. 17	Dartmouth		Robert E. Heck Softball Complex • Decatur, GA	**W** 9–0^{6}	**Adams** (3-4)	Plonka (1-6)	None		61	9–16	
Mar. 17	Dartmouth		Robert E. Heck Softball Complex • Decatur, GA	**W** 6–0	**Mooney** (1-4)	McCarroll (0-1)	None		67	10–16	
Mar. 18	Appalachian State		Robert E. Heck Softball Complex • Decatur, GA	**L** 0–11^{5}	Buckner (6-2)	**Adams** (2-5)	None		81	10–17	1–3
Mar. 19	Appalachian State		Robert E. Heck Softball Complex • Decatur, GA	**W** 6–2	**Mooney** (2-4)	Nichols (3-3)	None		85	11–17	2–3
Mar. 20	Appalachian State		Robert E. Heck Softball Complex • Decatur, GA	**W** 8–5	**Hodnett** (2-3)	Northrop (3-4)	**Buck** (1)		87	12–17	3–3
Mar. 25	South Alabama		Robert E. Heck Softball Complex • Decatur, GA	Game postponed							
Mar. 26	South Alabama		Robert E. Heck Softball Complex • Decatur, GA	Game cancelled							
Mar. 27	South Alabama		Robert E. Heck Softball Complex • Decatur, GA	Game cancelled							

April (6–11)
Date	Opponent	Rank	Site/stadium	Score	Win	Loss	Save	TV	Attendance	Overall record	SBC record
Apr. 1	at Troy		Troy Softball Complex • Troy, AL	**L** 0–1	Johnson (14-4)	**Adams** (3-6)	None	ESPN+	117	12–18	3–4
Apr. 2	at Troy		Troy Softball Complex • Troy, AL	**L** 2–4	Baker (6-3)	**Mooney** (2-5)	None	ESPN+	212	12–19	3–5
Apr. 3	at Troy		Troy Softball Complex • Troy, AL	**W** 4–0	**Adams** (4-6)	Johnson (14-5)	None	ESPN+	227	13–19	4–5
Apr. 6	at No. 17 Auburn		Jane B. Moore Field • Auburn, AL	Game cancelled							
Apr. 8	UT Arlington		Robert E. Heck Softball Complex • Decatur, GA	**L** 1–5	Adams (10-10)	**Adams** (4-7)	None		110	13–20	4–6
Apr. 9	UT Arlington		Robert E. Heck Softball Complex • Decatur, GA	**W** 11–5	**Buck** (5-4)	Bumpurs (6-5)	**Mooney** (1)		192	14–20	5–6
Apr. 10	UT Arlington		Robert E. Heck Softball Complex • Decatur, GA	**W** 8–7^{8}	**Buck** (5-4)	Adams (10-11)	None		123	15–20	6–6
Apr. 12	Alabama State		Robert E. Heck Softball Complex • Decatur, GA	**W** 10–6	**Hodnett** (3-2)	Lundsford (3-6)	None		103	16–20	
Apr. 14	at Texas State		Bobcat Softball Complex • San Marcos, TX	**L** 2–3	Mullins (15-11)	**Adams** (4-8)	None	ESPN+	392	16–21	6–7
Apr. 15	at Texas State		Bobcat Softball Complex • San Marcos, TX	**L** 0–8^{5}	Pierce (5-4)	**Buck** (6-5)	None	ESPN+	378	16–22	6–8
Apr. 16	at Texas State		Bobcat Softball Complex • San Marcos, TX	**L** 0–3	Mullins (16-11)	**Adams** (4-9)	None	ESPN+	414	16–23	6–9
Apr. 20	Georgia Tech		Robert E. Heck Softball Complex • Decatur, GA	**L** 0–3	Dennis (14-4)	**Allen** (1-1)	Neleman (4)		127	16–24	
Apr. 22	at Coastal Carolina		St. John Stadium – Charles Wade-John Lott Field • Conway, SC	**L** 2–3	Beasley-Polko (9-7)	**Adams** (4-10)	None	ESPN+	216	16–25	6–10
Apr. 23	at Coastal Carolina		St. John Stadium – Charles Wade-John Lott Field • Conway, SC	**L** 10–12	Volpe (2-4)	**Hodnett** (3-4)	None	ESPN+	317	16–26	6–11
Apr. 24	at Coastal Carolina		St. John Stadium – Charles Wade, John Lott Field • Conway, SC	**L** 2–8	Beasley-Polko (10-7)	**Adams** (4-11)	None	ESPN+	131	16–27	6–12
Apr. 27	Kennesaw State		Robert E. Heck Softball Complex • Decatur, GA	**L** 2–6	Bennett (11-14)	**Adams** (4-12)	Kyte (1)		63	16–28	
Apr. 29	Louisiana–Monroe		Robert E. Heck Softball Complex • Decatur, GA	**W** 3–0	**Buck** (7-5)	Kackley (8-8)	None		101	17–28	7–12
Apr. 30	Louisiana–Monroe		Robert E. Heck Softball Complex • Decatur, GA	**W** 3–2	**Hodnett** (4-4)	Abrams (7-7)	**Mooney** (2)		124	18–28	8–12

May (1–3)
Date	Opponent	Rank	Site/stadium	Score	Win	Loss	Save	TV	Attendance	Overall record	SBC record
May 1	Louisiana–Monroe		Robert E. Heck Softball Complex • Decatur, GA	**L** 0–7	Kackley (9-8)	**Buck** (7-6)	None		69	18–29	8–13
May 5	at Georgia Southern		Eagle Field at GS Softball Complex • Statesboro, GA	**L** 2–3	Belogorska (6-13)	**Buck** (7-7)	None	ESPN+	203	18–30	8–14
May 6	at Georgia Southern		Eagle Field at GS Softball Complex • Statesboro, GA	**L** 3–8	Waldrep (6-13)	**Mooney** (2-6)	None	ESPN+	219	18–31	8–15
May 7	at Georgia Southern		Eagle Field at GS Softball Complex • Statesboro, GA	**W** 4–3	**Adams** (5-12)	Belogorska (6-14)	None	ESPN+	315	19–31	9–15

Post-Season (2–2)

SBC tournament (2–2)
Date	Opponent	(Seed)/Rank	Site/stadium	Score	Win	Loss	Save	TV	Attendance	Overall record	Tournament record
May 10	vs. (10) Georgia Southern	(7)	Jaguar Field • Mobile, AL	**W** 9–1^{6}	**Buck** (8-7)	Waldrep (6-14)	None	ESPN+	46	20–31	1–0
May 11	vs. (2) South Alabama	(7)	Jaguar Field • Mobile, AL	**L** 2–10^{5}	Lackie (15-7)	**Adams** (5-13)	None	ESPN+	487	20–32	1–1
May 12	vs. (5) UT Arlington	(7)	Jaguar Field • Mobile, AL	**W** 5–3	**Buck** (9-7)	Max (4-3)	None	ESPN+	44	21–32	2–1
May 13	vs. (4) Troy	(7)	Jaguar Field • Mobile, AL	**L** 0–5	Baker (9-5)	**Buck** (9-8)	None	ESPN+	129	21–33	2–2

Schedule source:

*Rankings are based on the team's current ranking in the NFCA/USA Softball poll.
