= 2022 Georgia Southern Eagles softball team =

American college softball season

2022 Georgia Southern Eagles softball
- Conference: Sun Belt Conference
- Record: 13–34 (6–18 SBC)
- Head coach: Sharon Perkins (1st season)
- Assistant coaches: Mary Beth Dennison; Heather Gelbard
- Home stadium: Eagle Field at GS Softball Complex

2022 Sun Belt Conference softball standings
	Conf.				Overall
Team	W		L	PCT	W		L	PCT
Louisiana ‍†‍‡‍^{y}	23	–	4	.852	47	–	13	.783
South Alabama ‍‍‍	16	–	6	.727	26	–	21	.553
Texas State ‍‍‍	19	–	8	.704	39	–	19	.672
Troy ‍‍‍	15	–	12	.556	32	–	20	.615
UT Arlington ‍‍‍	12	–	15	.444	22	–	28	.440
Appalachian State ‍‍‍	10	–	15	.400	29	–	26	.527
Georgia State ‍‍‍	9	–	15	.375	21	–	34	.382
Louisiana–Monroe ‍‍‍	10	–	17	.370	27	–	27	.500
Coastal Carolina ‍‍‍	7	–	17	.292	25	–	29	.463
Georgia Southern ‍‍‍	6	–	18	.250	13	–	34	.277
† – Conference champion ‡ – Tournament champion y – Invited to the NCAA tournament As of June 5, 2022; Rankings from NFCA/USA Today

The 2022 Georgia Southern Eagles softball team represented Georgia Southern University during the 2022 NCAA Division I softball season. The Eagles played their home games at Eagle Field at GS Softball Complex. The Eagles were led by first-year head coach Sharon Perkins and were members of the Sun Belt Conference.

== Preseason ==
=== Sun Belt Conference Coaches Poll ===
The Sun Belt Conference Coaches Poll was released on January 31, 2022. Georgia Southern was picked to finish eighth in the conference with 32 votes.

Coaches poll
Predicted finish	Team	Votes (1st place)
1	Louisiana	97 (7)
2	Texas State	87 (2)
3	Troy	82 (1)
4	South Alabama	74
5	UT Arlington	49
6	Appalachian State	46
7	Coastal Carolina	37
8	Georgia Southern	32
9	Louisiana–Monroe	27
10	Georgia State	19

=== Preseason All-Sun Belt team ===
- Olivia Lackie (USA, Pitcher)
- Leanna Johnson (TROY, Pitcher)
- Kandra Lamb (LA, Pitcher)
- Jessica Mullins (TXST, Pitcher)
- Kamdyn Kvistad (USA, Catcher)
- Sophie Piskos (LA, Catcher)
- Faith Shirley (GASO, 1st Base)
- Kelly Horne (TROY, 2nd Base)
- Daisy Hess (GSU, Shortstop)
- Sara Vanderford (TXST, 3rd Base)
- Iyanla De Jesus (CCU, Designated Player)
- Raina O'Neal (LA, Outfielder)
- Mackenzie Brasher (USA, Outfielder)
- Emily Brown (GSU, Outfielder)
- Jade Sinness (TROY, Outfielder)

|}

=== National Softball Signing Day ===
Player	Position	Hometown	Previous Team
Alana Barnard	Pitcher	Statesboro, Georgia	Southeast Bulloch HS
Emma Davis	Outfielder	Grayson, Georgia	Grayson HS
Bailey Holland	Pitcher	Vidalia, Georgia	Vidalia HS
Baileigh Pitts	Catcher/Utility	Ringgold, Georgia	Ringgold HS
Brooke Kell	Outfielder/Infielder	Marietta, Georgia	Carlton J. Kell HS
Janiyah Strong	Infielder/Utility	Lagrange, Georgia	Heard County HS

== Personnel ==
2022 Georgia Southern Eagles softball team
Players
Coaches

#	Pos.	Name	Bats/throws	Height	Year	Home town
1	INF	Courtney Ball	R/R	5 ft 6 in (1.68 m)	Jr	Macon, Georgia
4	OF	Jess Mazur	R/R	5 ft 10 in (1.78 m)	Sr	Palatine, Illinois
5	INF	Olivia Creamer	R/R	5 ft 5 in (1.65 m)	Sr	St. Johns, Florida
19	U	Sam Vinson	R/R	5 ft 6 in (1.68 m)	Sr	Jefferson, Georgia
20	C	Janai Conklin	R/R	5 ft 3 in (1.6 m)	Sr	Miami, Florida
23	RHP	Kastin Belogorska	R/R	5 ft 7 in (1.7 m)	Sr	Eden, Georgia
24	INF	Reign Williams	R/R	5 ft 7 in (1.7 m)	So	Buckhead, Georgia
26	OF	Chandler Caldwell	L/R	5 ft 4 in (1.63 m)	Sr	Suwanee, Georgia
31	RHP	Kyleigh Richardson	R/R	5 ft 9 in (1.75 m)	Sr	Stafford, Virginia
42	OF	Dejah Mills	R/R	5 ft 5 in (1.65 m)	Jr	Powder Springs, Georgia
99	OF	Madi Banks	L/R	5 ft 9 in (1.75 m)	Jr	Warner Robins, Georgia
	RHP	Alana Barnard	R/R	5 ft 10 in (1.78 m)	Fr	Statesboro, Georgia
	OF	Emma Davis	L/L	5 ft 3 in (1.6 m)	Fr	Grayson, Georgia
	RHP	Bailey Holland	L/R	5 ft 9 in (1.75 m)	Fr	Vidalia, Georgia
	OF	Brooke Kell	L/R	5 ft 6 in (1.68 m)	Fr	Marietta, Georgia
	C	Baileigh Pitts	R/R	5 ft 6 in (1.68 m)	Fr	Ringgold, Georgia
	OF	Kinley Stewart (redshirt)	R/R	5 ft 8 in (1.73 m)	Jr	Loganville, Georgia
	INF	Janiyah Strong	R/R	5 ft 6 in (1.68 m)	Fr	LaGrange, Georgia

Head coach

Sharon Perkins (Nicholls State)

Assistant coach(es)

Mary Beth Dennison (Georgia Southern)
Heather Gelbard (Barry)

Legend

- (C) Team captain
- (S) Suspended
- (I) Ineligible
- Injured
- Current redshirt

Roster
Last update: 18 June 2022

== Schedule and results ==
Legend
	Georgia Southern win
	Georgia Southern loss
	Postponement/Cancellation/Suspensions
**Bold**	Georgia Southern team member

2022 Georgia Southern Eagles softball game log
Regular season (13–33)

February (4–6)
Date	Opponent	Rank	Site/stadium	Score	Win	Loss	Save	TV	Attendance	Overall record	SBC record
Bash in the Boro
Feb. 11	Binghampton		Eagle Field at GS Softball Complex • Statesboro, GA	**W** 7–4	**Waldrep** (1-0)	Walter (0-1)	None	ESPN+	326	1–0	
Feb. 12	Binghamton		Eagle Field at GS Softball Complex • Statesboro, GA	**L** 1–5	L'Amoreaux (2-0)	**Belogorska** (0-1)	None	ESPN3	409	1–1	
Feb. 12	Radford		Eagle Field at GS Softball Complex • Statesboro, GA	**W** 6–0	**Richardson** (1-0)	Marvin (1-0)	None	ESPN3	447	2–1	
Feb. 13	East Tennessee State		Eagle Field at GS Softball Complex • Statesboro, GA	**W** 4–0	**Belogorska** (1-1)	Tucker (0-1)	None	ESPN+	135	3–1	
Feb. 13	Radford		Eagle Field at GS Softball Complex • Statesboro, GA	**L** 1–7	Spingarn (2-0)	**Waldrep** (1-1)	None	ESPN+	211	3–2	
Gata Challenge
Feb. 18	Maine		Eagle Field at GS Softball Complex • Statesboro, GA	**W** 9–4	**Waldrep** (2-1)	Siciliano (0-1)	**Belogorska** (1)	ESPN+	218	4–2	
Feb. 18	UT Martin		Eagle Field at GS Softball Complex • Statesboro, GA	**L** 3–4	Groet (2-1)	**Richardson** (1-1)	None	ESPN+	212	4–3	
Feb. 19	UT Martin		Eagle Field at GS Softball Complex • Statesboro, GA	**L** 4–12^{6}	Gallagher (1-0)	**Belogorska** (1-2)	None	ESPN3	252	4–4	
Feb. 19	Maine		Eagle Field at GS Softball Complex • Statesboro, GA	**L** 4–14	Siciliano (1-1)	**Richardson** (1-2)	None	ESPN3	274	4–5	
Feb. 20	North Dakota State		Eagle Field at GS Softball Complex • Statesboro, GA	**L** 0–5	Schulz (2-0)	**Belogorska** (1-3)	None	ESPN+	269	4–6	
Feb. 23	South Carolina		Eagle Field at GS Softball Complex • Statesboro, GA	Game postponed							
Georgia Classic
Feb. 25	vs. Bryant		Jack Turner Stadium • Athens, GA	Game cancelled							
Feb. 25	vs. North Carolina		Jack Turner Stadium • Athens, GA	Game cancelled							
Feb. 26	at No. 19 Georgia		Jack Turner Stadium • Athens, GA	Game postponed							
Feb. 26	vs. Bryant		Jack Turner Stadium • Athens, GA	Game cancelled							
Feb. 27	at No. 19 Georgia		Jack Turner Stadium • Athens, GA	Game cancelled							

March (4–12)
Date	Opponent	Rank	Site/stadium	Score	Win	Loss	Save	TV	Attendance	Overall record	SBC record
Mar. 3	at Jacksonville		Debbie and Fred Pruitt Softball Complex • Jacksonville, FL	**L** 5–6	Harpe (1-6)	**Belogorska** (1-4)	None		101	4–7	
The Spring Games at Madeira Beach
Mar. 4	vs. Albany		R. O. C. Park • Madeira Beach, FL	**L** 1–2	Hammond (2-2)	**Belogorska** (1-5)	None		67	4–8	
Mar. 5	vs. Rhode Island		R. O. C. Park • Madeira Beach, FL	**W** 1–0	**Waldrep** (3-1)	Lynchard (3-5)	None		50	5–8	
Mar. 5	vs. Southern Miss		R. O. C. Park • Madeira Beach, FL	**L** 1–8	Lee (5-3)	**Richardson** (1-3)	None		102	5–9	
Mar. 6	vs. Nebraska–Omaha		R. O. C. Park • Madeira Beach, FL	**L** 0–3	Meyer (6-2)	**Waldrep** (3-2)	None		50	5–10	
Mar. 6	vs. Middle Tennessee		R. O. C. Park • Madeira Beach, FL	**L** 8–9^{8}	Ahlstrom (2-0)	**Richardson** (1-4)	None		56	5–11	
Mar. 11	at Louisiana–Monroe		Geo-Surfaces Field at the ULM Softball Complex • Monroe, LA	**W** 6–4^{8}	**Belogorska** (2-5)	Hulett (1-2)	None	ESPN+	403	6–11	1–0
Mar. 12	at Louisiana–Monroe		Geo-Surfaces Field at the ULM Softball Complex • Monroe, LA	**L** 9–10	Chavarria (2-3)	**Belogorska** (2-6)	None	ESPN+	526	6–12	1–1
Mar. 13	at Louisiana–Monroe		Geo-Surfaces Field at the ULM Softball Complex • Monroe, LA	**L** 2–10^{5}	Kackley (8-3)	**Richardson** (1-5)	None	ESPN+	449	6–13	1–2
Mar. 19	No. 23 Louisiana		Eagle Field at GS Softball Complex • Statesboro, GA	**L** 3–11^{6}	Landry (6-2)	**Belogorska** (2-7)	None	ESPN+	351	6–14	1–3
Mar. 19	No. 23 Louisiana		Eagle Field at GS Softball Complex • Statesboro, GA	**W** 12–10	**Belogorska** (3-7)	Schorman (4-2)	None	ESPN+	351	7–14	2—3
Mar. 20	No. 23 Louisiana		Eagle Field at GS Softball Complex • Statesboro, GA	**L** 1–12^{6}	Landry (7-2)	**Waldrep** (3-3)	None	ESPN+	351	7–15	2–4
Mar. 25	Troy		Eagle Field at GS Softball Complex • Statesboro, GA	**L** 0–9	Johnson (12-4)	**Belogorska** (3-8)	None	ESPN+	273	7–16	2–5
Mar. 26	Troy		Eagle Field at GS Softball Complex • Statesboro, GA	**W** 2–1	**Waldrep** (4-3)	Baker (5-3)	None	ESPN+	303	8–16	3–5
Mar. 27	Troy		Eagle Field at GS Softball Complex • Statesboro, GA	**L** 1–3	Johnson (13-4)	**Waldrep** (4-4)	None	ESPN+	344	8–17	3–6
Mar. 30	at No. 15 Georgia		Jack Turner Stadium • Athens, GA	**L** 7–12	Macy (8-1)	**Waldrep** (4-5)	None	SECN+	709	8–18	

April (3–13)
Date	Opponent	Rank	Site/stadium	Score	Win	Loss	Save	TV	Attendance	Overall record	SBC record
Apr. 1	at Appalachian		Sywassink/Lloyd Family Stadium • Boone, NC	**L** 1–2^{8}	Neas (4-1)	**Belogorksa** (3-9)	None		252	8–19	3–7
Apr. 2	at Appalachian State		Sywassink/Lloyd Family Stadium • Boone, NC	**L** 1–7	Buckner (8-4)	**Waldrep** (4-6)	None		277	8–20	3–8
Apr. 3	at Appalachian State		Sywassink/Lloyd Family Stadium • Boone, NC	**W** 11–8	**Waldrep** (5-6)	Buckner (8-5)	None		220	9–20	4–8
Apr. 6	at Charleston Southern		CSU Softball Complex • North Charleston, SC	**L** 0–2^{5}	Holtorf (4-3)	**Waldrep** (5-7)	None		102	9–21	
Apr. 8	Coastal Carolina		Eagle Field at GS Softball Complex • Statesboro, GA	Game postponed							
Apr. 9	Coastal Carolina		Eagle Field at GS Softball Complex • Statesboro, GA	Game postponed							
Apr. 10	Coastal Carolina		Eagle Field at GS Softball Complex • Statesboro, GA	Game postponed							
Apr. 15	at UT Arlington		Allan Saxe Field • Arlington, TX	**L** 0–5	Adams (11-11)	**Waldrep** (6-6)	None		254	9–22	4–9
Apr. 16	at UT Arlington		Allan Saxe Field • Arlington, TX	**L** 5–9	Max (1-0)	**Richardson** (1-6)	None	ESPN+	156	9–23	4–10
Apr. 16	at UT Arlington		Allan Saxe Field • Arlington, TX	**L** 0–6^{6}	Adams (12-11)	**Waldrep** (6-7)	None	ESPN+	300	9–24	4–11
Apr. 20	North Florida		Eagle Field at GS Softball Complex • Statesboro, GA	**L** 1–2^{8}	Arends (17-3)	**Waldrep** (5-10)	None	ESPN+	240	9–25	
Apr. 20	North Florida		Eagle Field at GS Softball Complex • Statesboro, GA	**L** 0–12^{5}	Clausen (12-3)	**Waldrep** (5-11)	None	ESPN+	240	9–26	
Apr. 22	Texas State		Eagle Field at GS Softball Complex • Statesboro, GA	**L** 0–2	Mullins (18-11)	**Belogorska** (3-10)	None	ESPN+	234	9–27	4–12
Apr. 23	Texas State		Eagle Field at GS Softball Complex • Statesboro, GA	**L** 1–5	Mullins (19-11)	**Waldrep** (5-12)	None	ESPN+	226	9–28	4–13
Apr. 24	Texas State		Eagle Field at GS Softball Complex • Statesboro, GA	**L** 1–11^{5}	Mullins (20-11)	**Belogorska** (3-11)	None	ESPN+	185	9–29	4–14
Apr. 26	at Mercer		Sikes Field • Macon, GA	**W** 17–5^{6}	**Belogorska** (4-11)	Hickok (2-10)	None		200	10–29	
Apr. 26	at Mercer		Sikes Field • Macon, GA	**W** 6–5	**Belogorska** (5-11)	Rearley (6-6)	None		200	11–29	
Apr. 29	at South Alabama		Jaguar Field • Mobile, AL	**L** 1–8	Lackie (12-6)	**Belogorska** (5-12)	None	ESPN+	323	11–30	4–15
Apr. 30	at South Alabama		Jaguar Field • Mobile, AL	**L** 1–3	Hardy (8-8)	**Waldrep** (5-13)	None	ESPN+	441	11–31	4–16

May (2–2)
Date	Opponent	Rank	Site/stadium	Score	Win	Loss	Save	TV	Attendance	Overall record	SBC record
May 1	at South Alabama		Jaguar Field • Mobile, AL	**L** 0–4	Lackie (13-6)	**Belogorska** (5-13)	None	ESPN+	302	11–32	4–17
May 5	Georgia State		Eagle Field at GS Softball Complex • Statesboro, GA	**W** 3–2	**Belogorska** (6-13)	Buck (7-7)	None	ESPN+	203	12–32	5–17
May 6	Georgia State		Eagle Field at GS Softball Complex • Statesboro, GA	**W** 8–3	**Waldrep** (6-13)	Mooney (2-6)	None	ESPN+	219	13–32	6–17
May 7	Georgia State		Eagle Field at GS Softball Complex • Statesboro, GA	**L** 3–4	Adams (5-12)	**Belogorska** (6-14)	None	ESPN+	315	13–33	6–18

Post-Season (0–1)

SBC tournament (0–1)
Date	Opponent	(Seed)/Rank	Site/stadium	Score	Win	Loss	Save	TV	Attendance	Overall record	Tournament record
May 10	vs. (7) Georgia State	(10)	Jaguar Field • Mobile, AL	**L** 1–9^{6}	Buck (8-7)	**Waldrep** (6-14)	None	ESPN+	46	13–34	0–1

Schedule source:

*Rankings are based on the team's current ranking in the NFCA/USA Softball poll.
