= 2022 Coastal Carolina Chanticleers softball team =

University sport team

2022 Coastal Carolina Chanticleers softball
- Conference: Sun Belt Conference
- Record: 25–29 (7–17 SBC)
- Head coach: Kelley Green (13th season)
- Assistant coaches: Danielle Penner; Amanda Daneker
- Home stadium: St. John Stadium – Charles Wade-John Lott Field

2022 Sun Belt Conference softball standings
	Conf.				Overall
Team	W		L	PCT	W		L	PCT
Louisiana ‍†‍‡‍^{y}	23	–	4	.852	47	–	13	.783
South Alabama ‍‍‍	16	–	6	.727	26	–	21	.553
Texas State ‍‍‍	19	–	8	.704	39	–	19	.672
Troy ‍‍‍	15	–	12	.556	32	–	20	.615
UT Arlington ‍‍‍	12	–	15	.444	22	–	28	.440
Appalachian State ‍‍‍	10	–	15	.400	29	–	26	.527
Georgia State ‍‍‍	9	–	15	.375	21	–	34	.382
Louisiana–Monroe ‍‍‍	10	–	17	.370	27	–	27	.500
Coastal Carolina ‍‍‍	7	–	17	.292	25	–	29	.463
Georgia Southern ‍‍‍	6	–	18	.250	13	–	34	.277
† – Conference champion ‡ – Tournament champion y – Invited to the NCAA tournament As of June 5, 2022; Rankings from NFCA/USA Today

The 2022 Coastal Carolina Chanticleers softball team represented Coastal Carolina University during the 2022 NCAA Division I softball season. The Chanticleers played their home games at St. John Stadium – Charles Wade-John Lott Field. The Chanticleers were led by thirteenth-year head coach Kelley Green and were members of the Sun Belt Conference.

== Preseason ==
=== Sun Belt Conference Coaches Poll ===
The Sun Belt Conference Coaches Poll was released on January 31, 2022. Coastal Carolina was picked to finish seventh in the conference with 37 votes.

Coaches poll
Predicted finish	Team	Votes (1st place)
1	Louisiana	97 (7)
2	Texas State	87 (2)
3	Troy	82 (1)
4	South Alabama	74
5	UT Arlington	49
6	Appalachian State	46
7	Coastal Carolina	37
8	Georgia Southern	32
9	Louisiana–Monroe	27
10	Georgia State	19

=== Preseason All-Sun Belt team ===
- Olivia Lackie (USA, Pitcher)
- Leanna Johnson (TROY, Pitcher)
- Kandra Lamb (LA, Pitcher)
- Jessica Mullins (TXST, Pitcher)
- Kamdyn Kvistad (USA, Catcher)
- Sophie Piskos (LA, Catcher)
- Faith Shirley (GASO, 1st Base)
- Kelly Horne (TROY, 2nd Base)
- Daisy Hess (GSU, Shortstop)
- Sara Vanderford (TXST, 3rd Base)
- Iyanla De Jesus (CCU, Designated Player)
- Raina O'Neal (LA, Outfielder)
- Mackenzie Brasher (USA, Outfielder)
- Emily Brown (GSU, Outfielder)
- Jade Sinness (TROY, Outfielder)

=== National Softball Signing Day ===
Player	Position	Hometown	Previous Team
Ava Hampton	Utility	New Hartford, Connecticut	Northwestern HS
Annelisa Winebarger	Infielder/Catcher	Jacksonville, Florida	Yulee HS
Tori Miller	Pitcher	Harrah, Oklahoma	Harrah HS
Delaney Keith	Infielder/Utility	Nampa, Idaho	Skyview HS
Livi Payne	Catcher/Infielder	Milton, Georgia	Cambridge HS

== Personnel ==
2022 Coastal Carolina Chanticleers softball team
Players
Coaches

#	Pos.	Name	Bats/throws	Height	Year	Home town
0	RHP	Maddie Redman (redshirt)	R/R	6 ft 0 in (1.83 m)	So	Lake Winnebago, Missouri
1	C	Maddy Jennings	R/R	5 ft 5 in (1.65 m)	Fr	Belton, South Carolina
2	RHP	Mady Volpe	R/R	5 ft 7 in (1.7 m)	Fr	Lansdale, Pennsylvania
5	INF	Makiya Thomas	L/R	5 ft 3 in (1.6 m)	Sr	Tacoma, Washington
6	LHP	Nicolette Picone	R/L	5 ft 5 in (1.65 m)	Fr	Bethpage, New York
11	OF	Kendall Bowman	L/R	5 ft 8 in (1.73 m)	Fr	Winston-Salem, North Carolina
12	RHP	Kennedy Ellis	R/R	5 ft 6 in (1.68 m)	Fr	Aynor, South Carolina
15	OF	Payton Ebersole	L/R	5 ft 3 in (1.6 m)	So	Dillsburg, Pennsylvania
17	RHP	Raelee Brabham	R/R	5 ft 9 in (1.75 m)	Jr	Moncks Corner, South Carolina
18	INF	Jay Wrightsman	R/R	5 ft 4 in (1.63 m)	Fr	Myrtle Beach, South Carolina
20	OF	Madison Hudson	R/R	5 ft 3 in (1.6 m)	So	Lithia, Florida
21	INF	Abby Jankay	R/R	5 ft 8 in (1.73 m)	Fr	Coeur d'Alene, Idaho
23	INF	Da'Vidria Robinson	L/R	5 ft 4 in (1.63 m)	Jr	Greenwood, South Carolina
24	INF	Abbey Montoya	R/R	5 ft 4 in (1.63 m)	Sr	Castle Rock, Colorado
34	RHP	Iyanla De Jesus	R/R	5 ft 7 in (1.7 m)	Jr	Mill Creek, Washington
42	INF	Keirstin Roose	R/R	5 ft 4 in (1.63 m)	Fr	Wolcottville, Indiana
67	C	Shae Schreckengost	R/R	5 ft 9 in (1.75 m)	Sr	Pineville, Louisiana
68	INF	Riley Zana	R/R	5 ft 8 in (1.73 m)	So	Elyria, Ohio
99	RHP	Kaitlin Beasley-Polko	R/R	5 ft 7 in (1.7 m)	Sr	Leonardtown, Maryland

Head coach

Kelley Green (California–Pennsylvania)

Assistant coach(es)

Danielle Penner (Barry)
Amanda Daneker (Coastal Carolina)
Kassidy Smith (Coastal Carolina)

Legend

- (C) Team captain
- (S) Suspended
- (I) Ineligible
- Injured
- Current redshirt

Roster
Last update: 18 June 2022

== Schedule and results ==
Legend
	Coastal Carolina win
	Coastal Carolina loss
	Postponement/Cancellation/Suspensions
**Bold**	Coastal Carolina team member

2022 Coastal Carolina Chanticleers softball game log
Regular season (21–27)

February (7–6)
Date	Opponent	Rank	Site/stadium	Score	Win	Loss	Save	TV	Attendance	Overall record	SBC record
Kickin' Chicken Classic
Feb. 11	Purdue		St. John Stadium – Charles Wade-John Lott Field • Conway, SC	**L** 5–7	Klochack (1-0)	**De Jesus** (0-1)	Echazarreta (1)		225	0–1	
Feb. 11	Georgetown		St. John Stadium – Charles Wade-John Lott Field • Conway, SC	**W** 9–4	**Volpe** (1-0)	Julia (0-1)	**Beasley-Polko** (1)		126	1–1	
Feb. 12	Georgetown		St. John Stadium – Charles Wade-John Lott Field • Conway, SC	**W** 13–9	**Picone** (1-0)	Avery (0-1)	None		410	2–1	
Feb. 12	Purdue		St. John Stadium – Charles Wade-John Lott Field • Conway, SC	**L** 4–9	Wimpee (1-0)	**Picone** (1-1)	None		239	2–2	
Feb. 13	East Carolina		St. John Stadium – Charles Wade-John Lott Field • Conway, SC	**W** 10–4	**Picone** (2-1)	Bullis (1-1)	**Volpe** (1)		215	3–2	
Battle at the Beach
Feb. 18	Marshall		St. John Stadium – Charles Wade-John Lott Field • Conway, SC	**W** 4–3	**Beasley-Polko** (1-0)	Nester (3-1)	None		253	4–2	
Feb. 18	Fordham		St. John Stadium – Charles Wade-John Lott Field • Conway, SC	**W** 4–0	**Beasley-Polko** (2-0)	McGrath (2-1)	None		273	5—2	
Feb. 19	Marshall		St. John Stadium – Charles Wade-John Lott Field • Conway, SC	**L** 7–9	Joyce (1-2)	**Picone** (2-2)	Nester (1)		310	5–3	
Feb. 19	Fordham		St. John Stadium – Charles Wade-John Lott Field • Conway, SC	**L** 0–6	Miller (1-2)	**Volpe** (1-1)	None		320	5–4	
Feb. 20	South Carolina		St. John Stadium – Charles Wade-John Lott Field • Conway, SC	**L** 2–6	Kelsey (2-0)	**Beasley-Polko** (2-1)	None		632	5–5	
Chanticleer Showdown
Feb. 24	Monmouth		St. John Stadium – Charles Wade-John Lott Field • Conway, SC	**W** 12–2^{5}	**Beasley-Polko** (3-1)	Kerwood (1-2)	None		131	6–5	
Feb. 25	Central Michigan		St. John Stadium – Charles Wade-John Lott Field • Conway, SC	**W** 9–3	**Picone** (3-2)	Howe (0-1)	None		281	7–5	
Feb. 26	Maryland		St. John Stadium – Charles Wade-John Lott Field • Conway, SC	**L** 2–5	Schlotterbeck (3-4)	**Beasley-Polko** (3-2)	None		227	7–6	
Feb. 27	North Carolina A&T		St. John Stadium – Charles Wade-John Lott Field • Conway, SC	Game cancelled							

March (7–11)
Date	Opponent	Rank	Site/stadium	Score	Win	Loss	Save	TV	Attendance	Overall record	SBC record
Bubly Invitational
Mar. 4	vs. Tennessee State		Katie Seashole Pressly Softball Stadium • Gainesville, FL	**W** 3–2^{8}	**Beasley-Polko** (4-2)	Loveless (2-5)	None			8–6	
Mar. 4	at No. 3 Florida		Katie Seashole Pressly Softball Stadium • Gainesville, FL	**L** 1–8	Delbrey (6-1)	**Picone** (3-3)	None		1,330	8–7	
Mar. 5	vs. Tennessee State		Katie Seashole Pressly Softball Stadium • Gainesville, FL	**W** 3–1	**Picone** (4-3)	King (1-4)	**Volpe** (2)			9–7	
Mar. 5	vs. Georgia State		Katie Seashole Pressly Softball Stadium • Gainesville, FL	**L** 2–3	Buck (4-3)	**Beasley-Polko** (4-3)	None		1,301	9–8	
Mar. 6	at No. 3 Florida		Katie Seashole Pressly Softball Stadium • Gainesville, FL	**L** 1–17^{5}	Hightower (5-0)	**Redman** (0-1)	None			9–9	
Mar. 9	at Campbell		Amanda Littlejohn Stadium • Buies Creek, NC	Game postponed							
Mar. 11	Troy		St. John Stadium – Charles Wade-John Lott Field • Conway, SC	**L** 2–5	Johnson (9-2)	**Beasley-Polko** (4-4)	None	ESPN+	118	9–10	0–1
Mar. 12	Troy		St. John Stadium – Charles Wade-John Lott Field • Conway, SC	Game cancelled							
Mar. 13	Troy		St. John Stadium – Charles Wade-John Lott Field • Conway, SC	**L** 1–3	Baker (5-1)	**Picone** (4-3)	None	ESPN+	121	9–11	0–2
Mar. 13	Troy		St. John Stadium – Charles Wade-John Lott Field • Conway, SC	**W** 4–3	**Beasley-Polko** (5-4)	Baker (5-2)	None	ESPN+	131	10–11	1–2
Mar. 15	Charleston Southern		St. John Stadium – Charles Wade-John Lott Field • Conway, SC	**W** 5–4^{8}	**Beasley-Polko** (6-4)	Eaton (2-5)	None	ESPN+	104	11–11	
Mar. 15	Charleston Southern		St. John Stadium – Charles Wade-John Lott Field • Conway, SC	**W** 10–1^{5}	**Picone** (5-4)	Eaton (2-6)	None	ESPN+	176	12–11	
Mar. 18	at UT Arlington		Allan Saxe Field • Arlington, TX	**L** 5–11	Bumpurs (3-3)	**Volpe** (1-2)	None		289	12–12	1–3
Mar. 19	at UT Arlington		Allan Saxe Field • Arlington, TX	**L** 2–5	Bumpurs (4-3)	**Picone** (5-5)	Adams (2)		159	12–13	1–4
Mar. 20	at UT Arlington		Allan Saxe Field • Arlington, TX	**L** 2–5	Adams (7-7)	**De Jesus** (0-2)	None		244	12–14	1–5
Mar. 23	College of Charleston		St. John Stadium – Charles Wade-John Lott Field • Conway, SC	Game postponed							
Mar. 23	College of Charleston		St. John Stadium – Charles Wade-John Lott Field • Conway, SC	Game postponed							
Mar. 25	Texas State		St. John Stadium – Charles Wade-John Lott Field • Conway, SC	**L** 2–8	Mullins (10-9)	**Beasley-Polko** (6-5)	None	ESPN+	223	12–15	1–6
Mar. 26	Texas State		St. John Stadium – Charles Wade-John Lott Field • Conway, SC	**L** 0–9^{6}	Mullins (11-9)	**Picone** (5-6)	None	ESPN+	307	12–16	1–7
Mar. 27	Texas State		St. John Stadium – Charles Wade-John Lott Field • Conway, SC	**L** 7–9	Mullins (12-9)	**Picone** (5-7)	None	ESPN+	315	12–17	1–8
Mar. 29	at Winthrop		Terry Field • Rock Hill, SC	**W** 2–0	**Beasley-Polko** (7-5)	Basinger (4-8)	None		61	13–17	
Mar. 29	at Winthrop		Terry Field • Rock Hill, SC	**W** 5–3^{9}	**Beasley-Polko** (8-5)	Roy (3-7)	None		61	14–17	

April (4–10)
Date	Opponent	Rank	Site/stadium	Score	Win	Loss	Save	TV	Attendance	Overall record	SBC record
Apr. 1	at South Alabama		Jaguar Field • Mobile, AL	**L** 0–4	Lackie (7-4)	**Beasley-Polko** (8-6)	None		369	14–18	1–9
Apr. 2	at South Alabama		Jaguar Field • Mobile, AL	**L** 2–3	Hardy (6-7)	**Picone** (5-7)	None		347	14–19	1–10
Apr. 3	at South Alabama		Jaguar Field • Mobile, AL	**L** 0–3	Lackie (8-4)	**Volpe** (0-1)	None			14–20	1–11
Apr. 6	at Campbell		Amanda Littlejohn Stadium • Buies Creek, NC	**W** 4–1	**De Jesus** (1-2)	Barefoot (9-4)	**Beasley-Polko** (2)		143	15–20	
Apr. 8	at Georgia Southern		Eagle Field at GS Softball Complex • Statesboro, GA	Game postponed							
Apr. 9	at Georgia Southern		Eagle Field at GS Softball Complex • Statesboro, GA	Game postponed							
Apr. 10	at Georgia Southern		Eagle Field at GS Softball Complex • Statesboro, GA	Game postponed							
Apr. 14	Louisiana–Monroe		St. John Stadium – Charles Wade-John Lott Field • Conway, SC	**L** 3–11^{6}	Kackley (7-5)	**Volpe** (1-3)	None	ESPN+	369	15–21	1–12
Apr. 15	Louisiana–Monroe		St. John Stadium – Charles Wade-John Lott Field • Conway, SC	**L** 0–2	Abrams (7-3)	**Beasley-Polko** (8-7)	None	ESPN+	207	15–22	1–13
Apr. 15	Louisiana–Monroe		St. John Stadium – Charles Wade-John Lott Field • Conway, SC	**L** 3–6	Kackley (8-5)	**Volpe** (1-4)	None	ESPN+	201	15–23	1–14
Apr. 22	Georgia State		St. John Stadium – Charles Wade-John Lott Field • Conway, SC	**W** 3–2	**Beasley-Polko** (9-7)	Adams (4-10)	None	ESPN+	216	16–23	2–14
Apr. 23	Georgia State		St. John Stadium – Charles Wade-John Lott Field • Conway, SC	**W** 12–10	**Volpe** (2-4)	Hodnett (3-4)	None	ESPN+	317	17–23	3–14
Apr. 24	Georgia State		St. John Stadium – Charles Wade-John Lott Field • Conway, SC	**W** 8–2	**Beasley-Polko** (10-7)	Adams (4-11)	None	ESPN+	131	18–23	4–14
Apr. 27	at Charlotte		Sue M. Daughtridge Stadium • Charlotte, NC	**L** 4–5	Wright (7-7)	**Redman** (0-1)	None		135	18–24	
Apr. 29	at Louisiana		Yvette Girouard Field at Lamson Park • Lafayette, LA	**L** 0–6	Lamb (9-4)	**Beasley-Polko** (10-8)	None		1,655	18–25	4–15
Apr. 30	at Louisiana		Yvette Girouard Field at Lamson Park • Lafayette, LA	**L** 3–6	Schorman (12-4)	**Volpe** (2-5)	None			18–26	4–16
Apr. 30	at Louisiana		Yvette Girouard Field at Lamson Park • Lafayette, LA	**L** 3–7	Landry (16-3)	**Beasley-Polko** (10-9)	None		1,832	18–27	4–17

May (3–0)
Date	Opponent	Rank	Site/stadium	Score	Win	Loss	Save	TV	Attendance	Overall record	SBC record
May 5	Appalachian State		St. John Stadium – Charles Wade-John Lott Field • Conway, SC	**W** 2–0	**Beasley-Polko** (11-9)	Neas (8-4)	None	ESPN+	163	19–27	5–17
May 5	Appalachian State		St. John Stadium – Charles Wade-John Lott Field • Conway, SC	**W** 6–5	**Brabham** (1-0)	Buckner (13-10)	None	ESPN+	163	20–27	6–17
May 6	Appalachian State		St. John Stadium – Charles Wade-John Lott Field • Conway, SC	**W** 4–1	**Beasley-Polko** (12-9)	Neas (8-5)	None	ESPN+	168	21–27	7–17

Post-Season (4–2)

SBC tournament (4–2)
Date	Opponent	(Seed)/Rank	Site/stadium	Score	Win	Loss	Save	TV	Attendance	Overall record	Tournament record
May 10	vs. (8) Louisiana–Monroe	(9)	Jaguar Field • Mobile, AL	**W** 5–0	**Beasley-Polko** (13-9)	Abrams (7-10)	None	ESPN+	55	22–27	1–0
May 11	vs. (1)/No. 25 Louisiana	(9)	Jaguar Field • Mobile, AL	**L** 2–4	Schorman (14-4)	**Beasley-Polko** (13-10)	None	ESPN+	78	22–28	1–1
May 12	vs. (6) Appalachian State	(9)	Jaguar Field • Mobile, AL	**W** 3–2	**Beasley-Polko** (14-10)	Neas (8-6)	None	ESPN+	67	23–28	2–1
May 13	vs. (2) South Alabama	(9)	Jaguar Field • Mobile, AL	**W** 3–0	**Volpe** (3-5)	Hardy (8-10)	None	ESPN+	134	24–28	3–1
May 13	vs. (4) Troy	(9)	Jaguar Field • Mobile, AL	**W** 3–2	**Beasley-Polko** (15-10)	Baker (9-6)	None	ESPN+	81	25–28	4–1
May 14	vs. (3) Texas State	(9)	Jaguar Field • Mobile, AL	**L** 1–3	Pierce (8-4)	**Beasley-Polko** (15-11)	None	ESPN+	115	25–29	4–2

Schedule source:

*Rankings are based on the team's current ranking in the NFCA/USA Softball poll.
