= 2022 Appalachian State Mountaineers softball team =

American college softball season

2022 Appalachian State Mountaineers softball
- Conference: Sun Belt Conference
- Record: 29–26 (10–15 SBC)
- Head coach: Shelly Hoerner (5th season)
- Assistant coaches: Shane Showalter; Natalie Ruechel
- Home stadium: Sywassink/Lloyd Family Stadium

2022 Sun Belt Conference softball standings
	Conf.				Overall
Team	W		L	PCT	W		L	PCT
Louisiana ‍†‍‡‍^{y}	23	–	4	.852	47	–	13	.783
South Alabama ‍‍‍	16	–	6	.727	26	–	21	.553
Texas State ‍‍‍	19	–	8	.704	39	–	19	.672
Troy ‍‍‍	15	–	12	.556	32	–	20	.615
UT Arlington ‍‍‍	12	–	15	.444	22	–	28	.440
Appalachian State ‍‍‍	10	–	15	.400	29	–	26	.527
Georgia State ‍‍‍	9	–	15	.375	21	–	34	.382
Louisiana–Monroe ‍‍‍	10	–	17	.370	27	–	27	.500
Coastal Carolina ‍‍‍	7	–	17	.292	25	–	29	.463
Georgia Southern ‍‍‍	6	–	18	.250	13	–	34	.277
† – Conference champion ‡ – Tournament champion y – Invited to the NCAA tournament As of June 5, 2022; Rankings from NFCA/USA Today

The 2022 Appalachian State Mountaineers softball team represented Appalachian State University during the 2022 NCAA Division I softball season. The Mountaineers played their home games at Sywassink/Lloyd Family Stadium. The Mountaineers were led by fifth-year head coach Shelly Hoerner and were members of the Sun Belt Conference.

== Preseason ==
=== Sun Belt Conference Coaches Poll ===
The Sun Belt Conference Coaches Poll was released on January 31, 2022. Appalachian State was picked to finish sixth in the conference with 46 votes.

Coaches poll
Predicted finish	Team	Votes (1st place)
1	Louisiana	97 (7)
2	Texas State	87 (2)
3	Troy	82 (1)
4	South Alabama	74
5	UT Arlington	49
6	Appalachian State	46
7	Coastal Carolina	37
8	Georgia Southern	32
9	Louisiana–Monroe	27
10	Georgia State	19

=== Preseason All-Sun Belt team ===
No Mountaineers were chosen to the team.

=== National Softball Signing Day ===
Player	Position	Hometown	Previous Team
Alannah Hopkins	Pitcher	Sylva, North Carolina	Smoky Mountain HS
Ambry Lucas	Infielder	Senoia, Georgia	Trinity Christian
Kaylee Kardash	Infielder	Fishers, Indiana	Fishers HS
Emma Wyman	Pitcher	Ocala, Florida	Trinity Catholic HS
Riley Becker	Catcher	Matthews, North Carolina	Weddington HS

== Personnel ==
2022 Appalachian State Mountaineers softball team
Players
Coaches

#	Pos.	Name	Bats/throws	Height	Year	Home town
3	C	Kathleen Barton	R/R	5 ft 7 in (1.7 m)	Fr	Helotes, Texas
4	OF	Emily Parrott	R/R	5 ft 4 in (1.63 m)	Jr	Palatine, Illinois
5	INF	Addie Wray	L/R	5 ft 7 in (1.7 m)	Fr	Claremont, North Carolina
7	U	Katelynn Crowe	R/R	5 ft 8 in (1.73 m)	Fr	Denver, North Carolina
8	C	Hailey Webb	R/R	5 ft 4 in (1.63 m)	Fr	Antioch, Illinois
10	INF	Kennedy Upshire	R/R	5 ft 4 in (1.63 m)	Fr	Rancho Murieta, California
11	RHP	Delani Buckner	R/R	5 ft 7 in (1.7 m)	So	Elkview, West Virginia
12	OF	Kayt Houston	L/R	5 ft 7 in (1.7 m)	So	Rock Hill, South Carolina
13	RHP	Sejal Neas	R/R	6 ft 0 in (1.83 m)	Fr	Johnson City, Tennessee
14	U	Addison Jones	L/R	5 ft 6 in (1.68 m)	Jr	Marshville, North Carolina
15	OF	Claire Carson	L/R	5 ft 5 in (1.65 m)	So	Senoia, Georgia
16	OF	Mary Pierce Barnes	L/R	5 ft 6 in (1.68 m)	Sr	Waxhaw, North Carolina
18	C	Taylor Thorp (redshirt)	R/R	5 ft 9 in (1.75 m)	Jr	Tallahassee, Florida
19	INF	McKenzie McCullen	L/L	5 ft 10 in (1.78 m)	Jr	Durham, North Carolina
20	OF	Abby Cunningham	R/R	5 ft 6 in (1.68 m)	So	Greenfield, Wisconsin
23	INF	Emma Jones	L/R	5 ft 6 in (1.68 m)	So	Anniston, Alabama
24	LHP	Kaylie Northrop	L/L	5 ft 8 in (1.73 m)	So	Richland, Washington
25	C	Kylie LaRousa	R/R	6 ft 1 in (1.85 m)	Fr	Harrisburg, North Carolina
27	C	Baylee Morton	R/R	5 ft 10 in (1.78 m)	Sr	Monroe, North Carolina
31	U	Sidney Martin	L/R	5 ft 1 in (1.55 m)	So	Graham, North Carolina

Head coach

Shelly Hoerner (Barry)

Assistant coach(es)

Shane Showalter (Adams State)
Natalie Ruechel (Averett)

Legend

- (C) Team captain
- (S) Suspended
- (I) Ineligible
- Injured
- Current redshirt

Roster
Last update: 11 June 2022

== Schedule and results ==
Legend
	Appalachian State win
	Appalachian State loss
	Postponement/Cancellation/Suspensions
**Bold**	Appalachian State team member

2022 Appalachian State Mountaineers softball game log
Regular season (29–24)

February (7–5)
Date	Opponent	Rank	Site/stadium	Score	Win	Loss	Save	TV	Attendance	Overall record	SBC record
Elon Tournament
Feb. 12	vs. St. Francis		Hunt Softball Complex • Elon, NC	**L** 1–3	Marsden (1-0)	**Northrop** (0-1)	None	FloSports	117	0–1	
Feb. 12	vs. IUPUI		Hunt Softball Complex • Elon, NC	**W** 5–4	**Neas** (1-0)	Bryant (0-2)	None	FloSports	84	1–1	
Feb. 13	vs. St. Francis		Hunt Softball Complex • Elon, NC	**W** 9–7	**Buckner** (1-0)	Vesco (1-2)	**Northrop** (1)	FloSports	55	2–1	
Feb. 13	at Elon		Hunt Softball Complex • Elon, NC	Game cancelled							
Presbyterian Tournament
Feb. 19	vs. Detroit Mercy		PC Softball Complex • Clinton, SC	**W** 5–1	**Northrop** (1-1)	Warrington (0-1)	None		75	3–1	
Feb. 19	vs. North Carolina Central		PC Softball Complex • Clinton, SC	**W** 13–0^{5}	**Buckner** (2-0)	Reynolds (0-2)	None		75	4–1	
Feb. 20	vs. Detroit Mercy		PC Softball Complex • Clinton, SC	**W** 6–0	**Nichols** (1-0)	Murphy (0-2)	None		22	5–1	
Feb. 20	at Presbyterian		PC Softball Complex • Clinton, SC	**L** 0–8^{5}	Greene (2-2)	**Northrop** (1-2)	None		87	5–2	
College of Charleston Tournament
Feb. 25	vs. Western Carolina		Patriots Point Athletics Complex • Mount Pleasant, SC	**W** 3–0	**Buckner** (3-0)	Rice (3-1)	None		125	6–2	
Feb. 25	at College of Charleston		Patriots Point Athletics Complex • Mount Pleasant, SC	**L** 4–5	Siegling (1-1)	**Neas** (1-1)	None		160	6–3	
Feb. 26	vs. UConn		Patriots Point Athletics Complex • Mount Pleasant, SC	**L** 1–2	O'Neil (3-2)	**Nichols** (1-1)	None		75	6–4	
Feb. 26	at College of Charleston		Patriots Point Athletics Complex • Mount Pleasant, SC	**W** 6–1	**Buckner** (4-0)	Lemire (0-5)	None		225	7–4	
Feb. 27	vs. UConn		Patriots Point Athletics Complex • Mount Pleasant, SC	**L** 6–7^{9}	Sokolsky (3-2)	**Buckner** (4-1)	None		200	7–5	

March (10–8)
Date	Opponent	Rank	Site/stadium	Score	Win	Loss	Save	TV	Attendance	Overall record	SBC record
Mar. 1	at USC Upstate		Cyrill Softball Stadium • Spartanburg, SC	**L** 6–9	Houge (8-1)	**Nichols** (1-2)	None		114	7–6	
UGA Tournament
Mar. 4	vs. Ohio		Jack Turner Stadium • Athens, GA	**W** 5–4	**Neas** (2-1)	Kohl (2-4)	**Nichols** (1)		87	8–6	
Mar. 4	vs. UMass		Jack Turner Stadium • Athens, GA	**W** 9–1	**Northrop** (2-2)	Bradley (1-2)	None		156	9–6	
Mar. 5	vs. UMass		Jack Turner Stadium • Athens, GA	**W** 9–2	**Buckner** (5-1)	DiPasquale (2-3)	None		165	10–6	
Mar. 5	vs. Ohio		Jack Turner Stadium • Athens, GA	**W** 7–0	**Nichols** (2-2)	Kohl (2-6)	None		167	11–6	
Mar. 6	at No. 16 Georgia		Jack Turner Stadium • Athens, GA	**L** 2–10^{5}	Macy (5-0)	**Northrop** (2-3)	None		1,014	11–7	
Mar. 9	Boston College		Sywassink/Lloyd Family Stadium • Boone, NC	Game cancelled							
Mar. 11	at Texas State		Bobcat Softball Stadium • San Marcos, TX	**L** 0–5	Mullins (7-5)	**Buckner** (5-2)	None		483	11–8	0–1
Mar. 12	at Texas State		Bobcat Softball Stadium • San Marcos, TX	**W** 3–2	**Nichols** (3-2)	Glende (2-2)	None		483	12–8	1–1
Mar. 13	at Texas State		Bobcat Softball Stadium • San Marcos, TX	**W** 4–1	**Northrop** (3-3)	Mullins (7-6)	None		408	13–8	2–1
Mar. 16	East Tennessee State		Sywassink/Lloyd Family Stadium • Boone, NC	Game postponed							
Mar. 16	East Tennessee State		Sywassink/Lloyd Family Stadium • Boone, NC	Game postponed							
Mar. 19	at Georgia State		Robert E. Heck Softball Complex • Panthersville, GA	**W** 11–0^{5}	**Buckner** (6-2)	Adams (2-5)	None		81	14–8	3–1
Mar. 19	at Georgia State		Robert E. Heck Softball Complex • Panthersville, GA	**L** 2–6	Mooney (2-4)	**Nichols** (3-3)	None		85	14–9	3–2
Mar. 20	at Georgia State		Robert E. Heck Softball Complex • Panthersville, GA	**L** 5–8	Hodnett (2-3)	**Northrop** (3-4)	Buck (1)		87	14–10	3–3
Mar. 22	Western Carolina		Sywassink/Lloyd Family Stadium • Boone, NC	**W** 9–2	**Nichols** (4-3)	Juett (2-4)	None		187	15–10	
Mar. 22	Western Carolina		Sywassink/Lloyd Family Stadium • Boone, NC	**L** 2–5^{8}	Rice (6-3)	**Buckner** (6-3)	None		187	15–11	
Mar. 25	at Louisiana–Monroe		Geo-Surfaces Field at the ULM Softball Complex • Monroe, LA	**W** 6–3	**Buckner** (7-3)	Chavarria (2-4)	**Neas** (1)		405	16–11	4–3
Mar. 26	at Louisiana–Monroe		Geo-Surfaces Field at the ULM Softball Complex • Monroe, LA	**W** 7–6	**Neas** (3-1)	Kackley (5-3)	None		410	17–11	5–3
Mar. 27	at Louisiana–Monroe		Geo-Surfaces Field at the ULM Softball Complex • Monroe, LA	**L** 1–2	Chavarria (3-4)	**Northrop** (3-5)	None		398	17–12	5–4
Mar. 30	at North Carolina		Williams Field at Anderson Stadium • Chapel Hill, NC	**L** 4–8	George (10-2)	**Buckner** (7-4)	None		144	17–13	

April (12–7)
Date	Opponent	Rank	Site/stadium	Score	Win	Loss	Save	TV	Attendance	Overall record	SBC record
Apr. 1	Georgia Southern		Sywassink/Lloyd Family Stadium • Boone, NC	**W** 2–1	**Neas** (4-1)	Belogorska (3-9)	None		252	18–13	6–4
Apr. 2	Georgia Southern		Sywassink/Lloyd Family Stadium • Boone, NC	**W** 7–1	**Buckner** (8-4)	Waldrep (4-6)	None		277	19–13	7–4
Apr. 3	Georgia Southern		Sywassink/Lloyd Family Stadium • Boone, NC	**L** 8–11	Waldrep (5-6)	**Buckner** (8-5)	None		220	19–14	7–5
Apr. 6	East Tennessee State		Sywassink/Lloyd Family Stadium • Boone, NC	**W** 8–1	**Buckner** (9-5)	Farr (3-8)	None		106	20–14	
Apr. 6	East Tennessee State		Sywassink/Lloyd Family Stadium • Boone, NC	**W** 8–0	**Neas** (5-1)	Arnott (0-10)	None		78	21–14	
Apr. 8	South Alabama		Sywassink/Lloyd Family Stadium • Boone, NC	Game postponed due to inclement weather							
Apr. 9	South Alabama		Sywassink/Lloyd Family Stadium • Boone, NC	Game cancelled							
Apr. 10	South Alabama		Sywassink/Lloyd Family Stadium • Boone, NC	**L** 6–10	Lackie (8-4)	**Buckner** (9-6)	None		125	21–15	7–6
Apr. 12	North Carolina Central		Sywassink/Lloyd Family Stadium • Boone, NC	**W** 18–1	**Neas** (6-1)	Davis (2-6)	None	ESPN+	65	22–15	
Apr. 12	North Carolina Central		Sywassink/Lloyd Family Stadium • Boone, NC	**W** 11–9	**Buckner** (10-6)	Reynolds (1-4)	None	ESPN+	44	23–15	
Apr. 14	at Troy		Troy Softball Complex • Troy, AL	**L** 0–2	Johnson (15-7)	**Buckner** (10-7)	None		107	23–16	7–7
Apr. 15	at Troy		Troy Softball Complex • Troy, AL	**L** 2–6	Johnson (16-7)	**Neas** (6-2)	None		67	23–17	7–8
Apr. 15	at Troy		Troy Softball Complex • Troy, AL	**L** 3–7	Baker (7-4)	**Buckner** (10-8)	None		103	23–18	7–9
Apr. 19	at East Tennessee State		Betty Basler Field • Johnson City, TN	**W** 8–0^{6}	**Buckner** (11-8)	Farr (3-13)	None		100	24–18	
Apr. 19	at East Tennessee State		Betty Basler Field • Johnson City, TN	**W** 8–0^{5}	**Neas** (7-2)	Arnott (0-13)	None		115	25–18	
Apr. 22	Louisiana		Sywassink/Lloyd Family Stadium • Boone, NC	**W** 4–1	**Buckner** (11-8)	Landry (14-3)	None	ESPN+	205	26–18	8–9
Apr. 23	Louisiana		Sywassink/Lloyd Family Stadium • Boone, NC	**L** 2–8	Schorman (10-4)	**Neas** (6-3)	None	ESPN+	311	26–19	8–10
Apr. 24	Louisiana		Sywassink/Lloyd Family Stadium • Boone, NC	**L** 1–10	Landry (15-3)	**Nichols** (4-4)	None	ESPN+	229	26–20	8–11
Apr. 26	North Carolina A&T		Sywassink/Lloyd Family Stadium • Boone, NC	**W** 6–4	**Neas** (7-3)	Stinson (2-9)	None		99	27–20	
Apr. 29	UT Arlington		Sywassink/Lloyd Family Stadium • Boone, NC	**W** 7–6	**Northrop** (4-5)	Bumpurs (6-6)	**Buckner** (1)		219	28–20	9–11
Apr. 29	UT Arlington		Sywassink/Lloyd Family Stadium • Boone, NC	**W** 7–2	**Buckner** (12-8)	Adams (12-14)	None		188	29–20	10–11
Apr. 30	UT Arlington		Sywassink/Lloyd Family Stadium • Boone, NC	**L** 1–4	Max (4-1)	**Buckner** (11-9)	None		237	29–21	10–12

May (0–3)
Date	Opponent	Rank	Site/stadium	Score	Win	Loss	Save	TV	Attendance	Overall record	SBC record
May 5	at Coastal Carolina		St. John Stadium – Charles Wade-John Lott Field • Conway, SC	**L** 0–2	Beasley-Polko (11-9)	**Neas** (8-4)	None		163	29–22	10–13
May 5	at Coastal Carolina		St. John Stadium – Charles Wade-John Lott Field • Conway, SC	**L** 5–6	Brabham (1-0)	**Buckner** (13-10)	None		163	29–23	10–14
May 6	at Coastal Carolina		St. John Stadium – Charles Wade-John Lott Field • Conway, SC	**L** 1–4	Beasley-Polko (12-9)	**Neas** (8-5)	None		168	29–24	10–15

Post-Season (0–2)

SBC tournament (0–2)
Date	Opponent	(Seed)/Rank	Site/stadium	Score	Win	Loss	Save	TV	Attendance	Overall record	Tournament record
May 11	vs. (3) Texas State	(6)	Jaguar Field • Mobile, AL	**L** 0–2	Mullins (26-11)	**Buckner** (13-11)	None	ESPN+	103	29–25	0–1
May 12	vs. (9) Coastal Carolina	(6)	Jaguar Field • Mobile, AL	**L** 2–3	Beasley-Polko (14-10)	**Neas** (8-6)	None	ESPN+	67	29–26	0–2

Schedule source:

*Rankings are based on the team's current ranking in the NFCA/USA Softball poll.
