= 2022 Troy Trojans softball team =

Troy University softball team

2022 Troy Trojans softball
- Conference: Sun Belt Conference
- Record: 31–21 (15–12 SBC)
- Head coach: Beth Mullins (February–March) (8th season); Holly Ward & Taylor Smartt (March–May) (interim)
- Assistant coaches: Taylor Smartt; Holly Ward
- Home stadium: Troy Softball Complex

2022 Sun Belt Conference softball standings
	Conf.				Overall
Team	W		L	PCT	W		L	PCT
Louisiana ‍†‍‡‍^{y}	23	–	4	.852	47	–	13	.783
South Alabama ‍‍‍	16	–	6	.727	26	–	21	.553
Texas State ‍‍‍	19	–	8	.704	39	–	19	.672
Troy ‍‍‍	15	–	12	.556	32	–	20	.615
UT Arlington ‍‍‍	12	–	15	.444	22	–	28	.440
Appalachian State ‍‍‍	10	–	15	.400	29	–	26	.527
Georgia State ‍‍‍	9	–	15	.375	21	–	34	.382
Louisiana–Monroe ‍‍‍	10	–	17	.370	27	–	27	.500
Coastal Carolina ‍‍‍	7	–	17	.292	25	–	29	.463
Georgia Southern ‍‍‍	6	–	18	.250	13	–	34	.277
† – Conference champion ‡ – Tournament champion y – Invited to the NCAA tournament As of June 5, 2022; Rankings from NFCA/USA Today

The 2022 Troy Trojans softball team represented Troy University during the 2022 NCAA Division I softball season. The Trojans played their home games at Troy Softball Complex. The Trojans were led by eighth-year head coach Beth Mullins until she resigned due to health conditions on March 14, 2022. Assistant coaches Taylor Smartt and Holly Ward served as interim Co-Head Coaches for the remainder of the season. They were members of the Sun Belt Conference.

== Preseason ==
=== Sun Belt Conference Coaches Poll ===
The Sun Belt Conference Coaches Poll was released on January 31, 2022. Troy was picked to finish third in the conference with 82 votes and 1 first place vote.

Coaches poll
Predicted finish	Team	Votes (1st place)
1	Louisiana	97 (7)
2	Texas State	87 (2)
3	Troy	82 (1)
4	South Alabama	74
5	UT Arlington	49
6	Appalachian State	46
7	Coastal Carolina	37
8	Georgia Southern	32
9	Louisiana–Monroe	27
10	Georgia State	19

=== Preseason All-Sun Belt team ===
Preseason Pitcher of the Year Leanna Johnson (TROY, Pitcher)

Team

- Olivia Lackie (USA, Pitcher)
- Leanna Johnson (TROY, Pitcher)
- Kandra Lamb (LA, Pitcher)
- Jessica Mullins (TXST, Pitcher)
- Kamdyn Kvistad (USA, Catcher)
- Sophie Piskos (LA, Catcher)
- Faith Shirley (GASO, 1st Base)
- Kelly Horne (TROY, 2nd Base)
- Daisy Hess (GSU, Shortstop)
- Sara Vanderford (TXST, 3rd Base)
- Iyanla De Jesus (CCU, Designated Player)
- Raina O'Neal (LA, Outfielder)
- Mackenzie Brasher (USA, Outfielder)
- Emily Brown (GSU, Outfielder)
- Jade Sinness (TROY, Outfielder)

=== National Softball Signing Day ===
Player	Position	Hometown	Previous Team
Kayden Dunn	Infielder	Brantley, Alabama	Brantley HS
Olivia Cato	Pitcher	Palmetto, Georgia	Northgate HS

== Personnel ==
2022 Troy Trojans softball team
Players
Coaches

#	Pos.	Name	Bats/throws	Height	Year	Home town
1	OF	Tate Moseley	L/R	—	Sr	Birmingham, Alabama
2	OF	Anslee Finch	R/R	—	So	Geneva, Alabama
3	RHP	Libby Baker	R/R	—	So	Skipperville, Alabama
4	U	Blake Gibson	L/R	—	So	Dothan, Alabama
5	OF	Emma Grace Walker	L/R	—	Fr	Kennesaw, Georgia
6	INF	Kaylee Chapman	R/R	—	Sr	Springville, Alabama
8	OF	Taylor McKinney	R/R	—	Fr	Montgomery, Alabama
9	OF	Jade Sinness	L/L	—	So	Sebring, Florida
10	RHP	Leanna Johnson	R/R	—	Jr	Brantley, Alabama
11	INF	Audra Thompson	R/R	—	So	Kissimmee, Florida
12	C	Jill Robinson (redshirt)	R/R	—	Fr	Mobile, Alabama
13	INF	Aayanah Hughes	R/R	—	Fr	McDonough, Georgia
14	C	Candela Figueroa	R/R	—	Sr	Villaguay, Argentina
17	C	Katelynn De Leon	R/R	—	So	Pembroke Pines, Florida
18	INF	Adia Polk	L/R	—	Sr	Snellville, Georgia
21	RHP	Brianna Bailey	R/R	—	Jr	Wewahitchka, Florida
22	INF	Logan Calhoun	L/R	—	Sr	Dublin, Georgia
24	RHP	Brookelyn Cannon	R/R	—	Fr	Hoover, Alabama
25	OF	Katie Lively	L/R	—	Jr	Helena, Alabama
26	RHP	Haley Postell	R/R	—	Sr	Hueytown, Alabama
27	INF	Mia Jenkins	R/R	—	So	Monticello, Georgia
31	INF	Kelly Horne	R/R	—	Jr	Tallahassee, Florida
34	INF	Kennedi Gaton	R/R	—	So	Winter Springs, Florida

Head coach

Beth Mullins (UAB)

Assistant coach(es)

Taylor Smartt (Troy)
Holly Ward (Mississippi State)

Legend

- (C) Team captain
- (S) Suspended
- (I) Ineligible
- Injured
- Current redshirt

Roster
Last update: 8 June 2022

== Schedule and results ==
Legend
	Troy win
	Troy loss
	Postponement/Cancellation/Suspensions
**Bold**	Troy team member

2022 Troy Trojans softball game log
Regular season (29–19)

February (11–2)
Date	Opponent	Rank	Site/stadium	Score	Win	Loss	Save	TV	Attendance	Overall record	SBC record
Trojan Classic
Feb. 11	College of Charleston		Troy Softball Complex • Troy, AL	**L** 0–1	McCants (1-0)	**Bailey** (0-1)	None		343	0–1	
Feb. 11	Southern Illinois		Troy Softball Complex • Troy, AL	**W** 2–1	**Johnson** (1-0)	Eberle (0-1)	None		379	1–1	
Feb. 12	Southern Illinois		Troy Softball Complex • Troy, AL	**W** 4–2	**Johnson** (2-0)	Harness (1-1)	None		411	2–1	
Feb. 12	Purdue Fort Wayne		Troy Softball Complex • Troy, AL	**W** 9–1^{5}	**Baker** (1-0)	Eyre (0-2)	None		322	3–1	
Feb. 13	Purdue Fort Wayne		Troy Softball Complex • Troy, AL	**W** 16–5^{5}	**Baker** (2-0)	Quinlan (0-1)	None		267	4–1	
Feb. 16	at UAB		Mary Bowers Field • Birmingham, AL	**W** 6–3	**Johnson** (3-0)	Valbak (0-1)	None		337	5–1	
Troy Invitational
Feb. 18	Nicholls		Troy Softball Complex • Troy, AL	**W** 8–0^{5}	**Baker** (3-0)	Lehman (1-1)	None		217	6–1	
Feb. 18	Eastern Kentucky		Troy Softball Complex • Troy, AL	**W** 9–0^{5}	**Johnson** (4-0)	Todd (0-3)	None		221	7–1	
Feb. 19	Nicholls		Troy Softball Complex • Troy, AL	**W** 10–9	**Bailey** (1-1)	Turner (1-4)	**Johnson** (1)		497	8–1	
Feb. 19	Ole Miss		Troy Softball Complex • Troy, AL	**W** 4–3	**Johnson** (5-0)	Borgen (1-2)	None		517	9–1	
Feb. 20	Ole Miss		Troy Softball Complex • Troy, AL	**L** 7–8	Diederich (2-0)	**Johnson** (5-1)	Borgen (1)		237	9–2	
Carolina Classic
Feb. 25	vs. Miami (OH)		Carolina Softball Stadium at Beckham Field • Columbia, SC	**W** 5–1	**Johnson** (6-1)	Vierstra (0-3)	None		176	10–2	
Feb. 26	vs. Ohio State		Carolina Softball Stadium at Beckham Field • Columbia, SC	**W** 4–0	**Johnson** (7-1)	Handley (3-2)	None		236	11–2	
Feb. 27	vs. No. 7 Virginia Tech		Carolina Softball Stadium at Beckham Field • Columbia, SC	Game cancelled							
Feb. 27	at South Carolina		Carolina Softball Stadium at Beckham Field • Columbia, SC	Game cancelled							

March (9–7)
Date	Opponent	Rank	Site/stadium	Score	Win	Loss	Save	TV	Attendance	Overall record	SBC record
LSU Invitational
Mar. 4	at No. 22 LSU		Tiger Park • Baton Rouge, LA	**W** 5–4	**Johnson** (8-1)	Kilponen (7-2)	None		1,631	12–2	
Mar. 4	at No. 22 LSU		Tiger Park • Baton Rouge, LA	**L** 2–10^{6}	Sunseri (5-1)	**Baker** (2-1)	None		1,631	12–3	
Mar. 5	vs. Central Connecticut		Tiger Park • Baton Rouge, LA	**W** 11–1^{5}	**Baker** (3-1)	Marks (0-5)	None		116	13–3	
Mar. 5	vs. Louisiana Tech		Tiger Park • Baton Rouge, LA	**L** 2–6	Pickett (9-2)	**Johnson** (8-2)	None		181	13–4	
Mar. 6	vs. Louisiana Tech		Tiger Park • Baton Rouge, LA	**L** 6–7	Hutchinson (4-3)	**Bailey** (4-2)	None		82	13–5	
Mar. 11	at Coastal Carolina		St. John Stadium – Charles Wade-John Lott Field • Conway, SC	**W** 5–2	**Johnson** (9-2)	Beasley-Polko (4-4)	None		118	14–5	1–0
Mar. 13	at Coastal Carolina		St. John Stadium – Charles Wade-John Lott Field • Conway, SC	**W** 3–1	**Baker** (5-1)	Picone (4-3)	None		121	15–5	2–0
Mar. 13	at Coastal Carolina		St. John Stadium – Charles Wade-John Lott Field • Conway, SC	**L** 3–4	Beasley-Polko (5-4)	**Baker** (5-2)	None		131	15–6	2–1
Mar. 15	at NC State		Dail Softball Stadium • Raleigh, NC	**W** 7–0	**Johnson** (10-2)	Weixlmann (7–3)	None		67	16–6	
Mar. 18	Louisiana–Monroe		Troy Softball Complex • Troy, AL	**L** 0–1	Abrams (5-0)	**Johnson** (10-3)	None	ESPN+	127	16–7	2–2
Mar. 19	Louisiana–Monroe		Troy Softball Complex • Troy, AL	**W** 9–1^{6}	**Johnson** (11-3)	Kackley (4-2)	None	ESPN+	312	17–7	3–2
Mar. 20	Louisiana–Monroe		Troy Softball Complex • Troy, AL	**W** 6–4	**Baker** (5-2)	Abrams (5-0)	**Johnson** (2)	ESPN+	307	18–7	4–2
Mar. 23	No. 2 Florida State		Troy Softball Complex • Troy, AL	**L** 0–12^{5}	Sandercock (15-0)	**Johnson** (11-4)	None	ESPN+	2,121	18–8	
Mar. 25	at Georgia Southern		Eagle Field at GS Softball Complex • Statesboro, GA	**W** 9–0	**Johnson** (12-4)	Belogorksa (3-8)	None		273	19–8	5–2
Mar. 26	at Georgia Southern		Eagle Field at GS Softball Complex • Statesboro, GA	**L** 1–2	Waldrep (4-3)	**Baker** (5-3)	None		303	19–9	5–3
Mar. 27	at Georgia Southern		Eagle Field at GS Softball Complex • Statesboro, GA	**W** 3–1	**Johnson** (13-4)	Waldrep (4-4)	None		344	20–9	6–3
Mar. 30	at Samford		Samford Softball Field • Birmingham, AL	Game postponed							
Mar. 30	at Samford		Samford Softball Field • Birmingham, AL	Game postponed							

April (7–8)
Date	Opponent	Rank	Site/stadium	Score	Win	Loss	Save	TV	Attendance	Overall record	SBC record
Apr. 1	Georgia State		Troy Softball Complex • Troy, AL	**W** 1–0	**Johnson** (14-4)	Adams (3-6)	None	ESPN+	117	21–9	7–3
Apr. 2	Georgia State		Troy Softball Complex • Troy, AL	**W** 4–2	**Baker** (6-3)	Mooney (2-5)	None	ESPN+	212	22–9	8–3
Apr. 3	Georgia State		Troy Softball Complex • Troy, AL	**L** 0–4	Adams (4-6)	**Johnson** (14-5)	None	ESPN+	227	22–10	8–4
Apr. 5	at Georgia Tech		Shirley Clements Mewborn Field • Atlanta, GA	Game postponed							
Apr. 8	at Louisiana		Yvette Girouard Field at Lamson Park • Lafayette, LA	**L** 1–7	Landry (11-2)	**Johnson** (14-6)	None	ESPN+	1,583	22–11	8–5
Apr. 9	at Louisiana		Yvette Girouard Field at Lamson Park • Lafayette, LA	**L** 1–7	Lamb (7-4)	**Johnson** (14-7)	None	ESPN+	1,608	22–12	8–6
Apr. 10	at Louisiana		Yvette Girouard Field at Lamson Park • Lafayette, LA	**L** 0–10 (6 inns)	Landry (12-2)	**Baker** (6-4)	None	ESPN+	1,596	22–13	8–7
Apr. 14	Appalachian State		Troy Softball Complex • Troy, AL	**W** 2–0	**Johnson** (15-7)	Buckner (10-7)	None	ESPN+	107	23–13	9–7
Apr. 15	Appalachian State		Troy Softball Complex • Troy, AL	**W** 6–2	**Johnson** (16-7)	Neas (6-2)	None	ESPN+	67	24–13	10–7
Apr. 15	Appalachian State		Troy Softball Complex • Troy, AL	**W** 7–3	**Baker** (7-4)	Buckner (10-8)	None	ESPN+	103	25–13	11–7
Apr. 19	at Georgia Tech		Shirley Clements Mewborn Field • Atlanta, GA	**L** 1–8	Neleman (13-6)	**Johnson** (16-8)	Dennis (2)	ACCNX	229	25–14	
Apr. 22	UT Arlington		Troy Softball Complex • Troy, AL	**W** 5–0	**Johnson** (17-8)	Adams (12-13)	None	ESPN+	97	26–14	12–7
Apr. 23	UT Arlington		Troy Softball Complex • Troy, AL	**L** 1–3	Max (3-0)	**Cannon** (0-1)	None		113	26–15	12–8
Apr. 24	UT Arlington		Troy Softball Complex • Troy, AL	**W** 5–0	**Johnson** (18-8)	Max (3-1)	None	ESPN+	189	27–15	13–8
Apr. 29	at Texas State		Bobcats Softball Stadium • San Marcos, TX	**L** 1–5	Mullins (21-11)	**Johnson** (18-9)	None	ESPN+	453	27–16	13–9
Apr. 30	at Texas State		Bobcats Softball Stadium • San Marcos, TX	**L** 1–2	Mullins (22-11)	**Baker** (7-5)	None	ESPN+	555	27–17	13–10

May (2–2)
Date	Opponent	Rank	Site/stadium	Score	Win	Loss	Save	TV	Attendance	Overall record	SBC record
May 1	at Texas State		Bobcats Softball Stadium • San Marcos, TX	**L** 2–5	Mullins (23-11)	**Johnson** (18-10)	None	ESPN+	493	27–18	13–11
May 5	South Alabama		Troy Softball Complex • Troy, AL	**W** 3–2	**Johnson** (19-10)	Lackie (13-7)	None	ESPN+	321	28–18	14–11
May 6	South Alabama		Troy Softball Complex • Troy, AL	**W** 7–2	**Baker** (8-5)	Hardy (8-9)	None	ESPN+	423	29–18	15–11
May 7	South Alabama		Troy Softball Complex • Troy, AL	**L** 0–9^{6}	Lackie (14-7)	**Johnson** (19-11)	None	ESPN+	219	29–19	15–12

Post-Season (2–2)

SBC tournament (2–2)
Date	Opponent	(Seed)/Rank	Site/stadium	Score	Win	Loss	Save	TV	Attendance	Overall record	Tournament record
May 11	vs. (5) UT Arlington	(4)	Jaguar Field • Mobile, AL	**W** 2–1	**Johnson** (20-11)	Adams (12-17)	None	ESPN+	120	30–19	1–0
May 12	vs. (1)/No. 25 Louisiana	(4)	Jaguar Field • Mobile, AL	**L** 1–9^{5}	Landry (19-3)	**Johnson** (20-12)	None	ESPN+	185	30–20	1–1
May 13	vs. (7) Georgia State	(4)	Jaguar Field • Mobile, AL	**W** 5–0	**Baker** (9-5)	Buck (9-8)	None	ESPN+	129	31–20	2–1
May 13	vs. (9) Coastal Carolina	(4)	Jaguar Field • Mobile, AL	**L** 2–3	Beasley-Polko (15-10)	**Baker** (9-6)	None	ESPN+	81	31–21	2–2

Schedule source:

*Rankings are based on the team's current ranking in the NFCA/USA Softball poll.
