= 2022 UT Arlington Mavericks softball team =

American college softball season

2022 UT Arlington Mavericks softball
- Conference: Sun Belt Conference
- Record: 22–27 (12–15 SBC)
- Head coach: Peejay Brun (5th season)
- Assistant coaches: Matthew Alberghini; Erin Arevalo
- Home stadium: Allan Saxe Field

2022 Sun Belt Conference softball standings
	Conf.				Overall
Team	W		L	PCT	W		L	PCT
Louisiana ‍†‍‡‍^{y}	23	–	4	.852	47	–	13	.783
South Alabama ‍‍‍	16	–	6	.727	26	–	21	.553
Texas State ‍‍‍	19	–	8	.704	39	–	19	.672
Troy ‍‍‍	15	–	12	.556	32	–	20	.615
UT Arlington ‍‍‍	12	–	15	.444	22	–	28	.440
Appalachian State ‍‍‍	10	–	15	.400	29	–	26	.527
Georgia State ‍‍‍	9	–	15	.375	21	–	34	.382
Louisiana–Monroe ‍‍‍	10	–	17	.370	27	–	27	.500
Coastal Carolina ‍‍‍	7	–	17	.292	25	–	29	.463
Georgia Southern ‍‍‍	6	–	18	.250	13	–	34	.277
† – Conference champion ‡ – Tournament champion y – Invited to the NCAA tournament As of June 5, 2022; Rankings from NFCA/USA Today

The 2022 UT Arlington Mavericks softball team represented the University of Texas at Arlington during the 2022 NCAA Division I softball season. The Mavericks played their home games at Allan Saxe Field. The Mavericks were led by fifth, and final, year head coach Peejay Brun and were members of the Sun Belt Conference.

== Preseason ==
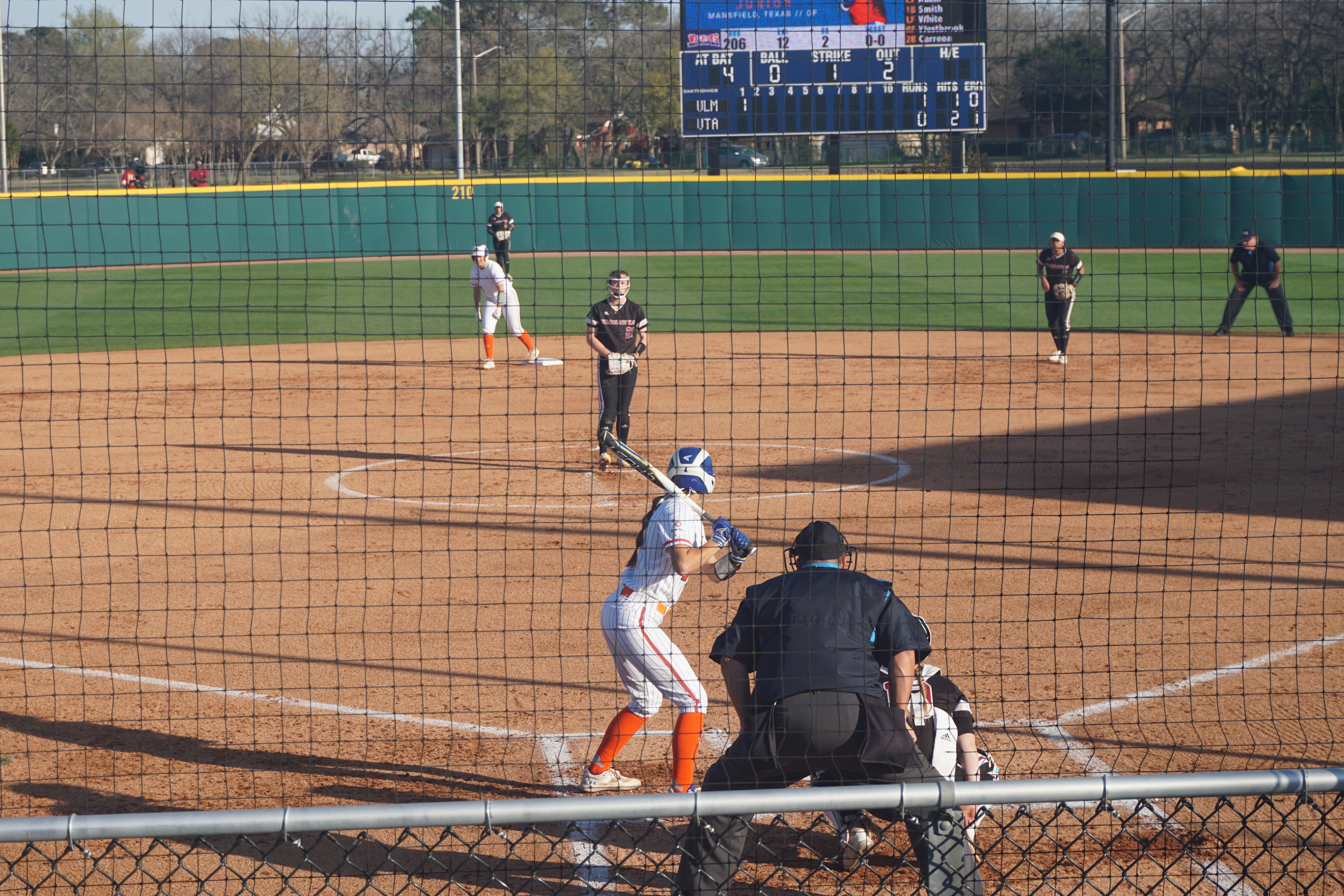
UT Arlington in action against Louisiana–Monroe

=== Sun Belt Conference Coaches Poll ===
The Sun Belt Conference Coaches Poll was released on January 31, 2022. UT Arlington was picked to finish fifth in the conference with 49 votes.

Coaches poll
Predicted finish	Team	Votes (1st place)
1	Louisiana	97 (7)
2	Texas State	87 (2)
3	Troy	82 (1)
4	South Alabama	74
5	UT Arlington	49
6	Appalachian State	46
7	Coastal Carolina	37
8	Georgia Southern	32
9	Louisiana–Monroe	27
10	Georgia State	19

=== National Softball Signing Day ===
Player	Position	Hometown	Previous Team
Kailee Bautista	Catcher	Rockwall, Texas	Rockwall-Heath HS
Alaina Hampton	Infielder	Pearland, Texas	Pearland HS
Marley Neises	Catcher/Utility	Cedar Park, Texas	Leander HS
Nikki Donahue	Catcher/Infielder	Honolulu, Hawaii	Kamehameha Schools
Giselle Villarreal	Infielder	Rosenberg, Texas	B. F. Terry HS

== Personnel ==
2022 UT Arlington Mavericks softball team
Players
Coaches

#	Pos.	Name	Bats/throws	Height	Year	Home town
0	OF	Aaliyah White	L/R	5 ft 2 in (1.57 m)	Fr	Angleton, Texas
1	INF	Jessica Carreon	L/R	5 ft 4 in (1.63 m)	So	College Station, Texas
3	INF	Kaylee Cavazos	R/R	5 ft 4 in (1.63 m)	Fr	San Marcos, Texas
4	OF	Reagan Hukill	R/R	5 ft 7 in (1.7 m)	Jr	Mansfield, Texas
5	OF	Dariane Cram	L/R	5 ft 3 in (1.6 m)	So	Dickinson, Texas
6	INF	Kimber Cortemelia	R/R	5 ft 5 in (1.65 m)	Sr	Lake Jackson, Texas
7	C	Sophie Wideman	R/R	5 ft 4 in (1.63 m)	Sr	Woodway, Texas
8	OF	Jadyn Erickson	L/R	5 ft 4 in (1.63 m)	Jr	Pleasant Hill, Iowa
9	INF	KJ Murphy	R/R	5 ft 8 in (1.73 m)	Sr	Baytown, Texas
10	C	Courtney Ogle	R/R	5 ft 8 in (1.73 m)	Sr	Austin, Texas
11	INF	Jacquelyn Adams	R/R	5 ft 8 in (1.73 m)	Fr	Bryan, Texas
13	OF	Reese Scott	L/R	5 ft 5 in (1.65 m)	So	Sugar Land, Texas
14	OF	Nicole Hill	L/R	5 ft 8 in (1.73 m)	Fr	Bonita, California
15	RHP	Jessica Adams	R/R	5 ft 8 in (1.73 m)	Fr	Bryan, Texas
16	LHP	Morgan Max	L/L	5 ft 6 in (1.68 m)	Fr	Moore, Oklahoma
17	OF	Amber Langston	R/R	5 ft 2 in (1.57 m)	Sr	Pearland, Texas
19	RHP	Kenedy Hines	R/R	5 ft 4 in (1.63 m)	Jr	Spring, Texas
21	RHP	Laura Henriksen	R/R	5 ft 11 in (1.8 m)	Sr	Los Alamitos, California
22	RHP	Gracie Bumpurs	R/R	5 ft 10 in (1.78 m)	So	Splendora, Texas
23	C	Jaden Hoelker	R/R	5 ft 9 in (1.75 m)	Sr	Aubrey, Texas
24	OF	Morgan Westbrook	R/R	5 ft 10 in (1.78 m)	So	Houston, Texas
25	OF	Haley Mountain	R/R	5 ft 6 in (1.68 m)	Fr	The Woodlands, Texas
27	INF	Lindsey Franklin	R/R	5 ft 8 in (1.73 m)	Jr	Weatherford, Texas
33	INF	Meagan Smith	R/R	5 ft 8 in (1.73 m)	Sr	Lake Jackson, Texas
77	C	Morgan Rios	R/R	5 ft 8 in (1.73 m)	Sr	Mansfield, Texas

Head coach

Peejay Brun (Cal State Dominguez Hills)

Assistant coach(es)

Erin Arevalo (Georgia)
Taylor Satchell (Texas Tech)

Legend

- (C) Team captain
- (S) Suspended
- (I) Ineligible
- Injured
- Current redshirt

Roster
Last update: 11 June 2022

== Schedule and results ==
Legend
	UT Arlington win
	UT Arlington loss
	Postponement/Cancellation
**Bold**	UT Arlington team member

2022 UT Arlington softball game log
Regular season (22–25)

February (6–7)
Date	Opponent	Rank	Site/stadium	Score	Win	Loss	Save	TV	Attendance	Overall record	SBC record
Aggie Classic
Feb. 11	vs. Western Kentucky		Davis Diamond • College Station, TX	**L** 1–3	Nunn (1-0)	**Bumpurs** (0-1)	None			0–1	
Feb. 11	at Texas A&M		Davis Diamond • College Station, TX	**L** 0–9^{5}	Herzog (1-0)	**Adams** (0-1)	None		1,321	0–2	
Feb. 12	vs. Texas A&M–Corpus Christi		Davis Diamond • College Station, TX	**L** 0–2^{8}	Beatriz (1-0)	**Adams** (0-2)	None			0–3	
Feb. 12	at Texas A&M		Davis Diamond • College Station, TX	Game cancelled							
Feb. 13	at Texas A&M		Davis Diamond • College Station, TX	**L** 1–9^{5}	Ackerman (1-0)	**Bumpurs** (0-2)	None		1,071	0–4	
Feb. 16	at UTEP		Helen of Troy Softball Complex • El Paso, TX	Game cancelled							
Troy Cox Invitational
Feb. 17	at New Mexico State		NM State Softball Complex • Las Cruces, NM	**W** 6–5	**Adams** (1-2)	De La Torre (0-4)	None		148	1–4	
Feb. 18	vs. Northern Colorado		NM State Softball Complex • Las Cruces, MM	**W** 6–4	**Bumpurs** (1-2)	Golden (1-2)	None		145	2–4	
Feb. 18	at New Mexico State		NM State Softball Complex • Las Cruces, NM	**L** 7–12	King (1-1)	**Adams** (1-3)	None		433	2–5	
Feb. 19	vs. Southeastern Louisiana		NM State Softball Complex • Las Cruces, NM	**W** 5–1	**Adams** (2-3)	DuBois (0-1)	None			3–5	
Feb. 19	Nebraska		NM State Softball Complex • Las Cruces, NM	**L** 2–6	Wallace (4-1)	**Henriksen** (0-1)	None			3–6	
Feb. 23	Baylor		Allan Saxe Field • Arlington, TX	**W** 12–3^{5}	**Adams** (3-3)	Hertenberger (1-1)	None		323	4–6	
The Evangeline Bank & Trust II Invitational
Feb. 25	vs. Memphis		Joe Miller Field at Cowgirl Diamond • Lake Charles, LA	**L** 2–3	Siems (2-2)	**Adams** (3-4)	Hosc (1)			4–7	
Feb. 25	vs. Manhattan		Joe Miller Field at Cowgirl Diamond • Lake Charles, LA	**W** 5–4	**Bumpurs** (2-2)	Charest (0-1)	**Adams** (1)			5–7	
Feb. 26	vs. Sam Houston State		Joe Miller Field at Cowgirl Diamond • Lake Charles, LA	**W** 8–5	**Adams** (4-4)	Dunn (1-2)	None			6–7	
Feb. 27	at McNeese State		Joe Miller Field at Cowgirl Diamond • Lake Charles, LA	Game cancelled							

March (6–7)
Date	Opponent	Rank	Site/stadium	Score	Win	Loss	Save	TV	Attendance	Overall record	SBC record
Mar. 2	at North Texas		Lovelace Stadium • Denton, TX	Game cancelled							
Boerner Invitational
Mar. 4	Fordham		Allan Saxe Field • Arlington, TX	Game cancelled							
Mar. 4	UTSA		Allan Saxe Field • Arlington, TX	Game cancelled							
Mar. 5	Northwestern State		Allan Saxe Field • Arlington, TX	Game cancelled							
Mar. 8	Stephen F. Austin		Allan Saxe Field • Arlington, TX	**L** 0–2	Wilbur (4-6)	**Adams** (4-5)	None		156	6–8	
Mar. 11	South Alabama		Allan Saxe Field • Arlington, TX	**L** 0–8^{5}	Lackie (5-3)	**Adams** (4-6)	None		156	6–9	0–1
Mar. 12	South Alabama		Allan Saxe Field • Arlington, TX	**L** 3–9	Hardy (2-7)	**Bumpurs** (2-3)	None		316	6–10	0–2
Mar. 13	South Alabama		Allan Saxe Field • Arlington, TX	**L** 0–10	Hardy (3-7)	**Adams** (4-7)	None		282	6–11	0–3
Mar. 15	at Incarnate Word		H-E-B Field • San Antonio, TX	**W** 11–5	**Adams** (5-7)	Gunther (4-8)	None		101	7–11	
Mar. 16	No. 10 Oklahoma State		Allan Saxe Field • Arlington, TX	**W** 3–1	**Adams** (6-7)	Day (4-2)	None		709	8–11	
Mar. 18	Coastal Carolina		Allan Saxe Field • Arlington, TX	**W** 11–5	**Bumpurs** (3-3)	Volpe (1-2)	None		289	9–11	1–3
Mar. 19	Coastal Carolina		Allan Saxe Field • Arlington, TX	**W** 5–2	**Bumpurs** (4-3)	Picone (5-5)	**Adams** (2)		159	10–11	2–3
Mar. 20	Coastal Carolina		Allan Saxe Field • Arlington, TX	**W** 5–2	**Adams** (7-7)	De Jesus (0-2)	None		244	11–11	3–3
Mar. 23	at Northwestern State		Lady Demon Diamond • Natchitoches, LA	Game cancelled due to poor field conditions							
Mar. 25	at Louisiana		Yvette Girouard Field at Lamson Park • Lafayette, LA	**L** 1–9^{6}	Landry (8-2)	**Adams** (7-8)	None		1,854	11–12	3–4
Mar. 26	at Louisiana		Yvette Girouard Field at Lamson Park • Lafayette, LA	**L** 0–10^{5}	Lamb (6-4)	**Bumpurs** (4-4)	None		1,893	11–13	3–5
Mar. 27	at Louisiana		Yvette Girouard Field at Lamson Park • Lafayette, LA	**L** 0–10^{5}	Landry (9-2)	**Adams** (7-9)	None		1,739	11–14	3–6
Mar. 30	Sam Houston State		Allan Saxe Field • Arlington, TX	**W** 1–0	**Bumpurs** (5-4)	Dunn (2-6)	None		506	12–14	

April (10–8)
Date	Opponent	Rank	Site/stadium	Score	Win	Loss	Save	TV	Attendance	Overall record	SBC record
Apr. 1	Louisiana–Monroe		Allan Saxe Field • Arlington, TX	**W** 3–2	**Adams** (8-9)	Chavarria (3-5)	None	ESPN+	294	13–14	4–6
Apr. 2	Louisiana–Monroe		Allan Saxe Field • Arlington, TX	**W** 5–4	**Bumpurs** (6-4)	Chavarria (3-6)	None	ESPN+	345	14–14	5–6
Apr. 3	Louisiana–Monroe		Allan Saxe Field • Arlington, TX	**W** 2–1	**Adams** (9-9)	Kackley (5-4)	None	ESPN+	320	15–14	6–6
Apr. 6	at No. 19 Texas		Red and Charline McCombs Field • Austin, TX	**L** 4–14	Simpson (6-2)	**Adams** (9-10)	None		923	15–15	
Apr. 8	at Georgia State		Robert E. Heck Softball Complex • Panthersville, GA	**W** 5–1	**Adams** (10-10)	Adams (4-7)	None		110	16–15	7–6
Apr. 9	at Georgia State		Robert E. Heck Softball Complex • Panthersville, GA	**L** 5–11	Buck (5-4)	**Bumpurs** (6-5)	Mooney (1)		192	16–16	7–7
Apr. 10	at Georgia State		Robert E. Heck Softball Complex • Panthersville, GA	**L** 7–8^{8}	Buck (6-4)	**Adams** (10-11)	None		123	16–17	7–8
Apr. 12	at Abilene Christian		Poly Wells Field • Abilene, TX	**W** 9–0 (5 inns)	**Max** (1-0)	White (7-8)	None		75	17–17	
Apr. 15	Georgia Southern		Allan Saxe Field • Arlington, TX	**W** 5–0	**Adams** (11-11)	Waldrep (6-6)	None		254	18–17	8–8
Apr. 16	Georgia Southern		Allan Saxe Field • Arlington, TX	**W** 9–5	**Max** (2-0)	Richardson (1-6)	None	ESPN+	156	19–17	9–8
Apr. 16	Georgia Southern		Allan Saxe Field • Arlington, TX	**W** 6–0^{6}	**Adams** (12-11)	Waldrep (6-7)	None	ESPN+	300	20–17	10–8
Apr. 19	Baylor		Allan Saxe Field • Arlington, TX	**L** 1–2^{9}	Orme (10-10)	**Adams** (12-12)	None		301	20–18	
Apr. 22	at Troy		Troy Softball Complex • Troy, AL	**L** 0–5	Johnson (17-8)	**Adams** (12-13)	None	ESPN+	97	20–19	10–9
Apr. 23	at Troy		Troy Softball Complex • Troy, AL	**W** 3–1	**Max** (3-0)	Cannon (0-1)	None		113	21–19	11–9
Apr. 24	at Troy		Troy Softball Complex • Troy, AL	**L** 0–5	Johnson (18-8)	**Max** (3-1)	None	ESPN+	189	21–20	11–10
Apr. 29	at Appalachian State		Sywassink/Lloyd Family Stadium • Boone, NC	**L** 6–7	Northrop (4-5)	**Bumpurs** (6-6)	Buckner (1)		219	21–21	11–11
Apr. 29	at Appalachian State		Sywassink/Lloyd Family Stadium • Boone, NC	**L** 2–7	Buckner (12-8)	**Adams** (12-14)	None		188	21–22	11–12
Apr. 30	at Appalachian State		Sywassink/Lloyd Family Stadium • Boone, NC	**W** 4–1	**Max** (4-1)	Buckner (11-9)	None		237	22–22	12–12

May (0–3)
Date	Opponent	Rank	Site/stadium	Score	Win	Loss	Save	TV	Attendance	Overall record	SBC record
May 5	Texas State		Allan Saxe Field • Arlington, TX	**L** 2–11^{5}	Mullins (24-11)	**Max** (4-2)	None		300	22–23	12–13
May 6	Texas State		Allan Saxe Field • Arlington, TX	**L** 2–7	Mullins (25-11)	**Adams** (12-15)	None		318	22–24	12–14
May 7	Texas State		Allan Saxe Field • Arlington, TX	**L** 0–4	Pierce (7-4)	**Adams** (12-16)	None		334	22–25	12–15

Post-Season (0–2)

SBC tournament (0–2)
Date	Opponent	(Seed)/Rank	Site/stadium	Score	Win	Loss	Save	TV	Attendance	Overall record	Tournament record
May 11	vs. (4) Troy	(5)	Jaguar Field • Mobile, AL	**L** 1–2	Johnson (20-11)	**Adams** (12-17)	None	ESPN+	120	22–26	0–1
May 12	vs. (7) Georgia State	(5)	Jaguar Field • Mobile, AL	**L** 3–5	Buck (9-7)	**Max** (4-3)	None	ESPN+	44	22–27	0–2

Schedule source:

*Rankings are based on the team's current ranking in the NFCA/USA Softball poll.
