= 2022 South Alabama Jaguars softball team =

American college softball season

2022 South Alabama Jaguars softball
- Conference: Sun Belt Conference
- Record: 25–21 (16–6 SBC)
- Head coach: Becky Clark (16th season)
- Assistant coaches: Kristina McCain; Hannah Campbell
- Home stadium: Jaguar Field

2022 Sun Belt Conference softball standings
	Conf.				Overall
Team	W		L	PCT	W		L	PCT
Louisiana ‍†‍‡‍^{y}	23	–	4	.852	47	–	13	.783
South Alabama ‍‍‍	16	–	6	.727	26	–	21	.553
Texas State ‍‍‍	19	–	8	.704	39	–	19	.672
Troy ‍‍‍	15	–	12	.556	32	–	20	.615
UT Arlington ‍‍‍	12	–	15	.444	22	–	28	.440
Appalachian State ‍‍‍	10	–	15	.400	29	–	26	.527
Georgia State ‍‍‍	9	–	15	.375	21	–	34	.382
Louisiana–Monroe ‍‍‍	10	–	17	.370	27	–	27	.500
Coastal Carolina ‍‍‍	7	–	17	.292	25	–	29	.463
Georgia Southern ‍‍‍	6	–	18	.250	13	–	34	.277
† – Conference champion ‡ – Tournament champion y – Invited to the NCAA tournament As of June 5, 2022; Rankings from NFCA/USA Today

The 2022 South Alabama Jaguars softball team represented the University of South Alabama during the 2022 NCAA Division I softball season. The Jaguars played their home games at Jaguar Field. The Jaguars were led by sixteenth-year head coach Becky Clark and were members of the Sun Belt Conference.

== Preseason ==
=== Sun Belt Conference Coaches Poll ===
The Sun Belt Conference Coaches Poll was released on January 31, 2022. South Alabama was picked to finish fourth in the conference with 74 votes.

Coaches poll
Predicted finish	Team	Votes (1st place)
1	Louisiana	97 (7)
2	Texas State	87 (2)
3	Troy	82 (1)
4	South Alabama	74
5	UT Arlington	49
6	Appalachian State	46
7	Coastal Carolina	37
8	Georgia Southern	32
9	Louisiana–Monroe	27
10	Georgia State	19

=== Preseason All-Sun Belt team ===
- Olivia Lackie (USA, Pitcher)
- Leanna Johnson (TROY, Pitcher)
- Kandra Lamb (LA, Pitcher)
- Jessica Mullins (TXST, Pitcher)
- Kamdyn Kvistad (USA, Catcher)
- Sophie Piskos (LA, Catcher)
- Faith Shirley (GASO, 1st Base)
- Kelly Horne (TROY, 2nd Base)
- Daisy Hess (GSU, Shortstop)
- Sara Vanderford (TXST, 3rd Base)
- Iyanla De Jesus (CCU, Designated Player)
- Raina O'Neal (LA, Outfielder)
- Mackenzie Brasher (USA, Outfielder)
- Emily Brown (GSU, Outfielder)
- Jade Sinness (TROY, Outfielder)

=== National Softball Signing Day ===
Player	Position	Hometown	Previous Team
Brooklynn Bockhaus	Outfielder/Utility	Haughton, Louisiana	Haughton HS
Marlayna Capaldi	Infielder	Wilmington, Delaware	Charter of Wilmington
Sophia Mendoza	Catcher/Infielder	Leigh Acres, Florida	Riverdale HS
Madison Lagle	Pitcher/Infielder	Glen St. Mary, Florida	Baker County HS

== Personnel ==
2022 South Alabama Jaguars softball team
Players
Coaches

#	Pos.	Name	Bats/throws	Height	Year	Home town
0	INF	Meredith Keel	L/R	5 ft 4 in (1.63 m)	Sr	Ashville, Ohio
2	OF	Erin McGlothlin	L/R	5 ft 7 in (1.7 m)	Fr	Homestead, Florida
3	U	Emma Kropp	R/R	5 ft 8 in (1.73 m)	Jr	Fairhope, Alabama
4	RHP	Allie Hughen	R/R	5 ft 8 in (1.73 m)	Sr	Vista, California
6	U	Abby Allen	R/R	5 ft 4 in (1.63 m)	So	Monroe, Louisiana
7	OF	Caroline Nichols	L/R	5 ft 1 in (1.55 m)	Sr	Hoover, Alabama
8	LHP	Rachel Everett	L/L	5 ft 10 in (1.78 m)	Fr	Hartland, Michigan
9	U	Stephanie Gonzalez	R/R	5 ft 5 in (1.65 m)	Fr	Pembroke Pines, Florida
10	C	Kassidy Wilcox	R/R	5 ft 6 in (1.68 m)	Jr	Brantley, Alabama
11	U	Kamdyn Kvistad	R/R	5 ft 6 in (1.68 m)	Sr	Lake City, Florida
12	OF	Shelby Sloan (redshirt)	L/R	5 ft 6 in (1.68 m)	So	Baker, Florida
13	INF	Gabby Stagner	R/R	5 ft 9 in (1.75 m)	Fr	Mobile, Alabama
14	OF	Bailey Welch	L/R	5 ft 6 in (1.68 m)	So	Hueytown, Alabama
18	OF	Mackenzie Brasher	L/R	5 ft 5 in (1.65 m)	Jr	Orange Beach, Alabama
19	INF	Kennedy Cronan	R/R	5 ft 9 in (1.75 m)	Sr	Daphne, Alabama
21	U	Hannah Ogea (redshirt)	R/R	5 ft 7 in (1.7 m)	Fr	Baton Rouge, Louisiana
23	INF	Belle Wolfenden	R/R	5 ft 4 in (1.63 m)	Sr	Cantonment, Florida
24	INF	Shelby Garrett	R/R	5 ft 8 in (1.73 m)	Fr	Frostproof, Florida
25	U	Janeah Finney	R/R	5 ft 5 in (1.65 m)	Sr	Whatley, Alabama
27	INF	Odalys Cordova	R/R	5 ft 5 in (1.65 m)	Jr	Orlando, Florida
28	LHP	Kaitlyn Hughes	L/L	5 ft 7 in (1.7 m)	So	Trussville, Alabama
34	OF	Victoria Ortiz (redshirt)	L/L	5 ft 6 in (1.68 m)	Jr	Mobile, Alabama
35	RHP	Jenna Hardy	R/R	6 ft 0 in (1.83 m)	Jr	Whitehouse, Ohio
99	RHP	Olivia Lackie	R/R	6 ft 0 in (1.83 m)	So	Walker, Louisiana

Head coach

Becky Clark (Mobile)

Assistant coach(es)

Kristina McCain (Auburn)
Hannah Campbell (South Alabama)
Terri McCormick (Mobile)

Legend

- (C) Team captain
- (S) Suspended
- (I) Ineligible
- Injured
- Current redshirt

Roster
Last update: 8 June 2022

== Schedule and results ==
Legend
	South Alabama win
	South Alabama loss
	Postponement/Cancellation/Suspensions
**Bold**	South Alabama team member

2022 South Alabama Jaguars softball game log
Regular season (24–19)

February (4–10)
Date	Opponent	Rank	Site/stadium	Score	Win	Loss	Save	TV	Attendance	Overall record	SBC record
Tiger Classic
Feb. 11	vs. Central Arkansas		Tiger Park • Baton Rouge, LA	**W** 7–4	**Hughes** (1-0)	Johnson (0-1)	**Lackie** (1)		210	1–0	
Feb. 11	at No. 17 LSU		Tiger Park • Baton Rouge	**L** 0–3	Sunseri (1-0)	**Hughen** (0-1)	None			1–1	
Feb. 12	vs. Illinois		Tiger Park • Baton Rouge, LA	**L** 2–3	Wiles (1-1)	**Hardy** (0-1)	None		100	1–2	
Feb. 12	at No. 17 LSU		Tiger Park • Baton Rouge, LA	**L** 1–8	Kilponen (2-0)	**Lackie** (0-1)	None			1–3	
Feb. 16	at No. 5 Florida State		JoAnne Graf Field at the Seminole Softball Complex • Tallahassee, FL	**L** 3–4	Sandercock (2-0)	**Hardy** (0-2)	Wilson (1)		732	1–4	
THE Spring Games
Feb. 18	vs. No. 14 Missouri		Sleepy Hollow Sports Complex • Leesburg, FL	**L** 2–3	Schumacher (2-0)	**Lackie** (0-2)	None			1–5	
Feb. 18	vs. Ohio State		Sleepy Hollow Sports Complex • Leesburg, FL	**L** 2–4	Handley (2-0)	**Hardy** (0-4)	None		144	1–6	
Feb. 19	vs. Butler		Sleepy Hollow Sports Complex • Leesburg, FL	**L** 1–2	Graves (1-1)	**Hardy** (0-3)	None		158	1–7	
Feb. 20	vs. Liberty		Sleepy Hollow Sports Complex • Leesburg, FL	**L** 2–8	Keeney (3-2)	**Hughen** (0-2)	None		123	1–8	
The Snowman (Alex Wilcox Memorial Tournament)
Feb. 25	vs. Belmont		Nusz Park • Starkville, MS	**W** 9–1^{5}	**Lackie** (1-2)	Veltri (1-2)	None		103	2–8	
Feb. 25	vs. Longwood		Nusz Park • Starkville, MS	**W** 2–1	**Hardy** (1-4)	Backstrom (3-4)	**Lackie** (2)		122	3–8	
Feb. 26	vs. Longwood		Nusz Park • Starkville, MS	**L** 2–3	Backstrom (4-4)	**Hardy** (1-5)	None		114	3–9	
Feb. 26	at Mississippi State		Nusz Park • Starkville, MS	**W** 1–0	**Lackie** (2-2)	Hawk (3-1)	None		241	4–9	
Feb. 27	at Mississippi State		Nusz Park • Starkville, MS	**L** 0–5	Wesley (4-1)	**Hardy** (1-6)	None		157	4–10	

March (8–4)
Date	Opponent	Rank	Site/stadium	Score	Win	Loss	Save	TV	Attendance	Overall record	SBC record
Tennessee Invitational
Mar. 4	vs. Dartmouth		Sherri Parker Lee Stadium • Knoxville, TN	**W** 1–0	**Lackie** (3-2)	Plonka (1-3)	None			5–10	
Mar. 4	vs. Virginia		Sherri Parker Lee Stadium • Knoxville, TN	**L** 4–6	Henley (3-4)	**Hardy** (1-7)	None			5–11	
Mar. 5	at No. 17 Tennessee		Sherri Parker Lee Stadium • Knoxville, TN	**L** 0–9^{5}	Edmoundson (8-1)	**Hughen** (0-3)	None			5–12	
Mar. 5	vs. Virginia		Sherri Parker Lee Stadium • Knoxville, TN	**L** 3–5	Houge (6-2)	**Lackie** (3-3)	None		1,625	5–13	
Mar. 6	vs. Dartmouth		Sherri Parker Lee Stadium • Knoxville, TN	**W** 5–2	**Lackie** (4-3)	Hagge (0-1)	None			6–13	
Mar. 12	at UT Arlington		Allan Saxe Field • Arlington, TX	**W** 9–3	**Hardy** (2-7)	Bumpurs (2-3)	None		316	7–13	1–0
Mar. 12	at UT Arlington		Allan Saxe Field • Arlington, TX	**W** 8–0^{5}	**Lackie** (5-3)	Adams (4-6)	None		156	8–13	2–0
Mar. 13	at UT Arlington		Allan Saxe Field • Arlington, TX	**W** 10–0	**Hardy** (3-7)	Adams (4-7)	None		282	9–13	3–0
Mar. 16	Nicholls		Jaguar Field • Mobile, AL	**W** 3–0	**Hardy** (4-7)	Turner (5-7)	None		274	10–13	
Mar. 18	Texas State		Jaguar Field • Mobile, AL	**W** 2–1	**Lackie** (6-3)	Mullins (8-8)	None		36	11–13	4–0
Mar. 19	Texas State		Jaguar Field • Mobile, AL	**W** 7–0	**Hardy** (5-7)	Pierce (3-2)	None		407	12–13	5–0
Mar. 20	Texas State		Jaguar Field • Mobile, AL	**L** 0–3	Mullins (9-8)	**Lackie** (6-4)	None		352	12–14	5–1
Mar. 25	at Georgia State		Robert E. Heck Softball Complex • Panthersville, GA	Game cancelled							
Mar. 26	at Georgia State		Robert E. Heck Softball Complex • Panthersville, GA	Game cancelled							
Mar. 27	at Georgia State		Robert E. Heck Softball Complex • Panthersville, GA	Game cancelled							

April (10–3)
Date	Opponent	Rank	Site/stadium	Score	Win	Loss	Save	TV	Attendance	Overall record	SBC record
Apr. 1	Coastal Carolina		Jaguar Field • Mobile, AL	**W** 4–0	**Lackie** (7-4)	Beasley-Polko (8-6)	None		369	13–14	6–1
Apr. 2	Coastal Carolina		Jaguar Field • Mobile, AL	**W** 3–2	**Hardy** (6-7)	Picone (5-7)	None		347	14–14	7–1
Apr. 3	Coastal Carolina		Jaguar Field • Mobile, AL	**W** 3–0	**Lackie** (8-4)	Volpe (0-1)	None			15–14	8–1
Apr. 8	at Appalachian State		Sywassink/Lloyd Family Stadium • Boone, NC	Game suspended due to inclement weather							
Apr. 9	at Appalachian State		Sywassink/Lloyd Family Stadium • Boone, NC	Game cancelled							
Apr. 10	at Appalachian State		Sywassink/Lloyd Family Stadium • Boone, NC	**W** 10–6	**Lackie** (8-4)	Buckner (9-6)	None		125	16–14	9–1
Apr. 14	Louisiana		Jaguar Field • Mobile, AL	**L** 7–10	Schorman (7-4)	**Lackie** (9-5)	Landry (1)	ESPN+	302	16–15	9–2
Apr. 15	Louisiana		Jaguar Field • Mobile, AL	**L** 1–7	Lamb (8-4)	**Hardy** (6-8)	None	ESPN+	504	16–16	9–3
Apr. 15	Louisiana		Jaguar Field • Mobile, AL	**L** 1–2	Landry (13-2)	**Lackie** (9-6)	None	ESPN+	504	16–17	9–4
Apr. 20	at Nicholls		Swanner Field at Geo Surfaces Park • Thibodaux, LA	**W** 12–2^{5}	**Hughen** (1-3)	Turner (5-13)	None		123	17–17	
Apr. 22	at Louisiana–Monroe		Geo-Surfaces Field at the ULM Softball Complex • Monroe, LA	**W** 4–1	**Lackie** (10-6)	Kackley (8-6)	None		426	18–17	10–4
Apr. 23	at Louisiana–Monroe		Geo-Surfaces Field at the ULM Softball Complex • Monroe, LA	**W** 5–4	**Hardy** (7-8)	Abrams (7-5)	**Lackie** (3)		435	19–17	11–4
Apr. 24	at Louisiana–Monroe		Geo-Surfaces Field at the ULM Softball Complex • Monroe, LA	**W** 2–0	**Lackie** (11-6)	Kackley (8-7)	None		425	20–17	12–4
Apr. 29	Georgia Southern		Jaguar Field • Mobile, AL	**W** 8–1	**Lackie** (12-6)	Belogorska (3-12)	None	ESPN+	323	21–17	13–4
Apr. 30	Georgia Southern		Jaguar Field • Mobile, AL	**W** 3–1	**Hardy** (8-8)	Waldrep (5-13)	None	ESPN+	441	22–17	14–4

May (2–2)
Date	Opponent	Rank	Site/stadium	Score	Win	Loss	Save	TV	Attendance	Overall record	SBC record
May 1	Georgia Southern		Jaguar Field • Mobile, AL	**W** 4–0	**Lackie** (13-6)	Belogorska (3-13)	None	ESPN+	302	23–17	15–4
May 5	at Troy		Troy Softball Complex • Troy, AL	**L** 2–3	Johnson (19-10)	**Lackie** (13-7)	None		321	23–18	15–5
May 6	at Troy		Troy Softball Complex • Troy, AL	**L** 2–7	Baker (8-5)	**Hardy** (8-9)	None		423	23–19	15–6
May 7	at Troy		Troy Softball Complex • Troy, AL	**W** 9–0^{6}	**Lackie** (14-7)	Johnson (19-11)	None		219	24–19	16–6

Post-Season (1–2)

SBC tournament (1–2)
Date	Opponent	(Seed)/Rank	Site/stadium	Score	Win	Loss	Save	TV	Attendance	Overall record	Tournament record
May 11	vs. (7) Georgia State	(2)	Jaguar Field • Mobile, AL	**W** 10–2^{5}	**Lackie** (15-7)	Adams (5-13)	None	ESPN+	487	25–19	1–0
May 12	vs. (3) Texas State	(2)	Jaguar Field • Mobile, AL	**L** 2–4^{9}	Mullins (27-11)	**Lackie** (15-8)	None	ESPN+	278	25–20	1–1
May 13	vs. (9) Coastal Carolina	(2)	Jaguar Field • Mobile, AL	**L** 0–3	Volpe (3-5)	**Hardy** (8-10)	None	ESPN+	134	25–21	1–2

Schedule source:

*Rankings are based on the team's current ranking in the NFCA/USA Softball poll.
