= University Field (Jacksonville State) =

University softball field in Jacksonville, Alabama

- Interactive map of University Field
- Location: 700 Pelham Road; Jacksonville, AL 36265
- Coordinates: 33.826672°N 85.762459°W
- Owner: Jacksonville State University
- Operator: Jacksonville State University
- Capacity: 2,000 (2013-Present); 1,000 (prior to 2013)

Construction
- Renovated: 1995 (converted from baseball to softball); 2013 (expanded)

Tenants
- Jacksonville State Gamecocks softball (NCAA) (1996–present); Jacksonville State Gamecocks baseball (until 1995)

University Field is a 2,000-seat softball stadium on the east side of the campus of Jacksonville State University in Jacksonville, Alabama. Per Physical Plant Director Dave Thompson, the bleacher seating capacity is 525 but could be pushed to 600 if needed. It serves as the home field of the Jacksonville State Gamecocks softball team and served as the home field of the Jacksonville State Gamecocks baseball team until 1995, when that team moved to Rudy Abbott Field on the west side of campus.

== History ==
University Field, located on the east side of campus near the intersection of Pelham Road (SR-21) and Nisbet Street (SR-204), served as the original home field of the Jacksonville State Gamecocks baseball team, most notably during their 1990 and 1991 Division II national championship seasons. When Rudy Abbott Field opened in 1995, the baseball team relocated there. In 1996, after the university's athletic teams began Division I play in the Trans-America Athletic Conference, the softball team began its tenure at University Field with a doubleheader over Tennessee State. University Field was renovated prior to the 2013 season with expanded seating, including chairback seating behind home plate, and new dugouts.
