= 2022 Southeastern Louisiana Lady Lions softball team =

American college softball season

2022 Southeastern Louisiana Lady Lions softball
- Conference: Southland Conference
- Record: 40–16 (14–4 Southland)
- Head coach: Rick Fremin (7th season)
- Assistant coaches: Katie Godwin; Alana Fremin
- Home stadium: North Oak Park

2022 Southland Conference softball standings
| | Conf. | | | | Overall |
| Team | W | | L | PCT | W | | L | PCT |
|---|---|---|---|---|---|---|---|---|
| McNeese State ‍†‍‡‍^{y} | 15 | – | 3 | .833 | 40 | – | 21 | .656 |
| Southeastern Louisiana ‍‍‍ | 14 | – | 4 | .778 | 40 | – | 16 | .714 |
| Texas A&M–Corpus Christi ‍‍‍ | 11 | – | 7 | .611 | 25 | – | 27 | .481 |
| Northwestern State ‍‍‍ | 10 | – | 8 | .556 | 29 | – | 22 | .569 |
| Incarnate Word ‍‍‍ | 5 | – | 13 | .278 | 15 | – | 36 | .294 |
| Houston Baptist ‍‍‍ | 4 | – | 13 | .235 | 19 | – | 29 | .396 |
| Nicholls ‍‍‍ | 4 | – | 14 | .222 | 12 | – | 38 | .240 |
† – Conference champion ‡ – Tournament champion y – Invited to the NCAA tournament As of June 5, 2022; Rankings from NFCA/USA Today

The 2022 Southeastern Louisiana Lady Lions softball team represented Southeastern Louisiana University during the 2022 NCAA Division I softball season. The Lady Lions played their home games at North Oak Park and were led by seventh-year head coach Rick Fremin. They were members of the Southland Conference.

== Preseason ==
=== Southland Conference Coaches Poll ===
The Southland Conference Coaches Poll was released on February 4, 2022. Southeastern Louisiana was picked to finish third in the Southland Conference with 113 votes.

Coaches poll
| Predicted finish | Team | Votes (1st place) |
| 1 | McNeese State | 132 (12) |
| 2 | Northwestern State | 120 (2) |
| 3 | Southeastern Louisiana | 113 |
| 4 | Houston Baptist | 102 |
| 5 | Incarnate Word | 84 |
| 6 | Texas A&M–Corpus Christi | 82 |
| 7 | Nicholls | 81 |

=== Preseason All-Southland team ===
==== First Team ====
- Caitlyn Brockway (HBU, JR, 1st Base)
- Cayla Jones (NSU, SR, 2nd Base)
- Lindsey Rizzo (SELA, SR, 3rd Base)
- Ashleigh Sgambelluri (TAMUCC, JR, Shortstop)
- Chloe Gomez (MCNS, SO, Catcher)
- Kaylee Lopez (MCNS, JR, Designated Player)
- Jil Poullard (MCNS, SO, Outfielder)
- Audrey Greely (SELA, SO, Outfielder)
- Aeriyl Mass (SELA, SR, Outfielder)
- Pal Egan (TAMUCC, JR, Outfielder)
- Lyndie Swanson (HBU, R-FR, Pitcher)
- Whitney Tate (MCNS, SO, Pitcher)
- Jasie Roberts (HBU, R-FR, Utility)

==== Second Team ====
- Haley Moore (TAMUCC, SO, 1st Base)
- Shelby Echols (HBU, SO, 2nd Base)
- Autumn Sydlik (HBU, JR, 3rd Base)
- Keely DuBois (NSU, SO, Shortstop)
- Bailey Krolczyk (SELA, SO, Catcher)
- Lexi Johnson (SELA, SO, Designated Player)
- Toni Perrin (MCNS, SR, Outfielder)
- Cam Goodman (SELA, SO, Outfielder)
- Alexandria Torres (TAMUCC, SO, Outfielder)
- Ashley Vallejo (MCNS, SO, Pitcher)
- Heather Zumo (SELA, SR, Pitcher)
- Beatriz Lara (TAMUCC, JR, Pitcher)
- Melise Gossen (NICH, JR, Utility)

=== National Softball Signing Day ===
| Player | Position | Hometown | Previous Team |
|---|---|---|---|
| Lainee Bailey | Pitcher | Walker, Louisiana | Walker HS |
| Cera Blanchard | Pitcher | Metairie, Louisiana | De La Salle HS; Copiah–Lincoln CC |
| Britt Bourgoyne | Utility | Port Allen, Louisiana | Brusly HS |
| Maria Detillier | Infielder | Gramercy, Louisiana | Lutcher HS |
| Mckayla Ferguson | Catcher | Plaquemine, Louisiana | Plaquemine HS |
| Jillian Gutierrez | Outfielder | Pearland, Texas | Shadow Creek HS |
| Madison Hebert | Infielder | Luling, Louisiana | St. Charles Catholic HS |
| Colleen Kulivan | Infielder | Covington, Louisiana | Covington HS |
| Maddie Leal | Outfielder | Spring, Texas | Spring HS; LSU Eunice |

== Personnel ==
2022 Southeastern Louisiana Lady Lions softball team
Players
Coaches

| # | Pos. | Name | Bats/throws | Height | Year | Home town |
|---|---|---|---|---|---|---|
| 0 | OF | Cam Goodman | / | 5 ft 1 in (1.55 m) | So | Marrero, Louisiana |
| 2 | U | Madison Rayner | / | 5 ft 3 in (1.6 m) | Jr | Stringer, Mississippi |
| 3 | INF | Lindsey Rizzo | / | 5 ft 4 in (1.63 m) | Jr | Watson, Louisiana |
| 4 | INF | Lexi Johnson | / | 5 ft 6 in (1.68 m) | So | Reserve, Louisiana |
| 5 | INF | Sarah Diaz | / | 5 ft 6 in (1.68 m) | Fr | Lafayette, Louisiana |
| 7 | INF | Maddie Watson | / | 5 ft 6 in (1.68 m) | Fr | Baton Rouge, Louisiana |
| 9 | C | Blaire Bizette | / | 5 ft 7 in (1.7 m) | Fr | New Roads, Louisiana |
| 10 | P | Mary-Cathryn Comeaux | / | 5 ft 5 in (1.65 m) | So | Port Allen, Louisiana |
| 11 | INF | Ellie DuBois | / | 6 ft 0 in (1.83 m) | So | Shreveport, Louisiana |
| 12 | OF | Audrey Greely | / | 5 ft 9 in (1.75 m) | So | Geismar, Louisiana |
| 15 | C | Bailey Krolczyk | / | 6 ft 2 in (1.88 m) | So | Corpus Christi, Texas |
| 16 | INF | Elise Jones | / | 5 ft 8 in (1.73 m) | Fr | Livingston, Louisiana |
| 17 | OF | Aeriyl Mass | / | 5 ft 1 in (1.55 m) | Sr | Lake Charles, Louisiana |
| 18 | P | Alexis Findley | / | 5 ft 9 in (1.75 m) | Fr | Jefferson City, Missouri |
| 19 | INF | Sadie Hewitt | / | 5 ft 6 in (1.68 m) | So | Forney, Texas |
| 20 | P | Alyssa Romano | / | 5 ft 7 in (1.7 m) | So | Gonzales, Louisiana |
| 21 | P | KK Ladner | / | 5 ft 8 in (1.73 m) | Jr | Kiln, Mississippi |
| 22 | P | Heather Zumo | / | 5 ft 7 in (1.7 m) | Sr | Baton Rouge, Louisiana |
| 24 | P | Leah Marshall | / | 5 ft 11 in (1.8 m) | Fr | Mississauga, Canada |
| 25 | C | Madisen Blackford | / | 5 ft 6 in (1.68 m) | Sr | Des Moines, Iowa |

Head coach

Rick Fremin (Jackson State)

Assistant coach(es)

Katie Godwin (Southeastern Louisiana)
Alana Fremin (Belhaven)

Legend

- (C) Team captain
- (S) Suspended
- (I) Ineligible
- Injured
- Current redshirt

Roster
Last update: 26 June 2022

== Schedule and results ==
Legend
| | Southeastern Louisiana win |
| | Southeastern Louisiana loss |
| | Postponement/Cancellation |
| **Bold** | Southeastern Louisiana team member |

2022 Southeastern Louisiana Lady Lions softball game log
Regular season (37–14)

February (10–3)
| Date | Opponent | Rank | Site/stadium | Score | Win | Loss | Save | TV | Attendance | Overall record | SLC record |
Lion Classic I
| Feb. 11 | Southeast Missouri State | | North Oak Park • Hammond, LA | **W** 6–2 | **Zumo** (1-0) | Davis (0-1) | None | ESPN+ | 329 | 1–0 | |
| Feb. 12 | Southeast Missouri State | | North Oak Park • Hammond, LA | **W** 6–5 | **Zumo** (2-0) | Rook (1-1) | None | | 263 | 2–0 | |
| Feb. 12 | Alabama A&M | | North Oak Park • Hammond, LA | **W** 12–5 | **Comeaux** (1-0) | Coe (1-2) | None | | 225 | 3–0 | |
Troy Cox Invitational
| Feb. 18 | vs. Northern Colorado | | NM State Softball Complex • Las Cruces, NM | **W** 7–6 | **Comeaux** (2-0) | Caviness (0-2) | None | | 167 | 4–0 | |
| Feb. 18 | vs. Nebraska | | NM State Softball Complex • Las Cruces, NM | **W** 2–0 | **Zumo** (3-0) | Ferrell (0-2) | **Comeaux** (1) | | 158 | 5–0 | |
| Feb. 19 | vs. UT Arlington | | NM State Softball Complex • Las Cruces, NM | **L** 1–5 | Adams (2-3) | **DuBois** (0-1) | None | | 173 | 5–1 | |
| Feb. 19 | vs. Northern Colorado | | NM State Softball Complex • Las Cruces, NM | **W** 6–0 | **Comeaux** (3-0) | Golden (1-3) | None | | 180 | 6–1 | |
| Feb. 20 | vs. Nebraska | | NM State Softball Complex • Las Cruces, NM | **L** 1–11 | Wallace (4-1) | **Comeaux** (3-1) | None | | 112 | 6–2 | |
Mardi Gras Mambo
| Feb. 25 | vs. Portland State | | Youngsville Sports Complex • Youngsville, LA | **W** 3–0 | **Zumo** (4-0) | Grey (3-1) | **DuBois** (1) | | 123 | 7–2 | |
| Feb. 25 | vs. No. 2 Alabama | | Youngsville Sports Complex • Youngsville, LA | **L** 0–5 | Fouts (4-0) | **Comeaux** (3-2) | None | | 245 | 7–3 | |
| Feb. 26 | vs. Lipscomb | | Youngsville Sports Complex • Youngsville, LA | **W** 9–0^{5} | **Zumo** (5-0) | Peters (0-1) | None | | 115 | 8–3 | |
| Feb. 26 | vs. Eastern Illinois | | Youngsville Sports Complex • Youngsville, LA | **W** 5–0 | **Ladner** (1-0) | Kaufman (0-1) | None | | 123 | 9–3 | |
| Feb. 27 | St. Thomas | | Youngsville Sports Complex • Youngsville, LA | **W** 8–0^{5} | **Comeaux** (4-2) | Baniecke (1-4) | None | | 120 | 10–3 | |

March (10–7)
| Date | Opponent | Rank | Site/stadium | Score | Win | Loss | Save | TV | Attendance | Overall record | SLC record |
|---|---|---|---|---|---|---|---|---|---|---|---|
| Mar. 2 | at Louisiana Tech | | Lady Techsters Softball Complex • Ruston, LA | **L** 1–2 | Menzina (1-1) | **Ladner** (0-2) | None | | | 10–4 | |
Lion Classic II
| Mar. 4 | Buffalo | | North Oak Park • Hammond, LA | **L** 2–5 | Tarantino (3-4) | **Comeaux** (4-3) | None | ESPN+ | 203 | 10–5 | |
| Mar. 4 | Marist | | North Oak Park • Hammond, LA | **W** 10–2^{5} | **Zumo** (6-0) | Pleasants (1-5) | None | ESPN+ | 197 | 11–5 | |
| Mar. 5 | Buffalo | | North Oak Park • Hammond, LA | **W** 8–0^{6} | **Zumo** (7-0) | Tarantino (3-5) | None | ESPN+ | 119 | 12–5 | |
| Mar. 5 | Marist | | North Oak Park • Hammond, LA | **L** 2–3 | Myers (3-0) | **Romano** (0-1) | None | ESPN+ | 161 | 12–6 | |
| Mar. 6 | Marist | | North Oak Park • Hammond, LA | **W** 4–2 | **Zumo** (8-0) | Pleasants (1-7) | **Ladner** (1) | ESPN+ | 137 | 13–6 | |
Memphis Tournament
| Mar. 10 | vs. Central Arkansas | | Tiger Softball Complex • Memphis, TN | **L** 1–6 | Johnson (4-6) | **Zumo** (8-1) | None | | 106 | 13–7 | |
| Mar. 11 | vs. South Dakota | | Tiger Softball Complex • Memphis, TN | **W** 13–5 | **Zumo** (9-1) | Edwards (7-4) | None | | | 14–7 | |
| Mar. 11 | at Memphis | | Tiger Softball Complex • Memphis, TN | Game cancelled | | | | | | | |
| Mar. 12 | vs. Central Arkansas | | Tiger Softball Complex • Memphis, TN | Game cancelled | | | | | | | |
| Mar. 12 | vs. No. 10 Oklahoma State | | Tiger Softball Complex • Memphis, TN | Game cancelled | | | | | | | |
| Mar. 15 | at No. 20 LSU | | Tiger Park • Baton Rouge, LA | **L** 2–11 | Chaffin (4-0) | **Zumo** (9-2) | None | SECN+ | 1,880 | 14–8 | |
| Mar. 16 | vs. Colgate | | Rudy Abbott Field • Jacksonville, AL | Game cancelled | | | | | | | |
| Mar. 17 | at Jacksonville State | | Rudy Abbott Field • Jacksonville, AL | **W** 8–5 | **Comeaux** (5-3) | Carter (8-5) | None | ESPN+ | 217 | 15–8 | |
UT Chattanooga Tournament
| Mar. 18 | vs. Bucknell | | Frost Stadium • Chattanooga, TN | **W** 5–4 | **Ladner** (2-1) | Toomey (3-8) | None | ESPN+ | 172 | 16–8 | |
| Mar. 19 | vs. Bucknell | | Frost Stadium • Chattanooga, TN | **W** 11–2^{5} | **Ladner** (3-1) | Vestal (0-1) | None | | 116 | 17–8 | |
| Mar. 19 | at Chattanooga | | Frost Stadium • Chattanooga, TN | **W** 11–5 | **Zumo** (10-2) | Alley (3-7) | None | ESPN+ | 271 | 18–8 | |
| Mar. 20 | at Chattanooga | | Frost Stadium • Chattanooga, TN | **L** 3–4 | Alley (4-7) | **Zumo** (10-3) | Wood (1) | ESPN+ | 317 | 18–9 | |
| Mar. 23 | at Louisiana–Monroe | | Geo-Surfaces Field at the ULM Softball Complex • Monroe, LA | **L** 0–4 | Kackley (5-2) | **Romano** (0-2) | None | | 382 | 18–10 | |
| Mar. 29 | Alcorn State | | North Oak Park • Hammond, LA | **W** 6–0 | **Findley** (1-0) | Veamoi (3-7) | None | | 151 | 19–10 | |
| Mar. 29 | Alcorn State | | North Oak Park • Hammond, LA | **W** 10–2 | **Comeaux** (6-3) | Parker (4-4) | None | | 281 | 20–10 | |

April (14–4)
| Date | Opponent | Rank | Site/stadium | Score | Win | Loss | Save | TV | Attendance | Overall record | SLC record |
|---|---|---|---|---|---|---|---|---|---|---|---|
| Apr. 1 | Incarnate Word | | North Oak Park • Hammond, LA | **W** 4–2 | **Comeaux** (7-3) | Trapp (3-5) | **Romano** (1) | ESPN+ | 210 | 21–10 | 1–0 |
| Apr. 1 | Incarnate Word | | North Oak Park • Hammond, LA | **W** 9–1^{6} | **Zumo** (11-3) | Floyd (2-3) | None | ESPN+ | 318 | 22–10 | 2–0 |
| Apr. 2 | Incarnate Word | | North Oak Park • Hammond, LA | **W** 7–3 | **Zumo** (12-3) | Garcia (1-8) | None | ESPN+ | 225 | 23–10 | 3–0 |
| Apr. 5 | Jackson State | | North Oak Park • Hammond, LA | **W** 5–1 | **Findley** (2-0) | Salazar (4-4) | None | ESPN+ | 130 | 24–10 | |
| Apr. 5 | Jackson State | | North Oak Park • Hammond, LA | **W** 9–0^{5} | **Comeaux** (8-3) | Hopson (0-3) | None | ESPN+ | 130 | 25–10 | |
| Apr. 8 | at McNeese State | | Joe Miller Field at Cowgirl Diamond • Lake Charles, LA | **W** 6–1 | **Zumo** (13-3) | Sanders (6-1) | None | ESPN+ | 417 | 26–10 | 4–0 |
| Apr. 9 | at McNeese State | | Joe Miller Field at Cowgirl Diamond • Lake Charles, LA | **L** 0–4 | Vallejo (9-6) | **Ladner** (3-2) | None | | 473 | 26–11 | 4–1 |
| Apr. 9 | at McNeese State | | Joe Miller Field at Cowgirl Diamond • Lake Charles, LA | **L** 3–9 | Tate (7-7) | **Findley** (2-1) | None | | 473 | 26–12 | 4–2 |
| Apr. 12 | Louisiana | | North Oak Park • Hammond, LA | Game cancelled | | | | | | | |
| Apr. 15 | at Nicholls | | Swanner Field at Geo Surfaces Park • Thibodaux, LA | **W** 10–4 | **Zumo** (14-3) | Lehman (5-11) | None | | 411 | 27–12 | 5–2 |
| Apr. 15 | at Nicholls | | Swanner Field at Geo Surfaces Park • Thibodaux, LA | **W** 11–2 | **Ladner** (4-2) | Turner (5-11) | None | | 287 | 28–12 | 6–2 |
| Apr. 16 | at Nicholls | | Swanner Field at Geo Surfaces Park • Thibodaux, LA | **W** 10–1 | **Ladner** (5-2) | Turner (5-12) | None | | 182 | 29–12 | 7–2 |
| Apr. 19 | at Southern | | Lady Jaguar Field • Baton Rouge, LA | **W** 13–0^{5} | **Comeaux** (9-3) | Corona (1-7) | None | | 134 | 30–12 | |
| Apr. 22 | Houston Baptist | | North Oak Park • Hammond, LA | **W** 5–0 | **Zumo** (15-3) | Swanson (6-7) | None | ESPN+ | 115 | 31–12 | 8–2 |
| Apr. 22 | Houston Baptist | | North Oak Park • Hammond, LA | **W** 14–6^{6} | **Ladner** (6-2) | Cotton (2-9) | None | ESPN+ | 115 | 32–12 | 9–2 |
| Apr. 23 | Houston Baptist | | North Oak Park • Hammond, LA | **W** 2–1 | **Zumo** (16-3) | Venker (1-7) | None | ESPN+ | 225 | 33–12 | 10–2 |
| Apr. 29 | at Texas A&M–Corpus Christi | | Chapman Field • Corpus Christi, TX | **L** 0–7 | Gilbert (7-8) | **Zumo** (16-4) | None | ESPN+ | 171 | 33–13 | 10–3 |
| Apr. 29 | at Texas A&M–Corpus Christi | | Chapman Field • Corpus Christi, TX | **W** 6–2 | **Ladner** (7-2) | Smith (4-8) | None | ESPN+ | 171 | 34–13 | 11–3 |
| Apr. 30 | at Texas A&M–Corpus Christi | | Chapman Field • Corpus Christi, TX | **L** 6–7 | Galvan (4-0) | **Ladner** (7-3) | None | | 282 | 34–14 | 11–4 |

May (3–0)
| Date | Opponent | Rank | Site/stadium | Score | Win | Loss | Save | TV | Attendance | Overall record | SLC record |
|---|---|---|---|---|---|---|---|---|---|---|---|
| May 6 | Northwestern State | | North Oak Park • Hammond, LA | **W** 7–3 | **Zumo** (17-4) | Hoover (10-6) | **DuBois** (2) | ESPN+ | 318 | 35–14 | 12–4 |
| May 6 | Northwestern State | | North Oak Park • Hammond, LA | **W** 8–0^{5} | **Comeaux** (10-3) | Rhoden (6-4) | None | ESPN+ | 318 | 36–14 | 13–4 |
| May 7 | Northwestern State | | North Oak Park • Hammond, LA | **W** 6–1 | **Zumo** (18-4) | Hoover (10-7) | None | ESPN+ | 294 | 37–14 | 14–4 |

Post-Season (3–2)

Southland Tournament (3–2)
| Date | Opponent | (Seed)/Rank | Site/stadium | Score | Win | Loss | Save | TV | Attendance | Overall record | Tournament record |
|---|---|---|---|---|---|---|---|---|---|---|---|
| May 10 | vs. (7) Nicholls | (2) | North Oak Park • Hammond, LA | **W** 10–2^{5} | **Zumo** (19-4) | Lehman (5-16) | None | ESPN+ | 336 | 38–14 | 1–0 |
| May 11 | vs. (6) Houston Baptist | (2) | North Oak Park • Hammond, LA | **W** 8–5 | **Zumo** (20-4) | Cotton (5-10) | None | ESPN+ | 361 | 39–14 | 2–0 |
| May 12 | vs. (1) McNeese State | (2) | North Oak Park • Hammond, LA | **L** 6–7^{8} | Tate (12-9) | **Zumo** (20-5) | None | ESPN+ | 381 | 39–15 | 2–1 |
| May 12 | vs. (6) Houston Baptist | (2) | North Oak Park • Hammond, LA | **W** 9–1^{5} | **Ladner** (8-3) | Swanson (9-8) | None | ESPN+ | 258 | 40–15 | 3–1 |
| May 13 | vs. (1) McNeese State | (2) | North Oak Park • Hammond, LA | **L** 4–10 | Sanders (7-2) | **Romano** (0-3) | None | ESPN+ | 331 | 40–16 | 3–2 |

Schedule source:*Rankings are based on the team's current ranking in the NFCA/USA Softball poll.
