= 2022 Northwestern State Lady Demons softball team =

American college softball season

2022 Northwestern State Lady Demons softball
- Conference: Southland Conference
- Record: 29–22 (10–8 Southland)
- Head coach: Donald Pickett (14th season)
- Assistant coach: Lexi Smith
- Home stadium: Lady Demon Diamond

2022 Southland Conference softball standings
	Conf.				Overall
Team	W		L	PCT	W		L	PCT
McNeese State ‍†‍‡‍^{y}	15	–	3	.833	40	–	21	.656
Southeastern Louisiana ‍‍‍	14	–	4	.778	40	–	16	.714
Texas A&M–Corpus Christi ‍‍‍	11	–	7	.611	25	–	27	.481
Northwestern State ‍‍‍	10	–	8	.556	29	–	22	.569
Incarnate Word ‍‍‍	5	–	13	.278	15	–	36	.294
Houston Baptist ‍‍‍	4	–	13	.235	19	–	29	.396
Nicholls ‍‍‍	4	–	14	.222	12	–	38	.240
† – Conference champion ‡ – Tournament champion y – Invited to the NCAA tournament As of June 5, 2022; Rankings from NFCA/USA Today

The 2022 Northwestern State Lady Demons softball team represented Northwestern State University during the 2022 NCAA Division I softball season. The Lady Demons played their home games at Lady Demon Diamond and were led by fourteenth year head coach Donald Pickett. They were members of the Southland Conference.

== Preseason ==
=== Southland Conference Coaches Poll ===
The Southland Conference Coaches Poll was released on February 4, 2022. Northwestern State was picked to finish second in the Southland Conference with 120 votes and 2 first place votes.

Coaches poll
Predicted finish	Team	Votes (1st place)
1	McNeese State	132 (12)
2	Northwestern State	120 (2)
3	Southeastern Louisiana	113
4	Houston Baptist	102
5	Incarnate Word	84
6	Texas A&M–Corpus Christi	82
7	Nicholls	81

=== Preseason All-Southland team ===
==== First Team ====
- Caitlyn Brockway (HBU, JR, 1st Base)
- Cayla Jones (NSU, SR, 2nd Base)
- Lindsey Rizzo (SELA, SR, 3rd Base)
- Ashleigh Sgambelluri (TAMUCC, JR, Shortstop)
- Chloe Gomez (MCNS, SO, Catcher)
- Kaylee Lopez (MCNS, JR, Designated Player)
- Jil Poullard (MCNS, SO, Outfielder)
- Audrey Greely (SELA, SO, Outfielder)
- Aeriyl Mass (SELA, SR, Outfielder)
- Pal Egan (TAMUCC, JR, Outfielder)
- Lyndie Swanson (HBU, R-FR, Pitcher)
- Whitney Tate (MCNS, SO, Pitcher)
- Jasie Roberts (HBU, R-FR, Utility)

==== Second Team ====
- Haley Moore (TAMUCC, SO, 1st Base)
- Shelby Echols (HBU, SO, 2nd Base)
- Autumn Sydlik (HBU, JR, 3rd Base)
- Keely DuBois (NSU, SO, Shortstop)
- Bailey Krolczyk (SELA, SO, Catcher)
- Lexi Johnson (SELA, SO, Designated Player)
- Toni Perrin (MCNS, SR, Outfielder)
- Cam Goodman (SELA, SO, Outfielder)
- Alexandria Torres (TAMUCC, SO, Outfielder)
- Ashley Vallejo (MCNS, SO, Pitcher)
- Heather Zumo (SELA, SR, Pitcher)
- Beatriz Lara (TAMUCC, JR, Pitcher)
- Melise Gossen (NICH, JR, Utility)

=== National Softball Signing Day ===
Player	Position	Hometown	Previous Team
Camryn Ford	Outfielder	Many, Louisiana	Many HS
Ryleigh Denton	Pitcher	Rotan, Texas	Rotan HS; Tyler JC

== Personnel ==
2022 Northwestern State Lady Demons softball team
Players
Coaches

#	Pos.	Name	Bats/throws	Height	Year	Home town
0	OF	Vivica Hernandez	L/L	5 ft 5 in (1.65 m)	Fr	Fort Worth, Texas
1	INF	Carson Zachary	R/R	5 ft 6 in (1.68 m)	Fr	Mount Pleasant, Texas
2	INF	Cayla Jones	L/R	5 ft 2 in (1.57 m)	Sr	Missouri City, Texas
4	INF	Maggie Black	R/R	5 ft 7 in (1.7 m)	Jr	Grapevine, Texas
6	OF	Makenzie Chaffin	L/R	5 ft 8 in (1.73 m)	So	Bossier City, Louisiana
7	RHP	Bronte Rhoden	R/R	5 ft 7 in (1.7 m)	Jr	Plano, Texas
9	OF	Laney Roos	L/L	5 ft 7 in (1.7 m)	So	Aubrey, Texas
10	RHP	Sage Hoover	R/R	5 ft 8 in (1.73 m)	Fr	Edgewood, Texas
11	RHP	Kenzie Seely	R/R	5 ft 5 in (1.65 m)	So	Whitney, Texas
12	INF	Taylor Williams	L/R	5 ft 3 in (1.6 m)	So	Tom Bean, Texas
13	C	Tristin Court	R/R	6 ft 0 in (1.83 m)	So	Rockwall, Texas
14	INF	Keely DuBois	R/R	5 ft 9 in (1.75 m)	So	Robeline, Louisiana
15	RHP	Nana Vences	R/R	5 ft 10 in (1.78 m)	Fr	Marshall, Texas
17	INF	Kat Marshall	R/R	5 ft 9 in (1.75 m)	So	Brenham, Texas
18	RHP	Heather Zook (redshirt)	R/R	5 ft 4 in (1.63 m)	Fr	Diana, Texas
22	OF	Bailie Ragsdale	L/R	5 ft 5 in (1.65 m)	Fr	Lone Oak, Texas
23	OF	Nani Winger (redshirt)	R/R	5 ft 8 in (1.73 m)	Fr	Friendswood, Texas
24	RHP	Haley Parker	R/R	5 ft 11 in (1.8 m)	Fr	Fort Worth, Texas
27	C	Derika Castillo	R/R	5 ft 5 in (1.65 m)	Fr	Houston, Texas
28	RHP	Maggie Darr (redshirt)	R/R	6 ft 3 in (1.91 m)	Fr	Missouri City, Texas
33	C	Lexie Roos	R/R	5 ft 8 in (1.73 m)	So	Aubrey, Texas
42	C	Alexis Perry	R/R	5 ft 9 in (1.75 m)	Jr	Wylie, Texas
44	OF	Casey Irvin	R/R	5 ft 6 in (1.68 m)	Jr	Houston, Texas

Head coach

Donald Pickett (UT Chattanooga)

Assistant coach(es)

Lexi Smith (Texas A&M)

Legend

- (C) Team captain
- (S) Suspended
- (I) Ineligible
- Injured
- Current redshirt

Roster
Last update: 27 June 2022

== Schedule and results ==
Legend
	Northwestern State win
	Northwestern State loss
	Postponement/Cancellation
**Bold**	Northwestern State team member

2022 Northwestern State Lady Demons softball game log
Regular season (28–20)

February (9–6)
Date	Opponent	Rank	Site/stadium	Score	Win	Loss	Save	TV	Attendance	Overall record	SLC record
Natchitoches Historic District Development Commission Lady Demon Classic
Feb. 11	Chattanooga		Lady Demon Diamond • Natchitoches, LA	**W** 1–0	**Hoover** (1-0)	Parrott (0-1)	None		325	1–0	
Feb. 11	Arkansas–Pine Bluff		Lady Demon Diamond • Natchitoches, LA	**W** 4–0	**Darr** (1-0)	Green (0-1)	None		410	2–0	
Feb. 12	UT Martin		Lady Demon Diamond • Natchitoches, LA	**W** 1–0	**Seely** (1-0)	Groet (1-1)	**Hoover** (1)		308	3–0	
Feb. 12	Baylor		Lady Demon Diamond • Natchitoches, LA	**L** 0–5	Binford (1-0)	**Rhoden** (0-1)	None		404	3–1	
Feb. 13	Chattanooga		Lady Demon Diamond • Natchitoches, LA	Game cancelled							
Feb. 16	at Louisiana Tech		Lady Techsters Softball Complex • Ruston, LA	**W** 3–2	**Hoover** (2-0)	Pickett (2-1)	**Seely** (1)		540	4–1	
Chattanooga Challenge
Feb. 18	vs. Tennessee Tech		Frost Stadium • Chattanooga, TN	**L** 0–5	Bryson (2-0)	**Rhoden** (0-2)	None		21	4–2	
Feb. 18	at Chattanooga		Frost Stadium • Chattanooga, TN	**W** 3–1	**Seely** (2-0)	Alley (0-2)	**Hoover** (2)		187	5–2	
Feb. 19	vs. Purdue Fort Wayne		Frost Stadium • Chattanooga, TN	**W** 3–0	**Darr** (2-0)	Johnson (0-2)	None		120	6–2	
Feb. 19	SIU Edwardsville		Frost Stadium • Chattanooga, TN	**L** 4–5^{8}	Haynes (2-3)	**Hoover** (2-1)	None		47	6–3	
Feb. 20	vs. Indiana State		Frost Stadium • Chattanooga, TN	**L** 1–2	Adamson (2-0)	**Seely** (2-1)	Benko (1)		62	6–4	
Mardi Gras Mambo
Feb. 25	vs. Lipscomb		Youngsville Sports Complex • Youngsville, LA	**W** 2–0	**Seely** (3-1)	Veneziale (1-3)	None		106	7–4	
Feb. 25	vs. Eastern Illinois		Youngsville Sports Complex • Youngsville, LA	**W** 7–5	**Darr** (3-0)	Morio (1-2)	**Hoover** (3)		100	8–4	
Feb. 26	vs. No. 2 Alabama		Youngsville Sports Complex • Youngsville, LA	**L** 3–8	Fouts (5-0)	**Hoover** (2-2)	None			8–5	
Feb. 26	vs. St. Thomas		Youngsville Sports Complex • Youngsville, LA	**W** 5–3	**Darr** (4-0)	True (0-2)	**Hoover** (4)		48	9–5	
Feb. 27	vs. Portland State		Youngsville Sports Complex • Youngsville, LA	**L** 7–9	Frost (3-1)	**Rhoden** (0-3)	None		80	9–6	

March (12–6)
Date	Opponent	Rank	Site/stadium	Score	Win	Loss	Save	TV	Attendance	Overall record	SLC record
Mar. 1	Grambling State		Lady Demon Diamond • Natchitoches, LA	**W** 8–1	**Darr** (5-0)	Shells (0-1)	None		109	10–6	
Boerner Invitational
Mar. 4	vs. Fordham		Allan Saxe Field • Arlington, TX	**W** 6–1	**Hoover** (3-2)	Miller (1-4)	None		156	11–6	
Mar. 4	vs. UTSA		Allan Saxe Field • Arlington, TX	**L** 2–3	Estell (2-4)	**Darr** (5-1)	None		156	11–7	
Mar. 5	vs. Fordham		Allan Saxe Field • Arlington, TX	**L** 3–5	Watkins (1-0)	**Seely** (3-2)	None		156	11–8	
Mar. 5	vs. UTSA		Allan Saxe Field • Arlington, TX	**W** 5–0	**Hoover** (4-2)	Williams (0-4)	None		156	12–8	
Mar. 12	at Houston		Cougar Softball Stadium • Houston, TX	**L** 2–7	Todd (3-2)	**Hoover** (4-3)	Wilkey (2)	ESPN+	281	12–9	
Mar. 12	at Houston		Cougar Softball Stadium • Houston, TX	**L** 3–5	Wilkey (5-4)	**Darr** (5-2)	None	ESPN+	281	12–10	
Mar. 13	at Houston		Cougar Softball Stadium • Houston, TX	**L** 0–5	Flores (2-4)	**Seely** (3-3)	None	ESPN+	339	12–11	
Mar. 16	at Jackson State		JSU Softball Field • Jackson, MS	**W** 7–3	**Hoover** (5-3)	Hill (3-4)	None		18	13–11	
Mar. 16	at Jackson State		JSU Softball Field • Jackson, MS	**W** 3–2	**Rhoden** (1-3)	Hopson (0-1)	**Darr** (1)		22	14–11	
Tiger Classic
Mar. 18	vs. James Madison		Tigers Softball Complex • Memphis, TN	**W** 8–6^{9}	**Darr** (6-2)	Humphrey (0-1)	**Hoover** (5)			15–11	
Mar. 18	vs. East Tennessee State		Tiger Softball Complex • Memphis, TN	**W** 7–1	**Rhoden** (2-3)	Tucker (0-1)	None			16–11	
Mar. 19	vs. East Tennessee State		Tiger Softball Complex • Memphis, TN	**W** 9–1^{5}	**Darr** (7-2)	Arnott (0-7)	None		61	17–11	
Mar. 19	at Memphis		Tiger Softball Complex • Memphis, TN	**L** 4–9	Siems (6-8)	**Seely** (3-4)	None		309	17–12	
Mar. 23	UT Arlington		Lady Demon Diamond • Natchitoches, LA	Game cancelled							
Mar. 25	at Houston Baptist		Husky Field • Houston, TX	**W** 5–1	**Hoover** (6-3)	Swanson (4-3)	None	ESPN+	288	18–12	1–0
Mar. 25	at Houston Baptist		Husky Field • Houston, TX	**W** 10–2	**Darr** (8-2)	Cotton (2-4)	None	ESPN+	288	19–12	2–0
Mar. 26	at Houston Baptist		Husky Field • Houston, TX	**W** 7–1	**Rhoden** (3-3)	Venker (1-5)	None	ESPN+	279	20–12	3–0
Mar. 29	Louisiana Tech		Lady Demon Diamond • Natchitoches, LA	**W** 6–2	**Hoover** (7-3)	Hutchinson (5-5)	None		276	21–12	

April (7–5)
Date	Opponent	Rank	Site/stadium	Score	Win	Loss	Save	TV	Attendance	Overall record	SLC record
Apr. 1	Nicholls		Lady Demon Diamond • Natchitoches, LA	**W** 1–0	**Hoover** (8-3)	Lehman (4-8)	None		225	22–12	4–0
Apr. 1	Nicholls		Lady Demon Diamond • Natchitoches, LA	**W** 4–3^{8}	**Rhoden** (4-3)	Westbrook (0-3)	None		204	23–12	5–0
Apr. 2	Nicholls		Lady Demon Diamond • Natchitoches, LA	**L** 4–5	Lehman (5-8)	**Hoover** (8-4)	None		201	23–13	5–1
Apr. 8	at Texas A&M–Corpus Christi		Chapman Field • Corpus Christi, TX	**W** 2–1^{12}	**Hoover** (9-4)	Gilbert (3-8)	None		153	24–13	6–1
Apr. 8	at Texas A&M–Corpus Christi		Chapman Field • Corpus Christi, TX	**L** 3–4	McNeill (2-1)	**Seely** (3-5)	None		168	24–14	6–2
Apr. 9	at Texas A&M–Corpus Christi		Chapman Field • Corpus Christi, TX	**L** 1–5	Smith (4-6)	**Darr** (8-3)	None		207	24–15	6–3
Apr. 14	McNeese State		Lady Demon Diamond • Natchitoches, LA	**L** 0–1	Vallejo (10-6)	**Hoover** (9-5)	None		228	24–16	6–4
Apr. 15	McNeese State		Lady Demon Diamond • Natchitoches, LA	**L** 2–3	Tate (8-7)	**Seely** (3-6)	Vallejo (1)		237	24–17	6–5
Apr. 15	McNeese State		Lady Demon Diamond • Natchitoches, LA	**W** 8–3	**Rhoden** (5-3)	Sanders (6-2)	None		244	25–17	7–5
Apr. 19	at Grambling State		GSU Softball Complex • Grambling, LA	Game cancelled							
Apr. 22	Incarnate Word		Lady Demon Diamond • Natchitoches, LA	**W** 1–0	**Hoover** (10-5)	Trapp (4-7)	None		204	26–17	8–5
Apr. 22	Incarnate Word		Lady Demon Diamond • Natchitoches, LA	**W** 5–3	**Darr** (9-3)	Floyd (2-5)	None		185	27–17	9–5
Apr. 23	Incarnate Word		Lady Demon Diamond • Natchitoches, LA	**W** 2–0	**Rhoden** (6-3)	Myers (3-4)	None		209	28–17	10–5

May (0–3)
Date	Opponent	Rank	Site/stadium	Score	Win	Loss	Save	TV	Attendance	Overall record	SLC record
May 6	at Southeastern Louisiana		North Oak Park • Hammond, LA	**L** 3–7	Zumo (17-4)	**Hoover** (10-6)	DuBois (2)		318	28–18	10–6
May 6	at Southeastern Louisiana		North Oak Park • Hammond, LA	**L** 0–8^{5}	Comeaux (10-3)	**Rhoden** (6-4)	None		318	28–19	10–7
May 7	at Southeastern Louisiana		North Oak Park • Hammond, LA	**L** 1–6	Zumo (18-4)	**Hoover** (10-7)	None		294	28–20	10–8

Post-Season (1–2)

Southland Tournament (1–2)
Date	Opponent	(Seed)/Rank	Site/stadium	Score	Win	Loss	Save	TV	Attendance	Overall record	Tournament record
May 10	vs. (5) Incarnate Word	(4)	North Oak Park • Hammond, LA	**W** 4–3	**Hoover** (11-7)	Trapp (6-9)	None	ESPN+	191	29–20	1–0
May 11	vs. (1) McNeese State	(4)	North Oak Park • Hammond, LA	**L** 5–6^{8}	Vallejo (17-7)	**Rhoden** (6-5)	None	ESPN+	267	29–21	1–1
May 12	vs. (3) Texas A&M–Corpus Christi	(4)	North Oak Park • Hammond, LA	**L** 3–4	Smith (5-9)	**Seely** (4-6)	Gilbert (2)	ESPN+	242	29–22	1–2

Schedule source:

*Rankings are based on the team's current ranking in the NFCA/USA Softball poll.
