= 2022 McNeese State Cowgirls softball team =

American college softball season

2022 McNeese State Cowgirls softball

Southland Conference Tournament champions Southland Conference Regular season champion

NCAA Evanston Regional, 2–2
- Conference: Southland Conference
- Record: 40–21 (15–3 Southland)
- Head coach: James Landreneau (6th season)
- Assistant coaches: Shellie Landry; Alyssa Denham
- Home stadium: Joe Miller Field at Cowgirl Diamond

2022 Southland Conference softball standings
	Conf.				Overall
Team	W		L	PCT	W		L	PCT
McNeese State ‍†‍‡‍^{y}	15	–	3	.833	40	–	21	.656
Southeastern Louisiana ‍‍‍	14	–	4	.778	40	–	16	.714
Texas A&M–Corpus Christi ‍‍‍	11	–	7	.611	25	–	27	.481
Northwestern State ‍‍‍	10	–	8	.556	29	–	22	.569
Incarnate Word ‍‍‍	5	–	13	.278	15	–	36	.294
Houston Baptist ‍‍‍	4	–	13	.235	19	–	29	.396
Nicholls ‍‍‍	4	–	14	.222	12	–	38	.240
† – Conference champion ‡ – Tournament champion y – Invited to the NCAA tournament As of June 5, 2022; Rankings from NFCA/USA Today

The 2022 McNeese State Cowgirls softball team represented McNeese State University during the 2022 NCAA Division I softball season. The Cowgirls played their home games at Joe Miller Field at Cowgirl Diamond and were led by sixth-year head coach James Landreneau. They were members of the Southland Conference.

== Preseason ==
=== Southland Conference Coaches Poll ===
The Southland Conference Coaches Poll was released on February 4, 2022. McNeese State was picked to finish first in the Southland Conference with 132 votes and 12 first place votes.

Coaches poll
Predicted finish	Team	Votes (1st place)
1	McNeese State	132 (12)
2	Northwestern State	120 (2)
3	Southeastern Louisiana	113
4	Houston Baptist	102
5	Incarnate Word	84
6	Texas A&M–Corpus Christi	82
7	Nicholls	81

=== Preseason All-Southland team ===
==== First Team ====
- Caitlyn Brockway (HBU, JR, 1st Base)
- Cayla Jones (NSU, SR, 2nd Base)
- Lindsey Rizzo (SELA, SR, 3rd Base)
- Ashleigh Sgambelluri (TAMUCC, JR, Shortstop)
- Chloe Gomez (MCNS, SO, Catcher)
- Kaylee Lopez (MCNS, JR, Designated Player)
- Jil Poullard (MCNS, SO, Outfielder)
- Audrey Greely (SELA, SO, Outfielder)
- Aeriyl Mass (SELA, SR, Outfielder)
- Pal Egan (TAMUCC, JR, Outfielder)
- Lyndie Swanson (HBU, R-FR, Pitcher)
- Whitney Tate (MCNS, SO, Pitcher)
- Jasie Roberts (HBU, R-FR, Utility)

==== Second Team ====
- Haley Moore (TAMUCC, SO, 1st Base)
- Shelby Echols (HBU, SO, 2nd Base)
- Autumn Sydlik (HBU, JR, 3rd Base)
- Keely DuBois (NSU, SO, Shortstop)
- Bailey Krolczyk (SELA, SO, Catcher)
- Lexi Johnson (SELA, SO, Designated Player)
- Toni Perrin (MCNS, SR, Outfielder)
- Cam Goodman (SELA, SO, Outfielder)
- Alexandria Torres (TAMUCC, SO, Outfielder)
- Ashley Vallejo (MCNS, SO, Pitcher)
- Heather Zumo (SELA, SR, Pitcher)
- Beatriz Lara (TAMUCC, JR, Pitcher)
- Melise Gossen (NICH, JR, Utility)

=== National Softball Signing Day ===
Player	Position	Hometown	Previous team
Grace Janik	Infielder/Outfielder	Missouri City, Texas	Ridge Point HS
Brooke Otto	Outfielder	Smithville, Texas	Smithville HS
Lindsay Davis	Pitcher	Troup, Texas	Troup HS
Jada McKelvey-Muñoz	Infielder	San Antonio, Texas	Sandra Day O'Connor HS
Reese Reyna	Infielder	Santa Fe, Texas	Santa Fe HS
Rylee Eyster	Outfielder	Southaven, Mississippi	Hernando HS
Delaney Dunham	Outfielder	Mont Belvieu, Texas	Barbers Hill HS
Makynlie Jones	Infielder	Vardaman, Mississippi	Vardaman HS
Ryann Schexnayder	Pitcher	Walker, Louisiana	Walker HS

== Personnel ==
2022 McNeese State Cowgirls softball team
Players
Coaches

#	Pos.	Name	Bats/throws	Height	Year	Home town
3	RHP	Ashley Vallejo	R/R	5 ft 7 in (1.7 m)	Jr	New Waverly, Texas
4	U	Kaylee Lopez	L/L	5 ft 5 in (1.65 m)	Sr	Indian Bayou, Louisiana
5	RHP	Whitney Tate	L/R	5 ft 7 in (1.7 m)	Jr	Columbia, Louisiana
6	OF	Erin Ardoin	L/R	5 ft 6 in (1.68 m)	So	Moss Bluff, Louisiana
9	INF	Caleigh Cross	L/R	5 ft 9 in (1.75 m)	Jr	Forney, Texas
14	INF	Crislyne Moreno	R/R	5 ft 9 in (1.75 m)	So	Converse, Texas
15	OF	Kendall Talley	L/R	5 ft 7 in (1.7 m)	Sr	San Antonio, Texas
20	RHP	Olivia Johnson	R/R	5 ft 7 in (1.7 m)	Jr	Bentley, Louisiana
21	U	Jil Poullard	L/R	5 ft 5 in (1.65 m)	Jr	Moss Bluff, Louisiana
22	INF	Reese Reyna	R/R	5 ft 3 in (1.6 m)	So	Santa Fe, Texas
24	LHP	Shaelyn Sanders	R/L	5 ft 5 in (1.65 m)	Jr	Splendora, Texas
25	C	Chloe Gomez	R/R	5 ft 3 in (1.6 m)	Jr	Spring, Texas
26	C	Kelsey Gaspard (redshirt)	R/R	5 ft 4 in (1.63 m)	Fr	Roanoke, Louisiana
27	LHP	Amanda Allen (redshirt)	R/L	5 ft 9 in (1.75 m)	Fr	Richmond, Texas
28	OF	Alayis Seneca	L/R	5 ft 8 in (1.73 m)	Sr	The Woodlands, Texas

Head coach

James Landreneau (McNeese State)

Assistant coach(es)

Shellie Landry (Louisiana)
Alyssa Denham (Arizona)
Cori McCrary (McNeese State)

Legend

- (C) Team captain
- (S) Suspended
- (I) Ineligible
- Injured
- Current redshirt

Roster
Last update: 18 June 2022

== Schedule and results ==
Legend
	McNeese State win
	McNeese State loss
	Postponement/Cancellation
**Bold**	McNeese State team member

2022 McNeese State Cowgirls softball game log
Regular season (35–19)

February (8–6)
Date	Opponent	Rank	Site/stadium	Score	Win	Loss	Save	TV	Attendance	Overall record	SLC Record
The Evangeline Bank and Trust Invitational I
Feb. 11	Texas Southern		Joe Miller Field at Cowgirl Diamond • Lake Charles, LA	**W** 11–4	**Johnson** (1-0)	Gendorf (0-1)	None		564	1–0	
Feb. 12	Tulsa		Joe Miller Field at Cowgirl Diamond • Lake Charles, LA	**W** 6–0	**Vallejo** (1-0)	Pochop (0-1)	None			2–0	
Feb. 12	UAB		Joe Miller Field at Cowgirl Diamond • Lake Charles, LA	**W** 4–3^{9}	**Sanders** (1-0)	Tindell (0-1)	None		612	3–0	
Feb. 13	North Texas		Joe Miller Field at Cowgirl Diamond • Lake Charles, LA	**W** 1–0	**Vallejo** (2-0)	Peters (1-1)	None			4–0	
Feb. 13	Texas Southern		Joe Miller Field at Cowgirl Diamond • Lake Charles, LA	**W** 7–0	**Tate** (1-0)	Reyes (0-2)	None		313	5–0	
Feb. 16	at No. 11 Texas		Red and Charline McCombs Field • Austin, TX	**L** 4–8	Simpson (1-0)	**Vallejo** (2-1)	None	LHN	894	5–1	
Houston Classic
Feb. 18	vs. No. 1 Oklahoma		Cougar Softball Stadium • Houston, TX	**L** 1–15^{5}	Bahl (3-0)	**Tate** (1-1)	None			5–2	
Feb. 18	at Houston		Cougar Softball Stadium • Houston, TX	**W** 8–5	**Vallejo** (3-1)	Wilkey (2-1)	None	ESPN+	728	6–2	
Feb. 19	vs. Texas State		Cougar Softball Stadium • Houston, TX	**L** 3–5	Pierce (2-1)	**Tate** (1-2)	None			6–3	
Feb. 19	vs. No. 1 Oklahoma		Cougar Softball Stadium • Houston, TX	**L** 0–11^{5}	Trautwein (3-0)	**Vallejo** (3-2)	None			6–4	
The Evangeline Bank and Trust Invitational II
Feb. 24	Sam Houston State		Joe Miller Field at Cowgirl Diamond • Lake Charles, LA	**L** 0–1	Wasik (2-0)	**Vallejo** (3-2)	None		177	6–5	
Feb. 25	UNLV		Joe Miller Field at Cowgirl Diamond • Lake Charles, LA	**L** 0–3	Bressler (5-0)	**Tate** (1-3)	None		473	6–6	
Feb. 26	Manhattan		Joe Miller Field at Cowgirl Diamond • Lake Charles, LA	**W** 12–0^{5}	**Sanders** (2-0)	Metzger (0-1)	None		473	7–6	
Feb. 26	Memphis		Joe Miller Field at Cowgirl Diamond • Lake Charles, LA	**W** 3–1	**Vallejo** (4-3)	Siems (2-3)	None		473	8–6	
Feb. 27	UT Arlington		Joe Miller Field at Cowgirl Diamond • Lake Charles, LA	Game postponed							

March (9–8)
Date	Opponent	Rank	Site/stadium	Score	Win	Loss	Save	TV	Attendance	Overall record	SLC Record
Mar. 1	Louisiana Tech		Joe Miller Field at Cowgirl Diamond • Lake Charles, LA	**L** 1–6	Pickett (7-2)	**Tate** (1-4)	None		456	8–7	
Mar. 4	Tarleton State		Joe Miller Field at Cowgirl Diamond • Lake Charles, LA	**L** 4–5	Ferguson (3-0)	**Vallejo** (4-4)	None		465	8–8	
Mar. 5	Tarleton State		Joe Miller Field at Cowgirl Diamond • Lake Charles, LA	**W** 3–2	**Tate** (2-4)	Mayo (1-2)	None		456	9–8	
Mar. 8	Tarleton State		Joe Miller Field at Cowgirl Diamond • Lake Charles, LA	**W** 8–1	**Vallejo** (5-4)	Ellett (1-2)	None		456	10–8	
Mar. 9	at No. 22 Louisiana		Yvette Girouard Field at Lamson Park • Lafayette, LA	**L** 3–5	Lamb (4-2)	**Vallejo** (5-5)	None		1,772	10–9	
Mar. 11	Boise State		Joe Miller Field at Cowgirl Diamond • Lake Charles, LA	**L** 1–4	Bailey (7-1)	**Tate** (2-5)	None		406	10–10	
Mar. 12	Boise State		Joe Miller Field at Cowgirl Diamond • Lake Charles, LA	**L** 4–7	Caudill (7-3)	**Johnson** (1-1)	None		447	10–11	
Mar. 12	Boise State		Joe Miller Field at Cowgirl Diamond • Lake Charles, LA	**L** 1–4	Bailey (8-1)	**Tate** (2-6)	None		447	10–12	
Mar. 16	Southern		Joe Miller Field at Cowgirl Diamond • Lake Charles, LA	**W** 14–1^{5}	**Sanders** (3-0)	Corona (0-5)	None		534	11–12	
Mar. 18	at Baylor		Getterman Stadium • Waco, TX	**L** 2–5	Orme (5-6)	**Tate** (2-7)	None	ESPN+	695	11–13	
Mar. 19	at Baylor		Getterman Stadium • Waco, TX	**W** 5–4	**Sanders** (4-0)	West (3-1)	None	ESPN+	793	12–13	
Mar. 19	at Baylor		Getterman Stadium • Waco, TX	**L** 0–3	Binford (5-2)	**Vallejo** (5-6)	None	ESPN+	793	12–14	
Mar. 23	Southern Miss		Joe Miller Field at Cowgirl Diamond • Lake Charles, LA	**W** 8–5	**Sanders** (5-0)	Kilgore (2-2)	None	ESPN+	423	13–14	
Mar. 25	at Texas A&M–Corpus Christi		Chapman Field • Corpus Christi, TX	**W** 5–4^{10}	**Vallejo** (6-6)	Gilbert (2-5)	None	ESPN+	159	14–14	1–0
Mar. 25	at Texas A&M–Corpus Christi		Chapman Field • Corpus Christi, TX	**W** 9–0^{5}	**Tate** (3-7)	Smith (2-6)	None	ESPN+	159	15–14	2–0
Mar. 26	at Texas A&M–Corpus Christi		Chapman Field • Corpus Christi, TX	**W** 9–3	**Vallejo** (7-6)	Gilbert (2-6)	None		259	16–14	3–0
Mar. 29	Louisiana–Monroe		Joe Miller Field at Cowgirl Diamond • Lake Charles, LA	**W** 7–5	**Tate** (4-7)	Abrams (5-2)	**Sanders** (1)		436	17–14	
Mar. 30	at No. 20 LSU		Tiger Park • Baton Rouge, LA	Game postponed							

April (16–5)
Date	Opponent	Rank	Site/stadium	Score	Win	Loss	Save	TV	Attendance	Overall record	SLC Record
Apr. 1	Houston Baptist		Joe Miller Field at Cowgirl Diamond • Lake Charles, LA	**W** 1–0 (by forfeit)							4–0
Apr. 3	Houston Baptist		Joe Miller Field at Cowgirl Diamond • Lake Charles, LA	**W** 9–1^{6}	**Sanders** (6-0)	Cotton (2-5)	None		411	18–14	5–0
Apr. 3	Houston Baptist		Joe Miller Field at Cowgirl Diamond • Lake Charles, LA	**W** 9–1^{5}	**Vallejo** (8-6)	Swanson (4-3)	None		411	19–14	6–0
Apr. 4	Arkansas–Pine Bluff		Joe Miller Field at Cowgirl Diamond • Lake Charles, LA	**W** 13–1^{5}	**Tate** (5-7)	Hubbard (0-5)	None		376	20–14	
Apr. 4	Arkansas–Pine Bluff		Joe Miller Field at Cowgirl Diamond • Lake Charles, LA	**W** 16–1^{5}	**Johnson** (2-1)	Schmidt (1-8)	None		376	21–14	
Apr. 6	Louisiana		Joe Miller Field at Cowgirl Diamond • Lake Charles, LA	**W** 6–5^{13}	**Tate** (6-7)	Schorman (6-4)	None	ESPN+	560	22–14	
Apr. 8	Southeastern Louisiana		Joe Miller Field at Cowgirl Diamond • Lake Charles, LA	**L** 1–6	Zumo (13-3)	**Sanders** (6-1)	None		417	22–15	6–1
Apr. 9	Southeastern Louisiana		Joe Miller Field at Cowgirl Diamond • Lake Charles, LA	**W** 4–0	**Vallejo** (9-6)	Ladner (3-2)	None		473	23–15	7–1
Apr. 9	Southeastern Louisiana		Joe Miller Field at Cowgirl Diamond • Lake Charles, LA	**W** 9–3	**Tate** (7-7)	Findley (2-1)	None		473	24–15	8–1
Apr. 12	Houston		Joe Miller Field at Cowgirl Diamond • Lake Charles, LA	Game postponed							
Apr. 14	at Northwestern State		Lady Demon Diamond • Natchitoches, LA	**W** 1–0	**Vallejo** (10-6)	Hoover (9-5)	None		228	25–15	9–1
Apr. 15	at Northwestern State		Lady Demon Diamond • Natchitoches, LA	**W** 3–2	**Tate** (8-7)	Seely (3-6)	**Vallejo** (1)		237	26–15	10–1
Apr. 15	at Northwestern State		Lady Demon Diamond • Natchitoches, LA	**L** 3–8	Rhoden (5-3)	**Sanders** (6-2)	None		244	26–16	10–2
Apr. 19	No. 21 LSU		Joe Miller Field at Cowgirl Diamond • Lake Charles, LA	**L** 1–7	Chaffin (6-2)	**Vallejo** (10-7)	None		1,150	26–17	
Apr. 22	at Lamar		Lamar Softball Complex • Beaumont, TX	**W** 6–2	**Tate** (9-7)	Ruiz (7-13)	**Sanders** (2)		504	27–17	
Apr. 23	Lamar		Joe Miller Field at Cowgirl Diamond • Lake Charles, LA	**W** 8–1	**Vallejo** (11-7)	Ruiz (7-14)	None	ESPN+	375	28–17	
Apr. 23	Lamar		Joe Miller Field at Cowgirl Diamond • Lake Charles, LA	**W** 7–3	**Tate** (10-7)	Ruiz (7-15)	None		375	29–17	
Apr. 26	at No. 19 LSU		Tiger Park • Baton Rouge, LA	**L** 1–10^{5}	Sunseri (7-7)	**Tate** (10-8)	None		1,756	29–18	
Apr. 27	Louisiana–Monroe		Geo-Surfaces Field at the ULM Softball Complex • Monroe, LA	**W** 3–0	**Vallejo** (12-7)	Abrams (7-6)	None	ESPN+	325	30–18	
Apr. 29	Incarnate Word		Joe Miller Field at Cowgirl Diamond • Lake Charles, LA	**W** 9–0^{5}	**Vallejo** (13-7)	Trapp (4-8)	None	ESPN+	447	31–18	11–2
Apr. 30	Incarnate Word		Joe Miller Field at Cowgirl Diamond • Lake Charles, LA	**L** 6–7	Trapp (5-8)	**Tate** (10-9)	Gunther (3)	ESPN+	507	31–19	11–3
Apr. 30	Incarnate Word		Joe Miller Field at Cowgirl Diamond • Lake Charles, LA	**W** 8–0^{5}	**Vallejo** (14-7)	Garcia (2-10)	None	ESPN+	507	32–19	12–3

May (3–0)
Date	Opponent	Rank	Site/stadium	Score	Win	Loss	Save	TV	Attendance	Overall record	SLC Record
May 6	at Nicholls		Swanner Field at Geo Surfaces Park • Thibodaux, LA	**W** 3–1	**Vallejo** (15-7)	Lehman (5-14)	None		201	33–19	13–3
May 6	at Nicholls		Swanner Field at Geo Surfaces Park • Thibodaux, LA	**W** 7–0	**Tate** (11-9)	Turner (7-15)	None		201	34–19	14–3
May 7	at Nicholls		Swanner Field at Geo Surfaces Park • Thibodaux, LA	**W** 3–0	**Vallejo** (16-7)	Lehman (5-15)	None		155	35–19	15–3

Postseason (5–2)

Southland Tournament (3–0)
Date	Opponent	(Seed)/Rank	Site/stadium	Score	Win	Loss	Save	TV	Attendance	Overall record	Tournament record
May 11	vs. (4) Northwestern State	(1)	North Oak Park • Hammond, LA	**W** 6–5^{8}	**Vallejo** (17-7)	Rhoden (6-5)	None	ESPN+	267	36–19	1–0
May 12	vs. (2) Southeastern Louisiana	(1)	North Oak Park • Hammond, LA	**W** 7–6^{8}	**Tate** (12-9)	Zumo (20-5)	None	ESPN+	381	37–19	2–0
May 13	vs. (2) Southeastern Louisiana	(1)	North Oak Park • Hammond, LA	**W** 10–4	**Sanders** (7-2)	Romano (0-3)	None	ESPN+	331	38–19	3–0

NCAA Division I softball tournament (2–2)
Date	Opponent	(Seed)/Rank	Site/stadium	Score	Win	Loss	Save	TV	Attendance	Overall record	Tournament record
Evanston Regionals
May 20	vs. (2)/No. 21 Notre Dame	(3)	Sharon J. Drysdale Field • Evanston, IL	**W** 11–1^{5}	**Tate** (13-9)	Tidd (15-4)	None	ESPN+	840	39–19	1–0
May 21	vs. (1)/No. 10 Northwestern	(3)	Sharon J. Drysdale Field • Evanston, IL	**L** 3–17^{5}	Williams (28-4)	**Vallejo** (17-8)	None	ESPN+		39–20	1–1
May 21	vs. (2)/No. 21 Notre Dame	(3)	Sharon J. Drysdale Field • Evanston, IL	**W** 3–1	**Vallejo** (18-8)	Becker (10-4)	None	ESPN+	987	40–20	2–1
May 22	vs. (1)/No. 10 Northwestern	(3)	Sharon J. Drysdale Field • Evanston, IL	**L** 2–10^{5}	Williams (29-4)	**Tate** (13-10)	None	ESPN+	1,120	40–21	2–2

Schedule source:

*Rankings are based on the team's current ranking in the NFCA/USA Softball poll.
