= 2022 Incarnate Word Cardinals softball team =

American college softball season

2022 Incarnate Word Cardinals softball
- Conference: Southland Conference
- Record: 15–36 (5–13 Southland)
- Head coach: Kimberly Dean (1st season)
- Assistant coaches: Hunter Bunch; Travis Owen
- Home stadium: H-E-B Field

2022 Southland Conference softball standings
| | Conf. | | | | Overall |
| Team | W | | L | PCT | W | | L | PCT |
|---|---|---|---|---|---|---|---|---|
| McNeese State ‍†‍‡‍^{y} | 15 | – | 3 | .833 | 40 | – | 21 | .656 |
| Southeastern Louisiana ‍‍‍ | 14 | – | 4 | .778 | 40 | – | 16 | .714 |
| Texas A&M–Corpus Christi ‍‍‍ | 11 | – | 7 | .611 | 25 | – | 27 | .481 |
| Northwestern State ‍‍‍ | 10 | – | 8 | .556 | 29 | – | 22 | .569 |
| Incarnate Word ‍‍‍ | 5 | – | 13 | .278 | 15 | – | 36 | .294 |
| Houston Baptist ‍‍‍ | 4 | – | 13 | .235 | 19 | – | 29 | .396 |
| Nicholls ‍‍‍ | 4 | – | 14 | .222 | 12 | – | 38 | .240 |
† – Conference champion ‡ – Tournament champion y – Invited to the NCAA tournament As of June 5, 2022; Rankings from NFCA/USA Today

The 2022 Incarnate Word Cardinals softball team represented the University of the Incarnate Word during the 2022 NCAA Division I softball season. The Cardinals played their home games at H-E-B Field and were led by first-year head coach Kimberly Dean. They were members of the Southland Conference.

== Preseason ==
=== Southland Conference Coaches Poll ===
The Southland Conference Coaches Poll was released on February 4, 2022. Incarnate Word was picked to finish fifth in the Southland Conference with 84 votes.

Coaches poll
| Predicted finish | Team | Votes (1st place) |
| 1 | McNeese State | 132 (12) |
| 2 | Northwestern State | 120 (2) |
| 3 | Southeastern Louisiana | 113 |
| 4 | Houston Baptist | 102 |
| 5 | Incarnate Word | 84 |
| 6 | Texas A&M–Corpus Christi | 82 |
| 7 | Nicholls | 81 |

=== Preseason All-Southland team ===
No players from Incarnate Word were chosen to the team

=== National Softball Signing Day ===
| Player | Position | Hometown | Previous Team |
|---|---|---|---|
| Dominique Guerra | Infielder/Utility | San Antonio, Texas | McCollum HS |
| Victoria Altamirano | Outfielder | Los Fresnos, Texas | Los Fresnos HS |
| Sammie Portillo | Pitcher | San Antonio, Texas | Sandra Day O'Connor HS |

== Personnel ==
2022 Incarnate Word Cardinals softball team
Players
Coaches

| # | Pos. | Name | Bats/throws | Height | Year | Home town |
|---|---|---|---|---|---|---|
| 1 | OF | Julia Cordon | / | — | Fr |
| 2 | INF | Maddison Guillen | / | 5 ft 3 in (1.6 m) | Fr | Pearland, Texas |
| 3 | INF | Hannah De la Rosa | / | 5 ft 10 in (1.78 m) | Fr | Pearland, Texas |
| 5 | C | Bella Sanchez | / | 5 ft 5 in (1.65 m) | So | San Antonio, Texas |
| 10 | P | Madison Floyd | / | 5 ft 11 in (1.8 m) | So | East Bernard, Texas |
| 12 | P | Ashley Trapp | / | 5 ft 7 in (1.7 m) | Sr | Columbus, Texas |
| 13 | P | Annie Gunther | / | 5 ft 9 in (1.75 m) | So | Sachse, Texas |
| 15 | INF | Jazmine Torres | / | 5 ft 8 in (1.73 m) | So | San Antonio, Texas |
| 18 | U | Lauren Olivarri | / | 5 ft 4 in (1.63 m) | Fr | San Antonio, Texas |
| 21 | U | Ryleigh Mata | / | 5 ft 3 in (1.6 m) | Fr | Santa Fe, Texas |
| 22 | U | Abby Frank | / | 5 ft 3 in (1.6 m) | So | Spring, Texas |
| 23 | C | Alicia Lopez | / | 5 ft 3 in (1.6 m) | So | La Porte, Texas |
| 24 | OF | Teanna Lucio | / | 5 ft 3 in (1.6 m) | Sr | Taylor, Texas |
| 25 | OF | Savannah Behabetz | / | 5 ft 8 in (1.73 m) | Jr | Littleton, Colorado |
| 26 | C | Avalon Sanchez | / | 5 ft 3 in (1.6 m) | Fr | Austin, Texas |
| 27 | INF | Leah Hayes | / | 5 ft 5 in (1.65 m) | Fr | San Antonio, Texas |
| 28 | P | Maddy Blake | / | 5 ft 3 in (1.6 m) | So | Santa Fe, Texas |
| 31 | P | Natalie Myers | / | 5 ft 8 in (1.73 m) | So | Pearland, Texas |
| 34 | OF | Kendall McGary | / | 5 ft 5 in (1.65 m) | So | Katy, Texas |
| 44 | OF | Maddie Boldt | / | 5 ft 8 in (1.73 m) | So | Round Rock, Texas |
| 76 | P | Catarina Esteves | / | 5 ft 8 in (1.73 m) | Fr | Austin, Texas |
| 77 | P | Aalyiah Garcia | / | 5 ft 5 in (1.65 m) | Jr | Angleton, Texas |

Head coach

Kimberly Dean (Southern Indiana)

Assistant coach(es)

Hunter Bunch (Montevallo)
Travis Owen (Northern State)

Legend

- (C) Team captain
- (S) Suspended
- (I) Ineligible
- Injured
- Current redshirt

Roster
Last update: 28 June 2022

== Schedule and results ==
Legend
| | Incarnate Word win |
| | Incarnate Word loss |
| | Postponement/Cancellation |
| **Bold** | Incarnate Word team member |

2022 Incarnate Word Cardinals softball game log
Regular season (15–34)

February (4–12)
| Date | Opponent | Rank | Site/stadium | Score | Win | Loss | Save | TV | Attendance | Overall record | SLC record |
UIW Tournament
| Feb. 10 | Cleveland State | | H-E-B Field • San Antonio, TX | **L** 3–4 | Watts (1-0) | **Trapp** (0-1) | None | | 89 | 0–1 | |
| Feb. 11 | Green Bay | | H-E-B Field • San Antonio, TX | **W** 9–4 | **Floyd** (1-0) | King (0-1) | None | | 212 | 1–1 | |
| Feb. 12 | Cleveland State | | H-E-B Field • San Antonio, TX | **L** 5–6 | Holzopfel (1-0) | **Floyd** (1-1) | None | | 273 | 1–2 | |
| Feb. 12 | Green Bay | | H-E-B Field • San Antonio, TX | **W** 4–2 | **Trapp** (1-1) | Baneck (1-1) | **Gunter** (1) | | 273 | 2–2 | |
| Feb. 13 | Prairie View A&M | | H-E-B Field • San Antonio, TX | **W** 19–6^{5} | **Gunther** (1-0) | Rojas (0-1) | None | | 228 | 3–2 | |
| Feb. 16 | Green Bay | | H-E-B Field • San Antonio, TX | **L** 3–7 | Gawlinski (2-0) | **Blake** (0-1) | None | | 112 | 3–3 | |
Cardinal Invitational
| Feb. 18 | Omaha | | H-E-B Field • San Antonio, TX | **L** 0–4 | Nuismer (1-2) | **Trapp** (1-2) | None | | 126 | 3–4 | |
| Feb. 19 | UMass | | H-E-B Field • San Antonio, TX | **L** 0–10^{5} | DiPasquale (2-2) | **Garcia** (0-1) | None | | 243 | 3–5 | |
| Feb. 19 | Boise State | | H-E-B Field • San Antonio, TX | **L** 0–16^{5} | Caudill (5-0) | **Gunther** (1-1) | None | | 273 | 3–6 | |
| Feb. 20 | Omaha | | H-E-B Field • San Antonio, TX | **L** 2–7 | Hampton (2-2) | **Trapp** (1-3) | None | | 244 | 3–7 | |
| Feb. 20 | UTSA | | H-E-B Field • San Antonio, TX | **L** 5–11 | Seith (1-2) | **Gunther** (1-2) | None | | 303 | 3–8 | |
| Feb. 23 | at Texas State | | Bobcat Softball Stadium • San Marcos, TX | Game postponed | | | | | | | |
GCU Tournament
| Feb. 25 | vs. Pacific | | GCU Softball Stadium • Phoenix, AZ | **W** 4–2 | **Myers** (1-0) | Strong (2-2) | None | | 115 | 4–8 | |
| Feb. 25 | at Grand Canyon | | GCU Softball Stadium • Phoenix, AZ | **L** 1–9 | Hambrick (5-1) | **Garcia** (0-2) | None | | 169 | 4–9 | |
| Feb. 26 | vs. Colorado State | | GCU Softball Stadium • Phoenix, AZ | **L** 6–11 | Nannen (2-1) | **Trapp** (1-4) | None | | 150 | 4–10 | |
| Feb. 26 | vs. Colgate | | GCU Softball Stadium • Phoenix, AZ | **L** 3–4 | Borruso (3-1) | **Garcia** (0-3) | Edwards (1) | | 169 | 4–11 | |
| Feb. 27 | vs. Colorado State | | GCU Softball Stadium • Phoenix, AZ | **L** 0–1^{8} | Hornbuckle (1-3) | **Garcia** (0-4) | None | | 45 | 4–12 | |

March (7–8)
| Date | Opponent | Rank | Site/stadium | Score | Win | Loss | Save | TV | Attendance | Overall record | SLC record |
|---|---|---|---|---|---|---|---|---|---|---|---|
| Mar. 5 | at UTEP | | Helen of Troy Softball Complex • El Paso, TX | **L** 0–8^{5} | Alarcon (4-5) | **Myers** (1-1) | None | | 307 | 4–13 | |
| Mar. 5 | at UTEP | | Helen of Troy Softball Complex • El Paso, TX | **W** 8–7 | **Garcia** (1-4) | Collins (1-2) | None | | 307 | 5–13 | |
| Mar. 6 | at UTEP | | Helen of Troy Softball Complex • El Paso, TX | **L** 8–10 | Alarcon (5-5) | **Garcia** (1-5) | None | | 117 | 5–14 | |
| Mar. 8 | at Abilene Christian | | Poly Wells Field • Abilene, TX | **W** 3–1 | **Myers** (2-1) | Holman (4-6) | None | | 36 | 6–14 | |
| Mar. 8 | at Abilene Christian | | Poly Wells Field • Abilene, TX | **W** 5–4 | **Trapp** (2-4) | White (5-5) | **Myers** (1) | | 46 | 7–14 | |
| Mar. 15 | UT Arlington | | H-E-B Field • San Antonio, TX | **L** 5–11 | Adams (5-7) | **Gunther** (1-3) | None | | 101 | 7–15 | |
Red Raider Classic
| Mar. 19 | vs. Northern Colorado | | Rocky Johnson Field • Lubbock, TX | **L** 1–6 | Golden (6-5) | **Myers** (2-2) | None | | 97 | 7–16 | |
| Mar. 19 | at Texas Tech | | Rocky Johnson Field • Lubbock, TX | **L** 4–7 | Kuehl (2-1) | **Myers** (2-3) | Hornback (1) | | 203 | 7–17 | |
| Mar. 20 | vs. Northern Colorado | | Rocky Johnson Field • Lubbock, TX | **L** 9–10 | Knox (1-0) | **Floyd** (1-2) | None | | 90 | 7–18 | |
| Mar. 20 | at Texas Tech | | Rocky Johnson Field • Lubbock, TX | **L** 1–2 | Fritz (11-4) | **Garcia** (1-6) | None | | 176 | 7–19 | |
| Mar. 22 | Texas Southern | | H-E-B Field • San Antonio, TX | **W** 4–3 | **Gunther** (2-3) | Rodriguez (1-1) | None | | 227 | 8–19 | |
| Mar. 25 | Nicholls | | H-E-B Field • San Antonio, TX | **W** 5–4 | **Myers** (3-3) | Lehman (3-7) | None | | 123 | 9–19 | 1–0 |
| Mar. 25 | Nicholls | | H-E-B Field • San Antonio, TX | **L** 4–9 | Lehman (4-7) | **Garcia** (1-7) | None | | 123 | 9–20 | 1–1 |
| Mar. 26 | Nicholls | | H-E-B Field • San Antonio, TX | **W** 9–1^{6} | **Trapp** (3-4) | Turner (5-10) | None | | 143 | 10–20 | 2–1 |
| Mar. 29 | at Baylor | | Getterman Stadium • Waco, TX | **W** 6–4 | **Floyd** (2-2) | West (4-2) | **Trapp** (1) | | 505 | 11–20 | |

April (3–12)
| Date | Opponent | Rank | Site/stadium | Score | Win | Loss | Save | TV | Attendance | Overall record | SLC record |
|---|---|---|---|---|---|---|---|---|---|---|---|
| Apr. 1 | at Southeastern Louisiana | | North Oak Park • Hammond, LA | **L** 2–4 | Comeaux (7-3) | **Trapp** (3-5) | Romano (1) | | 210 | 11–21 | 2–2 |
| Apr. 1 | at Southeastern Louisiana | | North Oak Park • Hammond, LA | **L** 1–9 | Zumo (11-3) | **Floyd** (2-3) | None | | 318 | 11–22 | 2–3 |
| Apr. 2 | at Southeastern Louisiana | | North Oak Park • Hammond, LA | **L** 3–7 | Zumo (12-3) | **Garcia** (1-8) | None | | 225 | 11–23 | 2–4 |
| Apr. 5 | at Texas A&M | | Davis Diamond • College Station, TX | **L** 2–10^{6} | Uribe (5-2) | **Trapp** (3-6) | None | | 785 | 11–24 | |
| Apr. 8 | Houston Baptist | | H-E-B Field • San Antonio, TX | **L** 0–3 | Swanson (5-4) | **Floyd** (2-4) | None | | 106 | 11–25 | 2–5 |
| Apr. 8 | Houston Baptist | | H-E-B Field • San Antonio, TX | **W** 5–4 | **Trapp** (4-6) | Cotton (2-6) | **Gunther** (2) | | 106 | 12–25 | 3–5 |
| Apr. 9 | Houston Baptist | | H-E-B Field • San Antonio, TX | **L** 4–7 | Swanson (6-4) | **Gunther** (2-4) | None | | 117 | 12–26 | 3–6 |
| Apr. 13 | at UTSA | | Roadrunner Field • San Antonio, TX | **W** 5–2 | **Garcia** (2-8) | Estell (3-8) | None | | 267 | 13–26 | |
| Apr. 20 | at Texas State | | Bobcat Softball Stadium • San Marcos, TX | **L** 0–12^{5} | Mullins (17-11) | **Garcia** (2-9) | None | | 433 | 13–27 | |
| Apr. 22 | at Northwestern State | | Lady Demon Diamond • Natchitoches, LA | **L**0–1 | Hoover (10-5) | **Trapp** (4-7) | None | | 204 | 13–28 | 3–7 |
| Apr. 22 | at Northwestern State | | Lady Demon Diamond • Natchitoches, LA | **L** 3–5 | Darr (9-3) | **Floyd** (2-5) | None | | 185 | 13–29 | 3–8 |
| Apr. 23 | at Northwestern State | | Lady Demon Diamond • Natchitoches, LA | **L** 0–2 | Rhoden (6-3) | **Myers** (3-4) | None | | 209 | 13–30 | 3–9 |
| Apr. 29 | at McNeese State | | Joe Miller Field at Cowgirl Diamond • Lake Charles, LA | **L** 0–9^{5} | Vallejo (13-7) | **Trapp** (4-8) | None | ESPN+ | 447 | 13–31 | 3–10 |
| Apr. 29 | at McNeese State | | Joe Miller Field at Cowgirl Diamond • Lake Charles, LA | **W** 7–6 | **Trapp** (5-8) | Tate (10-9) | **Gunther** (3) | ESPN+ | 447 | 14–31 | 4–10 |
| Apr. 30 | at McNeese State | | Joe Miller Field at Cowgirl Diamond • Lake Charles, LA | **L** 0–8 | Vallejo (14-7) | **Garcia** (2-10) | None | ESPN+ | 507 | 14–32 | 4–11 |

May (1–2)
| Date | Opponent | Rank | Site/stadium | Score | Win | Loss | Save | TV | Attendance | Overall record | SLC record |
|---|---|---|---|---|---|---|---|---|---|---|---|
| May 6 | Texas A&M–Corpus Christi | | H-E-B Field • San Antonio, TX | **L** 2–4 | Gilbert (8-8) | **Garcia** (2-11) | None | | 124 | 14–33 | 4–12 |
| May 6 | Texas A&M–Corpus Christi | | H-E-B Field • San Antonio, TX | **L** 1–6 | Galvan (5-0) | **Floyd** (2-6) | None | | 202 | 14–34 | 4–13 |
| May 7 | Texas A&M–Corpus Christi | | H-E-B Field • San Antonio, TX | **W** 3–2 | **Trapp** (6-8) | Smith (4-9) | None | | 157 | 15–34 | 5–13 |

Post-Season (0–2)

Southland Tournament (0–2)
| Date | Opponent | (Seed)/Rank | Site/stadium | Score | Win | Loss | Save | TV | Attendance | Overall record | Tournament record |
|---|---|---|---|---|---|---|---|---|---|---|---|
| May 10 | vs. (4) Northwestern State | (5) | North Oak Park • Hammond, LA | **L** 3–4 | Hoover (11-7) | **Trapp** (6-9) | None | ESPN+ | 191 | 15–35 | 0–1 |
| May 12 | vs. (6) Houston Baptist | (5) | North Oak Park • Hammond, LA | **L** 4–8 | Swanson (9-7) | **Garcia** (2-12) | None | ESPN+ | 250 | 15–36 | 0–2 |

Schedule source:

*Rankings are based on the team's current ranking in the NFCA/USA Softball poll.
