= 2022 Houston Baptist Huskies softball team =

Houston Baptist University softball team

2022 Houston Baptist Huskies softball
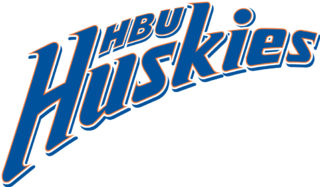
- Conference: Southland Conference
- Record: 19–29 (4–13 Southland)
- Head coach: Mary-Ellen Hall (31st season)
- Assistant coaches: Natali Duron; Heidi Jaquez
- Home stadium: Husky Field

2022 Southland Conference softball standings
	Conf.				Overall
Team	W		L	PCT	W		L	PCT
McNeese State ‍†‍‡‍^{y}	15	–	3	.833	40	–	21	.656
Southeastern Louisiana ‍‍‍	14	–	4	.778	40	–	16	.714
Texas A&M–Corpus Christi ‍‍‍	11	–	7	.611	25	–	27	.481
Northwestern State ‍‍‍	10	–	8	.556	29	–	22	.569
Incarnate Word ‍‍‍	5	–	13	.278	15	–	36	.294
Houston Baptist ‍‍‍	4	–	13	.235	19	–	29	.396
Nicholls ‍‍‍	4	–	14	.222	12	–	38	.240
† – Conference champion ‡ – Tournament champion y – Invited to the NCAA tournament As of June 5, 2022; Rankings from NFCA/USA Today

The 2022 Houston Baptist Huskies softball team represented Houston Baptist University during the 2022 NCAA Division I softball season. The Huskies played their home games at Husky Field and were led by thirty–first year head coach Mary-Ellen Hall. They were members of the Southland Conference.

This was the Huskies' final season as Houston Baptist. On September 21, 2022, the university announced it had adopted the new name of Houston Christian University. The Huskies nickname was not affected.

== Preseason ==
=== Southland Conference Coaches Poll ===
The Southland Conference Coaches Poll was released on February 4, 2022. Houston Baptist was picked to finish fourth in the Southland Conference with 102 votes.

Coaches poll
Predicted finish	Team	Votes (1st place)
1	McNeese State	132 (12)
2	Northwestern State	120 (2)
3	Southeastern Louisiana	113
4	Houston Baptist	102
5	Incarnate Word	84
6	Texas A&M–Corpus Christi	82
7	Nicholls	81

=== Preseason All-Southland team ===
==== First Team ====
- Caitlyn Brockway (HBU, JR, 1st Base)
- Cayla Jones (NSU, SR, 2nd Base)
- Lindsey Rizzo (SELA, SR, 3rd Base)
- Ashleigh Sgambelluri (TAMUCC, JR, Shortstop)
- Chloe Gomez (MCNS, SO, Catcher)
- Kaylee Lopez (MCNS, JR, Designated Player)
- Jil Poullard (MCNS, SO, Outfielder)
- Audrey Greely (SELA, SO, Outfielder)
- Aeriyl Mass (SELA, SR, Outfielder)
- Pal Egan (TAMUCC, JR, Outfielder)
- Lyndie Swanson (HBU, R-FR, Pitcher)
- Whitney Tate (MCNS, SO, Pitcher)
- Jasie Roberts (HBU, R-FR, Utility)

==== Second Team ====
- Haley Moore (TAMUCC, SO, 1st Base)
- Shelby Echols (HBU, SO, 2nd Base)
- Autumn Sydlik (HBU, JR, 3rd Base)
- Keely DuBois (NSU, SO, Shortstop)
- Bailey Krolczyk (SELA, SO, Catcher)
- Lexi Johnson (SELA, SO, Designated Player)
- Toni Perrin (MCNS, SR, Outfielder)
- Cam Goodman (SELA, SO, Outfielder)
- Alexandria Torres (TAMUCC, SO, Outfielder)
- Ashley Vallejo (MCNS, SO, Pitcher)
- Heather Zumo (SELA, SR, Pitcher)
- Beatriz Lara (TAMUCC, JR, Pitcher)
- Melise Gossen (NICH, JR, Utility)

== Personnel ==
2022 Houston Baptist Huskies softball team
Players
Coaches

#	Pos.	Name	Bats/throws	Height	Year	Home town
1	C	Jasie Roberts	R/R	5 ft 8 in (1.73 m)	So	Pasadena, Texas
2	INF	Baylee Chandler (redshirt)	R/R	5 ft 5 in (1.65 m)	Fr	Liberty, Texas
3	INF	Kaicey Hagler	R/R	5 ft 6 in (1.68 m)	So	Splendora, Texas
4	U	Avery Drake (redshirt)	R/L	5 ft 3 in (1.6 m)	Fr	Belton, Texas
5	C	Justice Palmer	R/R	5 ft 10 in (1.78 m)	Fr	Fairhope, Alabama
7	RHP	Madison Cotton (redshirt)	R/R	5 ft 9 in (1.75 m)	Fr	Belton, Texas
8	INF	Shelby Echols	R/L	5 ft 6 in (1.68 m)	So	Pearland, Texas
11	INF	Autumn Sydlik	R/R	5 ft 6 in (1.68 m)	Jr	Spring, Texas
12	OF	AB Garcia	L/L	5 ft 7 in (1.7 m)	Fr	Cypress, Texas
18	U	Haylie Savage	R/L	5 ft 8 in (1.73 m)	Fr	Angleton, Texas
20	U	Katy Janes	/	5 ft 8 in (1.73 m)	So	Huffman, Texas
21	RHP	Sarah Venker	R/R	5 ft 4 in (1.63 m)	Jr	Houston, Texas
23	C	Caitlyn Brockway	R/R	5 ft 11 in (1.8 m)	Jr	Tomball, Texas
26	OF	Riley Martin	L/R	5 ft 4 in (1.63 m)	So	Pearland, Texas
27	U	Jackie Jessup	R/R	6 ft 0 in (1.83 m)	So	Sugar Land, Texas
32	U	Breana Herrera	R/R	5 ft 9 in (1.75 m)	Fr	Corpus Christi, Texas
33	RHP	Lyndie Swanson	R/R	5 ft 9 in (1.75 m)	So	Katy, Texas

Head coach

Mary-Ellen Hall (US Sports Academy)

Assistant coach(es)

Natali Duron (Houston)
Heidi Jaquez (Houston Baptist)

Legend

- (C) Team captain
- (S) Suspended
- (I) Ineligible
- Injured
- Current redshirt

Roster
Last update: 28 June 2022

== Schedule and results ==
Legend
	Houston Baptist win
	Houston Baptist loss
	Postponement/Cancellation
**Bold**	Houston Baptist team member

2022 Houston Baptist Huskies softball game log
Regular season (16–27)

February (6–5)
Date	Opponent	Rank	Site/stadium	Score	Win	Loss	Save	TV	Attendance	Overall record	SLC record
Bearkat Classic
Feb. 11	vs. Dayton		Bearkat Softball Complex • Huntsville, TX	**W** 2–0	**Swanson** (1–0)	Gumm (0–1)	None			1–0	
Feb. 11	vs. South Dakota		Bearkat Softball Complex • Huntsville, TX	**L** 0–6	Edwards (1–0)	**Janes** (0–1)	None			1–1	
Feb. 12	vs. Wichita State		Bearkat Softball Complex • Huntsville, TX	**L** 2–10^{6}	Schopfer (1–0)	**Swanson** (1-1)	None		256	1–2	
Feb. 12	at Sam Houston State		Bearkat Softball Complex • Huntsville, TX	Game cancelled							
Feb. 15	Texas Southern		Husky Field • Houston, TX	**W** 3–2	**Swanson** (2–1)	Gendorf (0–2)	None	ESPN+	217	2–2	
Southern Miss Invitational
Feb. 18	vs. Louisiana–Monroe		Southern Miss Softball Complex • Hattiesburg, MS	**L** 7–11	Abrams (2–0)	**Janes** (0–2)	None	CUSA.TV	272	2–3	
Feb. 18	vs. Jacksonville State		Southern Miss Softball Complex • Hattiesburg, MS	**L** 3–7	Androlevich (2–1)	**Cotton** (0–1)	None	CUSA.TV	256	2–4	
Feb. 19	vs. Mississippi Valley State		Southern Miss Softball Complex • Hattiesburg, MS	**W** 2–0	**Janes** (1–2)	Wren (0–3)	None	CUS.TV	103	3–4	
Feb. 19	at Southern Miss		Southern Miss Softball Complex • Hattiesburg, MS	**L** 0–3	Leinstock (3–1)	**Venker** (0–1)	None	CUSA.TV		3–5	
UH Tournament
Feb. 26	vs. Lamar		Cougar Softball Stadium • Houston, TX	**W** 11–8	**Janes** (2-2)	Mixon (0–3)	None			4–5	
Feb. 26	at Houston		Cougar Softball Stadium • Houston, TX	Game cancelled							
Feb. 27	vs. Lamar		Cougar Softball Stadium • Houston, TX	**W** 11–9	**Janes** (3–2)	Ruiz (3–6)	None			5–5	
Feb. 27	at Houston		Cougar Softball Stadium • Houston, TX	**W** 7–0	**Swanson** (3–1)	Wilkey (2–4)	None	ESPN+	350	6–5	

March (4–11)
Date	Opponent	Rank	Site/stadium	Score	Win	Loss	Save	TV	Attendance	Overall record	SLC record
Mar. 1	UTSA		Husky Field • Houston, TX	**L** 1–9	Seith (1–0)	**Cotton** (0–2)	None	ESPN+		6–6	
Mar. 4	Brown		Husky Field • Houston, TX	**L** 2–3	Guevara (1-1)	**Janes** (3-3)	Innerst (1)		150	6–7	
Mar. 4	Prairie View A&M		Husky Field • Houston, TX	**W** 2–0	**Swanson** (4–1)	Hall (0–2)	None		131	7–7	
Mar. 5	Brown		Husky Field • Houston, TX	**W** 4–2	**Venker** (1-1)	Aguirre (0–2)	None		109	8–7	
Mar. 5	Prairie View A&M		Husky Field • Houston, TX	**W** 9–1^{6}	**Cotton** (1–2)	Massey (0–3)	None		194	9–7	
Mar. 6	Brown		Husky Field • Houston, TX	**L** 1–3	Guevara (2–1)	**Venker** (1–2)	None		162	9–8	
Lipscomb University Tournament
Mar. 11	vs. Pittsburgh		Draper Diamond • Nashville, TN	**L** 0–4	Muraskin (4–2)	**Venker** (1–3)	None		131	9–9	
Mar. 11	at Lipscomb		Draper Diamond • Nashville, TN	**W** 9–4	**Cotton** (2-2)	Peters (1–3)	**Venker** (1)		127	10–9	
Mar. 13	vs. Bowling Green		Draper Diamond • Nashville, TN	**L** 4–7	Hurley (3–1)	**Venker** (1–4)	Gottshall (2)		117	10–10	
Mar. 13	at Lipscomb		Draper Diamond • Nashville, TN	**L** 8–10	Barefoot (4-4)	**Cotton** (2–3)	None		187	10–11	
Mar. 23	at Texas A&M		Davis Diamond • College Station, TX	**L** 4–5	Poynter (2–0)	**Swanson** (4–2)	None		809	10–12	
Mar. 25	Northwestern State		Husky Field • Houston, TX	**L** 1–5	Hoover (6–3)	**Swanson** (4–3)	None	ESPN+	288	10–13	0–1
Mar. 25	Northwestern State		Husky Field • Houston, TX	**L** 2–10	Darr (8–2)	**Cotton** (2–4)	None	ESPN+	288	10–14	0–2
Mar. 26	Northwestern State		Husky Field • Houston, TX	**L** 1–7	Rhoden (3-3)	**Venker** (1–5)	None	ESPN+	279	10–15	0–3
Mar. 29	at Lamar		Lamar Softball Complex • Beaumont, TX	**L** 1–9^{5}	Ruiz (5–10)	**Venker** (1–6)	None		400	10–16	

April (4–11)
Date	Opponent	Rank	Site/stadium	Score	Win	Loss	Save	TV	Attendance	Overall record	SLC record
Apr. 3	at McNeese State		Joe Miller Field at Cowgirl Diamond • Lake Charles, LA	**L** 1–9^{6}	Sanders (6–0)	**Cotton** (2–5)	None			10–17	0–4
Apr. 3	at McNeese State		Joe Miller Field at Cowgirl Diamond • Lake Charles, LA	**L** 1–9^{5}	Vallejo (8–6)	**Swanson** (4–3)	None		411	10–18	0–5
Apr. 5	at Prairie View A&M		Lady Panther Softball Field • Prairie View, TX	Game cancelled							
Apr. 8	at Incarnate Word		H-E-B Field • San Antonio, TX	**W** 3–0	**Swanson** (5–4)	Floyd (2–4)	None		106	11–18	1–5
Apr. 8	at Incarnate Word		H-E-B Field • San Antonio, TX	**L** 4–5	Trapp (4–6)	**Cotton** (2–6)	Gunther (2)		106	11–19	1–6
Apr. 9	at Incarnate Word		H-E-B Field • San Antonio, TX	**W** 7–4	**Swanson** (6–4)	Gunther (2–4)	None		117	12–19	2–6
Apr. 13	Sam Houston State		Husky Field • Houston, TX	**L** 1–5	Wasik (4–2)	**Cotton** (2–7)	Dunn (1)	ESPN+	130	12–20	
Apr. 15	Texas A&M–Corpus Christi		Husky Field • Houston, TX	**L** 0–1	Gilbert (4–8)	**Swanson** (6–5)	None	ESPN+	211	12–21	2–7
Apr. 15	Texas A&M–Corpus Christi		Husky Field • Houston, TX	**L** 0–7	Galvan (2–0)	**Cotton** (2–8)	None	ESPN+	256	12–22	2–8
Apr. 16	Texas A&M–Corpus Christi		Husky Field • Houston, TX	**L** 0–2	Gilbert (5–8)	**Swanson** (6-6)	None	ESPN+	194	12–23	2–9
Apr. 22	at Southeastern Louisiana		North Oak Park • Hammond, LA	**L** 0–5	Zumo (15–3)	**Swanson** (6–7)	None	ESPN+	115	12–24	2–10
Apr. 22	at Southeastern Louisiana		North Oak Park • Hammond, LA	**L** 6–14^{6}	Ladner (6–2)	**Cotton** (2–9)	None	ESPN+	115	12–25	2–11
Apr. 23	at Southeastern Louisiana		North Oak Park • Hammond, LA	**L** 1–2	Zumo (16–3)	**Venker** (1–7)	None	ESPN+	225	12–26	2–12
Apr. 27	at UTSA		Roadrunner Field • San Antonio, TX	Game cancelled							
Apr. 29	Nicholls		Husky Field • Houston, TX	**W** 1–0	**Swanson** (7-7)	Turner (6–14)	None		241	13–26	3–12
Apr. 29	Nicholls		Husky Field • Houston, TX	**W** 6–5	**Cotton** (3–9)	Lehman (5–13)	**Swanson** (1)		208	14–26	4–12
Apr. 30	Nicholls		Husky Field • Houston, TX	**L** 0–1	Turner (7–14)	**Venker** (1–8)	Lehman (1)		226	14–27	4–13

May (2–0)
Date	Opponent	Rank	Site/stadium	Score	Win	Loss	Save	TV	Attendance	Overall record	SLC record
May 7	at Tarleton State		Tarleton Softball Complex • Stephenville, TX	**W** 9–7	**Swanson** (8–7)	Bridges (11-11)	**Venker** (2)		450	15–27	
May 7	at Tarleton State		Tarleton Softball Complex • Stephenville, TX	**W** 6–3	**Cotton** (4–9)	Chism (7–5)	None		455	16–27	

Post-Season (3–2)

Southland Tournament (3–2)
Date	Opponent	(Seed)/Rank	Site/stadium	Score	Win	Loss	Save	TV	Attendance	Overall record	Tournament record
May 10	vs. (3) Texas A&M–Corpus Christi	(6)	North Oak Park • Hammond, LA	**W** 5–4^{8}	**Cotton** (5–9)	Galvan (5–1)	None	ESPN+	225	17–27	1–0
May 11	vs. (2) Southeastern Louisiana	(6)	North Oak Park • Hammond, LA	**L** 5–8	Zumo (20–4)	**Cotton** (5–10)	None	ESPN+	361	17–28	1–1
May 11	vs. (5) Incarnate Word	(6)	North Oak Park • Hammond, LA	**W** 8–4	**Swanson** (9–7)	Garcia (2–12)	None	ESPN+	250	18–28	2–1
May 12	vs. (3) Texas A&M–Corpus Christi	(6)	North Oak Park • Hammond, LA	**W** 5–3	**Cotton** (6–10)	Galvan (5–2)	**Swanson** (2)	ESPN+	231	19–28	3–1
May 12	vs. (2) Southeastern Louisiana	(6)	North Oak Park • Hammond, LA	**L** 1–9	Ladner (8–3)	**Swanson** (9–8)	None	ESPN+	258	19–29	3–2

Schedule source:*Rankings are based on the team's current ranking in the NFCA/USA Softball poll.
