= 2022 Nicholls Colonels softball team =

American college softball season

2022 Nicholls Colonels softball
- Conference: Southland Conference
- Record: 12–38 (4–14 Southland)
- Head coach: Justin Lewis (1st season)
- Assistant coaches: Ron Frost; Carli Cutler
- Home stadium: Swanner Field at Geo Surfaces Park

2022 Southland Conference softball standings
	Conf.				Overall
Team	W		L	PCT	W		L	PCT
McNeese State ‍†‍‡‍^{y}	15	–	3	.833	40	–	21	.656
Southeastern Louisiana ‍‍‍	14	–	4	.778	40	–	16	.714
Texas A&M–Corpus Christi ‍‍‍	11	–	7	.611	25	–	27	.481
Northwestern State ‍‍‍	10	–	8	.556	29	–	22	.569
Incarnate Word ‍‍‍	5	–	13	.278	15	–	36	.294
Houston Baptist ‍‍‍	4	–	13	.235	19	–	29	.396
Nicholls ‍‍‍	4	–	14	.222	12	–	38	.240
† – Conference champion ‡ – Tournament champion y – Invited to the NCAA tournament As of June 5, 2022; Rankings from NFCA/USA Today

The 2022 Nicholls Colonels softball team represented Nicholls State University during the 2022 NCAA Division I softball season. The Colonels played their home games at Swanner Field at Geo Surfaces Park and were led by first-year head coach Justin Lewis. They were members of the Southland Conference.

== Preseason ==
=== Southland Conference Coaches Poll ===
The Southland Conference Coaches Poll was released on February 4, 2022. Nicholls was picked to finish seventh in the Southland Conference with 81 votes.

Coaches poll
Predicted finish	Team	Votes (1st place)
1	McNeese State	132 (12)
2	Northwestern State	120 (2)
3	Southeastern Louisiana	113
4	Houston Baptist	102
5	Incarnate Word	84
6	Texas A&M–Corpus Christi	82
7	Nicholls	81

=== Preseason All-Southland team ===
==== First Team ====
- Caitlyn Brockway (HBU, JR, 1st Base)
- Cayla Jones (NSU, SR, 2nd Base)
- Lindsey Rizzo (SELA, SR, 3rd Base)
- Ashleigh Sgambelluri (TAMUCC, JR, Shortstop)
- Chloe Gomez (MCNS, SO, Catcher)
- Kaylee Lopez (MCNS, JR, Designated Player)
- Jil Poullard (MCNS, SO, Outfielder)
- Audrey Greely (SELA, SO, Outfielder)
- Aeriyl Mass (SELA, SR, Outfielder)
- Pal Egan (TAMUCC, JR, Outfielder)
- Lyndie Swanson (HBU, R-FR, Pitcher)
- Whitney Tate (MCNS, SO, Pitcher)
- Jasie Roberts (HBU, R-FR, Utility)

==== Second Team ====
- Haley Moore (TAMUCC, SO, 1st Base)
- Shelby Echols (HBU, SO, 2nd Base)
- Autumn Sydlik (HBU, JR, 3rd Base)
- Keely DuBois (NSU, SO, Shortstop)
- Bailey Krolczyk (SELA, SO, Catcher)
- Lexi Johnson (SELA, SO, Designated Player)
- Toni Perrin (MCNS, SR, Outfielder)
- Cam Goodman (SELA, SO, Outfielder)
- Alexandria Torres (TAMUCC, SO, Outfielder)
- Ashley Vallejo (MCNS, SO, Pitcher)
- Heather Zumo (SELA, SR, Pitcher)
- Beatriz Lara (TAMUCC, JR, Pitcher)
- Melise Gossen (NICH, JR, Utility)

== Personnel ==
2022 Nicholls Colonels softball team
Players
Coaches

#	Pos.	Name	Bats/throws	Height	Year	Home town
1	U	Danielle Duplay	L/R	4 ft 11 in (1.5 m)	Jr	Luling, Louisiana
2	OF	McKenzie Champagne	L/R	5 ft 4 in (1.63 m)	Fr	Lockport, Louisiana
4	OF	Jacey Meade	L/L	5 ft 5 in (1.65 m)	Fr	Spring, Texas
5	INF	Samantha Gwiazda	R/R	5 ft 9 in (1.75 m)	So	Frankfort, Illinois
6	RHP	Paris Lehman	R/R	6 ft 0 in (1.83 m)	Fr	Tupelo, Mississippi
7	U	Kelsey Johnson	L/L	5 ft 7 in (1.7 m)	So	Belle Chasse, Louisiana
9	INF	Alexa Poche'	L/L	5 ft 8 in (1.73 m)	So	New Orleans, Louisiana
10	C	Lulu Vazquez	R/R	5 ft 9 in (1.75 m)	So	Texas City, Texas
15	OF	Shelby Devine	L/L	5 ft 5 in (1.65 m)	So	Belle Chasse, Louisiana
16	RHP	Taryn Westbrook	L/R	5 ft 10 in (1.78 m)	So	Salado, Texas
17	INF	Maya Zavala	R/R	5 ft 2 in (1.57 m)	Jr	Edinburg, Texas
18	RHP	Brittney Turner	R/R	5 ft 9 in (1.75 m)	So	Albany, Louisiana
19	U	Scout Blades	R/R	5 ft 8 in (1.73 m)	So	Thibodaux, Louisiana
20	U	Melise Gossen	R/R	5 ft 8 in (1.73 m)	Jr	Rayne, Louisiana
21	INF	Sydnee Shelton	R/R	5 ft 9 in (1.75 m)	So	Fort Worth, Texas
22	OF	Kennedy Hebert	R/R	5 ft 8 in (1.73 m)	Jr	Morgan City, Louisiana
25	OF	Haley Fontenot	R/R	5 ft 6 in (1.68 m)	Fr	Morgan City, Louisiana
27	OF	Bree Aguillard (redshirt)	L/R	5 ft 7 in (1.7 m)	So	Houma, Louisiana
28	C	Adie Brake	R/R	5 ft 11 in (1.8 m)	So	Denver, Colorado
34	INF	Julia Kramer	R/R	5 ft 8 in (1.73 m)	Fr	Prairieville, Louisiana
42	OF	Jaida Choice	R/R	6 ft 0 in (1.83 m)	So	Tuscaloosa, Alabama
55	C	Sadie Wells	R/R	5 ft 10 in (1.78 m)	Fr	Loranger, Louisiana

Head coach

Justin Lewis (Louisiana–Monroe)

Assistant coach(es)

Ron Frost (Alabama State)
Carli Cutler (Connecticut)

Legend

- (C) Team captain
- (S) Suspended
- (I) Ineligible
- Injured
- Current redshirt

Roster
Last update: 28 June 2022

== Schedule and results ==
Legend
	Nicholls win
	Nicholls loss
	Postponement/cancellation
**Bold**	Nicholls team member

2022 Nicholls Colonels softball game log
Regular season (12–36)

February (4–11)
Date	Opponent	Rank	Site/stadium	Score	Win	Loss	Save	TV	Attendance	Overall record	SLC record
Lion Classic
Feb. 11	vs. Alabama A&M		North Oak Park • Hammond, LA	**L** 6–9	Esperanza (1–0)	**Turner** (0–1)	None		223	0–1	
Feb. 12	vs. Alabama A&M		North Oak Park • Hammond, LA	**W** 7–3	**Turner** (1–1)	Esperanza (1–1)	**Westbrook** (1)		220	1–1	
Feb. 12	vs. Southeast Missouri State		North Oak Park • Hammond, LA	**L** 5–13^{5}	Anderson (1–0)	**Westbrook** (0–1)	None		203	1–2	
Feb. 13	vs. Southeast Missouri State		North Oka Park • Hammond, LA	**L** 2–5	Rook (2–1)	**Hebert** (0–1)	None		152	1–3	
Feb. 15	at No. 20 Louisiana		Yvette Girouard Field at Lamson Park • Lafayette, LA	**L** 2–10^{5}	Landry (3–0)	**Lehman** (0–1)	None	ESPN+	1,604	1–4	
Troy Tournament
Feb. 18	vs. Ole Miss		Troy Softball Complex • Troy, AL	**L** 2–10^{5}	Riley (1–0)	**Turner** (1–2)	None		79	1–5	
Feb. 18	at Troy		Troy Softball Complex • Troy, AL	**L** 0–8^{5}	Baker (3–0)	**Lehman** (2–0)	None		217	1–6	
Feb. 19	vs. Eastern Kentucky		Troy Softball Complex • Troy, AL	**L** 2–3	Reynoso (1–4)	**Turner** (1–3)	None		123	1–7	
Feb. 19	at Troy		Troy Softball Complex • Troy, AL	**L** 9–10	Bailey (1–1)	**Lehman** (0–3)	Johnson (1)		497	1–8	
Feb. 20	vs. Eastern Kentucky		Troy Softball Complex • Troy, AL	**W** 10–2^{5}	**Turner** (2–4)	Todd (0–5)	None		67	2–8	
Mardi Gras Mambo
Feb. 25	vs. No. 2 Alabama		Youngsville Sports Complex • Youngsville, LA	**L** 2–5	Salter (3–0)	**Hebert** (0–2)	Torrence (1)			2–9	
Feb. 25	vs. Lipscomb		Youngsville Sports Complex • Youngsville, LA	**L** 2–4	Barefoot (2–1)	**Turner** (2–5)	None		67	2–10	
Feb. 26	vs. St. Thomas		Youngsville Sports Complex • Youngsville, LA	**W** 5–3	**Turner** (3–5)	Baniecke (1–3)	**Lehman** (1)		108	3–10	
Feb. 26	vs. Portland State		Youngsville Sports Complex • Youngsville, LA	**L** 0–1	Grey (6–1)	**Lehman** (0–4)	None		90	3–11	
Feb. 27	vs. Eastern Illinois		Youngsville Sports Complex • Youngsville, LA	**W** 4–2	**Lehman** (1–4)	Rehmeier (4–1)	None		135	4–11	

March (5–9)
Date	Opponent	Rank	Site/stadium	Score	Win	Loss	Save	TV	Attendance	Overall record	SLC record
Black and Gold Tournament
Mar. 4	vs. Eastern Kentucky		Barbara Williams Softball Complex • Montgomery, AL	**W** 6–5	**Lehman** (2–4)	Reynoso (2–6)	None		54	5–11	
Mar. 4	at Alabama State		Barbara Williams Softball Complex • Montgomery, AL	**W** 7–2	**Turner** (4–5)	Pye (1–2)	None		88	6–11	
Mar. 5	vs. North Alabama		Barbara Williams Softball Complex • Montgomery, AL	**L** 1–11^{5}	Revels (4–1)	**Turner** (4–6)	None		66	6–12	
Mar. 5	at Alabama State		Barbara Williams Softball Complex • Montgomery, AL	**W** 7–5	**Lehman** (3–4)	Lewis (1–2)	**Turner** (1)		88	7–12	
Mar. 6	vs. North Alabama		Barbara Williams Softball Complex • Montgomery, AL	**L** 5–6	Warhurst (2–1)	**Lehman** (3–5)	None		67	7–13	
Mar. 9	Soluthern		Swanner Field at Geo Surfaces Park • Thibodaux, LA	Game cancelled							
Bevo Classic
Mar. 11	vs. Drake		Red and Charline McCombs Field • Austin, TX	**L** 1–19^{5}	Bedsworth (1–0)	**Lehman** (3–6)	None	LHN	878	7–14	
Mar. 11	vs. Minnesota		Red and Charline McCombs Field • Austin, TX	**L** 9–17^{6}	Pease (6–6)	**Turner** (4–7)	None	LHN	878	7–15	
Mar. 12	vs. Drake		Red and Charline McCombs Field • Austin, TX	**W** 9–2	**Turner** (5–7)	Richards (2–4)	None	LHN	1,098	8–15	
Mar. 12	vs. Texas		Red and Charline McCombs Field • Austin, TX	**L** 0–9^{5}	Simpson (4–2)	**Westbrook** (0–2)	None	LHN		8–16	
Mar. 13	vs. Minnesota		Red and Charline McCombs Field • Austin, TX	Game cancelled							
Mar. 16	at South Alabama		Jaguar Field • Mobile, AL	**L** 0–3	Hardy (4–7)	**Turner** (5–8)	None	ESPN+	274	8–17	
Mar. 23	at No. 23 LSU		Tiger Park • Baton Rouge, LA	**L** 0–12^{5}	Kilponen (10–4)	**Turner** (5–8)	None	SECN+	1,609	8–18	
Mar. 25	at Incarnate Word		H-E-B Field • San Antonio, TX	**L** 4–5	Myers (3–3)	**Lehman** (3–7)	None		123	8–19	0–1
Mar. 25	at Incarnate Word		H-E-B Field • San Antonio, TX	**W** 9–4	**Lehman** (4–7)	Garcia (1–7)	None		123	9–19	1–1
Mar. 26	at Incarnate Word		H-E-B Field • San Antonio, TX	**L** 1–9^{6}	Trapp (3–4)	**Turner** (5–9)	None			9–20	1–2

April (3–13)
Date	Opponent	Rank	Site/stadium	Score	Win	Loss	Save	TV	Attendance	Overall record	SLC record
Apr. 1	at Northwestern State		Lady Demon Diamond • Natchitoches, LA	**L** 0–1	Hoover (8–3)	**Lehman** (4–8)	None		225	9–21	1–3
Apr. 1	at Northwestern State		Lady Demon Diamond • Natchitoches, LA	**L** 3–4	Rhoden (4–3)	**Westbrook** (0–3)	None		204	9–22	1–4
Apr. 2	at Northwestern State		Lady Demon Diamond • Natchitoches, LA	**W** 5–4	**Lehman** (5–8)	Hoover (8–4)	None		201	10–22	2–4
Apr. 8	at Louisiana Tech		Lady Techsters Softball Complex • Ruston, LA	**L** 3–8	Menzina (3–5)	**Lehman** (5–9)	None		390	10–23	
Apr. 9	at Louisiana Tech		Lady Techsters Softball Complex • Ruston, LA	**L** 5–6	Pickett (18–4)	**Lehman** (5–10)	None		398	10–24	
Apr. 9	at Louisiana Tech		Lady Techsters Softball Complex • Ruston, LA	**L** 0–8^{5}	Hutchinson (6–6)	**Turner** (5–10)	None		398	10–25	
Apr. 15	Southeastern Louisiana		Swanner Field at Geo Surfaces Park • Thibodaux, LA	**L** 4–10	Zumo (14–3)	**Lehman** (5–11)	None		411	10–26	2–5
Apr. 15	Southeastern Louisiana		Swanner Field at Geo Surfaces Park • Thibodaux, LA	**L** 2–11	Ladner (4–2)	**Turner** (5–11)	None		287	10–27	2–6
Apr. 16	Southeastern Louisiana		Swanner Field at Geo Surfaces Park • Thibodaux, LA	**L** 1–10^{5}	Ladner (5–2)	**Turner** (5–12)	None		182	10–28	2–7
Apr. 20	South Alabama		Swanner Field at Geo Surfaces Park • Thibodaux, LA	**L** 2–12^{5}	Hughen (1–3)	**Turner** (5–13)	None		123	10–29	
Apr. 22	Texas A&M–Corpus Christi		Swanner Field at Geo Surfaces Park • Thibodaux, LA	**L** 0–16^{5}	Gilbert (6–8)	**Lehman** (5–12)	None		201	10–30	2–8
Apr. 22	Texas A&M–Corpus Christi		Swanner Field at Geo Surfaces Park • Thibodaux, LA	**L** 2–10^{6}	Galvan (3–0)	**Westbrook** (0–4)	None		144	10–31	2–9
Apr. 23	Texas A&M–Corpus Christi		Swanner Field at Geo Surfaces Park • Thibodaux, LA	**W** 3–1	**Turner** (6–13)	Smith (4–7)	None		121	11–31	3–9
Apr. 29	at Houston Baptist		Husky Field • Houston, TX	**L** 0–1	Swanson (7–7)	**Turner** (6–14)	None		241	11–32	3–10
Apr. 29	at Houston Baptist		Husky Field • Houston, TX	**L** 5–6	Cotton (3–9)	**Lehman** (5–13)	Swanson (1)		208	11–33	3–11
Apr. 30	at Houston Baptist		Husky Field • Houston, TX	**W** 1–0	**Turner** (7–14)	Venker (1–8)	**Lehman** (1)		226	12–33	4–11

May (0–3)
Date	Opponent	Rank	Site/stadium	Score	Win	Loss	Save	TV	Attendance	Overall record	SLC record
May 6	McNeese State		Swanner Field at Geo Surfaces Park • Thibodaux, LA	**L** 1–3	Vallejo (15–7)	**Lehman** (5–14)	None		201	12–34	4–12
May 6	McNeese State		Swanner Field at Geo Surfaces Park • Thibodaux, LA	**L** 0–7	Tate (11–9)	**Turner** (7–15)	None		201	12–35	4–13
May 7	McNeese State		Swanner Field at Geo Surfaces Park • Thibodaux, LA	**L** 0–3	Vallejo (16–7)	**Lehman** (5–15)	None		155	12–36	4–14

Postseason (0–2)

Southland tournament (0–2)
Date	Opponent	(Seed)/Rank	Site/stadium	Score	Win	Loss	Save	TV	Attendance	Overall record	Tournament record
May 10	vs. (2) Southeastern Louisiana	(7)	North Oak Park • Hammond, LA	**L** 2–10^{5}	Zumo (19–4)	**Lehman** (5–16)	None	ESPN+	336	12–37	0–1
May 12	vs. (3) Texas A&M–Corpus Christi	(7)	North Oak Park • Hammond, LA	**L** 2–7	Gilbert (9–8)	**Turner** (7–16)	None	ESPN+	372	12–38	0–2

Schedule source:

*Rankings are based on the team's current ranking in the NFCA/USA Softball poll.
