= 2022 Texas A&M–Corpus Christi Islanders softball team =

American college softball season

2022 Texas A&M–Corpus Christi Islanders softball
- Conference: Southland Conference
- Record: 25–27 (11–7 Southland)
- Head coach: Kathleen Rodriguez (1st season)
- Assistant coach: James Rodriguez
- Home stadium: Chapman Field

2022 Southland Conference softball standings
	Conf.				Overall
Team	W		L	PCT	W		L	PCT
McNeese State ‍†‍‡‍^{y}	15	–	3	.833	40	–	21	.656
Southeastern Louisiana ‍‍‍	14	–	4	.778	40	–	16	.714
Texas A&M–Corpus Christi ‍‍‍	11	–	7	.611	25	–	27	.481
Northwestern State ‍‍‍	10	–	8	.556	29	–	22	.569
Incarnate Word ‍‍‍	5	–	13	.278	15	–	36	.294
Houston Baptist ‍‍‍	4	–	13	.235	19	–	29	.396
Nicholls ‍‍‍	4	–	14	.222	12	–	38	.240
† – Conference champion ‡ – Tournament champion y – Invited to the NCAA tournament As of June 5, 2022; Rankings from NFCA/USA Today

The 2022 Texas A&M–Corpus Christi Islanders softball team represented Texas A&M University–Corpus Christi during the 2022 NCAA Division I softball season. The Islanders played their home games at the softball facility at Chapman Field and were led by first-year head coach Kathleen Rodriguez. They were members of the Southland Conference.

== Preseason ==
=== Southland Conference Coaches Poll ===
The Southland Conference Coaches Poll was released on February 4, 2022. Texas A&M–Corpus Christi was picked to finish sixth in the Southland Conference with 82 votes.

Coaches poll
Predicted finish	Team	Votes (1st place)
1	McNeese State	132 (12)
2	Northwestern State	120 (2)
3	Southeastern Louisiana	113
4	Houston Baptist	102
5	Incarnate Word	84
6	Texas A&M–Corpus Christi	82
7	Nicholls	81

=== Preseason All-Southland team ===
==== First Team ====
- Caitlyn Brockway (HBU, JR, 1st Base)
- Cayla Jones (NSU, SR, 2nd Base)
- Lindsey Rizzo (SELA, SR, 3rd Base)
- Ashleigh Sgambelluri (TAMUCC, JR, Shortstop)
- Chloe Gomez (MCNS, SO, Catcher)
- Kaylee Lopez (MCNS, JR, Designated Player)
- Jil Poullard (MCNS, SO, Outfielder)
- Audrey Greely (SELA, SO, Outfielder)
- Aeriyl Mass (SELA, SR, Outfielder)
- Pal Egan (TAMUCC, JR, Outfielder)
- Lyndie Swanson (HBU, R-FR, Pitcher)
- Whitney Tate (MCNS, SO, Pitcher)
- Jasie Roberts (HBU, R-FR, Utility)

==== Second Team ====
- Haley Moore (TAMUCC, SO, 1st Base)
- Shelby Echols (HBU, SO, 2nd Base)
- Autumn Sydlik (HBU, JR, 3rd Base)
- Keely DuBois (NSU, SO, Shortstop)
- Bailey Krolczyk (SELA, SO, Catcher)
- Lexi Johnson (SELA, SO, Designated Player)
- Toni Perrin (MCNS, SR, Outfielder)
- Cam Goodman (SELA, SO, Outfielder)
- Alexandria Torres (TAMUCC, SO, Outfielder)
- Ashley Vallejo (MCNS, SO, Pitcher)
- Heather Zumo (SELA, SR, Pitcher)
- Beatriz Lara (TAMUCC, JR, Pitcher)
- Melise Gossen (NICH, JR, Utility)

== Personnel ==
2022 Texas A&M–Corpus Christi Islanders softball team
Players
Coaches

#	Pos.	Name	Bats/throws	Height	Year	Home town
0	OF	Tiler Noyola	L/R	5 ft 6 in (1.68 m)	Sr	Montgomery, Texas
1	INF	Gabriella Torres	R/R	5 ft 3 in (1.6 m)	So	San Antonio, Texas
2	RHP	Siarah Galvan	R/R	5 ft 6 in (1.68 m)	Fr	Rockport, Texas
4	INF	Jaquelin Garza	/	5 ft 4 in (1.63 m)	Fr	Kingsville, Texas
5	P	Grace Gilbert	/	5 ft 5 in (1.65 m)	Sr	Chipley, Florida
7	INF	Mackenzie Purcell	L/R	5 ft 7 in (1.7 m)	Jr	Kingwood, Texas
8	INF	Paolina Baez	/	5 ft 5 in (1.65 m)	Fr	Fort Worth, Texas
9	RHP	Sydney Hoyt	R/R	6 ft 0 in (1.83 m)	So	Beach City, Texas
10	INF	Ashleigh Sgambelluri	R/R	5 ft 7 in (1.7 m)	Jr	Benbrook, Texas
11	OF	Alexandria Torres	L/R	5 ft 2 in (1.57 m)	So	San Antonio, Texas
13	RHP	Audrey McNeill	R/R	5 ft 7 in (1.7 m)	So	Plano, Texas
14	P	Denay Smith	/	5 ft 6 in (1.68 m)	Fr	Mesa, Arizona
15	C	Haley Morse	R/R	5 ft 10 in (1.78 m)	So	Mansfield, Texas
16	INF	Madison Garza	/	5 ft 7 in (1.7 m)	Jr	Danbury, Texas
17	C	Kayla Keith	R/R	5 ft 8 in (1.73 m)	So	Tucson, Arizona
18	U	Shelbie Fickling	L/L	5 ft 6 in (1.68 m)	So	Hughes Springs, Texas
20	RHP	Beatriz Lara	R/R	5 ft 7 in (1.7 m)	Jr	Orange Grove, Texas
21	RHP	Megan Depew	R/R	5 ft 10 in (1.78 m)	So	Holland, Texas
22	P	Alyssa Aguilar	/	5 ft 4 in (1.63 m)	Fr	Tucson, Arizona
24	C	Angelina Camen	/	5 ft 7 in (1.7 m)	Fr	Tucson, Arizona
26	INF	Kimane Rogron	R/R	5 ft 4 in (1.63 m)	So	Montendre, France
27	INF	Quinn De Avila	R/R	5 ft 8 in (1.73 m)	Jr	West Covina, California
33	INF	Monee Montilla	/	5 ft 7 in (1.7 m)	Fr	Edinburg, Texas
55	INF	Pal Egan	L/R	5 ft 6 in (1.68 m)	Jr	Bakersfield, California
73	RHP	Jenika Lombrana	R/R	5 ft 6 in (1.68 m)	Jr	Humble, Texas

Head coach

Kathleen Rodriguez (Eastern New Mexico)

Assistant coach(es)

James Rodriguez (St. Mary's)

Legend

- (C) Team captain
- (S) Suspended
- (I) Ineligible
- Injured
- Current redshirt

Roster
Last update: 27 June 2022

== Schedule and results ==
Legend
	Texas A&M–Corpus Christi win
	Texas A&M–Corpus Christi loss
	Postponement/Cancellation
**Bold**	Texas A&M–Corpus Christi team member

2022 Texas A&M–Corpus Christi Islanders softball game log
Regular season (23–25)

February (9–10)
Date	Opponent	Rank	Site/stadium	Score	Win	Loss	Save	TV	Attendance	Overall record	SLC record
Aggie Classic
Feb. 11	vs. Western Kentucky		Davis Diamond • College Station, TX	**L** 5–6	Fierke (1-0)	**Depew** (0-1)	None			0–1	
Feb. 11	at Texas A&M		Davis Diamond • College Station, TX	**L** 1–9^{6}	Poynter (1-0)	**Gilbert** (0-1)	None	ESPN+		0–2	
Feb. 12	vs. UT Arlington		Davis Diamond • College Station, TX	**W** 2–0^{8}	**Lara** (1-0)	Adams (0-2)	None			1–2	
Feb. 12	at Texas A&M		Davis Diamond • College Station, TX	**L** 3–11^{5}	Kennedy (1-0)	**Depew** (0-2)	None	ESPN+	1,302	1–3	
Feb. 13	vs. Western Kentucky		Davis Diamond • College Station, TX	**L** 1–13^{5}	Nunn (2-1)	**Gilbert** (0-2)	None			1–4	
Feb. 15	Green Bay		Chapman Field • Corpus Christi, TX	**W** 6–1	**Lara** (2-0)	Baneck (1-2)	None	ESPN+	160	2–4	
Feb. 15	Green Bay		Chapman Field • Corpus Christi, TX	**W** 4–0	**Depew** (1-2)	King (1-2)	None	ESPN+	179	3–4	
Feb. 16	Prairie View A&M		Chapman Field • Corpus Christi, TX	**W** 12–11	**Galvan** (1-0)	Tapia (0-2)	None	ESPN+	145	4–4	
Feb. 16	Prairie View A&M		Chapman Field • Corpus Christi, TX	**W** 7–2^{6}	**Depew** (2-2)	Tapia (0-4)	None	ESPN+	145	5–4	
Whataburger Softball Invitational
Feb. 18	vs. Alabama State		Tarleton Softball Complex • Stephenville, TX	**L** 0–5	Greenlee (2-2)	**Lara** (2-1)	None		112	5–5	
Feb. 18	vs. Syracuse		Tarleton Softball Complex • Stephenville, TX	**L** 1–3	Clark (4-0)	**Depew** (2-3)	None		213	5–6	
Feb. 19	vs. Syracuse		Tarleton Softball Complex • Stephenville, TX	**W** 3–2	**Gilbert** (1-2)	Adams (1-2)	None		143	6–6	
Feb. 19	vs. Alabama State		Tarleton Softball Complex • Stephenville, TX	**W** 14–4^{5}	**Smith** (1-0)	Pye (2-1)	None		76	7–6	
Feb. 20	at Tarleton State		Tarleton Softball Complex • Stephenville, TX	**L** 4–5	Chism (3-0)	**Aguilar** (0-1)	None		389	7–7	
Feb. 23	at Sam Houston State		Bearkat Softball Complex • Huntsville, TX	Game cancelled							
Feb. 23	at Sam Houston State		Bearkat Softball Complex • Huntsville, TX	Game cancelled							
Houston Tournament
Feb. 25	vs. Lamar		Cougar Softball Stadium • Houston, TX	**L** 3–5	Linton (1-3)	**Gilbert** (1-3)	Ruiz (1)			7–8	
Feb. 26	vs. Northern Colorado		Cougar Softball Stadium • Houston, TX	**L** 0–6	Golden (3-3)	**Aguilar** (0-2)	None			7–9	
Feb. 26	at Houston		Cougar Softball Stadium • Houston, TX	**W** 8–7	**Gilbert** (2-4)	Flores (0-3)	None			8–9	
Feb. 27	vs. Northern Colorado		Cougar Softball Stadium • Houston, TX	**W** 10–9	**McNeill** (1-0)	Caviness (0-3)	**Gilbert** (1)			9–9	
Feb. 27	at Houston		Cougar Softball Stadium • Houston, TX	**L** 1–4	Todd (1-1)	**Smith** (1-1)	Lee (1)		350	9–10	

March (3–10)
Date	Opponent	Rank	Site/stadium	Score	Win	Loss	Save	TV	Attendance	Overall record	SLC record
Mar. 2	at Texas State		Bobcat Softball Stadium • San Marcos, TX	**L** 2–6	Mullins (4-3)	**Gilbert** (2-4)	Pierce (1)		389	9–11	
Mar. 5	at Baylor		Getterman Stadium • Waco, TX	**W** 2–1	**Smith** (2-1)	Orme (3-3)	None	ESPN+	713	10–11	
Mar. 5	at Baylor		Getterman Stadium • Waco, TX	**L** 3–5	Binford (1-0)	**Smith** (2-2)	None	ESPN+	713	10–12	
Texas Tech Invitational
Mar. 12	vs. Tulsa		Rocky Johnson Field • Lubbock, TX	**L** 3–8	Pochop (4-5)	**Smith** (2-3)	None		111	10–13	
Mar. 12	at Texas Tech		Rocky Johnson Field • Lubbock, TX	**L** 0–9^{5}	Fritz (6-3)	**McNeill** (1-1)	None	ESPN+	320	10–14	
Mar. 13	vs. Tulsa		Rocky Johnson Field • Lubbock, TX	**L** 4–7	Brown (2-4)	**Aguilar** (0-3)	None		102	10–15	
Mar. 13	at Texas Tech		Rocky Johnson Field • Lubbock, TX	**L** 1–9^{5}	Carlin (3-1)	**Smith** (2-4)	None		302	10–16	
Mar. 22	UTSA		Chapman Field • Corpus Christi, TX	**L** 3–9	Gilbert (3-3)	**Smith** (2-5)	None	ESPN+	176	10–17	
Mar. 25	McNeese State		Chapman Field • Corpus Christi, TX	**L** 4–5^{10}	Vallejo (6-6)	**Gilbert** (2-5)	None	ESPN+	159	10–18	0–1
Mar. 25	McNeese State		Chapman Field • Corpus Christi, TX	**L** 0–9^{5}	Tate (3-7)	**Smith** (2-6)	None	ESPN+	159	10–19	0–2
Mar. 26	McNeese State		Chapman Field • Corpus Christi, TX	**L** 3–9	Vallejo (7-6)	**Gilbert** (2-6)	None	ESPN+	259	10–20	0–3
Mar. 29	Texas Southern		Chapman Field • Corpus Christi, TX	**W** 6–2	**Gilbert** (3-6)	Hernandez (0-1)	None		74	11–20	
Mar. 29	Texas Southern		Chapman Field • Corpus Christi, TX	**W** 7–1	**Smith** (3-6)	Gendorf (7-6)	None		74	12–20	

April (9–4)
Date	Opponent	Rank	Site/stadium	Score	Win	Loss	Save	TV	Attendance	Overall record	SLC record
Apr. 5	at UTSA		Roadrunner Field • San Antonio, TX	**L** 0–6	Harlson (1-0)	**Gilbert** (3-7)	None		98	12–21	
Apr. 8	Northwestern State		Chapman Field • Corpus Christi, TX	**L** 1–2^{12}	Hoover (9-4)	**Gilbert** (3-8)	None		153	12–22	0–4
Apr. 8	Northwestern State		Chapman Field • Corpus Christi, TX	**W** 4–3	**McNeill** (2-1)	Seely (3-5)	None		168	13–22	1–4
Apr. 9	Northwestern State		Chapman Field • Corpus Christi, TX	**W** 5–1	**Smith** (4-6)	Darr (8-3)	None		207	14–22	2–4
Apr. 12	at Prairie View A&M		Lady Panthers Softball Complex • Prairie View, TX	Game postponed							
Apr. 12	at Prairie View A&M		Lady Panthers Softball Complex • Prairie View, TX	Game postponed							
Apr. 15	at Houston Baptist		Husky Field • Houston, TX	**W** 1–0	**Gilbert** (4-8)	Swanson (6-5)	None	ESPN+	211	15–22	3–4
Apr. 15	at Houston Baptist		Husky Field • Houston, TX	**W** 7–0	**Galvan** (2-0)	Cotton (2-8)	None	ESPN+	256	16–22	4–4
Apr. 16	at Houston Baptist		Husky Field • Houston, TX	**W** 2–0	**Gilbert** (5-8)	Swanson (6-6)	None	ESPN+	194	17–22	5–4
Apr. 19	at Texas Southern		Memorial Park • Houston, TX	Game postponed							
Apr. 22	at Nicholls		Swanner Field at Geo Surfaces Park • Thibodaux, LA	**W** 16–0^{5}	**Gilbert** (6-8)	Lehman (5-12)	None		201	18–22	6–4
Apr. 22	at Nicholls		Swanner Field at Geo Surfaces Park • Thibodaux, LA	**W** 10–2^{6}	**Galvan** (3-0)	Westbrook (0-4)	None		144	19–22	7–4
Apr. 23	at Nicholls		Swanner Field at Geo Surfaces Park • Thibodaux, TX	**L** 1–3	Turner (6-13)	**Smith** (4-7)	None		121	19–23	7–5
Apr. 25	at Louisiana		Yvette Girouard Field at Lamson Park • Lafayette, LA	Game cancelled							
Apr. 26	at Sam Houston State		Bearkat Softball Complex • Huntsville, TX	Game cancelled							
Apr. 26	at Sam Houston State		Bearkat Softball Complex • Huntsville, TX	Game cancelled							
Apr. 29	Southeastern Louisiana		Chapman Field • Corpus Christi, TX	**W** 7–0	**Gilbert** (7-8)	Zumo (16-4)	None	ESPN+	171	20–23	8–5
Apr. 29	Southeastern Louisiana		Chapman Field • Corpus Christi, TX	**L** 2–6	Ladner (7-2)	**Smith** (4-8)	None	ESPN+	171	20–24	8–6
Apr. 30	Southeastern Louisiana		Chapman Field • Corpus Christi, TX	**W** 7–6	**Galvan** (4-0)	Ladner (7-3)	None		282	21–24	9–6

May (2–1)
Date	Opponent	Rank	Site/stadium	Score	Win	Loss	Save	TV	Attendance	Overall record	SLC record
May 6	at Incarnate Word		H-E-B Field • San Antonio, TX	**W** 4–2	**Gilbert** (8-8)	Garcia (2-11)	**Galvan** (1)		124	22–24	10–6
May 6	at Incarnate Word		H-E-B Field • San Antonio, TX	**W** 6–1	**Galvan** (5-0)	Floyd (2-6)	None		202	23–24	11–6
May 7	at Incarnate Word		H-E-B Field • San Antonio, TX	**L** 2–3	Trapp (6-8)	**Smith** (4-9)	None		157	23–25	11–7

Post-Season (2–2)

Southland Tournament (2–2)
Date	Opponent	(Seed)/Rank	Site/stadium	Score	Win	Loss	Save	TV	Attendance	Overall record	Tournament record
May 10	vs. (6) Houston Baptist	(3)	North Oak Park • Hammond, LA	**L** 4–5^{8}	Cotton (5-9)	**Galvan** (5-1)	None	ESPN+	225	23–26	0–1
May 11	vs. (7) Nicholls	(3)	North Oak Park • Hammond, LA	**W** 7–2	**Gilbert** (9-8)	Turner (7-16)	None	ESPN+	372	24–26	1–1
May 12	vs. (4) Northwestern State	(3)	North Oak Park • Hammond, LA	**W** 4–3	**Smith** (5-9)	Seely (4-6)	**Gilbert** (2)	ESPN+	242	25–26	2–1
May 12	vs. (6) Houston Baptist	(3)	North Oak Park • Hammond, LA	**L** 3–5	Cotton (6-10)	**Galvan** (5-2)	Swanson (2)	ESPN+	231	25–27	2–2

Schedule source:

*Rankings are based on the team's current ranking in the NFCA/USA Softball poll.
