= 2022 Southland Conference softball tournament =

- Teams: 7
- Format: Double-elimination tournament
- Finals site: Joe Miller Field; Lake Charles, Louisiana
- Champions: McNeese (8th title)
- Winning coach: James Landreneau (4th title)
- MVP: Crislyne Moreno (McNeese)
- Attendance: 3,451
- Television: ESPN+

2022 Southland Conference softball standings
	Conf.				Overall
Team	W		L	PCT	W		L	PCT
McNeese State ‍†‍‡‍^{y}	15	–	3	.833	40	–	21	.656
Southeastern Louisiana ‍‍‍	14	–	4	.778	40	–	16	.714
Texas A&M–Corpus Christi ‍‍‍	11	–	7	.611	25	–	27	.481
Northwestern State ‍‍‍	10	–	8	.556	29	–	22	.569
Incarnate Word ‍‍‍	5	–	13	.278	15	–	36	.294
Houston Baptist ‍‍‍	4	–	13	.235	19	–	29	.396
Nicholls ‍‍‍	4	–	14	.222	12	–	38	.240
† – Conference champion ‡ – Tournament champion y – Invited to the NCAA tournament As of June 5, 2022; Rankings from NFCA/USA Today

The 2022 Southland Conference tournament was held at North Oak Park in Hammond, Louisiana, from May 10 through 13, 2022. The tournament winner, McNeese, earned the Southland Conference's automatic bid to the 2022 NCAA Division I softball tournament. All games were broadcast on ESPN+.

== Format ==
The tournament was a 7 team double elimination format. The top seeded team, McNeese, received a bye in first round competition.

== Seeds ==
Teams were seeded by record within the conference, with a tie–breaker system to seed teams with identical conference records. All seven teams in the conference qualified for the tournament. Tie–breaker procedures were not required.

Seed	School	Conference
1	McNeese	15–3
2	Southeastern Louisiana	14–4
3	Texas A&M–Corpus Christi	11–7
4	Northwestern State	10–8
5	Incarnate Word	5–13
6	Houston Baptist	4–13
7	Nicholls	4–14

- New Orleans does not sponsor a softball team.

== Tournament ==
Round	Game	Time*	Matchup	Score	Attendance	Notes	Television
First day – Tuesday, May 10, 2022|-
1	1	2:00 pm	No. 4 Northwestern State vs. No. 5 Incarnate Word	4–3	191		ESPN+
1	2	2:45 pm	No. 3 Texas A&M–Corpus Christi vs. No. 6 Houston Baptist	4–5	225		ESPN+
1	3	6:05 pm	No. 2 Southeastern Louisiana vs. No. 7 Nicholls	10–2	336		ESPN+
Second day – Wednesday, May 11, 2022
2	4	11:00 am	No. 1 McNeese vs No. 4 Northwestern State	6–5	267		ESPN+
2	5	2:27 pm	No. 6 Houston Baptist vs. No. 2 Southeastern Louisiana	5–8	367		ESPN+
2	6	11:00 am	No. 3 Texas A&M–Corpus Christi vs. No. 7 Nicholls	8–2	372	Elimination game (Nicholls)	ESPN+
2	7	8:15 pm	No. 5 Incarnate Word vs. No. 6 Houston Baptist	4–8	250	Elimination game (Incarnate Word)	ESPN+
Third day – Thursday, May 12, 2022
3	8	4:00 pm	No. 4 Northwestern State vs. No. 3 Texas A&M–Corpus Christi	3–4	242	Elimination game (Northwestern State)	ESPN+
3	9	2:02 pm	No. 1 McNeese vs. No. 2 Southeastern Louisiana	7–6	381		ESPN+
3	10	5:27 pm	No. 6 Houston Baptist vs. No. 3 Texas A&M–Corpus Christi	5–3	231	Elimination Game (Texas A&M–Corpus Christi)	ESPN+
3	11	8:05 pm	No. 2 Southeastern Louisiana vs. No. 6 Houston Baptist	11–7	258	Elimination Game (Houston Baptist)	ESPN+
Championship – Friday, May 13, 2022
4
4	12	12:00 pm	No. 2 Southeastern Louisiana vs. No. 1 McNeese	2–10	331	McNeese tournament champion	ESPN+
4	13		Rematch (if necessary)	–		Not necessary	ESPN+
*Game times in CDT. #-Rankings denote tournament seeding.

== Awards and honors ==
Tournament MVP: Crislyne Moreno, McNeese

All-Tournament Teams: Source:

Crislyne Moreno, McNeese - MVP
Kaylee Lopez, McNeese
Jil Poullard, McNeese
Whitney Tate, McNeese
Madisen Blackford, Southeastern
Aeriyl Mass, Southeastern
Heather Zumo, Southeastern
Caitlin Brockway, Houston Baptist
Madison Cotton, Houston Baptist
Sarah Venker, Houston Baptist
Laney Roos, Northwestern State
Pal Egan, Texas A&M–Corpus Christi

== See also ==
2022 Southland Conference baseball tournament
