= Lexi Smith =

American softball player (born 1996)

Current position
- Title: Pitching coach
- Team: Northwestern State
- Conference: Southland

Biographical details
- Born: August 18, 1996 (age 30); Temple, Texas, U.S.
- Education: Temple College; Texas A&M University

Playing career
- 2015–2016: Temple
- 2017–2018: Texas A&M
- Position: Pitcher

Coaching career (HC unless noted)
- 2019: Texas A&M (GA)
- 2020: Jourdanton HS
- 2021: Southwestern (pitching coach)
- 2022–present: Northwestern State (pitching coach)

Head coaching record
- Overall: 4–7–1 (high school)

Alexis Marie Smith (born August 18, 1996) is an American softball coach and former player. She attended Temple High School in Temple, Texas. She later attended Temple College for two years, before transferring to Texas A&M University, where she pitched for the Texas A&M Aggies softball team. During her junior season in 2017, Smith led the Aggies to the 2017 Women's College World Series first round, where they fell to UCLA, 8–2. Smith was named the pitching coach at Northwestern State University on August 12, 2021.

== Head coaching record ==
Record table
Season	Team	Overall	Conference	Standing	Postseason
Jourdanton Squaws (UIL Class 3A) (2020)
2020	Jourdanton	4–7–1	0–0		
Jourdanton:		4–7–1	0–0		
Total:		4–7–1			
National champion Postseason invitational champion Conference regular season champion Conference regular season and conference tournament champion Division regular season champion Division regular season and conference tournament champion Conference tournament champion
