= Southeastern Louisiana Lady Lions softball =

- 2026 Southeastern Louisiana Lady Lions softball team
- University: Southeastern Louisiana University
- Head coach: Rick Fremin III (8th season)
- Conference: Southland
- Location: Hammond, Louisiana, US
- Home stadium: North Oak Park (capacity: 500)
- Nickname: Lions
- Colors: Green and gold

NCAA Tournament appearances
- 2024, 2025, 2026

Conference tournament championships
- 2024, 2025

Regular-season conference championships
- 2026

The Southeastern Louisiana Lady Lions softball team represents Southeastern Louisiana University in NCAA Division I college softball as a member of the Southland Conference. The Lions are currently led by head coach Rick Fremin. The team plays its home games at North Oak Park located on the university's campus.

== Year-by-year results ==
Season	Conference	Coach	Overall				Conference				Notes
Season	Conference	Coach	Games	Win	Loss	Tie	Games	Win	Loss	Tie	Notes
Gulf Star Conference
1985	Gulf Star	Ken Dohre	38	14	24	0	8	4	4	0	
1986	Gulf Star	Gene Rushing	46	18	28	0	20	5	15	0	
1987	Gulf Star	John Pleasant	38	6	32	0	20	0	20	0	
Independent
1988	Independent	Jacqueline Paddio	34	2	32	0	0	0	0	0	
1989	Independent	Jacqueline Paddio	53	22	31	0	0	0	0	0	
1990	Independent	Jacqueline Paddio	45	24	21	0	0	0	0	0	
1991	Independent	Jacqueline Paddio	45	22	23	0	0	0	0	0	
Trans America Athletic Conference
1992	Trans America	Jacqueline Paddio	49	18	31	0	0	0	0	0	
1993	Trans America	Corrie Hill	47	19	28	0	0	0	0	0	
1994	Trans America	Corrie Hill	53	22	30	1	12	7	5	0	1st Place (T) - West Division
1995	Trans America	Corrie Hill (8-9)/Pete Langlois (11-18)	46	19	27	0	12	5	7	0	3rd Place - West Division
1996	Trans America	Pete Langlois	46	15	31	0	16	8	8	0	3rd Place (T) - West Division
1997	Trans America	Pete Langlois	49	12	37	0	16	6	10	0	4th Place - West Division
Southland Conference
1998	Southland	Pete Langlois	48	31	27	0	26	13	13	0	4th Place
1999	Southland	Pete Langlois	54	25	29	0	26	8	18	0	8th Place
2000	Southland	Pete Langlois	53	21	32	0	26	6	20	0	8th Place
2001	Southland	Pete Langlois	53	31	22	0	27	16	11	0	4th Place
2002	Southland	Pete Langlois	57	30	27	0	31	15	16	0	5th Place
2003	Southland	Pete Langlois	46	15	31	0	27	8	19	0	9th Place
2004	Southland	Pete Langlois	48	23	25	0	25	10	15	0	7th Place
2005	Southland	Pete Langlois	47	20	27	0	27	12	15	0	6th Place (T)
2006	Southland	Pete Langlois	46	10*	36	0	27	6*	21	0	*All wins were vacated due to ineligible players
2007	Southland	Pete Langlois	58	31*	27	0	29	12*	17	0	*All wins were vacated due to ineligible players
2008	Southland	Pete Langlois	52	27*	25	0	29	14*	15	0	*All wins were vacated due to ineligible players
2009	Southland	Pete Langlois	53	20*	33	0	0	8*	22	0	*Six wins were vacated due to ineligible players
2010	Southland	Pete Langlois	48	11	37	0	28	3	25	0	11th Place
2011	Southland	Pete Langlois	52	22	30	0	30	11	19	0	9th Place
2012	Southland	Pete Langlois	49	15	34	0	20	5	15	0	11th Place
2013	Southland	Pete Langlois	54	32	22	0	26	13	13	0	6th Place
2014	Southland	Pete Langlois	48	19	29	0	27	10	17	0	10th Place
2015	Southland	Pete Langlois	52	22	30	0	25	15	10	0	4th Place
2015	Southland	Pete Langlois	52	22	30	0	25	15	10	0	4th Place
2016	Southland	Rick Fremin	55	23	32	0	27	6	21	0	12th Place
2017	Southland	Rick Fremin	55	26	29	0	27	12	15	0	7th Place (T)
2018	Southland	Rick Fremin	59	38	21	0	27	18	9	0	2nd Place (T)
2019	Southland	Rick Fremin	57	34	23	0	27	17	10	0	5th Place
2020	Southland	Rick Fremin	23	15	8	0	3	2	1	0	Season cut short by the COVID-19 pandemic
2021	Southland	Rick Fremin	51	28	23	0	24	14	10	0	5th Place

== National awards ==
- NFCA Golden Shoe Award

Katie Lacour – 2016
Jaquelyn Ramon – 2019

== Roster ==
As of March 6, 2014.

#	State	Name	Position	B/T	Height	Class	Hometown	Previous School
1	(Louisiana)	Megan McCollum	2B		5 ft 3 in (1.60 m)	Senior	Lafayette, LA	St. Thomas More HS
2	(Louisiana)	Mychal Truxillo	OF		5 ft 8 in (1.73 m)	Freshman	River Ridge, LA	St. Martin's HS
4	(Texas)	Vanessa Eng	MI		5 ft 3 in (1.60 m)	Junior	Alvin, TX	Temple JC
5	(Texas)	Brittney Tschoepe	OF/MI		5 ft 10 in (1.78 m)	Freshman	Grandview, TX	Grandview HS
6	(Texas)	Megan Moore	3B		5 ft 6 in (1.68 m)	Junior	Elgin, TX	Elgin HS
7	(Alabama)	Spencer Adkinson	SS/P		5 ft 11 in (1.80 m)	Junior	Headland, AL	Faulkner State CC
8	(Texas)	Caitlyn Fowler	C		5 ft 6 in (1.68 m)	Senior	Fort Worth, TX	Navarro College
9	(California)	Rachael Hellyer	P		5 ft 9 in (1.75 m)	Senior	Folsom, CA	Florida State College
10	(Louisiana)	Amanda Livaudais	OF		5 ft 8 in (1.73 m)	Sophomore	Belle Chasse, LA	Belle Chasse HS
11	(Louisiana)	JoAnna Booty	C		5 ft 8 in (1.73 m)	Freshman	Kentwood, LA	Jewel Sumner HS
13	(Texas)	Tori Sheppard	1B		5 ft 7 in (1.70 m)	Senior	Houston, TX	Cypress Creek HS
14	(Louisiana)	Logane Fuselier	OF		5 ft 6 in (1.68 m)	Senior	Oberlin, LA	LSU-Eunice
15	(Texas)	Brittany Castro	3B		5 ft 5 in (1.65 m)	Freshman	Natalia, TX	Natalia HS
16	(Florida)	Katie Lacour	OF		5 ft 6 in (1.68 m)	Sophomore	Port St. Joe, FL	Port St. Joe HS
17	(Louisiana)	Jessie Browne	OF/DP		5 ft 10 in (1.78 m)	Senior	Zachary, LA	Zachary HS
18	(Florida)	Tori Stamper	P		5 ft 9 in (1.75 m)	Junior	Williston, FL	College of Central Florida
19	(California)	Teresa Lemos	P/UT		5 ft 7 in (1.70 m)	Junior	El Rio, CA	Ventura College
20	(Texas)	Taylor Bishop	P		5 ft 9 in (1.75 m)	Sophomore	Sugar Land, TX	Travis HS
21	(Texas)	Sloan Jenkins	OF		5 ft 9 in (1.75 m)	Sophomore	Katy, TX	Seven Lakes HS
22	(Louisiana)	Emily Moreno	C		5 ft 3 in (1.60 m)	Senior	Baton Rouge, LA	Baton Rouge CC
23	(Louisiana)	Kasey Nielson	IF/P		5 ft 7 in (1.70 m)	Freshman	Prairieville, LA	St. Amant HS
24	(Georgia (U.S. state))	Lacey Fritz	C		6 ft 0 in (1.83 m)	Freshman	Cartersville, GA	Woodland HS
25	(Texas)	Amber Sather	1B/DP		6 ft 0 in (1.83 m)	Sophomore	Kennedale, TX	Kennedale HS

== See also ==
- List of NCAA Division I softball programs
