= North Oak Park =

Stadium in Hammond, Louisiana

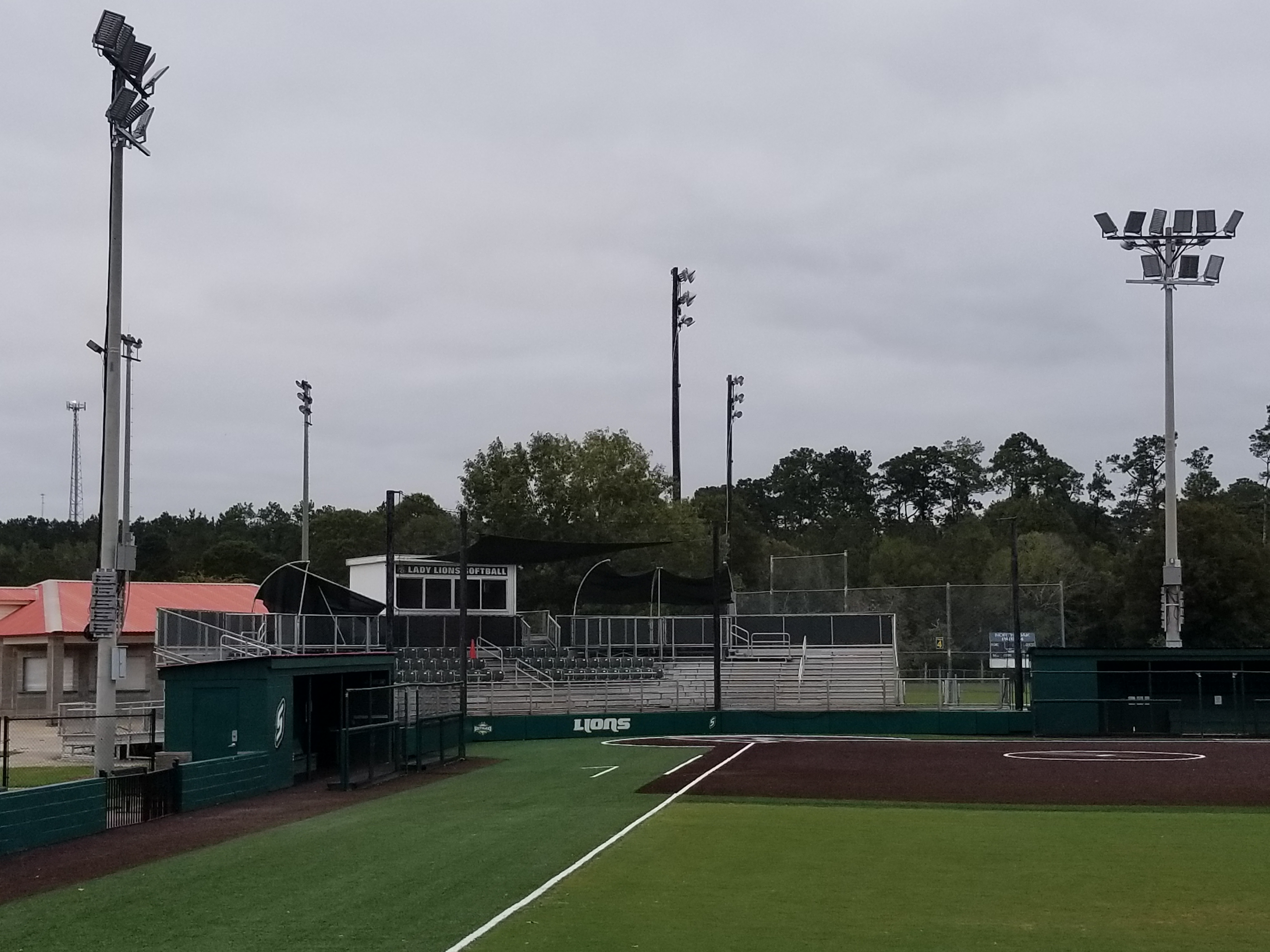
- Interactive map of North Oak Park
- Location: On North Oak St; 1/2 mile north of W University Ave, Hammond, Louisiana
- Coordinates: 30°31′27″N 90°28′34.7″W
- Owner: Southeastern Louisiana University
- Operator: Southeastern Louisiana University
- Seating type: Bleacher seats
- Capacity: 500
- Surface: Grass
- Scoreboard: Electronic
- Field size: Left Field: 198 ft Left Center: 225 ft Center Field: 220 ft Right Center: 225 ft Right Field: 198 ft (Estimated)

Tenant
- Southeastern Louisiana Lady Lions softball (NCAA)

North Oak Park is the home stadium for the Division I (NCAA) Southeastern Louisiana Lady Lions softball team. The stadium is located on the campus of Southeastern Louisiana University in Hammond, Louisiana. Amenities include bleacher seating for 500 fans; field lighting; a brick wall along the foul lines; an electronic scoreboard; dugouts; outdoor batting cages; concessions; restrooms; and locker rooms.

The stadium was the home of 2005, 2014, 2021, 2022, and 2024 Southland Conference softball tournaments. The 2020 Southland Conference softball tournament was also scheduled to be held at the stadium prior to the COVID-19 pandemic cancelled the tournament.
