= 2022 Texas State Bobcats softball team =

American college softball season

2022 Texas State Bobcats softball
- Conference: Sun Belt Conference
- Record: 38–19 (19–8 SBC)
- Head coach: Ricci Woodard (22nd season)
- Assistant coaches: Paige McDuffee; Scott Woodard
- Home stadium: Bobcat Softball Stadium

2022 Sun Belt Conference softball standings
	Conf.				Overall
Team	W		L	PCT	W		L	PCT
Louisiana ‍†‍‡‍^{y}	23	–	4	.852	47	–	13	.783
South Alabama ‍‍‍	16	–	6	.727	26	–	21	.553
Texas State ‍‍‍	19	–	8	.704	39	–	19	.672
Troy ‍‍‍	15	–	12	.556	32	–	20	.615
UT Arlington ‍‍‍	12	–	15	.444	22	–	28	.440
Appalachian State ‍‍‍	10	–	15	.400	29	–	26	.527
Georgia State ‍‍‍	9	–	15	.375	21	–	34	.382
Louisiana–Monroe ‍‍‍	10	–	17	.370	27	–	27	.500
Coastal Carolina ‍‍‍	7	–	17	.292	25	–	29	.463
Georgia Southern ‍‍‍	6	–	18	.250	13	–	34	.277
† – Conference champion ‡ – Tournament champion y – Invited to the NCAA tournament As of June 5, 2022; Rankings from NFCA/USA Today

The 2022 Texas State Bobcats softball team represented Texas State University during the 2020 NCAA Division I softball season. The Bobcats played their home games at Bobcat Softball Stadium. The Bobcats were led by twenty-second year head coach Ricci Woodard and were members of the Sun Belt Conference.

== Preseason ==
=== Sun Belt Conference Coaches Poll ===
The Sun Belt Conference Coaches Poll was released on January 31, 2022. Texas State was picked to finish second in the conference with 87 votes and 2 first place votes.

Coaches poll
Predicted finish	Team	Votes (1st place)
1	Louisiana	97 (7)
2	Texas State	87 (2)
3	Troy	82 (1)
4	South Alabama	74
5	UT Arlington	49
6	Appalachian State	46
7	Coastal Carolina	37
8	Georgia Southern	32
9	Louisiana–Monroe	27
10	Georgia State	19

=== Preseason All-Sun Belt team ===
Preseason Player of the Year Sara Vanderford (TXST, 3rd Base)

Team

- Olivia Lackie (USA, Pitcher)
- Leanna Johnson (TROY, Pitcher)
- Kandra Lamb (LA, Pitcher)
- Jessica Mullins (TXST, Pitcher)
- Kamdyn Kvistad (USA, Catcher)
- Sophie Piskos (LA, Catcher)
- Faith Shirley (GASO, 1st Base)
- Kelly Horne (TROY, 2nd Base)
- Daisy Hess (GSU, Shortstop)
- Sara Vanderford (TXST, 3rd Base)
- Iyanla De Jesus (CCU, Designated Player)
- Raina O'Neal (LA, Outfielder)
- Mackenzie Brasher (USA, Outfielder)
- Emily Brown (GSU, Outfielder)
- Jade Sinness (TROY, Outfielder)

=== National Softball Signing Day ===
Player	Position	Hometown	Previous Team
Emilee Baker	Outfielder	Thorndale, Texas	Thorndale HS
Karmyn Bass	Catcher	Crandall, Texas	Crandall HS
Sydney Harvey	Outfielder	Victoria, Texas	Victoria West HS
Kamden Hutton	Utility	Weatherford, Texas	Peaster HS
Megan Kelnar	Catcher	Hays, Texas	Hays HS
Braylin Pannill	Infielder	Georgetown, Texas	Georgetown HS

== Personnel ==
2022 Texas State Bobcats softball team
Players
Coaches

#	Pos.	Name	Bats/throws	Height	Year	Home town
0	C	Cat Creek	L/L	6 ft 2 in (1.88 m)	Sr	Cypress, Texas
1	OF	Kylie George	L/R	5 ft 3 in (1.6 m)	Sr	Crosby, Texas
2	INF	Dani Elder	R/R	5 ft 4 in (1.63 m)	Sr	League City, Texas
3	U	Hannah Earls	L/R	5 ft 5 in (1.65 m)	So	Willis, Texas
4	RHP	Jessica Mullins	L/R	5 ft 8 in (1.73 m)	So	Tarkington, Texas
6	OF	Ciara Trahan	L/R	5 ft 4 in (1.63 m)	Fr	Santa Fe, Texas
8	INF	Claire Ginder	R/R	5 ft 8 in (1.73 m)	So	Lithia, Florida
10	C	Missy Muras	L/R	5 ft 3 in (1.6 m)	Fr	La Grange, Texas
11	OF	Piper Randolph	L/R	5 ft 6 in (1.68 m)	So	Salado, Texas
12	C	Makayla Hall	R/R	5 ft 9 in (1.75 m)	Fr	Spring, Texas
13	C	Caitlyn Rogers	L/L	5 ft 7 in (1.7 m)	Sr	Magnolia, Texas
14	U	Anna Jones	L/R	5 ft 5 in (1.65 m)	So	Deer Park, Texas
15	RHP	Tori McCann	R/R	5 ft 6 in (1.68 m)	Jr	Round Rock, Texas
16	RHP	Karsen Pierce	R/R	5 ft 8 in (1.73 m)	So	Daphne, Alabama
18	U	Bailee Welsh	L/L	5 ft 4 in (1.63 m)	Fr	Fairhope, Alabama
21	RHP	Presley Glende	R/R	5 ft 8 in (1.73 m)	Fr	Kirbyville, Texas
22	RHP	Kaitlyn Dutton	R/R	5 ft 4 in (1.63 m)	Fr	Mont Belvieu, Texas
23	RHP	Brooke Blackwell	R/R	5 ft 11 in (1.8 m)	Sr	Grandview, Texas
26	INF	Sara Vanderford	R/R	5 ft 6 in (1.68 m)	Jr	Pasadena, Texas
27	INF	Samara Lagway	R/R	5 ft 7 in (1.7 m)	Sr	Willis, Texas

Head coach

Ricci Woodard (New Mexico State)

Assistant coach(es)

Paige McDuffee (UCLA)
Scott Woodard (Western New Mexico)
Ryan Wieligman (Henderson State)

Legend

- (C) Team captain
- (S) Suspended
- (I) Ineligible
- Injured
- Current redshirt

Roster
Last update: 8 June 2022

== Schedule and results ==
Legend
	Texas State win
	Texas State loss
	Postponement/Cancellation/Suspensions
**Bold**	Texas State team member

2022 Texas State Bobcats softball game log
Regular season (35–17)

February (6–5)
Date	Opponent	Rank	Site/stadium	Score	Win	Loss	Save	TV	Attendance	Overall record	SBC record
New Mexico State University Tournament
Feb. 11	at New Mexico State		NM State Softball Complex • Las Cruces, NM	**W** 10–2^{5}	**Mullins** (1-0)	De La Torre (0-1)	None		646	1–0	
Feb. 12	vs. New Mexico		NM State Softball Complex • Las Cruces, NM	**W** 14–2^{5}	**Pierce** (1-0)	King (0-1)	None		575	2–0	
Feb. 13	vs. Oregon State		NM State Softball Complex • Las Cruces, NM	**L** 1–6	Mazon (2-0)	**Mullins** (1-1)	None		113	2–1	
Feb. 17	at No. 13 Oregon		Bobcats Softball Stadium • San Marcos, TX	**L** 3–7	Kliethermes (3-0)	**Pierce** (1-1)	None		502	2–2	
Houston Classic
Feb. 19	vs. McNeese State		Cougar Softball Stadium • Houston, TX	**W** 5–3	**Pierce** (2-1)	Tate (1-2)	None			3–2	
Feb. 19	at Houston		Cougar Softball Stadium • Houston, TX	**W** 8–2	**Pierce** (3-1)	Todd (0-1)	None		1,743	4–2	
Feb. 20	vs. No. 1 Oklahoma		Cougar Softball Stadium • Houston, TX	**L** 0–8^{5}	May (3-0)	**Mullins** (1-2)	None			4–3	
Feb. 20	at Houston		Cougar Softball Stadium • Houston, TX	**W** 8–2	**Mullins** (2-2)	Wilkey (2-3)	None		881	5–3	
Texas Classic
Feb. 25	vs. UTSA		Red and Charline McCombs Field • Austin, TX	Game cancelled							
Feb. 25	vs. No. 23 Arizona State		Red and Charline McCombs Field • Austin, TX	**W** 2–0	**Mullins** (3-2)	Schuld (2-2)	None			6–3	
Feb. 26	vs. Tulsa		Red and Charline McCombs Field • Austin, TX	Game cancelled							
Feb. 26	vs. Tulsa		Red and Charline McCombs Field • Austin, TX	**L** 5–9	Nash (1-1)	**Glende** (0-1)	None			6–4	
Feb. 27	at Texas		Red and Charline McCombs Field • Austin, TX	**L** 2–5	Simpson (3-1)	**Mullins** (3-3)	None		835	6–5	

March (12–8)
Date	Opponent	Rank	Site/stadium	Score	Win	Loss	Save	TV	Attendance	Overall record	SBC record
Mar. 2	Texas A&M–Corpus Christi		Bobcats Softball Stadium • San Marcos, TX	**W** 6–2	**Mullins** (4-3)	Gilbert (2-4)	**Pierce** (1)		389	7–5	
Wildcat Invitational
Mar. 4	Loyola		Rita Hillenbrand Memorial Stadium • Tucson, AZ	**W** 2–1	**Glende** (1-1)	Ruggles (0-2)	**Pierce** (2)			8–5	
Mar. 4	North Dakota		Rita Hillenbrand Memorial Stadium • Tucson, AZ	**W** 10–0^{5}	**Mullins** (5-3)	Jones (2-6)	None			9–5	
Mar. 5	at No. 9 Arizona		Rita Hillenbrand Memorial Stadium • Tucson, AZ	**L** 10–11	Elish (4-1)	**Mullins** (5-4)	None		2,773	9–6	
Mar. 6	vs. Boise State		Rita Hillenbrand Memorial Stadium • Tucson, AZ	**W** 6–2	**Glende** (2-1)	Caudill (7-3)	**Mullins** (1)			10–6	
Mar. 6	vs. Iowa State		Rita Hillenbrand Memorial Stadium • Tucson, AZ	**W** 4–3	**Mullins** (6-5)	Spelhaug (3-5)	None			11–6	
Mar. 9	at Texas A&M		Davis Diamond • College Station, TX	**L** 1–4	Kennedy (6-2)	**Mullins** (6-5)	None		998	11–7	
Mar. 12	Appalachian State		Bobcats Softball Stadium • San Marcos, TX	**W** 5–0	**Mullins** (7-5)	Buckner (5-2)	None	ESPN+	483	12–7	1–0
Mar. 12	Appalachian State		Bobcats Softball Stadium • San Marcos, TX	**L** 2–3	Nichols (3-2)	**Glende** (2-2)	None	ESPN+	483	12–8	1–1
Mar. 13	Appalachian State		Bobcats Softball Stadium • San Marcos, TX	**L** 1–4	Northrop (3-3)	**Mullins** (7-6)	None	ESPN+	408	12–9	1–2
Mar. 15	UTSA		Bobcats Softball Stadium • San Marcos, TX	**W** 4–0	**Mullins** (8-6)	Seith (2-4)	None	ESPN+	337	13–9	
Mar. 16	Baylor		Bobcats Softball Stadium • San Marcos, TX	**L** 0–3	Orme (4-6)	**Mullins** (8-7)	Binford (1)		817	13–10	
Mar. 18	at South Alabama		Jaguar Field • Mobile, AL	**L** 1–2^{8}	Lackie (6-3)	**Mullins** (8-8)	None		36	13–11	1–3
Mar. 19	at South Alabama		Jaguar Field • Mobile, AL	**L** 0–7	Hardy (5-7)	**Pierce** (3-2)	None		407	13–12	1–4
Mar. 20	at South Alabama		Jaguar Field • Mobile, AL	**W** 3–0	**Mullins** (9-8)	Lackie (6-4)	None		352	14–12	2–4
Mar. 23	No. 21 Texas		Bobcats Softball Stadium • San Marcos, TX	**L** 2–4	Dolcini (9-3)	**Mullins** (9-9)	None	ESPN+	988	14–13	
Mar. 25	at Coastal Carolina		St. John Stadium – Charles Wade-John Lott Field • Conway, SC	**W** 8–2	**Mullins** (10-9)	Beasley-Polko (6-5)	None		223	15–13	3–4
Mar. 26	at Coastal Carolina		St. John Stadium – Charles Wade-John Lott Field • Conway, SC	**W** 9–0^{6}	**Mullins** (11-9)	Picone (5-6)	None		307	16–13	4–4
Mar. 27	at Coastal Carolina		St. John Stadium – Charles Wade-John Lott Field • Conway, SC	**W** 9–7	**Mullins** (12-9)	Picone (5-7)	None		315	17–13	5–4
Mar. 30	at UTSA		Roadrunner Field • San Antonio, TX	**W** 5–3	**Pierce** (4-2)	Seith (2-5)	**Mullins** (2)		201	18–13	

April (13–4)
Date	Opponent	Rank	Site/stadium	Score	Win	Loss	Save	TV	Attendance	Overall record	SBC record
Apr. 1	Louisiana		Bobcats Softball Stadium • San Marcos, TX	**L** 0–1	Landry (10-2)	**Mullins** (12-10)	Schorman (2)	ESPN+	562	18–14	5–5
Apr. 2	Louisiana		Bobcats Softball Stadium • San Marcos, TX	**L** 1–10^{5}	Schorman (6-2)	**Pierce** (4-3)	None	ESPN+	575	18–15	5–6
Apr. 3	Louisiana		Bobcats Softball Stadium • San Marcos, TX	**W** 5–4	**Mullins** (13-10)	Schorman (6-3)	None	ESPN+	547	19–15	6–6
Apr. 7	at Sam Houston State		Bearkat Softball Complex • Huntsville, TX	**W** 7–4	**Glende** (3-2)	Bachmeyer (0-2)	**Pierce** (3)		154	20–15	
Apr. 8	at Louisiana–Monroe		Geo-Surfaces Field at the ULM Softball Complex • Monroe, LA	**L** 4–5	Kackley (6-5)	**Mullins** (13-11)	None		436	20–16	6–7
Apr. 9	at Louisiana–Monroe		Geo-Surfaces Field at the ULM Softball Complex • Monroe, LA	**L** 2–10^{6}	Abrams (6-2)	**Pierce** (4-4)	None		465	20–17	6–8
Apr. 10	at Louisiana–Monroe		Geo-Surface Field at the ULM Softball Complex • Monroe, LA	**W** 4–1	**Mullins** (13-12)	Abrams (6-3)	None		448	21–17	7–8
Apr. 12	at Baylor		Getterman Stadium • Waco, TX	Game cancelled							
Apr. 14	Georgia State		Bobcats Softball Stadium • San Marcos, TX	**W** 3–2	**Mullins** (15-11)	Adams (4-8)	None	ESPN+	392	22–17	8–8
Apr. 15	Georgia State		Bobcats Softball Stadium • San Marcos, TX	**W** 8–0^{5}	**Pierce** (5-4)	Buck (6-5)	None	ESPN+	378	23–17	9–8
Apr. 16	Georgia State		Bobcats Softball Stadium • San Marcos, TX	**W** 3–0	**Mullins** (16-11)	Adams (4-9)	None	ESPN+	414	24–17	10–8
Apr. 19	UTSA		Bobcats Softball Stadium • San Marcos, TX	**W** 8–0^{5}	**Pierce** (6-4)	Williams (3-6)	None	ESPN+	416	25–17	
Apr. 20	Incarnate Word		Bobcat Softball Stadium • San Marcos, TX	**W** 12–0^{5}	**Mullins** (17-11)	Garcia (2-9)	None		433	26–17	
Apr. 22	at Georgia Southern		Eagle Field at GS Softball Complex • Statesboro, GA	**W** 2–0	**Mullins** (18-11)	Belogorska (3-10)	None	ESPN+	234	27–17	11–8
Apr. 23	at Georgia Southern		Eagle Field at GS Softball Complex • Statesboro, GA	**W** 5–1	**Mullins** (19-11)	Waldrep (5-12)	None	ESPN+	226	28–17	12–8
Apr. 24	at Georgia Southern		Eagle Field at GS Softball Complex • Statesboro, GA	**W** 11–1^{5}	**Mullins** (20-11)	Belogorska (3-11)	None	ESPN+	185	29–17	13–8
Apr. 29	Troy		Bobcats Softball Stadium • San Marcos, TX	**W** 5–1	**Mullins** (21-11)	Johnson (18-9)	None	ESPN+	453	30–17	14–8
Apr. 30	Troy		Bobcats Softball Stadium • San Marcos, TX	**W** 2–1	**Mullins** (22-11)	Baker (7-5)	None	ESPN+	555	31–17	15–8

May (4–0)
Date	Opponent	Rank	Site/stadium	Score	Win	Loss	Save	TV	Attendance	Overall record	SBC record
May 1	Troy		Bobcats Softball Stadium • San Marcos, TX	**W** 5–2	**Mullins** (23-11)	Johnson (18-10)	None	ESPN+	493	32–17	16–8
May 5	at UT Arlington		Allan Saxe Field • Arlington, TX	**W** 11–2^{5}	**Mullins** (24-11)	Max (4-2)	None		300	33–17	17–8
May 6	at UT Arlington		Allan Saxe Field • Arlington, TX	**W** 7–2	**Mullins** (25-11)	Adams (12-15)	None		318	34–17	18–8
May 7	at UT Arlington		Allan Saxe Field • Arlington, TX	**W** 4–0	**Pierce** (7-4)	Adams (12-16)	None		334	35–17	19–8

Post-Season (3–2)

SBC tournament (3–2)
Date	Opponent	(Seed)/Rank	Site/stadium	Score	Win	Loss	Save	TV	Attendance	Overall record	Tournament record
May 11	vs. (6) Appalachian State	(3)	Jaguar Field • Mobile, AL	**W** 2–0	**Mullins** (26-11)	Buckner (13-11)	None	ESPN+	103	36–17	1–0
May 12	vs. (2) South Alabama	(3)	Jaguar Field • Mobile, AL	**W** 4–2^{9}	**Mullins** (27-11)	Lackie (15-8)	None	ESPN+	278	37–17	2–0
May 13	vs. (1)/No. 25 Louisiana	(3)	Jaguar Field • Mobile, AL	**L** 0–1^{8}	Schorman (15-4)	**Mullins** (27-12)	None	ESPN+	184	37–18	2–1
May 14	vs. (9) Coastal Carolina	(3)	Jaguar Field • Mobile, AL	**W** 3–1	**Pierce** (8-4)	Beasley-Polko (15-11)	None	ESPN+	115	38–18	3–1
May 14	vs. (1)/No. 25 Louisiana	(3)	Jaguar Field • Mobile, AL	**L** 1–7	Landry (20-3)	**Mullins** (27-13)	None	ESPN+	269	38–19	3–2

Schedule source:

*Rankings are based on the team's current ranking in the NFCA/USA Softball poll.
