= 2022 Arizona Wildcats softball team =

Sports team season

2022 Arizona Wildcats softball

NCAA Starkville Super Regional champion NCAA Columbia Regional champion

Women's College World Series, Second Round
- Conference: Pac-12 Conference

Ranking
- Coaches: No. 7
- CB: No. 6
- Record: 39–22 (8–16 Pac-12)
- Head coach: Caitlin Lowe (1st season)
- Home stadium: Rita Hillenbrand Stadium

2022 Pac-12 Conference softball standings
| | Conf. | | | | | | Overall |
| Team | W | | L | | T | PCT | W | | L | | T | PCT |
|---|---|---|---|---|---|---|---|---|---|---|---|---|
| No. 8 Arizona State ‍†‍‍^{y} | 20 | – | 4 | – | 0 | .833 | 43 | – | 11 | – | 0 | .796 |
| No. 5 UCLA ‍‍‍^{y} | 19 | – | 5 | – | 0 | .792 | 51 | – | 10 | – | 0 | .836 |
| No. 11 Washington ‍‍‍^{y} | 14 | – | 10 | – | 0 | .583 | 38 | – | 17 | – | 0 | .691 |
| Stanford ‍‍‍^{y} | 11 | – | 13 | – | 0 | .458 | 39 | – | 22 | – | 0 | .639 |
| No. 23 Oregon ‍‍‍^{y} | 10 | – | 14 | – | 0 | .417 | 33 | – | 19 | – | 0 | .635 |
| Oregon State ‍‍‍^{y} | 9 | – | 15 | – | 0 | .375 | 39 | – | 22 | – | 0 | .639 |
| Utah ‍‍‍ | 9 | – | 15 | – | 0 | .375 | 27 | – | 27 | – | 0 | .500 |
| Arizona ‍‍‍^{y} | 8 | – | 16 | – | 0 | .333 | 39 | – | 21 | – | 0 | .650 |
| California ‍‍‍ | 8 | – | 16 | – | 0 | .333 | 28 | – | 27 | – | 1 | .509 |
† – Conference champion y – Invited to the NCAA tournament As of June 6, 2022; Rankings from NFCA/USA Today

The 2022 Arizona Wildcats softball team represented the University of Arizona in the 2022 NCAA Division I softball season. The Wildcats were coached by Caitlin Lowe, who is in her first season with Arizona. They played their home games at Rita Hillenbrand Memorial Stadium and competed in the Pac-12 Conference.

== Personnel ==
=== Roster ===
2022 Arizona Wildcats roster
| Pitchers: 7 – Hanah Bowen – (redshirt) Senior; 11 – Jessie Fontes – Sophomore; 19 – Madi Elish – Freshman; 34 – Devyn Netz – Sophomore; Catchers: 12 – Bailey Thompson – Grad. Student; 15 – Izzy Pacho – (redshirt) Junior; 18 – Sharlize Palacios – (redshirt) Sophomore | Infielders: 00 – Sophia Carroll – Sophomore; 7 – Hanah Bowen – (redshirt) Senior; 15 – Izzy Pacho – (redshirt) Junior; 20 – Carlie Scupin – Sophomore; 30 – Blaise Biringer – Sophomore; 34 – Devyn Netz – Sophomore; 36 – Amber Toven – Freshman | Utility: 2 – Hannah Martinez – (redshirt) Senior; 9 – Allie Skaggs – Sophomore; 55 – Giulia Koutsoyanopulos – Sophomore; Outfielders: 3 – Allie Enright – Freshman; 6 – Janelle Meoño – (redshirt) Sophomore; 21 – Jasmine Perezchica – Sophomore; 22 – Paige Dimler – Freshman |

=== Coaches ===
2022 Arizona Wildcats softball coaching staff
- Caitlin Lowe – Head coach – 9th season
- Taryne Mowatt-McKinney – Assistant coach – 5th season
- Lauren Lappin – Assistant coach – 1st season
- Ray Camacho – Volunteer assistant coach – 5th season

Note: Season counter accounts for all stints at Arizona.

== Schedule ==
2022 Arizona Wildcats game log (39–22)
Regular Season: 33–20 (Home: 24–10; Away: 6–8; Neutral: 3–2)
Post Season: 6–2 (Home: 0–0; Away: 5–0; Neutral: 1–2)

February: 10–4
| Game | Date | Rank | Opponent | Stadium | Score | Win | Loss | Save | Attendance | Overall | Pac-12 |
|---|---|---|---|---|---|---|---|---|---|---|---|
| 1 | February 10 | No. 9 | Southern Utah* | Rita Hillenbrand Memorial Stadium; Tucson, Arizona | 22–1 (5) | **Bowen** **(1–0)** | Winston (0–1) | — | 1,058 | 1–0 | – |
| 2 | February 11 | No. 9 | Southern Utah* | Rita Hillenbrand Memorial Stadium; Tucson, Arizona | 15–0 (5) | **Netz** **(1–0)** | Owen (0–1) | — | 2,577 | 2–0 | – |
| 3 | February 12 | No. 9 | No. 2 Alabama* | Rita Hillenbrand Memorial Stadium; Tucson, Arizona | 0–11 (5) | Kilfoyl (1–0) | **Bowen** **(1–1)** | — | 2,959 | 2–1 | – |
| 4 | February 12 | No. 9 | New Mexico* | Rita Hillenbrand Memorial Stadium; Tucson, Arizona | 1–0 | **Bowen** **(2–1)** | Guindon (1–1) | — | 2,509 | 3–1 | – |
| 5 | February 18 | No. 9 | UC Santa Barbara* | Rita Hillenbrand Memorial Stadium; Tucson, Arizona | 11–1 (6) | **Netz** **(2–0)** | Snyder (0–1) | — | N/A | 4–1 | – |
| 6 | February 18 | No. 9 | Long Beach State* | Rita Hillenbrand Memorial Stadium; Tucson, Arizona | 7–2 | **Bowen** **(3–1)** | Fernandez (0–1) | — | 2,664 | 5–1 | – |
| 7 | February 19 | No. 9 | Loyola Marymount* | Rita Hillenbrand Memorial Stadium; Tucson, Arizona | 4–3 | **Bowen** **(4–1)** | Perez (1–2) | — | N/A | 6–1 | – |
| 8 | February 19 | No. 9 | No. 16 Kentucky* | Rita Hillenbrand Memorial Stadium; Tucson, Arizona | 6–7 | Sullivan (2–0) | **Bowen** **(4–2)** | — | 2,887 | 6–2 | – |
| 9 | February 20 | No. 9 | Long Beach State* | Rita Hillenbrand Memorial Stadium; Tucson, Arizona | 12–2 (5) | **Netz** **(3–0)** | Quinlan (0–1) | — | 2,634 | 7–2 | – |
| 10 | February 24 | No. 8 | vs. Cal Baptist* | Big League Dreams Complex; Cathedral City, California | 6–2 | **Netz** **(4–0)** | Hernandez (0–3) | — | N/A | 8–2 | – |
| 11 | February 24 | No. 8 | vs. Cal State Fullerton* | Big League Dreams Complex; Cathedral City, California | 0–1 | Sutherlin (2–1) | **Elish** **(0–1)** | — | N/A | 8–3 | – |
| 12 | February 25 | No. 8 | vs. Bethune Cookman* | Big League Dreams Complex; Cathedral City, California | 8–1 | **Fontes** **(1–0)** | Gonzalez (2–2) | — | N/A | 9–3 | – |
| 13 | February 25 | No. 8 | vs. UC Davis* | Big League Dreams Complex; Cathedral City, California | 3–0 | **Elish** **(1–1)** | Fitzgerald (1–3) | — | N/A | 10–3 | – |
| 14 | February 26 | No. 8 | vs. No. 1 Oklahoma* | Big League Dreams Complex; Cathedral City, California | 2–10 (5) | May (5–0) | **Netz** **(4–1)** | — | 850 | 10–4 | – |

March: 9–6
| Game | Date | Rank | Opponent | Stadium | Score | Win | Loss | Save | Attendance | Overall | Pac-12 |
|---|---|---|---|---|---|---|---|---|---|---|---|
| 15 | March 3 | No. 9 | North Dakota* | Rita Hillenbrand Memorial Stadium; Tucson, Arizona | 8–0 (5) | **Elish** **(2–1)** | Jones (2–4) | — | 2,305 | 11–4 | – |
| 16 | March 4 | No. 9 | Iowa State* | Rita Hillenbrand Memorial Stadium; Tucson, Arizona | 11–3 (5) | **Netz** **(5–1)** | Charles (2–1) | — | 2,626 | 12–4 | – |
| 17 | March 5 | No. 9 | Boise State* | Rita Hillenbrand Memorial Stadium; Tucson, Arizona | 5–4 | **Elish** **(3–1)** | Caudill (6–1) | **Netz** **(1)** | N/A | 13–4 | – |
| 18 | March 5 | No. 9 | Texas State* | Rita Hillenbrand Memorial Stadium; Tucson, Arizona | 11–10 | **Elish** **(4–1)** | Mullins (5–4) | — | 2,773 | 14–4 | – |
| 19 | March 6 | No. 9 | Loyola Chicago* | Rita Hillenbrand Memorial Stadium; Tucson, Arizona | 11–0 (5) | **Netz** **(6–1)** | Pepkowski (3–2) | — | 2,700 | 15–4 | – |
| 20 | March 11 | No. 8 | Yale* | Rita Hillenbrand Memorial Stadium; Tucson, Arizona | 5–1 | **Netz** **(7–1)** | Conway (1–2) | — | 2,700 | 16–4 | – |
| 21 | March 12 | No. 8 | UNLV* | Rita Hillenbrand Memorial Stadium; Tucson, Arizona | 7–2 | **Bowen** **(5–2)** | Bressler (9–3) | — | N/A | 17–4 | – |
| 22 | March 12 | No. 8 | Marist* | Rita Hillenbrand Memorial Stadium; Tucson, Arizona | 11–0 (5) | **Netz** **(8–1)** | Myers (4–1) | — | 2,807 | 18–4 | – |
| 23 | March 13 | No. 8 | Marist* | Rita Hillenbrand Memorial Stadium; Tucson, Arizona | 12–2 (5) | **Bowen** **(6–2)** | Pleasants (2–9) | — | 2,630 | 19–4 | – |
| 24 | March 19 | No. 9 | at No. 4 UCLA | Easton Stadium; Los Angeles, California | 0–5 | Faraimo (10–1) | **Netz** **(8–2)** | — | 1,328 | 19–5 | 0–1 |
| 25 | March 20 | No. 9 | at No. 4 UCLA | Easton Stadium; Los Angeles, California | 0–3 | Azevedo (11–1) | **Elish** **(4–2)** | — | 1,328 | 19–6 | 0–2 |
| 26 | March 21 | No. 9 | at No. 4 UCLA | Easton Stadium; Los Angeles, California | 0–7 | Faraimo (11–1) | **Netz** **(8–3)** | — | 556 | 19–7 | 0–3 |
| 27 | March 25 | No. 14 | No. 20 Arizona State | Rita Hillenbrand Memorial Stadium; Tucson, Arizona | 2–9 | Morgan (12–1) | **Bowen** **(6–3)** | Schuld (2) | 2,977 | 19–8 | 0–4 |
| 28 | March 26 | No. 14 | No. 20 Arizona State | Rita Hillenbrand Memorial Stadium; Tucson, Arizona | 0–11 (5) | Lopez (4–1) | **Netz** **(8–4)** | — | 2,925 | 19–9 | 0–5 |
| 29 | March 27 | No. 14 | No. 20 Arizona State | Rita Hillenbrand Memorial Stadium; Tucson, Arizona | 0–8 (5) | Schuld (8–2) | **Bowen** **(6–4)** | — | 2,914 | 19–10 | 0–6 |

April: 12–6
| Game | Date | Rank | Opponent | Stadium | Score | Win | Loss | Save | Attendance | Overall | Pac-12 |
|---|---|---|---|---|---|---|---|---|---|---|---|
| 30 | April 1 | No. 19 | No. 11 Washington | Rita Hillenbrand Memorial Stadium; Tucson, Arizona | 7–12 | Nelson (4–0) | **Netz** **(8–5)** | — | 2,654 | 19–11 | 0–7 |
| 31 | April 2 | No. 19 | No. 11 Washington | Rita Hillenbrand Memorial Stadium; Tucson, Arizona | 5–7 | Moore (5–1) | **Bowen** **(6–5)** | — | 2,668 | 19–12 | 0–8 |
| 32 | April 3 | No. 19 | No. 11 Washington | Rita Hillenbrand Memorial Stadium; Tucson, Arizona | 10–9 | **Bowen** **(7–5)** | Moore (5–2) | — | 2,670 | 20–12 | 1–8 |
| 33 | April 8 | No. 20 | at Oregon State | Oregon State Softball Complex; Corvallis, Oregon | 1–4 | Haendiges (10–2) | **Bowen** **(7–6)** | — | 532 | 20–13 | 1–9 |
| 34 | April 9 | No. 20 | at Oregon State | Oregon State Softball Complex; Corvallis, Oregon | 1–3 | Mazon (12–3) | **Elish** **(4–3)** | — | 593 | 20–14 | 1–10 |
| 35 | April 10 | No. 20 | at Oregon State | Oregon State Softball Complex; Corvallis, Oregon | 9–1 (5) | **Bowen** **(8–6)** | Haendiges (10–3) | — | 540 | 21–14 | 2–10 |
| 36 | April 14 | No. 25 | No. 17 Oregon | Rita Hillenbrand Memorial Stadium; Tucson, Arizona | 11–8 | **Netz** **(9–5)** | Kliethermes (7–4) | **Bowen** **(1)** | 2,669 | 22–14 | 3–10 |
| 37 | April 15 | No. 25 | No. 17 Oregon | Rita Hillenbrand Memorial Stadium; Tucson, Arizona | 3–11 (5) | Hansen (9–4) | **Bowen** **(8–7)** | — | 2,807 | 22–15 | 3–11 |
| 38 | April 16 | No. 25 | No. 17 Oregon | Rita Hillenbrand Memorial Stadium; Tucson, Arizona | 12–4 (5) | **Netz** **(10–5)** | Hansen (9–5) | — | 2,777 | 23–15 | 4–11 |
| 39 | April 19 | No. 24 | UTEP* | Rita Hillenbrand Memorial Stadium; Tucson, Arizona | 9–0 (5) | **Bowen** **(9–7)** | Collins (2–5) | — | 2,461 | 24–15 | – |
| 40 | April 19 | No. 24 | UTEP* | Rita Hillenbrand Memorial Stadium; Tucson, Arizona | 10–2 (5) | **Netz** **(11–5)** | Calderon (2–4) | — | 2,461 | 25–15 | – |
| 41 | April 23 (1) | No. 24 | at Utah | Dumke Family Softball Stadium; Salt Lake City, Utah | 3–5 | Smith (7–5) | **Bowen** **(9–8)** | — | N/A | 25–16 | 4–12 |
| 42 | April 23 (2) | No. 24 | at Utah | Dumke Family Softball Stadium; Salt Lake City, Utah | 8–0 | **Netz** **(12–5)** | Sandez (8–8) | — | N/A | 26–16 | 5–12 |
| 43 | April 24 | No. 24 | at Utah | Dumke Family Softball Stadium; Salt Lake City, Utah | 6–5 | **Elish** **(5–3)** | Smith (7–6) | **Netz** **(2)** | 1,000 | 27–16 | 6–12 |
| 44 | April 27 | | at New Mexico State* | NM State Softball Complex; Las Cruces, New Mexico | 14–9 | **Elish** **(6–3)** | King (6–13) | — | 368 | 28–16 | – |
| 45 | April 27 | | at New Mexico State* | NM State Softball Complex; Las Cruces, New Mexico | 11–0 (6) | **Fontes** **(1–0)** | King (6–14) | — | 584 | 29–16 | – |
| 46 | April 30 | No. 25 | Fresno State* | Rita Hillenbrand Memorial Stadium; Tucson, Arizona | 8–4 | **Netz** **(13–5)** | Hanlon (4–6) | — | N/A | 30–16 | – |
| 47 | April 30 | No. 25 | Fresno State* | Rita Hillenbrand Memorial Stadium; Tucson, Arizona | 5–1 | **Bowen** **(10–8)** | West (4–6) | — | 2,744 | 31–16 | – |

May: 7–4
| Game | Date | Rank | Opponent | Stadium | Score | Win | Loss | Save | Attendance | Overall | Pac-12 |
|---|---|---|---|---|---|---|---|---|---|---|---|
| 48 | May 6 | No. 25 | at California | Levine-Fricke Field; Berkeley, California | 1–7 | Halajian (18–7) | **Bowen** **(10–9)** | — | 283 | 31–17 | 6–13 |
| 49 | May 7 | No. 25 | at California | Levine-Fricke Field; Berkeley, California | 2–9 | Reimers (2–1) | **Netz** **(13–6)** | — | 713 | 31–18 | 6–14 |
| 50 | May 8 | No. 25 | at California | Levine-Fricke Field; Berkeley, California | 5–2 | **Elish** **(7–3)** | Halajian (18–8) | **Netz** **(3)** | 831 | 32–18 | 7–14 |
| 51 | May 12 | No. 25 | Stanford | Rita Hillenbrand Memorial Stadium; Tucson, Arizona | 10–6 | **Elish** **(8–3)** | Vawter (21–11) | — | 2,585 | 33–18 | 8–14 |
| 52 | May 13 | No. 25 | Stanford | Rita Hillenbrand Memorial Stadium; Tucson, Arizona | 0–10 (5) | Krause (11–14) | **Netz** **(13–7)** | — | 2,811 | 33–19 | 8–15 |
| 53 | May 14 | No. 25 | Stanford | Rita Hillenbrand Memorial Stadium; Tucson, Arizona | 3–4 | Vawter (22–11) | **Bowen** **(10–10)** | — | 2,671 | 33–20 | 8–16 |
| 54 | May 20 | | Illinois* | Mizzou Softball Stadium; Columbia, Missouri | 8–3 | **Bowen** **(11–10)** | Sickels (12–9) | — | 2,781 | 34–20 | – |
| 55 | May 21 | | No. 16 (15) Missouri* | Mizzou Softball Stadium; Columbia, Missouri | 2–0 | **Bowen** **(12–10)** | Weber (15–7) | — | N/A | 35–20 | – |
| 56 | May 22 | | No. 16 (15) Missouri* | Mizzou Softball Stadium; Columbia, Missouri | 1–0 | **Netz** **(14–7)** | Weber (15–8) | — | 2,474 | 36–20 | – |
| 57 | May 27 | | Mississippi State* | Nusz Park; Mississippi State, Mississippi | 3–2 | **Bowen** **(13–10)** | Wesley (9–8) | — | 2,209 | 37–20 | – |
| 58 | May 28 | | Mississippi State* | Nusz Park; Mississippi State, Mississippi | 7–1 | **Netz** **(15–7)** | Wesley (9–9) | — | 2,299 | 38–20 | – |

June: 1–2
| Game | Date | Rank | Opponent | Stadium | Score | Win | Loss | Save | Attendance | Overall | Pac-12 |
|---|---|---|---|---|---|---|---|---|---|---|---|
| 59 | June 2 | | No. 7 Oklahoma State* | USA Softball Hall of Fame Stadium; Oklahoma City, Oklahoma | 2–4 | Maxwell (19–4) | **Bowen** **(13–11)** | — | 12,320 | 38–21 | – |
| 60 | June 3 | | Oregon State | USA Softball Hall of Fame Stadium; Oklahoma City, Oklahoma | 3–1 | **Bowen** **(14–11)** | Mazon (17–12) | — | 12,247 | 39–21 | – |
| 61 | June 5 | | No. 14 Texas* | USA Softball Hall of Fame Stadium; Oklahoma City, Oklahoma | 2–5 | Czech (12–1) | **Bowen** **(14–12)** | — | 12,403 | 39–22 | – |

- Win
- Loss
- Postponement
- Bold: Wildcats team member
- Rankings from NFCA.
- (#) Tournament seedings in parentheses.
- * indicates a non-conference game.

== Rankings ==
Ranking movements Legend: ██ Increase in ranking ██ Decrease in ranking — = Not ranked
| | Week | | | | | | | | | | | | | | | | |
| Poll | Pre | 1 | 2 | 3 | 4 | 5 | 6 | 7 | 8 | 9 | 10 | 11 | 12 | 13 | 14 | 15 | Final |
|---|---|---|---|---|---|---|---|---|---|---|---|---|---|---|---|---|---|
| NFCA / USA Today | 9 | 9 | 8 | 9 | 8 | 9 | 14 | 19 | 20 | 25 | 24 | 25 | 25 | — | — | 7 | 7 |
| Softball America | 7 | 10 | 13 | 16 | 14 | 13 | 15 | — | — | — | — | — | — | — | — | 16 | 6 |
| ESPN.com/USA Softball | 11 | 11 | 10 | 16 | 16 | 16 | 17 | 24 | 24 | — | — | — | — | 24 | — | 7 | 7 |
| D1Softball | 15 | 16 | 16 | 18 | 20 | 20 | 22 | — | — | — | — | — | — | — | 9 | 9 | 9 |
