= 2022 Oregon Ducks softball team =

American college softball season

2022 Oregon Ducks softball
- Conference: Pac-12 Conference

Ranking
- Coaches: No. 23
- Record: 33–19 (10–14 Pac-12)
- Head coach: Melyssa Lombardi (4th season)
- Associate head coach: Sam Marder
- Assistant coaches: Nikki Ragin; Alyssa Palomino-Cardoza
- Home stadium: Jane Sanders Stadium

2022 Pac-12 Conference softball standings
	Conf.						Overall
Team	W		L		T	PCT	W		L		T	PCT
No. 8 Arizona State ‍†‍‍^{y}	20	–	4	–	0	.833	43	–	11	–	0	.796
No. 5 UCLA ‍‍‍^{y}	19	–	5	–	0	.792	51	–	10	–	0	.836
No. 11 Washington ‍‍‍^{y}	14	–	10	–	0	.583	38	–	17	–	0	.691
Stanford ‍‍‍^{y}	11	–	13	–	0	.458	39	–	22	–	0	.639
No. 23 Oregon ‍‍‍^{y}	10	–	14	–	0	.417	33	–	19	–	0	.635
Oregon State ‍‍‍^{y}	9	–	15	–	0	.375	39	–	22	–	0	.639
Utah ‍‍‍	9	–	15	–	0	.375	27	–	27	–	0	.500
Arizona ‍‍‍^{y}	8	–	16	–	0	.333	39	–	21	–	0	.650
California ‍‍‍	8	–	16	–	0	.333	28	–	27	–	1	.509
† – Conference champion y – Invited to the NCAA tournament As of June 6, 2022; Rankings from NFCA/USA Today

The 2022 Oregon Ducks softball team represented the University of Oregon during the 2022 NCAA Division I softball season. The Ducks, led by 4th-year head coach Melyssa Lombardi, played their home games at Jane Sanders Stadium as members of the Pac-12 Conference.

== Previous season ==
Last season, the Ducks finished the season with a 14–10 record in conference play and a 40–17 overall record. They finished in third place in the Pac-12. In the postseason, the Ducks were invited and participated in the 2021 NCAA Division I softball tournament, where they lost to Texas State and the #12 national seed Texas in the Austin Regional in Austin, Texas.

== Personnel ==
=== Roster ===
2022 Oregon Ducks roster
Pitchers	Catchers Infielders	Outfielders

=== Coaches ===
2022 Oregon Ducks softball coaching staff
- Melyssa Lombardi – Head coach – 4th season
- – Assistant coach –
- – Assistant coach –
- – Volunteer assistant coach –

Note: Season counter accounts for all stints at Oregon.

== Schedule ==
Legend
	Oregon win
	Oregon loss
	Cancelled/Postponed
*	Non-Conference game
**Bold**	Oregon Pitcher/Player
Rank	NFCA/USA Today

2022 Oregon Ducks game log (26–16)
Regular Season: 8–1 (Home: 0–0; Away: 6–1; Neutral: 2–0)

February: 8–1
Game	Date	Rank	Opponent	Stadium	Score	Win	Loss	Save	Attendance	Overall	Pac-12
1	February 10	No. 18	vs. Ole Miss*	Anderson Family Field; Fullerton, California	3–0	**Kliethermes** **(1–0)**	Borgen (0–1)	—	557	1–0	–
2	February 11	No. 18	at Cal State Northridge*	Matador Diamond; Northridge, California	9–3	**Dail** **(1–0)**	Jamerson (0–1)	—	200	2–0	–
3	February 11	No. 18	at Cal State Northridge*	Matador Diamond; Northridge, California	16–0 (5)	**Hansen** **(1–0)**	Martinez (0–1)	—	200	3–0	–
4	February 12	No. 18	vs. UC San Diego*	Smith Field; Los Angeles, California	10–2	**Dail** **(2–0)**	Williams (0–2)	—	75	4–0	–
5	February 12	No. 18	at Loyola Marymount*	Smith Field; Los Angeles, California	4–1	**Kliethermes** **(2–0)**	Caymol (0–1)	—	75	5–0	–
6	February 17	No. 15	at Texas State*	Bobcat Softball Stadium; San Marcos, Texas	7–3	**Kliethermes** **(3–0)**	Pierce (1–1)	—	502	6–0	–
7	February 18	No. 15	at Baylor*	Getterman Stadium; Waco, Texas	0–3	Orme (3–0)	**Kliethermes** **(3–1)**	—	772	6–1	–
8	February 18	No. 15	at Baylor*	Getterman Stadium; Waco, Texas	8–4	**Dail** **(3–0)**	Binford (1–1)	**Hansen (1)**	400	7–1	–
9	February 19	No. 15	at Baylor*	Getterman Stadium; Waco, Texas	10–4	**Dail** **(4–0)**	Binford (1–2)	—	970	8–1	–

March: 0–0
Game	Date	Opponent	Rank	Stadium	Score	Win	Loss	Save	Attendance	Overall	Pac-12

April: 0–0
Game	Date	Opponent	Rank	Stadium	Score	Win	Loss	Save	Attendance	Overall	Pac-12

May: 0–0
Game	Date	Opponent	Rank	Stadium	Score	Win	Loss	Save	Attendance	Overall	Pac-12

== Rankings ==
Ranking movements Legend: ██ Increase in ranking ██ Decrease in ranking
	Week																
Poll	Pre	1	2	3	4	5	6	7	8	9	10	11	12	13	14	15	Final
NFCA / USA Today	18	12	9	12	11	11	12	12									
Softball America	17	12	11	13	9	9	10	11									
ESPN.com/USA Softball	17	13	11	15	14	13	12	13									
D1Softball	16	11	12	15	13	12	11	13									
