= 2022 Oregon State Beavers softball team =

American college softball season

2022 Oregon State Beavers softball

Stanford Super Regional champions Knoxville Regional champions

NCAA tournament, Women's College World Series
- Conference: Pac-12 Conference
- Record: 39–22 (9–15 Pac-12)
- Head coach: Laura Berg (10th season)
- Associate head coach: Marcie Green
- Assistant coaches: Eric Leyba; Shelly Prochaska
- Home stadium: Kelly Field

2022 Pac-12 Conference softball standings
	Conf.						Overall
Team	W		L		T	PCT	W		L		T	PCT
No. 8 Arizona State ‍†‍‍^{y}	20	–	4	–	0	.833	43	–	11	–	0	.796
No. 5 UCLA ‍‍‍^{y}	19	–	5	–	0	.792	51	–	10	–	0	.836
No. 11 Washington ‍‍‍^{y}	14	–	10	–	0	.583	38	–	17	–	0	.691
Stanford ‍‍‍^{y}	11	–	13	–	0	.458	39	–	22	–	0	.639
No. 23 Oregon ‍‍‍^{y}	10	–	14	–	0	.417	33	–	19	–	0	.635
Oregon State ‍‍‍^{y}	9	–	15	–	0	.375	39	–	22	–	0	.639
Utah ‍‍‍	9	–	15	–	0	.375	27	–	27	–	0	.500
Arizona ‍‍‍^{y}	8	–	16	–	0	.333	39	–	21	–	0	.650
California ‍‍‍	8	–	16	–	0	.333	28	–	27	–	1	.509
† – Conference champion y – Invited to the NCAA tournament As of June 6, 2022; Rankings from NFCA/USA Today

The 2022 Oregon State Beavers softball team represented Oregon State University in the 2022 NCAA Division I softball season as members of the Pac-12 Conference. The Beavers were led by head coach Laura Berg in her tenth season and played their home games at Kelly Field.

== Roster ==
2022 Oregon State Beavers roster
Pitchers: 14 – Tarni Stepto– Sophomore; 15 – Morgan Flesland – Freshman; 24 – Ainsley Lambert – Freshman; 30 – Sarah Haendiges – Freshman; 34 – Mariah Mazon – Senior; Catchers: 2 – Desiree Rivera – Freshman; 35 – Lici Campbell – Freshman; 44 – Harleigh Braswell – Freshman	Infielders: 6 – Savanah Whatley – Freshman; 8 – Xiao Gin – Sophomore; 17 – Grace Messmer – Sophomore; 29 – Kiki Escobar – Freshman; 42 – Frankie Hammoude – Junior	Utility: 11 – Anna Carreon – Freshman; 18 – Kiani Nakamura – Freshman; 21 – Charity Sevaaetasi – Sophomore; 33 – Madison Simon – Sophomore; Outfielders: 3 – Erin Mendoza – Freshman; 5 – Kaylah Nelsen – Freshman; 12 – Eliana Gottlieb – Freshman; 22 – Jade Soto – Sophomore; 88 – Kristalyn Romulo – Sophomore

== Coaches ==
2022 Oregon State Beavers softball coaching staff
- Laura Berg – Head coach – 10th season
- Marcie Green – Associate head coach – 10th season
- Eric Leyba – Assistant coach – 4th season
- Shelly Prochaska – Volunteer assistant coach – 3rd season

== Schedule and results ==
2022 Oregon State Beavers softball game log
Regular season
February (12–3)

Date	Opponent	Rank	Site/stadium	Score	Win	Loss	Save	Overall	Pac-12
Feb 11	vs. New Mexico*		Hillenbrand Stadium • Tucson, AZ	2–3	Linton (1–0)	**Mazon** (0–1)	–	0–1	–
Feb 12	vs. Southern Utah*		Hillenbrand Stadium • Tucson, AZ	8–0^{6}	**Stepto** (1–0)	Winston (0–3)	–	1–1	–
Feb 12	vs. No. 2 Alabama*		Hillenbrand Stadium • Tucson, AZ	1–5	Fouts (1–0)	**Mazon** (0–2)	–	1–2	–
Feb 13	vs. Texas State*		NM State Softball Complex • Las Cruces, NM	6–1	**Mazon** (1–2)	Mullins (1–1)	–	2–2	–
Feb 13	vs. New Mexico State*		NM State Softball Complex • Las Cruces, NM	12–0^{5}	**Haendiges** (1–0)	De La Torre (0–2)	–	3–2	–
Feb 18	vs. South Dakota State*		USD Softball Complex • San Diego, CA	1–2^{8}	Knische (2–1)	**Mazon** (1–3)	–	3–3	–
Feb 18	vs. UC Riverside*		USD Softball Complex • San Diego, CA	1–0	**Stepto** (2–0)	Hilderbrand (0–3)	**Haendiges** (1)	4–3	–
Feb 19	vs. DePaul*		USD Softball Complex • San Diego, CA	10–0^{5}	**Haendiges** (2–0)	Lehman (2–2)	–	5–3	–
Feb 20	at Iowa*		USD Softball Complex • San Diego, CA	7–2	**Mazon** (2–3)	Vasquez (3–2)	–	6–3	–
Feb 20	vs. San Diego*		USD Softball Complex • San Diego, CA	8–1	**Stepto** (3–0)	Rose (2–1)	–	7–3	–
Feb 25	vs. No. 17 Tennessee*		Big League Dreams Complex • Cathedral City, CA	5–2	**Mazon** (3–3)	Rogers (3–1)	–	8–3	–
Feb 25	vs. Baylor*		Big League Dreams Complex • Cathedral City, CA	13–7	**Mazon** (4–3)	Orme (0–1)	–	9–3	–
Feb 26	vs. CSUN*		Big League Dreams Complex • Cathedral City, CA	6–0	**Mazon** (5–3)	Martinez (0–1)	–	10–3	–
Feb 26	vs. Southern Utah*		Big League Dreams Complex • Cathedral City, CA	19–0^{5}	**Haendiges** (3–0)	Winston (1–11)	–	11–3	–
Feb 27	vs. UC San Diego*		Big League Dreams Complex • Cathedral City, CA	2–0	**Stepto** (4–0)	Simpson (3–3)	–	12–3	–

March (14–5)

Date	Opponent	Rank	Site/stadium	Score	Win	Loss	Save	Overall	Pac-12
Mar 4	vs. Sacred Heart*		Amy S Harrison Field • Riverside, CA	8–0^{6}	**Stepto** (5–0)	Lawton (2–3)	–	13–3	–
Mar 4	at UC Riverside*		Amy S Harrison Field • Riverside, CA	9–1^{6}	**Mazon** (6–3)	Heinlin (2–2)	–	14–3	–
Mar 5	vs. CSUN*		Amy S Harrison Field • Riverside, CA	5–0	**Haendiges** (4–0)	Jamerson (2–5)	–	15–3	–
Mar 5	at California Baptist*		Amy S Harrison Field • Riverside, CA	7–0	**Mazon** (7–3)	Schuring (1–1)	–	16–3	–
Mar 6	vs. North Dakota State*		Amy S Harrison Field • Riverside, CA	3–1	**Stepto** (6–0)	Paige (6–2)	–	17–3	–
Mar 7	vs. Robert Morris*		Kelly Field • Corvallis, OR	8–0^{6}	**Mazon** (8–3)	Vatakis (2–2)	–	18–3	–
Mar 7	vs. Robert Morris*		Kelly Field • Corvallis, OR	3–0	**Stepto** (7–0)	Rhinehart (4–1)	–	19–3	–
Mar 11	vs. North Dakota State*		Jane Sanders Stadium • Eugene, OR	11–4	**Haendiges** (5–0)	Schulz (2–3)	–	20–3	–
Mar 12	vs. Portland State*		Kelly Field • Corvallis, OR	1–6	Grey (10–1)	**Stepto** (7–1)	–	20–4	–
Mar 12	vs. Portland State*		Kelly Field • Corvallis, OR	9–1	**Haendiges** (6–0)	Lemos (0–4)	–	21–4	–
Mar 13	vs. North Dakota State*		Kelly Field • Corvallis, OR	3–1	**Stepto** (8–1)	Lainey (2–0)	–	22–4	–
Mar 18	at No. 22 Arizona State		Farrington Softball Stadium • Tempe, AZ	3–5	Morgan (10–1)	**Stepto** (8–2)	–	22–5	0–1
Mar 19	at No. 22 Arizona State		Farrington Softball Stadium • Tempe, AZ	1–9	Schuld (7–2)	**Haendiges** (6–1)	–	22–6	0–2
Mar 20	at No. 22 Arizona State		Farrington Softball Stadium • Tempe, AZ	6–9	Morgan (11–1)	**Stepto** (8–3)	–	22–7	0–3
Mar 21	at Grand Canyon*		GCU Softball Stadium • Phoenix, AZ	6–5^{8}	**Stepto** (9–3)	Hambrick (8–5)	–	23–7	–
Mar 25	vs. No. 25 Stanford		Kelly Field • Corvallis, OR	1–0	**Haendiges** (7–1)	Vawter (11–4)	–	24–7	1–3
Mar 26	vs. No. 25 Stanford		Kelly Field • Corvallis, OR	4–1	**Mazon** (9–3)	Krause (6–2)	–	25–7	2–3
Mar 27	vs. No. 25 Stanford		Kelly Field • Corvallis, OR	0–1	Vawter (12–4)	**Haendiges** (7–2)	–	25–8	2–4
Mar 31	at Saint Mary's*		Cottrell Field • Moraga, CA	11–0	**Mazon** (10–3)	Earle (6–5)	–	26–8	–

April (5–9)

Date	Opponent	Rank	Site/stadium	Score	Win	Loss	Save	Overall	Pac-12
Apr 1	at California		Levine-Fricke Field • Berkeley, CA	4–0	**Haendiges** (8–2)	Archer (6–7)	–	27–8	3–4
Apr 2	at California		Levine-Fricke Field • Berkeley, CA	8–0^{6}	**Mazon** (11–3)	Teperson (1–3)	–	28–8	4–4
Apr 3	at California		Levine-Fricke Field • Berkeley, CA	1–0	**Haendiges** (9–2)	Halajian (13–4)	–	29–8	5–4
Apr 8	vs. No. 20 Arizona		Kelly Field • Corvallis, OR	4–1	**Haendiges** (10–2)	Bowen (7–6)	**Mazon** (1)	30–8	6–4
Apr 9	vs. No. 20 Arizona		Kelly Field • Corvallis, OR	3–1	**Mazon** (12–3)	Elish (4–3)	–	31–8	7–4
Apr 10	vs. No. 20 Arizona		Kelly Field • Corvallis, OR	1–9^{5}	Bowen (8–6)	**Haendiges** (10–3)	–	31–9	7–5
Apr 14	at No. 15 Washington		Husky Softball Stadium • Seattle, WA	3–4	Plain (10–4)	**Mazon** (12–4)	–	31–10	7–6
Apr 15	at No. 15 Washington		Husky Softball Stadium • Seattle, WA	1–2	Lynch (4–3)	**Haendiges** (10–4)	–	31–11	7–7
Apr 16	at No. 15 Washington		Husky Softball Stadium • Seattle, WA	2–3^{8}	Plain (11–4)	**Mazon** (12–5)	–	31–12	7–8
Apr 22	vs. No. 4 UCLA		Kelly Field • Corvallis, OR	5–6	Azevedo (14–2)	**Mazon** (12–6)	Faraimo (4)	31–13	7–9
Apr 23	vs. No. 4 UCLA		Kelly Field • Corvallis, OR	2–3	Azevedo (15–2)	**Haendiges** (10–5)	Faraimo (5)	31–14	7–10
Apr 24	vs. No. 4 UCLA		Kelly Field • Corvallis, OR	3–4	Faraimo (16–1)	**Mazon** (12–7)	–	31–15	7–11
Apr 29	at No. 22 Oregon		Jane Sanders Stadium • Eugene, OR	0–5^{5}	Hansen (11–7)	**Mazon** (12–8)		31–16	7–12
Apr 30	at No. 22 Oregon		Jane Sanders Stadium • Eugene, OR	3–4	Hansen (12–7)	**Mazon** (12–9)	–	31–17	7–13

May (2–2)

Date	Opponent	Rank	Site/stadium	Score	Win	Loss	Save	Overall	Pac-12
May 1	at No. 22 Oregon		Jane Sanders Stadium • Eugene, OR	2–4	Kliethermes (8–5)	**Mazon** (12–10)	–	31–18	7–14
May 12	vs. Utah		Kelly Field • Corvallis, OR	8–7^{10}	**Mazon** (13–10)	Sandez (8–10)	–	32–18	8–14
May 13	vs. Utah		Kelly Field • Corvallis, OR	3–1	**Mazon** (14–10)	Sandez (8–11)	**Haendiges** (2)	33–18	9–14
May 14	vs. Utah		Kelly Field • Corvallis, OR	3–5	Lopez (8–5)	**Haendiges** (10–6)	Smith (1)	33–19	9–15

Postseason
Knoxville Regional (4–1)

Date	Opponent	Rank	Site/stadium	Score	Win	Loss	Save	Overall	Regional
May 20	vs. (2) Ohio State		Lee Stadium • Knoxville, TN	4–3	**Mazon** (15–10)	Handley (22–10)	**Haendiges** (3)	34–19	1–0
May 21	vs. No. 13 (1) Tennessee	(3)	Lee Stadium • Knoxville, TN	0–3	Rogers (12–5)	**Mazon** (15–11)	–	34–20	1–1
May 21	vs. (2) Ohio State	(3)	Lee Stadium • Knoxville, TN	5–1	**Haendiges** (11–6)	Handley (22–11)	–	35–20	2–1
May 22	vs. No. 13 (1) Tennessee	(3)	Lee Stadium • Knoxville, TN	8–3	**Mazon** (16–11)	Rogers (12–6)	–	36–20	3–1
May 22	vs. No. 13 (1) Tennessee	(3)	Lee Stadium • Knoxville, TN	3–1	**Haendiges** (12–6)	Edmoundson (19–8)	**Mazon** (2)	37–20	4–1

Stanford Super Regional (2–0)

Date	Opponent	Rank	Site/stadium	Score	Win	Loss	Save	Overall	Super Regional
May 27	vs. Stanford		Boyd & Jill Smith Family Stadium • Stanford, CA	3–1	**Mazon** (17–11)	Vawter (25–13)	–	38–20	1–0
May 28	vs. Stanford		Boyd & Jill Smith Family Stadium • Stanford, CA	2–0	**Haendiges** (13–6)	Vawter (25–14)	**Mazon** (3)	39–20	2–0

Women's College World Series (0–2)

Date	Opponent	Rank	Site/stadium	Score	Win	Loss	Save	Overall	WCWS
Jun 2	vs. No. 12 Florida		USA Softball Hall of Fame Stadium • Oklahoma City, OK	1–7	Lugo (12–5)	**Haendiges** (13–7)	–	39–21	0–1
Jun 3	vs. Arizona		USA Softball Hall of Fame Stadium • Oklahoma City, OK	1–3	Bowen (14–11)	**Mazon** (17–12)	–	39–22	0–2

- Win
- Loss
- Postponement
- Bold: Beavers team member
- Rankings from NFCA.
- (#) Tournament seedings in parentheses.
- * indicates a non-conference game.

== Rankings ==
Ranking movements Legend: ██ Increase in ranking ██ Decrease in ranking — = Not ranked RV = Received votes
	Week																
Poll	Pre	1	2	3	4	5	6	7	8	9	10	11	12	13	14	15	Final
NFCA / USA Today	—	—	—	—	RV	RV	RV	RV	RV	RV	RV	RV	—	—	—		
Softball America	—	—	—	—	23	23	—	—	—	19	21	21	—	—	—	15	
ESPN.com/USA Softball	RV	RV	RV	RV	24	24	RV	23	22	21	23	RV	RV	RV	—		
D1Softball	—	—	—	25	23	23	—	23	20	19	20	21	—	—	—	—	
