= 2022 UCLA Bruins softball team =

American college softball season

2022 UCLA Bruins softball

Women’s College World Series, 3rd (tie)
- Conference: Pac-12 Conference

Ranking
- Coaches: No. 3
- Record: 51–10 (19–5 Pac-12)
- Head coach: Kelly Inouye-Perez (16th season)
- Home stadium: Easton Stadium

2022 Pac-12 Conference softball standings
	Conf.						Overall
Team	W		L		T	PCT	W		L		T	PCT
No. 8 Arizona State ‍†‍‍^{y}	20	–	4	–	0	.833	43	–	11	–	0	.796
No. 5 UCLA ‍‍‍^{y}	19	–	5	–	0	.792	51	–	10	–	0	.836
No. 11 Washington ‍‍‍^{y}	14	–	10	–	0	.583	38	–	17	–	0	.691
Stanford ‍‍‍^{y}	11	–	13	–	0	.458	39	–	22	–	0	.639
No. 23 Oregon ‍‍‍^{y}	10	–	14	–	0	.417	33	–	19	–	0	.635
Oregon State ‍‍‍^{y}	9	–	15	–	0	.375	39	–	22	–	0	.639
Utah ‍‍‍	9	–	15	–	0	.375	27	–	27	–	0	.500
Arizona ‍‍‍^{y}	8	–	16	–	0	.333	39	–	21	–	0	.650
California ‍‍‍	8	–	16	–	0	.333	28	–	27	–	1	.509
† – Conference champion y – Invited to the NCAA tournament As of June 6, 2022; Rankings from NFCA/USA Today

The 2022 UCLA Bruins softball team represented the University of California, Los Angeles in the 2022 NCAA Division I softball season. The Bruins were coached by Kelly Inouye-Perez, in her sixteenth season. The Bruins played their home games at Easton Stadium and competed in the Pac-12 Conference.

== Personnel ==
=== Roster ===
2022 UCLA Bruins roster
Pitchers: 4 – Holly Azevedo – (redshirt) Senior; 8 – Megan Faraimo – (redshirt) Junior; 12 – Lexi Sosa – (redshirt) Sophomore; 88 – Lauren Shaw – Graduate; Catchers: 18 – Sara Rusconi Vicinanza – (redshirt) Sophomore; 19 – Alyssa Garcia – (redshirt) Sophomore; 25 – Taylor Sullivan – (redshirt) Junior; 26 – Jayla Castro – Freshman	Infielders: 3 – Briana Perez – (redshirt) Senior; 24 – Thessa Malau'ulu – Sophomore; 37 – Kinsley Washington – (redshirt) Senior; 97 – Delanie Wisz – (redshirt) Senior	Utility: 5 – Savannah Pola – Freshman; 7 – Maya Brady – (redshirt) Sophomore; 11 – Seneca Curo – (redshirt) Sophomore; 20 – Anna Vines – (redshirt) Junior; 22 – Taylor Stephens – Freshman; 44 – Kate Blunt – Freshman; Outfielders: 14 – Kelli Godin – (redshirt) Sophomore; 21 – Grace Guzman – Sophomore; 23 – Aaliyah Jordan – (redshirt) Senior; 30 – Lauren Hatch – Freshman; 94 – Lauryn Carter – Sophomore

=== Coaches ===
2022 UCLA Bruins softball coaching staff
- Kelly Inouye-Perez – Head coach – 16th season
- Lisa Fernandez – Assistant coach – 24th season
- Kirk Walker – Assistant coach – 21st season
- Don Slaught – Volunteer assistant coach – 4th season

Note: Season counter accounts for all stints at UCLA.

== Schedule ==
2022 UCLA Bruins game log (51–10)
Regular Season: 43–8

February: 12–3
Game	Date	Rank	Opponent	Stadium	Score	Win	Loss	Save	Attendance	Overall	Pac-12
1	February 10	No. 3	Cal State Northridge	Easton Stadium; Los Angeles, California	22–0 ^{(5)}	**Azevedo** (1–0)	Gardiner (0–1)	—	1,058	1–0	—
2	February 11	No. 3	UC San Diego	Easton Stadium; Los Angeles, California	5–0	**Faraimo** (1–0)	Williams (0–1)	—	407	2–0	—
3	February 11	No. 3	Nevada	Easton Stadium; Los Angeles, California	12–0 ^{(5)}	**Shaw** (1–0)	Clary (0–1)	—	624	3–0	—
4	February 12	No. 3	vs. Mississippi State	Bill Barber Park; Irvine, California	8–0 ^{(5)}	**Faraimo** (2–0)	Willis (0–1)	—	951	4–0	—
5	February 12	No. 3	vs. No. 1 Oklahoma	Bill Barber Park; Irvine, California	1–4	Bahl (2–0)	**Shaw** (1–1)	—	1,000	4–1	—
6	February 18	No. 3	vs. Northwestern	Eddie C. Moore Complex; Clearwater, Florida	4–6 ^{(8)}	Williams (3–0)	**Faraimo** (2–1)	—	4,864	4–2	—
7	February 19	No. 3	vs. Auburn	Eddie C. Moore Complex; Clearwater, Florida	9–0 ^{(6)}	**Azevedo** (2–0)	Lowe (5–1)	—	4,853	5–2	—
8	February 19	No. 3	vs. No. 11 Texas	Eddie C. Moore Complex; Clearwater, Florida	2–1	**Faraimo** (3–1)	Simpson (1–1)	—	4,853	6–2	—
9	February 20	No. 3	vs. Wisconsin	Eddie C. Moore Complex; Clearwater, Florida	5–1	**Azevedo** (3–0)	Justman (1–4)	—	4,724	7–2	—
10	February 20	No. 3	vs. No. 5 Florida State	Eddie C. Moore Complex; Clearwater, Florida	3–4 ^{(8)}	Sandercock (5–0)	**Azevedo** (3–1)	—	4,724	7–3	—
11	February 25	No. 6	vs. Iowa State	Big League Dreams Complex; Cathedral City, California	3–0	**Azevedo** (4–1)	Spelhaug (2–2)	—	–	8–3	—
12	February 25	No. 6	vs. Texas Tech	Big League Dreams Complex; Cathedral City, California	2–1	**Faraimo** (4–1)	Fritz (3–3)	—	–	9–3	—
13	February 26	No. 6	vs. No. 17 Tennessee	Big League Dreams Complex; Cathedral City, California	2–1 ^{(8)}	**Faraimo** (5–1)	Rogers (3–3)	—	–	10–3	—
14	February 26	No. 6	vs. Baylor	Big League Dreams Complex; Cathedral City, California	7–4	**Azevedo** (5–1)	Orme (3–2)	**Shaw** (1)	—	11–3	—
15	February 27	No. 6	vs. No. 16 Missouri	Big League Dreams Complex; Cathedral City, California	7–5	**Faraimo** (6–1)	Krings (5–2)	**Azevedo** (1)	—	12–3	—

March: 16–0
Game	Date	Rank	Opponent	Stadium	Score	Win	Loss	Save	Attendance	Overall	Pac-12
16	March 3	No. 5	vs. Cal Poly	Anderson Family Field; Fullerton, California	9–0 ^{(5)}	**Azevedo** (6–1)	Allman (0–4)	—	175	13–3	—
17	March 3	No. 5	vs. Fresno State	Anderson Family Field; Fullerton, California	12–0 ^{(5)}	**Faraimo** (7–1)	Lung (1–4)	—	300	14–3	—
18	March 4	No. 5	vs. Kansas	Anderson Family Field; Fullerton, California	4–1	**Faraimo** (8–1)	Hamilton (2–5)	—	300	15–3	—
19	March 4	No. 5	vs. Weber State	Anderson Family Field; Fullerton, California	9–1 ^{(6)}	**Azevedo** (7–1)	Ramirez (5–3)	—	350	16–3	—
20	March 5	No. 5	vs. Texas A&M	Anderson Family Field; Fullerton, California	14–2 ^{(5)}	**Azevedo** (8–1)	Ackerman (2–2)	—	800	17–3	—
21	March 10	No. 5	Pennsylvania	Easton Stadium; Los Angeles, California	13–0 ^{(5)}	**Shaw** (2–1)	Longo (1–5)	**Faraimo** (1)	593	18–3	—
22	March 11	No. 5	Cal State Bakersfield	Easton Stadium; Los Angeles, California	14–0 ^{(5)}	**Faraimo** (9–1)	Kennedy (1–2)	—	660	19–3	—
23	March 11	No. 5	Fresno State*	Easton Stadium; Los Angeles, California	8–2	**Azevedo** (9–1)	Hanlon (0–2)	—	660	20–3	—
24	March 11	No. 5	Fresno State*	Easton Stadium; Los Angeles, California	12–0 ^{(5)}	**Shaw** (3–1)	West (1–10)	—	1,050	21–3	—
25	March 11	No. 5	Cal State Bakersfield*	Easton Stadium; Los Angeles, California	17–1 ^{(5)}	**Azevedo** (10–1)	Castillo (1–4)	—	1,050	22–3	—
26	March 19	No. 4	No. 9 Arizona	Easton Stadium; Los Angeles, CA	5–0	**Faraimo** (10–1)	Netz (8–2)	—	1,328	23–3	1–0
27	March 20	No. 4	No. 9 Arizona	Easton Stadium; Los Angeles, California	3–0	**Azevedo** (11–1)	Elish (4–2)	—	1,328	24–3	2–0
28	March 21	No. 4	No. 9 Arizona	Easton Stadium; Los Angeles, California	7–0	**Faraimo** (11–1)	Netz (8–3)	**Shaw** (2)	556	25–3	3–0
29	March 25	No. 3	at No. 9 Washington	Husky Softball Stadium; Seattle, Washington	3–2	**Faraimo** (12–1)	Plain (9–4)	—	1,430	26–3	4–0
30	March 26	No. 3	at No. 9 Washington	Husky Softball Stadium; Seattle, Washington	4–0	**Azevedo** (12–1)	Lynch (3–3)	**Faraimo** (2)	1,696	27–3	5–0
31	March 27	No. 3	at No. 9 Washington	Husky Softball Stadium; Seattle, Washington	5–4	**Faraimo** (13–1)	Willis (1–2)	—	1,734	28–3	6–0

April: 11–2
Game	Date	Rank	Opponent	Stadium	Score	Win	Loss	Save	Attendance	Overall	Pac-12
32	April 1	No. 3	No. 12 Oregon	Easton Stadium; Los Angeles, California	3–1	**Faraimo** (14–1)	Hansen (8–1)	—	1,328	29–3	7–0
33	April 2	No. 3	No. 12 Oregon	Easton Stadium; Los Angeles, California	5–2	**Azevedo** (13–1)	Dail (7–4)	—	1,328	30–3	8–0
34	April 3	No. 3	No. 12 Oregon	Easton Stadium; Los Angeles, California	4–2	**Shaw** (4–1)	Hansen (8–2)	**Faraimo** (3)	1,328	31–3	9–0
35	April 8	No. 3	at Stanford	Boyd & Jill Smith Family Stadium; Stanford, California	3–1 ^{(8)}	**Faraimo** (15–1)	Vawter (15–5)	—	1,046	32–3	10–0
36	April 9	No. 3	at Stanford	Boyd & Jill Smith Family Stadium; Stanford, California	0–1	Krause (7–3)	**Azevedo** (13–2)	—	1,002	32–4	10–1
37	April 10	No. 3	at Stanford	Boyd & Jill Smith Family Stadium; Stanford, California	0–1	Vawter (16–5)	**Shaw** (4–2)	—	1,015	32–5	10–2
38	April 19	No. 4	San Diego	Easton Stadium; Los Angeles, California	8–1	**Shaw** (5–2)	Earnshaw (9–7)	**Sosa** (1)	425	33–5	–
39	April 22	No. 4	at Oregon State	Oregon State Softball Complex; Corvallis, Oregon	6–5	**Azevedo** (14–2)	Mazon (12–6)	**Faraimo** (4)	503	34–5	11–2
40	April 23	No. 4	at Oregon State	Oregon State Softball Complex; Corvallis, Oregon	3–2	**Azevedo** (15–2)	Haendiges (10–5)	**Faraimo** (5)	848	35–5	12–2
41	April 24	No. 4	at Oregon State	Oregon State Softball Complex; Corvallis, Oregon	4–3	**Faraimo** (16–1)	Mazon (12–7)	—	662	36–5	13–2
42	April 29	No. 3	Cal State Fullerton	Easton Stadium; Los Angeles, California	13–0 ^{(5)}	**Shaw** (6–2)	Chambers (3–3)	—	780	37–5	–
43	April 29	No. 3	Utah	Easton Stadium; Los Angeles, California	1–0	**Faraimo** (17–1)	Sandez (8–9)	—	1,035	38–5	14–2
44	April 30	No. 3	Utah	Easton Stadium; Los Angeles, California	2–0	**Azevedo** (16–2)	Lopez (5–5)	**Faraimo** (6)	1,112	39–5	15–2

May: 4–3
Game	Date	Rank	Opponent	Stadium	Score	Win	Loss	Save	Attendance	Overall	Pac-12
45	May 1	No. 3	Utah	Easton Stadium; Los Angeles, California	0–8 ^{(5)}	Smith (9–6)	**Faraimo** (17–2)	—	1,025	39–6	15–3
46	May 6	No. 4	at No. 12 Arizona State	Alberta B. Farrington Softball Stadium; Tempe, Arizona	1–6	Lopez (10–2)	**Faraimo** (17–3)	—	1,851	39–7	15–4
47	May 7	No. 4	at No. 12 Arizona State	Alberta B. Farrington Softball Stadium; Tempe, Arizona	9–3	**Faraimo** (18–3)	Morgan (15–3)	—	1,888	40–7	16–4
48	May 8	No. 4	at No. 12 Arizona State	Alberta B. Farrington Softball Stadium; Tempe, Arizona	3–6	Lopez (11–2)	**Faraimo** (18–4)	—	1,680	40–8	16–5
49	May 12	No. 6	California	Easton Stadium; Los Angeles, California	8–0 ^{(6)}	**Azevedo** (17–2)	Halajian (18–9)	—	922	41–8	17–5
50	May 13	No. 6	California	Easton Stadium; Los Angeles, California	10–4	**Faraimo** (19–4)	Archer (6–11)	—	1,002	42–8	18–5
51	May 14	No. 6	California	Easton Stadium; Los Angeles, California	5–0	**Faraimo** (20–4)	Halajian (18–10)	—	1,108	43–8	19–5

Post-Season (8–2)

Los Angeles Regional (3–0)
Date	Rank/Seed	Opponent	Site/Stadium	Score	Win	Loss	Save	Attendance	Overall Record	Regional Record
May 20	No. 5 (1)	(4) Grand Canyon	Easton Stadium	12–1 ^{(5)}	**Azevedo** (18–2)	Thompson (20–6)	—	1,328	44–8	1–0
May 21	No. 5 (1)	(3) Loyola Marymount	Easton Stadium	7–1	**Faraimo** (21–4)	Perez (18–7)	—	1,328	45–8	2–0
May 22	No. 5 (1)	(2) Ole Miss	Easton Stadium	9–1 ^{(5)}	**Azevedo** (19–2)	Borgen (7–11)	—	1,328	46–8	3–0

Los Angeles Super Regional (2–0)
Date	Rank/Seed	Opponent	Site/Stadium	Score	Win	Loss	Save	Attendance	Overall Record	Super Regional Record
May 27	No. 5 (2)	No. 9 (12) Duke	Easton Stadium	3–2	**Faraimo** (22–4)	Wright (13–5)	—	1,242	47–8	1–0
May 28	No. 5 (2)	No. 9 (12) Duke	Easton Stadium	8–2	**Azevedo** (20–2)	St. George (22–4)	**Faraimo** (7)	1,305	48–8	2–0

Women's College World Series (3–2)
Date	Rank/Seed	Opponent	Site/Stadium	Score	Win	Loss	Save	Attendance	Overall Record	WCWS Record
June 2	No. 5 (2)	vs. No. 16 Texas	Devon Park; Oklahoma City, Oklahoma	2–7	Dolcini (23–10)	**Faraimo** (22–5)	—	—	48–9	0–1
June 3	No. 5 (2)	vs. No. 10 (9) Northwestern	Devon Park	6–1	**Faraimo** (23–5)	Williams (31–6)	—	—	49–9	1–1
June 5	No. 5 (2)	vs. No. 12 (14) Florida	Devon Park	8–0 ^{(6)}	**Azevedo** (21–2)	Hightower (17–9)	—	—	50–9	2–1
June 6	No. 5 (2)	vs. No. 1 (1) Oklahoma	Devon Park	7–3	**Faraimo** (24–5)	May (15–1)	**Azevedo** (2)	—	51–9	3–1
June 6	No. 5 (2)	vs. No. 1 (1) Oklahoma	Devon Park	0–15 ^{(5)}	Trautwein (21–1)	**Azevedo** (21–3)	—	11,836	51–10	3–2

- Win
- Loss
- Postponement
- Bold: Bruins team member
- Rankings from NFCA.
- (#) Tournament seedings in parentheses.

== Rankings ==
Ranking movements Legend: ██ Increase in ranking ██ Decrease in ranking ( ) = First-place votes
	Week																
Poll	Pre	1	2	3	4	5	6	7	8	9	10	11	12	13	14	15	Final
NFCA / USA Today	3	3	6	5	5	4	3	3	3	5	4	3	4	6	5	5	3
Softball America	4	3	6	5	5	3	3	3	3	5	5	4	5	7	5	4	4
ESPN.com/USA Softball	3	3	6	5	5 (1)	3 (1)	2 (1)	2 (1)	2 (2)	5	4	3	4	6	6	6	3
D1Softball	4	4	6	5	5	3	2	2	2	5	5	4	5	8	8	8	2

== Awards and honors ==
=== All-tournament Team ===
The following players were members of the Women's College World Series All-Tournament Team.

- Megan Faraimo
- Delanie Wisz
- Maya Brady
