= 2022 Washington Huskies softball team =

American college softball season

2022 Washington Huskies softball
- Conference: Pac-12 Conference

Ranking
- Coaches: No. 11
- Record: 38–17 (14–10 Pac-12)
- Head coach: Heather Tarr (18th season)
- Home stadium: Husky Softball Stadium

2022 Pac-12 Conference softball standings
	Conf.						Overall
Team	W		L		T	PCT	W		L		T	PCT
No. 8 Arizona State ‍†‍‍^{y}	20	–	4	–	0	.833	43	–	11	–	0	.796
No. 5 UCLA ‍‍‍^{y}	19	–	5	–	0	.792	51	–	10	–	0	.836
No. 11 Washington ‍‍‍^{y}	14	–	10	–	0	.583	38	–	17	–	0	.691
Stanford ‍‍‍^{y}	11	–	13	–	0	.458	39	–	22	–	0	.639
No. 23 Oregon ‍‍‍^{y}	10	–	14	–	0	.417	33	–	19	–	0	.635
Oregon State ‍‍‍^{y}	9	–	15	–	0	.375	39	–	22	–	0	.639
Utah ‍‍‍	9	–	15	–	0	.375	27	–	27	–	0	.500
Arizona ‍‍‍^{y}	8	–	16	–	0	.333	39	–	21	–	0	.650
California ‍‍‍	8	–	16	–	0	.333	28	–	27	–	1	.509
† – Conference champion y – Invited to the NCAA tournament As of June 6, 2022; Rankings from NFCA/USA Today

The 2022 Washington Huskies softball team represented the University of Washington in the 2022 NCAA Division I softball season. The Huskies were coached by Heather Tarr, in her eighteenth season. The Huskies played their home games at Husky Softball Stadium and competed in the Pac-12 Conference.

== Personnel ==
=== Roster ===
2022 Washington Huskies roster
Pitchers Catchers	Infielders	Utility Outfielders

=== Coaches ===
2022 Washington Huskies softball coaching staff
- Heather Tarr – Head coach – 18th season
- Lance Glasoe – Assistant coach – 12th season
- Kyle Nobach – Assistant coach – 1st season
- Ashley Carter – Volunteer assistant coach – 1st season
- Sis Bates – Student assistant coach – 1st season
- Carter Pierce – Student manager – 3rd season
- Anna Vest – Graduate manager – 1st season

Note: Season counter accounts for all stints at Washington.

== Schedule ==
Legend
	Washington win
	Washington loss
	Cancelled/Postponed
*	Non-Conference
**Bold**	Washington Pitcher/Player
Rank	NFCA/USA Today

2022 Washington Huskies game log (22–11)
Regular Season: 22–11 (Home: 1–3; Away: 5–3; Neutral: 16–5)

February: 11–4
Game	Date	Rank	Opponent	Stadium	Score	Win	Loss	Save	Attendance	Overall	Pac-12
11	February 25	No. 5	vs. San Diego State*	Big League Dreams Complex; Cathedral City, California	5–7	Martinez (3–1)	**Lynch** **(1–1)**	Hernandez (3)	299	10–1	–
12	February 25	No. 5	vs. Loyola Marymount*	Big League Dreams Complex; Cathedral City, California	2–0	**Plain** **(5–1)**	Perez (1–3)	—	299	11–1	–
13	February 26	No. 5	vs. No. 16 Missouri*	Big League Dreams Complex; Cathedral City, California	0–10 (5)	Krings (5–1)	**Plain** **(5–2)**	—	700	11–2	–
14	February 26	No. 5	vs. No. 18 Northwestern*	Big League Dreams Complex; Cathedral City, California	0–1	Williams (7–1)	**Lynch** **(1–2)**	—	700	11–3	–
15	February 27	No. 5	vs. Iowa State*	Big League Dreams Complex; Cathedral City, California	1–0	**Plain** **(6–2)**	Spelhaug (3–3)	—	716	11–4	–

March: 9–6
Game	Date	Rank	Opponent	Stadium	Score	Win	Loss	Save	Attendance	Overall	Pac-12
16	March 4	No. 7	vs. New Mexico State*	Eller Media Stadium; Las Vegas, Nevada	14–3 (5)	**Plain** **(7–3)**	Patane (0–2)	—	390	12–4	–
17	March 4	No. 7	vs. Houston*	Eller Media Stadium; Las Vegas, Nevada	4–5 (8)	Wilkey (3–4)	**Willis** **(1–1)**	—	390	12–5	–
18	March 5	No. 7	vs. Houston*	Eller Media Stadium; Las Vegas, Nevada	10–4	**Moore** **(3–0)**	Flores (1–4)	—	731	13–5	–
19	March 5	No. 7	at UNLV*	Eller Media Stadium; Las Vegas, Nevada	6–1	**Plain** **(8–2)**	Bressler (8–2)	—	731	14–5	–
20	March 6	No. 7	vs. New Mexico State*	Eller Media Stadium; Las Vegas, Nevada	14–0 (5)	**Lynch** **(2–2)**	De La Torre (1–7)	—	330	15–5	–
21	March 8	No. 7	Robert Morris*	Husky Softball Stadium; Seattle, Washington	11–0 (5)	**Nelson** **(2–0)**	Vatakis (2–3)	—	1,404	16–5	–
22	March 12	No. 7	vs. Northern Colorado*	Ram Field; Fort Collins, CO	15–2 (5)	**Lynch** **(3–2)**	DiNapoli (1–5)	—	277	17–5	–
23	March 12	No. 7	at Colorado State*	Ram Field; Fort Collins, CO	6–3	**Plain** **(9–2)**	Hornbuckle (1–5)	—	890	18–5	–
24	March 13	No. 7	vs. Northern Colorado*	Ram Field; Fort Collins, CO	9–0 (5)	**Nelson** **(3–0)**	Caviness (1–4)	—	156	19–5	–
25	March 18	No. 7	at California	Levine-Fricke Field; Berkeley, CA	4–2	**Moore** **(4–0)**	Archer (6–5)	—	362	20–5	1–0
26	March 19	No. 7	at California	Levine-Fricke Field; Berkeley, CA	3–4	Halajian (11–2)	**Moore** **(4–1)**	—	670	20–6	1–1
27	March 20	No. 7	at California	Levine-Fricke Field; Berkeley, CA	5–6	Halajian (12–2)	**Plain** **(9–3)**	—	887	20–7	1–2
28	March 25	No. 9	No. 3 UCLA	Husky Softball Stadium; Seattle, WA	2–3	Faraimo (12–1)	**Plain** **(9–4)**	—	1,430	20–8	1–3
29	March 26	No. 9	No. 3 UCLA	Husky Softball Stadium; Seattle, WA	0–4	Azevedo (12–1)	**Lynch** **(3–3)**	Faraimo (2)	1,696	20–9	1–4
30	March 27	No. 9	No. 3 UCLA	Husky Softball Stadium; Seattle, WA	4–5	Faraimo (13–1)	**Willis** **(1–2)**	—	1,734	20–10	1–5

April: 2–1
Game	Date	Rank	Opponent	Stadium	Score	Win	Loss	Save	Attendance	Overall	Pac-12
31	April 1	No. 11	at No. 19 Arizona	Rita Hillenbrand Stadium; Tucson, Arizona	12–7	**Nelson** **(4–0)**	Netz (8–5)	—	2,654	21–10	2–5
32	April 2	No. 11	at No. 19 Arizona	Rita Hillenbrand Stadium; Tucson, Arizona	7–5	**Moore** **(5–1)**	Bowen (6–5)	—	2,668	22–10	3–5
33	April 3	No. 11	at No. 19 Arizona	Rita Hillenbrand Stadium; Tucson, Arizona	9–10	Bowen (7–5)	**Moore** **(5–2)**	—	2,670	22–11	3–6
34	April 12		at Seattle*	Logan Field; Seattle, Washington	—					—	N/A
35	April 14		Oregon State	Husky Softball Stadium; Seattle, Washington	—					—	–
36	April 15		Oregon State	Husky Softball Stadium; Seattle, Washington	—					—	–
37	April 16		Oregon State	Husky Softball Stadium; Seattle, Washington	—					—	–
38	April 22		at Oregon	Jane Sanders Stadium; Eugene, Oregon	—					—	–
39	April 23		at Oregon	Jane Sanders Stadium; Eugene, Oregon	—					—	–
40	April 24		at Oregon	Jane Sanders Stadium; Eugene, Oregon	—					—	–
41	April 29		Stanford	Husky Softball Stadium; Seattle, Washington	—					—	–
42	April 30		Stanford	Husky Softball Stadium; Seattle, Washington	—					—	–

May: 0–0
Game	Date	Rank	Opponent	Stadium	Score	Win	Loss	Save	Attendance	Overall	Pac-12
43	May 1		Stanford	Husky Softball Stadium; Seattle, Washington	—					—	–
44	May 6		at Utah	Dumke Family Softball Stadium; Salt Lake City, Utah	—					—	–
45	May 7		at Utah	Dumke Family Softball Stadium; Salt Lake City, Utah	—					—	–
46	May 8		at Utah	Dumke Family Softball Stadium; Salt Lake City, Utah	—					—	–
47	May 12		Arizona State	Husky Softball Stadium; Seattle, Washington	—					—	–
48	May 13		Arizona State	Husky Softball Stadium; Seattle, Washington	—					—	–
49	May 14		Arizona State	Husky Softball Stadium; Seattle, Washington	—					—	–

== Rankings ==
Ranking movements Legend: ██ Increase in ranking ██ Decrease in ranking
	Week																
Poll	Pre	1	2	3	4	5	6	7	8	9	10	11	12	13	14	15	Final
NFCA / USA Today	7	6	5	7	7	7	9	11	11								
Softball America	8	7	5	7	10	10	11	16	16								
ESPN.com/USA Softball	7	5	5	7	7	7	11	14	15								
D1Softball	7	6	5	10	11	10	15	16	16								
