= 2022 Arizona State Sun Devils softball team =

American college softball season

2022 Arizona State Sun Devils softball

Pac-12 champions
- Conference: Pac-12 Conference

Ranking
- Coaches: No. 13
- Record: 43–11 (20–4 Pac-12)
- Head coach: Trisha Ford (6th season)
- Home stadium: Alberta B. Farrington Softball Stadium

2022 Pac-12 Conference softball standings
	Conf.						Overall
Team	W		L		T	PCT	W		L		T	PCT
No. 8 Arizona State ‍†‍‍^{y}	20	–	4	–	0	.833	43	–	11	–	0	.796
No. 5 UCLA ‍‍‍^{y}	19	–	5	–	0	.792	51	–	10	–	0	.836
No. 11 Washington ‍‍‍^{y}	14	–	10	–	0	.583	38	–	17	–	0	.691
Stanford ‍‍‍^{y}	11	–	13	–	0	.458	39	–	22	–	0	.639
No. 23 Oregon ‍‍‍^{y}	10	–	14	–	0	.417	33	–	19	–	0	.635
Oregon State ‍‍‍^{y}	9	–	15	–	0	.375	39	–	22	–	0	.639
Utah ‍‍‍	9	–	15	–	0	.375	27	–	27	–	0	.500
Arizona ‍‍‍^{y}	8	–	16	–	0	.333	39	–	21	–	0	.650
California ‍‍‍	8	–	16	–	0	.333	28	–	27	–	1	.509
† – Conference champion y – Invited to the NCAA tournament As of June 6, 2022; Rankings from NFCA/USA Today

The 2022 Arizona State Sun Devils softball team represented Arizona State University in the 2022 NCAA Division I softball season. The Sun Devils were coached by Trisha Ford, in her sixth season. The Sun Devils played their home games at Alberta B. Farrington Softball Stadium and competed in the Pac-12 Conference.

== Personnel ==
=== Roster ===
2022 Arizona State Sun Devils roster
Pitchers: 8 – Marissa Schuld – Senior; 11 – Allison Royalty – Sophomore; 18 – Lindsay Lopez – Junior; 99 – Mac Morgan – Freshman; Catchers: 13 – Liliana Thomas – Freshman; 22 – Jessica Puk – Grad. Student	Infielders	Outfielders

=== Coaches ===
2022 Arizona State Sun Devils softball coaching staff
- – Head coach –
- – Assistant coach –
- – Assistant coach –
- – Volunteer assistant coach –

Note: Season counter accounts for all stints at Arizona State.

== Schedule ==
Legend
	Arizona State win
	Arizona State loss
	Cancelled/Postponed
*	Non-Conference
**Bold**	Arizona State Pitcher/Player
Rank	NFCA/USA Today

2022 Arizona State Sun Devils game log (13–1)
Regular Season: 13–1 (Home: 6–0; Away: 7–1; Neutral: 0–0)

February: 0–0
Game	Date Time	Opponent	Stadium	Score	Win	Loss	Save	Attendance	Overall Pac-12

March: 6–0
Game	Date	Rank	Opponent	Stadium	Score	Win	Loss	Save	Attendance	Overall	Pac-12
28	March 18	No. 22	Oregon State	Alberta B. Farrington Softball Stadium; Tempe, Arizona	5–3	**Morgan** **(10–1)**	Stepto (8–2)	—	1,643	20–5	1–0
29	March 19	No. 22	Oregon State	Alberta B. Farrington Softball Stadium; Tempe, Arizona	9–1 (6)	**Schuld** **(7–2)**	Haendiges (6–1)	—	1,501	21–5	2–0
30	March 20	No. 22	Oregon State	Alberta B. Farrington Softball Stadium; Tempe, Arizona	9–6 (8)	**Morgan** **(11–1)**	Stepto (8–3)	—	1,503	22–5	3–0
31	March 25	No. 20	at No. 14 Arizona	Rita Hillenbrand Memorial Stadium; Tucson, Arizona	9–2	**Morgan** **(12–1)**	Bowen (6–3)	**Schuld** **(2)**	2,977	23–5	4–0
32	March 26	No. 20	at No. 14 Arizona	Rita Hillenbrand Memorial Stadium; Tucson, Arizona	11–0 (5)	**Lopez** **(4–1)**	Netz (8–4)	—	2,925	24–5	5–0
33	March 27	No. 20	at No. 14 Arizona	Rita Hillenbrand Memorial Stadium; Tucson, Arizona	8–0 (5)	**Schuld** **(8–2)**	Bowen (6–4)	—	2,914	25–5	6–0

April: 7–1
Game	Date	Rank	Opponent	Stadium	Score	Win	Loss	Save	Attendance	Overall	Pac-12
34	April 8	No. 16	at No. 14 Oregon	Jane Sanders Stadium; Eugene, Oregon	9–3	**Morgan** **(13–1)**	Kliethermes (7–3)	—	1,946	26–5	7–0
35	April 9	No. 16	at No. 14 Oregon	Jane Sanders Stadium; Eugene, Oregon	9–4	**Royalty** **(2–1)**	Hansen (8–3)	**Schuld** **(3)**	1,944	27–5	8–0
36	April 10	No. 16	at No. 14 Oregon	Jane Sanders Stadium; Eugene, Oregon	8–6	**Schuld** **(9–2)**	Hansen (8–4)	—	1,672	28–5	9–0
37	April 14	No. 13	Utah	Alberta B. Farrington Softball Stadium; Tempe, Arizona	10–9 (8)	**Lopez** **(5–1)**	Smith (5–5)	—	1,333	29–5	10–0
38	April 15	No. 13	Utah	Alberta B. Farrington Softball Stadium; Tempe, Arizona	12–2 (5)	**Lopez** **(6–1)**	Sandez (8–7)	—	1,895	30–5	11–0
39	April 16	No. 13	Utah	Alberta B. Farrington Softball Stadium; Tempe, Arizona	8–7	**Morgan** **(14–1)**	Morris (2–4)	**Lopez** **(2)**	1,729	31–5	12–0
40	April 22	No. 13	at Stanford	Boyd & Jill Smith Family Stadium; Stanford, California	1–4	Valter (19–7)	**Morgan** **(14–2)**	—	598	31–6	12–1
41	April 23	No. 13	at Stanford	Boyd & Jill Smith Family Stadium; Stanford, California	3–1	**Lopez** **(7–1)**	Krause (8–4)	—	917	32–6	13–1
42	April 24	No. 13	at Stanford	Boyd & Jill Smith Family Stadium; Stanford, California						—	–
43	April 29		California	Alberta B. Farrington Softball Stadium; Tempe, Arizona						—	–
44	April 30		California	Alberta B. Farrington Softball Stadium; Tempe, Arizona						—	–

May: 0–0
Game	Date	Rank	Opponent	Stadium	Score	Win	Loss	Save	Attendance	Overall	Pac-12
45	May 1		California	Alberta B. Farrington Softball Stadium; Tempe, Arizona	—					—	–
46	May 6		UCLA	Alberta B. Farrington Softball Stadium; Tempe, Arizona	—					—	–
47	May 7		UCLA	Alberta B. Farrington Softball Stadium; Tempe, Arizona	—					—	–
48	May 8		UCLA	Alberta B. Farrington Softball Stadium; Tempe, Arizona	—					—	–
49	May 12		at Washington	Husky Softball Stadium; Seattle, Washington	—					—	–
50	May 13		at Washington	Husky Softball Stadium; Seattle, Washington	—					—	–
51	May 14		at Washington	Husky Softball Stadium; Seattle, Washington	—					—	–

== Rankings ==
Ranking movements Legend: ██ Increase in ranking ██ Decrease in ranking
	Week																
Poll	Pre	1	2	3	4	5	6	7	8	9	10	11	12	13	14	15	Final
NFCA / USA Today	21	23	22	23	23	22	20	16	16								
Softball America	21	23	25	25	25	24	20	13	13								
ESPN.com/USA Softball	21	21	22	23	23	22	20	15	13								
D1Softball	21	22	23	24	25	24	17	14	13								
