= 2022 NCAA Division I softball rankings =

2022 NCAA Division I softball season
- Preseason No. 1: Oklahoma (Unanimous)
- Defending Champions: Oklahoma
- TV partner/s: ESPN

NCAA Tournament
- Duration: May 20 – June 9, 2022
- Most conference bids: SEC, 12 teams

Women's College World Series
- Duration: June 2–9, 2022
- Champions: Oklahoma (6th title)
- Runners-up: Texas (6th WCWS Appearance)
- Winning Coach: Patty Gasso (6th title)
- WCWS MOP: Jocelyn Alo (Oklahoma)

Seasons
- ← 2021 2023 →

The following human polls make up the 2022 NCAA Division I women's softball rankings. The NFCA/USA Today Poll is voted on by a panel of 32 Division I softball coaches. The NFCA/USA Today poll, the Softball America poll, the ESPN.com/USA Softball Collegiate rankings, and D1Softball rank the top 25 teams nationally.

== Legend ==
	Increase in ranking
	Decrease in ranking
	Not ranked previous week
Italics	Number of first place votes
(#–#)	Win–loss record
т	Tied with team above or below also with this symbol

== NFCA/USA Today ==
	Preseason Feb 1	Week 1 Feb 15	Week 2 Feb 22	Week 3 Mar 1	Week 4 Mar 8	Week 5 Mar 15	Week 6 Mar 22	Week 7 Mar 29	Week 8 Apr 5	Week 9 Apr 12	Week 10 Apr 19	Week 11 Apr 26	Week 12 May 3	Week 13 May 10	Week 14 May 17	Final Jun 14	
1.	Oklahoma	Oklahoma (5–0) (32)	Oklahoma (10–0) (32)	Oklahoma (15–0) (32)	Oklahoma (15–0) (32)	Oklahoma (20–0) (32)	Oklahoma (25–0) (32)	Oklahoma (32) (29–0)	Oklahoma (32–0) (32)	Oklahoma (36–0) (32)	Oklahoma (38–1)	Oklahoma (42–1) (32)	Oklahoma (45–1) (32)	Oklahoma (48–1) (32)	Oklahoma (49–2) (31)	Oklahoma (59–3) (32)	1.
2.	Alabama	Alabama (4–0)	Alabama (9–0)	Alabama (15–0)	Alabama (20–0)	Florida State (23–1)	Florida State (27–2)	Florida State (30–2)	Florida State (35–2)	Virginia Tech (29–5)	Alabama (36–6)	Virginia Tech (36–6)	Virginia Tech (39–6)	Virginia Tech (40–6)	Florida State (52–5) (1)	Texas (47–22–1)	2.
3.	UCLA	UCLA (4–1)	Florida State (10–0)	Florida State (15–0)	Florida State (19–1)	Alabama (21–2)	UCLA (24–3)	UCLA (28–3)	UCLA (31–3)	Alabama (33–5)	Virginia Tech (32–6)	UCLA (36–5)	Florida State (45–5)	Florida State (49–5)	Virginia Tech (41–7)	UCLA (51–10)	3.
4.	Florida State	Florida (4–0)	Florida (10–0)	Florida (16–0)	Florida (21–1)	UCLA (22–3)	Alabama (24–4)	Alabama (28–4)	Virginia Tech (27–3)	Florida State (37–4)	UCLA (32–5)	Florida State (43–5)	UCLA (39–6)	Arkansas (41–9)	Arkansas (44–9)	Oklahoma State (48–14)	4.
5.	Oklahoma State	Florida State (4–0)	Washington (9–1)	UCLA (12–3)	UCLA (17–3)	Florida (22–2)	Virginia Tech (21–3)	Virginia Tech (25–3)	Alabama (30–5)	UCLA (32–5)	Florida State (39–5)	Alabama (39–8)	Arkansas (39–8)	Alabama (41–10)	UCLA (43–8)	Florida (49–19)	5.
6.	Florida	Washington (5–0)	UCLA (7–3)	Virginia Tech (11–2)	Virginia Tech (14–3)	Virginia Tech (18–3)	Florida (25–3)	Oklahoma State (24–6)	Oklahoma State (28–6)	Oklahoma State (31–7)	Oklahoma State (34–7)	Oklahoma State (38–7)	Alabama (39–9)	UCLA (40–8)	Oklahoma State (41–12)	Northwestern (45–13)	6.
7.	Washington	Oklahoma State (4–1)	Virginia Tech (8–2)	Washington (11–4)	Washington (15–5)	Washington (19–5)	Oklahoma State (21–6)	Florida (27–5)	Florida (30–6)	Arkansas (28–7)	Arkansas (32–8)	Arkansas (35–8)	Oklahoma State (38–9)	Oklahoma State (38–12)	Alabama (41–11)	Arizona (39–22)	7.
8.	Arkansas	Virginia Tech (5–0)	Arizona (7–2)	Oklahoma State (10–4)	Arizona (15–4)	Kentucky (19–2)	Kentucky (20–5)	Kentucky (22–7)	Kentucky (25–8)	Kentucky (27–9)	Florida (34–9)	Northwestern (34–7)	Northwestern (38–7)	Arizona State (37–8)	Arizona State (39–9)	Oregon State (39–22)	8.
9.	Arizona	Arizona (3–1)	Oregon (8–1)	Arizona (10–4)	Kentucky (16–2)	Arizona (19–4)	Washington (20–7)	Northwestern (22–4)	Northwestern (24–5)	Florida (30–9)	Kentucky (29–11)	Florida (35–12)	Washington (32–11)	Duke (40–7)	Duke (41–8)	Arkansas (48–11)	9.
10.	Texas	Arkansas (3–2)	Arkansas (7–3)	Kentucky (13–1)	Oklahoma State (12–5)	Oklahoma State (16–5)	Arkansas (19–5)	Arkansas (21–6)	Arkansas (24–7)	Northwestern (27–6)	Northwestern (30–6)	Washington (28–11)	Florida (38–13)	Washington (34–13)	Northwestern (40–10)	Virginia Tech (46–10)	10.
11.	Missouri	Texas (4–1)	Oklahoma State (6–4)	Arkansas (8–3)	Oregon (16–3)	Oregon (19–3)	Northwestern (19–4)	Washington (20–10)	Washington (22–11)	Washington (27–11)	Washington (25–11)	Kentucky (30–13)	Duke (36–7)	Northwestern (39–9)	Washington (35–15)	Arizona State (43–11)	11.
12.	Georgia	Oregon (5–0)	Kentucky (9–1)	Oregon (11–3)	Arkansas (14–4)	Arkansas (17–4)	Oregon (21–4)	Oregon (24–5)	Tennessee (25–10)	Duke (32–5)	Duke (34–5)	Duke (36–7)	Arizona State (35–7)	Florida (41–15)	Florida (43–16)	Duke (44–11)	12.
13.	Virginia Tech	Georgia (5–1)	Duke (8–2)	Duke (13–3)	Duke (16–3)	Duke (21–3)	Duke (23–4)	Tennessee (22–9)	Duke (28–5)	Arizona State (28–5)	Arizona State (31–5)	Tennessee (33–13)	Kentucky (33–15)	Tennessee (38–15)	Tennessee (39–16)	Florida State (54–7)	13.
14.	LSU	Duke (4–1)	Clemson (6–3)	Clemson (11–3)	Missouri (16–4)	Northwestern (15–4)	Arizona (19–6)	Duke (23–5)	Oregon (24–8)	Georgia (33–8)	Georgia (35–9)	Arizona State (32–7)	Tennessee (35–14)	Kentucky (35–16)	Clemson (39–15)	UCF (49–14)	14.
15.	Clemson	Clemson (3–1)	Georgia (9–2)	Missouri (12–4)	Georgia (19–2)	Tennessee (18–6)	Tennessee (20–8)	Georgia (29–5)	Georgia (31–6)	Tennessee (26–12)	Tennessee (29–12)	Georgia (37–11)	Auburn (39–11)	Clemson (37–14)	Kentucky (35–17)	Washington (38–17)	15.
16.	Michigan	Kentucky (4–1)	Missouri (8–3)	Georgia (14–2)	Northwestern (15–4)	Georgia (22–3)	Clemson (19–8)	Arizona State (25–5)	Arizona State (25–5)	Clemson (30–10)	Texas (31–12–1)	Auburn (36–10)	Georgia (39–13)	Texas (37–16–1)	Texas (38–17–1)	Clemson (42–17)	16.
17.	James Madison	Missouri (3–2)	Tennessee (6–3)	Northwestern (10–4)	Clemson (12–6)	Clemson (16–6)	Georgia (26–4)	Auburn (27–4)	Auburn (29–6)	Oregon (24–11)	Clemson (33–11)	Texas (32–15–1)	Texas (35–15–1)	Auburn (39–14)	Auburn (39–15)	Alabama (44–13)	17.
18.	Oregon	Tennessee (4–0)	Northwestern (7–2)	Tennessee (9–6)	Tennessee (15–6)	Missouri (16–6)	Auburn (25–2)	Clemson (21–10)	Clemson (25–10)	Texas (30–10–1)	Auburn (32–9)	Clemson (33–14)	Clemson (37–14)	Georgia (40–15)	UCF (46–12)	Stanford (39–22)	18.
19.	Kentucky	Michigan (3–2)	Michigan (5–4)	Michigan (8–5)	Michigan (13–6)	Auburn (24–1)	Michigan (17–6)	Arizona (19–10)	Texas (29–10–1)	Auburn (29–9)	Oregon (25–13)	LSU (30–17)	LSU (32–19)	Notre Dame (39–9)	Georgia (40–16)	Mississippi State (37–27)	19.
20.	Duke	Louisiana (5–0)	Louisiana (6–0)	Auburn (15–1)	Auburn (21–1)	LSU (19–7)	Arizona State (22–5)	LSU (22–11)	Arizona (20–12)	UCF (34–10)	UCF (37–10)	Notre Dame (35–9)	Notre Dame (36–9)	LSU (34–20)	Missouri (36–20)	Tennessee (41–18)	20.
21.	Arizona State	LSU (4–2)	Auburn (9–1)	Louisiana (10–2)	LSU (17–6)	Michigan (15–6)	Missouri (19–8)	Texas (26–9–1)	LSU (22–15)	LSU (24–16)	LSU (27–16)	UCF (39–11)	UCF (42–11)	UCF (44–12)	Notre Dame (39–10)	Kentucky (37–19)	21.
22.	Tennessee	James Madison (0–0)	Arizona State (7–3)	LSU (12–5)	Louisiana (12–4)	Arizona State (18–5)	LSU (20–10)	UCF (29–7)	Michigan (20–11)	Michigan (23–12)	Notre Dame (31–9)	Oregon (26–16)	Oregon (29–16)	Oregon (31–17)	LSU (34–21)	Georgia (41–18)	22.
23.	Louisiana	Arizona State (3–2)	Texas (5–6)	Arizona State (9–4)	Arizona State (13–5)	Louisiana (15–5)	UCF (26–7)	Michigan (18–9)	UCF (29–10)	Notre Dame (30–7)	Michigan (26–13)	Michigan (29–14)	Michigan (31–15)	Michigan (34–15)	Oregon (31–17)	Missouri (35–20)	23.
24.	Liberty	UCF (3–1)	LSU (6–5)	UCF (10–6)	Notre Dame (16–4)	UCF (22–7)	Texas (21–9–1)	Missouri (19–12)	Missouri (22–13)	Stanford (26–10)	Arizona (23–15)	Stanford (31–13)	Missouri (31–17)	Missouri (33–19)	Michigan (36–16)	Auburn (40–17)	24.
25.	Wichita State	Wichita State (4–1)	USF (6–2)	Notre Dame (12–3)	Charlotte (18–3)	South Florida (22–4)	Stanford (22–6)	Notre Dame (23–6)	Notre Dame (27–7)	Arizona (21–14)	Nebraska (33–9)	Arizona (27–16)	Arizona (31–16)	Louisiana (41–11)	Nebraska (40–14)	Oregon (33–19)	25.
	Preseason Feb 1	Week 1 Feb 15	Week 2 Feb 22	Week 3 Mar 1	Week 4 Mar 8	Week 5 Mar 15	Week 6 Mar 22	Week 7 Mar 29	Week 8 Apr 5	Week 9 Apr 12	Week 10 Apr 19	Week 11 Apr 26	Week 12 May 3	Week 13 May 10	Week 14 May 17	Final Jun 14	
		Dropped: No. 24 Liberty	Dropped: No. 22 James Madison; No. 24 UCF; No. 25 Wichita State	Dropped: No. 22 Texas; No. 25 USF	Dropped: No. 24 UCF	Dropped: No. 24 Notre Dame; No. 25 Charlotte	Dropped: No. 23 Louisiana; No. 25 South Florida	Dropped: No. 25 Stanford	Dropped: None	Dropped: No. 24 Missouri	Dropped: No. 24 Stanford	Dropped: No. 25 Nebraska	Dropped: No. 24 Stanford	Dropped: No. 25 Arizona	Dropped: No. 25 Louisiana	Dropped: No. 21 Notre Dame; No. 22 LSU; No. 24 Michigan; No. 25 Nebraska	

== ESPN.com/USA Softball Collegiate Top 25 ==
	Preseason Jan 25	Week 1 Feb 15	Week 2 Feb 22	Week 3 Mar 1	Week 4 Mar 8	Week 5 Mar 15	Week 6 Mar 22	Week 7 Mar 29	Week 8 Apr 5	Week 9 Apr 12	Week 10 Apr 19	Week 11 Apr 26	Week 12 May 3	Week 13 May 10	Week 14 May 17	Final Jun 14	
1.	Oklahoma	Oklahoma (5–0) (25)	Oklahoma (10–0) (24)	Oklahoma (15–0) (23)	Oklahoma (15–0) (22)	Oklahoma (20–0) (24)	Oklahoma (25–0) (24)	Oklahoma (29–0) (24)	Oklahoma (32–0) (23)	Oklahoma (36–0) (24)	Oklahoma (38–1) (25)	Oklahoma (42–1) (25)	Oklahoma (45–1) (25)	Oklahoma (48–1) (25)	Oklahoma (49–2) (25)	Oklahoma (59–3) (25)	1.
2.	Alabama	Alabama (4–0)	Alabama (9–0)	Alabama (15–0) (1)	Alabama (20–0) (2)	Florida State (23–1)	UCLA (24–3) (1)	UCLA (28–3) (1)	UCLA (31–3) (2)	Alabama (33–5)	Alabama (36–6)	Virginia Tech (36–6)	Virginia Tech (39–6)	Virginia Tech (40–6)	Florida State (52–5)	Texas (47–22–1)	2.
3.	UCLA	UCLA (4–1)	Florida State (10–0) (1)	Florida State (15–0) (1)	Florida State (19–1)	UCLA (22–3) (1)	Florida State (27–2)	Florida State (30–2)	Florida State (35–2)	Virginia Tech (29–5) (1)	Virginia Tech (32–6)	UCLA (36–5)	Florida State (45–5)	Florida State (49–5)	Virginia Tech (41–7)	UCLA (51–10)	3.
4.	Oklahoma State	Florida (4–0)	Florida (10–0)	Florida (16–0)	Florida (21–1)	Alabama (21–2)	Alabama (24–4)	Alabama (28–4)	Alabama (30–5)	Florida State (37–4)	UCLA (32–5)	Florida State (43–5)	UCLA (39–6)	Arizona State (37–8)	Arkansas (44–9)	Oklahoma State (48–14)	4.
5.	Florida	Washington (5–0)	Washington (9–1)	UCLA (12–3)	UCLA (17–3) (1)	Virginia Tech (18–3)	Virginia Tech (21–3)	Virginia Tech (25–3)	Virginia Tech (27–3)	UCLA (32–5)	Florida State (39–5)	Arkansas (35–8)	Arkansas (39–8)	Arkansas (41–9)	Arizona State (39–9)	Florida (49–19)	5.
6.	Florida State	Florida State (4–0)	UCLA (7–3)	Virginia Tech (11–2)	Virginia Tech (14–3)	Florida (22–2)	Florida (25–3)	Northwestern (22–4)	Florida (30–6)	Arkansas (28–7)	Arkansas (32–8)	Alabama (39–8)	Northwestern (38–7)	UCLA (40–8)	UCLA (43–8)	Northwestern (45–13)	6.
7.	Washington	Oklahoma State (4–1)	Virginia Tech (8–2)	Washington (11–4)	Washington (15–5)	Washington (19–5)	Duke (23–4)	Florida (27–5)	Oklahoma State (28–6)	Oklahoma State (31–7)	Oklahoma State (34–7)	Oklahoma State (38–7)	Oklahoma State (38–9)	Alabama (41–10)	Oklahoma State (41–12)	Arizona (39–22)	7.
8.	Texas	Virginia Tech (5–0)	Arkansas (7–3)	Missouri (12–4)	Missouri (16–4)	Duke (21–3)	Arkansas (19–5)	Oklahoma State (24–6)	Northwestern (24–5)	Northwestern (27–6)	Northwestern (30–6)	Northwestern (34–7)	Alabama (39–9)	Oklahoma State (38–12)	Alabama (41–11)	Arkansas (48–11)	8.
9.	Arkansas	Texas (4–1)	Clemson (6–3)	Clemson (11–3)	Duke (16–3)	Oklahoma State (16–5)	Northwestern (19–4)	Arkansas (21–6)	Arkansas (24–7)	Florida (30–9)	Florida (34–9)	Arizona State (32–7)	Arizona State (35–7)	Northwestern (39–9)	Northwestern (40–10)	Virginia Tech (46–10)	9.
10.	Virginia Tech	Arkansas (3–2)	Arizona (7–2)	Oklahoma State (10–4)	Oklahoma State (12–5)	Arkansas (17–4)	Oklahoma State (21–6)	Duke (23–5)	Duke (28–5)	Arizona State (28–5)т	Arizona State (31–5)	Florida (35–12)	Washington (32–11)	Tennessee (38–15)	Tennessee (39–16)	Oregon State (39–12)	10.
11.	Arizona	Arizona (3–1)	Oregon (8–1)	Arkansas (8–3)	Arkansas (14–4)	Kentucky (19–2)	Washington (20–7)	Tennessee (22–9)	Tennessee (25–10)	Duke (32–5)т	Duke (34–5)	Washington (28–11)	Florida (38–13)	Washington (34–13)	Washington (35–15)	Arizona State (43–11)	11.
12.	Missouri	Clemson (3–1)	Oklahoma State (6–4)	Duke (13–3)	Kentucky (16–2)	Northwestern (15–4)	Oregon (21–4)	Kentucky (22–7)	Kentucky (25–8)	Kentucky (27–9)	Kentucky (29–11)	Tennessee (33–13)	Tennessee (35–14)	Duke (40–7)	Duke (41–8)	Duke (44–11)	12.
13.	Michigan	Oregon (5–0)	Duke (8–2)	Kentucky (13–1)	Northwestern (15–4)	Oregon (19–3)	Kentucky (20–5)	Oregon (24–5)	Arizona State (25–5)	Georgia (33–8)	Georgia (35–9)	Duke (36–7)	Duke (36–7)	Florida (41–15)	Clemson (39–15)	Florida State (54–7)	13.
14.	Clemson	Duke (4–1)	Kentucky (9–1)	Northwestern (10–4)	Oregon (16–3)	Tennessee (18–3)	Tennessee (20–8)	Washington (20–10)	Oregon (24–8)	Tennessee (26–12)	Tennessee (29–12)	Kentucky (30–13)	Texas (35–15–1)	Kentucky (35–16)	Florida (43–16)	Clemson (42–17)	14.
15.	LSU	Tennessee (4–0)	Northwestern (7–2)	Oregon (11–3)	Clemson (12–6)	Clemson (16–6)	Clemson (19–8)	Arizona State (25–5)	Washington (22–11)	Washington (22–11)	Washington (25–11)	Georgia (37–11)	Kentucky (33–15)	Clemson (37–14)	Kentucky (35–17)	Stanford (39–22)т	15.
16.	Tennessee	Michigan (3–2)	Michigan (5–4)	Arizona (10–4)	Arizona (15–4)	Arizona (19–4)	Michigan (17–6)	Clemson (21–10)	Georgia (31–6)	Clemson (30–10)	Texas (31–12–1)	Texas (32–15–1)	Auburn (39–11)	Texas (37–16–1)	UCF (46–12)т	UCF (46–14)т	16.
17.	Oregon	Missouri (3–2)	Tennessee (6–3)	Tennessee (9–6)	Michigan (13–6)	Missouri (16–6)	Arizona (19–6)	Auburn (27–4)	Auburn (29–6)т	Oregon (24–11)	Clemson (33–11)	Clemson (33–14)	Clemson (37–14)	UCF (44–12)	Missouri (36–20)т	Alabama (44–13)	17.
18.	Duke	Georgia (5–1)	Georgia (9–2)	Georgia (14–2)	Tennessee (15–6)	LSU (19–7)	Auburn (25–2)	Georgia (29–5)	Clemson (25–10)т	Texas (30–10–1)	Auburn (32–9)	Auburn (36–10)	Georgia (39–13)	LSU (34–20)	Texas (38–17–1)	Washington (38–17)	18.
19.	Georgia	Kentucky (4–1)	Missouri (8–3)	Michigan (8–5)	Georgia (19–2)	Michigan (15–6)	Missouri (19–9)	Texas (26–9–1)	Texas (29–10–1)	Auburn (29–9)	UCF (37–10)	LSU (30–17)	UCF (42–11)	Georgia (40–15)	Georgia (40–16)	Tennessee (41–18)	19.
20.	Kentucky	Louisiana (5–0)	Louisiana (6–0)	Auburn (15–1)	Auburn (21–1)	Auburn (24–1)	Arizona State (22–5)	UCF (29–7)	UCF (29–10)	UCF (34–10)	Oregon (25–13)	UCF (39–11)	LSU (32–19)	Auburn (39–14)	LSU (34–21)	Mississippi State (37–27)	20.
21.	Arizona State	Arizona State (3–2)	Auburn (9–1)	LSU (12–5)т	LSU (17–6)	Georgia (22–3)	Georgia (26–4)	LSU (22–11)	Michigan (20–11)	Oregon State (31–9)	LSU (27–16)	Stanford (31–13)	Notre Dame (36–9)	Notre Dame (39–9)	Auburn (39–15)	Kentucky (37–19)	21.
22.	James Madison	LSU (4–2)	Arizona State (7–3)	Louisiana (10–2)т	South Florida (17–3)	Arizona State (18–5)	LSU (20–10)	Michigan (18–9)	Oregon State (29–8)	Michigan (23–12)	Michigan (26–13)	Michigan (29–14)	Michigan (31–15)	Missouri (33–19)	Michigan (36–16)	Missouri (38–22)	22.
23.	Louisiana	Northwestern (4–1)	LSU (6–5)	Arizona State (9–4)	Arizona State (13–5)	South Florida (22–4)	Texas (21–9–1)	Oregon State (25–8)	LSU (22–15)	LSU (24–16)	Oregon State (31–12)	Notre Dame (35–9)	Missouri (32–17)	Michigan (34–15)	Notre Dame (39–10)	Georgia (43–18)	23.
24.	Northwestern	UCF (3–1)	Texas (5–6)	South Florida (10–3)	Oregon State (17–3)	Oregon State (22–4)	UCF (26–7)	Arizona (19–9)	Arizona (20–12)	Stanford (26–10)	Nebraska (33–9)	Oregon (26–16)	Stanford (32–16)	Oregon (31–17)	Oregon (31–17)	Michigan (38–18)	24.
25.	Wichita State	Auburn (5–0)	South Florida (6–2)	UCF (10–6)	Louisiana (12–4)	UCF (22–7)	Stanford (20–6)	Missouri (19–12)	Missouri (22–13)	Notre Dame (30–7)	Notre Dame (31–9)	Missouri (27–17)	Oregon (29–16)	Arizona (32–18)	Nebraska (40–14)	Oregon (33–19)	25.
	Preseason Jan 25	Week 1 Feb 15	Week 2 Feb 22	Week 3 Mar 1	Week 4 Mar 8	Week 5 Mar 15	Week 6 Mar 22	Week 7 Mar 29	Week 8 Apr 5	Week 9 Apr 12	Week 10 Apr 19	Week 11 Apr 26	Week 12 May 3	Week 13 May 10	Week 14 May 17	Final Jun 14	
		Dropped: No. 22 James Madison; No. 25 Wichita State	Dropped: No. 24 UCF	Dropped: No. 24 Texas	Dropped: No. 25 UCF	Dropped: No. 25 Louisiana	Dropped: No. 23 South Florida; No. 24 Oregon State	Dropped: No. 25 Stanford	Dropped: None	Dropped: No. 24 Arizona; No. 25 Missouri	Dropped: No. 24 Stanford	Dropped: No. 23 Oregon State; No. 24 Nebraska	Dropped: None	Dropped: No. 24 Stanford	Dropped: No. 25 Arizona	Dropped: No. 20 LSU; No. 21 Auburn; No. 23 Notre Dame; No. 25 Nebraska	

== D1Softball ==
	Preseason Jan 17	Week 1 Feb 14	Week 2 Feb 21	Week 3 Feb 28	Week 4 Mar 7	Week 5 Mar 14	Week 6 Mar 20	Week 7 Mar 28	Week 8 Apr 3	Week 9 Apr 11	Week 10 Apr 18	Week 11 Apr 25	Week 12 May 2	Week 13 May 9	Final Jun 14	
1.	Oklahoma	Oklahoma (5–0)	Oklahoma (10–0)	Oklahoma (15–0)	Oklahoma (15–0)	Oklahoma (20–0)	Oklahoma (25–0)	Oklahoma (29–0)	Oklahoma (32–0)	Oklahoma (36–0)	Oklahoma (38–1)	Oklahoma (42–1)	Oklahoma (45–1)	Oklahoma (48–1)	Oklahoma (59–3)	1.
2.	Alabama	Alabama (4–0)	Alabama (9–0)	Alabama (15–0)	Alabama (20–0)	Florida State (23–1)	UCLA (24–3)	UCLA (28–3)	UCLA (31–3)	Alabama (33–5)	Alabama (36–6)	Virginia Tech (36–6)	Virginia Tech (39–6)	Virginia Tech (40–6)	UCLA (51–10)	2.
3.	Oklahoma State	Florida (4–0)	Florida (10–0)	Florida (15–0)	Florida (21–1)	UCLA (22–3)	Florida State (27–2)	Florida State (30–2)	Florida State (35–2)	Virginia Tech (29–5)	Virginia Tech (32–6)	Florida State (43–5)	Florida State (45–5)	Florida State (49–5)	Oklahoma State (48–14)	3.
4.	UCLA	UCLA (4–1)	Florida State (10–0)	Florida State (15–0)	Florida State (19–1)	Alabama (21–2)	Alabama (24–4)	Alabama (28–4)	Virginia Tech (27–3)	Florida State (37–4)	Florida State (39–5)	UCLA (36–5)	Arkansas (39–8)	Arkansas (41–9)	Texas (47–22–1)	4.
5.	Florida	Florida State (4–0)	Washington (9–1)	UCLA (12–3)	UCLA (17–3)	Florida (22–2)	Virginia Tech (21–3)	Virginia Tech (25–3)	Alabama (30–5)	UCLA (32–5)	UCLA (32–5)	Arkansas (35–8)	UCLA (39–6)	Arizona State (37–8)	Florida (49–19)	5.
6.	Florida State	Washington (5–0)	UCLA (7–3)	Virginia Tech (11–2)	Virginia Tech (14–3)	Virginia Tech (18–3)	Florida (25–3)	Northwestern (22–4)	Northwestern (24–5)	Arkansas (28–7)	Arkansas (32–8)	Oklahoma State (38–7)	Oklahoma State (38–9)	Alabama (41–10)	Northwestern (45–13)	6.
7.	Washington	Oklahoma State (4–1)	Virginia Tech (8–2)	Duke (13–3)	Duke (16–3)	Duke (21–3)	Duke (23–4)	Florida (27–5)	Oklahoma State (28–6)	Northwestern (27–6)	Northwestern (30–6)	Alabama (39–8)	Northwestern (38–7)	Duke (40–7)	Virginia Tech (46–10)	7.
8.	Arkansas	Virginia Tech (5–0)	Arkansas (7–3)	Arkansas (8–3)	Arkansas (14–4)	Arkansas (17–4)	Northwestern (19–4)	Duke (23–5)	Florida (30–6)	Oklahoma State (31–7)	Oklahoma State (34–7)	Northwestern (34–7)	Alabama (39–9)	UCLA (40–8)	Arkansas (48–11)	8.
9.	Texas	Arkansas (3–2)	Duke (8–2)	Oklahoma State (10–4)	Northwestern (15–4)	Northwestern (15–4)	Arkansas (19–5)	Oklahoma State (24–6)	Duke (28–5)	Duke (32–5)	Duke (34–5)	Washington (28–11)	Washington (32–11)	Oklahoma State (38–12)	Arizona (39–22)	9.
10.	Missouri	Texas (4–1)	Northwestern (7–2)	Washington (11–4)	Missouri (16–4)	Washington (19–5)	Oklahoma State (21–6)	Arkansas (21–6)	Arkansas (24–7)	Florida (30–9)	Florida (34–9)	Duke (36–7)	Duke (36–7)	Northwestern (39–9)	Oregon State (39–22)	10.
11.	Virginia Tech	Oregon (5–0)	Oklahoma State (6–4)	Northwestern (10–4)	Washington (15–5)	Oklahoma State (16–5)	Oregon (21–4)	Tennessee (22–9)	Kentucky (25–8)	Arizona State (28–5)	Arizona State (31–5)	Florida (35–12)	Arizona State (35–7)	Tennessee (38–15)	Arizona State (43–11)	11.
12.	Michigan	Duke (4–1)	Oregon (8–1)	Missouri (12–4)	Oklahoma State (12–5)	Oregon (19–3)	Kentucky (20–5)	Kentucky (22–7)	Tennessee (25–10)	Kentucky (27–9)	Washington (25–11)	Arizona State (32–7)	Florida (38–13)	Washington (34–13)	Florida State (54–7)	12.
13.	Duke	Clemson (3–1)	Clemson (6–3)	Clemson (10–3)	Oregon (16–3)	Kentucky (19–2)	Michigan (17–6)	Oregon (24–5)	Arizona State (25–5)	Georgia (33–8)	Kentucky (29–11)	Tennessee (33–13)	Tennessee (35–14)	Florida (41–15)	UCF (49–14)	13.
14.	Clemson	Missouri (3–2)	Missouri (8–3)	Kentucky (13–1)	Kentucky (16–2)	Tennessee (18–6)	Tennessee (20–8)	Arizona State (25–5)	Georgia (31–6)	Texas (30–10–1)	Texas (31–12–1)	Kentucky (30–13)	Texas (35–15–1)	Kentucky (35–16)	Duke (44–11)	14.
15.	Arizona	Tennessee (4–0)	Kentucky (9–1)	Oregon (11–3)	Michigan (13–6)	Michigan (15–6)	Washington (20–7)	Texas (26–9–1)	Texas (29–10–1)	Washington (22–11)	Georgia (35–9)	Texas (32–15–1)	Kentucky (33–15)	Texas (37–16–1)	Clemson (42–17)	15.
16.	Oregon	Arizona (3–1)	Arizona (7–2)	Michigan (8–5)	Tennessee (15–6)	Missouri (16–6)	Texas (21–9–1)	Washington (20–10)	Washington (22–11)	Tennessee (26–12)	Tennessee (29–12)	Georgia (37–11)	Clemson (37–14)	Clemson (37–14)	Stanford (39–22)	16.
17.	LSU	Michigan (3–2)	Michigan (5–4)	Tennessee (9–6)	Clemson (12–6)	Auburn (24–1)	Arizona State (22–5)	Auburn (27–4)	Oregon (24–8)	Clemson (30–10)	Clemson (33–11)	UCF (39–11)	Auburn (39–11)	UCF (44–12)	Mississippi State (37–27)	17.
18.	Tennessee	Kentucky (4–1)	Louisiana (6–0)	Arizona (10–4)	Georgia (19–2)	Clemson (16–6)	Auburn (25–2)	Georgia (29–5)	Auburn (29–6)	UCF (34–10)	UCF (37–10)	Clemson (33–14)	Georgia (39–13)	Notre Dame (39–9)	Alabama (44–13)	18.
19.	Georgia	Georgia (5–1)	Georgia (9–2)	Georgia (13–3)	Auburn (21–1)	LSU (19–7)	Clemson (19–8)	Clemson (21–10)	Clemson (25–10)	Oregon State (31–9)	Auburn (32–9)	Auburn (36–10)	UCF (42–11)	Auburn (39–14)	Kentucky (37–19)	19.
20.	Kentucky	Louisiana (5–0)	Tennessee (6–3)	Auburn (15–1)	Arizona (15–4)	Arizona (19–4)	Missouri (19–9)	UCF (29–7)	Oregon State (29–8)	Oregon (24–11)	Oregon State (31–12)	Notre Dame (35–9)	Notre Dame (36–9)	Michigan (34–15)	Tennessee (41–18)	20.
21.	Arizona State	Northwestern (4–1)	Auburn (9–1)	Louisiana (10–2)	LSU (17–6)	Georgia (22–3)	Georgia (26–4)	Michigan (18–9)	Ohio State (23–7)	Michigan (23–12)	Nebraska (33–9)	Oregon State (31–15)	Michigan (31–15)	Georgia (40–15)	Washington (38–17)	21.
22.	Louisiana	Arizona State (3–2)	South Florida (6–2)	LSU (12–5)	South Florida (17–3)	South Florida (22–4)	Arizona (19–6)	LSU (22–11)	Michigan (20–11)	Auburn (29–9)	Michigan (26–13)	Michigan (29–14)	San Diego State (33–12)	Louisiana (42–11)	Missouri (38–22)	22.
23.	Northwestern	LSU (4–2)	Arizona State (7–3)	South Florida (10–3)	Oregon State (17–3)	Oregon State (22–4)	UCF (26–7)	Oregon State (25–8)	UCF (29–10)	Notre Dame (30–7)	San Diego State (29–12)	Stanford (31–13)	Louisiana (39–11)	LSU (34–20)	Georgia (43–18)	23.
24.	Liberty	UCF (3–1)	BYU (8–1)	Arizona State (9–4)	Charlotte (18–3)	Arizona State (18–5)	Ohio State (17–5)	Ohio State (20–6)	Missouri (22–13)	San Diego State (27–11)	Notre Dame (31–9)	San Diego State (30–12)	Wichita State (31–13)	San Diego State (35–13)	Louisiana (47–13)	24.
25.	James Madison	Illinois (4–1)	LSU (6–5)	Oregon State (12–3)	Arizona State (13–5)	Texas (16–9–1)	LSU (20–10)	Boise State (27–5)	San Diego State (25–10)	Stanford (26–10)	Illinois (26–14)	LSU (30–17)	LSU (32–19)	Ole Miss (38–16)	San Diego State (39–16)	25.
	Preseason Jan 17	Week 1 Feb 14	Week 2 Feb 21	Week 3 Feb 28	Week 4 Mar 7	Week 5 Mar 14	Week 6 Mar 20	Week 7 Mar 28	Week 8 Apr 3	Week 9 Apr 11	Week 10 Apr 18	Week 11 Apr 25	Week 12 May 2	Week 13 May 9	Final Jun 14	
		Dropped: No. 24 Liberty; No. 25 James Madison	Dropped: No. 10 Texas; No. 24 UCF; No. 25 Illinois	Dropped: No. 24 BYU	Dropped: No. 21 Louisiana	Dropped: No. 24 Charlotte	Dropped: No. 22 South Florida; No. 23 Oregon State	Dropped: No. 20 Missouri; No. 22 Arizona	Dropped: No. 22 LSU; No. 25 Boise State	Dropped: No. 21 Ohio State; No. 24 Missouri	Dropped: No. 20 Oregon; No. 25 Stanford	Dropped: No. 21 Nebraska; No. 25 Illinois	Dropped: No. 21 Oregon State; No. 23 Stanford	Dropped: No. 24 Wichita State	Dropped: No. 18 Notre Dame; No. 19 Auburn; No. 20 Michigan; No. 23 LSU; No. 25 Ole Miss	

== Softball America ==
	Preseason Jan 25	Week 1 Feb 15	Week 2 Feb 22	Week 3 Mar 1	Week 4 Mar 8	Week 5 Mar 15	Week 6 Mar 22	Week 7 Mar 29	Week 8 Apr 5	Week 9 Apr 12	Week 10 Apr 19	Week 11 Apr 26	Week 12 May 3	Week 13 May 10	Week 14 May 17	Week 15 May 24	Final June 14	
1.	Oklahoma	Oklahoma (5–0)	Oklahoma (10–0)	Oklahoma (15–0)	Oklahoma (16–0)	Oklahoma (20–0)	Oklahoma (25–0)	Oklahoma (29–0)	Oklahoma (32–0)	Oklahoma (36–0)	Oklahoma (38–1)	Oklahoma (42–1)	Oklahoma (45–1)	Oklahoma (48–1)	Oklahoma (49–2)	Oklahoma (52–2)	Oklahoma (59–3)	1.
2.	Oklahoma State	Alabama (4–0)	Alabama (9–0)	Alabama (15–0)	Alabama (20–0)	Florida State (23–1)	Florida State (27–2)	Florida State (30–2)	Florida State (35–2)	Alabama (33–6)	Alabama (36–6)	Virginia Tech (36–6)	Virginia Tech (39–6)	Virginia Tech (40–6)	Florida State (52–5)	Virginia Tech (45–8)	Texas (47–22–1)	2.
3.	Alabama	UCLA (4–1)	Florida State (10–0)	Florida State (15–0)	Florida State (19–1)	UCLA (22–3)	UCLA (25–3)	UCLA (28–3)	UCLA (31–3)	Virginia Tech (29–5)	Virginia Tech (32–6)	Florida State (43–5)	Florida State (45–5)	Florida State (49–5)	Virginia Tech (41–7)	Arkansas (47–9)	Oklahoma State (48–14)	3.
4.	UCLA	Oklahoma State (4–1)	Florida (10–0)	Florida (16–0)	Florida (21–1)	Florida (23–2)	Florida (25–3)	Alabama (28–4)	Alabama (31–5)	Florida State (37–4)	Florida State (39–5)	UCLA (36–5)	Arkansas (39–8)	Arkansas (41–9)	Arkansas (44–9)	UCLA (46–8)	UCLA (51–10)	4.
5.	Florida State	Florida State (4–0)	Washington (9–1)	UCLA (12–3)	UCLA (17–3)	Alabama (21–2)	Alabama (24–4)	Virginia Tech (25–3)	Virginia Tech (27–4)	UCLA (32–5)	UCLA (32–5)	Arkansas (35–8)	UCLA (39–6)	Arizona State (37–8)	UCLA (43–8)	Oklahoma State (44–12)	Florida (49–19)	5.
6.	Florida	Florida (4–0)	UCLA (7–3)	Virginia Tech (11–2)	Virginia Tech (14–3)	Virginia Tech (18–3)	Virginia Tech (21–3)	Northwestern (22–4)	Oklahoma State (28–6)	Arkansas (28–7)	Arkansas (32–8)	Oklahoma State (38–7)	Oklahoma State (38–9)	Alabama (41–10)	Alabama (41–11)	Arizona State (42–9)	Arizona (39–22)	6.
7.	Arizona	Washington (5–0)	Virginia Tech (8–2)	Washington (11–4)	Northwestern (15–4)	Northwestern (15–4)	Northwestern (19–4)	Florida (27–5)	Northwestern (24–5)	Northwestern (27–6)	Northwestern (30–6)	Alabama (39–8)	Northwestern (38–7)	UCLA (40–8)	Oklahoma State (41–12)	Northwestern (43–10)	Northwestern (45–13)	7.
8.	Washington	Virginia Tech (5–0)	Oklahoma State (6–4)	Oklahoma State (10–4)	Duke (16–3)	Duke (21–3)	Duke (23–4)	Duke (23–5)	Florida (30–6)	Oklahoma State (31–7)	Oklahoma State (34–7)	Northwestern (34–7)	Alabama (39–9)	Duke (40–7)	Arizona State (39–9)	Clemson (42–15)	Oregon State (39–22)	8.
9.	Missouri	Duke (4–1)	Northwestern (7–2)	Duke (13–3)	Oregon (16–3)	Oregon (19–3)	Arkansas (20–5)	Oklahoma State (24–6)	Duke (28–5)	Duke (32–5)	Duke (34–5)	Washington (28–11)	Washington (33–11)	Oklahoma State (38–12)	Northwestern (40–10)	Duke (44–9)	Virginia Tech (46–10)	9.
10.	Arkansas	Arizona (3–1)	Duke (8–2)	Northwestern (10–4)	Washington (15–5)	Washington (19–5)	Oregon (22–4)	Arkansas (22–6)	Arkansas (24–7)	Arizona State (28–5)	Arizona State (31–5)	Duke (36–7)	Duke (36–7)	Northwestern (39–9)	Clemson (39–15)	Florida (46–16)	Arkansas (48–11)	10.
11.	Texas	Texas (4–1)	Oregon (8–1)	Clemson (11–3)	Missouri (16–4)	Arkansas (17–4)	Washington (20–7)	Oregon (24–5)	Kentucky (25–8)	Florida (31–9)	Florida (34–9)	Arizona State (32–7)	Arizona State (35–7)	Tennessee (38–15)	Tennessee (39–16)	UCF (49–12)	Arizona State (43–11)	11.
12.	Virginia Tech	Oregon (5–0)	Clemson (6–3)	Missouri (12–4)	Arkansas (14–4)	Oklahoma State (16–5)	Oklahoma State (21–6)	Tennessee (22–9)	Tennessee (25–10)	Kentucky (27–9)	Texas (31–12–1)	Florida (35–12)	Texas (35–15–1)	Washington (34–13)	Duke (41–8)	Texas (41–18–1)	Clemson (42–17)	12.
13.	Michigan	Arkansas (3–2)	Arizona (7–2)	Oregon (11–3)	Oklahoma State (12–5)	Arizona (19–4)	Kentucky (20–5)	Arizona State (22–5)	Arizona State (25–5)	Texas (30–10–1)	Kentucky (29–11)	Tennessee (33–13)	Tennessee (35–15)	Florida (41–15)	Washington (35–15)	Mississippi State (37–25)	Duke (44–11)	13.
14.	Clemson	Clemson (3–1)	Arkansas (7–3)	Arkansas (9–4)	Arizona (15–4)	Kentucky (19–2)	Tennessee (20–8)	Texas (26–9–1)	Texas (29–10–1)	Clemson (30–10)	Clemson (33–11)	Kentucky (30–14)	Florida (38–13)	Texas (37–16–1)	Florida (43–16)	Stanford (39–20)	UCF (49–14)	14.
15.	Duke	Louisiana (5–0)	Louisiana (6–0)	Kentucky (13–1)	Kentucky (16–2)	Tennessee (18–6)	Arizona (19–7)	Kentucky (22–7)	Oregon (24–8)	Georgia (33–8)	Washington (25–11)	Texas (32–15–1)	UCF (42–11)	Kentucky (35–16)	Missouri (35–15)	Oregon State (37–20)	Mississippi State (37–27)	15.
16.	LSU	Georgia (5–1)	Kentucky (9–1)	Arizona (10–4)	Michigan (13–6)	LSU (19–7)	Texas (21–9–1)	Washington (20–10)	Washington (22–11)	Washington (22–11)	Georgia (35–9)	Georgia (37–11)	Kentucky (33–15)	Clemson (37–14)	UCF (46–12)	Arizona (36–20)	Stanford (39–22)	16.
17.	Oregon	Missouri (3–2)	Michigan (5–4)	Michigan (9–5)	Clemson (12–6)	Missouri (16–6)	Michigan (17–6)	Auburn (27–4)	Georgia (31–7)	Tennessee (26–12)	Tennessee (30–12)	UCF (39–11)	Clemson (37–14)	UCF (44–12)	Texas (38–17–1)	Florida State (54–7)	Florida State (54–7)	17.
18.	Georgia	Michigan (3–2)	Missouri (8–3)	Tennessee (9–6)	Tennessee (15–6)	Michigan (15–6)	Auburn (26–2)	UCF (29–7)	Auburn (29–6)	UCF (34–10)	UCF (37–10)	Clemson (33–14)	Georgia (39–13)	Notre Dame (39–9)	Kentucky (35–17)	Alabama (44–13)	Alabama (44–13)	18.
19.	Louisiana	LSU (4–2)	Tennessee (6–3)	Georgia (14–2)	Georgia (19–2)	Clemson (17–6)	Missouri (16–6)	Georgia (29–5)	Clemson (25–10)	Oregon State (31–9)	Auburn (32–9)	Auburn (36–10)	Auburn (39–11)	Auburn (39–14)	Notre Dame (39–10)	Tennessee (41–18)	Tennessee (41–18)	19.
20.	Kentucky	Kentucky (4–1)	Georgia (9–2)	Louisiana (10–2)	Auburn (21–1)	Auburn (24–1)	Arizona State (22–5)	LSU (22–12)	UCF (30–10)	Oregon (24–11)	Notre Dame (31–9)	Notre Dame (35–9)	Notre Dame (36–9)	Georgia (40–15)	Nebraska (40–14)	Washington (38–17)	Washington (38–17)	20.
21.	Arizona State	Tennessee (4–0)	LSU (6–5)	LSU (12–5)	USF (17–3)	Georgia (22–3)	Clemson (19–8)	Clemson (21–10)	Ohio State (23–7)	Notre Dame (30–7)	Oregon State (31–12)	Oregon State (31–15)	San Diego State (33–12)	Michigan (34–15)	Michigan (36–16)	Missouri (38–22)	Missouri (38–22)	21.
22.	James Madison	James Madison (0–0)	Auburn (9–1)	Auburn (15–1)	LSU (17–6)	South Florida (22–4)	Georgia (26–4)	Missouri (19–12)	Missouri (22–13)	Auburn (29–9)	Nebraska (33–9)	Michigan (29–14)	Louisiana (38–11)	Louisiana (41–11)	Auburn (39–15)	Kentucky (37–19)	Kentucky (37–19)	22.
23.	Tennessee	Arizona State (3–2)	USF (6–2)	Notre Dame (12–3)	Oregon State (19–3)	Oregon State (22–4)	LSU (20–10)	Michigan (18–9)	Michigan (20–11)	Michigan (23–12)	Oregon (25–13)	Stanford (31–13)	LSU (32–19)	LSU (34–20)	Louisiana (45–11)	Michigan (38–18)	Michigan (38–18)	23.
24.	Liberty	Illinois (4–1)	Notre Dame (7–3)	USF (10–3)	Charlotte (18–3)	Arizona State (18–5)	UCF (26–7)	Notre Dame (23–6)	Notre Dame (27–7)	Stanford (26–10)	Michigan (26–13)	LSU (30–17)	Michigan (31–15)	Ole Miss (38–16)	Georgia (40–16)	Louisiana (47–13)	Louisiana (47–13)	24.
25.	Wichita State	UCF (3–1)	Arizona State (7–3)	Arizona State (9–4)	Arizona State (13–5)	Texas (16–9–1)	Ohio State (17–5)	Ohio State (20–6)	LSU (22–15)	LSU (24–16)	LSU (27–16)	San Diego State (30–12)	Wichita State (31–13)	San Diego State (35–13)	Ole Miss (39–17)	Georgia (43–18)	Georgia (43–18)	25.
	Preseason Jan 25	Week 1 Feb 15	Week 2 Feb 22	Week 3 Mar 1	Week 4 Mar 8	Week 5 Mar 15	Week 6 Mar 22	Week 7 Mar 29	Week 8 Apr 5	Week 9 Apr 12	Week 10 Apr 19	Week 11 Apr 26	Week 12 May 3	Week 13 May 10	Week 14 May 17	Week 15 May 24	Final June 14	
		Dropped: No. 24 Liberty; No. 25 Wichita State	Dropped: No. 11 Texas; No. 22 James Madison; No. 24 Illinois; No. 25 UCF	Dropped: None	Dropped: No. 20 Louisiana; No. 23 Notre Dame	Dropped: No. 24 Charlotte	Dropped: No. 22 South Florida; No. 23 Oregon State	Dropped: No. 15 Arizona	Dropped: None	Dropped: No. 21 Ohio State; No. 22 Missouri	Dropped: No. 24 Stanford	Dropped: No. 22 Nebraska; No. 23 Oregon	Dropped: No. 21 Oregon State; No. 23 Stanford	Dropped: No. 25 Wichita State	Dropped: No. 23 LSU; No. 25 San Diego State	Dropped: No. 19 Notre Dame; No. 20 Nebraska; No. 22 Auburn; No. 25 Ole Miss	Dropped: none	
