= 2022 Big 12 Conference softball tournament =

- Teams: 7
- Format: Single-elimination tournament
- Finals site: USA Softball Hall of Fame Stadium; Oklahoma City, Oklahoma
- Champions: Oklahoma State (1st title)
- Runner-up: Oklahoma (12th title game)
- Winning coach: Kenny Gajewski (1st title)
- MVP: Morgan Day (Oklahoma State)

2022 Big 12 Conference softball standings
	Conf.						Overall
Team	W		L		T	PCT	W		L		T	PCT
No. 1 Oklahoma ‍†‍‍^{y}	17	–	1	–	0	.944	59	–	3	–	0	.952
No. 7 Oklahoma State ‍‍‡‍^{y}	14	–	4	–	0	.778	48	–	14	–	0	.774
No. 17 Texas ‍‍‍^{y}	12	–	6	–	0	.667	47	–	22	–	1	.679
Iowa State ‍‍‍	6	–	12	–	0	.333	28	–	27	–	0	.509
Baylor ‍‍‍	6	–	12	–	0	.333	32	–	24	–	0	.571
Texas Tech ‍‍‍	5	–	13	–	0	.278	22	–	27	–	0	.449
Kansas ‍‍‍	3	–	15	–	0	.167	20	–	36	–	0	.357
† – Conference champion ‡ – Tournament champion y – Invited to the NCAA tournament As of June 9, 2022; Rankings from NFCA/USA Today

The 2022 Big 12 Conference softball tournament was held at USA Softball Hall of Fame Stadium in Oklahoma City, Oklahoma from May 12 through May 14, 2022. As the tournament winner, Oklahoma State earned the Big 12 Conference's automatic bid to the 2022 NCAA Division I softball tournament.

== Format ==
All seven teams will be seeded based on conference winning percentage. They then will play a single-elimination tournament, with the top seed receiving a bye.

== Bracket ==
First Round; Thursday, May 12
4	Iowa State	2^{(8)}
5	Baylor	1
2	Oklahoma State	2
7	Kansas	0
3	Texas	9
6	Texas Tech	1

Semi-finals; Friday, May 13
1	Oklahoma	5
4	Iowa State	0
2	Oklahoma State	6
3	Texas	1

Championship; Saturday, May 14
1	Oklahoma	3
2	Oklahoma State	4^{(8)}

== Schedule ==
Game	Time*	Matchup^{No.}	Score	Television
First Round – Thursday, May 12
1	12:00 p.m.	No. 4 Iowa State vs. No. 5 Baylor	2–1^{(8)}	ESPNU
2	3:00 p.m.	No. 2 Oklahoma State vs. No. 7 Kansas	2–0	Big 12 Now
3	6:00 p.m.	No. 3 Texas vs. No. 6 Texas Tech	9–1	Big 12 Now
Semifinals – Friday, May 13
4	1:00 p.m.	No. 1 Oklahoma vs. No. 5 Iowa State	5–0	ESPNU
5	4:00 p.m.	No. 2 Oklahoma State vs. No. 3 Texas	6–1	Big 12 Now
Championship – Saturday, May 14
6	2:00 p.m.	No. 2 Oklahoma State vs. No. 1 Oklahoma	4–3^{(8)}	ESPN2
*Game times in CST. No. – Rankings denote tournament seed.

== All-Tournament Team ==
The following players were named to the all-tournament team:

Player	School
Jocelyn Alo	Oklahoma
Rylie Boone	Oklahoma
Lynnsie Elam	Oklahoma
Grace Lyons	Oklahoma
Hope Trautwein	Oklahoma
Chelsea Alexander	Oklahoma State
Morgan Day (MOP)	Oklahoma State
Chyenne Factor	Oklahoma State
Kelly Maxwell	Oklahoma State
Janae Jefferson	Texas
Mia Scott	Texas
