= 2022 Texas Longhorns softball team =

2022 Texas Longhorns softball

Seattle Regional Champion Fayetteville Super Regional Champion

Women’s College World Series, runner-up
- Conference: Big 12 Conference

Ranking
- Coaches: No. 2
- Record: 47–22–1 (12–6 Big 12)
- Head coach: Mike White (4th season)
- Assistant coaches: Steve Singleton (3rd season); Megan Bartlett (2nd season); Nicole Parnell (1st season)
- Home stadium: Red and Charline McCombs Field

2022 Big 12 Conference softball standings
	Conf.						Overall
Team	W		L		T	PCT	W		L		T	PCT
No. 1 Oklahoma ‍†‍‍^{y}	17	–	1	–	0	.944	59	–	3	–	0	.952
No. 7 Oklahoma State ‍‍‡‍^{y}	14	–	4	–	0	.778	48	–	14	–	0	.774
No. 17 Texas ‍‍‍^{y}	12	–	6	–	0	.667	47	–	22	–	1	.679
Iowa State ‍‍‍	6	–	12	–	0	.333	28	–	27	–	0	.509
Baylor ‍‍‍	6	–	12	–	0	.333	32	–	24	–	0	.571
Texas Tech ‍‍‍	5	–	13	–	0	.278	22	–	27	–	0	.449
Kansas ‍‍‍	3	–	15	–	0	.167	20	–	36	–	0	.357
† – Conference champion ‡ – Tournament champion y – Invited to the NCAA tournament As of June 9, 2022; Rankings from NFCA/USA Today

The 2022 Texas Longhorns softball team represented the University of Texas at Austin during the 2022 NCAA Division I softball season. The Longhorns played their home games at Red and Charline McCombs Field as a member of the Big 12 Conference. They were led by head coach Mike White, in his fourth season at Texas.

== Personnel ==
=== Roster ===
2022 Texas Longhorns Roster
Pitchers: 22 – Estelle Czech – sophomore; 27 – Hailey Dolcini – senior; 29 – Shealyn O’Leary – junior; 45 – Logan Hulon – junior; 99 – Sophia Simpson – freshman	Catchers: 18 – JJ Smith – sophomore; 33 – Mary Iakopo – senior; 44 – Katie Cimusz – freshman; Infielders/Utility Players: 00 – Lauren Burke – senior; 2 – Janae Jefferson – senior; 3 – Vanessa Quiroga – freshman; 4 – Brianna Cantu – sophomore; 9 – McKenzie Parker – junior; 10 – Mia Scott – freshman; 11 – Alyssa Washington – sophomore; 15 – Courtney Day – sophomore; 18 – JJ Smith – sophomore; 20 – Carlee Ratcliff – sophomore; 28 – Camille Corona – sophomore	Outfielders: 1 – Mya Holmes – freshman; 5 – Jordyn Whitaker – sophomore; 6 – Bella Dayton – sophomore; 7 – Ashton Maloney – freshman; 12 – Lou Gilbert – junior; 16 – Alyssa Popelka – sophomore

=== Coaches ===
2022 Texas Longhorns coaching staff
- Mike White – Head coach – 4th year
- Steve Singleton – Assistant coach – 3rd year
- Megan Bartlett – Assistant coach – 2nd year
- Nicole Parnell – Volunteer assistant coach – 1st year

=== Support staff ===
2022 Texas Longhorns support staff
- Keely McMillon – Director of operations – 2nd year
- Kassi Hardee – Associate athletic trainer (Softball) – 5th year
- Nick Williams – Video coordinator

== Offseason ==
=== Player departures ===
2022 Texas offseason departures
Name	Number	Pos.	Height	Year	Hometown	Notes
Molly Jacobsen	7	P	5’8”	Senior	Adel, IA	Graduated
Shannon Rhodes	13	OF	5’6”	Senior	Fort Worth, TX	Graduated
Taylor Ellsworth	17	C	5’5”	Senior	Georgetown, TX	Transferred to Arkansas
Ryleigh White	14	P	6’1”	Freshman	Washington Township, NJ	Transferred to Tennessee
Colleen Sullivan	19	C	5’6”	Sophomore	Poway, CA	Departed from Team
Ariana Adams	21	P	5’7”	Junior	Magnolia, TX	Transferred to Syracuse
MK Tedder	22	IF/OF	5’8”	Junior	Hoover, AL	Transferred to Samford

=== Coaching staff departures ===
Name	Position	New Team	New Position
Courtney Gettins	Volunteer Assistant Coach	Mercer	Assistant coach

=== Incoming players ===
2022 Texas Recruits
Name	Number	B/T	Pos.	Hometown	High School
Katie Cimusz	44	R/R	C/UTL	Humble, TX	Atascocita
Mya Holmes	1	R/R	OF	Texas City, TX	Texas City
Ashton Maloney	7	L/R	OF	Liberty, MO	Liberty
Vanessa Quiroga	3	L/R	UTL	Corpus Christi, TX	Mary Carroll
Mia Scott	10	L/R	IF	Angleton, TX	Angleton
Sophia Simpson	99	R/R	P	Mont Belvieu, TX	Barbers Hill

Incoming transfers

Name	B/T	Pos.	Height	Hometown	Year	Previous school
Estelle Czech	L/L	P	5’8”	Downers Grove, IL	Sophomore	NC State
Logan Hulon	R/R	P	5’6”	Dripping Springs, TX	Junior	Houston
Hailey Dolcini	R/R	P	6’0”	Ferndale, CA	Senior	Fresno State
Bella Dayton	L/L	OF	5’6”	Wylie, TX	Sophomore	Arizona
Lou Gilbert	L/R	OF	5’7”	Kansas City, MO	Junior	Baylor

== Preseason ==
=== Award watch lists ===
Listed in the order that they were released

Award	Player	Position	Year
USA Softball Collegiate Player of the Year	Janae Jefferson	IF	Senior
USA Softball Collegiate Player of the Year	Hailey Dolcini	P	Senior

=== Big 12 media poll ===
Big 12 media poll
Predicted finish	Team	Votes (1st place)
1	Oklahoma	36 (6)
2	Oklahoma State	31 (1)
3	Texas	26
4	Baylor	19
5	Iowa State	18
6	Texas Tech	10
7	Kansas	7

=== Preseason All-Big 12 team ===
Preseason All-Big 12 Team
Name	Number	Position	Class
Janae Jefferson^	2	IF	Senior
Shea O’Leary	29	P	Junior
Mary Iakopo	33	C	Senior

^Janae Jefferson was a unanimous selection.

=== Preseason All-Americans ===
First Team All-Americans
Player	No.	Position	Class	Selector(s)
Janae Jefferson	2	IF	Senior	D1Softball; Softball America

Second Team All-Americans
Player	No.	Position	Class	Selector(s)
Shea O’Leary	29	P	Junior	Softball America

Third Team All-Americans
Player	No.	Position	Class	Selector(s)
Hailey Dolcini	27	P	Senior	Softball America

== Schedule and results ==
2022 Texas Longhorns softball game log (47–22–1)
Legend: = Win = Loss

= Tie = Canceled Bold = Texas team member

Regular season (37–16–1)

February (9–7)
Date	Time (CT)	TV	Opponent	Rank	Stadium	Score	Win	Loss	Save	Attendance	Overall record	Big 12 Record	Box Score	Recap
FGCU Invitational
February 11	4:00 p.m.	YouTube	vs. Clemson*	No. 10	FGCU Softball Complex • Fort Myers, FL	4–0	**Dolcini** (1–0)	Valerie (1–1)	—	200	1–0	—	Box Score	Recap
February 11	6:30 p.m.	YouTube	at Florida Gulf Coast*	No. 10	FGCU Softball Complex • Fort Myers, FL	4–6	Estroff (1–0)	**O’Leary** (0–1)	Oakes (1)	553	1–1	—	Box Score	Recap
February 12	4:00 p.m.	YouTube	vs. Boston College*	No. 10	FGCU Softball Complex • Fort Myers, FL	7–0	**Hulon** (1–0)	Anderson (0–1)	—	250	2–1	—	Box Score	Recap
February 12	6:30 p.m.	YouTube	at Florida Gulf Coast*	No. 10	FGCU Softball Complex • Fort Myers, FL	10–2^{(6)}	**Dolcini** (2–0)	Hulme (0–1)	—	427	3–1	—	Box Score	Recap
February 13	10:45 a.m.	YouTube	vs. Boston College*	No. 10	FGCU Softball Complex • Fort Myers, FL	5–0	**Czech** (1–0)	Dunning (1–1)	—	200	4–1	—	Box Score	Recap
February 16	4:00 p.m.	LHN	vs. McNeese State*	No. 11	Red and Charline McCombs Field • Austin, TX	8–4	**Simpson** (1–0)	Vallejo (2–1)	—	894	5–1	—	Box Score	Recap
St. Pete/Clearwater Elite Invitational
February 18	12:00 p.m.	ESPNU	vs. No. 5 Florida State*	No. 11	Eddie C. Moore Complex • Clearwater, FL	2–9	Sandercock (3–0)	**O’Leary** (0–2)	—	N/A	5–2	—	Box Score	Recap
February 18	3:00 p.m.	LHN	vs. Auburn*	No. 11	Eddie C. Moore Complex • Clearwater, FL	2–6	Penta (3–0)	**Dolcini** (2–1)	—	N/A	5–3	—	Box Score	Recap
February 19	3:00 p.m.	ESPNU	vs. No. 3 UCLA*	No. 11	Eddie C. Moore Complex • Clearwater, FL	1–2	Faraimo (3–1)	**Simpson** (1–1)	—	N/A	5–4	—	Box Score	Recap
February 19	6:00 p.m.	LHN	vs. No. 24 UCF*	No. 11	Eddie C. Moore Complex • Clearwater, FL	10–15	DeVoe (1–0)	**O’Leary** (0–3)	—	4,853	5–5	—	Box Score	Recap
February 20	10:00 a.m.	ESPN+	vs. Notre Dame*	No. 11	Eddie C. Moore Complex • Clearwater, FL	2–9	Becker (3–1)	**Czech** (1–1)	Tidd (1)	N/A	5–6	—	Box Score	Recap
February 23	6:00 p.m.	LHN	vs. North Texas*	No. 23	Red and Charline McCombs Field • Austin, TX	Canceled due to inclement weather.								
Texas Classic
February 25	2:00 p.m.	LHN	vs. No. 22 Arizona State*	No. 23	Red and Charline McCombs Field • Austin, TX	0–2	Morgan (4–1)	**Dolcini** (2–2)	Lopez (1)	N/A	5–7	—	Box Score	Recap
February 27	5:00 p.m.	LHN	vs. UTSA*	No. 23	Red and Charline McCombs Field • Austin, TX	8–0^{(6)}	**Simpson** (2–1)	Williams (0–2)	—	N/A	6–7	—	Box Score; No-Hitter	Recap
February 27	7:30 p.m.	LHN	vs. Tulsa*	No. 23	Red and Charline McCombs Field • Austin, TX	14–1^{(5)}	**Czech** (2–1)	Brown (0–2)	—	N/A	7–7	—	Box Score	Recap
February 28	1:30 p.m.	LHN	vs. Tulsa*	No. 23	Red and Charline McCombs Field • Austin, TX	5–1	**Dolcini** (3–2)	Llamas-Howell (1–2)	—	801	8–7	—	Box Score	Recap
February 28	4:00 p.m.	LHN	vs. Texas State*	No. 23	Red and Charline McCombs Field • Austin, TX	5–2	**Simpson** (3–1)	Mullins (3–3)	—	835	9–7	—	Box Score	Recap

March (17–3–1)
Date	Time (CT)	TV	Opponent	Rank	Stadium	Score	Win	Loss	Save	Attendance	Overall record	Big 12 Record	Box Score	Recap
March 2	6:00 p.m.	LHN	vs. Sam Houston State*	—	Red and Charline McCombs Field • Austin, TX	2–0	**Dolcini** (4–2)	Billmeier (1–2)	—	885	10–7	—	Box Score	Recap
Easton Crimson Classic
March 4	6:00 p.m.	SECN+	at No. 2 Alabama*	—	Rhoads Stadium • Tuscaloosa, AL	4–5	Fouts (7–0)	**Simpson** (3–2)	—	3,940	10–8	—	Box Score	Recap
March 5	12:00 p.m.	N/A	vs. Miami*	—	Rhoads Stadium • Tuscaloosa, AL	14–3^{(5)}	**Czech** (3–1)	Pratt (3–3)	—	381	11–8	—	Box Score	Recap
March 5	2:30 p.m.	SECN+	at No. 2 Alabama*	—	Rhoads Stadium • Tuscaloosa, AL	1–3	Fouts (8–0)	**Dolcini** (4–3)	—	3,940	11–9	—	Box Score	Recap
March 6	10:00 a.m.	N/A	vs. Miami*	—	Rhoads Stadium • Tuscaloosa, AL	7–6	**O’Leary** (1–3)	Vierstra (0–6)	—	432	12–9	—	Box Score	Recap
March 9	6:00 p.m.	N/A	at North Texas*	—	Lovelace Stadium • Denton, TX	8–2	**Czech** (4–1)	Peters (6–2)	—	400	13–9	—	Box Score	Recap
Bevo Classic
March 11	4:00 p.m.	LHN	vs. Drake*	—	Red and Charline McCombs Field • Austin, TX	Canceled due to inclement weather.								
March 11	6:30 p.m.	LHN	vs. Minnesota*	—	Red and Charline McCombs Field • Austin, TX	Canceled due to inclement weather.								
March 12	3:00 p.m.	LHN	vs. Nicholls State*	—	Red and Charline McCombs Field • Austin, TX	9–0^{(5)}	**Simpson** (4–2)	Westbrook (0–2)	—	N/A	14–9	—	Box Score	Recap
March 12	5:30 p.m.	LHN	vs. Minnesota*	—	Red and Charline McCombs Field • Austin, TX	12–3^{(5)}	**Dolcini** (5–3)	Leavitt (6–5)	—	1,262	15–9	—	Box Score	Recap
March 13	12:00 p.m.	LHN	vs. Drake*	—	Red and Charline McCombs Field • Austin, TX	7–0	**Czech** (5–1)	Timmons (2–6)	—	1,011	16–9	—	Box Score	Recap
March 13	12:00 p.m.	LHN	vs. Minnesota*	—	Red and Charline McCombs Field • Austin, TX	10–10	—	–	—	1,116	16–9–1	—	Box Score	Recap
March 16	4:00 p.m.	ESPN+	at No. 23 Louisiana*	—	Yvette Girouard Field at Lamson Park • Lafayette, LA	10–2	**Czech** (6–1)	Lamb (5–4)	—	N/A	17–9–1	—	Box Score	Recap
March 16	6:30 p.m.	ESPN+	at No. 23 Louisiana*	—	Yvette Girouard Field at Lamson Park • Lafayette, LA	3–2	**Dolcini** (6–3)	Landry (5–2)	—	1,947	18–9–1	—	Box Score	Recap
March 18	6:00 p.m.	LHN	vs. No. 20 LSU*	—	Red and Charline McCombs Field • Austin, TX	3–0	**Czech** (7–1)	Kilponen (9–4)	—	1,212	19–9–1	—	Box Score	Recap
March 19	2:00 p.m.	LHN	vs. No. 20 LSU*	—	Red and Charline McCombs Field • Austin, TX	4–0	**Dolcini** (7–3)	Chaffin (4–1)	–	N/A	20–9–1	—	Box Score	Recap
March 19	4:30	LHN	vs. No. 20 LSU*	—	Red and Charline McCombs Field • Austin, TX	11–10	**Czech** (8–1)	Sunseri (5–2)	—	1,292	21–9–1	—	Box Score	Recap
March 22	4:00 p.m.	LHN	vs. Lamar*	No. 24	Red and Charline McCombs Field • Austin, TX	8–0^{(5)}	**Dolcini** (8–3)	Ruiz (4–12)	—	766	22–9–1	—	Box Score	Recap
March 23	6:00 p.m.	ESPN+	at Texas State*	No. 24	Bobcat Softball Stadium • San Marcos, TX	4–2	**Dolcini** (9–3)	Mullins (9–9)	—	988	23–9–1	—	Box Score	Recap
March 25	6:00 p.m.	N/A	at Kansas	No. 24	Arrocha Ballpark at Rock Chalk Park • Lawrence, KS	7–6	**Dolcini** (10–3)	Hamilton (5–8)	—	257	24–9–1	1–0	Box Score	Recap
March 26	2:00 p.m.	N/A	at Kansas	No. 24	Arrocha Ballpark at Rock Chalk Park • Lawrence, KS	9–2	**Dolcini** (11–3)	Brooks (3–5)	—	396	25–9–1	2–0	Box Score	Recap
March 27	12:00 p.m.	N/A	at Kansas	No. 24	Arrocha Ballpark at Rock Chalk Park • Lawrence, KS	11–2^{(5)}	**Simpson** (5–2)	Hamilton (5–8)	—	368	26–9–1	3–0	Box Score	Recap
March 30	6:00 p.m.	LHN	vs. Louisiana*	No. 21	Red and Charline McCombs Field • Austin, TX	5–6^{(8)}	Schorman (5–2)	**Dolcini** (11–4)	—	1,123	26–10–1	—	Box Score	Recap

April (9–5)
Date	Time (CT)	TV	Opponent	Rank	Stadium	Score	Win	Loss	Save	Attendance	Overall record	Big 12 Record	Box Score	Recap
April 1	6:00 p.m.	LHN	vs. Iowa State	No. 21	Red and Charline McCombs Field • Austin, TX	7–5	**Dolcini** (12–4)	Spelhaug (5–10)	—	1,379	27–10–1	4–0	Box Score	Recap
April 2	1:00 p.m.	LHN	vs. Iowa State	No. 21	Red and Charline McCombs Field • Austin, TX	11–10^{(8)}	**Dolcini** (13–4)	Spelhaug (5–11)	—	1,464	28–10–1	5–0	Box Score	Recap
April 3	12:00 p.m.	LHN	vs. Iowa State	No. 21	Red and Charline McCombs Field • Austin, TX	7–2	**Czech** (9–1)	Charles (7–3)	—	1,463	29–10–1	6–0	Box Score	Recap
April 6	6:00 p.m.	LHN	vs. UT Arlington*	No. 19	Red and Charline McCombs Field • Austin, TX	14–4	**Simpson** (6–2)	Adams (9–10)	—	923	30–10–1	—	Box Score	Recap
April 14	6:00 p.m.	LHN	vs. No. 1 Oklahoma	No. 18	Red and Charline McCombs Field • Austin, TX	0–3	Bahl (16–0)	**Dolcini** (13–5)	—	1,498	30–11–1	6–1	Box Score	Recap
April 15	6:00 p.m.	LHN	vs. No. 1 Oklahoma	No. 18	Red and Charline McCombs Field • Austin, TX	1–9^{(5)}	Trautwein (11–0)	**Simpson** (6–3)	—	1,687	30–12–1	6–2	Box Score	Recap
April 16	1:00 p.m.	LHN	vs. No. 1 Oklahoma	No. 18	Red and Charline McCombs Field • Austin, TX	4–2 (Note: The Longhorns first win over Oklahoma since 2014. On the same day, Cat Osterman’s number 8 was retired by the University of Texas.)	**Dolcini** (14–5)	Bahl (16–1)	–	1,698 (Note: Broke the largest capacity record in Red and Charline McCombs Field history.)	31–12–1	7–2	Box Score	Recap
April 20	7:00 p.m.	LHN	vs. Houston*	No. 16	Red and Charline McCombs Field • Austin, TX	6–4	**Czech** (10–1)	Wilkey (8–7)	**Dolcini** (1)	1,342	32–12–1	—	Box Score	Recap
April 22	6:00 p.m.	N/A	at No. 6 Oklahoma State	No. 16	Cowgirl Stadium • Stillwater, OK	2–3^{(9)}	Maxwell (15–1)	**Dolcini** (14–6)	—	873	32–13–1	7–3	Box Score	Recap
April 24 (Note: Was originally scheduled for 6:30 p.m. on April 23. The game was postponed to April 24 due to inclement weather.)	11:00 a.m.	ESPN+	at No. 6 Oklahoma State	No. 16	Cowgirl Stadium • Stillwater, OK	0–3	Elish (13–4)	**Simpson** (6–4)	—	850	32–14–1	7–4	Box Score	Recap
April 24	1:00 p.m.	ESPN+	at No. 6 Oklahoma State (Note: Janae Jefferson hit her 333rd career hit, breaking the all-time Big 12 record.)	No. 16	Cowgirl Stadium • Stillwater, OK	1–2	Day (9–2)	**Dolcini** (14–7)	Maxwell (2)	902	32–15–1	7–5	Box Score	Recap
April 29	5:00 p.m.	ESPN+	at Texas Tech	No. 17	Rocky Johnson Field • Lubbock, TX	5–4	**Dolcini** (15–7)	Rains (1–7)	—	573	33–15–1	8–5	Box Score	Recap
April 30	12:00 p.m.	ESPN+	at Texas Tech	No. 17	Rocky Johnson Field • Lubbock, TX	11–1^{(5)}	**Simpson** (7–4)	Carlin (7–7)	—	N/A	34–15–1	9–5	Box Score	Recap
April 30	2:30 p.m.	ESPN+	at Texas Tech	No. 17	Rocky Johnson Field • Lubbock, TX	7–6	**Dolcini** (16–7)	Rains (1–8)	**Simpson** (1)	1,175	35–15–1	10–5	Box Score	Recap

May (2–1)
Date	Time (CT)	TV	Opponent	Rank	Stadium	Score	Win	Loss	Save	Attendance	Overall record	Big 12 Record	Box Score	Recap
May 6	6:30 p.m.	ESPN+	at Baylor	No. 17	Getterman Stadium • Waco, TX	10–6	**Dolcini** (17–7)	Dariana (12–13)	—	1,250	36–15–1	11–5	Box Score	Recap
May 7	1:00 p.m.	LHN	vs. Baylor	No. 17	Red and Charline McCombs Field • Austin, TX	3–17	Binford (9–6)	**O’Leary** (1–4)	—	1,505	36–16–1	11–6	Box Score	Recap
May 8	1:00 p.m.	LHN	vs. Baylor	No. 17	Red and Charline McCombs Field • Austin, TX	6–0	**Dolcini** (18–7)	Orme (12–14)	—	1,526	37–16–1	12–6	Box Score	Recap

Postseason (10–6)

Big 12 softball tournament (1–1)
Date	Time (CT)	TV	Opponent	Seed	Stadium	Score	Win	Loss	Save	Attendance	Overall record	Tournament record	Box Score	Recap
May 12	6:00 p.m.	ESPN+	vs. (6) Texas Tech	(3)	USA Softball Hall of Fame Stadium • Oklahoma City, OK	9–1^{(5)}	**Dolcini** (19–7)	Fritz (12–9)	—	3,097	38–16–1	1–0	Box Score	Recap
May 13	4:00 p.m.	ESPN+	vs. (2) Oklahoma State	(3)	USA Softball Hall of Fame Stadium • Oklahoma City, OK	1–6	Day (10–4)	**Dolcini** (19–8)	—	3,936	38–17–1	1–1	Box Score	Recap

NCAA Seattle Regional (3–1)
Date	Time (CT)	TV	Opponent	Rank	Stadium	Score	Win	Loss	Save	Attendance	Overall record	Regional Record	Box Score	Recap
May 20	4:30 p.m.	LHN	vs. Weber State	No. 16	Husky Softball Stadium • Seattle, WA	6–0	**Czech** (11–1)	Henderson (6–2)	—	1,701	39–17–1	1–0	Box Score	Recap
May 21	4:00 p.m.	ESPN	vs. Washington	No. 16	Husky Softball Stadium • Seattle, WA	8–2	**Dolcini** (20–8)	Plain (20–6)	—	1,719	40–17–1	2–0	Box Score	Recap
May 22	5:00 p.m.	ESPN+	vs. Washington	No. 16	Husky Softball Stadium • Seattle, WA	1–2	Plain (21–6)	**Dolcini** (20–9)	—	1,705	40–18–1	2–1	Box Score	Recap
May 22	4:00 p.m.	ESPNU	vs. Washington	No. 16	Husky Softball Stadium • Seattle, WA	3–2	**Dolcini** (21–9)	Plain (21–7)	—	1,706	41–18–1	3–1	Box Score	Recap

NCAA Fayetteville Super Regional (2–1)
Date	Time (CT)	TV	Opponent	Rank	Stadium	Score	Win	Loss	Save	Attendance	Overall record	Regional Record	Box Score	Recap
May 26	6:00 p.m.	ESPN2	vs. No. 4 Arkansas	No. 16	Bogle Park • Fayetteville, AR	1–7	Delce (19–2)	**Dolcini** (21–10)	—	3,100	41–19–1	0–1	Box Score	Recap
May 27	5:30 p.m.	ESPN2	vs. No. 4 Arkansas	No. 16	Bogle Park • Fayetteville, AR	3–1	**Dolcini** (22–10)	Haff (20–5)	—	3,170	42–19–1	1–1	Box Score	Recap
May 28	3:00 p.m.	ESPN	vs. No. 4 Arkansas	No. 16	Bogle Park • Fayetteville, AR	3–0 (Note: The first super regional championship and Women’s College World Series appearance for Texas since 2013.)	**Simpson** (8–4)	Delce (19–3)	—	3,115	43–19–1	2–1	Box Score	Recap

Women’s College World Series (4–3)
Date	Time (CT)	TV	Opponent	Rank	Stadium	Score	Win	Loss	Save	Attendance	Overall record	WCWS Record	Box Score	Recap
June 2	11:00 a.m.	ESPN	vs. No. 5 UCLA	No. 16	USA Softball Hall of Fame Stadium • Oklahoma City, OK	7–2	**Dolcini** (23–10)	Faraimo (22–5)	—	–	44–19–1	1–0	Box Score	Recap
June 4	2:00 p.m.	ABC	vs. No. 1 Oklahoma	No. 16	USA Softball Hall of Fame Stadium • Oklahoma City, OK	2–7	Trautwein (20–1)	**Dolcini** (23–11)	—	–	44–20–1	1–1	Box Score	Recap
June 5	6:00 p.m.	ESPN2	vs. Arizona	No. 16	USA Softball Hall of Fame Stadium • Oklahoma City, OK	5–2	**Czech** (12–1)	Bowen (14–12)	—	12,403	45–20–1	2–1	Box Score	Recap
June 6	6:00 p.m.	ESPN	vs. No. 6 Oklahoma State	No. 16	USA Softball Hall of Fame Stadium • Oklahoma City, OK	5–0	**Czech** (13–1)	Day (13–5)	—	–	46–20–1	3–1	Box Score	Recap
June 6	8:45 p.m.	ESPN	vs. No. 6 Oklahoma State	No. 16	USA Softball Hall of Fame Stadium • Oklahoma City, OK	6–5	**Dolcini** (24–11)	Maxwell (21–5)	—	12,135	47–20–1	4–1	Box Score	Recap
June 8	7:30 p.m.	ESPN	vs. No. 1 Oklahoma; Champhionship Series	No. 16	USA Softball Hall of Fame Stadium • Oklahoma City, OK	1–16	Trautwein (22–1)	**Dolcini** (24–12)	—	12,234	47–21–1	4–2	Box Score	Recap
June 9	6:30 p.m.	ESPN2	vs. No. 1 Oklahoma; Champhionship Series	No. 16	USA Softball Hall of Fame Stadium • Oklahoma City, OK	5–10	Bahl (22–1)	**Czech** (13–2)	—	12,257	47–22–1	4–3	Box Score	Recap

* indicates a non-conference game. All rankings from D1Baseball on the date of the contest.

Schedule Notes

== Postseason ==
=== Big 12 Tournament ===
First Round; Thursday, May 12
4	Iowa State	2
5	Baylor	1
2	Oklahoma State	2
7	Kansas	0
3	Texas	9
6	Texas Tech ‍‍‍	1

Semi-finals; Friday, May 13
1	Oklahoma	5
4	Iowa State	0
2	Oklahoma State	6
3	Texas	1

Championship; Saturday, May 14
1	Oklahoma	3
2	Oklahoma State	4^{(8)}

=== Fayetteville Super Regional ===
Round 1	Round 2
4	Arkansas	11^{(5)}
Princeton	0
4	Arkansas	6
Oregon	2
Wichita State	2
Oregon	10^{(5)}
Fayetteville Regional – Bogle Park
Princeton	4
Wichita State	5
Oregon	8
Wichita State	1
13	Washington	9
Lehigh	2
13	Washington	2
Texas	8
Weber State	0
Texas	6
Seattle Regional – Husky Softball Stadium
Lehigh	5
Weber State	4
13	Washington	6
Lehigh	1

Regional Finals
4	Arkansas	9	—
Oregon	3	—
Texas	1	3
13	Washington	2	2

Super Regionals
4	Arkansas	7	1	0
Texas	1	3	3

=== Women's College World Series ===
First round
1	Oklahoma	13^{(5)}
9	Northwestern	2
5	UCLA	2
Texas	7
9	Northwestern	1
5	UCLA	6
14	Florida	7
Oregon State	1
7	Oklahoma State	4
Arizona	2
Oregon State	1
Arizona	3

Second round
1	Oklahoma	7
Texas	2
14	Florida	0
5	UCLA	8^{(6)}
14	Florida	0
7	Oklahoma State	2
Texas	5
Arizona	2

Semifinals
1	Oklahoma	3	15^{(5)}
5	UCLA	7	0
7	Oklahoma State	0	5
Texas	5	6

Finals
1	Oklahoma	16	10	—
Texas	1	5	—

== Awards, accomplishments, and honors ==
=== All-Americans ===
Second Team All-Americans
Player	No.	Position	Class	Selector(s)
Janae Jefferson	2	IF	Junior	NFCA

Third Team All-Americans
Player	No.	Position	Class	Selector(s)
Hailey Dolcini	27	P	Senior	NFCA

=== National honors ===
National honors
Honors	Player	Position	Ref.
Women’s College World Series All-Tournament Team	Estelle Czech	P	
Women’s College World Series All-Tournament Team	Courtney Day	1B/DP	
Women’s College World Series All-Tournament Team	Bella Dayton	OF	

=== Conference honors ===
Conference honors
Honors	Player	Position	Ref.
All-Big 12 First Team	Hailey Dolcini	P	
All-Big 12 First Team	Janae Jefferson	IF	
All-Big 12 First Team	Mary Iakopo	C/1B	
All-Big 12 Second Team	Alyssa Washington	IF	
All-Big 12 Second Team	Mia Scott	IF	
All-Big 12 Freshman Team	Katie Cimusz	C/1B	
All-Big 12 Freshman Team	Mia Scott	IF	
All-Big 12 Freshman Team	Sophia Scott	P	
Big 12 All-Tournament Team	Janae Jefferson	IF	
Big 12 All-Tournament Team	Mia Scott	IF	

=== Weekly honors ===
Weekly honors
Honors	Player	Position	Date Awarded	Ref.
Big 12 Player of the Week	Katie Cimusz	C	March 8, 2022	
Big 12 Player of the Week	McKenzie Parker	IF	March 22, 2022	
Big 12 Player of the Week	Mary Iakopo	C	April 5, 2022	
Big 12 Pitcher of the Week	Hailey Dolcini	P	March 29, 2022	
Big 12 Pitcher of the Week	Hailey Dolcini	P	April 19, 2022	
Big 12 Pitcher of the Week	Hailey Dolcini	P	May 10, 2022	

=== Records ===
Records
Record	Player	Position	Stat	Ref.
Big 12 Career Hits	Janae Jefferson	IF	333	

=== No-hitters ===
Date	Pitcher	Opponent	IP	K	BB	HBP	E	Score	Source
February 27, 2022	Sophia Simpson	UTSA	6	12	4	0	0	8-0	

== Statistics ==
=== Team batting ===
Team	AB	Avg.	H	2B	3B	HR	RBI	BB	SO	SB
Texas	1,850	.303	560	116	13	68	355	224	297	97
Opponents	1,771	.237	419	77	5	62	237	166	449	34

=== Team pitching ===
Team	IP	H	R	ER	BB	SO	SV	ERA
Texas	460.1	419	267	215	166	449	2	3.27
Opponents	445.1	560	397	313	224	297	4	4.92

=== Individual batting ===
Player	GP	AB	Avg.	H	2B	3B	HR	RBI	BB	SO	SB
Janae Jefferson	70	226	.407	92	24	2	7	34	31	12	16
Mia Scott	64	204	.377	77	14	5	4	38	25	29	26
Mary Iakopo	67	191	.335	64	15	1	11	58	27	18	2
Courtney Day	58	130	.300	39	10	0	12	34	15	24	1
Alyssa Washington	65	172	.279	48	10	0	5	35	22	29	3
Bella Dayton	68	156	.276	43	9	1	5	23	24	26	14
McKenzie Parker	55	155	.265	41	10	0	8	42	20	32	3
Katie Cimusz	60	156	.244	38	8	0	9	32	15	36	5
Camille Corona	34	10	.500	5	0	0	0	1	0	0	3
Alyssa Popelka	64	92	.348	32	0	2	0	7	12	18	16
JJ Smith	42	78	.282	22	6	1	2	13	9	11	1
Lauren Burke	47	106	.255	27	7	0	1	14	8	17	0
Brianna Cantu	27	30	.233	7	0	0	1	8	5	5	2
Lou Gilbert	56	60	.217	13	0	1	1	9	4	8	5
Jordyn Whitaker	43	62	.177	11	3	0	2	6	6	24	0
Vanessa Quiroga	9	10	.100	0	0	0	0	0	0	0	0
Mya Holmes	13	12	.000	0	0	0	0	0	1	4	0

=== Individual pitching ===
Player	GP	GS	W	L	IP	H	R	ER	BB	SO	SV	ERA
Hailey Dolcini	43	32	24	12	216.0	145	99	78	66	217	1	2.53
Estelle Czech	30	16	13	2	103.2	120	58	48	25	83	0	3.24
Sophia Simpson	29	16	8	4	86.1	82	53	44	50	105	1	3.57
Courtney Day	3	0	0	0	6.1	8	6	2	4	2	0	2.21
Shea O’Leary	19	5	1	4	26.2	40	28	23	12	27	0	6.04
Logan Hulon	13	1	1	0	21.1	24	23	20	9	15	0	6.56

Legend
GP	Games played	GS	Games started	AB	At-bats
H	Hits	Avg.	Batting average	2B	Doubles
3B	Triples	HR	Home runs	RBI	Runs batted In
IP	Innings pitched	W	Wins	L	Losses
ERA	Earned run average	SO	Strikeouts	BB	Base on balls
SV	Saves	SB	Stolen bases	High	Team high

Note: leaders must meet the minimum requirement of 2 PA/G and 75% of games played (Hitting)
Note: leaders must meet the minimum requirement of 1 IP/G (Pitching)

== Rankings ==
Ranking movements Legend: ██ Increase in ranking ██ Decrease in ranking — = Not ranked
	Week																
Poll	Pre	1	2	3	4	5	6	7	8	9	10	11	12	13	14	15	Final
NFCA / USA Today	10	11	23	—	—	—	24	21	19	18	16	17	17	16	16	16	2
Softball America	11	11	—	—	—	25	16	14	14	13	12	15	12	14	17	12	2
ESPN.com/USA Softball	8	9	24	—	—	—	23	19	19	18	16	16	14	16	18	18	2
D1Softball	9	10	—	—	—	25	16	15	15	14	14	15	14	15	15	15	4
