= 2022 Oklahoma Sooners softball team =

NCAA Division I college softball season

2022 Oklahoma Sooners softball

National Champion NCAA Norman Super Regional champion NCAA Norman Regional champion Big 12 regular season champion
- Conference: Big 12 Conference
- Record: 59–3 (17–1 Big 12)
- Head coach: Patty Gasso (28th season)
- Home stadium: OU Softball Complex

2022 Big 12 Conference softball standings
	Conf.						Overall
Team	W		L		T	PCT	W		L		T	PCT
No. 1 Oklahoma ‍†‍‍^{y}	17	–	1	–	0	.944	59	–	3	–	0	.952
No. 7 Oklahoma State ‍‍‡‍^{y}	14	–	4	–	0	.778	48	–	14	–	0	.774
No. 17 Texas ‍‍‍^{y}	12	–	6	–	0	.667	47	–	22	–	1	.679
Iowa State ‍‍‍	6	–	12	–	0	.333	28	–	27	–	0	.509
Baylor ‍‍‍	6	–	12	–	0	.333	32	–	24	–	0	.571
Texas Tech ‍‍‍	5	–	13	–	0	.278	22	–	27	–	0	.449
Kansas ‍‍‍	3	–	15	–	0	.167	20	–	36	–	0	.357
† – Conference champion ‡ – Tournament champion y – Invited to the NCAA tournament As of June 9, 2022; Rankings from NFCA/USA Today

The 2022 Oklahoma Sooners softball team was an American college softball team that represented the University of Oklahoma during the 2022 NCAA Division I softball season. The Sooners were led by Patty Gasso in her twenty-eighth season, and played their home games at OU Softball Complex. They competed in the Big 12 Conference, where they finished the season with a 59–3 record, including 17–1 in conference play.

== Previous season ==
The Sooners finished the 2021 season 56–4 overall, and 16–1 in the Big 12, finishing in first place in their conference. Following the conclusion of the regular season, the Sooners received an automatic bid to the 2021 NCAA Division I softball tournament after winning the Big 12 Tournament. During the NCAA tournament they defeated Morgan State in the regional finals and Washington in the super regionals. They won the 2021 Women's College World Series over Florida State.

== Preseason ==
Oklahoma was ranked No. 1 in the nation in the preseason polls by NFCA/USA Today, ESPN.com/USA Softball, D1Softball and Softball America.

=== Award watch lists ===
Award	Player	Position	Year	Ref.
USA Softball Collegiate Player of the Year	Jocelyn Alo	Utility	Senior	
USA Softball Collegiate Player of the Year	Jayda Coleman	Outfielder	Sophomore	
USA Softball Collegiate Player of the Year	Kinzie Hansen	Catcher	Junior	
USA Softball Collegiate Player of the Year	Tiare Jennings	Infielder	Sophomore	

== Roster ==
2022 Oklahoma Sooners roster
Pitchers: 7 – Hope Trautwein – Redshirt Senior; 13 – Macy McAdoo – Junior; 19 – Nicole May – Sophomore; 88 – Emmy Guthrie – Freshman; 98 – Jordy Bahl – Freshman; Catchers: 9 – Kinzie Hansen – Junior; 22 – Lynnsie Elam – Redshirt Senior; Outfielders: 0 – Rylie Boone – Junior; 27 – Hannah Coor – Freshman	Infielders: 3 – Grace Lyons – Senior; 5 – Taylon Snow – Redshirt Senior; 11 – Alexx Waitman – Freshman; 20 – Jana Johns – Redshirt Senior; 23 – Tiare Jennings – Sophomore; 33 – Zaida Puni – Freshman; Utility: 12 – Mackenzie Donihoo – Junior; 17 – Sophia Nugent – Freshman; 21 – Grace Green – Senior; 24 – Jayda Coleman – Sophomore; 33 – Alyssa Brito – Sophomore; 42 – Turiya Coleman – Freshman; 43 – Quincee Lilio – Freshman; 78 – Jocelyn Alo – Redshirt Senior

== Schedule ==
2022 Oklahoma Sooners softball game log
Regular season (48–1)

February (15–0)
Date	Opponent	Rank	Site/stadium	Score	Win	Loss	Save	Attendance	Overall Record	Big 12 Record
February 10	at UC Santa Barbara	No. 1	Santa Barbara Diamond; Santa Barbara, CA	14–0 ^{(5)}	**Bahl** (1–0)	Mills (0–1)	—	256	1–0	–
February 11	vs Loyola Marymount	No. 1	Bill Barber Park; Irvine, CA	5–0	**Trautwein** (1–0)	Johnson (0–1)	**Bahl** (1)	300	2–0	–
February 11	vs Mississippi State	No. 1	Bill Barber Park	9–0 ^{(5)}	**May** (1–0)	Bower (0–1)	—	300	3–0	–
February 12	vs No. 3 UCLA	No. 1	Bill Barker Park	4–1	**Bahl** (2–0)	Shaw (1–1)	—	1,000	4–0	–
February 13	vs UC San Diego	No. 1	Bill Barker Park	8–0 ^{(5)}	**Trautwein** (2–0)	Williams (0–3)	—	350	5–0	–
February 18	vs McNeese State	No. 1	Cougar Softball Stadium; Houston, TX	15–1 ^{(5)}	**Bahl** (3–0)	Tate (1–1)	—	—	6–0	–
February 18	at Houston	No. 1	Cougar Softball Stadium	8–0 ^{(5)}	**May** (2–0)	Flores (0–2)	—	—	7–0	–
February 19	vs McNeese State	No. 1	Cougar Softball Stadium	11–0 ^{(5)}	**Trautwein** (3–0)	Vallejo (3–2)	—	—	8–0	–
February 19	at Houston	No. 1	Cougar Softball Stadium	13–0 ^{(5)}	**Bahl** (4–0)	Wilkey (2–2)	—	—	9–0	–
February 20	vs Texas State	No. 1	Cougar Softball Stadium	8–0 ^{(5)}	**May** (3–0)	Mullins (1–2)	—	—	10–0	–
February 25	vs Cal State Fullerton	No. 1	Big League Dreams Complex; Cathedral City, CA	10–0 ^{(6)}	**Bahl** (5–0)	Chambers (3–1)	—	800	11–0	–
February 25	vs Long Beach State	No. 1	Big League Dreams Complex	11–3 ^{(5)}	**May** (4–0)	Frutoz (0–2)	—	850	12–0	–
February 26	vs No. 8 Arizona	No. 1	Big League Dreams Complex	10–2 ^{(5)}	**May** (5–0)	Netz (4–1)	—	850	13–0	–
February 26	vs No. 17 Tennessee	No. 1	Big League Dreams Complex	9–8 ^{(10)}	**Bahl** (6–0)	Rogers (3–2)	—	2,000	14–0	–
February 27	vs Utah	No. 1	Big League Dreams Complex	3–2	**Trautwein** (4–0)	Sandez (5–1)	—	800	15–0	–

March (15–0)
Date	Opponent	Rank	Site/stadium	Score	Win	Loss	Save	Attendance	Overall Record	Big 12 Record
March 7	Minnesota	No. 1	OU Softball Complex; Norman, OK	9–1 ^{(5)}	**Bahl** (7–0)	Pease (5–4)	—	1,531	16–0	–
March 10	vs Baylor	No. 1	Rainbow Wahine Softball Stadium; Honolulu, HI	12–3 ^{(5)}	**May** (6–0)	Orme (3–5)	—	—	17–0	–
March 11	vs California	No. 1	Rainbow Wahine Softball Stadium	8–0 ^{(5)}	**Bahl** (8–0)	Archer (6–4)	—	—	18–0	–
March 11	at Hawaii	No. 1	Rainbow Wahine Softball Stadium	11–0 ^{(6)}	**Trautwein** (5–0)	Murphy (0–2)	—	1,200	19–0	–
March 12	at Hawaii	No. 1	Rainbow Wahine Softball Stadium	9–0 ^{(5)}	**May** (7–0)	Borges (3–3)	—	—	20–0	–
March 18	vs Sam Houston	No. 1	Hall of Fame Stadium; Oklahoma City, OK	10–1 ^{(5)}	**Trautwein** (6–0)	Dunn (2–4)	—	4,718	21–0	–
March 18	vs Indiana	No. 1	Hall of Fame Stadium	15–1 ^{(5)}	**Bahl** (9–0)	Copeland (4–3)	—	4,718	22–0	–
March 19	vs San Diego	No. 1	Hall of Fame Stadium	11–0 ^{(5)}	**May** (8–0)	Daugherty (1–7)	—	4,936	23–0	–
March 19	vs Houston	No. 1	Hall of Fame Stadium	8–0 ^{(5)}	**Trautwein** (7–0)	Todd (3–4)	—	4,936	24–0	–
March 20	vs Iowa	No. 1	Hall of Fame Stadium	20–0 ^{(5)}	**Bahl** (10–0)	Vasquez (5–5)	—	3,246	25–0	–
March 22	vs Kentucky	No. 1	John Cropp Stadium	9–1 ^{(6)}	**Bahl** (11–0)	Stoddard (5–3)	—	2,117	26–0	–
March 25	Baylor	No. 1	OU Softball Complex	9–1 ^{(5)}	**Bahl** (12–0)	Orme (6–7)	—	1,782	27–0	1–0
March 26	Baylor	No. 1	OU Softball Complex	8–0 ^{(5)}	**May** (9–0)	Binford (5–3)	—	1,717	28–0	2–0
March 27	Baylor	No. 1	OU Softball Complex	3–1	**Trautwein** (8–0)	Orme (6–8)	—	1,689	29–0	3–0
March 29	Wichita State	No. 1	OU Softball Complex	10–1 ^{(5)}	**Bahl** (13–0)	Bingham (7–2)	—	1,589	30–0	–

April (14–1)
Date	Opponent	Rank	Site/stadium	Score	Win	Loss	Save	Attendance	Overall Record	Big 12 Record
April 1	UAB	No. 1	OU Softball Complex	11–1 ^{(5)}	**Bahl** (14–0)	Valbak (3–5)	—	1,653	31–0	–
April 2	UAB	No. 1	OU Softball Complex	2–0	**Trautwein** (9–0)	Cespedes (8–3)	—	1,708	32–0	–
April 6	Tulsa	No. 1	OU Softball Complex	9–0 ^{(5)}	**May** (10–0)	Pochop (7–11)	—	1,700	33–0	–
April 8	at Texas Tech	No. 1	Rocky Johnson Field; Lubbock, TX	11–0 ^{(5)}	**Bahl** (15–0)	Carlin (6–3)	—	1,100	34–0	4–0
April 9	at Texas Tech	No. 1	Rocky Johnson Field	11–0 ^{(5)}	**Trautwein** (10–0)	Rains (0–5)	—	1,209	35–0	5–0
April 10	at Texas Tech	No. 1	Rocky Johnson Field	21–0 ^{(5)}	**May** (11–0)	Carlin (6–4)	—	1,260	36–0	6–0
April 14	at No. 18 Texas	No. 1	Red and Charline McCombs Field; Austin, TX	3–0	**Bahl** (16–0)	Dolcini (13–5)	—	1,498	37–0	7–0
April 15	at No. 18 Texas	No. 1	Red and Charline McCombs Field	9–1 ^{(5)}	**Trautwein** (11–0)	Simpson (6–3)	—	1,687	38–0	8–0
April 16	at No. 18 Texas	No. 1	Red and Charline McCombs Field	2–4	Dolcini (14–5)	**Bahl** (16–1)	—	1,698	38–1	8–1
April 20	at North Texas	No. 1	Lovelace Stadium; Denton, TX	10–0 ^{(6)}	**Bahl** (17–1)	Savage (10–5)	—	476	39–1	—
April 22	Iowa State	No. 1	OU Softball Complex	6–4	**Bahl** (18–1)	Spelhaug (7–14)	**Trautwein** (1)	1,650	40–1	9–1
April 22	Iowa State	No. 1	OU Softball Complex	9–0 ^{(5)}	**Trautwein** (12–0)	Spelhaug (7–15)	—	1,650	41–1	10–1
April 23	Iowa State	No. 1	OU Softball Complex	9–0 ^{(5)}	**Bahl** (19–1)	Swain (6–4)	—	1,695	42–1	11–1
April 28	at Kansas City	No. 1	Urban Youth Academy Softball Complex; Kansas City, MO	Canceled						
April 29	at Kansas	No. 1	Arrocha Ballpark at Rock Chalk Park; Lawrence, KS	7–0	**Bahl** (20–1)	Hamilton (6–15)	—	1,084	43–1	12–1
April 30	at Kansas	No. 1	Arrocha Ballpark at Rock Chalk Park	19–0 ^{(5)}	**Trautwein** (13–0)	Brooks (5–7)	—	1,204	44–1	13–1

May (4–0)
Date	Opponent	Rank	Site/stadium	Score	Win	Loss	Save	Attendance	Overall Record	Big 12 Record
May 1	at Kansas	No. 1	Arrocha Ballpark at Rock Chalk Park	9–1	**May** (12–0)	Hamilton (7–16)	—	1,224	45–1	14–1
May 5	No. 7 Oklahoma State	No. 1	OU Softball Complex	7–1	**Bahl** (21–1)	Maxwell (15–3)	—	1,759	46–1	15–1
May 6	No. 7 Oklahoma State	No. 1	OU Softball Complex	6–0	**Trautwein** (14–0)	Day (9–4)	—	1,805	47–1	16–1
May 7	No. 7 Oklahoma State	No. 1	OU Softball Complex	5–3	**Trautwein** (15–0)	Maxwell (15–4)	**May** (1)	1,170	48–1	17–1

Postseason (11–2)

Big 12 Tournament (1–1)
Date	Opponent	Rank	Site/stadium	Score	Win	Loss	Save	Attendance	Overall Record	B12T Record
May 13	vs. Iowa State	No. 1	Hall of Fame Stadium	5–0	**Trautwein** (16–0)	Spelhaug (11–18)	—	—	49–1	1–0
May 14	vs. No. 7 Oklahoma State	No. 1	Hall of Fame Stadium	3–4 ^{(8)}	Day (11–4)	**Trautwein** (16–1)	—	5,410	49–2	1–1

Norman Regional (3–0)
Date	Opponent	Rank	Site/stadium	Score	Win	Loss	Save	Attendance	Overall Record	Regional Record
May 20	vs. Prairie View A&M	No. 1	OU Softball Complex	14–0 ^{(5)}	**May** (13–0)	Massey (12–12)	—	1,677	50–2	1–0
May 21	vs. Texas A&M	No. 1	OU Softball Complex	3–2	**Trautwein** (17–1)	Uribe (5–5)	—	—	51–2	2–0
May 22	vs. Texas A&M	No. 1	OU Softball Complex	20–0 ^{(5)}	**May** (14–0)	Herzog (9–8)	—	1,640	52–2	3–0

Norman Super Regional (2–0)
Date	Opponent	Rank	Site/stadium	Score	Win	Loss	Save	Attendance	Overall Record	Super Reg. Record
May 27	vs. UCF	No. 1	OU Softball Complex	8–0 ^{(5)}	**Trautwein** (18–1)	Mancha (23–4)	—	1,659	53–2	1–0
May 28	vs. UCF	No. 1	OU Softball Complex	7–1	**May** (15–0)	Woodall (18–5)	—	1,704	54–2	2–0

Women's College World Series (5–1)
Date	Opponent	Rank	Site/stadium	Score	Win	Loss	Save	Attendance	Overall Record	WCWS Record
June 2	vs. No. 10 Northwestern	No. 1	Hall of Fame Stadium	13–2 ^{(5)}	**Trautwein** (19–1)	Williams (31–5)	—	12,282	55–2	1–0
June 4	vs. No. 16 Texas	No. 1	Hall of Fame Stadium	7–2	**Trautwein** (20–1)	Dolcini (23–11)	—	—	56–2	2–0
June 6	vs. No. 5 UCLA	No. 1	Hall of Fame Stadium	3–7	Faraimo (24–5)	**May** (15–1)	Azevedo (2)	11,836	56–3	2–1
June 6	vs. No. 5 UCLA	No. 1	Hall of Fame Stadium	15–0 ^{(5)}	**Trautwein** (21–1)	Azevedo (21–3)	—	11,836	57–3	3–1
June 8	vs. No. 16 Texas	No. 1	Hall of Fame Stadium	16–1	**Trautwein** (22–1)	Dolcini (24–12)	—	12,234	58–3	4–1
June 9	vs. No. 16 Texas	No. 1	Hall of Fame Stadium	10–5	**Bahl** (22–1)	Czech (13–2)	—	12,257	59–3	5–1

- Win
- Loss
- Postponement
- Bold: Sooners team member
- Rankings from NFCA:
- (#) Tournament seedings in parentheses.

== Rankings ==
Ranking movements
	Week															
Poll	Pre	1	2	3	4	5	6	7	8	9	10	11	12	13	14	Final
NFCA / USA Today	1	1	1	1	1	1	1	1	1	1	1	1	1	1	1	1
Softball America	1	1	1	1	1	1	1	1	1	1	1	1	1	1	1	1
ESPN.com/USA Softball	1	1	1	1	1	1	1	1	1	1	1	1	1	1	1	1
D1Softball	1	1	1	1	1	1	1	1	1	1	1	1	1	1	1	1
