= 2022 Louisiana Ragin' Cajuns softball team =

American college softball season

2022 Louisiana Ragin' Cajuns softball

Sun Belt Conference Tournament champions Sun Belt Conference Regular season Champions

Clemson Regional appearance
- Conference: Sun Belt Conference
- Record: 47–13 (23–4 SBC)
- Head coach: Gerry Glasco (5th season)
- Assistant coaches: Lacy Prejean; Justin Robichaux
- Home stadium: Yvette Girouard Field at Lamson Park

2022 Sun Belt Conference softball standings
	Conf.				Overall
Team	W		L	PCT	W		L	PCT
Louisiana ‍†‍‡‍^{y}	23	–	4	.852	47	–	13	.783
South Alabama ‍‍‍	16	–	6	.727	26	–	21	.553
Texas State ‍‍‍	19	–	8	.704	39	–	19	.672
Troy ‍‍‍	15	–	12	.556	32	–	20	.615
UT Arlington ‍‍‍	12	–	15	.444	22	–	28	.440
Appalachian State ‍‍‍	10	–	15	.400	29	–	26	.527
Georgia State ‍‍‍	9	–	15	.375	21	–	34	.382
Louisiana–Monroe ‍‍‍	10	–	17	.370	27	–	27	.500
Coastal Carolina ‍‍‍	7	–	17	.292	25	–	29	.463
Georgia Southern ‍‍‍	6	–	18	.250	13	–	34	.277
† – Conference champion ‡ – Tournament champion y – Invited to the NCAA tournament As of June 5, 2022; Rankings from NFCA/USA Today

The 2022 Louisiana Ragin' Cajuns softball team represented the University of Louisiana at Lafayette during the 2022 NCAA Division I softball season. The Ragin' Cajuns played their home games at Yvette Girouard Field at Lamson Park and were led by fifth-year head coach Gerry Glasco. They were members of the Sun Belt Conference.

== Preseason ==
=== Sun Belt Conference Coaches Poll ===
The Sun Belt Conference Coaches Poll was released on January 31, 2022. Louisiana was picked to finish first in the conference with 97 votes and 7 first place votes.

Coaches poll
Predicted finish	Team	Votes (1st place)
1	Louisiana	97 (7)
2	Texas State	87 (2)
3	Troy	82 (1)
4	South Alabama	74
5	UT Arlington	49
6	Appalachian State	46
7	Coastal Carolina	37
8	Georgia Southern	32
9	Louisiana–Monroe	27
10	Georgia State	19

=== Preseason All-Sun Belt team ===
- Olivia Lackie (USA, Pitcher)
- Leanna Johnson (TROY, Pitcher)
- Kandra Lamb (LA, Pitcher)
- Jessica Mullins (TXST, Pitcher)
- Kamdyn Kvistad (USA, Catcher)
- Sophie Piskos (LA, Catcher)
- Faith Shirley (GASO, 1st Base)
- Kelly Horne (TROY, 2nd Base)
- Daisy Hess (GSU, Shortstop)
- Sara Vanderford (TXST, 3rd Base)
- Iyanla De Jesus (CCU, Designated Player)
- Raina O'Neal (LA, Outfielder)
- Mackenzie Brasher (USA, Outfielder)
- Emily Brown (GSU, Outfielder)
- Jade Sinness (TROY, Outfielder)

=== National Softball Signing Day ===
Player	Position	Hometown	Previous Team
Mihyia Davis	Outfielder	Lovelady, Texas	Lovelady HS
Kylei Griffin	Infielder	Tyler, Texas	Chapel Hill HS
Chloe Riassetto	Pitcher	Friendswood, Texas	Friendswood HS
Cecilia Vasquez	Infielder	New Waverly, Texas	New Waverly HS
Lauren Allred	Infielder	Texarkana, Texas	Texas HS
Kyleigh Pitzer	Pitcher	Mount Juliet, Tennessee	Wilson Central HS

== Personnel ==
2022 Louisiana Ragin' Cajuns softball team
Players
Coaches

#	Pos.	Name	Bats/throws	Height	Year	Home town
2	OF	Raina O'Neal	L/R	5 ft 6 in (1.68 m)	Sr	Richmond, Texas
3	OF	Maddie Hayden	L/R	5 ft 4 in (1.63 m)	Fr	West Monroe, Louisiana
5	INF	Frankie Izard	L/R	5 ft 2 in (1.57 m)	Jr	St. Joseph, Illinois
6	INF	Ari Quiñones	L/R	5 ft 3 in (1.6 m)	Jr	Vista, California
7	RHP	Karly Heath	L/R	5 ft 10 in (1.78 m)	Jr	North Augusta, South Carolina
8	INF	Taylor Roman (redshirt)	R/R	6 ft 0 in (1.83 m)	Fr	Missouri City, Texas
10	INF	Kramer Eschete	L/R	5 ft 6 in (1.68 m)	Fr	Brenham, Texas
12	RHP	Sam Landry	R/R	5 ft 10 in (1.78 m)	Fr	Mont Belvieu, Texas
13	INF	Jourdyn Campbell	R/R	5 ft 8 in (1.73 m)	So	Kingwood, Texas
14	RHP	Meghan Schorman	R/R	5 ft 7 in (1.7 m)	Jr	Hazelwood, Missouri
15	INF	Laney Credeur	L/R	5 ft 4 in (1.63 m)	Fr	Old Mines, Missouri
16	RHP	Tyler Oubre	R/R	5 ft 10 in (1.78 m)	Fr	Destrehan, Louisiana
19	C	Sophie Piskos	R/R	5 ft 4 in (1.63 m)	So	Paris, Tennessee
21	U	Melissa Mayeux	R/R	5 ft 8 in (1.73 m)	Sr	Le Barcares, France
22	INF	Stormy Kotzelnick (redshirt)	L/R	5 ft 3 in (1.6 m)	Fr	Carmel, Indiana
23	INF	Alexa Langeliers	R/R	5 ft 7 in (1.7 m)	Fr	Keller, Texas
26	RHP	Taylor Snow	R/R	5 ft 10 in (1.78 m)	Fr	Columbia, Louisiana
27	LHP	Vanessa Foreman	L/L	5 ft 10 in (1.78 m)	Jr	Lakewood, California
29	OF	Kayla Falterman	L/R	5 ft 4 in (1.63 m)	Fr	The Woodlands, Texas
33	OF	Samantha Graeter	R/R	5 ft 7 in (1.7 m)	Fr	Spring, Texas
44	OF	Jenna Kean	L/R	5 ft 8 in (1.73 m)	Sr	Los Alamitos, California
53	RHP	Kandra Lamb	R/R	6 ft 2 in (1.88 m)	Jr	Kurrajong, Australia

Head coach

Gerry Glasco (Illinois)

Assistant coach(es)

Lacy Prejean (Alabama)
Justin Robichaux (Louisiana)
Kevin Meyers (St. Francis)

Legend

- (C) Team captain
- (S) Suspended
- (I) Ineligible
- Injured
- Current redshirt

Roster
Last update: 8 June 2022

== Schedule and results ==
Legend
	Louisiana win
	Louisiana loss
	Postponement/Cancellation
**Bold**	Louisiana team member

2022 Louisiana Ragin' Cajuns softball game log
Regular season (41–11)

February (10–2)
Date	Opponent	Rank	Site/stadium	Score	Win	Loss	Save	TV	Attendance	Overall record	SBC record
Louisiana Classics
Feb. 11	UAB	No. 23	Yvette Girouard Field at Lamson Park • Lafayette, LA	**W** 2–0	**Lamb** (1-0)	Cespedes (0-1)	**Schorman** (1)		1,633	1–0	
Feb. 11	UAB	No. 23	Yvette Girouard Field at Lamson Park • Lafayette, LA	**W** 23–0^{5}	**Landry** (1-0)	Tindell (0-1)	None		1,633	2–0	
Feb. 12	North Texas	No. 23	Yvette Girouard Field at Lamson Park • Lafayette, LA	**W** 5–0	**Schorman** (1-0)	Cook (0-1)	None		1,750	3–0	
Feb. 12	Texas Southern	No. 23	Yvette Girouard Field at Lamson Park • Lafayette, LA	**W** 8–0^{5}	**Landry** (2-0)	Reyes (0-2)	None		1,750	4–0	
Feb. 13	Tulsa	No. 23	Yvette Girouard Field at Lamson Park • Lafayette, LA	**W** 8–0^{5}	**Lamb** (2-0)	Llamas-Howell (0-1)	None	ESPN+	1,574	5–0	
Feb. 15	Nicholls	No. 20	Yvette Girouard Field at Lamson Park • Lafayette, LA	**W** 10–2^{5}	**Landry** (3-0)	Lehman (0-1)	None	ESPN+	1,604	6–0	
Feb. 24	No. 2 Alabama	No. 20	Yvette Girouard Field at Lamson Park • Lafayette, LA	**L** 1–9^{5}	Kilfoyl (3-0)	**Schorman** (1-1)	None	ESPN+	2,714	6–1	
Mardi Gras Mambo
Feb. 25	vs. Eastern Illinois	No. 20	Youngsville Sports Complex • Youngsville, LA	**W** 3–2^{9}	**Schorman** (2-1)	Kaufman (1-2)	None		419	7–1	
Feb. 25	vs. St. Thomas	No. 20	Youngsville Sports Complex • Youngsville, LA	**W** 10-0^{5}	**Landry** (4-0)	Baniecke (1-2)	None		291	8–1	
Feb. 26	vs. Portland State	No. 20	Youngsville Sports Complex • Youngsville, LA	**W** 11–6	**Landry** (5-0)	Lemos (0-3)	None		748	9–1	
Feb. 26	vs. Lipscomb	No. 20	Youngsville Sports Complex • Youngsville, LA	**W** 11–3^{6}	**Heath** (1-0)	Barefoot (1-2)	None		332	10–1	
Feb. 27	vs. No. 2 Alabama	No. 20	Youngsville Sports Complex • Youngsville, LA	**L** 0–8^{5}	Fouts (6-0)	**Lamb** (2-1)	None		1,039	10–2	

March (11–6)
Date	Opponent	Rank	Site/stadium	Score	Win	Loss	Save	TV	Attendance	Overall record	SBC record
Mar. 1	at Stephen F. Austin	No. 21	SFA Softball Field • Nacogdoches, TX	Game postponed due to poor field conditions							
Mar. 1	at Stephen F. Austin	No. 21	SFA Softball Field • Nacogdoches, TX	Game postponed due to poor field conditions							
LSU-UL Crossover
Mar. 3	No. 22 LSU	No. 21	Yvette Girouard Field at Lamson Park • Lafayette, LA	**L** 0–4	Sunseri (4-1)	**Landry** (5-1)	Kilponen (1)	ESPN+	2,689	10–3	
Mar. 4	Central Connecticut	No. 21	Yvette Girouard Field at Lamson Park • Lafayette, LA	**W** 12–0^{5}	**Lamb** (3-1)	Marks (0-4)	None	ESPN+		11–3	
Mar. 4	Louisiana Tech	No. 21	Yvette Girouard Field at Lamson Park • Lafayette, LA	**W** 8–0^{6}	**Schorman** (3-1)	Menzina (1-2)	None	ERSPN+		12–3	
Mar. 5	at No. 22 LSU	No. 21	Tiger Park • Baton Rouge, LA	**L** 2–5	Kilponen (8-2)	**Lamb** (3-2)	Sunseri (1)	SECN+	2,142	12–4	
Mar. 9	McNeese State	No. 22	Yvette Girouard Field at Lamson Park • Lafayette, LA	**W** 5–3	**Lamb** (4-2)	Vallejo (5-5)	None		1,772	13–4	
Mar. 11	Georgia State	No. 22	Yvette Girouard Field at Lamson Park • Lafayette, LA	**L** 1–4	Adams (2-2)	**Lamb** (4-3)	None		1,439	13–5	0–1
Mar. 12	Georgia State	No. 22	Yvette Girouard Field at Lamson Park • Lafayette, LA	**W** 10–6	**Schorman** (4-1)	Mooney (0-4)	**Foreman** (1)		1,733	14–5	1–1
Mar. 13	Georgia State	No. 22	Yvette Girouard Field at Lamson Park • Lafayette, LA	**W** 9–0^{5}	**Lamb** (5-3)	Adams (2-3)	None		1,817	15–5	2–1
Mar. 16	Texas	No. 23	Yvette Girouard Field at Lamson Park • Lafayette, LA	**L** 2–10	Czech (6-1)	**Lamb** (5-4)	None	ESPN+	1,947	15–6	
Mar. 16	Texas	No. 23	Yvette Girouard Field at Lamson Park • Lafayette, LA	**L** 2–3	Dolcini (6-3)	**Landry** (5-2)	None	ESPN+	1,947	15–7	
Mar. 19	at Georgia Southern	No. 23	Eagle Field at GS Softball Complex • Statesboro, GA	**W** 11–3^{6}	**Landry** (6-2)	Belogorska (2-7)	None	ESPN+	351	16–7	3–1
Mar. 19	at Georgia Southern	No. 23	Eagle Field at GS Softball Complex • Statesboro, GA	**L** 10–12	Belogorska (3-7)	**Schorman** (4-2)	None	ESPN+	351	16–8	3–2
Mar. 20	at Georgia Southern	No. 23	Eagle Field at GS Softball Complex • Statesboro, GA	**W** 12–1^{6}	**Landry** (7-2)	Waldrep (3-3)	None	ESPN+	351	17–8	4–2
Mar. 25	UT Arlington		Yvette Girouard Field at Lamson Park • Lafayette, LA	**W** 9–1^{6}	**Landry** (8-2)	Adams (7-8)	None	ESPN+	1,854	18–8	5–2
Mar. 26	UT Arlington		Yvette Girouard Field at Lamson Park • Lafayette, LA	**W** 10–0^{5}	**Lamb** (6-4)	Bumpurs (4-4)	None		1,893	19–8	6–2
Mar. 27	UT Arlington		Yvette Girouard Field at Lamson Park • Lafayette, LA	**W** 10–0^{5}	**Landry** (9-2)	Adams (7-9)	None	ESPN+	1,739	20–8	7–2
Mar. 30	at No. 21 Texas		Red and Charline McCombs Field • Austin, TX	**W** 6–5^{8}	**Schorman** (5-2)	Dolcini (11-4)	None	LHN	1,123	21–8	

April (17–3)
Date	Opponent	Rank	Site/stadium	Score	Win	Loss	Save	TV	Attendance	Overall record	SBC record
Apr. 1	at Texas State		Bobcat Softball Stadium • San Marcos, TX	**W** 1–0	**Landry** (10-2)	Mullins (12-10)	**Schorman** (2)	ESPN+	562	22–8	8–2
Apr. 2	at Texas State		Bobcat Softball Stadium • San Marcos, TX	**W** 10–1^{5}	**Schorman** (6-2)	Pierce (4-3)	None	ESPN+	575	23–8	9–2
Apr. 3	at Texas State		Bobcat Softball Stadium • San Marcos, TX	**L** 4–5	Mullins (13-10)	**Schorman** (6-3)	None	ESPN+	547	23–9	9–3
Apr. 6	at McNeese State		Joe Miller Field at Cowgirl Diamond • Lake Charles, LA	**L** 5–6^{13}	Tate (6-7)	**Schorman** (6-4)	None	ESPN+	560	23–10	
Apr. 8	Troy		Yvette Girouard Field at Lamson Park • Lafayette, LA	**W** 7–1	**Landry** (11-2)	Johnson (14-6)	None	ESPN+	1,583	24–10	10–3
Apr. 9	Troy		Yvette Girouard Field at Lamson Park • Lafayette, LA	**W** 7–1	**Lamb** (7-4)	Johnson (14-7)	None	ESPN+	1,608	25–10	11–3
Apr. 10	Troy		Yvette Girouard Field at Lamson Park • Lafayette, LA	**W** 10–0^{6}	**Landry** (12-2)	Baker (6-4)	None	ESPN+	1,596	26–10	12–3
Apr. 12	at Southeastern Louisiana		North Oak Park • Hammond, LA	Game cancelled							
Apr. 14	at South Alabama		Jaguar Field • Mobile, AL	**W** 10–7	**Schorman** (7-4)	Lackie (9-5)	**Landry** (1)	ESPN+	302	27–10	13–3
Apr. 15	at South Alabama		Jaguar Field • Mobile, AL	**W** 7–1	**Lamb** (8-4)	Hardy (6-8)	None	ESPN+	504	28–10	14–3
Apr. 15	at South Alabama		Jaguar Field • Mobile, AL	**W** 2–1	**Landry** (13-2)	Lackie (9-6)	None	ESPN+	504	29–10	15–3
Apr. 18	at Saint Louis		Billiken Sports Center • St. Louis, MO	**W** 19–0^{5}	**Schorman** (8-4)	Wendling (12-11)	None		250	30–10	
Apr. 19	at Illinois		Eichelberger Field • Champaign, IL	**W** 4–2^{8}	**Schorman** (9-4)	Wiles (5-3)	None	B1G+	200	31–10	
Apr. 19	at Indiana		Andy Mohr Field • Bloomington, IN	**W** 11–2^{6}	**Landry** (14-2)	Montgomery (10-6)	None	B1G+	511	32–10	
Apr. 20	at Appalachian State		Sywassink/Lloyd Family Stadium • Boone, NC	**L** 1–4	Buckner (11-8)	**Landry** (14-3)	None	ESPN+	205	32–11	15–4
Apr. 21	at Appalachian State		Sywassink/Lloyd Family Stadium • Boone, NC	**W** 8–2	**Schorman** (10-4)	Neas (6-3)	None	ESPN+	311	33–11	16–4
Apr. 22	at Appalachian State		Sywassink/Lloyd Family Stadium • Boone, NC	**W** 10–1	**Landry** (15-3)	Nichols (4-4)	None	ESPN+	229	34–11	17–4
Apr. 27	Houston		Yvette Girouard Field at Lamson Park • Lafayette, LA	**W** 5–1	**Schorman** (11-4)	Wilkey (8-9)	None	ESPN+	1,556	35–11	
Apr. 29	Coastal Carolina		Yvette Girouard Field at Lamson Park • Lafayette, LA	**W** 6–0	**Lamb** (9-4)	Beasley-Polko (10-8)	None	ESPN+	1,655	36–11	18–4
Apr. 30	Coastal Carolina		Yvette Girouard Field at Lamson Park • Lafayette, LA	**W** 6–3	**Schorman** (12–4)	Volpe (2-5)	None	ESPN+	1,832	37–11	19–4
Apr. 30	Coastal Carolina		Yvette Girouard Field at Lamson Park • Lafayette, LA	**W** 7–3	**Landry** (16-3)	Beasley-Polko (10-9)	None	ESPN+	1,832	38–11	20–4

May (3–0)
Date	Opponent	Rank	Site/stadium	Score	Win	Loss	Save	TV	Attendance	Overall record	SBC record
May 6	at Louisiana–Monroe		Geo-Surfaces Field at the ULM Softball Complex • Monroe, LA	**W** 14–1^{5}	**Landry** (17-3)	Kackley (9-9)	None		455	39–11	21–4
May 7	at Louisiana–Monroe		Geo-Surfaces Field at the ULM Softball Complex • Monroe, LA	**W** 10–3	**Schorman** (13-4)	Abrams (7-8)	None		585	40–11	22–4
May 7	at Louisiana–Monroe		Geo-Surfaces Field at the ULM Softball Complex • Monroe, LA	**W** 10–3	**Landry** (18-3)	Abrams (7-9)	None		585	41–11	23–4

Postseason (6–2)

SBC Tournament (4–0)
Date	Opponent	(Seed)/Rank	Site/stadium	Score	Win	Loss	Save	TV	Attendance	Overall record	Tournament record
May 11	vs. (9) Coastal Carolina	(1)/No. 25	Jaguar Field • Mobile, AL	**W** 4–2	**Schorman** (14-4)	Beasley-Polko (13-10)	None	ESPN+	78	42–11	1–0
May 12	vs. (4) Troy	(1)/No. 25	Jaguar Field • Mobile, AL	**W** 9–1^{5}	**Landry** (19-3)	Johnson (20-12)	None	ESPN+	185	43–11	2–0
May 13	vs. (3) Texas State	(1)/No. 25	Jaguar Field • Mobile, AL	**W** 1–0^{8}	**Schorman** (15-4)	Mullins (27-12)	None	ESPN+	184	44–11	3–0
May 14	vs. (3) Texas State	(1)/No. 25	Jaguar Field • Mobile, AL	**W** 7–1	**Landry** (20-3)	Mullins (27-13)	None	ESPN+	269	45–11	4–0

NCAA Division I softball tournament (2–2)
Date	Opponent	(Seed)/Rank	Site/stadium	Score	Win	Loss	Save	TV	Attendance	Overall record	Tournament record
Clemson Regionals
May 20	vs. (2)/No. 17 Auburn	(3)	McWhorter Stadium • Clemson, SC	**L** 3–4	Penta (24-9)	**Schorman** (15-5)	None	ESPN+	1,760	45–12	0–1
May 21	vs. (4) UNC Wilmington	(3)	McWhorter Stadium • Clemson, SC	**W** 3–1^{11}	**Schorman** (16-6)	Winstead (13-10)	None	ESPN+	1,760	46–12	1–1
May 21	vs. (2)/No. 17 Auburn	(3)	McWhorter Stadium • Clemson, SC	**W** 4–3	**Schorman** (17-6)	Dismukes (6-4)	None	ESPN+	1,760	47–12	2–1
May 22	vs. (1)/No. 14 Clemson	(3)	McWhorter Stadium • Clemson, SC	**L** 0–8^{5}	Thompson (15-3)	**Schorman** (17-6)	None	ESPN+	1,760	47–13	2–2

Schedule source:

*Rankings are based on the team's current ranking in the NFCA/USA Softball poll.

== Clemson Regional ==
Clemson Regional Teams
(1) Clemson Tigers	(2) Auburn Tigers	(3) Louisiana Ragin' Cajuns	(4) UNC Wilmington Seahawks

First Round
10	Clemson	9
UNC Wilmington	0
Auburn	4
Louisiana	3
Lower round 1
Louisiana	3
UNC Wilmington	1

Semi-Finals
Auburn	0
10	Clemson	1
Lower final
Auburn	3
Louisiana	4

Finals
10	Clemson	8	-
Louisiana	0	-

== Rankings ==
Ranking movements Legend: ██ Increase in ranking ██ Decrease in ranking — = Not ranked RV = Received votes
	Week															
Poll	Pre	1	2	3	4	5	6	7	8	9	10	11	12	13	14	Final
NFCA / USA Today	23	20	20	21	22	23	RV	RV	RV	RV	RV	RV	RV	25	RV	
Softball America	19	15	15	20	—	—	—	—	—	—	—	—	22	22	23	
ESPN.com/USA Softball	23	20	20	22	25	—	—	RV	RV	RV	RV	RV	RV	RV	RV	
D1Softball	22	18	21	21	—	—	—	—	—	—	—	—	23	22	23	
