= 2022 Clemson Tigers softball team =

American college softball season

2022 Clemson Tigers softball
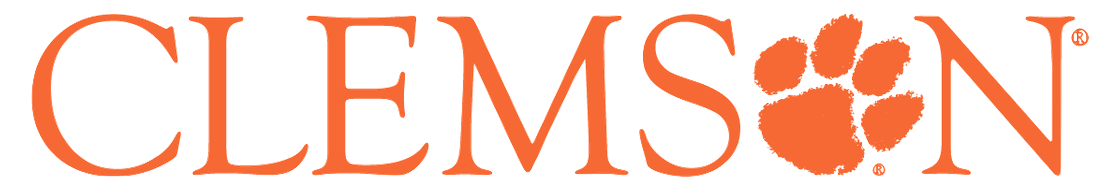

Clemson Classic Champions

NCAA tournament, Stillwater Super Regional
- Conference: Atlantic Coast Conference

Ranking
- Coaches: No. 16
- Record: 42–17 (14–10 ACC)
- Head coach: John Rittman (3rd season)
- Assistant coaches: Kyle Jamieson; Courtney Breault
- Home stadium: McWhorter Stadium

2022 Atlantic Coast Conference softball standings
	Conf.				Overall
Team	W		L	PCT	W		L	PCT
No. 10 Virginia Tech ‍†‍‍^{y}	21	–	2	.913	46	–	10	.821
No. 12 Duke ‍‍‍^{y}	19	–	3	.864	44	–	11	.800
No. 13 Florida State ‍‍‡‍^{y}	19	–	5	.792	54	–	7	.885
Notre Dame ‍‍‍^{y}	16	–	5	.762	40	–	12	.769
No. 16 Clemson ‍‍‍^{y}	14	–	10	.583	42	–	17	.712
Virginia ‍‍‍	13	–	11	.542	28	–	26	.519
Georgia Tech ‍‍‍	11	–	13	.458	38	–	18	.679
Louisville ‍‍‍	10	–	14	.417	27	–	25	.519
Syracuse ‍‍‍	7	–	15	.318	26	–	21	.553
NC State ‍‍‍	7	–	17	.292	33	–	23	.589
North Carolina ‍‍‍	6	–	18	.250	23	–	28	.451
Boston College ‍‍‍	6	–	18	.250	20	–	27	.426
Pittsburgh ‍‍‍	2	–	20	.091	14	–	27	.341
† – Conference champion ‡ – Tournament champion y – Invited to the NCAA tournament As of June 14, 2022; Rankings from NFCA

The 2022 Clemson Tigers softball team was the varsity college softball team that represented Clemson University during the 2022 NCAA Division I softball season. This was the third season of Clemson's softball program. The Tigers competed in the Atlantic Coast Conference (ACC) and were led by head coach John Rittman. Clemson played its home games at McWhorter Stadium in Clemson, South Carolina.

They finished the season 42–17 overall and 14–10 in ACC play to finish in fifth place. As the fifth seed in the ACC tournament, they earned a bye into the Quarter finals where they defeated fourth seed Notre Dame. In the Semifinals they defeated first seed Virginia Tech, but fell to third seed Florida State in the Final. This marked the back-to-back appearances in the Final of the ACC Tournament in the program's first two full seasons. The Tigers were selected, via at-large bid, as the tenth overall seed in the NCAA tournament. They hosted a regional and were placed into the Stillwater Super Regional. They defeated UNC Wilmington, Auburn, and Louisiana in their Regional to advance to face Oklahoma State in the Super Regional. Clemson lost both games in Stillwater to end their season.

The team was again led by Valerie Cagle, who finished the season with 16 wins, 13 home runs, and a .308 batting average. Cagle was named First Team All-ACC and to the NFCA All-American First Team. This marked her second year in a row as a First Team All-ACC player and Clemson's first First Team All-American. McKenzie Clark was named Second Team All-ACC, Alia Logoleo and Millie Thompson were named Third Team All-ACC and Aby Vieira was named to the All-Freshman Team.

== Previous season ==
The Tigers finished their first full season as a program 44–8 and 29–5 in ACC play to finish in first place and claim the regular season championship. As the first seed in the ACC tournament, they defeated Georgia Tech and Virginia Tech before losing to Duke in the Final. They earned an at-large bid to the NCAA tournament and were placed into the Tuscaloosa Regional. There they defeated Troy twice, but lost to Alabama twice to end their season.

== Personnel ==
=== Roster ===
2022 Clemson Tigers roster
Pitchers: 1 – Rachel Gibson – freshman; 10 – Emma Whitfield - (redshirt) Sophomore; 17 – Regan Spencer – sophomore; Utility: 2 – Brooke McCubbin (RHP/INF) – freshman; 4 – Aby Vieira (C/UTL) – freshman; 8 – Grace Hiller (INF/OF) – freshman; 9 – Sarah Howell (C/UTL) – sophomore; 11 – Haylee Whitesides (RHP/INF) – freshman; 12 – Cammy Pereira (INF/OF) - Graduate Student; 13 – Abi Stuart (C/UTL) - (redshirt) Sophomore; 15 – Madison May (INF/OF) - (redshirt) Sophomore; 16 – Alia Logoleo (INF/OF) - (redshirt) Sophomore; 19 – Jaden Cheek (INF/UTL) – sophomore; 24 – Arielle Oda (INF/OF) - (redshirt) Sophomore; 25 – Marissa Guimbarda (OF/UTL) - Graduate Student; 27 – Grace Mattimore (C/UTL) - Graduate Student; 72 – Valerie Cagle (RHP/UTL) - (redshirt) Sophomore; 87 – Millie Thompson (LHP/INF) - Sophomore	Catchers: 23 – JoJo Hyatt - (redshirt) Sophomore; Outfielders: 3 – Sam Russ - Graduate Student; 6 – Carlee Shannon - (redshirt) Sophomore; 7 – McKenzie Clark – sophomore; 42 – Morgan Johnson - (redshirt) Sophomore; Infielders: 5 – Ansley Houston – sophomore; 18 – Bailey Taylor - Graduate Student; 21 – Jadeyn Ruszkowski – freshman; 28 – Maddie Moore – freshman; 58 – Kyah Keller - (redshirt) Sophomore; 77 – Hannah Goodwin - (redshirt) Freshman

=== Coaches ===
2022 Clemson Tigers softball coaching staff
- John Rittman – Head coach – 3rd season
- Kyle Jamieson – Assistant coach – 3rd season
- Courtney Breault – Assistant coach – 3rd season
- Reese Jacobs – Volunteer assistant coach – 3rd season

== Schedule ==
Legend
	Clemson win
	Clemson loss
	Cancellation
**Bold**	Clemson team member
*	Non-Conference game
†	Make-Up Game

2022 Clemson Tigers softball game log
Regular season

February (11–3)
Date	Opponent	Rank	Site/stadium	Score	Win	Loss	Save	Attendance	Overall record	ACC record
Feb 10	at Florida Gulf Coast*	No. 15	FGCU Softball Complex • Fort Myers, FL (FGCU Kickoff Classic)	**W** 11–0 (5)	**Cagle** (1–0)	Oakes (0–1)	None	375	1–0	0–0
Feb 11	vs Kent State*	No. 15	FGCU Softball Complex • Fort Myers, FL (FGCU Kickoff Classic)	**W** 8–0 (5)	**Spencer** (1–0)	Lebeau (0–1)	None	0	2–0	0–0
Feb 11	vs No. 10 Texas*	No. 15	FGCU Softball Complex • Fort Myers, FL (FGCU Kickoff Classic)	**L** 0–4	Dolcini (1–0)	**Cagle** (1–1)	None	200	2–1	0–0
Feb 12	vs LIU*	No. 15	FGCU Softball Complex • Fort Myers, FL (FGCU Kickoff Classic)	**W** 8–0 (6)	**McCubbin** (1–0)	O'Donnell (0–2)	None	130	3–1	0–0
Feb 13	vs Boston College*	No. 15	FGCU Softball Complex • Fort Myers, FL (FGCU Kickoff Classic)	Canceled due to inclement weather					3–1	0–0
Feb 17	vs Texas Tech*	No. 15	Eddie C. Moore Complex • Clearwater, FL (St. Pete/Clearwater Elite Invitational)	**W** 8–0 (5)	**Cagle** (2–1)	Morgan (0–2)	None	330	4–1	0–0
Feb 18	vs No. 18 Tennessee*	No. 15	Eddie C. Moore Complex • Clearwater, FL (St. Pete/Clearwater Elite Invitational)	**W** 4–3	**Cagle** (3–1)	Edmoundson (3–1)	None	4,864	5–1	0–0
Feb 19	vs Northwestern*	No. 15	Eddie C. Moore Complex • Clearwater, FL (St. Pete/Clearwater Elite Invitational)	**L** 0–7	Williams (4–0)	**McCubbin** (1–1)	None	450	5–2	0–0
Feb 19	vs Wisconsin*	No. 15	Eddie C. Moore Complex • Clearwater, FL (St. Pete/Clearwater Elite Invitational)	**L** 1–2	Schwartz (4–1)	**Cagle** (3–2)	None	1,449	5–3	0–0
Feb 20	vs No. 6 Washington*	No. 15	Eddie C. Moore Complex • Clearwater, FL (St. Pete/Clearwater Elite Invitational)	**W** 2–0	**Cagle** (4–2)	Plain (4–1)	None	550	6–3	0–0
Feb 23	at Charlotte*	No. 14	Sue M. Daughtridge Stadium • Charlotte, NC	**W** 5–2	**Thompson** (1–0)	Walljasper (5–1)	**Cagle** (1)	450	7–3	0–0
Feb 25	Boston University*	No. 14	McWhorter Stadium • Clemson, SC (Clemson Classic)	**W** 8–0 (5)	**Cagle** (5–2)	Boaz (2–3)	None	1,616	8–3	0–0
Feb 25	Saint Francis (PA)*	No. 14	McWhorter Stadium • Clemson, SC (Clemson Classic)	**W** 2–0	**Spencer** (2–0)	Marsden (4–2)	None	1,616	9–3	0–0
Feb 26	Akron*	No. 14	McWhorter Stadium • Clemson, SC (Clemson Classic)	**W** 10–5	**McCubbin** (2–1)	Petrof (0–2)	**Cagle** (2)	1,616	10–3	0–0
Feb 26	Boston University*	No. 14	McWhorter Stadium • Clemson, SC (Clemson Classic)	**W** 7–3	**Thompson** (2–0)	Lizzy (3–4)	None	1,616	11–3	0–0

March (11–7)
Date	Opponent	Rank	Site/stadium	Score	Win	Loss	Save	Attendance	Overall record	ACC record
Mar 1	Gardner-Webb*	No. 14	McWhorter Stadium • Clemson, SC	**W** 6–0	**Spencer** (3–0)	Lyon (1–5)	None	1,616	12–3	0–0
Mar 4	No. 6 Virginia Tech	No. 14	McWhorter Stadium • Clemson, SC	**L** 1–6	Rochard (7–2)	**Cagle** (5–3)	None	1,616	12–4	0–1
Mar 5	No. 6 Virginia Tech	No. 14	McWhorter Stadium • Clemson, SC	**L** 0–4	Lemley (6–1)	**Thompson** (2–1)	None	1,616	12–5	0–2
Mar 6	No. 6 Virginia Tech	No. 14	McWhorter Stadium • Clemson, SC	**L** 2–4	Rochard (8–2)	**Cagle** (5–4)	Lemley (1)	1,616	12–6	0–3
Mar 9	Mercer*	No. 17	McWhorter Stadium • Clemson, SC	**W** 3–0	**Thompson** (3–1)	Pitts (1–8)	**McCubbin** (1)	1,616	13–6	0–3
Mar 12	Illinois*	No. 17	McWhorter Stadium • Clemson, SC	**W** 3–1	**Cagle** (6–4)	McQueen (2–2)	None	1,616	14–6	0–3
Mar 13	Illinois*	No. 17	McWhorter Stadium • Clemson, SC	**W** 4–0	**Thompson** (4–1)	Sickels (5–3)	None	1,616	15–6	0–3
Mar 13	Liberty*	No. 17	McWhorter Stadium • Clemson, SC	**W** 5–4 (8)	**McCubbin** (3–1)	Keeney (8–5)	None	1,616	16–6	0–3
Mar 14	Liberty*	No. 17	McWhorter Stadium • Clemson, SC	**W** 1–0 (8)	**Cagle** (7–4)	Kirby (1–3)	None	1,616	17–6	0–3
Mar 16	Winthrop*	No. 17	McWhorter Stadium • Clemson, SC	**W** 8–0 (5)	**McCubbin** (4–1)	Basinger (3–5)	None	1,616	18–6	0–3
Mar 18	at No. 13 Duke	No. 17	Duke Softball Stadium • Durham, NC	**L** 2–6	St. George (12–1)	**Cagle** (7–5)	None	585	18–7	0–4
Mar 19	at No. 13 Duke	No. 17	Duke Softball Stadium • Durham, NC	**W** 10–2 (5)	**Thompson** (5–1)	Wright (4–1)	None	534	19–7	1–4
Mar 20	at No. 13 Duke	No. 17	Duke Softball Stadium • Durham, NC	**L** 1–7	St. George (13–1)	**McCubbin** (4–2)	None	589	19–8	1–5
Mar 23	at No. 17 Georgia*	No. 16	Jack Turner Stadium • Athens, GA	**L** 2–3	Kerpics (10–1)	**Cagle** (7–6)	None	1,276	19–9	1–5
Mar 25	Louisville	No. 16	McWhorter Stadium • Clemson, SC	**W** 5–2	**Thompson** (6–1)	Harris (6–5)	None	1,616	20–9	2–5
Mar 26	Louisville	No. 16	McWhorter Stadium • Clemson, SC	**W** 8–0 (5)	**Cagle** (8–6)	Harris (6–6)	None	1,616	21–9	3–5
Mar 27	Louisville	No. 16	McWhorter Stadium • Clemson, SC	**L** 2–4 (8)	Roby (8–4)	**Cagle** (8–7)	None	1,616	21–10	3–6
Mar 30	South Carolina*	No. 18	McWhorter Stadium • Clemson, SC (Rivalry)	**W** 8–1	**Cagle** (9–7)	Betenbaugh (4–4)	None	1,616	22–10	3–6

April/May (15–4)
Date	Opponent	Rank	Site/stadium	Score	Win	Loss	Save	Attendance	Overall record	ACC record
Apr 1	at North Carolina	No. 18	Williams Field at Anderson Stadium • Chapel Hill, NC	**W** 12–4	**Cagle** (10–7)	Backes (6–10)	None	266	23–10	4–6
Apr 2	at North Carolina	No. 18	Williams Field at Anderson Stadium • Chapel Hill, NC	**W** 7–0	**Thompson** (7–1)	George (10–3)	None	417	24–10	5–6
Apr 3	at North Carolina	No. 18	Williams Field at Anderson Stadium • Chapel Hill, NC	**W** 12–4 (5)	**Spencer** (4–0)	Backes (6–11)	**McCubbin** (2)	496	25–10	6–6
Apr 6	Furman*	No. 18	McWhorter Stadium • Clemson, SC	**W** 3–2	**Cagle** (11–7)	Tufts (5–9)	None	1,616	26–10	6–6
Apr 6	Furman*	No. 18	McWhorter Stadium • Clemson, SC	**W** 8–0 (5)	**Thompson** (8–1)	Scott (3–7)	None	1,616	27–10	6–6
Apr 8	at Pittsburgh*	No. 18	Petersen Sports Complex • Pittsburgh, PA	**W** 8–0	**Cagle** (12–7)	Muraskin (4–8)	None	497	28–10	7–6
Apr 9	at Pittsburgh*	No. 18	Petersen Sports Complex • Pittsburgh, PA	**W** 8–6	**Spencer** (5–0)	Drogemull (8–8)	None	618	29–10	8–6
Apr 10	at Pittsburgh*	No. 18	Petersen Sports Complex • Pittsburgh, PA	**W** 11–3 (5)	**McCubbin** (5–2)	Muraskin (4–9)	None	795	30–10	9–6
Apr 12	at South Carolina*	No. 16	Beckham Field • Columbia, SC (Rivalry)	**W** 3–1	**Thompson** (9–1)	Powell (5–4)	**Cagle** (3)	1,780	31–10	9–6
Apr 14	No. 23 Notre Dame	No. 16	McWhorter Stadium • Clemson, SC	**W** 3–2	**Cagle** (13–7)	Tidd (12–4)	None	1,616	32–10	10–6
Apr 15	No. 23 Notre Dame	No. 16	McWhorter Stadium • Clemson, SC	**L** 0–4	Holloway (11–2)	**Thompson** (9–2)	None	1,616	32–11	10–7
Apr 16	No. 23 Notre Dame	No. 16	McWhorter Stadium • Clemson, SC	**W** 2–1	**Spencer** (6–0)	Becker (8–3)	None	1,616	33–11	11–7
Apr 21	at No. 5 Florida State	No. 17	JoAnne Graf Field at the Seminole Softball Complex • Tallahassee, FL	**L** 4–5	Watson (13–4)	**Spencer** (6–1)	None	973	33–12	11–8
Apr 22	at No. 5 Florida State	No. 17	JoAnne Graf Field at the Seminole Softball Complex • Tallahassee, FL	**L** 6–7	Watson (14–4)	**Thompson** (9–3)	Sandercock (3)	1,285	33–13	11–9
Apr 23	at No. 5 Florida State	No. 17	JoAnne Graf Field at the Seminole Softball Complex • Tallahassee, FL	**L** 0–6	Sandercock (23–1)	**Spencer** (6–2)	None	1,573	33–14	11–10
Apr 27	East Tennessee State*	No. 18	McWhorter Stadium • Clemson, SC	**W** 6–2	**Thompson** (10–3)	Farr (4–15)	None	1,616	34–14	11–10
Apr 29	Georgia Tech	No. 18	McWhorter Stadium • Clemson, SC	**W** 4–1	**Thompson** (11–3)	Dennis (16–5)	None	1,616	35–14	12–10
Apr 30	Georgia Tech	No. 18	McWhorter Stadium • Clemson, SC	**W** 3–0	**Cagle** (14–7)	Neleman (13–7)	None	1,616	36–14	13–10
May 1	Georgia Tech	No. 18	McWhorter Stadium • Clemson, SC	**W** 3–2 (8)	**Thompson** (12–3)	Neleman (13–8)	None	1,616	37–14	14–10

Postseason

ACC tournament (2–1)
Date	Seed	Rank	Opponent	Opponent Seed	Site/stadium	Score	Win	Loss	Save	Attendance	Overall record	Tournament record
May 12	5	No. 15	vs. No. 19 Notre Dame	4	Petersen Sports Complex • Pittsburgh, PA	**W** 7–3	**Thompson** (13–3)	Holloway (14–3)	None	546	38–14	1–0
May 13	5	No. 15	vs. No. 2 Virginia Tech	1	Petersen Sports Complex • Pittsburgh, PA	**W** 4–1	**Cagle** (15–7)	Lemley (15–6)	None	667	39–14	2–0
May 14	5	No. 15	vs. No. 3 Florida State	3	Petersen Sports Complex • Pittsburgh, PA	**L** 6–8	Sandercock (29–1)	**Cagle** (15–8)	None	667	39–15	2–1

NCAA Clemson Regional (3–0)
Date	Opponent Seed	Opponent	Seed	Rank	Site/stadium	Score	Win	Loss	Save	Attendance	Overall record	NCAA Clemson Regional Record
May 20	4	UNC Wilimington	1	No. 14	McWhorter Stadium • Clemson, SC	**W** 9–0 (5)	**Thompson** (14–3)	Winstead (13–9)	None	1,760	40–15	1–0
May 21	2	No. 17 Auburn	1	No. 14	McWhorter Stadium • Clemson, SC	**W** 1–0	**Cagle** (16–8)	Penta (24–10)	None	1,760	41–15	2–0
May 22	3	Louisiana	1	No. 14	McWhorter Stadium • Clemson, SC	**W** 8–0 (5)	**Thompson** (15–3)	Schorman (17–6)	None	1,760	42–15	3–0

NCAA Stillwater Super Regional (0–2)
Date	Opponent Seed	Opponent	Seed	Rank	Site/stadium	Score	Win	Loss	Save	Attendance	Overall record	NCAA Stillwater Super Regional Record
May 26	7	No. 6 Oklahoma State	10	No. 14	Cowgirl Stadium • Stillwater, OK	**L** 0–2	Maxwell (19–4)	**Thompson** (15–4)	None	1,068	42–16	0–1
May 27	7	No. 6 Oklahoma State	10	No. 14	Stillwater, OK	**L** 1–5	Day (13–4)	**Cagle** (16–9)	Maxwell (3)	1,384	42–17	0–2

Note: All rankings shown are from the NFCA/USA Today poll.

== Rankings ==
Ranking movements Legend: ██ Increase in ranking ██ Decrease in ranking т = Tied with team above or below
	Week																
Poll	Pre	1	2	3	4	5	6	7	8	9	10	11	12	13	14	15	Final
NFCA / USA Today	15	15	14	14	17	17	16	18	18	16	17	18	18	15	14	14*	16
Softball America	14	14	12	11	17	19	21	21	19	14	14	18	17	16	10	8	12
ESPN.com/USA Softball	14	12	9	9	15	15	15	16	17т	16	17	17	17	15	13	13*	14
D1Softball	14	13	13	13	17	18	19	19	19	17	17	18	16	16	16*	16*	15

- Various polls did not release during the NCAA tournament. * indicates that the ranking is from pre-tournament for comparison purposes.
