= Hope Trautwein-Valdespino =

American softball player

Current position
- Title: Pitching coach
- Team: McNeese
- Conference: Southland

Biographical details
- Born: August 26, 1999 (age 27); Pflugerville, Texas, U.S.
- Education: Oklahoma

Playing career
- 2018–2021: North Texas
- 2022: Oklahoma
- 2025–present: Blaze
- Position: Pitcher

Coaching career (HC unless noted)
- 2023: Oklahoma (Graduate asst.)
- 2024–2025: Houston (Asst.)
- 2025–present: McNeese (Asst.)

Accomplishments and honors

Awards
- Women's College World Series champion (2022); WCWS All-Tournament Team (2022); Conference USA Pitcher of the Year (2021); First team All-Big 12 (2022); 2× All-Conference USA First Team (2019, 2021); All-Conference USA Second Team (2018); Conference USA All-Freshman Team (2018)

Hope Trautwein-Valdespino (born August 26, 1999) is an American professional softball pitcher for the Blaze of the Athletes Unlimited Softball League (AUSL). She previously played college softball for Oklahoma and North Texas, where she pitched the first perfect game in NCAA Division I history in which every out was a strikeout.

== High school career ==
Trautwein attended Hendrickson High School in Pflugerville, Texas. As a senior, she led Hendrickson to a 27–3 record and a trip to the regional quarterfinals of the 2017 6A State Championship. She was subsequently named District 13-6A Pitcher of the Year in 2017.

== College career ==
Trautwein began her collegiate career at North Texas in 2018. She made her collegiate debut on February 9, 2018, where she recorded five strikeouts in 4 2/3 innings allowing two runs in the win. During her freshman year she appeared in 41 games, including 29 starts, and posted a 15–12 record, with a 2.48 ERA and 168 strikeouts in 183 2/3 innings. She ranked third in Conference USA in strikeouts and batters struck out looking and fourth in the conference in wins and innings pitched. On April 7, 2018, she pitched her first career no-hitter, and the first in program history since Ashley Kirk on April 29, 2013. Following the season she was named to the All-Conference USA Second Team and Conference USA All-Freshman Team.

During her sophomore year in 2019, she appeared in 44 games, including 28 starts, and posted a 22–7 record, with a 2.82 ERA and 169 strikeouts in a career-high 204 1/3 innings. She led the team in wins, ERA, strikeouts, and held opponents to a team-best .187 batting average while pitching a career-high 17 complete games. On April 3, 2019, she pitched her second career no-hitter in a game against Sam Houston State. Following the season she was named to the All-Conference USA First Team.

During her junior year in 2020, she appeared in 15 games, including 11 starts, and posted an 11–1 record, with a 1.64 ERA and 121 strikeouts in 81 innings, in a season that was cancelled due to the COVID-19 pandemic. On February 21, 2020, she set the single game program and Conference USA records with 21 strikeouts in a game against Texas A&M–Corpus Christi. She became just the third pitcher in Division I history to strike out 21 hitters in a seven-inning game. She was subsequently named the Conference USA Co-Pitcher of the Week for the week ending February 24, 2020.

During her senior year in 2021, she appeared in a team-high 30 games, including 21 starts, and posted an 13–4 record, with a 1.46 ERA and 235 strikeouts in 129 2/3 innings. She set the single-season program records for ERA (1.46), strikeouts (235), opponent batting average (.172), strikeouts per seven innings (12.73) and saves (7). During conference play, she posted a 7-0 record with a 1.04 ERA and 110 strikeouts.

On April 11, 2021, in a game against Arkansas–Pine Bluff, she made NCAA Division I history when she pitched the first perfect game in which she registered all 21 outs by strikeout. This was the first perfect game in North Texas program history, and the second in Conference USA history. She struck out 17 batters swinging, including the first 10 batters she faced, and four looking. Following an outstanding season she was named to the All-Conference USA First Team and Conference USA Pitcher of the Year.

On June 18, 2021, Trautwein announced she would transfer to Oklahoma. She finished her career at North Texas as the program leader in ERA (2.05), wins (61), saves (15), opponent batting average (.197) and strikeouts per seven innings (8.11). She also ranks second in strikeouts (693), fourth in complete games (40), and fifth in starts (68) and innings pitched (469.0).

Trautwein made her debut for Oklahoma on February 10, 2022, in a game against UC Santa Barbara. She struck out three batters she faced in two innings. Sophomore Nicole May and freshman Jordy Bahl combined to finish the perfect game for the Sooners. On May 27, 2022, she pitched her fourth career no-hitter in an 8–0 run-rule victory over UCF. During her redshirt senior in 2022 she posted a 16–0 record, with 135 strikeouts in 88 innings pitched, and led the nation with a 0.16 ERA during the regular season. Following an outstanding season she was named a first-team All-Big 12 selection.

== Professional career ==
On May 13, 2025, Trautwein was added to the AUSL Blaze's roster from the reserve pool. She pitched eight innings across four games (starting one), finishing the season with an 0-1 record, 7 strikeouts, and a 9.63 ERA.

== Coaching career ==
Following the conclusion of her collegiate career, Trautwein announced she would stay at Oklahoma as a graduate assistant coach in 2023.

On July 3, 2023, Trautwein was named an assistant coach for the Houston Cougars softball program.

On June 20, 2025, Trautwein was named the pitching coach for the McNeese Cowgirls softball program.

== Personal life ==
Trautwein married Dom Valdespino in December 2023.
