= 2022 NCAA Division I softball tournament =

College softball tournament

- Teams: 64
- Finals site: USA Softball Hall of Fame Stadium; Oklahoma City
- Champions: Oklahoma (6th title)
- Runner-up: Texas (6th WCWS Appearance)
- Winning coach: Patty Gasso (6th title)
- MOP: Jocelyn Alo (Oklahoma)
- Television: ABC; ESPN; ESPN2; ESPNU; ACCN; SECN; LHN; ESPN+

The 2022 NCAA Division I softball tournament was held from May 20 through June 9, 2022, as the final part of the 2022 NCAA Division I softball season. The tournament culminated with the 2022 Women's College World Series at USA Softball Hall of Fame Stadium in Oklahoma City.

== Format ==
A total of 64 teams entered the tournament, with 32 of them receiving an automatic bid by either winning their conference's tournament or by finishing in first place in their conference. The remaining 32 bids were issued at-large, with selections extended by the NCAA Selection Committee.

== Bids ==
The Big West, Mountain West, Pac-12 and West Coast Conference bids were awarded to the regular-season champion. All other conferences had their automatic bid go to the conference tournament winner.

=== Automatic ===
Conference	School	Best finish	Last NCAA appearance
America East	UMBC	Regionals (2002, 2019, 2021)	2021
American	UCF	Regionals (2005, 2008, 2010, 2012, 2014, 2015, 2016, 2021)	2021
ACC	Florida State	National Champion (2018)	2021
Atlantic 10	Fordham	Regionals (2010, 2011, 2013, 2014, 2015, 2016, 2017, 2018, 2019)	2019
ASUN	Liberty	Regionals (2002, 2011, 2018, 2021)	2021
Big 12	Oklahoma State	Third Place (1989, 1990, 1994, 1998)	2021
Big East	Villanova	Regionals (2021)	2021
Big Sky	Weber State	Regionals (2015, 2016, 2019)	2019
Big South	Campbell	Regionals (1995, 2008, 2009, 2021)	2021
Big Ten	Nebraska	Third Place (1984, 1987)	2016
Big West	Cal State Fullerton	National Champion (1986)	2019
CAA	UNC Wilmington	First appearance	First appearance
Conference USA	North Texas	First appearance	First appearance
Horizon	Oakland	Regionals (2002, 2003, 2015)	2015
Ivy League	Princeton	Women's College World Series (1995, 1996)	2017
MAC	Miami (OH)	Regionals (2005, 2009, 2012, 2016, 2021)	2021
MAAC	Canisius	Regionals (1994, 2000, 2002, 2004, 2005, 2007, 2008, 2009)	2009
MEAC	Howard	Regionals (2007)	2007
MVC	Missouri State	National Champion (1974)	2011
Mountain West	San Diego State	Regionals (2001, 2003, 2006, 2008, 2009, 2010, 2011, 2012, 2013, 2014, 2015)	2015
Northeast	Saint Francis (PA)	Regionals (2017, 2018, 2019, 2021)	2021
OVC	Murray State	First appearance	First appearance
Pac-12	Arizona State	National Champion (1972, 1973, 2008, 2011)	2019
Patriot	Lehigh	Regionals (2001, 2004, 2005, 2006, 2008, 2009, 2011, 2012, 2015, 2017)	2017
SEC	Arkansas	Super Regionals (2018, 2021)	2021
SoCon	Chattanooga	Regionals (2000, 2001, 2002, 2003, 2004, 2008, 2009, 2011, 2014, 2015, 2019)	2019
Southland	McNeese State	Regionals (1994, 2005, 2010, 2016, 2017, 2018, 2021)	2021
SWAC	Prairie View A&M	Regionals (2018)	2018
Summit League	South Dakota State	Regionals (2021)	2021
Sun Belt	Louisiana	Third Place (1993)	2021
WAC	Grand Canyon	First appearance	First appearance
WCC	Loyola Marymount	Regionals (2005, 2007)	2007

=== At-large ===
Team	Conference
Alabama	SEC
Arizona	Pac-12
Auburn	SEC
Clemson	ACC
Duke	ACC
Florida	SEC
Georgia	SEC
Georgia Tech	ACC
Illinois	Big Ten
Kentucky	SEC
LSU	SEC
Michigan	Big Ten
Minnesota	Big Ten
Mississippi State	SEC
Missouri	SEC
Northwestern	Big Ten
Notre Dame	ACC
Ohio State	Big Ten
Oklahoma	Big 12
Ole Miss	SEC
Oregon	Pac-12
Oregon State	Pac-12
South Florida	American
Stanford	Pac-12
Tennessee	SEC
Texas	Big 12
Texas A&M	SEC
UCLA	Pac-12
Virginia Tech	ACC
Washington	Pac-12
Wichita State	American
Wisconsin	Big Ten

=== By conference ===
Conference	Total	Schools
SEC	12	Alabama, Arkansas, Auburn, Florida, Georgia, Kentucky, LSU, Mississippi State, Missouri, Ole Miss, Tennessee, Texas A&M
Big Ten	7	Illinois, Michigan, Minnesota, Nebraska, Northwestern, Ohio State, Wisconsin
Pac-12	7	Arizona, Arizona State, Oregon, Oregon State, Stanford, UCLA, Washington
ACC	6	Clemson, Duke, Florida State, Georgia Tech, Notre Dame, Virginia Tech
American	3	South Florida, UCF, Wichita State
Big 12	3	Oklahoma, Oklahoma State, Texas
ASUN	1	Liberty
America East	1	UMBC
Atlantic 10	1	Fordham
Big East	1	Villanova
Big Sky	1	Weber State
Big South	1	Campbell
Big West	1	Cal State Fullerton
Colonial	1	UNC Wilmington
Conference USA	1	North Texas
Horizon	1	Oakland
Ivy League	1	Princeton
MAAC	1	Canisius
Mid-American	1	Miami (OH)
Mid-Eastern	1	Howard
Missouri Valley	1	Missouri State
Mountain West	1	San Diego State
Northeast	1	Saint Francis (PA)
Ohio Valley	1	Murray State
Patriot	1	Lehigh
SoCon	1	Chattanooga
Southland	1	McNeese State
Southwestern	1	Prairie View A&M
Summit	1	South Dakota State
Sun Belt	1	Louisiana
WAC	1	Grand Canyon
West Coast	1	Loyola Marymount

== National seeds ==
16 National Seeds were announced on the Selection Show, on Sunday, May 15 at 7 p.m. EDT on ESPN2. Teams in italics advanced to Super Regionals. Teams in bold advanced to the Women's College World Series.

1. **Oklahoma**
2. Florida State
3. Virginia Tech
4. Arkansas
5. **UCLA**
6. Alabama
7. **Oklahoma State**
8. Arizona State

9. **Northwestern**
10. Clemson
11. Tennessee
12. Duke
13. Washington
14. **Florida**
15. Missouri
16. UCF

== Regionals and Super Regionals ==
The Regionals took place May 20–22. The Super Regionals took place May 26–29.

=== Norman Super Regional ===
Round 1	Round 2
1	**Oklahoma**	**14**^{(5)}
Prairie View A&M	0
1	**Oklahoma**	**3**
Texas A&M	2
Minnesota	1
**Texas A&M**	**5**
Norman Regional – OU Softball Complex
Prairie View A&M	1
**Minnesota**	**13**^{(5)}
**Texas A&M**	**10**
Minnesota	7
16	**UCF**	**6**
Villanova	0
16	**UCF**	**3**^{(11)}
Michigan	2
South Dakota State	1
**Michigan**	**2**
Orlando Regional – UCF Softball Complex
Villanova	4
**South Dakota State**	**5**^{(9)}
**Michigan**	**4**
South Dakota State	1

Regional Finals
1	**Oklahoma**	**20**^{(5)}	—
Texas A&M	0	—
16	**UCF**	**9**	—
Michigan	4	—

Super Regionals
1	**Oklahoma**	**8**^{(5)}	**7**	—
16	UCF	0	1	—

=== Tempe Super Regional ===
Round 1	Round 2
8	**Arizona State**	**5**
Cal State Fullerton	2
8	**Arizona State**	**11**
San Diego State	8
**San Diego State**	**10**
LSU	5
Tempe Regional – Alberta B. Farrington Softball Stadium
**Cal State Fullerton**	**3**
LSU	2
**San Diego State**	**8**
Cal State Fullerton	5
9	**Northwestern**	**9**
Oakland	2
9	**Northwestern**	**17**^{(5)}
McNeese State	3
**McNeese State**	**11**^{(5)}
Notre Dame	1
Evanston Regional – Sharon J. Drysdale Field
**Notre Dame**	**16**^{(5)}
Oakland	1
**McNeese State**	**3**
Notre Dame	1

Regional Finals
8	**Arizona State**	**8**	—
San Diego State	4	—
9	**Northwestern**	**10**^{(5)}	—
McNeese State	2	—

Super Regionals
8	Arizona State	3	**7**^{(8)}	6
9	**Northwestern**	**4**^{(11)}	4	**8**

=== Los Angeles Super Regional ===
Round 1	Round 2
5	**UCLA**	**12**^{(5)}
Grand Canyon	1
5	**UCLA**	**7**
Loyola Marymount	1
**Loyola Marymount**	**4**
Ole Miss	2
Los Angeles Regional – Easton Stadium
Grand Canyon	5
**Ole Miss**	**9**
Loyola Marymount	2
**Ole Miss**	**4**
12	**Duke**	**4**
UMBC	0
12	**Duke**	**5**
Liberty	0
**Liberty**	**2**
Georgia	0
Durham Regional – Duke Softball Stadium
UMBC	3
**Georgia**	**6**
Liberty	2
**Georgia**	**7**

Regional Finals
5	**UCLA**	**9**^{(5)}	—
Ole Miss	1	—
12	**Duke**	3	**13**^{(6)}
Georgia	**5**	5

Super Regionals
5	**UCLA**	**3**	**8**	—
12	Duke	2	2	—

=== Fayetteville Super Regional ===
Round 1	Round 2
4	**Arkansas**	**11**^{(5)}
Princeton	0
4	**Arkansas**	**6**
Oregon	2
Wichita State	2
**Oregon**	**10**^{(5)}
Fayetteville Regional – Bogle Park
Princeton	4
**Wichita State**	**5**
**Oregon**	**8**
Wichita State	1
13	**Washington**	**9**
Lehigh	2
13	Washington	2
**Texas**	**8**
Weber State	0
**Texas**	**6**
Seattle Regional – Husky Softball Stadium
**Lehigh**	**5**
Weber State	4
13	**Washington**	**6**
Lehigh	1

Regional Finals
4	**Arkansas**	**9**	—
Oregon	3	—
**Texas**	1	**3**
13	Washington	**2**	2

Super Regionals
4	Arkansas	**7**	1	0
**Texas**	1	**3**	**3**

=== Blacksburg Super Regional ===
Round 1	Round 2
3	**Virginia Tech**	**4**
Saint Francis (PA)	0
3	Virginia Tech	4
**Kentucky**	**5**
Miami (OH)	1
**Kentucky**	**15**
Blacksburg Regional – Tech Softball Park
**Miami (OH)**	**4**
Saint Francis (PA)	0
3	**Virginia Tech**	**5**
Miami (OH)	4
14	**Florida**	**10**^{(5)}
Canisius	1
14	**Florida**	**7**
Georgia Tech	1
Wisconsin	1
**Georgia Tech**	**2**
Gainesville Regional – Katie Seashole Pressly Softball Stadium
Canisius	0
**Wisconsin**	3
Georgia Tech	6
**Wisconsin**	**7**

Regional Finals
Kentucky	2	4
3	**Virginia Tech**	**9**	**5**
14	**Florida**	**11**^{(5)}	—
Wisconsin	0	—

Super Regionals
3	Virginia Tech	**6**	2	0
14	**Florida**	0	**7**	**12**

=== Stanford Super Regional ===
Played at Boyd & Jill Smith Family Stadium in Stanford, California

Round 1	Round 2
6	**Alabama**	**3**
Chattanooga	0
6	Alabama	0
**Stanford**	**6**
Murray State	1
**Stanford**	**3**
Tuscaloosa Regional – Rhoads Stadium
**Chattanooga**	**1**^{(8)}
Murray State	0
6	**Alabama**	**6**
Chattanooga	2
11	**Tennessee**	**9**^{(6)}
Campbell	1
11	**Tennessee**	**3**
Oregon State	0
**Oregon State**	**4**
Ohio State	3
Knoxville Regional – Sherri Parker Lee Stadium
Campbell	0
**Ohio State**	**10**^{(6)}
**Oregon State**	**5**
Ohio State	1

Regional Finals
**Stanford**	0	**6**
6	Alabama	**4**	0
11	Tennessee	3	1
**Oregon State**	**8**	**3**

Super Regionals
Stanford	1	0	–
**Oregon State**	**3**	**2**	–

=== Stillwater Super Regional ===
Round 1	Round 2
7	**Oklahoma State**	**12**^{(5)}
Fordham	0
7	**Oklahoma State**	**7**
Nebraska	4
North Texas	0
**Nebraska**	**3**
Stillwater Regional – Cowgirl Stadium
Fordham	3
**North Texas**	**5**
Nebraska	0
**North Texas**	**3**
10	**Clemson**	**9**^{(5)}
UNC Wilmington	0
10	**Clemson**	**1**
Auburn	0
Louisiana	3
**Auburn**	**4**
Clemson Regional – McWhorter Stadium
UNC Wilmington	1
**Louisiana**	**3**^{(11)}
Auburn	3
**Louisiana**	**4**

Regional Finals
7	**Oklahoma State**	**2**	—
North Texas	0	—
10	**Clemson**	**8**	—
Louisiana	0	—

Super Regionals
7	**Oklahoma State**	**2**	**5**	—
10	Clemson	0	1	—

=== Starkville Super Regional ===
Played at Nusz Park in Starkville, Mississippi

Round 1	Round 2
2	**Florida State**	**8**^{(5)}
Howard	0
2	**Florida State**	**8**^{(5)}
South Florida	0
**South Florida**	**4**
Mississippi State	0
Tallahassee Regional – JoAnne Graf Field
Howard	3
**Mississippi State**	**6**
South Florida	0
**Mississippi State**	**6**
15	**Missouri**	**3**
Missouri State	1
15	Missouri	0
**Arizona**	**2**
**Arizona**	**8**
Illinois	3
Columbia Regional – Mizzou Softball Stadium
**Missouri State**	**2**
Illinois	0
15	**Missouri**	**2**
Missouri State	0

Regional Finals
2	Florida State	0	3
**Mississippi State**	**5**	**4**
**Arizona**	**1**	—
15	Missouri	0	—

Super Regionals
Mississippi State	2	1	—
**Arizona**	**3**^{(8)}	**7**	—

== Women's College World Series ==
The Women's College World Series was held June 2 through June 9 in Oklahoma City.

=== Participants ===
School	Conference	Record (conference)	Head coach	WCWS appearances† (including 2022 WCWS)	WCWS best finish†*	WCWS W–L record† (excluding 2022 WCWS)
Arizona	Pac-12	38–20 (8–16)	Caitlin Lowe	25 (last: 2021)	1st (1991, 1993, 1994, 1996; 1997, 2001, 2006, 2007)	62–36
Florida	SEC	48–17 (13–11)	Tim Walton	11 (last: 2019)	1st (2014, 2015)	26–18
Northwestern	Big Ten	45–11 (19–4)	Kate Drohan	6 (last: 2007)	2nd (2006)	14–11
Oklahoma	Big 12	57–3 (17–1)	Patty Gasso	15 (last: 2021)	1st (2000, 2013, 2016, 2017, 2021)	38–22
Oklahoma State	Big 12	46–12 (14–4)	Kenny Gajewski	10 (last: 2021)	3rd (1989, 1990, 1993, 1994, 2022)	13–18
Oregon State	Pac-12	39–20 (9–15)	Laura Berg	2 (last: 2006)	8th (2006)	0–2
Texas	Big 12	43–19–1 (12–6)	Mike White	6 (last: 2013)	3rd (2003, 2005, 2013)	7–10
UCLA	Pac-12	48–8 (19–5)	Kelly Inouye-Perez	31 (last: 2021)	1st (1982, 1984, 1985, 1988, 1989, 1990, 1992, 1999, 2003, 2004, 2010, 2019)	104–38

=== Bracket ===
First round
1	**Oklahoma**	**13**^{(5)}
9	Northwestern	2
5	UCLA	2
**Texas**	**7**
9	Northwestern	1
5	**UCLA**	**6**
14	**Florida**	**7**
Oregon State	1
7	**Oklahoma State**	**4**
Arizona	2
Oregon State	1
**Arizona**	**3**

Second round
1	**Oklahoma**	**7**
Texas	2
14	Florida	0
5	**UCLA**	**8**^{(6)}
14	Florida	0
7	**Oklahoma State**	**2**
**Texas**	**5**
Arizona	2

Semifinals
1	**Oklahoma**	3	**15**^{(5)}
5	UCLA	**7**	0
7	Oklahoma State	0	5
**Texas**	**5**	**6**

Finals
1	Oklahoma	**16**	**10**	—
Texas	1	5	—

=== Game results ===
Date	Game	Winning team	Score	Losing team	Winning pitcher	Losing pitcher	Save	Notes
June 2	Game 1	Texas	7–2	UCLA	Hailey Dolcini (23–10)	Megan Faraimo (22–5)	–	Boxscore
June 2	Game 2	Oklahoma	13–2 ^{(5)}	Northwestern	Hope Trautwein (19–1)	Danielle Williams (31–5)	–	Boxscore
June 2	Game 3	Florida	7–1	Oregon State	Natalie Lugo (12–5)	Sarah Haendiges (13–7)	–	Boxscore
June 2	Game 4	Oklahoma State	4–2	Arizona	Kelly Maxwell (19–4)	Hanah Bowen (13–11)	–	Boxscore
June 3	Game 5	UCLA	6–1	Northwestern	Megan Faraimo (23–5)	Danielle Williams (31–6)	–	Northwestern eliminated Boxscore
June 3	Game 6	Arizona	3–1	Oregon State	Hanah Bowen (14–11)	Mariah Mazon (17–12)	–	Oregon State eliminated Boxscore
June 4	Game 7	Oklahoma	7–2	Texas	Hope Trautwein (20–1)	Hailey Dolcini (23–11)	–	Boxscore
June 4	Game 8	Oklahoma State	2–0	Florida	Kelly Maxwell (20–4)	Lexie Delbrey (15–4)	–	Boxscore
June 5	Game 9	UCLA	8–0 ^{(6)}	Florida	Holly Azevedo (21–2)	Elizabeth Hightower (17–9)	–	Florida eliminated Boxscore
June 5	Game 10	Texas	5–2	Arizona	Estelle Czech (12–1)	Hanah Bowen (14–12)	–	Arizona eliminated Boxscore
June 6	Game 11	UCLA	7–3	Oklahoma	Megan Faraimo (24–5)	Nicole May (15–1)	Holly Azevedo (2)	Boxscore
June 6	Game 12	Oklahoma	15–0 ^{(5)}	UCLA	Hope Trautwein (21–1)	Holly Azevedo (21–3)	–	UCLA eliminated Boxscore
June 6	Game 13	Texas	5–0	Oklahoma State	Estelle Czech (13–1)	Morgan Day (13–5)	–	Boxscore
June 6	Game 14	Texas	6–5	Oklahoma State	Hailey Dolcini (24–11)	Kelly Maxwell (20–5)	–	Oklahoma State eliminated Texas: First unseeded team in WCWS history to advance to the finals Boxscore
Finals
June 8	Game 1	Oklahoma	16–1	Texas	Hope Trautwein (22–1)	Hailey Dolcini (24–12)	–	Oklahoma 1–0
June 9	Game 2	Oklahoma	10–5	Texas	Jordy Bahl (22–1)	Estelle Czech (13–2)	–	Oklahoma wins WCWS

=== Finals ===
June 8, 2022 – 7:30 p.m. (CDT) at USA Softball Hall of Fame Stadium in Oklahoma City, Oklahoma
Team	1	2	3	4	5	6	7	R	H	E
Texas	1	0	0	0	0	0	0	**1**	**3**	**4**
**Oklahoma**	5	1	4	2	2	2	x	**16**	**16**	**1**
WP: Hope Trautwein (22–1) LP: Hailey Dolcini (24–12); Home runs: TEX: None; OKLA: Jocelyn Alo, Tiare Jennings, Taylon Snow, Jana Johns; Attendance: 12,234; Boxscore

June 9, 2022 – 6:30 p.m. (CDT) at USA Softball Hall of Fame Stadium in Oklahoma City, Oklahoma
Team	1	2	3	4	5	6	7	R	H	E
**Oklahoma**	0	0	0	2	4	4	0	**10**	**13**	**0**
Texas	2	0	0	0	0	0	3	**5**	**6**	**2**
WP: Jordy Bahl (22–1) LP: Estelle Czech (13–2); Home runs: OKLA: Grace Lyons, Kinzie Hansen; TEX: Mia Scott; Attendance: 12,257; Boxscore

=== All-tournament Team ===
The following players were members of the Women's College World Series All-Tournament Team.

Position	Player	School
P	Estelle Czech	Texas
P	Megan Faraimo	UCLA
P	Kelly Maxwell	Oklahoma State
P	Hope Trautwein	Oklahoma
1B	Courtney Day	Texas
2B	Tiare Jennings	Oklahoma
OF	Rylie Boone	Oklahoma
OF	Bella Dayton	Texas
C	Delanie Wisz	UCLA
U	**Jocelyn Alo (MOP)**	Oklahoma
U	Maya Brady	UCLA
U	Jayda Coleman	Oklahoma

== Record by conference ==
Conference	# of Bids	Record	Win %	RF	SR	WS	NS	F	NC
Big 12	3	26–8	.765	3	3	3	3	2	1
Pac-12	7	32–16	.667	7	5	3	1	–	–
SEC	12	31–26	.544	10	3	1	–	–	–
Big Ten	7	11–13	.458	3	1	1	–	–	–
ACC	6	11–13	.458	4	3	–	–	–	–
American	3	5–6	.455	1	1	–	–	–	–
Conference USA	1	2–2	.500	1	–	–	–	–	–
Mountain West	1	2–2	.500	1	–	–	–	–	–
Sun Belt	1	2–2	.500	1	–	–	–	–	–
Southland	1	2–2	.500	1	–	–	–	–	–
ASUN	1	1–2	.333	–	–	–	–	–	–
Big West	1	1–2	.333	–	–	–	–	–	–
MAC	1	1–2	.333	–	–	–	–	–	–
Missouri Valley	1	1–2	.333	–	–	–	–	–	–
Patriot	1	1–2	.333	–	–	–	–	–	–
Southern	1	1–2	.333	–	–	–	–	–	–
Summit	1	1–2	.333	–	–	–	–	–	–
West Coast	1	1–2	.333	–	–	–	–	–	–
America East	1	0–2	.000	–	–	–	–	–	–
Atlantic 10	1	0–2	.000	–	–	–	–	–	–
Big East	1	0–2	.000	–	–	–	–	–	–
Big Sky	1	0–2	.000	–	–	–	–	–	–
Big South	1	0–2	.000	–	–	–	–	–	–
Colonial	1	0–2	.000	–	–	–	–	–	–
Horizon	1	0–2	.000	–	–	–	–	–	–
Ivy League	1	0–2	.000	–	–	–	–	–	–
Metro Atlantic	1	0–2	.000	–	–	–	–	–	–
Mid-Eastern	1	0–2	.000	–	–	–	–	–	–
Northeast	1	0–2	.000	–	–	–	–	–	–
Ohio Valley	1	0–2	.000	–	–	–	–	–	–
SWAC	1	0–2	.000	–	–	–	–	–	–
WAC	1	0–2	.000	–	–	–	–	–	–

== Media coverage ==
=== Radio ===
For the second consecutive year Westwood One provided nationwide radio coverage of every game in the Women's College World Series. Ryan Radtke and Leah Amico returned as two of the broadcasters. Chris Plank and Destinee Martinez worked select games, while Radtke and Amico called the Championship Series.

=== Television ===
ESPN held exclusive rights to the tournament. The network aired games across ABC, ESPN, ESPN2, ESPNU, ESPN+, SEC Network, Longhorn Network, and ACC Network. For just the fifth time in the history of the women's softball tournament, ESPN covered every regional.

==== Broadcast assignments ====
Regionals

- Norman: Tiffany Greene & Erin Miller
- Tallahassee: Mike Couzens & Kayla Braud
- Blacksburg: Pam Ward & Jenny Dalton-Hill
- Fayetteville: Eric Frede & Madison Shipman
- Los Angeles: Trey Bender & Kenzie Fowler
- Tuscaloosa: Alex Perlman & Francesca Enea
- Stillwater: Alex Loeb & Cat Osterman
- Tempe: Eric Collins & Michele Smith

Super Regionals

- Norman: Pam Ward & Jenny Dalton-Hill
- Blacksburg: Eric Frede, Madison Shipman & Jalyn Johnson
- Fayetteville: Beth Mowins, Jessica Mendoza, Michele Smith & Holly Rowe
- Los Angeles: Courtney Lyle & Danielle Lawrie

Women's College World Series

- Beth Mowins, Jessica Mendoza, Michele Smith & Holly Rowe (afternoons)
- Kevin Brown, Amanda Scarborough & Andraya Carter (evenings)

Regionals

- Evanston: Matt Schumacker & Jennie Ritter
- Clemson: Jenn Hildreth & Carol Bruggeman
- Knoxville: Courtney Lyle & Danielle Lawrie
- Durham: Clay Matvick & Brittany McKinney
- Seattle: Mark Neely & Amanda Scarborough
- Gainesville: Sam Gore & Sierra Romero
- Columbia: Angel Gray & Tori Vidales
- Orlando: Tyler Denning & Nicole Mendes

Super Regionals

- Stillwater: Kevin Brown, Amanda Scarborough & Andraya Carter
- Tempe: Mike Couzens & Kayla Braud
- Starkville: Tiffany Greene & Erin Miller
- Stanford: Mark Neely & Carol Bruggeman

Women's College World Series Finals

- Beth Mowins, Jessica Mendoza, Michele Smith & Holly Rowe
