= Southern Conference women's soccer tournament =

- Conference soccer championship
- Southern Conference logo
- Sport: Soccer
- Conference: Southern Conference
- Number of teams: 11
- Format: Single-elimination
- Current stadium: Campus sites
- Played: 1994–present
- Last contest: 2026
- Current champion: Samford (8th title)
- Most championships: Samford; UNC Greensboro (8 titles)
- TV partner(s): SoCon Network, ESPN+
- Official website: soconsports.com/wsoc

The Southern Conference women's soccer tournament is the conference championship tournament in women's college soccer for the Southern Conference. The tournament has been held every year since 1994. It is a single-elimination tournament with seeding based on conference records and the higher seeded team hosting all matches. The winner of the tournament receives the conference's automatic bid to the NCAA Division I women's soccer tournament.

== Champions ==
=== Key ===
Key

- (1) — Title number
- a.e.t. — Match went to extra time
- p – Match decided by a penalty shootout after extra time
- – Winning team also won regular season

=== By Year ===
Year	Champion	Score	Runner-up	Venue / city	MVP / MOP (Note: Award was "MVP" through 2007; "MOP" ("most outstanding player") starting in 2008.)	Ref.
1994	Davidson (1)	2–1	Georgia Southern	UNCG Soccer Stadium • Greensboro, NC	Shannon Lowrance, Davidson	
1995	Davidson (2)	3–0	Furman	Alumni Soccer Stadium • Davidson, NC	Claudia Lombard, Davidson	
1996	Davidson (3)	1–0	Georgia Southern	Alumni Soccer Stadium • Davidson, NC	Katherine Cornelius, Davidson	
1997	UNC Greensboro (1)	2–0	Wofford	Alumni Soccer Stadium • Davidson, NC	Kim Rosenberg, UNC Greensboro	
1998	UNC Greensboro (2)	2–0 (a.e.t.)	Furman	Eugene E. Stone III Stadium • Greenville, SC	Ali Lord, UNC Greensboro	
1999	Furman (1)	2–1 (a.e.t.)	Davidson	UNCG Soccer Stadium • Greensboro, NC	Kaye Brownlee, Furman	
2000	UNC Greensboro (3)	1–0	Furman	Patriots Point Soccer Complex • Mount Pleasant, SC	Lynsey McLean, UNC Greensboro	
2001	UNC Greensboro (4)	2–1 (a.e.t.)	Western Carolina	Eugene E. Stone III Stadium • Greenville, SC	Kathryn Clewley, UNC Greensboro	
2002	Furman (2)	3–0	College of Charleston	UNCG Soccer Stadium • Greensboro, NC	Andre'a Morrison, Furman	
2003	UNC Greensboro (5)	2–0	Furman	UNCG Soccer Stadium • Greensboro, NC	Rakel Logadottir, UNC Greensboro	
2004	Furman (3)	3–1	Davidson	UNCG Soccer Stadium • Greensboro, NC	Andre'a Morrison, Furman	
2005	Western Carolina (1)	1–0	Furman	Eugene E. Stone III Stadium • Greenville, SC	Alesha Row, Western Carolina	
2006	UNC Greensboro (6)	3–1	Furman	Catamount Athletic Complex • Cullowhee, NC	Shannon Donovon, UNC Greensboro	
2007	Furman (4)	3–1	UNC Greensboro	Alumni Soccer Stadium • Davidson, NC	Rachel Fry, Furman	
2008	Western Carolina (2)	0–0 (2–0 p)	UNC Greensboro (Note: UNCG's 2008 runner-up and 2010 finishes were later vacated.)	Patriots Point Soccer Complex • Mount Pleasant, SC	Caitlin Williams, Western Carolina	
2009	Davidson (4)	1–0 (a.e.t.)	College of Charleston	UNCG Soccer Stadium • Greensboro, NC	Amanda Flink, Davidson	
2010	UNC Greensboro ~~(7)~~	1–0	Samford	Catamount Athletic Complex • Cullowhee, NC	Kelsey Kearney, UNC Greensboro	
2011	Samford (1)	1–0	College of Charleston	UNCG Soccer Stadium • Greensboro, NC	Shanika Thomas, Samford	
2012	Georgia Southern (1)	0–0 (5–4 p)	Furman	Samford Soccer Complex • Birmingham, AL	Katie Merson, Georgia Southern	
2013	Furman (5)	3–1	Elon	Snyder Field • Spartanburg, SC	Stephanie DeVita, Furman	
2014	Mercer (1)	2–1	Samford	Catamount Athletic Complex • Cullowhee, NC	Maggie Cropp, Mercer	
2015	Furman (6)	1–0 (a.e.t.)	Mercer	Eugene E. Stone III Stadium • Greenville, SC	Stephanie DeVita, Furman	
2016	Samford (2)	2–1	East Tennessee State	Summers-Taylor Stadium • Johnson City, TN	Anna Allen, Samford	
2017	UNC Greensboro (7)	1–0	Western Carolina	Samford Soccer Complex • Birmingham, AL	Regan Lehman, UNCG	
2018	UNC Greensboro (8)	2–1	Furman	Betts Stadium • Macon, GA	Heida Ragney Vidarsdottir, UNCG	
2019	Samford (3)	1–0	Furman	UNCG Soccer Stadium • Greensboro, NC	Morgan McAslan, Samford	
2020	Furman (7)	2–1 (a.e.t.)	Samford	Samford Soccer Complex • Birmingham, AL	Jasmine Green, Furman	
2021	Samford (4)	4–2	Furman	Samford Soccer Complex • Birmingham, AL	Mary Raymond, Samford	
2022	Samford (5)	0–0 (6–5 p)	UNC Greensboro	Samford Soccer Complex • Birmingham, AL	Emma Donley, Samford	
2023	Western Carolina (3)	1–0	Samford	Catamount Athletic Complex • Cullowhee, NC	Paige McAra, Western Carolina	
2024	Samford (6)	1–0	Western Carolina	Catamount Athletic Complex • Cullowhee, NC	Caroline Donovan, Samford	
2025	Samford (7)	4–1	Mercer	Samford Soccer Complex • Birmingham, AL	Sam De Luca, Samford	
2026	Samford (8)	1–1 (4–2 p)	Mercer	Samford Soccer Complex • Birmingham, AL	Sam De Luca, Samford	

=== By school ===
As of 2026 Tournament

School	Apps.	W	L	T	Pct.	Finals	Titles	Winning years
Appalachian State	15	2	15	0	.118	0	0	—
Chattanooga	16	3	15	3	.214	0	0	—
College of Charleston	15	6	14	3	.326	2	0	—
Davidson	19	15	13	3	.532	6	4	1994, 1995, 1996, 2009
East Tennessee State	15	6	13	2	.333	1	0	—
Elon	9	4	8	1	.346	1	0	—
Furman	31	46	21	4	.676	17	7	1999, 2002, 2004, 2007, 2013, 2015, 2020
Georgia Southern	12	10	11	1	.477	3	1	2012
Mercer	12	12	10	4	.538	4	1	2014
Samford	18	31	8	5	.761	12	8	2011, 2016, 2019, 2021, 2022, 2024, 2025, 2026
Tennessee Tech	1	1	1	0	.500	0	0	—
The Citadel	12	5	12	0	.294	0	0	—
UNC Greensboro	28	25	16	7	.664	11	8	1997, 1998, 2000, 2001, 2003, 2006, 2010, 2017, 2018
VMI	11	2	11	1	.179	0	0	—
Western Carolina	23	17	19	3	.474	5	3	2004, 2008, 2023
Wofford	22	12	20	3	.386	1	0	—

Teams in italics no longer sponsor women's soccer in the Southern Conference. Tennessee Tech plays its first SoCon season in 2026.
