= 2017 Southern Conference women's soccer tournament =

- Classification: Division I
- Teams: 10
- Matches: 9
- Attendance: 2,998
- Site: Samford University Track & Soccer Stadium; Birmingham, Alabama (Semifinals and Final)
- Champions: UNC Greensboro (7th (Note: This is the 8th Southern Conference women's soccer tournament won by UNC Greensboro, but their 2010 title was later vacated.) title)
- Winning coach: Michael Coll (1st title)
- Broadcast: SoCon Digital Network; ESPN3 (Final)

2017 Southern Conference women's soccer standings
	Conf.						Overall
Team	W		L		T	PCT	W		L		T	PCT
Furman ‍†‍‍	8	–	0	–	1	.944	13	–	3	–	2	.778
Samford ‍†‍‍	8	–	0	–	1	.944	13	–	6	–	2	.667
UNC Greensboro ‍‍‡‍^{y}	5	–	2	–	2	.667	11	–	8	–	3	.568
Western Carolina ‍‍‍	4	–	4	–	1	.500	9	–	10	–	2	.476
VMI ‍‍‍	4	–	4	–	1	.500	7	–	11	–	1	.395
Chattanooga ‍‍‍	3	–	4	–	2	.444	5	–	10	–	4	.368
Mercer ‍‍‍	3	–	5	–	1	.389	10	–	10	–	1	.500
East Tennessee State ‍‍‍	3	–	6	–	0	.333	6	–	13	–	0	.316
Wofford ‍‍‍	2	–	6	–	1	.278	7	–	11	–	1	.395
The Citadel ‍‍‍	0	–	9	–	0	.000	5	–	13	–	0	.278
† – Conference champion ‡ – 2017 Southern Tournament champion y – Invited to the NCAA tournament As of November 11, 2017; Rankings from United Soccer Coaches Poll; Source:SoCon

The 2017 Southern Conference women's soccer tournament was the postseason women's soccer tournament for the Southern Conference held from October 25 through November 5, 2017. The first round and quarterfinals of the tournament were held at campus sites, while the semifinals and final took place at Samford University Track & Soccer Stadium in Birmingham, Alabama. The ten-team single-elimination tournament consisted of four rounds based on seeding from regular season conference play. The Samford Bulldogs were the defending champions, but they were eliminated from the 2017 tournament with a 2–1 semifinal loss in double overtime to the UNC Greensboro Spartans. UNC Greensboro won the tournament with a 1–0 win over the Western Carolina Catamounts in the final. This was the seventh Southern Conference tournament title for the UNC Greensboro women's soccer program and the first for head coach Michael Coll.

== Bracket ==
First round October 25
8	East Tennessee	5
9	Wofford	0
7	Mercer	3
10	The Citadel	0

Quarterfinals; October 28–29
1	Furman	2
8	East Tennessee	1
4	Western Carolina	1
5	VMI	0
2	Samford	5
7	Mercer	0
3	UNC Greensboro	2
6	Chattanooga	0

Semifinals; November 3
1	Furman	0
4	Western Carolina	2
2	Samford	1
3	UNC Greensboro	2^{2OT}

Championship; November 5
4	Western Carolina	0
3	UNC Greensboro	1

== Schedule ==
=== First Round ===
October 25, 2017	#8 East Tennessee State	5–0	#9 Wofford	Johnson City, Tennessee
7:00 p.m. EDT	Isabel Hodgson 17'; Fiona Dodge 55'; Elena Pisanii 58'; Emily McKerlie 58'; Pauline Vienne 63'	Report		Stadium: Taylor Stadium; Attendance: 223; Referee: Brandon Marina; Assistant referees: Dan Davis; Justin Howard; Fourth official: Hudson Owens

October 25, 2017	#7 Mercer	3–0	#10 The Citadel	Macon, Georgia
7:00 p.m. EDT	Ally Fordham 1'; Karina Castillo 38'; Logan Culver 45'	Report		Stadium: Bear Field; Attendance: 198; Referee: Matt Jackson; Assistant referees: Larry Stroud; Khadime Sabarra; Fourth official: Thomas Brigman

=== Quarterfinals ===
October 28, 2017	#3 UNC Greensboro	2–0	#6 Chattanooga	Greensboro, North Carolina
7:00 p.m. EDT	Cienna Rideout 42'; Melanie Spensiero 64'	Report		Stadium: UNCG Soccer Stadium; Attendance: 505; Referee: Benjamin Wooten; Assistant referees: Kaylib Robinson; Hudson Owens; Fourth official: Scott Bowers

October 28, 2017	#2 Samford	5–0	#7 Mercer	Birmingham, Alabama
7:00 p.m. CDT	Korrie Sauder 11'; Jermaine Seoposenwe 25', 56'; Grace Sommi 34'; Erin Bonner 82'	Report		Stadium: Samford University Track & Soccer Stadium; Attendance: 512; Referee: Jonathan Sauers; Assistant referees: Daniel Velez; Mike Palazzo; Fourth official: Amin Hadzic

October 29, 2017	#4 Western Carolina	1–0	#5 VMI	Cullowhee, North Carolina
1:00 p.m. EDT	Emily Threatt 5'	Report		Stadium: Catamount Athletic Complex; Attendance: 285; Referee: Eric Barnes; Assistant referees: Clive Edwards; Khadime Sabara; Fourth official: Scott Belote

October 29, 2017	#1 Furman	2–1	#8 East Tennessee State	Greenville, South Carolina
2:00 p.m. EDT	Rachel Shah 35'; Jordan Evens 39'	Report	21' Eleonora Goldoni	Stadium: Stone Soccer Stadium; Attendance: 310; Referee: Kevin Broadley; Assistant referees: Amin Hadzic; Daniel Burak; Fourth official: Michael Shealy

=== Semifinals ===
November 3, 2017	#1 Furman	0–2	#4 Western Carolina	Birmingham, Alabama
5:00 p.m. CDT		Report	9' Emily Threatt; 74' Deyana Walker	Stadium: Samford University Track & Soccer Stadium; Attendance: 342; Referee: Brandon Marion; Assistant referees: Kyle Johnston; Daniel Velez; Fourth official: Amin Hadzic

November 3, 2017	#2 Samford	1–2 (a.e.t.)	#3 UNC Greensboro	Birmingham, Alabama
7:30 p.m. CDT	Jermaine Seoposenwe 67'	Report	73', 102' Cienna Rideout	Stadium: Samford University Track & Soccer Stadium; Attendance: 511; Referee: Brandon Cohen; Assistant referees: Ryan Starr; Matt Jackson; Fourth official: Amin Hadzic

=== Final ===
November 5, 2017	#4 Western Carolina	0–1	#3 UNC Greensboro	Birmingham, Alabama
1:00 p.m. CST		Report	54' Emily Jensen	Stadium: Samford University Track & Soccer Stadium; Attendance: 112; Referee: Leland Grant; Assistant referees: Amanda Ross; Robert Dail; Fourth official: Brandon Marion

== Statistics ==
=== Goalscorers ===
3 Goals

- Cienna Rideout - UNC Greensboro
- Jermaine Seoposenwe - Samford

2 Goals

- Emily Threatt - Western Carolina

1 Goal

- Erin Bonner - Samford
- Karina Castillo - Mercer
- Logan Culver - Mercer
- Fiona Dodge - East Tennessee State
- Jordan Evans - Furman
- Ally Fordham - Mercer
- Eleonora Goldoni - East Tennessee State
- Isabel Hodgson - East Tennessee State
- Emily Jensen - UNC Greensboro
- Emily McKerlie - East Tennessee State
- Elena Pisanii - East Tennessee State
- Korrie Sauder - Samford
- Rachel Shah - Furman
- Grace Sommi - Samford
- Melanie Spensiero - UNC Greensboro
- Pauline Vienne - East Tennessee State
- Deyana Walker - Western Carolina

== See also ==
- 2017 Southern Conference Men's Soccer Tournament
