= 2016 Southern Conference women's soccer tournament =

- Classification: Division I
- Teams: 10
- Matches: 9
- Site: Taylor Stadium; Johnson City, Tennessee (Semifinals and Final)
- Champions: Samford (2nd title)
- Winning coach: Todd Yelton (2nd title)

2016 Southern Conference women's soccer standings
	Conf.						Overall
Team	W		L		T	PCT	W		L		T	PCT
Samford ‍†‍‡‍^{y}	8	–	1	–	0	.889	15	–	4	–	2	.762
East Tennessee State ‍‍‍	6	–	2	–	1	.722	13	–	6	–	2	.667
Furman ‍‍‍	6	–	3	–	0	.667	13	–	5	–	1	.711
Mercer ‍‍‍	6	–	3	–	0	.667	10	–	9	–	1	.525
UNC Greensboro ‍‍‍	4	–	4	–	1	.500	7	–	11	–	2	.400
Chattanooga ‍‍‍	4	–	4	–	1	.500	6	–	11	–	2	.368
VMI ‍‍‍	4	–	5	–	0	.444	8	–	12	–	0	.400
Western Carolina ‍‍‍	4	–	5	–	0	.444	8	–	12	–	0	.400
The Citadel ‍‍‍	1	–	8	–	0	.111	5	–	13	–	0	.278
Wofford ‍‍‍	0	–	8	–	1	.056	2	–	16	–	1	.132
† – Conference champion ‡ – 2016 Southern Tournament champion y – Invited to the NCAA tournament As of 2016-11-14; Rankings from NSCAA

The 2016 Southern Conference women's soccer tournament is the postseason women's soccer tournament for the Southern Conference held from October 26 to November 6, 2016. The nine match tournament was held at campus sites, with the semifinals and final held at Taylor Stadium in Johnson City, Tennessee. The ten team single-elimination tournament consisted of three rounds based on seeding from regular season conference play. The Furman Paladins were the defending tournament champions after defeating the Mercer Bears in the championship match.

== Bracket ==
First round Wednesday, Oct. 26
8	VMI	1^{OT}
9	The Citadel	0
7	Western Carolina	2^{2OT}
10	Wofford	1

Quarterfinals; Sat., Oct. 29 – Sun., Oct. 30
1	Samford	5
8	VMI	0
4	Furman	1^{OT}
5	UNC Greensboro	0
2	East Tennessee	2
7	Western Carolina	1
3	Mercer	3
6	Chattanooga	0

Semifinals; Friday, November 4
1	Samford	2
4	Furman	1
2	East Tennessee	3
3	Mercer	1

Championship; Sunday, November 6
1	Samford	2
2	East Tennessee	1

== Schedule ==
=== First round ===
October 26, 2016	#8 VMI	1–0 (a.e.t.)	#9 The Citadel	Lexington, Virginia
3:00 p.m. EST	Katelyn Lauziere 92'	Report		Stadium: Patchin Field; Referee: Scott Bowers

October 26, 2016	#7 Western Carolina	2–1 (a.e.t.)	#10 Wofford	Cullowhee, North Carolina
7:00 p.m. EST	Sayres McKenna 24'; Emma Haywood 110'	Report	Catie Slater 34'	Stadium: Catamount Athletic Complex; Referee: Jonathan Weiner

=== Quarterfinals ===
October 29, 2016	#1 Samford	5–0	#8 VMI	Birmingham, Alabama
7:00 p.m. EST	Jermaine Seoposenwe 1', 10'; Sara Smeltzer 31'; Taylor Borman 65'; Abriella Argueta 86'	Report		Stadium: SU Soccer Stadium; Referee: Jose DaSilva

October 29, 2016	#4 Furman	1–0 (a.e.t.)	#5 UNC Greensboro	Greenville, South Carolina
2:00 p.m. EST	Carlie Couch 91'	Report		Stadium: Stone Soccer Stadium; Referee: Brandon Adams

October 29, 2016	#2 East Tennessee State	2–1	#7 Western Carolina	Johnson City, Tennessee
7:00 p.m. EST	Molly Collinson 21'; Eleonora Goldoni 76'	Report	Kasey Cooke 73'	Stadium: Taylor Stadium

October 30, 2016	#3 Mercer	3–0	#6 Chattanooga	Macon, Georgia
4:00 p.m. EST	Valeria Bermeo 56'; Maddie Clark 63'; Team 65' (o.g.)	Report		Stadium: Bear Field; Referee: Richonne Clark

=== Semifinals ===
November 4, 2016	#1 Samford	2–1	#4 Furman	Johnson City, Tennessee
5:00 p.m. CST	Korrie Sauder 35'; Malcanisha Kelley 82'	Report	Molly Dwyer 80'	Stadium: Taylor Stadium; Referee: Brandon Marion

November 4, 2016	#2 East Tennessee State	3–1	#3 Mercer	Johnson City, Tennessee
7:30 p.m. CST	Isabel Hodgson 21', 77'; Molly Collinson 72'	Report	Maddie Clark 56'	Stadium: Taylor Stadium

=== Final ===
November 6, 2016	#1 Samford	2–1	#2 East Tennessee State	Johnson City, Tennessee
1:00 p.m. CST	Anna Allen 36'; Abriella Argueta 74'	Report	Isabel Hodgson 3'	Stadium: Taylor Stadium; Referee: Leland Grant
