= 2021 Southern Conference women's soccer tournament =

- Classification: Division I
- Teams: 10
- Matches: 9
- Attendance: 1,803
- Site: Campus Sites (#7 & #8 seed - First Round); Campus Sites (#1 & #2 seeds - Quarterfinals & Semifinals); Campus Sites (#1 seed - Final)
- Champions: Samford (4th title)
- Winning coach: Todd Yelton (4th title)
- MVP: Mary Raymond (Samford)
- Broadcast: ESPN+

2021 Southern Conference women's soccer standings
| | Conf. | | | | | | Overall |
| Team | W | | L | | T | PCT | W | | L | | T | PCT |
|---|---|---|---|---|---|---|---|---|---|---|---|---|
| Samford ‍†‍‡‍^{y} | 9 | – | 0 | – | 0 | 1.000 | 16 | – | 3 | – | 3 | .795 |
| Furman ‍‍‍ | 6 | – | 3 | – | 0 | .667 | 12 | – | 6 | – | 1 | .658 |
| Western Carolina ‍‍‍ | 5 | – | 4 | – | 0 | .556 | 11 | – | 8 | – | 1 | .575 |
| Mercer ‍‍‍ | 3 | – | 2 | – | 4 | .556 | 7 | – | 6 | – | 5 | .528 |
| East Tennessee State ‍‍‍ | 4 | – | 4 | – | 1 | .500 | 7 | – | 6 | – | 3 | .531 |
| The Citadel ‍‍‍ | 3 | – | 4 | – | 2 | .444 | 10 | – | 7 | – | 2 | .579 |
| UNC Greensboro ‍‍‍ | 3 | – | 4 | – | 2 | .444 | 4 | – | 8 | – | 6 | .389 |
| Chattanooga ‍‍‍ | 3 | – | 5 | – | 1 | .389 | 6 | – | 11 | – | 3 | .375 |
| Wofford ‍‍‍ | 3 | – | 5 | – | 1 | .389 | 5 | – | 12 | – | 2 | .316 |
| VMI ‍‍‍ | 0 | – | 8 | – | 1 | .056 | 3 | – | 16 | – | 1 | .175 |
† – Conference champion ‡ – 2021 Southern Tournament champion y – Invited to the NCAA tournament As of December 7, 2021; Rankings from United Soccer Coaches Poll; Source:SoCon

The 2021 Southern Conference women's soccer tournament was the postseason women's soccer tournament for the Southern Conference held from October 26 through November 7, 2021. The tournament was held at campus sites, with the higher seed hosting. The ten-team single-elimination tournament consisted of four rounds based on seeding from regular season conference play. The Furman Paladins were the defending champions but were unable to defend their crown, losing 4–2 in the final to the Samford Bulldogs. This was the fourth Southern Conference tournament title for the Samford women's soccer program, all four of which have come under coach Todd Yelton. As tournament champions, Samford earned the Southern Conference's automatic berth into the 2021 NCAA Division I Women's Soccer Tournament.

== Seeding ==
All ten teams from the regular season qualified for the 2021 Tournament. Seeding was based on regular season records of each team. Tiebreakers were required to determine the sixth and sevenths seeds as both UNC Greensboro and The Citadel finished the regular season with 3–4–2 records. UNC Greensboro defeated The Citadel 5–0 on October 10, and earned the sixth seed, while The Citadel was the seventh seed. A tiebreaker was also required to determine the eight and ninth seeds as Chattanooga and Wofford finished the regular season with 3–5–1 records. Chattanooga defeated Wofford 1–0 on October 10 and earned the eight seed, while Wofford was the ninth seed.

| Seed | School | Conference Record | Points |
|---|---|---|---|
| 1 | Samford | 9–0–0 | 27 |
| 2 | Furman | 6–3–0 | 18 |
| 3 | Western Carolina | 5–4–0 | 15 |
| 4 | East Tennessee State | 4–4–1 | 13 |
| 5 | Mercer | 3–2–4 | 13 |
| 6 | UNC Greensboro | 3–4–2 | 11 |
| 7 | The Citadel | 3–4–2 | 11 |
| 8 | Chattanooga | 3–5–1 | 10 |
| 9 | Wofford | 3–5–1 | 10 |
| 10 | VMI | 0–8–1 | 1 |

== Bracket ==
First round Tuesday, October 26
8 | Chattanooga (pen.) | 1 (5)
9 | Wofford | 1 (3)
7 | The Citadel | 4
10 | VMI | 1

Quarterfinals; Friday, October 29
1 | Samford | 2
8 | Chattanooga | 0
4 | East Tennessee State | 0
5 | Mercer | 2
2 | Furman (a.e.t.) | 2
7 | The Citadel | 1
3 | Western Carolina (a.e.t.) | 1
6 | UNC Greensboro | 0

Semifinals; Sunday, October 31
1 | Samford | 1
5 | Mercer | 0
2 | Furman | 1
3 | Western Carolina | 0

Championship; Sunday, November 7
1 | Samford | 4
2 | Furman | 2

== Schedule ==
=== First Round ===
| October 26, 2021 | #7 The Citadel | 4–1 | #10 VMI | Charleston, SC |
| 3:00 p.m. ET | Alex Madden 32'; Suzuka Yosue 55', 56' (pen.); Maria Contreras 86' | Report | (yellow card) 56' Jillian Hall; 87' Whitney Edwards-Roberson | Stadium: WLI Field; Attendance: 227 |

| October 26, 2021 | #8 Chattanooga | 1–1 (a.e.t.) (5–3 p) | #9 Wofford | Chattanooga, TN |
| 6:00 p.m. ET | Maggie Shaw 89' | Report | 48' Abigail McKenzie | Stadium: UTC Sports Complex; Attendance: 189; Referee: Brandon Marion; Assistant referees: Kris Fabick; Dominic Kennedy; Fourth official: Carlos Pielago |
| | Penalties |
| | Mackenzie Smith (penalty scored); Faith Gober (penalty scored); Julia Perrusquia (penalty scored); Ao Yamada (penalty scored); Grace Klippenstein (penalty scored) | | (penalty scored) Caileen Almeida; (penalty missed) Leanna Guion; (penalty scored) Rachel Rasins; (penalty scored) Alexis Mapplebeck |

=== Quarterfinals ===
| October 29, 2021 | #1 Samford | 2–0 | #8 Chattanooga | Homewood, AL |
| 4:00 p.m. CT | Caroline Donovan 23'; Audrey Kleiman 33' | Report | | Stadium: Samford Track and Soccer Stadium; Attendance: 123; Referee: Carlos Pielago; Assistant referees: Khadime Sabara; Oladokun Faduyile |

| October 29, 2021 | #2 Furman | 2–1 (a.e.t.) | #7 The Citadel | Greenville, SC |
| 5:30 p.m. ET | Kyndal Anderson 62'; Nieva Gaither 92' | Report | 70' Jordyn Geller | Stadium: Stone Stadium; Attendance: 207; Referee: James McKean; Assistant referees: Rick Rogers; Benjamin Ellis; Fourth official: Shannon Duke |

| October 29, 2021 | #4 East Tennessee State | 0–2 | #5 Mercer | Homewood, AL |
| 6:30 p.m. CT | Shu Ohba (yellow card) 54' | Report | 10' Kendall Cook; 48' Payton Schurr; (yellow card) 83' Team | Stadium: Samford Track and Soccer Stadium; Attendance: 70; Referee: Kyle Johnston; Assistant referees: Kevin Flynn; Howard Ash |

| October 29, 2021 | #3 Western Carolina | 1–0 (a.e.t.) | #6 UNC Greensboro | Greenville, SC |
| 8:00 p.m. ET | Valentine Pursey 93' | Report | (yellow card) 75' Aiyana Tyler-Cooper | Stadium: Stone Stadium; Attendance: 95; Referee: Danny Thornberry; Assistant referees: Kiah Haslett; Lucy Bell; Fourth official: Shannon Duke |

=== Semifinals ===
| October 31, 2021 | #1 Samford | 1–0 | #5 Mercer | Homewood, AL |
| 1:00 p.m. CT | Nikki Bario (yellow card) 75'; Zoe Perrin 89' | Report | | Stadium: Samford Track and Soccer Stadium; Attendance: 180; Referee: Brandon Marion; Assistant referees: Khadime Sabara; Kiah Haslett |

| October 31, 2021 | #2 Furman | 1–0 | #3 Western Carolina | Greenville, SC |
| 2:00 p.m. ET | Jasmine Greene 82' | Report | (yellow card) 78' Reily Nelson; (yellow card) 82' Kirsten Hahn | Stadium: Stone Stadium; Attendance: 312; Referee: Raymond Thomas; Assistant referees: Lucy Bell; Matthew Bell; Fourth official: Ralph Polson |

=== Final ===
| November 7, 2021 | #1 Samford | 4–2 | #2 Furman | Homewood, AL |
| 1:00 p.m. CT | Mary Raymond 7', 46'; Ella Simpson 57'; Alyssa Frazier 63', (yellow card) 67' | Report | 26' Hannah Farr; 36' Jasmine Greene | Stadium: Samford Track and Soccer Stadium; Attendance: 400; Referee: Brian Miller; Assistant referees: Kiah Haslett; Brandi Fletcher |

== Statistics ==
=== Goalscorers ===
There were 23 goals scored in 9 matches, for an average of 2.56 goals per match (as of November 7, 2021).

2 goals

- Jasmine Greene – Furman
- Mary Raymond – Samford
- Suzuka Yosue – The Citadel

1 goal

- Maggie Shaw – Chattanooga
- Kyndal Anderson – Furman
- Hannah Farr – Furman
- Nieva Gaither – Furman
- Kendall Cook – Mercer
- Payton Schurr – Mercer
- Caroline Donovan – Samford
- Alyssa Frazier – Samford
- Audrey Kleinman – Samford
- Zoe Perrin – Samford
- Ella Simpson – Samford
- Maria Contreras – The Citadel
- Jordyn Geller – The Citadel
- Alex Madden – The Citadel
- Whitney Edwards-Roberson – VMI
- Valentine Pursey – Western Carolina
- Abigail McKenzie – Wofford

== All-Tournament team ==
| Player | Team |
|---|---|
| Mel Mikoy | The Citadel |
| Taylor Limprevil | East Tennessee State |
| Camryn Bolick | Furman |
| Hannah Farr | Furman |
| Faith Hauberg | Furman |
| Jordyn Ebert | Mercer |
| Payton Schurr | Mercer |
| Ashley Avelino | UNC Greensboro |
| Morgan McAslan | Samford |
| Ellia Simpson | Samford |
| **Mary Raymond** | Samford |
| Kylie Gazza | Samford |
| Maggie Shaw | Chattanooga |
| Whitney Edwards-Robinson | VMI |
| Kaitlyn Galbraith | Western Carolina |
| Abbie Wise | Western Carolina |
| Abigail McKenzie | Wofford |

MVP in bold
