= 2019 Southern Conference women's soccer tournament =

- Classification: Division I
- Teams: 10
- Matches: 9
- Attendance: 2,195
- Site: UNCG Soccer Stadium; Greensboro, North Carolina (Semifinals and Final)
- Champions: Samford (3rd title)
- Winning coach: Todd Yelton (3rd title)
- MVP: Morgan McAslan (Samford)
- Broadcast: SoCon Digital Network; ESPN+

2019 Southern Conference women's soccer standings
| | Conf. | | | | | | Overall |
| Team | W | | L | | T | PCT | W | | L | | T | PCT |
|---|---|---|---|---|---|---|---|---|---|---|---|---|
| Samford ‍†‍‡‍^{y} | 7 | – | 1 | – | 1 | .833 | 13 | – | 4 | – | 5 | .705 |
| Furman ‍†‍‍ | 7 | – | 1 | – | 1 | .833 | 14 | – | 6 | – | 1 | .690 |
| Mercer ‍‍‍ | 7 | – | 2 | – | 0 | .778 | 16 | – | 4 | – | 0 | .800 |
| UNC Greensboro ‍‍‍ | 7 | – | 2 | – | 0 | .778 | 10 | – | 8 | – | 2 | .550 |
| Western Carolina ‍‍‍ | 5 | – | 4 | – | 0 | .556 | 11 | – | 8 | – | 0 | .579 |
| Chattanooga ‍‍‍ | 4 | – | 4 | – | 1 | .500 | 9 | – | 6 | – | 4 | .579 |
| Wofford ‍‍‍ | 3 | – | 6 | – | 0 | .333 | 7 | – | 12 | – | 0 | .368 |
| ETSU ‍‍‍ | 1 | – | 6 | – | 2 | .222 | 5 | – | 11 | – | 4 | .350 |
| The Citadel ‍‍‍ | 1 | – | 8 | – | 0 | .111 | 6 | – | 11 | – | 2 | .368 |
| VMI ‍‍‍ | 0 | – | 8 | – | 1 | .056 | 1 | – | 16 | – | 2 | .105 |
† – Conference champion ‡ – 2019 Southern Tournament champion y – Invited to the NCAA tournament As of December 9, 2019; Rankings from United Soccer Coaches Poll; Source:SoCon

The 2019 Southern Conference women's soccer tournament was the postseason women's soccer tournament for the Southern Conference held from October 30 through November 10, 2019.

The first round and quarterfinals of the tournament were held at campus sites, while the semifinals and final took place at UNCG Soccer Stadium in Greensboro, North Carolina.

The ten-team single-elimination tournament consisted of four rounds based on seeding from regular season conference play. The UNC Greensboro Spartans were the defending champions but were unable to defend their crown, losing 1–0 t the Furman Paladins in the semifinal.

The Samford Bulldogs were the eventual champions, defeating Furman 1–0 in the final. This was the third Southern Conference tournament title for the Samford women's soccer program, all three of which have come under coach Todd Yelton.

== Bracket ==
First round Wednesday, October 30
8 | ETSU | 0
9 | The Citadel | 1
7 | Wofford | 2
10 | VMI | 1

Quarterfinals; Saturday/Sunday, November 2/3
1 | Samford | 5
9 | The Citadel | 1
4 | Mercer | 1
5 | Western Carolina | 0
2 | Furman | 3
7 | Wofford | 0
3 | UNC Greensboro | 1 (4)
6 | Chattanooga | 1 (2)

Semifinals; Friday, November 8
1 | Samford | 3
4 | Mercer | 0
2 | Furman | 1
3 | UNC Greensboro | 0

Championship; Sunday, November 10
1 | Samford | 1
2 | Furman | 0

== Schedule ==
=== First Round ===
| October 30, 2019 | #7 Wofford | 2–1 | #10 VMI | Spartanburg, South Carolina |
| 5:00 p.m. EST | Allie Cardew 30'; Cameryn Burke 51' | Report | 18' Sierra Brewer | Stadium: Snyder Field; Attendance: 104; Referee: Kyle Johnston; Assistant referees: Alex Villanueva; Gregory Brigman |

| October 30, 2019 | #8 ETSU | 0–1 | #9 The Citadel | Johnson City, Tennessee |
| 7:00 p.m. EST | Elena Pisani (yellow card) 31' | Report | 59' Suzuka Yosue; (yellow card) 76' Emily Mason; (yellow card) 83' Logan Dix | Stadium: Summers-Taylor Stadium; Attendance: 187; Referee: Brandon Marion; Assistant referees: Zach McWhorter; Carlos Pielago; Fourth official: Justin Howard |

=== Quarterfinals ===
| November 2, 2019 | #1 Samford | 5–1 | #9 The Citadel | Homewood, Alabama |
| 3:00 p.m. EST | Kyla Reynolds 24'; Kylie Gazza 52'; Mary Raymond 65', 70'; Keyli Borman 78' | Report | (yellow card) 78' Hannah Roth; 89' Kate Manzione | Stadium: Samford Soccer Stadium; Attendance: 178; Referee: Patrick Schmidt; Assistant referees: Brandi Fletcher; Joe Kirkpatrick; Fourth official: Hasin Gandhakwala |

| November 3, 2019 | #2 Furman | 3–0 | #7 Wofford | Greenville, South Carolina |
| 2:00 p.m. EST | Jasmine Green 56'; Faith Hauberg 59'; Erin Houlihan 62'; MG Garr (yellow card) 80' | Report | | Stadium: Stone Stadium; Attendance: 234; Referee: Eric Usher; Assistant referees: Robert Dail; Justin Howard; Fourth official: Khadime Sabara |

| November 3, 2019 | #4 Mercer | 1–0 (a.e.t.) | #5 Western Carolina | Macon, Georgia |
| 4:00 p.m. EST | Abigail Zoeller (yellow card) 96'; Ally Fordham 108' | Report | (yellow card) 59' Amber Van Den Berg; (yellow card) 77' Reily Nelson | Stadium: Bear Field; Attendance: 375; Referee: Kyle Johnston; Assistant referees: Eric Barnes; Tarik Veledar; Fourth official: Mike Palazzo |

| November 3, 2019 | #3 UNC Greensboro | 1–1 (a.e.t.) (4–2 p) | #6 Chattanooga | Greensboro, North Carolina |
| 4:00 p.m. EST | Sophie Stewart-Hobbs 41'; Gracie Timbario (yellow card) 44' | Report | (yellow card) 44' Jordan Mueller; (yellow card) 80' Shelby Hash; 89' Osa Iyare; (yellow card) 99' Lauren Dluzewski | Stadium: UNCG Soccer Stadium; Attendance: 210; Referee: Robert Velbis; Assistant referees: Rick Rogers; Erick Varone; Fourth official: Aaron Hormuth |
| | Penalties |
| | Isabelle Blomdahl (penalty scored); Kaley Tucker (penalty scored); Gabi Santora (penalty scored); Marissa Ferrantino (penalty scored) | | (penalty scored) Hollie Massey; (penalty missed) Bailey Gale; (penalty missed) Jordan Mueller; (penalty scored) Chloe Arnold |

=== Semifinals ===
| November 8, 2019 | #1 Samford | 3–0 | #4 Mercer | Greensboro, North Carolina |
| 4:00 p.m. EST | Mercer Own Goal 45'; Keyli Borman 71'; Erin Bonner 86' (pen.) | Report | | Stadium: UNCG Soccer Stadium; Attendance: 203; Referee: Brian Miller; Assistant referees: Benjamin Wooten; Rick Rogers; Fourth official: Hachim El Bariqi |

| November 8, 2019 | #2 Furman | 1–0 | #3 UNC Greensboro | Greensboro, North Carolina |
| 6:30 p.m. EST | Isabella Gutierrez 2'; Erin O'Hearn (yellow card) 51' | Report | (yellow card) 45' Isabelle Blomdhal; (yellow card) 86' Cienna Rideout | Stadium: UNCG Soccer Stadium; Attendance: 452; Referee: Kevin Broadley; Assistant referees: Kiah Haslett; Zachary McWhorter; Fourth official: Hachim El Bariqi |

=== Final ===
| November 10, 2019 | #1 Samford | 1–0 | #2 Furman | Greensboro, North Carolina |
| 2:00 p.m. EST | Alyssa Frazier 16'; Mary Raymond (yellow card) 38' | Report | (yellow card) 57' Erin O'Hearn | Stadium: UNCG Soccer Stadium; Attendance: 352; Referee: Mary Penso; Assistant referees: Jeremy L.B. Smith; Tiffini Turpin; Fourth official: John Rush |

== Statistics ==
=== Goalscorers ===
2 Goals

- Keyli Borman (Samford)
- Mary Raymond (Samford)

1 Goal

- Erin Bonner (Samford)
- Sierra Brewer (VMI)
- Cameryn Burke (Wofford)
- Allie Cardew (Wofford)
- Ally Fordham (Mercer)
- Alyssa Frazier (Samford)
- Kylie Gazza (Samford)
- Jasmine Green (Furman)
- Isabella Gutierrez (Furman)
- Faith Hauberg (Furman)
- Erin Houlihan (Furman)
- Osa Iyare (Chattanooga)
- Kate Manzione (The Citadel)
- Kyla Reynolds (Samford)
- Sophie Stewart-Hobbs (UNC Greensboro)
- Suzuka Yosue (The Citadel)

Own Goals

- Mercer vs. Samford

== All-Tournament team ==
| Player | Team |
|---|---|
| Suzuka Yosue | The Citadel |
| Elena Pisani | ETSU |
| Jordan Evens | Furman |
| Arianna Milicia | Furman |
| Caitlyn Reilly | Furman |
| Elizabeth Hargis | Mercer |
| Payton Shurr | Mercer |
| Marissa Ferrantino | UNC Greensboro |
| Kaley Tucker | UNC Greensboro |
| Kylie Gazza | Samford |
| Allie Lourie | Samford |
| **Morgan McAslan** | Samford |
| Taylore Miller | Samford |
| Maggie Shaw | Chattanooga |
| Sam Franklin | VMI |
| Reily Nelson | Western Carolina |
| Erin Roche | Wofford |

MVP in bold

== See also ==
- 2019 Southern Conference Men's Soccer Tournament
