= 2024 Southern Conference women's soccer tournament =

- Classification: Division I
- Teams: 10
- Matches: 9
- Attendance: 4,735
- Site: Campus Sites (#7 & #8 seed - First Round); Campus Sites (#1 & #2 seeds - Quarterfinals & Semifinals); Campus Sites (#1 seed - Final)
- Champions: Samford Bulldogs (6th title)
- Winning coach: Todd Yelton (6th title)
- MVP: Caroline Donovan (Samford Bulldogs)
- Broadcast: ESPN+

2024 Southern Conference women's soccer standings
	Conf.						Overall
Team	W		L		T	PCT	W		L		T	PCT
Western Carolina ‍†‍‍	8	–	0	–	1	.944	15	–	3	–	3	.786
Samford ‍‍‡‍^{y}	6	–	1	–	2	.778	12	–	7	–	3	.614
Mercer ‍‍‍	5	–	2	–	2	.667	11	–	5	–	3	.658
Furman ‍‍‍	5	–	2	–	2	.667	10	–	7	–	3	.575
Chattanooga ‍‍‍	5	–	4	–	0	.556	7	–	9	–	3	.447
UNC Greensboro ‍‍‍	3	–	3	–	3	.500	5	–	9	–	5	.395
ETSU ‍‍‍	3	–	3	–	3	.500	4	–	8	–	4	.375
VMI ‍‍‍	1	–	7	–	1	.167	6	–	11	–	2	.368
Wofford ‍‍‍	1	–	7	–	1	.167	6	–	12	–	2	.350
The Citadel ‍‍‍	0	–	8	–	1	.056	4	–	11	–	3	.306
† – Conference champion ‡ – 2024 SoCON Tournament champion y – Invited to the NCAA Tournament; As of December 10, 2024; Rankings from United Soccer Coaches Poll; Source:SoCon

The 2024 Southern Conference women's soccer tournament was the postseason women's soccer tournament for the Southern Conference held from October 29 through November 10, 2024. The tournament was held at campus sites, with the higher seed hosting. The ten-team single-elimination tournament consisted of four rounds based on seeding from regular season conference play. The Western Carolina Catamounts were the defending champions. Western Carolina was the number one seed for the tournament but was unable to defend their title. They reached the final but fell 1–0 to Samford Bulldogs. This was the sixth Southern Conference tournament title for the Samford women's soccer program, all of which have come under head coach Todd Yelton. Samford has won three of the last four SoCon Tournaments. As tournament champions, Samford earned the Southern Conference's automatic berth into the 2024 NCAA Division I women's soccer tournament.

== Seeding ==
All ten teams who sponsored women's soccer in the Southern Conference qualified for the 2024 Tournament. Seeding was based on regular season records of each team. A tiebreaker was required to determine the third and fourth seeds as Furman and Mercer both finished with 5–2–2 regular season records. The two teams tied their regular season match-up 1–1. Furman won the tiebreaker and earned the third seed. Another tiebreaker was required between ETSU and UNC Greensboro to determine the sixth and seventh seeds as both teams finished 3–3–3 in regular season play. The two teams drew their regular season match 1–1. ETSU won the tiebreaker and earned the sixth seed, while UNC Greensboro had to play in the First Round. A final tiebreaker was required for the eighth and ninth seeds as both VMI and Wofford finished 1–7–1 during the regular season. The two teams tied their regular season match-up 1–1. Wofford won the tiebreaker, was the eighth seed, and earned the right to host the tournament match-up between the two teams.

Seed	School	Conference Record	Points
1	Western Carolina	8–0–1	25
2	Samford	6–1–2	20
3	Furman	5–2–2	17
4	Mercer	5–2–2	17
5	Chattanooga	5–4–0	15
6	ETSU	3–3–3	12
7	UNC Greensboro	3–3–3	12
8	Wofford	1–7–1	4
9	VMI	1–7–1	4
10	The Citadel	0–8–1	1

== Bracket ==
First round Tuesday, October 29
8	Wofford	3
9	VMI	2
7	UNC Greensboro	3
10	The Citadel	0

Quarterfinals; Friday, November 1
1	Western Carolina	6
8	Wofford	1
4	Mercer	2
5	Chattanooga (a.e.t.)	3
2	Samford	2
7	UNC Greensboro	1
3	Furman	2
6	ETSU	1

Semifinals; Sunday, November 3
1	Western Carolina	2
5	Chattanooga	0
2	Samford	1
3	Furman	0

Championship; Sunday, November 10
1	Western Carolina	0
2	Samford	1

== Schedule ==
=== First round ===
October 29, 2024	#8 Wofford	3–2	#9 VMI	Spartanburg, SC
4:00 p.m. EDT	Megan Childress 54', 62'; Aly Bernhard 83'	Report	79' Isabella Bruzonic; 89' Riley Boucher	Stadium: Snyder Field; Attendance: 103; Referee: Khadime Sabara; Assistant referees: Gunaan Park; Mustapha Mushood; Fourth official: Patrick Lama

October 29, 2024	#7 UNC Greensboro	3–0	#10 The Citadel	Greensboro, NC
4:00 p.m. EDT	Taylor Mentzer 21', 65'; Ryen Ortiz (yellow card) 53'; Azumi Oka 73'	Report	(yellow card) 53' Casey O'Connor	Stadium: UNCG Soccer Stadium; Attendance: 309; Referee: Kevin Maurer; Assistant referees: Rick Rogers; Marcus Moss; Fourth official: Joe Worley

=== Quarterfinals ===
November 1, 2024	#2 Samford	2–1	#7 UNC Greensboro	Homewood, AL
4:00 p.m. CDT	Maison Wells 85'; Layton Glisson 90'; Mary-Ainsley Alack (yellow card) 90'	Report	80' Rachel Poplin; (yellow card) 86' Mel Herrera	Stadium: Samford Track and Soccer Stadium; Attendance: 417; Referee: Nicole Green; Assistant referees: Benjamin Oakley; Aaron Hormuth; Fourth official: Tim Eller

November 1, 2024	#4 Mercer	2–3 (a.e.t.)	#5 Chattanooga	Cullowhee, NC
4:00 p.m. EDT	Larkin Thomason 32', 55'	Report	20', (yellow card) 87' Caroline Richvalsky; 21' EG Dillard; 100' Clarissa Salinas	Stadium: Catamount Soccer Complex; Attendance: 237

November 1, 2024	#3 Furman	2–1	#6 ETSU	Homewood, AL
7:00 p.m. CDT	Valentina Mosquera 41'; Tara Katz 70'	Report	(yellow card) 58' Madi Hook; 77' Ella Parker	Stadium: Samford Track and Soccer Stadium; Attendance: 113; Referee: Khadime Sabara; Assistant referees: Mustapha Moshood; Tarver Pyke; Fourth official: Patrick Lama

November 1, 2024	#1 Western Carolina	6–1	#8 Wofford	Cullowhee, NC
7:00 p.m. EDT	Naya Marcil 2', 14'; Sofia Goclowski 6', 12'; Isabella DeMarco 7'; Samantha Vibberts 25' (pen.)	Report	85' Megan Childress	Stadium: Catamount Soccer Complex; Attendance: 452; Referee: Deny Kulasinac; Assistant referees: Thomas Rutherford; Elon Dockery; Fourth official: Tim Eller

=== Semifinals ===
November 3, 2024	#2 Samford	1–0	#3 Furman	Homewood, AL
1:00 p.m. CST	Layton Gilsson (yellow card) 6'; Brigid McElderry (yellow card) 33'; Kaitlin Maynard (yellow card) 56'; Caroline Donovan (yellow card) 78'; Samantha De Luca 88'	Report		Stadium: Samford Track and Soccer Stadium; Attendance: 513

November 3, 2024	#1 Western Carolina	2–0	#5 Chattanooga	Cullowhee, NC
2:00 p.m. EST	Naya Marcil 17'; Milla Syska 81'	Report	(yellow card) 48' Mary Mueth; (yellow card) 64' Ava Robitaille	Stadium: Catamount Soccer Complex; Attendance: 717; Referee: Albert Kyei-Mensah; Assistant referees: Thomas Rutherford; Tyler Bost; Fourth official: Khadime Sabara

=== Final ===
November 10, 2024	#1 Western Carolina	0–1	#2 Samford	Cullowhee, NC
2:00 p.m. EST		Report	53' Ella Simpson	Stadium: Catamount Soccer Complex; Attendance: 1,874; Referee: John Matto; Assistant referees: Joshua Lampkins; Derek Guerrier; Fourth official: Joe Kirkpatrick

== Statistics ==
=== Goalscorers ===
There were 30 goals scored in 9 matches, for an average of 3.33 goals per match (as of November 10, 2024).

3 goals

- Megan Childress – Wofford
- Naya Marcil – Western Carolina

2 goals

- Sofia Goclowski – Western Carolina
- Taylor Mentzer – UNC Greensboro
- Larkin Thomason – Mercer

1 goal

- Aly Bernhard – Wofford
- Riley Boucher – VMI
- Isabella Bruzonic – VMI
- Samantha De Luca – Samford
- Isabella DeMarco – Western Carolina
- EG Dillard – Chattanooga
- Layton Glisson – Samford
- Tara Katz – Furman
- Valentina Mosquera – Furman
- Azumi Oka – UNC Greensboro
- Ella Parker – ETSU
- Rachel Poplin – UNC Greensboro
- Caroline Richvalsky – Chattanooga
- Clarissa Salinas – Chattanooga
- Ella Simpson – Samford
- Milla Syska – Western Carolina
- Samantha Vibberts – Western Carolina
- Maison Wells – Samford

== All-Tournament team ==
Player	Team
Caroline Richvalsky	Chattanooga
Clarissa Salinas	Chattanooga
Natalie Capannelli	ETSU
Katie Bengough	Furman
Ellie Herrmann	Furman
Larkin Thomason	Mercer
**Caroline Donovan**	Samford
Kaitlin Maynard	Samford
Ella Simpson	Samford
Maison Wells	Samford
Elisa Fuentes	The Citadel
Rachel Poplin	UNC Greensboro
Riley Boucher	VMI
Naya Marcil	Western Carolina
Mary Mueth	Western Carolina
Abbie Wise	Western Carolina
Megan Childress	Wofford

MVP in bold
