= 2022 Southern Conference women's soccer tournament =

- Classification: Division I
- Teams: 10
- Matches: 9
- Attendance: 2,772
- Site: Campus Sites (#7 & #8 seed - First Round); Campus Sites (#1 & #2 seeds - Quarterfinals & Semifinals); Campus Sites (#1 seed - Final)
- Champions: Samford (5th title)
- Winning coach: Todd Yelton (5th title)
- MVP: Emma Donley (Samford)
- Broadcast: ESPN+

2022 Southern Conference women's soccer standings
	Conf.						Overall
Team	W		L		T	PCT	W		L		T	PCT
Samford ‍†‍‡‍^{y}	5	–	1	–	3	.722	11	–	4	–	7	.659
Chattanooga ‍†‍‍	5	–	1	–	3	.722	8	–	5	–	5	.583
Mercer ‍‍‍	4	–	1	–	4	.667	9	–	4	–	7	.625
UNC Greensboro ‍‍‍	4	–	3	–	2	.556	10	–	7	–	4	.571
Western Carolina ‍‍‍	4	–	4	–	1	.500	5	–	8	–	5	.417
ETSU ‍‍‍	3	–	3	–	3	.500	5	–	6	–	6	.471
The Citadel ‍‍‍	4	–	5	–	0	.444	10	–	9	–	0	.526
Wofford ‍‍‍	3	–	4	–	2	.444	9	–	8	–	3	.525
Furman ‍‍‍	3	–	4	–	2	.444	8	–	9	–	2	.474
VMI ‍‍‍	0	–	9	–	0	.000	1	–	17	–	2	.100
† – Conference champion ‡ – 2022 Southern Tournament champion y – Invited to the NCAA Tournament; As of December 6, 2022; Rankings from United Soccer Coaches Poll; Source:SoCon

The 2022 Southern Conference women's soccer tournament was the postseason women's soccer tournament for the Southern Conference held from October 25 through November 6, 2022. The tournament was held at campus sites, with the higher seed hosting. The ten-team single-elimination tournament consisted of four rounds based on seeding from regular season conference play. The Samford Bulldogs were the defending champions. Samford successfully defended their crown defeating the fourth seed UNC Greensboro in a penalty-shoot out in the final. This was the fifth Southern Conference tournament title for the Samford women's soccer program, all five of which have come under coach Todd Yelton. As tournament champions, Samford earned the Southern Conference's automatic berth into the 2022 NCAA Division I Women's Soccer Tournament.

== Seeding ==
All ten teams from the regular season qualified for the 2022 Tournament. Seeding was based on regular season records of each team. A tiebreaker was required to determine the first and second seeds after Chattanooga and Samford both finished the season with 5–1–3 records. The two teams tied their regular season match. The second tiebreaker was record against the highest remaining seed, Mercer. Chattanooga defeated Mercer during the regular season and was therefore the first seed. A second tiebreaker was required to determine the eighth and ninth seeds as Wofford and Furman both finished the regular season with 3–4–2 records. The two teams also tied their regular season matchup, so a second tiebreaker of record against the highest remaining seed was used again. Wofford was awarded the eighth seed based on their regular season victory over Chattanooga.

Seed	School	Conference Record	Points
1	Chattanooga	5–1–3	18
2	Samford	5–1–3	18
3	Mercer	4–1–4	16
4	UNC Greensboro	4–3–2	14
5	Western Carolina	4–4–1	13
6	ETSU	3–3–3	12
7	The Citadel	4–5–0	12
8	Wofford	3–4–2	11
9	Furman	3–4–2	11
10	VMI	0–9–0	0

== Bracket ==
First round Tuesday, October 25
8	Wofford	2
9	Furman	1
7	The Citadel	3
10	VMI	0

Quarterfinals; Friday, October 28
1	Chattanooga	2
8	Wofford	1
4	UNC Greensboro	2
5	Western Carolina	1
2	Samford	2
7	The Citadel	0
3	Mercer (pen.)	1 (3)
6	ETSU	1 (2)

Semifinals; Sunday, October 30
1	Chattanooga	1
4	UNC Greensboro (a.e.t.)	2
2	Samford	1
3	Mercer	0

Championship; Sunday, November 6
4	UNC Greensboro	0 (5)
2	Samford (pen.)	0 (6)

== Schedule ==
=== First round ===
October 25	#7 The Citadel	3–0	#10 VMI	Charleston, SC
3:00 p.m. ET	Suzuka Yosue 7', 49'; Kristi Jones 19'; Zoey Conrad (yellow card) 43'	Report		Stadium: WLI Field; Attendance: 176; Referee: Brandon Marion; Assistant referees: Carmen Serbio; Bryson Condrey; Fourth official: Brandon Ingram

October 25	#8 Wofford	2–1	#9 Furman	Spartanburg, SC
7:00 p.m. ET	Megan Childress 17'; Mia Bookhard 18'	Report	85' Helen Gutierrez	Stadium: Snyder Field; Attendance: 250; Referee: Alyssa Nichols; Assistant referees: Justin Howard; Joshua Belle; Fourth official: Khadime Sabara

=== Quarterfinals ===
October 28	#2 Samford	2–0	#7 The Citadel	Homewood, AL
2:30 p.m. ET	Whitaker Buchanan 5'; Ella Simpson 7'; Mary Raymond (yellow card) 82'	Report	(yellow card) 82' Lexy Kendro	Stadium: Samford Track and Soccer Stadium; Attendance: 353

October 28	#4 UNC Greensboro	2–1	#5 Western Carolina	Chattanooga, TN
4:00 p.m. ET	Caroline Woods 20'; Maddy Gihool 50'	Report	(yellow card) 45' Shannon Greenwood; 77' Maggie Lloyd	Stadium: UTC Sports Complex; Attendance: 153; Referee: Nicole Green; Assistant referees: Kiah Haslett; Noah Kenyawani; Fourth official: Patrick Lima

October 28	#3 Mercer	1–1 (a.e.t.) (3–2 p)	#6 ETSU	Homewood, AL
5:00 p.m. ET	Chandler Lewis-Jenkins 27'; Jada Moorman (yellow card) 102'	Report	(yellow card) 28' Selena Wimbish; 67' Andjela Kricak; (yellow card) 95' Sinoxolo Cesane; (yellow card) 101' Sydney Somogyi	Stadium: Samford Track and Soccer Stadium; Attendance: 211
	Penalties
	Kendall Cook (penalty scored); Pace Stephenson (penalty missed); Nicole Icen (penalty scored); Lana Whitfeld (penalty scored)		(penalty missed) Sydney Somogyi; (penalty scored) Taylor Limprevil; (penalty missed) Ellie Cornell; (penalty scored) Natalie Capanelli; (penalty missed) Andjela Kricak

October 28	#1 Chattanooga	2–1	#8 Wofford	Chattanooga, TN
6:30 p.m. ET	Caroline Richvalsky 15'; Birna Johannsdottir 67'	Report	(yellow card) 74' Addie Marlett; 88' Lexi Reichenbach	Stadium: UTC Sports Complex; Attendance: 437; Referee: Eric Usher; Assistant referees: Carmen Anthony; Bryson Condrey; Fourth official: Patrick Lama

=== Semifinals ===
October 30	#2 Samford	1–0	#3 Mercer	Homewood, AL
12:00 p.m. ET	Whitaker Buchanan 7'	Report		Stadium: Samford Track and Soccer Stadium; Attendance: 374; Referee: Guido Gonzales; Assistant referees: Khadime Sabara; James Sherer

October 30	#1 Chattanooga	1–2 (a.e.t.)	#4 UNC Greensboro	Chattanooga, TN
2:00 p.m. ET	Caroline Richvalsky 66'	Report	13' Gabi Santora; 97' Maddy Gihool	Stadium: UTC Sports Complex; Attendance: 290; Referee: Kiah Haslett; Assistant referees: Lucy Bell; Matthew Bell; Fourth official: Tark Veledar

=== Final ===
November 6	#2 Samford	0–0 (a.e.t.) (6–5 p)	#4 UNC Greensboro	Homewood, AL
1:00 p.m. CT	Nikki Bario (yellow card) 22'; Layton Glisson (yellow card) 103'; Caroline Donovan (yellow card) 107'	Report	(yellow card) 3' Emma Malone; (yellow card) 33' Team	Stadium: Samford Track and Soccer Stadium; Attendance: 528
	Penalties
	Lindsay Origliasso (penalty missed); Lindsay Worthington (penalty missed); Layton Glisson (penalty scored); Whitaker Buchanan (penalty scored); Adleigh Wheeler (penalty missed); Taylor Yount (penalty scored); Ella Simpson (penalty scored); Kylie Gazza (penalty scored); Caroline Donovan (penalty scored)		(penalty missed) Gabi Santora; (penalty scored) Eliza Radoll; (penalty missed) Parker Sikora; (penalty scored) Morgan Brubaker; (penalty missed) Maddy Gihool; (penalty scored) Dalani Stephens; (penalty scored) Caroline Woods; (penalty scored) Taylor Mentzer; (penalty missed) Hannah Morton

== Statistics ==
=== Goalscorers ===
There were 20 goals scored in 9 matches, for an average of 2.22 goals per match (as of November 6, 2022).

2 goals

- Caroline Richvalsky – Chattanooga
- Suzuka Yosue – The Citadel
- Whitaker Buchanan – Samford
- Maddy Gihool – UNC Greensboro

1 goal

- Birna Johannsdottir – Chattanooga
- Andjela Kricak – ETSU
- Helen Gutierrez – Furman
- Chandler Lewis-Jenkins – Mercer
- Krisit Jones – The Citadel
- Ella Simpson – Samford
- Maggie Lloyd – Western Carolina
- Mia Bookhard – Wofford
- Megan Childress – Wofford
- Lexi Reichenbach – Wofford
- Gabi Santora – UNC Greensboro
- Caroline Woods – UNC Greensboro

== All-Tournament team ==
Player	Team
Grace Duncan	The Citadel
Sydney Somogyi	ETSU
Helen Gutierrez	Furman
Lindsay Bell	Mercer
Jamie Hlebec	Mercer
Dalani Stephens	UNC Greensboro
Eliza Radoll	UNC Greensboro
Maddy Gihool	UNC Greensboro
**Emma Donley**	Samford
Caroline Donovan	Samford
Ella Simpson	Samford
Whitaker Buchanan	Samford
Shelby Hash	Chattanooga
Caroline Richvalsky	Chattanooga
Jillian Hall	VMI
Kaityln Galbraith	Western Carolina
Lexi Reichenbach	Wofford

MVP in bold
