= 2023 Southern Conference women's soccer tournament =

- Classification: Division I
- Teams: 10
- Matches: 9
- Attendance: 5,025
- Site: Campus Sites (#7 & #8 seed - First Round); Campus Sites (#1 & #2 seeds - Quarterfinals & Semifinals); Campus Sites (#1 seed - Final)
- Champions: Western Carolina (3rd title)
- Winning coach: Chad Miller (1st title)
- MVP: Paige McAra (Western Carolina)
- Broadcast: ESPN+

2023 Southern Conference women's soccer standings
	Conf.						Overall
Team	W		L		T	PCT	W		L		T	PCT
Western Carolina ‍†‍‡‍^{y}	7	–	2	–	0	.778	13	–	5	–	3	.690
Samford ‍‍‍	6	–	1	–	2	.778	12	–	4	–	5	.690
East Tennessee State ‍‍‍	6	–	1	–	2	.778	11	–	3	–	5	.711
Furman ‍‍‍	3	–	1	–	5	.611	7	–	5	–	7	.553
Mercer ‍‍‍	4	–	4	–	1	.500	10	–	6	–	5	.595
Chattanooga ‍‍‍	4	–	4	–	1	.500	10	–	7	–	1	.583
UNC Greensboro ‍‍‍	4	–	4	–	1	.500	7	–	9	–	3	.447
Wofford ‍‍‍	2	–	5	–	2	.333	5	–	11	–	4	.350
VMI ‍‍‍	1	–	8	–	0	.111	2	–	17	–	0	.105
The Citadel ‍‍‍	0	–	7	–	2	.111	3	–	9	–	6	.333
† – Conference champion ‡ – 2023 SoCON Tournament champion y – Invited to the NCAA Tournament; As of December 5, 2023; Rankings from United Soccer Coaches Poll; Source: SoCon

The 2023 Southern Conference women's soccer tournament was the postseason women's soccer tournament for the Southern Conference held from October 24 through November 5, 2023. The tournament was held at campus sites, with the higher seed hosting. The ten-team single-elimination tournament consisted of four rounds based on seeding from regular season conference play. The Samford Bulldogs were the defending champions. Samford was not successful in their title defense. They reached the final but fell 1–0 to Western Carolina. This was the third Southern Conference tournament title for the Western Carolina women's soccer program and first for head coach Chad Miller. The tournament title was Western Carolina's first since 2008. As tournament champions, Western Carolina earned the Southern Conference's automatic berth into the 2023 NCAA Division I Women's Soccer Tournament.

== Seeding ==
All ten teams from the regular season qualified for the 2023 Tournament. Seeding was based on regular season records of each team. A tiebreaker was required to determine the second and third seeds of the tournament after East Tennessee State and Samford tied with identical 6–1–2 regular season records. The two teams tied their regular season meeting 1–1. East Tennessee State won the second tiebreaker and was awarded the second seed. A second tiebreaker was required to determine the fifth through seventh seeds as Chattanooga, Mercer, and UNC Greensboro all finished with identical 4–4–1 conference records. The three teams records against each other was considered as the tiebreaker. UNC Greensboro came out on top as they defeated Chattanooga and tied with Mercer. Chattanooga was the sixth seed as they defeated Mercer but lost to UNC Greensboro. Mercer was the seventh seed as they lost to Chattanooga and tied UNC Greensboro.

Seed	School	Conference Record	Points
1	Western Carolina	7–2–0	21
2	East Tennessee State	6–1–2	20
3	Samford	6–1–2	20
4	Furman	3–1–5	14
5	UNC Greensboro	4–4–1	13
6	Chattanooga	4–4–1	13
7	Mercer	4–4–1	13
8	Wofford	2–5–2	8
9	VMI	1–8–0	3
10	The Citadel	0–7–2	2

== Bracket ==
First round Tuesday, October 24
8	Wofford	2
9	VMI	1
7	Mercer	1
10	The Citadel	0

Quarterfinals; Friday, October 27
1	Western Carolina	5
8	Wofford	0
4	Furman (pen.)	2 (3)
5	UNC Greensboro	2 (1)
2	East Tennessee State	1
7	Mercer	0
3	Samford (a.e.t.)	3
6	Chattanooga	2

Semifinals; Sunday, October 29
1	Western Carolina	1
4	Furman	0
2	East Tennessee State	0
3	Samford	2

Championship; Sunday, November 5
1	Western Carolina	1
3	Samford	0

== Schedule ==
=== First round ===
October 24	#8 Wofford	2–1	#9 VMI	Spartanburg, SC
6:00 p.m. ET	Bailey Mullen (yellow card) 54', (goal) 66'; Megan Childress 66'	Report	27' Barrett Callejo	Stadium: Snyder Field; Attendance: 145; Referee: Brandon Marion; Assistant referees: Marcus Moss; Josh Lampkins; Fourth official: John Rush

October 24	#7 Mercer	1–0	#10 The Citadel	Macon, GA
7:30 p.m. ET	Lena Dykes 21'; Lana Whitfield (yellow card) 81'	Report	(yellow card) 81' Grace Duncan	Stadium: Betts Stadium; Attendance: 303; Referee: Amin Hadzic; Assistant referees: Khadime Sabara; Thomas Brigman; Fourth official: Derek Ambrozaitis

=== Quarterfinals ===
October 27	#4 Furman	2–2 (a.e.t.) (3–1 p)	#5 UNC Greensboro	Cullowhee, NC
4:00 p.m. ET	Maddie Massie 24'; Ashlyn Goila 41'	Report	55', 76', (yellow card) 78' Taylor Mentzer	Stadium: Catamount Soccer Complex; Referee: John Rush; Assistant referees: Joshua Lampkins; Tarver Pyke; Fourth official: Ben Ellis
	Penalties
	Hannah Farr (penalty missed); Helen Gutierrez (penalty scored); Valentina Mosquera (penalty scored); Ashlyn Golia (penalty missed); Shania Diaz (penalty scored)		(penalty missed) Taylor Mentzer; (penalty missed) Caroline Woods; (penalty scored) Dalani Stephens; (penalty missed) Natalie McCullough

October 27	#2 East Tennessee State	1–0	#7 Mercer	Johnson City, TN
4:00 p.m. ET	Sinoxolo Cesane 7'; Lindsey Cook (yellow card) 41'	Report	(yellow card) 85' Jamie Hlebec	Stadium: Summers-Taylor Stadium; Attendance: 701; Referee: Madzid Coric; Assistant referees: Khadime Sabara; Thomas Rutherford; Fourth official: Patrick Loma

October 27	#1 Western Carolina	5–0	#8 Wofford	Cullowhee, NC
7:00 p.m. ET	Alexis DeMarco 28'; Kirsten Hahn 30'; Wofford Own Goal 35'; Sophie Burchfield 44'; Ava Robitaille 78'	Report		Stadium: Catamount Soccer Complex; Attendance: 892; Referee: Matthew Bell; Assistant referees: Carmen Anthony Serbio; Ben Ellis; Fourth official: John Matto

October 27	#3 Samford	3–2 (a.e.t.)	#6 Chattanooga	Johnson City, TN
7:00 p.m. ET	Layton Glisson 44'; Team (yellow card) 77'; Ella Simpson 81'; Mary Raymond 107'	Report	5', 40' Birna Johannsdottir; (yellow card) 44' Team; (yellow card) 56' Caroline Richvalsky; (yellow card) 67' Team	Stadium: Summers-Taylor Stadium

=== Semifinals ===
October 29	#1 Western Carolina	1–0	#4 Furman	Cullowhee, NC
1:00 p.m. ET	Mackenzie Megill 78'	Report		Stadium: Catamount Soccer Complex; Attendance: 693; Referee: Kevin Maurer; Assistant referees: Robert Dail; Thomas Rutherford; Fourth official: Eric Usher

October 29	#2 East Tennessee State	0–2	#3 Samford	Johnson City, TN
1:00 p.m. ET		Report	21', (yellow card) 63' Mia Wehby; 59' Kyla Reynolds; (yellow card) 89' Alyssa Conarton	Stadium: Summers-Taylor Stadium; Attendance: 902

=== Final ===
November 5	#1 Western Carolina	1–0	#3 Samford	Cullowhee, NC
2:00 p.m. ET	Naya Marcil 11'	Report	(yellow card) 42' Kaitlin Maynard; (yellow card) 69' Mia Wehby; (yellow card) 87' Hanna Himes	Stadium: Catamount Soccer Complex; Attendance: 1,389; Referee: Nicole Green; Assistant referees: Joshua Belk; Tarver Pyke; Fourth official: Joe Kirkpatrick

== Statistics ==
=== Goalscorers ===
There were 23 goals scored in 9 matches, for an average of 2.56 goals per match (as of November 5, 2023).

2 goals

- Birna Johannsdottir – Chattanooga
- Taylor Mentzer – UNC Greensboro

1 goal

- Sinoxolo Cesane – East Tennessee State
- Ashlyn Goila – Furman
- Maddie Massie – Furman
- Lena Dykes – Mercer
- Layton Glisson – Samford
- Mary Raymond – Samford
- Kyla Reynolds – Samford
- Ella Simpson – Samford
- Mia Wehby – Samford
- Barrett Callejo – VMI
- Sophie Burchfield – Western Carolina
- Alexis DeMarco – Western Carolina
- Kirsten Hahn – Western Carolina
- Naya Marcil – Western Carolina
- Mackenzie Megill – Western Carolina
- Ava Robitaille – Western Carolina
- Megan Childress – Wofford
- Bailey Mullen – Wofford

1 own goal

- Wofford (vs Western Carolina)

== All-Tournament team ==
Player	Team
Grace Duncan	The Citadel
Grace Eatz	East Tennessee State
Madi Hook	East Tennessee State
Camryn Bolick	Furman
Addison Corn	Furman
Jamie Hlebec	Mercer
Taylor Mentzer	UNC Greensboro
Lindsay Origliasso	Samford
Mary Raymond	Samford
Jennifer Seward	Samford
Birna Johannsdottir	Chattanooga
Barrett Callejo	VMI
Alexis DeMarco	Western Carolina
Naya Marcil	Western Carolina
**Paige McAra**	Western Carolina
Ava Robitaille	Western Carolina
Meara Kelly	Wofford

MVP in bold
