= 2025 Southern Conference women's soccer tournament =

- Classification: Division I
- Teams: 10
- Matches: 9
- Attendance: 4,092
- Site: Campus Sites (#7 & #8 seed - First Round); Campus Sites (#1 & #2 seeds - Quarterfinals & Semifinals); Campus Sites (#1 seed - Final)
- Champions: Samford Bulldogs (7th title)
- Winning coach: Todd Yelton (7th title)
- MVP: Samantha De Luca (Samford Bulldogs)
- Broadcast: ESPN+

2025 Southern Conference women's soccer standings
	Conf.						Overall
Team	W		L		T	PCT	W		L		T	PCT
Samford ‍†‍‡‍^{y}	7	–	0	–	2	.889	13	–	3	–	5	.738
Western Carolina ‍‍‍	5	–	2	–	2	.667	10	–	6	–	4	.600
ETSU ‍‍‍	4	–	1	–	4	.667	9	–	4	–	6	.632
Chattanooga ‍‍‍	4	–	2	–	3	.611	10	–	5	–	4	.632
Furman ‍‍‍	3	–	2	–	4	.556	10	–	4	–	5	.658
Mercer ‍‍‍	3	–	3	–	3	.500	10	–	7	–	3	.575
UNC Greensboro ‍‍‍	2	–	4	–	3	.389	4	–	12	–	3	.289
Wofford ‍‍‍	2	–	4	–	3	.389	6	–	9	–	6	.429
The Citadel ‍‍‍	2	–	5	–	2	.333	5	–	9	–	3	.382
VMI ‍‍‍	0	–	9	–	0	.000	2	–	17	–	1	.125
† – Conference champion ‡ – 2025 SoCON Tournament champion y – Invited to the NCAA Tournament; As of December 9, 2025; Rankings from United Soccer Coaches Poll; Source:SoCon

The 2025 Southern Conference women's soccer tournament was the postseason women's soccer tournament for the Southern Conference held from October 28 through November 9, 2025. The tournament was held at campus sites, with the higher seed hosting. The ten-team single-elimination tournament consisted of four rounds based on seeding from regular season conference play. The Samford Bulldogs were the defending champions. Samford successfully defended their title after winning the regular season title and earning the top seed for the tournament. They defeated sixth-seed Mercer 4–1 in the Final. This was the seventh Southern Conference tournament title for the Samford women's soccer program, all of which have come under head coach Todd Yelton. Samford has won four of the last five SoCon Tournaments. As tournament champions, Samford earned the Southern Conference's automatic berth into the 2025 NCAA Division I women's soccer tournament.

== Seeding ==
All ten teams who sponsored women's soccer in the Southern Conference qualified for the 2025 Tournament. Seeding was based on regular season records of each team. A tiebreaker was required for the seventh and eighth seeds as UNC Greensboro and Wofford finished the regular season with identical 2–4–3 conference records and on nine points. The two teams tied their regular season matchup 0–0 on October 5. UNC Greensboro won the tiebreaker and earned the seventh seed, while Wofford was the eighth seed.

Seed	School	Conference Record	Points
1	Samford	7–0–2	23
2	Western Carolina	5–2–2	17
3	East Tennessee State	4–1–4	16
4	Chattanooga	4–2–3	15
5	Furman	3–2–4	13
6	Mercer	3–3–3	12
7	UNC Greensboro	2–4–3	9
8	Wofford	2–4–3	9
9	The Citadel	2–5–2	8
10	VMI	0–9–0	0

== Bracket ==
First round Tuesday, October 28
8	Wofford	2
9	The Citadel	0
7	UNC Greensboro	2
10	VMI	0

Quarterfinals; Friday, October 31
1	Samford	2
8	Wofford	1
4	Chattanooga	1
5	Furman (OT)	2
2	Western Carolina (OT)	4
7	UNC Greensboro	3
3	East Tennessee State	1
6	Mercer	2

Semifinals; Sunday, November 2
1	Samford (2OT)	3
5	Furman	2
2	Western Carolina	0
6	Mercer (2OT)	1

Championship; Sunday, November 9
1	Samford	4
6	Mercer	1

== Schedule ==
=== First round ===
October 28	(7) UNC Greensboro	2–0	(10) VMI	Greensboro, NC
6:00 p.m. EDT	Ava Kiss 32'; Taylor Mentzer 55' (pen.)	Report		Stadium: UNCG Soccer Stadium; Attendance: 93; Referee: Kevin Maurer; Assistant referees: Robert Dail; Marcua Moss; Fourth official: Jordan Castillejo

October 28	(8) Wofford	2–1	(9) The Citadel	Spartanburg, SC
6:00 p.m. EDT	Ines Obradovac 16'; Ellie Gower 56'	Report	(yellow card) 43' Gabrielle Macer; 68' Samantha Grantham	Stadium: Snyder Field; Attendance: 156

=== Quarterfinals ===
October 31	(3) East Tennessee State	1–2	(6) Mercer	Cullowhee, NC
4:00 p.m. EDT	Grace Eatz 65'	Report	Maggie Rollins 23'; Maria Karipidis 83'	Stadium: Catamount Soccer Complex; Attendance: 121; Referee: Khadime Sabara; Assistant referees: Justin Howard; Albert Kyei-Mensah; Fourth official: Raymond Moffatte

October 31	(1) Samford	2–0	(8) Wofford	Homewood, AL
4:00 p.m. CDT	Anne McBride 38'; Samantha De Luca 79' (pen.)	Report	(red card) 79' Carson DeMars	Stadium: Samford Track and Soccer Stadium; Attendance: 317; Referee: Dorian Del Toro; Assistant referees: Ryan Starr; Christopher Hagerty; Fourth official: Kyle Johnston

October 31	(4) Chattanooga	1–2 (a.e.t.)	(5) Furman	Cullowhee, NC
7:00 p.m. EDT	Caroline Richvalsky (yellow card) 40'; Paige Thomas 84'	Report	(yellow card) 72' Briyah Drayton; 86', 91' Norah Roller	Stadium: Catamount Soccer Complex; Attendance: 211

October 31	(2) Western Carolina	4–3 (a.e.t.)	(7) UNC Greensboro	Homewood, AL
7:00 p.m. CDT	Isabella DeMarco 2', 30', 99'; Gabriela Vatrano 86'	Report	35' (pen.) Rina Ogimoto; 46' Merle Greulich; 68' Ava Kiss	Stadium: Samford Track and Soccer Stadium; Attendance: 327; Referee: Donovan Eubank; Assistant referees: Amy Balbier; Adonis Alawar; Fourth official: Raymond Mofatte

=== Semifinals ===
November 2	(1) Samford	3–2 (a.e.t.)	(5) Furman	Homewood, AL
1:00 p.m. CST	Becca Koenig 29'; Langston Lilly (yellow card) 45'; Samantha De Luca 53'; Martha Bishop (yellow card) 75'; Alex Parr (yellow card) 87' (yellow-red card) 97'; Caroline Smith 107' (pen.)	Report	56' Katelyn Nixon; (yellow card) 64', (goal) 73' Ellie Herrmann; (yellow card) 74' Briyah Dratyon; (yellow card) 75' Alyssa England	Stadium: Samford Track and Soccer Stadium; Attendance: 521

November 2	(2) Western Carolina	0–1 (a.e.t.)	(6) Mercer	Cullowhee, NC
2:00 p.m. EST	Mary Mueth (yellow card) 50'; Ava Robitaille (yellow card) 54'; Team (yellow card) 66'	Report	(yellow card) 83' Sydney Farr; 109' (pen.) Morganne Eikelbarner	Stadium: Catamount Soccer Complex; Attendance: 623; Referee: Nicole Green; Assistant referees: Justin Howard; Adonis Alawar; Fourth official: John Bouda

=== Final ===
November 9	(1) Samford	4–1	(6) Mercer	Homewood, AL
1:00 p.m. CST	Langston Lilly 22', 71'; Clare Nicholas 46', (yellow card) 56'; Samantha De Luca 60'; Brooklyn Miller (yellow card) 80'	Report	2' Morganne Eikelbarner	Stadium: Samford Track and Soccer Stadium; Attendance: 1,723

== Statistics ==
=== Goalscorers ===
There were 31 goals scored in 9 matches, for an average of 3.44 goals per match (as of November 9, 2025).

3 goals

- Samantha De Luca – Samford
- Isabella DeMarco – Western Carolina

2 goals

- Norah Roller – Furman
- Morganne Eikelbarner – Mercer
- Langston Lilly – Samford
- Ava Kiss – UNC Greensboro

1 goal

- Paige Thomas – Chattanooga
- Grace Eatz – East Tennessee State
- Ellie Herrmann – Furman
- Katelyn Nixon – Furman
- Maria Karipidis – Mercer
- Maggie Rollins – Mercer
- Becca Koenig – Samford
- Clare Nicholas – Samford
- Anne McBride – Samford
- Caroline Smith – Samford
- Samantha Grantham – The Citadel
- Merle Greulich – UNC Greensboro
- Taylor Mentzer – UNC Greensboro
- Rina Ogimoto – UNC Greensboro
- Gabriela Vatrano – Western Carolina
- Ellie Gower – Wofford
- Ines Obradovac – Wofford

== All-Tournament team ==
Player	Team
Samantha Grantham	The Citadel
Grace Eatz	East Tennessee State
Katie Bengough	Furman
Ava King	Furman
Morganne Eikelbarner	Mercer
Sydney Farr	Mercer
Maggie Rollins	Mercer
Ava Kiss	UNC Greensboro
Martha Bishop	Samford
**Samantha De Luca**	Samford
Hanna Rae Himes	Samford
Avery Stevens	Samford
Caroline Richvalsky	Chattanooga
Mackenzie Hobik	VMI
Isabella DeMarco	Western Carolina
Abbie Wise	Western Carolina
Ellie Gower	Wofford

MVP in bold
