= 2018 Presbyterian Blue Hose women's soccer team =

American college soccer season

2018 Presbyterian Blue Hose women's soccer
- Conference: Big South Conference
- Record: 5–1 (0–0 Big South)
- Head coach: Brian Purcell (30th season)
- Assistant coach: Tanner Osborne (3rd season)
- Home stadium: Edens Field at Martin Stadium

The 2018 Presbyterian Blue Hose women's soccer team represented Presbyterian College during the 2018 NCAA Division I women's soccer season. This season was the 30th in program history. The Blue Hose played their home games at Martin Stadium in Clinton.

== Previous season ==
In 2017, the Blue Hose finished the season 3–13, 1–8 in Big South play.

== Roster ==
2018 Presbyterian Blue Hose women's soccer
Goalkeepers: 0 Megan Serrano – Freshman; 1 Alyssa Leaman – Freshman; Defenders: 3 Elayne Benson – Freshman; 5 Tara Brophy – Sophomore; 10 Taylor Coleman – Freshman; 11 Emily LaBoon – Freshman; 15 Emma Shaw – Junior; 16 Kristen Bane – Sophomore; 18 Jessica Newton – Freshman; 25 Kelsey Yeager – Senior	Midfielders: 4 Preston Robinette – Sophomore; 6 Isabelle Russell – Sophomore; 7 Jessica Escobar – Freshman; 8 Peyton Patterson – Sophomore; 14 Jessica Powell – Sophomore; 19 Emma Gray – Junior; 22 Caroline Dipzinski – Freshman; 27 Haley Hocking – Freshman; Forwards: 2 Megan Archer – Senior; 9 Samantha Britt – Sophomore; 12 Mallory Hopkins – Senior; 17 Morgan Hutchison – Sophomore; 21 Samantha Fink – Junior; 24 Kori Lawrence – Freshman

== Schedule ==
Date Time, TV	Opponent	Result	Record	Site City, State
Non-conference regular season
August 23; 7:00 p.m.	Furman	L 0–1	0–1	Martin Stadium (310); Clinton, SC
August 26; 7:00 p.m.	The Citadel	W 4–2	1–1	Martin Stadium (122); Clinton, SC
August 31; 7:00 p.m.	Alabama State	W 3–1	2–1	Martin Stadium (115); Clinton, SC
September 2; 7:00 p.m.	at Mercer	W 2–1	3–1	Betts Stadium (204); Macon, GA
September 5; 7:00 p.m.	at South Carolina State	W 4–0	4–1	O.C. Dawson Stadium (153); Orangeburg, SC
September 9; 2:00 p.m.	at Wofford	W 3–1	5–1	Snyder Field (325); Spartanburg, SC
Big South regular season
September 15; 6:00 p.m.	Winthrop			Martin Stadium; Clinton, SC
*Non-conference game. ^{#}Rankings from United Soccer Coaches. (#) Tournament seedings in parentheses.
