= Alyssa Frazier =

American soccer player (born 1998)

Personal information
- Full name: Alyssa Kaye Frazier
- Date of birth: September 10, 1998 (age 28)
- Height: 5 ft 6 in (1.68 m)
- Position: Midfielder

Youth career
- St. Louis Scott Gallagher

College career
Years	Team	Apps	(Gls)
2017	Ole Miss Rebels	5	(1)
2018–2021	Samford Bulldogs	76	(17)

Senior career*
Years	Team	Apps	(Gls)
2022	Asheville City SC	12	(2)
2022	RIK Karlskoga	12	(1)
2023	Sparta Prague	2	(0)
2023	AP Orlen Gdańsk	5	(1)
2024–2025	Lexington SC	2	(0)
2025–2026	AP Orlen Gdańsk	12	(0)
- * Club domestic league appearances and goals as of 22:01, June 14, 2026 (UTC)

Alyssa Kaye Frazier (born September 10, 1998) is an American professional soccer player who plays as a midfielder. She played college soccer for the Ole Miss Rebels and the Samford Bulldogs. She has previously been a member of USL W League club Asheville City SC, Swedish Elitettan club RIK Karlskoga, Czech Women's First League club AC Sparta Prague, USL Super League club Lexington SC and Ekstraliga side AP Orlen Gdańsk.

== Early life ==
Frazier grew up in Towanda, Illinois, as one of three children born to Jill and Tom Frazier. She attended Normal Community High School, where she was an offensive threat from the midfield and earned three first-team all-conference honors. She was also a two-time all-state honoree and helped Normal High reach a regional championship in her junior year. In her final two seasons of prep soccer, she was the team's MVP and team captain. Outside of school, Frazier played club soccer for St. Louis Scott Gallagher SC.

== College career ==
=== Ole Miss Rebels ===
On August 18, 2017, Frazier made her collegiate debut with the Ole Miss Rebels, scoring once against Alabama State. She went on to appear only four more times for the Rebels, totaling 110 minutes in one season. Ahead of the 2018 campaign, Frazier transferred from Ole Miss to Samford University.

=== Samford Bulldogs ===
Frazier spent four years (including a graduate year) with the Samford Bulldogs. She played in all of the Bulldogs' matches within that timeframe, starting each game in her junior and fifth years. After an unremarkable sophomore season, she found her footing as a junior in 2019, earning her first of three consecutive All-Southern Conference (SoCon) first team honors. She scored the lone goal against Furman in the 2019 Southern Conference tournament, lifting Samford to its third SoCon title in program history. As a senior in 2020, Frazier recorded three goals and three assists through a season that had been shortened due to the COVID-19 pandemic. She helped the Bulldogs reach the SoCon tournament final yet again, but had to sit out the majority of the championship match after injuring her hip flexor.

In the fall of 2021, Frazier returned to Samford as a fifth-year player, taking advantage of the extra year of NCAA eligibility offered to students post-pandemic. She went on to tally a career-high eight goals and ten assists en route to her final all-SoCon first team honor. In August 2021, she scored a goal against UAB that earned fourth place on that week's edition of SportsCenter's Top 10 Sports Plays. Samford went on to reach the Round of 16 of the NCAA tournament, were they were eliminated by St. John's on penalties. Frazier departed from the program having scored 17 goals in 76 appearances and with four straight SoCon regular season titles under her belt.

== Club career ==
Frazier took a brief pause from playing after graduating from college, instead undergoing a double hip surgery to fix a long-term femoroacetabular impingement injury that had been plaguing her since high school. She then signed for pre-professional club Asheville City SC for the inaugural USL W League season and ended up recording two goals and four assists in 12 matches for the team.

In July 2022, eight months after her surgery, Frazier signed her first professional contract with Swedish Elitettan club RIK Karlskoga on a four-month deal. She became the second-ever Samford Bulldog in history (after Jermaine Seoposenwe) to play professionally. On August 6, 2022, Frazier made her pro debut in a defeat to Lidköpings FK. She made 12 appearances for Karlskoga as the team failed to escape relegation to the Swedish third division.

On January 15, 2023, Czech side AC Sparta Prague announced the signing of Frazier. Frazier made only two league appearances for Sparta Prague before departing shortly thereafter.

Later that year, Frazier joined Polish club AP Orlen Gdańsk. She scored one goal in five Ekstraliga matches in her first season in Poland.

On June 21, 2024, Lexington SC announced that they had signed Frazier ahead of the inaugural USL Super League season. Frazier made her Super League debut in Lexington SC's first-ever match, coming on as a second-half substitute for Autumn Weeks in a 1–1 draw with the Carolina Ascent. She made only one further appearance for Lexington before her contract was terminated in March 2025.

After less than a year away from Poland, Frazier re-joined AP Orlen Gdańsk on a deal lasting through the 2025–26 season. She was released by the club in July 2026, having made 12 league appearances during her second stint with AP Orlen.

== Honors and awards ==
=== Samford Bulldogs ===
- Southern Conference: 2018, 2019, 2020, 2021
- Southern Conference women's soccer tournament: 2019, 2021

=== Individual ===
- First-team all-Southern Conference: 2019, 2020, 2021
