= Gerald Harp =

Former American football tight end

Personal information
- Listed height: 5 ft 9 in (1.75 m)
- Listed weight: 179 lb (81 kg)

Career information
- High school: Lakeshore (GA)
- College: Western Carolina (1977–1980)

Gerald Harp (born c. 1959) is a former American football wide receiver. He played college football for the Western Carolina Catamounts from 1977 to 1980. He played high school football at Lakeshore High School in Atlanta. At five feet, seven inches tall and 155 pounds, he played at running back in high school. He grew to five feet, eight or nine inches by the time of his senior year at Western Carolina. At Western Carolina, he ranked among the leading receivers in major-college football for three consecutive years, finishing second nationally in 1978 with 62 receptions, fifth in 1979 with 57 receptions, and seventh in 1980 with 55 receptions. He also ranked among the national leaders with 1,145 receiving yards in 1978 (second nationally) and 1,009 receiving yards in 1979 (third nationally). At the end of his college career, Harp ranked third in career receptions and fourth in career receiving yardage. He played professional football for the Virginia Hunters in 1981.
