= Stephanie McCormick =

American basketball coach

Biographical details
- Born: 1972 (age 53–54); High Point, North Carolina
- Education: Catawba

Coaching career (HC unless noted)
- 1994–1997: Western Carolina (assistant)
- 1997–2001: UNC Wilmington (assistant)
- 2001–2003: UNC Charlotte (assistant)
- 2003–2004: Georgia Tech (assistant)
- 2004–2009: Western Carolina (assistant)
- 2009–2013: North Carolina State University (assistant)
- 2013–2015: Siena College (assistant)
- 2015–2019: Western Carolina

Head coaching record
- Overall: 23–94

Stephanie McCormick is the former head women's college basketball coach for the Western Carolina Catamounts. She replaced head coach Karen Middleton prior to the 2015–2016 season.

== Playing history ==
Born in High Point, North Carolina, McCormick attended Catawba College in Salisbury. She was the first player in school history to obtain both 1,000 career points and rebounds, and she holds Catawba's school record for both career (1,244) and single season rebounds (374). In 1994, she graduated with a bachelor of arts degree. In 2013, she was inducted into the Catawba College Sports Hall of Fame.

== Coaching history ==
McCormick went on to begin her coaching career, mostly as an assistant, at Western Carolina (1994–97, 2004–09), UNC Wilmington (1997–2001), UNC Charlotte (2001–03), Georgia Tech (2003–04), North Carolina State University (2009–13), and Siena College (2013–15). In April 2015, she was named the eleventh head coach for the Western Carolina women's basketball team, becoming the first African American coach in the school's athletic history.
