= Eleonora Goldoni =

Italian footballer (born 1996)

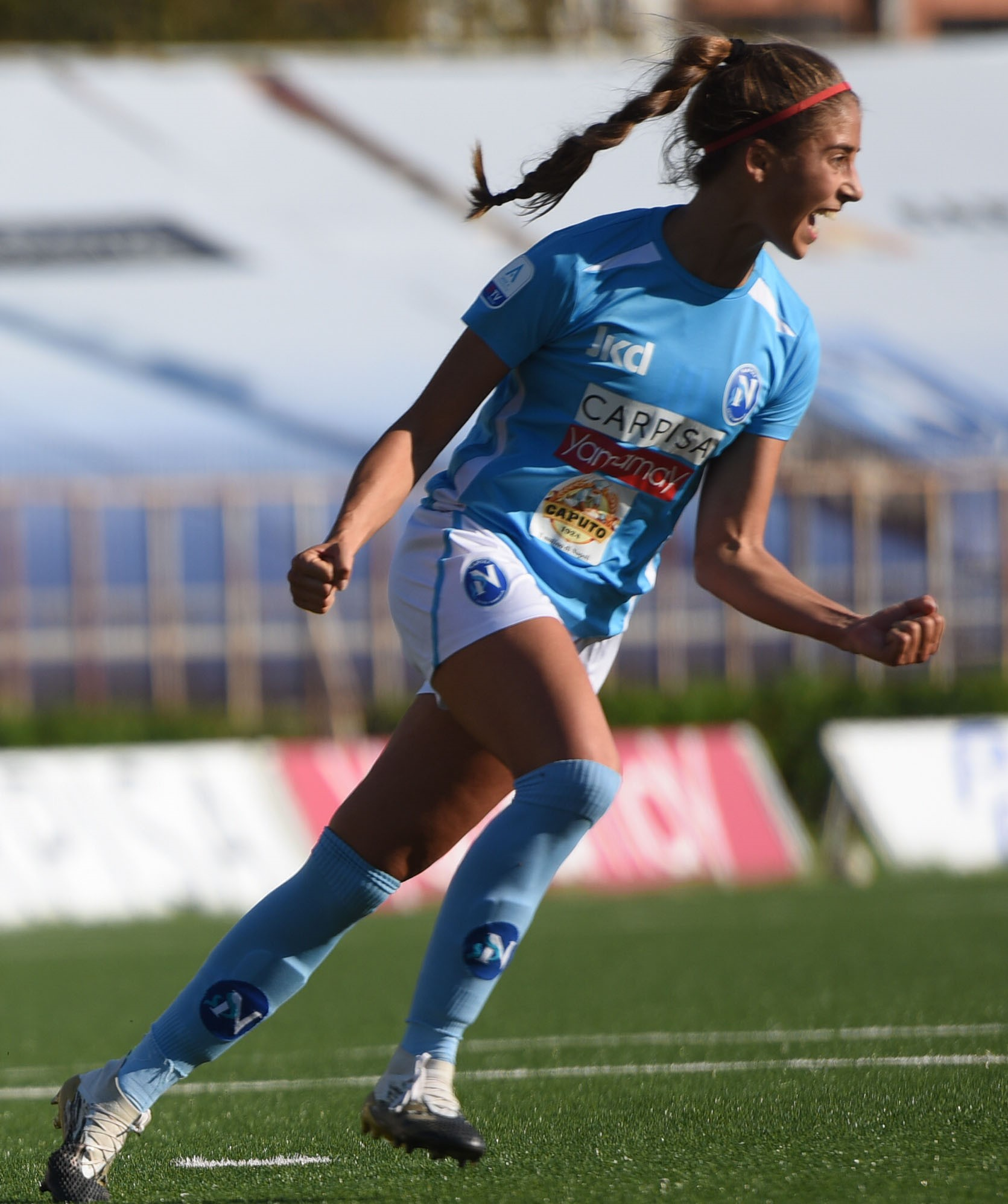
- Goldoni in 2020

Personal information
- Full name: Eleonora Maria Goldoni
- Date of birth: 16 February 1996 (age 30)
- Place of birth: Finale Emilia, Italy
- Height: 1.70 m (5 ft 7 in)
- Position: Forward

Team information
- Current team: Lazio
- Number: 25

College career
Years	Team	Apps	(Gls)
2015–2018	ETSU Buccaneers	63	(36)

Senior career*
Years	Team	Apps	(Gls)
2012–2015	New Team Ferrara	75	(54)
2019–2020	Inter Milan	8	(0)
2020–2022	Napoli	34	(7)
2022–2023	Sassuolo	9	(2)
2023–	Lazio	30	(6)

International career^{‡}
2013	Italy U17	6	(1)
2014–2015	Italy U19	7	(1)
2018–	Italy	6	(0)
- * Club domestic league appearances and goals as of 04:31, 8 December 2025 (UTC) ‡ National team caps and goals as of 00:10, 28 February 2020 (UTC)

Eleonora Maria Goldoni (born 16 February 1996) is an Italian professional footballer who plays as a forward for Lazio in the Serie A and has appeared for the Italy women's national team.

== Club career ==
On 5 July 2022, Goldoni joined Sassuolo.

== International career ==
Goldoni has been capped for the Italy national team, appearing for the team during the 2019 FIFA Women's World Cup qualifying cycle.

On 25 June 2025, Goldoni was called up to the Italy squad for the UEFA Women's Euro 2025.

== Career statistics ==
=== Club ===
As of match played 12 February 2023

Appearances and goals by club, season and competition
Club	Season	League			Cup (Note: Includes the Coppa Italia (women))		Other		Total	
Club	Season	Division	Apps	Goals	Apps	Goals	Apps	Goals	Apps	Goals
New Team Ferrara	2012–13	Serie C	26	22	5	2	1	0	32	24
New Team Ferrara	2013–14	Serie B	24	25	2	0	—		26	25
New Team Ferrara	2014–15	Serie B	25	7	2	0	—		31	23
New Team Ferrara	Total		75	54	9	2	1	0	85	56
Inter Milan	2019–20	Serie A	8	0	1	0	—		9	0
Napoli	2020–21	Serie A	15	2	1	1	—		16	3
Napoli	2021–22	Serie A	19	5	1	1	—		20	6
Napoli	Total		34	7	2	2	0	0	36	9
Sassuolo	2022–23	Serie A	9	2	0	0	—		9	2
Career total			126	63	12	4	1	0	139	67
