= Chattanooga Mocs =

- University: University of Tennessee at Chattanooga
- Nickname: Mocs
- NCAA: Division I (FCS)
- Conference: SoCon (primary); OVC (beach volleyball)
- Athletic director: Mark Wharton
- Location: Chattanooga, Tennessee
- Varsity teams: 16 (6 men's and 10 women's)
- Football stadium: Finley Stadium (football, soccer)
- Basketball arena: McKenzie Arena
- Softball stadium: Frost Stadium
- Volleyball arena: Maclellan Gymnasium
- Other venues: Maclellan Gymnasium
- Colors: Navy, old gold, and silver
- Mascot: Scrappy Moc
- Fight song: Fight Chattanooga
- Website: gomocs.com
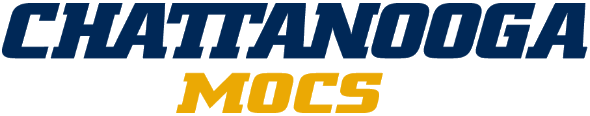

Team NCAA championships
- 4

Individual and relay NCAA champions
- 8

The Chattanooga Mocs (formerly the Chattanooga Moccasins) are the 16 teams representing the University of Tennessee at Chattanooga in intercollegiate athletics. The Mocs compete in the NCAA Division I Football Championship Subdivision (FCS) and are members of the Southern Conference (SoCon).

== Name ==
Moc is the shortened version of the original nickname, "Moccasins." It also refers to the northern mockingbird, Tennessee's state bird.

== Teams ==
A member of the Southern Conference, the University of Tennessee at Chattanooga currently sponsors teams in six men's and 10 women's NCAA sanctioned sports.

Men's sports	Women's sports
Basketball	Basketball
Cross Country	Beach volleyball
Football	Cross Country
Golf	Golf
Tennis	Soccer
Wrestling	Softball
	Tennis
	Track and field^{1}
	Volleyball
^{1}indoor and outdoor

Basketball

Chattanooga's men's basketball program has been among the best in the Southern Conference since joining the league in 1977–78. The Mocs have won 10 SoCon Tournament titles, tied for first all-time with former member West Virginia and Davidson, 10 regular-season league championships prior to the change to the division format in 1995 and seven division titles, for 27 total titles. In 1997, led by coach Mack McCarthy and Chattanooga native Johnny Taylor, the Mocs made a run to the Sweet 16 as a No. 14 seed, beating Georgia and Illinois before falling to Providence. Before making the move to Division I, Chattanooga won the Division II National Championship in 1977. In July 2008, the team was ranked number 48 on the ESPN list of the most prestigious basketball programs since the 1984–85 season.

The Mocs won the SoCon tournament once again in 2009. Defeating the College of Charleston Cougars 80–69 in the championship game on their home court at the McKenzie Arena, the Mocs punched their ticket to the NCAA tournament, their first since 2005.

Jimmy Fallon from Late Night with Jimmy Fallon chose the Mocs as his team of choice going into the 2009 NCAA tournament. The Wednesday night (March 18) show included a live Skype chat with Head Coach John Shulman, as well as representatives of the pep band and cheerleading squads made in studio. Fallon's house band The Roots wrote and performed an ode to Shulman titled, "The Don Juan of the SoCon" and Shulman and his six seniors (Nicchaeus Doaks, Zach Ferrell, Kevin Goffney, Khalil Hartwell, Stephen McDowell and Keyron Sheard) made an in-studio appearance following their tournament game with UConn.

The Lady Mocs are the most successful women's basketball program in Southern Conference history, with 15 regular season titles since 1983–1984, 10 consecutive conference championships at the end of 2008–2009, and 14 overall conference championships.

Golf

The men's golf squad won its third consecutive Southern Conference trophy and finished 18th in the NCAA Championships in 2009.

In August 2012, UTC golfer Steven Fox won the U.S. Amateur Championship.

Women's golf posted a 3.46 team GOA in the spring while advancing to the NCAA Division I finals in just the second year of the program since disbanding in the mid-1980s.

Softball

The Mocs’ softball team has won 11 regular season titles and 10 SoCon Tournament Championships. They have also made 7 NCAA tournament appearances.

Wrestling

Chattanooga is home to the only NCAA Division I wrestling program in the state of Tennessee. The Mocs' wrestling team has won 8 of the past 9 SoCon titles since the 2012–2013 academic year.

Football

The team plays in the Southern Conference (SoCon) in Division I FCS (formerly I-AA). Hall of Famer Terrell Owens played wide receiver for the Mocs from 1992 to 1995. The team won three straight SoCon championships from 2013 to 2015. They play in Finley Stadium, which hosted the NCAA Division I Football Championship from 1997 to 2009.

In 2021, the team fired its offensive line coach, Chris Malone, for making a derogatory social media post about Georgia and civil rights leader Stacey Abrams.

=== Athletic venues ===
- Chamberlain Field (1908–1997)
- Finley Stadium (1997–present)
- Maclellan Gymnasium and natatorium (gym opened 1961; natatorium opened 1968)
- McKenzie Arena (1982–present), aka the Roundhouse, due to its circular shape and the city's association with the railroad industry

== National championships ==
=== Team (4) ===
SoCon's logo in Chattanooga's colors

Association	Division	Sport	Year	Opponent/Runner-Up	Score
NCAA	Division II	Men's Basketball	1977	Randolph–Macon	71–62
NCAA	Division II	Women's Tennis	1983	UC Davis	5–4
NCAA	Division II	Women's Tennis	1984	SIU Edwardsville	8–1
NCAA	Division II	Women's Tennis	1985	Notre Dame	8–1

=== Individual (8) ===
Chattanooga has won 8 individual NCAA Championships. All 8 occurred while in the NCAA Division II.
