= VMI Keydets =

Intercollegiate sports teams of Virginia Military Institute

- University: Virginia Military Institute
- Conference: SoCon (primary); MAAC (women's water polo); America East (swimming & diving); NEC (men's lacrosse)
- NCAA: Division I (FCS)
- Athletic director: Jamaal Walton
- Location: Lexington, Virginia
- Varsity teams: 16
- Football stadium: Alumni Memorial Field
- Basketball arena: Cameron Hall
- Baseball stadium: Gray–Minor Stadium
- Soccer stadium: Patchin Field
- Lacrosse stadium: Alumni Memorial Field
- Mascot: Kangaroo (Moe)
- Nickname: Keydets
- Fight song: "The Spirit"
- Colors: Red, white, and yellow
- Website: vmikeydets.com
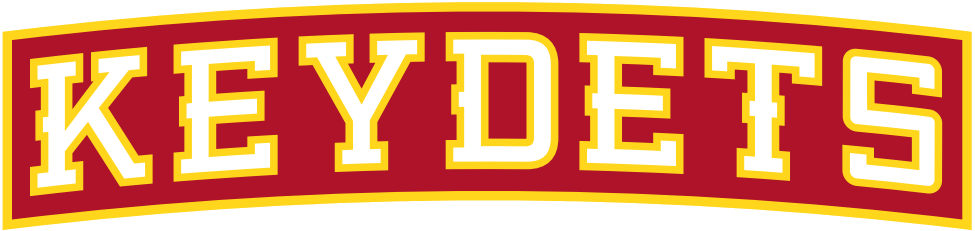

The VMI Keydets are the athletic teams that represent the Virginia Military Institute. All sports participate in the NCAA Division I, and all but three compete in the Southern Conference (the exceptions being men's and women's swimming and diving in the America East Conference, and women's water polo in the Metro Atlantic Athletic Conference. VMI fields teams in sixteen different sports, ten for men and six for women.

Notably, VMI is one of only two Division I schools that do not sponsor women's basketball. The other is fellow Southern Conference member and senior military college: The Citadel.

== Conference affiliations ==
The Keydets played every sport independently until 1900, when they helped found the Virginia Intercollegiate Athletic Association. They remained members of the Association until 1906, when they, along with Washington and Lee University, left the organization, citing internal discord. The Keydets remained independent until 1918, when they joined the short-lived South Atlantic Intercollegiate Athletic Association in 1918 for all sports. With the demise of the conference in 1921, VMI stayed an independent until joining the Southern Conference (SoCon) in 1924, and a massive one at the time.

The next change to be made would not come until 1982, when VMI dropped swimming and diving. The following year, VMI formed a lacrosse program that would play in the United States Intercollegiate Lacrosse Association.

SoCon's logo in VMI's colors

VMI's next changes came in the 1990s, reinstating men's swimming and diving in the Southern States Conference in 1990 and also joining the Mid-Atlantic Rifle Conference (MAC). MAC records are incomplete; the earliest record of VMI participation in that conference is in the 1991 championships (during the 1990–91 school year), when the Keydets only competed in air rifle. The first records of VMI participation in MAC smallbore competition date to 1995 (1994–95 school year). While VMI would later move its swimming and diving program to two other leagues, it has yet to move its rifle program.

In 2003, after 79 years in the SoCon, VMI departed for a then fledgling Big South Conference in all sports but lacrosse, rifle, swimming and diving, and wrestling. Wrestling stayed in the SoCon and rifle in the MAC, while the lacrosse program moved to the Metro Atlantic Athletic Conference (MAAC). Men's swimming and diving moved to the Northeast Conference (NEC); when women's swimming and diving was added in 2005, that program also joined the NEC. Both swimming and diving teams left the NEC in 2007 to become charter members of the Coastal Collegiate Swimming Association (CCSA; now known as the Coastal Collegiate Sports Association). Before the 2017–2018 season, the men's and women's swimming and diving program changed conferences to the America East Conference. When water polo became the newest sport at the Institute in 2009, they accepted their invitation also to the MAAC in 2011.

VMI announced two changes in conference affiliation in 2013. On February 11, the Atlantic Sun Conference (A-Sun) announced that VMI would move its men's lacrosse program to that league effective with the 2014 season (2013–14 school year). On May 30 of that year, the SoCon extended an invitation to the Keydets to rejoin the conference. VMI accepted, along with East Tennessee State and Mercer, and became a member on July 1, 2014, replacing Davidson, Appalachian State, Elon, and Georgia Southern.

When first announced, the return to the SoCon did not include the lacrosse team. However, on January 9, 2014, the A-Sun and SoCon announced a lacrosse partnership which divided sponsorship of the sport between the two leagues effective in 2014–15. Men's lacrosse sponsorship switched to the SoCon, while women's lacrosse sponsorship remained with the A-Sun. Accordingly, the men's lacrosse team also joined the SoCon on July 1, 2014. The rifle teams will join the SoCon when it adds the sport in the 2016–17 school year.

== Sports sponsored ==
A member of the Southern Conference, VMI sponsors teams in eleven men's and seven women's NCAA sanctioned sports with the swimming and diving programs competing in the America East Conference and water polo in the Metro Atlantic Athletic Conference.

Men's sports	Women's sports
Baseball	Cross country
Basketball	Soccer
Cross country	Swimming & diving
Football	Track & field^{†}
Lacrosse	Water polo
Soccer	
Swimming & diving	
Track & field^{†}	
Wrestling	
Co-ed sports
Rifle
† – Track and field includes both indoor and outdoor.

=== Baseball ===
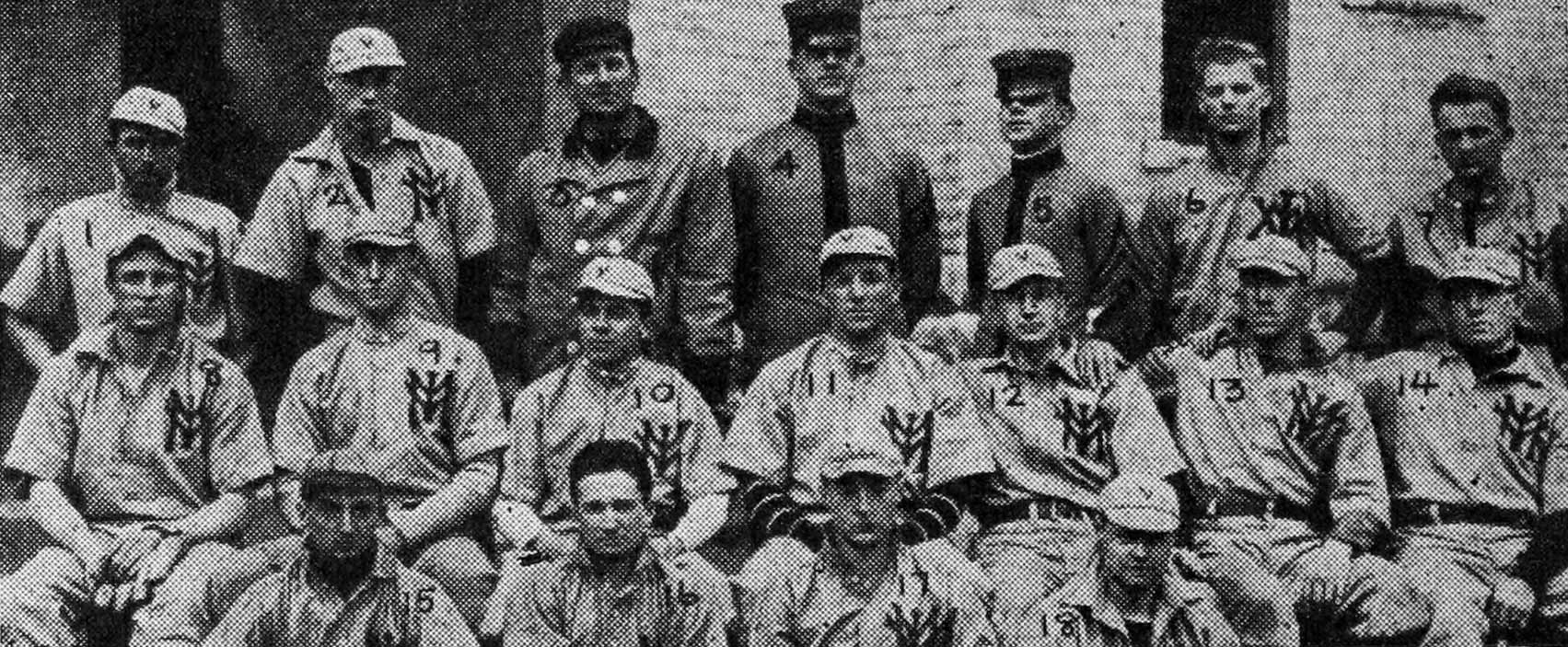
VMI's early baseball team

Baseball is in fact the oldest sport at VMI, when the team was formed in 1866. Recorded schedules only go back as far as 1951, when the team was under the command of Frank Summers. Since 2004, the Keydets have been coached by Marlin Ikenberry. VMI has been SoCon finalists on numerous occasions, but have never won a SoCon championship and did not win a Big South championship while in that conference.

=== Basketball ===
Arguably the most famous years for the Keydets were in 1976 and 77. The first year, VMI made their way to the Elite 8 led by future Laker Ron Carter. The Keydets prevailed over Tennessee and DePaul, before bowing to Rutgers 91–75. However, they wouldn't have to wait long for another chance. The next season, VMI edged Duquesne by 7 to get to the Sweet Sixteen. The Keydets second tournament run came to a halt with a 93–78 loss to Kentucky. Since then, VMI has not won a conference championship or made an NCAA tournament appearance. VMI is coached by Duggar Baucom, who will be entering his 9th year in 2013–14. Cameron Hall has been the home of VMI basketball since 1981.

=== Football ===
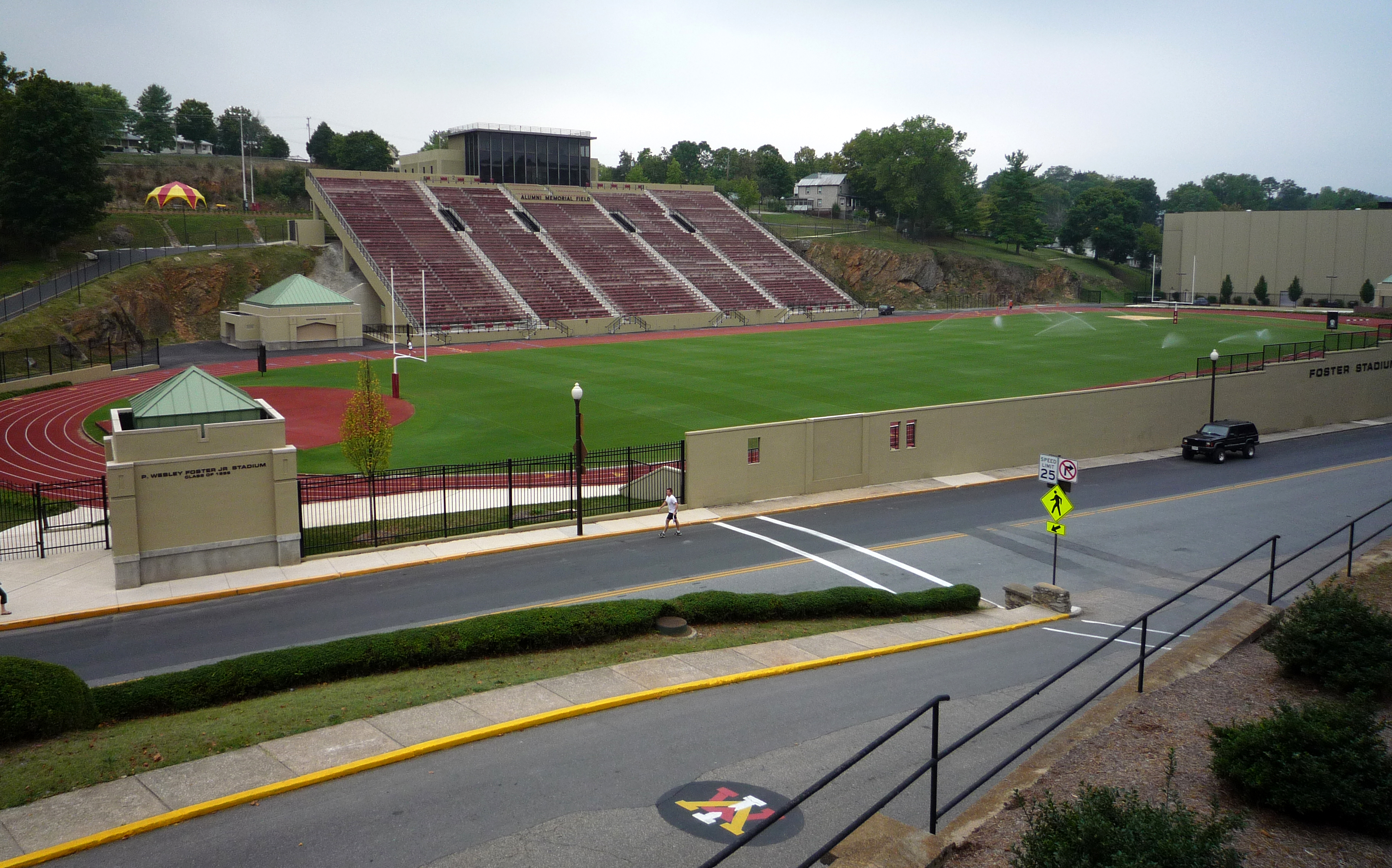
Alumni Memorial Field

VMI football history dates back to 1891 with the formation of a team under Walter Taylor. It actually dates back farther, with a one-game season in 1873, though is not really considered an official season (there were also no player or coaching records). Today, the Keydets play at 10,000-seat Alumni Memorial Field, as they have since 1962. Sparky Woods is the current head coach. He was named VMI's 30th all-time coach on February 13, 2008. Woods replaced Jim Reid who left to coach outside linebackers for the Miami Dolphins. The Keydets achieved their first non-losing seasons since 1981 in 2002 and 2003 and their first winning season since 1981 (and a Southern Conference championship) in 2020.

=== Wrestling ===
For 25 years, VMI has been coached by John Trudgeon, a William and Mary graduate, and is assisted by Chris Skrtetkowicz and Jon Kemmerer. Two All-Americans have wrestled for the institute. In the 1994 NCAA Division I Wrestling Championships, Charlie Branch finished 4th at 142 lbs. Ghanaian wrestler Leslie Apedoe placed sixth in the heavyweight in the 1999 tournament. VMI has played in 1,200-seat Cocke Hall since 1926.

== Club sports ==
- Basketball, which plays their games at Cameron Hall along with the varsity team, and competes in the ECBL
- Men's and women's boxing, which compete in the United States Intercollegiate Boxing Association. The men's team won the 2015 and 2022 USIBA national championships, and VMI hosted the 2017 USIBA nationals.
- Golf, playing in the National Collegiate Club Golf Association
- Grappling
- Ice hockey, which competes in the Blue Ridge Hockey Conference at the LaHaye Ice Center
- Marathon
- Soccer, sometimes referred to as the Virginia Military Institute Football Club (VMIFC)
- Strength Club, which competes in the United States Power-lifting Association
- Triathlon
- Ultimate, which competes in the Ultimate Players Association
- Wrestling, which competes in the National Collegiate Wrestling Association
- Lacrosse, which competes in multiple exhibition games a year across the eastern seaboard

== Radio networks ==
=== Football ===
City	Call sign	Frequency
Lexington	WWZW	96.7 FM
Portsmouth	WJFV	1650 AM
Richmond	WLES / W300DK	590 AM / 107.9 FM
Roanoke	WRTZ	1410 AM

=== Basketball ===
City	Call sign	Frequency
Lexington, VA	WWZW	96.7 FM

=== Baseball ===
City	Call sign	Frequency
Lexington, VA	WREL	1450 AM
