= Western Carolina Catamounts =

Athletic teams of Western Carolina University

- University: Western Carolina University
- Nickname: Catamounts
- NCAA: Division I (FCS)
- Conference: Southern Conference
- Athletic director: Kyle Pifer
- Location: Cullowhee, North Carolina
- Varsity teams: 16
- Football stadium: E. J. Whitmire Stadium
- Basketball arena: Ramsey Center
- Baseball stadium: Hennon Stadium
- Colors: Purple and gold
- Mascot: Paws
- Fight song: Fight on! You Catamounts
- Website: catamountsports.com
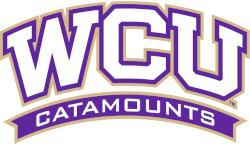

SoCon's logo in Western Carolina's colors

The Western Carolina Catamounts are the intercollegiate athletics teams that represent Western Carolina University. The Catamounts compete in the NCAA Division I as members of the Southern Conference. Western Carolina fields 16 varsity sports teams.

== Nickname ==
The nickname Catamount derives from cats of the catamount variety, including the bobcat, that roams the southern Appalachian Mountains where the school is located. The nickname evolved from a contest that was held on campus in 1933. The school was called Western Carolina Teachers College at that time and its teams were known as "the Teachers". Everyone on campus was invited to participate, and the usual names were suggested: Bears, Indians, Panthers. However, the college wanted an unusual name; a name that few others had and that everyone would not copy. The contest came down to Mountain Boomers, a small ground squirrel that scampers about the woods and is extremely difficult to catch, and Catamounts. Catamounts was the favorite of head football coach C.C. Poindexter and was the nickname chosen. Poindexter wanted his players to be Catamounts with "fierce spirit, savage attacks, and lightning quick moves." Paws the Catamount is the official mascot of Western Carolina University. He appears at numerous events and functions across western North Carolina.

Western Carolina is the only football-playing school in the United States that uses the nickname Catamounts. The University of Vermont is the only other school with the Catamounts moniker.

== Sports sponsored ==
A member of the Southern Conference, Western Carolina sponsors teams in 6 men's and 8 women's NCAA sanctioned sports:

Men's sports	Women's sports
Baseball	Basketball
Basketball	Cross country
Cross country	Golf
Football	Soccer
Golf	Softball
Track and field	Tennis
	Track and field
	Volleyball

=== Baseball ===
- Head Coach: Alan Beck
- Stadium: Ronnie G. Childress Field at Hennon Stadium
- Southern Conference Championships: 23 (13 regular season; 10 tournament)
- NCAA Tournament Appearances: 12 (14–24 overall record)
- MLB Alumni: 10

The Catamounts baseball team has reached the NCAA tournament 12 times, including five straight years from 1985 to 1989, three straight years from 1992 to 1994, and four other times in 1997, 2003, 2007, and 2016. They have made it to the Regional Finals three times in 1992, 2003, and 2007.

=== Men's basketball ===
- Head Coach: Tim Craft
- Arena: Liston B. Ramsey Regional Activity Center
- Southern Conference Championships: 1 (1996)
- Southern Conference Division Titles: 3 (South, 1996; co-North, 2009 & 2011)
- NCAA Tournament Appearances: 1 (1996)
- NBA Alumni: 5

The Catamounts men's basketball team reached the NCAA tournament in 1996, where they dropped their only game against No.1 seed Purdue, 73–71. Western Carolina nearly became the first No.16 seed to beat a No.1 seed in the NCAA tournament, missing two shots in the final 11 seconds to tie the game.

=== Women's basketball ===
- Head Coach: Kiley Hill
- Arena: Liston B. Ramsey Regional Activity Center
- Southern Conference Championships: 2 (2005, 2009)
- NCAA Tournament Appearances: 2 (2005, 2009)

The Catamounts women's basketball team reached the NCAA tournament in 2005 and again in 2009 under the leadership of Kellie Harper, who went on to be the head coach for N.C. State and Tennessee. Western Carolina played West Chester in the first women's basketball national title game in 1969, dropping the game 65–39 to top seed and host West Chester.

=== Football ===
- Head Coach: Kerwin Bell
- Stadium: Bob Waters Field at E.J. Whitmire Stadium
- FCS Playoff Appearances: 1 (1983)
- Playoff Record: 3–1
- National Championship Appearances: 1 (1983)
- NFL Alumni: 15

The Catamounts football team made it to the Division I-AA championship game in 1983, falling to No. 1 seed Southern Illinois. On their way to the championship, Western Carolina upset No. 2 seed Holy Cross and No. 3 seed Furman.

== Southern Conference championships ==
=== Baseball ===
Regular Season: 13 (1981, 1984, 1986, 1987, 1988, 1989, 1992, 1994, 1997, 2003, 2007, 2013, 2014)

Tournament: 10 (1985, 1986, 1987, 1988, 1989, 1992, 1993, 1997, 2003, 2016)

=== Men's basketball ===
Division: 3 (South, 1996; co-North, 2009 & 2011)

Tournament: 1 (1996)

=== Women's basketball ===
Tournament: 2 (2005, 2009)

=== Softball ===
Regular Season: 1 (2006)

=== Volleyball ===
Regular Season: 4 (1983, 1985, 1986, 1989)

Tournament: 3 (1983, 1985, 1986)

=== Women's soccer ===
Regular Season: 2 (2001, 2023)

Tournament: 3 (2005, 2009, 2023)

=== Men's track and field ===
==== Indoor ====
1999, 2004, 2006, 2008, 2012, 2014, 2015, 2016, 2017, 2018, 2019

==== Outdoor ====
1999, 2006, 2007, 2009, 2013, 2016, 2017, 2018, 2019

=== Women's track and field ===
==== Indoor ====
1996, 1997, 1999, 2000, 2008, 2010, 2013, 2014, 2015

==== Outdoor ====
1997, 1999, 2000, 2001, 2008, 2010, 2013, 2015, 2016, 2018

== Facilities ==
- Bob Waters Field at E. J. Whitmire Stadium: Whitmire Stadium is the 13,742-seat home of the football team.
- Liston B. Ramsey Regional Activity Center: The Ramsey Center (often called "The RAC" or "The RACC") is home to the men's and women's basketball and women's volleyball teams. The building was named for Liston B. Ramsey, former speaker of the North Carolina House of Representatives and longtime representative of the 52nd House District that includes Haywood, Madison, Swain, Graham and Jackson counties. The Ramsey Center was completed in April 1986 and seats 7,826 for basketball and was built at a cost of $16.3 million. In addition to housing the athletic department's administrative offices, coaches’ offices, team locker rooms, and meeting facilities, it also contains an auxiliary gymnasium, handball and racquetball courts, a communications center, a firing range and weight rooms. Designed to accommodate cultural, entertainment, recreational, and athletic events, the Ramsey Center can seat up to 8,556 for major concerts.
- Ronnie G. Childress Field at Hennon Stadium: Hennon Stadium is the 1,500-seat home of the Western Carolina Catamounts baseball team. The baseball field's dimensions are 325 feet down each line, 375 feet to the right and left center power alleys and 390 feet to straight away center field. The "Purple Monster" in left field is 100 feet long and is divided into two 50-foot levels. The first and tallest level is 20 feet high and the second level is 14 feet tall. A new clubhouse on the first-base side and stadium seating design are planned for the upcoming seasons.
- Catamount Athletic Complex: The Catamount Athletic Complex is a 1,000-seat sports complex for the track and field, soccer, and tennis programs.
- Catamount Softball Complex: The Catamount Softball Complex is the 250-seat home of the softball team.

== Hall of Fame ==
The university established an athletic hall of fame in 1990. The hall of fame honors those athletes, coaches, and people whose outstanding contributions have enriched the athletic programs of Western Carolina University.

== Football ==
Western Carolina football was born in 1931, thanks to C.C. Poindexter. Often referred to as the "Father of Western Carolina Athletics" because of his efforts in organizing what was then Western Carolina Teachers College's first athletic program in the early 1930s. He was the first to be hired by the college to work exclusively in athletics and became the first head football coach.

He accepted the dual roles of Athletic Director and football coach in 1931. Then, later he also assumed duties as the first head coach in basketball and baseball. His leadership and vision resulted in the construction of the first college football field on the Western Carolina campus. With the help of assistant coaches, he coached three separate scholarship teams. As athletic director, he developed the college's first schedule of strictly college competition.

=== Postseason appearances ===
- 1949

In 1949, Coach Tom Young completed a four-year, post-World War II building program with an 8–2 regular season and the school's first North State Conference championship and first postseason appearance. The team was rewarded by a bid to play in the Smoky Mountain Bowl in Bristol, Virginia, where the Cats lost to West Liberty State. Art Byrd, a 165-pound guard, was named to the Associated Press Little All-America Team, Western's first All-America selection.

- 1974

The 1974 Catamounts, playing in a sparkling new stadium, lost their season and stadium opener to visiting Murray State and struggled the next two weeks before establishing themselves as one of the nation's top NCAA Division II teams. The Catamounts won nine in a row—including victories over top 10 teams Indiana State and Western Kentucky—and won a bid to the NCAA Division II playoffs where they lost to No. 1 ranked Louisiana Tech, 10–7. The 1974 Cats finished the season ranked No. 8 in the Associated Press College Division poll.

- 1983

The 1983 Catamounts got off to a slow start by losing its first two games to Clemson and Wake Forest. After these two setbacks, the Catamounts would go through the next 12 Saturdays unbeaten en route to the NCAA Division I-AA National Championship Game. Despite the strong comeback in regular season play that produced an 8–2–1 regular season record and a No. 9 national ranking, Coach Waters’ Cats barely made it into the I-AA Championship game needing come-from-behind wins the next three weeks. The Cats' wins over Colgate (24–23), Holy Cross (28–21) and Furman (14–7) carried the team to the National Championship Game. The playoff win over Furman was particularly pleasing as the teams had tied, 17–17, in the regular season, which allowed the Paladins to win the Southern Conference Football Title that year (Furman had played and won one more league game due to a scheduling quirk). Over 5,000 WCU fans traveled to Greenville, South Carolina, for the rematch which was aired by CBS-TV. The winning streak ended with a loss to Southern Illinois in the National Championship Game in Charleston, South Carolina. Seven members of the ‘83 squad went on to play in the NFL and the team set an NCAA record for the most games played (15) in a season.

=== Battle for the Old Mountain Jug ===
Western played Appalachian State annually in the Battle for the Old Mountain Jug The first game between Western and Appalachian was held in 1932, but the "Old Mountain Jug" was introduced in 1976. The rivalry ceased after the 2014 meeting due to Appalachian State moving to NCAA FBS. The rivalry between the two mountain schools was a natural, Appalachian and Western were the only public colleges in the western half of North Carolina for decades. Both schools made similar steps to their present status as comprehensive regional universities and both basically recruited athletes from the same high schools in the early years. Their graduates were, for the most part, school teachers – and alumni of both schools often found themselves working together, which helped foster the rivalry.

In 1974, while Western was seeking membership to the Southern Conference, an incident happened that heated up the rivalry. Prior to the WCU-ASU game that year, ASU's athletic director informed Western's President that if Jerry Gaines, Western's all-star wide receiver/kick returner – and arguably the school's best athlete ever – were allowed to play in the WCU-ASU football game in Boone, ASU would withdraw their support of Western's membership for the Southern Conference (ASU was Western's sponsor). Their rationale was that Gaines was playing the 1974 season as a fifth-year [medical red-shirt] and red-shirting was not permitted in the Southern Conference at that time. Gaines had been injured in the first half of the second game of the 1971 season against Appalachian State. Catamount fans believed Appalachian State's motive was based upon Gaines' performance in the previous two meetings in the series, both won handily by the Catamounts.

Gaines did not play in 1974, but his replacement, true-freshman Wayne Tolleson, caught the winning touchdown pass in a 21–17 Catamount victory.

== Baseball ==
Western Carolina University began baseball in 1928, however, records prior to 1951 are incomplete. The first head coach was C.C. Poindexter.

On July 19, 2007, Bobby Moranda was introduced as the 10th head coach for Western Carolina. He retired after the 2022 season.

The baseball program has called Ronnie G. Childress Field/Hennon Stadium its home since 1978. Childress Field, built at an initial cost of $125,000, was dedicated April 26, 1978, and named in honor of the late Ronnie G. Childress, an avid supporter of WCU athletics and a special friend of the baseball program. In 1978, the baseball stadium was moved approximately 200 yards to the east from the former "Haywood Field". The Cats have won over 72 percent of their home games since then, with a 526–201 record in 30 seasons. Bill Haywood, head baseball coach from 1969 through 1981, and Mr. E.J. Whitmire, longtime supporter and benefactor from Franklin, were the driving forces behind the building of the facility. The baseball facility was officially renamed Ronnie G. Childress Field at Hennon Stadium in a dedication program on April 23, 1994.

All-time coaching history

Coach	Years	Record
Jim Gudger	1951–60, '63	140–83
Charles Seeger	1961–62	20–21
Ron Blackburn	1964–68	78–65
Bill Haywood	1969–81	215–161–2
David Wright	1982	28–12
Jack Leggett	1983–91	302–226
Keith LeClair	1992–97	229–135–2
Rodney Hennon	1998–99	81–38
Todd Raleigh	2000–07	257–209
Bobby Moranda	2008–2022	401–386–1
Alan Beck	2023–Present	

== Men's basketball ==
Western Carolina began playing basketball in 1928, under head coach Pete Plemmons.

Kevin Martin of Minnesota Timberwolves played for the Western Carolina Catamounts (2001–2004), and was a first-round draft choice, selected by the Sacramento Kings.

Dikembe Mutombo's nephew Harouna Mutombo played college basketball for the Western Carolina Catamounts from 2007 to 2012. Harouna was the team's leading scorer for the 2009 season and was named Southern Conference Freshman of the Year.

Mark Prosser was hired as the 18th head coach on March 27, 2018.

All-time coaching history

Coach	Years	Record
Pete Plemmons	1928–31	35–22
C.C. Poindexter	1931–35	50–30
Ralph James	1935–39	47–39
James Whatley	1939–42	33–18
Marion McDonald	1945–47	28–22
Tuck McConnell	1947–50	37–43
Jim Gudger	1951–69	311–222
Jim Hartbarger	1969–75	86–73
Fred Conley	1974–77	31–32
Steve Cottrell	1977–87	145–133
Herb Krusen	1987–88	8–19
Dave Possinger	1988–90	12–16
Greg Blatt	1989–93	38–73
Benny Dees	1993–95	26–30
Phil Hopkins	1995–2000	65–76
Steve Shurina	2001–05	48–97
Larry Hunter	2005–18	193–229
Mark Prosser	2018–2021	37–53
Justin Gray	2021–2024	51–47
Tim Craft	2024–	0–0

== Women's basketball ==
Lady Catamount basketball was added as a varsity sport at Western Carolina University in 1965. Betty Westmoreland started Western Carolina's intercollegiate basketball program and coached the Lady Catamounts for 14 years. The program grew from independent status to NAIAW, NCAA Division II, then NCAA Division I. Her team compiled a 190–89 record, never suffering a losing season in 14 years. The team was the national CIAW runner-up in the 1968–69 season and finished fourth the following year in the tournament. The current head coach is Kiley Hill.

All-time coaching history

Coach	Years	Record
Betty Westmoreland	1965–79	189–89
Judy Murray	1979–81	28–22
Judy Stroud	1981–85	46–58
Tony Baldwin	1985–90	51–83
Janet Cone	1990–93	17–65
Gary Peters	1993–97	34–74
Maria Fantanarosa	1997–98	7–20
Jill Dunn	1998–2000	23–33
Beth Dunkenberger	2000–04	65–50
Kelli Harper	2004–09	97–65
Karen Middleton	2009–15	63–121
Stephanie McCormick	2015–19	23–94
Kiley Hill	2019–23	27–87

== Softball ==
The Western Carolina women's fastpitch softball team completed its inaugural season in 2006. With a 41–20 record, it won the Southern Conference regular season championship. The Lady Catamounts' home field is the Catamount Softball Complex.

All-time coaching history

Coach	Years	Record
Megan Smith	2006–07	41–29
Christine Hornak	2007–2011	111–216
JIm Clift	2011–Present	136–189

== Soccer ==
Program history:

- Most consecutive wins: 5 (September 30, 2001 – October 14, 2001)
- Most consecutive wins at home: 14 (October 3, 2000 – September 6, 2002)
- Most consecutive losses at home: 2 (August 27, 1999 – October 19, 2003)
- Longest unbeaten streak: 8 (September 16, 1999 – October 13, 1999)
- Longest unbeaten streak at home: 17 (October 3, 2000 – October 11, 2002)
- Longest unbeaten streak on road: 5 (September 4, 1999 – October 13, 1999)

All-time coaching history

Coach	Year	Record
Debbie Hensley	1999–04	55–52–11
Tammy Decesare	2005–09	58–36–13
Chad Miller	2010–Pres.	72–83–19

== Track and field ==
- Head Coach Jesse Norman

In 2012, Danny Williamson began his 25th year as men's head coach and his 26th year as head of the women's program. During his tenure, Western's Track and Field Program the Catamounts moved from the lower levels of the Southern Conference to a prominent place in the top tier of the conference standings year in and year out.

Under Williamson, the Catamounts (men and women) have claimed 17 Southern Conference Team Championships between indoor and outdoor seasons. Williamson has witnessed over 700 of his athletes receive All-Southern Conference Awards and over 225 Western Carolina Track and Field/Cross Country Athletes be named an Individual Conference Event Champion.

Selected as Southern Conference Coach of the Year on 25 occasions and in 1999, 2004 and 2006 he was selected the NCAA Regional Track and Field Coach of the Year. A 1985 graduate of Western Carolina University with a bachelor's degree in Physical Education, Williamson returned to Western and completed his Master's in Education in 1986.

Danny Williamson retired in 2016 and Cale McDaniel was named the next head men's and women's cross country/track & field coach at Western Carolina as announced by director of athletics Randy Eaton.

After a successful 2016, 2017, and 2018 McDaniel left to Kennesaw State University as director of track and field.

Jesse Norman was then announced in 2019 to be named the next head men's and women's cross country/track & field coach at Western Carolina as announced by director of athletics Randy Eaton.

Norman returns to Cullowhee after spending the previous 12 seasons as head coach of the UNC Asheville cross country and track and field programs. Under Norman's guidance, the Bulldogs had four student-athletes earn All-American honors along with eight NCAA East Preliminary qualifiers, 18 Big South Conference champions and 57 Big South All-Conference honorees. Norman is a two-time Big South Coach of the Year, most recently claiming the 2018 Big South Women's Track Coach of the Year.

Southern Conference championships:

- Men's indoor: 1999, 2004, 2006, 2008, 2012, 2014, 2015, 2016, 2017, 2018, 2019
- Men's outdoor: 1999, 2006, 2007, 2009, 2013, 2016, 2017, 2018, 2019
- Women's indoor: 1996, 1997, 1999, 2000, 2008, 2010, 2013, 2014, 2015
- Women's outdoor: 2008, 2010, 2013, 2015, 2016, 2018

== Club sports ==
- Ballroom dance
- Bass fishing
- Cheer
- Climbing
- Cycling
- Equestrian
- Men's baseball
- Men's lacrosse
- Men's rugby
- Men's soccer
- Men's volleyball
- Tennis
- Ultimate frisbee
- Women's basketball
- Women's lacrosse
- Women's rugby
- Women's soccer
- Women's volleyball
- Women's softball
