= Wofford Terriers =

Intercollegiate sports teams of Wofford College

- University: Wofford College
- Nickname: Terriers
- NCAA: Division I (FCS)
- Conference: SoCon (primary)
- Athletic director: Scott Kull
- Location: Spartanburg, South Carolina
- Varsity teams: 20 (9 men's, 10 women's, 1 co-ed)
- Football stadium: Gibbs Stadium
- Basketball arena: Jerry Richardson Indoor Stadium
- Baseball stadium: Russell C. King Field
- Soccer stadium: Snyder Field
- Tennis venue: Reeves Tennis Center
- Colors: Old gold and black
- Mascot: Boss, Lil' Ruff
- Website: woffordterriers.com
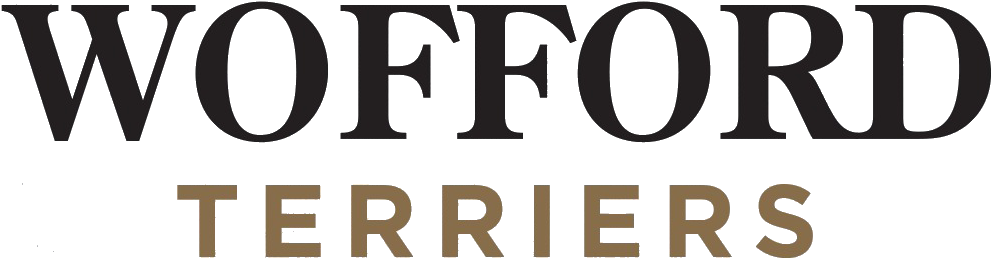

SoCon logo in Wofford colors

The Wofford Terriers are the athletic teams that represent the Wofford College, located in Spartanburg, South Carolina, in intercollegiate sports at the Division I level of the National Collegiate Athletic Association (NCAA), primarily competing in the Southern Conference since the 1997–98 academic year. Wofford and the other SoCon members play football in the Football Championship Subdivision. Prior to the 1995–96 year, the Terriers played in Division II in all sports, and until the 1988–89 period, Wofford's athletic teams were members of the NAIA. The football team plays in Gibbs Stadium. The basketball teams moved to the new Jerry Richardson Indoor Stadium for the 2017–18 season.

The Wofford campus is also the former site of the training camp of the NFL's Carolina Panthers, whose former owner, Jerry Richardson, was a Wofford alumnus. Richardson’s net worth, 2.2 billion dollars, was the highest by any NFL former player ever.

== Teams ==
A member of the Southern Conference, Wofford College sponsors teams in nine men's, eight women's, and one coed NCAA sanctioned sports:

Men's sports	Women's sports
Baseball	Basketball
Basketball	Cross country
Cross country	Golf
Football	Lacrosse
Golf	Soccer
Soccer	Softball
Tennis	Tennis
Track and field^{†}	Track and field^{†}
	Volleyball
Co-ed sports
Rifle
† – Track and field includes both indoor and outdoor

=== Baseball ===
Although the sport has a story with the college that traces to the 1860s, the first Wofford team was formed in 1889, though records of that era are thin. Between 1898 and 1903, a well-balanced Wofford baseball team won about 33 games with 13 losses. Early Wofford teams played at textile parks until the field was leveled and expanded to add a baseball diamond.

Home games are played at Russell C. King Field, with a capacity of 2,500.

=== Men's basketball ===
The first basketball teams started in early 1900s, with class teams and a varsity team. The first Wofford game recorded was a 1906 win over Wake Forest. Due to the lack of records about those years, the court where Wofford played their games until the Andrews Fieldhouse opened in 1929 is still unknown.

The Terriers' men's basketball team competes in the Southern Conference. They have won 4 regular season SoCon Titles and 5 SoCon Tournament Championships and 1 SoCon Tournament Runner-Up. The Terriers currently hold a 1–5 record in the NCAA Tournament. Wofford has defeated various high major opponents during their 27 years in D1. They have beaten North Carolina twice, South Carolina twice, Georgia twice, Clemson, Georgia Tech, NC State, Seton Hall, Purdue, Tulane, Wake Forest, Cincinnati, Auburn, Virginia Tech, Air Force, George Mason, Xavier and Texas A&M since joining D1 for the 1995–96 season.

=== Women's basketball ===
The women's basketball team played its first tournament in 1980–81. Wofford has defeated Alabama and Virginia, among others

=== Football ===
Wofford fielded its first football team in 1889. That season, Wofford and Furman played the first intercollegiate football game in South Carolina. There is no record of more than four games in a season before 1900. Wofford has made the Division 1AA playoffs on several occasions, including advancing to the semifinals.

=== Soccer ===
The Terriers fielded their first team in 1975, currently competing in the SoCon. Wofford's records include most victories (14) in 1994, fewest losses (3) in 1994 and 2009, 11 consecutive wins in 1994, most goals scored (53) in 1994, fewest goals allowed (14) in 1991. Since its inception, the team has been under the guidance of six coaches.

Wofford has also competed in the NCAA Division I tournmanet, making one appearance in the 2009 edition, when the team lost to Santa Barbara 1–0 in first round.
