= The Citadel Bulldogs women's soccer =

American college soccer team

- Founded: 2001
- University: The Citadel
- Athletic director: Art Chase
- Head coach: Ciaran Traquair (11th season)
- Conference: SoCon
- Location: Charleston, South Carolina, US
- Stadium: WLI Field
- Nickname: Bulldogs
- Colors: Infantry blue and white

The Citadel Bulldogs women's soccer is an intercollegiate varsity sports team of The Citadel. The team is a member of the Southern Conference of the National Collegiate Athletic Association, and was established in 2001 shortly after the integration of women into the South Carolina Corps of Cadets. The men's soccer program was discontinued in 2004.

== Head coaches ==
The table below shows the Bulldogs head coaches and their records through the 2021 season.

Name	Seasons	W	L	T	PCT
Megan Hjerling	4	12	57	4	.192
Chris Lenzo	1	2	17	0	.105
Bob Winch	10	47	134	12	.275
Ciaran Traquair	11	72	108	20	.410
Total	23	133	316	39	.313

== All-time results ==
The table below shows the Bulldogs record for all seasons through 2021.

		Overall			SoCon
Year	Head coach	W	L	T	W	L	T
2001	Megan Hjerling	3	17	0	0	10	0
2002	Megan Hjerling	5	11	2	0	10	0
2003	Megan Hjerling	2	14	1	0	11	0
2004	Megan Hjerling	2	15	1	0	10	1
2005	Chris Lenzo	2	17	1	0	10	0
2006	Bob Winch	1	17	1	0	9	1
2007	Bob Winch	3	16	0	0	10	0
2008	Bob Winch	3	14	1	1	10	0
2009	Bob Winch	5	12	2	2	7	2
2010	Bob Winch	12	8	1	7	4	0
2011	Bob Winch	5	11	3	3	6	2
2012	Bob Winch	5	12	1	3	7	1
2013	Bob Winch	5	11	2	3	7	0
2014	Bob Winch	7	14	0	2	7	0
2015	Bob Winch	1	19	0	0	9	0
2016	Ciaran Traquair	5	13	0	1	8	0
2017	Ciaran Traquair	5	13	0	0	9	0
2018	Ciaran Traquair	9	10	0	2	7	0
2019	Ciaran Traquair	6	11	2	1	8	0
2020–21	Ciaran Traquair	7	9	3	1	6	1
2021	Ciaran Traquair	10	7	2	3	4	2
2022	Ciaran Traquair	10	9	0	4	5	0
2023	Ciaran Traquair	3	9	6	0	7	2
2024	Ciaran Traquair	4	11	2	0	8	1
2025	Ciaran Traquair	5	9	3	2	5	2
2026	Ciaran Traquair	8	7	4	3	5	2
Total		133	316	39	38	199	17
