= Samford Bulldogs =

Collegiate sports club in the United States

- University: Samford University
- NCAA: Division I (FCS)
- Conference: Southern Conference
- Athletic director: Martin Newton
- Location: Homewood, Alabama
- Varsity teams: 17
- Football stadium: Pete Hanna Stadium
- Basketball arena: Pete Hanna Center
- Baseball stadium: Joe Lee Griffin Stadium
- Nickname: Bulldogs
- Colors: Blue and red
- Website: samfordsports.com

SoCon's logo in Samford's colors

The Samford Bulldogs are the 17 varsity teams (8 men's and 9 women's) that represent Samford University in NCAA Division I athletics. The men's basketball team made its first NCAA Tournament appearances in 1999 and 2000. They were led by Reed Rawlings, Marc Salyers, and Chris Weaver. The women's basketball team made its initial NCAA tournament appearance in the 2011 NCAA Women's Division I Basketball Tournament and made its second consecutive appearance in the tournament in 2012. The baseball team made its first NCAA tournament appearance in the 2012 NCAA Division I baseball tournament, reaching the finals of the Tallahassee Regional.

Additionally, the softball team made its first NCAA Tournament Appearance in 2016. For the first time in history, the Lady Bulldogs won the regular-season championship as well as the Tournament Championship to cap off a record high of 40 wins on the season. The school is a member of the Southern Conference in Division I of the NCAA (FCS in football), after moving from the Ohio Valley Conference in 2008. The Samford Athletics staff is headed by athletic director Martin Newton, whose appointment was announced on March 9, 2011.

== Teams ==
A member of the Southern Conference, Samford sponsors teams in eight men's and nine women's NCAA sanctioned sports:

Men's sports	Women's sports
Baseball	Basketball
Basketball	Cross country
Cross Country	Golf
Football	Soccer
Golf	Softball
Tennis	Tennis
Track and field^{1}	Track and field^{1}
	Volleyball
^{1}indoor and outdoor

== Facilities ==
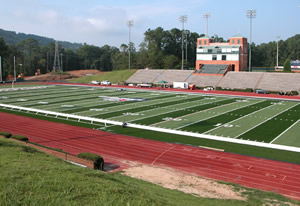
Bobby Bowden Field at Pete Hanna Stadium, home of Bulldogs football team

- Pete Hanna Stadium - Pete Hanna Stadium is a 6,700-seat stadium and has been home to Samford's football team since 1958. The facility opened in 1958 and was named for F. Page Seibert, a Daytona Beach, Florida businessman, who in 1961, donated money for the completion of the west side of the stadium. In 2021, the field was named “Bobby Bowden Field” in honor of football coach Bobby Bowden. On October 14, 2023, the university announced the stadium structure was to be renamed Pete Hanna Stadium.

Over the years, Seibert has seen some memorable football, including the Bobby Bowden era (1959–62), a one-loss season in 1971 and the Terry Bowden era, which ended with a 14-game Bulldog winning streak in the stadium. In Fall 2005, the playing surface, which had always been natural grass, was replaced by a new LSR Blade Synthetic Surface. The artificial turf also includes an extensive drainage system. The largest crowd in stadium history was in 1994 against Steve McNair and Alcorn State when 11,189 fans showed up.

- Sullivan-Cooney Family Field House - The new 39,000-square-foot (3,600 m^{2}) Cooney Family Field House is located in the south end of F. Page Seibert Stadium on the Samford campus. The $7.5 million building was completely funded with private financial support, according to W. Randall Pittman, Samford's vice president for university relations. The new field house includes locker rooms, training rooms, weight rooms, equipment storage, offices and meeting rooms for Samford's football program. A second-level terrace will be used to host special events, especially on football game days. The building replaces facilities in Seibert Gym that date to that building's construction in the late 1950s. A third level on the building will be finished at a later date. That level will be used to house academic and administrative offices during transition periods of other new construction or building renovations on campus. "This new building provides our football program with state-of-the-art facilities at an important time for Samford athletics," Bob Roller, the athletic director at the time of construction, said. "With the university's move to the Southern Conference, it is critical for us to compete at all levels – on the field, in the classroom and facilities – with our new conference counterparts." Visiting teams will continue to use locker rooms and other facilities in Seibert Hall adjacent to the stadium, Roller said. Gary C. Wyatt General Contractor LLC is the Birmingham-based contractor for the building, which was designed by Davis Architects of Birmingham. During the 2014 season, the facility was renamed in honor of then head coach Pat Sullivan and is now known as the Sullivan-Cooney Family Field House.
- Seibert Hall - Originally opened in 1959, the lower floor played host to Samford basketball until the main gym was added in 1961. At that time, the basketball teams moved upstairs and used the facility until the new Corts Arena in the new Hanna Center was completed in Fall 2007. Seibert has been home to Samford volleyball from 1987. Seibert Hall is also named for F. Page Seibert, a Dayton Beach, Fla., businessman, who donated the money for the completion of the upper floors. It was the largest donation at the time to then-Howard College. In 2025, Seibert Hall was transformed into a recreation center in 2025.
- Pete Hanna Center - A new, state-of-the-art multi-purpose facility has been completed (with the exception of landscaping, and other minor details), as a part of Samford's improvement campaign, The Promise, next door to Seibert Hall and its Bashinsky Fieldhouse. The new building was christened Pete Hanna Center on Friday, October 19, 2007, while the arena itself was designated the Thomas E. and Marla H. Corts Arena. The facility was scheduled for completion by Homecoming weekend 2007 (October 19–21), but was still being worked on up to the last few hours before the first Homecoming event in the center was to take place on October 18. The new facility, one of the largest buildings ever built to strictly conform to Georgian style architecture, holds 5,000 for basketball and volleyball, 6,000 for concerts and commencements, and cost $32 million. Samford, wanting to show that the Hanna Center will truly be a multi-purpose facility, hosted three back-to-back major events on the Hanna Center's opening weekend. On October 18, Samford chose to make the first event the annual J. Roderick Davis Lecture, featuring author Walter Isaacson. On October 19, the center was officially christened and the 141st Annual Homecoming Alumni Gala Dinner was held on the Corts Arena floor. On October 20, the Homecoming concert, featuring Little Big Town, was held in the Corts Arena. The new fitness facility in the Pete Hanna Center for faculty and students opened on Monday November 26, 2007. The center is named after Birmingham businessman Pete Hanna, who played football for Samford when it was Howard College in the 1950s. The arena is named after Samford's president emeritus and his wife. Dr. Thomas Corts retired as Samford's president in May 2006 and died in 2009.
- Joe Lee Griffin Field - Samford's baseball program plays at Joe Lee Griffin Field, a 1,000-seat facility that was constructed in 2000.
- Samford Track and Soccer Complex - Located across Lakeshore Drive from the main campus, the Samford Track and Soccer Complex was opened in the spring of 2011. The facility hosted the 2011 Southern Conference Outdoor Track and Field Championships just hours after the official ribbon-cutting ceremony. The complex, which includes a nine-lane track with a regulation soccer field inside the track, also hosted the 2012 SoCon Women's Soccer Championship. The soccer field in the complex was Shauna Yelton Field in September 2021.Yelton was the former director of health services at Samford and the wife of soccer coach Todd Yelton. In 2025 Samford announced a plan to redevelop the complex's current site to be part of Creekside West, a "town square" complex that would provide additional housing and other amenities within walking distance of the campus. Initially the university planned to build a new complex on the site of current intramural fields. When the community opposed that plan because the new complex would destroy the breading habitat of local spotted salamanders, the university announced that the new complex would be built on a portion of the Homewood Soccer Park in a partnership with the City of Homewood many community members opposed the development. That plan was also withdrawn due to community opposition. After three months of community discussion, Samford withdrew the entire proposal.
- Other facilities
  - Pat M. Courington Tennis Pavilion
  - Bulldog Softball Field

== Mascot and school colors ==
Samford's intercollegiate athletics teams are nicknamed the Bulldogs, and the team was represented by a costumed bulldog, complete with spiked collar and nasty growl, at football and basketball games. This mascot named “Spike” was retired in 2017 and replaced by a in-collared bulldog named "Sam", who was introduced in 2017. The mascots have been known to appear at other competitions where Samford is competing.

Even when it was Howard College, the school's colors were Red and Blue. Today, the red tends to be a bright color and the blue is usually depicted as a darker, navy blue. Both colors are primary (though, as the name of the student fan club, The Red Sea, and the name of the student newspaper, The Crimson, show that many Samford students lean toward red).

== Rivalries ==
When Samford joined the Southern Conference it made new rivals with its conference foes. Their geographically closest conference opponents are Chattanooga and Mercer.

Samford also contends against SEC powerhouses and fellow Alabama institutions Alabama and Auburn in some sports—and often fares well. For example, in 2021 the Women’s Soccer Team upset the Auburn Tigers 2-0 in the first round of the NCAA Tournament. In 2006 the Samford baseball team defeated Auburn in the annual game at the Hoover Met and in 2010 the Samford basketball team defeated Auburn for the third time. Samford's baseball team also defeated #21 Alabama in 2011.
