= 2025 Big Ten softball tournament =

College softball tournament in Indiana

- Teams: 12
- Format: Single-elimination tournament
- Finals site: Bittinger Stadium; West Lafayette, Indiana
- Champions: Michigan (12th title)
- Runner-up: UCLA (1st title game)
- Winning coach: Bonnie Tholl (2nd title)
- MVP: Lauren Derkowski (Michigan)
- Television: BTN

2025 Big Ten Conference softball standings
	Conf.						Overall
Team	W		L		T	PCT	W		L		T	PCT
No. 6 Oregon ‍†‍‍^{y}	19	–	3	–	0	.864	54	–	10	–	0	.844
No. 19 Nebraska ‍‍‍^{y}	17	–	5	–	0	.773	43	–	15	–	0	.741
No. 9 UCLA ‍‍‍^{y}	17	–	5	–	0	.773	55	–	13	–	0	.809
Northwestern ‍‍‍^{y}	16	–	6	–	0	.727	30	–	20	–	1	.598
No. 22 Ohio State ‍‍‍^{y}	16	–	6	–	0	.727	45	–	14	–	1	.758
Iowa ‍‍‍	15	–	7	–	0	.682	35	–	18	–	0	.660
Washington ‍‍‍^{y}	12	–	9	–	0	.571	35	–	19	–	0	.648
Michigan ‍‍‡‍^{y}	11	–	11	–	0	.500	39	–	21	–	0	.650
Wisconsin ‍‍‍	11	–	11	–	0	.500	33	–	21	–	0	.611
Indiana ‍‍‍^{y}	11	–	12	–	0	.478	34	–	20	–	0	.630
Penn State ‍‍‍	10	–	12	–	0	.455	25	–	27	–	0	.481
Purdue ‍‍‍	9	–	14	–	0	.391	30	–	23	–	0	.566
Illinois ‍‍‍	6	–	15	–	0	.286	22	–	28	–	0	.440
Michigan State ‍‍‍	6	–	16	–	0	.273	16	–	29	–	0	.356
Minnesota ‍‍‍	5	–	17	–	0	.227	20	–	30	–	0	.400
Maryland ‍‍‍	3	–	19	–	0	.136	18	–	31	–	0	.367
Rutgers ‍‍‍	3	–	19	–	0	.136	20	–	36	–	0	.357
† – Conference champion ‡ – Tournament champion y – Invited to the NCAA Tournament; As of June 1, 2025; Rankings from NFCA/USA Today

The 2025 Big Ten softball tournament was held at Bittinger Stadium in West Lafayette, Indiana from May 7 through May 10, 2025. As the tournament winner, Michigan earned the Big Ten Conference's automatic bid to the 2025 NCAA Division I softball tournament. All games of the tournament will be aired on BTN.

== Seeds ==
The top 12 Big Ten schools participate in the tournament. Teams are seeded by conference record, with the top four teams receiving a first-round bye.

Seed	School	W–L	Pct	GB No. 1
1	Oregon	19–3	.864	–
2	UCLA	17–5	.773	2
3	Nebraska	17–5	.773	2
4	Ohio State	16–6	.727	3
5	Northwestern	16–6	.727	3
6	Iowa	15–7	.682	4
7	Washington	12–9	.571	7
8	Michigan	11–11	.500	8
9	Wisconsin	11–11	.500	8
10	Indiana	11–12	.478	9
11	Penn State	10–12	.455	9
12	Purdue	9–13	.409	10
DNQ	Illinois	6–15	.286	13
DNQ	Michigan State	6–16	.273	13
DNQ	Minnesota	5–17	.227	14
DNQ	Maryland	3–19	.136	16
DNQ	Rutgers	3–19	.136	16

== Schedule ==
Game	Time*	Matchup^{#}	Score	Television
First Round – Wednesday, May 7
1	11:00 a.m.	No. 11 Penn State vs. No. 6 Iowa	6–2	BTN
2	1:30 p.m.	No. 10 Indiana vs. No. 7 Washington	2–0	BTN
3	4:30 p.m.	No. 9 Wisconsin vs. No. 8 Michigan	2–3	BTN
4	7:00 p.m.	No. 12 Purdue vs. No. 5 Northwestern	4–2	BTN
Quarterfinals – Thursday, May 8
5	11:00 a.m.	No. 3 Nebraska vs. No. 11 Penn State	9–1^{(5)}	BTN
6	1:30 p.m.	No. 2 UCLA vs. No. 10 Indiana	5–4	BTN
7	4:30 p.m.	No. 1 Oregon vs. No. 8 Michigan	0–5	BTN
8	7:00 p.m.	No. 4 Ohio State vs. No. 12 Purdue	6–14	BTN
Semifinals – Friday, May 9
9	5:00 p.m.	No. 3 Nebraska vs. No. 2 UCLA	2–4	BTN
10	7:30 p.m.	No. 8 Michigan vs. No. 12 Purdue	4–2	BTN
Championship – Saturday, May 10
11	4:00 p.m.	No. 2 UCLA vs. No. 8 Michigan	0–2	BTN
*Game times in EDT. # – Rankings denote tournament seed.

== Tournament ==
1st Round; May 7th BTN
11	Penn State	6
6	Iowa	2
10	Indiana	2
7	Washington	0
9	Wisconsin	2
8	Michigan	3
12	Purdue	4
5	Northwestern	2

Quarterfinals; May 8th BTN
3	Nebraska	9^{(5)}
11	Penn State	1
2	UCLA	5
10	Indiana	4
1	Oregon	0
8	Michigan	5
4	Ohio State	6
12	Purdue	14

Semifinals; May 9th BTN
3	Nebraska	2
2	UCLA	4
8	Michigan	4
12	Purdue	2

Finals; May 10th BTN
2	UCLA	0
8	Michigan	2
