= 2025 Big 12 Conference softball tournament =

- Teams: 11
- Format: Single-elimination tournament
- Finals site: Devon Park; Oklahoma City, Oklahoma
- Champions: Texas Tech (1st title)
- Runner-up: Arizona (1st title game)
- Winning coach: Gerry Glasco (1st title)
- MVP: NiJaree Canady (Texas Tech)

2025 Big 12 Conference softball standings
	Conf.						Overall
Team	W		L		T	PCT	W		L		T	PCT
No. 10 Texas Tech ‍†‍‡‍^{y}	20	–	4	–	0	.833	54	–	14	–	0	.794
No. 12 Arizona ‍‍‍^{y}	17	–	7	–	0	.708	48	–	13	–	0	.787
Iowa State ‍‍‍	15	–	9	–	0	.625	31	–	23	–	0	.574
No. 24 Oklahoma State ‍‍‍^{y}	13	–	9	–	0	.591	35	–	20	–	0	.636
Arizona State ‍‍‍^{y}	14	–	10	–	0	.583	35	–	21	–	0	.625
BYU ‍‍‍	13	–	11	–	0	.542	32	–	17	–	0	.653
UCF ‍‍‍^{y}	12	–	12	–	0	.500	35	–	24	–	1	.592
Baylor ‍‍‍	11	–	13	–	0	.458	27	–	27	–	0	.500
Kansas ‍‍‍	6	–	18	–	0	.250	22	–	28	–	0	.440
Utah ‍‍‍	5	–	19	–	0	.208	13	–	40	–	0	.245
Houston ‍‍‍	4	–	18	–	0	.182	22	–	25	–	0	.468
† – Conference champion ‡ – Tournament champion y – Invited to the NCAA Tournament; As of June 6, 2025; Rankings from NFCA/USA Today

The 2025 Big 12 Conference softball tournament was held at Devon Park in Oklahoma City, Oklahoma from May 7 to May 10, 2025. As the tournament winner, Texas Tech earned the Big 12 Conference's automatic bid to the 2025 NCAA Division I softball tournament.

== Format ==
All eleven teams were seeded based on conference winning percentage. They then played a single-elimination tournament, with the top five seeds receiving a first-round bye.

== Seeds ==
The tournament featured all eleven teams in this conference (Cincinnati, Colorado, Kansas State, TCU & West Virginia do not field teams). Teams played once per day at the 2025 Big 12 Softball Championship. The seedings were determined upon completion of regular season play. The winning percentage of the teams in conference play determined tournament seedings. There were tiebreakers in place to seed teams with identical conference records.

Seed	School	Conf.	Over.	Tiebreaker
#1	Texas Tech#†	20−4	45−12	―
#2	Arizona†	17−7	44−11	―
#3	Iowa State†	15−9	30−23	―
#4	Oklahoma State†	13−9	33−18	―
#5	Arizona State†	14−10	25−19	―
#6	BYU	13−11	32−16	―
#7	UCF	12−12	33−21−1	―
#8	Baylor	11−13	27−27	―
#9	Kansas	6−18	22−28	―
#10	Utah	5−19	13−40	―
#11	Houston	4−18	22−25	―

Notes: # – Big 12 regular season champions, and tournament No. 1 seed
† – Received a single-bye into the conference tournament second round.

== Bracket ==
Play-in Game; May 7
9	Kansas	3
8	Baylor	7
10	Utah	5
7	UCF	7
11	Houston	0
6	BYU	4

Quarterfinals; May 8
1	Texas Tech	4
8	Baylor	0
5	Arizona State	2
4	Oklahoma State	1
2	Arizona	4
7	UCF	3
3	Iowa State	4
6	BYU	2

Semifinals; May 9
1	Texas Tech	18^{(5)}
5	Arizona State	0
2	Arizona	6
3	Iowa State	3

Finals; May 10
1	Texas Tech	4
2	Arizona	0

== Schedule ==
Game	Time*	Matchup^{#}	Score	Television
First Round – Wednesday, May 7
1	2:30 p.m.	No. 8 Baylor vs. No. 9 Kansas	7–3	ESPN+
2	5:00 p.m.	No. 7 UCF vs. No. 10 Utah	7–5	ESPN+
3	7:30 p.m.	No. 6 BYU vs. No. 11 Houston	4–0	ESPN+
Quarterfinals – Thursday, May 8
4	11:00 a.m.	No. 4 Oklahoma State vs. No. 5 Arizona State	1–2	ESPN+
5	1:30 p.m.	No. 1 Texas Tech vs. No. 8 Baylor	4–0	ESPN+
6	5:00 p.m.	No. 2 Arizona vs. No. 7 UCF	4–3	ESPN+
7	7:30 p.m.	No. 3 Iowa State vs. No. 6 BYU	4–2	ESPN+
Semifinals – Friday, May 9
8	3:00 p.m.	No. 1 Texas Tech vs. No. 5 Arizona State	18–0^{(5)}	ESPN+
9	5:30 p.m.	No. 2 Arizona vs No. 3 Iowa State	6–3	ESPN+
Championship – Saturday, May 10
10	11:00 a.m.	No. 1 Texas Tech vs. No. 2 Arizona	4–0	ESPN
*Game times in CST. # – Rankings denote tournament seed.

== All-Tournament Team ==
The following players were named to the all-tournament team:

Player	School
Devyn Netz	Arizona
Regan Shockey	Arizona
Sydney Stewart	Arizona
Kenzie Brown	Arizona State
Aleia Agbayani	BYU
Ashleigh Griffin	UCF
Angelina Allen	Iowa State
Mihyia Davis	Texas Tech
Alana Johnson	Texas Tech
Hailey Toney	Texas Tech
NiJaree Canady (MOP)	Texas Tech
