= 2025 Texas Tech Red Raiders softball team =

College softball season

2025 Texas Tech Red Raiders softball

Big 12 regular-season champion Big 12 tournament champion NCAA Lubbock Regional champion NCAA Tallahassee Super Regional champion

Women's College World Series, runner-up
- Conference: Big 12 Conference

Ranking
- Coaches: No. 10
- Record: 54–14 (20–4 Big 12)
- Head coach: Gerry Glasco (1st season)
- Assistant coaches: Hunter Veach (1st season); Kayla Kowalik (1st season)
- Pitching coach: Tara Archibald (1st season)
- Home stadium: Rocky Johnson Field

2025 Big 12 Conference softball standings
	Conf.						Overall
Team	W		L		T	PCT	W		L		T	PCT
No. 10 Texas Tech ‍†‍‡‍^{y}	20	–	4	–	0	.833	54	–	14	–	0	.794
No. 12 Arizona ‍‍‍^{y}	17	–	7	–	0	.708	48	–	13	–	0	.787
Iowa State ‍‍‍	15	–	9	–	0	.625	31	–	23	–	0	.574
No. 24 Oklahoma State ‍‍‍^{y}	13	–	9	–	0	.591	35	–	20	–	0	.636
Arizona State ‍‍‍^{y}	14	–	10	–	0	.583	35	–	21	–	0	.625
BYU ‍‍‍	13	–	11	–	0	.542	32	–	17	–	0	.653
UCF ‍‍‍^{y}	12	–	12	–	0	.500	35	–	24	–	1	.592
Baylor ‍‍‍	11	–	13	–	0	.458	27	–	27	–	0	.500
Kansas ‍‍‍	6	–	18	–	0	.250	22	–	28	–	0	.440
Utah ‍‍‍	5	–	19	–	0	.208	13	–	40	–	0	.245
Houston ‍‍‍	4	–	18	–	0	.182	22	–	25	–	0	.468
† – Conference champion ‡ – Tournament champion y – Invited to the NCAA Tournament; As of June 6, 2025; Rankings from NFCA/USA Today

The 2025 Texas Tech Red Raiders softball team represented Texas Tech University (TTU) during the 2025 NCAA Division I softball season as a member of the Big 12 Conference. Led by first-year head coach Gerry Glasco, the Red Raiders played their home games at Rocky Johnson Field in Lubbock, Texas.

The Red Raiders won the Big 12 regular-season title for the first time in program history. In the Big 12 tournament, the Red Raiders outscored opponents 26–0 while going a perfect 3–0 in the tournament, winning the Big 12 tournament for the first time in program history, with pitcher NiJaree Canady being named Most Outstanding Player. In the NCAA tournament, Texas Tech hosted a regional for the first time in program history, winning the Lubbock Regional to advance to the program's first Super Regional. Texas Tech swept Florida State in the Tallahassee Super Regional, 2–0, to advance to the Women's College World Series (WCWS) for the first time in program history.

In the WCWS, the Red Raiders defeated Ole Miss in game 1 and UCLA in game 2 to advance to the semifinals. In the semifinals, Texas Tech faced off against Oklahoma, who won the previous four WCWS titles; the Red Raiders won 3–2 to reach the finals. Texas defeated the Red Raiders in three games during the finals.

== Big 12 preseason poll ==
The Big 12's preseason prediction poll was released on January 24, 2025. The Red Raiders were predicted to finish the regular season second in the conference, though they also received two first place votes.

Big 12 preseason poll
Predicted finish	Team	Votes (1st place)
1	Oklahoma State	99 (9)
2	Texas Tech	90 (2)
3	Arizona	81
4	Baylor	75
5	BYU	54
6	Utah	52
7	UCF	51
8	Arizona State	36
9	Kansas	34
10	Iowa State	23
11	Houston	10

== Personnel ==
=== Roster ===
2025 Texas Tech Red Raiders softball roster
Pitchers: 0 Brenlee Gonzales (LHP) – Freshman; 22 Samantha Lincoln (LHP) – Freshman; 24 NiJaree Canady (RHP) – Junior; 55 Bailey Lindemuth (RHP) – Freshman; 75 Chloe Riassetto (LHP) – Junior; Catchers: 12 Anya German – Freshman; 13 Victoria Valdez – Junior; Utility: 21 Alana Johnson – Junior	Outfielders: 2 Demi Elder – Senior; 7 Logan Halleman – Sophomore; 9 Sydney Shiller – Freshman; 42 Mihyia Davis – Junior; 66 Kiley Huffman – Freshman; Infielders: 3 Makayla Garcia – Sophomore; 11 Lauren Allred – (redshirt) Sophomore; 14 Raegan Jennings – Sophomore; 23 Alexa Langeliers – Senior; 32 Hailey Toney – Freshman

=== Coaching staff ===
Name	Position	Seasons at Texas Tech
Gerry Glasco	Head coach	1
Tara Archibald	Associate head coach / Pitching coach	1
Hunter Veach	Assistant coach	1
Kayla Kowalik	Assistant coach	1

== Schedule ==
2025 Texas Tech Red Raiders softball game log: 54–14
Regular season: 42–12

February: 16–5
Date	Time	Opponent	Rank	Stadium	Score	Win	Loss	Save	Attendance	Overall	Big 12	Ref
February 6	6:00 p.m.	vs. Marshall*	No. 13	Eddie C. Moore Complex; Clearwater, FL	**W** 2–0	**Canady** (1–0)	Feringa (0–1)	**Riassetto** (1)	N/A	1–0	—	
February 7	4:00 p.m.	vs. No. 24 Mississippi State*	No. 13	Eddie C. Moore Complex; Clearwater, FL	**L** 1–3 (8)	Chaffin (1–0)	**Canady** (1–1)	—	N/A	1–1	—	
February 7	7:00 p.m.	vs. Penn State*	No. 13	Eddie C. Moore Complex; Clearwater, FL	**W** 10–9	**Gonzales** (1–0)	Britton (0–2)	—	199	2–1	—	
February 8	3:00 p.m.	vs. No. 19 Nebraska*	No. 13	Eddie C. Moore Complex; Clearwater, FL	**W** 6–5	**Gonzales** (2–0)	Bahl (1–1)	—	N/A	3–1	—	
February 8	6:00 p.m.	vs. Iowa*	No. 13	Eddie C. Moore Complex; Clearwater, FL	**W** 11–0 (5)	**Canady** (2–1)	Ojo (0–1)	—	N/A	4–1	—	
February 9	12:00 p.m.	vs. Kennesaw State*	No. 13	Eddie C. Moore Complex; Clearwater, FL	**W** 3–0	**Canady** (3–1)	Friedel (0–1)	**Lincoln** (1)	968	5–1	—	
February 14	1:30 p.m.	vs. UMass*	No. 11	McCombs Field; Austin, TX	**W** 17–4 (5)	**Lincoln** (1–0)	Bolton (1–1)	—	178	6–1	—	
February 14	6:30 p.m.	at No. 1 Texas*	No. 11	McCombs Field; Austin, TX	**L** 1–2 (9)	Kavan (3–0)	**Canady** (3–2)	—	892	6–2	—	
February 15	11:00 a.m.	vs. UMass*	No. 11	McCombs Field; Austin, TX	**W** 3–0	**Lincoln** (2–0)	Horton (1–2)	—	78	7–2	—	
February 15	1:30 p.m.	vs. Maryland*	No. 11	McCombs Field; Austin, TX	**W** 4–1	**Canady** (4–2)	Godfrey (1–1)	—	289	8–2	—	
February 16	12:30 p.m.	at No. 1 Texas*	No. 11	McCombs Field; Austin, TX	**L** 0–11 (5)	Kavan (4–0)	**Lincoln** (2–1)	—	1,238	8–3	—	
February 21	1:00 p.m.	Detroit Mercy*	No. 12	Rocky Johnson Field; Lubbock, TX	**W** 10–0	**Lindemuth** (1–0)	Kavanaugh (0–4)	—	100	9–3	—	
February 21	3:00 p.m.	Detroit Mercy*	No. 12	Rocky Johnson Field; Lubbock, TX	**W** 20–0 (5)	**Riassetto** (1–0)	Keown (0–3)	—	660	10–3	—	
February 22	12:00 p.m.	UIC*	No. 12	Rocky Johnson Field; Lubbock, TX	**W** 15–6 (5)	**Lincoln** (3–1)	Whorley (2–3)	—	883	11–3	—	
February 22	2:30 p.m.	Indiana*	No. 12	Rocky Johnson Field; Lubbock, TX	**W** 8–0 (5)	**Canady** (5–2)	Copeland (1–2)	—	883	12–3	—	
February 23	11:30 a.m.	Indiana*	No. 12	Rocky Johnson Field; Lubbock, TX	**W** 7–2	**Canady** (6–2)	Reyes (3–1)	—	867	13–3	—	
February 23	2:00 p.m.	UTEP*	No. 12	Rocky Johnson Field; Lubbock, TX	**W** 3–0	**Lincoln** (4–1)	Reynolds (1–2)	**Riasetto** (2)	867	14–3	—	
February 24	12:00 p.m.	UTEP*	No. 12	Rocky Johnson Field; Lubbock, TX	**W** 6–1	**Lindemuth** (2–0)	Felder (4–2)	—	596	15–3	—	
February 26	2:00 p.m.	at North Texas*	No. 13	Lovelace Stadium; Denton, TX	**L** 5–6	Smith (1–0)	**Lindemuth** (2–1)	—	415	15–4	—	
February 28	9:00 a.m.	vs. Idaho State*	No. 13	Davis Diamond; College Station, TX	**L** 2–3	Tommasini (2–1)	**Lincoln** (4–2)	—	N/A	15–5	—	
February 28	11:30 a.m.	vs. Princeton*	No. 13	Davis Diamond; College Station, TX	**W** 12–0	**Riassetto** (2–0)	Wright (0–2)	—	N/A	16–5	—	

March: 11–4
Date	Time	Opponent	Rank	Stadium	Score	Win	Loss	Save	Attendance	Overall	Big 12	Ref
March 1	4:30 p.m.	vs. Texas State*	No. 13	Davis Diamond; College Station, TX	**W** 6–0	**Riassetto** (3–0)	Strood (5–2)	—	N/A	17–5	—	
March 1	7:00 p.m.	at No. 6 Texas A&M*	No. 13	Davis Diamond; College Station, TX	**W** 7–2	**Canady** (7–2)	Kennedy (5–2)	—	2,754	18–5	—	
March 2	2:00 p.m.	at No. 6 Texas A&M*	No. 13	Davis Diamond; College Station, TX	**L** 6–7	Sparks (5–0)	**Riassetto** (3–1)	Munnerlyn (1)	2,313	18–6	—	
March 7	6:00 p.m.	No. 15 Oklahoma State	No. 16	Rocky Johnson Field; Lubbock, TX	**W** 9–0 (5)	**Canady** (8–2)	Kutz (7–2)	—	2,122	19–6	1–0	
March 7	8:00 p.m.	No. 15 Oklahoma State	No. 16	Rocky Johnson Field; Lubbock, TX	**W** 2–0	**Riassetto** (4–1)	Meylan (8–1)	**Canady** (1)	2,122	20–6	2–0	
March 9	12:00 p.m.	No. 15 Oklahoma State	No. 16	Rocky Johnson Field; Lubbock, TX	**L** 1–10 (5)	Meylan (9–1)	**Canady** (8–3)	—	1,202	20–7	2–1	
March 14	6:30 p.m.	at Baylor	No. 14	Getterman Stadium; Waco, TX	**W** 4–1	**Canady** (9–3)	Walker (2–4)	—	1,254	21–7	3–1	
March 15	2:00 p.m.	at Baylor	No. 14	Getterman Stadium; Waco, TX	**W** 14–0	**Riassetto** (5–1)	Ross (3–6)	—	1,234	22–7	4–1	
March 16	1:00 p.m.	at Baylor	No. 14	Getterman Stadium; Waco, TX	**W** 3–0	**Canady** (10–3)	Walker (2–5)	—	1,246	23–7	5–1	
March 21	5:00 p.m.	at No. 11 South Carolina*	No. 12	Beckham Field; Columbia, SC	**L** 2–5	Gress (6–2)	**Riassetto** (5–2)	—	830	23–8	—	
March 22	2:00 p.m.	at No. 11 South Carolina*	No. 12	Beckham Field; Columbia, SC	**L** 0–1	Gress (7–2)	**Canady** (10–4)	—	1,210	23–9	—	
March 23	11:00 a.m.	at No. 11 South Carolina*	No. 12	Beckham Field; Columbia, SC	**W** 6–5	**Lincoln**(5–2)	Gress (7–3)	**Canady** (2)	892	24–9	—	
March 28	5:00 p.m.	at Kansas	No. 14	Arrocha Ballpark; Lawrence, KS	**W** 9–0 (5)	**Canady** (11–4)	Ludwig (3–4)	—	1,249	25–9	6–1	
March 29	2:00 p.m.	at Kansas	No. 14	Arrocha Ballpark; Lawrence, KS	**W** 14–3	**Lincoln** (6–2)	Washington (3–3)	—	1,350	26–9	7–1	
March 29	4:30 p.m.	at Kansas	No. 14	Arrocha Ballpark; Lawrence, KS	**W** 4–1	**Canady** (12–4)	Brooks (3–6)	—	880	27–9	8–1	

April: 13–2
Date	Time	Opponent	Rank	Stadium	Score	Win	Loss	Save	Attendance	Overall	Big 12	Ref
April 2	6:00 p.m.	at Abilene Christian*	No. 14	Poly Wells Field; Abilene, TX	**W** 7–3	**Lincoln** (7–2)	Russo (4–15)	—	1,261	28–9	—	
April 4	2:00 p.m.	Utah	No. 14	Rocky Johnson Field; Lubbock, TX	**W** 9–1 (5)	**Canady** (13–4)	Carreon (3–6)	—	1,394	29–9	9–1	
April 4	4:30 p.m.	Utah	No. 14	Rocky Johnson Field; Lubbock, TX	**W** 3–0	**Canady** (14–4)	Maestretti (3–8)	—	1,395	30–9	10–1	
April 6	1:30 p.m.	Utah	No. 14	Rocky Johnson Field; Lubbock, TX	**W** 7–4	**Canady**(15–4)	Carreon (3–7)	—	877	31–9	11–1	
April 11	6:00 p.m.	Houston	No. 14	Rocky Johnson Field; Lubbock, TX	**W** 3–2	**Canady**(16–4)	Lehman (2–4)	—	1,185	32–9	12–1	
April 12	4:00 p.m.	Houston	No. 14	Rocky Johnson Field; Lubbock, TX	**W** 6–2	**Canady** (17–4)	Bodeux (3–4)	**Lincoln** (2)	1,142	33–9	13–1	
April 13	12:00 p.m.	Houston	No. 14	Rocky Johnson Field; Lubbock, TX	**W** 3–0	**Riassetto** (6–2)	Michalak (4–4)	—	1,049	34–9	14–1	
April 17	7:00 p.m.	at No. 12 Arizona	No. 14	Hillenbrand Memorial Stadium; Tucson, AZ	**L** 1–2	Netz (17–4)	**Canady** (17–5)	—	2,581	34–10	14–2	
April 18	7:00 p.m.	at No. 12 Arizona	No. 14	Hillenbrand Memorial Stadium; Tucson, AZ	**W** 10–1 (5)	**Canady** (18–5)	Silva (3–1)	—	2,908	35–10	15–2	
April 19	7:30 p.m.	at No. 12 Arizona	No. 14	Hillenbrand Memorial Stadium; Tucson, AZ	**W** 5–2	**Canady** (19–5)	Netz (17–5)	—	2,616	36–10	16–2	
April 22	5:00 p.m.	North Texas*	No. 11	Rocky Johnson Field; Lubbock, TX	**Canceled**							
April 23	5:00 p.m.	UT Arlington*	No. 11	Rocky Johnson Field; Lubbock, TX	**W** 12–3 (5)	**Lincoln** (8–2)	Gutierrez (4–4)	—	712	37–10	—	
April 26	3:00 p.m.	Arizona State	No. 11	Rocky Johnson Field; Lubbock, TX	**W** 9–0 (5)	**Canady** (20–5)	Lauppe (9–7)	—	2,122	38–10	17–2	
April 26	5:30 p.m.	Arizona State	No. 11	Rocky Johnson Field; Lubbock, TX	**W** 3–0	**Canady** (21–5)	Brown (17–6)	—	2,122	39–10	18–2	
April 27	12:00 p.m.	Arizona State	No. 11	Rocky Johnson Field; Lubbock, TX	**L** 3–7	Brown (18–5)	**Lincoln** (8–3)	—	963	39–11	18–3	
April 29	5:30 p.m.	Abilene Christian*	No. 11	Rocky Johnson Field; Lubbock, TX	**W** 9–0 (5)	**Riassetto** (7–2)	Mueller (1–8)	—	714	40–11	—	

May: 2–1
Date	Time	Opponent	Rank	Stadium	Score	Win	Loss	Save	Attendance	Overall	Big 12	Ref
May 1	6:00 p.m.	at BYU	No. 11	Gail Miller Field; Provo, UT	**W** 9–4	**Canady** (22–5)	Mares (0–2)	—	1,040	41–11	19–3	
May 2	6:00 p.m.	at BYU	No. 11	Gail Miller Field; Provo, UT	**L** 1–2	Villegas (7–2)	**Riassetto** (7–3)	—	1,420	41–12	19–4	
May 3	6:00 p.m.	at BYU	No. 11	Gail Miller Field; Provo, UT	**W** 2–1	**Canady** (23–5)	Korth (15–6)	—	1,608	42–12	20–4	

Post–season: 12–2

Big 12 Tournament: 3–0
Date	Time	Opponent	Rank	Stadium	Score	Win	Loss	Save	Attendance	Overall	B12T	Ref
May 8	1:30 p.m.	vs. (8) Baylor	(1) No. 11	Devon Park; Oklahoma City, OK	**W** 4–0	**Canady** (24–5)	Walker (12–11)	—	N/A	43–12	1–0	
May 9	3:00 p.m.	vs. (5) Arizona State	(1) No. 11	Devon Park; Oklahoma City, OK	**W** 18–0 (5)	**Canady** (25–5)	Lauppe (9–8)	—	N/A	44–12	2–0	
May 10	11:00 a.m.	vs. (2) No. 12 Arizona	(1) No. 11	Devon Park; Oklahoma City, OK	**W** 4–0	**Canady** (26–5)	Maddox (3–2)	—	N/A	45–12	3–0	

Lubbock Regional: 3–0
Date	Time	Opponent	Rank	Stadium	Score	Win	Loss	Save	Attendance	Overall	REG	Ref
May 16	4:30 p.m.	(4) Brown*	(1) No. 10	Rocky Johnson Field; Lubbock, TX	**W** 6–0	**Riassetto** (8–3)	Guevara (20–8)	—	2,122	46–12	1–0	
May 17	1:00 p.m.	(2) Mississippi State*	(1) No. 10	Rocky Johnson Field; Lubbock, TX	**W** 10–1 (6)	**Canady** (27–5)	Everett (10–2)	—	2,178	47–12	2–0	
May 18	2:00 p.m.	(2) Mississippi State*	(1) No. 10	Rocky Johnson Field; Lubbock, TX	**W** 9–6	**Canady** (28–5)	Chaffin (23–10)	**Riasetto** (3)	2,178	48–12	3–0	

Tallahassee Super Regional: 2–0
Date	Time	Opponent	Rank	Stadium	Score	Win	Loss	Save	Attendance	Overall	SREG	Ref
May 22	6:00 p.m.	No. 5 Florida State*	No. 10	JoAnne Graf Field; Tallahassee, FL	**W** 3–0	**Canady** (29–5)	Danley (14–2)	—	1,404	49–12	1–0	
May 23	2:00 p.m.	No. 5 Florida State*	No. 10	JoAnne Graf Field; Tallahassee, FL	**W** 2–1	**Canady** (30–5)	Apsel (12–2)	—	1,396	50–12	2–0	

Women's College World Series: 4–2
Date	Time	Opponent	Rank	Stadium	Score	Win	Loss	Save	Attendance	Overall	WCWS	Ref
May 29	6:00 p.m.	vs. No. 17 Ole Miss*	No. 10	Devon Park; Oklahoma City, OK	**W** 1–0	**Canady** (31–5)	Binford (11–4)	—	N/A	51–12	1–0	
May 31	6:00 p.m.	vs. No. 9 UCLA*	No. 10	Devon Park; Oklahoma City, OK	**W** 3–1	**Canady** (32–5)	Tinsley (15–5)	—	12,595	52–12	2–0	
June 2	6:00 p.m.	vs. No. 2 Oklahoma*	No. 10	Devon Park; Oklahoma City, OK	**W** 3–2	**Canady** (33–5)	Landry (25–6)	—	10,658	53–12	3–0	
June 4	7:00 p.m.	vs. No. 1 Texas*	No. 10	Devon Park; Oklahoma City, OK	**L** 1–2	Kavan (27–5)	**Canady** (33–6)	—	12,109	53–13	3–1	
June 5	7:50 p.m.	vs. No. 1 Texas*	No. 10	Devon Park; Oklahoma City, OK	**W** 4–3	**Canady** (34–6)	Salmon (7–2)	—	12,220	54–13	4–1	
June 6	7:00 p.m.	vs. No. 1 Texas*	No. 10	Devon Park; Oklahoma City, OK	**L** 4–10	Kavan (28–5)	**Canady** (34–7)	—	12,269	54–14	4–2	

Legend: = Win = Loss = Canceled
Bold = Texas Tech team member

* indicates a non-conference game. All rankings from NFCA on the date of the contest. (#) Tournament seedings in parentheses. All times are in central time.

== Rankings ==
Ranking movements Legend: ██ Increase in ranking ██ Decrease in ranking
	Week															
Poll	Pre	1	2	3	4	5	6	7	8	9	10	11	12	13	14	Final
NFCA / USA Today	13	11	12	13	16	14	12	14	14	14	14	11	11	11	10	
Softball America	9	8	13	14	16	12	12	13	14	14	14	11	10	9	9	
ESPN.com/USA Softball	10	8	12	13	15	12	12	13	14	14	14	12	11	11	10	
D1Softball	13	11	14	15	18	11	11	16	14	14	14	11	9	9	9	
