= 2025 Michigan Wolverines softball team =

American college softball season

2025 Michigan Wolverines softball

Big Ten tournament champion

NCAA Austin Regional
- Conference: Big Ten Conference
- Record: 39–21 (11–11 Big Ten)
- Head coach: Bonnie Tholl (3rd season)
- Assistant coaches: Jennifer Brundage (27th season); Amanda Chidester (3rd season); Faith Canfield (4th season)
- Home stadium: Alumni Field

2025 Big Ten Conference softball standings
	Conf.						Overall
Team	W		L		T	PCT	W		L		T	PCT
No. 6 Oregon ‍†‍‍^{y}	19	–	3	–	0	.864	54	–	10	–	0	.844
No. 19 Nebraska ‍‍‍^{y}	17	–	5	–	0	.773	43	–	15	–	0	.741
No. 9 UCLA ‍‍‍^{y}	17	–	5	–	0	.773	55	–	13	–	0	.809
Northwestern ‍‍‍^{y}	16	–	6	–	0	.727	30	–	20	–	1	.598
No. 22 Ohio State ‍‍‍^{y}	16	–	6	–	0	.727	45	–	14	–	1	.758
Iowa ‍‍‍	15	–	7	–	0	.682	35	–	18	–	0	.660
Washington ‍‍‍^{y}	12	–	9	–	0	.571	35	–	19	–	0	.648
Michigan ‍‍‡‍^{y}	11	–	11	–	0	.500	39	–	21	–	0	.650
Wisconsin ‍‍‍	11	–	11	–	0	.500	33	–	21	–	0	.611
Indiana ‍‍‍^{y}	11	–	12	–	0	.478	34	–	20	–	0	.630
Penn State ‍‍‍	10	–	12	–	0	.455	25	–	27	–	0	.481
Purdue ‍‍‍	9	–	14	–	0	.391	30	–	23	–	0	.566
Illinois ‍‍‍	6	–	15	–	0	.286	22	–	28	–	0	.440
Michigan State ‍‍‍	6	–	16	–	0	.273	16	–	29	–	0	.356
Minnesota ‍‍‍	5	–	17	–	0	.227	20	–	30	–	0	.400
Maryland ‍‍‍	3	–	19	–	0	.136	18	–	31	–	0	.367
Rutgers ‍‍‍	3	–	19	–	0	.136	20	–	36	–	0	.357
† – Conference champion ‡ – Tournament champion y – Invited to the NCAA Tournament; As of June 1, 2025; Rankings from NFCA/USA Today

The 2025 Michigan Wolverines softball team was an American college softball team that represented the University of Michigan during the 2025 NCAA Division I softball season. The Wolverines were led by head coach Bonnie Tholl in her third season, and played their home games at Alumni Field in Ann Arbor, Michigan. The Wolverines won the 2025 Big Ten softball tournament, and advanced to the 2025 NCAA Division I softball tournament.

== Previous season ==
The Wolverines finished the 2024 season 43–18 overall, and 18–5 in the Big Ten, finishing in second place in their conference. Michigan received an at-large bid to the 2024 NCAA Division I softball tournament and were defeated in the Regional Finals by Oklahoma State.

== Roster ==
2025 Michigan Wolverines softball team
Players
Coaches

#	Pos.	Name	Bats/throws	Height	Year	High school/junior college	Home town
1	OF	Ellie Sieler (C)	L/L	5 ft 5 in (1.65 m)	Sr	Monroe	Monroe, MI
2	U	Lauren Putz	L/R	5 ft 7 in (1.7 m)	Fr	Xavier College Preparatory	Phoenix, AZ
3	OF	Megan Beemer	L/L	5 ft 5 in (1.65 m)	Fr	Hudsonville	Hudsonville, MI
4	INF	Ryleigh Carricaburu	R/R	5 ft 9 in (1.75 m)	GS	Woodcrest Christian	Riverside, CA
5	INF	Kaylee Rodriguez	R/R	5 ft 5 in (1.65 m)	Sr	Doral Academy	Miami, FL
7	RHP	Maddie Erickson	L/R	5 ft 5 in (1.65 m)	Jr	Wilsonville	Wilsonville, OR
8	INF	Madi Ramey	L/R	5 ft 6 in (1.68 m)	Jr	Allen Park	Allen Park, MI
10	INF	Andee Dircks	R/R	5 ft 9 in (1.75 m)	Fr	Chapin	Chapin, SC
11	U	Erin Hoehn	R/R	5 ft 7 in (1.7 m)	So	North Posey	Poseyville, IN
12	U	Jenna Ouellette	R/R	5 ft 6 in (1.68 m)	Fr	Chelsea	Chelsea, MI
13	OF	Jenissa Conway	R/R	5 ft 8 in (1.73 m)	So	Marysville	Olivehurst, CA
14	INF	Janelle Ilacqua	R/R	5 ft 5 in (1.65 m)	Jr	Catawba Ridge	Fort Mill, SC
15	U	Haley Ferguson	R/R	5 ft 5 in (1.65 m)	Fr	Beavercreek	Fairborn, OH
16	OF	Cece Thorington	R/R	5 ft 7 in (1.7 m)	Fr	Pinckney	Pinckney, MI
17	INF	Lexi Dellamonica	R/R	5 ft 6 in (1.68 m)	So	Queen Creek	Queen Creek, AZ
18	RHP	Lauren Derkowski (C)	R/R	5 ft 8 in (1.73 m)	Sr	York Community	Elmhurst, IL
19	RHP	Reganne Bennett	R/R	5 ft 10 in (1.78 m)	So	Novi	Novi, MI
20	U	Lilly Vallimont	R/R	5 ft 6 in (1.68 m)	RS So	Trenton	Trenton, MI
21	RHP	Kat Meyers	R/R	5 ft 8 in (1.73 m)	Fr	Anthony Wayne	Waterville, OH
22	RHP	Emerson Aiken	R/R	5 ft 8 in (1.73 m)	Sr	Glen Allen	Henrico, VA
23	INF	Avery Fantucci	R/R	5 ft 8 in (1.73 m)	Jr	Marist	Atlanta. GA
24	U	Ava Costales	R/R	5 ft 4 in (1.63 m)	So	Lakeview	St. Clair Shores, MI
25	OF	Ella Stephenson	L/R	5 ft 9 in (1.75 m)	So	Algonac	Algonac, MI
32	INF	Ella McVey (C)	L/R	5 ft 7 in (1.7 m)	Sr	Dowling Catholic	Des Moines, IA
44	U	Indian Langford	L/R	5 ft 2 in (1.57 m)	Jr	Poway	Poway, CA

Head coach

Bonnie Tholl (Michigan)

Assistant coach(es)

Jennifer Brundage (UCLA)
Amanda Chidester (Michigan
Faith Canfield (Michigan)

Legend

- (C) Team captain
- (S) Suspended
- (I) Ineligible
- Injured
- Current redshirt

Roster

== Schedule and results ==
2025 Michigan Wolverines Softball Game Log
Regular season (34–19)

February (10–6)
Date	Opponent	Rank	Stadium Site	Score	Win	Loss	Save	Attendance	Overall Record	B1G Record
February 7	vs. Delaware; USF Tournament		USF Softball Stadium; Tampa, FL	2–8	Kerwood (2–1)	**Hoehn** (0–1)	—	723	0–1	—
February 7	at USF; USF Tournament		USF Softball Stadium; Tampa, FL	1–0	**Derkowski** (1–0)	Long (0–1)	—	987	1–1	—
February 8	vs. Illinois State; USF Tournament		USF Softball Stadium; Tampa, FL	4–0	**Derkowski** (2–0)	McLeod (0–2)	—	376	2–1	—
February 8	vs. No. 3 Florida; USF Tournament		USF Softball Stadium; Tampa, FL	1–13 ^{(5)}	Rothrock (2–0)	**Hoehn** (0–2)	—	1,054	2–2	—
February 9	vs. Georgia Southern; USF Tournament		USF Softball Stadium; Tampa, FL	0–2	Johnson (1–1)	**Ferguson** (0–1)	—	137	2–3	—
February 13	at No. 10 Georgia; Red & Black Showcase		Jack Turner Stadium; Athens, GA	2–3	Backes (3–0)	**Derkowski** (2–1)	Roelling (1)	1.501	2–4	—
February 14	vs. Longwood; Red & Black Showcase		Jack Turner Stadium; Athens, GA	8–0 ^{(5)}	**Derkowski** (3–1)	Kirkland (1–3)	—	—	3–4	—
February 14	vs. Western Carolina; Red & Black Showcase		Jack Turner Stadium; Athens, GA	6–0	**Hoehn** (1–2)	Batson (1–2)	—	—	4–4	—
February 15	at Georgia; Red & Black Showcase		Jack Turner Stadium; Athens, GA	Cancelled						
February 16	vs. Georgia State; Red & Black Showcase		Jack Turner Stadium; Athens, GA	11–1 ^{(5)}	**Hoehn** (2–2)	Stephens (0–3)	—	264	5–4	—
February 21	vs. Kent State; South Florida Showdown		USF Softball Stadium; Tampa, FL	8–3	**Hoehn** (3–2)	Pochie (0–3)	**Derkowski**	562	6–4	—
February 21	at USF; South Florida Showdown		USF Softball Stadium; Tampa, FL	5–4	**Hoehn** (4–2)	Dixon (5–1)	—	489	7–4	—
February 22	vs. Louisville; South Florida Showdown		USF Softball Stadium; Tampa, FL	3–5	Mullen (1–0)	**Derkowski** (3–2)	—	—	7–5	—
February 22	vs. Troy; South Florida Showdown		USF Softball Stadium; Tampa, FL	10–0 ^{(5)}	**Hoehn** (5–2)	Holt (3–2)	—	—	8–5	—
February 27	at No. 8 Duke		Duke Softball Stadium; Durham, NC	1–2	Drogemuller (5–1)	**Derkowski** (3–3)	—	—	8–6	—
February 28	vs. Queens; The Raleigh Times		Curtis & Jacqueline Dail Softball Stadium; Raleigh, NC	10–2	**Hoehn** (6–2)	Craver (0–2)	—	111	9–6	—
February 28	at NC State; The Raleigh Times		Curtis & Jacqueline Dail Softball Stadium; Raleigh, NC	5–3	**Derkowski** (4–3)	Gore (2–2)	—	279	10–6	—

March (17–3)
Date	Opponent	Rank	Stadium Site	Score	Win	Loss	Save	Attendance	Overall Record	B1G Record
March 1	vs. Queens; The Raleigh Times		Curtis & Jacqueline Dail Softball Stadium; Raleigh, NC	10–1 ^{(5)}	**Ferguson** (1–1)	Craver (0–3)	—	119	11–6	—
March 1	vs. UNC Wilmington; The Raleigh Times		Curtis & Jacqueline Dail Softball Stadium; Raleigh, NC	2–1	**Hoehn** (7–2)	Huddleston (7–2)	**Derkowski** (1)	98	12–6	—
March 2	vs. UNC Wilmington; The Raleigh Times		Curtis & Jacqueline Dail Softball Stadium; Raleigh, NC	9–3	**Derkowski** (5–3)	Eckert (1–2)	—	73	13–6	—
March 4	at North Carolina		Williams Field at Anderson Stadium; Chapel Hill, NC	2–0	**Hoehn** (8–2)	Dark (8–3)	**Derkowski** (2)	213	14–6	—
March 5	at East Carolina		Max R. Joyner Family Stadium; Greenville, NC	1–2	Frost (5–5)	**Derkowski** (5–4)	Apple (1)	112	14–7	—
March 7	vs. North Carolina Central		UNCG Softball Stadium; Greensboro, NC	11–0 ^{(5)}	**Hoehn** (9–2)	Davis (1–7)	—	78	15–7	—
March 7	at UNC Greensboro		UNCG Softball Stadium; Greensboro, NC	9–0 ^{(5)}	**Derkowski** (6–4)	Chartrand (2–2)	—	163	16–7	—
March 8	vs. North Carolina Central		UNCG Softball Stadium; Greensboro, NC	8–0 ^{(5)}	**Meyers** (1–0)	Krupey (0–7)	—	111	17–7	—
March 8	at UNC Greensboro		UNCG Softball Stadium; Greensboro, NC	9–2	**Hoehn** (10–2)	Ward (7–3)	—	302	18–7	—
March 14	vs. Princeton; Mizzou Invitational		Mizzou Softball Stadium; Columbia, MO	8–4	**Derkowski** (7–4)	Shaw (3–5)	—	—	19–7	—
March 15	at Missouri; Mizzou Invitational		Mizzou Softball Stadium; Columbia, MO	3–7	McCann (6–4)	**Derkowski** (7–5)	—	—	19–8	—
March 15	vs. South Dakota State; Mizzou Invitational		Mizzou Softball Stadium; Columbia, MO	5–0	**Hoehn** (11–2)	Vacanti (1–5)	—	—	20–8	—
March 20	vs. Maryland		Devon Park; Oklahoma City, OK	8–0 ^{(5)}	**Derkowski** (8–5)	Godfrey (2–4)	—	350	21–8	1–0
March 21	vs. Maryland		Devon Park; Oklahoma City, OK	5–2	**Hoehn** (12–2)	Shearer (2–4)	**Derkowski** (3)	200	22–8	2–0
March 22	vs. Wisconsin		Devon Park; Oklahoma City, OK	6–2	**Derkowski** (9–5)	Salo (10–5)	—	300	23–8	3–0
March 23	vs. Wisconsin		Devon Park; Oklahoma City, OK	8–1	**Derkowski** (10–5)	Felci (0–1)	—	300	24–8	4–0
March 25	Western Michigan		Alumni Field; Ann Arbor, MI	12–4	**Ferguson** (2–1)	Salyer (0–4)	—	780	25–8	—
March 28	Michigan State		Alumni Field; Ann Arbor, MI	3–4	Taylor (1–2)	**Derkowski** (10–6)	Cassady (1)	1,457	25–9	4–1
March 29	Michigan State		Alumni Field; Ann Arbor, MI	15–3 ^{(5)}	**Hoehn** (13–2)	Schuler (5–10)	—	1,713	26–9	5–1
March 29	Michigan State		Alumni Field; Ann Arbor, MI	9–8 ^{(8)}	**Hoehn** (14–2)	Taylor (1–3)	—	1,713	27–9	6–1

April (5–9)
Date	Opponent	Rank	Stadium Site	Score	Win	Loss	Save	Attendance	Overall Record	B1G Record
April 4	at No. 6 Oregon		Jane Sanders Stadium; Eugene, OR	2–3	Sokolsky (10–1)	**Derkowski** (10–7)	—	2,028	27–10	6–2
April 5	at No. 6 Oregon		Jane Sanders Stadium; Eugene, OR	4–5	Sokolsky (11–1)	**Derkowski** (10–8)	—	—	27–11	6–3
April 6	at No. 6 Oregon		Jane Sanders Stadium; Eugene, OR	1–9 ^{(5)}	Grein (19–1)	**Derkowski** (10–9)	—	2,218	27–12	6–4
April 9	Central Michigan		Alumni Field; Ann Arbor, MI	6–2	**Hoehn** (15–2)	Compau (5–7)	—	927	28–12	—
April 12	Rutgers		Alumni Field; Ann Arbor, MI	3–1	**Derkowski** (11–9)	Harrison (11–13)	**Hoehn** (1)	1,804	29–12	7–4
April 13	Rutgers		Alumni Field; Ann Arbor, MI	11–3 ^{(6)}	**Hoehn** (16–2)	Depew (0–13)	**Meyers** (1)	1,886	30–12	8–4
April 14	Rutgers		Alumni Field; Ann Arbor, MI	8–4	**Derkowski** (12–9)	Harrison (11–14)	**Hoehn** (1)	867	31–12	9–4
April 18	at No. 24 Ohio State		Buckeye Field; Columbus, OH	3–4	Boutte (16–7)	**Derkowski** (12–10)	—	1,455	31–13	9–5
April 18	at No. 24 Ohio State		Buckeye Field; Columbus, OH	4–7	Kay (10–3)	**Hoehn** (16–3)	—	1,337	31–14	9–6
April 20	at No. 24 Ohio State		Buckeye Field; Columbus, OH	7–15	Kay (11–3)	**Derkowski** (12–11)	—	1,017	31–15	9–7
April 22	Oakland		Alumni Field; Ann Arbor, MI	6–1	**Aiken** (1–0)	Balcom (6–11)	—	916	32–15	—
April 26	No. 7 UCLA		Alumni Field; Ann Arbor, MI	3–5	Tinsley (11–3)	**Derkowski** (12–12)	Fisher (1)	2,432	32–16	9–8
April 27	No. 7 UCLA		Alumni Field; Ann Arbor, MI	3–4 ^{(8)}	Fisher (15–0)	**Hoehn** (16–4)	—	2,443	32–17	9–9
April 28	No. 7 UCLA		Alumni Field; Ann Arbor, MI	8–12	Fisher (16–0)	**Hoehn** (16–5)	—	1,171	32–18	9–10

May (2–1)
Date	Opponent	Rank	Stadium Site	Score	Win	Loss	Save	Attendance	Overall Record	B1G Record
May 2	at Minnesota		Jane Sage Cowles Stadium; Minneapolis, MN	0–4	Schwartz (10–14)	**Hoehn** (16–6)	—	849	32–19	9–11
May 3	at Minnesota		Jane Sage Cowles Stadium; Minneapolis, MN	8–0 ^{(5)}	**Derkowski** (13–12)	Schwartz (10–15)	—	974	33–19	10–11
May 4	at Minnesota		Jane Sage Cowles Stadium; Minneapolis, MN	3–0	**Derkowski** (14–12)	Schwartz (10–16)	—	920	34–19	11–11

Postseason (5–2)

Big Ten Tournament (4–0)
Date	Opponent	Rank	Site/Stadium	Score	Win	Loss	Save	Attendance	Overall Record	B1GT Record
May 7	Wisconsin		Bittinger Stadium; West Lafayette, IN	3–2	**Derkowski** (15–12)	Jacobson (12–6)	—	450	35–19	1–0
May 8	No. 4 Oregon		Bittinger Stadium; West Lafayette, IN	5–0	**Hoehn** (17–6)	Sokolsky (15–3)	—	500	36–19	2–0
May 9	Purdue		Bittinger Stadium; West Lafayette, IN	4–2	**Derkowski** (16–12)	Gossett (11–9)	**Hoehn** (3)	1,600	37–19	3–0
May 10	No. 9 UCLA		Bittinger Stadium; West Lafayette, IN	2–0	**Derkowski** (17–12)	Fisher (16–2)	**Hoehn** (4)	1,278	38–19	4–0

Austin Regional (1–2)
Date	Opponent	Rank	Site/stadium	Score	Win	Loss	Save	Attendance	Overall record	Regional record
May 16	vs. UCF		Red and Charline McCombs Field; Austin, TX	4–3	**Hoehn** (18–6)	Vega (13–6)	**Derkowski** (3)	—	39–19	1–0
May 17	vs. No. 3 Texas		Red and Charline McCombs Field; Austin, TX	4–16 ^{(5)}	Kavan (22–4)	**Derkowski** (17–13)	—	1,293	39–20	1–1
May 17	vs. UCF		Red and Charline McCombs Field; Austin, TX	8–10	Vega (14–6)	**Hoehn** (18–7)	—	361	39–21	1–2

- Win
- Loss
- Postponement
- Bold: Wolverines team member
- Rankings from NFCA.
- (#) Tournament seedings in parentheses.

== Rankings ==
Ranking movements Legend: ██ Increase in ranking ██ Decrease in ranking — = Not ranked RV = Received votes
	Week																
Poll	Pre	1	2	3	4	5	6	7	8	9	10	11	12	13	14	15	Final
NFCA / USA Today	RV	—	—	—	—	—	—	—	—	—	—	—	—	—	RV		
Softball America	23	—	—	—	—	—	—	—	—	—	—	—	—	—	—		
ESPN.com/USA Softball	22	RV	—	—	—	—	—	—	—	—	—	—	—	—	25		
D1Softball	20	—	—	—	—	—	—	—	—	—	—	—	—	—	—		
