= 2025 NCAA Division I softball rankings =

2025 NCAA Division I softball season
- Duration: Feb 8 – June 6, 2025
- Preseason No. 1: Texas (USA Today & ESPN); Florida (D1Softball & Softball America)
- Defending Champions: Oklahoma
- TV partner/s: ESPN

NCAA Tournament
- Duration: May 16 – June 6, 2025
- Most conference bids: 14 – SEC

Women's College World Series
- Duration: May 29 – June 6, 2025
- Champions: Texas (1st title)
- Runners-up: Texas Tech (1st WCWS Appearance)
- Winning Coach: Mike White (1st title)
- WCWS MOP: Teagan Kavan (Texas)

Seasons
- ← 2024 2026 →

The following human polls make up the 2025 NCAA Division I women's softball rankings. The NFCA/USA Today Poll is voted on by a panel of 32 Division I softball coaches. The NFCA/USA Today poll, the Softball America poll, the ESPN.com/USA Softball Collegiate rankings, and D1Softball rank the top 25 teams nationally.

== Legend ==
	Increase in ranking
	Decrease in ranking
	Not ranked previous week
Italics	Number of first place votes
(#-#)	Win-loss record
т	Tied with team above or below also with this symbol

== NFCA/USA Today ==
	Preseason Jan 28	Week 1 Feb 11	Week 2 Feb 18	Week 3 Feb 25	Week 4 Mar 4	Week 5 Mar 11	Week 6 Mar 18	Week 7 Mar 25	Week 8 Apr 1	Week 9 Apr 8	Week 10 Apr 15	Week 11 Apr 22	Week 12 Apr 29	Week 13 May 6	Week 14 May 13	Final Jun 10	
1.	Texas (15)	Texas (6–0) (24)	Texas (11–0) (30)	Texas (15–1) (15)	Texas (20–1) (22)	Oklahoma (22–0) (18)	Oklahoma (26–0) (23)	Texas (31–2) (16)	Texas (34–3) (29)	Texas (37–3) (30)	Texas A&M (37–5) (24)	Texas A&M (39–6) (16)	Oklahoma (42–5) (30)	Texas A&M (43–9) (17)	Texas A&M (45–9) (27)	Texas (56–12) (31)	1.
2.	Oklahoma (10)	Florida (6–0) (6)	Oklahoma (10–0) (1)	Oklahoma (12–0) (9)	Oklahoma (19–0) (5)	Texas (24–1) (13)	Texas (28–1) (8)	Oklahoma (29–1) (14)	Oklahoma (31–3)	Oklahoma (34–3)	Oklahoma (36–4) (2)	Texas (41–6) (5)	Texas A&M (41–8)	Oklahoma (43–7) (10)	Oklahoma (45–7) (4)	Texas Tech (54–14)	2.
3.	Florida (6)	Oklahoma (6–0) (1)	Florida (13–1)	Florida (18–1) (6)	Florida (23–1) (4)	Florida (26–2)	LSU (27–1)	LSU (29–2)	Florida (33–5)	Texas A&M (34–5) (1)	Texas (39–5) (5)	Oklahoma (39–5)	Oregon (44–5) (1)	Texas (45–9) (2)	Texas (46–10)	Oklahoma (52–9)	3.
4.	Oklahoma State	UCLA (5–0)	UCLA (9–1)	UCLA (14–2)	LSU (18–1)	LSU (23–1)	Florida (27–4)	Florida (30–4)	Texas A&M (31–5) (1)	Oregon (35–3)	Tennessee (34–9)	Tennessee (37–9)	Texas (42–9)	Oregon (47–6) (1)	Arkansas (40–12)	Tennessee (47–17)	4.
5.	UCLA	Texas A&M (5–0)	Tennessee (10–1)	LSU (14–0) (1)	Texas A&M (20–2)	Texas A&M (21–4)	Texas A&M (24–4)	Texas A&M (26–5)	LSU (31–4)	LSU (34–5)	Oregon (38–4)	Oregon (41–5)	Tennessee (39–11)	Tennessee (40–13)	Florida State (46–9)	Oregon (54–10)	5.
6.	Tennessee	Tennessee (5–1)	LSU (10–0)	Texas A&M (15–1)	UCLA (18–4)	UCLA (23–4)	UCLA (27–4)	Oregon (29–3)	Oregon (31–3)	Florida (34–8)	UCLA (40–5)	Florida State (40–6)	UCLA (44–7)	Florida State (44–8)	Oregon (47–7)	UCLA (55–13)	6.
7.	Duke	LSU (5–0)	Texas A&M (9–1)	Tennessee (13–3)	Tennessee (19–3)	Tennessee (21–4)	Tennessee (25–4)	Florida State (29–5)т	Tennessee (29–7)	Tennessee (32–8)	Florida State (40–6)	UCLA (41–7)	Florida State (42–7)	Arkansas (38–11) (1)т	Tennessee (40–14)	Florida (48–17)	7.
8.	Texas A&M	Florida State (4–1)	Florida State (8–1)	Duke (13–3)	Florida State (16–3)	Oregon (23–2)	Oregon (26–3)	UCLA (28–5)т	Florida State (33–5)	UCLA (36–4)	Florida (37–9)	Florida (39–10)	Arkansas (36–10)	Florida (43–13)т	Florida (43–14)	Ole Miss (42–21)	8.
9.	Florida State	Oklahoma State (2–2)	Georgia (9–0)	Florida State (11–3)	Arizona (21–2)	South Carolina (20–3)	Florida State (25–5)	Tennessee (26–6)	UCLA (32–5)	Florida State (36–6)	LSU (35–8)	Arkansas (34–9)	Florida (42–11)	UCLA (47–9)	UCLA (49–10)	Arkansas (44–14)	9.
10.	LSU	Georgia (5–0)	Arkansas (10–0)	Georgia (14–0)	Arkansas (19–1)	Florida State (20–6)	Arizona (26–4)	South Carolina (24–6)	South Carolina (27–7)	South Carolina (30–8)	Virginia Tech (36–5)	LSU (36–10)	LSU (38–11)	LSU (40–13)	Texas Tech (45–12)	Florida State (49–12)	10.
11.	Alabama	Texas Tech (5–1)	Duke (7–3)	Arkansas (14–1)	South Carolina (19–0)	Arizona (22–4)	South Carolina (22–5)	Arizona (29–5)	Arizona (31–6)	Virginia Tech (32–5)	Arkansas (31–9)	Texas Tech (36–10)	Texas Tech (36–10)	Texas Tech (39–11)	LSU (41–14)	Clemson (48–14)	11.
12.	Georgia	Duke (3–2)	Texas Tech (8–3)	Arizona (15–2)	Oregon (20–1)	Arkansas (20–3)	Texas Tech (23–7)	Arkansas (23–6)	Arkansas (26–7)	Arkansas (28–8)	Arizona (36–7)	Arizona (37–9)	Arizona (40–10)	Arizona (43–10)	Arizona (45–11)	South Carolina (44–17)	12.
13.	Texas Tech	Arkansas (5–0)	Arizona (10–1)	Texas Tech (13–3)	Georgia (18–2)	Georgia (19–4)	Georgia (21–6)	Stanford (23–3)	Virginia Tech (28–5)	Arizona (33–7)	South Carolina (32–10)	South Carolina (34–11)	Virginia Tech (39–8)	Virginia Tech (40–10)	Clemson (44–12)	Nebraska (43–15)	13.
14.	Arkansas	Alabama (4–1)	Oklahoma State (5–4)	Oregon (15–1)	Duke (14–6)	Texas Tech (20–7)	Arkansas (20–6)	Texas Tech (24–9)	Texas Tech (27–9)	Texas Tech (31–9)	Texas Tech (34–9)	Virginia Tech (37–7)	South Carolina (36–13)	South Carolina (39–14)	South Carolina (40–15)	Texas A&M (48–11)	14.
15.	Missouri	Arizona (5–1)	Virginia Tech (8–2)	Virginia Tech (12–3)	Oklahoma State (14–4)	Oklahoma State (16–6)	Oklahoma State (17–6)	Georgia (23–8)	Stanford (24–6)	Stanford (26–8)	Stanford (29–8)	Stanford (32–9)	Clemson (41–12)	Clemson (41–12)	Virginia Tech (41–11)	Alabama (40–23)	15.
16.	Arizona	Missouri (4–1)	Nebraska (8–2)	Oklahoma State (7–4)	Texas Tech (18–6)	Duke (17–7)	Virginia Tech (23–5)	Virginia Tech (25–5)	Georgia (25–10)	Mississippi State (31–10)	Mississippi State (33–11)	Ole Miss (33–12)	Stanford (35–10)	Stanford (39–10)	Stanford (40–11)	Arizona (48–13)	16.
17.	Virginia Tech	Virginia Tech (5–0)	Mississippi State (9–1)	Stanford (12–2)	Virginia Tech (17–4)	Virginia Tech (19–5)	Stanford (20–3)	Oklahoma State (19–7)	Mississippi State (29–8)	Oklahoma State (23–11)	Ole Miss (31–11)	Mississippi State (33–14)	Ole Miss (34–14)	Mississippi State (35–15)	Ole Miss (37–17)	Liberty (50–15)	17.
18.	Stanford	Nebraska (3–2)	Stanford (9–0)	Nebraska (12–4)	Auburn (19–1)	Stanford (17–3)	Mississippi State (24–5)	Mississippi State (27–6)	Oklahoma State (21–9)	Georgia (25–13)	Nebraska (31–10)	Nebraska (33–11)	Mississippi State (33–14)	Ole Miss (35–16)	Mississippi State (37–17)	Virginia Tech (43–13)	18.
19.	Nebraska	Mississippi State (4–1)	Oregon (10–1)	South Carolina (15–0)	Stanford (14–3)	Mississippi State (21–3)	Duke (19–9)	Ole Miss (26–6)	Ole Miss (28–6)	Ole Miss (29–9)	Duke (31–13)	Clemson (37–12)	Alabama (35–18)	Nebraska (38–12)	Nebraska (39–13)	LSU (42–16)	19.
20.	Baylor	Stanford (4–0)	Auburn (11–0)	Auburn (14–1)	Nebraska (15–6)	Auburn (20–3)	Ole Miss (25–4)	Nebraska (23–8)	Nebraska (26–8)	Duke (29–12)	Clemson (34–11)	Alabama (31–18)	Nebraska (35–12)	Alabama (36–20)	Alabama (37–21)	Stanford (42–13)	20.
21.	Northwestern	Oregon (5–0)	South Carolina (10–0)	Mississippi State (13–2)	Mississippi State (18–3)	Nebraska (19–6)	Nebraska (20–8)	Duke (21–12)	Ohio State (29–6–1)	Nebraska (28–10)	Oklahoma State (24–14)	Duke (34–14)	Ohio State (41–10–1)	Duke (37–15)	Duke (38–16)	Mississippi State (39–19)	21.
22.	Washington	Northwestern (3–2)	Missouri (6–5)	Alabama (10–6)	Alabama (15–6)	Ole Miss (20–4)	Florida Atlantic (27–4)	Ohio State (25–6–1)	Duke (25–12)	Ohio State (30–9–1)	Alabama (29–16)	Ohio State (37–10–1)	Duke (37–15)	Ohio State (43–11–1)	Ohio State (43–12–1)	Georgia (35–23)	22.
23.	Oregon	Kentucky (4–1)	Alabama (5–6)	San Diego State (12–3)	Kentucky (14–6)	Kentucky (17–6)	Auburn (20–8)	Florida Atlantic (29–5)	Florida Atlantic (32–5)	Alabama (28–15)	Georgia (27–15)	Oklahoma State (27–15)	Oklahoma State (29–17)	Oklahoma State (33–17)	Grand Canyon (46–6)	Duke (41–18)	23.
24.	Mississippi State	Baylor (3–2)	Kentucky (6–4)	Kentucky (10–5)	Florida Atlantic (19–4)	Florida Atlantic (24–4)	Grand Canyon (22–3)	Virginia (24–8)	Alabama (25–13)	Clemson (30–11)	Ohio State (33–10–1)	Georgia (28–17)	Grand Canyon (40–6)	Grand Canyon (43–6)	Oklahoma State (33–18)	Ohio State (45–14–1)	24.
25.	Clemson	Washington (2–3)	San Diego State (8–2)	Florida Atlantic (15–2)	Ole Miss (18–3)	Alabama (19–7)	Ohio State (20–6–1)	Auburn (21–11)	Virginia (25–10)	Florida Atlantic (34–7)	Virginia (30–13)	Virginia (33–14)	Virginia (35–16)	Virginia (36–16)	Virginia (37–17)	Oklahoma State (35–20)	25.
	Preseason Jan 28	Week 1 Feb 11	Week 2 Feb 18	Week 3 Feb 25	Week 4 Mar 4	Week 5 Mar 11	Week 6 Mar 18	Week 7 Mar 25	Week 8 Apr 1	Week 9 Apr 8	Week 10 Apr 15	Week 11 Apr 22	Week 12 Apr 29	Week 13 May 6	Week 14 May 13	Final Jun 10	
		Dropped: No. 25 Clemson	Dropped: No. 22 Northwestern; No. 24 Baylor; No. 25 Washington	Dropped: No. 22 Missouri	Dropped: No. 23 San Diego State	None	Dropped: No. 23 Kentucky; No. 25 Alabama	Dropped: No. 24 Grand Canyon	Dropped: No. 25 Auburn	Dropped: No. 25 Virginia	Dropped: No. 25 Florida Atlantic	None	Dropped: No. 24 Georgia	None	None	Dropped: No. 23 Grand Canyon; No. 25 Virginia	

== ESPN.com/USA Softball Collegiate Top 25 ==
	Preseason Jan 21	Week 1 Feb 11	Week 2 Feb 18	Week 3 Feb 25	Week 4 Mar 4	Week 5 Mar 11	Week 6 Mar 18	Week 7 Mar 25	Week 8 Apr 1	Week 9 Apr 8	Week 10 Apr 15	Week 11 Apr 22	Week 12 Apr 29	Week 13 May 6	Week 14 May 13	Final Jun 10	
1.	Texas (15)	Texas (6–0) (17)	Texas (11–0) (25)	Oklahoma (14–0) (11)	Oklahoma (19–0) (16)	Oklahoma (22–0) (20)	Oklahoma (26–0) (17)	Texas (31–2) (17)	Texas (34–3) (25)	Texas (37–3) (25)	Texas A&M (37–5) (21)	Tennessee (37–9) (16)	Oklahoma (42–5) (21)	Texas A&M (43–9) (12)	Texas A&M (45–9) (21)	Texas (56–12) (25)	1.
2.	Florida (4)	Florida (6–0) (6)	Oklahoma (10–0)	Texas (15–1) (7)	Texas (20–1) (5)	Texas (24–1) (5)	Texas (28–1) (8)	Oklahoma (29–1) (8)	Florida (33–5)	Oklahoma (34–3)	Tennessee (34–9) (4)	Texas A&M (39–6) (8)	Tennessee (39–11) (3)	Oklahoma (43–7) (6)	Oklahoma (45–7) (4)	Texas Tech (54–14)	2.
3.	Oklahoma (6)	Oklahoma (6–0) (2)	Florida (13–1)	Florida (18–1) (6)	Florida (23–1) (4)	Florida (26–2)	LSU (27–1)	LSU (29–2)	Oklahoma (31–3)	Texas A&M (34–5)	Texas (39–5)	Texas (41–6) (1)	Oregon (44–5) (1)	Tennessee (40–13)	Arkansas (40–12)	Oklahoma (52–9)	3.
4.	Oklahoma State	UCLA (5–0)	UCLA (9–1)	UCLA (14–2)	Texas A&M (20–2)	LSU (23–1)	Florida (27–4)	Florida (30–4)	Texas A&M (31–5)	Oregon (35–3)	Oklahoma (36–4)	Oklahoma (39–5)	Texas A&M (41–8)	Florida (43–13) (1)	Texas (46–10)	Tennessee (47–14)	4.
5.	Tennessee	Texas A&M (6–0)	LSU (10–0)	Texas A&M (15–1)	LSU (18–1)	UCLA (23–4)	UCLA (27–4)	Texas A&M (26–5)	Oregon (31–3)	Tennessee (32–8)	UCLA (40–5)	Oregon (41–5)	Texas (42–9)	Texas (45–9) (3)	Florida (43–14)	UCLA (55–13)	5.
6.	UCLA	Tennessee (5–1)	Texas A&M (10–1)	LSU (14–0) (1)	UCLA (18–4)	Texas A&M (21–4)	Texas A&M (24–4)	Oregon (29–3)	Tennessee (29–7)	LSU (34–5)	Oregon (38–4)	Florida (39–10)	Arkansas (36–10)	Arkansas (38–11) (2)	Tennessee (40–14)	Oregon (54–10)	6.
7.	Texas A&M	LSU (5–0)	Tennessee (10–1)	Tennessee (13–3)	Arizona (21–2)	Tennessee (21–4)	Tennessee (25–4)	UCLA (28–5)	LSU (31–4)	UCLA (36–5)	Florida (37–9)	Florida State (40–6)	Florida (41–11)	Oregon (47–6) (1)	Florida State (46–9)	Florida (48–17)	7.
8.	Duke	Texas Tech (5–1)	Florida State (8–1)	Florida State (11–3)	Tennessee (19–3)	Oregon (22–2)	Oregon (26–3)	Florida State (29–5)	UCLA (32–5)	Florida (34–8)	Florida State (40–6)	UCLA (41–7)	UCLA (44–7)	Florida State (44–8)	LSU (41–14)	Ole Miss (42–21)	8.
9.	LSU	Florida State (4–1)	Georgia (9–0)	Duke (13–3)	Florida State (16–3)	South Carolina (20–3)	Florida State (25–5)	Arizona (29–5)	South Carolina (27–7)	Florida State (36–6)	LSU (35–8)	Arkansas (34–9)	Florida State (42–7)	LSU (40–13)	UCLA (49–10)	Florida State (49–12)	9.
10.	Texas Tech	Oklahoma State (2–2)	Arkansas (10–1)	Arizona (15–2)	Arkansas (19–1)т	Florida State (20–5)	Arizona (26–4)т	Tennessee (26–6)	Florida State (33–5)	Arkansas (28–8)	Arkansas (31–9)	LSU (36–10)	LSU (38–11)	UCLA (47–9)	Texas Tech (45–12)	South Carolina (44–17)	10.
11.	Alabama	Georgia (5–0)	Arizona (10–1)	Georgia (14–0)	South Carolina (19–0)т	Arizona (22–4)	South Carolina (22–5)т	South Carolina (24–6)	Virginia Tech (28–5)	South Carolina (30–8)	Virginia Tech (36–5)	South Carolina (34–11)	Texas Tech (39–11)	Texas Tech (42–12)	Oregon (47–7)	Clemson (48–14)	11.
12.	Florida State	Alabama (4–1)	Texas Tech (8–3)	Arkansas (14–1)	Oregon (20–1)	Texas Tech (20–7)	Texas Tech (23–7)	Virginia Tech (25–5)	Arizona (31–6)	Virginia Tech (32–5)	South Carolina (32–10)	Texas Tech (36–10)	South Carolina (36–13)	South Carolina (39–14)	South Carolina (40–15)	Nebraska (43–15)	12.
13.	Arkansas	Arkansas (5–0)	Oklahoma State (5–4)	Texas Tech (14–3)	Oklahoma State (14–4)	Georgia (19–4)	Oklahoma State (17–6)	Texas Tech (24–9)	Arkansas (27–9)	Arizona (33–7)	Arizona (36–7)	Arizona (37–9)	Arizona (40–10)	Arizona (43–10)	Clemson (44–12)	Arkansas (44–14)	13.
14.	Georgia	Duke (3–2)	Duke (7–3)	Oregon (15–1)	Georgia (18–2)	Oklahoma State (16–6)	Virginia Tech (23–5)	Arkansas (23–6)	Texas Tech (27–9)	Texas Tech (31–9)	Texas Tech (34–9)	Virginia Tech (37–7)	Alabama (35–18)	Virginia Tech (40–10)т	Arizona (45–11)	Alabama (40–23)	14.
15.	Missouri	Arizona (5–1)	Nebraska (8–2)	Oklahoma State (7–4)	Texas Tech (18–6)	Arkansas (20–3)	Georgia (21–6)	Oklahoma State (19–7)	Mississippi State (29–8)	Mississippi State (31–10)	Mississippi State (33–11)	Alabama (31–18)	Virginia Tech (39–8)	Clemson (41–12)т	Virginia Tech (41–11)	Texas A&M (48–11)	15.
16.	Nebraska	Missouri (4–1)	Mississippi State (9–1)	Nebraska (12–4)	Duke (14–6)	Virginia Tech (19–5)	Arkansas (20–6)	Stanford (23–3)	Georgia (25–10)	Duke (29–12)	Stanford (29–8)	Stanford (32–9)	Clemson (41–12)	Alabama (36–20)	Alabama (37–21)	Liberty (50–15)	16.
17.	Arizona	Nebraska (3–2)	Virginia Tech (8–2)	Virginia Tech (12–3)	Auburn (19–1)	Duke (17–7)	Stanford (20–3)	Georgia (23–8)	Stanford (24–6)	Stanford (26–8)	Alabama (29–16)т	Mississippi State (33–14)	Stanford (35–10)	Stanford (39–10)	Duke (38–16)	Georgia (35–23)	17.
18.	Virginia Tech	Virginia Tech (5–0)	Auburn (11–0)	Stanford (12–2)	Virginia Tech (17–4)	Nebraska (19–6)	Duke (19–9)	Mississippi State (27–6)	Oklahoma State (21–9)	Oklahoma State (23–11)	Duke (31–13)т	Duke (34–14)	Mississippi State (35–15)	Mississippi State (37–16)	Mississippi State (37–17)	Arizona (48–13)	18.
19.	Baylor	Mississippi State (4–1)	Oregon (10–1)	Auburn (14–1)	Nebraska (15–6)	Mississippi State (22–3)	Mississippi State (24–5)	Duke (21–12)	Duke (25–12)	Ole Miss (29–9)	Clemson (34–11)	Clemson (37–12)	Ole Miss (34–14)	Nebraska (38–12)	Stanford (40–11)	LSU (42–16)	19.
20.	Northwestern	Oregon (5–0)	Stanford (9–0)	Mississippi State (13–2)	Stanford (14–3)	Stanford (17–3)	Ole Miss (25–4)	Nebraska (23–8)	Ole Miss (28–6)	Georgia (25–13)	Ole Miss (31–11)	Ole Miss (33–12)	Duke (37–15)	Duke (37–15)	Nebraska (39–13)	Virginia Tech (43–13)	20.
21.	California	Northwestern (3–2)	Alabama (5–5)	South Carolina (15–0)	Alabama (15–6)	Ole Miss (20–4)	Nebraska (20–8)	Ole Miss (26–6)	Nebraska (26–8)	Clemson (30–11)	Nebraska (31–10)	Nebraska (33–11)	Nebraska (35–12)т	Ole Miss (35–16)	Ole Miss (37–17)	Duke (41–18)	21.
22.	Michigan	Stanford (4–0)	Missouri (6–5)	Alabama (10–6)	Mississippi State (18–3)	Auburn (20–3)	Liberty (23–4)	Virginia (24–8)	Ohio State (29–6–1)	Alabama (28–15)	Oklahoma State (24–14)	Ohio State (37–10–1)	Ohio State (41–10–1)т	Ohio State (43–11–1)	Ohio State (43–12–1)	Stanford (42–13)	22.
23.	Stanfordт	Baylor (3–2)	San Diego State (8–2)	San Diego State (12–3)	Virginia (15–5)	Alabama (19–7)	Virginia (21–7)	Ohio State (25–6–1)	Alabama (25–13)	Nebraska (28–10)	Georgia (27–15)	Oklahoma State (27–15)	Oklahoma State (29–17)	Oklahoma State (33–17)	Oklahoma State (33–18)	Mississippi State (39–19)	23.
24.	Oregonт	Kentucky (4–1)	South Carolina (10–0)	Liberty (12–3)	Liberty (16–4)	Liberty (16–4)	Alabama (21–9)	Liberty (27–6)	Liberty (31–6)	Ohio State (30–9–1)	Ohio State (33–10–1)	Georgia (28–17)	Georgia (29–17)т	Grand Canyon (43–6)	Grand Canyon (46–6)	Ohio State (45–14–1)	24.
25.	Mississippi State	Florida Atlantic (6–0)	Liberty (8–3)	Virginia (9–5)	Ole Miss (18–3)	Virginia (17–7)	Ohio State (21–6–1)	Alabama (22–12)	Clemson (27–10)	Liberty (33–8)	Liberty (36–9)	Grand Canyon (37–6)	Grand Canyon (40–6)т	Virginia (36–16)	Michigan (38–19)	Oklahoma State (35–20)	25.
	Preseason Jan 21	Week 1 Feb 11	Week 2 Feb 18	Week 3 Feb 25	Week 4 Mar 4	Week 5 Mar 11	Week 6 Mar 18	Week 7 Mar 25	Week 8 Apr 1	Week 9 Apr 8	Week 10 Apr 15	Week 11 Apr 22	Week 12 Apr 29	Week 13 May 6	Week 14 May 13	Final Jun 10	
		Dropped: No. 21 California; No. 22 Michigan	Dropped: No. 21 Northwestern; No. 23 Baylor; No. 24 Kentucky; No. 25 Florida Atlantic	Dropped: No. 22 Missouri	Dropped: No. 23 San Diego State	None	Dropped: No. 22 Auburn	None	Dropped: No. 22 Virginia	None	None	Dropped: No. 25 Liberty	None	Dropped: No. 24т Georgia	Dropped: No. 25 Virginia	Dropped: No. 24 Grand Canyon; No. 25 Michigan	

== D1Softball ==
	Preseason Jan 21	Week 1 Feb 11	Week 2 Feb 18	Week 3 Feb 25	Week 4 Mar 4	Week 5 Mar 11	Week 6 Mar 18	Week 7 Mar 24	Week 8 Apr 1	Week 9 Apr 8	Week 10 Apr 15	Week 11 Apr 22	Week 12 Apr 29	Week 13 May 6	Final Jun 10	
1.	Florida	Florida (6–0)	Texas (11–0)	Oklahoma (14–0)	Oklahoma (19–0)	Oklahoma (22–0)	Oklahoma (26–0)	Texas (31–2)	Texas (34–3)	Texas (37–3)	Texas A&M (37–5)	Texas (41–6)	Oklahoma (42–5)	Texas A&M (43–9)	Texas (56–12)	1.
2.	Texas	Texas (6–0)	Oklahoma (10–0)	Texas (15–1)	Texas (20–1)	Texas (24–1)	Texas (28–2)	Oklahoma (29–1)	Florida (33–5)	Oklahoma (34–3)	Texas (39–5)	Texas A&M (39–6)	Tennessee (39–11)	Arkansas (38–11)	Texas Tech (54–14)	2.
3.	Oklahoma	UCLA (5–0)	Florida (13–1)	Florida (18–1)	Florida (23–1)	Florida (26–2)	Florida (28–4)	Florida (30–4)	Oklahoma (31–3)	Texas A&M (34–5)	Florida State (40–6)	Tennessee (37–9)	Arkansas (36–10)	Oklahoma (43–7)	Oklahoma (52–9)	3.
4.	UCLA	Oklahoma (6–0)	Florida State (8–1)	Texas A&M (15–1)	Arizona (21–2)	LSU (23–1)	LSU (27–1)	LSU (29–2)	Florida State (33–5)	Florida State (36–6)	Tennessee (34–9)	Florida State (40–6)	Texas A&M (41–8)	Florida State (44–8)	Tennessee (47–17)	4.
5.	Oklahoma State	Tennessee (5–1)	LSU (10–0)	LSU (14–0)	Texas A&M (20–2)	Tennessee (21–4)	Texas A&M (24–4)	Florida State (29–5)	Texas A&M (31–5)	LSU (34–5)	Oklahoma (36–5)	Oklahoma (39–5)	Florida State (42–7)	Tennessee (40–13)	UCLA (55–13)	5.
6.	Tennessee	Florida State (4–1)	Tennessee (10–1)	UCLA (14–2)	LSU (18–1)	Texas A&M (21–4)	UCLA (27–4)	Texas A&M (26–5)	South Carolina (27–7)	South Carolina (30–8)	UCLA (40–5)	Oregon (40–5)	Texas (42–9)	Texas (45–9)	Oregon (54–10)	6.
7.	Duke	Texas A&M (6–0)	UCLA (9–1)	Arizona (15–2)	Tennessee (19–3)	UCLA (23–4)	Tennessee (25–4)	Arizona (29–5)	LSU (31–4)	UCLA (36–5)	Arkansas (31–9)	Arkansas (34–9)	Oregon (44–5)	Florida (43–13)	Florida (48–17)	7.
8.	Florida State	LSU (5–0)	Texas A&M (10–1)	Duke (13–3)	UCLA (18–4)	Oregon (23–2)	Arizona (26–4)	Oregon (30–3)	UCLA (32–5)	Arkansas (29–8)	Florida (37–9)	Florida (39–10)	UCLA (45–7)	Oregon (47–6)	Ole Miss (42–21)	8.
9.	Texas A&M	Oklahoma State (2–2)	Arkansas (10–0)	Tennessee (13–3)	South Carolina (19–0)	Arizona (22–4)	Oregon (27–3)	UCLA (28–5)	Oregon (31–3)	Florida (34–8)	South Carolina (32–10)	UCLA (41–7)	Texas Tech (39–11)	Texas Tech (42–12)	Clemson (48–14)	9.
10.	Arkansas	Arizona (5–1)	Arizona (10–1)	Florida State (11–3)	Arkansas (19–1)	Oklahoma State (16–6)	South Carolina (22–5)	South Carolina (24–6)	Tennessee (29–7)	Tennessee (32–8)	LSU (35–8)	South Carolina (35–11)	LSU (39–11)	Arizona (43–10)	Nebraska (43–15)	10.
11.	LSU	Texas Tech (5–1)	Oklahoma State (5–4)	Oregon (15–1)	Florida State (16–3)	Texas Tech (20–7)	Texas Tech (23–7)	Tennessee (27–6)	Arizona (31–6)	Arizona (33–7)	Arizona (36–7)	Texas Tech (36–10)	Florida (41–12)	LSU (40–13)	Arkansas (44–14)	11.
12.	Arizona	Georgia (5–0)	Georgia (9–0)	Oklahoma State (8–4)	Oklahoma State (14–4)	Florida State (20–5)	Oklahoma State (17–6)	Virginia Tech (25–5)	Virginia Tech (28–5)	Oregon (35–4)	Virginia Tech (36–5)	LSU (36–10)	Clemson (41–12)	Clemson (41–12)	Florida State (49–12)	12.
13.	Texas Tech	Arkansas (5–0)	Duke (7–3)	Arkansas (14–1)	Oregon (20–1)	Duke (17–7)	Duke (19–9)	Oklahoma State (19–7)	Arkansas (26–7)	Virginia Tech (32–5)	Oregon (38–4)	Arizona (37–9)	Arizona (40–10)	UCLA (47–9)	South Carolina (44–17)	13.
14.	Nebraska	Duke (3–2)	Texas Tech (8–3)	Georgia (14–0)	Duke (14–6)	South Carolina (20–3)	Florida State (25–5)	Arkansas (23–7)	Texas Tech (27–9)	Texas Tech (31–9)	Texas Tech (34–9)	Clemson (37–12)	South Carolina (36–13)	South Carolina (39–14)	Texas A&M (48–11)	14.
15.	Georgia	Missouri (4–1)	Nebraska (8–2)	Texas Tech (15–3)	Virginia Tech (17–4)	Virginia Tech (19–5)	Virginia Tech (23–5)	Stanford (23–3)	Mississippi State (29–8)	Duke (29–12)	Clemson (34–11)	Duke (34–14)	Virginia Tech (39–8)	Virginia Tech (40–10)	Liberty (50–15)	15.
16.	Virginia Tech	Virginia Tech (5–0)	Virginia Tech (8–2)	Nebraska (12–4)	Georgia (18–2)	Georgia (19–4)	Mississippi State (24–5)	Texas Tech (24–9)	Duke (25–12)	Clemson (30–11)	Mississippi State (33–11)	Stanford (32–9)	Duke (37–15)	Stanford (38–10)	Georgia (35–23)	16.
17.	Alabama	Mississippi State (4–1)	Mississippi State (9–1)	Stanford (12–2)	Auburn (19–1)	Mississippi State (21–3)	Stanford (20–3)	Mississippi State (27–6)	Stanford (24–6)	Mississippi State (31–10)	Duke (31–13)	Virginia Tech (37–7)	Stanford (35–10)	Duke (37–15)	Alabama (40–23)	17.
18.	Oregon	Florida Atlantic (6–0)	Auburn (11–0)	Virginia Tech (12–3)	Texas Tech (18–6)	Stanford (17–3)	Ole Miss (25–4)	Duke (21–12)	Oklahoma State (21–9)	Oklahoma State (23–11)	Stanford (29–8)	Alabama (31–18)	Alabama (35–18)	Mississippi State (37–16)	Duke (41–18)	18.
19.	Northwestern	Nebraska (3–2)	San Diego State (8–2)	Mississippi State (13–2)	Stanford (14–3)	Arkansas (20–3)	Georgia (21–6)	Georgia (23–8)	Ole Miss (28–7)	Ole Miss (29–9)	Alabama (30–16)	Mississippi State (33–14)	Mississippi State (35–15)	Nebraska (38–12)	Arizona (48–13)	19.
20.	Michigan	Alabama (4–1)	Stanford (9–0)	San Diego State (12–3)	Nebraska (15–6)	Ole Miss (20–4)	Ohio State (21–6–1)	Liberty (27–6)	Clemson (27–10)	Stanford (26–8)	Ole Miss (31–11)	Ole Miss (33–12)	Nebraska (35–12)	Alabama (36–20)	Stanford (42–13)	20.
21.	Baylor	Oregon (5–0)	Missouri (6–5)	South Carolina (15–0)	Alabama (15–6)	UCF (19–8–1)	Liberty (23–4)	Ohio State (25–6–1)	Florida Atlantic (32–5)	Liberty (33–8)	Nebraska (32–10)	Ohio State (37–10–1)	Ohio State (41–10–1)	Ohio State (43–11–1)	Virginia Tech (43–13)	21.
22.	Stanford	Boston (5–0)	Liberty (8–3)	Florida Atlantic (15–2)	Clemson (14–6)	Nebraska (19–6)	Arkansas (20–6)	Florida Atlantic (29–5)	Liberty (31–6)	Florida Atlantic (34–7)	Liberty (36–9)	Virginia (33–14)	Ole Miss (34–14)	Grand Canyon (43–6)	LSU (42–16)	22.
23.	Boston	Stanford (4–0)	Oregon (10–1)	Auburn (14–1)	Virginia (15–5)	Auburn (20–3)	Arizona State (21–8)	Clemson (24–9)	Ohio State (29–7–1)	Ohio State (30–9–1)	Virginia (30–13)	Nebraska (33–11)	Grand Canyon (40–6)	Virginia (36–16)	Oklahoma State (35–20)	23.
24.	Liberty	Liberty (5–0)	South Carolina (10–0)	Liberty (12–3)	Mississippi State (18–3)	Alabama (19–7)	Florida Atlantic (27–4)	Ole Miss (26–6)	Alabama (25–13)	Alabama (28–15)	Oklahoma State (24–14)	Grand Canyon (37–6)	Virginia (35–16)	Florida Atlantic (43–9)	UCF (35–24–1)	24.
25.	Penn State	Baylor (3–2)	Florida Atlantic (9–2)	Alabama (10–6)	Liberty (16–4)	Liberty (20–4)	California (22–5)	Arizona State (23–10)	Georgia (25–10)	Washington (29–9)	Grand Canyon (33–6)	Florida Atlantic (38–9)	Florida Atlantic (41–9)	Ole Miss (35–16)	Mississippi State (39–19)	25.
	Preseason Jan 21	Week 1 Feb 11	Week 2 Feb 18	Week 3 Feb 25	Week 4 Mar 4	Week 5 Mar 11	Week 6 Mar 18	Week 7 Mar 24	Week 8 Apr 1	Week 9 Apr 8	Week 10 Apr 15	Week 11 Apr 22	Week 12 Apr 29	Week 13 May 6	Final Jun 10	
		Dropped: No. 19 Northwestern; No. 20 Michigan; No. 25 Penn State	Dropped: No. 20 Alabama; No. 22 Boston; No. 25 Baylor	Dropped: No. 21 Missouri	Dropped: No. 20 San Diego State; No. 22 Florida Atlantic	Dropped: No. 22 Clemson; No. 23 Virginia	Dropped: No. 21 UCF; No. 22 Nebraska; No. 23 Auburn; No. 24 Alabama	Dropped: No. 25 California	Dropped: No. 25 Arizona State	Dropped: No. 25 Georgia	Dropped: No. 22 Florida Atlantic; No. 23 Ohio State; No. 25 Washington	Dropped: No. 22 Liberty; No. 24 Oklahoma State	None	None	Dropped: No. 21 Ohio State; No. 22 Grand Canyon; No. 23 Virginia; No. 24 Florida Atlantic	

== Softball America ==
	Preseason Jan 13	Week 1 Feb 10	Week 2 Feb 17	Week 3 Feb 24	Week 4 Mar 3	Week 5 Mar 10	Week 6 Mar 17	Week 7 Mar 24	Week 8 Mar 31	Week 9 Apr 7	Week 10 Apr 14	Week 11 Apr 21	Week 12 Apr 28	Week 13 May 5	Final Jun 9	
1.	Florida	Florida (6–0)	Texas (11–0)	Texas (15–1)	Texas (20–1)	Texas (24–1)	Texas (28–1)	Texas (31–2)	Texas (34–3)	Texas (37–3)	Texas A&M (37–5)	Tennessee (37–9)	Oklahoma (42–5)	Arkansas (38–11)	Texas (56–12)	1.
2.	Texas	Texas (6–0)	Oklahoma (10–0)	Oklahoma (12–0)	Oklahoma (19–0)	Oklahoma (22–0)	Oklahoma (26–0)	Oklahoma (29–1)	Florida (33–5)	Oklahoma (34–3)	Oklahoma (36–4)	Texas A&M (39–6)	Arkansas (36–10)	Texas A&M (43–9)	Texas Tech (54–14)	2.
3.	Oklahoma	Oklahoma (6–0)	Florida (13–1)	Florida (18–1)	Florida (22–1)	Florida (26–2)	LSU (27–1)	LSU (29–2)	Oklahoma (31–3)	Texas A&M (34–5)	Texas (39–5)	Texas (41–6)	Tennessee (39–11)	Florida State (44–8)	Oklahoma (52–9)	3.
4.	Oklahoma State	UCLA (5–0)	UCLA (9–1)	UCLA (14–2)	Arizona (21–2)	LSU (23–1)	Florida (27–4)	Florida (30–4)	Texas A&M (31–5)	LSU (34–5)	Florida State (40–6)	Florida State (40–6)	Oregon (44–5)	Oklahoma (43–7)	Tennessee (47–17)	4.
5.	UCLA	Texas A&M (7–0)	Florida State (8–1)	Texas A&M (15–1)	Texas A&M (20–2)	UCLA (23–4)	UCLA (27–4)	Texas A&M (26–5)	LSU (31–4)	Florida State (36–6)	Arkansas (31–9)	Oklahoma (39–5)	Florida State (42–7)	Tennessee (40–13)	UCLA (55–13)	5.
6.	Tennessee	Tennessee (5–1)	LSU (10–0)	LSU (14–0)	LSU (18–1)	Texas A&M (21–4)	Texas A&M (24–4)	Arizona (29–5)	Florida State (33–5)	South Carolina (30–8)	Tennessee (34–9)	Arkansas (34–9)	Texas A&M (41–8)	Texas (45–9)	Oregon (54–10)	6.
7.	Texas A&M	Florida State (4–1)	Tennessee (10–1)	Arizona (15–2)	UCLA (18–4)	Arizona (22–4)	Arizona (26–4)	Oregon (29–3)	South Carolina (27–7)	Arkansas (28–8)	UCLA (40–5)	Oregon (41–5)	Texas (42–9)	Florida (43–13)	Ole Miss (42–21)	7.
8.	Duke	Texas Tech (5–1)	Texas A&M (10–1)	Duke (13–3)	Florida State (16–3)	Oregon (23–2)	Oregon (26–3)	Florida State (29–5)	Oregon (31–3)	Oregon (35–3)	South Carolina (32–10)	Florida (39–10)	Florida (41–11)	Oregon (47–6)	Florida (48–17)	8.
9.	Texas Tech	Oklahoma State (2–2)	Arizona (10–1)	Florida State (11–3)	South Carolina (19–0)	Tennessee (21–4)	Tennessee (25–4)	UCLA (28–5)	Tennessee (29–7)	UCLA (36–5)	LSU (35–8)	UCLA (41–7)	UCLA (44–7)	Texas Tech (42–12)	Clemson (48–14)	9.
10.	Florida State	LSU (5–0)	Arkansas (10–0)	Arkansas (14–1)	Arkansas (19–1)	South Carolina (20–3)	Florida State (25–5)	South Carolina (24–6)	Arizona (31–6)	Tennessee (32–8)	Oregon (38–4)	South Carolina (34–11)	Texas Tech (39–11)	Clemson (41–12)	Florida State (49–12)	10.
11.	Alabama	Arizona (4–1)	Georgia (9–0)	Tennessee (13–3)	Oregon (20–1)	Florida State (20–5)	South Carolina (22–5)	Virginia Tech (25–5)	UCLA (32–5)	Florida (34–8)	Florida (37–9)	Texas Tech (36–10)	Clemson (41–12)	UCLA (47–9)	Arkansas (44–14)	11.
12.	LSU	Alabama (4–1)	Oklahoma State (5–4)	Georgia (14–0)	Tennessee (19–3)	Texas Tech (20–7)	Texas Tech (23–7)	Arkansas (23–6)	Virginia Tech (28–5)	Arizona (33–7)	Arizona (36–7)	LSU (36–10)	LSU (38–11)	South Carolina (39–14)	Alabama (40–23)	12.
13.	Arkansas	Arkansas (5–0)	Texas Tech (8–3)	Oregon (15–1)	Oklahoma State (14–4)	Duke (17–7)	Oklahoma State (17–6)	Texas Tech (24–9)	Arkansas (26–7)	Virginia Tech (31–9)	Virginia Tech (34–9)	Arizona (37–9)	Alabama (35–18)	LSU (40–13)	Nebraska (43–15)	13.
14.	Arizona	Georgia (5–0)	Nebraska (8–2)	Texas Tech (14–3)	Duke (14–6)	Oklahoma State (16–6)	Ole Miss (25–4)	Tennessee (26–6)	Texas Tech (27–9)	Texas Tech (31–9)	Texas Tech (34–9)	Alabama (31–18)	South Carolina (36–13)	Arizona (43–10)	South Carolina (44–17)	14.
15.	Missouri	Missouri (4–1)	Duke (8–3)	Oklahoma State (7–4)	Georgia (18–2)	Mississippi State (21–3)	Virginia Tech (23–5)	Oklahoma State (19–7)	Ole Miss (28–6)	Duke (29–12)	Clemson (34–11)	Clemson (37–12)	Arizona (40–10)	Alabama (36–20)	Liberty (50–15)	15.
16.	Baylor	Duke (3–2)	Mississippi State (9–1)	Nebraska (12–4)	Texas Tech (18–6)	Ole Miss (20–4)	Mississippi State (24–5)	Stanford (23–3)	Ohio State (29–6–1)	Clemson (30–11)	Mississippi State (33–11)	Stanford (32–9)	Stanford (35–10)	Stanford (38–10)	Georgia (35–23)	16.
17.	Georgia	Nebraska (3–2)	Auburn (11–0)	South Carolina (15–0)	Auburn (19–1)	Georgia (19–4)	Duke (19–9)	Mississippi State (27–6)	Mississippi State (29–8)	Ole Miss (29–9)	Stanford (29–8)	Ohio State (37–10–1)	Ohio State (41–10–1)	Mississippi State (37–16)	Texas A&M (48–11)	17.
18.	Northwestern	Virginia Tech (5–0)	San Diego State (8–2)	San Diego State (12–3)	Nebraska (15–6)	Arkansas (20–3)	Stanford (20–3)	Ohio State (25–6–1)	Stanford (24–6)	Mississippi State (31–10)	Alabama (29–16)	Virginia Tech (37–7)	Virginia Tech (39–8)	Ohio State (43–11–1)	Arizona (48–13)	18.
19.	California	Florida Atlantic (6–0)	Virginia Tech (8–2)	Auburn (14–1)	Alabama (15–6)	Virginia Tech (19–5)	Georgia (21–6)	Ole Miss (26–6)	Duke (25–12)	Stanford (26–8)	Duke (31–13)	Ole Miss (33–12)	Mississippi State (35–15)	Nebraska (38–12)	Stanford (42–13)	19.
20.	Liberty	Liberty (5–0)	Liberty (8–3)	Mississippi State (13–2)	Virginia Tech (17–4)	Nebraska (19–6)	Arkansas (20–6)	Georgia (23–8)	Liberty (31–6)	Ohio State (30–9–1)	Ole Miss (31–11)	Mississippi State (33–14)	Ole Miss (34–14)	Virginia Tech (40–10)	Virginia Tech (43–13)	20.
21.	Nebraska	Mississippi State (4–1)	Oregon (10–1)	Liberty (12–3)	Stanford (14–3)	Stanford (17–3)	Liberty (23–4)	Duke (21–12)	Clemson (27–10)	Liberty (33–8)	Ohio State (33–10–1)	Duke (34–14)	Nebraska (35–12)	Ole Miss (35–16)	LSU (42–16)	21.
22.	Virginia Tech	Oregon (5–0)	South Carolina (10–0)	Alabama (10–6)	Liberty (16–4)	Alabama (19–7)	Ohio State (20–6–1)	Liberty (27–6)	Alabama (25–13)	Oklahoma State (23–11)	Nebraska (31–10)	Nebraska (33–11)	Duke (37–15)	Duke (37–15)	Mississippi State (39–19)	22.
23.	Michigan	Northwestern (3–2)	Alabama (5–5)	Virginia Tech (12–3)	Virginia (15–5)	Auburn (20–3)	Florida Atlantic (21–9)	Florida Atlantic (29–5)	Georgia (25–10)	Alabama (28–15)	Liberty (36–9)	Virginia (33–14)	Grand Canyon (40–6)	Grand Canyon (43–6)	Ohio State (45–14–1)	23.
24.	Virginia	Baylor (3–2)	Missouri (6–5)	Stanford (12–2)	Mississippi State (18–3)	Liberty (20–4)	Alabama (21–9)	Virginia (24–8)	Oklahoma State (21–9)	Florida Atlantic (34–7)	Virginia (30–13)	Grand Canyon (37–6)	Florida Atlantic (41–9)	Florida Atlantic (43–9)	Duke (41–18)	24.
25.	Penn State	South Carolina (5–0)	Florida Atlantic (9–2)	Florida Atlantic (15–2)	Clemson (14–6)	UCF (19–8–1)	California (22–5)	Clemson (24–9)	Florida Atlantic (32–5)	Nebraska (28–10)	Grand Canyon (33–6)	Florida Atlantic (38–9)	Liberty (41–10)	Virginia (36–16)	North Florida (47–15)	25.
	Preseason Jan 13	Week 1 Feb 10	Week 2 Feb 17	Week 3 Feb 24	Week 4 Mar 3	Week 5 Mar 10	Week 6 Mar 17	Week 7 Mar 24	Week 8 Mar 31	Week 9 Apr 7	Week 10 Apr 14	Week 11 Apr 21	Week 12 Apr 28	Week 13 May 5	Final Jun 9	
		Dropped: No. 19 California; No. 23 Michigan; No. 24 Virginia; No. 25 Penn State	Dropped: No. 23 Northwestern; No. 24 Baylor	Dropped: No. 24 Missouri	Dropped: No. 18 San Diego State; No. 25 Florida Atlantic	Dropped: No. 23 Virginia; No. 25 Clemson	Dropped: No. 20 Nebraska; No. 23 Auburn; No. 25 UCF	Dropped: No. 24 Alabama; No. 25 California	Dropped: No. 24 Virginia	Dropped: No. 23 Georgia	Dropped: No. 22 Oklahoma State; No. 24 Florida Atlantic	Dropped: No. 23 Liberty	Dropped: No. 23 Virginia	Dropped: No. 25 Liberty	Dropped: No. 23 Grand Canyon; No. 24 Florida Atlantic; No. 25 Virginia	
