= 2025 UCLA Bruins softball team =

American college softball season

2025 UCLA Bruins softball

Women’s College World Series
- Conference: Big Ten Conference
- CB: No. 5
- Record: 55–13 (17–5 Big Ten)
- Head coach: Kelly Inouye-Perez (18th season)
- Home stadium: Easton Stadium

2025 Big Ten Conference softball standings
	Conf.						Overall
Team	W		L		T	PCT	W		L		T	PCT
No. 6 Oregon ‍†‍‍^{y}	19	–	3	–	0	.864	54	–	10	–	0	.844
No. 19 Nebraska ‍‍‍^{y}	17	–	5	–	0	.773	43	–	15	–	0	.741
No. 9 UCLA ‍‍‍^{y}	17	–	5	–	0	.773	55	–	13	–	0	.809
Northwestern ‍‍‍^{y}	16	–	6	–	0	.727	30	–	20	–	1	.598
No. 22 Ohio State ‍‍‍^{y}	16	–	6	–	0	.727	45	–	14	–	1	.758
Iowa ‍‍‍	15	–	7	–	0	.682	35	–	18	–	0	.660
Washington ‍‍‍^{y}	12	–	9	–	0	.571	35	–	19	–	0	.648
Michigan ‍‍‡‍^{y}	11	–	11	–	0	.500	39	–	21	–	0	.650
Wisconsin ‍‍‍	11	–	11	–	0	.500	33	–	21	–	0	.611
Indiana ‍‍‍^{y}	11	–	12	–	0	.478	34	–	20	–	0	.630
Penn State ‍‍‍	10	–	12	–	0	.455	25	–	27	–	0	.481
Purdue ‍‍‍	9	–	14	–	0	.391	30	–	23	–	0	.566
Illinois ‍‍‍	6	–	15	–	0	.286	22	–	28	–	0	.440
Michigan State ‍‍‍	6	–	16	–	0	.273	16	–	29	–	0	.356
Minnesota ‍‍‍	5	–	17	–	0	.227	20	–	30	–	0	.400
Maryland ‍‍‍	3	–	19	–	0	.136	18	–	31	–	0	.367
Rutgers ‍‍‍	3	–	19	–	0	.136	20	–	36	–	0	.357
† – Conference champion ‡ – Tournament champion y – Invited to the NCAA Tournament; As of June 1, 2025; Rankings from NFCA/USA Today

The 2025 UCLA Bruins softball team represented the University of California, Los Angeles (UCLA) in the 2025 NCAA Division I softball season. The Bruins were coached by Kelly Inouye-Perez, in her eighteenth season. The Bruins played their home games at Easton Stadium and competed in the Big Ten Conference.

== Previous season ==
The Bruins finished the 2024 season 43-12 overall, and 17-4 in the Pac-12 Conference, finishing in second place in their conference. Following the conclusion of the regular season, the Bruins would be a 1st seed in the Pac-12 Tournament they would go on to beat 9th seed Arizona State in the Quarterfinals, 5th seed Arizona in the Semifinals, and the 6th seed Utah in the Finals to win the Conference Title. They would go play in the 2024 NCAA Division I softball tournament where they advanced to the second round of the Women's College World Series, before being eliminated by eventual tournament champion Oklahoma.

== Roster and personnel ==
2025 UCLA Bruins roster
Pitchers: 51 - Jada Cecil - Senior; 23 - Taylor Tinsley - Junior; Catchers: 26 - Jayla Castro - Senior; 00 - Sofia Mujica - Freshman; 28 - Alexis Ramirez - (redshirt) Sophomore; Infielders: 11 - Seneca Curo - Graduate Student; 21 - Aleena Garcia - Freshman; 31 - Ramsey Suarez - Junior; 15 - Jordan Woolery - Junior	Utility: 44 - Kate Blunt - Senior; 33 - Kaniya Bragg - Freshman; 14 - Maggie Daniel - Freshman; 13 - Addison Fisher - Freshman; 43 - Megan Grant - Junior; 32 - Gabriela Jaquez - Junior; 4 - Rylee Pinedo - Junior; 5 - Savnannah Pola - Senior; 22 - Taylor Stephens - Senior; 55 - Kaitlyn Terry - Sophomore; Outfielders: 8 - Jessica Clements - Graduate Student; 30 - Lauren Hatch - Senior; 56 - Liesi Osteen - Sophomore; 29 - Rylee Slimp - Freshman

2025 UCLA Bruins coaching staff
- Kelly Inouye-Perez – Head coach
- Lisa Fernandez – Associate head coach
- Kirk Walker – Assistant coach
- Madilyn Nickles-Camarena - Assistant coach
- Will Oldham – Volunteer assistant coach

== Schedule and results ==
2025 UCLA Bruins softball game log (55-13)
Legend: = Win = Loss = Tie = Canceled/Postponed Bold = UCLA team member,
* = Non-Conference Game
Regular season (47–9)

February (17–3)
Date	Time (PT)	TV	Opponent	Rank	Stadium	Score	Win	Loss	Save	Attendance	Overall record	B1G	Box Score
Stacy Winsberg Memorial Tournament
February 6	6:00 p.m.	BTN+	Cal State Fullerton*	No. 5	Easton Stadium • Los Angeles, California	Postponed (Makeup: April 30)							
February 7	5:00 p.m.	BTN+	IU Indianapolis*	No. 5	Easton Stadium • Los Angeles, California	**W 7-0**^{(6)}	**Tinsley** (1-0)	Phariss (0-1)	—	447	1-0	--	
February 7	7:30 p.m.	BTN+	IU Indianapolis*	No. 5	Easton Stadium • Los Angeles, California	**W 9-0**^{(5)}	**Terry** (1-0)	Holman (0-1)	—	447	2-0	--	
Mark Campbell Invitational
February 8	3:30 p.m.	TBD	Nevada*	No. 5	Bill Barber Park • Irvine, California	**W 8-0**^{(6)}	**Fisher** (1-0)	McPartland (0-1)	**Tinsley** (1)	--	3-0	--	
February 8	6:00 p.m.	TBD	Leigh*	No. 5	Bill Barber Park • Irvine, California	**W 9-0**^{(5)}	**Terry** (1-0)	Finnerty (0-1)	—	--	4-0	--	
Stacy Winsberg Memorial Tournament
February 9	10:30 a.m.	BTN+	UC Riverside*	No. 5	Easton Stadium • Los Angeles, California	**W 10-2**^{(6)}	**Fisher** (2-0)	Heinlin (0-2)	**Cecil** (1)	560	5-0	--	
Shriners Children's Clearwater Invitational
February 14	12:00 p.m.	ESPN2	#9 Oklahoma State*	No. 4	Eddie C. Moore Complex • Clearwater, Florida	**W 6-4**	**Terry** (3-0)	Crandall	—	—	6-0	--	
February 14	4:00 p.m.	ESPN+	Charlotte*	No. 4	Eddie C. Moore Complex • Clearwater, Florida	**W 10-0**^{(5)}	**Fisher** (3-0)	Yarnall (1-2)	—	4,456	7-0	--	
February 15	9:00 a.m.	ESPN+	#23 Kentucky*	No. 4	Eddie C. Moore Complex • Clearwater, Florida	**W 3-1**	**Terry** (4-0)	Fall (1-1)	—	—	8-0	--	
February 15	1:00 p.m.	ESPNU	#14 Alabama*	No. 4	Eddie C. Moore Complex • Clearwater, Florida	**W 6-3**	**Terry** (5-0)	Briski (1-3)	—	—	9-0	--	
February 16	7:00 a.m.	ESPN+	Virginia*	No. 4	Eddie C. Moore Complex • Clearwater, California	**L 6-7**	Henley (3-1)	**Terry** (5-1)	—	—	9-1	--	
Mary Nutter Collegiate Classic
February 20	5:00 p.m.	FloCollege	#22 Missouri*	No. 4	Big League Dreams Sports Park • Cathedral City, California	**W 4-1**	**Terry** (6-1)	McCann (3-1)	—	—	10-1	--	
February 20	7:30 p.m.	FloCollege	#16 Nebraska*	No. 4	Big League Dreams Sports Park • Cathedral City, California	**W 9-1**^{(6)}	**Tinsley** (2-0)	Camenzind (1-1)	—	—	11-1	--	
February 21	3:30 p.m.	FloCollege	#5 Tennessee*	No. 4	Big League Dreams Sports Park • Cathedral City, California	**W 4-3**	**Terry** (7-1)	Mardjetko (5-1)	—	—	12-1	--	
February 22	12:30 p.m.	FloCollege	Baylor*	No. 4	Big League Dreams Sports Park • Cathedral City, California	**W 6-2**	**Fisher** (4-0)	Warncke (3-1)	—	—	13-1	--	
February 22	3:00 p.m.	FloCollege	#10 Arkansas*	No. 4	Big League Dreams Sports Park • Cathedral City, California	**W 9-1**^{(6)}	**Terry** (8-1)	Burnham (4-1)	—	—	14-1	--	
February 23	9:00 a.m.	FloCollege	#11 Duke*	No. 4	Big League Dreams Sports Park • Cathedral City, California	**L 0-1**	Curd (5-1)	**Tinsley** (2-1)	—	—	14-2	--	
Judi Garman Classic
February 27	12:00 p.m.	TBD	#5 LSU*	No. 4	Anderson Family Field • Fullerton, California	**L 1-2**	Berzon (6-0)	**Terry** (8-2)	—		14-3	--	
February 27	2:30 p.m.	TBD	Notre Dame*	No. 4	Anderson Family Field • Fullerton, California	**W 7-2**	**Fisher** (5-0)	Kamzik (2-3)	—		15-3	--	
February 28	2:30 p.m.	TBD	Utah*	No. 4	Anderson Family Field • Fullerton, California	**W 16-4**^{(6)}	**Fisher** (6-0)	Jones (2-7)	—	500	16-3	--	
February 28	5:00 p.m.	ESPN+	at Cal State Fullerton*	No. 4	Anderson Family Field • Fullerton, California	**W 6-2**	**Tinsley** (3-1)	Mccleskey (5-4)	—	409	17-3	--	

March (15–2)
Date	Time (PT)	TV	Opponent	Rank	Stadium	Score	Win	Loss	Save	Attendance	Overall record	B1G	Box Score
March 1	11:30 a.m.	TBD	Weber State*	No. 4	Anderson Family Field • Fullerton, California	**W 26-5**^{(5)}	**Fisher** (7-0)	Veltien (2-4)	—		18-3	--	
March 1	2:00 p.m.	TBD	#12 Arizona*	No. 4	Anderson Family Field • Fullerton, California	**L 8-9**	Netz (8-1)	**Terry** (8-3)	—		18-4	--	
March 6	6:00 p.m.	BTN+	vs LMU*	No. 6	Easton Stadium • Los Angeles, California	**W 11-1**^{(5)}	**Terry** (9-3)	O'dell (4-8)	—	140	19-4	--	
March 7	4:00 p.m.	BTN+	vs Sacramento State*	No. 6	Easton Stadium • Los Angeles, California	**W 12-4**^{(6)}	**Cecil** (1-0)	Ortiz (2-3)	—	352	20-4	--	
March 8	2:30 p.m.	TBD	Sacramento State*	No. 6	SDSU Softball Stadium • San Diego, California	**W 11-1**^{(5)}	**Fisher** (8-0)	Magorian (4-4)	—	1,312	21-4	--	
March 8	5:00 p.m.	MWN	at San Diego State*	No. 6	SDSU Softball Stadium • San Diego, California	**W 5-0**	**Tinsley** (4-1)	Hernandez (4-3)	—	1,312	22-4	--	
March 9	1:00 p.m.	ESPN+	at LMU*	No. 6	Smith Field • Los Angeles, California	**W 12-0**^{(5)}	**Fisher** (9-0)	O'dell (4-9)	—	100	23-4	--	
March 11	7:00 p.m.	BTN+	vs San Diego*	No. 6	Easton Stadium • Los Angeles, California	**W 9-0**^{(5)}	**Terry** (10-3)	Riggs (0-1)	—	368	24-4	--	
March 14	6:00 p.m.	BTN+	vs Purdue	No. 6	Easton Stadium • Los Angeles, California	**W 6-0**	**Tinsley** (5-1)	Elish (6-3)	—	507	25-4	1-0	
March 15	5:00 p.m.	BTN+	vs Purdue	No. 6	Easton Stadium • Los Angeles, California	**W 2-1**	**Terry** (11-3)	Klochack (5-3)	**Tinsley** (2)	637	26-4	2-0	
March 16	12:00 p.m.	BTN+	vs Purdue	No. 6	Easton Stadium • Los Angeles, California	**W 7-5**	**Terry** (12-3)	Klochack (5-3)	—	713	27-4	3-0	
March 22	12:00 p.m.	BTN+	at Iowa	No. 6	Bob Pearl Softball Field • Iowa City, Iowa	**W 8-0**^{(6)}	**Tinsley** (6-1)	Adams (13-3)	—	1,375	28-4	4-0	
March 23	12:30 a.m.	BTN+	at Iowa	No. 6	Bob Pearl Softball Field • Iowa City, Iowa	**L 4-7**	Adams (14-3)	**Tinsley** (6-2)	—	663	28-5	4-1	
March 26	3:30 p.m.	ESPN+	at Howard*	No. 7	Nationals Youth Academy • Washington D.C.	**W 10-0**^{(5)}	**Fisher** (10-0)	Gonzales (0-5)	—	723	29-5	--	
March 28	3:00 p.m.	BTN+	at Maryland	No. 7	Maryland Softball Stadium • College Park, Maryland	**W 9-0**^{(5)}	**Terry** (13-3)	Shearer (3-6)	—	520	30-5	5-1	
March 29	11:00 a.m.	BTN+	at Maryland	No. 7	Maryland Softball Stadium • College Park, Maryland	**W 6-1**	**Tinsley** (7-2)	Godfrey (5-5)	—	1,200	31-5	6-1	
March 30	9:00 a.m.	BTN+	at Maryland	No. 7	Maryland Softball Stadium • College Park, Maryland	**W 10-1**^{(5)}	**Fisher** (11-0)	Bucher (1-3)	—	1,004	32-5	7-1	

April (14–2)
Date	Time (PT)	TV	Opponent	Rank	Stadium	Score	Win	Loss	Save	Attendance	Overall record	B1G	Box Score
April 1	4:30 p.m.	BTN+	vs Cal State Northridge*	No. 9	Easton Stadium • Los Angeles, California	**W 10-2**^{(5)}	**Tinsley** (8-2)	Carranco (8-6)	—	500	33-5	--	
April 1	7:00 p.m.	BTN+	vs UC San Diego*	No. 9	Easton Stadium • Los Angeles, California	**W 9-0**^{(5)}	**Cecil** (2-0)	Adams (2-3)	—	727	34-5	--	
April 4	6:00 p.m.	BTN+	vs #21 Ohio State	No. 9	Easton Stadium • Los Angeles, California	**W 14-6**	**Terry** 14-3	Boutte (13-6)	—	921	35-5	8-1	
April 5	4:00 p.m.	BTN+	vs #21 Ohio State	No. 9	Easton Stadium • Los Angeles, California	**W 7-0**	**Tinsley** (9-2)	Boutte (13-7)	—	1,348	36-5	9-1	
April 8	6:00 p.m.	ESPN+	vs Cal Baptist*	No. 8	Funk Stadium • Riverside, California	**W 10–1**^{(5)}	**Terry** (15–3)	Hollingswort (7–7)	—	390	37–5	--	
April 11	6:00 p.m.	BTN+	vs Washington	No. 8	Easton Stadium • Los Angeles, California	**W 7–4**	**Fisher** (12–0)	Ramuno (7–4)	—	789	38–5	10–1	
April 12	6:00 p.m.	FS1	vs Washington	No. 8	Easton Stadium • Los Angeles, California	**W 7–2**	**Taylor** (10–2)	Reimer (13–5)	—	1,348	39–5	11–1	
April 13	12:00 p.m.	BTN+	vs Washington	No. 8	Easton Stadium • Los Angeles, California	**W 6–5**	**Fisher** (13–0)	Hansen (7–2)	—	1,348	40–5	12–1	
April 18	6:00 p.m.	BTN+	at #5 Oregon	No. 6	Jane Sanders Stadium • Eugene, Oregon	**L 1–3**	Grein (24–1)	**Tinsley** (10–3)	Sokolsky (1)	2,373	40–6	12–2	
April 19	4:00 p.m.	BTN+	at #5 Oregon	No. 6	Jane Sanders Stadium • Eugene, Oregon	**W 8–0**^{(6)}	**Fisher** (14–0)	Sokolsky (11–2)	—	2,517	41–6	13–2	
April 20	2:00 p.m.	BTN+	at #5 Oregon	No. 6	Jane Sanders Stadium • Eugene, Oregon	**L 0–9**^{(5)}	Grein (25–1)	**Terry** (15–4)	—	2,092	41–7	13–3	
April 22	6:00 p.m.	BTN+	vs Long Beach State*	No. 7	Easton Stadium • Los Angeles, California	**W 9–0**^{(5)}	**Cecil** (3–0)	Gonzales (3–4)	—	653	42–7	--	
April 26	11:00 a.m.	BTN+	at Michigan	No. 7	Carol Hutchinson Stadium • Ann Arbor, Michigan	**W 5–3**	**Tinsley** (11–3)	Derkowski (12–12)	**Fisher** (1)	2,432	43–7	14–3	
April 27	10:00 a.m.	BTN+	at Michigan	No. 7	Carol Hutchinson Stadium • Ann Arbor, Michigan	**W 4–3**^{(8)}	**Fisher** (15–0)	Hoehn (16–4)	—	2,443	44–7	15–3	
April 28	10:00 a.m.	BTN+	at Michigan	No. 7	Carol Hutchinson Stadium • Ann Arbor, Michigan	**W 12–8**	**Fisher** (16–0)	Hoehn (16–5)	—	1,171	45–7	16–3	
April 30	6:00 p.m.	BTN+	vs Cal State Fullerton*	No. 6	Easton Stadium • Los Angeles, California	**W 4–2**	**Cecil** (4–0)	Hurtado (5–3)	**Terry** (1)	383	46–7	--	

May (1–2)
Date	Time (PT)	TV	Opponent	Rank	Stadium	Score	Win	Loss	Save	Attendance	Overall record	B1G	Box Score
May 2	6:00 p.m.	BTN+	vs Northwestern	No. 6	Easton Stadium • Los Angeles, California	**L 0–8**^{(6)}	Boyd (13–4)	**Tinsley** (11–4)	—	759	46–8	16–4	
May 3	5:00 p.m.	BTN+	vs Northwestern	No. 6	Easton Stadium • Los Angeles, California	**W 15–8**	**Terry** (16–4)	Blea (1–1)	—	786	47–8	17–4	
May 4	12:00 p.m.	BTN+	vs Northwestern; Senior Day	No. 6	Easton Stadium • Los Angeles, California	**L 3–5**	Boyd (14–4)	**Fisher** (16–1)	—	1,220	47–9	17–5	

Postseason (8–4)

Big Ten Softball Tournament (2–1)
Date	Time (PT)	TV	Opponent	Seed	Stadium	Score	Win	Loss	Save	Attendance	Overall record	Tournament record	Box Score
May 8	10:30 a.m.	BTN	vs (10) Indiana	(2)	Bittinger Stadium • West Lafayette, Indiana	**W 5–4**	**Tinsley** (12–4)	Copeland (16–8)	—	450	48–9	1–0	
May 9	2:00 p.m.	BTN	vs (3) Nebraska	(2)	Bittinger Stadium • West Lafayette, Indiana	**W 4–2**	**Terry** (17–4)	Bahl (23–6)	—	1,417	49–9	2–0	
May 10	1:00 p.m.	BTN	vs (8) Michigan	(2)	Bittinger Stadium • West Lafayette, Indiana	**L 0–2**	Derkowski (17–12)	**Fisher** (16–2)	Hoehn (1)	1,278	49–10	2–1	

Los Angeles Regional (3–0)
Date	Time (PT)	TV	Opponent	Seed	Stadium	Score	Win	Loss	Save	Attendance	Overall record	Regional record
May 16	4:30 p.m.	ESPN+	vs UC Santa Barbara	(9)	Easton Stadium • Los Angeles, California	**W 9–1**^{(6)}	**Tinsley** (13–4)	Johnson (22–11)	**Terry** (1)	1,348	50–10	1–0
May 17	2:00 p.m.	ESPNU	vs San Diego State	(9)	Easton Stadium • Los Angeles, California	**W 10–0**^{(6)}	**Terry** (18–4)	Cellura (19–8)	—	1,348	51–10	2–0
May 18	4:30 p.m.	ESPN+	vs UC Santa Barbara	(9)	Easton Stadium • Los Angeles, California	**W 12–1**^{(5)}	**Tinsley** (14–4)	Johnson (24–12)	—	1,348	52–10	3–0

Columbia Super Regional (2–1)
Date	Time (PT)	TV	Opponent	Seed	Stadium	Score	Win	Loss	Save	Attendance	Overall record	Super Regional record
May 23	10:00 a.m.	ESPN2	vs (8) South Carolina	(9)	Carolina Softball Stadium at Beckham Field • Columbia, South Carolina	**L 2–9**	Gress (14–9)	**Terry** (18–5)	—	1,120	52–11	0–1
May 24	10:00 a.m.	ESPN	vs (8) South Carolina	(9)	Carolina Softball Stadium at Beckham Field • Columbia, South Carolina	**W 5–4**	**Tinsley** (15–4)	Gress (14–10)	—	1,501	53–11	1–1
May 25	12:00 p.m.	ESPN2	vs (8) South Carolina	(9)	Carolina Softball Stadium at Beckham Field • Columbia, South Carolina	**W 5–0**	**Terry** (19–5)	Gress (14–11)	**Tinsley** (1)	1,423	54–11	2–1

Women's College World Series (1–2)
Date	Time (PT)	TV	Opponent	Seed	Stadium	Score	Win	Loss	Save	Attendance	Overall record	WCWS record
May 29	6:30 p.m.	ESPN2	vs (16) Oregon	(9)	Devon Park • Oklahoma City, Oklahoma	**W 4–2**	**Terry** (20–5)	Sokolsky (17–5)	—	12,288	55–11	1–0
May 31	4:00 p.m.	ESPN	vs (12) Texas Tech	(9)	Devon Park • Oklahoma City, Oklahoma	**L 1–3**	Canady (32–5)	**Tinsley** (15–5)	—	12,595	55–12	1–1
June 1	12:00 p.m.	ABC	vs (7) Tennessee	(9)	Devon Park • Oklahoma City, Oklahoma	**L 4–5**	Pickens (25–10)	**Tinsley** (15–6)	—		55–13	1–2

Schedule Notes

== Rankings ==
Ranking movements Legend: ██ Increase in ranking ██ Decrease in ranking
	Week																
Poll	Pre	1	2	3	4	5	6	7	8	9	10	11	12	13	14	15	Final
NFCA / USA Today	5	4	4	4	6	6	6	7	9	8	6	7	6	9	9		
Softball America	5	4	4	4	7	5	5	9	11	9	7	9	9	11	11		
ESPN.com/USA Softball	6	4	4	4	6	5	5	7	8	7	5	8	8	10	9		
D1Softball	4	3	7	6	8	7	6	9	8	7	6	9	8	13	13		

== Awards and honors ==
- May 28, 2025 – Megan Grant was named 2025 National Fastpitch Coaches Association (NFCA) First Team All-American
- May 28, 2025 – Jordan Woolery was named NFCA First Team All-American
- May 28, 2025 – Savannah Pola was named NFCA Third Team All-American
- May 28, 2025 – Taylor Tinsley was named NFCA Third Team All-American
