= 2025 NCAA Division I softball tournament =

College softball tournament

- Teams: 64
- Finals site: Devon Park; Oklahoma City
- Champions: Texas (1st title)
- Runner-up: Texas Tech (1st WCWS Appearance)
- Winning coach: Mike White (1st title)
- MOP: Teagan Kavan (Texas)
- Attendance: 119,778
- Television: ABC; ESPN; ESPN2; ESPNU; ESPN+

The 2025 NCAA Division I softball tournament was held from May 16 through June 6, 2025, as the final part of the 2025 NCAA Division I softball season. The tournament ended with the 2025 Women's College World Series at Devon Park in Oklahoma City Texas defeated Texas Tech during the 2025 Women's College World Series to win their first national championship in program history.

Belmont, Mercer, North Florida, Saint Louis, and Santa Clara made their NCAA Division I softball tournament debuts. The Southeastern Conference (SEC) had an NCAA tournament record 14 teams selected for the tournament.

The No. 1 overall seed, Texas A&M, was defeated by Liberty in the College Station regional. This marked the first time a No. 1 seed in the NCAA tournament failed to advance to the Super Regionals since the NCAA tournament began seeding in 2005.

== Format ==
A total of 64 teams entered the tournament, with 31 of them receiving an automatic bid by either winning their conference's tournament or by finishing in first place in their conference. The remaining 33 bids were at-large, with selections extended by the NCAA Selection Committee.

There are two rounds of the NCAA Division I softball tournament, Regionals and Super Regionals, followed by the Women's College World Series. Each regional round follows a four-team, double-elimination format. Winners of regional rounds compete in best-of-three Super Regional series to determine the eight teams that advance to the Women's College World Series. The World Series also follows a double-elimination format followed by a best-of-three finals series to determine the winner.

== Bids ==
The West Coast Conference bid was awarded to the regular-season champion. All other conferences had their automatic bid go to the conference tournament winner. The SEC championship game was canceled due to inclement weather; Oklahoma received the conference's automatic bid due to being the highest remaining seed in the SEC tournament.

=== Automatic ===
Conference	School	NCAA tournament history	
Conference	School	Best finish	Last appearance
America East	Binghamton	Regionals (2015)	2015
AAC	South Florida	WCWS (2012)	2022
ASUN	North Florida	First appearance	
ACC	Clemson	Super Regionals (2022, 2023)	2024
Atlantic 10	Saint Louis	First appearance	
Big 12	Texas Tech	Regionals (1999, 2001, 2010, 2011, 2012, 2019)	2019
Big East	UConn	WCWS (1993)	2001
Big Sky	Weber State	Regionals (2015, 2016, 2019, 2022) (Note: Weber State appeared in the 1973, 1974, and 1975 Women's College World Series while the tournament was governed by the AIAW, before the NCAA started sponsoring women's athletics in 1982. Weber State's best pre-NCAA finish was a tie for 9th place in all three of its WCWS appearances.)	2022
Big South	USC Upstate	Regionals (2013, 2014, 2015, 2016, 2017, 2024)	2024
Big Ten	Michigan	National champion (2005)	2024
Big West	UC Santa Barbara	Regionals (2004, 2006, 2007)	2007
CAA	Elon	Regionals (2010)	2010
CUSA	Liberty	Regionals (2002, 2011, 2018, 2021, 2022, 2023, 2024)	2024
Horizon	Robert Morris	Regionals (2005)	2005
Ivy League	Brown	Regionals (1997)	1997
MAAC	Marist	Regionals (2006, 2013, 2016, 2023)	2023
MAC	Miami (OH)	Regionals (2005, 2009, 2012, 2016, 2021, 2022, 2023, 2024)	2024
MEAC	Howard	Regionals (2007, 2022)	2022
Missouri Valley	Belmont	First appearance	
Mountain West	San Diego State	Super Regionals (2023)	2024
NEC	Saint Francis	Regionals (2017, 2018, 2019, 2021, 2022, 2024)	2024
Ohio Valley	Eastern Illinois	Regionals (2023) (Note: Eastern Illinois appeared in the 1971 and 1974 Women's College World Series while the tournament was governed by the AIAW, before the NCAA started sponsoring women's athletics in 1982. EIU's best pre-NCAA finish was 5th place in 1974.)	2023
Patriot	Boston University	Regionals (1996, 2002, 2003, 2009, 2010, 2012, 2014, 2016, 2018, 2019, 2021, 2023, 2024)	2024
SEC	Oklahoma	National champion (2000, 2013, 2016, 2017, 2021, 2022, 2023, 2024)	2024
Southern	Mercer	First appearance	
Southland	Southeastern Louisiana	Regionals (2024)	2024
SWAC	Jackson State	Regionals (2011, 2024)	2024
Summit	Omaha	Regionals (2023, 2024) (Note: Omaha appeared in 10 editions of the Women's College World Series while the tournament was governed by the AIAW, before the NCAA started sponsoring women's athletics in 1982. Omaha's best pre-NCAA finish was a championship in 1975.)	2024
Sun Belt	Coastal Carolina	Regionals (1998, 2000, 2001, 2006, 2012)	2012
WAC	Grand Canyon	Regionals (2022, 2023, 2024)	2024
West Coast	Santa Clara	First appearance	

=== At-large ===
School	Conference	NCAA tournament history	
School	Conference	Best finish	Last appearance
Alabama	SEC	National champion (2012)	2024
Arizona	Big 12	National champion (1991, 1993, 1994, 1996, 1997, 2001, 2006, 2007)	2024
Arizona State	Big 12	National champion (2008, 2011)	2022
Arkansas	SEC	Super Regionals (2018, 2021, 2022)	2024
Auburn	SEC	WCWS Runner-up (2016)	2024
California	ACC	National champion (2002)	2024
Duke	ACC	WCWS (2024)	2024
Florida	SEC	National champion (2014, 2015)	2024
Florida Atlantic	AAC	Regionals (1999, 2000, 2001, 2002, 2003, 2004, 2006, 2015, 2016, 2024)	2024
Florida State	ACC	National champion (2018)	2024
Georgia	SEC	WCWS (2009, 2010, 2016, 2018, 2021)	2024
Georgia Tech	ACC	Super Regionals (2009)	2022
Indiana	Big Ten	WCWS (1983, 1986)	2024
Kentucky	SEC	WCWS (2014)	2024
LSU	SEC	WCWS (2001, 2004, 2012, 2015, 2016, 2017)	2024
Mississippi State	SEC	Super Regionals (2022)	2024
Nebraska	Big Ten	WCWS Runner-up (1985 (vacated))	2023
Northwestern	Big Ten	WCWS Runner-up (2006)	2024
North Carolina	ACC	Regionals (2001, 2003, 2004, 2005, 2006, 2007, 2008, 2009, 2010, 2012, 2015, 2016, 2017, 2019)	2019
Ohio State	Big Ten	Super Regionals (2009)	2022
Oklahoma State	Big 12	WCWS (1982, 1989, 1990, 1993, 1994, 1998, 2011, 2019, 2021, 2022, 2023, 2024)	2024
Ole Miss	SEC	Super Regionals (2017, 2019)	2024
Oregon	Big Ten	WCWS (1989, 2012, 2014, 2015, 2017, 2018)	2024
South Carolina	SEC	WCWS (1983, 1989, 1997)	2024
Stanford	ACC	WCWS (2001, 2004, 2023, 2024)	2024
Tennessee	SEC	WCWS Runner-up (2007, 2013)	2024
Texas	SEC	WCWS Runner-up (2022, 2024)	2024
Texas A&M	SEC	National champion (1983, 1987)	2024
UCF	Big 12	Super Regionals (2022)	2024
UCLA	Big Ten	National champion (1982, 1984, 1985, 1988, 1989, 1990, 1992, 1995 (vacated), 1999, 2003, 2004, 2010, 2019)	2024
Virginia	ACC	Regionals (2010, 2024)	2024
Virginia Tech	ACC	WCWS (2008)	2024
Washington	Big Ten	National champion (2009)	2024

=== By conference ===
Conference	Total	Schools
SEC	14	Alabama, Arkansas, Auburn, Florida, Georgia, Kentucky, LSU, Mississippi State, Oklahoma, Ole Miss, South Carolina, Tennessee, Texas, Texas A&M
ACC	9	California, Clemson, Duke, Florida State, Georgia Tech, North Carolina, Stanford, Virginia, Virginia Tech
Big Ten	8	Indiana, Michigan, Nebraska, Northwestern, Ohio State, Oregon, UCLA, Washington
Big 12	5	Arizona, Arizona State, Oklahoma State, Texas Tech, UCF
American	2	Florida Atlantic, South Florida
ASUN	1	North Florida
America East	1	Binghamton
Atlantic 10	1	Saint Louis
Big East	1	UConn
Big Sky	1	Weber State
Big South	1	USC Upstate
Big West	1	UC Santa Barbara
CAA	1	Elon
CUSA	1	Liberty
Horizon	1	Robert Morris
Ivy League	1	Brown
MAAC	1	Marist
MAC	1	Miami (OH)
MEAC	1	Howard
Missouri Valley	1	Belmont
Mountain West	1	San Diego State
Northeast	1	Saint Francis
Ohio Valley	1	Eastern Illinois
Patriot	1	Boston University
SoCon	1	Mercer
Southland	1	Southeastern Louisiana
SWAC	1	Jackson State
Summit	1	Omaha
Sun Belt	1	Coastal Carolina
WAC	1	Grand Canyon
West Coast	1	Santa Clara

== National seeds ==
Sixteen national seeds were announced on the Selection Show, on Sunday, May 11 at 7 p.m. EDT on ESPN2 and ESPN+. Teams in italics advanced to Super Regionals. Teams in bold advanced to the Women's College World Series.

1. Texas A&M
2. **Oklahoma**
3. **Florida**
4. Arkansas
5. Florida State
6. **Texas**
7. **Tennessee**
8. South Carolina

9. **UCLA**
10. LSU
11. Clemson
12. **Texas Tech**
13. Arizona
14. Duke
15. Alabama
16. **Oregon**

== Regionals and Super Regionals ==
The Regionals took place May 16–18. The Super Regionals took take place May 22–25.

=== Eugene Super Regional ===
Round 1	Round 2
**1**	**Texas A&M**	**18^{(5)}**
Saint Francis	0
1	Texas A&M	5
**Liberty**	**8**
**Liberty**	**10**
Marist	5
College Station Regional – Davis Diamond
Saint Francis	0
**Marist**	**8^{(6)}**
**1**	**Texas A&M**	**17^{(5)}**
Marist	4
**16**	**Oregon**	**8^{(5)}**
Weber State	0
16	Oregon	1
**Stanford**	**14^{(6)}**
**Stanford**	**9**
Binghamton	2
Eugene Regional – Jane Sanders Stadium
**Weber State**	**7**
Binghamton	4
**16**	**Oregon**	**9**
Weber State	1

Regional Finals
**Liberty**	11	**6**
1	Texas A&M	**14^{(8)}**	5
Stanford	5	7
**16**	**Oregon**	**15^{(6)}**	**10**

Super Regionals
Liberty	2	1	—
**16**	**Oregon**	**3^{(8)}**	**13**	—

=== Columbia Super Regional ===
Round 1	Round 2
**8**	**South Carolina**	**5**
Elon	2
**8**	**South Carolina**	**3**
North Florida	0
Virginia	1
**North Florida**	**2**
Columbia Regional – Carolina Softball Stadium at Beckham Field
Elon	0
**Virginia**	**12**
**North Florida**	**6**
Virginia	5
**9**	**UCLA**	**9^{(6)}**
UC Santa Barbara	1
**9**	**UCLA**	**10^{(6)}**
San Diego State	0
Arizona State	2
**San Diego State**	**3**
Los Angeles Regional – Easton Stadium
**UC Santa Barbara**	**4^{(10)}**
Arizona State	3
San Diego State	5
**UC Santa Barbara**	**7^{(8)}**

Regional Finals
**8**	**South Carolina**	**8^{(5)}**	—
North Florida	0	—
**9**	**UCLA**	**12^{(5)}**	—
UC Santa Barbara	1	—

Super Regionals
8	South Carolina	**9**	4	0
**9**	**UCLA**	2	**5**	**5**

=== Tallahassee Super Regional ===
Round 1	Round 2
**5**	**Florida State**	**10^{(5)}**
Robert Morris	1
**5**	**Florida State**	**8^{(6)}**
South Florida	0
Auburn	7
**South Florida**	**12^{(9)}**
Tallahassee Regional – JoAnne Graf Field
Robert Morris	3
**Auburn**	**11^{(5)}**
South Florida	5
**Auburn**	**7^{(8)}**
**12**	**Texas Tech**	**6**
Brown	0
**12**	**Texas Tech**	**10^{(6)}**
Mississippi State	1
**Mississippi State**	**6**
Washington	3
Lubbock Regional – Rocky Johnson Field
Brown	5
**Washington**	**13^{(6)}**
**Mississippi State**	**11**
Washington	10

Regional Finals
**5**	**Florida State**	3	**4**
Auburn	**8**	0
**12**	**Texas Tech**	**9**	—
Mississippi State	6	—

Super Regionals
5	Florida State	0	1	—
**12**	**Texas Tech**	**3**	**2**	—

=== Fayetteville Super Regional ===
Round 1	Round 2
**4**	**Arkansas**	**10^{(5)}**
Saint Louis	0
**4**	**Arkansas**	**6^{(8)}**
Oklahoma State	5
**Oklahoma State**	**11**
Indiana	6
Fayetteville Regional – Bogle Park
Saint Louis	2
**Indiana**	**4**
**Oklahoma State**	**16^{(6)}**
Indiana	8
**13**	**Arizona**	**13^{(5)}**
Santa Clara	5
13	Arizona	8
**Ole Miss**	**10**
**Ole Miss**	**7**
Grand Canyon	4
Tucson Regional – Mike Candrea Field at Rita Hillenbrand Memorial Stadium
Santa Clara	4
**Grand Canyon**	**9**
**13**	**Arizona**	**4**
Grand Canyon	1

Regional Finals
**4**	**Arkansas**	**12^{(6)}**	—
Oklahoma State	0	—
**Ole Miss**	1	**7**
13	Arizona	**10^{(5)}**	3

Super Regionals
4	Arkansas	7	**4**	4
**Ole Miss**	**9**	0	**7**

=== Gainesville Super Regional ===
Round 1	Round 2
**3**	**Florida**	**8^{(5)}**
Mercer	0
**3**	**Florida**	**14^{(5)}**
Florida Atlantic	6
**Florida Atlantic**	**5^{(8)}**
Georgia Tech	4
Gainesville Regional – Katie Seashole Pressly Softball Stadium
**Mercer**	**7**
Georgia Tech	3
Florida Atlantic	0
**Mercer**	**7**
**14**	**Duke**	**12^{(5)}**
Howard	0
14	Duke	2
**Georgia**	**8**
**Georgia**	**6**
Coastal Carolina	3
Durham Regional – Duke Softball Stadium
Howard	1
**Coastal Carolina**	**9^{(5)}**
**14**	**Duke**	**16^{(8)}**
Coastal Carolina	8

Regional Finals
**3**	**Florida**	**8^{(5)}**	—
Mercer	0	—
**Georgia**	1	**5^{(8)}**
14	Duke	**8**	2

Super Regionals
**3**	**Florida**	**6**	1	**5**
Georgia	1	**2**	2

=== Austin Super Regional ===
Round 1	Round 2
**6**	**Texas**	**10^{(5)}**
Eastern Illinois	2
**6**	**Texas**	**16^{(5)}**
Michigan	4
UCF	3
**Michigan**	**4**
Austin Regional – Red and Charline McCombs Field
Eastern Illinois	2
**UCF**	**10^{(5)}**
Michigan	8
**UCF**	**10**
**11**	**Clemson**	**10^{(5)}**
USC Upstate	2
**11**	**Clemson**	**1^{(9)}**
Northwestern	0
Kentucky	0
**Northwestern**	**4**
Clemson Regional – McWhorter Stadium
USC Upstate	0
**Kentucky**	**11^{(6)}**
Northwestern	3
**Kentucky**	**8**

Regional Finals
**6**	**Texas**	**9**	—
UCF	0	—
**11**	**Clemson**	**5**	—
Kentucky	1	—

Super Regionals
**6**	**Texas**	4	**7^{(10)}**	**6**
11	Clemson	**7**	5	5

=== Knoxville Super Regional ===
Round 1	Round 2
**7**	**Tennessee**	**17^{(5)}**
Miami (OH)	0
**7**	**Tennessee**	**4**
Ohio State	2
**Ohio State**	**9**
North Carolina	6
Knoxville Regional – Sherri Parker Lee Stadium
**Miami (OH)**	**4**
North Carolina	3
**Ohio State**	**11^{(5)}**
Miami (OH)	1
10	LSU	3
**Southeastern Louisiana**	**4**
Southeastern Louisiana	1
**Nebraska**	**14^{(5)}**
**Nebraska**	**10^{(6)}**
UConn	2
Baton Rouge Regional – Tiger Park
**10**	**LSU**	**3**
UConn	0
**Southeastern Louisiana**	**8**
10	LSU	7

Regional Finals
**7**	**Tennessee**	**5**	—
Ohio State	0	—
**Nebraska**	**8^{(6)}**	—
Southeastern Louisiana	0	—

Super Regionals
**7**	**Tennessee**	2	**3**	**1**
Nebraska	**5**	2	0

=== Norman Super Regional ===
Round 1	Round 2
**2**	**Oklahoma**	**8^{(5)}**
Boston University	0
**2**	**Oklahoma**	**11^{(5)}**
California	2
**California**	**1**
Omaha	0
Norman Regional – Love's Field
Boston University	1
**Omaha**	**3**
**California**	**4**
Omaha	0
**15**	**Alabama**	**8^{(5)}**
Jackson State	0
**15**	**Alabama**	**4**
Virginia Tech	3
**Virginia Tech**	**5**
Belmont	0
Tuscaloosa Regional – Rhoads Stadium
Jackson State	1
**Belmont**	**2**
**Virginia Tech**	**11^{(6)}**
Belmont	1

Regional Finals
**2**	**Oklahoma**	**12^{(5)}**	—
California	1	—
**15**	**Alabama**	**3**	—
Virginia Tech	2	—

Super Regionals
**2**	**Oklahoma**	**3**	**13^{(5)}**	—
15	Alabama	0	2	—

== Women's College World Series ==
The Women's College World Series was held May 29 through June 6 in Oklahoma City.

=== Participants ===
School	Conference	Record (conference)	Head coach	WCWS appearances† (including 2025 WCWS)	WCWS best finish†*	WCWS W–L record† (excluding 2025 WCWS)
Florida	SEC	48–15 (14–10)	Tim Walton	13 (last: 2024)	1st (2014, 2015)	30–22
Ole Miss	SEC	41–19 (11–13)	Jamie Trachsel	1 (last: First appearance)	First appearance	0–0
Oklahoma	SEC	50–7 (17–7)	Patty Gasso	18 (last: 2024)	1st (2000, 2013, 2016, 2017, 2021, 2022, 2023, 2024)	53–24
Oregon	Big Ten	53–8 (19–3)	Melyssa Lombardi	7 (last: 2018)	3rd (2014, 2017)	7–12
Tennessee	SEC	45–14 (15–9)	Karen Weekly	9 (last: 2023)	2nd (2007, 2013)	17–16
Texas	SEC	51–11 (16–8)	Mike White	8 (last: 2024)	2nd (2022, 2024)	14–15
Texas Tech	Big 12	50–12 (20–4)	Gerry Glasco	1 (last: First appearance)	First appearance	0–0
UCLA	Big Ten	54–11 (17–5)	Kelly Inouye-Perez	33 (last: 2024)	1st (1982, 1984, 1985, 1988, 1989, 1990, 1992, 1999, 2003, 2004, 2010, 2019)	108–42

=== Bracket ===
First round
**2**	**Oklahoma**	**4**
7	Tennessee	3
3	Florida	0
**6**	**Texas**	**3**
**7**	**Tennessee**	**11^{(5)}**
3	Florida	3
**9**	**UCLA**	**4**
16	Oregon	2
**12**	**Texas Tech**	**1**
Ole Miss	0
**16**	**Oregon**	**6^{(10)}**
Ole Miss	5

Second round
2	Oklahoma	2
**6**	**Texas**	**4**
9	UCLA	4
**7**	**Tennessee**	**5^{(9)}**
9	UCLA	1
**12**	**Texas Tech**	**3**
**2**	**Oklahoma**	**4**
16	Oregon	1

Semifinals
**6**	**Texas**	**2**	—
7	Tennessee	0	—
**12**	**Texas Tech**	**3**	—
2	Oklahoma	2	—

Finals
**6**	**Texas**	**2**	3	**10**
12	Texas Tech	1	**4**	4

=== Game results ===
Date	Game	Winning team	Score	Losing team	Winning pitcher	Losing pitcher	Save	Notes
May 29	Game 1	Texas	3–0	Florida	Teagan Kavan (25–5)	Keagan Rothrock (16–7)	–	Boxscore
May 29	Game 2	Oklahoma	4–3	Tennessee	Sam Landry (24–4)	Karlyn Pickens (24–10)	–	Boxscore
May 29	Game 3	Texas Tech	1–0	Ole Miss	NiJaree Canady (31–5)	Aliyah Binford (11–4)	–	Boxscore
May 29	Game 4	UCLA	4–2	Oregon	Kaitlyn Terry (20–5)	Elise Sokolsky (17–5)	–	Boxscore
May 30	Game 5	Tennessee	11–3 ^{(5)}	Florida	Erin Nuwer (6–4)	Kara Hammock (9–2)	–	Florida eliminated Boxscore
May 30	Game 6	Oregon	6–5 ^{(10)}	Ole Miss	Lyndsey Grein (30–2)	Aliyah Binford (11–5)	–	Ole Miss eliminated Boxscore
May 31	Game 7	Texas	4–2	Oklahoma	Teagan Kavan (26–5)	Sam Landry (24–5)	–	Boxscore
May 31	Game 8	Texas Tech	3–1	UCLA	NiJaree Canady (32–5)	Taylor Tinsley (15–5)	–	Boxscore
June 1	Game 9	Tennessee	5–4 ^{(9)}	UCLA	Karlyn Pickens (25–10)	Taylor Tinsley (15–6)	–	UCLA eliminated Boxscore
June 1	Game 10	Oklahoma	4–1	Oregon	Sam Landry (25–5)	Lyndsey Grein (30–3)	–	Oregon eliminated Boxscore
June 2	Game 11	Texas	2–0	Tennessee	Mac Morgan (11–4)	Karlyn Pickens (25–11)	Teagan Kavan (4)	Tennessee eliminated Boxscore
June 2	Game 13	Texas Tech	3–2	Oklahoma	NiJaree Canady (33–5)	Sam Landry (25–6)	–	Oklahoma eliminated Boxscore
Finals
June 4	Game 1	Texas	2–1	Texas Tech	Teagan Kavan (27–5)	NiJaree Canady (33–6)	–	Texas 1–0
June 5	Game 2	Texas Tech	4–3	Texas	NiJaree Canady (34–6)	Cambria Salmon (7–2)	–	Tied 1–1
June 6	Game 3	Texas	10–4	Texas Tech	Teagan Kavan (28–5)	NiJaree Canady (34–7)	–	Texas wins WCWS

=== Finals ===
==== Game 1 ====
June 4, 2025 – 7:00 p.m. (CDT) at Devon Park in Oklahoma City, Oklahoma
Team	1	2	3	4	5	6	7	R	H	E
Texas Tech	0	0	0	0	1	0	0	**1**	**3**	**0**
**Texas**	0	0	0	0	0	2	x	**2**	**4**	**4**
WP: Teagan Kavan (27–5) LP: NiJaree Canady (33–6); Attendance: 12,109; Boxscore

==== Game 2 ====
June 5, 2025 – 7:00 p.m. (CDT) at Devon Park in Oklahoma City, Oklahoma
Team	1	2	3	4	5	6	7	R	H	E
Texas	0	0	0	0	0	1	2	**3**	**6**	**2**
**Texas Tech**	0	0	0	0	2	2	x	**4**	**5**	**1**
WP: NiJaree Canady (34–6) LP: Cambria Salmon (7–2); Home runs: TEX: Mia Scott; TTU: None; Attendance: 12,220; Boxscore

==== Game 3 ====
June 6, 2025 – 7:00 p.m. (CDT) at Devon Park in Oklahoma City, Oklahoma
Team	1	2	3	4	5	6	7	R	H	E
Texas Tech	0	0	0	0	3	0	1	**4**	**8**	**2**
**Texas**	5	0	1	4	0	0	x	**10**	**12**	**3**
WP: Teagan Kavan (28–5) LP: NiJaree Canady (34–7); Home runs: TTU: None; TEX: Leighann Goode, Mia Scott; Attendance: 12,269; Boxscore

=== All-tournament Team ===
The following players were members of the Women's College World Series All-Tournament Team.

Position	Player	School
P	Aliyah Binford	Ole Miss
P	NiJaree Canady	Texas Tech
P	**Teagan Kavan (MOP)**	Texas
P	Sam Landry	Oklahoma
P	Karlyn Pickens	Tennessee
INF	Reese Atwood	Texas
INF	Joley Mitchell	Texas
INF	Taylor Pannell	Tennessee
INF	Mia Scott	Texas
OF	Mihyia Davis	Texas Tech
OF	Katie Stewart	Texas
DP	Ella Parker	Oklahoma

== Record by conference ==
Conference	# of Bids	Record	Win %	RF	SR	WS	NS	F	NC
SEC	14	61–33	.649	13	9	5	3	1	1
Big 12	5	16–10	.615	4	1	1	1	1	–
Big Ten	8	23–18	.561	4	3	2	–	–	–
ACC	9	16–19	.457	6	2	–	–	–	–
CUSA	1	3–3	.500	1	1	–	–	–	–
ASUN	1	2–2	.500	1	–	–	–	–	–
Big West	1	2–2	.500	1	–	–	–	–	–
SoCon	1	2–2	.500	1	–	–	–	–	–
Southland	1	2–2	.500	1	–	–	–	–	–
American	2	2–4	.333	–	–	–	–	–	–
Big Sky	1	1–2	.333	–	–	–	–	–	–
MAAC	1	1–2	.333	–	–	–	–	–	–
MAC	1	1–2	.333	–	–	–	–	–	–
Missouri Valley	1	1–2	.333	–	–	–	–	–	–
Mountain West	1	1–2	.333	–	–	–	–	–	–
Summit	1	1–2	.333	–	–	–	–	–	–
Sun Belt	1	1–2	.333	–	–	–	–	–	–
WAC	1	1–2	.333	–	–	–	–	–	–
America East	1	0–2	.000	–	–	–	–	–	–
Atlantic 10	1	0–2	.000	–	–	–	–	–	–
Big East	1	0–2	.000	–	–	–	–	–	–
Big South	1	0–2	.000	–	–	–	–	–	–
CAA	1	0–2	.000	–	–	–	–	–	–
Horizon	1	0–2	.000	–	–	–	–	–	–
Ivy League	1	0–2	.000	–	–	–	–	–	–
MEAC	1	0–2	.000	–	–	–	–	–	–
NEC	1	0–2	.000	–	–	–	–	–	–
Patriot	1	0–2	.000	–	–	–	–	–	–
Ohio Valley	1	0–2	.000	–	–	–	–	–	–
SWAC	1	0–2	.000	–	–	–	–	–	–
West Coast	1	0–2	.000	–	–	–	–	–	–

== Media coverage ==
=== Radio ===
For the fifth consecutive year, Westwood One will provide nationwide radio coverage of every game in the tournament. Ryan Radtke and Leah Amico will return as two of the broadcasters.

=== Television ===
ESPN held exclusive rights to the tournament. The network aired games across ABC, ESPN, ESPN2, ESPNU, ESPN+, SEC Network and ACC Network. For the eighth time in the history of the women's softball tournament, ESPN covered every regional.

==== Broadcast assignments ====
Regionals

- College Station: Kevin Fitzgerald & Nicole Mendes
- Norman: Clay Matvick & Natasha Watley
- Gainesville: Krista Blunk & Aleshia Ocasio
- Fayetteville: Mike Couzens & Leah Amico
- Tallahassee: Mark Neely & Carol Bruggeman
- Austin: Eric Frede & Madison Shipman
- Knoxville: Tiffany Greene & Erin Miller
- Columbia: Alex Loeb & Cat Osterman

Super Regionals

- Eugene: Mark Neely & Carol Bruggeman
- Columbia: Courtney Lyle & Danielle Lawrie
- Tallahassee: Kevin Brown & Amanda Scarborough
- Fayetteville: Matt Schumacker & Kenzie Fowler

Women's College World Series

- Beth Mowins, Jessica Mendoza, Michele Smith & Holly Rowe (day games)
- Kevin Brown, Amanda Scarborough & Taylor McGregor (afternoons & night games)

Regionals

- Los Angeles: Courtney Lyle & Danielle Lawrie
- Baton Rouge: Matt Schumacker & Amanda Scarborough
- Clemson: Alex Perlman & Brittany McKinney
- Lubbock: Beth Mowins, Jessica Mendoza & Michele Smith
- Tucson: Chuckie Kempf & Kenzie Fowler
- Durham: Noah Reed & Raine Wilson
- Tuscaloosa: Pam Ward & Jenny Dalton-Hill
- Eugene: Roy Philpott & Jennie Ritter

Super Regionals

- Gainesville: Tiffany Greene & Erin Miller
- Austin: Pam Ward & Jenny Dalton-Hill
- Knoxville: Beth Mowins, Jessica Mendoza, Michele Smith & Holly Rowe
- Norman: Eric Frede & Madison Shipman

Women's College World Series Finals

- Beth Mowins, Jessica Mendoza, Michele Smith & Holly Rowe
