= 2025 Oklahoma Sooners softball team =

College softball season

2025 Oklahoma Sooners softball

SEC regular-season champions SEC tournament co-champions NCAA Norman Regional champion NCAA Norman Super Regional champion
- Conference: Southeastern Conference
- Record: 52–9 (17–7 SEC)
- Head coach: Patty Gasso (31st season)
- Assistant coaches: Jennifer Rocha; JT Gasso
- Home stadium: Love's Field

2025 Southeastern Conference softball standings
	Conf.						Overall
Team	W		L		T	PCT	W		L		T	PCT
No. 3 Oklahoma ‍†‍‡‍^{y}	17	–	7	–	0	.708	52	–	9	–	0	.852
No. 14 Texas A&M ‍‍‡‍^{y}	16	–	7	–	0	.696	48	–	11	–	0	.814
No. 1 Texas ‍‍‍^{y}	16	–	8	–	0	.667	56	–	12	–	0	.824
No. 4 Tennessee ‍‍‍^{y}	15	–	9	–	0	.625	47	–	17	–	1	.731
No. 9 Arkansas ‍‍‍^{y}	14	–	10	–	0	.583	44	–	14	–	0	.759
No. 7 Florida ‍‍‍^{y}	14	–	10	–	0	.583	48	–	17	–	0	.738
No. 12 South Carolina ‍‍‍^{y}	13	–	11	–	0	.542	44	–	16	–	0	.733
No. 21 Mississippi State ‍‍‍^{y}	13	–	11	–	0	.542	39	–	19	–	0	.672
No. 19 LSU ‍‍‍^{y}	12	–	12	–	0	.500	42	–	16	–	0	.724
No. 15 Alabama ‍‍‍^{y}	12	–	12	–	0	.500	40	–	23	–	0	.635
No. 8 Ole Miss ‍‍‍^{y}	11	–	13	–	0	.458	42	–	21	–	0	.667
No. 22 Georgia ‍‍‍^{y}	7	–	16	–	0	.304	35	–	23	–	0	.603
Kentucky ‍‍‍^{y}	7	–	17	–	0	.292	31	–	28	–	0	.525
Auburn ‍‍‍^{y}	6	–	18	–	0	.250	34	–	23	–	0	.596
Missouri ‍‍‍	6	–	18	–	0	.250	25	–	31	–	0	.446
† – Conference champion ‡ – Tournament champion y – Invited to the NCAA tournament As of June 6, 2025; Rankings from NFCA/GoRout

The 2025 Oklahoma Sooners softball team was an American college softball team that represented the University of Oklahoma during the 2025 NCAA Division I softball season. The team was coached by Patty Gasso in her thirty-first season, and played their home games at Love's Field. This season was the team's first as a member of the Southeastern Conference.

== Previous season ==
The Sooners finished the 2024 season 59–7 overall, and 22–5 in the Big 12, finishing in second place in their conference. Following the conclusion of the regular season, the Sooners won the 2024 Big 12 Conference softball tournament and received an automatic bid to the 2024 NCAA Division I softball tournament, where they were the No. 1 overall seed. They won the 2024 Women's College World Series over Texas, becoming the first team in college softball history to four-peat.

== Offseason ==
=== Departures ===
Oklahoma outgoing transfers
Player	Position	Year	New team	Ref
SJ Geurin	Pitcher	Redshirt sophomore	Auburn	
Avery Hodge	Infielder	Junior	LSU	
Quincee Lilio	Utility	Redshirt junior	South Carolina	

=== Additions ===
Oklahoma incoming transfers
Player	Position	Year	Previous team	Ref
Ailana Agbayani	Infielder/Pitcher	Junior	BYU	
Abby Dayton	Outfielder	Junior	Utah	
Isabela Emerling	Catcher	Redshirt junior	North Carolina	
Sam Landry	Pitcher	Senior	Louisiana	
Isabella Smith	Pitcher	Redshirt senior	Campbell	

== Roster and personnel ==
2025 Oklahoma Sooners roster
Pitchers: 8 – Isabella Smith – Redshirt Senior; 11 – Kierston Deal – Junior; 17 – Paytn Monticelli – Junior; 21 – Sam Landry – Senior; 24 – Audrey Lowry – Freshman; 25 – Sophia Bordi – Freshman; 77 – Sydney Barker – Freshman; Catchers: 13 – Isabela Emerling – Redshirt Junior; 99 – Corri Hicks – Freshman; Outfielders: 3 – Chaney Helton – Freshman; 7 – Kasidi Pickering – Sophomore; 12 – Maya Bland – Sophomore; 16 – Abigale Dayton – Junior; 27 – Hannah Coor – Redshirt Junior	Infielders: 1 – Cydney Sanders – Senior; 2 – Nelly McEnroe-Marinas – Redshirt Freshman; 14 – Riley Zache – Freshman; 22 – Kadey Lee McKay – Freshman; 42 – Gabbie Garcia – Freshman; 82 – Avery Hodge – Sophomore; Utility: 5 – Ella Parker – Sophomore; 9 – Tia Milloy – Freshman; 50 – Ailana Agbayani – Junior

2025 Oklahoma Sooners coaching staff
- Patty Gasso – Head coach
- Jennifer Rocha – Associate head coach
- JT Gasso – Associate head coach
- Falepolima Steele – Assistant coach
- Ryan Wondrasek – Director of player development

== Schedule ==
2025 Oklahoma Sooners softball game log
Regular season (43–7)

February (16–0)
Date	Opponent	Rank	Site	Score	Win	Loss	Save	Attendance	Overall Record	SEC Record
February 6	vs. CSUN	No. 2	SDSU Softball Stadium; San Diego, CA	7–2	**Smith** (1–0)	Alonso (0–1)	—	1,000	1–0	–
February 6	at San Diego State	No. 2	SDSU Softball Stadium	11–6 ^{(9)}	**Lowry** (1–0)	Hernandez (0–1)	—	1,184	2–0	–
February 7	vs. California Baptist	No. 2	Anderson Family Field; Fullerton, CA	8–0 ^{(5)}	**Smith** (2–0)	McConnell (0–1)	—	275	3–0	–
February 7	at Cal State Fullerton	No. 2	Anderson Family Field	13–3	**Lowry** (2–0)	McClesky (0–1)	**Landry** (1)	1,086	4–0	–
February 8	vs. Loyola	No. 2	Smith Field; Los Angeles, CA	9–0	**Landry** (1–0)	O'Dell (0–1)	—	—	5–0	–
February 9	at Long Beach State	No. 2	LBSU Softball Complex; Long Beach, CA	2–0 ^{(11)}	**Smith** (3–0)	Martin (0–1)	—	790	6–0	–
February 15	vs. Hofstra; Getterman Classic	No. 3	Getterman Stadium; Waco, TX	8–0 ^{(5)}	**Smith** (4–0)	Brennan (0–1)	—	1,122	7–0	–
February 15	at No. 24 Baylor; Getterman Classic	No. 3	Getterman Stadium	9–1 ^{(5)}	**Deal** (1–0)	Walker (1–1)	—	1,126	8–0	–
February 16	vs. Hofstra; Getterman Classic	No. 3	Getterman Stadium	11–3 ^{(5)}	**Lowry** (3–0)	Venturini (0–1)	—	1,125	9–0	–
February 16	at No. 24 Baylor; Getterman Classic	No. 3	Getterman Stadium	8–0 ^{(5)}	**Landry** (2–0)	Ross (1–2)	—	1,125	10–0	–
February 22	vs. Tulsa; Norman Tournament	No. 2	Love's Field; Norman, OK	8–0 ^{(5)}	**Deal** (2–0)	Moore (4–3)	—	4,261	11–0	–
February 23	vs. Wichita State; Norman Tournament	No. 2	Love's Field	8–1	**Landry** (3–0)	Barber (2–3)	—	4,315	12–0	–
February 24	vs. Bowling Green; Norman Tournament	No. 2	Love's Field	8–5 ^{(8)}	**Landry** (4–0)	Krafcik (0–2)	—	3,771	13–0	–
February 24	vs. Abilene Christian; Norman Tournament	No. 2	Love's Field	9–1 ^{(5)}	**Monticelli** (1–0)	Russo (1–6)	**Smith** (1)	3,771	14–0	–
February 28	vs. Marshall	No. 2	Love's Field	9–1 ^{(5)}	**Smith** (5–0)	Cole (0–1)	—	3,976	15–0	–
February 28	vs. Kansas	No. 2	Love's Field	9–1 ^{(6)}	**Landry** (5–0)	Washington (2–1)	—	3,976	16–0	–

March (15–3)
Date	Opponent	Rank	Site	Score	Win	Loss	Save	Attendance	Overall Record	SEC Record
March 1	vs. Kansas	No. 2	Love's Field	8–0 ^{(5)}	**Lowry** (4–0)	Ludwig (3–2)	—	4,334	17–0	–
March 1	vs. Marshall	No. 2	Love's Field	11–0 ^{(5)}	**Deal** (3–0)	King (2–3)	—	4,334	18–0	–
March 2	vs. Kansas City	No. 2	Love's Field	17–1 ^{(5)}	**Deal** (4–0)	Bebb (0–6)	—	3,864	19–0	–
March 7	No. 11 South Carolina	No. 2	Love's Field	10–9	**Smith** (6–0)	Heard (10–1)	—	4,140	20–0	1–0
March 9	No. 11 South Carolina	No. 2	Love's Field	10–9	**Deal** (5–0)	Gress (3–1)	—	3,959	21–0	2–0
March 9	No. 11 South Carolina	No. 2	Love's Field	2–1	**Lowry** (5–0)	Heard (10–2)	—	3,959	22–0	3–0
March 12	at Tulsa	No. 1	Collins Family Softball Complex; Tulsa, OK	10–2 ^{(6)}	**Landry** (6–0)	Moore (8–6)	—	1,000	23–0	–
March 15	at No. 12 Arkansas	No. 1	Bogle Park; Fayetteville, AR	7–0	**Landry** (7–0)	Herron (7–2)	—	3,178	24–0	4–0
March 15	at No. 12 Arkansas	No. 1	Bogle Park	6–4	**Smith** (7–0)	Herron (7–3)	**Landry** (2)	3,178	25–0	5–0
March 16	at No. 12 Arkansas	No. 1	Bogle Park	10–7	**Monticelli** (2–0)	King (3–1)	**Landy** (3)	3,143	26–0	6–0
March 19	East Texas A&M	No. 1	Love's Field	8–0 ^{(5)}	**Deal** (6–0)	Olsen (0–2)	—	3,887	27–0	–
March 21	at Missouri	No. 1	Mizzou Softball Stadium; Columbia, MO	8–0 ^{(5)}	**Landry** (8–0)	McCann (7–5)	—	3,532	28–0	7–0
March 22	at Missouri	No. 1	Mizzou Softball Stadium	1–3	Harrison (7–4)	**Smith** (7–1)	Pannell (1)	4,146	28–1	7–1
March 23	at Missouri	No. 1	Mizzou Softball Stadium	5–1	**Landry** (9–0)	McCann (7–6)	—	2,551	29–1	8–1
March 26	at Wichita State	No. 2	Wilkins Stadium; Wichita, KS	19–16	**Landry** (10–0)	Aguilar (6–4)	—	1,245	30–1	–
March 28	No. 9 Tennessee	No. 2	Love's Field	2–5 ^{(8)}	Pickens (12–4)	**Landry** (10–1)	—	4,359	30–2	8–2
March 29	No. 9 Tennessee	No. 2	Love's Field	4–1	**Deal** (7–0)	Mardjetko (8–2)	—	4,483	31–2	9–2
March 30	No. 9 Tennessee	No. 2	Love's Field	3–5	Pickens (13–4)	**Landry** (10–2)	—	4,118	31–3	9–3

April (11–2)
Date	Opponent	Rank	Site	Score	Win	Loss	Save	Attendance	Overall Record	SEC Record
April 1	at UT Arlington	No. 2	Allan Saxe Field; Arlington, TX	13–2 ^{(5)}	**Smith** (8–1)	McDonnell (3–3)	—	1,228	32–3	–
April 3	St. Thomas; Okana Invitational	No. 2	Love's Field	12–4 ^{(5)}	**Deal** (8–0)	Cook (8–8)	—	3,623	33–3	–
April 4	UCF; Okana Invitational	No. 2	Love's Field	6–0	**Landry** (11–2)	Vega (7–4)	—	3,833	34–3	–
April 5	UCF; Okana Invitational	No. 2	Love's Field	Cancelled						
April 9	vs. No. 17 Oklahoma State	No. 2	Devon Park; Oklahoma City, OK	11–3 ^{(5)}	**Landry** (12–2)	Meylan (15–5)	—	9,259	35–3	–
April 12	at No. 23 Alabama	No. 2	Rhoads Stadium; Tuscaloosa, AL	5–1	**Landry** (13–2)	Briski (10–10)	—	4,400	36–3	10–3
April 13	at No. 23 Alabama	No. 2	Rhoads Stadium	1–6	Briski (11–10)	**Deal** (8–1)	—	4,400	36–4	10–4
April 14	at No. 23 Alabama	No. 2	Rhoads Stadium	1–2 ^{(8)}	Riley (10–1)	**Landry** (13–3)	—	4,098	36–5	10–5
April 18	No. 16 Mississippi State	No. 2	Love's Field	4–0	**Landry** (14–3)	Chaffin (18–7)	—	4,378	37–5	11–5
April 20	No. 16 Mississippi State	No. 2	Love's Field	6–5	**Smith** (9–1)	Marron (2–5)	**Landry** (1)	3,722	38–5	12–5
April 20	No. 16 Mississippi State	No. 2	Love's Field	9–6	**Landry** (15–3)	Marron (2–6)	—	3,695	39–5	13–5
April 25	No. 2 Texas	No. 3	Love's Field	7–6	**Landry** (16–3)	Kavan (20–4)	—	4,587	40–5	14–5
April 26	No. 2 Texas	No. 3	Love's Field	7–2	**Deal** (9–1)	Gutierrez (9–1)	—	4,538	41–5	15–5
April 27	No. 2 Texas	No. 3	Love's Field	9–8	**Landry** (17–3)	Salmon (6–1)	—	4,609	42–5	16–5

May (1–2)
Date	Opponent	Rank	Site	Score	Win	Loss	Save	Attendance	Overall Record	SEC Record
May 1	at No. 9 Florida	No. 1	Katie Seashole Pressly Softball Stadium; Gainesville, FL	6–5 ^{(9)}	**Landry** (18–3)	Brown (10–2)	—	2,106	43–5	17–5
May 2	at No. 9 Florida	No. 1	Katie Seashole Pressly Softball Stadium	4–9	Hammock (8–1)	**Deal** (9–2)	Brown (3)	2,505	43–6	17–6
May 3	at No. 9 Florida	No. 1	Katie Seashole Pressly Softball Stadium	4–6	Rothrock (12–5)	**Landry** (18–4)	Brown (4)	2,653	43–7	17–7

Postseason (9–2)

SEC tournament (2–0)
Date	Opponent	Rank	Site	Score	Win	Loss	Save	Attendance	Overall Record	SECT Record
May 8	(9) No. 10 LSU	(1) No. 2	Jack Turner Stadium; Athens, GA	4–1	**Landry** (19–4)	Berzon (17–7)	—	—	44–7	1–0
May 9	(5) No. 7 Arkansas	(1) No. 2	Jack Turner Stadium	8–6	**Lowry** (6–0)	Herron (17–6)	—	—	45–7	2–0
May 10	(2) No. 1 Texas A&M	(1) No. 2	Jack Turner Stadium	Cancelled						

Norman Regional (3–0)
Date	Opponent	Rank	Site/stadium	Score	Win	Loss	Save	Attendance	Overall record	Regional record
May 16	vs. Boston University	No. 2	Love's Field	8–0 ^{(5)}	**Landry** (20–4)	Ricard (26–11)	—	—	46–7	1–0
May 17	vs. California	No. 2	Love's Field	11–2 ^{(5)}	**Landry** (21–4)	Teperson (6–5)	—	—	47–7	2–0
May 18	vs. California	No. 2	Love's Field	12–1 ^{(5)}	**Landry** (22–4)	De Nava (13–6)	—	4,075	48–7	3–0

Norman Super Regional (2–0)
Date	Opponent	Rank	Site/stadium	Score	Win	Loss	Save	Attendance	Overall record	Super Reg. record
May 23	vs. No. 20 Alabama	No. 2	Love's Field	3–0	**Landry** (23–4)	Briski (17–13)	—	4,444	49–7	1–0
May 24	vs. No. 20 Alabama	No. 2	Love's Field	13–2 ^{(5)}	**Deal** (10–2)	Riley (11–4)	—	4,564	50–7	2–0

Women's College World Series (2–2)
Date	Opponent	Rank	Site/stadium	Score	Win	Loss	Save	Attendance	Overall Record	WCWS Record
May 29	vs. No. 7 Tennessee	No. 2	Devon Park	4–3	**Landry** (24–4)	Pickens (24–10)	—	—	51–7	1–0
May 31	vs. No. 3 Texas	No. 2	Devon Park	2–4	Kavan (26–5)	**Landry** (24–5)	—	—	51–8	1–1
June 1	vs. No. 6 Oregon	No. 2	Devon Park	4–1	**Landry** (25–5)	Grein (30–3)	—	12,458	52–8	2–1
June 2	vs. No. 10 Texas Tech	No. 2	Devon Park	2–3	Canady (33–5)	**Landry** (25–6)	—	—	52–9	2–2

- Win
- Loss
- Postponement
- Bold: Sooners team member
- Rankings from NFCA:
- (#) Tournament seedings in parentheses.

== Record vs. conference opponents ==
. Blank are not scheduled. Blue are home games, otherwise away.

2025 SEC softball records Source: 2025 SEC softball game results, 2025 SEC softball schedule
Tm	W–L	ALA	ARK	AUB	FLA	UGA	KEN	LSU	MSU	MIZ	OKL	OMS	SCA	TEN	TEX	TAM	Tm	SR	SW
ALA	12–12		.	.	1–2	2–1	.	1–2	1–2	3–0	2–1	.	1–2	.	.	1–2	ALA	3–5	1–0
ARK	14–10	.		.	2–1	.	3–0	2–1	.	.	0–3	1–2	2–1	2–1	.	2–1	ARK	6–2	1–1
AUB	6–18	.	.		0–3	2–1	2–1	.	0–3	.	.	.	2–1	0–3	0–3	0–3	AUB	3–5	0–5
FLA	14–10	2–1	1–2	3–0		.	.	1–2	.	.	2–1	2–1	.	.	1–2	2–1	FLA	5–3	1–0
UGA	7–16	1–2	.	1–2	.		.	1–2	.	1–2	.	1–2	1–2	1–2	.	0–2	UGA	0–8	0–0
KEN	7–17	.	0–3	1–2	.	.		0–3	1–2	3–0	.	2–1	0–3	.	0–3	.	KEN	2–6	1–4
LSU	12–12	2–1	1–2	.	2–1	2–1	3–0		.	.	.	.	1–2	.	1–2	0–3	LSU	4–4	1–1
MSU	13–11	2–1	.	3–0	.	.	2–1	.		2–1	0–3	2–1	.	1–2	1–2	.	MSU	5–3	1–1
MIZ	6–18	0–3	.	.	.	2–1	0–3	.	1–2		1–2	1–2	.	.	0–3	1–2	MIZ	1–7	0–3
OKL	17–7	1–2	3–0	.	1–2	.	.	.	3–0	2–1		.	3–0	1–2	3–0	.	OKL	5–3	4–0
OMS	11–13	.	2–1	.	1–2	2–1	1–2	.	1–2	2–1	.		1–2	1–2	.	.	OMS	3–5	0–0
SCA	13–11	2–1	1–2	1–2	.	2–1	3–0	2–1	.	.	0–3	2–1		.	.	.	SCA	5–3	1–1
TEN	15–9	.	1–2	3–0	.	2–1	.	.	2–1	.	2–1	2–1	.		2–1	1–2	TEN	6–2	1–0
TEX	16–8	.	.	3–0	2–1	.	3–0	2–1	2–1	3–0	0–3	.	.	1–2		.	TEX	6–2	3–1
TAM	16–7	2–1	1–2	3–0	1–2	2–0	.	3–0	.	2–1	.	.	.	2–1	.		TAM	6–2	2–0
Tm	W–L	ALA	ARK	AUB	FLA	UGA	KEN	LSU	MSU	MIZ	OKL	OMS	SCA	TEN	TEX	TAM	Team	SR	SW

Updated for entire regular season. One game TAM @ UGA cancelled.
Tie breakers: ARK>FLA hd to hd, SCA>MSU KEN common, LSU>ALA hd to hd, MIZ>AUB TAM common.

== Rankings ==
Ranking movements Legend: ██ Increase in ranking ██ Decrease in ranking
	Week															
Poll	Pre	1	2	3	4	5	6	7	8	9	10	11	12	13	14	Final
NFCA / USA Today	2	3	2	2	2	1	1	2	2	2	2	3	1	2	2	
Softball America	3	3	2	2	2	2	2	2	3	2	2	5	1	4	4	
ESPN.com/USA Softball	3	3	2	1	1	1	1	2	3	2	4	4	1	2	2	
D1Softball	3	4	2	1	1	1	1	2	3	2	5	5	1	3	3	
