= 2025 Arkansas Razorbacks softball team =

American college softball season

2025 Arkansas Razorbacks softball

NCAA Fayetteville Super Regional NCAA Fayetteville Regional champions
- Conference: Southeastern Conference

Ranking
- Coaches: No. 4
- Record: 44–14 (14–10 SEC)
- Head coach: Courtney Deifel (10th season)
- Assistant coaches: DJ Gasso; Danielle Gibson Whorton Matt Meuchel
- Home stadium: Bogle Park

2025 Southeastern Conference softball standings
	Conf.						Overall
Team	W		L		T	PCT	W		L		T	PCT
No. 3 Oklahoma ‍†‍‡‍^{y}	17	–	7	–	0	.708	52	–	9	–	0	.852
No. 14 Texas A&M ‍‍‡‍^{y}	16	–	7	–	0	.696	48	–	11	–	0	.814
No. 1 Texas ‍‍‍^{y}	16	–	8	–	0	.667	56	–	12	–	0	.824
No. 4 Tennessee ‍‍‍^{y}	15	–	9	–	0	.625	47	–	17	–	1	.731
No. 9 Arkansas ‍‍‍^{y}	14	–	10	–	0	.583	44	–	14	–	0	.759
No. 7 Florida ‍‍‍^{y}	14	–	10	–	0	.583	48	–	17	–	0	.738
No. 12 South Carolina ‍‍‍^{y}	13	–	11	–	0	.542	44	–	16	–	0	.733
No. 21 Mississippi State ‍‍‍^{y}	13	–	11	–	0	.542	39	–	19	–	0	.672
No. 19 LSU ‍‍‍^{y}	12	–	12	–	0	.500	42	–	16	–	0	.724
No. 15 Alabama ‍‍‍^{y}	12	–	12	–	0	.500	40	–	23	–	0	.635
No. 8 Ole Miss ‍‍‍^{y}	11	–	13	–	0	.458	42	–	21	–	0	.667
No. 22 Georgia ‍‍‍^{y}	7	–	16	–	0	.304	35	–	23	–	0	.603
Kentucky ‍‍‍^{y}	7	–	17	–	0	.292	31	–	28	–	0	.525
Auburn ‍‍‍^{y}	6	–	18	–	0	.250	34	–	23	–	0	.596
Missouri ‍‍‍	6	–	18	–	0	.250	25	–	31	–	0	.446
† – Conference champion ‡ – Tournament champion y – Invited to the NCAA tournament As of June 6, 2025; Rankings from NFCA/GoRout

The 2025 Arkansas Razorbacks softball team represented the University of Arkansas in the 2025 NCAA Division I softball season. The Razorbacks were led by tenth-year head coach Courtney Deifel and played their home games at Bogle Park in Fayetteville, Arkansas. Infielder Bri Ellis was named the 2025 SEC Player of the Year, 1st Team All-SEC, the Softball America National Player of the Year, the USA Softball Collegiate Player of the Year, and was named 1st team All-American. Ellis set the single-season program record for home runs (26) and RBIs (72).

On May 18, Arkansas won the Fayetteville Regional championship in the NCAA softball Tournament, and earned the right to host a Super Regional. On May 25, Arkansas lost to Ole Miss in the Fayetteville Super Regional, and was eliminated from the NCAA Tournament.

== Roster ==
2025 Arkansas Razorbacks softball team
Players
Coaches

#	Pos.	Name	Bats/throws	Height	Year	High school/junior college	Home town
1	OF	Raigan Kramer	L/R	5 ft 4 in (1.63 m)	Sr	Seaman HS	Topeka, Kansas
4	RHP	Reis Beuerlein	R/R	5 ft 9 in (1.75 m)	Jr	Pinnacle HS	Cave Creek, Arizona
5	OF	Ashtyn Reichardt	L/L	5 ft 7 in (1.7 m)	Fr	Katy HS	Katy, Texas
6	INF	Ella McDowell	R/R	5 ft 6 in (1.68 m)	Fr	Foster HS	Richmond, Texas
7	U	Courtney Day	R/R	5 ft 10 in (1.78 m)	Sr	Glenda Dawson HS	Pearland, Texas
11	LHP	Robyn Herron	R/L	5 ft 10 in (1.78 m)	Jr	Sickles HS	Tampa, Florida
12	RHP	Payton Burnham	R/R	5 ft 8 in (1.73 m)	Fr	Sheldon HS	Eugene, Oregon
13	U	Kasey Wood	R/R	5 ft 8 in (1.73 m)	So	Bentonville HS	Bentonville, Arkansas
14	INF	Karlie Davison	R/R	5 ft 8 in (1.73 m)	Jr	Chadwick School	Torrance, California
16	OF	Ramsey Walker	R/R	5 ft 7 in (1.7 m)	Fr	Calvary Baptist Academy	Shreveport, Louisiana
17	C	Kennedy Miller	R/R	5 ft 8 in (1.73 m)	So	Georgetown HS	Georgetown, Texas
21	OF	Ava Carter	L/R	5 ft 6 in (1.68 m)	Fr	Green County Tech HS	Paragould, Arkansas
23	OF	Reagan Johnson	L/R	5 ft 4 in (1.63 m)	Jr	Karnes City HS	Karnes City, Texas
25	RHP	Cam Harrison	R/R	6 ft 0 in (1.83 m)	Fr	Katy HS	Brookshire, Texas
26	INF	Atalyia Rijo	L/R	5 ft 7 in (1.7 m)	Jr	Corning-Painted Post HS	Horseheads, New York
28	U	Carlee Ratcliff	R/R	5 ft 5 in (1.65 m)	Sr	New Boston HS	New Boston, Texas
34	INF	Jayden Ramos	R/R	5 ft 10 in (1.78 m)	Fr	Central HS	Fresno, California
45	U	Jayden Wells	R/R	5 ft 6 in (1.68 m)	So	Paris HS	Paris, Arkansas
46	U	Kailey Wyckoff	L/L	5 ft 7 in (1.7 m)	Jr	Katy HS	Katy, Texas
77	INF	Bri Ellis	R/R	5 ft 10 in (1.78 m)	Sr	Memorial HS	Houston, Texas
99	RHP	Lexi King	R/R	5 ft 8 in (1.73 m)	Fr	Windermere HS	Windermere, Florida

Head coach

Courtney Deifel (California, 2003)

Assistant coach(es)

DJ Gasso (Bradley, 2017)
Danielle Gibson Whorton (Arkansas, 2022)
Matt Meuchel (Arizona State, 2000)

Legend

- (C) Team captain
- (S) Suspended
- (I) Ineligible
- Injured
- Current redshirt

Roster
Last update: March 23, 2025

== Schedule and results ==
2025 Arkansas Razorbacks softball game log (44–14)
Regular season (38–11)

February (16–1)
Date	Opponent	Rank	Site/stadium	Score	Win	Loss	Save	TV	Attendance	Overall record	SEC record
Texas State Tournament
February 6	at Texas State	No. 14	Bobcat Softball Stadium; San Marcos, Texas	**W** 3–1	**Herron** (1–0)	Azua (0–1)	**Harrison** (1)	ESPN+	791	1–0	—
February 7	vs. Lipscomb	No. 14	Bobcat Softball Stadium	**W** 23–0 (5)	**Beuerlein** (1–0)	Barefoot (0–1)				2–0	—
February 7	vs. Bradley	No. 14	Bobcat Softball Stadium	**W** 3–1	**Burnham** (1–0)	Organ (0–1)	**Harrison** (2)			3–0	—
February 8	vs. Bradley	No. 14	Bobcat Softball Stadium	**W** 9–1 (6)	**King** (1–0)	Kenne (0–2)				4–0	—
February 8	vs. San Diego	No. 14	Bobcat Softball Stadium	**W** 2–1	**Burnham** (2–0)	Tadlock (0–2)				5–0	—
LA Tech Classic
February 14	vs. Louisiana–Monroe	No. 13	Dr. Billy Bundrick Field; Shreveport, Louisiana	**W** 11–2 (6)	**Burnham** (3–0)	Nichols (0–3)			328	6–0	—
February 14	at Louisiana Tech	No. 13	Dr. Billy Bundrick Field	**W** 9–1 (5)	**Herron** (2–0)	Shull (0–1)		ESPN+	770	7–0	—
February 15	vs. Southern Miss	No. 13	Dr. Billy Bundrick Field	**W** 12–4 (6)	**King** (2–0)	Lee (1–2)			278	8–0	—
February 16	vs. Southern Miss	No. 13	Dr. Billy Bundrick Field	**W** 12–3 (5)	**Harrison** (1–0)	Herrington (0–2)			183	9–0	—
February 16	vs. Louisiana–Monroe	No. 13	Dr. Billy Bundrick Field	**W** 10–0 (5)	**Herron** (3–0) **NH**	Lake (2–2)			274	10–0	—
Mary Nutter Collegiate Classic
February 20	vs. Rutgers	No. 10	Big League Dreams Sports Park; Cathedral City, California	**W** 10–0 (5)	**Burnham** (4–0)	Hoekstra (1–2)		FloCollege	143	11–0	—
February 20	vs. Cal State Fullerton	No. 10	Big League Dreams Sports Park	**W** 10–0 (5)	**Herron** (4–0)	Garcia (5–2)		FloCollege	567	12–0	—
February 21	vs. Loyola Marymount	No. 10	Big League Dreams Sports Park	**W** 6–2	**Harrison** (2–0)	O'Dell (1–5)		FloCollege	598	13–0	—
February 22	vs. Baylor	No. 10	Big League Dreams Sports Park	**W** 8–0 (5)	**Herron** (5–0)	Orme (2–2)		FloCollege	646	14–0	—
February 22	vs. No. 4 UCLA	No. 10	Big League Dreams Sports Park	**L** 1–9 (6)	Terry (8–1)	**Burnham** (4–1)		FloCollege		14–1	—
Wooo Pig Classic
February 28	Iowa	No. 11	Bogle Park; Fayetteville, Arkansas	**W** 9–0 (5)	**Herron** (5–0)	Tretton (3–1)				15–1	—
February 28	Illinois	No. 11	Bogle Park	**W** 12–4 (6)	**Beuerlein** (2–0)	Wiles (4–2)			2,545	16–1	—

March (10–6)
Date	Opponent	Rank	Site/stadium	Score	Win	Loss	Save	TV	Attendance	Overall record	SEC record
March 1	Iowa	No. 11	Bogle Park	**W** 12–0 (5)	**Harrison** (3–0)	Downe (0–1)			2,881	17–1	—
March 1	Illinois	No. 11	Bogle Park	**W** 10–1 (6)	**Burnham** (5–1)	Park (0–1)			2,881	18–1	—
March 2	Missouri State	No. 11	Bogle Park	**W** 13–2 (5)	**King** (3–0)	Swick (0–4)			2,638	19–1	—
March 7	at No. 25 Ole Miss	No. 10	Ole Miss Softball Complex; Oxford, Mississippi	**L** 1–9 (6)	Guachino (9–3)	**Herron** (6–1)		SECN+	902	19–2	0–1
March 8	at No. 25 Ole Miss	No. 10	Ole Miss Softball Complex	**L** 3–9	Binford (4–0)	**Burnham** (5–2)		SECN+	1,160	19–3	0–2
March 9	at No. 25 Ole Miss	No. 10	Ole Miss Softball Complex	**W** 20–3 (5)	**Herron** (7–1)	Guachino (9–4)		SECN+	969	20–3	1–2
March 15 (DH)	No. 1 Oklahoma	No. 12	Bogle Park	**L** 0–7	Landry (7–0)	**Herron** (7–2)		SECN+	3,178	20–4	1–3
March 15 (DH)	No. 1 Oklahoma	No. 12	Bogle Park	**L** 4–6	Smith (7–0)	**Herron** (7–3)		SECN+	3,178	20–5	1–4
March 16	No. 1 Oklahoma	No. 12	Bogle Park	**L** 7–10	Monticelli (2–0)	**King** (3–1)		SEC Network	3,143	20–6	1–5
March 18	Central Arkansas	No. 14	Bogle Park	**W** 6–3	**Herron** (8–3)	Runner (3–9)		SECN+	2,392	21–6	—
March 22	at No. 7 Tennessee	No. 14	Sherri Parker Lee Stadium; Knoxville, Tennessee	**W** 6–3 (8)	**Herron** (9–3)	Pickens (10–4)		SEC Network	2,062	22–6	2–5
March 23	at No. 7 Tennessee	No. 14	Sherri Parker Lee Stadium	**W** 9–0	**Burnham** (6–2)	Nuwer (4–1)		SEC Network	2,040	23–6	3–5
March 24	at No. 7 Tennessee	No. 14	Sherri Parker Lee Stadium	**L** 2–3	Pickens (11–4)	**Harrison** (3–1)		SEC Network	1,746	23–7	3–6
March 28	Kentucky	No. 12	Bogle Park	**W** 5–3	**Burnham** (7–2)	Kelley (3–3)	**Herron** (1)	SECN+	2,945	24–7	4–6
March 29	Kentucky	No. 12	Bogle Park	**W** 10–2	**Herron** (10–3)	Haendiges (7–3)		SECN+	3,554	25–7	5–6
March 30	Kentucky	No. 12	Bogle Park	**W** 2–1	**Burnham** (8–2)	Fall (3–3)		SECN+	2,679	26–7	6–6

April (10–3)
Date	Opponent	Rank	Site/stadium	Score	Win	Loss	Save	TV	Attendance	Overall record	SEC record
April 4	at No. 3 Florida	No. 12	Katie Seashole Pressly Softball Stadium; Gainesville, Florida	**W** 4–1	**Herron** (11–3)	Oxley (5–4)		SECN+	1,890	27–7	7–6
April 5	at No. 3 Florida	No. 12	Katie Seashole Pressly Softball Stadium	**L** 7–10 (9)	Brown (9–0)	**Herron** (11–4)		ESPN2	1,971	27–8	7–7
April 6	at No. 3 Florida	No. 12	Katie Seashole Pressly Softball Stadium	**W** 9–5	**Harrison** (4–1)	Brown (9–1)	**Burnham** (2)	SECN+	1,907	28–8	8–7
April 7	at North Florida	No. 12	UNF Softball Complex; Jacksonville, Florida	**W** 14–0 (5)	**Burnham** (9–2)	Ponich (3–3)		ESPN+	177	29–8	—
April 11	No. 10 South Carolina	No. 12	Bogle Park	**W** 10–2 (6)	**Herron** (12–4)	Gress (8–5)		SECN+	2,958	30–8	9–7
April 12	No. 10 South Carolina	No. 12	Bogle Park	**L** 4–5	Lamb (9–0)	**Harrison** (4–2)	Gress (4)	SEC Network	3,535	30–9	9–8
April 13	No. 10 South Carolina	No. 12	Bogle Park	**W** 5–4	**Herron** (13–4)	Gress (8–6)		SECN+	2,867	31–9	10–8
April 15	at Central Arkansas	No. 11	Farris Field; Conway, Arkansas	**W** 7–0	**Burnham** (10–2)	Crowder (4–1)	**King** (1)		1,130	32–9	—
April 18 (DH)	Colorado State	No. 11	Bogle Park	**W** 14–1 (5)	**Herron** (14–4)	Wick (8–12)		SECN+	2,820	33–9	—
April 18 (DH)	Colorado State	No. 11	Bogle Park	**W** 8–0 (5)	**Beuerlein** (3–0) **PG**	Bentley (6–12)		SECN+	2,820	34–9	—
April 19	Colorado State	No. 11	Bogle Park	Game canceled							
April 25	at No. 1 Texas A&M	No. 9	Davis Diamond; College Station, Texas	**W** 7–5	**Herron** (15–4)	Kennedy (16–4)	**Burnham** (3)	SECN+	2,332	35–9	11–8
April 26	at No. 1 Texas A&M	No. 9	Davis Diamond	**W** 7–4	**Burnham** (11–2)	Lessentine (4–2)	**Herron** (2)	SECN+	2,418	36–9	12–8
April 27	at No. 1 Texas A&M	No. 9	Davis Diamond	**L** 0–2	Kennedy (17–4)	**Beuerlein** (3–1)		SEC Network	2,256	36–10	12–9

May (2–1)
Date	Opponent	Rank	Site/stadium	Score	Win	Loss	Save	TV	Attendance	Overall record	SEC record
May 1	No. 10 LSU	No. 8	Bogle Park	**W** 12–9	**Burnham** (12–2)	Berzon (17–6)	**Herron** (3)	SECN+	2,897	37–10	13–9
May 2	No. 10 LSU	No. 8	Bogle Park	**L** 2–13	Heavener (12–4)	**Herron** (15–5)		SECN+	3,689	37–11	13–10
May 3	No. 10 LSU	No. 8	Bogle Park	**W** 6–0	**Burnham** (13–2)	Clopton (7–2)		SECN+	3,803	38–11	14–10

Postseason (6–3)

SEC Tournament (2–1)
Date	Opponent	Rank	Site/stadium	Score	Win	Loss	Save	TV	Attendance	Overall record	SECT record
May 7	vs. (12) Georgia	(5) No. 7	Jack Turner Stadium; Athens, Georgia	**W** 5–1	**Herron** (16–5)	Roelling (9–8)		SEC Network	1,984	39–11	1–0
May 8	vs. (4) No. 5 Tennessee	(5) No. 7	Jack Turner Stadium	**W** 6–1	**Herron** (17–5)	Pickens (20–8)		SEC Network	1,958	40–11	2–0
May 9	vs. (1) No. 2 Oklahoma	(5) No. 7	Jack Turner Stadium	**L** 6–8	Lowry (6–0)	**Herron** (17–6)		ESPN2	1,898	40–12	2–1

NCAA Fayetteville Regional (3–0)
Date	Opponent	Rank	Site/stadium	Score	Win	Loss	Save	TV	Attendance	Overall record	NCAAT record
May 16	(4) Saint Louis	(1) No. 4	Bogle Park	**W** 10–0 (5)	**Burnham** (14–2) **NH**	Hochman (16–8)		ESPN+	3,038	41–12	1–0
May 17	(2) No. 24 Oklahoma State	(1) No. 4	Bogle Park	**W** 6–5 (8)	**Burnham** (15–2)	Meylan (21–9)		ESPN+	3,041	42–12	2–0
May 18	(2) No. 24 Oklahoma State	(1) No. 4	Bogle Park	**W** 12–0 (6)	**Herron** (18–6)	Meylan (21–10)		ESPN+	3,145	43–12	3–0

NCAA Fayetteville Super Regional (1–2)
Date	Opponent	Rank	Site/stadium	Score	Win	Loss	Save	TV	Attendance	Overall record	NCAAT record
May 23	No. 17 Ole Miss	(4) No. 4	Bogle Park	**L** 7–9	Guachino (15–12)	**Beuerlein** (3–2)	Binford (4)	ESPNU	3,157	43–13	3–1
May 24	No. 17 Ole Miss	(4) No. 4	Bogle Park	**W** 4–0	**Burnham** (16–2)	Lopez (13–5)		ESPN2	3,162	44–13	4–1
May 25	No. 17 Ole Miss	(4) No. 4	Bogle Park	**L** 4–7	Binford (11–3)	**Herron** (18–7)		ESPN2	3,149	44–14	4–2

*Denotes non–conference game • Schedule source • Rankings based on the teams' current ranking in the NFCA/USA Today poll
**W** Arkansas win • **L** Arkansas loss • Postponement or cancellation • **Bold** denotes Arkansas player

== Record vs. conference opponents ==
. Blank are not scheduled. Blue are home games, otherwise away.

2025 SEC softball records Source: 2025 SEC softball game results, 2025 SEC softball schedule
Tm	W–L	ALA	ARK	AUB	FLA	UGA	KEN	LSU	MSU	MIZ	OKL	OMS	SCA	TEN	TEX	TAM	Tm	SR	SW
ALA	12–12		.	.	1–2	2–1	.	1–2	1–2	3–0	2–1	.	1–2	.	.	1–2	ALA	3–5	1–0
ARK	14–10	.		.	2–1	.	3–0	2–1	.	.	0–3	1–2	2–1	2–1	.	2–1	ARK	6–2	1–1
AUB	6–18	.	.		0–3	2–1	2–1	.	0–3	.	.	.	2–1	0–3	0–3	0–3	AUB	3–5	0–5
FLA	14–10	2–1	1–2	3–0		.	.	1–2	.	.	2–1	2–1	.	.	1–2	2–1	FLA	5–3	1–0
UGA	7–16	1–2	.	1–2	.		.	1–2	.	1–2	.	1–2	1–2	1–2	.	0–2	UGA	0–8	0–0
KEN	7–17	.	0–3	1–2	.	.		0–3	1–2	3–0	.	2–1	0–3	.	0–3	.	KEN	2–6	1–4
LSU	12–12	2–1	1–2	.	2–1	2–1	3–0		.	.	.	.	1–2	.	1–2	0–3	LSU	4–4	1–1
MSU	13–11	2–1	.	3–0	.	.	2–1	.		2–1	0–3	2–1	.	1–2	1–2	.	MSU	5–3	1–1
MIZ	6–18	0–3	.	.	.	2–1	0–3	.	1–2		1–2	1–2	.	.	0–3	1–2	MIZ	1–7	0–3
OKL	17–7	1–2	3–0	.	1–2	.	.	.	3–0	2–1		.	3–0	1–2	3–0	.	OKL	5–3	4–0
OMS	11–13	.	2–1	.	1–2	2–1	1–2	.	1–2	2–1	.		1–2	1–2	.	.	OMS	3–5	0–0
SCA	13–11	2–1	1–2	1–2	.	2–1	3–0	2–1	.	.	0–3	2–1		.	.	.	SCA	5–3	1–1
TEN	15–9	.	1–2	3–0	.	2–1	.	.	2–1	.	2–1	2–1	.		2–1	1–2	TEN	6–2	1–0
TEX	16–8	.	.	3–0	2–1	.	3–0	2–1	2–1	3–0	0–3	.	.	1–2		.	TEX	6–2	3–1
TAM	16–7	2–1	1–2	3–0	1–2	2–0	.	3–0	.	2–1	.	.	.	2–1	.		TAM	6–2	2–0
Tm	W–L	ALA	ARK	AUB	FLA	UGA	KEN	LSU	MSU	MIZ	OKL	OMS	SCA	TEN	TEX	TAM	Team	SR	SW

Updated for entire regular season. One game TAM @ UGA cancelled.
Tie breakers: ARK>FLA hd to hd, SCA>MSU KEN common, LSU>ALA hd to hd, MIZ>AUB TAM common.

== Rankings ==
Ranking movements Legend: ██ Increase in ranking ██ Decrease in ranking т = Tied with team above or below ( ) = First-place votes
	Week															
Poll	Pre	1	2	3	4	5	6	7	8	9	10	11	12	13	14	Final
NFCA / USA Today	14	13	10	11	10	12	14	12	12	12	11	9	8	7т (1)	4	
Softball America	13	13	10	10	10	18	20	12	13	7	5	6	2	1	1	
ESPN.com/USA Softball	13	13	10	12	10т	15	16	14	13	10	10	9	6	6 (2)	3	
D1Softball	10	13	9	13	10	19	22	14	13	8	7	7	3	2	2	
