= 2025 SEC softball tournament =

Postseason collegiate softball tournament

2025 Southeastern Conference softball tournament
- Teams: 15
- Format: Single-elimination tournament
- Finals site: Jack Turner Stadium; Athens, Georgia
- Champions: Oklahoma & Texas A&M (1st title)
- Television: SEC Network; ESPN2; ESPN

2025 Southeastern Conference softball standings
	Conf.						Overall
Team	W		L		T	PCT	W		L		T	PCT
No. 3 Oklahoma ‍†‍‡‍^{y}	17	–	7	–	0	.708	52	–	9	–	0	.852
No. 14 Texas A&M ‍‍‡‍^{y}	16	–	7	–	0	.696	48	–	11	–	0	.814
No. 1 Texas ‍‍‍^{y}	16	–	8	–	0	.667	56	–	12	–	0	.824
No. 4 Tennessee ‍‍‍^{y}	15	–	9	–	0	.625	47	–	17	–	1	.731
No. 9 Arkansas ‍‍‍^{y}	14	–	10	–	0	.583	44	–	14	–	0	.759
No. 7 Florida ‍‍‍^{y}	14	–	10	–	0	.583	48	–	17	–	0	.738
No. 12 South Carolina ‍‍‍^{y}	13	–	11	–	0	.542	44	–	16	–	0	.733
No. 21 Mississippi State ‍‍‍^{y}	13	–	11	–	0	.542	39	–	19	–	0	.672
No. 19 LSU ‍‍‍^{y}	12	–	12	–	0	.500	42	–	16	–	0	.724
No. 15 Alabama ‍‍‍^{y}	12	–	12	–	0	.500	40	–	23	–	0	.635
No. 8 Ole Miss ‍‍‍^{y}	11	–	13	–	0	.458	42	–	21	–	0	.667
No. 22 Georgia ‍‍‍^{y}	7	–	16	–	0	.304	35	–	23	–	0	.603
Kentucky ‍‍‍^{y}	7	–	17	–	0	.292	31	–	28	–	0	.525
Auburn ‍‍‍^{y}	6	–	18	–	0	.250	34	–	23	–	0	.596
Missouri ‍‍‍	6	–	18	–	0	.250	25	–	31	–	0	.446
† – Conference champion ‡ – Tournament champion y – Invited to the NCAA tournament As of June 6, 2025; Rankings from NFCA/GoRout

The 2025 Southeastern Conference (SEC) softball tournament was held at Jack Turner Stadium on the campus of the University of Georgia in Athens, Georgia, from May 6 through May 10, 2025. The event determined the champion of the Southeastern Conference for the 2025 season. Oklahoma & Texas A&M were named co-champions due to inclement weather. Oklahoma received the SEC's automatic bid to the 2025 NCAA Division I softball tournament due to being the highest remaining seed in the SEC tournament.

This was the first year of a 15-team tournament.

== Record vs. conference opponents ==
. Blank are not scheduled. Blue are home games, otherwise away.

2025 SEC softball records Source: 2025 SEC softball game results, 2025 SEC softball schedule
Tm	W–L	ALA	ARK	AUB	FLA	UGA	KEN	LSU	MSU	MIZ	OKL	OMS	SCA	TEN	TEX	TAM	Tm	SR	SW
ALA	12–12		.	.	1–2	2–1	.	1–2	1–2	3–0	2–1	.	1–2	.	.	1–2	ALA	3–5	1–0
ARK	14–10	.		.	2–1	.	3–0	2–1	.	.	0–3	1–2	2–1	2–1	.	2–1	ARK	6–2	1–1
AUB	6–18	.	.		0–3	2–1	2–1	.	0–3	.	.	.	2–1	0–3	0–3	0–3	AUB	3–5	0–5
FLA	14–10	2–1	1–2	3–0		.	.	1–2	.	.	2–1	2–1	.	.	1–2	2–1	FLA	5–3	1–0
UGA	7–16	1–2	.	1–2	.		.	1–2	.	1–2	.	1–2	1–2	1–2	.	0–2	UGA	0–8	0–0
KEN	7–17	.	0–3	1–2	.	.		0–3	1–2	3–0	.	2–1	0–3	.	0–3	.	KEN	2–6	1–4
LSU	12–12	2–1	1–2	.	2–1	2–1	3–0		.	.	.	.	1–2	.	1–2	0–3	LSU	4–4	1–1
MSU	13–11	2–1	.	3–0	.	.	2–1	.		2–1	0–3	2–1	.	1–2	1–2	.	MSU	5–3	1–1
MIZ	6–18	0–3	.	.	.	2–1	0–3	.	1–2		1–2	1–2	.	.	0–3	1–2	MIZ	1–7	0–3
OKL	17–7	1–2	3–0	.	1–2	.	.	.	3–0	2–1		.	3–0	1–2	3–0	.	OKL	5–3	4–0
OMS	11–13	.	2–1	.	1–2	2–1	1–2	.	1–2	2–1	.		1–2	1–2	.	.	OMS	3–5	0–0
SCA	13–11	2–1	1–2	1–2	.	2–1	3–0	2–1	.	.	0–3	2–1		.	.	.	SCA	5–3	1–1
TEN	15–9	.	1–2	3–0	.	2–1	.	.	2–1	.	2–1	2–1	.		2–1	1–2	TEN	6–2	1–0
TEX	16–8	.	.	3–0	2–1	.	3–0	2–1	2–1	3–0	0–3	.	.	1–2		.	TEX	6–2	3–1
TAM	16–7	2–1	1–2	3–0	1–2	2–0	.	3–0	.	2–1	.	.	.	2–1	.		TAM	6–2	2–0
Tm	W–L	ALA	ARK	AUB	FLA	UGA	KEN	LSU	MSU	MIZ	OKL	OMS	SCA	TEN	TEX	TAM	Team	SR	SW

Updated for entire regular season. One game TAM @ UGA cancelled.
Tie breakers: ARK>FLA hd to hd, SCA>MSU KEN common, LSU>ALA hd to hd, MIZ>AUB TAM common.

== Format ==
All fifteen teams were seeded based on conference winning percentage and tie breakers, as necessary. They then will play a single-elimination tournament, with the top four seeds receiving two byes, seeds 5 through 9 receiving one bye and the bottom six seeds playing first-round games on May 6. The 15 team format is new this year with the addition of Oklahoma and Texas to the Southeastern Conference.

== Bracket ==
First round – May 6
14	Missouri	0
11	Ole Miss	1
15	Auburn	2
10	Alabama	3
13	Kentucky	0
12	Georgia (5 inn.)	8

Second round – May 7
11	Ole Miss (8 inn.)	6
6	Florida	4
10	Alabama	2
7	South Carolina	6
12	Georgia	1
5	Arkansas	5
8	Mississippi State	0
9	LSU	5

Quarter-finals – May 8
11	Ole Miss	6
3	Texas	7
7	South Carolina	4
2	Texas A&M (5 inn.)	12
5	Arkansas	6
4	Tennessee	1
9	LSU	1
1	Oklahoma	4

Semi-finals – May 9
3	Texas	2
2	Texas A&M	14
5	Arkansas	6
1	Oklahoma	8

Final – May 10
2	Texas A&M	-
1	Oklahoma	-

== First round ==
May 6, 2025 – 1:00 p.m. (EDT) Jack Turner Stadium in Athens, Georgia
Team	1	2	3	4	5	6	7	R	H	E
No. 13 Kentucky	0	0	0	0	0	x	x	0	3	1
No. 12 Georgia	3	0	0	5	x	x	x	8	8	0
WP: Lilli Backes LP: Carson Fall; Boxscore

May 6, 2025 – p.m. (EDT) Jack Turner Stadium in Athens, Georgia
Team	1	2	3	4	5	6	7	R	H	E
No. 14 Missouri	0	0	0	0	0	0	0	0	3	0
No. 11 Ole Miss	1	0	0	0	0	0	x	1	5	0
WP: Bri Lopez LP: Marissa McCann; Boxscore

May 6, 2025 – p.m. (EDT) Jack Turner Stadium in Athens, Georgia
Team	1	2	3	4	5	6	7	R	H	E
No. 15 Auburn	1	0	0	0	0	1	0	2	6	0
No. 10 Alabama	0	1	2	0	0	0	x	3	8	0
WP: Jocelyn Briski LP: SJ Geurin; Home runs: AUB: Top 1 — Nelia Peralta; ALA: None; Boxscore

== Second round ==
May 7, 2025 – 11:00 a.m. (EDT) Jack Turner Stadium in Athens, Georgia
Team	1	2	3	4	5	6	7	R	H	E
No. 9 LSU	0	4	0	1	0	0	0	5	9	0
No. 8 Mississippi State	0	0	0	0	0	0	0	0	1	0
WP: Jayden Heavener LP: Raelin Chaffin; Boxscore

May 7, 2025 – p.m. (EDT) Jack Turner Stadium in Athens, Georgia
Team	1	2	3	4	5	6	7	R	H	E
No. 12 Georgia	0	0	0	1	0	0	0	1	6	1
No. 5 Arkansas	0	0	0	0	1	0	4	5	5	0
WP: Robyn Herron LP: Randi Roelling; Home runs: UGA: None; ARK: 2 – Courtney Day & Bri Ellis; Boxscore

May 7, 2025 – 5 p.m. (EDT) Jack Turner Stadium in Athens, Georgia
Team	1	2	3	4	5	6	7	8	R	H	E
No. 11 Ole Miss	0	0	3	0	0	0	0	3	6	6	0
No. 6 Florida	0	0	1	0	0	0	2	0	3	9	1
WP: Bri Lopez LP: Ava Brown; Home runs: MISS: 2 — Percy Llamas and Mackenzie Pickens; FLA: 2 — Jocelyn Erickson and Taylor Shumaker; Boxscore

May 7, 2025 – p.m. (EDT) Jack Turner Stadium in Athens, Georgia
Team	1	2	3	4	5	6	7	R	H	E
No. 10 Alabama	2	0	0	0	0	0	0	2	5	0
No. 7 South Carolina	1	0	1	0	2	2	x	6	11	1
WP: Jori Heard LP: Jocelyn Briski; Home runs: ALA: Audrey Vandagriff; SC: Arianna Rodi (2); Boxscore

== Quarter-finals ==
May 8, 2025 – 11:00 a.m. (EDT) Jack Turner Stadium in Athens, Georgia
Team	1	2	3	4	5	6	7	R	H	E
No. 9 LSU	0	0	0	0	0	1	0	1	1	0
No. 1 Oklahoma	1	0	0	1	2	0	X	4	5	0
WP: Sam Landry LP: Sydney Berzon; Home runs: LSU: None; OKLA: 1 — Cydney Sanders

May 8, 2025 – 2 p.m. (EDT) Jack Turner Stadium in Athens, Georgia
Team	1	2	3	4	5	6	7	R	H	E
No. 5 Arkansas	0	0	0	2	0	0	4	6	7	2
No. 4 Tennessee	0	0	0	0	0	1	0	1	6	2
WP: Robyn Herron LP: Karlyn Pickens; Home runs: ARK: 1 — Raigan Kramer; TENN: None; Boxscore

May 8, 2025 – 5 p.m. (EDT) Jack Turner Stadium in Athens, Georgia
Team	1	2	3	4	5	6	7	R	H	E
No. 11 Ole Miss	0	0	0	1	5	0	0	6	9	1
No. 3 Texas	4	0	0	2	0	0	1	7	10	1
WP: Citlaly Gutierrez LP: Bri Lopez; Home runs: MISS: None; TEX: 1 — Kayden Henry; Boxscore

May 8, 2025 – 8 p.m. (EDT) Jack Turner Stadium in Athens, Georgia
Team	1	2	3	4	5	6	7	R	H	E
No. 7 South Carolina	0	1	1	1	1	-	-	4	4	5
No. 2 Texas A&M	0	4	0	2	6	-	-	12	12	0
WP: Emiley Kennedy LP: Sam Gress; Home runs: SC: 2 — Karley Shelton, Quincee Lilio; TAM: 2 — Kennedy Powell, Mya Perez; Attendance: 1,963

== Semi-finals ==
May 9, 2025 – 4:00 p.m. (EDT) Jack Turner Stadium in Athens, Georgia
Team	1	2	3	4	5	6	7	R	H	E
No. 5 Arkansas	2	1	3	0	0	0	0	6	9	0
No. 1 Oklahoma	0	1	1	2	0	1	3	8	11	1
WP: Audrey Lowry LP: Robyn Herron; Home runs: ARK: 1 — Kailey Wyckoff; OU: 6 — Sydney Barker (2), Ella Parker, Isabela Emerling, Ailana Agbayani, and Gabbie Garcia; Boxscore

May 9, 2025 – p.m. (EDT) Jack Turner Stadium in Athens, Georgia
Team	1	2	3	4	5	6	7	R	H	E
No. 3 Texas	0	0	0	2	0	x	x	2	5	2
No. 2 Texas A&M	6	5	3	0	x	x	x	14	11	0
WP: Emiley Kennedy LP: Mac Morgan; Home runs: TEX: None; TAM: 3 — KK Dement (2) and Amari Harper; Boxscore

== Final ==
Game canceled (May 10, 2025) due to inclement weather; Texas A&M and Oklahoma declared co-tournament champions
Team	1	2	3	4	5	6	7	R	H	E
No. 2 Texas A&M	x	x	x	x	x	x	x	0	0	0
No. 1 Oklahoma	x	x	x	x	x	x	x	0	0	0

== All-tournament team ==
The following players were members of the Southeastern Conference softball tournament All-tournament team.

Position	Player	School
P	Robyn Herron	Arkansas
INF	Sydney Barker	Oklahoma
INF	KK Dement	Texas A&M
INF	Amari Harper	Texas A&M
INF	Cydney Sanders	Oklahoma
INF	Koko Wooley	Texas A&M
OF	Raigan Kramer	Arkansas
OF	Ashton Maloney	Texas
U	Ella Parker	Oklahoma
U	Mia Scott	Texas
