= 2025 Florida Gators softball team =

American college softball season

2025 Florida Gators softball

NCAA Gainesville Regional champion NCAA Gainesville Super Regional champion
- Conference: Southeastern Conference
- Record: 48–17 (14–10 SEC)
- Head coach: Tim Walton (20th season)
- Assistant coaches: Aric Thomas (8th season); Francesca Enea (2nd season); Stephanie VanBrakle Prothro (1st season)
- Home stadium: Katie Seashole Pressly Softball Stadium

2025 Southeastern Conference softball standings
	Conf.						Overall
Team	W		L		T	PCT	W		L		T	PCT
No. 3 Oklahoma ‍†‍‡‍^{y}	17	–	7	–	0	.708	52	–	9	–	0	.852
No. 14 Texas A&M ‍‍‡‍^{y}	16	–	7	–	0	.696	48	–	11	–	0	.814
No. 1 Texas ‍‍‍^{y}	16	–	8	–	0	.667	56	–	12	–	0	.824
No. 4 Tennessee ‍‍‍^{y}	15	–	9	–	0	.625	47	–	17	–	1	.731
No. 9 Arkansas ‍‍‍^{y}	14	–	10	–	0	.583	44	–	14	–	0	.759
No. 7 Florida ‍‍‍^{y}	14	–	10	–	0	.583	48	–	17	–	0	.738
No. 12 South Carolina ‍‍‍^{y}	13	–	11	–	0	.542	44	–	16	–	0	.733
No. 21 Mississippi State ‍‍‍^{y}	13	–	11	–	0	.542	39	–	19	–	0	.672
No. 19 LSU ‍‍‍^{y}	12	–	12	–	0	.500	42	–	16	–	0	.724
No. 15 Alabama ‍‍‍^{y}	12	–	12	–	0	.500	40	–	23	–	0	.635
No. 8 Ole Miss ‍‍‍^{y}	11	–	13	–	0	.458	42	–	21	–	0	.667
No. 22 Georgia ‍‍‍^{y}	7	–	16	–	0	.304	35	–	23	–	0	.603
Kentucky ‍‍‍^{y}	7	–	17	–	0	.292	31	–	28	–	0	.525
Auburn ‍‍‍^{y}	6	–	18	–	0	.250	34	–	23	–	0	.596
Missouri ‍‍‍	6	–	18	–	0	.250	25	–	31	–	0	.446
† – Conference champion ‡ – Tournament champion y – Invited to the NCAA tournament As of June 6, 2025; Rankings from NFCA/GoRout

The 2025 Florida Gators softball team was an American college softball team that represents the University of Florida during the 2025 NCAA Division I softball season. The Gators, were led by head coach Tim Walton in his 20th season, and played their home games at Katie Seashole Pressly Softball Stadium in Gainesville, Florida.

== Previous season ==
The Gators finished the 2024 season 53–14 overall, and 17–7 in the SEC, finishing in second place in their conference. They won the 2024 SEC tournament, and received an automatic bid to the 2024 NCAA Division I softball tournament. During the NCAA tournament they advanced to the Women's College World Series before being eliminated by eventual tournament champion Oklahoma.

== Roster and personnel ==
2025 Florida Gators roster
Pitchers: 00 – Ava Brown – Sophomore; 7 – Keagan Rothrock – Sophomore; 13 – Olivia Miller – Sophomore; 18 – Kara Hammock – Senior; 39 – Katelynn Oxley – Freshman; Catchers: 8 – Jocelyn Erickson – Junior; 51 – Makenna Bellaire – Freshman; Outfielders: 2 – Kylie Shaw – Freshman; 21 – Taylor Shumaker – Freshman; 22 – Cassidy McLellan – Sophomore; 27 – Kendra Falby – Senior; 33 – Korbe Otis – Senior; 44 – Townsen Thomas – Freshman	Infielders: 4 – Rylee Holtorf – Graduate student; 9 – Alyssa Hovermale – Sophomore; 10 – Gabi Comia – Freshman; 11 – Mia Williams – Sophomore; 15 – Reagan Walsh – Senior; 31 – Kenleigh Cahalan – Junior; Utility: 1 – Brooke Barnard – Senior; 17 – Layla Lamar – Freshman

2025 Florida Gators coaching staff
- Tim Walton – Head coach
- Aric Thomas – Assistant coach
- Francesca Enea – Assistant coach
- Stephanie VanBrakle Prothro – Assistant coach

== Schedule and results ==
2025 Florida Gators Softball Game Log
Regular season (43–13)

February (20–1)
Date	Opponent	Rank	Stadium Site	Score	Win	Loss	Save	Attendance	Overall Record	SEC Record
February 6	North Florida	No. 3	Katie Seashole Pressly Stadium; Gainesville, FL	8–0 ^{(5)}	**Rothrock** (1–0)	Cook (0–1)	—	1,538	1–0	—
February 7	vs. Illinois State; USF-Rawlings Invitational	No. 3	USF Softball Stadium; Tampa, FL	10–2 ^{(6)}	**Brown** (1–0)	McLeod (0–1)	—	634	2–0	—
February 8	vs. Delaware; USF-Rawlings Invitational	No. 3	USF Softball Stadium; Tampa, FL	10–5	**Hammock** (1–0)	Kerwood (2–2)	—	989	3–0	—
February 8	vs. Michigan; USF-Rawlings Invitational	No. 3	USF Softball Stadium; Tampa, FL	11–1 ^{(5)}	**Rothrock** (2–0)	Hoehn (0–2)	—	1,054	4–0	—
February 9	vs. Georgia Southern; USF-Rawlings Invitational	No. 3	USF Softball Stadium; Tampa, FL	4–0	**Brown** (2–0)	Holland (1–1)	—	768	5–0	—
February 9	at USF; USF-Rawlings Invitational	No. 3	USF Softball Stadium; Tampa, FL	8–0 ^{(5)}	**Rothrock** (3–0)	Sardja (1–1)	—	1,814	6–0	—
February 11	Jacksonville	No. 2	Katie Seashole Pressly Stadium; Gainesville, FL	10–1 ^{(5)}	**Hammock** (2–0)	Harrelson (1–1)	—	1,298	7–0	—
February 12	Stetson	No. 2	Katie Seashole Pressly Stadium; Gainesville, FL	11–1 ^{(5)}	**Rothrock** (4–0)	Arnold (2–1)	—	1,180	8–0	—
February 13	vs. Boston College; Bubly Invitational	No. 2	Katie Seashole Pressly Stadium; Gainesville, FL	12–7	**Hammock** (3–0)	Dunning (1–1)	—	1,776	9–0	—
February 14	vs. Providence; Bubly Invitational	No. 2	Katie Seashole Pressly Stadium; Gainesville, FL	5–0	**Miller** (1–0)	Grifone (0–3)	—	2,658	10–0	—
February 14	vs. No. 14 Duke; Bubly Invitational	No. 2	Katie Seashole Pressly Stadium; Gainesville, FL	9–0 ^{(5)}	**Rothrock** (5–0)	Curd (2–1)	—	2,658	11–0	—
February 15	vs. Boston College; Bubly Invitational	No. 2	Katie Seashole Pressly Stadium; Gainesville, FL	3–0	**Rothrock** (6–0)	Kendziorski (0–3)	—	1,785	12–0	—
February 15	vs. Binghamton; Bubly Invitational	No. 2	Katie Seashole Pressly Stadium; Gainesville, FL	10–2 ^{(5)}	**Brown** (3–0)	Kennedy (1–3)	—	1,520	13–0	—
February 16	vs. No. 14 Duke; Bubly Invitational	No. 2	Katie Seashole Pressly Stadium; Gainesville, FL	1–8	Curd (3–1)	**Rothrock** (6–1)	—	1,721	13–1	—
February 19	at North Florida	No. 3	UNF Softball Complex; Jacksonville, FL	Postponed						
February 21	vs. California Baptist; Sun Devil Classic	No. 3	Alberta B. Farrington Softball Stadium; Tempe, AZ	11–0 ^{(5)}	**Brown** (4–0)	McConnell (1–5)	—	307	14–1	—
February 21	at Arizona State; Sun Devil Classic	No. 3	Alberta B. Farrington Softball Stadium; Tempe, AZ	9–1	**Rothrock** (7–1)	Creager (1–2)	—	307	15–1	—
February 22	vs. New Mexico State; Sun Devil Classic	No. 3	Alberta B. Farrington Softball Stadium; Tempe, AZ	12–1 ^{(5)}	**Oxley** (1–0)	Bennett (1–2)	—	1,159	16–1	—
February 22	vs. Grand Canyon; Sun Devil Classic	No. 3	Alberta B. Farrington Softball Stadium; Tempe, AZ	6–4	**Rothrock** (8–1)	Darwin (0–1)	**Brown** (1)	1,159	17–1	—
February 23	vs. Iowa State; Sun Devil Classic	No. 3	Alberta B. Farrington Softball Stadium; Tempe, AZ	24–3 ^{(5)}	**Miller** (2–0)	Schurman (2–4)	—	247	18–1	—
February 26	vs. FGCU; Florida Invitational	No. 3	Katie Seashole Pressly Stadium; Gainesville, FL	8–0 ^{(5)}	**Oxley** (2–0)	Sparkman (4–5)	—	1,182	19–1	—
February 28	vs. Samford; Florida Invitational	No. 3	Katie Seashole Pressly Stadium; Gainesville, FL	9–1 ^{(6)}	**Hammock** (4–0)	Partain (4–4)	—	1,372	20–1	—

March (13–4)
Date	Opponent	Rank	Stadium Site	Score	Win	Loss	Save	Attendance	Overall Record	SEC Record
March 1	vs. Troy; Florida Invitational	No. 3	Katie Seashole Pressly Stadium; Gainesville, FL	11–2 ^{(6)}	**Oxley** (3–0)	Ames (2–2)	—	1,502	21–1	—
March 1	vs. Western Michigan; Florida Invitational	No. 3	Katie Seashole Pressly Stadium; Gainesville, FL	10–2 ^{(6)}	**Brown** (5–0)	Fazzini (1–3)	—	2,207	22–1	—
March 2	vs. FAMU; Florida Invitational	No. 3	Katie Seashole Pressly Stadium; Gainesville, FL	9–1 ^{(6)}	**Miller** (3–0)	Hughes (2–6)	—	1,734	23–1	—
March 5	at Houston	No. 3	Cougar Softball Stadium; Houston, TX	11–0 ^{(5)}	**Hammock** (5–0)	Solis (3–2)	—	935	24–1	—
March 7	at No. 5 Texas A&M	No. 3	Davis Diamond; College Station, TX	2–3	Kennedy (6–2)	**Oxley** (3–1)	—	2,362	24–2	0–1
March 8	at No. 5 Texas A&M	No. 3	Davis Diamond; College Station, TX	12–4 ^{(6)}	**Brown** (6–0)	Sparks (5–1)	—	2,366	25–2	1–1
March 9	at No. 5 Texas A&M	No. 3	Davis Diamond; College Station, TX	4–2	**Hammock** (6–0)	Kennedy (6–3)	—	2,188	26–2	2–1
March 12	UCF	No. 3	Katie Seashole Pressly Stadium; Gainesville, FL	4–2	**Hammock** (7–0)	Lopez (2–4)	**Oxley** (1)	1,748	27–2	—
March 15	No. 2 Texas	No. 3	Katie Seashole Pressly Stadium; Gainesville, FL	2–7	Kavan (10–1)	**Oxley** (3–2)	Mac (1)	2,499	27–3	2–2
March 15	No. 2 Texas	No. 3	Katie Seashole Pressly Stadium; Gainesville, FL	7–13	Kavan (11–1)	**Hammock** (7–1)	—	2,150	27–4	2–3
March 17	No. 2 Texas	No. 3	Katie Seashole Pressly Stadium; Gainesville, FL	3–1	**Oxley** (4–2)	Mac (5–1)	**Brown** (2)	2,108	28–4	3–3
March 19	at Jacksonville	No. 4	Pruitt Softball Complex; Jacksonville, FL	5–2	**Brown** (7–0)	Harwood (2–1)	—	312	29–4	—
March 19	at North Florida	No. 4	UNF Softball Complex; Jacksonville, FL	8–0 ^{(5)}	**Oxley** (5–2)	Ponich (3–2)	—	726	30–4	—
March 26	at UCF	No. 4	UCF Softball Complex; Orlando, FL	0–4	Vega (6–2)	**Oxley** (5–3)	—	965	30–5	—
March 28	at No. 25 Auburn	No. 4	Jane B. Moore Field; Auburn, AL	11–7	**Hammock** (8–1)	Rainey (3–3)	—	2,068	31–5	4–3
March 29	at No. 25 Auburn	No. 4	Jane B. Moore Field; Auburn, AL	10–0	**Rothrock** (9–1)	Tresvik (0–1)	—	2,124	32–5	5–3
March 30	at No. 25 Auburn	No. 4	Jane B. Moore Field; Auburn, AL	4–3	**Brown** (8–0)	Geurin (15–6)	—	1,840	33–5	6–3

April (8–7)
Date	Opponent	Rank	Stadium Site	Score	Win	Loss	Save	Attendance	Overall Record	SEC Record
April 2	at No. 8 Florida State	No. 3	JoAnne Graf Field; Tallahassee, FL	0–4	Danley (7–1)	**Rothrock** (9–2)	Widra (1)	1,737	33–6	—
April 4	No. 12 Arkansas	No. 3	Katie Seashole Pressly Stadium; Gainesville, FL	1–4	Herron (11–3)	**Oxley** (5–4)	—	1,890	33–7	6–4
April 5	No. 12 Arkansas	No. 3	Katie Seashole Pressly Stadium; Gainesville, FL	10–7 ^{(9)}	**Brown** (9–0)	Herron (11–4)	—	1,971	34–7	7–4
April 6	No. 12 Arkansas	No. 3	Katie Seashole Pressly Stadium; Gainesville, FL	5–9	Harrison (4–1)	**Brown** (9–1)	Burnham (2)	1,907	34–8	7–5
April 9	at Stetson	No. 6	Patricia Wilson Field; DeLand, FL	13–5	**Miller** (4–0)	Mullen (2–3)	—	425	35–8	—
April 11	at No. 19 Ole Miss	No. 6	Ole Miss Softball Complex; Oxford, MS	8–7	**Rothrock** (10–2)	Lopez (7–2)	**Oxley** (3)	999	36–8	8–5
April 12	at No. 19 Ole Miss	No. 6	Ole Miss Softball Complex; Oxford, MS	14–3	**Brown** (10–1)	Binford (8–1)	—	1,287	37–8	9–5
April 13	at No. 19 Ole Miss	No. 6	Ole Miss Softball Complex; Oxford, MS	6–8	Lopez (8–2)	**Rothrock** (10–3)	—	1,204	37–9	9–6
April 17	No. 22 Alabama	No. 8	Katie Seashole Pressly Stadium; Gainesville, FL	4–7	Briski (12–10)	**Rothrock** (10–4)	Riley (2)	1,963	37–10	9–7
April 18	No. 22 Alabama	No. 8	Katie Seashole Pressly Stadium; Gainesville, FL	12–4 ^{(5)}	**Oxley** (6–4)	Hodges (1–1)	—	2,416	38–10	10–7
April 19	No. 22 Alabama	No. 8	Katie Seashole Pressly Stadium; Gainesville, FL	4–3	**Oxley** (7–4)	Riley (11–1)	—	2,293	39–10	11–7
April 23	USF	No. 8	Katie Seashole Pressly Stadium; Gainesville, FL	9–1 ^{(5)}	**Oxley** (8–4)	Dixon (17–6)	—	1,613	40–10	—
April 26	at No. 10 LSU	No. 8	Tiger Park; Baton Rouge, LA	14–4 ^{(6)}	**Rothrock** (11–4)	Heavener (11–4)	—	2,905	41–10	12–7
April 27	at No. 10 LSU	No. 8	Tiger Park; Baton Rouge, LA	1–2	Berzon (16–5)	**Oxley** (8–5)	—	2,213	41–11	12–8
April 28	at No. 10 LSU	No. 8	Tiger Park; Baton Rouge, LA	2–10 ^{(6)}	Berzon (17–5)	**Rothrock** (11–5)	—	1,924	41–12	12–9

May (2–1)
Date	Opponent	Rank	Stadium Site	Score	Win	Loss	Save	Attendance	Overall Record	SEC Record
May 1	No. 1 Oklahoma	No. 9	Katie Seashole Pressly Stadium; Gainesville, FL	5–6 ^{(9)}	Landry (18–3)	**Brown** (10–2)	—	2,106	41–13	12–10
May 2	No. 1 Oklahoma	No. 9	Katie Seashole Pressly Stadium; Gainesville, FL	9–4	**Hammock** (8–1)	Deal (9–2)	**Brown** (3)	2,505	42–13	13–10
May 3	No. 1 Oklahoma	No. 9	Katie Seashole Pressly Stadium; Gainesville, FL	6–4	**Rothrock** (12–5)	Landry (18–4)	**Brown** (4)	2,653	43–13	14–10

Postseason (5–4)

SEC tournament (0–1)
Date	Opponent	Rank	Site	Score	Win	Loss	Save	Attendance	Overall Record	SECT Record
May 7	No. 18 Ole Miss	No. 8	Jack Turner Stadium; Athens, GA	3–6 ^{(8)}	Binford (9–3)	**Brown** (10–3)	Lopez (2)	—	43–14	0–1

Gainesville Regional (3–0)
Date	Opponent	Rank	Site/stadium	Score	Win	Loss	Save	Attendance	Overall record	Regional record
May 16	vs. Mercer	No. 8	Katie Seashole Pressly Stadium	8–0 ^{(5)}	**Brown** (11–3)	Pitts (7–9)	—	2,140	44–14	1–0
May 17	vs. Florida Atlantic	No. 8	Katie Seashole Pressly Stadium	14–6 ^{(5)}	**Rothrock** (13–5)	Martinez (6–5)	**Brown** (5)	1,115	45–14	2–0
May 18	vs. Nercer	No. 8	Katie Seashole Pressly Stadium	8–0 ^{(5)}	**Rothrock** (14–5)	Pitts (8–10)	—	1,782	46–14	3–0

Gainesville Super Regional (2–1)
Date	Opponent	Rank	Site/stadium	Score	Win	Loss	Save	Attendance	Overall record	Super Reg. record
May 23	vs. Georgia	No. 8	Katie Seashole Pressly Stadium	6–1	**Rothrock** (15–5)	Roelling (11–9)	—	1,980	47–14	1–0
May 24	vs. Georgia	No. 8	Katie Seashole Pressly Stadium	1–2	Backes (16–10)	**Rothrock** (15–6)	Roelling (4)	2,144	47–15	1–1
May 25	vs. Georgia	No. 8	Katie Seashole Pressly Stadium	5–2	**Rothrock** (16–6)	Backes (16–11)	—	2,146	48–15	2–1

Women's College World Series (0–2)
Date	Opponent	Rank	Site/stadium	Score	Win	Loss	Save	Attendance	Overall record	WCWS record
May 29	vs. No. 3 Texas	No. 8	Devon Park; Oklahoma City, OK	0–3	Kavan (25–5)	**Rothrock** (16–7)	—	—	48–16	0–1
May 30	vs. No. 7 Tennessee	No. 8	Devon Park	3–11 ^{(5)}	Nuwer (6–4)	**Hammock** (9–2)	—	—	48–17	0–2

- Win
- Loss
- Postponement
- Bold: Gators team member
- Rankings from NFCA.
- (#) Tournament seedings in parentheses.

== Record vs. conference opponents ==
. Blank are not scheduled. Blue are home games, otherwise away.

2025 SEC softball records Source: 2025 SEC softball game results, 2025 SEC softball schedule
Tm	W–L	ALA	ARK	AUB	FLA	UGA	KEN	LSU	MSU	MIZ	OKL	OMS	SCA	TEN	TEX	TAM	Tm	SR	SW
ALA	12–12		.	.	1–2	2–1	.	1–2	1–2	3–0	2–1	.	1–2	.	.	1–2	ALA	3–5	1–0
ARK	14–10	.		.	2–1	.	3–0	2–1	.	.	0–3	1–2	2–1	2–1	.	2–1	ARK	6–2	1–1
AUB	6–18	.	.		0–3	2–1	2–1	.	0–3	.	.	.	2–1	0–3	0–3	0–3	AUB	3–5	0–5
FLA	14–10	2–1	1–2	3–0		.	.	1–2	.	.	2–1	2–1	.	.	1–2	2–1	FLA	5–3	1–0
UGA	7–16	1–2	.	1–2	.		.	1–2	.	1–2	.	1–2	1–2	1–2	.	0–2	UGA	0–8	0–0
KEN	7–17	.	0–3	1–2	.	.		0–3	1–2	3–0	.	2–1	0–3	.	0–3	.	KEN	2–6	1–4
LSU	12–12	2–1	1–2	.	2–1	2–1	3–0		.	.	.	.	1–2	.	1–2	0–3	LSU	4–4	1–1
MSU	13–11	2–1	.	3–0	.	.	2–1	.		2–1	0–3	2–1	.	1–2	1–2	.	MSU	5–3	1–1
MIZ	6–18	0–3	.	.	.	2–1	0–3	.	1–2		1–2	1–2	.	.	0–3	1–2	MIZ	1–7	0–3
OKL	17–7	1–2	3–0	.	1–2	.	.	.	3–0	2–1		.	3–0	1–2	3–0	.	OKL	5–3	4–0
OMS	11–13	.	2–1	.	1–2	2–1	1–2	.	1–2	2–1	.		1–2	1–2	.	.	OMS	3–5	0–0
SCA	13–11	2–1	1–2	1–2	.	2–1	3–0	2–1	.	.	0–3	2–1		.	.	.	SCA	5–3	1–1
TEN	15–9	.	1–2	3–0	.	2–1	.	.	2–1	.	2–1	2–1	.		2–1	1–2	TEN	6–2	1–0
TEX	16–8	.	.	3–0	2–1	.	3–0	2–1	2–1	3–0	0–3	.	.	1–2		.	TEX	6–2	3–1
TAM	16–7	2–1	1–2	3–0	1–2	2–0	.	3–0	.	2–1	.	.	.	2–1	.		TAM	6–2	2–0
Tm	W–L	ALA	ARK	AUB	FLA	UGA	KEN	LSU	MSU	MIZ	OKL	OMS	SCA	TEN	TEX	TAM	Team	SR	SW

Updated for entire regular season. One game TAM @ UGA cancelled.
Tie breakers: ARK>FLA hd to hd, SCA>MSU KEN common, LSU>ALA hd to hd, MIZ>AUB TAM common.

== Rankings ==
Ranking movements Legend: ██ Increase in ranking ██ Decrease in ranking
	Week																
Poll	Pre	1	2	3	4	5	6	7	8	9	10	11	12	13	14	15	Final
NFCA / USA Today	3	2	3	3	3	3	4	4	3	6	8	8	9	7	8		
Softball America	1	1	3	3	3	3	4	4	2	11	11	8	8	7	7		
ESPN.com/USA Softball	2	2	3	3	3	3	4	4	2	8	7	6	7	4	5		
D1Softball	1	1	3	3	3	3	3	3	2	9	8	8	11	7	7		
