= 2025 South Carolina Gamecocks softball team =

College softball season

2025 South Carolina Gamecocks softball

NCAA Regional
- Conference: Southeastern Conference
- Record: 42-15 (13-11 SEC)
- Head coach: Ashley Chastain (1st season)
- Assistant coaches: Katie Browder; Jody Davidson; Zack Parsons
- Home stadium: Carolina Softball Stadium at Beckham Field

2025 Southeastern Conference softball standings
	Conf.						Overall
Team	W		L		T	PCT	W		L		T	PCT
No. 3 Oklahoma ‍†‍‡‍^{y}	17	–	7	–	0	.708	52	–	9	–	0	.852
No. 14 Texas A&M ‍‍‡‍^{y}	16	–	7	–	0	.696	48	–	11	–	0	.814
No. 1 Texas ‍‍‍^{y}	16	–	8	–	0	.667	56	–	12	–	0	.824
No. 4 Tennessee ‍‍‍^{y}	15	–	9	–	0	.625	47	–	17	–	1	.731
No. 9 Arkansas ‍‍‍^{y}	14	–	10	–	0	.583	44	–	14	–	0	.759
No. 7 Florida ‍‍‍^{y}	14	–	10	–	0	.583	48	–	17	–	0	.738
No. 12 South Carolina ‍‍‍^{y}	13	–	11	–	0	.542	44	–	16	–	0	.733
No. 21 Mississippi State ‍‍‍^{y}	13	–	11	–	0	.542	39	–	19	–	0	.672
No. 19 LSU ‍‍‍^{y}	12	–	12	–	0	.500	42	–	16	–	0	.724
No. 15 Alabama ‍‍‍^{y}	12	–	12	–	0	.500	40	–	23	–	0	.635
No. 8 Ole Miss ‍‍‍^{y}	11	–	13	–	0	.458	42	–	21	–	0	.667
No. 22 Georgia ‍‍‍^{y}	7	–	16	–	0	.304	35	–	23	–	0	.603
Kentucky ‍‍‍^{y}	7	–	17	–	0	.292	31	–	28	–	0	.525
Auburn ‍‍‍^{y}	6	–	18	–	0	.250	34	–	23	–	0	.596
Missouri ‍‍‍	6	–	18	–	0	.250	25	–	31	–	0	.446
† – Conference champion ‡ – Tournament champion y – Invited to the NCAA tournament As of June 6, 2025; Rankings from NFCA/GoRout

The 2025 South Carolina Gamecocks softball team are an American college softball team that represent the University of South Carolina during the 2025 NCAA Division I softball season. The team is coached by Ashley Chastain in her first season with the team, and play their home games at Carolina Softball Stadium at Beckham Field.

== Record vs. conference opponents ==
. Blank are not scheduled. Blue are home games, otherwise away.

2025 SEC softball records Source: 2025 SEC softball game results, 2025 SEC softball schedule
Tm	W–L	ALA	ARK	AUB	FLA	UGA	KEN	LSU	MSU	MIZ	OKL	OMS	SCA	TEN	TEX	TAM	Tm	SR	SW
ALA	12–12		.	.	1–2	2–1	.	1–2	1–2	3–0	2–1	.	1–2	.	.	1–2	ALA	3–5	1–0
ARK	14–10	.		.	2–1	.	3–0	2–1	.	.	0–3	1–2	2–1	2–1	.	2–1	ARK	6–2	1–1
AUB	6–18	.	.		0–3	2–1	2–1	.	0–3	.	.	.	2–1	0–3	0–3	0–3	AUB	3–5	0–5
FLA	14–10	2–1	1–2	3–0		.	.	1–2	.	.	2–1	2–1	.	.	1–2	2–1	FLA	5–3	1–0
UGA	7–16	1–2	.	1–2	.		.	1–2	.	1–2	.	1–2	1–2	1–2	.	0–2	UGA	0–8	0–0
KEN	7–17	.	0–3	1–2	.	.		0–3	1–2	3–0	.	2–1	0–3	.	0–3	.	KEN	2–6	1–4
LSU	12–12	2–1	1–2	.	2–1	2–1	3–0		.	.	.	.	1–2	.	1–2	0–3	LSU	4–4	1–1
MSU	13–11	2–1	.	3–0	.	.	2–1	.		2–1	0–3	2–1	.	1–2	1–2	.	MSU	5–3	1–1
MIZ	6–18	0–3	.	.	.	2–1	0–3	.	1–2		1–2	1–2	.	.	0–3	1–2	MIZ	1–7	0–3
OKL	17–7	1–2	3–0	.	1–2	.	.	.	3–0	2–1		.	3–0	1–2	3–0	.	OKL	5–3	4–0
OMS	11–13	.	2–1	.	1–2	2–1	1–2	.	1–2	2–1	.		1–2	1–2	.	.	OMS	3–5	0–0
SCA	13–11	2–1	1–2	1–2	.	2–1	3–0	2–1	.	.	0–3	2–1		.	.	.	SCA	5–3	1–1
TEN	15–9	.	1–2	3–0	.	2–1	.	.	2–1	.	2–1	2–1	.		2–1	1–2	TEN	6–2	1–0
TEX	16–8	.	.	3–0	2–1	.	3–0	2–1	2–1	3–0	0–3	.	.	1–2		.	TEX	6–2	3–1
TAM	16–7	2–1	1–2	3–0	1–2	2–0	.	3–0	.	2–1	.	.	.	2–1	.		TAM	6–2	2–0
Tm	W–L	ALA	ARK	AUB	FLA	UGA	KEN	LSU	MSU	MIZ	OKL	OMS	SCA	TEN	TEX	TAM	Team	SR	SW

Updated for entire regular season. One game TAM @ UGA cancelled.
Tie breakers: ARK>FLA hd to hd, SCA>MSU KEN common, LSU>ALA hd to hd, MIZ>AUB TAM common.

== Roster ==
2025 South Carolina Gamecocks softball team
Players
Coaches

#	Pos.	Name	Bats/throws	Height	Year	High school/junior college	Home town
2	INF	Ella Chancey	R/R	5 ft 11 in (1.8 m)	Sr	Madsion County; Charlotte	Athens, GA
3		Shae Anderson	R/R	5 ft 7 in (1.7 m)	Fr	Moorpark	Moorpark, CA
4	INF	Brooke Blankenship	R/R	5 ft 5 in (1.65 m)	Sr	River Ridge	Hudson, FL
5	OF	Carlie Henderson	L/R	5 ft 6 in (1.68 m)	RS Sr	Calhoun	Calhoun, GA
7	OF	Abigail Knight	L/R	5 ft 5 in (1.65 m)	Sr	Robbinsville	Robbinsville, NC
9	RHP	Sam Gress	R/R	5 ft 7 in (1.7 m)	Sr	Central Dauphin; Charlotte	Harrisburg, PA
12	C	Audrey Wilson	R/R	5 ft 5 in (1.65 m)	Fr	Catawba Ridge	Fort Mill, SC
14	RHP	Kadie Becker	R/R	5 ft 9 in (1.75 m)	So	South Caldwell High School; Charlotte	Granite Falls, NC
15	C	Lexi Winters	R/R	5 ft 5 in (1.65 m)	Jr	White Knoll; Charlotte	Lexington, SC
16	INF	Arianna Rodi	R/R	5 ft 8 in (1.73 m)	Jr	La Salle Academy; Charlotte	Cranston, RI
17	OF	Emily Vinson	R/R	5 ft 6 in (1.68 m)	Sr	Lugoff-Elgin; Longwood	Elgin, SC
20	RHP	Olivia Kotowski	R/R	5 ft 9 in (1.75 m)	Fr	Parkview	Lilburn, GA
21	INF	Natalie Heath	R/R	5 ft 8 in (1.73 m)	RS Jr	Northgate	Sharpsburg, GA
22	OF	Nia McKnight	R/R	5 ft 3 in (1.6 m)	Fr	Grayson	Loganville, GA
24	RHP	Nealy Lamb	R/R	5 ft 11 in (1.8 m)	So	Williamsburg Academy; Charleston Southern	Cades, SC
25	RHP	Jori Heard	R/R	5 ft 11 in (1.8 m)	Jr	Huntley	Algonuin, IL
26	OF	Chloe Lackey	R/R	5 ft 5 in (1.65 m)	Fr	Oliver Springs	Oliver Springs, TN
31	C	Mya Flindt	R/R	5 ft 10 in (1.78 m)	Fr	Whitney	Rocklin, CA
33	INF	Karley Shelton	L/R	5 ft 5 in (1.65 m)	So	Lexington	Lexington, SC
43		Quincee Lilio	L/R	5 ft 2 in (1.57 m)	RS Jr	Great Oak; Oklahoma	Oceanside, CA
44		Emma Sellers	R/R	5 ft 9 in (1.75 m)	Sr	Los Alamitos	Lakewood, CA

Head coach

Ashley Chastain Woodard

Assistant coach(es)

Katie Browder
Jody Davidson
Zack Parsons

Legend

- (C) Team captain
- (S) Suspended
- (I) Ineligible
- Injured
- Current redshirt

Roster

== See also ==
- List of NCAA Division I softball programs

== See also ==
- 2025 South Carolina Gamecocks baseball team
