= 2025 Georgia Bulldogs softball team =

American college softball season

2025 Georgia Bulldogs softball

Durham Regional champion

Gainesville Super Regional, 1–2
- Conference: Southeastern Conference

Ranking
- Coaches: No. 22
- Record: 35–23 (7–16 SEC)
- Head coach: Tony Baldwin (4th season)
- Assistant coaches: J.T. D'Amico (4th season); Chelsea Wilkinson (4th season); Mike Davenport (1st season)
- Home stadium: Jack Turner Stadium

2025 Southeastern Conference softball standings
	Conf.						Overall
Team	W		L		T	PCT	W		L		T	PCT
No. 3 Oklahoma ‍†‍‡‍^{y}	17	–	7	–	0	.708	52	–	9	–	0	.852
No. 14 Texas A&M ‍‍‡‍^{y}	16	–	7	–	0	.696	48	–	11	–	0	.814
No. 1 Texas ‍‍‍^{y}	16	–	8	–	0	.667	56	–	12	–	0	.824
No. 4 Tennessee ‍‍‍^{y}	15	–	9	–	0	.625	47	–	17	–	1	.731
No. 9 Arkansas ‍‍‍^{y}	14	–	10	–	0	.583	44	–	14	–	0	.759
No. 7 Florida ‍‍‍^{y}	14	–	10	–	0	.583	48	–	17	–	0	.738
No. 12 South Carolina ‍‍‍^{y}	13	–	11	–	0	.542	44	–	16	–	0	.733
No. 21 Mississippi State ‍‍‍^{y}	13	–	11	–	0	.542	39	–	19	–	0	.672
No. 19 LSU ‍‍‍^{y}	12	–	12	–	0	.500	42	–	16	–	0	.724
No. 15 Alabama ‍‍‍^{y}	12	–	12	–	0	.500	40	–	23	–	0	.635
No. 8 Ole Miss ‍‍‍^{y}	11	–	13	–	0	.458	42	–	21	–	0	.667
No. 22 Georgia ‍‍‍^{y}	7	–	16	–	0	.304	35	–	23	–	0	.603
Kentucky ‍‍‍^{y}	7	–	17	–	0	.292	31	–	28	–	0	.525
Auburn ‍‍‍^{y}	6	–	18	–	0	.250	34	–	23	–	0	.596
Missouri ‍‍‍	6	–	18	–	0	.250	25	–	31	–	0	.446
† – Conference champion ‡ – Tournament champion y – Invited to the NCAA tournament As of June 6, 2025; Rankings from NFCA/GoRout

The 2025 Georgia Bulldogs softball team was an American college softball team that represented the University of Georgia during the 2025 NCAA Division I softball season. The team was coached by Tony Baldwin in his fourth season and played their home games at Jack Turner Stadium in Athens, Georgia.

== Previous season ==
The Bulldogs finished the 2024 season 43–19 overall, and 12–12 in the SEC, finishing in sixth place in their conference. In the 2024 SEC tournament, the Bulldogs defeated Auburn in the second round, before falling to the eventual champions, Florida, in the quarterfinals. Georgia was selected to host an NCAA regional as the No. 11 national seed in the 2024 NCAA Division I softball tournament. During the NCAA tournament, they won the Athens Regional and advanced to the Los Angeles Super Regional, where they were eliminated by UCLA.

== Roster and personnel ==
=== Roster ===
2025 Georgia Bulldogs roster
Pitchers: 5 – Rachel Gibson – Senior; 30 – Destin Howard – Junior; 34 – Randi Roelling – Sophomore; 77 – Ella Troutt – Freshman; 99 – Lilli Backes – Senior; Catchers: 7 – Sarah Gordon – Junior; 11 – Lyndi Rae Davis – Graduate; 56 – Marisa Miller – Junior; Outfielders: 1 – Dallis Goodnight – Senior; 2 – Jaydyn Goodwin – Junior	Infielders: 3 – Tyah Charlton – Freshman; 4 – Tyler Ellison – Junior; 9 – Precious Bross – Freshman; 22 – Emily Digby – Sophomore; 24 – Paislie Allen – Freshman; 27 – Hannah Davila – Sophomore; Utility: 8 – Mua Williams – Freshman; 10 – Mollie Mitchell – Freshman; 17 – Emma Castorri – Sophomore; 20 – Esther White – Freshman

=== Coaching staff ===
2025 Georgia Bulldogs coaching staff
- Tony Baldwin – Head coach
- J.T. D'Amico – Associate head coach
- Chelsea Wilkinson – Assistant coach
- Mike Davenport – Assistant coach

== Schedule ==
2025 Georgia Bulldogs softball game log
Regular season (30–19)

February (16–1)
Date	Opponent	Rank	Site	Score	Win	Loss	Save	Attendance	Overall Record	SEC Record
February 6	vs. NC State; Black and Gold Classic	No. 12	UCF Softball Complex; Orlando, FL	9–0^{5}	**Backes** (1–0)	Inscoe (0–1)	—	—	1–0	–
February 6	at UCF; Black and Gold Classic	No. 12	UCF Softball Complex	4–0	**Roelling** (1–0)	Lopez (0–1)	—	580	2–0	–
February 7	vs. Illinois; Black and Gold Classic	No. 12	UCF Softball Complex	7–4	**Backes** (2–0)	Nuechterlein (0–1)	—	—	3–0	–
February 8	vs. James Madison; Black and Gold Classic	No. 12	UCF Softball Complex	10–0^{5}	**Gibson** (1–0)	Fleet (0–2)	—	—	4–0	–
February 9	vs. CSU Bakersfield; Black and Gold Classic	No. 12	UCF Softball Complex	8–0^{5}	**Roelling** (2–0)	Ramirez (0–2)	—	—	5–0	–
February 13	Michigan; Red and Black Showcase	No. 10	Jack Turner Stadium; Athens, GA	3–2	**Backes** (3–0)	Derkowski (2–1)	**Roelling** (1)	1,501	6–0	–
February 14	Michigan State; Red and Black Showcase	No. 10	Jack Turner Stadium	10–2^{5}	**Gibson** (2–0)	Guidry (0–2)	—	1,665	7–0	–
February 15	Michigan; Red and Black Showcase	No. 10	Jack Turner Stadium	Cancelled						
February 15	Michigan State; Red and Black Showcase	No. 10	Jack Turner Stadium	Cancelled						
February 16	Longwood; Red and Black Showcase	No. 10	Jack Turner Stadium	11–5	**Roelling** (3–0)	Chapin (1–3)	—	1,818	8–0	–
February 16	Western Carolina; Red and Black Showcase	No. 10	Jack Turner Stadium	12–6	**Troutt** (1–0)	Juett (0–4)	—	1,818	9–0	–
February 20	Buffalo; Georgia Classic	No. 9	Jack Turner Stadium	11–3^{5}	**Backes** (4–0)	Russ (1–2)	—	503	10–0	–
February 20	Buffalo; Georgia Classic	No. 9	Jack Turner Stadium	Cancelled						
February 21	Appalachian State; Georgia Classic	No. 9	Jack Turner Stadium	5–4	**Backes** (5–0)	Varadi (0–2)	—	1,516	11–0	–
February 22	Syracuse; Georgia Classic	No. 9	Jack Turner Stadium	8–2	**Backes** (6–0)	Jackson (0–1)	—	1,710	12–0	–
February 23	Syracuse; Georgia Classic	No. 9	Jack Turner Stadium	3–1	**Roelling** (4–0)	Knight (4–1)	—	1,604	13–0	–
February 23	Utah Valley; Georgia Classic	No. 9	Jack Turner Stadium	10–0^{6}	**Gibson** (3–0)	Sapp (3–5)	—	1,604	14–0	–
February 26	at Clemson	No. 10	McWhorter Stadium; Clemson, SC	3–5	McCubbin (3–2)	**Roelling** (4–1)	—	1,623	14–1	–
February 28	Stetson; Bulldog Classic	No. 10	Jack Turner Stadium	5–2	**Backes** (7–0)	Arnold (4–3)	—	1,546	15–1	–
February 28	UMBC; Bulldog Classic	No. 10	Jack Turner Stadium	10–2^{5}	**Troutt** (2–0)	Matter (1–3)	—	1,546	16–1	–

March (9–9)
Date	Opponent	Rank	Site	Score	Win	Loss	Save	Attendance	Overall Record	SEC Record
March 1	Stetson; Bulldog Classic	No. 10	Jack Turner Stadium	1–0	**Gibson** (4–0)	Kulczyski (1–3)	—	1,881	17–1	–
March 1	Ohio State; Bulldog Classic	No. 9	Jack Turner Stadium	7–6	**Backes** (8–0)	Kay (3–2)	—	1,881	18–1	–
March 2	Ohio State; Bulldog Classic	No. 9	Jack Turner Stadium	0–7	Boutte (7–2)	**Gibson (4–1)**	—	1,730	18–2	–
March 7	No. 7 Tennessee	No. 13	Jack Turner Stadium	1–6	Pickens (6–2)	**Backes** (8–1)	—	2,071	18–3	0–1
March 8	No. 7 Tennessee	No. 13	Jack Turner Stadium	4–3^{9}	**Roelling** (5–1)	Pickens (6–3)	—	2,316	19–3	1–1
March 9	No. 7 Tennessee	No. 13	Jack Turner Stadium	2–5	Mardjetko (7–1)	**Roelling** (5–2)	—	2,198	19–4	1–2
March 12	Georgia Southern	No. 13	Jack Turner Stadium	1–0	**Backes** (9–1)	Johnson (8–4)	—	1,854	20–4	–
March 14	at No. 9 South Carolina	No. 13	Carolina Softball Stadium; Columbia, SC	7–3	**Roelling** (6–2)	Lamb (5–1)	—	1,160	21–4	2–2
March 15	at No. 9 South Carolina	No. 13	Carolina Softball Stadium	3–4	Gress (4–2)	**Backes** (9–2)	—	1,579	21–5	2–3
March 16	at No. 9 South Carolina	No. 13	Carolina Softball Stadium	2–3	Gress (5–2)	**Roelling (6–3)**	—	992	21–6	2–4
March 19	Georgia State	No. 13	Jack Turner Stadium	8–0^{5}	**Gibson** (5–1)	Hodnett (2–6)	—	1,546	22–6	–
March 21	No. 3 LSU	No. 13	Jack Turner Stadium	3–5	Berzon (13–0)	**Roelling** (6–4)	—	2,323	22–7	2–5
March 22	No. 3 LSU	No. 13	Jack Turner Stadium	2–10^{6}	Heavener (8–1)	**Backes** (9–3)	—	2,297	22–8	2–6
March 23	No. 3 LSU	No. 13	Jack Turner Stadium	11–3^{5}	**Roelling** (7–4)	Berzon (13–1)	—	2,478	23–8	3–6
March 26	No. 17 Oklahoma State	No. 15	Jack Turner Stadium	8–4	**Roelling** (8–4)	Meylan (12–3)	**Backes** (1)	1,682	24–8	–
March 28	at Alabama	No. 15	Rhoads Stadium; Tuscaloosa, AL	4–3	**Backes** (10–3)	Winstead (6–2)	**Roelling** (2)	3,916	25–8	4–6
March 29	at Alabama	No. 15	Rhoads Stadium	4–5	Riley (7–1)	**Roelling** (8–5)	Briski (2)	3,886	25–9	4–7
March 30	at Alabama	No. 15	Rhoads Stadium	5–8	Winstead (7–2)	**Backes** (10–4)	Briski (3)	3,791	25–10	4–8

April (4–7)
Date	Opponent	Rank	Site	Score	Win	Loss	Save	Attendance	Overall Record	SEC Record
April 2	Mercer	No. 16	Jack Turner Stadium	2–5	Pitts (6–4)	**Gibson** (5–2)	Taylor (3)	1,584	25–11	–
April 5	No. 4 Texas A&M	No. 16	Jack Turner Stadium	0–8^{6}	Kennedy (12–3)	**Roelling** (8–6)	—	—	25–12	4–9
April 5	No. 4 Texas A&M	No. 16	Jack Turner Stadium	5–12	Leavitt (3–0)	**Backes** (10–5)	—	2,478	25–13	4–10
April 7	No. 4 Texas A&M	No. 16	Jack Turner Stadium	Cancelled						
April 9	USC Upstate	No. 18	Jack Turner Stadium	3–2^{9}	**Backes** (11–5)	Kardatzke (4–4)	—	1,825	26–13	–
April 11	at Auburn	No. 18	Jane B. Moore Field; Auburn, AL	10–11	Rainey (5–3)	**Backes** (11–6)	—	1,851	26–14	4–11
April 12	at Auburn	No. 18	Jane B. Moore Field	10–5	**Gibson** (6–2)	**Geurin** (17–8)	**Roelling** (3)	2,316	27–14	5–11
April 13	at Auburn	No. 18	Jane B. Moore Field	4–8	Rainey (6–3)	**Backes** (11–7)	—	1,758	27–15	5–12
April 17	No. 17 Ole Miss	No. 23	Jack Turner Stadium	11–20	Lopez (8–2)	**Howard** (0–1)	Binford (2)	1,720	27–16	5–13
April 18	No. 17 Ole Miss	No. 23	Jack Turner Stadium	6–4	**Backes** (12–7)	Binford (8–2)	–	1,937	28–16	6–13
April 19	No. 17 Ole Miss	No. 23	Jack Turner Stadium	3–5	Lopez (10–2)	**Roelling** (8–7)	—	2,072	28–17	6–14
April 22	at Georgia Tech	No. 24	Mewborn Field; Atlanta, GA	5–2	**Backes** (13–7)	Voyles (11–6)	—	752	29–17	–

May (1–2)
Date	Opponent	Rank	Site	Score	Win	Loss	Save	Attendance	Overall Record	SEC Record
May 1	at Missouri		Mizzou Softball Stadium; Columbia, MO	2–4	McCann (10–11)	**Backes** (13–8)	Pannell (2)	2,363	29–18	6–15
May 2	at Missouri		Mizzou Softball Stadium	3–2	**Roelling** (9–7)	Pannell (5–9)	–	3,209	30–18	7–15
May 3	at Missouri		Mizzou Softball Stadium	0–1	Harrison (10–8)	**Backes** (13–9)	Pannell (3)	3,223	30–19	7–16

Postseason (5–4)

SEC Tournament (1–1)
Date	Opponent	Rank	Site	Score	Win	Loss	Save	Attendance	Overall Record	SECT Record
May 6	(13) Kentucky	(12)	Jack Turner Stadium	8–0^{5}	**Backes** (14–9)	Fall (6–7)	—	—	31–19	1–0
May 7	(5) No. 7 Arkansas	(12)	Jack Turner Stadium	1–5	Herron (16–5)	**Roelling** (9–8)	—	1,984	31–20	1–1

Durham Regional (3–1)
Date	Opponent	Rank	Site/stadium	Score	Win	Loss	Save	Attendance	Overall record	Regional record
May 16	vs. Coastal Carolina		Duke Softball Stadium; Durham, NC	6–3	**Backes** (15–9)	Picone (28–10)	—	—	32–20	1–0
May 17	at No. 21 Duke		Duke Softball Stadium	8–2	**Roelling** (10–8)	Drogemuller (17–9)	—	—	33–20	2–0
May 18	at No. 21 Duke		Duke Softball Stadium	1–8	Curd (15–7)	**Backes** (14–10)	—	—	33–21	2–1
May 18	at No. 21 Duke		Duke Softball Stadium	5–2^{8}	**Roelling** (11–8)	Curd (15–8)	—	1,079	34–21	3–1

Gainesville Super Regional (1–2)
Date	Opponent	Rank	Site/stadium	Score	Win	Loss	Save	Attendance	Overall record	Super Reg. record
May 23	at No. 8 Florida		Katie Seashole Pressly Stadium; Gainesville, FL	1–6	Rothrock (15–5)	**Roelling (11–9)**	—	1,980	34–22	0–1
May 24	at No. 8 Florida		Katie Seashole Pressly Stadium	2–1	**Backes (16–10)**	Rothrock (15–6)	**Roelling** (4)	2,658	35–22	1–1
May 25	at No. 8 Florida		Katie Seashole Pressly Stadium	2–5	Rothrock (16–6)	**Backes (16–11)**	–	2,146	35–23	1–2

- Win
- Loss
- Postponement
- Bold: Bulldogs team member
- Rankings from NFCA:
- (#) Tournament seedings in parentheses.

== Record vs. conference opponents ==
. Blank are not scheduled. Blue are home games, otherwise away.

2025 SEC softball records Source: 2025 SEC softball game results, 2025 SEC softball schedule
Tm	W–L	ALA	ARK	AUB	FLA	UGA	KEN	LSU	MSU	MIZ	OKL	OMS	SCA	TEN	TEX	TAM	Tm	SR	SW
ALA	12–12		.	.	1–2	2–1	.	1–2	1–2	3–0	2–1	.	1–2	.	.	1–2	ALA	3–5	1–0
ARK	14–10	.		.	2–1	.	3–0	2–1	.	.	0–3	1–2	2–1	2–1	.	2–1	ARK	6–2	1–1
AUB	6–18	.	.		0–3	2–1	2–1	.	0–3	.	.	.	2–1	0–3	0–3	0–3	AUB	3–5	0–5
FLA	14–10	2–1	1–2	3–0		.	.	1–2	.	.	2–1	2–1	.	.	1–2	2–1	FLA	5–3	1–0
UGA	7–16	1–2	.	1–2	.		.	1–2	.	1–2	.	1–2	1–2	1–2	.	0–2	UGA	0–8	0–0
KEN	7–17	.	0–3	1–2	.	.		0–3	1–2	3–0	.	2–1	0–3	.	0–3	.	KEN	2–6	1–4
LSU	12–12	2–1	1–2	.	2–1	2–1	3–0		.	.	.	.	1–2	.	1–2	0–3	LSU	4–4	1–1
MSU	13–11	2–1	.	3–0	.	.	2–1	.		2–1	0–3	2–1	.	1–2	1–2	.	MSU	5–3	1–1
MIZ	6–18	0–3	.	.	.	2–1	0–3	.	1–2		1–2	1–2	.	.	0–3	1–2	MIZ	1–7	0–3
OKL	17–7	1–2	3–0	.	1–2	.	.	.	3–0	2–1		.	3–0	1–2	3–0	.	OKL	5–3	4–0
OMS	11–13	.	2–1	.	1–2	2–1	1–2	.	1–2	2–1	.		1–2	1–2	.	.	OMS	3–5	0–0
SCA	13–11	2–1	1–2	1–2	.	2–1	3–0	2–1	.	.	0–3	2–1		.	.	.	SCA	5–3	1–1
TEN	15–9	.	1–2	3–0	.	2–1	.	.	2–1	.	2–1	2–1	.		2–1	1–2	TEN	6–2	1–0
TEX	16–8	.	.	3–0	2–1	.	3–0	2–1	2–1	3–0	0–3	.	.	1–2		.	TEX	6–2	3–1
TAM	16–7	2–1	1–2	3–0	1–2	2–0	.	3–0	.	2–1	.	.	.	2–1	.		TAM	6–2	2–0
Tm	W–L	ALA	ARK	AUB	FLA	UGA	KEN	LSU	MSU	MIZ	OKL	OMS	SCA	TEN	TEX	TAM	Team	SR	SW

Updated for entire regular season. One game TAM @ UGA cancelled.
Tie breakers: ARK>FLA hd to hd, SCA>MSU KEN common, LSU>ALA hd to hd, MIZ>AUB TAM common.

== Rankings ==
Ranking movements Legend: ██ Increase in ranking ██ Decrease in ranking — = Not ranked т = Tied with team above or below
	Week															
Poll	Pre	1	2	3	4	5	6	7	8	9	10	11	12	13	14	Final
NFCA / USA Today	12	10	9	10	13	13	13	15	16	18	23	24	—	—	—	22
Softball America	17	14	11	12	15	17	19	20	23	—	—	—	—	—	—	16
ESPN.com/USA Softball	14	11	9	11	14	13	15	17	16	20	23	24	24т	—	—	17
D1Softball	15	12	12	14	16	16	19	19	25	—	—	—	—	—	—	16
