= 2025 Texas Longhorns softball team =

2025 Texas Longhorns softball

National Champions

NCAA Austin Super Regional champions NCAA Austin Regional champions
- Conference: Southeastern Conference

Ranking
- Coaches: No. 1
- Record: 56–12 (16–8 SEC)
- Head coach: Mike White (7th season)
- Assistant coaches: Steve Singleton (6th season); Kristen Zaleski (3rd season); Patti Ruth Taylor (2nd season)
- Home stadium: Red and Charline McCombs Field

2025 Southeastern Conference softball standings
	Conf.						Overall
Team	W		L		T	PCT	W		L		T	PCT
No. 3 Oklahoma ‍†‍‡‍^{y}	17	–	7	–	0	.708	52	–	9	–	0	.852
No. 14 Texas A&M ‍‍‡‍^{y}	16	–	7	–	0	.696	48	–	11	–	0	.814
No. 1 Texas ‍‍‍^{y}	16	–	8	–	0	.667	56	–	12	–	0	.824
No. 4 Tennessee ‍‍‍^{y}	15	–	9	–	0	.625	47	–	17	–	1	.731
No. 9 Arkansas ‍‍‍^{y}	14	–	10	–	0	.583	44	–	14	–	0	.759
No. 7 Florida ‍‍‍^{y}	14	–	10	–	0	.583	48	–	17	–	0	.738
No. 12 South Carolina ‍‍‍^{y}	13	–	11	–	0	.542	44	–	16	–	0	.733
No. 21 Mississippi State ‍‍‍^{y}	13	–	11	–	0	.542	39	–	19	–	0	.672
No. 19 LSU ‍‍‍^{y}	12	–	12	–	0	.500	42	–	16	–	0	.724
No. 15 Alabama ‍‍‍^{y}	12	–	12	–	0	.500	40	–	23	–	0	.635
No. 8 Ole Miss ‍‍‍^{y}	11	–	13	–	0	.458	42	–	21	–	0	.667
No. 22 Georgia ‍‍‍^{y}	7	–	16	–	0	.304	35	–	23	–	0	.603
Kentucky ‍‍‍^{y}	7	–	17	–	0	.292	31	–	28	–	0	.525
Auburn ‍‍‍^{y}	6	–	18	–	0	.250	34	–	23	–	0	.596
Missouri ‍‍‍	6	–	18	–	0	.250	25	–	31	–	0	.446
† – Conference champion ‡ – Tournament champion y – Invited to the NCAA tournament As of June 6, 2025; Rankings from NFCA/GoRout

The 2025 Texas Longhorns softball team represented the University of Texas at Austin during the 2025 NCAA Division I softball season. The Longhorns played their home games at Red and Charline McCombs Field as a first-year member of the Southeastern Conference. They were led by head coach Mike White in his seventh season at Texas. The Longhorns won the 2025 Women's College World Series for their first national championship in program history.

== Previous season ==
Texas finished the 2024 season 55–10, 23–4 in Big 12 Conference play. In the postseason, Texas made the Women's College World Series and were defeated by Oklahoma in the championship game.

== Personnel ==
=== Roster ===
2025 Texas Longhorns Roster
Pitchers: 17 – Teagan Kavan – sophomore; 25 – Cambria Salmon – freshman; 55 – Mac Morgan – senior; 77 – Citlaly Gutierrez – junior; 99 – Sophia Simpson – senior	Catchers: 14 – Reese Atwood (Note: Plays two different positions) – junior; 20 – Katie Stewart – sophomore; 44 – Katie Cimusz – senior; Infielders: 5 – Kaydee Bennett – junior; 9 – Joley Mitchell – senior; 11 – Shylien Brister – freshman; 12 – Victoria Hunter – sophomore; 14 – Reese Atwood – junior; 20 – Katie Stewart – sophomore; 23 – Viviana Martinez – junior; 44 – Katie Cimusz – senior	Outfielders: 4 – Adayah Wallace – sophomore; 7 – Ashton Maloney - (redshirt) junior; 21 – Kayden Henry – sophomore; Utility Players: 3 – Vanessa Quiroga – senior; 10 – Mia Scott – senior; 30 – Rachel Wells – junior; 43 – Leighann Goode – junior

Roster Notes

=== Coaches ===
2025 Texas Longhorns coaching staff
- Mike White – Head coach – 7th year
- Steve Singleton – Associate head coach – 6th year
- Kristen Zaleski – Assistant coach – 3rd year
- Patti Ruth Taylor – Assistant coach – 2nd year

=== Support staff ===
2025 Texas Longhorns support staff
- Keely McMillon – Director of operations – 5th year
- Melissa Schmitz – Assistant coach for athletic performance – 9th year
- Nick Williams – Video coordinator
- Raiza Aguilar – Associate athletic trainer (Softball) – 2nd year

== Offseason ==
=== Player departures ===
2025 Texas offseason departures
Name	Number	Pos.	Height	Year	Hometown	Notes
Alyssa Washington	11	IF	5'5"	Senior	Abilene, TX	Graduated
Baylea Brandon	27	UTL	5'6"	Junior	Leander, TX	Graduated
Bella Dayton	6	OF	5'6"	Senior	Wylie, TX	Graduated
Estelle Czech	22	P	5'8"	Senior	Downers Grove, IL	Graduated
Jordyn Whitaker	5	DP	5'9"	Senior	Jacksonville, TX	Graduated

Outgoing transfers

Name	B/T	Pos.	Height	Hometown	Year	New school	Source
Ryan Brown	R/R	IF	5’8”	Thompson's Station, TN	Freshman	Tennessee	

=== Incoming players ===
2024 Texas Signing Class
Name	B/T	Number	Pos.	Hometown	High School	Source
Shylien Brister	R/R	11	UTL	Houston, TX	Clear Brook High School	
Cambria Salmon	R/R	25	P	Beaumont, CA	Beaumont High School	

Incoming transfers

Name	B/T	Pos.	Height	Hometown	Year	Previous school	Source
Kaydee Bennett	L/R	IF	5'6”	Caddo Mills, TX	Junior	Abilene Christian	

== Preseason ==
=== Preseason All-SEC team ===
Preseason All-SEC Team
Name	Number	Position	Class	Source
Citlaly Gutierrez	77	P	Junior	
Katie Stewart	20	IF/C	Sophomore	
Mia Scott	10	UTL	Senior	
Reese Atwood	14	IF/C	Junior	
Teagan Kavan	17	P	Sophomore	

=== SEC coaches poll ===
SEC coaches poll
Predicted finish	Team	Votes (1st place)
1	Texas	186 (7)
2	Florida	181 (6)
3	Oklahoma	170 (2)
4	Tennessee	158
5	Texas A&M	153
6	LSU	115
7	Arkansas	104
8	Georgia	103
9	Missouri	100
10	Alabama	97
11	Kentucky	55
12	Mississippi State	54
13	Auburn	37
14	Ole Miss	34
15	South Carolina	28

== Schedule and results ==
2025 Texas Longhorns softball game log (56–12)
Legend: = Win = Loss = Tie = Canceled Bold = Texas team member
Regular season (45–9)

February (17–1)
Date	Time (CT)	TV	Opponent	Rank	Stadium	Score	Win	Loss	Save	Attendance	Overall record	SEC Record	Box Score	Recap
Louisiana Classic
February 7	3:30 p.m.	N/A	vs. Longwood	#1	Yvette Girouard Field at Lamson Park • Lafayette, LA	8–0 ^{(5)}	**Morgan** (1–0)	Kirkland (1–1)	—	506	1–0	—	Box Score	Recap
February 7	6:00 p.m.	ESPN+	at Louisiana	#1	Yvette Girouard Field at Lamson Park • Lafayette, LA	8–0 ^{(5)}	**Kavan** (1–0)	Noble (0–1)	—	2,511	2–0	—	Box Score	Recap
UH/LU Classic
February 8	12:00 p.m.	N/A	vs. St. Johns	#1	Lamar Softball Complex • Beaumont, TX	5–0	**Salmon** (1–0)	Serafinko (0–1)	—	491	3–0	—	Box Score	Recap
February 8	6:00 p.m.	N/A	at Lamar	#1	Lamar Softball Complex • Beaumont, TX	13–7	**Gutierrez** (1–0)	Guidry (0–1)	—	1,273	4–0	—	Box Score	Recap
Bearkat Classic
February 9	11:30 a.m.	N/A	vs. Tulsa	#1	Bearkat Softball Complex • Huntsville, TX	4–2	**Salmon** (2–0)	Maples (1–1)	**Gutierrez** (1)	633	5–0	—	Box Score	Recap
February 9	2:00 p.m.	ESPN+	at Sam Houston	#1	Bearkat Softball Complex • Huntsville, TX	8–3	**Kavan** (2–0)	Daniel (1–1)	—	752	6–0	—	Box Score	Recap
Bevo Classic
February 14	4:00 p.m.	SECN+	vs. Maryland	#1	Red and Charline McCombs Field • Austin, TX	13–4 ^{(5)}	**Salmon** (3–0)	Shearer (1–2)	—	536	7–0	—	Box Score	Recap
February 14	6:30 p.m.	SECN+	vs. #11 Texas Tech	#1	Red and Charline McCombs Field • Austin, TX	2–1 ^{(9)}	**Kavan** (3–0)	Canady (3–2)	—	892	8–0	—	Box Score	Recap
February 15	4:00 p.m.	SECN+	vs. UMass	#1	Red and Charline McCombs Field • Austin, TX	6–0	**Gutierrez** (2–0)	Horton (1–4)	**Salmon** (1)	1,094	9–0	—	Box Score	Recap
February 15	6:30 p.m.	SECN+	vs. Maryland	#1	Red and Charline McCombs Field • Austin, TX	8–3	**Morgan** (2–0)	Wurst (2–2)	**Gutierrez** (2)	1,213	10–0	—	Box Score	Recap
February 16	12:30 p.m.	SECN+	vs. #11 Texas Tech	#1	Red and Charline McCombs Field • Austin, TX	11–0 ^{(5)}	**Kavan** (4–0)	Lincoln (2–1)	—	1,238	11–0	—	Box Score	Recap
February 19	6:00 p.m.	SECN+	vs. Akron	#1	Red and Charline McCombs Field • Austin, TX	Cancelled due to inclement weather.								
Hillenbrand Invitational
February 21	1:00 p.m.	FloSoftball	vs. #18 Stanford	#1	Hillenbrand Stadium • Tucson, AZ	5–9	Houston (3–0)	**Kavan** (4–1)	—	N/A	11–1	—	Box Score	Recap
February 21	3:30 p.m.	FloSoftball	vs. Colorado State	#1	Hillenbrand Stadium • Tucson, AZ	18–2 ^{(5)}	**Morgan** (3–0)	Bentley (1–5)	—	N/A	12–1	—	Box Score	Recap
February 22	11:00 a.m.	FloSoftball	vs. UC Davis	#1	Hillenbrand Stadium • Tucson, AZ	12–0 ^{(5)}	**Salmon** (4–0)	Grimes (2–5)	—	N/A	13–1	—	Box Score	Recap
February 22	4:00 p.m.	ESPN+	at #13 Arizona	#1	Hillenbrand Stadium • Tucson, AZ	8–4 ^{(8)}	**Gutierrez** (3–0)	Swain (2–1)	—	2,976	14–1	—	Box Score	Recap
February 23	10:00 a.m.	FloSoftball	vs. Colorado State	#1	Hillenbrand Stadium • Tucson, AZ	10–2 ^{(5)}	**Gutierrez** (4–0)	Cooledge (0–2)	—	N/A	15–1	—	Box Score	Recap
Longhorn Invitational
February 28	4:00 p.m.	SECN+	vs. South Florida	#1	Red and Charline McCombs Field • Austin, TX	9–5	**Gutierrez** (5–0)	Dixon (6–2)	—	1,257	16–1	—	Box Score	Recap
February 28	6:30 p.m.	SECN+	vs. Abilene Christian	#1	Red and Charline McCombs Field • Austin, TX	9–1 ^{(6)}	**Salmon** (5–0)	Russo (1–7)	—	1,347	17–1	—	Box Score	Recap

March (17–2)
Date	Time (CT)	TV	Opponent	Rank	Stadium	Score	Win	Loss	Save	Attendance	Overall record	SEC Record	Box Score	Recap
March 1	1:30 p.m.	SECN+	vs. New Mexico State	#1	Red and Charline McCombs Field • Austin, TX	5–2	**Kavan** (5–1)	Mancha (1–1)	—	1,353	18–1	—	Box Score	Recap
March 2	12:30 p.m.	SECN+	vs. South Florida	#1	Red and Charline McCombs Field • Austin, TX	9–1 ^{(5)}	**Kavan** (6–1)	Dixon (7–3)	—	1,458	19–1	—	Box Score	Recap
March 2	3:00 p.m.	SECN+	vs. Alabama A&M	#1	Red and Charline McCombs Field • Austin, TX	8–0 ^{(5)}	**Morgan** (4–0)	Charter-Smith (3–3)	—	1,198	20–1	—	Box Score	Recap
March 5	6:00 p.m.	SECN+	vs. Baylor	#1	Red and Charline McCombs Field • Austin, TX	4–0	**Kavan** (7–1)	Ross (2–4)	—	1,014	21–1	—	Box Score	Recap
Ohio State Tournament
March 8	9:45 a.m.	N/A	vs. Merrimack	#1	Buckeye Field • Columbus, OH	10–1 ^{(5)}	**Morgan** (5–0)	Imbimbo (0–5)	—	321	22–1	—	Box Score	Recap
March 8	2:00 p.m.	N/A	vs. Oakland	#1	Buckeye Field • Columbus, OH	13–0 ^{(5)}	**Gutierrez** (6–0)	Balcom (3–4)	—	377	23–1	—	Box Score	Recap
March 9	4:30 p.m.	N/A	vs. Kent State	#1	Buckeye Field • Columbus, OH	15–1 ^{(5)}	**Kavan** (8–1)	Johnson (3–3)	—	514	24–1	—	Box Score	Recap
March 10	11:30 a.m.	N/A	vs. Dayton	#1	Buckeye Field • Columbus, OH	6–1	**Salmon** (6–0)	Kemp (4–2)	—	277	25–1	—	Box Score	Recap
March 10	3:00 p.m.	BTN	at Ohio State	#1	Buckeye Field • Columbus, OH	4–2	**Kavan** (9–1)	Boutte (9–3)	**Gutierrez** (3)	1,378	26–1	—	Box Score	Recap
March 15	1:00 p.m.	SECN	at #3 Florida	#1	Katie Seashole Pressly Softball Stadium • Gainesville, FL	7–2	**Kavan** (10–1)	Oxley (3–2)	**Morgan** (1)	2,499	27–1	1–0	Box Score	Recap
March 15	4:00 p.m.	SECN+	at #3 Florida	#1	Katie Seashole Pressly Softball Stadium • Gainesville, FL	13–7	**Kavan** (11–1)	Hammock (7–1)	—	2,150	28–1	2–0	Box Score	Recap
March 17	6:00 p.m.	SECN	at #3 Florida	#1	Katie Seashole Pressly Softball Stadium • Gainesville, FL	1–3	Oxley (4–2)	**Morgan** (5–1)	Brown (2)	2,108	28–2	2–1	Box Score	Recap
March 21	4:00 p.m.	SECN+	vs. #23 Auburn	#2	Red and Charline McCombs Field • Austin, TX	12–2 ^{(5)}	**Kavan** (12–1)	Rainey (3–2)	—	1,292	29–2	3–1	Box Score	Recap
March 22	2:00 p.m.	SECN+	vs. #23 Auburn	#2	Red and Charline McCombs Field • Austin, TX	7–5	**Kavan** (13–1)	Geurin (14–4)	—	1,387	30–2	4–1	Box Score	Recap
March 23	12:00 p.m.	SECN+	vs. #23 Auburn	#2	Red and Charline McCombs Field • Austin, TX	13–2 ^{(5)}	**Kavan** (14–1)	Geurin (14–5)	—	1,400	31–2	5–1	Box Score	Recap
March 25	6:00 p.m.	SECN+	vs. Stephen F. Austin	#1	Red and Charline McCombs Field • Austin, TX	11–3 ^{(5)}	**Morgan** (6–1)	Telford (4–3)	—	826	32–2	—	Box Score	Recap
March 28	6:00 p.m.	SECN+	at #18 Mississippi State	#1	Nusz Park • Starkville, MS	3–4	Chaffin (16–2)	**Kavan** (14–2)	—	1,285	32–3	5–2	Box Score	Recap
March 29	2:00 p.m.	SECN+	at #18 Mississippi State	#1	Nusz Park • Starkville, MS	7–3	**Gutierrez** (7–0)	Chaffin (16–3)	**Kavan** (1)	1,285	33–3	6–2	Box Score	Recap
March 30	1:00 p.m.	SECN+	at #18 Mississippi State	#1	Nusz Park • Starkville, MS	7–2	**Kavan** (15–2)	Chaffin (16–4)	—	1,282	34–3	7–2	Box Score	Recap

April (8–6)
Date	Time (CT)	TV	Opponent	Rank	Stadium	Score	Win	Loss	Save	Attendance	Overall record	SEC Record	Box Score	Recap
April 5	5:00 p.m.	SECN	at Missouri	#1	Mizzou Softball Stadium • Columbia, MO	8–0 ^{(5)}	**Kavan** (16–2)	McCann (7–8)	—	2,515	35–3	8–2	Box Score	Recap
April 6	12:00 p.m.	ESPN2	at Missouri	#1	Mizzou Softball Stadium • Columbia, MO	4–3	**Gutierrez** (8–0)	Harrison (9–6)	**Kavan** (2)	2,523	36–3	9–2	Box Score	Recap
April 6	3:00 p.m.	SECN+	at Missouri	#1	Mizzou Softball Stadium • Columbia, MO	3–1 ^{(8)}	**Kavan** (17–2)	Pannell (4–5)	—	2,523	37–3	10–2	Box Score	Recap
April 9	6:00 p.m.	SECN	vs. Texas State	#1	Red and Charline McCombs Field • Austin, TX	10–1 ^{(5)}	**Morgan** (7–1)	Madison (15–5)	—	1,277	38–3	—	Box Score	Recap
April 11	8:00 p.m.	ESPNU	vs. #7 Tennessee	#1	Red and Charline McCombs Field • Austin, TX	3–0	**Kavan** (18–2)	Nuwer (5–3)	—	1,590	39–3	11–2	Box Score	Recap
April 12	5:00 p.m.	ESPN	vs. #7 Tennessee	#1	Red and Charline McCombs Field • Austin, TX	1–3	Pickens (16–4)	**Morgan** (7–2)	—	1,554	39–4	11–3	Box Score	Recap
April 13	12:00 p.m.	SECN+	vs. #7 Tennessee	#1	Red and Charline McCombs Field • Austin, TX	1–4	Pickens (17–4)	**Kavan** (18–3)	—	1,471	39–5	11–4	Box Score	Recap
April 17	4:30 p.m.	SECN+	vs. #9 LSU	#3	Red and Charline McCombs Field • Austin, TX	7–3	**Kavan** (19–3)	Berzon (15–4)	—	1,231	40–5	12–4	Box Score	Recap
April 18	4:30 p.m.	SECN+	vs. #9 LSU	#3	Red and Charline McCombs Field • Austin, TX	1–6	Clopton (6–1)	**Morgan** (7–3)	Berzon (2)	1,680	40–6	12–5	Box Score	Recap
April 19	11:00 a.m.	ESPN2	vs. #9 LSU	#3	Red and Charline McCombs Field • Austin, TX	6–5	**Kavan** (20–3)	Berzon (15–5)	—	1,593	41–6	13–5	Box Score	Recap
April 23	7:00 p.m.	ESPNU	at #23 Oklahoma State	#2	Cowgirl Stadium • Stillwater, OK	1–0	**Gutierrez** (9–0)	Crandall (3–4)	**Kavan** (3)	2,012	42–6	—	Box Score	Recap
April 25	5:00 p.m.	ESPNU	at #3 Oklahoma	#2	Love's Field • Norman, OK	6–7	Landry (16–3)	**Kavan** (20–4)	—	4,587	42–7	13–6	Box Score	Recap
April 26	11:00 a.m.	ESPN2	at #3 Oklahoma	#2	Love's Field • Norman, OK	2–7	Deal (9–1)	**Gutierrez** (9–1)	—	4,538	42–8	13–7	Box Score	Recap
April 27	1:00 p.m.	ESPN2	at #3 Oklahoma	#2	Love's Field • Norman, OK	8–9	Landry (17–3)	**Salmon** (6–1)	—	4,609	42–9	13–8	Box Score	Recap

May (3–0)
Date	Time (CT)	TV	Opponent	Rank	Stadium	Score	Win	Loss	Save	Attendance	Overall record	SEC	Box Score	Recap
May 1	6:00 p.m.	SECN+	vs. Kentucky	#4	Red and Charline McCombs Field • Austin, TX	9–1 ^{(5)}	**Kavan** (21–4)	Fall (6–5)	—	890	43–9	14–8	Box Score	Recap
May 2	11:00 a.m.	SECN+	vs. Kentucky	#4	Red and Charline McCombs Field • Austin, TX	7–6	**Morgan** (8–3)	Langdon (3–7)	—	650	44–9	15–8	Box Score	Recap
May 3	1:00 p.m.	SECN	vs. Kentucky	#4	Red and Charline McCombs Field • Austin, TX	12–3 ^{(5)}	**Morgan** (9–3)	Fall (6–6)	—	1,355	45–9	16–8	Box Score	Recap

Postseason (11–3)

SEC Softball Tournament (1–1)
Date	Time (CT)	TV	Opponent	Seed	Stadium	Score	Win	Loss	Save	Attendance	Overall record	Tournament record	Box Score	Recap
May 8	4:00 p.m.	SECN	vs. #18 (11) Ole Miss	#3 (3)	Jack Turner Stadium • Athens, GA	7–6	**Gutierrez** (10–1)	Lopez (11–4)	—	1,958	46–9	1–0	Box Score	Recap
May 9	5:40 p.m.	SECN	vs. #1 (2) Texas A&M; Lone Star Showdown	#3 (3)	Jack Turner Stadium • Athens, GA	2–14 ^{(5)}	Kennedy (21–4)	**Morgan** (9–4)	—	1,898	46–10	1–1	Box Score	Recap

NCAA Austin Regional (3–0)
Date	Time (CT)	TV	Opponent	Seed	Stadium	Score	Win	Loss	Save	Attendance	Overall record	Regional record	Box Score	Recap
May 16	3:30 p.m.	ESPN+	vs. (4) Eastern Illinois	#3 (1)	Red and Charline McCombs Field • Austin, TX	10–2 ^{(5)}	**Salmon** (7–1)	Oslanzi (20–14)	—	1,053	47–10	1–0	Box Score	Recap
May 17	12:00 p.m.	ESPN	vs. (3) Michigan	#3 (1)	Red and Charline McCombs Field • Austin, TX	16–4 ^{(5)}	**Kavan** (22–4)	Derkowski (17–12)	—	1,223	48–10	2–0	Box Score	Recap
May 18	12:00 p.m.	ESPN	vs. (2) UCF; Regional Final	#3 (1)	Red and Charline McCombs Field • Austin, TX	9–0	**Kavan** (23–4)	Vega (14–7)	—	1,040	49–10	3–0	Box Score	Recap

NCAA Austin Super Regional (2–1)
Date	Time (CT)	TV	Opponent	Seed	Stadium	Score	Win	Loss	Save	Attendance	Overall record	Super Regional record	Box Score	Recap
May 22	8:00 p.m.	ESPN2	vs. #13 (11) Clemson	#3 (6)	Red and Charline McCombs Field • Austin, TX	4–7	Basinger (18–5)	**Kavan** (23–5)	McCubbin (5)	1,546	49–11	0–1	Box Score	Recap
May 23	8:00 p.m.	ESPN2	vs. #13 (11) Clemson	#3 (6)	Red and Charline McCombs Field • Austin, TX	7–5 ^{(10)}	**Kavan** (24–5)	McCubbin (18–6)	—	1,722	50–11	1–1	Box Score	Recap
May 24	8:00 p.m.	ESPN	vs. #13 (11) Clemson	#3 (6)	Red and Charline McCombs Field • Austin, TX	6–5	**Morgan** (10–4)	Basinger (18–6)	—	1,729	51–11	2–1	Box Score	Recap

Women's College World Series (5–1)
Date	Time (CT)	TV	Opponent	Seed	Stadium	Score	Win	Loss	Save	Attendance	Overall record	WCWS record	Box Score	Recap
May 29	11:00 a.m.	ESPN	vs. #8 (3) Florida	#3 (6)	Devon Park • Oklahoma City, OK	3–0	**Kavan** (25–5)	Rothrock (16–7)	—	11,805	52–11	1–0	Box Score	Recap
May 31	2:00 p.m.	ABC	vs. #2 (2) Oklahoma	#3 (6)	Devon Park • Oklahoma City, OK	4–2	**Kavan** (26–5)	Landry (24–5)	—	12,595	53–11	2–0	Box Score	Recap
June 2	11:00 a.m.	ESPN	vs. #7 (7) Tennessee	#3 (6)	Devon Park • Oklahoma City, OK	2–0	**Morgan** (11–4)	Pickens (25–11)	**Kavan** (4)	10,976	54–11	3–0	Box Score	Recap
June 4	7:00 p.m.	ESPN	vs. #10 (12) Texas Tech; Championship Series	#3 (6)	Devon Park • Oklahoma City, OK	2–1	**Kavan** (27–5)	Canady (33–6)	—	12,109	55–11	4–0	Box Score	Recap
June 5	7:00 p.m.	ESPN	vs. #10 (12) Texas Tech; Championship Series	#3 (6)	Devon Park • Oklahoma City, OK	3–4	Canady (34–6)	**Salmon** (7–2)	—	12,220	55–12	4–1	Box Score	Recap
June 6	7:00 p.m.	ESPN	vs. #10 (12) Texas Tech; Championship Series	#3 (6)	Devon Park • Oklahoma City, OK	10–4	**Kavan** (28–5)	Canady (34–7)	—	12,269	56–12	5–1	Box Score	Recap

Schedule Notes

== Awards and honors ==
=== National awards and honors ===
National Weekly honors
Honors	Player	Position	Date Awarded	Ref.
NFCA Player of the Week	Reese Atwood	C	March 11, 2025	
NFCA National Pitcher of the Week	Teagan Kavan	P	March 18, 2025	

=== SEC awards and honors ===
SEC Weekly honors
Honors	Player	Position	Date Awarded	Ref.
SEC Pitcher of the Week	Teagan Kavan	P	February 17, 2025	
SEC Pitcher of the Week	Teagan Kavan	P	March 11, 2025	

== Record vs. conference opponents ==
. Blank are not scheduled. Blue are home games, otherwise away.

2025 SEC softball records Source: 2025 SEC softball game results, 2025 SEC softball schedule
Tm	W–L	ALA	ARK	AUB	FLA	UGA	KEN	LSU	MSU	MIZ	OKL	OMS	SCA	TEN	TEX	TAM	Tm	SR	SW
ALA	12–12		.	.	1–2	2–1	.	1–2	1–2	3–0	2–1	.	1–2	.	.	1–2	ALA	3–5	1–0
ARK	14–10	.		.	2–1	.	3–0	2–1	.	.	0–3	1–2	2–1	2–1	.	2–1	ARK	6–2	1–1
AUB	6–18	.	.		0–3	2–1	2–1	.	0–3	.	.	.	2–1	0–3	0–3	0–3	AUB	3–5	0–5
FLA	14–10	2–1	1–2	3–0		.	.	1–2	.	.	2–1	2–1	.	.	1–2	2–1	FLA	5–3	1–0
UGA	7–16	1–2	.	1–2	.		.	1–2	.	1–2	.	1–2	1–2	1–2	.	0–2	UGA	0–8	0–0
KEN	7–17	.	0–3	1–2	.	.		0–3	1–2	3–0	.	2–1	0–3	.	0–3	.	KEN	2–6	1–4
LSU	12–12	2–1	1–2	.	2–1	2–1	3–0		.	.	.	.	1–2	.	1–2	0–3	LSU	4–4	1–1
MSU	13–11	2–1	.	3–0	.	.	2–1	.		2–1	0–3	2–1	.	1–2	1–2	.	MSU	5–3	1–1
MIZ	6–18	0–3	.	.	.	2–1	0–3	.	1–2		1–2	1–2	.	.	0–3	1–2	MIZ	1–7	0–3
OKL	17–7	1–2	3–0	.	1–2	.	.	.	3–0	2–1		.	3–0	1–2	3–0	.	OKL	5–3	4–0
OMS	11–13	.	2–1	.	1–2	2–1	1–2	.	1–2	2–1	.		1–2	1–2	.	.	OMS	3–5	0–0
SCA	13–11	2–1	1–2	1–2	.	2–1	3–0	2–1	.	.	0–3	2–1		.	.	.	SCA	5–3	1–1
TEN	15–9	.	1–2	3–0	.	2–1	.	.	2–1	.	2–1	2–1	.		2–1	1–2	TEN	6–2	1–0
TEX	16–8	.	.	3–0	2–1	.	3–0	2–1	2–1	3–0	0–3	.	.	1–2		.	TEX	6–2	3–1
TAM	16–7	2–1	1–2	3–0	1–2	2–0	.	3–0	.	2–1	.	.	.	2–1	.		TAM	6–2	2–0
Tm	W–L	ALA	ARK	AUB	FLA	UGA	KEN	LSU	MSU	MIZ	OKL	OMS	SCA	TEN	TEX	TAM	Team	SR	SW

Updated for entire regular season. One game TAM @ UGA cancelled.
Tie breakers: ARK>FLA hd to hd, SCA>MSU KEN common, LSU>ALA hd to hd, MIZ>AUB TAM common.

== Rankings ==
Ranking movements Legend: ██ Increase in ranking ██ Decrease in ranking
	Week																
Poll	Pre	1	2	3	4	5	6	7	8	9	10	11	12	13	14	15	Final
NFCA / USA Today	1	1	1	1	1	2	2	1	1	1	3	2	4	3	3	3	1
Softball America	2	2	1	1	1	1	1	1	1	1	3	3	7	6	6	6	1
ESPN.com/USA Softball	1	1	1	2	2	2	2	1	1	1	3	3	5	5	4	4	1
D1Softball	2	2	1	2	2	2	2	1	1	1	2	1	6	6	6	6	1
