= Bogle Park =

Softball stadium located in Fayetteville, Arkansas, United States

- Interactive map of Bogle Park
- Location: Fayetteville, Arkansas
- Coordinates: 36°03′33.2″N 94°10′35.8″W
- Owner: University of Arkansas
- Operator: University of Arkansas
- Capacity: 3,200
- Record attendance: 3,938 (May 4, 2024 vs Ole Miss)

Construction
- Built: 2007
- Opened: 2007
- Architect: Browning Day Mullins Dierdorf
- Structural engineer: Engineering Consultants

Tenant
- Arkansas Razorbacks softball (NCAA) (2008–present)

Bogle Park is a softball stadium located in Fayetteville, Arkansas. It is the home of the Arkansas Razorbacks softball team. The stadium was built in 2007, replacing Lady'Back Field, and opened in time for the 2008 season. It is named for Bob and Marilyn Bogle. The stadium's seating capacity is 3,200, though additional seating is available behind the outfield.

== Attendance ==
The top ten attendance figures in Bogle Park's history are listed below.

Rank	Date	Opponent	Attendance
1	May 4, 2024	Ole Miss	3,938
2	April 20, 2024	Alabama	3,900
3	April 6, 2024	Missouri	3,885
4	April 19, 2024	Alabama	3,839
5	April 21, 2024	Alabama	3,832
6	March 23, 2024	Mississippi State	3,811
7	May 2, 2025	LSU	3,689
8	May 3, 2024	Ole Miss (DH)	3,592
9	March 29, 2025	Kentucky	3,554
10	February 24, 2024	Illinois State/Wichita State (tournament)	3,549
^{†}NCAA Regional Game • ^{††}NCAA Super Regional Game • Source
