= Ole Miss Rebels softball =

Ole Miss Rebels
- 2025 Ole Miss Rebels softball team
- University: University of Mississippi
- Athletic director: Keith Carter
- Head coach: Jamie Trachsel (6th season)
- Conference: SEC
- Location: Oxford, Mississippi, US
- Home stadium: Alisa and Mark Bourne Stadium (capacity: 1,677)
- Nickname: Rebels
- Colors: Cardinal red and navy blue

NCAA WCWS appearances
- 2025

NCAA super regional appearances
- 2017, 2019, 2025

NCAA Tournament appearances
- 2016, 2017, 2018, 2019, 2021, 2022, 2023, 2024, 2025, 2026

Conference tournament championships
- 2017

The Ole Miss Rebels softball is the team represents the University of Mississippi in college softball at the NCAA Division I level. The Rebels are currently coached by Jamie Trachsel, who had in her first year as head coach in 2021 with the team.

== History ==
The Ole Miss Rebels softball program was established in 1997, coinciding with the Southeastern Conference's (SEC) introduction of fast-pitch softball. Under inaugural head coach Joyce Maudie, the team concluded its first season with a 22–41 record. In 1998, the Rebels began playing at the Ole Miss Softball Complex, which underwent significant renovations in 2006, including the addition of an indoor hitting facility and upgraded amenities.

Progress was gradual in the early years for them, with the program achieving its first winning season in 2005, finishing 30–28. The arrival of head coach Missy Dickerson in 2006 marked a turning point, as the Rebels earned their first SEC Tournament berth that year and continued to make appearances under her leadership.

A significant milestone occurred in 2017 when Ole Miss, led by pitcher Kaitlin Lee, won its first SEC Tournament title, as they hosted an NCAA Regional for the first time, and advanced to the Super Regionals that season as well.

The program's trajectory continued upward with the hiring of Jamie Trachsel as head coach in 2020. Under her guidance, the Rebels have made consecutive NCAA Tournament appearances, culminating in the 2025 season, which stands as the most successful in program history. That year, Ole Miss secured its first Super Regional victory by defeating No. 4 Arkansas and advanced to the Women's College World Series (WCWS) for the first time.

The 2025 team set a new program record with 67 home runs in a single season. Freshman Persy Llamas led the team in multi-hit games and set the freshman RBI record, while Aliyah Binford established a new single-season RBI record with 55. Pitcher Miali Guachino recorded 172 strikeouts, the most by a Rebel since 2004.

The coaching staff's impact was further bolstered by the addition of Ehren Earleywine as assistant coach. His previous experience, including leading Missouri to multiple WCWS appearances, contributed to the team's strategic advancements during the historic 2025 season.

== Conference Tournament Championships ==
The Ole Miss Rebels won their first Southeastern Conference (SEC) Tournament championship in 2017. The tournament was held at Sherri Parker Lee Stadium in Knoxville, Tennessee.

Entering as the No. 8 seed, Ole Miss made a historic run through the bracket. The Rebels defeated Mississippi State, top-seeded Florida, and No. 5 Alabama, then clinched the title with a 3–1 victory over No. 11 LSU in the championship game on May 13, 2017.

The team was led by pitcher Kaitlin Lee, who threw five complete games in five days and was named the tournament's Most Valuable Player. Her dominant performance included a shutout against Florida and just one earned run allowed in the title game.

The championship secured Ole Miss an automatic berth to the NCAA Tournament and marked a major milestone in the program's development under head coach Mike Smith.

== NCAA Regional Appearances ==
The Ole Miss Rebels softball program has made nine NCAA Regional appearances between 2016 and 2025, marking a period of significant growth and achievement for the team.

In 2016, the Rebels made their inaugural NCAA Tournament appearance at the Norman Regional hosted by the University of Oklahoma. They secured a 5–1 victory over Tulsa, followed by a 1–9 loss to Oklahoma. Demonstrating resilience, Ole Miss defeated Wichita State 4–0 before being eliminated by Oklahoma with a 0–3 loss. This marked the beginning of the program's presence on the national stage.

The 2017 season was a milestone year, as Ole Miss hosted the Oxford Regional. The Rebels showcased dominant performances, defeating Southern Illinois 8–0, Arizona State 2–0, and North Carolina 7–2 to clinch their first Regional Championship and advance to the Super Regionals for the first time in program history.

In 2018, the team competed in the Tempe Regional hosted by Arizona State. They opened with a commanding 9–1 win over Long Beach State but faced challenges against the host team, resulting in losses of 1–7 and 0–9, concluding their tournament run.

The 2019 Oxford Regional saw Ole Miss once again hosting. After an initial 12–0 win over Chattanooga, the Rebels faced a setback with a 0–2 loss to Louisiana. Demonstrating determination, they rebounded with a 10–0 victory over Southeast Missouri State and consecutive wins over Louisiana (5–1 and 5–4) to secure their second Regional Championship.

In 2021, the Rebels participated in the Tucson Regional hosted by Arizona. They achieved a 5–1 win against Villanova but were twice bested by Arizona with identical 6–12 scores, sandwiching a 6–2 win over Villanova.

The 2022 Los Angeles Regional presented challenges, with an opening 2–4 loss to Loyola Marymount. Ole Miss fought back with a 9–5 win over Grand Canyon and a 4–2 victory in a rematch against Loyola Marymount but were ultimately eliminated by UCLA with a 1–9 loss.

During the 2023 Salt Lake City Regional, the Rebels secured a 3–0 win over Baylor but faced two defeats from Utah (1–7 and 1–4), interspersed with a 9–2 victory in a rematch against Baylor.

The 2024 Lafayette Regional was a tough outing for Ole Miss, as they were eliminated after consecutive losses to Baylor (1–3) and Princeton (2–4).

In 2025, the Rebels achieved a historic milestone at the Tucson Regional hosted by Arizona. They opened with a 7–4 win over Grand Canyon and a thrilling 10–8 victory against Arizona. After a 1–10 loss in a rematch with Arizona, Ole Miss clinched the Regional Championship with a decisive 7–3 win over the Wildcats, advancing to their first-ever Women's College World Series.

NCAA Regional Results
2016 Norman Regional hosted by Oklahoma

Defeated Tulsa, 5–1
Lost to Oklahoma, 1–9
Defeated Wichita State, 4–0
Lost to Oklahoma, 0–3
First appearance in NCAA Tournament

2017 Oxford Regional hosted by Ole Miss

Defeated Southern Illinois, 8–0
Defeated Arizona State, 2–0
Defeated North Carolina, 7–2
Regional Championship

2018 Tempe Regional hosted by Arizona State

Defeated Long Beach State, 9–1
Lost to Arizona State, 1–7
Defeated Long Beach State, 1–0
Lost to Arizona State, 0–9

2019 Oxford Regional hosted by Ole Miss

Defeated Chattanooga, 12–0
Lost to Louisiana, 0–2
Defeated Southeast Missouri State, 10–0
Defeated Louisiana, 5–1
Defeated Louisiana, 5–4
Regional Championship

2021 Tucson Regional hosted by Arizona

Defeated Villanova, 5–1
Lost to Arizona, 6–12
Defeated Villanova, 6–2
Lost to Arizona, 6–12

2022 Los Angeles Regional hosted by UCLA

Lost to Loyola Marymount, 2–4
Defeated Grand Canyon, 9–5
Defeated Loyola Marymount, 4–2
Lost to UCLA, 1–9

2023 Salt Lake City Regional hosted by Utah

Defeated Baylor, 3–0
Lost to Utah, 1–7
Defeated Baylor, 9–2
Lost to Utah, 1–4

2024 Lafayette Regional hosted by Louisiana
Lost to Baylor, 1–3
Lost to Princeton 2–4
2025 Tucson Regional hosted by Arizona
Defeated Grand Canyon, 7–4
Defeated Arizona, 10–8
Lost to Arizona, 1–10
Defeated Arizona, 7–3
Regional Championship

== NCAA Super Regional Appearances ==
The Ole Miss Rebels softball team has reached the NCAA Super Regionals three times: in 2017, 2019, and 2025.

In 2017, after winning the Oxford Regional, Ole Miss advanced to the Los Angeles Super Regional to face No. 5 UCLA. The first game was a dramatic 11-inning contest in which the Rebels took a 5–4 lead in the sixth inning, only for UCLA to tie the game in the seventh. Ole Miss regained the lead in the 10th inning, but UCLA responded again, ultimately winning 8–7 in the 11th inning. The second game was a pitchers' duel, with UCLA edging Ole Miss 1–0 to sweep the series and advance to the Women's College World Series.

In 2019, the Rebels returned to the Super Regionals, this time traveling to Tucson to face No. 6 Arizona. Ole Miss dropped both games, losing 5–2 in the opener and 9–1 in the second game, concluding their postseason run.

In 2025, Ole Miss achieved a historic milestone by advancing to their first-ever Women's College World Series. After winning the Tucson Regional, the Rebels faced No. 4 Arkansas in the Fayetteville Super Regional. Ole Miss won the first game 9–7, lost the second 4–0, and secured their spot in Oklahoma City with a 7–4 victory in the decisive third game.

NCAA Super Regional Results
2017 Los Angeles Super Regional hosted by UCLA

Lost to #5 UCLA, 7–8
Lost to #5 UCLA, 0–1

2019 Tucson Super Regional hosted by Arizona

Lost to #6 Arizona, 2–5
Lost to #6 Arizona, 1–9

2025 Fayetteville Super Regional hosted by Arkansas
Defeated #4 Arkansas, 9–7
Lost to #4 Arkansas, 0–4
Defeated #4 Arkansas 7–4
Advance to the Women's College World Series

== NCAA Women's College World Series Appearances ==
NCAA WCWS Results
2025 Women's College World Series in Oklahoma City
Lost to #12 Texas Tech 0–1
Lost to #16 Oregon 5–6 ^{(10)}

== Ole Miss All-Americans ==
Player	Year(s)	Honors
Jennifer Poore	2001	Easton Third Team All-American
Lauren Grill	2008^{†}, 2010	NFCA First Team All-American (2008), NFCA All-American (2010)
Kylan Becker	2019^{†}	NFCA First Team All-American, Softball America First Team All-American
Aliyah Binford	2025	Softball America Preseason Second Team All-American
Miali Guachino	2025	D1Softball Freshman All-American Second Team
References: "2014 Ole Miss Softball Media Supplement" (PDF). Ole Miss Athletics. Archived from the original (PDF) on 4 March 2016.; "Grill Named To NFCA All-America Team". OleMissSports.com. Ole Miss Athletics. 2 June 2010.; "Becker Becomes Ole Miss' Second-Ever NFCA All-American". OleMissSports.com. Ole Miss Athletics. 29 May 2019.; "Aliyah Binford Tabbed as Softball America Preseason All-American". OleMissSports.com. Ole Miss Athletics. 7 January 2025.; "Miali Guachino Named D1Softball Freshman All-American". OleMissSports.com. Ole Miss Athletics. 29 May 2025.

† Denotes NFCA First Team selection

=== Player Profiles ===
Jennifer Poore (2001) Jennifer Poore became the first All-American in Ole Miss softball history when she was named to the Easton Third Team in 2001. As a catcher, she led the Rebels with a .309 batting average, accumulating 47 hits, 9 doubles, and 23 RBIs. Her performance helped set a foundation for the program's future success.

Lauren Grill (2008†, 2010) Grill was a standout shortstop, earning NFCA First Team honors in 2008 after batting .379 with 11 home runs and 39 RBIs. In 2010, she hit .443 with 8 home runs and a .569 OBP, one of the best in SEC history at the time.

Kylan Becker (2019†) In 2019, Becker led the SEC in hits (84) and set Ole Miss records with 9 triples and 34 stolen bases. Her career total of 16 triples remains the highest in program history. She earned NFCA and Softball America First Team honors that year.

Aliyah Binford (2025) Binford, a two-way player, was named to Softball America's Preseason All-America Second Team for 2025. She batted .328 with 12 home runs and 55 RBIs and also posted an 11–3 record in the circle with 80 strikeouts.

Miali Guachino (2025) Guachino was named to the D1Softball Freshman All-America Second Team after striking out 172 batters and compiling a 3.44 ERA over 146.2 innings pitched, helping lead Ole Miss to its first-ever Women's College World Series.
