= Southern Conference softball tournament =

College softball conference championship

- Conference softball championship
- Sport: Softball
- Conference: Southern Conference
- Number of teams: 8 (as of 2026 season)
- Format: Double-elimination tournament (1997–present)
- Current stadium: Jim Frost Stadium
- Current location: Chattanooga, TN
- Played: 1994–present
- Last contest: 2026
- Current champion: UNC Greensboro
- Most championships: Chattanooga (16)

Host stadiums
- Jim Frost Stadium (1998, 2001–2004, 2006, 2009–2010, 2015, 2017, 2019, 2023, 2026); UNCG Softball Stadium (2007, 2013–2014, 2016, 2018, 2021–2022, 2024); Hope Field (2025); Sywassink/Lloyd Family Stadium (2012); Eagle Field at GS Softball Complex (1996, 2011); CofC Softball Stadium at Patriot's Point (2005, 2008); UNCG Softball Field (2000); Jones Recreation Center (1999); Dot Hicks Stadium (1997); Furman Field (1994–1995)

Host locations
- Chattanooga, TN (1998, 2001–2004, 2006, 2009–2010, 2015, 2017, 2019, 2023, 2026); Greensboro, NC (2007, 2013–2014, 2016, 2018, 2021-2022, 2024); Spartanburg, SC (2025); Boone, NC (2012); Statesboro, GA (1996, 2011); Mount Pleasant, SC (1999, 2005, 2008); Huntington, WV (1997); Greenville, SC (1994–1995)

The Southern Conference softball tournament (sometimes known simply as the SoCon Tournament) is the conference championship tournament in college softball for the Southern Conference (SoCon). The winner receives the conference's automatic bid to the NCAA Division I softball tournament.

== Tournament ==
All SoCon schools that sponsor softball (as of the 2025 season, eight of the 10 full members) participate in the double-elimination tournament. Chattanooga has won 16 championships, the most in the league's history. Of schools currently sponsoring softball in the conference, Chattanooga, UNC Greensboro, Furman, Samford, and ETSU have won a tournament championship.

== Champions ==
=== Year-by-year ===
Year	School	Venue	MVP
1994	Furman	Furman Field • Greenville, SC	Kim Currier, Furman
1995	Marshall	Furman Field • Greenville, SC	Cristy Waring, Marshall
1996	Chattanooga	Eagle Field at GS Softball Complex • Statesboro, GA	April Miller, Chattanooga
1997	Chattanooga	Dot Hicks Stadium • Huntington, WV	J. D. Staton, Chattanooga
1998	Chattanooga	Jim Frost Stadium • Chattanooga, TN	Amy Robertson, Chattanooga
1999	Georgia Southern	Jones Recreation Center • Mount Pleasant, SC	Aimee Littlejohn, Georgia Southern
2000	Chattanooga	UNCG Softball Field • Greensboro, NC	Connie Ness, Chattanooga
2001	Chattanooga	Jim Frost Stadium • Chattanooga, TN	Angela Brewer, Chattanooga
2002	Chattanooga	Jim Frost Stadium • Chattanooga, TN	Awbrey Winckler, Chattanooga
2003	Chattanooga	Jim Frost Stadium • Chattanooga, TN	Melissa Ramirez, Chattanooga
2004	Chattanooga	Jim Frost Stadium • Chattanooga, TN	Melissa Ramirez, Chattanooga
2005	College of Charleston	CofC Softball Stadium at Patriot's Point • Mount Pleasant, SC	Rachel Stern, College of Charleston
2006	Georgia Southern	Jim Frost Stadium • Chattanooga, TN	Shanita Black, Georgia Southern
2007	Furman	UNCG Softball Stadium • Greensboro, NC	Amber Kiser, Furman
2008	Chattanooga	CofC Softball Stadium at Patriot's Point • Mount Pleasant, SC	Brooke Loudermilk, Chattanooga
2009	Chattanooga	Jim Frost Stadium • Chattanooga, TN	Breanna Streetmon, Chattanooga
2010	Elon	Jim Frost Stadium • Chattanooga, TN	Amber Harrell, UNC Greensboro
2011	Chattanooga	Eagle Field at GS Softball Complex • Statesboro, GA	Sara Poteat, Chattanooga
2012	Georgia Southern	Sywassink/Lloyd Family Stadium • Boone, NC	Sarah Purvis, Georgia Southern
2013	Georgia Southern	UNCG Softball Stadium • Greensboro, NC	Raeanne Hanks, UNC Greensboro
2014	Chattanooga	UNCG Softball Stadium • Greensboro, NC	Katie Henderson, Chattanooga
2015	Chattanooga	Jim Frost Stadium • Chattanooga, TN	Anyssa Robles, Chattanooga
2016	Samford	UNCG Softball Stadium • Greensboro, NC	Mollie Hanson, Samford
2017	ETSU	Jim Frost Stadium • Chattanooga, TN	Lindsey Fadnek, ETSU
2018	UNC Greensboro	UNCG Softball Stadium • Greensboro, NC	Alicia Bazonski, UNC Greensboro
2019	Chattanooga	Jim Frost Stadium • Chattanooga, TN	Stephanie Bryden, UNC Greensboro
2020	Cancelled due to the coronavirus pandemic		
2021	UNC Greensboro	UNCG Softball Stadium • Greensboro, NC	Maycin Brown, UNC Greensboro
2022	Chattanooga	UNCG Softball Stadium • Greensboro, NC	Brooke Parrott, Chattanooga
2023	UNC Greensboro	Jim Frost Stadium • Chattanooga, TN	Maddie Spell, UNC Greensboro
2024	Chattanooga	UNCG Softball Stadium • Greensboro, NC	Peja Goold, Chattanooga
2025	Mercer	Hope Field • Spartanburg, SC	Grace Taylor, Mercer
2026	UNC Greensboro	Jim Frost Stadium • Chattanooga, TN	Brooklyn Shroyer, UNC Greensboro

=== By school ===
School	Championships	Years
Chattanooga	16	1996, 1997, 1998, 2000, 2001, 2002, 2003, 2004, 2008, 2009, 2011, 2014, 2015, 2019, 2022, 2024
Georgia Southern	4	1999, 2006, 2012, 2013
UNC Greensboro	4	2018, 2021, 2023, 2026
Furman	2	1994, 2007
Marshall	1	1995
College of Charleston	1	2005
Elon	1	2010
Samford	1	2016
ETSU	1	2017
Mercer	1	2025

Italics indicate school no longer sponsors softball in the Southern Conference.
