= 2025 NCAA Division I softball season =

College softball in the United States

- Duration: February 7 – June 6, 2025
- Number of teams: 309
- Preseason No. 1: 3
- Defending Champions: Oklahoma
- TV partner/s: ESPN & ESPN+

NCAA Tournament

Women's College World Series
- Champions: Texas (1st title)
- Runners-up: Texas Tech (1st WCWS Appearance)
- Winning Coach: Mike White (1st title)
- WCWS MOP: Teagan Kavan (Texas)

Seasons
- ← 2024 2026 →

The 2025 NCAA Division I softball season, play of college softball in the United States organized by the National Collegiate Athletic Association (NCAA) at the Division I level, began in February 2025. The season progressed through the regular season, many conference tournaments and championship series, and concluded with the 2025 NCAA Division I softball tournament and 2025 Women's College World Series. The Women's College World Series, consisted of the eight remaining teams in the NCAA Tournament and held annually in Oklahoma City, Oklahoma at Devon Park, ended in June 2025.

== Realignment ==
Two schools transitioned from NCAA Division II to Division I after the 2024 season.

- Mercyhurst joined the NEC.
- West Georgia joined the ASUN.

A total of 15 softball-sponsoring schools changed conferences after the 2024 season.

- Arizona, Arizona State, and Utah joined the Big 12 Conference.
- California and Stanford joined the Atlantic Coast Conference.
- Oklahoma and Texas joined the Southeastern Conference.
- Oregon, UCLA, and Washington joined the Big Ten Conference.
- Kennesaw State joined Conference USA.
- Merrimack and Sacred Heart joined the Metro Atlantic Athletic Conference.
- The remaining softball-sponsoring member of the Pac-12 Conference, Oregon State, became a multi-sport associate of the West Coast Conference through the 2025–26 school year, after which the Pac-12 is expected to resume play with multiple new members.
- Stephen F. Austin joined the Southland Conference.

The 2025 season was the last for seven Division I softball schools in their current conferences.

- Delaware and Missouri State joined Conference USA.
- Grand Canyon joined the Mountain West Conference.
- Seattle joined the West Coast Conference.
- UMass joined the Mid-American Conference.
- Horizon League members Cleveland State and Purdue Fort Wayne dropped softball after the 2025 season.

== Other headlines ==
- March 25, 2025 – Saint Francis announced that it would reclassify to NCAA Division III starting in 2026–27, when it will leave the Northeast Conference (NEC) for the Presidents' Athletic Conference.
- April 19 – Stanford set a new NCAA single-game softball attendance record, with 13,207 at Stanford Stadium for its rivalry game against California. Stanford played its 2025 home games at its football stadium while its softball park was being renovated.
- May 5 – The NEC announced that New Haven would join the conference that July, starting a transition from the NCAA Division II Northeast-10 Conference.

== Conference standings ==
2025 America East Conference softball standings
	Conf.						Overall
Team	W		L		T	PCT	W		L		T	PCT
Binghamton ‍†‍‡‍^{y}	16	–	2	–	0	.889	36	–	14	–	0	.720
UMBC ‍‍‍	13	–	8	–	0	.619	20	–	29	–	0	.408
UAlbany ‍‍‍	9	–	8	–	0	.529	20	–	26	–	0	.435
Bryant ‍‍‍	10	–	10	–	0	.500	22	–	32	–	1	.409
UMass Lowell ‍‍‍	7	–	13	–	0	.350	17	–	29	–	0	.370
Maine ‍‍‍	3	–	17	–	0	.150	12	–	37	–	0	.245
† – Conference champion ‡ – Tournament champion y – Invited to the NCAA tournament As of May 17, 2025; Rankings from NFCA/USA Today

2025 American Athletic Conference softball standings
	Conf.						Overall
Team	W		L		T	PCT	W		L		T	PCT
Florida Atlantic ‍†‍‍^{y}	23	–	4	–	0	.852	45	–	12	–	0	.789
South Florida ‍‍‡‍^{y}	20	–	6	–	1	.759	44	–	16	–	1	.730
Charlotte ‍‍‍	17	–	10	–	0	.630	30	–	27	–	0	.526
North Texas ‍‍‍	16	–	11	–	0	.593	36	–	21	–	0	.632
Wichita State ‍‍‍	15	–	11	–	1	.574	29	–	25	–	1	.536
East Carolina ‍‍‍	14	–	13	–	0	.519	31	–	26	–	0	.544
UAB ‍‍‍	10	–	17	–	0	.370	24	–	31	–	0	.436
Tulsa ‍‍‍	8	–	19	–	0	.296	21	–	33	–	0	.389
UTSA ‍‍‍	6	–	21	–	0	.222	21	–	34	–	0	.382
Memphis ‍‍‍	5	–	22	–	0	.185	19	–	36	–	0	.345
† – Conference champion ‡ – Tournament champion y – Invited to the NCAA tournament As of May 17, 2025; Rankings from NFCA/USA Today

2025 ASUN Conference softball standings
	Conf.				Overall
Team	W		L	PCT	W		L	PCT
Gold
Eastern Kentucky ^{x}‍‍‍	17	–	5	.773	38	–	15	.717
Central Arkansas ‍‍‍	16	–	7	.696	28	–	27	.509
Austin Peay ‍‍‍	13	–	11	.542	38	–	17	.691
Lipscomb ‍‍‍	12	–	12	.500	26	–	29	.473
North Alabama ‍‍‍	10	–	14	.417	30	–	21	.588
Bellarmine ‍‍‍	2	–	21	.087	7	–	34	.171
Graphite
North Florida ^{x}‍‍‡‍^{y}	22	–	2	.917	47	–	14	.770
Stetson ‍‍‍	14	–	10	.583	33	–	28	.541
Florida Gulf Coast ‍‍‍	14	–	10	.583	29	–	30	.492
Jacksonville ‍‍‍	9	–	15	.375	23	–	27	.460
Queens (NC)* ‍‍‍	9	–	15	.375	16	–	36	.308
West Georgia* ‍‍‍	4	–	20	.167	12	–	40	.231
x – Division champion ‡ – Tournament champion y – Invited to the NCAA tournament * ineligible for the 2025 NCAA tournament due to transition from Division II; As of May 18, 2025; Rankings from NFCA/USA Today

2025 Atlantic 10 Conference softball standings
	Conf.				Overall
Team	W		L	PCT	W		L	PCT
Dayton ‍†‍‍	17	–	5	.773	30	–	18	.625
Saint Louis ‍‍‡‍^{y}	18	–	7	.720	34	–	24	.586
Fordham ‍‍‍	17	–	9	.654	30	–	26	.536
George Washington ‍‍‍	16	–	10	.615	33	–	21	.611
Saint Joseph's ‍‍‍	15	–	11	.577	30	–	25	.545
Loyola Chicago ‍‍‍	14	–	12	.538	19	–	34	.358
George Mason ‍‍‍	9	–	16	.360	18	–	35	.340
Rhode Island ‍‍‍	7	–	18	.280	14	–	35	.286
UMass ‍‍‍	6	–	17	.261	14	–	34	.292
St. Bonaventure ‍‍‍	5	–	20	.200	11	–	35	.239
† – Conference champion ‡ – Tournament champion y – Invited to the NCAA tournament As of May 17, 2025; Rankings from NFCA/USA Today

2025 Atlantic Coast Conference softball standings
	Conf.						Overall
Team	W		L		T	PCT	W		L		T	PCT
No. 5 Florida State ‍†‍‍^{y}	18	–	3	–	0	.857	49	–	12	–	0	.803
No. 13 Clemson ‍‍‡‍^{y}	19	–	5	–	0	.792	48	–	14	–	0	.774
No. 15 Virginia Tech ‍‍‍^{y}	18	–	6	–	0	.750	43	–	13	–	0	.768
No. 16 Stanford ‍‍‍^{y}	16	–	8	–	0	.667	42	–	11	–	0	.792
No. 21 Duke ‍‍‍^{y}	16	–	8	–	0	.667	41	–	18	–	0	.695
North Carolina ‍‍‍^{y}	15	–	9	–	0	.625	40	–	17	–	0	.702
No. 25 Virginia ‍‍‍^{y}	14	–	10	–	0	.583	38	–	19	–	0	.667
Georgia Tech ‍‍‍^{y}	10	–	11	–	0	.476	27	–	24	–	0	.529
California ‍‍‍^{y}	11	–	13	–	0	.458	37	–	21	–	0	.638
Louisville ‍‍‍	9	–	15	–	0	.375	26	–	25	–	0	.510
Notre Dame ‍‍‍	7	–	17	–	0	.292	23	–	31	–	1	.427
Pittsburgh ‍‍‍	7	–	17	–	0	.292	20	–	32	–	0	.385
Syracuse ‍‍‍	6	–	18	–	0	.250	27	–	22	–	0	.551
NC State ‍‍‍	6	–	18	–	0	.250	25	–	29	–	0	.463
Boston College ‍‍‍	5	–	19	–	0	.208	22	–	29	–	0	.431
† – Conference champion ‡ – Tournament champion y – Invited to the NCAA Tournament; As of May 24, 2025; Rankings from NFCA/USA Today

2025 Big 12 Conference softball standings
	Conf.						Overall
Team	W		L		T	PCT	W		L		T	PCT
No. 10 Texas Tech ‍†‍‡‍^{y}	20	–	4	–	0	.833	54	–	14	–	0	.794
No. 12 Arizona ‍‍‍^{y}	17	–	7	–	0	.708	48	–	13	–	0	.787
Iowa State ‍‍‍	15	–	9	–	0	.625	31	–	23	–	0	.574
No. 24 Oklahoma State ‍‍‍^{y}	13	–	9	–	0	.591	35	–	20	–	0	.636
Arizona State ‍‍‍^{y}	14	–	10	–	0	.583	35	–	21	–	0	.625
BYU ‍‍‍	13	–	11	–	0	.542	32	–	17	–	0	.653
UCF ‍‍‍^{y}	12	–	12	–	0	.500	35	–	24	–	1	.592
Baylor ‍‍‍	11	–	13	–	0	.458	27	–	27	–	0	.500
Kansas ‍‍‍	6	–	18	–	0	.250	22	–	28	–	0	.440
Utah ‍‍‍	5	–	19	–	0	.208	13	–	40	–	0	.245
Houston ‍‍‍	4	–	18	–	0	.182	22	–	25	–	0	.468
† – Conference champion ‡ – Tournament champion y – Invited to the NCAA Tournament; As of June 6, 2025; Rankings from NFCA/USA Today

2025 Big East Conference softball standings
	Conf.						Overall
Team	W		L		T	PCT	W		L		T	PCT
St. John's ‍†‍‍	19	–	5	–	0	.792	39	–	17	–	1	.693
UConn ‍‍‡‍^{y}	18	–	6	–	0	.750	35	–	19	–	0	.648
Villanova ‍‍‍	15	–	9	–	0	.625	27	–	26	–	1	.509
Creighton ‍‍‍	15	–	9	–	0	.625	30	–	25	–	0	.545
Butler ‍‍‍	14	–	10	–	0	.583	26	–	22	–	0	.542
Providence ‍‍‍	11	–	13	–	0	.458	25	–	31	–	0	.446
Seton Hall ‍‍‍	11	–	13	–	0	.458	29	–	23	–	0	.558
DePaul ‍‍‍	3	–	21	–	0	.125	16	–	32	–	0	.333
Georgetown ‍‍‍	2	–	22	–	0	.083	11	–	32	–	0	.256
† – Conference champion ‡ – Tournament champion y – Invited to the NCAA Tournament; As of May 17, 2025; Rankings from NFCA/USA Today

2025 Big Sky Conference softball standings
	Conf.				Overall
Team	W		L	PCT	W		L	PCT
Idaho State ‍†‍‍	13	–	2	.867	37	–	17	.685
Sacramento State ‍‍‍	10	–	5	.667	27	–	23	.540
Weber State ‍‍‡‍^{y}	8	–	7	.533	29	–	31	.483
Northern Colorado ‍‍‍	7	–	7	.500	19	–	30	.388
Portland State ‍‍‍	5	–	9	.357	12	–	39	.235
Montana ‍‍‍	1	–	14	.067	8	–	42	.160
† – Conference champion ‡ – Tournament champion y – Invited to the NCAA tournament As of May 17, 2025; Rankings from NFCA/USA Today

2025 Big South Conference softball standings
	Conf.				Overall
Team	W		L	PCT	W		L	PCT
Radford ‍†‍‍	14	–	4	.778	30	–	26	.536
Longwood ‍‍‍	11	–	7	.611	21	–	32	.396
USC Upstate ‍‍‡‍^{y}	10	–	8	.556	39	–	16	.709
Winthrop ‍‍‍	10	–	8	.556	30	–	23	.566
Charleston Southern ‍‍‍	9	–	9	.500	20	–	29	.408
Gardner–Webb ‍‍‍	5	–	13	.278	23	–	29	.442
Presbyterian ‍‍‍	4	–	14	.222	21	–	29	.420
† – Conference champion ‡ – Tournament champion y – Invited to the NCAA tournament As of May 17, 2025; Rankings from NFCA/USA Today

2025 Big Ten Conference softball standings
	Conf.						Overall
Team	W		L		T	PCT	W		L		T	PCT
No. 6 Oregon ‍†‍‍^{y}	19	–	3	–	0	.864	54	–	10	–	0	.844
No. 19 Nebraska ‍‍‍^{y}	17	–	5	–	0	.773	43	–	15	–	0	.741
No. 9 UCLA ‍‍‍^{y}	17	–	5	–	0	.773	55	–	13	–	0	.809
Northwestern ‍‍‍^{y}	16	–	6	–	0	.727	30	–	20	–	1	.598
No. 22 Ohio State ‍‍‍^{y}	16	–	6	–	0	.727	45	–	14	–	1	.758
Iowa ‍‍‍	15	–	7	–	0	.682	35	–	18	–	0	.660
Washington ‍‍‍^{y}	12	–	9	–	0	.571	35	–	19	–	0	.648
Michigan ‍‍‡‍^{y}	11	–	11	–	0	.500	39	–	21	–	0	.650
Wisconsin ‍‍‍	11	–	11	–	0	.500	33	–	21	–	0	.611
Indiana ‍‍‍^{y}	11	–	12	–	0	.478	34	–	20	–	0	.630
Penn State ‍‍‍	10	–	12	–	0	.455	25	–	27	–	0	.481
Purdue ‍‍‍	9	–	14	–	0	.391	30	–	23	–	0	.566
Illinois ‍‍‍	6	–	15	–	0	.286	22	–	28	–	0	.440
Michigan State ‍‍‍	6	–	16	–	0	.273	16	–	29	–	0	.356
Minnesota ‍‍‍	5	–	17	–	0	.227	20	–	30	–	0	.400
Maryland ‍‍‍	3	–	19	–	0	.136	18	–	31	–	0	.367
Rutgers ‍‍‍	3	–	19	–	0	.136	20	–	36	–	0	.357
† – Conference champion ‡ – Tournament champion y – Invited to the NCAA Tournament; As of June 1, 2025; Rankings from NFCA/USA Today

2025 Big West Conference softball standings
	Conf.				Overall
Team	W		L	PCT	W		L	PCT
Cal State Fullerton ‍†‍‍	22	–	5	.815	37	–	17	.685
Cal State Northridge ‍‍‍	17	–	10	.630	26	–	26	.500
UC Santa Barbara ‍‍‡‍^{y}	17	–	10	.630	35	–	25	.583
Long Beach State ‍‍‍	17	–	10	.630	27	–	22	.551
Hawaii ‍‍‍	17	–	10	.630	33	–	20	.623
UC San Diego ‍‍‍	13	–	14	.481	16	–	32	.333
UC Riverside ‍‍‍	12	–	15	.444	21	–	29	.420
UC Davis ‍‍‍	9	–	18	.333	15	–	36	.294
Cal State Bakersfield ‍‍‍	7	–	20	.259	16	–	34	.320
Cal Poly ‍‍‍	4	–	23	.148	9	–	38	.191
† – Conference champion ‡ – Tournament champion y – Invited to the NCAA tournament As of May 17, 2025; Rankings from NFCA/USA Today

2025 Coastal Athletic Association softball standings
	Conf.				Overall
Team	W		L	PCT	W		L	PCT
Delaware ‍†‍‍	23	–	4	.852	39	–	16	.709
Elon ‍‍‡‍^{y}	21	–	6	.778	33	–	21	.611
Charleston ‍‍‍	20	–	7	.741	31	–	25	.554
Campbell ‍‍‍	19	–	8	.704	37	–	20	.649
Stony Brook ‍‍‍	18	–	9	.667	25	–	25	.500
Hofstra ‍‍‍	15	–	12	.556	22	–	28	.440
UNC Wilmington ‍‍‍	14	–	13	.519	28	–	22	.560
Towson ‍‍‍	11	–	16	.407	23	–	29	.442
Monmouth ‍‍‍	7	–	20	.259	11	–	42	.208
Hampton ‍‍‍	5	–	22	.185	15	–	34	.306
Drexel ‍‍‍	5	–	22	.185	5	–	41	.109
North Carolina A&T ‍‍‍	4	–	23	.148	12	–	38	.240
† – Conference champion ‡ – Tournament champion y – Invited to the NCAA tournament As of May 17, 2025; Rankings from NFCA/USA Today

2025 Conference USA softball standings
	Conf.						Overall
Team	W		L		T	PCT	W		L		T	PCT
Liberty ‍†‍‡‍^{y}	23	–	3	–	0	.885	50	–	14	–	0	.781
Western Kentucky ‍‍‍	14	–	10	–	1	.580	30	–	21	–	1	.587
Jacksonville State ‍‍‍	15	–	11	–	0	.577	37	–	21	–	0	.638
Louisiana Tech ‍‍‍	15	–	12	–	0	.556	32	–	25	–	0	.561
New Mexico State ‍‍‍	14	–	13	–	0	.519	27	–	27	–	0	.500
Sam Houston ‍‍‍	14	–	13	–	0	.519	28	–	29	–	0	.491
Middle Tennessee ‍‍‍	13	–	14	–	0	.481	26	–	27	–	0	.491
FIU ‍‍‍	11	–	15	–	1	.426	29	–	22	–	1	.567
UTEP ‍‍‍	10	–	17	–	0	.370	22	–	28	–	0	.440
Kennesaw State ‍‍‍	3	–	24	–	0	.111	12	–	41	–	0	.226
† – Conference champion ‡ – Tournament champion y – Invited to the NCAA tournament As of May 24, 2025; Rankings from NFCA/USA Today

2025 Horizon League softball standings
	Conf.				Overall
Team	W		L	PCT	W		L	PCT
Cleveland State ‍†‍‍	17	–	7	.708	23	–	21	.523
Robert Morris ‍‍‡‍^{y}	16	–	7	.696	30	–	18	.625
IU Indy ‍‍‍	15	–	9	.625	22	–	27	.449
Purdue Fort Wayne ‍‍‍	14	–	10	.583	21	–	26	.447
Northern Kentucky ‍‍‍	12	–	10	.545	22	–	27	.449
Green Bay ‍‍‍	10	–	14	.417	19	–	32	.373
Oakland ‍‍‍	9	–	15	.375	18	–	28	.391
Detroit Mercy ‍‍‍	7	–	17	.292	10	–	33	.233
Youngstown State ‍‍‍	6	–	17	.261	14	–	39	.264
† – Conference champion ‡ – Tournament champion y – Invited to the NCAA tournament As of May 17, 2025; Rankings from NFCA/USA Today

2025 Ivy League softball standings
	Conf.						Overall
Team	W		L		T	PCT	W		L		T	PCT
Princeton ‍†‍‍	17	–	4	–	0	.810	28	–	18	–	0	.609
Harvard ‍‍‍	15	–	6	–	0	.714	26	–	13	–	0	.667
Columbia ‍‍‍	15	–	6	–	0	.714	24	–	18	–	0	.571
Brown ‍‍‡‍^{y}	13	–	8	–	0	.619	33	–	16	–	0	.673
Dartmouth ‍‍‍	10	–	11	–	0	.476	17	–	21	–	0	.447
Yale ‍‍‍	7	–	14	–	0	.333	19	–	27	–	0	.413
Cornell ‍‍‍	6	–	15	–	0	.286	16	–	22	–	0	.421
Penn ‍‍‍	1	–	20	–	0	.048	3	–	35	–	1	.090
† – Conference champion ‡ – Tournament champion y – Invited to the NCAA tournament As of May 17, 2025; Rankings from NFCA/USA Today

2025 Metro Atlantic Athletic Conference softball standings
	Conf.						Overall
Team	W		L		T	PCT	W		L		T	PCT
Marist ‍†‍‡‍^{y}	21	–	2	–	1	.896	49	–	9	–	1	.839
Fairfield ‍‍‍	18	–	7	–	0	.720	26	–	26	–	0	.500
Iona ‍‍‍	18	–	8	–	0	.692	29	–	21	–	0	.580
Siena ‍‍‍	16	–	7	–	1	.688	36	–	21	–	1	.629
Canisius ‍‍‍	15	–	10	–	0	.600	26	–	26	–	0	.500
Rider ‍‍‍	15	–	10	–	0	.600	25	–	34	–	0	.424
Quinnipiac ‍‍‍	14	–	11	–	0	.560	19	–	27	–	0	.413
Sacred Heart ‍‍‍	11	–	13	–	0	.458	21	–	27	–	0	.438
Merrimack ‍‍‍	9	–	15	–	0	.375	12	–	32	–	0	.273
Niagara ‍‍‍	8	–	16	–	0	.333	11	–	30	–	0	.268
Manhattan ‍‍‍	7	–	19	–	0	.269	10	–	35	–	0	.222
Mount St. Mary's ‍‍‍	5	–	21	–	0	.192	10	–	40	–	0	.200
Saint Peter's ‍‍‍	4	–	22	–	0	.154	13	–	35	–	0	.271
† – Conference champion ‡ – Tournament champion y – Invited to the NCAA tournament As of May 17, 2025; Rankings from NFCA/USA Today

2025 Mid-American Conference softball standings
	Conf.				Overall
Team	W		L	PCT	W		L	PCT
Miami (OH) ‍†‍‡‍^{y}	21	–	7	.750	35	–	25	.583
Ohio ‍‍‍	18	–	8	.692	37	–	19	.661
Central Michigan ‍‍‍	17	–	8	.680	26	–	25	.510
Ball State ‍‍‍	18	–	10	.643	33	–	18	.647
Akron ‍‍‍	15	–	10	.600	29	–	24	.547
Northern Illinois ‍‍‍	14	–	13	.519	21	–	29	.420
Toledo ‍‍‍	12	–	14	.462	19	–	28	.404
Buffalo ‍‍‍	10	–	17	.370	17	–	33	.340
Western Michigan ‍‍‍	10	–	17	.370	16	–	36	.308
Bowling Green ‍‍‍	7	–	19	.269	16	–	36	.308
Kent State ‍‍‍	4	–	22	.154	12	–	39	.235
† – Conference champion ‡ – Tournament champion y – Invited to the NCAA tournament As of May 17, 2025; Rankings from NFCA/USA Today

2025 Mid-Eastern Athletic Conference softball standings
	Conf.				Overall
Team	W		L	PCT	W		L	PCT
Howard ‍†‍‡‍^{y}	20	–	1	.952	31	–	20	.608
Norfolk State ‍‍‍	14	–	7	.667	22	–	23	.489
Delaware State ‍‍‍	12	–	9	.571	26	–	23	.531
Morgan State ‍‍‍	12	–	9	.571	18	–	29	.383
North Carolina Central ‍‍‍	10	–	10	.500	13	–	33	.283
South Carolina State ‍‍‍	10	–	11	.476	17	–	22	.436
Coppin State ‍‍‍	3	–	18	.143	3	–	28	.097
Maryland Eastern Shore ‍‍‍	2	–	18	.100	6	–	38	.136
† – Conference champion ‡ – Tournament champion y – Invited to the NCAA tournament As of May 17, 2025; Rankings from NFCA/USA Today

2025 Missouri Valley Conference softball standings
	Conf.				Overall
Team	W		L	PCT	W		L	PCT
Southern Illinois ‍†‍‍	21	–	5	.808	33	–	19	.635
Belmont ‍‍‡‍^{y}	20	–	7	.741	41	–	16	.719
Northern Iowa ‍‍‍	19	–	8	.704	32	–	18	.640
Illinois State ‍‍‍	16	–	11	.593	24	–	30	.444
Missouri State ‍‍‍	16	–	11	.593	20	–	33	.377
Indiana State ‍‍‍	13	–	12	.520	19	–	33	.365
Bradley ‍‍‍	13	–	14	.481	26	–	30	.464
Drake ‍‍‍	12	–	15	.444	22	–	32	.407
Murray State ‍‍‍	11	–	16	.407	21	–	28	.429
Valparaiso ‍‍‍	9	–	17	.346	20	–	30	.400
Evansville ‍‍‍	5	–	22	.185	19	–	34	.358
UIC ‍‍‍	5	–	22	.185	10	–	46	.179
† – Conference champion ‡ – Tournament champion y – Invited to the NCAA tournament As of May 17, 2025; Rankings from NFCA/USA Today

2025 Mountain West Conference softball standings
	Conf.						Overall
Team	W		L		T	PCT	W		L		T	PCT
Nevada ‍†‍‍	18	–	4	–	0	.818	41	–	14	–	0	.745
San Diego State ‍‍‡‍^{y}	16	–	6	–	0	.727	38	–	19	–	0	.667
Fresno State ‍‍‍	15	–	7	–	0	.682	36	–	19	–	0	.655
Boise State ‍‍‍	11	–	11	–	0	.500	34	–	22	–	0	.607
Utah State ‍‍‍	11	–	11	–	0	.500	26	–	26	–	0	.500
San Jose State ‍‍‍	9	–	13	–	0	.409	22	–	28	–	0	.440
UNLV ‍‍‍	7	–	15	–	0	.318	24	–	25	–	0	.490
New Mexico ‍‍‍	6	–	16	–	0	.273	21	–	30	–	1	.413
Colorado State ‍‍‍	6	–	16	–	0	.273	16	–	32	–	0	.333
† – Conference champion ‡ – Tournament champion y – Invited to the NCAA tournament As of May 17, 2025; Rankings from NFCA/USA Today

2025 Northeast Conference softball standings
	Conf.				Overall
Team	W		L	PCT	W		L	PCT
LIU ‍†‍‍	16	–	5	.762	26	–	23	.531
Saint Francis (PA) ‍‍‡‍^{y}	14	–	7	.667	26	–	26	.500
Fairleigh Dickinson ‍‍‍	13	–	8	.619	24	–	26	.480
Central Connecticut ‍‍‍	13	–	8	.619	20	–	30	.400
Wagner ‍‍‍	10	–	11	.476	15	–	26	.366
Le Moyne* ‍‍‍	7	–	11	.389	16	–	28	.364
Stonehill ‍‍‍	5	–	13	.278	16	–	34	.320
Mercyhurst ‍‍‍	3	–	18	.143	5	–	32	.135
† – Conference champion ‡ – Tournament champion y – Invited to the NCAA tournament * ineligible for the 2025 NCAA tournament due to transition from Division II; As of May 17, 2025; Rankings from NFCA/USA Today

2025 Ohio Valley Conference softball standings
	Conf.				Overall
Team	W		L	PCT	W		L	PCT
Eastern Illinois ‍†‍‡‍^{y}	21	–	5	.808	34	–	22	.607
SIU Edwardsville ‍‍‍	19	–	6	.760	32	–	22	.593
Southeast Missouri State ‍‍‍	17	–	9	.654	27	–	19	.587
Southern Indiana* ‍‍‍	13	–	11	.542	17	–	25	.405
Lindenwood* ‍‍‍	14	–	12	.538	24	–	25	.490
Tennessee State ‍‍‍	13	–	13	.500	23	–	22	.511
Tennessee Tech ‍‍‍	11	–	16	.407	21	–	35	.375
UT Martin ‍‍‍	8	–	17	.320	16	–	31	.340
Western Illinois ‍‍‍	7	–	20	.259	11	–	37	.229
Morehead State ‍‍‍	6	–	20	.231	8	–	41	.163
† – Conference champion ‡ – Tournament champion y – Invited to the NCAA tournament * ineligible for the 2025 NCAA tournament due to transition from Division II; As of May 17, 2025; Rankings from NFCA/USA Today

2025 Patriot League softball standings
	Conf.				Overall
Team	W		L	PCT	W		L	PCT
Army ‍†‍‍	16	–	2	.889	35	–	22	.614
Boston University ‍‍‡‍^{y}	14	–	4	.778	39	–	18	.684
Lehigh ‍‍‍	13	–	5	.722	28	–	24	.538
Bucknell ‍‍‍	8	–	10	.444	18	–	30	.375
Colgate ‍‍‍	6	–	12	.333	18	–	33	.353
Lafayette ‍‍‍	5	–	13	.278	7	–	31	.184
Holy Cross ‍‍‍	1	–	17	.056	8	–	37	.178
† – Conference champion ‡ – Tournament champion y – Invited to the NCAA tournament As of May 17, 2025; Rankings from NFCA/USA Today

2025 Southeastern Conference softball standings
	Conf.						Overall
Team	W		L		T	PCT	W		L		T	PCT
No. 3 Oklahoma ‍†‍‡‍^{y}	17	–	7	–	0	.708	52	–	9	–	0	.852
No. 14 Texas A&M ‍‍‡‍^{y}	16	–	7	–	0	.696	48	–	11	–	0	.814
No. 1 Texas ‍‍‍^{y}	16	–	8	–	0	.667	56	–	12	–	0	.824
No. 4 Tennessee ‍‍‍^{y}	15	–	9	–	0	.625	47	–	17	–	1	.731
No. 9 Arkansas ‍‍‍^{y}	14	–	10	–	0	.583	44	–	14	–	0	.759
No. 7 Florida ‍‍‍^{y}	14	–	10	–	0	.583	48	–	17	–	0	.738
No. 12 South Carolina ‍‍‍^{y}	13	–	11	–	0	.542	44	–	16	–	0	.733
No. 21 Mississippi State ‍‍‍^{y}	13	–	11	–	0	.542	39	–	19	–	0	.672
No. 19 LSU ‍‍‍^{y}	12	–	12	–	0	.500	42	–	16	–	0	.724
No. 15 Alabama ‍‍‍^{y}	12	–	12	–	0	.500	40	–	23	–	0	.635
No. 8 Ole Miss ‍‍‍^{y}	11	–	13	–	0	.458	42	–	21	–	0	.667
No. 22 Georgia ‍‍‍^{y}	7	–	16	–	0	.304	35	–	23	–	0	.603
Kentucky ‍‍‍^{y}	7	–	17	–	0	.292	31	–	28	–	0	.525
Auburn ‍‍‍^{y}	6	–	18	–	0	.250	34	–	23	–	0	.596
Missouri ‍‍‍	6	–	18	–	0	.250	25	–	31	–	0	.446
† – Conference champion ‡ – Tournament champion y – Invited to the NCAA tournament As of June 6, 2025; Rankings from NFCA/GoRout

2025 Southern Conference softball standings
	Conf.				Overall
Team	W		L	PCT	W		L	PCT
Chattanooga ‍†‍‍	15	–	5	.750	41	–	15	.732
UNC Greensboro ‍‍‍	14	–	6	.700	39	–	18	.684
Samford ‍‍‍	12	–	7	.632	33	–	23	.589
Wofford ‍‍‍	11	–	8	.579	30	–	22	.577
Mercer ‍‍‡‍^{y}	11	–	9	.550	40	–	26	.606
Western Carolina ‍‍‍	6	–	14	.300	22	–	31	.415
East Tennessee State ‍‍‍	6	–	15	.286	18	–	37	.327
Furman ‍‍‍	5	–	16	.238	15	–	38	.283
† – Conference champion ‡ – Tournament champion y – Invited to the NCAA tournament As of May 18, 2025; Rankings from NFCA/USA Today

2025 Southland Conference softball standings
	Conf.				Overall
Team	W		L	PCT	W		L	PCT
McNeese State ‍†‍‍	23	–	4	.852	41	–	20	.672
Southeastern Louisiana ‍‍‡‍^{y}	21	–	6	.778	50	–	16	.758
Nicholls ‍‍‍	19	–	8	.704	31	–	24	.564
Incarnate Word ‍‍‍	17	–	10	.630	29	–	21	.580
Lamar ‍‍‍	15	–	12	.556	29	–	27	.518
Stephen F. Austin ‍‍‍	14	–	13	.519	27	–	29	.482
Houston Christian ‍‍‍	10	–	17	.370	17	–	33	.340
Texas A&M–Corpus Christi ‍‍‍	6	–	21	.222	12	–	36	.250
East Texas A&M ‍‍‍	6	–	21	.222	10	–	42	.192
Northwestern State ‍‍‍	4	–	23	.148	7	–	43	.140
† – Conference champion ‡ – Tournament champion y – Invited to the NCAA tournament As of May 18, 2025; Rankings from NFCA/USA Today

2025 Southwestern Athletic Conference softball standings
	Conf.				Overall
Team	W		L	PCT	W		L	PCT
East
Florida A&M ^{x}‍‍‍	19	–	5	.792	27	–	19	.587
Jackson State ‍‍‡‍^{y}	15	–	9	.625	29	–	25	.537
Bethune-Cookman ‍‍‍	14	–	10	.583	23	–	29	.442
Alabama State ‍‍‍	14	–	10	.583	18	–	34	.346
Alabama A&M ‍‍‍	10	–	14	.417	19	–	25	.432
Mississippi Valley State ‍‍‍	0	–	24	.000	2	–	36	.053
West
Prairie View A&M ^{x}‍‍‍	21	–	3	.875	28	–	21	.571
Southern ‍‍‍	13	–	11	.542	23	–	24	.489
Texas Southern ‍‍‍	13	–	11	.542	14	–	25	.359
Grambling State ‍‍‍	10	–	14	.417	17	–	31	.354
Arkansas-Pine Bluff ‍‍‍	9	–	15	.375	14	–	28	.333
Alcorn State ‍‍‍	6	–	18	.250	11	–	29	.275
x – Division champion ‡ – Tournament champion y – Invited to the NCAA tournament As of May 17, 2025; Rankings from NFCA/USA Today

2025 Summit League softball standings
	Conf.				Overall
Team	W		L	PCT	W		L	PCT
Omaha ‍†‍‡‍^{y}	14	–	4	.778	40	–	13	.755
St. Thomas* ‍†‍‍	14	–	4	.778	33	–	17	.660
South Dakota State ‍‍‍	13	–	5	.722	29	–	26	.527
South Dakota ‍‍‍	8	–	10	.444	32	–	24	.571
North Dakota ‍‍‍	7	–	11	.389	26	–	30	.464
North Dakota State ‍‍‍	6	–	12	.333	19	–	31	.380
Kansas City ‍‍‍	1	–	17	.056	5	–	43	.104
† – Conference champion ‡ – Tournament champion y – Invited to the NCAA tournament * Ineligible for the 2025 NCAA tournament due to transition from Division III; As of May 17, 2025; Rankings from NFCA/USA Today

2025 Sun Belt Conference softball standings
	Conf.				Overall
Team	W		L	PCT	W		L	PCT
Texas State ‍†‍‍	16	–	8	.667	34	–	19	.642
Marshall ‍‍‍	15	–	9	.625	31	–	23	.574
Louisiana–Monroe ‍‍‍	14	–	10	.583	35	–	22	.614
Louisiana ‍‍‍	14	–	10	.583	29	–	25	.537
Coastal Carolina ‍‍‡‍^{y}	13	–	11	.542	42	–	18	.700
Georgia Southern ‍‍‍	13	–	11	.542	29	–	25	.537
Appalachian State ‍‍‍	13	–	11	.542	23	–	27	.460
Troy ‍‍‍	12	–	12	.500	33	–	24	.579
James Madison ‍‍‍	11	–	13	.458	28	–	25	.528
Southern Miss ‍‍‍	10	–	13	.435	23	–	29	.442
South Alabama ‍‍‍	9	–	14	.391	20	–	31	.392
Georgia State ‍‍‍	3	–	21	.125	12	–	41	.226
† – Conference champion ‡ – Tournament champion y – Invited to the NCAA tournament As of May 17, 2025; Rankings from NFCA/USA Today

2025 Western Athletic Conference softball standings
	Conf.				Overall
Team	W		L	PCT	W		L	PCT
No. 23 Grand Canyon ‍†‍‡‍^{y}	21	–	2	.913	46	–	7	.868
Tarleton State ‍‍‍	16	–	8	.667	36	–	22	.621
Southern Utah ‍‍‍	13	–	11	.542	18	–	27	.400
Seattle ‍‍‍	11	–	13	.458	28	–	25	.528
Abilene Christian ‍‍‍	11	–	13	.458	15	–	38	.283
California Baptist ‍‍‍	11	–	13	.458	26	–	32	.448
UT Arlington ‍‍‍	10	–	14	.417	24	–	25	.490
Utah Valley ‍‍‍	8	–	15	.348	18	–	33	.353
Utah Tech ‍‍‍	6	–	18	.250	15	–	35	.300
† – Conference champion ‡ – Tournament champion y – Invited to the NCAA tournament As of May 17, 2025; Rankings from NFCA/USA Today

2025 West Coast Conference softball standings
	Conf.				Overall
Team	W		L	PCT	W		L	PCT
Santa Clara ‍†‍‍^{y}	11	–	4	.733	32	–	21	.604
Saint Mary's ‍†‍‍	11	–	4	.733	28	–	23	.549
Oregon State ‍‍‍	7	–	8	.467	24	–	23	.511
Loyola Marymount ‍‍‍	7	–	8	.467	22	–	31	.415
Pacific ‍‍‍	5	–	10	.333	16	–	34	.320
San Diego ‍‍‍	4	–	11	.267	20	–	29	.408
† – Conference champion y – Invited to the NCAA tournament As of May 17, 2025; Rankings from NFCA/USA Today

=== Conference winners and tournaments ===
Of the 31 Division I athletic conferences that sponsor softball, 30 end their regular seasons with a single-elimination tournament or a double elimination tournament. The teams in each conference that win their regular season title are given the number one seed in each tournament. Only one conference, the West Coast Conference, does not hold a conference tournament. The winners of these tournaments, plus the West Coast Conference regular-season champions, received automatic invitations to the 2025 NCAA Division I softball tournament.

Conference	Regular Season Winner	Conference Player of the Year	Conference Pitcher of the Year	Conference Coach of the Year	Conference Tournament	Tournament Venue • City	Tournament Winner
America East Conference	Binghamton	Elisa Allen, Binghamton	Brianna Roberts, Binghamton	Jess Bump, Binghamton	2025 America East Conference softball tournament	Bearcats Softball Complex • Binghamton, NY	Binghamton
American Athletic Conference	Florida Atlantic	Jenna Lord, Charlotte	Autumn Courtney, Florida Atlantic	Florida Atlantic	2025 American Athletic Conference softball tournament	USF Softball Stadium • Tampa, FL	South Florida
Atlantic 10 Conference	Dayton	Sydney Wells, Fordham & Abby Mallo, Saint Louis	Anna Reed, George Washington	Christy Connoyer, Saint Louis	2025 Atlantic 10 Conference softball tournament	GW Softball Field • Washington, D.C.	Saint Louis
Atlantic Coast Conference	Florida State	Cori McMillan, Virginia Tech	Reese Basinger, Clemson	Lonni Alameda, Florida State	2025 Atlantic Coast Conference softball tournament	Boston College Softball Field • Chestnut Hill, MA	Clemson
Atlantic Sun Conference	Gold - Eastern Kentucky; Graphite - North Florida (Note: Top seed in conference tournament.)	Allison Benning, North Florida	Allison Benning, North Florida	Jeff Conrad, North Florida	2025 Atlantic Sun Conference softball tournament	Choccolocco Park • Oxford, AL	North Florida
Big 12 Conference	Texas Tech	Devyn Netz, Arizona	NiJaree Canady, Texas Tech	Gerry Glasco, Texas Tech	2025 Big 12 Conference softball tournament	Devon Park • Oklahoma City, OK	Texas Tech
Big East Conference	St. John's	Grace Jenkins, UConn	Ana Serafinko, St. John's	St. John's	2025 Big East Conference softball tournament	Villanova Softball Complex • Villanova, PA	UConn
Big Sky Conference	Idaho State	Ava Brown, Idaho State	Kasey Aguinaga, Idaho State	Andrew Rich, Idaho State	2025 Big Sky Conference softball tournament	Gloria Rodriguez Softball Field • Greeley, CO	Weber State
Big South Conference	Radford	Megan Powell, Winthrop	Dakota Redmon, Radford	Kevin Fagan, Radford	2025 Big South Conference softball tournament	PC Softball Complex • Clinton, SC	USC Upstate
Big Ten Conference	Oregon	Jordy Bahl, Nebraska	Jordy Bahl, Nebraska	Melyssa Lombardi, Oregon	2025 Big Ten softball tournament	Bittinger Stadium • West Lafayette, IN	Michigan
Big West Conference	Cal State Fullerton	Ava Arce, Cal State Fullerton	Malaya Johnson, UC Santa Barbara	Gina Oaks Garcia, Cal State Fullerton	2025 Big West Conference softball tournament	Anderson Family Field • Fullerton, CA	UC Santa Barbara
Coastal Athletic Association	Delaware	Sydney Shaffer, Delaware	Billie Kerwood, Delaware	Tracey Lynch, Charleston	2025 Coastal Athletic Association softball tournament	Amanda Littlejohn Stadium • Buies Creek, NC	Elon
Conference USA	Liberty	Rachel Roupe, Liberty	Elena Escobar, Liberty	Dot Richardson, Liberty	2025 Conference USA softball tournament	WKU Softball Field • Bowling Green, KY	Liberty
Horizon League	Cleveland State	Sara Ebner, Green Bay & Molly Kable, IU Indy	Melissa Holzopfel, Cleveland State	Amy Kyler, Cleveland State	2025 Horizon League softball tournament	Viking Field • Cleveland, OH	Robert Morris
Ivy League	Princeton	Laurel Moody, Brown	Brielle Wright, Princeton	Princeton	2025 Ivy League Softball Championship Series	Campus sites	Brown
Metro Atlantic Athletic Conference	Marist	Miah McDonald, Marist	Maddie Pleasants, Marist	Joe Ausanio, Marist	2025 Metro Atlantic Athletic Conference softball tournament	Marist Softball Stadium • Poughkeepsie, NY	Marist
Mid-American Conference	Miami (OH)	McKayla Timmons, Ball State	Skipp Miller, Ohio	Mandy Gardner-Colegate, Miami (OH) & Jenna Hall, Ohio	2025 Mid-American Conference softball tournament	Firestone Stadium • Akron, OH	Miami (OH)
Mid-Eastern Athletic Conference	Howard	Taylor Ames-Alexander, South Carolina State	Jaden Davis, NC Central	Angie Nicholson, Norfolk State	2025 Mid-Eastern Athletic Conference softball tournament	NSU Softball Stadium • Norfolk, VA	Howard
Missouri Valley Conference	Southern Illinois	Kate Lappe, Northern Iowa	Maya Johnson, Belmont	Southern Illinois	2025 Missouri Valley Conference softball tournament	Ron Buel Field • Des Moines, IA	Belmont
Mountain West Conference	Nevada	Aaliyah Jenkins, Nevada	Serayah Neiss, Fresno State	Victoria Hayward, Nevada	2025 Mountain West Conference softball tournament	SDSU Softball Stadium • San Diego, CA	San Diego State
Northeast Conference	LIU	Savannah Nash, Saint Francis	Brooklyn Shroyer, Fairleigh Dickinson	LIU	2025 Northeast Conference softball tournament	LIU Softball Complex • Brooklyn, NY	Saint Francis
Ohio Valley Conference	Eastern Illinois	Kendall Grover, Eastern Illinois & Payton Brown, Western Illinois	McKenzie Oslanzi, Eastern Illinois	Ben Sorden, SIUE	2025 Ohio Valley Conference softball tournament	Petersen Hotels Field at the Louisville Slugger Sports Complex • Peoria, IL	Eastern Illinois
Patriot League	Army	Ashton White, Army	Kasey Ricard, Boston	Jen Consaul, Army	2025 Patriot League softball tournament	Campus sites	Boston University
Southeastern Conference	Oklahoma	Bri Ellis, Arkansas	Karlyn Pickens, Tennessee	Patty Gasso, Oklahoma	2025 Southeastern Conference softball tournament	Jack Turner Stadium • Athens, GA	Oklahoma & Texas A&M (Note: The SEC tournament championship game was canceled due to inclement weather and both teams were declared co-champions, with Oklahoma getting the conference's automatic berth for being the higher seed.)
Southern Conference	Chattanooga	Olivia Lipari, Chattanooga	Peja Goold, Chattanooga	Frank Reed, Chattanooga	2025 Southern Conference softball tournament	Hope Field • Spartanburg, SC	Mercer
Southland Conference	McNeese	Victoria Altamirano, Incarnate Word	Maddie Taylor, McNeese	James Landreneau, McNeese	2025 Southland Conference softball tournament	Campus sites	Southeastern Louisiana
Southwestern Athletic Conference	East – Florida A&M; West – Prairie View A&M	Kamryn Broussard, Grambling State	Cailin Massey, Prairie View A&M	Vernon Bland, Prairie View A&M	2025 Southwestern Athletic Conference softball tournament	Gulfport Sportsplex • Gulfport, MS	Jackson State
Summit League	Omaha & St. Thomas (Note: St. Thomas ineligible for postseason play due to transition from Division III)	Abby Gentry, South Dakota State	Maddia Groff, Omaha	Jennifer Trotter, St. Thomas	2025 Summit League softball tournament	Jerald T. Moriarty Softball Field • Brookings, SD	Omaha
Sun Belt Conference	Texas State	Aiyana Coleman, Texas State	Nicolette Picone, Coastal Carolina	Molly Fichtner, Louisiana–Monroe	2025 Sun Belt Conference softball tournament	Troy Softball Complex • Troy, AL	Coastal Carolina
West Coast Conference	Saint Mary's & Santa Clara (Note: Received WCC's automatic berth for winning season series against Saint Mary's.)	Cairah Curran, Santa Clara	Cari Ferguson, Santa Clara	Gina Carbonatto, Santa Clara	No tournament; regular season champion earns auto bid		
Western Athletic Conference	Grand Canyon	Savannah Kirk, Grand Canyon	Meghan Golden, Grand Canyon	Shanon Hays, Grand Canyon	2025 Western Athletic Conference softball tournament	John C. Funk Stadium • Riverside, CA	Grand Canyon

== Awards ==
- USA Softball Collegiate Player of the Year: Bri Ellis, Arkansas
- NFCA National Player of the Year: Jordy Bahl, Nebraska
- Softball America Player of the Year: Bri Ellis, Arkansas
- NFCA National Pitcher of the Year: NiJaree Canady, Texas Tech
- Softball America Pitcher of the Year: Karlyn Pickens, Tennessee
- NFCA National Freshman of the Year: Taylor Shumaker, Florida
- Softball America Freshman of the Year: Taylor Shumaker, Florida
- NFCA Catcher of the Year: Reese Atwood, Texas
- NFCA Golden Shoe Award: Kai Luschar, Oregon

== All-America Teams ==
The following players were members of the All-American Teams.

First Team

Position	Player	Class	School
P	NiJaree Canady	JR.	Texas Tech
P	Karlyn Pickens	JR.	Tennessee
P	Kenzie Brown	SR.	Arizona State
C	Reese Atwood	JR.	Texas
1B	Bri Ellis	SR.	Arkansas
2B	Maddie Moore	SR.	Clemson
3B	Jordan Woolery	JR.	UCLA
SS	Isa Torres	SO.	Florida State
OF	Cori McMillan	SR.	Virginia Tech
OF	Taylor Minnick	SR.	Indiana
OF	Sierra Sacco	SR.	Mississippi State
UT	Jordy Bahl	JR.	Nebraska
UT	Ella Parker	SO.	Oklahoma
AT-L	Megan Grant	JR.	UCLA
AT-L	Kasidi Pickering	SO.	Oklahoma
AT-L	Jasmyn Burns	SO.	Ohio State
AT-L	Taylor Shumaker	FR.	Florida
AT-L	Maya Johnson	R-JR.	Belmont

Second Team

Position	Player	Class	School
P	Teagan Kavan	SO.	Texas
P	Ruby Meylan	JR.	Oklahoma State
P	Sam Landry	SR.	Oklahoma
C	Sydney Stewart	JR.	Arizona
1B	Mya Perez	SO.	Texas A&M
2B	Mia Williams	SO.	Florida
3B	Mia Scott	SR.	Texas
SS	River Mahler	JR.	Stanford
OF	Kendra Falby	SR.	Florida
OF	Kennedy Harp	SO.	Florida State
OF	Audrey Vandagriff	FR.	Alabama
UT	Devyn Netz	R-SR.	Arizona
UT	Mac Barbara	GS	Texas A&M
AT-L	Tori Edwards	R-FR.	LSU
AT-L	Jade Hylton	JR.	Virginia
AT-L	Taylor Pannell	R-SO.	Tennessee
AT-L	Kedre Luschar	SR.	Oregon
AT-L	Rylee McCoy	FR.	Oregon

Third Team

Position	Player	Class	School
P	Taylor Tinsley	JR.	UCLA
P	Lyndsey Grein	JR.	Oregon
P	Autumn Courtney	JR.	Florida Atlantic
C	Julia Crenshaw	SR.	Missouri
1B	Georgia Hood	SR.	Coastal Carolina
2B	Kat Rodriguez	GS	North Carolina
3B	Ella McDowell	FR.	Arkansas
SS	Gabbie Garcia	FR.	Oklahoma
OF	Jenissa Conway	SO.	Michigan
OF	Dakota Kennedy	JR.	Arizona
OF	Emily Jones	JR.	Stanford
UT	Brianna Copeland	SR.	Indiana
UT	Kendra Lewis	FR.	Wisconsin
AT-L	Savannah Pola	SR.	UCLA
AT-L	Ilove'a Brittingham	FR.	BYU
AT-L	Maci Bergeron	JR.	LSU
AT-L	Rachel Roupe	SR.	Liberty
AT-L	Shaylon Govan	SR.	Baylor

== See also ==
- 2025 NCAA Division I baseball season
