= 2026 Southern Conference softball tournament =

- Teams: 8
- Format: Single elimination play-in, then six-team double-elimination tournament
- Finals site: Frost Stadium; Chattanooga, Tennessee
- Champions: UNC Greensboro (4th title)
- Winning coach: Janelle Breneman (4th title)
- MVP: Brooklyn Shroyer (UNC Greensboro)
- Television: ESPN+

2026 Southern Conference softball standings
	Conf.						Overall
Team	W		L		T	PCT	W		L		T	PCT
UNC Greensboro ‍†‍‡‍^{y}	17	–	4	–	0	.810	42	–	17	–	0	.712
Samford ‍‍‍	14	–	7	–	0	.667	28	–	31	–	0	.475
Western Carolina ‍‍‍	12	–	9	–	0	.571	34	–	24	–	0	.586
Wofford ‍‍‍	10	–	11	–	0	.476	35	–	19	–	0	.648
Chattanooga ‍‍‍	10	–	11	–	0	.476	25	–	29	–	1	.464
East Tennessee State ‍‍‍	8	–	13	–	0	.381	22	–	30	–	0	.423
Mercer ‍‍‍	8	–	13	–	0	.381	20	–	30	–	0	.400
Furman ‍‍‍	5	–	16	–	0	.238	13	–	40	–	0	.245
† – Conference champion ‡ – Tournament champion y – Invited to the NCAA tournament As of May 10, 2026; Rankings from NFCA/USA Today

The 2026 Southern Conference softball tournament was held from May 7 through May 10 at Frost Stadium on the campus of the University of Tennessee at Chattanooga, located in Chattanooga, Tennessee. The winner of the conference tournament, UNC Greensboro, received an automatic bid to the 2026 NCAA Division I softball tournament.

== Format and Seeding ==
All eight SoCon softball teams will participate in the tournament and will be seeded based on conference record. The bottom four seeds will play in a single-elimination play-in round to begin the tournament. The two play-in round winners will then join the top four seeds in a six-team double-elimination tournament, with the top two seeds receiving byes into the third round, and the third and fourth placed teams playing the play-in round winners in the second round. The Mercer Bears are defending champions, having won the 2025 edition of the tournament.

== Bracket ==
Play-in round Thursday, May 7
Game 1 - 10:00 a.m.
5	Chattanooga	10
8	Furman	3
Game 2 - 1:00 p.m.
6	East Tennessee State	7
7	Mercer	0

Second round Thursday, May 7
Game 3 - 4:00 p.m.
4	Wofford	2
5	Chattanooga	0
Game 4 - 7:00 p.m.
3	Western Carolina	2
6	East Tennessee State	1
Lower third round Friday, May 8
Game 7 - 4:00 p.m.
6	East Tennessee State	4
4	Wofford	5
Game 8 - 7:00 p.m.
5	Chattanooga	7
3	Western Carolina	6

Third round Friday, May 8
Game 5 - 10:00 a.m.
1	UNC Greensboro	19^{(5)}
4	Wofford	4
Game 6 - 1:00 p.m.
2	Samford	14^{(5)}
3	Western Carolina	1
Lower semifinal Saturday, May 9
Game 10 - 1:00 p.m.
4	Wofford	0
5	Chattanooga	7

Semifinals; Saturday, May 9
Game 9 - 10:00 a.m.
1	UNC Greensboro	5
2	Samford	0
Lower final Saturday, May 9
Game 11 - 4:00 p.m.
2	Samford	8
5	Chattanooga	6

Final; Sunday May, 10
Games 12/13 - 1:00 p.m.
1	UNC Greensboro	4	–
2	Samford	0	–

Game times are in EDT.
Rankings denote tournament seed.
Superscripted number next to scores denote games that use extra innings or the run rule.
Source: Southern Conference

== Schedule ==
Game	Time^{*}	Matchup^{#}	Score	Reference
Day 1 (Thursday, May 7)
1	10:00 a.m.	No. 5 Chattanooga vs. No. 8 Furman	10–3	
2	1:00 p.m.	No. 6 East Tennessee State vs. No. 7 Mercer	7–0	
3	4:00 p.m.	No. 5 Chattanooga vs. No. 4 Wofford	0–2	
4	7:00 p.m.	No. 6 East Tennessee State vs. No. 3 Western Carolina	1–2	
Day 2 (Friday, May 8)
5	10:00 a.m.	No. 4 Wofford vs. No. 1 UNC Greensboro	4–19^{(5)}	
6	1:00 p.m.	No. 3 Western Carolina vs. No. 2 Samford	1–14^{(5)}	
7	4:00 p.m.	No. 6 East Tennessee State vs. No. 4 Wofford	4–5	
8	7:00 p.m.	No. 5 Chattanooga vs. No. 3 Western Carolina	7–6	
Day 3 (Saturday, May 9)
9	10:00 a.m.	No. 1 UNC Greensboro vs. No. 2 Samford	5–0	
10	1:00;p.m.	No. 4 Wofford vs. No. 5 Chattanooga	0–7	
11	7:00 p.m.	No. 2 Samford vs. No. 5 Chattanooga	8–6	
Day 4 (Sunday, May 10)
12	1:00 p.m.	No. 1 UNC Greensboro vs. No. 2 Samford	4–0	
* Game times are in EDT. # Rankings denote tournament seed. Superscripted number next to scores denote games that use extra innings or the run rule. Source: Southern Conference

== All Tournament Team ==
Player	Team
Avery Bouquin	UNC Greensboro
Laney Deane	UNC Greensboro
Macy Michael	UNC Greensboro
**Brooklyn Shroyer**	UNC Greensboro
Baileigh Pitts	Chattanooga
Taylor Long	Chattanooga
Katie Hart	Samford
Olivia Shaw	Samford
Makinley Turner	Samford
Lily Bell	Western Carolina

MVP in bold
