= 2018 Southern Conference softball tournament =

- Teams: 7
- Format: Double-elimination tournament
- Finals site: UNCG Softball Stadium; Greensboro, North Carolina
- Champions: UNC Greensboro (1st title)
- Winning coach: Janelle Breneman (1st title)
- MVP: Alicia Bazonski (UNC Greensboro)

The 2018 Southern Conference softball tournament was held at UNCG Softball Stadium on the campus of the University of North Carolina at Greensboro in Greensboro, North Carolina, from May 9 through May 12, 2018. UNC Greensboro won their first-ever tournament championship and earned the SoCon's automatic bid to the 2018 NCAA Division I softball tournament.

== Bracket ==
Upper round 1	Upper round 2	Upper final	Final
1	UNC Greensboro	4
4	Chattanooga	1
4	Chattanooga	3
5	Samford	1
1	UNC Greensboro	6
6	East Tennessee State	3
2	Mercer	8
7	Western Carolina	7
2	Mercer	3
7	East Tennessee State	5
3	Furman	1
6	East Tennessee State	4
1	UNC Greensboro	5	–
6	East Tennessee State	2	–
Lower round 1	Lower round 2	Lower round 3	Lower final
4	Chattanooga	1
7	Western Carolina	0	3	Furman	9	6	East Tennessee State	4
3	Furman	1	3	Furman	1	3	Furman	1
5	Samford	0
5	Samford	10
2	Mercer	6
