= 2023 Southern Conference softball tournament =

- Teams: 7
- Format: Double-elimination tournament
- Finals site: Frost Stadium; Chattanooga, Tennessee
- Champions: UNC Greensboro (2nd title)
- Winning coach: Janelle Breneman (3rd title)
- MVP: Maddie Spell (UNC Greensboro)
- Television: ESPN+

2023 Southern Conference softball standings
	Conf.				Overall
Team	W		L	PCT	W		L	PCT
UNC Greensboro ‍†‍‡‍^{y}	13	–	4	.765	37	–	22	.627
Samford ‍‍‍	12	–	6	.667	26	–	31	.456
Furman ‍‍‍	8	–	9	.471	20	–	32	.385
Western Carolina ‍‍‍	8	–	10	.444	21	–	26	.447
Mercer ‍‍‍	8	–	10	.444	20	–	37	.351
Chattanooga ‍‍‍	7	–	11	.389	25	–	27	.481
East Tennessee State ‍‍‍	6	–	12	.333	17	–	37	.315
† – Conference champion ‡ – Tournament champion y – Invited to the NCAA tournament As of May 20, 2023; Rankings from NFCA/USA Today

The 2023 Southern Conference softball tournament was held at Frost Stadium on the campus of the University of Tennessee at Chattanooga in Chattanooga, Tennessee, from May 10 through May 13, 2023. The tournament was won by the UNC Greensboro Spartans, who earned the Southern Conference's automatic bid to the 2023 NCAA Division I softball tournament.

== Tournament ==
=== Bracket ===
Upper round 1	Upper round 2	Upper final	Final
1	UNC Greensboro	1
4	Western Carolina	0
4	Western Carolina	3
5	Mercer	2
1	UNC Greensboro	2^{(9)}
2	Samford	1
2	Samford	4
7	East Tennessee State	2
2	Samford	6
6	Chattanooga	5
3	Furman	3
6	Chattanooga	8
1	UNC Greensboro	7	–
2	Samford	6	–
Lower round 1	Lower round 2	Lower round 3	Lower final
4	Western Carolina	1
3	Furman	4	7	East Tennessee State	3	2	Samford	2
7	East Tennessee State	6	7	East Tennessee State	3	5	Mercer	1
5	Mercer	4
5	Mercer	11
6	Chattanooga	8

== All Tournament Team ==
Player	Team
Brianna Bailey	East Tennessee State
Riley Nayadley	East Tennessee State
Alyssa Woods	Mercer
Delaney Cumbie	UNC Greensboro
Jessie Shipley	UNC Greensboro
**Maddie Spell**	UNC Greensboro
Merritt Cahoon	Chattanooga
Reagan Armour	Samford
McKenzie Newcomb	Samford
Sarah Squillace	Samford

MVP in bold
