= 2016 Southern Conference softball tournament =

- Teams: 7
- Format: Double-elimination tournament
- Finals site: UNCG Softball Stadium; Greensboro, North Carolina
- Champions: Samford University (1st title)
- Winning coach: Mandy Buford (1st title)
- MVP: Mollie Hanson (Samford University)

The 2016 Southern Conference softball tournament was held at UNCG Softball Stadium on the campus of the University of North Carolina at Greensboro in Greensboro, North Carolina, from May 6 through May 14, 2016. Chattanooga won their eight tournament championship and earned the SoCon's automatic bid to the 2015 NCAA Division I softball tournament. The Championship game was broadcast on ESPN3 while all other games were broadcast on the SoCon Digital Network.

== Format ==
The SoCon Tournament takes the top 7 teams and places them in a double elimination tournament, up until the championship. Seed 1 gets a bye to the 2nd Round. The championship game is played with a winner-take-all single game format.

== Tournament ==
Upper round 1	Upper round 2	Upper final	Final
1	Samford University	3
4	UNC Greensboro	0
4	UNC Greensboro	3
5	East Tennessee State	2
1	Samford	2
7	Mercer	0
2	Furman	2
7	Mercer	5 ^{9}
7	Mercer	7
6	Chattanooga	4
3	Western Carolina	3
6	Chattanooga	11
1	Samford	4	—
2	Furman	3	—
Lower round 1	Lower round 2	Lower round 3	Lower final
4	UNC Greensboro	0
2	Furman	7	2	Furman	3	7	Mercer	1
3	Western Carolina	4	2	Furman	9	2	Furman	8
6	Chattanooga	6
6	Chattanooga	6
5	East Tennessee State	2
