= 2022 Southern Conference softball tournament =

- Teams: 7
- Format: Double-elimination tournament
- Finals site: UNCG Softball Stadium; Greensboro, North Carolina
- Champions: Chattanooga (15th title)
- Winning coach: Frank Reed (10th title)
- MVP: Brooke Parrott (Chattanooga)
- Television: ESPN+

2022 Southern Conference softball standings
	Conf.				Overall
Team	W		L	PCT	W		L	PCT
UNC Greensboro ‍†‍‍	16	–	2	.889	39	–	18	.684
Samford ‍‍‍	15	–	3	.833	34	–	19	.642
Chattanooga ‍‍‡‍^{y}	9	–	9	.500	30	–	27	.526
Furman ‍‍‍	8	–	10	.444	22	–	33	.400
Mercer ‍‍‍	7	–	11	.389	16	–	40	.286
Western Carolina ‍‍‍	4	–	14	.222	19	–	34	.358
East Tennessee State ‍‍‍	4	–	14	.222	8	–	48	.143
† – Conference champion ‡ – Tournament champion y – Invited to the NCAA tournament As of June 5, 2022; Rankings from NFCA/USA Today

The 2022 Southern Conference softball tournament was held at the UNCG Softball Stadium on the campus of the University of North Carolina at Greensboro in Greensboro, North Carolina, from May 11 through May 14, 2022. The tournament was won by the Chattanooga Mocs, who earned the Southern Conference's automatic bid to the 2022 NCAA Division I softball tournament.

== Tournament ==
=== Bracket ===
Upper round 1	Upper round 2	Upper final	Final
1	UNC Greensboro	9^{(5)}
4	Furman	0
4	Furman	4
5	Mercer	3
1	UNC Greensboro	2
3	Chattanooga	10^{(5)}
2	Samford	4^{(9)}
7	East Tennessee State	3
2	Samford	0
3	Chattanooga	4
3	Chattanooga	3^{(10)}
6	Western Carolina	2
3	Chattanooga	9^{(8)}	–
1	UNC Greensboro	7	–
Lower round 1	Lower round 2	Lower round 3	Lower final
4	Furman	8
6	Western Carolina	3	6	Western Carolina	5	1	UNC Greensboro	3
7	East Tennessee State	2	4	Furman	1	2	Samford	0
2	Samford	6
2	Samford	7
5	Mercer	6

== All Tournament Team ==
Player	Team
Madison Headley	Mercer
Diamond Williams	Mercer
Delaney Cumbie	UNC Greensboro
Makenna Matthijs	UNC Greensboro
Morgan Scott	UNC Greensboro
McKayla Cothran	Samford
Ansley Yantis	Samford
Reagan Armour	Chattanooga
Emily Coltharp	Chattanooga
**Brooke Parrott**	Chattanooga
Kaili Phillips	Chattanooga

MVP in bold
