= 2017 Southern Conference softball tournament =

- Teams: 7
- Format: Double-elimination tournament
- Finals site: Jim Frost Stadium; Chattanooga, Tennessee
- Champions: ETSU (1st title)
- Winning coach: Brad Irwin (1st title)
- MVP: Lindsey Fadnek (ETSU)
- Attendance: 414
- Television: ESPN3; SoCon Digital Network

The 2017 Southern Conference softball tournament was held at Jim Frost Stadium on the campus of the University of Tennessee at Chattanooga in Chattanooga, Tennessee, from May 10 through May 13, 2017. ETSU won their first-ever tournament championship and earned the SoCon's automatic bid to the 2017 NCAA Division I softball tournament. The Championship game was broadcast on ESPN3 while all other games were broadcast on the SoCon Digital Network.

== Format ==
The SoCon Tournament takes the top 7 teams and places them in a double elimination tournament, up until the championship. Seed 1 gets a bye to the 2nd Round. The championship game is played with a winner-take-all single game format.

== Bracket ==
Upper round 1	Upper round 2	Upper final	Final
1	UNC Greensboro	0
5	Mercer	3
4	Samford University	3
5	Mercer	5
3	East Tennessee State	4
5	Mercer	3
2	Furman	4
7	Chattanooga	5
7	Chattanooga	0
3	East Tennessee State	1
3	East Tennessee State	6
6	Western Carolina	0
3	East Tennessee State	6	–
4	Samford	0	–
Lower round 1	Lower round 2	Lower round 3	Lower final
1	UNC Greensboro	6
2	Furman	1	6	Western Carolina	5	5	Mercer	3
6	Western Carolina	4	1	UNC Greensboro	1	4	Samford	4
4	Samford	3
4	Samford	9
7	Chattanooga	8
