= 2015 Southern Conference softball tournament =

- Teams: 7
- Format: Double-elimination tournament
- Finals site: Jim Frost Stadium; Chattanooga, Tennessee
- Champions: Chattanooga (13th title)
- Winning coach: Frank Reed (8th title)
- MVP: Anyssa Robles (Chattanooga)

The 2015 Southern Conference softball tournament was held at Jim Frost Stadium on the campus of Chattanooga University in Chattanooga, Tennessee, from May 6 through May 9, 2015. Chattanooga won their eight tournament championship and earned the SoCon's automatic bid to the 2015 NCAA Division I softball tournament. The Championship game was broadcast on ESPN3 while all other games were broadcast on the SoCon Digital Network.

== Format ==
The SoCon Tournament takes the top 7 teams and places them in a double elimination tournament, up until the championship. Seed 1 gets a bye to the 2nd Round. The championship game is played with a winner-take-all single game format. Jason Patterson and Phil Cox will call all the games for the SoCon Digital Network. Darren Goldwater and Stephanie Cushing will call the championship for ESPN3.

== Tournament ==
Upper round 1	Upper round 2	Upper final	Final
1	Chattanooga	5
5	Western Carolina	4^{(10)}
4	Furman	1
5	Western Carolina	6
1	Chattanooga	7
3	Mercer	6
2	Samford	3
7	East Tennessee State	1
2	Samford	0
3	Mercer	2
3	Mercer	9
6	UNC Greensboro	0^{(6)}
1	Chattanooga	3	–
3	Mercer	1	–
Lower round 1	Lower round 2	Lower round 3	Lower final
5	Western Carolina	6
6	UNC Greensboro	5	6	UNC Greensboro	1	3	Mercer	2
7	East Tennessee State	2	5	Western Carolina	2	4	Furman	0
4	Furman	6
2	Samford	3
4	Furman	6
