= 2025 Southeastern Louisiana Lady Lions softball team =

American college softball season

2025 Southeastern Louisiana Lady Lions softball

Southland tournament champion

NCAA Baton Rouge Regional
- Conference: Southland Conference
- Record: 50–16 (21–6 Southland)
- Head coach: Rick Fremin (10th season)
- Assistant coaches: Katie Godwin; Alana Fremin
- Home stadium: North Oak Park

2025 Southland Conference softball standings
	Conf.				Overall
Team	W		L	PCT	W		L	PCT
McNeese State ‍†‍‍	23	–	4	.852	41	–	20	.672
Southeastern Louisiana ‍‍‡‍^{y}	21	–	6	.778	50	–	16	.758
Nicholls ‍‍‍	19	–	8	.704	31	–	24	.564
Incarnate Word ‍‍‍	17	–	10	.630	29	–	21	.580
Lamar ‍‍‍	15	–	12	.556	29	–	27	.518
Stephen F. Austin ‍‍‍	14	–	13	.519	27	–	29	.482
Houston Christian ‍‍‍	10	–	17	.370	17	–	33	.340
Texas A&M–Corpus Christi ‍‍‍	6	–	21	.222	12	–	36	.250
East Texas A&M ‍‍‍	6	–	21	.222	10	–	42	.192
Northwestern State ‍‍‍	4	–	23	.148	7	–	43	.140
† – Conference champion ‡ – Tournament champion y – Invited to the NCAA tournament As of May 18, 2025; Rankings from NFCA/USA Today

The 2025 Southeastern Louisiana Lady Lions softball team represents Southeastern Louisiana University during the 2025 NCAA Division I softball season. The Lady Lions play their home games at North Oak Park in Hammond, LA and are led by 10th-year head coach Rick Fremin. They are members of the Southland Conference.

== Preseason ==
=== Southland Conference Coaches Poll ===
The Southland Conference Coaches Poll was released on January 30, 2025. Southeastern Louisiana was picked to finish first in the Southland Conference with 152 votes and nine first place votes.

Coaches poll
Predicted finish	Team	Votes (1st place)
1	Southeastern Louisiana	152 (9)
2	McNeese	151 (9)
3	Incarnate Word	130 (2)
4	Nicholls	106
5	Lamar	95
6	Texas A&M–Corpus Christi	70
7	Houston Christian	68
8	Stephen F. Austin	62
9	Northwestern State	48
9	East Texas A&M	20

==== Preseason All-Southland team ====
Chloe Magee was named to the conference preseason first team. Maddie Watson, Maria Detillier and Shenita Tucker were named as conference preseason second team members.

===== First Team =====
- Monee Montilla (TAMUCC, SR, 1st Base)
- Ryleigh Mata* (UIW, SR, 2nd Base)
- Chloe Magee (SELU, SO, Shortstop)
- Rylie Bouvier* (MCNS, SR, 3rd Base)
- Riley Rutherford (NICH, SR, Catcher)
- Victoria Altamirano* (UIW, JR, Utility)
- Aubrey Brown (LU, SO, Designated Player)
- Reagan Heflin* (NICH, JR, Outfielder)
- Alexis Dibbley* (MCNS, SO, Outfielder)
- Jillian Gutierrez* (UIW, JR, Outfielder)
- Ryann Schexnayder (MCNS, JR, Pitcher)
- Emma Wardlaw (LU, SO, Pitcher)

*-2024 Southland All-Conference Selection

===== Second Team =====
- Maddie Watson (SELU, SR, 1st Base)
- Jayne Sepulveda (LU, SR, 2nd Base)
- Baylee Lemons* (UIW, SR, Shortstop)
- Maria Detillier (SELU, JR, 3rd Base)
- Makenzie Wright (LU, SO, Catcher)
- Haylie Savage* (HCU, SR, Utility)
- Karlie Barba (HCU, JR, Designated Player)
- Samantha Mundine (MCNS, SO, Outfielder)
- AB Garcia (HCU, JR, Outfielder)
- Shenita Tucker (SELU, SR, Outfielder)
- Averi Paden (NICH, JR, Pitcher)
- Molly Yoo (NICH, JR, Pitcher)

*-2024 Southland All-Conference Selection

== Personnel ==
2025 Southeastern Louisiana Lady Lions softball team
Players
Coaches

#	Pos.	Name	Bats/throws	Height	Year	Home town
00	OF	Brilee Broussard	/	5 ft 4 in (1.63 m)	Sr	Tickfaw, Louisiana
1	P	Allison Brunson	/	5 ft 8 in (1.73 m)	Sr	Jena, Louisiana
2	P	Britney Lewinski	/	5 ft 6 in (1.68 m)	Sr	Shorewood, Illinois
3	OF	Addison Contorno	/	5 ft 3 in (1.6 m)	So	Livingston, Louisiana
4	OF	Shenita Tucker	/	5 ft 0 in (1.52 m)	Sr	Richmond, Texas
5	INF	Mykail Lusco	/	5 ft 8 in (1.73 m)	So	Harahan, Louisiana
6	P	Lainee Bailey	/	5 ft 8 in (1.73 m)	Jr	Walker, Louisiana
7	INF	Maddie Watson	/	5 ft 6 in (1.68 m)	Sr	Baton Rouge, Louisiana
8	OF	Maddie Leal (redshirt)	/	5 ft 9 in (1.75 m)	Sr	Houston, Texas
9	P	Macie LaRue	/	5 ft 5 in (1.65 m)	Jr	Lovelady, Texas
10	INF	Shelby Morris	/	5 ft 7 in (1.7 m)	Fr	Clinton, Louisiana
11	P	Hallie Burns (redshirt)	/	5 ft 3 in (1.6 m)	Fr	Booneville, Mississippi
12	INF	Brilee Ford	/	5 ft 5 in (1.65 m)	So	Albany, Louisiana
13	INF	Maria Detillier	/	5 ft 5 in (1.65 m)	Jr	Gramercy, Louisiana
14	C	Cydnee Schneider	/	5 ft 10 in (1.78 m)	Jr	Elkhorn, Nebraska
15	OF	Kailey Dixon	/	5 ft 3 in (1.6 m)	Jr	Hazard, Kentucky
16	INF	Chloe Magee	/	5 ft 8 in (1.73 m)	So	Watson, Louisiana
17	P	Celia Lamkin	/	5 ft 6 in (1.68 m)	Fr	Paris, Tennessee
18	U	Gabby Mitchell (redshirt)	/	5 ft 8 in (1.73 m)	Fr	Eunice, Louisiana
19	C	Aniya Harris	/	5 ft 8 in (1.73 m)	Fr	Violet, Texas
20	INF	Feline Poot	/	6 ft 0 in (1.83 m)	Sr	Almere, Netherlands
22	C	Blair Walsh	/	5 ft 10 in (1.78 m)	So	Centreville, Mississippi
24	P	Leah Marshall (redshirt)	/	5 ft 11 in (1.8 m)	Jr	Mississauga, Canada
25	OF	Breanna Fontenot (redshirt)	/	5 ft 3 in (1.6 m)	Fr	Moss Bluff, Louisiana
26	OF	Colleen Kulivan	/	5 ft 7 in (1.7 m)	Jr	Covington, Louisiana
28	C	Nadia Chernich	/	5 ft 2 in (1.57 m)	Fr	North Pole, Alaska
30	P	Olivia Henry	/	5 ft 6 in (1.68 m)	Fr	Deville, Louisiana
31	OF	Ariel Gomez	/	5 ft 5 in (1.65 m)	Sr	Spring, Texas

Head coach

Rick Fremin (Jackson State)

Assistant coach(es)

Katie Godwin (Southeastern Louisiana)
Alana Fremin (Belhaven)

Legend

- (C) Team captain
- (S) Suspended
- (I) Ineligible
- Injured
- Current redshirt

Roster
Last update: February 27, 2025

== Schedule and results ==
Legend
	Southeastern Louisiana win
	Southeastern Louisiana loss
	Postponement/Cancellation
**Bold**	Southeastern Louisiana team member
*	Non-Conference game
†	Make-Up Game

2025 Southeastern Louisiana Lady Lions softball game log (50–16)
Regular season (43–13)

February (13–6)
Date	Opponent	Rank	Site/stadium	Score	Win	Loss	Save	TV	Attendance	Overall record	SLC record
2025 Tiger Classic
Feb. 7	vs. Charlotte*		Tiger Park • Baton Rouge, LA	1–5	Brooke Bowling (1–0)	**Burns, Hallie** (0–1)	None		213	0–1	
Feb. 7	vs. Central Arkansas*		Tiger Park • Baton Rouge, LA	2–5	Julia Petty (1–0)	**Lewinski, Britney** (0–1)	None		542	0–2	
Feb. 8	vs. Charlotte*		Tiger Park • Baton Rouge, LA	10–1^{(5)}	**LaRue, Macie** (1–0)	Abby Gawlinski (0–1)	None		191	1–2	
Feb. 9	vs. Central Arkansas*		Tiger Park • Baton Rouge, LA	5–0	**LaRue, Macie** (2–0)	Bailie Runner (0–3)	None		360	2–2	
Feb. 9	at No. 10 LSU*		Tiger Park • Baton Rouge, LA	2–3	Sydney Berzon (2–0)	**Burns, Hallie** (0–2)	None	SECN+	1,376	2–3	
Feb. 12	Louisiana Tech*		North Oak Park • Hammond, LA	Game canceled							
2025 Lion Classic
Feb. 14	UTSA*		North Park • Hammond, LA	5–0	**LaRue, Macie** (3–0)	Madison Collins (0–1)	None		186	3–3	
Feb. 14	Mississippi Valley State*		North Park • Hammond, LA	12–0^{(5)}	**Bailey, Lainee** (1–0)	Ashtyn Clark (0–1)	None		186	4–3	
Feb. 15	Mississippi Valley State*		North Park • Hammond, LA	10–0^{(5)}	**Lamkin, Celia** (1–0)	Karis Robinson (0-0)	None		154	5–3	
Feb. 15	South Dakota*		North Park • Hammond, LA	7–3	**Burns, Hallie** (1–2)	Campbell German (0-0)	None		186	6–3	
Feb. 16	South Dakota*		North Park • Hammond, LA	11–6	**Burns, Hallie** (2-2)	Clara Edwards (3–2)	None		186	7–3	
Feb. 16	UTSA*		North Park • Hammond, LA	4–0	**Lewinski, Britney** (1-1)	Katia Reyes (2–1)	None		186	8–3	
Feb. 19	at South Alabama*		Jaguar Field • Mobile, AL	13–2	**Burns, Hallie** (3–2)	Ryley Harrison (3–2)	**Lewinski, Britney** (1)	ESPN+	383	9–3	
2025 JoAnne Graf Classic
Feb. 21	at No. 8 Florida State*		JoAnne Graf Field • Tallahassee, FL	0–5	Julia Apsel (2–0)	**Bailey, Lainee** (1-1)	Jazzy Francik (2)	ACCNX		9–4	
Feb. 21	at No. 8 Florida State*		JoAnne Graf Field • Tallahassee, FL	4–5 (9 inn)	Ashtyn Danley (3–1)	**Lewinski, Britney** (1–2)	None	ACCNX	827	9–5	
Feb. 22	vs. Florida A&M*		JoAnne Graf Field • Tallahassee, FL	3–2 (9 inn)	**Lewinski, Britney** (2-2)	Zoryana Hughes (2-2)	None			10–5	
Feb. 22	vs. Florida A&M*		JoAnne Graf Field • Tallahassee, FL	15–0 (5 inn)	**Bailey, Lainee** (2–1)	Amari Brown (1–2)	None			11–5	
Feb. 23	vs. No. 6 Texas A&M*		JoAnne Graf Field • Tallahassee, FL	2–3	Emiley Kennedy (5–1)	**Lewinski, Britney** (2–3)	None		103	11–6	
2025 Mardi Gras Mambo
Feb. 28	vs. Maine*		Youngsville Sports Complex • Youngsville, LA	6–1	**LaRue, Macie (4–0)**	Rieth, Alysen (0–5)	None		138	12–6	
Feb. 28	vs. Iowa State*		Youngsville Sports Complex • Youngsville, LA	9–3	**Burns, Hallie (4–2)**	Huhn, Abby (1-1)	None		159	13–6	

March (16–2)
Date	Opponent	Rank	Site/stadium	Score	Win	Loss	Save	TV	Attendance	Overall record	SLC record
2025 Mardi Gras Mambo (continued)
Mar. 1	vs. West Georgia*		Youngsville Sports Complex • Youngsville, LA	2–0	**Lewinski, Britney (3-3)**	Calli Hardison (1–4)	None		135	14–6	
Mar. 1	vs. Army*		Youngsville Sports Complex • Youngsville, LA	5–0	**LaRue, Macie (5–0)**	Eaglin, A. (2–4)			136	15–6	
Mar. 2	vs. Monmouth*		Youngsville Sports Complex • Youngsville, LA	13–0^{5}	**Lamkin, Celia (2–0)**	Cadena, Jayla (2–4)	None		129	16–6	
Mar. 5	at Southern Miss*		Southern Miss Softball Complex • Hattiesburg, MS	2–6	Jana Lee (4-4)	**Lewinski, Britney (3–4)**	None	ESPN+	781	16–7	
Mar. 7	East Texas A&M		North Park • Hammond, LA	7–2	**LaRue, Macie (6–0)**	Sanchez, Julia (1–8)	None	ESPN+	212	17–7	1–0
Mar. 7	East Texas A&M		North Park • Hammond, LA	10–0^{(5)}	**Burns, Hallie (5–2)**	Muller, Maddie (1–10)	None	ESPN+	212	18–7	2–0
Mar. 8	East Texas A&M		North Park • Hammond, LA	10–2^{(6)}	**LaRue, Macie (7–0)**	Sanchez, Julia (1–9)	None	ESPN+	154	19–7	3–0
Mar. 11	North Dakota State*		North Park • Hammond, LA	3–1	**Burns, Hallie (6–2)**	Addie Bowers (2–5)	None	ESPN+	220	20–7	
Mar. 14	at Houston Christian		Husky Field • Houston, TX	6–4	**Burns, Hallie (7–2)**	Pitman, Cara (3–2)	None		204	21–7	4–0
Mar. 14	at Houston Christian		Husky Field • Houston, TX	13–4	**Burns, Hallie (8–2)**	Evans, Kynleigh (2–5)	None		204	22–7	5–0
Mar. 15	at Houston Christian		Husky Field • Houston, TX	3–6	Pitman, Cara (4–2)	**Burns, Hallie (8–3)**	None	ESPN+	250	22–8	5–1
Mar. 19	Louisiana–Monroe*		North Park • Hammond, LA	5–2	**LaRue, Macie (8–0)**	Nichols, Maddie (7–4)	**Lewinski, Britney (2)**	ESPN+	208	23–8	
Mar. 21	at Northwestern State		Lady Demon Diamond • Natchitoches, LA	4–3	**LaRue, Macie (9–0)**	Stohler, Brooklynn (2–16)	**Lewinski, Britney (3)**	ESPN+	205	24–8	6–1
Mar. 21	at Northwestern State		Lady Demon Diamond • Natchitoches, LA	7–5	**Lewinski, Britney (4-4)**	Chandler, Kaymie (0–5)	None	ESPN+	202	25–8	7–1
Mar. 22	at Northwestern State		Lady Demon Diamond • Natchitoches, LA	9–1^{(6)}	**LaRue, Macie (10–0)**	Stohler, Brooklynn (2–17)	None	ESPN+	178	26–8	8–1
Mar. 27	Texas A&M–Corpus Christi		North Park • Hammond, LA	9–1^{(5)}	**LaRue, Macie (11–0)**	Williams, Malia (4–7)	None	ESPN+	223	27–8	9–1
Mar. 27	Texas A&M–Corpus Christi		North Park • Hammond, LA	5–2	**Burns, Hallie (9–3)**	Winfrey, Kendra (4–6)	None	ESPN+	223	28–8	10–1
Mar. 28	Texas A&M–Corpus Christi		North Park • Hammond, LA	5–0	**Lewinski, Britney (5–4)**	Galvan, Siarah (0–3)	None	ESPN+	186	29–8	11–1

April (14–5)
Date	Opponent	Rank	Site/stadium	Score	Win	Loss	Save	TV	Attendance	Overall record	SLC record
Apr. 1	at Jackson State*		JSU Softball Field • Jackson, MS	11–0^{(5)}	**LaRue, Macie (12–0)**	Gonzalez, Sofia (6–5)	None		100	30–8	
Apr. 1	at Jackson State*		JSU Softball Field • Jackson, MS	12–0^{(6)}	**Burns, Hallie (10–3)**	Gant, Jorgina (5–4)	None		100	31–8	
Apr. 4	McNeese		North Park • Hammond, LA	9–1^{(5)}	**LaRue, Macie (13–0)**	Williams, Kadence (6–7)	None	ESPN+	157	32–8	12–1
Apr. 4	McNeese		North Park • Hammond, LA	4–7	Taylor, Maddie (10–6)	**Burns, Hallie (10–4)**		ESPN+	157	32–9	12–2
Apr. 5	McNeese		North Park • Hammond, LA	4–5	Taylor, Maddie (11–6)	**LaRue, Macie (13–1)**		ESPN+	232	32–10	12–3
Apr. 8	at Lamar		Lamar Softball Complex • Beaumont, TX	3–5	R. Smith (7–6)	**Brunson, Allison (0–1)**	M. Pitre (3)	ESPN+	302	32–11	12–4
Apr. 8	at Lamar		Lamar Softball Complex • Beaumont, TX	2–1	**Burns, Hallie (11–4)**	M. Pitre (6–2)	None	ESPN+	450	33–11	13–4
Apr. 9	at Lamar		Lamar Softball Complex • Beaumont, TX	3–2	**LaRue, Macie (14–1)**	M. Pitre (6–3)	None	ESPN+	437	34–11	14–4
Apr. 11	Stephen F. Austin		North Park • Hammond, LA	8–3	**Lewinski, Britney (6–4)**	Alexis Telford (8–4)	None	ESPN+	232	35–11	15–4
Apr. 11	Stephen F. Austin		North Park • Hammond, LA	11–3	**LaRue, Macie (15–1)**	Brooke Gainous (3–9)	None	ESPN+	232	36–11	16–4
Apr. 12	Stephen F. Austin		North Park • Hammond, LA	4–0	**Lewinski, Britney (7–4)**	Reagan Hall (6-6)	None	ESPN+	276	37–11	17–4
Apr. 17	at Incarnate Word		H-E-B Field • San Antonio, TX	4–2	**LaRe, Macie (16–1)**	Larissa Jacquez (8–6)	None	ESPN+	117	38–11	18–4
Apr. 18	at Incarnate Word		H-E-B Field • San Antonio, TX	6–4	**LaRue, Macie (17–1)**	Samantha Portillo (7–6)	None	ESPN+	130	39–11	19–4
Apr. 18	at Incarnate Word		H-E-B Field • San Antonio, TX	6–3	**Lewinski, Britney (8–4)**	Larissa Jacquez (7–8)	None	ESPN+	215	40–11	20–4
Apr. 22	Alcorn State*		North Park • Hammond, LA	8–0	**Brunson, Allison (1–1)**	Ta'Niyah Fletcher (9–14)	None	ESPN+	151	41–11	
Apr. 22	Alcorn State*		North Park • Hammond, LA	8–0	**Bailey, Lainee (3–1)**	Alainah Felton (0–7)	None	ESPN+	151	42–11	
Apr. 25	Nicholls		North Park • Hammond, LA	7–9	Averi Paden (9–6)	**LaRue, Macie (17–2)**	None	ESPN+	151	42–12	20–5
Apr. 26	Nicholls		North Park • Hammond, LA	5–3	**Bailey, Lainee (4–1)**	Molly VandenBout (5–6)	**Lewinski, Britney (4)**	ESPN+	151	43–12	21–5
Apr. 26	Nicholls		North Park • Hammond, LA	2–4	Averi Paden (10–6)	**Burns, Hallie (11–5)**	Sierra Ouellette (1)	ESPN+	151	43–13	21–6

Post-season (7–3)

Southland Tournament (5–1)
Date	Opponent	(Seed)/Rank	Site/stadium	Score	Win	Loss	Save	TV	Attendance	Overall record	Tournament record
May 1	(7) Houston Christian	(2)	North Park • Hammond, LA	4–3	**Burns, Hallie (12–5)**	Cara Pitman (9–10)	**Lewinski, Britney (5)**	ESPN+	258	44–13	1–0
May 2	(6) Stephen F. Austin	(2)	North Park • Hammond, LA	7–3	**LaRue, Macie (18–2)**	Alexis Telford (11–8)	None	ESPN+	208	45–13	2–0
May 3	(3) Nicholls	(2)	North Park • Hammond, LA	4–3	**LaRue, Macie (19–2)**	Averi Paden (10–7)	None	ESPN+	241	46–13	3–0
May 8	at (1) McNeese	(2)	Joe Miller Field at Cowgirl Diamond • Lake Charles, LA	2–3	Maddie Taylor (17–7)	**Lewinski, Britney (8–5)**	None	ESPN+	466	46–14	3–1
May 9	at (1) McNeese	(2)	Joe Miller Field at Cowgirl Diamond • Lake Charles, LA	2–0	**Bailey, Lainee (5–1)**	Kadence Williams (11–8)	None	ESPN+	589	47–14	4–1
May 10	at (1) McNeese	(2)	Joe Miller Field at Cowgirl Diamond • Lake Charles, LA	6–5	**Lewinski, Britney (9–5)**	Ryann Schexnayder (7–2)	None	ESPN+	589	48–14	5–1

NCAA Tournament (2–2)
Date	Opponent	(Seed)/Rank	Site/stadium	Score	Win	Loss	Save	TV	Attendance	Overall record	Tournament record
May 16	at No. 10 LSU		Tiger Park • Baton Rouge, LA	4–3	**Bailey, Lainee (6–1)**	Jayden Heavener (13–5)	None	SECN	2,563	49–14	1–0
May 17	vs. No. 19 Nebraska		Tiger Park • Baton Rouge, LA	1–14	Jordy Bahl (24–6)	**Burns, Hallie (12–6)**	None	ESPN+	2,397	49–15	1–1
May 17	at No. 10 LSU		Tiger Park • Baton Rouge, LA	8–7	**Lewinski, Britney (10–5)**	Sydney Berzon (18–8)	None	ESPN+	2,390	50–15	2–1
May 18	vs. No. 19 Nebraska		Tiger Park • Baton Rouge, LA	0–8	Jordy Bahl (25–6)	**LaRue, Macie (19–3)**	None	ESPN+	2,555	50–16	2–2

Schedule source:*Rankings are based on the team's current ranking in the NFCA/USA Softball poll.

== Conference awards and honors ==
=== Post-season All-Southland Conference Teams ===
Player of the Year: Victoria Altamirano, Incarnate Word

Hitter of the Year: Victoria Altamirano, Incarnate Word

Pitcher of the Year: Maddie Taylor, McNeese

Freshman of the Year: Kassidy Chance, McNeese

Newcomer of the Year: Macie LaRue, Southeastern Louisiana

Coach of the Year: James Landreneau, McNeese

==== First Team ====
- Victoria Altamirano (UIW, JR, 1st Base)
- Claire Sisco (NICH, JR, 2nd Base)
- Chloe Magee (SLU, SO, Shortstop)
- Maria Detillier (SLU, JR, 3rd Base)
- Sarah Allen (McN, FR, Catcher)
- Kassidy Chance (McN, FR, Utility)
- Veronica Harrison (LU, SO, Designated Player)
- Shenita Tucker (SLU, SR, Outfielder)
- Samantha Mundine (McN, SO, Outfielder)
- AB Garcia (HCU, JR, Outfielder)
- Macie LaRue (SLU, JR, Pitcher)
- Maddie Taylor (McN, FR, Pitcher)

==== Second Team ====
- Tatum Wright (ETAM, JR, 1st Base)
- Ellie Vance (SFA, SR, 2nd Base)
- Reese Reyna (McN, SR, Shortstop)
- Haylie Savage (HCU, SR, 3rd Base)
- Adelynn Bacerra (SFA, JR, Catcher)
- Molly VandenBout (NICH, SR, Utility)
- Kyi'Marri Ester (SFA, SO, Designated Player)
- Reagan Heflin (NICH, JR, Outfield)
- Maddie Cason (ETAM, GR, Outfield)
- Nyjah Fontenot (McN, SO-R, Outfield)
- Larissa Jacquez (UIW, SO, Pitcher)
- Britney Lewinski (SLU, SR, Pitcher)

==== All Defensive ====
- Cala Wilson (LU, FR, 1st Base)
- Claire Sisco (NICH, JR, 2nd Base)
- Reese Reyna (McN, SR, Shortstop)
- Trinity Brandon (LU, JR, 3rd Base)
- Jaisy Caceres (UIW, SO, Catcher)
- Reagan Heflin (NICH, JR, Right Field)
- Sophia Livers (NWST, SO, Center Field)
- Maddy Bailey (HCU, SR, Left Field)
- Maddie Taylor (McN, FR, Pitcher)

=== Weekly awards ===
Weekly honors
Honors	Player	Position	Date Awarded	Ref.
SLC Softball Pitcher of the week	Macie LaRue	RHP	February 10, 2025	
SLC Softball Hitter of the week	Maria Detillier	INF	March 3, 2025	
SLC Softball Pitcher of the week	Macie LaRue	RHP	March 11, 2025	
SLC Softball Pitcher of the week	Hallie Burns	RHP	March 31, 2025	

== See also ==
- 2025 Southeastern Louisiana Lions baseball team
