= Grand Canyon Antelopes softball =

NCAA Division I softball team

- Founded: 2004; 22 years ago
- University: Grand Canyon University
- Head coach: Shanon Hays (1st season)
- Conference: Mountain West
- Location: Phoenix, Arizona, US
- Home stadium: GCU Softball Stadium (capacity: 1,200)
- Nickname: Lopes
- Colors: Purple, black, and white

NCAA Tournament appearances
- 2022, 2023, 2024, 2025, 2026

Conference tournament championships
- WAC: 2022, 2023, 2024, 2025; MW: 2026

Regular-season conference championships
- WAC: 2014, 2017, 2022, 2024, 2025; MW: 2026

The Grand Canyon Antelopes softball is the team that represents Grand Canyon University in NCAA Division I college softball. The team currently participates in the Mountain West Conference. The Lopes are currently led by their head coach Shanon Hays. The team play their home games at GCU Softball Stadium which is located on the university's campus.

== History ==
In 2002, GCU announced it would start a softball program that would compete in the 2004 season. On November 18, 2002, it announced the hiring of Arizona State assistant coach Ann Pedersen as its first head coach.

GCU qualified for the NCAA Tournament three times at the Division II level (2010, 2012, 2013).

The Lopes won the Western Athletic Conference regular-season championship in their first year (2014) at the Division I level. GCU also won the regular-season title in 2017.

GCU and Ann Pierson parted ways on May 20, 2021, after the program posted back-to-back losing seasons for the first time since 2008.

Shanon Hays was hired as the program's second head coach on June 11, 2021. In Hays' first season, he brought in 15 newcomers and led Grand Canyon to its third WAC regular-season title, first WAC Tournament title and first NCAA Tournament appearance.

=== Conference membership (Division I only) ===
- 2014–2025: Western Athletic Conference
- 2026– : Mountain West Conference

=== Coaching history ===
Years	Coach	Record	%
2004–2021	Ann Pierson	511–416–3	.551
2022–present	Shanon Hays	183–50	.785

== GCU Softball Stadium ==
GCU Softball Stadium is a softball stadium on the Grand Canyon campus in Phoenix, Arizona that seats 1,200 people. The new artificial turf playing surface was used in the 2017 season while a permanent stadium was built around it and opened on February 8, 2018.

GCU Softball Stadium replaced Stapleton-Pierson Stadium as the primary venue for the program.

== Year-by-year NCAA Division I results ==
Record table
Season	Coach	Overall	Conference	Standing	Postseason
Grand Canyon (Western Athletic Conference) (2014–2025)
2014	Ann Pierson	27-21	12-3	1st	
2015	Ann Pierson	28-22	9-6	2nd	
2016	Ann Pierson	35-15	10-5	2nd	
2017	Ann Pierson	36-18	11-4	t-1st	
2018	Ann Pierson	31-28	8-6	4th	
2019	Ann Pierson	33-24	12-6	t-2nd	
2020	Ann Pierson	7-20	0-0	--	
2021	Ann Pierson	19-30	8-9	3rd	
2022	Shanon Hays	39-16	19-5	1st	NCAA Regional
2023	Shanon Hays	47-13	17-7	2nd	NCAA Regional
2024	Shanon Hays	50-13	23-3	1st	NCAA Regional
2025	Shanon Hays	47-8	21-2	1st	NCAA Regional
Total:		399-228	150-56		
National champion Postseason invitational champion Conference regular season champion Conference regular season and conference tournament champion Division regular season champion Division regular season and conference tournament champion Conference tournament champion

== See also ==
- List of NCAA Division I softball programs
