= Shanon Hays =

American softball coach (born 1968)

Current position
- Title: Head coach
- Team: Grand Canyon
- Conference: Mountain West
- Record: 183–50 (.785)

Biographical details
- Born: February 12, 1968 (age 58)

Playing career

Baseball
- 1988–1990: Texas Tech

Coaching career (HC unless noted)

Men's basketball
- 1995–1996: Frank Phillips
- 1996–99: Abilene Christian
- 1999–2001: Texas Tech (Assistant)
- 2003–2004: Midland College
- 2004–2006: Houston (Assistant)

Softball
- 2006–2009: Lubbock Christian
- 2010–2014: Texas Tech
- 2016–2018: Colorado Christian
- 2019–2021: Oklahoma Christian
- 2022–: Grand Canyon (softball)

Head coaching record
- Overall: 651–230–5 (.738) (softball); 58–26–0 (.690) (basketball)

Accomplishments and honors

Championships
- 3× WAC regular season (2022, 2024, 2025); 4× WAC Tournament (2022, 2023, 2024, 2025); 1× Mountain West regular season (2026); 1× MW Tournament (2026)

Awards
- 3× WAC Coach of the Year (2022, 2024, 2025); 1× MW Coach of the Year (2026)

Records
- Most wins by a coach at Texas Tech (186)

Shanon Hays (born February 12, 1968) is an American softball coach for the Grand Canyon Antelopes. Previously, he was the head coach at Texas Tech and remains the winningest coach in program history. He also has held several positions as a men's basketball coach and an athletic director.

== Early years ==
Hays played college baseball and basketball at Lubbock Christian University where he lettered in both sports in 1987. He transferred to Texas Tech where he played under his father Larry Hays.

== Coaching career ==
Hays began his coaching career as a graduate assistant at Texas Tech in 1991-92. He then held a pair of high school head coaching positions, first at Sundown High School in 1992-93 for boys basketball, then at Lubbock Christian High School in 1993-94 and 1994–95, leading both the baseball and boys basketball programs. At Lubbock Christian, he went 50-15 as the basketball coach and led the program to the private school state championship game. He led the baseball program to two state tournament appearances and played in the state championship game in his second season.

=== Basketball ===
Hays spent one season as the head coach at Frank Phillips College in the 1995-96 season. He inherited a 4-25 team and went 19-10 in his one season, earning Western Junior College Athletic Conference Coach of the Year honors.

Hays took the reins of the Abilene Christian Wildcats men's basketball program in 1996-97 and led the Wildcats for three seasons. He went 58-26 leading the program. Chris Beard was an assistant on his staff in his first season at Abilene Christian.

He left Abilene Christian in 1999 to join James Dickey's Texas Tech coaching staff for two seasons. He was not retained when Texas Tech hired Bob Knight in 2001.

After briefly leaving the coaching world for a career in pharmaceutical sales and then an athletic director post, Hays took over as the head coach of Midland College on April 16, 2003. He went 27-7 in his one season.

Hays returned to the Division I ranks as an assistant coach at Houston, hired by Tom Penders. He spent two seasons with the program in what would be his last position in men's basketball.

=== Softball ===
Hays' first opportunity in the softball coaching ranks came in 2006 where he started the softball program at Lubbock Christian University. He was named the head coach on October 24, 2006. In the program's inaugural season in 2008, they went 58-9-2 and claimed an NAIA National Championship.

Texas Tech named Hays its seventh softball head coach on June 8, 2009. He guided the Red Raiders for five seasons and remains the school's winningest coach. He resigned on May 13, 2014.

Hays took over as the head coach at Colorado Christian University on December 1, 2016, and spent three years leading the program.

He was named the head coach at Oklahoma Christian University in 2018 and guided the Eagles for three seasons.

==== Grand Canyon ====
Hays was named the head coach at Grand Canyon on June 11, 2021.

He wasted no time reviving the Lopes program, posting a 39-16 overall record, winning the WAC's regular-season and tournament championships, and leading the program to its first appearance in the NCAA Division I softball tournament.

Hays led the Lopes to tournament appearances again in 2023, 2024 and 2025. In 2023, GCU upset UCLA for the program's first NCAA tournament win. In 2024, GCU returned to Los Angeles and won two games in the NCAA tournament.

In 2025, Hays led GCU to the program's first top-25 ranking and back to the NCAA tournament, where it won one game against Santa Clara.

Following a fourth consecutive WAC Tournament Championship in 2025, the school announced Hays had signed a long-term extension which reportedly made him one of the nation's highest-paid coaches and highest in Arizona.

Hays made GCU's step up in competition to the Mountain West Conference look easy. In 2026, GCU won the conference's regular-season championship by three games and won the MW Championship with a dramatic comeback win against host Nevada.

== Athletic administration ==
At age 34, Hays became the athletic director at Abilene Christian University on June 1, 2002. After less than a year in the post, he resigned, citing that "coaching is in my blood, and it's been hard to be away from it."

== Softball head coaching record ==
The following table lists Hays' softball head coaching record at the NCAA level.

Record table
Season	Team	Overall	Conference	Standing	Postseason
Texas Tech (Big 12 Conference) (2010–2014)
2010	Texas Tech	38-18	7-11	t-6th	NCAA Regional
2011	Texas Tech	42-16	5-13	8th	NCAA Regional
2012	Texas Tech	41-17	13-10	5th	NCAA Regional
2013	Texas Tech	30-26	4-14	t-6th	
2014	Texas Tech	35-19	8-10	4th	
Texas Tech:		186–96–0 (.660)	37–58 (.389)		
Colorado Christian (Rocky Mountain Athletic Conference) (2017–2018)
2017	Colorado Christian	29-23	17-15	6th	
2018	Colorado Christian	43-15	30-8	2nd	NCAA Regional
Colorado Christian:		72–38 (.655)	47–23 (.671)		
Oklahoma Christian (Heartland) (2019–2019)
2019	Oklahoma Christian	40-16	19-11	t-1st	NCAA Regional
Oklahoma Christian (Lone Star Conference) (2020–2021)
2020	Oklahoma Christian	21-5	6-2	--	--
2021	Oklahoma Christian	38-9	26-4	2nd	NCAA Regional
Oklahoma Christian:		99–30 (.767)	51–17 (.750)		
Grand Canyon (Western Athletic Conference) (2022–pres.)
2022	Grand Canyon	39-16	19-5	1st	NCAA Regional
2023	Grand Canyon	47-13	17-7	2nd	NCAA Regional
2024	Grand Canyon	50-13	23-3	1st	NCAA Regional
2025	Grand Canyon	47-8	21-2	1st	NCAA Regional
Grand Canyon:		183–50 (.785)	80–17 (.825)		
Total:		540–214 (.716)			
National champion Postseason invitational champion Conference regular season champion Conference regular season and conference tournament champion Division regular season champion Division regular season and conference tournament champion Conference tournament champion
