= 2025 Big East Conference softball tournament =

- Teams: 6
- Format: Double-elimination tournament
- Finals site: Villanova Softball Complex; Villanova, Pennsylvania
- Champions: UConn (8th title)
- Winning coach: Laura Valentino (1st title)
- MVP: Payton Kinney (UConn)
- Television: FS1 and FS2

2025 Big East Conference softball standings
	Conf.						Overall
Team	W		L		T	PCT	W		L		T	PCT
St. John's ‍†‍‍	19	–	5	–	0	.792	39	–	17	–	1	.693
UConn ‍‍‡‍^{y}	18	–	6	–	0	.750	35	–	19	–	0	.648
Villanova ‍‍‍	15	–	9	–	0	.625	27	–	26	–	1	.509
Creighton ‍‍‍	15	–	9	–	0	.625	30	–	25	–	0	.545
Butler ‍‍‍	14	–	10	–	0	.583	26	–	22	–	0	.542
Providence ‍‍‍	11	–	13	–	0	.458	25	–	31	–	0	.446
Seton Hall ‍‍‍	11	–	13	–	0	.458	29	–	23	–	0	.558
DePaul ‍‍‍	3	–	21	–	0	.125	16	–	32	–	0	.333
Georgetown ‍‍‍	2	–	22	–	0	.083	11	–	32	–	0	.256
† – Conference champion ‡ – Tournament champion y – Invited to the NCAA Tournament; As of May 17, 2025; Rankings from NFCA/USA Today

The 2025 Big East Conference softball tournament was held at Villanova Softball Complex on the campus of the Villanova University in Villanova, Pennsylvania. The tournament ran May 7 through May 10, 2025 and determined the champion for the Big East Conference for the 2025 NCAA Division I softball season. UConn won the event to earn the Big East Conference's automatic bid to the 2025 NCAA Division I softball tournament. The semifinals and finals were broadcast on Fox Sports 1 and Fox Sports 2.

== Format and seeding ==
The top six teams from the conference's round-robin regular season will qualify for the tournament, and will be seeded one through six. They will play a double-elimination tournament, with the top two seeds receiving a single bye.

Team	W	L	Pct.	GB	Seed
St. John's	19	5	.792	—	1
UConn	18	6	.750	1	2
Villanova	15	9	.625	4	3
Creighton	15	9	.625	4	4
Butler	14	10	.583	5	5
Providence	11	13	.458	8	6
Seton Hall	11	13	.458	8	—
DePaul	3	21	.125	16	—
Georgetown	2	22	.083	17	—

== Tournament ==
Upper round 1	Upper round 2	Upper final	Final
1	St. John's	3
4	Creighton	6	4	Creighton	5
5	Butler	3	4	Creighton	1
2	UConn	12
2	UConn	5
3	Villanova	9	6	Providence	4
6	Providence	10^{8}
2	UConn	18^{5}
4	Creighton	4
Lower round 1	Lower round 2	Lower round 3	Lower final
4	Creighton	5
1	St. John's	0	6	Providence	4
6	Providence	7	6	Providence	10^{5}
5	Butler	13	5	Butler	0
3	Villanova	10

=== Game results ===
Date	Game	Winner	Score	Loser	Notes
May 7	Game 1	(4) Creighton	6–3	(5) Butler	
May 7	Game 2	(6) Providence	10–9 ^{8}	(3) Villanova	
May 7	Game 3	(5) Butler	13–10	(3) Villanova	Villanova eliminated
May 8	Game 4	(4) Creighton	5–3	(1) St. John's	
May 8	Game 5	(2) UConn	5–4	(6) Providence	
May 8	Game 6	(6) Providence	7–0	(5) Butler	Butler eliminated
May 9	Game 7	(2) UConn	12–1	(4) Creighton	
May 9	Game 8	(6) Providence	10–0 ^{5}	(1) St. John's	St. John's eliminated
May 10	Game 9	(4) Creighton	5–4	(6) Providence	Providence eliminated
May 10	Game 10	(2) UConn	18–4 ^{5}	(4) Creighton	UConn wins Big East Championship

== All-Tournament Team ==
The following players were named to the All-Tournament Team.

Player	Class	Position	School
Ava Franz	Sr.	SS	Villanova
Alyssa Twomey	So.	P	Providence
Ella White	Sr.	U	Butler
Sydra Seville	Sr.	OF	Creighton
Kenzie Schopfer	Sr.	P	Creighton
Lexi Hastings	Sr.	OF	UConn
Grace Jenkins	Jr.	C	UConn
Payton Kinney	Gr.	P	UConn*
Cat Petteys	Fr.	SS	UConn

=== Most Outstanding Player ===
Payton Kinney was named Tournament Most Outstanding Player. Kinney was a pitcher for UConn.
