= 2025 Big West Conference softball tournament =

College softball tournament in California

- Teams: 6
- Format: Double-elimination tournament
- Finals site: Anderson Family Field; Fullerton, California
- Champions: UC Santa Barbara (1st title)
- Winning coach: Jo Evans (1st title)
- MVP: Malaya Johnson (UC Santa Barbara)
- Television: ESPN+

2025 Big West Conference softball standings
	Conf.				Overall
Team	W		L	PCT	W		L	PCT
Cal State Fullerton ‍†‍‍	22	–	5	.815	37	–	17	.685
Cal State Northridge ‍‍‍	17	–	10	.630	26	–	26	.500
UC Santa Barbara ‍‍‡‍^{y}	17	–	10	.630	35	–	25	.583
Long Beach State ‍‍‍	17	–	10	.630	27	–	22	.551
Hawaii ‍‍‍	17	–	10	.630	33	–	20	.623
UC San Diego ‍‍‍	13	–	14	.481	16	–	32	.333
UC Riverside ‍‍‍	12	–	15	.444	21	–	29	.420
UC Davis ‍‍‍	9	–	18	.333	15	–	36	.294
Cal State Bakersfield ‍‍‍	7	–	20	.259	16	–	34	.320
Cal Poly ‍‍‍	4	–	23	.148	9	–	38	.191
† – Conference champion ‡ – Tournament champion y – Invited to the NCAA tournament As of May 17, 2025; Rankings from NFCA/USA Today

The 2025 Big West Conference softball tournament was held at Anderson Family Field on the campus of the California State University, Fullerton in Fullerton, California from May 7 through May 10, 2025 for the 2025 NCAA Division I softball season. The tournament was won by the UC Santa Barbara Gauchos, who earned the Big West Conference's automatic bid to the 2025 NCAA Division I softball tournament. That Gauchos team went on to the regional finals, their furthest tournament run in program history.

== Format and seeding ==
The top six finishers of the league's ten teams from the regular season qualified for the tournament. The top two seeds received a single bye, with the remaining teams playing opening round games.

== Tournament ==
=== Bracket ===
Upper round 1	Upper round 2	Upper final	Final
1	Cal State Fullerton	5
4	Long Beach State	8	5	Hawaii	11
5	Hawaii	10	5	Hawaii	3
2	Cal State Northridge	4
2	Cal State Northridge	4
3	UC Santa Barbara	4	6	UC San Diego	2
6	UC San Diego	6
2	Cal State Northridge	2	5
3	UC Santa Barbara	8	7
Lower round 1	Lower round 2	Lower round 3	Lower final
3	UC Santa Barbara	8
3	UC Santa Barbara	11	5	Hawaii	1
1	Cal State Fullerton	2	6	UC San Diego	7
3	UC Santa Barbara	8^{(6)}	3	UC Santa Barbara	6
4	Long Beach State	0

== All Tournament Team ==
Player	Position	Team
Isabella Alonso	RHP	Cal State Northridge
India Caldwell	RHP	UC San Diego
Lauryn Carranco	RHP	Cal State Northridge
**Malaya Johnson**	RHP	UC Santa Barbara
Delaina Ma'ae	C	UC Santa Barbara
Izabella Martinez	1B	Hawai'i
Jazzy Santos	2B	UC Santa Barbara
Lily Hermosillo	3B	UC San Diego
Jerzie Liana	SS	Cal State Northridge
Carly Robbins	INF	Long Beach State
Gizella Sandoval Vargas	INF	Cal State Northridge
Liliana Thomas	INF	Hawai'i
Giselle Mejia	OF	UC Santa Barbara

MVP in bold
