= 2025 Southern Conference softball tournament =

- Teams: 8
- Format: Double-elimination tournament
- Finals site: Hope Field; Spartanburg, South Carolina
- Champions: Mercer (1st title)
- Winning coach: Lindsay Fico (1st title)
- MVP: Grace Taylor (Mercer)
- Television: ESPN+

2025 Southern Conference softball standings
	Conf.				Overall
Team	W		L	PCT	W		L	PCT
Chattanooga ‍†‍‍	15	–	5	.750	41	–	15	.732
UNC Greensboro ‍‍‍	14	–	6	.700	39	–	18	.684
Samford ‍‍‍	12	–	7	.632	33	–	23	.589
Wofford ‍‍‍	11	–	8	.579	30	–	22	.577
Mercer ‍‍‡‍^{y}	11	–	9	.550	40	–	26	.606
Western Carolina ‍‍‍	6	–	14	.300	22	–	31	.415
East Tennessee State ‍‍‍	6	–	15	.286	18	–	37	.327
Furman ‍‍‍	5	–	16	.238	15	–	38	.283
† – Conference champion ‡ – Tournament champion y – Invited to the NCAA tournament As of May 18, 2025; Rankings from NFCA/USA Today

The 2025 Southern Conference softball tournament was held at Hope Field on the campus of the Wofford College in Spartanburg, South Carolina, from May 7 through May 10, 2025. The tournament was won by the Mercer Bears, who earned the Southern Conference's automatic bid to the 2025 NCAA Division I softball tournament.

== Tournament ==
=== Play-in round ===
Wednesday, May 7
Team	R
#8 Furman	7
#5 Mercer	11
Notes: Furman Eliminated

Wednesday, May 7
Team	R
#7 East Tennessee State	12
#6 Western Carolina	9
Notes: Western Carolina Eliminated

=== Bracket ===
Upper round 1
5	Mercer	5
4	Wofford	2
3	Samford	7
7	East Tennessee State	6
Lower round 1
5	Mercer	11
7	East Tennessee State	3
4	Wofford	1
2	UNC Greensboro	3

Upper round 2
1	Chattanooga	8^{(9)}
5	Mercer	7
2	UNC Greensboro	4
3	Samford	5
Lower round 2
5	Mercer	7
2	UNC Greensboro	3

Upper final
1	Chattanooga	8
3	Samford	3
Lower final
5	Mercer	13
3	Samford	5

Final
1	Chattanooga	5	2
5	Mercer	6	5

== All Tournament Team ==
Player	Team
**Grace Taylor**	Mercer
Tori Hedgecock	Mercer
Parris Wiggs	Mercer
KiKi Daniels	Mercer
Grace Jones	Mercer
Hannah Rivers	Mercer
Acelynn Sellers	Chattanooga
Peja Goold	Chattanooga
McKayla Cothran	Samford
Kaylyn Belfield	UNC Greensboro

MVP in bold
