= 2025 Southland Conference softball tournament =

- Teams: 8
- Format: Double-elimination
- Finals site: Joe Miller Field at Cowgirl Diamond; Lake Charles, Louisiana
- Champions: Southeastern Louisiana (2nd title)
- Winning coach: Rick Fremin (2nd title)
- MVP: Chloe Magee (Southeastern Louisiana)
- Television: ESPN+

2025 Southland Conference softball standings
	Conf.				Overall
Team	W		L	PCT	W		L	PCT
McNeese State ‍†‍‍	23	–	4	.852	41	–	20	.672
Southeastern Louisiana ‍‍‡‍^{y}	21	–	6	.778	48	–	14	.774
Nicholls ‍‍‍	19	–	8	.704	31	–	24	.564
Incarnate Word ‍‍‍	17	–	10	.630	29	–	21	.580
Lamar ‍‍‍	15	–	12	.556	29	–	27	.518
Stephen F. Austin ‍‍‍	14	–	13	.519	27	–	29	.482
Houston Christian ‍‍‍	10	–	17	.370	17	–	33	.340
Texas A&M–Corpus Christi ‍‍‍	6	–	21	.222	12	–	36	.250
East Texas A&M ‍‍‍	6	–	21	.222	10	–	42	.192
Northwestern State ‍‍‍	4	–	23	.148	7	–	43	.140
† – Conference champion ‡ – Tournament champion y – Invited to the NCAA tournament As of May 10, 2025; Rankings from NFCA/USA Today

The 2025 Southland Conference softball tournament was held from May 1 through 4 and May 8 to 10. As the tournament winner, Southeastern Louisiana earned the Southland Conference's automatic bid to the 2025 NCAA Division I softball tournament.

== Seeding and format ==
The tournament format was the same as used in the conference 2022 and 2025 baseball tournaments. The top eight finishers from the regular season were seeded one through eight, and played a two bracket, double-elimination tournament. The bracket winners moved to the championship series to be held at the home field of the highest remaining seeded team. Teams were seeded by record within the conference with a tie–breaker system to seed teams with identical conference records. The top eight teams in the conference qualified for the tournament.

Seed	School	Conference	Tie-breaker #1	Tie-breaker #2
1	McNeese State	23–4	Not needed	
2	Southeastern Louisiana	21–6	Not needed	
3	Nicholls	19–8	Not needed	
4	Incarnate Word	17–10		
5	Lamar	15–12		
6	Stephen F. Austin	14–13		
7	Houston Christian	10–17		
8	East Texas A&M	6–21		

Northwestern State failed to qualify. New Orleans and UT Rio Grande Valley do not sponsor a softball team.

== Tournament ==
First round	Quarterfinals
4	Incarnate Word	4
5	Lamar	0
4	Incarnate Word	3
1	McNeese	4
1	McNeese State	5^{8}
8	East Texas A&M	4
Group 1
5	Lamar	6
8	East Texas A&M	5
5	Lamar	2
4	Incarnate Word	10^{5}
3	Nicholls	4
6	Stephen F. Austin	7
6	Stephen F. Austin	3
2	Southeastern Louisiana	7
2	Southeastern Louisiana	4
7	Houston Christian	3
Group 2
3	Nicholls	4
7	Houston Christian	0
3	Nicholls	11^{5}
6	Stephen F. Austin	1

Semifinals
1	McNeese	3
4	Incarnate Word	1
2	Southeastern Louisiana	4
3	Nicholls	3

Finals
1	McNeese	3	0	5
2	Southeastern Louisiana	2	2	6

== Awards and honors ==
Tournament MVP: Chloe Magee, Southeastern Louisiana

All-Tournament Teams: Source:

Chloe Magee, Southeastern Louisiana - MVP
Victoria Altamirano, Incarnate Word
Molly Vandenbout, Nicholls
Rylie Bouvier, McNeese
Reese Reyna, McNeese
Sam Mundine, McNeese
Maddie Taylor, McNeese
Brilee Ford, Southeastern Louisiana
Cydnee Schneider, Southeastern Louisiana
Maria Detillier, Southeastern Louisiana
Macie LaRue, Southeastern Louisiana
Lainee Bailey, Southeastern Louisiana

== See also ==
2025 Southland Conference baseball tournament
