= 2025 Summit League softball tournament =

- Teams: 6
- Format: Double-elimination
- Finals site: Jerald T. Moriarty Field; Brookings, South Dakota
- Champions: Omaha (3rd title)
- Runner-up: South Dakota (3rd title game)
- Winning coach: Mike Heard (3rd title)
- MVP: Katherine Johnson (Omaha)
- Attendance: 1,744
- Television: MidcoSN, Summit League Network

2025 Summit League softball standings
	Conf.				Overall
Team	W		L	PCT	W		L	PCT
Omaha ‍†‍‡‍^{y}	14	–	4	.778	40	–	13	.755
St. Thomas* ‍†‍‍	14	–	4	.778	33	–	17	.660
South Dakota State ‍‍‍	13	–	5	.722	29	–	26	.527
South Dakota ‍‍‍	8	–	10	.444	32	–	24	.571
North Dakota ‍‍‍	7	–	11	.389	26	–	30	.464
North Dakota State ‍‍‍	6	–	12	.333	19	–	31	.380
Kansas City ‍‍‍	1	–	17	.056	5	–	43	.104
† – Conference champion ‡ – Tournament champion y – Invited to the NCAA tournament * Ineligible for the 2025 NCAA tournament due to transition from Division III; As of May 17, 2025; Rankings from NFCA/USA Today

The 2025 Summit League softball tournament took place from May 7–10, 2025. All six eligible teams of the league's seven (St. Thomas is ineligible) met in the modified double-elimination tournament at Jerald T. Moriarty Field on the campus of South Dakota State University in Brookings, South Dakota. Omaha successfully defended their title with their third tournament championship and earned the Summit League's automatic bid to the 2025 NCAA Division I softball tournament.

== Standings ==
Place	Seed	Team	Conference			Overall		
Place	Seed	Team	W	L	%	W	L	%
1	1	Omaha	14	4	.778	36	10	.783
2		St. Thomas	14	4	.778	33	17	.660
3	2	South Dakota State	13	5	.722	28	24	.538
4	3	South Dakota	8	10	.444	28	22	.560
5	4	North Dakota	7	11	.389	25	28	.472
6	5	North Dakota State	6	12	.333	19	30	.388
7	6	Kansas City	1	17	.056	5	42	.106

- St. Thomas is ineligible for postseason tournaments through 2026

== Format and seeding ==
All eligible teams from the regular season will be seeded one through six based on conference winning percentage during the conference's regular season. The tournament will play out as a modified double-elimination tournament, with the bottom four seeds playing each other in the single-elimination first round and the rest of the tournament as double-elimination. Due to their transition from Division III to Division I, St. Thomas is ineligible for the Summit League and NCAA tournaments until 2026.

== Schedule and results ==
Game	Time*	Matchup^{#}	Television	Attendance
First Round – Wednesday, May 7
1	1:00 PM	No. 4 North Dakota 8 vs. No. 5 North Dakota State 0 (5 inn.)	SLN	147
2	3:30 PM	No. 3 South Dakota 8 vs. No. 6 Kansas City 6	SLN	147
Quarterfinals – Thursday, May 8
3	11:00 AM	No. 1 Omaha 4 vs. No. 4 North Dakota 2	SLN	189
4	1:30 PM	No. 2 South Dakota State 6 vs. No. 3 South Dakota 5 (10 inn.)	SLN	266
5	4:00 PM	No. 4 North Dakota 5 vs. No. 3 South Dakota 6 (8 inn.)	SLN	189
Semifinals – Friday, May 9
6	1:00 PM	No. 1 Omaha 8 vs. No. 2 South Dakota State 6 (9 inn.)	MidcoSN/SLN	266
7	3:30 PM	No. 2 South Dakota State 2 vs. No. 3 South Dakota 3 (8 inn.)	MidcoSN/SLN	125
Finals – Saturday, May 10
8	1:00 PM	No. 1 Omaha 1 vs. No. 3 South Dakota 9	MidcoSN/SLN	205
9	3:30 PM	No. 1 Omaha 4 vs. No. 3 South Dakota 2	MidcoSN/SLN	210
*Game times in CDT. # - Rankings denote tournament seed. Reference:

== All-Tournament Team ==
The following players were named to the All-Tournament team:

Player	School
Katherine Johnson (MVP)	Omaha
Sydney Thomason	Omaha
Rylinn Groff	Omaha
Maggie O'Brien	Omaha
Maddia Groff	Omaha
Clara Edwards	South Dakota
Abi Brown	South Dakota
Rylie Jones	South Dakota
Madison Evans	South Dakota
Tayler Baker	South Dakota State
Mia Jarecki	South Dakota State
Brooke Dumont	South Dakota State
Camryn Lasota	North Dakota
Jackie Albrecht	North Dakota
Lauren Parker	Kansas City
Bella Dean	North Dakota State
