= UNC Greensboro Spartans wrestling =

UNCG Wrestling was an NCAA Division I wrestling program at the University of North Carolina at Greensboro (UNCG).

In 2008 UNCG wrestlers Chris Bullins and Daren Burns qualified for the US Olympic Team Trials in Greco-Roman.

On March 14, 2011 Athletic Director Kim Record announced intentions to cut the program, saying that the $308,000 to run the program can be better invested in other programs.

After the program was cut the two former coaches, Jason Loukides and Daren Burns ran Y.E.S. Wrestling; a non-profit wrestling club to provide high level wrestling instruction and competition while also promoting the importance of academic success.
