= UNC Greensboro Spartans =

Collegiate sports club in the United States

UNCG Spartans
- University: University of North Carolina at Greensboro
- Nickname: Spartans
- NCAA: Division I
- Conference: Southern Conference
- Athletic director: Brian Mackin
- Location: Greensboro, North Carolina
- Varsity teams: 17
- Basketball arena: Fleming Gymnasium; First Horizon Coliseum
- Baseball stadium: UNCG Baseball Stadium
- Soccer stadium: UNCG Soccer Stadium
- Mascot: "Spiro" the Spartan
- Fight song: Blue and Gold
- Website: uncgspartans.com
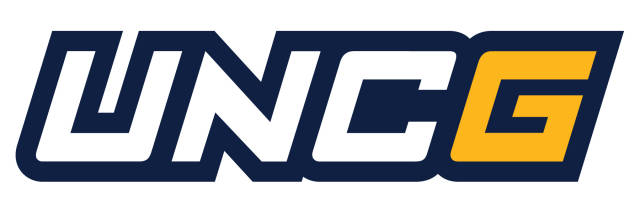

SoCon logo in UNCG colors

The UNC Greensboro (UNCG) Spartans are the athletic teams that represent the University of North Carolina at Greensboro in Greensboro, North Carolina. All 17 UNCG sports compete in the Southern Conference (SoCon).

== History ==
The intercollegiate athletics program at UNCG began in the late 1940s during the days of the Woman's College of the University of North Carolina (WCUNC), with students participating in national golf tournaments in 1948 and the school hosting the national tournaments for women's golf (1954) and tennis (1965). In 1964 males students were first admitted and the intercollegiate athletic program integrated male sports. In preparation for the incporporation of male students, the school became The University of North Carolina at Greensboro in 1963. During the 1980s, all Spartan teams competed in Division III (non-scholarship) and then Division II (scholarship) of the National Collegiate Athletic Association (NCAA), and all teams have competed in Division I since Fall 1991. UNCG is a three-time winner of the Big South's Sasser Cup.

== Teams ==
UNCG is a member of the Southern Conference (SoCon) and sponsors teams in eight men's and nine women's NCAA sanctioned sports:

Men's sports	Women's sports
Baseball	Basketball
Basketball	Cross Country
Cross Country	Golf
Golf	Soccer
Soccer	Softball
Tennis	Tennis
Track and field ^{1}	Track and field ^{1}
	Volleyball
^{1} Includes both, indoor and outdoor.

Although not considered official sports teams, UNCG has a cheerleading squad, the UNCG Cheerleading Squad and dance team, The Spartan Gs. The UNCG club football team competes in the South Atlantic Conference of the National Club Football Association. UNCG formerly sponsored a wrestling program (UNC Greensboro Spartans wrestling), which was dropped as a school sport in March 2011.

== Championships ==
=== Team national championships ===
UNC Greensboro has won five team national championships. All five were won while at the NCAA Division III level.

- Men's Soccer (5): 1982, 1983, 1985, 1986, 1987

== Achievements ==
=== Baseball ===
Brian Moehler played at UNCG from 1991-1994 and was selected in the sixth round of the 1993 Major League Baseball Amateur Draft. Moehler played 13 seasons of Major League Baseball and was inducted into the UNCG Athletic Hall of Fame in 2005.

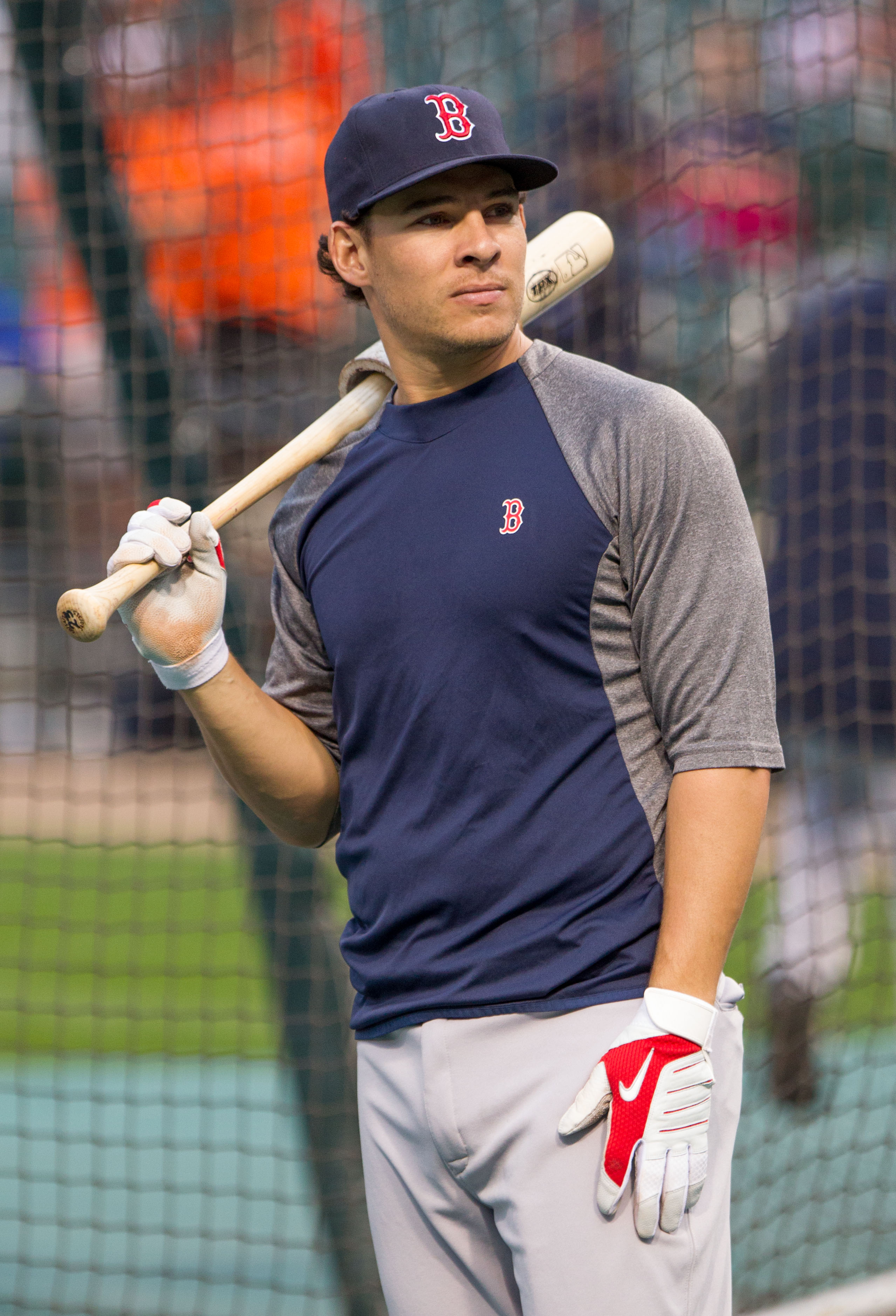
Danny Valencia

Danny Valencia played third base at UNCG and was the 2004 SoCon Freshman of the Year, and was voted second-team All-Conference.

On April 18, 2006, UNCG earned its first win over a top-ranked team in any sport during the university's Division I era. The baseball team defeated top-ranked North Carolina, 7–6, in front of a crowd of 1,835.

On February 20, 2024, UNCG beat No.1 Wake Forest, 4-3. On March 12, 2024, UNCG beat No.13 NC State, 18-3.

- 1998: SoCon Regular Season Champions.
- 2017: SoCon Tournament Champions.
- 2018: SoCon Regular Season Champions.
- 2022: SoCon Tournament Champions.
- 2024: SoCon Regular Season Champions.

=== Men's Basketball ===
On March 2, 1996 UNCG beat Liberty, 79–53, to claim the Big South Tournament Championship and advance to the NCAA Tournament for the first time in Division I. Five seniors from the team had their numbers honored. Guard Scott Hartzell finished his career as the program's all-time leading scorer with 1,539 points.

On March 4, 2001 UNCG won its first Men's Basketball SoCon Championship on David Schuck's buzzer-beating layup. UNCG had their second trip to the "Big Dance" in five years. Guard Nathan Jameson was named first-team Verizon Academic All-America.

On December 31, 2005 UNCG hosted top-ranked Duke at the Greensboro Coliseum in front of a record crowd of 21,124. The near capacity crowd was the largest to ever see a UNCG athletic event.

On November 9, 2007 UNCG had their first win against an Atlantic Coast Conference opponent when they beat Georgia Tech at Alexander Memorial Coliseum, 83-74.

On December 5, 2008 UNCG announced their home games would be played in the Greensboro Coliseum.

On November 17, 2023 UNCG beat No.14 ranked Arkansas in Bud Walton Arena, 78-72. The upset was UNCG's first win over a Top 25 team and the first Southeastern Conference (SEC) win in UNCG program history.

- 1996: NCAA Tournament Appearance.
- 2001: SoCon Tournament Champions. NCAA Tournament Appearance.
- 2002: SoCon Regular Season Champions.
- 2012: SoCon Regular Season Champions.
- 2017: SoCon Regular Season Champions.
- 2018: SoCon Regular Season Champions and SoCon Tournament Champions. NCAA Tournament Appearance.
- 2021: SoCon Regular Season Champions and SoCon Tournament Champions. NCAA Tournament Appearance.

=== Women's Basketball ===
In December 2005, UNCG's women's basketball program enjoyed two of its greatest non-conference wins since moving to the Division I level. UNCG beat West Virginia in Fleming Gym, marking UNCG's first win over a Big East School. 12 days later, UNCG beat ACC member Wake Forest on the road, marking the program's first victory over Wake Forest since 1977.

- 1998: SoCon Tournament Champions. NCAA Tournament Appearance.
- 1999: SoCon Regular Season Champions.
- 2002: SoCon Regular Season Champions. WNIT Appearance.
- 2017: WBI Appearance.
- 2024: WNIT Appearance.

=== Men's Golf ===
- 2007: Individual SoCon Champion.
- 2015: Team SoCon Champions.
- 2017: Individual SoCon Champion.
- 2018: Individual SoCon Champion and Team SoCon Champions.
- 2019: Individual SoCon Champion and Team SoCon Champions.

=== Men's Soccer ===
In December 1989 UNCG played in the NCAA Division II Men's Soccer Championship game and lost to New Hampshire College (now Southern New Hampshire University), 1-3.

On September 7, 1991 UNCG played its first game in UNCG Soccer Stadium, a $3.6 million facility. The Spartans defeated Campbell, 3–1. Four days later, the Spartans stunned No. 2 NC State, 2–1.

In 2004 UNCG was ranked No.1 for multiple weeks.

In 2008 UNCG went into the SoCon Tournament as the #7 seed and was the lowest seed to win the SoCon Soccer Tournament Championship. During their unbelievable run, the Spartans knocked off Duke in the first round of the NCAA tournament, Loyola (MD) in overtime in the second round, and was the first team to make it to the Sweet 16 of the NCAA Tournament with a losing record.

On November 20, 2022 UNCG hosted Ohio State in the second round of the NCAA Tournament and won in penalty kicks, 6-5. On November 27, 2022 UNCG played No.5 Stanford in the third round of the NCAA Tournament and won in penalty kicks, 3-1. On December 3, 2022 UNCG hosted No.13 Indiana in the Elite 8 and lost 0-2. After the season, UNCG Midfielder and 2022 SoCon Player of the Year J.C. Ngando was picked fifth overall in the 2023 MLS SuperDraft and signed with the Vancouver Whitecaps FC.

- 1997: SoCon Regular Season Champions.
- 1998: SoCon Regular Season Champions and SoCon Tournament Champions.
- 2004: SoCon Regular Season Champions. Sweet 16 Appearance.
- 2005: SoCon Regular Season Champions and SoCon Tournament Champions. Sweet 16 Appearance.
- 2006: SoCon Regular Season Champions and SoCon Tournament Champions. Sweet 16 Appearance.
- 2008: SoCon Tournament Champions. Sweet 16 Appearance.
- 2010: SoCon Regular Season Champions and SoCon Tournament Champions.
- 2011: SoCon Regular Season Champions.
- 2019: SoCon Regular Season Champions.
- 2020-2021: SoCon Tournament Champions.
- 2021: SoCon Regular Season Champions.
- 2022: SoCon Regular Season Champions and SoCon Tournament Champions. Elite 8 Appearance.

=== Women's Soccer ===
- 1997: SoCon Regular Season Champions and SoCon Tournament Champions.
- 1998: SoCon Regular Season Champions and SoCon Tournament Champions.
- 2000: SoCon Tournament Champions.
- 2001: SoCon Regular Season Champions and SoCon Tournament Champions.
- 2004: SoCon Regular Season Champions.
- 2006: SoCon Regular Season Champions and SoCon Tournament Champions.
- 2007: SoCon Regular Season Champions and SoCon Tournament Runner up.
- 2008: SoCon Regular Season Champions and SoCon Tournament Runner up.
- 2017: SoCon Tournament Champions.
- 2018: SoCon Tournament Champions.

=== Softball ===
- 2017: SoCon Regular Season Champions.
- 2018: SoCon Regular Season Champions and SoCon Tournament Champions.
- 2019: SoCon Regular Season Champions.
- 2021: SoCon Regular Season Champions and SoCon Tournament Champions.
- 2022: SoCon Regular Season Champions.
- 2023: SoCon Regular Season Champions and SoCon Tournament Champions.
- 2026: SoCon Regular Season Champions and SoCon Tournament Champions.

=== Volleyball ===
- 2021: SoCon Regular Season Champions.

== Hall of Fame ==
The university established the UNCG Athletics Hall of Fame in 2000. The Hall of Fame honors those athletes, coaches, and people whose outstanding contributions have enriched the athletic programs of the University of North Carolina at Greensboro.

== Athletic Director ==
- Nelson E. Bobb (1983–2009)
- Kim Record (2009–2021)
- Brian Mackin (2022–present)
