= East Tennessee State Buccaneers =

Sports teams of a university

- University: East Tennessee State University
- Nickname: Buccaneers
- NCAA: Division I (FCS)
- Conference: Southern Conference
- Athletic director: Dr. Richard Sander
- Location: Johnson City, Tennessee
- Varsity teams: 17
- Football stadium: William Greene Stadium
- Basketball arena: Freedom Hall Civic Center
- Baseball stadium: Thomas Stadium
- Softball stadium: Betty Basler Field
- Soccer stadium: Summers-Taylor Stadium
- Golf course: Warren-Greene Golf Center
- Tennis venue: Dave Mullins Tennis Complex
- Other venues: J. Madison Brooks Gymnasium; ETSU Athletic Center
- Colors: Navy blue and gold
- Mascot: Bucky
- Website: etsubucs.com
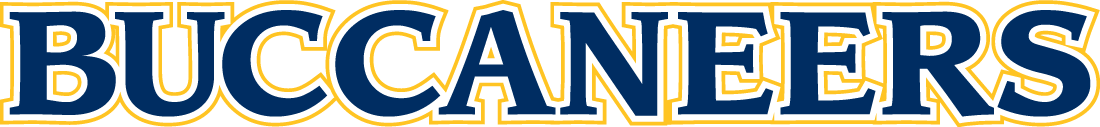

The East Tennessee State Buccaneers are the 17 intercollegiate athletics teams that represent East Tennessee State University (ETSU), located in Johnson City, Tennessee. ETSU's teams include men and women's basketball, cross country, golf, soccer, tennis, and track and field; women's-only softball and volleyball; and men's-only baseball and football. The Buccaneers compete at the National Collegiate Athletic Association (NCAA) Division I level as a member of the Southern Conference (SoCon).

== Teams ==
A member of the Southern Conference, ETSU sponsors teams in eight men's and nine women's NCAA-sanctioned sports: The most recent change to ETSU's sports sponsorship was the dropping of men's indoor track & field after the 2022–23 season.

Men's sports	Women's sports
Baseball	Basketball
Basketball	Cross Country
Cross Country	Golf
Golf	Soccer
Football	Softball
Soccer	Tennis
Tennis	Track and field ^{1}
Track and field ^{2}	Triathlon
	Volleyball
^{1} (indoor & outdoor) – ^{2} (outdoor)

=== Baseball ===
SoCon's logo in East Tennessee State's colors

Casey Mae Riley serves as the Director of Player Operations. ETSU's baseball team won the 2013 Atlantic Sun Tournament with a 7–2 win over Kennesaw State May 26, 2013. The first-ever A-Sun championship for ETSU win earned the Bucs their first NCAA tournament appearance in 32 years.

=== Basketball ===
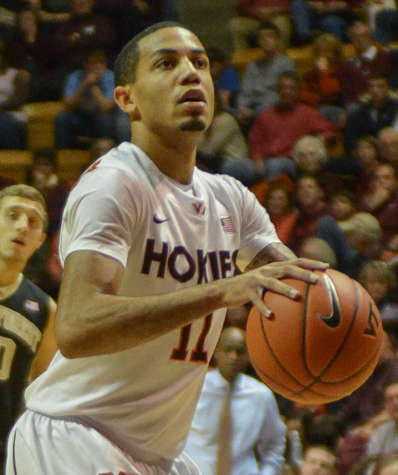
Erick Green

ETSU has a long history in men's basketball with an all-time record of 1,252–1,005 and 10 overall appearances in the NCAA Men's Division I Basketball Championship, with their last appearance occurring in 2017. They appeared in the Sweet Sixteen in the 1968 NCAA Men's Division I Basketball Tournament, and have an overall tournament record of 2–10.

The men's head coach is currently Desmond Oliver. He became the 18th head coach in ETSU's 100+ year history. After Steve Forbes left to become head coach of Wake Forest in 2020, assistant Jason Shay became the men's head basketball coach for one season.

ETSU has also had success with their women's basketball program going to the NCAA Women's Division I Basketball Championships in 2008, 2009, and 2010. Besides appearing in the NCAA Women's Division I Basketball Championship three times, they have also appeared Women's National Invitation Tournament three times with their most recent appearance coming in 2015. Overall the women's program has 543–597 record.

The women's head coach is currently Brittney Ezell. She became the eighth head coach in the 46-year history of East Tennessee State University women's basketball on May 8, 2013. The 2013–14 campaign—in which the team went 9–21 overall—was Ezell's first leading the Bucs after spending three seasons as the head coach at Belmont University in Nashville. In 2014–15, ETSU experienced an unbelievable turnaround under Ezell with a 16-game win progression from 2013 to 2014 where the Bucs went 9–21. The total win improvement was the second best in the country. The 2014–15 win total of 21 marked the first time since the 2009–10 season that ETSU reached 20 wins. Led by Ezell, the Bucs made it to the Southern Conference Tournament Championship game falling to No.1 seed Chattanooga in overtime, 61–56. ETSU appeared in the Women's National Invitational Tournament (WNIT) for the third time in school history falling short to NC State, 73–59.

=== Football ===
East Tennessee State established its first football team in 1920 when the university was still called East Tennessee State Normal School. ETSU fielded a team every year until the 2004 season when the decision was made to disband the program based on the recommendations of a 1999 Athletic Task Force and then university president Paul Stanton. In January 2013, the Student Government Association approved a student fee increase that would help fund and resurrect the program. Former University of Tennessee head coach Phillip Fulmer was given the task of helping guide the direction of the new program. On the recommendation of Coach Fulmer, ETSU hired former University of North Carolina head coach Carl Torbush as the team's new head coach. In the Fall of 2017, the Buccaneers will begin playing on their newly erected football stadium.

Notable football alumni include Donnie Abraham, Earl Ferrell, Thane Gash, Gerald Sensabaugh and Mike Smith. A couple of the more memorable highlights of ETSU football history include the 1969 team that went undefeated and beat Louisiana Tech, led by Terry Bradshaw, in the Grantland Rice Bowl in Baton Rouge, LA and the 1996 team that went 10-3 and advanced to the Division I-AA quarterfinals after defeating Villanova, 35–29, in a first-round playoff game in Memorial Center.

=== Men's golf ===
The men's golf team has won 29 conference championships.

- Ohio Valley Conference (3): 1970, 1972, 1976
- Southern Conference (24): 1979–1983, 1989–1992, 1994–1996, 1998–2001, 2005, 2015–2017, 2021–2025
- Atlantic Sun Conference (2): 2007, 2010

Their best finish in the NCAA Division I Championship was 3rd place in 1996.

Notable ETSU golfers include Eric Axley, Rhys Davies, David Eger, Larry Hinson, Mike Hulbert, Keith Nolan, J. C. Snead, Bobby Wadkins, Garrett Willis and Adrian Meronk.

== Southern Conference ==
On May 30, 2013, the Southern Conference announced that it was extending an invitation for membership to the Buccaneers, effective July 1, 2014. ETSU accepted the invitation and joined Mercer and VMI in the conference, replacing Appalachian State, Davidson, Elon and Georgia Southern beginning in the league's 2014 season. The Buccaneers rejoined the league after a nine-year absence.

== Bucky ==
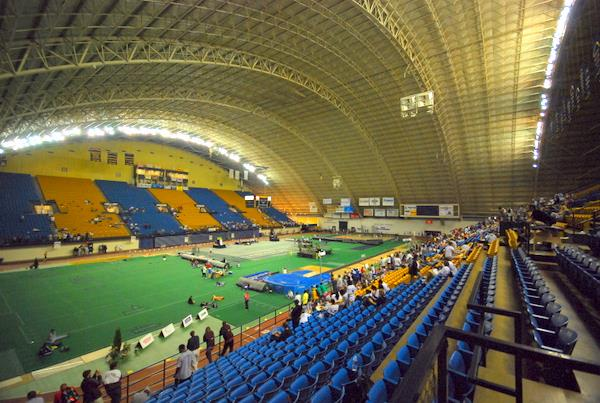
ETSU-Mountain States Health Alliance Athletic Center

Bucky's background begins with the story of the East Tennessee State University nickname—the Buccaneers. A brief history begins with a Buccaneer, who once roamed a vast area which stretched from the Florida Keys northward. Johnson City, home of ETSU, is located among the mountains of Eastern Tennessee and is a great distance from the ocean, but geologists and archaeologists teamed up and discovered an underground river near the university. Named Pirate Creek, it evidently winds its way through many tunnels.

It is thought that these caverns at one time channeled all the way to the Atlantic Ocean. Soon after this discovery, the legend of buccaneer, Jean Paul LeBucque was found in history books. The legend describes how LeBucque was a nuisance and terror. Evidently, he was looking for a place to hide his great store of gold and treasure, and find safety for himself. He sailed north in search of a new home and began to look inland. Legend states that he discovered the underground river near Johnson City and called Pirate Creek his home. Geologists feel that the upheaval of the Earth's crust, which now blocks the channel, possibly killed LeBucque. This legend is widely accepted and is one way to explain why an inland school would choose a pirate nickname.
