= Maya Brady =

American softball player (born 2001)

Oklahoma City Spark
- Utility
- Born: June 1, 2001 (age 25); San Mateo, California, U.S.
- Bats: Left Throws: Right

Teams
- UCLA (2020–2024); Utah Talons (2025); Oklahoma City Spark (2026–present)

Career highlights and awards
- AUSL champion (2025); 2× Pac-12 Player of the Year (2023, 2024); WCWS All-Tournament Team (2022); Softball America Freshman of the Year (2020); 3× First team All-American (2021, 2023, 2024); 3× First team All-Pac 12 (2021, 2023, 2024); Pac-12 All-Freshman team (2021)
Medals
Women's softball
Representing the United States
World Cup
Silver medal – second place	2024 Castions di Strada	Team
World Games
Gold medal – first place	2025 Chengdu	Team

Maya Ann Brady-Timmons (born June 1, 2001) is an American professional softball player for the Oklahoma City Spark of the Athletes Unlimited Softball League (AUSL). She played college softball for the UCLA Bruins. As a freshman in 2020, she was named Softball America Freshman of the Year.

== High school career ==
Brady attended Oaks Christian School in Westlake Village, California where she was a middle infielder and led the team to three Marmonte League titles and was a two-time league MVP. During her senior year, she had a .558 batting average with 12 home runs and 32 runs batted in (RBI). Following an outstanding season, she was named Marmonte League Most Valuable Player and All-CIF Southern section, as well as the Ventura County Star 2019 All-County Softball Player of the Year and Los Angeles Daily News Player of the Year. She was ranked the No. 2 recruit in the nation by FloSoftball and Softball America.

== College career ==
Brady made her collegiate debut for UCLA Bruins in 2020. During the opening week of the season at the Stacy Winsberg Memorial Tournament, Brady was 9-for-18, with four home runs, nine RBI, and nine runs scored. She was subsequently named Pac-12 Freshman and Player of the Week for the week ending February 11, 2020. During her Freshman year she finished with a .356 batting average, .699 slugging percentage and led the team with seven home runs and tying for first with 28 RBI, tied for second with seven multiple-RBI games and tied for third with seven multi-hit games, and ranked third with 22 runs scored and 11 walks. Following the season that was cancelled due to the COVID-19 pandemic, she was named Softball America Freshman of the Year.

During her redshirt freshman year in 2021, she had a .333 batting average, six stolen bases, and nine multiple-RBI games. She tied for second with 13 home runs, third with 36 runs batted in, 31 runs scored and 19 walks. Following an outstanding season, she was named to the first team All-Pac-12, Pac-12 All-Freshman team and NFCA first team All-American.

To begin the 2023 season, Brady recorded 11 consecutive hits, setting a new UCLA program record, surpassing the previous record of 10 held by Stacey Nuveman (1999) and Lisa Fernandez (1993). She was subsequently named the NFCA National Player of the Week for the week ending February 14, 2023, after she went 13-for-16 with 14 RBI and four home runs in UCLA's season-opening Stacy Winsberg Memorial Tournament. She finished the 2023 regular season with a .456 batting average, 16 home runs and 56 RBIs. She led the conference in batting average, hits (72), total bases (138), extra-base hits (31), on base percentage (.519) and slugging percentage (.873). Following the season she was named first-team all-Pac-12, Pac-12 Conference Softball Player of the Year and the Pac-12 batting champion.

During her senior year in 2024, she led UCLA with 71 hits, 68 RBI, 59 runs scored, 31 extra-base hits, 137 total bases, a .418 batting average and .500 on-base percentage, and ranked second on the team with 17 home runs and an .806 slugging percentage. She led the Pac-12 Conference for a second straight season in extra-base hits (31), RBI (68) and total bases (137). Following the season she was named the Pac-12 Player of the Year, a USA Softball Collegiate Player of the Year top-ten finalist and an NFCA First Team All-American for the second consecutive season. She finished her collegiate career ranked second in UCLA program history in home runs (71), RBI (246), total bases (550) and slugging percentage (.757), fourth in runs scored (229), and sixth in career games played (249).

== Professional career ==
On January 29, 2025, Brady was drafted in the fifth round, 19th overall, by the Talons in the inaugural Athletes Unlimited Softball League draft. During the 2025 AUSL season, she appeared in six games and hit .647 with one double, one home run and five RBI, and helped the Talons win the inaugural AUSL championship.

Brady also plays for the Toyota Red Terriers of the Japan Diamond Softball League. As a rookie in 2025, she helped the Red Terriers win their third consecutive league championship (Diamond Series).

During the 2025 AUSL season, Brady missed the first month of action due to a hamstring injury. She reached base in her first 10 plate appearances, going 7-for-7 with three walks. She finished the season with a .500 batting average in 22 at-bats. On December 1, 2025, she was drafted first overall by the Oklahoma City Spark in the AUSL expansion draft.

== International career ==
Brady represented the United States at the 2024 Women's Softball World Cup and won a silver medal. She represented the United States at the 2025 World Games and won a gold medal. At the 2026 USA Softball International Cup, Brady was named Most Valuable Player of the tournament as the United States won gold.

== Personal life ==
Brady's parents are Maureen Brady and Brian Timmons. Her mother was an All-American pitcher at Fresno State. She is the niece of former American football player Tom Brady and former Major League Baseball player Kevin Youkilis. Her younger sister Hannah plays college volleyball at Michigan.
