= Pac-12 Conference Softball Player of the Year =

Pac-12 Conference Player of the Year
- Awarded for: the most outstanding college softball player in the Pac-12 Conference
- Country: United States

History
- First award: 1987
- Most recent: Maya Brady, UCLA

The Pac-12 Conference Softball Player of the Year is a college softball award given to the Pac-12 Conference's most outstanding player. The award was first given following the 1987 season, with both pitchers and position players eligible. After the 1999 season, the Pac-12 Conference Softball Pitcher of the Year award was created to honor the most outstanding pitcher. Both awards continued to be presented until the conference's 2024 collapse that left it with only two full members, with Oregon State the only one that sponsored softball. Pac-12 softball will resume play in the 2027 season, with Oregon State joined by six new softball-sponsoring full members. (Note: The other legacy member, Washington State, and 2026 arrival Gonzaga do not sponsor softball.)

The conference was known as the Pacific-10 before becoming the Pac-12 in 2011.

== Key ==
*	Awarded one of the following College National Player of the Year awards: USA Softball Collegiate Player of the Year; NFCA National Player of the Year

== Winners ==
Season	Player	School	Reference
1987	Lisa Longaker; Jodi Rathbun	UCLA; Arizona State	
1988	Lisa Longaker (2)	UCLA	
1989	Katie Wiese	Oregon	
1990	Lisa Longaker (3)	UCLA	
1991	Lisa Fernandez	UCLA	
1992	Lisa Fernandez (2)	UCLA	
1993	Lisa Fernandez (3)	UCLA	
1994	Susie Parra	Arizona	
1995	Laura Espinoza	Arizona	
1996	Jenny Dalton	Arizona	
1997	Alison McCutcheon	Arizona	
1998	Alison McCutcheon (2)	Arizona	
1999	Stacey Nuveman	UCLA	
2000	Jessica Mendoza	Stanford	
2001	Stacey Nuveman (2)	UCLA	
2002	Stacey Nuveman (3)	UCLA	
2003	Natasha Watley	UCLA	
2004	Kristen Rivera	Washington	
2005	Kristen Rivera (2); Caitlin Lowe	Washington; Arizona	
2006	Andrea Duran	UCLA	
2007	Kaitlin Cochran	Arizona State	
2008	Kaitlin Cochran (2)	Arizona State	
2009	Kaitlin Cochran (3)	Arizona State	
2010	Megan Langenfeld	UCLA	
2011	Ashley Hansen	Stanford	
2012	Valerie Arioto	California	
2013	Amber Freeman	Arizona State	
2014	Ally Carda	UCLA	
2015	Ally Carda (2)	UCLA	
2016	Hannah Flippen	Utah	
2017	Hannah Flippen (2); Kaityana Mauga	Utah; Arizona	
2018	Rachel Garcia	UCLA	
2019	Rachel Garcia (2)	UCLA	
2021	Rachel Garcia (3)	UCLA	
2022	Baylee Klingler	Washington	
2023	Maya Brady	UCLA	
2024	Maya Brady (2)	UCLA	
2025	Award not presented during Pac-12 hiatus		
2026	Award not presented during Pac-12 hiatus		
2027	Award resumes in 2027		

== Winners by school ==
Notes on membership dates:

- Years listed reflect softball seasons, which take place in the calendar year after a school officially joins.
- For legacy Pac-12 members — those that were members before the conference's collapse — the first year reflects the later of (1) the first softball season after joining, or (2) the 1987 season when the award was first presented.

School (dates)	Winners	Years
UCLA (1987–2024)	19	1987, 1988, 1990, 1991, 1992, 1993, 1999, 2001, 2002, 2003, 2006, 2010, 2014, 2015, 2018, 2019, 2021, 2023, 2024
Arizona (1987–2024)	7	1994, 1995, 1996, 1997, 1998, 2005, 2017
Arizona State (1987–2024)	5	1987, 2007, 2008, 2009, 2013
Washington (1987–2024)	3	2004, 2005, 2022
Stanford (1987–2024)	2	2000, 2011
Utah (2012–2024)	2	2016, 2017
California (1987–2024)	1	2012
Oregon (1987–2024)	1	1989
Boise State (2027–present)	0	—
Colorado State (2027–present)	0	—
Fresno State (2027–present)	0	—
Oregon State (1987–present)	0	—
San Diego State (2027–present)	0	—
Texas State (2027–present)	0	—
Utah State (2027–present)	0	—
