= Pac-12 Conference Softball Pitcher of the Year =

Pac-12 Conference Pitcher of the Year
- Awarded for: the most outstanding college softball pitcher in the Pac-12 Conference
- Country: United States

History
- First award: 1999
- Most recent: NiJaree Canady, Stanford

The Pac-12 Conference Softball Pitcher of the Year is a college softball award given to the Pac-12 Conference's most outstanding pitcher. The award was given annually from 1999 until the conference's 2024 collapse that left it with only two full members, with Oregon State the only one that sponsored softball. Pac-12 softball will resume play in the 2027 season, with Oregon State joined by six new softball-sponsoring full members. (Note: The other legacy member, Washington State, and 2026 arrival Gonzaga do not sponsor softball.) The conference was known as the Pacific-10 before becoming the Pac-12 in 2011.

== Key ==
*	Awarded one of the following College National Player of the Year awards: USA Softball Collegiate Player of the Year; NFCA National Player of the Year

== Winners ==
Season	Player	School	Reference
1999	Courtney Dale	UCLA	
2000	Jennifer Spediacci	Washington	
2001	Jennie Finch	Arizona	
2002	Jennie Finch (2)	Arizona	
2003	Keira Goerl	UCLA	
2004	Alicia Hollowell	Arizona	
2005	Brianne McGowan	Oregon State	
2006	Kristina Thorson	California	
2007	Katie Burkhart	Arizona State	
2008	Katie Burkhart (2)	Arizona State	
2009	Danielle Lawrie	Washington	
2010	Danielle Lawrie (2)	Washington	
2011	Jolene Henderson	California	
2012	Jolene Henderson (2)	California	
2013	Jessica Moore	Oregon	
2014	Cheridan Hawkins	Oregon	
2015	Cheridan Hawkins (2)	Oregon	
2016	Cheridan Hawkins (3)	Oregon	
2017	Danielle O'Toole	Arizona	
2018	Megan Kleist	Oregon	
2019	Rachel Garcia	UCLA	
2021	Gabbie Plain	Washington	
2022	Megan Faraimo	UCLA	
2023	Megan Faraimo (2)	UCLA	
2024	NiJaree Canady	Stanford	
2024	NiJaree Canady	Stanford	
2025	Award not presented during Pac-12 hiatus		
2026	Award not presented during Pac-12 hiatus		
2027	Award resumes in 2027		

== Winners by school ==
Notes on membership dates:

- Years listed reflect softball seasons, which take place in the calendar year after a school officially joins.
- For legacy Pac-12 members — those that were members before the conference's collapse — the first year reflects the later of (1) the first softball season after joining, or (2) the 1999 season when the award was first presented.

School (dates)	Winners	Years
Oregon (1999–2024)	5	2013, 2014, 2015, 2016, 2018
UCLA (1999–2024)	5	1999, 2003, 2019, 2022, 2023
Arizona (1999–2024)	4	2001, 2002, 2004, 2017
Washington (1999–2024)	4	2000, 2009, 2010, 2021
California (1999–2024)	3	2006, 2011, 2012
Arizona State (1999–2024)	2	2007, 2008
Oregon State (1999–present)	1	2005
Stanford (1999–2024)	1	2024
Boise State (2027–present)	0	—
Colorado State (2027–present)	0	—
Fresno State (2027–present)	0	—
San Diego State (2027–present)	0	—
Texas State (2027–present)	0	—
Utah (2012–2024)	0	—
Utah State (2027–present)	0	—
