= List of Arizona Wildcats head softball coaches =

The Arizona Wildcats softball program is a college softball team that represents the University of Arizona in the Big 12 Conference in the National Collegiate Athletic Association. The team has had seven head coaches since it started playing organized softball in the 1974 season. Mike Candrea holds nearly all coaching records, having taken over the head coaching position in 1986, but has stepped aside to coach the US National Team at the Olympics in 2004 and 2008 before returning, and retired in 2021. Caitlin Lowe is the current head coach, who led her first season in 2022.

== Key ==
General
#	Number of coaches (Note: A running total of the number of head coaches.)
GC	Games coached

Overall
OW	Wins
OL	Losses
OT	Ties
O%	Winning percentage

Conference (Note: Arizona was a member of the Intermountain Conference from 1974 through 1979. They then were members of the Western Collegiate Athletic Association from 1980 through 1985. They moved to the Pacific-West Conference in 1986. The Pac-12 Conference, then known as the Pac-10, began sponsoring women's sports in 1987.)
CW	Wins
CL	Losses
CT	Ties
C%	Winning percentage

Postseason (Note: Postseason play involving the NCAA Division I Softball Championship or AIAW Women's College World Series.)
PA	Total Appearances (Note: Postseason appearances include seasons with NCAA Division I Softball Championship bids since the tournament began in 1982.)
PW	Total Wins
PL	Total Losses
WA	Women's College World Series appearances (Note: Women's College World Series appearances include seasons with WCWS bids since the tournament began in 1969.)
WW	Women's College World Series Wins
WL	Women's College World Series Losses

Championships
CC	Conference regular season
NC	National championships (Note: Women's College World Series sponsored by either the AIAW or NCAA.)

== Coaches ==
List of head softball coaches showing season(s) coached, overall records, conference records, postseason records, championships and selected awards (Note: Statistics correct as of the end of the 2026 NCAA Division I softball season.)
#	Name	Term	GC	OW	OL	OT	O%	CW	CL	CT	C%	PA	WA	CCs	NCs
1	Judy Spray	1974–1976	63	45	18	0	.714	—	—	—	—	2	2	0	0
2	Ginny Parrish	1977–1979	122	82	40	0	.672	24	11	0	.686	1	1	1	0
3	Rocky LaRose	1980	46	23	23	0	.500	2	14	0	.125	0	0	0	0
4	Paula Noel	1981–1985	196	103	93	0	.656	28	63	0	.308	0	0	0	0
5	Mike Candrea	1986–2003, 2005–2007, 2009–2021	2,109	1,674	433	2	.794	485	212	2	.695	34	24	10	8
6	Larry Ray (Interim)	2004, 2008	116	91	25	0	.784	30	11	0	.732	2	1	1	0
7	Caitlin Lowe	2022–present	286	190	96	1	.664	87	105	0	.453	4	1	0	0
