= Washington Huskies softball =

Washington softball team

- 2026 Washington Huskies softball team
- Founded: 1993
- University: University of Washington
- Athletic director: Patrick Chun
- Head coach: Heather Tarr (21st season)
- Conference: Big Ten
- Location: Seattle, Washington
- Home stadium: Husky Softball Stadium (capacity: 1,500)
- Nickname: Huskies
- Colors: Purple and gold

NCAA Tournament champions
- 2009

NCAA WCWS runner-up
- 1996, 1999, 2018

NCAA WCWS appearances
- 1996, 1997, 1998, 1999, 2000, 2003, 2004, 2007, 2009, 2010, 2013, 2017, 2018, 2019, 2023

NCAA super regional appearances
- 2005, 2006, 2007, 2009, 2010, 2011, 2012, 2013, 2014, 2016, 2017, 2018, 2019, 2021, 2023

NCAA Tournament appearances
- 1994, 1995, 1996, 1997, 1998, 1999, 2000, 2001, 2002, 2003, 2004, 2005, 2006, 2007, 2008, 2009, 2010, 2011, 2012, 2013, 2014, 2015, 2016, 2017, 2018, 2019, 2021, 2022, 2023, 2024, 2025, 2026

Regular-season conference championships
- 1996, 2000, 2010, 2019

The Washington Huskies softball team represents the University of Washington in NCAA Division I college softball competition. A member of the Big Ten Conference, they play their home games on-campus at Husky Softball Stadium in Seattle, Washington. Through 2026, the Huskies have made 15 appearances at the Women's College World Series and won the national title in 2009.

== History ==
=== Beginnings ===
The program's first season was in 1993, and head coach Teresa Wilson quickly built the team into a national powerhouse, qualifying for the NCAA tournament in their second season, and guiding it to the Women's College World Series six times, including the title games in 1996 and 1999. The team finished no worse than fifth in the nation from 1996 to 2000 and Wilson compiled a record of 532–198–1 (.728). However, Wilson's tenure was cut short in late 2003, when the coach was implicated in a scandal involving dispensing drugs among her players. She became the second high-profile coach Washington fired that year following Huskies football coach Rick Neuheisel's dismissal in an NCAA wagering scandal.

After Wilson's dismissal, Scott Centala and Steve Dailey split the head coaching role for one season in 2004.

=== The Heather Tarr Era begins (2005-present) ===
After the 2004 season ended, interim Athletic Director Dick Thompson named UW alum Heather Tarr as Washington's new head coach. Tarr led the Huskies to back-to-back super regionals in her first two seasons, before making her first Women's College World Series as a coach in 2007, led by sophomore sensation Danielle Lawrie in the pitcher's circle.

The Huskies would get multiple doses of bad luck immediately after, though. Lawrie was named to Canadian National team for the 2008 Summer Olympics in Beijing, meaning she'd have to miss the 2008 season to prepare. Right before the season started, Ashley Charters and Lauren Greer, two of UW's seniors, suffered season-ending injuries. Without three of their best players, the Huskies went 30-25-1 and made the NCAA Tournament, but failed to make it past their regional for the first time since 2002.

=== The 2009 Championship run ===
In 2009, though, Lawrie, Charters, and Greer were all back, and Washington opened the year 18–0. The Huskies end the regular season ranked No. 3 in the country, a finish that normally would guarantee them home field advantage through the WCWS. But since Husky Softball Stadium did not have permanent lights, it was ineligible to host NCAA postseason games, and the Huskies were sent to Amherst, Massachusetts for the regional.

The Huskies breezed through their first game and ground out a win in their first matchup against UMass, but a loss to the Minutewomen on Sunday set up a decisive final game. Lawrie faced off against UMass ace Brandice Balschmiter. The two dueled for 15 innings, before the Huskies finally broke through with five runs in the top of the 15th to win 6-1 and send them to the super regionals, where they'd face Georgia Tech in Atlanta.

Washington made quick work of the Yellow Jackets, beating them 7–1 in the first game and 7–0 in the second to punch their ticket to Oklahoma City.

At the WCWS, UW advanced to the semifinals through the winners bracket with wins over Georgia and Arizona State. After losing their first semifinal game to the Bulldogs, the Huskies won the decisive second game to move on to their first championship series since 1999.

Washington blew Florida out in Game 1 of the series, 8–0, before grinding out a 3–2 win the next night to give the Huskies their first National Title. This marked the 22nd time in 28 seasons of World Series play in which the Pac-12 had won.

=== After the Championship ===
Led by Lawrie in her final season, UW spent the entirety of the 2010 season ranked No. 1, finishing the regular season with a record of 45–6, but lost its first two games to be the first team knocked out of the WCWS.

Washington didn't return to OKC until 2013, when the Huskies made the semifinals.

UW missed the WCWS for three straight seasons for the first time in program history from 2014 to 2016, though the Huskies did make the Super Regionals twice in that span.

Led by sophomore ace Taran Alvelo, the Huskies began their rise back to the highest levels of national prominence in 2017. After beating both No. 2 Auburn and No. 1 Oklahoma in their opening weekend, the Huskies spent much of the season in the top-10, with hopes of securing a top-eight seed, which would guarantee them home-field advantage throughout the tournament, and went into its final regular season series against Utah squarely at No. 8. After taking the first two games of the series, Washington fell behind 12–1, but then scored four runs in the top of the fifth to avoid the mercy rule before tying the game at 12–12 in the top of the seventh to force extra innings and completing the 12-run comeback with a run in the top of the eighth to win. Washington earned the No. 7 seed in the tournament, breezed through its Regional, and won its Super Regional (a rematch against Utah) at home to punch its ticket to the WCWS. There, Alvelo led the way to low-scoring triumphs of No. 3 Oregon and No. 9 UCLA, but a pair of losses to No. 1 Oklahoma ended the Huskies' season in the semifinals.

In 2018, Washington opened up the season with a perfect 28-0 nonconference record, led by the pitching combination of Alvelo and freshman Gabbie Plain. The Huskies spent much of the season ranked No. 1 in the country, but back-to-back series sweeps at the hands of No. 3 UCLA and No. 2 Oregon disrupted their momentum with one weekend left in the regular season. UW bounced back with a sweep of Oregon State and earned the No. 5 seed in the tournament, where it swept through its regular and super regional. Plain started the Huskies' first game in OKC, with Alvelo coming in for the save in a 2–0 win over No. 4 Oklahoma. Tarr repeated the strategy in Washington's next game against Oregon, with Plain going the first six innings and Alvelo slamming the door in the seventh in a 6–2 win over No. 1 Oregon. Come the semifinal, though, Tarr gave the ball to Alvelo to start, and the junior struck out six in a complete-game shutout to send UW to the championship series with a 3–0 win. There, Washington was set up to face No. 6 Florida State. In Game 1 of the series, Plain and FSU's Meghan King traded shutout innings before the Seminoles finally got on the board with a solo home run in the sixth inning to win 1–0. In Game 2, UW jumped out early 3–0, but Florida State came back with eight unanswered runs to win the game and clinch the championship.

UW notched its third straight 50-win season in 2019, bouncing back from a sweep at the hands of No. 1 UCLA and National Player of the Year Rachel Garcia by winning 23 of its final 24 games to earn the No. 3 seed in the tournament, where it won five straight games to advance to the WCWS. The Huskies lost their opening matchup to Arizona in extra innings, before winning a pair of loser-out games against Minnesota and Oklahoma State to advance to the semifinals, where they would have to beat UCLA twice. Plain and Alvelo both dueled with Garcia for nine shutout innings, with Plain throwing six shutout innings before giving the ball to Alvelo for the next three. Plain reentered the game in the bottom of the 10th inning and allowed a walk-off, three-run home run to Garcia to end the Huskies' season with a 3–0 loss.

Washington opened up the 2020 season with a 23-2 nonconference record, but the remainder of its season was canceled the week that Pac-12 play was supposed to begin due to the COVID-19 pandemic.

=== Returning from COVID-19 ===
When college softball returned in 2021, Washington brought back a roster led by graduate students Sis Bates and Morganne Flores, who led the Huskies to a 41-11 record in the regular season. Despite finishing at No. 5 in the final poll of the season, the NCAA selection committee dropped UW to No. 16, prompting the Huskies to walk out of their watch party when they were announced. For the first time since 2016, Washington wouldn't host a super regional, and would have to travel to play No. 1 Oklahoma if it made it through its regional.

That proved to be no simple matter, as the Huskies ground out a 3-0 win over Portland State to open the regional at Husky Softball Stadium, before losing 2-1 to Michigan. After bouncing back with a run-rule win over Seattle U, the Huskies went into Regional Sunday needing to beat Michigan twice. Flores gave the Huskies an early lead in the first inning of the morning game with a solo home run, which proved to be enough for Plain, who struck out eight in a two-hit shutout to set up a winner-take-all night game. Michigan got to Plain early in the decisive nightcap, building up a 5-1 lead after just two innings. After Kelley Lynch drove in two runs in the bottom of the third, the Huskies rallied for seven runs in the fourth, turning things around to win 10-5 and make it to their fifth straight super regional. Then Huskies ended up being swept by Oklahoma (the eventual national champions) to end their season.

The 2022 season continued the downward trend for the Huskies, who went 38-17 and failed to make it past regionals, losing twice at home to Texas. The season ended a storied career for Plain, who finished second in program history to Lawrie in wins (108) and strikeouts (1,068).

Plain's departure began a new chapter for Washington, which no longer had an ace in the circle. Despite that, the Huskies had a bounce-back year, led on offense by fifth-year seniors Baylee Klingler and Sami Reynolds, finishing the regular season with a 37-11 record after taking two of three from No. 6 Stanford in their final series. After going 1-1 in the inaugural Pac-12 Softball Tournament, Washington earned the No. 7 seed in the NCAA Softball Tournament, but for the third straight year ran into trouble in the regional round at home. After winning its first two games by a combined score of 13-3, UW lost 1-0 to McNeese on Sunday morning to set up a winner-take-all nightcap - Washington's third in three seasons. The Huskies, designated as the visiting team, trailed 6-0 after six innings. Down to their final three outs, the Huskies rallied for seven runs, tying the game on a bases-clearing, 3-RBI double by Reynolds with two outs and taking the lead a batter later on a Madison Huskey double.

After shutting out Louisiana Lafayette 8-0 and 2-0 in the super regional, Washington returned to the Women's College World Series, where it opened with a 4-1 win over Utah but lost 3-1 to Florida State and 1-0 to Stanford to end the season.

The momentum from a return to Oklahoma City proved to be short-lived. In 2023, the Huskies went 31-12 in the regular season and were run-ruled in their Pac-12 Tournament opener by Arizona. For the first time since 2015, Washington did not host a regional, instead traveling to the Columbia (Mo.) regional where it lost to host Missouri to end its season.

=== Move to the Big Ten ===
Washington moved from the Pac-12 to the Big Ten in the 2024-25 school year. In the offseason, UW's roster underwent substantial turnover, with four seniors from the 2024 team graduation and eight more players entering the transfer portal. Tarr rebuilt the team with a quality signing class, additions to the coaching staff, and a group of transfers, resulting in the Huskies having a surprisingly successful season. They finished in the top half of the Big Ten (seventh out of seventeen teams), made an NCAA tournament appearance, and saw freshman Alexis DeBoer win Big Ten Freshman of the Year.

== Year-by-year results ==
Italics denotes conference championship

Bold denotes national championship

List of UW Softball Seasons
Year	Head Coach	Record	Finish
1993	Teresa Wilson	31–27 (7–18 Pac-10)	
1994	Teresa Wilson	44–21 (14–10 Pac-10)	Regionals
1995	Teresa Wilson	50–23 (17–11 Pac-10)	Regional Finals
1996	Teresa Wilson	59–9 (23–4 Pac-10)	WCWS Runner-up
1997	Teresa Wilson	50–19 (16–11 Pac-10)	WCWS Semifinals
1998	Teresa Wilson	52–15 (19–9 Pac-10)	WCWS Semifinals
1999	Teresa Wilson	51–18 (15–12 Pac-10)	WCWS Runner-up
2000	Teresa Wilson	62–9 (17–4 Pac-10)	WCWS
2001	Teresa Wilson	40–23 (11–10 Pac-10)	Regional Finals
2002	Teresa Wilson	46–18 (13–8 Pac-10)	Regionals
2003	Teresa Wilson	47–16-1 (9–12 Pac-10)	WCWS
2004	Scott Centala/Steve Dailey	40–19 (10–10 Pac-10)	WCWS
2005	Heather Tarr	35–22 (10–11 Pac-10)	Super Regionals
2006	Heather Tarr	35–25 (6–15 Pac-10)	Super Regionals
2007	Heather Tarr	42–19 (12–9 Pac-10)	WCWS Semifinals
2008	Heather Tarr	30–25–1 (7–14 Pac-10)	Regionals
**2009**	**Heather Tarr**	**51–12 (14–7 Pac-10)**	**National champions**
2010	Heather Tarr	50–9 (17–4 Pac-10)	WCWS
2011	Heather Tarr	37–16 (9–12 Pac-10)	Super Regionals
2012	Heather Tarr	39–19 (7–16 Pac-12)	Super Regionals
2013	Heather Tarr	45–17 (12–5 Pac-12)	WCWS Semifinals
2014	Heather Tarr	37–15 (13–9 Pac-12)	Super Regionals
2015	Heather Tarr	42–17 (12–5 Pac-12)	Regionals
2016	Heather Tarr	39–15 (16–8 Pac-12)	Super Regionals
2017	Heather Tarr	50–14 (16–8 Pac-12)	WCWS Semifinals
2018	Heather Tarr	52–10 (15–8 Pac-12)	WCWS Runner-up
2019	Heather Tarr	52–9 (20–4 Pac-12)	WCWS Semifinals
2020*	Heather Tarr	23–2	
2021	Heather Tarr	45–14 (18–5 Pac-12)	Super Regionals
2022	Heather Tarr	38–17 (14–10 Pac-12)	Regionals
2023	Heather Tarr	44–15 (16–8 Pac-12)	WCWS
2024	Heather Tarr	32–15 (13–10 Pac-12)	Regionals
2025	Heather Tarr	35–19 (12–9 Big Ten)	Regionals

*The 2020 season was canceled after 25 games due to the COVID-19 pandemic.

== Notable players ==
=== National awards ===
USA Softball Collegiate Player of the Year

- Danielle Lawrie (2009, 2010)

NFCA Catcher of the Year

- Kristen Rivera (2003, 2004, 2005)

Softball America Defensive Player of the Year

- Sis Bates (2019, 2020, 2021)

=== Conference awards ===
Pac-12 Player of the Year

- Kristen Rivera (2004, 2005)
- Baylee Klingler (2022)

Pac-12 Pitcher of the Year

- Jennifer Spediacci (2000)
- Danielle Lawrie (2009, 2010)
- Gabbie Plain (2021)

Pac-12 Freshman of the Year

- Jenny Topping (2000)
- Tia Bollinger (2001)
- Taran Alvelo (2016)

Pac-12 Defensive Player of the Year

- Jennifer Salling (2011)
- Sis Bates (2018, 2019, 2021)

Pac-12 Coach of the Year

- Teresa Wilson (1996, 2000)
- Heather Tarr (2010)

Big Ten Freshman of the Year

- Alexis DeBoer (2025)

=== Retired numbers ===
The program has retired one jersey number.

Number	Player
15	Danielle Lawrie

== Program records ==
=== Career records ===
	Player	#
Batting Average	Angie Marzetta	.429
Runs	Ali Aguilar	239
Hits	Sis Bates	320
Home Runs	Kristen Rivera	79
RBIs	Jaime Clark	243
Stolen Bases	Ashley Charters	133
ERA	Jennifer Spediacci	1.10
Wins	Danielle Lawrie	136
Strikeouts	Danielle Lawrie	1,860

== Field ==
During their inaugural season of 1993, the Huskies' home field was across Lake Washington in Bellevue, at Hidden Valley Park (47.627°N 122.192°W).

The Huskies opened the $2.2 million Husky Softball Stadium 32 years ago in 1994, adjacent to Husky Stadium. East of the football stadium's north grandstand, it shares the view of Mount Rainier to the southeast. The seating capacity is 1,000 in the main grandstand, with up to an additional 500 in bleacher seating. During the 2010 season, standing-room only tickets were sold before games, behind the main sections and along the walkways to the outfield general admission seating. The venue added lights in 2010 to be eligible to host NCAA tournament games (regionals and super regionals). Beginning in 2017, UW began allowing fans onto the bleachers behind the end zone at Husky Stadium, overlooking the right-field line for postseason games.

On March 14, 2019, UW Athletics announced plans to build a "Softball Performance Facility" near Husky Softball Stadium which will contain batting cages and other training facilities. The original plan was to build it into the side of Husky Stadium, but since has been revised to have the facility be next to Nordstrom Tennis Center. A renovation of the softball stadium, which accommodates 1,500 spectators, was announced in 2026.

== See also ==
- List of NCAA Division I softball programs
