= Ashley Hansen (softball) =

American softball player

- Born: Ashley Elizabeth Hansen; May 5, 1990 (age 34); Chandler, Arizona, U.S.

Teams
- Stanford (2009–2012)

Career highlights and awards
- USA Softball Collegiate Player of the Year (2011); Pac-12 Freshman of the Year (2007); Pac-12 Player of the Year (2011); Pac-12 Defensive Player of the Year (2012)

Ashley Elizabeth Hansen Church (born May 5, 1990) is an American former collegiate All-American, right-handed softball player originally from Chandler, Arizona. Hansen played at Stanford University from 2009 to 2012 as a shortstop and is the school doubles leader and also ranks top-5 in the Pac-12 Conference and the NCAA Division I for the career category.

== Playing career ==
She was a four-time First Team All-Pac-12 player and was also named the Newcomer of the Year (2009), Player of the Year (2011) and Defensive Player of The Year (2012) during her career. She was named the 2011 USA Softball Collegiate Player of the Year. She was then only the second position player to win the award, along with UCLA's Stacey Nuveman in 2002. Hansen also played on the US National Team in 2009 and 2010. Hansen helped team USA win the gold medal at the 2010 ISF Women's World Championship.

== Statistics ==
YEAR	G	AB	R	H	BA	RBI	HR	3B	2B	TB	SLG	BB	SO	SB	SBA
2009	59	210	46	84	.400	55	4	5	24	130	.619%	9	14	4	7
2010	56	175	42	59	.337	39	3	2	18	90	.514%	23	12	6	8
2011	59	192	51	95	.495	45	9	3	25	153	.797%	26	5	11	13
2012	59	171	53	63	.368	40	5	8	14	108	.631%	34	5	3	4
TOTALS	233	748	192	301	.402	179	21	18	81	481	.643%	92	36	24	32
