= Jessica Mendoza =

American sports broadcaster and former softball player

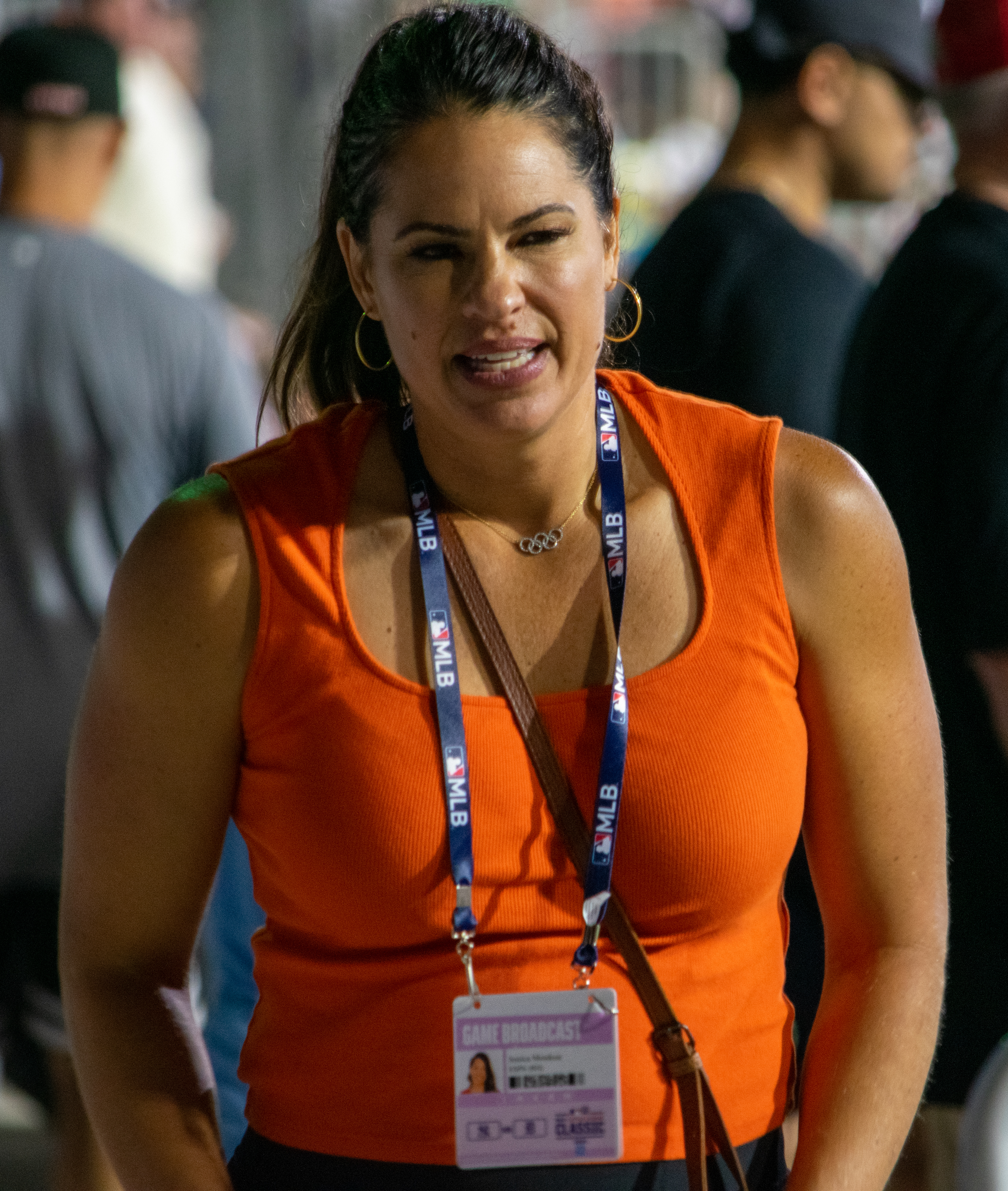
- Mendoza at the 2024 MLB Little League Classic

Personal information
- Full name: Jessica Ofelia Mendoza
- Born: November 11, 1980 (age 46) Camarillo, California, U.S.
- Height: 5 ft 9 in (1.75 m)
- Spouse: Adam Burks (m. 2006)

Sport
- Country: USA
- Sport: Softball
- Position: Outfielder
- College team: Stanford University
Medal record
Women's softball
Representing the United States
Olympic Games
Gold medal – first place	2004 Athens	Team competition
Silver medal – second place	2008 Beijing	Team competition
Pan American Games
Gold medal – first place	2003 Santo Domingo	Team competition
Gold medal – first place	2007 Rio de Janeiro	Team competition

Jessica Ofelia Mendoza (born November 11, 1980) is an American sportscaster and former softball player. Currently, she serves as an analyst for ESPN's coverage of Major League Baseball and Los Angeles Dodgers coverage on Spectrum SportsNet LA. As a softball outfielder, Mendoza was a collegiate four-time First Team All-American and two-time Olympic medalist. Mendoza played from 1999 to 2002 at Stanford and was a member of the United States women's national softball team from 2004 to 2010. She won a gold medal at the 2004 Olympics in Athens and a silver medal at the 2008 Olympics in Beijing. She played professionally in National Pro Fastpitch and was named 2011 Player of the Year and currently ranks in the top 10 for career batting average and slugging percentage.

Mendoza was a color commentator on ESPN's Sunday Night Baseball from 2016 to 2019. She remains an ESPN baseball analyst. Mendoza was named by fans and experts to the Greatest College Softball Team as an outfielder, one of only three to achieve the honor.

== Early life ==
Mendoza, a graduate of Adolfo Camarillo High School, was named the Los Angeles Times Player of the Year in 1998. During her junior and senior years, she was named Camarillo High School's Female Athlete of the Year. Mendoza was also a member of the high school basketball team and was the team MVP in her junior and senior years.

== Playing career ==
=== Stanford Cardinal ===
Mendoza attended Stanford University and played college softball for the Stanford Cardinal. She began her career as a 1999 First Team All-American and All-Pac-10 Conference honoree. Included with her recognition, she was named Pac-12 Newcomer of the Year. She broke the Cardinal records for season batting average and runs batted in (RBIs) while ranking top-10 for her hits.

On March 6, 1999, in defeating Illinois State, Mendoza had a single-game career high four hits off pitchers Corey Harris, Tammy Millian and Jamie Bagnall. Later that month, for the week of March 8, she was named National Fastpitch Coaches Association Player of the Week after hitting .631 (12/19) with 11 RBIs, 4 home runs, a triple and two doubles for a slugging percentage of 1.473.

As a sophomore, Mendoza again earn First Team citations for the NCAA Division I and the Pac-10. She added conference Player of the Year to her collection and broke her own record for batting average with a then-school and career-best .474, which also led the NCAA. She also claimed new records for hits, home runs, doubles, slugging, and stolen bases, which still rank top 10 for a season at Stanford.

From February 29 through March 22, 2000, Mendoza went on a school-record 19-consecutive-game hit streak. She batted .561 (32/57) to accompany four home runs and 15 RBIs, striking out just once with a slugging of .842.

Mendoza continued her success for the Cardinal with her third All-American and All-Pac-10 citations. She posted top-10 season records in virtually every category, still currently ranking second in single-season home runs and stolen bases.

Mendoza helped lead Stanford to their first-ever Women's College World Series appearance in 2001. The Cardinal were ousted on May 27 by the Arizona Wildcats despite wins over California Golden Bears and LSU Tigers. Mendoza was named to the All-Tournament Team for hitting .250 with an RBI and a double.

For her final season, Mendoza earned First Team citations for both conference and the NCAA. With her fourth straight honor from the NCAA, Mendoza joined elite company as only the fifth player to accomplish the feat then. That year she also tied her home run record and ranked top-10 in almost every other category.

The week of March 4, she was named NFCA's Player of the Week for a third time. She had hit .647 (11/17) with a home run, five doubles, and 1.117 slugging. Later that season, on May 8 with a 10–2 victory over the San Jose State Spartans, Mendoza drove in a career best six RBIs, four coming off her 50th career home-run swing with Carol Forbes pitching.

Mendoza currently holds career records in average, hits, home runs, slugging, and runs. Her career doubles (ranked 7th in the NCAA all-time), triples, RBIs and walks are still top-10 records. She was also named Pac-10 Player of the Week three times, a top 25 finalist for USA Softball Collegiate Player of the Year, and the Speedline Invitational Tournament MVP. Mendoza graduated from Stanford with a master's degree in social sciences and education.

=== Team USA ===
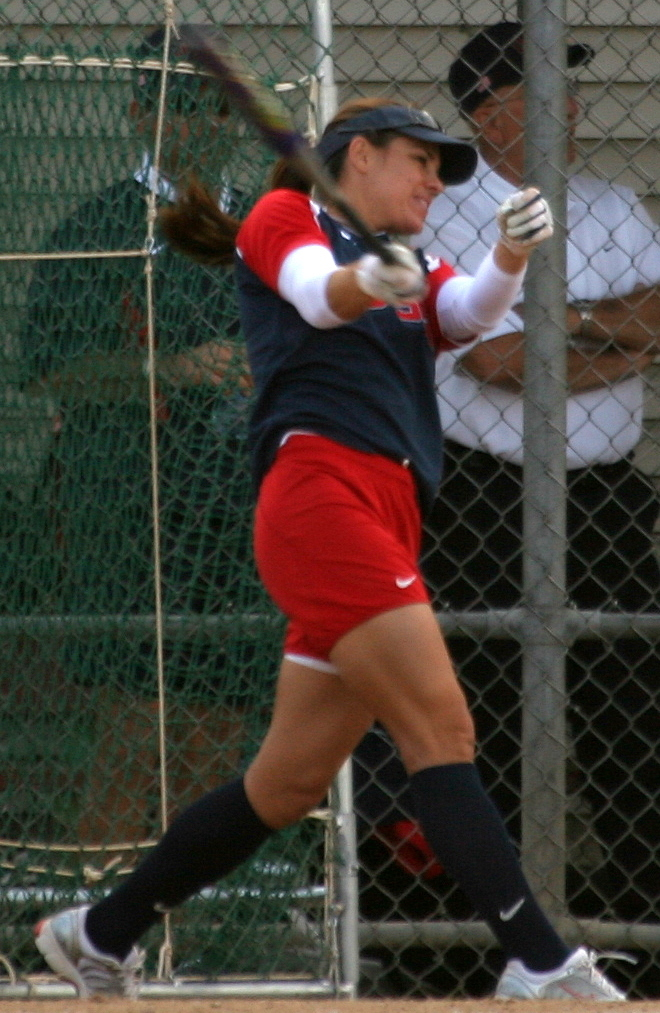
Mendoza in 2008

In 2004, Mendoza was a starting outfielder for Team USA at the 2004 Athens Olympic Games. Prior to the tournament, Mendoza hit .380 on the "Aiming For Athens" tour with 42 RBIs and 10 home runs. On August 14, Mendoza had two hits and two RBIs with a triple vs. Italy. She repeated her performance on August 19 against host Greece, with a double in that game. Team USA won the gold medal on August 23, though Mendoza was shut out by Australia. Overall, she went 5/20 (.250) scoring five times herself and hitting in 5 RBIs with a .400 slugging.

In 2008, Mendoza was again an outfielder for Team USA and led in almost every category on the "Bound 4 Beijing" Tour. She hit .495 with 107 RBIs and a .971 slugging. At the Beijing Olympic Games, she drove in 4 RBIs vs. Chinese Taipei on August 14. In the finale, Mendoza was again shut out and her team won the silver medal, losing to Japan on August 21.

In addition, Mendoza went directly onto the US team straight out of college. In 2003 and 2007, she was a gold medalist at the Pan American Games. She also won the silver medal at both the World Cup and Japan Cup. In 2006, Jessica was named the USA Softball "Female Athlete of the Year." She played for Team USA in the World Cup again in 2007, this time bringing home that gold medal. She went 11/18 with a double, three home runs, and 16 RBIs. Mendoza won the ISF Women's World Championship, hitting .500 with 5 home runs and 16 RBIs. In 2008, she was named to the Canada Cup All-Star Team. Mendoza declined an invitation to play for the US in 2011 to focus on National Pro Fastpitch.

=== National Pro Fastpitch ===
Mendoza joined the National Pro Fastpitch in 2005 with the Arizona Heat. She hit a league best (though in limited playing time) .491 her rookie year. After returning from maternity leave and a role with Team USA, Mendoza signed with the USSSA Pride. In her two seasons with the Pride, Mendoza hit .284 and .377, respectively. The same two years, her teams made the Cowles Cup championship, winning the title in 2010. Mendoza was shut out against the Chicago Bandits' trio of Kristina Thorson, Nikki Nemitz, and Jessica Sallinger. In the other finale, Mendoza was 2/4 with a double off Monica Abbott in a rematch with the Bandits, who ultimately won 10–3 on August 21. Once again, Mendoza and the Pride made the Cowles Cup Championship but lost to the Chicago Bandits. Mendoza was shut out but walked twice.

=== Athletes Unlimited ===
In June 2024, Athletes Unlimited announced that Mendoza will be advising them for the inaugural season of their Athletes Unlimited Softball League (AUSL), starting in 2025.

== Broadcasting career ==
=== ESPN ===
Mendoza works for ESPN and was a color analyst on Sunday Night Baseball telecasts. She also is an analyst for the Women's College World Series and has worked as a sideline reporter for ESPN College Football coverage.

On June 30, 2014, Mendoza began working on ESPN's Baseball Tonight. She appeared on the Monday editions of the show.

On June 16, 2015, Mendoza became the first female broadcaster in the booth for ESPN's College World Series coverage with Karl Ravech and Kyle Peterson. On August 24, Mendoza was the first female commentator for a Major League Baseball game in the history of ESPN, during a game between the St. Louis Cardinals and the Arizona Diamondbacks. Six days later, Mendoza filled in for suspended color commentator Curt Schilling for the Cubs–Dodgers game on Sunday Night Baseball. Cubs pitcher Jake Arrieta pitched a no-hitter in the game. John Kruk, Dan Shulman and Mendoza called the 2015 American League Wild Card Game on October 6, and Mendoza became the first female commentator in MLB postseason TV history.

On January 13, 2016, ESPN announced that Mendoza would join the Sunday Night Baseball broadcast team full-time, with Shulman and Aaron Boone. On October 6, 2017, Mendoza commentated for the 2017 NLDS, her first MLB post-season series, on ESPN Radio with broadcast partner Dave Flemming.

On March 5, 2019, the New York Mets announced that Mendoza joined the club as a senior advisor to general manager Brodie Van Wagenen. This led to conflict of interest concerns, leading the Los Angeles Dodgers to block Mendoza from entering their clubhouse as a media member before Dodgers games broadcast by ESPN in the 2019 season. The Dodgers had done the same with David Ross, who worked in the Chicago Cubs organization while also commentating for ESPN.

On January 16, 2020, she created controversy when she criticized former Houston Astros pitcher Mike Fiers for admitting to stealing signs during the team's World Series title run in 2017. The controversy surrounded the fact that she felt that Fiers should have reported his concerns to MLB authorities rather than simply share them with a reporter. Mendoza later backtracked and took to Twitter to clarify her comments. Amid concerns about a potential conflict of interest over her Mets role and the controversy of the Fiers comments, she later resigned from her role as Mets advisor and was dropped from Sunday Night Baseball, but signed a contract extension with ESPN on February 7, 2020, to remain a baseball analyst with the network.

In October 2020, Mendoza became the first female World Series analyst on any national broadcast platform; she was on ESPN's radio platform. In 2021, she was part of the broadcast team for NBC during the Tokyo 2020 Olympics.

=== Los Angeles Dodgers ===
In March 2022, it was announced that Mendoza would join the Spectrum SportsNet LA network to provide commentary for Los Angeles Dodgers games. She was a part of a group of network additions that included Eric Karros, Adrián González, José Mota, and Dontrelle Willis.

== Voice acting ==
Mendoza voices batting cage owner Dottie Doubleday in the Disney Jr. series Iron Man and His Awesome Friends.

== Personal life ==
The daughter of Karen and Gil Mendoza, Mendoza has one brother and two sisters. Her father played football for four years for Fresno State University. Mendoza is married to Adam Burks, with whom she has two sons. She is a second-generation Mexican-American.

Mendoza is a trustee and past president of the Women's Sports Foundation. She is an athletic ambassador for Team Darfur and board member of the National Education Association.

== In popular culture ==
For their first match of March 2019, the women of the United States women's national soccer team each wore a jersey with the name of a woman they were honoring on the back; Andi Sullivan chose to wear Mendoza’s name.

== Statistics ==
=== Stanford Cardinal ===
YEAR	G	AB	R	H	BA	RBI	HR	3B	2B	TB	SLG	BB	SO	SB	SBA
1999	62	195	38	81	.415	57	9	2	13	125	.641	12	22	6	8
2000	63	198	57	94	.474	41	13	1	20	155	.783	15	13	20	25
2001	71	205	70	83	.405	46	14	3	20	151	.736	32	23	31	35
2002	63	188	65	69	.367	44	14	3	17	134	.713	31	22	29	31
TOTALS	259	786	230	327	.416	188	50	9	70	565	.719	90	80	86	99

=== Team USA ===
YEAR	AB	R	H	BA	RBI	HR	3B	2B	TB	SLG	BB	SO	SB	SBA
2004	149	49	54	.362	47	10	7	8	106	.711	11	25	5	6
2008	230	99	110	.478	116	25	5	27	222	.965	26	26	8	10
TOTALS	379	148	164	.432	163	35	12	35	328	.865	37	51	13	16

=== NPF Arizona Heat & USSSA Pride ===
YEAR	AB	R	H	BA	RBI	HR	3B	2B	TB	SLG	BB	SO	SB
2005	59	23	29	.491	28	8	0	5	0	.983	11	4	10
2010	130	22	37	.284	28	7	1	8	68	.523	14	38	4
2011	130	39	49	.377	35	10	1	5	86	.661	17	26	11
2012	95	30	32	.337	39	9	2	2	65	.684	15	27	9
TOTALS	414	114	147	.355	130	34	4	20	277	.669	57	95	34

== Links ==
- NCAA Division I softball career .400 batting average list
- NCAA Division I softball career 50 home runs list
