= Lauren Lappin =

American softball player

Current position
- Title: Assistant coach
- Team: Arizona Wildcats

Biographical details
- Born: June 26, 1984 (age 42); Anaheim, California, U.S.

Playing career
- 2003–2006: Stanford
- 2010–2014: USSSA Pride

Coaching career (HC unless noted)
- 2021–present: Arizona (Asst.)

Accomplishments and honors

Awards
- 2× Pac-12 Defensive Player of the Year (2005, 2006)
Medal record
Women's softball
Representing United States
Olympic Games
Silver medal – second place	2008 Beijing	Team competition

Lauren Elizabeth Lappin (born June 26, 1984) is an American former collegiate All-American and medal-winning Olympian, professional All-Star softball player and current assistant coach for Arizona. She played college softball at Stanford and led them to a semifinal finish at the 2004 Women's College World Series. She later represented the United States women's national softball team at the 2008 Summer Olympics and won a silver medal. She then played in the National Pro Fastpitch from 2010 to 2014, winning two Cowles Cup championships with the USSSA Pride.

== Playing career ==
Lappin starred in softball at Loara High School in Anaheim, CA. She attended Stanford University from 2002 to 2006 playing shortstop and catcher for the softball team and graduated in December 2006 with a degree in American Studies.

She also played with the USA National Elite Team in 2003 and 2005 and was an alternate for the US Olympic Team in 2004. In the 2008 games, Lappin played in three of Team USA's matches and had a hit and drove in two runs.

Prior to the 2009 season, Lappin joined the Northwestern University team as a volunteer coach.

In 2010, Lappin joined National Pro Fastpitch for the USSSA Pride. She was traded to the Pennsylvania Rebellion in 2014 before retiring in March 2015.

On March 20, 2023, Lappin's number 37 became the first number retired by the Loara High School softball team. Also in 2023, she was inducted into the Stanford Athletics Hall of Fame.

== Personal life ==
Lappin is openly lesbian.

== Coaching career ==
On June 22, 2021, Lappin was named assistant coach for Arizona.

== Statistics ==
Stanford Cardinal
YEAR	G	AB	R	H	BA	RBI	HR	3B	2B	TB	SLG	BB	SO	SB	SBA
2003	61	180	31	59	.328	16	2	1	8	75	.416%	18	15	9	14
2004	68	204	44	73	.358	43	3	4	13	103	.505%	14	15	3	8
2005	59	172	52	57	.331	27	5	1	10	84	.488%	25	11	7	8
2006	60	177	42	58	.327	28	1	2	12	77	.435%	15	24	12	14
TOTALS	248	733	169	247	.337	114	11	8	43	339	.462%	72	65	31	44
