= Gabbie Plain =

Australian softball player

- Pitcher
- Born: 26 August 1998 (age 27); Sydney, Australia

Teams
- Washington (2018–2022)

Career highlights and awards
- WCWS All-Tournament team (2018); 2× First Team All-American (2019, 2021); Second Team All-American (2022); Third Team All-American (2018); Pac-12 Pitcher of the Year (2021)

Gabrielle "Gabbie" Plain is an Australian, former All-American college softball pitcher for Washington. In her freshman year, Plain led the Huskies to a runner-up appearance in the 2018 Women's College World Series, where they lost to Florida State, 2–0 in the finals. Plain represented Australia at the 2020 Summer Olympics.

== College career ==
During the 2021 season, Plain led the Pac-12 in wins, strikeouts, complete games, and strikeouts per seven innings while finishing third in ERA. She began the year 23–0, the longest undefeated start to a season in Washington history. Following an outstanding season she was named Pac-12 Pitcher of the Year and a first-team All-American.

Plain was a four-time All-American at Washington. She became the second player in Washington softball history, and the 40th in NCAA Division I softball history to do so. She finished her career at Washington with 108 wins, a 1.52 ERA and 1,068 strikeouts. Plain became the second Husky in program history to record 1,000 career strikeouts as well as the fourth Husky with 100-plus career wins.

== Team Australia ==
Plain represented Australia at the 2020 Summer Olympics. She allowed an earned run, 10 hits, five walks and struck out one batter in six innings. Australia placed fifth and was unable to medal for the first time in an Olympic softball tournament.

== Career statistics ==
Washington Huskies
YEAR	W	L	GP	GS	CG	SHO	SV	IP	H	R	ER	BB	SO	ERA	WHIP
2018	22	5	32	26	17	8	0	166.1	99	29	24	43	181	1.01	0.85
2019	24	2	38	27	16	12	4	186.0	98	38	33	43	246	1.24	0.76
2020	10	2	18	10	6	2	2	66.0	52	30	26	21	94	2.75	1.10
2021	32	4	44	37	26	13	3	237.1	146	56	49	49	337	1.44	0.82
TOTALS	88	13	132	100	65	35	9	655.2	395	153	132	156	858	1.41	0.84
