= Pac-12 Conference Softball Freshman of the Year =

Pac-12 Conference Freshman of the Year
- Awarded for: the most outstanding college softball freshman in the Pac-12 Conference
- Country: United States

History
- First award: 1994
- Most recent: Kaitlyn Terry, UCLA

The Pac-12 Conference Softball Freshman of the Year is a college softball award given to the Pac-12 Conference's most outstanding freshman player. The award has been given annually since 1994, when it was known as the Newcomer of the Year and players in their first year in the conference, including transfers, were eligible. The conference was known as the Pacific-10 before becoming the Pac-12 in 2011.

== Key ==
*	Awarded one of the following College National Player of the Year awards: NFCA National Freshman of the Year; Softball America Freshman of the Year

== Winners ==
Season	Player	School	Reference
1994	Leah Braatz	Arizona	
1995	Tanya Harding	UCLA	
1996	Julie Adams	UCLA	
1997	Stacey Nuveman	UCLA	
1998	Toni Mascarenas	Arizona	
1999	Jessica Mendoza	Stanford	
2000	Jenny Topping	Washington	
2001	Tia Bollinger	Washington	
2002	Lovie Jung	Arizona	
2003	Alicia Hollowell	Arizona	
2004	Caitlin Lowe	Arizona	
2005	Anjelica Selden	UCLA	
2006	Kaitlin Cochran	Arizona State	
2007	Jennifer Salling	Oregon	
2008	Krista Donnenwirth	Arizona State	
2009	Ashley Hansen	Stanford	
2010	Samantha Pappas	Oregon	
2011	Dallas Escobedo	Arizona State	
2012	Stephany LaRosa	UCLA	
2013	Kayla Bonstrom	Stanford	
2014	Katiyana Mauga	Arizona	
2015	Jenna Lilley	Oregon	
2016	Taran Alvelo; Megan Kleist	Washington; Oregon	
2017	Rachel Garcia	UCLA	
2018	Aaliyah Jordan	UCLA	
2019	Megan Faraimo	UCLA	
2021	Janelle Meoño	Arizona	
2022	Cydney Sanders	Arizona State	
2023	Jordan Woolery	UCLA	
2024	Kaitlyn Terry	UCLA	

== Winners by school ==
School	Winners	Years
UCLA	10	1995, 1996, 1997, 2005, 2012, 2017, 2018, 2019, 2023, 2024
Arizona	7	1994, 1998, 2002, 2003, 2004, 2014, 2021
Arizona State	4	2006, 2008, 2011, 2022
Oregon	4	2007, 2010, 2015, 2016
Stanford	3	1999, 2009, 2013
Washington	3	2000, 2001, 2016
California	0	—
Oregon State	0	—
Utah	0	—
