= Pac-12 Conference Softball Defensive Player of the Year =

Pac-12 Conference Defensive Player of the Year
- Awarded for: the most outstanding college softball defensive player in the Pac-12 Conference
- Country: United States

History
- First award: 2005
- Most recent: Tayler Biehl, Arizona; Paige Sinicki, Oregon

The Pac-12 Conference Softball Defensive Player of the Year is a college softball award given to the Pac-12 Conference's most outstanding defensive player. The award has been given annually since 2005. The conference was known as the Pacific-10 before becoming the Pac-12 in 2011.

== Winners ==
Season	Player	School	Reference
2005	Lauren Lappin	Stanford	
2006	Lauren Lappin (2)	Stanford	
2007	Caitlin Lowe	Arizona	
2008	Mindy Cowles; Rosey Neill	Arizona State; Stanford	
2009	Rosey Neill (2)	Stanford	
2010	Rosey Neill (3)	Stanford	
2011	Jennifer Salling	Washington	
2012	Ashley Hansen	Stanford	
2013	Shawna Wright	Washington	
2014	Kellie Fox	Arizona	
2015	Hallie Wilson	Arizona	
2016	Janelle Lindvall	Oregon	
2017	Hannah Flippen	Utah	
2018	Sis Bates	Washington	
2019	Sis Bates (2)	Washington	
2021	Sis Bates (3)	Washington	
2022	Briana Perez	UCLA	
2023	Allie Skaggs	Arizona	
2024	Tayler Biehl; Paige Sinicki	Arizona; Oregon	

== Winners by school ==
School	Winners	Years
Stanford	6	2005, 2006, 2008, 2009, 2010, 2012
Arizona	5	2007, 2014, 2015, 2023, 2024
Washington	5	2011, 2013, 2018, 2019, 2021
Oregon	2	2016, 2024
Arizona State	1	2008
UCLA	1	2022
Utah	1	2017
California	0	—
Oregon State	0	—
