= Rachel Garcia =

American softball player (born 1997)

Biographical details
- Born: March 30, 1997 (age 29); Lancaster, California, U.S.

Playing career
- 2017–2021: UCLA
- 2025–present: Texas Volts

Coaching career (HC unless noted)
- 2022: San Diego State (Volunteer asst.)
- 2023: UC San Diego (Pitching)

Accomplishments and honors

Awards
- NFCA National Freshman of the Year (2017); 2× NFCA National Player of the Year (2018, 2021); NFCA National Pitcher of the Year (2019); 2× USA Softball Collegiate Player of the Year (2018, 2019); Softball America Player of the Year (2019); Women's College World Series champion (2019); 2× WCWS All-tournament team (2018, 2019); WCWS Most Outstanding Player (2019); 2× Honda-Broderick Cup (2019, 2021); Pac-12 Freshman of the Year (2017); Pac-12 Pitcher of the Year (2019); 3× Pac-12 Player of the Year (2018, 2019, 2021)
Medal record
Women's softball
Representing the United States
Olympic Games
| Silver medal – second place | 2020 Tokyo | Team |
World Cup
| Silver medal – second place | 2024 Castions di Strada | Team |
Pan American Games
| Gold medal – first place | 2019 Lima | Team |
| Gold medal – first place | 2023 Santiago | Team |
World Games
| Gold medal – first place | 2025 Chengdu | Team |

Rachel Lauren Garcia (born March 30, 1997) is an American professional softball player for the Texas Volts of the Athletes Unlimited Softball League (AUSL). She previously served as the pitching coach for UC San Diego. She played college softball for the UCLA Bruins and led the Bruins to the 2019 Women's College World Series championship, where she was named the Most Outstanding Player.

Garcia won the Honda Sports Award, USA Softball Collegiate Player of the Year and NFCA National Player of the Year as the nation's best softball player in 2018 and 2019, and the Honda Cup as the nation's top female athlete in 2019 and 2021. Garcia represented Team USA at the 2020 Summer Olympics and won a silver medal. She was named one of the NCAA's greatest all-time pitchers. She was also voted to the Greatest College Softball Team at the utility position by fans and experts. Garcia was drafted first overall in the Athletes Unlimited Softball draft in 2021.

== Early life ==
Garcia attended Highland High School in Palmdale, California. During her senior season she posted a 26–2 record with a 0.20 earned run average and 418 strikeouts in 175 innings, adding 20 shutouts, including 10 no-hitters and six perfect games, and was named the 2015 Gatorade National Softball Player of the Year.

== College career ==
=== Freshman year ===
Garcia was redshirted her freshman year due to a knee injury she suffered in high school. As a redshirt freshman, she earned Pac-12 Freshman of the Year and NFCA National Freshman of the Year along with all-conference honors and a Second-Team All-American selection. Garcia led all Pac-12 pitchers in strikeouts and was tied for first in saves, third in wins, fourth in innings, fifth in opposing batting average (.203) and sixth in ERA, while she had 14 complete games and was a part of 23 shutouts, including five solo shutouts. In addition to pitching, she was one of the team's best hitters, as she tallied a .325 batting average, eight homers and 29 RBI and had 15 multiple-hit games and eight multi-RBI contests. She made her collegiate debut on February 10, collecting two hits in a game against the South Dakota Coyotes, while also throwing a run-rule shutout with seven strikeouts over the San Diego State Aztecs.

Garcia led the Bruins to a No. 5 seed at the World Series with her 23–9 win–loss record. In her debut at the Women's College World Series, Garcia pitched all of UCLA's games and left with a 1–1 record, falling in the second round. In her second game against Washington Huskies she struck out seven batters in a 1–0 loss.

=== Sophomore year ===
During her sophomore year, Garcia posted a 29–4 record, with a 1.31 ERA. She led all Pac-12 pitchers in wins, strikeouts and opposing batting average, was third in innings pitched and fifth in ERA, and achieved a career best in hits and batting average. She struck out 42 batters in 23 innings in four games at the Women's College World Series, and was named to the All-WCWS Team. Following an outstanding season, Garcia was named Pac-12 Conference Player of the Year, USA Softball Collegiate Player of the Year, NFCA National Player of the Year, and the Honda Sports Award for softball.

=== Junior year ===
During her junior year, Garcia posted a 29–1 record, with a 1.14 ERA and 286 strikeouts in 202 innings. She led the Bruins to the NCAA title, completing four of five victories pitched, throwing a shutout, a 10-inning win, batting .333 and leading with eight RBIs, including defeating the No. 1 Oklahoma Sooners back-to-back in the finale series. Following her performance she was named the Women's College World Series Most Outstanding Player. She ended the year on a nine-game win streak that would continue upon her return in the 2021 season.

Following her outstanding season, Garcia received numerous awards, including First Team All-Conference honors and becoming the first player to earn both Pac-12 Conference Player and Pitcher of the Year awards in the same season. She was also named NFCA National Pitcher of the Year, Softball America Player of the Year, ESPNW Softball Player of the Year, USA Softball Collegiate Player of the Year, Honda Sports Award for softball, Honda-Broderick Cup as the Female Athlete of the Year, and a First-Team All-American.

=== Senior year ===
Garcia missed the first month of the 2021 season due to an injury. She then won 16 consecutive decisions for a 25-game winning streak dating back to the 2019 season. She finished the regular season with an undefeated 14–0 record, a nation-leading 0.60 ERA, two saves and 124 strikeouts in 94 innings. She also ranked third in the Pac-12 with a .504 on-base percentage, and fourth with a .756 slugging percentage, while launching a conference-high seven home runs in Pac-12 play. She finished the year with an 18–3 record, with seven shutouts, 183 strikeouts and 29 walks in 136 1/3 innings.

Garcia ended the year with a return to the Women's College World Series for the fourth consecutive year, where UCLA was eliminated by Oklahoma. During the game she posted seven strikeouts, two hits, and drove in all the Bruins runs by hitting a home run in her final appearance. Following an outstanding season, she was named NFCA National Player of the Year, Pac-12 Player of the Year for the third consecutive year, D1Softball two-way player of the year, first-team all Pac-12, and a first-team All-American. She also was named a finalist for the USA Softball Collegiate Player of the Year, and won the Senior CLASS Award, Honda Sports Award for softball, and named Honda-Broderick Cup winner, becoming the first athlete to win back-to-back honors outright.

== Professional career ==
On January 29, 2025, Garcia was drafted fourth overall by the Volts in the inaugural Athletes Unlimited Softball League draft. On June 7, 2025, Garcia pitched the first complete game in AUSL history, allowing one run on four hits, with eight strikeouts.

== International career ==
Garcia returned to UCLA for her final collegiate year before joining the United States women's national softball team prior to the rescheduled Olympics in July, 2021. She represented Team USA at the 2020 Summer Olympics, where she made two appearances as a pinch-hitter in six games and won a silver medal. On August 31, 2023, Garcia was named to the U.S. women's national team for the 2023 Pan American Games.

Garcia represented the United States at the 2024 Women's Softball World Cup and won a silver medal. On August 3, 2026, she won a gold medal representing the United States at the USA Softball International Cup.

== Coaching career ==
On January 7, 2022, Garcia was named a volunteer assistant coach for the San Diego State Aztecs softball team for the 2022 season.

On October 7, 2022, Garcia was named pitching coach for the UC San Diego Tritons softball team for the 2023 season.

== Statistics ==
UCLA Bruins
| YEAR | G | AB | R | H | BA | RBI | HR | 3B | 2B | TB | SLG | BB | SO | SB |
| 2017 | 60 | 169 | 17 | 55 | .325 | 29 | 8 | 0 | 12 | 91 | .538% | 21 | 14 | 0 |
| 2018 | 61 | 174 | 29 | 59 | .339 | 54 | 11 | 0 | 6 | 98 | .563% | 23 | 26 | 0 |
| 2019 | 61 | 172 | 34 | 59 | .343 | 57 | 11 | 1 | 9 | 103 | .588% | 35 | 20 | 0 |
| 2021 | 45 | 120 | 35 | 41 | .341 | 35 | 13 | 0 | 5 | 85 | .708% | 30 | 20 | 0 |
| TOTALS | 227 | 635 | 103 | 214 | .337 | 175 | 43 | 1 | 32 | 377 | .593% | 109 | 80 | 0 |

| YEAR | W | L | GP | GS | CG | SHO | SV | IP | H | R | ER | BB | SO | ERA | WHIP |
| 2017 | 23 | 9 | 45 | 25 | 14 | 5 | 3 | 202.2 | 152 | 69 | 54 | 52 | 212 | 1.87 | 1.01 |
| 2018 | 29 | 4 | 39 | 27 | 21 | 9 | 2 | 208.0 | 104 | 48 | 39 | 48 | 315 | 1.31 | 0.73 |
| 2019 | 29 | 1 | 36 | 25 | 19 | 7 | 4 | 202.0 | 117 | 40 | 33 | 43 | 286 | 1.14 | 0.79 |
| 2021 | 18 | 3 | 29 | 18 | 12 | 7 | 2 | 136.1 | 91 | 35 | 27 | 29 | 183 | 1.39 | 0.88 |
| TOTALS | 99 | 17 | 149 | 95 | 66 | 28 | 11 | 749.0 | 464 | 192 | 153 | 172 | 996 | 1.43 | 0.85 |

Team USA
| YEAR | W | L | GP | GS | CG | SHO | SV | IP | H | R | ER | BB | SO | ERA | WHIP |
| 2020 | 1 | 0 | 4 | 0 | 0 | 0 | 0 | 7.0 | 6 | 2 | 2 | 1 | 7 | 2.00 | 1.00 |
| 2021 | 1 | 0 | 4 | 2 | 0 | 0 | 0 | 11.1 | 10 | 7 | 6 | 5 | 8 | 3.78 | 1.35 |
| TOTALS | 2 | 0 | 8 | 2 | 0 | 0 | 0 | 18.1 | 16 | 9 | 8 | 6 | 15 | 3.09 | 1.21 |

| YEAR | G | AB | R | H | BA | RBI | HR | 3B | 2B | TB | SLG | BB | SO | SB |
| 2020 | 2 | 5 | 0 | 2 | .400 | 2 | 0 | 0 | 0 | 2 | .400% | 3 | 1 | 0 |
| 2021 | 5 | 12 | 2 | 3 | .250 | 2 | 2 | 0 | 0 | 9 | .750% | 4 | 1 | 0 |
| Olympics | 2 | 2 | 0 | 0 | .000 | 0 | 0 | 0 | 0 | 0 | .000% | 0 | 0 | 0 |
| TOTAL | 9 | 19 | 2 | 5 | .263 | 4 | 2 | 0 | 0 | 11 | .579% | 7 | 2 | 0 |
