= Honda-Broderick Cup =

- Awarded for: A top female athlete, also reflecting leadership, academics and community service in the United States
- Country: United States
- Presented by: Honda Corporation (starting in 1987)
- First award: 1977
- Currently held by: Gretchen Walsh, Virginia Cavaliers swimming
- Website: Official website

The Honda-Broderick Cup is a sports award for college-level female athletes. The awards are voted on by a national panel of more than 1000 collegiate athletic directors. It was first presented by Tom Broderick, an American owner of a women's sports apparel company, in 1977, with the first award going to Lusia Harris, who played basketball at Delta State University. The Honda Corporation has presented the award since 1987. To be nominated, an athlete must have won the Honda Sports Award for her sport.

Winners are chosen in each of the 12 NCAA-sanctioned sports; three additional athletes are recognized as the Inspiration Award winner and Division II and III Athletes of the Year. All of these women are selected not only for their superior athletic skills, but also for their leadership abilities, academic excellence and eagerness to participate in community service.

Votes will be tabulated from over 900 NCAA-member schools, and the one athlete who is chosen as the outstanding Collegiate Woman Athlete of the Year will take home the Honda-Broderick Cup.

== Winners ==
Year	Winner	School	Sport
1976–77	Lusia Harris	Delta State	Basketball
1977–78	Ann Meyers	UCLA	Basketball
1978–79	Nancy Lieberman	Old Dominion	Basketball
1979–80	Julie Shea	North Carolina State	Track & Field
1980–81	Jill Sterkel	Texas	Swimming & Diving
1981–82	Tracy Caulkins	Florida	Swimming & Diving
1982–83	Deitre Collins	Hawaii	Volleyball
1983–84	Tracy Caulkins	Florida	Swimming & Diving
1983–84	Cheryl Miller	USC	Basketball
1984–85	Jackie Joyner	UCLA	Track & Field
1985–86	Kamie Ethridge	Texas	Basketball
1986–87	Mary T. Meagher	California	Swimming & Diving
1987–88	Teresa Weatherspoon	Louisiana Tech	Basketball
1988–89	Vicki Huber	Villanova	Track & Field
1989–90	Suzy Favor	Wisconsin	Track & Field
1990–91	Dawn Staley	Virginia	Basketball
1991–92	Missy Marlowe	Utah	Gymnastics
1992–93	Lisa Fernandez	UCLA	Softball
1993–94	Mia Hamm	North Carolina	Soccer
1994–95	Rebecca Lobo	UConn	Basketball
1995–96	Jennifer Rizzotti	UConn	Basketball
1996–97	Cindy Daws	Notre Dame	Soccer
1997–98	Chamique Holdsclaw	Tennessee	Basketball
1998–99	Misty May	Long Beach State	Volleyball
1999–00	Cristina Teuscher	Columbia	Swimming & Diving
2000–01	Jackie Stiles	Southwest Missouri State	Basketball
2001–02	Angela Williams	USC	Track & Field
2002–03	Natasha Watley	UCLA	Softball
2003–04	Tara Kirk	Stanford	Swimming & Diving
2004–05	Ogonna Nnamani	Stanford	Volleyball
2005–06	Christine Sinclair	Portland	Soccer
2006–07	Sarah Pavan	Nebraska	Volleyball
2007–08	Candace Parker	Tennessee	Basketball
2008–09	Courtney Kupets	Georgia	Gymnastics
2009–10	Megan Hodge	Penn State	Volleyball
2009–10	Maya Moore	UConn	Basketball
2010–11	Maya Moore	UConn	Basketball
2011–12	Brittney Griner	Baylor	Basketball
2012–13	Keilani Ricketts	Oklahoma	Softball
2013–14	Kim Jacob	Alabama	Gymnastics
2014–15	Missy Franklin	California	Swimming & Diving
2015–16	Breanna Stewart	UConn	Basketball
2016–17	Katie Ledecky	Stanford	Swimming & Diving
2017–18	Simone Manuel	Stanford	Swimming & Diving
2018–19	Rachel Garcia	UCLA	Softball
2019–20	Not awarded due to the COVID-19 pandemic		
2020–21	Rachel Garcia	UCLA	Softball
2021–22	Aliyah Boston	South Carolina	Basketball
2022–23	Caitlin Clark	Iowa	Basketball
2023–24	Caitlin Clark	Iowa	Basketball
2024–25	Gretchen Walsh	Virginia	Swimming & Diving
2025–26	Lauren Betts	UCLA	Basketball

== See also ==
- List of sports awards honoring women
- Honda Sports Award
