= Stanford Cardinal softball =

- 2026 Stanford Cardinal softball team
- Founded: 1994
- University: Stanford University
- Athletic director: Bernard Muir
- All-time Record: 1,088–678–3 (.616)
- Head coach: Jessica Allister (9th season)
- Conference: ACC
- Location: Stanford, California
- Home stadium: Stanford Softball Stadium (capacity: ~1,300)
- Nickname: Cardinal
- Colors: Cardinal and white

NCAA WCWS appearances
- 2001, 2004, 2023, 2024

NCAA super regional appearances
- 2005, 2006, 2008, 2009, 2011, 2022, 2023, 2024

NCAA Tournament appearances
- 1998, 1999, 2000, 2001, 2002, 2003, 2004, 2005, 2006, 2007, 2008, 2009, 2010, 2011, 2012, 2013, 2019, 2021, 2022, 2023, 2024, 2025, 2026

Regular-season conference championships
- 2005

The Stanford Cardinal softball team represents Stanford University in NCAA Division I college softball. The team participates in the Atlantic Coast Conference. The Cardinal are currently led by head coach Jessica Allister. The team plays its home games at Stanford Softball Stadium located on the university's campus. However, due to renovations, the Cardinal played its 2025 home games at Stanford Stadium, the university's on-campus football venue.

== History ==
=== Coaching history ===
Years	Coach	Record	%
1994–1996	Sandy Pearce	44–96	.314
1997–2014	John Rittman	750–351–3	.681
2015–2017	Rachel Hanson	49–104	.320
2018–Present	Jessica Allister	245–127	.659

== Championships ==
=== Conference Championships ===
Season	Conference	Record	Head coach
2005	Pac-12 Conference	13–8	John Rittman

== Coaching staff ==
Name	Position coached	Consecutive season at Stanford in current position
Jessica Allister	Head coach	9th
Jessica Merchant	Associate head coach	6th
Sara Groenewegen	Director of Softball Recruiting and Technology	1st (formerly assistant coach)
Danielle O'Toole-Trejo	Assistant coach	2nd
Jolene Henderson	Assistant coach	1st
Caleb Feist	Director of operations	5th

== Head coaching record ==
Record table
Season	Team	Overall	Conference	Standing	Postseason
Sandy Pearce (Independent) (1994–1994)
1994	Sandy Pearce	5–30			
Sandy Pearce (Pac-10 Conference) (1995–1996)
1995	Sandy Pearce	15–37	1–27	8th	
1996	Sandy Pearce	24–29	7–19	6th	
Sandy Pearce:		44–96 (.314)	8–46 (.148)		
John Rittman (Pac-10 Conference) (1997–2011)
1997	John Rittman	31–27–1	10–18	5th	
1998	John Rittman	41–18	17–11	3rd	NCAA Regional
1999	John Rittman	40–25	10–18	T–6th	NCAA Regional
2000	John Rittman	45–18	9–12	4th	NCAA Regional
2001	John Rittman	54–16–1	11–10	T–3rd	Women's College World Series (T–3rd)
2002	John Rittman	44–20	7–14	T–6th	NCAA Regional
2003	John Rittman	41–26	7–14	T–6th	NCAA Regional
2004	John Rittman	49–19	13–8	T–2nd	Women's College World Series (T–3rd)
2005	John Rittman	43–16	13–8	T–1st	NCAA Super Regional
2006	John Rittman	42–18	10–11	6th	NCAA Super Regional
2007	John Rittman	35–21–1	7–13–1	6th	NCAA Regional
2008	John Rittman	49–15	11–10	4th	NCAA Super Regional
2009	John Rittman	48–11	13–8	4th	NCAA Super Regional
2010	John Rittman	37–19	8–13	T–6th	NCAA Regional
2011	John Rittman	42–17	10–11	5th	NCAA Super Regional
John Rittman (Pac-12 Conference) (2012–2014)
2012	John Rittman	40–19	11–13	6th	NCAA Regional
2013	John Rittman	39–21	13–11	4th	NCAA Regional
2014	John Rittman	30–25	5–19	8th	
John Rittman:		750–351–3 (.681)	185–222–1 (.455)		
Rachel Hanson (Pac-12 Conference) (2015–2017)
2015	Rachel Hanson	17–37	2–22	9th	
2016	Rachel Hanson	13–35	0–24	9th	
2017	Rachel Hanson	19–32	2–22	9th	
Rachel Hanson:		49–104 (.320)	4–68 (.056)		
Jessica Allister (Pac-12 Conference) (2018–2024)
2018	Jessica Allister	24–31	3–21	8th	
2019	Jessica Allister	32–18	8–13	5th	NCAA Regional
2020	Jessica Allister	22–4	0–0	5th	Canceled due to COVID-19 pandemic
2021	Jessica Allister	33–22	9–12	6th	NCAA Regional
2022	Jessica Allister	39–22	11–13	4th	NCAA Super Regional
2023	Jessica Allister	47–15	14–10	T–4th	Women's College World Series (T–3rd)
2024	Jessica Allister	50–17	17–3	2nd	Women's College World Series (T–3rd)
Jessica Allister (Atlantic Coast Conference) (2025–present)
2025	Jessica Allister	42–13	16–8	T–4th	NCAA Regional
Jessica Allister:		289–142 (.671)	78–70 (.527)		
Total:		1,132–693–3 (.620)			
National champion Postseason invitational champion Conference regular season champion Conference regular season and conference tournament champion Division regular season champion Division regular season and conference tournament champion Conference tournament champion

== Notable players ==
=== National awards ===
USA Softball Collegiate Player of the Year

- Ashley Hansen (2011)
- NiJaree Canady (2024)

Softball America Pitcher of the Year

- NiJaree Canady (2024)

NFCA National Pitcher of the Year

- NiJaree Canady (2024)

NFCA National Freshman of the Year

- NiJaree Canady (2023)

Softball America Freshman of the Year

- NiJaree Canady (2023)

=== Conference awards ===
Pac-12 Player of the Year

- Jessica Mendoza (2000)
- Ashley Hansen (2011)

Pac-12 Pitcher of the Year

- NiJaree Canady (2024)

Pac-12 Freshman of the Year

- Jessica Mendoza (1999)
- Ashley Hansen (2009)
- Kayla Bonstrom (2013)

Pac-12 Defensive Player of the Year

- Lauren Lappin (2005, 2006)
- Rosey Neill (2008, 2009, 2010)
- Ashley Hansen (2012)

Pac-12 Coach of the Year

- John Rittman (2001, 2004)
- Jessica Allister (2019)
