= Hannah Flippen =

American softball player

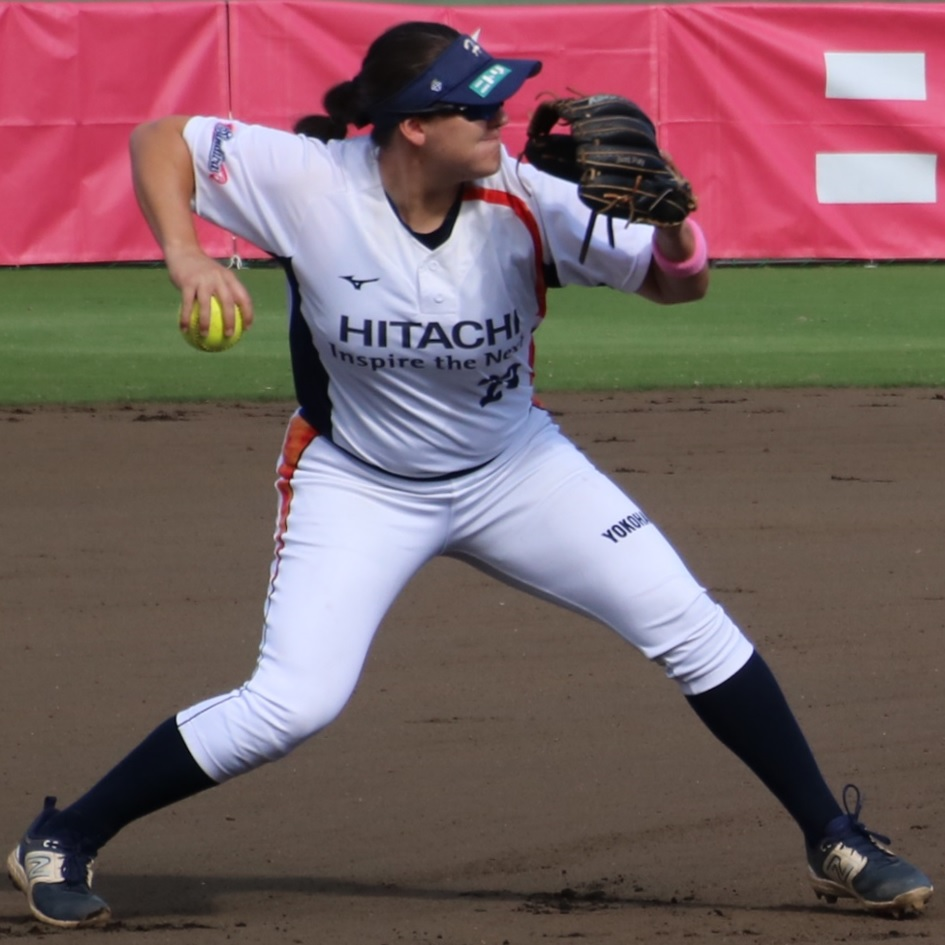

Utah Talons
- Infielder
- Born: March 7, 1995 (age 31); Bonita, California, U.S.
- Bats: Right Throws: Right

Teams
- Utah Utes (2014–2017); Scrap Yard Dawgs/Fast Pitch (2017–2019); Hitachi Sundiva (2022–2023); Utah Talons (2025–present)

Career highlights and awards
- 2× AUSL champion (2025, 2026); 2× Pac-12 Player of the Year (2016, 2017); Pac-12 Defensive Player of the Year (2017); NPF Champion (2017); All-NPF Team (2019)
Medals
Women's softball
Representing the United States
World Cup
Silver medal – second place	2024 Castions di Strada	Team
World Games
Gold medal – first place	2022 Birmingham	Team
Gold medal – first place	2025 Chengdu	Team

Hannah Irene Flippen (born March 7, 1995) is an American professional softball player for the Utah Talons of the Athletes Unlimited Softball League (AUSL). She played college softball at the University of Utah, where she was a three-time All-American. Flippen is a member of for the United States women's national softball team, and competed at the 2017 World Cup of Softball. She was also chosen to play for the 2018 Japan All-Star Series and World Cup of Softball team.

== Early life ==
Flippen was born on March 7, 1995, in Bonita, California to parents John and Mary Lou Flippen. Flippen's mother was an All-American at Utah State University. Flippen attended Bonita Vista High School and graduated in 2013, where she hit .411 on her career.

== College career ==
After graduating from High School, Flippen attended the University of Utah, graduating in May 2017 with a degree in psychology. In 2016, Flippen was an All-American, as well as the Pac-12 Player of the Year. In 2017, she was named Pac-12 Defensive Player of the Year.

== Professional career ==
Flippen has played professionally since 2017 with various organizations including National Pro Fastpitch, the Japan Diamond Softball League, and Athletes Unlimited. Flippen played as part of AU's Pro Softball debut in 2020, returning each year for the five-week Championship Season (as of August 2024). In 2022 she was the AU Defensive Player of the Year.

On January 29, 2025, Flippen was drafted in the fourth round, 16th overall, by the Talons in the inaugural Athletes Unlimited Softball League draft. During the 2025 AUSL season, she hit .273 with 21 hits, four doubles, three home runs and 20 RBI, and helped the Talons win the inaugural AUSL championship.

== International career ==
Flippen was selected to play for the United States women's national softball team in 2017, after playing with the Elite Team in 2016. She represented the United States at the 2024 Women's Softball World Cup and won a silver medal. On August 3, 2026, she won a gold medal representing the United States at the USA Softball International Cup.

== Statistics ==
=== Utah Utes ===
YEAR	G	AB	R	H	BA	RBI	HR	3B	2B	TB	SLG	BB	SO	SB	SBA
2016	57	160	50	66	.413	34	13	2	6	N/A	.719%	32	11	15	15
TOTALS	57	160	50	66	.413	34	13	2	6	N/A	.719%	32	11	15	15
