= List of Senior CLASS Award softball winners =

Senior CLASS Award for softball
- Awarded for: the outstanding senior NCAA Division I Student-Athlete of the Year in softball
- Country: United States
- First award: 2007
- Currently held by: Aly Harrell, Marshall
- Website: http://www.seniorclassaward.com/softball/

The Senior CLASS Award is presented each year to the outstanding senior NCAA Division I Student-Athlete of the Year in softball. The award was established in 2007 and went to Caitlin Lowe of the Arizona Wildcats.

Year	Winner	School	Ref.
2007	Caitlin Lowe	Arizona	
2008	Angela Tincher	Virginia Tech	
2009	Stacey Nelson	Florida	
2010	Charlotte Morgan	Alabama	
2011	Chelsea Kelly	Radford	
2012	Valerie Arioto	California	
2013	Kayla Braud	Alabama	
2014	Madison Shipman	Tennessee	
2015	Lacey Waldrop	Florida State	
2016	Haylie McCleney	Alabama	
2017	Alex Powers	Florida State	
2018	Meghan Gregg	Tennessee	
2019	Katie Reed	Kentucky	
2020	Not awarded due to COVID-19 pandemic		
2021	Rachel Garcia	UCLA	
2022	Aly Harrell	Marshall	

== See also ==
- List of sports awards honoring women
- NCAA Division I softball tournament
