= Caitlin Lowe =

American softball player (born 1985)

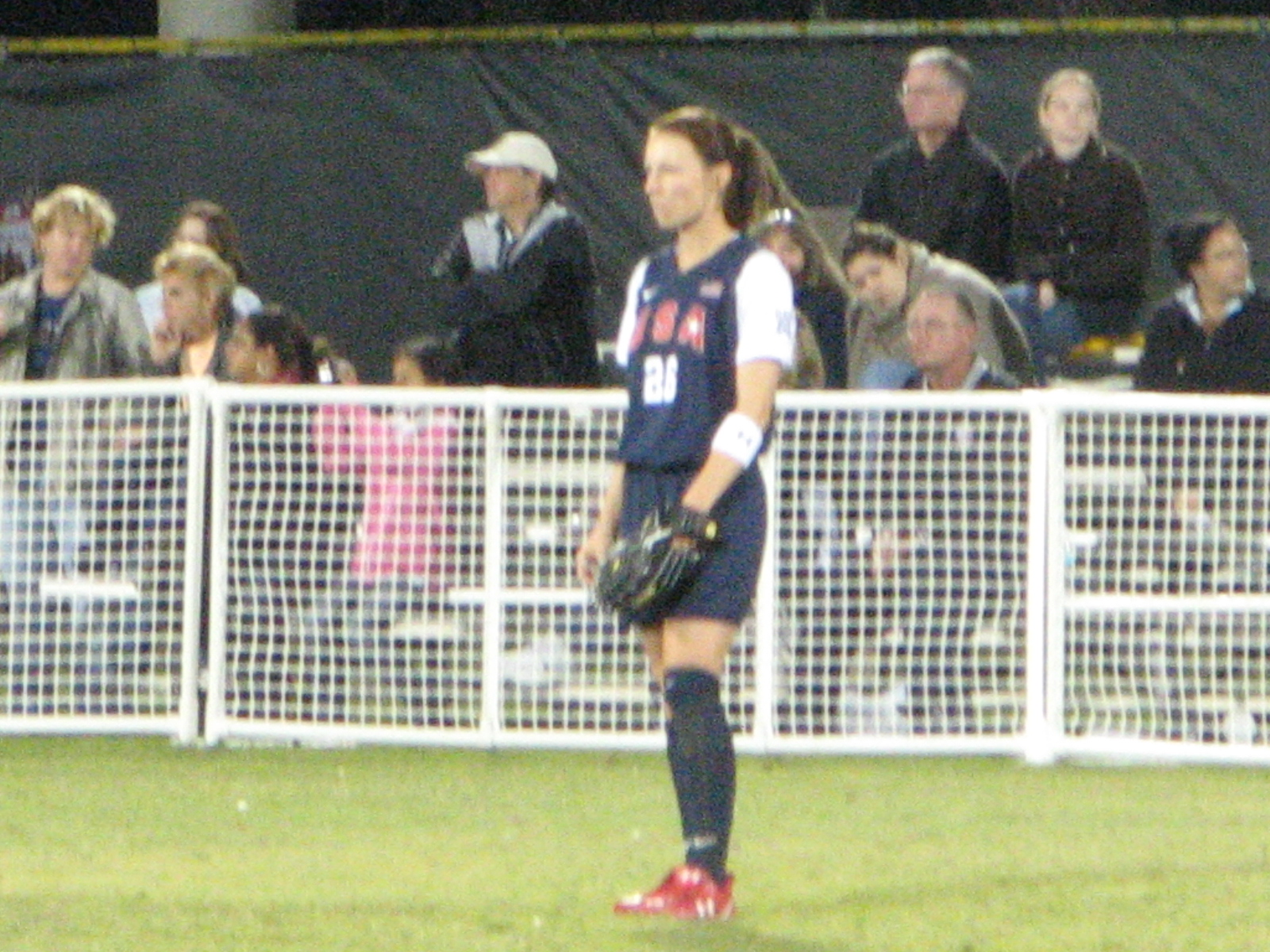
- Lowe playing outfield in Altamonte Springs in February 2008

Current position
- Title: Head coach
- Team: Arizona
- Conference: Big 12

Biographical details
- Born: February 6, 1985 (age 41); Tustin, California, U.S.
- Education: University of Arizona

Playing career
- 2004–2007: Arizona
- 2009–2014: USSSA Pride

Coaching career (HC unless noted)
- 2014: Arizona (vol. asst.)
- 2015–2017: Arizona (asst.)
- 2018–2021: Arizona (associate)
- 2022–Present: Arizona

Head coaching record
- Overall: 190–96-1 (.664)
Medal record
Women's softball
Representing United States
Olympic Games
Silver medal – second place	2008 Beijing	Team competition
Pan American Games
Gold medal – first place	2007 Rio de Janeiro	Team competition
World Cup of Softball
First place	2007 Oklahoma City	Team competition

Caitlin Faith Lowe-Nagy (born February 6, 1985) is the head coach of the Arizona Wildcats softball team. Lowe is a former collegiate four-time first team All-American and medal winning Olympian. She played college softball for Arizona and led her team in back-to-back Women's College World Series championships in 2006 and 2007. She won a silver medal at the 2008 Summer Olympics. Lowe played with National Pro Fastpitch's USSSA Pride for six seasons, winning three titles and being named 2012 Player of the Year, before officially retiring in 2015.

She is one of select players in NCAA Division I history to have accumulated over 300 hits, 200 runs and 100 stolen bases while batting .400 in her career. Recently, she was only one of 3 named by both the fan vote and experts to the Greatest College Softball Team All-Time, in the outfield.

== Early life ==
At Foothill High School in North Tustin, California, Caitlin was selected as an All-American four years in a row, and helped lead her team to state and national championships in 2000. In addition, she led the school to league championships in 2001, 2002 and 2003. In 2001, she received the All-League and Foothill High School MVP Awards and in 2003, she received the Orange County "Player of the Year" Award.

== Arizona Wildcats ==
For her freshman season at the University of Arizona, Lowe earned First Team All-American status and was named the Pac-10 Newcomer of the Year and was a top-10 finalist for USA Softball Collegiate Player of the Year. She jumped into top-10 rankings in Wildcat history for her run and stolen base totals and posted career highs in doubles and base on balls; Lowe also led the conference in stolen bases.

The sophomore continued her success by earning all-season honors from both the NFCA and the Pac-10, including being named conference Player of the Year. Her career best season batting average still ranks second all-time and her hits total top-10 at Arizona (both topped the conference year), leading to a finalist spot for the Honda and USA Softball National Collegiate Player of The Year. She also set career highs in home runs, triples and slugging percentage.

On February 26, she hit a career high four hits against the Louisiana Tech Lady Techsters in a 7–0 win. The next month on March 27, Lowe would drive in four RBIs for another career high over Louisiana–Lafayette.

Lowe was named 2006 First Team All-American and Pac-10 for a third consecutive year. She posted another top-10 school record for her 33 stolen bases and was caught just twice that year while also achieving a high in RBIs and again leading the conference for stolen bases.

From February 25 through March 18, Lowe achieved a 15 consecutive game hit streak. She batted .510 (26/51) and had 12 RBIs, a home run, four triples and two doubles to accompany a slugging percentage of over .750%, eventually ended by Cat Osterman on March 19. Starting in a doubleheader sweep of the Oregon Ducks on May 12, Lowe stole two bags in the games to begin a consecutive stolen bases streak that would reach into her senior season.

The Wildcats made it into the Women's College World Series as the No. 2 seed and eventually trumped the Northwestern Wildcats in the finals, outscoring them a combined 13–0 over the two-game series; Lowe scored four of those runs. Lowe went 2/4 in the June 6 finale and was named to the All-Tournament Team scoring a then new series record 8 runs.

For a final season Lowe was named All-American, all-conference and newly bestowed with the Pac-10 Defensive Player of the Year award. She also stole a career high, school season second best and Pac-10 leading 49 bags, being caught just once. Her resumed streak of consecutive stolen bases concluded on May 19 when the one time she was thrown out was by Chelsea Bramlett of Mississippi State Bulldogs. To that point, Lowe had amassed 47 consecutive stolen bases and 54 overall for the NCAA ninth best streak all-time.

Lowe and the Wildcats returned to defend their title at the 2007 WCWS. After riding the arm of tournament MVP Taryne Mowatt and escaping elimination through four games (three straight), Lowe won another National Championship defeating the Tennessee Lady Vols 5–0 on June 6. Lowe ended her career with a perfect day at the plate going 4/4 off USA Softball Collegiate Player of The Year Monica Abbott. She was named All-Tournament hitting .345 with two RBIs and three doubles.

Lowe is the Wildcat's career leader in stolen bases, second in batting average and top-10 in hits, triples and runs. She ranks top-10 for all the same marks in the since renamed Pac-12, minus the triples. At Arizona, she was known for her welcoming and volunteering nature and helped other student athletes become acclimated to college through Arizona’s Peer Athletic Leaders (PAL). Her senior year, Caitlin was awarded the inaugural Lowe's Senior CLASS Softball Award, which acknowledges personal qualities that define a complete student athlete, such as excellence in the classroom, character and community, as well as success in athletic competition. Lowe is one of only six Wildcat players to be named an NFCA All-American in each of her four years with the program and joined Leah Braatz (1994, 95, 97, 98) as the only player in Arizona history to be awarded first-team All-America all four years.

== Team USA ==
Caitlin began her national career in 2004 as a member of the USA Schutt Elite Team at the Canada and Champions Cups, where she scored a team-high 16 runs. In 2005, Caitlin joined the United States National Team and helped the team earn silver medals in the Japan and World Cups. She was one of the youngest members of the 2006 World Championship team. Caitlin also helped the team win the World Cup in 2006 and 2007, where she posted a team high 6 hits with three runs scored. She earned a gold medal at the 2007 Pan American Games, and that season tied for the most hits, a team high with two triples and scored 21 runs, the second best on the team. That year, Caitlin's impressive base running and speed also earned her a perfect 9 stolen bases in 9 attempts.

Caitlin Lowe has been a member of the U.S. Women's National Softball Team since 2005. USA Softball Head Coach Mike Candrea says, "She's all out all the time and plays the game like a giant."

Leading up the 2008 Olympics, Lowe hit .455 on the Bound 4 Beijing Tour and was tied leading the team in triples, second in stolen bases and had a perfect fielding percentage. At the Games, Lowe began her tournament with a 3/4 effort in a run-rule of Venezuela, including hitting the first-ever inside-the-park home run in Games history. On August 20, Lowe and Team USA went extra innings in the semifinals vs. Japan and she hit the RBI single to take the lead before scoring on Crystl Bustos' winning three-run homer. She had two hits in the gold medal game but made the last out in the 3–1 loss. Lowe was tied in at-bats for the tournament and hit .357 overall.

== National Pro Fastpitch ==
Lowe played her first two seasons in limited action but was later named All-NPF from 2012 to 2014, including nabbing the Player of The Year and Diamond Spikes Awards in 2012. In 2012, she also led the league in batting average with a career best and set a personal best with four hits on August 25 vs. the Akron Racers. She had a hit in the championship finale, though her team was bested by the Chicago Bandits. The Pride also made it to the Cowles Cup Championship every other year of her career, winning titles in 2010, 2013–2014, Lowe playing in all except 2009–2010. On August 8, 2013, Lowe set another career high with 3 RBIs in a victory over the NY NJ Comets. She played her last season setting a career high in doubles. She also had a career best 22 consecutive game hit streak from July 13–August 16: .408 (31/76) with 7 RBIs and 7 doubles, slugging .500%.

Lowe announced her retirement as a player after the 2014 season. Subsequently, the Pride announced the Lowe would be inducted into the USSSA Hall of Fame, and that her jersey number 26 would be retired.

== Coaching career ==
On June 7, 2021, Lowe was named the head coach of the Arizona Wildcats softball program, following the retirement of former head coach Mike Candrea. Lowe spent the last nine seasons under Candrea following a professional career with the USSSA Pride. Lowe served as the program's director of operations in 2013 and then the volunteer assistant coach in 2014, before joining the coaching staff full time in 2015. She served as the team's associate head coach from 2018 to 2021.

== Head coaching record ==
The following lists Lowe-Nagy's record as a head coach at the NCAA level.

Record table
Season	Team	Overall	Conference	Standing	Postseason
Arizona Wildcats (Pacific-12 Conference) (2022–2024)
2022	Arizona	39–22	8–16	T-7th	Women's College World Series
2023	Arizona	29–25	6–18	8th	
2024	Arizona	37–18–1	13-11	5th	NCAA Super Regionals
Arizona:		105–65–1 (.617)	27–45 (.375)		
Arizona Wildcats (Big 12 Conference) (2024–present)
2025	Arizona	48–13	17–7	2nd	NCAA Regional
2026	Arizona	37–18	16–8	T–2nd	NCAA Regional
Arizona:		190–96–1 (.664)	60–60 (.500)		
Total:		190–96–1 (.664)			
National champion Postseason invitational champion Conference regular season champion Conference regular season and conference tournament champion Division regular season champion Division regular season and conference tournament champion Conference tournament champion

== Personal life ==
She graduated from the University of Arizona in the fall of 2007 with a degree in psychology and a minor in communications. Lowe comes from an athletic family. She is the daughter of Dave and Dawn Lowe and has a brother Tanner and three sisters Whitney, Paige, and McKenna Lowe. Paige and McKenna are part of the Oregon State University softball team.

Four-time Wildcat All-American Caitlin Lowe returned and joined Arizona's coaching staff as the team's volunteer assistant coach in 2013 after serving as the program's director of operations in 2012. Lowe will be working with the slappers, the outfielders and base running. Lowe retired officially from softball in 2015.

In 2015, Lowe married Paul Nagy who is the assistant soccer coach at the University of Arizona. Lowe and Nagy have two children together, Harper and Beckham.

== Statistics ==
Arizona Wildcats
YEAR	G	AB	R	H	BA	RBI	HR	3B	2B	TB	SLG	BB	SO	SB	SBA
2004	61	190	76	83	.437	25	4	1	9	106	.558%	29	20	47	50
2005	57	196	57	100	.510	25	5	4	2	125	.637%	20	20	27	30
2006	56	186	52	79	.424	27	2	4	8	101	.543%	17	21	33	35
2007	64	215	57	89	.414	24	1	3	5	103	.479%	15	25	49	50
TOTALS	238	787	242	351	.446	101	12	12	24	435	.552%	81	86	156	165

Team USA
YEAR	AB	R	H	BA	RBI	HR	3B	2B	TB	SLG	BB	SO	SB	SBA
2008	239	91	106	.443	47	7	6	12	151	.632%	16	19	17	19

USSSA Pride (NPF)
YEAR	AB	R	H	BA	RBI	HR	3B	2B	TB	SLG	BB	SO	SB
2009	46	6	10	.217	3	0	0	0	0	.217%	2	10	3
2010	38	9	14	.368	5	0	0	3	17	.447%	1	5	1
2011	105	17	31	.295	4	0	0	3	34	.324%	5	13	6
2012	130	36	59	.454	11	0	1	6	67	.515%	12	14	14
2013	180	40	60	.333	23	0	0	5	65	.361%	13	25	17
2014	155	31	55	.355	15	0	0	10	63	.406%	6	16	6
TOTALS	654	139	229	.350	61	0	1	27	256	.391%	39	83	47

== Awards and championships ==
Year	Team	Championship/Medal
2001–2003	Foothills High School	National Champion
2000	All-CIF	Second Team
2001	Foothill High School Softball Team	MVP
2001	All-League	MVP
2002	ASA U-18 Gordon's Panthers	Gold Runner-Up
2001–2003	League Championship	Champion
2003	Orange County	Player of the Year
2003	All-League	First Team
2003	All-County	First Team
2003	All-State	First Team
2003	All-CIF	First Team
2003	All-American	First Team
2003	USA Softball	Player of the Week
2003	All Pac	First Team
2003	Pacific Region	First Team
2003	Pac 10	Newcomer of the Year
2003	USA Softball	Top 10 Finalist for Player of the Year
2004	USA Schutt Elite Team	Canada Cup
2004	USA Schutt Elite Team	Champions Cup
2004	USA Softball	Top 3 Finalist for Player of the Year
2004	All-PAC 10	First Team
2004	All Pacific Regions	Honors
2004	All-American	First Team
2004	World Cup	Silver Medalist
2005	Japan Cup	Silver Medalist
2005	All-PAC 10	First Team
2005	All Pacific Regions	Honors
2005	USA Softball	Top 10 Finalist for Player of the Year
2005	All-American	First Team
2005	All-Women's College World Series Team Selection
2006	NCAA National Championship	Champion
2007	All-American	First Team
2007	All-PAC 10	First Team
2007	PAC-10 Conference	Player of the Year
2007	Lowe's	Senior CLASS Award
2007	NCAA National Championship	Champion
2007	Canada Cup	Champion
2007	World Cup	Champion
2007	Pan-American Games	Champion
2008	Olympics	Silver Medalist

== See also ==
- NCAA Division I softball career .400 batting average list
