= Stacey Nuveman-Deniz =

American softball coach (born 1978)

Stacey Nuveman Deniz
Current position
- Title: Head coach
- Team: San Diego State
- Conference: Pac-12
- Record: 78–33 (.703)

Biographical details
- Born: April 26, 1978 (age 48); Los Angeles, California, U.S.
- Education: UCLA

Playing career
- 1998–2002: UCLA
- Positions: Catcher & Hitter

Coaching career (HC unless noted)
- 2007–2008: College of the Sequoias (Asst.)
- 2018: Chicago Bandits
- 2008–2012: San Diego State (Asst.)
- 2013–2021: San Diego State (Associate head coach)
- 2025: Chicago Bandits
- 2022–present: San Diego State

Head coaching record
- Overall: 78–33 (.703)
- Tournaments: NCAA: 6–4 (.600)

Accomplishments and honors

Championships
- Mountain West Conference Champions (2022); Mountain West Tournament Champions (2023)

Awards
- Mountain West Conference Coach of the Year (2022)
Medal record
Women's softball
Representing the United States
Olympic Games
Gold medal – first place	2000 Sydney	Team competition
Gold medal – first place	2004 Athens	Team competition
Silver medal – second place	2008 Beijing	Team competition

Stacey "Nuvey" Nuveman Deniz (born April 26, 1978) is an American softball coach and former player who is the head coach of the San Diego State Aztecs softball team at San Diego State University (SDSU). She previously served as the head coach of the Chicago Bandits for the inaugural 2025 season of the Athletes Unlimited Softball League (AUSL). She played for the UCLA Bruins at the catcher position on-and-off from 1997 to 2002, winning a national championship in 1999. She also won two Olympic gold medals and one silver medal for Team USA.

She holds the Pac-12 career records for batting average and slugging percentage; she simultaneously holds the NCAA career records for total bases and intentional walks (81). Nuveman Deniz is also one of nine NCAA players to possess a career .400 batting average along with at least 200 RBIs, 50 home runs and an .800 slugging percentage and was named #4 Greatest College Softball Player. She is also a USA Softball Hall of Fame honoree. Nuveman Deniz has worked for Nike, ESPN, Schutt, and other sports companies.

== Early life ==
Stacey Nuveman Deniz grew up in Southern California. She began playing the sport of softball at age 10. She played travel ball for several teams, including Gordon's Panthers, where she helped the team win the ASA 18-under Gold National Championship. At St. Lucy's Priory High School, she led the Lady Regents to a CIF title. While at St. Lucy's, she lettered in softball, basketball, volleyball and also served as student body president. Her excellence at St. Lucy's led to her receiving a softball scholarship at UCLA.

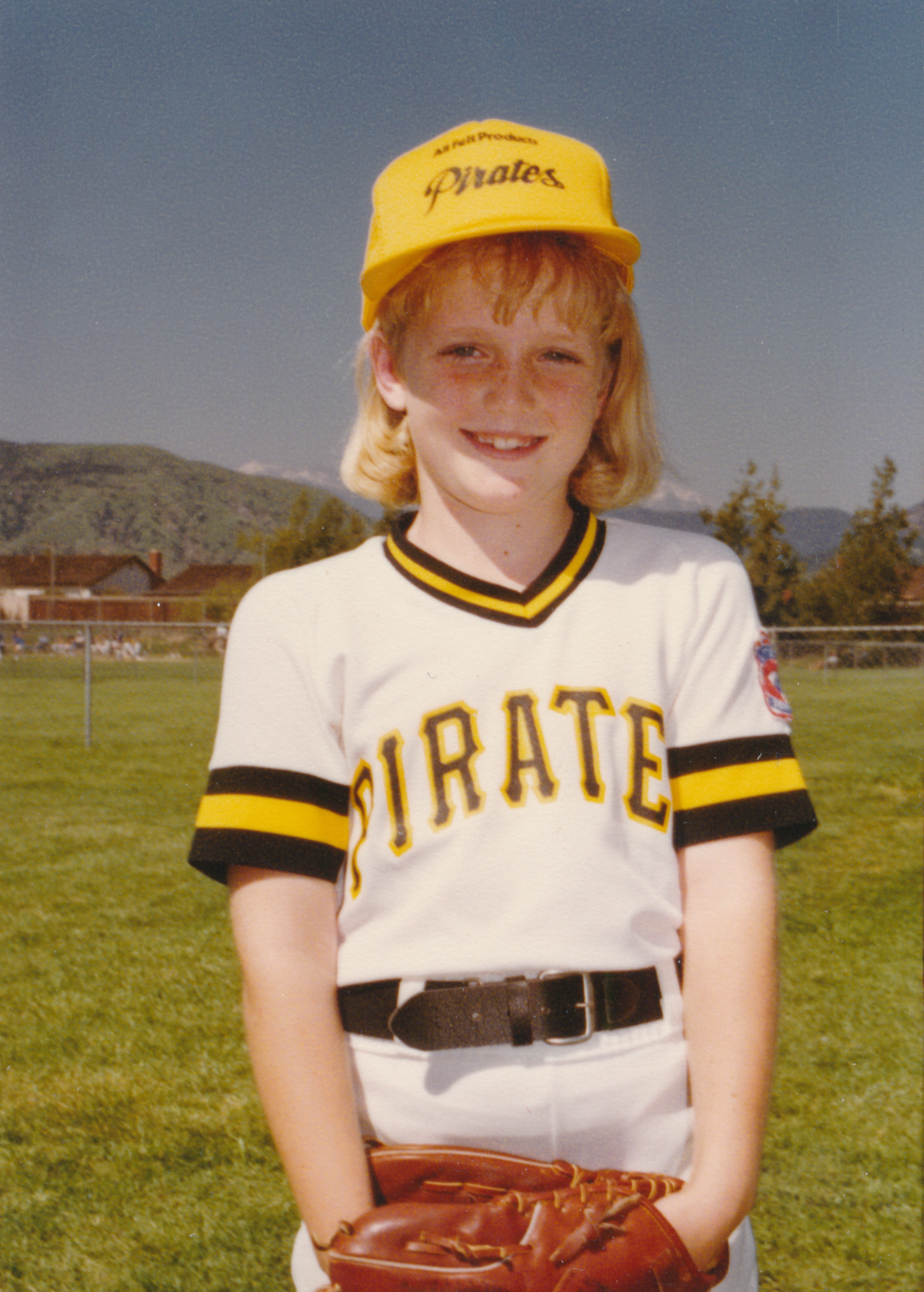
Deniz 0027

== UCLA Bruins ==
=== 1997 ===
Stacey Nuveman Deniz began her career in honors by earning National Fastpitch Coaches Association First Team All-American, Pac-10 Conference First Team and "Newcomer of The Year" awards. She also immediately impacted the school record book by notching new season records for home runs and RBIs, while placing third in both batting average and hits for her freshman campaign. Following the season she was named Pac-12 Freshman of the Year.

Beginning February 15-April 9, Nuveman Deniz went on a career and then school record 28 consecutive games hitting streak. The Bruins made it into the Women's College World Series where Nuveman Deniz made the All-Tournament Team and in the finale had her sixth tournament hit vs. eventual champion Nancy Evans of the Arizona Wildcats.

=== 1999 ===
After red-shirting the 1998 season, Nuveman Deniz again garnered season honors that included Pac-10 Player of the Year and NFCA Catcher of the Year. Nuveman Deniz led the Bruins with new school records for home runs, RBIs, walks and slugging percentage. The home runs and RBIs were the NCAA year's best, are the all-time Sophomore Class records as well as ranking top-10 for a season all-time. Her batting average was a UCLA top-5 record. She also was just the second player in conference history to garner the Triple Crown for the best average, RBI and home run totals.

On February 19, Nuveman Deniz hit a single-game career-high 5 hits and drove in 5 RBIs vs. the Hawaii Rainbow Wahine. The very next day, she bettered her game RBIs by nabbing one more (6) vs. the Pacific Tigers for another career-best and achieved 5 more hits, tying the NCAA record for consecutive hits; the record is now a top-5 single-game record. In defeating the Arizona State Sun Devils on April 11, Nuveman Deniz walked 4 times for her single-game best. Later that month, Nuveman Deniz was named National Fastpitch Coaches Association "National Player of The Week" after hitting .833 and driving in 11 runs with 4 home runs.

On May 22, the sophomore's record season continued when the Bruin hit her 50th career home run off Michelle Harrison of the Minnesota Gophers, the first player to accomplish the milestone in just two seasons of play. At the WCWS, Nuveman Deniz would hit a walk off double against the DePaul Blue Demons to send No. 1 seeded UCLA into the finals vs. the Washington Huskies. Nuveman Deniz and team emerged national champions, defeating Jennifer Spediacci and Jamie Graves 3–2 on May 31.

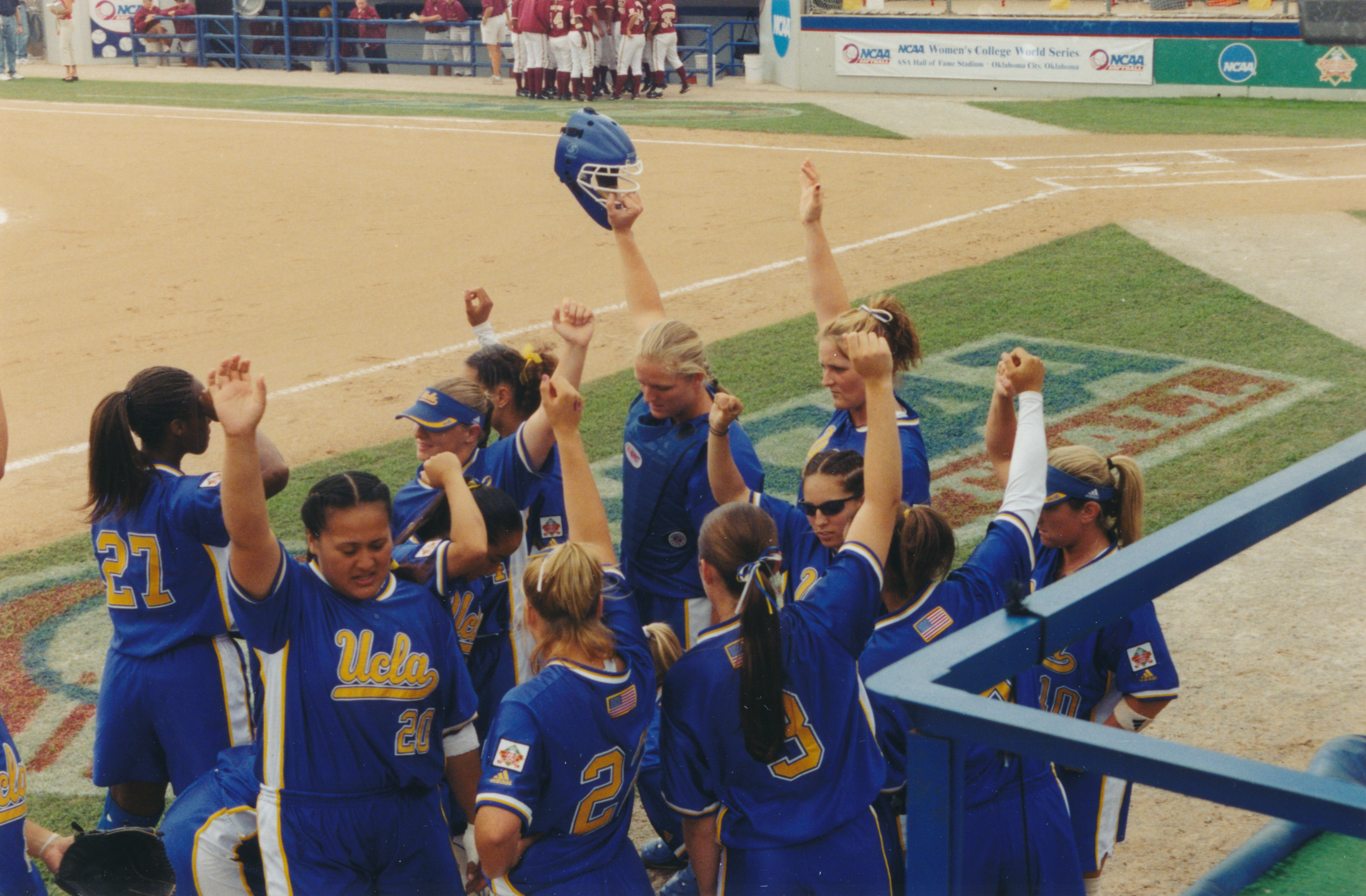
Deniz 0254

=== 2001 ===
Returning from a role with the 2000 Olympic team, Nuveman Deniz earned her third First Team All-American, First Team Pac-10 and second Pac-10 Player of the Year and Diamond Sports NFCA Catcher of the Year honors. She broke her own walks record with 69 and set the intentionals at 28, an NCAA record at the time. Her home runs and RBIs were second all-time at UCLA.

Nuveman Deniz made her third appearance in the WCWS championship on May 28 but eventually lost to Jennie Finch and the Arizona Wildcats.

=== 2002 ===
For a final time, Nuveman Deniz earned all-season honors and added a newly awarded USA Softball Collegiate Player of the Year to her collection. Nuveman would claim her third conference Player of The Year award to match fellow Bruin Lisa Fernandez and is the third overall to do it. Nuveman Deniz would solidify the UCLA Bruins season batting average and walks records at .529 and 77 respectively, leading the NCAA and ranking top-10 all-time for a season with the average. Her hits, RBIs and home run totals for the senior were all top-10 records at UCLA. She also owned then-school records for slugging and on-base percentage, both of which still rank second all-time. The slugging is also top-10 all-time for an NCAA season.

With a perfect day at the plate (3/3) in defeating the Long Beach State 49ers on February 23, Nuveman Deniz drove in her 200th career RBI. On April 29, Nuveman Deniz was named "Player of The Week" for a second time by the NFCA by hitting over .650 with 5 RBIs and three extra base hits for a slugging 1.018%. On May 4, the Bruin launched her 86th career home run vs. Kristen Hunter and the Oregon State Beavers. She topped former Arizona Wildcats Laura Espinoza and Leah Braatz for the crown. Two days later, she earned a third "Player of the Week," this selection improving her slugging to 1.571%. Though eliminated earlier than was usual, Nuveman Deniz was named a WCWS All-Tournament selectee for a second tournament.

Nuveman Deniz finished her college career in ownership of school records in batting average, RBIs, home runs, hits, doubles, walks (including intentional), slugging and on-base percentage. Only the hits and doubles have been surpassed. She also owns the now named Pac-12 career records in average, intentional walks and slugging. Lastly, her career batting average ranks tied sixth all-time (second for a four-year career), the total bases and intentional walks remain the NCAA standard, while too ranking top-5 in RBIs (5th), home runs and walks (3rd), slugging (2nd).

== Olympic career ==
Nuveman Deniz's Olympic debut came at the 2000 Summer Games in Sydney. After struggling at the plate, hitting a combined .171, Team USA faced the threat of elimination in a doubleheader on September 25. Nuveman Deniz hit a three-run homer in the bottom of the 10th inning to defeat China in a crucial game to get a shot at medaling. In the next game vs. Australia, she would be on base to score the winning run and be able to play for gold. The Americans eventually went on to claim gold vs. previously undefeated Japan on September 26; Nuveman Deniz mustered the only hit to bring the tying run across the plate. She then got on base in the extra 8th inning to score for a 2–1 win. Nuveman Deniz was tied leading the team in RBIs.

In preparation for the 2004 Summer Olympics in Athens, Nuveman Deniz played the later half of the tour and hit over .400. For the 2004 Games, Team USA dominated the competition to establish themselves as the best team in the world, eventually seizing the gold medal. Nuveman Deniz had two hits in the gold medal game, including a solo home run for a 5–1 victory on August 23. In round robin, she also helped defeat their eventual opponent Australia with a three-run homer on August 15. Overall Nuveman Deniz hit .312 with two home runs and 5 RBIs to contribute to Team USA's record-breaking tournament. The American pitching staff gave up just one run during the entire Olympic Games, a run of dominance partially attributed to Nuveman's game-calling ability. This team was referred to afterward as the "Real Dream Team" on the cover of Sports Illustrated, taking a swipe at the disappointing American men's basketball team at the same Games.

Nuveman Deniz hit .342 on the Bound For Beijing Tour in 2008 but suffered at the Olympics, hitting .182 overall. She was shut out in the gold medal game in which the Americans were defeated 3–1 by Japan and took silver.

== Coaching career ==
In 2007, Nuveman Deniz began working at College of the Sequoias as their assistant head coach. After the Olympics, she relocated her family to join the San Diego State Aztecs program, eventually moving to Assistant Head Coach's position in 2011. That same year, Nuveman Deniz was selected as an Assistant Coach for Team USA, which saw them take the World Cup and Pan American Games titles. In 2018, she took the Head coaching job for the Chicago Bandits of the National Pro Fastpitch league. In her first year, they set records and went to the play in the Cowles Cup championship game.

On May 27, 2020, Nuveman Deniz was named head coach in waiting for San Diego State. She was named head coach on June 8, 2021.

In November 2024, Athletes Unlimited hired Nuveman Deniz as the head coach for team Bandits in their inaugural season of the Athletes Unlimited Softball League (AUSL).

== Personal life ==
As strong as her bat is, many in softball believe Nuveman Deniz's strongest suit is her play behind the plate as the catcher. Nuveman Deniz calls as good a game as any, scouting the opposing team's batters and working with her pitchers, a list which list includes Lisa Fernandez, Michele Smith, Lori Harrigan, Christa Williams, Cat Osterman, Jennie Finch, Amanda Freed, Monica Abbott, Keira Goerl and Courtney Dale.

Nuveman Deniz is an aspiring broadcaster, doing telecasts for ESPN, FOX Sports, and CSTV. She has also worked broadcasts at her alma mater, UCLA and the Women's College World Series.

Nuveman Deniz also works with several organizations, including the Visalia Miracle League, the Women's Sports Foundation, and the Make-a-Wish Foundation. She also gives clinics to coaches and players across the country.

After marrying attorney Mark Deniz in 2003, in 2007 Nuveman Deniz gave birth to son Chase Deniz. She later gave birth to her second son Dylan Deniz.

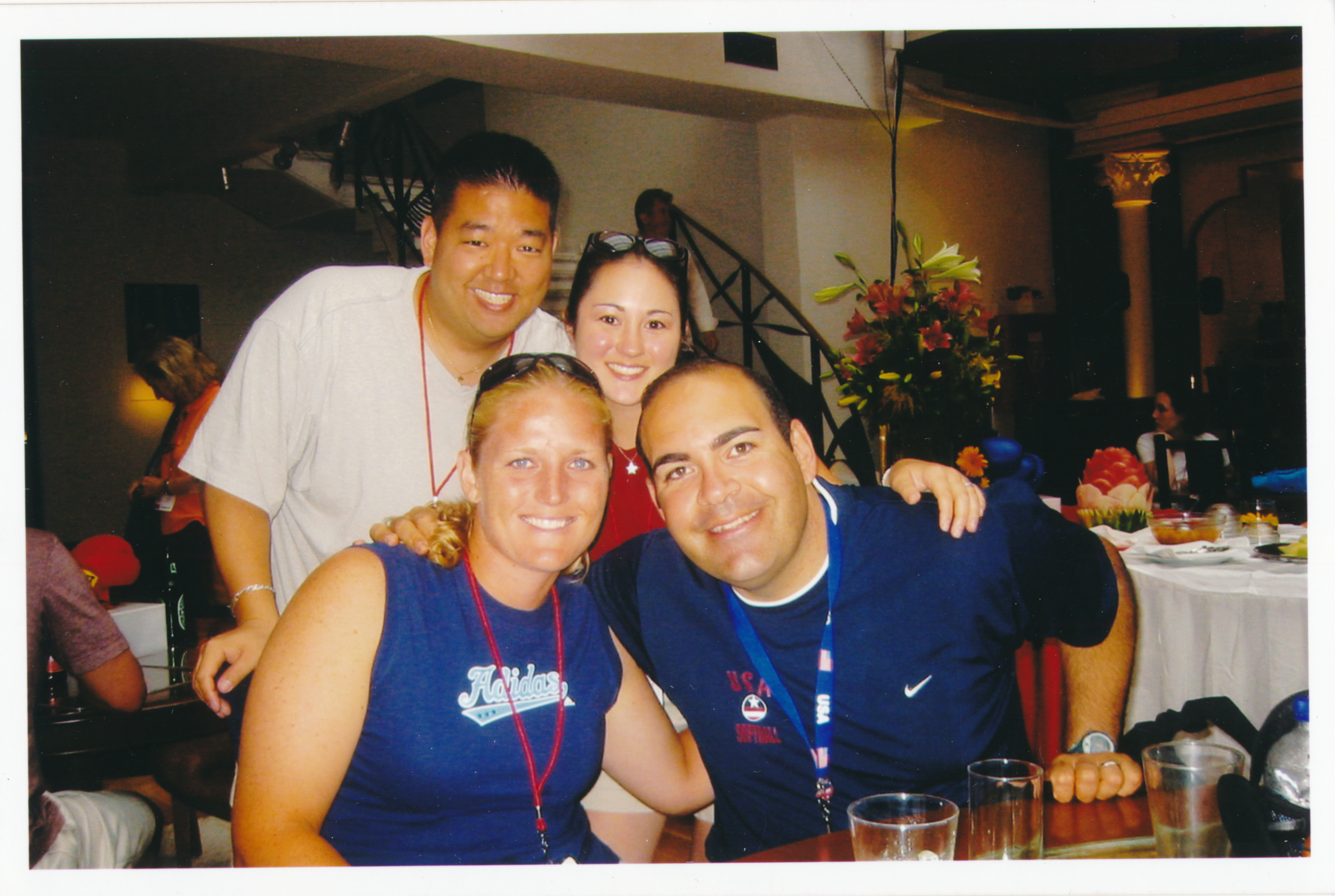
Deniz 0332

Nuveman Deniz played one professional season with the Arizona Heat. She had the third best average and was named to the NPF All-Stars. She would later go on to play on PFX Tour.

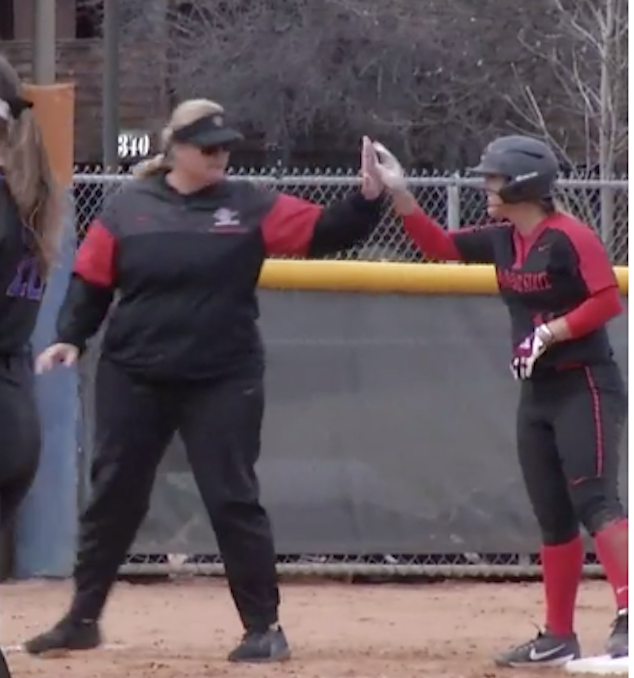
Stacey Nuveman Deniz at SDSU

Nuveman Deniz is not a regular speaker at coaches clinics across the country. She has declined offers at multiple Pac-12 schools to stay in San Diego and remain in southern California. Nuveman Deniz received her master's degree in Kinesiology in 2013. She has made videos, co-authored books, and has been a figure in softball for over 20 years.

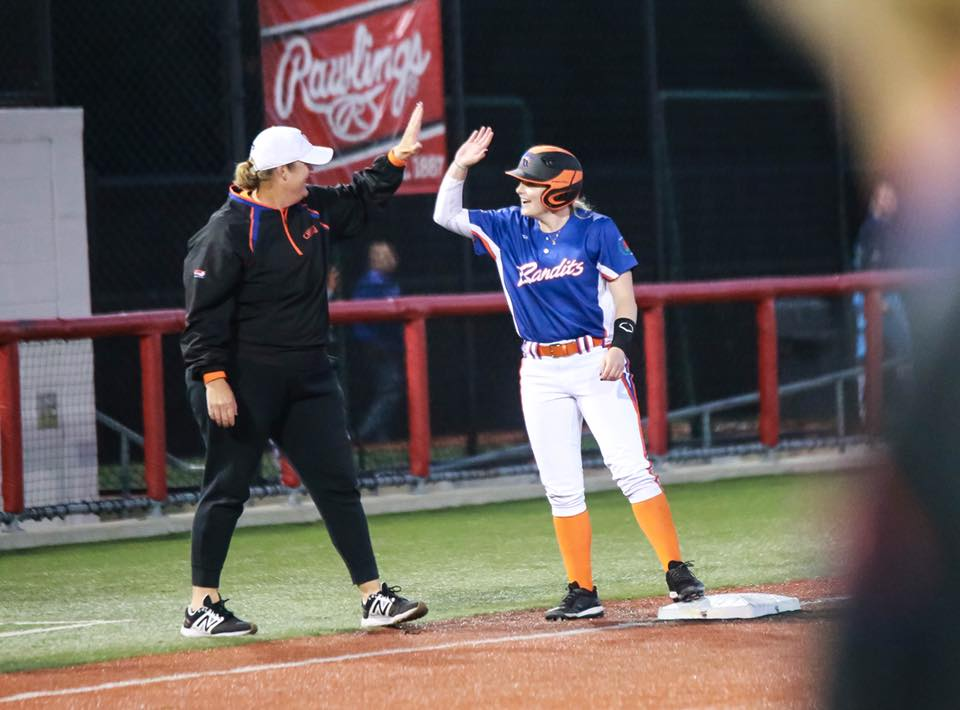
Chicago Bandits 2018 Stacey

== Athletic Accomplishments ==
- 4-time First Team All-American
- Three-time Pac-10 Player of The Year
- 2002 USA Softball Collegiate Player of the Year
- .466 batting average (6th all-time)
- 299 RBIs (5th all-time)
- 90 home runs (3rd all-time)
- .945% slugging percentage (2nd all-time)
- 240 walks (3rd all-time)
- 81 intentional walks (1st all-time)
- 653 total bases (1st all-time)
- Today's Top VIII Award (Class of 2003)

Nuveman was voted into the UCLA Athletics Hall of Fame in 2012.

== Statistics ==
UCLA Bruins
YEAR	G	AB	R	H	BA	RBI	HR	3B	2B	TB	SLG	BB	SO	SB	SBA
1997	63	184	40	84	.456	71	20	2	9	157	.853%	33	11	3	4
1999	69	184	49	82	.445	91	31	0	12	187	1.016%	61	13	0	0
2001	68	166	42	73	.440	73	19	0	15	145	.873%	77	19	1	2
2002	64	157	42	83	.528	64	20	3	15	164	1.044%	69	10	3	3
TOTALS	264	691	173	322	.466	299	90	5	51	653	.945%	240	53	7	9

Team USA
YEAR	AB	R	H	BA	RBI	HR	3B	2B	TB	SLG	BB	SO	SB	SBA
2000	28	1	5	.178	4	1	0	0	8	.285%	3	13	0	0
2004	86	16	34	.395	32	8	0	9	67	.779%	16	11	0	0
2008	136	19	43	.316	40	8	1	9	74	.544%	21	15	2	2
TOTALS	250	36	82	.328	76	17	1	18	149	.596%	40	39	2	2

Arizona Heat
YEAR	AB	R	H	BA	RBI	HR	3B	2B	TB	SLG	BB	SO	SB	SBA
2005	41	10	18	.439	17	3	0	1	28	.683%	12	2	0	0

== Head coaching record ==
=== College ===
Record table
Season	Team	Overall	Conference	Standing	Postseason
San Diego State Aztecs (Mountain West Conference) (2022–present)
2022	San Diego State	39–16	20–4	1st	NCAA Regionals
2023	San Diego State	39–17	16–6	2nd	NCAA Super Regionals
2024	San Diego State	31–20	15–7	1st	NCAA Regionals
2025	San Diego State	8–2	0–0		
San Diego State:		117–55 (.680)	51–17 (.750)		
Total:		109–53 (.673)			
National champion Postseason invitational champion Conference regular season champion Conference regular season and conference tournament champion Division regular season champion Division regular season and conference tournament champion Conference tournament champion

== Trivia ==
- Nuveman Deniz's motto is "Dream Big."
- Nuveman Deniz wears the number 33.

== See also ==
- NCAA Division I softball career .400 batting average list
- NCAA Division I softball career 200 RBIs list
- NCAA Division I softball career 50 home runs list
