= Lisa Fernandez =

American Olympic gold medalist in softball

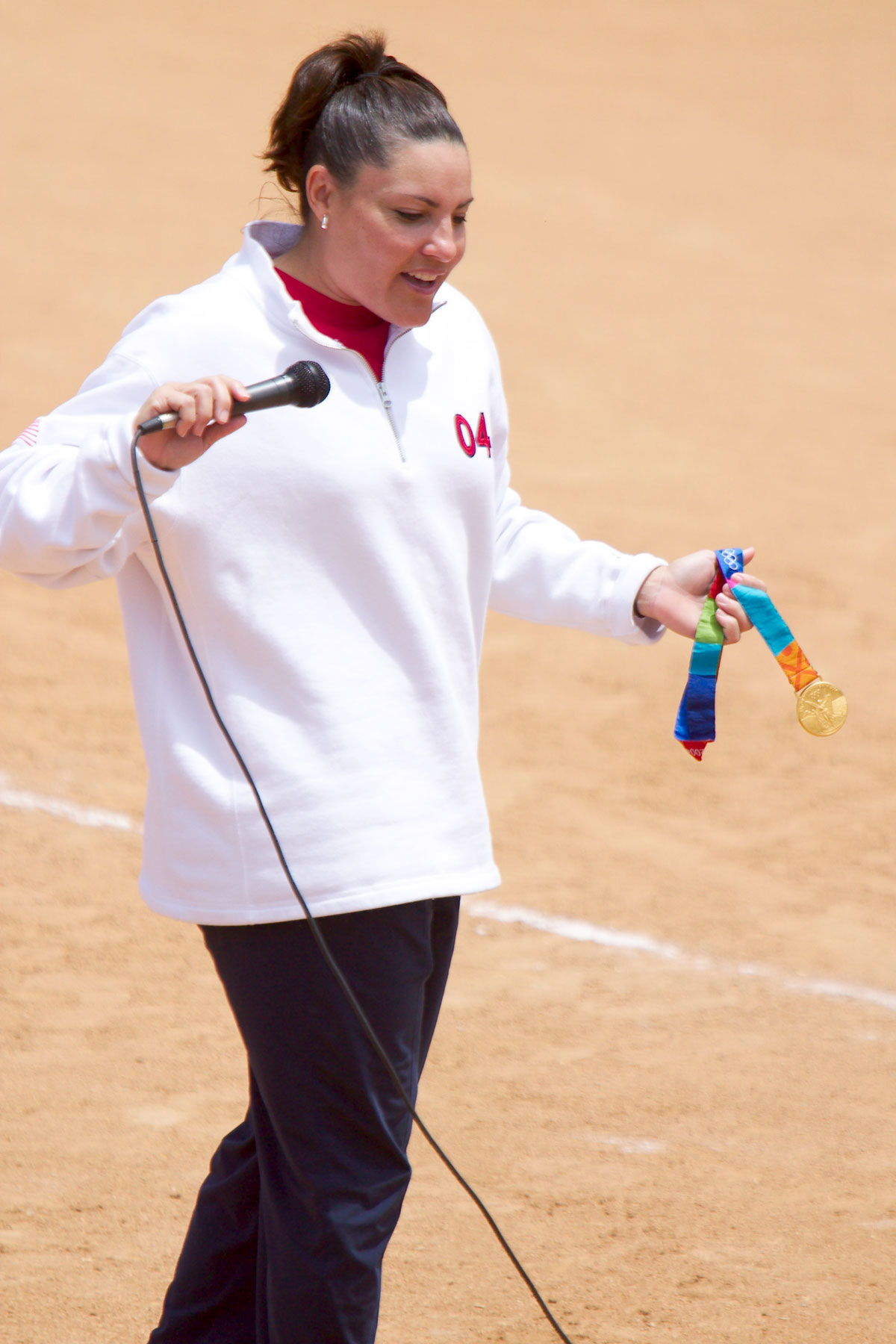
- Fernandez in 2006

Personal information
- Full name: Lisa Maria Fernandez
- Born: February 22, 1971 (age 55) Long Beach, California, U.S.
- Education: UCLA ('95)
- Height: 5 ft 6 in (168 cm)
Medal record
Women's softball
Representing the United States
Olympic Games
Gold medal – first place	1996 Atlanta	Team competition
Gold medal – first place	2000 Sydney	Team competition
Gold medal – first place	2004 Athens	Team competition
Silver medal – second place	2008 Beijing	Team competition (alternate)

Lisa Maria Fernandez (born February 22, 1971) is an American former softball player and current associate head coach at UCLA. She is also the general manager of the Utah Talons for the inaugural 2025 season of the Athletes Unlimited Softball League (AUSL). She played college softball at UCLA as a pitcher and third baseman, and is a three-time medal winning Olympian with Team USA.

Fernandez starred on both sides of the plate for the UCLA Bruins from 1990 to 1993, and was two-time national champion and four-time first team All-American. She continues to hold the UCLA records for career shutouts, WHIP and winning percentage. She also established an Olympic record in softball with 25 strikeouts in a game as a member of the United States women's national softball team. Additionally, she is noted for having pitched in three consecutive gold medal games, getting a save in 1996, an extra-inning shutout in 2000 before concluding the run by cinching the 2004 medal in a 5–1 victory. Fernandez was named the #1 Greatest College Softball Player and is a USA Softball Hall of Fame honoree.

== Early years ==
Fernandez was born and raised in Long Beach, California. Her father emigrated from Cuba, where he played baseball, and her mother was of Puerto Rican descent. Fernandez's mother played, with her brother (Lisa's uncle) stickball, a street game similar to baseball played with a broom stick and a rubber ball. Fernandez began playing softball at the age of eight. When she was twelve, she played in a local children's league. She tried out as a pitcher, however, her coach told her that she would never make it because she didn't have the right size and build. At St. Joseph High School, Fernandez joined her school's girls' softball team and together with her teammates won the CIF Championship.

== College career ==
Upon graduating from high school, she was accepted to UCLA, where she played softball and earned a degree in psychology. Fernandez played at UCLA from 1990 to 1993. She was a three-time winner of the Pac-12 Player of the Year award, and four-time winner of the Honda Sports Award for softball, and became the first softball player to win the Honda-Broderick Cup in 1993, given to the outstanding collegiate female athlete in all sports. A four-time, first-team All-American, Fernandez led UCLA to two national championships (1990 & 1992) and two runner-up finishes (1991 & 1993).

== U.S. Women's Olympic Softball Team ==
In 1990, Fernandez won a gold medal at the ISF (International Softball Federation) World Championship. Among her accomplishments are:

- 1991, gold medal at the Pan American Games
- 1994, gold medals at ISF World Championships and Pan Am Qualifier
- 1991 and 1992, Sportswoman of the Year Award
- Led UCLA to two NCAA Women's College World Series Titles
- Four-time NFCA First Team All-American
- NCAA Top VI Award presented to the top six senior student athletes in all divisions
- 1993, Honda-Broderick Cup winner, country's most outstanding collegiate female athlete
- 1991-93, Four-time Honda Sports Award winner for softball presented to the nation's best softball player
- 1996, Olympic gold medal in the 1996 Olympics celebrated in Atlanta, Georgia
- 1998, gold medal at Pan American Games;
- 2000, Olympic gold medal in the 2000 Sydney Olympics celebrated in Australia where she established a 25 strikeout record in women's softball
- 2002, gold medal at the ISF World Championships
- 2003, gold medal at the Pan American Games
- 2004, Olympic gold medal in the 2004 Athens Olympics celebrated in Greece.

== Honors ==
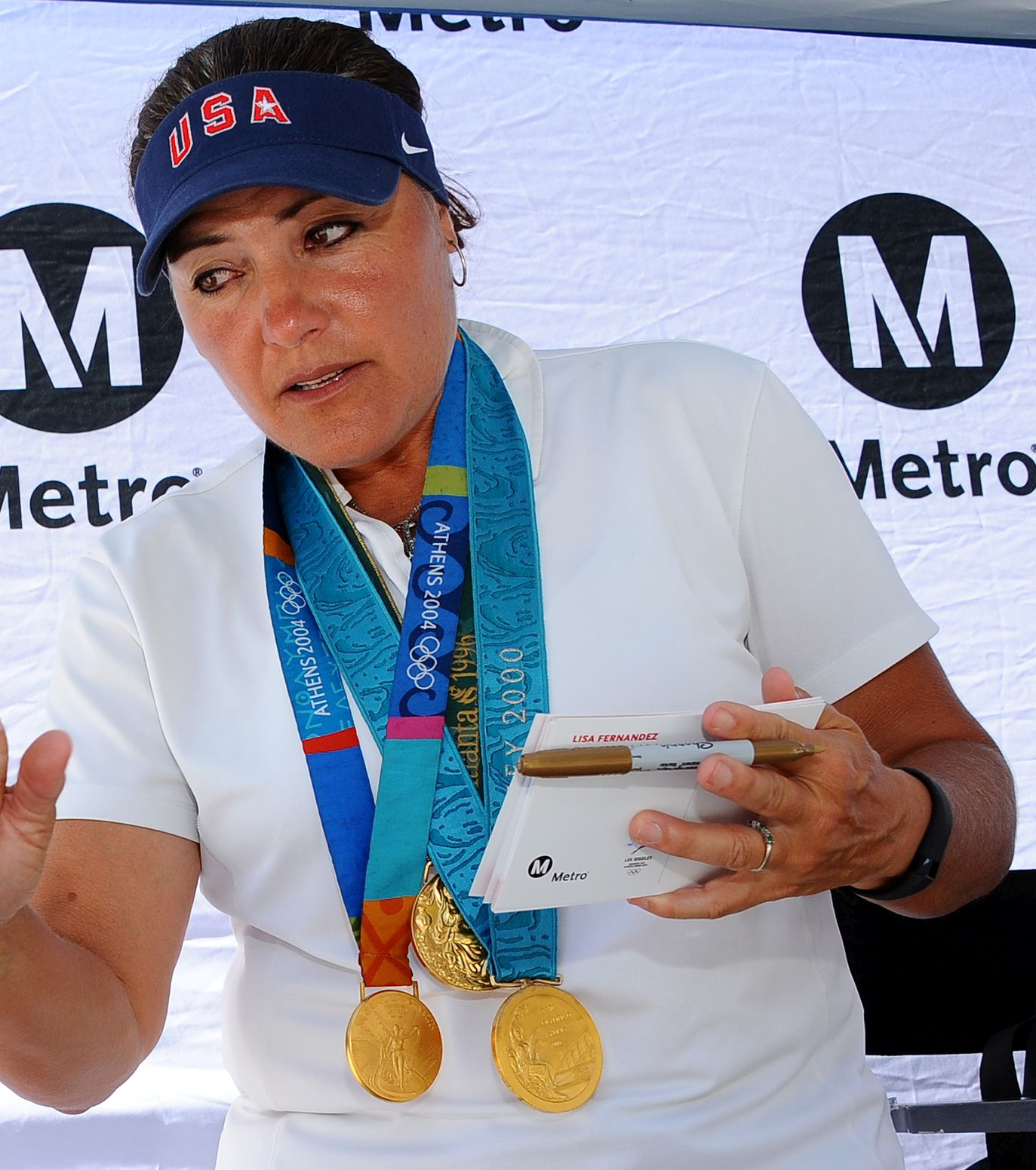
Lisa Fernandez in 2016

On April 24, 2001, the Lakewood City Council recognized Fernandez as one of the most remarkable athletes ever to come from the playgrounds and ball diamonds of Lakewood. The city council named the ball field at Mayfair Park in her honor, as the Lakewood Sports Hall of Fame Athlete of the Year.

Fernandez was inducted into the Baseball Reliquary's Shrine of the Eternals in 2019.

== Later years ==
She married Michael Lujan in 2002 and gave birth to their sons Antonio in 2005, and Cruz in 2008. Fernandez and her family reside in Long Beach, California. Fernandez is currently an assistant coach for the women's softball team at UCLA. In 2017, she was suspended two games for bumping an umpire after being ejected from a Bruins' Women's College World Series game. On August 10, 2022, Fernandez was promoted to associate head coach for the Bruins.

In November 2024, Athletes Unlimited hired Fernandez as the general manager for team Talons in their inaugural season of the Athletes Unlimited Softball League (AUSL).

== Statistics ==
UCLA Bruins
YEAR	W	L	GP	GS	CG	SHO	SV	IP	H	R	ER	BB	SO	ERA	WHIP
1990	11	1	15	12	12	8	0	83.0	33	6	3	10	51	0.25	0.52
1991	20	3	26	24	23	16	1	165.2	68	9	6	22	165	0.25	0.54
1992	29	0	30	27	27	22	0	196.1	77	7	4	25	220	0.14	0.52
1993	33	3	36	33	33	28	0	249.2	80	10	9	46	348	0.25	0.50
TOTALS	93	7	107	96	95	74	1	694.2	258	32	22	103	784	0.22	0.52

YEAR	G	AB	R	H	BA	RBI	HR	3B	2B	TB	SLG	BB	SO	SB	SBA
1990	67	213	27	66	.310	22	1	2	7	80	.375%	12	6	1	1
1991	63	205	25	70	.341	32	2	1	9	87	.424%	17	2	0	0
1992	56	177	47	71	.401	29	1	4	10	92	.520%	21	5	2	2
1993	54	157	43	80	.509	45	11	2	12	129	.821%	35	3	0	0
TOTALS	240	752	142	287	.381	128	15	9	38	388	.516%	85	16	3	3

Team USA
YEAR	W	L	GP	GS	CG	SHO	SV	IP	H	R	ER	BB	SO	ERA	WHIP
1996	1	0	3	2	1	1	1	21.0	4	2	1	0	31	0.33	0.19
2000	2	1	4	4	2	1	0	29.2	7	3	2	4	52	0.48	0.37
2004	4	0	4	4	4	3	0	24.0	9	1	1	3	10	0.29	0.50
TOTALS	7	1	11	10	7	5	1	74.2	20	6	4	7	93	0.37	0.36

YEAR	G	AB	R	H	BA	RBI	HR	3B	2B	TB	SLG	BB	SO	SB	SBA
1996	9	23	5	8	.348	5	1	0	0	11	.478%	5	2	1	1
2000	9	31	2	3	.097	2	1	0	0	6	.193%	3	4	0	0
2004	9	22	3	12	.545	8	1	0	3	18	.818%	4	0	0	0
TOTALS	27	76	10	23	.302	15	3	0	3	35	.460%	12	6	1	1

== See also ==
- List of people of Puerto Rican descent in Sports
- Sports in Puerto Rico
- Lakewood, California
- List of people from Long Beach, California
