= San Diego State Aztecs softball =

College softball team

- Founded: 1977
- University: San Diego State University
- Head coach: Stacey Nuveman-Deniz (5th season)
- Conference: Pac-12
- Location: San Diego, California
- Home stadium: SDSU Softball Stadium (capacity: 1,000)
- Nickname: Aztecs
- Colors: Scarlet and black

NCAA super regional appearances
- 2023

NCAA Tournament appearances
- 2001, 2003, 2006, 2008, 2009, 2010, 2011, 2012, 2013, 2014, 2015, 2022, 2023, 2024, 2025

Conference tournament championships
- 2023, 2024, 2025

Regular-season conference championships
- 2002, 2003, 2006, 2008, 2012, 2013, 2014, 2022, 2024

The San Diego State Aztecs softball is the team is the softball program that represents San Diego State University (SDSU). The Aztecs compete in NCAA Division I as a member of the Pac-12 Conference. The team plays their home games at the SDSU Softball Stadium.

== Postseason results ==
=== Regular season conference championships ===
Mountain West Conference (9)

- 2002, 2003, 2006, 2008, 2012, 2013, 2014, 2022, 2024

=== Conference tournament championships ===
Mountain West Conference tournament (3)

- 2022, 2024, 2025

== NCAA tournament results ==
| Year | Tournament Record | Notes |
|---|---|---|
| 2001 | 3–2 | Lost in the Region 2 Regional finals to UCLA. |
| 2003 | 1–2 | Eliminated by Oregon in the Region 6 Regional. |
| 2006 | 2–2 | Lost in the Los Angeles Regional finals to UCLA. |
| 2008 | 1–2 | Eliminated by Fresno State in the Gainesville Regional. |
| 2009 | 0–2 | Eliminated by Cal State Fullerton in the Tempe Regional. |
| 2010 | 1–2 | Eliminated by Fresno State in the Los Angeles Regional. |
| 2011 | 2–2 | Eliminated by Arizona State in the Tempe Regional finals. |
| 2012 | 2–2 | Eliminated by Hofstra in the Tampa Regional finals. |
| 2013 | 1–2 | Eliminated by Georgia in the Tempe Regional. |
| 2014 | 1–2 | Eliminated by Michigan in the Tallahassee Regional. |
| 2015 | 2–2 | Eliminated by UCLA in the Los Angeles Regional finals. |
| 2022 | 2–2 | Eliminated by Arizona State in the Tempe Regional finals. |
| 2023 | 4-2 | Eliminated by Utah in the Salt Lake City Super Regional. |
| 2024 | 0–2 | Eliminated by Grand Canyon in the Los Angeles Regional. |

== Head coaches ==
| Head Coach | Seasons | Overall | Pct. |
|---|---|---|---|
| Rebecca Quinn | 1977–1978 | 17–29 | .370 |
| Liane Lane | 1979–1983 | 82–99–1 | .453 |
| Linda Spradley | 1984–1994 | 253–372–4 | .405 |
| Linda Spradley and Kathy Van Wyk | 1995–1996 | 48–69 | .410 |
| Kathy Van Wyk | 1997–2021 | 806–557–1 | .591 |
| Stacey Nuveman-Deniz | 2022–present | 109–53 | .673 |
