= USA Softball Collegiate Player of the Year =

Sports award

- Awarded for: Best player in college softball
- Country: United States
- Presented by: USA Softball

History
- First award: 2002
- Most recent: Jordy Frahm, Nebraska

The USA Softball Collegiate Player of the Year is an award given by USA Softball to the best college softball player of the year. The award has been given annually since 2002. The award is voted on by coaching representatives of 10 Division I conferences in the 10 USA Softball regions, members of the media who consistently cover Division I softball across the country, as well as past winners of the award.

== Winners ==
Winners
Year	Player	Position	School	Ref
2002	Stacey Nuveman-Deniz	C	UCLA	
2003	Cat Osterman	P	Texas	
2004	Jessica van der Linden	P	Florida State	
2005	Cat Osterman (2)	P	Texas	
2006	Cat Osterman (3)	P	Texas	
2007	Monica Abbott	P	Tennessee	
2008	Angela Tincher	P	Virginia Tech	
2009	Danielle Lawrie	P	Washington	
2010	Danielle Lawrie (2)	P	Washington	
2011	Ashley Hansen	SS	Stanford	
2012	Keilani Ricketts	P	Oklahoma	
2013	Keilani Ricketts (2)	P	Oklahoma	
2014	Lacey Waldrop	P	Florida State	
2015	Lauren Haeger	P	Florida	
2016	Sierra Romero	2B	Michigan	
2017	Kelly Barnhill	P	Florida	
2018	Rachel Garcia	P	UCLA	
2019	Rachel Garcia (2)	P	UCLA	
2021	Jocelyn Alo	U	Oklahoma	
2022	Jocelyn Alo (2)	U	Oklahoma	
2023	Valerie Cagle	U/P	Clemson	
2024	NiJaree Canady	P	Stanford	
2025	Bri Ellis	1B	Arkansas	
2026	Jordy Frahm	P	Nebraska	
