= List of Florida State Seminoles softball seasons =

The following is a list of Florida State Seminoles softball seasons. The Florida State Seminoles are a member of the Atlantic Coast Conference of the NCAA Division I.

The Seminoles have won 20 conference championships, appeared in the NCAA Division I softball tournament 38 times, and in the Women's College World Series 12 times. The Seminoles won the National Championship in 2018 and were runner-up in 2021 and 2023. The Seminoles also won AIAW championships in 1981 and 1982 and were ASA runner-up in 1983.

== Season results ==
National champions	Women's College World Series berth	NCAA Tournament berth	Conference Tournament Champions	Conference Regular Season Champions

Season	Head coach	Conference	Season results									Tournament results	
Season	Head coach	Conference	Overall				Conference					Conference	Postseason
Season	Head coach	Conference	Wins	Losses	Ties	%	Wins	Losses	Ties	%	Finish	Conference	Postseason
1978	JoAnne Graf	Independent	46	9	0	.836	N/A						—
1979	JoAnne Graf	Independent	26	15	0	.634	N/A						—
1980	JoAnne Graf	Independent	37	10	0	.787	N/A						—
1981	JoAnne Graf	Independent	54	7	0	.885	N/A						National Champions
1982	JoAnne Graf	Independent	56	10	0	.848	N/A						National Champions
1983	JoAnne Graf	Independent	46	11	0	.807	N/A						ASA Runner-up
1984	JoAnne Graf	Independent	41	5	2	.875	N/A						—
1985	JoAnne Graf	Independent	50	12	2	.797	N/A						—
1986	JoAnne Graf	Independent	42	7	0	.857	N/A						NCAA Regional
1987	JoAnne Graf	Independent	50	14	0	.781	N/A						Women's College World Series
1988	JoAnne Graf	Independent	44	14	0	.759	N/A						NCAA Regional
1989	JoAnne Graf	Independent	39	14	0	.736	N/A						NCAA Regional
1990	JoAnne Graf	Independent	47	16	0	.746	N/A						Women's College World Series
1991	JoAnne Graf	Independent	62	12	0	.838	N/A						Women's College World Series
1992	JoAnne Graf	ACC	63	9	0	.875	4	2	0	.667	1st	Champions	Women's College World Series
1993	JoAnne Graf	ACC	52	9	0	.852	4	0	0	1.000	1st	Champions	Women's College World Series
1994	JoAnne Graf	ACC	50	19	0	.725	9	2	0	.818	1st	Runner-up	NCAA Regional
1995	JoAnne Graf	ACC	58	15	0	.795	6	0	0	1.000	1st	Champions	NCAA Regional
1996	JoAnne Graf	ACC	51	21	0	.708	5	3	0	.625	2nd	Champions	NCAA Regional
1997	JoAnne Graf	ACC	45	19	0	.703	7	1	0	.875	1st	Co-champions	—
1998	JoAnne Graf	ACC	51	21	0	.708	5	3	0	.625	2nd	Champions	NCAA Regional
1999	JoAnne Graf	ACC	40	25	1	.614	6	2	0	.750	2nd	Champions	—
2000	JoAnne Graf	ACC	51	27	0	.654	6	2	0	.750	3rd	Champions	NCAA Regional
2001	JoAnne Graf	ACC	58	12	0	.829	7	1	0	.875	1st	Runner-up	NCAA Regional
2002	JoAnne Graf	ACC	55	20	0	.733	6	0	0	1.000	1st	3rd	Women's College World Series
2003	JoAnne Graf	ACC	46	11	0	.807	8	0	0	1.000	1st	Champions	NCAA Regional
2004	JoAnne Graf	ACC	62	12	0	.838	9	1	0	.900	1st	Champions	Women's College World Series
2005	JoAnne Graf	ACC	35	28	0	.556	11	6	0	.647	2nd	T-5th	NCAA Regional
2006	JoAnne Graf	ACC	44	30	0	.595	10	10	0	.500	5th	Runner-up	NCAA Super Regional
2007	JoAnne Graf	ACC	44	25	0	.638	13	7	0	.650	4th	4th	NCAA Regional
2008	JoAnne Graf	ACC	38	28	0	.576	12	9	0	.571	3rd	4th	NCAA Regional
2009	Lonni Alameda	ACC	44	16	0	.733	17	4	0	.810	2nd	Runner-up	NCAA Regional
2010	Lonni Alameda	ACC	44	18	0	.710	12	9	0	.571	3rd	3rd	NCAA Regional
2011	Lonni Alameda	ACC	32	28	0	.533	9	11	0	.450	4th	Champions	NCAA Regional
2012	Lonni Alameda	ACC	47	16	0	.746	16	5	0	.762	2nd	4th	NCAA Regional
2013	Lonni Alameda	ACC	44	19	0	.698	18	2	0	.900	1st	Runner-up	NCAA Super Regional
2014	Lonni Alameda	ACC	55	9	0	.859	24	3	0	.889	1st	Champions	Women's College World Series
2015	Lonni Alameda	ACC	49	14	0	.778	20	3	0	.870	1st	Champions	NCAA Super Regional
2016	Lonni Alameda	ACC	55	10	0	.846	21	2	0	.913	1st	Champions	Women's College World Series
2017	Lonni Alameda	ACC	55	8	1	.867	24	0	0	1.000	1st	Champions	NCAA Super Regional
2018	Lonni Alameda	ACC	58	12	0	.829	21	3	0	.875	1st	Champions	National Champions
2019	Lonni Alameda	ACC	55	10	0	.846	19	5	0	.792	2nd	Champions	NCAA Super Regional
2020	Lonni Alameda	ACC	17	7	0	.708	Season canceled due to COVID-19 pandemic						
2021	Lonni Alameda	ACC	49	13	1	.786	26	5	1	.828	2nd	3rd	Women's College World Series Runner-up
2022	Lonni Alameda	ACC	54	7	0	.885	19	5	0	.792	3rd	Champions	NCAA Regional
2023	Lonni Alameda	ACC	58	11	0	.841	22	2	0	.917	1st	Champions	Women's College World Series Runner-up
2024	Lonni Alameda	ACC	46	16	0	.742	19	5	0	.792	2nd	Runner-up	NCAA Super Regional
2025	Lonni Alameda	ACC	49	12	0	.803	18	3	0	.857	1st	Runner-up	NCAA Super Regional
2026	Lonni Alameda	ACC	52	10	0	.839	21	3	0	.875	1st	Champions	NCAA Regional
