= Atlantic Coast Conference softball tournament =

- Conference softball championship
- Sport: Softball
- Conference: ACC
- Number of teams: 12
- Format: Single-elimination tournament
- Current stadium: Palmer Park
- Current location: Charlottesville, VA
- Played: 1992–present
- Last contest: 2026
- Current champion: Florida State
- Most championships: Florida State (20)
- TV partner(s): ACC Network, ESPN
- Official website: https://theacc.com/feature/softball-championship

Host stadiums
- Shirley Clements Mewborn Field (2011, 2018); Williams Field at Eugene A. Anderson Stadium (2006, 2012, 2017); Dail Softball Stadium (2009, 2016); Tech Softball Park (2010, 2015); Robert E. Taylor Stadium (2005, 2008, 2014); JoAnne Graf Field at the Seminole Softball Complex (1999–2000, 2002–2004, 2007, 2013, 2019); Ulmer Stadium (2021); Vartabedian Field (2022); Melissa Cook Stadium (2023); Duke Softball Stadium (2024); Boston College Softball Field (2025); Palmer Park (2026)

Host locations
- Atlanta, GA (2011, 2018); Chapel Hill, NC (2006, 2012, 2017); Raleigh, NC (1996, 2001, 2009, 2016); Blacksburg, VA (2010, 2015); College Park, MD (2005, 2008, 2014); Tallahassee, FL (1992–1995, 1998–2000, 2002–2004, 2007, 2013, 2019); Marietta, GA (1997); Louisville, KY (2021); Pittsburgh, PA (2022); Notre Dame, IN (2023); Durham, NC (2024); Chestnut Hill, MA (2025); Charlottesville, VA (2026)

The Atlantic Coast Conference softball tournament is the conference championship tournament in college softball for the Atlantic Coast Conference. It is a single-elimination tournament, with seeding based on regular season records. The winner receives the conference's automatic bid to the NCAA Division I Softball Championship each season.

== Tournament ==
The ACC softball tournament is a single-elimination tournament held each year at various ACC campus stadiums. Thirteen of the fifteen current all-sport members of the conference sponsor softball. Miami (FL) and Wake Forest do not sponsor softball teams. Duke softball began competing in the 2018 season. Clemson is replacing Women's Diving with Softball beginning the 2020 season. The 2018 tournament features a first round in addition to quarterfinals, semifinals, and championship. It is assumed that all 12 teams make the tournament, but no online source has been found specifying how many teams are in the first round.

== Champions ==
=== Year-by-year ===
Year	Champion	Site	MVP
1992	Florida State	Tallahassee, FL	Susan Buttery, Florida State
1993	Florida State	Tallahassee, FL	Lisa Davidson, Florida State
1994	Virginia	Tallahassee, FL	Michelle Collins, Virginia
1995	Florida State	Tallahassee, FL	Cindy Lawson, Florida State
1996	Florida State	Raleigh, NC	Renee Espinoza, Florida State
1997	Florida State; Maryland (Note: Play was suspended due to weather during the championship game. Florida State and Maryland were named co-champions.)	Marietta, GA	Kristy Fuentes, Florida State; Kelly Shipman, Maryland
1998	Florida State	Tallahassee, FL	Stacy Venable, Florida State
1999	Florida State	Seminole Softball Complex • Tallahassee, FL	Danielle Cox, Florida State
2000	Florida State	Seminole Softball Complex • Tallahassee, FL	Leslie Malerich, Florida State
2001	North Carolina	Raleigh, NC	Radara McHugh, North Carolina
2002	Georgia Tech	Seminole Softball Complex • Tallahassee, FL	Jessica Sallinger, Georgia Tech
2003	Florida State	Seminole Softball Complex • Tallahassee, FL	Lesley Palmer, Florida State
2004	Florida State	Seminole Softball Complex • Tallahassee, FL	Casey Hunter, Florida State
2005	Georgia Tech	Robert E. Taylor Stadium • College Park, MD	Jessica Sallinger, Georgia Tech
2006	NC State	Williams Field at Eugene A. Anderson Stadium • Chapel Hill, NC	Shaine Ervin, NC State
2007	Virginia Tech	JoAnne Graf Field at the Seminole Softball Complex • Tallahassee, FL	Angela Tincher, Virginia Tech
2008	Virginia Tech	Robert E. Taylor Stadium • College Park, MD	Angela Tincher, Virginia Tech
2009	Georgia Tech	Dail Softball Stadium • Raleigh, NC	Kristen Adkins, Georgia Tech
2010	Georgia Tech	Tech Softball Park • Blacksburg, VA	Hope Rush, Georgia Tech
2011	Florida State	Shirley Clements Mewborn Field • Atlanta, GA	Sarah Hamilton, Florida State
2012	Georgia Tech	Williams Field at Eugene A. Anderson Stadium • Chapel Hill, NC	Hope Rush, Georgia Tech
2013	NC State	JoAnne Graf Field at the Seminole Softball Complex • Tallahassee, FL	Emily Weiman, NC State
2014	Florida State	Robert E. Taylor Stadium • College Park, MD	Celeste Gomez, Florida State
2015	Florida State	Tech Softball Park • Blacksburg, VA	Jessica Burroughs, Florida State
2016	Florida State	Dail Softball Stadium • Raleigh, NC	Jessica Warren, Florida State
2017	Florida State	Williams Field at Eugene A. Anderson Stadium • Chapel Hill, NC	Dani Morgan, Florida State
2018	Florida State	Shirley Clements Mewborn Field • Atlanta, GA	Sydney Sherrill, Florida State
2019	Florida State	JoAnne Graf Field at the Seminole Softball Complex • Tallahassee, FL	Meghan King, Florida State
2020	Cancelled due to the COVID-19 pandemic		
2021	Duke	Ulmer Stadium • Louisville, KY	Peyton St. George, Duke
2022	Florida State	Vartabedian Field • Pittsburgh, PA	Kalei Harding, Florida State
2023	Florida State	Melissa Cook Stadium • Notre Dame, IN	Kathryn Sandercock, Florida State
2024	Duke	Duke Softball Stadium • Durham, NC	Jala Wright, Duke
2025	Clemson	Boston College Softball Field • Chestnut Hill, MA	Taylor Pipkins, Clemson
2026	Florida State	Palmer Park • Charlottesville, VA	Jazzy Francik, Florida State

=== By school ===
School	Championships	Years
Florida State	20	1992, 1993, 1995, 1996, 1997, 1998, 1999, 2000, 2003, 2004, 2011, 2014, 2015, 2016, 2017, 2018, 2019, 2022, 2023, 2026
Georgia Tech	5	2002, 2005, 2009, 2010, 2012
Duke	2	2021, 2024
NC State	2	2006, 2013
Virginia Tech	2	2007, 2008
Clemson	1	2025
Maryland	1	1997
North Carolina	1	2001
Virginia	1	1994

Italics indicate school no longer sponsors softball in the ACC.
