= 2017 Atlantic Coast Conference softball tournament =

- Teams: 8
- Format: Single-elimination tournament
- Finals site: Anderson Stadium; Chapel Hill, North Carolina
- Champions: Florida State (15th title)
- Runner-up: North Carolina (5th title game)
- Winning coach: Lonni Alameda (5th title)
- MVP: Dani Morgan (Florida State)
- Television: RSN; ESPN

2017 Atlantic Coast Conference softball standings
	Conf.						Overall
Team	W		L		T	PCT	W		L		T	PCT
No. 10 Florida State ‍†‍‡‍^{y}	24	–	0	–	0	1.000	55	–	8	–	1	.867
Louisville ‍‍‍	14	–	8	–	0	.636	31	–	19	–	0	.620
North Carolina ‍‍‍^{y}	14	–	9	–	0	.609	40	–	21	–	0	.656
Boston College ‍‍‍	14	–	9	–	0	.609	31	–	22	–	0	.585
Notre Dame ‍‍‍^{y}	13	–	11	–	0	.542	34	–	23	–	0	.596
Syracuse ‍‍‍	10	–	10	–	0	.500	31	–	19	–	0	.620
NC State ‍‍‍	10	–	14	–	0	.417	18	–	38	–	0	.321
Virginia ‍‍‍	9	–	15	–	0	.375	22	–	32	–	0	.407
Georgia Tech ‍‍‍	8	–	16	–	0	.333	19	–	34	–	0	.358
Pittsburgh ‍‍‍	7	–	17	–	0	.292	24	–	23	–	0	.511
Virginia Tech ‍‍‍	5	–	19	–	0	.208	19	–	34	–	0	.358
† – Conference champion ‡ – Tournament champion y – Invited to the NCAA tournament Rankings from NFCA

The 2017 Atlantic Coast Conference (ACC) Softball tournament was held at Anderson Stadium on the campus of the University of North Carolina in Chapel Hill, North Carolina from May 11 through May 13, 2017.

The quarterfinals and semifinals were shown on the ACC RSN's with a simulcast on ESPN3. The championship game was broadcast by ESPN.

== Tournament ==
Quarterfinals
1	Florida State	16
8	Virginia	0
4	Boston College	5
5	Notre Dame	9
2	Louisville	2
7	NC State	5
3	North Carolina	8
6	Syracuse	4

Semifinals
1	Florida State	6
5	Notre Dame	0
7	NC State	7
3	North Carolina	8

Finals
1	Florida State	4
3	North Carolina	3

== All Tournament Team ==
Player	Team
Jessica Burroughs	Florida State
Carsyn Gordon	Florida State
Meghan King	Florida State
**Dani Morgan**	Florida State
Anna Shelnutt	Florida State
Kendra Lynch	North Carolina
Leah Murray	North Carolina
Brittany Pickett	North Carolina
Caitlyn Brooks	Notre Dame
Jessica Moore	NC State
Peyton Silverman	NC State

MVP in bold
