= 2026 Atlantic Coast Conference softball tournament =

- Teams: 12
- Format: Single-elimination tournament
- Finals site: Palmer Park; Charlottesville, Virginia
- Champions: Florida State (20 title)
- Runner-up: Virginia Tech (3 title game)
- Winning coach: Lonni Alameda (10 title)
- MVP: Jazzy Francik (Florida State)
- Attendance: 12,179
- Television: ACCN; ESPN

2026 Atlantic Coast Conference softball standings
	Conf.				Overall
Team	W		L	PCT	W		L	PCT
No. 7 Florida State ‍†‍‡‍^{y}	21	–	3	.875	58	–	11	.841
No. 13 Duke ‍‍‍^{y}	20	–	4	.833	44	–	17	.721
No. 11 Virginia Tech ‍‍‍^{y}	18	–	6	.750	48	–	12	.800
No. 25 Louisville ‍‍‍^{y}	18	–	6	.750	45	–	14	.763
No. 14 Stanford ‍‍‍^{y}	18	–	6	.750	39	–	15	.722
No. 24 Virginia ‍‍‍^{y}	13	–	10	.565	40	–	14	.741
Clemson ‍‍‍^{y}	13	–	11	.542	34	–	22	.607
Notre Dame ‍‍‍	11	–	13	.458	25	–	28	.472
Georgia Tech ‍‍‍^{y}	10	–	14	.417	32	–	29	.525
North Carolina ‍‍‍	9	–	15	.375	32	–	19	.627
Pittsburgh ‍‍‍	8	–	16	.333	25	–	27	.481
NC State ‍‍‍	7	–	16	.304	27	–	26	.509
California ‍‍‍	5	–	19	.208	15	–	37	.288
Syracuse ‍‍‍	4	–	18	.182	18	–	26	.409
Boston College ‍‍‍	3	–	21	.125	13	–	38	.255
† – Conference champion ‡ – Tournament champion y – Invited to the NCAA Tournament; As of May 24, 2026; Rankings from NFCA/USA Today

The 2026 Atlantic Coast Conference (ACC) softball tournament was held at Palmer Park on the campus of the University of Virginia in Charlottesville, Virginia, from May 6 through May 9, 2026. The event determines the champion of the Atlantic Coast Conference for the 2026 season. The 1st round, quarterfinals and semifinals were broadcast on the ACC Network. The championship game was broadcast by ESPN.

Clemson entered as the defending tournament champions, after winning their program's first title last year. They were the seventh seed and unable to defend their title as they lost in the First Round to North Carolina. Top seed Florida State went on to win the title, defeating Virginia Tech in the Final, 2–1. The title was the twentieth overall for the Seminoles' softball program and tenth for head coach Lonni Alameda. As tournament champions, Florida State earned the ACC's automatic bid to the 2026 NCAA Division I softball tournament.

== Seeding ==
The top 12 finishers of the ACC's 15 softball-playing members were seeded based on conference results from the regular season. The top four seeds earned a bye into the quarterfinals. There was a three-way tie for the third through fifth seed of the tournament as Louisville, Stanford, and Virginia Tech all finished with 18–6 regular season conference records. After the tiebreaker it was determined that Virginia Tech was the third seed, Stanford was the fourth seed, and Louisville was the fifth seed.

Team	W	L	Pct.	GB	Seed
Florida State	20	3	.870	—	1
Duke	20	4	.833	0.5	2
Virginia Tech	18	6	.750	2.5	3
Stanford	18	6	.750	2.5	4
Louisville	18	6	.750	2.5	5
Virginia	13	10	.565	7	6
Clemson	13	11	.542	7.5	7
Notre Dame	11	13	.458	9.5	8
Georgia Tech	10	14	.417	10.5	9
North Carolina	9	15	.375	11.5	10
Pittsburgh	8	16	.333	12.5	11
NC State	7	16	.304	13	12
California	5	19	.208	15.5	DNQ
Syracuse	4	18	.182	15.5	DNQ
Boston College	3	20	.130	17	DNQ

== Tournament ==
=== Bracket ===
First round
8	Notre Dame	3
9	Georgia Tech	13^{(5)}
5	Louisville	6
12	NC State	5
7	Clemson	2
10	North Carolina	4
6	Virginia	2
11	Pittsburgh	1

Quarter-finals
1	Florida State	2
9	Georgia Tech	1
4	Stanford	6^{(8)}
5	Louisville	5
2	Duke	16^{(6)}
10	North Carolina	8
3	Virginia Tech	3
6	Virginia	1

Semi-finals
1	Florida State	9
4	Stanford	0
2	Duke	0
3	Virginia Tech	5

Final
1	Florida State	2
3	Virginia Tech	1

=== Schedule and results ===
==== Schedule ====
Game	Time	Matchup	Score	Television	Attendance
First round – Wednesday, May 6
1	11:00 a.m.	No. 9 Georgia Tech vs. No. 8 Notre Dame	13–3^{(5)}	ACCN	421
2	1:30 p.m.	No. 12 NC State vs. No. 5 Louisville	5–6	ACCN	499
3	5:00 p.m.	No. 10 North Carolina vs. No. 7 Clemson	4–3	ACCN	1,185
4	7:30 p.m.	No. 11 Pittsburgh vs. No. 6 Virginia	1–2	ACCN	1,005
Quarterfinals – Thursday, May 7
5	11:00 a.m.	No. 9 Georgia Tech vs. No. 1 Florida State	1–2	ACCN	606
6	1:30 p.m.	No. 5 Louisville vs. No. 4 Stanford	5–6^{(8)}	ACCN	793
7	5:00 p.m.	No. 10 North Carolina vs. No. 2 Duke	8–16^{(6)}	ACCN	1,302
8	7:30 p.m.	No. 6 Virginia vs. No. 3 Virginia Tech	1–3	ACCN	1,814
Semifinals – Friday, May 8
9	1:00 p.m.	No. 4 Stanford vs. No. 1 Florida State	0–9	ACCN	989
10	3:30 p.m.	No. 3 Virginia Tech vs. No. 2 Duke	5–0	ACCN	1,325
Championship – Saturday, May 9
11	2:30 p.m.	No. 3 Virginia Tech vs. No. 1 Florida State	1–2	ESPN	2,240

==== Game summaries ====
===== First Round =====
May 6; 11:00 a.m. EDT; Game 1	(9) Georgia Tech	13–3 (F/5)	(8) Notre Dame	Palmer Park; Attendance: 421; Umpires: HP: Roger Potts 1B: Craig Hyde 2B: Tatem Stoelting 3B: Robbie Guest
May 6; 11:00 a.m. EDT; Game 1	WP: Madalyn Johnson (14–12)	Boxscore	LP: Micaela Kastor (7–13)	Palmer Park; Attendance: 421; Umpires: HP: Roger Potts 1B: Craig Hyde 2B: Tatem Stoelting 3B: Robbie Guest
May 6; 11:00 a.m. EDT; Game 1	HR: Leschber (13), Willer (15)	Boxscore		Palmer Park; Attendance: 421; Umpires: HP: Roger Potts 1B: Craig Hyde 2B: Tatem Stoelting 3B: Robbie Guest

May 6; 1:30 p.m. EDT; Game 2	(12) NC State	5–6	(5) Louisville	Palmer Park; Attendance: 499; Umpires: HP: Scott Mair 1B: Don Brown 2B: Alex Leap 3B: Smokey Edds
May 6; 1:30 p.m. EDT; Game 2	LP: Wynne Gore (7–4)	Boxscore	WP: Brooke Gray (14–2)	Palmer Park; Attendance: 499; Umpires: HP: Scott Mair 1B: Don Brown 2B: Alex Leap 3B: Smokey Edds
May 6; 1:30 p.m. EDT; Game 2	HR: Church (7)	Boxscore		Palmer Park; Attendance: 499; Umpires: HP: Scott Mair 1B: Don Brown 2B: Alex Leap 3B: Smokey Edds

May 6; 5:00 p.m. EDT; Game 3	(10) North Carolina	4–2	(7) Clemson	Palmer Park; Attendance: 1,185; Umpires: HP: Craig Hyde 1B: Tatem Stoelting 2B: Robbie Guest 3B: Roger Potts
May 6; 5:00 p.m. EDT; Game 3	WP: Jil Livengood (2–3)	Boxscore	LP: Sierra Manness (16–10)	Palmer Park; Attendance: 1,185; Umpires: HP: Craig Hyde 1B: Tatem Stoelting 2B: Robbie Guest 3B: Roger Potts
May 6; 5:00 p.m. EDT; Game 3	HR: Thompson (14)	Boxscore	HR: Pipkins (8)	Palmer Park; Attendance: 1,185; Umpires: HP: Craig Hyde 1B: Tatem Stoelting 2B: Robbie Guest 3B: Roger Potts

May 6; 7:30 p.m. EDT; Game 4	(11) Pittsburgh	1–2	(6) Virginia	Palmer Park; Attendance: 1,005; Umpires: HP: Don Brown 1B: Alex Leap 2B: Smokey Edds 3B: Scott Mair
May 6; 7:30 p.m. EDT; Game 4	LP: Kyra Pittman (7–9)	Boxscore	WP: Eden Bigham (14–4)	Palmer Park; Attendance: 1,005; Umpires: HP: Don Brown 1B: Alex Leap 2B: Smokey Edds 3B: Scott Mair
May 6; 7:30 p.m. EDT; Game 4		Boxscore	HR: Eaton (12)	Palmer Park; Attendance: 1,005; Umpires: HP: Don Brown 1B: Alex Leap 2B: Smokey Edds 3B: Scott Mair

===== Quarterfinals =====
May 7; 11:00 a.m. EDT; Game 5	(9) Georgia Tech	1–2	(1) Florida State	Palmer Park; Attendance: 606; Umpires: HP: Tatem Stoelting 1B: Robbie Guest 2B: Roger Potts 3B: Craig Hyde
May 7; 11:00 a.m. EDT; Game 5	LP: Sydine Watts (7–7)	Boxscore	WP: Jazzy Francik (21–2); Sv: Ashtyn Danley (4)	Palmer Park; Attendance: 606; Umpires: HP: Tatem Stoelting 1B: Robbie Guest 2B: Roger Potts 3B: Craig Hyde

May 7; 1:30 p.m. EDT; Game 6	(5) Louisville	5–6 (F/8)	(4) Stanford	Palmer Park; Attendance: 793; Umpires: HP: Alex Leap 1B: Smokey Edds 2B: Scott Mair 3B: Don Brown
May 7; 1:30 p.m. EDT; Game 6	LP: Brooke Gray (14–3)	Boxscore	WP: Zoe Prystajko (20–5)	Palmer Park; Attendance: 793; Umpires: HP: Alex Leap 1B: Smokey Edds 2B: Scott Mair 3B: Don Brown
May 7; 1:30 p.m. EDT; Game 6	HR: Despines 2 (11), Pickens (10)	Boxscore		Palmer Park; Attendance: 793; Umpires: HP: Alex Leap 1B: Smokey Edds 2B: Scott Mair 3B: Don Brown

May 7; 5:00 p.m. EDT; Game 7	(10) North Carolina	8–16 (F/6)	(2) Duke	Palmer Park; Attendance: 1,302; Umpires: HP: Robbie Guest 1B: Roger Potts 2B: Craig Hyde 3B: Tatem Stoelting
May 7; 5:00 p.m. EDT; Game 7	LP: Jil Livengood (2–4)	Boxscore	WP: KK Mathis (2–0)	Palmer Park; Attendance: 1,302; Umpires: HP: Robbie Guest 1B: Roger Potts 2B: Craig Hyde 3B: Tatem Stoelting
May 7; 5:00 p.m. EDT; Game 7	HR: Barbee (15), LeGette (27)	Boxscore		Palmer Park; Attendance: 1,302; Umpires: HP: Robbie Guest 1B: Roger Potts 2B: Craig Hyde 3B: Tatem Stoelting

May 7; 7:30 p.m. EDT; Game 8	(6) Virginia	1–3	(3) Virginia Tech	Palmer Park; Attendance: 1,814; Umpires: HP: Smokey Edds 1B: Scott Mair 2B: Don Brown 3B: Alex Leap
May 7; 7:30 p.m. EDT; Game 8	LP: Taylor Smith (6–2)	Boxscore	WP: Emma Mazzarone (16–4)	Palmer Park; Attendance: 1,814; Umpires: HP: Smokey Edds 1B: Scott Mair 2B: Don Brown 3B: Alex Leap

===== Semifinals =====
May 8; 1:00 p.m. EDT; Game 10	(4) Stanford	0–9	(1) Florida State	Palmer Park; Attendance: 989; Umpires: HP: Robbie Guest 1B: Roger Potts 2B: Tatem Stoelting 3B: Craig Hyde
May 8; 1:00 p.m. EDT; Game 10	LP: Alyssa Houston (5–3)	Boxscore	WP: Bella Dimitrijevic (7–2)	Palmer Park; Attendance: 989; Umpires: HP: Robbie Guest 1B: Roger Potts 2B: Tatem Stoelting 3B: Craig Hyde

May 8; 3:30 p.m. EDT; Game 10	(3) Virginia Tech	5–0	(2) Duke	Palmer Park; Attendance: 1,325; Umpires: HP: Alex Leap 1B: Don Brown 2B: Scott Mair 3B: Smokey Edds
May 8; 3:30 p.m. EDT; Game 10	WP: Bree Carrico (14–1); Sv: Emma Mazzarone (1)	Boxscore	LP: KK Mathis (2–1)	Palmer Park; Attendance: 1,325; Umpires: HP: Alex Leap 1B: Don Brown 2B: Scott Mair 3B: Smokey Edds
May 8; 3:30 p.m. EDT; Game 10	HR: Abromavage (18), Aldridge (10), Castine (15), Chatfield (14)	Boxscore		Palmer Park; Attendance: 1,325; Umpires: HP: Alex Leap 1B: Don Brown 2B: Scott Mair 3B: Smokey Edds

==== Championship game ====
2026 ACC tournament championship
No. 3 Virginia Tech	1–2	No. 1 Florida State

May 9, 2025 – 2:30 p.m. (EDT) at Palmer Park in Charlottesville, Virginia
Team	1	2	3	4	5	6	7	R	H	E
No. 3 Virginia Tech	1	0	0	0	0	0	0	1	4	0
No. 1 Florida State	0	2	0	0	0	0	X	2	3	1
WP: Jazzy Francik (22–2) LP: Emma Mazzarone (16–5); Attendance: 2,240; Boxscore

== All Tournament Team ==
Player	Team
Jessica Oakland	Duke
Addison Leschber	Georgia Tech
Bri Despines	Louisville
Madison Pickens	Louisville
Bree Carrico	Virginia Tech
Michelle Chatfield	Virginia Tech
Emma Mazzarone	Virginia Tech
Jasyoni Beachum	Florida State
Ashtyn Danley	Florida State
**Jazzy Francik**	Florida State
Isa Torres	Florida State

MVP in bold
