= List of Florida State Seminoles head softball coaches =

The Florida State Seminoles softball program is a college softball team that represents Florida State University in the Atlantic Coast Conference in the National Collegiate Athletic Association. The team has had two head coaches since it started playing organized softball in the 1978 season.

== Key ==
General
#	Number of coaches (Note: A running total of the number of head coaches.)
GC	Games coached

Overall
OW	Wins
OL	Losses
OT	Ties
O%	Winning percentage

Conference (Note: Florida State played as an independent until joining the Atlantic Coast Conference in 1992.)
CW	Wins
CL	Losses
CT	Ties
C%	Winning percentage

Postseason (Note: Postseason play involving the NCAA Division I softball championship or AIAW Women's College World Series.)
PA	Total appearances (Note: Postseason appearances include seasons with NCAA Division I softball championship bids since the tournament began in 1982.)
PW	Total wins
PL	Total losses
WA	Women's College World Series appearances (Note: Women's College World Series appearances include seasons with WCWS bids since the tournament began in 1969.)
WW	Women's College World Series wins
WL	Women's College World Series losses

Championships
CC	Conference regular season
CT	Conference tournament (Note: The Atlantic Coast Conference softball tournament began in 1992.)
NC	National championships (Note: Women's College World Series sponsored by either the AIAW or NCAA.)

== Coaches ==
List of head softball coaches showing season(s) coached, overall records, conference records, postseason records, championships and selected awards (Note: Statistics correct as of the end of the 2023 NCAA Division I softball season.)
#	Name	Term	GC	OW	OL	OT	O%	CW	CL	CT	C%	PA	WA	CCs	CTs	NCs
1	JoAnne Graf	1979–2008	1,976	1,483	487	6	.752	128	49	0	.723	24	10	11	10	2
2	Lonni Alameda	2009–present	1,101	863	236	2	.785	327	70	1	.823	17	5	9	10	1
