= 2024 Atlantic Coast Conference softball tournament =

- Teams: 10
- Format: Single-elimination tournament
- Finals site: Duke Softball Stadium; Durham, North Carolina
- Champions: Duke (2nd title)
- Runner-up: Florida State
- Winning coach: Marissa Young (2nd title)
- MVP: Jala Wright (Duke)
- Attendance: 7,314
- Television: ACCN; ESPN2

2024 Atlantic Coast Conference softball standings
	Conf.						Overall
Team	W		L		T	PCT	W		L		T	PCT
No. 7 Duke ‍†‍‡‍^{y}	20	–	4	–	0	.833	52	–	9	–	0	.852
No. 13 Florida State ‍‍‍^{y}	19	–	5	–	0	.792	46	–	16	–	0	.742
No. 17 Virginia Tech ‍‍‍^{y}	18	–	6	–	0	.750	40	–	13	–	1	.750
Clemson ‍‍‍^{y}	15	–	9	–	0	.625	35	–	19	–	0	.648
Virginia ‍‍‍^{y}	15	–	9	–	0	.625	34	–	20	–	0	.630
Georgia Tech ‍‍‍	12	–	12	–	0	.500	32	–	23	–	0	.582
North Carolina ‍‍‍	10	–	14	–	0	.417	30	–	20	–	0	.600
Boston College ‍‍‍	9	–	15	–	0	.375	30	–	24	–	0	.556
Syracuse ‍‍‍	9	–	15	–	0	.375	28	–	23	–	0	.549
Notre Dame ‍‍‍	9	–	15	–	0	.375	27	–	23	–	0	.540
Louisville ‍‍‍	8	–	16	–	0	.333	27	–	25	–	0	.519
NC State ‍‍‍	6	–	18	–	0	.250	30	–	23	–	0	.566
Pittsburgh ‍‍‍	6	–	18	–	0	.250	17	–	32	–	0	.347
† – Conference champion ‡ – Tournament champion y – Invited to the NCAA Tournament; As of June 11, 2024; Rankings from NFCA/USA Today

The 2024 Atlantic Coast Conference (ACC) softball tournament was held at Duke Softball Stadium on the campus of the Duke University in Durham, North Carolina, from May 8 through May 11, 2024. The event determines the champion of the Atlantic Coast Conference for the 2024 season. As the tournament winner, Duke earned the conference's automatic bid to the 2024 NCAA Division I softball tournament.

This was the sixth year of a 10-team tournament. The 1st round, quarterfinals and semifinals will be broadcast on the ACC Network. The championship game will be broadcast by ESPN2.

== Format and seeding ==
The top 10 finishers of the ACC's 13 softball-playing members were seeded based on conference results from the regular season. The bottom four seeds will play in an opening round to determine the quarterfinal matchups. Clemson and Virginia finished tied with 15–9 regular season records. Virginia earned the fourth seed by virtue of winning the two team's regular season series 2–1. Boston College, Notre Dame, and Syracuse finished in a three way tie with 9–15 records. Syracuse was the eighth-seed, Boston College was the ninth-seed, and Notre Dame was the tenth-seed after the tiebreaker procedure.

Team	W	L	Pct.	GB	Seed
Duke	20	4	.833	—	1
Florida State	19	5	.792	1	2
Virginia Tech	18	6	.750	2	3
Virginia	15	9	.625	5	4
Clemson	15	9	.625	5	5
Georgia Tech	12	12	.500	8	6
North Carolina	10	14	.417	10	7
Syracuse	9	15	.375	11	8
Boston College	9	15	.375	11	9
Notre Dame	9	15	.375	11	10
Louisville	8	16	.333	12	—
NC State	6	18	.250	14	—
Pittsburgh	6	18	.250	14	—

== Tournament ==
=== Bracket ===
First round
8	Syracuse	0
9	Boston College	1
7	North Carolina	4
10	Notre Dame	7

Quarterfinals
1	Duke	1
9	Boston College	0
4	Virginia	1
5	Clemson	8
2	Florida State	2
10	Notre Dame	0
3	Virginia Tech	2
6	Georgia Tech	6

Semifinals
1	Duke	4
5	Clemson	3
2	Florida State	10^{(5)}
6	Georgia Tech	2

Finals
1	Duke	6
2	Florida State	3

=== Schedule and results ===
==== Schedule ====
Game	Time	Matchup	Score	Television	Attendance
First round – Wednesday, May 8
1	1:00 p.m.	No. 9 Boston College vs. No. 8 Syracuse	1–0	ACCN	602
2	3:30 p.m.	No. 10 Notre Dame vs. No. 7 North Carolina	7–0	ACCN	602
Quarterfinals – Thursday, May 9
3	11:00 a.m.	No. 9 Boston College vs. No. 1 Duke	0–1	ACCN	473
4	1:30 p.m.	No. 5 Clemson vs. No. 4 Virginia	8–1	ACCN	327
5	5:00 p.m.	No. 10 Notre Dame vs. No. 2 Florida State	0–2	ACCN	1,744
6	7:30 p.m.	No. 6 Georgia Tech vs. No. 3 Virginia Tech	6–2	ACCN	1,744
Semifinals – Friday, May 10
7	1:00 p.m.	No. 1 Duke vs. No. 5 Clemson	4–3	ACCN	726
8	3:30 p.m.	No. 2 Florida State vs. No. 6 Georgia Tech	10–2^{(5)}	ACCN	1,168
Championship – Saturday, May 11
7	1:00 p.m.	No. 1 Duke vs. No. 2 Florida State	6–3	ESPN2	2,274

==== Game summaries ====
===== First Round =====
May 8; 1:00 p.m. ET; Game 1	(9) Boston College	1−0	(8) Syracuse	Durham Bulls Athletic Park; Attendance: 602; Umpires: HP: Aaron Golden, 1B: Emerus Addison, 2B: Tatem Stoelting, 3B: Alex Leap
May 8; 1:00 p.m. ET; Game 1	WP: Abby Dunning (14−13)	Box Score	LP: Lindsey Hendrix (13−4)	Durham Bulls Athletic Park; Attendance: 602; Umpires: HP: Aaron Golden, 1B: Emerus Addison, 2B: Tatem Stoelting, 3B: Alex Leap
May 8; 1:00 p.m. ET; Game 1	HR: none	Box Score	HR: none	Durham Bulls Athletic Park; Attendance: 602; Umpires: HP: Aaron Golden, 1B: Emerus Addison, 2B: Tatem Stoelting, 3B: Alex Leap

May 8; 3:30 p.m. ET; Game 2	(10) Notre Dame	7−4	(7) North Carolina	Durham Bulls Athletic Park; Attendance: 602; Umpires: HP: David Erwin, 1B: Craig Hyde, 2B: Jim Cooper, 3B: Scott Mair
May 8; 3:30 p.m. ET; Game 2	WP: Micaela Kastor (10−9)	Box Score	LP: Kenna Raye Dark (8−7)	Durham Bulls Athletic Park; Attendance: 602; Umpires: HP: David Erwin, 1B: Craig Hyde, 2B: Jim Cooper, 3B: Scott Mair
May 8; 3:30 p.m. ET; Game 2		Box Score	HR: Kronenberger (1), Holloway (1)	Durham Bulls Athletic Park; Attendance: 602; Umpires: HP: David Erwin, 1B: Craig Hyde, 2B: Jim Cooper, 3B: Scott Mair

===== Quarterfinals =====
May 9; 11:00 a.m. ET; Game 3	(9) Boston College	0−2	(1) Duke	Durham Bulls Athletic Park; Attendance: 473; Umpires: HP: Emerus Addison, 1B: Tatem Stoelting, 2B: Alex Leap, 3B: Aaron Golden
May 9; 11:00 a.m. ET; Game 3	LP: Abby Dunning (14−14)	Box Score	WP: Jala Wright (17−1)	Durham Bulls Athletic Park; Attendance: 473; Umpires: HP: Emerus Addison, 1B: Tatem Stoelting, 2B: Alex Leap, 3B: Aaron Golden
May 9; 11:00 a.m. ET; Game 3		Box Score	HR: Vega (1)	Durham Bulls Athletic Park; Attendance: 473; Umpires: HP: Emerus Addison, 1B: Tatem Stoelting, 2B: Alex Leap, 3B: Aaron Golden

May 9; 1:30 p.m. ET; Game 4	(5) Clemson	8−1	(4) Virginia	Durham Bulls Athletic Park; Attendance: 327; Umpires: HP: Craig Hyde, 1B: Jim Cooper, 2B: Scott Mair, 3B: David Erwin
May 9; 1:30 p.m. ET; Game 4	WP: Regan Spencer (10−3)	Box Score	LP: Courtney Layne (3−2)	Durham Bulls Athletic Park; Attendance: 327; Umpires: HP: Craig Hyde, 1B: Jim Cooper, 2B: Scott Mair, 3B: David Erwin
May 9; 1:30 p.m. ET; Game 4	HR: none	Box Score	HR: none	Durham Bulls Athletic Park; Attendance: 327; Umpires: HP: Craig Hyde, 1B: Jim Cooper, 2B: Scott Mair, 3B: David Erwin

May 9; 5:00 p.m. ET; Game 5	(10) Notre Dame	0−2	(2) Florida State	Durham Bulls Athletic Park; Attendance: 1,744; Umpires: HP: Tatem Stoelting, 1B: Alex Leap, 2B: Aaron Golden, 3B: Emerus Addison
May 9; 5:00 p.m. ET; Game 5	LP: Alexis Laudenslager (9−8)	Box Score	WP: Allison Royalty (7−5); Sv: Ashtyn Danley (2)	Durham Bulls Athletic Park; Attendance: 1,744; Umpires: HP: Tatem Stoelting, 1B: Alex Leap, 2B: Aaron Golden, 3B: Emerus Addison
May 9; 5:00 p.m. ET; Game 5	HR: none	Box Score	HR: Harding (2), Harp (1)	Durham Bulls Athletic Park; Attendance: 1,744; Umpires: HP: Tatem Stoelting, 1B: Alex Leap, 2B: Aaron Golden, 3B: Emerus Addison

May 9; 7:30 p.m. ET; Game 4	(6) Georgia Tech	6−2	(3) Virginia Tech	Durham Bulls Athletic Park; Attendance: 1,744; Umpires: HP: Jim Cooper, 1B: Scott Mair, 2B: David Erwin, 3B: Craig Hyde
May 9; 7:30 p.m. ET; Game 4	WP: Sophia Voyles (9−3); Sv: Makayla Coffield (2)	Box Score	LP: Lyndsey Grein (12-4)	Durham Bulls Athletic Park; Attendance: 1,744; Umpires: HP: Jim Cooper, 1B: Scott Mair, 2B: David Erwin, 3B: Craig Hyde
May 9; 7:30 p.m. ET; Game 4	HR: Gailey (1), Connelly (1), Domingue (1)	Box Score	HR: Ritter (1)	Durham Bulls Athletic Park; Attendance: 1,744; Umpires: HP: Jim Cooper, 1B: Scott Mair, 2B: David Erwin, 3B: Craig Hyde

===== Semifinals =====
May 10; 1:00 p.m. ET; Game 7	(1) Duke	4−3 (F/10)	(5) Clemson	Durham Bulls Athletic Park; Attendance: 726; Umpires: HP: Alex Leap, 1B: Aaron Golden, 2B: Emerus Addison, 3B: Tatem Stoelting
May 10; 1:00 p.m. ET; Game 7	WP: Lillie Walker (12−2)	Box Score	LP: Regan Spencer (10−4)	Durham Bulls Athletic Park; Attendance: 726; Umpires: HP: Alex Leap, 1B: Aaron Golden, 2B: Emerus Addison, 3B: Tatem Stoelting
May 10; 1:00 p.m. ET; Game 7	HR: none	Box Score	HR: Moore (1), Garcia (1)	Durham Bulls Athletic Park; Attendance: 726; Umpires: HP: Alex Leap, 1B: Aaron Golden, 2B: Emerus Addison, 3B: Tatem Stoelting

May 10; 4:30 p.m. ET; Game 8	(6) Georgia Tech	2–10 (F/5)	(2) Florida State	Durham Bulls Athletic Park; Attendance: 1,618; Umpires: HP: Scott Mair 1B: David Erwin 2B: Craig Hyde 3B: Jim Cooper
May 10; 4:30 p.m. ET; Game 8	LP: Kinsey Norton (9–7)	Box Score	WP: Ashtyn Danley (16–4)	Durham Bulls Athletic Park; Attendance: 1,618; Umpires: HP: Scott Mair 1B: David Erwin 2B: Craig Hyde 3B: Jim Cooper
May 10; 4:30 p.m. ET; Game 8	HR: none	Box Score	HR: Michaela Edenfield (1), Isa Torres (1)	Durham Bulls Athletic Park; Attendance: 1,618; Umpires: HP: Scott Mair 1B: David Erwin 2B: Craig Hyde 3B: Jim Cooper

=== Championship game ===
2024 ACC tournament championship
No. 1 Duke	6–3	No. 2 Florida State

May 11, 2024 – 2:30 p.m. (EDT) at Duke Softball Stadium in Durham, North Carolina
Team	1	2	3	4	5	6	7	R	H	E
No. 2 Florida State	0	0	0	3	0	0	0	3	4	1
No. 1 Duke	0	0	0	2	0	4	X	6	6	0
WP: Cassidy Curd (10–3) LP: Ashtyn Danley (16–5); Home runs: FSU: None; DUKE: Kalei Harding (14); Attendance: 2,274; Boxscore

== All Tournament Team ==
Player	Team
Abby Dunning	Boston College
Valerie Cagle	Clemson
Claire Davidson	Duke
Ana Gold	Duke
Aminah Vega	Duke
**Jala Wright**	Duke
Michaela Edenfield	Florida State
Kalei Harding	Florida State
Kaley Mudge	Florida State
Isa Torres	Florida State
Addison Amaral	Notre Dame

MVP in bold
