= 2022 Atlantic Coast Conference softball tournament =

- Teams: 10
- Format: Single-elimination tournament
- Finals site: Vartabedian Field; Pittsburgh, Pennsylvania
- Champions: Florida State (18th title)
- Runner-up: Clemson (2nd title game)
- Winning coach: Lonni Alameda (8th title)
- MVP: Kalei Harding (Florida State)
- Television: ACCN; ESPN2

2022 Atlantic Coast Conference softball standings
	Conf.				Overall
Team	W		L	PCT	W		L	PCT
No. 10 Virginia Tech ‍†‍‍^{y}	21	–	2	.913	46	–	10	.821
No. 12 Duke ‍‍‍^{y}	19	–	3	.864	44	–	11	.800
No. 13 Florida State ‍‍‡‍^{y}	19	–	5	.792	54	–	7	.885
Notre Dame ‍‍‍^{y}	16	–	5	.762	40	–	12	.769
No. 16 Clemson ‍‍‍^{y}	14	–	10	.583	42	–	17	.712
Virginia ‍‍‍	13	–	11	.542	28	–	26	.519
Georgia Tech ‍‍‍	11	–	13	.458	38	–	18	.679
Louisville ‍‍‍	10	–	14	.417	27	–	25	.519
Syracuse ‍‍‍	7	–	15	.318	26	–	21	.553
NC State ‍‍‍	7	–	17	.292	33	–	23	.589
North Carolina ‍‍‍	6	–	18	.250	23	–	28	.451
Boston College ‍‍‍	6	–	18	.250	20	–	27	.426
Pittsburgh ‍‍‍	2	–	20	.091	14	–	27	.341
† – Conference champion ‡ – Tournament champion y – Invited to the NCAA tournament As of June 14, 2022; Rankings from NFCA

The 2022 Atlantic Coast Conference (ACC) softball tournament was held at Vartabedian Field on the campus of the University of Pittsburgh in Pittsburgh, Pennsylvania May 11 through May 14, 2022. The event determined the champion of the Atlantic Coast Conference for the 2022 season. The winner of the tournament earned the ACC's bid to the 2022 NCAA Division I softball tournament.

This was the fourth year of a 10-team tournament. The 1st Round, quarterfinals and semifinals were shown on the ACC Network. The championship game was broadcast by ESPN2.

== Format and seeding ==
The top 10 finishers of the ACC's 13 softball-player members were seeded based on conference results from the regular season. The bottom four seeds played in an opening round to determine the quarterfinal matchups.

Team	W	L	Pct.	GB	Seed
Virginia Tech	21	2	.913	–	1
Duke	19	3	.864	1.5	2
Florida State	19	5	.792	2.5	3
Notre Dame	16	5	.762	4	4
Clemson	14	10	.583	7.5	5
Virginia	13	11	.542	8.5	6
Georgia Tech	11	13	.458	10.5	7
Louisville	10	14	.417	11.5	8
Syracuse	7	15	.318	13.5	9
NC State	7	17	.292	14.5	10
North Carolina	6	18	.250	15.5	—
Boston College	6	18	.250	15.5	—
Pittsburgh	2	20	.091	18.5	—

== Tournament ==
=== Bracket ===
First round
8	Louisville	0
9	Syracuse	2
7	Georgia Tech	4
10	NC State	2

Quarterfinals
1	Virginia Tech	2
9	Syracuse	1
4	Notre Dame	3
5	Clemson	7
2	Duke	9
7	Georgia Tech	6
3	Florida State	5
6	Virginia	3

Semifinals
1	Virginia Tech	1
5	Clemson	4
2	Duke	6
3	Florida State	8

Finals
5	Clemson	6
3	Florida State	8

=== Game schedule and results ===
Time	Game	Winner	Score	Loser	Television	Notes
First Round - Wednesday, May 11
1:00 p.m.	Game 1	(9) Syracuse	2–0	(8) Louisville	ACCN	
3:30 p.m.	Game 2	(7) Georgia Tech	4–2	(10) NC State	ACCN	
Quarterfinals - Thursday, May 12
11:00 a.m.	Game 3	(1) Virginia Tech	2–1	(9) Syracuse	ACCN	
1:30 p.m.	Game 4	(5) Clemson	7–3	(4) Notre Dame	ACCN	
5:00 p.m.	Game 5	(2) Duke	9–6	(7) Georgia Tech	ACCN	
7:30 p.m.	Game 6	(3) Florida State	5–3	(6) Virginia	ACCN	
Semifinals - Friday, May 13
1:00 p.m.	Game 7	(5) Clemson	4–1	(1) Virginia Tech	ACCN	
3:30 p.m.	Game 8	(3) Florida State	8–6	(2) Duke	ACCN	
Final - Saturday, May 14
1:00 p.m.	Game 9	(3) Florida State	8–6	(5) Clemson	ESPN2	

=== Championship game ===
ACC Championship
(5) Clemson Tigers	6-8	(3) Florida State Seminoles

May 14, 2022, 12:00 p.m. (EDT) at Vartabedian Field in Pittsburgh, Pennsylvania
Team	1	2	3	4	5	6	7	R	H	E
(5) Clemson	1	3	0	1	0	0	1	6	10	3
(3) Florida State	3	1	0	0	0	4	X	8	6	2
WP: Kathryn Sandercock (29-1) LP: Valerie Cagle (15-8); Home runs: CLEM: Russ; FSU: Harding, Leonard; Attendance: 667; Boxscore

== All Tournament Team ==
Player	Team
**Kalei Harding**	Florida State
Kathryn Sandercock	Florida State
Devyn Flaherty	Florida State
Mack Leonard	Florida State
Alia Logoleo	Clemson
Valerie Cagle	Clemson
McKenzie Clark	Clemson
Kristina Foreman	Duke
Caroline Jacobsen	Duke
Kennedy Cowden	Georgia Tech
Ariana Adams	Syracuse

MVP in bold
