= 2021 Atlantic Coast Conference softball tournament =

- Teams: 10
- Format: Single-elimination tournament
- Finals site: Ulmer Stadium; Louisville, Kentucky
- Champions: Duke (1st title)
- Runner-up: Clemson
- Winning coach: Marissa Young (1st title)
- MVP: Peyton St. George (Duke)
- Television: ACCN; ESPN2

2021 Atlantic Coast Conference softball standings
	Conf.						Overall
Team	W		L		T	PCT	W		L		T	PCT
No. 18 Clemson ‍†‍‍^{y}	29	–	5	–	0	.853	44	–	8	–	0	.846
No. 2 Florida State ‍‍‍^{y}	26	–	5	–	1	.828	49	–	12	–	1	.798
No. 20 Duke ‍‍‡‍^{y}	26	–	10	–	0	.722	44	–	12	–	0	.786
No. 14 Virginia Tech ‍‍‍^{y}	23	–	11	–	0	.676	37	–	15	–	0	.712
Notre Dame ‍‍‍^{y}	20	–	10	–	0	.667	33	–	15	–	0	.688
Louisville ‍‍‍	15	–	21	–	1	.419	21	–	28	–	1	.430
NC State ‍‍‍	15	–	22	–	0	.405	26	–	25	–	0	.510
Syracuse ‍‍‍	12	–	20	–	0	.375	20	–	24	–	0	.455
Georgia Tech ‍‍‍	11	–	19	–	0	.367	20	–	26	–	0	.435
North Carolina ‍‍‍	10	–	19	–	0	.345	14	–	26	–	0	.350
Pittsburgh ‍‍‍	12	–	24	–	0	.333	17	–	29	–	0	.370
Virginia ‍‍‍	10	–	27	–	0	.270	15	–	33	–	0	.313
Boston College ‍‍‍	8	–	24	–	0	.250	13	–	32	–	0	.289
† – Conference champion ‡ – Tournament champion y – Invited to the NCAA tournament As of June 15, 2021; Rankings from NFCA/USA Today

The 2021 Atlantic Coast Conference (ACC) softball tournament was held at Ulmer Stadium on the campus of the University of Louisville in Louisville, Kentucky from May 12 through May 15, 2021. The event determined the champion of the Atlantic Coast Conference for the 2021 season. As the winner of the tournament, Duke earned the ACC's automatic bid to the 2021 NCAA Division I softball tournament.

This was the third year of a 10-team tournament. The first round, quarterfinals and semifinals were shown on the ACC Network. The championship game was broadcast by ESPN2.

== Format and seeding ==
The top 10 finishers of the ACC's 13 softball-player members will be seeded based on conference results from the regular season. The bottom four seeds will play in an opening round to determine the quarterfinal matchups.

Team	W	L	T	Pct.	GB	Seed
Clemson	29	5	0	.848	—	1
Florida State	26	5	1	.828	1.5	2
Duke	26	10	0	.722	4.5	3
Virginia Tech	23	11	0	.676	6	4
Notre Dame	20	10	0	.667	7	5
Louisville	15	21	1	.419	15	6
NC State	15	22	0	.405	15.5	7
Syracuse	12	20	0	.375	15.5	8
Georgia Tech	11	19	0	.367	16	9
North Carolina	10	19	0	.345	16.5	10
Pittsburgh	12	24	0	.333	18	—
Virginia	10	27	0	.270	20.5	—
Boston College	8	24	0	.250	20.5	—

== Tournament ==
=== Bracket ===
First round
8	Syracuse	0
9	Georgia Tech	6
7	NC State	4
10	North Carolina	2

Quarterfinals
1	Clemson	2
9	Georgia Tech	0
4	Virginia Tech	4
5	Notre Dame	1
2	Florida State	2
7	NC State	0
3	Duke	4
6	Louisville	3

Semifinals
1	Clemson	2
4	Virginia Tech	0
2	Florida State	3
3	Duke	4

Finals
1	Clemson	0
3	Duke	1

=== Game schedule and results ===
Time	Game	Winner	Score	Loser	Television	Reference
First Round - Wednesday, May 12
1:00 p.m.	Game 1	(9) Georgia Tech	6–0	(8) Syracuse	ACCN	
3:30 p.m.	Game 2	(7) NC State	4–2	(10) North Carolina	ACCN	
Quarterfinals - Thursday, May 13
11:00 a.m.	Game 3	(1) Clemson	2–0	(9) Georgia Tech	ACCN	
1:30 p.m.	Game 4	(4) Virginia Tech	4–1	(5) Notre Dame	ACCN	
5:00 p.m.	Game 5	(2) Florida State	2–0	(7) NC State	ACCN	
7:30 p.m.	Game 6	(3) Duke	4–3	(6) Louisville	ACCN	
Semifinals - Friday, May 14
1:00 p.m.	Game 7	(1) Clemson	2–0	(4) Virginia Tech	ACCN	
3:30 p.m.	Game 8	(3) Duke	4–3	(2) Florida State	ACCN	
Final - Saturday, May 15
Noon	Game 9	(3) Duke	1–0	(1) Clemson	ESPN	

=== Championship game ===
ACC Championship
(3) Duke Blue Devils	vs.	(1) Clemson Tigers

May 15, 2021, 12:00 p.m. (EDT) at Ulmer Stadium in Louisville, Kentucky
Team	1	2	3	4	5	6	7	R	H	E
(3) Duke	0	0	0	0	0	1	0	1	2	2
(1) Clemson	0	0	0	0	0	0	0	0	3	1
WP: Walters (17–3) LP: Cagle (26–5) Sv: St. George (4); Home runs: DUKE: None; CLEM: None; Attendance: 485; Boxscore

== All Tournament Team ==
Player	Team
Cammy Pereira	Clemson
Valerie Cagle	Clemson
Kristina Foreman	Duke
**Peyton St. George**	Duke
Gisele Tapia	Duke
Shelby Walters	Duke
Sydney Sherrill	Florida State
Blake Neleman	Georgia Tech
Celene Funke	Louisville
Taty Forbes	NC State
Keely Rochard	Virginia Tech

MVP in bold
