= Florida State Seminoles softball =

American college softball team

- University: Florida State University
- Head coach: Lonni Alameda (19th season)
- Conference: ACC
- Location: Tallahassee, Florida, US
- Home stadium: JoAnne Graf Field (capacity: 1,000)
- Nickname: Florida State Seminoles
- Colors: Garnet and gold

NCAA Tournament champions
- 2018

AIAW Slow-pitch Tournament champions
- 1981, 1982

NCAA WCWS runner-up
- 2021, 2023

NCAA WCWS appearances
- 1987, 1990, 1991, 1992, 1993, 2002, 2004, 2014, 2016, 2018, 2021, 2023

AIAW Slow-pitch WCWS appearances
- 1981, 1982

NCAA super regional appearances
- 2006, 2013, 2014, 2015, 2016, 2017, 2018, 2019, 2021, 2023, 2024, 2025

NCAA Tournament appearances
- 1986, 1987, 1988, 1989, 1990, 1991, 1992, 1993, 1994, 1995, 1996, 1998, 2000, 2001, 2002, 2003, 2004, 2005, 2006, 2007, 2008, 2009, 2010, 2011, 2012, 2013, 2014, 2015, 2016, 2017, 2018, 2019, 2021, 2022, 2023, 2024, 2025, 2026

Conference tournament championships
- 1992, 1993, 1995, 1996, 1997, 1998, 1999, 2000, 2003, 2004, 2011, 2014, 2015, 2016, 2017, 2018, 2019, 2022, 2023, 2026

Regular-season conference championships
- 1992, 1993, 1994, 1995, 1997, 1999, 2000, 2001, 2002, 2003, 2004, 2013, 2014, 2015, 2016, 2017, 2018, 2023, 2025, 2026

The Florida State Seminoles women's softball team represents Florida State University (variously Florida State or FSU) in the sport of softball. Florida State competes in Division I of the National Collegiate Athletic Association (NCAA) and the Atlantic Coast Conference (ACC).

The team has compiled an all-time win percentage of .764. The Seminoles have won twenty ACC championships (winning both the regular season and tournament titles on fifteen of those occasions), two AIAW slow-pitch national championships, and one NCAA championship. Florida State has made thirty-eight appearances in the NCAA Tournament, appearing twenty-six consecutive times, advancing to the Super Regional round on twelve occasions, and reaching Women's College World Series on twelve occasions, going on to the semifinals on five occasions and the championship series on three occasions. Jessica van der Linden and Lacey Waldrop have won the USA Softball Collegiate Player of the Year award while forty-one Seminole players have been honored as All-Americans while seven have been drafted into the National Pro Fastpitch League, three have been drafted into the Women Professional Fastpitch League, and one has been drafted into the Athletes Unlimited Softball League. Florida State coaches JoAnne Graf and Lonni Alameda have been inducted into the NFCA Hall of Fame.

The Seminoles play their home games at JoAnne Graf Field on the university's Tallahassee campus, and are currently led by head coach Lonni Alameda.

== Program history ==
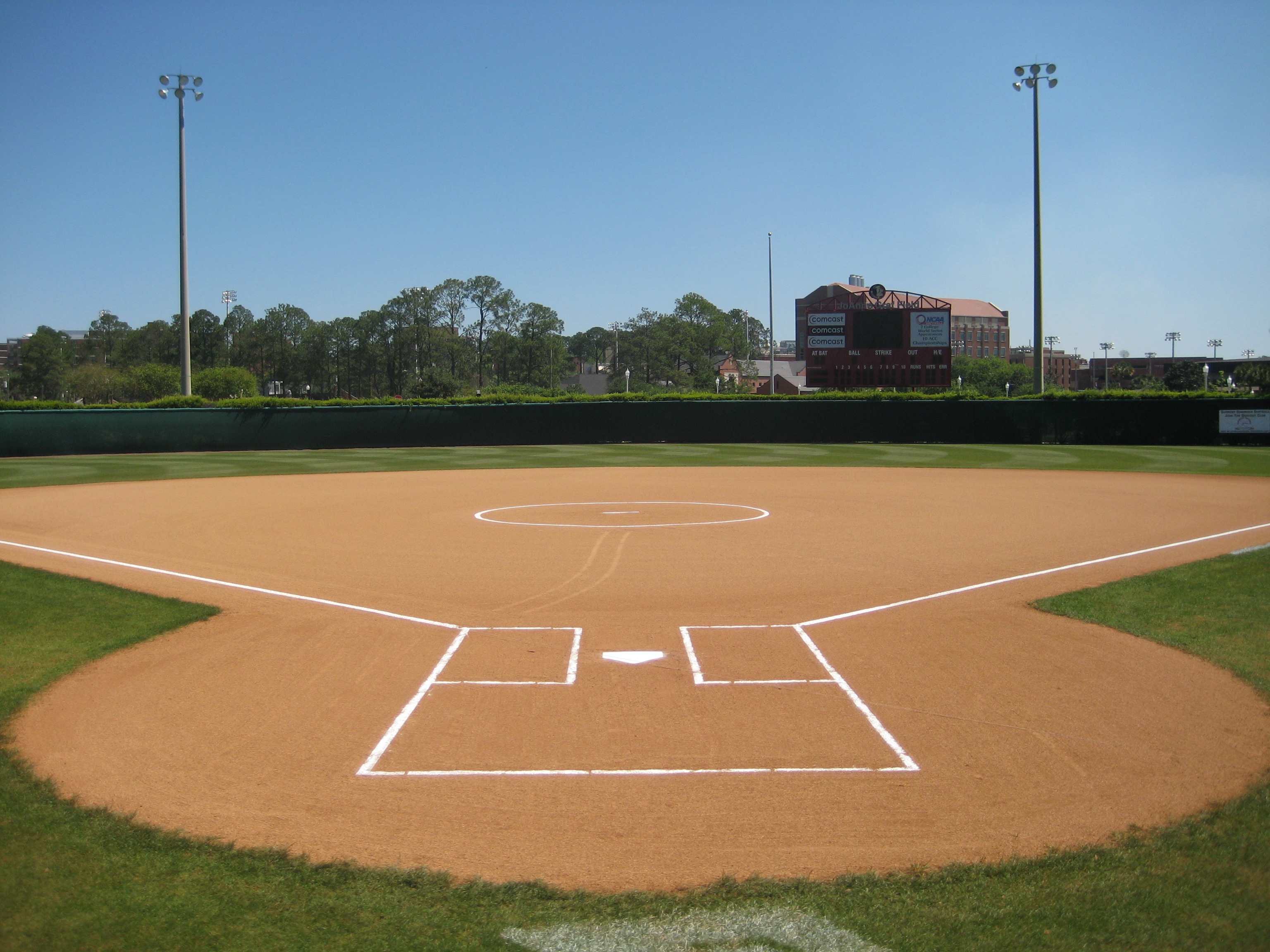
Florida State's field is named after former head coach, JoAnne Graf.

Florida State has been one of the most successful softball programs in the history of collegiate softball. As of the end of the 2025 season, only nine teams in the history of the NCAA have made more WCWS appearances than FSU, and no school east of Arizona has been to more NCAA Tournaments than the Seminoles. Florida State has made a regional appearance every year since 2000. Florida State has never endured a losing season and the Seminoles have achieved 42 forty-win seasons; under current head coach Lonni Alameda, the Seminoles have achieved 16 forty-win seasons, including eight straight from 2012 to 2019, which also included six consecutive ACC titles from 2014 to 2019.

2018 season

The 2018 season saw the Seminoles win the ACC regular season title for the sixth consecutive year and the ACC tournament title for the fifth consecutive year, defeating Pittsburgh in the ACC championship game with a walk-off homerun. securing a spot in the NCAA Tournament as the sixth overall seed.

The Seminoles defeated Auburn and Jacksonville State twice to win the Tallahassee Regional and advance to the Tallahassee Super Regional, where they defeated LSU in a double header after dropping the first game of the series, clinching a spot in the Women's College World Series.

In the World Series, the Seminoles dropped their opener to UCLA after blowing a late lead; they went on to win their next four games: defeating Georgia, top-seed Oregon, and UCLA twice in the semifinals to advance to the national championship for the first time to face Washington. Florida State went on to sweep the Huskies to win the national title, becoming the first team to lose their first game in the World Series and go on to win the title during the championship series era. The Seminoles also tied the record for most elimination game wins, going 6-0 over the course of the postseason.

== Venue ==
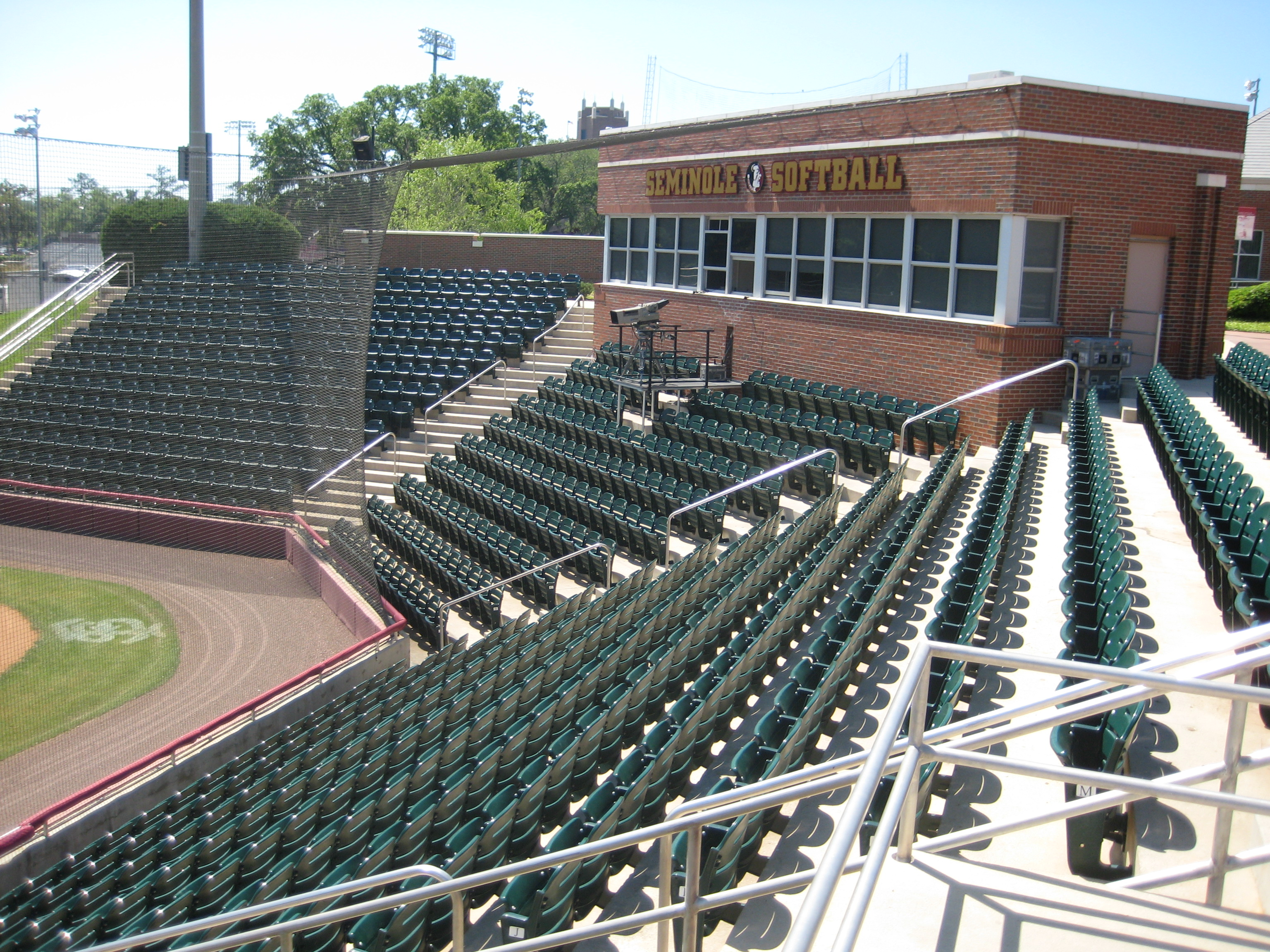
The Seminoles plays home games at JoAnne Graf Field.

The softball team plays at the Seminole Softball Complex; the field is named for JoAnne Graf, the winningest coach in school history and the second-winningest coach in college softball history.

== Head coaches ==
- Records are through the 2026 season

Tenure	Coach	Years	Record	Pct.
1979–2008	JoAnne Graf	30	1,483–487–6	.752
2009–present	Lonni Alameda	18	863–236–2	.785

=== Current Coaching Staff ===
Name	Position coachedf	Consecutive season at Florida State in current position
Lonni Alameda	Head coach	17th
Travis Wilson	Assistant coach	14th
Troy Cameron	Assistant coach	6th
Kaleigh Rafter	Assistant coach	4th
Kristin Tubeck	Director of Softball Operations	5th

== Records and results ==
=== Year-by-year results ===
National Champions	Conference champions

Note: W = Wins, L = Losses, T = Ties, C = Conference

Season	Coach	Conference	W	L	T	CW	CL	CT	Post Season
1978		Independent	46	9	0				
1979	JoAnne Graf	Independent	26	15	0				
1980	JoAnne Graf	Independent	37	10	0				
1981	JoAnne Graf	Independent	54	7	0				AIAW Slow-pitch National Champions
1982	JoAnne Graf	Independent	56	10	0				AIAW Slow-pitch National Champions
1983	JoAnne Graf	Independent	46	11	0				ASA National Runner-up
1984	JoAnne Graf	Independent	41	5	2				
1985	JoAnne Graf	Independent	50	12	2				
1986	JoAnne Graf	Independent	42	7	0				NCAA Regional
1987	JoAnne Graf	Independent	50	14	0				Women's College World Series
1988	JoAnne Graf	Independent	44	14	0				NCAA Regional
1989	JoAnne Graf	Independent	39	14	0				NCAA Regional
1990	JoAnne Graf	Independent	47	16	0				Women's College World Series
1991	JoAnne Graf	Independent	62	12	0				Women's College World Series
1992	JoAnne Graf	ACC	63	9	0	4	2	0	Women's College World Series
1993	JoAnne Graf	ACC	52	9	0	4	0	0	Women's College World Series
1994	JoAnne Graf	ACC	50	19	0	9	2	0	NCAA Regional
1995	JoAnne Graf	ACC	58	15	0	6	0	0	NCAA Regional
1996	JoAnne Graf	ACC	51	21	0	5	3	0	NCAA Regional
1997	JoAnne Graf	ACC	45	19	1	7	1	0	
1998	JoAnne Graf	ACC	51	21	0	5	3	0	NCAA Regional
1999	JoAnne Graf	ACC	40	25	1	6	2	0	
2000	JoAnne Graf	ACC	51	27	0	6	2	0	NCAA Regional
2001	JoAnne Graf	ACC	58	12	0	7	1	0	NCAA Regional
2002	JoAnne Graf	ACC	55	20	0	6	0	0	Women's College World Series
2003	JoAnne Graf	ACC	46	11	0	8	0	0	NCAA Regional
2004	JoAnne Graf	ACC	62	12	0	9	1	0	Women's College World Series
2005	JoAnne Graf	ACC	35	28	0	11	6	0	NCAA Regional
2006	JoAnne Graf	ACC	44	30	0	10	10	0	NCAA Super Regional
2007	JoAnne Graf	ACC	44	25	0	13	7	0	NCAA Regional
2008	JoAnne Graf	ACC	38	28	0	12	9	0	NCAA Regional
2009	Lonni Alameda	ACC	44	16	0	17	4	0	NCAA Regional
2010	Lonni Alameda	ACC	44	18	0	12	9	0	NCAA Regional
2011	Lonni Alameda	ACC	32	28	0	9	11	0	NCAA Regional
2012	Lonni Alameda	ACC	47	16	0	16	5	0	NCAA Regional
2013	Lonni Alameda	ACC	44	19	0	18	2	0	NCAA Super Regional
2014	Lonni Alameda	ACC	55	9	0	24	3	0	Women's College World Series
2015	Lonni Alameda	ACC	49	14	0	20	3	0	NCAA Super Regional
2016	Lonni Alameda	ACC	55	10	0	21	2	0	Women's College World Series
2017	Lonni Alameda	ACC	55	8	1	24	0	0	NCAA Super Regional
2018	Lonni Alameda	ACC	58	12	0	21	3	0	NCAA National Champions
2019	Lonni Alameda	ACC	55	10	0	19	5	0	NCAA Super Regional
2020	Lonni Alameda	ACC	17	7	0	1	0	0	season canceled due to the COVID-19 pandemic
2021	Lonni Alameda	ACC	49	13	1	26	5	1	NCAA National Runner-up
2022	Lonni Alameda	ACC	54	7	0	19	5	0	NCAA Regional
2023	Lonni Alameda	ACC	58	11	0	22	2	0	NCAA National Runner-up
2024	Lonni Alameda	ACC	46	16	0	19	5	0	NCAA Super Regional
2025	Lonni Alameda	ACC	49	12	0	18	3	0	NCAA Super Regional
2026	Lonni Alameda	ACC	52	10	0	21	3	0	NCAA Regional
Total:			2,346	723	8	455	119	1	
Win Percentage:			.764			.792			

=== All-time record vs. ACC teams ===
Florida State maintains a winning percentage against all current ACC softball teams.

Opponent	Won	Lost	Tie	Percentage	Streak	First Meeting
Boston College	52	4	0	.929	Won 7	2001
California	6	1	0	.857	Won 6	2015
Clemson	10	1	0	.909	Won 3	2022
Duke	15	5	0	.750	Won 4	2019
Georgia Tech	77	26	0	.748	Won 31	1990
Louisville	23	9	1	.712	Lost 1	2002
North Carolina	81	27	0	.750	Won 7	1984
North Carolina State	50	13	0	.794	Won 11	2004
Notre Dame	33	7	0	.825	Won 16	1991
Pittsburgh	28	3	0	.903	Won 6	2002
Stanford	3	4	0	.429	Won 1	2013
Syracuse	32	4	0	.889	Won 3	2001
Virginia	93	20	0	.823	Won 2	1986
Virginia Tech	39	21	0	.650	Won 1	2005
Totals	544	144	1	.790		

=== Rivalries ===
Opponent	Won	Lost	Tie	Percentage	Streak	First Meeting
Florida	25	30	0	.455	Lost 1	1997
Totals	25	30	0	.455		

=== College World Series ===
Florida State has made 12 trips to the Women's College World Series, winning the title in 2018 and finishing as runner-up in 2021 and 2023; the Seminoles have advanced to the semifinals on five occasions, in 2002, 2016, 2018, 2021, and 2023.

Year	W	L	Percent
1987	0	2	.000
1990	1	2	.333
1991	0	2	.000
1992	0	2	.000
1993	2	2	.500
2002	2	2	.500
2004	1	2	.333
2014	0	2	.000
2016	2	2	.500
2018	6	1	.857
2021	5	3	.625
2023	3	2	.600
Total:	22	24	.478

==== NCAA Tournament seeding history ====
Florida State has been a national seed in the tournament thirteen times since national seeding began in 2005.

Years →	'09	'14	'15	'16	'17	'18	'19	'21	'22	'23	'24	'25	'26
Seeds →	16	8	9	8	4	6	4	10	2	3	15	5	9

== Championships ==
=== National championships ===
Season	Type	Coach
1981	AIAW slow-pitch	JoAnne Graf
1982	AIAW slow-pitch	JoAnne Graf
2018	NCAA fast-pitch	Lonni Alameda
Total National Championships		3

=== Conference regular season championships ===
Season	Record	Coach
1992	4–2	JoAnne Graf
1993	4–0	JoAnne Graf
1994	9–2	JoAnne Graf
1995	6–0	JoAnne Graf
1997	7–1	JoAnne Graf
1999	6–2	JoAnne Graf
2000	6–2	JoAnne Graf
2001	7–1	JoAnne Graf
2002	6–0	JoAnne Graf
2003	8–0	JoAnne Graf
2004	9–1	JoAnne Graf
2013	18–2	Lonni Alameda
2014	24–3	Lonni Alameda
2015	20–3	Lonni Alameda
2016	21–2	Lonni Alameda
2017	24–0	Lonni Alameda
2018	21–3	Lonni Alameda
2023	22–2	Lonni Alameda
2025	18–3	Lonni Alameda
2026	21–3	Lonni Alameda
Total Conference Titles		20

==== Division championships ====
Season	Division	Coach
2018	Atlantic	Lonni Alameda
2019	Atlantic	Lonni Alameda
Total Division Titles		2

=== Conference tournament championships ===
Florida State has made twenty-eight appearances in the ACC Championship, with a 20–8 record.

Season	Coach
1992	JoAnne Graf
1993	JoAnne Graf
1995	JoAnne Graf
1996	JoAnne Graf
1997	JoAnne Graf
1998	JoAnne Graf
1999	JoAnne Graf
2000	JoAnne Graf
2003	JoAnne Graf
2004	JoAnne Graf
2011	Lonni Alameda
2014	Lonni Alameda
2015	Lonni Alameda
2016	Lonni Alameda
2017	Lonni Alameda
2018	Lonni Alameda
2019	Lonni Alameda
2022	Lonni Alameda
2023	Lonni Alameda
2026	Lonni Alameda
Total Conference Championships	20

== Individual honors and awards ==
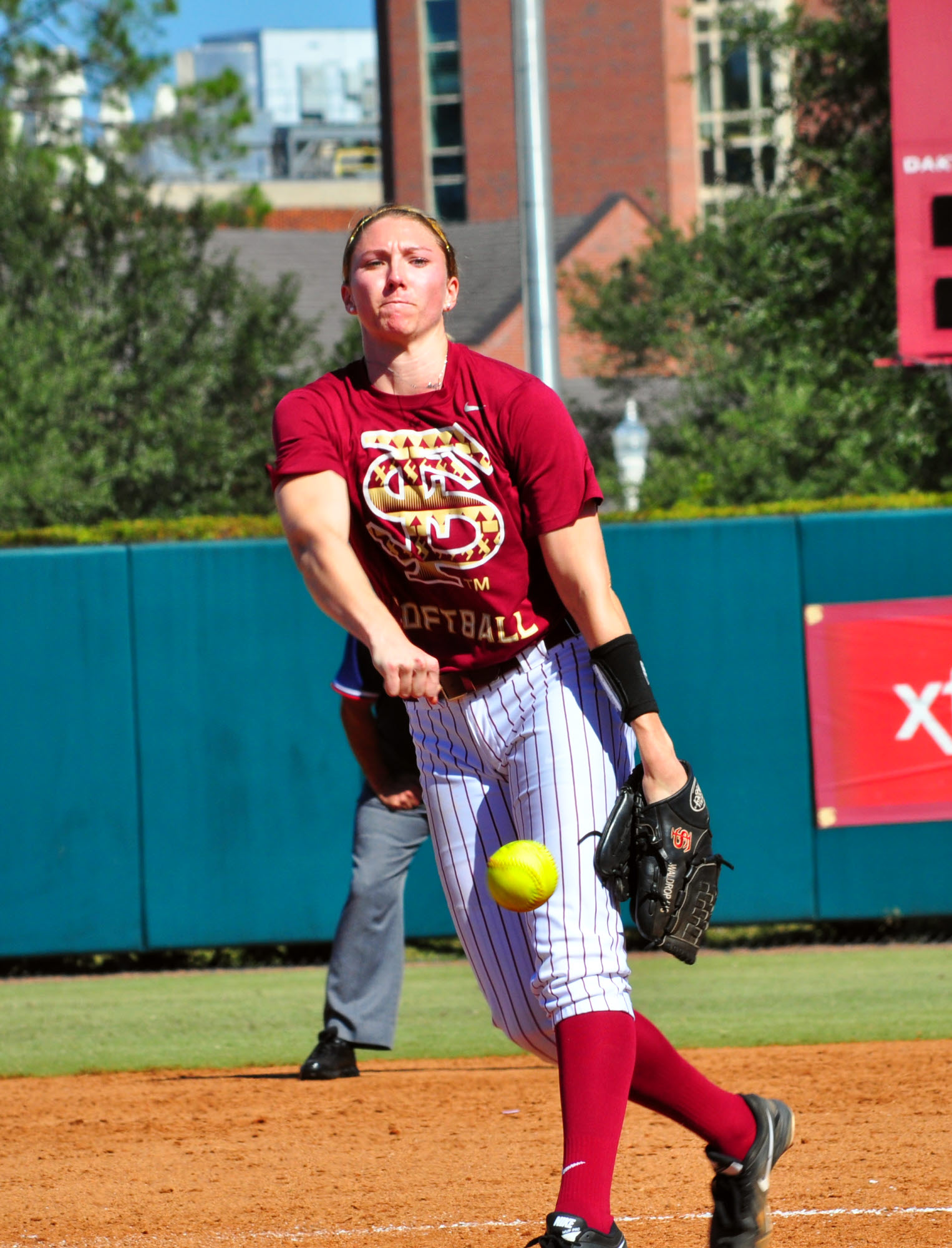
Lacey Waldrop received several national honors during her time as a Seminole.

=== National awards ===
USA Softball Collegiate Player of the Year

USA Softball Collegiate Player of the Year winners
Year	Player
2004	Jessica van der Linden
2014	Lacey Waldrop

NFCA National Freshman of the Year

NFCA National Freshman of the Year winner
Year	Player
2024	Jaysoni Beachum

Softball America Freshman of the Year

Softball America Freshman of the Year winner
Year	Player
2024	Jaysoni Beachum

Softball America Defensive Player of the Year

Softball America Defensive Player of the Year winner
Year	Player
2026	Isa Torres

D1 Softball National Player of the Year

Softball America Player of the Year winner
Year	Player
2026	Isa Torres

Broderick Award

Broderick Award winner
Year	Player
1982	Darby Cottle

Gold Glove Award

Rawlings Gold Glove Award winner
Year	Player
2022	Sydney Sherrill
2026	Isa Torres

Honda Sports Award

Honda Sports Award (Softball) winner
Year	Player
2004	Jessica van der Linden

=== Conference awards ===
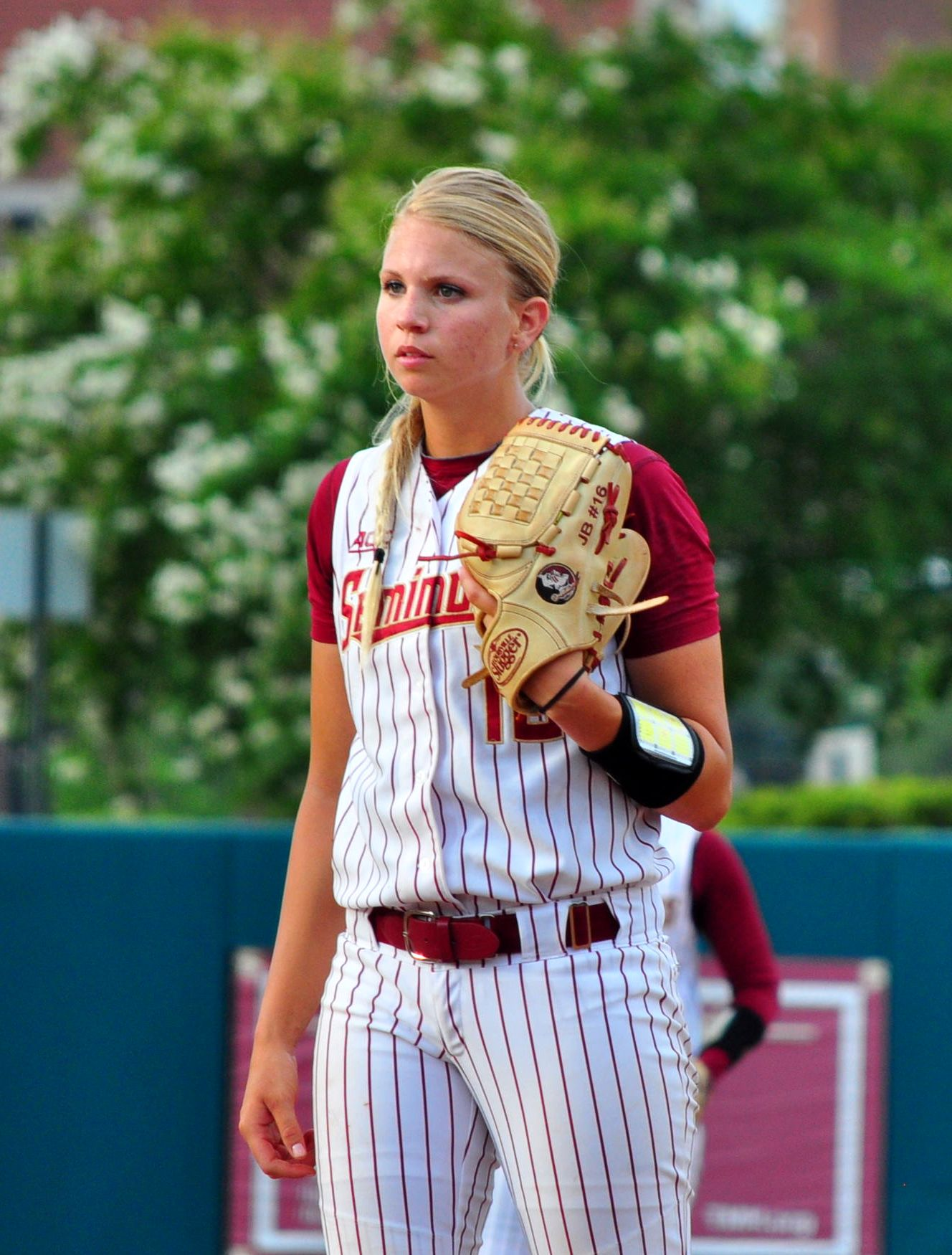
Jessica Burroughs received multiple conference honors during her time as a Seminole.

ACC Player of the Year

- Toni Gutierrez (1992)
- Cindy Lawton (1995)
- Shamalene Wilson (1996)
- Jessica van der Linden (2003, 2004)
- Maddie O'Brien (2014)
- Alex Powers (2016)
- Jessica Warren (2017, 2018)
- Isa Torres (2026)

ACC Pitcher of the Year

- Sarah Hamilton (2009)
- Lacey Waldrop (2014, 2015)
- Jessica Burroughs (2016, 2017)
- Kylee Hanson (2018)
- Kathryn Sandercock (2023)
- Jazzy Francik (2026)

ACC Freshman of the Year

- Shamalene Wilson (1993)
- Kristy Hull (1995)
- Jessica van der Linden (2001)
- Veronica Wootson (2004)
- Tiffany McDonald (2005)
- Monica Montez (2007)
- Jessica Warren (2015)
- Sydney Sherrill (2018)
- Jaysoni Beachum (2024)

ACC Defensive Player of the Year

- Jessica Warren (2017)
- Sydney Sherrill (2019, 2021, 2022)
- Isa Torres (2026)

ACC Coach of the Year

- JoAnne Graf (1992, 1993, 1997, 2001, 2003, 2004)
- Lonni Alameda (2013, 2014, 2015, 2016, 2017, 2023, 2025, 2026)

=== All-Americans ===
- Jaysoni Beachum
- Serita Brooks
- Jessica Burroughs
- Susan Buttery
- Myssi Calkins
- Darby Cottle
- Danielle Cox
- Ashtyn Danley
- Lisa Davidson
- Natalie Drouin
- Michaela Edenfield
- Renee Espinoza
- Jazzy Francik
- Kristy Fuentes
- Toni Gutierrez
- Kylee Hanson
- Kennedy Harp
- Anna Hinde
- Casey Hunter
- Meghan King
- Morgan Klaeveman
- Christy Larsen
- Cindy Lawton
- Marla Looper
- Leslie Malerich
- Susan Painter
- Alex Powers
- Makenna Reed
- Toni Robinette
- Kathryn Sandercock
- Sydney Sherrill
- Jan Sikes
- Makenna Sturgis
- Brandi Stuart
- Isa Torres
- Jessica van der Linden
- Elisa Vasquez
- Lacey Waldrop
- Jessie Warren
- Shamalene Wilson
- Veronica Wootson

=== Retired jerseys ===
Retired jersey numbers
Name	Position	Career	Number
Darby Cottle	SS	1979–82	15
Jessica van der Linden	P	2001–04	99
Lacey Waldrop	P	2012–15	13

== See also ==
- Florida State Seminoles
- Florida State Seminoles baseball
- History of Florida State University
- List of Florida State University professional athletes
