= 2019 Atlantic Coast Conference softball tournament =

Sport tournament

- Teams: 10
- Format: Single-elimination tournament
- Finals site: JoAnne Graf Field; Tallahassee, Florida
- Champions: Florida State (17th title)
- Runner-up: North Carolina (6th title game)
- Winning coach: Lonni Alameda (7th title)
- MVP: Meghan King (Florida State)
- Television: RSN; ESPN

2019 Atlantic Coast Conference softball standings
	Conf.				Overall
Team	W		L	PCT	W		L	PCT
Atlantic
No. 9 Florida State ^{x}‍‍‡‍^{y}	19	–	5	.792	55	–	10	.846
Notre Dame ‍‍‍^{y}	18	–	6	.750	37	–	18	.673
Louisville ‍‍‍^{y}	12	–	12	.500	35	–	22	.614
NC State ‍‍‍	9	–	15	.375	31	–	27	.534
Syracuse ‍‍‍	8	–	16	.333	20	–	32	.385
Boston College ‍‍‍	4	–	20	.167	17	–	35	.327
Coastal
No. 23 Virginia Tech ^{x}‍†‍‍^{y}	20	–	4	.833	47	–	11	.810
North Carolina ‍‍‍^{y}	17	–	7	.708	37	–	20	.649
Duke ‍‍‍	11	–	13	.458	25	–	31	.446
Georgia Tech ‍‍‍	11	–	13	.458	31	–	27	.534
Virginia ‍‍‍	8	–	16	.333	22	–	31	.415
Pittsburgh ‍‍‍	7	–	17	.292	13	–	40	.245
x – Division champion † – Conference champion ‡ – Tournament champion y – Invited to the NCAA tournament As of June 13, 2019; Rankings from NFCA

The 2019 Atlantic Coast Conference (ACC) Softball Tournament was held at JoAnne Graf Field on the campus of Florida State University in Tallahassee, Florida, May 8 through May 11, 2019.

This was the second year of a 10-team tournament. The 1st Round, quarterfinals and semifinals was shown on the ACC RSN's with a simulcast on ACC Extra. The championship game was broadcast by ESPN.

== Tournament ==
1st Round; May 8 ACC RSN
8	NC State	4
9	Syracuse	3
7	Georgia Tech	8
10	Virginia	0

Quarterfinals; May 9 ACC RSN
1	Virginia Tech	2
8	NC State	3
4	North Carolina	9
5	Louisville	3
3	Notre Dame	9
6	Duke	2
2	Florida State	7
7	Georgia Tech	0

Semifinals; May 10; ACC RSN
8	NC State	1
4	North Carolina	6
3	Notre Dame	0
2	Florida State	2

Championship; May 11; ESPN
4	North Carolina	0
2	Florida State	8^{(6)}

- Only the top 10 have participated in the tournament.
- All times listed are Eastern Daylight Time.

== Schedule ==
Game	Time*	Matchup^{#}	Television	TV Announcers	Attendance
First Round – Wednesday, May 8
1	1:00 p.m.	#8 NC State vs. #10 Syracuse	Regional Sports Network		
2	3:30 p.m.	#7 Georgia Tech vs. #10 Virginia	Regional Sports Network		
Quarterfinals – Thursday, May 9
3	11:00 a.m.	#1 Virginia Tech vs. #8 NC State	Regional Sports Network		
4	1:30 p.m.	#4 North Carolina vs. #5 Louisville	Regional Sports Network		
5	5:00 p.m.	#2 Florida State vs. #7 Georgia Tech	Regional Sports Network		
6	7:30 p.m.	#3 Notre Dame vs. #6 Duke	Regional Sports Network		
Semifinals – Friday, May 10
7	1:00 p.m.	#4 North Carolina vs. #8 NC State	Regional Sports Network		
8	3:30 p.m.	#2 Florida State vs. #3 Notre Dame	Regional Sports Network		
Championship – Saturday, May 11
9	12:00 p.m.	#4 North Carolina vs. #2 Florida State	ESPN		
*Game times in EDT. # – Rankings denote tournament seed.
