= 2018 Atlantic Coast Conference softball tournament =

- Teams: 10
- Format: Single-elimination tournament
- Finals site: Shirley Clements Mewborn Field; Atlanta, Georgia
- Champions: Florida State (16th title)
- Runner-up: Pittsburgh (2nd title game)
- Winning coach: Lonni Alameda (6th title)
- MVP: Sydney Sherrill (Florida State)
- Television: RSN; ESPN

2018 Atlantic Coast Conference softball standings
	Conf.						Overall
Team	W		L		T	PCT	W		L		T	PCT
Atlantic
No. 1 Florida State ^{x}‍‍‡‍^{y}	21	–	3	–	0	.875	58	–	12	–	0	.829
Notre Dame ‍‍‍^{y}	13	–	10	–	0	.565	34	–	23	–	0	.596
Boston College ‍‍‍	13	–	10	–	0	.565	30	–	23	–	0	.566
Louisville ‍‍‍	10	–	12	–	0	.455	33	–	20	–	0	.623
Syracuse ‍‍‍	9	–	12	–	0	.429	30	–	20	–	0	.600
NC State ‍‍‍	5	–	18	–	0	.217	23	–	31	–	0	.426
Coastal
Pittsburgh ^{x}‍‍‍	16	–	6	–	0	.727	33	–	18	–	1	.644
North Carolina ‍‍‍	15	–	8	–	0	.652	30	–	26	–	0	.536
Georgia Tech ‍‍‍	13	–	11	–	0	.542	28	–	26	–	0	.519
Duke ‍‍‍	13	–	11	–	0	.542	29	–	27	–	0	.518
Virginia Tech ‍‍‍	7	–	16	–	0	.304	23	–	30	–	0	.434
Virginia ‍‍‍	3	–	21	–	0	.125	12	–	41	–	0	.226
x – Division champion † – Conference champion ‡ – Tournament champion y – Invited to the NCAA tournament As of June 13, 2018; Rankings from NFCA/USA Today

The 2018 Atlantic Coast Conference (ACC) Softball tournament was held at Shirley Clements Mewborn Field on the campus of Georgia Tech in Atlanta, Georgia from May 9 through May 12, 2018.

This was the first year of a 10-team tournament. The 1st Round, quarterfinals and semifinals were shown on the ACC RSN's with a simulcast on ACC Extra. The championship game was broadcast by ESPN.

== Tournament ==
1st Round; May 9 ACC RSN
8	Louisville	2
9	Syracuse	1
7	Duke	0
10	Virginia Tech	4

Quarterfinals; May 10; ACC RSN
1	Florida State	7
8	Louisville	4
4	Boston College	1
5	Notre Dame	6
3	North Carolina	6
6	Georgia Tech	1
2	Pittsburgh	6
10	Virginia Tech	4

Semifinals; May 11; ACC RSN
1	Florida State	6
5	Notre Dame	1
3	North Carolina	0
2	Pittsburgh	3

Championship; May 12; ESPN
1	Florida State	5
2	Pittsburgh	4

- All times listed are Eastern Daylight Time.

== Broadcasters ==
- Tom Werme & Cheri Kempf (Wed, Early Thurs, Fri)
- Tom Werme & Barbara Jordan (Thurs Evening)
- Pam Ward & Cheri Kempf (Sat)
