= 2015 ACC tournament =

2015 ACC tournament may refer to:

- 2015 ACC men's basketball tournament
- 2015 ACC women's basketball tournament
- 2015 ACC men's soccer tournament
- 2015 ACC women's soccer tournament
- 2015 Atlantic Coast Conference baseball tournament
- 2015 Atlantic Coast Conference softball tournament
