= 2016 Atlantic Coast Conference softball tournament =

- Teams: 8
- Format: Single-elimination tournament
- Finals site: Dail Softball Stadium; Raleigh, North Carolina
- Champions: Florida State (14th title)
- Runner-up: Notre Dame (2nd title game)
- Winning coach: Lonni Alameda (4th title)
- MVP: Jessica Warren (Florida State)
- Television: RSN; ESPN3; ESPN

The 2016 Atlantic Coast Conference (ACC) softball tournament was held at Dail Softball Stadium on the campus of North Carolina State University in Raleigh, North Carolina, from May 12 through May 14, 2016. The quarterfinals and semifinals were shown on the ACC RSN's with a simulcast on ESPN3. The championship game was broadcast by ESPN.

== Tournament ==
Quarterfinals
1	Florida State	8
8	Pitt	0^{(6)}
4	Boston College	0
5	North Carolina	6
2	Louisville	1
7	Syracuse	0
3	Notre Dame	5
6	Virginia Tech	4

Semifinals
1	Florida State	7
5	North Carolina	1
2	Louisville	2
3	Notre Dame	4

Finals
1	Florida State	7
3	Notre Dame	3

- All times listed are Eastern Daylight Time.

== Broadcasters ==
- Tom Werme & Cheri Kempf (ACC RSN- Early; Thurs)
- Tom Werme & Barbara Jordan (ACC RSN-Late; Thurs)
- Tom Werme, Cheri Kempf, & Barbara Jordan (ACC RSN- Fri)
- Pam Ward & Cheri Kempf (ESPN)
