= 2019 ACC tournament =

2019 ACC tournament may refer to:

- 2019 ACC men's basketball tournament
- 2019 ACC women's basketball tournament
- 2019 ACC men's soccer tournament
- 2019 ACC women's soccer tournament
- 2019 Atlantic Coast Conference baseball tournament
- 2019 Atlantic Coast Conference softball tournament
