= 2018 ACC tournament =

2018 ACC tournament may refer to:

- 2018 ACC men's basketball tournament
- 2018 ACC women's basketball tournament
- 2018 ACC men's soccer tournament
- 2018 ACC women's soccer tournament
- 2018 Atlantic Coast Conference baseball tournament
- 2018 Atlantic Coast Conference softball tournament
