= Holly Aprile =

American softball coach

Current position
- Title: Head coach
- Team: Louisville
- Conference: ACC
- Record: 226–170–1 (.571)

Biographical details
- Born: Pompton Plains, New Jersey, U.S.
- Education: UMass

Playing career
- 1989–1992: UMass

Coaching career (HC unless noted)
- 1993–1995: Eastern Illinois (Graduate asst.)
- 1995–2004: South Carolina (asst.)
- 2004–2008: Pittsburgh (asst.)
- 2009–2018: Pittsburgh
- 2019–present: Louisville

Head coaching record
- Overall: 460–385–1 (.544)
- Tournaments: NCAA: 4–4 (.500)

Accomplishments and honors

Championships
- ACC Coastal Division Champions (2018)

Awards
- As player: Atlantic 10 Rookie of the Year (1989); 2× Atlantic 10 Player of the Year (1990, 1991); Atlantic 10 Pitcher of the Year (1992); As head coach: ACC Coach of the Year (2018); NFCA Mid-Atlantic Region Coaching Staff of the Year (2015)

Holly Aprile (born December 23, 1969) is an American softball pitcher, former collegiate All-American, and current head coach for Louisville. She played college softball at the utility position for the UMass Minutewomen from 1989 to 1992 in the Atlantic 10 Conference, where she was eventually named Newcomer of the Year, Player of the Year and Pitcher of the Year over her career, in addition to being recognized as a four-time All-Conference honoree. She also led the team to their first appearance at the 1992 Women's College World Series, finishing in the semifinals. Aprile is also a UMass Hall of Fame inductee.

== Coaching career ==
=== Louisville ===
On July 8, 2018, Holly Aprile was announced as the new head coach of the Louisville softball program.

== Career statistics ==
UMass Minutewomen
YEAR	W	L	GP	GS	CG	SHO	SV	IP	H	R	ER	BB	SO	ERA	WHIP
1989	22	11	39	29	21	12	2	206.0	122	59	35	59	113	1.19	0.88
1990	19	11	33	26	22	6	0	188.2	133	79	51	89	131	1.89	1.18
1991	18	7	26	23	19	7	2	167.2	107	45	31	48	97	1.30	0.92
1992	18	4	26	23	21	8	0	153.2	116	49	27	47	68	1.23	1.06
TOTALS	77	33	124	101	83	33	4	716.0	478	232	144	243	409	1.41	1.00

UMass Minutewomen
YEAR	G	AB	R	H	BA	RBI	HR	3B	2B	TB	SLG	BB	SO	SB	SBA
1989	53	172	23	45	.261	18	2	3	4	55	.320%	3	27	5	5
1990	46	155	32	63	.406	18	1	8	11	93	.600%	2	14	6	6
1991	51	164	38	64	.390	38	2	4	19	97	.591%	8	17	5	6
1992	53	191	39	63	.339	19	2	6	9	120	.656%	6	13	8	8
TOTALS	203	682	132	235	.344	93	7	21	43	341	.500%	19	71	24	25

== Head coaching record ==
=== College ===
Record table
Season	Team	Overall	Conference	Standing	Postseason
Pittsburgh Panthers (Big East Conference) (2009–2013)
2009	Pittsburgh	25–24	9–15	10th	
2010	Pittsburgh	27–25	10–11	6th	
2011	Pittsburgh	34–17	13–8	6th	
2012	Pittsburgh	26–26	8–14	9th	
2013	Pittsburgh	19–29	8–14	11th	
Pittsburgh Panthers (Atlantic Coast Conference) (2014–2018)
2014	Pittsburgh	15–29	6–18	10th	
2015	Pittsburgh	37–22	11–13	6th	NCAA Regional
2016	Pittsburgh	31–21	8–14	8th	
2017	Pittsburgh	24–23	7–17	10th	
2018	Pittsburgh	33–18–1	16–6	1st (Coastal)	
Pittsburgh:		271–234 (.537)	96–130 (.425)		
Louisville Cardinals (Atlantic Coast Conference) (2019–Present)
2019	Louisville	35–22	12–12	3rd (Atlantic)	NCAA Regional
2020	Louisville	10–13	0–0	T-11th	Season canceled due to COVID-19
2021	Louisville	28–21–1	15–21–1	6th	
2022	Louisville	27–25	10–14	8th	
2023	Louisville	36–20	16–7	4th	NCAA Regional
2024	Louisville	27–25	8–16	11th	
2025	Louisville	26–25	9–15	10th	
2026	Louisville	44–11	18–6	T-3rd	NCAA Regional
Louisville:		226–170–1 (.571)	88–91 (.492)		
Total:		497–404–1 (.552)			
National champion Postseason invitational champion Conference regular season champion Conference regular season and conference tournament champion Division regular season champion Division regular season and conference tournament champion Conference tournament champion
