= ACC Tournament (disambiguation) =

ACC Tournament may refer to:

- ACC men's basketball tournament, founded 1954
- ACC women's basketball tournament, founded 1978
- ACC men's soccer tournament, founded 1987
- ACC women's soccer tournament, founded 1988
- Atlantic Coast Conference baseball tournament, founded 1973
- Atlantic Coast Conference softball tournament, founded 1992
