= 2016 ACC tournament =

2016 ACC tournament may refer to:

- 2016 ACC men's basketball tournament
- 2016 ACC women's basketball tournament
- 2016 ACC men's soccer tournament
- 2016 ACC women's soccer tournament
- 2016 Atlantic Coast Conference baseball tournament
- 2016 Atlantic Coast Conference softball tournament
