= 2015 Atlantic Coast Conference softball tournament =

- Teams: 8
- Format: Single-elimination tournament
- Finals site: Tech Softball Complex; Blacksburg, Virginia
- Champions: Florida State (13th title)
- Runner-up: Pittsburgh (1st title game)
- Winning coach: Lonni Alameda (3rd title)
- MVP: Jessica Burroughs (Florida State)
- Television: RSN; ESPN3; ESPN

The 2015 Atlantic Coast Conference (ACC) softball tournament was held at the Tech Softball Complex on the campus of Virginia Tech in Blacksburg, Virginia from May 7 through May 9, 2015. Top seeded Florida State won the tournament, beating the Pitt Panthers, and thus earned the Atlantic Coast Conference's automatic bid to the 2015 NCAA Division I softball tournament. The quarterfinals and semifinals were shown on the ACC RSN's with a simulcast on ESPN3. The championship game was broadcast by ESPN.

== Tournament ==
Quarterfinals
1	Florida State	4
8	Boston College	2
4	Louisville	2
5	NC State	3
2	North Carolina	3
7	Virginia Tech	2
3	Notre Dame	1
6	Pitt	8

Semifinals
1	Florida State	11
5	NC State	4
2	North Carolina	0
6	Pitt	4

Finals
1	Florida State	6
6	Pitt	2

- All times listed are Eastern Daylight Time.
