= Jessica van der Linden =

American softball player

Jessica van der Linden is a former college softball pitcher for the Florida State Seminoles. In 2004, she won the USA Softball Collegiate Player of the Year and Honda Sports Award for softball.
