= Robert E. Taylor Stadium =

Softball stadium on the University of Maryland campus

Taylor Stadium
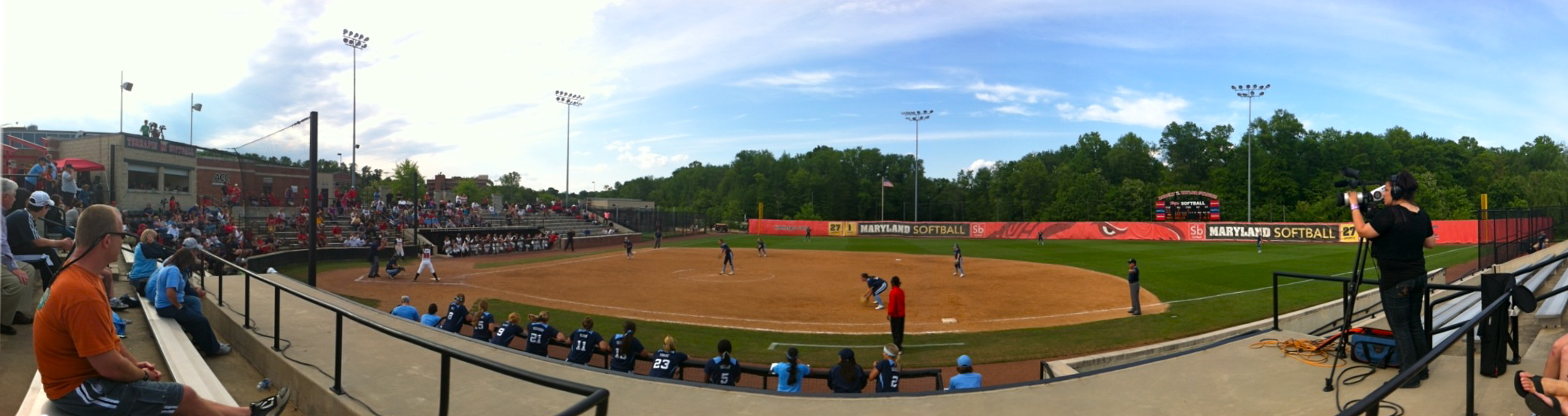
- Interactive map of Taylor Stadium
- Full name: Robert E. Taylor Stadium
- Location: Comcast Center Terrapin Trail, College Park, MD, 20742, United States
- Coordinates: 38°59′46.6″N 76°56′22.6″W
- Owner: University of Maryland
- Operator: University of Maryland Athletics
- Capacity: Over 1000
- Surface: Natural Bermuda grass
- Scoreboard: Electronic scoreboard

Construction
- Groundbreaking: 2001
- Opened: 2002
- Cost: $3 million

Tenants
- Maryland Terrapins softball (NCAA); 2002–present

Robert E. Taylor Stadium is a softball stadium located in College Park, Maryland on the campus of the University of Maryland. The stadium broke ground in 2001 and opened in April 2002.

== History ==
The softball team at the University of Maryland had been playing at an off campus softball complex ever since the programs inception in 1995. A new on-campus stadium and complex was in high demand to reward the young softball program which had risen to 12th in the national softball rankings in just its third season. Ground was broken in August 2001 to begin construction on the softball stadium. The construction coincided with the construction of the Comcast Center (now the Xfinity Center), the new arena for the men and women's basketball programs, which had begun construction a year earlier and was being built right next to the softball complex.

Robert E. Taylor Stadium opened April 10, 2002. The inaugural game pitted the Terrapins against in-state rival Towson. The first game in the stadium saw a no-hitter thrown by Maryland's Amanda Becker who struck out 7 Towson Tigers en route to her first no-hitter and a Maryland win.

During the 2010 season the Stadium hosted its first ever regional as the Terrapins played host to Oklahoma, Fordham, and Syracuse. They hosted a regional again in the NCAA softball tournament in 2011.

== Features ==
Robert E. Taylor Stadium has light towers for night games, two bullpens, four batting cages, a press box area, a concession area and several other amenities. Softball players are able to easily access the weight room and academic support located within the nearby Xfinity Center. Many other of the university's athletic facilities also surround the softball stadium. Located directly south is an artificial turf field that is used for practice by men's lacrosse, women's lacrosse, men's soccer, and women's soccer. To the east of the softball stadium is the field hockey field where the field hockey team plays.
