= JoAnne Graf =

American softball coach

Biographical details
- Education: BS.c, PhD, Florida State University; M.S., 1978, University of North Carolina at Greensboro

Coaching career (HC unless noted)
- 1976-1978 (AC): UNC Greensboro Spartans softball
- 1979-2008: Florida State Seminoles softball

Head coaching record
- Overall: 1,437-478-6

Accomplishments and honors

Awards
- ACC Coach of the Year

JoAnne Graf is an American former softball coach and Associate Professor in Sport Management at Florida State University. As coach of the Florida State Seminoles women's softball team from 1979 to 2008, she logged more wins than any coach in the history of NCAA Division I softball. On April 2, 2005, Florida State University renamed their softball stadium in her honor as the JoAnne Graf Field at the Seminole Softball Complex.

== Education ==
Graf earned her Bachelor degree from Florida State University (FSU) in 1975. While earning her master's degree from the University of North Carolina at Greensboro in 1978, she spent two years as the assistant softball coach for the Greensboro Spartans. She completed her PhD at FSU in 1992.

== Seminoles coaching career ==
Graf returned to Florida State University in 1979 to coach the Florida State Seminoles women's softball team. She recorded her first win on February 26, 1979 against Chipola College. Over her 30-year coaching career at Florida State from 1979 to 2008, she led the team to 7 College World Series Games, 17 NCAA tournaments, and 10 Atlantic Coast Conference titles. From 1995 until 2000, she coached the Seminoles to a record breaking six straight ACC Championship titles. By 2001, she had the most wins of any active coach in Division I softball and was awarded the Florida State Alumni Association Circle of Gold Award.

On February 18, 2004, she became the second Division I coach, and third overall, to reach 1,000 wins. In honor of her achievements, Florida State University renamed the softball stadium JoAnne Graf Field at the Seminole Softball Complex on April 2, 2005. In April 2006, she became the second NCAA Division 1 coach to reach 1,110 wins.

By the time Graf retired in 2008, she had logged more wins than any other coach in the history of Division I softball, with a record of 1,437 wins. Her team had averaged 48 wins per year and produced 25 All-America players, which also earned her six ACC coach of the year awards.

In 2013, she was inducted into Florida State University's Hall of Fame. In 2018, she was honored by Florida State University as a distinguished alumna.
