= Isa Torres =

American softball player

Texas Longhorns
- Shortstop
- Born: September 16, 2004 (age 21); Georgetown, Texas

Teams
- Florida State (2024–2026); Texas (2026–present)

Career highlights and awards
- Softball America Defensive Player of the Year (2026); ACC Player of the Year (2026); ACC Defensive Player of the Year (2026); 2× NFCA First Team All-American (2025, 2026); 2× First team All-ACC (2025, 2026); Second team All-ACC (2024)

Isabella Torres is an American college softball player for Texas Longhorns.

== High school career ==
Torres attended Georgetown High School in Georgetown, Texas. In 2021, she was named to the 5A All-State Team and was named the All-District Offensive Player of the Year. In 2022 she was named the All-Central Texas Defensive Player of the Year and was named to the Texas State All-Tournament Team. In 2023 she recorded 64 hits, with a .577 batting averaged, and .628 on-base percentage while striking out only twice in 156 plate appearances. Following the season she was named Central Texas softball player of the year by the Austin American-Statesman. She was ranked ninth by Extra Innings Softball in the class of 2023 rankings.

== College career ==
Torres originally committed to play college softball at Texas A&M, to play alongside her older sister, Mariana. However, she decommitted when Mariana transferred to McNeese.

During her freshman year in 2024, she started 61 games at shortstop and finished the season with a .356 batting average, along with nine home runs and 57 RBIs. During her sophomore year in 2025, she broke the single-season school record with a .436 batting averaged and had the third-most hits in school history with 95. She also scored the fifth-most runs in school history with 70. She finished the season with nine home runs and 45 RBIs.

During her junior year in 2026, she appeared in 54 games and recorded 16 home runs, 21 doubles, seven triples, 78 runs scored, 56 RBIs, along with a .530 batting average. On March 6, 2026, against Coastal Carolina, she set a program record for hits in a game. She went a perfect 6-for-6 and became the first NCAA Division I player to achieve six hits in a seven-inning game since 2017. On March 20, 2026, she became the first player in NCAA history to record 14 hits in 14 consecutive at-bats. She extended the record to 16 hits in 16 consecutive at-bats. She reached base safely in 23 consecutive plate appearances, a Florida State record and the third-longest streak in NCAA history.

During conference play she hit .475 with 10 home runs, 38 runs and 24 RBIs. She ranked in the top five of the league leaders in batting average, slugging percentage (1.013), on-base percentage (0.571), runs scored (38), hits (38), triples (3) and home runs (10). At the end of the regular season, she ranked third in the nation in overall batting average (.547), fourth in on-base percentage (0.608) and fourth in runs per game (1.50). Defensively, she recorded a perfect 1.000 fielding percentage, along with 27 putouts and 50 assists with zero errors. Following an outstanding season she was named the ACC Player of the Year and ACC Defensive Player of the Year. She was also named the Softball America Defensive Player of the Year and a top-three finalist for the USA Softball Collegiate Player of the Year.
