= Louisville Cardinals softball =

- Founded: 2000
- University: University of Louisville
- Head coach: Holly Aprile (8th season)
- Conference: ACC
- Location: Louisville, Kentucky, US
- Home stadium: Ulmer Stadium (capacity: 2500)
- Nickname: Cardinals
- Colors: Red and black

NCAA Tournament appearances
- 2004, 2005, 2006, 2007, 2008, 2009, 2010, 2011, 2012, 2013, 2014, 2015, 2016, 2019, 2023, 2026

Conference tournament championships
- Big East; 2007, 2012 AAC; 2014

Regular-season conference championships
- C-USA; 2005 Big East; 2006, 2012

The Louisville Cardinals softball team represents University of Louisville in NCAA Division I college softball. The team participates in the Atlantic Coast Conference. The Cardinals are currently led by head coach Holly Aprile. The team plays its home games at Ulmer Stadium located on the university's campus.

== History ==
=== Coaching history ===
Years	Coach	Record	%
2000–2018	Sandy Pearsall	718–369	.661
2019–Present	Holly Aprile	226–170–1	.571

== Louisville in the NCAA Tournament ==
Year	Record	Pct	Notes
2004	1–2	.333	Los Angeles Regional
2005	1–2	.333	Notre Dame Regional
2006	2–2	.500	Knoxville Regional
2007	1–2	.333	Ann Arbor Regional
2008	1–2	.333	Knoxville Regional
2009	1–2	.333	Hosted Louisville Regional
2010	2–2	.500	Knoxville Regional
2011	2–2	.500	Hosted Louisville Regional
2012	2–2	.500	Hosted Louisville Regional
2013	1–2	.333	Hosted Louisville Regional
2014	0–2	.000	Tucson Regional
2015	0–2	.000	Columbia Regional
2016	0–2	.000	Columbia Regional
2019	2–2	.500	Evanston Regional
2023	1–2	.333	Knoxville Regional
2026	0–0	–	Lincoln Regional
TOTALS	17–30	.362	

== Championships ==
=== Conference Championships ===
Season	Conference	Record	Head coach
2005	Conference USA	20-4	Sandy Pearsall
2006	Big East Conference	19-3	Sandy Pearsall
2012	Big East Conference	20-2	Sandy Pearsall

=== Conference Tournament Championships ===
Year	Conference	Tournament Location	Head coach
2007	Big East Conference	South Bend, IN	Sandy Pearsall
2012	Big East Conference	Notre Dame, IN	Sandy Pearsall
2014	American Athletic Conference	Houston, TX	Sandy Pearsall

== Coaching staff ==
Name	Position coached	Consecutive season at Louisville in current position
Holly Aprile	Head coach	8th
Griffin Joiner	Assistant coach	8th
Bryan Sabatella	Assistant coach	3rd
DeeDee Morris	Director of Operations	3rd
Jeremy Randolph	Director of Softball Operations	3rd

== Season-by-season results ==
Record table
Season	Coach	Overall	Conference	Standing	Postseason
Sandy Pearsall (CUSA) (2000–2005)
2000	Sandy Pearsall	36–26	8–8		
2001	Sandy Pearsall	40–26	12–9		
2002	Sandy Pearsall	27–28	11–10	4th	
2003	Sandy Pearsall	24–26	12–11		
2004	Sandy Pearsall	41–19	19–5		NCAA Regional
2005	Sandy Pearsall	43–20	20–4		NCAA Regional
Sandy Pearsall (Big East) (2006–2013)
2006	Sandy Pearsall	45–11	19–3	1st	NCAA Regional
2007	Sandy Pearsall	37–25	14–6	3rd	NCAA Regional
2008	Sandy Pearsall	31–23	12–8		NCAA Regional
2009	Sandy Pearsall	48–11	19–5	3rd	NCAA Regional
2010	Sandy Pearsall	41–19	16–6	3rd	NCAA Regional
2011	Sandy Pearsall	38–20	12–7		NCAA Regional
2012	Sandy Pearsall	55–5	20–2	1st	NCAA Regional
2013	Sandy Pearsall	47–13	18–4	3rd	NCAA Regional
Sandy Pearsall (AAC) (2014–2014)
2014	Sandy Pearsall	36–22	14–7	3rd	NCAA Regional
Sandy Pearsall (ACC) (2015–2018)
2015	Sandy Pearsall	30–19	16–7	4th	NCAA Regional
2016	Sandy Pearsall	35–17	15–8	2nd	NCAA Regional
2017	Sandy Pearsall	31–19	14–8	4th	
2018	Sandy Pearsall	33–20	10–12	8th	
Sandy Pearsall:		718–369 (.661)	281–130(.684)		
Holly Aprile (ACC) (2019–present)
2019	Holly Aprile	35–23	12–12	5th	NCAA Regional
2020	Holly Aprile	10–13			Season canceled due to COVID-19
2021	Holly Aprile	21–28–1	15–21–1	6th	
2022	Holly Aprile	27–25	10–14	8th	
2023	Holly Aprile	36–20	16–7	4th	NCAA Regional
2024	Holly Aprile	27–25	8–16	11th	
2025	Holly Aprile	26–25	9–15	10th	
2026	Holly Aprile	44–11	18–6	T-3rd	NCAA Regional
Holly Aprile:		226–170–1 (.571)	88–91–1 (.492)		
Total:		944–539–1 (.636)	369–221–1 (.625)		
National champion Postseason invitational champion Conference regular season champion Conference regular season and conference tournament champion Division regular season champion Division regular season and conference tournament champion Conference tournament champion

== Awards and honors ==
=== Conference awards and honors ===
==== Conference USA Player of the Year ====
- Courtney Moore, 2005

==== Conference USA Freshman of the Year ====
- Audrey Rendon, 2004

==== Big East Player of the Year ====
- Melissa Roth, 2009
- Chelsea Bemis, 2010

==== Big East Pitcher of the Year ====
- Catherine Bishop, 2006
