= 1983 National Collegiate slow-pitch softball championship =

The 1983 National Collegiate women's slow-pitch softball championship was held in Graham, North Carolina, near Raleigh, on May 5–7. This was the first year after the demise of the AIAW, which had conducted the previous two national title tournaments in 1981 and 1982. The Amateur Softball Association stepped in to fill the void by organizing the 1983 tournament and another in 1984. Those four years were the only time that major college slow-pitch teams competed for national collegiate titles, although small NAIA schools and junior colleges also conducted their own slow-pitch championships into the 1990s. The AIAW had lost its struggle with the NCAA, which vanquished the women's collegiate athletic organization after a year of dual crowning of champions in women's sports. Although the NCAA began sponsoring fast-pitch softball in 1982, it opted not to organize slow-pitch.

== Teams ==
The double-elimination tournament included 13 teams, with the top five seeded in the order shown:

1. Florida
2. Florida State
3. East Carolina
4. South Florida
5. Northern Kentucky

- Capital University (Ohio)
- Cleveland State
- Georgia Southern
- Mississippi University for Women
- North Carolina A&T
- North Carolina–Charlotte
- West Florida
- Western Carolina

Fourth-seeded South Florida fought through the losers' bracket after losing its third game. South Florida won five in a row after that, including two wins in the final against two-time defending champion Florida State. The final if-necessary game went an extra inning to end in a 4-3 South Florida win, giving the team a 7-1 record in the tournament. Ellen Peterson of South Florida was named the Most Valuable Player of the tournament. This was to be the last slow-pitch game ever played by the Florida State Lady Seminoles, who switched to fast-pitch the following year. South Florida successfully defended its championship in 1984.

== Bracket ==
Upper round 1	Upper round 2	Upper round 3	Upper final	Final
Florida	4
Western Carolina	3
Georgia Southern	0
Western Carolina	4
Florida	W
South Florida	L
South Florida	W
North Carolina A&T	L
South Florida	8
North Carolina–Charlotte	1
Capital University	0
North Carolina–Charlotte	12
Florida	3
Florida State	8
East Carolina	W
West Florida	L
West Florida	5
Cleveland State	4
East Carolina	2
Florida State	3
Florida State	13	Florida State	2	3
Northern Kentucky	4	South Florida	11	4 (Note: 8 innings)
Mississippi University for Women	L
Northern Kentucky	W
Lower round 1	Lower round 2	Lower round 3	Lower round 4	Lower round 5	Lower final
Western Carolina	10
Western Carolina	3
Mississippi University for Women	0
Western Carolina	2	East Carolina	4
North Carolina–Charlotte	0	South Florida	5
North Carolina–Charlotte	4
East Carolina	1	Florida	3
Cleveland State	1
South Florida	8
West Florida or Northern Kentucky	?
(?)	L
North Carolina A&T	?	winner of North Carolina A&T vs Capital University	?
(?)	?	South Florida	W
Capital University	?
(?)	?
Northern Kentucky or West Florida	?
Georgia Southern	?

== Ranking ==
Place	School	WCWS Record
1st	South Florida	7-1
2nd	Florida State	3-2
3rd	Florida	2-2
4th	East Carolina	2-2
5th	Western Carolina	3-2
5th	(?)	2-2 or 3-2
7th	North Carolina–Charlotte	2-2
7th	(?)	2-2 or 1-2
9th	(?)	1-2
9th	(?)	1-2 or 0-2
11th	loser of (North Carolina A&T/Capital)	0-2
11th	Cleveland State	0-2
11th	Mississippi University for Women	0-2

The placings of Capital University, Georgia Southern, North Carolina A&T, Northern Kentucky and West Florida depend on the game results that have not been retrieved.
