= Lonni Alameda =

American softball coach

Current position
- Title: Head coach
- Team: Florida State
- Conference: ACC
- Record: 863–236–2 (.785)

Biographical details
- Born: June 11, 1970 (age 56); El Dorado Hills, California, U.S.

Playing career
- 1989: St. Mary's (TX)
- 1990–1992: Oklahoma
- Positions: Infielder, pitcher

Coaching career (HC unless noted)
- 1994–1995: Barry (asst.)
- 1996–2003: Stanford (asst.)
- 2004–2008: UNLV
- 2009–present: Florida State
- 2016–2017: USSSA Pride

Head coaching record
- Overall: College: 1020–394–2 (.721); NPF: 97–22 (.815)
- Tournaments: ACC: 42–7 (.857); NCAA: 63–36 (.636); NPF: 6–4 (.600)

Accomplishments and honors

Championships
- Women's College World Series (2018); 9× ACC regular season (2013, 2014, 2015, 2016, 2017, 2018, 2023, 2025, 2026); 10× ACC tournament (2011, 2014, 2015, 2016, 2017, 2018, 2019, 2022, 2023, 2026)

Awards
- 8× ACC Coach of the Year (2013, 2014, 2015, 2016, 2017, 2023, 2025, 2026); 2× MWC Coach of the Year (2005, 2007); NFCA West Region Coach of the Year (2005)

Alana Maree "Lonni" Alameda (born June 11, 1970) is an American softball coach who is the current head coach at Florida State. She has been head coach at Florida State since 2009, in addition to the USSSA Pride of National Pro Fastpitch from 2016 to 2017. Alameda is also currently an assistant coach for Team Canada.

== Early life and education ==
Alameda graduated from Oak Ridge High School in El Dorado Hills, California in 1988. After pitching at St. Mary's University, Texas in the 1989 season, during which St. Mary's made the NAIA Tournament, Alameda transferred to Oklahoma and went on to earn two second-team All-Big Eight awards on the softball team in addition to playing volleyball. Alameda graduated from Oklahoma with a communications degree in 1992 and played professional softball in the Netherlands in 1993.

== Coaching career ==
=== College assistant (1994–2003) ===
In 1994 and 1995, Alameda was an assistant coach at Division II Barry University. From 1996 to 2003, Alameda was an assistant coach at Stanford under Sandy Pearce in 1996 and John Rittman beginning in 1997, during which Stanford went 320–179–1 and made six straight NCAA Tournaments.

=== UNLV (2004–2008) ===
After going 25–35 in her first season as head coach of UNLV in 2004, Alameda led UNLV to a historically best 44–19 record in 2005 and first NCAA Tournament appearance in nine years, for which Alameda earned Mountain West Conference (MWC) Coach of the Year honors. UNLV went 26–37 in 2006 but improved to 37–27 in 2007, Alameda's second time as MWC Coach of the Year. The 2008 UNLV team began with a 9–1–1 record and the first top-25 ranking in program history, but injuries to four starters caused the team to finish 25–40–1.

=== Florida State (2009–present) ===
Alameda debuted at Florida State in 2009 with a 44–19 record and NCAA Regional appearance. She led the Seminoles to the national title in 2018.

== Head coaching record ==
=== College ===
Record table
| Season | Team | Overall | Conference | Standing | Postseason |
|---|---|---|---|---|---|
UNLV Rebels (Mountain West Conference) (2004–2008)
| 2004 | UNLV | 25–35 | 7–13 | 5th | |
| 2005 | UNLV | 44–19 | 17–3 | 2nd | NCAA Regionals |
| 2006 | UNLV | 26–37 | 8–12 | 4th | |
| 2007 | UNLV | 37–27 | 12–8 | 2nd | |
| 2008 | UNLV | 25–40–1 | 5–15 | 6th | |
| UNLV: | | 157–158–1 (.498) | 49–51 (.490) | | |
Florida State Seminoles (Atlantic Coast Conference) (2009–present)
| 2009 | Florida State | 44–16 | 17–4 | 2nd | NCAA Regionals |
| 2010 | Florida State | 44–18 | 12–9 | 3rd | NCAA Regionals |
| 2011 | Florida State | 32–28 | 9–11 | 4th | NCAA Regionals |
| 2012 | Florida State | 47–16 | 16–5 | 2nd | NCAA Regionals |
| 2013 | Florida State | 44–19 | 18–2 | 1st | NCAA Super Regionals |
| 2014 | Florida State | 55–9 | 24–3 | 1st | Women's College World Series |
| 2015 | Florida State | 49–14 | 20–3 | 1st | NCAA Super Regionals |
| 2016 | Florida State | 55–10 | 21–2 | 1st | Women's College World Series |
| 2017 | Florida State | 55–8–1 | 24–0 | 1st | NCAA Super Regionals |
| 2018 | Florida State | 58–12 | 21–3 | 1st | WCWS Champions |
| 2019 | Florida State | 55–10 | 19–5 | 1st (Atlantic) | NCAA Super Regionals |
| 2020 | Florida State | 17–7 | 0–0 | | Season canceled due to COVID-19 |
| 2021 | Florida State | 49–13–1 | 26–5–1 | 2nd | WCWS Runner-Up |
| 2022 | Florida State | 54–7 | 19–5 | 3rd | NCAA Regionals |
| 2023 | Florida State | 58–11 | 22–2 | 1st | WCWS Runner-Up |
| 2024 | Florida State | 46–16 | 19–5 | 2nd | NCAA Super Regionals |
| 2025 | Florida State | 49–12 | 18–3 | 1st | NCAA Super Regionals |
| 2026 | Florida State | 52–10 | 21–3 | 1st | NCAA Regionals |
| Florida State: | | 863–236–2 (.785) | 327–70–1 (.823) | | |
| Total: | | 1020–394–2 (.721) | | | |
National champion Postseason invitational champion Conference regular season champion Conference regular season and conference tournament champion Division regular season champion Division regular season and conference tournament champion Conference tournament champion

=== NPF ===
| Team | Year | Regular season | | | | | Postseason | | | |
| Team | Year | Won | Lost | Ties | Win % | Finish | Won | Lost | Win % | Result |
|---|---|---|---|---|---|---|---|---|---|---|
| USSSA Pride | 2016 | 37 | 13 | 0 | .740 | 1st in NPF | 3 | 2 | .600 | NPF Runners-Up |
| USSSA Pride | 2017 | 40 | 9 | 0 | .816 | 1st in NPF | 3 | 2 | .600 | NPF Runners-Up |
| Total | | 77 | 22 | 0 | .778 | | | | | |
