= Syracuse Orange softball =

Women's College softball team representing Syracuse University, New York

- Founded: 2000
- University: Syracuse University
- Head coach: Shannon Doepking (8th season)
- Conference: ACC
- Location: Syracuse, New York, US
- Home stadium: Skytop Softball Stadium (capacity: 650)
- Nickname: Orange
- Colors: Orange

NCAA Tournament appearances
- 2010, 2011, 2012

Conference tournament championships
- Big East; 2010, 2011 ACC

The Syracuse Orange softball is the team which represents Syracuse University in NCAA Division I softball. The team currently participates in the Atlantic Coast Conference. The Orange are currently led by their head coach Shannon Doepking. The team plays its home games at Skytop Softball Stadium located on the university's campus.

== History ==
=== Coaching history ===
Years	Coach	Record	%
2000–2005	Mary Jo Firnbach	164–169	.492
2006–2015	Leigh Ross	259–219	.542
2016–2018	Mike Bosch	88–65	.575
2019–present	Shannon Doepking	20–32	.385

== Championships ==
=== Conference Tournament Championships ===
Year	Conference	Tournament Location	Head coach
2010	Big East Conference	Louisville, KY	Leigh Ross
2011	Big East Conference	Louisville, KY	Leigh Ross

== Coaching staff ==
Name	Position coached	Consecutive season at Syracuse in current position
Shannon Doepking	Head coach	4th
Evan Ruechel	Assistant coach	2nd
Sydney O’Hara	Assistant coach	1st
Katie McEachern	Assistant coach	1st

== Awards and honors ==
=== Conference Awards and Honors ===
==== Big East Player of the Year ====
- Alexis Switenko, 2006

==== Big East Pitcher of the Year ====
- Jenna Caira, 2011

==== Big East Freshman of the Year ====
- Tanya Rose, 2002
- Erin Downey, 2005
- Tonye McCorkle, 2006
- Jenna Caira, 2009
