= NC State Wolfpack softball =

NCAA Division I softball team

- Founded: 2004; 22 years ago
- University: North Carolina State University
- Head coach: Lindsay Leftwich (1st season)
- Conference: ACC
- Location: Raleigh, North Carolina, US
- Home stadium: Curtis & Jacqueline Dail Softball Stadium
- Nickname: Wolfpack
- Colors: Red and white

NCAA super regional appearances
- 2015

NCAA Tournament appearances
- 2006, 2007, 2013, 2014, 2015

Conference tournament championships
- 2006, 2013

Regular-season conference championships
- 2006

The NC State Wolfpack softball team represents North Carolina State University in NCAA Division I college softball. The team participates in the Atlantic Coast Conference. The Wolfpack are currently led by head coach Lindsay Leftwich. The team plays its home games at Curtis & Jacqueline Dail Softball Stadium located on the university's campus.

== History ==
=== Coaching history ===
Years	Coach	Record	%
2004-2012	Lisa Navas		
2013-2018	Shawn Rychcik		
2019–2023	Jennifer Patrick-Swift	127-116	.523
2023–Present	Lindsay Leftwich	30-23	.566

== Year-by-year results ==
Statistics overview
Season	Team	Overall	Conference	Standing	Postseason
Lisa Navas (Atlantic Coast Conference) (2004–2012)
2004	Lisa Navas	32-27	3-7	5th	
2005	Lisa Navas	41-25	7-7	4th	
2006	Lisa Navas	50-21	14-6	1st	NCAA Regional
2007	Lisa Navas	42-21	15-6	2nd	NCAA Regional
2008	Lisa Navas	31-27	8-13	5th	
2009	Lisa Navas	23-25	5-13	6th	
2010	Lisa Navas	28-27	9-12	5th	
2011	Lisa Navas	26-23	7-12	6th	
2012	Lisa Navas	23-31	5-15	7th	
Lisa Navas:		296–227 (.566)	73–91 (.445)		
Shawn Rychcik (Atlantic Coast Conference) (2013–2018)
2013	Shawn Rychcik	35-20-1	13-7	2nd	NCAA Regional
2014	Shawn Rychcik	36-18	16-8	4th	NCAA Regional
2015	Shawn Rychcik	38-22	13-8	5th	NCAA Super Regional
2016	Shawn Rychcik	23-33	6-18	11th	
2017	Shawn Rychcik	18-38	10-14	7th	
2018	Shawn Rychcik	23-31	5-18	6th (Atlantic)	
Shawn Rychcik:		173–162–1 (.516)	63–73 (.463)		
Jennifer Patrick-Swift (Atlantic Coast Conference) (2019–2023)
2019	Jennifer Patrick-Swift	31-27	9-15	4th (Atlantic)	
2020	Jennifer Patrick-Swift	19-6	3-0	N/A	
2021	Jennifer Patrick-Swift	26-25	15-22	7th	
2022	Jennifer Patrick-Swift	33-23	7-17	10th	
2023	Jennifer Patrick-Swift	18-35	6-18	13th	
Jennifer Patrick-Swift:		127–116 (.523)	40–72 (.357)		
Total:		596–505–1 (.541)			
National champion Postseason invitational champion Conference regular season champion Conference regular season and conference tournament champion Division regular season champion Division regular season and conference tournament champion Conference tournament champion

== Championships ==
=== Conference Championships ===
Season	Conference	Record	Head coach
2006	Atlantic Coast Conference	14-6	Lisa Navas

=== Conference Tournament Championships ===
Year	Conference	Tournament Location	Head coach
2006	Atlantic Coast Conference	Chapel Hill, NC	Lisa Navas
2013	Atlantic Coast Conference	Tallahassee, FL	Shawn Rychcik

see Atlantic Coast Conference softball tournament

== Coaching staff ==
Name	Position coached	Consecutive season at NC State in current position
Lindsay Leftwich	Head coach	2nd
Mike Bosch	Assistant coach	2nd
Paige Cassady	Assistant coach	2nd
Grayson Radcliffe	Assistant coach	2nd
Carson Harris	Director of Operations	3rd
