= Pittsburgh Panthers softball =

- University: University of Pittsburgh
- Head coach: Jenny Allard (3rd season)
- Conference: ACC; Coastal Division
- Location: Pittsburgh, Pennsylvania, US
- Home stadium: Vartabedian Field in the Petersen Sports Complex (capacity: 600)
- Nickname: Panthers
- Colors: Blue and gold

NCAA Tournament appearances
- 2015

Pittsburgh Panthers softball is the NCAA Division I intercollegiate softball program that represents the University of Pittsburgh, often referred to as "Pitt", located in Pittsburgh, Pennsylvania. The Pitt softball team competes in the Atlantic Coast Conference and they play their home games at Vartabedian Field which is inside the Petersen Sports Complex.

== History ==
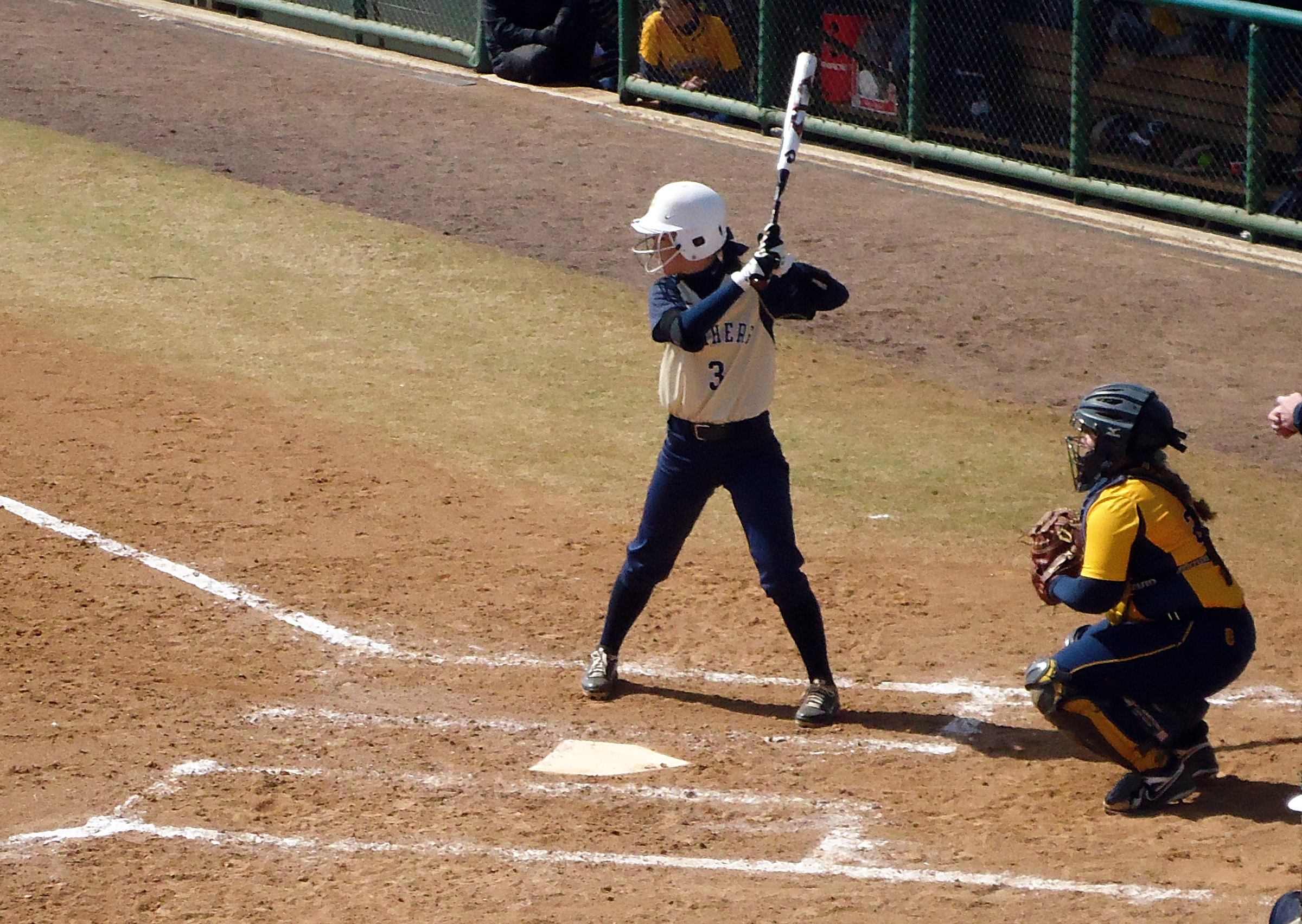
Pitt softball player Ashley Sills at bat during the 2013 Cherry Blossom Classic

The inaugural season of Pitt softball was in 1998 with the program guided by its first head coach, Michelle Phalen. The program competed as an independent during its first season in NCAA Division I and then played in the Big East Conference from 1999 to 2013. Phalen guided the program to its first winning season (31-27) and first Big East Tournament appearance in 2006 as well as its first season over .500 in Big East play (12-10) in 2008, a year that saw Pitt upset multiple nationally ranked teams. In 2009, Holly Aprile, and assistant coach in charge of pitchers and catchers under Phalen, took over as the head coach of the program. April began her tenure by leading the team to three consecutive winning seasons, a first for the program to that point, and led the 2011 team to a single season school record of 34 wins that included a victory over national ranked Georgia Tech. On July 1, 2013, Pitt moved to the Atlantic Coast Conference. In 2015, Pitt reached the ACC softball tournament championship game and earned the program's first NCAA tournament appearance on way to an appearance in the Regional Final and a program-best 37–22 record. In 2017, after a 5–0 start to the season, Pitt received the first national ranking in the program's history. Pitt won its first ACC Coastal Division championship in 2018. In August 2018, former Ohio head coach Jodi Hermanek was announced as the Panthers' new head coach following Holly Aprile's departure to become head coach at Louisville.

== Vartabedian Field ==
The team's home field includes the 600-seat Vartabedian Field, a softball ballpark that is part of the Petersen Sports Complex on the University of Pittsburgh campus that open for the 2010–11 school year. Vartabedian Field features a skinned infield with an artificial grass outfield. The stadium includes team dugouts, hitting and pitching practice areas, lighting, and a press box. The first softball game played at Vartabedian Field was a 2-1 Pitt victory over Penn State on March 29, 2011. Prior to the program moving into the Petersen Sports Complex and Vartabedian Field, the team played home games at Trees Field on the Pitt campus.

== Current coaching staff ==
- Jenny Allard - Head Coach
- - Assistant Coach
- - Assistant Coach
- - Volunteer Assistant Coach

== Conference championships ==
ACC Coastal Division

- 2018

== Conference honors ==
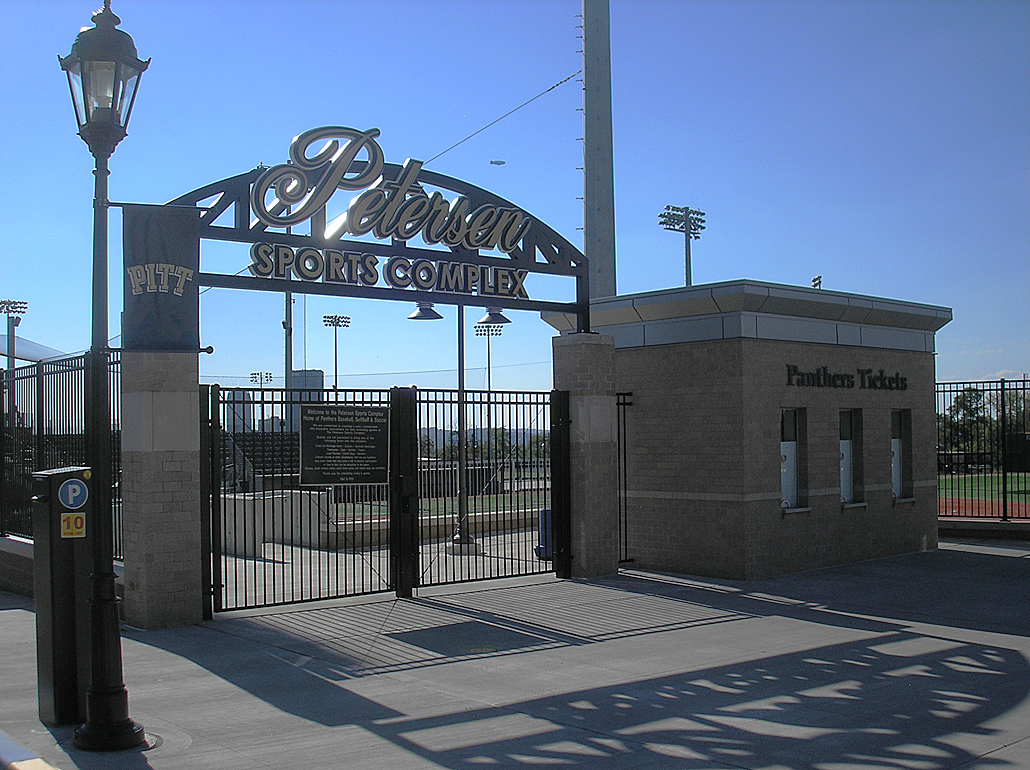
The entrance and ticket window of the Petersen Sports Complex, home of Pitt softball's Vartabedian Field

During Pitt's time as a member of the Big East Conference, Pitt players garnered 20 All-Big East selections including five First Team All-Big East selections. Two Panthers have also received ECAC All-Star status. Numerous players have also won Big East Player of the Week and Pitcher of the Week honors.

- Big East Rookie of the Year

Tori Nirschl, 2013

- Big East First Team All-Conference

Francesca DiMaria, 2003, 2005
Joey Scarf, 2006
Jessica Dignon, 2008
Samantha Card, 2008

- Atlantic Coast Conference First Team All-Conference

Jenna Modic, 2015
Erin Hershman, 2016
Giorgiana Zeremenko, 2018
Olivia Gray, 2018

- Atlantic Coast Conference Coach of the Year

Holly Aprile, 2018

== NCAA tournament results ==
The Panthers have appeared in the NCAA Tournament one time. Their combined record is 2–2.

Year	Seed	Round	Opponent	Result
2015		Regional	California; Oakland; California; Michigan	L 3–11; W 6–3; W 6–3; L 3–10

== No-hitters and perfect games ==
The following ten no-hitters have been thrown by Pitt pitchers over the program's history. There have been two perfect games thrown which are designated by bold.

- March 11, 2000 Gina Bessolo vs Colgate (won 8–0)
- April 7, 2001 Gina Bessolo at Syracuse (won 2–0)
- March 16, 2002 Nikki Gasti vs Jacksonville State (won 2–0)
- April 3, 2002 Gina Bessolo vs Youngstown State (won 10–0)
- February 23, 2003 Nikki Gasti at UNC-Charlotte (won 1–0)
- April 5, 2008 Kayla Zinger vs Connecticut (won 1–0)
- March 30, 2010 Alyssa O'Connell vs St. Francis (won 9–0)
- March 26, 2011 Cory Berliner at Seton Hall (won 9–0)
- February 27, 2016 Sarah Dawson vs. Providence (won 13–0)
- February 6, 2017 Kayla Harris vs. Southeastern Louisiana (won 5–0)

== Professional softball ==
Two former Panthers have played softball professionally in the National Pro Fastpitch league.

- Jessica Dignon played for the Washington Glory in 2008 and USSSA Pride in 2009.
- Reba Tutt played for Akron Racers in 2011.

== See also ==
- List of NCAA Division I softball programs
