= Notre Dame Fighting Irish softball =

University softball team

Notre Dame Fighting Irish
- Founded: 1989; 37 years ago
- University: University of Notre Dame
- Athletic director: Pete Bevacqua
- Head coach: Kris Ganeff (2nd season)
- Conference: ACC
- Location: Notre Dame, Indiana, US
- Home stadium: Melissa Cook Stadium (capacity: 1,250)
- Nickname: Fighting Irish
- Colors: Blue and gold

NCAA Tournament appearances
- 1994, 1995, 1996, 1999, 2000, 2001, 2002, 2003, 2004, 2005, 2006, 2007, 2008, 2009, 2010, 2011, 2012, 2013, 2014, 2015, 2016, 2017, 2018, 2019, 2021, 2022, 2023

Conference tournament championships
- 1990, 1991, 1993, 1994, 1995, 1999, 2000, 2002, 2003, 2006, 2009

Regular-season conference championships
- 1989, 1990, 1992, 1993, 1994, 1995, 1996, 1997, 1998, 1999, 2000, 2001, 2002, 2003, 2004, 2005, 2010, 2011, 2013

The Notre Dame Fighting Irish softball team represents the University of Notre Dame in the sport of softball. The Irish compete in Division I of the National Collegiate Athletic Association (NCAA) and the Atlantic Coast Conference (ACC). The Irish play their home games at Melissa Cook Stadium on the university's Notre Dame, Indiana campus, and are currently led by head coach Kris Ganeff.

== Season by Season Results ==
Record table
Season	Coach	Overall	Conference	Standing	Postseason
Notre Dame Fighting Irish (Midwestern Collegiate Conference) (1989–1995)
1989	Notre Dame	31–23	8–5	1st	
1990	Notre Dame	32–15–1	9–3	1st	
1991	Notre Dame	38–22	15–3	2nd	
1992	Notre Dame	34–30–1	7–3	1st	
1993	Notre Dame	36–13	8–2	1st	
1994	Notre Dame	41–20	9–1	1st	NCAA Regional
1995	Notre Dame	40–19	16–2	1st	NCAA Regional
Notre Dame Fighting Irish (Big East Conference) (1996–2013)
1996	Notre Dame	48–16	19–1	1st	NCAA Regional
1997	Notre Dame	35–25	16–4	1st	
1998	Notre Dame	34–22	13–3	1st	
1999	Notre Dame	42–20	16–0	1st	NCAA Regional
2000	Notre Dame	47–14	12–2	1st	NCAA Regional
2001	Notre Dame	54–7	20–0	1st	NCAA Regional
2002	Notre Dame	44–17	18–2	1st	NCAA Regional
2003	Notre Dame	38–17	14–3	1st	NCAA Regional
2004	Notre Dame	49–20	18–2	1st	NCAA Regional
2005	Notre Dame	46–15	16–2	1st	NCAA Regional
2006	Notre Dame	42–21	17–5	3rd	NCAA Regional
2007	Notre Dame	32–24	13–7	4th	NCAA Regional
2008	Notre Dame	38–22–1	14–8	4th	NCAA Regional
2009	Notre Dame	43–17	19–4	2nd	NCAA Regional
2010	Notre Dame	47–12	18–3	T-1st	NCAA Regional
2011	Notre Dame	46–11	19–1	1st	NCAA Regional
2012	Notre Dame	40–16	16–3	2nd	NCAA Regional
2013	Notre Dame	43–15	19–3	1st	NCAA Regional
Notre Dame Fighting Irish (Atlantic Coast Conference) (2014–Present)
2014	Notre Dame	41–13	16–5	2nd	NCAA Regional
2015	Notre Dame	42–15	17–6	3rd	NCAA Regional
2016	Notre Dame	43–13	13–7	3rd	NCAA Regional
2017	Notre Dame	34–23	13–11	5th	NCAA Regional
2018	Notre Dame	34–23	13–10	3rd (Atlantic)	NCAA Regional
2019	Notre Dame	37–18	18–6	2nd (Atlantic)	NCAA Regional
2020	Notre Dame	13–9	2–4	T-7th	Season canceled due to COVID-19
2021	Notre Dame	33–15	20–10	5th	NCAA Regional
2022	Notre Dame	40–12	16–5	4th	NCAA Regional
2023	Notre Dame	30–19–1	11–12–1	7th	NCAA Regional
2024	Notre Dame	27–24	9–15	T–8th	
2025	Notre Dame	23–31–1	7–17	T–11th	
Notre Dame:		905–422–3 (.682)	348–145–1 (.705)		
Total:		905–422–3 (.682)			
National champion Postseason invitational champion Conference regular season champion Conference regular season and conference tournament champion Division regular season champion Division regular season and conference tournament champion Conference tournament champion
