= 2018 Florida State Seminoles softball team =

American college softball season

2018 Florida State Seminoles softball

National Champion NCAA Tallahassee Super Regional champion NCAA Tallahassee Regional champion ACC tournament champion ACC Regular season champion
- Conference: Atlantic Coast Conference
- Record: 58–12 (21–3 ACC)
- Head coach: Lonni Alameda (10th season)
- Home stadium: JoAnne Graf Field

2018 Atlantic Coast Conference softball standings
	Conf.						Overall
Team	W		L		T	PCT	W		L		T	PCT
Atlantic
No. 1 Florida State ^{x}‍‍‡‍^{y}	21	–	3	–	0	.875	58	–	12	–	0	.829
Notre Dame ‍‍‍^{y}	13	–	10	–	0	.565	34	–	23	–	0	.596
Boston College ‍‍‍	13	–	10	–	0	.565	30	–	23	–	0	.566
Louisville ‍‍‍	10	–	12	–	0	.455	33	–	20	–	0	.623
Syracuse ‍‍‍	9	–	12	–	0	.429	30	–	20	–	0	.600
NC State ‍‍‍	5	–	18	–	0	.217	23	–	31	–	0	.426
Coastal
Pittsburgh ^{x}‍‍‍	16	–	6	–	0	.727	33	–	18	–	1	.644
North Carolina ‍‍‍	15	–	8	–	0	.652	30	–	26	–	0	.536
Georgia Tech ‍‍‍	13	–	11	–	0	.542	28	–	26	–	0	.519
Duke ‍‍‍	13	–	11	–	0	.542	29	–	27	–	0	.518
Virginia Tech ‍‍‍	7	–	16	–	0	.304	23	–	30	–	0	.434
Virginia ‍‍‍	3	–	21	–	0	.125	12	–	41	–	0	.226
x – Division champion † – Conference champion ‡ – Tournament champion y – Invited to the NCAA tournament As of June 13, 2018; Rankings from NFCA/USA Today

The 2018 Florida State Seminoles softball team represented Florida State University in the 2018 NCAA Division I softball season. The Seminoles were coached by Lonni Alameda, in her tenth season. They played their home games at JoAmne Graf Field and competed in the Atlantic Coast Conference.

The Seminoles were invited to the 2018 NCAA Division I softball tournament, where they won the Tallahassee Regional, and the Tallahassee Super Regional, and then completed a run through the Women's College World Series to claim their first NCAA Women's College World Series Championship.

== Roster ==
2018 Florida State Seminoles roster
Pitchers: 4 – Savanna Copeland – freshman; 20 – Kylee Hanson - (redshirt) Senior; 22 – Abby Evans – junior; 48 – Meghan King - (redshirt) Junior; 70 – Cassidy Davis – sophomore; Catchers: 5 – Elizabeth Mason - (redshirt) Freshman; 13 – Anna Shelnutt – sophomore; 18 – Madison Kennedy – freshman	Infielders: 23 – Tessa Daniels – junior; 26 – Leslie Farris – sophomore; 30 – Jessie Warren – senior	Outfielders: 2 – Morgan Klaevemann – senior; 6 – Zoe Casas – junior; 8 – Korina Rosario – senior; 9 – Deja Bush - (redshirt) Sophomore; Utility: 1 – Dani Morgan – sophomore; 10 – Cali Harrod – junior; 11 – Rock Benavides – freshman; 12 – Carsyn Gordon – junior; 16 – Mackenzie Puckett – freshman; 21 – Sabrina Stutsman - (redshirt) Sophomore; 24 – Sydney Sherrill – freshman

== Schedule ==
Legend
	Florida State win
	Florida State loss
*	Non-Conference game

2018 Florida State Seminoles softball game log
Regular season

February
Date	Opponent	Site/stadium	Score	Overall record	ACC record
Feb 9	vs Portland State*	Bobcat Softball Stadium • San Marcos, TX	W 18–1^{5}	1–0	
Feb 9	at Texas State*	Bobcat Softball Stadium • San Marcos, TX	W 4–2	2–0	
Feb 10	at Texas State*	Bobcat Softball Stadium • San Marcos, TX	W 8–0^{6}	3–0	
Feb 10	vs Portland State*	Bobcat Softball Stadium • San Marcos, TX	W 11–1^{5}	4–0	
Feb 14	Florida A&M*	JoAnne Graf Field • Tallahassee, FL	W 9–0^{5}	5–0	
Feb 16	Minnesota*	JoAnne Graf Field • Tallahassee, FL	W 3–2	6–0	
Feb 17	Minnesota*	JoAnne Graf Field • Tallahassee, FL	W 9–3	7–0	
Feb 17	Michigan*	JoAnne Graf Field • Tallahassee, FL	L 0–1	7–1	
Feb 18	Michigan*	JoAnne Graf Field • Tallahassee, FL	W 2–0	8–1	
Feb 20	McNeese State*	JoAnne Graf Field • Tallahassee, FL	L 1–6	8–2	
Feb 21	at South Alabama*	Jaguar Field • Mobile, AL	L 1–3	8–3	
Feb 21	at South Alabama*	Jaguar Field • Mobile, AL	W 14–1^{5}	9–3	
Feb 23	vs Northern Iowa*	Rhoads Stadium • Tuscaloosa, AL	W 9–0^{5}	10–3	
Feb 23	at Alabama*	Rhoads Stadium • Tuscaloosa, AL	L 0–3	10–4	
Feb 24	at Alabama*	Rhoads Stadium • Tuscaloosa, AL	W 3–1	11–4	
Feb 24	vs Georgia State*	Rhoads Stadium • Tuscaloosa, AL	W 8–0^{6}	12–4	

March
Date	Opponent	Site/stadium	Score	Overall record	ACC record
Mar 2	Hofstra*	JoAnne Graf Field • Tallahassee, FL	L 0–1^{10}	12–5	
Mar 2	Oregon*	JoAnne Graf Field • Tallahassee, FL	L 0–5	12–6	
Mar 3	Florida Gulf Coast*	JoAnne Graf Field • Tallahassee, FL	W 6–2	13–6	
Mar 3	Hofstra*	JoAnne Graf Field • Tallahassee, FL	W 5–0	14–6	
Mar 4	Oregon*	JoAnne Graf Field • Tallahassee, FL	W 2–1	15–6	
Mar 8	vs Penn*	Eddie C. Moore Complex • Clearwater, FL	W 12–0^{5}	16–6	
Mar 10	at North Florida*	UNF Softball Complex • Jacksonville, FL	W 13–0	17–6	
Mar 10	at North Florida*	UNF Softball Complex • Jacksonville, FL	W 9–6	18–6	
Mar 16	Virginia Tech	JoAnne Graf Field • Tallahassee, FL	W 2–0	19–6	1–0
Mar 17	Virginia Tech	JoAnne Graf Field • Tallahassee, FL	W 8–3	20–6	2–0
Mar 18	Virginia Tech	JoAnne Graf Field • Tallahassee, FL	W 6–2	21–6	3–0
Mar 21	Troy*	JoAnne Graf Field • Tallahassee, FL	W 12–2^{6}	22–6	
Mar 21	Troy*	JoAnne Graf Field • Tallahassee, FL	W 9–1^{6}	23–6	
Mar 23	Syracuse	JoAnne Graf Field • Tallahassee, FL	W 1–0	24–6	4–0
Mar 24	Syracuse	JoAnne Graf Field • Tallahassee, FL	W 6–0	25–6	5–0
Mar 25	Syracuse	JoAnne Graf Field • Tallahassee, FL	W 5–4	26–6	6–0
Mar 30	at Georgia Tech	Shirley Clements Mewborn Field • Atlanta, GA	W 13–2^{5}	27–6	7–0
Mar 31	at Georgia Tech	Shirley Clements Mewborn Field • Atlanta, GA	W 4–2	28–6	8–0

April
Date	Opponent	Site/stadium	Score	Overall record	ACC record
Apr 1	at Georgia Tech	Shirley Clements Mewborn Field • Atlanta, GA	W 11–3^{6}	29–6	9–0
Apr 4	Louisiana–Lafayette*	JoAnne Graf Field • Tallahassee, FL	W 8–0^{5}	30–6	
Apr 4	Louisiana–Lafayette*	JoAnne Graf Field • Tallahassee, FL	W 7–1	31–6	
Apr 6	Pittsburgh	JoAnne Graf Field • Tallahassee, FL	W 2–1	32–6	10–0
Apr 6	Pittsburgh	JoAnne Graf Field • Tallahassee, FL	L 0–1	32–7	10–1
Apr 8	Pittsburgh	JoAnne Graf Field • Tallahassee, FL	W 8–0^{5}	33–7	11–1
Apr 11	Florida*	JoAnne Graf Field • Tallahassee, FL	W 4–1	34–7	
Apr 13	at Boston College	Boston College Softball Field • Brighton, MA	L 0–1	34–8	11–2
Apr 13	at Boston College	Boston College Softball Field • Brighton, MA	W 5–4	35–8	12–2
Apr 14	at Boston College	Boston College Softball Field • Brighton, MA	W 5–0	36–8	13–2
Apr 21	Louisville	JoAnne Graf Field • Tallahassee, FL	W 4–0	37–8	14–2
Apr 22	Louisville	JoAnne Graf Field • Tallahassee, FL	W 8–0^{5}	38–8	15–2
Apr 23	Louisville	JoAnne Graf Field • Tallahassee, FL	W 3–1	39–8	16–2
Apr 25	at Florida*	Katie Seashole Pressly Softball Stadium • Gainesville, FL	L 1–5	39–9	
Apr 27	at Notre Dame	Melissa Cook Stadium • Notre Dame, IN	W 9–2	40–9	17–2
Apr 28	at Notre Dame	Melissa Cook Stadium • Notre Dame, IN	W 11–2^{6}	41–9	18–2
Apr 29	at Notre Dame	Melissa Cook Stadium • Notre Dame, IN	L 1–3	41–10	18–3

May
Date	Opponent	Site/stadium	Score	Overall record	ACC record
May 4	at NC State	Curtis & Jacqueline Dail Softball Stadium • Raleigh, NC	W 9–1^{5}	42–10	19–3
May 5	at NC State	Curtis & Jacqueline Dail Softball Stadium • Raleigh, NC	W 5–0	43–10	20–3
May 6	at NC State	Curtis & Jacqueline Dail Softball Stadium • Raleigh, NC	W 3–0	44–10	21–3

Postseason

ACC tournament
Date	Opponent	Rank (seed)	Site/stadium	Score	Overall record	ACCT Record
May 10	(8) Louisville	(1)	Shirley Clements Mewborn Field • Atlanta, GA	W 7–4	45–10	1–0
May 11	(5) Notre Dame	(1)	Shirley Clements Mewborn Field • Atlanta, GA	W 6–1	46–10	2–0
May 12	(2) Pittsburgh	(1)	Shirley Clements Mewborn Field • Atlanta, GA	W 5–4	47–10	3–0

NCAA Tallahassee Regional
Date	Opponent	Rank (seed)	Site/stadium	Score	Overall record	NCAAT record
May 18	Jacksonville State	JoAnne Graf Field • Tallahassee, FL	W 8–0^{5}	48–10	1–0	
May 19	Auburn	JoAnne Graf Field • Tallahassee, FL	W 2–1^{8}	49–10	2–0	
May 20	Jacksonville State	JoAnne Graf Field • Tallahassee, FL	W 10–0	50–10	3–0	

NCAA Tallahassee Super Regional
Date	Opponent	Rank (seed)	Site/stadium	Score	Overall record	SR record
May 25	LSU	JoAnne Graf Field • Tallahassee, FL	L 5–6	50–11	0–1	
May 26	LSU	JoAnne Graf Field • Tallahassee, FL	W 8–5^{11}	51–11	1–1	
May 26	LSU	JoAnne Graf Field • Tallahassee, FL	W 3–1	52–11	2–1	

NCAA Women's College World Series
Date	Opponent	Rank (seed)	Site/stadium	Score	Overall record	WCWS record
May 31	(3) UCLA	(6)	ASA Hall of Fame Stadium • Oklahoma City, OK	L 4–7	52–12	0–1
June 2	(7) Georgia	(6)	ASA Hall of Fame Stadium • Oklahoma City, OK	W 7–2	53–12	1–1
June 2	(1) Oregon	(6)	ASA Hall of Fame Stadium • Oklahoma City, OK	W 4–1	54–12	2–1
June 3	(3) UCLA	(6)	ASA Hall of Fame Stadium • Oklahoma City, OK	W 3–1	55–12	3–1
June 3	(3) UCLA	(6)	ASA Hall of Fame Stadium • Oklahoma City, OK	W 12–6	56–12	4–1
June 4	(5) Washington	(6)	ASA Hall of Fame Stadium • Oklahoma City, OK	W 1–0	57–12	5–1
June 4	(5) Washington	(6)	ASA Hall of Fame Stadium • Oklahoma City, OK	W 8–3	58–12	6–1
