= 2018 NCAA Division I softball season =

American college softball season

- Defending Champions: Oklahoma

Tournament

Women's College World Series
- Champions: Florida State (1st title)
- Runners-up: Washington (13th WCWS Appearance)
- Winning Coach: Lonni Alameda (1st title)
- WCWS MOP: Jessie Warren (Florida State)

Seasons
- ← 2017 2019 →

The 2018 NCAA Division I softball season, play of college softball in the United States organized by the National Collegiate Athletic Association (NCAA) at the Division I level, began in February 2018. The season progressed through the regular season, many conference tournaments and championship series, and concluded with the 2018 NCAA Division I softball tournament and 2018 Women's College World Series. The Women's College World Series, consisting of the eight remaining teams in the NCAA Tournament and held annually in Oklahoma City at ASA Hall of Fame Stadium, ended on June 4, 2018.

== Conference standings ==
2018 American Athletic Conference softball standings
	Conf.				Overall
Team	W		L	PCT	W		L	PCT
South Florida ‍†‍‍^{y}	14	–	7	.667	39	–	23	.629
Houston ‍‍‍^{y}	13	–	8	.619	37	–	22	.627
UCF ‍‍‍	12	–	9	.571	34	–	22	.607
Wichita State ‍‍‍^{y}	12	–	9	.571	32	–	23	.582
Memphis ‍‍‍	10	–	11	.476	37	–	21	.638
Tulsa ‍‍‡‍^{y}	10	–	11	.476	34	–	25	.576
East Carolina ‍‍‍	8	–	13	.381	23	–	32	.418
UConn ‍‍‍	5	–	16	.238	20	–	35	.364
† – Conference champion ‡ – Tournament champion y – Invited to the NCAA tournament As of May 31, 2018; Rankings from USA Today/NFCA Coaches

2018 Atlantic Coast Conference softball standings
	Conf.						Overall
Team	W		L		T	PCT	W		L		T	PCT
Atlantic
No. 1 Florida State ^{x}‍‍‡‍^{y}	21	–	3	–	0	.875	58	–	12	–	0	.829
Notre Dame ‍‍‍^{y}	13	–	10	–	0	.565	34	–	23	–	0	.596
Boston College ‍‍‍	13	–	10	–	0	.565	30	–	23	–	0	.566
Louisville ‍‍‍	10	–	12	–	0	.455	33	–	20	–	0	.623
Syracuse ‍‍‍	9	–	12	–	0	.429	30	–	20	–	0	.600
NC State ‍‍‍	5	–	18	–	0	.217	23	–	31	–	0	.426
Coastal
Pittsburgh ^{x}‍‍‍	16	–	6	–	0	.727	33	–	18	–	1	.644
North Carolina ‍‍‍	15	–	8	–	0	.652	30	–	26	–	0	.536
Georgia Tech ‍‍‍	13	–	11	–	0	.542	28	–	26	–	0	.519
Duke ‍‍‍	13	–	11	–	0	.542	29	–	27	–	0	.518
Virginia Tech ‍‍‍	7	–	16	–	0	.304	23	–	30	–	0	.434
Virginia ‍‍‍	3	–	21	–	0	.125	12	–	41	–	0	.226
x – Division champion † – Conference champion ‡ – Tournament champion y – Invited to the NCAA tournament As of June 13, 2018; Rankings from NFCA/USA Today

2018 Big 12 Conference softball standings
	Conf.				Overall
Team	W		L	PCT	W		L	PCT
No. 4 Oklahoma ‍†‍‡‍^{y}	18	–	0	1.000	57	–	5	.919
No. 19 Baylor ‍‍‍^{y}	12	–	6	.667	38	–	18	.679
Oklahoma State ‍‍‍^{y}	12	–	6	.667	39	–	22	.639
No. 25 Texas ‍‍‍^{y}	10	–	8	.556	33	–	26	.559
Texas Tech ‍‍‍	5	–	13	.278	31	–	28	.525
Iowa State ‍‍‍	4	–	14	.222	23	–	33	.411
Kansas ‍‍‍	2	–	16	.111	27	–	25	.519
† – Conference champion ‡ – Tournament champion y – Invited to the NCAA tournament Rankings from NFCA

2018 Big Ten Conference softball standings
	Conf.				Overall
Team	W		L	PCT	W		L	PCT
No. 17 Michigan ‍†‍‍^{y}	18	–	3	.857	43	–	11	.796
No. 25 Minnesota ‍‍‡‍^{y}	17	–	4	.810	36	–	15	.706
Indiana ‍‍‍	17	–	6	.739	25	–	29	.463
Ohio State ‍‍‍^{y}	14	–	8	.636	34	–	13	.723
Northwestern ‍‍‍^{y}	14	–	8	.636	36	–	16	.692
Illinois ‍‍‍	13	–	8	.619	36	–	17	.679
Wisconsin ‍‍‍^{y}	11	–	9	.550	27	–	20	.574
Michigan State ‍‍‍	10	–	12	.455	24	–	25	.490
Nebraska ‍‍‍	9	–	13	.409	31	–	22	.585
Purdue ‍‍‍	7	–	15	.318	16	–	39	.291
Maryland ‍‍‍	7	–	16	.304	18	–	36	.333
Iowa ‍‍‍	6	–	16	.273	20	–	31	.392
Penn State ‍‍‍	5	–	18	.217	9	–	41	.180
Rutgers ‍‍‍	4	–	16	.200	19	–	31	.380
† – Conference champion ‡ – Tournament champion y – Invited to the NCAA tournament As of May 7, 2018; Rankings from NFCA

2018 Pac-12 Conference softball standings
	Conf.				Overall
Team	W		L	PCT	W		L	PCT
No. 6 Oregon ‍†‍‍^{y}	21	–	3	.875	53	–	10	.841
No. 3 UCLA ‍‍‍^{y}	20	–	4	.833	58	–	7	.892
No. 7 Arizona State ‍‍‍^{y}	16	–	8	.667	48	–	13	.787
No. 2 Washington ‍‍‍^{y}	15	–	8	.652	52	–	10	.839
No. 11 Arizona ‍‍‍^{y}	13	–	11	.542	43	–	16	.729
Oregon State ‍‍‍^{y}	9	–	14	.391	30	–	28	.517
California ‍‍‍^{y}	7	–	16	.304	35	–	21	.625
Stanford ‍‍‍	3	–	21	.125	24	–	31	.436
Utah ‍‍‍	2	–	21	.087	20	–	30	.400
† – Conference champion y – Invited to the NCAA tournament As of June 30, 2018; Rankings from NFCA/USA Today

2018 Southeastern Conference softball standings
	Conf.				Overall
Team	W		L	PCT	W		L	PCT
No. 4 Florida ‍†‍‡‍^{y}	20	–	4	.833	47	–	8	.855
No. 8 Georgia ‍‍‍	16	–	8	.667	43	–	10	.811
No. 12 South Carolina ‍‍‍	15	–	9	.625	43	–	13	.768
No. 7 Tennessee ‍‍‍	14	–	10	.583	44	–	11	.800
No. 11 LSU ‍‍‍	13	–	10	.565	40	–	13	.755
No. 14 Texas A&M ‍‍‍	13	–	11	.542	40	–	15	.727
No. 18 Arkansas ‍‍‍	12	–	12	.500	37	–	14	.725
No. 13 Alabama ‍‍‍	12	–	12	.500	32	–	17	.653
No. 15 Auburn ‍‍‍	11	–	12	.478	40	–	14	.741
No. 19 Kentucky ‍‍‍	8	–	15	.348	31	–	18	.633
No. 25 Mississippi State ‍‍‍	7	–	17	.292	35	–	20	.636
Ole Miss ‍‍‍	7	–	17	.292	30	–	22	.577
Missouri ‍‍‍	6	–	17	.261	28	–	27	.509
† – Conference champion ‡ – Tournament champion y – Invited to the NCAA tournament As of Mar. 25, 2018; Rankings from NFCA

2018 Southland Conference softball standings
	Conf.						Overall
Team	W		L		PCT		W	L		PCT
Nicholls ‍†‍‍	21	–	6	–	0	.778		40	–	15	–	0	.727
McNeese State** ‍‍‡‍^{y}	18	–	9	–	0	.667		41	–	21	–	0	.661
Southeastern Louisiana ‍‍‍	18	–	9	–	0	.667		38	–	21	–	0	.644
Stephen F. Austin ‍‍‍	18	–	9	–	0	.667		31	–	24	–	0	.564
Central Arkansas ‍‍‍	16	–	11	–	0	.593		29	–	27	–	0	.518
Abilene Christian ‍‍‍	15	–	12	–	0	.556		23	–	26	–	0	.469
Northwestern State ‍‍‍	14	–	13	–	0	.519		28	–	25	–	0	.528
Sam Houston State ‍‍‍	13	–	14	–	0	.481		24	–	33	–	0	.421
Lamar ‍‍‍	11	–	16	–	0	.407		27	–	28	–	0	.491
Incarnate Word ‍‍‍	7	–	20	–	0	.259		15	–	34	–	0	.306
Houston Baptist ‍‍‍	6	–	21	–	0	.222		9	–	34	–	0	.209
Texas A&M–Corpus Christi ‍‍‍	5	–	22	–	0	.185		14	–	37	–	1	.279
† – Conference champion ‡ – Tournament champion y – Invited to the NCAA tournament As of May 19, 2018; Rankings from NFCA

2018 Sun Belt Conference softball standings
	Conf.				Overall
Team	W		L	PCT	W		L	PCT
No. 18 Louisiana ‍†‍‍^{y}	21	–	6	.778	41	–	16	.719
No. 25 Texas State ‍‍‡‍^{y}	18	–	5	.783	43	–	16	.729
UT Arlington ‍‍‍	15	–	11	.577	31	–	27	.534
Georgia State ‍‍‍	13	–	12	.520	30	–	25	.545
Troy ‍‍‍	14	–	13	.519	34	–	26	.567
South Alabama ‍‍‍	13	–	13	.500	29	–	27	.518
Georgia Southern ‍‍‍	12	–	15	.444	28	–	25	.528
Louisiana–Monroe ‍‍‍	10	–	17	.370	24	–	29	.453
Coastal Carolina ‍‍‍	9	–	17	.346	26	–	28	.481
Appalachian State ‍‍‍	4	–	20	.167	17	–	35	.327
† – Conference champion ‡ – Tournament champion y – Invited to the NCAA tournament As of February 27, 2019; Rankings from NFCA

== National Invitational Softball Championship ==
Loyola Marymount Lions defeated the UC Riverside Highlanders in the championship; Hannah Bandimere was named MVP for the series.

== Women's College World Series ==
The 2018 Women's College World Series began on June 1–4 in Oklahoma City.

First round
1	Oregon	11
8	Arizona State	6
4	Oklahoma	0
5	Washington	2
8	Arizona State	0
4	Oklahoma	2
3	UCLA	7
6	Florida State	4
2	Florida	11^{(5)}
7	Georgia	3
6	Florida State	7
7	Georgia	2

Second round
1	Oregon	2
5	Washington	6
2	Florida	0
4	Oklahoma	2
3	UCLA	6
2	Florida	5
1	Oregon	1
6	Florida State	4

Semifinals
5	Washington	3	—
4	Oklahoma	0	—
3	UCLA	1	6
6	Florida State	3	12

Finals
5	Washington	0	3	—
6	Florida State	1	8	—

== Season leaders ==
Batting

- Batting average: .483 – Holly Speers, Kent State Golden Flashes
- RBIs: 76 – Brook Miko, Towson Tigers
- Home runs: 30 – Jocelyn Alo, Oklahoma Sooners

Pitching

- Wins: 33-6 – Meghan Beaubien, Michigan Wolverines
- ERA: 0.48 (7 ER/102.1 IP) – Brittany Gray, Georgia Bulldogs
- Strikeouts: 353 – Lindsey Bert, Furman Paladins

== Records ==
NCAA Division I single game combined strikeouts: 46 – Brianna Jones, Southern Illinois Salukis (20) & Morgan Florey, Evansville Purple Aces (26); April 28, 2018 (16 innings)

Senior class single game walks: 6 – Ivie Drake, Georgia State Panthers; April 18, 2018

Senior class 7 inning single game strikeouts: 21 – Alexis Osorio, Alabama Crimson Tide; March 10, 2018

Freshman class doubles: 29 – Sydney Sherrill, Florida State Seminoles

Freshman class saves: 15 – Taylor Bauman, Florida Gulf Coast Eagles

Team walks: 360 – Florida Gators

== Awards ==
- USA Softball Collegiate Player of the Year:

Rachel Garcia, UCLA Bruins

- Honda Sports Award Softball:

Rachel Garcia, UCLA Bruins

- NFCA National Player of the Year:

Rachel Garcia, UCLA Bruins

- espnW National Player of The Year:

Rachel Garcia, UCLA Bruins

YEAR	G	AB	R	H	BA	RBI	HR	3B	2B	TB	SLG	BB	SO	SB	SBA
2018	61	174	29	59	.339	54	11	0	6	98	.563%	23	26	0	0

YEAR	W	L	GP	GS	CG	SHO	SV	IP	H	R	ER	BB	SO	ERA	WHIP
2018	29	4	39	27	21	9	2	208.0	104	48	39	48	315	1.31	0.73

- NFCA National Freshman of the Year:

Jocelyn Alo, Oklahoma Sooners

YEAR	G	AB	R	H	BA	RBI	HR	3B	2B	TB	SLG	BB	SO	SB	SBA
2018	62	174	64	73	.445	72	30	0	7	170	.977%	49	19	4	5

- NFCA Catcher of the Year:

Gwen Svekis, Oregon

- NFCA Golden Shoe Award:

Cortni Emanuel, Georgia

== All America Teams ==
The following players were members of the All-American Teams.

First Team

Position	Player	Class	School
P	Kelly Barnhill	JR.	Florida Gators
P	Megan Kleist	JR.	Oregon Ducks
P	Giselle Juarez	SO.	Arizona State Sun Devils
C	Gwen Svekis	SR.	Oregon Ducks
1B	Alyssa Palomino	SO.	Arizona Wildcats
2B	Aubrey Leach	JR.	Tennessee Lady Vols
3B	Sydney Romero	JR.	Oklahoma Sooners
SS	Sis Bates	SO.	Washington Huskies
OF	Aaliyah Jordan	FR.	UCLA Bruins
OF	Jessie Scroggins	SR.	Baylor Bears
OF	Amanda Lorenz	JR.	Florida Gators
UT	Rachel Garcia	SO.	UCLA Bruins
UT	Jocelyn Alo	FR.	Oklahoma Sooners
AT-L	Holly Speers	JR.	Kent State Golden Flashes
AT-L	Paige Parker	SR.	Oklahoma Sooners
AT-L	Vanessa Shippy	SR.	Oklahoma State Cowgirls
AT-L	Meghan Beaubien	FR.	Michigan Wolverines
AT-L	Ivie Drake	SR.	Georgia State Panthers

Second Team

Position	Player	Class	School
P	Miranda Elish	SO.	Oregon Ducks
P	Kylee Hanson	SR.	FSU Seminoles
P	Brittany Gray	SR.	Georgia Bulldogs
C	Kendyl Lindaman	SO.	Minnesota Golden Gophers
1B	Victoria Vidales	SR.	Texas A&M Aggies
2B	Kylee Perez	SR.	UCLA Bruins
3B	Nicole DeWitt	SR.	Florida Gators
SS	Lili Piper	JR.	Ohio State Buckeyes
OF	Kaylee Tow	FR.	Alabama Crimson Tide
OF	Cortni Emanuel	SR.	Georgia Bulldogs
OF	Annie Murphy	SR.	Boston College Eagles
UT	Savannah Heebner	JR.	Houston Cougars
UT	Taylor Rowland	SO.	Long Beach State 49ers
AT-L	Allie Walljasper	SR.	LSU Tigers
AT-L	Rachel Lewis	FR.	Northwestern Wildcats
AT-L	Jessie Warren	SR.	FSU Seminoles
AT-L	Janae Jefferson	FR.	Texas Longhorns
AT-L	Taran Alvelo	JR.	Washington Huskies

Third Team

Position	Player	Class	School
P	Carly Hoover	SR.	LSU Tigers
P	Nicole Newman	JR.	Drake Bulldogs
P	Randi Rupp	SR.	Texas State Bobcats
C	Libby Sugg	JR.	BYU Cougars
1B	Jessica Hartwell	JR.	Texas Tech Red Raiders
2B	Sydney Sherrill	FR.	FSU Seminoles
3B	Jena Cozza	SR.	UMass Minutewomen
SS	Alyssa DiCarlo	JR.	Georgia Bulldogs
OF	Kara Shutt	SR.	Elon Phoenix
OF	Kate Gordon	SO.	James Madison Dukes
OF	Paige Murphy	SR.	Eastern Kentucky Colonels
UT	Odicci Alexander	SO.	James Madison Dukes
UT	Maddie Roth	JR.	Kennesaw State Owls
AT-L	Meghan Gregg	SR.	Tennessee Lady Vols
AT-L	Faith Canfield	JR.	Michigan Wolverines
AT-L	Gabbie Plain	FR.	Washington Huskies
AT-L	Katie Prebble	FR.	Gardner-Webb Runnin' Bulldogs
AT-L	Jenna Lilley	SR.	Oregon Ducks
