= List of Washington Huskies softball seasons =

The following is a list of Washington Huskies softball seasons. The University of Washington is a member of the Pac-12 Conference of the NCAA Division I. The Huskies have won four conference championships, appeared in the NCAA Division I softball tournament 37 times, and in the Women's College World Series 14 times. The Huskies won the National Championship in 2009, and appeared in the finals three more times.

== Season results ==
National champions	WCWS Appearance	NCAA Tournament appearance	Conference champions

Season	Head coach	Conference	Season results									Postseason result
Season	Head coach	Conference	Overall				Conference					Postseason result
Season	Head coach	Conference	Wins	Losses	Ties	%	Wins	Losses	Ties	%	Finish	Postseason result
1993	Teresa Wilson	Pac-12	31	27	0	.534	7	18	0	.280	8th	—
1994	Teresa Wilson	Pac-12	44	21	0	.677	14	10	0	.583	3rd	NCAA Regional
1995	Teresa Wilson	Pac-12	50	23	0	.685	17	11	0	.607	4th	NCAA Regional
1996	Teresa Wilson	Pac-12	59	9	0	.868	23	4	0	.852	1st	Women's College World Series Runners-up
1997	Teresa Wilson	Pac-12	50	19	0	.725	16	11	0	.593	3rd	Women's College World Series
1998	Teresa Wilson	Pac-12	52	15	0	.776	19	9	0	.679	2nd	Women's College World Series
1999	Teresa Wilson	Pac-12	51	18	0	.739	15	12	0	.556	3rd	Women's College World Series Runners-up
2000	Teresa Wilson	Pac-12	62	9	0	.873	17	4	0	.810	1st	Women's College World Series
2001	Teresa Wilson	Pac-12	40	23	0	.635	11	10	0	.524	T-3rd	NCAA Regional
2002	Teresa Wilson	Pac-12	46	18	0	.719	13	8	0	.619	T-3rd	NCAA Regional
2003	Teresa Wilson	Pac-12	47	16	1	.742	9	12	0	.429	5th	Women's College World Series
2004	Scott Centala/Steve Dailey	Pac-12	40	19	0	.678	10	10	0	.500	5th	Women's College World Series
2005	Heather Tarr	Pac-12	35	22	0	.614	10	11	0	.476	6th	NCAA Super Regional
2006	Heather Tarr	Pac-12	35	25	0	.583	6	15	0	.286	7th	NCAA Super Regional
2007	Heather Tarr	Pac-12	42	19	0	.689	12	9	0	.571	T-3rd	Women's College World Series
2008	Heather Tarr	Pac-12	30	25	1	.545	7	14	0	.333	T-5th	NCAA Regional
2009	Heather Tarr	Pac-12	51	12	0	.810	14	7	0	.667	2nd	NCAA Champions
2010	Heather Tarr	Pac-12	50	9	0	.847	17	4	0	.810	1st	Women's College World Series
2011	Heather Tarr	Pac-12	37	16	0	.698	9	12	0	.429	T-6th	NCAA Super Regional
2012	Heather Tarr	Pac-12	39	19	0	.672	7	16	0	.304	8th	NCAA Super Regional
2013	Heather Tarr	Pac-12	45	17	0	.726	12	5	0	.706	T-2nd	Women's College World Series
2014	Heather Tarr	Pac-12	37	15	0	.712	13	9	0	.591	4th	NCAA Super Regional
2015	Heather Tarr	Pac-12	42	17	0	.712	11	11	0	.500	6th	NCAA Regional
2016	Heather Tarr	Pac-12	39	15	0	.722	16	8	0	.667	3rd	NCAA Super Regional
2017	Heather Tarr	Pac-12	50	14	0	.769	16	8	0	.667	3rd	Women's College World Series
2018	Heather Tarr	Pac-12	52	10	0	.839	15	8	0	.652	4th	Women's College World Series Runners-up
2019	Heather Tarr	Pac-12	52	9	0	.852	20	4	0	.833	T-1st	Women's College World Series
2020	Heather Tarr	Pac-12	23	1	0	.958	Season canceled due to COVID-19 pandemic					
2021	Heather Tarr	Pac-12	45	14	0	.763	18	5	0	.783	2nd	NCAA Super Regional
2022	Heather Tarr	Pac-12	38	17	0	.691	14	10	0	.583	3rd	NCAA Regional
2023	Heather Tarr	Pac-12	44	15	0	.746	16	8	0	.667	3rd	Women's College World Series
2024	Heather Tarr	Pac-12	32	15	0	.681	13	10	0	.565	T–3rd	NCAA Regional
2025	Heather Tarr	Big Ten	35	19	0	.648	12	9	0	.571	T–3rd	NCAA Regional
2026	Heather Tarr	Big Ten	37	20	0	.649	16	8	0	.667	T–5th	NCAA Regional
