= 2018 UCLA Bruins softball team =

American college softball season

2018 UCLA Bruins softball

NCAA Los Angeles Super Regional champion NCAA Los Angeles Regional champion

Women's College World Series, 1–2
- Conference: Pac-12 Conference
- Record: 58–7 (20–4 Pac-12)
- Head coach: Kelly Inouye-Perez (12th season)
- Home stadium: Easton Stadium

2018 Pac-12 Conference softball standings
	Conf.				Overall
Team	W		L	PCT	W		L	PCT
No. 6 Oregon ‍†‍‍^{y}	21	–	3	.875	53	–	10	.841
No. 3 UCLA ‍‍‍^{y}	20	–	4	.833	58	–	7	.892
No. 7 Arizona State ‍‍‍^{y}	16	–	8	.667	48	–	13	.787
No. 2 Washington ‍‍‍^{y}	15	–	8	.652	52	–	10	.839
No. 11 Arizona ‍‍‍^{y}	13	–	11	.542	43	–	16	.729
Oregon State ‍‍‍^{y}	9	–	14	.391	30	–	28	.517
California ‍‍‍^{y}	7	–	16	.304	35	–	21	.625
Stanford ‍‍‍	3	–	21	.125	24	–	31	.436
Utah ‍‍‍	2	–	21	.087	20	–	30	.400
† – Conference champion y – Invited to the NCAA tournament As of June 30, 2018; Rankings from NFCA/USA Today

The 2018 UCLA Bruins softball team represented the University of California, Los Angeles in the 2018 NCAA Division I softball season. The Bruins were coached by Kelly Inouye-Perez, in her twelfth season as head coach. The Bruins played their home games at Easton Stadium and finished with a record of 58–7. They competed in the Pac-12 Conference, where they finished second with a 20–4 record.

The Bruins were invited to the 2018 NCAA Division I softball tournament, where they won the Los Angeles Regional and Super Regional to advance to the Women's College World Series. They finished in third place with wins against eventual champion Florida State and quarterfinalist Florida and a pair of semifinal losses to Florida State.

== Personnel ==
=== Roster ===
2018 UCLA Bruins roster
Pitchers: 00 - Rachel Garcia - (redshirt) Sophomore; 4 - Holly Azevedo - Freshman; 15 - Johanna Grauer - Senior; 18 - Selina Ta'amilo - Senior; Catchers: 21 - Taylor Pack - Junior; 25 - Paige Halstead - Junior; 52 - Maddie Skibitzki - Sophomore	Outfielders: 5 - Julie Rodriguez - Freshman; 7 - Jenna Crawford - Sophomore; 11 - Zia Norris - Freshman; 12 - Stevie Wisz - Junior; 13 - Imani Johnson - Junior; 22 - Danae Blodgett - Junior; 23 - Aaliyah Jordan - (redshirt) Freshman; 27 - Jacqui Prober - Sophomore; 32 - Alana Snow - Freshman	Infielders: 3 - Briana Perez - Freshman; 8 - Kylee Perez - Senior; 10 - Malia Quarles - Freshman; 33 - Brianna Tautalafua - Junior; 37 - Kinsley Washington - Freshman; Utility: 42 - Jelly Felix - (redshirt) Senior; 46 - Zoe Shaw - Junior; 48 - Bubba Nickles - Sophomore; 88 - Madeline Jelenicki - Senior

=== Coaches ===
2018 UCLA Bruins softball coaching staff
- Kelly Inouye-Perez - Head coach - 12th season
- Lisa Fernandez - Assistant Coach - 20th season
- Kirk Walker - Assistant Coach - 17th season

== Schedule ==
Legend
	UCLA win
	UCLA loss
*	Non-Conference game

2018 UCLA Bruins softball game log
Regular season

February
Date	Opponent	Site/stadium	Score	Overall record	Pac-12 record
Feb 9	Maryland*	Easton Stadium • Los Angeles, CA (Stacy Winsberg Memorial Tournament)	W 5–1	1–0	
Feb 9	Middle Tennessee*	Easton Stadium • Los Angeles, CA (Stacy Winsberg Memorial Tournament)	W 11–0 ^{(5)}	2–0	
Feb 10	Cal Poly*	Easton Stadium • Los Angeles, CA (Stacy Winsberg Memorial Tournament)	W 13–0 ^{(5)}	3–0	
Feb 11	Cal Poly*	Easton Stadium • Los Angeles, CA (Stacy Winsberg Memorial Tournament)	W 7–2	4–0	
Feb 11	UC Riverside*	Easton Stadium • Los Angeles, CA (Stacy Winsberg Memorial Tournament)	W 13–2 ^{(5)}	5–0	
Feb 15	Fordham*	Easton Stadium • Los Angeles, CA	W 4–0	6–0	
Feb 17	vs UC Santa Barbara*	Big League Dreams Sports Park • Cathedral City, CA (Mary Nutter Collegiate Classic I)	W 9–1 ^{(5)}	7–0	
Feb 18	vs Syracuse*	Big League Dreams Sports Park • Cathedral City, CA (Mary Nutter Collegiate Classic I)	W 6–0	8–0	
Feb 18	vs UAB*	Big League Dreams Sports Park • Cathedral City, CA (Mary Nutter Collegiate Classic I)	W 8–0 ^{(8)}	9–0	
Feb 19	vs Grand Canyon*	Big League Dreams Sports Park • Cathedral City, CA (Mary Nutter Collegiate Classic I)	W 7–6	10–0	
Feb 19	vs Team Japan*	Big League Dreams Sports Park • Cathedral City, CA (Mary Nutter Collegiate Classic I)	L 0–6 (Exh.)		
Feb 23	vs Nebraska*	Big League Dreams Sports Park • Cathedral City, CA (Mary Nutter Collegiate Classic II)	W 5–0	11–0	
Feb 23	vs Liberty*	Big League Dreams Sports Park • Cathedral City, CA (Mary Nutter Collegiate Classic II)	W 4–3	12–0	
Feb 24	vs LSU*	Big League Dreams Sports Park • Cathedral City, CA (Mary Nutter Collegiate Classic II)	W 9–1 ^{(5)}	13–0	
Feb 25	vs Missouri*	Big League Dreams Sports Park • Cathedral City, CA (Mary Nutter Collegiate Classic II)	W 4–0	14–0	
Feb 25	vs Fresno State*	Big League Dreams Sports Park • Cathedral City, CA (Mary Nutter Collegiate Classic II)	W7–3	15–0	

March
Date	Opponent	Site/stadium	Score	Overall record	Pac-12 record
Mar 2	vs UCF*	USD Softball Complex • San Diego, CA (San Diego Classic I)	W 9–1 ^{(5)}	16–0	
Mar 3	vs Minnesota*	USD Softball Complex • San Diego, CA (San Diego Classic I)	W 12–4 ^{(6)}	17–0	
Mar 3	at San Diego*	USD Softball Complex • San Diego, CA (San Diego Classic I)	W 8–3	18–0	
Mar 4	vs Santa Clara*	SDSU Softball Stadium • San Diego, CA (San Diego Classic I)	W 8–0 ^{(6)}	19–0	
Mar 9	vs Michigan State*	LBSU Softball Complex • Long Beach, CA (Louisville Slugger Invitational)	W 10–0 ^{(5)}	20–0	
Mar 9	vs San Jose State*	LBSU Softball Complex • Long Beach, CA(Louisville Slugger Invitational)	W 10–0 ^{(5)}	21–0	
Mar 10	vs Boston University*	LBSU Softball Complex • Long Beach, CA(Louisville Slugger Invitational)	W 10–2 ^{(6)}	22–0	
Mar 11	vs Ohio State*	LBSU Softball Complex • Long Beach, CA(Louisville Slugger Invitational)	W 11–0 ^{(5)}	23–0	
Mar 11	at Long Beach State*	LBSU Softball Complex • Long Beach, CA(Louisville Slugger Invitational)	W 6–5	24–0	
Mar 16	at Oregon	Jane Sanders Stadium • Eugene, OR	W 6–2	25–0	1–0
Mar 17	at Oregon	Jane Sanders Stadium • Eugene, OR	L 5–7	25–1	1–1
Mar 18	at Oregon	Jane Sanders Stadium • Eugene, OR	L 0–3	25–2	1–2
Mar 24	Oregon State	Easton Stadium • Los Angeles, CA	W 3–2	26–2	2–2
Mar 25	Oregon State	Easton Stadium • Los Angeles, CA	W 5–3	27–2	3–2
Mar 26	Oregon State	Easton Stadium • Los Angeles, CA	W 7–5	28–2	4–2
Mar 29	at Utah	Dumke Family Softball Stadium • Salt Lake City, UT	W 9–5	29–2	5–2
Mar 30	at Utah	Dumke Family Softball Stadium • Salt Lake City, UT	W 7–3	30–2	6–2
Mar 31	at Utah	Dumke Family Softball Stadium • Salt Lake City, UT	W 9–4	31–2	7–2

April
Date	Opponent	Site/stadium	Score	Overall record	Pac-12 record
Apr 3	Cal State Northridge*	Easton Stadium • Los Angeles, CA	W 8–3	32–2	
Apr 6	Stanford	Easton Stadium • Los Angeles, CA	W 5–2	33–2	8–2
Apr 7	Stanford	Easton Stadium • Los Angeles, CA	W 3–0	34–2	9–2
Apr 8	Stanford	Easton Stadium • Los Angeles, CA	L 1–4	34–3	9–3
Apr 13	at Arizona	Rita Hillenbrand Memorial Stadium • Tucson, AZ	W 7–6	35–3	10–3
Apr 14	at Arizona	Rita Hillenbrand Memorial Stadium • Tucson, AZ	W 7–3	36–3	11–3
Apr 15	at Arizona	Rita Hillenbrand Memorial Stadium • Tucson, AZ	W 10–3	37–3	12–3
Apr 20	Washington	Easton Stadium • Los Angeles, CA	W 3–0	38–3	13–3
Apr 21	Washington	Easton Stadium • Los Angeles, CA	W 3–2	39–3	14–3
Apr 22	Washington	Easton Stadium • Los Angeles, CA	W 1–0	40–3	15–3
Apr 27	Oklahoma State*	Easton Stadium • Los Angeles, CA	W 7–2	41–3	
Apr 27	South Dakota*	Easton Stadium • Los Angeles, CA	W 11–1 ^{(5)}	42–3	
Apr 28	South Dakota*	Easton Stadium • Los Angeles, CA	W 4–1	43–3	
Apr 28	Oklahoma State*	Easton Stadium • Los Angeles, CA	W 7–0	44–3	

May
Date	Opponent	Site/stadium	Score	Overall record	Pac-12 record
May 1	at Cal State Fullerton*	Anderson Family Field • Fullerton, CA	W 5–3	45–3	
May 4	at California	Levine-Fricke Field • Berkeley, CA	W 5–0	46–3	16–3
May 5	at California	Levine-Fricke Field • Berkeley, CA	W 2–1	47–3	17–3
May 6	at California	Levine-Fricke Field • Berkeley, CA	W 10–5	48–3	18–3
May 10	Arizona State	Easton Stadium • Los Angeles, CA	L 0–3	48–4	18–4
May 11	Arizona State	Easton Stadium • Los Angeles, CA	W 5–1	49–4	19–4
May 12	Arizona State	Easton Stadium • Los Angeles, CA	W 2–1 ^{(9)}	50–4	20–4

Postseason

NCAA Los Angeles Regional
Date	Opponent	Seed	Site/stadium	Score	Overall record	Reg record
May 18	Sacramento State	Easton Stadium • Los Angeles, CA	W 3–0	51–4	1–0	
May 19	Cal State Fullerton	Easton Stadium • Los Angeles, CA	L 2–3 ^{(9)}	51–5	1–1	
May 19	Texas State	(3)	Easton Stadium • Los Angeles, CA	W 14–1 ^{(5)}	52–5	2–1
May 20	Cal State Fullerton	(3)	Easton Stadium • Los Angeles, CA	W 3–0	53–5	3–1
May 20	Cal State Fullerton	(3)	Easton Stadium • Los Angeles, CA	W 6–4	54–5	4–1

NCAA Los Angeles Super Regional
Date	Opponent	Seed	Site/stadium	Score	Overall record	SR record
May 24	Arizona	(3)	Easton Stadium • Los Angeles, CA	W 7–1	55–5	1–0
May 25	Arizona	(3)	Easton Stadium • Los Angeles, CA	W 3–2	56–5	2–0

NCAA Women's College World Series
Date	Opponent	Seed	Site/stadium	Score	Overall record	WCWS Record
May 31	(6) Florida State	(3)	USA Softball Hall of Fame Stadium • Oklahoma City, OK	W 7–4	57–5	1–0
June 1	(2) Florida	(3)	USA Softball Hall of Fame Stadium • Oklahoma City, OK	W 6–5	58–5	2–0
June 3	(6) Florida State	(3)	USA Softball Hall of Fame Stadium • Oklahoma City, OK	L 1–3	58–6	2–1
June 3	(6) Florida State	(3)	USA Softball Hall of Fame Stadium • Oklahoma City, OK	L 6–12	58–7	2–2
