= 2018 Washington Huskies softball team =

American college softball season

2018 Washington Huskies softball

NCAA Seattle Regional champion NCAA Seattle Super Regional champion

Women's College World Series, runner-up
- Conference: Pac-12 Conference
- Record: 52–10 (15–8 Pac-12)
- Head coach: Heather Tarr (14th season)
- Home stadium: Husky Softball Stadium

2018 Pac-12 Conference softball standings
	Conf.				Overall
Team	W		L	PCT	W		L	PCT
No. 6 Oregon ‍†‍‍^{y}	21	–	3	.875	53	–	10	.841
No. 3 UCLA ‍‍‍^{y}	20	–	4	.833	58	–	7	.892
No. 7 Arizona State ‍‍‍^{y}	16	–	8	.667	48	–	13	.787
No. 2 Washington ‍‍‍^{y}	15	–	8	.652	52	–	10	.839
No. 11 Arizona ‍‍‍^{y}	13	–	11	.542	43	–	16	.729
Oregon State ‍‍‍^{y}	9	–	14	.391	30	–	28	.517
California ‍‍‍^{y}	7	–	16	.304	35	–	21	.625
Stanford ‍‍‍	3	–	21	.125	24	–	31	.436
Utah ‍‍‍	2	–	21	.087	20	–	30	.400
† – Conference champion y – Invited to the NCAA tournament As of June 30, 2018; Rankings from NFCA/USA Today

The 2018 Washington Huskies softball team represented the University of Washington in the 2018 NCAA Division I softball season. The Huskies were coached by Heather Tarr, who led her fourteenth season. The Huskies finished with a record of 52–10, and finished fourth in the Pac-12 Conference with a 15–8 record.

The Huskies were invited to the 2018 NCAA Division I Softball Tournament, where they swept the NCAA Seattle Regional and NCAA Seattle Super Regional and then completed a run to the title game of the Women's College World Series where they fell to champion Florida State.

== Personnel ==
=== Roster ===
2018 Washington Huskies roster
Pitchers: 13 - Kristin Cochran - Senior; 14 - Taran Alvelo - Junior; 16 - Gabbie Plain - Freshman; Catchers: 18 - Rachel Ogasawara - Junior; 24 - Emma Helm - Freshman; 47 - Morganne Flores - Junior	Infielders: 3 - Taylor Van Zee - Senior; 5 - Nawai Kaupe - Freshman; 7 - Taryn Atlee - Sophomore; 11 - Brittany Werre - Junior; 22 - Sis Bates - Sophomore; 25 - Kirstyn Thomas - Senior; 31 - Noelle Hee - Freshman	Outfielders: 2 - Trysten Melhart - Senior; 21 - Kelly Burdick - Senior; 32 - Kaija Gibson - Sophomore; 36 - Amirah Milloy - Junior; Utility: 4 - Julia DePonte - Senior; 19 - Morgan Allen - Freshman

=== Coaches ===
2018 Washington Huskies softball coaching staff
- Heather Tarr – Head coach – 14th season
- J. T. D'Amico - Assistant coach - 11th season
- Lance Glasoe – Assistant coach – 8th season
- Whitney Jones - Volunteer assistant coach - 1st season

== Schedule ==
Legend
	Washington win
	Washington loss
*	Non-Conference game

2018 Washington Huskies softball game log
Regular season

February
Date	Opponent	Rank	Site/stadium	Score	Overall record	Pac-10 record
Feb 9	vs Saint Louis*		Petersen Hotels Field at the Louisville Slugger Sports Complex • Peoria, IL (Peterson Hotels Invite)	W 15–3^{5}	1–0	
Feb 9	at Bradley*		Petersen Hotels Field at the Louisville Slugger Sports Complex • Peoria, IL (Peterson Hotels Invite)	W 11–0^{5}	2–0	
Feb 10	vs Miami (OH)*		Petersen Hotels Field at the Louisville Slugger Sports Complex • Peoria, IL (Peterson Hotels Invite)	W 19–0^{5}	3–0	
Feb 10	vs Western Illinois*		Petersen Hotels Field at the Louisville Slugger Sports Complex • Peoria, IL (Peterson Hotels Invite)	W 10–0^{5}	4–0	
Feb 11	at Bradley*		Petersen Hotels Field at the Louisville Slugger Sports Complex • Peoria, IL (Peterson Hotels Invite)	W 15–0^{6}	5–0	
Feb 16	vs Northern Colorado*		Bearkat Softball Complex • Huntsville, TX (Bearkat Softball Complex)	W 8–0^{6}	6–0	
Feb 16	vs Wichita State*		Bearkat Softball Complex • Huntsville, TX (Bearkat Softball Complex)	W 8–0^{5}	7–0	
Feb 17	vs Seton Hall*		Bearkat Softball Complex • Huntsville, TX (Bearkat Softball Complex)	W 10–0	8–0	
Feb 18	at Sam Houston State*		Bearkat Softball Complex • Huntsville, TX (Bearkat Softball Complex)	W 13–1^{5}	9–0	
Feb 18	vs Wichita State*		Bearkat Softball Complex • Huntsville, TX (Bearkat Softball Complex)	W 7–0	10–0	
Feb 19	at Lamar*		Lamar Softball Complex • Beaumont, TX	W 9–1^{5}	11–0	
Feb 19	at Lamar*		Lamar Softball Complex • Beaumont, TX	W 8–0^{6}	12–0	
Feb 21	at Texas*		Red and Charline McCombs Field • Austin, TX	W 2–1	13–0	
Feb 23	vs Notre Dame*		Big League Dreams • Cathedral City, CA (Mary Nutter Classic)	W 8–0	14–0	
Feb 24	vs Texas A&M*		Big League Dreams • Cathedral City, CA (Mary Nutter Classic)	W 4–3^{9}	15–0	
Feb 24	vs Nebraska*		Big League Dreams • Cathedral City, CA (Mary Nutter Classic)	W 4–2	16–0	
Feb 25	vs Wisconsin*		Big League Dreams • Cathedral City, CA (Mary Nutter Classic)	W 4–1	17–0	
Feb 25	vs Long Beach State*		Big League Dreams • Cathedral City, CA (Mary Nutter Classic)	W 4–0	18–0	

March
Date	Opponent	Rank	Site/stadium	Score	Overall record	Pac-10 record
Mar 2	Alabama*		Husky Softball Stadium • Seattle, WA (Husky Classic)	W 8–0^{5}	19–0	
Mar 2	Northwestern*		Husky Softball Stadium • Seattle, WA (Husky Classic)	W 8–2	20–0	
Mar 3	Alabama*		Husky Softball Stadium • Seattle, WA (Husky Classic)	W 4–1	21–0	
Mar 3	BYU*		Husky Softball Stadium • Seattle, WA (Husky Classic)	W 7–4	22–0	
Mar 4	Portland State*		Husky Softball Stadium • Seattle, WA (Husky Classic)	W 4–1	23–0	
Mar 9	vs New Mexico*		Eller Media Stadium • Paradise, NV (Rebel Classic)	W 9–1^{9}	24–0	
Mar 9	at UNLV*		Eller Media Stadium • Paradise, NV (Rebel Classic)	W 8–0	25–0	
Mar 10	vs DePaul*		Eller Media Stadium • Paradise, NV (Rebel Classic)	W 5–2	26–0	
Mar 10	vs New Mexico State*		Eller Media Stadium • Paradise, NV (Rebel Classic)	W 3–2^{10}	27–0	
Mar 14	Bryant*		Husky Softball Stadium • Seattle, WA	W 7–0	28–0	
Mar 17	at Arizona State*		Alberta B. Farrington Softball Stadium • Tempe, AZ	L 0–2	28–1	0–1
Mar 18	at Arizona State		Alberta B. Farrington Softball Stadium • Tempe, AZ	W 7–0	29–1	1–1
Mar 19	at Arizona State		Alberta B. Farrington Softball Stadium • Tempe, AZ	L 0–2	29–2	1–2
Mar 23	Arizona		Husky Softball Stadium • Seattle, WA	W 2–1^{8}	30–2	2–2
Mar 24	Arizona		Husky Softball Stadium • Seattle, WA	W 4–2^{8}	31–2	3–2
Mar 25	Arizona		Husky Softball Stadium • Seattle, WA	W 2–0	32–2	4–2
Mar 29	at Stanford		Boyd & Jill Smith Family Stadium • Stanford, CA	W 8–1	33–2	5–2
Mar 30	at Stanford		Boyd & Jill Smith Family Stadium • Stanford, CA	W 10–0^{6}	34–2	6–2
Mar 31	at Stanford		Boyd & Jill Smith Family Stadium • Stanford, CA	W 9–0	35–2	7–2

April
Date	Opponent	Rank	Site/stadium	Score	Overall record	Pac-10 record
Apr 4	Seattle*		Husky Softball Stadium • Seattle, WA	W 3–1	36–2	
Apr 6	Utah		Husky Softball Stadium • Seattle, WA	W 5–0	37–2	8–2
Apr 7	Utah		Husky Softball Stadium • Seattle, WA	W 12–0	38–2	9–2
Apr 8	Utah		Husky Softball Stadium • Seattle, WA	W 2–1	39–2	10–2
Apr 13	California		Husky Softball Stadium • Seattle, WA	W 3–1	40–2	11–2
Apr 14	California		Husky Softball Stadium • Seattle, WA	W 9–1	41–2	12–2
Apr 20	at UCLA		Easton Stadium • Los Angeles, CA	L 0–3	41–3	12–3
Apr 21	at UCLA		Easton Stadium • Los Angeles, CA	L 2–3	41–4	12–4
Apr 22	at UCLA		Easton Stadium • Los Angeles, CA	L 0–1	41–5	12–5
Apr 27	Oregon		Husky Softball Stadium • Seattle, WA	L 3–5	41–6	12–6
Apr 28	Oregon		Husky Softball Stadium • Seattle, WA	L 2–4	41–7	12–7
Apr 29	Oregon		Husky Softball Stadium • Seattle, WA	L 3–5	41–8	12–8

May
Date	Opponent	Rank	Site/stadium	Score	Overall record	Pac-10 record
May 4	at Oregon State		Oregon State Softball Complex • Corvallis, OR	W 6–1	42–8	13–8
May 5	at Oregon State		Oregon State Softball Complex • Corvallis, OR	W 2–0	43–8	14–8
May 6	at Oregon State		Oregon State Softball Complex • Corvallis, OR	W 5–3	44–8	15–8

Postseason

NCAA Seattle Regional
Date	Opponent	Rank	Site/stadium	Score	Overall record	NCAAT record
May 18	Boise State	(5)	Husky Softball Stadium • Seattle, WA	W 8–0^{5}	45–8	1–0
May 19	Texas	(5)	Husky Softball Stadium • Seattle, WA	W 2–1	46–8	2–0
May 20	Minnesota	(5)	Husky Softball Stadium • Seattle, WA	W 5–2	47–8	3–0

NCAA Seattle Super Regional
Date	Opponent	Rank	Site/stadium	Score	Overall record	NCAAT record
May 25	(12) Alabama	(5)	Husky Softball Stadium • Seattle, WA	W 3–2^{9}	48–8	1–0
May 26	(12) Alabama	(5)	Husky Softball Stadium • Seattle, WA	W 6–0	49–8	2–0

NCAA Women's College World Series
Date	Opponent	Rank (Seed)	Site/stadium	Score	Overall record	WCWS Record
May 31	(4) Oklahoma	(5)	ASA Hall of Fame Stadium • Oklahoma City, OK	W 2–0	50–8	1–0
June 1	(1) Oregon	(5)	ASA Hall of Fame Stadium • Oklahoma City, OK	W 6–2	51–8	2–0
June 3	(4) Oklahoma	(5)	ASA Hall of Fame Stadium • Oklahoma City, OK	W 3–0	52–8	3–0
June 4	(6) Florida State	(5)	ASA Hall of Fame Stadium • Oklahoma City, OK	L 0–1	52–9	3–1
June 5	(6) Florida State	(5)	ASA Hall of Fame Stadium • Oklahoma City, OK	L 3–8	52–10	3–2
