= Brittany Gray (softball) =

American softball player (born 1995)

Current position
- Title: Assistant coach
- Team: Indiana State
- Conference: MVC

Biographical details
- Born: July 25, 1995 (age 31); Greenwood, Indiana, U.S.
- Education: University of Georgia

Playing career
- 2015–2018: Georgia
- Position: Pitcher

Coaching career (HC unless noted)
- 2019: Georgia (GA)
- 2020–2021: Missouri (GA)
- 2022–present: Indiana State (assistant)

Brittany Gray (born July 25, 1995) is an American softball coach and former player. She attended Greenwood High School in Greenwood, Indiana. She later attended the University of Georgia, where she was an All-American pitcher for the Georgia Bulldogs softball team. Gray led the Bulldogs to the 2016 Women's College World Series second round, where they fell to LSU, 4–1. Gray suffered a season ending arm injury in her senior season, forcing her to miss Georgia's run to the 2018 Women's College World Series. Gray was drafted by the Beijing Shougang Eagles of National Pro Fastpitch in the third round of the 2018 NPF Draft. Gray was named an assistant softball coach at Indiana State University on July 28, 2021.
