= 2018 SEC softball tournament =

2018 Southeastern Conference softball tournament
- Teams: 12
- Format: Single-elimination tournament
- Finals site: Mizzou Softball Stadium; Columbia, Missouri
- Champions: Florida (4th title)
- Runner-up: South Carolina (4th title game)
- Winning coach: Tim Walton (4th title)
- MVP: Amanda Lorenz (Florida)
- Television: SECN; ESPN2; ESPNU

2018 Southeastern Conference softball standings
	Conf.				Overall
Team	W		L	PCT	W		L	PCT
No. 4 Florida ‍†‍‡‍^{y}	20	–	4	.833	47	–	8	.855
No. 8 Georgia ‍‍‍	16	–	8	.667	43	–	10	.811
No. 12 South Carolina ‍‍‍	15	–	9	.625	43	–	13	.768
No. 7 Tennessee ‍‍‍	14	–	10	.583	44	–	11	.800
No. 11 LSU ‍‍‍	13	–	10	.565	40	–	13	.755
No. 14 Texas A&M ‍‍‍	13	–	11	.542	40	–	15	.727
No. 18 Arkansas ‍‍‍	12	–	12	.500	37	–	14	.725
No. 13 Alabama ‍‍‍	12	–	12	.500	32	–	17	.653
No. 15 Auburn ‍‍‍	11	–	12	.478	40	–	14	.741
No. 19 Kentucky ‍‍‍	8	–	15	.348	31	–	18	.633
No. 25 Mississippi State ‍‍‍	7	–	17	.292	35	–	20	.636
Ole Miss ‍‍‍	7	–	17	.292	30	–	22	.577
Missouri ‍‍‍	6	–	17	.261	28	–	27	.509
† – Conference champion ‡ – Tournament champion y – Invited to the NCAA tournament As of Mar. 25, 2018; Rankings from NFCA

The 2018 SEC softball tournament was held at Mizzou Softball Stadium on the campus of University of Missouri in Columbia, Missouri from May 9 through May 12, 2018. The tournament winner earned the Southeastern Conference's automatic bid to the 2018 NCAA Division I softball tournament. The Championship game was broadcast on ESPN2 and the semifinals were broadcast on ESPNU, while all other SEC tournament games were live on the SEC Network.

== Tournament ==
1st Round; May 9th SECN
8	Alabama	6
9	Auburn	4
5	LSU	4
12	Ole Miss	1
7	Arkansas	3
10	Kentucky	1
6	Texas A&M	0
11	Mississippi State	2

Quarterfinals; May 10th SECN
1	Florida	5
8	Alabama	2
4	Tennessee	1
5	LSU	0
2	Georgia	3
7	Arkansas	8
3	South Carolina	3
11	Mississippi State	1

Semifinals; May 11th ESPNU
1	Florida	10
4	Tennessee	2
7	Arkansas	1
3	South Carolina	3

Finals; May 12th ESPN2
1	Florida	3
3	South Carolina	1

- Only the top 12 teams are able to participate, therefore, Missouri was not eligible to play.
- Vanderbilt does not sponsor a softball team.

== Schedule ==
Game	Time*	Matchup^{#}	Television	TV Announcers	Radio Announcers	Attendance
First Round – Wednesday, May 9
1	12:00 p.m.	#6 Texas A&M vs. #11 Mississippi State	SEC Network	Adam Amin, Amanda Scarborough, & Laura Rutledge	Jack Condon & Rob Joyce	1,307
2	2:30 p.m.	#7 Arkansas vs. #10 Kentucky	SEC Network	Adam Amin, Amanda Scarborough, & Laura Rutledge	Rob Joyce & Dave Shook	1,307
3	5:00 p.m.	#5 LSU vs. #12 Ole Miss	SEC Network	Beth Mowins, Michele Smith, & Holly Rowe	Dave Shook & Jack Condon	1,527
4	7:30 p.m.	#8 Alabama vs. #9 Auburn	SEC Network	Beth Mowins, Michele Smith, & Holly Rowe	Jack Condon & Rob Joyce	1,527
Quarterfinals – Thursday, May 10
5	12:00 p.m.	#3 South Carolina vs. #11 Mississippi State	SEC Network	Adam Amin, Amanda Scarborough, & Laura Rutledge	Dave Shook & Jack Condon	–
6	2:30 p.m.	#2 Georgia vs. #7 Arkansas	SEC Network	Adam Amin, Amanda Scarborough, & Laura Rutledge	Jack Condon & Rob Joyce	–
7	5:00 p.m.	#4 Tennessee vs. #5 LSU	SEC Network	Beth Mowins, Michele Smith, & Holly Rowe	Rob Joyce & Dave Shook	–
8	7:30 p.m.	#1 Florida vs. #8 Alabama	SEC Network	Beth Mowins, Michele Smith, & Holly Rowe	Dave Shook & Jack Condon	–
Semifinals – Friday, May 11
9	3:00 p.m.	#3 South Carolina vs. #7 Arkansas	ESPNU	Beth Mowins, Michele Smith, Amanda Scarborough, & Laura Rutledge	Rob Joyce & Dave Shook	–
10	5:30 p.m.	#1 Florida vs. #4 Tennessee	ESPNU	Beth Mowins, Michele Smith, Amanda Scarborough, & Laura Rutledge	Dave Shook & Jack Condon	–
Championship – Saturday, May 12
11	8:00 p.m.	#1 Florida vs. #3 South Carolina	ESPN2	Beth Mowins, Michele Smith, Amanda Scarborough, & Laura Rutledge	Jack Condon, Dave Shook, & Rob Joyce	–
*Game times in EDT. # – Rankings denote tournament seed.

== See also ==
- 2018 Alabama Crimson Tide softball team
- 2018 Auburn Tigers softball team
