= 2018 Georgia State Panthers softball team =

American college softball season

2018 Georgia State Panthers softball
- Conference: Sun Belt Conference
- Record: 31-24 (14-11 SBC)
- Head coach: Roger Kincaid
- Home stadium: Robert E. Heck Baseball Complex

2018 Sun Belt Conference softball standings
	Conf.				Overall
Team	W		L	PCT	W		L	PCT
No. 18 Louisiana ‍†‍‍^{y}	21	–	6	.778	41	–	16	.719
No. 25 Texas State ‍‍‡‍^{y}	18	–	5	.783	43	–	16	.729
UT Arlington ‍‍‍	15	–	11	.577	31	–	27	.534
Georgia State ‍‍‍	13	–	12	.520	30	–	25	.545
Troy ‍‍‍	14	–	13	.519	34	–	26	.567
South Alabama ‍‍‍	13	–	13	.500	29	–	27	.518
Georgia Southern ‍‍‍	12	–	15	.444	28	–	25	.528
Louisiana–Monroe ‍‍‍	10	–	17	.370	24	–	29	.453
Coastal Carolina ‍‍‍	9	–	17	.346	26	–	28	.481
Appalachian State ‍‍‍	4	–	20	.167	17	–	35	.327
† – Conference champion ‡ – Tournament champion y – Invited to the NCAA tournament As of February 27, 2019; Rankings from NFCA

The 2018 Georgia State Panthers softball team represented Georgia State University in the 2018 NCAA Division I softball season. The Panthers competed in the Sun Belt Conference and were led by eight-year head coach Roger Kincaid. Georgia State played its home games at the Robert E. Heck Softball Complex in Panthersville, Georgia.

== Roster ==
2017 Georgia State roster
Pitchers: 18 Mallory Parson - Sophomore; 24 Emily Soles - Sophomore; 26 Amanda Chance - Junior; 27 Kinsley Jennings - Senior; 99 Annie Davis - Junior	Catchers: 4 Ivie Drake – Senior; 8 Alyssa Brumelow - Freshman; Infielders: 0 Arden Jobe - Junior; 1 Kirsten McMonigle - Sophomore; 2 Baylee Sexton - Sophomore; 3 Taylor Bradley - Senior; 12 Caitlin Ray - (redshirt) Freshman; 22 Taylor Chadwick - Sophomore; 23 Kristin Hawkins - (redshirt) Junior	Outfielders: 5 Megan Litumbe - (redshirt) Senior; 7 Cassidy Faulk - Senior; 10 Reagan Morgan - Junior; 16 Brenna Skalski - Senior; 20 Alyssa Ward - Freshman; 25 Skylar Mosel - Freshman; 62 Remington Hasty - Junior; 77 Mallory Koepke - Senior

== Schedule ==
2018 Georgia State Panthers softball game log
Regular season
February

#	Date	Opponent	Site/stadium	Score	Overall record	SBC record
1	February 9	#18 Michigan	Tampa, FL	L 0-8	0-1	-
2	February 9	South Florida	Tampa, FL	L 4-5	0-2	-
3	February 10	#2 Florida	Tampa, FL	L 0-11	0-3	-
4	February 10	Illinois State	Tampa, FL	L 6-7	0-4	-
5	February 11	UAB	Tampa, FL	W 15-4	1-4	-
6	February 14	Georgia Tech	Bob Heck Field	W 5-2	2-4	-
7	February 16	Delaware	Auburn, AL	W 2-1	3-4	-
8	February 16	Saint Francis	Auburn, AL	W 10-3	4-4	-
9	February 17	Delaware	Auburn, AL	W 14-2	5-4	-
10	February 17	Saint Francis	Auburn, AL	L 6-7	5-5	-
11	February 18	#13 Auburn	Auburn, AL	L 0-5	5-6	-
12	February 23	Northern Iowa	Tuscaloosa, AL	W 3-1	6-6	-
13	February 23	#10 Alabama	Tuscaloosa, AL	L 1-5	6-7	-
14	February 24	Northern Iowa	Tuscaloosa, AL	9-1	7-7	-
15	February 24	#9 Florida State	Tuscaloosa, AL	0-8	7-8	-
16	February 25	#10 Alabama	Tuscaloosa, AL	Cancelled	-	-

March

#	Date	Opponent	Site/stadium	Score	Overall record	SBC record
17	March 2	UConn	Bob Heck Field	W 2-0	8-8	-
18	March 2	UConn	Bob Heck Field	W 9-7	9-8	-
19	March 3	Detroit	Bob Heck Field	W 14-6	10-8	-
20	March 3	Detroit	Bob Heck Field	W 11-1	11-8	-
21	March 4	DePaul	Bob Heck Field	6-3	12-8	-
22	March 7	Presbyterian	Bob Heck Field	W 3-0	13-8	-
23	March 10	Texas State	Bob Heck Field	L 2-0	13-9	0–1
24	March 10	Texas State	Bob Heck Field	L 5-4	13-10	0–2
25	March 11	Texas State	Bob Heck Field	Cancelled	-	-
26	March 14	Kennesaw State	Kennesaw, GA	L 0-8	13-11	0–2
27	March 17	UT-Arlington	Arlington, TX	W 7-1	14-11	1–2
28	March 17	UT-Arlington	Arlington, TX	L 1-3	14-12	1–3
29	March 18	UT-Arlington	Arlington, TX	L 0-4	14-13	1–4
30	March 24	South Alabama	Mobile, AL	W 6-5	15-13	2–4
31	March 24	South Alabama	Mobile, AL	L 3-10	15-14	2–5
32	March 25	South Alabama	Mobile, AL	L 0-5	15-15	2–6
33	March 28	Georgia Tech	Atlanta, GA	W 3-2	16-15	2–6
34	March 30	Troy	Bob Heck Field	L 1-4	16-16	2–7
35	March 31	Troy	Bob Heck Field	W 3-2	17-16	3–7
36	March 31	Troy	Bob Heck Field	W 6-3	18-16	4–7

April

#	Date	Opponent	Site/stadium	Score	Overall record	SBC record
37	April 4	Mercer	Bob Heck Field	W 14-8	19-16	4–7
38	April 7	#18 Louisiana	Bob Heck Field	L 4-8	19-17	4–8
39	April 7	#18 Louisiana	Bob Heck Field	L 1-12	19-18	4–9
40	April 8	#18 Louisiana	Bob Heck Field	W 7-6	20-18	5–9
41	April 11	#5 Georgia	Athens, GA	L 0-7	20-19	5–9
42	April 14	Appalachian State	Boone, NC	W 4-0	21-19	6–9
43	April 14	Appalachian State	Boone, NC	W 17-5	22-19	7–9
44	April 15	Appalachian State	Boone, NC	W 9-2	23-19	8–9
45	April 18	Kennesaw State	Bob Heck Field	L 3-6	23-20	8–9
46	April 21	Coastal Carolina	Bob Heck Field	W 4-2	24-20	9-9
47	April 21	Coastal Carolina	Bob Heck Field	W 6-3	25-20	10–9
48	April 22	Coastal Carolina	Bob Heck Field	Cancelled	-	-
49	April 28	ULM	Monroe, LA	W 5-4	26-20	11–9
50	April 28	ULM	Monroe, LA	W 6-3	27-20	12–9
51	April 29	ULM	Monroe, LA	L 5-8	27-21	12–10

May

#	Date	Opponent	Site/stadium	Score	Overall record	SBC record
52	May 2	Chattanooga	Bob Heck Field	W 5-4	28-21	13–10
53	May 4	Georgia Southern	Bob Heck Field	W 3-2	29-21	14–10
54	May 5	Georgia Southern	Bob Heck Field	L 5-7	29-22	14–11
55	May 5	Georgia Southern	Bob Heck Field	W 8-0	30-22	15–11

Sun Belt Tournament

#	Date	Opponent	Site/stadium	Score	Overall record	Tournament record
56	May 9	South Alabama	Lafayette, LA	W 8-3	31-22	(1–0)
57	May 10	#21 Louisiana	Lafayette, LA	L 1-2	31-23	(1-1)
56	May 10	South Alabama	Lafayette, LA	L 2-0	31-24	(1–2)
