= 2018 Louisiana Ragin' Cajuns softball team =

American college softball season

2018 Louisiana Ragin' Cajuns softball

Baton Rouge Regionals appearance Sun Belt Conference regular-season champions

Mardi Gras Invitational Champions Louisiana Classics Champions
- Conference: Sun Belt Conference

Ranking
- Coaches: No. 18
- Record: 41-16 (21-6 SBC)
- Head coach: Gerry Glasco (1st season)
- Assistant coaches: Joe Guthrie; Ellen Renefroe Reed
- Home stadium: Lamson Park

2018 Sun Belt Conference softball standings
	Conf.				Overall
Team	W		L	PCT	W		L	PCT
No. 18 Louisiana ‍†‍‍^{y}	21	–	6	.778	41	–	16	.719
No. 25 Texas State ‍‍‡‍^{y}	18	–	5	.783	43	–	16	.729
UT Arlington ‍‍‍	15	–	11	.577	31	–	27	.534
Georgia State ‍‍‍	13	–	12	.520	30	–	25	.545
Troy ‍‍‍	14	–	13	.519	34	–	26	.567
South Alabama ‍‍‍	13	–	13	.500	29	–	27	.518
Georgia Southern ‍‍‍	12	–	15	.444	28	–	25	.528
Louisiana–Monroe ‍‍‍	10	–	17	.370	24	–	29	.453
Coastal Carolina ‍‍‍	9	–	17	.346	26	–	28	.481
Appalachian State ‍‍‍	4	–	20	.167	17	–	35	.327
† – Conference champion ‡ – Tournament champion y – Invited to the NCAA tournament As of February 27, 2019; Rankings from NFCA

The 2018 Louisiana Ragin' Cajuns softball team represented the University of Louisiana at Lafayette in the 2018 NCAA Division I softball season. The Ragin' Cajuns play their home games at Lamson Park and were led by first year head coach Gerry Glasco.

== Preseason ==
=== Sun Belt Conference Coaches Poll ===
The Sun Belt Conference Coaches Poll was released on February 1, 2018. Louisiana was picked to finish second in the Sun Belt Conference behind the Texas State Bobcats softball team with 92 votes and 4 first place votes.

Coaches poll
Predicted finish	Team	Votes (1st place)
1	Texas State	95 (6)
2	Louisiana	92 (4)
3	Georgia State	80
4	South Alabama	72
5	Louisiana-Monroe	46
6	UT Arlington	42
7	Coastal Carolina	38
7	Georgia Southern	38
9	Troy	34
10	Appalachian State	13

=== Preseason All-Sun Belt team ===
- Randi Rupp (TXST, SR, Pitcher)
- Devin Brown (USA, SR, Pitcher)
- Ivie Drake (GSU, SR, Catcher)
- Lexie Comeaux (LA, JR, Catcher)
- Aileen Garcia (UTA, SO, 1st Base)
- Kaleigh Todd (USA, SR, 2nd Base)
- Sandra Mendoza (UTA, SR, 2nd Base)
- Ariel Ortiz (TXST, SR, Shortstop)
- Kristian Foster (USA, SR, Shortstop)
- Alissa Dalton (LA, SO, Shortstop)
- Kara Gremillion (LA, JR, 3rd Base)
- Krista Rude (UTA, JR, Outfield)
- Mekhia Freeman (GASO, SO, Outfield)
- Kelli Martinez (LA, SR, Outfield)
- Megan Litumbe (GSU, R-SR, Designated Pitcher)

== Roster ==
2018 Louisiana Ragin' Cajuns roster
Pitchers: 9 Summer Ellyson - Sophomore; 10 Alison Deville - Junior; 11 Kylee Jo Trahan - Senior; 18 Casey Dixon - Freshman; 28 Carrie Boswell - Freshman; 42 Samantha Bradley - Redshirt Freshman; Catchers: 19 Lexie Comeaux - Junior; 23 Shae Schreckengost - Redshirt Freshman; 25 Caitlin Garcia - Freshman; 34 Miranda Grotenhuis - Junior; Utilities: 3 Jolie Readeaux - Freshman; 40 Kimber Cortemelia - Freshman	Infielders: 7 Alaina Guarino - Sophomore; 8 Kynadi Tipler - Sophomore; 22 Alissa Dalton - Sophomore; 26 Cori McCrary - Junior; 37 Brittany Holland - Sophomore; 39 Kara Gremillion - Junior; 44 Kourtney Gremillion - Redshirt Freshman; Outfielders: 1 Chelsea Lotief - Sophomore; 2 Raina O'Neal - Sophomore; 6 Brittany Rodriguez - Senior; 15 Aeriyl Mass - Sophomore; 23 Casidy Chaumont - Freshman; 30 Kelli Martinez - Senior

=== Coaching staff ===
2018 Louisiana Ragin' Cajuns coaching staff
- Gerry Glasco – Head Coach – 1st year
- Joe Guthrie – Assistant Head Coach – 1st year
- Ellen Renfroe Reed – Assistant Head Coach – 1st year
- Courtnay Foster – Volunteer Assistant Coach – 1st year
- Jon Reed – Director of Operations – 1st year
- Shellie Landry – Manager
- Tyler Thackston – Manager
- Denee Simon – Office Manager

== Schedule and results ==
Legend
	Louisiana win
	Louisiana loss
	Postponement/Cancellation
**Bold**	Louisiana team member

2018 Louisiana Ragin' Cajuns Softball Game Log
Regular season (36-13)

February (11-3)
Date	Opponent	Rank	Site/stadium	Score	Win	Loss	Save	TV	Attendance	Overall record	SBC record
Mardi Gras Classic
Feb. 8	Samford	No. 22	Lamson Park • Lafayette, LA	**W** 7-1	**Dixon** (1-0)	Yantis (0-1)	None	Ragin' Cajuns Digital Network	1,637	1-0	
Feb. 9	Eastern Illinois	No. 22	Lamson Park • Lafayette, LA	**W** 2-1	**Trahan** (1-0)	Rodgers (0-1)	None	Ragin' Cajuns Digital Network		2-0	
Feb. 9	Evansville	No. 22	Lamson Park • Lafayette, LA	**W** 7-1	**Ellyson** (1-0)	Lockhart (0-1)	None	Ragin' Cajuns Digital Network	1,815	3-0	
Feb. 10	Eastern Illinois	No. 22	Broussard Sports Complex • Broussard, LA	**W** 14-10 (9 inn)	**Trahan** (2-0)	Rodgers (0-2)	None	None	1,524	4-0	
Feb. 11	Iowa	No. 22	Broussard Sports Complex • Broussard, LA	**W** 9-0 (5 inn)	**Trahan** (3-0)	Doocy (1-1)	None	None	576	5-0	
Feb. 15	#RV Oregon State	No. 16	Lamson Park • Lafayette, LA	**W** 9-4	**Ellyson** (2-0)	Mazon (1-2)	**Trahan** (1)	CST	1,680	6-0	
Feb. 17	#2 Florida	No. 22	Lamson Park • Lafayette, LA	**L** 0-4	Barnhill (3-0)	**Trahan** (3-1)	None	CST		6-1	
Feb. 17	#2 Florida	No. 22	Lamson Park • Lafayette, LA	**L** 0-9 (6 inn)	Ocasio (4-0)	**Boswell** (0-1)	None	CST	2,572	6-2	
Feb. 18	#2 Florida	No. 22	Lamson Park • Lafayette, LA	**W** 4-3 (11 inn)	**Ellyson** (3-0)	Ocasio (4-1)	None	Ragin' Cajuns Digital Network	2,040	7-2	
Louisiana Classics
Feb. 22	Southeastern Louisiana	No. 15	Lamson Park • Lafayette, LA	**W** 4-0	**Ellyson** (4-0)	Hill (3-1)	None	Ragin' Cajuns Digital Network	1,609	8-2	
Feb. 23	North Florida Ospreys	No. 15	Lamson Park • Lafayette, LA	**W** 8-6	**Dixon** (2-0)	Blourne (2-4)	**Trahan** (2)	Ragin' Cajuns Digital Network	1,657	9-2	
Feb. 24	North Florida	No. 15	Lamson Park • Lafayette, LA	**L** 0-1	Matzko (4-4)	**Ellyson** (4-1)	None	Ragin' Cajuns Digital Network		9-3	
Feb. 24	UMBC	No. 15	Lamson Park • Lafayette, LA	**W** 7-4	**Boswell** (1-1)	Hammett (0-3)	**Dixon** (1)	Ragin' Cajuns Digital Network	2,066	10-3	
Feb. 25	Memphis	No. 15	Lamson Park • Lafayette, LA	**W** 6-3 (11 inn)	**Ellyson** (5-1)	Smith (4-2)	None	Ragin' Cajuns Digital Network	1,646	11-3	

March (12-4)
Date	Opponent	Rank	Site/stadium	Score	Win	Loss	Save	TV	Attendance	Overall record	SBC record
Judi Garman Classic
Mar. 2	vs. No. 23 Michigan	No. 17	Anderson Family Field • Fullerton, CA	**L** 3-6 (11 inn)	Blanco (3-1)	**Ellyson** (5-2)	Beaubien	None		11-4	
Mar. 3	vs. Iowa	No. 17	Anderson Family Field • Fullerton, CA	Cancelled due to lighting issues at Field 2 of Anderson Family Field							
Mar. 3	vs. Michigan State	No. 17	Anderson Family Field • Fullerton, CA	Cancelled due to lighting issues at Field 2 of Anderson Family Field							
Mar. 4	vs. Fresno State	No. 17	Anderson Family Field • Fullerton, CA	**W** 7-2	**Dixon** (3-0)	East (6-5)	None	None		12-4	
Mar. 4	vs. No. 8 Baylor	No. 17	Anderson Family Field • Fullerton, CA	**L** 0-1	Rodoni (6-2)	**Ellyson** (5-3)	None	None		12-5	
Mar. 10	at Coastal Carolina	No. 20	CCU Softball Field • Conway, SC	**W** 4-2	**Boswell** (2-1)	Beasley-Polko (6-5)	None	None		13-5	
Mar. 10	at Coastal Carolina	No. 20	CCU Softball Field • Conway, SC	**L** 2-4	Guillette (8-5)	**Dixon** (3-1)	Beasley-Polko (2)	None	178	13-6	
Mar. 11	at Coastal Carolina	No. 20	CCU Softball Field • Conway, SC	**W** 4-2	**Dixon** (4-1)	Beasley-Polko (6-6)	None	None	218	14-6	
Mar. 15	FIU	No. 20	Lamson Park • Lafayette, LA	**W** 2-0	**Ellyson** (6-3)	Kugelmann (3-6)	None	Ragin' Cajuns Digital Network	1,640	15-6	
Mar. 17	Appalachian State	No. 20	Lamson Park • Lafayette, LA	**W** 5-0	**Ellyson** (7-3)	Longanecker (4-7)	None	Ragin' Cajuns Digital Network		16-6	
Mar. 17	Appalachian State	No. 20	Lamson Park • Lafayette, LA	**W** 8-0 (5 inn)	**Dixon** (5-1)	Kuykendall (2-3)	None	Ragin' Cajuns Digital Network	1,691	17-6	
Mar. 18	Appalachian State	No. 20	Lamson Park • Lafayette, LA	**W** 7-0	**Ellyson** (8-3)	Longanecker (4-8)	None	Ragin' Cajuns Digital Network	1,594	18-6	
Mar. 24	at Troy	No. 21	Troy Softball Complex • Troy, AL	**W** 4-2 (11 inn)	**Ellyson** (9-3)	Willies (7-4)	None	ESPN3		19-6	
Mar. 24	at Troy	No. 21	Troy Softball Complex • Troy, AL	**W** 8-7	**Dixon** (6-1)	Graves (4-6)	None	ESPN3	548	20-6	
Mar. 25	at Troy	No. 21	Troy Softball Complex • Troy, AL	**L** 1-2	Willis (8-4)	**Ellyson** (9-4)	None	ESPN3	518	20-7	
Mar. 30	South Alabama	No. 20	Lamson Park • Lafayette, LA	**W** 7-1	**Ellyson** (10-4)	Brown (11-9)	None	CST		21-7	
Mar. 30	South Alabama	No. 20	Lamson Park • Lafayette, LA	**W** 5-4 (8 inn)	**Ellyson** (11-4)	Reid (7-7)	None	CST	1,906	22-7	
Mar. 30	South Alabama	No. 20	Lamson Park • Lafayette, LA	**W** 3-2	**Ellyson** (12-4)	Reid (7-8)	None	Ragin' Cajuns Digital Network	1,890	23-7	

April (10-6)
Date	Opponent	Rank	Site/stadium	Score	Win	Loss	Save	TV	Attendance	Overall record	SBC record
Apr. 4	at No. 9 Florida State	No. 18	JoAnne Graf Stadium • Tallahassee. Florida	**L** 0-8 (11 inn)	Hanson (17-3)	**Dixon** (6-2)	None	None		23-8	
Apr. 5	at No. 9 Florida State	No. 18	JoAnne Graf Stadium • Tallahassee, FL	**L** 1-7	King (13-3)	**Ellyson** (12-5)	None	None	568	23-9	
Apr. 7	at Georgia State	No. 18	Robert E. Heck Softball Complex • Atlanta, GA	**W** 8-4	**Ellyson** (13-5)	Jennings (8-7)	None	None		24-9	
Apr. 7	at Georgia State	No. 18	Robert E. Heck Softball Complex • Atlanta, GA	**W** 12-1	**Boswell** (3-1)	Chance (6-8)	None	None	313	25-9	
Apr. 8	at Georgia State	No. 18	Robert E. Heck Softball Complex • Atlanta, GA	**L** 6-7 (13 inn)	Jennings (9-7)	**Boswell** (3-2)	None	None	317	25-10	
Apr. 11	at Southeastern Louisiana	No. 21	North Oak Park • Hammond, LA	**W** 13-2 (6 inn)	**Trahan** (4-1)	Hayes (9-7)	None	None	484	26-10	
Apr. 15	No. 24 Texas State	No. 21	Lamson Park • Lafayette, LA	**L** 0-4 (8 inn)	Rupp (19-6)	**Ellyson** (13-6)	None	CST		26-11	
Apr. 15	No. 24 Texas State	No. 21	Lamson Park • Lafayette, LA	**W** 5-1	**Trahan** (5-1)	King (5-1)	None	CST	1,800	27-11	
Apr. 16	No. 24 Texas State	No. 21	Lamson Park • Lafayette, LA	**W** 3-1	**Ellyson** (14-6)	Rupp (19-6)	**Trahan** (3)	Ragin' Cajuns Digital Network	944	28-11	
Apr. 18	at McNeese State	No. 22	Joe Miller Field at Cowgirl Diamond • Lake Charles, LA	**W** 5-3	**Ellyson** (15-6)	Koncir (4-1)	None	None	1,113	29-11	
Apr. 21	Georgia Southern	No. 22	Lamson Park • Lafayette, LA	**W** 2-0	**Ellyson** (16-6)	Waldrep (10-9)	None	Ragin' Cajuns Digital Network	1,514	30-11	
Apr. 21	Georgia Southern	No. 22	Lamson Park • Lafayette, LA	**L** 2-3 (8 inn)	Camp (12-8)	**Dixon** (3-2)	None	Ragin' Cajuns Digital Network	1,520	30-12	
Apr. 22	Georgia Southern	No. 22	Lamson Park • Lafayette, LA	**W** 9-0 (5 inn)	**Ellyson** (17-6)	Ramos (2-4)	None	Ragin' Cajuns Digital Network	1,650	31-12	
Apr. 28	at UT Arlington	No. 22	Allan Saxe Field • Arlington, TX	**L** 3-4	Phillips (15-8)	**Ellyson** (17-7)	None	None		31-13	
Apr. 28	at UT Arlington	No. 22	Allan Saxe Field • Arlington, TX	**W** 6-1	**Dixon** (7-3)	Valencia (9-13)	None	None	404	32-13	
Apr. 29	at UT Arlington	No. 22	Allan Saxe Field • Arlington, TX	**W** 3-2 (12 inn)	**Dixon** (8-3)	Phillips (15-9)	None	None	455	33-13	

May (3-0)
Date	Opponent	Rank	Site/stadium	Score	Win	Loss	Save	TV	Attendance	Overall record	SBC record
May 4	Louisiana-Monroe	No. 21	Lamson Park • Lafayette, LA	**W** 1-0 (14 inn)	**Ellyson** (18-7)	Watts (5-6)	None	Ragin' Cajuns Digital Network	1,716	34-13	
May 5	Louisiana-Monroe	No. 21	Lamson Park • Lafayette, LA	**W** 5-3	**Dixon** (9-3)	Watts (5-7)	**Boswell** (1)	CST		35-13	
May 5	Louisiana-Monroe	No. 21	Lamson Park • Lafayette, LA	**W** 1-0	**Ellyson** (17-6)	Ramos (2-4)	None	CST	1,902	36-13	

Post-Season (5-3)

SBC tournament (2-1)
Date	Opponent	Seed/rank	Site/stadium	Score	Win	Loss	Save	TV	Attendance	Overall record	SBC record
May 10	vs. Georgia State	No. 21	Lamson Park • Lafayette, LA	**W** 2-1	**Ellyson** (20-7)	Chance (12-9)	None	ESPN+	1,087	37-13	
May 11	vs. No. 23 Texas State	No. 21	Lamson Park • Lafayette, LA	**W** 1-0	**Ellyson** (21-7)	Rupp (26-10)	None	ESPN+	1,194	38-13	
May 12	vs. No. 23 Texas State	No. 21	Lamson Park • Lafayette, LA	**L** 2-5	Rupp (27-10)	**Ellyson** (21-8)	None	ESPN+	1,425	38-14	

NCAA tournament (3-2)
Date	Opponent	Seed/rank	Site/stadium	Score	Win	Loss	Save	TV	Attendance	Overall record	SBC record
Baton Rouge Regionals
May 18	vs. RV Houston	No. 21	Tiger Park • Baton Rouge, LA	**L** 0-1	Heebner (26-9)	**Ellyson** (21-9)	None	ESPN3		38-15	
May 19	vs. Fordham	No. 21	Tiger Park • Baton Rouge, LA	**W** 15-3 (5 inn)	**Trahan** (6-1)	Rauch (14-3)	None	ESPN3		39-15	
May 19	vs. RV Houston	No. 21	Tiger Park • Baton Rouge, LA	**W** 7-2	**Ellyson** (22-9)	Melancon (6-9)	None	ESPN3	1,139	40-15	
May 20	vs. No. 11 LSU	No. 21	Tiger Park • Baton Rouge, LA	**W** 5-4 (10 inn)	**Ellyson** (23-9)	Walljasper (17-6)	None	ESPN3	1,566	41-15	
May 20	vs. No. 11 LSU	No. 21	Tiger Park • Baton Rouge, LA	**L** 1-3	Walljasper (18-6)	**Ellyson** (23-10)	None	ESPN3		41-16	

Schedule source:

== Baton Rouge Regional ==
Baton Rouge Regional Teams
(1) LSU Tigers	(2) Louisiana Ragin' Cajuns	(3) Houston Cougars	(4) Fordham Rams

First Round
11	LSU	9
Fordham	0
Houston	1
Louisiana	0
Lower round 1
Fordham	3
Louisiana	15

Semi-Finals
11	LSU	1
Houston	0
Lower final
Houston	2
Louisiana	7

Finals
11	LSU	4	3
Louisiana	5	1
