= Glenn Field =

Sports venue in Atlanta, Georgia

- Interactive map of Glenn Field
- Location: Mecaslin St, Atlanta, GA 30318
- Coordinates: 33°47′16″N 84°24′02″W
- Owner: Georgia Institute of Technology
- Capacity: 500
- Field size: Left field - 190 feet (57.9 m); Center field - 220 feet (67.1 m); Right field - 190 feet (57.9 m)

Construction
- Opened: March 3, 1987
- Closed: 2008
- Demolished: 2013

Tenant
- Georgia Tech Yellow Jackets (1987 - 2008)

Glenn Field was the former home field for the Georgia Tech Yellow Jackets fast pitch softball team located in Midtown Atlanta, Georgia. Glenn Field was built in 1987 and had a capacity of 500 spectators. Glenn Field was one of the two Tech sports facilities off campus being located adjacent to Atlantic Station. The field dimensions were 190 feet to left and right fields and 220 feet to center field. Tech had a 247-153-2 record at Glenn (.614 winning percentage). Tech’s current field is Shirley C. Mewborn field, built in 2009.

== History ==
The first game played on Glenn Field was a 7–4 loss to Samford University on March 3, 1987. Tech hosted thirteen additional games that season posting a 4–10 record at home and a 6–27 record overall. The first winning season at home was in 1989 where Tech posted a 12-8-1 record. The greatest season in Glenn Field history was in 2002 when Tech won the ACC Tournament. Tech went 20–2 at Glenn Field in 2002.

Tech played its first game against archrival University of Georgia in 1997. The game was played at Georgia State University and resulted in a Bulldog win. Tech played UGA again in 1998 at Glenn Field marking the first home field advantage in the heated series. The first home win against the Dogs came in 2000 in the second game of a March 2 doubleheader.

The most played opponent at Glenn Field is Georgia Southern University. Tech holds a 20–5 record over the Eagles at Glenn Field. Glenn Field has also been host to Georgia State University, Mercer, GC&SU, Kennesaw State, and West Georgia. Tech holds a commanding 41–13 record over these instate schools while playing at Glenn Field.

In June 2007, Georgia Tech Athletic Director Dan Radakovich announced that Glenn Field would cease to be the Yellow Jackets home field. A new facility being constructed adjacent to historic O'Keefe High School was completed February 2009, supplanting the twenty-year-old Glenn Field. Newborn Field holds 1,000 spectators and made it possible for the Jackets to host postseason games with the presence of stadium lights.
