= Heather Tarr =

American softball coach (born 1974)

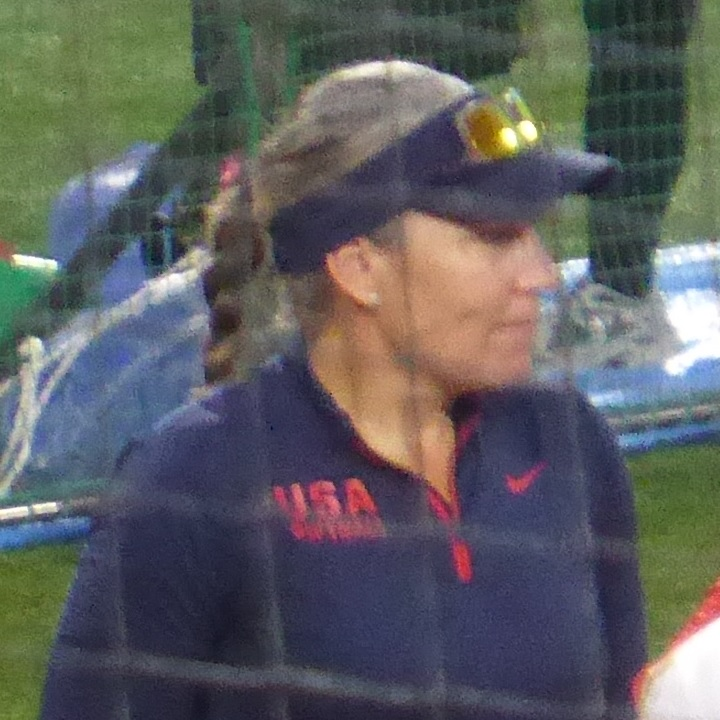

Current position
- Title: Head coach
- Team: Washington
- Conference: Big Ten Conference
- Record: 853–326–1 (.723)

Biographical details
- Born: October 5, 1974 (age 52); Kirkland, Washington, U.S.

Playing career
- 1994–1997: Washington
- 1997–1998: Tampa Bay FireStix
- Position: Infielder

Coaching career (HC unless noted)
- 1998: Washington (student asst.)
- 1999–2003: Pacific (asst.)
- 2004: Pacific (AHC)
- 2005–present: Washington

National softball
- 2019–2020: Team USA Women's Softball (asst.)
- 2022–2024: Team USA Women's Softball

Head coaching record
- Overall: 853–326–1 (.723)
- Tournaments: NCAA Division I: 76–35 (.685)

Accomplishments and honors

Championships
- As player: Pac-10 (1996); As head coach: Women's College World Series (2009); 2× Pac-10/12 (2010, 2019)

Awards
- As player: 3× honorable mention All-Pac-10 (1995–1997); Second-team NFCA All-Pacific Region (1997); As assistant coach: NFCA West Region Coaching Staff of the Year (2001); As head coach: Pac-10 Coach of the Year (2010); NFCA Pacific Regional Coaching Staff of the Year (2019)

Heather Robyn Tarr (born October 5, 1974) is an American former collegiate softball third baseman, and is the current head coach at Washington. Tarr become one of five coaches/athletes to have played and coached in the Women's College World Series, playing in the 1996 Women's College World Series as well the 1997 Women's College World Series, and coaching the Huskies at the 2009 Women's College World Series. She was the first coach to win a title with her alma mater when the Huskies won the national championship in 2009. Tarr has also assisted Team USA and helped coach the team at the 2020 Summer Olympics.

Tarr is the winningest coach of any sport in University of Washington history. Her record as of May 2026 is 744-283-1.

== Early life and education ==
Born in Kirkland, Washington, Tarr graduated from Redmond High School and played at infielder on the Washington Huskies softball team from 1994 to 1997 while attending the University of Washington. Playing a total of 244 games at Washington, Tarr was an honorable mention all-Pac-10 honoree from 1995 to 1997 and second-team NFCA All-Pacific Region honoree in 1997. As a senior in 1997, Tarr batted .283 with 53 hits and 32 RBI.

== Professional softball career ==
Tarr played professionally with the Tampa Bay FireStix of the Women's Professional Softball League in 1997 and 1998, playing 64 games with 26 hits and 10 RBI.

== Coaching career ==
=== College assistant (1998–2004) ===
In 1998, Tarr was an undergraduate assistant at Washington while completing her geography degree.

From 1999 to 2004, Tarr was an assistant coach for the University of the Pacific Tigers in Stockton, California under head coach Brian Kolze. She later became associate head coach during the 2004 season. With Tarr on staff, UOP went 232–124 and 90–44 mark in the Big West Conference. In 2001, Tarr and Pacific head coach Brian Kolze were named 2001 NFCA West Region Coaching Staff of the Year after guiding the Tigers to within one win of the Women's College World Series and finished the year at No. 18 in the final national ranking.

=== Washington (2005–present) ===
After the 2004 season UOP as an assistant, Heather Tarr was named head coach of the Washington Huskies softball team. In her first UE season, Tarr led the Huskies to a 35–22 overall record and to the NCAA Super Regionals where they lost to eventual national champion Michigan. In 2009, Tarr led Washington 51–12 overall record and won the 2009 Women's College World Series, Washington's first title in program history. She became the first coach to win a title with her alma mater.

As of May 2026, Tarr is the winningest coach of any sport in University of Washington history. Her record is currently 744-283-1 and she has coached UW Softball in seven Women’s College World Series appearances.

Tarr led the Huskies to a runner-up finish in the 2018 Women's College World Series. Tarr has been a mentor to athletes Danielle Lawrie, Ali Aguilar and Taran Alvelo and is head coach of the U.S. Under-19 National Softball Team.

=== Team USA ===
Tarr was named as an assistant coach for the United States women's softball team in 2019. On October 25, 2021, Tarr became the head coach for Team USA. As head coach of Team USA, Tarr led the team to win a gold medal in 2022 at the World Games. As assistant coach, she led the team to a silver medal win at the WBSC Softball World Cup and another silver medal at the 2020 Olympic Games.

== Statistics ==
Washington Huskies
YEAR	G	AB	R	H	BA	RBI	HR	3B	2B	TB	SLG	BB	SO	SB	SBA
1994	35	67	10	13	.194	11	0	0	5	18	.268%	9	12	2	2
1995	73	193	35	61	.316	38	0	2	8	73	.378%	18	14	6	6
1996	68	174	34	54	.310	23	3	0	2	65	.373%	21	21	5	6
1997	69	187	31	53	.283	32	1	1	11	69	.369%	32	27	21	25
TOTALS	245	621	110	181	.291	104	4	4	26	225	.362%	80	74	34	39

== Head coaching record ==
Record table
Season	Team	Overall	Conference	Standing	Postseason
Washington Huskies (Pacific-10/Pac-12 Conference) (2005–2024)
2005	Washington	35–22	10–11	6th	NCAA Super Regional
2006	Washington	35–25	6–15	7th	NCAA Super Regional
2007	Washington	42–19	12–9	T–3rd	Women's College World Series
2008	Washington	30–25–1	7–14	T–5th	NCAA Regional
2009	Washington	51–12	14–7	2nd	WCWS Champions
2010	Washington	50–9	17–4	1st	Women's College World Series
2011	Washington	37–16	9–12	T–6th	NCAA Super Regional
2012	Washington	39–19	7–16	8th	NCAA Super Regional
2013	Washington	45–17	12–5	T–2nd	Women's College World Series
2014	Washington	37–15	13–9	4th	NCAA Super Regional
2015	Washington	42–17	11–11	6th	NCAA Regional
2016	Washington	39–15	16–8	3rd	NCAA Super Regional
2017	Washington	50–14	16–8	3rd	Women's College World Series
2018	Washington	52–10	15–8	4th	WCWS Runners-Up
2019	Washington	52–9	20–4	T–1st	Women's College World Series
2020	Washington	23–2	0–0		Season cancelled due to COVID-19 pandemic
2021	Washington	45–14	18–5	2nd	NCAA Super Regional
2022	Washington	38–17	14–10	3rd	NCAA Regional
2023	Washington	41–13	16–8	2nd	Women's College World Series
2024	Washington	32–15	13–10	3rd	NCAA Regional
Washington Huskies (Big Ten Conference) (2025–present)
2025	Washington	35–19	12–9	7th	NCAA Regional
Washington:		853–326–1 (.723)	258–183 (.585)		
Total:		853–326–1 (.723)			
National champion Postseason invitational champion Conference regular season champion Conference regular season and conference tournament champion Division regular season champion Division regular season and conference tournament champion Conference tournament champion

== Other ==
In 2019 she was inducted into the Little League Hall of Excellence.
