= 2018 Alabama Crimson Tide softball team =

American college softball season

2018 Alabama Crimson Tide softball
- Conference: Southeastern Conference
- West
- Record: 36–20 (12–12 SEC)
- Head coach: Patrick Murphy
- Assistant coach: Alyson Habetz
- Pitching coach: Stephanie VanBrakle
- Home stadium: Rhoads Stadium

2018 Southeastern Conference softball standings
	Conf.				Overall
Team	W		L	PCT	W		L	PCT
No. 4 Florida ‍†‍‡‍^{y}	20	–	4	.833	47	–	8	.855
No. 8 Georgia ‍‍‍	16	–	8	.667	43	–	10	.811
No. 12 South Carolina ‍‍‍	15	–	9	.625	43	–	13	.768
No. 7 Tennessee ‍‍‍	14	–	10	.583	44	–	11	.800
No. 11 LSU ‍‍‍	13	–	10	.565	40	–	13	.755
No. 14 Texas A&M ‍‍‍	13	–	11	.542	40	–	15	.727
No. 18 Arkansas ‍‍‍	12	–	12	.500	37	–	14	.725
No. 13 Alabama ‍‍‍	12	–	12	.500	32	–	17	.653
No. 15 Auburn ‍‍‍	11	–	12	.478	40	–	14	.741
No. 19 Kentucky ‍‍‍	8	–	15	.348	31	–	18	.633
No. 25 Mississippi State ‍‍‍	7	–	17	.292	35	–	20	.636
Ole Miss ‍‍‍	7	–	17	.292	30	–	22	.577
Missouri ‍‍‍	6	–	17	.261	28	–	27	.509
† – Conference champion ‡ – Tournament champion y – Invited to the NCAA tournament As of Mar. 25, 2018; Rankings from NFCA

The 2018 Alabama Crimson Tide softball team was an American softball team that represented the University of Alabama for the 2018 NCAA softball season. The Crimson Tide played their home games at Rhoads Stadium. After losing in the 2017 NCAA Super Regionals, the 2018 team looked to make the postseason for the 20th straight year, and the Women's College World Series for twelfth time. This season represented the 22nd season of softball in the school's history.

== Personnel ==
=== Roster ===
2018 Alabama Crimson Tide roster
Pitchers: 21 Courtney Gettins – Junior; 24 Madison Preston – Freshman; 27 Alexis Osorio – Senior; Outfielders: 1 Elissa Brown– Sophomore; 4 Rachel Bobo – Senior; 7 Merris Schroder – Junior; 8 KB Sides – Freshman; 12 Kaylee Tow – Freshman; 15 Gabby Callaway – Sophomore; Catchers: 20 Carrigan Fain – Senior; 54 Reagan Dykes – Junior	Infielders: 00 Maddie Morgan – Freshman; 2 Demi Turner – Senior; 3 Peyton Grantham – Senior; 5 Kyra Lockhart – Freshman; 6 Sydney Booker – Senior; 33 Claire Jenkins – Sophomore; Utility: 16 Bailey Hemphill – Sophomore; 34 Caroline Hardy – Junior

2018 Alabama Crimson Tide Softball Roster

=== Coaching staff ===
2018 Alabama Crimson Tide softball coaching staff
- Patrick Murphy – Head coach – 20th year
- Alyson Habetz – Associate head coach, hitting coach – 20th year
- Stephanie VanBrakle Prothro – Assistant coach, pitching coach – 7th year
- Brynne Dordel – Volunteer assistant coach – 1st year
- Kate Harris – Director of operations – 8th year

== Schedule ==
Date	Time	Opponent	Rank^{#}	Site	Result	Attendance	Winning Pitcher	Losing Pitcher
February 8*	6:00 PM	South Alabama	#11	Jaguar Field • Mobile, AL	W 1–0	1,152	A. Osorio	D. Brown
Sand Dollar Classic
February 9*	11:00 AM	Penn State	#11	Gulf Shores Sportplex • Gulf Shores, AL	W 10–0^{(5)}	–	M. Preston	J. Cummings
February 9*	1:00 PM	Lamar	#11	Gulf Shores Sportplex • Gulf Shores, AL	W 13–0^{(5)}	–	C. Getting	A. Cisneros
February 10*	12:00 PM	Virginia Tech	#11	Gulf Shores Sportplex • Gulf Shores, AL	Canceled	–	–	–
February 11*	3:00 PM	Florida A&M	#11	Gulf Shores Sportplex • Gulf Shores, AL	Canceled	–	–	–
Black and Gold Tournament
February 16*	1:00 PM	Southern Miss	#9	SM Softball Complex • Hattiesburg, MS	W 11–1^{(6)}	1,054	A. Osorio	J. Johnson
February 17*	1:00 PM	#24 McNeese State	#9	SM Softball Complex • Hattiesburg, MS	W 11–1^{(5)}	–	C. Gettins	A. Flores
February 17*	4:00 PM	Miss Valley St.	#9	SM Softball Complex • Hattiesburg, MS	W 11–0^{(5)}	–	M. Preston	A. Salazar
February 18*	1:00 PM	#11 Baylor	#9	SM Softball Complex • Hattiesburg, MS	L 1–2	–	M. Rodoni	A. Osorio
Easton Bama Bash
February 23*	4:00 PM	Georgia St.	#10	Rhoads Stadium • Tuscaloosa, AL	W 5–1	–	M. Preston	M. Parson
February 23*	6:00 PM	#9 Florida St.	#10	Rhoads Stadium • Tuscaloosa, AL	W 3–0	2,971	A. Osorio	K. Hanson
February 24*	1:30 PM	Northern Iowa	#10	Rhoads Stadium • Tuscaloosa, AL	W 11–3^{(6)}	–	C. Gettins	J. Spencer
February 24*	4:00 PM	#9 Florida St.	#10	Rhoads Stadium • Tuscaloosa, AL	L 1–3	2,907	M. King	M. Preston
February 25*	1:30 PM	Georgia St.	#10	Rhoads Stadium • Tuscaloosa, AL	Canceled	–	–	–
February 27*	6:00 PM	UAB	#11	Mary Bowers Field • Birmingham, AL	W 4–0	821	C. Gettins	E. Katchel
Husky Classic
March 2*	1:15 PM	BYU	#11	Husky Softball Stadium • Seattle, WA	W 7–6^{(8)}	–	C. Gettins	A. Paulson
March 2*	5:45 PM	#1 Washington	#11	Husky Softball Stadium • Seattle, WA	L 0–8^{(8)}	–	G. Pain	A. Osorio
March 3*	4:45 PM	Portland St.	#11	Husky Softball Stadium • Seattle, WA	W 3–0	–	M. Preston	E. Detamore
March 3*	7:00 PM	#1 Washington	#11	Husky Softball Stadium • Seattle, WA	L 1–4	–	G. Pain	C. Gettins
March 4*	12:00 PM	Northwestern	#11	Husky Softball Stadium • Seattle, WA	L 0–4	–	M. Newport	A. Osorio
Easton Crimson Classic
March 9*	4:00 PM	Boston College	#13	Rhoads Stadium • Tuscaloosa, AL	W 5–0	–	A. Osorio	A. Frei
March 9*	6:00 PM	Fordham	#13	Rhoads Stadium • Tuscaloosa, AL	W 4–3	2,501	C. Gettins	L. Quense
March 10*	1:30 PM	Boston College	#13	Rhoads Stadium • Tuscaloosa, AL	W 6–3	–	M. Preston	J. Dreswick
March 10*	4:00 PM	Fordham	#13	Rhoads Stadium • Tuscaloosa, AL	W 7–2	2,525	A. Osorio	M. Aughinbaugh
March 11*	1:30 PM	Samford	#13	Rhoads Stadium • Tuscaloosa, AL	W 1–0	2,445	C. Gettins	T. DeCelles
March 14*	5:00 PM	Georgia Tech	#12	Glenn Field • Atlanta, GA	W 3–1	1,200	M. Preston	E. Anderson
March 16	6:00 PM	#14 Auburn	#12	Moore Field • Auburn, AL	W 2–0	1,965	A. Osorio	K. Carlson
March 17*	7:00 PM	#14 Auburn	#12	Moore Field • Auburn, AL	L 1–3	2,128	M. Martin	M. Preston
March 18	5:00 PM	#14 Auburn	#12	Moore Field • Auburn, AL	L 1–2	2,031	K. Carlson	C. Gettins
March 20*	6:00 PM	UAB	#15	Rhoads Stadium • Tuscaloosa, AL	W 10–5	2,407	C. Gettins	E. Kachel
March 23	6:30 PM	Ole Miss	#15	Rhoads Stadium • Tuscaloosa, AL	W 13–1^{(5)}	2,929	C. Gettins	A. Tillmann
March 24	2:00 PM	Ole Miss	#15	Rhoads Stadium • Tuscaloosa, AL	L 10–3	3,535	K. Lee	M. Preston
March 25	1:30 PM	Ole Miss	#15	Rhoads Stadium • Tuscaloosa, AL	W 3–2	3,104	C. Gettins	K. Lee
March 30	5:00 PM	#19 Kentucky	#16	Cropp Stadium • Lexington, KY	W 9–0	–	A. Osorio	A. Humes
March 31	4:00 PM	#19 Kentucky	#16	Cropp Stadium • Lexington, KY	L 6–11	2,425	G. Baalman	M. Preston
April 1	12:00 PM	#19 Kentucky	#16	Cropp Stadium • Lexington, KY	W 9–3	1,034	A. Osorio	A. Humes
April 7	12:00 PM	#4 Florida	#15	Rhoads Stadium • Tuscaloosa, AL	L –	–	–	–
April 8	2:00 PM	#4 Florida	#15	Rhoads Stadium • Tuscaloosa, AL	W –	–	–	–
April 9	6:00 PM	#4 Florida	#15	Rhoads Stadium • Tuscaloosa, AL	L –	–	–	–
April 13	6:00 PM	Arkansas		Bogle Park • Fayetteville, AR	W –	–	–	–
April 14	11:00 AM	Arkansas		Bogle Park • Fayetteville, AR	L –	–	–	–
April 15	1:00 PM	Arkansas		Bogle Park • Fayetteville, AR	L –	–	–	–
April 18*	6:00 PM	Southern Miss		Rhoads Stadium • Tuscaloosa, AL	W –	–	–	–
April 21	4:30 PM	Tennessee		Rhoads Stadium • Tuscaloosa, AL	L –	–	–	–
April 22	2:00 PM	Tennessee		Rhoads Stadium • Tuscaloosa, AL	L –	–	–	–
April 23	6:00 PM	Tennessee		Rhoads Stadium • Tuscaloosa, AL	W –	–	–	–
April 27	5:00 PM	Georgia		Turner Stadium • Athens, GA	L –	–	–	–
April 28	5:00 PM	Georgia		Turner Stadium • Athens, GA	L –	–	–	–
April 29	1:00 PM	Georgia		Turner Stadium • Athens, GA	W –	–	–	–
May 4*	7:00 PM	Texas A&M		Rhoads Stadium • Tuscaloosa, AL	W –	–	–	–
May 5	12:00 PM	Texas A&M		Rhoads Stadium • Tuscaloosa, AL	W –	–	–	–
May 6	1:30 PM	Texas A&M		Rhoads Stadium • Tuscaloosa, AL	W –	–	–	–
*Non-Conference Game. ^{#}Rankings from NFCA released prior to game.All times are in Central Time Zone.

== Honors and awards ==
- None

== Ranking movement ==
Poll	Pre	Wk 1	Wk 2	Wk 3	Wk 4	Wk 5	Wk 6	Wk 7	Wk 8	Wk 9	Wk 10	Wk 11	Wk 12	Wk 13	Wk 14	Final
NFCA	11	9	10	11	13	12	15	16	15							
USA Softball	10	9	13	11	13	15	16	16	15							

== See also ==
- 2018 Alabama Crimson Tide baseball team
