= 2018 Auburn Tigers softball team =

American college softball season

2018 Auburn Tigers softball
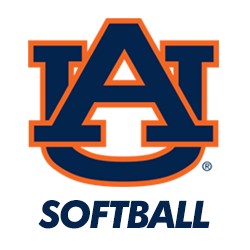
- Conference: Southeastern Conference
- West
- Record: 7–0 (0–0 SEC)
- Head coach: Mickey Dean
- Assistant coach: Annie Smith; Eddy Ketelhut
- Home stadium: Jane B. Moore Field

2018 Southeastern Conference softball standings
	Conf.				Overall
Team	W		L	PCT	W		L	PCT
No. 4 Florida ‍†‍‡‍^{y}	20	–	4	.833	47	–	8	.855
No. 8 Georgia ‍‍‍	16	–	8	.667	43	–	10	.811
No. 12 South Carolina ‍‍‍	15	–	9	.625	43	–	13	.768
No. 7 Tennessee ‍‍‍	14	–	10	.583	44	–	11	.800
No. 11 LSU ‍‍‍	13	–	10	.565	40	–	13	.755
No. 14 Texas A&M ‍‍‍	13	–	11	.542	40	–	15	.727
No. 18 Arkansas ‍‍‍	12	–	12	.500	37	–	14	.725
No. 13 Alabama ‍‍‍	12	–	12	.500	32	–	17	.653
No. 15 Auburn ‍‍‍	11	–	12	.478	40	–	14	.741
No. 19 Kentucky ‍‍‍	8	–	15	.348	31	–	18	.633
No. 25 Mississippi State ‍‍‍	7	–	17	.292	35	–	20	.636
Ole Miss ‍‍‍	7	–	17	.292	30	–	22	.577
Missouri ‍‍‍	6	–	17	.261	28	–	27	.509
† – Conference champion ‡ – Tournament champion y – Invited to the NCAA tournament As of Mar. 25, 2018; Rankings from NFCA

The 2018 Auburn Tigers softball team was an American softball team that represented Auburn University for the 2018 NCAA softball season. The Auburn Tigers played their home games at Jane B. Moore Field. The Tigers had a new coach, after former coach Clint Myers resigned his post on August 24, 2017. Mickey Dean was named as head coach on September 14, 2017, after coaching at James Madison University for 5 seasons.

Auburn hopes to improve upon its 49-12 record a year ago that ended in the Super Regionals at the hands of the eventual National Champion Oklahoma Sooners.

The Tigers were voted to finish sixth in the SEC in the Preseason Coaches' Poll, and opened 2018 ranked 13th in the USA Today/NFCA Softball national preseason poll.

== Roster ==
2018 Auburn Softball roster

No.	Name	Pos.	B	T	Ht.	Class	Hometown (high school)
1	KK Crocker	INF	L	R	5'3	2-Sophomore	Tuscaloosa, AL (Hillcrest)
2	Taylon Snow	INF	L	R	5'5	1-Freshman	Chino Hills, CA
3	Dakota Morrow	INF	R	R	5'8	1-Freshman	Tuscaloosa, AL (Hale County)
7	Carmyn Greenwood	OF	L	R	5'8	2-Sophomore	Birmingham, AL (Oak Mountain)
8	Brittany Maresette	OF	L	R	5'4	2-Sophomore	Snellville, GA (Archer)
9	Tannon Snow	INF	R	R	5'7	2-RS-Sophomore	Chino Hills, CA
11	Casey McCrackin	INF	R	R	5'9	3- Junior	Cantonment, FL (J.M. Tate)
13	Chardonnay Harris	P (L)	L	L	5'10	1-Freshman	Oak Park, IL (Oak Park/River Forest)
14	Ashlee Swindle	P (R)	R	R	5'6	2-Sophomore	Jasper, AL (Curry)
15	Bree Fornis	OF	R	R	5'4	3-Junior	Tuscaloosa, AL (Hillcrest)
16	Kaylee Carlson	P (R)	R	R	5'10	4-Senior	Garden Grove, CA (Pacifica)
17	Morgan Podany	OF	R	R	5'4	3-Junior	Ponte Vedra Beach, FL
18	Justus Perry	INF	R	R	5'9	2-Sophomore	Prior Lake, MN
19	Abby Tissier	C	R	R	5'8	1-Freshman	Hoover, AL
20	Livy Schiele	OF	L	L	5'3	1-Freshman	Bonita, CA (The Bishop's)
21	Alyssa Rivera	OF	L	R	5'9	2-Sophomore	Eagle Lake, FL (Lake Region)
22	Kara Bilodeau	P (R)	R	R	5'9	1-Freshman	Cumming, GA (South Forsyth)
23	Breanna Gutierrez	C	R	R	5'6	1-RS-Freshman	Buford, GA
24	Kendall Veach	INF/C	R	R	5'9	3-Junior	Selma, AL (Morgan Academy)
27	Victoria Draper	OF	L	R	5'6	4-Senior	Moulton, AL (Lawrence County)
29	Makayla Martin	P (R)	L	R	5'11	3-Junior	San Diego, CA (Scripps Ranch)
32	Makenna Dowell	INF	L	R	5'0	1-Freshman	Suwanee, GA (North Gwinnett)
93	Courtney Shea	C	L	R	5'10	4-Senior	Mountain Brook, AL

=== Coaching staff ===
2017 Auburn Softball Coaches
- Mickey Dean – Head coach – 1st year
- Eddy Ketelhut – Assistant coach – 1st year
- Annie Smith – Assistant coach – 1st year
- Emily Carosone – Volunteer assistant coach – 1st year
- Megan Reynolds – Director of operations
- Lana Meeks – Athletic trainer
- Emily Stone – Manager
- Kenzie Friesen – Graduate assistant
- Macy Jones – Graduate assistant
- Elayna Siebert – Graduate assistant

== Schedule ==
2018 Auburn Tigers Softball Schedule

Date	Time	Opponent	Rank^{#}	Site	Result	Attendance	Winning Pitcher	Losing Pitcher
Plainsman Invite (Auburn, AL)
February 8*	3:00 PM	Marshall	#13	Jane B. Moore Field • Auburn, AL	W 4–0	–	Carlson (1-0)	Tolbert (0-1)
February 8*	5:30 PM	Wichita State	#13	Jane B. Moore Field • Auburn, AL	W 2–0	–	Martin (1-0)	Bailey (0-1)
February 9*	2:00 PM	Tennessee Tech	#13	Jane B. Moore Field • Auburn, AL	W 3–0	–	Carlson (2-0)	Waldrop (0-1)
February 9*	4:30 PM	Furman	#13	Jane B. Moore Field • Auburn, AL	W 2–0	1781	Harris (1-0)	Bert (0-1)
February 10*	2:00 PM	Tennessee Tech	#13	Jane B. Moore Field • Auburn, AL	W 18–0	–	Martin (2-0)	Hughes (0-1)
February 10*	4:30 PM	Furman	#13	Jane B. Moore Field • Auburn, AL	W 9-1	1843	Carlson (3-0)	Guimbarda (0-1)
February 14*	5:00 PM	Troy	#13	Troy Softball Complex • Troy, AL	W 5–0	1482	Carlson (4-0)	Graves (1-1)
Tiger Invite (Auburn, AL)
February 16*	3:00 PM	Delaware	#13	Jane B. Moore Field • Auburn, AL	W 15–0 (5)	–	Martin (3–0)	Piening (0–1)
February 16*	5:30 PM	Saint Francis	#13	Jane B. Moore Field • Auburn, AL	W 4–3	1824	Martin (4-0)	Trahan (2–3)
February 17*	2:00 PM	Maryland	#13	Jane B. Moore Field • Auburn, AL	W 12–1 (5)	–	Carlson (5–0)	Golden (0–1)
February 17*	4:30 PM	Saint Francis	#13	Jane B. Moore Field • Auburn, AL	W 5–0	–	Martin (5–0)	Trahan (2–4)
February 18*	10:30 AM	Maryland	#13	Jane B. Moore Field • Auburn, AL	W 8–0 (5)	–	Martin (6–0)	Golden (1–4)
February 18*	1:00 PM	Georgia State	#13	Jane B. Moore Field • Auburn, AL	W 5–0	1866	Carlson (6–0)	Jennings (3–1)
February 21*	4:30 PM	Cal-State Northridge	#12	Matador Diamond • Northridge, CA		–	–	–
Mary Nutter Classic (Cathedral City, CA)
February 22*	12:00 PM	#26 Notre Dame	#12	Big League Dreams Sports Park • Cathedral City, CA		–	–	–
February 22*	2:30 PM	Wisconsin	#12	Big League Dreams Sports Park • Cathedral City, CA		–	–	–
February 23*	2:30 PM	San Jose State	#12	Big League Dreams Sports Park • Cathedral City, CA		–	–	–
February 24*	2:30 PM	#34 Oregon State	#12	Big League Dreams Sports Park • Cathedral City, CA		–	–	–
February 24*	9:30 PM	#27 Long Beach State	#12	Big League Dreams Sports Park • Cathedral City, CA		–	–	–
Wilson/DeMarini Classic (Auburn, AL)
March 2*	3:00 PM	UNC Wilmington		Jane B. Moore Field • Auburn, AL		–	–	–
March 2*	5:30 PM	Western Carolina		Jane B. Moore Field • Auburn, AL		–	–	–
March 3*	3:00 PM	Western Carolina		Jane B. Moore Field • Auburn, AL		–	–	–
March 3*	5:30 PM	Western Illinois		Jane B. Moore Field • Auburn, AL		–	–	–
March 4*	11:00 AM	Western Illinois		Jane B. Moore Field • Auburn, AL		–	–	–
March 4*	1:30 PM	UNC Wilmington		Jane B. Moore Field • Auburn, AL		–	–	–
March 9	6:00 PM	LSU		Tiger Park • Baton Rouge, LA		–	–	–
March 10	7:30 PM	LSU		Tiger Park • Baton Rouge, LA		–	–	–
March 11	4:00 PM	LSU		Tiger Park • Baton Rouge, LA		–	–	–
March 12*	2:00 PM	Southern Miss		Southern Miss Softball Complex • Hattiesburg, MS		–	–	–
March 13*	4:30 PM	Southern Miss		Southern Miss Softball Complex • Hattiesburg, MS		–	–	–
March 16	6:00 PM	Alabama		Jane B. Moore Field • Auburn, AL		–	–	–
March 17	7:00 PM	Alabama		Jane B. Moore Field • Auburn, AL		–	–	–
March 18	5:00 PM	Alabama		Jane B. Moore Field • Auburn, AL		–	–	–
March 21*	6:00 PM	Alabama State		Jane B. Moore Field • Auburn, AL		–	–	–
March 23	6:00 PM	Kentucky		Jane B. Moore Field • Auburn, AL		–	–	–
March 24	7:00 PM	Kentucky		Jane B. Moore Field • Auburn, AL		–	–	–
March 25	2:00 PM	Kentucky		Jane B. Moore Field • Auburn, AL		–	–	–
March 30	6:00 PM	Ole Miss		Ole Miss Softball Complex • Oxford, MS		–	–	–
March 31	4:00 PM	Ole Miss		Ole Miss Softball Complex • Oxford, MS		–	–	–
April 1	1:00 PM	Ole Miss		Ole Miss Softball Complex • Oxford, MS		–	–	–
April 4*	6:00 PM	Kennessaw State		Jane B. Moore Field • Auburn, AL		–	–	–
April 6	5:30 PM	Tennessee		Jane B. Moore Field • Auburn, AL		–	–	–
April 7	4:00 PM	Tennessee		Jane B. Moore Field • Auburn, AL		–	–	–
April 8	2:00 PM	Tennessee		Jane B. Moore Field • Auburn, AL		–	–	–
April 13	6:30 PM	Missouri		University Field • Columbia, MO		–	–	–
April 14	2:00 PM	Missouri		University Field • Columbia, MO		–	–	–
April 15	12:00 PM	Missouri		University Field • Columbia, MO		–	–	–
April 20	6:00 PM	Arkansas		Jane B. Moore Field • Auburn, AL		–	–	–
April 21	6:00 PM	Arkansas		Jane B. Moore Field • Auburn, AL		–	–	–
April 22	2:00 PM	Arkansas		Jane B. Moore Field • Auburn, AL		–	–	–
April 27	6:30 PM	Texas A&M		Aggie Softball Complex • College Station, TX		–	–	–
April 28	1:00 PM	Texas A&M		Aggie Softball Complex • College Station, TX		–	–	–
April 29	1:00 PM	Texas A&M		Aggie Softball Complex • College Station, TX		–	–	–
May 6*	1:00 PM	Chattanooga		Summit of Softball Complex • Chattanooga, TN		–	–	–
May 6*	3:30 PM	Chattanooga		Summit of Softball Complex • Chattanooga, TN		–	–	–
*Non-Conference Game. ^{#}Rankings from NFCA released prior to game.All times are in Central Time Zone.

== Ranking movement ==
Ranking movements Legend: ██ Increase in ranking ██ Decrease in ranking
	Week															
Poll	Pre	1	2	3	4	5	6	7	8	9	10	11	12	13	14	Final
USA Today / NFCA Coaches	13	13	12	12												
ESPN / USA Softball	14	13	6	12												
