= 2018 NCAA Division I softball tournament =

- Teams: 64
- Finals site: ASA Hall of Fame Stadium; Oklahoma City
- Champions: Florida State (1st title)
- Runner-up: Washington (13 WCWS Appearance)
- Winning coach: Lonni Alameda (1st title)
- MOP: Jessie Warren (Florida State)
- Television: ESPN; ESPN2; ESPN3

The 2018 NCAA Division I softball tournament was held from May 18 through June 6, 2018 as the final part of the 2018 NCAA Division I softball season. Thirty-two teams were awarded automatic bids as champions of their conferences, and the remaining 32 were selected at-large by the NCAA Division I softball selection committee. The tournament culminated with eight teams playing in the 2018 Women's College World Series at ASA Hall of Fame Stadium in Oklahoma City. This was the first year since the 2010 Women's College World Series that neither the Florida Gators nor the Oklahoma Sooners made the Championship Series. The Florida State Seminoles played in their first Women's College World Series Championship Series and became the first ACC team to make the Championship Series. The Washington Huskies made their fourth appearance in the Championship Series.

== Automatic bids ==
The Big West, Mountain West, Pac-12, and West Coast Conference bids were awarded to the regular-season champion. All other conferences have the automatic bid go to the conference tournament winner.

Conference	School	Best finish	Reference
America East	Albany	Regionals (2005, 2006, 2007, 2011, 2014, 2017)	
American	Tulsa	Regionals (2006, 2008, 2009, 2011, 2012, 2013, 2014, 2016, 2017)	
ACC	Florida State	WCWS (1987, 1990, 1991, 1992, 1993, 2002, 2004, 2014, 2016)	
A-10	Fordham	Regionals (2010, 2011, 2013, 2014, 2015, 2016, 2017)	
ASUN	Kennesaw State	1st Appearance	
Big 12	Oklahoma	1st (2000, 2013, 2016, 2017)	
Big East	DePaul	WCWS (1999, 2000, 2005, 2007)	
Big Sky	Sacramento State	Regionals (1993, 1995, 2008)	
Big South	Liberty	Regionals (2002, 2011)	
Big Ten	Minnesota	WCWS (1976, 1978)	
Big West	Cal State Fullerton	1st (1986)	
Colonial	Hofstra	Super Regionals (2012)	
Conference USA	Middle Tennessee	Regionals (2000)	
Horizon League	UIC	WCWS (1994)	
Ivy League	Harvard	Regionals (2007, 2011, 2012)	
MAC	Ohio	Regionals (2014)	
MAAC	Monmouth	1st Appearance	
MEAC	Bethune–Cookman	Super Regionals (2005)	
MVC	Drake	Regionals (2008)	
Mountain West	Boise State	1st Appearance	
Northeastern	Saint Francis (PA)	Regionals (2017)	
OVC	Jacksonville State	Super Regionals (2009)	
Pac-12	Oregon	3rd (2014, 2017)	
Patriot League	Boston University	Regionals (1996, 2002, 2003, 2009, 2010, 2012, 2014, 2016)	
SEC	Florida	1st (2014, 2015)	
SoCon	UNCG	Regionals (1997)	
Southland	McNeese State	Regionals (1994, 2005, 2010, 2016, 2017)	
SWAC	Prairie View A&M	1st Appearance	
Summit League	North Dakota State	Super Regionals (2009)	
Sun Belt	Texas State	Regionals (1999, 2001, 2003, 2009, 2011, 2012, 2016, 2017)	
WAC	New Mexico State	Regionals (2011, 2015, 2017)	
WCC	BYU	Super Regionals (2010)	

== National seeds ==
16 National Seeds were announced on the Selection Show Sunday, May 13 at 10 p.m. EDT on ESPN2. The 16 national seeds host the Regionals. Teams in italics advanced to Super Regionals. Teams in bold advance to Women's College World Series.

**1. Oregon** (47–7)
**2. Florida** (50–8)
**3. UCLA** (50–4)
**4. Oklahoma** (50–3)
**5. Washington** (44–8)
**6. Florida State** (47–10)
**7. Georgia** (43–11)
**8. Arizona State** (43–11)

9. South Carolina (45–14)
10. Tennessee (45–12)
11. LSU (41–14)
12. Alabama (33–18)
13. Arkansas (39–15)
14. Arizona (40–14)
15. Texas A&M (40–16)
16. Kentucky (31–19)

== Regionals and Super Regionals ==
The Regionals took place May 17–20, 2018. One regional- Eugene, Oregon, took place May 17–19, 2018, because of BYU's no-Sunday-play policy; all other regionals occurred May 18–20, 2018. The Super Regionals took place from May 24–27, 2018.

=== Eugene Super Regional ===
Round 1	Round 2
1	**Oregon**	**4**
Albany	0
1	**Oregon**	**5**
Drake	0
BYU	2
**Drake**	**3**
Eugene Regional
**BYU**	**16**^{(5)}
Albany	0
**Drake**	**3**
BYU	0
16	**Kentucky**	**10**^{(5)}
UIC	1
16	**Kentucky**	**10**
Notre Dame	0
**Notre Dame**	**4**
Michigan	1
Lexington Regional
UIC	0
**Michigan**	**6**
**Notre Dame**	**2**
Michigan	1

Regional Finals
1	**Oregon**	**3**	—
Drake	0	—
16	**Kentucky**	**8**^{(6)}	—
Notre Dame	0	—

Super Regionals
1	**Oregon**	6	**6**	**11**^{(5)}
16	Kentucky	**9**	1	1

=== Tempe Super Regional ===
Round 1	Round 2
8	**Arizona State**	**2**
New Mexico State	0
8	**Arizona State**	**7**
Ole Miss	1
Long Beach State	1
**Ole Miss**	**9**
Tempe Regional
New Mexico State	0
**Long Beach State**	**9**
**Ole Miss**	**1**
Long Beach State	0
9	**South Carolina**	**3**
UNC Greensboro	0
9	South Carolina	1
**Liberty**	**3**
**Liberty**	**2**^{(10)}
Hofstra	0
Columbia Regional
UNC Greensboro	0
**Hofstra**	**6**
9	**South Carolina**	**5**
Hofstra	4

Regional Finals
8	**Arizona State**	**9**	—
Ole Miss	0	—
Liberty	0	0
9	**South Carolina**	**2**	**5**

Super Regionals
8	**Arizona State**	**5**	**5**	—
9	South Carolina	2	2	—

=== Seattle Super Regional ===
Round 1	Round 2
5	**Washington**	**8**^{(5)}
Boise State	0
5	**Washington**	**2**
Texas	1
**Texas**	**2**
Minnesota	1
Seattle Regional
Boise State	3
**Minnesota**	**11**
Texas	0
**Minnesota**	**3**
12	**Alabama**	**8**^{(6)}
Middle Tennessee	0
12	**Alabama**	**9**
Wisconsin	1
Oregon State	3
**Wisconsin**	**9**^{(8)}
Tuscaloosa Regional
Middle Tennessee	0
**Oregon State**	**4**
Wisconsin	1
**Oregon State**	**5**

Regional Finals
5	**Washington**	**5**	—
Minnesota	2	—
12	**Alabama**	**6**	—
Oregon State	0	—

Super Regionals
5	**Washington**	**3**^{(9)}	**6**	—
12	Alabama	2	0	—

=== Norman Super Regional ===
Round 1	Round 2
4	**Oklahoma**	**9**^{(5)}
Boston University	0
4	**Oklahoma**	**8**
Tulsa	0
**Tulsa**	**9**^{(5)}
Missouri	1
Norman Regional
Boston University	8
**Missouri**	**10**
Tulsa	5
**Missouri**	**6**
13	**Arkansas**	**2**
DePaul	0
13	**Arkansas**	**5**
Wichita State	0
**Wichita State**	**8**
Oklahoma State	2
Fayetteville Regional
DePaul	0
**Oklahoma State**	**6**
**Wichita State**	**5**
Oklahoma State	4

Regional Finals
4	**Oklahoma**	**7**	—
Missouri	0	—
13	**Arkansas**	**6**	—
Wichita State	4	—

Super Regionals
4	**Oklahoma**	**7**	**9**	—
13	Arkansas	2	0	—

=== Los Angeles Super Regional ===
Round 1	Round 2
3	**UCLA**	**3**
Sacramento State	0
3	UCLA	2
**Cal State Fullerton**	**3**^{(9)}
**Cal State Fullerton**	**2**
Texas State	1
Los Angeles Regional
Sacramento State	4
**Texas State**	**8**
3	**UCLA**	**14**^{(5)}
Texas State	1
14	**Arizona**	**1**
Saint Francis (PA)	0
14	**Arizona**	**6**
North Dakota State	0
Mississippi State	4
**North Dakota State**	**5**
Tucson Regional
Saint Francis (PA)	5
**Mississippi State**	**11**
North Dakota State	0
**Mississippi State**	**12**

Regional Finals
Cal State Fullerton	0	4
3	**UCLA**	**3**	**6**
14	**Arizona**	**4**	—
Mississippi State	3	—

Super Regionals
3	**UCLA**	**7**	**3**	—
14	Arizona	1	2	—

=== Tallahassee Super Regional ===
Round 1	Round 2
6	**Florida State**	**8**^{(5)}
Jacksonville State	0
6	**Florida State**	**2**^{(8)}
Auburn	1
**Auburn**	**5**
Kennesaw State	2
Tallahassee Regional
**Jacksonville State**	**5**^{(10)}
Kennesaw State	3
Auburn	2
**Jacksonville State**	**3**
11	**LSU**	**9**^{(5)}
Fordham	0
11	**LSU**	**1**
Houston	0
**Houston**	**1**
Louisiana	0
Baton Rouge Regional
Fordham	3
**Louisiana**	**15**^{(5)}
Houston	2
**Louisiana**	**7**

Regional Finals
6	**Florida State**	**10**	—
Jacksonville State	0	—
11	**LSU**	4	**3**
Louisiana	**5**	1

Super Regionals
6	**Florida State**	5	**8**^{(11)}	**3**
11	LSU	**6**	5	1

=== Athens Super Regional ===
Round 1	Round 2
7	**Georgia**	**6**
Harvard	2
7	**Georgia**	**12**
Northwestern	0
**Northwestern**	**3**^{(8)}
California	2
Athens Regional
Harvard	1
**California**	**10**
**Northwestern**	**4**
California	3
10	**Tennessee**	**9**^{(5)}
Monmouth	0
10	**Tennessee**	**12**
James Madison	3
**James Madison**	**2**
Ohio	1
Knoxville Regional
Monmouth	0
**Ohio**	**4**
James Madison	3
**Ohio**	**7**

Regional Finals
7	**Georgia**	**9**	—
Northwestern	7	—
10	**Tennessee**	**5**	—
Ohio	1	—

Super Regionals
7	**Georgia**	**4**	**2**^{(8)}	—
10	Tennessee	3	1	—

=== Gainesville Super Regional ===
Round 1	Round 2
2	**Florida**	**8**^{(6)}
Bethune–Cookman	0
2	**Florida**	**10**^{(6)}
Ohio State	2
South Florida	1
**Ohio State**	**3**
Gainesville Regional
Bethune–Cookman	0
**South Florida**	**3**
**Ohio State**	**3**
South Florida	2
15	**Texas A&M**	**9**^{(5)}
Prairie View A&M	0
15	**Texas A&M**	**10**^{(6)}
McNeese State	1
Baylor	10
**McNeese State**	**11**
College Station Regional
Prairie View A&M	0
**Baylor**	**9**^{(5)}
McNeese State	0
**Baylor**	**6**

Regional Finals
2	**Florida**	**4**	—
Ohio State	0	—
15	**Texas A&M**	**10**	—
Baylor	4	—

Super Regionals
2	**Florida**	**5**	4	**5**
15	Texas A&M	4	**5**	3

== Women's College World Series ==
The Women's College World Series was held May 31 through June 6, 2018, in Oklahoma City.

=== Participants ===
School	Conference	Record (conference)	Head coach	WCWS appearances† (including 2018 WCWS)	WCWS best finish†*	WCWS W–L record† (excluding 2018 WCWS)
Arizona State	Pac-12	48–11 (16–8)	Trisha Ford	12 (last: 2013)	1st (2008, 2011)	17–16
Florida	SEC	55–9 (20–4)	Tim Walton	9 (last: 2017)	1st (2014, 2015)	25–14
Florida State	ACC	52–11 (21–3)	Lonni Alameda	10 (last: 2016)	3rd (2002, 2016)	8–17
Georgia	SEC	48–11 (16–8)	Lu Harris-Champer	4 (last: 2016)	3rd (2009, 2010)	5–6
Oklahoma	Big 12	55–3 (18–0)	Patty Gasso	12 (last: 2017)	1st (2000, 2013, 2016, 2017)	27-15
Oregon	Pac-12	52–8 (21–3)	Mike White	6 (last: 2017)	3rd (2014, 2017)	6–10
UCLA	Pac-12	55–5 (20–4)	Kelly Inouye-Perez	28 (last: 2017)	1st (1982, 1984, 1985, 1988, 1989, 1990, 1992, 1995*, 1999, 2003, 2004, 2010)	96–34
Washington	Pac-12	49–8 (15–8)	Heather Tarr	13 (last: 2017)	1st (2009)	21–19

† = From NCAA Division I Softball Championship Results

=== Bracket ===
First round
1	**Oregon**	**11**
8	Arizona State	6
4	Oklahoma	0
5	**Washington**	**2**
8	Arizona State	0
4	**Oklahoma**	**2**
3	**UCLA**	**7**
6	Florida State	4
2	**Florida**	**11**^{(5)}
7	Georgia	3
6	**Florida State**	7
7	Georgia	2

Second round
1	Oregon	2
5	**Washington**	**6**
2	Florida	0
4	**Oklahoma**	**2**
3	**UCLA**	**6**
2	Florida	5
1	Oregon	1
6	**Florida State**	**4**

Semifinals
5	**Washington**	**3**	—
4	Oklahoma	0	—
3	UCLA	1	6
6	**Florida State**	**3**	**12**

Finals
5	Washington	0	3	—
6	**Florida State**	**1**	**8**	—

=== All-tournament Team ===
The following players were members of the Women's College World Series All-Tournament Team.

Position	Player	School
P	Rachel Garcia	UCLA
P	Paige Parker	Oklahoma
P	Gabbie Plain	Washington
C	Taylor Pack	UCLA
C	Anna Shelnutt	Florida State
2B	Sydney Sherrill	Florida State
3B &	**Jessie Warren (MOP)**	Florida State
SS	Sis Bates	Washington
OF	Bubba Nickles	UCLA
OF	Trysten Melhart	Washington
U	Jocelyn Alo	Oklahoma
U	Meghan King	Florida State
U	Elizabeth Mason	Florida State

=== Championship Game ===
School	Top Batter	Stats.
Florida State Seminoles	Elizabeth Mason (DP)	2-3 3RBIs HR K
Washington Huskies	Noelle Hee (DP)	1-2 RBI

School	Pitcher	IP	H	R	ER	BB	SO	AB	BF
Florida State Seminoles	Meghan King (W)	7.0	5	3	1	0	4	25	28
Washington Huskies	Taran Alvelo (L)	3.1	7	7	6	1	4	16	18
Washington Huskies	Gabbie Plain	2.2	2	1	1	2	1	10	11

=== Schedule ===
Game	Time*	Matchup^{#}	Television	Attendance
Thursday, May 31
1	11:00 a.m.	No. 1 Oregon vs. No. 8 Arizona State	ESPN	8,561
2	1:30 p.m.	No. 4 Oklahoma vs. No. 5 Washington	ESPN	8,561
3	6:00 p.m.	No. 2 Florida vs. No. 7 Georgia	ESPN2	8,472
4	8:30 p.m.	No. 3 UCLA vs. No. 6 Florida State	ESPN2	8,472
Friday, June 1
5	6:00 p.m.	No. 1 Oregon vs. No. 5 Washington	ESPN	9,311
6	8:30 p.m.	No. 3 UCLA vs No. 2 Florida	ESPN	9,311
Saturday, June 2
7	11:00 a.m.	No. 8 Arizona State vs. No. 4 Oklahoma	ESPN	8,728
8	1:30 p.m.	No. 6 Florida State vs. No. 7 Georgia	ESPN	8,728
9	6:00 p.m.	No. 2 Florida vs. No. 4 Oklahoma	ESPN	8,728
10	8:30 p.m.	No. 1 Oregon vs. No. 6 Florida State	ESPN	8,728
Sunday, June 3
11	12:00 p.m.	No. 5 Washington vs. No. 4 Oklahoma	ESPN	8,932
12	2:30 p.m.	No. 3 UCLA vs. No. 6 Florida State	ESPN	8,932
13*	6:00 p.m.*	No. 3 UCLA vs. No. 6 Florida State	ESPN2	6,903
14*	8:30 p.m.*	Not Necessary	ESPN2	6,903
Monday, June 4
Finals, G1	6:00 p.m.	No. 5 Washington vs. No. 6 Florida State	ESPN	8,152
Tuesday, June 5
Finals, G2	7:00 p.m.	No. 5 Washington vs. No. 6 Florida State	ESPN	8,123
Wednesday, June 6*
Finals, G3*	7:00 p.m.		ESPN	–
*Game times in CDT. # – Rankings denote tournament seed.* = if necessary

== Record by conference ==
Conference	# of Bids	Record	Win %	RF	SR	WS	NS	F	NC
ACC	2	11–4	.714	2	1	1	1	1	1
Pac-12	7	33–13	.717	6	5	4	2	1	–
Big 12	4	11–8	.579	2	1	1	1	–	–
SEC	13	43–28	.606	12	9	2	–	–	–
Big Ten	5	8–10	.444	3	–	–	–	–	–
American	4	5–8	.385	1	–	–	–	–	–
Big West	2	3–4	.429	1	–	–	–	–	–
Sun Belt	2	4–4	.500	1	–	–	–	–	–
Big South	1	2–2	.500	1	–	–	–	–	–
MAC	1	2–2	.500	1	–	–	–	–	–
Missouri Valley	1	2–2	.500	1	–	–	–	–	–
Ohio Valley	1	2–2	.500	1	–	–	–	–	–
CAA	2	2–4	.333	–	–	–	–	–	–
Other	19	5–38	.116	–	–	–	–	–	–

The columns RF, SR, WS, NS, F, and NC respectively stand for the Regional Finals, Super Regionals, College World Series Teams, National Semi-Finals, Finals, and National Champion.

== Media coverage ==
=== Radio ===
Westwood One provided nationwide radio coverage of the championship series. It was streamed online at westwoodsports.com, through TuneIn, and on SiriusXM. John Sadak made his softball radio debut and joined returning analyst Leah Amico for Westwood One.

=== Television ===
ESPN holds exclusive rights to the tournament. They aired games across ESPN, ESPN2, ESPNU, SEC Network, and ESPN3. For the second time in the history of the women's softball tournament ESPN covered every regional.

==== Broadcast assignments ====
Regionals

- Eugene: Ted Enberg & Kenzie Fowler
- Lexington: Courtney Lyle & Jenny Dalton-Hill
- Columbia: Brad Muller & Dr. Megan Buning
- Tempe: Tiffany Greene & Amanda Scarborough
- Seattle: Eric Collins & Michele Smith
- Tuscaloosa: Melissa Lee & Leigh Dakich
- Fayetteville: Eric Frede & Jennie Ritter
- Norman: Pam Ward & Carol Bruggeman

Super Regionals

- Eugene: Mark Neely & Danielle Lawrie
- Tempe: Courtney Lyle & Jenny Dalton-Hill
- Seattle: Eric Frede & Jennie Ritter
- Norman: Pam Ward & Carol Bruggeman

Women's College World Series

- Adam Amin, Amanda Scarborough, & Laura Rutledge (afternoons, early Fri)
- Beth Mowins, Jessica Mendoza (minus Sunday), Michele Smith, & Holly Rowe (evenings minus early Fri)

Regionals

- Los Angeles: Trey Bender & Leah Amico
- Tucson: Mark Neely & Danielle Lawrie
- Baton Rouge: Lyn Rollins & Yvette Girouard
- Tallahassee: Cara Capuano & Cheri Kempf
- Athens: Alex Loeb & Megan Willis
- Knoxville: Alex Perlman & Francesca Enea
- College Station: Tyler Denning & Amanda Freed
- Gainesville: Kevin Brown & Erin Miller

Super Regionals

- Los Angeles: Beth Mowins, Jessica Mendoza, Michele Smith, & Holly Rowe
- Tallahassee: Kevin Brown & Erin Miller
- Athens: Alex Loeb & Megan Willis
- Gainesville: Tiffany Greene & Amanda Scarborough

Women's College World Series Finals

- Beth Mowins, Jessica Mendoza, Michele Smith, & Holly Rowe (tv)
- Adam Amin, Amanda Scarborough, Kayla Braud, & Laura Rutledge (ESPN3 Second Screen Experience)
