= List of Clemson Tigers softball seasons =

The following is a list of Clemson Tigers softball seasons. Clemson University is a member of the Atlantic Coast Conference of the NCAA Division I. The Tigers began varsity play in 2020. In their first full season, they won the ACC regular season, reached the ACC Tournament final, and appeared in their first NCAA Regional.

National champions	Women's College World Series berth	NCAA Tournament berth	Conference Tournament Champions	Conference Regular Season Champions

Season	Head coach	Conference	Season results									Tournament results	
Season	Head coach	Conference	Overall				Conference					Conference	Postseason
Season	Head coach	Conference	Wins	Losses	Ties	%	Wins	Losses	Ties	%	Finish	Conference	Postseason
2020	John Rittman	ACC	19	8	0	.704	5	1	0	.833	Season cancelled due to COVID-19		
2021	John Rittman	ACC	44	8	0	.846	29	5	0	.853	1st	2nd	Regionals
2022	John Rittman	ACC	42	17	0	.712	14	10	0	.583	5th	2nd	Super Regionals
2023	John Rittman	ACC	49	12	0	.803	18	6	0	.750	3rd	T-3rd	Super Regionals
2024	John Rittman	ACC	35	19	0	.648	15	9	0	.625	4th	T-3rd	Regionals
2025	John Rittman	ACC	48	14	0	.774	19	5	0	.792	2nd	1st	Super Regionals
2026	John Rittman	ACC	34	22	0	.607	13	11	0	.542	7th	T–9th	Regionals
