= Eddie Pellagrini =

American baseball player (1918–2006)

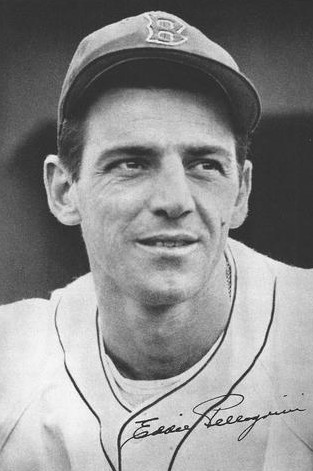
- Pellagirini in 1947
- Infielder
- Born: March 13, 1918; Boston, Massachusetts, U.S.
- Died: October 11, 2006 (aged 88); Weymouth, Massachusetts, U.S.
- Batted: Right Threw: Right

MLB debut
- April 22, 1946, for the Boston Red Sox

Last MLB appearance
- September 24, 1954, for the Pittsburgh Pirates

MLB statistics
- Batting average: .226
- Home runs: 20
- Runs batted in: 133
- Stats at Baseball Reference

Teams
- Boston Red Sox (1946–1947); St. Louis Browns (1948–1949); Philadelphia Phillies (1951); Cincinnati Reds (1952); Pittsburgh Pirates (1953–1954)

Edward Charles Pellagrini (March 13, 1918 – October 11, 2006) was an American professional baseball player and college baseball coach. He played as an infielder in the major leagues between 1946 and 1954 for five different teams. He went on to serve as head coach for the Boston College Eagles baseball program for 30 years.

== Playing career ==
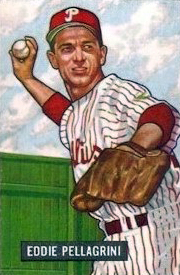
Pellagrini's 1951 Bowman baseball card

Pellagrini was born in Boston in 1918. He began his professional baseball career in 1938 and worked his way up through the minor leagues. He played for farm teams of the Boston Red Sox in 1939 and 1940, then spent 1941 with the minor-league San Diego Padres of the Pacific Coast League. His contract was purchased by the Red Sox in September 1941, and he played 19 games for their Double-A affiliate, the Louisville Colonels, in 1942.

Pellagrini spent May 1942 through October 1945 in the United States Navy. He spent time at Naval Station Great Lakes, playing on the baseball team there with Johnny Mize, and in the Pacific Theater. Due to World War II, Pellagrini did not play professionally during 1943, 1944, and 1945.

After returning from his military service, Pellagrini made the Red Sox' major-league roster for the 1946 season. On April 22, Pellagrini hit a home run in his first major-league at bat, having entered a game against the Washington Senators as a pinch runner after Red Sox starting shortstop Johnny Pesky was hit by a pitch. Pellagrini played in 22 major-league games that season, posting a .211 batting average, but did not appear in the World Series. Pellagrini returned to the Red Sox for the 1947 season, batting .203 in 74 games.

In November 1947, Pellagrini was traded to the St. Louis Browns in a multi-player deal that brought Vern Stephens to Boston. Pellagrini appeared in 105 games for the Browns in 1948 and 79 games in 1949, batting .238 in both of those seasons. He then spent the 1950 season with the Browns' Triple-A team, the minor-league Baltimore Orioles, batting .282 in 130 games. Pellagrini spent the final four years of his career with three National League teams, posting a career-high .253 average with the Pittsburgh Pirates in 1953.

Pellagrini ended his major-league career with a .226 batting average, having recorded 20 home runs and 133 runs batted in (RBIs) in 563 games. Primarily a shortstop (221 games), he also played over 100 games as both a second baseman and third baseman. Pellagrini also appeared in 678 minor-league games, during which he hit 62 home runs and batted .279.

== Coaching career ==
Pellagrini served as head coach for the Boston College Eagles baseball program from 1958 to 1990, except for the 1969 season, which he missed due to illness. He compiled an overall record of 359–345–6, yielding a .510 winning percentage. He guided the team to three appearances in the College World Series (1960, 1961, and 1967) along with NCAA tournament appearances in 1962 and 1966.

In 1960, the Eagles defeated Connecticut and Holy Cross in the regional tournament to advance to the College World Series, where they beat Northern Colorado before losing to USC and Oklahoma State. In 1961, the Eagles beat Springfield and took two games out of three against Connecticut in the regionals, again moving on to the College World Series; they beat Western Michigan and Duke, but lost twice to eventual champion USC and fell one game short of the championship contest.

The 1962 tournament saw the Eagles eliminated with regional losses to Vermont and Bridgeport, and they were again eliminated in 1966 with a regional loss to Northeastern after beating UMass. Pellagrini took his team back to the College World Series in 1967, taking two games out of three against both Dartmouth and UMass in the regionals. An opening-round College World Series win against Rider was followed by losses to eventual champion Arizona State and Houston, the latter a 3–2 decision in 13 innings, ending the Eagles' play.

In a ceremony on May 3, 1997, the Boston College's varsity baseball field was formally rededicated as the Eddie Pellagrini Diamond at John Shea Field. After the baseball program moved to a new stadium in 2018, that facility was also named in his honor, as the Eddie Pellagrini Diamond at Harrington Athletics Village.

Pellagrini died in 2006 at age 88 in Weymouth, Massachusetts. He was buried at Massachusetts National Cemetery in Bourne.

== See also ==
- Boston Red Sox all-time roster
- List of Major League Baseball players with a home run in their first major league at bat
