= 2026 Clemson Tigers softball team =

American college softball season

2026 Clemson Tigers softball
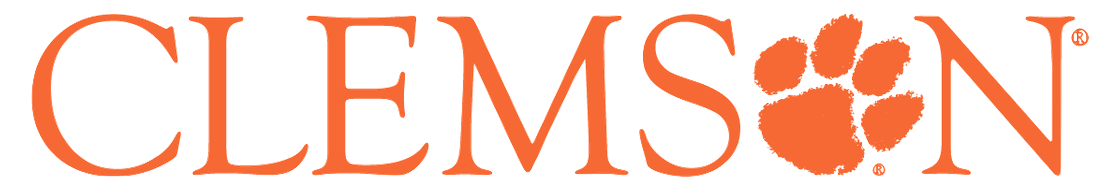

NCAA Athens Regional
- Conference: Atlantic Coast Conference
- Record: 34–22 (13–11 ACC)
- Head coach: John Rittman (7th season)
- Assistant coaches: Kyle Jamieson (7th season); Katie Repole (2nd season); Ryan Wieligman (2nd season)
- Home stadium: McWhorter Stadium

2026 Atlantic Coast Conference softball standings
	Conf.				Overall
Team	W		L	PCT	W		L	PCT
No. 7 Florida State ‍†‍‡‍^{y}	21	–	3	.875	58	–	11	.841
No. 13 Duke ‍‍‍^{y}	20	–	4	.833	44	–	17	.721
No. 11 Virginia Tech ‍‍‍^{y}	18	–	6	.750	48	–	12	.800
No. 25 Louisville ‍‍‍^{y}	18	–	6	.750	45	–	14	.763
No. 14 Stanford ‍‍‍^{y}	18	–	6	.750	39	–	15	.722
No. 24 Virginia ‍‍‍^{y}	13	–	10	.565	40	–	14	.741
Clemson ‍‍‍^{y}	13	–	11	.542	34	–	22	.607
Notre Dame ‍‍‍	11	–	13	.458	25	–	28	.472
Georgia Tech ‍‍‍^{y}	10	–	14	.417	32	–	29	.525
North Carolina ‍‍‍	9	–	15	.375	32	–	19	.627
Pittsburgh ‍‍‍	8	–	16	.333	25	–	27	.481
NC State ‍‍‍	7	–	16	.304	27	–	26	.509
California ‍‍‍	5	–	19	.208	15	–	37	.288
Syracuse ‍‍‍	4	–	18	.182	18	–	26	.409
Boston College ‍‍‍	3	–	21	.125	13	–	38	.255
† – Conference champion ‡ – Tournament champion y – Invited to the NCAA Tournament; As of May 24, 2026; Rankings from NFCA/USA Today

The 2026 Clemson Tigers softball team was the varsity college softball team that represented Clemson University during the 2026 NCAA Division I softball season. This was the seventh season of Clemson's softball program. The Tigers competed in the Atlantic Coast Conference (ACC) and were led by head coach John Rittman, in his seventh season. Clemson played its home games at McWhorter Stadium in Clemson, South Carolina.

Clemson began the season at the NFCA Leadoff Classic in Clearwater, Florida. They went 3–2 overall in the tournament, defeating fifth-ranked Oregon and twenty-first ranked Liberty but losing to un-ranked Auburn and Michigan State. This saw the Tigers fall from ranked thirteenth in the nation to eighteenth. They defeated Furman before traveling to San Marcos, Texas to participate in the Bobcat Tournament. The team went 2–2 in the tournament, losing their only game against a ranked opponent, ninth-ranked Arkansas. The results saw them fall to twenty-third in the rankings. Clemson then hosted the Clemson Classic, where they won all four games to finish as tournament champions. Despite the tournament victory, a loss to Charlotte caused the team to fall to twenty-fifth in the rankings. The Tigers won a non-tournament game at fifteenth-ranked Georgia before going 2–2 in the Tiger Invitational. They split two games against twelfth-ranked Mississippi State during the tournament. They began ACC play against Georgia Tech, and won their opening series two games to one. The win saw the Tigers rise to twenty-fourth in the rankings where they defeated Winthrop and beat Louisville in an ACC series 2–1. The loss saw the team slip to twenty-fifth in the rankings. Another 3–1 week saw the Tigers fall out of the rankings. They defeated rivals and twenty-third ranked South Carolina before being swept in an ACC series against eighth-ranked Florida State. They ended March with a defeat of Gardner–Webb. They began April with back-to-back road ACC series. They lost against eleventh-ranked Virginia Tech 1–2 and defeated Pittsburgh 2–1. They lost a rivalry re-match against South Carolina before sweeping eighteenth ranked Virginia. They won their final non-conference game of the season over Presbyterian before losing their final ACC series of the year against fourteenth-ranked Duke.

The Tigers finished the regular season 32–19 and 13–11 in ACC play to finish in seventh place. The seventh-place finish was the worst in club history, and the thirteen wins were their lowest total outside of the pandemic shortened 2020 season. As the seventh seed in the 2026 Atlantic Coast Conference softball tournament, they were defeated 2–4 by tenth-seed North Carolina. The Tigers were awarded an at-large bid to the 2026 NCAA Division I softball tournament. They were an unseeded team and were placed in the Athens Regional. The Tigers lost the opening game against UNC Greensboro before defeating Charleston and winning a rematch against UNC Greensboro. This saw them needing to win two games in a row against ten seed and sixteenth-ranked Georgia in order to advance to the Super Regional. Despite defeating Georgia during the regular season, the Tigers lost the post-season game 0–5 to end the season. The Tigers finished with a 34–22 overall record, which was both a program low for wins and program high for losses during full seasons.

== Previous season ==
The Tigers finished the regular season 41–12 and 19–6 in ACC play to finish in second place, just a half game behind Florida State for first place. As the second seed in the ACC Tournament they earned a bye into the Quarterfinals where they defeated twenty-fifth ranked and seventh seed Virginia 7–4. In the semifinals they defeated third seed and thirteenth ranked Virginia Tech 10–9. They met first seed and sixth ranked Florida State in the Final, which Clemson won 2–1. This was the first ACC tournament title in Clemson program history. As tournament champions, the Tigers earned an automatic bid to the 2025 NCAA Division I softball tournament. They were the eleventh overall seed and paired with sixth overall seed Texas in the Austin Super Regional. Clemson went 3–0 in their regional, defeating USC Upstate by mercy rule, Northwestern in extra innings, and Kentucky 5–1 in the final game. They advanced to face Texas in Austin. The Tigers won the opening game 7–4 but lost the next game 7–5 in ten innings to set up a deciding game three. The Tigers lost a close deciding game 6–5 to end their season. Texas would go on to win the National Championship. The Tigers finished 48–13 overall, which was just one win shy of their program record set in 2023.

== Offseason moves ==
=== Departures ===
Departures
Name	B/T	Number	Pos.	Height	Year	Hometown	Reason for departure
Brooke McCubbin	R/R	2	RHP	5'10"	Senior	Locust Grove, GA	Graduated
Aby Vieira	L/R	4	C/UTL	5'9"	Senior	Mission Viejo, CA	Graduated
Reese Basinger	L/R	7	RHP	5'11"	Senior	Evans, GA	Graduated
Haylee Whitesides	R/R	11	INF	5'5"	(redshirt) Junior	Duncan, SC	Transferred to North Greenville
Abi Stuart	R/R	13	C/UTL	5'9"	(redshirt) Senior	Snow Camp, NC	Graduated
Brook Melnychuk	R/R	19	RHP	5'5"	Graduate Student	Hudson Bay, Canada	Graduated
Jadeyn Ruszkowski	L/L	21	OF	5'8"	(redshirt) Junior	Lithia, FL	Graduated
Alex Brown	L/R	25	INF	5'7"	Senior	Savannah, GA	Graduated
Maddie Moore	R/R	28	INF	5'7"	Senior	Loomis, CA	Graduated

=== Incoming transfers ===
Incoming transfers
Name	B/T	Number	Pos.	Height	Year	Hometown	Previous school
Kiley Channell	R/R	2	INF	5'4"	Junior	Keystone Heights, FL	Florida Atlantic
Abby Dunning	R/R	4	RHP	5'4"	Graduate Student	Chicago, IL	Boston College
Sierra Maness	R/R	7	RHP	5'7"	Junior	Woodruff, SC	USC Upstate
Corri Hicks	R/R	99	C/1B	5'9"	Sophomore	San Jose, CA	Oklahoma

=== Incoming recruits ===
Incoming Recruits
Name	B/T	Number	Pos.	Height	Hometown	High School
Mac Pavese	L/L	11	1B/OF	5'8"	Canton, GA	Cherokee
Maddie Johnson	R/R	15	RHP	5'10"	Aynor, SC	Aynor
Sophia Burmeister	R/R	23	C/3B	5'9"	Poway, CA	Poway
Lexie Hames	R/R	33	RHP	5'10"	Harmony, PA	Seneca Valley
Sarah Rocheleau	R/R	37	OF	5'10"	Fort Mill, SC	Catawba Ridge
Keira Crosby	R/R	43	RHP	5'7"	New Caney, TX	Woodlands Christian
Sarah Breaux	R/R	66	INF	5'9"	Miami Springs, FL	Doral Academy

== Roster ==
2026 Clemson Tigers softball team
Players
Coaches

#	Pos.	Name	Bats/throws	Height	Year	Home town
1	OF	Kennedy Ariail	R/R	5 ft 6 in (1.68 m)	Jr	Cumming, GA
2	INF	Kiley Channell	R/R	5 ft 4 in (1.63 m)	Jr	Keystone Heights, FL
3	OF	Kylee Johnson	R/R	5 ft 8 in (1.73 m)	Jr	Wesley Chapel, FL
4	RHP	Aby Dunning	R/R	5 ft 4 in (1.63 m)	GS	Chicago, IL
5	INF	Marian Collins	L/R	5 ft 11 in (1.8 m)	So	Marietta, GA
7	RHP	Sierra Maness	R/R	5 ft 7 in (1.7 m)	Jr	Woodruff, SC
8	INF	Madi Lardizabal	R/R	5 ft 8 in (1.73 m)	So	Murrieta, CA
9	OF	Jamison Brockenbrough	L/R	5 ft 8 in (1.73 m)	Sr	Locust Grove, GA
10	C	Riley Burton	R/R	5 ft 11 in (1.8 m)	Jr	Lancaster, SC
11	OF	Mac Pavese	L/L	5 ft 8 in (1.73 m)	Fr	Canton, GA
12	INF	Julia Knowler	L/R	5 ft 9 in (1.75 m)	Jr	Fort Myers, FL
15	RHP	Maddie Johnson	R/R	5 ft 10 in (1.78 m)	Fr	Aynor, SC
16	RHP	Macey Cintron	R/R	5 ft 11 in (1.8 m)	So	Cumming, GA
17	OF	Ava Wilson	L/R	5 ft 9 in (1.75 m)	So	Acworth, GA
20	OF	Sam Minish	L/L	5 ft 6 in (1.68 m)	So	Hull, GA
22	INF	Taylor Pipkins	R/R	5 ft 6 in (1.68 m)	RS So	Cumming, GA
23	C	Sophia Burmeister	R/R	5 ft 9 in (1.75 m)	Fr	Poway, CA
27	OF	Riley Fennell	R/R	5 ft 8 in (1.73 m)	So	Ovideo, FL
33	RHP	Lexie Hames	R/R	5 ft 10 in (1.78 m)	Fr	Harmony, PA
37	OF	Sarah Rocheleau	R/R	5 ft 10 in (1.78 m)	Fr	Fort Mill, SC
43	RHP	Keira Crosby	R/R	5 ft 7 in (1.7 m)	Fr	New Caney, TX
44	LHP	Olivia Duncan	R/L	5 ft 10 in (1.78 m)	Jr	Buford, GA
66	INF	Sarah Breaux	R/R	5 ft 9 in (1.75 m)	Fr	Miami Springs, FL
99	C	Corri Hicks	R/R	5 ft 9 in (1.75 m)	So	San Jose, CA

Head coach

- John Rittman (New Mexico State)

Assistant coach(es)

- Kyle Jamieson (Brock)
- Katie Repole (Louisiana)
- Ryan Wielgman (Henderson State)

Legend

- (C) Team captain
- (S) Suspended
- (I) Ineligible
- Injured
- Current redshirt

Roster
Last update: February 16, 2026

== Schedule ==
Legend
	Clemson win
	Clemson loss
	Cancellation
**Bold**	Clemson team member
*	Non-Conference game
†	Make-Up Game

2026 Clemson Tigers softball game log
Regular season (32–19)

February (13–6)
Date	Time (ET)	Opponent	Rank	Site/Stadium	Score	Win	Loss	Save	Attendance	Overall Record	ACC Record
Feb 5	7:00 p.m.	vs Southeastern Louisiana*	No. 13	Eddie C. Moore Complex • Clearwater, FL (NFCA Leadoff Classic)	**W** 5–3 (8)	**Dunning** (1–0)	Oubre (0–1)	**Maness** (1)	250	1–0	–
Feb 6	4:00 p.m.	vs No. 5 Oregon*	No. 13	Eddie C. Moore Complex • Clearwater, FL (NFCA Leadoff Classic)	**W** 6–5	**Dunning** (2–0)	Grein (0–1)	**Maness** (2)	431	2–0	–
Feb 6	7:00 p.m.	vs No. 21 Liberty*	No. 13	Eddie C. Moore Complex • Clearwater, FL (NFCA Leadoff Classic)	**W** 9–4	**Maness** (1–0)	Love (0–1)	None	543	3–0	–
Feb 7	3:00 p.m.	vs Auburn*	No. 13	Eddie C. Moore Complex • Clearwater, FL (NFCA Leadoff Classic)	**L** 5–10	Harrison (2–0)	**Dunning** (2–1)	None	543	3–1	–
Feb 8	10:00 a.m.	vs Michigan State*	No. 13	Eddie C. Moore Complex • Clearwater, FL (NFCA Leadoff Classic)	**L** 2–5	Cassady (1–1)	**Hames** (0–1)	None	465	3–2	–
Feb 10	6:00 p.m.	Furman*	No. 18	McWhorter Stadium • Clemson, SC	**W** 9–1 (5)	**Dunning** (3–1)	Embler (0–3)	None	1,587	4–2	–
Feb 12	6:00 p.m.	at Texas State*	No. 18	Bobcat Softball Stadium • San Marcos, TX (Bobcat Tournament)	**L** 0–4	Azua (2–2)	**Maness** (1–1)	None	754	4–3	–
Feb 13	5:45 p.m.	vs No. 9 Arkansas*	No. 18	Bobcat Softball Stadium • San Marcos, TX (Bobcat Tournament)	**L** 0–12 (5)	Herron (3–0)	**Dunning** (3–2)	None	N/A	4–4	–
Feb 13	8:00 p.m.	vs BYU*	No. 18	Bobcat Softball Stadium • San Marcos, TX (Bobcat Tournament)	**W** 7–0	**Crosby** (1–0)	Mares (1–1)	None	230	5–4	–
Feb 15	10:00 a.m.	vs Wichita State*	No. 18	Bobcat Softball Stadium • San Marcos, TX (Bobcat Tournament)	**W** 9–3	**Maness** (2–1)	Nihard (1–2)	None	N/A	6–4	–
Feb 15	11:00 a.m.	vs No. 9 Arkansas*	No. 18	Bobcat Softball Stadium • San Marcos, TX (Bobcat Tournament)	Canceled						
Feb 18	5:00 p.m.	at Charlotte*	No. 23	Sue M. Daughtridge Stadium • Charlotte, NC	**L** 3–8	Jones (4–1)	**Maness** (2–2)	None	400	6–5	–
Feb 20	12:30 p.m.	Lipscomb*	No. 23	McWhorter Stadium • Clemson, SC (Clemson Classic)	**W** 8–0 (6)	**Hames** (1–1)	Beam (1–4)	None	1,529	7–5	–
Feb 20	3:00 p.m.	Coastal Carolina*	No. 23	McWhorter Stadium • Clemson, SC (Clemson Classic)	**W** 8–0 (5)	**Dunning** (4–2)	Henderson (3–3	None	1,785	8–5	–
Feb 21	3:00 p.m.	Baylor*	No. 23	McWhorter Stadium • Clemson, SC (Clemson Classic)	**W** 8–0 (5)	**Maness** (3–2)	Tanner (3–2)	None	1,822	9–5	–
Feb 22	12:30 p.m.	Baylor*	No. 23	McWhorter Stadium • Clemson, SC (Clemson Classic)	**W** 3–0	**Maness** (4–2)	Creager (2–2)	None	1,734	10–5	–
Feb 25	6:00 p.m.	at No. 15 Georgia*	No. 25	Jack Turner Stadium • Athens, GA	**W** 10–1 (6)	**Maness** (5–2)	Roelling (5–3)	None	1,000	11–5	–
Feb 27	12:30 p.m.	Wofford*	No. 25	McWhorter Stadium • Clemson, SC (Tiger Invitational)	**W** 9–1 (5)	**Hames** (2–1)	Greenwood (5–1)	None	1,633	12–5	–
Feb 27	3:00 p.m.	Georgia Southern*	No. 25	McWhorter Stadium • Clemson, SC (Tiger Invitational)	**L** 7–8	Croft (1–0)	**Maness** (5–3)	None	1,782	12–6	–
Feb 28	3:00 p.m.	No. 12 Mississippi State*	No. 25	McWhorter Stadium • Clemson, SC (Tiger Invitational)	**W** 3–0	**Maness** (6–3)	Faircloth (6–1)	None	1,923	13–6	–

March (10–7)
Date	Time (ET)	Opponent	Rank	Site/Stadium	Score	Win	Loss	Save	Attendance	Overall Record	ACC Record
Mar 1	12:30 p.m.	No. 12 Mississippi State*	No. 25	McWhorter Stadium • Clemson, SC (Tiger Invitational)	**L** 1–9 (6)	Goold (7–1)	**Hames** (2–2)	None	1,984	13–7	—
Mar 4	6:00 p.m.	College of Charleston*	No. 25	McWhorter Stadium • Clemson, SC	**W** 7–0	**Maness** (7–3)	Raymond (3–2)	None	1,557	14–7	—
Mar 6	6:00 p.m.	Georgia Tech	No. 25	McWhorter Stadium • Clemson, SC	**W** 9–4	**Maness** (8–3)	Coffield (1–1)	None	1,903	15–7	1–0
Mar 7	1:00 p.m.	Georgia Tech	No. 25	McWhorter Stadium • Clemson, SC	**W** 1–0	**Dunning** (5–2)	Coffield (1–2)	None	1,816	16–7	2–0
Mar 8	6:00 p.m.	Georgia Tech	No. 25	McWhorter Stadium • Clemson, SC	**L** 3–4	Johnson (8–4)	**Dunning** (5–3)	Hilleary (1)	1,533	16–8	2–1
Mar 10	6:00 p.m.	Winthrop*	No. 24	McWhorter Stadium • Clemson, SC	**W** 7–3	**Maness** (9–3)	Cardenas (2–5)	None	1,412	17–8	—
Mar 13	4:00 p.m.	Louisville*	No. 24	McWhorter Stadium • Clemson, SC	**W** 8–6	**Maness** (10–3)	Zabala (5–2)	None	2,083	18–8	3–1
Mar 14	1:00 p.m.	Louisville*	No. 24	McWhorter Stadium • Clemson, SC	**W** 4–0	**Dunning** (6–3)	Gohs (3–1)	None	2,001	19–8	4–1
Mar 15	12:00 p.m.	Louisville*	No. 24	McWhorter Stadium • Clemson, SC	**L** 6–7	Gray (5–1)	**Dunning** (6–4)	None	1,704	19–9	4–2
Mar 18	5:00 p.m.	at Western Carolina*	No. 25	Catamount Softball Complex • Cullowhee, NC	**W** 7–3	**Maness** (11–3)	Batson (7–1)	None	411	20–9	—
Mar 20	6:00 p.m.	at Notre Dame	No. 25	Melissa Cook Stadium • Notre Dame, IN	**W** 4–0	**Maness** (12–3)	Kastor (3–8)	None	354	21–9	5–2
Mar 21	1:00 p.m.	at Notre Dame	No. 25	Melissa Cook Stadium • Notre Dame, IN	**L** 3–11 (6)	Hagan (1–0)	**Dunning** (6–5)	Kamzik (2)	534	21–10	5–3
Mar 22	12:00 p.m.	at Notre Dame	No. 25	Melissa Cook Stadium • Notre Dame, IN	**W** 4–1	**Maness** (13–3)	Weiss (6–6)	None	280	22–10	6–3
Mar 25	7:30 p.m.	at No. 23 South Carolina*		Carolina Softball Stadium at Beckham Field • Columbia, SC (Rivalry)	**W** 8–0 (6)	**Maness** (14–3)	Lamb (4–5)	None	1,647	23–10	—
Mar 27	6:00 p.m.	No. 8 Florida State		McWhorter Stadium • Clemson, SC	**L** 1–4	Reid (4–1)	**Maness** (14–4)	Danley (1)	2,026	23–11	6–4
Mar 28	12:00 p.m.	No. 8 Florida State		McWhorter Stadium • Clemson, SC	**L** 2–4	Danley (7–1)	**Dunning** (6–6)	None	2,116	23–12	6–5
Mar 29	6:00 p.m.	No. 8 Florida State		McWhorter Stadium • Clemson, SC	**L** 3–7	Reid (5–1)	**Maness** (14–5)	None	1,912	23–13	6–6
Mar 31	6:00 p.m.	Gardner–Webb*		McWhorter Stadium • Clemson, SC	**W** 12–4 (6)	**Crosby** (2–0)	Frye (6–5)	**Dunning** (1)	1,902	24–13	—

April (8–6)
Date	Time (ET)	Opponent	Rank	Site/Stadium	Score	Win	Loss	Save	Attendance	Overall Record	ACC Record
Apr 2	6:00 p.m.	at No. 11 Virginia Tech		Tech Softball Park • Blacksburg, VA	**W** 4–2	**Maness** (15–5)	Mazzarone (8–2)	None	1,040	25–13	7–6
Apr 3	6:00 p.m.	at No. 11 Virginia Tech		Tech Softball Park • Blacksburg, VA	**L** 1–9 (5)	Carrico (10–0)	**Dunning** (6–7)	None	1,101	25–14	7–7
Apr 4	2:00 p.m.	at No. 11 Virginia Tech		Tech Softball Park • Blacksburg, VA	**L** 5–10	Mazzarone (9–2)	**Maness** (15–6)	None	1,165	25–15	7–8
Apr 10	4:00 p.m.	at Pittsburgh		Vartabedian Field • Pittsburgh, PA	**L** 5–8	Sparks (5–1)	**Maness** (15–7)	None	224	25–16	7–9
Apr 11	7:00 p.m.	at Pittsburgh		Vartabedian Field • Pittsburgh, PA	**W** 13–2 (5)	**Cintron** (1–0)	Pittman (7–6)	None	667	26–16	8–9
Apr 12	1:00 p.m.	at Pittsburgh		Vartabedian Field • Pittsburgh, PA	**W** 11–7	**Cintron** (2–0)	Duck (3–6)	None	667	27–16	9–9
Apr 14	6:00 p.m.	South Carolina*		McWhorter Stadium • Clemson, SC	**L** 1–3	Heard (7–8)	**Maness** (15–8)	None	2,034	27–17	—
Apr 17	6:00 p.m.	No. 18 Virginia		McWhorter Stadium • Clemson, SC	**W** 12–4 (6)	**Cintron** (3–0)	Bigham (12–2)	None	1,908	28–17	10–9
Apr 18	1:00 p.m.	No. 18 Virginia		McWhorter Stadium • Clemson, SC	**W** 3–1	**Cintron** (4–0)	Smith (5–1)	None	2,002	29–17	11–9
Apr 19	12:00 p.m.	No. 18 Virginia		McWhorter Stadium • Clemson, SC	**W** 6–1	**Maness** (16–8)	Bigham (12–3)	None	1,826	30–17	12–9
Apr 21	6:00 p.m.	Presbyterian*		McWhorter Stadium • Clemson, SC	**W** 10–0 (5)	**Dunning** (7–7)	Duncan (11–13)	None	1,522	31–17	—
Apr 24	6:00 p.m.	at No. 14 Duke		Duke Softball Stadium • Durham, NC	**L** 2–10 (6)	Curd (16–2)	**Maness** (16–9)	None	637	31–18	12–10
Apr 25	1:00 p.m.	at No. 14 Duke		Duke Softball Stadium • Durham, NC	**W** 13–10	**Dunning** (8–7)	Jacquez (5–5)	None	677	32–18	13–10
Apr 26	5:00 p.m.	at No. 14 Duke		Duke Softball Stadium • Durham, NC	**L** 0–6	Curd (17–2)	**Dunning** (8–8)	None	657	32–19	13–11

Postseason (2–3)

ACC Tournament (0–1)
Date	Time (ET)	Seed	Opponent	Opponent Seed	Site/Stadium	Score	Win	Loss	Save	Attendance	Overall Record
May 6	5:00 p.m.	7	North Carolina	10	Palmer Park • Charlottesville, VA	**L** 2–4	Livengood (2–3)	**Maness** (16–10)	None	1,185	32–20

NCAA Athens Regional (2–2)
Date	Time (ET)	Regional Seed	Rank	Opponent	Opponent Regional Seed	Site/Stadium	Score	Win	Loss	Save	Attendance	Overall Record
May 15	4:30 p.m.	2		vs. UNC Greensboro	3	Jack Turner Stadium • Athens, GA	**L** 0–1	Shroyer (22–6)	**Dunning** (8–9)	None	1,024	32–21
May 16	3:30 p.m.	2		vs. Charleston	4	Jack Turner Stadium • Athens, GA	**W** 3–0	**Cintron** (5–0)	Mathis (16–10)	**Dunning** (1)	1,239	33–21
May 16	6:30 p.m.	2		vs. UNC Greensboro	3	Jack Turner Stadium • Athens, GA	**W** 4–1	**Dunning** (9–9)	Jones (7–5)	None	1,855	34–21
May 17	12:00 p.m.	2		at No. 16 Georgia	1	Jack Turner Stadium • Athens, GA	**L** 0–5	Fisher (12–5)	**Dunning** (9–10)	None	1,303	34–22

Note: All rankings shown are from the NFCA/USA Today poll.

== Rankings ==
Ranking movements Legend: ██ Increase in ranking ██ Decrease in ranking — = Not ranked RV = Received votes
	Week															
Poll	Pre	1	2	3	4	5	6	7	8	9	10	11	12	13	14	Final
NFCA / USA Today	13	18	23	25	25	24	25	RV	RV	—	—	RV	RV	RV	—	RV
Softball America	9	17	—	—	—	RV	23	21	25	—	—	24	24	22	22*	—
ESPN.com/USA Softball	12	18	24	RV	RV	RV	RV	RV	RV	RV	RV	23	22	21	22	24
D1Softball	15	22	RV	RV	RV	25	RV	RV	RV	—	—	24	22	22	22*	RV

* Various polls did not release during the NCAA tournament.
* indicates that the ranking is from pre-tournament for comparison purposes.
