= 2025 Clemson Tigers softball team =

American college softball season

2025 Clemson Tigers softball
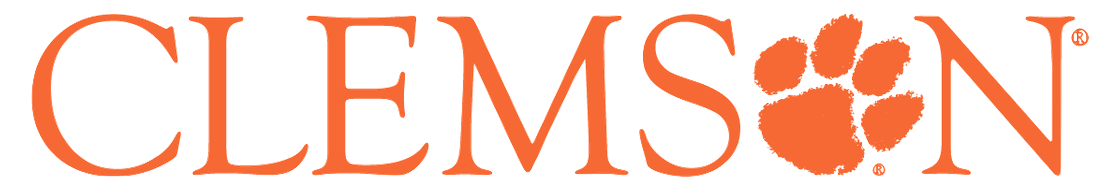

ACC tournament champion

NCAA Tournament, Austin Super Regional
- Conference: Atlantic Coast Conference

Ranking
- Coaches: No. 11
- Record: 48–14 (19–5 ACC)
- Head coach: John Rittman (6th season)
- Assistant coaches: Kyle Jamieson (6th season); Katie Repole (1st season); Ryan Wieligman (1st season)
- Home stadium: McWhorter Stadium

2025 Atlantic Coast Conference softball standings
	Conf.						Overall
Team	W		L		T	PCT	W		L		T	PCT
No. 5 Florida State ‍†‍‍^{y}	18	–	3	–	0	.857	49	–	12	–	0	.803
No. 13 Clemson ‍‍‡‍^{y}	19	–	5	–	0	.792	48	–	14	–	0	.774
No. 15 Virginia Tech ‍‍‍^{y}	18	–	6	–	0	.750	43	–	13	–	0	.768
No. 16 Stanford ‍‍‍^{y}	16	–	8	–	0	.667	42	–	11	–	0	.792
No. 21 Duke ‍‍‍^{y}	16	–	8	–	0	.667	41	–	18	–	0	.695
North Carolina ‍‍‍^{y}	15	–	9	–	0	.625	40	–	17	–	0	.702
No. 25 Virginia ‍‍‍^{y}	14	–	10	–	0	.583	38	–	19	–	0	.667
Georgia Tech ‍‍‍^{y}	10	–	11	–	0	.476	27	–	24	–	0	.529
California ‍‍‍^{y}	11	–	13	–	0	.458	37	–	21	–	0	.638
Louisville ‍‍‍	9	–	15	–	0	.375	26	–	25	–	0	.510
Notre Dame ‍‍‍	7	–	17	–	0	.292	23	–	31	–	1	.427
Pittsburgh ‍‍‍	7	–	17	–	0	.292	20	–	32	–	0	.385
Syracuse ‍‍‍	6	–	18	–	0	.250	27	–	22	–	0	.551
NC State ‍‍‍	6	–	18	–	0	.250	25	–	29	–	0	.463
Boston College ‍‍‍	5	–	19	–	0	.208	22	–	29	–	0	.431
† – Conference champion ‡ – Tournament champion y – Invited to the NCAA Tournament; As of May 24, 2025; Rankings from NFCA/USA Today

The 2025 Clemson Tigers softball team was the varsity college softball team that represented Clemson University during the 2025 NCAA Division I softball season. This was the sixth season of Clemson's softball program. The Tigers competed in the Atlantic Coast Conference (ACC) and were led by head coach John Rittman. Clemson played its home games at McWhorter Stadium in Clemson, South Carolina.

The Tigers started the season by travelling to the FAU Softball Tournament and then the Shriners Children's Clearwater Invitational. The start of the season proved difficult for the Tigers as they went 3–2 at the FAU Tournament, and 1–4 at the Clearwater invitational. They began the season ranked twenty-fifth, but dropped out after the FAU Touranmament. They only played two ranked teams during the tournaments, losing to both sixteenth ranked Missouri and twenty-third ranked Kentucky. They followed their travels with two home tournaments in the Clemson Classic and Tiger Invitational. The Tigers went a combined 9–0 during these tournaments, but did not face a ranked team ein either. They recorded a 5–3 mid-week victory over tenth ranked Georgia on February 26. They finished February 12–6 overall. They opened the ACC season against fourteenth ranked Duke. They dropped the series despite winning the first game by mercy rule. They bounced back to win their next ACC series against North Carolina. Their only other loss in March was against rivals and tenth ranked South Carolina. They finished March with a 15–4 record. April started with a road test at fifteenth ranked Stanford. The Tigers took the series two games to one, winning the deciding game 7–6. The victory saw them return to the rankings at number twenty-four. A sweep of NC State and a victory over thirteenth-ranked South Carolina saw them rise to nineteenth in the rankings for the final week of the season. They finished the season with four wins, including a mid-week, extra inning victory over fourth-ranked Tennessee and a sweep of Georgia Tech. The Tigers finished April with a 14–2 record and rose to fifteenth in the rankings prior to the postseason.

The Tigers finished the regular season 41–12 and 19–6 in ACC play to finish in second place, just a half game behind Florida State for first place. As the second seed in the ACC Tournament they earned a bye into the Quarterfinals where they defeated twenty-fifth ranked and seventh seed Virginia 7–4. In the semifinals they defeated third seed and thirteenth ranked Virginia Tech 10–9. They met first seed and sixth ranked Florida State in the Final, which Clemson won 2–1. This was the first ACC tournament title in Clemson program history. As tournament champions, the Tigers earned an automatic bid to the 2025 NCAA Division I softball tournament. They were the eleventh overall seed and paired with sixth overall seed Texas in the Austin Super Regional. Clemson went 3–0 in their regional, defeating USC Upstate by mercy rule, Northwestern in extra innings, and Kentucky 5–1 in the final game. They advanced to face Texas in Austin. The Tigers won the opening game 7–4 but lost the next game 7–5 in ten innings to set up a deciding game three. The Tigers lost a close deciding game 6–5 to end their season. Texas would go on to win the National Championship. The Tigers finished 48–13 overall, which was just one win shy of their program record set in 2023.

== Previous season ==
The Tigers finished the season 35–19 and 15–9 in ACC to finish in a tie for fourth place. As the fifth seed in the ACC Tournament they earned a bye into the Quarterfinals where they defeated Virginia, before losing to Duke in the Semifinals. The Tigers received an at-large bid to the NCAA Tournament and were placed in the Tuscaloosa regional. They lost to Southeastern Louisiana before defeating USC Upstate. They could not overcome a second elimination game and lost again to Southeastern Louisiana to end their season.

== Offseason moves ==
=== Departures ===
Departures
Name	B/T	Number	Pos.	Height	Year	Hometown	Reason for departure
Marena Knowles	L/L	00	1B/OF	6'10"	Sophomore	Hawkinsville, Georgia	—
Lindsey Garcia	R/R	5	INF/OF	5'5"	Graduate Student	Coral Springs, Florida	Graduated
Julia Bomhardt	L/R	6	OF	5'8"	Graduate Student	Dagsboro, Delaware	Graduated
McKenzie Clark	R/R	7	OF	5'5"	Graduate Student	Myakka City, Florida	Graduated
Grace Hiller	R/R	8	INF/OF	5'9"	(redshirt) Sophomore	Macon, Georgia	Graduated
Alia Logoleo	R/R	16	INF/OF	5'8"	(redshirt) Senior	Nashville, Tennessee	Graduated
Regan Spencer	R/R	19	RHP	5'11"	Senior	Lexington, North Carolina	Graduated
JoJo Hyatt	R/R	23	C	5'8"	(redshirt) Senior	Buford, Georgia	Graduated
Arielle Oda	L/R	24	INF/OF	5'4"	(redshirt) Senior	Buford, Georgia	Graduated
Valerie Cagle	L/R	72	RHP/UTIL	5'9"	(redshirt) Senior	Yorktown, Virginia	Graduated
Millie Thompson	L/L	87	LHP	5'7"	Senior	Bedford, Virginia	Graduated

=== Incoming transfers ===
Incoming transfers
Name	B/T	Number	Pos.	Height	Year	Hometown	Previous school
Reese Basinger	L/R	7	RHP	5'11"	Senior	Evans, Georgia	Winthrop
Jamison Brockenbrough	L/R	9	OF	5'8"	Junior	Locust Grove, Georgia	Tennessee
Brook Melnychuk	R/R	19	RHP	5'5"	Graduate Student	Hudson Bay, Saskatchewan	Louisiana Tech

=== Incoming recruits ===
Incoming Recruits
Name	B/T	Number	Pos.	Height	Hometown	High School
Marian Collins	L/R	5	INF	5'11"	Marietta, Georgia	Mount Paran
Madi Lardizabal	R/R	8	INF	5'8"	Murrieta, California	Murrieta Mesa
Macey Cintron	R/R	16	RHP/1B	5'11"	Cumming, Georgia	Wesleyan School
Ava Wilson	L/R	17	OF	5'9"	Acworth, Georgia	North Paulding
Sam Minish	L/L	20	OF	5'6"	Hull, Georgia	Madison County
Taylor Pipkins	R/R	22	INF	5'6"	Cumming, Georgia	North Forsyth
Riley Fennell	R/R	27	OF	5'8"	Oviedo, Florida	Oviedo

== Personnel ==
=== Roster ===
2025 Clemson Tigers softball team
Players
Coaches

#	Pos.	Name	Bats/throws	Height	Year	Home town
1	OF	Kennedy Ariail	R/R	5 ft 6 in (1.68 m)	So	Cumming, GA
2	RHP	Brooke McCubbin	R/R	5 ft 10 in (1.78 m)	Sr	Locust Grove, GA
3	OF	Kylee Johnson	R/R	5 ft 8 in (1.73 m)	So	Wesley Chapel, FL
4	C	Aby Vieira	L/R	5 ft 9 in (1.75 m)	Sr	Mission Viejo, CA
5	INF	Marian Collins	L/R	5 ft 11 in (1.8 m)	Fr	Marietta, GA
7	RHP	Reese Basinger	L/R	5 ft 11 in (1.8 m)	GS	Evans, GA
8	INF	Madi Lardizabal	R/R	5 ft 8 in (1.73 m)	Fr	Murrieta, CA
9	OF	Jamison Brockenbrough	L/R	5 ft 8 in (1.73 m)	Jr	Locust Grove, GA
10	C	Riley Burton	R/R	5 ft 11 in (1.8 m)	So	Lancaster, SC
11	INF	Haylee Whitesides	R/R	5 ft 5 in (1.65 m)	RS So	Duncan, SC
12	INF	Julia Knowler	L/R	5 ft 9 in (1.75 m)	So	Fort Myers, FL
13	C	Abi Stuart	R/R	5 ft 9 in (1.75 m)	RS Sr	Snow Camp, NC
16	RHP	Macey Cintron	R/R	5 ft 11 in (1.8 m)	Fr	Cumming, GA
17	OF	Ava Wilson	L/R	5 ft 9 in (1.75 m)	Fr	Acworth, GA
19	RHP	Brook Melnychuk	R/R	5 ft 5 in (1.65 m)	GS	Hudson Bay, Canada
20	OF	Sam Minish	L/L	5 ft 6 in (1.68 m)	Fr	Hull, GA
21	OF	Jadeyn Ruszkowski	L/L	5 ft 8 in (1.73 m)	RS Jr	Lithia, FL
22	INF	Taylor Pipkins	R/R	5 ft 6 in (1.68 m)	RS Fr	Cumming, GA
25	INF	Alex Brown	L/R	5 ft 7 in (1.7 m)	Sr	Savannah, GA
27	OF	Riley Fennell	R/R	5 ft 8 in (1.73 m)	Fr	Ovideo, FL
28	INF	Maddie Moore	R/R	5 ft 7 in (1.7 m)	Sr	Loomis, CA
44	LHP	Olivia Duncan	R/L	5 ft 10 in (1.78 m)	So	Buford, GA

Head coach

- John Rittman (New Mexico State)

Assistant coach(es)

- Kyle Jamieson (Brock)
- Katie Repole (Louisiana)
- Jessie Harper (Henderson State)

Legend

- (C) Team captain
- (S) Suspended
- (I) Ineligible
- Injured
- Current redshirt

Roster

== Schedule ==
Legend
	Clemson win
	Clemson loss
	Cancellation
**Bold**	Clemson team member
*	Non-Conference game
†	Make-Up Game

2025 Clemson Tigers softball game log (48–14)
Regular season (41–12)

February (12–6)
Date	Time (ET)	Opponent	Rank	Site/Stadium	Score	Win	Loss	Save	Attendance	Overall Record	ACC Record
Feb 6	11:00 a.m.	vs. Ole Miss*	No. 25	FAU Softball Stadium • Boca Raton, FL; FAU Tournament	**L** 2–3	Guachino (1–0)	**Basinger** (0–1)	None	135	0–1	–
Feb 6	2:00 p.m.	vs. Kansas*	No. 25	FAU Softball Stadium • Boca Raton, FL; FAU Tournament	**W** 4–3	**McCubbin** (1–0)	Ludwig (0–1)	**Basinger** (1)	–	1–1	–
Feb 7	6:00 p.m.	at Florida Atlantic*	No. 25	FAU Softball Stadium • Boca Raton, FL; FAU Tournament	**L** 2–6	Martinez (1–0)	**Basinger** (0–2)	None	861	1–2	–
Feb 8	11:15 a.m.	vs. Georgia State*	No. 25	FAU Softball Stadium • Boca Raton, FL; FAU Tournament	**W** 10–1 (6)	**Cintron** (1–0)	Stephens (0–1)	None	164	2–2	–
Feb 9	11:30 a.m.	vs. Missouri State*	No. 25	FAU Softball Stadium • Boca Raton, FL; FAU Tournament	**W** 13–0 (6)	**Melnychuk** (1–0)	Stephens (0–1)	None	164	3–2	–
Feb 11	6:00 p.m.	Furman*		McWhorter Stadium • Clemson, SC	Postponed to March 4, 2025						
Feb 13	1:00 p.m.	vs. No. 16 Missouri*		Eddie C. Moore Complex • Clearwater, FL; Shriners Children's Clearwater Invitational	**L** 6–10	McCann (2–0)	**Cintron** (1–1)	None	—	3–3	–
Feb 13	3:00 p.m.	vs. Auburn*		Eddie C. Moore Complex • Clearwater, FL; Shriners Children's Clearwater Invitational	**L** 3–6	Clemmons (3–0)	**McCubbin** (1–1)	Geurin (1)	—	3–4	–
Feb 14	1:00 p.m.	vs. No. 23 Kentucky*		Eddie C. Moore Complex • Clearwater, FL; Shriners Children's Clearwater Invitational	**L** 6–7	Lacatena (2–1)	**Cintron** (1–2)	Fall (1)	—	3–5	–
Feb 15	9:00 a.m.	vs. UCF*		Eddie C. Moore Complex • Clearwater, FL; Shriners Children's Clearwater Invitational	**L** 4–6 (8)	Kelton (3–0)	**McCubbin** (1–2)	None	—	3–6	–
Feb 16	10:00 a.m.	vs. Ohio State*		Eddie C. Moore Complex • Clearwater, FL; Shriners Children's Clearwater Invitational	**W** 11–3 (6)	**Basinger** (1–2)	Kay (2–1)	None	—	4–6	–
Feb 18	6:00 p.m.	Charlotte*		McWhorter Stadium • Clemson, SC	**W** 14–8	**Cintron** (2–2)	Yarnall (1–4)	None	1,474	5–6	–
Feb 21	12:30 p.m.	Elon*		McWhorter Stadium • Clemson, SC; Clemson Classic	**W** 4–3	**Cintron** (3–2)	Cherry (0–2)	None	1,525	6–6	–
Feb 21	3:00 p.m.	Villanova*		McWhorter Stadium • Clemson, SC; Clemson Classic	**W** 1–0 (8)	**Basinger** (2–2)	Kobryn (3–1)	None	1,567	7–6	–
Feb 22	3:00 p.m.	Marshall*		McWhorter Stadium • Clemson, SC; Clemson Classic	**W** 8–3	**McCubbin** (2–2)	King (2–2)	**Cintron** (1)	1,648	8–6	–
Feb 23	12:30 p.m.	Marshall*		McWhorter Stadium • Clemson, SC; Clemson Classic	**W** 8–0 (5)	**Basinger** (3–2)	Feringa (1–3)	None	1,530	9–6	–
Feb 26	4:00 p.m.	No. 10 Georgia*		McWhorter Stadium • Clemson, SC	**W** 5–3	**McCubbin** (3–2)	Roelling (4–1)	None	1,623	10–6	–
Feb 28	12:30 p.m.	Lafayette*		McWhorter Stadium • Clemson, SC; Tiger Invitational	**W** 11–3	**Melnychuk** (1–0)	Alvarez (0–5)	None	1,514	11–6	–
Feb 28	3:00 p.m.	East Carolina*		McWhorter Stadium • Clemson, SC; Tiger Invitational	**W** 6–2	**Cintron** (4–2)	Frost (4–4)	None	1,614	12–6	–

March (15–4)
Date	Time (ET)	Opponent	Rank	Site/Stadium	Score	Win	Loss	Save	Attendance	Overall Record	ACC Record
Mar 1	3:00 p.m.	Indiana*		McWhorter Stadium • Clemson, SC; Tiger Invitational	**W** 11–5	**Basinger** (4–2)	Berry (6–1)	None	1,706	13–6	–
Mar 2	12:30 p.m.	Indiana*		McWhorter Stadium • Clemson, SC; Tiger Invitational	**W** 8–0 (6)	**McCubbin** (4–2)	Reyes (4–2)	None	1,543	14–6	–
Mar 4 (Note: Originally scheduled for February 11, but delayed due to inclement weather)	6:00 p.m.	Furman		McWhorter Stadium • Clemson, SC; Tiger Invitational	**W** 12–0 (5)	**Basinger** (5–2)	O'Bryan (0–4)	None	1,684	15–6	–
Mar 5	3:00 p.m.	Charleston Southern*		McWhorter Stadium • Clemson, SC	**W** 7–0	**McCubbin** (5–2)	Lauffer (4–2)	None	650	16–6	–
Mar 5	5:00 p.m.	Charleston Southern*		McWhorter Stadium • Clemson, SC	**W** 12–0 (5)	**Cintron** (5–2)	Clopton (3–4)	None	1,321	17–6	–
Mar 7	6:00 p.m.	No. 14 Duke		McWhorter Stadium • Clemson, SC	**W** 12–4 (5)	**Basinger** (6–2)	Curd (5–4)	None	1,756	18–6	1–1
Mar 8	1:00 p.m.	No. 14 Duke		McWhorter Stadium • Clemson, SC	**L** 3–5	Curd (6–4)	**McCubbin** (5–3)	Drogemull (1)	2,021	18–7	1–1
Mar 9	12:00 p.m.	No. 14 Duke		McWhorter Stadium • Clemson, SC	**L** 1–2	Drogemuller (6–2)	**Basinger** (6–3)	None	1,523	18–8	1–2
Mar 14	6:00 p.m.	North Carolina		McWhorter Stadium • Clemson, SC	**W** 4–1	**Basinger** (7–3)	Dark (10–4)	None	1,593	19–8	2–2
Mar 15	1:00 p.m.	North Carolina		McWhorter Stadium • Clemson, SC	**L** 3–6	Rogers (4–0)	**McCubbin** (5–4)	Parrish (1)	1,804	19–9	2–3
Mar 16	1:00 p.m.	North Carolina		McWhorter Stadium • Clemson, SC	**W** 10–2 (6)	**Basinger** (8–3)	Harris (7–1)	None	1,553	20–9	3–3
Mar 19	3:00 p.m.	at Fordham*		Murphy Field • Bronx, NY	**W** 14–1 (5)	**Duncan** (1–0)	Watkins (4–4)	None	456	21–9	–
Mar 21	3:00 p.m.	at Syracuse		Skytop Softball Stadium • Syracuse, NY	**W** 8–1	**Basinger** (9–3)	Knight (7–5)	None	117	22–9	4–3
Mar 22	1:00 p.m.	at Syracuse		Skytop Softball Stadium • Syracuse, NY	**W** 10–0	**McCubbin** (6–4)	Verni (8–3)	None	99	23–9	5–3
Mar 23	12:00 p.m.	at Syracuse		Skytop Softball Stadium • Syracuse, NY	**W** 15–0 (5)	**Basinger** (10–3)	Knight (7–6)	None	106	24–9	6–3
Mar 25	6:00 p.m.	at No. 10 South Carolina*		Beckham Field • Columbia, SC (Rivalry)	**L** 0–6	Lamb (6–1)	**Basinger** (10–4)	None	1,640	24–10	–
Mar 28	6:00 p.m.	California		McWhorter Stadium • Clemson, SC	**W** 5–3	**Basinger** (11–4)	Reimers (5–1)	**McCubbin** (2)	1,623	25–10	7–3
Mar 29	2:30 p.m.	California		McWhorter Stadium • Clemson, SC	**W** 2–1	**McCubbin** (7–4)	De Nava (9–2)	None	1,426	26–10	8–3
Mar 29	6:00 p.m.	California		McWhorter Stadium • Clemson, SC	**W** 14–4 (5)	**Cintron** (6–2)	Reimers (5–2)	None	1,803	27–10	9–3

April (14–2)
Date	Time (ET)	Opponent	Rank	Site/Stadium	Score	Win	Loss	Save	Attendance	Overall Record	ACC Record
Apr 1	6:00 p.m.	Gardner–Webb*		McWhorter Stadium • Clemson, SC	**W** 11–3 (5)	**Duncan** (2–0)	Hornbaker (5–4)	None	1,502	28–10	–
Apr 4	9:00 p.m.	at No. 15 Stanford		Smith Family Stadium • Stanford, CA	**W** 7–5	**Basinger** (12–4)	Prystajko (8–3)	**McCubbin** (3)	915	29–10	10–3
Apr 5	5:00 p.m.	at No. 15 Stanford		Smith Family Stadium • Stanford, CA	**L** 1–11 (5)	Houston (8–1)	**McCubbin** (7–5)	None	945	29–11	10–4
Apr 6	3:00 p.m.	at No. 15 Stanford		Smith Family Stadium • Stanford, CA	**W** 7–6	**McCubbin** (8–5)	Chung (10–4)	None	1,174	30–11	11–4
Apr 9	6:00 p.m.	Winthrop*	No. 24	McWhorter Stadium • Clemson, SC	**W** 4–1	**Cintron** (7–2)	Powell (12–10)	None	1,504	31–11	–
Apr 11	7:00 p.m.	at NC State	No. 24	Dail Stadium • Raleigh, NC	**W** 17–3 (5)	**Basinger** (13–4)	Maxton (9–6)	None	547	32–11	12–4
Apr 12	5:00 p.m.	at NC State	No. 24	Dail Stadium • Raleigh, NC	**W** 8–7	**McCubbin** (9–5)	Maxton (9–7)	None	630	33–11	13–4
Apr 13	1:00 p.m.	at NC State	No. 24	Dail Stadium • Raleigh, NC	**W** 8–3	**Basinger** (14–4)	Maxton (9–8)	None	630	34–11	14–4
Apr 15	6:00 p.m.	No. 13 South Carolina*	No. 20	McWhorter Stadium • Clemson, SC; Rivalry	**W** 2–1 (9)	**McCubbin** (10–5)	Gress (8–7)	None	2,003	35–11	–
Apr 17	6:00 p.m.	Boston College	No. 20	McWhorter Stadium • Clemson, SC	**W** 6–2	**Basinger** (15–4)	Colleran (10–11)	**Cintron** (2)	1,445	36–11	15–4
Apr 18	6:00 p.m.	Boston College	No. 20	McWhorter Stadium • Clemson, SC	**W** 8–4	**Cintron** (8–2)	Kendziorski (6–10)	None	1,572	37–11	16–4
Apr 19	12:00 p.m.	Boston College	No. 20	McWhorter Stadium • Clemson, SC	**L** 2–5	Colleran (11–11)	**Basinger** (15–5)	None	1,589	37–12	16–5
Apr 22	6:00 p.m.	at No. 4 Tennessee	No. 19	Sherri Parker Lee Stadium • Knoxville, TN	**W** 4–3 (9)	**McCubbin** (11–5)	Pickens (18–5)	None	1,973	38–12	–
Apr 25	6:00 p.m.	at Georgia Tech	No. 19	Mewborn Field • Atlanta, GA	**W** 6–2	**Basinger** (16–5)	Voyles (11–7)	None	623	39–12	17–6
Apr 26	4:00 p.m.	at Georgia Tech	No. 19	Mewborn Field • Atlanta, GA	**W** 19–0 (5)	**McCubbin** (12–5)	Andres (0–1)	None	658	40–12	18–6
Apr 27	1:00 p.m.	at Georgia Tech	No. 19	Mewborn Field • Atlanta, GA	**W** 8–2	**McCubbin** (13–5)	Volyes (11–8)	None	589	41–12	19–6

Postseason (7–2)

ACC Tournament (3–0)
Date	Time (ET)	Seed	Rank	Opponent	Opponent Seed	Site/Stadium	Score	Win	Loss	Save	Attendance	Overall Record
May 8	5:00 p.m.	2	No. 15	vs. No. 25 Virginia	7	Boston College Softball Field • Chestnut Hill, MA	**W** 7–4	**McCubbin** (14–5)	Bigham (17–9)	None	783	42–12
May 9	12:30 p.m.	2	No. 15	vs. No. 13 Virginia Tech	3	Boston College Softball Field • Chestnut Hill, MA	**W** 10–9	**McCubbin** (15–5)	Lemley (17–7)	None	621	43–12
May 10	2:30 p.m.	2	No. 15	vs. No. 6 Florida State	1	Boston College Softball Field • Chestnut Hill, MA	**W** 2–1	**McCubbin** (16–5)	Francik (10–3)	None	1,200	44–12

NCAA Clemson Regional (3–0)
Date	Time (ET)	Regional Seed	Rank	Opponent	Opponent Regional Seed	Site/Stadium	Score	Win	Loss	Save	Attendance	Overall Record
May 16	4:30 p.m.	1	No. 13	USC Upstate	4	McWhorter Stadium • Clemson, SC	**W** 10–2 (5)	**McCubbin** (17–5)	Maness (21–8)	None	1,804	45–12
May 17	1:30 p.m.	1	No. 13	Northwestern	3	McWhorter Stadium • Clemson, SC	**W** 1–0 (9)	**McCubbin** (18–5)	Boyd (15–5)	None	1,313	46–12
May 18	1:00 p.m.	1	No. 13	Kentucky	2	McWhorter Stadium • Clemson, SC	**W** 5–1	**Basinger** (17–5)	Fall (6–9)	**McCubbin** (4)	2,116	47–12

NCAA Austin Super Regional (1–2)
Date	Time (ET)	National Seed	Rank	Opponent	Opponent National Seed	Site/Stadium	Score	Win	Loss	Save	Attendance	Overall Record
May 22	9:00 p.m.	11	No. 13	@ No. 3 Texas	6	Red and Charline McCombs Field • Austin, TX	**W** 7–4	**Basinger** (18–5)	Kavan (23–5)	**McCubbin** (5)	1,546	48–12
May 23	9:00 p.m.	11	No. 13	@ No. 3 Texas	6	Red and Charline McCombs Field • Austin, TX	**L** 5–7 (10)	Kavan (24–5)	**McCubbin** (18–6)	None	1,722	48–13
May 24	9:00 p.m.	11	No. 13	@ No. 3 Texas	6	Red and Charline McCombs Field • Austin, TX	**L** 5–6	Morgan (10–4)	**Basinger** (18–6)	None	1,729	48–14

Note: All rankings shown are from the NFCA/USA Today poll.

== Rankings ==
Ranking movements Legend: ██ Increase in ranking ██ Decrease in ranking — = Not ranked RV = Received votes т = Tied with team above or below
	Week															
Poll	Pre	1	2	3	4	5	6	7	8	9	10	11	12	13	14	Final
NFCA / USA Today	25	RV	RV	—	—	—	—	RV	RV	24	20	19	15	15	13	11
Softball America	—	—	—	—	25	—	—	25	21	16	15	15	11	10	10*	9
ESPN.com/USA Softball	RV	—	—	—	RV	RV	RV	RV	25	21	19	19	16	14т	13	11
D1Softball	—	—	—	—	22	—	RV	23	20	16	15	14	12	12	12*	9

* Various polls did not release during the NCAA tournament.
* indicates that the ranking is from pre-tournament for comparison purposes.
