= 2024 Clemson Tigers softball team =

American college softball season

2024 Clemson Tigers softball
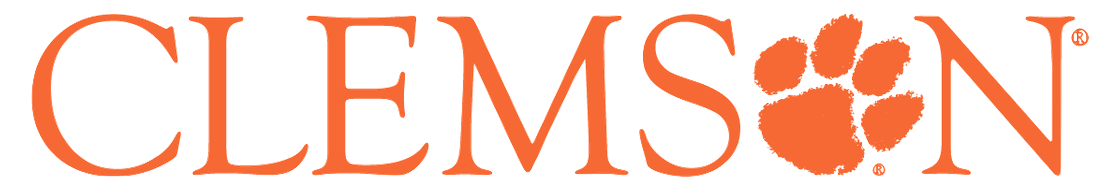

NCAA Tuscaloosa Regional
- Conference: Atlantic Coast Conference
- Record: 35–19 (15–9 ACC)
- Head coach: John Rittman (5th season)
- Assistant coaches: Kyle Jamieson (5th season); Courtney Breault (5th season); Jessie Harper (2nd season)
- Home stadium: McWhorter Stadium

2024 Atlantic Coast Conference softball standings
	Conf.						Overall
Team	W		L		T	PCT	W		L		T	PCT
No. 7 Duke ‍†‍‡‍^{y}	20	–	4	–	0	.833	52	–	9	–	0	.852
No. 13 Florida State ‍‍‍^{y}	19	–	5	–	0	.792	46	–	16	–	0	.742
No. 17 Virginia Tech ‍‍‍^{y}	18	–	6	–	0	.750	40	–	13	–	1	.750
Clemson ‍‍‍^{y}	15	–	9	–	0	.625	35	–	19	–	0	.648
Virginia ‍‍‍^{y}	15	–	9	–	0	.625	34	–	20	–	0	.630
Georgia Tech ‍‍‍	12	–	12	–	0	.500	32	–	23	–	0	.582
North Carolina ‍‍‍	10	–	14	–	0	.417	30	–	20	–	0	.600
Boston College ‍‍‍	9	–	15	–	0	.375	30	–	24	–	0	.556
Syracuse ‍‍‍	9	–	15	–	0	.375	28	–	23	–	0	.549
Notre Dame ‍‍‍	9	–	15	–	0	.375	27	–	23	–	0	.540
Louisville ‍‍‍	8	–	16	–	0	.333	27	–	25	–	0	.519
NC State ‍‍‍	6	–	18	–	0	.250	30	–	23	–	0	.566
Pittsburgh ‍‍‍	6	–	18	–	0	.250	17	–	32	–	0	.347
† – Conference champion ‡ – Tournament champion y – Invited to the NCAA Tournament; As of June 11, 2024; Rankings from NFCA/USA Today

The 2024 Clemson Tigers softball team was the varsity college softball team that represented Clemson University during the 2024 NCAA Division I softball season. This was the fifth season of Clemson's softball program. The Tigers competed in the Atlantic Coast Conference (ACC) and were led by head coach John Rittman. Clemson played its home games at McWhorter Stadium in Clemson, South Carolina.

The Tigers started the season with four straight wins at the NFCA Leadoff Classic, including one over fifteenth-ranked Oregon. They would lose the final game of the tournament against Missouri and fall from fifth to eighth in the rankings. The Tigers finished 2–1 in the Puerto Vallarta College Challenge as two of the games were cancelled due to weather. They won four games in the Clemson Classic before dropping a game to fifth-ranked Georgia in eight innings to finish February. In March, the Tigers won an ACC series against NC State before falling to eighth-ranked Tennessee. They went 4–1 in the Tiger Invitational, before winning ACC series against North Carolina and Boston College but dropping a series against Virginia. They also lost a rivalry matchup at home against twenty-third ranked South Carolina. They would avenge the loss at South Carolina on April 9. They swept an ACC series against Syracuse before being swept by Duke. They finished the season by winning two ACC series 2–1 against Notre Dame and Louisville.

The Tigers finished the season 35–19 and 15–9 in ACC to finish in a tie for fourth place. As the fifth seed in the ACC Tournament they earned a bye into the Quarterfinals where they defeated Virginia, before losing to Duke in the Semifinals. The Tigers received an at-large bid to the NCAA Tournament and were placed in the Tuscaloosa regional. They lost to Southeastern Louisiana before defeating USC Upstate. They could not overcome a second elimination game and lost again to Southeastern Louisiana to end their season.

== Previous season ==
The Tigers finished the regular season 45–8 and 18–6 in ACC play to finish in third place. As the third seed in the ACC Tournament, they earned a bye into the Quarter finals where the defeated North Carolina before losing to Duke in the Semifinals. The Tigers were selected, via at-large bid, as the sixteenth overall seed in the NCAA Tournament. They hosted a regional and were placed into the Norman Super Regional. They defeated UNC Greensboro and Auburn to earn a spot in the final of the Regional. They lost to Auburn in the first game, but won the second time to advance to the Super Regional. The Tigers lost both games to the eventual national champions Oklahoma Sooners in Norman to end their season.

== Personnel ==
=== Roster ===
2024 Clemson Tigers softball team
Players
Coaches

#	Pos.	Name	Bats/throws	Height	Year	Home town
00	C	Marena Knowles	L/L	5 ft 10 in (1.78 m)	So	Hawkinsville, GA
1	OF	Kennedy Ariail	R/R	5 ft 6 in (1.68 m)	Fr	Cumming, GA
2	RHP	Brooke McCubbin	R/R	5 ft 10 in (1.78 m)	Jr	Locust Grove, GA
3	OF	Kylee Johnson	R/R	5 ft 8 in (1.73 m)	Fr	Wesley Chapel, FL
4	C	Aby Vieira	L/R	5 ft 9 in (1.75 m)	Jr	Mission Viejo, CA
5	INF	Lindsey Garcia	R/R	5 ft 5 in (1.65 m)	GS	Coral Springs, FL
6	OF	Julia Bomhardt	L/R	5 ft 8 in (1.73 m)	GS	Dasboro, DE
7	OF	McKenzie Clark	R/R	5 ft 5 in (1.65 m)	Sr	Myakka City, FL
8	INF	Grace Hiller	R/R	5 ft 9 in (1.75 m)	RS So	Macon, GA
10	C	Riley Burton	R/R	5 ft 9 in (1.75 m)	Fr	Lancaster, SC
11	INF	Haylee Whitesides	R/R	5 ft 5 in (1.65 m)	RS Fr	Duncan, SC
12	INF	Julia Knowler	L/R	5 ft 9 in (1.75 m)	Fr	Fort Myers, FL
13	C	Abi Stuart	R/R	5 ft 9 in (1.75 m)	RS Jr	Snow Camp, NC
16	OF	Alia Logoleo	R/R	5 ft 8 in (1.73 m)	RS Sr	Nashville, TN
19	RHP	Regan Spencer	R/R	5 ft 11 in (1.8 m)	Sr	Lexington, NC
21	OF	Jadeyn Ruszkowski	L/L	5 ft 8 in (1.73 m)	RS So	Lithia, FL
23	C	JoJo Hyatt	R/R	5 ft 8 in (1.73 m)	RS Sr	Buford, GA
24	INF	Arielle Oda	L/R	5 ft 4 in (1.63 m)	RS Sr	Buford, GA
25	U	Alex Brown	L/R	5 ft 7 in (1.7 m)	Jr	Savannah, GA
28	INF	Maddie Moore	R/R	5 ft 7 in (1.7 m)	Jr	Loomis, CA
44	LHP	Olivia Duncan	R/L	5 ft 10 in (1.78 m)	Fr	Buford, GA
72	RHP	Valerie Cagle	L/R	5 ft 9 in (1.75 m)	RS Sr	Yorktown, VA
87	LHP	Millie Thompson	L/L	5 ft 7 in (1.7 m)	Sr	Bedford, VA

Head coach

- John Rittman (New Mexico State)

Assistant coach(es)

- Kyle Jamieson (Brock)
- Courtney Breault (Nebraska)
- Jessie Harper (Arizona)

Legend

- (C) Team captain
- (S) Suspended
- (I) Ineligible
- Injured
- Current redshirt

Roster
Last update: April 12, 2024

== Schedule ==
Legend
	Clemson win
	Clemson loss
	Cancellation
**Bold**	Clemson team member
*	Non-Conference game
†	Make-Up Game

2024 Clemson Tigers softball game log
Regular season

February (11–3)
Date	Time (ET)	Opponent	Rank	Site/Stadium	Score	Win	Loss	Save	Attendance	Overall Record	ACC Record
Feb 8	7:00 p.m.	vs. Missouri State*	No. 5	Eddie C. Moore Complex • Clearwater, FL (NFCA Leadoff Classic)	**W** 12–0 (5)	**McCubbin** (1–0)	Johnston (0–1)	None	N/A	1–0	–
Feb 9	7:00 p.m.	vs. Indiana*	No. 5	Eddie C. Moore Complex • Clearwater, FL (NFCA Leadoff Classic)	**W** 3–2	**Thompson** (1–0)	Copeland (1–1)	**Cagle** (1)	323	2–0	–
Feb 10	4:00 p.m.	vs. Liberty*	No. 5	Eddie C. Moore Complex • Clearwater, FL (NFCA Leadoff Classic)	**W** 7–3	**McCubbin** (2–0)	Love (0–1)	None	453	3–0	–
Feb 10	7:00 p.m.	vs. No. 15 Oregon*	No. 5	Eddie C. Moore Complex • Clearwater, FL (NFCA Leadoff Classic)	**W** 3–2	**Cagle** (1–0)	Scott (1–1)	None	622	4–0	–
Feb 11	1:00 a.m.	vs. Missouri*	No. 5	Eddie C. Moore Complex • Clearwater, FL (NFCA Leadoff Classic)	**L** 1–4	Krings (3–0)	**McCubbin** (2–1)	None	573	4–1	–
Feb 14	12:00 p.m.	vs. Wichita State*	No. 8	Nancy Almaraz Field • Puerto Vallarta, Mexico (Puerto Vallarta College Challenge)	**W** 7–0	**Cagle** (2–0)	Cooper (0–1)	None	231	5–1	–
Feb 14	2:30 p.m.	vs. UC San Diego*	No. 8	Nancy Almaraz Field • Puerto Vallarta, Mexico (Puerto Vallarta College Challenge)	**W** 6–4	**McCubbin** (3–1)	Williams (0–1)	**Cagle** (2)	187	6–1	–
Feb 16	7:00 p.m.	vs. Utah*	No. 8	Nancy Almaraz Field • Puerto Vallarta, Mexico (Puerto Vallarta College Challenge)	Cancelled						
Feb 17	4:00 p.m.	vs. No. 25 Auburn*	No. 8	Nancy Almaraz Field • Puerto Vallarta, Mexico (Puerto Vallarta College Challenge)	Cancelled						
Feb 17	9:30 p.m.	vs. Mississippi State*	No. 8	Nancy Almaraz Field • Puerto Vallarta, Mexico (Puerto Vallarta College Challenge)	**L** 3–6	Wesley (3–0)	**Cagle** (2–1)	None	312	6–2	–
Feb 21	6:00 p.m.	at Charlotte*	No. 9	Sue M. Daughtridge Stadium • Charlotte, NC	**W** 8–5	**McCubbin** (4–1)	Elkins (2–2)	None	950	7–2	–
Feb 23	4:00 p.m.	Ole Miss*	No. 9	McWhorter Stadium • Clemson, SC (Clemson Classic)	**W** 9–1 (6)	**Cagle** (3–1)	Kliethermes (4–1)	None	2,049	8–2	–
Feb 24	1:30 p.m.	Miami (OH)*	No. 9	McWhorter Stadium • Clemson, SC (Clemson Classic)	**W** 10–1 (5)	**McCubbin** (5–1)	Hitchcock (2–1)	None	1,522	9–2	–
Feb 24	4:00 p.m.	Connecticut*	No. 9	McWhorter Stadium • Clemson, SC (Clemson Classic)	**W** 3–2 (8)	**Cagle** (4–1)	O'Neil (1–3)	None	2,116	10–2	–
Feb 25	12:30 p.m.	Ole Miss*	No. 9	McWhorter Stadium • Clemson, SC (Clemson Classic)	**W** 5–0	**Cagle** (5–1)	Furbush (1–1)	None	1,766	11–2	–
Feb 28	5:00 p.m.	at No. 5 Georgia*	No. 8	Jack Turner Stadium • Athens, GA	**L** 1–2 (8)	Backes (4–0)	**Cagle** (5–2)	None	864	11–3	–

March (13–7)
Date	Time (ET)	Opponent	Rank	Site/Stadium	Score	Win	Loss	Save	Attendance	Overall Record	ACC Record
Mar 2	1:00 p.m.	NC State	No. 8	McWhorter Stadium • Clemson, SC	**L** 1–6	Weixlmann (6–1)	**McCubbin** (5–2)	None	1,868	11–4	0–1
Mar 2	3:00 p.m.	NC State	No. 8	McWhorter Stadium • Clemson, SC	**W** 8–0 (5)	**Cagle** (6–2)	Wyman (3–2)	None	1,973	12–4	1–1
Mar 3	12:00 p.m.	NC State	No. 8	McWhorter Stadium • Clemson, SC	**W** 14–9	**Spencer** (1–0)	Inscoe (3–2)	**McCubbin** (1)	1,832	13–4	2–1
Mar 5	6:00 p.m.	No. 8 Tennessee*	No. 10	McWhorter Stadium • Clemson, SC	**L** 1–2 (9)	Pickens (8–2)	**Cagle** (6–3)	None	1,883	13–5	–
Mar 7	4:00 p.m.	Minnesota*	No. 10	McWhorter Stadium • Clemson, SC (Tiger Invitational)	**L** 3–5 (9)	Enter (6–3)	**Cagle** (6–4)	None	1,678	13–6	–
Mar 7	6:00 p.m.	Minnesota*	No. 10	McWhorter Stadium • Clemson, SC (Tiger Invitational)	**W** 3–1	**Spencer** (2–0)	Richardson (0–1)	None	1,698	14–6	–
Mar 8	6:00 p.m.	Mercer*	No. 10	McWhorter Stadium • Clemson, SC (Tiger Invitational)	**W** 7–2	**Thompson** (2–0)	Pitts (1–3)	None	1,761	15–6	–
Mar 9	6:00 p.m.	Longwood*	No. 10	McWhorter Stadium • Clemson, SC (Tiger Invitational)	**W** 9–1 (6)	**Cagle** (7–4)	Chapin (7–6)	None	1,912	16–6	–
Mar 10	12:30 p.m.	Fordham*	No. 10	McWhorter Stadium • Clemson, SC (Tiger Invitational)	**W** 12–0	**Spencer** (3–0)	Simcoe (0–4)	None	1,842	17–6	–
Mar 13	6:00 p.m.	Gardner–Webb*	No. 12	McWhorter Stadium • Clemson, SC	**W** 8–0 (5)	**Thompson** (3–0)	Lyon (8–3)	None	1,702	18–6	–
Mar 15	6:00 p.m.	North Carolina	No. 12	McWhorter Stadium • Clemson, SC	**W** 5–0	**Spencer** (4–0)	Harris (5–3)	None	1,826	19–6	3–1
Mar 16	1:00 p.m.	North Carolina	No. 12	McWhorter Stadium • Clemson, SC	**W** 4–1	**Thompson** (4–0)	Dark (4–1)	None	1,916	20–6	4–1
Mar 17	7:00 p.m.	North Carolina	No. 12	McWhorter Stadium • Clemson, SC	**W** 9–1 (5)	**McCubbin** (6–2)	Rogers (8–1)	None	1,769	21–6	5–1
Mar 20	6:00 p.m.	No. 23 South Carolina*	No. 11	McWhorter Stadium • Clemson, SC (Rivalry)	**L** 4–6 (12)	Vawter (8–4)	**Thompson** (4–1)	None	1,867	21–7	–
Mar 22	5:00 p.m.	at Virginia	No. 11	Palmer Park • Charlottesville, VA	**L** 4–6	Marris (5–1)	**Cagle** (7–5)	Eigham (2)	702	21–8	5–2
Mar 23	1:00 p.m.	at Virginia	No. 11	Palmer Park • Charlottesville, VA	**W** 5–1	**Spencer** (5–0)	Bigham (7–6)	None	1,122	22–8	6–2
Mar 24	12:00 p.m.	at Virginia	No. 11	Palmer Park • Charlottesville, VA	**L** 0–3	Harris (6–1)	**Thompson** (4–2)	None	1,019	22–9	6–3
Mar 26	5:00 p.m.	Georgia State*	No. 16	McWhorter Stadium • Clemson, SC	Cancelled						
Mar 28	6:00 p.m.	Boston College	No. 16	McWhorter Stadium • Clemson, SC	**W** 10–2 (5)	**Spencer** (6–0)	Dunning (9–6)	None	1,764	23–9	7–3
Mar 29	1:00 p.m.	Boston College	No. 16	McWhorter Stadium • Clemson, SC	**L** 0–4	Dunning (10–6)	**Thompson** (4–3)	None	1,914	23–10	7–4
Mar 30	12:00 p.m.	Boston College	No. 16	McWhorter Stadium • Clemson, SC	**W** 10–0 (5)	**McCubbin** (7–2)	Pappion (7–4)	**Spencer** (1)	2,116	24–10	8–4

April (9–6)
Date	Time (ET)	Opponent	Rank	Site/Stadium	Score	Win	Loss	Save	Attendance	Overall Record	ACC Record
Apr 2	6:00 p.m.	Furman*	No. 17	McWhorter Stadium • Clemson, SC	**L** 3–4	L. Scott (7–2)	**Thompson** (4–4)	None	1,819	24–11	–
Apr 6	4:00 p.m.	at Syracuse	No. 17	Softball Stadium at Skytop • Syracuse, NY	**W** 13–2 (5)	**Spencer** (7–0)	Hendrix (7–3)	None	153	25–11	9–4
Apr 7	10:00 a.m.	at Syracuse	No. 17	Softball Stadium at Skytop • Syracuse, NY	**W** 10–1 (6)	**Thompson** (5–4)	Lewinski (2–6)	None	174	26–11	10–4
Apr 7	12:00 p.m.	at Syracuse	No. 17	Softball Stadium at Skytop • Syracuse, NY	**W** 7–1	**McCubbin** (8–2)	Knight (3–5)	None	174	27–11	11–4
Apr 9	6:00 p.m.	at No. 23 South Carolina*	No. 19	Beckham Field • Columbia, SC (Rivalry)	**W** 7–0	**Spencer** (8–0)	Mardjetko (6–6)	**Thompson** (1)	2,055	28–11	–
Apr 12	6:00 p.m.	No. 3 Duke	No. 19	McWhorter Stadium • Clemson, SC	**L** 9–13	Walker (10–1)	**Spencer** (8–1)	None	1,915	28–12	11–5
Apr 13	1:00 p.m.	No. 3 Duke	No. 19	McWhorter Stadium • Clemson, SC	**L** 3–4	Wright (13–1)	**Thompson** (5–5)	Walker (3)	2,116	28–13	11–6
Apr 14	12:00 p.m.	No. 3 Duke	No. 19	McWhorter Stadium • Clemson, SC	**L** 1–6	Curd (8–2)	**Spencer** (8–2)	Wright (1)	1,940	28–14	11–7
Apr 16	6:00 p.m.	Winthrop*	No. 21	McWhorter Stadium • Clemson, SC	**W** 4–0	**McCubbin** (9–2)	Basinger (9–13)	None	1,592	29–14	–
Apr 19	5:00 p.m.	at Notre Dame	No. 21	Melissa Cook Stadium • Notre Dame, IN	**W** 8–5 (10)	**McCubbin** (10–2)	Kastor (8–8)	None	438	30–14	12–7
Apr 20	1:00 p.m.	at Notre Dame	No. 21	Melissa Cook Stadium • Notre Dame, IN	**W** 11–6	**Cagle** 8–5	Laudenslager (9–7)	None	534	31–14	13–7
Apr 21	6:00 p.m.	at Notre Dame	No. 21	Melissa Cook Stadium • Notre Dame, IN	**L** 5–6	Becker (7–5)	**Spencer** (8–3)	None	312	31–15	13–8
Apr 26	6:00 p.m.	at Louisville	No. 22	Ulmer Stadium • Louisville, KY	**W** 6–5	**Thompson** (6–5)	Zabala (18–13)	None	356	32–15	14–8
Apr 27	1:00 p.m.	at Louisville	No. 22	Ulmer Stadium • Louisville, KY	**L** 3–6	Booe (3–3)	**Cagle** 8–6	None	389	32–16	14–9
Apr 28	12:00 p.m.	at Louisville	No. 22	Ulmer Stadium • Louisville, KY	**W** 11–5	**Spencer** (9–3)	Zabala (18–14)	None	446	33–16	15–9

Postseason

ACC Tournament (1–1)
Date	Time (ET)	Seed	Rank	Opponent	Opponent Seed	Site/Stadium	Score	Win	Loss	Save	Attendance	Overall Record
May 9	1:30 p.m.	5	No. 23	vs. Virginia	4	Duke Softball Stadium • Durham, North Carolina	**W** 8–1	**Spencer** (10–3)	Layne (3–2)	None	327	34–16
May 10	1:00 p.m.	5	No. 23	at No. 4 Duke	1	Duke Softball Stadium • Durham, North Carolina	**L** 3–4 (10)	Walker (12–2)	**Spencer** (10–4)	None	726	34–17

NCAA Tuscaloosa Regional (1–2)
Date	Time (ET)	Seed	Rank	Opponent	Opponent Seed	Site/Stadium	Score	Win	Loss	Save	Attendance	Overall Record
May 17	2:00 p.m.	2	No. 23	vs. Southeastern Louisiana	3	Rhoads Stadium • Tuscaloosa, Alabama	**L** 2–6	DuBois (15–5)	**Cagle** (8–7)	None	2,184	34–18
May 18	2:00 p.m.	2	No. 23	vs. USC Upstate	4	Rhoads Stadium • Tuscaloosa, Alabama	**W** 8–0 (6)	**Spencer** (11–4)	Drerup (10–10)	None	2,217	35–18
May 18	9:00 p.m.	2	No. 23	vs. Southeastern Louisiana	3	Rhoads Stadium • Tuscaloosa, Alabama	**L** 2–6	DuBois (16–5)	**McCubbin** (10–3)	None	2,217	35–19

Note: All rankings shown are from the NFCA/USA Today poll.

== Rankings ==
Ranking movements Legend: ██ Increase in ranking ██ Decrease in ranking — = Not ranked RV = Received votes т = Tied with team above or below
	Week															
Poll	Pre	1	2	3	4	5	6	7	8	9	10	11	12	13	14	Final
NFCA / USA Today	5	8	9	8	10	12	11	16	17	19	21	22	23	23	23	RV
Softball America	5	6	9	9	10	16	13	21	20	25	—	—	—	—	—*	—
ESPN.com/USA Softball	7	7	9	9	11	14	11	16	17	19	20т	21	22	21	21	24
D1Softball	7	10	10	10	11	13	11	15	15	19	22	—	—	—	—*	—

- Various polls did not release during the NCAA tournament.
  * indicates that the ranking is from pre-tournament for comparison purposes.
