= Clemson Tigers softball =

Clemson Tigers
- 2026 Clemson Tigers softball team
- Founded: 2020 (7 years ago)
- University: Clemson University
- Athletic director: Graham Neff
- Head coach: John Rittman (7th season)
- Conference: ACC; Atlantic Division
- Location: Clemson, South Carolina, US
- Home stadium: McWhorter Stadium (capacity: 1,000)
- Nickname: Tigers
- Colors: Orange and regalia

NCAA super regional appearances
- 2022, 2023, 2025

NCAA Tournament appearances
- 2021, 2022, 2023, 2024, 2025, 2026

Conference tournament championships
- 2025

Regular-season conference championships
- 2021

Clemson Tigers softball joined the Atlantic Coast Conference as a Division I varsity program in 2020. In November 2017, former Stanford coach John Rittman was named as Clemson's first head softball coach. Rittman spent the previous two years as an assistant coach at Kansas and USA Softball.

== History ==
=== Coaching history ===
Years	Coach	Record	%
2020–present	John Rittman	271–100	.730

=== 2020s ===
The Tigers' first season was impacted by the COVID-19 pandemic. The Tigers had started 19–8 overall and 5–1 in ACC play before the season was cancelled by Clemson and the ACC. The NCAA tournament was also canceled. 2021 was Clemson's first full season as a program and they finished 44–8 overall, with a 29–5 record in ACC play. They won the regular season championship, and made the final of the ACC tournament but fell short in the final, losing to Duke. They could not advance past the Regional in the NCAA Tournament. They were placed in a Regional with SEC champion Alabama and lost both games against the Crimson Tide. The program's success would continue in 2022 as they would finish 14–10 in ACC play to finish in fifth place. Despite their lower seed, they again reached the final of the ACC tournament, but could not overcome Florida State in the Final. They were selected to host a regional in the NCAA Tournament and won three games without allowing a run, to advance to the Super Regional. During the 2023 season, Clemson had its first perfect game in program history. Valerie Cagle recorded the perfect game by retiring all fifteen batters she faced in an 18–0 (5 inning) win over Mercer. The 2024 season, was a down season by Clemson's lofty standards. The team finished with its lowest overall win total in a full season. However, they did keep their streak of NCAA tournament appearances alive, but did not advance past the regional round. in 2025 the Tigers got off to a slow start, but rebounded to finish as runner up during the ACC regular season. They would go on to win the ACC Tournament over Florida State 2–1. They continued their streak of advancing to the NCAA tournament to five straight years. There they advanced out of their regional as host. They won their first Super Regional game in program history over Texas, but could not advance to the College World Series, losing the next two games.

== Coaching staff ==
Name	Position coached	Consecutive season at Clemson in current position
John Rittman	Head coach	7th
Kyle Jamieson	Associate head coach	7th
Katie Repole	Assistant coach	2nd
Ryan Wieligman	Assistant coach	2nd
Taylor Roby	Director of Player Development	3rd
Jeannie Murphy	Director of Operations	7th

== Year-by-year record ==
Record table
Season	Team	Overall	Conference	Standing	Postseason
John Rittman (Atlantic Coast Conference) (2020–present)
2020	Clemson	19–8	5–1	3rd	Season canceled due to COVID-19
2021	Clemson	44–8	29–5	1st	Tuscaloosa Regional
2022	Clemson	42–17	14–10	5th	Stillwater Super Regional
2023	Clemson	49–12	18–6	3rd	Norman Super Regional
2024	Clemson	35–19	15–9	T–4th	Tuscaloosa Regional
2025	Clemson	48–14	19–5	2nd	Austin Super Regional
2026	Clemson	34–22	13–11	7th	Athens Regional
John Rittman:		271–100 (.730)	113–47 (.706)		
Total:		271–100 (.730)			
National champion Postseason invitational champion Conference regular season champion Conference regular season and conference tournament champion Division regular season champion Division regular season and conference tournament champion Conference tournament champion

== Awards ==
=== National awards ===
USA Softball Collegiate Player of the Year

- Valerie Cagle (2023)

Softball America Player of the Year

- Valerie Cagle (2023)

=== Conference awards ===
ACC Player of the Year

- Valerie Cagle (2021, 2023)

ACC Pitcher of the Year

- Reese Basinger (2025)

ACC Freshman of the Year

- Valerie Cagle (2021)
- Macey Cintron (2025)

ACC Coach of the Year

- John Rittman (2021)

=== All-Americans ===
- NCFA 1st Team: Valerie Cagle (2022, 2023, 2024)
- NCFA 2nd Team: Valerie Cagle (2021)
- NFCA 3rd Team: Maddie Moore (2024)

== See also ==
- List of NCAA Division I softball programs
