= 2025 Atlantic Coast Conference softball tournament =

- Teams: 12
- Format: Single-elimination tournament
- Finals site: Boston College Softball Field; Chestnut Hill, Massachusetts
- Champions: Clemson (1st title)
- Runner-up: Florida State (8th title game)
- Winning coach: John Rittman (1st title)
- MVP: Taylor Pipkins (Clemson)
- Attendance: 5,855
- Television: ACCN; ESPN

2025 Atlantic Coast Conference softball standings
	Conf.						Overall
Team	W		L		T	PCT	W		L		T	PCT
No. 5 Florida State ‍†‍‍^{y}	18	–	3	–	0	.857	49	–	12	–	0	.803
No. 13 Clemson ‍‍‡‍^{y}	19	–	5	–	0	.792	48	–	14	–	0	.774
No. 15 Virginia Tech ‍‍‍^{y}	18	–	6	–	0	.750	43	–	13	–	0	.768
No. 16 Stanford ‍‍‍^{y}	16	–	8	–	0	.667	42	–	11	–	0	.792
No. 21 Duke ‍‍‍^{y}	16	–	8	–	0	.667	41	–	18	–	0	.695
North Carolina ‍‍‍^{y}	15	–	9	–	0	.625	40	–	17	–	0	.702
No. 25 Virginia ‍‍‍^{y}	14	–	10	–	0	.583	38	–	19	–	0	.667
Georgia Tech ‍‍‍^{y}	10	–	11	–	0	.476	27	–	24	–	0	.529
California ‍‍‍^{y}	11	–	13	–	0	.458	37	–	21	–	0	.638
Louisville ‍‍‍	9	–	15	–	0	.375	26	–	25	–	0	.510
Notre Dame ‍‍‍	7	–	17	–	0	.292	23	–	31	–	1	.427
Pittsburgh ‍‍‍	7	–	17	–	0	.292	20	–	32	–	0	.385
Syracuse ‍‍‍	6	–	18	–	0	.250	27	–	22	–	0	.551
NC State ‍‍‍	6	–	18	–	0	.250	25	–	29	–	0	.463
Boston College ‍‍‍	5	–	19	–	0	.208	22	–	29	–	0	.431
† – Conference champion ‡ – Tournament champion y – Invited to the NCAA Tournament; As of May 24, 2025; Rankings from NFCA/USA Today

The 2025 Atlantic Coast Conference (ACC) softball tournament was held at Boston College Softball Field on the campus of the Boston College in Chestnut Hill, Massachusetts, from May 7 through May 10, 2025. The event determines the champion of the Atlantic Coast Conference for the 2025 season.

This was the first year of a 12-team tournament. The 1st round, quarterfinals and semifinals will be broadcast on the ACC Network. The championship game was broadcast by ESPN.

Duke entered as the defending tournament champions. They finished tied for fourth after the regular season and were the fourth seed in the tournament. They were unable to defend their title as they were defeated 3–2 by top seed Florida State in the Semifinals. Second-seed Clemson went on to defeat Florida State in the Final 2–1. The tournament title was the first in program history for Clemson, and the first for head coach John Rittman. As tournament champions, Clemson earned the ACC's automatic bid to the 2025 NCAA Division I softball tournament.

== Seeding ==
The top 12 finishers of the ACC's 15 softball-playing members were seeded based on conference results from the regular season. The top four seeds earned a bye into the quarterfinals.

Team	W	L	Pct.	GB	Seed
Florida State	18	3	.857	—	1
Clemson	19	5	.792	0.5	2
Virginia Tech	18	6	.750	1.5	3
Duke	16	8	.667	3.5	4
Stanford	16	8	.667	3.5	5
North Carolina	15	9	.625	4.5	6
Virginia	14	10	.583	5.5	7
Georgia Tech	10	11	.476	8	8
California	11	13	.458	8.5	9
Louisville	9	15	.375	10.5	10
Notre Dame	7	17	.292	12.5	11
Pittsburgh	7	17	.292	12.5	12
Syracuse	6	18	.250	13.5	DNQ
NC State	6	18	.250	13.5	DNQ
Boston College	5	19	.208	14.5	DNQ

== Tournament ==
=== Bracket ===
First round
8	Georgia Tech	8^{(5)}
9	California	0
5	Stanford	9
12	Pittsburgh	2
7	Virginia	3
10	Louisville	2
6	North Carolina	2
11	Notre Dame	0

Quarter-finals
1	Florida State	8^{(6)}
8	Georgia Tech	0
4	Duke	7
5	Stanford	0
2	Clemson	7
7	Virginia	4
3	Virginia Tech	4
6	North Carolina	0

Semi-finals
1	Florida State	3
4	Duke	2
2	Clemson	10
3	Virginia Tech	9

Final
1	Florida State	1
2	Clemson	2

=== Schedule and results ===
==== Schedule ====
Game	Time	Matchup	Score	Television	Attendance
First round – Wednesday, May 7
1	11:00 a.m.	No. 9 California vs. No. 8 Georgia Tech	0–8^{(5)}	ACCN	341
2	1:30 p.m.	No. 12 Pittsburgh vs. No. 5 Stanford	2–9	ACCN	389
3	5:00 p.m.	No. 10 Louisville vs. No. 7 Virginia	2–3	ACCN	310
4	7:30 p.m.	No. 11 Notre Dame vs. No. 6 North Carolina	0–2	ACCN	309
Quarterfinals – Thursday, May 8
5	11:00 a.m.	No. 8 Georgia Tech vs. No. 1 Florida State	0–8^{(6)}	ACCN	350
6	1:30 p.m.	No. 5 Stanford vs. No. 4 Duke	0–7	ACCN	375
7	5:00 p.m.	No. 7 Virginia vs. No. 2 Clemson	4–7	ACCN	783
8	7:30 p.m.	No. 6 North Carolina vs. No. 3 Virginia Tech	0–4	ACCN	533
Semifinals – Friday, May 9
9	10:00 a.m.	No. 4 Duke vs. No. 1 Florida State	2–3	ACCN	653
10	12:30 p.m.	No. 3 Virginia Tech vs. No. 2 Clemson	9–10	ACCN	612
Championship – Saturday, May 10
11	2:30 p.m.	No. 2 Clemson vs. No. 1 Florida State	2–1	ESPN	1,200

==== Game summaries ====
===== First Round =====
May 7; 11:00 a.m. EST; Game 1	(9) California	0–8 (F/5)	(8) Georgia Tech	Boston College Softball Field; Attendance: 341; Umpires: HP: Tatem Stoelting, 1B: Craig Hyde, 2B: Jim Cooper, 3B: Don Brown
May 7; 11:00 a.m. EST; Game 1	LP: Anna Reimers (7–5)	Boxscore	WP: Sophia Voyles (12–8)	Boston College Softball Field; Attendance: 341; Umpires: HP: Tatem Stoelting, 1B: Craig Hyde, 2B: Jim Cooper, 3B: Don Brown
May 7; 11:00 a.m. EST; Game 1		Boxscore	HR: Leschber (7)	Boston College Softball Field; Attendance: 341; Umpires: HP: Tatem Stoelting, 1B: Craig Hyde, 2B: Jim Cooper, 3B: Don Brown

May 7; 1:30 p.m. EST; Game 2	(12) Pittsburgh	2–9	(5) Stanford	Boston College Softball Field; Attendance: 389; Umpires: HP: Rick Cowan, 1B: Roger Potts, 2B: Scott Mair, 3B: Alex Leap
May 7; 1:30 p.m. EST; Game 2	LP: Gwen Sparks (7–7)	Boxscore	WP: Kylie Chung (14–5)	Boston College Softball Field; Attendance: 389; Umpires: HP: Rick Cowan, 1B: Roger Potts, 2B: Scott Mair, 3B: Alex Leap
May 7; 1:30 p.m. EST; Game 2		Boxscore	HR: Clements (7)	Boston College Softball Field; Attendance: 389; Umpires: HP: Rick Cowan, 1B: Roger Potts, 2B: Scott Mair, 3B: Alex Leap

May 7; 5:00 p.m. EST; Game 3	(10) Louisville	2–3	(7) Virginia	Boston College Softball Field; Attendance: 310; Umpires: HP: Craig Hyde, 1B: Jim Cooper, 2B: Don Brown, 3B: Tatem Stoelting
May 7; 5:00 p.m. EST; Game 3	LP: Alyssa Zabala (10–11)	Boxscore	WP: Eden Bigham (17–8)	Boston College Softball Field; Attendance: 310; Umpires: HP: Craig Hyde, 1B: Jim Cooper, 2B: Don Brown, 3B: Tatem Stoelting

May 7; 7:30 p.m. EST; Game 4	(11) Notre Dame	0–2	(6) North Carolina	Boston College Softball Field; Attendance: 309; Umpires: HP: Roger Potts, 1B: Scott Mair, 2B: Alex Leap, 3B: Rick Cowan
May 7; 7:30 p.m. EST; Game 4	LP: Micaela Kastor (10–9)	Boxscore	WP: Kenna Raye Dark (18–7)	Boston College Softball Field; Attendance: 309; Umpires: HP: Roger Potts, 1B: Scott Mair, 2B: Alex Leap, 3B: Rick Cowan

===== Quarterfinals =====
May 8; 11:00 a.m. EST; Game 5	(8) Georgia Tech	0–8 (F/6)	(1) Florida State	Boston College Softball Field; Attendance: 350; Umpires: HP: Jim Cooper, 1B: Don Brown, 2B: Tatem Stoelting, 3B: Craig Hyde
May 8; 11:00 a.m. EST; Game 5	LP: Kinsey Norton (3–6)	Boxscore	WP: Ashtyn Danley (12–1)	Boston College Softball Field; Attendance: 350; Umpires: HP: Jim Cooper, 1B: Don Brown, 2B: Tatem Stoelting, 3B: Craig Hyde
May 8; 11:00 a.m. EST; Game 5		Boxscore	HR: Dack (14), Kerr (9)	Boston College Softball Field; Attendance: 350; Umpires: HP: Jim Cooper, 1B: Don Brown, 2B: Tatem Stoelting, 3B: Craig Hyde

May 8; 1:30 p.m. EST; Game 6	(5) Stanford	0–7	(4) Duke	Boston College Softball Field; Attendance: 375; Umpires: HP: Scott Mair, 1B: Alex Leap, 2B: Rick Cowan, 3B: Roger Potts
May 8; 1:30 p.m. EST; Game 6	LP: Alyssa Houston (14–2)	Boxscore	WP: Dani Drogemuller (17–7)	Boston College Softball Field; Attendance: 375; Umpires: HP: Scott Mair, 1B: Alex Leap, 2B: Rick Cowan, 3B: Roger Potts
May 8; 1:30 p.m. EST; Game 6		Boxscore	HR: Rodriguez (8)	Boston College Softball Field; Attendance: 375; Umpires: HP: Scott Mair, 1B: Alex Leap, 2B: Rick Cowan, 3B: Roger Potts

May 8; 5:00 p.m. EST; Game 7	(7) Virginia	4–7	(2) Clemson	Boston College Softball Field; Attendance: 783; Umpires: HP: Don Brown, 1B: Tatem Stoelting, 2B: Craig Hyde, 3B: Jim Cooper
May 8; 5:00 p.m. EST; Game 7	LP: Eden Bigham (17–9)	Boxscore	WP: Brooke McCubbin (14–5)	Boston College Softball Field; Attendance: 783; Umpires: HP: Don Brown, 1B: Tatem Stoelting, 2B: Craig Hyde, 3B: Jim Cooper
May 8; 5:00 p.m. EST; Game 7		Boxscore	HR: Moore (16), Pipkins (3)	Boston College Softball Field; Attendance: 783; Umpires: HP: Don Brown, 1B: Tatem Stoelting, 2B: Craig Hyde, 3B: Jim Cooper

May 8; 7:30 p.m. EST; Game 8	(6) North Carolina	0–4	(3) Virginia Tech	Boston College Softball Field; Attendance: 533; Umpires: HP: Alex Leap, 1B: Rick Cowan, 2B: Roger Potts, 3B: Scott Mair
May 8; 7:30 p.m. EST; Game 8	LP: Kenna Raye Dark (18–8)	Boxscore	WP: Emma Lemley (17–6)	Boston College Softball Field; Attendance: 533; Umpires: HP: Alex Leap, 1B: Rick Cowan, 2B: Roger Potts, 3B: Scott Mair

===== Semifinals =====
May 9; 10:00 a.m. EST; Game 10	(4) Duke	2–3	(1) Florida State	Boston College Softball Field; Attendance: 653; Umpires: HP: Don Brown, 1B: Craig Hyde, 2B: Tatum Stoelting, 3B: Roger Potts
May 9; 10:00 a.m. EST; Game 10	LP: Dani Drogenmuller (17–8)	Boxscore	WP: Jazzy Francik (10–2); Sv: Ashtyn Danley (4)	Boston College Softball Field; Attendance: 653; Umpires: HP: Don Brown, 1B: Craig Hyde, 2B: Tatum Stoelting, 3B: Roger Potts
May 9; 10:00 a.m. EST; Game 10		Boxscore	HR: Edenfield (9)	Boston College Softball Field; Attendance: 653; Umpires: HP: Don Brown, 1B: Craig Hyde, 2B: Tatum Stoelting, 3B: Roger Potts

May 9; 12:30 p.m. EST; Game 10	(3) Virginia Tech	9–10	(2) Clemson	Boston College Softball Field; Attendance: 612; Umpires: HP: Scott Mair, 1B: Jim Cooper, 2B: Alex Leap, 3B: Rick Cowan
May 9; 12:30 p.m. EST; Game 10	LP: Emma Lemley (17–7)	Boxscore	WP: Brooke McCubbin (15–5)	Boston College Softball Field; Attendance: 612; Umpires: HP: Scott Mair, 1B: Jim Cooper, 2B: Alex Leap, 3B: Rick Cowan
May 9; 12:30 p.m. EST; Game 10	HR: McMillan (30)	Boxscore		Boston College Softball Field; Attendance: 612; Umpires: HP: Scott Mair, 1B: Jim Cooper, 2B: Alex Leap, 3B: Rick Cowan

==== Championship game ====
2025 ACC tournament championship
No. 2 Clemson	2–1	No. 1 Florida State

May 10, 2025 – 2:30 p.m. (EDT) at Boston College Softball Field in Chestnut Hill, Massachusetts
Team	1	2	3	4	5	6	7	R	H	E
No. 2 Clemson	0	0	0	0	0	0	2	2	3	2
No. 1 Florida State	0	0	1	0	0	0	0	1	8	0
WP: Brooke McCubbin (16–5) LP: Jazzy Francik (10–3); Home runs: CU: Kylee Johnson (5); FSU: Hallie Wacaser (7); Attendance: 1,200; Boxscore

== All Tournament Team ==
Position	Player	Team
P	Kenna Raye Dark	North Carolina
P	Dani Drogemuller	Duke
P	Jazzy Francik	Florida State
P	Brooke McCubbin	Clemson
C	Michaela Edenfield	Florida State
C	Abby Vieira	Clemson
INF	Maddie Moore	Clemson
INF	**Taylor Pipkins**	Clemson
INF	Isa Torres	Florida State
OF	Jahni Kerr	Florida State
OF	Cori McMillan	Virginia Tech

MVP in bold
