= 2025 Florida State Seminoles softball team =

American college softball season

2025 Florida State Seminoles softball

ACC Regular Season Champion ACC Tournament Runner-up

NCAA Tournament, Super Regional
- Conference: Atlantic Coast Conference

Ranking
- Coaches: No. 10
- CB: No. 12
- Record: 49–12 (18–3 ACC)
- Head coach: Lonni Alameda (17th season)
- Home stadium: JoAnne Graf Field

2025 Atlantic Coast Conference softball standings
	Conf.						Overall
Team	W		L		T	PCT	W		L		T	PCT
No. 5 Florida State ‍†‍‍^{y}	18	–	3	–	0	.857	49	–	12	–	0	.803
No. 13 Clemson ‍‍‡‍^{y}	19	–	5	–	0	.792	48	–	14	–	0	.774
No. 15 Virginia Tech ‍‍‍^{y}	18	–	6	–	0	.750	43	–	13	–	0	.768
No. 16 Stanford ‍‍‍^{y}	16	–	8	–	0	.667	42	–	11	–	0	.792
No. 21 Duke ‍‍‍^{y}	16	–	8	–	0	.667	41	–	18	–	0	.695
North Carolina ‍‍‍^{y}	15	–	9	–	0	.625	40	–	17	–	0	.702
No. 25 Virginia ‍‍‍^{y}	14	–	10	–	0	.583	38	–	19	–	0	.667
Georgia Tech ‍‍‍^{y}	10	–	11	–	0	.476	27	–	24	–	0	.529
California ‍‍‍^{y}	11	–	13	–	0	.458	37	–	21	–	0	.638
Louisville ‍‍‍	9	–	15	–	0	.375	26	–	25	–	0	.510
Notre Dame ‍‍‍	7	–	17	–	0	.292	23	–	31	–	1	.427
Pittsburgh ‍‍‍	7	–	17	–	0	.292	20	–	32	–	0	.385
Syracuse ‍‍‍	6	–	18	–	0	.250	27	–	22	–	0	.551
NC State ‍‍‍	6	–	18	–	0	.250	25	–	29	–	0	.463
Boston College ‍‍‍	5	–	19	–	0	.208	22	–	29	–	0	.431
† – Conference champion ‡ – Tournament champion y – Invited to the NCAA Tournament; As of May 24, 2025; Rankings from NFCA/USA Today

The 2025 Florida State Seminoles softball team represented Florida State University in the 2025 NCAA Division I softball season. The Seminoles were coached by Lonni Alameda in her seventeenth season. They played their home games at JoAnne Graf Field and competed in the Atlantic Coast Conference (ACC).

== Roster and personnel ==
2025 Florida State Seminoles roster
Pitchers: 10 – Miami Gooden – Sophomore; 17 – Julia Apsel – (redshirt) Senior; 31 – Makenna Reid – Junior; 32 – Jazzy Francik – Freshman; Catchers: 24 – Madi Frey – Junior; 51 – Michaela Edennfield – (redshirt) Senior; Outfielders: 1 – Hallie Wacaser – (redshirt) Senior; 2 – Addie DeLong – Freshman; 4 – Jahni Kerr – (redshirt) Senior; 23 – Kennedy Harp – Sophomore	Infielders: 3 – Isa Torres – Sophomore; 7 – Angelee Bueno – Sophomore; 9 – Shelby McKenzie – Freshman; 12 – Amaya Ross – Senior; 22 – Annie Potter – (redshirt) Senior; 27 – Krystina Hertley – Senior; 42 – Jaysoni Beachum – Sophomore; Utility: 77 – Katie Dack – Senior; 44 – Isabella Ruggiero – Freshman; 66 – Annabelle Widra – Senior; 11 – Ashtyn Danley – Sophomore

2025 Florida State Seminoles coaching staff
- Lonni Alameda – Head coach (17th season)
- Travis Wilson – Assistant coach (14th season)
- Troy Cameron – Assistant coach (6th season)
- Kaleigh Rafter – Assistant coach (4th season)

== Schedule and results ==
2025 Florida State Seminoles game log (Overall: 49–12; Conference: 18–3); (Home: 21–6; Away: 15–4; Neutral: 13–2)
Regular season (44–8)
February (14–3)
(Home; 6–2; Away: 8–1)

Date Time	Opponent	Rank	TV	Venue	Score	Win	Loss	Save	Attendance	Overall record	ACC record

March (19–2)
(Home; 9–0; Away: 10–2)

Date Time	Opponent	Rank	TV	Venue	Score	Win	Loss	Save	Attendance	Overall record	ACC record

April (9–2)
(Home; 3–1; Away: 6–1)

Date Time	Opponent	Rank	TV	Venue	Score	Win	Loss	Save	Attendance	Overall record	ACC record

May (2–1)
(Home; 0–0; Away: 2–1)

Date Time	Opponent	Rank	TV	Venue	Score	Win	Loss	Save	Attendance	Overall record	ACC record

Postseason (5–4)
ACC Tournament (2–1)

Date Time	Opponent	Rank	TV	Venue	Score	Win	Loss	Save	Attendance	Overall record	Tournament record
May 8; 11:00 a.m.	vs (8) Georgia Tech; Quarterfinals	(1) No. 4	ACCN	Boston College Softball Field • Chestnut Hill, Massachusetts	8–0 (6)	**Danley** (12–1)	Norton (3–6)	—	350	45–8	1–0
May 9; 10:00 a.m.	vs (4) No. 17 Duke; Semifinals	(1) No. 4	ACCN	Boston College Softball Field • Chestnut Hill, Massachusetts	3–2	**Francik** (10–2)	Dani Brogenmuller (17–8)	**Danley** (4)	653	46–8	2–0
May 10; 2:30 p.m.	vs (2) No. 12 Clemson; Championship	(1) No. 4	ESPN	Boston College Softball Field • Chestnut Hill, Massachusetts	1–2	McCubbin (16–5)	**Francik** (10–3)	—	1,200	46–9	2–1

NCAA Tournament (3–3)

Date Time	Opponent	Rank	TV	Venue	Score	Win	Loss	Save	Attendance	Overall record	NCAAT record
May 16; 2:30 p.m.	Robert Morris (Regional)	(5) No. 4	ACCN	JoAnne Graf Field • Tallahassee, Florida	10–1 (5)	**Widra** (10–2)	Devault (14–8)	—	1,392	47–9	1–0
May 17; 1:00 p.m.	South Florida (Regional)	(5) No. 4	ESPN+	JoAnne Graf Field • Tallahassee, Florida	8–0 (6)	**Danley** (13–1)	Long (7–5)	—		48–9	2–0
May 18; 12:00 p.m.	Auburn (Regional Final)	(5) No. 4	ACCN	JoAnne Graf Field • Tallahassee, Florida	3–8	Geurin (23–11)	**Apsel** (12–1)	—	1,288	48–10	2–1
May 18; 3:00 p.m.	Auburn (Regional Final)	(5) No. 4	ESPN	JoAnne Graf Field • Tallahassee, Florida	4–0	**Danley** (14–1)	Geurin (23–12)	**Francik** (8)	1,288	49–10	3–1
May 22; 7:00 p.m.	(12) No. 9 Texas Tech (Super Regional - Game 1)	(5) No. 4	ESPN2	JoAnne Graf Field • Tallahassee, Florida	0–3	Canady (29–5)	**Danley** (14–2)	—	1,404	49–11	3–2
May 23; 3:00 p.m.	(12) No. 9 Texas Tech (Super Regional - Game 2)	(5) No. 4	ESPN2	JoAnne Graf Field • Tallahassee, Florida	1–2	Canady (30–5)	**Apsel** (12–2)	—	1,396	49–12	3–2

"#" represents ranking. All rankings from D1Softball Poll on the date of the contest.
"()" represents postseason seeding in the ACC Tournament or NCAA Regional, respectively.
= Win, = Loss, = Canceled/Postponed
Bold = **Florida State team member**
* = Non-Conference Game
Schedule Source:

== Rankings ==
Ranking movements Legend: ██ Increase in ranking ██ Decrease in ranking
	Week															
Poll	Pre	1	2	3	4	5	6	7	8	9	10	11	12	13	14	Final
NFCA / USA Today	9	8	8	9	8	10	9	7	8	9	7	6	7	6	5	10
Softball America	10	7	5	9	8	11	10	8	6	5	4	4	5	3	3*	10
ESPN.com/USA Softball	12	9	8	8	9	10	9	8	10	9	8	7	9	8	7	9
D1Softball	8	6	4	10	11	12	14	5	4	4	3	4	5	4	4*	12

== Honors ==
Player	Award	Ref.
Kennedy Harp	Second Team All-American; ACC Player of the Week; All-ACC Third Team	
Jaysoni Beachum	ACC Player of the Week	
Jahni Kerr	ACC Player of the Week; All-ACC First Team	
Jazzy Francik	ACC Pitcher of the Week; All-ACC First Team; All-American Freshman Team; NFCA National Freshman of the Year finalist	
Isa Torres	First Team All-American; All-ACC First Team; USA Softball National Player of the Year finalist	
Katie Dack	All-ACC Second Team	
Ashtyn Danley	All-ACC Second Team	
Michaela Edenfield	All-ACC Second Team	
Lonni Alameda	ACC Coach of the Year	
