= Amy Kvilhaug =

American softball coach

Biographical details
- Education: Providence

Playing career
- 1993–1996: Providence
- Position: Pitcher

Coaching career (HC unless noted)
- 1997: Florida Southern (asst.)
- 1998: Rutgers (asst.)
- 1999: Seton Hall (asst.)
- 2000–2002: Providence (asst.)
- 2003–2006: Radford
- 2007–2018: St. John's
- 2020–2025: Boston College

Head coaching record
- Overall: 526–600 (.467)

Accomplishments and honors

Championships
- 2× Big East Regular Season Champions (2015, 2017); Big East Tournament Champions (2015)

Awards
- 2× Big East Coaching Staff of the Year (2015, 2017)

Amy Kvilhaug is an American, former softball pitcher, and head coach. She most recently served as the coach at Boston College. Kvilhaug played college softball for the Providence Friars and was named the 1993 Rookie of the Year and was also an All-Big East Conference selection.

== Coaching career ==
=== St. John's ===
In July 2006, Kvilhaug was named the eighth head coach in St. John's program history. On September 5, 2018, Kvilhaug retired as head coach, after serving as coach for 12 years. She helped lead St. John's to seven Big East tournament appearances. In 2015, she led the team to its first regular-season title win as well as its first Big East Tournament victory, and the program's first NCAA tournament appearance in 35 years. She finished her career with a record of 281–333–10.

=== Boston College ===
On July 2, 2019, Kvilhaug was named the new head coach of the Boston College Eagles softball program. Kvilhaug retired from coaching on May 5, 2025.

== Statistics ==
=== Providence ===
YEAR	W	L	GP	GS	CG	SHO	SV	IP	H	R	ER	BB	SO	ERA	WHIP
1993	13	3	17	14	13	5	0	109.1	85	30	19	6	33	1.22	0.83
1994	24	9	37	29	26	9	0	215.2	180	52	31	22	66	1.01	0.94
1995	22	7	30	27	16	8	0	197.1	162	46	31	17	75	1.10	0.91
1996	13	10	31	22	19	5	1	178.1	138	54	39	18	94	1.53	0.87
TOTALS	72	29	115	92	74	27	1	700.2	565	182	120	63	268	1.20	0.89

== Head coaching record ==
=== College ===
Record table
Season	Team	Overall	Conference	Standing	Postseason
Radford Highlanders (Big South Conference) (2003–2006)
2003	Radford	17–36	6–4	2nd	
2004	Radford	31–32	6–6	T–3rd	
2005	Radford	39–25	8–4	2nd	
2006	Radford	40–22	9–3	2nd	
Radford:		127–115 (.525)	29–17 (.630)		
St. John's Red Storm (Big East Conference) (2007–2013)
2007	St. John's	18–36	7–15	T–9th	
2008	St. John's	20–35	5–17	12th	
2009	St. John's	24–26	11–13	7th	
2010	St. John's	18–33	6–16	13th	
2011	St. John's	20–30	6–12	9th	
2012	St. John's	23–34	10–12	6th	
2013	St. John's	17–35–1	7–15	12th	
St. John's Red Storm (Big East Conference) (2014–2018)
2014	St. John's	28–23	12–8	2nd	
2015	St. John's	28–19	16–2	1st	NCAA Regional
2016	St. John's	29–20	12–7	3rd	
2017	St. John's	32–16	18–5	1st	
2018	St. John's	24–26	12–6	3rd	
St. John's:		281–333–1 (.458)	122–128 (.488)		
Boston College Eagles (Atlantic Coast Conference) (2020–2025)
2020	Boston College	9–12	1–2	T–9th	Season canceled due to COVID-19
2021	Boston College	13–32	8–24	13th	
2022	Boston College	20–27	6–18	T–11th	
2023	Boston College	24–28	6–18	T–12th	
2024	Boston College	30–24	9–15	T–8th	
2025	Boston College	22–29	5–19	15th	
Boston College:		118–152 (.437)	35–96 (.267)		
Total:		526–600 (.467)			
National champion Postseason invitational champion Conference regular season champion Conference regular season and conference tournament champion Division regular season champion Division regular season and conference tournament champion Conference tournament champion
