= Eddie Pellagrini Diamond =

Baseball stadium in Boston, Massachusetts

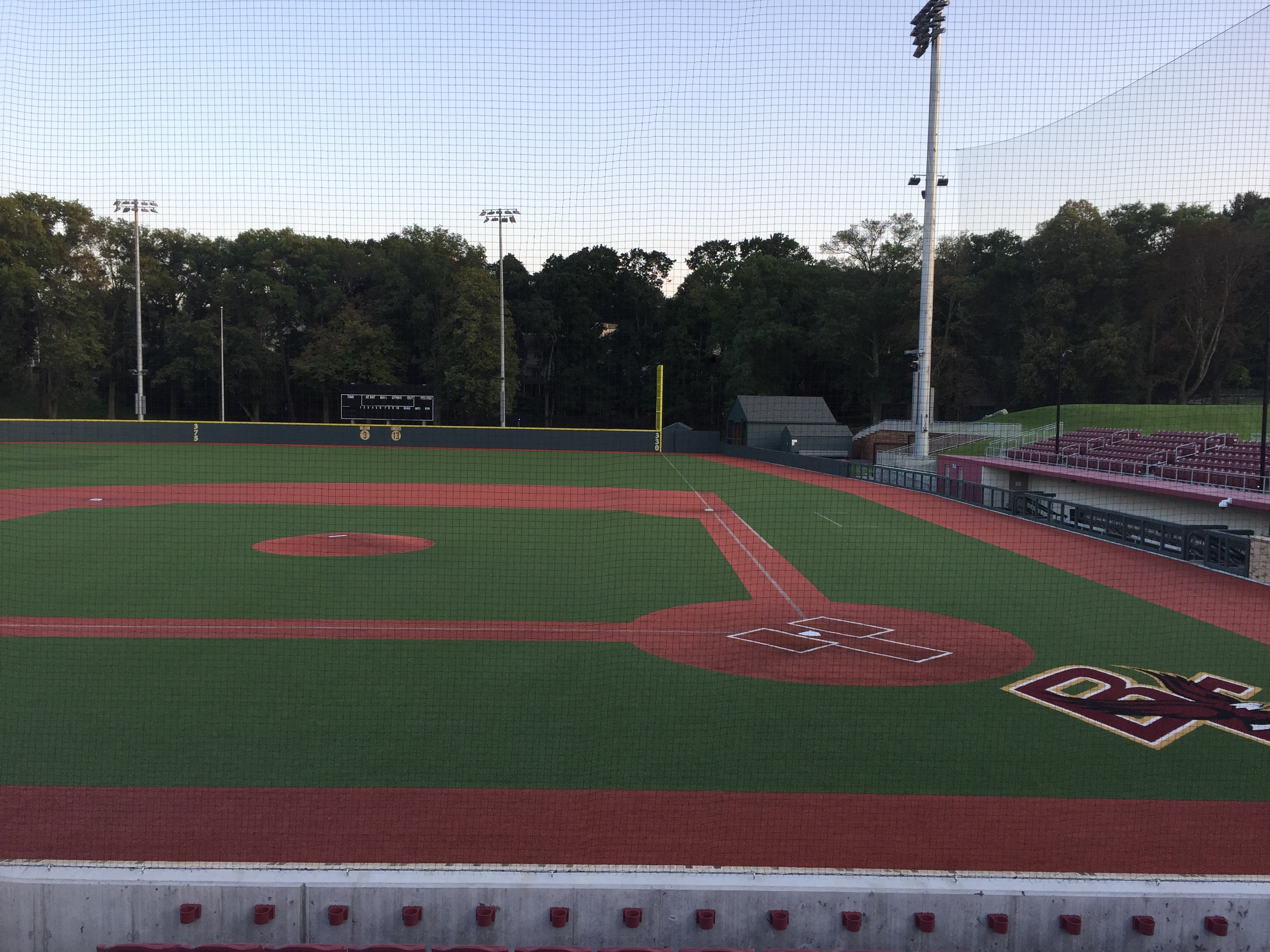
- Interactive map of Eddie Pellagrini Diamond
- Full name: Eddie Pellagrini Diamond at Harrington Athletics Village
- Former names: Brighton Baseball Field
- Address: 2125 Commonwealth Avenue; Boston, Massachusetts; United States
- Location: Harrington Athletics Village
- Coordinates: 42.343957°N 71.159761°W
- Owner: Boston College
- Capacity: 2,500
- Surface: AstroTurf Diamond Series

Construction
- Opened: March 20, 2018

Tenant
- Boston College Eagles baseball (2018–present)

Website
- bceagles.com

Eddie Pellagrini Diamond is a baseball stadium at the Harrington Athletics Village located in Boston College in Boston, Massachusetts, United States.

== History ==
Boston College constructed the new Eddie Pellagrini Diamond as part of an effort to improve the facilities of its athletic programs. The Board of Trustees deemed the previous Shea Field to be inadequate for the Atlantic Coast Conference standards and immediately launched plans for a new facility. The field was built on land which belonged to St. John's Seminary before being purchased by Boston College between 2004 and 2007.

The Brighton Baseball Field was slated to open on March 13, 2018, in Boston College's home opener against Holy Cross but was canceled due to a nor'easter. The stadium opened a week later on March 20, when the Eagles hosted cross-town opponents Northeastern in a non-conference matchup that Northeastern won 7–4 in 18 innings.

The complex that encompasses Eddie Pellagrini Diamond is dedicated to John L. Harrington, Boston College Trustee and former CEO of the Boston Red Sox.

== Facilities ==
Eddie Pellagrini Diamond utilizes AstroTurf Diamond Series for an artificial turf playing surface. The stadium has 1,000 fixed seat-back chairs but capacity can be expanded to 2,500 for championship events. The stadium has lights sufficient for night games.

== See also ==
- Boston College Eagles baseball
- Harrington Athletics Village
- List of NCAA Division I baseball venues
- List of U.S. baseball stadiums by capacity

Preceded by Eddie Pellagrini Diamond at John Shea Field	Home of Boston College Eagles baseball 2018–present	Incumbent
