= Boston College Eagles baseball =

Baseball team in Chestnut Hill, Massachusetts

- 2026 Boston College Eagles baseball team
- Founded: 1896
- University: Boston College
- Head coach: Todd Interdonato (3rd season)
- Conference: ACC; Atlantic Division
- Location: Chestnut Hill, Massachusetts
- Home stadium: Eddie Pellagrini Diamond (capacity: 2,500)
- Nickname: Eagles
- Colors: Maroon and gold

College World Series appearances
- 1953, 1960, 1961, 1967

NCAA regional champions
- 2016

NCAA tournament appearances
- 1949, 1953, 1955, 1960, 1961, 1967, 2009, 2016, 2023, 2026

The Boston College Eagles baseball team represents Boston College in NCAA Division I college baseball. The team participates in the Atlantic Division of the Atlantic Coast Conference. The head coach of the Eagles is Todd Interdonato, and the team plays its home games at the newly constructed Eddie Pellagrini Diamond at Harrington Athletics Village after having played at Shea Field from 1961 to 2017.

== NCAA Division I tournament ==
The team has been selected to play in the NCAA Division I baseball tournament ten times, most recently in 2026. It has played in the College World Series four times, the most recent being 1967.

Year	Record	Pct	Notes
1949	0–2	.000	Region A
1953	3–1	.750	College World Series (4th place)
1955	0–1	.000	District 1
1960	3–2	.600	College World Series (6th place)
1961	5–3	.625	College World Series (3rd place)
1967	5–4	.556	College World Series (6th place)
2009	1–2	.333	Austin Regional
2016	4–2	.667	Coral Gables Super Regional
2023	2–2	.500	Tuscaloosa Regional
2026	0–0	.000	Athens Regional

== Longest game in college-baseball history ==
On May 30, 2009, the Eagles played in the longest game in college baseball history—a 25-inning game—during the NCAA Division I Baseball Championship regional tournament at Austin, Texas. The University of Texas Longhorns—who were designated the visiting team despite playing on their home field—won, 3–2. The game lasted seven hours and three minutes.

== Exhibition game with Boston Red Sox ==
The team has traditionally played an exhibition game each spring against the Boston Red Sox, as part of the Red Sox' spring training (Grapefruit League) season at JetBlue Park at Fenway South.

== Annual ALS Awareness Game ==
This game began in 2012 and is played in honor of former captain Pete Frates (2004–2007), who was diagnosed with ALS in 2012. The game has been hosted at Fenway Park four times, most recently in 2024 when the Eagles upset #14 Virginia, 8–2.

== See also ==
- Boston College Eagles baseball coaches
- List of NCAA Division I baseball programs
