= Eddie Pellagrini Diamond at John Shea Field =

Baseball stadium in Chestnut Hill, Massachusetts

Coordinates: 42°20′03.4″N 71°09′47.2″W

Eddie Pellagrini Diamond at Shea Field
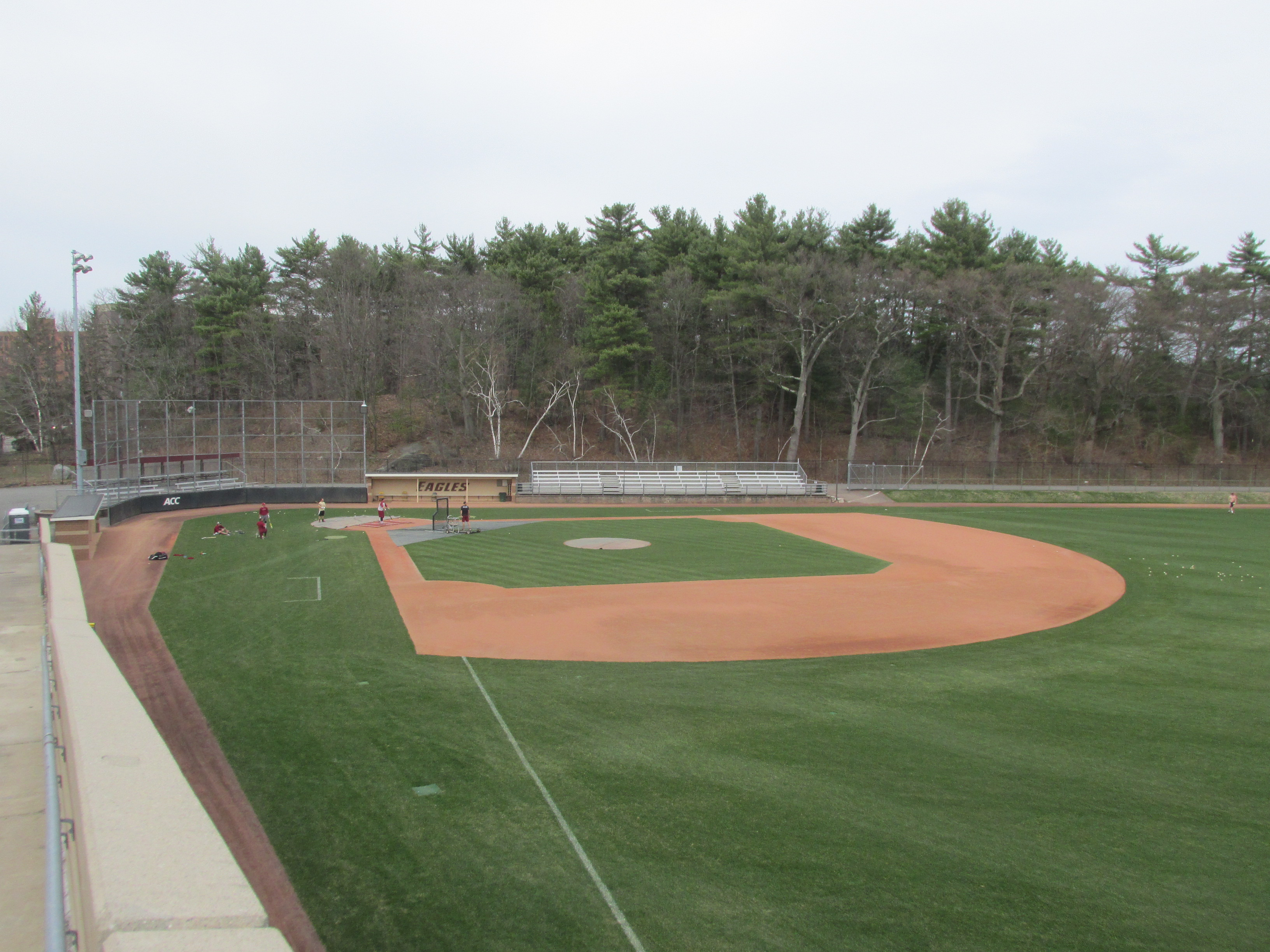
- Interactive map of Eddie Pellagrini Diamond at Shea Field
- Location: Chestnut Hill, Massachusetts, United States
- Owner: Boston College
- Capacity: 1,000
- Surface: Grass
- Field size: Left Field - 330 ft Center Field - 400 ft Right Field - 320 ft

Construction
- Opened: 1961
- Closed: May 20, 2017
- Demolished: June 2017

Tenant
- Boston College Eagles baseball (1961-2017)

Eddie Pellagrini Diamond at John Shea Field was a baseball stadium in Chestnut Hill, Massachusetts. It was the home field of the Boston College Eagles baseball team from 1961 to 2017. The stadium held 1,000 people and was named after Commander John Joseph Shea, USN, a former football player (1916–1917) at Boston College, who died on September 15, 1942, when the aircraft carrier USS Wasp was torpedoed and sunk during the Guadalcanal Campaign in World War II. In 1997, the diamond was named for Eddie Pellagrini, head coach of the Eagles for 31 years and the coach of the team when the field opened in 1961.

Shea Field was also home to many tailgaters during home football games at the adjacent Alumni Stadium.

The Boston College baseball team played its final game at Shea Field on May 20, 2017. The team moved to a new baseball facility, Eddie Pellagrini Diamond on nearby Brighton Campus, in the spring of 2018.

Boston College's new athletics field house, an indoor practice facility for football and other varsity and intramural sports, was constructed on the site of the former Shea Field. It was expected to open in August 2018.

== See also ==
- List of NCAA Division I baseball venues
