= John Rittman =

American softball coach (born 1963)

Current position
- Title: Head coach
- Team: Clemson
- Conference: ACC
- Record: 271-100

Biographical details
- Born: October 5, 1963 (age 63)

Playing career

Baseball
- 1982: Yavapai
- 1983–1985: New Mexico State
- Position: Outfielder

Coaching career (HC unless noted)

Softball
- 1988–1990: Oregon (asst.)
- 1991–1992: Minnesota (asst.)
- 1993–1996: Washington (asst.)
- 1997–2014: Stanford
- 2001–2008: United States (asst.)
- 2015, 2017: Kansas (assoc. HC)
- 2016–present: United States (asst.)
- 2020–present: Clemson

Head coaching record
- Overall: 1,021–451–3 (.693)
- Tournaments: NCAA: 47–39 (.547)

Accomplishments and honors

Championships
- As assistant coach: Pac-10 (1996); As head coach: Pac-10 (2005); ACC (2021)

Awards
- NCAA Pacific Region Coach of the Year (1998); 2× Pac-10 Coach of the Year (2001, 2004); ACC Coach of the Year (2021)

John Richard Rittman (born October 5, 1963) is an American college softball coach, serving as the inaugural head coach of the Clemson Tigers softball team. He previously served as head coach at Stanford and an assistant with USA Softball, Kansas, Washington, Minnesota, and Oregon.

== Education ==
An outfielder, Rittman played college baseball at Yavapai College before transferring to New Mexico State University and playing three seasons there from 1983 to 1985. As a junior in 1984, Rittman played 51 games and batted .338 with 50 hits, 27 RBI, and one homer. Rittman graduated from New Mexico State in 1986 with a bachelor's degree in journalism.

== Coaching career ==
=== Assistant coach (1988–1996) ===
Rittman was an assistant softball coach at Oregon from 1988 to 1990, Minnesota from 1991 to 1992, and Washington from 1993 to 1996, during which Oregon advanced to the 1989 Women's College World Series and Minnesota won the 1992 Big Ten Conference title. Joining the inaugural Washington coaching staff in 1993, Rittman helped Washington win the 1996 Pac-10 title and advance to the championship game of the 1996 Women's College World Series.

=== Stanford (1997–2014) ===
In July 1996, Rittman became head coach at Stanford, a program that became a varsity sport in the 1994 season. As head coach from 1997 to 2014, Rittman had a cumulative 750–351–3 record and one Pac-10 title in 2005, with 16 consecutive NCAA Division I Softball Championship appearances from 1998 to 2013, five Super Regionals, and two Women's College World Series berths in 2001 and 2004.

At Stanford, Rittman coached several players who went on to play for the U.S. national women's softball team or elsewhere professionally, including Jessica Allister, Ashley Hansen, Lauren Lappin, and Jessica Mendoza. Mendoza and another Stanford player under Rittman, Ramona Shelburne, later became broadcasters for ESPN. Allister played two seasons in National Pro Fastpitch before returning to Stanford as an assistant coach under Rittman from 2007 to 2009 and becoming head coach at Stanford from 2018.

Rittman resigned from Stanford on June 2, 2014 after the team finished 5–19 in Pac-12 Conference games that season. His resignation was surrounded by controversy and findings of a major NCAA rules violation.

=== Kansas and USA Softball (2015–2017) ===
He then spent two seasons at Kansas as associate head coach in 2015 and 2017, and also two stints as an assistant with USA Softball.

=== Clemson (2017–present) ===
On November 3, 2017, Rittman was named the inaugural head coach at Clemson. They played their first season in 2020, which was cancelled due to the COVID-19 pandemic.

== Head coaching record ==
Record table
| Season | Team | Overall | Conference | Standing | Postseason |
|---|---|---|---|---|---|
Stanford Cardinal (Pacific-10/Pac-12 Conference) (1997–2014)
| 1997 | Stanford | 31–27–1 | 10–18 | 5th | |
| 1998 | Stanford | 41–18 | 17–11 | 3rd | NCAA Regionals |
| 1999 | Stanford | 40–25 | 10–18 | T–6th | NCAA Regionals |
| 2000 | Stanford | 45–18 | 9–12 | 4th | NCAA Regionals |
| 2001 | Stanford | 54–16–1 | 11–10 | T–3rd | Women's College World Series |
| 2002 | Stanford | 44–20 | 7–14 | T–6th | NCAA Regionals |
| 2003 | Stanford | 41–26 | 7–14 | T–6th | NCAA Regionals |
| 2004 | Stanford | 49–19 | 13–8 | T–2nd | Women's College World Series |
| 2005 | Stanford | 43–16 | 13–8 | T–1st | NCAA Super Regionals |
| 2006 | Stanford | 42–18 | 10–11 | 6th | NCAA Super Regionals |
| 2007 | Stanford | 35–21–1 | 7–13–1 | 6th | NCAA Regionals |
| 2008 | Stanford | 49–15 | 11–10 | 4th | NCAA Super Regionals |
| 2009 | Stanford | 48–11 | 13–8 | 4th | NCAA Super Regionals |
| 2010 | Stanford | 37–19 | 8–13 | T–6th | NCAA Regionals |
| 2011 | Stanford | 42–17 | 10–11 | 5th | NCAA Super Regionals |
| 2012 | Stanford | 40–19 | 11–13 | 6th | NCAA Regionals |
| 2013 | Stanford | 39–21 | 13–11 | 4th | NCAA Regionals |
| 2014 | Stanford | 30–25 | 5–19 | 8th | |
| Stanford: | | 750–351–3 (.681) | 185–222–1 (.455) | | |
Clemson Tigers (Atlantic Coast Conference) (2020–Present)
| 2020 | Clemson | 19–8 | 5–1 | 3rd | Season canceled due to the COVID-19 pandemic |
| 2021 | Clemson | 44–8 | 29–5 | 1st | NCAA Regionals |
| 2022 | Clemson | 42–17 | 14–10 | 5th | NCAA Super Regionals |
| 2023 | Clemson | 49–12 | 18–6 | 3rd | NCAA Super Regionals |
| 2024 | Clemson | 35–19 | 15–9 | T–4th | NCAA Regionals |
| 2025 | Clemson | 48–14 | 19–5 | 2nd | NCAA Super Regionals |
| 2026 | Clemson | 34–22 | 13–11 | 7th | NCAA Regional |
| Clemson: | | 271–100 (.730) | 113–47 (.706) | | |
| Total: | | 1,021–451–3 (.693) | | | |
National champion Postseason invitational champion Conference regular season champion Conference regular season and conference tournament champion Division regular season champion Division regular season and conference tournament champion Conference tournament champion
