= Harrington Athletics Village =

Sports complex at Boston College

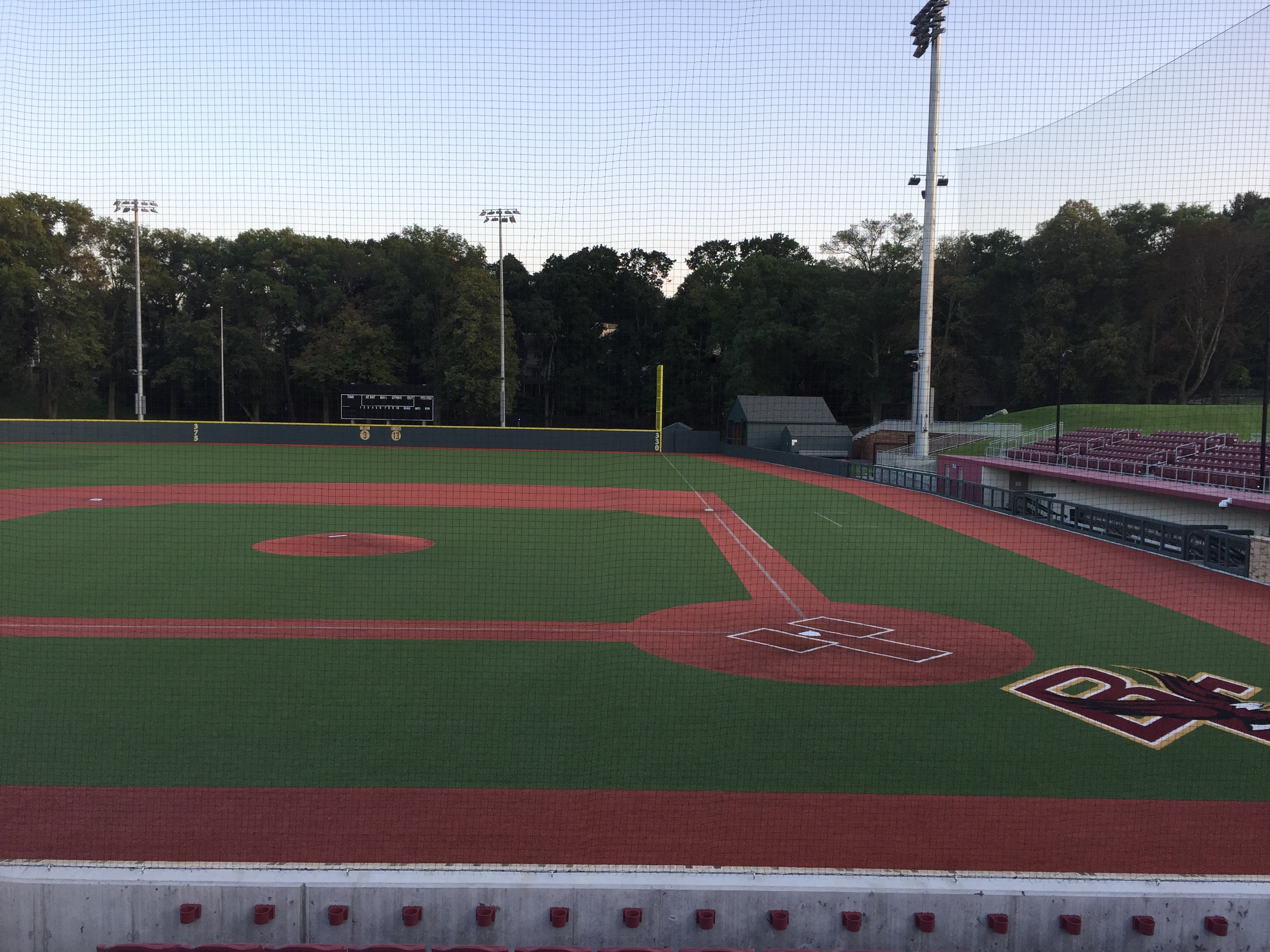
- Eddie Pellagrini Diamond
- Interactive map of Harrington Athletics Village
- Full name: Harrington Athletics Village at Brighton Fields
- Former names: Brighton Fields
- Address: 2125 Commonwealth Avenue; Boston, Massachusetts; United States
- Coordinates: 42.343957°N 71.159761°W
- Owner: Boston College
- Main venue: Eddie Pellagrini Diamond; Capacity: 2,500
- Facilities: Boston College Softball Field
- Public transit: Green Line at Boston College station

Construction
- Opened: March 20, 2018; 8 years ago

Tenant
- Boston College Eagles baseball (2018–present)

Website
- bceagles.com

The Harrington Athletics Village is a sports complex located on the Brighton Campus at Boston College in Boston, Massachusetts, United States.

The complex currently consists of the Eddie Pellagrini Diamond, which is home to the Boston College Eagles baseball team; the Boston College Softball Field, which is home to the softball team; and the Pete Frates Center, which is an indoor practice facility and hospitality area for the baseball and softball teams.

== History ==
Boston College acquired the lands of the Brighton Campus from the Archdiocese of Boston between 2004 and 2007. In the spring of 2004, Boston College began setting the institution's goals for the coming years. Included in the plans were the recently acquired Brighton lands, which called for a 1,500-seat baseball stadium, a 500-seat softball stadium, two intramural fields, and a 100,000 square feet (9,300 m^{2}) field house. Future modifications reduced the plans of the fields. The baseball and softball stadium capacities were reduced to 1,000 and 300 seats respectively, while additional changes eliminated the second intramural field and shrunk the field house to 60,000 square feet (5,600 m^{2}) before ultimately removing it from this project.

In 2016, the board of trustees at Boston College proposed the redevelopment of the Brighton Campus. The baseball and softball teams previously used Shea Field, which they shared with the football team. The Board of Trustees were motivated to provide the two programs with facilities that exceeded the Atlantic Coast Conference standards since Shea Field was inadequate. The complex development was a part of the ongoing Greater Heights campaign, which are efforts to improve Boston College's athletic programs.

The Brighton Baseball Field was slated to open on March 13, 2018, in Boston College's home opener against Holy Cross but was canceled due to a nor'easter. The stadium opened a week later on March 20, when the Eagles hosted cross-town opponents Northeastern in a non-conference matchup that Northeastern won 7–4 in 18 innings. The softball field opened on April 10, when the Eagles hosted the UMass Minutewomen.

On April 14, 2018, Brighton Fields were dedicated to University Trustee and former CEO of the Boston Red Sox John L. Harrington and renamed Harrington Athletics Village at Brighton Fields.

The Pete Frates Center opened in late 2020 as part of the Phase II of the project.

== Venues ==
=== Eddie Pellagrini Diamond ===
Eddie Pellagrini Diamond is the home stadium for Boston College Eagles baseball. The stadium replaces their previous home at Shea Field. The stadium features an artificial turf surface and has a fixed capacity of 1,000 seats, but is expandable to 2,500 for championship events.

=== Boston College Softball Field ===
The Boston College Softball Field is the home stadium for Boston College Eagles softball. The stadium has an artificial turf surface with a clay infield. There is seating for 300 spectators and can be expanded to 1,000 for championship events.

=== Pete Frates Center ===
The Pete Frates Center is a 31,000 square feet (2,900 m^{2}) indoor practice facility exclusive to the baseball and softball teams. The support building also includes locker rooms for each team. Outside, there is a terrace for fans overlooking the baseball stadium. The Frates Center includes batting cages and pitching mounds for year-round use, a state-of-the-art improvement over the program's previous conditions. Just three years prior, players had to shovel out the snowed-in batting cage in the tunnel to the Beacon Street Garage during the winter months.
