= Charlotte 49ers softball =

American softball team

- Founded: 1986
- University: University of North Carolina at Charlotte
- Head coach: Courtney Breault (1st season)
- Conference: The American
- Location: Charlotte, North Carolina, US
- Home stadium: Sue M. Daughtridge Stadium (capacity: 200)
- Nickname: 49ers
- Colors: Green and white

NCAA Tournament appearances
- 2023, 2024

Conference tournament championships
- AAC: 2024

Regular-season conference championships
- Atlantic 10: 2006 CUSA: 2023 AAC: 2024

The Charlotte 49ers softball team represents University of North Carolina at Charlotte in NCAA Division I college softball. As of the 2024 season, the team participates in the American Conference. The 49ers are currently led by head coach Courtney Breault. The team plays its home games at Sue M. Daughtridge Stadium located on the university's campus.
