= McWhorter Stadium =

Softball stadium in South Carolina, United States

- Interactive map of McWhorter Stadium
- Former names: Clemson Softball Stadium (2020)
- Location: N. Silas Pearman Blvd. (Perimeter Rd.); Clemson, South Carolina
- Coordinates: 34.677568°N 82.849033°W
- Owner: Clemson University
- Operator: Clemson University
- Capacity: 1,000
- Surface: Natural grass

Construction
- Opened: 2020; 6 years ago
- Cost: $13 million

Tenant
- Clemson Tigers (2020-present)

McWhorter Stadium is a softball park in the southeastern United States, located in Clemson, South Carolina. It is primarily used for NCAA and is the home field of the Clemson Tigers of the Division I Atlantic Coast Conference. The stadium opened in 2020, with the launch of the Tiger softball program, and contains seating for 1,000, additional spectator space on a grass berm, and player development areas.

On February 5, 2021, Clemson University announced that Stuart McWhorter and his family had donated $2.5 million to the softball program, and that the stadium would therefore be named in their honor.
