= Boston College Eagles softball =

College softball team

Boston College Eagles
- University: Boston College
- Head coach: Beth Krysiak (1st season)
- Conference: ACC; Atlantic Division
- Location: Chestnut Hill, Massachusetts, US
- Home stadium: Boston College Softball Field (capacity: 1,000)
- Nickname: Eagles
- Colors: Maroon and gold

NCAA Tournament appearances
- 1997, 1998, 2003

Conference tournament championships
- Big East; 1997, 1998 ACC

Boston College Eagles Softball currently plays in the Atlantic Coast Conference and is a Division I program. Their mascot is an American eagle.

== Coaching History ==
Years	Coach	Record	%
2020–2025	Amy Kvilhaug	118–152	.437
2026–present	Beth Krysiak	0–0	–

== Boston College in the NCAA Tournament ==
Year	Record	Pct	Notes
1997	1–2	.333	Regional No. 8
1998	0–2	.000	Regional No. 5
2003	2–2	.500	Regional No. 1
TOTALS	3–6	.333	

== Coaching staff ==
Name	Position coached	Consecutive season at Boston College in current position
Beth Krysiak	Head coach	1st
Garrett Nickel	Assistant coach	1st
Matt Burke	Assistant coach	1st
Tori Constantin	Assistant coach	2nd

== See Also ==
- List of NCAA Division I softball programs
