= Weaver =

Weaver or Weavers may refer to:

== Activities ==
- A person who engages in weaving fabric

== Animals ==
- Various birds of the family Ploceidae
- Crevice weaver spider family
- Orb-weaver spider family
- Weever (or weever-fish)

== Arts and entertainment ==
- Weaver (Stephen Baxter), the fourth novel in Baxter's Time's Tapestry series
- The Weavers, a folk music group formed in 1947 by Ronnie Gilbert, Lee Hays, Fred Hellerman and Pete Seeger
- The Weavers (1905 film), a silent, black and white documentary film made in 1905 by the Balkan film pioneers the Manaki brothers
- The Weavers (play), English title of Die Weber, a play by Gerhart Hauptmann
- Weaver, Nevada, an abandoned ghost town in the 2002 film Disappearance
- Corporal Weaver, a character in the 1998 DreamWorks Animation animated film Antz
- Weaver, the codename for Taylor Hebert in the web serial Worm
- Weaver Marquez, a character in the narrative videogame Kentucky Route Zero
- Grigori Weaver, a character in the 2010 video game Call of Duty: Black Ops and the 2020 sequel Call of Duty: Black Ops Cold War
- The Weavers, a race of intelligent spiders in Hollow Knight and Hollow Knight: Silksong

== Places ==
- Weaver, Alabama, US
- Weaver, Arizona, US
- Weaver, Indiana, US
- Weaver, Kansas, an unincorporated community
- Weaver, Minnesota, US
- Weavers, Ohio, an unincorporated community
- Weaver, West Virginia, US
- Weavers' Way, a long footpath, or trail, in Norfolk, England
- River Weaver in England
- Weaver Hills in Staffordshire, England
- Weaver Lake (disambiguation)
- Weaver's Mill Covered Bridge in Pennsylvania, US
- Weavers, New South Wales, Australia
- Weaver building, Swansea
- Weaver Siding, New Brunswick
- Weaver Settlement, Nova Scotia

== Organizations ==
- Weaver (company), a Chinese-based technology corporation specialised in Office Automation (OA) software

== Other uses ==
- Weaver (surname)
- Weavers (surname)
- Weaver line, a railway line in London
- Weaver Network, a planned public transport network in West Yorkshire
- Weaver rail mount, a style of mount used to attach a scope to a firearm or crossbow
- Weaver stance, a two-handed stance for use when firing handguns
- Dokumacılar (English: Weavers), a terrorist organisation part of the Islamic State of Iraq and the Levant active in Turkey

== See also ==
- Justice Weaver (disambiguation)
- The Weavers (disambiguation)
- Weever (disambiguation)
