= Weaver (surname) =

Weaver is a surname.

== Geographical Distribution ==
At the time of the United Kingdom Census of 1881, the frequency of the surname Weaver was highest in the following counties:

1. Herefordshire (1: 328)
2. Worcestershire (1: 531)
3. Shropshire (1: 677)
4. Montgomeryshire (1: 875)
5. Somerset (1: 881)
6. Staffordshire (1: 990)
7. Radnorshire (1: 1,053)
8. Gloucestershire (1: 1,055)
9. Cheshire (1: 2,111)
10. Denbighshire (1: 2,191)

As of 2014, the frequency of the surname was highest in the following countries and territories:

1. United States (1: 2,102)
2. Antigua and Barbuda (1: 2,105)
3. Wales (1: 3,813)
4. England (1: 4,658)
5. New Zealand (1: 4,731)
6. Cayman Islands (1: 5,041)
7. United States Virgin Islands (1: 5,911)
8. Saint Pierre and Miquelon (1: 6,081)
9. Australia (1: 6,952)
10. Canada (1: 8,207)

As of 2014, 85.5% of all known bearers of the surname Weaver were residents of the United States. The frequency of the surname was higher than national average in the following U.S. states:

1. Pennsylvania (1: 815)
2. Alabama (1: 1,017)
3. Georgia (1: 1,033)
4. Indiana (1: 1,157)
5. West Virginia (1: 1,163)
6. Ohio (1: 1,196)
7. Arkansas (1: 1,252)
8. Oklahoma (1: 1,328)
9. Tennessee (1: 1,343)
10. North Carolina (1: 1,449)
11. Virginia (1: 1,580)
12. Alaska (1: 1,605)
13. Idaho (1: 1,675)
14. South Carolina (1: 1,701)
15. Maryland (1: 1,834)
16. Montana (1: 1,842)
17. Mississippi (1: 1,854)
18. Kansas (1: 1,867)
19. Missouri (1: 1,880)
20. Oregon (1: 1,899)
21. Delaware (1: 1,918)
22. Utah (1: 1,949)
23. Colorado (1: 1,995)
24. Kentucky (1: 2,003)
25. Wyoming (1: 2,016)
26. Texas (1: 2,039)
27. Michigan (1: 2,062)
28. D.C. (1: 2,062)

As of 2014, the frequency of the surname was highest (over 10 times the national average) in the following U.S. counties:

1. Washington County, Ala. (1: 79)
2. Holmes County, Ohio (1: 101)
3. Petroleum County, Mont. (1: 101)
4. Granite County, Mont. (1: 121)
5. Gilmer County, Ga. (1: 126)
6. Clinton County, Pa. (1: 129)
7. Lancaster County, Pa. (1: 157)
8. Madison County, Va. (1: 159)
9. Ashe County, N.C. (1: 162)
10. Taylor County, W.Va. (1: 166)
11. Murray County, Ga. (1: 171)
12. Macon County, Ga. (1: 195)
13. Marion County, Ga. (1: 196)
14. Screven County, Ga. (1: 198)
15. Talbot County, Ga. (1: 202)
16. Edwards County, Texas (1: 209)
17. Mifflin County, Pa. (1: 210)

== People ==
Notable people with the surname include:

- Al Weaver (born 1981), British stage actor
- Amos Weaver (1869–1937), Philippine–American War Medal of Honor recipient
- Blayne Weaver (born 1976), US actor
- Brittanie Weaver, (born 1989), American fashion model
- Buck Weaver (1890–1956), US baseball player
- Claude Weaver (1867–1954), American politician
- Claude Weaver III (1923–1944), American-Canadian World War II flying ace
- Clement Weaver (1620–1683), member of House of Deputies, Colony of Rhode Island, 1678
- Curtis Weaver (born 1998), American football player
- Dennis Weaver (1924–2006), American actor
- Doodles Weaver (1911–1983), American comic and actor; brother of Pat, uncle of Sigourney
- Dorman Weaver (died 1971), American politician
- Earl Weaver (1930–2013), American baseball manager
- Edmund Weaver (astronomer) (1683–1748), astronomer
- Edmund Weaver (MP) (1610–1672), English politician
- Ellen Armstrong Weaver (1844–1924), Hawaiian clubwoman
- Evan Weaver (born 1998), American football player
- Fawn Weaver, author, entrepreneur, and historian
- George Weaver (disambiguation), multiple people
- Harold Francis Weaver (1917–2017), American astronomer
- Harriet Shaw Weaver (1876–1961), English political activist and magazine editor
- Henry A. Weaver (1820–1890), American politician from Pennsylvania
- Henry Grady Weaver (1889–1949), author of The Mainspring of Human Progress, General Motors executive
- Iva Bigelow Weaver (1875–1932), American singer
- J. J. Weaver (born 1999), American football player
- Jacki Weaver, Australian actress
- James Weaver (disambiguation), multiple people
- Jeff Weaver (born 1976), American baseball player
- Jered Weaver (born 1982), American baseball player
- Joe Weaver (1934–2006), American blues and R&B pianist, singer and bandleader
- John Weaver (disambiguation), multiple people
- Johnette Gordon-Weaver, American historian
- Kaitlyn Weaver (born 1989), American-Canadian ice dancer
- Larrye Weaver (born 1931), American football player and coach
- Lee Weaver (1930–2025), American actor
- Leonard Weaver, American football player
- Louise Weaver (born 1966), Australian artist
- Luke Weaver (born 1993), American baseball player
- Marjorie Weaver (1913–1994), American actress
- Michael Weaver (disambiguation), several people
- Mike Weaver (boxer) (born 1951), American boxer
- Mike Weaver (ice hockey) (born 1978), American ice hockey player
- Nicky Weaver (born 1979), English footballer
- Pat Weaver (1908–2002), American television executive, father of Sigourney, brother of Doodles
- Patty Weaver (born 1955), American actress
- Pauline Weaver (1797–1867), mountain man, trapper, prospector, scout for the Mormon Battalion and Civil War armies
- Rashad Weaver (born 1997), American football player
- Reece Weaver (born 2002), American cheerleader, actress and author
- Richard C. Weaver, better known as the "Handshake Man"
- Richard M. Weaver (1910–1963), American scholar and author
- Richard Weaver (MP) (1575–1642), English politician
- Robert C. Weaver (1907–1997), first US Secretary of Housing and Urban Development and first African-American to hold cabinet-level position
- Robert Weaver (MP) (1630–1687), English politician
- Sam Weaver (1909–1985), English footballer
- Sam Weaver (baseball) (1855–1914), American baseball player
- Sigourney Weaver (born 1949), American actress, daughter of Pat Weaver, niece of Doodles
- Stanley B. Weaver (1925–2003), American politician and funeral director
- Sylvester Laflin "Pat" Weaver Jr. (see Pat Weaver, above)
- Warren Weaver (1894–1978), mathematician and author of Weaver's memorandum for machine translation
- William Weaver (1923–2013), translator
- Will Weaver (basketball), American basketball coach

== See also ==
- Weaver W. Adams (1901–1963), American chess master, author, and opening theoretician
- Weaver Hawkins (1893–1977), English painter and printmaker
- Weaver Levy (1925–2018), Chinese American character actor
- Weavers (surname)
