= Norvall Neve =

American coach and administrator (1913–1985)

Biographical details
- Born: August 25, 1913; Bison, Kansas, U.S.
- Died: September 4, 1985 (aged 72); Greensboro, North Carolina, U.S.

Coaching career (HC unless noted)

Football
- 1935–1936: Ford HS (KS)
- 1937–1938: Kinsley HS (KS)
- 1939–1941: Wellington HS (KS)
- 1942–1946: Hutchinson HS (KS)
- 1947: Kansas State (backfield)
- 1948–1950: Wichita State (backfield)

Baseball
- 1951: Wichita State

Administrative career (AD unless noted)
- 1951–1955: Wichita State
- 1957–1969: Missouri Valley Conference (commissioner)
- 1970–1971: Atlantic Coast Conference (acting commissioner)

Head coaching record
- Overall: 97–13–1 (.878) (high school football); 2–3 (.400) (college baseball)

Accomplishments and honors

Championships
- 2x Arkansas Valley Conference champion

Neale Norvall Neve (August 25, 1913 – September 4, 1985) was an American coach and administrator who was director of athletics at Wichita State University from 1951 to 1955, commissioner of the Missouri Valley Conference from 1957 to 1969, and supervisor of football and basketball officials for the Atlantic Coast Conference from 1969 to 1983.

== Biography ==
Neve was born in Bison, Kansas and was a member of the football, basketball, and track teams at Fort Hays State College. He graduated in 1935 and coached high school football in Ford, Kinsley, Wellington, and Hutchinson, Kansas. He compiled an overall record of 97–13–1. His Hutchinson High School teams won two Arkansas Valley titles.

In 1947, Neve was named backfield coach at Kansas State. The following year, he took the same position at Wichita State University. He served as head coach of the Wichita State Shockers baseball team for part of the 1951 season, winning two games and losing three.

In 1951, head football coach and athletic director Jim Trimble resigned to become an assistant with the Philadelphia Eagles and Neve was appointed Wichita State's first full-time athletic director. He remained in this role until 1955, when he transferred to the university's finance department. He was WSU's director of auxiliary enterprises and purchasing until 1957, when he was named commissioner of the Missouri Valley Conference. During Neve's tenure, the MVC saw a high turnover in membership, having 23 teams join and 14 leave. The conference struggled because its schools had different leanings, with some favoring football and others favoring basketball. He resigned in 1969 to become supervisor of football and basketball officials for the Atlantic Coast Conference. He became the conference's acting commissioner in 1970 following the death of Jim Weaver. He remained in this role until Bob James took office the following year. Neve retired in 1983.

On September 4, 1985, Neve died at his home in Greensboro, North Carolina of an apparent heart attack.
