= Weevil (disambiguation) =

Weevils are beetles belonging to the superfamily Curculionoidea.

Weevil may also refer to:

- Weevil (band), a British indietronica duo 1999–2007
- Weevil (Torchwood), an alien race in Torchwood
- Insector Haga, Weevil Underwood, a character in the Yu-Gi-Oh! universe
- Eli "Weevil" Navarro, a supporting character in Veronica Mars

== See also ==
- Weeville, a 1990 album by New Zealand band Tall Dwarfs
- Weavel, a fictional character from Metroid Prime Hunters
- Weavile, a fictional creature from the Pokémon franchise
- Weedle, a fictional creature from the Pokémon franchise
- Weever (disambiguation)
- Boll weevil (disambiguation)
