= Justice Weaver =

Justice Weaver or Judge Weaver or variation, may refer to:

- Elizabeth Weaver (1941–2015), associate justice of the Michigan Supreme Court
- Frank P. Weaver (1904–1983), associate justice of the Washington Supreme Court
- Silas M. Weaver (1843–1923), associate justice of the Iowa Supreme Court

== See also ==
- Weaver (surname)
- Weaver (disambiguation)
