= Atlantic Coast Conference =

American collegiate athletics conference

- Association: NCAA
- Founded: May 8, 1953; 73 years ago
- Commissioner: James J. Phillips (since February 1, 2021)
- Sports fielded: 28; men's: 13; women's: 15
- Division: Division I
- Subdivision: FBS
- No. of teams: 18
- Headquarters: Charlotte, North Carolina
- Region: South; South Atlantic; East South Central; West South Central; Northeast; Mid-Atlantic; New England; Midwest; East North Central; West; Pacific
- Broadcasters: ABC/ESPN/ACC Network; The CW (via Raycom Sports)
- Streaming partner: ESPN
- Website: theacc.com

Locations

The Atlantic Coast Conference (ACC) is a collegiate athletic conference in the United States. Headquartered in Charlotte, North Carolina, the ACC's eighteen member universities compete in the National Collegiate Athletic Association (NCAA)'s Division I. ACC football teams compete in the NCAA Division I Football Bowl Subdivision. The ACC sponsors competition in twenty-eight sports with many of its member institutions held in high regard nationally. Current members of the conference are Boston College, California, Clemson, Duke, Florida State, Georgia Tech, Louisville, Miami, North Carolina, NC State, Notre Dame, Pittsburgh, SMU, Stanford, Syracuse, Virginia, Virginia Tech, and Wake Forest.

ACC teams and athletes have claimed dozens of national championships in multiple sports throughout the conference's history. Generally, the ACC's top athletes and teams in any particular sport in a given year are considered to be among the top collegiate competitors in the nation. Additionally, the conference enjoys extensive media coverage. With the advent of the College Football Playoff in 2014, the ACC is one of the "Power Four" conferences who had contractual tie-in to a New Year's Six bowl game in the sport of football prior to the playoffs being expanded in 2024.

The ACC was founded on May 8, 1953, by seven universities located in the South Atlantic states, with the University of Virginia joining in early December 1953 to bring the membership to eight. The loss of the University of South Carolina in 1971 dropped membership to seven, but the addition of Georgia Tech in 1979 for non-football sports and 1983 for football brought it back to eight, and Florida State's arrival in 1991 for non-football sports and 1992 for football increased the membership to nine. Since 2000, with the widespread reorganization of the NCAA, ten additional schools have joined, and one original member (Maryland) has left to bring it to the current membership of 18 schools. The additions in recent years extended the conference's footprint into the Northeast, Midwest, and West.

== Member universities ==
=== Full members ===
The ACC has 18 member institutions from 12 states. Listed in alphabetical order, these 12 states are California, Florida, Georgia, Indiana, Kentucky, Massachusetts, New York, North Carolina, Pennsylvania, South Carolina, Texas, and Virginia. The geographic domain of the conference is predominantly within the Southern and Northeastern United States along the US Atlantic coast, but recent conference realignment has brought it to California and Texas. The conference stretches from Florida in the south to New York in the north and from California in the west to Massachusetts farthest east.

When Notre Dame joined the ACC, it chose to remain a football independent. However, its football team established a special scheduling arrangement with the ACC to play a rotating selection of five ACC football teams per season. For the 2020 season, due largely to the suspension of most non-conference games by other Power Five conferences due to the COVID-19 pandemic in the United States, the ACC reached an agreement to allow Notre Dame to play a full, 10-game conference schedule and be eligible to play for the ACC championship.

The ACC is unique among power conferences in that it has a high proportion of private universities as members; eight of its 18 members are fully private institutions (not counting state-related Pittsburgh, a former private university). By contrast, the Big 12 has three private members, the Big Ten two, and the SEC one.

Since August 2, 2024, the 18 members of the ACC are:

Institution	Location	Founded	Type	Enrollment (fall 2023)	Median earnings	Endowment (billions – FY24)	Nickname	Joined (Note: Represents the calendar year when fall sports competition begins.)	Colors
Clemson University	Clemson, South Carolina	1889	Public (Land-grant)	28,747	$75,142	$1.124	Tigers	1953	
Duke University	Durham, North Carolina	1838	Nonsectarian (Note: Historically affiliated with the United Methodist Church.)	17,112	$115,722	$11.890	Blue Devils	1953	
University of North Carolina at Chapel Hill	Chapel Hill, North Carolina	1789	Public (Flagship)	32,234	$81,033	$5.728	Tar Heels	1953	
North Carolina State University	Raleigh, North Carolina	1887	Public (Land-grant)	37,323	$75,943	$2.220	Wolfpack	1953	
Wake Forest University	Winston-Salem, North Carolina	1834	Nonsectarian (Note: Historically affiliated with the Baptist State Convention of North Carolina.)	9,121	$92,943	$1.997	Demon Deacons	1953	
University of Virginia	Charlottesville, Virginia (Note: The entire UVA campus has a Charlottesville mailing address. It straddles the boundary between Charlottesville and Albemarle County, which encloses but does not include the city of Charlottesville.)	1819	Public (Flagship)	25,924	$91,448	$10.217	Cavaliers	1953	
Georgia Institute of Technology	Atlanta, Georgia	1885	Public	47,946	$119,180	$3.167	Yellow Jackets	1979 (Note: Although Georgia Tech joined the ACC for most sports during the 1979–80 school year, it did not compete for the league's football championship until the 1983 fall season (1983–84 school year).)	
Florida State University	Tallahassee, Florida	1851	Public (Flagship) (Note: The state of Florida prefers the term "preeminent university" and applies this designation to both University of Florida and Florida State University)	43,234	$66,924	$1.030	Seminoles	1991 (Note: Although Florida State joined the ACC for most sports during the 1991–92 school year, it did not compete for the league's football championship until the 1992 fall season (1992–93 school year).)	
University of Miami	Coral Gables, Florida	1925	Nonsectarian	19,593	$85,019	$1.590	Hurricanes	2004	
Virginia Polytechnic Institute and State University	Blacksburg, Virginia	1872	Public (Land-grant)	38,294	$85,647	$1.954	Hokies	2004	
Boston College	Chestnut Hill, Massachusetts (Note: Chestnut Hill, home to the main BC campus, exists as a village and postal office, but is not a municipal entity. The main campus is split between the cities of Boston and Newton. Athletic facilities are found not only on the main campus, but on a second campus entirely within Boston and a third entirely within Newton.)	1863	Catholic (Jesuit)	15,280	$96,145	$3.778	Eagles	2005	
University of Pittsburgh	Pittsburgh, Pennsylvania	1787	Public (State-related)	34,525	$73,701	$5.804	Panthers	2013	
Syracuse University	Syracuse, New York	1870	Nonsectarian	22,948	$79,406	$2.097	Orange	2013	
University of Notre Dame	Notre Dame, Indiana	1842	Catholic (Holy Cross)	13,174	$100,684	$17.897	Fighting Irish	2013	
University of Louisville	Louisville, Kentucky	1798	Public	22,139	$67,853	$1.008	Cardinals	2014	
Southern Methodist University	Dallas, Texas (Note: The SMU campus is almost entirely located in University Park, Texas, which, with the adjacent town of Highland Park, is completely surrounded by the city of Dallas. However, the U.S. Postal Service considers all locations in University Park to have a Dallas address.)	1911	Nonsectarian	11,842	$95,051	$2.122	Mustangs	2024	
University of California, Berkeley	Berkeley, California	1868	Public (Flagship, Land-grant) (Note: UC Berkeley's land-grant status is due to the designation of the entire University of California system as such. Most UC agricultural programs operate from the Davis and Riverside campuses.)	45,699	$96,018	$9.370	Golden Bears	2024	
Stanford University	Stanford, California	1891	Nonsectarian	18,446	$136,959	$37.631	Cardinal	2024	

=== Former members ===
In 1971, the University of South Carolina left the ACC to become an independent, later joining the Metro Conference in 1983 and moving to its current home, the Southeastern Conference, in 1991. On July 1, 2014, the University of Maryland departed for the Big Ten Conference.

Institution	Location	Founded	Type	Nickname	Joined (Note: Represents the calendar year when fall sports competition begins.)	Left (Note: Represents the calendar year when spring sports competition ends.)	Colors	Current conference
University of South Carolina	Columbia, South Carolina	1801	Public	Gamecocks	1953	1971		SEC
University of Maryland, College Park	College Park, Maryland	1856	Public (Land-grant)	Terrapins	1953	2014		Big Ten

=== Membership map ===
Atlantic Coast Conference (Atlantic Coast)
Atlantic Coast Conference Members
1 Clemson
2 Duke
3 North Carolina
4 NC State
5 Wake Forest
6 Virginia
7 Georgia Tech
8 Florida State
9 Miami
10 Virginia Tech
11 Boston College
12 Pittsburgh
13 Syracuse
14 Notre Dame (Non-football)
15 Louisville
16 SMU
Atlantic Coast Conference (Pacific Coast)
Atlantic Coast Conference Members
17 California
18 Stanford

=== Membership timeline ===
Full members Non-football members Independent Other Conference Other Conference

== History ==
=== Founding and early expansion ===
The ACC was established on June 14, 1953, when seven members of the Southern Conference left to form their own conference. (Note: It was the second major conference that evolved from the Southern Conference, following the departure of Alabama, Auburn, Florida, Georgia, Georgia Tech, Kentucky, LSU, Mississippi, Mississippi State, Sewanee, Tennessee, Tulane, and Vanderbilt to form the Southeastern Conference.) These seven universities became charter members of the ACC: Clemson, Duke, Maryland, North Carolina, North Carolina State, South Carolina, and Wake Forest. They left partially due to the Southern Conference's ban on post-season football play, initiated in 1951. (Clemson and Maryland had both defied the Southern Conference's bowl rule following the 1951 season and were banned from playing other conference teams in the 1952 season.) After drafting a set of bylaws for the creation of a new league, the seven withdrew from the Southern Conference at the spring meeting on the morning of May 8, 1953, at the Sedgefield Country Club in Greensboro, North Carolina. The bylaws were ratified on June 14, 1953, and the new conference was created. The conference officials indicated a desire to add an eighth member, and candidates mentioned were Virginia, VPI and West Virginia. On December 4, 1953, officials convened in Greensboro, North Carolina, and admitted Virginia, a former Southern Conference charter member that had been independent since 1937, into the conference. Virginia's president Colgate Darden argued fiercely against joining the ACC or any conference, while UVA athletics director Gus Tebell argued in favor. In the end, UVA's Board of Visitors approved joining the ACC by a vote of 6–3.

In 1960, the ACC implemented a minimum SAT score for incoming student-athletes of 750, the first conference to do so. This minimum was raised to 800 in 1964, but was ultimately struck down by a federal court in 1972.

On July 1, 1971, South Carolina left the ACC to become an independent.

==== Racial integration ====
Racial integration of all-white collegiate sports teams was high on the regional agenda in the 1950s and 1960s. Involved were issues of equality, racism, and the alumni demand for the top players needed to win high-profile games. The ACC took the lead. First they started to schedule integrated teams from the north. Finally ACC schools—typically under pressure from boosters and civil rights groups—integrated their teams. With an alumni base that dominated local and state politics, society and business, the ACC flagship schools were successful in their endeavor—as historian Pamela Grundy argues, they had learned how to win:

The widespread admiration that athletic ability inspired would help transform athletic fields from grounds of symbolic play to forces for social change, places where a wide range of citizens could publicly and at times effectively challenge the assumptions that cast them as unworthy of full participation in U.S. society. While athletic successes would not rid society of prejudice or stereotype—black athletes would continue to confront racial slurs...[—minority star players demonstrated] the discipline, intelligence, and poise to contend for position or influence in every arena of national life.

==== 1978 and 1991 expansions ====
The ACC operated with seven members until the addition of Georgia Tech from the Metro Conference, announced on April 3, 1978, and taking effect on July 1, 1979, except in football, in which Tech would remain an independent until joining ACC football in 1983. The total number of member schools reached nine with the addition of Florida State, also formerly from the Metro Conference, on July 1, 1991, in non-football sports and July 1, 1992, in football. The additions of those schools marked the first expansions of the conference footprint since 1953, though both schools were still located with the rest of the ACC schools in the South Atlantic States.

==== 2004–2005 expansion ====
The ACC added three members from the Big East Conference during the 2005 conference realignment. Initially, the conference targeted Boston College, Miami, and Syracuse. The expansion was controversial, as Connecticut, Rutgers, Pittsburgh, and West Virginia (and, initially, Virginia Tech) filed lawsuits against the ACC, Miami, and Boston College for allegedly conspiring to weaken the Big East Conference. Then-Virginia governor Mark Warner, who feared Virginia Tech being left behind in a weakened Big East, pressured the administration of the University of Virginia to lobby on behalf of their in-state foe. Eventually Virginia Tech replaced Syracuse in the expansion lineup and ACC expansion was agreed upon. Miami and Virginia Tech joined on July 1, 2004, while Boston College joined on July 1, 2005, as the league's twelfth member and the first from the Northeast.

=== 2010–present ===
==== 2010–2022 ====
The ACC Hall of Champions opened on March 2, 2011, next to the Greensboro Coliseum arena, making the ACC the second college sports conference to have a hall of fame after the Southern Conference. (Note: The Southern Conference Hall of Fame opened in 2009.)

On September 17, 2011, Big East Conference members Syracuse University and the University of Pittsburgh both applied to join the ACC. The two schools were accepted into the conference the following day, once again expanding the conference footprint like previous expansions. Because the Big East intended to hold Pitt and Syracuse to the 27-month notice period required by league bylaws, the most likely entry date into the ACC (barring negotiations) was July 1, 2014. However, in July 2012, the Big East came to an agreement with Syracuse and Pitt that allowed the two schools to leave the Big East on July 1, 2013.

On September 12, 2012, Notre Dame agreed to join the ACC in all conference sports except football and men's ice hockey (as the ACC does not sponsor men's ice hockey; of all other ACC universities, only Boston College sponsors men's ice hockey) as the conference's first member in the Midwestern United States. As part of the agreement, Notre Dame committed to play five football games each season against ACC schools beginning in 2014. On March 12, 2013, Notre Dame and the Big East announced they had reached a settlement allowing Notre Dame to join the ACC effective July 1, 2013.

On November 19, 2012, the University of Maryland's Board of Regents voted to withdraw from the ACC to join the Big Ten Conference effective in 2014. The following week, the Big East's University of Louisville accepted the ACC's invitation to become a full member, replacing Maryland effective July 1, 2014.

The ACC's presidents announced on April 22, 2013, that all 15 schools that would be members of the conference in 2014–15 had signed a grant of media rights (GOR), effective immediately and running through the 2026–27 school year, coinciding with the duration of the conference's then-current TV deal with ESPN. This move essentially prevents the ACC from being a target for other conferences seeking to expand—under the grant, if a school leaves the conference during the contract period, all revenue derived from that school's media rights for home games would belong to the ACC and not the school. The move also left the SEC as the only one of the FBS Power Five conferences without a GOR.

In July 2016, the GOR was extended through the 2035–36 school year, coinciding with the signing of a new 20-year deal with ESPN that would transform the then-current ad hoc ACC Network into a full-fledged network. The new network launched as a digital service in the 2016–17 school year and as a linear network in August 2019.

On August 24, 2021, the ACC formed an alliance with the Big Ten and Pac-12 conferences. In 2022, the ACC brought back old rivalries like the Backyard Brawl between the University of Pittsburgh Panthers and the West Virginia University Mountaineers. A friendly rivalry between University of Pittsburgh Panthers and Georgia Institute of Technology Yellow Jackets in memory of the 1956 Sugar Bowl and Bobby Grier, during the last game, actor Anthony Mackie appeared on field to honor Grier and the game.

==== 2024 expansion ====
On September 1, 2023, the conference voted to expand and add three new members: California, SMU, and Stanford. The board approved the expansion, which was initially controversial given the distance between the new schools and the then-current members, by a 12–3 vote. SMU joined on July 1, 2024, from the American Athletic Conference, while Cal and Stanford joined the ACC on August 2, 2024, due to the fiscal year of the Pac-12 Conference, their former conference, being different from most athletic conferences.

== Academics and ACC ==
=== Academic rankings ===
Among the major NCAA athletic conferences that sponsor NCAA Division I FBS football, including the current "power conferences", the ACC has been regarded as having the highest academically ranked collection of members based on U.S. News & World Report and by the NCAA's Academic Progress Rate.

Nine ACC institutions are members of the Association of American Universities: Cal, Duke, Georgia Tech, Miami, Notre Dame, Pittsburgh, North Carolina, Stanford, and Virginia. This roughly correlates with the division alignment when some ACC sports used "Atlantic" and "Coastal" divisions. Syracuse was a member until 2011 but voluntarily withdrew over a dispute on how to count non-federal grants.

Academics and Research
School	Endowment (in 2021 US$ billions)	AAU Member	US News US Ranking	Washington Monthly US Ranking	NTU US Ranking	CWTS Leiden US Impact Ranking	Scimago US Higher Education Ranking	URAP US Ranking	ARWU US Ranking	QS World Rankings	Major Faculty Awards(total awards)	Princeton Review Rating(scale 60–99)
Boston College	$3.83	No	36	50	138	157	174	145	118	631	6	85
California	$6.91	Yes	15	13	7	30	13	5	4	10		
Clemson	$1.01	No	75	177	138	108	140	123	145	851	3	78
Duke	$12.7	Yes	7	7	14	14	17	16	22	57	30	92
Florida State	$0.89	No	51	48	91	81	112	75	62	461	9	68
Georgia Tech	$2.97	Yes	32	56	47	47	37	45	52	97	21	86
Louisville	$0.96	No	158	251	119	104	135	110	172	1001	5	69
Miami	$1.39	Yes	64	243	59	57	68	54	83	278	7	78
North Carolina	$5.17	Yes	26	19	20	23	19	21	21	132	19	77
NC State	$1.95	No	64	75	72	42	57	56	62	274	11	75
Notre Dame	$13.3	Yes	20	10	101	101	105	87	100	304	14	80
Pittsburgh	$5.65	Yes	69	116	17	18	24	19	36	222	13	80
SMU	$2.0	No	88	320		190	211	160	158	1001		
Stanford	$37.8	Yes	4	2	3	4	3	2	2	5		
Syracuse	$1.81	No	75	45	138	147	171	129	158	781	11	77
Virginia	$14.5	Yes	26	37	53	51	53	46	62	260	15	87
Virginia Tech	$1.69	No	51	38	95	50	64	63	62	302	10	73
Wake Forest	$1.86	No	51	71	86	106	114	88	118	701	3	94

=== Student profile and outcomes ===
Undergraduate campus diversity (Fall 2024)
Campus	Asian	Black	Hispanic	International	Two or more races	Unknown	White	Low-income
Boston College	11%	5%	13%	6%	5%	2%	57%	15%
California	35%	2%	22%	10%	7%	4%	20%	30%
Clemson	3%	5%	9%	1%	4%	2%	76%	16%
Duke	22%	9%	11%	11%	7%	5%	35%	17%
Florida State	4%	7%	23%	2%	4%	1%	58%	25%
Georgia Tech	35%	8%	9%	8%	5%	1%	35%	17%
Louisville	6%	16%	9%	2%	6%	0%	61%	37%
Miami	5%	7%	24%	8%	5%	3%	49%	17%
North Carolina	16%	7%	10%	6%	5%	3%	53%	21%
NC State	10%	6%	9%	2%	5%	1%	66%	22%
Notre Dame	6%	5%	15%	7%	6%	2%	59%	15%
Pittsburgh	15%	5%	7%	4%	5%	2%	61%	19%
SMU	8%	5%	18%	4%	5%	3%	56%	15%
Stanford	29%	7%	17%	13%	10%	0%	23%	21%
Syracuse	7%	8%	12%	9%	4%	2%	57%	19%
Virginia	20%	8%	8%	5%	6%	5%	49%	18%
Virginia Tech	14%	6%	10%	5%	6%	3%	57%	16%
Wake Forest	5%	6%	10%	6%	5%	3%	65%	11%

Undergraduate student success outcomes (Fall 2024)
Campus	Retention rate (Note: The percentage of full-time students who return to this college after completing their freshman year.)	Graduation rate (Note: The percentage of students who graduate within 8 years of starting at this college.)	Net price (Note: The average yearly cost to attend this college for students from a family income of $0K to $30K, minus any grants and scholarships the student receives. For public colleges, this is the cost for in-state students. If the net price is negative, this college is paying money for the student to attend.)	Federal loan rate (Note: The percentage of undergraduate students who borrowed federal loans to help pay for college.)	Median debt (Note: The median federal loan debt of graduates of this college. This includes only federal loans taken out at this college, and excludes private student loans, Parent PLUS loans, and federal loans taken out at other colleges.)	Median earnings (Note: The median yearly incomes of former students who received federal aid 4 years after graduating from the college.)
Boston College	96%	91%	$7,293	30%	$19,000	$96,145
California	97%	94%	$5,110	17%	$12,416	$96,018
Clemson	93%	85%	$14,943	32%	$19,500	$75,142
Duke	97%	97%	$6,652	14%	$13,000	$115,722
Florida State	96%	83%	$4,332	20%	$13,000	$66,924
Georgia Tech	98%	93%	$7,687	18%	$19,500	$119,180
Louisville	81%	58%	$12,104	33%	$19,500	$67,853
Miami	93%	83%	$14,575	27%	$18,433	$85,019
North Carolina	97%	91%	$2,212	13%	$12,086	$81,033
NC State	94%	85%	$6,149	34%	$19,500	$75,943
Notre Dame	99%	97%	$8,380	24%	$19,000	$100,684
Pittsburgh	92%	83%	$16,477	45%	$23,000	$73,701
SMU	90%	82%	$31,728	22%	$18,750	$95,051
Stanford	98%	96%	$1,067	7%	$10,750	$136,959
Syracuse	91%	82%	$21,872	34%	$21,500	$79,406
Virginia	97%	95%	$9,479	20%	$15,000	$91,448
Virginia Tech	92%	87%	$11,378	34%	$20,500	$85,647
Wake Forest	94%	91%	$6,242	14%	$19,500	$92,943

=== ACCAC and ACC academic network ===
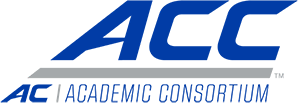

The members of the ACC participate in the Atlantic Coast Conference Academic Consortium (ACCAC), a consortium that provides a vehicle for inter-institutional academic and administrative collaboration between member universities. Growing out of a conference-wide doctoral student-exchange program that was established in 1999, the ACCAC has expanded its scope into other domestic and international collaborations.

The stated mission of the ACCAC is to "leverage the athletic associations and identities among the 15 ACC universities in order to enrich the educational missions of member universities." To that end, the collaborative helps organize various academic initiatives, including fellowship and scholarship programs, global research initiatives, leadership conferences, and extensive study abroad programs. Funding for its operations, 90% of which is spent on direct student support, is derived from a portion of the income generated by the ACC Football Championship Game and by supplemental allocations by individual universities and various grants.

=== ACCAC academic programs ===
Major academic programs that have been implemented under ACCAC include:

- The annual Meeting of the Minds (MOM) undergraduate research conference.
- The annual Student Leadership Conference.
- The Creativity and Innovation Fellowship Program in which each university receives $12,500 to award between two and five undergraduate students ACCAC fellowships for research or creative projects.
- The Summer Research Scholars Program in which every ACC university will receive $5,000 to support up to two of its undergraduate students in conducting research in residence at another ACC university during a minimum 10-week period over the summer.
- The ACC Debate Championship
- The ACC Inventure Prize Competition is a Shark Tank-like innovation competition for teams of students from ACC universities.
- The Student Federal Relations Trip to Washington, D.C. is an annual trip of student delegates from ACC universities to the nation's capital.
- The Creativity Competition is planned to be an ACC-wide, team-based interdisciplinary competition emphasizing use of creative design and the arts to begin in 2017.
- The Distinguished Lecturers Program in which five ACC universities select an outstanding faculty member as The ACCAC's Distinguished Lecturer. In addition to an award stipend, the ACCAC provides financial support to enable each ACC university to sponsor a "distinguished lecture event" on their campus.
- The Executive Leadership Series is a two-day skill enhancement programs designed for Deans, Vice Provosts, and Vice Chancellors of ACC universities.
- The annual Student President Conference.
- The Coach for College Program, primarily for student-athletes and run through Duke University with support from the ACCAC, that takes 32 ACC students to Vietnam for three weeks in the summer to coach hundreds of middle school children.
- The Traveling Scholars Program which allows PhD candidates from one ACC campus to access courses, laboratories, library, or other resources at any one of the other ACC member institution campuses.
- The Clean Energy Grant Competition that helps coordinate geographically defined clusters of ACC universities in competition for United States Department of Energy Clean Energy Grants.
- The Study Abroad Program collaborative which allows cross-registration in study abroad programs enroll in programs sponsored by an ACC university other than their "home" university. A Student Study Abroad Scholarship program that awarded two to five ACCAC scholarships for study abroad was discontinued in 2013, but is targeted for renewal in 2014–15.

The ACCAC also supports periodic meetings among faculty, administration, and staff who pursue similar interests and responsibilities at the member universities either by face-to-face conferences, video conferences, or telephone conferences. ACCAC affinity groups include those for International Affairs Officers, Study Abroad Directors, Teaching-Learning Center Directors, Chief Information Officers, Chief Procurement Officers, Undergraduate Research Conference Coordinators, Student Affairs Vice Presidents, Student Leadership Conference Coordinators, and Faculty Athletic Representatives To the ACC.

== Financials ==
=== Source of Conference Revenue ===
The following table shows the source of the revenue for the Atlantic Coast Conference during the fiscal year beginning 07-01-2024 ending 06-30-2025 as reported by ProPublica using Part VIII of the Atlantic Coast Conference tax filing submitted on May 14, 2026.

Source of Revenue	2024–25 Total Revenue	2024–25 Average Revenue Per Member
Contributions, Gifts, and Grants	$2,120,154	$117,786
Television Contracts	$588,840,156	$32,713,342
Post Season Bowls	$139,446,421	$7,747,023
NCAA	$68,705,698	$3,816,983
Conference Championships	$18,182,708	$1,010,150
Other Program Service	$1,442,998	$80,167
Other Revenue	$210,000	$11,667
Investment Income	$6,980,708	$387,817
Net Gain from Sale of Assets	$552,073	$30,671
Total	$826,480,916	$45,915,606

=== Conference distributions ===
The following table shows Atlantic Coast Conference distributions during the fiscal year July 1, 2024 - June 30, 2025 as reported by ProPublica using Schedule A of the Atlantic Coast Conference tax filings submitted on May 14, 2026.

Institution	2024–25 Distribution
Clemson University	$55,129,046
Syracuse University	$49,448,990
University of Miami	$48,250,645
Duke University	$48,236,296
University of North Carolina	$47,916,855
University of Louisville	$47,381,878
Boston College	$47,087,682
Virginia Tech	$46,546,737
North Carolina State University	$46,461,278
University of Pittsburgh	$46,304,685
Georgia Tech	$46,052,588
University of Virginia	$43,626,888
Florida State University	$43,601,179
Wake Forest University	$42,814,168
University of California Berkeley	$22,993,712
Stanford University	$19,557,463
University of Notre Dame	$18,142,243
SMU	$17,065,303
Average for 14 Full Share Schools Average for 4 Partial Share Schools	$47,061,351 19,439,680

=== CNBC list of the most valuable ACC schools ===
Rankings as of December 19, 2025 (2024–2025 academic year)

ACC	NCAA	School	Valuation	Value Change	Revenue	Revenue Change
1	6	Notre Dame Fighting Irish	$1.13 billion	▲17%	$235 million	▲5%
2	18	Clemson Tigers	$860 million	▲8%	$193 million	▼2%
3	23	Stanford Cardinal	$805 million	▲17%	$200 million	▲11%
4	28	Florida State Seminoles	$765 million	▲14%	$185 million	▲9%
5	29	Miami Hurricanes	$760 million	▲19%	$182 million	▲14%
6	33	Duke Blue Devils	$690 million	▲5%	$167 million	▲9%
7	36	North Carolina Tar Heels	$650 million	▲21%	$164 million	▲18%
8	37	Louisville Cardinals	$645 million	▲8%	$151 million	▲6%
9	40	Virginia Cavaliers	$610 million	▲20%	$154 million	▲9%
10	43	NC State Wolfpack	$584 million	▲21%	$133 million	▲10%
11	45	Georgia Tech Yellow Jackets	$577 million	▲16%	$142 million	▲6%
12	48	Pittsburgh Panthers	$572 million	▲9%	$139 million	▲1%
13	51	Virginia Tech Hokies	$564 million	▲19%	$139 million	▲7%
14	54	Boston College Eagles	$530 million	▲20%	$137 million	▲16%
15	59	Syracuse Orange	$452 million	▼7%	$112 million	▼2%
16	64	Wake Forest Demon Deacons	$405 million	▲12%	$103 million	▲6%
17	66	SMU Mustangs	$385 million	▲18%	$100 million	▲16%
18	72	California Golden Bears	$370 million	▼4%	$117 million	▼7%

=== Athletic department revenue by school ===
Total revenue includes ticket sales, contributions and donations, rights and licensing, student fees, school funds and all other sources including TV income, camp income, concessions, and novelties.

Total expenses includes coach and staff salaries, scholarships, buildings and grounds, maintenance, utilities and rental fees, recruiting, team travel, equipment and uniforms, conference dues, and insurance.

The following table shows institutional reporting to the United States Department of Education as shown on the DOE Equity in Athletics website for the 2024–25 academic year.

Institution	2024–25 Grand Total Revenues	2024–25 Grand Total Expenses	2024–25 Total Expenses on Football	2024–25 Total Expenses on Men's Basketball	2024–25 Total Expenses on Women's Basketball	2024–25 Total Expenses on All Other Sports	2024–25 Total Expenses Not Allocated by Sport
University of Notre Dame	$289,616,198	$244,698,449	$93,255,797	$13,245,301	$9,051,995	$52,066,237	$77,079,119
University of Miami	$230,484,608	$230,484,608	$88,117,956	$14,366,552	$7,926,455	$29,971,665	$90,101,980
Stanford University	$192,802,320	$192,802,320	$35,992,019	$10,765,368	$7,887,092	$63,179,789	$74,978,052
Florida State University	$192,717,172	$192,717,172	$83,267,924	$14,557,585	$5,736,021	$27,767,784	$61,387,858
Clemson University	$186,106,774	$186,106,774	$81,136,726	$12,592,738	$6,607,428	$45,341,160	$40,428,722
Duke University	$181,607,802	$180,590,186	$47,363,558	$31,868,603	$12,300,220	$49,232,274	$39,825,531
University of North Carolina	$180,835,031	$180,835,031	$49,145,749	$16,738,604	$6,779,610	$41,486,089	$66,684,979
University of California, Berkeley	$173,116,318	$173,116,318	$46,721,911	$14,101,936	$10,750,160	$42,759,482	$58,782,829
University of Louisville	$155,903,308	$154,819,604	$30,745,125	$14,854,067	$6,700,777	$27,766,790	$74,752,845
Virginia Polytechnic Institute and State University	$151,623,889	$148,984,818	$79,735,756	$8,485,407	$2,046,594	$6,043,509	$55,312,623
University of Pittsburgh	$151,337,808	$151,337,808	$47,141,722	$11,437,769	$5,131,830	$26,964,616	$60,661,871
University of Virginia	$150,622,194	$150,622,194	$33,611,796	$16,646,407	$5,796,602	$44,452,750	$50,114,639
Southern Methodist University	$150,225,313	$150,225,313	$45,315,587	$16,735,281	$7,327,986	$31,223,528	$49,622,931
Boston College	$142,122,049	$142,122,049	$47,531,226	$9,971,317	$2,035,289	$37,925,661	$44,658,556
Georgia Institute of Technology	$140,430,227	$140,430,227	$42,709,508	$12,013,953	$6,654,388	$17,659,685	$61,392,693
North Carolina State University	$135,830,733	$129,009,673	$40,535,367	$11,858,910	$6,202,637	$32,879,911	$37,532,848
Syracuse University	$120,839,134	$108,994,576	$42,090,055	$15,936,295	$5,994,083	$33,762,029	$11,212,114
Wake Forest University	$114,628,069	$114,628,069	$39,399,925	$13,055,099	$4,702,870	$27,974,721	$29,495,454

== Key personnel ==
Senior personnel of Atlantic Coast Conference athletic programs
School	Athletic director	Football coach	Men's basketball coach	Women's basketball coach	Baseball coach	Softball coach	Volleyball coach
Boston College	Blake James	Bill O'Brien	Luke Murray	Kate Popovec-Goss	Todd Interdonato	Beth Krysiak	Justin Kennedy
California	Jim Knowlton	Tosh Lupoi	Mark Madsen	Charmin Smith	Mike Neu	Vacant	Jen Malcom
Clemson	Graham Neff	Dabo Swinney	Brad Brownell	Shawn Poppie	Erik Bakich	John Rittman	Jackie Simpson Kirr
Duke	Nina King	Manny Diaz	Jon Scheyer	Kara Lawson	Cora Muscara	Marissa Young	Jolene Nagel
Florida State	Michael Alford	Mike Norvell	Luke Loucks	Brooke Wyckoff	Link Jarrett	Lonni Alameda	Chris Poole
Georgia Tech	Ryan Alpert	Brent Key	Scott Cross	Karen Blair	James Ramsey	Aileen Morales	Michelle Collier
Louisville	Josh Heird	Jeff Brohm	Pat Kelsey	Jeff Walz	Dan McDonnell	Holly Aprile	Dan Meske
Miami	Dan Radakovich	Mario Cristobal	Jai Lucas	Rhonda Revelle	J. D. Arteaga	No Team	Jose "Keno" Gandara
North Carolina	Bubba Cunningham	Bill Belichick	Michael Malone	Courtney Banghart	Scott Forbes	Megan Smith	Mike Schall
NC State	Boo Corrigan	Dave Doeren	Justin Gainey	Wes Moore	Elliott Avent	Lindsay Leftwich	Megan Wargo-Kearney
Notre Dame	Pete Bevacqua	Marcus Freeman (independent)	Micah Shrewsberry	Kelly Graves	Niele Ivey	Kris Ganeff	Salima Rockwell
Pittsburgh	Allen Greene	Pat Narduzzi	Jeff Capel	Robin Harmony	Mike Bell	Jenny Allard	Dan Fisher
SMU	Damon Evans	Rhett Lashlee	Andy Enfield	Adia Barnes	No Team	No Team	Sam Erger
Stanford	John Donahoe	Tavita Pritchard	Kyle Smith	Kate Paye	Dave Esquer	Jessica Allister	Kevin Hambly
Syracuse	John Wildhack	Fran Brown	Gerry McNamara	Felisha Legette-Jack	No Team	Shannon Doepking	Bakeer Ganesharatnam
Virginia	Carla Williams	Tony Elliott	Ryan Odom	Aaron Roussell	Chris Pollard	Joanna Hardin	Shannon Wells
Virginia Tech	Brian White	James Franklin	Mike Young	Megan Duffy	John Szefc	Pete D'Amour	Marcy Byers
Wake Forest	John Currie	Jake Dickert	Steve Forbes	Megan Gebbia	Tom Walter	No Team	Jeff Hulsmeyer

== Facilities ==
School	Football stadium	Capacity	Soccer stadium	Capacity	Basketball arena	Capacity	Baseball stadium	Capacity	Softball stadium	Capacity	Volleyball arena	Capacity
Boston College	Alumni Stadium	44,500	Newton Campus Soccer Field	1,100	Conte Forum	8,606	Eddie Pellagrini Diamond	2,500	Boston College Softball Field	1,000	Margot Connell Recreation Center	500
California	California Memorial Stadium	52,428	Edwards Stadium	22,000	Haas Pavilion	11,858	Evans Diamond	2,500	Levine-Fricke Field	1,204	Haas Pavilion	11,858
Clemson	Frank Howard Field at Memorial Stadium	82,500	Riggs Field	6,500	Littlejohn Coliseum	9,000	Doug Kingsmore Stadium	6,524	McWhorter Stadium	1,000	Jervey Gym	1,500
Duke	Wallace Wade Stadium	35,018	Koskinen Stadium	4,500	Cameron Indoor Stadium	9,314	Jack Coombs Field; Durham Bulls Athletic Park	2,000; 10,000	Duke Softball Stadium	1,300	Cameron Indoor Stadium	9,314
Florida State	Bobby Bowden Field at Doak Campbell Stadium	67,277	Seminole Soccer Complex	2,000	Donald L. Tucker Center	11,655	Mike Martin Field at Dick Howser Stadium	6,700	JoAnne Graf Field at the Seminole Softball Complex	1,000	Tully Gymnasium	1,162
Georgia Tech	Bobby Dodd Stadium at Hyundai Field	51,913	Non-soccer school		Hank McCamish Pavilion	8,600	Russ Chandler Stadium	3,718	Shirley Clements Mewborn Field	1,500	O'Keefe Gymnasium	1,500
Louisville	L&N Federal Credit Union Stadium	60,800	Dr. Mark & Cindy Lynn Stadium	5,300	KFC Yum! Center	22,090	Jim Patterson Stadium	4,000	Ulmer Stadium	2,200	L&N Federal Credit Union Arena	1,331
Miami	Hard Rock Stadium	65,326	Cobb Stadium	500	Watsco Center	7,972	Mark Light Field at Alex Rodriguez Park	5,000	Non-softball school		Freeman Indoor Stadium	1,000
North Carolina	Kenan Memorial Stadium	50,500	Dorrance Field	4,200	Dean Smith Center (M); Carmichael Arena (W)	21,750; 8,010	Boshamer Stadium	5,000	Anderson Stadium	500	Carmichael Arena	6,319
NC State	Carter-Finley Stadium	57,583	Dail Soccer Field	3,000	Lenovo Center (M); Reynolds Coliseum (W)	19,722; 5,500	Doak Field	3,000	Dail Softball Stadium	630	Reynolds Coliseum	5,500
Notre Dame	Notre Dame Stadium	77,569	Alumni Stadium	2,500	Edmund P. Joyce Center	9,149	Frank Eck Stadium	2,500	Melissa Cook Stadium	850	Edmund P. Joyce Center	9,149
Pittsburgh	Acrisure Stadium	65,500	Ambrose Urbanic Field at Petersen Sports Complex	735	Petersen Events Center	12,508	Charles L. Cost Field at Petersen Sports Complex	900	Vartabedian Field at Petersen Sports Complex	600	Fitzgerald Field House	4,122
SMU	Gerald J. Ford Stadium	32,000	Washburne Stadium	2,577	Moody Coliseum	7,000	Non-baseball school		Non-softball school		Moody Coliseum	7,000
Stanford	Stanford Stadium	50,424	Maloney Field at Laird Q. Cagan Stadium	2,000	Maples Pavilion	7,233	Klein Field at Sunken Diamond	4,000	Smith Family Stadium (Note: Due to renovations, Stanford is playing its home games in the 2025 softball season at Stanford Stadium.)	1,500	Maples Pavilion	7,233
Syracuse	JMA Wireless Dome	42,784	SU Soccer Stadium	1,500	JMA Wireless Dome	35,446	Non-baseball school		Softball Stadium at Skytop	650	Women's Building Gym A	3,000
Virginia	The Carl Smith Center, home of David A. Harrison III Field at Scott Stadium	61,500	Klöckner Stadium	8,000	John Paul Jones Arena	14,593	Davenport Field at Disharoon Park	5,500	Palmer Park	522	Memorial Gymnasium (Virginia)	2,500
Virginia Tech	Lane Stadium	65,632	Sandra D. Thompson Field	2,500	Cassell Coliseum	9,847	English Field	1,032	Tech Softball Park	1,024	Cassell Coliseum	9,847
Wake Forest	Allegacy Federal Credit Union Stadium	31,500	W. Dennie Spry Soccer Stadium	3,000	Lawrence Joel Veterans Memorial Coliseum	14,407	David F. Couch Ballpark	3,823	Non-softball school		Reynolds Gymnasium	934

== Sports ==
The Atlantic Coast Conference sponsors championship competition in thirteen men's and fifteen women's NCAA-sanctioned sports. The most recently added sports are women's gymnastics and fencing. Gymnastics was added for the 2023–24 school year with Clemson, North Carolina, North Carolina State, and Pitt participating; 2024 arrivals California and Stanford also compete in that sport. Fencing was added for the 2014–15 school year after having been absent from the conference since 1980. Boston College, Duke, North Carolina, and Notre Dame have participated in that sport since that time, and 2024 addition Stanford also sponsors the sport.

Since all current ACC members (including non-football member Notre Dame) field FBS football teams, they are subject to the NCAA requirement that FBS schools field at least 16 teams in NCAA-recognized varsity sports. However, the ACC itself requires sponsorship of only four sports—football, men's basketball, women's basketball, and either women's soccer or women's volleyball. All ACC members sponsor all five of the named sports except Georgia Tech, which sponsors women's volleyball but not women's soccer.

Teams in ACC conference competition
Sport	Men's	Women's
Baseball	16	–
Basketball	18	18
Cross country	17	18
Fencing	5	5
Field hockey	–	9
Football	17	–
Golf	15	15
Gymnastics	–	6
Lacrosse	5	12
Rowing	–	12
Soccer	15	17
Softball	–	15
Swimming & diving	13.5	15
Tennis	16	17
Track and field (indoor)	17	18
Track and field (outdoor)	17	18
Volleyball	–	18
Wrestling	7	–

=== Men's sponsored sports by school ===
Member-by-member sponsorship of the 13 men's ACC sports for the 2026–27 academic year.

School	Baseball	Basketball	Cross country	Fencing	Football	Golf	Lacrosse	Soccer	Swimming & diving	Tennis	Track & field (indoor)	Track & field (outdoor)	Wrestling	Total ACC men's sports
Boston College	Yes	Yes	Yes	Yes	Yes	Yes	No	Yes	Yes	Yes	Yes	Yes	No	11
California	Yes	Yes	Yes	No	Yes	Yes	No	Yes	Yes	Yes	Yes	Yes	No	10
Clemson	Yes	Yes	Yes	No	Yes	Yes	No	Yes	No	Yes	Yes	Yes	No	9
Duke	Yes	Yes	Yes	Yes	Yes	Yes	Yes	Yes	Yes	Yes	Yes	Yes	Yes	13
Florida State	Yes	Yes	Yes	No	Yes	Yes	No	No	Yes	Yes	Yes	Yes	No	9
Georgia Tech	Yes	Yes	Yes	No	Yes	Yes	No	No	Yes	Yes	Yes	Yes	No	9
Louisville	Yes	Yes	Yes	No	Yes	Yes	No	Yes	Yes	Yes	Yes	Yes	No	10
Miami	Yes	Yes	Yes	No	Yes	No	No	No	Yes (Note: Miami participates in diving only. For the purposes of this chart, Miami men's diving is counted as sponsoring half of the sport of men's swimming & diving.)	Yes	Yes	Yes	No	7.5
North Carolina	Yes	Yes	Yes	Yes	Yes	Yes	Yes	Yes	Yes	Yes	Yes	Yes	Yes	13
NC State	Yes	Yes	Yes	No	Yes	Yes	No	Yes	Yes	Yes	Yes	Yes	Yes	11
Notre Dame	Yes	Yes	Yes	Yes	Yes (Note: Notre Dame plays football as an independent.)	Yes	Yes	Yes	Yes	Yes	Yes	Yes	No	12
Pittsburgh	Yes	Yes	Yes	No	Yes	No	No	Yes	Yes	No	Yes	Yes	Yes	9
SMU	No	Yes	No	No	Yes	Yes	No (Note: SMU will add men's lacrosse in the 2028 season (2027–28 school year).)	Yes	Yes	Yes	No	No	No	6
Stanford	Yes	Yes	Yes	Yes	Yes	Yes	No	Yes	Yes	Yes	Yes	Yes	Yes	12
Syracuse	No	Yes	Yes	No	Yes	No	Yes	Yes	No	No	Yes	Yes	No	8
Virginia	Yes	Yes	Yes	No	Yes	Yes	Yes	Yes	Yes	Yes	Yes	Yes	Yes	12
Virginia Tech	Yes	Yes	Yes	No	Yes	Yes	No	Yes	Yes	Yes	Yes	Yes	Yes	11
Wake Forest	Yes	Yes	Yes	No	Yes	Yes	No	Yes	No	Yes	Yes	Yes	No	9
Totals 2024–25	16	18	17	5	18	15	5	15	14.5	16	17	17	7	180.5

Men's varsity sports not sponsored by the Atlantic Coast Conference which are played by ACC schools:
School	Gymnastics	Ice hockey	Rowing (Note: Not governed or recognized by the NCAA.)	Rugby	Sailing	Skiing	Squash	Volleyball	Water Polo	Total non-ACC men's sports
Boston College	no	Hockey East	no	no	NEISA	EISA	no	no	no	3
California	MPSF	no	IRA	Independent	no	no	no	no	MPSF	4
Notre Dame	no	Big Ten	no	no	no	no	no	no	no	1
Stanford	MPSF	no	IRA	no	PCCSC	no	no	MPSF	MPSF	5
Syracuse	no	no	EARC	no	no	no	no	no	no	1
Virginia	no	no	no	no	no	no	MASC	no	no	1
Totals 2024–25	2	2	3	1	2	1	1	1	2	15

=== Women's sponsored sports by school ===
Member-by-member sponsorship of the 15 women's ACC sports for the 2024–25 academic year. The ACC began sponsoring women's gymnastics in 2023–24.

School	Basketball	Cross country	Fencing	Field hockey	Golf	Gymnastics	Lacrosse	Rowing	Soccer	Softball	Swimming & diving	Tennis	Track & field (indoor)	Track & field (outdoor)	Volleyball	Total ACC women's sports
Boston College	Yes	Yes	Yes	Yes	Yes	No	Yes	Yes	Yes	Yes	Yes	Yes	Yes	Yes	Yes	14
California	Yes	Yes	No	Yes	Yes	Yes	Yes	Yes	Yes	Yes	Yes	Yes	Yes	Yes	Yes	14
Clemson	Yes	Yes	No	No	Yes	Yes	Yes	Yes	Yes	Yes	No	Yes	Yes	Yes	Yes	12
Duke	Yes	Yes	Yes	Yes	Yes	No	Yes	Yes	Yes	Yes	Yes	Yes	Yes	Yes	Yes	14
Florida State	Yes	Yes	No	No	Yes	No	Yes	No	Yes	Yes	Yes	Yes	Yes	Yes	Yes	11
Georgia Tech	Yes	Yes	No	No	No	No	No	No	No	Yes	Yes	Yes	Yes	Yes	Yes	8
Louisville	Yes	Yes	No	Yes	Yes	No	Yes	Yes	Yes	Yes	Yes	Yes	Yes	Yes	Yes	13
Miami	Yes	Yes	No	No	Yes	No	No	Yes	Yes	No	Yes	Yes	Yes	Yes	Yes	10
North Carolina	Yes	Yes	Yes	Yes	Yes	Yes	Yes	Yes	Yes	Yes	Yes	Yes	Yes	Yes	Yes	15
NC State	Yes	Yes	No	No	Yes	Yes	No	No	Yes	Yes	Yes	Yes	Yes	Yes	Yes	11
Notre Dame	Yes	Yes	Yes	No	Yes	No	Yes	Yes	Yes	Yes	Yes	Yes	Yes	Yes	Yes	13
Pittsburgh	Yes	Yes	No	No	No	Yes	Yes	No	Yes	Yes	Yes	No	Yes	Yes	Yes	10
SMU	Yes	Yes	No	No	Yes	No	No	Yes	Yes	No	Yes	Yes	Yes	Yes	Yes	10
Stanford	Yes	Yes	Yes	Yes	Yes	Yes	Yes	Yes	Yes	Yes	Yes	Yes	Yes	Yes	Yes	15
Syracuse	Yes	Yes	No	Yes	No	No	Yes	Yes	Yes	Yes	No	Yes	Yes	Yes	Yes	11
Virginia	Yes	Yes	No	Yes	Yes	No	Yes	Yes	Yes	Yes	Yes	Yes	Yes	Yes	Yes	13
Virginia Tech	Yes	Yes	No	No	Yes	No	Yes	No	Yes	Yes	Yes	Yes	Yes	Yes	Yes	11
Wake Forest	Yes	Yes	No	Yes	Yes	No	No	No	Yes	No	No	Yes	Yes	Yes	Yes	9
Totals 2025–26	18	18	5	9	15	6	13	12	17	15	15	17	18	18	18	214

Women's varsity sports not currently sponsored by the Atlantic Coast Conference which are played by ACC schools:

School	Artistic swimming (Note: Not governed or recognized by the NCAA.)	Beach volleyball	Equestrian (Note: Part of the NCAA Emerging Sports for Women program.)	Ice hockey	Sailing	Skiing	Squash	Water polo	Total non-ACC women's sports
Boston College	no	no	no	Hockey East	NEISA	EISA	no	no	3
California	no	MPSF	no	no	no	no	no	MPSF	2
Florida State	no	Big 12	no	no	no	no	no	no	1
SMU	no	no	Independent	no	no	no	no	no	1
Stanford	MPSF	MPSF	no	no	PCCSC	no	Independent	MPSF	5
Syracuse	no	no	no	AHA	no	no	no	no	1
Virginia	no	no	no	no	no	no	MASC	no	1
Totals	1	3	1	2	2	1	2	2	14

=== Current champions ===
Season	Sport	Men's champion	Women's champion
Fall 2025	Cross country	Virginia	NC State
Fall 2025	Field hockey	–	North Carolina
Fall 2025	Football	Duke	–
Fall 2025	Soccer	SMU	Stanford
Fall 2025	Volleyball	–	Pittsburgh
Fall 2025	Volleyball	–	Stanford
Winter 2025–26	Basketball	Duke	Duke
Winter 2025–26	Fencing	Duke	Notre Dame
Winter 2025–26	Gymnastics	–	Clemson
Winter 2025–26	Swimming & diving	California	Virginia
Winter 2025–26	Track & field (Indoor)	Florida State	Clemson
Winter 2025–26	Wrestling	Virginia Tech	–
Spring 2026	Baseball	Georgia Tech	–
Spring 2026	Softball	–	Florida State
Spring 2026	Golf	Virginia	Stanford
Spring 2026	Lacrosse	Virginia	North Carolina
Spring 2026	Rowing	–	Stanford
Spring 2026	Tennis	Wake Forest	NC State
Spring 2026	Track & field (outdoor)	Virginia	Clemson

== Football ==
The ACC is considered to be one of the Power Four conferences, all of which receive automatic placement of their football champions into one of the six major bowl games. Seven of its members claim football national championships in their history, with two having won the now-defunct Bowl Championship Series (BCS) during its existence between 1998 and 2014 and one having won under the current College Football Playoff (CFP) system. Five of its members are among the top 25 of college football's all-time winningest programs. Three ACC teams, Florida State, Miami, and Clemson, are listed in the top 10 of most successful football programs since 2000.

=== Divisions and scheduling ===
In 2005, the ACC began divisional play in football. At the time, the ACC was the only NCAA Division I conference whose divisions were not divided geographically (e.g., north–south, East/West), but rather into Atlantic and Coastal (this arrangement continues today for the sports of baseball and men's soccer). The two division leaders then competed in the ACC Championship Game to determine the conference championship, which guarantees a berth in a New Year's Six bowl game. The inaugural Championship Game was played on December 3, 2005, in Jacksonville, Florida, at the venue then known as Alltel Stadium, in which Florida State defeated Virginia Tech to capture its 12th championship since it joined the league in 1992. Notre Dame began playing several ACC teams each year in 2014, but is not considered a football member and is not eligible to play in the ACC Championship Game.

Starting in 2005, the division format was as follows:

ACC Football Divisions (2005–2022)
Atlantic	Coastal
Boston College	Virginia Tech
Clemson	Georgia Tech
Florida State	Miami
Maryland (2005–2013); Louisville (2014–2022)	Virginia
NC State	North Carolina
Wake Forest	Duke
Syracuse (2013–2022)	Pittsburgh (2013–2022)

- One game against a designated permanent rival from the other division (not necessarily the school's closest traditional rival, even within the conference), similar to the SEC setup.
  - The permanent cross-division matchups are as follows, with the Atlantic Division member listed first: Boston College–Virginia Tech; Clemson–Georgia Tech; Duke–Wake Forest; Florida State–Miami; NC State–North Carolina; Maryland–Virginia (2005–2013) replaced by Louisville–Virginia (2014–2022); Syracuse–Pittsburgh (2013–2022).
- Play every school within its division (five games from 2005 to 2012, and six games from 2013 to 2022). Play three schools from the other division from 2005 to 2012, and two schools from the other division from 2013 to 2022.
- One rotating game against a team in the other division, for a total of two cross-division games.
  - Non-permanent cross-division opponents face each other in the regular season twice in a span of twelve years.
  - Prior to the addition of Syracuse and Pittsburgh in 2013, teams played two rotating cross-division games (for a total of three cross-division games), with a total of eight conference games. The addition of one team to each division meant the loss of one cross-division game per year.

For the 2020 season, changes were made to the football schedule model due to the COVID-19 pandemic. The use of divisions was suspended, with conference games being scheduled on a regional basis. The top two teams by winning percentage against conference opponents advanced to the ACC Championship Game. All teams played 10 conference games and were permitted to play one non-conference game of their choice as long as the game was played in-state. In addition, Notre Dame played an ACC conference schedule and was eligible to (and ultimately did) play in the ACC Championship Game.

On June 28, 2022, the ACC approved a new football schedule format, set to take effect in the 2023 season. Under this format, the conference will remove divisions, and instead play a 3–5–5 format, where each team plays 3 designated rivals every year along with two separate 5-team rotations that flip every other year, such that every team will have at least one home game and one away game against every other team in a four-year cycle (the standard length of a college player's career). Participation in the ACC championship game will also no longer be determined by the winners of the two divisions; the two teams with the highest conference winning percentage will play instead. The designated rivals under this system were as follows:

ACC permanent matchups (2023 only)
School	Rival 1	Rival 2	Rival 3
Boston College	Miami	Pittsburgh	Syracuse
Clemson	Florida State	Georgia Tech	NC State
Duke	North Carolina	NC State	Wake Forest
Florida State	Clemson	Miami	Syracuse
Georgia Tech	Clemson	Louisville	Wake Forest
Louisville	Georgia Tech	Miami	Virginia
Miami	Boston College	Florida State	Louisville
North Carolina	Duke	NC State	Virginia
NC State	Clemson	Duke	North Carolina
Pittsburgh	Boston College	Syracuse	Virginia Tech
Syracuse	Boston College	Florida State	Pittsburgh
Virginia	Louisville	North Carolina	Virginia Tech
Virginia Tech	Pittsburgh	Virginia	Wake Forest
Wake Forest	Duke	Georgia Tech	Virginia Tech

Additionally, this allows for each team to schedule four non-conference games. Since the 2014 season, one of the four non-conference games is against Notre Dame every two to three years, as Notre Dame plays against five ACC opponents in non-conference games each season. ACC members are also required to play at least one non-conference game each season against a team in the "Power 5" conferences since 2017. Games against Notre Dame also meet the requirement. In January 2015, the conference announced that games against another FBS independent, BYU, would also count toward the requirement. (Note: With BYU's move to the Big 12 in 2023, it will no longer be an independent.) This requirement can also be met by scheduling other ACC teams in non-conference games; the first example of this was also announced in January 2015, when North Carolina and Wake Forest announced that they would play a home-and-home non-conference series in 2019 and 2021.

With the 2024 arrival of California, SMU, and Stanford, the ACC adopted a new scheduling model effective that season and running through the 2030 season. A total of 16 matchups will be protected, with 11 retained from the 2023 model, two (Miami–Virginia Tech and NC State–Wake Forest) restored from the former divisional format, and the three new members filling the remaining three slots. All teams will play each other at least twice in the cycle (once home, once away). Each of the pre-2024 members will play three times in California during the cycle, and none will travel to California in back-to-back seasons.

ACC permanent matchups (2024–present)
School	Rival 1	Rival 2	Rival 3
Boston College	Pittsburgh	Syracuse	
California	SMU	Stanford	
Clemson	Florida State		
Duke	North Carolina	NC State	Wake Forest
Florida State	Clemson	Miami	
Georgia Tech	None		
Louisville	None		
Miami	Florida State	Virginia Tech	
North Carolina	Duke	NC State	Virginia
NC State	Duke	North Carolina	Wake Forest
Pittsburgh	Boston College	Syracuse	
SMU	California	Stanford	
Stanford	California	SMU	
Syracuse	Pittsburgh	Boston College	
Virginia	North Carolina	Virginia Tech	
Virginia Tech	Miami	Virginia	
Wake Forest	Duke	NC State	

=== Bowl games ===
The post-season bowl game tie-ins for the ACC for the 2026 seasons are as follows. If additional ACC teams are selected to participate in the College Football Playoff, all other bowl-eligible teams move up one spot in the order.

Pick	Name	Location	Opposing conference	Opposing pick
1	College Football Playoff	Misc.	All FBS Conferences	N/A
2/3/4	Holiday Bowl	San Diego, California	Legacy Pac-12 (Big Ten, Big 12, ACC)	3
2/3/4	Pop-Tarts Bowl	Orlando, Florida	Big 12	3
2/3/4	Gator Bowl	Jacksonville, Florida	SEC	3/4/5/6/7/8
5/6/7	Pinstripe Bowl	New York City	Big Ten	6
5/6/7	Duke's Mayo Bowl	Charlotte, North Carolina	SEC	3/4/5/6/7/8
5/6/7	Sun Bowl	El Paso, Texas	Legacy Pac-12 (Big Ten, Big 12, ACC)	4
8/9/10/11	Fenway Bowl	Boston, Massachusetts	American	1
8/9/10/11	Military Bowl	Annapolis, Maryland	American	2
9/10	Gasparilla Bowl	Tampa, Florida	ESPN Pool (SEC or American)	9/10 (SEC) or 3/4/5/6/7/8 (American)
9/10	Birmingham Bowl	Birmingham, Alabama	ESPN Pool (SEC or American)	9/10 (SEC) or 3/4/5/6/7/8 (American)

=== National championships ===
Although the NCAA does not determine an official national champion for Division I FBS football, several ACC members claim national championships awarded by various "major selectors" of national championships as recognized in the official NCAA Football Bowl Subdivision Records. Since 1936 and 1950 respectively, these include what are now the most pervasive and influential selectors, the Associated Press poll and Coaches Poll. In addition, from 1998 to 2013 the Bowl Championship Series (BCS) used a mathematical formula to match the top two teams at the end of the season. The winner of the BCS was contractually awarded the Coaches' Poll national championship and its AFCA National Championship Trophy as well as the MacArthur Trophy from the National Football Foundation. Maryland won one championship as a member of the ACC in 1953.

School	Claims of non-poll "major selectors"	Associated Press	Coaches Poll	Bowl Championship Series	College Football Playoff
California	1920, 1921, 1922, 1923, 1937				
Clemson		1981, 2016, 2018	1981, 2016, 2018		2016, 2018
Duke	1936 (Note: Duke has an NCAA recognized football National Championship from major selector Berryman(QPRS) from 1936, though Duke does not recognize the championship.)				
Florida State		1993, 1999, 2013	1993, 1999, 2013	1999, 2013	
Georgia Tech	1917, 1928, 1952		1990		
Miami		1983, 1987, 1989, 1991, 2001	1983, 1987, 1989, 2001	2001	
Pittsburgh	1915, 1916, 1918, 1929, 1931, 1934, 1936 (Note: A "list of college football's mythical champions as selected by every recognized authority since 1924" was printed in Sports Illustrated in 1967. Together with the 1976 national championship which would come later, the national championship selections listed by Sports Illustrated have since served as the historical basis of the university's national championship claims. For the 1934 season, the Sports Illustrated article included a selection by Parke Davis, then deceased, which had appeared the 1935 edition of the annual Spalding's Football Guide under Davis' byline. The 1934 selection is not documented in the Official NCAA Football Records Book with the rest of Pitt's claimed seasons, although additional major selections for Pitt, which are not claimed by the university, are listed in 1910, 1980, and 1981. College Football Data Warehouse recognizes nine championships for Pitt (1910, 1915, 1916, 1918, 1929, 1931, 1936, 1937, and 1976) out of the 16 years which it has documented that Pitt was named as a national champion by various selectors.)	1937, 1976	1976		
SMU	1935, 1981, 1982				
Stanford	1926, 1940				
Syracuse		1959	1959		

- Italics denote championships won before the school joined the ACC.
- In addition, non-football member Notre Dame claims 11 national titles. Many sources, however, credit the Fighting Irish with 13. See Notre Dame Fighting Irish football national championships for more details.

=== Intra-conference football rivalries ===
The members of the ACC have longstanding rivalries with each other, especially on the football field. The following is a list of active rivalries and protected annual matchups in the ACC with totals & records through the completion of the 2024 season.

Teams		Rivalry name	Trophy	Meetings	Record	Series leader	Current streak
Boston College	Clemson	Boston College–Clemson football rivalry	O'Rourke–McFadden Trophy	31	9–21–2	Clemson	Clemson won 12
Boston College	Pittsburgh	Boston College–Pittsburgh football rivalry	None	34	16–18	Pittsburgh	Boston College won 1
Boston College	Syracuse	Boston College–Syracuse football rivalry	None	58	24–34	Syracuse	Boston College won 2
Boston College	Virginia Tech	Boston College–Virginia Tech football rivalry	None	33	11–22	Virginia Tech	Virginia Tech won 3
California	SMU	California–SMU football rivalry	None	2	0–2	SMU	SMU won 2
California	Stanford	Big Game	Stanford Axe	127	51–65–11	Stanford	California won 4
Clemson	Boston College	Boston College–Clemson football rivalry	O'Rourke–McFadden Trophy	31	21–9–2	Clemson	Clemson won 12
Clemson	Florida State	Clemson–Florida State football rivalry	None	37	16–21	Florida State	Clemson won 1
Clemson	Georgia Tech	Clemson–Georgia Tech football rivalry	None	89	56–50–2	Georgia Tech	Clemson won 9
Clemson	NC State	Textile Bowl	Textile Bowl	92	61–30–1	Clemson	Clemson won 1
Duke	North Carolina	Duke–North Carolina football rivalry	Victory Bell	108	39–65–4	North Carolina	Duke won 1
Duke	NC State	Duke-NC State football rivalry	None	85	43–37–5	Duke	Duke won 2
Duke	Wake Forest	Duke-Wake Forest rivalry	None	102	60–40–2	Duke	Duke won 3
Florida State	Clemson	Clemson–Florida State football rivalry	None	37	21–16	Florida State	Clemson won 1
Florida State	Miami	Florida State–Miami football rivalry	Florida Cup	69	33–36	Miami	Miami won 1
Florida State	Virginia	Florida State–Virginia football rivalry	Jefferson-Eppes Trophy	19	15–4	Florida State	Virginia won 2
Georgia Tech	Clemson	Clemson–Georgia Tech football rivalry	None	89	51–36–2	Georgia Tech	Georgia Tech won 1
Georgia Tech	Virginia Tech	Georgia Tech–Virginia Tech football rivalry	None	21	9–12	Virginia Tech	Georgia Tech won 1
Louisville	Miami	Louisville–Miami football rivalry	Schnellenberger Trophy	18	5–12–1	Miami	Louisville won 1
Miami	Florida State	Florida State–Miami football rivalry	Florida Cup	69	36–33	Miami	Miami won 1
Miami	Louisville	Louisville–Miami football rivalry	Schnellenberger Trophy	18	12–5–1	Miami	Louisville won 1
Miami	Virginia Tech	Miami–Virginia Tech football rivalry	None	41	26–15	Miami	Miami won 4
North Carolina	Duke	Duke–North Carolina football rivalry	Victory Bell	108	65–39–4	North Carolina	Duke won 1
North Carolina	NC State	North Carolina–NC State football rivalry	None	114	68–40–6	North Carolina	NC State won 4
North Carolina	Virginia	South's Oldest Rivalry	None	129	66–60–4	North Carolina	Virginia won 1
North Carolina	Wake Forest	North Carolina–Wake Forest rivalry	None	111	73–36–2	North Carolina	North Carolina won 4
NC State	Clemson	Textile Bowl	Textile Bowl	92	30–61–1	Clemson	Clemson won 1
NC State	Duke	Duke-NC State football rivalry	None	85	37–43–5	Duke	Duke won 2
NC State	North Carolina	North Carolina–NC State football rivalry	None	114	40–68–6	North Carolina	NC State won 4
NC State	Wake Forest	NC State–Wake Forest rivalry	None	118	69–43–6	NC State	Wake Forest won 1
Pittsburgh	Boston College	Boston College–Pittsburgh football rivalry	None	34	18–16	Pittsburgh	Boston College won 1
Pittsburgh	Syracuse	Pittsburgh–Syracuse football rivalry	None	80	44–33–3	Pittsburgh	Pittsburgh won 1
SMU	California	California–SMU football rivalry	None	2	2–0	SMU	SMU won 2
SMU	Stanford	SMU–Stanford football rivalry	None	2	1–1	Even	SMU won 1
Stanford	California	Big Game	Stanford Axe	127	65–51–11	Stanford	California won 4
Stanford	SMU	SMU–Stanford football rivalry	None	2	1–1	Even	SMU won 1
Syracuse	Boston College	Boston College–Syracuse football rivalry	None	58	34–24	Syracuse	Boston College won 2
Syracuse	Pittsburgh	Pittsburgh–Syracuse football rivalry	None	80	34–43–3	Pittsburgh	Pittsburgh won 1
Virginia	Florida State	Florida State–Virginia football rivalry	Jefferson-Eppes Trophy	19	4–15	Florida State	Virginia won 2
Virginia	North Carolina	South's Oldest Rivalry	None	129	60–66–4	North Carolina	Virginia won 1
Virginia	Virginia Tech	Commonwealth Clash	Commonwealth Cup	105	38–62–5	Virginia Tech	Virginia won 1
Virginia Tech	Boston College	Boston College–Virginia Tech football rivalry	None	33	22–11	Virginia Tech	Virginia Tech won 3
Virginia Tech	Georgia Tech	Georgia Tech–Virginia Tech football rivalry	None	21	12–9	Virginia Tech	Georgia Tech won 1
Virginia Tech	Miami	Miami–Virginia Tech football rivalry	None	41	15–26	Miami	Miami won 4
Virginia Tech	Virginia	Commonwealth Clash	Commonwealth Cup	105	62–38–5	Virginia Tech	Virginia won 1
Wake Forest	Duke	Duke-Wake Forest rivalry	None	102	40–60–2	Duke	Duke won 3
Wake Forest	North Carolina	North Carolina–Wake Forest rivalry	None	111	36–73–2	North Carolina	North Carolina won 4
Wake Forest	NC State	NC State–Wake Forest rivalry	None	118	43–69–6	NC State	Wake Forest won 1

=== Interconference football rivalries ===
Notre Dame is a non-football member of the ACC, but has several rivalries with ACC members.

Teams		Rivalry name	Trophy	Meetings	Record	Series leader	Current streak	Opposing conference
Boston College	Boston University	Green Line Rivalry	None	32	27–4–1	Boston College	Boston College won 3	Program defunct since 1997
Boston College	Holy Cross	Boston College–Holy Cross football rivalry	None	84	50–31–3	Boston College	Boston College won 10	Patriot League (FCS)
Boston College	Notre Dame	Holy War	Ireland Trophy; Frank Leahy Memorial Bowl	27	9–17	Notre Dame	Notre Dame won 8	Independent
Boston College	UMass	Boston College–UMass football rivalry	None	27	22–5	Boston College	Boston College won 11	MAC
California	UCLA	California–UCLA football rivalry	None	94	35–57–1	UCLA	California won 1	Big Ten
Clemson	Alabama	Alabama–Clemson football rivalry	None	19	5–14	Alabama	Clemson won 1	SEC
Clemson	Auburn	Auburn–Clemson football rivalry	None	51	15–34–2	Auburn	Clemson won 4	SEC
Clemson	Georgia	Clemson–Georgia football rivalry	None	66	18–44–4	Georgia	Georgia won 3	SEC
Clemson	South Carolina	Clemson–South Carolina football rivalry	Palmetto Trophy	121	73–44–4	Clemson	South Carolina won 1	SEC
Florida State	Florida	Florida–Florida State football rivalry	Makala Trophy	68	28–38–2	Florida	Florida won 1	SEC
Georgia Tech	Alabama	Alabama–Georgia Tech football rivalry	None	52	21–28–3	Alabama	Georgia Tech won 1	SEC
Georgia Tech	Auburn	Auburn–Georgia Tech football rivalry	None	92	41–47–4	Auburn	Georgia Tech won 2	SEC
Georgia Tech	Georgia	Clean, Old-Fashioned Hate	None	118	41–72–5	Georgia	Georgia won 7	SEC
Georgia Tech	Tennessee	Georgia Tech–Tennessee football rivalry	None	44	17–25–2	Tennessee	Tennessee won 2	SEC
Georgia Tech	Vanderbilt	Georgia Tech–Vanderbilt football rivalry	None	39	20–16–3	Georgia Tech	Vanderbilt won 1	SEC
Louisville	Cincinnati	Cincinnati–Louisville football rivalry	The Keg of Nails	54	23–30–1	Cincinnati	Louisville won 1	Big 12
Louisville	Kentucky	Kentucky–Louisville football rivalry	Governor's Cup	37	17–19	Kentucky	Louisville won 2	SEC
Louisville	Memphis	Louisville–Memphis football rivalry	None	43	24–19	Louisville	Louisville won 4	AAC
Miami	Florida	Florida–Miami football rivalry	Seminole War Canoe Trophy	57	30–27	Miami	Miami won 1	SEC
Miami	Nebraska	Miami–Nebraska football rivalry	None	12	6–6	Even	Miami won 1	Big Ten
North Carolina	South Carolina	North Carolina–South Carolina football rivalry	None	60	36–20–4	North Carolina	North Carolina won 1	SEC
NC State	East Carolina	East Carolina–NC State football rivalry	Victory Barrel	33	19–14	NC State	East Carolina won 1	AAC
Pittsburgh	Duquesne	City Game	None	8	5–3	Pittsburgh	Duquesne won 1	Northeast Conference (FCS)
Pittsburgh	Notre Dame	Notre Dame–Pittsburgh football rivalry	None	73	21–50–1	Notre Dame	Notre Dame won 4	Independent
Pittsburgh	Penn State	Penn State–Pittsburgh football rivalry	None	100	43–53–4	Penn State	Penn State won 3	Big Ten
Pittsburgh	West Virginia	Backyard Brawl	None	107	63–41–3	Pittsburgh	Pittsburgh won 1	Big 12
SMU	Houston	Houston–SMU football rivalry	None	37	14–22–1	Houston	SMU won 1	Big 12
SMU	Navy	Navy–SMU football rivalry	Gansz Trophy	25	12–13	Navy	SMU won 4	AAC
SMU	North Texas	Safeway Bowl	None	43	36–6–1	SMU	SMU won 5	AAC
SMU	Rice	Rice–SMU football rivalry	Mayor's Cup	91	49–41–1	SMU	SMU won 1	AAC
SMU	TCU	SMU–TCU football rivalry	Iron Skillet	103	43–53–7	TCU	SMU won 1	Big 12
Stanford	Notre Dame	Notre Dame–Stanford football rivalry	Legends Trophy	38	14–23	Notre Dame	Notre Dame won 2	Independent
Stanford	San Jose State	Bill Walsh Legacy Game	None	68	52–15–1	Stanford	San Jose State won 1	MWC
Stanford	USC	Stanford–USC football rivalry	None	103	34–65–3	USC	USC won 2	Big Ten
Syracuse	Colgate	Colgate–Syracuse football rivalry	None	68	32–31–5	Syracuse	Syracuse won 17	Patriot League (FCS)
Syracuse	Penn State	Penn State–Syracuse football rivalry	None	71	23–43–5	Penn State	Penn State won 5	Big Ten
Syracuse	UConn	Syracuse–UConn football rivalry	None	13	6–5	UConn	Syracuse won 5	Independent
Syracuse	West Virginia	Syracuse–West Virginia football rivalry	None	61	34–27	Syracuse	Syracuse won 4	Big 12
Virginia	Maryland	Maryland–Virginia football rivalry	None	80	32–46–2	Maryland	Maryland won 4	Big Ten
Virginia Tech	VMI	VMI–Virginia Tech football rivalry	None	79	49–25–5	Virginia Tech	Virginia Tech won 3	SoCon (FCS)
Virginia Tech	West Virginia	Virginia Tech–West Virginia football rivalry	Black Diamond Trophy	54	23–30–1	West Virginia	West Virginia won 2	Big 12

== Basketball ==
=== History ===
The early roots of ACC basketball began primarily thanks to two men: Everett Case and Frank McGuire. Case accepted the head coaching job at North Carolina State. Case's North Carolina State teams dominated the early years of the ACC with a modern, fast-paced style of play. He became the fastest college basketball coach to reach many "games won" milestones. Case became known as The Father of ACC Basketball. Despite his success on the court, he may have been even a better promoter off-the-court. Case realized the need to sell his program and university. State started construction on Reynolds Coliseum in 1941. Case persuaded school officials to expand the arena to 12,400 people. It opened as the new home court for his team in 1949; at the time, it was the largest on-campus arena in the South. As such, it was used as the host site for many Southern Conference tournaments, ACC tournaments, and the Dixie Classic. The Dixie Classic brought in large revenues for all schools involved and soon became one of the premier sporting events in the South.

Partly to counter Case's success, North Carolina convinced Frank McGuire to come to Chapel Hill in 1952. McGuire knew that, largely due to Case's influence, basketball was now the major high school athletic event of the region. He not only tapped the growing market of high school talent in North Carolina, but also brought several recruits from his home territory in New York City as well. Case and McGuire literally invented a rivalry. Both men realized the benefits created through a rivalry between them. It brought more national attention to both of their programs and increased fan support on both sides.

After State was slapped with crippling NCAA sanctions before the 1956–57 season, McGuire's North Carolina team delivered the ACC its first national championship. During the Tar Heels' championship run, Greensboro entrepreneur Castleman D. Chesley noticed the popularity that it generated. He cobbled together a five-station television network to broadcast the Final Four. That network began broadcasting regular season ACC games the following season—the ancestor of the television package from Raycom Sports. From that point on, ACC basketball gained large popularity.

The ACC has been the home of many prominent basketball coaches besides Case and McGuire, including Terry Holland and Tony Bennett of Virginia; Vic Bubas and Mike Krzyzewski of Duke; Press Maravich, Norm Sloan and Jim Valvano of North Carolina State; Dean Smith and Roy Williams of North Carolina; Bones McKinney and Dave Odom of Wake Forest; Lefty Driesell and Gary Williams of Maryland; Bobby Cremins of Georgia Tech; Jim Boeheim of Syracuse; Jim Larrañaga of Miami; and Rick Pitino of Louisville.

=== Tournament as championship ===
Possibly Case's most lasting contribution is the ACC tournament, which was first played in 1954 and decides the winner of the ACC title. The ACC is unique in that it is the only Division I college basketball conference that does not recognize a regular season champion. This started when only one school per conference made the NCAA tournament. The ACC representative was determined by conference tournament rather than the regular season result. Therefore, the league eliminated the regular season title in 1961, choosing to recognize only the winner of the ACC tournament as conference champion. Fans and media do claim a regular-season title for the team that finishes first, and the NCAA recognizes a regular-season title winner in order to maintain its system of choosing NIT and NCAA tournament berths based on regular season placement. For the ACC, recognition of a regular season champion is insignificant as a 1975 NCAA rule change allowed more than one team per conference to earn a bid to the NCAA tournament. As a result, the team finishing atop the ACC regular-season standings has invariably been invited to the NCAA tournament even if it did not win the ACC Tournament. Even so, any claim to a regular season "title" remains unofficial and carries no reward other than top seed in the ACC tournament.

Historically, the ACC Tournament has been played in North Carolina and dominated by the four teams from Tobacco Road in North Carolina—North Carolina, Duke, North Carolina State and Wake Forest. Between them, they have won 50 tournament titles. The Virginia Cavaliers, however, have historically dominated the ACC regular season standings along with North Carolina and Duke. Between just these three programs they have 65 regular season titles. Since 2007, these three teams have finished first or tied for first 19 times in 18 years, with by far the most first-place finishes by North Carolina (9) and Virginia (7).

=== Present-day schedule ===
For 53 years, the ACC employed a double round-robin schedule in the regular season, in which each team played the others twice a season. With the expansion to 12 members by the 2005–2006 season, the ACC schedule could no longer accommodate this format. In the new scheduling format that was agreed to, each team was assigned two permanent partners and nine rotating partners over a three-year period. Teams played their permanent partners in a home-and-away series each year. The rotating partners were split into three groups: three teams played in a home-and-away series, three teams played at home, and three teams played on the road. The rotating partner groups were rotated so that a team would play each permanent partner six times, and each rotating partner four times, over a three-year period.

For the 2012–13 season, the 12-team in-conference schedule expanded to 18. Originally for the 2013–14 season, the expanded 14-team, 18-game schedule was to consist of a home and away game with a "primary partner" while the remaining conference opponents would have rotated in groups of three: one year both home and away, one year at home only, and one year away only. However, when Notre Dame was also added for the 2013–14 season, the now 15-team, 18-game schedule was modified so each school played two "Partners" home and away annually, two home and away, five home, and the other five away. In 2013–14, after 1 year at 18 games, women's basketball went back to a 16-game schedule where each team only plays 2 teams twice, rotating opponents each year over seven years and has no permanent partners. In 2019–2020, with the launch of the ACC Network, the men's schedule expanded to 20 games and the women's schedule expanded to 18 games.

The ACC and the Big Ten Conference held the ACC–Big Ten Challenge each season from 1999 to 2022. The competition was a series of regular-season games pitting ACC and Big Ten teams against each other. Each team typically plays one Challenge game each season, except for a few teams from the larger conference that are left out due to unequal conference sizes. The first ACC–Big Ten Women's Challenge was played in 2007, and had the same format as the men's Challenge. The series has since been replaced by the ACC–SEC Challenge.

=== National championships and Final Fours ===
Over the course of its existence, ACC schools have captured 15 NCAA men's basketball championships while members of the conference. North Carolina has won six, Duke has won five, NC State has won two, and Maryland and Virginia have each won one. Four more national titles were won by current ACC members while in other conferences—three by 2014 arrival Louisville and one by 2013 arrival Syracuse; Louisville was forced to vacate the third national title due to NCAA sanctions. Seven of the 12 pre-2013 members have advanced to the Final Four at least once while members of the ACC. Another pre-2013 member, Florida State, made the Final Four once before joining the ACC. All three schools that entered the ACC in 2013, as well as Louisville, advanced to the Final Four at least once before joining the conference. Two of the three schools that joined in 2024, Bay Area rivals California and Stanford, have each won one NCAA title.

Also notable are earlier national championships from historical eras prior to the dominance of the NCAA-administered championship. The ACC is often credited with forcing the NCAA tournament to expand to allow more than one team per conference, creating the at-large NCAA field common today. The Helms Athletic Foundation selected national champions for seasons predating the beginning of the NCAA tournament (1939), including North Carolina, Notre Dame, Pitt, Stanford, and Syracuse. Prior to the at-large era (1975), the National Invitation Tournament championship had prestige comparable to the NCAA championship, and Louisville, North Carolina, Maryland, and Virginia Tech won titles during this period (later NIT titles are not considered consensus national championships).

In women's basketball, ACC members have won three national championships while in the conference, North Carolina in 1994, Maryland in 2006, and Notre Dame in 2018. Notre Dame, which joined in 2013, also previously won the national title in 2001. In 2006, Duke, Maryland, and North Carolina all advanced to the Final Four, the first time a conference placed three teams in the women's Final Four. Both finalists were from the ACC, with Maryland defeating Duke for the title. One of the newest members, Stanford, won three national titles before joining the ACC (1990, 1992, 2021).

School	Pre-NCAA Helms Championships	NCAA Men's Championships	Men's NCAA Runner-Up	Men's NCAA Final Fours	NCAA Women's Championships	Women's NCAA Runner-Up	Women's NCAA Final Fours
California		1 (1959)	1 (1960)	3 (1946, 1959, 1960)			1 (2013)
Duke		5 (1991, 1992, 2001, 2010, 2015)	6 (Note: Duke has been the men's NCAA runner-up 6 times (1964, 1978, 1986, 1990, 1994, 1999))	18 (Note: Duke has reached the men's Final Four 18 times (1963, 1964, 1966, 1978, 1986, 1988, 1989, 1990, 1991, 1992, 1994, 1999, 2001, 2004, 2010, 2015, 2022, 2025))		2 (1999, 2006)	4 (1999, 2002, 2003, 2006)
Florida State			1 (1972)	1 (1972)			
Georgia Tech			1 (2004)	2 (1990, 2004)			
Louisville		3 (1980, 1986, 2013) (Note: Louisville's third national title, in 2013, was vacated due to NCAA sanctions.)		10 (Note: Louisville has reached the men's Final Four 10 times (1959, 1972, 1975, 1980, 1982, 1983, 1986, 2005, 2012, 2013). Two Final Four appearances (2012, 2013) were vacated due to NCAA sanctions.)		2 (2009, 2013)	4 (2009, 2013, 2018, 2022)
North Carolina	1 (1924)	6 (Note: North Carolina has won the NCAA men's championship six times (1957, 1982, 1993, 2005, 2009, 2017))	6 (1946, 1968, 1977, 1981, 2016, 2022)	21 (Note: North Carolina has reached the men's Final Four 21 times (1946, 1957, 1967, 1968, 1969, 1972, 1977, 1981, 1982, 1991, 1993, 1995, 1997, 1998, 2000, 2005, 2008, 2009, 2016, 2017, 2022))	1 (1994)		3 (1994, 2006, 2007)
NC State		2 (1974, 1983)		4 (1950, 1974, 1983, 2024)			2 (1998, 2024)
Notre Dame	2 (1927, 1936)			1 (1978)	2 (2001, 2018)	5 (2011, 2012, 2014, 2015, 2019)	7 (Note: Notre Dame has reached the women's Final Four 7 times (1997, 2001, 2011, 2012, 2013, 2014, 2015, 2018))
Pittsburgh	2 (1928, 1930)			1 (1941)			
SMU				1 (1956)			
Stanford	1 (1939)	1 (1942)		2 (1942, 1998)	3 (1990, 1992, 2021)	2 (2008, 2010)	15 (Note: Stanford has reached the women's Final Four 15 times (1990, 1991, 1992, 1995, 1996, 1997, 2008, 2009, 2010, 2011, 2012, 2014, 2017, 2021, 2022))
Syracuse	2 (1918, 1926)	1 (2003)	2 (1987, 1996)	6 (Note: Syracuse has reached the men's Final Four six times (1975, 1987, 1996, 2003, 2013, 2016))		1 (2016)	1 (2016)
Virginia		1 (2019)		3 (1981, 1984, 2019)		1 (1991)	3 (1990, 1991, 1992)
Wake Forest				1 (1962)			

Italics denotes honors earned before the school joined the ACC. Women's national championship tournaments prior to 1982 were run by the AIAW.

== Baseball ==
Nine ACC teams were selected to play in the 2025 NCAA Division I baseball tournament. The ACC has won the Men's College World Series twice: by Virginia in 2015 and Wake Forest in 1955. In addition, Miami won four titles before joining the ACC, and South Carolina has won two titles since leaving the league. Current member schools have appeared in the Men's College World Series a combined total of 97 times (including appearances before joining the conference). In 2008 and 2016, the ACC was ranked as the top baseball conference by Rating Percentage Index (RPI); the conference has ranked among the top three by this measure each of the past 14 years.

Men's College World Series / NCAA Tournament History
School	Men's College World Series Championships	Men's College World Series Appearances	Last MCWS Appearance	NCAA tournament Appearances	Last NCAA Appearance
Miami †	1982, 1985, 1999, 2001	25	2016	50	2025
Stanford †	1987, 1988	19	2023	37	2023
California †	1947, 1957	6	2011	14	2019
Virginia	2015	6	2024	21	2024
Wake Forest	1955	2	2023	18	2025
Florida State †		24	2024	61	2025
Clemson		12	2010	47	2025
North Carolina		12	2024	37	2025
Louisville †		6	2025	15	2025
Boston College †		4	1967	9	2023
Georgia Tech		3	2006	35	2025
Duke		3	1961	12	2025
NC State		4	2024	35	2025
Notre Dame †		3	2022	24	2022
Virginia Tech		0	n/a	11	2022
Pittsburgh		0	n/a	3	1995

^ Syracuse does not currently field a baseball team but has one appearance in the NCAA baseball tournament prior to joining the conference.
† The count of Men's College World Series appearances includes those made by the school prior to joining the ACC:

- Boston College: 4 appearances
- California: 6 appearances
- Florida State: 11 appearances
- Louisville: 3 appearances
- Miami: 21 appearances
- Notre Dame: 2 appearances
- Stanford: 19 appearances
- Syracuse: 1 appearance

== Field hockey ==
The ACC has won 22 of the 42 NCAA Championships in field hockey. Maryland won 8 as a member of the ACC.

National Championships
School	Total	NCAA Women's Championships
North Carolina	11	1989, 1995, 1996, 1997, 2007, 2009, 2018, 2019, 2020, 2022, 2023
Maryland	8	1987, 1993, 1999, 2005, 2006, 2008, 2010, 2011
Wake Forest	3	2002, 2003, 2004
Syracuse	1	2015

== Golf ==
Of the current ACC members, 14 sponsor both men's and women's golf, Georgia Tech sponsors only men's golf, Miami sponsors only women's golf, and Pitt and Syracuse do not sponsor the sport at all. Four team national championships in men's golf and seven national titles in women's golf have been won by ACC members while in the conference, led by the Duke women's team that has won seven national titles since 1999. In addition, 14 more team national titles, 11 in men's golf and 3 in women's golf, have been won by current ACC members before they joined the conference, led by Stanford (8 men's, 2 women's).

National Championships
School	Men's Team NCAA	Men's Individual NCAA	Women's Team NCAA	Women's Individual NCAA
California	2004	Max Homa 2013		Sarah Huarte 2004
Clemson	2003	Charles Warren 1997; Turk Pettit 2021		
Duke			7 (Note: Duke has won the women's golf championship 7 times (1999, 2002, 2005, 2006, 2007, 2014, 2019))	Candy Hannemann 2001, Virada Nirapathpongporn 2002, Anna Grzebian 2005, Virginia Elana Carta 2016
Georgia Tech		Watts Gunn 1927, Charles Yates 1934, Troy Matteson 2002, Hiroshi Tai 2024		
Miami			1984	Penny Hammel 1983
North Carolina		Harvie Ward 1949, John Inman 1984		
NC State		Matt Hill 2009		
Notre Dame	1944			
SMU	1954	Bryson DeChambeau 2015		
Stanford	8 (Note: Stanford has won the men's golf championship 8 times (1938, 1939, 1941, 1942, 1946, 1953, 1994, 2007, 2019))	Frank Tatum 1942, Tiger Woods 1996, Cameron Wilson 2014	2015, 2022	Rachel Heck 2021, Rose Zhang 2022, 2023
Virginia		Dixon Brooke 1940		
Wake Forest	1986, 1975, 1974	Curtis Strange 1974, Jay Haas 1975, Gary Hallberg 1979	2023	

- Italics denote championships won before the school joined the ACC.

== Lacrosse ==
Since 1971, when the first men's national champion was determined by the NCAA, the ACC has won 19 NCAA championships, more than any other conference in college lacrosse. Virginia has won seven NCAA Championships, North Carolina has won five, Duke has won three, and Notre Dame has won two. Former ACC member Maryland won two NCAA Championships as an ACC member. In addition, prior to the establishment of the NCAA tournament, Maryland had won nine national championships while Virginia won two. Syracuse, which joined the ACC in 2013, won ten NCAA-sponsored national championships, the most ever by any Division I lacrosse program, before joining the conference. Since 1987, the only years in which the national championship game did not feature a current ACC member were 2015, 2017, and 2022. SMU will become the sixth ACC member with men's lacrosse when it adds that sport in the 2028 season.

Women's lacrosse has awarded a national championship since 1982, and the ACC has won more titles than any other conference. In all, the ACC has won 14 women's national championships since the conference began sponsoring the sport in 1997: former ACC member Maryland won seven, North Carolina has won four, Boston College has won two, and Virginia has won one. Additionally, Maryland won four (plus one AIAW title in 1981) and Virginia two before 1997.

National Championships & Runner-Up Finishes
University	Men's NCAA Championships	Men's NCAA Runner-Up	Pre-NCAA Men's Championships	Women's NCAA Championships	Women's NCAA Runner-Up	Pre-NCAA Women's Championships
Boston College				2024, 2021	2023, 2022, 2019, 2018, 2017	
Duke	2014, 2013, 2010	2023, 2018, 2007, 2005				
Maryland	1975, 1973	2012, 2011, 1998, 1997, 1995, 1979, 1976, 1974, 1971	1967, 1959, 1956, 1959, 1940, 1939, 1937, 1936, 1928	2014, 2010, 2001, 2000, 1999, 1998, 1997, 1996, 1995, 1992, 1986	2013, 2011, 1994, 1991, 1990, 1985, 1984	1981
North Carolina	2016, 1991, 1986, 1982, 1981	1993		2025, 2022, 2016, 2013	2009	
Notre Dame	2023, 2024	2014, 2010				
Syracuse	2009, 2008, 2004, 2002, 2000, 1995, 1993, 1990*, 1989, 1988, 1983	2013, 2001, 1999, 1992, 1985, 1984	1925, 1924, 1922, 1920		2021, 2014, 2012	
Virginia	2021, 2019, 2011, 2006, 2003, 1999, 1972	1996, 1994, 1986, 1980	1970, 1952	2004, 1993, 1991	2007, 2005, 2003, 1999, 1998, 1996	

Italics denotes championships before it was part of the ACC.
* Syracuse vacated its 1990 championship due to NCAA violations.

== Soccer ==
Before the 2024 arrival of California, SMU, and Stanford, all of which sponsor men's soccer, that sport was one of the two ACC sports split into divisions. The divisional split was eliminated for 2024 and beyond. The final divisional setup was:

ACC Men's Soccer Divisions
Atlantic	Coastal
Boston College	Duke
Clemson	Notre Dame
Louisville	North Carolina
NC State	Pittsburgh
Syracuse	Virginia
Wake Forest	Virginia Tech

Fifteen of the 18 ACC schools sponsor men's soccer — a higher proportion than any of the other Power Four conferences. Only Georgia Tech, Florida State, and Miami do not sponsor soccer. Virginia has won 7 NCAA titles, and more since 1990 than any other university in the country. The ACC overall has won 19 national championships, including 16 of the 31 seasons between 1984 and 2014. Seven of the championships were won by Virginia, with the remaining nine by: Maryland (three times while they were in the ACC), Clemson (four times), North Carolina (twice), Duke, Wake Forest, Notre Dame, and Syracuse. Stanford, which joined in 2024, won three national titles before joining the ACC.

In women's soccer, North Carolina has won 22 of the 40 NCAA titles since the NCAA crowned its first champion, as well as the only Association for Intercollegiate Athletics for Women (AIAW) soccer championship in 1981. The Tar Heels have also won 22 of the 33 ACC tournaments. They lost in the final to North Carolina State in 1988 and Virginia in 2004, both times by penalty kicks. The 2010 tournament was the first in which they failed to make the championship game, falling to eventual champion Wake Forest in the semi-finals. The 2012 ACC tournament saw North Carolina's first quarterfinal loss, to the eventual champion Virginia; however, the Tar Heels went on to win the national title that season. In 2014, Florida State became the first school other than North Carolina to win the national championship as an ACC member. Notre Dame won three NCAA titles before it joined the ACC in 2013. The 2020 NCAA tournament, in which Florida State was national runner-up, was delayed until the spring of 2021 due to the COVID-19 pandemic, but is listed as 2020 to distinguish it from the 2021 season, which was played on the sport's traditional fall schedule. Stanford has won three women's national titles.

National Championships & Runner-Up Finishes
School	Men's NCAA Championships	Men's NCAA Runner-Up	Women's NCAA Championships	Women's NCAA Runner-Up	AIAW
Clemson	1984, 1987, 2021, 2023	1979, 2015			
Duke	1986	1982, 1995		1992, 2011	
North Carolina	2001, 2011	2008	22 (Note: North Carolina has won 22 NCAA Championships (1982, 1983, 1984, 1986, 1987, 1988, 1989, 1990, 1991, 1992, 1993, 1994, 1996, 1997, 1999, 2000, 2003, 2006, 2008, 2009, 2012, 2024))	1985, 1998, 2001	1981
Florida State			2014, 2018, 2021, 2023	2007, 2013, 2020	
Louisville		2010			
NC State				1988	
Notre Dame	2013		1995, 2004, 2010,	1994, 1996, 1999, 2006, 2008	
Stanford	2015, 2016, 2017	1998, 2002	2011, 2017, 2019	2009, 2010, 2023	
Syracuse	2022				
Virginia	1989, 1991, 1992, 1993, 1994, 2009, 2014	1997, 2019		2014	
Wake Forest	2007	2016		2024	

- Italics denote championships before the school was part of the ACC.

== Softball ==
=== National championships, Women's College World Series, and NCAA tournament appearances ===
The Atlantic Coast Conference has won the Women's College World Series only once when Florida State won it in 2018. The ACC has made an appearance in the national championship two other times, both by Florida State in 2021 and 2023.

Only ACC three schools have advanced to the Women's College World Series while they were members of the ACC: Florida State, Virginia Tech, and Duke; These three members combined for 11 WCWS appearances with Florida State making nine while Virginia Tech and Duke each have one appearance. California and Stanford each made the WCWS prior to joining the ACC with Cal winning one national championships.

School	Women's NCAA Championships	Women's NCAA Runner-Up	Women's NCAA College World Series Appearances	Women's NCAA Super Regional Appearances	Women's NCAA Tournament Appearances
Boston College					3 (1997, 1998, 2003)
California	1 (2002)	2 (2003, 2004)	12 (1986, 1992, 1996, 1999–2005, 2011, 2012)	16 (1986, 1992, 1996, 1999–2005, 2006, 2008–12)	36 (1986–2013, 2015–2018, 2023–24, 2025)
Clemson				3 (2022, 2023, 2025)	6 (2021–26)
Duke			1 (2024)	4 (2022–2024, 2026)	6 (2021–2026)
Florida State	1 (2018)	2 (2021, 2023)	12 (1987, 1990–91, 1992, 1993, 2002, 2004, 2014, 2016, 2018, 2021, 2023)	12 (2006, 2013–19, 2021, 2023–25)	38 (1986–91, 1992–96, 1998, 2000–2019, 2021, 2022–26)
Georgia Tech				1 (2009)	14 (2002–12, 2022, 2025, 2026)
Louisville					16 (2004–14, 2015, 2016, 2019, 2023, 2026)
NC State				1 (2015)	5 (2006, 2007, 2013–2015)
North Carolina					16 (2001, 2003–10, 2012, 2013, 2015–2017, 2019, 2025)
Notre Dame					27 (1994–96, 1999, 2000–2013, 2014–19, 2021, 2022, 2023)
Pittsburgh					1 (2015)
Stanford			4 (2001, 2004, 2023, 2024)	8 (2005, 2006, 2008, 2009, 2011, 2022–24)	23 (1998–2013, 2019, 2021–2025, 2026)
Syracuse				3 (2010–2012)	
Virginia					4 (2010, 2024–2026)
Virginia Tech			1 (2008)	3 (2008, 2021, 2022)	15 (2005–2008, 2012–2015, 2019, 2021–2026)

Seasons are listed by the calendar years in which they ended. Italics indicate honors earned before the school competed in the ACC. Miami, SMU, and Wake Forest do not field softball teams.

== Tennis ==
Of the current ACC members, 16 sponsor both men's and women's tennis, Syracuse sponsors only women's tennis, and Pitt does not sponsor the sport at all. Eight national championships in men's tennis and three national titles in women's tennis have been won by ACC members while in the conference, led by the Virginia men's team that has won six national titles since 2013. In addition, 38 more team national titles, 18 in men's tennis and 20 in women's tennis, have been won by current ACC members before they joined the conference, led by Stanford (17 men's, 20 women's).

National Championships
School	Men's Team NCAA	Men's Individual NCAA	Men's Doubles NCAA	Women's Team NCAA	Women's Individual NCAA	Women's Doubles NCAA
California			Clifton Mayne / Hugh Ditzler 1952, Doug Eisenman / Matt Lucena 1990, Matt Lucena / Bent-Ove Pedersen 1991		Suzi Babos 2006, Jana Juricova 2011	Amanda Augustus / Amy Jensen 1998, 1999, Claire Curran / Amy Jensen 2000, Christina Fusano / Raquel Kops-Jones 2003, Mari Andersson / Jana Juricová 2009
Duke				2009	Mallory Cecil 2009	
Georgia Tech				2007	Amanda McDowell 2008	
Miami		Andrew Burrow 1987	Pat Cramer / Luis García 1970		Audra Cohen 2007, Estela Perez-Somarriba 2019, Alexa Noel 2024	Lise Gregory / Ronni Reis 1986
North Carolina				2023	Jamie Loeb 2015	Sara Anundsen / Jenna Long 2007, Makenna Jones / Elizabeth Scotty 2021, Fiona Crawley / Carson Tanguilig 2023
NC State						Jaeda Daniel / Nell Miller 2022
Notre Dame	1959					
Stanford	17 (Note: Stanford has won the men's tennis championship 17 times (1973, 1974, 1977, 1978, 1980, 1981, 1983, 1986, 1988, 1989, 1990, 1992, 1995, 1996, 1997, 1998, 2000))	Alex Mayer 1973, John Whitlinger 1974, Matt Mitchell 1977, John McEnroe 1978, Tim Mayotte 1981, Dan Goldie 1986, Jared Palmer 1991, Alex O'Brien 1992, Bob Bryan 1998, Alex Kim 2000, Bradley Klahn 2010	Alex Mayer / Roscoe Tanner 1972, Alex Mayer / Jim Delaney 1973, John Whitlinger / Jim Delaney 1974, Chris Cocotos / Alex O'Brien 1992, Bob Bryan / Mike Bryan 1998, K. J. Hippensteel / Ryan Wolters 1999, Sam Warburg / KC Corkery 2004	20 (Note: Stanford has won the women's tennis championship 20 times (1982, 1984, 1986, 1987, 1988, 1989, 1990, 1991, 1997, 1999, 2001, 2002, 2004, 2005, 2006, 2010, 2013, 2016, 2018, 2019))	Alycia Moulton 1982, Linda Gates 1985, Patty Fendick 1986, 1987, Sandra Birch 1989, 1991, Debbie Graham 1990, Lilia Osterloh 1997, Laura Granville 2000, 2001, Amber Liu 2003, 2004, Nicole Gibbs 2012, 2013	Elise Burgin / Linda Gates 1984, Leigh-Anne Eldredge / Linda Gates 1985, Meredith McGrath / Teri Whitlinger 1990, Lauren Kalvaria / Gabriela Lastra 2002, Alice Barnes / Erin Burdette 2005, Hilary Barte / Lindsay Burdette 2010, Hilary Barte / Mallory Burdette 2011, Mallory Burdette / Nicole Gibbs 2012
Virginia	2013, 2015, 2016, 2017, 2022, 2023, 2026	Somdev Devvarman 2007, 2008, Ryan Shane 2015, Thai-Son Kwiatkowski 2017	Dominic Inglot / Michael Shabaz 2009, Drew Courtney / Michael Shabaz 2010, Jarmere Jenkins / Mac Styslinger 2013		Danielle Collins 2014, 2016, Emma Navarro 2021	Melodie Collard / Elaine Chervinsky 2025
Wake Forest	2018, 2025	Petros Chrysochos 2018			Bea Bielik 2002	

- Italics denote championships won before the school joined the ACC.

== Commissioners ==
Former Commissioner John Swofford

Name	Term
Jim Weaver	1954–1970
Norvall Neve (acting)	1970–1971
Bob James	1971–1987
Jack Fuzak (acting)	1987
Gene Corrigan	1987–1997
John Swofford	1997–2021
James J. Phillips	2021–present

== NCAA team championships ==
The Stanford Cardinal have the most NCAA titles of any program in the nation, and hold both the most men's and women's NCAA titles in the ACC. The California Golden Bears and Virginia Cavaliers hold the second- and third-most men's NCAA titles while the North Carolina Tar Heels and Virginia Cavaliers hold the second- and third-most women's NCAA titles in the conference. The Notre Dame Fighting Irish hold the most—and only—co-ed NCAA titles in the conference.

Excluded from these totals and list are any national titles earned outside the scope of NCAA competition, including Division I FBS football titles, women's AIAW championships, equestrian titles, and retroactive Helms Athletic Foundation titles. Unofficial NCAA boxing championships are also excluded, though they were earned inside the scope of NCAA competition.

School	Total	Men	Women	Co-ed	Nickname	Most successful sport (titles)
Stanford	138	71	67	0	Cardinal	Women's tennis (20)
North Carolina	52	13	39	0	Tar Heels	Women's soccer (22)
California	43	34	9	0	Golden Bears	Men's water polo (17)
Virginia	36	23	13	0	Cavaliers	Men's soccer (7), Men's lacrosse (7)
Notre Dame	27	10	7	10	Fighting Irish	Fencing (10)
Duke	17	9	8	0	Blue Devils	Women's golf (7)
Syracuse	15	14	1	0	Orange	Men's lacrosse (10)
Wake Forest	11	7	4	0	Demon Deacons	Field hockey (3), Men's golf (3)
Florida State	12	4	8	0	Seminoles	Women's soccer (5)
Clemson	8	8	0	0	Tigers	Men's soccer (4)
Boston College	7	5	2	0	Eagles	Men's ice hockey (5)
Miami	5	4	1	0	Hurricanes	Baseball (4)
NC State	6	2	4	0	Wolfpack	Women's cross country (4)
Southern Methodist	4	4	0	0	Mustangs	Men's outdoor track (2)
Louisville	2	2	0	0	Cardinals	Men's basketball (2)
Georgia Tech	1	0	1	0	Yellow Jackets	Women's tennis (1)
Pittsburgh	0	0	0	0	Panthers	N/A
Virginia Tech	0	0	0	0	Hokies	N/A
Total	384	210	164	10		

== Capital One Cup standings ==
The Capital One Cup is an award given annually to the best men's and women's Division I college athletics programs in the United States. Points are earned throughout the year based on final standings of NCAA Championships and final coaches' poll rankings.

Notre Dame (2014, 2022, 2024) has finished first for men's sports three times, and Virginia (2015 and 2019) has finished first twice. North Carolina (2013 and 2025) has twice finished first on the women's side.

The following table displays ACC top 25 finishes in the Capital One Cup, counting teams that participated in the ACC during that ranking year. T = tie.

School Year	Men	Women
2010–11	Virginia Cavaliers (2nd place); North Carolina Tar Heels (11th place); Florida State Seminoles (12th place); Duke Blue Devils (13th place); Maryland Terrapins (21st place)	North Carolina Tar Heels (9th place); Maryland Terrapins (12th place); Duke Blue Devils (16th place); Virginia Cavaliers (21st place); Florida State Seminoles (25th place)
2011–12	North Carolina Tar Heels (5th place); Florida State Seminoles (14th place); Maryland Terrapins (T19th place)	Duke Blue Devils (5th place); Florida State Seminoles (T14th place); Virginia Cavaliers (16th place)
2012–13	Duke Blue Devils (5th place); North Carolina Tar Heels (T9th place)	North Carolina Tar Heels (1st place); Duke Blue Devils (11th place); Maryland Terrapins (20th place)
2013–14	Notre Dame Fighting Irish (1st place); Virginia Cavaliers (4th place); Florida State Seminoles (5th place); Duke Blue Devils (8th place); Maryland Terrapins (T9th place)	Maryland Terrapins (4th place); North Carolina Tar Heels (10th place); Virginia Cavaliers (12th place); Duke Blue Devils (13th place); Florida State Seminoles (T14th place); Notre Dame Fighting Irish (19th place); Syracuse Orange (21st place)
2014–15	Virginia Cavaliers (1st place); Duke Blue Devils (6th place); Notre Dame Fighting Irish (T9th place); Syracuse Orange (21st place)	Florida State Seminoles (4th place); North Carolina Tar Heels (7th place); Virginia Cavaliers (11th place); Syracuse Orange (17th place); Duke Blue Devils (T18th place); Notre Dame Fighting Irish (T18th place)
2015–16	North Carolina Tar Heels (2nd place); Clemson Tigers (5th place); Syracuse Orange (11th place); Virginia Cavaliers (15th place)	North Carolina Tar Heels (T4th place); Syracuse Orange (T4th place); Florida State Seminoles (10th place); Duke Blue Devils (13th place); Virginia Cavaliers (T17th place); Notre Dame Fighting Irish (T24th place)
2016–17	North Carolina Tar Heels (3rd place); Clemson Tigers (6th place); Wake Forest Demon Deacons (11th place)	North Carolina Tar Heels (9th place); Boston College Eagles (12th place)
2017–18	Duke Blue Devils (3rd place); North Carolina Tar Heels (13th place); Wake Forest Demon Deacons (20th place)	Florida State Seminoles (5th place); Notre Dame Fighting Irish (7th place); Duke Blue Devils (10th place); North Carolina Tar Heels (15th place); Boston College Eagles (17th place)
2018–19	Virginia Cavaliers (1st place); Clemson Tigers (T6th place); Duke Blue Devils (14th place); Notre Dame Fighting Irish (17th place); Louisville Cardinals (T20th place); Wake Forest Demon Deacons (T23rd place)	North Carolina Tar Heels (3rd place); Florida State Seminoles (4th place); Notre Dame Fighting Irish (T10th place); Boston College Eagles (16th place); Duke Blue Devils (17th place)
2020–21	Virginia Cavaliers (T4th place); North Carolina Tar Heels (6th place); Notre Dame Fighting Irish (7th place); North Carolina State Wolfpack (17th place); Clemson Tigers (T19th place)	Florida State Seminoles (5th place); North Carolina Tar Heels (6th place); Boston College Eagles (11th place); Virginia Cavaliers (16th place); North Carolina State Wolfpack (18th place); Duke Blue Devils (T21st place); Syracuse Orange (T23rd place)
2021–22	Notre Dame Fighting Irish (1st place); Clemson Tigers (T5th place); Virginia Cavaliers (T17th place); North Carolina Tar Heels (T17th place)	Florida State Seminoles (5th place); North Carolina Tar Heels (6th place); Louisville Cardinals (9th place); North Carolina State Wolfpack (14th place); Virginia Cavaliers (T17th place); Boston College Eagles (T20th place)
2022–23	Virginia Cavaliers (5th place); Notre Dame Fighting Irish (T6th place); Duke Blue Devils (9th place); Syracuse Orange (T10th place); Wake Forest Demon Deacons (21st place); Miami Hurricanes (25th place)	North Carolina Tar Heels (3rd place); Florida State Seminoles (T6th place); Notre Dame Fighting Irish (11th place); Louisville Cardinals (12th place); Virginia Cavaliers (16th place); North Carolina State Wolfpack (17th place); Boston College Eagles (23rd place); Syracuse Orange (25th place)
2023–24	Notre Dame Fighting Irish (1st place); Clemson Tigers (T3rd place); North Carolina Tar Heels (9th place); Virginia Cavaliers (11th place)	Florida State Seminoles (6th place); Boston College Eagles (T7th place); North Carolina State Wolfpack (14th place); Pittsburgh Panthers (T17th place); Clemson Tigers (T20th place); Virginia Cavaliers (T20th place); North Carolina Tar Heels (23rd place)
2024–25	Notre Dame Fighting Irish (7th place); Wake Forest Demon Deacons (T15th place); Stanford Cardinal (23rd place); Duke Blue Devils (24th place)	North Carolina Tar Heels (1st place); Stanford Cardinal (2nd place); Duke Blue Devils (11th place); Louisville Cardinals (T15th place); Virginia Cavaliers (17th place); Wake Forest Demon Deacons (20th place); Boston College Eagles (T21st place); Notre Dame Fighting Irish (24th place); Pittsburgh Panthers (T25th place)
2025–26	North Carolina Tar Heels (T6th place); Notre Dame Fighting Irish (T9th place); Duke Blue Devils (11th place); Stanford Cardinal (T12th place); NC State Wolfpack (T16th place); Syracuse Orange (22nd place); Miami Hurricanes (T23rd place)	Stanford Cardinal (2nd place); Florida State Seminoles (6th place); Duke Blue Devils (8th place); North Carolina Tar Heels (10th place); Virginia Cavaliers (T13th place)

== Media ==
=== Current ===
- ESPN
- ACC Network (Launched in 2019, after a partnership with ESPN was announced in 2016)
- The CW (Started 2023; signed through spring 2027 and produced by Raycom Sports)

=== Former ===
- ACC Network (syndication package) (1982–2019)
- ACC on Regional Sports Networks (2011–2023)

== See also ==
- ACC Athlete of the Year
- Atlantic Coast Conference Men's Basketball Player of the Year
- List of Atlantic Coast Conference football champions
- List of Atlantic Coast Conference men's basketball regular season champions
- List of NCAA conferences
- ACC Women's Basketball regular season
- Atlantic Coast Rugby League
