= The Weavers (disambiguation) =

The Weavers are an American folk band.

The Weavers may also refer to:

- The Weavers: Wasn't That a Time!, a 1982 documentary film about the band
- The Weavers (1905 film), a silent documentary film
- The Weavers (play), an 1892 play by Gerhart Hauptmann
  - The Weavers (1927 film), a 1927 film adaptation of the play

== See also ==
- Weaver (disambiguation)
