= Ryan Alpert =

American athletic director

Current position
- Title: Athletic director
- Team: Georgia Tech
- Conference: ACC

Biographical details
- Education: University of South Carolina

Administrative career (AD unless noted)
- 2011–2016: University of Memphis (Assistant AD)
- 2016–2018: Missouri (Associate AD)
- 2018–2021: Florida Atlantic (Deputy AD)
- 2021–2025: Tennessee (Deputy AD)
- 2025–present: Georgia Tech

Ryan Alpert is an American university sports administrator. He serves as the athletic director at Georgia Tech.
