= Atlantic Coast Rugby League =

US college rugby union competition

- Sport: Rugby union
- Founded: 2010
- First season: 2011
- Folded: 2016; 10 years ago
- Commissioner: Patrick Kane
- No. of teams: 8
- Country: United States
- Last champion: Maryland (2nd title)
- Most titles: Maryland (2 titles)
- Website: atlanticcoastrugby.com

The Atlantic Coast Rugby League was an annual college rugby competition played every spring among eight universities—seven from the Atlantic Coast Conference, plus Navy (from the Patriot League). The league was disestablished in 2016.

== Member schools ==
The current 8 member schools of the ACRL were below. Most schools are members of the ACC and joined the ACRL in its year of inception in 2011. Navy was the first non-ACC member, and announced in 2012 it would be joining the ACRL for the 2013 season. The University of Maryland left the ACC to join the Big Ten Conference in July 2014.

Institution	Location	Enrollment	Nickname	Varsity Sports	Rugby Since	Head coach
Clemson University	Clemson, South Carolina	20,576	Tigers	19	1967	Justin Hickey
University of Maryland, College Park	College Park, Maryland	37,641	Terrapins	20	1968	Jeff Soeken
United States Naval Academy	Annapolis, Maryland	4,576	Midshipmen	30	1963	Mike Flanagan
University of North Carolina at Chapel Hill	Chapel Hill, North Carolina	29,340	Tar Heels	28	1966	Pete Earsman
North Carolina State University	Raleigh, North Carolina	34,767	Wolfpack	25	1965	Jim Latham
University of Virginia	Charlottesville, Virginia	20,895	Cavaliers	25	1961	Jon Roberts
Virginia Polytechnic Institute and State University	Blacksburg, Virginia	30,379	Hokies	21	1891 / 1968	Andy Richards
Wake Forest University	Winston-Salem, North Carolina	7,079	Demon Deacons	18	1973	Patrick Kane

=== Former ACRL members ===
- Georgia Tech (2010-2012)
- Duke University (2010-2011)

== Founding and early success ==
Organization of college rugby has been evolving since 2009, with many schools organizing into conferences similar to the traditional NCAA conferences. In November 2010, USARFU's college management committee set out a plan for transitioning universities to NCAA style conferences. The purpose of the realignment is for college rugby to capitalize on the marketability of major college conference rivalries.

The ACRL is one of the first college rugby conferences that re-aligned along traditional NCAA conference lines. In March 2010, eight of the twelve schools that participate in the NCAA's Atlantic Coast Conference (ACC) announced that they had formed the Atlantic Coast Rugby League (ACRL) and would begin play in spring 2011.

The ACRL was formed to improve rugby in the Atlantic Coast universities by capitalizing on traditional ACC rivalries, increasing the number of fans, attracting talented high school rugby players, and playing other regional schools, which would both reduce travel and create more competitive matchups with traditional college rivalries.

The ACRL quickly gained commercial success. The ACRL announced in February 2011, before it had even begun its inaugural season, that it has partnered with Adidas as its corporate sponsor.

== Leadership ==
Patrick Kane has served as the League Commissioner since the ACRL's founding in 2010. Kane also sits on USA Rugby's men's collegiate competition committee. Kane has been the Head Coach of the Wake Forest men's rugby team since 2004.

== Results ==
Year	Champion	Runner up	Third	Player(s) of the Year	Top Try Scorer(s)	Top Points Scorer	Coach of the Year
2011	Maryland	North Carolina	Virginia	Matias Cima (MD); Alex Lee (NC)	?	?	?
2012	Maryland	Clemson	Virginia Tech	Trevor Tanifum (MD); Amir Khan (NC)	Trevor Tanifum (MD); Amir Khan (NC)	S. Friend (Clem) (77)	Patrick Kane (WF)
2013 (spr)	Navy	Clemson	Virginia Tech	R. Neel-Feller (Navy)	?	?	Justin Hickey (Clem)
2013 (fall)	Clemson	Maryland	Virginia	Matias Cima (MD)	?	?	Jon Roberts (UVA)
2014							

Maryland won the 2011 inaugural ACRL, defeating North Carolina 39–32 in the title match held at Charlotte RFC. Maryland, by virtue of its conference championship, qualified for the national playoffs, but lost to Florida in the Round of 16.

In the 2012 season, the championship was determined based on final table standings, rather than a championship match. Maryland repeated as champion, despite the loss early in the season of Matias Cima, their flyhalf and 2011 ACRL co-player of the year. Maryland and Clemson both finished with a 6–1 record, but Maryland won the league table due to the bonus point earned in its 19–22 loss to North Carolina State. Maryland, by virtue of its conference championship, qualified for the national playoffs, but lost to Tennessee in the Round of 16.

2011
Points	Team
5-1	Maryland
6-0	North Carolina
4-1	Virginia
4-2	Clemson
3-3	Virginia Tech
2-4	North Carolina State
1-4	Wake Forest
1-5	Georgia Tech
0-6	Duke

2012
Points	Team
6-1	Maryland
6-1	Clemson
3-4	Virginia Tech
4-3	Wake Forest
4-3	North Carolina
3-4	North Carolina State
2-5	Virginia
0-7	Georgia Tech

Spring 2013
Points	Team
7-0	Navy
6-1	Clemson
4-2	Virginia Tech
4-3	Maryland
3-3	North Carolina State
2-5	Virginia
1-6	North Carolina
0-7	Wake Forest

Fall 2013
Points	Team
6-0	Clemson
5-1	Maryland
4-2	Virginia
3-3	Virginia Tech
1-5	Wake Forest
1-5	North Carolina
1-5	North Carolina State

Notes:

- Green shading indicates conference champion. Red shading indicates last year in conference.
- In 2011, despite North Carolina's undefeated regular season, Maryland was conference champion due to its 39–32 victory over NC in the championship game.
- In 2012, Virginia Tech finished third, despite its 3–4 record, due to its 9 bonus points (6 from tries, 3 from losses).
- In spring 2013, Navy elected to play in the Varsity Cup post-season competition, meaning that runner-up Clemson participated in the USA Rugby Division I-AA playoffs instead.
- In 2013, the ACRL switched from a spring schedule to a fall schedule, resulting in two tables for 2013. The Fall 2013 champion, Clemson, qualified for post-season play in the newly formed American Collegiate Rugby Championships.

== Atlantic Coast Invitational (ACRL 7s) ==
The Atlantic Coast schools started moving in the direction of setting up their own conference in 2008, beginning with the Atlantic Coast Invitational tournament. The ACI tournament was co-founded by Andy Richards (Head Coach, North Carolina) and by Patrick Kane (Head Coach, Wake Forest). The ACI tournament is one of a number of college rugby tournaments that are tapping into the increased interest of sevens while also targeting traditional collegiate conference rivalries.

The Atlantic Coast Invitational tournament changed to a sevens format in 2010. The ACI was switched to a 7s tournament this season in response to 7s becoming an Olympic sport and in the wake of the success of the Collegiate Rugby Championship which was broadcast live by NBC. The ACI tournament also experienced commercial success in 2010, landing USA Sevens as tournament sponsor.

Beginning in 2011, the winner of the Atlantic Coast Invitational has advanced to the USA Rugby National Championship. N.C. State won the ACI tournament in 2011 defeating Virginia 24–17 in the final.

Year	Location	Champion	Final score	Runner up	Tournament MVP
2008	Raleigh, NC	Virginia	--	Maryland	--
2009	Tallahassee, FL	Boston College	--	North Carolina	--
2010	Greensboro, NC	North Carolina State	24-12	North Carolina	Will Teague (N.C. State)
2011	Greensboro, NC	North Carolina State	24-17	Virginia	Bryan Maxwell (N.C. State)
2012	Virginia Beach, VA	Virginia Tech	33-31	Virginia	--
2013		Navy	57-0	North Carolina St.	--

== Atlantic Coast Invitational Rugby 7s Series ==
The Atlantic Coast Rugby League announced in March 2012 the creation of a new competition for member schools—the Atlantic Coast Invitational Rugby 7s Series—to begin in the fall of 2012. The ACRL 7s Series consists of four one-day tournaments of 8-12 teams played at various ACRL venues throughout the fall of 2012. The Series leads up to the two-day Atlantic Coast Rugby 7s Championship played later in the fall. The ACRL's reasons for developing this series was due to the increasing popularity of rugby sevens throughout the United States since the 2009 announcement that rugby sevens would be added to the Olympics. Clemson head coach Justin Hickey believes that this new Rugby 7s Series gives the ACRL "the opportunity to set the standard on how Rugby 7s operates and competes at the collegiate level."

Year	Virginia Tech 7s	Maryland 7s	AC Invitational 7s
2012	Virginia Tech (1st); NC State (2nd)	Kutztown (1st); Navy (2nd)	Virginia Tech (1st); Virginia (2nd)
