= James Weaver =

James or Jim Weaver may refer to:

== Politics ==
- James Weaver (Wisconsin politician) (1800–1886), member of the Wisconsin State Assembly
- James B. Weaver (1833–1912), United States Representative from Iowa and presidential candidate
- James D. Weaver (1920–2003), United States Representative from Pennsylvania
- Jim Weaver (Oregon politician) (1927–2020), United States Representative from Oregon
- James H. Weaver (Alabama politician), Secretary of State of Alabama, 1856–1860

== Sports ==
- James Weaver (racing driver) (born 1955), British racing driver
- Jim Weaver (athletic director) (1945–2015), director of athletics, most recently at Virginia Tech, previously an American football player and coach
- Jim Weaver (basketball) (1919–1992), American basketball coach
- Jim Weaver (left-handed pitcher) (born 1939), Major League Baseball pitcher
- Jim Weaver (outfielder) (born 1959), Major League Baseball outfielder
- Jim Weaver (right-handed pitcher) (1903–1983), Major League Baseball pitcher
- Jim Weaver (sportsperson) (1903–1970), head football coach and athletic director at Wake Forest, commissioner of the Atlantic Coast Conference
- Red Weaver (James Redwick Weaver; 1897–1968), American football player and coach

== Other people ==
- James Henry Weaver (1883–1942), American mathematician
- James R. N. Weaver (1888–1967), American general
- Jim Weaver (chef), chef, author and pioneer in the Slow Food movement
