= Bob James (commissioner) =

Robert C. James (January 28, 1921 – May 11, 1987) was an American sports executive who was commissioner of the Mid-American Conference from 1964 to 1971 and the Atlantic Coast Conference from 1971 until his death in 1987.

== Early life ==
James graduated from John Harris High School in Harrisburg, Pennsylvania and the Bullis School in Silver Spring, Maryland. He lettered in football at the University of Maryland in 1941 and 1942. He was a captain in the United States Army during World War II, serving as an instructor at the Officer Candidate School at Fort Benning before being sent to Europe. He returned to Maryland for the 1946 football season and graduated in 1947. He also lettered in basketball and track for the Terrapins.

== Career ==
After graduating, James remained at Maryland as associate dean of men. In 1959, he was appointed assistant director of athletics for administration at the United States Air Force Academy.

In 1964, James became commissioner of the Mid-American Conference. He relocated the conference's office to Columbus, Ohio, then the geographical center of the league.

In 1970, James was named commissioner of the Atlantic Coast Conference, succeeding the deceased Jim Weaver. He took office on March 1, 1971 During his tenure, expanded from 13 sports to 21 and began sponsoring women's sports for the first time. Its teams won 23 national championships, including three in men's basketball and one in football.

In the spring of 1987, James was diagnosed with liver and lung cancer. He planned on retiring as commissioner on July 1, 1988, but died on May 11, 1987 at the Duke University Medical Center.

== Honors ==
James was inducted into the MAC Hall of Fame in 1989 and the University of Maryland Athletics Hall of Fame in 1994.
