= Jim Phillips (athletic administrator) =

Commissioner of the Atlantic Coast Conference since 2021

- Phillips in 2026

Current position
- Title: Commissioner
- Conference: ACC

Biographical details
- Born: Chicago, Illinois, U.S.

Administrative career (AD unless noted)
- 2004–2008: Northern Illinois University
- 2008–2021: Northwestern University
- 2021–present: ACC Commissioner

James J. "Jim" Phillips is an American college athletic administrator. He currently serves as Commissioner of the Atlantic Coast Conference (ACC), a role he began in 2021.

== Early life and education ==
Phillips was born and raised in Chicago, the youngest of 10 children and a first-generation college graduate. His father, John Phillips, was a design engineer and veteran of the United States Navy. His mother Anita Phillips was a stay at home mother.

Phillips began his career on the coaching side as a basketball team manager and student assistant at the University of Illinois Urbana-Champaign. He went on to serve as a graduate assistant coach and later an assistant basketball coach at Arizona State University before transitioning to athletics administration work in 1997.

Phillips earned a Ph.D. in administration from the University of Tennessee, a master's degree in education from Arizona State University and an undergraduate degree from the University of Illinois.

== Career ==
=== Early career ===
Phillips began his career in athletics administration as part of the external relations department at Arizona State followed by his service at the University of Tennessee from 1998 to 2000. He served as the Associate Director of Athletics, then Senior Associate Director of Athletics for External Affairs at University of Notre Dame from 2000 to 2004. He served as the athletic director at Northern Illinois University from 2004 to 2008.

=== Northwestern University ===
He subsequently served as the athletic director of Northwestern University from 2008 to 2021. During Phillips' tenure at Northwestern University, he was noted for being "a constant presence" at Wildcats games and for his solidarity with athletes. Shannon Ryan of the Chicago Tribune described Phillips as "leading the NU athletic program with a parental tone", and overseeing improvements to the university's athletic facilities, which were considered subpar before his tenure. Welsh–Ryan Arena received a $110 million renovation in 2018. That year, the university also unveiled a $270 million athletics complex, which includes Ryan Fieldhouse and Wilson Field.

In 2012 and 2016, Phillips was named Athletic Director of the Year by the National Association of Collegiate Directors of Athletics (NACDA). In 2018, he was Sports Business Journal's Athletic Director of the Year. The NCAA named him a Champion of Diversity and Inclusion in 2019, and a Champion of Inclusion in 2020.

He was the first athletic director on the NCAA Board of Directors and Board of Governors. In 2015, he was the inaugural chair of the NCAA Division I Council. He later served on the Division I Men’s Basketball Selection Committee, Division I Women’s Basketball Selection Committee and Men’s Basketball Oversight Committee. In 2021, Phillips was also selected to serve on the NCAA Constitution Review Committee, and the NCAA Division I Transformation Committee.

In 2023, lawsuits filed by civil rights attorney Benjamin Crump alleging that Phillips and Northwestern University had ignored hazing and abuse in its football program. Phillips was dismissed from the lawsuits in 2024.

=== Atlantic Coast Conference ===
In 2021, Phillips became commissioner of the Atlantic Coast Conference. Brendan Marks of The Athletic commented that "one of the key reasons the ACC picked Phillips [...] was his unrelenting belief in the soul of all this: in education, in the value of opportunities for young people, in geographic proximity and regional rivalries that bind our communities together." In October 2021, Phillips announced that the ACC headquarters was relocating. It was moved from its original headquarters in Greensboro, North Carolina to a new location in Charlotte, North Carolina in 2023.

During his tenure as commissioner, the conference has undergone numerous changes in an effort to boost revenue. He has led talks to eliminate divisions, and led a shift to a 24/7, 365 day calendar in football. This shift followed lengthy debates regarding the new calendar's relationship to athlete health and safety, as well as academics. In 2024, the ACC announced that it would move forward with a football calendar that included 17 schools and no divisions, and that the number of conference matchups would be increased from 56 to 68. The number of teams in the College Football Playoff was also increased from four teams to twelve teams.

Phillips has advocated for increased recognition of women's sports, and the conference has the highest number of women's sports offerings in the Power Five. Women's gymnastics was added to the conference's list of sponsored sports in 2023, bringing it to a total of 28 sponsored sports, as part of Phillips' prioritization of broad-based programming.

The ACC currently has the highest number of NCAA tournament wins, and the most appearances in the Final Four, Elite Eight, and Sweet 16 playoffs. The conference generated over $700 million in annual revenue for the first time in 2023. The ACC has also taken steps to modernize its marketing and branding strategies. In August 2023, the conference launched the annual "Accomplish Greatness" multimedia campaign, which highlights the ACC's athletic and academic achievements for the year. The conference launched a program of VIP seating and premium fan experiences in 2024, which are expected to increase revenue from championship games by 5-10%.

Phillips vocally opposed Florida State University (FSU) and Clemson University's attempts to file lawsuits attacking the grant of rights agreements that give the ACC broadcasting rights to their members' home games. The Clemson and FSU lawsuits, as well as the ACC's countersuits, were eventually settled in March 2025. He led the ACC's transition to becoming a national conference by admitting the University of California, Berkeley (California), Southern Methodist University (SMU), and Stanford University, with their membership beginning in 2024. California and Stanford played their first ACC home games in October 2024.

Under Phillips' leadership, the ACC announced its endorsement of a success incentive initiative in for the 2024-25 season. This initiative is designed to incentivize investment by awarding proportional revenue to high-performing schools. In 2024, Phillips stated that he expected women's basketball would become a part of success initiatives in the near future.

In October 2024, Phillips was appointed to the NCAA board of governors. He also serves on its executive committee and chairs its finance and audit committee. He serves as Vice President of the Collegiate Commissioners Association, and began serving as President for the 2024-2025 academic year. He was one of Business NC's "Executives of the Year" in 2024.

== Personal life ==
Phillips has been described by Sports Illustrated writer Pat Forde as "an emphatic Catholic" and "punctilious in the practice of worship" who attends daily mass. He met his wife Laura, herself the youngest of seven children from a Chicago Catholic family, while they were both attending the University of Illinois. They have five children together. The Phillips family are involved in a number of charitable and community initiatives. During the 2022 and 2023 Orange Bowl games, the Phillips family volunteered at Camillus House, a charity which benefits the homeless of Miami.
