= Weever (disambiguation) =

A weevers, or Weeverfish, are a group of fish species in the family Trachinidae.

Weever may also refer to:

== People ==
- Guy E. L. de Weever (1907–1971), Guyanese educator
- John Weever (1576–1632), English poet
- Nicole de Weever (born 1979), dancer from Sint Maarten

== See also ==
- Weevil (disambiguation)
- Weaver (disambiguation)
