= Weaver Lake =

Weaver Lake may refer to:

- Weaver Lake (Michigan)
- Weaver Lake (New York)
