= Weaver (company) =

Office software company from Shanghai, China

Weaver (泛微)
- Weaver Network Technology Co., Ltd.
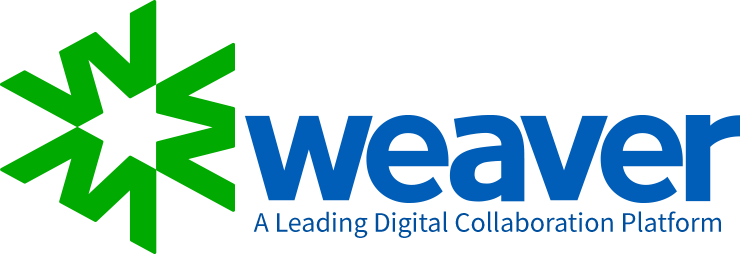

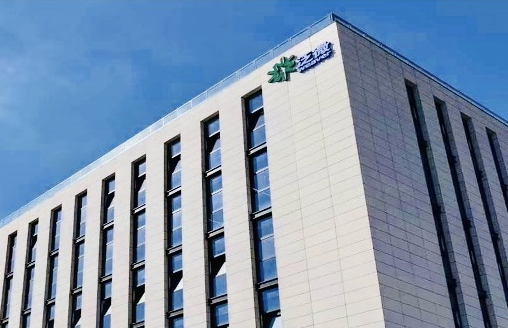
- Formation: 14 March 2001
- Founder: Wei Lidong
- Type: Listed in Shanghai Stock Exchange (SSH: 603039)
- Headquarters: Shanghai, China
- Location: China, Singapore, Malaysia, Indonesia, Thailand, Vietnam, Australia
- Products: Office Automation (OA) Software E-cology, e-office, SuperApp, e-builder
- Fields: Collaborative Management Software
- Subsidiaries: Weaver Network International Pte. Ltd. and Weaver Network (Malaysia) Sdn. Bhd.
- Staff: 10,000+
- Website: www.weaver.com.co; www.weaver.com.cn
- Formerly called: Shanghai Weaver Network Technology Co., Ltd.

Weaver, officially known as Weaver Network Technology Co., Ltd., formally Shanghai Weaver Network Technology Co., Ltd. (/ˈwvər/; Chinese: 泛微网络科技股份有限公司; pinyin: fàn wēi; 泛 fàn 微 wēi) is a Chinese technology corporation established in 2001 and headquartered in Shanghai, China.

The corporation specialises in the field of collaborative management software (or known as Office Automation (OA)), assisting organisations in building a unified digital operating platform that promotes digital collaboration and providing workflow automation solutions to clients in various industries.

The company is recognised as a "Key Software Enterprise within the National Planning Layout".("国家规划布局内重点软件企业")

The company is listed on the Shanghai Stock Exchange (SHA: 603039) and has its APAC regional headquarters located in Singapore.

== Investor relations ==
The company is listed on the main board of Shanghai Stock Exchange (Stock Code: 603039).

== History ==
=== Initial public offering ===
On January 13, 2017, Weaver went public on the Shanghai Stock Exchange (SHA:603039). The company is the solitary enterprise listed on the main board of the Shanghai Stock Exchange within the domestic Office Automation (OA) industry. The company raised 1.2 billion yuan ($180 million) in its initial public offering.

After going public, Weaver increased its capital to Shanghai CA, further enhancing the integration of identity authentication, electronic signature (or digital signature), electronic seals, and digital contracts in its existing collaborative management software applications.

=== Strategic partners ===
On 26 July 2020, Weaver announced in the evening that the company's shareholder, Wei Jinkun (韦锦坤), intends to transfer 5% of the shares of the listed company through an agreement to Shenzhen Tencent Industrial Investment Fund Co., Ltd. (referred to as Tencent Industrial Fund).

On 22 October 2020, Tencent leveraged the integration of WeCom (formally known as WeChat Work or Enterprise WeChat), Weaver and WeCom collaborated to create a "customer-centric" collaborative mobile office platform.

In 2019, Weaver expanded into the Asia-Pacific (APAC) market by setting up regional headquarter in Singapore as Weaver International, branches in Malaysia and Indonesia.
