= Brian White =

Brian White may refer to:

== Sports ==
- Brian White (American football) (born 1964), American football coach and former player
- Brian White (cricketer) (born 1944), former English cricketer
- Brian White (Gaelic footballer), Irish sportsman
- Brian White (ice hockey) (born 1976), American ice hockey player
- Brian White (referee), Gaelic football referee
- Brian White (soccer) (born 1996), American soccer player

== Others ==
- Brian White (British politician) (1957–2016), former British Labour Party Member of Parliament
- Brian White (Canadian politician) (born 1951), former Canadian Progressive Conservative Member of Parliament
- Brian White (cartoonist) (1902–1984), British cartoonist famous for 'The Nipper'
- Brian White (mathematician), professor at Stanford University
- Brian J. White (born 1975), actor on TV series The Shield and film The Game Plan
- W. Brian White (born 1967), American politician in the South Carolina House of Representatives

== See also ==
- Bryan White (born 1974), American country music singer
  - Bryan White (album)
- Bryan D. White, Welsh mayor
