= George Weaver =

George Weaver may refer to:

- George Weaver (educator) (1872–1939), American educator and physician
- Buck Weaver George Daniel Weaver (1890–1956), American baseball player
- George Weaver (politician) (1908–1986), Canadian Member of Parliament and engineer
- George L. P. Weaver (1912–1995), American trade unionist and civil rights activist
