= Brittanie Weaver =

American fashion model (born 1989)

- Born: July 6, 1989 (age 37); San Diego, California
- Spouse: Shane Costa
- Children: 1
- Modeling information
- Height: 5 ft 9 in (1.75 m)
- Hair color: Dark blonde
- Eye color: Green
- Website: www.brittanieweaver.com

Brittanie Weaver (born July 6, 1989) is an American fashion model.

== Early life ==
Brittanie Weaver was born on July 6, 1989, in San Diego, California, the youngest child with three brothers. Within a year she had already been on multiple national TV commercials and a series regular on a show on Comedy Central. She took many acting and modeling courses to further her career and after graduating from high school she moved to Los Angeles, California, to be a professional model and actress. Since living in LA she has appeared in numerous fashion, commercial and swimsuit campaigns as a model and actress. She has worked on sets from ER to Gossip Girl and with producer Jon Avnet (exec producer of Black Swan).

First assistant director of the film Twilight, Jamie Marshall, stated that Weaver was a chameleon of all sorts with a forever changing face from one shot to the other. "I was so pleased to find that she is incredibly normal, and has a wonderfully kind of dark, perverse sense of humor. She added depth, sensibility and spontaneity to my work and I would jump to the chance to collaborate again."

== Career and education ==
Brittanie started acting at the age of 8 after being scouted and joined Screen Children's Agency in Los Angeles, California. She has been featured as herself in a global campaign for Phillips Electronics, as well as being featured as a European dancer in a nationwide campaign for PNC Bank. She was a feature printed on an apparel line printed on men's and women's clothing found nationwide in stores such as Zumiez, PacSun, Tillys and Nordstrom.

She is also a full-time honor student at Arizona State University working towards her degree in communications to further her career in the entertainment industry. Weaver contributes as creative director for her family's non-profit habitat restoration company that aids in the “Go Green” movement towards the environment.

Brittanie was a victim in an upskirt crime that grabbed national headlines as she was able to catch the stranger on her own. She aided law enforcement and worked with attorney, Gloria Allred to raise awareness of the severity of sexual crimes with technology. They are currently working together to lobby a bill to raise upskirt crimes from a misdeamonor to a felony.
