= Weaver Lake (Michigan) =

- Location within Michigan
- Location: Berrien County, Michigan
- Coordinates: 41°50′05″N 86°23′58″W
- Type: lake
- Surface area: 30.463 acres (0.12328 km^{2})

Weaver Lake is a lake in Berrien County, in the U.S. state of Michigan. It has a size of 30.463 acres (12.328 ha).

Weaver Lake has the name of John Weaver, a pioneer who settled at the lake in 1837.
