= Michael Weaver =

Michael or Mike Weaver may refer to:

- Michael Weaver (golfer) (born 1991), American amateur golfer
- Mike Weaver (boxer) (born 1952), former boxer and WBA heavyweight champion
- Mike Weaver (ice hockey) (born 1978), Canadian ice hockey defenceman
- Mike Weaver (politician), American politician and retired military officer

== See also ==
- Mick Weaver (born 1944), English session musician
