= Weavers, New South Wales =

Rural area in New South Wales, Australia

Coordinates: 33.4235°S 150.9788°E

Weavers is a historical locality of Sydney, in the state of New South Wales, Australia. It is located in the City of Hawkesbury east of Leets Vale.
