= Boll weevil (disambiguation) =

Boll weevil may refer to:

- Boll weevil, a beetle
- Boll weevil (politics), an American political term used in the mid- and late-20th century
- Boll Weevil (restaurant), a restaurant chain
- Boll Weevil Monument, a monument in Enterprise, Alabama
- Piedmont Boll Weevils, a minor league baseball team

== Music ==
- "Boll Weevil" (song), a traditional blues song and a 1961 hit by Brook Benton
- "Bo Weevil", a 1956 Fats Domino song
- Bo Weavil Jackson, a blues musician
- The Bo-Weevils, a psychedelic rock band
- The Bollweevils, an American punk band
- "Boll Weevil", a song by The Presidents of the United States of America from the 1995 album The Presidents of the United States of America
