= Dorman Weaver =

American politician (died 1971)

Member of the Connecticut House of Representatives from Pomfret
- In office 1959–1967 Serving with James J. Byrnes
- Preceded by: Kermit Howe; Kenneth P. Bosworth
- Succeeded by: Seat eliminated

Personal details
- Born: 1896 or 1897 Newport, Rhode Island, U.S.
- Died: October 24, 1971 (aged 74) Putnam, Connecticut, U.S.
- Party: Republican

Dorman Hubbard Weaver (1896 or 1897 – October 24, 1971) was an American politician who served in the Connecticut House of Representatives from 1959 to 1967, representing the town of Pomfret as a Republican.
