= Weavers (surname) =

Weavers is a surname. Notable people with the surname include:

- Charmaine Weavers (born 1964), South African high jumper
- Diana Weavers (born 1975), New Zealand field hockey player
- Linda Weavers, American environmental engineer

== See also ==
- Weaver (surname)
