= Jim Weaver (sportsperson) =

American sportsperson (1903–1970)

Biographical details
- Born: 1903
- Died: July 11, 1970 (aged 67); Colorado Springs, Colorado, U.S.

Playing career

Football
- c. 1919: Emory & Henry
- c. 1923: Centenary

Basketball
- c. 1920: Emory & Henry

Baseball
- c. 1920: Emory & Henry
- 1923–1924: Centenary

Coaching career (HC unless noted)

Football
- c. 1925: Centenary (freshmen)
- 1928–1932: Oak Ridge Military Academy (NC)
- 1933–1936: Wake Forest

Administrative career (AD unless noted)
- 1937–1954: Wake Forest
- 1954–1970: ACC (commissioner)

Head coaching record
- Overall: 10–23–1 (college)

James H. Weaver (1903 – July 11, 1970) was an American football player, coach, and college athletics administrator. He served as the head football coach at Wake Forest University from 1933 to 1936, compiling a record of 10–23–1. Weaver was athletic director at Wake Forest from 1937 to 1954. As athletic director at Wake Forest, one of his most notable actions was the development of the golf program, including the recruitment and award of a scholarship to Arnold Palmer. On May 7, 1954, he was named commissioner of the Atlantic Coast Conference (ACC). He held the post until his death in 1970.

== Early life and playing career ==
Weaver was a native of Rutherfordton, North Carolina. In 1919 he matriculated at Emory and Henry College, where he played football, basketball, and baseball. His father, Charles C. Weaver, was president of the college. The younger Weaver subsequently attended Trinity College in Durham, North Carolina – now Duke University – before moving on to Centenary College of Louisiana, where he played football.

== Coaching career ==
After graduating from Centenary, Weaver played professional football and coached the freshmen football team as his alma mater. He returned to North Carolina to become the football coach at Oak Ridge Military Academy in 1928, serving in that capacity for five years.

== Death ==
Weaver died at the age of 67 in Colorado Springs, Colorado on July 11, 1970.

== Honors ==
The James Weaver Award, awarded from 1970 to 1994, for the ACC Student-Athlete of the Year (showing exceptional achievement on the playing field and in the classroom), was named after Weaver . In 1994, it merged with other awards, eventually forming the Weaver-James-Corrigan Postgraduate Awards. Weaver was inducted into the North Carolina Sports Hall of Fame in 1971, following his death. He was also among the inaugural class inducted into the Wake Forest athletics hall of fame.

== Head coaching record ==
=== College ===
| Year | Team | Overall | Conference | Standing | Bowl/playoffs |
|---|---|---|---|---|---|
Wake Forest Demon Deacons (Big Five Conference) (1933–1935)
| 1933 | Wake Forest | 0–5–1 | | | |
| 1934 | Wake Forest | 3–7 | | | |
| 1935 | Wake Forest | 2–7 | | | |
Wake Forest Demon Deacons (Southern Conference) (1933–1935)
| 1936 | Wake Forest | 5–4 | 2–3 | 10th | |
| Wake Forest: | | 10–23–1 | | | |
| Total: | | 10–23–1 | | | |
