= 2023 Troy Trojans softball team =

Troy University softball team

2023 Troy Trojans softball
- Conference: Sun Belt Conference
- Record: 33–19–1 (14–9–1 SBC)
- Head coach: Eric Newell (1st season)
- Assistant coaches: Camden Decker; Anna Shelnutt
- Home stadium: Troy Softball Complex

2023 Sun Belt Conference softball standings
| | Conf. | | | | | | Overall |
| Team | W | | L | | T | PCT | W | | L | | T | PCT |
|---|---|---|---|---|---|---|---|---|---|---|---|---|
| Louisiana ‍†‍‡‍^{y} | 22 | – | 2 | – | 0 | .917 | 47 | – | 14 | – | 0 | .770 |
| South Alabama ‍‍‍ | 20 | – | 4 | – | 0 | .833 | 39 | – | 14 | – | 0 | .736 |
| Marshall ‍‍‍ | 17 | – | 5 | – | 0 | .773 | 45 | – | 9 | – | 0 | .833 |
| Troy ‍‍‍ | 14 | – | 9 | – | 1 | .604 | 33 | – | 19 | – | 1 | .632 |
| Texas State ‍‍‍^{y} | 13 | – | 9 | – | 1 | .587 | 34 | – | 23 | – | 1 | .595 |
| James Madison ‍‍‍ | 13 | – | 11 | – | 0 | .542 | 28 | – | 19 | – | 0 | .596 |
| Coastal Carolina ‍‍‍ | 11 | – | 13 | – | 0 | .458 | 36 | – | 20 | – | 0 | .643 |
| Louisiana-Monroe ‍‍‍ | 7 | – | 17 | – | 0 | .292 | 25 | – | 32 | – | 0 | .439 |
| Georgia State ‍‍‍ | 7 | – | 17 | – | 0 | .292 | 18 | – | 36 | – | 0 | .333 |
| Southern Miss ‍‍‍ | 6 | – | 17 | – | 0 | .261 | 22 | – | 24 | – | 0 | .478 |
| Georgia Southern ‍‍‍ | 6 | – | 18 | – | 0 | .250 | 17 | – | 34 | – | 0 | .333 |
| Appalachian State ‍‍‍ | 4 | – | 18 | – | 0 | .182 | 23 | – | 28 | – | 0 | .451 |
† – Conference champion ‡ – Tournament champion y – Invited to the NCAA tournament As of May 28, 2023; Rankings from NFCA/USA Today

The 2023 Troy Trojans softball team represented Troy University during the 2023 NCAA Division I softball season. The Trojans played their home games at Troy Softball Complex. The Trojans were led by first-year head coach Eric Newell after longtime head coach Beth Mullins resigned for health reasons the previous March. Mullins ranked second all-time in wins for the Trojans. They were members of the Sun Belt Conference.

== Preseason ==
=== Sun Belt Conference Coaches Poll ===
The Sun Belt Conference Coaches Poll was released on February 2, 2023. Troy was picked to finish fourth in the conference with 99 votes.

Coaches poll
| Predicted finish | Team | Votes (1st place) |
| 1 | Louisiana | 144 (12) |
| 2 | Texas State | 130 |
| 3 | South Alabama | 118 |
| 4 | Troy | 99 |
| 5 | James Madison | 93 |
| 6 | Marshall | 80 |
| 7 | Southern Miss | 68 |
| 8 | Appalachian State | 63 |
| 9 | Louisiana–Monroe | 44 |
| 10 | Coastal Carolina | 43 |
| 11 | Georgia State; Georgia Southern | 27 |

== Personnel ==
2023 Troy Trojans softball team
Players
Coaches

| # | Pos. | Name | Bats/throws | Height | Year | Home town |
|---|---|---|---|---|---|---|
| 1 | OF | D'Aun Riggs | L/R | 5 ft 5 in (1.65 m) | Jr | Fort Walton Beach, Florida |
| 2 | OF | Anslee Finch | R/R | 5 ft 8 in (1.73 m) | Jr | Geneva, Alabama |
| 3 | RHP | Libby Baker | R/R | 5 ft 8 in (1.73 m) | Jr | Skipperville, Alabama |
| 5 | OF | Emma Grace Walker | L/R | 5 ft 6 in (1.68 m) | So | Kennesaw, Georgia |
| 6 | LHP | Haley Pittman | L/L | 5 ft 7 in (1.7 m) | Jr | Montgomery, Alabama |
| 8 | U | Taylor McKinney | R/R | 5 ft 5 in (1.65 m) | So | Montgomery, Alabama |
| 9 | OF | Jade Sinness | L/L | 5 ft 7 in (1.7 m) | Jr | Sebring, Florida |
| 10 | RHP | Leanna Johnson | R/R | 5 ft 7 in (1.7 m) | Sr | Brantley, Alabama |
| 11 | INF | Audra Thompson | R/R | 5 ft 8 in (1.73 m) | Jr | Kissimmee, Florida |
| 13 | INF | Aayanah Hughes | R/R | 5 ft 3 in (1.6 m) | So | McDonough, Georgia |
| 14 | C | Emma Faulk | R/R | 5 ft 4 in (1.63 m) | Fr | Enterprise, Alabama |
| 17 | C | Katelynn de Leon | R/R | 5 ft 4 in (1.63 m) | Jr | Pembroke Pines, Florida |
| 21 | OF | Jaida McCord | L/R | 5 ft 9 in (1.75 m) | Fr | Dunwoody, Georgia |
| 22 | RHP | Brookelyn Cannon | R/R | 5 ft 4 in (1.63 m) | So | Hoover, Alabama |
| 24 | INF | Kayden Dunn | R/R | 5 ft 9 in (1.75 m) | Fr | Brantley, Alabama |
| 25 | OF | Katie Lively | L/R | 5 ft 6 in (1.68 m) | Sr | Helena, Alabama |
| 29 | INF | Kennedi Gaton | R/R | 5 ft 6 in (1.68 m) | Jr | Winter Springs, Florida |
| 31 | INF | Kelly Horne | R/R | 5 ft 4 in (1.63 m) | Sr | Tallahassee, Florida |
| 34 | RHP | Olivia Cato | R/R | 5 ft 4 in (1.63 m) | Fr | Palmetto, Georgia |
| 44 | INF | Natalie Turner | R/R | 5 ft 3 in (1.6 m) | So | Dothan, Alabama |

Head coach

Eric Newell (William Woods)

Assistant coach(es)

Camden Decker (Trinity International)
Anna Shelnutt (Florida State)

Legend

- (C) Team captain
- (S) Suspended
- (I) Ineligible
- Injured
- Current redshirt

Roster
Last update: 27 March 2024

== Schedule and results ==
Legend
| | Troy win |
| | Troy loss |
| | Postponement/Cancellation/Suspensions |
| **Bold** | Troy team member |

2023 Troy Trojans softball game log
Regular season (33–18–1)

February (10–5)
| Date | Opponent | Rank | Site/stadium | Score | Win | Loss | Save | TV | Attendance | Overall record | SBC record |
Trojan Classic
| Feb. 10 | SIU Edwardsville | | Troy Softball Complex • Troy, AL | **W** 4–0 | **Johnson** (1–0) | King (0–1) | None | ESPN3 | 234 | 1–0 | |
| Feb. 10 | Belmont | | Troy Softball Complex • Troy, AL | **L** 2–6 | Johnson (1–0) | **Pittman** (0–1) | None | ESPN3 | 211 | 1–1 | |
| Feb. 12 | SIU Edwardsville | | Troy Softball Complex • Troy, AL | **W** 2–1 | **Johnson** (2–0) | Baalman (0–1) | None | ESPN3 | 135 | 2–1 | |
| Feb. 12 | Belmont | | Troy Softball Complex • Troy, AL | **L** 2–4^{8} | Johnson (3–0) | **Johnson** (2–1) | None | ESPN3 | 304 | 2–2 | |
Troy Invitational
| Feb. 17 | Kennesaw State | | Troy Softball Complex • Troy, AL | **W** 6–1 | **Baker** (1–0) | Bennett (1-1) | None | ESPN3 | 53 | 3–2 | |
| Feb. 17 | Murray State | | Troy Softball Complex • Troy, AL | **W** 4–2 | **Johnson** (3–1) | Veber (2-2) | None | ESPN3 | 78 | 4–2 | |
| Feb. 18 | Murray State | | Troy Softball Complex • Troy, AL | **W** 6–0 | **Cato** (1–0) | James (1–3) | None | | 187 | 5–2 | |
| Feb. 18 | Kennesaw State | | Troy Softball Complex • Troy, AL | **W** 7–2 | **Johnson** (4–1) | Hilleary (0–1) | None | | 218 | 6–2 | |
| Feb. 19 | Kennesaw State | | Troy Softball Complex • Troy, AL | **L** 0–1 | Bennett (1-1) | **Cato** (1-1) | None | ESPN3 | 204 | 6–3 | |
| Feb. 22 | at Mercer | | Sikes Field • Macon, GA | **W** 8–3 | **Johnson** (5–1) | Taylor (1–2) | None | ESPN+ | 112 | 7–3 | |
Unconquered Invitational
| Feb. 24 | vs. Florida Gulf Coast | | JoAnne Graf Field at the Seminole Softball Complex • Tallahassee, FL | **W** 5–4 | **Johnson** (6–1) | Maulding (3–1) | None | | 126 | 8–3 | |
| Feb. 24 | vs. Lamar | | JoAnne Graf Field at the Seminole Softball Complex • Tallahassee, FL | **W** 8–0^{5} | **Cato** (2–1) | Ruiz (0–5) | None | | 126 | 9–3 | |
| Feb. 25 | vs. Florida Gulf Coast | | JoAnne Graf Field at the Seminole Softball Complex • Tallahassee, FL | **L** 1–6 | Haggard (2-2) | **Baker** (1-1) | None | | | 9–4 | |
| Feb. 25 | at No. 6 Florida State | | JoAnne Graf Field at the Seminole Softball Complex • Tallahassee, FL | **L** 1–2 | Sandercock (4–2) | **Cato** (2-2) | None | ACCNX | 1,351 | 9–5 | |
| Feb. 26 | vs. Lamar | | JoAnne Graf Field at the Seminole Softball Complex • Tallahassee, FL | **W** 2–0 | **Johnson** (7–1) | Mitchell (2–7) | None | | | 10–5 | |

March (14–4–1)
| Date | Opponent | Rank | Site/stadium | Score | Win | Loss | Save | TV | Attendance | Overall record | SBC record |
|---|---|---|---|---|---|---|---|---|---|---|---|
| Mar. 1 | No. 19 Auburn | | Troy Softball Complex • Troy, AL | **L** 0–11 | Penta (9–0) | **Johnson** (7–2) | None | ESPN+ | 1,822 | 10–6 | |
JU/UNF Spring Break Challenge
| Mar. 3 | vs. Jacksonville | | UNF Softball Complex • Jacksonville, FL | **W** 12–4^{5} | **Johnson** (8–2) | Harwood (4–3) | None | | 112 | 11–6 | |
| Mar. 3 | vs. Jacksonville | | UNF Softball Complex • Jacksonville, FL | **W** 9–0^{5} | **Cato** (3–2) | Whitfield (4–5) | None | | 210 | 12–6 | |
| Mar. 4 | at North Florida | | UNF Softball Complex • Jacksonville, FL | **W** 12–1 | **Johnson** (9–2) | Connor (2–3) | None | | 74 | 13–6 | |
| Mar. 4 | at North Florida | | UNF Softball Complex • Jacksonville, FL | **L** 6–8 | Kelly (7–1) | **Cato** (1–2) | Connor (2) | | 74 | 13–7 | |
| Mar. 5 | vs. Charleston Southern | | UNF Softball Complex • Jacksonville, FL | **W** 6–3 | **Johnson** (10–2) | Lauffer (1–7) | **Cato** (1) | | 59 | 14–7 | |
| Mar. 8 | at Alabama State | | Barbara Williams Softball Complex • Montgomery, AL | **W** 5–2 | **Johnson** (11–2) | Myers (0–2) | None | | 80 | 15–7 | |
Spring Break Challenge
| Mar. 10 | vs. Army | | UNF Softball Complex • Jacksonville, FL | **W** 7–1 | **Johnson** (12–2) | Eaglin (1–2) | **Pittman** (1) | | | 16–7 | |
| Mar. 11 | vs. Army | | UNF Softball Complex • Jacksonville, FL | **W** 8–0^{5} | **Johnson** (13–2) | Farris (2–8) | None | | | 17–7 | |
| Mar. 11 | vs. Northern Kentucky | | UNF Softball Complex • Jacksonville, FL | **W** 9–2 | **Johnson** (14–2) | Flores (2–6) | None | | | 18–7 | |
| Mar. 12 | at North Florida | | UNF Softball Complex • Jacksonville, FL | **W** 5–0 | **Johnson** (15–2) | Connor (5–4) | None | | 209 | 19–7 | |
| Mar. 18 | Texas State | | Troy Softball Complex • Troy, AL | **W** 7–6 | **Johnson** (16–2) | Mullins (11–6) | None | ESPN+ | 243 | 20–7 | 1–0 |
| Mar. 18 | Texas State | | Troy Softball Complex • Troy, AL | **W** 6–3 | **Cannon** (1–0) | Welsh (0–1) | **Johnson** (2) | ESPN+ | 356 | 21–7 | 2–0 |
| Mar. 19 | Texas State | | Troy Softball Complex • Troy, AL | **T** 2–2 | | | | ESPN+ | 373 | 21–7–1 | 2–0–1 |
| Mar. 22 | Georgia Tech | | Troy Softball Complex • Troy, AL | **L** 0–6 | Dennis (10–4) | **Cato** (3–4) | None | ESPN+ | 299 | 21–8–1 | |
| Mar. 24 | at Louisiana–Monroe | | Geo-Surfaces Field at the ULM Softball Complex • Monroe, LA | **L** 0–2 | Abrams (4–3) | **Johnson** (16–3) | None | ESPN+ | 367 | 21–9–1 | 2–1–1 |
| Mar. 25 | at Louisiana–Monroe | | Geo-Surfaces Field at the ULM Softball Complex • Monroe, LA | **W** 7–2 | **Cato** (4-4) | Hulett (7–4) | None | ESPN+ | 652 | 22–9–1 | 3–1–1 |
| Mar. 26 | at Louisiana–Monroe | | Geo-Surfaces Field at the ULM Softball Complex • Monroe, LA | **W** 9–2 | **Johnson** (17–3) | Abrams (4-4) | None | ESPN+ | 615 | 23–9–1 | 4–1–1 |
| Mar. 31 | at Southern Miss | | Southern Miss Softball Complex • Hattiesburg, MS | **W** 5–1 | **Johnson** (18–3) | Leinstock (8–10) | None | ESPN+ | | 24–9–1 | 5–1–1 |

April (9–6)
| Date | Opponent | Rank | Site/stadium | Score | Win | Loss | Save | TV | Attendance | Overall record | SBC record |
|---|---|---|---|---|---|---|---|---|---|---|---|
| Apr. 1 | at Southern Miss | | Southern Miss Softball Complex • Hattiesburg, MS | **W** 3–0 | **Cato** (5–4) | Kilgore (4–1) | **Johnson** (2) | ESPN+ | | 25–9–1 | 6–1–1 |
| Apr. 2 | at Southern Miss | | Southern Miss Softball Complex • Hattiesburg, MS | **W** 11–3^{5} | **Johnson** (19–3) | Lee (3–4) | None | ESPN+ | | 26–9–1 | 7–1–1 |
| Apr. 6 | Coastal Carolina | | Troy Softball Complex • Troy, AL | **W** 9–0^{6} | **Johnson** (20–3) | Brabham (10–5) | None | ESPN+ | 258 | 27–9–1 | 8–1–1 |
| Apr. 6 | Coastal Carolina | | Troy Softball Complex • Troy, AL | **W** 8–7 | **Johnson** (21–3) | Brabham (10–6) | None | ESPN+ | 432 | 28–9–1 | 9–1–1 |
| Apr. 7 | Coastal Carolina | | Troy Softball Complex • Troy, AL | **L** 0–4 | Volpe (8–1) | **Johnson** (21–4) | None | ESPN+ | 272 | 28–10–1 | 9–2–1 |
| Apr. 12 | at No. 21 Auburn | | Jane B. Moore Field • Auburn, AL | **L** 5–7 | Penta (18–5) | **Cato** (5-5) | Lowe (1) | SECN+ | 1,696 | 28–11–1 | |
| Apr. 14 | at James Madison | | Eagle Field at Veterans Memorial Park • Harrisonburg, VA | **W** 9–8 | **Johnson** (22–4) | Humphrey (8-8) | **Cato** (2) | ESPN+ | 231 | 29–11–1 | 10–2–1 |
| Apr. 15 | at James Madison | | Eagle Field at Veterans Memorial Park • Harrisonburg, VA | **L** 0–4 | Rogers (2-2) | **Cato** (5–6) | None | ESPN+ | 415 | 29–12–1 | 10–3–1 |
| Apr. 16 | at James Madison | | Eagle Field at Veterans Memorial Park • Hattiesburg, VA | **L** 7–10 | Berry (9–2) | **Johnson** (22–5) | None | ESPN+ | 525 | 29–13–1 | 10–4–1 |
| Apr. 21 | Louisiana | | Troy Softball Complex • Troy, AL | **W** 8–7 | **Baker** (2–1) | Schorman (12–6) | None | ESPN+ | 462 | 30–13–1 | 11–4–1 |
| Apr. 22 | Louisiana | | Troy Softball Complex • Troy, AL | **L** 2–9 | Schorman (13–6) | **Johnson** (22–6) | None | ESPN+ | 698 | 30–14–1 | 11–5–1 |
| Apr. 23 | Louisiana | | Troy Softball Complex • Troy, AL | **L** 1–6 | Landry (13–4) | **Baker** (2-2) | None | ESPN+ | 429 | 30–15–1 | 11–6–1 |
| Apr. 28 | Georgia Southern | | Troy Softball Complex • Troy, AL | **W** 3–0 | **Johnson** (23–6) | Barnard (1–8) | None | ESPN+ | 431 | 31–15–1 | 12–6–1 |
| Apr. 29 | Georgia Southern | | Troy Softball Complex • Troy, AL | **W** 11–3 | **Pittman** (1-1) | Belogorska (1–2) | None | ESPN+ | 245 | 32–15–1 | 13–6–1 |
| Apr. 30 | Georgia Southern | | Troy Softball Complex • Troy, AL | **W** 8–0 | **Johnson** (24–6) | Barnard (1–9) | None | ESPN+ | 673 | 33–15–1 | 14–6–1 |

May (0–3)
| Date | Opponent | Rank | Site/stadium | Score | Win | Loss | Save | TV | Attendance | Overall record | SBC record |
|---|---|---|---|---|---|---|---|---|---|---|---|
| May 4 | at South Alabama | | Jaguar Field • Mobile, AL | **L** 1–6 | Lackie (20–6) | **Johnson** (24–7) | None | ESPN+ | 444 | 33–16–1 | 14–7–1 |
| May 6 | at South Alabama | | Jaguar Field • Mobile, AL | **L** 0–6 | Hardy (16–7) | **Baker** (2–3) | None | ESPN+ | 503 | 33–17–1 | 14–8–1 |
| May 6 | at South Alabama | | Jaguar Field • Mobile, AL | **L** 6–7 | Hardy (17–7) | **Johnson** (24–8) | None | ESPN+ | 503 | 33–18–1 | 14–9–1 |

Post-Season (0–1)

SBC tournament (0–1)
| Date | Opponent | (Seed)/Rank | Site/stadium | Score | Win | Loss | Save | TV | Attendance | Overall record | Tournament record |
|---|---|---|---|---|---|---|---|---|---|---|---|
| May 11 | vs. (5) Texas State | (4) | Yvette Girouard Field at Lamson Park • Lafayette, LA | **L** 0–3 | Mullins (21–10) | **Johnson** (24–9) | None | ESPN+ | | 33–19–1 | 0–1 |

Schedule source:

*Rankings are based on the team's current ranking in the NFCA/USA Softball poll.
