= 2023 Texas State Bobcats softball team =

2023 Texas State Bobcats softball
- Conference: Sun Belt Conference
- Record: 35–25–1 (13–9–1 SBC)
- Head coach: Ricci Woodard (23rd season)
- Assistant coaches: Scott Woodard; Josh Trevino
- Home stadium: Bobcat Softball Stadium

2023 Sun Belt Conference softball standings
	Conf.						Overall
Team	W		L		T	PCT	W		L		T	PCT
Louisiana ‍†‍‡‍^{y}	22	–	2	–	0	.917	47	–	14	–	0	.770
South Alabama ‍‍‍	20	–	4	–	0	.833	39	–	14	–	0	.736
Marshall ‍‍‍	17	–	5	–	0	.773	45	–	9	–	0	.833
Troy ‍‍‍	14	–	9	–	1	.604	33	–	19	–	1	.632
Texas State ‍‍‍^{y}	13	–	9	–	1	.587	34	–	23	–	1	.595
James Madison ‍‍‍	13	–	11	–	0	.542	28	–	19	–	0	.596
Coastal Carolina ‍‍‍	11	–	13	–	0	.458	36	–	20	–	0	.643
Louisiana-Monroe ‍‍‍	7	–	17	–	0	.292	25	–	32	–	0	.439
Georgia State ‍‍‍	7	–	17	–	0	.292	18	–	36	–	0	.333
Southern Miss ‍‍‍	6	–	17	–	0	.261	22	–	24	–	0	.478
Georgia Southern ‍‍‍	6	–	18	–	0	.250	17	–	34	–	0	.333
Appalachian State ‍‍‍	4	–	18	–	0	.182	23	–	28	–	0	.451
† – Conference champion ‡ – Tournament champion y – Invited to the NCAA tournament As of May 28, 2023; Rankings from NFCA/USA Today

The 2023 Texas State Bobcats softball team represented Texas State University during the 2023 NCAA Division I softball season. The Bobcats played their home games at Bobcat Softball Stadium. The Bobcats were led by twenty-third year head coach Ricci Woodard and were members of the Sun Belt Conference.

== Preseason ==
=== Sun Belt Conference Coaches Poll ===
The Sun Belt Conference Coaches Poll was released on February 2, 2023. Texas State was picked to finish second in the conference with 130 votes.

Coaches poll
Predicted finish	Team	Votes (1st place)
1	Louisiana	144 (12)
2	Texas State	130
3	South Alabama	118
4	Troy	99
5	James Madison	93
6	Marshall	80
7	Southern Miss	68
8	Appalachian State	63
9	Louisiana–Monroe	44
10	Coastal Carolina	43
11	Georgia State; Georgia Southern	27

=== Preseason All-Sun Belt team ===
- Jessica Mullins (Pitcher, TXST)
- Olivia Lackie (Pitcher, USA)
- Sophie Piskos (Pitcher, LA)
- Hannah Shifflett (1st Base, JMU)
- Stormy Kotzelnick (1st Base, LA)
- Kelly Horne (2nd Base, TXST)
- Alexa Langeliers (Shortstop, LA)
- Jourdyn Campbell (3rd Base, LA)
- Sara Vanderford (3rd Base, TXST)
- Karly Heath (Designated Player, LA)
- Iyanla De Jesus (Designated Player, CCU)
- Ciara Trahan (Outfielder, TXST)
- Maddie Hayden (Outfielder, LA)
- Mackenzie Brasher (Outfielder, USA)
- Kayt Houston (Outfielder, APP)

== Personnel ==
2023 Texas State Bobcats softball team
Players
Coaches

#	Pos.	Name	Bats/throws	Height	Year	Home town
0	C	Megan Kelnar	R/R	5 ft 6 in (1.68 m)	Fr	Kyle, Texas
1	OF	Emilee Baker	L/R	5 ft 3 in (1.6 m)	Fr	Thorndale, Texas
3	U	Hannah Earls	L/R	5 ft 5 in (1.65 m)	Jr	Willis, Texas
4	RHP	Jessica Mullins	L/R	5 ft 8 in (1.73 m)	Jr	Tarkington, Texas
5	U	Kamden Hutton	R/R	5 ft 6 in (1.68 m)	Fr	Poolville, Texas
6	OF	Ciara Trahan	L/R	5 ft 4 in (1.63 m)	So	Santa Fe, Texas
8	INF	Claire Ginder	R/R	5 ft 8 in (1.73 m)	Jr	Lithia, Florida
9	U	Sydney Harvey	L/R	5 ft 5 in (1.65 m)	Fr	Victoria, Texas
10	C	Karmyn Bass	R/R	5 ft 6 in (1.68 m)	Fr	Crandall, Texas
11	OF	Piper Randolph	L/R	5 ft 6 in (1.68 m)	Jr	Salado, Texas
13	INF	Braylin Pannill	R/R	5 ft 7 in (1.7 m)	Fr	Georgetown, Texas
14	U	Anna Jones	L/R	5 ft 5 in (1.65 m)	Jr	Deer Park, Texas
15	RHP	Tori McCann	R/R	5 ft 6 in (1.68 m)	Sr	Round Rock, Texas
16	RHP	Karsen Pierce	R/R	5 ft 8 in (1.73 m)	Jr	Daphne, Alabama
18	U	Bailee Welsh	L/L	5 ft 4 in (1.63 m)	So	Fairhope, Alabama
19	C	Makayla Hall (redshirt)	R/R	5 ft 9 in (1.75 m)	Fr	Spring, Texas
21	RHP	Presley Glende	R/R	5 ft 8 in (1.73 m)	So	Kirbyville, Texas
23	RHP	Analisa Soliz	R/R	5 ft 8 in (1.73 m)	Fr	Cibolo, Texas
25	U	JJ Smith	L/R	5 ft 10 in (1.78 m)	Jr	Rosenberg, Texas
26	INF	Sara Vanderford	R/R	5 ft 6 in (1.68 m)	Sr	Pasadena, Texas
28	U	Katarina Zarate	R/R	5 ft 9 in (1.75 m)	Fr	Victoria, Texas

Head coach

Ricci Woodard (New Mexico State)

Assistant coach(es)

Scott Woodard (Western New Mexico)
Josh Trevino (Texas State)

Legend

- (C) Team captain
- (S) Suspended
- (I) Ineligible
- Injured
- Current redshirt

Roster
Last update: 28 March 2024

== Schedule and results ==
Legend
	Texas State win
	Texas State loss
	Postponement/Cancellation/Suspensions
**Bold**	Texas State team member

2023 Texas State Bobcats softball game log
Regular season (33–22–1)

February (12–4)
Date	Opponent	Rank	Site/stadium	Score	Win	Loss	Save	TV	Attendance	Overall record	SBC record
Texas State Tournament
Feb. 10	Wichita State		Bobcat Softball Stadium • San Marcos, TX	**L** 2–3	Cooper (1–0)	**Mullins** (0–1)	None	ESPN+	576	0–1	
Feb. 10	Kent State		Bobcat Softball Stadium • San Marcos, TX	**W** 8–0^{5}	**Pierce** (1–0)	Bowers (0–1)	None	ESPN+	576	1–1	
Feb. 11	Kent State		Bobcat Softball Stadium • San Marcos, TX	**W** 5–1	**Mullins** (1-1)	Kelly (0–1)	**Glende** (1)	ESPN+	585	2–1	
Feb. 11	Villanova		Bobcat Softball Stadium • San Marcos, TX	**L** 2–4	Gallant (1–0)	**McCann** (0–1)	None	ESPN+	585	2–2	
Feb. 12	Wichita State		Bobcat Softball Stadium • San Marcos, TX	**W** 7–4	**Mullins** (2–1)	Howell (1-1)	None	ESPN+	544	3–2	
I-35 Tourney
Feb. 16	Lamar		Bobcat Softball Stadium • San Marcos, TX	**W** 9–0^{5}	**McCann** (1-1)	Mitchell (0–3)	None	ESPN+	361	4–2	
Feb. 17	South Dakota State		Bobcat Softball Stadium • San Marcos, TX	**L** 0–2	Kniesche (4–0)	**Mullins** (2-2)	None	ESPN+	453	4–3	
Feb. 18	South Dakota State		Bobcat Softball Stadium • San Marcos, TX	**W** 3–1	**Pierce** (2–0)	Lasey (3–1)	None	ESPN+	517	5–3	
Feb. 19	South Dakota State		Bobcat Softball Stadium • San Marcos, TX	**W** 9–1^{5}	**McCann** (2–1)	Williams (0–2)	None	ESPN+	405	6–3	
Feb. 19	New Mexico State		Bobcat Softball Stadium • San Marcos, TX	**W** 0–4	Brown (1-1)	**Mullins** (2–3)	Dix (1)	ESPN+	405	6–4	
TXST Classic
Feb. 23	UTSA		Bobcat Softball Stadium • San Marcos, TX	**W** 1–0	**McCann** (3–1)	Estell (2-2)	None	ESPN+	513	7–4	
Feb. 23	UT Arlington		Bobcat Softball Stadium • San Marcos, TX	**W** 4–3^{9}	**Mullins** (3-3)	Bumpurs (1–2)	None	ESPN+	513	8–4	
Feb. 24	Kansas		Bobcat Softball Stadium • San Marcos, TX	**W** 2–1	**Mullins** (4–3)	Ludwig (2–1)	None	ESPN+	596	9–4	
Feb. 24	Colorado State		Bobcat Softball Stadium • San Marcos, TX	**W** 4–1	**McCann** (4–1)	Hornbuckle (3-3)	None	ESPN+	596	10–4	
Feb. 25	UT Arlington		Bobcat Softball Stadium • San Marcos, TX	**W** 6–5^{8}	**Mullins** (5–3)	Adams (3–5)	None	ESPN+	705	11–4	
Feb. 26	Colorado State		Bobcat Softball Stadium • San Marcos, TX	**W** 4–3	**Mullins** (6–3)	Serna (9–6)	None	ESPN+	572	12–4	

March (9–10–1)
Date	Opponent	Rank	Site/stadium	Score	Win	Loss	Save	TV	Attendance	Overall record	SBC record
Owl Classic
Mar. 2	vs. Winthrop		FAU Softball Stadium • Boca Raton, FL	**L** 4–8	Smith (1–0)	**McCann** (4–2)	None	ESPN+	52	12–5	
Mar. 2	at Florida Atlantic		FAU Softball Stadium • Boca Raton, FL	**W** 2–0	**Mullins** (7–3)	Gardner (2–3)	None	ESPN+		13–5	
Mar. 3	vs. Penn		FAU Softball Stadium • Boca Raton, FL	**W** 9–0^{5}	**Pierce** (3–0)	Fiorentino (0–3)	None	ESPN+	78	14–5	
Mar. 3	vs. Illinois State		FAU Softball Stadium • Boca Raton, FL	**W** 3–1	**Mullins** (8–3)	Meshnick (1–4)	None	ESPN+		15–5	
Mar. 4	vs. Winthrop		FAU Softball Stadium • Boca Raton, FL	**W** 5–0	**Mullins** (8–3)	Basinger (6–4)	None	ESPN+		16–5	
Bevo Classic
Mar. 10	vs. Wisconsin		Red and Charline McCombs Field • Austin, TX	**L** 2–4^{9}	Salo (4–0)	**Mullins** (9–4)	Schwartz (1)	ESPN+		16–6	
Mar. 10	vs. Wisconsin		Red and Charline McCombs Field • Austin, TX	**L** 3–4	Magnanimo (1-1)	**Pierce** (3–1)	Schwartz (2)	ESPN+		16–7	
Mar. 11	vs. No. 13 Alabama		Red and Charline McCombs Field • Austin, TX	**W** 3–1	**Mullins** (10–4)	Harvey (3–1)	None	LHN		17–7	
Mar. 12	at No. 9 Texas		Red and Charline McCombs Field • Austin, TX	**W** 5–4^{9}	**Mullins** (11–4)	Simpson (2–1)	None	LHN	1,782	18–7	
Mar. 14	Texas Tech		Bobcat Softball Stadium • San Marcos, TX	**L** 3–4	Fritz (6–1)	**Mullins** (11–5)	Hoover (1)	ESPN+	1,005	18–8	
Mar. 14	Texas Tech		Bobcat Softball Stadium • San Marcos, TX	**L** 2–3	Carlin (1–2)	**Pierce** (3–2)	Herzog (2)	ESPN+	1,005	18–9	
Mar. 18	at Troy		Trojan Softball Complex • Troy, AL	**L** 6–7	Johnson (16–2)	**Mullins** (11–6)	None	ESPN+	243	18–10	0–1
Mar. 18	at Troy		Trojan Softball Complex • Troy, AL	**L** 3–6	Brookelyn (1–0)	**Welsh** (0–1)	Johnson (2)	ESPN+	356	18–11	0–2
Mar. 19	at Troy		Trojan Softball Complex • Troy, AL	**L** 2–2				ESPN+	373	18–11–1	0–2–1
Mar. 22	at UTSA		Roadrunner Field • San Antonio, TX	**W** 15–0^{5}	**Mullins** (12–6)	Estell (2–6)	None	ESPN+	292	19–11–1	
Mar. 24	South Alabama		Bobcat Softball Stadium • San Marcos, TX	**L** 1–2	Lackie (10–4)	**Mullins** (11–7)	None	ESPN+	417	19–12–1	0–3–1
Mar. 25	South Alabama		Bobcat Softball Stadium • San Marcos, TX	**W** 6–2	**Pierce** (4–2)	Hardy (10–6)	None	ESPN+	536	20–12–1	1–3–1
Mar. 26	South Alabama		Bobcat Softball Stadium • San Marcos, TX	**L** 0–7	Lackie (11–4)	**McCann** (4–3)	None	ESPN+	547	20–13–1	1–4–1
Mar. 29	No. 21 Baylor		Bobcat Softball Stadium • San Marcos, TX	**L** 2–3	Crandall (8–4)	**McCann** (4-4)	None	ESPN+	566	20–14–1	
Mar. 31	at Appalachian State		Sywassink/Lloyd Family Stadium • Boone, NC	**W** 4–3	**Pierce** (5–2)	Neas (6–3)	None	ESPN+	133	21–14–1	2–4–1

April (10–7)
Date	Opponent	Rank	Site/stadium	Score	Win	Loss	Save	TV	Attendance	Overall record	SBC record
Apr. 1	at Appalachian State		Sywassink/Lloyd Family Stadium • Boone, NC	**W** 3–1	**McCann** (5–4)	Buckner (4-4)	None	ESPN+	271	22–14–1	3–4–1
Apr. 2	at Appalachian State		Sywassink/Lloyd Family Stadium • Boone, NC	**W** 7–2	**Mullins** (13–7)	Northrop (7–4)	None	ESPN+	214	23–14–1	4–4–1
Apr. 6	Southern Miss		Bobcat Softball Stadium • San Marcos, TX	Game cancelled							
Apr. 8	Southern Miss		Bobcat Softball Stadium • San Marcos, TX	**W** 4–3	**McCann** (6–4)	Leinstock (8–11)	None	ESPN+	518	24–14–1	5–4–1
Apr. 8	Southern Miss		Bobcat Softball Stadium • San Marcos, TX	**W** 4–2	**Pierce** (5–2)	Kilgore (4–2)	**Mullins** (1)	ESPN+	518	25–14–1	6–4–1
Apr. 11	Sam Houston		Bobcat Softball Stadium • San Marcos, TX	**W** 4–2^{8}	**Mullins** (14–7)	Grams (6–4)	None	ESPN+	406	26–14–1	
Apr. 12	No. 8 Texas		Bobcat Softball Stadium • San Marcos, TX	**L** 0–4	Morgan (12–2)	**McCann** (6–5)	None	ESPN+	1,027	26–15–1	
Apr. 14	at Louisiana		Yvette Girouard Field at Lamson Park • Lafayette, LA	**L** 3–5	Schorman (12–5)	**Mullins** (14–8)	Lamb (3)	ESPN+	1,651	26–16–1	6–5–1
Apr. 15	at Louisiana		Yvette Girouard Field at Lamson Park • Lafayette, LA	**L** 2–4	Lamb (5–1)	**McCann** (6-6)	None	ESPN+	1,753	26–17–1	6–6–1
Apr. 16	at Louisiana		Yvette Girouard Field at Lamson Park • Lafayette, LA	**L** 0–7	Landry (12–4)	**Pierce** (5–3)	None	ESPN+	1,602	26–18–1	6–7–1
Apr. 19	at No. 25 Texas A&M		Davis Diamond • College Station, TX	**L** 0–8^{6}	Ackerman (6-6)	**McCann** (6–7)	None	ESPN+	1,186	26–19–1	
Apr. 21	Louisiana–Monroe		Bobcat Softball Stadium • San Marcos, TX	**W** 3–2	**Mullins** (15–8)	Chavarria (6–7)	None	ESPN+	482	27–19–1	7–7–1
Apr. 22	Louisiana–Monroe		Bobcat Softball Stadium • San Marcos, TX	**W** 5–1	**McCann** (7-7)	Abrams (4–11)	None	ESPN+	643	28–19–1	8–7–1
Apr. 22	Louisiana–Monroe		Bobcat Softball Stadium • San Marcos, TX	**W** 3–1	**Mullins** (16–8)	Chavarria (6–8)	None	ESPN+	643	29–19–1	9–7–1
Apr. 26	at No. 18 Baylor		Getterman Stadium • Waco, TX	**L** 0–3^{6}	West (7–2)	**Mullins** (16–9)	None	ESPN+	670	29–20–1	
Apr. 28	at Marshall		Dot Hicks Field • Huntington, WV	**W** 3–0	**Mullins** (17–9)	Nester (23–6)	None	ESPN+	293	30–20–1	10–7–1
Apr. 29	at Marshall		Dot Hicks Field • Huntington, WV	**L** 1–2	Rice (11–0)	**Glende** (1-1)	Nester (3)	ESPN+	479	30–21–1	10–8–1
Apr. 30	at Marshall		Dot Hicks Field • Huntington, WV	**W** 9–1^{6}	**Mullins** (19–9)	Nester (23–8)	None	ESPN+	393	31–21–1	11–8–1

May (2–1)
Date	Opponent	Rank	Site/stadium	Score	Win	Loss	Save	TV	Attendance	Overall record	SBC record
May 4	James Madison		Bobcat Softball Stadium • San Marcos, TX	**W** 2–0	**Mullins** (20–9)	Berry (10–4)	None	ESPN+	487	32–21–1	12–8–1
May 5	James Madison		Bobcat Softball Stadium • San Marcos, TX	**W** 8–2	**Mullins** (21–9)	Berry (10–5)	None	ESPN+	502	33–21–1	13–8–1
May 6	James Madison		Bobcat Softball Stadium • San Marcos, TX	**L** 1–3	Berry (11–5)	**Mullins** (21–10)	None	ESPN+	448	33–22–1	13–9–1

Post-Season (2–3)

SBC tournament (1–1)
Date	Opponent	(Seed)/Rank	Site/stadium	Score	Win	Loss	Save	TV	Attendance	Overall record	Tournament record
May 11	vs. (4) Troy	(5)	Yvette Girouard Field at Lamson Park • Lafayette, LA	**W** 3–0	**Mullins** (22–10)	Johnson (24–9)	None	ESPN+		34–22–1	1–0
May 12	vs. (1) Louisiana		Yvette Girouard Field at Lamson Park • Lafayette, LA	**L** 1–4	Lamb (9–1)	**Mullins** (22–11)	None	ESPN+	1,458	34–23–1	1–1

NCAA Division I softball tournament (1–2)
Date	Opponent	(Seed)/Rank	Site/stadium	Score	Win	Loss	Save	TV	Attendance	Overall record	Tournament record
Austin Regionals
May 19	vs. (2) Texas A&M	(3)	Red and Charline McCombs Field • Austin, TX	**L** 1–2^{8}	Kennedy (12–5)	**Mullins** (22–12)	None	LHN	1,655	34–24–1	0–1
May 20	vs. (4) Seton Hall	(3)	Red and Charline McCombs Field • Austin, TX	**W** 4–3	**Mullins** (23–12)	Carr (11–5)	**McCann** (1)	ESPN+	1,585	35–24–1	1–1
May 20	vs. (2) Texas A&M	(3)	Red and Charline McCombs Field • Austin, TX	**L** 2–4	Leavitt (11–6)	**McCann** (7–8)	Kennedy (3)	ESPN+	1,579	35–25–1	1–2

Schedule source:

*Rankings are based on the team's current ranking in the NFCA/USA Softball poll.

== Austin Regional ==
Austin Regional Teams
(1) Texas Longhorns	(2) Texas A&M Aggies	(3) Texas State Bobcats	(4) Seton Hall Pirates

First Round
13	Texas	8^{(5)}
Seton Hall	0
Texas A&M	2^{8}
Texas State	1
Lower round 1
Seton Hall	3
Texas State	4

Semi-Finals
13	Texas	2
Texas A&M	1
Lower final
Texas A&M	4
Texas State	2

Finals
13	Texas	11	–
Texas A&M	5	–
