= 2023 NCAA Division I softball season =

College softball in the United States

- Duration: February 11 – June 8, 2023
- Number of teams: 286
- Defending Champions: Oklahoma
- TV partner/s: ESPN & ESPN+

NCAA Tournament
- Duration: May 19 – June 8
- Most conference bids: SEC, 12 bids

Women's College World Series
- Duration: June 1 – June 8
- Champions: Oklahoma (7th title)
- Runners-up: Florida State (12th WCWS Appearance)
- Winning Coach: Patty Gasso (7th title)
- WCWS MOP: Jordy Bahl

Seasons
- ← 2022 2024 →

The 2023 NCAA Division I softball season, play of college softball in the United States organized by the National Collegiate Athletic Association (NCAA) at the Division I level, began in February 2023. The season progressed through the regular season, many conference tournaments and championship series, and concluded with the 2023 NCAA Division I softball tournament and 2023 Women's College World Series. The Women's College World Series, consisting of the eight remaining teams in the NCAA tournament and held annually in Oklahoma City at USA Softball Hall of Fame Stadium, ended in June 2023.

== Realignment ==
Five schools began transitions from NCAA Division II to Division I on July 1, 2022.

- Lindenwood and Southern Indiana joined the Ohio Valley Conference (OVC).
- Queens joined the ASUN Conference (which has since reverted to its past name of Atlantic Sun Conference).
- Stonehill joined the Northeast Conference (NEC).
- Texas A&M–Commerce joined the Southland Conference (SLC).

A total of 17 softball-sponsoring schools changed conferences after the 2022 season.

- Austin Peay, Belmont, and Murray State left the Ohio Valley Conference. Peay joined the ASUN, and Belmont and Murray State joined the Missouri Valley Conference (MVC).
- Bryant and Mount St. Mary's left the NEC, respectively for the America East Conference and Metro Atlantic Athletic Conference (MAAC).
- Hampton, Monmouth, North Carolina A&T, and Stony Brook joined the Colonial Athletic Association (CAA; since renamed the Coastal Athletic Association). Hampton and A&T left the Big South Conference (the latter after only one season), Monmouth the MAAC, and Stony Brook the America East.
- Hartford, which began a transition to NCAA Division III in the 2021–22 school year, left the America East to become an independent for 2022–23 before joining the D-III Commonwealth Coast Conference in 2023.
- James Madison, Marshall, Old Dominion, and Southern Miss joined the Sun Belt Conference (SBC). James Madison left the CAA, while the others left Conference USA (CUSA).
- Lamar, which had announced it would leave the WAC to return to its former home of the SLC in 2023–24, expedited this move to 2022–23.
- UIC left the Horizon League for the MVC.
- UT Arlington left the SBC for the WAC.

Incarnate Word had announced plans to leave the SLC for the WAC after the 2022 season, but days before that move was to take effect, the school announced it was staying in the SLC.

The 2023 season was the last for 14 softball schools in their current conferences, as well as the aforementioned Hartford's only season as a D-I independent.

- BYU, Houston, and UCF moved to the Big 12 Conference. BYU left the West Coast Conference, while the others left the American Athletic Conference (The American).
- Campbell left the Big South for the CAA.
- Charlotte, Florida Atlantic, North Texas, UAB, and UTSA left CUSA for The American.
- Jacksonville State, Liberty, New Mexico State, and Sam Houston joined CUSA. Jacksonville State and Liberty left the ASUN, and New Mexico State and Sam Houston the WAC.
- Western Illinois left the Summit League for the Ohio Valley Conference.

== Other changes from 2022 ==
Two Division I members, both sponsoring softball, adopted new names after the 2022 season. Neither school's nickname was affected.

- Dixie State University changed its forward-facing name to Utah Tech University in May 2022, ahead of the legal name change on July 1. The nickname remains Trailblazers.
- Houston Baptist University became Houston Christian University on September 21, 2022. The nickname remains Huskies.

== Other headlines ==
- On December 29, 2022, the Big West Conference announced it would add a softball tournament effective as early as the 2025 season. The 2025 start date was later confirmed by a vote of the conference chancellors and presidents, with an official announcement in October 2023.

== Season outlook ==
USA Today/NFCA DI Coaches Poll
Ranking	Team
1	Oklahoma
2	UCLA
3	Oklahoma State
4	Florida
5	Florida State
6	Texas
7	Arkansas
8	Northwestern
9	Alabama
10	Clemson
11	Virginia Tech
12	Arizona
13	Tennessee
14	Washington
15	Georgia
16	Duke
17	Stanford
18	UCF
19	Oregon State
20	Kentucky
21	Auburn
22	Arizona State
23	Mississippi State
24	Oregon
25	LSU

ESPN.com/USA Softball Collegiate Poll
Ranking	Team
1	Oklahoma
2	UCLA
3	Oklahoma State
4	Florida State
5	Florida
6	Arkansas
7	Alabama
8	Northwestern
9	Texas
10	Clemson
11	Virginia Tech
12	Tennessee
13	Georgia
14	Stanford
15	Arizona
16	Washington
17	Kentucky
18	UCF
19	Duke
20	LSU
21	Auburn
22	Oregon
23	Missouri
24	Louisiana
25	Oregon State

D1Softball
Ranking	Team
1	Oklahoma
2	UCLA
3	Oklahoma State
4	Florida State
5	Florida
6	Alabama
7	Northwestern
8	Arkansas
9	Clemson
10	Georgia
11	Stanford
12	Tennessee
13	Virginia Tech
14	Texas
15	UCF
16	Kentucky
17	LSU
18	Arizona
19	Auburn
20	Louisiana
21	Washington
22	Duke
23	Oregon
24	North Texas
25	Ole Miss

Softball America
Ranking	Team
1	Oklahoma
2	Oklahoma State
3	Florida State
4	UCLA
5	Florida
6	Northwestern
7	Arkansas
8	Alabama
9	Texas
10	Clemson
11	Virginia Tech
12	Georgia
13	Tennessee
14	Arizona
15	Duke
16	UCF
17	Washington
18	Auburn
19	Kentucky
20	Stanford
21	Michigan
22	Louisiana
23	Mississippi State
24	Oregon State
25	Arizona State

== Conference standings ==
2023 America East Conference softball standings
	Conf.						Overall
Team	W		L		T	PCT	W		L		T	PCT
UMBC ‍†‍‡‍^{y}	15	–	4	–	0	.789	25	–	17	–	0	.595
Binghamton ‍‍‍	13	–	7	–	0	.650	29	–	18	–	0	.617
Albany ‍‍‍	11	–	7	–	0	.611	24	–	19	–	0	.558
UMass Lowell ‍‍‍	8	–	12	–	0	.400	21	–	29	–	1	.422
Bryant ‍‍‍	6	–	12	–	0	.333	18	–	29	–	0	.383
Maine ‍‍‍	4	–	15	–	0	.211	16	–	39	–	0	.291
† – Conference champion ‡ – Tournament champion y – Invited to the NCAA tournament As of May 20, 2023; Rankings from NFCA/USA Today

2023 American Athletic Conference softball standings
	Conf.				Overall
Team	W		L	PCT	W		L	PCT
No. 21 Wichita State ‍†‍‍^{y}	16	–	2	.889	44	–	12	.786
UCF ‍‍‡‍^{y}	15	–	3	.833	40	–	21	.656
South Florida ‍‍‍	10	–	7	.588	32	–	24	.571
Tulsa ‍‍‍	9	–	9	.500	25	–	28	.472
Houston ‍‍‍	7	–	10	.412	20	–	30	.400
East Carolina ‍‍‍	3	–	15	.167	27	–	28	.491
Memphis ‍‍‍	2	–	16	.111	8	–	43	.157
† – Conference champion ‡ – Tournament champion y – Invited to the NCAA tournament As of May 20, 2023; Rankings from NFCA/USA Today

2023 ASUN Conference softball standings
	Conf.						Overall
Team	W		L		T	PCT	W		L		T	PCT
No. 23 Central Arkansas ‍‍‡‍^{y}	22	–	2	–	0	.917	45	–	12	–	0	.789
Liberty ‍‍‍^{y}	19	–	5	–	0	.792	40	–	22	–	0	.645
Jacksonville State ‍‍‍	15	–	9	–	0	.625	31	–	22	–	0	.585
Florida Gulf Coast ‍‍‍	13	–	11	–	0	.542	32	–	26	–	0	.552
North Alabama ‍‍‍	12	–	11	–	1	.521	34	–	16	–	1	.676
Stetson ‍‍‍	12	–	12	–	0	.500	28	–	28	–	0	.500
Austin Peay ‍‍‍	12	–	12	–	0	.500	27	–	24	–	0	.529
Jacksonville ‍‍‍	11	–	13	–	0	.458	25	–	27	–	0	.481
Kennesaw State ‍‍‍	11	–	13	–	0	.458	20	–	32	–	0	.385
North Florida ‍‍‍	10	–	13	–	1	.438	29	–	23	–	1	.557
Eastern Kentucky ‍‍‍	10	–	14	–	0	.417	28	–	24	–	0	.538
Queens (NC)* ‍‍‍	10	–	14	–	0	.417	20	–	26	–	0	.435
Lipscomb ‍‍‍	9	–	15	–	0	.375	21	–	29	–	0	.420
Bellarmine* ‍‍‍	1	–	23	–	0	.042	4	–	45	–	0	.082
‡ – Tournament champion y – Invited to the NCAA tournament * ineligible for the 2023 NCAA tournament due to transition from Division II; As of May 20, 2023; Rankings from NFCA/USA Today

2023 Atlantic 10 Conference softball standings
	Conf.						Overall
Team	W		L		T	PCT	W		L		T	PCT
Saint Louis ‍†‍‍	20	–	6	–	0	.769	30	–	26	–	0	.536
Loyola Chicago ‍‍‍	19	–	6	–	0	.760	28	–	23	–	0	.549
Dayton ‍‍‍	15	–	7	–	0	.682	35	–	19	–	0	.648
George Mason ‍‍‡‍^{y}	16	–	10	–	0	.615	35	–	24	–	0	.593
Fordham ‍‍‍	11	–	10	–	0	.524	20	–	28	–	0	.417
Rhode Island ‍‍‍	12	–	13	–	0	.480	23	–	31	–	1	.427
Saint Joseph's ‍‍‍	10	–	14	–	0	.417	20	–	28	–	0	.417
UMass ‍‍‍	8	–	18	–	0	.308	17	–	34	–	0	.333
George Washington ‍‍‍	7	–	19	–	0	.269	17	–	28	–	0	.378
St. Bonaventure ‍‍‍	6	–	20	–	0	.231	11	–	36	–	1	.240
† – Conference champion ‡ – Tournament champion y – Invited to the NCAA tournament As of May 20, 2023; Rankings from NFCA/USA Today

2023 Atlantic Coast Conference softball standings
	Conf.						Overall
Team	W		L		T	PCT	W		L		T	PCT
No. 3 Florida State ‍†‍‡‍^{y}	22	–	2	–	0	.917	58	–	11	–	0	.841
No. 5 Duke ‍‍‍^{y}	19	–	5	–	0	.792	48	–	11	–	0	.814
No. 10 Clemson ‍‍‍^{y}	18	–	6	–	0	.750	49	–	12	–	0	.803
Louisville ‍‍‍^{y}	16	–	7	–	0	.696	34	–	20	–	0	.630
No. 24 Virginia Tech ‍‍‍^{y}	14	–	10	–	0	.583	39	–	20	–	0	.661
North Carolina ‍‍‍	13	–	10	–	0	.565	26	–	28	–	0	.481
Notre Dame ‍‍‍^{y}	11	–	12	–	1	.479	30	–	19	–	1	.610
Virginia ‍‍‍	8	–	16	–	0	.333	30	–	22	–	0	.577
Syracuse ‍‍‍	7	–	15	–	1	.326	19	–	25	–	1	.433
Georgia Tech ‍‍‍	7	–	17	–	0	.292	26	–	27	–	0	.491
Pittsburgh ‍‍‍	6	–	17	–	0	.261	24	–	25	–	0	.490
Boston College ‍‍‍	6	–	18	–	0	.250	24	–	28	–	0	.462
NC State ‍‍‍	6	–	18	–	0	.250	18	–	35	–	0	.340
† – Conference champion ‡ – Tournament champion y – Invited to the NCAA tournament As of June 8, 2023; Rankings from NFCA/USA Today

2023 Big 12 Conference softball standings
	Conf.						Overall
Team	W		L		T	PCT	W		L		T	PCT
No. 1 Oklahoma ‍†‍‡‍^{y}	18	–	0	–	0	1.000	61	–	1	–	0	.984
No. 8 Texas ‍‍‍^{y}	11	–	7	–	0	.611	45	–	15	–	1	.746
No. 9 Oklahoma State ‍‍‍^{y}	10	–	8	–	0	.556	47	–	16	–	0	.746
No. 18 Baylor ‍‍‍^{y}	8	–	10	–	0	.444	40	–	18	–	0	.690
Iowa State ‍‍‍	6	–	12	–	0	.333	25	–	30	–	0	.455
Kansas ‍‍‍	5	–	13	–	0	.278	25	–	27	–	0	.481
Texas Tech ‍‍‍	5	–	13	–	0	.278	31	–	22	–	0	.585
† – Conference champion ‡ – Tournament champion y – Invited to the NCAA tournament As of June 8, 2023; Rankings from NFCA/USA Today

2023 Big East Conference softball standings
	Conf.				Overall
Team	W		L	PCT	W		L	PCT
UConn ‍†‍‍	19	–	5	.792	34	–	15	.694
Seton Hall ‍‍‡‍^{y}	18	–	6	.750	42	–	16	.724
Villanova ‍‍‍	18	–	6	.750	37	–	21	.638
Butler ‍‍‍	12	–	9	.571	18	–	35	.340
St. John's ‍‍‍	8	–	13	.381	23	–	29	.442
DePaul ‍‍‍	9	–	15	.375	19	–	32	.373
Georgetown ‍‍‍	9	–	15	.375	16	–	32	.333
Creighton ‍‍‍	6	–	18	.250	23	–	31	.426
Providence ‍‍‍	6	–	18	.250	15	–	32	.319
† – Conference champion ‡ – Tournament champion y – Invited to the NCAA Tournament; As of May 20, 2023; Rankings from NFCA/USA Today

2023 Big Sky Conference softball standings
	Conf.				Overall
Team	W		L	PCT	W		L	PCT
Idaho State ‍†‍‍	10	–	5	.667	20	–	27	.426
Sacramento State ‍†‍‍	10	–	5	.667	27	–	20	.574
Northern Colorado ‍‍‡‍^{y}	8	–	7	.533	26	–	23	.531
Portland State ‍‍‍	6	–	9	.400	18	–	27	.400
Weber State ‍‍‍	6	–	9	.400	13	–	32	.289
Montana ‍‍‍	5	–	10	.333	11	–	36	.234
† – Conference champion ‡ – Tournament champion y – Invited to the NCAA tournament As of May 20, 2023; Rankings from NFCA/USA Today

2023 Big South Conference softball standings
	Conf.				Overall
Team	W		L	PCT	W		L	PCT
Longwood ‍†‍‍	15	–	5	.750	32	–	21	.604
Campbell ‍†‍‡‍^{y}	15	–	5	.750	42	–	18	.700
USC Upstate ‍‍‍	13	–	8	.619	38	–	17	.691
Charleston Southern ‍‍‍	11	–	9	.550	22	–	27	.449
Gardner-Webb ‍‍‍	9	–	12	.429	20	–	33	.377
Winthrop ‍‍‍	8	–	13	.381	26	–	24	.520
Presbyterian ‍‍‍	6	–	14	.300	25	–	22	.532
Radford ‍‍‍	5	–	16	.238	16	–	34	.320
† – Conference champion ‡ – Tournament champion y – Invited to the NCAA tournament As of May 20, 2023; Rankings from NFCA/USA Today

2023 Big Ten Conference softball standings
	Conf.				Overall
Team	W		L	PCT	W		L	PCT
No. 15 Northwestern ‍†‍‡‍^{y}	20	–	3	.870	42	–	13	.764
Indiana ‍‍‍^{y}	18	–	5	.783	44	–	18	.710
Minnesota ‍‍‍^{y}	17	–	6	.739	38	–	18	.679
Nebraska ‍‍‍^{y}	13	–	10	.565	36	–	22	.621
Wisconsin ‍‍‍	12	–	10	.545	27	–	20	.574
Ohio State ‍‍‍	12	–	11	.522	33	–	20	.623
Maryland ‍‍‍	11	–	11	.500	38	–	19	.667
Penn State ‍‍‍	11	–	11	.500	31	–	16	.660
Iowa ‍‍‍	10	–	13	.435	35	–	27	.565
Michigan ‍‍‍	10	–	13	.435	26	–	25	.510
Rutgers ‍‍‍	9	–	14	.391	32	–	25	.561
Illinois ‍‍‍	6	–	16	.273	29	–	27	.518
Purdue ‍‍‍	6	–	17	.261	23	–	30	.434
Michigan State ‍‍‍	4	–	19	.174	14	–	32	.304
† – Conference champion ‡ – Tournament champion y – Invited to the NCAA Tournament; As of May 28, 2023; Rankings from NFCA/USA Today

2023 Big West Conference softball standings
	Conf.				Overall
Team	W		L	PCT	W		L	PCT
Long Beach State ‍†‍‍^{y}	21	–	6	.778	31	–	23	.574
Cal State Fullerton ‍‍‍^{y}	20	–	7	.741	34	–	21	.618
Cal State Northridge ‍‍‍	19	–	8	.704	28	–	22	.560
UC Davis ‍‍‍	15	–	12	.556	29	–	20	.592
Hawaii ‍‍‍	13	–	14	.481	30	–	23	.566
UC Santa Barbara ‍‍‍	13	–	14	.481	26	–	22	.542
Cal Poly ‍‍‍	12	–	15	.444	19	–	23	.452
UC Riverside ‍‍‍	11	–	16	.407	25	–	28	.472
UC San Diego* ‍‍‍	9	–	18	.333	19	–	33	.365
Cal State Bakersfield ‍‍‍	2	–	25	.074	7	–	43	.140
† – Conference champion y – Invited to the NCAA tournament * ineligible for the 2023 NCAA tournament due to transition from Division II; As of May 20, 2023; Rankings from NFCA/USA Today

2023 Colonial Athletic Association softball standings
	Conf.				Overall
Team	W		L	PCT	W		L	PCT
Delaware ‍†‍‍	18	–	5	.783	29	–	20	.592
UNC Wilmington ‍‍‍	17	–	7	.708	23	–	27	.460
Hofstra ‍‍‡‍^{y}	16	–	7	.696	29	–	27	.518
Elon ‍‍‍	15	–	7	.682	22	–	26	.458
Towson ‍‍‍	14	–	10	.583	30	–	25	.545
Charleston ‍‍‍	11	–	12	.478	19	–	32	.373
Stony Brook ‍‍‍	10	–	13	.435	29	–	27	.518
North Carolina A&T ‍‍‍	10	–	14	.417	17	–	34	.333
Monmouth ‍‍‍	8	–	16	.333	10	–	34	.227
Drexel ‍‍‍	5	–	18	.217	12	–	37	.245
Hampton ‍‍‍	4	–	19	.174	15	–	31	.326
† – Conference champion ‡ – Tournament champion y – Invited to the NCAA tournament As of May 20, 2023; Rankings from NFCA/USA Today

2023 Conference USA softball standings
	Conf.				Overall
Team	W		L	PCT	W		L	PCT
Charlotte ‍†‍‍^{y}	16	–	7	.696	35	–	23	.603
North Texas ‍‍‍	16	–	8	.667	35	–	22	.614
UAB ‍‍‍	16	–	8	.667	29	–	25	.537
Florida Atlantic ‍‍‍	15	–	9	.625	35	–	20	.636
Western Kentucky ‍‍‍	14	–	9	.609	30	–	24	.556
Middle Tennessee ‍‍‡‍^{y}	13	–	10	.565	42	–	20	.677
Louisiana Tech ‍‍‍	13	–	11	.542	32	–	24	.571
FIU ‍‍‍	10	–	14	.417	24	–	27	.471
UTSA ‍‍‍	3	–	20	.130	8	–	41	.163
UTEP ‍‍‍	2	–	22	.083	11	–	34	.244
† – Conference champion ‡ – Tournament champion y – Invited to the NCAA tournament As of May 21, 2023; Rankings from NFCA/USA Today

2023 Horizon League softball standings
	Conf.				Overall
Team	W		L	PCT	W		L	PCT
Oakland ‍†‍‍	14	–	7	.667	21	–	21	.500
Robert Morris ‍‍‍	14	–	8	.636	24	–	23	.511
Northern Kentucky ‍‍‡‍^{y}	14	–	10	.583	24	–	32	.429
IUPUI ‍‍‍	12	–	10	.545	16	–	31	.340
Green Bay ‍‍‍	12	–	10	.545	22	–	31	.415
Youngstown State ‍‍‍	12	–	10	.545	27	–	27	.500
Cleveland State ‍‍‍	11	–	12	.478	15	–	32	.319
Purdue Fort Wayne ‍‍‍	9	–	14	.391	17	–	32	.347
Detroit Mercy ‍‍‍	3	–	20	.130	4	–	34	.105
† – Conference champion ‡ – Tournament champion y – Invited to the NCAA tournament As of May 20, 2023; Rankings from NFCA/USA Today

2023 NCAA Division I softball independents standings
	Conf.				Overall
Team	W		L	PCT	W		L	PCT
Hartford ‍‍‍		–		–	16	–	16	.500
y – Invited to the NCAA tournament As of April 27, 2023; Rankings from NFCA/USA Today

2023 Ivy League softball standings
	Conf.						Overall
Team	W		L		T	PCT	W		L		T	PCT
Harvard ‍†‍‡‍^{y}	16	–	5	–	0	.762	29	–	17	–	1	.628
Princeton ‍†‍‍	16	–	5	–	0	.762	29	–	20	–	0	.592
Yale ‍‍‍	11	–	10	–	0	.524	20	–	23	–	0	.465
Columbia ‍‍‍	11	–	10	–	0	.524	17	–	23	–	0	.425
Cornell ‍‍‍	9	–	12	–	0	.429	16	–	26	–	0	.381
Brown ‍‍‍	9	–	12	–	0	.429	13	–	26	–	0	.333
Dartmouth ‍‍‍	8	–	13	–	0	.381	14	–	25	–	0	.359
Penn ‍‍‍	4	–	17	–	0	.190	8	–	37	–	0	.178
† – Conference champion ‡ – Tournament champion y – Invited to the NCAA tournament As of May 20, 2023; Rankings from NFCA/USA Today

2023 Mid-American Conference softball standings
	Conf.				Overall
Team	W		L	PCT	W		L	PCT
Miami (OH) ‍†‍‡‍^{y}	21	–	8	.724	39	–	20	.661
Ohio ‍‍‍	20	–	9	.690	31	–	22	.585
Central Michigan ‍‍‍	18	–	11	.621	29	–	26	.527
Ball State ‍‍‍	17	–	12	.586	27	–	26	.509
Akron ‍‍‍	16	–	13	.552	28	–	23	.549
Northern Illinois ‍‍‍	15	–	13	.536	26	–	25	.510
Toledo ‍‍‍	14	–	14	.500	21	–	25	.457
Kent State ‍‍‍	13	–	14	.481	18	–	31	.367
Western Michigan ‍‍‍	11	–	15	.423	17	–	29	.370
Buffalo ‍‍‍	8	–	18	.308	14	–	36	.280
Bowling Green ‍‍‍	2	–	28	.067	9	–	41	.180
† – Conference champion ‡ – Tournament champion y – Invited to the NCAA tournament As of May 21, 2023; Rankings from NFCA/USA Today

2023 Metro Atlantic Athletic Conference softball standings
	Conf.						Overall
Team	W		L		T	PCT	W		L		T	PCT
Canisius ‍†‍‍	17	–	3	–	0	.850	30	–	16	–	1	.649
Mount St. Mary's ‍‍‍	15	–	5	–	0	.750	32	–	19	–	0	.627
Marist ‍‍‡‍^{y}	12	–	8	–	0	.600	29	–	28	–	0	.509
Fairfield ‍‍‍	11	–	9	–	0	.550	22	–	25	–	0	.468
Siena ‍‍‍	11	–	9	–	0	.550	32	–	21	–	0	.604
Iona ‍‍‍	10	–	10	–	0	.500	21	–	31	–	1	.406
Saint Peter's ‍‍‍	9	–	11	–	0	.450	30	–	21	–	0	.588
Rider ‍‍‍	9	–	11	–	0	.450	19	–	31	–	0	.380
Manhattan ‍‍‍	8	–	12	–	0	.400	13	–	35	–	0	.271
Quinnipiac ‍‍‍	5	–	15	–	0	.250	17	–	25	–	0	.405
Niagara ‍‍‍	3	–	17	–	0	.150	9	–	34	–	0	.209
† – Conference champion ‡ – Tournament champion y – Invited to the NCAA tournament As of May 14, 2023; Rankings from NFCA/USA Today

2023 Mid-Eastern Athletic Conference softball standings
	Conf.				Overall
Team	W		L	PCT	W		L	PCT
Morgan State ‍†‍‍	14	–	4	.778	24	–	21	.533
Norfolk State ‍‍‍	14	–	6	.700	24	–	23	.511
North Carolina Central ‍‍‡‍^{y}	12	–	7	.632	19	–	34	.358
Howard ‍‍‍	10	–	9	.526	20	–	26	.435
Coppin State ‍‍‍	9	–	11	.450	16	–	28	.364
Maryland Eastern Shore ‍‍‍	8	–	10	.444	14	–	30	.318
South Carolina State ‍‍‍	6	–	11	.353	8	–	27	.229
Delaware State ‍‍‍	2	–	17	.105	8	–	31	.205
† – Conference champion ‡ – Tournament champion y – Invited to the NCAA tournament As of May 20, 2023; Rankings from NFCA/USA Today

2023 Missouri Valley Conference softball standings
	Conf.				Overall
Team	W		L	PCT	W		L	PCT
Northern Iowa ‍†‍‍	26	–	1	.963	39	–	12	.765
Missouri State ‍‍‍	21	–	6	.778	31	–	20	.608
Illinois State ‍‍‍	19	–	7	.731	30	–	22	.577
Murray State ‍‍‍	17	–	10	.630	33	–	21	.611
Indiana State ‍‍‍	17	–	10	.630	32	–	25	.561
Southern Illinois ‍‍‡‍^{y}	13	–	14	.481	36	–	20	.643
Belmont ‍‍‍	12	–	14	.462	29	–	24	.547
Drake ‍‍‍	10	–	17	.370	18	–	34	.346
Evansville ‍‍‍	8	–	19	.296	22	–	32	.407
Bradley ‍‍‍	7	–	20	.259	15	–	40	.273
UIC ‍‍‍	7	–	20	.259	9	–	43	.173
Valparaiso ‍‍‍	4	–	23	.148	8	–	41	.163
† – Conference champion ‡ – Tournament champion y – Invited to the NCAA tournament As of May 20, 2023; Rankings from NFCA/USA Today

2023 Mountain West Conference softball standings
	Conf.				Overall
Team	W		L	PCT	W		L	PCT
Boise State ‍†‍‍	16	–	5	.762	32	–	17	.653
San Diego State ‍‍‡‍^{y}	16	–	6	.727	39	–	17	.696
Colorado State ‍‍‍	11	–	10	.524	31	–	21	.596
San Jose State ‍‍‍	11	–	11	.500	26	–	28	.481
Nevada ‍‍‍	10	–	12	.455	31	–	19	.620
Fresno State ‍‍‍	10	–	12	.455	24	–	34	.414
UNLV ‍‍‍	9	–	13	.409	23	–	27	.460
Utah State ‍‍‍	9	–	13	.409	18	–	26	.409
New Mexico ‍‍‍	6	–	16	.273	19	–	31	.380
† – Conference champion ‡ – Tournament champion y – Invited to the NCAA tournament As of May 28, 2023; Rankings from NFCA/USA Today

2023 Northeast Conference softball standings
	Conf.				Overall
Team	W		L	PCT	W		L	PCT
Saint Francis (PA) ‍†‍‍	15	–	6	.714	26	–	23	.531
Central Connecticut ‍‍‍	14	–	7	.667	21	–	16	.568
LIU ‍‍‡‍^{y}	14	–	7	.667	31	–	24	.564
Merrimack* ‍‍‍	11	–	10	.524	18	–	30	.375
Fairleigh Dickinson ‍‍‍	10	–	11	.476	24	–	27	.471
Sacred Heart ‍‍‍	9	–	12	.429	18	–	29	.383
Wagner ‍‍‍	9	–	12	.429	13	–	27	.325
Stonehill ‍‍‍	2	–	19	.095	4	–	42	.087
† – Conference champion ‡ – Tournament champion y – Invited to the NCAA tournament * ineligible for the 2023 NCAA tournament due to transition from Division II; As of May 14, 2023; Rankings from NFCA/USA Today

2023 Ohio Valley Conference softball standings
	Conf.						Overall
Team	W		L		T	PCT	W		L		T	PCT
Southeast Missouri State ‍†‍‍	20	–	2	–	0	.909	29	–	14	–	0	.674
Eastern Illinois ‍‍‡‍^{y}	16	–	6	–	0	.727	34	–	21	–	0	.618
Southern Indiana* ‍‍‍	13	–	9	–	0	.591	21	–	23	–	0	.477
UT Martin ‍‍‍	13	–	10	–	0	.565	23	–	24	–	0	.489
SIU Edwardsville ‍‍‍	12	–	10	–	0	.545	30	–	26	–	0	.536
Tennessee State ‍‍‍	12	–	11	–	0	.522	22	–	26	–	1	.459
Lindenwood* ‍‍‍	8	–	15	–	0	.348	16	–	32	–	0	.333
Morehead State ‍‍‍	6	–	18	–	0	.250	11	–	33	–	0	.250
Tennessee Tech ‍‍‍	2	–	21	–	0	.087	6	–	44	–	0	.120
† – Conference champion ‡ – Tournament champion y – Invited to the NCAA tournament * ineligible for the 2023 NCAA tournament due to transition from Division II; As of May 20, 2023; Rankings from NFCA/USA Today

2023 Pac-12 Conference softball standings
	Conf.						Overall
Team	W		L		T	PCT	W		L		T	PCT
No. 2 UCLA ‍†‍‍^{y}	21	–	3	–	0	.875	52	–	7	–	0	.881
No. 6 Washington ‍‍‍^{y}	16	–	8	–	0	.667	44	–	14	–	0	.759
No. 17 Utah ‍‍‡‍^{y}	15	–	9	–	0	.625	42	–	16	–	0	.724
No. 7 Stanford ‍‍‍^{y}	14	–	10	–	0	.583	47	–	15	–	0	.758
No. 19 Oregon ‍‍‍^{y}	14	–	10	–	0	.583	38	–	17	–	0	.691
California ‍‍‍^{y}	9	–	14	–	1	.396	35	–	21	–	1	.623
Oregon State ‍‍‍	6	–	17	–	1	.271	15	–	29	–	1	.344
Arizona ‍‍‍	6	–	18	–	0	.250	29	–	25	–	0	.537
Arizona State ‍‍‍	6	–	18	–	0	.250	22	–	26	–	0	.458
† – Conference champion ‡ – Tournament champion y – Invited to the NCAA Tournament; As of June 5, 2023; Rankings from NFCA/USA Today

2023 Patriot League softball standings
	Conf.						Overall
Team	W		L		T	PCT	W		L		T	PCT
No. 25 Boston University ‍†‍‡‍^{y}	17	–	1	–	0	.944	51	–	9	–	0	.850
Lehigh ‍‍‍	16	–	2	–	0	.889	40	–	14	–	0	.741
Army ‍‍‍	10	–	8	–	0	.556	22	–	37	–	0	.373
Bucknell ‍‍‍	8	–	10	–	0	.444	16	–	31	–	0	.340
Colgate ‍‍‍	6	–	12	–	0	.333	17	–	31	–	0	.354
Lafayette ‍‍‍	4	–	14	–	0	.222	8	–	36	–	1	.189
Holy Cross ‍‍‍	2	–	16	–	0	.111	15	–	36	–	1	.298
† – Conference champion ‡ – Tournament champion y – Invited to the NCAA tournament As of May 20, 2023; Rankings from NFCA/USA Today

2023 Southeastern Conference softball standings
	Conf.						Overall
Team	W		L		T	PCT	W		L		T	PCT
No. 3 Tennessee ‍†‍‡‍^{y}	19	–	5	–	0	.792	51	–	10	–	0	.836
No. 14 Georgia ‍‍‍^{y}	16	–	7	–	0	.696	42	–	15	–	0	.737
No. 20 Auburn ‍‍‍^{y}	15	–	9	–	0	.625	43	–	19	–	0	.694
No. 7 Alabama ‍‍‍^{y}	14	–	10	–	0	.583	45	–	22	–	0	.672
No. 17 Arkansas ‍‍‍^{y}	14	–	10	–	0	.583	40	–	19	–	0	.678
No. 16 LSU ‍‍‍^{y}	13	–	11	–	0	.542	42	–	17	–	0	.712
Texas A&M ‍‍‍^{y}	12	–	12	–	0	.500	35	–	21	–	0	.625
No. 21 Florida ‍‍‍^{y}	11	–	13	–	0	.458	38	–	22	–	0	.633
No. 24 Kentucky ‍‍‍^{y}	10	–	14	–	0	.417	31	–	22	–	1	.583
No. 25 South Carolina ‍‍‍^{y}	9	–	15	–	0	.375	40	–	22	–	0	.645
Ole Miss ‍‍‍^{y}	8	–	16	–	0	.333	32	–	28	–	0	.533
Mississippi State ‍‍‍	7	–	16	–	0	.304	28	–	25	–	0	.528
Missouri ‍‍‍^{y}	7	–	17	–	0	.292	35	–	26	–	0	.574
† – Conference champion ‡ – Tournament champion y – Invited to the NCAA tournament As of June 5, 2023; Rankings from NFCA/USA Today

2023 Southern Conference softball standings
	Conf.				Overall
Team	W		L	PCT	W		L	PCT
UNC Greensboro ‍†‍‡‍^{y}	13	–	4	.765	37	–	22	.627
Samford ‍‍‍	12	–	6	.667	26	–	31	.456
Furman ‍‍‍	8	–	9	.471	20	–	32	.385
Western Carolina ‍‍‍	8	–	10	.444	21	–	26	.447
Mercer ‍‍‍	8	–	10	.444	20	–	37	.351
Chattanooga ‍‍‍	7	–	11	.389	25	–	27	.481
East Tennessee State ‍‍‍	6	–	12	.333	17	–	37	.315
† – Conference champion ‡ – Tournament champion y – Invited to the NCAA tournament As of May 20, 2023; Rankings from NFCA/USA Today

2023 Southland Conference softball standings
	Conf.						Overall
Team	W		L		T	PCT	W		L		T	PCT
McNeese ‍†‍‡‍^{y}	21	–	3	–	0	.875	47	–	16	–	0	.746
Southeastern Louisiana ‍‍‍	19	–	5	–	0	.792	47	–	14	–	0	.770
Nicholls ‍‍‍	13	–	11	–	0	.542	29	–	24	–	0	.547
Lamar ‍‍‍	12	–	12	–	0	.500	22	–	34	–	0	.393
Texas A&M–Corpus Christi ‍‍‍	11	–	13	–	0	.458	24	–	24	–	0	.500
Northwestern State ‍‍‍	10	–	14	–	0	.417	25	–	27	–	0	.481
Houston Christian ‍‍‍	9	–	15	–	0	.375	20	–	33	–	0	.377
Incarnate Word ‍‍‍	8	–	16	–	0	.333	16	–	30	–	1	.351
Texas A&M–Commerce* ‍‍‍	5	–	19	–	0	.208	9	–	39	–	0	.188
† – Conference champion ‡ – Tournament champion y – Invited to the NCAA tournament * Ineligible for the 2023 NCAA tournament due to transition from Division II; As of May 21, 2023; Rankings from NFCA/USA Today

2023 Southwestern Athletic Conference softball standings
	Conf.						Overall
Team	W		L		T	PCT	W		L		T	PCT
East
Alabama State ^{x}‍‍‍	17	–	7	–	0	.708	30	–	21	–	0	.588
Bethune-Cookman ‍‍‍	15	–	9	–	0	.625	19	–	31	–	0	.380
Alabama A&M ‍‍‍	13	–	11	–	0	.542	22	–	19	–	0	.537
Florida A&M ‍‍‍	13	–	11	–	0	.542	20	–	22	–	0	.476
Jackson State ‍‍‍	13	–	11	–	0	.542	24	–	26	–	0	.480
Mississippi Valley State ‍‍‍	1	–	23	–	0	.042	2	–	40	–	0	.048
West
Prairie View A&M ^{x}‍‍‡‍^{y}	22	–	2	–	0	.917	28	–	20	–	0	.583
Grambling State ‍‍‍	15	–	9	–	0	.625	33	–	21	–	1	.609
Texas Southern ‍‍‍	12	–	12	–	0	.500	16	–	24	–	0	.400
Alcorn State ‍‍‍	11	–	15	–	0	.423	18	–	30	–	0	.375
Southern ‍‍‍	8	–	16	–	0	.333	13	–	34	–	0	.277
Arkansas-Pine Bluff ‍‍‍	4	–	20	–	0	.167	10	–	38	–	0	.208
x – Division champion ‡ – Tournament champion y – Invited to the NCAA tournament As of May 20, 2023; Rankings from NFCA/USA Today

2023 Summit League softball standings
	Conf.				Overall
Team	W		L	PCT	W		L	PCT
South Dakota State ‍†‍‍	17	–	0	1.000	37	–	17	.685
Omaha ‍‍‡‍^{y}	15	–	5	.750	33	–	17	.660
North Dakota State ‍‍‍	13	–	8	.619	30	–	21	.588
South Dakota ‍‍‍	11	–	9	.550	24	–	28	.462
North Dakota ‍‍‍	9	–	10	.474	12	–	38	.240
St. Thomas* ‍‍‍	6	–	14	.300	18	–	35	.340
Kansas City ‍‍‍	4	–	17	.190	9	–	43	.173
Western Illinois ‍‍‍	3	–	15	.167	9	–	36	.200
† – Conference champion ‡ – Tournament champion y – Invited to the NCAA tournament * Ineligible for the 2023 NCAA tournament due to transition from Division III; As of May 20, 2023; Rankings from NFCA/USA Today

2023 Sun Belt Conference softball standings
	Conf.						Overall
Team	W		L		T	PCT	W		L		T	PCT
Louisiana ‍†‍‡‍^{y}	22	–	2	–	0	.917	47	–	14	–	0	.770
South Alabama ‍‍‍	20	–	4	–	0	.833	39	–	14	–	0	.736
Marshall ‍‍‍	17	–	5	–	0	.773	45	–	9	–	0	.833
Troy ‍‍‍	14	–	9	–	1	.604	33	–	19	–	1	.632
Texas State ‍‍‍^{y}	13	–	9	–	1	.587	34	–	23	–	1	.595
James Madison ‍‍‍	13	–	11	–	0	.542	28	–	19	–	0	.596
Coastal Carolina ‍‍‍	11	–	13	–	0	.458	36	–	20	–	0	.643
Louisiana-Monroe ‍‍‍	7	–	17	–	0	.292	25	–	32	–	0	.439
Georgia State ‍‍‍	7	–	17	–	0	.292	18	–	36	–	0	.333
Southern Miss ‍‍‍	6	–	17	–	0	.261	22	–	24	–	0	.478
Georgia Southern ‍‍‍	6	–	18	–	0	.250	17	–	34	–	0	.333
Appalachian State ‍‍‍	4	–	18	–	0	.182	23	–	28	–	0	.451
† – Conference champion ‡ – Tournament champion y – Invited to the NCAA tournament As of May 28, 2023; Rankings from NFCA/USA Today

2023 Western Athletic Conference softball standings
	Conf.				Overall
Team	W		L	PCT	W		L	PCT
Utah Tech* ‍†‍‍	19	–	5	.792	35	–	18	.660
Grand Canyon ‍‍‡‍^{y}	17	–	7	.708	47	–	13	.783
Stephen F. Austin ‍‍‍	15	–	9	.625	30	–	24	.556
Seattle ‍‍‍	14	–	10	.583	36	–	20	.643
Tarleton* ‍‍‍	13	–	11	.542	30	–	27	.526
Sam Houston ‍‍‍	12	–	12	.500	22	–	35	.386
UT Arlington ‍‍‍	11	–	13	.458	22	–	30	.423
California Baptist ‍‍‍	10	–	14	.417	28	–	19	.596
New Mexico State ‍‍‍	10	–	14	.417	21	–	25	.457
Utah Valley ‍‍‍	10	–	14	.417	17	–	32	.347
Abilene Christian ‍‍‍	10	–	14	.417	15	–	36	.294
Southern Utah ‍‍‍	3	–	21	.125	6	–	33	.154
† – Conference champion ‡ – Tournament champion y – Invited to the NCAA tournament * Ineligible for the 2023 NCAA tournament due to transition from Division II; As of May 20, 2023; Rankings from NFCA/USA Today

2023 West Coast Conference softball standings
	Conf.						Overall
Team	W		L		T	PCT	W		L		T	PCT
Loyola Marymount ‍†‍‍^{y}	12	–	3	–	0	.800	26	–	23	–	0	.531
BYU ‍‍‍	11	–	4	–	0	.733	35	–	17	–	0	.673
Saint Mary's ‍‍‍	9	–	6	–	0	.600	20	–	29	–	0	.408
San Diego ‍‍‍	8	–	7	–	0	.533	23	–	29	–	1	.443
Santa Clara ‍‍‍	4	–	11	–	0	.267	23	–	26	–	0	.469
Pacific ‍‍‍	1	–	14	–	0	.067	10	–	30	–	0	.250
† – Conference champion y – Invited to the NCAA tournament As of May 20, 2023; Rankings from NFCA/USA Today

== Awards ==
- USA Softball Collegiate Player of the Year: Valerie Cagle, Clemson
- NFCA National Player of the Year: Skylar Wallace, Florida
- Softball America Player of the Year: Valerie Cagle, Clemson
- NFCA National Pitcher of the Year: Ashley Rogers, Tennessee
- Softball America Pitcher of the Year: Montana Fouts, Alabama
- NFCA National Freshman of the Year: NiJaree Canady, Stanford
- Softball America Freshman of the Year: NiJaree Canady, Stanford
- Softball America Defensive Player of the Year: Grace Lyons, Oklahoma
- NFCA Catcher of the Year: Terra McGowan, Oregon
- NFCA Golden Shoe Award: Mihyia Davis, Louisiana

== All-America Teams ==
The following players were members of the All-American Teams.

First Team

Position	Player	Class	School
P	Ashley Rogers	GS	Tennessee
P	Megan Faraimo	R-SR.	UCLA
P	Montana Fouts	GS	Alabama
C	Terra McGowan	R-SR.	Oregon
1B	Baylee Klingler	GS	Washington
2B	Tiare Jennings	JR.	Oklahoma
3B	Alyssa Brito	SO.	Oklahoma
SS	Skylar Wallace	R-JR.	Florida
OF	Kiki Milloy	SR.	Tennessee
OF	Jayda Coleman	JR.	Oklahoma
OF	Jayda Kearney	JR.	Georgia
UT	Valerie Cagle	JR.	Clemson
UT	Rylin Hedgecock	R-JR.	Arkansas
AT-L	Sydney McKinney	SR.	Wichita State
AT-L	Maya Brady	R-JR.	UCLA
AT-L	Jordy Bahl	SO.	Oklahoma
AT-L	Maddie Penta	JR.	Auburn
AT-L	Kinzie Hansen	JR.	Oklahoma

Second Team

Position	Player	Class	School
P	Kathryn Sandercock	R-SR.	Florida State
P	Kelly Maxwell	R-SR.	Oklahoma State
P	Alana Vawter	SR.	Stanford
C	Kayla Kowalik	GS	Kentucky
1B	Shaylon Govan	SO.	Baylor
2B	Allee Bunker	GS	Oregon
3B	Megan Grant	FR.	UCLA
SS	Erin Coffel	JR.	Kentucky
OF	Yannira Acuña	GS	Arizona State
OF	D'Auna Jennings	FR.	Duke
OF	Alex Honnold	JR.	Missouri
UT	Taylor Roby	R-SR.	Louisville
UT	Karly Heath	JR.	Louisiana
AT-L	Taryn Kern	FR.	Indiana
AT-L	McKenna Gibson	SO.	Tennessee
AT-L	Rachel Becker	GS	Oklahoma State
AT-L	Autumn Pease	GS	Minnesota
AT-L	Chenise Delce	R-SR.	Arkansas

Third Team

Position	Player	Class	School
P	Lexi Kilfoyl	SR.	Oklahoma State
P	Sydney Berzon	FR.	LSU
P	Mariah Lopez	JR.	Utah
C	Taylor Krapf	SO.	Minnesota
C	Julia Cottrill	JR.	Texas A&M
1B	Jordan Woolery	FR.	UCLA
2B	Sydney Kuma	JR.	Georgia
3B	Makena Smith	SR.	California
SS	Billie Andrews	SR.	Nebraska
OF	Sami Reynolds	GS	Washington
OF	Mihyia Davis	FR.	Louisiana
OF	Ashley Trierweiler	R-SO.	Santa Clara
UT	Brianna Copeland	FR.	Indiana
UT	Kayla Konwent	GS	Wisconsin
AT-L	Ruby Meylan	FR.	Washington
AT-L	Taylor Minnick	SO.	Indiana
AT-L	Autumn Owen	SO.	Marshall
AT-L	Kiley Naomi	GS	Oklahoma State
AT-L	Kayla Roncin	JR.	Boston University

== See also ==
- 2023 NCAA Division I baseball season
