= 2023 Marshall Thundering Herd softball team =

American college softball season

2023 Marshall Thundering Herd softball
- Conference: Sun Belt Conference
- Record: 45–10 (17–5 SBC)
- Head coach: Megan Smith Lyon (5th season)
- Assistant coaches: Corey Lyon; Maddie Holub
- Home stadium: Dot Hicks Field

2023 Sun Belt Conference softball standings
	Conf.						Overall
Team	W		L		T	PCT	W		L		T	PCT
Louisiana ‍†‍‡‍^{y}	22	–	2	–	0	.917	47	–	14	–	0	.770
South Alabama ‍‍‍	20	–	4	–	0	.833	39	–	14	–	0	.736
Marshall ‍‍‍	17	–	5	–	0	.773	45	–	9	–	0	.833
Troy ‍‍‍	14	–	9	–	1	.604	33	–	19	–	1	.632
Texas State ‍‍‍^{y}	13	–	9	–	1	.587	34	–	23	–	1	.595
James Madison ‍‍‍	13	–	11	–	0	.542	28	–	19	–	0	.596
Coastal Carolina ‍‍‍	11	–	13	–	0	.458	36	–	20	–	0	.643
Louisiana-Monroe ‍‍‍	7	–	17	–	0	.292	25	–	32	–	0	.439
Georgia State ‍‍‍	7	–	17	–	0	.292	18	–	36	–	0	.333
Southern Miss ‍‍‍	6	–	17	–	0	.261	22	–	24	–	0	.478
Georgia Southern ‍‍‍	6	–	18	–	0	.250	17	–	34	–	0	.333
Appalachian State ‍‍‍	4	–	18	–	0	.182	23	–	28	–	0	.451
† – Conference champion ‡ – Tournament champion y – Invited to the NCAA tournament As of May 28, 2023; Rankings from NFCA/USA Today

The 2023 Marshall Thundering Herd softball team represented Marshall University during the 2023 NCAA Division I softball season. The Thundering Herd played their home games at Dot Hicks Field and were led by fifth-year head coach Megan Smith Lyon. They were members of the Sun Belt Conference.

== Preseason ==
=== Sun Belt Conference Coaches Poll ===
The Sun Belt Conference Coaches Poll was released on February 2, 2023. Marshall was picked to finish sixth in the conference with 80 votes.

Coaches poll
Predicted finish	Team	Votes (1st place)
1	Louisiana	144 (12)
2	Texas State	130
3	South Alabama	118
4	Troy	99
5	James Madison	93
6	Marshall	80
7	Southern Miss	68
8	Appalachian State	63
9	Louisiana–Monroe	44
10	Coastal Carolina	43
11	Georgia State; Georgia Southern	27

== Personnel ==
2023 Marshall Thundering Herd softball team
Players
Coaches

#	Pos.	Name	Bats/throws	Height	Year	Home town
00	C	Autumn Owen	/	—	Jr	Mill Spring, North Carolina
1	OF	Grace Chelemen	/	5 ft 3 in (1.6 m)	Sr	Woodhaven, Michigan
2	OF	Kasey Wilhoit (redshirt)	/	—	Jr	Trafalgar, Indiana
3	OF	Erica Holt	/	—	Jr	Newport Beach, California
4	OF	Alex Coleman	/	—	So	Asheboro, North Carolina
5	P	Savannah Rice	/	—	Jr	Marshall, North Carolina
6	OF	Aaliyah Crews	/	—	Fr	Loxahatchee, Florida
8	C	Abby Darnley	/	—	Fr	Eleanor, West Virginia
9	INF	Lauren Love	/	—	So	Matthews, North Carolina
11	INF	Sydney Bickel	/	—	Jr	Peoria, Arizona
13	INF	Rielly Lucas	/	—	So	Huntington, West Virginia
14	P	Cailey Joyce (redshirt)	/	—	Sr	Mechanicsburg, Pennsylvania
17	C	Emily Allen	/	—	So	Parkersburg, West Virginia
20	INF	Camryn Michallas (redshirt)	/	—	Jr	Huntington, West Virginia
21	P	Sydney Nester (redshirt)	/	—	Sr	Hillsville, Virginia
24	P	Bri Godfrey	/	—	Fr	Deerfield Beach, Florida
48	P	Bub Feringa	/	—	So	Glendale, Arizona
49	INF	Brooklyn Ulrich (redshirt)	/	—	Fr	Mesa, Arizona

Head coach

Megan Smith Lyon (North Carolina)

Assistant coach(es)

Corey Lyon (Baker)
Maddie Holub (Fort Hays State)

Legend

- (C) Team captain
- (S) Suspended
- (I) Ineligible
- Injured
- Current redshirt

Roster
Last update: 9 April 2023

== Schedule and results ==
Legend
	Marshall win
	Marshall loss
	Postponement/Cancellation
**Bold**	Marshall team member

2023 Marshall Thundering Herd softball game log
Regular season (43–9)

February (11–3)
Date	Opponent	Rank	Site/stadium	Score	Win	Loss	Save	TV	Attendance	Overall record	SBC record
Florida Spring Games
Feb. 10	vs. Portland State		Sleepy Hollow Sports Complex • Leesburg, FL	**W** 8–1	**Nester** (1-0)	Nakoa-Chu (0-1)	None		205	1–0	
Feb. 11	vs. Butler		Sleepy Hollow Sports Complex • Leesburg, FL	**L** 6–7	Dyer (1-0)	**Joyce** (0-1)	None		128	1–1	
Feb. 11	vs. Colgate		Sleepy Hollow Sports Complex • Leesburg, FL	**W** 5–4	**Nester** (2-0)	Acker (0-1)	None		133	2–1	
Feb. 12	vs. Butler		Sleepy Hollow Sports Complex • Leesburg, FL	**W** 7–3	**Nester** (3-0)	Dyer (1-2)	None		304	3–1	
Chattanooga Challenge
Feb. 17	vs. Maine		Frost Stadium • Chattanooga, TN	**W** 16–0^{5}	**Nester** (4-0)	Rieth (0-1)	None		107	4—1	
Feb. 18	vs. Indiana State		Frost Stadium • Chattanooga, TN	**W** 3–2	**Rice** (1-0)	Newbanks (0-1)	None		189	5–1	
Feb. 18	at Chattanooga		Frost Stadium • Chattanooga, TN	**L** 4–7	Long (1-0)	**Nester** (4-1)	None			5–2	
Feb. 19	vs. Western Illinois		Frost Stadium • Chattanooga, TN	**W** 14–1^{5}	**Godfrey** (1-0)	Rodriguez (0-1)	None		103	6–2	
Feb. 19	vs. Indiana State		Frost Stadium • Chattanooga, TN	**W** 1–0	**Nester** (5-1)	Newbanks (0-2)	None		215	7–2	
Liberty Classic
Feb. 24	vs. Northern Illinois		Kamphuis Field at Liberty Softball Stadium • Lynchburg, VA	**W** 5–0	**Nester** (6-1)	Cassell (0-1)	None		117	8–2	
Feb. 24	vs. Morgan State		Kamphuis Field at Liberty Softball Stadium • Lynchburg, VA	**W** 11–0^{5}	**Rice** (2-0)	Raubuch (1-3)	None		117	9–2	
Feb. 25	vs. Princeton		Kamphuis Field at Liberty Softball Stadium • Lynchburg, VA	**W** 10–2^{6}	**Nester** (7-1)	Chambers (1-1)	None		117	10–2	
Feb. 26	at Liberty		Kamphuis Field at Liberty Softball Stadium • Lynchburg, VA	**L** 4–5^{8}	Keeney (3-5)	**Nester** (7-2)	None		409	10–3	
Feb. 26	vs. Elon		Kamphuis Field at Liberty Softball Stadium • Lynchburg, VA	**W** 7–3	**Rice** (3-0)	McCard (1-2)	**Godfrey** (1)		217	11–3	

March (17–0)
Date	Opponent	Rank	Site/stadium	Score	Win	Loss	Save	TV	Attendance	Overall record	SBC record
Thundering Herd Round Robin
Mar. 2	Morehead State		Dot Hicks Field • Huntington, WV	**W** 9–1^{6}	**Nester** (8-2)	Ogden (1-3)	None	ESPN+	234	12–3	
Mar. 2	Morehead State		Dot Hicks Field • Huntington, WV	**W** 9–1^{5}	**Rice** (4-0)	Spicer (1-2)	None		234	13–3	
Mar. 4	Kent State		Dot Hicks Field • Huntington, WV	**W** 8–1	**Nester** (9-2)	Bowers (1-4)	None	ESPN+	670	14–3	
Mar. 5	Kent State		Dot Hicks Field • Huntington, WV	**W** 10–2^{5}	**Feringa** (1-0)	Irelan (2-6)	None	ESPN+	545	15–3	
Mar. 5	Pittsburgh		Dot Hicks Field • Huntington, WV	**W** 4–3	**Nester** (10-2)	Drogemuller (4-3)	None	ESPN+	545	16–3	
Mar. 8	Ohio		Dot Hicks Field • Huntington, WV	**W** 6–4	**Nester** (11-2)	Miller (3-5)	None	ESPN+	396	17–3	
Thundering Herd March Madness
Mar. 9	Cleveland State		Dot Hicks Field • Huntington, WV	**W** 9–1^{6}	**Godfrey** (2-0)	Jenkins (0-4)	**Rice** (1)		243	18–3	
Mar. 10	Winthrop		Dot Hicks Field • Huntington, WV	**W** 8–1	**Nester** (12-2)	Boulware (5-2)	None	ESPN+	139	19–3	
Mar. 11	Cleveland State		Dot Hicks Field • Huntington, WV	**W** 9–1^{5}	**Rice** (5-0)	Watts (1-1)	None	ESPN+	243	20–3	
Mar. 1	Rider		Dot Hicks Field • Huntington, WV	**W** 7–0	**Nester** (13-2)	Schmierer (1-3)	None	ESPN+	293	21–3	
Mar. 18	at Appalachian State		Sywassink/Lloyd Family Stadium • Boone, NC	**W** 8–0^{6}	**Nester** (14-2)	Northrop (6-2)	None	ESPN+	241	22–3	1–0
Mar. 18	at Appalachian State		Sywassink/Lloyd Family Stadium • Boone, NC	Game cancelled							
Mar. 19	at Appalachian State		Sywassink/Lloyd Family Stadium • Boone, NC	Game cancelled							
Mar. 22	vs. UT Martin		Knights Field • Louisville, KY	**W** 4–1	**Rice** (6-0)	Linneman (4-4)	None		50	23–3	
Mar. 22	Bellarmine		Knights Field • Louisville, KY	**W** 17–2^{6}	**Godfrey** (3-0)	Jensen (1-4)	None		80	24–3	
Mar. 25	Southern Miss		Dot Hicks Field • Huntington, WV	**W** 4–0	**Nester** (15-2)	Leinstock (8-8)	None	ESPN+	671	25–3	2–0
Mar. 25	Southern Miss		Dot Hicks Field • Huntington, WV	**W** 17–9^{6}	**Godfrey** (4-0)	Lee (3-3)	None	ESPN+	641	26–3	3–0
Mar. 26	Southern Miss		Dot Hicks Field • Huntington, WV	**W** 4–0	**Nester** (16-2)	Leinstock (8-9)	None	ESPN+	683	27–3	4–0
Mar. 28	Northern Kentucky		Dot Hicks Field • Huntington, WV	**W** 13–1^{5}	**Rice** (7-0)	Flores (4-10)	None	ESPN+	567	28–3	

April (12–6)
Date	Opponent	Rank	Site/stadium	Score	Win	Loss	Save	TV	Attendance	Overall record	SBC record
Apr. 1	Georgia State		Dot Hicks Field • Huntington, WV	**W** 6–1	**Nester** (17-2)	Doolittle (6-5)	None	ESPN+	495	29–3	5–0
Apr. 2	Georgia State		Dot Hicks Field • Huntington, WV	**W** 5–1	**Rice** (8-0)	Adams (3-8)	**Godfrey** (2)	ESPN+	393	30–3	6–0
Apr. 2	Georgia State		Dot Hicks Field • Huntington, WV	**W** 6–0	**Nester** (18-2)	Hodnett (4-8)	None	ESPN+	618	31–3	7–0
Apr. 7	at Louisiana–Monroe		Warhawk Field • Monroe, LA	**W** 13–2^{6}	**Nester** (19-2)	Abrams (4-8)	None	ESPN+	364	32–3	8–0
Apr. 8	at Louisiana–Monroe		Warhawk Field • Monroe, LA	**W** 4–3	**Rice** (9-0)	Chavarria (5-4)	**Nester** (1)	ESPN+	402	33–3	9–0
Apr. 8	at Louisiana–Monroe		Warhawk Field • Monroe, LA	**L** 3–5	Chavarria (6-4)	**Nester** (19-3)	None	ESPN+	402	33–4	9–1
Apr. 12	at Morehead State		University Field • Morehead, KY	**W** 4–2	**Rice** (10-0)	Begley (4-5)	None	ESPN+	72	34–4	
Apr. 14	at Coastal Carolina		St. John Stadium – Charles Wade-John Lott Field • Conway, SC	**L** 3–4	Picone (8-2)	**Nester** (19-4)	None	ESPN+	315	34–5	9–2
Apr. 15	at Coastal Carolina		St. John Stadium – Charles Wade-John Lott Field • Conway, SC	**W** 5–3	**Godfrey** (5-0)	Picone (8-3)	**Nester** (2)	ESPN+	312	35–5	10–2
Apr. 16	at Coastal Carolina		St. John Stadium – Charles Wade-John Lott Field • Conway, SC	**W** 3–2	**Nester** (20-4)	Brabham (10-7)	None	ESPN+	298	36–5	11–2
Apr. 18	No. 18 Alabama		Dot Hicks Field • Huntington, WV	**L** 1–3	Esman (4-2)	**Nester** (20-5)	Fouts (4)	ESPN+	2,768	36–6	
Apr. 21	James Madison		Dot Hicks Field • Huntington, WV	**W** 10–2^{6}	**Nester** (21-5)	Muh (4-2)	None	ESPN+	457	37–6	12–2
Apr. 22	James Madison		Dot Hicks Field • Huntington, WV	**L** 6–7	Muh (5-2)	**Godfrey** (5-1)	None	ESPN+	650	37–7	12–3
Apr. 23	James Madison		Dot Hicks Field • Huntington, WV	**W** 8–4	**Nester** (22-5)	Berry (9-3)	None	ESPN+	626	38–7	13–3
Apr. 25	No. 21 Virginia Tech		Dot Hicks Field • Huntington, WV	**W** 2–1	**Nester** (23-5)	Lemley (19-10)	None	ESPN+	1,064	39–7	
Apr. 28	Texas State		Dot Hicks Field • Huntington, WV	**L** 0–3	Mullins (17-9)	**Nester** (23-6)	None	ESPN+	293	39–8	13–4
Apr. 29	Texas State		Dot Hicks Field • Huntington, WV	**W** 2–1	**Rice** (11-0)	Glende (1-1)	**Nester** (3)	ESPN+	479	40–8	14–4
Apr. 30	Texas State		Dot Hicks Field • Huntington, WV	**L** 1–9^{6}	Mullins (19-9)	**Nester** (23-8)	None	ESPN+	393	40–9	14–5

May (3–0)
Date	Opponent	Rank	Site/stadium	Score	Win	Loss	Save	TV	Attendance	Overall record	SBC record
May 4	at Georgia Southern		Eagle Field at GS Softball Complex • Statesboro, GA	**W** 4–0	**Nester** (24-7)	Barnard (1-10)	None	ESPN+	238	41–9	15–5
May 5	at Georgia Southern		Eagle Field at GS Softball Complex • Statesboro, GA	**W** 7–2	**Rice** (12-0)	Belogorska (1-3)	**Feringa** (1)	ESPN+	249	42–9	16–5
May 6	at Georgia Southern		Eagle Field at GS Softball Complex • Statesboro, GA	**W** 8–1	**Nester** (25-7)	Belogorska (1-4)	None	ESPN+	254	43–9	17–5

Postseason (2–1)

SBC Tournament (2–1)
Date	Opponent	(Seed)/Rank	Site/stadium	Score	Win	Loss	Save	TV	Attendance	Overall record	Tournament record
May 11	vs. (7) Coastal Carolina	(2)	Yvette Girouard Field at Lamson Park • Lafayette, LA	**W** 2–1	**Nester** (26-7)	Brabham (12-12)	None	ESPN+		44–9	1–0
May 12	vs. (3) South Alabama	(2)	Yvette Girouard Field at Lamson Park • Lafayette, LA	**W** 3–2	**Nester** (27-7)	Hardy (17-8)	None	ESPN+	918	45–9	2–0
May 13	vs. (1) Louisiana	(2)	Yvette Girouard Field at Lamson Park • Lafayette, LA	**L** 0–1	Landry (17-4)	**Nester** (27-8)	None	ESPN+	1,574	45–10	2–1

Schedule source:

*Rankings are based on the team's current ranking in the NFCA/USA Softball poll.
