= 2023 Louisiana Ragin' Cajuns softball team =

American college softball season

2023 Louisiana Ragin' Cajuns softball

Sun Belt Conference Tournament champions Sun Belt Conference Regular season champions

NCAA Baton Rouge Regional champions NCAA Seattle Super Regional appearance
- Conference: Sun Belt Conference

Ranking
- Coaches: No. RV
- Record: 50–16 (22–2 SBC)
- Head coach: Gerry Glasco (6th season)
- Assistant coaches: Lacy Prejean; Justin Robichaux
- Home stadium: Yvette Girouard Field at Lamson Park

2023 Sun Belt Conference softball standings
	Conf.						Overall
Team	W		L		T	PCT	W		L		T	PCT
Louisiana ‍†‍‡‍^{y}	22	–	2	–	0	.917	47	–	14	–	0	.770
South Alabama ‍‍‍	20	–	4	–	0	.833	39	–	14	–	0	.736
Marshall ‍‍‍	17	–	5	–	0	.773	45	–	9	–	0	.833
Troy ‍‍‍	14	–	9	–	1	.604	33	–	19	–	1	.632
Texas State ‍‍‍^{y}	13	–	9	–	1	.587	34	–	23	–	1	.595
James Madison ‍‍‍	13	–	11	–	0	.542	28	–	19	–	0	.596
Coastal Carolina ‍‍‍	11	–	13	–	0	.458	36	–	20	–	0	.643
Louisiana-Monroe ‍‍‍	7	–	17	–	0	.292	25	–	32	–	0	.439
Georgia State ‍‍‍	7	–	17	–	0	.292	18	–	36	–	0	.333
Southern Miss ‍‍‍	6	–	17	–	0	.261	22	–	24	–	0	.478
Georgia Southern ‍‍‍	6	–	18	–	0	.250	17	–	34	–	0	.333
Appalachian State ‍‍‍	4	–	18	–	0	.182	23	–	28	–	0	.451
† – Conference champion ‡ – Tournament champion y – Invited to the NCAA tournament As of May 28, 2023; Rankings from NFCA/USA Today

The 2023 Louisiana Ragin' Cajuns softball team represented the University of Louisiana at Lafayette during the 2023 NCAA Division I softball season. The Ragin' Cajuns played their home games at Yvette Girouard Field at Lamson Park and were led by sixth-year head coach Gerry Glasco. They were members of the Sun Belt Conference.

After a close win in the finals of the Baton Rouge Regional over LSU, the Cajuns made it to the Super Regionals where they were shut out by Washington by a combined score of 0-10 over two games (the first time they have been shut out in Super Regional play in program history).

== Preseason ==
=== Sun Belt Conference Coaches Poll ===
The Sun Belt Conference Coaches Poll was released on February 2, 2023. Louisiana was picked to finish first in the conference with 144 votes and all first place votes (12).

Coaches poll
Predicted finish	Team	Votes (1st place)
1	Louisiana	144 (12)
2	Texas State	130
3	South Alabama	118
4	Troy	99
5	James Madison	93
6	Marshall	80
7	Southern Miss	68
8	Appalachian State	63
9	Louisiana–Monroe	44
10	Coastal Carolina	43
11	Georgia State; Georgia Southern	27

=== Preseason All-Sun Belt team ===
- Jessica Mullins (Pitcher, TXST)
- Olivia Lackie (Pitcher, USA)
- Sophie Piskos (Pitcher, LA)
- Hannah Shifflett (1st Base, JMU)
- Stormy Kotzelnick (1st Base, LA)
- Kelly Horne (2nd Base, TXST)
- Alexa Langeliers (Shortstop, LA)
- Jourdyn Campbell (3rd Base, LA)
- Sara Vanderford (3rd Base, TXST)
- Karly Heath (Designated Player, LA)
- Iyanla De Jesus (Designated Player, CCU)
- Ciara Trahan (Outfielder, TXST)
- Maddie Hayden (Outfielder, LA)
- Mackenzie Brasher (Outfielder, USA)
- Kayt Houston (Outfielder, APP)

== Personnel ==
2023 Louisiana Ragin' Cajuns softball team
Players
Coaches

#	Pos.	Name	Bats/throws	Height	Year	Home town
3	OF	Maddie Hayden	L/R	5 ft 4 in (1.63 m)	So	West Monroe, Louisiana
4	C	Victoria Valdez	R/R	5 ft 4 in (1.63 m)	Fr	Alvin, Texas
7	RHP	Karly Heath	L/R	5 ft 10 in (1.78 m)	Sr	North Augusta, South Carolina
8	INF	Taylor Roman	R/R	6 ft 0 in (1.83 m)	So	Missouri City, Texas
9		Cecilia Vasquez	R/R	5 ft 6 in (1.68 m)	Fr	New Waverly, Texas
10	OF	Kramer Eschete	L/R	5 ft 6 in (1.68 m)	So	Brenham, Texas
11		Lauren Allred	L/R	5 ft 9 in (1.75 m)	Fr	Texarkana, Texas
12	RHP	Sam Landry	R/R	5 ft 10 in (1.78 m)	So	Mont Belvieu, Texas
13	INF	Jourdyn Campbell	R/R	5 ft 8 in (1.73 m)	Jr	Kingwood, Texas
14	RHP	Meghan Schorman	R/R	5 ft 7 in (1.7 m)	Sr	Hazelwood, Missouri
15	INF	Laney Credeur	L/R	5 ft 4 in (1.63 m)	So	Old Mines, Missouri
16	RHP	Tyler Oubre (redshirt)	R/R	5 ft 10 in (1.78 m)	Fr	Destrehan, Louisiana
17	RHP	Kyleigh Pitzer	R/R	6 ft 0 in (1.83 m)	Fr	Mount Juliet, Tennessee
19	C	Sophie Piskos	R/R	5 ft 4 in (1.63 m)	Jr	Paris, Tennessee
22	INF	Stormy Kotzelnick	L/R	5 ft 3 in (1.6 m)	So	Carmel, Indiana
23	INF	Alexa Langeliers	R/R	5 ft 7 in (1.7 m)	So	Keller, Texas
25	RHP	Chloe Riassetto	L/L	5 ft 6 in (1.68 m)	Fr	Friendswood, Texas
29	OF	Kayla Falterman	L/R	5 ft 4 in (1.63 m)	So	The Woodlands, Texas
33	OF	Samantha Graeter	R/R	5 ft 7 in (1.7 m)	So	Spring, Texas
35		Kylei Griffin	R/R	5 ft 9 in (1.75 m)	Fr	Tyler, Texas
42	OF	Mihyia Davis	L/R	5 ft 5 in (1.65 m)	Fr	Lovelady, Texas
53	RHP	Kandra Lamb	R/R	6 ft 2 in (1.88 m)	Sr	Kurrajong, Australia

Head coach

Gerry Glasco (Illinois)

Assistant coach(es)

Lacy Prejean (Alabama)
Justin Robichaux (Louisiana)
Kevin Meyers (St. Francis)

Legend

- (C) Team captain
- (S) Suspended
- (I) Ineligible
- Injured
- Current redshirt

Roster
Last update: 8 April 2023

== Schedule and results ==
Legend
	Louisiana win
	Louisiana loss
	Postponement/Cancellation
**Bold**	Louisiana team member

2023 Louisiana Ragin' Cajuns softball game log
Regular season (43–13)

February (10–6)
Date	Opponent	Rank	Site/stadium	Score	Win	Loss	Save	TV	Attendance	Overall record	SBC record
Louisiana Classics
Feb. 10	Lafayette	RV	Yvette Girouard Field at Lamson Park • Lafayette, LA	**W** 12–0^{5}	**Landry** (1-0)	Powell (0-1)	Non	ESPN+	1,719	1–0	
Feb. 11	Stephen F. Austin	RV	Yvette Girouard Field at Lamson Park • Lafayette, LA	**W** 12–1^{5}	**Schorman** (1-0)	Telford (1-1)	None	ESPN+	1,207	2–0	
Feb. 11	Lafayette	RV	Yvette Girouard Field at Lamson Park • Lafayette, LA	**W** 6–0	**Lamb** (1-0)	Cal (0-2)	None	ESPN+	1,207	3–0	
Feb. 12	Stephen F. Austin	RV	Yvette Girouard Field at Lamson Park • Lafayette, LA	**W** 12–0^{5}	**Landry** (2-0)	Hannabas (1-1)	None	ESPN+	1,618	4–0	
TaxAct Clearwater Invitational
Feb. 16	vs. Indiana	RV	Eddie C. Moore Complex • Clearwater, FL	**W** 4–1	**Schorman** (2-0)	Johnson (1-2)	**Lamb** (1)	ESPNU	358	5–0	
Feb. 17	vs. No. 25 Michigan	RV	Eddie C. Moore Complex • Clearwater, FL	**L** 6–7	LeBeau (3-0)	**Landry** (2-1)	Derkowski (1)	ESPN+	657	5–1	
Feb. 18	vs. No. 5 Oklahoma State	RV	Eddie C. Moore Complex • Clearwater, FL	**L** 2–12^{5}	Maxwell (4-0)	**Schorman** (2-1)	None	ESPN+	882	5–2	
Feb. 18	vs. No. 4 Arkansas	RV	Eddie C. Moore Complex • Clearwater, FL	**L** 6–7	Delce (3-1)	**Landry** (2-2)	None	ESPN+	733	5–3	
Feb. 19	vs. No. 2 UCLA	RV	Eddie C. Moore Complex • Clearwater, FL	**L** 3–4	Faraimo (7-0)	**Schorman** (2-2)	None	ESPNU	1,032	5–4	
Feb. 19	vs. No. 6 Florida State	RV	Eddie C. Moore Complex • Clearwater, FL	**L** 2–10^{6}	Royalty (2-0)	**Landry** (2-3)	Leonard (1)	ESPN+	1,221	5–5	
Feb. 21	No. 23 UCF		UCF Softball Complex • Orlando, FL	**W** 8–0^{5}	**Schorman** (3-2)	Willis (0-1)	None	ESPN+	489	6–5	
LSU Crossover
Feb. 25	vs. Texas A&M–Corpus Christi	RV	Tiger Park • Baton Rouge, LA	**W** 5–2	**Landry** (3-3)	Aholelei (4-4)	**Riassetto** (1)		325	7–5	
Feb. 25	at No. 15 LSU	RV	Tiger Park • Baton Rouge, LA	**W** 5–4	**Schorman** (4-2)	Chaffin (2-1)	**Riassetto** (2)	SECN+	2,447	8–5	
Feb. 26	Texas A&M–Corpus Christi	RV	Yvette Girouard Field at Lamson Park • Lafayette, LA	**W** 2–0	**Heath** (1-0)	Aholelei (4-5)	**Riassetto** (1)	ESPN+	2,403	9–5	
Feb. 26	No. 15 LSU	RV	Yvette Girouard Field at Lamson Park • Lafayette, LA	**L** 1–4	Kilponen (4-0)	**Landry** (3-4)	None	ESPN+	2,403	9–6	
Feb. 27	vs. Ole Miss	RV	Yvette Girouard Field at Lamson Park • Lafayette, LA	**W** 3–2^{8}	**Landry** (4-4)	Furbush (4-4)	None	ESPN+	1,668	10–6	

March (14–4)
Date	Opponent	Rank	Site/stadium	Score	Win	Loss	Save	TV	Attendance	Overall record	SBC record
Longhorn Invitational
Mar. 3	vs. McNeese	RV	Red and Charline McCombs Field • Austin, TX	**W** 7–1	**Landry** (5-4)	Tate (4-1)	None		1,590	11–6	
Mar. 3	at No. 9 Texas	RV	Red and Charline McCombs Field • Austin, TX	**L** 2–6	Gutierrez (4-1)	**Schorman** (4-3)	None	LHN	1,590	11–7	
Mar. 4	vs. Tennessee State	RV	Red and Charline McCombs Field • Austin, TX	**W** 9–1^{6}	**Schorman** (5-3)	Manus (7-6)	None			12–7	
Mar. 4	vs. Princeton	RV	Red and Charline McCombs Field • Austin, TX	**W** 8–3	**Landry** (6-4)	Chambers (1-3)	None	ESPN+		13–7	
Mar. 5	at No. 9 Texas	RV	Red and Charline McCombs Field • Austin, TX	**L** 3–8	Gutierrez (5-1)	**Riassetto** (0-1)	None	LHN	1,571	13–8	
Mar. 8	McNeese	RV	Yvette Girouard Field at Lamson Park • Lafayette, LA	**W** 6–2	**Riassetto** (1-1)	Vallejo (4-6)	None		1,522	14–8	
Bubly Invitational
Mar. 10	vs. Rutgers	RV	Katie Seashole Pressly Softball Stadium • Gainesville, FL	**W** 3–0	**Lamb** (2-0)	Vickers (4-3)	**Riassetto** (3)			15–8	
Mar. 11	at No. 8 Florida	RV	Katie Seashole Pressly Softball Stadium • Gainesville, FL	**W** 1–0	**Schorman** (6-3)	Delbrey (3-1)	None	SECN+	2,046	16–8	
Mar. 11	vs. Rutgers	RV	Katie Seashole Pressly Softball Stadium • Gainesville, FL	**W** 5–0	**Heath** (2-0)	Smith (2-2)	None			17–8	
Mar. 12	vs. Mercer	RV	Katie Seashole Pressly Softball Stadium • Gainesville, FL	**W** 3–2	**Lamb** (3-0)	Rearley (2-5)	None			18–8	
Mar. 12	at No. 8 Florida	RV	Katie Seashole Pressly Softball Stadium • Gainesville, FL	**L** 2–11^{5}	Hightower (9-2)	**Schorman** (6-4)	None	SECN+		18–9	
Mar. 18	at Southern Miss	RV	Southern Miss Softball Complex • Hattiesburg, MS	**W** 8–4	**Schorman** (7-4)	Leinstock (8-6)	None	ESPN+	708	19–9	1–0
Mar. 18	at Southern Miss	RV	Southern Miss Softball Complex • Hattiesburg, MS	**W** 12–1^{6}	**Landry** (7-4)	Lee (3-2)	None	ESPN+	708	20–9	2–0
Mar. 19	at Southern Miss	RV	Southern Miss Softball Complex • Hattiesburg, MS	**W** 10–2^{6}	**Schorman** (8-4)	Leinstock (8-7)	None	ESPN+		21–9	3–0
Mar. 24	Appalachian State	No. 25	Yvette Girouard Field at Lamson Park • Lafayette, LA	**W** 8–0^{5}	**Heath** (3-0)	Buckner (3-3)	None	ESPN+	1,085	22–9	4–0
Mar. 25	Appalachian State	No. 25	Yvette Girouard Field at Lamson Park • Lafayette, LA	**W** 4–0	**Schorman** (9-4)	Northrop (6-3)	None	ESPN+	1,539	23–9	5–0
Mar. 25	Appalachian State	No. 25	Yvette Girouard Field at Lamson Park • Lafayette, LA	**L** 3–5	Neas (6-2)	**Lamb** (3-1)	Buckner (1)	ESPN+	1,539	23–10	5–1
Mar. 31	at James Madison	RV	Veterans Memorial Park • Harrisonburg, VA	**W** 8–4^{8}	**Schorman** (10-4)	Humphrey (8-5)	None	ESPN+	487	24–10	6–1

April (15–3)
Date	Opponent	Rank	Site/stadium	Score	Win	Loss	Save	TV	Attendance	Overall record	SBC record
Apr. 1	at James Madison	RV	Veterans Memorial Park • Harrisonburg, VA	**W** 9–2	**Landry** (8-4)	Berry (8-1)	None		663	25–10	7–1
Apr. 2	at James Madison	RV	Veterans Memorial Park • Harrisonburg, VA	**W** 6–2	**Lamb** (4-1)	Humphrey (8-6)	None	ESPN+	589	26–10	8–1
Apr. 4	at McNeese	RV	Joe Miller Field at Cowgirl Diamond • Lake Charles, LA	**W** 7–0	**Landry** (9-4)	Tate (12-3)	None	ESPN+	837	27–10	
Apr. 8	South Alabama	RV	Yvette Girouard Field at Lamson Park • Lafayette, LA	**W** 7–5	**Schorman** (11-4)	Lackie (13-5)	None	ESPN+	1,398	28–10	9–1
Apr. 8	South Alabama	RV	Yvette Girouard Field at Lamson Park • Lafayette, LA	**W** 8–0^{5}	**Landry** (10-4)	Hardy (11-7)	None	ESPN+	1,398	29–10	10–1
Apr. 9	South Alabama	RV	Yvette Girouard Field at Lamson Park • Lafayette, LA	**W** 2–0	**Landry** (11-4)	Lackie (13-6)	**Lamb** (2)	ESPN+	1,004	30–10	11–1
Apr. 11	at No. 18 Baylor	RV	Getterman Stadium • Waco, TX	**L** 1–2	Orme (13-4)	**Landry** (11-5)	None	ESPN+	763	30–11	
Apr. 12	at No. 23 Texas A&M	RV	Davis Diamond • College Station, TX	**L** 2–4	Kennedy (8-3)	**Heath** (3-1)	None	SECN+	1,333	30–12	
Apr. 14	Texas State	RV	Yvette Girouard Field at Lamson Park • Lafayette, LA	**W** 5–3	**Schorman** (12-5)	Mullins (14-8)	**Lamb** (3)	ESPN+	1,651	31–12	12–1
Apr. 15	Texas State	RV	Yvette Girouard Field at Lamson Park • Lafayette, LA	**W** 4–2	**Lamb** (5-1)	McCann (6-6)	None	ESPN+	1,753	32–12	13–1
Apr. 16	Texas State	RV	Yvette Girouard Field at Lamson Park • Lafayette, LA	**W** 7–0	**Landry** (12-4)	Pierce (5-3)	None	ESPN+	1,602	33–12	14–1
Apr. 18	Southeastern Louisiana	RV	Yvette Girouard Field at Lamson Park • Lafayette, LA	**W** 7–0	**Lamb** (6-1)	Comeaux (8-3)	None	ESPN+	1,338	34–12	
Apr. 21	at Troy	RV	Troy Softball Complex • Troy, AL	**L** 7–8	Baker (2-1)	**Schorman** (12-6)	None	ESPN+	462	34–13	14–2
Apr. 22	at Troy	RV	Troy Softball Complex • Troy, AL	**W** 9–2	**Schorman** (13-6)	Johnson (22-6)	None	ESPN+	698	35–13	15–2
Apr. 23	at Troy	RV	Troy Softball Complex • Troy, AL	**W** 6–1	**Landry** (13-4)	Baker (2-2)	None	ESPN+	429	36–13	16–2
Apr. 28	at Coastal Carolina	RV	St. John Stadium – Charles Wade-John Lott Field • Conway, SC	**W** 11–0^{6}	**Landry** (14-4)	Brabham (11-9)	None	ESPN+	250	37–13	17–2
Apr. 29	at Coastal Carolina	RV	St. John Stadium – Charles Wade-John Lott Field • Conway, SC	**W** 2–1	**Lamb** (7-1)	Brabham (11-10)	None	ESPN+	292	38–13	18–2
Apr. 30	at Coastal Carolina	RV	St. John Stadium – Charles Wade-John Lott Field • Conway, SC	**W** 10–6	**Heath** (4-1)	Picone (9-4)	**Schorman** (1)	ESPN+	292	39–13	19–2

May (4–0)
Date	Opponent	Rank	Site/stadium	Score	Win	Loss	Save	TV	Attendance	Overall record	SBC record
May 3	at Louisiana Tech	RV	Dr. Billy Bundrick Stadium • Ruston, LA	**W** 8–1	**Landry** (15-4)	Floyd (8-8)	**Lamb** (4)	CUSA.TV	726	40–13	
May 4	Louisiana–Monroe	RV	Yvette Girouard Field at Lamson Park • Lafayette, LA	**W** 5–1	**Schorman** (14-6)	Nichols (2-2)	None	ESPN+	1,512	41–13	20–2
May 5	Louisiana–Monroe	RV	Yvette Girouard Field at Lamson Park • Lafayette, LA	**W** 9–0^{5}	**Heath** (5-1)	Abrams (6-12)	None	ESPN+	1,776	42–13	21–2
May 6	Louisiana–Monroe	RV	Yvette Girouard Field at Lamson Park • Lafayette, LA	**W** 9–1^{5}	**Lamb** (8-1)	Abrams (6-13)	None	ESPN+	1,656	43–13	22–2

Postseason (7–3)

SBC Tournament (3–0)
Date	Opponent	(Seed)/Rank	Site/stadium	Score	Win	Loss	Save	TV	Attendance	Overall record	Tournament record
May 11	(8) Louisiana–Monroe	(1)/RV	Yvette Girouard Field at Lamson Park • Lafayette, LA	**W** 3–1	**Landry** (16-4)	Hulett (8-5)	None	ESPN+	1,426	44–13	1–0
May 12	(5) Texas State	(1)/RV	Yvette Girouard Field at Lamson Park • Lafayette, LA	**W** 4–1	**Lamb** (9-1)	Mullins (21-11)	None	ESPN+	1,458	45–13	2–0
May 13	(2) Marshall	(1)/RV	Yvette Girouard Field at Lamson Park • Lafayette, LA	**W** 1–0	**Landry** (17-4)	Nester (27-8)	None	ESPN+	1,574	46–13	3–0

NCAA Division I softball tournament (4–3)
Date	Opponent	(Seed)/Rank	Site/stadium	Score	Win	Loss	Save	TV	Attendance	Overall record	Tournament record
Baton Rouge Regionals
May 19	vs. (3) Omaha	(2)/RV	Tiger Park • Baton Rouge, LA	**W** 5–0	**Landry** (18-4)	Meyer (17-8)	None	ESPN+		47–13	1–0
May 20	at (1)/No. 11 LSU	(2)/RV	Tiger Park • Baton Rouge, LA	**L** 0–4	Berzon (14-7)	**Landry** (18-5)	None	ESPN+	2,179	47–14	1–1
May 20	vs. (3) Omaha	(2)/RV	Tiger Park • Baton Rouge, LA	**W** 9–0^{5}	**Lamb** (10-1)	Nuismer (13-8)	None	ESPN+	1,857	48–14	2–1
May 21	at (1)/No. 11 LSU	(2)/RV	Tiger Park • Baton Rouge, LA	**W** 7–4	**Landry** (19-5)	Johnson (7-1)	None	ESPN+	2,120	49–14	3–1
May 21	at (1)/No. 11 LSU	(2)/RV	Tiger Park • Baton Rouge, LA	**W** 9–8	**Riassetto** (2-1)	Berzon (14-8)	None	ESPN+	2,166	50–14	4–1
Seattle Super Regionals
May 26	at No. 6 Washington	RV	Husky Softball Stadium • Seattle, WA	**L** 0–8^{5}	Meylan (18-5)	**Landry** (19-6)	None	ESPN	2,200	50–15	0–1
May 27	at No. 6 Washington	RV	Husky Softball Stadium • Seattle, WA	**L** 0–2	Lopez (13-3)	**Schorman** (14-7)	Meylan (7)	ESPN	2,266	50–16	0–2

Schedule source:

*Rankings are based on the team's current ranking in the NFCA/USA Softball poll.

== Baton Rouge Regional ==
Baton Rouge Regional Teams
(1) LSU Tigers	(2) Louisiana Ragin' Cajuns	(3) Omaha Mavericks	(4) Prairie View A&M Panthers

First Round
10	(10) LSU	12^{(5)}
Prairie View A&M	2
Louisiana	5
Omaha	0
Lower round 1
Prairie View A&M	0
Omaha	3

Semi-Finals
10	LSU	4
Louisiana	0
Lower final
Louisiana	9^{(5)}
Omaha	0

Finals
10	LSU	4	8
Louisiana	7	9

== Seattle Super Regional ==
Seattle Super Regional Teams
(7) Washington Huskies	Louisiana Ragin' Cajuns

Game 1
Rank	Team	Score
	Louisiana	0
7	Washington	8^{5}

Game 2
Rank	Team	Score
	Louisiana	0
7	Washington	2

== Rankings ==
Ranking movements Legend: ██ Increase in ranking ██ Decrease in ranking — = Not ranked RV = Received votes
	Week															
Poll	Pre	1	2	3	4	5	6	7	8	9	10	11	12	13	14	Final
NFCA / USA Today	RV	RV	RV	RV	RV	RV	25	RV	RV	RV	RV	RV	RV	RV		
Softball America	22	20	—	—	—	—	—	—	—	23	—	—	—	—		
ESPN.com/USA Softball	24	22	RV	24	24	23	23	25	RV	25	25	25	24	24		
D1Softball	20	21	—	—	—	—	24	—	—	25	—	—	—	—		
