= 2023 South Alabama Jaguars softball team =

American college softball season

2023 South Alabama Jaguars softball
- Conference: Sun Belt Conference
- Record: 39–14 (20–4 SBC)
- Head coach: Becky Clark (17th season)
- Assistant coaches: Kristina McCain; Hannah Campbell
- Home stadium: Jaguar Field

2023 Sun Belt Conference softball standings
| | Conf. | | | | | | Overall |
| Team | W | | L | | T | PCT | W | | L | | T | PCT |
|---|---|---|---|---|---|---|---|---|---|---|---|---|
| Louisiana ‍†‍‡‍^{y} | 22 | – | 2 | – | 0 | .917 | 47 | – | 14 | – | 0 | .770 |
| South Alabama ‍‍‍ | 20 | – | 4 | – | 0 | .833 | 39 | – | 14 | – | 0 | .736 |
| Marshall ‍‍‍ | 17 | – | 5 | – | 0 | .773 | 45 | – | 9 | – | 0 | .833 |
| Troy ‍‍‍ | 14 | – | 9 | – | 1 | .604 | 33 | – | 19 | – | 1 | .632 |
| Texas State ‍‍‍^{y} | 13 | – | 9 | – | 1 | .587 | 34 | – | 23 | – | 1 | .595 |
| James Madison ‍‍‍ | 13 | – | 11 | – | 0 | .542 | 28 | – | 19 | – | 0 | .596 |
| Coastal Carolina ‍‍‍ | 11 | – | 13 | – | 0 | .458 | 36 | – | 20 | – | 0 | .643 |
| Louisiana-Monroe ‍‍‍ | 7 | – | 17 | – | 0 | .292 | 25 | – | 32 | – | 0 | .439 |
| Georgia State ‍‍‍ | 7 | – | 17 | – | 0 | .292 | 18 | – | 36 | – | 0 | .333 |
| Southern Miss ‍‍‍ | 6 | – | 17 | – | 0 | .261 | 22 | – | 24 | – | 0 | .478 |
| Georgia Southern ‍‍‍ | 6 | – | 18 | – | 0 | .250 | 17 | – | 34 | – | 0 | .333 |
| Appalachian State ‍‍‍ | 4 | – | 18 | – | 0 | .182 | 23 | – | 28 | – | 0 | .451 |
† – Conference champion ‡ – Tournament champion y – Invited to the NCAA tournament As of May 28, 2023; Rankings from NFCA/USA Today

The 2023 South Alabama Jaguars softball team represented the University of South Alabama during the 2023 NCAA Division I softball season. The Jaguars played their home games at Jaguar Field. The Jaguars were led by seventeenth-year head coach Becky Clark and were members of the Sun Belt Conference.

== Preseason ==
=== Sun Belt Conference Coaches Poll ===
The Sun Belt Conference Coaches Poll was released on February 2, 2023. South Alabama was picked to finish third in the conference with 118 votes.

Coaches poll
| Predicted finish | Team | Votes (1st place) |
| 1 | Louisiana | 144 (12) |
| 2 | Texas State | 130 |
| 3 | South Alabama | 118 |
| 4 | Troy | 99 |
| 5 | James Madison | 93 |
| 6 | Marshall | 80 |
| 7 | Southern Miss | 68 |
| 8 | Appalachian State | 63 |
| 9 | Louisiana–Monroe | 44 |
| 10 | Coastal Carolina | 43 |
| 11 | Georgia State; Georgia Southern | 27 |

=== Preseason All-Sun Belt team ===
- Jessica Mullins (Pitcher, TXST)
- Olivia Lackie (Pitcher, USA)
- Sophie Piskos (Pitcher, LA)
- Hannah Shifflett (1st Base, JMU)
- Stormy Kotzelnick (1st Base, LA)
- Kelly Horne (2nd Base, TXST)
- Alexa Langeliers (Shortstop, LA)
- Jourdyn Campbell (3rd Base, LA)
- Sara Vanderford (3rd Base, TXST)
- Karly Heath (Designated Player, LA)
- Iyanla De Jesus (Designated Player, CCU)
- Ciara Trahan (Outfielder, TXST)
- Maddie Hayden (Outfielder, LA)
- Mackenzie Brasher (Outfielder, USA)
- Kayt Houston (Outfielder, APP)

=== National Softball Signing Day ===
| Player | Position | Hometown | Previous Team |
|---|---|---|---|
| Olivia Bransetter | Infielder | Liberty, Missouri | Liberty HS |
| Caitlyn Gavin | Infielder | Jay, Florida | Jay HS |
| Ryley Harrison | Pitcher | Fairhope, Alabama | Fairhope HS |
| Emily Mizelle | Infielder | Mobile, Alabama | Baker HS |
| Molly Pitts | Catcher | Mobile, Alabama | Mobile Christian School |
| Amity White | Outfielder | Brundidge, Alabama | Pike County HS |
| Cadence Williams | Pitcher | Rising Sun, Maryland | Rising Sun HS |

== Personnel ==
2023 South Alabama Jaguars softball team
Players
Coaches

| # | Pos. | Name | Bats/throws | Height | Year | Home town |
|---|---|---|---|---|---|---|
| 0 | INF | Meredith Keel | L/R | 5 ft 4 in (1.63 m) | Sr | Ashville, Ohio |
| 2 | OF | Erin McGlothlin (redshirt) | L/R | 5 ft 6 in (1.68 m) | Fr | Homestead, Florida |
| 3 | U | Emma Kropp | R/R | 5 ft 9 in (1.75 m) | Sr | Fairhope, Alabama |
| 4 | OF | Brooklynn Bockhaus | R/R | 5 ft 7 in (1.7 m) | Fr | Haughton, Louisiana |
| 6 | U | Abby Allen | R/R | 5 ft 4 in (1.63 m) | Jr | Monroe, Louisiana |
| 8 | LHP | Rachel Everett (redshirt) | L/L | 5 ft 8 in (1.73 m) | Fr | Hartland, Michigan |
| 9 | U | Stephanie Gonzalez | R/R | 5 ft 5 in (1.65 m) | So | Pembroke Pines, Florida |
| 11 | INF | Marley Sims | L/R | 5 ft 2 in (1.57 m) | Jr | Gulfport, Mississippi |
| 12 | OF | Victoria Ortiz (redshirt) | L/L | 5 ft 6 in (1.68 m) | Sr | Mobile, Alabama |
| 13 | INF | Gabby Stagner | R/R | 5 ft 8 in (1.73 m) | So | Mobile, Alabama |
| 14 | OF | Bailey Welch | L/R | 5 ft 6 in (1.68 m) | Jr | Hueytown, Alabama |
| 18 | OF | Mackenzie Brasher | L/R | 5 ft 6 in (1.68 m) | Sr | Orange Beach, Alabama |
| 19 | C | Sasha Willems | R/R | 5 ft 4 in (1.63 m) | Jr | Sydney, Australia |
| 21 | U | Hannah Ogea (redshirt) | R/R | 5 ft 7 in (1.7 m) | So | Baton Rouge, Louisiana |
| 22 | RHP | Madison Lagle | L/R | 5 ft 11 in (1.8 m) | Fr | Glen St. Mary, Florida |
| 24 | INF | Shelby Garrett (redshirt) | R/R | 5 ft 6 in (1.68 m) | Fr | Frostproof, Florida |
| 27 | INF | Odalys Cordova (redshirt) | R/R | 5 ft 4 in (1.63 m) | Jr | Orlando, Florida |
| 28 | LHP | Kaitlyn Hughes | L/L | 5 ft 8 in (1.73 m) | Jr | Trussville, Alabama |
| 35 | RHP | Jenna Hardy | R/R | 6 ft 2 in (1.88 m) | Sr | Whitehouse, Ohio |
| 44 | INF | Marlayna Capaldi | R/R | 5 ft 5 in (1.65 m) | Fr | Wilmington, Delaware |
| 66 | C | Sophia Mendoza | R/R | 5 ft 7 in (1.7 m) | Fr | Lehigh Acres, Florida |
| 99 | RHP | Olivia Lackie | R/R | 6 ft 0 in (1.83 m) | Jr | Walker, Louisiana |

Head coach

Becky Clark (Mobile)

Assistant coach(es)

Kristina McCain (Auburn)
Hannah Campbell (South Alabama)
Jayden Mount (Louisiana–Monroe)

Legend

- (C) Team captain
- (S) Suspended
- (I) Ineligible
- Injured
- Current redshirt

Roster
Last update: 29 May 2023

== Schedule and results ==
Legend
| | South Alabama win |
| | South Alabama loss |
| | Postponement/Cancellation/Suspensions |
| **Bold** | South Alabama team member |

2023 South Alabama Jaguars softball game log
Regular season (38–13)

February (9–6)
| Date | Opponent | Rank | Site/stadium | Score | Win | Loss | Save | TV | Attendance | Overall record | SBC record |
NFCA Leadoff Classic
| Feb. 10 | vs. Louisville | | Eddie C. Moore Complex • Clearwater, FL | **L** 2–4^{8} | Zabala (1-0) | **Lackie** (0-1) | None | | 556 | 0–1 | |
| Feb. 10 | vs. No. 8 Northwestern | | Eddie C. Moore Complex • Clearwater, FL | **L** 5–8 | Henry (1-0) | **Lackie** (0-2) | Boyd (1) | | 476 | 0–2 | |
| Feb. 11 | vs. St. John's | | Eddie C. Moore Complex • Clearwater, FL | **W** 5–3 | **Hardy** (1-0) | Serafinko (0-1) | None | | 435 | 1–2 | |
| Feb. 11 | vs. No. 13 Tennessee | | Eddie C. Moore Complex • Clearwater, FL | Game cancelled | | | | | | | |
| Feb. 12 | vs. Indiana | | Eddie C. Moore Complex • Clearwater, FL | **L** 1–5 | Montgomery (1-0) | **Hardy** (1-1) | Johnson (1) | | 223 | 1–3 | |
Mardi Gras Classic
| Feb. 17 | Missouri State | | Jaguar Field • Mobile, AL | **L** 1–3 | Johnston (1-1) | **Hardy** (0-2) | None | | 429 | 1–4 | |
| Feb. 17 | Mississippi Valley State | | Jaguar Field • Mobile, AL | **W** 9–0^{5} | **Lackie** (1-2) | Guiterrez (0-3) | None | | 429 | 2–4 | |
| Feb. 18 | Missouri State | | Jaguar Field • Mobile, AL | **W** 10–0^{5} | **Lackie** (2-2) | Houchlei (0-2) | None | | 487 | 3–4 | |
| Feb. 18 | Rutgers | | Jaguar Field • Mobile, AL | **W** 4–1 | **Hardy** (2-2) | Smith (1-1) | None | | 487 | 4–4 | |
| Feb. 19 | Rutgers | | Jaguar Field • Mobile, AL | **W** 4–0 | **Lackie** (3-2) | Vickers (2-1) | **Hardy** (1) | | 369 | 5–4 | |
| Feb. 21 | at McNeese | | Joe Miller Field at Cowgirl Diamond • Lake Charles, LA | **W** 3–0 | **Lackie** (1-2) | Vallejo (1-3) | None | | 621 | 6–4 | |
South Alabama Invitational
| Feb. 23 | Tulsa | | Jaguar Field • Mobile, AL | **L** 2–4 | Nash (3-1) | **Hardy** (2-3) | None | | 326 | 6–5 | |
| Feb. 24 | Furman | | Jaguar Field • Mobile, AL | **W** 3–2 | **Hardy** (3-3) | Tufts (3-3) | None | | 437 | 7–5 | |
| Feb. 24 | RV Mississippi State | | Jaguar Field • Mobile, AL | **L** 4–8 | Wesley (2-1) | **Lackie** (4-3) | None | | 437 | 7–6 | |
| Feb. 25 | Tulsa | | Jaguar Field • Mobile, AL | **W** 5–3 | **Hardy** (4-3) | Moore (4-2) | None | | 430 | 8–6 | |
| Feb. 26 | Louisiana Tech | | Jaguar Field • Mobile, AL | **W** 2–0 | **Lackie** (5-3) | Floyd (2-1) | None | | 527 | 9–6 | |

March (14–4)
| Date | Opponent | Rank | Site/stadium | Score | Win | Loss | Save | TV | Attendance | Overall record | SBC record |
Jane B. Moore Memorial
| Mar. 3 | vs. Tennessee Tech | | Jane B. Moore Field • Auburn, AL | **W** 9–0^{6} | **Lackie** (6-3) | Piper (1-6) | None | | 1,547 | 10–6 | |
| Mar. 3 | at No. 19 Auburn | | Jane B. Moore Field • Auburn, AL | **L** 0–3 | Penta (10-0) | **Hardy** (4-4) | None | | 1,547 | 10–7 | |
| Mar. 4 | vs. Bowling Green | | Jane B. Moore Field • Auburn, AL | **W** 12–0^{5} | **Hardy** (5-4) | Anderson (4-1) | None | | 1,720 | 11–7 | |
| Mar. 4 | at No. 19 Auburn | | Jane B. Moore Field • Auburn, AL | **W** 2–1 | **Lackie** (7-3) | Lowe (2-1) | None | | 1,720 | 12–7 | |
| Mar. 5 | vs. Tennessee Tech | | Jane B. Moore Field • Auburn, AL | **W** 8–0^{5} | **Hardy** (6-4) | Cole (0-6) | None | | 1,589 | 13–7 | |
THE Spring Games
| Mar. 10 | vs. Chattanooga | | ROC Park • Madiera Beach, FL | **W** 1–0 | **Hardy** (7-4) | Parrott (2-2) | None | | 123 | 14–7 | |
| Mar. 10 | vs. Iowa | | ROC Park • Madiera Beach, FL | **L** 2–4 | Adams (4-4) | **Lackie** (7-4) | Loecker (2) | | 189 | 14–8 | |
| Mar. 11 | vs. Lehigh | | ROC Park • Madiera Beach, FL | **L** 1–3 | Young (6-0) | **Hardy** (7-5) | None | | 224 | 14–9 | |
| Mar. 11 | vs. Iona | | ROC Park • Madiera Beach, FL | **W** 11–0^{5} | **Lackie** (8-4) | Beckham (0-2) | None | | 269 | 15–9 | |
| Mar. 12 | vs. Princeton | | ROC Park • Madiera Beach, FL | **W** 3–2 | **Hardy** (8-5) | Laudenslager (1-6) | **Lackie** (1) | | 123 | 16–9 | |
| Mar. 18 | Georgia State | | Jaguar Field • Mobile, AL | **W** 8–0^{6} | **Lackie** (9-4) | Doolittle (5-2) | None | ESPN+ | 504 | 17–9 | 1–0 |
| Mar. 18 | Georgia State | | Jaguar Field • Mobile, AL | **W** 4–3 | **Hardy** (9-5) | Adams (2-5) | None | ESPN+ | 504 | 18–9 | 2–0 |
| Mar. 19 | Georgia State | | Jaguar Field • Mobile, AL | **W** 9–5 | **Hardy** (10-5) | Adams (2-6) | None | ESPN+ | 332 | 19–9 | 3–0 |
| Mar. 21 | at Nicholls | | Swanner Field at Geo Surfaces Park • Thibodaux, LA | **W** 5–2 | **Lagle** (1-0) | McNeill (7-4) | **Hardy** (2) | ESPN+ | 103 | 20–9 | |
| Mar. 24 | at Texas State | | Bobcat Softball Stadium • San Marcos, TX | **W** 2–1 | **Lackie** (10-4) | Mullins (11-7) | None | ESPN+ | 417 | 21–9 | 4–0 |
| Mar. 25 | at Texas State | | Bobcat Softball Stadium • San Marcos, TX | **L** 2–6 | Pierce (4-2) | **Hardy** (10-6) | None | ESPN+ | 536 | 21–10 | 4–1 |
| Mar. 26 | at Texas State | | Bobcat Softball Stadium • San Marcos, TX | **W** 7–0 | **Lackie** (11-4) | McCann (4-3) | None | ESPN+ | 547 | 22–10 | 5–1 |
| Mar. 31 | Louisiana–Monroe | | Jaguar Field • Mobile, AL | **W** 6–0 | **Lackie** (12-4) | Nichols (1-1) | None | ESPN+ | 437 | 23–10 | 6–1 |

April (12–3)
| Date | Opponent | Rank | Site/stadium | Score | Win | Loss | Save | TV | Attendance | Overall record | SBC record |
|---|---|---|---|---|---|---|---|---|---|---|---|
| Apr. 1 | Louisiana–Monroe | | Jaguar Field • Mobile, AL | **W** 2–1 | **Hardy** (11-6) | Abrams (4-6) | **Lackie** (2) | ESPN+ | 408 | 24–10 | 7–1 |
| Apr. 2 | Louisiana–Monroe | | Jaguar Field • Mobile, AL | **W** 4–0 | **Lackie** (13-4) | Abrams (4-7) | None | ESPN+ | 481 | 25–10 | 8–1 |
| Apr. 8 | at Louisiana | | Yvette Girouard Field at Lamson Park • Lafayette, LA | **L** 5–7 | Schorman (11-4) | **Lackie** (13-5) | None | ESPN+ | 1,398 | 25–11 | 8–2 |
| Apr. 8 | at Louisiana | | Yvette Girouard Field at Lamson Park • Lafayette, LA | **L** 0–8^{5} | Landry (10-4) | **Hardy** (11-7) | None | ESPN+ | 1,398 | 25–12 | 8–3 |
| Apr. 9 | at Louisiana | | Yvette Girouard Field at Lamson Park • Lafayette, LA | **L** 0–2 | Landry (11-4) | **Lackie** (13-6) | Lamb (2) | ESPN+ | 1,004 | 25–13 | 8–4 |
| Apr. 11 | Nicholls | | Jaguar Field • Mobile, AL | **W** 3–2 | **Lackie** (14-6) | McNeill (9-7) | None | ESPN+ | 331 | 26–13 | |
| Apr. 14 | Appalachian State | | Jaguar Field • Mobile, AL | **W** 9–0^{5} | **Lackie** (15-6) | Northrop (8-6) | None | ESPN+ | 296 | 27–13 | 9–4 |
| Apr. 14 | Appalachian State | | Jaguar Field • Mobile, AL | **W** 5–2 | **Hardy** (12-7) | Neas (7-6) | None | ESPN+ | 296 | 28–13 | 10–4 |
| Apr. 16 | Appalachian State | | Jaguar Field • Mobile, AL | **W** 1–0 | **Lackie** (16-6) | Buckner (4-7) | None | ESPN+ | 338 | 29–13 | 11–4 |
| Apr. 21 | at Georgia Southern | | Eagle Field at GS Softball Complex • Statesboro, GA | **W** 5–4^{8} | **Hardy** (13-7) | Kendrick (8-3) | None | ESPN+ | 235 | 30–13 | 12–4 |
| Apr. 22 | at Georgia Southern | | Eagle Field at GS Softball Complex • Statesboro, GA | **W** 6–1 | **Hardy** (14-7) | Barnard (1-6) | None | ESPN+ | 223 | 31–13 | 13–4 |
| Apr. 23 | at Georgia Southern | | Eagle Field at GS Softball Complex • Statesboro, GA | **W** 11–0^{5} | **Lackie** (17-6) | Kendrick (8-4) | None | ESPN+ | 194 | 32–13 | 14–4 |
| Apr. 28 | at Southern Miss | | Southern Miss Softball Complex • Hattiesburg, MS | **W** 10–5 | **Lackie** (18-6) | Leinstock (11-13) | None | ESPN+ | 681 | 33–13 | 15–4 |
| Apr. 30 | at Southern Miss | | Southern Miss Softball Complex • Hattiesburg, MS | **W** 4–1^{8} | **Hardy** (15-7) | Leinstock (11-14) | None | ESPN+ | 784 | 34–13 | 16–4 |
| Apr. 30 | at Southern Miss | | Southern Miss Softball Complex • Hattiesburg, MS | **W** 11–0^{5} | **Lackie** (19-6) | Lee (3-5) | None | ESPN+ | 784 | 35–13 | 17–4 |

May (3–0)
| Date | Opponent | Rank | Site/stadium | Score | Win | Loss | Save | TV | Attendance | Overall record | SBC record |
|---|---|---|---|---|---|---|---|---|---|---|---|
| May 4 | Troy | | Jaguar Field • Mobile, AL | **W** 6–1 | **Lackie** (20-6) | Johnson (24-7) | None | ESPN+ | 444 | 36–13 | 18–4 |
| May 6 | Troy | | Jaguar Field • Mobile, AL | **W** 6–0 | **Hardy** (16-7) | Baker (2-3) | None | ESPN+ | 503 | 37–13 | 19–4 |
| May 6 | Troy | | Jaguar Field • Mobile, AL | **W** 7–6^{8} | **Hardy** (17-7) | Johnson (24-8) | None | ESPN+ | 503 | 38–13 | 20–4 |

Post-Season (1–1)

SBC tournament (1–1)
| Date | Opponent | (Seed)/Rank | Site/stadium | Score | Win | Loss | Save | TV | Attendance | Overall record | Tournament record |
|---|---|---|---|---|---|---|---|---|---|---|---|
| May 11 | vs. (6) James Madison | (3) | Yvette Girouard Field at Lamson Park • Lafayette, LA | **W** 4–1 | **Lackie** (21-6) | Berry (11-6) | None | ESPN+ | 920 | 39–13 | 1–0 |
| May 12 | vs. (2) Marshall | (3) | Yvette Girouard Field at Lamson Park • Lafayette, LA | **L** 2–3 | Nester (27-7) | **Hardy** (17-8) | None | ESPN+ | 918 | 39–14 | 1–1 |

Schedule source:

*Rankings are based on the team's current ranking in the NFCA/USA Softball poll.
