= Georgia State Panthers softball =

Georgia State Panthers
- 2022 Georgia State Panthers softball team
- University: Georgia State University
- Head coach: Becca Mueller (1st season)
- Conference: Sun Belt
- Location: Atlanta, Georgia, US
- Home stadium: Robert E. Heck Softball Complex (capacity: 500)
- Nickname: Panthers
- Colors: Blue and white

NCAA Tournament appearances
- 1994, 2011

Regular-season conference championships
- 1989, 1990, 1992, 1993, 1994, 2006, 2011

The Georgia State Panthers softball team represents Georgia State University for college softball in NCAA Division I. The team currently competes in the Sun Belt Conference. It competed in the Atlantic Sun Conference (A-Sun) prior to joining the CAA. The Panthers play their home games at Georgia State's Panthersville sports complex in the Bob Heck Softball Complex, and are currently coached by head coach Roger Kincaid.

== History ==
Prior to 1985, Georgia State Panthers played slow-pitch softball in the New South Women's Athletic Conference (NSWAC). The softball team first began playing fast-pitch softball in 1985, still in NSWAC, before moving to the Atlantic Sun Conference, which was called the Trans American Athletic Conference (TAAC) at the time. In 2005 the Panthers began competing in the CAA.

The team has claimed six tournament titles, including two in the NSWAC (1989, 1990) and three in the TAAC (1992, 1993, and 1994). The Panthers also claimed the 2011 tournament title in the CAA. They were tournament runners up during the 1986, 1987, 1988, and 1998 seasons.

The program began playing fast-pitch softball in the 1985 season when then head-coach Bob Heck transitioned the team into the TAAC. Initially, the team started out with bare facilities using a rough recreation field lacking locker rooms, scoreboards, or any other basic amenities. Coach Heck is recognized as moving and improving the facilities to its current location in Panthersville, Georgia. He also acted as groundskeeper for the site. Heck retired during the 2011 season and was replaced by current head-coach Roger Kincaid.

When Georgia State began playing fast-pitch softball in 1985, it was the first team in the State of Georgia to do so at the Division I level.

On July 1, 2013, Georgia State joined the Sun Belt Conference for all sports.

== Stadium ==
The Panthers play in the 500-seat Robert E. Heck Softball Complex. The complex was named in April 2003 after former head coach Bob Heck. The first game was played at the field in 1985.

== Head coaches ==
The Panthers have had five head coaches:

#	Coach	Seasons	Wins	Losses	Ties	Win %
5	Becca Mueller	2024-
4	Angie Nicholson	2021-2024	50	111		.311
3	Roger Kincaid	2011–2021	265	180	0	.596
2	Phyllis Guedry	1999–2001	100	80	0	.555
1	Bob Heck	1985–1998;2002–2011	700	584	2	.549

== Season-by-season results ==
#	Year	Wins	Losses	Ties	Games	Championships
1	1985	15	24	0	39
2	1986	26	26	0	52
3	1987	26	22	0	48
4	1988	42	20	0	62
5	1989	31	23	0	54	NSWAC Champions
6	1990	42	23	0	65	NSWAC Champions
7	1991	35	32	0	67
8	1992	35	27	1	63	TAAC Champions
9	1993	39	16	0	55	TAAC Champions
10	1994	40	27	1	68	TAAC Champions, NCAA Regional
11	1995	30	19	0	49
12	1996	20	24	0	44
13	1997	22	30	0	52
14	1998	28	23	0	51
15	1999	34	26	0	60
16	2000	33	29	0	62
17	2001	32	23	0	55
18	2002	38	27	0	65
19	2003	22	33	0	55
20	2004	18	33	0	51
21	2005	19	35	0	54
22	2006	29	28	0	57	CAA Regular Season Champs
23	2007	34	30	0	64
24	2008	37	18	0	55
25	2009	30	20	0	50
26	2010	37	19	0	56
27	2011	36	25	0	61	CAA Tournament Champs, NCAA Regional
28	2012	38	18	0	56
29	2013	36	19	0	55
30	2014	29	25	0	56
31	2015	38	22	0	60
32	2016	33	28	0	61
33	2017	35	25	0	60	NISC Tournament Region 5
34	2018	20	18	0	38
35	2019	8	46	5	22

== See also ==
- List of NCAA Division I softball programs
