= Georgia Southern Eagles softball =

American college softball team

- 2022 Georgia Southern Eagles softball team
- Founded: 1985
- University: Georgia Southern University
- Head coach: Sharon Perkins (1st season)
- Conference: Sun Belt
- Location: Statesboro, Georgia, US
- Home stadium: Eagle Field at GS Softball Complex (capacity: 500)
- Nickname: Eagles
- Colors: Blue and white

NCAA Tournament appearances
- 2006, 2012, 2013

Conference tournament championships
- SoCon: 1999, 2006, 2012, 2013

Regular-season conference championships
- SoCon: 1996, 2012, 2014

The Georgia Southern Eagles softball team represents Georgia Southern University in NCAA Division I college softball. The team participates in the Sun Belt Conference. The Eagles are currently led by first-year head coach Sharon Perkins. The team plays its home games at Eagle Field at GS Softball Complex located on the university's campus.
