= 2023 Florida State Seminoles softball team =

American college softball season

2023 Florida State Seminoles softball

NCAA Tallahassee Regional champion NCAA Tallahassee Super Regional champion ACC Tournament champion ACC champion

Women's College World Series, runner-up
- Conference: Atlantic Coast Conference
- Record: 58–11 (22–2 ACC)
- Head coach: Lonni Alameda (15th season)
- Home stadium: JoAnne Graf Field at the Seminole Softball Complex

2023 Atlantic Coast Conference softball standings
	Conf.						Overall
Team	W		L		T	PCT	W		L		T	PCT
No. 3 Florida State ‍†‍‡‍^{y}	22	–	2	–	0	.917	58	–	11	–	0	.841
No. 5 Duke ‍‍‍^{y}	19	–	5	–	0	.792	48	–	11	–	0	.814
No. 10 Clemson ‍‍‍^{y}	18	–	6	–	0	.750	49	–	12	–	0	.803
Louisville ‍‍‍^{y}	16	–	7	–	0	.696	34	–	20	–	0	.630
No. 24 Virginia Tech ‍‍‍^{y}	14	–	10	–	0	.583	39	–	20	–	0	.661
North Carolina ‍‍‍	13	–	10	–	0	.565	26	–	28	–	0	.481
Notre Dame ‍‍‍^{y}	11	–	12	–	1	.479	30	–	19	–	1	.610
Virginia ‍‍‍	8	–	16	–	0	.333	30	–	22	–	0	.577
Syracuse ‍‍‍	7	–	15	–	1	.326	19	–	25	–	1	.433
Georgia Tech ‍‍‍	7	–	17	–	0	.292	26	–	27	–	0	.491
Pittsburgh ‍‍‍	6	–	17	–	0	.261	24	–	25	–	0	.490
Boston College ‍‍‍	6	–	18	–	0	.250	24	–	28	–	0	.462
NC State ‍‍‍	6	–	18	–	0	.250	18	–	35	–	0	.340
† – Conference champion ‡ – Tournament champion y – Invited to the NCAA tournament As of June 8, 2023; Rankings from NFCA/USA Today

The 2023 Florida State Seminoles softball team represented Florida State University in the 2023 NCAA Division I softball season. The Seminoles were coached by Lonni Alameda, who led her fifteenth season. The Seminoles finished with a record of 58–11.

The Seminoles were invited to the 2023 NCAA Division I Softball Tournament, where they swept the NCAA Tallahassee Regional Super Regional and then completed a run to the title game of the Women's College World Series where they fell to champion Oklahoma.

== Personnel ==
=== Roster ===
2023 Florida State Seminoles roster
Pitchers: 5 - Allison Royalty - Junior; 13 - Mack Leonard - Senior; 16 - Ali DuBois - Senior; 17 - Emma Wilson - Junior; 21 - Madi Balk - Freshman; 31 - Makenna Reid - Freshman; 32 - Kathryn Sandercock - Senior; Catchers: 20 - Kaia Lopreste - Senior; 24 - Madi Frey - Freshman; 51 - Michaela Edenfield - Sophomore; 77 - Katie Dack - Sophomore	Infielders: 3 - Bethaney Keen - Graduate; 9 - Devyn Flaherty - Junior; 10 - Josie Muffley - Senior; 12 - Amaya Ross - Sophomore; 27 - Krystina Hartley - Sophomore; 30 - Avery Weisbrook - Freshman; Outfielders: 1 - Hallie Wacaser - Sophomore; 4 - Jahni Kerr - (redshirt) Sophomore; 6 - Kaley Mudge - Junior; 14 - Autumn Belviy - Sophomore	Utility: 8 - Kalei Harding - Junior

=== Coaches ===
2023 Florida State Seminoles softball coaching staff
- Lonni Alameda - Head Coach - 15th season
- Travis Wilson - Assistant coach - 12th season
- Troy Cameron - Assistant coach - 3rd season
- Kaleigh Rafter - Volunteer assistant coach - 2nd season

== Schedule ==
Legend
	Florida State win
	Florida State loss
*	Non-Conference game

2023 Florida State Seminoles softball game log
Regular season

February
Date	Opponent	Rank	Site/stadium	Score	Overall record	ACC record
Feb 9	Lipscomb*	No. 5	JoAnne Graf Field at the Seminole Softball Complex • Tallahassee, FL	W 3–0	1–0	
Feb 9	Lipscomb*	No. 5	JoAnne Graf Field at the Seminole Softball Complex • Tallahassee, FL	W 4–1	2–0	
Feb 11	Lipscomb*	No. 5	JoAnne Graf Field at the Seminole Softball Complex • Tallahassee, FL	L 4–5	2–1	
Feb 11	Purdue*	No. 5	JoAnne Graf Field at the Seminole Softball Complex • Tallahassee, FL	W 8–1	3–1	
Feb 12	Longwood*	No. 5	JoAnne Graf Field at the Seminole Softball Complex • Tallahassee, FL	W 5–0	4–1	
Feb 14	Florida A&M*	No. 6	JoAnne Graf Field at the Seminole Softball Complex • Tallahassee, FL	W 8–0^{5}	5–1	
Feb 14	Florida A&M*	No. 6	JoAnne Graf Field at the Seminole Softball Complex • Tallahassee, FL	W 9–1^{6}	6–1	
Feb 16	vs No. 10 Arizona*	No. 6	Eddie C. Moore Complex • Clearwater, FL (TaxAct Clearwater Invitational)	W 6–4	7–1	
Feb 17	vs No. 4 Arkansas*	No. 6	Eddie C. Moore Complex • Clearwater, FL (TaxAct Clearwater Invitational)	W 9–6	8–1	
Feb 18	vs No. 2 UCLA*	No. 6	Eddie C. Moore Complex • Clearwater, FL (TaxAct Clearwater Invitational)	L 4–6	8–2	
Feb 19	vs Louisiana*	No. 6	Eddie C. Moore Complex • Clearwater, FL (TaxAct Clearwater Invitational)	W 10–2^{6}	9–2	
Feb 19	vs No. 15 Alabama*	No. 6	Eddie C. Moore Complex • Clearwater, FL (TaxAct Clearwater Invitational)	L 1–2	9–3	
Feb 22	North Florida*	No. 6	JoAnne Graf Field at the Seminole Softball Complex • Tallahassee, FL	W 4–3	10–3	
Feb 23	Florida Gulf Coast*	No. 6	JoAnne Graf Field at the Seminole Softball Complex • Tallahassee, FL	W 13–5^{6}	11–3	
Feb 24	Lamar*	No. 6	JoAnne Graf Field at the Seminole Softball Complex • Tallahassee, FL	W 4–0	12–3	
Feb 24	Florida Gulf Coast*	No. 6	JoAnne Graf Field at the Seminole Softball Complex • Tallahassee, FL	W 7–2	13–3	
Feb 25	Lamar*	No. 6	JoAnne Graf Field at the Seminole Softball Complex • Tallahassee, FL	W 11–3^{6}	14–3	
Feb 25	Troy*	No. 6	JoAnne Graf Field at the Seminole Softball Complex • Tallahassee, FL	W 2–1	15–3	

March
Date	Opponent	Rank	Site/stadium	Score	Overall record	ACC record
Mar 3	UMass*	No. 5	JoAnne Graf Field at the Seminole Softball Complex • Tallahassee, FL	W 8–0^{5}	16–3	
Mar 3	Colgate*	No. 5	JoAnne Graf Field at the Seminole Softball Complex • Tallahassee, FL	W 9–1^{6}	17–3	
Mar 4	Georgia Southern*	No. 5	JoAnne Graf Field at the Seminole Softball Complex • Tallahassee, FL	W 4–0	18–3	
Mar 4	Colgate*	No. 5	JoAnne Graf Field at the Seminole Softball Complex • Tallahassee, FL	W 13–2^{5}	19–3	
Mar 5	Georgia Southern*	No. 5	JoAnne Graf Field at the Seminole Softball Complex • Tallahassee, FL	W 9–1^{5}	20–3	
Mar 10	at No. 3 Oklahoma State*	No. 5	Cowgirl Stadium • Stillwater, OK	W 7–5	21–3	
Mar 11	at No. 3 Oklahoma State*	No. 5	Cowgirl Stadium • Stillwater, OK	L 1–9^{5}	21–4	
Mar 12	at No. 3 Oklahoma State*	No. 5	Cowgirl Stadium • Stillwater, OK	L 2–3	21–5	
Mar 14	at No. 1 Oklahoma*	No. 6	OU Softball Complex • Norman, OK	L 4–5	21–6	
Mar 17	Syracuse	No. 6	JoAnne Graf Field at the Seminole Softball Complex • Tallahassee, FL	W 10–0^{5}	22–6	1–0
Mar 18	Syracuse	No. 6	JoAnne Graf Field at the Seminole Softball Complex • Tallahassee, FL	W 5–1	23–6	2–0
Mar 19	Syracuse	No. 6	JoAnne Graf Field at the Seminole Softball Complex • Tallahassee, FL	W 8–0^{5}	24–6	3–0
Mar 24	at No. 14 Duke	No. 6	Duke Softball Stadium • Durham, NC	W 4–1	25–6	4–0
Mar 25	at No. 14 Duke	No. 6	Duke Softball Stadium • Durham, NC	L 1–2	25–7	4–1
Mar 26	at No. 14 Duke	No. 6	Duke Softball Stadium • Durham, NC	W 7–3^{5.2}	26–7	5–1
Mar 31	Georgia Tech	No. 7	JoAnne Graf Field at the Seminole Softball Complex • Tallahassee, FL	W 6–4	27–7	6–1

April
Date	Opponent	Rank	Site/stadium	Score	Overall record	ACC record
Apr 1	Georgia Tech	No. 7	JoAnne Graf Field at the Seminole Softball Complex • Tallahassee, FL	W 8–0^{5}	28–7	7–1
Apr 2	Georgia Tech	No. 7	JoAnne Graf Field at the Seminole Softball Complex • Tallahassee, FL	W 9–1^{6}	29–7	8–1
Apr 6	at No. 4 Clemson	No. 6	McWhorter Stadium • Clemson, SC	W 7–0	30–7	9–1
Apr 6	at No. 4 Clemson	No. 6	McWhorter Stadium • Clemson, SC	W 4–1	31–7	10–1
Apr 7	at No. 4 Clemson	No. 6	McWhorter Stadium • Clemson, SC	W 3–2	32–7	11–1
Apr 12	Jacksonville	No. 4	JoAnne Graf Field at the Seminole Softball Complex • Tallahassee, FL	W 2–0	33–7	
Apr 14	Virginia	No. 4	JoAnne Graf Field at the Seminole Softball Complex • Tallahassee, FL	W 6–1	34–7	12–1
Apr 15	Virginia	No. 4	JoAnne Graf Field at the Seminole Softball Complex • Tallahassee, FL	L 5–6	34–8	12–2
Apr 15	Virginia	No. 4	JoAnne Graf Field at the Seminole Softball Complex • Tallahassee, FL	W 8–0^{6}	35–8	13–2
Apr 18	at Stetson	No. 5	Patricia Wilson Field • DeLand, FL	W 7–2	36–8	
Apr 20	at No. 18 Virginia Tech	No. 5	Tech Softball Park • Blacksburg, VA	W 4–1	37–8	14–2
Apr 21	at No. 18 Virginia Tech	No. 5	Tech Softball Park • Blacksburg, VA	W 6–3	38–8	15–2
Apr 22	at No. 18 Virginia Tech	No. 5	Tech Softball Park • Blacksburg, VA	W 16–7^{5}	39–8	16–2
Apr 26	No. 14 Florida*	No. 4	JoAnne Graf Field at the Seminole Softball Complex • Tallahassee, FL	W 5–3	40–8	
Apr 28	at Notre Dame	No. 4	Melissa Cook Stadium • Notre Dame, IN	W 5–4^{8}	41–8	17–2
Apr 29	at Notre Dame	No. 4	Melissa Cook Stadium • Notre Dame, IN	W 11–2^{5}	42–8	18–2
Apr 30	at Notre Dame	No. 4	Melissa Cook Stadium • Notre Dame, IN	W 12–0^{5}	43–8	19–2

May
Date	Opponent	Rank	Site/stadium	Score	Overall record	ACC record
May 3	at No. 16 Florida*	No. 3	Katie Seashole Pressly Softball Stadium • Gainesville, FL	W 8–7	44–8	
May 5	Louisville	No. 3	JoAnne Graf Field at the Seminole Softball Complex • Tallahassee, FL	W 6–4	45–8	20–2
May 6	Louisville	No. 3	JoAnne Graf Field at the Seminole Softball Complex • Tallahassee, FL	W 6–4^{11}	46–8	21–2
May 7	Louisville	No. 3	JoAnne Graf Field at the Seminole Softball Complex • Tallahassee, FL	W 2–1	47–8	22–2

Postseason

ACC Tournament
Date	Opponent	Rank/Seed	Site/stadium	Score	Overall record	ACCT record
May 11	(9) Syracuse	No. 3 (1)	Melissa Cook Stadium • Notre Dame, IN	W 4–1	48–8	1–0
May 12	No. 23 (5) Virginia Tech	No. 3 (1)	Melissa Cook Stadium • Notre Dame, IN	W 9–1^{6}	49–8	2–0
May 13	No. 6 (2) Duke	No. 3 (1)	Melissa Cook Stadium • Notre Dame, IN	W 2–1	50–8	3–0

NCAA Tallahassee Regional
Date	Opponent	Rank/Seed	Site/stadium	Score	Overall record	Reg record
May 19	Marist	No. 3 (3)	JoAnne Graf Field at the Seminole Softball Complex • Tallahassee, FL	W 9–0^{5}	51–8	1–0
May 20	UCF	No. 3 (3)	JoAnne Graf Field at the Seminole Softball Complex • Tallahassee, FL	W 5–1	52–8	2–0
May 21	South Carolina	No. 3 (3)	JoAnne Graf Field at the Seminole Softball Complex • Tallahassee, FL	L 0–4	52–9	2–1
May 21	South Carolina	No. 3 (3)	JoAnne Graf Field at the Seminole Softball Complex • Tallahassee, FL	W 1–0	53–9	3–1

NCAA Tallahassee Super Regional
Date	Opponent	Rank/Seed	Site/stadium	Score	Overall record	SR record
May 25	No. 14 (14) Georgia	No. 3 (3)	JoAnne Graf Field at the Seminole Softball Complex • Tallahassee, FL	W 8–1	54–9	1–0
May 26	No. 14 (14) Georgia	No. 3 (3)	JoAnne Graf Field at the Seminole Softball Complex • Tallahassee, FL	W 4–2	55–9	2–0

NCAA Women's College World Series
Date	Opponent	Rank/Seed	Site/stadium	Score	Overall record	WCWS Record
June 1	No. 9 (6) Oklahoma State	No. 3 (3)	ASA Hall of Fame Stadium • Oklahoma City, OK	W 8–0^{6}	56–9	1–0
June 3	No. 6 (7) Washington	No. 3 (3)	ASA Hall of Fame Stadium • Oklahoma City, OK	W 3–1	57–9	2–0
June 5	No. 4 (4) Tennessee	No. 3 (3)	ASA Hall of Fame Stadium • Oklahoma City, OK	W 5–1	58–9	3–0
June 7	No. 1 (1) Oklahoma	No. 3 (3)	ASA Hall of Fame Stadium • Oklahoma City, OK	L 0–5	58–10	3–1
June 8	No. 1 (1) Oklahoma	No. 3 (3)	ASA Hall of Fame Stadium • Oklahoma City, OK	L 1–3	58–11	3–2

== Rankings ==
Ranking movements Legend: ██ Increase in ranking ██ Decrease in ranking
	Week																
Poll	Pre	1	2	3	4	5	6	7	8	9	10	11	12	13	14	15	Final
NFCA/USA Today	5	6	6	5	5	6	6	7	6	4	5	4	3	3	3	3*	2
ESPN.com/USA Softball Collegiate Top 25	4	7	6	5	6	6	7	7	6	4	5	4	3	3	3	3*	2
D1Softball	4	7	7	5	6	7	7	7	6	4	5	4	3	3	3*	3*	2
Softball America	3	6	7	6	6	7	7	8	7	4	5	4	3	3	3	3	2
