= 2023 Atlantic Coast Conference softball tournament =

- Teams: 10
- Format: Single-elimination tournament
- Finals site: Melissa Cook Stadium; Notre Dame, Indiana
- Champions: Florida State (19th title)
- Runner-up: Duke (2nd title game)
- Winning coach: Lonni Alameda (9th title)
- MVP: Kathryn Sandercock (Florida State)
- Television: ACCN; ESPN2

2023 Atlantic Coast Conference softball standings
	Conf.						Overall
Team	W		L		T	PCT	W		L		T	PCT
No. 3 Florida State ‍†‍‡‍^{y}	22	–	2	–	0	.917	58	–	11	–	0	.841
No. 5 Duke ‍‍‍^{y}	19	–	5	–	0	.792	48	–	11	–	0	.814
No. 10 Clemson ‍‍‍^{y}	18	–	6	–	0	.750	49	–	12	–	0	.803
Louisville ‍‍‍^{y}	16	–	7	–	0	.696	34	–	20	–	0	.630
No. 24 Virginia Tech ‍‍‍^{y}	14	–	10	–	0	.583	39	–	20	–	0	.661
North Carolina ‍‍‍	13	–	10	–	0	.565	26	–	28	–	0	.481
Notre Dame ‍‍‍^{y}	11	–	12	–	1	.479	30	–	19	–	1	.610
Virginia ‍‍‍	8	–	16	–	0	.333	30	–	22	–	0	.577
Syracuse ‍‍‍	7	–	15	–	1	.326	19	–	25	–	1	.433
Georgia Tech ‍‍‍	7	–	17	–	0	.292	26	–	27	–	0	.491
Pittsburgh ‍‍‍	6	–	17	–	0	.261	24	–	25	–	0	.490
Boston College ‍‍‍	6	–	18	–	0	.250	24	–	28	–	0	.462
NC State ‍‍‍	6	–	18	–	0	.250	18	–	35	–	0	.340
† – Conference champion ‡ – Tournament champion y – Invited to the NCAA tournament As of June 8, 2023; Rankings from NFCA/USA Today

The 2023 Atlantic Coast Conference (ACC) softball tournament was held at Melissa Cook Stadium on the campus of the University of Notre Dame in Notre Dame, Indiana, from May 10 through May 13, 2023. The event determines the champion of the Atlantic Coast Conference for the 2022 season. As the tournament winner, Florida State earned the ACC's automatic bid to the 2023 NCAA Division I softball tournament.

This was the fifth year of a 10-team tournament. The 1st round, quarterfinals and semifinals were broadcast on the ACC Network. The championship game was broadcast by ESPN2.

== Format and seeding ==
The top 10 finishers of the ACC's 13 softball-playing members were seeded based on conference results from the regular season. The bottom four seeds will play in an opening round to determine the quarterfinal matchups.

Team	W	L	T	Pct.	GB	Seed
Florida State	22	2	0	.917	–	1
Duke	19	5	0	.792	3	2
Clemson	18	6	0	.750	4	3
Louisville	16	7	0	.696	5.5	4
Virginia Tech	14	10	0	.583	8	5
North Carolina	13	10	0	.565	8.5	6
Notre Dame	11	12	1	.479	10.5	7
Virginia	8	16	0	.333	14	8
Syracuse	7	15	1	.326	14	9
Georgia Tech	7	17	0	.292	15	10
Pittsburgh	6	17	0	.261	15.5	—
Boston College	6	18	0	.250	16	—
NC State	6	18	0	.250	16	—

== Tournament ==
=== Bracket ===
First round
8	Virginia	2
9	Syracuse	8
7	Notre Dame	1
10	Georgia Tech	8

Quarterfinals
1	Florida State	4
9	Syracuse	1
4	Louisville	8
5	Virginia Tech	10
2	Duke	7
10	Georgia Tech	1
3	Clemson	2
6	North Carolina	1

Semifinals
1	Florida State	9
5	Virginia Tech	1
2	Duke	2
3	Clemson	0

Finals
1	Florida State	2
2	Duke	1

=== Game schedule and results ===
Game	Time*	Matchup^{#}	Score	Television	Notes
First Round – Wednesday, May 10
1	1:00 p.m.	No. 9 Syracuse vs. No. 8 Virginia	8–2	ACCN	
2	4:30 p.m.	No. 10 Georgia Tech vs. No. 7 Notre Dame	8–1	ACCN	
Quarterfinals – Thursday, May 11
3	11:00 a.m.	No. 1 Florida State vs. No. 9 Syracuse	4–1	ACCN	
4	2:00 p.m.	No. 5 Virginia Tech vs. No. 4 Louisville	10–8	ACCN	
5	5:00 p.m.	No. 2 Duke vs. No. 10 Georgia Tech	7–1	ACCN	
6	7:30 p.m.	No. 3 Clemson vs. No. 6 North Carolina	2–1	ACCN	
Semifinals – Friday, May 12
7	1:00 p.m.	No. 1 Florida State vs. No. 5 Virginia Tech	9–1	ACCN	
8	3:30 p.m.	No. 2 Duke vs. No. 3 Clemson	2–0	ACCN	
Championship – Saturday, May 13
9	1:00 p.m.	No. 1 Florida State vs. No. 2 Duke	2–1	ESPN2	

=== Championship game ===
2023 ACC tournament championship
No. 2 Duke	1–2	No. 1 Florida State

May 13, 2023 – 1:00 p.m. (EDT) at Melissa Cook Stadium in Notre Dame, Indiana
Team	1	2	3	4	5	6	7	R	H	E
No. 2 Duke	0	0	0	0	1	0	0	1	4	0
No. 1 Florida State	0	0	1	0	0	0	1	2	7	1
WP: Kathryn Sandercock (23–3) LP: Lillie Walker (7–2); Attendance: 957

== All Tournament Team ==
Player	Team
Valerie Cagle	Clemson
Cassidy Curd	Duke
Deja Davis	Duke
Aminah Vega	Duke
Kalei Harding	Florida State
Mack Leonard	Florida State
Josie Muffley	Florida State
**Kathryn Sandercock**	Florida State
Lili Backes	North Carolina
Emma Kauf	Georgia Tech
Addy Greene	Virginia Tech

MVP in bold
