= 2023 NCAA Division I softball rankings =

Women's softball

2023 NCAA Division I softball season
- Preseason No. 1: Oklahoma
- Defending Champions: Oklahoma
- TV partner/s: ESPN

NCAA Tournament
- Duration: May 19 – June 8, 2023
- Most conference bids: SEC – 12 bids

Women's College World Series
- Duration: June 1–9, 2023
- Champions: Oklahoma (7th title)
- Runners-up: Florida State (12th WCWS Appearance)
- Winning Coach: Patty Gasso (7th title)
- WCWS MOP: Jordy Bahl (Oklahoma)

Seasons
- ← 2022 2024 →

The following human polls made up the 2023 NCAA Division I women's softball rankings. The NFCA/USA Today Poll was voted on by a panel of 32 Division I softball coaches. The NFCA/USA Today poll, the Softball America poll, the ESPN.com/USA Softball Collegiate rankings, and D1Softball rank the top 25 teams nationally.

== Legend ==
	Increase in ranking
	Decrease in ranking
	Not ranked previous week
Italics	Number of first place votes
(#-#)	Win-loss record
т	Tied with team above or below also with this symbol

== NFCA/USA Today ==
	Preseason Jan 31	Week 1 Feb 14	Week 2 Feb 20	Week 3 Feb 27	Week 4 Mar 6	Week 5 Mar 13	Week 6 Mar 20	Week 7 Mar 27	Week 8 Apr 3	Week 9 Apr 10	Week 10 Apr 17	Week 11 Apr 24	Week 12 May 1	Week 13 May 8	Week 14 May 15	Final Jun 13	
1.	Oklahoma (32)	Oklahoma (5–0) (32)	UCLA (12–0) (29)	Oklahoma (13–1) (31)	Oklahoma (17–1) (30)	Oklahoma (20–1) (30)	Oklahoma (27–1) (32)	Oklahoma (30–1) (32)	Oklahoma (33–1) (32)	Oklahoma (36–1) (32)	Oklahoma (39–1) (32)	Oklahoma (42–1) (32)	Oklahoma (45–1) (32)	Oklahoma (49–1) (32)	Oklahoma (51–1) (32)	Oklahoma (61–1) (32)	1.
2.	UCLA	UCLA (6–0)	Oklahoma (8–1) (3)	UCLA (17–1) (1)	UCLA (22–1) (2)	Oklahoma State (20–2)	Oklahoma State (25–2)	Oklahoma State (29–2)	Oklahoma State (32–2)	UCLA (36–4)	UCLA (39–4)	UCLA (43–4)	UCLA (46–4)	UCLA (50–4)	UCLA (52–5)	Florida State (58–11)	2.
3.	Oklahoma State	Florida (3–0)	Florida (10–0)	Oklahoma State (13–1)	Oklahoma State (18–1)	UCLA (25–2)	UCLA (27–3)	UCLA (29–4)	UCLA (32–4)	Oklahoma State (35–3)	Oklahoma State (39–4)	Tennessee (37–5)	Florida State (43–8)	Florida State (47–8)	Florida State (50–8)	Tennessee (51–10)	3.
4.	Florida	Arkansas (5–0)	Oklahoma State (8–1)	Clemson (15–1)	Clemson (20–1)	Clemson (25–1) (1)	Tennessee (24–1)	Tennessee (26–2)	Clemson (36–1)	Florida State (32–7)	Tennessee (34–5)	Florida State (39–8)	Tennessee (39–6)	Tennessee (41–8)	Tennessee (44–8)	Stanford (47–15)	4.
5.	Florida State	Oklahoma State (3–1)	Clemson (10–0)	Florida State (15–3)	Florida State (20–3)	Tennessee (20–1)	Clemson (29–1)	Clemson (32–1)	Tennessee (29–3)	Stanford (31–6)	Florida State (35–8)	Texas (39–9–1)	Texas (39–9–1)	Washington (37–11)	Duke (45–10)	Washington (44–15)	5.
6.	Texas	Florida State (4–1)	Florida State (9–3)	Arkansas (13–3)	Arkansas (19–3)	Florida State (21–5)	Florida State (24–6)	Stanford (27–3)	Florida State (29–7)	Clemson (37–4)	Clemson (40–5)	Clemson (44–5)	Stanford (38–10)	Duke (43–9)	Washington (38–12)	Oklahoma State (47–16)	6.
7.	Arkansas	Clemson (5–0)	Arkansas (8–2)	Tennessee (11–1)	Tennessee (16–1)	Stanford (22–2)	Stanford (24–3)	Florida State (26–7)	Stanford (28–6)	Tennessee (30–5)	Texas (36–9–1)	Oklahoma State (39–8)	Oklahoma State (41–9)	Stanford (39–12)	Stanford (40–13)	Alabama (45–22)	7.
8.	Northwestern	Virginia Tech (5–0)	Washington (9–1)	Florida (11–3)	Florida (14–3)	Florida (19–4)	Florida (22–5)	Washington (25–6)	Arkansas (27–9)	Texas (33–8–1)	Stanford (31–9)	Duke (40–8)	Duke (43–9)	Oklahoma State (41–13)	Texas (42–13–1)	Utah (42–16)	8.
9.	Alabama	Texas (2–1–1)	Texas (8–1–1)	Texas (11–2–1)	Texas (17–2–1)	Arkansas (20–6)	Washington (22–6)	Texas (30–5–1)	Texas (30–8–1)	Washington (29–8)	Washington (31–9)	Stanford (34–10)	Washington (35–10)	Clemson (45–8)	Oklahoma State (41–14)	Clemson (49–12)	9.
10.	Clemson	Arizona (5–0)	Virginia Tech (7–3)	Virginia Tech (11–4)	Washington (18–3)	Washington (20–4)	Texas (26–5–1)	Arkansas (24–9)	Washington (26–8)	Arkansas (28–11)	Duke (36–8)	Washington (33–10)	Clemson (45–8)	Texas (40–12–1)	Clemson (46–9)	Duke (48–12)	10.
11.	Virginia Tech	Tennessee (3–0)	Alabama (6–2)	Washington (13–3)	Virginia Tech (14–4)	Texas (21–4–1)	Virginia Tech (22–5)	Florida (24–7)	Duke (28–8)	Duke (30–8)	Arkansas (31–12)	Georgia (37–10)	Georgia (38–10)	LSU (40–14)	LSU (40–15)	Texas (45–15–1)	11.
12.	Arizona	Washington (4–1)	Tennessee (6–1)	Duke (13–3)	Stanford (19–2)	LSU (21–1)	Arkansas (21–8)	Virginia Tech (25–6)	LSU (31–6)	Georgia (31–8)	Georgia (33–10)	Arkansas (34–13)	Arkansas (36–14)	Arkansas (38–16)	Alabama (40–18)	Northwestern (42–13)	12.
13.	Tennessee	Georgia (5–0)	Arizona (7–3)	Alabama (11–3)	Alabama (17–3)	Virginia Tech (19–5)	Kentucky (19–5–1)	Duke (26–7)	Virginia Tech (27–8)	LSU (33–7)	Florida (31–11)	LSU (37–11)	Oregon (35–11)	Georgia (39–12)	Arkansas (38–17)	UCLA (52–7)	13.
14.	Washington	Northwestern (2–2)	Duke (7–3)	Stanford (14–2)	LSU (20–1)	Kentucky (16–5–1)	Duke (24–5)	LSU (26–6)	Georgia (29–6)	Virginia Tech (31–9)	Alabama (32–12)	Florida (32–13)т	Alabama (36–16)	Alabama (38–17)	Georgia (39–13)	Georgia (42–15)	14.
15.	Georgia	Alabama (2–1)	LSU (10–0)	LSU (15–1)	Duke (17–4)	Duke (20–5)	LSU (23–5)	Georgia (27–6)	Florida (26–9)	Florida (28–10)	LSU (34–10)	Oregon (31–11)т	LSU (38–13)	Baylor (39–15)	Northwestern (38–11)	Oregon (42–15)	15.
16.	Duke	Duke (3–2)	Stanford (8–2)	Arizona (10–5)	Kentucky (12–5–1)	Alabama (20–6)	Alabama (22–7)	Kentucky (20–7–1)	Alabama (26–11)	Alabama (28–12)	Baylor (34–10)	Alabama (34–15)	Florida (34–16)	Auburn (39–16)	Auburn (40–17)	LSU (42–17)	16.
17.	Stanford	Kentucky (2–0–1)	Georgia (7–3)	Kentucky (10–3–1)	Arizona (15–6)	Arizona (17–7)	Georgia (24–6)	Alabama (24–10)	Kentucky (21–9–1)	Kentucky (24–10–1)	Oregon (28–11)	Auburn (35–14)	Auburn (37–15)	Oregon (35–14)	Utah (37–13)	Arkansas (40–19)	17.
18.	UCF	LSU (5–0)	Kentucky (6–1–1)	Georgia (12–4)	Auburn (20–2)	Georgia (20–6)	Arizona (20–9)	Oregon (20–10)	Oregon (22–11)	Baylor (30–9)	Virginia Tech (32–12)	Baylor (34–13)	Wichita State (43–8)	Florida (35–19)	Baylor (39–16)	Louisiana (50–16)	18.
19.	Oregon State	Stanford (3–2)	Northwestern (4–4)	Auburn (15–1)	Georgia (17–5)	Auburn (21–5)	Oregon (19–8)	Auburn (24–9)	Auburn (28–10)	Oregon (25–11)	Auburn (32–13)	Wichita State (40–8)	Northwestern (33–10)	Northwestern (35–11)	Oregon (35–15)	San Diego State (39–17)	19.
20.	Kentucky	UCF (3–1)	Auburn (9–1)	Oregon (12–3)	Baylor (17–2)	Oregon (17–6)	Baylor (22–5)	Arizona (20–12)	Arizona (24–12)	Wichita State (34–7)	Kentucky (25–13–1)	Kentucky (27–15–1)	Baylor (36–15)	Wichita State (43–9)	Florida (36–20)	Auburn (42–19)	20.
21.	Auburn	Auburn (4–1)	Maryland (8–1)	Baylor (13–1)	Oregon (16–4)	Baylor (18–4)	Auburn (22–9)	Baylor (23–8)	Baylor (27–9)	Auburn (29–12)	Northwestern (28–9)	Virginia Tech (33–15)	Virginia Tech (35–17)	Utah (34–13)	Wichita State (43–10)	Florida (38–22)	21.
22.	Arizona State	Arizona State (4–1)	Oregon (8–2)	Northwestern (6–6)	Arizona State (15–3)	Arizona State (16–5)	Wichita State (23–6)	Northwestern (17–8)	Wichita State (30–7)	Northwestern (24–9)	Utah (29–8)	Northwestern (30–10)	Central Arkansas (36–9)	Kentucky (30–19–1)	Kentucky (30–20–1)	Baylor (40–18)	22.
23.	Mississippi State	Maryland (4–1)	UCF (5–5)	Arizona State (11–2)	Wichita State (16–3)	Wichita State (19–5)	Utah (21–5)	Wichita State (26–7)	Northwestern (20–9)	Texas A&M (24–13)	Wichita State (36–8)	Utah (30–10)	Kentucky (28–18–1)	Virginia Tech (36–17)	Central Arkansas (44–10)	Wichita State (44–12)	23.
24.	Oregon	Oregon (3–2)	Missouri (9–2)	Missouri (12–4)	Northwestern (9–7)	Texas A&M (16–7)	Northwestern (13–8)	Utah (21–5)	Texas A&M (22–13)	Arizona (24–15)	Central Arkansas (31–8)	Central Arkansas (33–9)	Utah (31–13)	Central Arkansas (39–9)	Virginia Tech (37–18)	Kentucky (31–22–1)	24.
25.	LSU	Michigan (4–1)	Baylor (8–1)	Wichita State (12–3)	Missouri (15–6)	Maryland (19–4)	Louisiana (21–9)	Texas A&M (19–11)	Arizona State (20–11)	Utah (24–8)	Texas A&M (26–16)	Texas A&M (29–17)	Texas A&M (32–18)	Boston University (48–8)	Boston University (51–8)	South Carolina (40–22)	25.
	Preseason Jan 31	Week 1 Feb 14	Week 2 Feb 20	Week 3 Feb 27	Week 4 Mar 6	Week 5 Mar 13	Week 6 Mar 20	Week 7 Mar 27	Week 8 Apr 3	Week 9 Apr 10	Week 10 Apr 17	Week 11 Apr 24	Week 12 May 1	Week 13 May 8	Week 14 May 15	Final Jun 13	
		Dropped: No. 19 Oregon State; No. 23 Mississippi State	Dropped: No. 22 Arizona State; No. 25 Michigan	Dropped: No. 21 Maryland; No. 23 UCF	None	Dropped: No. 24 Northwestern; No. 25 Missouri	Dropped: No. 22 Arizona State; No. 24 Texas A&M; No. 25 Maryland	Dropped: No. 25 Louisiana	Dropped: No. 24 Utah	Dropped: No. 25 Arizona State	Dropped: No. 24 Arizona	None	None	Dropped: No. 25 Texas A&M	None	Dropped: No. 23 Central Arkansas; No. 24 Virginia Tech; No. 25 Boston University	

== ESPN.com/USA Softball Collegiate Top 25 ==
	Preseason Jan 24	Week 1 Feb 14	Week 2 Feb 21	Week 3 Feb 28	Week 4 Mar 7	Week 5 Mar 14	Week 6 Mar 21	Week 7 Mar 28	Week 8 Apr 4	Week 9 Apr 11	Week 10 Apr 18	Week 11 Apr 25	Week 12 May 2	Week 13 May 9	Week 14 May 16	Final Jun 13	
1.	Oklahoma (25)	Oklahoma (5–0) (25)	UCLA (12–0) (25)	Oklahoma (13–1) (25)	Oklahoma (17–1) (25)	Oklahoma (20–1) (25)	Oklahoma (27–1)	Oklahoma (30–1)	Oklahoma (33–1)	Oklahoma (36–1)	Oklahoma (39–1)	Oklahoma (42–1)	Oklahoma (45–1)	Oklahoma (49–1)	Oklahoma (51–1)	Oklahoma (61–1)	1.
2.	UCLA	UCLA (6–0)	Oklahoma (8–1)	UCLA (17–1)	UCLA (22–1)	Oklahoma State (20–2)	Oklahoma State (25–2)	Oklahoma State (29–2)	Oklahoma State (32–2)	UCLA (36–4)	UCLA (39–4)	UCLA (43–4)	UCLA (47–4)	UCLA (50–4)	UCLA (52–5)	Florida State (58–11)	2.
3.	Oklahoma State	Florida (3–0)	Florida (10–0)	Oklahoma State (13–1)	Oklahoma State (18–1)	UCLA (25–2)	Tennessee (24–1)	Tennessee (26–2)	UCLA (32–4)	Oklahoma State (35–3)	Oklahoma State (39–4)	Tennessee (37–5)	Florida State (43–8)	Florida State (47–8)	Florida State (50–8)	Stanford (47–15)	3.
4.	Florida State	Arkansas (5–0)	Oklahoma State (8–1)	Clemson (15–1)	Clemson (20–1)	Clemson (25–1)т	UCLA (27–3)	UCLA (29–4)	Clemson (36–1)	Florida State (32–7)	Tennessee (34–5)	Florida State (39–8)	Tennessee (39–6)	Tennessee (41–8)	Tennessee (44–8)	Tennessee (51–10)	4.
5.	Florida	Oklahoma State (3–1)	Clemson (10–0)	Florida State (15–3)	Tennessee (16–1)	Tennessee (20–1)т	Clemson (29–1)	Clemson (32–1)	Tennessee (29–3)	Stanford (31–6)	Florida State (35–8)	Texas (39–9–1)	Texas (39–9–1)	Washington (37–11)	Washington (38–12)	Washington (44–15)	5.
6.	Arkansas	Clemson (5–0)	Florida State (9–3)	Tennessee (11–1)	Florida State (20–3)	Florida State (21–5)	Stanford (24–3)	Stanford (27–3)	Florida State (29–7)	Tennessee (30–5)	Clemson (40–5)	Clemson (44–5)	Oklahoma State (41–9)	Stanford (39–12)	Stanford (40–13)	Oklahoma State (47–16)	6.
7.	Alabama	Florida State (4–1)	Alabama (6–2)	Arkansas (13–3)	Arkansas (19–3)	Stanford (22–2)	Florida State (24–6)	Florida State (26–7)	Stanford (28–6)	Clemson (37–4)	Texas (36–9–1)	Oklahoma State (39–8)	Stanford (38–10)	Texas (40–12–1)	Duke (45–10)	Alabama (45–22)	7.
8.	Northwestern	Tennessee (3–0)	Arkansas (8–2)	Stanford (14–2)	Stanford (19–2)	Washington (20–4)	Texas (26–5–1)	Texas (30–5–1)	Georgia (29–6)	Texas (33–8–1)	Stanford (31–9)	Stanford (34–10)	Clemson (45–8)	Oklahoma State (41–13)	Texas (42–13–1)	Utah (42–16)	8.
9.	Texas	Virginia Tech (5–0)	Tennessee (6–1)	Alabama (11–3)	Alabama (17–3)	Texas (21–4–1)	Washington (22–6)	Washington (25–6)	Arkansas (27–9)	Georgia (31–8)	Washington (31–9)	Duke (40–8)	Washington (35–10)	Duke (43–9)	Oklahoma State (41–14)	Clemson (49–12)	9.
10.	Clemson	Georgia (5–0)	Washington (9–1)	Florida (11–3)	Texas (17–2–1)	LSU (21–1)	Florida (22–5)	Georgia (27–6)	Texas (30–8–1)	Washington (29–8)	Duke (36–8)	Washington (33–10)	Georgia (38–10)	Clemson (45–8)	Clemson (46–9)	Duke (48–12)	10.
11.	Virginia Tech	Northwestern (2–2)	Stanford (8–2)	Texas (11–2–1)	Washington (18–3)	Florida (19–4)	Kentucky (19–5–1)	Arkansas (24–9)	Washington (26–8)т	Arkansas (28–11)	Georgia (33–10)	Georgia (37–10)	Duke (43–9)	Georgia (39–12)	Alabama (40–18)	Texas (45–15–1)	11.
12.	Tennessee	Alabama (2–1)	Virginia Tech (7–3)	Washington (13–3)	Florida (14–3)	Arkansas (20–6)	LSU (23–5)	LSU (26–6)	LSU (31–6)т	LSU (33–7)	Arkansas (31–12)	Arkansas (34–13)	Arkansas (36–14)	Arkansas (38–16)	Georgia (39–13)	Georgia (42–15)	12.
13.	Georgia	Texas (2–1–1)	Texas (8–1–1)	Virginia Tech (11–4)	Virginia Tech (14–4)	Alabama (20–6)	Alabama (22–7)	Florida (24–7)т	Duke (28–8)	Duke (30–8)	Alabama (32–12)	Oregon (31–11)	Oregon (35–11)	Alabama (38–17)	Arkansas (38–17)	Northwestern (42–13)	13.
14.	Stanford	Washington (4–1)	LSU (10–0)	Duke (13–3)	LSU (20–1)	Kentucky (16–5–1)	Virginia Tech (22–5)	Alabama (24–10)т	Alabama (26–11)	Alabama (28–12)	Florida (31–11)	LSU (37–11)	Alabama (36–16)	LSU (40–14)	Utah (37–13)	Oregon (38–17)	14.
15.	Arizona	Arizona (5–0)	Duke (7–3)	LSU (15–1)	Duke (17–4)	Virginia Tech (19–5)	Duke (24–5)	Duke (26–7)т	Kentucky (21–9–1)	Florida (28–10)	LSU (34–10)	Florida (32–12)	Auburn (37–15)	Auburn (39–16)	LSU (40–15)	UCLA (52–7)	15.
16.	Washington	Kentucky (2–0–1)	Georgia (7–3)	Georgia (12–4)т	Kentucky (12–5–1)т	Duke (20–5)	Georgia (24–6)	Kentucky (20–7–1)т	Oregon (22–11)	Kentucky (24–10–1)	Oregon (28–11)	Alabama (34–15)	LSU (38–13)	Baylor (39–15)	Northwestern (38–11)	Louisiana (50–16)	16.
17.	Kentucky	Stanford (3–2)	Northwestern (4–4)	Kentucky (10–3–1)т	Baylor (17–2)т	Georgia (20–6)	Arkansas (21–8)	Virginia Tech (25–6)т	Virginia Tech (27–8)	Virginia Tech (31–9)	Northwestern (28–9)	Auburn (35–14)	Florida (34–16)	Utah (34–13)	Auburn (40–17)	Arkansas (40–19)	17.
18.	UCF	LSU (5–0)	Kentucky (6–1–1)	Arizona (10–5)	Georgia (17–5)	Arizona (17–7)	Oregon (19–8)	Oregon (20–10)	Florida (26–9)	Oregon (25–11)	Utah (29–8)	Northwestern (30–10)	Northwestern (33–10)	Oregon (35–14)	Baylor (39–16)	San Diego State (39–17)	18.
19.	Duke	Duke (3–2)	Arizona (7–3)	Baylor (13–1)	Oregon (16–4)	Oregon (17–6)	Utah (21–5)	Utah (21–5)	Texas A&M (22–13)	Baylor (30–9)	Baylor (34–10)	Utah (30–10)	Wichita State (43–8)	Northwestern (35–11)	Oregon (35–15)	Auburn (43–19)	19.
20.	LSU	UCF (3–1)	Auburn (9–1)	Oregon (12–3)	Arizona (15–6)	Baylor (18–4)	Arizona (20–9)	Northwestern (17–8)	Northwestern (20–9)	Northwestern (24–9)	Kentucky (25–13–1)	Baylor (34–13)	Utah (31–13)	Wichita State (43–9)	Florida (36–20)	LSU (42–17)	20.
21.	Auburn	Auburn (4–1)	Missouri (9–2)	Auburn (15–1)	Auburn (20–2)	Texas A&M (16–7)	Northwestern (13–8)	Texas A&M (19–11)	Arizona (24–12)	Texas A&M (24–13)	Auburn (32–13)	Wichita State (40–8)	Baylor (36–15)	Florida (35–19)	Wichita State (43–10)	Florida (38–22)	21.
22.	Oregon	Louisiana (4–0)	Baylor (8–1)	Northwestern (6–6)	Northwestern (9–7)	Auburn (21–5)	Baylor (22–5)	Baylor (23–8)	Baylor (27–9)	Utah (24–8)	Virginia Tech (32–12)	Kentucky (27–15–1)	Virginia Tech (35–17)	Virginia Tech (36–17)	Louisiana (46–13)	Baylor (40–18)	22.
23.	Missouri	Missouri (3–2)	Maryland (8–1)	Missouri (12–4)	Missouri (15–6)	Louisiana (18–9)	Louisiana (21–9)	Auburn (24–9)	Auburn (28–10)	Wichita State (34–7)	Wichita State (36–8)	Texas A&M (29–17)	Texas A&M (32–18)	Texas A&M (33–18)	Virginia Tech (37–18)	South Carolina (40–22)	23.
24.	Louisiana	Oregon (3–2)	Oregon (8–2)	Louisiana (9–6)	Louisiana (13–8)т	Northwestern (9–7)	Texas A&M (16–10)	Arizona (20–12)	Utah (22–7)	Auburn (29–12)	Texas A&M (26–16)	Virginia Tech (33–15)	Louisiana (39–13)	Louisiana (43–13)	Central Arkansas (44–10)	Virginia Tech (39–20)	24.
25.	Oregon State	Maryland (4–1)	UCF (5–5)	Texas A&M (11–4)	Arizona State (15–3)т	Utah (19–4)	Auburn (22–9)	Louisiana (23–10)	Wichita State (30–7)	Louisiana (30–10)	Louisiana (33–12)	Louisiana (36–13)	Central Arkansas (36–9)	Central Arkansas (39–9)	Texas A&M (33–19)	Wichita State (44–12)	25.
	Preseason Jan 24	Week 1 Feb 14	Week 2 Feb 21	Week 3 Feb 28	Week 4 Mar 7	Week 5 Mar 14	Week 6 Mar 21	Week 7 Mar 28	Week 8 Apr 4	Week 9 Apr 11	Week 10 Apr 18	Week 11 Apr 25	Week 12 May 2	Week 13 May 9	Week 14 May 16	Final Jun 13	
		Dropped: No. 25 Oregon State	Dropped: No. 22 Louisiana	Dropped: No. 23 Maryland; No. 25 UCF	Dropped: No. 25 Texas A&M	Dropped: No. 23 Missouri; No. 24 Arizona State	None	None	Dropped: No. 25 Louisiana	Dropped: No. 21 Arizona	None	None	Dropped: No. 22 Kentucky	None	None	Dropped: No. 24 Central Arkansas; No. 25 Texas A&M	

Note: In Week 7 of the rankings, Florida, Alabama, and Duke were all tied for 13th, and Kentucky and Virginia Tech were tied for 16th.

== D1Softball ==
	Preseason Jan 17	Week 1 Feb 13	Week 2 Feb 20	Week 3 Feb 27	Week 4 Mar 6	Week 5 Mar 13	Week 6 Mar 20	Week 7 Mar 27	Week 8 Apr 3	Week 9 Apr 10	Week 10 Apr 17	Week 11 Apr 24	Week 12 May 1	Week 13 May 7	Final Jun 12	
1.	Oklahoma	Oklahoma (5–0)	UCLA (12–0)	Oklahoma (13–1)	Oklahoma (17–1)	Oklahoma (20–1)	Oklahoma (27–1)	Oklahoma (30–1)	Oklahoma (33–1)	Oklahoma (36–1)	Oklahoma (39–1)	Oklahoma (42–1)	Oklahoma (45–1)	Oklahoma (49–1)	Oklahoma (51–1)	1.
2.	UCLA	UCLA (6–0)	Oklahoma (8–1)	UCLA (17–1)	UCLA (22–1)	Oklahoma State (20–2)	Oklahoma State (25–2)	Oklahoma State (29–2)	Oklahoma State (32–2)	UCLA (36–4)	UCLA (39–4)	UCLA (43–4)	UCLA (47–4)	UCLA (50–4)	Florida State (50–8)	2.
3.	Oklahoma State	Florida (3–0)	Oklahoma State (8–1)	Oklahoma State (13–1)	Oklahoma State (18–1)	UCLA (25–2)	Tennessee (24–1)	Tennessee (26–2)	UCLA (32–4)	Oklahoma State (35–3)	Tennessee (34–5)	Tennessee (37–5)	Florida State (43–8)	Florida State (47–8)	Stanford (40–13)	3.
4.	Florida State	Arkansas (5–0)	Florida (10–0)	Tennessee (11–1)	Tennessee (16–1)	Tennessee (20–1)	UCLA (27–3)	UCLA (29–4)	Tennessee (29–3)	Florida State (32–7)	Oklahoma State (39–4)	Florida State (39–8)	Tennessee (39–6)	Tennessee (41–8)	Tennessee (44–8)	4.
5.	Florida	Oklahoma State (3–1)	Clemson (10–0)	Florida State (15–3)	Stanford (19–2)	Stanford (22–2)	Clemson (29–1)	Clemson (32–1)	Clemson (36–1)	Stanford (31–6)	Florida State (35–8)	Texas (39–9–1)	Texas (39–9–1)	Washington (37–11)	Oklahoma State (41–14)	5.
6.	Alabama	Clemson (5–0)	Alabama (6–2)	Stanford (14–2)	Florida State (20–3)	Clemson (25–1)	Stanford (24–3)	Stanford (27–3)	Florida State (29–7)	Georgia (31–8)	Clemson (40–5)	Clemson (44–5)	Georgia (38–10)	Duke (43–9)	Washington (38–12)	6.
7.	Northwestern	Florida State (3–1)	Florida State (9–3)	Clemson (15–1)	Clemson (20–1)	Florida State (21–5)	Florida State (24–6)	Florida State (26–7)	Stanford (28–6)	Tennessee (30–5)	Georgia (33–10)	Georgia (37–10)	Oklahoma State (41–9)	Georgia (39–12)	Utah (37–13)	7.
8.	Arkansas	Georgia (5–0)	Stanford (8–2)	Arkansas (13–3)	LSU (20–1)	LSU (21–1)	Kentucky (19–5–1)	Georgia (27–6)	Georgia (29–6)	Clemson (37–4)	Duke (36–8)	Oklahoma State (39–8)	Stanford (38–10)	Stanford (39–12)	Alabama (40–18)	8.
9.	Clemson	Tennessee (3–0)	Washington (9–1)	LSU (15–1)	Arkansas (19–3)	Kentucky (16–5–1)	Georgia (24–6)	Washington (25–6)	Arkansas (27–9)	Texas (33–8–1)	Texas (36–9–1)	Duke (40–8)	Duke (43–9)	LSU (40–14)	Clemson (46–9)	9.
10.	Georgia	Washington (4–1)	Arkansas (8–2)	Baylor (13–1)	Alabama (17–3)	Florida (19–4)	LSU (23–5)	Texas (30–5–1)	LSU (31–6)	Washington (29–8)	Stanford (31–9)	Stanford (34–10)	Clemson (45–8)	Clemson (45–8)	Duke (45–10)	10.
11.	Stanford	Virginia Tech (5–0)	Tennessee (6–1)	Duke (13–3)	Texas (17–2–1)	Texas (21–4–1)	Florida (22–5)	LSU (26–6)	Duke (28–8)	LSU (33–7)	Arkansas (31–12)	Washington (33–10)	Washington (35–10)	Texas (40–12–1)	Georgia (39–13)	11.
12.	Tennessee	Alabama (2–1)	LSU (10–0)	Alabama (11–3)	Baylor (17–2)	Washington (20–4)	Washington (22–6)	Arkansas (24–9)	Texas (30–8–1)	Arkansas (28–11)	Washington (31–9)	LSU (37–11)	Arkansas (36–14)	Oklahoma State (41–13)	UCLA (52–5)	12.
13.	Virginia Tech	Northwestern (2–2)	Duke (7–3)	Florida (11–3)	Florida (14–3)	Texas A&M (16–7)	Duke (24–5)	Duke (26–7)	Washington (26–8)	Duke (30–8)	Alabama (32–12)	Arkansas (34–13)	Auburn (37–15)	Baylor (39–15)	Texas (42–13–1)	13.
14.	Texas	Stanford (3–2)	Georgia (7–3)	Kentucky (10–3–1)	Duke (17–4)	Duke (20–5)	Texas (26–5–1)	Kentucky (20–7–1)	Texas A&M (22–13)	Texas A&M (24–13)	LSU (34–10)	Baylor (34–13)	Alabama (36–16)	Arkansas (38–16)	Northwestern (38–11)	14.
15.	UCF	Kentucky (2–0–1)	Virginia Tech (7–3)	Texas (11–2–1)	Washington (18–3)	Arkansas (20–6)	Alabama (22–7)	Texas A&M (19–11)	Alabama (26–11)	Alabama (28–12)	Baylor (34–10)	Auburn (35–14)	LSU (38–13)	Auburn (39–16)	Oregon (35–15)	15.
16.	Kentucky	Texas (2–1–1)	Kentucky (6–1–1)	Washington (13–3)	Virginia Tech (14–4)	Virginia Tech (19–5)	Virginia Tech (22–5)	Alabama (24–10)	Oregon (22–11)	Baylor (30–9)	Northwestern (28–9)	Alabama (34–15)	Oregon (35–11)	Alabama (38–17)	Louisiana (46–13)	16.
17.	LSU	LSU (5–0)	Texas (8–1–1)	Virginia Tech (11–4)	Kentucky (12–5–1)	Arizona (17–7)	Arkansas (21–8)	Oregon (20–10)	Kentucky (21–9–1)	Oregon (25–11)	Utah (28–8)	Oregon (31–11)	Northwestern (33–10)	Utah (33–13)	Arkansas (38–17)	17.
18.	Arizona	Arizona (5–0)	Auburn (9–1)	Georgia (12–4)	Georgia (17–5)	Georgia (20–6)	Oregon (19–8)	Florida (24–7)	Virginia Tech (27–8)	Northwestern (24–9)	Florida (31–11)	Utah (29–10)	Wichita State (43–8)	Northwestern (35–11)	LSU (40–15)	18.
19.	Auburn	UCF (3–1)	Texas A&M (9–2)	Arizona (10–5)	Oregon (16–4)	Alabama (20–6)	Utah (21–5)	Virginia Tech (25–6)	Indiana (28–9)	Kentucky (24–10–1)	Oregon (28–11)	Northwestern (30–10)	Central Arkansas (36–9)	Central Arkansas (39–9)	San Diego State (35–15)	19.
20.	Louisiana	Duke (3–2)	Arizona (7–3)	Auburn (15–1)	Arizona (15–6)	Baylor (18–4)	Texas A&M (16–10)	Utah (21–5)	Northwestern (20–9)	Virginia Tech (31–9)	Auburn (32–13)	Wichita State (40–8)	Baylor (36–15)	Oregon (35–14)	Auburn (40–17)	20.
21.	Washington	Louisiana (4–0)	Maryland (8–1)	Oregon (12–3)	Texas A&M (14–6)	Oregon (17–6)	Arizona (20–9)	Northwestern (17–8)	Arizona (24–12)	Wichita State (34–7)	Texas A&M (26–16)	Florida (32–13)	Utah (30–13)	Wichita State (43–9)	Baylor (39–16)	21.
22.	Duke	North Texas (4–0)	Northwestern (4–4)	Texas A&M (11–4)	Auburn (20–2)	Maryland (19–4)	Baylor (22–5)	Arizona (20–12)	Utah (22–7)	Utah (24–8)	Wichita State (36–8)	Texas A&M (29–17)	Florida (34–16)	Texas A&M (33–18)	McNeese (44–14)	22.
23.	Oregon	Auburn (4–1)	Baylor (8–1)	Wichita State (12–3)	Wichita State (16–3)	Utah (19–4)	Northwestern (13–8)	Baylor (23–8)	Wichita State (30–7)	Florida (28–10)	Kentucky (25–13–1)	Central Arkansas (33–9)	Texas A&M (32–18)	Minnesota (36–16)	Texas A&M (33–19)	23.
24.	North Texas	Maryland (4–1)	UCF (5–5)	Missouri (12–4)	Nebraska (14–6)	Auburn (21–5)	Louisiana (21–9)	Indiana (22–9)	Baylor (27–9)	Indiana (30–11)	Central Arkansas (31–8)	Kentucky (27–15–1)	Louisville (35–14)	Louisville (35–17)	Wichita State (43–10)	24.
25.	Ole Miss	Texas A&M (6–0)	Missouri (9–2)	Northwestern (6–6)	Maryland (15–4)	Texas State (18–7)	Maryland (22–5)	Wichita State (26–7)	California (24–9–1)	Louisiana (30–10)	South Carolina (30–12)	Louisville (32–14)	Minnesota (33–16)	Cal State Fullerton (33–16)	Liberty (38–20)	25.
	Preseason Jan 17	Week 1 Feb 13	Week 2 Feb 20	Week 3 Feb 27	Week 4 Mar 6	Week 5 Mar 13	Week 6 Mar 20	Week 7 Mar 27	Week 8 Apr 3	Week 9 Apr 10	Week 10 Apr 17	Week 11 Apr 24	Week 12 May 1	Week 13 May 7	Final Jun 12	
		Dropped: No. 23 Oregon; No. 25 Ole Miss	Dropped: No. 21 Louisiana; No. 22 North Texas	Dropped: No. 21 Maryland; No. 24 UCF	Dropped: No. 24 Missouri; No. 25 Northwestern	Dropped: No. 23 Wichita State; No. 24 Nebraska	Dropped: No. 24 Auburn; No. 25 Texas State	Dropped: No. 24 Louisiana; No. 25 Maryland	Dropped: No. 18 Florida	Dropped: No. 21 Arizona; No. 25 California	Dropped: No. 20 Virginia Tech; No. 24 Indiana; No. 25 Louisiana	Dropped: No. 25 South Carolina	Dropped: No. 24 Kentucky	Dropped: No. 22 Florida	Dropped: No. 19 Central Arkansas; No. 23 Minnesota; No. 24 Louisville; No. 25 Cal State Fullerton	

== Softball America ==
	Preseason Jan 24	Week 1 Feb 14	Week 2 Feb 21	Week 3 Feb 28	Week 4 Mar 6	Week 5 Mar 14	Week 6 Mar 21	Week 7 Mar 28	Week 8 Apr 4	Week 9 Apr 11	Week 10 Apr 18	Week 11 Apr 25	Week 12 May 2	Week 13 May 9	Week 14 May 16	Week 15 May 23	Final Jun 13	
1.	Oklahoma	Oklahoma (5–0)	UCLA (12–0)	Oklahoma (13–1)	Oklahoma (17–1)	Oklahoma (21–1)	Oklahoma (27–1)	Oklahoma (30–1)	Oklahoma (33–1)	Oklahoma (36–1)	Oklahoma (39–1)	Oklahoma (42–1)	Oklahoma (45–1)	Oklahoma (49–1)	Oklahoma (51–1)	Oklahoma (54–1)	Oklahoma (61–1)	1.
2.	Oklahoma State	UCLA (6–0)	Oklahoma (8–1)	UCLA (17–1)	UCLA (22–1)	Tennessee (20–1)	Tennessee (24–1)	Oklahoma State (29–2)	Oklahoma State (32–2)	UCLA (36–4)	UCLA (39–4)	UCLA (43–4)	UCLA (48–4)	UCLA (50–4)	UCLA (52–5)	Tennessee (47–8)	Florida State (58–11)	2.
3.	Florida State	Florida (3–0)	Oklahoma State (8–1)	Oklahoma State (13–1)	Oklahoma State (18–1)	Oklahoma State (20–2)	Oklahoma State (25–2)	Tennessee (26–2)	UCLA (32–4)	Oklahoma State (35–3)	Tennessee (34–5)	Tennessee (38–5)	Florida State (43–8)	Florida State (47–8)	Florida State (50–8)	Florida State (53–9)	Stanford (47–15)	3.
4.	UCLA	Arkansas (5–0)	Clemson (10–0)	Tennessee (11–1)	Tennessee (16–1)	UCLA (25–2)	Clemson (29–1)	Clemson (32–1)	Tennessee (29–3)	Florida State (32–7)	Oklahoma State (39–4)	Florida State (39–8)	Tennessee (39–7)	Tennessee (41–8)	Tennessee (44–8)	Duke (48–10)	Tennessee (51–10)	4.
5.	Florida	Oklahoma State (3–1)	Florida (10–0)	Clemson (15–1)	Clemson (20–1)	Clemson (25–1)	UCLA (27–3)	UCLA (29–4)	Clemson (36–1)	Stanford (31–6)	Florida State (35–8)	Clemson (44–5)	Georgia (38–10)	Washington (37–11)	Duke (45–10)	Stanford (43–13)	Washington (44–15)	5.
6.	Northwestern	Florida State (3–1)	Alabama (6–2)	Florida State (15–3)	Florida State (20–3)	Stanford (22–2)	Stanford (24–3)	Stanford (27–3)	Georgia (29–7)	Tennessee (30–5)	Clemson (40–5)	Georgia (37–10)	Texas (39–9–1)	Duke (43–9)	Washington (38–12)	Washington (41–13)	Oklahoma State (47–16)	6.
7.	Arkansas	Clemson (5–0)	Florida State (9–3)	Stanford (14–2)	Stanford (19–2)	Florida State (21–5)	Florida State (24–6)	Georgia (27–6)	Florida State (29–7)	Georgia (31–8)	Georgia (33–10)	Duke (40–8)	Oklahoma State (41–9)	Clemson (45–8)	Clemson (46–9)	Georgia (42–13)	Alabama (45–22)	7.
8.	Alabama	Virginia Tech (5–0)	Washington (9–2)	Duke (13–3)	Arkansas (19–4)	LSU (22–2)	Duke (24–5)	Florida State (26–7)	Stanford (28–6)	Clemson (37–4)	Duke (36–8)	Texas (39–9–1)	Stanford (38–10)	Georgia (39–12)	Stanford (40–13)	Texas (45–13–1)	Utah (42–16)	8.
9.	Texas	Georgia (5–0)	Duke (7–3)	Arkansas (13–3)	LSU (20–1)	Kentucky (16–5–1)	Kentucky (19–5–1)	Washington (25–6)	Duke (28–8)	Duke (31–8)	Stanford (32–9)	Oklahoma State (39–8)	Washington (35–10)	Stanford (39–12)	Georgia (39–13)	Oklahoma State (44–14)	Duke (48–12)	9.
10.	Clemson	Tennessee (3–0)	Arkansas (8–2)	Baylor (13–1)	Duke (17–4)	Duke (20–5)	Georgia (24–6)	Texas (30–5–1)	Arkansas (27–9)	Washington (29–8)	Texas (36–9–1)	Stanford (34–10)	Duke (43–9)	Texas (40–12–1)	Texas (42–13–1)	Utah (40–13)	Georgia (42–15)	10.
11.	Virginia Tech	Washington (4–1)	Stanford (8–2)	LSU (15–1)	Florida (14–3)	Florida (19–4)	Florida (22–5)	Duke (26–7)	LSU (31–6)	Arkansas (28–11)	Washington (31–9)	Washington (33–10)	Clemson (45–8)	Oklahoma State (41–13)	Oklahoma State (41–14)	Northwestern (41–11)	Texas (45–15–1)	11.
12.	Georgia	Kentucky (2–0–1)	Tennessee (6–1)	Florida (11–3)	Baylor (17–2)	Arkansas (20–6)	LSU (23–5)	Arkansas (24–9)	Washington (26–8)	Texas A&M (25–13)	Arkansas (31–12)	Arkansas (35–13)	Arkansas (37–14)	LSU (40–14)	Utah (37–13)	Clemson (49–10)	Northwestern (42–13)	12.
13.	Tennessee	Arizona (5–0)	Georgia (7–3)	Alabama (11–3)	Alabama (17–3)	Washington (20–4)	Washington (22–6)	LSU (26–6)	Texas A&M (22–13)	Texas (33–8–1)	Alabama (31–12)	Oregon (31–11)	Oregon (35–11)	Baylor (39–15)	Northwestern (38–11)	Alabama (43–19)	Clemson (49–12)	13.
14.	Arizona	Northwestern (2–2)	Kentucky (6–1–1)	Kentucky (10–3–1)	Texas (17–2–1)	Texas (21–4–1)	Texas (26–5–1)	Alabama (24–10)	Texas (30–8–1)	LSU (33–7)	Oregon (28–11)	Auburn (35–14)	Auburn (37–15)	Arkansas (38–16)	Alabama (40–18)	Oregon (38–15)	Oregon (38–17)	14.
15.	Duke	Alabama (2–1)	Arizona (7–3)	Texas (11–2–1)	Virginia Tech (14–4)	Texas A&M (16–7)	Virginia Tech (22–5)	Texas A&M (19–11)	Alabama (26–11)	Oregon (25–11)	Utah (29–8)	Alabama (34–15)	Alabama (36–16)	Utah (33–13)	LSU (40–15)	Louisiana (50–14)	Louisiana (50–16)	15.
16.	UCF	Texas (2–1–1)	Virginia Tech (7–3)	Virginia Tech (11–4)	Washington (18–3)	Virginia Tech (19–5)	Arkansas (22–8)	Kentucky (20–7–1)	Kentucky (22–9–1)	Baylor (30–9)	Baylor (34–10)	Utah (30–10)	Northwestern (33–10)	Auburn (39–16)	Baylor (39–16)	San Diego State (38–15)	San Diego State (39–17)	16.
17.	Washington	Duke (3–2)	LSU (10–0)	Washington (13–3)	Kentucky (12–5–1)	Arizona (17–7)	Alabama (22–8)	Florida (24–7)	Oregon (23–11)	Alabama (28–12)	Northwestern (28–9)	Baylor (34–13)	LSU (38–13)	Alabama (38–17)	Auburn (40–17)	UCLA (52–7)	UCLA (52–7)	17.
18.	Auburn	UCF (3–1)	Texas (8–1–1)	Georgia (12–4)	Georgia (17–5)	Georgia (20–6)	Oregon (19–8)	Oregon (20–10)	Utah (22–7)	Kentucky (24–10–1)	LSU (34–10)	Northwestern (30–10)	Baylor (36–15)	Northwestern (35–11)	Arkansas (38–17)	LSU (42–17)	LSU (42–17)	18.
19.	Kentucky	Stanford (3–2)	Texas A&M (9–2)	Arizona (10–5)	Arizona (15–6)	Alabama (20–6)	Utah (21–5)	Utah (21–5)	Arizona (24–12)	Utah (24–8)	Florida (31–11)	LSU (37–11)	Utah (31–13)	Oregon (35–14)	Oregon (35–15)	Auburn (43–19)	Auburn (43–19)	19.
20.	Stanford	Louisiana (4–0)	Maryland (8–1)	Auburn (15–1)	Auburn (20–2)	Baylor (18–4)	Arizona (20–9)	Virginia Tech (25–6)	Virginia Tech (27–8)	Wichita State (34–7)	Auburn (32–13)	Florida (32–14)	Wichita State (43–8)	Texas A&M (33–18)	South Carolina (37–20)	South Carolina (40–22)	South Carolina (40–22)	20.
21.	Michigan	Auburn (4–1)	Auburn (9–1)	Oregon (12–3)	Oregon (16–4)	Oregon (18–6)	Texas A&M (16–10)	Northwestern (17–8)	Florida (26–9)	Northwestern (24–9)	Texas A&M (26–16)	Wichita State (40–8)	Florida (34–16)	Central Arkansas (39–9)	Central Arkansas (44–10)	Arkansas (40–19)	Arkansas (40–19)	21.
22.	Louisiana	LSU (5–0)	Baylor (8–1)	Texas A&M (11–4)	Wichita State (16–3)	Auburn (21–5)	Baylor (22–5)	Arizona (20–12)	Northwestern (20–9)	Virginia Tech (31–9)	Wichita State (36–8)	Texas A&M (29–17)	Texas A&M (32–18)	Wichita State (43–9)	Wichita State (43–10)	McNeese (47–16)	McNeese (47–16)	22.
23.	Mississippi State	Maryland (4–1)	Missouri (9–2)	Missouri (12–4)	Nebraska (14–6)	Utah (19–4)	Northwestern (13–8)	Baylor (23–8)	Wichita State (30–7)	Louisiana (30–10)	Kentucky (25–13–1)	Kentucky (27–15–1)	Central Arkansas (36–9)	Minnesota (36–16)	Texas A&M (33–19)	Middle Tennessee (42–20)	Middle Tennessee (42–20)	23.
24.	Oregon State	Texas A&M (6–0)	UCF (5–5)	Wichita State (12–3)	Texas A&M (14–6)	Maryland (19–4)	Minnesota (19–10)	Auburn (25–9)	Baylor (27–9)	Florida (28–10)	South Carolina (30–12)	Central Arkansas (33–9)	Louisville (35–14)	Virginia Tech (36–17)	Indiana (42–16)	Texas A&M (35–21)	Texas A&M (35–21)	24.
25.	Arizona State	Missouri (3–2)	Northwestern (4–4)	Northwestern (6–6)	Missouri (15–6)	Texas State (18–7)	Wichita State (23–6)	Wichita State (26–7)	Indiana (28–9)	Arizona (24–15)	Central Arkansas (31–8)	McNeese (34–12)	Virginia Tech (35–17)	Louisville (35–17)	Boston University (51–8)	Baylor (40–18)	Baylor (40–18)	25.
	Preseason Jan 24	Week 1 Feb 14	Week 2 Feb 21	Week 3 Feb 28	Week 4 Mar 6	Week 5 Mar 14	Week 6 Mar 21	Week 7 Mar 28	Week 8 Apr 4	Week 9 Apr 11	Week 10 Apr 18	Week 11 Apr 25	Week 12 May 2	Week 13 May 9	Week 14 May 16	Week 15 May 23	Final Jun 13	
		Dropped: No. 21 Michigan; No. 23 Mississippi State; No. 24 Oregon State; No. 25 Arizona State	Dropped: No. 20 Louisiana	Dropped: No. 20 Maryland; No. 24 UCF	Dropped: No. 25 Northwestern	Dropped: No. 22 Wichita State; No. 23 Nebraska; No. 25 Missouri	Dropped: No. 22 Auburn; No. 24 Maryland; No. 25 Texas State	Dropped: No. 24 Minnesota	Dropped: No. 24 Auburn	Dropped: No. 25 Indiana	Dropped: No. 23 Louisiana; No. 25 Arizona	Dropped: No. 24 South Carolina	Dropped: No. 23 Kentucky; No. 25 McNeese	Dropped: No. 21 Florida	Dropped: No. 23 Minnesota; No. 24 Virginia Tech; No. 25 Louisville	Dropped: No. 21 Central Arkansas; No. 22 Wichita State; No. 24 Indiana; No. 25 Boston University	None	
