= 2023 Clemson Tigers softball team =

American college softball season

2023 Clemson Tigers softball
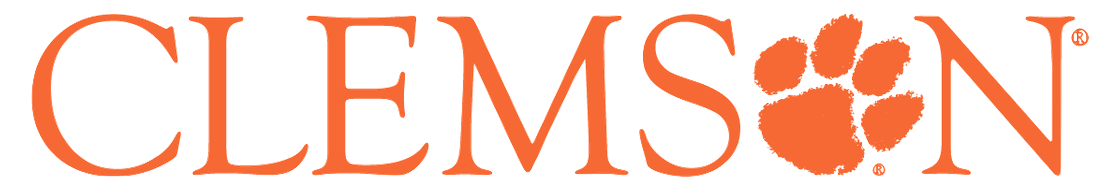

NCAA Clemson Regional champion

NCAA Tournament, Norman Super Regional
- Conference: Atlantic Coast Conference

Ranking
- Coaches: No. 9
- Record: 49–12 (18–6 ACC)
- Head coach: John Rittman (4th season)
- Assistant coaches: Kyle Jamieson; Courtney Breault
- Home stadium: McWhorter Stadium

2023 Atlantic Coast Conference softball standings
	Conf.						Overall
Team	W		L		T	PCT	W		L		T	PCT
No. 3 Florida State ‍†‍‡‍^{y}	22	–	2	–	0	.917	58	–	11	–	0	.841
No. 5 Duke ‍‍‍^{y}	19	–	5	–	0	.792	48	–	11	–	0	.814
No. 10 Clemson ‍‍‍^{y}	18	–	6	–	0	.750	49	–	12	–	0	.803
Louisville ‍‍‍^{y}	16	–	7	–	0	.696	34	–	20	–	0	.630
No. 24 Virginia Tech ‍‍‍^{y}	14	–	10	–	0	.583	39	–	20	–	0	.661
North Carolina ‍‍‍	13	–	10	–	0	.565	26	–	28	–	0	.481
Notre Dame ‍‍‍^{y}	11	–	12	–	1	.479	30	–	19	–	1	.610
Virginia ‍‍‍	8	–	16	–	0	.333	30	–	22	–	0	.577
Syracuse ‍‍‍	7	–	15	–	1	.326	19	–	25	–	1	.433
Georgia Tech ‍‍‍	7	–	17	–	0	.292	26	–	27	–	0	.491
Pittsburgh ‍‍‍	6	–	17	–	0	.261	24	–	25	–	0	.490
Boston College ‍‍‍	6	–	18	–	0	.250	24	–	28	–	0	.462
NC State ‍‍‍	6	–	18	–	0	.250	18	–	35	–	0	.340
† – Conference champion ‡ – Tournament champion y – Invited to the NCAA tournament As of June 8, 2023; Rankings from NFCA/USA Today

The 2023 Clemson Tigers softball team was the varsity college softball team that represented Clemson University during the 2023 NCAA Division I softball season. This was the fourth season of Clemson's softball program. The Tigers competed in the Atlantic Coast Conference (ACC) and were led by head coach John Rittman. Clemson played its home games at McWhorter Stadium in Clemson, South Carolina.

During the season, on March 8, Valerie Cagle became the first Clemson pitcher to throw a perfect game in program history. The game came against Mercer at home.

The Tigers finished the regular season 45–8 and 18–6 in ACC play to finish in third place. As the third seed in the ACC Tournament, they earned a bye into the Quarter finals where the defeated North Carolina before losing to Duke in the Semifinals. The Tigers were selected, via at-large bid, as the sixteenth overall seed in the NCAA Tournament. They hosted a regional and were placed into the Norman Super Regional. They defeated UNC Greensboro and Auburn to earn a spot in the final of the Regional. They lost to Auburn in the first game, but won the second time to advance to the Super Regional. The Tigers lost both games to the eventual national champions Oklahoma Sooners in Norman to end their season.

== Previous season ==
The Tigers finished the 2022 season 42–17 overall and 14–10 in ACC play to finish in fifth place. As the fifth seed in the ACC Tournament, they earned a bye into the Quarter finals where they defeated fourth seed Notre Dame. In the Semifinals they defeated first seed Virginia Tech, but fell to third seed Florida State in the Final. This marked the back-to-back appearances in the Final of the ACC Tournament in the program's first two full seasons. The Tigers were selected, via at-large bid, as the tenth overall seed in the NCAA Tournament. They hosted a regional and were placed into the Stillwater Super Regional. They defeated UNC Wilmington, Auburn, and Louisiana in their Regional to advance to face Oklahoma State in the Super Regional. Clemson lost both games in Stillwater to end their season.

== Personnel ==
=== Roster ===
2023 Clemson Tigers roster
Pitchers: 1 – Rachel Gibson – Sophomore; 2 – Brooke McCubbin – Sophomore; 11 – Haylee Whitesides - (redshirt) Freshman; 19 – Regan Spencer – Junior; 72 – Valerie Cagle – Junior; 87 – Millie Thompson – Junior	Catchers: 4 – Aby Vieira – Sophomore; 9 – Sarah Howell – Sophomore; 13 – Abi Stuart – Sophomore; 23 – JoJo Hyatt – Junior; Outfielders: 6 – Julia Bomhardt – Senior; 7 – McKenzie Clark – Junior; 10 – Caroline Jacobsen - Graduate Student; 16 – Alia Logoleo – Junior; 17 – Ally Miklesh - Graduate Student; 42 – Morgan Johnson – Sophomore	Infielders: 00 – Marena Knowles – Freshman; 3 – Reedy Davenport - Graduate Student; 5 – Ansley Houston – Junior; 8 – Grace Hiller – Freshman; 15 – Madison May – Junior; 21 – Jadeyn Ruszkowski – Freshman; 24 – Arielle Oda – Junior; 28 – Maddie Moore – Sophomore; 58 – Kyah Keller – Junior

=== Coaches ===
2023 Clemson Tigers softball coaching staff
- John Rittman – Head coach – 4th season
- Kyle Jamieson – Assistant coach – 4th season
- Courtney Breault – Assistant coach – 4th season
- Jessie Harper – Volunteer assistant coach – 1st season

== Schedule ==
Legend
	Clemson win
	Clemson loss
	Cancellation
**Bold**	Clemson team member
*	Non-Conference game
†	Make-Up Game

2023 Clemson Tigers softball game log
Regular season

February (15–1)
Date	Opponent	Rank	Site/Stadium	Score	Win	Loss	Save	Attendance	Overall Record	ACC Record
Feb 9	at FIU*	No. 10	Felsberg Field at FIU Softball Stadium • Westchester, FL (FIU Tournament)	**W** 10–1 (5)	**Thompson** (1–0)	Whitney (0–1)	—	358	1–0	–
Feb 10	vs Georgia State*	No. 10	Felsberg Field at FIU Softball Stadium • Westchester, FL (FIU Tournament)	**W** 11–2	**Cagle** (1–0)	Adams (0–1)	—	124	2–0	–
Feb 11	vs Kansas City*	No. 10	Felsberg Field at FIU Softball Stadium • Westchester, FL (FIU Tournament)	**W** 8–1	**McCubbin** (1–0)	Milan (0–1)	—	202	3–0	–
Feb 11	vs Georgia State*	No. 10	Felsberg Field at FIU Softball Stadium • Westchester, FL (FIU Tournament)	**W** 11–3	**Thompson** (2–0)	Hodentt (0–2)	—	289	4–0	–
Feb 12	at FIU*	No. 10	Felsberg Field at FIU Softball Stadium • Westchester, FL (FIU Tournament)	**W** 4–0	**Cagle** (2–0)	Birling (0–1)	—	232	5–0	–
Feb 14	at Furman*	No. 7	Pepsi Softball Stadium • Greenville, SC	**W** 10–0	**Cagle** (3–0)	Tufts (1–1)	—	1,131	6–0	–
Feb 17	No. 14 Northwestern*	No. 7	McWhorter Stadium • Clemson, SC; ACC/Big Ten Challenge	**W** 15–2 (5)	**Cagle** (4–0)	Williams (0–1)	—	1,982	7–0	–
Feb 18	No. 14 Northwestern*	No. 7	McWhorter Stadium • Clemson, SC; ACC/Big Ten Challenge	**W** 3–2	**Thompson** (3–0)	Boyd (0–1)	**Cagle** (1)	2,116	8–0	–
Feb 18	Ohio State*	No. 7	McWhorter Stadium • Clemson, SC; ACC/Big Ten Challenge	**W** 5–1	**Cagle** (5–0)	Smith (2–3)	—	2,116	9–0	–
Feb 19	Ohio State*	No. 7	McWhorter Stadium • Clemson, SC; ACC/Big Ten Challenge	**W** 10–0 (5)	**Spencer** (1–0)	Ruck (0–2)	—	1,752	10–0	–
Feb 21	No. 17 Georgia*	No. 5	McWhorter Stadium • Clemson, SC	**W** 7–1	**Cagle** (6–0)	Macy (1–1)	—	1,912	11–0	–
Feb 23	at South Florida*	No. 5	USF Softball Stadium • Tampa, FL	**W** 6–0	**Thompson** (4–0)	Dixon (1–2)	—	938	12–0	–
Feb 24	vs UIC*	No. 5	USF Softball Stadium • Tampa, FL	**W** 9–2	**Spencer** (2–0)	Toniolo (0–1)	—	220	13–0	–
Feb 25	vs Michigan State*	No. 5	USF Softball Stadium • Tampa, FL	**W** 4–1	**McCubbin** (2–0)	Taylor (1–1)	—	N/A	14–0	–
Feb 25	vs No. 12 Tennessee*	No. 5	USF Softball Stadium • Tampa, FL	**L** 0–1	Pickens (2–1)	**Cagle** (6–1)	—	N/A	14–1	–
Feb 26	vs Michigan State*	No. 5	USF Softball Stadium • Tampa, FL	**W** 8–0 (5)	**Thompson** (5–0)	Miller (5–5)	—	212	15–1	–

March (20–0)
Date	Opponent	Rank	Site/Stadium	Score	Win	Loss	Save	Attendance	Overall Record	ACC Record
Mar 1	Gardner–Webb*	No. 4	McWhorter Stadium • Clemson, SC	**W** 8–0 (5)	**Cagle** (7–1)	Stidham (1–3)	—	1,713	16–1	–
Mar 1	Gardner–Webb*	No. 4	McWhorter Stadium • Clemson, SC	**W** 4–1	**Thompson** (6–0)	Lyon (2–6)	**McCubbin** (1)	1,713	17–1	–
Mar 4	Syracuse	No. 4	McWhorter Stadium • Clemson, SC	**W** 4–1	**Cagle** (8–1)	Hendrix (2–3)	—	1,854	18–1	1–0
Mar 4	Syracuse	No. 4	McWhorter Stadium • Clemson, SC	**W** 8–0 (5)	**Thompson** (7–0)	Pengel (0–2)	—	1,854	19–1	2–0
Mar 5	Syracuse	No. 4	McWhorter Stadium • Clemson, SC	**W** 1–0	**Spencer** (3–0)	Knight (3–3)	**Cagle** (2)	1,786	20–1	3–0
Mar 8	Mercer*	No. 4	McWhorter Stadium • Clemson, SC	**W** 18–0 (5)	**Cagle** (9–1)	Taylor (2–9)	—	1,662	21–1	–
Mar 10	Bryant*	No. 4	McWhorter Stadium • Clemson, SC (Clemson Classic)	**W** 10–1 (5)	**Spencer** (4–0)	Kenney (3–3)	—	1,705	22–1	–
Mar 10	UNC Greensboro*	No. 4	McWhorter Stadium • Clemson, SC (Clemson Classic)	**W** 3–0	**Thompson** (8–0)	Ward (3–2)	—	1,791	23–1	–
Mar 11	Jacksonville*	No. 4	McWhorter Stadium • Clemson, SC (Clemson Classic)	**W** 9–0 (5)	**McCubbin** (3–0)	Harpe (1–1)	—	2,087	24–1	–
Mar 11	UNC Greensboro	No. 4	McWhorter Stadium • Clemson, SC (Clemson Classic)	**W** 6–1	**Cagle** (10–1)	Jones (5–1)	—	2,116	25–1	–
Mar 15	Charlotte*	No. 4	McWhorter Stadium • Clemson, SC	**W** 9–1 (5)	**Cagle** (11–1)	Elkins (2–3)	—	1,660	26–1	–
Mar 18	Virginia	No. 4	McWhorter Stadium • Clemson, SC	**W** 4–1	**Thompson** (9–0)	Bigham (5–3)	—	1,905	27–1	4–0
Mar 18	Virginia	No. 4	McWhorter Stadium • Clemson, SC	**W** 1–0	**Cagle** (12–1)	Grube (7–5)	—	2,003	28–1	5–0
Mar 19	Virginia	No. 4	McWhorter Stadium • Clemson, SC	**W** 2–0	**Cagle** (13–1)	Grube (7–6)	—	1,783	29–1	6–0
Mar 24	at Georgia Tech	No. 5	Shirley Clements Mewborn Field • Atlanta, GA	**W** 9–1 (5)	**Cagle** (14–1)	Neleman (4–6)	—	478	30–1	7–0
Mar 25	at Georgia Tech	No. 5	Shirley Clements Mewborn Field • Atlanta, GA	**W** 8–4	**Thompson** (10–0)	Voyles (2–3)	**Spencer** (1)	542	31–1	8–0
Mar 26	at Georgia Tech	No. 5	Shirley Clements Mewborn Field • Atlanta, GA	**W** 13–0 (5)	**Cagle** (15–1)	Voyles (2–4)	—	498	32–1	9–0
Mar 28	South Carolina*	No. 5	McWhorter Stadium • Clemson, SC (Rivalry)	**W** 10–0 (5)	**Cagle** (16–1)	Gobourne (5–1)	—	2,017	33–1	–
Mar 31	at Boston College	No. 5	Boston College Softball Field at Harrington Athletics Village • Brighton, MA	**W** 8–4	**Thompson** (11–0)	Anderson (6–9)	—	117	34–1	10–0
Mar 31	at Boston College	No. 5	Boston College Softball Field at Harrington Athletics Village • Brighton, MA	**W** 7–3	**Cagle** (17–1)	Dunning (6–5)	—	113	35–1	11–0

April (10–7)
Date	Opponent	Rank	Site/Stadium	Score	Win	Loss	Save	Attendance	Overall Record	ACC Record
Apr 2	at Boston College	No. 5	Boston College Softball Field at Harrington Athletics Village • Brighton, MA	**W** 8–0 (5)	**Cagle** (18–1)	Anderson (6–10)	—	642	36–1	12–0
Apr 5	Furman*	No. 4	McWhorter Stadium • Clemson, SC	**W** 4–1	**McCubbin** (4–0)	Scott (1–8)	—	1,892	37–1	–
Apr 6	No. 6 Florida State	No. 4	McWhorter Stadium • Clemson, SC	**L** 0–7	DuBois (4–2)	**Cagle** (18–2)	Sandercock (4)	1,920	37–2	12–1
Apr 6	No. 6 Florida State	No. 4	McWhorter Stadium • Clemson, SC	**L** 1–4	Sandercock (13–3)	**Thompson** (11–1)	—	1,924	37–3	12–2
Apr 7	No. 6 Florida State	No. 4	McWhorter Stadium • Clemson, SC	**L** 2–3	Reid (8–9)	**Cagle** (18–3)	Sandercock (5)	1,867	37–4	12–3
Apr 11	at South Carolina*	No. 6	Beckham Field • Columbia, SC (Rivalry)	**W** 4–3	**Cagle** (19–3)	Gobourne (7–2)	—	2,165	38–4	–
Apr 14	at NC State	No. 6	Curtis & Jacqueline Dail Softball Stadium • Raleigh, NC	**W** 4–1 (8)	**Cagle** (20–3)	Weixlmann (6–8)	—	501	39–4	13–3
Apr 15	at NC State	No. 6	Curtis & Jacqueline Dail Softball Stadium • Raleigh, NC	**W** 6–3	**Thompson** (12–1)	Inscoe (7–12)	**McCubbin** (2)	758	40–4	14–3
Apr 16	at NC State	No. 6	Curtis & Jacqueline Dail Softball Stadium • Raleigh, NC	**L** 5–7	Weixlmann (7–7)	**McCubbin** (4–1)	—	571	40–5	14–4
Apr 18	Winthrop*	No. 6	McWhorter Stadium • Clemson, SC	**W** 2–0	**McCubbin** (5–1)	Bassinger (15–10)	—	1,870	41–5	–
Apr 21	Pittsburgh	No. 6	McWhorter Stadium • Clemson, SC	**W** 3–2	**Cagle** (21–3)	Drogemuller (7–11)	—	1,923	42–5	15–4
Apr 22	Pittsburgh	No. 6	McWhorter Stadium • Clemson, SC	**W** 2–0	**Thompson** (13–1)	Edwards (7–9)	—	1,946	43–5	16–4
Apr 23	Pittsburgh	No. 6	McWhorter Stadium • Clemson, SC	**W** 11–2 (6)	**Cagle** (22–3)	Drogemuller (7–12)	—	1,907	44–5	17–4
Apr 26	at Liberty*	No. 6	Kamphuis Field at Liberty Softball Stadium • Lynchburg, VA	**L** 4–5	Keeney (22–8)	**Cagle** (22–4)	—	768	44–6	–
Apr 28	at No. 21 Virginia Tech	No. 6	Tech Softball Park • Blacksburg, VA	**L** 4–5	Jacobson (7–2)	**Cagle** (22–5)	—	1,490	44–7	17–5
Apr 29	at No. 21 Virginia Tech	No. 6	Tech Softball Park • Blacksburg, VA	**L** 1–3	Grein (8–3)	**Thompson** (13–2)	—	1,490	44–8	17–6
Apr 30	at No. 21 Virginia Tech	No. 6	Tech Softball Park • Blacksburg, VA	**W** 5–4	**Spencer** (5–0)	Grien (8–4)	**Cagle** (3)	771	45–8	18–6

Postseason

ACC Tournament (1–1)
Date	Seed	Rank	Opponent	Opponent Seed	Site/Stadium	Score	Win	Loss	Save	Attendance	Overall Record	ACCT Record
May 11	3	No. 9	North Carolina	6	Melissa Cook Stadium • Notre Dame, IN	**W** 2–1 (8)	**Cagle** (23–5)	Backes (16–14)	—	495	46–8	1–0
May 12	3	No. 9	No. 6 Duke	2	Melissa Cook Stadium • Notre Dame, IN	**L** 0–2	Curd (16–1)	**Thompson** (13–3)	—	589	46–9	1–1

NCAA Clemson Regional (3–1)
Date	Opponent Seed	Opponent	Seed	Rank	Site/stadium	Score	Win	Loss	Save	Attendance	Overall Record	Regional Record
May 19	4	UNC Greensboro	1	No. 10	McWhorter Stadium • Clemson, SC	**W** 17–2 (5)	**Thompson** (14–3)	Spell (12–6)	—	2,166	47–9	1–0
May 20	2	Auburn	1	No. 10	McWhorter Stadium • Clemson, SC	**W** 7–0	**Cagle** (24–5)	Penta (26–6)	—	2,166	48–9	2–0
May 21	2	Auburn	1	No. 10	McWhorter Stadium • Clemson, SC	**L** 2–5	Penta (27–6)	**Cagle** (24–6)	—	2,166	48–10	2–1
May 21	2	Auburn	1	No. 10	McWhorter Stadium • Clemson, SC	**W** 5–1	**Cagle** (25–6)	Penta (27–7)	—	2,137	49–10	3–1

NCAA Norman Super Regional (0–2)
Date	Opponent Seed	Opponent	Seed	Rank	Site/stadium	Score	Win	Loss	Save	Attendance	Overall Record	Super Reg. Record
May 26	1	No. 1 Oklahoma	16	No. 10	OU Softball Complex • Norman, OK	**L** 2–9	Bahl (17–1)	**Cagle** (25–7)	—	1,979	49–11	0–1
May 27	1	No. 1 Oklahoma	16	No. 10	OU Softball Complex • Norman, OK	**L** 7–8 (9)	Bahl (18–1)	**Cagle** (25–8)	—	2,127	49–12	0–1

Note: All rankings shown are from the NFCA/USA Today poll.

== Rankings ==
Ranking movements Legend: ██ Increase in ranking ██ Decrease in ranking т = Tied with team above or below ( ) = First-place votes
	Week																
Poll	Pre	1	2	3	4	5	6	7	8	9	10	11	12	13	14	15	Final
NFCA / USA Today	10	7	5	4	4	4 (1)	5	5	4	6	6	6	10	9	10	10*	9
Softball America	10	7	5	5	5	5	4	4	5	8	6	6	11	7	7	12	9
ESPN.com/USA Softball	10	6	5	4	4	4т	5	5	4	7	6	6	8	10	10	10*	9
D1Softball	9	6	5	7	7	6	5	5	5	8	6	5	10	10	10*	10*	13

- Various polls did not release during the NCAA tournament. * indicates that the ranking is from pre-tournament for comparison purposes.
