= 2023 College World Series =

2023 College World Series may refer to:

- 2023 Men's College World Series, the final stage of the 2023 NCAA Division I baseball tournament
- 2023 Women's College World Series, the final stage of the 2023 NCAA Division I softball tournament
