= Marissa Young =

American softball coach (born 1981)

Current position
- Title: Head coach
- Team: Duke
- Conference: ACC
- Record: 347–141 (.711)

Biographical details
- Born: August 30, 1981 (age 45); Santa Ana, California, U.S.

Playing career
- 2000–2003: Michigan
- 2004: Texas Thunder
- Position: Pitcher

Coaching career (HC unless noted)
- 2009–2011: Concordia (MI)
- 2012–2013: Eastern Michigan (asst.)
- 2014–2015: North Carolina (asst.)
- 2016–present: Duke

Head coaching record
- Overall: 373–245 (.604)

Accomplishments and honors

Awards
- Big Ten Pitcher of the Year (2002); Big Ten Player of the Year (2003)

Marissa Veronica Young (born August 30, 1981) is an American softball coach who is the current head softball coach at Duke University, a position she has held since 2016.

== Playing career ==
Young played her college softball as a pitcher for Michigan, and was named Big Ten Pitcher of the Year in 2002 and Big Ten Player of the Year in 2003.

== Coaching career ==
Prior to joining Duke, Young was an assistant coach at North Carolina from 2014 to 2015.

In July 2015, Young became the inaugural head coach at Duke, whose softball program began play during the 2016 season.

== Head coaching record ==
Record table
Season	Team	Overall	Conference	Standing	Postseason
Concordia Cardinals (Wolverine–Hoosier Athletic Conference) (2009–2011)
2009	Concordia (MI)	10–37	5–23	7th	
2010	Concordia (MI)	8–36	3–25	8th	
2011	Concordia (MI)	8–31	6–19	6th	
Concordia (MI):		26–104 (.200)	14–67 (.173)		
Duke Blue Devils (Atlantic Coast Conference) (2018–Present)
2018	Duke	29–27	13–11	T-3rd (Atlantic)	
2019	Duke	25–31	11–13	T-3rd (Coastal)	
2020	Duke	23–4	1–2	T-9th	Canceled due to COVID-19
2021	Duke	42–10	26–10	3rd	NCAA Regional
2022	Duke	44–11	19–3	2nd	NCAA Super Regional
2023	Duke	48–12	19–5	2nd	NCAA Super Regional
2024	Duke	52–9	20–4	1st	Women's College World Series
2025	Duke	41-18	16-8	T-4th	NCAA Regional
2026	Duke	43-17	20-4	2nd	NCAA Super Regional
Duke:		347–141 (.711)	145–60 (.707)		
Total:		373–245 (.604)			
National champion Postseason invitational champion Conference regular season champion Conference regular season and conference tournament champion Division regular season champion Division regular season and conference tournament champion Conference tournament champion
