= Pete D'Amour =

American softball coach

Current position
- Title: Head coach
- Team: Virginia Tech
- Conference: ACC
- Record: 230–74–1 (.756)

Biographical details
- Born: Monrovia, Maryland, U.S.
- Education: Missouri

Playing career
- Position: Infielder

Coaching career (HC unless noted)
- 2007–2008: Missouri (Volunteer asst.)
- 2009–2014: Missouri (asst.)
- 2015–2016: Missouri (AHC)
- 2017–2018: Kennesaw State
- 2019–present: Virginia Tech

Head coaching record
- Overall: 309–111–1 (.735)
- Tournaments: NCAA: 14–13

Accomplishments and honors

Championships
- ACC Regular Season Champions (2019, 2022) Atlantic Sun Regular Season Champions (2018) Atlantic Sun Tournament Champions (2018)

Awards
- ACC Coach of the Year (2019, 2022) Atlantic Sun Coach of the Year (2018) NFCA Mid-Atlantic Regional Coaching Staff of the Year (2019, 2021, 2022)

Pete D'Amour is an American softball coach who is the current head coach at Virginia Tech.

== Coaching career ==
=== Virginia Tech ===
On May 31, 2018, Pete D'Amour was announced as the new head coach of the Virginia Tech softball program.

== Head coaching record ==
=== College ===
Record table
Season	Team	Overall	Conference	Standing	Postseason
Kennesaw State Owls (ASUN Conference) (2017–2018)
2017	Kennesaw State	40–20	11–6	2nd	
2018	Kennesaw State	39–17	14–3	1st	NCAA Regional
Kennesaw State:		79–37 (.681)	25–9 (.735)		
Virginia Tech Hokies (Atlantic Coast Conference) (2019–Present)
2019	Virginia Tech	47–11	20–4	1st (Coastal)	NCAA Regional
2020	Virginia Tech	21–4	3–0		Season canceled due to COVID-19
2021	Virginia Tech	37–15	23–11	4th	NCAA Super Regional
2022	Virginia Tech	46–10	21–2	1st	NCAA Super Regional
2023	Virginia Tech	39–20	14–10	5th	NCAA Regional
2024	Virginia Tech	40–14–1	18–6	3rd	NCAA Regional
2025	Virginia Tech	44–9	18–6	T-3rd	
Virginia Tech:		274–83–1 (.767)	117–39 (.750)		
Total:		353–120–1 (.746)			
National champion Postseason invitational champion Conference regular season champion Conference regular season and conference tournament champion Division regular season champion Division regular season and conference tournament champion Conference tournament champion
