= Clarisa Crowell =

American softball coach

Current position
- Title: Head coach
- Team: Penn State
- Conference: Big Ten
- Record: 163–140 (.538)

Biographical details
- Born: November 20, 1980 (age 45); Honolulu, Hawaii, U.S.
- Education: Virginia Tech

Playing career
- 1999–2002: Virginia Tech

Coaching career (HC unless noted)
- 2002–2003: Virginia Tech (Vol. asst.)
- 2004–2005: Ohio (asst.)
- 2006: Syracuse (asst.)
- 2007–2012: Oklahoma State (asst.)
- 2013–2020: Miami
- 2021–present: Penn State

Head coaching record
- Overall: 372–322 (.536)
- Tournaments: NCAA: 1–2 (.333)

Accomplishments and honors

Championships
- Mid-American Conference softball tournament (2016); Mid-American Conference regular season (2019)

Awards
- Mid-American Conference Coach of the Year (2019)

Clarisa Kuulei Aloma Crowell (born November 20, 1980) is an American softball coach and former player. She currently serves as the head coach at Penn State. She previously served as the head coach at Miami. Crowell played college softball at Virginia Tech.

== Early life ==
Crowell is of Hawaiian descent. She was born in Honolulu, Hawaii to Lori and Richard Crowell. Her family moved to Waldorf, Maryland in 1991.

== Playing career ==
Crowell played college softball for Virginia Tech from 1999 to 2002. As a freshman, she posted a 25–8 record with a 1.05 earned run average (ERA), 209 strikeouts and three no-hitters, and was named to the Atlantic 10 All-Conference Team. As a sophomore, she posted a 20–8 record, with a 1.48 ERA, and hit .296 with nine home runs. Following the season she was named to the Virginia all-state team as a pitcher and an outfielder, becoming the first player in state history to make the team at two different positions in the same year. She finished her career with a 65–25 record, with a 1.39 ERA and 475 strikeouts. She also batted .289 for her career, with 16 home runs and 35 doubles.

She finished her career ranked first in winning percentage (.722) and second in career ERA (1.36), strikeouts (362), wins (65), starts (87), innings pitched (614), appearances (106), complete games (62), and shutouts (26). She ranked fourth on the Hokies' career games played list (243) and finished her career with 200 hits, 293 total bases, and 104 runs scored. On November 7, 2013, she was inducted into the Virginia Tech Sports Hall of Fame, becoming the second softball player inducted into the Hall of Fame following Michelle Meadows in 2010.

== Coaching career ==
Crowell began her coaching career as a volunteer assistant coach at her alma mater Virginia Tech from September 2002 to May 2003. She then served as an assistant coach at Ohio from 2004 to 2005, where she was responsible for mentoring the Bobcats' pitchers and infielders, while also assisting with hitting instruction. She served as an assistant coach at Syracuse for one year in 2006, where she assisted the pitching staff. She then served as an assistant coach at Oklahoma State for six years from 2007 to 2012, where she primarily worked with the pitching staff.

=== Miami ===
On August 15, 2012, Crowell was named the head coach of the Miami RedHawks softball team. In 2019, she led Miami to a 35–16 overall record and a 16–4 record in conference play as the RedHawks won their first regular-season title in program history. In eight years as head coach of Miami, she posted a career record of 209–182, becoming the winningest coach in program history.

=== Penn State ===
On August 3, 2020, Crowell was named the head coach of the Penn State Nittany Lions softball team.

== Head coaching record ==
Record table
Season	Team	Overall	Conference	Standing	Postseason
Miami RedHawks (Mid-American Conference) (2013–2020)
2013	Miami	20–31–2	13–12	5th	
2014	Miami	22–28	0–0		
2015	Miami	32–24	13–7	2nd	
2016	Miami	35–25–1	15–7	2nd	NCAA Regional
2017	Miami	29–24	14–10	3rd	
2018	Miami	24–25	11–14		
2019	Miami	35–16	16–4	1st	
2020	Miami	12–8	0–0		Season canceled due to COVID-19
Miami (OH):		209–182 (.535)	90–61 (.596)		
Penn State Nittany Lions (Big Ten Conference) (2021–present)
2021	Penn State	7–34	7–34	14th	
2022	Penn State	32–22	13–10	7th	
2023	Penn State	31–16	11–11	T–7th	
2024	Penn State	35–20	12–11	T–6th	NCAA Regional
2025	Penn State	25–27	10–12	8th	
2026	Penn State	33-21	11-13	10th	
Penn State:		163–140 (.538)	64–91 (.413)		
Total:		372–322 (.536)			
National champion Postseason invitational champion Conference regular season champion Conference regular season and conference tournament champion Division regular season champion Division regular season and conference tournament champion Conference tournament champion
