= Kathryn Sandercock =

American softball player (born 2000)

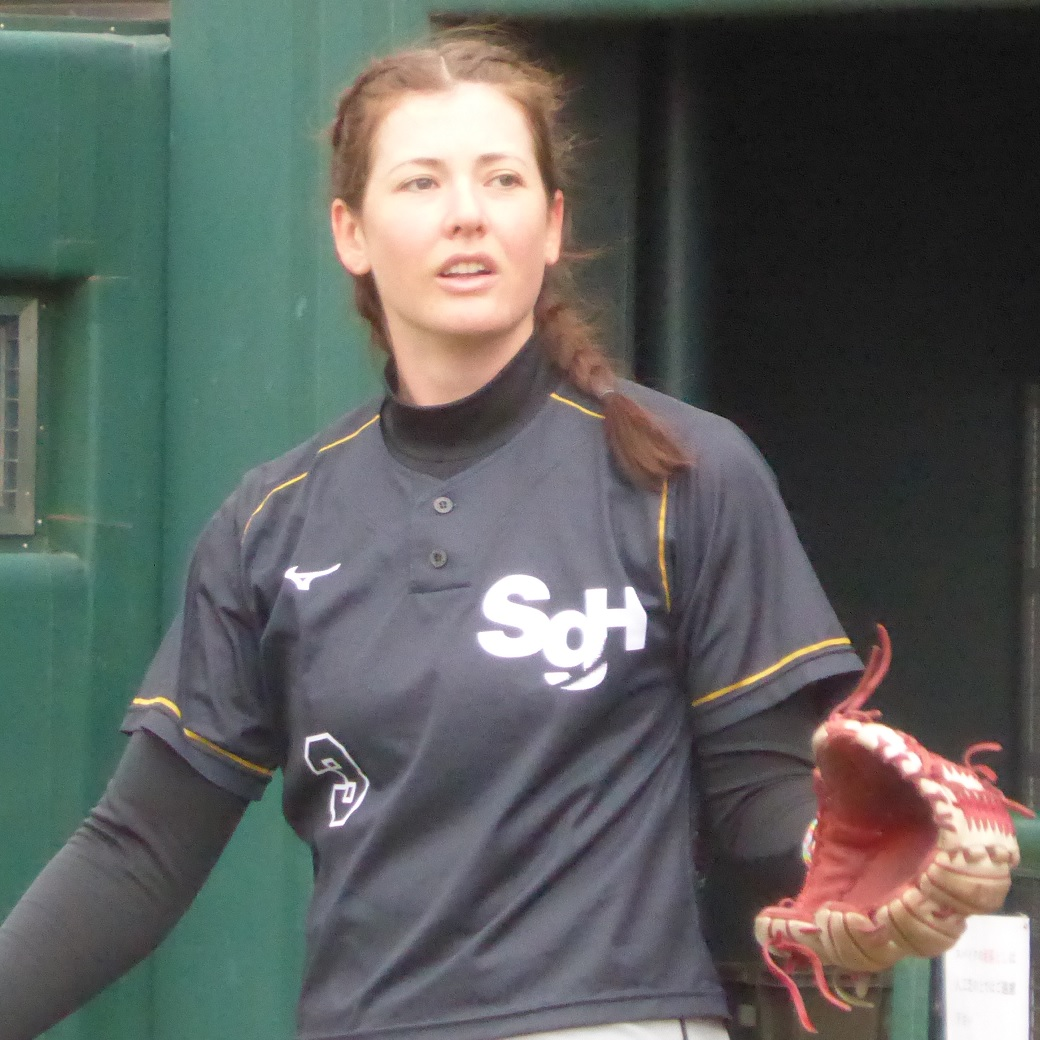
- Sandercock with the SGH Galaxy Stars in 2023

Chicago Bandits
- Pitcher
- Born: August 1, 2000 (age 26); McLean, Virginia, U.S.
- Bats: Right Throws: Right

Teams
- Florida State (2019–2023); SGH Galaxy Stars (2023–present); Chicago Bandits (2025–present)

Career highlights and awards
- 3× Second team All-American (2021–2023); ACC Pitcher of the Year (2023); 3× First team All-ACC (2021–2023); ACC All-Freshman team (2019)
Medals
Women's softball
Representing the United States
Pan American Games
Gold medal – first place	2023 Santiago	Team

Kathryn Jeanne Sandercock (born August 1, 2000) is an American professional softball player for the Chicago Bandits of the Athletes Unlimited Softball League (AUSL). She also plays for the SGH Galaxy Stars of the Japan Diamond Softball League. She played college softball at Florida State.

== High school career ==
Sandercock attended Bishop O'Connell High School in Arlington County, Virginia. During her junior year in 2017, she posted a 26–0 record, with a 0.09 earned run average (ERA) and 330 strikeouts in 151 innings pitched, allowing 35 hits and 19 walks. Offensively she hit .471 with 10 doubles, eight home runs, seven triples and 57 RBI. Following the season she was named the Virginia Gatorade Player of the Year. She was also named the Washington Catholic Athletic Conference Player of the Year.

== College career ==
Sandercock began her collegiate career for Florida State in 2019. During her freshman year she appeared in 32 games, with 11 starts, and posted a 13–0 record, with a 1.99 ERA, and one save in 91 1/3 innings. During the 2020 season, in her sophomore year, she posted a 9–1 record with a 2.82 ERA, 35 strikeouts and two saves in 60 2/3 innings, in a season that was shortened due to the COVID-19 pandemic.

During the 2021 season, in her junior year, she appeared in 43 games with 26 starts, and posted a 27–4 record with a 1.61 ERA, 127 strikeouts, and two saves in 178 2/3 innings. She led the team in appearances, starts, innings pitched, earned runs (32), walks (28), saves (2), opponent batting average (.191) and wins (27). She ranked second in the ACC in ERA and fifth in the country in wins. Following the season she was named a first-team All-ACC selection. She helped lead the Seminoles to a runner-up finish at the 2021 Women's College World Series, losing to Oklahoma. During the World Series, she allowed 28 hits and nine earned runs with 22 strikeouts in 31 1/3 innings.

During the 2022 season, in her senior year, she appeared in 44 games with 25 starts, and posted a 30–3 record with a 1.86 ERA, 157 strikeouts, and three saves in 193 1/3 innings. She led the team in appearances, starts, wins, innings pitched, earned runs (40), walks (30), saves (3), complete games (8), opponent batting average (.189) and ERA. Following the season she was named a first-team All-ACC selection for the second consecutive season. During the 2022 ACC tournament she earned all three wins for the Seminoles as they won their 18th ACC tournament championship.

During the 2023 season, she appeared in 48 games with 25 starts, and posted a 28–4 record with a 1.44 ERA, 119 strikeouts, and ten saves in 193 1/3 innings. During ACC conference play, she posted a 14–0 record, with a 1.03 ERA and four saves in 74 1/3 innings. On March 17, 2023, she pitched her first career no-hitter in a game against Syracuse. She threw 37 pitches in a five inning run rule victory, with two strikeouts and one walk. Following the season she was named ACC Pitcher of the Year, and a first-team All-ACC selection for the third consecutive season. She became the fourth Seminole to reach 100 career wins. During the 2023 ACC tournament she earned all three wins for the Seminoles as they won their 19th ACC tournament championship, and was named tournament MVP. On May 21, 2023, during the Tallahassee Regional of the 2023 NCAA tournament against South Carolina she pitched a perfect game to help Florida State advance to the Super Regionals. This was the 15th perfect game in program history, and Florida State's first perfect game during the NCAA Division I softball tournament.

She finished her collegiate career with a 107–12 record, a 1.44 ERA and 489 strikeouts in 718 innings. She is the program's all-time leader in appearances (184), career saves (18), and single-season saves (10).

== Professional career ==
On April 17, 2023, Sandercock was drafted in the second round, sixth overall, by the Texas Smoke in the 2023 WPF college draft. However, she didn't join the Smoke, and instead signed with Athletes Unlimited and the SGH Galaxy Stars of the Japan Diamond Softball League. During the 2024 season, she posted a 1.41 ERA and 46 strikeouts in 64 1/3 innings.

On December 1, 2025, she was drafted fourth overall by the Bandits in the AUSL allocation draft.

== International career ==
On August 31, 2023, she was named to the United States women's national softball team for the 2023 Pan American Games. During the tournament she had a 3.15 ERA and five strikeouts in 6 2/3 innings and won a gold medal.
