= JoAnne Graf Field at the Seminole Softball Complex =

Sports venue in Tallahassee, Florida

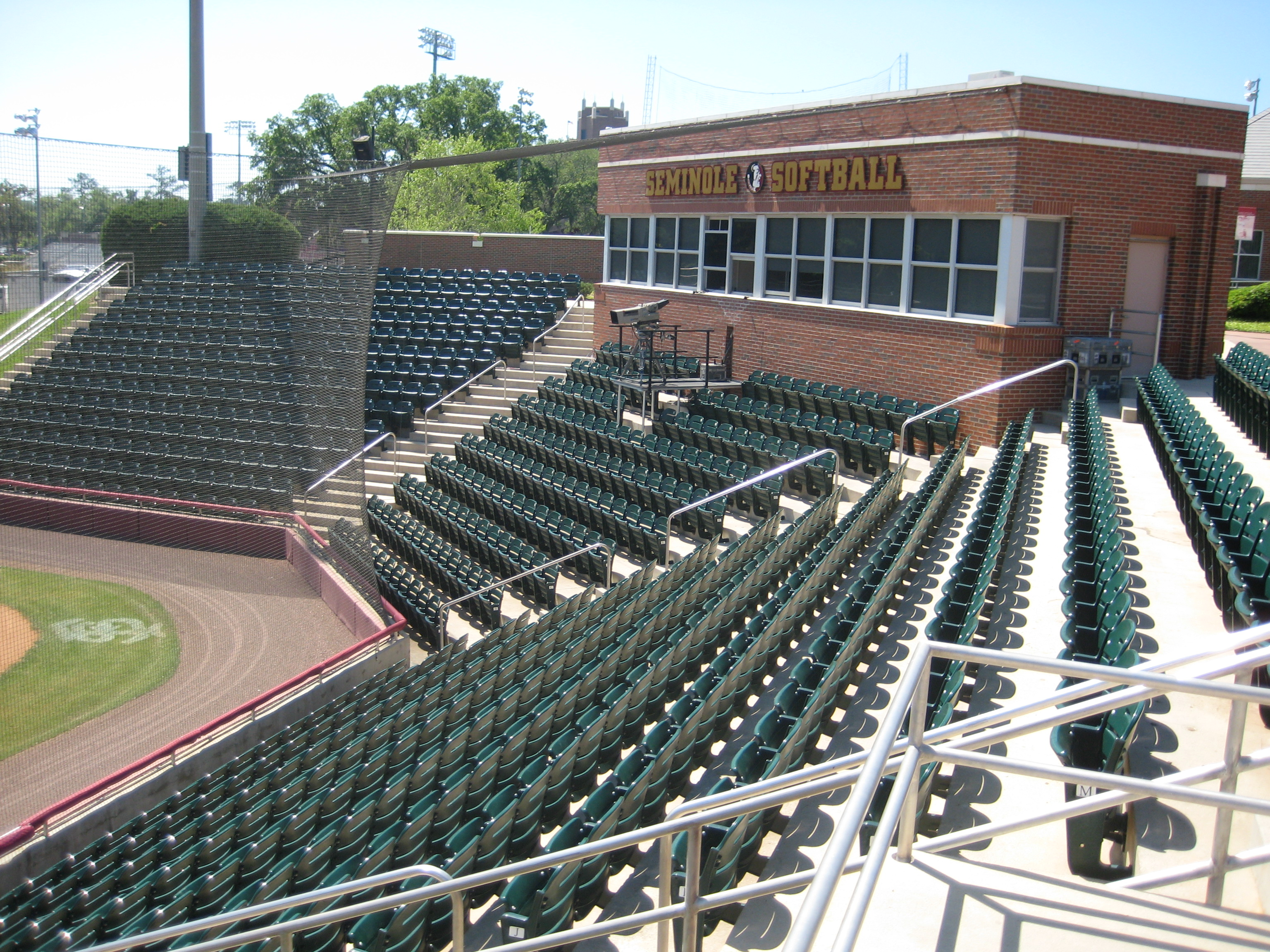
- Interactive map of JoAnne Graf Field at the Seminole Softball Complex
- Location: Tallahassee, Florida
- Coordinates: 30.442°N 84.30479°W
- Owner: Florida State University
- Operator: Florida State Athletics
- Capacity: 1,000; Record: 2,509
- Surface: Grass
- Field size: 200' - lines 220' - center

Construction
- Opened: 1999
- Architects: Gilchrist and Crowe

Tenant
- Florida State Seminoles softball (NCAA)

JoAnne Graf Field at the Seminole Softball Complex is the home field for the Florida State Seminoles softball team located on Florida State University's campus in Tallahassee, Florida.

== History ==
The Florida State Soccer/Softball Complex opened in 1999. On April 2, 2005, former university president T. K. Wetherell and former athletics director Dave Hart officially renamed the softball stadium "JoAnne Graf Field at the Seminole Softball Complex" in honor of JoAnne Graf.

In the fall of 2007, the stadium received improvements as Florida State unveiled a new video scoreboard and a new indoor batting facility was constructed in 2011.

== Advantage ==
Since opening in 1999, Florida State has played to the venue's home-field advantage. The Seminoles have recorded over 400 victories in their 20 years at JoAnne Graf Field. Despite the listed capacity of 1,000 seats, JoAnne Graf Field has had above capacity crowds on three occasions including a record 2,509 on May 3, 2017, against the Florida Gators, 18 years after the official opening of the complex.

== See also ==
- History of Florida State University
- List of Florida State University professional athletes
