= 2023 NCAA Division I softball tournament =

College softball tournament

- Teams: 64
- Finals site: USA Softball Hall of Fame Stadium; Oklahoma City
- Champions: Oklahoma (7th title)
- Runner-up: Florida State (12th WCWS Appearance)
- Winning coach: Patty Gasso (7th title)
- MOP: Jordy Bahl (Oklahoma)

The 2023 NCAA Division I softball tournament was held from May 19 through June 8, 2023, as the final part of the 2023 NCAA Division I softball season. The tournament culminated with the 2023 Women's College World Series at USA Softball Hall of Fame Stadium in Oklahoma City.

Charlotte, Eastern Illinois, George Mason, North Carolina Central, Northern Colorado, Northern Kentucky, and Omaha made their NCAA Division I softball tournament debuts. Arizona failed to make the NCAA tournament for the first time since 1986, while Michigan failed to make the tournament for the first time since 1994.

== Format ==
A total of 64 teams will enter the tournament, with 32 of them receiving an automatic bid by either winning their conference's tournament or by finishing in first place in their conference. The remaining 32 bids will be at-large, with selections extended by the NCAA Selection Committee.

== Bids ==
The Big West and West Coast Conference bids were awarded to the regular-season champion. All other conferences had their automatic bid go to the conference tournament winner.

=== Automatic ===
Conference	School	Best finish	Last NCAA appearance
America East	UMBC	Regionals (2002, 2019, 2021, 2022)	2022
American	UCF	Super Regional (2022)	2022
ASUN	Central Arkansas	Regionals (2015)	2015
ACC	Florida State	National Champion (2018)	2022
Atlantic 10	George Mason	First appearance	First appearance
Big 12	Oklahoma	National Champion (2000, 2013, 2016, 2017, 2021, 2022)	2022
Big East	Seton Hall	Regionals (2005)	2005
Big Sky	Northern Colorado	First appearance (Note: Northern Colorado appeared in the AIAW Women's College World Series 11 times from 1969—1979 prior to the NCAA sponsoring women's athletics. Its best finish was runner-up (3 times: in 1974, 1976, and 1978).)	First appearance
Big South	Campbell	Regionals (1995, 2008, 2009, 2021, 2022)	2022
Big Ten	Northwestern	WCWS (1984, 1985, 1986, 2006, 2007, 2022)	2022
Big West	Long Beach State	WCWS (1986, 1990, 1991, 1992, 1993)	2021
CAA	Hofstra	Super Regionals (2012)	2018
Conference USA	Middle Tennessee	Regionals (2000)	2018
Horizon	Northern Kentucky	First appearance	First appearance
Ivy League	Harvard	Regionals (1998, 2000, 2007, 2011, 2012, 2018, 2019)	2019
MAAC	Marist	Regionals (2006, 2013, 2016)	2016
MAC	Miami (OH)	Regionals (2005, 2009, 2012, 2016, 2021, 2022)	2022
MEAC	North Carolina Central	First appearance	First appearance
Missouri Valley	Southern Illinois	WCWS (1970, 1977, 1978)	2021
Mountain West	San Diego State	Regionals (2001, 2003, 2006, 2008, 2009, 2010, 2011, 2012, 2013, 2014, 2015, 2022)	2022
NEC	LIU	Regionals (2008, 2012, 2016)	2016
Ohio Valley	Eastern Illinois	First appearance (Note: Eastern Illinois appeared in the AIAW Women's College World Series twice (1971, 1974) prior to the NCAA sponsoring women's athletics. Its best finish was 5th place in 1974.)	First appearance
Pac-12	Utah	WCWS (1985, 1991, 1994)	2017
Patriot	Boston University	Regionals (1996, 2002, 2003, 2009, 2010, 2012, 2014, 2016, 2018, 2019)	2021
SEC	Tennessee	WCWS Runner-Up (2007, 2013)	2022
Southern	UNC Greensboro	Regionals (1997, 2018, 2021)	2021
Southland	McNeese	Regionals (1994, 2005, 2010, 2016, 2017, 2018, 2021, 2022)	2022
SWAC	Prairie View A&M	Regionals (2018, 2022)	2022
Summit	Omaha	First appearance (Note: Omaha appeared in the AIAW Women's College World Series 10 times (1969—1973, 1975—1979) prior to the NCAA sponsoring women's athletics. Its best finish was a National Championship in 1975.)	First appearance
Sun Belt	Louisiana	Third Place (1993)	2022
WAC	Grand Canyon	Regionals (2022)	2022
West Coast	Loyola Marymount	Regionals (2005, 2007)	2022

=== At-large ===
Team	Conference
Alabama	SEC
Arkansas	SEC
Auburn	SEC
Baylor	Big 12
California	Pac-12
Cal State Fullerton	Big West
Charlotte	Conference USA
Clemson	ACC
Duke	ACC
Florida	SEC
Georgia	SEC
Indiana	Big Ten
Kentucky	SEC
Liberty	ASUN
Louisville	ACC
LSU	SEC
Minnesota	Big Ten
Missouri	SEC
Nebraska	Big Ten
Notre Dame	ACC
Oklahoma State	Big 12
Ole Miss	SEC
Oregon	Pac-12
South Carolina	SEC
Stanford	Pac-12
Texas	Big 12
Texas A&M	SEC
Texas State	Sun Belt
UCLA	Pac-12
Virginia Tech	ACC
Washington	Pac-12
Wichita State	American

=== By conference ===
Conference	Total	Schools
SEC	12	Alabama, Arkansas, Auburn, Florida, Georgia, Kentucky, LSU, Missouri, Ole Miss, South Carolina, Tennessee, Texas A&M
ACC	6	Clemson, Duke, Florida State, Louisville, Notre Dame, Virginia Tech
Pac-12	6	California, Oregon, Stanford, UCLA, Utah, Washington
Big 12	4	Baylor, Oklahoma, Oklahoma State, Texas
Big Ten	4	Indiana, Minnesota, Nebraska, Northwestern
American	2	UCF, Wichita State
ASUN	2	Central Arkansas, Liberty
Big West	2	Cal State Fullerton, Long Beach State
Conference USA	2	Charlotte, Middle Tennessee
Sun Belt	2	Louisiana, Texas State
America East	1	UMBC
Atlantic 10	1	George Mason
Big East	1	Seton Hall
Big Sky	1	Northern Colorado
Big South	1	Campbell
CAA	1	Hofstra
Horizon	1	Northern Kentucky
Ivy League	1	Harvard
MAAC	1	Marist
Mid-American	1	Miami (OH)
MEAC	1	North Carolina Central
Missouri Valley	1	Southern Illinois
Mountain West	1	San Diego State
Northeast	1	LIU
Ohio Valley	1	Eastern Illinois
Patriot	1	Boston University
SoCon	1	UNC Greensboro
Southland	1	McNeese
Southwestern	1	Prairie View A&M
Summit	1	Omaha
WAC	1	Grand Canyon
West Coast	1	Loyola Marymount

== National seeds ==
Sixteen national seeds were announced on the Selection Show, on Sunday, May 14 at 7 p.m. EDT on ESPN2. Teams in italics advanced to Super Regionals. Teams in bold advanced to the Women's College World Series.

1. **Oklahoma**
2. UCLA
3. **Florida State**
4. **Tennessee**
5. **Alabama**
6. **Oklahoma State**
7. **Washington**
8. Duke

9. **Stanford**
10. LSU
11. Arkansas
12. Northwestern
13. Texas
14. Georgia
15. **Utah**
16. Clemson

== Regionals and Super Regionals ==
The Regionals took place May 19–21. The Super Regionals will take place May 25–28.

=== Norman Super Regional ===
Round 1	Round 2
1	**Oklahoma**	**11**^{(5)}
Hofstra	0
1	**Oklahoma**	**11**^{(6)}
Missouri	0
California	1
**Missouri**	**5**^{(8)}
Norman Regional – Marita Hynes Field
Hofstra	0
**California**	**7**
Missouri	5
**California**	**7**
16	**Clemson**	**17**^{(5)}
UNC Greensboro	2
16	**Clemson**	**7**
Auburn	0
**Auburn**	**12**^{(5)}
Cal State Fullerton	2
Clemson Regional – McWhorter Stadium
UNC Greensboro	0
**Cal State Fullerton**	**5**
**Auburn**	**5**
Cal State Fullerton	0

Regional Finals
1	**Oklahoma**	**16**^{(5)}	—
California	3	—
16	**Clemson**	2	**5**
Auburn	**5**	1

Super Regionals
1	**Oklahoma**	**9**	**8**^{(9)}	—
16	Clemson	2	7	—

=== Durham Super Regional ===
Round 1	Round 2
8	**Duke**	**2**
George Mason	1
8	**Duke**	**5**
Charlotte	0
**Charlotte**	**7**
Campbell	2
Durham Regional – Duke Softball Stadium
George Mason	1
**Campbell**	**7**
**Charlotte**	**6**
Campbell	4
9	**Stanford**	**1**
Long Beach State	0
9	**Stanford**	**8**^{(6)}
Florida	0
**Florida**	**3**
Loyola Marymount	2
Stanford Regional – Boyd & Jill Smith Family Stadium
Long Beach State	1
**Loyola Marymount**	**2**
**Florida**	**10**
Loyola Marymount	6

Regional Finals
8	**Duke**	**4**	—
Charlotte	2	—
9	**Stanford**	**11**	—
Florida	2	—

Super Regionals
8	Duke	1	2	—
9	**Stanford**	**3**	**7**	—

=== Tuscaloosa Super Regional ===
Round 1	Round 2
5	**Alabama**	**5**
LIU	0
5	**Alabama**	**12**
Middle Tennessee	5
Central Arkansas	0
**Middle Tennessee**	**8**^{(5)}
Tuscaloosa Regional – Rhoads Stadium
LIU	0
**Central Arkansas**	**15**^{(5)}
**Middle Tennessee**	**3**
Central Arkansas	0
12	**Northwestern**	**2**
Eastern Illinois	0
12	**Northwestern**	**10**
Kentucky	8
**Kentucky**	**9**^{(6)}
Miami (OH)	1
Evanston Regional – Sharon J. Drysdale Field
Eastern Illinois	0
**Miami (OH)**	**4**
Kentucky	0
**Miami (OH)**	**9**^{(5)}

Regional Finals
5	**Alabama**	1	**1**
Middle Tennessee	**4**	0
12	**Northwestern**	**5**	—
Miami (OH)	4	—

Super Regionals
5	**Alabama**	1	**2**	**3**
12	Northwestern	**3**	1	2

=== Knoxville Super Regional ===
Round 1	Round 2
4	**Tennessee**	**12**^{(5)}
Northern Kentucky	0
4	**Tennessee**	**9**^{(5)}
Indiana	1
**Indiana**	**4**
Louisville	3
Knoxville Regional – Sherri Parker Lee Stadium
Northern Kentucky	1
**Louisville**	**9**^{(5)}
**Indiana**	**4**
Louisville	2
13	**Texas**	**8**^{(5)}
Seton Hall	0
13	**Texas**	**2**
Texas A&M	1
**Texas A&M**	**2**^{(8)}
Texas State	1
Austin Regional – Red and Charline McCombs Field
Seton Hall	3
**Texas State**	**4**
**Texas A&M**	**4**
Texas State	2

Regional Finals
4	**Tennessee**	**7**	—
Indiana	3	—
13	**Texas**	**11**	—
Texas A&M	5	—

Super Regionals
4	**Tennessee**	**5**	**9**	—
13	Texas	2	0	—

=== Tallahassee Super Regional ===
Round 1	Round 2
3	**Florida State**	**9**^{(5)}
Marist	0
3	**Florida State**	**5**
UCF	1
South Carolina	1
**UCF**	**6**
Tallahassee Regional – JoAnne Graf Field
Marist	1
**South Carolina**	**2**
UCF	1
**South Carolina**	**10**
14	**Georgia**	**12**^{(5)}
North Carolina Central	0
14	**Georgia**	**8**
Virginia Tech	3
**Virginia Tech**	**6**
Boston University	1
Athens Regional – Jack Turner Stadium
North Carolina Central	0
**Boston University**	**8**^{(6)}
**Virginia Tech**	**9**^{(5)}
Boston University	0

Regional Finals
3	**Florida State**	0	**1**
South Carolina	**4**	0
14	**Georgia**	**12**^{(6)}	—
Virginia Tech	3	—

Super Regionals
3	**Florida State**	**8**	**4**	—
14	Georgia	1	2	—

=== Stillwater Super Regional ===
Round 1	Round 2
6	**Oklahoma State**	**9**^{(6)}
UMBC	0
6	**Oklahoma State**	**6**
Wichita State	0
**Wichita State**	**6**
Nebraska	5
Stillwater Regional – Cowgirl Stadium
UMBC	2
**Nebraska**	**3**
Wichita State	8
**Nebraska**	**9**^{(9)}
11	**Arkansas**	**11**^{(5)}
Harvard	0
11	Arkansas	4
**Oregon**	**10**
**Oregon**	**5**
Notre Dame	4
Fayetteville Regional – Bogle Park
Harvard	2
**Notre Dame**	**5**
11	**Arkansas**	**5**
Notre Dame	0

Regional Finals
6	**Oklahoma State**	**5**	—
Nebraska	2	—
**Oregon**	**14**^{(5)}	—
11	Arkansas	4	—

Super Regionals
6	**Oklahoma State**	**8**	**9**	—
Oregon	1	0	—

=== Seattle Super Regional ===
Round 1	Round 2
7	**Washington**	**10**^{(6)}
Northern Colorado	2
7	**Washington**	**3**
McNeese	1
Minnesota	4
**McNeese**	**5**^{(13)}
Seattle Regional – Husky Softball Stadium
Northern Colorado	0
**Minnesota**	**4**
**McNeese**	**1**
Minnesota	0
10	**LSU**	**12**^{(5)}
Prairie View A&M	2
10	**LSU**	**4**
Louisiana	0
**Louisiana**	**5**
Omaha	0
Baton Rouge Regional – Tiger Park
Prairie View A&M	0
**Omaha**	**3**
**Louisiana**	**9**^{(5)}
Omaha	0

Regional Finals
7	**Washington**	0	**7**
McNeese	**1**	6
10	LSU	4	8
**Louisiana**	**7**	**9**

Super Regionals
7	**Washington**	**8**^{(5)}	**2**	—
Louisiana	0	0	—

=== Salt Lake City Super Regional ===
Round 1	Round 2
2	UCLA	2
**Grand Canyon**	**3**
Grand Canyon	0
**San Diego State**	**6**
Liberty	0
**San Diego State**	**7**
Los Angeles Regional – Easton Stadium
2	UCLA	1
**Liberty**	**2**
Grand Canyon	1
**Liberty**	**5**
15	**Utah**	**11**
Southern Illinois	9
15	**Utah**	**7**
Ole Miss	1
Baylor	0
**Ole Miss**	**3**
Salt Lake City Regional – Dumke Family Softball Stadium
Southern Illinois	9
**Baylor**	**13**^{(9)}
**Ole Miss**	**9**
Baylor	2

Regional Finals
**San Diego State**	**6**	—
Liberty	3	—
15	**Utah**	**4**	—
Ole Miss	1	—

Super Regionals
San Diego State	**4**	1	2
15	**Utah**	3	**10**^{(5)}	**7**

== Women's College World Series ==
The Women's College World Series was held June 1 through June 9 in Oklahoma City.

=== Participants ===
School	Conference	Record (conference)	Head coach	WCWS appearances† (including 2023 WCWS)	WCWS best finish†*	WCWS W–L record† (excluding 2023 WCWS)
Alabama	SEC	44–20 (14–10)	Patrick Murphy	14 (last: 2021)	1st (2012)	22–25
Florida State	ACC	55–8 (22–2)	Lonni Alameda	12 (last: 2021)	1st (2018)	18–20
Oklahoma	Big 12	56–1 (18–0)	Patty Gasso	16 (last: 2022)	1st (2000, 2013, 2016, 2017, 2021, 2022)	43–23
Oklahoma State	Big 12	46–14 (10–8)	Kenny Gajewski	11 (last: 2022)	3rd (1989, 1990, 1993, 1994, 2022)	15–20
Stanford	Pac-12	44–13 (14–10)	Jessica Allister	3 (last: 2004)	4th (2001, 2004)	4–4
Tennessee	SEC	49–8 (19–5)	Karen Weekly	8 (last: 2015)	2nd (2007, 2013)	15–14
Utah	Pac-12	42–14 (15–9)	Amy Hogue	4 (last: 1994)	5th (1994)	1–6
Washington	Pac-12	43–13 (16–8)	Heather Tarr	15 (last: 2019)	1st (2009)	26–23

=== Bracket ===
First round
1	**Oklahoma**	**2**
9	Stanford	0
4	**Tennessee**	**10**
5	Alabama	5
9	**Stanford**	**2**
5	Alabama	0
3	**Florida State**	**8**^{(6)}
6	Oklahoma State	0
7	**Washington**	**4**
15	Utah	1
6	**Oklahoma State**	**8**^{(5)}
15	Utah	0

Second round
1	**Oklahoma**	**9**^{(5)}
4	Tennessee	0
7	Washington	0
9	**Stanford**	**1**
3	**Florida State**	**3**
7	Washington	1
4	**Tennessee**	**3**
6	Oklahoma State	1

Semifinals
1	**Oklahoma**	**4**^{(9)}	—
9	Stanford	2	—
3	**Florida State**	**5**	—
4	Tennessee	1	—

Finals
1	**Oklahoma**	**5**	**3**	—
3	Florida State	0	1	—

Game times are based on the local time (CDT) in Oklahoma City

=== Game results ===
Date	Game	Winning team	Score	Losing team	Winning pitcher	Losing pitcher	Save	Notes
June 1	Game 1	Tennessee	10–5	Alabama	Ashley Rogers (19–1)	Jaala Torrence (9–3)	Payton Gottshall (3)	Boxscore
June 1	Game 2	Oklahoma	2–0	Stanford	Jordy Bahl (19–1)	NiJaree Canady (16–2)	–	Boxscore
June 1	Game 3	Florida State	8–0 ^{(6)}	Oklahoma State	Kathryn Sandercock (27–3)	Kelly Maxwell (16–6)	–	Boxscore
June 2	Game 4	Washington	4–1	Utah	Lindsay Lopez (14–3)	Mariah Lopez (23–7)	–	Boxscore
June 2	Game 5	Stanford	2–0	Alabama	Alana Vawter (21–8)	Montana Fouts (25–11)	NiJaree Canady (4)	Alabama eliminated Boxscore
June 2	Game 6	Oklahoma State	8–0 ^{(5)}	Utah	Lexi Kilfoyl (16–5)	Sydney Sandez (13–6)	–	Utah eliminated Boxscore
June 3	Game 7	Oklahoma	9–0 ^{(5)}	Tennessee	Jordy Bahl (20–1)	Karlyn Pickens (9–7)	–	Boxscore
June 3	Game 8	Florida State	3–1	Washington	Kathryn Sandercock (28–3)	Ruby Meylan (18–6)	–	Boxscore
June 4	Game 9	Stanford	1–0	Washington	NiJaree Canady (17–2)	Ruby Meylan (18–7)	–	Washington eliminated Boxscore
June 4	Game 10	Tennessee	3–1	Oklahoma State	Ashley Rogers (20–1)	Kelly Maxwell (16–7)	–	Oklahoma State eliminated Boxscore
June 5	Game 11	Oklahoma	4–2 ^{(9)}	Stanford	Jordy Bahl (21–1)	NiJaree Canady (17–3)	–	Stanford eliminated Boxscore
June 5	Game 12	Florida State	5–1	Tennessee	Makenna Reid (13–0)	Payton Gottshall (16–2)	Kathryn Sandercock (10)	Tennessee eliminated Boxscore
Finals
June 7	Game 1	Oklahoma	5–0	Florida State	Jordy Bahl (22–1)	Mack Leonard (2–2)	–	Oklahoma 1–0
June 8	Game 2	Oklahoma	3–1	Florida State	Alex Storako (19–0)	Kathryn Sandercock (28–4)	Jordy Bahl (4)	Oklahoma wins WCWS

=== Finals ===
==== Game 1 ====
June 7, 2023 – 7:00 p.m. (CDT) at USA Softball Hall of Fame Stadium in Oklahoma City, Oklahoma
Team	1	2	3	4	5	6	7	R	H	E
Florida State	0	0	0	0	0	0	0	**0**	**2**	**1**
**Oklahoma**	0	0	0	3	1	1	x	**5**	**9**	**2**
WP: Jordy Bahl (22–1) LP: Mack Leonard (2–2); Attendance: 12,142; Boxscore

==== Game 2 ====
June 8, 2023 – 6:30 p.m. CDT at USA Softball Hall of Fame Stadium in Oklahoma City, Oklahoma
Team	1	2	3	4	5	6	7	R	H	E
**Oklahoma**	0	0	0	0	2	1	0	**3**	**8**	**1**
Florida State	0	0	0	1	0	0	0	**1**	**3**	**0**
WP: Alex Storako (19–0) LP: Kathryn Sandercock (28–4) Sv: Jordy Bahl (4); Home runs: OKLA: Cydney Sanders, Grace Lyons; FSU: Mack Leonard; Attendance: 12,195; Boxscore

=== All-tournament Team ===
The following players were members of the Women's College World Series All-Tournament Team.

Position	Player	School
P	**Jordy Bahl (MOP)**	Oklahoma
P	NiJaree Canady	Stanford
P	Kathryn Sandercock	Florida State
2B	Tiare Jennings	Oklahoma
3B	Zaida Puni	Tennessee
OF	Rylie Boone	Oklahoma
OF	Taylor Gindlesperger	Stanford
OF	Kiki Milloy	Tennessee
OF	Kaley Mudge	Florida State
C	Michaela Edenfield	Florida State
C	Kinzie Hansen	Oklahoma
U	Jayda Coleman	Oklahoma

== Record by conference ==
Conference	# of Bids	Record	Win %	RF	SR	WS	NS	F	NC
Big 12	4	20–6	.769	3	3	2	1	1	1
ACC	6	18–14	.563	4	3	1	1	1	–
Pac-12	6	23–14	.622	5	4	3	1	–	–
SEC	12	33–26	.559	10	3	2	1	–	–
Mountain West	1	4–2	.667	1	1	–	–	–	–
Big Ten	4	9–8	.529	3	1	–	–	–	–
Sun Belt	2	5–5	.500	1	1	–	–	–	–
Conference USA	2	5–4	.556	2	–	–	–	–	–
Southland	1	3–2	.600	1	–	–	–	–	–
MAC	1	2–2	.500	1	–	–	–	–	–
ASUN	2	3–4	.429	1	–	–	–	–	–
American	2	2–4	.333	–	–	–	–	–	–
Big South	1	1–2	.333	–	–	–	–	–	–
Patriot	1	1–2	.333	–	–	–	–	–	–
Summit	1	1–2	.333	–	–	–	–	–	–
WAC	1	1–2	.333	–	–	–	–	–	–
West Coast	1	1–2	.333	–	–	–	–	–	–
Big West	2	1–4	.200	–	–	–	–	–	–
America East	1	0–2	.000	–	–	–	–	–	–
Atlantic 10	1	0–2	.000	–	–	–	–	–	–
Big East	1	0–2	.000	–	–	–	–	–	–
Big Sky	1	0–2	.000	–	–	–	–	–	–
CAA	1	0–2	.000	–	–	–	–	–	–
Horizon	1	0–2	.000	–	–	–	–	–	–
Ivy League	1	0–2	.000	–	–	–	–	–	–
MAAC	1	0–2	.000	–	–	–	–	–	–
MEAC	1	0–2	.000	–	–	–	–	–	–
Missouri Valley	1	0–2	.000	–	–	–	–	–	–
NEC	1	0–2	.000	–	–	–	–	–	–
Ohio Valley	1	0–2	.000	–	–	–	–	–	–
SoCon	1	0–2	.000	–	–	–	–	–	–
SWAC	1	0–2	.000	–	–	–	–	–	–

== Media coverage ==
=== Radio ===
For the third consecutive year Westwood One provided nationwide radio coverage of every game in the Women's College World Series. Ryan Radtke and Leah Amico returned as two of the broadcasters. Chris Plank and Destinee Martinez worked select games, while Radtke and Amico called the Championship Series while Taylor Davis worked as a field reporter.

=== Television ===
ESPN held exclusive rights to the tournament. The network aired games across ABC, ESPN, ESPN2, ESPNU, ESPN+, SEC Network, Longhorn Network, and ACC Network. For just the sixth time in the history of the women's softball tournament, ESPN covered every regional.

==== Broadcast assignments ====
Regionals

- Norman: Jenn Hildreth & Carol Bruggeman
- Los Angeles: Clay Matvick & Natasha Watley
- Tallahassee: Courtney Lyle & Danielle Lawrie
- Knoxville: Mike Couzens & Kayla Braud
- Tuscaloosa: Roy Philpott & Aleshia Ocasio
- Stillwater: Matt Schumaker & Erin Miller
- Seattle: Maura Sheldon & Nicole Mendes
- Durham: Angel Gray & Raine Wilson

Super Regionals

- Norman: Eric Frede & Madison Shipman
- Tallahassee: Courtney Lyle & Danielle Lawrie
- Knoxville: Beth Mowins, Jessica Mendoza, Michele Smith, & Holly Rowe
- Tuscaloosa: Mike Couzens & Kayla Braud

Women's College World Series

- Kevin Brown, Amanda Scarborough & Courtney Lyle (afternoons & late games)
- Beth Mowins, Jessica Mendoza, Michele Smith & Holly Rowe (primetime)

Regionals

- Stanford: Mark Neely & Amanda Scarborough
- Baton Rouge: Alex Perlman & Francesca Enea
- Fayetteville: Drew Carter & Jenny Dalton-Hill
- Evanston: Tyler Denning & Jennie Ritter
- Austin: Alex Loeb & Cat Osterman
- Athens: Chuckie Kempf & Brittany McKinney
- Salt Lake City: Kevin Fitzgerald & Kenzie Fowler
- Clemson: Eric Frede & Madison Shipman

Super Regionals

- Stillwater: Kevin Brown & Amanda Scarborough
- Seattle: Mark Neely & Carol Bruggeman
- Durham: Pam Ward & Jenny Dalton-Hill
- Salt Lake City: Tiffany Greene & Erin Miller

Women's College World Series Finals

- Beth Mowins, Jessica Mendoza, Michele Smith & Holly Rowe
