= Duke Blue Devils softball =

Duke Blue Devils
- 2026 Duke Blue Devils softball season
- University: Duke University
- Head coach: Marissa Young (9th season)
- Conference: ACC
- Location: Durham, North Carolina, US
- Home stadium: Duke Softball Stadium
- Nickname: Blue Devils
- Colors: Duke blue and white

NCAA WCWS appearances
- 2024

NCAA super regional appearances
- 2022, 2023, 2024, 2026

NCAA Tournament appearances
- 2021, 2022, 2023, 2024, 2025, 2026

Conference tournament championships
- 2021, 2024

Regular-season conference championships
- 2024

The Duke Blue Devils softball is the program that joined the Atlantic Coast Conference as a Division I varsity program in 2017. In July 2015, former Big Ten Player of the Year Marissa Young was named as Duke University's first head softball coach. Young spent the previous two years as an assistant coach at the University of North Carolina.

== History ==
=== Coaching history ===
Years	Coach	Record	%
2018–present	Marissa Young	306–124	.712

== Coaching staff ==
Name	Position coached	Consecutive season at Duke in current position
Marissa Young	Head coach	9th
Olivia Watkins	Associate Head Coach	5th
Taylor Wike	Associate Head Coach	4th
Jala Wright	Assistant coach	1st

== Year-by-year record ==
Record table
Season	Team	Overall	Conference	Standing	Postseason
Marissa Young (Atlantic Coast Conference) (2018–present)
2018	Marissa Young	29–27	13–11	6th (Coastal)	
2019	Marissa Young	25–31	11–13	3rd (Coastal)	
2020	Marissa Young	23–4	1–2	T-9th (Coastal)	Season cancelled due to COVID-19 pandemic
2021	Marissa Young	44–12	26–10	3rd (ACC)	Athens Regional
2022	Marissa Young	44–11	19–3	2nd (ACC)	Los Angeles Super Regional
2023	Marissa Young	48–12	19–5	2nd (ACC)	Durham Super Regional
2024	Marissa Young	52–9	20–4	1st (ACC)	Women's College World Series
2025	Marissa Young	41–18	16–8	4th (ACC)	Durham Regional
2026	Marissa Young	43-17	20-4	2nd (ACC)	Fayetteville Super Regional
Marissa Young:		349–141 (.712)	145–60 (.707)		
Total:		349–141 (.712)			
National champion Postseason invitational champion Conference regular season champion Conference regular season and conference tournament champion Division regular season champion Division regular season and conference tournament champion Conference tournament champion

== Top player statistics ==
Duke softball boasts of several standout athletes who have made significant contributions to the team's success. Among them, Ana Gold has been an important player, starting at third base in all 59 games of the 2023 season. She showcased her power by hitting .313 with 19 home runs, 56 RBIs, and 10 stolen bases. Also, their pitcher Jala Wright has established herself as one of the top arms in college softball, earning recognition for her performances, especially during the Durham Regional, where she pitched 13.2 innings to help the Blue Devils advance to the Super Regionals. Cassidy Curd and D'Auna Jennings also made the Softball America's Top 100 Player List.

== See also ==
- List of NCAA Division I softball programs
