= Virginia Tech Hokies softball =

- Founded: 1996; 30 years ago
- University: Virginia Polytechnic Institute and State University
- Head coach: Pete D'Amour (5th season)
- Conference: ACC; Coastal Division
- Location: Blacksburg, Virginia, US
- Home stadium: Tech Softball Park (capacity: 1,100)
- Nickname: Hokies
- Colors: Chicago maroon and burnt orange

NCAA WCWS appearances
- 2008

NCAA super regional appearances
- 2008, 2021, 2022

NCAA Tournament appearances
- 2005, 2006, 2007, 2008, 2012, 2013, 2014, 2015, 2019, 2021, 2022, 2023, 2024, 2025, 2026

Conference tournament championships
- 2007, 2008

Regular-season conference championships
- 2007, 2019, 2022 ACC Coastal; 2019

The Virginia Tech Hokies softball team is a college softball program that competes in NCAA Division I and the Atlantic Coast Conference. Their home games are played at Tech Softball Park. The team appeared in the NCAA Tournament in four successive seasons (2005–2008), were conference champions in 2007 and 2008, and advanced to the Women's College World Series in 2008. A big part of this success was the pitching of Angela Tincher, who had a historic career at Virginia Tech, becoming only the third person in NCAA Softball to record 2,000 career strikeouts. The Hokies also did what no other college has ever done, beating the U.S. Olympic Softball Team in a victory that ended Team USA's 12-year, 185-game winning streak. The Hokies won this game by a score of 1–0 and Tincher pitched a no hitter, and also allowing no balls to reach the outfield.

== Championships ==
=== Conference Championships ===
| Season | Conference | Record | Head coach |
|---|---|---|---|
| 2007 | Atlantic Coast Conference | 15–5 | Scot Thomas |
| 2019 | Atlantic Coast Conference | 20–4 | Pete D'Amour |
| 2022 | Atlantic Coast Conference | 21–2 | Pete D'Amour |

=== Conference Tournament Championships ===
| Year | Conference | Tournament Location | Head coach |
|---|---|---|---|
| 2007 | Atlantic Coast Conference | Tallahassee, FL | Scot Thomas |
| 2008 | Atlantic Coast Conference | College Park, MD | Scot Thomas |

== Awards and honors ==
=== National Awards ===
USA Softball Collegiate Player of the Year

- Angela Tincher, 2008

=== Conference Awards and Honors ===
Atlantic 10 Player of the Year

- Michelle Meadows, 2000

Atlantic 10 Freshman of the Year

- Ali Verbage, 1998
- Ashlee Dobbe, 1999

ACC Player of the Year

- Angela Tincher, 2006
- Keely Rochard, 2022

ACC Pitcher of the Year

- Angela Tincher, 2006, 2007, 2008
- Carrie Eberle, 2019
- Keely Rochard, 2021
- Keely Rochard, 2022

ACC Freshman of the Year

- Lauren Duff, 2016
- Kelsey Bennett, 2019
- Emma Lemley, 2022

Big East All Conference

- Amy Voorhees, 2001
- Shanel Garafalo, 2001
- Catherine Gilliam, 2001
- Clarisa Crowell, 2002
- Amy Voorhees, 2002
- Rachel Pacheco, 2003
- Kelly Brown, 2003
- Megan Evans, 2004
- Sarah Prosise, 2004
- Caitlin Murphy, 2004

=== All-Americans ===
- Michelle Meadows, 1998 - 2nd team
- Michelle Johnson, 1998 - 3rd team
- Michelle Meadows, 1999, 2000 - 1st team
- Ashlee Dobbe, 2002 - 1st team
- Angela Tincher, 2006 - 2nd team
- Angela Tincher, 2007, 2008 - 1st team
- Jenna Rhodes, 2009 - 3rd team
- Emma Ritter, 2024 - 1st team
- Addy Greene, 2024 - 1st team
- Cori McMillan, 2024 - 2nd team

== See also ==
- List of NCAA Division I softball programs
