= 2024 UCLA Bruins softball team =

American college softball season

2024 UCLA Bruins softball

NCAA Los Angeles Super Regional champion NCAA Los Angeles Regional champion Pac-12 Tournament champions Pac-12 champions

Women's College World Series, 1–2
- Conference: Pac-12 Conference
- Record: 43–12 (17–4 Pac-12)
- Head coach: Kelly Inouye-Perez (18th season)
- Home stadium: Easton Stadium

2024 Pac-12 Conference softball standings
	Conf.						Overall
Team	W		L		T	PCT	W		L		T	PCT
No. 6 UCLA ‍†‍‡‍^{y}	17	–	4	–	0	.810	43	–	12	–	0	.782
No. 7 Stanford ‍‍‍^{y}	17	–	7	–	0	.708	50	–	16	–	0	.758
No. 12 Washington ‍‍‍^{y}	13	–	10	–	0	.565	32	–	15	–	0	.681
No. 24 Oregon ‍‍‍^{y}	13	–	10	–	0	.565	30	–	21	–	0	.588
No. 18 Arizona ‍‍‍^{y}	13	–	11	–	0	.542	37	–	18	–	1	.670
Utah ‍‍‍^{y}	10	–	13	–	0	.435	35	–	22	–	0	.614
No. 19 California ‍‍‍^{y}	9	–	13	–	0	.409	37	–	19	–	0	.661
Oregon State ‍‍‍	9	–	15	–	0	.375	21	–	29	–	0	.420
Arizona State ‍‍‍	3	–	21	–	0	.125	20	–	31	–	0	.392
† – Conference champion ‡ – Tournament champion y – Invited to the NCAA Tournament; As of June 2, 2024; Rankings from NFCA/USA Today

The 2024 UCLA Bruins softball team represented the University of California, Los Angeles in the 2024 NCAA Division I softball season. The Bruins were coached by Kelly Inouye-Perez, in her eighteenth season as head coach. The Bruins played their home games at Easton Stadium and finished with a record of 43–12. They competed in the Pac-12 Conference, where they finished first with a 17–4 record.

The Bruins were invited to the 2024 NCAA Division I softball tournament, where they won the Los Angeles Regional and Super Regional to advance to the Women's College World Series. They finished tied for fifth place with a win against Alabama and losses to eventual champion Oklahoma and semifinalist Stanford.

== Previous season ==
In 2023, the Bruins finished 52–7, won the Pac-12 with a record of 21–3, and entered the NCAA tournament as the number 2 overall seed, having spent the entire season in the top 5 of the polls. They were eliminated after two losses at home, to Grand Canyon and Liberty, to lose their final three games including the championship game of the inaugural Pac-12 tournament.

== Personnel ==
=== Roster ===
2024 UCLA Bruins roster
Pitchers: 10 - Mackenzie Ficke - Junior; 23 - Taylor Tinsley - Sophomore; 51 - Jada Cecil - Junior; 55 - Kaitlyn Terry - Freshman; Catchers: 13 - Sharlize Palacios - (redshirt) Senior; 26 - Jayla Castro - Junior; 28 - Alexis Ramirez - Sophomore; 88 - Addison Mettler - Freshman	Infielders: 4 - Rylee Pinedo - Sophomore; 7 - Maya Brady - (redshirt) Senior; 11 - Seneca Curo - (redshirt) Senior; 15 - Jordan Woolery - Sophomore; 31 - Ramsey Suarez - Sophomore; Outfielders: 3 - Janelle Meoño - (redshirt) Senior; 30 - Lauren Hatch - Junior; 40 - Jadelyn Allchin - Graduate; 52 - Madison Pacini - (redshirt) Junior; 56 - Liesl Osteen - Freshman	Utility: 5 - Savannah Pola - Junior; 22 - Taylor Stephens - Junior; 24 - Thessa Malau'ulu - Senior; 25 - Mia McNulty - Freshman; 32 - Gabriela Jaquez - Sophomore; 43 - Megan Grant - Sophomore; 44 - Kate Blunt - Junior

=== Coaches ===
2024 UCLA Bruins softball coaching staff
- Kelly Inouye-Perez - Head coach - 18th season
- Lisa Fernandez - Associate head Coach - 26th season
- Kirk Walker - Assistant Coach - 23rd season
- Rob Schweyer - Assistant Coach - 1st season

== Schedule ==
Legend
	UCLA win
	UCLA loss
*	Non-Conference game

2024 UCLA Bruins softball game log
Regular season

February
Date	Opponent	Rank	Site/stadium	Score	Overall record	Pac-12 record
Feb 9	Maryland*	No. 10	Easton Stadium • Los Angeles, CA (Stacy Winsberg Memorial Tournament)	W 6–5	1–0	
Feb 9	No. 8 Texas*	No. 10	Easton Stadium • Los Angeles, CA (Stacy Winsberg Memorial Tournament)	L 2–3	1–1	
Feb 10	San Diego*	No. 10	Easton Stadium • Los Angeles, CA (Stacy Winsberg Memorial Tournament)	W 7–6	2–1	
Feb 10	No. 8 Texas*	No. 10	Easton Stadium • Los Angeles, CA (Stacy Winsberg Memorial Tournament)	L 0–16 ^{(5)}	2–2	
Feb 11	No. 9 Oklahoma State*	No. 10	Easton Stadium • Los Angeles, CA (Stacy Winsberg Memorial Tournament)	L 1–9 ^{(5)}	2–3	
Feb 16	vs No. 7 Florida State*	No. 19	Eddie C. Moore Complex • Clearwater, FL (Shriners Children's Clearwater Invitational)	W 14–10	3–3	
Feb 16	vs No. 4 Georgia*	No. 19	Eddie C. Moore Complex • Clearwater, FL (Shriners Children's Clearwater Invitational)	L 2–7	3–4	
Feb 23	vs Nebraska*	No. 19	Big League Dreams Sports Park • Cathedral City, CA (Mary Nutter Collegiate Classic)	W 9–8	4–3	
Feb 23	vs No. 24 Northwestern*	No. 19	Big League Dreams Sports Park • Cathedral City, CA (Mary Nutter Collegiate Classic)	W 1–0	5–3	
Feb 24	vs Illinois*	No. 19	Big League Dreams Sports Park • Cathedral City, CA (Mary Nutter Collegiate Classic)	W 10–2 ^{(5)}	6–3	
Feb 24	vs Baylor*	No. 19	Big League Dreams Sports Park • Cathedral City, CA (Mary Nutter Collegiate Classic)	L 3–5	6–4	
Feb 25	vs No. 5 Tennessee*	No. 19	Big League Dreams Sports Park • Cathedral City, CA (Mary Nutter Collegiate Classic)	W 6–2	7–4	

March
Date	Opponent	Rank	Site/stadium	Score	Overall record	Pac-12 record
Mar 1	vs Michigan*	No. 18	Anderson Family Field • Fullerton, CA (Judi Garman Classic)	W 10–0 ^{(6)}	8–4	
Mar 1	vs No. 13 Florida*	No. 18	Anderson Family Field • Fullerton, CA (Judi Garman Classic)	L 0–1	8–5	
Mar 2	vs Weber State*	No. 18	Anderson Family Field • Fullerton, CA (Judi Garman Classic)	W 8–0 ^{(6)}	9–5	
Mar 2	vs DePaul*	No. 18	Anderson Family Field • Fullerton, CA (Judi Garman Classic)	W 9–1 ^{(5)}	10–5	
Mar 3	vs San Jose State*	No. 18	Anderson Family Field • Fullerton, CA (Judi Garman Classic)	W 5–1	11–5	
Mar 8	Utah	No. 16	Easton Stadium • Los Angeles, CA	W 6–2	12–5	1–0
Mar 9	Utah	No. 16	Easton Stadium • Los Angeles, CA	W 6–5	13–5	2–0
Mar 10	Utah	No. 16	Easton Stadium • Los Angeles, CA	W 12–1 ^{(5)}	14–5	3–0
Mar 12	Rutgers*	No. 15	Easton Stadium • Los Angeles, CA	W 7–6	15–5	
Mar 16	Loyola Marymount*	No. 15	Easton Stadium • Los Angeles, CA	W 8–0 ^{(5)}	16–5	
Mar 16	Loyola Marymount*	No. 15	Easton Stadium • Los Angeles, CA	W 8–0 ^{(5)}	17–5	
Mar 22	at No. 8 Washington	No. 14	Husky Softball Stadium • Seattle, WA	L 5–6	17–6	3–1
Mar 23	at No. 8 Washington	No. 14	Husky Softball Stadium • Seattle, WA	L 4–6	17–7	3–2
Mar 24	at No. 8 Washington	No. 14	Husky Softball Stadium • Seattle, WA	W 6–0	18–7	4–2
Mar 28	No. 24 Oregon	No. 14	Easton Stadium • Los Angeles, CA	W 5–3	19–7	5–2
Mar 29	No. 24 Oregon	No. 14	Easton Stadium • Los Angeles, CA	W 6–3	20–7	6–2

April
Date	Opponent	Rank	Site/stadium	Score	Overall record	Pac-12 record
Apr 5	at Oregon State	No. 12	Kelly Field • Corvallis, OR	W 6–1	21–7	7–2
Apr 6	at Oregon State	No. 12	Kelly Field • Corvallis, OR	W 5–2	22–8	8–2
Apr 7	at Oregon State	No. 12	Kelly Field • Corvallis, OR	L 0–1	22–9	8–3
Apr 9	Cal State Fullerton*	No. 12	Easton Stadium • Los Angeles, CA	W 8–0 ^{(8)}	23–9	
Apr 12	No. 20 California	No. 12	Easton Stadium • Los Angeles, CA	W 3–1	24–9	9–3
Apr 19	at No. 5 Stanford	No. 12	Stanford Softball Stadium • Stanford, CA	W 1–0 ^{(9)}	25–9	10–3
Apr 20	at No. 5 Stanford	No. 12	Stanford Softball Stadium • Stanford, CA	W 9–3	26–9	11–3
Apr 21	at No. 5 Stanford	No. 12	Stanford Softball Stadium • Stanford, CA	W 2–0	27–9	12–3
Apr 23	at Long Beach State*	No. 9	LBSU Softball Complex • Long Beach, CA	W 5–2	28–9	
Apr 26	No. 19 Arizona	No. 9	Easton Stadium • Los Angeles, CA	W 10–2 ^{(5)}	29–9	13–3
Apr 27	No. 19 Arizona	No. 9	Easton Stadium • Los Angeles, CA	L 4–8	29–10	13–4
Apr 28	No. 19 Arizona	No. 9	Easton Stadium • Los Angeles, CA	W 11–7	30–10	14–4
Apr 30	at Cal State Northridge*	No. 7	Matador Diamond • Northridge, CA	W 14–5 ^{(5)}	31–10	

May
Date	Opponent	Rank	Site/stadium	Score	Overall record	Pac-12 record
May 3	at Arizona State	No. 7	Alberta B. Farrington Softball Stadium • Tempe, AZ	W 4–2	32–10	15–4
May 4	at Arizona State	No. 7	Alberta B. Farrington Softball Stadium • Tempe, AZ	W 12–1	33–10	16–4
May 5	at Arizona State	No. 7	Alberta B. Farrington Softball Stadium • Tempe, AZ	W 8–4	34–10	17–4

Postseason

Pac-12 Tournament
Date	Opponent	Rank (Seed)	Site/stadium	Score	Overall record	Reg record
May 9	(9) Arizona State	No. 6 (1)	Alberta B. Farrington Softball Stadium • Tempe, AZ	W 6–0	35–10	1–0
May 10	No. 18 (5) Arizona	No. 6 (1)	Alberta B. Farrington Softball Stadium • Tempe, AZ	W 6–5	36–10	2–0
May 11	(6) Utah	No. 6 (1)	Alberta B. Farrington Softball Stadium • Tempe, AZ	W 2–1	37–10	3–0

NCAA Los Angeles Regional
Date	Opponent	Rank (Seed)	Site/stadium	Score	Overall record	Reg record
May 17	Grand Canyon	No. 6 (6)	Easton Stadium • Los Angeles, CA	W 9–0 ^{(5)}	38–10	1–0
May 18	No. 15 Virginia Tech	No. 6 (6)	Easton Stadium • Los Angeles, CA	W 7–6	39–10	2–0
May 19	Grand Canyon	No. 6 (6)	Easton Stadium • Los Angeles, CA	W 9–1 ^{(9)}	40–10	3–0

NCAA Los Angeles Super Regional
Date	Opponent	Rank (Seed)	Site/stadium	Score	Overall record	SR record
May 23	No. 14 (11) Georgia	No. 6 (6)	Easton Stadium • Los Angeles, CA	W 8–0 ^{(6)}	41–10	1–0
May 24	No. 14 (11) Georgia	No. 6 (6)	Easton Stadium • Los Angeles, CA	W 6–1	42–10	2–0

NCAA Women's College World Series
Date	Opponent	Rank (Seed)	Site/stadium	Score	Overall record	WCWS Record
May 30	No. 19 (14) Alabama	No. 6 (6)	Devon Park • Oklahoma City, OK	W 4–1	43–10	1–0
June 1	No. 2 (2) Oklahoma	No. 6 (6)	Devon Park • Oklahoma City, OK	L 0–1	43–11	1–1
June 2	No. 8 (8) Stanford	No. 6 (6)	Devon Park • Oklahoma City, OK	L 1–3	43–12	1–2

== Ranking movements ==
Ranking movements Legend: ██ Increase in ranking ██ Decrease in ranking — = Not ranked
	Week															
Poll	Pre	1	2	3	4	5	6	7	8	9	10	11	12	13	14	Final
NFCA/USA Today	10	19	19	18	16	15	14	14	12	12	12	9	7	6	6	5
ESPN.com/USA Softball Collegiate Top 25	8	20	19	19	18	16	13	15	12	11	11	6	6	6	6	5
D1Softball	9	22	24	20	18	16	14	14	12	12	12	5	6	5	5*	5
Softball America	10	—	—	23	22	15	14	16	12	14	16	7	7	6	6*	5
