= Pac-12 Conference softball tournament =

- Sport: Softball
- Conference: Pac-12 Conference
- Number of teams: 9
- Format: Single-elimination tournament
- Current stadium: Boyd & Jill Smith Family Stadium
- Current location: Stanford, California
- Played: 2023–2024, 2027–present
- Last contest: 2024
- Current champion: UCLA
- Most championships: UCLA; Utah (1)

The Pac-12 Conference softball tournament is the conference tournament in softball for the Pac-12 Conference. The winner receives the conference's automatic bid to the NCAA Division I softball tournament. After several years of consideration, the tournament began in 2023 and temporarily ended the next year, when 10 of the 12 full members left for other conferences, leaving Oregon State as the only full member that sponsored softball. Pac-12 softball will resume play in the 2027 season, with Oregon State joined by six new softball-sponsoring full members.

== History ==
The Pac-12 was one of the few conferences to not host a conference tournament at the end of the regular season. The inaugural tournament was held in 2023 at Rita Hillenbrand Memorial Stadium in Tucson, Arizona. The Pac-12 softball tournament was a single-elimination tournament and all nine of the Pac-12 schools which field softball teams qualified for the tournament. The winner earned the Pac-12's automatic bid to the NCAA tournament.

The 2024 Pac-12 Conference tournament was the final tournament for the immediate future, as eight of the nine softball-sponsoring members of the Pac-12 Conference left for other conferences immediately after that season. Arizona, Arizona State, and Utah joined the Big 12 Conference. California and Stanford joined the Atlantic Coast Conference. Oregon, UCLA, and Washington joined the Big Ten Conference.

The remaining legacy members, Oregon State and non-softball Washington State, eventually brought in seven new full members in July 2026—Boise State, Colorado State, Fresno State, San Diego State, Texas State, Utah State, and non-softball Gonzaga.

== Champions ==
Year	School	Site	MVP
2023	Utah	Rita Hillenbrand Memorial Stadium • Tucson, Arizona	Mariah Lopez
2024	UCLA	Boyd & Jill Smith Family Stadium • Stanford, California	Sharlize Palacios

=== By school ===
School	Championships	Years
UCLA	1	2024
Utah	1	2023
Arizona	0	
Arizona State	0	
Boise State	0	
California	0	
Colorado State	0	
Fresno State	0	
Oregon	0	
Oregon State	0	
San Diego State	0	
Stanford	0	
Texas State	0	
Utah State	0	
Washington	0	

- Note: Former Pac-12 schools are in italics.
