= 2023 Oklahoma Sooners softball team =

American college softball team

2023 Oklahoma Sooners softball

National Champion NCAA Norman Super Regional champion NCAA Norman Regional champion Big 12 regular season and tournament champion
- Conference: Big 12 Conference
- Record: 61–1 (18–0 Big 12)
- Head coach: Patty Gasso (29th season)
- Home stadium: OU Softball Complex

2023 Big 12 Conference softball standings
| | Conf. | | | | | | Overall |
| Team | W | | L | | T | PCT | W | | L | | T | PCT |
|---|---|---|---|---|---|---|---|---|---|---|---|---|
| No. 1 Oklahoma ‍†‍‡‍^{y} | 18 | – | 0 | – | 0 | 1.000 | 61 | – | 1 | – | 0 | .984 |
| No. 8 Texas ‍‍‍^{y} | 11 | – | 7 | – | 0 | .611 | 45 | – | 15 | – | 1 | .746 |
| No. 9 Oklahoma State ‍‍‍^{y} | 10 | – | 8 | – | 0 | .556 | 47 | – | 16 | – | 0 | .746 |
| No. 18 Baylor ‍‍‍^{y} | 8 | – | 10 | – | 0 | .444 | 40 | – | 18 | – | 0 | .690 |
| Iowa State ‍‍‍ | 6 | – | 12 | – | 0 | .333 | 25 | – | 30 | – | 0 | .455 |
| Kansas ‍‍‍ | 5 | – | 13 | – | 0 | .278 | 25 | – | 27 | – | 0 | .481 |
| Texas Tech ‍‍‍ | 5 | – | 13 | – | 0 | .278 | 31 | – | 22 | – | 0 | .585 |
† – Conference champion ‡ – Tournament champion y – Invited to the NCAA tournament As of June 8, 2023; Rankings from NFCA/USA Today

The 2023 Oklahoma Sooners softball team was an American college softball team that represented the University of Oklahoma during the 2023 NCAA Division I softball season. The Sooners were led by Patty Gasso in her twenty-ninth season, and played their home games at OU Softball Complex. They competed in the Big 12 Conference, where they finished with a 61–1 record, including 18–0 in conference play. The Sooners only loss on the season was during an early season tournament in Waco, Texas, to the Baylor Bears, 3–4.

The Sooners won the 2023 Big 12 Tournament, and qualified for the 2023 NCAA Division I softball tournament. They advanced to the 2023 Women's College World Series, where they defeated Florida State in two games to win their seventh championship in program history, and third consecutive championship. They became the first team to three-peat since UCLA from 1988 to 1990. The season was also highlighted by setting an NCAA Division I softball-record 53-game winning streak.

== Previous season ==
The Sooners finished the 2022 season 59–3 overall, and 17–1 in the Big 12, finishing in first place in their conference. Following the conclusion of the regular season, the Sooners received an at-large bid to the 2022 NCAA Division I softball tournament, where they were the No. 1 overall seed. During the NCAA tournament they defeated Texas A&M in the regional finals and UCF in the super regionals. They won the 2022 Women's College World Series over Texas.

== Offseason ==
=== Departures ===
Oklahoma outgoing transfers
| Player | Position | Height | Year | New team | Ref |
|---|---|---|---|---|---|
| Turiya Coleman | Utility | 5'7" | Freshman | Houston | |
| Mackenzie Donihoo | Infielder | 5'3" | Junior | Tennessee | |

=== Additions ===
Oklahoma incoming transfers
| Player | Position | Height | Year | Previous team | Ref |
|---|---|---|---|---|---|
| Alex Storako | Pitcher | 5'11" | Redshirt senior | Michigan | |
| Haley Lee | Utility | 5'7" | Redshirt senior | Texas A&M | |
| Cydney Sanders | Infielder | 5'9" | Sophomore | Arizona State | |
| Alynah Torres | Utility | 5'9" | Senior | Arizona State | |

== Preseason ==
Oklahoma was ranked No. 1 in the nation in the preseason polls by NFCA/USA Today, ESPN.com/USA Softball, D1Softball and Softball America.

=== Award watch lists ===
| Award | Player | Position | Year | Ref |
|---|---|---|---|---|
| USA Softball Collegiate Player of the Year | Jordy Bahl | Pitcher | Sophomore | |
| USA Softball Collegiate Player of the Year | Jayda Coleman | Outfielder | Junior | |
| USA Softball Collegiate Player of the Year | Kinzie Hansen | Catcher | Senior | |
| USA Softball Collegiate Player of the Year | Tiare Jennings | Infielder | Junior | |
| USA Softball Collegiate Player of the Year | Haley Lee | Utility | Redshirt Senior | |
| USA Softball Collegiate Player of the Year | Grace Lyons | Infielder | Redshirt Senior | |
| USA Softball Collegiate Player of the Year | Cydney Sanders | Infielder | Sophomore | |
| USA Softball Collegiate Player of the Year | Alex Storako | Pitcher | Redshirt Senior | |

== Roster and personnel ==
2023 Oklahoma Sooners roster
| Pitchers: 8 – Alex Storako – Redshirt Senior; 11 – Kierston Deal – Freshman; 19 – Nicole May – Junior; 85 – SJ Geurin – Freshman; 98 – Jordy Bahl – Sophomore; Catchers: 9 – Kinzie Hansen – Senior; Outfielders: 0 – Rylie Boone – Senior; 24 – Jayda Coleman – Junior; 27 – Hannah Coor – Sophomore | Infielders: 1 – Cydney Sanders – Sophomore; 3 – Grace Lyons – Redshirt Senior; 23 – Tiare Jennings – Junior; 82 – Avery Hodge – Freshman; Utility: 7 – Jocelyn Erickson – Freshman; 17 – Sophia Nugent – Sophomore; 21 – Grace Green – Redshirt Senior; 33 – Alyssa Brito – Junior; 40 – Alynah Torres – Senior; 43 – Quincee Lilio – Redshirt Freshman; 45 – Haley Lee – Redshirt Senior |

2023 Oklahoma Sooners coaching staff
- Patty Gasso – Head coach
- Jennifer Rocha – Assistant head coach
- JT Gasso – Assistant coach
- Hannah Sparks – Volunteer assistant
- Ryan Wondrasek – Director of player development
- Hope Trautwein – Graduate assistant
- Lauren Foster – Graduate assistant

== Schedule ==
2023 Oklahoma Sooners softball game log
Regular season (49–1)

February (13–1)
| Date | Opponent | Rank | Site/stadium | Score | Win | Loss | Save | Attendance | Overall Record | Big 12 Record |
|---|---|---|---|---|---|---|---|---|---|---|
| February 9 | vs. No. 16 Duke; Mark Campbell Invitational | No. 1 | Bill Barber Park; Irvine, CA | 4–0 | **Bahl** (1–0) | Davidson (0–1) | — | 800 | 1–0 | – |
| February 9 | vs. Liberty; Mark Campbell Invitational | No. 1 | Bill Barber Park | 1–0 ^{(8)} | **May** (1–0) | Keeney (0–1) | — | 500 | 2–0 | – |
| February 10 | vs. No. 17 Stanford; Mark Campbell Invitational | No. 1 | Bill Barber Park | 10–1 ^{(6)} | **Storako** (1–0) | Krause (0–1) | — | 1,000 | 3–0 | – |
| February 11 | vs. No. 14 Washington; Mark Campbell Invitational | No. 1 | Bill Barber Park | 5–4 | **Bahl** (2–0) | Lopez (0–1) | **May** (1) | 1,000 | 4–0 | – |
| February 12 | vs. San Jose State; Mark Campbell Invitational | No. 1 | Bill Barber Park | 9–0 ^{(5)} | **Deal** (1–0) | Steffany (0–2) | — | 500 | 5–0 | – |
| February 17 | vs. Longwood | No. 1 | Getterman Stadium; Waco, TX | 10–0 ^{(5)} | **Bahl** (3–0) | Burton (0–3) | — | — | 6–0 | – |
| February 18 | vs. Stephen F. Austin | No. 1 | Getterman Stadium | 22–0 ^{(5)} | **Storako** (2–0) | Hannabas (1–2) | — | 1,240 | 7–0 | – |
| February 18 | vs. Army | No. 1 | Getterman Stadium | 9–0 ^{(5)} | **May** (2–0) | Grete (1–3) | — | 1,209 | 8–0 | – |
| February 19 | at Baylor | No. 1 | Getterman Stadium | 3–4 | Orme (3–1) | **Bahl** (3–1) | Binford (1) | 1,271 | 8–1 | – |
| February 24 | vs. Cal State Fullerton | No. 2 | Big League Dreams Complex; Cathedral City, CA | 8–0 ^{(5)} | **Storako** (3–0) | Miranda (2–2) | — | 2,000 | 9–1 | – |
| February 24 | vs. Texas A&M | No. 2 | Big League Dreams Complex | 8–0 ^{(5)} | **May** (3–0) | Preston (2–1) | — | 2,000 | 10–1 | – |
| February 25 | vs. Utah | No. 2 | Big League Dreams Complex | 10–3 | **Bahl** (4–1) | Sandez (4–1) | — | 1,500 | 11–1 | – |
| February 25 | vs. Loyola Marymount | No. 2 | Big League Dreams Complex | 10–1 ^{(5)} | **Deal** (2–0) | Perez (1–7) | — | 2,000 | 12–1 | – |
| February 26 | vs. No. 1 UCLA | No. 2 | Big League Dreams Complex | 14–0 ^{(5)} | **Storako** (4–0) | Faraimo (9–1) | — | — | 13–1 | – |

March (18–0)
| Date | Opponent | Rank | Site/stadium | Score | Win | Loss | Save | Attendance | Overall Record | Big 12 Record |
|---|---|---|---|---|---|---|---|---|---|---|
| March 3 | UIC | No. 1 | OU Softball Complex; Norman, OK | 5–0 | **May** (4–0) | Toniolo (0–7) | — | 1,944 | 14–1 | – |
| March 3 | No. 17 Kentucky | No. 1 | OU Softball Complex | 18–0 ^{(5)} | **Storako** (5–0) | Schoonover (6–1) | — | 1,944 | 15–1 | – |
| March 4 | No. 17 Kentucky | No. 1 | OU Softball Complex | 7–1 | **Bahl** (5–1) | Lacatena (3–1) | — | 1,800 | 16–1 | – |
| March 4 | UIC | No. 1 | OU Softball Complex | 9–0 ^{(5)} | **May** (5–0) | Ortiz (0–1) | — | 1,955 | 17–1 | – |
| March 10 | vs. Southeastern Louisiana | No. 1 | Nusz Park; Starkville, MS | 13-0 ^{(5)} | **Bahl** (6–1) | Comeaux (3–1) | — | 278 | 18–1 | – |
| March 10 | at Mississippi State | No. 1 | Nusz Park | 7–0 | **May** (6–0) | Maroon (7–1) | — | 1,056 | 19–1 | – |
| March 11 | at Mississippi State | No. 1 | Nusz Park | 9-3 | **Storako** (6–0) | Wesley (4–3) | — | 1,284 | 20–1 | – |
| March 13 | vs. South Dakota State | No. 1 | OU Softball Complex | 8–0 ^{(5)} | **May** (7–0) | Kniesche (8–3) | — | 1,706 | 21–1 | – |
| March 14 | No. 6 Florida State | No. 1 | OU Softball Complex | 5–4 | **Storako** (7–0) | DuBois (2–2) | **Bahl** (1) | 1,879 | 22–1 | – |
| March 17 | vs. Weber State | No. 1 | Hall of Fame Stadium; Oklahoma City, OK | 9–1 ^{(5)} | **Storako** (8–0) | Finch (1–1) | — | 4,627 | 23–1 | – |
| March 17 | vs. Northwestern | No. 1 | Hall of Fame Stadium | 2–1 | **May** (8–0) | Boyd (2–3) | — | 4,627 | 24–1 | – |
| March 18 | vs. Weber State | No. 1 | Hall of Fame Stadium | 16–0 ^{(5)} | **Storako** (9–0) | Johnson (5–9) | — | 5,185 | 25–1 | – |
| March 18 | vs. No. 19 Auburn | No. 1 | Hall of Fame Stadium | 14–0 ^{(5)} | **Bahl** (7–1) | Widra (7–1) | — | 5,185 | 26–1 | – |
| March 19 | vs. No. 19 Auburn | No. 1 | Hall of Fame Stadium | 7–1 | **Storako** (10–0) | Penta (11–4) | — | 4,172 | 27–1 | – |
| March 24 | at Iowa State | No. 1 | Cyclone Sports Complex; Ames, IA | 3–0 | **Storako** (11–0) | Spelhaug (1–4) | — | 1,074 | 28–1 | 1–0 |
| March 25 | at Iowa State | No. 1 | Cyclone Sports Complex | 13–3 ^{(5)} | **May** (9–0) | Swain (3–5) | — | 1,715 | 29–1 | 2–0 |
| March 25 | at Iowa State | No. 1 | Cyclone Sports Complex | 10–0 ^{(5)} | **Bahl** (8–1) | Johnson (1–3) | — | 1,715 | 30–1 | 3–0 |
| March 31 | No. 9 Texas | No. 1 | Hall of Fame Stadium | 8–1 | **Bahl** (9–1) | Czech (7–3) | — | 8,930 | 31–1 | 4–0 |

April (14–0)
| Date | Opponent | Rank | Site/stadium | Score | Win | Loss | Save | Attendance | Overall Record | Big 12 Record |
|---|---|---|---|---|---|---|---|---|---|---|
| April 1 | No. 9 Texas | No. 1 | OU Softball Complex | 4–3 | **Bahl** (10–1) | Gutierrez (10–2) | — | 1,976 | 32–1 | 5–0 |
| April 2 | No. 9 Texas | No. 1 | OU Softball Complex | 10–2 ^{(6)} | **May** (10–0) | Morgan (10–2) | — | 1,868 | 33–1 | 6–0 |
| April 6 | Texas Tech | No. 1 | OU Softball Complex | 3–0 | **Storako** (12–0) | Kuehl (1–1) | — | 1,864 | 34–1 | 7–0 |
| April 7 | Texas Tech | No. 1 | OU Softball Complex | 6–0 | **Bahl** (11–1) | Hoover (14–1) | — | 1,958 | 35–1 | 8–0 |
| April 8 | Texas Tech | No. 1 | OU Softball Complex | 7–0 | **May** (11–0) | Fritz (8–4) | — | 1,973 | 36–1 | 9–0 |
| April 11 | at No. 13 LSU | No. 1 | Tiger Park; Baton Rouge, LA | 3–0 | **Bahl** (12–1) | Berzon (11–3) | — | 3,073 | 37–1 | – |
| April 15 | vs. Louisville | No. 1 | Miami Softball Stadium; Oxford, OH | 10–1 ^{(5)} | **Storako** (13–0) | Felder (1–1) | — | 1,069 | 38–1 | – |
| April 15 | at Miami (OH) | No. 1 | Miami Softball Stadium | 13–1 ^{(6)} | **May** (12–0) | Pratt (18–10) | — | 1,069 | 39–1 | – |
| April 21 | at No. 16 Baylor | No. 1 | Getterman Stadium | 7–0 | **Bahl** (13–1) | Orme (14–6) | — | 1,250 | 40–1 | 10–0 |
| April 22 | at No. 16 Baylor | No. 1 | Getterman Stadium | 4–0 | **Storako** (14–0) | West (6–2) | **Bahl** (2) | 1,250 | 41–1 | 11–0 |
| April 22 | at No. 16 Baylor | No. 1 | Getterman Stadium | 2–0 | **May** (13–0) | Orme (14–7) | — | 1,250 | 42–1 | 12–0 |
| April 25 | at Wichita State | No. 1 | Wilkins Stadium; Wichita, KS | Cancelled | | | | | | |
| April 28 | Kansas | No. 1 | OU Softball Complex | 8–0 ^{(5)} | **Bahl** (14–1) | Hamilton (9–8) | — | 1,762 | 43–1 | 13–0 |
| April 29 | Kansas | No. 1 | OU Softball Complex | 14–0 ^{(5)} | **May** (14–0) | Ludwig (3–7) | — | 1,951 | 44–1 | 14–0 |
| April 30 | Kansas | No. 1 | OU Softball Complex | 8–2 | **Storako** (15–0) | Hamilton (9–9) | — | — | 45–1 | 15–0 |

May (4–0)
| Date | Opponent | Rank | Site/stadium | Score | Win | Loss | Save | Attendance | Overall Record | Big 12 Record |
|---|---|---|---|---|---|---|---|---|---|---|
| May 2 | at Tulsa | No. 1 | Collins Family Softball Complex; Tulsa, OK | 6–0 | **May** (15–0) | Nash (9–13) | **Storako** (1) | 1,000 | 46–1 | – |
| May 5 | at No. 7 Oklahoma State | No. 1 | Cowgirl Stadium; Stillwater, OK | 8–3 | **Bahl** (15–1) | Maxwell (14–4) | — | 1,602 | 47–1 | 16–0 |
| May 6 | at No. 7 Oklahoma State | No. 1 | Cowgirl Stadium | 4–2 | **Deal** (3–0) | Maxwell (14–5) | — | 1,753 | 48–1 | 17–0 |
| May 7 | at No. 7 Oklahoma State | No. 1 | Cowgirl Stadium | 5–1 | **Storako** (16–0) | Kilfoyl (12–5) | — | 1,565 | 49–1 | 18–0 |

Postseason (12-0)

Big 12 Tournament (2–0)
| Date | Opponent | Rank | Site/stadium | Score | Win | Loss | Save | Attendance | Overall Record | B12T Record |
|---|---|---|---|---|---|---|---|---|---|---|
| May 12 | Iowa State | No. 1 | Hall of Fame Stadium | 9–0 ^{(5)} | **Storako** (17–0) | Swain (5–9) | — | 3,739 | 50–1 | 1–0 |
| May 13 | No. 10 Texas | No. 1 | Hall of Fame Stadium | 6–1 | **May** (16–0) | Gutierrez (12–5) | **Bahl** (3) | 4,684 | 51–1 | 2–0 |

Norman Regional (3–0)
| Date | Opponent | Rank | Site/Stadium | Score | Win | Loss | Save | Attendance | Overall Record | Regional Record |
|---|---|---|---|---|---|---|---|---|---|---|
| May 19 | vs. Hofstra | No. 1 | OU Softball Complex | 11–0 ^{(5)} | **May** (17–0) | Apsel (10–9) | — | 1,925 | 52–1 | 1–0 |
| May 20 | vs. Missouri | No. 1 | OU Softball Complex | 11–0 ^{(6)} | **Bahl** (16–1) | Krings (13–12) | — | 1,977 | 53–1 | 2–0 |
| May 21 | vs. California | No. 1 | OU Softball Complex | 16–3 ^{(5)} | **Storako** (18–0) | Archer (10–10) | — | 1,931 | 54–1 | 3–0 |

Norman Super Regional (2–0)
| Date | Opponent | Rank | Site/Stadium | Score | Win | Loss | Save | Attendance | Overall Record | Super Reg. Record |
|---|---|---|---|---|---|---|---|---|---|---|
| May 26 | vs. No. 10 Clemson | No. 1 | OU Softball Complex | 9–2 | **Bahl** (17–1) | Cagle (25–7) | — | 1,979 | 55–1 | 1–0 |
| May 27 | vs. No. 10 Clemson | No. 1 | OU Softball Complex | 8–7 ^{(9)} | **Bahl** (18–1) | Cagle (25–8) | — | 2,127 | 56–1 | 2–0 |

Women's College World Series (5–0)
| Date | Opponent | Rank | Site/stadium | Score | Win | Loss | Save | Attendance | Overall Record | WCWS Record |
|---|---|---|---|---|---|---|---|---|---|---|
| June 1 | vs. No. 7 Stanford | No. 1 | Hall of Fame Stadium | 2–0 | **Bahl** (19–1) | Canady (16–2) | — | 12,379 | 57–1 | 1–0 |
| June 3 | vs. No. 4 Tennessee | No. 1 | Hall of Fame Stadium | 9–0 ^{(5)} | **Bahl** (20–1) | Pickens (9–7) | — | 12,468 | 58–1 | 2–0 |
| June 5 | vs. No. 7 Stanford | No. 1 | Hall of Fame Stadium | 4–2 ^{(9)} | **Bahl** (21–1) | Canady (17–3) | — | 12,071 | 59–1 | 3–0 |
| June 7 | vs. No. 3 Florida State | No. 1 | Hall of Fame Stadium | 5–0 | **Bahl** (22–1) | Leonard (2–2) | — | 12,142 | 60–1 | 4–0 |
| June 8 | vs. No. 3 Florida State | No. 1 | Hall of Fame Stadium | 3–1 | **Storako** (19–0) | Sandercock (28–4) | **Bahl** (4) | 12,195 | 61–1 | 5–0 |

- Win
- Loss
- Postponement
- Bold: Sooners team member
- Rankings from NFCA:
- (#) Tournament seedings in parentheses.

== Rankings ==
Ranking movements Legend: ██ Increase in ranking ██ Decrease in ranking
| | Week | | | | | | | | | | | | | | | |
| Poll | Pre | 1 | 2 | 3 | 4 | 5 | 6 | 7 | 8 | 9 | 10 | 11 | 12 | 13 | 14 | Final |
|---|---|---|---|---|---|---|---|---|---|---|---|---|---|---|---|---|
| NFCA / USA Today | 1 | 1 | 2 | 1 | 1 | 1 | 1 | 1 | 1 | 1 | 1 | 1 | 1 | 1 | 1 | 1 |
| Softball America | 1 | 1 | 2 | 1 | 1 | 1 | 1 | 1 | 1 | 1 | 1 | 1 | 1 | 1 | 1 | 1 |
| ESPN.com/USA Softball | 1 | 1 | 2 | 1 | 1 | 1 | 1 | 1 | 1 | 1 | 1 | 1 | 1 | 1 | 1 | 1 |
| D1Softball | 1 | 1 | 2 | 1 | 1 | 1 | 1 | 1 | 1 | 1 | 1 | 1 | 1 | 1 | 1 | 1 |
