= 2023 UCLA Bruins softball team =

American college softball season

2023 UCLA Bruins softball

Pac-12 regular season champion

NCAA Tournament, Los Angeles Regional
- Conference: Pac-12 Conference
- Record: 52–7 (21–3 Pac-12)
- Head coach: Kelly Inouye-Perez (17th season)
- Home stadium: Easton Stadium

2023 Pac-12 Conference softball standings
	Conf.						Overall
Team	W		L		T	PCT	W		L		T	PCT
No. 2 UCLA ‍†‍‍^{y}	21	–	3	–	0	.875	52	–	7	–	0	.881
No. 6 Washington ‍‍‍^{y}	16	–	8	–	0	.667	44	–	14	–	0	.759
No. 17 Utah ‍‍‡‍^{y}	15	–	9	–	0	.625	42	–	16	–	0	.724
No. 7 Stanford ‍‍‍^{y}	14	–	10	–	0	.583	47	–	15	–	0	.758
No. 19 Oregon ‍‍‍^{y}	14	–	10	–	0	.583	38	–	17	–	0	.691
California ‍‍‍^{y}	9	–	14	–	1	.396	35	–	21	–	1	.623
Oregon State ‍‍‍	6	–	17	–	1	.271	15	–	29	–	1	.344
Arizona ‍‍‍	6	–	18	–	0	.250	29	–	25	–	0	.537
Arizona State ‍‍‍	6	–	18	–	0	.250	22	–	26	–	0	.458
† – Conference champion ‡ – Tournament champion y – Invited to the NCAA Tournament; As of June 5, 2023; Rankings from NFCA/USA Today

The 2023 UCLA Bruins softball team represented the University of California, Los Angeles in the 2023 NCAA Division I softball season. The Bruins were coached by Kelly Inouye-Perez, in her seventeenth season. The Bruins played their home games at Easton Stadium and competed in the Pac-12 Conference.

== Previous season ==
The Bruins finished the 2022 season 51–10 overall, and 19–5 in the Pac-12 Conference, finishing in second place in their conference. Following the conclusion of the regular season, the Bruins received an at-large bid to the 2022 NCAA Division I softball tournament where they advanced to the semifinals of the Women's College World Series, before being eliminated by eventual tournament champion Oklahoma.

== Offseason ==
In August 2022, assistant head coaches Lisa Fernandez and Kirk Walker were promoted to associate head coaches.

== Preseason ==
=== Award watch lists ===
Award	Player	Position	Year	Ref.
USA Softball Collegiate Player of the Year	Maya Brady	Utility	Redshirt Junior	
USA Softball Collegiate Player of the Year	Megan Faraimo	Pitcher	Redshirt Senior	
USA Softball Collegiate Player of the Year	Sharlize Palacios	Catcher	Redshirt Junior	

== Roster and personnel ==
2023 UCLA Bruins roster
Pitchers: 8 – Megan Faraimo – (redshirt) Senior; 21 – Brooke Yanez – Sixth year; 32 – Taylor Tinsley – Freshman; 88 – Lauren Shaw – Graduate; Catchers: 13 – Sharlize Palacios – (redshirt) Junior; 18 – Sara Rusconi Vicinanza – Senior; 19 – Alyssa Garcia – (redshirt) Junior; 25 – Taylor Sullivan – (redshirt) Senior; 26 – Jayla Castro – Sophomore; Infielders: 4 – Rylee Pinedo – Freshman; 15 – Jordan Woolery – Freshman; 24 – Thessa Malau'ulu – Junior; 27 – Rachel Cid – Fifth year; 28 – Alexis Ramirez – Freshman; 31 – Ramsey Suarez – Freshman	Utility: 5 – Savannah Pola – Sophomore; 7 – Maya Brady – (redshirt) Junior; 10 – Kennedy Powell – Freshman; 11 – Seneca Curo – (redshirt) Junior; 20 – Anna Vines – (redshirt) Senior; 22 – Taylor Stephens – Sophomore; 43 – Megan Grant – Freshman; 44 – Kate Blunt – Sophomore; Outfielders: 3 – Janelle Meoño– (redshirt) Junior; 14 – Kelli Godin – (redshirt) Senior; 23 – Aaliyah Jordan – (redshirt) Graduate; 30 – Lauren Hatch – Sophomore; 94 – Lauryn Carter – Junior

2023 UCLA Bruins coaching staff
- Kelly Inouye-Perez – Head coach
- Lisa Fernandez – Associate head coach
- Kirk Walker – Associate head coach
- Will Oldham – Volunteer assistant coach

== Schedule ==
2023 UCLA Bruins softball game log
Regular season (50–4)

February (17–1)
Date	Opponent	Rank	Site/stadium	Score	Win	Loss	Save	Attendance	Overall Record	Pac-12 Record
February 9	Cal State Fullerton; Stacy Winsberg Tournament	No. 2	Easton Stadium; Los Angeles, CA	3–0	**Faraimo** (1–0)	Rainey (0–1)	—	673	1–0	–
February 10	Cal State Bakersfield; Stacy Winsberg Tournament	No. 2	Easton Stadium	18–1 ^{(5)}	**Shaw** (1–0)	Kennedy (0–1)	—	755	2–0	–
February 11	Loyola Marymount; Stacy Winsberg Tournament	No. 2	Easton Stadium	11–0 ^{(5)}	**Yanez** (1–0)	Caymol (0–1)	—	983	3–0	–
February 11	Cal State Bakersfield; Stacy Winsberg Tournament	No. 2	Easton Stadium	8–0 ^{(5)}	**Tinsley** (1–0)	Martinez (0–1)	—	1,075	4–0	–
February 12	San Diego; Stacy Winsberg Tournament	No. 2	Easton Stadium	14–0 ^{(5)}	**Faraimo** (2–0)	Giaime (0–1)	—	450	5–0	–
February 12	San Diego; Stacy Winsberg Tournament	No. 2	Easton Stadium	5–2	**Faraimo** (3–0)	Tadlock (0–1)	—	517	6–0	–
February 14	Liberty	No. 2	Easton Stadium	3–2	**Faraimo** (4–0)	Bachman (1–2)	—	250	7–0	–
February 16	vs. Nebraska; TaxAct Clearwater Invitational	No. 2	Eddie C. Moore Complex; Clearwater, FL	8–0 ^{(6)}	**Yanez** (2–0)	Harness (1–1)	—	2,518	8–0	–
February 17	vs. Alabama; TaxAct Clearwater Invitational	No. 2	Eddie C. Moore Complex	5–3	**Faraimo** (5–0)	Fouts (2–1)	—	—	9–0	–
February 18	vs. No. 6 Florida State; TaxAct Clearwater Invitational	No. 2	Eddie C. Moore Complex	6–4	**Faraimo** (6–0)	Sandercock (2–1)	—	—	10–0	–
February 18	vs. No. 8 Virginia Tech; TaxAct Clearwater Invitational	No. 2	Eddie C. Moore Complex	8–4	**Yanez** (3–0)	Peck (1–1)	—	—	11–0	–
February 19	vs. Louisiana; TaxAct Clearwater Invitational	No. 2	Eddie C. Moore Complex	4–3	**Faraimo** (7–0)	Schorman (2–2)	—	1,032	12–0	–
February 23	vs. No. 3 Florida; Mary Nutter Collegiate Classic	No. 1	Big League Dreams Complex; Cathedral City, CA	10–0 ^{(6)}	**Faraimo** (8–0)	Trlicek (4–1)	—	—	13–0	–
February 24	vs. No. 18 Kentucky; Mary Nutter Collegiate Classic	No. 1	Big League Dreams Complex	6–3	**Yanez** (4–0)	Harrison (1–1)	**Faraimo** (1)	—	14–0	–
February 24	vs. Iowa; Mary Nutter Collegiate Classic	No. 1	Big League Dreams Complex	2–1	**Faraimo** (9–0)	Adams (2–2)	—	—	15–0	–
February 25	vs. No. 19 Northwestern; Mary Nutter Collegiate Classic	No. 1	Big League Dreams Complex	2–1	**Yanez** (5–0)	Supple (1–2)	—	—	16–0	–
February 25	vs. Texas A&M; Mary Nutter Collegiate Classic	No. 1	Big League Dreams Complex	3–0	**Tinsley** (2–0)	Kennedy (3–1)	—	—	17–0	–
February 26	vs. No. 2 Oklahoma; Mary Nutter Collegiate Classic	No. 1	Big League Dreams Complex	0–14 ^{(5)}	Storako (4–0)	**Faraimo** (9–1)	—	—	17–1	–

March (13–3)
Date	Opponent	Rank	Site/stadium	Score	Win	Loss	Save	Attendance	Overall Record	Pac-12 Record
March 3	vs. UCF; Judi Garman Classic	No. 2	Anderson Family Field; Fullerton, CA	2–1	**Yanez** (6–0)	Jewell (2–2)	—	—	18–1	–
March 3	vs. Fresno State; Judi Garman Classic	No. 2	Anderson Family Field	8–1	**Faraimo** (10–1)	Neiss (1–3)	—	—	19–1	–
March 4	vs. Cal Poly; Judi Garman Classic	No. 2	Anderson Family Field	16–0 ^{(5)}	**Tinsley** (3–0)	Ramuno (5–3)	—	—	20–1	–
March 4	vs. Michigan; Judi Garman Classic	No. 2	Anderson Family Field	8–0 ^{(5)}	**Faraimo** (11–1)	LeBeau (5–5)	—	—	21–1	–
March 5	at Cal State Fullerton; Judi Garman Classic	No. 2	Anderson Family Field	6–2	**Yanez** (7–0)	Miranda (3–3)	—	—	22–1	–
March 7	Howard	No. 2	Easton Stadium	4–0	**Tinsley** (4–0)	Weber (1–4)	**Faraimo** (2)	1,086	23–1	–
March 10	at California	No. 2	Levine-Fricke Field; Berkeley, CA	4–0	**Yanez** (8–0)	Archer (5–2)	—	693	24–1	1–0
March 11	at California	No. 2	Levine-Fricke Field	0–8 ^{(5)}	Halajian (2–1)	**Tinsley** (4–1)	—	832	24–2	1–1
March 12	at California	No. 2	Levine-Fricke Field	10–1 ^{(6)}	**Yanez** (9–0)	Archer (6–3)	—	849	25–2	2–1
March 14	Syracuse	No. 3	Easton Stadium	Cancelled						
March 17	No. 10 Washington	No. 3	Easton Stadium	3–4	Meylan (10–1)	**Yanez** (9–1)	—	1,085	25–3	2–2
March 18	No. 10 Washington	No. 3	Easton Stadium	4–0	**Faraimo** (12–1)	Lynch (5–2)	—	1,117	26–3	3–2
March 19	No. 10 Washington	No. 3	Easton Stadium	10–2 ^{(6)}	**Faraimo** (13–1)	Meylan (10–2)	—	943	27–3	4–2
March 24	at No. 19 Oregon	No. 3	Jane Sanders Stadium; Eugene, OR	0–3	Scott (5–3)	**Faraimo** (13–2)	—	1,655	27–4	4–3
March 25	at No. 19 Oregon	No. 3	Jane Sanders Stadium	7–4	**Faraimo** (14–2)	Hansen (12–4)	—	1,989	28–4	5–3
March 26	at No. 19 Oregon	No. 3	Jane Sanders Stadium	4–0	**Faraimo** (15–2)	Scott (5–3)	—	1,824	29–4	6–3
March 28	at Nevada	No. 3	Christina M. Hixson Softball Park; Reno, NV	Cancelled						
March 31	No. 6 Stanford	No. 3	Easton Stadium	4–0	**Faraimo** (16–2)	Vawter (12–2)	—	1,348	30–4	7–3

April (17–0)
Date	Opponent	Rank	Site/stadium	Score	Win	Loss	Save	Attendance	Overall Record	Pac-12 Record
April 1	No.6 Stanford	No. 3	Easton Stadium	2–1	**Faraimo** (17–2)	Krause (8–3)	—	1,209	31–4	8–3
April 2	No. 6 Stanford	No. 3	Easton Stadium	4–0	**Tinsley** (5–1)	Vawter (12–3)	**Yanez** (1)	1,132	32–4	9–3
April 4	at UC San Diego	No. 3	Triton Softball Field; San Diego, CA	10–1 ^{(6)}	**Yanez** (10–1)	Thompson (2–5)	—	503	33–4	–
April 6	Oregon State	No. 3	Easton Stadium	6–2	**Faraimo** (18–2)	Stepto (4–10)	—	847	34–4	10–3
April 7	Oregon State	No. 3	Easton Stadium	11–0 ^{(5)}	**Yanez** (11–1)	Garcia (3–7)	—	868	35–4	11–3
April 8	Oregon State	No. 3	Easton Stadium	6–0	**Faraimo** (19–2)	Stepto (4–11)	—	1,057	36–4	12–3
April 14	at No. 24 Arizona	No. 2	Hillenbrand Stadium; Tucson, AZ	8–0	**Faraimo** (20–2)	Silva (2–2)	—	2,970	37–4	13–3
April 15	at No. 24 Arizona	No. 2	Hillenbrand Stadium	8–4	**Faraimo** (21–2)	Silva (2–3)	—	2,866	38–4	14–3
April 16	at No. 24 Arizona	No. 2	Hillenbrand Stadium	14–5 ^{(5)}	**Faraimo** (22–2)	Netz (11–12)	—	2,874	39–4	15–3
April 19	at Long Beach State	No. 2	LBSU Softball Complex; Long Beach, CA	10–0 ^{(5)}	**Tinsley** (6–1)	Haddad (9–8)	—	772	40–4	–
April 21	Arizona State	No. 2	Easton Stadium	7–3	**Faraimo** (23–2)	Osborne (4–11)	—	1,046	41–4	16–3
April 22	Arizona State	No. 2	Easton Stadium	9–1 ^{(6)}	**Yanez** (12–1)	Schuld (2–4)	—	1,156	42–4	17–3
April 23	Arizona State	No. 2	Easton Stadium	4–1	**Faraimo** (24–2)	Magee (3–3)	—	1,325	43–4	18–3
April 25	at Cal State Northridge	No. 2	Matador Diamond; Northridge, CA	7–2	**Yanez** (13–1)	Carranco (4–7)	—	452	44–4	–
April 28	at No. 23 Utah	No. 2	Dumke Family Softball Stadium; Salt Lake City, UT	3–0	**Faraimo** (25–2)	Lopez (14–3)	—	1,100	45–4	19–3
April 29	at No. 23 Utah	No. 2	Dumke Family Softball Stadium	10–1 ^{(6)}	**Yanez** (14–1)	Sandez (12–5)	—	1,300	46–4	20–3
April 30	at No. 23 Utah	No. 2	Dumke Family Softball Stadium	11–3	**Faraimo** (26–2)	Lopez (14–5)	—	1,914	47–4	21–3

May (3–0)
Date	Opponent	Rank	Site/stadium	Score	Win	Loss	Save	Attendance	Overall Record	Pac-12 Record
May 1	at BYU	No. 2	Gail Miller Field; Provo, UT	7–2	**Yanez** (15–1)	Korth (15–7)	—	619	48–4	–
May 5	Loyola Marymount	No. 2	Easton Stadium	6–0	**Faraimo** (27–2)	Perez (12–10)	—	968	49–4	–
May 5	San Diego State	No. 2	Easton Stadium	4–3	**Faraimo** (28–2)	Light (10–6)	—	968	50–4	–

Post-Season (2–3)

Pac-12 Tournament (2–1)
Date	Opponent	Rank	Site/stadium	Score	Win	Loss	Save	Attendance	Overall Record	Pac-12T Record
May 11	Arizona	No. 2	Hillenbrand Stadium	4–3	**Faraimo** (29–2)	Netz (16–16)	—	2,492	51–4	1–0
May 12	No. 7 Stanford	No. 2	Hillenbrand Stadium	1–0	**Yanez** (16–1)	Vawter (17–8)	—	2,434	52–4	2–0
May 13	No. 21 Utah	No. 2	Hillenbrand Stadium	4–7	Lopez (18–5)	**Yanez** (16–2)	—	2,548	52–5	2–1

Los Angeles Regional (0–2)
Date	Opponent	Rank	Site/Stadium	Score	Win	Loss	Save	Attendance	Overall Record	Regional Record
May 19	vs. Grand Canyon	No. 2	Easton Stadium	2–3	Darwin (9–3)	**Faraimo** (29–3)	Thompson (3)	—	52–6	0–1
May 20	vs. Liberty	No. 2	Easton Stadium	1–2	Keeney (26–11)	**Yanez** (16–3)	—	—	52–7	0–2

- Win
- Loss
- Postponement
- Bold: Bruins team member
- Rankings from NFCA:
- (#) Tournament seedings in parentheses.

== Rankings ==
Ranking movements Legend: ██ Increase in ranking ██ Decrease in ranking
	Week																
Poll	Pre	1	2	3	4	5	6	7	8	9	10	11	12	13	14	15	Final
NFCA / USA Today	2	2	1	2	2	3	3	3	3	2	2	2	2	2	2		
Softball America	4	2	1	2	2	4	5	5	3	2	2	2	2	2	2		
ESPN.com/USA Softball	2	2	1	2	2	3	4	4	3	2	2	2	2	2	2		
D1Softball	2	2	1	2	2	3	4	4	3	2	2	2	2	2	2		
