= 2023 Oregon State Beavers softball team =

American college softball season

2023 Oregon State Beavers softball
- Conference: Pac-12 Conference
- Record: 10–18–1 (1–7–1 Pac-12)
- Head coach: Laura Berg (11th season)
- Associate head coach: Eric Leyba (5th season)
- Assistant coach: Jamie Wiggins (1st season)
- Home stadium: Kelly Field

2023 Pac-12 Conference softball standings
	Conf.						Overall
Team	W		L		T	PCT	W		L		T	PCT
No. 2 UCLA ‍†‍‍^{y}	21	–	3	–	0	.875	52	–	7	–	0	.881
No. 6 Washington ‍‍‍^{y}	16	–	8	–	0	.667	44	–	14	–	0	.759
No. 17 Utah ‍‍‡‍^{y}	15	–	9	–	0	.625	42	–	16	–	0	.724
No. 7 Stanford ‍‍‍^{y}	14	–	10	–	0	.583	47	–	15	–	0	.758
No. 19 Oregon ‍‍‍^{y}	14	–	10	–	0	.583	38	–	17	–	0	.691
California ‍‍‍^{y}	9	–	14	–	1	.396	35	–	21	–	1	.623
Oregon State ‍‍‍	6	–	17	–	1	.271	15	–	29	–	1	.344
Arizona ‍‍‍	6	–	18	–	0	.250	29	–	25	–	0	.537
Arizona State ‍‍‍	6	–	18	–	0	.250	22	–	26	–	0	.458
† – Conference champion ‡ – Tournament champion y – Invited to the NCAA Tournament; As of June 5, 2023; Rankings from NFCA/USA Today

The 2023 Oregon State Beavers softball team represented Oregon State University in the 2023 NCAA Division I softball season as members of the Pac-12 Conference. The Beavers were led by head coach Laura Berg in her eleventh season and played their home games at Kelly Field.

== Preseason ==
Following the Beavers second Women's College World Series appearance they entered the 2023 season ranked in the Top-25 preseason polls by Softball America and USA Softball. Assistant coach Eric Leyba was promoted to associate head coach and Jamie Wiggins joined the coaching staff.

== Roster ==
2023 Oregon State Beavers softball team
Players
Coaches

#	Pos.	Name	Bats/throws	Height	Year	Home town
1	INF	Aubree Seaney	R/L	5 ft 9 in (1.75 m)	So	Montverde, FL
2	C	Des Rivera	R/R	5 ft 6 in (1.68 m)	So	Chino, CA
3	OF	Erin Mendoza	L/R	5 ft 4 in (1.63 m)	So	Lakewood, CA
4	C	Abby Doerr	R/L	5 ft 9 in (1.75 m)	Jr	Coburg, OR
6	INF	Savanah Whatley	R/L	5 ft 5 in (1.65 m)	So	Oakley, CA
7	INF	Kaiea Higa	R/R	—	Fr	Maple Valley, WA
8	OF	Kinzy Brown	R/R	5 ft 8 in (1.73 m)	Fr	La Grande, OR
9	OF	Shay McDowell	R/R	5 ft 6 in (1.68 m)	Fr	Roseville, CA
10	U	Jenna Birch	R/R	5 ft 4 in (1.63 m)	Fr	Loomis, CA
11	OF	Morgan Howey	R/R	5 ft 4 in (1.63 m)	Fr	Arcadia, CA
12	OF	Eliana Gottlieb	L/L	5 ft 7 in (1.7 m)	So	Newport Beach, CA
13	INF	Carson Saabye	R/R	5 ft 7 in (1.7 m)	Jr	Monument, CO
14	P	Tarni Stepto	R/R	6 ft 0 in (1.83 m)	Jr	North Curl Curl, Australia
17	INF	Grace Messmer	R/R	5 ft 7 in (1.7 m)	Jr	Cloverdale, Canada
18	U	Kiani Nakamura	R/R	5 ft 2 in (1.57 m)	So	Redmond, OR
20	U	Sydney Saenz	R/R	5 ft 6 in (1.68 m)	Fr	El Paso, TX
21	U	Charity Sevaaetasi	R/R	5 ft 6 in (1.68 m)	Jr	Auburn, WA
22	OF	Jade Soto	L/R	5 ft 2 in (1.57 m)	Jr	Fort Myers, FL
23	P	Chloe Moffitt	R/R	5 ft 10 in (1.78 m)	Jr	Half Moon Bay, CA
24	C	Lici Campbell	R/R	5 ft 8 in (1.73 m)	So	Vallejo, CA
26	RHP	Ellie Garcia	R/R	6 ft 0 in (1.83 m)	So	Chino, CA
29	INF	Kiki Escobar	R/R	5 ft 8 in (1.73 m)	So	Oxnard, CA
30	P	Sarah Haendiges	R/R	5 ft 9 in (1.75 m)	So	Upland, CA
33	U	Madison Simon	R/R	5 ft 6 in (1.68 m)	Jr	Irvine, CA
42	INF	Frankie Hammoude	R/R	5 ft 9 in (1.75 m)	Sr	Oakland, CA
44	C	Harleigh Braswell	L/R	5 ft 6 in (1.68 m)	So	Sutter Creek, CA
77	INF	Madyson Clark	R/R	5 ft 4 in (1.63 m)	Fr	Claremont, CA
88	OF	Kristalyn Romulo	L/R	5 ft 5 in (1.65 m)	So	Cerritos, CA
99	U	Kali Blount	R/R	5 ft 11 in (1.8 m)	Fr	La Verne, CA

Head coach

Laura Berg

Assistant coach(es)

Eric Leyba
Jamie Wiggins

Legend

- (C) Team captain
- (S) Suspended
- (I) Ineligible
- Injured
- Current redshirt

Roster
Last update: Feb 19, 2023

== Schedule and results ==
2023 Oregon State Beavers softball game log
Regular season
February (7–8)

Date	Opponent	Rank	Site/stadium	Score	Win	Loss	Save	Overall	Pac-12
Feb 10	vs. New Mexico*	No. 19	Tiger Park • Baton Rouge, LA	2–0	**Haendiges (1–0)**	Linton (1–1)	None	1–0	
Feb 11	vs. New Mexico*	No. 19	Tiger Park • Baton Rouge, LA	0–8	Brinka (1–0)	**Garcia (0–1)**	None	1–1	
Feb 11	at No. 25 LSU*	No. 19	Tiger Park • Baton Rouge, LA	0–12	Berzon (1–0)	**Stepto (0–1)**	None	1–2	
Feb 12	vs. Nicholls*	No. 19	Tiger Park • Baton Rouge, LA	6–3	**Garcia (1–1)**	Yoo (0–2)	**Stepto (1)**	2–2	
Feb 12	at No. 25 LSU*	No. 19	Tiger Park • Baton Rouge, LA	0–3	Kilponen (2–0)	**Haendiges (1–1)**	None	2–3	
Feb 16	vs. Illinois State*		Alberta B. Farrington Softball Stadium • Tempe, AZ	1–0	**Haendiges (2–1)**	Ross (1–2)	None	3–3	
Feb 17	vs. BYU*		Alberta B. Farrington Softball Stadium • Tempe, AZ	2–3	Grey (3–2)	**Haendiges (2–2)**	None	3–4	
Feb 18	vs. Portland State*		Alberta B. Farrington Softball Stadium • Tempe, AZ	8–9	Korth (3–1)	**Stepto (0–2)**	None	3–5	
Feb 18	vs. Weber State*		Alberta B. Farrington Softball Stadium • Tempe, AZ	0–3	Johnson (3–2)	**Garcia (1–2)**	None	3–6	
Feb 19	vs. GCU*		GCU Softball Stadium • Phoenix, AZ	5–4	**Stepto (1–2)**	Thompson (2–1)	None	4–6	
Feb 24	vs. No. 24 Missouri*		Big League Dreams Complex • Cathedral City, CA	3–2	**Haendiges (3–2)**	Pannell (0–1)	None	5–6	
Feb 24	vs. CSUN*		Big League Dreams Complex • Cathedral City, CA	5–1	**Stepto (2–2)**	Carranco (0–2)	**Garcia (1)**	6–6	
Feb 25	vs. Cal State Fullerton*		Big League Dreams Complex • Cathedral City, CA	0–4	Sutherlin (4–1)	**Haendiges (3–3)**	None	6–7	
Feb 25	vs. Ohio State*		Big League Dreams Complex • Cathedral City, CA	0–6	Ruck (1–0)	**Stepto (2–3)**	None	6–8	
Feb 26	vs. Iowa*		Big League Dreams Complex • Cathedral City, CA	2–1	**Stepto (3–3)**	Greer (2–1)	None	7–8	

March (3–10–1)

Date	Opponent	Rank	Site/stadium	Score	Win	Loss	Save	Overall	Pac-12
Mar 2	vs. BYU*		Karl Brooks Stadium • St. George, UT	7–4	**Haendiges (4–3)**	Temples (2–3)	**Garcia (2)**	8–8	
Mar 3	vs. Utah Valley*		Karl Brooks Stadium • St. George, UT	3–2	**Garcia (5–3)**	Saili (1–3)	None	9–8	
Mar 3	at Utah Tech*		Karl Brooks Stadium • St. George, UT	0–1	Garton (5–1)	**Stepto (3–4)**	None	9–9	
Mar 4	vs. Idaho State*		Karl Brooks Stadium • St. George, UT	2–3	Newman (1–1)	**Stepto (3–5)**	Schuring (1)	9–10	
Mar 4	vs. UNLV*		Karl Brooks Stadium • St. George, UT	2–5	Zellien (2–1)	**Haendiges (4–4)**	None	9–11	
Mar 10	at Utah		Dumke Family Softball Stadium • Salt Lake City, UT	1–6^{6}	Sandy (9–1)	**Stepto (3–6)**	None	9–12	0–1
Mar 11	at Utah		Dumke Family Softball Stadium • Salt Lake City, UT	6–7	Lopez (7–2)	**Garcia (2–3)**	None	9–13	0–2
Mar 12	at Utah		Dumke Family Softball Stadium • Salt Lake City, UT	5–6	Sandez (10–1)	**Garcia (2–4)**	None	9–14	0–3
Mar 17	vs. California		Kelly Field • Corvallis, OR	2–1	**Stepto (4–6)**	Reimers (6–2)	None	10–14	1–3
Mar 18	vs. California		Kelly Field • Corvallis, OR	6–15	Halajian (3–1)	**Moffitt (0–1)**	None	10–15	1–4
Mar 19	vs. California		Kelly Field • Corvallis, OR	5–5	None	None	None	10–15–1	1–4–1
Mar 24	at No. 7 Stanford		Boyd & Jill Smith Family Stadium • Stanford, CA	1–9	Vawter (12–1)	**Stepto (4–7)**	None	10–16–1	1–5–1
Mar 25	at No. 7 Stanford		Boyd & Jill Smith Family Stadium • Stanford, CA	2–10	Krause (6–2)	**Garcia (2–5)**	None	10–17–1	1–6–1
Mar 26	at No. 7 Stanford		Boyd & Jill Smith Family Stadium • Stanford, CA	4–8	Vawter (13–1)	**Stepto (4–8)**	None	10–18–1	1–7–1
Mar 31	vs. Oregon		Kelly Field • Corvallis, OR						

April (0–0)

Date	Opponent	Rank	Site/stadium	Score	Win	Loss	Save	Overall	Pac-12
Apr 1	vs. Oregon		Kelly Field • Corvallis, OR						
Apr 2	vs. Oregon		Kelly Field • Corvallis, OR						
Apr 6	at UCLA		Easton Stadium • Los Angeles, CA						
Apr 7	at UCLA		Easton Stadium • Los Angeles, CA						
Apr 8	at UCLA		Easton Stadium • Los Angeles, CA						
Apr 14	vs. Washington		Kelly Field • Corvallis, OR						
Apr 15	vs. Washington		Kelly Field • Corvallis, OR						
Apr 16	vs. Washington		Kelly Field • Corvallis, OR						
Apr 28	at Arizona		Mike Candrea Field at Rita Hillenbrand Memorial Stadium • Tucson, AZ						
Apr 29	at Arizona		Mike Candrea Field at Rita Hillenbrand Memorial Stadium • Tucson, AZ						
Apr 30	at Arizona		Mike Candrea Field at Rita Hillenbrand Memorial Stadium • Tucson, AZ						

May (0–0)

Date	Opponent	Rank	Site/stadium	Score	Win	Loss	Save	Overall	Pac-12
May 5	vs. Arizona State		Kelly Field • Corvallis, OR						
May 6	vs. Arizona State		Kelly Field • Corvallis, OR						
May 7	vs. Arizona State		Kelly Field • Corvallis, OR						

- Win
- Loss
- Postponement/tie
- Bold: Oregon State team member
- Rankings from NFCA/USA Today
- (#) Tournament seedings in parentheses.
- * indicates a non-conference game.

== Rankings ==
Ranking movements Legend: ██ Increase in ranking ██ Decrease in ranking — = Not ranked
	Week														
Poll	Pre	1	2	3	4	5	6	7	8	9	10	11	12	13	Final
NFCA / USA Today	19	—	—	—	—	—									
Softball America	24	—	—	—	—	—									
ESPN.com/USA Softball	25	—	—	—	—	—									
D1Softball	—	—	—	—	—	—									
