= Amy Hogue =

American softball coach

Current position
- Title: Head coach
- Team: Utah
- Conference: Pac-12
- Record: 440–393–1 (.528)

Biographical details
- Born: Eugene, Oregon, U.S.
- Education: Utah

Playing career
- 1991–1994: Utah

Coaching career (HC unless noted)
- 1994–1995: Utah (Graduate asst.)
- 1994–1996: Alta HS (asst.)
- 1996–1999: Utah (asst.)
- 1999–2004: Salt Lake Community College
- 2008–present: Utah

Head coaching record
- Overall: 633–475–3 (.571)
- Tournaments: NCAA: 14–10 (.583)

Accomplishments and honors

Championships
- Pac-12 Tournament (2023)

Awards
- Pac-12 Coach of the Year (2015)

Amy Timmel Hogue is an American former collegiate All-American, professional softball second baseman and current head coach at Utah. Hogue played college softball at Utah and led them to two Women's College Word Series appearances. Hogue as a freshman player set the NCAA Division I single game record for at-bats (14) on May 11, 1991, during the longest game in NCAA softball history.

== Career ==
Hogue played college softball at Utah from 1991 to 1994 and led them to two Women's College Word Series appearances to bookend her career and was named the 1994 Western Athletic Conference Player of the Year. She is the current head coach at Utah. Hogue as a freshman player set the NCAA Division I single game record for at-bats (14) on May 11, 1991, during the longest game in NCAA softball history.

== Coaching career ==
=== Utah ===
On May 24, 2007, Amy Hogue was announced as the new head coach of the Utah softball program. She has mentored athletes such as Hannah Flippen and Anissa Urtez. She also guided the Utes to two back-to-back NCAA Super Regional appearances in 2016–17, as well as a Women's College World Series appearance in 2023, their first since Hogue guided them to the World Series in 1994.

== Statistics ==
=== Utah Utes ===
YEAR	G	AB	R	H	BA	RBI	HR	3B	2B	TB	SLG	BB	SO	SB	SBA
1991	42	152	27	41	.269	2	0	0	1	43	.283%	11	11	8	10
1992	45	164	20	49	.299	8	0	0	6	55	.335%	6	21	14	19
1993	45	165	23	48	.291	6	0	3	2	56	.339%	5	13	15	20
1994	62	222	55	101	.455	25	1	7	3	121	.545%	12	9	33	41
TOTALS	194	703	125	239	.340	41	1	10	12	274	.390%	34	54	70	90

== Head coaching record ==
=== College ===
Record table
Season	Team	Overall	Conference	Standing	Postseason
Salt Lake Community College (Scenic West Athletic Conference) (1999–2004)
2000	Salt Lake	38–16–1	20–4	1st	
2001	Salt Lake	37–14–1	20–8		
2002	Salt Lake	30–26	14–12		
2003	Salt Lake	42–10	32–4	1st	
2004	Salt Lake	46–16	31–9		NJCAA Division 1 Tournament
Salt Lake:		193–82–2 (.700)	117–37 (.760)		
Utah Utes (Mountain West Conference) (2008–2011)
2008	Utah	28–27	10–10	3rd	
2009	Utah	22–31	4–10	5th	
2010	Utah	26–29	4–11	5th	
2011	Utah	29–22	7–5	4th	
Utah Utes (Pac-12 Conference) (2012–2024)
2012	Utah	28–28	2–22	9th	
2013	Utah	24–30–1	7–17	9th	
2014	Utah	31–24	8–15	6th	
2015	Utah	36–19	12–11	4th	NCAA Regional
2016	Utah	35–22	13–10	4th	NCAA Super Regional
2017	Utah	37–16	13–9	5th	NCAA Super Regional
2018	Utah	20–30	2–21	9th	
2019	Utah	19–35	7–17	7th	
2020	Utah	14–4	0–0		Season canceled due to COVID-19
2021	Utah	22–33	3–21	9th	
2022	Utah	27–27	9–15	7th	
2023	Utah	42-16	15-9	3rd	Women's College World Series
2024	Utah	35-22	10-13	6th	NCAA Regionals
Utah:		475–415–1 (.534)	126–217 (.367)		
Utah Utes (Big 12 Conference) (2025–present)
2025	Utah	13–40	5-19	10th	
2026	Utah	35–20–1	10–13–1	7th	
Utah:		48–60–1 (.445)	15–32–1 (.323)		
Total:		716–557–4 (.562)			
National champion Postseason invitational champion Conference regular season champion Conference regular season and conference tournament champion Division regular season champion Division regular season and conference tournament champion Conference tournament champion
