= 2023 Texas Longhorns softball team =

2023 Texas Longhorns softball

NCAA Austin Regional Champion

NCAA Knoxville Super Regional, 0–2
- Conference: Big 12 Conference

Ranking
- Coaches: No. 10
- Record: 45–15–1 (11–7 Big 12)
- Head coach: Mike White (5th season)
- Assistant coaches: Steve Singleton (4th season); Kristen Zaleski (1st season); Molly Jacobsen (1st season)
- Home stadium: Red and Charline McCombs Field

2023 Big 12 Conference softball standings
	Conf.						Overall
Team	W		L		T	PCT	W		L		T	PCT
No. 1 Oklahoma ‍†‍‡‍^{y}	18	–	0	–	0	1.000	61	–	1	–	0	.984
No. 8 Texas ‍‍‍^{y}	11	–	7	–	0	.611	45	–	15	–	1	.746
No. 9 Oklahoma State ‍‍‍^{y}	10	–	8	–	0	.556	47	–	16	–	0	.746
No. 18 Baylor ‍‍‍^{y}	8	–	10	–	0	.444	40	–	18	–	0	.690
Iowa State ‍‍‍	6	–	12	–	0	.333	25	–	30	–	0	.455
Kansas ‍‍‍	5	–	13	–	0	.278	25	–	27	–	0	.481
Texas Tech ‍‍‍	5	–	13	–	0	.278	31	–	22	–	0	.585
† – Conference champion ‡ – Tournament champion y – Invited to the NCAA tournament As of June 8, 2023; Rankings from NFCA/USA Today

The 2023 Texas Longhorns softball team represented the University of Texas at Austin during the 2023 NCAA Division I softball season. The Longhorns played their home games at Red and Charline McCombs Field as a member of the Big 12 Conference. They were led by head coach Mike White in his fifth season at Texas.

== Previous season ==
Texas finished the 2022 season 47–22–1 overall and 12–6 in Big 12 Conference play. Texas also was the first unseeded team to ever reach the Women's College World Series finals.

=== Big 12 Tournament ===
Bracket

First Round; Thursday, May 11
4	Baylor	1
5	Iowa State	8
2	Texas	7^{(8)}
7	Texas Tech	6
3	Oklahoma State	7
6	Kansas	8

Semifinals; Friday, May 12
1	Oklahoma	9^{(5)}
5	Iowa State	0
2	Texas	9
6	Kansas	1

Championship; Saturday, May 13
1	Oklahoma	6
2	Texas	1

== Personnel ==
=== Roster ===
2023 Texas Longhorns Roster
Pitchers: 22 – Estelle Czech – junior; 45 – Logan Hulon – junior; 55 – Mac Morgan – sophomore; 77 – Citlaly Gutierrez – freshman; 99 – Sophia Simpson – sophomore	Catchers: 14 – Reese Atwood (Note: Plays two different positions) – freshman; 44 – Katie Cimusz – sophomore; Infielders: 10 – Mia Scott – sophomore; 11 – Alyssa Washington – junior; 14 – Reese Atwood – freshman; 15 – Courtney Day – junior; 23 – Viviana Martinez – freshman; 43 – Leighann Goode – freshman; 44 – Katie Cimusz – sophomore	Outfielders: 1 – Mya Holmes – sophomore; 5 – Jordyn Whitaker – junior; 6 – Bella Dayton – junior; 7 – Ashton Maloney - (redshirt) freshman; 9 – Lou Gilbert – senior; 16 – Alyssa Popelka – junior; Utility Players: 3 – Vanessa Quiroga – sophomore; 13 – Maddie Pomykalski – freshman; 27 – Baylea Brandon – sophomore; 28 – Camille Corona – junior; Designated Hitters: 5 – Jordyn Whitaker – junior; 15 – Courtney Day – junior

Roster Notes

=== Coaches ===
2023 Texas Longhorns coaching staff
- Mike White – Head coach – 5th year
- Steve Singleton – Associate head coach – 4th year
- Kristen Zaleski – Assistant coach – 1st year
- Molly Jacobsen – Volunteer assistant coach – 1st year

=== Support staff ===
2023 Texas Longhorns support staff
- Keely McMillon – Director of operations – 3rd year
- Kassi Hardee – Associate athletic trainer (Softball) – 6th year
- Melissa Schmitz – Assistant coach for athletic performance – 7th year
- Nick Williams – Video coordinator
- Hailey Dolcini – Graduate assistant – 1st year

== Offseason ==
=== Player departures ===
2023 Texas offseason departures
Name	Number	Pos.	Height	Year	Hometown	Notes	Source
Hailey Dolcini	27	P	6’0”	Senior	Ferndale, CA	Graduated	
Janae Jefferson	2	IF	5’4”	Senior	Humble, TX	Graduated	
Lauren Burke	00	UTL	5’7”	Senior	Eugene, OR	Graduated	
Mary Iakopo	33	C/1B	5’10”	Senior	Carson, CA	Graduated	
McKenzie Parker	9	IF	5’9”	Junior	Conroe, TX	Graduated	

Outgoing transfers

Name	B/T	Pos.	Height	Hometown	Year	New school	Source
Brianna Cantu	R/R	UTL	5’7”	League City, TX	Sophomore	Houston	
Carlee Ratcliff	R/R	UTL	5’5”	New Boston, TX	Sophomore	—	—
JJ Smith	R/L	C/1B	5’10”	Rosenberg, TX	Sophomore	Texas State	
Shea O’Leary	R/R	P	6’2”	Castaic, CA	Junior	UT Tyler	

=== Coaching staff departures ===
Name	Position	New Team	New Position	Source
Megan Bartlett	Assistant Coach	Arizona State	Head coach	

=== Incoming players ===
2022 Texas Signing Class
Name	B/T	Number	Pos.	Hometown	High School	Source
Citlaly Gutierrez	R/R	77	P	Stamford, TX	Stamford	
Leighann Goode	R/R	43	SS/2B	San Antonio, TX	Sandra Day O'Connor	
Maddie Pomykalski	R/R	13	UTL	Frankfort, IL	Lincoln-Way East	
Reese Atwood	R/R	14	C/1B	Sandia, TX	Tuloso-Midway	
Viviana Martinez	L/R	23	SS/2B	Tolleson, AZ	Tolleson Union	

Incoming transfers

Name	B/T	Pos.	Height	Hometown	Year	Previous school	Source
Baylea Brandon	L/L	Utility	5’6”	Leander, TX	Sophomore	LSU	
Mac Morgan	R/R	P	5’8”	Creighton, MO	Sophomore	Arizona State	

=== Coaching staff additions ===
Name	Position	Previous Team	Previous Position	Source
Kristen Zaleski	Assistant Coach	Oklahoma	Volunteer Assistant Coach	

== Preseason ==
=== Award watch lists ===
Listed in the order that they were released

Award	Player	Position	Year	Source
USA Softball Collegiate Player of the Year	Mia Scott	IF	Sophomore	

=== Big 12 media poll ===
Big 12 media poll
Predicted finish	Team	Votes (1st place)
1	Oklahoma	36 (6)
2	Oklahoma State	29 (1)
3	Texas	28
4	Baylor	20
5	Iowa State	16
6	Texas Tech	12
7	Kansas	6

=== Preseason All-Big 12 team ===
Preseason All-Big 12 Team
Name	Number	Position	Class	Source
Mia Scott	10	IF	Sophomore	

== Schedule and results ==
2023 Texas Longhorns softball game log (45–15–1)
Legend: = Win = Loss = Tie = Canceled Bold = Texas team member
Regular season (40–12–1)

February (11–2–1)
Date	Time (CT)	TV	Opponent	Rank	Stadium	Score	Win	Loss	Save	Attendance	Overall record	Big 12 Record	Box Score	Recap
NFCA Division I Leadoff Classic
February 10	3:00 p.m.	GameChanger	vs. Missouri* (Note: Neutral site, Texas is the designated visiting team)	No. 6	Eddie C. Moore Complex Field 1 • Clearwater, FL	11–1	**Morgan** (1–0)	Weber (0–1)	—	278	1–0	—	Box Score	Recap
February 10	5:30 p.m.	GameChanger	vs. No. 8 Northwestern*	No. 6	Eddie C. Moore Complex Field 1 • Clearwater, FL	9–10	Supple (1–0)	**Czech** (0–1)	—	345	1–1	—	Box Score	Recap
February 11	3:00 p.m.	GameChanger	vs. Illinois*	No. 6	Eddie C. Moore Complex Field 4 • Clearwater, FL	Postponed to February 12 due to inclement weather.								
February 11	5:30 p.m.	GameChanger	vs. No. 13 Tennessee* (Note: Neutral site, Texas is the designated home team)	No. 6	Eddie C. Moore Complex Field 3 • Clearwater, FL	Canceled due to inclement weather.								
February 12 (Note: Originally scheduled for February 11th, rescheduled to February 12 due to inclement weather.)	8:30 a.m.	GameChanger	vs. Illinois*	No. 6	Eddie C. Moore Complex Field 8 • Clearwater, FL	7–0	**Czech** (1–1)	McQueen (0–1)	—	117	2–1	—	Box Score	Recap
February 12	11:30 a.m.	GameChanger	vs. No. 20 Kentucky*	No. 6	Eddie C. Moore Complex Field 3 • Clearwater, FL	4–4	—	–	—	688	2–1–1	—	Box Score	Recap
February 15	6:00 p.m.	LHN	vs. Lamar*	No. 9	Red & Charline McCombs Field • Austin, TX	8–2	**Gutierrez** (1–0)	Ruiz (0–4)	—	1,297	3–1–1	—	Box Score	Recap
Texas Classic
February 17	3:00 p.m.	LHN	vs. Loyola (IL)*	No. 9	Red & Charline McCombs Field • Austin, TX	11–4	**Czech** (2–1)	Broniewicz (0–2)	—	1,388	4–1–1	—	Box Score	Recap
February 17	5:30 p.m.	LHN	vs. Omaha*	No. 9	Red & Charline McCombs Field • Austin, TX	7–6	**Morgan** (2–0)	Nuismer (3–1)	—	1,406	5–1–1	—	Box Score	Recap
February 18	3:00 p.m.	LHN	vs. Omaha*	No. 9	Red & Charline McCombs Field • Austin, TX	9–1 ^{(5)}	**Czech** (3–1)	Meyer (2–2)	—	1,534	6–1–1	—	Box Score	Recap
February 18	5:30 p.m.	LHN	vs. Loyola (IL)*	No. 9	Red & Charline McCombs Field • Austin, TX	6–5	**Gutierrez** (2–0)	Pepkowski (3–2)	—	1,560	7–1–1	—	Box Score	Recap
February 19	12:30 p.m.	LHN	vs. Incarnate Word*	No. 9	Red & Charline McCombs Field • Austin, TX	8–0 ^{(5)}	**Morgan** (3–0)	Garcia (2–1)	—	1,452	8–1–1	—	Box Score	Recap
Lone Star State Invitational
February 24	4:00 p.m.	LHN	vs. No. 10 Virginia Tech*	No. 9	Red & Charline McCombs Field • Austin, TX	5–6	Lemley (5–1)	**Gutierrez** (2–1)	—	1,386	8–2–1	—	Box Score	Recap
February 25	4:00 p.m.	LHN	vs. No. 10 Virginia Tech*	No. 9	Red & Charline McCombs Field • Austin, TX	8–2	**Morgan** (3–0)	Grein (3–1)	—	1,780	9–2–1	—	Box Score	Recap
February 25	6:30 p.m.	LHN	vs. Abilene Christian*	No. 9	Red & Charline McCombs Field • Austin, TX	8–0 ^{(5)}	**Simpson** (1–0)	Scheik (0–1)	—	1,821	10–2–1	—	Box Score	Recap
February 26	3:00 p.m.	LHN	vs. Texas Southern*	No. 9	Red & Charline McCombs Field • Austin, TX	22–0 ^{(5)}	**Gutierrez** (3–1)	Gendorf (0–4)	—	1,606	11–2–1	—	Box Score	Recap

March (15–4)
Date	Time (CT)	TV	Opponent	Rank	Stadium	Score	Win	Loss	Save	Attendance	Overall record	Big 12 Record	Box Score	Recap
March 1	6:00 p.m.	LHN	vs. North Texas*	No. 9	Red & Charline McCombs Field • Austin, TX	4–2	**Czech** (4–1)	Childers (0–1)	**Morgan** (1)	1,412	12–2–1	—	Box Score	Recap
Longhorn Invitational
March 3	4:30 p.m.	LHN	vs. Tennessee State*	No. 9	Red & Charline McCombs Field • Austin, TX	9–3	**Simpson** (2–0)	Manus (7–4)	**Gutierrez** (1)	1,590	13–2–1	—	Box Score	Recap
March 3	7:00 p.m.	LHN	vs. Louisiana*	No. 9	Red & Charline McCombs Field • Austin, TX	6–2	**Gutierrez** (4–1)	Schorman (4–3)	—	1,590	14–2–1	—	Box Score	Recap
March 4	12:00 p.m.	LHN	vs. McNeese*	No. 9	Red & Charline McCombs Field • Austin, TX	4–0	**Czech** (5–1)	Vallejo (4–5)	—	1,673	15–2–1	—	Box Score	Recap
March 4	2:30 p.m.	LHN	vs. Princeton*	No. 9	Red & Charline McCombs Field • Austin, TX	2–1	**Morgan** (5–0)	Laudenslager (1–3)	—	1,722	16–2–1	—	Box Score	Recap
March 5	12:30 p.m.	LHN	vs. Louisiana*	No. 9	Red & Charline McCombs Field • Austin, TX	8–3	**Gutierrez** (5–1)	Riassetto (0–1)	—	1,571	17–2–1	—	Box Score	Recap
March 8	6:00 p.m.	ESPN+	at UT Arlington*	No. 9	Allan Saxe Field • Arlington, TX	12–3	**Morgan** (6–0)	Bumpurs (3–5)	—	810	18–2–1	—	Box Score	Recap
Bevo Classic
March 10	1:30 p.m.	LHN	vs. Wisconsin*	No. 9	Red & Charline McCombs Field • Austin, TX	5–1	**Gutierrez** (5–1)	Monticelli (5–1)	—	1,592	19–2–1	—	Box Score	Recap
March 10	4:00 p.m.	LHN	vs. No. 13 Alabama*	No. 9	Red & Charline McCombs Field • Austin, TX	5–3	**Morgan** (7–0)	Fouts (9–2)	**Czech** (1)	1,623	20–2–1	—	Box Score	Recap
March 11	4:00 p.m.	LHN	vs. Wisconsin*	No. 9	Red & Charline McCombs Field • Austin, TX	7–4	**Czech** (6–1)	Salo (4–1)	**Simpson** (1)	1,834	21–2–1	—	Box Score	—
March 11	6:30 p.m.	LHN	vs. No. 13 Alabama*	No. 9	Red & Charline McCombs Field • Austin, TX	3–4	Fouts (10–2)	**Morgan** (7–1)	—	1,876	21–3–1	—	Box Score	—
March 12	3:00 p.m.	LHN	vs. Texas State*	No. 9	Red & Charline McCombs Field • Austin, TX	4–5 ^{(9)}	Mullins (11–4)	**Simpson** (2–1)	—	1,782	21–4–1	—	Box Score	Recap
March 14	6:30 p.m.	ESPN+	at Sam Houston State*	No. 11	Bearkat Softball Complex • Huntsville, TX	4–0	**Morgan** (8–1)	Wasik (0–4)	—	595	22–4–1	—	Box Score	Recap
South Florida Showdown
March 17	1:00 p.m.	—	vs. Marist*	No. 11	USF Softball Stadium • Tampa, FL	9–1 ^{(5)}	**Gutierrez** (7–1)	Pleasants (1–5)	—	–	23–4–1	—	Box Score	Recap
March 17	6:00 p.m.	ESPN+	at South Florida*	No. 11	USF Softball Stadium • Tampa, FL	3–4	Vivian (1–0)	**Czech** (6–2)	—	1,393	23–5–1	—	Box Score	Recap
March 18	1:00 p.m.	—	vs. Lehigh*	No. 11	USF Softball Stadium • Tampa, FL	7–0	**Gutierrez** (8–1)	Hess (6–2)	—	–	24–5–1	—	Box Score	Recap
March 18	6:00 p.m.	—	vs. Iowa*	No. 11	USF Softball Stadium • Tampa, FL	5–1	**Morgan** (9–1)	Adams (4–6)	**Gutierrez** (2)	1,907	25–5–1	—	Box Score	Recap
March 19	11:30 a.m.	ESPN+	at South Florida*	No. 11	USF Softball Stadium • Tampa, FL	6–1	**Czech** (7–2)	Kopko (0–2)	—	1,218	26–5–1	—	Box Score	Recap
March 22	6:00 p.m.	LHN	vs. Stephen F. Austin*	No. 10	Red & Charline McCombs Field • Austin, TX	13–2 ^{(5)}	**Morgan** (10–1)	Gainous (5–3)	—	1,274	27–5–1	—	Box Score	Recap
March 24	4:30 p.m.	LHN	vs. Texas Tech	No. 10	Red & Charline McCombs Field • Austin, TX	3–2	**Guiterrez** (9–1)	Fritz (7–2)	—	1,480	28–5–1	1–0	Box Score	Recap
March 25	12:00 p.m.	LHN	vs. Texas Tech	No. 10	Red & Charline McCombs Field • Austin, TX	4–3	**Simpson** (3–1)	Herzog (2–3)	—	1,603	29–5–1	2–0	Box Score	Recap
March 26	12:00 p.m.	LHN	vs. Texas Tech	No. 10	Red & Charline McCombs Field • Austin, TX	8–3	**Guiterrez** (10–1)	Carlin (2–3)	—	1,523	30–5–1	3–0	Box Score	Recap
March 31	6:00 p.m.	ESPN+	at Oklahoma	No. 9	USA Softball Hall of Fame Stadium • Oklahoma City, OK (Note: Game was originally scheduled for the OU Softball Complex in Norman, OK but was relocated to the USA Softball Hall of Fame Stadium in Oklahoma City, OK. The Saturday and Sunday games of the series will still be played in Norman. Texas will remain the Visiting team.)	1–8	Bahl (9–1)	**Czech** (7–3)	—	8,930 (Note: Set new all-time NCAA single game regular season attendance record. Previous record of 5,724 was set on March 14, 2000.)	30–6–1	3–1	Box Score	Recap

April (9–3)
Date	Time (CT)	TV	Opponent	Rank	Stadium	Score	Win	Loss	Save	Attendance	Overall record	Big 12 Record	Box Score	Recap
April 1	11:00 a.m.	ESPN2	at Oklahoma	No. 9	OU Softball Complex • Norman, OK	3–4	Bahl (10–1)	**Gutierrez** (10–2)	—	1,976	30–7–1	3–2	Box Score	Recap
April 2	11:00 a.m.	ESPN2	at Oklahoma	No. 9	OU Softball Complex • Norman, OK	2–10 ^{(6)}	May (10–0)	**Morgan** (10–2)	—	1,868	30–8–1	3–3	Box Score	Recap
April 6	4:00 p.m.	ESPN+	at Iowa State	No. 9	Cyclone Sports Complex • Ames, IA	8–0 ^{(5)}	**Morgan** (11–2)	Swain (4–7)	—	273	31–8–1	4–3	Box Score	Recap
April 7	4:00 p.m.	ESPN+	at Iowa State	No. 9	Cyclone Sports Complex • Ames, IA	8–1	**Czech** (8–3)	Charles (3–2)	—	657	32–8–1	5–3	Box Score	Recap
April 8	1:00 p.m.	ESPN+	at Iowa State	No. 9	Cyclone Sports Complex • Ames, IA	9–1	**Gutierrez** (11–2)	Ralston (3–5)	—	603	33–8–1	6–3	Box Score	Recap
April 12	6:00 p.m.	ESPN+	at Texas State	No. 8	Bobcat Softball Stadium • San Marcos, TX	4–0	**Morgan** (12–2)	McCann (6–5)	—	1,027	34–8–1	—	Box Score	Recap
April 14	6:00 p.m.	LHN	vs. Kansas	No. 8	Red & Charline McCombs Field • Austin, TX	**L** 3–9	Hamilton (8–6)	**Czech** **(8–4)**	—	1,496	34–9–1	6–4	Box Score	Recap
April 15	4:30 p.m.	LHN	vs. Kansas	No. 8	Red & Charline McCombs Field • Austin, TX	10–0 ^{(5)}	**Morgan** (13–2)	Brooks (4–5)	—	1,659	35–9–1	7–4	Box Score	Recap
April 16	12:00 p.m.	LHN	vs. Kansas	No. 8	Red & Charline McCombs Field • Austin, TX	3–2	**Morgan** (14–2)	Ludwig (2–5)	—	1,491	36–9–1	8–4	Box Score	Recap
April 20	8:00 p.m.	ESPN2	vs. No. 3 Oklahoma State	No. 7	Red & Charline McCombs Field • Austin, TX	Postponed to Doubleheader on April 22, due to rain.								
April 21	4:30 p.m.	LHN	vs. No. 3 Oklahoma State	No. 7	Red & Charline McCombs Field • Austin, TX	1–0 ^{(8)}	**Morgan** (15–2)	Kilfoyl (12–3)	—	1,474	37–9–1	9–4	Box Score	Recap
April 22	12:00 p.m.	LHN	vs. No. 3 Oklahoma State	No. 7	Red & Charline McCombs Field • Austin, TX	3–2	**Simpson** (4–1)	Maxwell (13–2)	—	1,543	38–9–1	10–4	Box Score	Recap
April 22	3:00 p.m.	LHN	vs. No. 3 Oklahoma State	No. 7	Red & Charline McCombs Field • Austin, TX	5–2	**Czech** (9–4)	Aycock (8–1)	**Morgan** (2)	1,569	39–9–1	11–4	Box Score	Recap
April 26	6:00 p.m.	LHN	vs. UTSA*	No. 5	Red & Charline McCombs Field • Austin, TX	Canceled due to expected severe thunderstorms.								

May (1-3)
Date	Time (CT)	TV	Opponent	Rank	Stadium	Score	Win	Loss	Save	Attendance	Overall record	Big 12 Record	Box Score	Recap
May 3	6:00 p.m.	LHN	vs. Sam Houston State*	No. 5	Red & Charline McCombs Field • Austin, TX	12–2 ^{(5)}	**Czech** (10–4)	Vento (3–6)	**Gutierrez** (3)	1,407	40–9–1	—	Box Score	Recap
May 5	6:00 p.m.	LHN	vs. No. 20 Baylor	No. 5	Red & Charline McCombs Field • Austin, TX	1–9 ^{(5)}	Crandall (14–4)	**Morgan** (15–3)	—	1,455	40–10–1	11–5	Box Score	Recap
May 6	6:00 p.m.	ESPN+	at No. 20 Baylor	No. 5	Getterman Stadium • Waco, TX	2–5	West (8–3)	**Gutierrez** (11–3)	—	1,250	40–11–1	11–6	Box Score	Recap
May 7	1:00 p.m.	ESPN+	at No. 20 Baylor	No. 5	Getterman Stadium • Waco, TX	1–2	Crandall (15–4)	**Gutierrez** (11–4)	—	1,250	40–12–1	11–7	Box Score	Recap

Postseason (5–3)

Big 12 Softball Tournament (2–1)
Date	Time (CT)	TV	Opponent	Seed	Stadium	Score	Win	Loss	Save	Attendance	Overall record	Tournament record	Box Score	Recap
May 11	1:40 p.m.	Big 12 Now	vs. (7) Texas Tech; First Round	(2) No. 10	USA Softball Hall of Fame Stadium • Oklahoma City, OK	7–6 ^{(8)}	**Gutierrez** (12–4)	Herzog (2–4)	—	–	41–12–1	1–0	Box Score	Recap
May 12	4:00 p.m.	Big 12 Now	vs. (6) Kansas; Semifinals	(2) No. 10	USA Softball Hall of Fame Stadium • Oklahoma City, OK	9–1 ^{(5)}	**Morgan** (16–3)	Brooks (5–6)	—	3,739	42–12–1	2–0	Box Score	Recap
May 13	12:00 p.m.	Big 12 Now	vs. (1) Oklahoma; Championship	(2) No. 10	USA Softball Hall of Fame Stadium • Oklahoma City, OK	1–6	May (16–0)	**Gutierrez** (12–4)	Bahl (3)	4,684	42–13–1	2–1	Box Score	Recap

Austin Regional (3–0)
Date	Time (CT)	TV	Opponent	Seed	Stadium	Score	Win	Loss	Save	Attendance	Overall record	Regional Record	Box Score	Recap
May 19	4:00 p.m.	LHN	vs. #4 Seton Hall	#1 (13) No. 8	Red & Charline McCombs Field • Austin, TX	**W** 8–0 (5)	**Morgan** **(17–3)** (Note: Texas pitchers Mac Morgan and Estelle Czech combined to throw a no-hitter versus Seton Hall. This was the first combined no-hitter by Texas in NCAA tournament play)	Smith (16–7)	—	1,633	43–13–1	1–0	Box Score	Recap
May 20	2:00 p.m.	ESPN	vs. #2 Texas A&M	#1 (13) No. 8	Red & Charline McCombs Field • Austin, TX	**W** 2–1	**Gutierrez** **(13–5)**	Preston (4–3)	**Simpson** **(2)**	1,643	44–13–1	2–0	Box Score	Recap
May 21	1:00 p.m.	ESPN2	vs. #2 Texas A&M (Note: Texas was the designated Visiting Team); Regional Final	#1 (13) No. 8	Red & Charline McCombs Field • Austin, TX	**W** 11–5	**Morgan** **(18–3)**	Ackerman (7–7)	—	1,663	45–13–1	3–0	Box Score	Recap

Knoxville Super Regional (0–2)
Date	Time (CT)	TV	Opponent	Seed	Stadium	Score	Win	Loss	Save	Attendance	Overall record	Super Regional Record	Box Score	Recap
May 26	3:00 p.m.	ESPN2	at (4) Tennessee	(13)	Sherri Parker Lee Stadium • Knoxville, TN	**L** 2–5	Rogers (18–1)	**Morgan** **(18–4)**	—	2,417	45–14–1	0–1	Box Score	Recap
May 27	2:00 p.m.	ABC	vs (4) Tennessee (Note: Texas was the designated Home Team)	(13)	Sherri Parker Lee Stadium • Knoxville, TN	**L** 0–9	Gottshall (16–1)	**Gutierrez** **(13–6)**	—	2,472	45–15–1	0–2	Box Score	Recap

* indicates a non-conference game. All rankings from NFCA/USA Today on the date of the contest. Source:

Schedule Notes

== Postseason ==
=== Big 12 Tournament ===
First Round; Thursday, May 11
4	Baylor	1
5	Iowa State	8
2	Texas	7^{(8)}
7	Texas Tech	6
3	Oklahoma State	7
6	Kansas	8

Semifinals; Friday, May 12
1	Oklahoma	9^{(5)}
5	Iowa State	0
2	Texas	9
6	Kansas	1

Championship; Saturday, May 13
1	Oklahoma	6
2	Texas	1

=== NCAA tournament ===
==== Austin Regional and Knoxville Super Regional ====
Round 1	Round 2
4	Tennessee	12^{(5)}
Northern Kentucky	0
4	Tennessee	9^{(5)}
Indiana	1
Indiana	4
Louisville	3
Knoxville Regional – Sherri Parker Lee Stadium
Northern Kentucky	1
Louisville	9^{(5)}
Indiana	4
Louisville	2
13	Texas	8^{(5)}
Seton Hall	0
13	Texas	2
Texas A&M	1
Texas A&M	2^{(8)}
Texas State	1
Austin Regional – Red and Charline McCombs Field
Seton Hall	3
Texas State	4
Texas A&M	4
Texas State	2

Regional Finals
4	Tennessee	7	—
Indiana	3	—
13	Texas	11	—
Texas A&M	5	—

Super Regionals
4	Tennessee	5	9	—
13	Texas	2	0	—

== Statistics ==
All Statistics through end of 2023 Season

=== Team batting ===
Team	AB	Avg.	H	2B	3B	HR	RBI	BB	SO	SB
Texas	1639	0.325	532	89	10	52	326	171	220	70
Opponents	1550	0.220	341	56	2	33	145	123	318	28

=== Team pitching ===
Team	IP	H	R	ER	BB	SO	SV	ERA
Texas	403.2	341	179	138	123	318	8	2.39
Opponents	381.0	532	370	287	171	220	1	5.27

=== Individual batting ===
Note: leaders must meet the minimum requirement of 2 PA/G and 75% of games played

Player	GP	AB	Avg.	H	2B	3B	HR	RBI	BB	SO	SB
Ashton Maloney	60	152	0.382	58	3	1	0	17	10	14	5
Mia Scott	61	199	0.377	75	15	2	2	32	24	18	19
Viviana Martinez	61	188	0.346	65	14	3	5	52	15	17	6
Bella Dayton	52	96	0.344	33	3	0	2	14	11	10	7
Leighann Goode	61	203	0.325	66	16	3	8	41	21	19	10
Courtney Day	54	130	0.308	40	7	0	7	31	22	29	2
Reese Atwood	58	172	0.291	50	8	0	11	43	3	29	1
Katie Cimusz	51	125	0.272	34	7	0	6	24	24	27	3
Vanessa Quiroga	29	47	0.383	18	4	0	3	11	6	10	0
Alyssa Popelka	50	72	0.361	26	0	0	0	5	5	11	9
Camille Corona	24	39	0.359	14	3	0	0	5	2	1	0
Baylea Brandon	23	30	0.300	9	2	0	3	8	7	6	0
Lou Gilbert	35	32	0.281	9	2	1	0	5	6	3	4
Alyssa Washington	42	113	0.239	27	4	0	4	27	11	14	4
Jordyn Whitaker	27	33	0.212	7	1	0	1	10	4	9	0
Mya Holmes	9	8	0.125	1	0	0	0	1	0	3	0

=== Individual pitching ===
Note: leaders must meet the minimum requirement of 1 IP/G

Player	GP	GS	W	L	IP	H	R	ER	BB	SO	SV	ERA
Citlaly Gutierrez	33	15	13	6	108.2	94	46	31	34	77	3	2.00
Mac Morgan	37	26	18	4	145.2	128	62	52	30	76	2	2.50
Estelle Czech	24	13	10	4	87.1	70	42	32	21	79	1	2.56
Sophia Simpson	26	7	4	1	62.0	49	29	23	38	86	2	2.60

Legend
GP	Games played	GS	Games started	AB	At-bats
H	Hits	Avg.	Batting average	2B	Doubles
3B	Triples	HR	Home runs	RBI	Runs batted In
IP	Innings pitched	W	Wins	L	Losses
ERA	Earned run average	SO	Strikeouts	BB	Base on balls
SV	Saves	SB	Stolen bases	High	Team high

== Rankings ==
Ranking movements Legend: ██ Increase in ranking ██ Decrease in ranking
	Week																
Poll	Pre	1	2	3	4	5	6	7	8	9	10	11	12	13	14	15	Final
NFCA / USA Today	6	9	9	9	9	11	10	9	9	8	7	5	5	10	8		
Softball America	9	16	18	15	14	14	14	10	14	13	10	8	6	10	10		
ESPN.com/USA Softball	9	13	13	11	10	9	8	8	10	8	7	5	5	7	8		
D1Softball	14	16	17	15	11	11	14	10	12	9	9	5	5	11	11		
