= 2023 Big 12 Conference softball tournament =

- Teams: 7
- Format: Single-elimination tournament
- Finals site: USA Softball Hall of Fame Stadium; Oklahoma City, Oklahoma
- Champions: Oklahoma (8th title)
- Runner-up: Texas
- Winning coach: Patty Gasso (8th title)
- MVP: Haley Lee (Oklahoma)

2023 Big 12 Conference softball standings
	Conf.						Overall
Team	W		L		T	PCT	W		L		T	PCT
No. 1 Oklahoma ‍†‍‡‍^{y}	18	–	0	–	0	1.000	61	–	1	–	0	.984
No. 8 Texas ‍‍‍^{y}	11	–	7	–	0	.611	45	–	15	–	1	.746
No. 9 Oklahoma State ‍‍‍^{y}	10	–	8	–	0	.556	47	–	16	–	0	.746
No. 18 Baylor ‍‍‍^{y}	8	–	10	–	0	.444	40	–	18	–	0	.690
Iowa State ‍‍‍	6	–	12	–	0	.333	25	–	30	–	0	.455
Kansas ‍‍‍	5	–	13	–	0	.278	25	–	27	–	0	.481
Texas Tech ‍‍‍	5	–	13	–	0	.278	31	–	22	–	0	.585
† – Conference champion ‡ – Tournament champion y – Invited to the NCAA tournament As of June 8, 2023; Rankings from NFCA/USA Today

The 2023 Big 12 Conference softball tournament was held at USA Softball Hall of Fame Stadium in Oklahoma City, Oklahoma from May 11 to May 13, 2023. As the tournament winner, Oklahoma earned the Big 12 Conference's automatic bid to the 2023 NCAA Division I softball tournament.

== Format ==
All seven teams were seeded based on conference winning percentage. They then played a single-elimination tournament, with the top seed receiving a single bye.

== Bracket ==
First Round; Thursday, May 11
4	Baylor	1
5	Iowa State	8
2	Texas	7^{(8)}
7	Texas Tech	6
3	Oklahoma State	7
6	Kansas	8

Semifinals; Friday, May 12
1	Oklahoma	9^{(5)}
5	Iowa State	0
2	Texas	9
6	Kansas	1

Championship; Saturday, May 13
1	Oklahoma	6
2	Texas	1

== Schedule ==
Game	Time*	Matchup^{#}	Score	Television
First Round – Thursday, May 11
1	10:00 a.m.	No. 5 Iowa State vs. No. 4 Baylor	8–1	Big 12 Now
2	12:30 p.m.	No. 7 Texas Tech vs. No. 2 Texas	6–7 ^{(8)}	Big 12 Now
3	3:00 p.m.	No. 6 Kansas vs. No. 3 Oklahoma State	8–7	Big 12 Now
Semifinals – Friday, May 12
4	1:00 p.m.	No. 5 Iowa State vs. No. 1 Oklahoma	0–9 ^{(5)}	ESPNU
5	4:00 p.m.	No. 6 Kansas vs. No. 2 Texas	1–9	Big 12 Now
Championship – Saturday, May 13
6	12:00 p.m.	No. 2 Texas vs. No. 1 Oklahoma	1–6	Big 12 Now
*Game times in CST. No. – Rankings denote tournament seed.

=== Championship game ===
May 13, 2023 – 12:00 p.m. (CDT) at USA Softball Hall of Fame Stadium in Oklahoma City, Oklahoma
Team	1	2	3	4	5	6	7	R	H	E
Texas	0	0	0	1	0	0	0	1	5	1
Oklahoma	0	1	0	3	0	2	x	6	7	0
WP: Nicole May (16–0) LP: Citlaly Gutierrez (12–5) Sv: Jordy Bahl (3); Home runs: TEX: Viviana Martinez; OKLA: Haley Lee; Attendance: 4,684; Boxscore

== All-Tournament Team ==
The following players were named to the all-tournament team:

Player	School
Angelina Allen	Iowa State
Ellie Spelhaug	Iowa State
Jordy Bahl	Oklahoma
Alyssa Brito	Oklahoma
Jayda Coleman	Oklahoma
Tiare Jennings	Oklahoma
Haley Lee (MOP)	Oklahoma
Grace Lyons	Oklahoma
Rachel Becker	Oklahoma State
Bella Dayton	Texas
Peyton Blythe	Texas Tech
