= Jordan Woolery =

American softball player (born 2004)

Utah Talons – No. 17
- Infielder
- Born: Concord, California, U.S.
- Bats: Right Throws: Right

Teams
- UCLA (2023–2026); Utah Talons (2026–present)

Career highlights and awards
- AUSL champion (2026); Softball America Player of the Year (2026); Big Ten Player of the Year (2026); Pac-12 Freshman of the Year (2023); WCWS All-Tournament Team (2026); 2× First team All-American (2025, 2026); Third team All-American (2023); 2× First team All-Big Ten (2025, 2026); 2× First team All-Pac 12 (2023, 2024); Pac-12 All-Freshman team (2023)

Jordan Rayne Woolery is an American professional softball player for the Utah Talons of the Athletes Unlimited Softball League (AUSL). She played college softball at UCLA and was named Softball America Player of the Year in 2026.

== High school career ==
Woolery attended Clayton Valley Charter High School where she played four years of softball and three years of basketball. During her freshman year she hit .600 with eight doubles, five home runs, one triple, 33 runs scored, and 27 run batted in (RBIs), and was named the Foothill League's Freshman of the Year honors. She was ranked as the No. 3 overall recruit in the nation by MaxPreps and Extra Inning Softball. She finished her career with a school-record .614 batting average, 113 hits and 21 home runs.

Woolery verbally committed to play college softball at UCLA when she was in eighth grade. On November 15, 2021, she officially signed with UCLA.

== College career ==
=== Freshman year ===
During her freshman year in 2023, she started 57 games and led all Pac-12 freshmen and ranked second on the team with a .390 batting average. She recorded 10 home runs, 12 doubles, 26 runs scored and 46 RBIs. She ranked second on the team with 20 multi-hit games, trailing only Maya Brady. On February 17, 2023, against Alabama, she recorded her first career home-run, a grand-slam off Montana Fouts. During conference play she hit .427 with a league-high tying 32 hits in 24 Pac-12 games. Following the season she was named to the Pac-12 All-Freshman team and first-team All-Pac 12, and NFCA Third Team All-American. She was also named the Pac-12 Freshman of the Year, a top-ten finalist for the NFCA National Freshman of the Year.

=== Sophomore year ===
During her sophomore year in 2024, she started all 55 games and recorded 10 home runs, seven doubles, one triple, 20 runs scored, 36 RBIs, along with a .314 batting average, .400 on-base percentage and .560 slugging percentage. On May 11, 2024, during the 2024 Pac-12 tournament championship game against Utah, she hit a home run to help UCLA win their first Pac-12 Conference softball tournament in program history. She was subsequently named to the all-tournament team. Following the season she was named to the first-team All-Pac 12 for the second consecutive year.

=== Junior year ===
During her junior year in 2025, she started all 68 games and recorded 23 home runs, 17 doubles, four triple, 57 runs scored, 86 RBIs, along with a .424 batting average, .475 on-base percentage and .677 slugging percentage. She ranked first in the Big Ten Conference in RBIs (86) and total bases (180), third in home runs (23) and hits (86), fourth in walks (43) and fifth in slugging percentage (.887). Following the season she was named to the first team All-Big Ten, an NFCA First Team All-American and USA Softball Collegiate Player of the Year top-ten finalist. On May 24, 2025, during game two of the 2025 NCAA Super Regionals against South Carolina, she hit a two-run, walk-off home run with UCLA down to its final out of the season to complete the largest seventh-inning comeback in program postseason history.

=== Senior year ===
During her senior year in 2026, she started 63 games and recorded 36 home runs, 17 doubles, 79 runs scored, 117 RBIs, along with a .497 batting average. On April 18, 2025, during a double-header against California, Woolery finished 6-for-7, with four home runs, 10 RBIs and five runs scored. Her first home run in game one was a three-run shot, setting a new single-season program RBI record, surpassing the previous record of 91 set by Stacey Nuveman in 1999. Her second home run of the day marked UCLA's 148th of the season, setting a Big Ten single-season team home run record. She finished game one 4-for-4 with a career-high seven RBIs, which is tied for third-most in a single game in UCLA history. With her 10 RBIs on the day, she became the fifth player in NCAA Division I history to recorded 100 RBIs in a single-season. She also became the second player in NCAA Division I history to record at least 30 home runs and 100 RBIs in the same season, following Laura Espinoza in 1995. She was subsequently named the Softball America and D1Softball National Player of the Week for the week ending April 21, 2026. Following the season she was named the Big Ten Player of the Year.

== Professional career ==
On May 4, 2026, Woolery was drafted sixth overall by the Utah Talons in the 2026 AUSL College Draft. On June 8, 2026, she signed a rookie contract with the Talons.

== Personal life ==
Woolery was born to Stephanie and Noel Belton. She is of African American and European descent.
