= 2024 Pac-12 Conference softball tournament =

- Teams: 9
- Format: Single-elimination tournament
- Finals site: Boyd & Jill Smith Family Stadium; Stanford, California
- Champions: UCLA (1st title)
- Runner-up: Utah (2nd title game)
- Winning coach: Kelly Inouye-Perez (1st title)
- MVP: Sharlize Palacios (UCLA)
- Television: Pac-12 Network; ESPN2; ESPNU

2024 Pac-12 Conference softball standings
	Conf.						Overall
Team	W		L		T	PCT	W		L		T	PCT
No. 6 UCLA ‍†‍‡‍^{y}	17	–	4	–	0	.810	43	–	12	–	0	.782
No. 7 Stanford ‍‍‍^{y}	17	–	7	–	0	.708	50	–	16	–	0	.758
No. 12 Washington ‍‍‍^{y}	13	–	10	–	0	.565	32	–	15	–	0	.681
No. 24 Oregon ‍‍‍^{y}	13	–	10	–	0	.565	30	–	21	–	0	.588
No. 18 Arizona ‍‍‍^{y}	13	–	11	–	0	.542	37	–	18	–	1	.670
Utah ‍‍‍^{y}	10	–	13	–	0	.435	35	–	22	–	0	.614
No. 19 California ‍‍‍^{y}	9	–	13	–	0	.409	37	–	19	–	0	.661
Oregon State ‍‍‍	9	–	15	–	0	.375	21	–	29	–	0	.420
Arizona State ‍‍‍	3	–	21	–	0	.125	20	–	31	–	0	.392
† – Conference champion ‡ – Tournament champion y – Invited to the NCAA Tournament; As of June 2, 2024; Rankings from NFCA/USA Today

The 2024 Pac-12 Conference softball tournament was held from May 8 through May 11, 2024 at Boyd & Jill Smith Family Stadium in Stanford, California. This was the second postseason championship event sponsored by the Pac-12 Conference since 1978, and the last for the immediate future, as 10 of the conference's previous 12 members, including all nine softball-sponsoring members, left for other conferences in August 2024. This left Oregon State as the only softball-sponsoring Pac-12 member (the other legacy member, Washington State, does not sponsor the sport).

As the tournament winner, UCLA earned the conference's automatic bid to the 2024 NCAA Division I softball tournament.

The tournament will resume in the 2027 season, with legacy softball member Oregon State joined by six new softball-sponsoring full members.

== Seeds ==
The tournament featured nine teams in this conference (Colorado, USC & Washington State do not field teams). Teams will play once per day at the 2024 Pac-12 Softball Championship. The four-day event began with a play-in game between the eighth and ninth-place teams in the regular-season standings. That winner advanced to an eight-team, single-elimination bracket with the quarterfinals, semifinals and championship being contested on the following three days. The winner of the Pac-12 Softball Championship received the conference's automatic bid to the NCAA tournament. The seedings were determined upon completion of regular season play. The winning percentage of the teams in conference play determined tournament seedings. There were tiebreakers in place to seed teams with identical conference records.

Seed	School	Conf.	Over.	Tiebreaker
#1	UCLA	17−4	34−10	―
#2	Stanford	17−7	42−12	―
#3	Oregon	13−10	28−18	2−1 vs Washington
#4	Washington	13−10	31−12	1−2 vs Oregon
#5	Arizona	13−11	33−15−1	―
#6	Utah	10−13	32−19	―
#7	California	9−13	36−16	―
#8	Oregon State	9−15	21−28	―
#9	Arizona State	3−21	19−30	―

== Bracket ==
Play-in Game; May 8
8	Oregon State	1
9	Arizona State	3

Quarterfinals; May 9
1	UCLA	6
9	Arizona State	0
4	Washington	3
5	Arizona	11
2	Stanford	4
7	California	2
3	Oregon	4
6	Utah	7

Semifinals; May 10
1	UCLA	6
5	Arizona	5
2	Stanford	1
6	Utah	2

Finals; May 11
1	UCLA	2
6	Utah	1

== Schedule ==
Game	Time*	Matchup^{#}	Score	Television	Attendance
Play-in Game – Wednesday, May 8
1	6:00 p.m.	No. 8 Oregon State vs. **No. 9 Arizona State**	1−3	Pac-12 Network	930
Quarterfinals – Thursday, May 9
2	10:00 a.m.	No. 3 Oregon vs. **No. 6 Utah**	4−7	Pac-12 Network	1,245
3	12:30 p.m.	**No. 2 Stanford** vs. No. 7 California	4−2	Pac-12 Network	1,245
4	4:00 p.m.	**No. 1 UCLA** vs. No. 9 Arizona State	6−0	Pac-12 Network	1,167
5	6:30 p.m.	No. 4 Washington vs. **No. 5 Arizona**	3−11	Pac-12 Network	1,167
Semifinals – Friday, May 10
6	4:30 p.m.	**No. 6 Utah** vs. No. 2 Stanford	2−1	ESPNU	TBD
7	7:30 p.m.	**No. 1 UCLA** vs. No. 5 Arizona	6−5	ESPN2	TBD
Championship – Saturday, May 11
8	7:00 p.m.	No. 6 Utah vs. **No. 1 UCLA**	1−2	ESPN2	TBD
*Game times in MST. # – Rankings denote tournament seed.

=== Team and tournament leaders ===
Hitting minimums - 75% of Games 2.5 TPA/Game Pitching minimums - 1.0 IP/Game Source:

Team	Avg.		RBI		Home Runs		Stolen Bases		ERA		Wins		Strikeouts		Saves	
Arizona	Olivia DiNardo	.714	Olivia DiNardo	6	Olivia DiNardo	2	Tayler Biehl	2	Miranda Stoddard	0.00	Brooke Mannon	1	Brooke Mannon	4	Aissa Silva	1
Arizona State	Libby Walsh	.500	Tied	1	None	0	Audrey LeClair	2	Deborah Jones	3.77	Deborah Jones	1	Deborah Jones	7	None	0
California	Tied	.333	Acacia Anders	1	None	0	Tied	1	Ryann Orange	0.00	None	0	Haylei Archer	3	None	
Oregon	Ariel Carlson	1.000	Tied	1	None	0	Tied	1	Elise Sokolsky	1.66	None	0	Tied	1	None	0
Oregon State	Kiki Escobar	.500	Lici Campbell	1	None	0	None	0	Logan Hulon	3.00	None	0	Logan Hulon	5	None	0
Stanford	Taryn Kern	.500	Taryn Kern	2	None	0	Aly Kaneshiro	1	NiJaree Canady	0.00	NiJaree Canady	1	NiJaree Canady	13	None	0
UCLA	Janelle Meono	.500	Tied	3	Sharlize Palacios	1	Tied	1	Kaitlyn Terry	3.11	Tied	1	Kaitlyn Terry	8	None	0
Utah	Kaylah Nelsen	.667	Kaylah Nelsen	4	Shonty Passi	1	Tied	1	Mariah Lopez	2.91	Tied	1	Mariah Lopez	8	Mariah Lopez	1
Washington	Giselle Alvarez	0.666	Alana Johnson	2	Tied	2	Brooklyn Carter	1	Sidne Peters	9.03	None	0	Sidne Peters	3	None	0

=== All-tournament Team ===
The following players will be members of the 2024 Pac-12 Softball All-Tournament Team. Player in Bold selected as Tournament MVP.

Position	Player	School
OF	Jadelyn Allchin	UCLA
P	NiJaree Canady	Stanford
1B	Olivia DiNardo	Arizona
INF	Taryn Kern	Stanford
P	Sarah Ladd	Utah
P	Mariah Lopez	Utah
OF	Kaylah Nelsen	Utah
C	**Sharlize Palacios**	UCLA
INF	Carlie Scupin	Arizona
P/OF	Kaitlyn Terry	UCLA
INF	Jordan Woolery	UCLA
