= Marita Hynes Field =

College softball stadium in Norman, Oklahoma

- Interactive map of Marita Hynes Field
- Location: Norman, Oklahoma; United States
- Coordinates: 35°11′42″N 97°26′31″W
- Owner: University of Oklahoma
- Operator: University of Oklahoma
- Capacity: 1,378

Construction
- Opened: 1998
- Closed: 2024

Tenants
- Oklahoma Sooners softball - (NCAA); 1994–2024

Marita Hynes Field at OU Softball Complex was a college softball stadium on the campus of the University of Oklahoma. It was the home venue of the Oklahoma Sooners softball team from 1998 through 2023, after which the Sooners moved to Love's Field. The playing surface was named for Marita Hynes on April 24, 2004. Hynes served as the second head coach of the Sooners and later as Senior Women's Administrator, and was instrumental in fundraising for the stadium.

The stadium was completed in 1998, and includes seating for 1,378. In 2005, the playing surface was named for Hynes, and in 2009 a player development facility was added.

Due to high demand for tickets, the University announced plans for a new stadium in 2018, with fundraising for the new 3,000-seat stadium underway as of 2019. In 2021, Oklahoma City-based Love's Travel Stops announced a $9 million donation (plus an agreement to match dollar-for-dollar an additional $3 million of donations) for the new field, which in turn will be named Love's Field.
