= 2023 Pac-12 Conference softball tournament =

- Teams: 9
- Format: Single-elimination tournament
- Finals site: Rita Hillenbrand Memorial Stadium; Tucson, Arizona
- Champions: Utah (1st title)
- Runner-up: UCLA (1st title game)
- Winning coach: Amy Hogue (1st title)
- MVP: Mariah Lopez (Utah)
- Attendance: 12,246
- Television: Pac-12 Network; ESPN2; ESPNU

2023 Pac-12 Conference softball standings
	Conf.						Overall
Team	W		L		T	PCT	W		L		T	PCT
No. 2 UCLA ‍†‍‍^{y}	21	–	3	–	0	.875	52	–	7	–	0	.881
No. 6 Washington ‍‍‍^{y}	16	–	8	–	0	.667	44	–	14	–	0	.759
No. 17 Utah ‍‍‡‍^{y}	15	–	9	–	0	.625	42	–	16	–	0	.724
No. 7 Stanford ‍‍‍^{y}	14	–	10	–	0	.583	47	–	15	–	0	.758
No. 19 Oregon ‍‍‍^{y}	14	–	10	–	0	.583	38	–	17	–	0	.691
California ‍‍‍^{y}	9	–	14	–	1	.396	35	–	21	–	1	.623
Oregon State ‍‍‍	6	–	17	–	1	.271	15	–	29	–	1	.344
Arizona ‍‍‍	6	–	18	–	0	.250	29	–	25	–	0	.537
Arizona State ‍‍‍	6	–	18	–	0	.250	22	–	26	–	0	.458
† – Conference champion ‡ – Tournament champion y – Invited to the NCAA Tournament; As of June 5, 2023; Rankings from NFCA/USA Today

The 2023 Pac-12 Conference softball tournament was held from May 10 through May 13, 2023 at Rita Hillenbrand Memorial Stadium in Tucson, Arizona. This marked the first postseason championship event sponsored by the Pac-12 Conference since 1978, the first to feature more than two teams. As the tournament winner, Utah earned the conference's automatic bid to the 2023 NCAA Division I softball tournament.

== Seeds ==
The tournament featured nine teams in this conference (Colorado, USC & Washington State do not field teams). Teams played once per day at the 2023 Pac-12 Softball Championship. The four-day event began with a play-in game between the eighth and ninth-place teams in the regular-season standings. That winner advanced to an eight-team, single-elimination bracket with the quarterfinals, semifinals and championship being contested on the following three days. The winner of the Pac-12 Softball Championship received the conference's automatic bid to the NCAA tournament. The seedings were determined upon completion of regular season play. The winning percentage of the teams in conference play determined tournament seedings. There were tiebreakers in place to seed teams with identical conference records.

Seed	School	Conf.	Over.	Tiebreaker
#1	UCLA	21–3	50–4	
#2	Washington	16–8	37–11	
#3	Utah	15–9	34–13	
#4	Stanford	14–10	39–12	2–1 vs. Oregon
#5	Oregon	14–10	35–14	1–2 vs. Stanford
#6	California	9–14	33–18–1	
#7	Oregon State	6–17	15–28–1	
#8	Arizona	6–18	28–24	2–1 vs. Arizona State
#9	Arizona State	6–18	22–25	1–2 vs. Arizona

== Bracket ==
Play-in Game; May 10
8	Arizona	13^{(5)}
9	Arizona State	4

Quarterfinals; May 11
1	UCLA	4
8	Arizona	3
4	Stanford	4
5	Oregon	3
2	Washington	1
7	Oregon State	0
3	Utah	6
6	California	2

Semifinals; May 12
1	UCLA	1
4	Stanford	0
2	Washington	4
3	Utah	8

Finals; May 13
1	UCLA	4
3	Utah	7

== Schedule ==
Game	Time*	Matchup^{#}	Score	Television	Attendance
Play-in Game – Wednesday, May 10
1	6:00 p.m.	No. 8 Arizona vs. No. 9 Arizona State	13−4 ^{(5)}	Pac-12 Network	2,530
Quarterfinals – Thursday, May 11
2	10:00 a.m.	No. 3 Utah vs. No. 6 California	6−2	Pac-12 Network	2,242
3	12:30 p.m.	No. 2 Washington vs. No. 7 Oregon State	1−0	Pac-12 Network	2,242
4	4:00 p.m.	No. 1 UCLA vs. No. 8 Arizona	4−3	Pac-12 Network	2,492
5	6:30 p.m.	No. 4 Stanford vs. No. 5 Oregon	4−3	Pac-12 Network	2,492
Semifinals – Friday, May 12
6	4:30 p.m.	No. 2 Washington vs. No. 3 Utah	4−8	ESPNU	2,434
7	7:30 p.m.	No. 1 UCLA vs. No. 4 Stanford	1−0	ESPN2	2,434
Championship – Saturday, May 13
8	7:00 p.m.	No. 3 Utah vs. No. 1 UCLA	7−4	ESPN2	2,548
*Game times in MST. # – Rankings denote tournament seed.

=== Team and tournament leaders ===
Hitting minimums - 75% of Games 2.5 TPA/Game Pitching minimums - 1.0 IP/Game

Team	Avg.		RBI		Home Runs		Stolen Bases		ERA		Wins		Strikeouts		Saves	
Arizona	2 Tied	0.600	2 Tied	5	Allie Skaggs	1	None	0	Devyn Netz	4.00	Devyn Netz	1	Devyn Netz	12	None	0
Arizona State	Yanni Acuna	1.000	Jazmine Hill	4	Jazmine Hill	1	None	0	Kylee Magee	8.08	None	0	Kylee Magee	4	None	0
California	Acacia Anders	0.666	Makena Smith	1	None	0	2 Tied	1	Sona Halajian	2.33	None	0	Sona Halajian	1	None	0
Oregon	Tehya Bird	.667	Alyssa Daniell	2	Alyssa Daniell	1	None	0	Morgan Scott	3.44	None	0	Morgan Scott	2	None	0
Oregon State	2 Tied	0.333	None	0	None	0	Carson Saabye	1	Tarni Stepto	0.00	None	0	2 Tied	2	None	0
Stanford	2 Tied	0.400	3 Tied	1	2 Tied	1	Taylor Gindlesperger	1	NiJaree Canady	0.00	Alana Vawter	1	NiJaree Canady	8	None	0
UCLA	Maya Brady	0.500	Maya Brady	3	Maya Brady	2	Kelli Godin	1	Brooke Yanez	2.08	2 Tied	1	Megan Faraimo	11	None	0
Utah	2 Tied	0.556	2 Tied	3	Karlie Davison	2	Abby Dayton	1	Sydney Sandez	2.00	Mariah Lopez	2	Mariah Lopez	7	None	0
Washington	Jadelyn Allchin	0.500	Jadelyn Allchin	1	5 Tied	1	None	0	Ruby Meylan	2.55	Ruby Meylan	1	Ruby Meylan	4	None	0
