= Utah Utes softball =

- 2026 Utah Utes Softball Season
- Founded: 1976 (49 years ago)
- University: University of Utah
- Head coach: Amy Hogue (19th season)
- Conference: Big 12
- Location: Salt Lake City, Utah, US
- Home stadium: Dumke Family Softball Stadium (capacity: 1,410)
- Nickname: Utes
- Colors: Red and white

NCAA WCWS appearances
- 1985, 1991, 1994, 2023

AIAW WCWS appearances
- 1976, 1982

NCAA super regional appearances
- 2016, 2017, 2023

NCAA Tournament appearances
- 1982, 1984, 1985, 1987, 1991, 1992, 1994, 1995, 1997, 2000, 2002, 2004, 2006, 2015, 2016, 2017, 2023, 2024

Conference tournament championships
- HCAC; 1984, 1985, 1987 WAC; 1991, 1992 Mountain West; 2000, 2002, 2004, 2006 Pac-12; 2023

Regular-season conference championships
- HCAC; 1985, 1987, 1988 WAC; 1991, 1992 Mountain West; 2000

The Utah Utes softball is the team that represents the University of Utah in NCAA Division I college softball. The team currently participates in the Big 12 Conference. The Utes are currently led by their head coach Amy Hogue. The team plays its home games at Dumke Family Softball Stadium located on the university's campus.

== History ==
=== Coaching history ===
Years	Coach	Record	%
1976–1989	Norma Carr	372–244–3	.603
1990–1996	Jo Evans	222–143	.608
1997–2005	Mona Stevens	281–239–1	.540
2006	Marianne Bullis & Kyle Magnusson	40–21	.656
2007	Angie Jacobs	25–26–1	.490
2008–present	Amy Hogue	440–393–1	.528

== Championships ==
=== Conference Championships ===
Season	Conference	Record	Head Coach
1985	High Country Athletic Conference	9–1	Norma Carr
1987	High Country Athletic Conference	7–3	Norma Carr
1988	High Country Athletic Conference	6–4	Norma Carr
1991	Western Athletic Conference	8–2	Jo Evans
1992	Western Athletic Conference	9–1	Jo Evans
2000	Mountain West Conference	15–5	Mona Stevens

=== Conference Tournament Championships ===
Year	Conference	Tournament Location	Head Coach
1984	High Country Athletic Conference		Norma Carr
1985	High Country Athletic Conference		Norma Carr
1987	High Country Athletic Conference		Norma Carr
1991	Western Athletic Conference	Omaha, NE	Jo Evans
1992	Western Athletic Conference	Salt Lake City, UT	Jo Evans
2000	Mountain West Conference	Salt Lake City, UT	Mona Stevens
2002	Mountain West Conference	Provo, UT	Mona Stevens
2004	Mountain West Conference	Fort Collins, CO	Mona Stevens
2006	Mountain West Conference	Las Vegas, NV	Mona Stevens
2023	Pac-12 Conference	Tucson, AZ	Amy Hogue

== Coaching staff ==
Name	Position coached	Consecutive season at Utah in current position
Amy Hogue	Head coach	15th
Courtney Martinez	Associate Head Coach	2nd
Kaija Gibson	Assistant Coach	2nd
Karl Gollan	Assistant Coach	1st
Katelyn Howard	Director of Operations	2nd

== Awards and honors ==
=== National awards ===
All-Americans

- 1981: Melonie Kent, (1st team)
- 1982: Cindy Lyon, (1st team)
- 1985: Annette Ausseresses, (1st team)
- 1985: Michele Townsend, (2nd team)
- 1987: Pipi Hollingworth, (2nd team)
- 1990: Charmelle Green,
- 1991: Charmelle Green,
- 1994: Amy (Timmel) Hogue, (2nd team)
- 1994: Ali (Andrus) Sagas, (2nd team)
- 1997: Sandy Rhea, (1st team)
- 1998: Sandy Rhea, (2nd team)
- 2000: Sunny Smith, (2nd team)
- 2006: Jackie Wong, (2nd team)
- 2014: Hannah Flippen, 2nd base (2nd team)
- 2016: Hannah Flippen, 2nd base (3rd team)
- 2017: Hannah Flippen, 2nd base (1st team)

=== Conference awards ===
WAC Player of the Year

- Charmelle Green, 1991
- Amy Hogue, 1994

WAC Freshman of the Year

- Deb DiMeglio, 1991
- Ali (Andrus) Saugus, 1994

MWC Player of the Year

- Kristin Arbogast, 2000
- Lyndsey Trevis, 2001

MWC Freshman of the Year

- Niki Hayhurst, 2000

Pac-12 Player of the Year

- Hannah Flippen, 2016, 2017

Pac-12 Defensive Player of the Year

- Hannah Flippen, 2017

Pac-12 Coach of the Year

- Amy Hogue (2015)
