= 2020 Big Ten Conference softball season =

2020 Big Ten Softball Season
- League: NCAA Division I
- Sport: Softball
- Teams: 14

Regular Season

Tournament

Softball seasons

2020 Big Ten Conference softball standings
	Conf.						Overall
Team	W		L		T	PCT	W		L		T	PCT
Iowa ‍‍‍	0	–	0	–	0	–	17	–	5	–	0	.773
No. 18 Michigan ‍‍‍	0	–	0	–	0	–	15	–	8	–	0	.652
No. 19 Minnesota ‍‍‍	0	–	0	–	0	–	15	–	9	–	1	.620
Purdue ‍‍‍	0	–	0	–	0	–	15	–	10	–	0	.600
Wisconsin ‍‍‍	0	–	0	–	0	–	14	–	10	–	0	.583
Indiana ‍‍‍	0	–	0	–	0	–	12	–	9	–	0	.571
Maryland ‍‍‍	0	–	0	–	0	–	12	–	11	–	0	.522
Illinois ‍‍‍	0	–	0	–	0	–	11	–	11	–	0	.500
Ohio State ‍‍‍	0	–	0	–	0	–	9	–	9	–	0	.500
Northwestern ‍‍‍	0	–	0	–	0	–	11	–	12	–	0	.478
Penn State ‍‍‍	0	–	0	–	0	–	11	–	15	–	0	.423
Rutgers ‍‍‍	0	–	0	–	0	–	10	–	14	–	0	.417
Nebraska ‍‍‍	0	–	0	–	0	–	9	–	14	–	0	.391
Michigan State ‍‍‍	0	–	0	–	0	–	6	–	16	–	0	.273
† – Conference champion ‡ – Tournament champion y – Invited to the NCAA tournament As of March 13, 2020; Rankings from NFCA

The 2020 Big Ten softball season began with practices in January 2020, followed by the start of the 2020 NCAA Division I softball season in February. Conference will start in March 2020 and will conclude in May, followed by the 2020 Big Ten Conference softball tournament at Eichelberger Field in Champaign, Illinois, in May.

== Coronavirus impact and cancellation ==
As of March 12, 2020, the NCAA cancelled both the remainder of the season and the tournament due to the coronavirus pandemic.

== Head coaches ==
=== Coaching changes prior to the season ===
==== Maryland ====
On August 7, 2019, Maryland head coach Julie Wright stepped down as head coach. On September 9, 2019, the school hired former Louisiana Tech head coach Mark Montgomery as the next head coach.

=== Coaches ===
Note: Stats shown are before the beginning of the season. Overall and Big Ten records are from time at current school.

Team	Head coach	Previous job	Season at school	Overall record	Big Ten record	Big Ten titles	Big Ten Tournament titles	NCAA Regionals	NCAA Super Regionals	Women's College World Series	National Championships
Illinois	Tyra Perry	Ball State	5th	145–86	48–41	0	0	3	0	0	0
Indiana	Shonda Stanton	Marshall	3rd	62–51	27–19	0	0	0	0	0	0
Iowa	Renee Luers-Gillispie	UCF	2nd	19–32	5-18	0	0	0	0	0	0
Maryland	Mark Montgomery	Louisiana Tech	1st	0-0	0-0	0	0	0	0	0	0
Michigan	Carol Hutchins	Michigan (asst.)	36th	1548–493–5	590–162	21	10	27	11	12	1
Michigan State	Jacquie Joseph	Bowling Green	26th	708–739–1	196–356	0	1	4	0	0	0
Minnesota	Jamie Trachsel	Iowa State	3rd	87–31	37–6	0	1	2	1	1	0
Nebraska	Rhonda Revelle	San Jose State (asst.)	28th	978–550	109–72	1	0	20	2	3	0
Northwestern	Kate Drohan	Northwestern (AHC)	19th	570–345–1	219–130	2	1	13	5	2	0
Ohio State	Kelly Kovach Schoenly	Miami (OH)	8th	234–141–1	94–65–1	0	0	4	0	0	0
Penn State	Amanda Lehotak	UTSA	7th	129–193	48–90	0	0	0	0	0	0
Purdue	Boo De Oliveira	Arkansas (asst.)	4th	70–105	22–46	0	0	0	0	0	0
Rutgers	Kristen Butler	Toledo	2nd	29–26	11–12	0	0	0	0	0	0
Wisconsin	Yvette Healy	Loyola-Chicago	10th	300–184–1	106–91–1	0	1	5	0	0	0

== Conference matrix ==
	Illinois	Indiana	Iowa	Maryland	Michigan	Michigan State	Minnesota	Nebraska	Northwestern	Ohio State	Penn State	Purdue	Rutgers	Wisconsin
vs. Illinois	–	0–0	0–0	0–0	0–0	0–0	0–0	0–0	0–0	0–0	0–0	0–0	0–0	0–0
vs. Indiana	0–0	–	0–0	0–0	0–0	0–0	0–0	0–0	0–0	0–0	0–0	0–0	0–0	0–0
vs. Iowa	0–0	0–0	–	0–0	0–0	0–0	0–0	0–0	0–0	0–0	0–0	0–0	0–0	0–0
vs. Maryland	0–0	0–0	0–0	–	0–0	0–0	0–0	0–0	0–0	0–0	0–0	0–0	0–0	0–0
vs. Michigan	0–0	0–0	0–0	0–0	–	0–0	0–0	0–0	0–0	0–0	0–0	0–0	0–0	0–0
vs. Michigan State	0–0	0–0	0–0	0–0	0–0	–	0–0	0–0	0–0	0–0	0–0	0–0	0–0	0–0
vs. Minnesota	0–0	0–0	0–0	0–0	0–0	0–0	–	0–0	0–0	0–0	0–0	0–0	0–0	0–0
vs. Nebraska	0–0	0–0	0–0	0–0	0–0	0–0	0–0	–	0–0	0–0	0–0	0–0	0–0	0–0
vs. Northwestern	0–0	0–0	0–0	0–0	0–0	0–0	0–0	0–0	–	0–0	0–0	0–0	0–0	0–0
vs. Ohio State	0–0	0–0	0–0	0–0	0–0	0–0	0–0	0–0	0-0	–	0–0	0–0	0–0	0–0
vs. Penn State	0–0	0–0	0–0	0–0	0–0	0–0	0–0	0–0	0–0	0–0	–	0–0	0–0	0–0
vs. Purdue	0–0	0–0	0–0	0–0	0–0	0–0	0–0	0–0	0–0	0–0	0–0	–	0–0	0–0
vs. Rutgers	0–0	0–0	0–0	0–0	0–0	0–0	0–0	0–0	0-0	0–0	0–0	0–0	–	0–0
vs. Wisconsin	0–0	0–0	0–0	0–0	0–0	0–0	0–0	0–0	0-0	0–0	0–0	0–0	0–0	–
Total	0–0	0–0	0–0	0–0	0–0	0–0	0–0	0–0	0–0	0–0	0–0	0–0	0–0	0–0
