= 2019 NCAA Division I softball season =

College softball in the United States

- Duration: February 7 – June 5, 2019
- Number of teams: 286
- Preseason No. 1: Florida State (NFCA, SA); UCLA (USA Softball/ESPN)
- Defending Champions: Florida State
- TV partner/s: ESPN

NCAA Tournament
- Duration: May 17 – June 4, 2019
- Most conference bids: SEC (13)

Women's College World Series
- Duration: May 30 – June 4, 2019
- Champions: UCLA (13th title)
- Runners-up: Oklahoma (13th WCWS Appearance)
- Winning Coach: Kelly Inouye-Perez (2nd title)
- WCWS MOP: Rachel Garcia (UCLA)

Seasons
- ← 2018 2020 →

The 2019 NCAA Division I Softball season, play of college softball in the United States organized by the National Collegiate Athletic Association (NCAA) at the Division I level, began February 7, 2019. The season will progress through the regular season, many conference tournaments and championship series, and will conclude with the 2019 NCAA Division I softball tournament and 2019 Women's College World Series. The Women's College World Series, consisting of the eight remaining teams in the NCAA Tournament will be held annually in Oklahoma City, Oklahoma at ASA Hall of Fame Stadium, will end in June 2019.

== Realignment and format changes ==
- Liberty, after 27 seasons in the Big South Conference, joined the Atlantic Sun Conference (ASUN) on July 1, 2018.
- USC Upstate, after 11 years in the ASUN, moved to the Big South.

== Ballpark Changes ==
- The 2019 season will be the last for the Virginia team at The Park. The team will move to the new University of Virginia Softball Stadium in 2020.

== Season outlook ==
USA Today / NFCA DI Top 25 Coaches Poll
Ranking	Team
1	Florida State
2	UCLA
3	Washington
4	Oklahoma
5	Florida
6	Georgia
7	Arizona
8	Tennessee
T9	Alabama
T9	South Carolina
11	LSU
12	Arizona State
13	Kentucky
14	Arkansas
15	Louisiana
16	Texas
17	Auburn
18	Baylor
19	Michigan
20	Texas A&M
21	Minnesota
22	Oklahoma State
23	James Madison
24	Mississippi State
25	Oregon

ESPN.com/USA Softball Collegiate Top 25
Ranking	Team
1	UCLA
2	Washington
3	Florida State
4	Oklahoma
5	Florida
6	Arizona
7	Georgia
8	Tennessee
9	South Carolina
10	LSU
11	Alabama
T12	Arizona State
T12	Arkansas
14	Michigan
15	Kentucky
16	Texas
17	Auburn
18	Louisiana
19	Baylor
20	Texas A&M
21	Oklahoma State
22	James Madison
23	Minnesota
24	Ohio State
25	Long Beach State

Softball America
Ranking	Team
1	Florida State
2	Washington
3	UCLA
4	Oklahoma
5	Florida
6	Georgia
7	Arizona
8	Tennessee
9	Texas
10	Michigan
11	South Carolina
12	Alabama
13	Louisiana
14	Kentucky
15	Arkansas
16	LSU
17	Wichita State
18	Minnesota
19	Arizona State
20	James Madison
21	Auburn
22	Liberty
23	Houston
24	Baylor
25	Drake

== Conference standings ==
2019 America East Conference softball standings
	Conf.				Overall
Team	W		L	PCT	W		L	PCT
UMass Lowell ‍†‍‍	15	–	3	.833	28	–	20	.583
Albany ‍‍‍	13	–	4	.765	26	–	17	.605
Stony Brook ‍‍‍	11	–	7	.611	32	–	19	.627
UMBC ‍‍‡‍^{y}	7	–	11	.389	30	–	24	.556
Binghamton ‍‍‍	6	–	12	.333	19	–	29	.396
Hartford ‍‍‍	6	–	12	.333	20	–	31	.392
Maine ‍‍‍	4	–	13	.235	12	–	29	.293
† – Conference champion ‡ – Tournament champion y – Invited to the NCAA tournament As of June 13, 2019; Rankings from NFCA

2019 American Athletic Conference softball standings
	Conf.				Overall
Team	W		L	PCT	W		L	PCT
South Florida ‍†‍‍^{y}	17	–	4	.810	41	–	19	.683
Tulsa ‍‍‍^{y}	16	–	5	.762	37	–	20	.649
Houston ‍‍‍^{y}	12	–	7	.632	39	–	19	.672
Wichita State ‍‍‍	12	–	9	.571	32	–	24	.571
UCF ‍‍‍	11	–	10	.524	34	–	21	.618
UConn ‍‍‍	8	–	13	.381	21	–	29	.420
East Carolina ‍‍‍	4	–	17	.190	23	–	31	.426
Memphis ‍‍‍	3	–	17	.150	22	–	33	.400
† – Conference champion ‡ – Tournament champion y – Invited to the NCAA tournament As of June 5, 2019; Rankings from NFCA

2019 Atlantic 10 Conference softball standings
	Conf.				Overall
Team	W		L	PCT	W		L	PCT
Fordham ‍†‍‡‍^{y}	16	–	6	.727	29	–	26	.527
UMass ‍‍‍	12	–	5	.706	26	–	22	.542
George Washington ‍‍‍	15	–	7	.682	44	–	18	.710
Dayton ‍‍‍	11	–	7	.611	24	–	27	.471
Saint Joseph's ‍‍‍	13	–	10	.565	28	–	25	.528
Saint Louis ‍‍‍	12	–	10	.545	19	–	33	.365
George Mason ‍‍‍	10	–	12	.455	22	–	26	.458
Rhode Island ‍‍‍	6	–	14	.300	17	–	29	.370
La Salle ‍‍‍	5	–	17	.227	12	–	33	.267
St. Bonaventure ‍‍‍	5	–	17	.227	9	–	36	.200
† – Conference champion ‡ – Tournament champion y – Invited to the NCAA tournament As of June 13, 2019; Rankings from NFCA

2019 Atlantic Coast Conference softball standings
	Conf.				Overall
Team	W		L	PCT	W		L	PCT
Atlantic
No. 9 Florida State ^{x}‍‍‡‍^{y}	19	–	5	.792	55	–	10	.846
Notre Dame ‍‍‍^{y}	18	–	6	.750	37	–	18	.673
Louisville ‍‍‍^{y}	12	–	12	.500	35	–	22	.614
NC State ‍‍‍	9	–	15	.375	31	–	27	.534
Syracuse ‍‍‍	8	–	16	.333	20	–	32	.385
Boston College ‍‍‍	4	–	20	.167	17	–	35	.327
Coastal
No. 23 Virginia Tech ^{x}‍†‍‍^{y}	20	–	4	.833	47	–	11	.810
North Carolina ‍‍‍^{y}	17	–	7	.708	37	–	20	.649
Duke ‍‍‍	11	–	13	.458	25	–	31	.446
Georgia Tech ‍‍‍	11	–	13	.458	31	–	27	.534
Virginia ‍‍‍	8	–	16	.333	22	–	31	.415
Pittsburgh ‍‍‍	7	–	17	.292	13	–	40	.245
x – Division champion † – Conference champion ‡ – Tournament champion y – Invited to the NCAA tournament As of June 13, 2019; Rankings from NFCA

2019 ASUN Conference softball standings
	Conf.						Overall
Team	W		L		T	PCT	W		L		T	PCT
Lipscomb ‍†‍‡‍^{y}	16	–	4	–	0	.800	42	–	15	–	1	.733
Liberty ‍‍‍	16	–	5	–	0	.762	40	–	22	–	0	.645
Florida Gulf Coast ‍‍‍	13	–	7	–	0	.650	29	–	22	–	0	.569
North Alabama ‍‍‍	10	–	10	–	0	.500	26	–	20	–	0	.565
Kennesaw State ‍‍‍	10	–	11	–	0	.476	26	–	29	–	0	.473
North Florida ‍‍‍	8	–	12	–	0	.400	30	–	24	–	0	.556
Stetson ‍‍‍	5	–	15	–	0	.250	16	–	31	–	0	.340
Jacksonville ‍‍‍	3	–	17	–	0	.150	15	–	35	–	0	.300
† – Conference champion ‡ – Tournament champion y – Invited to the NCAA tournament As of June 13, 2019; Rankings from NFCA

2019 Big 12 Conference softball standings
	Conf.				Overall
Team	W		L	PCT	W		L	PCT
No. 2 Oklahoma ‍†‍‡‍^{y}	18	–	0	1.000	57	–	6	.905
No. 6 Oklahoma State ‍‍‍^{y}	13	–	5	.722	45	–	17	.726
No. 11 Texas ‍‍‍^{y}	12	–	6	.667	46	–	17	.730
No. 19 Texas Tech ‍‍‍^{y}	8	–	10	.444	42	–	16	.724
Iowa State ‍‍‍	7	–	11	.389	37	–	25	.597
Kansas ‍‍‍	3	–	15	.167	15	–	36	.294
Baylor ‍‍‍	2	–	16	.111	18	–	31	.367
† – Conference champion ‡ – Tournament champion y – Invited to the NCAA tournament As of June 13, 2019; Rankings from NFCA

2019 Big East Conference softball standings
	Conf.				Overall
Team	W		L	PCT	W		L	PCT
St. John's ‍†‍‍	14	–	4	.778	26	–	22	.542
DePaul ‍‍‡‍^{y}	11	–	5	.688	35	–	16	.686
Providence ‍‍‍	11	–	9	.550	30	–	22	.577
Villanova ‍‍‍	9	–	8	.529	29	–	24	.547
Seton Hall ‍‍‍	10	–	9	.526	24	–	24	.500
Creighton ‍‍‍	8	–	13	.381	20	–	24	.455
Georgetown ‍‍‍	6	–	13	.316	14	–	35	.286
Butler ‍‍‍	4	–	12	.250	16	–	32	.333
† – Conference champion ‡ – Tournament champion y – Invited to the NCAA tournament As of June 5, 2019; Rankings from NFCA

2019 Big Sky Conference softball standings
	Conf.				Overall
Team	W		L	PCT	W		L	PCT
Weber State ‍†‍‡‍^{y}	14	–	2	.875	27	–	21	.563
Idaho State ‍‍‍	10	–	7	.588	20	–	28	.417
Montana ‍‍‍	10	–	8	.556	25	–	31	.446
Sacramento State ‍‍‍	9	–	8	.529	31	–	25	.554
Portland State ‍‍‍	8	–	9	.471	20	–	31	.392
Northern Colorado ‍‍‍	5	–	12	.294	14	–	39	.264
Southern Utah ‍‍‍	4	–	14	.222	6	–	34	.150
† – Conference champion ‡ – Tournament champion y – Invited to the NCAA tournament As of June 14, 2019; Rankings from NFCA

2019 Big South Conference softball standings
	Conf.						Overall
Team	W		L		T	PCT	W		L		T	PCT
Longwood ‍†‍‡‍^{y}	20	–	4	–	0	.833	37	–	22	–	0	.627
USC Upstate ‍‍‍	18	–	6	–	0	.750	41	–	15	–	0	.732
Campbell ‍‍‍	14	–	9	–	0	.609	26	–	28	–	0	.481
Winthrop ‍‍‍	14	–	10	–	0	.583	30	–	25	–	0	.545
Radford ‍‍‍	12	–	12	–	0	.500	25	–	34	–	0	.424
Charleston Southern ‍‍‍	12	–	12	–	0	.500	18	–	37	–	0	.327
Gardner–Webb ‍‍‍	9	–	15	–	0	.375	30	–	24	–	0	.556
Hampton ‍‍‍	7	–	17	–	0	.292	23	–	25	–	0	.479
Presbyterian ‍‍‍	1	–	22	–	0	.043	11	–	40	–	2	.226
† – Conference champion ‡ – Tournament champion y – Invited to the NCAA tournament As of June 14, 2019; Rankings from NFCA

2019 Big Ten Conference softball standings
	Conf.				Overall
Team	W		L	PCT	W		L	PCT
No. 20 Michigan ‍†‍‡‍^{y}	22	–	1	.957	45	–	13	.776
No. 14 Northwestern ‍‍‍^{y}	21	–	2	.913	47	–	13	.783
No. 8 Minnesota ‍‍‍^{y}	20	–	2	.909	46	–	14	.767
Ohio State ‍‍‍^{y}	17	–	6	.739	35	–	18	.660
No. 25 Wisconsin ‍‍‍^{y}	15	–	8	.652	43	–	14	.754
Rutgers ‍‍‍	11	–	12	.478	29	–	26	.527
Indiana ‍‍‍	10	–	13	.435	36	–	21	.632
Illinois ‍‍‍^{y}	9	–	14	.391	33	–	25	.569
Nebraska ‍‍‍	9	–	14	.391	21	–	31	.404
Penn State ‍‍‍	7	–	16	.304	24	–	32	.429
Purdue ‍‍‍	6	–	17	.261	34	–	29	.540
Iowa ‍‍‍	5	–	18	.217	19	–	32	.373
Michigan State ‍‍‍	4	–	18	.182	16	–	34	.320
Maryland ‍‍‍	4	–	19	.174	20	–	31	.392
† – Conference champion ‡ – Tournament champion y – Invited to the NCAA tournament As of June 14, 2019; Rankings from NFCA

2019 Big West Conference softball standings
	Conf.				Overall
Team	W		L	PCT	W		L	PCT
Cal State Fullerton ‍†‍‍^{y}	18	–	3	.857	38	–	18	.679
Hawaii ‍‍‍	14	–	7	.667	33	–	16	.673
UC Davis ‍‍‍	13	–	8	.619	39	–	14	.736
Long Beach State ‍‍‍	12	–	9	.571	25	–	25	.500
Cal State Northridge ‍‍‍	10	–	11	.476	26	–	28	.481
UC Riverside ‍‍‍	8	–	13	.381	26	–	25	.510
Cal Poly ‍‍‍	5	–	16	.238	11	–	40	.216
UC Santa Barbara ‍‍‍	4	–	17	.190	10	–	42	.192
† – Conference champion y – Invited to the NCAA tournament As of June 14, 2019; Rankings from NFCA

2019 Colonial Athletic Association softball standings
	Conf.						Overall
Team	W		L		T	PCT	W		L		T	PCT
No. 13 James Madison ‍†‍‡‍^{y}	20	–	1	–	0	.952	51	–	10	–	0	.836
Elon ‍‍‍	13	–	7	–	0	.650	33	–	20	–	1	.620
Towson ‍‍‍	10	–	11	–	0	.476	27	–	27	–	0	.500
Drexel ‍‍‍	9	–	12	–	0	.429	32	–	27	–	1	.542
Charleston ‍‍‍	9	–	12	–	0	.429	26	–	30	–	0	.464
UNC Wilmington ‍‍‍	8	–	13	–	0	.381	26	–	28	–	0	.481
Hofstra ‍‍‍	7	–	13	–	0	.350	20	–	27	–	0	.426
Delaware ‍‍‍	7	–	14	–	0	.333	22	–	29	–	0	.431
† – Conference champion ‡ – Tournament champion y – Invited to the NCAA tournament As of June 14, 2019; Rankings from NFCA

2019 Conference USA softball standings
	Conf.				Overall
Team	W		L	PCT	W		L	PCT
East
Western Kentucky ^{x}‍‍‍	18	–	6	.750	37	–	13	.740
Marshall ‍‍‍	17	–	7	.708	42	–	22	.656
Middle Tennessee ‍‍‍	11	–	13	.458	29	–	30	.492
FIU ‍‍‍	7	–	16	.304	26	–	25	.510
Florida Atlantic ‍‍‍	7	–	17	.292	20	–	30	.400
Charlotte ‍‍‍	6	–	17	.261	15	–	35	.300
West
Louisiana Tech ^{x}‍†‍‡‍^{y}	19	–	5	.792	45	–	16	.738
North Texas ^{x}‍†‍‍	19	–	5	.792	35	–	19	.648
Southern Miss ‍‍‍	13	–	11	.542	30	–	22	.577
UTEP ‍‍‍	10	–	14	.417	17	–	33	.340
UTSA ‍‍‍	8	–	16	.333	21	–	31	.404
UAB ‍‍‍	8	–	16	.333	19	–	31	.380
x – Division champion † – Conference champion ‡ – Tournament champion y – Invited to the NCAA tournament As of June 14, 2019; Rankings from NFCA

2019 Horizon League softball standings
	Conf.				Overall
Team	W		L	PCT	W		L	PCT
UIC ‍†‍‍	20	–	4	.833	32	–	23	.582
Detroit Mercy ‍‍‡‍^{y}	16	–	7	.696	31	–	28	.525
Youngstown State ‍‍‍	13	–	9	.591	25	–	29	.463
Northern Kentucky ‍‍‍	12	–	11	.522	22	–	33	.400
IUPUI ‍‍‍	11	–	11	.500	18	–	38	.321
Oakland ‍‍‍	9	–	14	.391	18	–	33	.353
Wright State ‍‍‍	9	–	15	.375	22	–	33	.400
Cleveland State ‍‍‍	8	–	16	.333	15	–	34	.306
Green Bay ‍‍‍	7	–	17	.292	12	–	29	.293
† – Conference champion ‡ – Tournament champion y – Invited to the NCAA tournament As of June 14, 2019; Rankings from NFCA

2019 Ivy League softball standings
	Conf.				Overall
Team	W		L	PCT	W		L	PCT
Harvard ‍†‍‡‍^{y}	16	–	5	.762	25	–	19	.568
Columbia ‍‍‍	15	–	6	.714	24	–	21	.533
Penn ‍‍‍	13	–	8	.619	22	–	17	.564
Yale ‍‍‍	10	–	11	.476	16	–	26	.381
Princeton ‍‍‍	10	–	11	.476	14	–	27	.341
Dartmouth ‍‍‍	10	–	11	.476	13	–	27	.325
Brown ‍‍‍	5	–	16	.238	12	–	27	.308
Cornell ‍‍‍	5	–	16	.238	10	–	36	.217
† – Conference champion ‡ – Tournament champion y – Invited to the NCAA tournament As of June 14, 2019; Rankings from NFCA

2019 Metro Atlantic Athletic Conference softball standings
	Conf.				Overall
Team	W		L	PCT	W		L	PCT
Marist ‍†‍‍	16	–	4	.800	35	–	22	.614
Monmouth ‍†‍‡‍^{y}	16	–	4	.800	36	–	18	.667
Siena ‍‍‍	13	–	7	.650	22	–	25	.468
Iona ‍‍‍	12	–	8	.600	19	–	27	.413
Niagara ‍‍‍	11	–	9	.550	18	–	32	.360
Fairfield ‍‍‍	10	–	10	.500	26	–	24	.520
Manhattan ‍‍‍	8	–	12	.400	21	–	29	.420
Quinnipiac ‍‍‍	8	–	12	.400	17	–	33	.340
Canisius ‍‍‍	8	–	12	.400	14	–	31	.311
Rider ‍‍‍	6	–	14	.300	10	–	44	.185
Saint Peter's ‍‍‍	2	–	18	.100	9	–	47	.161
† – Conference champion ‡ – Tournament champion y – Invited to the NCAA tournament As of June 14, 2019; Rankings from NFCA

2019 Mid-American Conference softball standings
	Conf.						Overall
Team	W		L		T	PCT	W		L		T	PCT
Miami (OH) ‍†‍‍	16	–	4	–	0	.800	35	–	16	–	0	.686
Kent State ‍‍‍	11	–	5	–	0	.688	28	–	26	–	0	.519
Ohio ‍‍‍	12	–	8	–	0	.600	34	–	21	–	0	.618
Northern Illinois ‍‍‍	11	–	9	–	0	.550	27	–	25	–	0	.519
Central Michigan ‍‍‍	11	–	9	–	1	.548	22	–	28	–	1	.441
Ball State ‍‍‍	9	–	8	–	0	.529	34	–	22	–	0	.607
Toledo ‍‍‡‍^{y}	10	–	9	–	0	.526	29	–	28	–	0	.509
Western Michigan ‍‍‍	9	–	11	–	0	.450	18	–	28	–	0	.391
Buffalo ‍‍‍	6	–	10	–	1	.382	10	–	32	–	1	.244
Bowling Green ‍‍‍	7	–	14	–	0	.333	22	–	29	–	0	.431
Akron ‍‍‍	3	–	18	–	0	.143	13	–	31	–	2	.304
† – Conference champion ‡ – Tournament champion y – Invited to the NCAA tournament As of June 14, 2019; Rankings from NFCA

2019 Mid-Eastern Athletic Conference softball standings
	Conf.				Overall
Team	W		L	PCT	W		L	PCT
Northern
Norfolk State ^{x}‍‍‍	11	–	4	.733	25	–	20	.556
Howard ‍‍‍	8	–	7	.533	19	–	29	.396
Delaware State ‍‍‍	7	–	8	.467	10	–	32	.238
Coppin State ‍‍‍	5	–	10	.333	9	–	32	.220
Maryland Eastern Shore ‍‍‍	3	–	11	.214	8	–	31	.205
Morgan State ‍‍‍	10	–	4	.714	22	–	24	.478
Southern
Bethune–Cookman ‍†‍‡‍^{y}	13	–	2	.867	26	–	29	.473
Florida A&M ‍‍‍	13	–	2	.867	26	–	25	.510
North Carolina Central ‍‍‍	10	–	5	.667	23	–	26	.469
North Carolina A&T ‍‍‍	5	–	10	.333	9	–	29	.237
Savannah State ‍‍‍	4	–	11	.267	9	–	28	.243
South Carolina State ‍‍‍	0	–	14	.000	0	–	34	.000
x – Division champion † – Conference champion ‡ – Tournament champion y – Invited to the NCAA tournament Morgan State Ineligible for Postseason; As of June 14, 2019; Rankings from NFCA

2019 Missouri Valley Conference softball standings
	Conf.				Overall
Team	W		L	PCT	W		L	PCT
Drake ‍†‍‡‍^{y}	24	–	2	.923	43	–	16	.729
Southern Illinois ‍‍‍^{y}	18	–	5	.783	35	–	14	.714
Northern Iowa ‍‍‍	16	–	10	.615	28	–	23	.549
Bradley ‍‍‍	15	–	10	.600	29	–	21	.580
Missouri State ‍‍‍	14	–	11	.560	30	–	21	.588
Illinois State ‍‍‍	11	–	10	.524	18	–	33	.353
Loyola Chicago ‍‍‍	9	–	16	.360	25	–	25	.500
Evansville ‍‍‍	9	–	16	.360	19	–	30	.388
Indiana State ‍‍‍	5	–	21	.192	19	–	35	.352
Valparaiso ‍‍‍	4	–	22	.154	16	–	31	.340
† – Conference champion ‡ – Tournament champion y – Invited to the NCAA tournament As of June 14, 2019; Rankings from NFCA

2019 Mountain West Conference softball standings
	Conf.				Overall
Team	W		L	PCT	W		L	PCT
Colorado State ‍†‍‍^{y}	18	–	6	.750	39	–	12	.765
San Jose State ‍‍‍	17	–	7	.708	37	–	16	.698
UNLV ‍‍‍	14	–	9	.609	36	–	14	.720
Fresno State ‍‍‍	14	–	10	.583	36	–	18	.667
Boise State ‍‍‍^{y}	12	–	12	.500	36	–	16	.692
San Diego State ‍‍‍	12	–	12	.500	25	–	26	.490
Nevada ‍‍‍	11	–	13	.458	27	–	25	.519
Utah State ‍‍‍	6	–	17	.261	17	–	30	.362
New Mexico ‍‍‍	3	–	21	.125	12	–	41	.226
† – Conference champion y – Invited to the NCAA tournament As of June 14, 2019; Rankings from NFCA

2019 Northeast Conference softball standings
	Conf.				Overall
Team	W		L	PCT	W		L	PCT
LIU Brooklyn ‍†‍‍	14	–	2	.875	36	–	18	.667
Sacred Heart ‍‍‍	11	–	5	.688	28	–	27	.509
Saint Francis (PA) ‍‍‡‍^{y}	10	–	6	.625	29	–	31	.483
Mount St. Mary's ‍‍‍	9	–	7	.563	26	–	28	.481
Bryant ‍‍‍	8	–	8	.500	13	–	32	.289
Robert Morris ‍‍‍	5	–	9	.357	14	–	37	.275
Wagner ‍‍‍	5	–	11	.313	15	–	29	.341
Fairleigh Dickinson ‍‍‍	4	–	10	.286	14	–	35	.286
Central Connecticut ‍‍‍	4	–	12	.250	17	–	24	.415
† – Conference champion ‡ – Tournament champion y – Invited to the NCAA tournament As of June 14, 2019; Rankings from NFCA

2019 Ohio Valley Conference softball standings
	Conf.				Overall
Team	W		L	PCT	W		L	PCT
Southeast Missouri State ‍†‍‍	17	–	5	.773	41	–	15	.732
Jacksonville State ‍†‍‍	17	–	5	.773	34	–	13	.723
Austin Peay ‍‍‍	16	–	6	.727	31	–	20	.608
Murray State ‍‍‍	16	–	6	.727	26	–	25	.510
Eastern Kentucky ‍‍‍	16	–	6	.727	30	–	18	.625
Belmont ‍‍‍	12	–	10	.545	30	–	21	.588
UT Martin ‍‍‍	10	–	12	.455	29	–	26	.527
SIU Edwardsville ‍‍‍	8	–	14	.364	16	–	27	.372
Tennessee Tech ‍‍‍	8	–	14	.364	18	–	27	.400
Tennessee State ‍‍‍	6	–	16	.273	13	–	29	.310
Eastern Illinois ‍‍‍	5	–	17	.227	16	–	39	.291
Morehead State ‍‍‍	1	–	21	.045	3	–	42	.067
† – Conference champion ‡ – Tournament champion y – Invited to the NCAA tournament As of May 6, 2019; Rankings from NFCA

2019 Pac-12 Conference softball standings
	Conf.				Overall
Team	W		L	PCT	W		L	PCT
No. 3 UCLA ‍†‍‍^{y}	20	–	4	.833	56	–	6	.903
No. 2 Washington ‍†‍‍^{y}	20	–	4	.833	52	–	8	.867
No. 6 Arizona ‍‍‍^{y}	19	–	5	.792	48	–	14	.774
Arizona State ‍‍‍^{y}	13	–	11	.542	35	–	20	.636
Stanford ‍‍‍^{y}	8	–	13	.381	33	–	19	.635
Oregon State ‍‍‍	8	–	14	.364	26	–	19	.578
Utah ‍‍‍	7	–	17	.292	19	–	35	.352
California ‍‍‍	5	–	18	.217	28	–	27	.509
Oregon ‍‍‍	5	–	19	.208	22	–	30	.423
† – Conference champion y – Invited to the NCAA tournament As of June 5, 2019; Rankings from NFCA

2019 Patriot League softball standings
	Conf.						Overall
Team	W		L		T	PCT	W		L		T	PCT
Boston University ‍†‍‍	15	–	2	–	0	.882	34	–	18	–	0	.654
Bucknell ‍‍‍	14	–	3	–	0	.824	27	–	22	–	0	.551
Lehigh ‍‍‍	11	–	7	–	0	.611	25	–	26	–	0	.490
Colgate ‍‍‍	8	–	10	–	0	.444	25	–	25	–	0	.500
Army ‍‍‍	8	–	10	–	0	.444	26	–	30	–	0	.464
Holy Cross ‍‍‍	5	–	13	–	0	.278	14	–	35	–	0	.286
Lafayette ‍‍‍	1	–	17	–	0	.056	8	–	40	–	1	.173
† – Conference champion ‡ – Tournament champion y – Invited to the NCAA tournament As of May 6, 2019; Rankings from NFCA

2019 Southeastern Conference softball standings
	Conf.				Overall
Team	W		L	PCT	W		L	PCT
No. 5 Alabama ‍†‍‍^{y}	18	–	6	.750	60	–	10	.857
No. 11 Tennessee ‍‍‍^{y}	14	–	10	.583	43	–	17	.717
No. 10 LSU ‍‍‍^{y}	14	–	10	.583	43	–	19	.694
No. 23 Kentucky ‍‍‍^{y}	14	–	10	.583	36	–	24	.600
No. 17 Ole Miss ‍‍‍^{y}	13	–	10	.565	41	–	20	.672
No. 8 Florida ‍‍‡‍^{y}	12	–	12	.500	49	–	18	.731
No. 14 Georgia ‍‍‍^{y}	12	–	12	.500	42	–	19	.689
No. 20 Arkansas ‍‍‍^{y}	12	–	12	.500	38	–	20	.655
Missouri ‍‍‍^{y}	12	–	12	.500	35	–	25	.583
No. 24 Auburn ‍‍‍^{y}	10	–	14	.417	39	–	21	.650
No. 21 South Carolina ‍‍‍^{y}	9	–	14	.391	38	–	19	.667
Mississippi State ‍‍‍^{y}	9	–	15	.375	35	–	23	.603
Texas A&M ‍‍‍^{y}	6	–	18	.250	28	–	27	.509
† – Conference champion ‡ – Tournament champion y – Invited to the NCAA tournament As of June 5, 2019; Rankings from NFCA

2019 Southern Conference softball standings
	Conf.						Overall
Team	W		L		T	PCT	W		L		T	PCT
UNC Greensboro ‍†‍‍	12	–	5	–	0	.706	33	–	23	–	0	.589
Chattanooga ‍‍‡‍^{y}	11	–	7	–	0	.611	37	–	17	–	0	.685
Samford ‍‍‍	11	–	7	–	0	.611	23	–	31	–	0	.426
Mercer ‍‍‍	10	–	7	–	0	.588	27	–	29	–	0	.482
East Tennessee State ‍‍‍	7	–	11	–	0	.389	22	–	27	–	2	.451
Western Carolina ‍‍‍	5	–	12	–	0	.294	21	–	32	–	0	.396
Furman ‍‍‍	5	–	12	–	0	.294	13	–	38	–	0	.255
† – Conference champion ‡ – Tournament champion y – Invited to the NCAA tournament As of June 14, 2019; Rankings from NFCA

2019 Southland Conference softball standings
	Conf.				Overall
Team	W		L	PCT	W		L	PCT
Sam Houston State ‍†‍‡‍^{y}	22	–	5	.815	35	–	23	.603
Nicholls ‍‍‍	21	–	6	.778	34	–	22	.607
McNeese State ‍‍‍	19	–	8	.704	33	–	32	.508
Stephen F. Austin ‍‍‍	18	–	9	.667	36	–	23	.610
Southeastern Louisiana ‍‍‍	17	–	10	.630	34	–	23	.596
Northwestern State ‍‍‍	15	–	12	.556	30	–	27	.526
Lamar ‍‍‍	14	–	13	.519	23	–	34	.404
Central Arkansas ‍‍‍	12	–	15	.444	26	–	28	.481
Houston Baptist ‍‍‍	10	–	17	.370	23	–	23	.500
Abilene Christian ‍‍‍	6	–	21	.222	13	–	31	.295
Incarnate Word ‍‍‍	4	–	22	.154	8	–	40	.167
Texas A&M–Corpus Christi ‍‍‍	3	–	23	.115	8	–	43	.157
† – Conference champion ‡ – Tournament champion y – Invited to the NCAA tournament As of May 19, 2019; Rankings from NFCA

2019 Southwestern Athletic Conference softball standings
	Conf.				Overall
Team	W		L	PCT	W		L	PCT
East
Alabama A&M ^{x}‍‍‍	11	–	7	.611	22	–	17	.564
Alabama State ‍‍‍	10	–	7	.588	20	–	22	.476
Alcorn State ‍‍‍	9	–	9	.500	13	–	22	.371
Jackson State ‍‍‍	7	–	11	.389	12	–	34	.261
Mississippi Valley State ‍‍‍	5	–	12	.294	11	–	31	.262
West
Texas Southern ^{x}‍†‍‍	16	–	1	.941	20	–	24	.455
Prairie View A&M ‍‍‍	15	–	3	.833	27	–	15	.643
Southern ‍‍‍	6	–	11	.353	8	–	25	.242
Grambling State ‍‍‍	4	–	13	.235	16	–	24	.400
Arkansas–Pine Bluff ‍‍‍	3	–	12	.200	4	–	32	.111
x – Division champion † – Conference champion ‡ – Tournament champion y – Invited to the NCAA tournament As of May 6, 2019; Rankings from NFCA

2019 Summit League softball standings
	Conf.				Overall
Team	W		L	PCT	W		L	PCT
North Dakota State ‍†‍‡‍^{y}	16	–	2	.889	42	–	16	.724
South Dakota ‍‍‍	12	–	6	.667	33	–	28	.541
Western Illinois ‍‍‍	12	–	6	.667	20	–	20	.500
South Dakota State ‍‍‍	11	–	7	.611	37	–	19	.661
North Dakota ‍‍‍	7	–	11	.389	22	–	34	.393
Purdue Fort Wayne ‍‍‍	3	–	15	.167	10	–	39	.204
Omaha ‍‍‍	2	–	16	.111	4	–	43	.085
† – Conference champion ‡ – Tournament champion y – Invited to the NCAA tournament As of June 14, 2019; Rankings from NFCA

2019 Sun Belt Conference softball standings
	Conf.				Overall
Team	W		L	PCT	W		L	PCT
No. 17 Louisiana ‍†‍‡‍^{y}	25	–	0	1.000	52	–	6	.897
Troy ‍‍‍	19	–	8	.704	37	–	20	.649
UT Arlington ‍‍‍	17	–	10	.630	36	–	27	.571
Texas State ‍‍‍	16	–	10	.615	29	–	25	.537
Appalachian State ‍‍‍	13	–	13	.500	31	–	25	.554
Coastal Carolina ‍‍‍	13	–	14	.481	39	–	21	.650
Georgia Southern ‍‍‍	9	–	17	.346	23	–	28	.451
Louisiana–Monroe ‍‍‍	7	–	17	.292	14	–	42	.250
South Alabama ‍‍‍	7	–	20	.259	18	–	31	.367
Georgia State ‍‍‍	5	–	22	.185	8	–	46	.148
† – Conference champion ‡ – Tournament champion y – Invited to the NCAA tournament As of June 14, 2019; Rankings from NFCA

2019 West Coast Conference softball standings
	Conf.				Overall
Team	W		L	PCT	W		L	PCT
BYU ‍†‍‍^{y}	12	–	3	.800	30	–	26	.536
Loyola Marymount ‍‍‍	11	–	4	.733	40	–	21	.656
Santa Clara ‍‍‍	8	–	7	.533	16	–	34	.320
Saint Mary's ‍‍‍	7	–	8	.467	14	–	37	.275
San Diego ‍‍‍	4	–	11	.267	20	–	29	.408
Pacific ‍‍‍	3	–	12	.200	17	–	32	.347
† – Conference champion y – Invited to the NCAA tournament As of June 14, 2019; Rankings from NFCA

2019 Western Athletic Conference softball standings
	Conf.				Overall
Team	W		L	PCT	W		L	PCT
Seattle ‍†‍‡‍^{y}	15	–	3	.833	40	–	17	.702
New Mexico State ‍‍‍	12	–	6	.667	33	–	22	.600
Grand Canyon ‍‍‍	12	–	6	.667	33	–	24	.579
California Baptist ‍‍‍	8	–	10	.444	21	–	33	.389
Utah Valley ‍‍‍	7	–	11	.389	15	–	31	.326
UMKC ‍‍‍	6	–	12	.333	27	–	29	.482
Cal State Bakersfield ‍‍‍	3	–	15	.167	15	–	32	.319
† – Conference champion ‡ – Tournament champion y – Invited to the NCAA tournament As of June 14, 2019; Rankings from NFCA

=== Conference winners and tournaments ===
Of the 31 Division I athletic conferences that sponsor baseball, 27 end their regular seasons with a single-elimination tournament or a double elimination tournament. The teams in each conference that win their regular season title are given the number one seed in each tournament. Four conferences, the Big West, Mountain West, Pac-12, and West Coast Conference do not hold a conference tournament. The winners of these tournaments, plus the Big West, Mountain West, Pac-12, and West Coast Conference regular-season champions, receive automatic invitations to the 2019 NCAA Division I softball tournament.

Conference	Regular Season Winner	Conference Player of the Year	Conference Pitcher of the Year	Conference Coach of the Year	Conference Tournament	Tournament Venue • City	Tournament Winner
America East Conference	UMass Lowell	Melissa Rahrich, Stony Brook	Courtney Coppersmith, Pitcher/Utility, UMBC	Danielle Henderson, UMass Lowell	2019 America East Conference softball tournament	Hartford Softball Field • West Hartford, CT	UMBC
American Athletic Conference	South Florida	Sarah Barker, Houston & Julia Hollingsworth, Tulsa	Georgina Corrick, USF	USF	2019 American Athletic Conference softball tournament	Cougar Softball Stadium • Houston, TX	South Florida
Atlantic 10 Conference	Fordham	Jenna Cone, George Washington	Madie Aughinbaugh, Fordham	Melissa Inouye, Fordham	2019 Atlantic 10 Conference softball tournament	UMass Softball Complex • Amherst, MA	Fordham
Atlantic Coast Conference	Virginia Tech	Cait Brooks, Notre Dame	Carrie Eberle, Virginia Tech	Pete D'Amour, Virginia Tech	2019 Atlantic Coast Conference softball tournament	JoAnne Graf Field • Tallahassee, FL	Florida State
Atlantic Sun Conference	Lipscomb	Hannah DeVault, Lipscomb	Megan Garst, North Alabama	Kristin Ryman, Lipscomb	2019 Atlantic Sun Conference softball tournament	FGCU Softball Complex • Fort Myers, FL	Lipscomb
Big 12 Conference	Oklahoma	Sydney Romero, Oklahoma	Giselle Juarez, Oklahoma	Patty Gasso, Oklahoma	2019 Big 12 Conference softball tournament	ASA Hall of Fame Stadium • Oklahoma City, OK	Oklahoma
Big East Conference	St. John's	Paige Rauch, Villanova	Madison Morris, St. John's	St. John's	2019 Big East Conference softball tournament	Ballpark at Rosemont • Rosemont, IL	DePaul
Big Sky Conference	Weber State	Takesha Saltern, Weber State	Savanna Corr, Sacramento State	Mary Kay Amicone, Weber State	2019 Big Sky Conference softball tournament	Shea Stadium • Sacramento, CA	Weber State
Big South Conference	Longwood	Alyssa Oakes, USC Upstate	Christina Biggerstaff, USC Upstate	Kathy Riley, Longwood	2019 Big South Conference softball tournament	Amanda Littlejohn Stadium • Buies Creek, NC	Longwood
Big Ten Conference	Michigan	Kayla Konwent, Wisconsin	Amber Fisher, Minnesota	Kate Drohan, Northwestern	2019 Big Ten Conference softball tournament	Andy Mohr Field • Bloomington, IN	Michigan
Big West Conference	Cal State Fullerton	Ari Williams, Cal State Fullerton	Brooke Yanez, UC Davis	Kelly Ford, Cal State Fullerton	No Tournament, regular season champion earns auto bid		Cal State Fullerton
Colonial Athletic Association	James Madison	Odicci Alexander, James Madison	Megan Good, James Madison	Loren LaPorte, James Madison	2019 Colonial Athletic Association softball tournament	Eagle Field at Veterans Memorial Park • Harrisonburg, VA	James Madison
Conference USA	Louisiana Tech & North Texas	Jazlyn Crowder, Louisiana Tech	Abby Trahan, Southern Miss	Mark Montgomery, Louisiana Tech & Rodney DeLong, North Texas	2019 Conference USA softball tournament	Mary Bowers Field • Birmingham, AL	Louisiana Tech
Horizon League	UIC	Kayla Wedl, UIC	Ashley Mauser, Detroit Mercy	John Conway, Detroit Mercy	2019 Horizon League softball tournament	Flames Field • Chicago, IL	Detroit Mercy
Ivy League	Harvard	Micah Schroder, Dartmouth	Katie Duncan, Harvard	Jennifer Teague, Columbia	2019 Ivy League Softball Championship Series	Campus sites	Harvard
Metro Atlantic Athletic Conference	Marist & Monmouth	Madysen Cossack, Siena	Alyssa Irons, Monmouth	Joe Ausanio, Marist	2019 Metro Atlantic Athletic Conference softball tournament	Softball Park at Gartland Field • Poughkeepsie, NY	Monmouth
Mid-American Conference	Miami (OH)	Brenna Brownfield, Kent State	Andrea Scali, Kent State	Clarisa Crowell, Miami	2019 Mid-American Conference softball tournament	Firestone Stadium • Akron, OH	Toledo
Mid-Eastern Athletic Conference	Bethune–Cookman	Damali Young, Morgan State	Alexis Bermudez, Bethune-Cookman	James Inzana, Norfolk State	2019 Mid-Eastern Athletic Conference softball tournament	Sunnyland Park • Ormond Beach, FL	Bethune–Cookman
Missouri Valley Conference	Drake	Sammey Bunch, Northern Iowa	Nicole Newman, Drake	Rich Calvert, Drake	2019 Missouri Valley Conference softball tournament	Petersen Hotels Field at the Louisville Slugger Sports Complex • Peoria, IL	Drake
Mountain West Conference	Colorado State	Amber Nelson, Colorado State	Jenessa Ullegue, San Jose State	Jen Fisher, Colorado State	No Tournament, regular season champion earns auto bid		Colorado State
Northeast Conference	LIU Brooklyn	Hailey Desrosiers, Sacred Heart	Elena Valenzuela, LIU Brooklyn	Roy Kortmann, LIU Brooklyn	2019 Northeast Conference softball tournament	LIU Field • Brooklyn, NY	Saint Francis (PA)
Ohio Valley Conference	Southeast Missouri State & Jacksonville State	Rachel Anderson, Southeast Missouri	Faith Sims, Jacksonville State	Mark Redburn, Southeast Missouri	2019 Ohio Valley Conference softball tournament	Choccolocco Park • Oxford, AL	Southeast Missouri State
Pac–12 Conference	UCLA & Washington	Rachel Garcia, UCLA	Rachel Garcia, UCLA	Jessica Allister, Stanford	No Tournament, regular season champion earns auto bid		UCLA
Patriot League	Boston University	Alex Heinen, Boston University	Ali DuBois, Boston University	Joey Lye, Bucknell	2019 Patriot League softball tournament	BU Softball Field • Boston, MA	Boston University
Southeastern Conference	Alabama	Abbey Cheek, Kentucky	Sarah Cornell, Alabama	Patrick Murphy, Alabama	2019 Southeastern Conference softball tournament	Davis Diamond • College Station, TX	Florida
Southern Conference	UNC Greensboro	Marissa Guimbarda, Furman	Celie Hudson, Chattanooga	Janelle Breneman, UNC Greensboro	2019 Southern Conference softball tournament	Frost Stadium • Chattanooga, TN	Chattanooga
Southland Conference	Sam Houston State	Lindsey McLeod, Sam Houston State	Lindsey McLeod, Sam Houston State	Garrett Valis, Sam Houston State	2019 Southland Conference softball tournament	Lady Demon Diamond • Natchitoches, LA	Sam Houston State
Southwestern Athletic Conference	Texas Southern	Tamia Lee-Barbadillo, Alabama A&M	Crystal Castillo, Prairie View A&M	Cassandra Brown, Alabama A&M	2019 Southwestern Athletic Conference softball tournament	Barbara Williams Softball Complex • Montgomery, AL	Alabama State
Summit League	North Dakota State	Katie Shoultz, North Dakota State	KK Leddy, North Dakota State	Darren Mueller, North Dakota State	2019 Summit League softball tournament	Tharaldson Park at the Ellig Sports Complex • Fargo, ND	North Dakota State
Sun Belt Conference	Louisiana	Alissa Dalton, Louisiana	Summer Ellyson, Louisiana	Gerry Glasco, Louisiana	2019 Sun Belt Conference softball tournament	Bobcat Softball Stadium • San Marcos, TX	Louisiana
West Coast Conference	BYU	Lexi Tarrow, BYU	Arissa Paulson, BYU	Sami Strinz-Ward, Loyola Marymount	No Tournament, regular season champion earns auto bid		BYU
Western Athletic Conference	Seattle	Nikki Butler, New Mexico State	Samaria Diaz, New Mexico State	Kathy Rodolph, New Mexico State	2019 Western Athletic Conference softball tournament	Stapleton-Pierson Stadium • Phoenix, AZ	Seattle

== National Invitational Softball Championship ==
UTA Mavericks defeated the Iowa State Cyclones in the championship; Aileen Garcia was named MVP for the series.

== Women's College World Series ==
=== Participants ===
School	Conference	Record (conference)	Head coach	WCWS appearances† (including 2019 WCWS)	WCWS best finish†*	WCWS W–L record† (excluding 2019 WCWS)
Alabama	SEC	57–8 (18–6)	Patrick Murphy	12 (last: 2016)	1st (2012)	17–21
Arizona	Pac-12	47–12 (19–5)	Mike Candrea	23 (last: 2010)	1st (1991, 1993, 1994, 1996; 1997, 2001, 2006, 2007)	61–32
Florida	SEC	49–16 (12–12)	Tim Walton	10 (last: 2018)	1st (2014, 2015)	26-16
Minnesota	Big Ten	46–12 (20–2)	Jamie Trachsel	1	—	—
Oklahoma	Big 12	54–3 (18–0)	Patty Gasso	13 (last: 2018)	1st (2000, 2013, 2016, 2017)	30–17
Oklahoma State	Big 12	44–15 (13–5)	Kenny Gajewski	8 (last: 2011)	3rd (1989, 1990, 1993, 1994)	11–14
UCLA	Pac-12	51–6 (20–4)	Kelly Inouye-Perez	29 (last: 2018)	1st (1982, 1984, 1985, 1988, 1989; 1990, 1992, 1999, 2003, 2004)	94–29
Washington	Pac-12	50–7 (20–4)	Heather Tarr	14 (last: 2018)	1st (2009)	24–21

† = From NCAA Division I Softball Championship Results

=== Bracket ===
The 2019 Women's College World Series will begin on May 30 in Oklahoma City, Oklahoma.

First round
1	Oklahoma	3
8	Alabama	2
5	Florida	1
13	Oklahoma State	2
8	Alabama	15
5	Florida	3^{(5)}
3	Washington	1^{(8)}
6	Arizona	3
7	Minnesota	2
2	UCLA	7
3	Washington	5
7	Minnesota	3

Second round
1	Oklahoma	6
13	Oklahoma State	1
8	Alabama	2
6	Arizona	0
6	Arizona	2
2	UCLA	6
13	Oklahoma State	0
3	Washington	1

Semifinals
1	Oklahoma	0^{(8)}	7
8	Alabama	1	3
2	UCLA	3	X
3	Washington	0^{(10)}	X

Finals
1	Oklahoma	3	4	X
2	UCLA	16	5	X

== Season leaders ==
Batting

- Batting average: .507 – Courtney Cashman, UMass Lowell River Hawks
- RBIs: 84 – Bailey Hemphill, Alabama Crimson Tide
- Home runs: 29 – Jessie Harper, Arizona Wildcats

Pitching

- Wins: 39-6 – Summer Ellyson, Louisiana Ragin' Cajuns
- ERA: 1.03 (30 ER/203.2 IP) – Brooke Yanez, UC Davis Aggies
- Strikeouts: 423 – Nicole Newman, Drake Bulldogs

== Records ==
NCAA Division I season perfect games: 5 – Nicole Newman, Drake Bulldogs

Freshman class single game strikeouts: 27 – Kelly Nelson, Holy Cross Crusaders; March 6, 2019 (16 innings)

Team consecutive wins streak: 41 – Oklahoma Sooners; February 24-May 19, 2019

== Awards ==
- USA Softball Collegiate Player of the Year: Rachel Garcia, UCLA
- Collegiate Woman Athlete of the Year Honda Sports Award Softball: Rachel Garcia, UCLA
- Honda Sports Award Softball: Rachel Garcia, UCLA
- NFCA National Pitcher of the Year: Rachel Garcia, ULA
- espnW Softball Player of the Year: Rachel Garcia, UCLA
- Softball America Player of the Year: Rachel Garcia, UCLA

YEAR	G	AB	R	H	BA	RBI	HR	3B	2B	TB	SLG	BB	SO	SB	SBA
2019	61	172	34	59	.343	57	11	1	9	103	.588%	35	20	0	0

YEAR	W	L	GP	GS	CG	SHO	SV	IP	H	R	ER	BB	SO	ERA	WHIP
2019	29	1	36	25	19	7	4	202.0	117	40	33	43	286	1.14	0.79

- NFCA National Player of the Year: Abbey Cheek, Kentucky

YEAR	G	AB	R	H	BA	RBI	HR	3B	2B	TB	SLG	BB	SO	SB	SBA
2019	60	152	54	65	.427	53	20	0	13	138	.908%	64	14	8	9

- Softball America Pitcher of the Year: Giselle Juarez, Oklahoma

YEAR	W	L	GP	GS	CG	SHO	SV	IP	H	R	ER	BB	SO	ERA	WHIP
2019	28	4	39	32	15	7	0	186.1	97	41	37	38	269	1.39	0.72

- NFCA National Freshman of the Year: Danielle Williams, Northwestern
- Softball America Freshman of the Year: Danielle Williams, Northwestern

YEAR	W	L	GP	GS	CG	SHO	SV	IP	H	R	ER	BB	SO	ERA	WHIP
2019	31	8	44	36	26	13	2	230.0	129	57	51	46	317	1.55	0.76

- Softball America Defensive Player of the Year: Sis Bates, Washington
- Softball America Freshman Pitcher of the Year: Shealyn O'Leary, Texas
- NFCA Catcher of the Year: Dejah Mulipola, Arizona
- NFCA Golden Shoe Award: Jaquelyn Ramon, Southeastern Louisiana
- Senior CLASS Award: Katie Reed, Kentucky

=== Coaches ===
- NFCA National Coaching Staff of the Year: UCLA
- NFCA West Regional Coaching Staff of the Year: UCLA
- NFCA Central Regional Coaching Staff of the Year: Oklahoma
- NFCA Great Lakes Regional Coaching Staff of the Year: Minnesota
- NFCA Mid-Atlantic Regional Coaching Staff of the Year: Virginia Tech
- NFCA Mideast Regional Coaching Staff of the Year: Louisiana Tech & Southeast Missouri State
- NFCA Midwest Regional Coaching Staff of the Year: Oklahoma State
- NFCA Northeast Regional Coaching Staff of the Year: James Madison
- NFCA Pacific Regional Coaching Staff of the Year: Washington
- NFCA South Regional Coaching Staff of the Year: Alabama
- NFCA Southeast Regional Coaching Staff of the Year: Florida

==== Assistants ====
- NFCA Assistant Coach of the Year: Sara Michalowski-Marino, Missouri

=== Other Awards ===
- Turface Athletics/NFCA Field of the Year: Jane Sanders Stadium, Oregon
- Donna Newberry "Perseverance" Award: Bari Mance
- Humanitarian Award: Joelle Della Volpe, St. Mary's High School (NJ)
- Distinguished Service Award:

== All America Teams ==
The following players were members of the All-American Teams.

First Team

Position	Player	Class	School
P	Gabbie Plain	SO.	Washington Huskies
P	Amber Fiser	JR.	Minnesota Golden Gophers
P	Giselle Juarez	JR.	Oklahoma Sooners
C	Dejah Mulipola	JR.	Arizona Wildcats
1B	Kayla Konwent	JR.	Wisconsin Badgers
2B	Caleigh Clifton	SR.	Oklahoma Sooners
3B	Abbey Cheek	SR.	Kentucky Wildcats
SS	Sis Bates	JR.	Washington Huskies
OF	Alyssa Palomino-Cardoza	JR.	Arizona Wildcats
OF	Morgan Howe	SR.	Arizona State Sun Devils
OF	Amanda Lorenz	SR.	Florida Gators
UT	Rachel Garcia	JR.	UCLA Bruins
UT	Cait Brooks	SR.	Notre Dame Fighting Irish
AT-L	Nicole Newman	SR.	Drake Bulldogs
AT-L	Sydney Sherrill	SO.	FSU Seminoles
AT-L	Kylan Becker	SR.	Mississippi Rebels
AT-L	Taylor McQuillin	SR.	Arizona Wildcats
AT-L	Sydney Romero	SR.	Oklahoma Sooners

Second Team

Position	Player	Class	School
P	Kelly Barnhill	SR.	Florida Gators
P	Georgina Corrick	SO.	USF Bulls
P	Montana Fouts	FR.	Alabama Crimson Tide
C	Morganne Flores	JR.	Washington Huskies
1B	Kaylee Tow	SO.	Alabama Crimson Tide
2B	Reyna Carranco	JR.	Arizona Wildcats
3B	Amanda Sánchez	SR.	LSU Tigers
SS	Lili Piper	SR.	Ohio State Buckeyes
OF	Bubba Nickles	JR.	UCLA Bruins
OF	Jocelyn Alo	SO.	Oklahoma Sooners
OF	Falepolima Aviu	SR.	Oklahoma Sooners
UT	Shelbi Sunseri	SO.	LSU Tigers
UT	Ulufa Leilua	JR.	Mississippi State Bulldogs
AT-L	Jessie Harper	JR.	Arizona Wildcats
AT-L	Bailey Hemphill	JR.	Alabama Crimson Tide
AT-L	Autumn Storms	JR.	Arkansas Razorbacks
AT-L	Janae Jefferson	SO.	Texas Longhorns
AT-L	Meghan King	SR.	FSU Seminoles

Third Team

Position	Player	Class	School
P	Taran Alvelo	SR.	Washington Huskies
P	Summer Ellyson	JR.	ULL Ragin' Cajuns
P	Danielle Williams	FR.	Northwestern Wildcats
C	Mia Davidson	SO.	Mississippi State Bulldogs
1B	Grace Green	FR.	Oklahoma Sooners
2B	Aubrey Leach	SR.	Tennessee Lady Vols
3B	Skylee James	SR.	UIC Flames
SS	Alyssa DiCarlo	SR.	Georgia Bulldogs
OF	Kindra Hackbarth	JR.	Arizona State Sun Devils
OF	Kate Gordon	JR.	James Madison Dukes
OF	Karli Hamilton	JR.	Texas Tech Red Raiders
UT	Odicci Alexander	JR.	James Madison Dukes
UT	Kendyl Lindaman	JR.	Florida Gators
AT-L	Megan Good	SR.	James Madison Dukes
AT-L	Samantha Show	SR.	Oklahoma State Cowgirls
AT-L	Miranda Elish	JR.	Texas Longhorns
AT-L	Emily Clark	SR.	Ohio State Buckeyes
AT-L	Rachel Anderson	JR.	Southeast Missouri State Redhawks

== Final rankings ==
USA Today / NFCA DI Top 25 Coaches Poll
Ranking	Team
1	UCLA
2	Oklahoma
3	Washington
4	Alabama
5	Arizona
6	Oklahoma State
7	Florida
8	Minnesota
9	Florida State
10	LSU
11	Texas
12	Tennessee
13	James Madison
14	Northwestern
15	Ole Miss
16	Kentucky
17	Georgia
18	Louisiana
19	Texas Tech
20	Michigan
21	South Carolina
22	Auburn
23	Virginia Tech
24	Arizona State
25	Wisconsin

ESPN.com/USA Softball Collegiate Top 25
Ranking	Team
1	UCLA
2	Oklahoma
3	Washington
4	Alabama
5	Arizona
6	Oklahoma State
7	Florida
8	Minnesota
9	Florida State
10	Texas
11	Tennessee
12	LSU
13	James Madison
14	Ole Miss
15	Kentucky
16	Northwestern
17	Louisiana
18	Michigan
19	Texas Tech
20	Georgia
21	Virginia Tech
22	Wisconsin
T-23	Auburn
T-23	South Carolina
25	Drake

Softball America
Ranking	Team
1	UCLA
2	Oklahoma
3	Washington
4	Alabama
5	Arizona
6	Oklahoma State
7	Florida
8	Minnesota
9	Texas
10	LSU
11	Ole Miss
12	Tennessee
13	Florida State
14	Kentucky
15	James Madison
16	Northwestern
17	Louisiana
18	Michigan
19	Wisconsin
20	Texas Tech
21	Georgia
22	Virginia Tech
23	Auburn
24	South Carolina
25	Arizona State

== Coaching changes ==
This table lists programs that changed head coaches at any point from the first day of the 2019 season until the day before the first day of the 2020 season.

Team	Former coach	Interim coach	New coach	Reason
Abilene Christian	Bobby Reeves		Abigail Farler	On May 11, Reeves stepped down as head coach of the Abilene Christian after 9 seasons with the program. Abigail Farler was named as new softball coach on June 13.
Akron	Julie Jones		Meaggan Pettipiece	On May 16, Akron announced that head coach Julie Jones would not receive a contract extension and that the program will begin looking for a new head coach.
Alabama State	Chris Steiner-Wilcoxson		Todd Bradley	On August 6, Chris Steiner-Wilcoxson accepted the head coaching position at FIU, leaving Alabama State after five seasons. On October 10, Todd Bradley was named the new head coach for the 2020 season.
Army	Bob Beretta		Cheryl Milligan	On June 19, Army West Point announced the hiring of assistant coach Cheryl Milligan as head coach of the softball program.
Belmont	Brian Levin		Megan Rhodes Smith	On June 25, Brian Levin accepted the head coaching position at Southern Miss, leaving Belmont after nine seasons with a record of 91–70. On July 12, Megan Rhodes Smith was named the new head coach for the 2020 season.
Boston College	Ashley Obrest	Megan Brown	Amy Kvilhaug	On May 21, Ashley Obrest announced her resignation as head coach of the Boston College softball program effective immediately. On July 2, Amy Kvilhaug was named the new head coach for the 2020 season.
Central Michigan	Margo Jonker		McCall Salmon	Jonker announced her retirement after 40 seasons at Central Michigan on May 13. On June 20, Central Michigan announced the hiring of McCall Salmon as new head coach of the softball program.
Charlotte	Aimee DeVos		Ashley Chastain	On May 13, Charlotte announced that head coach Aimee DeVos will not be retained after 25 years with the program. On June 6, Charlotte announced the hiring of Ashley Chastain as head coach of the Charlotte softball program. Chastain served as pitching coach for the last two seasons at Ole Miss.
Connecticut	Jen McIntyre		Laura Valentino	On May 22, UConn announced that head coach Jen McIntyre will not be returning as head coach of the Huskies softball program after 5 seasons. On July 3, Laura Valentino was named the new head coach for the 2020 season.
Detroit Mercy	John Conway		Marc Gillis	John Conway announced his retirement after 5 seasons with the team. On July 2, Marc Gillis, a Titans assistant for 2 seasons, was promoted to head coach.
Delaware State	Amber Jackson		Jeff Franquet	On April 15, Amber Jackson announced she would be stepping down as head coach of Delaware State at the end of the season. On June 13, Jeff Franquet was named the new head coach for the 2020 season.
Eastern Illinois	Kim Schuette		Tara Archibald	On June 28, Kim Schuette accepted the pitching coach position at Ole Miss, leaving Eastern Illinois after three seasons with a record of 80–80. On August 5, Tara Archibald was named the new head coach for the 2020 season.
FIU	Gator Rebhan	Heather Gelbard	Chris Steiner-Wilcoxson	On October 17, 2018, FIU parted ways with Gator Rebhan. Heather Gelbard was named interim head coach. On August 6, Chris Steiner-Wilcoxson was named the new head coach for the 2020 season.
Green Bay	Scott Wachholz		Sara Kubuske	On June 9, Green Bay announced that it was parting ways with head coach Scott Wachholz. On July 8, Sara Kubuske was named the new head coach for the 2020 season.
Idaho State	Candi Letts		Cristal Brown	On June 18, Idaho State announced that Candi Letts would not return for the 2020 season. On July 29, Cristal Brown was named the new head coach for the 2020 season.
Louisiana Tech	Mark Montgomery	Bianca Duran	Maria Winn-Ratliff	On September 9, Mark Montgomery accepted the head coaching position at Maryland, leaving Louisiana Tech after seven seasons with a record of 226–163. On September 23, Maria Winn-Ratliff was named the new head coach for the 2020 season.
Loyola-Chicago			Alicia Abbott	On August 5, Alicia Abbott was named the new head coach for the 2020 season.
Maryland	Julie Wright	Vicky Galasso & Tori Finucane	Mark Montgomery	On August 7, Julie Wright stepped down as head softball coach at Maryland after four seasons. On September 9, Mark Montgomery was named the new head coach for the 2020 season.
Mississippi State	Vann Stuedeman		Samantha Ricketts	On July 16, Mississippi State announced that Vann Stuedeman would not return as head coach after 8 seasons. On July 22, Samantha Ricketts was named the new head coach for the 2020 season.
North Carolina A&T			Patti Raduenz	On July 22, Patti Raduenz was named the new head coach for the 2020 season.
Ole Miss	Mike Smith	Ruben Felix		On December 8, Mike Smith announced his resignation as head coach of the Ole Miss softball program. Ruben Felix was named the interim head coach for the 2020 season.
San Diego	Melissa McElvain		Jessica Pistole	On May 21, Melissa McElvain announced her resignation as head coach of the San Diego softball program. On July 30, Jessica Pistole was named the new head coach for the 2020 season.
Santa Clara	Lisa Dodd		Gina Carbonatto	On June 24, Gina Carbonatto was named the new head coach for the 2020 season.
SIU Edwardsville		Jessica Jones		On June 20, SIU Edwardsville appointed interim head softball coach, Jessica Jones, as permanent head coach of the program.
Southern Miss	Wendy Hogue		Brian Levin	On May 10, Wendy Hogue announced her resignation as head coach of the Southern Miss softball program effective immediately. On June 14, Southern Miss announced the hiring of Brian Levin as head coach of the Southern Miss softball program.
Southern Utah	Kortny Hall		Don Don Williams	On July 16, Southern Utah parted ways with Kortny Hall, going 6–34 in one season at the school. On August 22, Don Don Williams was named the new head coach for the 2020 season.
Tennessee Tech	Bonnie Graham		Michelle DePolo	On August 1, Bonnie Graham announced her resignation as head coach of the Tennessee Tech program to take on a new role. On August 19, Michelle DePolo was named the new head coach for the 2020 season.
Texas A&M–Corpus Christi	Blake Miller		Kristen Zaleski	On May 10, Texas A&M-Corpus Christi announced that head coach Blake Miller's contract will not be renewed. On June 20, Texas A&M–Corpus Christi announced the hiring of Kristen Zaleski as head coach of the softball program.
Tulsa	John Bargfeldt		Crissy Strimple	On June 7, John Bargfeldt announced his resignation as head coach of the Tulsa program to pursue better opportunities. On June 12, Tulsa announced that they have promoted Crissy Strimple to head coach of the Tulsa Program. She has spent the last 8 seasons as associate head coach at Tulsa.
Utah Valley	T.J. Hubbard	Shelby Graves	Stacy May-Johnson	On December 11, T.J. Hubbard accepted the head coaching position at UTEP, leaving Utah Valley after three seasons. Assistant Coach Shelby Graves was named interim head coach until a permanent replacement is named. On December 30, Stacy May-Johnson was named the head coach for the 2020 season.
UTEP	Tobin Echo-Hawk		T.J. Hubbard	On November 8, UTEP announced that Tobin Echo-Hawk would not return as head coach after 6 seasons. On December 11, T.J. Hubbard was named the new head coach for the 2020 season.
UT Martin	Donley Canary		Brian Dunn	Canary announced his retirement after 18 seasons at UT Martin on May 14. On June 11, UT Martin announced the hiring of Brian Dunn to be the head coach of the UT Martin softball program.
Western Illinois	Beth Golitko	Holly Van Vlymen		On August 26, Beth Golitko accepted the assistant coaching position at Loyola Chicago, leaving Western Illinois after two seasons. On November 14, Holly Van Vlymen was named the interim head coach for the 2020 season.

== See also ==
- UCLA vs Oklahoma WCWS 2019 Game 2 on YouTube
- NISC Championship Round - Iowa State vs. UT Arlington on YouTube
- 2019 NCAA Division I baseball season
