= Brian Levin =

American softball coach

Biographical details
- Born: Granite City, Illinois, U.S.
- Education: Peru State College

Coaching career (HC unless noted)
- 2010: Murray State (asst.)
- 2011–2016: UMSL
- 2014–2016: Akron Racers
- 2017–2019: Belmont
- 2020–2022: Southern Miss
- 2023–2024: Iowa (asst.)
- 2025: Iowa (Interim HC)

Head coaching record
- Overall: 405–215 (.653)

Brian Levin is an American softball coach who is currently an assistant coach at Iowa.

== Coaching career ==
=== Belmont ===
On August 8, 2016, Levin was announced as the new head coach of the Belmont softball program. On June 14, 2019, Levin left the Belmont program to become the head coach at Southern Miss.

=== Southern Miss ===
On June 14, 2019, Levin was announced as the new head coach of the Southern Miss softball program. On July 12, 2022, Levin announced his resignation as head coach at Southern Miss, citing a desire to spend more time with his family.

=== Iowa ===
On July 20, 2022, Levin was announced as an assistant coach for the Iowa Hawkeyes softball program. On December 17, 2024, Levin was named interim head coach as Renee Luers-Gillispie took a leave of absence for the 2025 season for a personal health matter. On March 7, 2025, Iowa announced a change in softball leadership, as Levin departed the program.

== Head coaching record ==
=== College ===
Record table
Season	Team	Overall	Conference	Standing	Postseason
UMSL Tritons (Great Lakes Valley Conference) (2011–2016)
2011	UMSL	31–20	20–5	1st	
2012	UMSL	27–25	16–18	5th (West)	
2013	UMSL	41–13	26–4	1st (West)	NCAA Tournament
2014	UMSL	49–8	26–4	1st (West)	NCAA Midwest Super Regional
2015	UMSL	48–8	25–5	1st	NCAA Midwest Super Regional
2016	UMSL	53–9	26–4	2nd	NCAA Tournament
UMSL:		249–83 (.750)	139–40 (.777)		
Belmont Bruins (Ohio Valley Conference) (2017–2019)
2017	Belmont	35–22	10–12	8th	
2018	Belmont	25–25	6–16	10th	
2019	Belmont	31–23	12–10	6th	
Belmont:		91–70 (.565)	28–38 (.424)		
Southern Miss Golden Eagles (Conference USA) (2020–2022)
2020	Southern Miss	14–8	0–0		Season canceled due to COVID-19
2021	Southern Miss	22–31	4–16	6th (West)	
2022	Southern Miss	29–23	9–15	5th (West)	
Southern Miss:		65–62 (.512)	13–31 (.295)		
Total:		405–215 (.653)			
National champion Postseason invitational champion Conference regular season champion Conference regular season and conference tournament champion Division regular season champion Division regular season and conference tournament champion Conference tournament champion
