= 2019 UC Davis Aggies softball team =

American college softball season

2019 UC Davis Aggies softball
- Conference: Big West Conference
- Record: 39–14 (13–8 Big West)
- Head coach: Erin Thorpe (5th season)
- Home stadium: La Rue Field

2019 Big West Conference softball standings
	Conf.				Overall
Team	W		L	PCT	W		L	PCT
Cal State Fullerton ‍†‍‍^{y}	18	–	3	.857	38	–	18	.679
Hawaii ‍‍‍	14	–	7	.667	33	–	16	.673
UC Davis ‍‍‍	13	–	8	.619	39	–	14	.736
Long Beach State ‍‍‍	12	–	9	.571	25	–	25	.500
Cal State Northridge ‍‍‍	10	–	11	.476	26	–	28	.481
UC Riverside ‍‍‍	8	–	13	.381	26	–	25	.510
Cal Poly ‍‍‍	5	–	16	.238	11	–	40	.216
UC Santa Barbara ‍‍‍	4	–	17	.190	10	–	42	.192
† – Conference champion y – Invited to the NCAA tournament As of June 14, 2019; Rankings from NFCA

The 2019 UC Davis Aggies softball team represented the University of California, Davis in the 2019 NCAA Division I softball season. The Aggies were coached by Erin Thorpe in her fifth season, playing their home games at La Rue Field. They finished 39–14 overall, setting a program record for wins since transitioning to the Division I level in 2008, and finished third in the Big West Conference with a 13–8 record.

Sophomore pitcher Brooke Yanez was named the Big West Pitcher of the Year and a second-team All-American by Softball America after she posted a 25–7 record, a 1.03 ERA, and 273 strikeouts. She threw the first perfect game in program Division I history against Sacramento State on March 12, a no-hitter against Cal Poly on April 14, and a program record-tying 18 strikeouts against Hawaii on May 9.

The Aggies set numerous single-season Division I program records during the season. As a team, they established new records in batting average (.278), slugging percentage (.409), on-base percentage (.353), RBI (217), total bases (562), runs (249), home runs (34), fielding percentage (.9698), ERA (1.859), winning percentage (.736) and shutouts (16). Individually, Yanez set new marks in wins, ERA and strikeouts. Senior infielder Meghan Bradbury set records in slugging percentage (.556), RBI (41), home runs (9) and total bases (84) while sophomore outfielder Alyse Rojas set a new record with 44 runs.

== Previous season ==
The Aggies finished the 2018 season 27–24 overall, 9–12 in Big West play, finishing in a tie for fourth place. It was the first winning season, and highest win total, since the program transitioned to the Division I level in 2008.

== Preseason ==
=== Big West Conference coaches poll ===
The Big West Conference coaches poll was released on February 1, 2019. UC Davis was picked to finish third in the Big West Conference with 34 votes and one first-place vote. It was the highest that the team had been voted in the preseason poll since they were picked to finish second in 2011.

Coaches poll
Predicted finish	Team	Votes (1st place)
1	Cal State Fullerton	62 (6)
2	Long Beach State	55 (1)
3	UC Davis	34 (1)
4	Hawai'i	33
5	Cal State Northridge	32
6	UC Riverside	30
7	Cal Poly	26
8	UC Santa Barbara	16

== Roster ==
2019 UC Davis Aggies roster
Pitchers: 1 Katie Kibby – Junior; 10 Frankie Mendoza – Junior; 18 Sara Cadona – Senior; 23 Brooke Yanez – Sophomore; 26 Taliyah Miles – Sophomore; Outfielders: 6 Marisa Given – Junior; 22 Alyse Rojas – Sophomore; 29 Megan Salazar – (redshirt) Senior; 31 Gabby Zagone – Freshman; 44 Caroline Figueroa – Senior; 48 Marissa Jauregui – Junior	Catchers: 12 Katie Steffen-Brune – (redshirt) Freshman; 14 Riley Siegel – Sophomore; Infielders: 5 Sommer Kisling – Freshman; 7 Alex Sotomayor – (redshirt) Senior; 8 Maddie Rojas – Junior; 9 Sophie Mayol – Freshman; 24 Meghan Bradbury – Senior; 28 Delaney Diaz – Freshman; 30 Claudia Kim – Freshman; Utility: 2 Autumn Miller – (redshirt) Junior; 3 Megan Bower – Freshman; 4 Kiana Lee – Sophomore; 21 Isabella Leon – Junior; 27 Alexis Villalobos – Junior

== Schedule ==
Legend
	UC Davis win
	UC Davis loss
*	Non-Conference game

2019 UC Davis Aggies Softball Game Log
Regular season (39–14)

February (11–3)
Date	Opponent	Site/stadium	Score	Win	Loss	Save	Attendance	Overall record	Big West Record
Feb 8	vs Montana*	La Rue Field • Davis, CA	W 2–1	Kibby (1–0)	Stensby (0–1)	None		1–0	
Feb 8	vs Santa Clara*	La Rue Field • Davis, CA	W 10–2^{5}	Yanez (1–0)	Kim (0–1)	None		2–0	
Feb 9	vs Montana*	La Rue Field • Davis, CA	W 10–4	Cadona (1–0)	Achenbach (0–1)	None		3–0	
Feb 9	vs Cal State Bakersfield*	La Rue Field • Davis, CA	Cancelled						
Feb 10	vs Nevada*	La Rue Field • Davis, CA	Cancelled						
Feb 15	Weber State*	Stephanie Lynn Park • Henderson, NV	L 2–7	Su'esu'e (2–1)	Kibby (1–1)	None		3–1	
Feb 15	BYU*	Stephanie Lynn Park • Henderson, NV	W 4–2	Yanez (2–0)	Paulson (0–1)	None		4–1	
Feb 16	UTEP*	Stephanie Lynn Park • Henderson, NV	W 15–2^{5}	Yanez (3–0)	Orozco (0–1)	None		5–1	
Feb 16	Miami (OH)*	Stephanie Lynn Park • Henderson, NV	L 6–7^{8}	Pratt (1–0)	Yanez (3–1)	None		5–2	
Feb 17	Georgetown*	Stephanie Lynn Park • Henderson, NV	W 5–4^{8}	Yanez (4–1)	Diller (0–1)	None	200	6–2	
Feb 19	vs Pacific*	La Rue Field • Davis, CA	Postponed						
Feb 21	vs UTEP*	La Rue Field • Davis, CA	W 4–1	Yanez (5–1)	Wright (1–3)	None		7–2	
Feb 21	vs UTEP*	La Rue Field • Davis, CA	W 2–1	Kibby (2–1)	McKechnie (1–3)	Cadona (1)	42	8–2	
Feb 22	vs Seattle*	La Rue Field • Davis, CA	W 1–0^{5}	Yanez (6–1)	Nance (3–3)	None		9–2	
Feb 23	vs Seattle*	La Rue Field • Davis, CA	W 3–1	Yanez (7–1)	Larkins (2–1)	None		10–2	
Feb 23	vs Idaho State*	La Rue Field • Davis, CA	L 2–3	Mulcahy (1–1)	Kibby (2–2)	Pease (1)		10–3	
Feb 24	vs Saint Mary's*	La Rue Field • Davis, CA	W 6–0	Kibby (3–2)	Perez (0–6)	None	252	11–3	
Feb 26	at Sacramento State*	Shea Stadium • Sacramento, CA	Postponed						

March (16–3)
Date	Opponent	Site/stadium	Score	Win	Loss	Save	Attendance	Overall record	Big West Record
Mar 1	Boise State*	USD Softball Complex • San Diego, CA	L 4–9	Broadus (6–0)	Kibby (3–3)	Mancha (1)		11–4	
Mar 1	Weber State*	USD Softball Complex • San Diego, CA	W 9–0^{6}	Yanez (8–1)	Su'esu'e (2–3)	None	179	12–4	
Mar 3	at San Diego*	USD Softball Complex • San Diego, CA	W 2–1	Yanez (9–1)	Boos (0–1)	None	411	13–4	
Mar 8	Northern Kentucky*	Spartan Softball Field • San Jose, CA	W 3–0	Kibby (4–3)	Koperdak (0–5)	None	111	14–4	
Mar 8	at San Jose State*	Spartan Softball Field • San Jose, CA	W 6–5	Yanez (10–1)	Aurin (1–2)	None	137	15–4	
Mar 9	Weber State*	Spartan Softball Field • San Jose, CA	W 13–8	Kibby (5–3)	Su'esu'e (3–5)	None	102	16–4	
Mar 9	Nevada*	SCU Softball Field • Santa Clara, CA	W 9–1^{5}	Yanez (11–1)	Sargent (1–5)	None	100	17–4	
Mar 12	vs Sacramento State*	La Rue Field • Davis, CA	W 4–0	Yanez (12–1)	Corr (8–6)	None	88	18–4	
Mar 15	vs Santa Clara	La Rue Field • Davis, CA	W 6–0	Yanez (13–1)	Anderson (1–6)	None	57	19–4	
Mar 15	vs Rider	La Rue Field • Davis, CA	L 1–2^{8}	Trujillo (1–4)	Kibby (5–4)	None	57	19–5	
Mar 16	vs Fairleigh Dickinson	La Rue Field • Davis, CA	W 5–0	Kibby (6–4)	Portis (2–7)	None		20–5	
Mar 16	vs Marist*	La Rue Field • Davis, CA	W 6–0	Yanez (14–1)	Peterson (1–2)	None	246	21–5	
Mar 17	vs Rider*	La Rue Field • Davis, CA	W 13–0^{5}	Cadona (2–0)	Trujillo (1–5)	None	54	22–5	
Mar 23	vs Marist*	La Rue Field • Davis, CA	W 4–0	Kibby (7–4)	Phippen (7–1)	None		23–5	
Mar 23	vs Marist*	La Rue Field • Davis, CA	W 3–0	Yanez (15–1)	Leeseberg (0–4)	None	185	24–5	
Mar 27	at California*	Levine-Fricke Field • Berkeley, CA	W 2–1	Yanez (16–1)	Dung (8–5)	None	178	25–5	
Mar 30	vs Cal State Northridge	La Rue Field • Davis, CA	W 4–2	Yanez (17–1)	James (10–8)	None		26–5	1–0
Mar 30	vs Cal State Northridge	La Rue Field • Davis, CA	W 1–0	Kibby (8–4)	Jamerson (5–5)	None	97	27–5	2–0
Mar 31	vs Cal State Northridge	La Rue Field • Davis, CA	L 1–2	James (11–8)	Yanez (17–2)	None	169	27–6	2–1

April (9–5)
Date–	Opponent	Site/stadium	Score	Win	Loss	Save	Attendance	Overall record	Big West Record
Apr 6	at UC Santa Barbara	Campus Diamond • Santa Barbara, CA	W 3–0	Yanez (18–2)	Noriega (5–13)	None	170	28–6	3–1
Apr 6	at UC Santa Barbara	Campus Diamond • Santa Barbara, CA	L 1–3	Gulvin (1–8)	Kibby (8–5)	None	170	28–7	3–2
Apr 7	at UC Santa Barbara	Campus Diamond • Santa Barbara, CA	W 9–0	Yanez (19–2)	Noriega (5–14)	None	150	29–7	4–2
Apr 13	vs Cal Poly	La Rue Field • Davis, CA	L 0–1	Best (3–18)	Yanez (19–3)	None		29–8	4–3
Apr 13	vs Cal Poly	La Rue Field • Davis, CA	W 7–0	Kibby (9–5)	Casper (1–7)	None	321	30–8	5–3
Apr 14	vs Cal Poly	La Rue Field • Davis, CA	W 5–0	Yanez (20–3)	Best (3–19)	None	366	31–8	6–3
Apr 19	at UC Riverside	Amy S. Harrison Field • Riverside, CA	W 3–1	Yanez (21–3)	Olmos (5–8)	None	71	32–8	7–3
Apr 20	at UC Riverside	Amy S. Harrison Field • Riverside, CA	W 9–5	Kibby (10–5)	Boles (10–6)	Yanez (1)	212	33–8	8–3
Apr 20	at UC Riverside	Amy S. Harrison Field • Riverside, CA	W 11–1^{5}	Yanez (22–3)	Olmos (5–9)	None	224	34–8	9–3
Apr 23	vs Pacific*	La Rue Field • Davis, CA	W 9–4	Kibby (11–5)	Sutherlin (4–6)	None	47	35–8	
Apr 27	vs Cal State Fullerton	La Rue Field • Davis, CA	L 1–9^{5}	Martinez (13–5)	Yanez (22–4)	None		35–9	9–4
Apr 27	vs Cal State Fullerton	La Rue Field • Davis, CA	W 2–1^{9}	Yanez (23–4)	Martinez (13–6)	None	297	36–9	10–4
Apr 28	vs Cal State Fullerton	La Rue Field • Davis, CA	L 1–5	Martinez (14–6)	Yanez (23–5)	None	273	36–10	10–5
Apr 30	at Sacramento State*	Shea Stadium • Sacramento, CA	L 1–6	Corr (19–10)	Kibby (11–6)	None	124	36–11	

May (3–3)
Date	Opponent	Site/stadium	Score	Win	Loss	Save	Attendance	Overall record	Big West Record
May 4	at Long Beach State	LBSU Softball Complex • Long Beach, CA	L 2–3	White (10–10)	Yanez (23–6)	None	374	36–12	10–6
May 4	at Long Beach State	LBSU Softball Complex • Long Beach, CA	L 0–10^{5}	Coleman (12–11)	Kibby (11–6)	None	374	36–13	10–7
May 5	at Long Beach State	LBSU Softball Complex • Long Beach, CA	W 4–1	Yanez (24–6)	White (10–11)	None	219	37–13	11–7
May 9	at Hawaii	Rainbow Wahine Softball Stadium • Honolulu, HI	L 1–2^{12}	Hitchcock (20–7)	Yanez (24–7)	None		37–14	11–8
May 9	at Hawaii	Rainbow Wahine Softball Stadium • Honolulu, HI	W 7–3	Kibby (12–7)	Murphy (2–1)	None	571	38–14	12–8
May 10	at Hawaii	Rainbow Wahine Softball Stadium • Honolulu, HI	W 5–1	Yanez (25–7)	Hitchcock (20–8)	None	780	39–14	13–8

== Awards and honors ==
Weekly Awards
Player	Award	Date Awarded	Ref.
Meghan Bradbury	Big West Player of the Week	February 11, 2019	
Brooke Yanez	Big West Pitcher of the Week	February 18, 2019	
Brooke Yanez	Big West Pitcher of the Week	February 25, 2019	
Brooke Yanez	Big West Pitcher of the Week	March 18, 2019	
Brooke Yanez	NFCA National Pitcher of the Week	March 19, 2019	
Brooke Yanez	Big West Pitcher of the Week	April 8, 2019	
Marisa Given	Big West Player of the Week	April 15, 2019	
Brooke Yanez	Big West Pitcher of the Week	April 15, 2019	
Brooke Yanez	Big West Pitcher of the Week	May 13, 2019	

Individual Awards
Player	Award	Ref.
Brooke Yanez	Big West Pitcher of the Year	

All-Big West
Player	Selection	Ref.
Alyse Rojas	First team	
Brooke Yanez	First team	
Marisa Given	Second team	
Isabella Leon	Second team	
Katie Kibby	Honorable mention	
Maddie Rojas	Honorable mention	

NFCA All-Pacific Region
Player	Selection	Ref.
Brooke Yanez	First team	
