= Ashley Obrest =

American softball coach

Biographical details
- Born: Elmwood Park, Illinois, U.S.
- Education: Boston College

Playing career
- 2004–2007: Boston College

Coaching career (HC unless noted)
- 2007–2008: Chicago White Sox Training Academy (Hitting/Catching Instructor)
- 2007–2008: Concordia - Chicago (asst.)
- 2008–2010: Colgate (asst.)
- 2011: Colgate
- 2012–2019: Boston College
- 2020–2021: Boston University (Volunteer asst.)
- 2023: Northern Kentucky (asst.)

Head coaching record
- Overall: 229–240 (.488)
- Tournaments: NCAA: – (–)

Accomplishments and honors

Championships
- Patriot Regular Season Champions (2011)

Ashley Obrest is an American softball coach. She is a former volunteer assistant coach at Boston University and former assistant coach at Northern Kentucky. She is the former head coach at Boston College and Colgate. On August 8, 2011, she announced as top coach of softball at Boston University

== Coaching career ==
=== Boston College (2012-2019) ===
On August 8, 2011, Ashley Obrest was announced as the new head coach of the Boston College softball program. On May 21, 2019, Obrest resigned as head coach of the Boston College softball program.

=== Boston University (2020-2021) ===
On December 17, 2019, Ashley Obrest was added as a volunteer assistant coach for the Boston University softball program.

Northern Kentucky University (2023)

On December 30, 2022, Ashley Obrest was named assistant coach for Northern Kentucky University softball.

== Head coaching record ==
=== College ===
Record table
Season	Team	Overall	Conference	Standing	Postseason
Colgate Raiders (Patriot League) (2011–present)
2011	Colgate	27–21	16–3	1st	
Colgate:		27–21 (.563)	16–3 (.842)		
Boston College Eagles (Atlantic Coast Conference) (2012–2019)
2012	Boston College	23–30	3–18	8th	
2013	Boston College	14–38	2–19	8th	
2014	Boston College	30–23	12–14	7th	
2015	Boston College	27–25	6–15	8th	
2016	Boston College	30–23	12–9	4th	
2017	Boston College	31–22	14–9	T–3rd	
2018	Boston College	30–23	13–10	T–2nd (Atlantic)	
2019	Boston College	17–35	4–20	6th (Atlantic)	
Boston College:		202–219 (.480)	66–114 (.367)		
Total:		229–240 (.488)			
National champion Postseason invitational champion Conference regular season champion Conference regular season and conference tournament champion Division regular season champion Division regular season and conference tournament champion Conference tournament champion
