= 2019 Arizona Wildcats softball team =

American college softball season

2019 Arizona Wildcats softball

NCAA Tucson Super Regional champion NCAA Tucson Regional champion

Women's College World Series, 1–2
- Conference: Pacific-10 Conference
- Record: 48–14 (19–5 Pac-10)
- Head coach: Mike Candrea (34th season)
- Home stadium: Rita Hillenbrand Memorial Stadium

2019 Pac-12 Conference softball standings
	Conf.				Overall
Team	W		L	PCT	W		L	PCT
No. 3 UCLA ‍†‍‍^{y}	20	–	4	.833	56	–	6	.903
No. 2 Washington ‍†‍‍^{y}	20	–	4	.833	52	–	8	.867
No. 6 Arizona ‍‍‍^{y}	19	–	5	.792	48	–	14	.774
Arizona State ‍‍‍^{y}	13	–	11	.542	35	–	20	.636
Stanford ‍‍‍^{y}	8	–	13	.381	33	–	19	.635
Oregon State ‍‍‍	8	–	14	.364	26	–	19	.578
Utah ‍‍‍	7	–	17	.292	19	–	35	.352
California ‍‍‍	5	–	18	.217	28	–	27	.509
Oregon ‍‍‍	5	–	19	.208	22	–	30	.423
† – Conference champion y – Invited to the NCAA tournament As of June 5, 2019; Rankings from NFCA

The 2019 Arizona Wildcats softball team represented the University of Arizona in the 2019 NCAA Division I softball season. The Wildcats were coached by Mike Candrea, who led his thirty-fourth season. The Wildcats finished with a record of 48–14. They competed in the Pacific-10 Conference, where they finished in a third with a 19–5 record.

The Wildcats were invited to the 2019 NCAA Division I softball tournament, where they won the Tucson Regional and Super Regional and advanced to the Women's College World Series. They finished tied for fifth place with a win against Washington and losses to eventual champion UCLA and semifinalist Alabama.

== Personnel ==
=== Roster ===
2019 Arizona Wildcats roster
Pitchers: 7 - Hanah Bowen - Sophomore; 18 - Taylor McQuillin - Senior; 22 - Alyssa Denham - Junior; 23 - Vanessa Foreman - Freshman; 24 - Gina Snyder - (redshirt) Senior; 71 - Marissa Schuld - Freshman; 88 - Tamara Statman - Senior; Catchers: 8 - Dejah Mulipola - Junior; 11 - Hillary Edior - Senior; 15 - Izzy Pacho - Freshman	Infielders: 2 - Hannah Martinez - Sophomore; 5 - Reyna Carranco - Junior; 17 - Malia Martinez - Junior; 19 - Jessie Harper - Junior; 33 - Joelle Krist - Senior; 36 - Rylee Pierce - Senior	Outfielders: 4 - Carli Campbell - (redshirt) Sophomore; 9 - Taryn Young - Sophomore; 21 - Riley Kuderca - Freshman; 32 - Alyssa Palomino-Cardoza - (redshirt) Junior; 44 - Jenna Kean - Sophomore; Utility: 12 - Ivy Davis - Sophomore

=== Coaches ===
2019 Arizona Wildcats softball coaching staff
- Mike Candrea - Head coach - 34th season
- Caitlin Lowe - Assistant coach - 6th season
- Taryne Mowatt - Assistant coach - 2nd season

== Schedule ==
Legend
	Arizona win
	Arizona loss
*	Non-Conference game

2019 Arizona Wildcats softball game log
Regular season

February
Date	Opponent	Site/stadium	Score	Overall record	Pac-10 record
Feb 8	vs No. 19 Michigan*	USF Softball Stadium • Tampa, FL (USF Wilson Tournament)	W 2–1	1–0	
Feb 8	at South Florida*	USF Softball Stadium • Tampa, FL (USF Wilson Tournament)	W 4–1	2–0	
Feb 9	vs No. 5 Florida*	USF Softball Stadium • Tampa, FL (USF Wilson Tournament)	L 2–3	2–1	
Feb 9	vs Illinois State*	USF Softball Stadium • Tampa, FL (USF Wilson Tournament)	W 9–1 ^{(5)}	3–1	
Feb 10	vs NC State*	USF Softball Stadium • Tampa, FL (USF Wilson Tournament)	L 1–4	3–2	
Feb 15	South Florida*	Rita Hillenbrand Memorial Stadium • Tucson, AZ (Hillenbrand Invitational)	L 1–4	3–3	
Feb 15	UIC*	Rita Hillenbrand Memorial Stadium • Tucson, AZ (Hillenbrand Invitational)	W 10–1 ^{(5)}	4–3	
Feb 16	No. 7 Alabama*	Rita Hillenbrand Memorial Stadium • Tucson, AZ (Hillenbrand Invitational)	L 1–6	4–4	
Feb 16	New Mexico*	Rita Hillenbrand Memorial Stadium • Tucson, AZ (Hillenbrand Invitational)	W 15–1 ^{(5)}	5–4	
Feb 17	Cal State Fullerton*	Rita Hillenbrand Memorial Stadium • Tucson, AZ (Hillenbrand Invitational)	W 6–0 ^{(5)}	6–4	
Feb 22	vs No. 20 Oklahoma State*	Big League Dreams Sports Park • Cathedral City, CA (Mary Nutter Collegiate Classic)	W 3–0	7–4	
Feb 22	vs Long Beach State*	Big League Dreams Sports Park • Cathedral City, CA (Mary Nutter Collegiate Classic)	W 12–3	8–4	
Feb 23	vs UC Santa Barbara*	Big League Dreams Sports Park • Cathedral City, CA (Mary Nutter Collegiate Classic)	W 9–1 ^{(5)}	9–4	
Feb 23	vs No. 4 Oklahoma*	Big League Dreams Sports Park • Cathedral City, CA (Mary Nutter Collegiate Classic)	L 1–2	9–5	
Feb 28	Drake*	Rita Hillenbrand Memorial Stadium • Tucson, AZ (Wildcat Invitational)	W 4–0	10–5	

March
Date	Opponent	Site/stadium	Score	Overall record	Pac-10 record
Mar 1	Drake*	Rita Hillenbrand Memorial Stadium • Tucson, AZ (Wildcat Invitational)	W 9–4	11–5	
Mar 1	Kent State*	Rita Hillenbrand Memorial Stadium • Tucson, AZ (Wildcat Invitational)	W 10–0 ^{(5)}	12–5	
Mar 2	No. 23 Minnesota*	Rita Hillenbrand Memorial Stadium • Tucson, AZ (Wildcat Invitational)	W 2–0	13–5	
Mar 2	Kent State*	Rita Hillenbrand Memorial Stadium • Tucson, AZ (Wildcat Invitational)	W 7–6 ^{(8)}	14–5	
Mar 3	No. 19 James Madison*	Rita Hillenbrand Memorial Stadium • Tucson, AZ (Wildcat Invitational)	W 8–6 ^{(8)}	15–5	
Mar 5	at New Mexico State*	NM State Softball Complex • Las Cruces, NM	W 11–3 ^{(6)}	16–5	
Mar 5	at New Mexico State*	NM State Softball Complex • Las Cruces, NM	W 11–1 ^{(5)}	17–5	
Mar 8	No. 1 Florida State*	Rita Hillenbrand Memorial Stadium • Tucson, AZ	L 3–5	17–6	
Mar 9	No. 1 Florida State*	Rita Hillenbrand Memorial Stadium • Tucson, AZ	W 11–3 ^{(5)}	18–6	
Mar 10	No. 1 Florida State*	Rita Hillenbrand Memorial Stadium • Tucson, AZ	L 3–4	18–7	
Mar 15	Oregon	Rita Hillenbrand Memorial Stadium • Tucson, AZ	W 8–0 ^{(6)}	19–7	1–0
Mar 16	Oregon	Rita Hillenbrand Memorial Stadium • Tucson, AZ	W 8–0 ^{(5)}	20–7	2–0
Mar 17	Oregon	Rita Hillenbrand Memorial Stadium • Tucson, AZ	W 8–3	21–7	3–0
Mar 22	at Oregon State	Oregon State Softball Complex • Corvallis, OR	W 9–1 ^{(5)}	22–7	4–0
Mar 23	at Oregon State	Oregon State Softball Complex • Corvallis, OR	W 11–4	23–7	5–0
Mar 24	at Oregon State	Oregon State Softball Complex • Corvallis, OR	W 4–0	24–7	6–0
Mar 29	No. 17 Arizona State	Rita Hillenbrand Memorial Stadium • Tucson, AZ	W 8–0 ^{(5)}	25–7	7–0
Mar 30	No. 17 Arizona State	Rita Hillenbrand Memorial Stadium • Tucson, AZ	W 8–0 ^{(5)}	26–7	8–0
Mar 31	No. 17 Arizona State	Rita Hillenbrand Memorial Stadium • Tucson, AZ	W 2–0	27–7	9–0

April
Date	Opponent	Site/stadium	Score	Overall record	Pac-10 record
Apr 3	UTEP*	Rita Hillenbrand Memorial Stadium • Tucson, AZ	W 17–1 ^{(5)}	28–7	
Apr 3	UTEP*	Rita Hillenbrand Memorial Stadium • Tucson, AZ	W 5–1	29–7	
Apr 5	at Utah	Dumke Family Softball Stadium • Salt Lake City, UT	W 13–0 ^{(5)}	30–7	10–0
Apr 6	at Utah	Dumke Family Softball Stadium • Salt Lake City, UT	W 22–1 ^{(5)}	31–7	11–0
Apr 7	at Utah	Dumke Family Softball Stadium • Salt Lake City, UT	W 13–2 ^{(5)}	32–7	12–0
Apr 12	at Grand Canyon*	GCU Softball Stadium • Phoenix, AZ	W 6–0	33–7	
Apr 12	at Grand Canyon*	GCU Softball Stadium • Phoenix, AZ	W 2–0 ^{(8)}	34–7	
Apr 13	at Grand Canyon*	GCU Softball Stadium • Phoenix, AZ	W 8–1	35–7	
Apr 18	Stanford	Rita Hillenbrand Memorial Stadium • Tucson, AZ	W 7–0	36–7	13–0
Apr 19	Stanford	Rita Hillenbrand Memorial Stadium • Tucson, AZ	W 9–1 ^{(5)}	37–7	14–0
Apr 20	Stanford	Rita Hillenbrand Memorial Stadium • Tucson, AZ	W 13–2 ^{(5)}	38–7	15–0
Apr 26	at California	Levine-Fricke Field • Berkeley, CA	W 6–3	39–7	16–0
Apr 27	at California	Levine-Fricke Field • Berkeley, CA	L 0–1 ^{(9)}	39–8	16–1
Apr 28	at California	Levine-Fricke Field • Berkeley, CA	W 4–1	40–8	17–1

May
Date	Opponent	Site/stadium	Score	Overall record	Pac-10 record
May 3	No. 3 Washington	Rita Hillenbrand Memorial Stadium • Tucson, AZ	L 1–2	40–9	17–2
May 4	No. 3 Washington	Rita Hillenbrand Memorial Stadium • Tucson, AZ	L 1–3	40–10	17–3
May 5	No. 3 Washington	Rita Hillenbrand Memorial Stadium • Tucson, AZ	L 4–7	40–11	17–4
May 9	at No. 3 UCLA	Easton Stadium • Los Angeles, CA	W 5–3	41–11	18–4
May 10	at No. 3 UCLA	Easton Stadium • Los Angeles, CA	L 4–5	41–12	18–5
May 11	at No. 3 UCLA	Easton Stadium • Los Angeles, CA	W 3–1	42–12	19–5

Postseason

NCAA Tucson Regional
Date	Opponent	Site/stadium	Score	Overall record	NCAAT record
May 17	Harvard	Rita Hillenbrand Memorial Stadium • Tucson, AZ	W 5–1	43–12	1–0
May 18	No. 24 Auburn	Rita Hillenbrand Memorial Stadium • Tucson, AZ	W 2–1	44–12	2–0
May 19	No. 24 Auburn	Rita Hillenbrand Memorial Stadium • Tucson, AZ	W 12–3	45–12	3–0

NCAA Tucson Super Regional
Date	Opponent	Site/stadium	Score	Overall record	NCAAT record
May 24	No. 17 Ole Miss	Rita Hillenbrand Memorial Stadium • Tucson, AZ	W 5–2	46–12	1–0
May 25	No. 17 Ole Miss	Rita Hillenbrand Memorial Stadium • Tucson, AZ	W 9–1	47–12	2–0

NCAA Women's College World Series
Date	Opponent	Site/stadium	Score	Overall record	WCWS Record
May 30	No. 2 Washington	ASA Hall of Fame Stadium • Oklahoma City, OK	W 3–1 ^{(8)}	48–12	1–0
May 31	No. 3 UCLA	ASA Hall of Fame Stadium • Oklahoma City, OK	L 2–6	48–13	1–1
June 1	No. 5 Alabama	ASA Hall of Fame Stadium • Oklahoma City, OK	L 0–2	48–14	1–2
