= 2019 Oklahoma Sooners softball team =

American college softball season

2019 Oklahoma Sooners softball

NCAA Norman Regional champion NCAA Norman Super Regional champion Big 12 champion

Women's College World Series, runner-up
- Conference: Big 12 Conference
- Record: 57–6 (18–0 Big 12)
- Head coach: Patty Gasso (25th season)
- Home stadium: OU Softball Complex

2019 Big 12 Conference softball standings
| | Conf. | | | | Overall |
| Team | W | | L | PCT | W | | L | PCT |
|---|---|---|---|---|---|---|---|---|
| No. 2 Oklahoma ‍†‍‡‍^{y} | 18 | – | 0 | 1.000 | 57 | – | 6 | .905 |
| No. 6 Oklahoma State ‍‍‍^{y} | 13 | – | 5 | .722 | 45 | – | 17 | .726 |
| No. 11 Texas ‍‍‍^{y} | 12 | – | 6 | .667 | 46 | – | 17 | .730 |
| No. 19 Texas Tech ‍‍‍^{y} | 8 | – | 10 | .444 | 42 | – | 16 | .724 |
| Iowa State ‍‍‍ | 7 | – | 11 | .389 | 37 | – | 25 | .597 |
| Kansas ‍‍‍ | 3 | – | 15 | .167 | 15 | – | 36 | .294 |
| Baylor ‍‍‍ | 2 | – | 16 | .111 | 18 | – | 31 | .367 |
† – Conference champion ‡ – Tournament champion y – Invited to the NCAA tournament As of June 13, 2019; Rankings from NFCA

The 2019 Oklahoma Sooners softball team represented the University of Oklahoma in the 2019 NCAA Division I softball season. The Sooners were coached by Patty Gasso, who led her eighteenth season. The Sooners finished with a record of 57–6.

The Sooners were invited to the 2019 NCAA Division I Softball Tournament, where they swept the NCAA Norman Regional and Super Regional and then completed a run to the title game of the Women's College World Series where they fell to champion UCLA.

== Personnel ==
=== Roster ===
2019 Oklahoma Sooners roster
| Pitchers: 4 - Shannon Saile - Junior; 42 - Mariah Lopez - Junior; 45 - Giselle Juarez - Junior; 63 - Brooke Vestal - Freshman; 73 - Parker Conrad - Junior | Catchers: 1 - Kinsey Koeltzow - Freshman; 22 - Lynnsie Elam - Sophomore; Outfielders: 7 - Alexa Schultz - Sophomore; 24 - Raegan Rogers - Senior; 27 - Kylie Lundberg - Senior; 34 - Falepolima Aviu - Senior; 99 - Audrie LaValley - Freshman | Infielders: 2 - Sydney Romero - Senior; 3 - Grace Lyons - Freshman; 17 - Shay Knighten - Senior; 20 - Caleigh Clifton - Senior; 33 - Sami Skelly - Freshman; Utility: 11 - Nicole Mendes - Junior; 15 - Eliyah Flores - Sophomore; 21 - Grace Green - Freshman; 78 - Jocelyn Alo - Sophomore |

=== Coaches ===
2019 Oklahoma Sooners softball coaching staff
- - Patty Gasso - Head Coach - 25th Season
- - Jennifer Rocha - Associate Head Coach - 1st season
- - JT Gasso - Assistant Coach - 4th season
- - Keilani Ricketts - Volunteer Assistant Coach - 1st season

== Schedule ==
Legend
| | Oklahoma win |
| | Oklahoma loss |
| * | Non-Conference game |

2019 Oklahoma Sooners softball game log
Regular season

February
| Date | Opponent | Site/stadium | Score | Overall record | Big 12 record |
|---|---|---|---|---|---|
| Feb 8 | vs Syracuse* | GCU Softball Stadium • Phoenix, AZ (GCU Kickoff Tournament) | W 6–0 | 1–0 | |
| Feb 8 | at Grand Canyon* | GCU Softball Stadium • Phoenix, AZ (GCU Kickoff Tournament) | W 7–1 | 2–0 | |
| Feb 9 | vs Charlotte* | GCU Softball Stadium • Phoenix, AZ (GCU Kickoff Tournament) | W 13–0^{5} | 3–0 | |
| Feb 9 | vs Syracuse* | GCU Softball Stadium • Phoenix, AZ (GCU Kickoff Tournament) | W 9–1^{5} | 4–0 | |
| Feb 10 | vs San Diego State* | GCU Softball Stadium • Phoenix, AZ (GCU Kickoff Tournament) | W 9–0^{5} | 5–0 | |
| Feb 14 | vs Kentucky* | Eddie C. Moore Complex • Clearwater, FL (St. Pete/Clearwater Elite Invitational) | W 9–1^{6} | 6–0 | |
| Feb 14 | vs Notre Dame* | Eddie C. Moore Complex • Clearwater, FL (St. Pete/Clearwater Elite Invitational) | W 6–2 | 7–0 | |
| Feb 15 | vs Florida Atlantic* | Eddie C. Moore Complex • Clearwater, FL (St. Pete/Clearwater Elite Invitational) | W 4–0 | 8–0 | |
| Feb 15 | vs Florida State* | Eddie C. Moore Complex • Clearwater, FL (St. Pete/Clearwater Elite Invitational) | L 4–7 | 8–1 | |
| Feb 16 | vs Hofstra* | Eddie C. Moore Complex • Clearwater, FL (St. Pete/Clearwater Elite Invitational) | W 17–3^{5} | 9–1 | |
| Feb 22 | vs BYU* | Big League Dreams Sports Complex • Cathedral City, CA (Mary Nutter Collegiate Classic) | W 5–0 | 10–1 | |
| Feb 22 | vs UCLA* | Big League Dreams Sports Complex • Cathedral City, CA (Mary Nutter Collegiate Classic) | L 1–7 | 10–2 | |
| Feb 23 | vs Arizona* | Big League Dreams Sports Complex • Cathedral City, CA (Mary Nutter Collegiate Classic) | W 2–1 | 11–2 | |
| Feb 24 | vs Cal State Fullerton* | Big League Dreams Sports Complex • Cathedral City, CA (Mary Nutter Collegiate Classic) | W 9–1^{5} | 12–2 | |
| Feb 24 | vs UC Santa Barbara* | Big League Dreams Sports Complex • Cathedral City, CA (Mary Nutter Collegiate Classic) | W 8–0^{6} | 13–2 | |

March
| Date | Opponent | Site/stadium | Score | Overall record | Big 12 record |
|---|---|---|---|---|---|
| Mar 1 | Oregon State* | OU Softball Complex • Norman, OK | W 3–0 | 14–2 | |
| Mar 1 | Louisiana* | OU Softball Complex • Norman, OK | W 9–1^{5} | 15–2 | |
| Mar 5 | McNeese State* | OU Softball Complex • Norman, OK | W 6–1 | 16–2 | |
| Mar 8 | Northwestern* | OU Softball Complex • Norman, OK | W 7–0 | 17–2 | |
| Mar 9 | Drake* | OU Softball Complex • Norman, OK | W 5–2 | 18–2 | |
| Mar 9 | Grand Canyon* | OU Softball Complex • Norman, OK | W 1–0 | 19–2 | |
| Mar 10 | Northwestern* | OU Softball Complex • Norman, OK | W 8–0^{5} | 20–2 | |
| Mar 14 | vs UC Santa Barbara* | Smith Field • Los Angeles, CA (LMU/CSUN Tournament) | W 12–1 | 21–2 | |
| Mar 14 | at Loyola Marymount* | Smith Field • Los Angeles, CA (LMU/CSUN Tournament) | W 14–0^{5} | 22–2 | |
| Mar 15 | vs Dartmouth* | Matador Diamond • Northridge, CA (LMU/CSUN Tournament) | W 10–0 | 23–2 | |
| Mar 15 | at Cal State Northridge* | Matador Diamond • Northridge, CA (LMU/CSUN Tournament) | W 11–0^{5} | 24–2 | |
| Mar 16 | vs Illinois* | Smith Field • Los Angeles, CA (LMU/CSUN Tournament) | W 11–1^{6} | 25–2 | |
| Mar 20 | North Texas* | OU Softball Complex • Norman, OK | W 8–0^{5} | 26–2 | |
| Mar 22 | at Texas Tech | Rocky Johnson Field • Lubbock, TX | W 5–1 | 27–2 | 1–0 |
| Mar 23 | at Texas Tech | Rocky Johnson Field • Lubbock, TX | W 8–3 | 28–2 | 2–0 |
| Mar 24 | at Texas Tech | Rocky Johnson Field • Lubbock, TX | W 13–1^{6} | 29–2 | 3–0 |
| Mar 27 | Tulsa* | OU Softball Complex • Norman, OK | W 10–1^{5} | 30–2 | |
| Mar 31 | at Utah* | Dumke Family Softball Stadium • Salt Lake City, UT | W 11–2^{6} | 31–2 | |
| Mar 31 | at Utah* | Dumke Family Softball Stadium • Salt Lake City, UT | W 13–3^{5} | 32–2 | |

April
| Date | Opponent | Site/stadium | Score | Overall record | Big 12 record |
|---|---|---|---|---|---|
| Apr 5 | Baylor | OU Softball Complex • Norman, OK | W 7–5 | 33–2 | 4–0 |
| Apr 6 | Baylor | OU Softball Complex • Norman, OK | W 8–0^{5} | 34–2 | 5–0 |
| Apr 7 | Baylor | OU Softball Complex • Norman, OK | W 16–0^{5} | 35–2 | 6–0 |
| Apr 12 | at Kansas | Arrocha Ballpark at Rock Chalk Park • Lawrence, KS | W 10–0^{6} | 36–2 | 7–0 |
| Apr 13 | at Kansas | Arrocha Ballpark at Rock Chalk Park • Lawrence, KS | W 5–0 | 37–2 | 8–0 |
| Apr 14 | at Kansas | Arrocha Ballpark at Rock Chalk Park • Lawrence, KS | W 8–0^{6} | 38–2 | 9–0 |
| Apr 18 | at Texas | Red and Charline McCombs Field • Austin, TX | W 3–1 | 39–2 | 10–0 |
| Apr 19 | at Texas | Red and Charline McCombs Field • Austin, TX | W 4–3^{8} | 40–2 | 11–0 |
| Apr 20 | at Texas | Red and Charline McCombs Field • Austin, TX | W 9–2 | 41–2 | 12–0 |
| Apr 24 | at Wichita State* | Wilkins Stadium • Wichita, KS | W 8–0^{5} | 42–2 | |
| Apr 26 | at Iowa State | Cyclone Sports Complex • Ames, IA | W 8–3 | 43–2 | 13–0 |
| Apr 26 | at Iowa State | Cyclone Sports Complex • Ames, IA | W 9–2 | 44–2 | 14–0 |
| Apr 28 | at Iowa State | Cyclone Sports Complex • Ames, IA | W 14–0^{5} | 45–2 | 15–0 |

May
| Date | Opponent | Site/stadium | Score | Overall record | Big 12 record |
|---|---|---|---|---|---|
| May 4 | Oklahoma State | OU Softball Complex • Norman, OK | W 3–0 | 46–2 | 16–0 |
| May 5 | at Oklahoma State | Cowgirl Stadium • Stillwater, OK | W 7–1 | 47–2 | 17–0 |
| May 5 | at Oklahoma State | Cowgirl Stadium • Stillwater, OK | W 6–1 | 48–2 | 18–0 |

Postseason

Big 12 Tournament
| Date | Opponent | Seed | Site/stadium | Score | Overall record | Big 12T record |
|---|---|---|---|---|---|---|
| May 10 | (4) Texas Tech | (1) | ASA Hall of Fame Stadium • Oklahoma City, OK | W 8–0^{6} | 49–2 | 1–0 |
Tournament canceled due to weather. Oklahoma earns auto-bid as regular season champion.

NCAA Norman Regional
| Date | Opponent | Seed | Site/stadium | Score | Overall record | Reg record |
|---|---|---|---|---|---|---|
| May 17 | UMBC | (1) | OU Softball Complex • Norman, OK | W 12–0^{5} | 50–2 | 1–0 |
| May 18 | Wisconsin | (1) | OU Softball Complex • Norman, OK | W 4–0 | 51–2 | 2–0 |
| May 19 | Wisconsin | (1) | OU Softball Complex • Norman, OK | L 1–2 | 51–3 | 2–1 |
| May 19 | Wisconsin | (1) | OU Softball Complex • Norman, OK | W 2–0 | 52–3 | 3–1 |

NCAA Norman Super Regional
| Date | Opponent | Seed | Site/stadium | Score | Overall record | SR record |
|---|---|---|---|---|---|---|
| May 24 | (16) Northwestern | (1) | OU Softball Complex • Norman, OK | W 3–0 | 53–3 | 1–0 |
| May 25 | (16) Northwestern | (1) | OU Softball Complex • Norman, OK | W 8–0 | 54–3 | 2–0 |

NCAA Women's College World Series
| Date | Opponent | Seed | Site/stadium | Score | Overall record | WCWS Record |
|---|---|---|---|---|---|---|
| May 30 | Alabama | (1) | ASA Hall of Fame Stadium • Oklahoma City, OK | W 3–2 | 55–3 | 1–0 |
| May 31 | Oklahoma State | (1) | ASA Hall of Fame Stadium • Oklahoma City, OK | W 6–1 | 56–3 | 2–0 |
| June 2 | Alabama | (1) | ASA Hall of Fame Stadium • Oklahoma City, OK | L 0–1^{8} | 56–4 | 2–1 |
| June 2 | Alabama | (1) | ASA Hall of Fame Stadium • Oklahoma City, OK | W 7–3 | 57–4 | 3–1 |
| June 3 | UCLA | (1) | ASA Hall of Fame Stadium • Oklahoma City, OK | L 3–16 | 57–5 | 3–2 |
| June 4 | UCLA | (1) | ASA Hall of Fame Stadium • Oklahoma City, OK | L 4–5 | 57–6 | 3–3 |
