= 2019 UCLA Bruins softball team =

American college softball season

2019 UCLA Bruins softball

National Champion NCAA Los Angeles Super Regional champion NCAA Los Angeles Regional champion
- Conference: Pac-12 Conference
- Record: 56–6 (20–4 Pac-12)
- Head coach: Kelly Inouye-Perez (13th season)
- Home stadium: Easton Stadium

2019 Pac-12 Conference softball standings
	Conf.				Overall
Team	W		L	PCT	W		L	PCT
No. 3 UCLA ‍†‍‍^{y}	20	–	4	.833	56	–	6	.903
No. 2 Washington ‍†‍‍^{y}	20	–	4	.833	52	–	8	.867
No. 6 Arizona ‍‍‍^{y}	19	–	5	.792	48	–	14	.774
Arizona State ‍‍‍^{y}	13	–	11	.542	35	–	20	.636
Stanford ‍‍‍^{y}	8	–	13	.381	33	–	19	.635
Oregon State ‍‍‍	8	–	14	.364	26	–	19	.578
Utah ‍‍‍	7	–	17	.292	19	–	35	.352
California ‍‍‍	5	–	18	.217	28	–	27	.509
Oregon ‍‍‍	5	–	19	.208	22	–	30	.423
† – Conference champion y – Invited to the NCAA tournament As of June 5, 2019; Rankings from NFCA

The 2019 UCLA Bruins softball team represented the University of California, Los Angeles in the 2019 college softball season. The Bruins were coached by Kelly Inouye-Perez, in her thirteenth season. The Bruins played their home games at Easton Stadium and finished with a record of 56–6. They competed in the Pac-12 Conference, where they finished tied for first with a 20–4 record.

The Bruins were invited to the 2019 NCAA Division I softball tournament, where they swept the Los Angeles Regional and Super Regional and then completed a run through the Women's College World Series to claim their eleventh Women's College World Series Championship. The Bruins had earlier claimed an AIAW title in 1978 and NCAA titles in 1982, 1984, 1988, 1989, 1990, 1992, 1995, 1999, 2003, 2004, and 2010. The 1995 championship was vacated by the NCAA.

== Personnel ==
=== Roster ===
2019 UCLA Bruins roster
Pitchers: 00 – Rachel Garcia – (redshirt) Junior; 4 – Holly Azevedo – sophomore; 8 – Megan Faraimo – freshman; Catchers: 19 – Colleen Sullivan – freshman; 21 – Taylor Pack – senior; 24 – Shea Moreno – freshman; 25 – Paige Halstead – senior; 52 – Maddie Skibitzki – senior	Infielders: 3 – Briana Perez – sophomore; 10 – Malia Quarles – sophomore; 33 – Brianna Tautalafua – senior; Utility: 14 – Kelli Godin – freshman; 15 – Lauren Brzykcy – sophomore; 20 – Anna Vines – freshman; 32 – Alana Snow – sophomore; 37 – Kinsley Washington – sophomore; 46 – Zoe Shaw – senior; 48 – Bubba Nickles – junior	Outfielders: 5 – Julie Rodriguez – sophomore; 11 – Zia Norris – sophomore; 12 – Stevie Wisz – senior; 22 – Danae Blodgett – senior; 23 – Aaliyah Jordan – (redshirt) Sophomore; 27 – Jacqui Prober – junior

=== Coaches ===
2019 UCLA Bruins softball coaching staff
- Kelly Inouye-Perez – Head coach – 4th season
- Lisa Fernandez – Assistant coach – 21st season
- Kirk Walker – Assistant coach – 7th season
- Kylee Perez – Volunteer assistant coach – 1st season

== Schedule ==
Legend
	UCLA win
	UCLA loss
*	Non-Conference game

2019 UCLA Bruins softball game log
Regular season (46–5)

February (15–0)
Date	Opponent	Site/stadium	Score	Win	Loss	Save	Attendance	Overall record	Pac-12 record
Feb 7	vs UT Arlington*	Rainbow Wahine Softball Stadium; Honolulu, HI	2–1	Faraimo (1–0)	Phillips (0–1)	Garcia (1)	537	1–0	–
Feb 7	vs Fresno State*	Rainbow Wahine Softball Stadium; Honolulu, HI	8–2	Azevedo (1–0)	East (0–1)	—	537	2–0	–
Feb 8	at Hawaii*	Rainbow Wahine Softball Stadium; Honolulu, HI	7–0	Garcia (1–0)	Hitchcock (1–1)	—	720	3–0	–
Feb 9	vs Georgia State*	Rainbow Wahine Softball Stadium; Honolulu, HI	9–1	Azevedo (2–0)	Freeman (0–1)	—	549	4–0	–
Feb 9	vs Saint Mary's*	Rainbow Wahine Softball Stadium; Honolulu, HI	13–1 ^{5}	Garcia (2–0)	Perez (0–2)	—	549	5–0	–
Feb 16	Ole Miss*	Easton Stadium; Los Angeles, CA	4–0	Garcia (3–0)	Finney (2–1)	—	1,328	6–0	–
Feb 16	Fresno State*	Easton Stadium; Los Angeles, CA	8–0 ^{5}	Faraimo (2–0)	Lung (0–1)	—	1,328	7–0	–
Feb 17	UC Riverside*	Easton Stadium; Los Angeles, CA	17–3 ^{5}	Azevedo (3–0)	Casper (0–2)	—	889	8–0	–
Feb 17	Loyola Marymount*	Easton Stadium; Los Angeles, CA	3–1	Garcia (4–0)	Bandimere (4–1)	—	889	9–0	–
Feb 22	vs Oklahoma*	Big League Dreams Sports Park; Cathedral City, CA	7–1	Garcia (5–0)	Lopez (5–1)	—	1,004	10–0	–
Feb 22	vs Missouri*	Big League Dreams Sports Park; Cathedral City, CA	11–3 ^{6}	Faraimo (3–0)	Norman (4–2)	—	129	11–0	–
Feb 23	vs Nebraska*	Big League Dreams Sports Park; Cathedral City, CA	9–1 ^{6}	Azevedo (4–0)	Mergele (1–2)	—	942	12–0	–
Feb 23	vs Kentucky*	Big League Dreams Sports Park; Cathedral City, CA	12–4 ^{6}	Garcia (6–0)	Humes (2–4)	—	487	13–0	–
Feb 24	vs Colorado State*	Big League Dreams Sports Park; Cathedral City, CA	3–0	Faraimo (4–0)	Hutton (3–2)	—	669	14–0	–
Feb 27	vs Florida*	Anderson Family Field; Fullerton, CA	7–1	Azevedo (5–0)	Barnhill (9–1)	—	1,227	15–0	–

March (17–1)
Date	Opponent	Site/stadium	Score	Win	Loss	Save	Attendance	Overall record	Pac-12 record
Mar 1	vs Florida*	Anderson Family Field; Fullerton, CA	4–0	Garcia (7–0)	Lugo (6–1)	—	1,634	16–0	–
Mar 1	vs Michigan*	Anderson Family Field; Fullerton, CA	1–3	Beaubien (3–3)	Faraimo (4–1)	—	1,634	16–1	–
Mar 3	UConn*	Easton Stadium; Los Angeles, CA	4–0	Azevedo (6–0)	Stockley (1–6)	Garcia (2)	991	17–1	–
Mar 8	Robert Morris*	Easton Stadium; Los Angeles, CA	11–0 ^{5}	Faraimo (5–1)	Vatakis (2–4)	—	805	18–1	–
Mar 9	BYU*	Easton Stadium; Los Angeles, CA	8–2	Garcia (8–0)	Moffat (5–5)	—	1,255	19–1	–
Mar 9	Liberty*	Easton Stadium; Los Angeles, CA	4–3	Garcia (9–0)	Cooper (1–2)	—	1,255	20–1	–
Mar 10	vs Boston University*	49er Softball Complex; Long Beach, CA	12–0	Faraimo (6–1)	DuBois (8–2)	—	1,046	21–1	–
Mar 10	at Long Beach State*	49er Softball Complex; Long Beach, CA	5–3 ^{8}	Garcia (10–0)	White (2–6)	—	1,046	22–1	–
Mar 15	at Washington	Husky Softball Stadium; Seattle, WA	3–0	Garcia (11–0)	Alvelo (11–3)	—	1,086	23–1	1–0
Mar 16	at Washington	Husky Softball Stadium; Seattle, WA	4–2 ^{8}	Garcia (12–0)	Plain (9–1)	—	1,491	24–1	2–0
Mar 17	at Washington	Husky Softball Stadium; Seattle, WA	15–6 ^{5}	Faraimo (7–1)	Alvelo (11–4)	—	1,459	25–1	3–0
Mar 24	vs Saint Mary's*	Matador Diamond; Northridge, CA	9–1 ^{5}	Faraimo (8–1)	Earle (3–6)	—	300	26–1	–
Mar 24	at Cal State Northridge*	Matador Diamond; Northridge, CA	6–0	Garcia (13–0)	Jamerson (5–4)	—	629	27–1	–
Mar 25	UC Santa Barbara*	Easton Stadium; Los Angeles, CA	6–0	Azevedo (7–0)	Noriega (5–10)	—	767	28–1	–
Mar 26	Cal State Fullerton*	Easton Stadium; Los Angeles, CA	5–1	Faraimo (9–1)	Dockins (2–5)	—	378	29–1	–
Mar 29	California	Easton Stadium; Los Angeles, CA	3–2 ^{8}	Garcia (14–0)	Conley (6–8)	—	533	30–1	4–0
Mar 30	California	Easton Stadium; Los Angeles, CA	1–0	Faraimo (10–1)	Dung (8–6)	—	1,040	31–1	5–0
Mar 31	California	Easton Stadium; Los Angeles, CA	6–0	Faraimo (11–1)	Conley (6–9)	—	1,003	32–1	6–0

April (11–1)
Date–	Opponent	Site/stadium	Score	Win	Loss	Save	Attendance	Overall record	Pac-12 record
Apr 5	at Arizona State	Alberta B. Farrington Softball Stadium; Tempe, AZ	10–0 ^{5}	Faraimo (12–1)	Mejia (12–6)	—	1,813	33–1	7–0
Apr 6	at Arizona State	Alberta B. Farrington Softball Stadium; Tempe, AZ	9–0 ^{6}	Garcia (15–0)	Anderson (9–6)	—	1,813	34–1	8–0
Apr 7	at Arizona State	Alberta B. Farrington Softball Stadium; Tempe, AZ	16–5 ^{5}	Azevedo (8–0)	Mejia (12–7)	—	1,835	35–1	9–0
Apr 12	Oregon	Easton Stadium; Los Angeles, CA	3–4	Dail (14–8)	Faraimo (12–2)	—	940	35–2	9–1
Apr 13	Oregon	Easton Stadium; Los Angeles, CA	8–3	Garcia (16–0)	Dail (14–9)	—	1,237	36–2	10–1
Apr 14	Oregon	Easton Stadium; Los Angeles, CA	8–1	Garcia (17–0)	Dail (14–10)	—	1,156	37–2	11–1
Apr 18	at Oregon State	Oregon State Softball Complex; Corvallis, OR	8–1	Garcia (18–0)	Mazon (12–11)	—	425	38–2	12–1
Apr 19	at Oregon State	Oregon State Softball Complex; Corvallis, OR	10–2 ^{5}	Faraimo (13–2)	Nelson (6–5)	—	399	39–2	13–1
Apr 20	at Oregon State	Oregon State Softball Complex; Corvallis, OR	7–0	Azevedo (9–0)	Mazon (12–12)	—	771	40–2	14–1
Apr 26	Utah	Easton Stadium; Los Angeles, CA	3–0	Garcia (19–0)	Hilburn (5–12)	—	1,010	41–2	15–1
Apr 27	Utah	Easton Stadium; Los Angeles, CA	9–1 ^{5}	Faraimo (14–2)	Sandez (7–8)	—	1,327	42–2	16–1
Apr 28	Utah	Easton Stadium; Los Angeles, CA	10–0 ^{5}	Azevedo (10–0)	Hilburn (5–13)	—	1,281	43–2	17–1

May (3–3)
Date	Opponent	Site/stadium	Score	Win	Loss	Save	Attendance	Overall record	Pac-12 record
May 3	at Stanford	Boyd & Jill Smith Family Stadium; Stanford, CA	1–2	Lee (11–6)	Faraimo (14–3)	—	643	43–3	17–2
May 4	at Stanford	Boyd & Jill Smith Family Stadium; Stanford, CA	7–4	Garcia (20–0)	Millar (0–1)	—	844	44–3	18–2
May 5	at Stanford	Boyd & Jill Smith Family Stadium; Stanford, CA	4–0	Faraimo (15–3)	Lee (11–7)	Azevedo (1)	899	45–3	19–2
May 9	Arizona	Easton Stadium; Los Angeles, CA	3–5	McQuillin (20–7)	Garcia (20–1)	—	1,150	45–4	19–3
May 10	Arizona	Easton Stadium; Los Angeles, CA	5–4	Azevedo (11–0)	Denham (11–5)	Garcia (3)	1,187	46–4	20–3
May 11	Arizona	Easton Stadium; Los Angeles, CA	1–3	Snyder (5–0)	Azevedo (11–1)	Denham (1)	1,328	46–5	20–4

Postseason (10–1)

NCAA Los Angeles Regional (3–1)
Date	Opponent	Site/stadium	Score	Win	Loss	Save	Attendance	Overall record	NCAAT record
May 17	Weber State	Easton Stadium; Los Angeles, CA	6–0	Garcia (21–1)	Jensen (9–3)	—	985	47–5	1–0
May 18	Missouri	Easton Stadium; Los Angeles, CA	9–1 ^{5}	Garcia (22–1)	Norman (18–11)	—		48–5	2–0
May 19	Missouri	Easton Stadium; Los Angeles, CA	1–5	Norman (19–11)	Faraimo (15–4)	Daniel (11)		48–6	2–1
May 19	Missouri	Easton Stadium; Los Angeles, CA	13–1 ^{5}	Garcia (23–1)	Daniel (2–5)	—	872	49–6	3–1

NCAA Los Angeles Super Regional (2–0)
Date	Opponent	Site/stadium	Score	Win	Loss	Save	Attendance	Overall record	SR record
May 24	James Madison	Easton Stadium; Los Angeles, CA	6–1	Garcia (24–1)	Good (21–7)	—	1,328	50–6	1–0
May 25	James Madison	Easton Stadium; Los Angeles, CA	7–2	Faraimo (16–4)	Good (21–8)	Garcia (4)	1,328	51–6	2–0

NCAA Women's College World Series (5–0)
Date	Opponent	Rank	Site/stadium	Score	Win	Loss	Save	Attendance	Overall record	WCWS record
May 30	(7) Minnesota	(2)	ASA Hall of Fame Stadium; Oklahoma City, OK	7–2	Garcia (25–1)	Fiser (31–8)	—	8,439	52–6	1–0
May 31	(6) Arizona	(2)	ASA Hall of Fame Stadium; Oklahoma City, OK	6–2	Garcia (26–1)	McQuillin (24–8)	—		53–6	2–0
June 1	(3) Washington	(2)	ASA Hall of Fame Stadium; Oklahoma City, OK	3–0 ^{10}	Garcia (27–1)	Alvelo (26–5)	—		54–6	3–0
June 2	(1) Oklahoma	(2)	ASA Hall of Fame Stadium; Oklahoma City, OK	16–3	Garcia (28–1)	Juarez (28–3)	—	8,486	55–6	4–0
June 3	(1) Oklahoma	(2)	ASA Hall of Fame Stadium; Oklahoma City, OK	5–4	Garcia (29–1)	Juarez (28–4)	—	8,373	56–6	5–0
