= 2019 Big 12 Conference softball tournament =

- Teams: 6
- Finals site: ASA Hall of Fame Stadium; Oklahoma City, Oklahoma
- Television: Fox College Sports, FS2

2019 Big 12 Conference softball standings
	Conf.				Overall
Team	W		L	PCT	W		L	PCT
No. 2 Oklahoma ‍†‍‡‍^{y}	18	–	0	1.000	57	–	6	.905
No. 6 Oklahoma State ‍‍‍^{y}	13	–	5	.722	45	–	17	.726
No. 11 Texas ‍‍‍^{y}	12	–	6	.667	46	–	17	.730
No. 19 Texas Tech ‍‍‍^{y}	8	–	10	.444	42	–	16	.724
Iowa State ‍‍‍	7	–	11	.389	37	–	25	.597
Kansas ‍‍‍	3	–	15	.167	15	–	36	.294
Baylor ‍‍‍	2	–	16	.111	18	–	31	.367
† – Conference champion ‡ – Tournament champion y – Invited to the NCAA tournament As of June 13, 2019; Rankings from NFCA

The 2019 Big 12 Conference softball tournament was held in ASA Hall of Fame Stadium located in Oklahoma City, Oklahoma from May 10 through May 11, 2019. All games of the tournament were aired on Fox College Sports, and the championship game was aired on FS2. Due to Weather conditions, the last 4 games of the Big 12 Tournament were canceled. Therefore the Automatic bid was given to the regular season champion which would be Oklahoma.

== Standings ==
Place	Seed	Team	Conference			Overall		
Place	Seed	Team	W	L	%	W	L	%
1	1	Oklahoma	18	0	1.000	57	6	.905
2	2	Oklahoma State	13	5	.722	45	17	.726
3	3	Texas	12	6	.667	46	17	.730
4	4	Texas Tech	8	10	.444	42	16	.724
5	5	Iowa State	7	11	.389	37	25	.597
6	6	Kansas	3	15	.167	15	36	.294
7		Baylor	2	16	.111	18	31	.367

- Baylor did not participate in the tournament

== Tournament ==
=== Pool A ===
No. 4 Texas Tech vs. No. 6 Kansas

- No. 4 Texas Tech wins 7-3

No. 1 Oklahoma vs. No. 4 Texas Tech

- No. 1 Oklahoma wins 8-0

No. 1 Oklahoma vs. No. 6 Kansas

- Canceled

=== Pool B ===
No. 2 Oklahoma State vs. No. 3 Texas

- No.2 Oklahoma State wins 6-2

No. 3 Texas vs. No. 5 Iowa State

- No. 5 Iowa State wins 2-0

No. 2 Oklahoma State vs. No. 5 Iowa State

- No. 2 Oklahoma State wins 17-2

=== Championship Day ===
Pool A 3rd Place vs. Pool B 3rd Place

- Canceled

Pool A 2nd Place vs. Pool B 2nd Place

- Canceled

Pool A 1st Place vs. Pool B 1st Place

- Canceled

== Schedule ==
Game	Time*	Matchup^{#}	Television	Location	Attendance
First Round – Friday, May 10
1	12:00 p.m.	#2 Oklahoma State 6, #3 Texas 2	Fox College Sports	Integris Field	
2	12:00 p.m.	#4 Texas Tech 7, #6 Kansas 3	FloSoftball	Field 3	
3	3:00 p.m.	#1 Oklahoma 8, #4 Texas Tech 0	Fox College Sports	Integris Field	
4	3:00 p.m.	#5 Iowa State 2, #3 Texas 0	FloSoftball	Field 3	
5	6:00 p.m.	#2 Oklahoma State 17, #5 Iowa State 2	Fox College Sports	Integris Field	
6	Canceled	#1 Oklahoma vs. #6 Kansas	Fox College Sports	Integris Field	
Championship Day – Saturday, May 11
7	Canceled	Pool A 3rd Place vs. #3 Texas	Fox College Sports	Integris Field	
8	Canceled	Pool A 2nd Place vs. #5 Iowa State	Fox College Sports	Integris Field	
9	Canceled	Pool A 1st Place vs. #2 Oklahoma State	Fox Sports 2	Integris Field	
*Game times in EDT. # – Rankings denote tournament seed.

- Fox College Sports games were simulcast in Big 12 country on Fox Sports Southwest, Fox Sports Oklahoma, Fox Sports Midwest, and Fox Sports Kansas City (or their Plus stations when Major League Baseball conflicts arose).
