= 2019 Southern Conference softball tournament =

- Teams: 7
- Format: Double-elimination tournament
- Finals site: Frost Stadium; Chattanooga, Tennessee
- Champions: Chattanooga (14th title)
- Winning coach: Frank Reed

2019 Southern Conference softball standings
	Conf.						Overall
Team	W		L		T	PCT	W		L		T	PCT
UNC Greensboro ‍†‍‍	12	–	5	–	0	.706	33	–	23	–	0	.589
Chattanooga ‍‍‡‍^{y}	11	–	7	–	0	.611	37	–	17	–	0	.685
Samford ‍‍‍	11	–	7	–	0	.611	23	–	31	–	0	.426
Mercer ‍‍‍	10	–	7	–	0	.588	27	–	29	–	0	.482
East Tennessee State ‍‍‍	7	–	11	–	0	.389	22	–	27	–	2	.451
Western Carolina ‍‍‍	5	–	12	–	0	.294	21	–	32	–	0	.396
Furman ‍‍‍	5	–	12	–	0	.294	13	–	38	–	0	.255
† – Conference champion ‡ – Tournament champion y – Invited to the NCAA tournament As of June 14, 2019; Rankings from NFCA

The 2019 Southern Conference softball tournament was held at Frost Stadium on the campus of the University of Tennessee at Chattanooga in Chattanooga, Tennessee, from May 8 through May 11, 2019. Chattanooga won their fourteenth tournament championship and earned the SoCon's automatic bid to the 2019 NCAA Division I softball tournament.

== Bracket ==
Upper round 1	Upper round 2	Upper final	Final
1	UNC Greensboro	9
5	East Tennessee State	1
4	Mercer	1
5	East Tennessee State	5
1	UNC Greensboro	1
3	Chattanooga	3
2	Samford	4
7	Western Carolina	6
7	Western Carolina	1
3	Chattanooga	2
3	Chattanooga	9
6	Furman	5
3	Chattanooga	3	10
1	UNC Greensboro	4	1
Lower round 1	Lower round 2	Lower round 3	Lower final
5	East Tennessee State	5
2	Samford	7	2	Samford	9	1	UNC Greensboro	9
3	Furman	0	5	East Tennessee State	1	4	Mercer	7
4	Mercer	7
4	Mercer	7
7	Western Carolina	4
