= Mark Montgomery (softball) =

American softball coach

Current position
- Title: Head coach

Biographical details
- Born: April 30, 1967 (age 59)
- Education: Eastern Kentucky University; Georgetown College

Coaching career (HC unless noted)

Model Laboratory School
- 1995–1999: Lafayette High School
- 2000: Kentucky (asst.)
- 2001–2002: Georgetown College
- 2003–2010: Centenary
- 2011–2012: Northern Colorado
- 2013–2019: Louisiana Tech
- 2020–2023: Maryland

Head coaching record
- Overall: 654–561 (.538)

Accomplishments and honors

Championships
- 2× MSC tournament (2001, 2002); MSC regular season (2002); 2× Mid-Con tournament (2004, 2005); C-USA regular season (2019); 2× C-USA tournament (2017, 2019); 2× C-USA West Division (2017, 2019)

Awards
- NFCA Mideast Regional Coaching Staff of the Year (2019); MSC Coach of the Year (2002); Kentucky High School Softball Hall of Fame (2004); PCSC Mountain Division Coach of the Year (2011); C-USA SAAC Coaches Choice Award (2014); LSWA Louisiana Coach of the Year (2017); C-USA Coach of the Year (2019)

Mark Montgomery (born April 30, 1967) is an American former college softball head coach who most recently served as the head coach at Maryland.

== Coaching career ==
=== Louisiana Tech ===
On September 24, 2012, Montgomery was announced as the new head coach of the Louisiana Tech softball program.

=== Maryland ===
On September 9, 2019, Montgomery was named the new head coach of the Maryland Terrapins softball program. On July 27, 2023, Montgomery resigned as head coach citing personal reasons. In four seasons at Maryland he led the Terrapins to a 98–78 record.

== Head coaching record ==
Record table
Season	Team	Overall	Conference	Standing	Postseason
Georgetown Tigers (Mid-South Conference) (2001–2002)
2001	Georgetown College	36–15			NAIA Regional
2002	Georgetown College	36–16	20–5	1st	NAIA Regional
Georgetown College:		72–31 (.699)	20–5 (.800)		
Centenary Ladies (Mid-Continent Conference/The Summit League) (2003–2010)
2003	Centenary	20–35			
2004	Centenary	36–28	16–8	2nd	NCAA Regional
2005	Centenary	31–28	11–9	3rd	NCAA Regional
2006	Centenary	31–25	13–9	2nd	
2007	Centenary	22–27	6–6	T–4th	
2008	Centenary	34–26	17–7	2nd	
2009	Centenary	32–23	13–9	3rd	
2010	Centenary	10–34	4–19	9th	
Centenary:		216–226 (.489)	80–67 (.544)		
Northern Colorado Bears (Pacific Coast Softball Conference) (2011–2012)
2011	Northern Colorado	17–35	13–7	2nd (Mountain)	
2012	Northern Colorado	25–28	10–10	T–2nd (Mountain)	
Northern Colorado:		42–63 (.400)	23–17 (.575)		
Louisiana Tech Lady Techsters (Western Athletic Conference) (2013)
2013	Louisiana Tech	27–26	11–10	3rd	
Louisiana Tech Lady Techsters (Conference USA) (2014–2019)
2014	Louisiana Tech	19–33	7–16	12th	
2015	Louisiana Tech	31–19	12–9	3rd (West)	
2016	Louisiana Tech	32–22	12–9	3rd (West)	
2017	Louisiana Tech	38–24	16–8	1st (West)	NCAA Regional
2018	Louisiana Tech	34–23	15–9	2nd (West)	
2019	Louisiana Tech	45–16	19–5	T–1st (West)	NCAA Regional
Louisiana Tech:		226–163 (.581)	92–66 (.582)		
Maryland Terrapins (Big Ten Conference) (2020–2023)
2020	Maryland	12–11	0–0		Season canceled due to COVID-19
2021	Maryland	19–25	19–25	T-10th	
2022	Maryland	29–23	14–8	T-4th	
2023	Maryland	38–19	11–11	T-7th	NISC Final Four
Maryland:		98–78 (.557)	44–44 (.500)		
Total:		654–561 (.538)			
National champion Postseason invitational champion Conference regular season champion Conference regular season and conference tournament champion Division regular season champion Division regular season and conference tournament champion Conference tournament champion
