= 2019 Western Athletic Conference softball tournament =

- Teams: 6
- Format: Double-elimination
- Finals site: GCU Softball Stadium; Phoenix, AZ
- Television: ESPN+

The 2019 Western Athletic Conference softball tournament was held at GCU Softball Stadium on the campus of Grand Canyon University in Phoenix, Arizona, from May 8 through May 11, 2019. All six eligible softball teams competed as part of the tournament. Cal Baptist was ineligible to participate as they were in year one of the four year reclassification process.

== Tournament ==
Upper round 1
4	Utah Valley	4
5	Kansas City	5
3	Grand Canyon	9
6	CSU Bakersfield	5
Lower round 1
6	CSU Bakersfield	3
5	Kansas City	2
4	Utah Valley	4
3	Grand Canyon	6

Upper round 2
1	Seattle U	5
5	Kansas City	4
2	New Mexico State	1
3	Grand Canyon	0
Lower round 2
6	CSU Bakersfield	4
3	Grand Canyon	6

Upper final
1	Seattle U	8
2	New Mexico State	7
Lower final
2	New Mexico State	6
3	Grand Canyon	4

Final
1	Seattle U	3
2	New Mexico State	2

== Schedule ==
Game	Time*	Matchup^{#}	Television	TV Announcers	Attendance
Wednesday, May 8
1	2:30 p.m.	#4 Utah Valley vs. #5 Kansas City	ESPN+	Michael Potter & Mary Kay Mauro	642
2	6:28 p.m.	#3 Grand Canyon vs. #6 CSU Bakersfield	ESPN+	Michael Potter & Mary Kay Mauro	642
Thursday, May 9
3	10:30 a.m.	#1 Seattle vs. #5 Kansas City	ESPN+	Michael Potter & Mary Kay Mauro	759
4	1:30 p.m.	#2 New Mexico State vs. #3 Grand Canyon	ESPN+	Michael Potter & Mary Kay Mauro	759
5	4:30 p.m.	#5 Kansas City vs. #6 CSU Bakersfield	ESPN+	Michael Potter & Mary Kay Mauro	759
6	7:30 p.m.	#3 Grand Canyon vs. #4 Utah Valley	ESPN+	Michael Potter & Mary Kay Mauro	759
Friday, May 10
7	1:30 p.m.	#1 Seattle vs. #2 New Mexico State	ESPN+	Michael Potter & Mary Kay Mauro	678
8	4:30 p.m.	#3 Grand Canyon vs. #6 CSU Bakersfield	ESPN+	Michael Potter & Mary Kay Mauro	678
9	7:30 p.m.	#2 New Mexico State vs. #3 Grand Canyon	ESPN+	Michael Potter & Mary Kay Mauro	678
Championship – Saturday, May 11
10	1:30 p.m.	#1 Seattle vs. #2 New Mexico State	ESPN+	Michael Potter & Mary Kay Mauro	412
11 (If Necessary)	4:00 p.m.	#1 Seattle vs. #2 New Mexico State	ESPN+	Michael Potter & Mary Kay Mauro	412
*Game times in Mountain Standard Time. # – Rankings denote tournament seed.
