= Renee Luers-Gillispie =

American softball coach

Biographical details
- Born: Livermore, California, U.S.

Playing career
- 1980-1981: Kirkwood Community College
- 1982–1983: West Texas A&M
- Position: Pitcher

Coaching career (HC unless noted)
- 1991–1992: Joliet Junior College
- 1993–1995: Bradley University
- 1996–1999: Texas Tech
- 2002–2018: UCF
- 2019–2025: Iowa

Head coaching record
- Overall: 880–667–2 (.569)

Accomplishments and honors

Championships
- C-USA Tournament Champions (2005, 2008); American Regular Season Champions (2014); NISC Champions (2023)

Awards
- N4C Coach of the Year (1992) Conference (AAC) Coach of the Year (2017) NCAA Regional Coaching Staff of the Year (2017)

Renee Luers-Gillispie is an American college softball coach and a former college player. Luers-Gillispie was the head coach of the Iowa Hawkeyes softball team of the University of Iowa.

== Playing career ==
Luers-Gillispie first attended Kirkwood Community College in Cedar Rapids, Iowa, where she played for the softball team in 1981. After her freshman year, she transferred to West Texas A&M in Canyon, Texas, where she was a three-year starter. As a player, she set nine career pitching records including most wins, most strikeouts and most saves at West Texas A&M.

In 2005, Luers-Gillispie was inducted into the West Texas A&M Athletics Hall of Fame.

== Coaching career ==
Luers-Gillispie began her coaching career at Joliet Junior College in 1991. She became the head coach at Bradley University in 1993, and was named to the same position at Texas Tech in 1996.

In 2000, Luers-Gillispie was hired by UCF to start the Knights softball program. The UCF softball team began play in 2002. The Knights played their first games on February 2, losing the first contest 2–3 to Bethune–Cookman, and winning their second game against Arkansas, 6–5. In 2005 and 2008, Luers-Gillispie led the Knights to conference tournament championships, and the program has appeared in the NCAA Tournament five times, in 2005, 2008, 2010, 2012, and 2014.

On December 17, 2024, Gillispie took a medical leave of absence from her head coaching duties at Iowa for the 2025 season. On April 29, 2025, Iowa announced that Gillispie would not return as head coach, she did not coach a game during the 2025 season.

== Personal life ==
Gillispie currently reside in Iowa City, Iowa.

== Head coaching record ==
=== College ===
Record table
Season	Team	Overall	Conference	Standing	Postseason
Texas Tech Red Raiders (Big 12 Conference) (1996–1999)
1996	Texas Tech	4–44	1–20	8th	
1997	Texas Tech	34–29–1	1–13	T-9th	
1998	Texas Tech	45–19	10–7	4th	
1999	Texas Tech	36–31	6–7	6th	NCAA Regional
Texas Tech:		119–123–1 (.492)	18–47 (.277)		
UCF Knights (Atlantic Sun Conference) (2002–2005)
2002	UCF	46–19	12–6	T-3rd	
2003	UCF	37–31	13–7	4th	
2004	UCF	42–21	16–4	2nd	
2005	UCF	47–29–1	13–7	T-3rd	NCAA Regionals
UCF Knights (Conference USA) (2006–2013)
2006	UCF	19–37	4–20	9th	
2007	UCF	38–26	11–13	T-4th	
2008	UCF	49–20	16–7	2nd	NCAA Regional
2009	UCF	27–27	11–12	5th	
2010	UCF	36–23	16–7	3rd	NCAA Regional
2011	UCF	22–32	11–13	5th	
2012	UCF	39–19	15–9	T-3rd	NCAA Regional
2013	UCF	29–25	10–14	6th	
UCF Knights (American Athletic Conference) (2014–2018)
2014	UCF	43–18	15–3	1st	NCAA Regional
2015	UCF	50–9	16–2	1st	NCAA Regional
2016	UCF	38–22	12–4	2nd	NCAA Regional
2017	UCF	29–23	11–7	3rd	
2018	UCF	34–22	12–9	T-3rd	
UCF:		625–403–1 (.608)	214–144 (.598)		
Iowa Hawkeyes (Big Ten Conference) (2019–2024)
2019	Iowa	19–32	5–18	12th	
2020	Iowa	17–5			Season canceled due to COVID-19 pandemic
2021	Iowa	26–18	26–18	4th	
2022	Iowa	21–31	3–20	14th	
2023	Iowa	35–27	10–13	9th	NISC Champions
2024	Iowa	18–28	6–17	14th	
Iowa:		136–141 (.491)	50–86 (.368)		
Total:		880–667–2 (.569)			
National champion Postseason invitational champion Conference regular season champion Conference regular season and conference tournament champion Division regular season champion Division regular season and conference tournament champion Conference tournament champion
