= Julie Wright =

American softball coach

Biographical details
- Education: Ohio

Playing career
- 1992–1995: Ohio

Coaching career (HC unless noted)
- 1996–1999: Ohio (asst.)
- 1999–2004: Kansas (asst.)
- 2005–2006: Akron
- 2007–2010: Wisconsin (asst.)
- 2011–2015: Idaho State
- 2016–2019: Maryland

Head coaching record
- Overall: 240–328–1 (.423)

Julie Wright is an American softball coach who is the former head coach of Maryland.

== Coaching career ==
=== Maryland ===
On July 17, 2015, an announcement was made that Julie Wright would be appointed as the new head coach of the Maryland softball program. Wright stepped down as head coach after 4 seasons.

== Head coaching record ==
=== College ===
Record table
Season	Team	Overall	Conference	Standing	Postseason
Akron Zips (Mid-American Conference) (2005–2006)
2005	Akron	27–27	10–13	5th (East)	
2006	Akron	26–25	13–9	3rd (East)	
Akron:		53–52 (.505)	23–22 (.511)		
Idaho State Bengals (Pacific Coast Softball Conference) (2011–2012)
2011	Idaho State	16–32	9–11		
2012	Idaho State	12–36			
Idaho State Bengals (Big Sky Conference) (2013–2015)
2013	Idaho State	29–23	14–4	1st	
2014	Idaho State	35–20	13–4	1st	
2015	Idaho State	34–18	17–4	1st	
Idaho State:		126–129 (.494)	53–23 (.697)		
Maryland Terrapins (Big Ten Conference) (2016–2019)
2016	Maryland	12–40	4–19	13th	
2017	Maryland	11–39–1	4–19	14th	
2018	Maryland	18–37	7–16	11th	
2019	Maryland	20–31	4–19	14th	
Maryland:		61–147–1 (.294)	19–73 (.207)		
Total:		240–328–1 (.423)			
National champion Postseason invitational champion Conference regular season champion Conference regular season and conference tournament champion Division regular season champion Division regular season and conference tournament champion Conference tournament champion
