= Maryland Terrapins softball =

- Founded: 1995
- University: University of Maryland, College Park
- Head coach: Lauren Karn (3rd season)
- Conference: Big Ten
- Location: College Park, Maryland, US
- Home stadium: Maryland Softball Stadium (capacity: 1000)
- Nickname: Terrapins
- Colors: Red, white, gold, and black

NCAA Tournament appearances
- 1999, 2010, 2011, 2012

The Maryland Terrapins softball is the that team represents University of Maryland, College Park in NCAA Division I college softball. The team currently participates in the Big Ten Conference. The Terrapins are currently led by their head coach Lauren Karn. The team plays home games at Maryland Softball Stadium which is located on the university's campus.

== History ==
=== Coaching history ===
Years	Coach	Record	%
1995–2005	Gina LaMandre	338–263–1	.562
2006–2014	Laura Watten	269–193	.582
2015	Courtney Deifel	27–27	.500
2016–2019	Julie Wright	61–147–1	.294
2020–2023	Mark Montgomery	98–78	.557
2024-present	Lauren Karn	0-0	.000

== Awards ==
Big Ten Freshman of the Year

- Jaeda McFarland, 2021
