= 2019 Alabama Crimson Tide softball team =

American college softball season

2019 Alabama Crimson Tide softball

SEC Regular Season Champions Tuscaloosa Regional Champions Tuscaloosa Super Regional Champions Women's College World Series Appearance
- Conference: Southeastern Conference
- West
- Record: 60–10 (18–6 SEC)
- Head coach: Patrick Murphy
- Assistant coach: Alyson Habetz
- Pitching coach: Stephanie VanBrakle
- Home stadium: Rhoads Stadium

2019 Southeastern Conference softball standings
	Conf.				Overall
Team	W		L	PCT	W		L	PCT
No. 5 Alabama ‍†‍‍^{y}	18	–	6	.750	60	–	10	.857
No. 11 Tennessee ‍‍‍^{y}	14	–	10	.583	43	–	17	.717
No. 10 LSU ‍‍‍^{y}	14	–	10	.583	43	–	19	.694
No. 23 Kentucky ‍‍‍^{y}	14	–	10	.583	36	–	24	.600
No. 17 Ole Miss ‍‍‍^{y}	13	–	10	.565	41	–	20	.672
No. 8 Florida ‍‍‡‍^{y}	12	–	12	.500	49	–	18	.731
No. 14 Georgia ‍‍‍^{y}	12	–	12	.500	42	–	19	.689
No. 20 Arkansas ‍‍‍^{y}	12	–	12	.500	38	–	20	.655
Missouri ‍‍‍^{y}	12	–	12	.500	35	–	25	.583
No. 24 Auburn ‍‍‍^{y}	10	–	14	.417	39	–	21	.650
No. 21 South Carolina ‍‍‍^{y}	9	–	14	.391	38	–	19	.667
Mississippi State ‍‍‍^{y}	9	–	15	.375	35	–	23	.603
Texas A&M ‍‍‍^{y}	6	–	18	.250	28	–	27	.509
† – Conference champion ‡ – Tournament champion y – Invited to the NCAA tournament As of June 5, 2019; Rankings from NFCA

The 2019 Alabama Crimson Tide softball team was an American softball team that represented the University of Alabama during the 2019 NCAA Division I softball season. The Crimson Tide played their home games at Rhoads Stadium. After losing in the 2018 NCAA Super Regionals, the 2019 team looked to make the postseason for the 21st straight year, and the Women's College World Series for twelfth time. This season represents the 23rd season of softball in the school's history.

== Personnel ==
=== Roster ===
2019 Alabama Crimson Tide roster
Pitchers: 14 Montana Fouts – Freshman; 20 Sarah Cornell – Junior; 21 Courtney Gettins – Senior; 24 Madison Preston – Sophomore; 42 Krystal Goodman – Junior; Outfielders: 1 Elissa Brown – Junior; 6 Kloyee Anderson – Freshman; 7 Merris Schroder – Senior; 8 KB Sides – Sophomore; 10 Kayla Davis – Freshman; 12 Kaylee Tow – Sophomore	Catchers: 54 Reagan Dykes – Senior; Infielders: 00 Maddie Morgan – Sophomore; 2 Skylar Wallace – Freshman; 5 Kyra Lockhart – Sophomore; 9 Taylor Clark – Junior; 33 Claire Jenkins – Junior; Utility: 16 Bailey Hemphill – Junior; 34 Caroline Hardy – Senior

2019 Alabama Crimson Tide Softball Roster

=== Coaching staff ===
2019 Alabama Crimson Tide softball coaching staff
- Patrick Murphy – Head coach – 21st year
- Alyson Habetz – Associate head coach, hitting coach – 21st year
- Stephanie VanBrakle Prothro – Assistant coach, pitching coach – 8th year
- Brynne Dordel – Volunteer assistant coach – 2nd year
- Kate Harris – Director of operations- 9th year

== Schedule ==
Date	Time	Opponent	Rank^{#}	Site	Result	Attendance	Winning Pitcher	Losing Pitcher
Trojan Classic
February 8*	12:30 PM	Murray State	#9	Troy Softball Complex • Troy, AL	W 12–0^{(5)}	671	K. Goodman	H. James
February 8*	5:30 PM	Troy	#9	Troy Softball Complex • Troy, AL	W 7–1	1,837	M. Fouts	A. Willis
February 9*	10:00 AM	Maryland	#9	Troy Softball Complex • Troy, AL	W 10–0^{(5)}	432	S. Cornell	S. Golden
February 9*	12:30 PM	Murray State	#9	Troy Softball Complex • Troy, AL	W 16–10	663	K. Goodman	M. Van Duyse
February 10*	12:30 PM	Troy	#9	Troy Softball Complex • Troy, AL	W 8–0^{(6)}	1,852	M. Fouts	L. Johnson
Hillenbrand Invitational
February 15*	12:15 PM	South Florida	#7	Hillenbrand Stadium • Tucson, AZ	W 2–0	–	M. Fouts	N. Doyle
February 15*	2:30 PM	New Mexico	#7	Hillenbrand Stadium • Tucson, AZ	W 1–0	–	S. Cornell	A. Spencer
February 16*	2:30 PM	Cal St. Fullerton	#7	Hillenbrand Stadium • Tucson, AZ	W 7–2	–	S. Cornell	S. Frost
February 16*	4:45 PM	#9 Arizona	#7	Hillenbrand Stadium • Tucson, AZ	W 6–1	2,968	M. Fouts	A. McQuillin
February 17*	12:15 PM	UIC	#7	Hillenbrand Stadium • Tucson, AZ	W 13–4^{(6)}	–	C. Gettins	A. Trudeau
Easton Bama Bash
February 22*	3:30 PM	Missouri St.	#6	Rhoads Stadium • Tuscaloosa, AL	W 11–1^{(5)}	–	S. Cornell	S. Dickerson
February 22*	6:00 PM	#24 Minnesota	#6	Rhoads Stadium • Tuscaloosa, AL	W 1–0	2,248	M. Fouts	A. Fiser
February 24*	4:00 PM	Missouri St.	#6	Rhoads Stadium • Tuscaloosa, AL	W 7–5	–	K. Goodman	E. Griesbauer
February 23*	3:00 PM	#24 Minnesota	#6	Rhoads Stadium • Tuscaloosa, AL	W 7–2^{(5)}	2,448	M. Fouts	A. Fiser
February 24*	2:00 PM	Louisiana–Monroe	#6	Rhoads Stadium • Tuscaloosa, AL	W 5–1	2,506	C. Gettins	K. Taranto
February 27*	6:00 PM	UAB	#6	Mary Bowers Field • Birmingham, AL	W 8–0^{(6)}	824	S. Cornell	C. Blount
Easton Crimson Classic
March 1*	4:00 PM	Michigan St.	#6	Rhoads Stadium • Tuscaloosa, AL	W 2–1	–	M. Fouts	J. Watson
March 1*	6:00 PM	Southern Miss	#6	Rhoads Stadium • Tuscaloosa, AL	W 3–2	2,484	S. Cornell	K. Ladner
March 2*	1:30 PM	Saint Francis	#6	Rhoads Stadium • Tuscaloosa, AL	W 3–1	–	S. Cornell	M. Bower
March 2*	4:00 PM	Southern Miss	#6	Rhoads Stadium • Tuscaloosa, AL	W 3–1	–	M. Fouts	A. Trahan
March 3*	1:30 PM	Michigan St.	#6	Rhoads Stadium • Tuscaloosa, AL	Canceled			
March 5*	5:00 PM	South Alabama	#5	Rhoads Stadium • Tuscaloosa, AL	W 5–2	2,167	S. Cornell	A. Reid
March 6*	6:00 PM	Mississippi Valley	#5	Rhoads Stadium • Tuscaloosa, AL	W 7–0	1,989	K. Goodman	A. Montes
March 8	4:30 PM	Missouri	#5	Rhoads Stadium • Tuscaloosa, AL	W 3–1	–	M. Fouts	M. Norman
March 8	6:00 PM	Missouri	#5	Rhoads Stadium • Tuscaloosa, AL	W 14–6	2,583	S. Cornell	B. Koester
March 10	2:00 PM	Missouri	#5	Rhoads Stadium • Tuscaloosa, AL	W 11–5	2,575	M. Fouts	M. Norman
Rainbow Wahine Classic
March 13*	6:00 PM	SIUE	#4	Rainbow Wahine Stadium • Honolulu, HI	W 6–4	–	S. Cornell	C. Rivas
March 14*	6:00 PM	Niagara	#4	Rainbow Wahine Stadium • Honolulu, HI	W 9–3	–	K. Goodman	K. Cotton
March 14*	8:30 PM	SIUE	#4	Rainbow Wahine Stadium • Honolulu, HI	W 8–3	–	C. Gettins	E. Ingles
March 15*	8:30 PM	Niagara	#4	Rainbow Wahine Stadium • Honolulu, HI	W 12–2^{(5)}	–	C. Gettins	S. Bertrand
March 15*	11:00 PM	Hawaii	#4	Rainbow Wahine Stadium • Honolulu, HI	W 9–0^{(5)}	945	M. Fouts	I. Dino
March 16*	7:00 PM	Hawaii	#4	Rainbow Wahine Stadium • Honolulu, HI	W 6–2	760	S. Cornell	B. Hitchcock
March 22	6:00 PM	Texas A&M	#4	Davis Diamond • College Station, TX	W 13–3^{(6)}	1,513	M. Fouts	K. Poynter
March 23	2:00 PM	Texas A&M	#4	Davis Diamond • College Station, TX	W 11–1^{(5)}	2,178	S. Cornell	K. Potts
March 24	1:00 PM	Texas A&M	#4	Davis Diamond • College Station, TX	L 3–4	1,558	K. Potts	M. Fouts
March 27*	6:30 PM	Georgia Tech	#4	Rhoads Stadium • Tuscaloosa, AL	W 4–3	2,792	S. Cornell	M. Bruce
March 29	6:30 PM	Mississippi St.	#4	Rhoads Stadium • Tuscaloosa, AL	W 3–2^{(8)}	3,594	S. Cornell	E. Williams
March 30	2:00 PM	Mississippi St.	#4	Rhoads Stadium • Tuscaloosa, AL	W 8–2	3,940	C. Gettins	K. Boseman
March 31	1:30 PM	Mississippi St.	#4	Rhoads Stadium • Tuscaloosa, AL	L 9–12^{(10)}	3,624	E. Williams	C. Gettins
April 3*	6:00 PM	UAB	#4	Rhoads Stadium • Tuscaloosa, AL	W 17–1^{(5)}	2,382	K. Goodman	C. Blount
April 5	5:00 PM	#17 South Carolina	#4	Beckham Field • Columbia, SC	W 9–1	1,729	S. Cornell	C. Drotar
April 6	5:00 PM	#17 South Carolina	#4	Beckham Field • Columbia, SC	L 1–5	2,156	D. Raley	C. Gettins
April 7	12:00 PM	#17 South Carolina	#4	Beckham Field • Columbia, SC	L 0–2	1,884	D. Raley	S. Cornell
April 10*	6:00 PM	#13 Georgia St.	#5	Rhoads Stadium • Tuscaloosa, AL	W 5–1	2,298	K. Goodman	M. Parson
April 13	11:00 AM	#13 Georgia	#5	Rhoads Stadium • Tuscaloosa, AL	W 7–1	3,716	S. Cornell	M. Avant
April 14	6:00 PM	#13 Georgia	#5	Rhoads Stadium • Tuscaloosa, AL	W 4–0	2,825	K. Goodman	A. Cutting
April 15	6:00 PM	#13 Georgia	#5	Rhoads Stadium • Tuscaloosa, AL	W 4–3	2,536	S. Cornell	K. Bass
April 19	4:30 PM	#6 Florida	#5	Pressly Stadium • Gainesville, FL	W 3–1	2,063	M. Fouts	K. Barnhill
April 19	6:30 PM	#6 Florida	#5	Pressly Stadium • Gainesville, FL	W 6–1	–	S. Cornell	E. Hightower
April 20	1:00 PM	#6 Florida	#5	Pressly Stadium • Gainesville, FL	W 3–0	2,138	K. Goodman	K. Barnhill
April 23*	6:00 PM	Belmont	#3	Heritage Park • Cullman, AL	W 6–4	1,100	C. Gettins	B. Lee
April 26	6:30 PM	#23 Kentucky	#3	Rhoads Stadium • Tuscaloosa, AL	L 1–4	3,104	G. Baalman	M. Fouts
April 27	5:30 PM	#23 Kentucky	#3	Rhoads Stadium • Tuscaloosa, AL	W 3–1	3,742	S. Cornell	A. Humes
April 28	2:00 PM	#23 Kentucky	#3	Rhoads Stadium • Tuscaloosa, AL	L 2–3^{(13)}	3,940	A. Humes	M. Fouts
May 3	6:00 PM	#7 LSU	#4	Tiger Park • Baton Rouge, LA	W 7–0	2,495	M. Fouts	S. Sunseri
May 4	5:00 PM	#7 LSU	#4	Tiger Park • Baton Rouge, LA	W 4–3	2,652	S. Cornell	M. Gorsuch
May 5	1:00 PM	#7 LSU	#4	Tiger Park • Baton Rouge, LA	W 5–1	2,604	K. Goodman	S. Sunseri
SEC softball tournament
May 9	8:00 PM	#13 Georgia	#4	Davis Diamond • College Station, TX	W 2–1^{(8)}	1,421	M. Fouts	K. Bass
May 10	6:00 PM	#23 Kentucky	#4	Davis Diamond • College Station, TX	W 6–3	1,558	S. Cornell	M. Schorman
May 11	7:00 PM	#9 Florida	#4	Davis Diamond • College Station, TX	L 1–2	2,233	K. Barnhill	M. Fouts
NCAA Tuscaloosa Regional
May 17	5:30 PM	Alabama State	#5	Rhoads Stadium • Tuscaloosa, AL	W 8–2	2,630	K. Goodman	J. Jean
May 18	1:00 PM	Arizona State	#5	Rhoads Stadium • Tuscaloosa, AL	W 7–4	2,630	M. Fouts	C. Meza
May 19	1:00 PM	Arizona State	#5	Rhoads Stadium • Tuscaloosa, AL	W 9–8	2,508	M. Fouts	S. Mejia
NCAA Tuscaloosa Super Regional
May 23	8:00 PM	#9 Texas	#5	Rhoads Stadium • Tuscaloosa, AL	W 3-0	2,887	M.Fouts	M. Elish
May 24	8:00 PM	#9 Texas	#5	Rhoads Stadium • Tuscaloosa, AL	L 5-7	3,379	S. O'Leary	M. Fouts
May 25	1:00 PM	#9 Texas	#5	Rhoads Stadium • Tuscaloosa, AL	W 8-5	2,543	M. Fouts	S. O'Leary
Women's College World Series
May 30	8:30 PM	#1 Oklahoma	#5	ASA Hall of Fame Stadium • Oklahoma City, OK	L 2-3	9,290	G. Juarez	M. Fouts
June 1	1:30 PM	#8 Florida	#5	ASA Hall of Fame Stadium • Oklahoma City, OK	W 15–3^{(5)}		S. Cornell	K. Barnhill
June 1	10:30 PM	#6 Arizona	#5	ASA Hall of Fame Stadium • Oklahoma City, OK	W 2-0	8,971	M. Fouts	A. Denham
June 2	2:30 PM	#1 Oklahoma	#5	ASA Hall of Fame Stadium • Oklahoma City, OK	W 1–0^{(8)}	9,046	M. Fouts	G. Juarez
June 2	7:35 PM	#1 Oklahoma	#5	ASA Hall of Fame Stadium • Oklahoma City, OK	L 3-7	7,242	M. Lopez	K. Goodman
*Non-Conference Game. ^{#}Rankings from NFCA released prior to game.All times are in Central Time Zone.

== Honors and awards ==
- Bailey Hemphill and Kaylee Tow were selected to the Preseason All-SEC Team.
- Kaylee Tow was named the SEC Player of the Week, February 11.
- Montana Fouts was named the SEC Freshman of the Week, February 18.
- Montana Fouts was named the SEC Freshman of the Week, February 25.
- Montana Fouts was named the SEC Freshman of the Week, March 12.
- Sarah Cornell was named the SEC Pitcher of the Week, April 16.
- Montana Fouts was named the SEC Pitcher of the Week, April 23.
- Sarah Cornell, Montana Fouts, and Bailey Hemphill were named First Team All-SEC.
- Maddie Morgan, and Elissa Brown were named Second Team All-SEC.
- Montana Fouts, and Skyler Wallace were named Freshman All-SEC.
- Sarah Cornell, and Elissa Brown were named SEC All-Defense.
- Sarah Cornell was named SEC Pitcher of the Year.
- Montana Fouts was named SEC Freshman of the Year.
- Patrick Murphy was named SEC Coach of the Year.

== Ranking movement ==
Poll	Pre	Wk 1	Wk 2	Wk 3	Wk 4	Wk 5	Wk 6	Wk 7	Wk 8	Wk 9	Wk 10	Wk 11	Wk 12	Wk 13	Wk 14	Final
NFCA	9	7	6	6	5	4	4	4	4	5	5	3	4	4	5	
USA Softball	11	8	6	5	5	4	3	4	4	7	7	3	5			

== See also ==
- 2019 Alabama Crimson Tide baseball team
