= 2019 North Dakota State Bison softball team =

2019 North Dakota State SB Team

2019 North Dakota State Bison softball

Summit League Regular Season Champion Summit League Tournament Champion
- Conference: Summit League
- Record: 42-16 (16-2 Summit League)
- Head coach: Darren Mueller (18th season)
- Home stadium: Tharaldson Park

2019 Summit League softball standings
	Conf.				Overall
Team	W		L	PCT	W		L	PCT
North Dakota State ‍†‍‡‍^{y}	16	–	2	.889	42	–	16	.724
South Dakota ‍‍‍	12	–	6	.667	33	–	28	.541
Western Illinois ‍‍‍	12	–	6	.667	20	–	20	.500
South Dakota State ‍‍‍	11	–	7	.611	37	–	19	.661
North Dakota ‍‍‍	7	–	11	.389	22	–	34	.393
Purdue Fort Wayne ‍‍‍	3	–	15	.167	10	–	39	.204
Omaha ‍‍‍	2	–	16	.111	4	–	43	.085
† – Conference champion ‡ – Tournament champion y – Invited to the NCAA tournament As of June 14, 2019; Rankings from NFCA

The 2019 North Dakota State Bison softball team was an American college softball team that represented North Dakota State University during the 2019 NCAA Division I softball season. The Bison were led by Darren Mueller in his 18th season, and played their home games at Tharaldson Park. They competed in the Summit League, where they finished the season with a 42–16 record, also finishing 16–2 in conference play.

The Bison won the Summit League Tournament, and qualified for the 2019 NCAA Division I softball tournament. NDSU lost both games in the Minneapolis Regional, first to 12th ranked Minnesota and second to 25th ranked Drake.

== Personnel ==
=== Roster ===
2019 North Dakota State Bison Roster
Pitchers: 5 – KK Leddy – senior; 9 – Paige Vargas – freshman; 10 – Kara O'Byrne – sophomore; 27 – Morgan Olson – sophomore; Catchers: 7 – Avery Wysong – freshman; 26 – Maddie Hansen – senior; Outfielders: 2 – Madyson Camacho – junior; 12 – Stephanie Soriano – junior; 21 – Katie Shoultz – senior	Infielders: 3 – Julia Luciano – senior; 15 – Nicole Licea – freshman; 17 – Vanessa Anderson – senior; 18 – Zoe Stavrou – senior; 19 – Montana Decamp – junior; 33 – Cameryn Maykut – freshman; 37 – Sam Koehn – sophomore; Utility/Designated; Player: 4 – Cara Beatty – sophomore; 6 – Lauren Reimers – junior

=== Coaching staff ===
2019 North Dakota State Coaching Staff
Name	Position
Darren Mueller	Head coach
Gerice Olson	Assistant coach
Melissa Chmielewski	Assistant coach

== Schedule ==
2019 North Dakota State Bison softball game log
Regular season (38-13)

February (7-6)
Date	Opponent	Rank	Site/stadium	Score	Win	Loss	Save	Attendance	Overall Record	Summit League Record
February 9	UTSA		Bobcats Softball Stadium; San Marcos, TX	6-2	**Leddy (1-0)**	Nelson (0-1)	None	641	1-0	-
February 10	Abilene Christian		Bobcats Softball Stadium	6-5	**Leddy (2-0)**	Bradley (0-1)	None	587	2-0	-
February 10	at Texas State		Bobcats Softball Stadium	1-9^{(5)}	Barrera (0-1)	**Leddy (2-1)**	None	587	2-1	-
February 11	at Texas State		Bobcats Softball Stadium	4-3^{(10)}	**Vargas (1-0)**	King (0-1)	None	364	3-1	-
February 14	Northern Colorado		Puerto Vallarta, Mexico	4-0	**Leddy (3-1)**	Vidal (0-1)	None	75	4-1	-
February 14	#12 Arkansas		Puerto Vallarta, Mexico	6-7	Storms (1-0)	**Vargas (1-1)**	None	263	4-2	-
February 15	#5 Washington		Puerto Vallarta, Mexico	3-5	Plain (1-0)	**Leddy (3-2)**	None	150	4-3	-
February 16	Southern Illinois		Puerto Vallarta, Mexico	9-10	Jones (1-0)	**Leddy (3-3)**	None	150	4-4	-
February 22	at #22 Auburn		Jane B. Moore Field; Auburn, AL	1-4	Martin (1-0)	**Vargas (1-2)**	None	1779	4-5	-
February 22	Troy		Jane B. Moore Field	3-2^{(9)}	**Leddy (4-3)**	Willis (0-1)	None	1779	5-5	-
February 23	at #22 Auburn		Jane B. Moore Field	2-10^{(5)}	Handley (0-1)	**Leddy (4-4)**	None	2098	5-6	-
February 23	Villanova		Jane B. Moore Field	6-1	**Leddy (5-4)**	Amarillas (0-1)	None	69	6-6	-
February 24	Eastern Illinois		Jane B. Moore Field	9-6	**Vargas (2-2)**	Montgomery (0-1)	None	111	7-6	-

March (17-5)
Date	Opponent	Rank	Site/stadium	Score	Win	Loss	Save	Attendance	Overall Record	Summit League Record
March 1	Cal Poly		Boyd & Jill Smith Family Stadium; Stanford, CA	8-0	**Leddy (6-4)**	Best (0-1)	None	338	8-6	-
March 1	Montana		Boyd & Jill Smith Family Stadium	5-2	**Vargas (3-2)**	Driscoll (0-1)	Leddy (1)	338	9-6	-
March 2	Northwestern		Boyd & Jill Smith Family Stadium	0-7	Wilkey (1-0)	**Leddy (6-5)**	None	334	9-7	-
March 2	at Stanford		Boyd & Jill Smith Family Stadium	Canceled					9-7	-
March 3	at Stanford		Boyd & Jill Smith Family Stadium	2-3	Pancino (1-0)	**Vargas (3-3)**	None	497	9-8	-
March 8	Illinois State		Felsbgerg Field; Miami, FL	4-0	**Vargas (4-3)**	Day (0-1)	None	42	10-8	-
March 8	at FIU		Felsbgerg Field	1-2	Kugelmann (1-0)	**Leddy (6-6)**	Muraskin (1)	103	10-9	-
March 9	Notre Dame		FAU Softball Stadium; Boca Raton, FL	2-3	Tidd (1-0)	**O'Byrne (0-1)**	Holloway (1)	583	10-10	-
March 9	Purdue		FAU Softball Stadium	1-4	Bates (1-0)	**Vargas (4-4)**	Echazarreta (1)	64	10-11	-
March 10	Stony Brook		FAU Softball Stadium	7-0	**Leddy (7-6)**	Pechin (0-1)	None	59	11-11	-
March 13	Butler		EddieCMoore Complex; Clearwater, FL	3-2	**Vargas (5-4)**	Graves (0-1)	None	103	12-11	-
March 14	Eastern Illinois		EddieCMoore Complex	7-5	**Leddy (8-6)**	Coffman (0-1)	None	167	13-11	-
March 15	Towson		EddieCMoore Complex	1-0	**O'Byrne (1-1)**	Johnson (0-1)	**Leddy (2)**	85	14-11	-
March 15	Wichita State		EddieCMoore Complex	6-4	**Vargas (6-4)**	Mcdonald (0-1)	None	50	15-11	-
March 16	Purdue		EddieCMoore Complex	3-0	**Leddy (9-6)**	Moody (0-1)	None	116	16-11	-
March 16	Chattanooga		EddieCMoore Complex	5-1	**O'Byrne (2-1)**	Hudson (0-1)	None	53	17-11	-
March 17	Florida Gulf Coast		EddieCMoore Complex	3-2	**Vargas (7-4)**	White (0-1)	None	123	18-11	-
March 23	at Purdue Fort Wayne		Fort Wayne, IN	11-1	**Leddy (10-6)**	Eyre (0-1)	None	127	19-11	1-0
March 23	at Purdue Fort Wayne		Fort Wayne, IN	5-0	**Vargas (8-4)**	Malicki (0-1)	None	127	20-11	2-0
March 24	at Purdue Fort Wayne		Fort Wayne, IN	7-0	**Leddy (11-6)**	McConnell (0-1)	None	131	21-11	3-0
March 30	at Western Illinois		Mary Ellen McKee Softball Stadium; Macomb, IL	12-0^{(5)}	**Leddy (12-6)**	Ira (0-1)	None	112	22-11	4-0
March 31	at Western Illinois		Mary Ellen McKee Softball Stadium	10-7	**Vargas (9-4)**	Rodriguez (0-1)	**Leddy (3)**	91	23-11	5-0
March 31	at Western Illinois		Mary Ellen McKee Softball Stadium	5-4	**Leddy (13-6)**	Carlin (0-1)	None	130	24-11	6-0

April (12-1)
Date	Opponent	Rank	Site/stadium	Score	Win	Loss	Save	Attendance	Overall Record	Summit League Record
April 5	at Seattle		Logan Field at SU Park; Seattle, WA	8-1	**Leddy (14-6)**	Nance (0-1)	None	96	25-11	-
April 5	at Seattle		Logan Field at SU Park	9-7	**Vargas (10-4)**	Larkins (0-1)	**O'Byrne (1)**	112	26-11	-
April 6	Santa Clara		Logan Field at SU Park	9-1^{(5)}	**Leddy (15-6)**	Kim (0-1)	None	93	27-11	-
April 7	Portland State		Logan Field at SU Park	2-1	**O'Byrne (3-1)**	Parrish (0-1)	**Vargas (1)**	92	28-11	-
April 14	South Dakota State		Tharaldson Park; Fargo, ND	5-0	**Leddy (16-6)**	Conard (0-1)	None	306	29-11	7-0
April 14	South Dakota State		Tharaldson Park	1-0	**Vargas (11-4)**	DeMarais (0-1)	None	306	30-11	8-0
April 15	South Dakota State		Tharaldson Park	2-6	Conard (1-0)	**Leddy (16-7)**	None	50	30-12	8-1
April 19	at South Dakota		Nygaard Field; Vermillion, SD	2-0^{(8)}	**Leddy (17-7)**	Devers (0-1)	None		31-12	9-1
April 19	at South Dakota		Nygaard Field	10-0^{(5)}	**Vargas (12-4)**	Durham (0-1)	None	150	32-12	10-1
April 20	at South Dakota		Nygaard Field	7-0	**Leddy (18-7)**	Devers (0-1)	None	200	33-12	11-1
April 24	at Minnesota		Minneapolis, MN	Canceled					33-12	-
April 24	at Minnesota		Minneapolis, MN	Canceled					33-12	-
April 26	Omaha		Tharaldson Park	8-1	**Leddy (19-7)**	Millington (0-1)	None	121	34-12	12-1
April 26	Omaha		Tharaldson Park	11-0^{(5)}	**Vargas (13-4)**	Jones (0-1)	None	121	35-12	13-1
April 27	Omaha		Tharaldson Park	15-0^{(5)}	**Leddy (20-7)**	Millington (0-1)	None	204	36-12	14-1

May (2-1)
Date	Opponent	Rank	Site/stadium	Score	Win	Loss	Save	Attendance	Overall Record	Summit League Record
May 4	North Dakota		Tharaldson Park	3-0	**Leddy (21-7)**	Jones (0-1)	None	453	37-12	15-1
May 4	North Dakota		Tharaldson Park	14-0^{(5)}	**Vargas (14-4)**	Pica (0-1)	None	453	38-12	16-1
May 5	North Dakota		Tharaldson Park	4-6	Rosas (1-0)	**O'Byrne (2-2)**	Jones (1)	348	38-13	16-2

Postseason (4-3)

Summit League Tournament (4-1)
Date	Opponent	Rank	Site/stadium	Score	Win	Loss	Save	Attendance	Overall Record	Summit LeagueT Record
May 10	(4) South Dakota State	(1)	Tharaldson Park; Fargo, ND	6-3	**Leddy (22-7)**	Conard (0-1)	None	311	39-13	1-0
May 10	(2) South Dakota	(1)	Tharaldson Park	1-10^{(5)}	Devers (1-0)	**Leddy (23-8)**	None	336	39-14	1-1
May 10	(4) South Dakota State	(1)	Tharaldson Park	5-0	**Vargas (15-4)**	Conard (0-1)	None	336	40-14	2-1
May 11	(2) South Dakota	(1)	Tharaldson Park	6-0	**Vargas (16-4)**	Devers (0-1)	None	341	41-14	3-1
May 11	(2) South Dakota	(1)	Tharaldson Park	3-1	**Vargas (17-4)**	Durham (0-1)	None	341	42-14	4-1

Minneapolis Regional (0-2)
Date	Opponent	Rank	Site/stadium	Score	Win	Loss	Save	Attendance	Overall Record	Minneapolis Regional Record
May 17	at (7) #12 Minnesota		Jane Sage Cowles Stadium; Minneapolis, MN	0-3	Fiser (1-0)	**Leddy (23-9)**	None	1158	42-15	0-1
May 18	#25 Drake		Jane Sage Cowles Stadium	0-8^{(5)}	Newman (1-0)	**Vargas (17-5)**	None	994	42-16	0-2

- Win
- Loss
- Postponement/Canceled
- Bold: Bison team member
- Rankings from NFCA
- (#) Tournament seedings in parentheses.
