= 2019 Sun Belt Conference softball tournament =

- Teams: 8
- Format: Double-elimination
- Finals site: Bobcat Softball Complex; San Marcos, Texas
- Champions: Louisiana (15 title)
- Winning coach: Gerry Glasco (1 title)
- MVP: Alyssa Dalton ((Louisiana))
- Television: ESPN+

2019 Sun Belt Conference softball standings
| | Conf. | | | | Overall |
| Team | W | | L | PCT | W | | L | PCT |
|---|---|---|---|---|---|---|---|---|
| No. 17 Louisiana ‍†‍‡‍^{y} | 25 | – | 0 | 1.000 | 52 | – | 6 | .897 |
| Troy ‍‍‍ | 19 | – | 8 | .704 | 37 | – | 20 | .649 |
| UT Arlington ‍‍‍ | 17 | – | 10 | .630 | 36 | – | 27 | .571 |
| Texas State ‍‍‍ | 16 | – | 10 | .615 | 29 | – | 25 | .537 |
| Appalachian State ‍‍‍ | 13 | – | 13 | .500 | 31 | – | 25 | .554 |
| Coastal Carolina ‍‍‍ | 13 | – | 14 | .481 | 39 | – | 21 | .650 |
| Georgia Southern ‍‍‍ | 9 | – | 17 | .346 | 23 | – | 28 | .451 |
| Louisiana–Monroe ‍‍‍ | 7 | – | 17 | .292 | 14 | – | 42 | .250 |
| South Alabama ‍‍‍ | 7 | – | 20 | .259 | 18 | – | 31 | .367 |
| Georgia State ‍‍‍ | 5 | – | 22 | .185 | 8 | – | 46 | .148 |
† – Conference champion ‡ – Tournament champion y – Invited to the NCAA tournament As of June 14, 2019; Rankings from NFCA

The 2019 Sun Belt Conference softball tournament was held at the Bobcat Softball Complex on the campus of the Texas State University in San Marcos, Texas, from May 8 to May 11, 2019. The tournament used a double-elimination format for the tournament as in past years. Louisiana, the winner of the tournament, earned the Sun Belt Conference's automatic bid to the 2019 NCAA Division I softball tournament.

== Seeding ==
In a change from previous years, the top eight teams (based on conference results) from the conference earned invites to the tournament. The teams were seeded based on conference winning percentage, with the bottom four seeds competing in a play-in round. The remaining four teams then played a two bracket, double-elimination tournament. The winner of each bracket played each other in the championship final.

== Results ==
=== Play-in round ===
Wednesday, May 8
| Team | R |
|---|---|
| #7 Georgia Southern | 1 |
| #6 Coastal Carolina | 2 |
Notes: GASO Eliminated

Wednesday, May 8
| Team | R |
|---|---|
| #8 Louisiana-Monroe | 2 |
| #5 Appalachian State | 0 |
Notes: APST Eliminated

== Tournament ==
Upper round 1
6 | Coastal Carolina | 5
3 | UT Arlington | 4
8 | Louisiana-Monroe | 0
4 | Texas State | 4
Lower round 1
8 | Louisiana-Monroe | 3^{10}
2 | Troy | 0
3 | UT Arlington | 8^{6}
4 | Texas State | 0

Upper round 2
2 | Troy | 2
6 | Coastal Carolina | 4
1 | Louisiana | 4
4 | Texas State | 3
Lower round 2
8 | Louisiana-Monroe | 5
3 | UT-Arlington | 2

Upper final
6 | Coastal Carolina | 2
1 | Louisiana | 5
Lower final
6 | Coastal Carolina | 4^{9}
8 | Louisiana-Monroe | 2

Final
1 | Louisiana | 1
6 | Coastal Carolina | 0

== Notes ==
- Louisiana's championship victory is their 15th Sun Belt Conference Tournament Championships, their 1st with Glasco as head coach, and marks their 12th 50-win season
