= 2019 Ole Miss Rebels softball team =

American college softball season

2019 Ole Miss Rebels softball

Oxford Regional champion

Tucson Super Regional, 0–2 vs. Arizona
- Conference: Southeastern Conference

Ranking
- Coaches: No. 17
- Record: 41–20 (13–10 SEC)
- Head coach: Mike Smith (5th season)
- Assistant coaches: Ruben Felix; Ashley Chastain
- Home stadium: Ole Miss Softball Complex

2019 Southeastern Conference softball standings
	Conf.				Overall
Team	W		L	PCT	W		L	PCT
No. 5 Alabama ‍†‍‍^{y}	18	–	6	.750	60	–	10	.857
No. 11 Tennessee ‍‍‍^{y}	14	–	10	.583	43	–	17	.717
No. 10 LSU ‍‍‍^{y}	14	–	10	.583	43	–	19	.694
No. 23 Kentucky ‍‍‍^{y}	14	–	10	.583	36	–	24	.600
No. 17 Ole Miss ‍‍‍^{y}	13	–	10	.565	41	–	20	.672
No. 8 Florida ‍‍‡‍^{y}	12	–	12	.500	49	–	18	.731
No. 14 Georgia ‍‍‍^{y}	12	–	12	.500	42	–	19	.689
No. 20 Arkansas ‍‍‍^{y}	12	–	12	.500	38	–	20	.655
Missouri ‍‍‍^{y}	12	–	12	.500	35	–	25	.583
No. 24 Auburn ‍‍‍^{y}	10	–	14	.417	39	–	21	.650
No. 21 South Carolina ‍‍‍^{y}	9	–	14	.391	38	–	19	.667
Mississippi State ‍‍‍^{y}	9	–	15	.375	35	–	23	.603
Texas A&M ‍‍‍^{y}	6	–	18	.250	28	–	27	.509
† – Conference champion ‡ – Tournament champion y – Invited to the NCAA tournament As of June 5, 2019; Rankings from NFCA

The 2019 Ole Miss Rebels softball team represented the University of Mississippi in the 2019 NCAA Division I softball season. The Rebels played their home games at the Ole Miss Softball Complex.

== Previous season ==
The Rebels finished the 2018 season 32–25 overall, and 7–17 in the conference. The Rebels entered the 2018 NCAA Division I softball tournament as the #2 seed in the Arizona State regional. The Rebels were defeated by the Sun Devils in the Regional Finals.

== Roster ==
2019 Ole Miss Rebels roster
Pitchers: 5 Ava Tillmann – Sophomore; 7 Molly Jacobsen – Junior; 18 Brittany Finney – Senior; 22 Anna Borgen – Sophomore; 35 Savannah Diederich – Freshman	Catchers: 19 Izzy Werdann – Senior; 24 Autumn Gillespie – Junior; Infielders: 6 Mikayla Allee – Freshman; 14 Taylor Watford – Freshman; 17 Kacey Hvitved – Sophomore; 21 Amanda Roth – Sophomore; 30 Abbey Latham – Sophomore; 36 Gabby Alvarez – Sophomore	Outfielders: 3 Alyssa Pinto – Freshman; 10 Katelin Cooper – Freshman; 11 Tate Whitley – Freshman; 15 Kylan Becker – Senior; 32 Kelsha Loftin – Junior; Utility: 1 Kaylee Horton – Junior; 16 Sydney Gutierrez – Sophomore; 20 Jessica Puk – Sophomore; 23 Ally Mena – Sophomore

== Schedule and results ==
Legend
	Ole Miss win
	Ole Miss loss
	Cancellation
**Bold**	Ole Miss team member

2019 Ole Miss Rebels Softball Game Log
Regular season (36–16)

February (9–6)
Date	Opponent	Rank	Site/stadium	Score	Win	Loss	Save	TV	Attendance	Overall record	SEC record
Feb. 7	at UCF; Friends of Jaclyn Tournament		UCF Softball Complex; Orlando, FL	**W** 3–0	**Brittany Finney (1–0)**	White (0–1)				1–0	
Feb. 8	vs. Ohio State; Friends of Jaclyn Tournament		UCF Softball Complex	**L** 2–4	Ray (1–0)	**Ava Tillmann (0–1)**				1–1	
Feb. 9	vs. No. 21 Minnesota; Friends of Jaclyn Tournament		UCF Softball Complex	**W** 3–1	**Molly Jacobsen (1–0)**	Fiser (1–1)				2–1	
Feb. 9	vs. George Mason; Friends of Jaclyn Tournament		UCF Softball Complex	**W** 8–0^{5}	**Anna Borgen (1–0)**	Vitalich (0–1)				3–1	
Feb. 15	vs. UC Riverside; Stacy Winsberg Memorial Tournament		Easton Stadium; Los Angeles, CA	**W** 11–3^{5}	**Brittany Finney (2–0)**	Olmos (1–3)				4–1	
Feb. 15	vs. Cal Poly; Stacy Winsberg Memorial Tournament		Easton Stadium	**W** 5–2	**Ava Tillmann (1–1)**	Best (0–3)	**Molly Jacobsen (1)**			5–1	
Feb. 16	vs. Oregon State; Stacy Winsberg Memorial Tournament		Easton Stadium	**W** 2–0	**Molly Jacobsen (2–0)**	Mazon (4–1)				6–1	
Feb. 16	at No. 2 UCLA; Stacy Winsberg Memorial Tournament		Easton Stadium	**L** 0–4	Garcia (3–0)	**Brittany Finney (2–1)**				6–2	
Feb. 17	vs. Boise State; Stacy Winsberg Memorial Tournament		LBSU Softball Complex; Long Beach, CA	**L** 4–6	Mancha (3–1)	**Ava Tillmann (1–2)**	Broadus (1)			6–3	
Feb. 22	vs. Tulsa; Texas Invitational		McCombs Field; Austin, TX	**L** 1–4	Delce (4–1)	**Brittany Finney (2–2)**	Scott (3)	Longhorn Network		6–4	
Feb. 22	vs. Sam Houston State; Texas Invitational		McCombs Field	**W** 5–1	**Molly Jacobsen (3–0)**	Sanchez (1–1)		Longhorn Network		7–4	
Feb. 23	vs. Sam Houston State; Texas Invitational		McCombs Field	**W** 2–1	**Ava Tillmann (2–2)**	Dunn (2–2)		Longhorn Network		8–4	
Feb. 23	at No. 11 Texas; Texas Invitational		McCombs Field	**L** 2–3	O'Leary (4–0)	**Molly Jacobsen (3–1)**		Longhorn Network		8–5	
Feb. 24	at No. 11 Texas; Texas Invitational		McCombs Field	**L** 0–7	Elish (4–0)	**Brittany Finney (2–3)**		Longhorn Network		8–6	
Feb. 27	at Central Arkansas		Farris Field; Conway, AR	**W** 18–3^{6}	**Ava Tillmann (3–2)**	Sanchez (2–3)				9–6	

March (15–3)
Date	Opponent	Rank	Site/stadium	Score	Win	Loss	Save	TV	Attendance	Overall record	SEC record
March 1	Nicholls; Ole Miss Classic		Ole Miss Softball Complex; Oxford, MS	**W** 6–0	**Brittany Finney (3–3)**	LaBure (2–6)		SECN+	362	10–6	
March 1	Pittsburgh; Ole Miss Classic		Ole Miss Softball Complex	**W** 6–1	**Molly Jacobsen (4–1)**	Edwards (0–4)		SECN+	418	11–6	
March 2	Pittsburgh; Ole Miss Classic		Ole Miss Softball Complex	**W** 4–3	**Brittany Finney (4–3)**	Knight (2–6)		SECN+	278	12–6	
March 2	Nicholls; Ole Miss Classic		Ole Miss Softball Complex	**W** 2–0	**Molly Jacobsen (5–1)**	Landry (8–4)		SECN+	173	13–6	
March 6	Austin Peay		Ole Miss Softball Complex	**W** 7–2	**Molly Jacobsen (6–1)**	Mardones (3–4)		SECN+	38	14–6	
March 9	No. 14 Arkansas		Ole Miss Softball Complex	**L** 4–10	Storms (8–0)	**Brittany Finney (4–4)**			348	14–7	0–1
March 10	No. 14 Arkansas		Ole Miss Softball Complex	**W** 12–0^{5}	**Molly Jacobsen (7–1)**	Haff (11–4)		SEC Network	757	15–7	1–1
March 11	No. 14 Arkansas		Ole Miss Softball Complex	**W** 6–2	**Molly Jacobsen (8–1)**	Storms (8–1)	**Brittany Finney (1)**	SEC Network	841	16–7	2–1
March 13	Memphis		Ole Miss Softball Complex	**W** 8–0^{6}	**Ava Tillmann (4–2)**	Nichols (4–5)		SECN+	207	17–7	
March 15	Samford		Ole Miss Softball Complex	**W** 15–2^{5}	**Brittany Finney (5–4)**	Yantis (0–5)		SECN+	208	18–7	
March 16	No. 18 Oklahoma State		Ole Miss Softball Complex	**W** 8–4	**Molly Jacobsen (9–1)**	Show (7–3)		SECN+	478	19–7	
March 17	Samford		Ole Miss Softball Complex	**W** 6–3	**Ava Tillmann (5–2)**	Barnett (1–1)	**Molly Jacobsen (2)**	SECN+	308	20–7	
March 17	No. 18 Oklahoma State		Ole Miss Softball Complex	**W** 10–1^{5}	**Brittany Finney (6–4)**	Simunek (4–3)		SECN+	526	21–7	
March 23	at No. 16 South Carolina	No. 24	Carolina Softball Stadium; Columbia, SC	**L** 0–2	Oh (3–2)	**Brittany Finney (6–5)**			1,814	21–8	2–2
March 24	at No. 16 South Carolina	No. 24	Carolina Softball Stadium	**W** 2–0^{8}	**Molly Jacobsen (10–1)**	Raley (7–2)		SEC Network	1,543	22–8	3–2
March 25	at No. 16 South Carolina	No. 24	Carolina Softball Stadium	**Cancelled due to weather.**							
March 29	No. 6 Florida	No. 22	Ole Miss Softball Complex	**L** 2–5^{15}	Barnhill (19–3)	**Molly Jacobsen (10–2)**		SECN+	1,371	22–9	3–3
March 30	No. 6 Florida	No. 22	Ole Miss Softball Complex	**W** 8–4^{8}	**Brittany Finney (7–5)**	Barnhill (19–4)		SECN+	1,003	23–9	4–3
March 31	No. 6 Florida	No. 22	Ole Miss Softball Complex	**W** 3–1	**Brittany Finney (8–5)**	Barnhill (19–5)	**Molly Jacobsen (3)**	SECN+	1,118	24–9	5–3

April (12–4)
Date Time	Opponent	Rank	Site/stadium	Score	Win	Loss	Save	TV	Attendance	Overall record	SEC record
April 2	at Belmont	No. 18	E. S. Rose Park; Nashville, TN	**W** 11–1^{5}	**Ava Tillmann (6–2)**	Veltri (9–5)		ESPN+	96	25–9	
April 5	at No. 22 Kentucky	No. 18	John Cropp Stadium; Lexington, KY	**L** 4–11	Humes (9–6)	**Molly Jacobsen (10–3)**		SECN+	1,304	25–10	5–4
April 6 (1)	at No. 22 Kentucky	No. 18	John Cropp Stadium	**W** 8–4	**Brittany Finney (9–5)**	Schorman (5–1)		SECN+	1,828 (DH)	26–10	6–4
April 6 (2)	at No. 22 Kentucky	No. 18	John Cropp Stadium	**W** 6–2^{8}	**Brittany Finney (10–5)**	Baalman (5–8)		SECN+	1,828 (DH)	27–10	7–4
April 10	UAB	No. 17	Ole Miss Softball Complex	**W** 3–2^{8}	**Brittany Finney (11–5)**	Cespedes (6–6)		SECN+	503	28–10	
April 12 (1)	Missouri	No. 17	Ole Miss Softball Complex	**W** 7–5^{8}	**Molly Jacobsen (11–3)**	Daniel (2–4)		SECN+	472	29–10	8–4
April 12 (2)	Missouri	No. 17	Ole Miss Softball Complex	**W** 1–0	**Molly Jacobsen (12–3)**	Gasper (9–5)		SECN+	627	30–10	9–4
April 14	Missouri	No. 17	Ole Miss Softball Complex	**L** 2–5	Gasper (10–5)	**Molly Jacobsen (12–4)**	Daniel (3)	SECN+	393	30–11	9–5
April 16	UT Martin	No. 17	Ole Miss Softball Complex	**W** 13–0^{5}	**Ava Tillmann (7–2)**	Gallagher (6–3)		SECN+	238	31–11	
April 19 (1)	at Mississippi State	No. 17	Nusz Park; Starkville, MS	**W** 21–0^{5}	**Brittany Finney (12–5)**	Denis (3–1)		SECN+	338	32–11	10–5
April 19 (2)	at Mississippi State	No. 17	Nusz Park	**L** 0–6	Williams (9–6)	**Molly Jacobsen (12–5)**		SEC Network	378	32–12	10–6
April 20	at Mississippi State	No. 17	Nusz Park	**W** 3–1^{8}	**Brittany Finney (13–5)**	Williams (9–7)		SECN+	803	33–12	11–6
April 24	Southern Miss	No. 17	Ole Miss Softball Complex	**W** 3–0	**Ava Tillmann (8–2)**	Trahan (14–9)		SEC Network	903	34–12	
April 26	No. 9 Tennessee	No. 17	Ole Miss Softball Complex	**W** 5–3	**Brittany Finney (14–5)**	Rogers (18–4)	**Molly Jacobsen (4)**	SECN+	976	35–12	12–6
April 27	No. 9 Tennessee	No. 17	Ole Miss Softball Complex	**W** 4–1	**Molly Jacobsen (13–5)**	Arnold (8–6)		SECN+	1,678	36–12	13–6
April 28	No. 9 Tennessee	No. 17	Ole Miss Softball Complex	**L** 1–2^{9}	Moss (11–2)	**Molly Jacobsen (12–6)**		ESPNU	1,734	36–13	13–7

May (0–3)
Date	Opponent	Rank	Site/stadium	Score	Win	Loss	Save	TV	Attendance	Overall record	SEC record
May 3	at No. 14 Georgia	No. 15	Jack Turner Stadium; Athens, GA	**L** 0–1	Bass (11–3)	**Brittany Finney (14–6)**		SECN+	927	36–14	13–8
May 5 (1)	at No. 14 Georgia	No. 15	Jack Turner Stadium	**L** 5–6	Mathis (8–4)	**Brittany Finney (14–7)**		SECN+	1,513	36–15	13–9
May 5 (2)	at No. 14 Georgia	No. 15	Jack Turner Stadium	**L** 0–8^{5}	Cutting (10–4)	**Brittany Finney (14–8)**		SEC Network	1,678	36–16	13–10

Postseason (3–2)

SEC Tournament (1–1)
Date	Opponent	Seed	Site/stadium	Score	Win	Loss	Save	TV	Attendance	Overall record	SECT Record
May 9	vs. (12) Mississippi State	(5)	Davis Diamond; College Station, TX	**W** 9–4	**Brittany Finney (15–8)**	Williams (13–8)		SECN	1,257	37–16	1–0
May 10	vs. (4) Kentucky	(5)	Davis Diamond	**L** 0–8^{5}	Humes (13–10)	**Brittany Finney (15–9)**		SECN	1,342	37–17	1–1

NCAA Division I softball tournament – Oxford Regional (2–1)
Date	Opponent	Seed/National Seed	Site/stadium	Score	Win	Loss	Save	TV	Attendance	Overall record	NCAAT record
May 17	(4) Chattanooga	(1) No. 11	Ole Miss Softball Complex	**W** 12–0^{5}	**Brittany Finney (16–9)**	Hudson (15–11)		ESPN3	1,620	38–17	1–0
May 18	(2) Louisiana	(1) No. 11	Ole Miss Softball Complex	**L** 0–2	Ellyson (39–4)	**Molly Jacobsen (13–7)**		ESPN3	1,683	38–18	1–1
May 18	(3) Southeast Missouri State	(1) No. 11	Ole Miss Softball Complex	**W** 10–0^{5}	**Brittany Finney (17–9)**	Anderson (5–4)		ESPN3	1,502	39–18	2–1
May 19 (1)	(2) Louisiana	(1) No. 11	Ole Miss Softball Complex	**W** 5–1	**Molly Jacobsen (14–7)**	Ellyson (39–5)		ESPN3	1,648	40–18	3–1
May 19 (2)	(2) Louisiana	(1) No. 11	Ole Miss Softball Complex	**W** 5–4	**Brittany Finney (18–9)**	Ellyson (39–6)		ESPN3	1,542	41–18	4–1

NCAA Division I softball tournament – Tucson Super Regional (0–2)
Date	Opponent	National Seed	Site/stadium	Score	Win	Loss	Save	TV	Attendance	Overall record	NCAAT record
May 24	at (6) Arizona	(11)	Rita Hillenbrand Memorial Stadium; Tucson, AZ	**L** 2–5	McQuillin (23–7)	**Brittany Finney (18–10)**		ESPNU	2,729	41–19	4–2
May 25	at (6) Arizona	(11)	Rita Hillenbrand Memorial Stadium	**L** 1–9	Denham (13–5)	**Molly Jacobsen (14–8)**		ESPN2	2,835	41–20	4–3

Schedule source:

== Oxford Regional ==
Oxford Regional Teams
(1) Ole Miss Rebels	(2) Louisiana Ragin' Cajuns	(3) Southeast Missouri State RedHawks	(4) Chattanooga Mocs

First Round
11	Ole Miss	12
Chattanooga	0
Southeast Missouri State	2
Louisiana	3
Lower round 1
Chattanooga	1
Southeast Missouri State	2

Semi-Finals
11	Ole Miss	0
Louisiana	2
Lower final
11	Ole Miss	10
Southeast Missouri State	0

Finals
Louisiana
11	Ole Miss
