= 2019 SEC softball tournament =

2019 Southeastern Conference softball tournament
- Teams: 13
- Format: Single-elimination tournament
- Finals site: Davis Diamond; College Station, Texas
- Champions: Florida (5th title)
- Runner-up: Alabama (8th title game)
- Winning coach: Tim Walton (5th title)
- MVP: Kelly Barnhill (Florida)
- Television: SECN; ESPN2

2019 Southeastern Conference softball standings
	Conf.				Overall
Team	W		L	PCT	W		L	PCT
No. 5 Alabama ‍†‍‍^{y}	18	–	6	.750	60	–	10	.857
No. 11 Tennessee ‍‍‍^{y}	14	–	10	.583	43	–	17	.717
No. 10 LSU ‍‍‍^{y}	14	–	10	.583	43	–	19	.694
No. 23 Kentucky ‍‍‍^{y}	14	–	10	.583	36	–	24	.600
No. 17 Ole Miss ‍‍‍^{y}	13	–	10	.565	41	–	20	.672
No. 8 Florida ‍‍‡‍^{y}	12	–	12	.500	49	–	18	.731
No. 14 Georgia ‍‍‍^{y}	12	–	12	.500	42	–	19	.689
No. 20 Arkansas ‍‍‍^{y}	12	–	12	.500	38	–	20	.655
Missouri ‍‍‍^{y}	12	–	12	.500	35	–	25	.583
No. 24 Auburn ‍‍‍^{y}	10	–	14	.417	39	–	21	.650
No. 21 South Carolina ‍‍‍^{y}	9	–	14	.391	38	–	19	.667
Mississippi State ‍‍‍^{y}	9	–	15	.375	35	–	23	.603
Texas A&M ‍‍‍^{y}	6	–	18	.250	28	–	27	.509
† – Conference champion ‡ – Tournament champion y – Invited to the NCAA tournament As of June 5, 2019; Rankings from NFCA

The 2019 SEC softball tournament was held at Davis Diamond on the campus of Texas A&M University in College Station, Texas, from May 8 through May 11, 2019. The tournament earns the Southeastern Conference's automatic bid to the 2019 NCAA Division I softball tournament. The Championship game, as well as the semifinals, was broadcast on ESPN2, while all other SEC tournament games were live on the SEC Network.

== Tournament ==
- Play-in Game (May 8): #12 Mississippi State vs. #13 Texas A&M - #12 Mississippi State wins 3–2

1st Round; May 8th/9th SECN
6	Florida	6
11	South Carolina	5
7	Missouri	0
10	Auburn	3
8	Georgia	4
9	Arkansas	1
5	Ole Miss	9
12	Mississippi State	4

Quarterfinals; May 9th/10th SECN
3	LSU	0
6	Florida	3
2	Tennessee	0
10	Auburn	2
1	Alabama	2
8	Georgia	1^{(8)}
4	Kentucky	8
5	Ole Miss	0

Semifinals; May 10th ESPN2
6	Florida	3
10	Auburn	0
1	Alabama	6
4	Kentucky	3

Finals; May 11th ESPN2
6	Florida	2
1	Alabama	1

== Schedule ==
Game	Time*	Matchup^{#}	Television	TV Announcers	Attendance
Play-in game – Wednesday, May 8
1		#12 Mississippi State vs. #13 Texas A&M	SEC Network		
First Round – Wednesday, May 8
2		#6 Florida vs. #11 South Carolina	SEC Network		
3		#7 Missouri vs. #10 Auburn	SEC Network		
First Round – Thursday, May 9
4		#8 Georgia vs. #9 Arkansas	SEC Network		
5		#5 Ole Miss vs. #12 Mississippi State	SEC Network		
Quarterfinals – Thursday, May 9
6		#3 LSU vs. #6 Florida	SEC Network		
7		#2 Tennessee vs. #10 Auburn	SEC Network		
8		#1 Alabama vs. #8 Georgia	SEC Network	Beth Mowins, Michelle Smith, Amanda Scarborough	
Quarterfinals – Friday, May 10
9	11:00 a.m.	#4 Kentucky vs. #5 Ole Miss	SEC Network		
Semifinals – Friday, May 10
10	4:30 p.m.	#6 Florida vs. #10 Auburn	ESPN2	Beth Mowins, Michelle Smith, Amanda Scarborough, & Tiffany Greene	
11	7:00 p.m.	#1 Alabama vs. #4 Kentucky	ESPN2	Beth Mowins, Michelle Smith, Amanda Scarborough, & Tiffany Greene	
Championship – Saturday, May 11
12	8:00 p.m.	Alabama vs. Florida	ESPN2	Beth Mowins, Michelle Smith, Amanda Scarborough	
*Game times in EDT. # – Rankings denote tournament seed.
