= 2019 Louisiana Ragin' Cajuns softball team =

University team

2019 Louisiana Ragin' Cajuns softball

Oxford Regionals Appearance Sun Belt Conference Regular season Champions Sun Belt Conference Tournament champions
- Conference: Sun Belt Conference

Ranking
- Coaches: No. 17
- Record: 52–6 (25–0 SBC)
- Head coach: Gerry Glasco (2nd season)
- Assistant coaches: Mike Roberts; Lacy Prejean
- Home stadium: Yvette Girouard Field at Lamson Park

2019 Sun Belt Conference softball standings
	Conf.				Overall
Team	W		L	PCT	W		L	PCT
No. 17 Louisiana ‍†‍‡‍^{y}	25	–	0	1.000	52	–	6	.897
Troy ‍‍‍	19	–	8	.704	37	–	20	.649
UT Arlington ‍‍‍	17	–	10	.630	36	–	27	.571
Texas State ‍‍‍	16	–	10	.615	29	–	25	.537
Appalachian State ‍‍‍	13	–	13	.500	31	–	25	.554
Coastal Carolina ‍‍‍	13	–	14	.481	39	–	21	.650
Georgia Southern ‍‍‍	9	–	17	.346	23	–	28	.451
Louisiana–Monroe ‍‍‍	7	–	17	.292	14	–	42	.250
South Alabama ‍‍‍	7	–	20	.259	18	–	31	.367
Georgia State ‍‍‍	5	–	22	.185	8	–	46	.148
† – Conference champion ‡ – Tournament champion y – Invited to the NCAA tournament As of June 14, 2019; Rankings from NFCA

The 2019 Louisiana Ragin' Cajuns softball team represented the University of Louisiana at Lafayette in the 2019 NCAA Division I softball season. The Ragin' Cajuns played their home games at Yvette Girouard Field at Lamson Park and were led by second-year head coach Gerry Glasco.

The Cajuns defeated Southeast Missouri State and Ole Miss early in the Oxford Regionals. They went on to the Championship Game but lost to Ole Miss 1-5, forcing the game 7. In game 7, the Cajuns rallied back from 0-3 by a three-run homerun by Raina O'Neal. They took the lead at 4-3 before losing to Ole Miss after the Rebels scored two runs late in the 7th inning.

== Preseason ==
=== Sun Belt Conference Coaches Poll ===
The Sun Belt Conference Coaches Poll was released on February 1, 2019. Louisiana was picked to finish first in the Sun Belt Conference with 98 votes and 8 first place votes.

Coaches poll
Predicted finish	Team	Votes (1st place)
1	Louisiana	98 (8)
2	Texas State	88 (1)
3	Troy	82 (1)
4	UT Arlington	62
5	Georgia State	59
6	South Alabama	57
7	Georgia Southern	39
8	Coastal Carolina	27
8	Louisiana-Monroe	27
10	Appalachian State	11

=== Preseason All-Sun Belt team ===
- Summer Ellyson (LA, JR, Pitcher)
- Annie Willis (TROY, SO, Pitcher)
- Lexie Comeaux (LA, SR, Catcher)
- Reagan Wright (UTA, JR, Catcher)
- Haleigh Davis (TXST, JR, Catcher)
- Hailey MacKay (TXST, JR, 1st Base)
- Katie Webb (TROY, JR, 1st Base)
- Kristin Hawkins (GSU, SR, 2nd Base)
- Kara Gremillion (LA, SR, 3rd Base)
- Alissa Dalton (LA, JR, Shortstop)
- Jayden Mount (ULM, JR, Shortstop)
- Courtney Dean (CCU, SO, Outfield)
- Sydney McKay (ULM, SR, Outfield)
- Laura Curry (UTA, SR, Outfield)
- Jenny Dodd (APST, SR, Designated Player)

Sun Belt Conference Preseason Player of the Year

- Alissa Dalton (LA, JR, Shortstop)

Sun Belt Conference Preseason Pitcher of the Year

- Summer Ellyson (LA, JR, Pitcher)

== Roster ==
2019 Louisiana Ragin' Cajuns roster
Pitchers: 9 Summer Ellyson – junior; 10 Alison Deville – senior; 11 Megan Kleist – senior; 18 Casey Dixon – sophomore; 28 Carrie Boswell – sophomore; 53 Kandra Lamb – freshman; Outfielders: 2 Raina O'Neal – sophomore; 4 Keeli Milligan – senior; 6 Morgan Gray – junior; Aeriyl Mass – sophomore; 16 Kendall Talley – sophomore; 35 Sarah Hudek – junior	Catchers: 19 Lexie Comeaux – senior; 23 Julie Rawls – junior; Infielders: 7 Alaina Guarino – junior; 12 Brittany Holland – sophomore; 17 Bailey Curry – sophomore; 22 Jolie Readeaux – sophomore; 24 Casidy Chaumont – sophomore; 31 Tiana Patrick – sophomore; 34 Caylon Brabham – freshman; 39 Kara Gremillion – senior; 41 Mila Rodriguez – freshman; 42 Rylee Keith – freshman; 44 Kourtney Gremillion – sophomore

=== Coaching staff ===
2019 Louisiana Ragin' Cajuns coaching staff
- Gerry Glasco – Head coach – 2nd year
- Mike Roberts – Associate Head coach – 1st year
- Lacy Prejean – Assistant Head coach – 1st year
- Geri Ann Glasco – Volunteer Assistant Coach – 1st year
- Ashley Pauly – Chief of Staff – 1st year
- Collin Hopkins – Manager
- Tyler Thackston – Manager
- Dylan Stelly – Manager
- Denee Simon – Office Manager

== Schedule and results ==
Legend
	Louisiana win
	Louisiana loss
	Postponement/Cancellation
**Bold**	Louisiana team member

2019 Louisiana Ragin' Cajuns Softball Game Log
Regular season (47-4)

February (14-2)
Date	Opponent	Rank	Site/stadium	Score	Win	Loss	Save	TV	Attendance	Overall record	SBC record
Ragin' Cajun Invitational
Feb. 7	Fordham	No.15	Lamson Park • Lafayette, LA	**W** 4-0	**Ellyson** (1-0)	Aughinbaugh (0-1)	None	Ragin' Cajuns Digital Network	1,678	1-0	
Feb. 8	Incarnate Word	No. 15	Lamson Park • Lafayette, LA	**W** 11-0 (5 inn)	**Lamb** (1-0)	Colema (0-1)	None	Ragin' Cajuns Digital Network		2-0	
Feb. 8	Texas A&M-Corpus Christi	No. 15	Lamson Park • Lafayette, LA	**W** 15-0 (5 inn)	**Ellyson** (2-0)	Smith (0-1)	None	Ragin' Cajuns Digital Network	1,690	3-0	
Feb. 9	Texas A&M-Corpus Christi	No. 15	Lamson Park • Lafayette, LA	**W** 21-0 (5 inn)	**Lamb** (2-0)	Ruel (0-2)	None	Ragin' Cajuns Digital Network	1,887	4-0	
Feb. 11	RV California	No. 15	Lamson Park • Lafayette, LA	**W** 7-1	**Ellyson** (3-0)	Conley (1-1)	None	Ragin' Cajuns Digital Network		5-0	
Feb. 11	RV California	No. 15	Lamson Park • Lafayette, LA	**W** 7-3	**Ellyson** (4-0)	Dung (1-1)	None	Ragin' Cajuns Digital Network	1,852	6-0	
Louisiana Classics
Feb. 15	Jackson State	No. 13	Lamson Park • Lafayette, LA	**W** 9-0 (5 inn)	**Boswell** (1-0)	Jones (0-3)	None	Ragin' Cajuns Digital Network		7-0	
Feb. 15	Austin Peay	No. 13	Lamson Park • Lafayette, LA	**W** 2-1	**Ellyson** (5-0)	Rackel (2-2)	None	Ragin' Cajuns Digital Network	1,760	8-0	
Feb. 16	Stephen F. Austin	No. 13	Lamson Park • Lafayette, LA	**W** 9-1 (6 inn)	**Ellyson** (6-0)	Wilbur (5-1)	None	Ragin' Cajuns Digital Network		9-0	
Feb. 16	Austin Peay	No. 13	Lamson Park • Lafayette, LA	**W** 8-0 (6 inn)	**Ellyson** (7-0)	Rackel (2-3)	None	Ragin' Cajuns Digital Network	1,760	10-0	
Feb. 17	Stephen F. Austin	No. 13	Lamson Park • Lafayette, LA	**W** 5-2	**Boswell** (2-0)	Wilbur (5-2)	None	Ragin' Cajuns Digital Network	1,639	11-0	
Baylor Invitational
Feb. 22	vs. Kent State	No. 10	Getterman Stadium • Waco, TX	**W** 21-1 (5 inn)	**Boswell** (3-0)	Huck (0-3)	None	None	905	12-0	
Feb. 22	vs. No. 21 Baylor	No. 10	Getterman Stadium • Waco, TX	**W** 5-2	**Ellyson** (8-0)	Lindsey (3-1)	None	None	1020	13-0	
Feb. 23	vs. North Texas	No. 10	Getterman Stadium • Waco, TX	**W** 10-2 (5 inn)	**Lamb** (3-0)	Tindell (0-1)	None	None		14-0	
Feb. 23	vs. North Texas	No. 10	Getterman Stadium • Waco, TX	**L** 1-5	Trautwein (4-1)	**Ellyson** (8-1)	None	None	1,130	14-1	
Feb. 24	vs. No. 21 Baylor	No. 10	Getterman Stadium • Waco, TX	**L** 3-4 (8 inn)	Holman (5-2)	**Ellyson** (8-2)	None	None	733	14-2	

March (15-2)
Date	Opponent	Rank	Site/stadium	Score	Win	Loss	Save	TV	Attendance	Overall record	SBC record
Oklahoma Courtyard Marriott Tournament
Mar. 1	vs. No. 23 Oregon State	No. 11	OU Softball Complex • Norman, OK	**W** 8-0 (5 inn)	**Ellyson** (9-2)	Nelson (4-1)	None	None	345	15–2	
Mar. 1	vs. No. 4 Oklahoma	No. 11	Marita Hynes Field at OU Sports Complex • Norman, OK	**L** 1-9 (5 inn)	Juarez (6-0)	**Ellyson** (9-3)	None	None	1,520	15–3	
Mar. 2	vs. No. 23 Oregon State	No. 11	OU Sports Complex • Norman, OK	Game Cancelled due to cold and stormy weather							
Mar. 2	vs. No. 4 Oklahoma	No. 11	OU Sports Complex • Norman, OK	Game Cancelled due to cold and stormy weather							
Mar. 8	at Texas State	No. 11	Bobcat Softball Stadium • San Marcos, TX	**W** 6-1	**Ellyson** (10-3)	King (4-8)	None	None	917	16–3	1-0
Mar. 9	at Texas State	No. 11	Bobcat Softball Stadium • San Marcos, TX	**W** 5-3	**Ellyson** (11-3)	Jacobs (0-2)	None	None	863	17–3	2-0
Mar. 10	at Texas State	No. 11	Bobcat Softball Stadium • San Marcos, TX	**W** 7-4	**Ellyson** (12-3)	Jacobs (0-3)	None	None	743	18–3	3-0
Mar. 11	RV Baylor	No. 11	Lamson Park • Lafayette, LA	**W** 4-1	**Ellyson** (13-3)	Holman (6-4)	None	CST		19–3	
Mar. 13	at Nicholls	No. 11	Colonels Softball Complex • Thibodaux, LA	**W** 8-0	**Ellyson** (14-3)	Landry (10-5)	None	None	307	20–3	
Mar. 15	Troy	No. 10	Yvette Girouard Field at Lamson Park • Lafayette, LA	**W** 9-1 (6 inn)	**Ellyson** (15-3)	Johnson (12-4)	None	ESPN+	1,811	21–3	4-0
Mar. 16	Troy	No. 10	Yvette Girouard Field at Lamson Park • Lafayette, LA	**W** 8-0 (6 inn)	**Ellyson** (16-3)	Willis (5-6)	None	Ragin' Cajuns Digital Network	2,173	22–3	5-0
Mar. 17	Troy	No. 10	Yvette Girouard Field at Lamson Park • Lafayette, LA	**W** 8-0 (5 inn)	**Ellyson** (17-3)	Johnson (12-5)	None	Ragin' Cajuns Digital Network	1,865	23–3	6-0
Mar. 20	McNeese State	No. 9	Yvette Girouard Field at Lamson Park • Lafayette, LA	**L** 4-5 (11 inn)	Settle (4-5)	**Ellyson** (17-4)	None	Ragin' Cajuns Digital Network	1,815	23–4	
Mar. 22	at South Alabama	No. 9	Jaguar Field • Mobile, AL	**W** 11-7	**Boswell** (4-0)	Reid (8-10)	None	JagNationTV	513	24–4	7-0
Mar. 23	at South Alabama	No. 9	Jaguar Field • Mobile, AL	**W** 11-2 (5 inn)	**Boswell** (5-0)	Reid (8-11)	None	JagNationTV	621	25–4	8-0
Mar. 24	at South Alabama	No. 9	Jaguar Field • Mobile, AL	**W** 14-0 (6 inn)	**Ellyson** (18-4)	Finnical (1-2)	None	JagNationTV	578	26–4	9-0
Mar. 29	at Georgia Southern	No. 10	Eagle Field at GS Softball Complex • Statesboro, GA	**W** 2-0	**Ellyson** (19-4)	Waldrep (4-9)	None	ESPN+	315	27–4	10-0
Mar. 30	at Georgia Southern	No. 10	Eagle Field at GS Softball Complex • Statesboro, GA	**W** 6-3	**Boswell** (6-0)	Handler (1-2)	**Ellyson** (1)	True Blue TV	397	28–4	11-0
Mar. 31	at Georgia Southern	No. 10	Eagle Field at GS Softball Complex • Statesboro, GA	**W** 3-1	**Ellyson** (20-4)	Waldrep (4-10)	None	ESPN+	346	29–4	12-0

April (17–0)
Date	Opponent	Rank	Site/stadium	Score	Win	Loss	Save	TV	Attendance	Overall record	SBC record
April 3	at McNeese State	No. 10	Joe Miller Field at Cowgirl Diamond • Lake Charles, LA	**W** 4-0	**Ellyson** (21-4)	Settle (4-7)	None	CowboyInsider	753	30–4	
April 5	UT Arlington	No. 10	Yvette Girouard Field at Lamson Park • Lafayette, LA	**W** 4-1	**Ellyson** (22-4)	Phillips (9-11)	None	ESPN+	1,860	31–4	13-0
April 6	UT Arlington	No. 10	Yvette Girouard Field at Lamson Park • Lafayette, LA	**W** 2-0	**Ellyson** (23-4)	Valencia (3-5)	None	Ragin' Cajuns Digital Network		32–4	14-0
April 6	UT Arlington	No. 10	Yvette Girouard Field at Lamson Park • Lafayette, LA	**W** 4-2	**Boswell** (7-0)	Phillips (9-12)	**Ellyson** (2)	Ragin' Cajuns Digital Network	1,908	33–4	15-0
April 10	Southeastern Louisiana	No. 10	Yvette Girouard Field at Lamson Park • Lafayette, LA	**W** 7-1	**Boswell** (8-0)	McDonald (8-5)	None	Ragin' Cajuns Digital Network	1,727	34–4	
April 12	at Appalachian State	No. 10	ASU Softball Stadium • Boone, NC	**W** 3-1	**Ellyson** (24-4)	Longanecker (14-4)	None	AppVision	182	35–4	16-0
April 13	at Appalachian State	No. 10	ASU Softball Stadium • Boone, NC	**W** 8-0 (5 inn)	**Ellison** (25-4)	Holland (8-6)	None	AppVision	174	36–4	17-0
April 13	at Appalachian State	No. 10	ASU Softball Stadium • Boone, NC	**W** 15-5 (8 inn)	**Deville** (1-0)	Siemer (2-3)	None	AppVision	121	37–4	18-0
April 15	at Campbell	No. 10	Amanda Littlejohn Stadium • Buies Creek, NC	**W** 3-0	**Boswell** (9-0)	Richards (12-10)	**Deville** (1)	ESPN+	213	38–4	
April 16	at UNC Greensboro	No. 10	UNCG Softball Stadium • Greensboro, NC	**W** 6-2	**Ellyson** (26-4)	Bryden (18-8)	None	ESPN+	166	39–4	
April 18	Georgia State	No. 10	Yvette Girouard Field at Lamson Park • Lafayette, LA	**W** 10-2 (6 inn)	**Ellyson** (27-4)	Soles (3-13)	None	ESPN+	1,682	40–4	19-0
April 19	Georgia State	No. 10	Yvette Girouard Field at Lamson Park • Lafayette, LA	**W** 12-3 (5 inn)	**Ellyson** (28-4)	Chance (0-13)	None	Ragin' Cajuns Digital Network	1,761	41-4	20-0
April 20	Georgia State	No. 10	Yvette Girouard Field at Lamson Park • Lafayette, LA	**W** 10-2 (5 inn)	**Ellyson** (29-4)	Freeman (3-12)	None	Ragin' Cajuns Digital Network	1,904	42–4	21-0
April 24	at Louisiana Tech	No. 8	Lady Techster Softball Complex • Ruston, LA	**W** 7-2	**Ellyson** (30-4)	Chapman (3-1)	None	CUSA.TV	675	43–4	
April 26	Coastal Carolina	No. 8	Yvette Girouard Field at Lamson Park • Lafayette, LA	**W** 5-2	**Ellyson** (31-4)	Beasley-Polko (21-11)	None	ESPN+	1,782	44–4	22-0
April 27	Coastal Carolina	No. 8	Yvette Girouard Field at Lamson Park • Lafayette, LA	**W** 8-0 (5 inn)	**Ellyson** (32-4)	Guillette (12-6)	None	Ragin' Cajuns Digital Network	1,817	45–4	23-0
April 28	Coastal Carolina	No. 8	Yvette Girouard Field at Lamson Park • Lafayette, LA	**W** 3-2	**Ellyson** (33-4)	Beasley-Polko (21-12)	None	Ragin' Cajuns Digital Network	1,829	46–4	24-0

May (1-0)
Date	Opponent	Rank	Site/stadium	Score	Win	Loss	Save	TV	Attendance	Overall record	SBC record
May 2	at Louisiana-Monroe	No. 8	Geo-Surfaces Field at the ULM Softball Complex • Monroe, LA	**W** 3-0	**Ellyson** (34-4)	Chavarria (6-14)	None	Warhawks All-Access	260	47–4	25-0
May 4	at Louisiana-Monroe	No. 8	Geo-Surface Field at the ULM Softball Complex • Monroe, LA	Game Cancelled due to field conditions at the ULM Softball Complex due to ongoing rain							
May 4	at Louisiana-Monroe	No. 8	Geo-Surface Field at the ULM Softball Complex • Monroe, LA	Game cancelled due to field conditions at the ULM Softball Complex due to ongoing rain							

Postseason (5-2)

SBC Tournament (3-0)
Date	Opponent	(Seed)/Rank	Site/stadium	Score	Win	Loss	Save	TV	Attendance	Overall record	SBC record
May 9	vs. (4) Texas State	(1)/No. 7	Bobcat Softball Complex • San Marcos, TX	**W** 4-3	**Ellyson** (35-4)	Barrera (9-6)	None	ESPN+		48–4	
May 10	vs. (6) Coastal Carolina	(1)/No. 7	Bobcat Softball Complex • San Marcos, TX	**W** 5-2	**Ellyson** (36-4)	Beasley-Polko (23-13)	None	ESPN+		49–4	
May 11	vs. (6) Coastal Carolina	(1)/No. 7	Bobcat Softball Complex • San Marcos, TX	**W** 1-0	**Ellyson** (37-4)	Guillette (16-8)	None	ESPN+		50–4	

NCAA Division I softball tournament (2-2)
Date	Opponent	(Seed)/Rank	Site/stadium	Score	Win	Loss	Save	TV	Attendance	Overall record	SBC record
Oxford Regionals
May 17	vs. (3) Southeast Missouri State	(2)/No. 7	Ole Miss Softball Complex • Oxford, MS	**W** 3-2	**Ellyson** (38-4)	Thogmartin (22-7)	None	ESPN3	1,490	51–4	
May 18	vs. (1) No. 17 Ole Miss	(2)/No. 7	Ole Miss Softball Complex • Oxford, MS	**W** 2-0	**Ellyson** (39-4)	Jacobsen (13-7)	None	ESPN3	1,683	52-4	
May 19	vs. (1) No. 17 Ole Miss	(2)/No. 7	Ole Miss Softball Complex • Oxford, MS	**L** 1-5	Jacobsen (14-7)	**Ellyson** (39-5)	'None	ESPN3		52-5	
May 19	vs. (1) No. 17 Ole Miss	(2)/No. 7	Ole Miss Softball Complex • Oxford, MS	**L** 4-5	Finney (18-9)	**Ellyson** (39-6)	None	ESPN3		52-6	

Schedule source:

*Rankings are based on the team's current ranking in the NFCA/USA Softball poll.

== Oxford Regional ==
Oxford Regional Teams
(1) Ole Miss Rebels	(2) Louisiana Ragin' Cajuns	(3) Southeast Missouri State RedHawks	(4) Chattanooga Mocs

First Round
11	Ole Miss	12
Chattanooga	0
Southeast Missouri State	2
Louisiana	3
Lower round 1
Chattanooga	1
Southeast Missouri State	2

Semi-Finals
11	Ole Miss	0
Louisiana	2
Lower final
11	Ole Miss	10
Southeast Missouri State	0

Finals
Louisiana	1	4
11	Ole Miss	5	5
