= 2019 Summit League softball tournament =

- Teams: 6
- Format: Double-elimination
- Finals site: Tharaldson Park
- Champions: North Dakota State (10th title)
- Runner-up: South Dakota
- Winning coach: Darren Mueller (10th title)
- MVP: Paige Vargas (North Dakota State)
- Television: MidcoSN

2019 Summit League softball standings
	Conf.				Overall
Team	W		L	PCT	W		L	PCT
North Dakota State ‍†‍‡‍^{y}	16	–	2	.889	42	–	16	.724
South Dakota ‍‍‍	12	–	6	.667	33	–	28	.541
Western Illinois ‍‍‍	12	–	6	.667	20	–	20	.500
South Dakota State ‍‍‍	11	–	7	.611	37	–	19	.661
North Dakota ‍‍‍	7	–	11	.389	22	–	34	.393
Purdue Fort Wayne ‍‍‍	3	–	15	.167	10	–	39	.204
Omaha ‍‍‍	2	–	16	.111	4	–	43	.085
† – Conference champion ‡ – Tournament champion y – Invited to the NCAA tournament As of June 14, 2019; Rankings from NFCA

The 2019 Summit League softball tournament took place from May 8–11, 2019. The top six regular-season finishers of the league's seven teams met in the double-elimination tournament at the Ellig Sports Complex on the campus of North Dakota State University in Fargo, North Dakota.
North Dakota State was the defending champion, and successfully defended their title following their defeat of second-seeded South Dakota in the final round. This was the tenth Summit League title for the Bison, who earned the Summit League's automatic berth to the 2019 NCAA Division I softball tournament with the tournament title.

== Format and Seeding ==
The top six teams from the regular season were seeded one through six based on conference record during the league regular season. The tournament played out as a modified double-elimination tournament, with the bottom four seeds playing each other in the single-elimination first round. The remaining rounds of the tournament were double-elimination.

== Schedule ==
Game	Time*	Matchup^{#}	Television	Location	Attendance
First Round – Wednesday, May 8
1	3:00 PM	#4 South Dakota State 4 vs. #5 North Dakota 2	MidcoSN	Tharaldson Park	
2	5:30 PM	#3 Western Illinois 5 vs.^{(8)} #6 Purdue Fort Wayne 7	MidcoSN	Tharaldson Park	
Quarterfinals - Thursday, May 9
3	12:00 PM	#1 North Dakota State 6 vs. #4 South Dakota State 3	MidcoSN	Tharaldson Park	
4	2:30 PM	#2 South Dakota 5 vs. #6 Purdue Fort Wayne 1	MidcoSN	Tharaldson Park	
5	5:00 PM	#4 South Dakota State 7 vs. #6 Purdue Fort Wayne 6	MidcoSN	Tharaldson Park	
Semifinals - Friday, May 10
6	12:00 PM	#1 North Dakota State 1 vs. #2 South Dakota 10	MidcoSN	Tharaldson Park	
7	2:30 PM	#1 North Dakota State 6 vs. #4 South Dakota State 3	MidcoSN	Tharaldson Park	
Finals - Saturday, May 11
8	1:00 PM	#1 North Dakota State 6 vs. #2 South Dakota 0	MidcoSN	Tharaldson Park	
9	3:30 PM	#1 North Dakota State 3 vs. #2 South Dakota 1	MidcoSN	Tharaldson Park	
*Game times in CDT. # - Rankings denote tournament seed. Reference:

== All-Tournament Team ==
The following players were named to the All-Tournament Team:

Player	School
Paige Vargas (MVP)	North Dakota State
Madyson Camacho	North Dakota State
Maddie Hansen	North Dakota State
Katie Shoultz	North Dakota State
Vanessa Anderson	North Dakota State
Jessica Rogers	South Dakota
Alyssa Rogers	South Dakota
Dustie Durham	South Dakota
Alexis Devers	South Dakota
Mallory McQuistan	South Dakota State
Kendra Conard	South Dakota State
Julia Andersen	South Dakota State
Lauren Watson	Purdue Fort Wayne
Abby Baez	Purdue Fort Wayne
Jailene Carpio	North Dakota
Payton Abbott	Western Illinois
