= Holly Ward (softball) =

American softball player (born 1996)

Current position
- Title: Assistant head coach
- Team: Troy
- Conference: Sun Belt

Biographical details
- Born: April 15, 1996 (age 30); Jasper, Alabama, U.S.
- Education: Mississippi State University

Playing career
- 2009–2014: Haleyville HS
- 2015–2018: Mississippi State
- 2018: Scrap Yard Dawgs
- Position: Pitcher

Coaching career (HC unless noted)
- 2019: Mississippi State (AHC)
- 2020–2022; 2022–present: Troy (AHC)
- 2022: Troy (Interim)

Accomplishments and honors

Championships
- 2× Alabama State 4A Softball Titles (2013, 2014)

Awards
- As a Player: Alabama Gatorade Softball Player of the Year (2014)

Holly Chase Ward (born April 15, 1996) is an American softball player who is currently the Assistant Head Coach at Troy. She attended Haleyville High School in Haleyville, Alabama. She later attended Mississippi State University, where she played pitcher on the Mississippi State Bulldogs softball team. While playing for Mississippi State, Ward threw a perfect game on February 9, 2018; a 10–0 victory in 5 innings over Mississippi Valley State. After graduating from Mississippi State, Ward played professional softball with the Scrap Yard Fast Pitch team in Houston, Texas.
