= Troy Softball Complex =

Softball stadium in Troy, Alabama

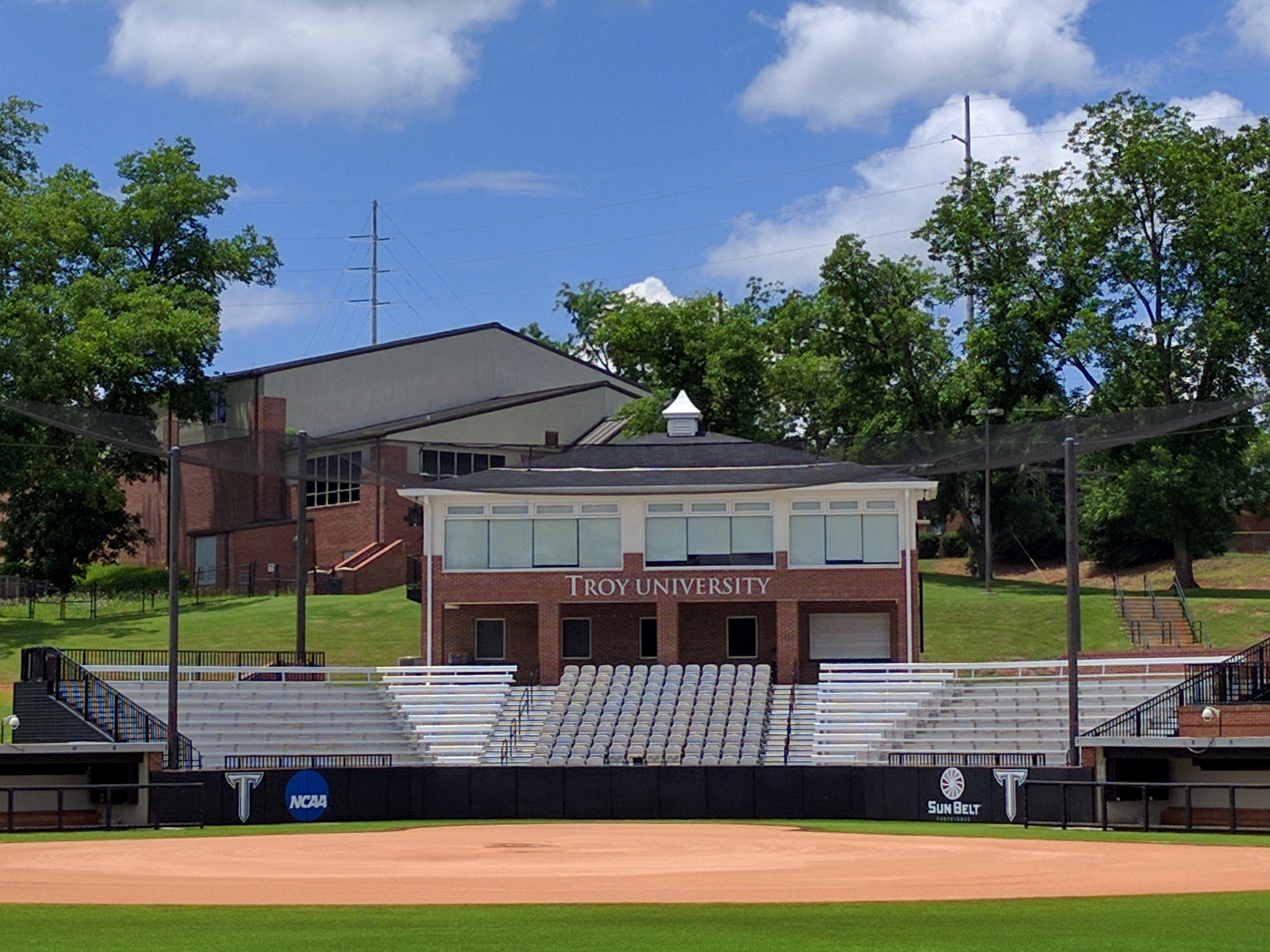
- Interactive map of Troy Softball Complex
- Location: Elm Street, Troy, Alabama, 36082
- Coordinates: 31°48′24″N 85°57′24″W
- Owner: Troy University
- Operator: Troy University
- Seating type: Chair-back and Bleacher-back
- Capacity: 800
- Surface: ProGrass
- Scoreboard: Daktronics Full-Box LED
- Record attendance: 2,121 (March 23, 2022 vs. Florida State)
- Field size: Left Field: 200 ft Center Field: 220 ft Right Field: 200 ft

Construction
- Groundbreaking: 2001
- Opened: 2002
- Renovated: 2014
- Expanded: 2014
- Main contractor: Whaley Construction Co.

Tenant
- Troy Trojans softball (NCAA) (2002-Present)

The Troy Softball Complex, built in 2002 on the campus of Troy University, is the home stadium for the Division I (NCAA) Troy Trojans softball team. In 2014, the entire complex underwent a $3 million renovation project. The official seating capacity is 800, with 120 of the seats being chairback seating. The Dodd Center was built in 2014 during the renovation, which houses coaches offices, player lounge, and locker rooms, and indoor batting cages. In the opening game of 2014, Troy hosted Auburn at the newly renovated field, finishing in a 5–5 tie with the Tigers.

The Lady Trojans' record at home is 377-193-2 as of the end of the 2018 season.

== Features ==
The Troy Softball Complex underwent a $3-million renovation project prior to the 2014 season. The project included leveling the softball field to improve sight lines, an updated press box that included new offices, a media area with press area, and an expanded concessions area. New officials locker rooms were also added to the facility. The project also featured the addition of the 8,000 square-foot Dodds Center, a state-of-the-art training and housing facility for players and coaches.

Additionally, the playing surface was replaced and ProGrass artificial turf was installed in the outfield and an underground water drainage system was installed. The original basic scoreboard was replaced with a Daktronics Full-Box LED scoreboard with the Troy Athletics logo. The seating areas received an upgrade as well, replacing the original metal erector stand bleachers with a permanent grandstand that features 120 chair-back seats and 680 bench-back seats. Because of this, the original seating capacity expanded from 500 seats to 800 seats. A party deck was also constructed over the visitor's dugout.

== The Dodds Center ==
The Dodds Center is a state-of-the-art hitting facility that was constructed in the off-season of 2014 as part of the softball complex renovations. The 8,000 square foot facility houses full-size player locker rooms, a player lounge, an athletic training room, coaches' offices, equipment storage rooms, and indoor hitting and pitching areas. It was named in honor of Mike and Cindy Dodds for their devotion to Troy University athletics.

== Top 25 Wins at Home ==
Home Wins Against Top 25
Year	Opponent	Score
2001	#17 Florida State	2-1
2006	#13 Louisiana	3-2
2012	#21 Auburn	7-1
2012	#8 Louisiana	9-4
2012	#22 Florida State	4-3
2015	#22 South Alabama	6-3
2017	#19 Pittsburgh	7-2
2018	#21 Louisiana	2-1
2018	#21 Texas State	4-3
2018	#21 Texas State	1-0

== Gallery ==
Troy Softball Complex Gallery
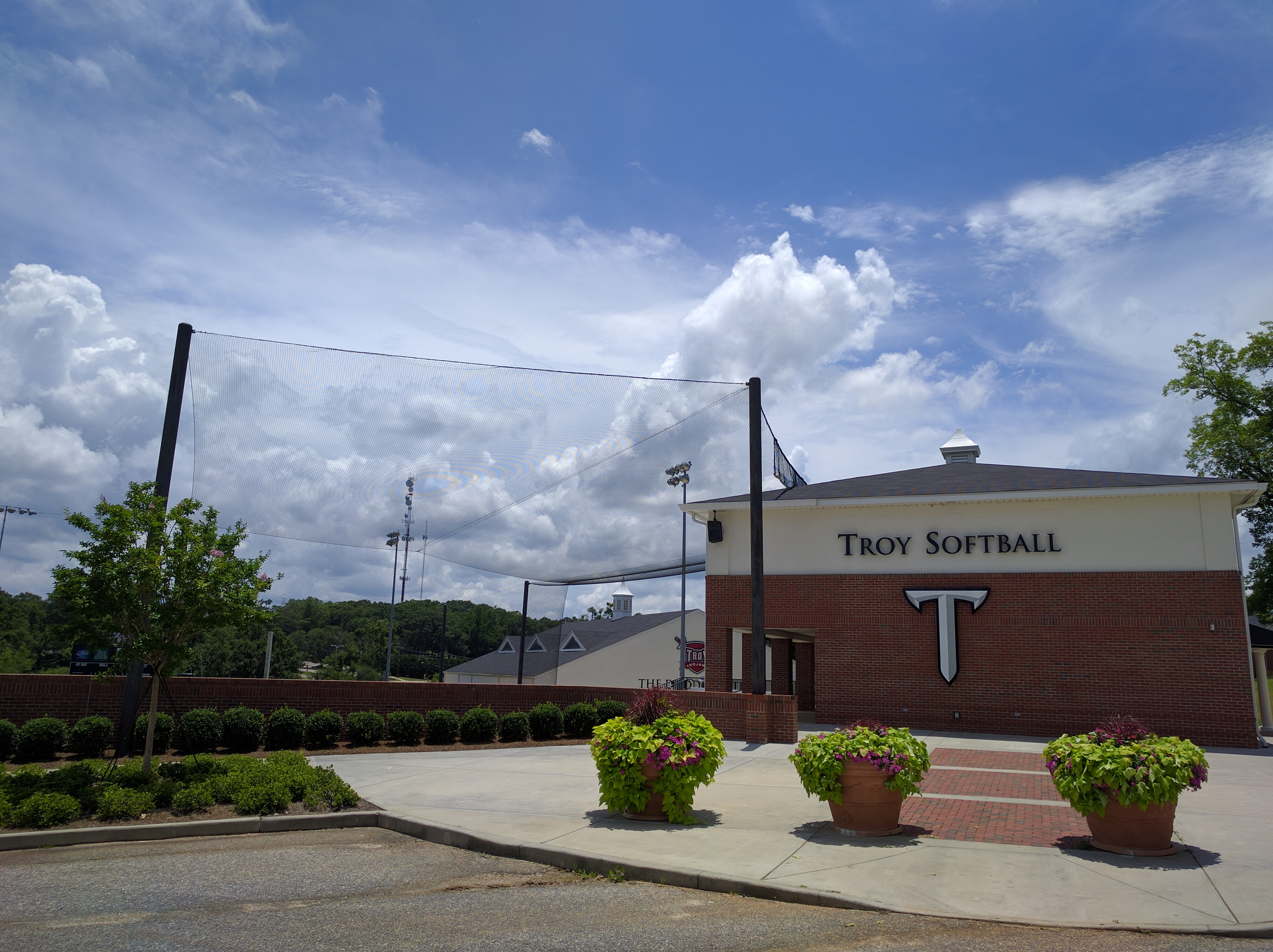
Entrance Plaza to the stadium

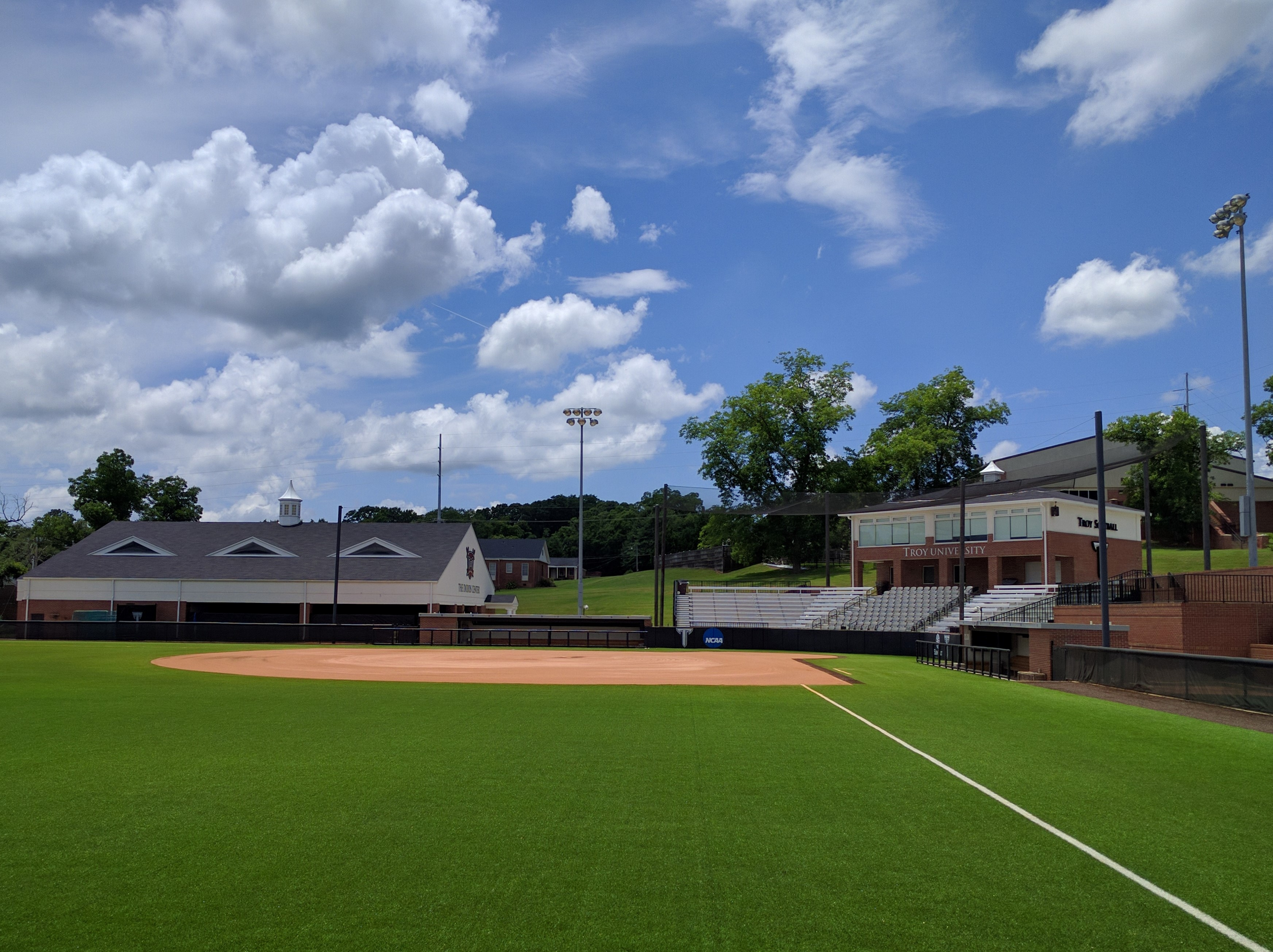
View of The Dodds Center (left) and grandstand

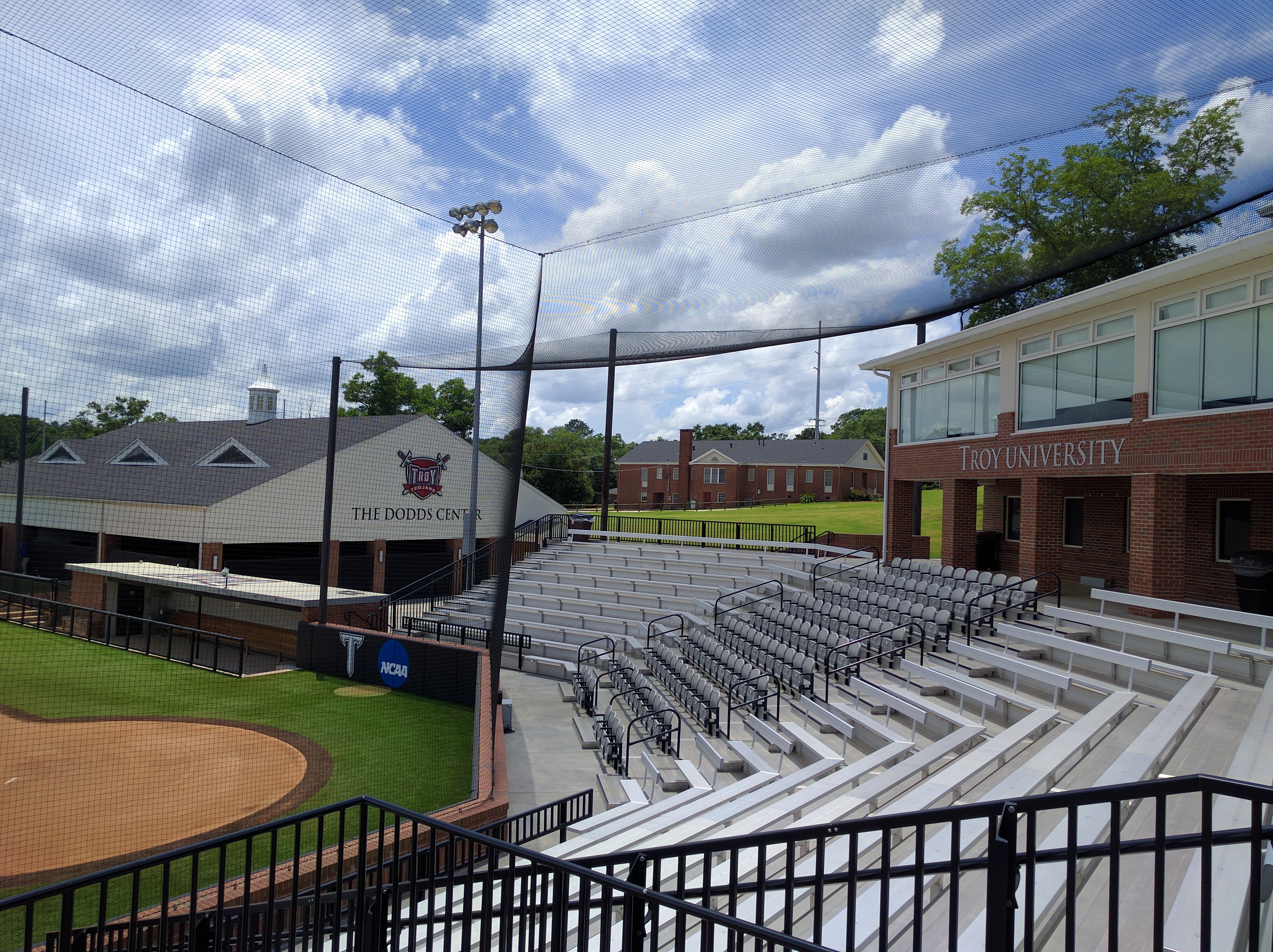
View of The Dodds Center, grandstand, and press box

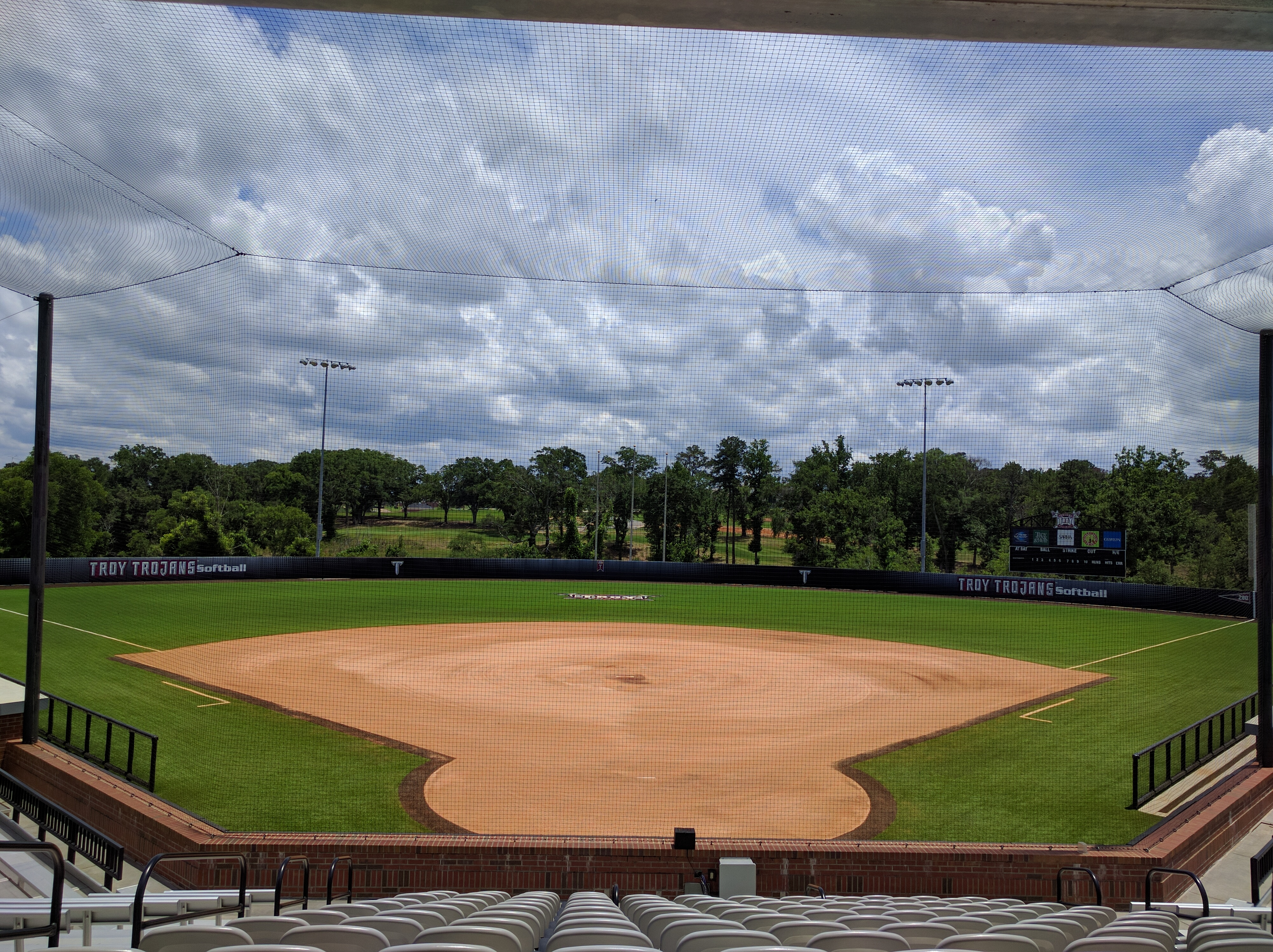
View looking out from the grandstand

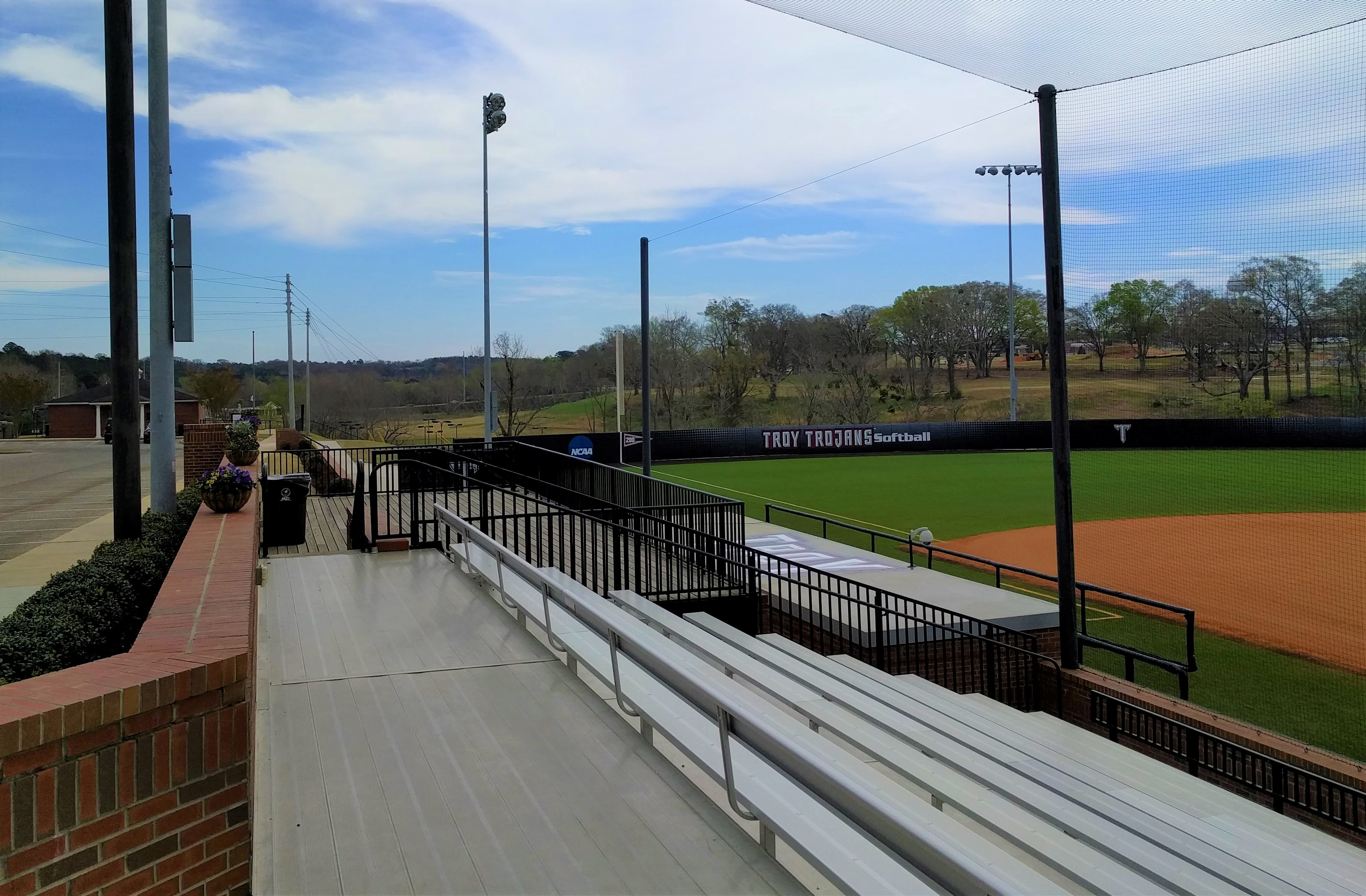
The spectator deck above the home dugout
