= 2019 NCAA Division I softball tournament =

College softball tournament

- Teams: 64
- Finals site: ASA Hall of Fame Stadium; Oklahoma City
- Champions: UCLA (13th NCAA (14th overall) title)
- Runner-up: Oklahoma (13th WCWS Appearance)
- Winning coach: Kelly Inouye-Perez (2nd title)
- MOP: Rachel Garcia (UCLA)
- Attendance: 8,373 (Final game)
- Television: ESPN; ESPN2; ESPN3; SEC Network; Longhorn Network

The 2019 NCAA Division I softball tournament was held from May 31 to June 4, 2019, as the final part of the 2019 NCAA Division I softball season. Thirty-two teams were awarded automatic bids as champions of their conferences, and the remaining 32 were selected at-large by the NCAA Division I softball selection committee. The 64-team, double-elimination tournament concluded with the 2019 Women's College World Series at ASA Hall of Fame Stadium in Oklahoma City. The UCLA Bruins won their 13th championship, defeating the Oklahoma Sooners in two games.

== Bids ==
=== Automatic bids ===
The Big West, Mountain West, Pac-12, and West Coast Conference bids were awarded to the regular-season champion. All other conferences have the automatic bid go to the conference tournament winner.

Conference	School	Best finish	Reference
America East	UMBC	Regionals (2002)	
American	South Florida	WCWS (2012)	
ACC	Florida State	Champions (2018)	
A-10	Fordham	Regionals (2010, 2011, 2013, 2014, 2015, 2016, 2017, 2018)	
ASUN	Lipscomb	Regionals (2010, 2014)	
Big 12	Oklahoma	Champions (2000, 2013, 2016, 2017)	
Big East	DePaul	WCWS (1999, 2000, 2005, 2007)	
Big Sky	Weber State	Regionals (2015, 2016)	
Big South	Longwood	Regionals (2013, 2015, 2016, 2017)	
Big Ten	Michigan	Champions (2005)	
Big West	Cal State Fullerton	Champions (1986)	
Colonial	James Madison	Super Regionals (2016)	
Conference USA	Louisiana Tech	WCWS (1983, 1985, 1986)	
Horizon League	Detroit Mercy	1st Appearance	
Ivy League	Harvard	Regionals (1998, 2000, 2007, 2011, 2012, 2018)	
MAC	Toledo	WCWS (1989)	
MAAC	Monmouth	Regionals (2018)	
MEAC	Bethune–Cookman	Super Regionals (2005)	
MVC	Drake	Regionals (2008, 2018)	
Mountain West	Colorado State	Regionals (1997, 2003)	
Northeast	Saint Francis (PA)	Regionals (2017, 2018)	
OVC	Southeast Missouri State	Regionals (1999)	
Pac-12	UCLA	Champions (1982, 1984, 1985, 1988, 1989, 1990, 1992, 1999, 2003, 2004, 2010)	
Patriot League	Boston University	Regionals (1996, 2002, 2003, 2009, 2010, 2012, 2014, 2016, 2018)	
SEC	Florida	Champions (2014, 2015)	
SoCon	Chattanooga	Regionals (2000, 2001, 2002, 2003, 2004, 2008, 2009, 2011, 2014, 2015)	
Southland	Sam Houston State	Regionals (2007)	
SWAC	Alabama State	Regionals (2016)	
Summit League	North Dakota State	Super Regionals (2009)	
Sun Belt	Louisiana	WCWS (1993, 1995, 1996, 2003, 2008, 2014)	
WAC	Seattle	1st Appearance	
West Coast	BYU	Super Regionals (2010)	

=== At-large ===
Team	Conference
Alabama	SEC
Arizona	Pac-12
Arizona State	Pac-12
Arkansas	SEC
Auburn	SEC
Boise State	Mountain West
Georgia	SEC
Houston	American
Illinois	Big Ten
Kentucky	SEC
LSU	SEC
Louisville	ACC
Minnesota	Big Ten
Mississippi State	SEC
Missouri	SEC
North Carolina	ACC
Northwestern	Big Ten
Notre Dame	ACC
Ohio State	Big Ten
Oklahoma State	Big 12
Ole Miss	SEC
South Carolina	SEC
Southern Illinois	Missouri Valley
Stanford	Pac-12
Tennessee	SEC
Texas	Big 12
Texas A&M	SEC
Texas Tech	Big 12
Tulsa	American
Virginia Tech	ACC
Washington	Pac-12
Wisconsin	Big Ten

=== By conference ===
Conference	Total	Schools
SEC	13	Alabama, Arkansas, Auburn, Florida, Georgia, Kentucky, LSU, Mississippi State, Missouri, Ole Miss, South Carolina, Tennessee, Texas A&M
Big Ten	6	Illinois, Michigan, Minnesota, Northwestern, Ohio State, Wisconsin
ACC	5	Florida State, Louisville, North Carolina, Notre Dame, Virginia Tech
Pac-12	5	Arizona, Arizona State, Stanford, UCLA, Washington
Big 12	4	Oklahoma, Oklahoma State, Texas, Texas Tech
American	3	Houston, South Florida, Tulsa
Missouri Valley	2	Drake, Southern Illinois
Mountain West	2	Boise State, Colorado State
America East	1	UMBC
Atlantic Sun	1	Lipscomb
Atlantic 10	1	Fordham
Big East	1	DePaul
Big Sky	1	Weber State
Big South	1	Longwood
Big West	1	Cal State Fullerton
Colonial	1	James Madison
Conference USA	1	Louisiana Tech
Horizon	1	Detroit Mercy
Ivy	1	Harvard
MAAC	1	Monmouth
Mid-American	1	Toledo
Mid-Eastern	1	Bethune–Cookman
Northeast	1	Saint Francis (PA)
Ohio Valley	1	Southeast Missouri State
Patriot	1	Boston University
SoCon	1	Chattanooga
Southland	1	Sam Houston State
Southwestern	1	Alabama State
Sun Belt	1	Louisiana
Summit	1	North Dakota State
WAC	1	Seattle
West Coast	1	BYU

== National seeds ==
16 National Seeds were announced on the Selection Show, on Sunday, May 12 at 9 p.m. EDT on ESPN2. The 16 national seeds host the Regionals. Teams in italics advanced to Super Regionals. Teams in bold advance to Women's College World Series.

1. **Oklahoma** (49–2)
2. **UCLA** (46–5)
3. **Washington** (45–7)
4. Florida State (51–8)
5. **Florida** (44–15)
6. **Arizona** (42–12)
7. **Minnesota** (41–12)
8. **Alabama** (52–7)

9. Texas (41–14)
10. LSU (40–16)
11. Ole Miss (37–17)
12. Tennessee (39–14)
13. **Oklahoma State** (39–14)
14. Kentucky (33–22)
15. Michigan (43–11)
16. Northwestern (43–10)

== Regionals and Super Regionals ==
The Regionals were held May 16–20, 2019. The Super Regionals were held May 23–26, 2019.

=== Norman Super Regional ===
Round 1	Round 2
1	**Oklahoma**	**12**
UMBC	0^{(5)}
1	**Oklahoma**	**4**
Wisconsin	0
**Wisconsin**	**4**
Notre Dame	2
Norman Regional – OU Softball Complex
UMBC	0
**Notre Dame**	**2**
**Wisconsin**	**5**
Notre Dame	4
16	**Northwestern**	**15**
Detroit Mercy	1^{(5)}
16	Northwestern	1
**Louisville**	**2**
Southern Illinois	5
**Louisville**	**9**
Evanston Regional – Sharon J. Drysdale Field
Detroit Mercy	1
**Southern Illinois**	**2**
16	**Northwestern**	**8**
Southern Illinois	1

Regional Finals
1	**Oklahoma**	1	**2**
Wisconsin	**2**	0
Louisville	0	3
16	**Northwestern**	**7**	**4**

Super Regionals
1	**Oklahoma**	**3**	**8**	—
16	Northwestern	0	0	—

=== Tuscaloosa Super Regional ===
Round 1	Round 2
8	**Alabama**	**8**
Alabama State	2
8	**Alabama**	**7**
Arizona State	4
Lipscomb	3
**Arizona State**	**4**
Tuscaloosa Regional – Rhoads Stadium
Alabama State	0
**Lipscomb**	**14**^{(5)}
**Arizona State**	**10**^{(6)}
Lipscomb	1
9	Texas	1
**Sam Houston State**	**2**
Sam Houston State	0
**Houston**	**5**
**Houston**	**3**
Texas A&M	1
Austin Regional – Red & Charline McCombs Field
9	**Texas**	**3**^{(8)}
Texas A&M	2
Sam Houston State	0
9	**Texas**	**3**

Regional Finals
8	**Alabama**	**9**	—
Arizona State	8	—
Houston	2	0
9	**Texas**	**5**	**7**

Super Regionals
8	**Alabama**	**3**	5	**8**
9	Texas	0	**7**	5

=== Gainesville Super Regional ===
Round 1	Round 2
5	**Florida**	**3**
Boston University	0
5	**Florida**	**8**^{(5)}
Boise State	0
**Boise State**	**9**
Stanford	1
Gainesville Regional – Katie Seashole Pressly Softball Stadium
Boston University	2
**Stanford**	**13**^{(5)}
**Boise State**	**2**
Stanford	0
12	**Tennessee**	**8**^{(6)}
Longwood	0
12	**Tennessee**	**12**
Ohio State	4
**Ohio State**	**1**
North Carolina	0
Knoxville Regional – Sherri Parker Lee Stadium
Longwood	1
**North Carolina**	**3**
Ohio State	3
**North Carolina**	**5**

Regional Finals
5	**Florida**	**5**	—
Boise State	0	—
12	**Tennessee**	0	**2**
North Carolina	**1**	0

Super Regionals
5	**Florida**	**3**	2	**2**^{(8)}
12	Tennessee	0	**3**^{(9)}	1

=== Tallahassee Super Regional ===
Round 1	Round 2
4	**Florida State**	**8**
Bethune–Cookman	0^{(5)}
4	**Florida State**	**12**^{(5)}
South Florida	1
**South Florida**	**3**
South Carolina	2
Tallahassee Regional – JoAnne Graf Field
Bethune–Cookman	0
**South Carolina**	**10**^{(5)}
South Florida	1
**South Carolina**	**2**^{(10)}
13	**Oklahoma State**	**3**
BYU	1
13	**Oklahoma State**	**13**
Tulsa	10
**Tulsa**	**5**
Arkansas	0
Stillwater Regional – Cowgirl Stadium
**BYU**	**6**
Arkansas	3
**Tulsa**	**6**
BYU	4

Regional Finals
4	**Florida State**	**7**	—
South Carolina	6	—
13	**Oklahoma State**	**2**	—
Tulsa	1	—

Super Regionals
4	Florida State	1	**4**	2
13	**Oklahoma State**	**3**^{(9)}	1	**3**

=== Seattle Super Regional ===
Round 1	Round 2
3	**Washington**	**2**
Fordham	0
3	**Washington**	**6**
Mississippi State	1
Seattle	3
**Mississippi State**	**5**
Seattle Regional – Husky Softball Stadium
Fordham	0
**Seattle**	**1**^{(8)}
**Mississippi State**	**7**
Seattle	3
14	**Kentucky**	**7**
Toledo	2
14	**Kentucky**	**8**
Virginia Tech	1
Illinois	2
**Virginia Tech**	**6**
Lexington Regional – John Cropp Stadium
Toledo	0
**Illinois**	**3**
**Virginia Tech**	**5**
Illinois	1

Regional Finals
3	**Washington**	**8**	—
Mississippi State	0	—
14	**Kentucky**	**11**^{(6)}	—
Virginia Tech	1	—

Super Regionals
3	**Washington**	**3**	**5**	—
14	Kentucky	0	0	—

=== Tucson Super Regional ===
Round 1	Round 2
6	**Arizona**	**5**
Harvard	1
6	**Arizona**	**2**
Auburn	1
Colorado State	5
**Auburn**	**10**
Tucson Regional – Rita Hillenbrand Memorial Stadium
Harvard	0
**Colorado State**	**6**
**Auburn**	**8**^{(5)}
Colorado State	0
11	**Ole Miss**	**12**^{(5)}
Chattanooga	0
11	Ole Miss	0
**Louisiana**	**2**
Southeast Missouri State	2
**Louisiana**	**3**
Oxford Regional – Ole Miss Softball Complex
Chattanooga	1
**Southeast Missouri State**	**2**
11	**Ole Miss**	**10**^{(5)}
Southeast Missouri State	0

Regional Finals
6	**Arizona**	**12**	—
Auburn	3	—
Louisiana	1	4
11	**Ole Miss**	**5**	**5**

Super Regionals
6	**Arizona**	**5**	**9**	—
11	Ole Miss	2	1	—

=== Minneapolis Super Regional ===
Round 1	Round 2
7	**Minnesota**	**3**
North Dakota State	0
7	**Minnesota**	**2**^{(8)}
Georgia	1
Drake	4
**Georgia**	**6**^{(8)}
Minneapolis Regional – Jane Sage Cowles Stadium
North Dakota State	0
**Drake**	**8**^{(5)}
**Georgia**	**7**
Drake	4
10	**LSU**	**2**
Monmouth	0
10	**LSU**	**5**^{(13)}
Texas Tech	4
Louisiana Tech	0
**Texas Tech**	**3**
Baton Rouge Regional – Tiger Park
Monmouth	0
**Louisiana Tech**	**1**
**Texas Tech**	**3**
Louisiana Tech	1

Regional Finals
7	**Minnesota**	**8**	—
Georgia	1	—
10	**LSU**	4	**5**
Texas Tech	**5**	1

Super Regionals
7	**Minnesota**	**5**	**3**	—
10	LSU	3	0	—

=== Los Angeles Super Regional ===
Round 1	Round 2
2	**UCLA**	**6**
Weber State	0
2	**UCLA**	**9**^{(5)}
Missouri	1
Cal State Fullerton	4
**Missouri**	**7**
Los Angeles Regional – Easton Stadium
**Weber State**	**7**
Cal State Fullerton	3
**Missouri**	**7**
Weber State	0
15	**Michigan**	**8**^{(6)}
Saint Francis (PA)	0
15	**Michigan**	**1**^{(12)}
James Madison	0
DePaul	2
**James Madison**	**5**
Ann Arbor Regional – Alumni Field
Saint Francis (PA)	1
**DePaul**	**3**
**James Madison**	**3**
DePaul	0

Regional Finals
2	**UCLA**	1	**13**
Missouri	**5**	1
15	Michigan	0	1
**James Madison**	**3**	**2**

Super Regionals
2	**UCLA**	**6**	**7**	—
James Madison	1	2	—

== Women's College World Series ==
The Women's College World Series was held May 30 through June 4, 2019, in Oklahoma City.

=== Participants ===
School	Conference	Record (conference)	Head coach	WCWS appearances† (including 2019 WCWS)	WCWS best finish†*	WCWS W–L record† (excluding 2019 WCWS)
Alabama	SEC	57–8 (18–6)	Patrick Murphy	12 (last: 2016)	1st (2012)	17–21
Arizona	Pac-12	47–12 (19–5)	Mike Candrea	23 (last: 2010)	1st (1991, 1993, 1994, 1996; 1997, 2001, 2006, 2007)	61–32
Florida	SEC	49–16 (12–12)	Tim Walton	10 (last: 2018)	1st (2014, 2015)	26–16
Minnesota	Big Ten	46–12 (20–2)	Jamie Trachsel	1	—	—
Oklahoma	Big 12	54–3 (18–0)	Patty Gasso	13 (last: 2018)	1st (2000, 2013, 2016, 2017)	29–17
Oklahoma State	Big 12	44–15 (13–5)	Kenny Gajewski	8 (last: 2011)	3rd (1989, 1990, 1993, 1994)	11–14
UCLA	Pac-12	51–6 (20–4)	Kelly Inouye-Perez	29 (last: 2018)	1st (1982, 1984, 1985, 1988, 1989, 1990; 1992, 1999, 2003, 2004, 2010)	98–36
Washington	Pac-12	50–7 (20–4)	Heather Tarr	14 (last: 2018)	1st (2009)	24–21

† = From NCAA Division I Softball Championship Results

=== Bracket ===
Opening Round
1	**Oklahoma**	**3**
8	Alabama	2
5	Florida	1
13	**Oklahoma State**	**2**
8	**Alabama**	**15**
5	Florida	3^{(5)}
3	Washington	1^{(8)}
6	**Arizona**	**3**
7	Minnesota	2
2	**UCLA**	**7**
3	**Washington**	**5**
7	Minnesota	3

Second Round
1	**Oklahoma**	**6**
13	Oklahoma State	1
8	**Alabama**	**2**
6	Arizona	0
6	Arizona	2
2	**UCLA**	**6**
13	Oklahoma State	0
3	**Washington**	**1**

Semifinals
1	**Oklahoma**	0^{(8)}	**7**
8	Alabama	**1**	3
2	**UCLA**	**3**	—
3	Washington	0^{(10)}	—

Championship Series
1	Oklahoma	3	4	—
2	**UCLA**	**16**	**5**	—

=== All-tournament Team ===
The following players were members of the Women's College World Series All-Tournament Team.

Position	Player	School
P	**Rachel Garcia (MOP)**	UCLA
P	Taran Alvelo	Washington
P	Montana Fouts	Alabama
P	Samantha Show	Oklahoma State
2B	Kinsley Washington	UCLA
3B	Sydney Romero	Oklahoma
OF	Jocelyn Alo	Oklahoma
OF	Aaliyah Jordan	UCLA
OF	Nicole Mendes	Oklahoma
OF	Bubba Nickles	UCLA
OF	Sami Reynolds	Washington
U	Bailey Hemphill	Alabama

=== Championship game ===
School	Top Batter	Stats.
UCLA Bruins	Brianna Tautalafua	3-3 HR RBI
Oklahoma Sooners	Sydney Romero	2-3 HR RBI

School	Pitcher	IP	H	R	ER	BB	SO	AB	BF
UCLA Bruins	Rachel Garcia (W)	7.0	8	4	4	3	4	38	33
Oklahoma Sooners	Giselle Juarez (L)	6.2	10	5	5	3	7	38	35

=== Game results ===
Date	Game	Winning team	Score	Losing team	Winning pitcher	Losing pitcher	Save	Notes
May 30	Game 1	UCLA	7–2	Minnesota	Rachel Garcia (25–1)	Amber Fiser (31–8)	–	
May 30	Game 2	Arizona	3–1 ^{(8)}	Washington	Taylor McQuillin (24–7)	Taran Alvelo (25–5)	–	
May 30	Game 3	Oklahoma State	2–1	Florida	Samantha Show (22–8)	Kelly Barnhill (34–13)	–	
May 30	Game 4	Oklahoma	3–2	Alabama	Giselle Juarez (27–1)	Montana Fouts (19–6)	–	
May 31	Game 5	UCLA	6–2	Arizona	Rachel Garcia (26–1)	Taylor McQuillan (24–8)	–	
May 31	Game 6	Oklahoma	6–1	Oklahoma State	Giselle Juarez (28–1)	Samantha Show (22–9)	–	
June 1	Game 7	Washington	5–3	Minnesota	Gabbie Plain (24–2)	Amber Fiser (31–9)	Taran Alvelo (3)	Minnesota eliminated
June 1	Game 8	Alabama	15–3 ^{(5)}	Florida	Sarah Cornell (22–1)	Kelly Barnhill (34–14)	–	Florida eliminated
June 1	Game 9	Washington	1–0	Oklahoma State	Taran Alvelo (26–5)	Samantha Show (22–10)	–	Oklahoma State eliminated
June 1	Game 10	Alabama	2–0	Arizona	Montana Fouts (20–6)	Alyssa Denham (13–6)	–	Arizona eliminated
June 2	Game 11	UCLA	3–0 ^{(10)}	Washington	Rachel Garcia (27–1)	Taran Alvelo (26–5)	–	Washington eliminated
June 2	Game 12	Alabama	1–0 ^{(8)}	Oklahoma	Montana Fouts (21–6)	Giselle Juarez (28–2)	–	
June 2	Game 13	Oklahoma	7–3	Alabama	Mariah Lopez (19–1)	Krystal Goodman (11–1)	–	Alabama eliminated
Finals
June 3	Game 1	UCLA	16–3	Oklahoma	Rachel Garcia (28–1)	Giselle Juarez (28–3)	–	UCLA 1–0
June 4	Game 2	UCLA	5–4	Oklahoma	Rachel Garcia (29–1)	Giselle Juarez (28–4)	–	UCLA wins WCWS

== Record by conference ==
Conference	# of Bids	Record	Win %	RF	SR	WS	NS	F	NC
Pac-12	5	26–9	.743	4	3	3	2	1	1
Big 12	4	22–12	.647	4	3	2	1	1	–
SEC	13	38–31	.551	11	6	2	1	–	–
Big Ten	6	16–13	.552	4	2	1	–	–	–
ACC	5	12–10	.545	5	1	–	–	–	–
CAA	1	4–3	.571	1	1	–	–	–	–
American	3	5–6	.455	1	–	–	–	–	–
Mountain West	2	3–4	.333	1	–	–	–	–	–
Sun Belt	1	2–2	.500	1	–	–	–	–	–
Missouri Valley	2	2–4	.333	–	–	–	–	–	–
Other	22	8–44	.154	–	–	–	–	–	–

The columns RF, SR, WS, NS, F, and NC respectively stand for the Regional Finals, Super Regionals, College World Series Teams, National Semi-Finals, Finals, and National Champion.

== Media coverage ==
=== Radio ===
Westwood One provided nationwide radio coverage of the championship series. It was streamed online at westwoodsports.com, through TuneIn, and on SiriusXM. Ryan Radtke made his softball radio debut and joined returning analyst Leah Amico.

=== Television ===
ESPN held exclusive rights to the tournament. The network aired games across ESPN, ESPN2, ESPNU, SEC Network, and ESPN3. For just the third time in the history of the women's softball tournament, ESPN covered every regional.

==== Broadcast assignments ====
Regionals

- Norman: Pam Ward & Jenny Dalton-Hill
- Evanston: Kevin Fitzgerald & Jennie Ritter
- Austin: Alex Loeb & Megan Willis
- Tuscaloosa: Tiffany Greene & Kayla Braud
- Gainesville: Eric Frede & Madison Shipman
- Knoxville: Jenn Hildreth & Carol Bruggeman
- Stillwater: Melissa Lee & Cheri Kempf
- Tallahassee: Mike Couzens & Erin Miller

Super Regionals

- Norman: Tiffany Greene & Kayla Braud
- Tuscaloosa: Beth Mowins, Jessica Mendoza, & Michele Smith
- Gainesville: Eric Frede & Madison Shipman
- Tallahassee: Courtney Lyle & Amanda Scarborough

Women's College World Series

- Adam Amin, Amanda Scarborough, & Tiffany Greene (afternoons, early Fri)
- Beth Mowins, Jessica Mendoza (Thurs, Fri, Championship series), Michele Smith, & Holly Rowe (evenings minus early Fri)

Regionals

- Seattle: Alex Perlman & Kenzie Fowler
- Lexington: Dave Baker & Francesca Enea
- Oxford: Seth Austin & Missy Dickerson
- Tucson: Beth Mowins & Michele Smith
- Minneapolis: Courtney Lyle & Amanda Scarborough
- Baton Rouge: Matt Schumacker & Leigh Dakich
- Ann Arbor: Mark Neely & Danielle Lawrie
- Los Angeles: Trey Bender & Leah Amico

Super Regionals

- Seattle: Mark Neely, Danielle Lawrie, & Holly Rowe
- Tucson: Mike Couzens & Erin Miller
- Minneapolis: Jenn Hildreth & Carol Bruggeman
- Los Angeles: Pam Ward & Jenny Dalton-Hill

Women's College World Series Finals

- Beth Mowins, Jessica Mendoza, Michele Smith, & Holly Rowe (TV)
- Adam Amin, Amanda Scarborough, Kayla Braud, & Tiffany Greene (ESPN3 Second Screen Experience)
