= Troy Trojans softball =

- 2022 Troy Trojans softball team
- Founded: 1994
- University: Troy University
- Head coach: Eric Newell (4th season)
- Conference: Sun Belt
- Location: Troy, Alabama, US
- Home stadium: Troy Softball Complex (capacity: 800)
- Nickname: Trojans
- Colors: Cardinal, silver, and black

NCAA Tournament appearances
- 1996, 2021

Conference tournament championships
- 1996

Regular-season conference championships
- 2005

The Troy Trojans softball team represents Troy University in NCAA Division I college softball. The team participates in the Sun Belt Conference. The Trojans play their home games at Troy Softball Complex located on the university's campus. The program is one of the Top 50 winningest softball programs in the Division I, and has an overall record of 1,103–731–5 (.601) as of the end of the 2025 season.

== History ==
Upon Troy University's athletics moving all sports to the NCAA's Division I in 1993, the Troy softball program was started that same year and officially began their first season in 1994 under head coach Melanie Davis. Under Davis' leadership, the program immediately became a competitive softball program, finishing their first season in Division I with a 40–13 record, including a 4–3 win over an already prominent program in Georgia Tech.

In just Troy's third season of playing softball (1996), the team managed to make history by winning their first ever conference title and receiving a bid to play in an NCAA Regional. The team finished the season with a 47–22–1 record, winning the Mid-Continent Conference tournament title. The Lady Trojans would receive a bid to play in the NCAA Play-In Series versus Southeast Missouri State, where they would sweep the Redhawks by scores of 3–2 and 1–0. The ladies would then receive a bid to play in the NCAA West Regional as the #4 seed. In their first game against Arizona, the Trojans were outmatched, losing 0–8 to the Wildcats. The Trojans were knocked out of the tournament after dropping a heartbreaker in the Regional's elimination game against South Florida, 5–6.

Melanie Davis would resign as head coach of Troy at the end of the 2014 season, compiling a 780–506–4 record. Under Davis' direction, her Trojans defeated many Top 25 teams and other prominent programs, including Florida State, Louisiana, Auburn, Georgia Tech, Nebraska, Michigan, Ole Miss, and Penn State.

In 2015, Beth Mullins was hired as head coach where she led the Trojans to 208 victories in her eight seasons, 30 or more wins in the last three seasons, and a trip to the 2021 NCAA Tournament, a first in 25 years. Mullins abruptly resigned in March 2022 following medical issues. Assistants Taylor Smartt and Holly Ward finished the season at the helm of the program. On June 2, Troy hired Auburn–Montgomery head coach Eric Newell as the program's third head coach. Newell led the Warhawks to three top 5 finishes in the NCAA Division II and 302 victories with the program.

== Coaches ==
Years	Coach	Record
1994–2014	Melanie Davis	780–506–4
2015–2022	Beth Mullins	208–150
2022	Taylor Smartt & Holly Ward (interim)	31–21
2023–future	Eric Newell	100–65–1

== Attendance Records ==
=== NCAA Top 50 Attendance ===
Year	National Rank	Avg. attendance
2021	45th	189
2019	40th	539
2018	38th	575

=== Highest Game Attendance ===
Below is a list of Troy's top single-game attendance records.

Attendance	Year	Opponent
2,121	2022	Florida State
2,078	2014	Alabama
1,852	2019	Alabama
1,837	2019	Alabama
1,822	2023	Auburn
1,351	2011	Alabama
1,482	2018	Auburn
1,837	2019	Alabama
1,087	2018	Mississippi State
1,067	2019	Maryland
1,025	2008	Alabama

== National Award Winners ==
- Rawlings Gold Glove Award

Libby Baker – 2024

== Facilities ==
The place the Trojans call home is the Troy Softball Complex, built in 2002 on the campus of Troy University. In 2014, the entire complex underwent a $3 million renovation project. The official seating capacity was expanded to 800, with 120 of the seats being chairback seating. The Dodds Center was also built in 2014 during the renovation, which is an 8,000 sq. ft. state-of-the-art facility that houses coaches offices, player lounge, locker rooms, athletic training rooms, pitching area, and indoor batting cages.

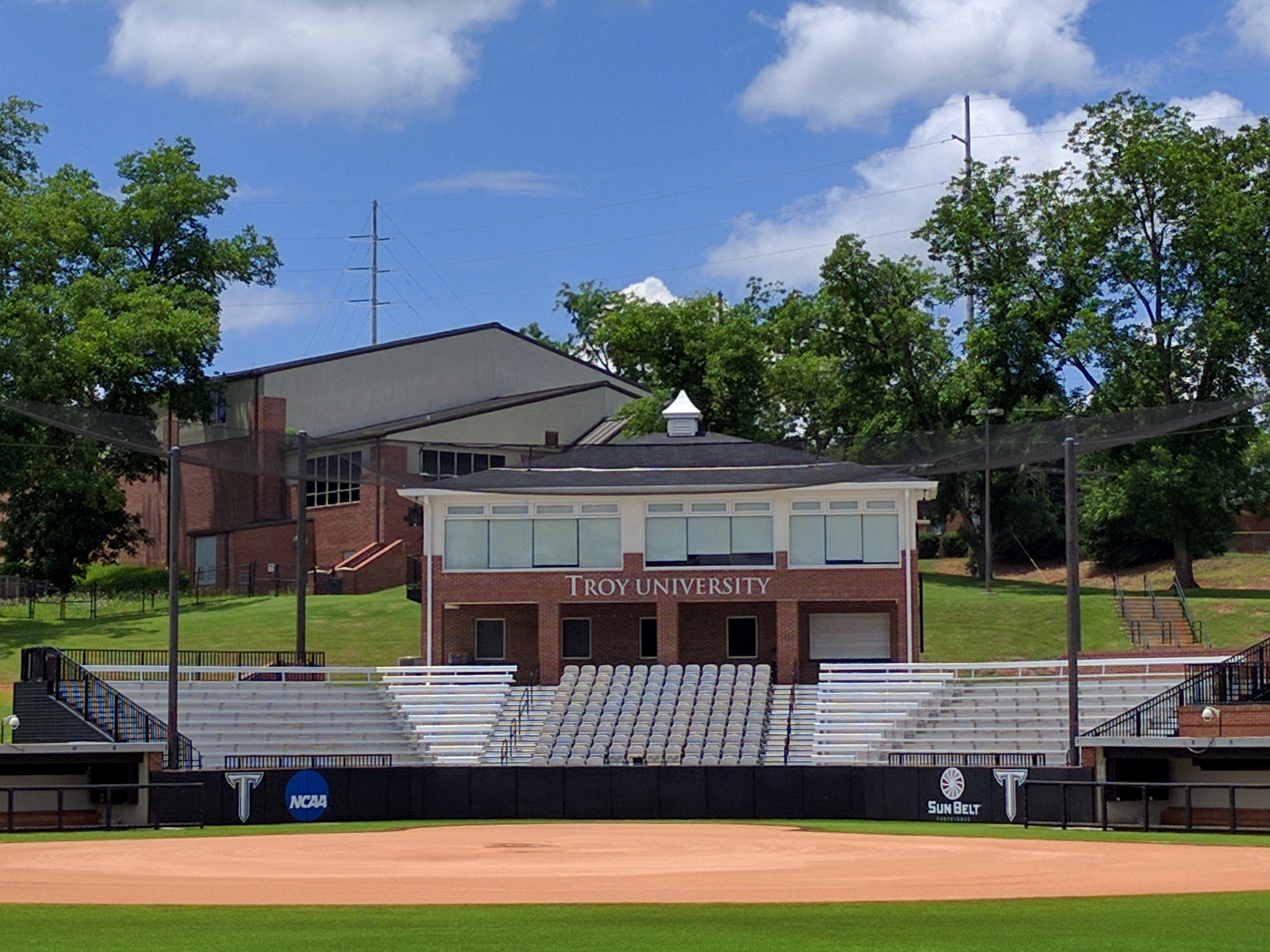
Troy Softball Complex

Additionally, the natural grass playing surface was replaced and ProGrass artificial turf was installed in the outfield. The press box and coaches offices were completely renovated and modernized. The Troy Softball Complex saw an upgrade to the seating areas and a large patio was installed over the visitor's dugout.

== Wins vs. Top 25 ==
Troy has collected 29 wins versus Top 25 ranked competition during the program's relatively short existence.

All-Time Wins Against Top 25
Year	Opponent	Score
1996	#13 Florida State	2–1
1998	#21 Florida State	5–0
2001	#17 Florida State	2–1
2002	#20 Florida State	4–2
2003	#3 Nebraska	4–3
2005	#17 Georgia Tech	8–2
2006	#1 Michigan	4–2
2006	#13 Louisiana	3–2
2007	#21 Louisiana	8–5
2012	#21 Auburn	7–1
2012	#8 Louisiana	9–4
2012	#22 Florida State	4–3
2013	#25 Florida State	6–3
2014	#21 South Alabama	1–0
2015	#10 Florida State	6–4
2015	#7 Louisiana	9–5
2015	#22 South Alabama	6–3
2017	#19 Pittsburgh	7–2
2018	#21 Louisiana	2–1
2018	#21 Texas State	4–3
2018	#21 Texas State	1–0
2020	#16 South Carolina	2–1
2022	#25 Ohio State	4–0
2022	#21 LSU	5–4
2023	#25 Texas State	7–6
2023	#25 Texas State	6–3
2023	#25 Louisiana	8–7
2024	#23 Texas State	4–3
2024	#17 Louisiana	3–0

- All rankings from NFCA Coaches' Poll

== Yearly Results ==
Statistics overview
Season	Coach	Overall	Conference	Standing	Postseason
Troy State (East Coast Conference) (1994–1994)
1994	Melanie Davis	40–13	2–1		—
Troy State (Mid-Continent Conference) (1995–1997)
1995	Melanie Davis	52–18	8–4	2nd (East)	—
1996	Melanie Davis	47–22–1	8–4	2nd (East)	NCAA Regional
1997	Melanie Davis	31–25–1	5–7	3rd (East)	—
Troy State (Atlantic Sun Conference) (1998–2005)
1998	Melanie Davis	46–17	13–4	2nd (West)	—
1999	Melanie Davis	48–23	13–3	1st (West)	—
2000	Melanie Davis	34–30	8–6	T-3rd	—
2001	Melanie Davis	38–23	7–7	6th	—
2002	Melanie Davis	46–20	13–5	2nd	—
2003	Melanie Davis	39–23	16–6	2nd	—
2004	Melanie Davis	35–30	15–5	3rd	—
2005	Melanie Davis	47–21	17–3	1st	—
Troy (Sun Belt Conference) (2006–Present)
2006	Melanie Davis	31–40	5–10	5th	—
2007	Melanie Davis	42–20	17–10	3rd	—
2008	Melanie Davis	33–23	14–10	3rd	—
2009	Melanie Davis	38–19	15–8	3rd	—
2010	Melanie Davis	27–29	10–13	6th	—
2011	Melanie Davis	32–27	11–12	5th	—
2012	Melanie Davis	31–24	10–14	6th	—
2013	Melanie Davis	21–32	7–14	4th	—
2014	Melanie Davis	22–30–2	5–13	7th	—
Melanie Davis:		780–509–4	219–159		
2015	Beth Mullins	32–23	14–9	4th	—
2016	Beth Mullins	31–25	11–13	6th	—
2017	Beth Mullins	20–34	8–19	9th	—
2018	Beth Mullins	34–26	14–13	5th	—
2019	Beth Mullins	37–20	19–8	2nd	—
2020	Beth Mullins	17–6	1–2	T-2nd	Season Canceled
2021	Beth Mullins	37–17	17–6	3rd	NCAA Regional
Beth Mullins:		208–150	87–70		
2022	Taylor Smartt; Holly Ward	31–21	15–12	4th	—
Taylor Smartt & Holly Ward:		31–21	15–12		
2023	Eric Newell	33–19–1	14–9–1	4th	—
2024	Eric Newell	34–22	13–11	5th	—
2025	Eric Newell	33–24	12–12	8th	—
Eric Newell:		100–65–1	39–32–1		
Total:		1,103–731–5			
National champion Postseason invitational champion Conference regular season champion Conference regular season and conference tournament champion Division regular season champion Division regular season and conference tournament champion Conference tournament champion

== Championships ==
- 1996 – Mid-Continent Conference tournament champions
- 1999 – Atlantic Sun Conference West Division champions
- 2005 – Atlantic Sun Conference regular-season champions

== NCAA Regional Results ==
Year	Record	Regional	Results
1996	2–0	NCAA Play-In Series	W 3–2 vs. Southeast Missouri State; W 1–0 vs. Southeast Missouri State
1996	0–2	Midwest Regional	L 0–8 vs. Arizona; L 5–6 vs. South Florida
2021	0–0	Tuscaloosa Regional	L 0–8 vs. Clemson; W 8–0 vs. Alabama State; L 2–4 vs. Clemson
Totals	3–4	2 Appearances	
