= 2026 Mid-American Conference softball tournament =

College softball tournament in Ohio

- Teams: 6
- Format: Double-elimination tournament
- Finals site: Firestone Stadium; Akron, Ohio
- Champions: Akron (1st title)
- Winning coach: Craig Nicholson (1st title)
- MVP: Madie Jamrog (Akron)
- Television: ESPN+

2026 Mid-American Conference softball standings
	Conf.				Overall
Team	W		L	PCT	W		L	PCT
Akron ‍†‍‡‍^{y}	21	–	6	.778	34	–	23	.596
Northern Illinois ‍‍‍	18	–	7	.720	25	–	18	.581
Miami (OH) ‍‍‍	19	–	8	.704	38	–	18	.679
Ohio ‍‍‍	17	–	10	.630	38	–	20	.655
Central Michigan ‍‍‍	15	–	11	.577	25	–	24	.510
Western Michigan ‍‍‍	15	–	12	.556	29	–	26	.527
Toledo ‍‍‍	11	–	16	.407	15	–	35	.300
Ball State ‍‍‍	10	–	17	.370	23	–	25	.479
Buffalo ‍‍‍	10	–	17	.370	24	–	32	.429
UMass ‍‍‍	10	–	17	.370	19	–	30	.388
Kent State ‍‍‍	8	–	19	.296	20	–	30	.400
Bowling Green ‍‍‍	6	–	20	.231	20	–	29	.408
† – Conference champion ‡ – Tournament champion y – Invited to the NCAA tournament As of May 9, 2026; Rankings from NFCA/USA Today

The 2026 Mid-American Conference softball tournament was held at Firestone Stadium in Akron, Ohio from May 6 through May 9, 2026. The tournament was won by the Akron Zips, who earned the Mid-American Conference's automatic bid to the 2026 NCAA Division I softball tournament.

== Format and seeding ==
The top six finishers of the league's twelve teams from the regular season qualified for the tournament. The top two seeds received a single bye, with the remaining teams playing opening round games.

== Tournament ==
Upper round 1	Upper round 2	Upper final	Final
1	Akron	6
4	Ohio	9	4	Ohio	5
5	Central Michigan	3	1	Akron	4
6	Western Michigan	2
2	Northern Illinois	3
3	Miami (OH)	4	6	Western Michigan	8^{(8)}
6	Western Michigan	7
1	Akron	3	—
6	Western Michigan	1	—
Lower round 1	Lower round 2	Lower round 3	Lower final
4	Ohio	6
4	Ohio	15	6	Western Michigan	7
5	Central Michigan	13	2	Northern Illinois	5
5	Central Michigan	7	4	Ohio	15
3	Miami (OH)	3

== All Tournament Team ==
Player	Team
Katie Cantrell	Akron
Haley Glass	Akron
**Madie Jamrog**	Akron
Meagan Lee	Akron
London Williams	Central Michigan
Colleen Bare	Ohio
Belle Hummel	Ohio
Izzie Wilson	Ohio
Bella Duncan	Western Michigan
Caitlin Tighe	Western Michigan

MVP in bold
