= Mid-American Conference softball tournament =

- Conference softball championship
- Sport: Softball
- Conference: Mid-American Conference
- Number of teams: 4
- Format: Double-elimination
- Current stadium: Firestone Stadium
- Current location: Akron, Ohio
- Played: 1982–1986; 1996–2020; 2022–present
- Last contest: 2026
- Current champion: Akron (1)
- Most championships: Central Michigan (10)
- Official website: getsomemaction.com/feature/softball-championship

Host stadiums
- Campus sites (1982–1986; 1996–2001; 2022–2023); Firestone Stadium (2002–2005; 2008–2019; 2024–present); Currie Stadium (2006–2007)

The Mid-American Conference softball tournament is the conference softball championship of the Mid-American Conference, a Division I member of the National Collegiate Athletic Association (NCAA). The top four finishers participate in the double-elimination tournament, which is held at the home field of the regular-season champion. The winner of the tournament receives an automatic berth to the NCAA Division I softball championship.

The tournament began in 1982, but was discontinued after 1986. It resumed in 1996 and was held annually through 2019. It was scheduled to be played in May 2020, but was cancelled in March 2020 due to the coronavirus pandemic. As part of several changes announced in May 2020 related to the pandemic, the tournament was eliminated along with the post-season tournaments of seven other sports, for at least four seasons. This was later reversed in May 2021, when the conference announced all previously canceled tournaments would be returning for the 2021–22 season. The softball tournament resumed in 2022 with a new format, reducing the number of participating teams to the top four from the regular season, with the tournament hosted by the top seed. Beginning in 2024, the tournament will return to being hosted at a neutral location. Central Michigan have won the most tournament titles with 10, followed by Miami with 8.

== History ==
The Mid-American Conference added softball as a varsity sport for the 1982 season, but regular-season conference play did not begin until 1983. The first tournament in 1982 featured all ten conference members, with two rounds of single-elimination play, followed by double-elimination rounds with the final four teams. The following year, 1983, it became a double-elimination tournament featuring the top six teams in conference play, then was reduced to the top four teams for the 1984, 1985, and 1986 tournaments. This format remained in place when the tournament was resumed in 1996 and again in 1997. From 1998 through 2004, the format was expanded to include the top six teams in conference play, and since 2005 it has included the top eight teams.

From the 1983 tournament through 2001, all rounds were held at the home field of the regular-season overall conference champion, with the inaugural 1982 tournament being held at Ebert Field on the campus of Western Michigan University. Beginning in 2002, the tournament was held at Firestone Stadium in Akron, Ohio, where it was held through 2005. After two seasons at Currie Stadium in Midland, Michigan, the tournament returned to Firestone Stadium in 2008, where it remained until the tournament was eliminated. When the tournament resumed in 2022, it was again held at the site of the regular-season champion for 2022 and 2023 before returning to Firestone Stadium in 2024.

== Champions ==
=== By year ===
The following is a list of tournament champions and sites listed by year.

Year	Team champion	Site	Most Valuable Player
1982	Central Michigan	Ebert Field • Kalamazoo, Michigan	—
1983	Central Michigan	Varsity Field • Ypsilanti, Michigan	—
1984	Western Michigan	Ebert Field • Kalamazoo, Michigan	—
1985	Central Michigan	Scott Park Softball Complex • Toledo, Ohio	—
1986	Central Michigan	Scott Park Softball Complex • Toledo, Ohio	—
No tournament held, 1987–1995
1996	No champion	Buchtel Field • Akron, Ohio	—
1997	Central Michigan	Margo Jonker Stadium • Mount Pleasant, Michigan	Amy Daugherty (Western Michigan)
1998	Ball State	Buchtel Field • Akron, Ohio	Heather Hinkle (Ball State)
1999	Central Michigan	Bell Field • DeKalb, Illinois	Tina Kinney (Central Michigan)
2000	Central Michigan	Bell Field • DeKalb, Illinois	Hope Robertson (Central Michigan)
2001	Central Michigan	Margo Jonker Stadium • Mount Pleasant, Michigan	Hope Robertson (Central Michigan)
2002	Central Michigan	Firestone Stadium • Akron, Ohio	Amber Puchalski (Central Michigan); Karly McCormack (Central Michigan)
2003	Western Michigan	Firestone Stadium • Akron, Ohio	Jackie Poggendorf (Miami)
2004	Bowling Green	Firestone Stadium • Akron, Ohio	Jody Johnson (Bowling Green)
2005	Miami	Firestone Stadium • Akron, Ohio	Jackie Poggendorf (Miami)
2006	Kent State	Currie Stadium • Midland, Michigan	Brittany Robinson (Kent State)
2007	Eastern Michigan	Currie Stadium • Midland, Michigan	Lindsay Schmid (Eastern Michigan)
2008	Kent State	Firestone Stadium • Akron, Ohio	Jamie Fitzpatrick (Kent State)
2009	Miami	Firestone Stadium • Akron, Ohio	Jessica Simpson (Miami)
2010	Ball State	Firestone Stadium • Akron, Ohio	Elizabeth Milian (Ball State)
2011	Western Michigan	Firestone Stadium • Akron, Ohio	Meredith Whitney (Western Michigan)
2012	Miami	Firestone Stadium • Akron, Ohio	Jessica Simpson (Miami)
2013	Central Michigan	Firestone Stadium • Akron, Ohio	Kara Dornbos (Central Michigan)
2014	Ohio	Firestone Stadium • Akron, Ohio	Savannah Jo Dorsey (Ohio)
2015	Ball State	Firestone Stadium • Akron, Ohio	Hanne Stuedemann (Ball State)
2016	Miami	Firestone Stadium • Akron, Ohio	Amber Logemann (Miami)
2017	Kent State	Firestone Stadium • Akron, Ohio	Ronnie Ladines (Kent State)
2018	Ohio	Firestone Stadium • Akron, Ohio	Danielle Stiene (Ohio)
2019	Toledo	Firestone Stadium • Akron, Ohio	Erin Hunt (Toledo)
2020	Cancelled due to the coronavirus pandemic		
No tournament held in 2021
2022	Miami	Miami Softball Stadium • Oxford, Ohio	Brianna Pratt (Miami)
2023	Miami	Miami Softball Stadium • Oxford, Ohio	Karli Spaid (Miami)
2024	Miami	Firestone Stadium • Akron, Ohio	Karli Spaid (Miami)
2025	Miami	Firestone Stadium • Akron, Ohio	Chloe Parks (Miami)
2026	Akron	Firestone Stadium • Akron, Ohio	Madie Jamrog (Akron)

=== By school ===
The following is a list of tournament champions listed by school and the years each team was eligible to play in the tournament.

Program	Tenure	Titles	Title years
Central Michigan	1982–1986; 1996–2020; 2022–present	10	1982, 1983, 1985, 1986, 1997, 1999, 2000, 2001, 2002, 2013
Miami	1982–1986; 1996–2020; 2022–present	8	2005, 2009, 2012, 2016, 2022, 2023, 2024, 2025
Ball State	1982–1986; 1996–2020; 2022–present	3	1998, 2010, 2015
Kent State	1982–1986; 1996–2020; 2022–present	3	2006, 2008, 2017
Western Michigan	1982–1986; 1996–2020; 2022–present	3	1984, 2003, 2011
Ohio	1982–1986; 1996–2020; 2022–present	2	2014, 2018
Akron	1996–2020; 2022–present	1	2026
Bowling Green	1982–1986; 1996–2020; 2022–present	1	2004
Toledo	1982–1986; 1996–2020; 2022–present	1	2019
Buffalo	2001–2020; 2022–present	0	
UMass	2026–present	0	
Eastern Michigan	1982–1986; 1996–2018	1	2007
Marshall	1996–2005	0	
Northern Illinois	1982–1986; 1998–2020; 2022–2026	0	

Former conference members shaded in ██ silver
