= 2015 Mid-American Conference softball tournament =

- Teams: 8
- Format: Double-elimination tournament
- Finals site: Firestone Stadium; Akron, Ohio
- Television: mac-sports.com

The 2015 Mid-American Conference (MAC) softball tournament was held at Firestone Stadium in Akron, Ohio, from May 6 through May 9, 2015. The tournament winner will earn the Mid-American Conference's automatic bid to the 2015 NCAA Division I softball tournament. All games will be streamed via mac-sports.com.

== Tournament ==
Upper round 1	Upper round 2	Upper final	Final
1	Kent State	3
8	Ohio	1
1	Kent State	0
4	Central Michigan	1
4	Central Michigan	2
5	Western Michigan	0
4	Central Michigan	2
2	Ball State	3^{(8)}
2	Ball State	10
7	Akron	2^{(6)}
2	Ball State	8
3	Miami (OH)	5
3	Miami (OH)	6
6	Northern Illinois	4	2	Ball State	11	–
5	Western Michigan	3	–
Lower round 1	Lower round 2	Lower round 3	Lower final
3	Miami (OH)	4
5	Western Michigan	10	5	Western Michigan	5	4	Central Michigan	0
8	Ohio	2^{(5)}	5	Western Michigan	8	5	Western Michigan	7
1	Kent State	3
1	Kent State	3
6	Northern Illinois	5	7	Akron	2^{(8)}
7	Akron	9

- All times listed are Eastern Daylight Time.
