= Kent State Golden Flashes softball =

College softball team

- University: Kent State University
- Head coach: Jessica O'Donnell (1st season)
- Conference: MAC; East Division
- Location: Kent, Ohio, US
- Home stadium: Judith K. Devine Diamond (capacity: 500)
- Nickname: Golden Flashes
- Colors: Navy blue and gold

NCAA WCWS appearances
- 1990

NCAA Tournament appearances
- 1990 • 2006 • 2008 • 2017

Conference tournament championships
- 2006 • 2008 • 2017

Regular-season conference championships
- 1990 • 2007 • 2008 • 2010 • 2015 • 2016

The Kent State Golden Flashes softball team is an intercollegiate athletic team at Kent State University in Kent, Ohio, United States. The Flashes play in the National Collegiate Athletic Association (NCAA) at the Division I level as a member of the Mid-American Conference (MAC) East Division. The head coach since the 2016 season is Eric Oakley. Home games are played at the Judith K. Devine Diamond, a 500-seat facility that opened in 1999. The Flashes also have an indoor practice facility, the David and Peggy Edmonds Baseball and Softball Training Facility, which opened in 2014.

The program was established in the mid-1970s along with the women's basketball, women's volleyball, and women's track and field teams as part of the implementation of Title IX. The team began play in 1975 at the club level and had their first varsity game in 1976. The MAC added softball as a sponsored sport in 1982 and conference play began the following year. After a brief use of East and West divisions in 1983 and 1984, divisions were re-introduced in 1998 and Kent State was placed in the East Division. Through the 2017 season, the Flashes have won 10 MAC East Division titles, six MAC regular-season titles, and three MAC tournament championships. Kent State has made four appearances in the NCAA Division I Softball Championship, advancing to the Women's College World Series in 1990.

== History ==
Following the passage of Title IX in 1972, Kent State University began to introduce additional women's intercollegiate sports at the varsity level. Prior to 1972, the only varsity women's athletic teams were the women's gymnastics and women's swimming teams while all other sports were available as intramurals. The women's basketball team was founded in 1973 and received varsity status in 1975, followed by women's volleyball, women's track and field, women's tennis, field hockey, and softball. The softball team played the 1975 season as a club team and began varsity competition in 1976 as a member of the Ohio Association of Intercollegiate Sports for Women (OAISW), where they would play until the Mid-American Conference added softball as a sponsored sport in 1982, with competition beginning in 1983. Kent State's first varsity softball game was an 8–4 win in Youngstown, Ohio, over the Youngstown State Penguins on May 1, 1976, as part of a tournament after having earlier scheduled games cancelled for weather. The Flashes finished the inaugural varsity season 13–3 overall under coach Kirk "Corky" Semier, who coached for just one season. She was succeeded by Laurel Wartluft, who coached the team from 1977 to 1981. Wartluft, who also coached the women's basketball team from 1977 to 1986, led the team to a 21–3 season in 1977, which included the OAISW tournament championship. The team transitioned to fastpitch softball in 1979.

Lori Fuglestad succeeded Wartluft in 1982, the same year the Mid-American Conference added softball as a sponsored sport with regular-season conference play starting the following year. Fuglestad coached four seasons at KSU and was followed by Sue Lilley. Under Lilley, Kent State won their first MAC softball championship in 1990, when the team posted a 20–4 conference record and 43–9 overall mark. The .827 overall winning percentage ranks first in MAC history as of 2016. The 1990 team went 3–0 in the regional round of the NCAA Tournament, where they defeated the Ohio State Buckeyes twice and the Oregon Ducks to advance to the Women's College World Series. At the WCWS, Kent State fell to both UCLA and UNLV to earn a national 7th-place finish. Lilley coached the Flashes through the 1996 season, finishing with a record of 289–219–1 in 11 seasons and the 1990 MAC Coach of the Year award.

Karen Linder began her tenure as head coach for the 1997 season and coached 19 seasons. Under Linder, the team won their first MAC East Division championship ever in 1999, their first MAC Tournament title ever in 2006, and their first regular-season title since 1990 in 2007. In her 19 seasons, Linder led the Flashes to nine MAC East titles, four MAC regular-season championships, and two MAC Tournament titles. In the NCAA Tournament, the Flashes finished 1–2 at the 2006 tournament and 2–2 at the 2008 tournament, advancing to the regional final with wins over Wright State and Notre Dame. The 2008 team went 46–12 overall and 20–2 in MAC play. The 46 wins set the school record for wins and ranks second in MAC history. In 2015 the Flashes again won over 40 games, going 41–13 overall and 17–4 in MAC play, but lost in the MAC Tournament. Linder resigned after the 2015 season citing "philosophical differences with today's athletic world". She finished her career at Kent State with an overall record of 548–434–1 and 269–153 in MAC play. The 548 wins are the most in program history, while the 269 MAC wins are the most in Kent State and MAC history. Linder was also awarded MAC Coach of the Year four times, including her final 2015 season.

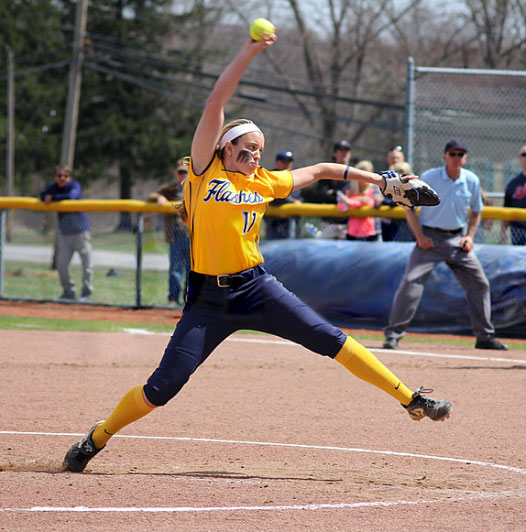
A softball player in 2015

Linder was succeeded by Eric Oakley, who had been serving as assistant for the 2015 season. He officially served as interim head coach for 2016 and led the team to their second-consecutive MAC regular-season and East Division championships with a 37–22 record overall and 16–7 in MAC play. At the conclusion of the MAC Tournament, Oakley was named MAC Coach of the Year, the sixth time a KSU coach has won the award.

On June 21, 2023, former Saint Francis head coach Jessica O'Donnell was announced as the new head coach for the Golden Flashes.

== Postseason ==
Kent State is a regular participant in the Mid-American Conference softball tournament, which was first held in 1982, but was discontinued after 1986 and resumed in 1996. The 1982 tournament featured all 10 conference teams in a single-elimination opening round followed by a double-elimination bracket for the remaining four teams. The 1983 tournaments featured the top six in a double-elimination format, while the 1984, 1985, and 1986 tournaments included only the top four teams in the conference. After the tournament resumed in 1996, the top four qualified for the 1996 and 1997 tournaments before being expanded to include the top six teams from 1998 to 2004. Since 2005, the tournament has included the top eight teams in the conference. Originally, the top seed served as the host for the entire tournament. Since 2002, the tournament has been held at a neutral site, starting at Firestone Stadium in Akron from 2002 to 2005, followed by two years at Currie Stadium in Midland, Michigan. The tournament returned to Firestone Stadium in 2008. Through the 2018 tournament, Kent State has 21 total appearances out of 28 total tournaments. The Flashes won the 2006, 2008, and 2017 tournaments and have an overall record of 35–36.

Mid-American Conference softball tournament
Year	Seed	Location	Round	Result
1982	—	Western Michigan Softball Field • Kalamazoo, Michigan	First	L 2–1 to Northern Illinois
1983	—	Varsity Field • Ypsilanti, Michigan	First	W 4–2 over Western Michigan
1983	—	Varsity Field • Ypsilanti, Michigan	Second	L 8–2 to Miami
1983	—	Varsity Field • Ypsilanti, Michigan	Second	W 9–6 over Ohio
1983	—	Varsity Field • Ypsilanti, Michigan	Second	L 6–2 to Western Michigan
1997	—	CMU Softball Field • Mount Pleasant, Michigan	First	W 3–0 over Central Michigan
1997	—	CMU Softball Field • Mount Pleasant, Michigan	Second	L 2–1 to Western Michigan
1997	—	CMU Softball Field • Mount Pleasant, Michigan	Second	L 1–0 to Central Michigan
1998	—	Buchtel Field • Akron, Ohio	First	L 5–0 to Ball State
1998	—	Buchtel Field • Akron, Ohio	First	W 11–1 (5) over Bowling Green
1998	—	Buchtel Field • Akron, Ohio	Second	W 1–0 (15) over Northern Illinois
1998	—	Buchtel Field • Akron, Ohio	Semifinal	W 4–3 over Central Michigan
1998	—	Buchtel Field • Akron, Ohio	Championship	L 3–1 (8) to Ball State
1999	—	Bell Field • DeKalb, Illinois	First	L 3–0 to Central Michigan
1999	—	Bell Field • DeKalb, Illinois	First	W 2–1 over Bowling Green
1999	—	Bell Field • DeKalb, Illinois	Second	L 2–1 to Northern Illinois
2001	4th	CMU Softball Field • Mount Pleasant, Michigan	First	W 5–4 over (5) Ohio
2001	4th	CMU Softball Field • Mount Pleasant, Michigan	Second	L 4–3 to (1) Central Michigan
2001	4th	CMU Softball Field • Mount Pleasant, Michigan	Second	L 4–0 to (3) Ball State
2004	2nd	Firestone Stadium • Akron, Ohio	First	L 1–0 to (3) Western Michigan
2004	2nd	Firestone Stadium • Akron, Ohio	First	W 6–5 over (5) Ohio
2004	2nd	Firestone Stadium • Akron, Ohio	Second	L 6–0 to (6) Bowling Green
2005	—	Firestone Stadium • Akron, Ohio	First	L 3–2 to Marshall
2005	—	Firestone Stadium • Akron, Ohio	First	L 2–0 to Buffalo
2006	—	Currie Stadium • Midland, Michigan	First	W 2–1 over Northern Illinois
2006	—	Currie Stadium • Midland, Michigan	Second	W 3–2 over Bowling Green
2006	—	Currie Stadium • Midland, Michigan	Semifinal	W 2–0 over Eastern Michigan
2006	—	Currie Stadium • Midland, Michigan	Championship	W 2–1 over Western Michigan
2007	—	Currie Stadium • Midland, Michigan	First	W 4–2 over Northern Illinois
2007	—	Currie Stadium • Midland, Michigan	Second	L 7–6 to Central Michigan
2007	—	Currie Stadium • Midland, Michigan	Second	L 2–1 to Ohio
2008	1st	Firestone Stadium • Akron, Ohio	First	W 3–2 over (8) Akron
2008	1st	Firestone Stadium • Akron, Ohio	Second	W 2–1 over (5) Western Michigan
2008	1st	Firestone Stadium • Akron, Ohio	Semifinal	W 6–3 over (7) Ball State
2008	1st	Firestone Stadium • Akron, Ohio	Championship	W 5–0 over (6) Ohio
2009	2nd	Firestone Stadium • Akron, Ohio	First	W 3–1 over (7) Akron
2009	2nd	Firestone Stadium • Akron, Ohio	Second	L 3–2 to (3) Western Michigan
2009	2nd	Firestone Stadium • Akron, Ohio	Second	L 4–3 to (5) Northern Illinois
2010	1st	Firestone Stadium • Akron, Ohio	First	W 8–0 over (8) Bowling Green
2010	1st	Firestone Stadium • Akron, Ohio	Second	W 4–2 over (4) Central Michigan
2010	1st	Firestone Stadium • Akron, Ohio	Semifinal	L 6–0 to (2) Ball State
2010	1st	Firestone Stadium • Akron, Ohio	Semifinal	W 1–0 over (6) Northern Illinois
2010	1st	Firestone Stadium • Akron, Ohio	Championship	L 5–1 to (2) Ball State
2011	8th	Firestone Stadium • Akron, Ohio	First	L 8–0 to (1) Western Michigan
2011	8th	Firestone Stadium • Akron, Ohio	First	W 5–2 over (5) Eastern Michigan
2011	8th	Firestone Stadium • Akron, Ohio	Second	L 2–1 to (6) Central Michigan
2012	7th	Firestone Stadium • Akron, Ohio	First	L 2–1 to (2) Central Michigan
2012	7th	Firestone Stadium • Akron, Ohio	First	W 9–5 over (4) Ohio
2012	7th	Firestone Stadium • Akron, Ohio	Second	L 5–1 to (2) Miami
2013	2nd	Firestone Stadium • Akron, Ohio	First	L 1–0 to (3) Central Michigan
2013	2nd	Firestone Stadium • Akron, Ohio	First	L 5–4 to (6) Ohio
2014	4th	Firestone Stadium • Akron, Ohio	First	L 2–1 to (5) Ohio
2014	4th	Firestone Stadium • Akron, Ohio	First	W 4–1 over (8) Miami
2014	4th	Firestone Stadium • Akron, Ohio	Second	L 3–1 to (6) Central Michigan
2015	1st	Firestone Stadium • Akron, Ohio	First	W 3–1 over (8) Ohio
2015	1st	Firestone Stadium • Akron, Ohio	Second	L 1–0 to (4) Central Michigan
2015	1st	Firestone Stadium • Akron, Ohio	Second	W 3–2 (8) over (7) Akron
2015	1st	Firestone Stadium • Akron, Ohio	Second	L 8–3 to (5) Western Michigan
2016	1st	Firestone Stadium • Akron, Ohio	First	W 1–0 over (8) Central Michigan
2016	1st	Firestone Stadium • Akron, Ohio	Second	L 2–0 to (4) Northern Illinois
2016	1st	Firestone Stadium • Akron, Ohio	Second	W 13–6 over (6) Akron
2016	1st	Firestone Stadium • Akron, Ohio	Second	L 2–1 to (3) Ohio
2017	4th	Firestone Stadium • Akron, Ohio	First	W 4–1 over (5) Ball State
2017	4th	Firestone Stadium • Akron, Ohio	Second	W 9–3 over (8) Western Michigan
2017	4th	Firestone Stadium • Akron, Ohio	Semifinal	L 2–0 to (2) Ohio
2017	4th	Firestone Stadium • Akron, Ohio	Semifinal	W 9–3 over (3) Northern Illinois
2017	4th	Firestone Stadium • Akron, Ohio	Championship	W 1–0 (8) over (2) Ohio
2017	4th	Firestone Stadium • Akron, Ohio	Championship	W 3–0 over (2) Ohio
2018	4th	Firestone Stadium • Akron, Ohio	First	W 3–2 over (5) Western Michigan
2018	4th	Firestone Stadium • Akron, Ohio	Second	L 3–1 to (1) Ohio
2018	4th	Firestone Stadium • Akron, Ohio	Second	L 4–2 to (2) Ball State
Totals: 5 championship round appearances, 3 titles, 35–36 record in tournament

=== NCAA tournament ===
The Golden Flashes have made four appearances in the NCAA Division I Softball Championship as of 2017, the most recent being in 2017. Kent State has one appearance in the Women's College World Series and an overall record of 7–8 in the tournament.

NCAA Division I Softball Championship
Year	Seed	Location	Round	Result
1990	—	Buckeye Field • Columbus, Ohio	Regional	W 4–0 over Ohio State
1990	—	Buckeye Field • Columbus, Ohio	Regional	W 3–0 over Oregon
1990	—	Buckeye Field • Columbus, Ohio	Regional	W 5–3 over Ohio State
1990	—	ASA Hall of Fame Stadium • Oklahoma City	Women's College World Series	L 4–0 to UCLA
1990	—	ASA Hall of Fame Stadium • Oklahoma City	Women's College World Series	L 5–2 to UNLV
2006	3rd	Alumni Field • Ann Arbor, Michigan	Regional	L 1–0 to (2) Oklahoma
2006	3rd	Alumni Field • Ann Arbor, Michigan	Regional	W 8–0 over (4) Youngstown State
2006	3rd	Alumni Field • Ann Arbor, Michigan	Regional	L 9–1 to (2) Oklahoma
2008	3rd	Alumni Field • Ann Arbor, Michigan	Regional	L 9–1 to (2) Notre Dame
2008	3rd	Alumni Field • Ann Arbor, Michigan	Regional	W 3–2 over (4) Wright State
2008	3rd	Alumni Field • Ann Arbor, Michigan	Regional	W 7–5 over (2) Notre Dame
2008	3rd	Alumni Field • Ann Arbor, Michigan	Regional	L 5–0 to (1) Michigan
2017	—	Getternam Stadium • Waco, Texas	Regional	L 1–0 to (15) Baylor
2017	—	Getternam Stadium • Waco, Texas	Regional	W 2–1 over Oregon State
2017	—	Getternam Stadium • Waco, Texas	Regional	L 4–0 to James Madison
Totals: 4 tournament appearances, 1 regional title, 7–8 record in tournament

== Coaches ==
Through the 2017 season, Kent State has had six head coaches. The program's first varsity head coach, Kirk Semler, who graduated from Kent State in 1975 and was a member of the KSU men's swimming team, also coached the women's swimming team in 1976 and served as an assistant to the men's swimming team. Laurel Wartluft, who succeeded Semler in 1977, served as women's basketball coach during her tenure as softball coach.

Coach	Years	Seasons	Overall		MAC		MAC championships			NCAA
Coach	Years	Seasons	Win–loss–tie	Percent	Win–loss–tie	Percent	East Division	Overall	Tournament	NCAA
Kirk "Corky" Semler	1976	1	13–3	.813	—	—	—	—	—	—
Laurel Wartluft	1977–1981	5	85–58	.594	—	—	—	—	—	—
Lori Fuglestad	1982–1985	4	77–86–1	.473	16–25–1	.393	—	—	—	—
Sue Lilley Nevar	1986–1996	11	289–219–1	.569	157–134–1	.539	—	1990	—	Regional: 1990; WCWS: 1990
Karen Linder	1997–2015	19	548–434–1	.558	269–153	.637	1999, 2004, 2006, 2007, 2008, 2009, 2010, 2013, 2015	2007, 2008, 2010, 2015	2006, 2008	Regional: 2006, 2008
Eric Oakley	2016–present	3	99–73	.576	45–25	.643	2016	2016	2017	Regional: 2017
6 coaches		43 seasons	1,111–877–3	.559	485–337–2	.590	10 MAC East titles	6 MAC titles	3 MAC Tournament titles	4 regional 1 WCWS appearances

== Facilities ==
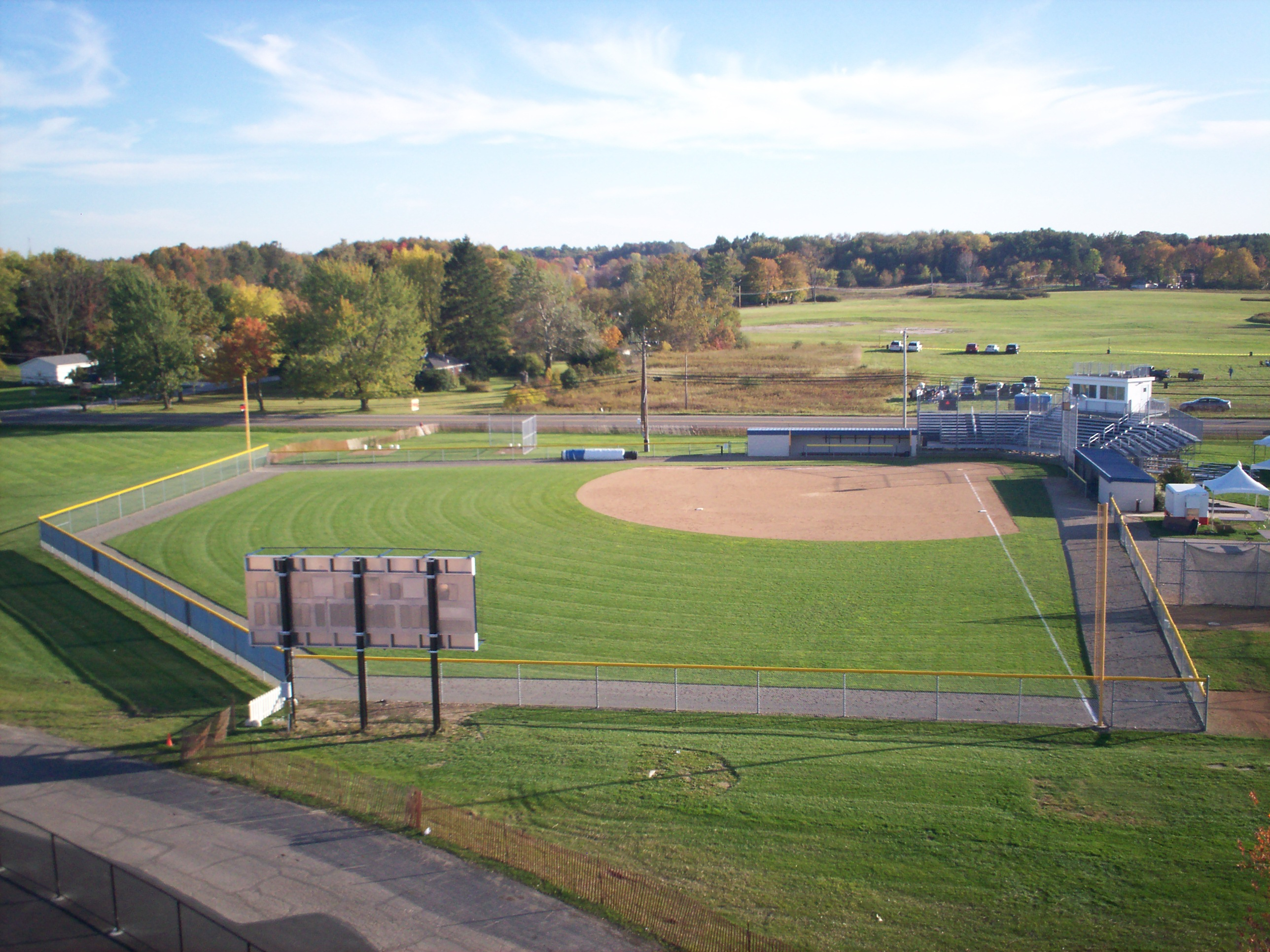
Diamond at Dix, 2008

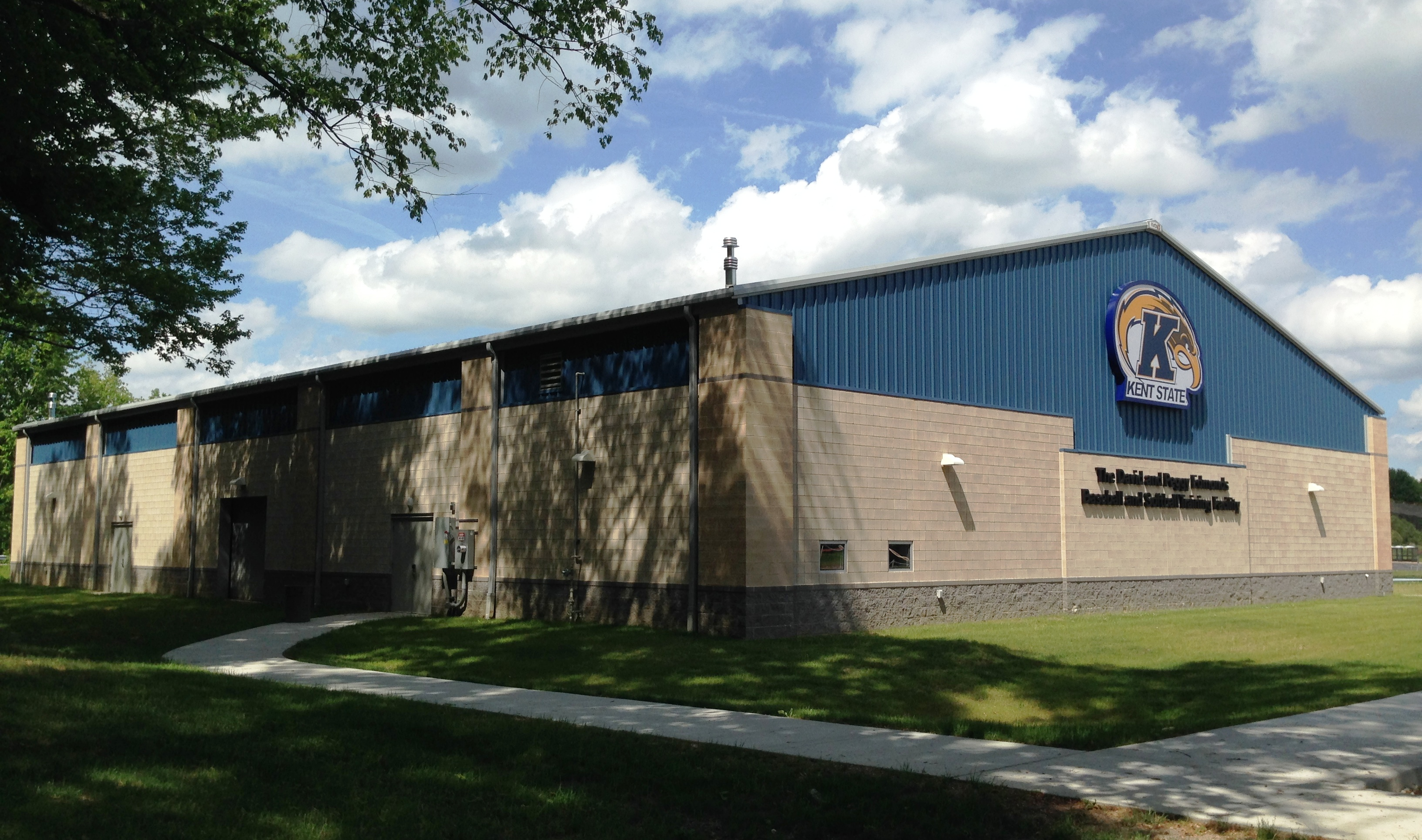
David and Peggy Edmonds Baseball and Softball Training Facility, 2015

Home games are played at the Judith K. Devine Diamond, which opened in 1999. It is located along Summit Street adjacent to the southwest corner of Dix Stadium on the eastern edge of the Kent State University campus. The facility features bleacher seating for 500 fans, dugouts, bullpens, a press box, and batting cages. The stadium was renovated in 2004 and a new scoreboard was installed in 2008. The field is natural grass with dimensions that are deeper in the power alleys. This is due to an angled outfield fence instead of a typical curved fence. The field was built adjacent to Dix Stadium to allow use of the locker rooms by players and the restroom facilities by fans. It opened as the Kent Softball Field on April 2, 1999 with a doubleheader against Western Michigan. Kent State swept the doubleheader, winning the first game 2–1 in extra innings, followed by a 6–0 win. Through the 2016 season, Kent State has an overall record of 166–70 (.703) at Judith K. Devine Diamond. It was known as the Diamond at Dix from its opening in 1999 through the 2021 season. It was announced on March 9, 2022, that it was renamed for Judith K. Devine, who served in multiple KSU athletics administrator and coaching positions, in particular as the first female head coach of the Kent State women's basketball team.

Judith K. Devine Diamond is the second permanent home for the team, but the fifth field they have called home. When the program was first established in 1975, they played at what was known as University Field in the area north of the Memorial Athletic and Convocation Center. This area was used for construction of the adjacent MACC Annex beginning in 1977, so from 1977 through 1981, the team played off campus at Fred Fuller Park in Kent. The 1981 season was initially scheduled to be at the new Campus Center Drive Field, but the team stayed at Fred Fuller for an additional year and then moved to Triple D Field in Brimfield for the 1982 season. In 1983, the team moved to their first permanent home, Campus Center Drive Field, where they played from 1983 to 1997. It was located along Campus Center Drive just north of Schoonover Stadium, and was built in 1979. The site of the field is now part of the parking lot for the adjacent Student Recreation and Wellness Center, which opened in 1999. For the 1998 season, the team used one of the softball fields at the nearby Allerton Sports Complex while the Diamond at Dix was under construction.

The David and Peggy Edmonds Baseball and Softball Training Facility, which opened in 2014, is the team's indoor facility, providing areas for weight training, batting practice, and meetings. It is adjacent to Schoonover Stadium, home of the baseball team. Plans call for construction of a new softball field and clubhouse adjacent to the facility in the near future. Prior to the opening of the current facility, the team used the Kent State Field House, which they shared with a number of other Kent State athletic teams.

== Rivalries ==
Current Mid-American Conference teams (through 2026)
Team	Meetings	Wins–losses	Percentage	Streak
Akron	140	85–54–1	.611	L5
Ball State	99	54–44	.551	L6
Bowling Green	133	82–50	.621	W3
Buffalo	52	36–16	.692	W1
Central Michigan	106	51–55	.481	L4
Eastern Michigan	84	51–33	.607	W2
Massachusetts	5	5–0	1.000	W5
Miami	127	54–76	.415	L9
Ohio	133	73–63	.537	L7
Toledo	111	67–43	.609	W1
Western Michigan	100	60–40	.600	W1
Non-conference rivals
Cleveland State	59	44–15	.737	W4
Youngstown State	71	56–15	.789	W4

The Flashes arch-rivals are the Akron Zips from the University of Akron, located in Akron, Ohio, approximately 10 miles (16 km) to the southwest of Kent. The two teams first played in 1975 when both programs were at the club level. Kent State records the first official meeting as May 1, 1976, a 3–2 Zips win in Youngstown, while Akron records have the first meeting as April 5, 1980, a 3–2 Zips win in Kent. As a result of the two different start years, through the 2026 season, Akron has the series at 78–52–1 in favor of the Flashes, while Kent State lists the series at 85–54–1 in favor of KSU, beginning in 1976. Akron joined the Mid-American Conference in 1993 and both teams were placed in the East Division in 1998. Akron's longest winning streak in the series came in the 1997 and 1998 seasons, when they won seven in a row, while Kent State recorded a 12-game winning streak that spanned from the 2006 season through the 2012 season. The teams have met four times in the MAC Tournament, with Kent State winning all four: 3–2 in 2008, 3–1 in 2009, 3–2 in 2015, and 13–6 in 2016. Since 2012, the games have also counted as part of the larger Wagon Wheel Challenge between the two schools.

In the MAC, Kent State's most common opponents are the Bowling Green Falcons and Ohio Bobcats at 133 meetings, and the Miami RedHawks at 127. Through the 2026 season, Kent State leads the series with Bowling Green 82–50 and the series with Ohio 73–63. Miami leads the series with Kent State 76–54.

Outside the MAC, Kent State's most common opponents are nearby Northeast Ohio teams the Cleveland State Vikings from Cleveland State University and the Youngstown State Penguins of Youngstown State University, both of the Horizon League. Kent State has played both the Vikings and Penguins regularly since the Flashes' first varsity season in 1976. Through the 2026 season, Kent State has met Cleveland State 59 times and leads the Vikings 44–15 following a Kent State win in Cleveland. The Flashes and Penguins have met 71 times through 2026, with Kent State leading the series 56–15 after sweeping a doubleheader in Kent. The Penguins and Flashes have met once in the NCAA Tournament, with Kent State winning 8–0 in 2008 at Ann Arbor, Michigan.

== Awards ==
MAC Coach of the Year
Name	Year
Sue Lilley	1990
Karen Linder	2004, 2008, 2010, 2015
Eric Oakley	2016

MAC Pitcher of the Year
Name	Year
Brittney Robinson	2006
Kylie Reynolds	2007, 2008, 2010
Emma Johnson	2013, 2015
MAC Freshman of the Year
Jamie Kraus	1998
Kylie Reynolds	2007

MAC Player of the Year
Name	Year
Lisa Veneziano	1993
Carla Brookbank	1995
Jessica Toocheck	2008
Holly Spears	2018

All-American
Name	Year	Team
Holly Spears	2018	National Fastpitch Coaches Association (NFCA) First Team
