= Heřmánek =

Heřmánek (feminine Heřmánková) is a Czech surname. Notable people with the surname include:

- Jan Heřmánek (1907–1978), Czech boxer
- Jodi Hermanek, American softball coach
- Karel Heřmánek (1947–2024), Czech actor
