= 1988 UCLA Bruins softball team =

American college softball season

1988 UCLA Bruins softball

National Champion NCAA Northwest Regional champion
- Conference: Pacific-10 Conference
- Record: 53–8 (15–3 Pac-10)
- Head coach: Sharron Backus (14th season)
- Home stadium: Sunset Field

1988 Pacific-10 Conference softball standings
	Conf.				Overall
Team	W		L	PCT	W		L	PCT
UCLA ‍†‍‍^{y}	15	–	3	.833	53	–	8	.869
Arizona ‍‍‍^{y}	15	–	5	.750	54	–	18	.750
Oregon ‍‍‍	9	–	11	.450	32	–	26	.552
Arizona State ‍‍‍	8	–	12	.400	26	–	25	.510
California ‍‍‍^{y}	7	–	11	.389	38	–	22	.633
Oregon State ‍‍‍	2	–	14	.125	13	–	32	.289
† – Conference champion y – Invited to the NCAA tournament

The 1988 UCLA Bruins softball team represented the University of California, Los Angeles in the 1988 NCAA Division I softball season. The Bruins were coached by Sharron Backus, who led her fourteenth season. The Bruins played their home games at Sunset Field and finished with a record of 53–8. They competed in the Pacific-10 Conference, where they finished first with a 15–3 record.

The Bruins were invited to the 1988 NCAA Division I softball tournament, where they swept the West Regional and then completed a run through the Women's College World Series to claim their third NCAA Women's College World Series Championship. The Bruins had earlier claimed an AIAW title in 1978 and NCAA titles in 1982 and 1984.

== Personnel ==
=== Roster ===
1988 UCLA Bruins roster
Pitchers: 4 – Samantha Ford – junior; 9 – Lisa Longaker – sophomore; 13 – Michelle Phillips – junior; Catchers: 21 – Stacy Sunny – senior; 22 – Monica Tourville – junior	Infielders: 11 – Erica Ziencina – freshman; 12 - Kerry Dienelt – freshman; 14 – Janice Parks – junior; 15 – Missy Phillips – freshman; 24 – Lisa Hankerd – senior	Outfielders: 1 – Lorraine Maynez – freshman; 3 – Bea Chiaravanont – freshman; 7 – Shanna Flynn – freshman; 10 – Michelle Montgomery – sophomore; 17 – Karen Walker – junior

=== Coaches ===
1988 UCLA Bruins softball coaching staff
- Sharron Backus - 14th season
- Sue Enquist - 9th season
- Kirk Walker - 5th season

== Schedule ==
Legend
	UCLA win
	UCLA loss
*	Non-Conference game

1988 UCLA Bruins softball game log
Regular season

February
Date	Opponent	Site/stadium	Score	Overall record	Pac-10 record
Feb 12	at UC Santa Barbara*	Santa Barbara, CA	W 4–0	1–0	
Feb 12	at UC Santa Barbara*	Santa Barbara, CA	W 5–0^{3}	2–0	
Feb 14	at Fresno State*	Fresno, CA	W 5–1	3–0	
Feb 14	at Fresno State*	Fresno CA	W 5–3	4–0	
Feb 20	US International*	Sunset Field • Los Angeles, CA	L 0–1^{10}	4–1	
Feb 20	US International*	Sunset Field • Los Angeles, CA	W 4–0	5–1	
Feb 24	UC Santa Barbara*	Sunset Field • Los Angeles, CA	W 8–2	6–1	
Feb 24	UC Santa Barbara*	Sunset Field • Los Angeles, CA	W 2–1	7–1	
Feb 27	at California	Hearst Field • Berkeley, CA	W 6–0	8–1	1–0
Feb 27	at California	Hearst Field • Berkeley, CA	W 2–0	9–1	2–0
Feb 28	at San Francisco*	San Francisco, CA	W 9–1	10–1	
Feb 28	at San Francisco*	San Francisco, CA	W 8–0	11–1	

March
Date	Opponent	Site/stadium	Score	Overall record	Pac-10 record
Mar 2	at Long Beach State*	Long Beach, CA	W 1–0^{8}	12–1	
Mar 2	at Long Beach State*	Long Beach, CA	L 0–2	12–2	
Mar 5	Cal Poly Pomona*	Sunset Field • Los Angeles, CA	W 1–0^{13}	13–2	
Mar 5	Cal Poly Pomona*	Sunset Field • Los Angeles, CA	W 3–1	14–2	
Mar 11	Western Illinois*	Sunset Field • Los Angeles, CA	W 3–0	15–2	
Mar 11	Western Illinois*	Sunset Field • Los Angeles, CA	W 1–0	16–2	
Mar 20	Oregon	Sunset Field • Los Angeles, CA	W 1–0	17–2	3–0
Mar 20	Oregon	Sunset Field • Los Angeles, CA	L 0–2	17–3	3–1
Mar 21	Oregon State	Sunset Field • Los Angeles, CA	W 2–1^{10}	18–3	4–1
Mar 21	Oregon State	Sunset Field • Los Angeles, CA	W 8–1	19–3	5–1
Mar 25	vs Creighton*	San Jose, CA	W 9–0	20–3	
Mar 25	vs Northwestern*	San Jose, CA	W 4–1	21–3	
Mar 25	vs Adelphi*	San Jose, CA	W 1–0	22–3	
Mar 26	vs New Mexico*	San Jose, CA	W 4–0	23–3	
Mar 26	vs California*	San Jose, CA	W 1–0	24–3	
Mar 27	vs Adelphi*	San Jose, CA	W 1–0	25–3	
Mar 27	vs Nebraska*	San Jose, CA	W 9–0	26–3	
Mar 29	Nevada*	Sunset Field • Los Angeles, CA	W 14–0^{5}	27–3	
Mar 29	Nevada*	Sunset Field • Los Angeles, CA	W 12–1^{5}	28–3	
Mar 30	Northwestern*	Sunset Field • Los Angeles, CA	W 5–1	29–3	
Mar 30	Northwestern*	Sunset Field • Los Angeles, CA	W 2–0	30–3	

April
Date	Opponent	Site/stadium	Score	Overall record	Pac-10 record
Apr 2	at Arizona State	Tempe, AZ	W 14–1^{6}	31–3	6–1
Apr 2	at Arizona State	Tempe, AZ	W 1–0	32–3	7–1
Apr 4	at Arizona	Tucson, AZ	W 1–0	33–3	8–1
Apr 4	at Arizona	Tucson, AZ	L 0–1^{10}	33–4	8–2
Apr 8	Cal State Fullerton*	Sunset Field • Los Angeles, CA	W 6–1	34–4	
Apr 8	Cal State Fullerton*	Sunset Field • Los Angeles, CA	L 4–6	34–5	
Apr 13	Hawaii*	Sunset Field • Los Angeles, CA	W 8–0	35–5	
Apr 13	Hawaii*	Sunset Field • Los Angeles, CA	W 5–0	36–5	
Apr 16	at US International*		W 1–0	37–5	
Apr 16	at US International*		W 3–1	38–5	
Apr 22	Arizona State	Sunset Field • Los Angeles, CA	W 3–0	39–5	9–2
Apr 22	Arizona State	Sunset Field • Los Angeles, CA	W 4–3	40–5	10–2
Apr 25	Arizona	Sunset Field • Los Angeles, CA	W 1–0	41–5	11–2
Apr 25	Arizona	Sunset Field • Los Angeles, CA	W 2–0	42–5	12–2

May
Date	Opponent	Site/stadium	Score	Overall record	Pac-10 record
May 6	California	Sunset Field • Los Angeles, CA	W 4–0	43–5	13–2
May 6	California	Sunset Field • Los Angeles, CA	L 0–1^{9}	43–6	13–3
May 7	at Oregon	Howe Field • Eugene, OR	W 3–2^{10}	44–6	14–3
May 7	at Oregon	Howe Field • Eugene, OR	W 5–1	45–6	15–3
May 14	at Cal Poly Pomona*	Pomona, CA	L 1–2	45–7	
May 14	at Cal Poly Pomona*	Pomona, CA	W 1–0	46–7	

Postseason

NCAA Northwest Regional
Date	Opponent	Site/stadium	Score	Overall record	NCAAT record
May 17	Cal State Fullerton	Sunset Field • Los Angeles, CA	W 3–0	47–7	1–0
May 18	Cal State Fullerton	Sunset Field • Los Angeles, CA	W 2–0	48–7	2–0

NCAA Women's College World Series
Date	Opponent	Site/stadium	Score	Overall record	WCWS Record
May 20	Northern Illinois	Twin Creeks Sports Complex • Sunnyvale, CA	W 1–0	49–7	1–0
May 22	Fresno State	Twin Creeks Sports Complex • Sunnyvale, CA	W 6–1	50–7	2–0
May 28	Arizona	Twin Creeks Sports Complex • Sunnyvale, CA	W 5–0	51–7	3–0
May 28	Cal Poly Pomona	Twin Creeks Sports Complex • Sunnyvale, CA	W 4–1	52–7	4–0
May 29	Fresno State	Twin Creeks Sports Complex • Sunnyvale, CA	L 1–2	52–8	4–1
May 29	Fresno State	Twin Creeks Sports Complex • Sunnyvale, CA	W 3–0	53–8	5–1
