= 1988 NCAA Division I softball season =

American college softball season

- Defending Champions: Texas A&M

Tournament

Women's College World Series
- Duration: May 25–29, 1988
- Champions: UCLA (4th (5th overall) title)
- Runners-up: Fresno State (4th WCWS Appearance)
- Winning Coach: Sharron Backus (4th (5th overall) title)

Seasons
- ← 1987 1989 →

The 1988 NCAA Division I softball season, play of college softball in the United States organized by the National Collegiate Athletic Association (NCAA) at the Division I level, began in February 1988. The season progressed through the regular season, many conference tournaments and championship series, and concluded with the 1988 NCAA Division I softball tournament and 1988 Women's College World Series. The Women's College World Series, consisting of the eight remaining teams in the NCAA Tournament and held in Sunnyvale, California at ASA Hall of Fame Stadium, ended on May 29, 1988.

== Conference standings ==
1988 Big Ten Conference softball standings
	Conf.						Overall
Team	W		L		T	PCT	W		L		T	PCT
Minnesota ‍†‍‍^{y}	15	–	8	–	0	.652	31	–	25	–	0	.554
Michigan ‍‍‍	15	–	9	–	0	.625	29	–	20	–	0	.592
Northwestern ‍‍‍	14	–	10	–	0	.583	25	–	23	–	0	.521
Indiana ‍‍‍	13	–	10	–	1	.563	36	–	20	–	1	.640
Iowa ‍‍‍	10	–	13	–	0	.435	33	–	20	–	1	.620
Michigan State ‍‍‍	10	–	14	–	0	.417	21	–	30	–	0	.412
Ohio State ‍‍‍	5	–	18	–	0	.217	19	–	31	–	1	.382
† – Conference champion y – Invited to the NCAA tournament Rankings from Coaches' Poll

1988 Pacific-10 Conference softball standings
	Conf.				Overall
Team	W		L	PCT	W		L	PCT
UCLA ‍†‍‍^{y}	15	–	3	.833	53	–	8	.869
Arizona ‍‍‍^{y}	15	–	5	.750	54	–	18	.750
Oregon ‍‍‍	9	–	11	.450	32	–	26	.552
Arizona State ‍‍‍	8	–	12	.400	26	–	25	.510
California ‍‍‍^{y}	7	–	11	.389	38	–	22	.633
Oregon State ‍‍‍	2	–	14	.125	13	–	32	.289
† – Conference champion y – Invited to the NCAA tournament As of May 31, 1988; Rankings from Coaches' Poll

1988 Pacific Coast Athletic Association softball standings
	Conf.				Overall
Team	W		L	PCT	W		L	PCT
Fresno State ‍†‍‍^{y}	29	–	5	.853	55	–	17	.764
Cal Poly Pomona ‍‍‍^{y}	28	–	8	.778	57	–	16	.781
Cal State Fullerton ‍‍‍	24	–	10	.706	52	–	20	.722
Long Beach State ‍‍‍^{y}	25	–	11	.694	46	–	17	.730
Pacific ‍‍‍	16	–	18	.471	35	–	27	.565
Hawaii ‍‍‍	16	–	20	.444	30	–	29	.508
San Jose State ‍‍‍	13	–	19	.406	24	–	29	.453
San Diego State ‍‍‍	9	–	23	.281	24	–	33	.421
UNLV ‍‍‍	9	–	27	.250	18	–	29	.383
UC Santa Barbara ‍‍‍	3	–	31	.088	6	–	50	.107
† – Conference champion y – Invited to the NCAA tournament

1988 Southland Conference softball standings
	Conf.						Overall
Team	W		L		T	PCT	W		L		T	PCT
Sam Houston State ‍†‍‡‍	13	–	1	–	0	.929	49	–	17	–	0	.742
Texas–Arlington ‍‍‍	10	–	3	–	0	.769	34	–	27	–	0	.557
Stephen F. Austin ‍‍‍	10	–	4	–	0	.714	33	–	16	–	0	.673
Northwestern Louisiana ‍‍‍	6	–	7	–	0	.462	25	–	24	–	0	.510
Southwest Texas State ‍‍‍	6	–	8	–	0	.429	21	–	39	–	0	.350
Northeast Louisiana ‍‍‍	5	–	8	–	0	.385	24	–	35	–	0	.407
McNeese State ‍‍‍	3	–	11	–	0	.214	8	–	34	–	0	.190
North Texas ‍‍‍	1	–	12	–	0	.077	4	–	51	–	0	.073
† – Conference champion ‡ – Tournament champion y – Invited to the NCAA tournament As of May 20, 1988; Rankings from Coaches' Poll

== Women's College World Series ==
The 1988 NCAA Women's College World Series took place from May 25 to May 29, 1988 in Sunnyvale, California.

Upper round 1
UCLA	1
Northern Illinois	0
Fresno State	3
Texas A&M	0
Arizona	1
Adelphi	0
Cal Poly Pomona	3
Nebraska	0

Upper round 2
UCLA	6
Fresno State	1
Arizona	4
Cal State Pomona	1
Lower round 1
Northern Illinois	0
Texas A&M	3
Adelphi	1
Nebraska	5

Upper final
UCLA	5
Arizona	0
Lower round 2
Cal Poly Pomona	1
Texas A&M	0
Fresno State	1^{9}
Nebraska	0

Semifinals
UCLA	4
Cal Poly Pomona	1
Arizona	0
Fresno State	4

Final
UCLA	1	3
Fresno State	2	0

== Season leaders ==
Batting

- Batting average: .484 – Jill Justin, Northern Illinois Huskies
- RBIs: 59 – Dori Beach, Charleston Southern Buccaneers
- Home runs: 9 – Luevenia Moore, Florida A&M Lady Rattlers & Michele Smith, Oklahoma State Cowgirls

Pitching

- Wins: 50-8 – Debbie Nichols, Louisiana Tech Lady Techsters
- ERA: 0.29 (11 ER/259.1 IP) – Lisa Longaker, UCLA Bruins
- Strikeouts: 294 – Debby Day, UTA Mavericks

== Records ==
NCAA Division I season shutouts: 36 – Debbie Nichols, Louisiana Tech Lady Techsters

NCAA Division I season assists: 237 – Charis Monroe, Cal State Fullerton Titans

Freshman class triples: 13 – Tricia Popowski, South Carolina Gamecocks

Freshman class assists: 230 – Julie Standering, Arizona Wildcats

Sophomore class assists: 229 – Carie Dever, Fresno State Bulldogs

Sophomore class wins: 50 – Debbie Nichols, Louisiana Tech Lady Techsters

Junior class innings pitched: 425.0 – Julie Carpenter, Texas A&M Aggies

== Awards ==
- Honda Sports Award Softball:

Lisa Longaker, UCLA Bruins

YEAR	W	L	GP	GS	CG	SHO	SV	IP	H	R	ER	BB	SO	ERA	WHIP
1988	31	4	39	34	34	23	3	259.1	136	14	11	31	240	0.29	0.64

== All America Teams ==
The following players were members of the All-American Teams.

First Team

Position	Player	Class	School
P	Lisa Longaker	SO.	UCLA Bruins
P	Melanie Parrent	SR.	Fresno State Bulldogs
P	Debbie Nichols	SO.	Louisiana Tech Lady Techsters
C	Karen Sanchelli	SR.	South Carolina Gamecocks
1B	Jody Schwartz	SR.	Creighton Bluejays
2B	Alison Stowell	SR.	Cal Poly Pomona Broncos
3B	Janice Parks	JR.	UCLA Bruins
SS	Liz Mizeria	SR.	Texas A&M Aggies
OF	Jill Justin	JR.	Northern Illinois Huskies
OF	Lorraine Maynez	FR.	UCLA Bruins
OF	Dee Brewer	FR.	Oklahoma State Cowgirls
UT	Michele Smith	JR.	Oklahoma State Cowgirls

Second Team

Position	Player	Class	School
P	Gretchen Koenig	SR.	South Carolina Gamecocks
P	Teresa Cherry	SR.	Arizona Wildcats
P	Carie Dever	SO.	Fresno State Bulldogs
C	Kris Tipmore	SR.	Central Michigan Chippewas
1B	Gena Strang	SR.	Fresno State Bulldogs
2B	Julie Thomas	SR.	Sam Houston State Bearkats
3B	Valerie Douglas	SR.	Cal State Fullerton Titans
SS	Shari Johnson	JR.	Oklahoma State Cowgirls
OF	Linda Smolka	JR.	Princeton Tigers
OF	Amy Lienhardt	SR.	Bowling Green Falcons
OF	Angie McDonald	SR.	Eastern Michigan Eagles
UT	Kris Peterson	SR.	Adelphi Panthers
