= Kirin Kumar =

American softball coach

Current position
- Title: Head coach
- Team: Ohio State
- Conference: Big Ten
- Record: 71–41–1 (.633)

Biographical details
- Born: Santa Ana, California, U.S.
- Education: Georgia Tech

Playing career
- 2002–2005: Georgia Tech

Coaching career (HC unless noted)
- 2006–2010: Tulsa (asst.)
- 2011: North Carolina (asst)
- 2012–2013: Western Kentucky (asst.)
- 2014: Tennessee Tech (asst.)
- 2015–2016: Tulsa (asst.)
- 2017–2018: NC State (asst.)
- 2019–2020: Virginia Tech (asst.)
- 2021–2024: Miami (OH)
- 2025–present: Ohio State

Head coaching record
- Overall: 245–97–2 (.715)

Accomplishments and honors

Championships
- 3× MAC tournament champions (2022–2024); 4× MAC regular season (2021–2024)

Records
- 2× MAC Coach of the Year (2021, 2024)

Kirin Kumar is an American softball coach who is the current head coach at Ohio State.

== Coaching career ==
=== Tulsa ===
On June 19, 2014, Kumar was hired for a second stint as an assistant coach for the Tulsa softball program.

=== Miami (OH) ===
On August 31, 2020, Kumar was named as head coach of the Miami Redhawks program. Kumar spent four years as head coach at Miami Ohio, collecting a 174–56–1 overall record during her tenure.

=== Ohio State ===
On June 4, 2024, Kumar was named head coach of the Ohio State Buckeyes softball program.

== Head coaching record ==
=== College ===
Record table
Season	Team	Overall	Conference	Standing	Postseason
Miami RedHawks (Mid-American Conference) (2021–2024)
2021	Miami	46–10	36–2	1st	NCAA Regional
2022	Miami	40–17–1	24–5	1st	NCAA Regional
2023	Miami	39–20	21–8	1st	NCAA Regional
2024	Miami	49–9	26–1	1st	NCAA Regional
Miami:		174–56–1 (.755)	107–16 (.870)		
Ohio State Buckeyes (Big Ten Conference) (2025–present)
2025	Ohio State	45–14–1	16–6	T–4th	NCAA Regional
2026	Ohio State	26–27	13–11	8th	
Ohio State:		71–41–1 (.633)	29–17 (.630)		
Total:		245–97–2 (.715)			
National champion Postseason invitational champion Conference regular season champion Conference regular season and conference tournament champion Division regular season champion Division regular season and conference tournament champion Conference tournament champion
