= 1988 Arizona Wildcats softball team =

American college softball season

1988 Arizona Wildcats softball

NCAA Regional champion

Women's College World Series, T-3rd
- Conference: Pacific-10 Conference
- Record: 54–18 (15–5 Pac-10)
- Head coach: Mike Candrea (3rd season)

1988 Pacific-10 Conference softball standings
	Conf.				Overall
Team	W		L	PCT	W		L	PCT
UCLA ‍†‍‍^{y}	15	–	3	.833	53	–	8	.869
Arizona ‍‍‍^{y}	15	–	5	.750	54	–	18	.750
Oregon ‍‍‍	9	–	11	.450	32	–	26	.552
Arizona State ‍‍‍	8	–	12	.400	26	–	25	.510
California ‍‍‍^{y}	7	–	11	.389	38	–	22	.633
Oregon State ‍‍‍	2	–	14	.125	13	–	32	.289
† – Conference champion y – Invited to the NCAA tournament

The 1988 Arizona Wildcats softball team represented the University of Arizona in the 1988 NCAA Division I softball season. The Wildcats were coached by Mike Candrea, who led his third season. The Wildcats finished with a record of 54–18. They competed in the Pacific-10 Conference, where they finished second with a 15–5 record.

The Wildcats were invited to the 1988 NCAA Division I softball tournament, where they won the Mideast Regional and advanced to their first Women's College World Series. Arizona finished tied for third place with wins over Adelphi and fellow semifinalist Cal Poly Pomona and losses to eventual champion UCLA and runner-up Fresno State.

== Personnel ==
=== Roster ===
1988 Arizona Wildcats roster
Pitchers: 2 - Lisa Bautista - Senior; 14 - Teresa Cherry - Senior; 17 - Leslie VanOver - Junior; 24 - Ginnie Scheller - Sophomore; Catchers: 8 - Heidi Halbwachs - Freshman; 12 - Stacy Engel - Junior	Infielders: 4 - Julie Standering - Freshman; 6 - Vivian Holm - Sophomore; 10 - Heidi Lievens - Senior; 11 - Tammy McKinney - Senior; 15 - Karen Koebensky - Senior; 19 - Tracy Almhjell - Senior	Outfielders: 5 - Jamie Wheat - Senior; 7 - Kristin Gauthier - Freshman; 13 - Jane Dougall - Senior; 23 - Jeannette Amado - Senior; Utility: 22 - Suzanne Lady - Freshman

=== Coaches ===
1988 Arizona Wildcats softball coaching staff
- Mike Candrea - Head coach - 3rd season
- Larry Ray - Assistant coach - 3rd season

== Schedule ==
Legend
	Arizona win
	Arizona loss
*	Non-Conference game

1988 Arizona Wildcats softball game log
Regular season

February
Date	Opponent	Site/stadium	Score	Overall record	Pac-10 record
Feb 18	California	UA Softball Field • Tucson, AZ	W 3–2	1–0	1–0
Feb 18	California	UA Softball Field • Tucson, AZ	W 7–0	2–0	2–0
Feb 19	Cal State Northridge*	UA Softball Field • Tucson, AZ (Arizona Classic)	W 9–1	3–0	
Feb 20	Oregon*	UA Softball Field • Tucson, AZ (Arizona Classic)	W 6–0	4–0	
Feb 20	Cal State Fullerton*	UA Softball Field • Tucson, AZ (Arizona Classic)	W 2–1	5–0	
Feb 20	Kansas*	UA Softball Field • Tucson, AZ (Arizona Classic)	W 3–2	6–0	
Feb 21	Bowling Green*	UA Softball Field • Tucson, AZ (Arizona Classic)	W 3–0	7–0	
Feb 21	Oregon*	UA Softball Field • Tucson, AZ (Arizona Classic)	W 6–3	8–0	
Feb 21	Cal State Fullerton*	UA Softball Field • Tucson, AZ (Arizona Classic)	L 0–1	8–1	
Feb 23	US International*	UA Softball Field • Tucson, AZ	W 5–0	9–1	
Feb 23	US International*	UA Softball Field • Tucson, AZ	W 3–1	10–1	
Feb 25	vs Minnesota*	Sun Devil Club Stadium • Tempe, AZ (Kajikawa Classic)	W 4–0	11–1	
Feb 25	vs Arizona State*	Sun Devil Club Stadium • Tempe, AZ (Kajikawa Classic)	W 3–1	12–1	
Feb 26	vs Cal Poly Pomona*	Sun Devil Club Stadium • Tempe, AZ (Kajikawa Classic)	L 3–4	12–2	
Feb 26	vs US International*	Sun Devil Club Stadium • Tempe, AZ (Kajikawa Classic)	W 1–0	13–2	
Feb 27	vs Utah State*	Sun Devil Club Stadium • Tempe, AZ (Kajikawa Classic)	W 3–2	14–2	

March
Date	Opponent	Site/stadium	Score	Overall record	Pac-10 record
Mar 1	Utah State*	UA Softball Field • Tucson, AZ	L 2–3	14–3	
Mar 1	Utah State*	UA Softball Field • Tucson, AZ	L 3–6	14–4	
Mar 3	vs Utah*	NM State Softball Complex • Las Cruces, NM (Roadrunner Invitational)	W 2–0	15–4	
Mar 3	vs Northeast Louisiana*	NM State Softball Complex • Las Cruces, NM (Roadrunner Invitational)	L 1–2	15–5	
Mar 3	vs Minnesota*	NM State Softball Complex • Las Cruces, NM (Roadrunner Invitational)	L 1–3	15–6	
Mar 4	vs Hawaii*	NM State Softball Complex • Las Cruces, NM (Roadrunner Invitational)	W 2–0	16–6	
Mar 4	vs Fresno State*	NM State Softball Complex • Las Cruces, NM (Roadrunner Invitational)	W 2–0	17–6	
Mar 5	vs Wichita State*	NM State Softball Complex • Las Cruces, NM (Roadrunner Invitational)	W 5–0	18–6	
Mar 5	vs Toledo*	NM State Softball Complex • Las Cruces, NM (Roadrunner Invitational)	W 9–2	19–6	
Mar 5	Oklahoma*	UA Softball Field • Tucson, AZ	W 11–2	20–6	
Mar 11	at Oregon	Howe Field • Eugene, OR	W 4–0	21–6	3–0
Mar 11	at Oregon	Howe Field • Eugene, OR	L 0–3	21–7	3–1
Mar 12	at Oregon State	Corvallis, OR	W 1–0	22–7	4–1
Mar 12	at Oregon State	Corvallis, OR	W 2–0	23–7	5–1
Mar 15	Arizona State	UA Softball Field • Tucson, AZ	W 5–1	24–7	6–1
Mar 15	Arizona State	UA Softball Field • Tucson, AZ	W 6–1	25–7	7–1
Mar 24	vs San Francisco*	Anderson Family Field • Fullerton, CA (Judi Garman Classic)	W 1–0	26–7	
Mar 24	vs Toledo*	Anderson Family Field • Fullerton, CA (Judi Garman Classic)	W 6–0	27–7	
Mar 25	vs Cal Poly Pomona*	Anderson Family Field • Fullerton, CA (Judi Garman Classic)	L 1–4	27–8	
Mar 25	vs Long Beach State*	Anderson Family Field • Fullerton, CA (Judi Garman Classic)	L 0–7	27–9	
Mar 26	vs Oregon*	Anderson Family Field • Fullerton, CA (Judi Garman Classic)	W 6–0	28–9	
Mar 26	vs US International*	Anderson Family Field • Fullerton, CA (Judi Garman Classic)	W 7–0	29–9	
Mar 27	vs Fresno State*	Anderson Family Field • Fullerton, CA (Judi Garman Classic)	W 3–0	30–9	

April/May
Date	Opponent	Site/stadium	Score	Overall record	Pac-10 record
Apr 2	New Mexico State*	UA Softball Field • Tucson, AZ	W 6–0	31–9	
Apr 2	New Mexico State*	UA Softball Field • Tucson, AZ	W 3–1	32–9	
Apr 4	UCLA	UA Softball Field • Tucson, AZ	L 0–1	32–10	7–2
Apr 4	UCLA	UA Softball Field • Tucson, AZ	W 1–0	33–10	8–2
Apr 9	at California	Strawberry Field • Berkeley, CA	W 3–2	34–10	9–2
Apr 9	at California	Strawberry Field • Berkeley, CA	L 0–4	34–11	9–3
Apr 15	Oregon	UA Softball Field • Tucson, AZ	W 5–4	35–11	10–3
Apr 18	Oregon State	UA Softball Field • Tucson, AZ	W 4–0	36–11	11–3
Apr 18	Oregon State	UA Softball Field • Tucson, AZ	W 4–0	37–11	12–3
Apr 19	at Arizona State	Sun Devil Club Stadium • Tempe, AZ	W 1–0	38–11	13–3
Apr 19	at Arizona State	Sun Devil Club Stadium • Tempe, AZ	W 11–1	39–11	14–3
Apr 25	at UCLA	Sunset Field • Los Angeles, CA	L 0–1	39–12	14–4
Apr 25	at UCLA	Sunset Field • Los Angeles	L 0–2	39–13	14–5
Apr 28	vs Texas A&M*	Logan, UT (Utah/Utah State Classic)	W 1–0	40–13	
Apr 28	vs Utah State*	Logan, UT (Utah/Utah State Classic)	W 1–0	41–13	
Apr 29	vs Southern Utah*	Logan, UT (Utah/Utah State Classic)	W 1–0	42–13	
Apr 29	vs Utah*	Logan, UT (Utah/Utah State Classic)	L 0–1	42–14	
Apr 30	vs Utah State*	Logan, UT (Utah/Utah State Classic)	W 3–1	43–14	
Apr 30	vs Texas A&M*	Logan, UT (Utah/Utah State Classic)	W 1–0	44–14	
May 7	at US International		L 0–1	44–15	
May 7	at US International		W 2–1	45–16	

Postseason

NCAA Regional
Date	Opponent	Site/stadium	Score	Overall record	NCAAT record
May 20	Minnesota	UA Softball Field • Tucson, AZ	W 5–0	46–15	1–0
May 20	South Carolina	UA Softball Field • Tucson, AZ	L 0–1	46–16	1–1
May 21	South Carolina	UA Softball Field • Tucson, AZ	W 1–0	47–16	2–1
May 21	South Carolina	UA Softball Field • Tucson, AZ	W 4–3	48–16	3–1

NCAA Women's College World Series
Date	Opponent	Site/stadium	Score	Overall record	WCWS Record
May 26	Adelphi	Twin Creeks Sports Complex • Sunnyvale, CA	W 1–0	49–16	1–0
May 27	Cal Poly Pomona	Twin Creeks Sports Complex • Sunnyvale, CA	W 4–1	50–16	2–0
May 28	UCLA	Twin Creeks Sports Complex • Sunnyvale, CA	L 0–5	50–17	2–1
May 28	Fresno State	Twin Creeks Sports Complex • Sunnyvale, CA	L 0–4	50–18	2–2
