= Jodi Hermanek =

American softball coach

Biographical details
- Education: Colorado State – Pueblo

Playing career
- 1995–1999: Colorado State – Pueblo

Coaching career (HC unless noted)
- 2000–2003: Colorado State – Pueblo (asst.)
- 2003–2004: Denton HS
- 2005–2008: Southern Utah
- 2009–2018: Ohio
- 2019–2023: Pittsburgh

Head coaching record
- Overall: 473–507–1 (.483)
- Tournaments: NCAA: 3–8 (.273)

Accomplishments and honors

Championships
- MAC Regular Season Champions (2018) 2× MAC tournament Champions (2014, 2018); 3× MAC East Division Champions (2011, 2017, 2018); 2× MCC Regular Season Champions (2005, 2007) 2× MCC Tournament Champions (2006, 2007)

Jodi Hermanek is an American softball coach who most recently was the head coach at Pittsburgh.

== Coaching career ==
=== Pittsburgh ===
On August 7, 2018, Jodi Hermanek was announced as the new head coach of the Pittsburgh softball program. Hermanek replaced Holly Aprile who left to take the same position at Louisville. At the end of the 2023 season, Pitt athletic director Heather Lyke announced a head coaching change, and thanked Hermanek for her hard work and dedication to the team. Hall of Famer Jenny Allard was named to replace Hermanek.

== Head coaching record ==
=== College ===
Record table
Season	Team	Overall	Conference	Standing	Postseason
Southern Utah Thunderbirds (Summit League) (2005–2008)
2005	Southern Utah	23–25–1	18–6	1st	
2006	Southern Utah	34–32	21–3	1st	NCAA Regional
2007	Southern Utah	30–31	12–6	2nd	NCAA Regional
2008	Southern Utah	20–34	12–9	3rd	
Southern Utah:		107–122–1 (.467)	63–24 (.724)		
Ohio Bobcats (Mid-American Conference) (2009–2018)
2009	Ohio	22–25	12–10	3rd (East)	
2010	Ohio	20–32	14–8	T-2nd (East)	
2011	Ohio	26–23	12–8	1st (East)	
2012	Ohio	28–29	14–8	3rd (East)	
2013	Ohio	28–29	9–13	T-3rd (East)	
2014	Ohio	32–24	12–8	4th (East)	NCAA Regional
2015	Ohio	15–32	7–11	4th (East)	
2016	Ohio	37–23	14–9	3rd (East)	
2017	Ohio	42–18	17–7	1st (East)	
2018	Ohio	40–17	20–3	1st (East)	NCAA Regional
Ohio:		290–252 (.535)	131–85 (.606)		
Pittsburgh Panthers (Atlantic Coast Conference) (2019–2023)
2019	Pittsburgh	13–40	7–17	6th (Coastal)	
2020	Pittsburgh	8–12	2–4	T-7th	Season canceled due to COVID-19
2021	Pittsburgh	17–29	12–24	11th	
2022	Pittsburgh	14–27	2–20	13th	
2023	Pittsburgh	24–25	6–17	11th	
Pittsburgh:		76–133 (.364)	29–82 (.261)		
Total:		473–507–1 (.483)			
National champion Postseason invitational champion Conference regular season champion Conference regular season and conference tournament champion Division regular season champion Division regular season and conference tournament champion Conference tournament champion
