= 1988 NCAA Division I softball tournament =

- Teams: 20
- Finals site: Twin Creeks Sports Complex; Sunnyvale, California
- Champions: UCLA (4th (5th overall) title)
- Runner-up: Fresno State (4th WCWS Appearance)
- Winning coach: Sharron Backus (4th (5th overall) title)

The 1988 NCAA Division I softball tournament was the seventh annual tournament to determine the national champion of NCAA women's collegiate softball. Held during May 1988, twenty Division I college softball teams contested the championship, an expansion of four teams from the previous year. The tournament featured eight regionals of either two or three teams. The regions of two teams consisted of a simple best-of-three series whereas the regions of three teams consisted of a double elimination tournament of four or five games. The 1988 Women's College World Series was held in Sunnyvale, California from May 25 through May 29 and marked the conclusion of the 1988 NCAA Division I softball season. UCLA won the championship by defeating Fresno State 3–0 in the final game.

The 1988 event was the first WCWS played in Sunnyvale.

== Regionals ==
=== At-large Regional ===
Team		G1	G2	G3
–	Fresno State	0	3	5
–	California	3^{8}	0	2

- Fresno State qualifies for WCWS, 2–1

=== Central Regional ===
==== First elimination round ====
- Creighton 3, Iowa State 2
- Nebraska 5, Iowa State 2
- Creighton 3, Nebraska 2

==== Second elimination round ====
Team		G1	G2
–	Nebraska	7	4
–	Creighton	2	1

- Nebraska qualifies for WCWS, 3–1

=== Mideast Regional ===
==== First elimination round ====
- South Carolina 1, Minnesota 0
- Arizona 5, Minnesota 0
- South Carolina 1, Arizona 0

==== Second elimination round ====
Team		G1	G2
–	Arizona	1	4
–	South Carolina	0	3

- Arizona qualifies for WCWS, 3–1

=== Midwest Regional ===
==== First elimination round ====
- Northern Illinois 4, Bowling Green 3
- Illinois State 2, Bowling Green 1 (10 innings)
- Illinois State 1, Northern Illinois 0

==== Second elimination round ====
Team		G1	G2
–	Northern Illinois	3	2
–	Illinois State	1	0

- Northern Illinois qualifies for WCWS, 3–1

=== Northeast Regional ===
Team		G1	G2	G3
–	Adelphi	6	0	1^{10}
–	Oklahoma State	2	5	0

- Adelphi qualifies for WCWS, 2–1

=== Northwest Regional ===
Team		G1	G2	G3
–	UCLA	3	2	—
–	Cal State Fullerton	0	0	—

- UCLA qualifies for WCWS, 2–0

=== South Regional ===
==== First elimination round ====
- Texas A&M 1, Florida State 0
- Louisiana Tech 6, Florida State 1
- Texas A&M 2, Louisiana Tech 0

==== Second elimination round ====
Team		G1	G2
–	Texas A&M	0	1 ^{8}
–	Louisiana Tech	4	0

- Texas A&M qualifies for WCWS, 3–1

=== West Regional ===
Team		G1	G2	G3
–	Cal Poly Pomona	2	2	—
–	Long Beach State	0	1	—

- Cal Poly Pomona qualifies for WCWS, 2–0

== Women's College World Series ==
=== Participants ===
- Adelphi
- Arizona
- Cal Poly Pomona
- Fresno State
- Nebraska
- Northern Illinois
- Texas A&M
- UCLA

=== Game results ===
==== Bracket ====
Upper round 1
UCLA	1
Northern Illinois	0
Fresno State	3
Texas A&M	0
Arizona	1
Adelphi	0
Cal Poly Pomona	3
Nebraska	0

Upper round 2
UCLA	6
Fresno State	1
Arizona	4
Cal State Pomona	1
Lower round 1
Northern Illinois	0
Texas A&M	3
Adelphi	1
Nebraska	5

Upper final
UCLA	5
Arizona	0
Lower round 2
Cal Poly Pomona	1
Texas A&M	0
Fresno State	1^{9}
Nebraska	0

Semifinals
UCLA	4
Cal Poly Pomona	1
Arizona	0
Fresno State	4

Final
UCLA	1	3
Fresno State	2	0

==== Game log ====
Date	Game	Winning team	Score	Losing team	Notes
May 20	Game 1	UCLA	1–0	Northern Illinois	
May 20	Game 2	Fresno State	3–0	Texas A&M	
May 21	Game 3	Arizona	1–0	Adelphi	
May 21	Game 4	Cal Poly Pomona	3–0	Nebraska	
May 22	Game 5	Texas A&M	3–0	Northern Illinois	Northern Illinois eliminated
May 22	Game 6	Nebraska	5–1	Adelphi	Adelphi eliminated
May 22	Game 7	UCLA	6–1	Fresno State	
May 22	Game 8	Arizona	4–1	Cal Poly Pomona	
May 23	Game 9	Fresno State	1–0^{9}	Nebraska	Nebraska eliminated
May 23	Game 10	Cal Poly Pomona	1–0	Texas A&M	Texas A&M eliminated
May 23	Game 11	UCLA	5–0	Arizona	
May 23	Game 12	Fresno State	4–0	Arizona	Arizona eliminated
May 23	Game 13	UCLA	4–1	Cal Poly Pomona	Cal Poly Pomona eliminated
May 24	Game 14	Fresno State	2–1	UCLA	
May 24	Game 15	UCLA	3–0	Fresno State	UCLA wins WCWS

=== Championship Game ===
School	Top Batter	Stats.
UCLA Bruins	Janice Parks (3B)	2-2 2RBIs 2B BB
Fresno State Bulldogs	RaeAnn Pifferini (LF)	2-4

School	Pitcher	IP	H	R	ER	BB	SO	AB	BF
UCLA Bruins	Lisa Longaker (W)	7.0	6	0	0	3	3	27	30
Fresno State Bulldogs	Carie Dever (L)	7.0	9	3	2	1	3	24	29

=== All-Tournament Team ===
The following players were named to the All-Tournament Team

Pos	Name	School
P	Carie Dever	Fresno St.
P	Lisa Longaker	UCLA
C	Stacy Sunny	UCLA
1B	Kerry Dienelt	UCLA
2B	Missy Phillips	UCLA
3B	Julie Standering	Arizona
SS	Heidi Lievens	Arizona
OF	Shanna Flynn	UCLA
OF	Margie Ogrodowicz	Nebraska
OF	RaeAnn Pifferini	Fresno State
AL	Gena Strang	Fresno State
AL	Karin Richter	Fresno State

== See also ==
- 1988 NCAA Division II softball tournament
- 1988 NCAA Division III softball tournament
- 1988 NAIA softball tournament
- 1988 NCAA Division I baseball tournament
