= 1988 Fresno State Bulldogs softball team =

American college softball season

1988 Fresno State Bulldogs softball

NCAA At-large Regional champion PCAA Champion

Women's College World Series, runner-up
- Conference: Pacific Coast Athletic Association
- Record: 55–17 (29–5 PCAA)
- Head coach: Margie Wright (3rd season)

1988 Pacific Coast Athletic Association softball standings
| | Conf. | | | | Overall |
| Team | W | | L | PCT | W | | L | PCT |
|---|---|---|---|---|---|---|---|---|
| Fresno State ‍†‍‍^{y} | 29 | – | 5 | .853 | 55 | – | 17 | .764 |
| Cal Poly Pomona ‍‍‍^{y} | 28 | – | 8 | .778 | 57 | – | 16 | .781 |
| Cal State Fullerton ‍‍‍ | 24 | – | 10 | .706 | 52 | – | 20 | .722 |
| Long Beach State ‍‍‍^{y} | 25 | – | 11 | .694 | 46 | – | 17 | .730 |
| Pacific ‍‍‍ | 16 | – | 18 | .471 | 35 | – | 27 | .565 |
| Hawaii ‍‍‍ | 16 | – | 20 | .444 | 30 | – | 29 | .508 |
| San Jose State ‍‍‍ | 13 | – | 19 | .406 | 24 | – | 29 | .453 |
| San Diego State ‍‍‍ | 9 | – | 23 | .281 | 24 | – | 33 | .421 |
| UNLV ‍‍‍ | 9 | – | 27 | .250 | 18 | – | 29 | .383 |
| UC Santa Barbara ‍‍‍ | 3 | – | 31 | .088 | 6 | – | 50 | .107 |
† – Conference champion y – Invited to the NCAA tournament

The 1988 Fresno State Bulldogs softball team represented California State University, Fresno in the 1988 NCAA Division I softball season. The Bulldogs were coached by Margie Wright, who led her third season. The Bulldogs finished with a record of 55–17. They competed in the Pacific Coast Athletic Association, where they finished first with a 29–5 record.

The Bulldogs were invited to the 1988 NCAA Division I Softball Tournament, where they swept the NCAA At-large Regional and then completed a run to the title game of the Women's College World Series where they fell to champion UCLA.

== Roster ==
1988 Fresno State Bulldogs roster
| Pitchers: 41 - Melanie Parrent; Catchers: 32 - Laura Macedo; 35 - Shelly Stokes | Infielders: 5 - Geri Ciandro; 30 - Carie Dever; 42 - Gina LoPiccolo; 18 - Kathy Mayer; 33 - Martha Noffsinger; 38 - Gena Strang | Outfielders: 20 - Shelly Morrison; 25 - RaeAnn Pifferini; 10 - Jill Polanco; 40 - Jill Rafel; 45 - Karen Richter; Utility: - Carol Taniguchi |

== Schedule ==
Legend
| | Fresno State win |
| | Fresno State loss |
| * | Non-Conference game |

1988 Fresno State Bulldogs softball game log
Regular season

| Date | Opponent | Site/stadium | Score | Overall record | NCAC record |
|---|---|---|---|---|---|
| Feb 14 | UCLA* | Bulldog Diamond • Fresno, CA | L 1–5 | 0–1 | |
| Feb 14 | UCLA* | Bulldog Diamond • Fresno, CA | L 3–5 | 0–2 | |
| | Nevada* | Bulldog Diamond • Fresno, CA | W 8–0 | 1–2 | |
| | Nevada* | Bulldog Diamond • Fresno, CA | W 7–0 | 2–2 | |
| | vs Utah State* | | W 7–0 | 3–2 | |
| | vs Colorado State* | | W 3–1 | 4–2 | |
| | vs Stephen F. Austin* | | W 3–0 | 5–2 | |
| | vs Toledo* | | W 8–2 | 6–2 | |
| | vs Arizona* | | L 0–2 | 6–3 | |
| | vs Minnesota* | | W 1–0 | 7–3 | |
| | vs Arizona State* | | W 2–1 | 8–3 | |
| | vs Cal State Fullerton* | | L 1–2 | 8–4 | |
| | vs UNLV* | | W 4–0 | 9–4 | |
| | vs UNLV* | | W 6–0 | 10–4 | |
| | Pacific | Bulldog Diamond • Fresno, CA | W 1–0 | 11–4 | 1–0 |
| | Pacific | Bulldog Diamond • Fresno, CA | W 4–0 | 12–4 | 2–0 |
| | Cal State Fullerton | Bulldog Diamond • Fresno, CA | W 3–1 | 13–4 | 3–0 |
| | Cal State Fullerton | Bulldog Diamond • Fresno, CA | L 1–4 | 13–5 | 3–1 |
| | at San Jose State | San Jose, CA | W 4–1 | 14–5 | 4–1 |
| | at San Jose State | San Jose, CA | W 3–2 | 15–5 | 5–1 |
| | Michigan* | Bulldog Diamond • Fresno, CA | W 1–0 | 16–5 | |
| | Michigan* | Bulldog Diamond • Fresno, CA | W 2–0 | 17–5 | |
| | Hawaii | Bulldog Diamond • Fresno, CA | W 1–0 | 18–5 | 6–1 |
| | Hawaii | Bulldog Diamond • Fresno, CA | W 1–0 | 19–5 | 7–1 |
| | Hawaii | Bulldog Diamond • Fresno, CA | W 1–0 | 20–5 | 8–1 |
| | Hawaii | Bulldog Diamond • Fresno, CA | W 4–0 | 21–5 | 9–1 |
| | vs Oregon* | | W 4–0 | 22–5 | |
| | vs Utah* | | W 2–1 | 23–5 | |
| | vs UC Santa Barbara* | | W 4–0 | 24–5 | |
| | vs Oklahoma State* | | L 0–2 | 24–6 | |
| | vs Cal State Fullerton* | | W 1–0 | 25–6 | |
| | vs Cal Poly Pomona* | | W 4–1 | 26–6 | |
| | vs Arizona* | | L 0–4 | 26–7 | |
| | Long Beach State | Bulldog Diamond • Fresno, CA | L 0–1 | 26–8 | 9–2 |
| | Long Beach State* | Bulldog Diamond • Fresno, CA | W 3–0 | 27–8 | 10–2 |
| | California* | Bulldog Diamond • Fresno, CA | L 1–3 | 27–9 | |
| | California* | Bulldog Diamond • Fresno, CA | W 3–1 | 28–9 | |
| | at UC Santa Barbara | Santa Barbara, CA | W 4–0 | 29–9 | 11–2 |
| | at UC Santa Barbara | Santa Barbara, CA | W 6–0 | 30–9 | 12–2 |
| | Cal Poly | Bulldog Diamond • Fresno, CA | W 4–0 | 31–9 | 13–2 |
| | Cal Poly | Bulldog Diamond • Fresno, CA | W 2–0 | 32–9 | 14–2 |
| | San Diego State | Bulldog Diamond • Fresno, CA | W 7–0 | 33–9 | 15–2 |
| | San Diego State | Bulldog Diamond • Fresno, CA | W 11–0 | 34–9 | 16–2 |
| | Cal Poly Pomona | Bulldog Diamond • Fresno, CA | W 4–1 | 35–9 | 17–2 |
| | Cal Poly Pomona | Bulldog Diamond • Fresno, CA | L 2–3 | 35–10 | 17–3 |
| | at California* | Hearst Field • Berkeley, CA | L 2–5 | 35–11 | |
| | at California* | Hearst Field • Berkeley, CA | W 1–0 | 36–11 | |
| | at Long Beach State | Long Beach, CA | W 4–1 | 37–11 | 18–3 |
| | at Long Beach State | Long Beach, CA | W 3–0 | 38–11 | 19–3 |
| | at Cal State Fullerton | Anderson Family Field • Fullerton, CA | W 2–0 | 39–11 | 20–3 |
| | at Cal State Fullerton | Anderson Family Field • Fullerton, CA | W 3–0 | 40–11 | 21–3 |
| | San Jose State | Bulldog Diamond • Fresno, CA | W 1–0 | 41–11 | 22–3 |
| | at UNLV | Paradise, NV | W 3–1 | 42–11 | 23–3 |
| | at UNLV | Paradise, NV | W 2–0 | 43–11 | 24–3 |
| | at Cal Poly Pomona | Pomona, CA | L 0–2 | 43–12 | 24–4 |
| | at Cal Poly Pomona | Pomona, CA | L 0–1 | 43–13 | 24–5 |
| | US International* | Bulldog Diamond • Fresno, CA | W 4–3 | 44–13 | |
| | US International* | Bulldog Diamond • Fresno, CA | L 2–3 | 44–14 | |
| | at Pacific | Stockton, CA | W 2–1 | 45–14 | 25–5 |
| | at Pacific | Stockton, CA | W 6–1 | 46–14 | 26–5 |
| | UC Santa Barbara | Bulldog Diamond • Fresno, CA | W 1–0 | 47–14 | 27–5 |
| | UC Santa Barbara | Bulldog Diamond • Fresno, CA | W 1–0 | 48–14 | 28–5 |
| | San Jose State | Bulldog Diamond • Fresno, CA | W 1–0 | 49–14 | 29–5 |

Postseason

NCAA At-large Regional
| Date | Opponent | Site/stadium | Score | Overall record | NCAAT record |
|---|---|---|---|---|---|
| | California | Bulldog Diamond • Fresno, CA | L 0–3 | 49–15 | 0–1 |
| | California | Bulldog Diamond • Fresno, CA | W 3–0 | 50–15 | 1–1 |
| | California | Bulldog Diamond • Fresno, CA | W 5–2 | 51–15 | 2–1 |

NCAA Women's College World Series
| Date | Opponent | Site/stadium | Score | Overall record | WCWS Record |
|---|---|---|---|---|---|
| May 20 | Texas A&M | Twin Creeks Sports Complex • Sunnyvale, CA | W 3–0 | 52–15 | 1–0 |
| May 22 | UCLA | Twin Creeks Sports Complex • Sunnyvale, CA | L 1–6 | 52–16 | 1–1 |
| May 23 | Nebraska | Twin Creeks Sports Complex • Sunnyvale, CA | W 1–0 | 53–16 | 2–1 |
| May 23 | Arizona | Twin Creeks Sports Complex • Sunnyvale, CA | W 4–0 | 54–16 | 3–1 |
| May 24 | UCLA | Twin Creeks Sports Complex • Sunnyvale, CA | W 2–1 | 55–16 | 4–1 |
| May 24 | UCLA | Twin Creeks Sports Complex • Sunnyvale, CA | L 0–3 | 55–17 | 4–2 |
