= Jill Justin =

American softball player (born 1967)

Jill Justin-Coffel (born October 1967) is an American, former collegiate NCAA Division I All-American, right-handed hitting softball player, originally from Oak Lawn, Illinois. She played for the Northern Illinois Huskies softball team as an outfielder from 1986 to 1989, partly in the Mid-American Conference and defunct North Star Conference. She and later was a medal-winning member of Team USA softball. She is the 4-year batting average champion (5th overall) for the NCAA and owns nearly all Huskie batting records.

== Northern Illinois Huskies ==
Justin-Coffel graduated from Harold L. Richards High School in 1986 with a Hall-of-Fame career. In her 1986 freshman season, she earned All-MAC conference honors and set new school season records for batting average, home runs and slugging percentage, all of which rank in the top-5 at the school. On April 4, 1986, Justin-Coffel hit a school single-game record of three doubles vs. the Ball State Cardinals.

During her sophomore year, Justin-Coffel earned First Team All-American recognition. The Huskie broke her own average and slugging records whilst also posting new records in hits, doubles and on-base percentage. Justin-Coffel still heads the lists in single season slugging, while her hits and triples are tied for second place all-time in the program. Her school record batting average and doubles (career bests) also led the NCAA.

Justin-Coffel also achieved a then university record 15 consecutive game hitting streak. On May 1, 1987, she became the first player in NCAA Division I to hit three home runs and amass a total of 13 bases for a single game (against the Bradley Braves), in which the Huskies eventually won 12–2. Both record totals from the game were tops for the Division.

In 1988, Justin-Coffel was once again honored as a First Team All-American. She was also selected for the All-North Star conference accolade after the program spent the previous year as an Independent. For the second consecutive time, she was crowned batting champ in the NCAA. Justin-Coffel's home run and on-base percentage were new school records, she still retains the on-base title; her hits were second only to her previous year's mark and remains top-5 all-time. Along with her RBI total, she earned a conference batting Triple Crown.

The Huskies entered their first Women's College World Series and it also would be Justin-Coffel's only appearance. The team was eliminated by the eventual champions the UCLA Bruins on May 27; she had a double and two walks in two games. For that World Series, Justin-Coffel was awarded the NSC Offensive MVP title.

For her final season with the Huskies, Justin-Coffel was awarded with all-season honors as a 1989 First Team All-American and received her second All-North Star selection. Achieving a .443 average, it was the first occasion a Division I player had hit .400 or better in all four eligible seasons of play. For the Huskies, Justin-Coffel held all the top seasons averages and she also surpassed Yvette Cannon (George Mason Patriots) for the batting crown in all Division I capacities where at least two seasons of 250 at-bats were played. Her career best RBI total was also a new school record, while her on-base and triples were and still do rank top-5, and she led the NCAA in slugging percentage with another career best. These would help her to a second conference batting Triple Crown.

Justin-Coffel claims career records in average, RBIs, hits, home runs, triples, doubles, slugging and on base percentages; she is second in runs for the Huskies. In the NCAA, she posted the best slugging percentage and still ranks in the top-20 for a career.

== Post-NIU ==
Justin-Coffel was invited to join Team USA and proceeded to win gold at the World and Pan-American championships between 1990 and 1995. She also auditioned for the 1996 Atlanta Olympics.

The former Huskie also played during the summer season for the Connecticut Brakettes from 1999 to 2004 and set all-time team records for RBIs, home runs and doubles. On August 24, 2001, Justin-Coffel "singled to drive" in the winning run for the National A.S.A. Championship, in which the Brakettes won 2–1.

In 1994, Justin-Coffel was inducted into the NIU Athletics Hall of Fame and, in 2002, was inducted a second time alongside her 1988 teammates. Justin-Coffel was also inducted into the Harold L. Richards High School's Hall of Fame on September 24, 2006.

As of 2006, Justin-Coffel worked as a physical education (PE) instructor in Illinois state.

== Statistics ==
=== Northern Illinois Huskies softball ===
YEAR	G	AB	R	H	BA	RBI	HR	3B	2B	TB	SLG	BB	SO	SB	SBA
1986	42	131	26	57	.435	28	6	6	12	99	.755%	10	7	11	14
1987	49	147	53	74	.503	34	5	7	20	123	.836%	25	6	10	10
1988	46	126	31	61	.484	34	8	1	18	105	.833%	29	1	3	4
1989	45	131	38	58	.443	38	5	8	6	95	.725%	30	4	8	9
TOTALS	182	535	148	250	.467	134	24	22	56	422	.789%	94	18	32	37

== Links ==
- NCAA Division I softball career .400 batting average list
