= Buffalo Bulls softball =

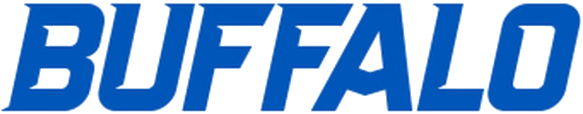
- University: State University of New York at Buffalo
- Head coach: Chelsea Plimpton (1st season)
- Conference: MAC; East Division
- Location: Amherst, New York, US
- Home stadium: Nan Harvey Field
- Nickname: Bulls
- Colors: Royal blue and white

Regular-season conference championships
- 1985

The Buffalo Bulls softball team represents the University at Buffalo for college softball in NCAA Division I. The team participates in the East Division of the Mid-American Conference (MAC). The team plays its home games at Nan Harvey Field located on the university's campus.

== History ==
The University at Buffalo softball program was established in 1979, originally competing at the Division III level. The university discontinued the program in 1987. On November 3, 1998, the university announced the reinstatement of the softball program, as mandated by the Mid-American Conference. Marie Curran was named head coach on May 6, 1999. The Bulls opened their first Division I softball season on March 3, 2000, as an Independent school, sweeping St. Michael's College in Orlando, Florida. In 2001, the Bulls became a full-fledged member of the MAC. Marie Curran was relieved of her duties after nine seasons, and was replaced by Jennifer Teague on July 15, 2008. Teague coached the team for five seasons before being relieved of her duties on May 30, 2013. On July 12 of the same year, Buffalo named former LSU All-American Trena Peel as their new head coach.

== No-hitters ==
The following five no-hitters have been thrown by Buffalo pitchers over the program's history.

- May 8, 2004. Stacey Evans at Toledo (won 1–0)
- April 14, 2010. Terese Diaz vs St. Bonaventure (won 7–0)
- April 5, 2014. Tori Speckman at Ohio (won 4–0)
- May 3, 2014. Tori Speckman at Kent State (won 9–0, 5 innings)
- March 23, 2018. Ally Power vs Eastern Michigan (won 9–1, 5 innings)

== Year-by-year results ==
Season	Conference	Coach	Overall				Conference				Notes
Season	Conference	Coach	Games	Win	Loss	Tie	Games	Win	Loss	Tie	Notes
2000	Independent	Marie Curran	45	7	38	0	0	0	0	0	
2001	MAC	Marie Curran	52	12	40	0	24	4	20	0	
2002	MAC	Marie Curran	38	13	25	0	24	8	16	0	
2003	MAC	Marie Curran	39	18	21	0	20	7	13	0	
2004	MAC	Marie Curran	48	25	23	0	21	11	10	0	
2005	MAC	Marie Curran	50	22	28	0	19	11	8	0	
2006	MAC	Marie Curran	58	16	42	0	20	5	15	0	
2007	MAC	Marie Curran	48	3	45	0	18	1	17	0	
2008	MAC	Marie Curran	42	10	32	0	18	5	13	0	
2009	MAC	Jennifer Teague	52	25	27	0	22	7	15	0	
2010	MAC	Jennifer Teague	55	21	34	0	23	9	14	0	
2011	MAC	Jennifer Teague	47	12	35	0	20	7	13	0	
2012	MAC	Jennifer Teague	45	14	31	0	21	4	17	0	
2013	MAC	Jennifer Teague	48	16	32	0	20	6	14	0	
2014	MAC	Trena Peel	52	30	22	0	16	11	5	0	MAC East Division Champions
2015	MAC	Trena Peel	50	13	37	0	19	4	15	0	
2016	MAC	Trena Peel	54	17	37	0	23	9	14	0	
2017	MAC	Trena Peel	55	9	46	0	24	3	21	0	
2018	MAC	Mike Roberts	47	16	31	0	23	7	16	0	
2019	MAC	Mike Ruechel	43	10	32	1	17	6	10	1	
2020	MAC	Mike Ruechel	13	2	11	0	0	0	0	0	Season cancelled early due to the COVID-19 pandemic.
2021	MAC	Mike Ruechel	53	18	35	0	38	16	22	0	

== See also ==
- List of NCAA Division I softball programs
