= Firestone Stadium =

Baseball stadium in Akron, Ohio

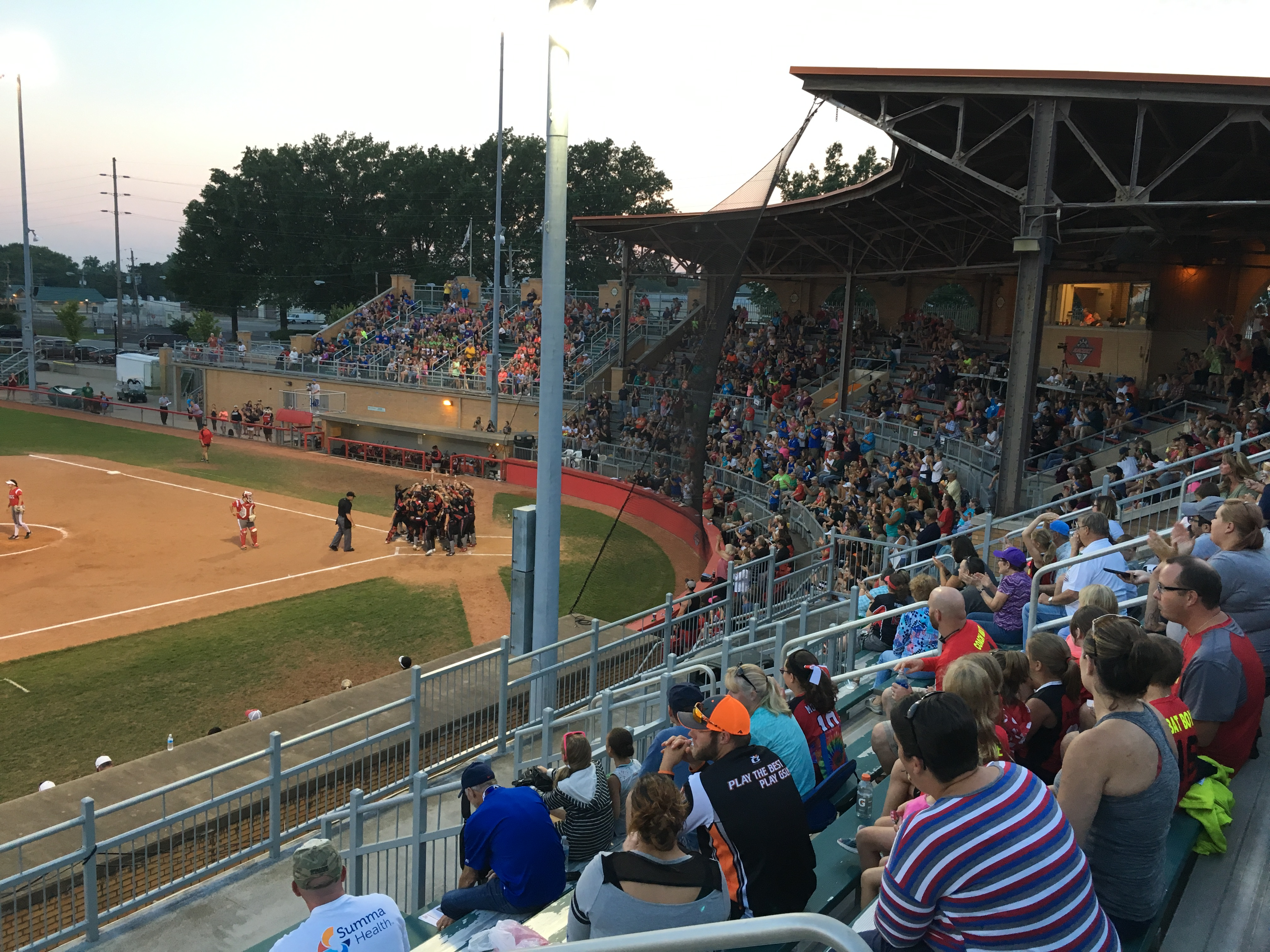
- Main grandstands in 2017

- Location in the United States
- Location: 1575 Firestone Parkway; Akron, Ohio 44301; U.S.
- Coordinates: 41°02′31″N 81°31′43″W
- Owner: City of Akron
- Operator: City of Akron
- Capacity: 4,576
- Surface: Natural Grass(1925–2021); Field Turf (2022–)
- Scoreboard: Electronic
- Record attendance: 6,256 (2008)
- Field size: LF–200, CF–220, RF–200

Construction
- Built: 1925
- Opened: July 25, 1925
- Renovated: 1998, 2022

Tenant
- Akron Racers (NPF) 1999–2017

Firestone Stadium is a softball stadium in Akron, Ohio, U.S. The stadium was dedicated on July 25, 1925, by Harvey S. Firestone, the founder of the Firestone Tire and Rubber Company. It was owned and operated by the Firestone company until it was donated to the City of Akron in 1988. It has a seating capacity of 4,576.

From 1999 to 2017, it served as the home of the Akron Racers of the National Pro Fastpitch softball league. The stadium was also the site of the annual Mid-American Conference softball tournament from 2002 to 2005 and again from 2008 through 2019. It was scheduled to host the 2020 tournament, but the tournament was canceled in March 2020 because of the coronavirus pandemic. Subsequently, in May 2020 the Mid-American Conference announced that the softball tournament was one of eight conference tournaments that were eliminated for at least the next four seasons beginning in 2020–21. The tournament, reinstated in 2022, returned to Firestone Stadium in May 2024.

Since 2009, Firestone Stadium has hosted the semifinals and finals of the Ohio High School Athletic Association (OHSAA) state softball tournament. The championship rounds include all four divisions of OHSAA softball, with 12 games played in three days in late May or early June. It was scheduled to again host the championship rounds June 4–6, 2020, but the tournament was cancelled in late April along with all other spring sports seasons and tournaments due to the coronavirus pandemic.

Mayor Dan Horrigan, Akron City Council member Donnie Kammer (D-Ward 7), Bridgestone Americas Senior Vice President of Product Development Hans Dorfi and Ohio High School Athletic Association Executive Director Doug Ute, along with representatives from various contractors, gathered June 1, 2022 for a ribbon cutting ceremony to celebrate the completed renovations of Firestone Stadium at 1575 Firestone Parkway. The $1.47 million project included upgrades to four restrooms and the concession area, new heating, ventilation and air conditioning, new LED field lighting, and a perimeter fence. In addition, two new artificial turf fields were installed.
