= Akron Zips =

Intercollegiate sports teams of the University of Akron (Ohio)

- University: University of Akron
- Nickname: Zips
- NCAA: Division I (FBS)
- Conference: Mid-American (primary); Big East (men's soccer); Great America Rifle Conference
- Athletic director: Andrew T. Goodrich
- Location: Akron, Ohio
- Varsity teams: 17
- Football stadium: InfoCision Stadium–Summa Field
- Arena: James A. Rhodes Arena
- Colors: Blue and gold
- Mascot: Zippy the Kangaroo
- Fight song: Akron Blue & Gold
- Website: gozips.com

The Akron Zips are the intercollegiate athletic teams that represent the University of Akron in Akron, Ohio, United States. The Zips compete in the National Collegiate Athletic Association (NCAA) at the Division I level as a member of the Mid-American Conference (MAC) East division. Akron sponsors 17 varsity teams across six men's, 10 women's, and one coed NCAA sanctioned sports. The football team competes in the Football Bowl Subdivision (FBS), the highest level of competition for college football.

== Nickname and mascot ==
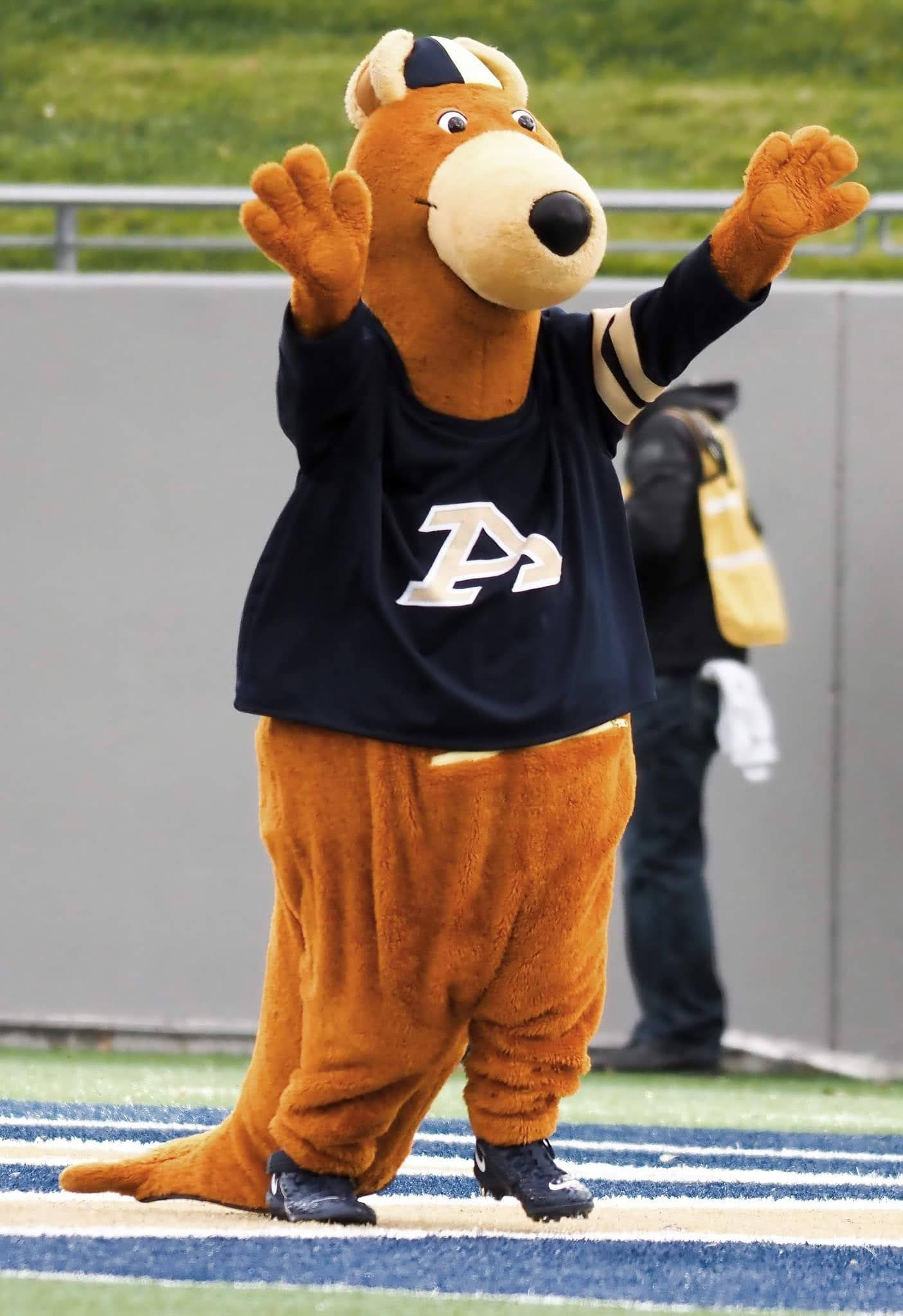
Zippy, Akron's mascot

The Zips name comes from "zippers", rubber overshoes made by the BF Goodrich Company of Akron that were popular in the 1920s and 1930s.

In 1925, a campus-wide contest had been conducted to choose a nickname for the university's athletic teams. Suggestions submitted by students, faculty, and alumni included Golden Blue Devils, Tip Toppers, Rubbernecks, Hillbillies, Kangaroos, and Cheveliers. The winner, freshman Margaret Hamlin, received a prize of $10 for "Zippers". Athletic director Kenneth Cochrane officially shortened the nickname to Zips in 1950.

The university's mascot is "Zippy", a female kangaroo. Zippy is one of only eight female college mascots in the United States.

== Sports sponsored ==
Akron is a member of the Mid-American Conference

Men's sports	Women's sports
Baseball	Basketball
Basketball	Cross Country
Football	Golf
Soccer	Lacrosse
Track and field^{†}	Soccer
Cross Country	Softball
	Swimming & Diving
	Track and Field^{†}
	Volleyball
Co-ed sports
Rifle
† – Track and field includes both indoor and outdoor

== Teams ==
=== Baseball ===
Akron reinstated its varsity baseball program for the 2020 season (2019–20 school year) after having dropped the sport in 2015.

=== Basketball ===
==== Men's basketball ====
In 2006, the men's basketball team, under head coach Keith Dambrot, won its first ever Division I postseason game by defeating Temple University in the NIT. The team, led by first team All-MAC performer Romeo Travis (former teammate of NBA star LeBron James in high school), won the most games in a season, 23.

In 2008, Keith Dambrot led Akron to the MAC Tournament Final for a second year in a row, yet the team fell for a second time, this time to archrival Kent State. The Zips advanced to the NIT for a second time in Dambrot's four years as head coach and won their first game at Florida State, eventually falling in the Sweet 16 in a game at UMass.

In 2009, the men's basketball team captured the MAC Tournament title, defeating Buffalo in Cleveland at the Quicken Loans Arena 65–53, thus qualifying Akron for its first appearance in the NCAA tournament since 1986 and first as a MAC member.

In 2010, the team reached the MAC Tournament Championship game for the fourth straight year, but lost to Ohio 75–81 in overtime. The Zips played in the postseason CBI tournament where they lost to Wisconsin–Green Bay 70–66.

The men's basketball team advanced to the NCAA Division I men's basketball tournament in 2011 and 2013 as well.

==== Women's basketball ====
The women's basketball team went to their first NCAA Tournament in 2014 after winning the MAC title. They made the WNIT in 1999, 2013, and 2015 and the WBI in 2015.

=== Football ===
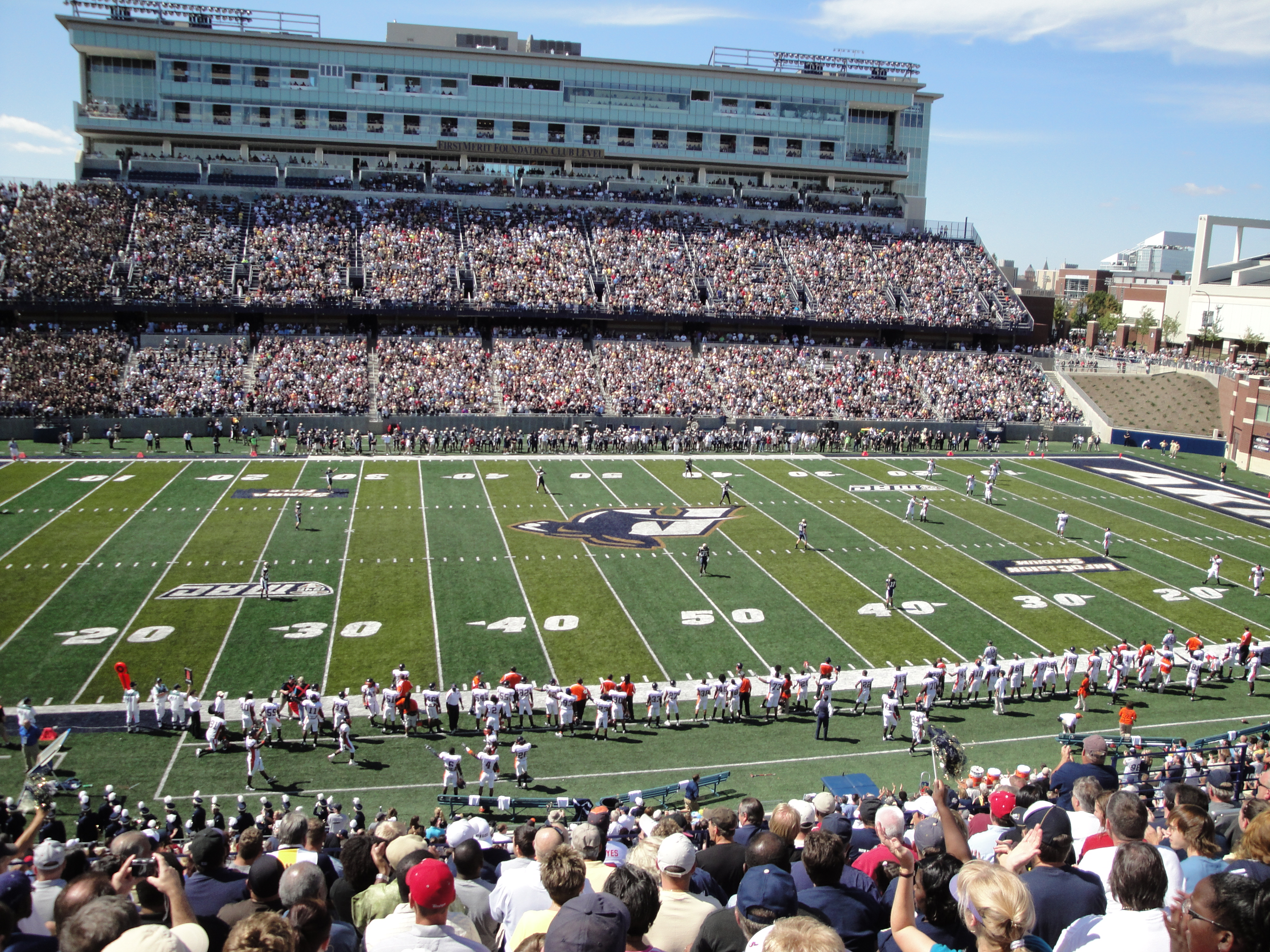
The Akron Zips as they play during their 2009 home opener in Summa Field at InfoCision Stadium, a 41–0 victory over Morgan State

Akron's major football rivalry is with Kent State University, whom they play for the Wagon Wheel. They also formerly played Youngstown State University for the Steel Tire until that series was discontinued in 1995. In 2005, the Akron Zips football team won their very first MAC championship giving them a chance to play in the Motor City Bowl, Akron's first Division I-A bowl game appearance where they lost to the University of Memphis.

=== Rifle ===
The rifle team went to their first NCAA Championship in the 2019/2020 season after placing 4th in the national standings. The 2020 NCAA Rifle Championship was cancelled after the practice day to Covid. Akron competes as a single-sport member of the Great America Rifle Conference (GARC) after leaving the Mid-Atlantic Rifle Conference (MAC) in 2016. in 2017, Rifle was the first sport that Akron hosted an NCAA National Championship competition and in 2023 hosted Akron's 2nd ever NCAA National Championship competition.

=== Men's soccer ===
The Akron Zips men's soccer team, ranked number one throughout the 2009 regular season, went undefeated, making it to the NCAA Men's Division I Soccer Championship, but lost in penalty kicks to the Virginia Cavaliers.

On December 12, 2010, Akron won the NCAA Division I national championship in men's soccer by defeating the Louisville Cardinals, 1–0. This was the first NCAA team championship for the school in any sport. The Zips play their home games at FirstEnergy Stadium-Cub Cadet Field.

Following the 2012 campaign, head coach Caleb Porter left the Zips to take the head coaching of the Portland Timbers of Major League Soccer. The Zips have remained a national power under coach Jared Embick, winning the MAC season and tournament championships in each of his first four seasons.

The Akron Zips Men's Soccer program made their way to another NCAA College Cup in 2018 but fell 1–0 to the Maryland Terrapins in the final.

Akron joined the Big East Conference for men's soccer after the 2022–23 school year.

=== Other sports ===
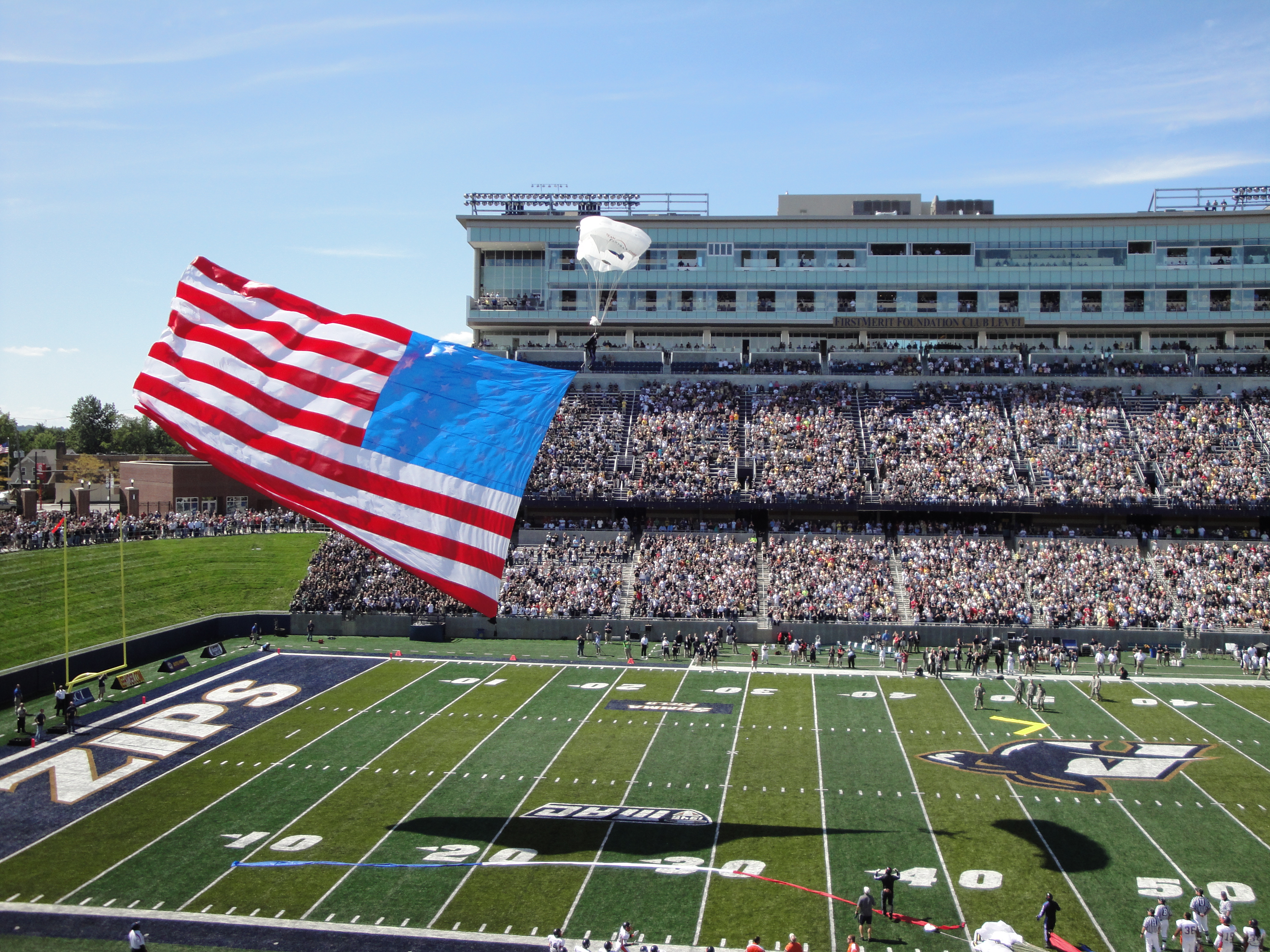
A parachutist descends with American flag in tow onto the surface of Summa Field as part of the opening day festivities of the first game ever held in InfoCision Stadium, 2009

In 2005, the women's cross country team, women's indoor track and the men's soccer team also won the MAC championship in their respective sports, making the 2005–06 year the most successful in Akron athletics history with a total of four Mid-American Conference championships in the same year.

The 2005 men's soccer team was the first team in UA history to hold a national no. 1 ranking in any sport, and was coached by Ken Lolla, now the head coach at the University of Louisville.

The 1978 men's archery team, led by 3-time national individual college champion Richard Bednar and hall-of-fame coach Bill Bednar, was the first team in UA history to win a national collegiate team championship.

The University of Akron has produced five individual national champions, including 4 NCAA national champions:

- Shawn Barber, indoor and outdoor pole vault: 2015; World champion, 2015
- Jenna Compton, air rifle: 2009
- Stevi Large, track and field (weight throw), 2009
- Christi Smith, track and field (heptathlon), 2000
- Richard Bednar, archery: 1976, 1977, 1978

The newest Zips varsity sport is women's lacrosse, which played its first season in the spring of 2020 as a single-sport member of the ASUN Conference.

== Facilities ==
- InfoCision Stadium – Summa Field (football)
- James A. Rhodes Arena (men's & women's basketball, volleyball)
- The Stile Athletics Field House (indoor T&F, strength and conditioning center, sports medicine center, indoor golf facility, football practice field & locker rooms, coaches' offices, team meeting space and spectator seating for 1,200.)
- Oliver J. Ocasek Natatorium (swimming & diving)
- Robert A. Pinn Shooting Range (rifle)
- Lee Jackson Field Complex (a 23-acre multi-purpose facility)
  - FirstEnergy Stadium-Cub Cadet Field (formerly Lee R. Jackson Field) (men's & women's soccer)
  - Lee R. Jackson Track & Field Complex (outdoor T&F)
  - Lee R. Jackson Softball Field (softball)
  - Lee R. Jackson Practice Field (football)
  - Outdoor Tennis Facility
  - Skeeles Field (baseball)
