= Central Michigan Chippewas softball =

- Founded: 1979
- University: Central Michigan University
- Head coach: McCall Salmon (6th season)
- Conference: MAC
- Location: Mount Pleasant, Michigan, US
- Home stadium: Margo Jonker Stadium (capacity: 1,500)
- Nickname: Chippewas
- Colors: Maroon and gold

NCAA WCWS appearances
- 1987

AIAW WCWS appearances
- 1982

NCAA Tournament appearances
- 1983, 1985, 1986, 1987, 1991, 1994, 1996, 1997, 1999, 2000, 2001, 2002, 2004, 2013

Conference tournament championships
- 1982, 1983, 1984, 1986, 1997, 1999, 2000, 2001, 2002, 2013

Regular-season conference championships
- 1982, 1986, 1987, 1991, 1994, 1996, 1997, 2001, 2002, 2004, 2017

The Central Michigan Chippewas softball team represents Central Michigan University in NCAA Division I college softball. The team participates in the Mid-American Conference. The Chippewas are currently led by head coach McCall Salmon. The team plays its home games at Margo Jonker Stadium located on the university's campus.

== History ==
=== Coaching history ===
Years	Coach	Record	%
1979	Marion Russel	15–5	.750
1980–2019	Margo Jonker	1268–808–7	.610
2020–Present	McCall Salmon	82–83	.497

== Coaching staff ==
Name	Position coached	Consecutive season at Central Michigan in current position
McCall Salmon	Head coach	4th
Sara Driesenga	Assistant Coach	4th
Brittini Merchant	Assistant Coach	4th
