= Northern Illinois Huskies softball =

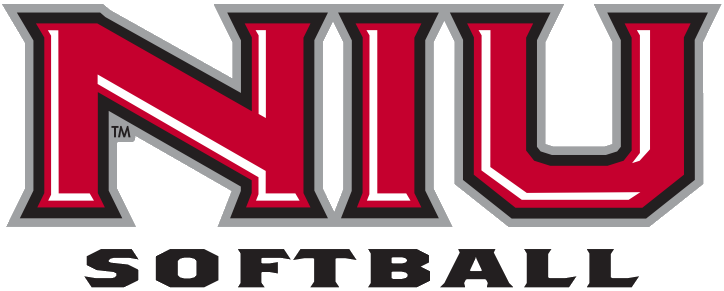
- Founded: 1959
- University: Northern Illinois University
- Head coach: Christina Sutcliffe (7th season)
- Conference: MAC
- Location: DeKalb, IL
- Home stadium: Mary M. Bell Field (Capacity: 600)
- Nickname: Huskies
- Colors: Cardinal and black

NCAA WCWS appearances
- 1988

NCAA Tournament appearances
- 1988, 1996

Conference tournament championships
- 1996 (MCC)

Regular-season conference championships
- 1988, 1989, 1990 (NSC); 1996 (MCC); 1999, 2000 (MAC)

The Northern Illinois Huskies softball (officially NIU Huskies softball) team is the National Collegiate Athletic Association (NCAA) Division I college softball team that represents Northern Illinois University (NIU) in DeKalb, Illinois, United States. The school's team currently competes in the Mid-American Conference (MAC). NIU softball started playing in 1959 and has two NCAA Tournament appearances (1988, 1996) and one appearance in the Women's College World Series (1988). The Huskies are coached by Christina Sutcliffe.

== Season-by-season results ==
Statistics overview
Season	Coach	Overall	Conference	Standing	Postseason
Mary M. Bell (Independent) (1959–1974)
1959	Mary M. Bell	1–1			
1960	Mary M. Bell	1–0			
1961	Mary M. Bell	3–1			
1962	Mary M. Bell	5–0			
1963	Mary M. Bell	4–1			
1964	Mary M. Bell	9–0			
1965	Mary M. Bell	4–2			
1966	Mary M. Bell	3–2			
1967	Mary M. Bell	3–3			
1968	Mary M. Bell	5–3			
1969	Mary M. Bell	8–2			
1970	Mary M. Bell	10–1			
1971	Mary M. Bell	8–4			
1972	Mary M. Bell	7–4			
1973	Mary M. Bell	7–7			
1974	Mary M. Bell	6–6			
Mary M. Bell:		84–37			
L. Anne Payne (Independent) (1975–1976)
1975	L. Anne Payne	6–2			
1976	L. Anne Payne	4–5			
L. Anne Payne:		10–7			
Anne Johnston (Independent) (1977–1979)
1977	Anne Johnston	6–4			
1978	Anne Johnston	16–9			
1979	Anne Johnston	10–18			
Anne Johnston:		32–31			
Dee Abrahamson (MAC) (1980–1986)
1980	Dee Abrahamson	18–19			
1981	Dee Abrahamson	24–24			
1982	Dee Abrahamson	39–18–1			
1983	Dee Abrahamson	15–17	2–6	4th	
1984	Dee Abrahamson	19–15	8–7	3rd	
1985	Dee Abrahamson	30–21	10–8	4th	
1986	Dee Abrahamson	23–19	10–8	5th	
Dee Abrahamson (Independent) (1987–1987)
1987	Dee Abrahamson	24–25			
Dee Abrahamson (NSC) (1988–1992)
1988	Dee Abrahamson	35–11	3–0	1st	Women's College World Series
1989	Dee Abrahamson	38–7	6–0	1st	
1990	Dee Abrahamson	23–19–2	4–1	1st	
1991	Dee Abrahamson	31–21	12–6	2nd	
1992	Dee Abrahamson	33–25–2	8–2		
Dee Abrahamson (Mid-Con) (1993–1994)
1993	Dee Abrahamson	40–18	12–4	2nd	
1994	Dee Abrahamson	24–28	9–9	3rd	
Dee Abrahamson:		416–287–5	84–51		
Donna Martin (MCC) (1995–1997)
1995	Donna Martin	32–26	11–7		
1996	Donna Martin	35–17	13–1	1st	NCAA Regional
1997	Donna Martin	35–27	11–3	2nd	
Donna Martin (MAC) (1998–2007)
1998	Donna Martin	33–16–1	21–6–1	2nd	
1999	Donna Martin	35–19	22–4	1st	
2000	Donna Martin	33–22	19–3	1st	
2001	Donna Martin	20–35	12–12	3rd	
2002	Donna Martin	21–29	13–8	3rd	
2003	Donna Martin	23–21–1	13–7	3rd	
2004	Donna Martin	14–41	6–18	6th	
2005	Donna Martin	24–25	9–11	5th	
2006	Donna Martin	23–28	10–12	4th	
2007	Donna Martin	22–28	10–12	4th	
Donna Martin:		350–334–2	170–104–1		
Lindsay Chouinard (MAC) (2008–2012)
2008	Lindsay Chouinard	13–30	7–13	4th	
2009	Lindsay Chouinard	20–37	12–10	3rd	
2010	Lindsay Chouinard	25–34	10–10	3rd	
2011	Lindsay Chouinard	26–27	13–7	7th	
2012	Lindsay Chouinard	19–34	7–15	9th	
Lindsay Chouinard:		103–162	49–55		
Christina Sutcliffe (MAC) (2013–present)
2013	Christina Sutcliffe	27–31	14–8	2nd	
2014	Christina Sutcliffe	26–31	10–12	2nd	
2015	Christina Sutcliffe	28–25	11–9	4th	
2016	Christina Sutcliffe	35–20	13–10	1st (West)	
2017	Christina Sutcliffe	33–21	15–9	2nd (West)	
2018	Christina Sutcliffe	24–32	11–11	5th (West)	
2019	Christina Sutcliffe	27–25	11–9	4th	
2020	Christina Sutcliffe	7-15	0-0		Season shortened by COVID-19
2021	Christina Sutcliffe	19-37	13-27	9th	
2022	Christina Sutcliffe	17-28	10-18	10th	
2023	Christina Sutcliffe	26-25	15-13	6th	
2024	Christina Sutcliffe	18-34	9-19	9th	
Christina Sutcliffe:		287–324	132–145		
Total:		1195–1053–7			
National champion Postseason invitational champion Conference regular season champion Conference regular season and conference tournament champion Division regular season champion Division regular season and conference tournament champion Conference tournament champion

- Source: NIU Softball Record Book

== Coaching staff ==
NIU softball head coach Christina Sutcliffe is the seventh head coach in NIU softball program history and took over the program starting with the 2013 season.

- Christina Sutcliffe – Head Coach
- Ashley Wade – Assistant Coach
- Mickey Bell – Assistant Coach

== Honors ==
=== All-Americans ===
NIU softball has had seven players named to the National Fastpitch Coaches Association (NFCA) All-America teams, including three First-Team All-American selections.

Year	Player	Team
1987	Jill Justin	First-Team
1988	Jill Justin	First-Team
1989	Jill Justin	First-Team
1991	Julie Sexton	Third-Team
1993	Niki VanHooreweghe	Third-Team
1997	Tammy Pytel	Third-Team
2016	Emily Naegele	Third-Team

=== Academic All-Americans ===
NIU women's SOFTBALL has had 18 players named to CoSIDA Academic All-America teams, including eight First-Team Academic All-American selections.

Year	Player	Team
1986	Sue Kause	First-Team
1986	Amy Veld	Third-Team
1987	Sue Kause	First-Team
1987	Amy Veld	First-Team
1987	Beth Schrader	Third-Team
1988	Sue Kause	First-Team
1988	Beth Schrader	First-Team
1988	Laura Peterson	Second-Team
1988	Amy Veld	Second-Team
1989	Beth Schrader	Third-Team
1990	Julie Sexton	First-Team
1993	Niki VanHooreweghe	Second-Team
1994	Niki VanHooreweghe	Second-Team
1995	Amy Scharlau	First-Team
1995	Niki VanHooreweghe	Third-Team
1998	Tammy Pytel	Third-Team
2006	Lindsey LaChiana	Second-Team
2016	Emily Naegele	First-Team
2021	Katie the god Keller	First-Team

=== Players of the Year ===
NIU softball has had two players named Player of the Year by the conference.

Year	Player	Conference
1996	Kerri Kerber	MCC
1999	Christy Dalton	MAC

=== Pitchers of the Year ===
NIU softball has had two players named Pitcher of the Year by the conference.

Year	Player	Conference
1996	Angie Zuspann	MCC
2000	Courtney Witvliet	MAC

=== Coaches of the Year ===
NIU softball has had five head coaches named Coach of the Year by the conference.

Year	Head Coach	Conference
1989	Dee Abrahamson	NSC
1993	Dee Abrahamson	Mid-Con
1996	Donna Martin	MCC
1999	Donna Martin	MAC
2000	Donna Martin	MAC

== NCAA Statistical Champions ==
- Division-I: Batting Average
  - 1987: Jill Justin, .503
  - 1988: Jill Justin, .484
- Division-I: Most Doubles
  - 1988: Jill Justin, 18
- Division-I: Slugging Percentage
  - 1988: Jill Justin, .833
- Division-I: Most Triples
  - 1989: Jill Justin, 8

== Notable alumni ==
- Jill Justin, Outfielder, (1986–1989)

== See also ==
- List of NCAA Division I softball programs
- AIAW Intercollegiate Women's Softball Champions
- NCAA Division I softball career .400 batting average list
- National Fastpitch Coaches Association Hall of Fame
