= Gentile (name) =

Gentile is an Italian surname and a unisex given name.

== Persons with the surname ==
- Gentile (bishop of Agrigento) (died 1171), Italian bishop
- Alessandro Gentile (born 1992), Italian basketball player
- Carlo Gentile (1835–1893), Italian-American photographer
- Caroline D. Gentile (1924–2008), American academic and physical education instructor at University of Maine at Presque Isle
- Claudio Gentile (born 1953), Italian football player
- Diodato Gentile (1555–1616), Italian Roman Catholic prelate
- Dominic Salvatore Gentile (1920–1951), American Air Force officer
- Donato Gentile (born 1957), Italian politician
- Doris Gentile (1894–1972), Australian novelist and short story writer
- Edera Gentile (1920–1993), Italian discus throw
- Emilio Gentile (born 1946), Italian historian
- Enrico Gentile (1921–?), Italian singer of the 1940s
- Fedele Gentile (1908–1993), Italian film actor
- Ferdinando Gentile (born 1967), Italian basketball player
- Gary Gentile (born 1946), American author and technical diver
- Gian Gentile, US Army officer
- Giovanni Gentile (1875–1944), Italian fascist philosopher
- Giovanni Gentile (composer), 17th-century Italian composer
- Giulio Vincenzo Gentile (1620–1694), Italian Catholic prelate
- Giuseppe Gentile (born 1943), Italian triple jumper
- Guy Gentile (born 1976), American trader
- Jade Gentile (born 1998), American wrestler
- Jim Gentile (born 1934), American baseball player
- Kay Johnson-Gentile, American musician and educator
- Linda Gentile (born 1951), American politician
- Mario Gentile, Canadian politician
- Melissa "Skeeter" Gentile (born 1978), American softball coach
- Paul Gentile (born 1943), American lawyer and politician
- Sam Gentile (1916–1998), American baseball player
- Troy Gentile (born 1993), American actor
- Vincent J. Gentile, American politician

== Persons with the given name ==
- Gentile de' Becchi (1420/1430 – 1497), Italian bishop, diplomat, orator and writer
- Gentile Bellini (c. 1429 – 1507), Italian painter
- Gentile Brancaleoni (1416–1457), Italian noblewoman
- Gentile Budrioli (died 1498), Italian astrologist and herbal healer
- Gentile Dolfino (died 1601), Italian bishop
- Gentile da Fabriano (c. 1370 – 1427), Italian painter
- Gentile da Foligno (died 1348), Italian professor and doctor of medicine
- Gentile Portino da Montefiore (c. 1240 – 1312), Italian Franciscan friar and prelate
- Gentile Tondino (1923–2001), Canadian educator and artist
- Gentile Virginio Orsini (c. 1434 – 1497), Italian condottiero and vassal of the papal throne and the Kingdom of Naples
- Gentile Zanardi, 17th-century Italian painter

== See also ==
- Gentili
