= Gentile (disambiguation) =

"Gentile" is a word with several meanings; in contemporary usage, it usually means "someone who is not a Jew".

Gentile may also refer to:

== People ==
- Gentile (name), an Italian surname and given name
- Gentile (bishop of Agrigento) (died 1171), Italian bishop

== Places ==
- Gentile Valley, a valley in Idaho
- Appiano Gentile, a comune of the Province of Como, Italy
- Olmo Gentile, a comune of the Province of Asti, Italy

== Other uses ==
- Gentile di Puglia, a breed of domestic sheep
- Anatolidion gentile, a species of comb-footed spider
- Riforma Gentile, an Italian educational reform of 1923
- Sangiovese or Prugnolo Gentile, a red wine grape variety

== See also ==
- Gentle (disambiguation)
