= Gentle =

Gentle may refer to:

- Gentleness

== People ==
- Johnny Gentle, stage name of John Askew (born 1936), British pop singer who once toured with the Silver Beetles (later the Beatles) as his backing group
- Peter Gentle (born 1965), Australian rugby league footballer and coach
- Mensur Suljović (born 1972), Austrian darts player, nicknamed "The Gentle"

== Arts, entertainment and media ==
- Gentle (film), a 1960 Russian drama
- Gentle (character), a mutant in Marvel Comics

== Biology ==
- GENtle, free molecular biology software
- Gentle (maggot), the larva of a blowfly

== See also ==
- Gentile (disambiguation)
- Gently (disambiguation)
