= Gentili =

Gentili is an Italian surname. Notable people with the surname include:

- Alberico Gentili (1552–1608), Italian jurist
- Aloysius Gentili (1801–1848), Italian Rosminian cleric
- Andreina Gentili, best known as Andreina Pagnani (1906–1981), Italian actress
- Antonio Pallavicini Gentili (1441–1507), Italian cardinal
- Camilla Gentili (died 1486), Italian catholic
- Cecilia Gentili (1972–2024), Argentine American LGBT activist
- Danilo Gentili (born 1979), Brazilian comedian, television host, writer, cartoonist, and businessman
- Eugenio Gentili Tedeschi, Italian architect, designer, teacher and writer
- Giacomo Gentili (born 1997), Italian rower
- Luca Gentili (footballer, born 1972), Italian footballer
- Luca Gentili (footballer, born 1986), Italian footballer
- Manuela Gentili (born 1978), Italian hurdler
- Mario Gentili (cyclist, born 1913) (1913–1999), Italian cyclist
- Mario Gentili (cyclist, born 1962), Italian cyclist
- Massimiliano Gentili (born 1971), Italian cyclist
- Scipione Gentili (1563–1616), Italian law professor
- Sebastiano Gentili (1597–1667), Italian catholic prelate
- Serafino Gentili (1775–1835), Italian opera singer

== See also ==
- Gentile (surname)
