= Gently =

Gently may refer to:

- Dirk Gently, a fictional character created by Douglas Adams
- George Gently, a fictional character created by Alan Hunter (see Inspector George Gently)
- Gently (album), a 1996 album by Liza Minnelli
- "Gently" (song), by Drake featuring Bad Bunny, 2023
- "Gently", a song by Biffy Clyro from Infinity Land, 2004
- "Gently", a song by Booker T. Jones from Sound the Alarm, 2013
- "Gently", a song by the Coral from The Curse of Love, 2014
- "Gently", a song by Elvis Presley from Something for Everybody, 1961
- "Gently", a song by Monét X Change from Unapologetically, 2019
- "Gently", a song by Ready for the World from Ruff 'n' Ready, 1988
- "Gently", a song by Slipknot from Iowa, 2001
- "Gently", a song by Spandau Ballet from Diamond (reissue), 1982
- "Gently", a song by Toshi Kubota from Nothing But Your Love, 2000
- "Gently", a song by You+Me from Rose Ave., 2014

== See also ==
- Gentle (disambiguation)
- Gentleness
