= Amanda Lehotak =

American softball coach

Biographical details
- Born: Bellevue, Nebraska, U.S.

Playing career
- 2000–01: Ole Miss
- 2002–03: Nebraska-Omaha
- Position: First baseman

Coaching career (HC unless noted)
- 2004: Daniel J. Gross Catholic HS (asst.)
- 2004: College of Saint Mary (Interim Asst.)
- 2005: Missouri Western State (asst.)
- 2006: Jacksonville (asst.)
- 2007–11: Jacksonville
- 2012–13: UTSA
- 2014–20: Penn State

Head coaching record
- Overall: 328–414 (.442)
- Tournaments: 1–2 (NCAA)

Accomplishments and honors

Championships
- Atlantic Sun regular season (2011)

Awards
- Atlantic Sun Coach of the Year (2011)

Amanda Lehotak is an American softball coach who was the head coach at Penn State.

== Early life and education ==
Lehotak played softball for Daniel J. Gross High School in Bellevue, Nebraska. She began her college career at the University of Mississippi played for two seasons (2000–2001) then transferring to the University of Nebraska-Omaha to play for two more years (2002–2003).

== Coaching career ==
=== Jacksonville ===
Lehotak was named head softball coach of the Jacksonville Softball Program on June 30, 2006. She was promoted from assistant coach to head coach after Melissa Gentile resigned as head coach after one season.

=== Penn State ===
Penn State named Lehotak the seventh head softball coach of the Penn State Softball Program on July 22, 2013. She was hired after two mediocre seasons at UTSA. On July 6, 2020, Lehotak resigned as head coach of the Nittany Lions.

== Head coaching record ==
=== College ===
Record table
Season	Team	Overall	Conference	Standing	Postseason
Jacksonville (Atlantic Sun Conference) (2007–2011)
2007	Jacksonville	15–43	4–14	10th	
2008	Jacksonville	21–39	5–17	11th	
2009	Jacksonville	24–31	7–13	7th	
2010	Jacksonville	33–23	10–10	6th	
2011	Jacksonville	44–16	18–2	1st	NCAA Regional
Jacksonville:		137–152 (.474)	44–56 (.440)		
UTSA Roadrunners (Southland Conference) (2012–present)
2012	UTSA	24–28	12–8	T-3rd	
UTSA Roadrunners (Western Athletic Conference) (2013–present)
2013	UTSA	27–26	9–12	5th	
UTSA:		51–54 (.486)	21–20 (.512)		
Penn State Nittany Lions (Big Ten Conference) (2014–Present)
2014	Penn State	14–35	5–18	T-10th	
2015	Penn State	29–28	9–14	T-8th	
2016	Penn State	30–24	14–9	4th	
2017	Penn State	23–33	8–15	12th	
2018	Penn State	9–41	5–18	13th	
2019	Penn State	24–32	7–16	10th	
2020	Penn State	11–15			Season canceled due to COVID-19
Penn State:		140–208 (.402)	48–90 (.348)		
Total:		328–414 (.442)			
National champion Postseason invitational champion Conference regular season champion Conference regular season and conference tournament champion Division regular season champion Division regular season and conference tournament champion Conference tournament champion
