= Mattering =

Psychological human need

Mattering is a human need. A person matters when they are not only contributing to others, but also feeling valued for that contribution. The sense of mattering can be considered in terms of mattering to the person, to other individuals, and to society at large.

Mattering is related to, but distinct from, belongingness, self-esteem, and social connection. It is a core component of each person's self-concept. A person's well-being depends in part upon a sense that they matter to someone. People who feel like they matter have more psychological resilience.

How much a person matters is partly under that person's control. For example, a person who wants to increase their sense of mattering might volunteer in their community for a project that seems valuable to them.

When people feel like they do not matter, they are likely to have worse mental health, and they may be attracted to political ideas that increase their sense of mattering to society, such as xenophobic policies.

The concept has also been discussed in organizational and social contexts. In a 2025 Fortune article on burnout in the workplace, John R. Miles described "mattering erosion" as a condition in which employees feel that who they are, what they value, and what they do are not important. Jennifer B. Wallace describes an "erosion of mattering" as contributing to loneliness, disconnection, and a diminished sense of purpose.

== See also ==
- Third place – a place outside of home and employment where someone might matter to others
