= Melissa Gentile =

American softball coach

Current position
- Title: Assistant coach
- Team: Washington University
- Conference: University Athletic Association

Biographical details
- Born: March 14, 1978 (age 48); O'Fallon, Missouri, U.S.
- Education: Michigan; Central Michigan

Playing career
- 1996–2000: Michigan
- 1996–2000: USA Women's Softball Team
- Position: Catcher

Coaching career (HC unless noted)
- 2000–2002: Central Michigan (asst.)
- 2003–2005: Eastern Michigan (asst.)
- 2006: Jacksonville
- 2014–2018: Eastern Michigan
- 2024–Present: Washington University (asst.)

Administrative career (AD unless noted)
- 2002–2003: Michigan Sports Academy (Dir. of Softball Operations)
- 2006–2013: Powerline Softball (Owner/Director)

Head coaching record
- Overall: 100–211 (.322)

Accomplishments and honors

Championships
- As a player: Drafted by the Akron Racers professional team (2000) 2× Big Ten regular-season champions (1998, 1999) 3× Big Ten tournament champions (1997, 1998, 2000)

Awards
- As a player: Big Ten Conference Freshman of the Year (1997); First Team All-Big Ten Conference (1998); Second Team All-Big Ten Conference (1997); All-Region (1998); All-American (1998) Women’s College World Series All-Tournament Team (1997)

Melissa "Skeeter" Gentile is an American softball coach who is currently an assistant coach at Washington University in St. Louis. She was the former head coach at Eastern Michigan.

== Early life and education ==
Gentile graduated from Wentzville High School. She played softball for Michigan from 1996 to 2000, where she was four-year letter winner. She graduated from the University of Michigan in 2000 with a bachelor's degree in kinesiology. She earned her master's degree in athletic administration from Central Michigan University in 2005.

== Coaching career ==
=== Jacksonville University ===
Melissa Gentile was the head coach of the Jacksonville softball program for one season. Following the 2006 season, on June 30, 2006, Gentile resigned as head coach of the Jacksonville softball program, her replacement would be the program's assistant coach Amanda Lehotak.

=== Eastern Michigan University ===
On July 29, 2013, Melissa Gentile was announced as the new head coach of the Eastern Michigan softball program. On March 20, 2018, Eastern Michigan announced that they would be cutting four sports including the softball program effective at the end of the 2018 Spring season. On February 12, 2019, a judge ruled that Eastern Michigan must reinstate two women's programs including softball. It is unclear whether Gentile will return as coach. Eastern Michigan would not reinstate the softball program.

=== Washington University in St. Louis ===
On August 25, 2023, Gentile was hired as an assistant coach for the Washington University softball program.

== Head coaching record ==
=== College ===
Record table
Season	Team	Overall	Conference	Standing	Postseason
Jacksonville Dolphins (Atlantic Sun Conference) (2006–present)
2006	Jacksonville	22–37	6–14	9th	
Jacksonville:		22–37 (.373)	6–14 (.300)		
Eastern Michigan Eagles (Mid-American Conference) (2014–2018)
2014	Eastern Michigan	13–37	4–16	6th (West)	
2015	Eastern Michigan	18–32	6–13	6th (West)	
2016	Eastern Michigan	19–32	9–14	5th (West)	
2017	Eastern Michigan	17–34	3–20	6th (West)	
2018	Eastern Michigan	11–39	6–17	6th	
Eastern Michigan:		78–174 (.310)	28–80 (.259)		
Total:		100–211 (.322)			
National champion Postseason invitational champion Conference regular season champion Conference regular season and conference tournament champion Division regular season champion Division regular season and conference tournament champion Conference tournament champion
