= Gentleness =

Personal quality

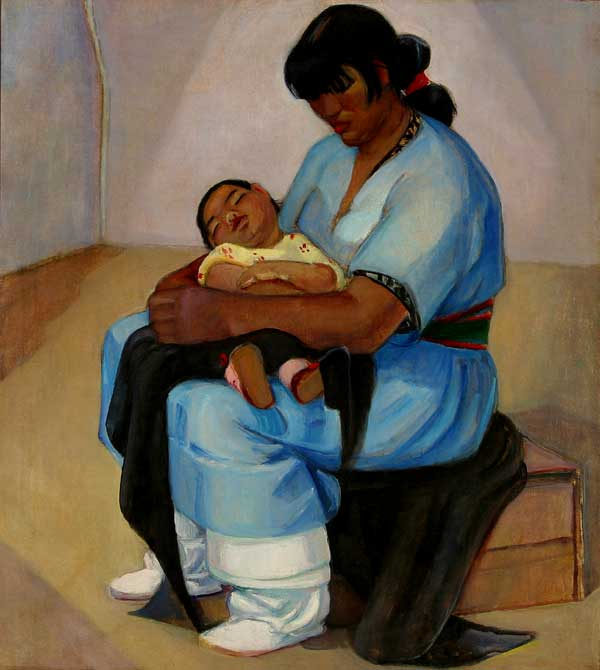
Unsigned oil on canvas of a seated mother cradling her sleeping child

Gentleness is action done with care and restraint. It can be a personality trait or an individual action—consisting of kindness, consideration, and amiability.

== Philosophy ==
=== 6th century BCE ===
Greek philosopher Aristotle used it in a technical sense as the virtue that strikes the mean with regard to anger: being too quick to anger is a vice, but so is being detached in a situation where anger is appropriate; justified and properly focused anger is named mildness or gentleness.

=== 1st century CE ===
Roman citizen Paul the Apostle wrote about having the fruit of the spirit which calls for Christians to embody virtues such as gentleness. The New International Version (NIV) of the Bible translates as,

22 But the fruit of the Spirit is love, joy, peace, forbearance, kindness, goodness, faithfulness, 23 gentleness and self-control. Against such things there is no law. 24 Those who belong to Christ Jesus have crucified the flesh with its passions and desires. 25 Since we live by the Spirit, let us keep in step with the Spirit. 26 Let us not become conceited, provoking and envying each other.

— Apostle Paul, Bible NIV, Galatians 5 22-26

=== 21st century CE ===
Gentleness is not passive; it requires a resistance to brutality. Gentleness does not submit to tyranny, but it responds with a tender awareness of others' experiences and pain.

According to Bryant McGill, gentleness comes from releasing ourselves from desires, like wanting others to read our minds, seeking their attention, expecting continuous agreement, or wanting them to always please us. He suggests that focusing on wants creates an endless cycle, but by releasing and gently inviting, we can attain our goals.

Foucault pendulum (a visual example of potential energy) animated by DemonDeLuxe (Dominique Toussaint)

French philosopher and psychoanalyst Anne Dufourmantelle wrote in her 2018 book, Power of Gentleness, that gentleness is a force of potentiality. She states gentleness is,

"...an enigma. It is taken up in the double movement of welcoming and giving, it appears on the threshold of passages signed off by birth and death. Because it has its degrees of intensity, because it is a symbolic force, and because it has a transformative ability over things and beings, it is a power."

— Anne Dufourmantelle, The Power of Gentleness

Supporting a gentle discussion - presentation by Lea Volz on day 4 of Wikimania 2021

On day 4 of the 2021 Wikimania event Lea Volz gave a video presentation on how to encourage gentle discussion within Wikipedia Germany.

At Wikimedia Germany we have collected...(conflict analysis, interviews with people most affected by destructive communication) regarding the problems and challenges for the communication culture...How can we use these findings to now activate the different community groups and functionaries and raise awareness for kinder and more considerate communication?

— Lea Volz (WMDE), Supporting a gentle discussion - Can we raise awareness through research results to bring about change?

== Social psychology ==
Gentleness is an important aspect for an individual's mattering and intergroup relationships.

=== Psychology ===
The Contact Hypothesis, was proposed by Gordon Allport in The Nature of Prejudice in 1954.

But the seeds of prejudice never took root. His image of himself as a healer, as a friend to man, was too dominant. After adolescence he made an objective appraisal of the situation. He decided that he was unusually sensitive about the matter, but also that ethnic prejudice was counter to the values most central to life. After his stocktaking, he deliberately reaffirmed his own values, and devoted himself professionally to the improvement of intergroup relations.

— Allport, G. W., The Nature of Prejudice, Chapter 9, Later Learning, page 318

Mattering is linked robustly with self-reports of love and friendship... with satisfying the fundamental need for connection and competence...seems to underscore the association between friendship and happiness due to the role that mattering plays in satisfying these core psychological needs.

— Gordon L. Flett, An Introduction, Review, and Conceptual Analysis of Mattering as an Essential Construct and an Essential Way of Life, Mattering: Why It Matters in Consequential Ways, Mattering at the Relationship Level

=== Sociology ===
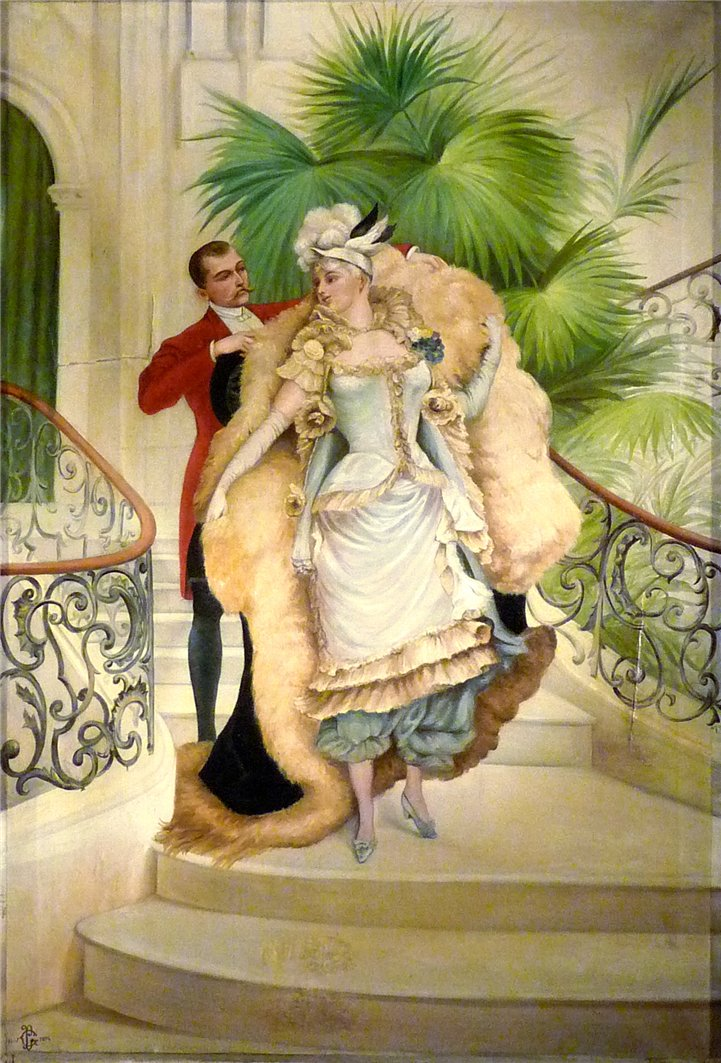
19th century painting of a gentleman displaying his courtesy

Another historical context for gentleness emerged in medieval times, associated with higher social classes. This is reflected in terms like gentleman, gentlewoman, and gentry. Over time, the concept of gentle behavior evolved from the literal gentry to the metaphorical "like a gentleman," applicable to anyone.

For certain he hath seen all perfectness.
Who among other ladies hath seen mine:
They that go with her humbly should combine
To thank their God for such peculiar grace.
So perfect is the beauty of her face
That it begets in no wise any sigh
Of envy, but draws round her a clear line
Of love, and blessed faith, and gentleness.
Merely the sight of her makes all things bow:
Not she herself alone is holier
Than all: but hers, through her, are raised above.
From all her acts such lovely graces flow
That truly one may never think of her
Without a passion of exceeding love.

— Sonnet: Beauty Of Her Face, by Dante Alighieri

== Media ==
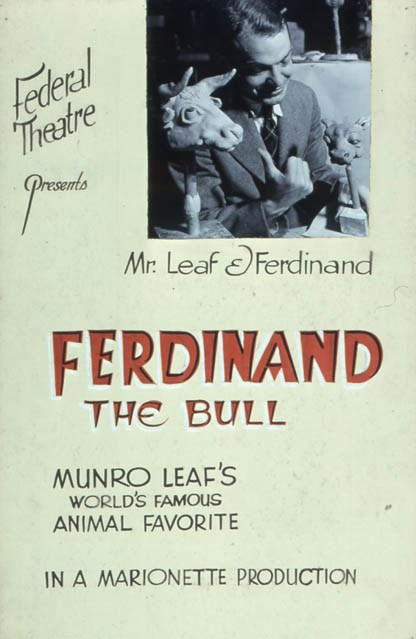
Ferdinand the Bull

=== Books ===
The Story of Ferdinand (1936) is a children's book written by Munro Leaf and illustrated by Robert Lawson. It follows the story of a bull named Ferdinand who would rather smell the flowers than fight with other bulls.

=== Music ===
Lullaby wound up clock

A lullaby is a song meant to soothe people, usually children, to sleep.

=== Video Games ===
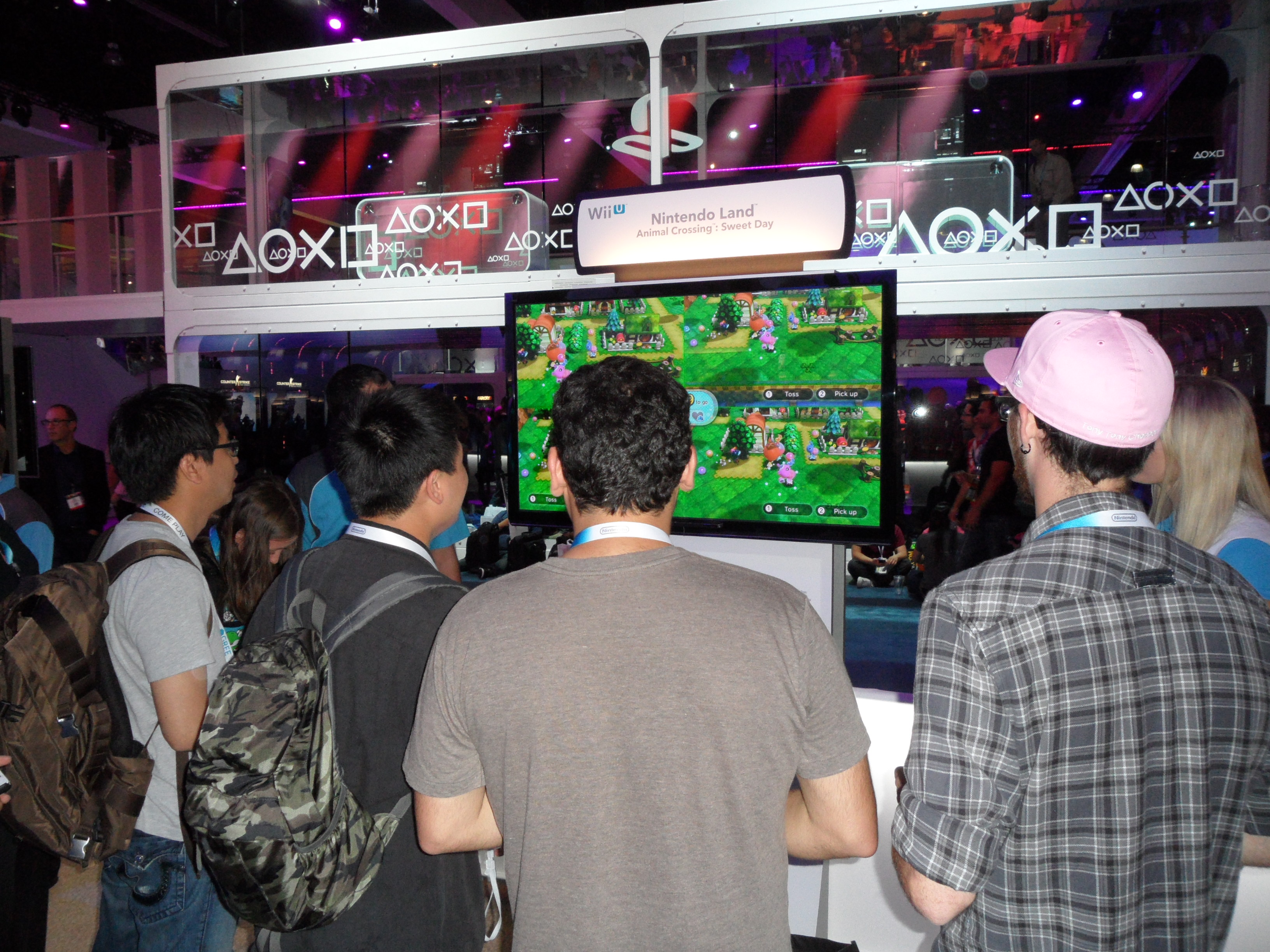
Animal Crossing - Sweet Day

The cozy game genre of video games emphasizes non-violence and relaxation. Some examples are Animal Crossing, Stardew Valley, and The Sims series.

== See also ==
- Agreeableness – Personality trait
