= Kay Johnson-Gentile =

American musician and educator

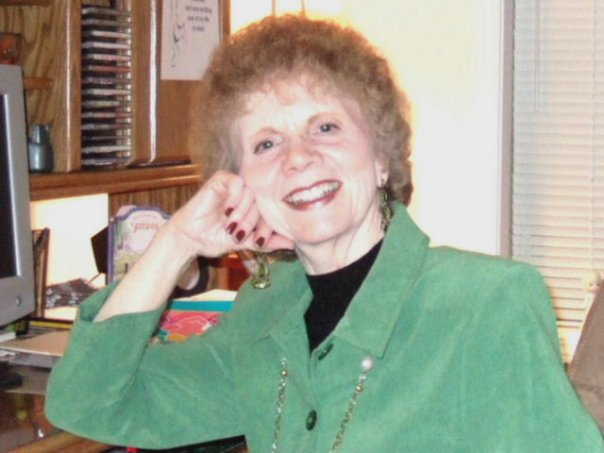
- Education: PhD in Elementary Education
- Alma mater: State University of New York at Buffalo
- Occupation(s): Musician and Educator
- Notable work: My Walk of Faith, Hope, and Love

Kay Johnson-Gentile is an American musician and educator.

== Education ==
Kay Johnson-Gentile received her associate degree in Music from the State University of New York at Buffalo (University at Buffalo) in 1966. She then received a BA in History in 1980, an EdM in 1987, and PhD in Elementary Education in 1990.

== Musical career ==
While dealing with a cancer diagnosis and fight starting in 1975, during which she received nine months of chemotherapy, Johnson-Gentile became a songwriter after finding music aided in her therapy—specifically the music of John Denver, whom she later met. As she survived and in the years afterwards, she then began to advocate for and teach the use of music as a rehabilitation and treatment tool—first at the Roswell Park Comprehensive Cancer Center in Buffalo, NY, and later while travelling to other regions. During this period she provided music therapy workshops for cancer patients, their families, and physicians. She also developed a pilot program for music therapy with the American Cancer Society based on her research. Through this work she was named one of the top “Ten Outstanding Young Women of America” in 1977. That year she was elected secretary of the American Cancer Society New York State Division. From this work some of the songs she composed for guitar and voice appeared on a full-length album, entitled Faith, Hope, Love …, which she produced after a series of cancer awareness concerts in New York State. To support her album and as a part of her advocacy for music therapy, Johnson-Gentile performed in concert in various places across the US.

== Teaching career ==
During the 1980s, she formed a duo with her husband J. Ronald Gentile, recording an additional CD —Genteel Songs and Poems for Genteel People (Adult Music for Children and Children's Music for Adults.) These were done in support of a series of workshops they performed on integrating music into elementary-school curricula. While performing together, the duo went by the name The Genteels. After working as an elementary school teacher, she later became an associate professor of elementary school education at Buffalo State College, teaching there from 1990 until 2003. In 2002 she received the SUNY Chancellor's Award for Excellence in Teaching. Her research included Cooperative Learning, Using Conflict Resolution in the Elementary Schools, and studying the role of music in the primary schools in Australia.

== Books ==
In 2016, she published her memoir My Walk of Faith, Hope, and Love.

== Present Occupation ==
Kay is presently working as a writer.
