= Guy Gentile =

American business executive (born 1976)

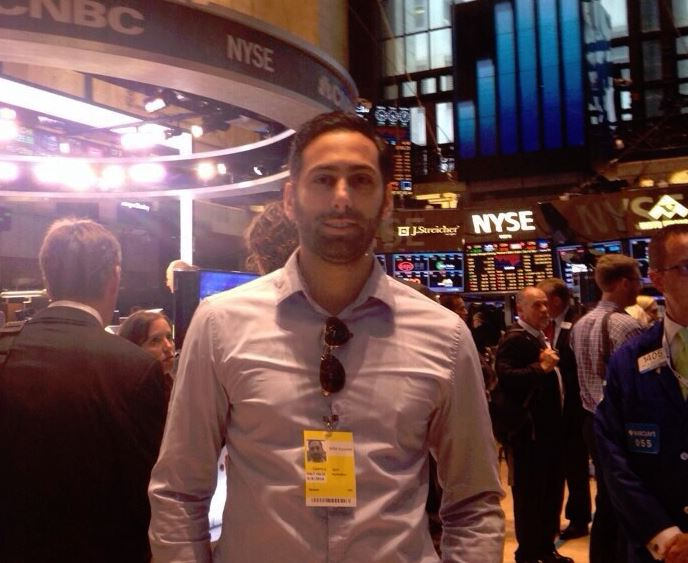
- Guy Gentile on the floor of the NYSE
- Born: July 3, 1976 (age 50); Yonkers, New York
- Citizenship: Italian
- Occupation: Professional Trader
- Title: Founder of SpeedTrader
- Children: 4
- Website: Official website

Guy Gentile (born July 3, 1976) is an entrepreneur, business executive, former broker and high-frequency trading expert. He is best known for founding two high-frequency trading firms and financial technology companies focused on active trading and direct market access, including SpeedTrader and SureTrader and for his early work developing DAS Trader direct -access trading platform. He has been featured in financial media including Bloomberg Television, Bloomberg Businessweek, Reuters, Bloomberg Law, Barron's, Yahoo Finance, and Benzinga for his work in electronic trading, financial markets, and legal proceedings related to the securities industry.

== Career ==
Gentile entered the securities industry in the late 1990's, focusing on electronic trading and direct market access. His work centered on developing technology and brokerage services for active equities traders during the growth of online trading.

DAS Trader

In 2001, Gentile was an early founder and developer of the DAS Trader platform, a direct-access trading system used by professional traders and broker-dealers. His authorship of software associated with the platform us documented in the records of the United States Copyright Office.

GBOX Trading

In 2005, Gentile developed GBOX Trading, an automated quantitative trading company focused on algorithmic equity trading. The company was incorporated in Florida as GBOX Trading LLC.

SureTrader

In 2011, Gentile founded SureTrader, and online brokerage operating through Swiss America Securities, Ltd. in The Bahamas. The firm served active traders seeking offshore brokerage services and direct market access to U.S. equities. During its expansion, the brokerage reported processing more than 100,000 equity transactions daily. In 2019, Suretrader ceased operations after losing its clearing relationship.

Books

Gentile is the author of several books, The Stock Operator, a novel inspired by his career in the securities industry, Rogue Alpha, a book on day-trading methodology and The Rogue Code.
