= Carlo Gentile =

Italian-American photographer (1835–1893)

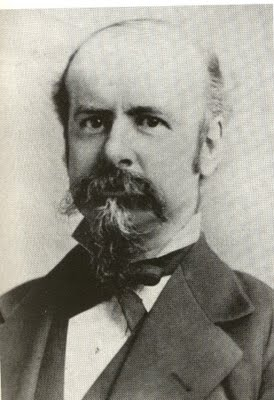
- Born: 1835; Naples, Italy
- Died: 15 October 1893 (age 57 or 58); Chicago, Illinois
- Known for: Photographer

Carlo Gentile (1835–1893), known professionally in his lifetime as Charles Gentile, was a 19th-century Italian-American photographer. After travelling the world, he settled in Victoria, British Columbia for a few years, photographing diverse subjects including the gold fields. In 1867, he moved to California, and lived a restless existence with frequent moves between California and Arizona. In 1871, he purchased a young boy named Wassaja, later named Carlos Montezuma, for 30 silver dollars. In the midst of their travels, they participated in a Wild West Show starring Buffalo Bill. Gentile continued the pursuit of his photographic career in Chicago, while publishing a series of newspapers along with maintaining a weekly magazine.

== Early life ==
Gentile was born in 1835 in Naples, Italy. Growing up in a cultured atmosphere, he received an art education from private tutors. After the death of his father around 1856, Gentile received an inheritance of 25,000 dollars. He voyaged to Australia, the Caribbean, and South America, before residing for a short period in San Francisco. (Note: The sparse and uncertain facts of Gentile's early life rely on Oren Arnold's Savage Son, a fictionalized biography of Carlos Montezuma. An examination of the papers of Will C. Barnes, which supplied the research for the novel, shows that much of the content was the product of the author's imagination.) In September 1862, "Gentile and lady" (Note: Little is known of his first wife whose name is unrecorded. She is only described as "Mrs. Gentile", and is not mentioned after her husband's time on Vancouver Island.) traveled north to Victoria, British Columbia, then part of the Colony of Vancouver Island. By February 1863, he had opened a fancy goods store in Victoria.

== British Columbia ==
A change in Gentile's career appeared in August 1863, when he advertised for "Photographic Fixings wanted". By October, he listed his services as a photographer." Gentile was the first British Columbia photographer to specialize in portraits of First Nations people. Besides taking local pictures of Victoria and its citizenry, he traveled to the interior of Vancouver Island to photograph the Alberni Valley, Nanaimo, Cowichan Bay, and the short-lived Leech River gold rush. Within two years after his arrival, Gentile was a successful businessman associated with the political and social elite of the two colonial capitals, Victoria and New Westminster. Despite this, in March 1865, he put his photographic gallery up for sale. It didn't sell immediately, and he stayed in business for approximately a year and a half longer. In the summer and fall of 1865 he travelled by wagon road and steamer to the gold fields of the Cariboo and the Thompson River, providing an important visual record of the mining settlements. Gentile wintered back home in Victoria, and in March 1866 toured parts of Washington Territory with Governor William Pickering In Seattle, he took the earliest known views of that city. He made plans to tour Europe with his pictures, and he hired a fellow photographer, Noah Shakespeare, to conduct business in his absence. However, a "square deal box" containing his images was lost during a shipment by sea, and his trip was cancelled.

== California and Arizona ==
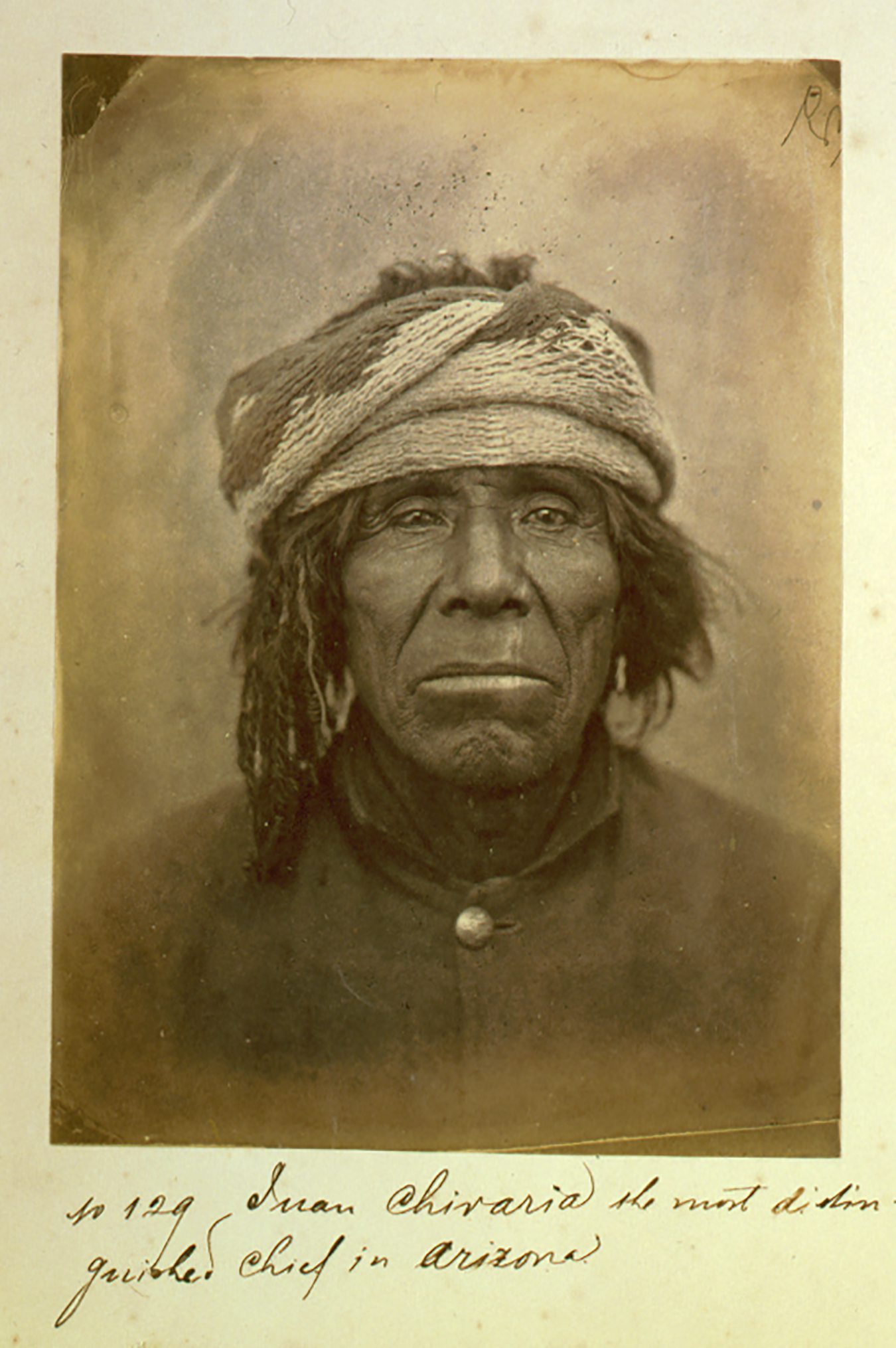
Juan Chivaria, the most distinguished chief in Arizona. Circa 1870.

Arriving in San Francisco in early 1867, Gentile spent an indeterminate time in the city before establishing himself at Gold Run. In California, he met the writer John Ross Browne, who told him that Native Americans could be found in their natural state in Arizona. In late 1867 or early 1868, he traveled across Southern California, possibly visiting Baja California, before setting up a temporary studio on the lower Colorado River by the Arizona border. The exact date of his arrival in Arizona is unclear, but he was in Tucson in early 1868, photographing the Pima and Maricopa Indians, as well as Catholic mission churches and prehistoric Indian ruins. Later, in the fall, he traveled north to Prescott, stopping to take photographs for a month. In January 1869, he sold his business in Arizona, to cross boundaries once again, this time spending several months in Santa Barbara, California. He eventually returned to Arizona in 1870 or 1871. Gentile briefly had studios in Tucson and Adamsville, now a ghost town. He befriended Arizona Governor Anson P.K. Safford, and accompanied him along with a large prospecting party to the Pinal Mountains, but the mining story that had spurred the expedition turned out to be false. At the Eighth Industrial Exhibition of the Mechanics' Institute, held at San Francisco in September 1871, Gentile exhibited a selection of his Arizona photographs and Indian clothing.

At Adamsville, two miles west of his residence in Florence, Gentile purchased from two Pima warriors a young Yavapai boy named Wassaja, paying 30 silver dollars for him. The boy's camp had been raided a few days earlier while his father and mother were absent, and Wassaja's parents soon became confined to the San Carlos Reservation. His sisters Cow-wow-se-puchia and Ho-lac-sa were also captured, and one of Gentile's first acts was to unwittingly take the boy to see them at a ranch on the Gila River. A photograph of the sad children bears witness to the encounter. On November 17, 1871, Wassaja was baptised as Carlos Montezuma in the First Church of the Assumption in Florence. In the same month, Gentile and Montezuma left with a party of explorers travelling by wagon towards the Grand Canyon, and for a time the boy stayed with the Hualapai. Montezuma was becoming habituated to his new life, and declined an offer of escape, not wishing to lose his three meals a day. On the return trip, Gentile and Montezuma traveled in a southeasterly direction from Camp Verde to Fort Apache.

In the early 1870s Gentile assembled a prototype album of his Arizona photographs, a copy of which is found at the Library of Congress. Portraits include members of the Pima, Coyotero Apache, Tonto Apache, and Mohave peoples. Some places shown are Maricopa Wells, Tumacacori, Mission San Xavier del Bac, Date creek, Camp Verde, and Casa Grande.

In March 1872, Gentile stayed briefly at Prescott. In that spring, Gentile and Montezuma traveled by wagon to Zuni territory, and thence to the Acoma and Laguna Pueblos of the Keres people. Afterwards, they passed through Albuquerque and Santa Fe, before catching a stagecoach to Trinidad and Pueblo, Colorado. Lantern slides of this trip, now located at the Smithsonian Institution, were used by Montezuma in talks during his adult years.

== Travels and Buffalo Bill ==
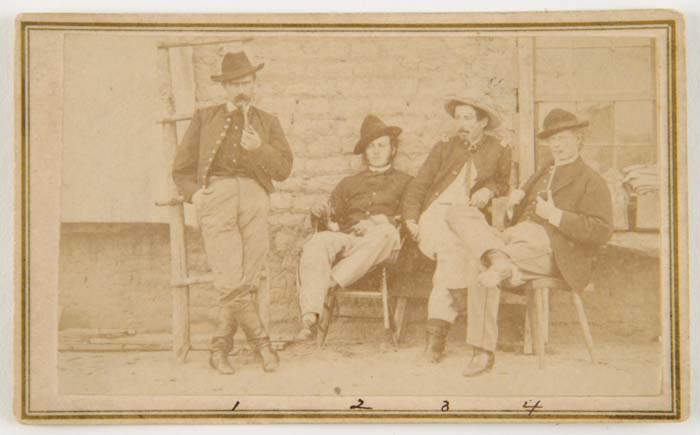
Four soldiers at rest. From left, F.G. Adams, Tom McDougle, Captain Fargus, James Calfhoun. 1870s.

In Pueblo, Gentile and Montezuma boarded the train for Denver. An itinerant period of wandering followed that is poorly documented. According to Montezuma's recollections, they traveled by train to Washington, D.C., then to New York City, and down to Florida before heading northward as far as Canada.

In Chicago, the pair joined the production of a show written by Ned Buntline, The Scouts of the Prairie, and Red Deviltry As It Is!. This Wild West entertainment, starred Buffalo Bill, Buntline, Giuseppina Morlacchi, and Texas Jack Omohundro. Despite being panned by critics, it was a great box office success. During their last performance in Chicago, Montezuma appeared on stage for the first time. He was later billed as "the young Apache captive, Azteka". Gentile had a promotional role, selling carte-de-visites of the cast members. After Chicago, the show toured St. Louis, Cincinnati, Louisville, Indianapolis, Toledo, Cleveland, and Pittsburgh. After the show played in Franklin, Pennsylvania, in March 1873, Gentile and Montezuma departed the tour.

It is unclear where they traveled next, with the exception of stops in Washington, D.C., New York City, and Grand Rapids. They settled in Chicago for a period until 1875, where Montezuma attended school while his adoptive father ran a new photographic studio. For a time, an art gallery founded by Lydia J. Cadwell was named the Gentile Gallery after his premises in the same building. In 1875, as a treatment for a persistent cough, Montezuma was placed on a country farm in Galesburg, Illinois, where he spent two years. Gentile meanwhile, had begun taking stereoviews of famous Chicago buildings and interiors. In September 1877, The Philadelphia Photographer published a composite photograph by Gentile based on the carbon process, depicting Lieutenant-General Philip Sheridan and his staff. He exhibited his works in New York in early 1877, winning the highest award.

The reunited Gentile and Montezuma took up residence in Brooklyn. Apparently Gentile had an art and photography store which was destroyed in a fire, (Note: This information is based on Arnold's novel and has not been verified.) In 1878, the pair traveled to Canada and then to Boston, returning to Chicago late that year. Realizing that Montezuma needed a sound education and a stable upbringing, he was entrusted to the care of a Baptist minister in Urbana, Illinois. Montezuma went on to have a distinguished career and personal life, becoming the second Native American to graduate with a medical degree, as well as being a tireless promoter of Indigenous rights.

== Chicago ==
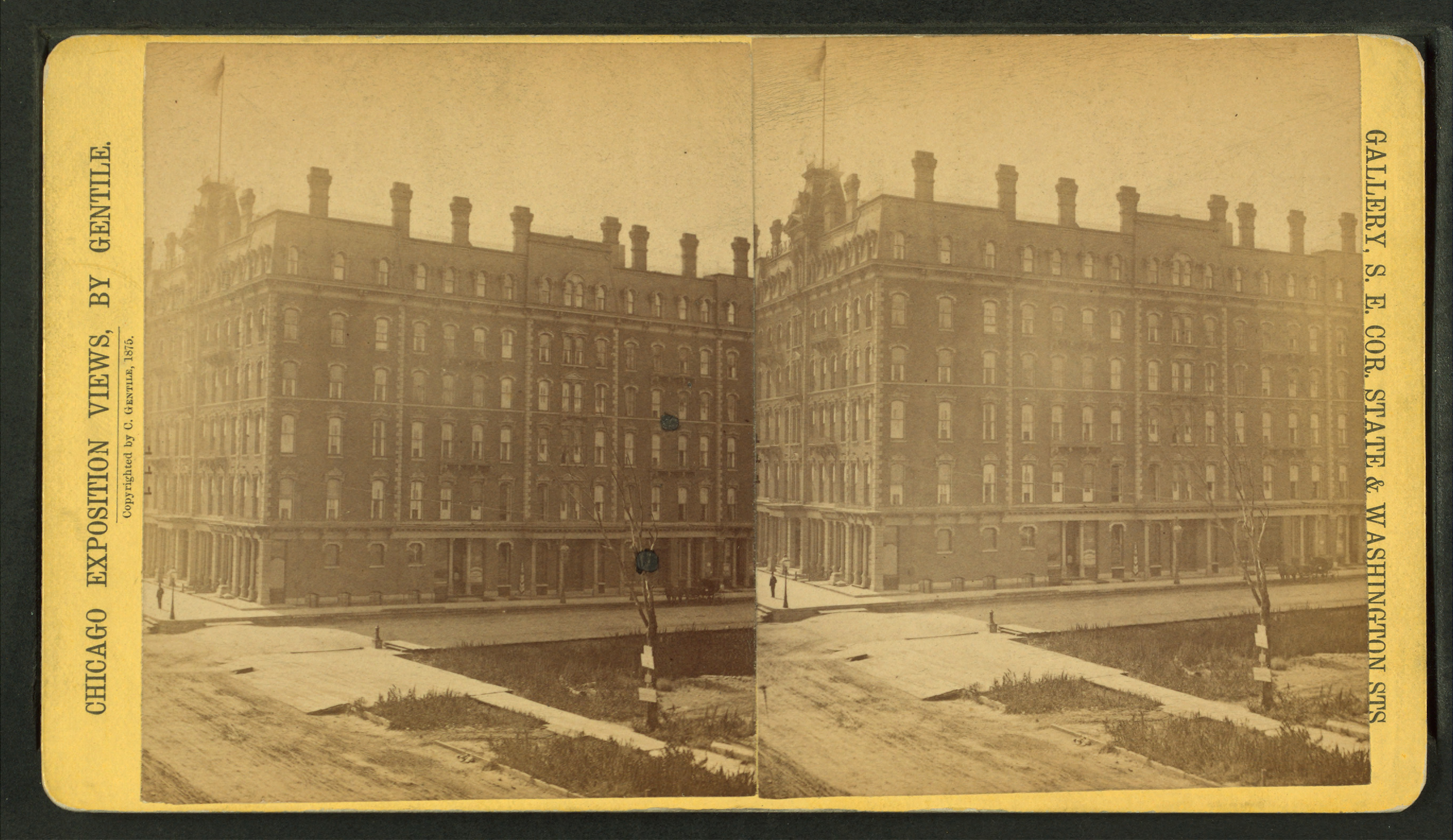
The Gardner House, Chicago. Undated stereoview by Gentile.

Starting in the late 1870s, Gentile served as the photographic editor of The Eye, a weekly semi-literary magazine published in Bloomington, Indiana. In November 1879 he was in the west for a period, selling rights to Willis' patent platinum process. He operated a succession of photographic studios in Chicago under his own name until 1883, and then with partner Zachary Taylor until 1885. He joined with other Chicago photographers in 1880 for the founding of the Photographers' Association of America, serving as vice-president. Around this time he was also listed as an instructor of practical photography at the Chicago College of Photography. In 1884, Gentile purchased The Eye magazine, and moved it to Chicago, renaming it to The Photographic Eye, and the Eye, and became its editor. Continually experimenting with new photographic methods, Gentile was becoming known nationally. He completed a report on the status of photography in 1884 for the prestigious Photographers' Association of America. In 1885, Gentile discontinued his Chicago studios for about a year, and traveled to demonstrate the carbon process. On his return to Chicago, he renamed his magazine The Eye, hoping to appeal to a more general readership.

A new venture for Gentile occurred in 1886, when he and 16-year-old Oscar Durante founded L'Italia, an Italian-American newspaper. Four months after its inception, Durante bought Gentile's share in the company. In 1877, Gentile had a strong hand in organizing the Great Convention of American and Canadian Photography held in Chicago. The following year, he started a new Italian-American newspaper, Il Messaggiere Italo-Americano, this time in partnership with Dr. Giuseppe Ronga. This was a sophisticated undertaking in the manner of a European journal, but it folded after two years. Gentile began a third paper, La Colonia, orientated to the local Italian community of Chicago, and it lasted from 1889 to 1892. In 1891, the St. Louis and Canadian Photographer reported on the death of Gentile's third wife. Compounding his loss were mounting financial difficulties and professional disappointments among his peers.

Gentile pressed for a separate building of photography at the upcoming 1893 World's Fair, but photography was only allowed its own space. During this time, he had neglected The Eye, and it fell under criticism. Tragedy once again struck his household, with the loss of a daughter to scarlet fever in May 1893. Gentile was now in financial straits, and suffering emotional and physical distress from the effects of Bright's disease, a kidney condition. Montezuma came to visit in the summer of 1893 and recommended that he seek treatment. Gentile traveled to Mineral Spring, Indiana, but it was too late. (Note: The source does not specify whether Mineral Spring is a health spa or a community, or where it is located in Indiana. It may perhaps refer to one of the places named "Mineral Springs" in Indiana.) He died on 27 October 1893, leaving behind a wife and a young son. He was buried in the lot of the Chicago Press Club at Mount Hope Cemetery in Chicago. Montezuma was unable to attend the funeral due to professional commitments, but he sent financial aid to the widow. In addition, he became custodian of Gentile's son, also named Carlos.

== Gallery ==
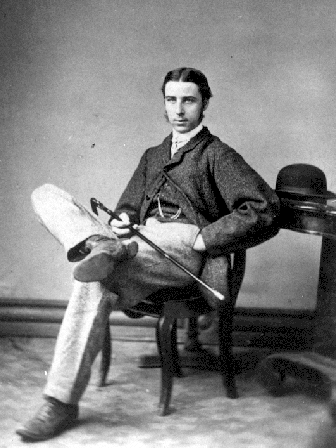
William Wentworth Fitzwilliam. Circa 1864.

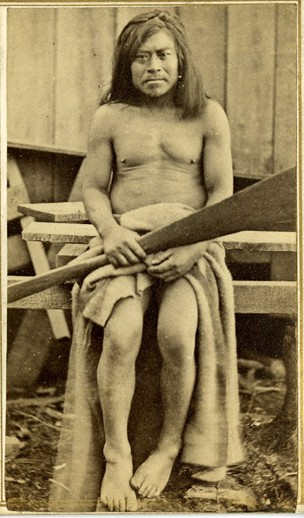
Tyhee, a Ucluelet man. 1863 to 1866.

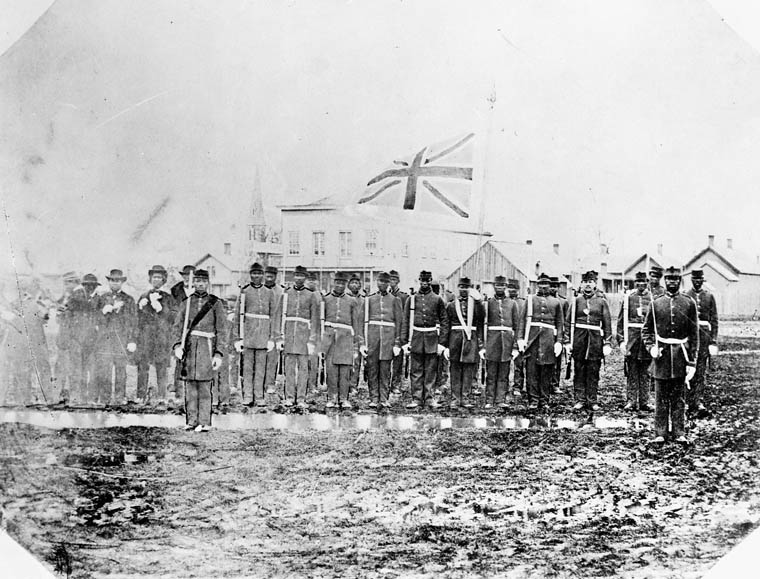
Volunteer Company in Victoria. 1863 to 1866.

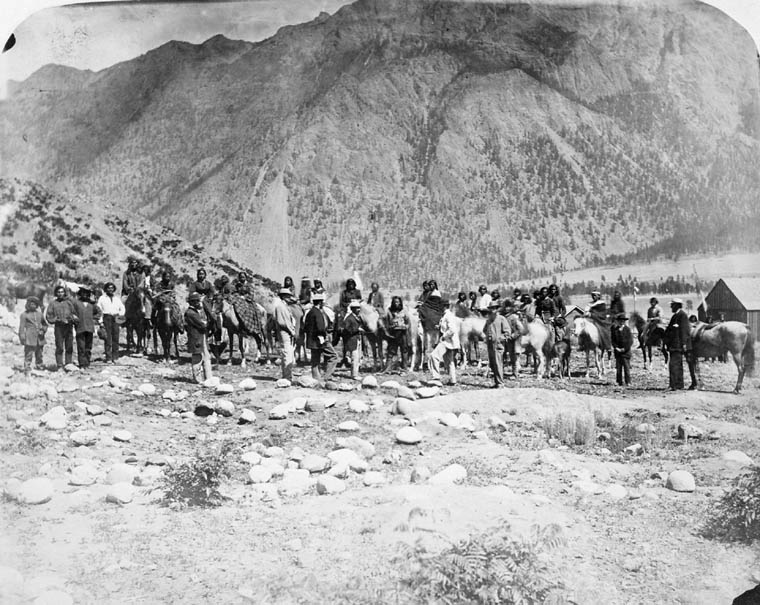
St'at'imc (Lillooet) First Nations people. 1865.

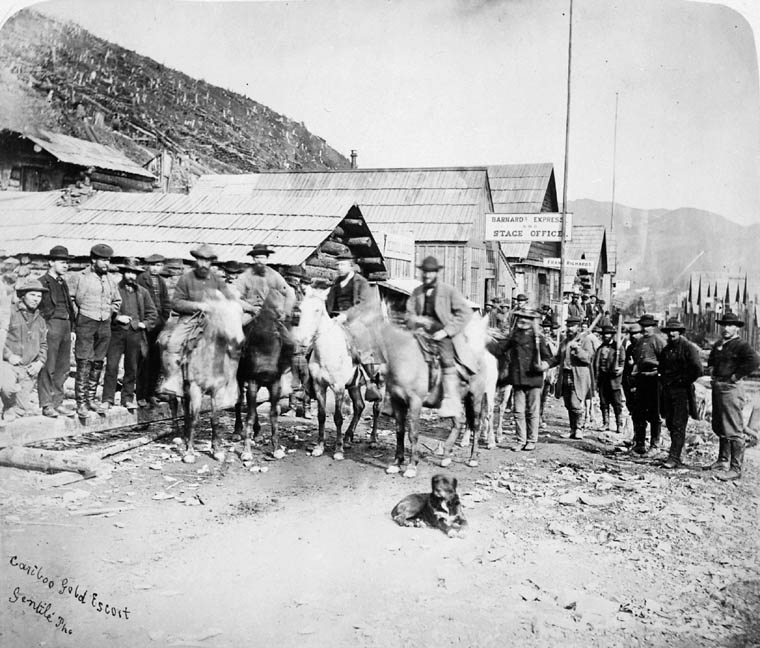
Barnard's Express and Stage Office, Barkerville. 1865.

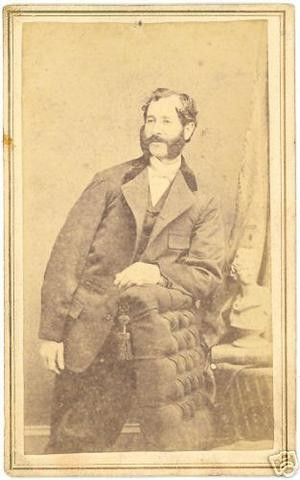
Portrait of unidentified man. San Francisco, 1867.

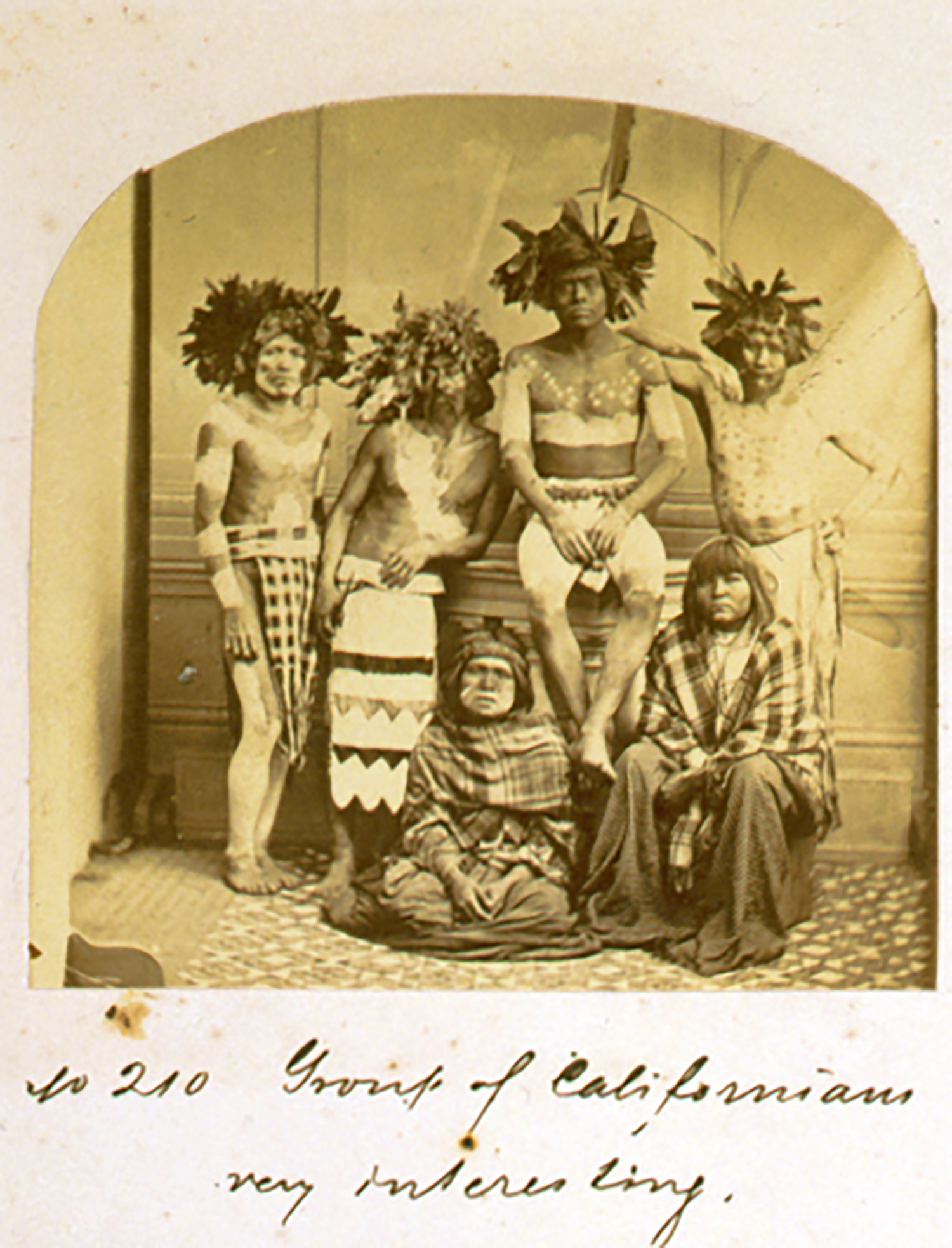
Group of Californians. Circa late 1860s.

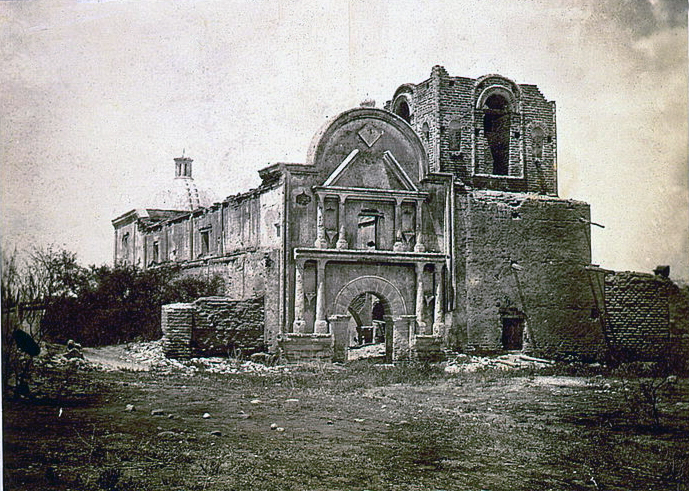
Mission San José de Tumacácori. Circa 1870.

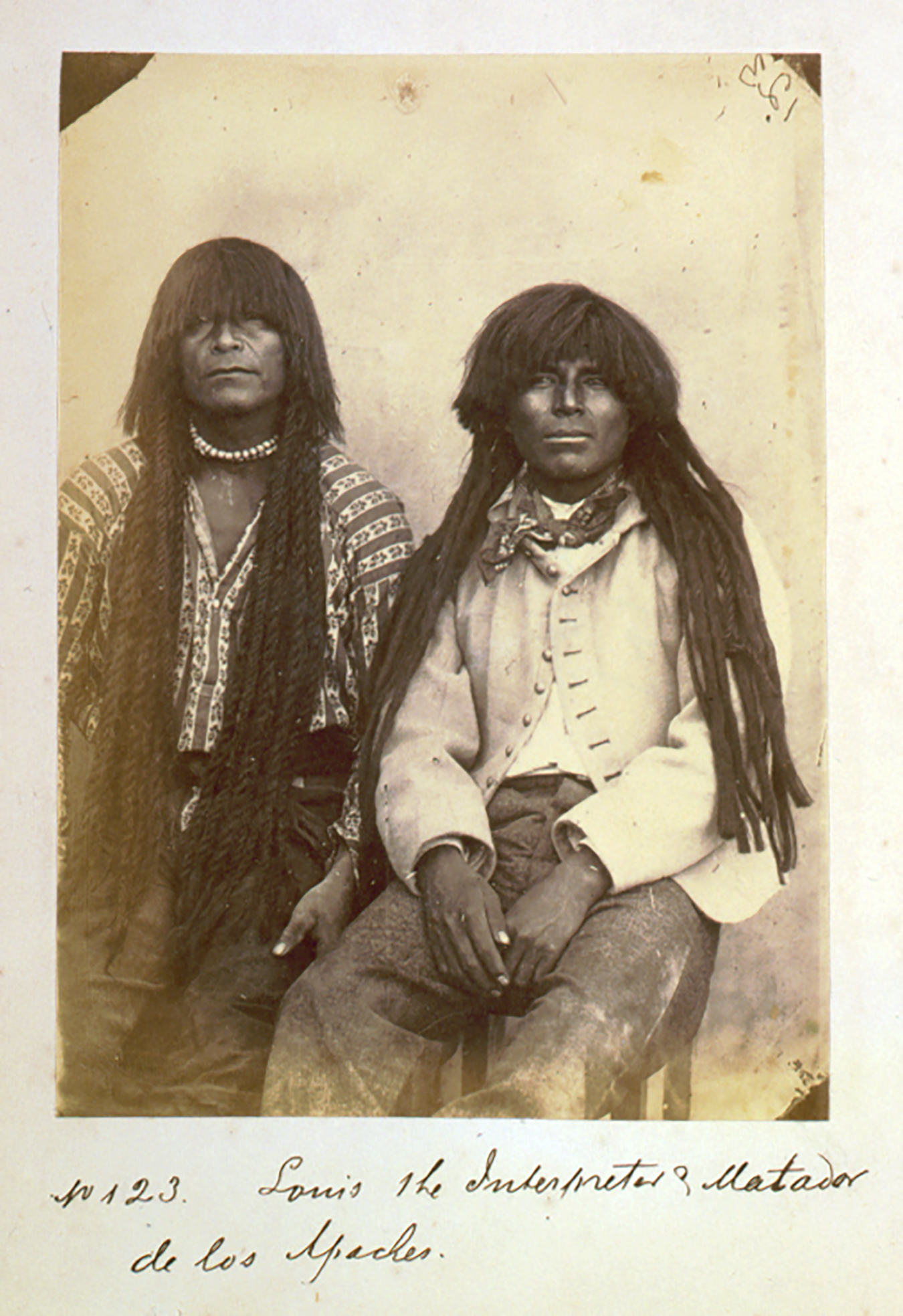
Louis the interpreter & Matador de los Apaches. Circa 1870.

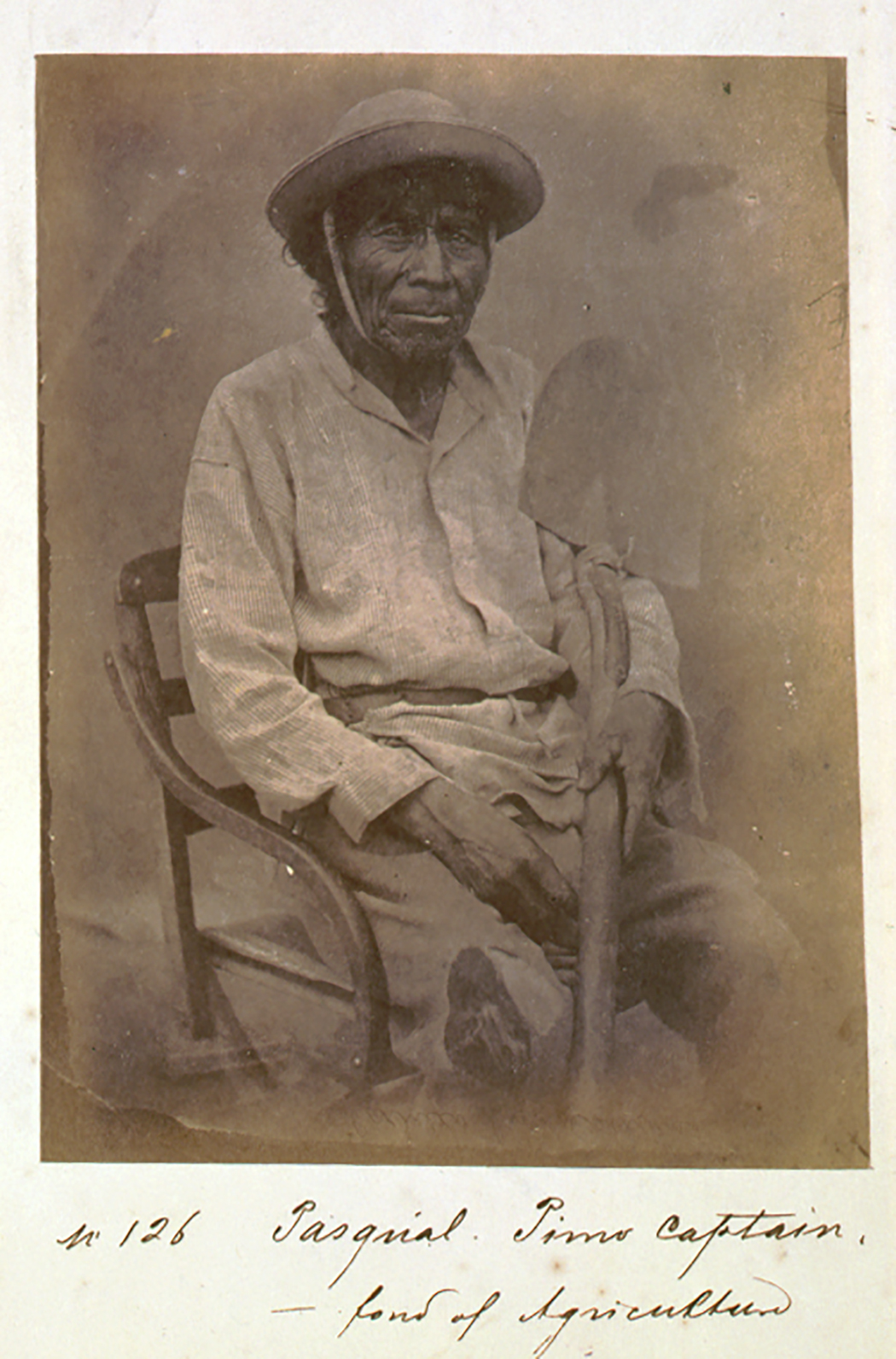
Pasquial, a Pima fond of agriculture. Circa 1870.

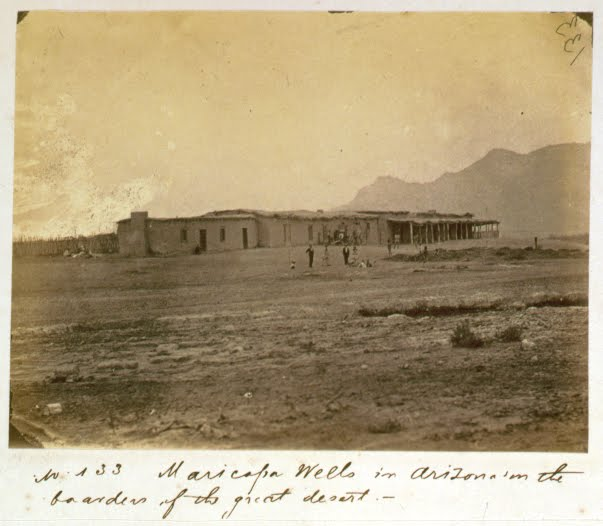
Maricopa Wells, Arizona. Early 1870s.

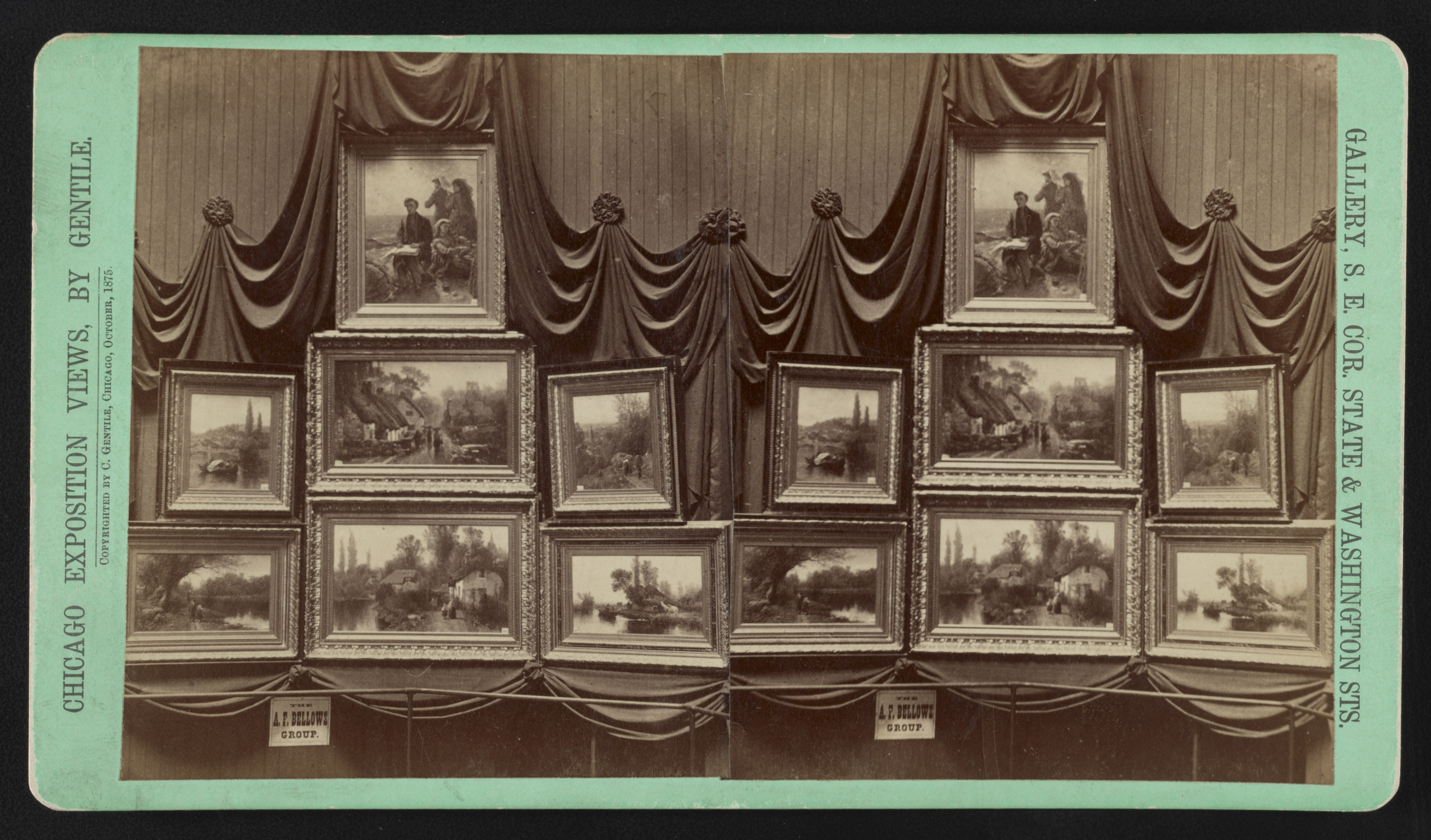
The Albert Fitch Bellows Group, Chicago. 1893.
