= Anatolidion =

Scientific classification
- Kingdom: Animalia
- Phylum: Arthropoda
- Subphylum: Chelicerata
- Class: Arachnida
- Order: Araneae
- Infraorder: Araneomorphae
- Family: Theridiidae
- Genus: Anatolidion; Wunderlich, 2008
- Species: A. gentile

Binomial name
- Anatolidion gentile (Simon, 1881)

Genus of spiders

Anatolidion is a monotypic genus of comb-footed spiders containing the single species, Anatolidion gentile. It was first described by J. Wunderlich in 2008, and is found in Africa and Europe.
