= Camilla Gentili =

Italian blessed

Blessed Camilla Gentili
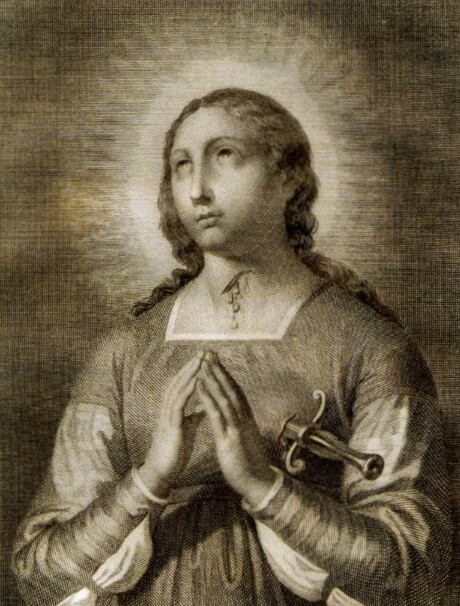

Laywoman
- Born: 14?? San Severino Marche, Macerata, Papal States
- Died: 26 July 1486; Uvaiolo, San Severino Marche, Papal States
- Venerated in: Roman Catholic Church
- Beatified: 15 January 1841, Saint Peter's Basilica, Papal States by Pope Gregory XVI
- Feast: 26 July
- Attributes: Palm; Dagger
- Patronage: Difficult marriages; Abuse victims

Camilla Gentili (14?? – 26 July 1486) was an Italian Roman Catholic from Macerata. She was married to the anti-religious and abusive Battista Santucci, who murdered her in cold blood in opposition to her faith and her perceived disobedience.

Gentili was beatified in 1841 after Pope Gregory XVI approved her 'cultus' (or popular following and longstanding devotion).

== Life ==
Camilla Gentili was born as a noble in Macerata to Luca Gentili of the Rovellone lords into the House of Grassi.

Gentili entered an arranged marriage to Battista Santucci. He hated her and her family for their piety and devotion to the Catholic faith. Her husband murdered Pierozzo Grassi in 1482, because of his Christian faith. Instead of allowing her husband to face punishment for murder, Gentili intervened on Santucci's behalf and saved his life. Despite her act of kindness, Sanctucci later turned against Gentili and murdered her, after discovering that she had secret meetings with her mother even though he had forbidden her to do so.

In mock tenderness he invited her to his farm in Uvaiolo, and murdered her by stabbing her in the throat and heart. She was buried in the Gentili plot at the Church of Santa Maria del Mercato – now titled as San Domenico.

Pope Benedict XIV fostered a special devotion to her prior to and during his time as pontiff.

== Beatification ==
The confirmation of Gentili's longstanding 'cultus' (or popular devotion) allowed Pope Gregory XVI to approve her beatification on 15 January 1841.
