= Gentile Tondino =

Canadian artist (1923-2001)

Gentile (Gerry) Tondino
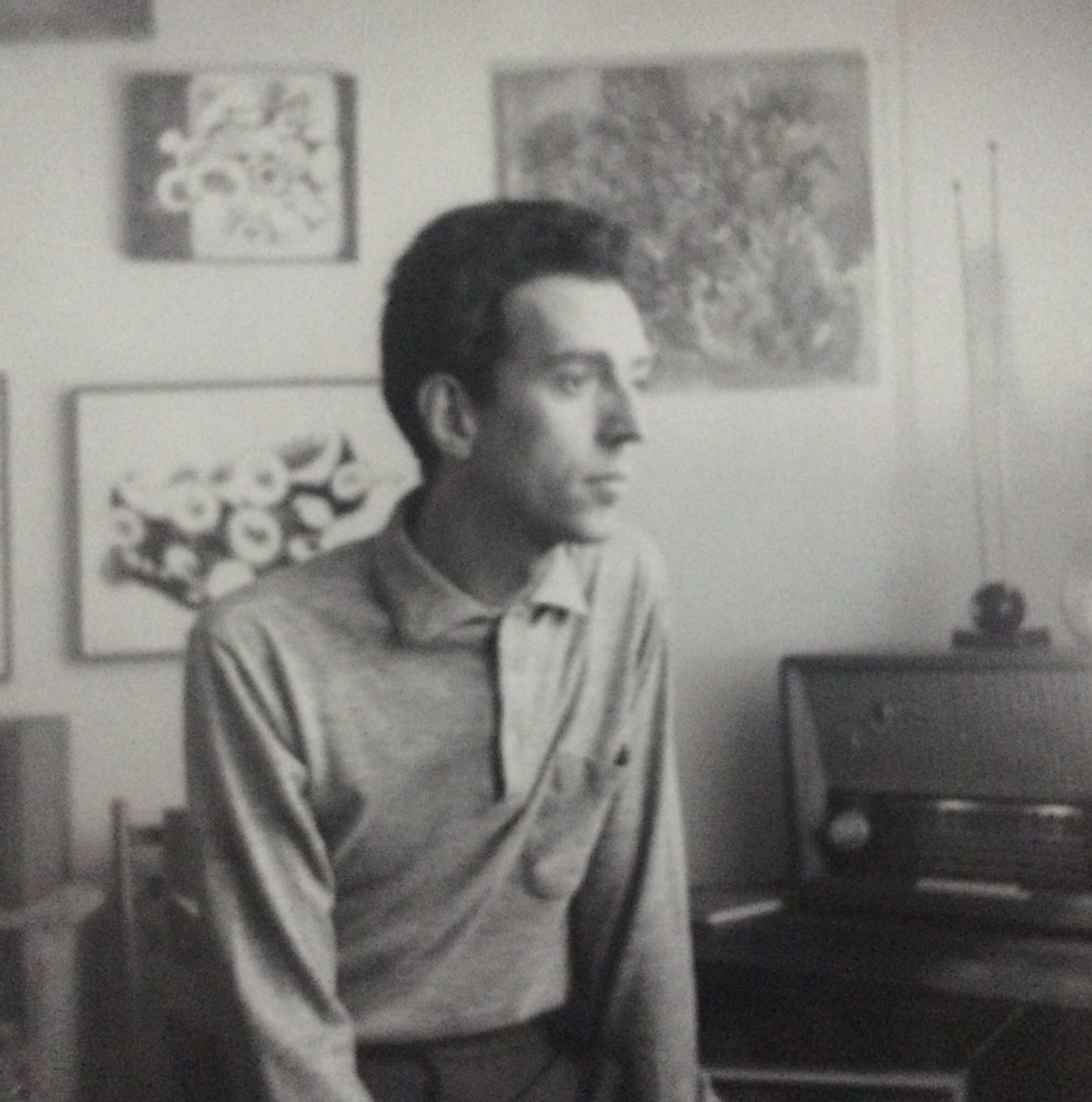
- Gentile Tondino photo circa 1955
- Born: September 3, 1923; Montreal, Quebec, Canada
- Died: August 29, 2001 (aged 77); Montreal, Quebec, Canada
- Known for: educator, artist

Gentile (Gerry) Tondino RCA (September 3, 1923 – August 29, 2001) was a Canadian educator and artist, who lived in Montreal, Quebec. He painted in oil figures, semi-abstracts and still-life.

== Life and work ==
Tondino apprenticed with the Canadian painter Adam Sherriff Scott between 1943 and 1947, and studied for three years at the Montreal Museum of Fine Arts School of Art and Design with Arthur Lismer.

His drawings and paintings have been exhibited widely, in galleries and museums across Canada and Australia, as well as in Belgium and Bermuda. His work is also included in numerous private collections, and in the collections of the Montreal Museum of Fine Arts and the National Gallery of Canada, corporations like Shell Canada, C.I.L., Reader's Digest, the Art Gallery of Ottawa, the Ontario Heritage Foundation, and McGill University, which has nine commissioned portraits. In 1955, he was elected to the Canadian Group of Painters; in 1962, he was elected an associate member of the Royal Canadian Academy of Arts, and in 1968, he was named a full Academician of that society.

== Teaching ==
He was called an inspirational teacher of art and design by students.

- 1959–1999 – McGill University
- 1952–1967 – Montreal Museum of Fine Arts School of Art and Design

== Awards ==
- University of McGill Faculty of Engineering Alumni Award for Outstanding Teaching (1997)

== See also ==
- Max Stern
