= Ernesta Di Capua =

Italian botanist (1875–1943)

Ernesta Di Capua (26 July 1875, Rome - 23 October 1943, Auschwitz) was an Italian botanist, taxonomist, and explorer. She was executed at the Auschwitz concentration camp for her Jewish heritage. The species Caralluma dicapuae was named in her honor.

The standard author abbreviation Di Capua is used to indicate this person as the author when citing a botanical name.
