= Gentile Valley =

Valley in Caribou and Franklin counties in Idaho, United States

- Location within Idaho Location within the United States
- Floor elevation: 4,902 feet (1,494 m)

Geography
- Location: Cassia and Franklin counties in Idaho, United States
- Coordinates: source:GNIS 42°24′37″N 111°44′09″W
- Interactive map of Gentile Valley

Gentile Valley is a valley in Caribou and Franklin counties in Idaho, United States.

== Description ==
Gentile Valley was named out of anti-Mormon prejudice. Non-Mormons were commonly called gentiles, and with the name the early settlers of Gentile Valley let it be known that Mormons were not welcome there.

The valley is bounded by the Bear River Range on the east, Mound Valley on the south, the Portneuf Range on the west, and the Gem Valley on the north.
